= List of Arjuna Award recipients (1980–1989) =

List of recipients of a sports honor in India

Arjuna Award
- Civilian award for outstanding individual achievements in National Sports
- Sponsored by: Government of India
- Established: 1961
- First award: 1961

Highlights
- Total awarded: 147

The Arjuna Award, officially known as Arjuna Awards for Outstanding Performance in Sports and Games is a sports honour of Republic of India. It is awarded annually by the Ministry of Youth Affairs and Sports. Before the introduction of the Rajiv Gandhi Khel Ratna in 1991–1992, the Arjuna Award was the highest sporting honour of India. As of 2020, the award comprises "a bronze statuette of Arjuna, certificate, ceremonial dress, and a cash prize of ₹15 lakh (US$16,000)". (Note: The cash prize was introduced in the year 1977–1978 as a scholarship of ₹200 (US$2.10) a month for 2 years. It was revised to one time cash prize of ₹5,000 (US$53) in 1986, to ₹20,000 (US$210) in 1987, to ₹50,000 (US$530) in 1993, to ₹1.5 lakh (US$1,600) in 1998, to ₹3 lakh (US$3,200) in 2001, to ₹5 lakh (US$5,300) in 2009, and to ₹15 lakh (US$16,000) in 2020.)

== Name ==
The award is named after Arjuna, a character from the Sanskrit epic Mahabharata of ancient India. He is one of the Pandavas, depicted as a skilled archer, winning the hand of Draupadi in marriage, and, in the Kurukshetra War, Lord Krishna becomes his charioteer, teaching him the sacred knowledge of Gita. In Hindu mythology, he has been seen as a symbol of hard work, dedication and concentration.

== History ==
Instituted in 1961 to honour the outstanding sportspersons of the country, the award over the years has undergone a number of expansions, reviews, and rationalizations. The award was expanded to include all the recognised disciplines in 1977, has introduced indigenous games and physically handicapped categories in 1995 and introduced a lifetime contribution category in 1995 leading to creation of a separate Dhyan Chand Award in 2002. The latest revision in 2018 stipulates that the award is given only to the disciplines included in the events like Olympic Games, Paralympic Games, Asian Games, Commonwealth Games, World Championship and World Cup along with Cricket, Indigenous Games, and Parasports. It also recommends giving only fifteen awards in a year, relaxing in case of excellent performance in major multi-sport events, team sports, across gender and giving away of at least one award to physically challenged category.

The nominations for the award are received from all government recognised National Sports Federations, the Indian Olympic Association, the Sports Authority of India (SAI), the Sports Promotion and Control Boards, the state and the union territory governments and the Rajiv Gandhi Khel Ratna, Arjuna, Dhyan Chand and Dronacharya awardees of the previous years. The recipients are selected by a committee constituted by the Ministry and are honoured for their "good performance in the field of sports over a period of four years" at international level and for having shown "qualities of leadership, sportsmanship and a sense of discipline".

== Recipients ==
A total of 147 awards were presented in the 1980s – thirteen in 1980–1981, followed by sixteen in 1981, twenty in 1982, nineteen in 1983, fifteen in 1984, nineteen in 1985, thirteen in 1986, fifteen in 1987, five in 1988 and twelve in 1989. Individuals from thirty-three different sports were awarded, which includes nineteen from athletics, ten each from hockey and cricket, seven each from boxing, mountaineering and weightlifting, six each from chess, wrestling and yachting, five each from kho kho, shooting, swimming, table tennis and volleyball, four each from billiards & snooker, equestrian, football and kabaddi, three each from golf, three each from adventure sports, badminton and basketball, two each from archery, golf, gymnastics, lawn tennis, polo, powerlifting and rowing, and one each from ball badminton, bodybuilding, cycling, roller skating and squash.

Amongst the notable winners were P. T. Usha (awarded in 1983), nicknamed "queen of track and field". In 1984 Los Angeles Olympics she missed the bronze medal by one-hundredth of a second in 400 metres hurdles, and in 1985 Asian Athletics Championships held in Indonesia, she won five gold medals and a bronze medal. Bachendri Pal (awarded in 1984), became the first Indian woman to climb Mount Everest in 1984, after which she led a number of expeditions including the 1993 Indo-Nepalese Women's Everest Expedition. Viswanathan Anand (awarded in 1985) became India's first-ever chess grandmaster in 1988. He would go on to become the FIDE World Chess Championship in 2000 and subsequently undisputed World Chess Champion four times in 2007, 2008, 2010, and 2012. Geet Sethi (awarded in 1985) was a professional English billiards player. He dominated the sport for much of 1990s, becoming the world champion eight times and setting two world records.

== List of Recipients ==
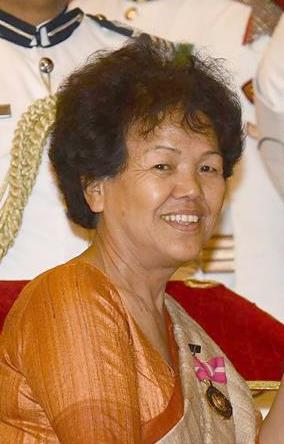
Bachendri Pal awarded in 1984

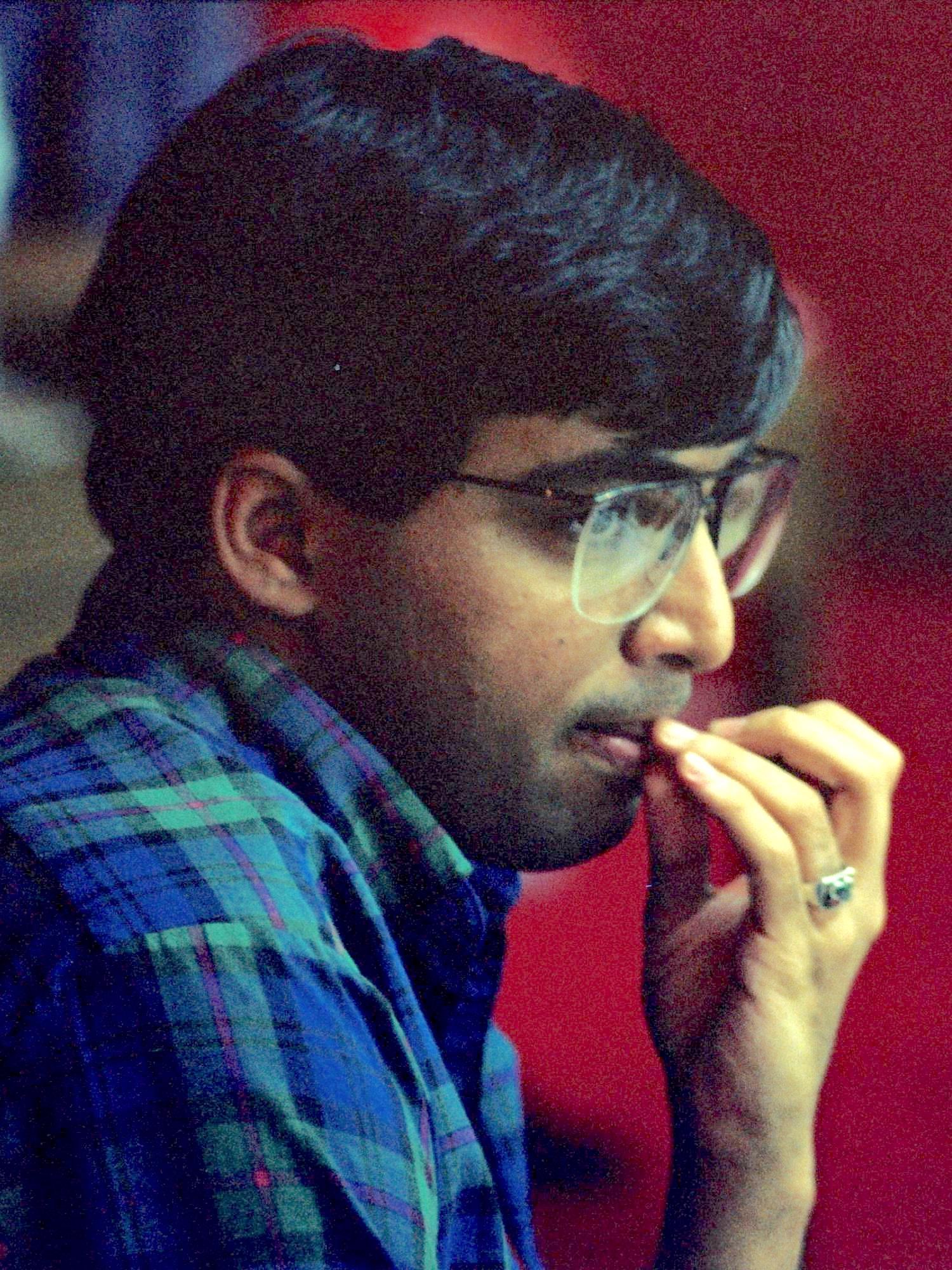
Viswanathan Anand awarded in 1985

Award recipients by year
Year	Number of recipients
1980–1981	13
1981	16
1982	20
1983	19
1984	15
1985	19
1986	13
1987	15
1988	5
1989	12

Award recipients by sport
Sport	Number of recipients
Adventure Sports	3
Archery	2
Athletics	19
Badminton	3
Basketball	3
Billiards & Snooker	4
Boxing	7
Chess	6
Cricket	10
Equestrian	4
Football	4
Golf	2
Gymnastics	2
Hockey	10
Kabaddi	4
Kho Kho	5
Lawn Tennis	2
Mountaineering	7
Polo	2
Powerlifting	2
Rowing	2
Shooting	5
Swimming	5
Table Tennis	5
Volleyball	5
Weightlifting	7
Wrestling	6
Yachting	6
Ball Badminton Bodybuilding Cycling Roller Skating Squash	1(each)

Key
§	Indicates Para sports

List of Arjuna award recipients, showing the year, sport, and gender
Year	Recipient	Sport	Gender
1980–1981	Issac Amaldas	Boxing	Male
1980–1981	Chetan Chauhan	Cricket	Male
1980–1981	Manjit Dua	Table Tennis	Male
1980–1981	Mohammed Habib	Football	Male
1980–1981	Shantaram Jadhav	Kabaddi	Male
1980–1981	Rohini Khadilkar	Chess	Female
1980–1981	Syed Kirmani	Cricket	Male
1980–1981	Ramesh Krishnan	Lawn Tennis	Male
1980–1981	Syed Modi	Badminton	Male
1980–1981	Eliza Nelson	Hockey	Female
1980–1981	Gopal Saini	Athletics	Male
1980–1981	Mohammed Shahid	Hockey	Male
1980–1981	Jagmander Singh	Wrestling	Male
1981	Chandraprabha Aitwal	Mountaineering	Female
1981	Sabir Ali	Athletics	Male
1981	Harshwanti Bisht	Mountaineering	Female
1981	S. P. Chauhan	Shooting	Male
1981	Krishna Das	Archery	Female
1981	Zarir Karanjia	Yachting	Male
1981	Sudhir Karmakar	Football	Male
1981	Ganapathy Manoharan	Boxing	Male
1981	Monika Nath	Kabaddi	Female
1981	Balwant Sandhu	Mountaineering	Male
1981	Sushma Sarolkar	Kho Kho	Female
1981	Bijaya Kumar Satpathy	Weightlifting	Male
1981	Rekha Sharma	Mountaineering	Female
1981	Varsha Soni	Hockey	Female
1981	H. M. Takalkar	Kho Kho	Male
1981	Dilip Vengsarkar	Cricket	Male
1982	Mohinder Amarnath	Cricket	Male
1982	Madhumita Bisht	Badminton	Female
1982	Charles Borromeo	Athletics	Male
1982	Rupinder Singh Brar	Equestrian	Male
1982	Venugopal Chandrasekhar	Table Tennis	Male
1982	Partho Ganguli	Badminton	Male
1982	Bhuvneshwari Kumari	Squash	Female
1982	Persis Madan	Swimming	Female
1982	Chand Ram	Athletics	Male
1982	Ajmer Singh	Basketball	Male
1982	Kartar Singh	Wrestling	Male
1982	Kaur Singh	Boxing	Male
1982	Lakshman Singh	Golf	Male
1982	Raghubir Singh	Equestrian	Male
1982	Tara Singh	Weightlifting	Male
1982	G. E. Sridharan	Volleyball	Male
1982	Farokh Tarapore	Yachting	Male
1982	Fali Unwalla	Yachting	Male
1982	Jeeje Unwalla	Yachting	Male
1982	M. D. Valsamma	Athletics	Female
1983	Subhash Agarwal	Billiards & Snooker	Male
1983	Armin R. Arthan	Cycling	Female
1983	Dibyendu Barua	Chess	Male
1983	Vispy K. Daroga	Weightlifting	Male
1983	Diana Edulji	Cricket	Female
1983	Zafar Iqbal	Hockey	Male
1983	Maya Kashinath	Kabaddi	Female
1983	Mohinder Lal	Shooting	Male
1983	Shanti Mullick	Football	Female
1983	Veena Narayan Parab	Kho Kho	Female
1983	Jaslal Pradhan	Boxing	Male
1983	R. K. Purohit	Volleyball	Female
1983	Suman Sharma	Basketball	Female
1983	Radhey Shyam	Basketball	Male
1983	R. S. Sodhi	Polo	Male
1983	Anita Sood	Swimming	Male
1983	Parvin K. Uberoy	Rowing	Male
1983	P. T. Usha	Athletics	Female
1983	Suresh Yadav	Athletics	Male
1984	Shiny Abraham	Athletics	Female
1984	Omprakesh Agrawal	Snooker	Male
1984	P. J. Joseph	Powerlifting	Male
1984	Saly Joseph	Volleyball	Female
1984	Rajbir Kaur	Hockey	Female
1984	Ghulam Mohammed Khan	Equestrian	Male
1984	D. K. Khullar	Mountaineering	Male
1984	Raj Kumar	Athletics	Male
1984	Mohd. Amin Naik	Rowing	Male
1984	Bachendri Pal	Mountaineering	Male
1984	S. Prakash	Kho Kho	Male
1984	D. Rajaraman	Ball Badminton	Male
1984	Ravi Shastri	Cricket	Male
1984	Khajan Singh	Swimming	Male
1984	Pravin Thipsay	Chess	Male
1985	Asha Agarwal	Athletics	Female
1985	Anand Amritraj	Lawn Tennis	Male
1985	Viswanathan Anand	Chess	Male
1985	Raghubir Singh Bal	Athletics	Male
1985	Mehar Chand Bhaskar	Weightlifting	Male
1985	Phu Dorjee	Mountaineering	Male
1985	Soma Dutta	Shooting	Female
1985	S. B. Kulkarni	Kho Kho	Female
1985	Shubhangi Kulkarni	Cricket	Female
1985	Somiya Maney	Hockey	Male
1985	Kamlesh Mehta	Table Tennis	Male
1985	A. J. Pandit	Shooting	Male
1985	Gulshan Rai	Adventure Sports	Male
1985	Geet Sethi	Billiards & Snooker	Male
1985	Sunita Sharma	Gymnastics	Female
1985	Taranath Narayan Shenoy	Swimming§	Male
1985	Mahabir Singh	Wrestling	Male
1985	Prem Maya Sonir	Hockey	Female
1985	Adille Sumariwala	Athletics	Male
1986	Sandhya Agarwal	Cricket	Female
1986	Mohammad Azharuddin	Cricket	Male
1986	Dhruv Bhandari	Yachting	Male
1986	Joaquim Carvalho	Hockey	Male
1986	Premchand Degra	Bodybuilding	Male
1986	Arti Pradhan	Adventure Sports	Male
1986	K. S. Rao	Adventure Sports	Male
1986	Suman Rawat	Athletics	Female
1986	Bhagirath Samai	Shooting	Male
1986	Jagmohan Sapra	Weightlifting	Male
1986	Rama Sarkar	Kabaddi	Female
1986	Jaipal Singh	Boxing	Male
1986	Cyril C. Valloor	Volleyball	Male
1987	J. S. Ahluwalia	Equestrian	Male
1987	G. Devan	Weightlifting	Male
1987	Kuldeep Singh Garcha	Polo	Male
1987	Seera Jayaram	Boxing	Male
1987	Nonita Lal	Golf	Female
1987	Monalisa Baruah Mehta	Table Tennis	Female
1987	Naman Virendra Parekh	Roller Skating	Male
1987	C. S. Pradipak	Yachting	Male
1987	Devaki Prasad	Chess	Male
1987	Vandana Rao	Athletics	Female
1987	Vandana Shanbagh	Athletics	Female
1987	Bagicha Singh	Athletics	Male
1987	Balwinder Singh	Athletics	Male
1987	Bhagyashree Thipsay	Chess	Female
1987	Subhash Verma	Wrestling	Male
1988	Wilson Cherian	Swimming	Male
1988	Rajesh Kumar	Wrestling	Male
1988	Ashwini Nachappa	Athletics	Female
1988	M. P. Singh	Hockey	Male
1988	P. K. Yeshodhra	Powerlifting	Male
1989	Abdul Basith	Volleyball	Male
1989	Subrata Bhattacharya	Football	Male
1989	Gopal Dewang	Boxing	Male
1989	Jyotsna Dutta	Weightlifting	Female
1989	Mercy Kuttan	Athletics	Female
1989	Madan Lal	Cricket	Male
1989	Shyam Lal Meena	Archery	Male
1989	Yasin Merchant	Billiards & Snooker	Male
1989	Krupali Patel	Gymnastics	Female
1989	Niyati Shah	Table Tennis	Female
1989	Pargat Singh	Hockey	Male
1989	Satyawan	Wrestling	Male
