= Athletics at the 1986 Asian Games =

- Venue: Olympic Stadium
- Dates: 29 September – 5 October 1986

The athletics competition at the 1986 Asian Games was held in Olympic Stadium, Seoul, South Korea.

== Medalists ==
=== Men ===
Event	Gold		Silver		Bronze	
100 m	Talal Mansour; Qatar	10.30; GR	Hiroki Fuwa; Japan	10.44	Zheng Chen; China	10.47
200 m	Jang Jae-keun; South Korea	20.71 =GR	Li Feng; China	20.97	Masahiro Nagura; Japan	21.10
400 m	Susumu Takano; Japan	45.00; GR	Isidro del Prado; Philippines	45.96	Mohammed Al-Malki; Oman	46.42
800 m	Kim Bok-joo; South Korea	1:49.15	Ryu Tae-kyung; South Korea	1:49.89	Najem Al-Sowailem; Kuwait	1:50.31
1500 m	Shuji Oshida; Japan	3:43.88	Ryu Tae-kyung; South Korea	3:44.51	Mohamed Suleiman; Qatar	3:44.68
5000 m	Kim Jong-yoon; South Korea	13:50.63; GR	Masanari Shintaku; Japan	13:52.65	Yutaka Kanai; Japan	13:53.73
10,000 m	Masanari Shintaku; Japan	28:26.74; GR	Kim Jong-yoon; South Korea	28:30.54	Toshihiko Seko; Japan	29:31.90
110 m hurdles	Yu Zhicheng; China	14.07; GR	Lu Quanbin; China	14.34	Kim Jin-tae; South Korea	14.37
400 m hurdles	Ahmed Hamada; Bahrain	49.31; GR	Ryoichi Yoshida; Japan	49.40	Jasem Al-Dowaila; Kuwait	50.22
3000 m steeplechase	Shigeyuki Aikyo; Japan	8:36.98; GR	Cheng Shouguo; China	8:37.33	Hajime Nagasato; Japan	8:42.30
4 × 100 m relay	China; Cai Jianming; Li Feng; Yu Zhuanghui; Zheng Chen	39.17; GR	Japan; Hideyuki Arikawa; Hirofumi Miyazaki; Hirofumi Koike; Hiroki Fuwa	39.31	South Korea; Sung Nak-kun; Jang Jae-keun; Kim Jong-il; Shim Duk-sup	39.66
4 × 400 m relay	Japan; Koichi Konakatomi; Kenji Yamauchi; Hiromi Kawasumi; Susumu Takano	3:02.33; GR	Iraq; Aouf Abdul-Rahman; Ziad Ali; Abbas Ali; Fahim Abdul-Sada	3:07.28	Philippines; Romeo Gido; Honesto Larce; Leopoldo Arnillo; Isidro del Prado	3:09.26
Marathon	Takeyuki Nakayama; Japan	2:08:21; GR	Hiromi Taniguchi; Japan	2:10:08	Yoo Jae-sung; South Korea	2:16:55
20 km walk	Sun Xiaoguang; China	1:25:46; GR	Jiang Shaohong; China	1:26:57	Siri Chand Ram; India	1:28:03
High jump	Zhu Jianhua; China	2.31	Liu Yunpeng; China	2.27	Shuji Ujino; Japan	2.21
Pole vault	Ji Zebiao; China	5.40; GR	Liang Xueren; China	5.30	Lee Jae-bok; South Korea	5.00
Long jump	Kim Jong-il; South Korea	7.94	Junichi Usui; Japan	7.92	Chen Zunrong; China	7.80
Triple jump	Norifumi Yamashita; Japan	17.01; GR	Park Young-jun; South Korea	15.97	Zou Zhenxian; China	15.76
Shot put	Ma Yongfeng; China	18.30	Gong Yitian; China	17.82	Yoshihisa Urita; Japan	17.51
Discus throw	Li Weinan; China	58.28	Yuko Maeda; Japan	54.14	Manjit Singh; India	52.80
Hammer throw	Shigenobu Murofushi; Japan	69.20	Luo Jun; China	66.34	Lü Dongping; China	66.28
Javelin throw	Kazuhiro Mizoguchi; Japan	76.60; GR	Kim Jae-sang; South Korea	74.44	Park Jong-sam; South Korea	74.12
Decathlon	Chen Zebin; China	7255	Takeshi Kojo; Japan	7171	Park Young-jun; South Korea	7163

=== Women ===
Event	Gold		Silver		Bronze	
100 m	Lydia de Vega; Philippines	11.53; GR	P. T. Usha; India	11.67	Ratjai Sripet; Thailand	11.75
200 m	P. T. Usha; India	23.44; GR	Lydia de Vega; Philippines	23.47	Park Mi-sun; South Korea	23.80
400 m	P. T. Usha; India	52.16; GR	Shiny Abraham; India	53.32	Hiromi Isozaki; Japan	53.76
800 m	Lim Chun-ae; South Korea	2:05.72	Yang Liuxia; China	2:06.04	Josephine Mary Singarayar; Malaysia	2:07.44
1500 m	Lim Chun-ae; South Korea	4:21.38	Yang Liuxia; China	4:22.07	Kim Wei-ja; South Korea	4:23.47
3000 m	Lim Chun-ae; South Korea	9:11.92; GR	Zhang Xiuyun; China	9:12.64	Suman Rawat; India	9:14.70
10,000 m	Wang Xiuting; China	32:47.77; GR	Kumi Araki; Japan	33:20.75	Xiao Hongyan; China	33:47.22
100 m hurdles	Chen Kemei; China	13.78	Chizuko Akimoto; Japan	13.88	Naomi Jojima; Japan	14.07
400 m hurdles	P. T. Usha; India	56.08; GR	Zhao Qianqian; China	59.37	Chen Juying; China	59.37
4 × 100 m relay	China; Pan Weixin; Shao Liwei; Luo Xin; Tian Yumei	44.78; GR	Thailand; Jaree Patarach; Reawadee Srithoa; Ratjai Sripet; Walapa Tangjitnusorn	45.14	South Korea; Yoon Mi-kyong; An Sin-young; Park Mi-sun; Lee Young-sook	45.59
4 × 400 m relay	India; M. D. Valsamma; Vandana Rao; Shiny Abraham; P. T. Usha	3:34.58; GR	Japan; Keiko Honda; Hitomi Koshimoto; Ayako Arai; Hiromi Isozaki	3:39.77	China; Zhao Qianqian; Lin Zhenglan; Chen Juying; Huang Jing	3:41.59
Marathon	Eriko Asai; Japan	2:41:03; GR	Misako Miyahara; Japan	2:41:36	Wen Yanmin; China	2:42:21
10 km walk	Guan Ping; China	48:40; GR	Xu Yongjiu; China	49:50	Hideko Hirayama; Japan	51:12
High jump	Megumi Sato; Japan	1.89 =GR	Zheng Dazhen; China	1.89 =GR	Kim Hee-sun; South Korea	1.89 =GR
Long jump	Liao Wenfen; China	6.37	Huang Donghuo; China	6.19	Minako Isogai; Japan	6.14
Shot put	Huang Zhihong; China	17.51	Cong Yuzhen; China	17.44	Aya Suzuki; Japan	15.06
Discus throw	Hou Xuemei; China	59.28; GR	Li Xiaohui; China	58.94	Lee Sang-yuk; South Korea	50.26
Javelin throw	Li Baolian; China	59.42	Emi Matsui; Japan	55.00	Jang Sun-hee; South Korea	52.78
Heptathlon	Zhu Yuqing; China	5580; GR	Ye Lianying; China	5413	Ji Jeong-mi; South Korea	5067

== Medal table ==
Rank	Nation	Gold	Silver	Bronze	Total
1	China (CHN)	17	18	8	43
2	Japan (JPN)	11	13	11	35
3	South Korea (KOR)	7	5	13	25
4	India (IND)	4	2	3	9
5	Philippines (PHI)	1	2	1	4
6	Qatar (QAT)	1	0	1	2
7	Bahrain (BRN)	1	0	0	1
8	Thailand (THA)	0	1	1	2
9	Iraq (IRQ)	0	1	0	1
10	Kuwait (KUW)	0	0	2	2
11	Malaysia (MAL)	0	0	1	1
11	Oman (OMA)	0	0	1	1
Totals (12 entries)		42	42	42	126
