= List of Kerala Olympians =

This is a list of Keralites who have represented India in the Olympic Games.

== List of Kerala Olympians ==
Athlete	Sport	Games	Notes
Thomas Varghese (Thiruvalla Pappan)	Football	1948 London	
P. B. Abdul Saleh (Kottayam Saleh)	Football	1952 Helsinki	
Ivan Jacob	400m	1952 Helsinki	
S. S. Narayan	Football	1956 Melbourne	
T. Abdul Rahman	Football	1956 Melbourne	
S. S. Narayan	Football	1960 Rome	
O. Chandrashekar	Football	1960 Rome	
M. Devadas	Football	1960 Rome	
Suresh Babu	Long Jump	1972 Munich	
Manuel Frederick	Field hockey	1972 Munich	Won bronze medal. 1st Keralite to win an Olympic medal
T. C. Yohannan	Long Jump	1976 Montreal	
P. T. Usha	100m, 200m	1980 Moscow	
P. T. Usha	400m Hurdles	1984 Los Angeles	
Shiny Wilson	800m	1984 Los Angeles	
M. D. Valsamma	4 × 400 m	1984 Los Angeles	
Shiny Wilson	800m	1988 Seoul	
P. T. Usha	400m Hurdles	1988 Seoul	
Mercy Mathew Kuttan	400m	1988 Seoul	
Shiny Wilson	800m	1992 Barcelona	
U. Vimal Kumar	Badminton	1992 Barcelona	
Shiny Wilson	800m	1996 Atlanta	
P. T. Usha	4 × 400 m (Reserve)	1996 Atlanta	
Sebastian Xavier	Swimming	1996 Atlanta	
A.Radhika Suresh	Table Tennis	1996 Atlanta	
Rosa Kutty	4 × 400 m	1996 Atlanta	
K. M. Beenamol	4 × 400 m	1996 Atlanta	
Ambika Radhika Suresh	Table Tennis	1996 Atlanta	
Sabu Varkey	Field hockey	1996 Atlanta	
Jincy Phillip	4 x 400 m	2000 Sydney	
Rosa Kutty	4 × 400 m	2000 Sydney	
K. M. Beenamol	400m	2000 Sydney	
Manjima Kuriakose	4 × 400 m	2000 Sydney	
Anil Kumar Prakash	100 m	2000 Sydney	
Lijo David Thottan	4 × 400 m	2000 Sydney	
K. J. Manoj Lal	400 m	2000 Sydney	
Dinesh Nayak	Field hockey	2000 Sydney	
Purukottam Ramachandran	4 × 400 m	2000 Sydney	
K. M. Beenamol	4 × 400 m	2004 Athens	
Bobby Aloysius	High Jump	2004 Athens	
K. M. Binu	400m	2004 Athens	
Anju Bobby George	Long Jump	2004 Athens	
Chitra K. Soman	4 × 400 m	2004 Athens	
Paulose Pandari Kunnel	Rowing	2004 Athens	
Anju Bobby George	Long Jump	2008 Beijing	
Chitra K. Soman	4 × 400 m	2008 Beijing	
Preeja Sreedharan	10000m	2008 Beijing	
Sini Jose	4 × 400 m	2008 Beijing	
Renjith Maheswary	Triple Jump	2008 Beijing	
Renjith Maheswary	Triple Jump	2012 London	
Tintu Luka	800 m	2012 London	
Mayookha Johny	Triple jump	2012 London	
Valiyaveetil Diju	Badminton	2012 London	
Irfan Kolothum Thodi	20 km walk	2012 London	
P. R. Sreejesh	Field hockey	2012 London	
Muhammed Anas	400 m and 4 x 400 m	2016 Rio de Janeiro	
Jinson Johnson	800 m	2016 Rio de Janeiro	
Thonakal Gopi	Marathon	2016 Rio de Janeiro	
Jisna Mathew	4 × 400 m	2016 Rio de Janeiro	
Tintu Luka	4 × 400 m	2016 Rio de Janeiro	
O. P. Jaisha	Marathon	2016 Rio de Janeiro	
Renjith Maheshwary	Triple Jump	2016 Rio de Janeiro	
P. R. Sreejesh	Field hockey	2016 Rio de Janeiro	
Sajan Prakash	Swimming (200 m butterfly)	2016 Rio de Janeiro	
Kunhu Muhammed	4 × 400 m	2016 Rio de Janeiro	
Anilda Thomas	4 × 400 m	2016 Rio de Janeiro	
Amoj Jacob	4 × 400 m relay	2020 Tokyo	
Muhammed Anas Yahiya	4 × 400 m relay	2020 Tokyo	
Noah Nirmal Tom	4 × 400 m relay	2020 Tokyo	
Alex Antony	4 × 400 m relay (Mixed)	2020 Tokyo	
Irfan Kolothum Thodi	20 km walk	2020 Tokyo	
Jabir M Palliyalil	400 m hurdles	2020 Tokyo	
Murali Sreeshankar	Men's long jump	2020 Tokyo	
P. R. Sreejesh	Field hockey	2020 Tokyo 2024 Paris	Won bronze medals at both the 2020 and 2024 Summer Olympics. 2nd Keralite to win an Olympic medal
Sajan Prakash	Men's 100 m butterfly Men's 200 m butterfly	2020 Tokyo	
