= Athletics at the 1988 Summer Olympics – Women's discus throw =

Women's discus throw at the Games of the XXIV Olympiad
- Pictogram for athletics
- Venue: Olympic Stadium
- Date: 28 September 1988 (qualifications); 29 September 1988 (finals)
- Competitors: 22 from 13 nations
- Winning distance: 72.30 OR

Medalists
1st place, gold medalist(s)		Martina Hellmann; East Germany
2nd place, silver medalist(s)		Diana Gansky; East Germany
3rd place, bronze medalist(s)		Tsvetanka Khristova; Bulgaria

The Women's Discus Throw event at the 1988 Summer Olympics in Seoul, South Korea had an entry list of 22 competitors, with two qualifying groups before the final (12) took place on Thursday September 29, 1988.

== Medalists ==
Gold	Martina Hellmann; East Germany
Silver	Diana Gansky; East Germany
Bronze	Tsvetanka Khristova; Bulgaria

== Records ==
These were the standing World and Olympic records (in metres) prior to the 1988 Summer Olympics.

World record	76.80	(East Germany) Gabriele Reinsch	Neubrandenburg (GDR)	July 9, 1988
Olympic record	69.96	(East Germany) Evelin Jahl	Moscow (URS)	August 1, 1980

The following Olympic record was set during this competition.

Date	Event	Athlete	Distance	OR	WR
September 29, 1988	Final	Martina Hellmann (GDR)	72.30m	OR	

== Qualifying round ==
- Held on Wednesday September 28, 1988

RANK	GROUP A	DISTANCE
1.	Zdeňka Šilhavá (TCH)	66.52 m
2.	Diana Gansky (GDR)	65.40 m
3.	Svetla Mitkova (BUL)	64.68 m
4.	Larisa Mikhalchenko (URS)	64.32 m
5.	Yu Hourun (CHN)	62.86 m
6.	Galina Murasova (URS)	62.54 m
7.	Ramona Pagel (USA)	57.50 m
8.	Connie Price (USA)	57.04 m
9.	Jacqueline McKernan (GBR)	50.92 m
10.	Kim Chun-hui (KOR)	45.88 m
—	Jeanne Ngo Minyemeck (CMR)	NM

RANK	GROUP B	DISTANCE
1.	Martina Hellmann (GDR)	67.12 m
2.	Gabriele Reinsch (GDR)	66.88 m
3.	Tsvetanka Khristova (BUL)	65.92 m
4.	Ellina Zvereva (URS)	63.26 m
5.	Carol Cady (USA)	62.72 m
6.	Hou Xuemei (CHN)	62.64 m
7.	Renata Katewicz (POL)	60.34 m
8.	Xing Ailan (CHN)	59.26 m
9.	María Isabel Urrutia (COL)	53.82 m
10.	Grace Apiafi (NGR)	49.84 m
11.	Siulolo Vao Ikavuka (TGA)	44.94 m

== Final ==
RANK	ATHLETE	DISTANCE	1	2	3	4	5	6
	Martina Hellmann (GDR)	72.30 m	71.84	64.80	68.70	72.30	69.66	67.50
	Diana Gansky (GDR)	71.88 m	65.58	66.14	X	65.82	71.88	68.08
	Tsvetanka Khristova (BUL)	69.74 m	66.48	66.44	64.06	66.84	69.74	69.00
4.	Svetla Mitkova (BUL)	69.14 m	63.62	65.74	65.56	67.24	X	69.14
5.	Ellina Zvereva (URS)	68.94 m	X	65.74	66.86	X	X	68.94
6.	Zdeňka Šilhavá (TCH)	67.84 m	67.40	X	65.70	66.30	67.84	66.50
7.	Gabriele Reinsch (GDR)	67.26 m	67.26	66.50	63.30	65.88	66.40	X
8.	Hou Xuemei (CHN)	65.94 m	63.44	63.88	65.18	65.94	65.50	65.06
9.	Yu Hourun (CHN)	64.08 m	62.94	X	64.08			
10.	Larisa Mikhalchenko (URS)	64.08 m	64.08	X	45.88			
11.	Carol Cady (USA)	63.42 m	60.82	61.06	63.42			
12.	Galina Murasova (URS)	NM	X	X	X			

== See also ==
- 1986 Women's European Championships Discus Throw (Stuttgart)
- 1987 Women's World Championships Discus Throw (Rome)
- 1990 Women's European Championships Discus Throw (Split)
- 1991 Women's World Championships Discus Throw (Tokyo)
