= Talal Mansour =

Qatari sprinter

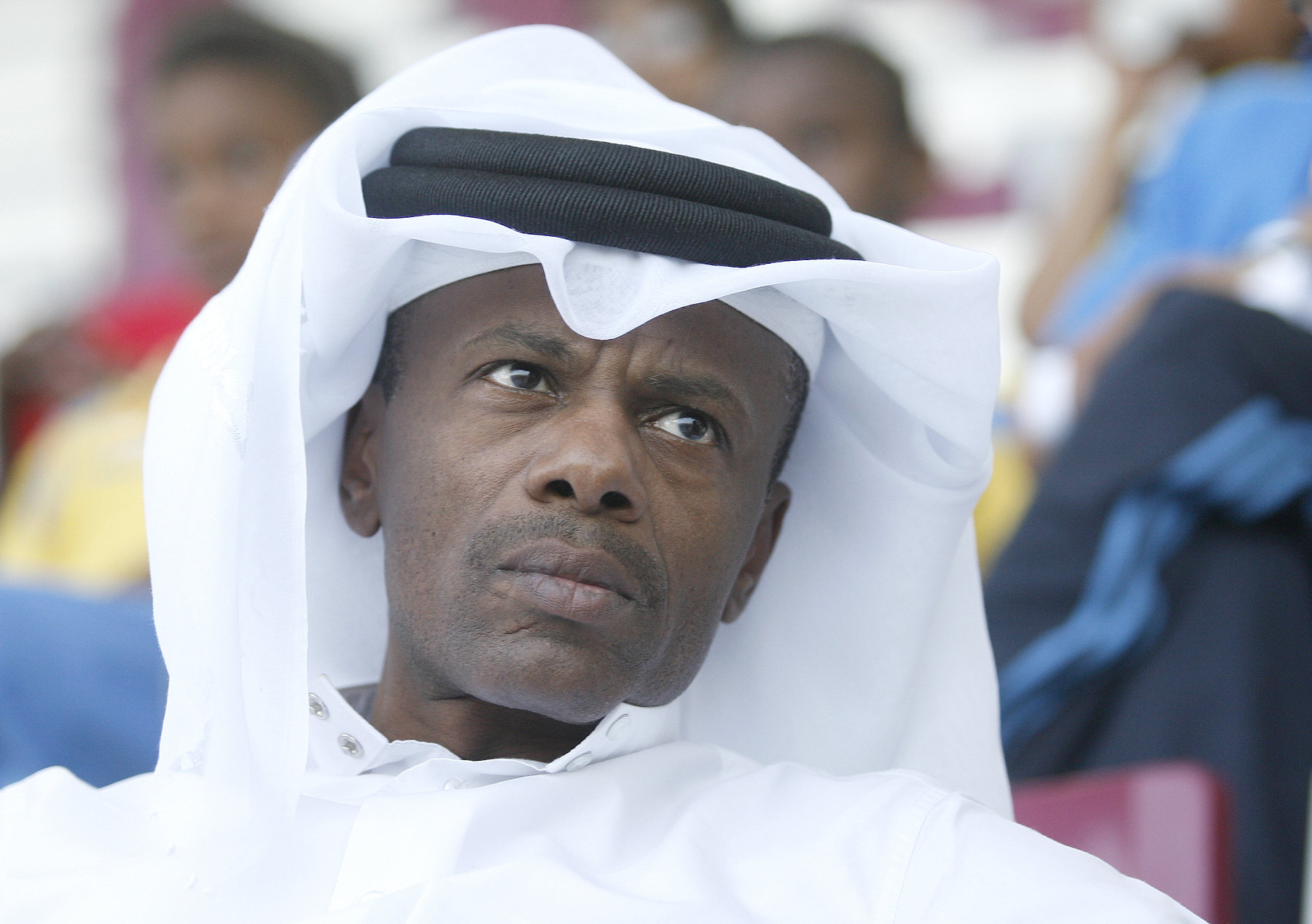

Medal record

Men's athletics

Representing Qatar

Asian Games
Gold medal – first place	1986 Seoul	100 m
Gold medal – first place	1990 Beijing	100 m
Gold medal – first place	1994 Hiroshima	100 m
Gold medal – first place	1994 Hiroshima	200 m
Bronze medal – third place	1994 Hiroshima	4×100 m relay

Asian Championships
Gold medal – first place	1987 Singapore	100 m
Gold medal – first place	1987 Singapore	200 m
Gold medal – first place	1987 Singapore	4×100 m
Gold medal – first place	1991 Kuala Lumpur	100 m
Gold medal – first place	1993 Manila	100 m
Silver medal – second place	1985 Jakarta	4×100 m
Bronze medal – third place	1989 New Delhi	4×100 m
Bronze medal – third place	1995 Jakarta	4×100 m

Talal Mansour Al-Rahim (Arabic: طلال منصور, born May 8, 1964) is a retired Qatari sprinter who competed mainly in the 100 metres. He held the Asian indoor record for 60 metres of 6.51 seconds.

== Early life and career ==
Mansour was born in Qatar's capital city, Doha. His parents were nomads who had emigrated to Doha from the Rub' al Khali desert. He received limited education and as a result of few employment opportunities he joined the Qatar Armed Forces when he was 17 years old. From a young age, he participated in basketball, swimming and athletics. In 1983, when he was 19 years old, his coach Uli Kunst encouraged him to focus solely on athletics. Initially a high jumper, he adapted into a sprinter under Kunst's guidance.

He set a Qatari record in June 1985 when he achieved a time of 10.58 in the 100 metres category at the Leverkusen Championship held in West Germany. In September of that year, he participated in the 1985 Asian Athletics Championships, finishing in 4th place in the 100 metres category. Consequently, he received little recognition for his accolade at the time, having been overshadowed by the top 3 contenders.

In the 1986 Asian Games, he achieved a gold medal. During the tournament, most of the media initially centered on Zheng Chen, the Asian record holder at the time. However, Mansour's high knee-lift and power running technique impressed many spectators. He knocked off Anat Ratanapol in the semi-finals, clocking a time of 10.32. He clocked a time of 10.30 in the final, and may have had a possibility of surpassing the Asian record at the time had he not decided to play to the audience by raising his arms in triumph before he hit the tape.

He set an Asian record in the 60 metre sprint on 3 March 1993 in the annual LBBW Meeting where he clocked a time of 6.51. He also received a bronze medal in the men's 60 metre sprint at the 1993 IAAF World Indoor Championships, making him the first sprinter from Qatar to win a medal in global athletics.

After retiring from athletics, he was installed as a member of the board of directors of Al Sadd Sports Club.

== Achievements ==
- 1994 Asian Games - gold medal (200 metres)
- 1994 Asian Games - gold medal
- 1993 IAAF World Indoor Championships - bronze medal
- 1993 Asian Athletics Championships - gold medal
- 1992 Pan Arab Games - gold medal (200 m)
- 1992 Pan Arab Games - gold medal
- 1991 Asian Athletics Championships - gold medal
- 1990 Asian Games - gold medal
- 1987 Asian Athletics Championships - gold medal (200 m)
- 1987 Asian Athletics Championships - gold medal
- 1986 Asian Games - gold medal
