= Athletics at the 1985 Summer Universiade – Women's marathon =

The women's marathon event at the 1985 Summer Universiade was held at the Kobe Universiade Memorial Stadium in Kobe on 1 September 1985.

== Results ==
Rank	Athlete	Nationality	Time	Notes
1st place, gold medalist(s)	Mami Fukao	Japan	2:44:55	
2nd place, silver medalist(s)	Patti Gray	United States	2:46:20	
3rd place, bronze medalist(s)	Sylvie Bornet	France	2:48:11	
4	Kathy Pfiefer	United States	2:53:35	
5	Antonella Bizioli	Italy	2:54:09	
6	Kikuyo Nishijima	Japan	3:09:03	
7	Yu Quiuli	China	3:21:48	
8	Naomi Kuruhashi	Japan	3:27:06	
	Irina Petrova	Soviet Union	DNF	
	Xiao Hongyan	China	DNF	
