= M. Tamil Selvan =

Indian weightlifter (born 1955)

Personal information
- Full name: Muniswamy Tamil Selvan
- Nationality: Indian
- Born: 3 February 1955 (age 71) Vellore, Tamil Nadu, India

Sport
- Country: India
- Sport: Weightlifting
Medal record
Men's weightlifting
Representing India
Commonwealth Games
Silver medal – second place	1978 Edmonton	Bantamweight – Overall
Silver medal – second place	1982 Brisbane	Featherweight - Overall
- Updated on 26 OCtober 2020

Muniswamy Tamil Selvan (born 3 February 1955) is a former Indian weightlifter. He competed in the men's bantamweight event at the 1980 Summer Olympics. He won silver medals in the men's Bantamweight event at 1978 Commonwealth Games and in the men's Featherweight event at 1982 Commonwealth Games. He was conferred with the Arjuna Award in the year 1977-78 by the Government of India.

== See also ==
- List of people from Vellore
- List of Tamil recipients of the Arjuna Award
