= Kim Won-jin =

Kim Won-jin may refer to:

- Kim Won-jin (athlete) (born 1968)
- Kim Won-jin (fencer) (born 1984)
- Kim Won-jin (judoka) (born 1992)
