= Mikhalchenko =

Mykhalchenko is a Ukrainian patronymic surname that derives from the first name Myhailo (Ukrainian equivalent of Michael). Its Russian-language spelling is Mikhalchenko.

The surname may refer to:

- Larisa Mikhalchenko, Ukrainian discus thrower
- Iryna Mykhalchenko, Ukrainian high jumper
- Alla Mikhalchenko (born 1957), Soviet ballerina, Bolshoi Theatre
