= Misako Miyahara =

Japanese long-distance runner

Misako Miyahara (宮原 美佐子; born May 29, 1962) is a retired long-distance runner from Japan. She represented her native country in the women's marathon at the 1988 Summer Olympics in Seoul, South Korea, alongside Eriko Asai and Kumi Araki. She won the silver medal in the women's marathon at the 1986 Asian Games in Seoul, South Korea.

== International competitions ==
Year	Competition	Venue	Position	Event	Notes
Representing Japan
1986	Asian Games	Seoul, South Korea	2nd	Marathon	2:41:36
1988	Olympic Games	Seoul, South Korea	29th	Marathon	2:35:26
