= Athletics at the 1987 Summer Universiade – Women's marathon =

The women's marathon event at the 1987 Summer Universiade was held in Zagreb on 19 July 1987.

== Results ==
Rank	Athlete	Nationality	Time	Notes
1st place, gold medalist(s)	Natalya Bardina	Soviet Union	2:46:30	
2nd place, silver medalist(s)	Takako Kanesashi	Japan	2:46:33	
3rd place, bronze medalist(s)	Karlene Erickson	United States	3:03:00	
4	Dimitra Papaspirou	Greece	3:06:48	
6	Mary Tracey	United States	3:15:15	
7	Yu Song Hui	North Korea	3:16:09	
8	Abdelhadir Nadiri	Sudan	6:20:46	
	Gabriella Stramaccioni	Italy	DNF	
	Irina Yagodina	Soviet Union	DNF	
	Charulata Naigaonkar	India	DNF	
	Elena Murgoci	Romania	DNF	
	Cho Yong Ok	North Korea	DNF	
	Muaka Nlandu	Zaire	DNF	
	Asha Aggarwal	India	DNF	
