= Shiny Abraham =

Indian athlete (born 1965)

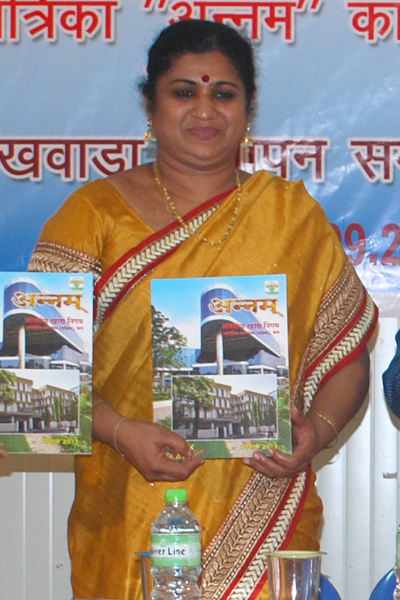
- Abraham in 2013

Personal information
- Full name: Shiny Kurisingal Abraham-Wilson
- Nationality: Indian
- Born: 8 May 1965 (age 61) Thodupuzha, Idukki, Kerala, India

Sport
- Country: India
- Sport: Track and field
- Events: 400 meters 800 meters

Achievements and titles
- Personal bests: 400 m: 52.12 (1995); 800 m: 1:59.85 (1995)
Medal record
Women's athletics
Representing India
Asian Championships
Gold medal – first place	1985 Jakarta	800 m
Gold medal – first place	1989 New Delhi	800 m
Gold medal – first place	1989 New Delhi	4×400 m
Gold medal – first place	1991 Kuala Lumpur	400 m
Gold medal – first place	1991 Kuala Lumpur	4×100 m
Silver medal – second place	1985 Jakarta	400 m
Silver medal – second place	1989 New Delhi	400 m
Silver medal – second place	1991 Kuala Lumpur	800 m
Silver medal – second place	1993 Manila	4×400 m
Silver medal – second place	1995 Jakarta	4×400 m
Bronze medal – third place	1995 Jakarta	400 m
Bronze medal – third place	1995 Jakarta	800 m
Asian Games
Gold medal – first place	1986 Seoul	4×100 m
Silver medal – second place	1986 Seoul	400 m
Silver medal – second place	1994 Hiroshima	4×100 m
Bronze medal – third place	1994 Hiroshima	800 m

Shiny Kurisingal Wilson (nee Abraham, born 8 May 1965) is a retired Indian athlete. She has been a National Champion in 800 metres for 14 years. Shiny Abraham Wilson (Shiny Abraham) represented India more than 75 times in international competition. She holds the added distinction of representing Asia in four World Cups. She is also perhaps the only athlete to have taken part in six Asian Track & Field Meets in a row beginning 1985 in Jakarta. During this period she won seven gold, five silver and two bronze medals in the Asian competitions. She collected a total of 18 gold and two silver medals from the seven South Asian Federation (SAF) Meets she has competed.

== Early life ==
Born at Thodupuzha in Idukki district of Kerala on 8 May 1965, Shiny became interested in athletics as a child but developed her skills after joining the sports division in Kottayam.

In fact Shiny, PT Usha and M D Valsamma studied at the same sports division in various parts of Kerala and as they grew up, they were coached by the NIS coach P. J Devasia.

Shiny was then trained at G.V. Raja Sports School in Trivandrum before she moved to Alphonsa College in Palai.

She is currently the Indian team selector and government nominee for selection committee board.

== Career ==
Shiny Abraham's athletics career ran alongside that of PT Usha from the time the two of them represented the country in the Asian Games in New Delhi in 1982. Shiny became national champion in the 800 metres a year before the Asian Games in Delhi.

She cut into the inner lane and was disqualified while very much in front of the field during the 1986 Asian Games in Seoul. At the 1992 Barcelona Olympics, she became the first woman to be the flag bearer for India at the Olympics.

Her most memorable competition was the Asian Track & Field Meet at Delhi in 1989, despite being pregnant, she ran the 800;meters to come second behind Sun Sumei of China but Shiny was declared the winner as Sumei tested positive for doping. One of her greatest achievements was that she was running even faster after the birth of her child and she set a new record of 1:59.85 in the 800m race at the 1995 South Asian Federation (SAF) Games in Chennai.

Shiny married swimmer Wilson Cherian in December 1988.

Shiny was awarded the Arjuna Award in 1985, Birla Award in 1996 and Padma Shri in 1998. she is also the recipient of Chinese Journalists Award 1991 for being one of the Top Ten Athletes of Asia.

== Participation ==
Shiny Abraham has participated in four Olympic Games: Los Angeles (1984), Seoul (1988), Barcelona (1992) and Atlanta(1996).

Although she didn't win any medals at any of the four Olympics, she and P.T. Usha powered India to an unexpected Women's 4X400 relay final at the 1984 Games.

She was also the captain of the Indian Contingent at the 1992 Games.

She has also represented India in three Asian Games and has won a Gold, 2 Silvers and a Bronze.

In the Asian Track and Field meets, she has won 7 Gold Medals, 6 Silver Medals and 2 Bronze Medals.

Represented India for more than 75 Times .

First Indian Women athlete to reach the semi-finals in Olympics in women's 800m

First Indian woman captain and flag bearer for Indian Contingent for 1996 Atlanta Olympics

== Awards ==
- She received the Arjuna award in 1984
- She received Chinese journalist award 1991 From Chinese Government For her Outstanding Achievement in Sports
- She was conferred Padma Shri, India's fourth highest civilian award in 1998.
- She was honoured with Birla Award in 1998.
- In 2002, she Was Honoured by the UNICEF, Los Angeles and had presented a paper presentation on behalf of Asia
- In 2009, she was awarded Lifetime Achievement Award From CNN IBN at Delhi
- In 2012, she was Awarded Lifetime Achievement Award From JFW Achievers Award in Chennai
- In 2012, she was awarded Lifetime Achievement Award From Sun Networks for Women Achievers for the Field of Sports

== See also ==
- List of Indian women athletes
- List of Kerala Olympians
- List of Indian records in athletics

Olympic Games
Preceded by Kartar Singh	Flagbearer for India; Barcelona 1992	Succeeded by Pargat Singh
