= Yu Hourun =

Chinese discus thrower (born 1964)

Medal record

Women's athletics

Representing China

Asian Championships
| Gold medal – first place | 1989 New Delhi | Discus throw |
| Silver medal – second place | 1985 Jakarta | Discus throw |

Yu Hourun (Chinese: 于 厚潤; born 9 July 1964 in Jilin) is a retired Chinese discus thrower.

Her personal best throw was 68.62 metres, achieved in May 1988 in Beijing. The Chinese, and Asian, record is currently held by Xiao Yanling with 71.68 metres.

== Achievements ==
| Year | Competition | Venue | Position | Notes |
Representing China
| 1985 | Asian Championships | Djakarta, Indonesia | 2nd | |
| 1987 | World Championships | Rome, Italy | 17th | 56.70 m |
| 1988 | Olympic Games | Seoul, South Korea | 9th | 64.08 m |
| 1989 | Asian Championships | New Delhi, India | 1st | 61.92 CR |
| 1990 | Asian Games | Beijing, China | 2nd | |
