= Xing Ailan =

Chinese discus thrower

Personal information
- Nationality: Chinese
- Born: 23 February 1965 (age 61)

Sport
- Sport: Athletics
- Event: Discus throw
Medal record
Women's athletics
Representing China
Asian Championships
Gold medal – first place	1987 Singapore	Discus throw

Xing Ailan (born 23 February 1965) is a Chinese athlete. She competed in the women's discus throw at the 1988 Summer Olympics.
