= 1987 World Championships in Athletics – Women's discus throw =

These are the official results of the Women's Discus Throw event at the 1987 World Championships in Rome, Italy. There were a total number of 23 participating athletes, with the final held on Monday August 31, 1987.

== Medalists ==
Gold	Martina Hellmann; East Germany (GDR)
Silver	Diana Gansky; East Germany (GDR)
Bronze	Tsvetanka Khristova; Bulgaria (BUL)

== Schedule ==
- All times are Central European Time (UTC+1)

Qualification Round
Group A	Group B
30.08.1987 – ??:??h	30.08.1987 – ??:??h
Final Round
31.08.1987 – 18:00h

== Abbreviations ==
- All results shown are in metres

Q	automatic qualification
q	qualification by rank
DNS	did not start
NM	no mark
WR	world record
AR	area record
NR	national record
PB	personal best
SB	season best

== Records ==
Standing records prior to the 1987 World Athletics Championships
World Record	Zdeňka Šilhavá (TCH)	74.56 m	August 26, 1984	Nitra, Czechoslovakia
Event Record	Martina Hellmann (GDR)	68.94 m	August 10, 1983	Helsinki, Finland
Broken records during the 1987 World Athletics Championships
Event Record	Martina Opitz-Hellmann (GDR)	71.62 m	August 31, 1987	Rome, Italy

== Qualification ==
=== Group A ===
Rank	Overall	Athlete	Attempts			Distance
Rank	Overall	Athlete	1	2	3	Distance
1	5	Diana Gansky (GDR)				63.64 m
2	6	Svetla Mitkova (BUL)				62.80 m
3	7	Larisa Mikhalchenko (URS)				62.52 m
4	9	Maritza Martén (CUB)				60.40 m
5	10	Connie Price-Smith (USA)				59.90 m
6	11	Mariana Lengyel (ROU)				59.72 m
7	16	Anne Paavolainen-Kansakangas (FIN)				57.10 m
8	17	Yu Hourun (CHN)				56.70 m
9	20	Nabila Mouelhi (TUN)				45.94 m
10	21	Hanane Ahmed Khaled (EGY)				42.64 m
11	22	Dorie Cortejo (PHI)				40.98 m
12	23	Morgyn Warner (ZIM)				38.56 m

=== Group B ===
Rank	Overall	Athlete	Attempts			Distance
Rank	Overall	Athlete	1	2	3	Distance
1	1	Ilke Wyludda (GDR)				68.40 m
2	2	Tsvetanka Khristova (BUL)				66.86 m
3	3	Martina Hellmann (GDR)				66.80 m
4	4	Zdeňka Šilhavá (TCH)				64.64 m
5	8	Larisa Korotkevich (URS)				60.48 m
6	12	Renata Katewicz (POL)				58.88 m
7	13	Carol Cady (USA)				58.50 m
8	14	Hou Xuemei (CHN)				58.26 m
9	15	Anne Salak-Khorina (URS)				57.76 m
10	18	María Isabel Urrutia (COL)				53.94 m
11	19	Maria Marello (ITA)				52.74 m

== Final ==
Rank	Athlete	Attempts						Distance	Notes
Rank	Athlete	1	2	3	4	5	6	Distance	Notes
1st place, gold medalist(s)	Martina Hellmann (GDR)	71.08	68.90	69.66	71.62	X	67.86	71.62 m	CR
2nd place, silver medalist(s)	Diana Gansky (GDR)	66.64	67.50	70.12	68.78	65.42	X	70.12 m	
3rd place, bronze medalist(s)	Tsvetanka Khristova (BUL)	63.72	66.10	65.38	63.36	68.82	68.80	68.82 m	
4	Ilke Wyludda (GDR)	68.20	62.60	62.06	67.64	67.06	67.44	68.20 m	
5	Svetla Mitkova (BUL)	64.86	65.44	65.48	65.58	X	66.58	66.58 m	
6	Zdeňka Šilhavá (TCH)	64.34	64.82	X	64.46	64.03	63.88	64.82 m	
7	Larisa Mikhalchenko (URS)	64.18	64.72	59.72	63.66	60.68	63.54	64.72 m	PB
8	Mariana Lengyel (ROU)	62.30	59.28	59.54	X	58.14	60.86	62.30 m	
9	Maritza Martén (CUB)							62.00 m	
10	Larisa Korotkevich (URS)							60.74 m	
11	Renata Katewicz (POL)							58.22 m	
—	Connie Price-Smith (USA)							NM	
