= Liu Huajin =

Chinese hurdler (born 1960)

Personal information
- Nationality: Chinese
- Born: 2 August 1960 (age 65)

Sport
- Sport: Track and field
- Event: 100 metres hurdles
Medal record
Women's athletics
Representing China
Asian Championships
Gold medal – first place	1985 Jakarta	100 m hurdles
Gold medal – first place	1989 New Delhi	100 m hurdles
Gold medal – first place	1989 New Delhi	4×100 m
Silver medal – second place	1983 Kuwait City	100 m hurdles
Silver medal – second place	1985 Jakarta	4×100 m

Liu Huajin (born 2 August 1960) is a Chinese hurdler. She competed in the 100 metres hurdles at the 1984 Summer Olympics and the 1988 Summer Olympics.
