= P. T. Usha =

Indian track and field athlete

P. T. Usha OLY
Personal information
- Nicknames: Golden Girl, Payyoli Express
- Nationality: Indian
- Born: Pilavullakandi Thekkeparambil Usha; 27 June 1964 (age 62) Koothali, Perambra, Kozhikode district, Kerala, India
- Years active: 1976–2000
- Height: 171 cm (5 ft 7 in)
- Spouse: V. Srinivasan (m. 1991; died 2026)

13th President of the Indian Olympic Association
- Incumbent
- Assumed office 10 December 2022
- Preceded by: Adille Sumariwalla

Member of Parliament, Rajya Sabha
- Incumbent
- Assumed office 7 July 2022
- Nominated by: Ram Nath Kovind
- Preceded by: M. C. Mary Kom
- Constituency: Nominated (Sports)

Sport
- Sport: Track and field
- Event: Sprints

Achievements and titles
- Personal bests: 100 m: 11.39 (Jakarta 1985); 200 m: 23.05 (Lucknow 1999); 400 m: 51.61 (Canberra 1985); 400 m hurdles: 55.42 NR (Los Angeles 1984)
Medal record
Women's athletics
Representing India
Asian Games
Gold medal – first place	1986 Seoul	200 m
Gold medal – first place	1986 Seoul	400 m
Gold medal – first place	1986 Seoul	400 m hurdles
Gold medal – first place	1986 Seoul	4x400 m relay
Silver medal – second place	1982 New Delhi	100 m
Silver medal – second place	1982 New Delhi	200 m
Silver medal – second place	1986 Seoul	100 m
Silver medal – second place	1990 Beijing	400 m
Silver medal – second place	1990 Beijing	4x100 m relay
Silver medal – second place	1990 Beijing	4x400 m relay
Silver medal – second place	1994 Hiroshima	4x400 m relay
Asian Championships
Gold medal – first place	1983 Kuwait City	400m
Gold medal – first place	1985 Jakarta	100m
Gold medal – first place	1985 Jakarta	200m
Gold medal – first place	1985 Jakarta	400m
Gold medal – first place	1985 Jakarta	400m hurdles
Gold medal – first place	1985 Jakarta	4×400m Relay
Gold medal – first place	1987 Singapore	400m
Gold medal – first place	1987 Singapore	400m hurdles
Gold medal – first place	1987 Singapore	4×400m Relay
Gold medal – first place	1989 New Delhi	200m
Gold medal – first place	1989 New Delhi	400m
Gold medal – first place	1989 New Delhi	400m hurdles
Gold medal – first place	1989 New Delhi	4×400m Relay
Gold medal – first place	1998 Fukuoka	4×100m Relay
Silver medal – second place	1983 Kuwait	200m
Silver medal – second place	1987 Singapore	100m
Silver medal – second place	1987 Singapore	4×100m Relay
Silver medal – second place	1989 New Delhi	100m
Silver medal – second place	1989 New Delhi	200m
Silver medal – second place	1998 Fukuoka	4×400m Relay
Bronze medal – third place	1985 Jakarta	4×100m Relay
Bronze medal – third place	1998 Fukuoka	200m
Bronze medal – third place	1998 Fukuoka	400m

P. T. Usha (born 27 June 1964) is an Indian sports administrator, parliamentarian and retired track and field athlete. She was born in Koothali near Perambra in Kozhikode district, Kerala, and grew up in Payyoli. Usha has been associated with Indian athletics since 1979. She has won a total of four gold and seven silver medals in the Asian Games. She is often associated as the "Queen of Indian track and field".

In July 2022, she was nominated as a Member of Parliament to the Rajya Sabha, the upper house of the Indian Parliament. In December 2022, she was elected president of the Indian Olympic Association unopposed. That same month, she was appointed to the panel of Rajya Sabha vice-chairman to control the proceedings of the upper house during the absence of both Chairman and Deputy Chairman. Usha is the first nominated parliamentarian in history to become the vice-chairperson of the Rajya Sabha.

== Track and field career ==
In 1976, the Kerala State Government started a Sports division for women in Kannur, and Usha started practicing under the guidance of coach O. M. Nambiar in 1977 as one among the forty girl athletes in sports division Kannur. Nambiar was an athletics coach and had taken notice of Usha at a sports prize-distribution ceremony. In an interview with Rediff.com in 2000, he recalled: "What impressed me at first sight about Usha was her lean shape and fast walking style. I knew she could become a very good sprinter." The same year, he began coaching her. Quick results followed when she won six medals at the inter-state meet for juniors, in Kollam in 1978, with four gold medals in 100 m, 200 m, 60 m hurdles and high jump, silver in long jump and bronze in 4 x 100 m relay. In the year's Kerala State college meet, she won 14 medals. She went on to win multiple medals at the 1979 National Games and 1980 National inter-state meet setting many meet records. She participated in her first international event at the Qaid-e-Azam invitation meet in Karachi, Pakistan, in 1980, where she won four gold medals.

At the senior inter-country meeting in Bangalore in 1981, Usha clocked 11.6 seconds in the 100 m and 24.8 seconds in the 200 m setting national records in both. At the 1982 New Delhi Asian Games, she won silver medals in 100 m and 200 m, clocking 11.95 s and 25.32 s. At the 1983 Open National Championships in Jamshedpur, she broke the 200 m national record again clocking 23.9 s, and with 53.6 s, set a new national record in 400 m. At the Asian Championships in Kuwait City the same year, she won gold in 400 m.

=== 1984 Los Angeles Olympics ===
Usha's best moment came at the 1984 Los Angeles Olympics. She entered on the back of a string of good performances at the year's New Delhi inter-state meet and Mumbai Open National Championships. However, poor performances in 100m and 200m at the Moscow World Championships prompted her to concentrate on the 400 m hurdles. At the Olympic trials in Delhi, she beat Asian Champion M. D. Valsamma to qualify for the Games. At another pre-Olympic trials, she clocked 55.7 seconds beating American top sprinter Judi Brown. At the Games, she clocked 56.81 s in the heats and 55.94 s in the semi-final, setting a new Commonwealth record as she entered the final. At the final, she came fourth, at 55.42 seconds, falling behind the eventual bronze medalist by 1/100 of a second. This followed after one of her competitors had a false start, which was said to have "broken her rhythm" as "she got off the blocks a bit slower at the restart."

In the 1985 Jakarta Asian Championships, Usha won six medals — five gold and one bronze. She won the 100 m in 11.64, 200 m in 23.005, 400 m in 52.52, an Asian record, and 400 m hurdles in 56.64, with the final two coming in a span of 35 minutes. Her fifth gold came in 4 x 400 m relay, and a final bronze in 4 x 100 m. She set a record in the process for most gold medals won at a single event in the history of the championships. In the first two of her wins, she equalled the Asian record held by Chi Cheng of Taiwan. She went on to better her personal best in 400 m a week later at the 1985 Canberra World Cup, when she clocked 51.61, finishing seventh. She almost replicated her Jakarta Championships performance at the 1986 Seoul Asian Games. She won the 100 metres silver with a time of 11.67 seconds losing the gold to Lydia de Vega. The 200 metres gold came in 23.44, 400 metres gold in 52.16 and 4 x 400 m relay gold in 3:34.58, all of which were new Games records. At the Games, British athletics coach Jim Alford said of her, "Usha is a first class athlete, a tough competitor and a terrific runner to watch. She has all the potential. Given careful guidance, she can be world class."

I never wanted to be an Olympian. All I wanted was to keep breaking my own record. I never competed to defeat anybody. —P. T. Usha

=== Later stage ===
From 1983–89, Usha garnered 13 golds at ATF meets. In the 10th Asian Games held at Seoul in 1986, Usha won 4 gold medals and 1 silver medal in the track and field events. She also won five gold medals at the 6th Asian Track and Field Championship in Jakarta in 1985. Her medals at the same meet is a record for a single athlete in a single international meet.

Currently she is committee head of Indian Talent organization which conducts the National Level Indian Talent Olympiad examinations in schools across India. Usha retired from her active sports career in 2000.

== Nomination to the Rajya Sabha ==
In July 2022, Usha was nominated by President of India, Ram Nath Kovind, as a Member of Parliament (MP) of the Rajya Sabha, the upper house of the Indian Parliament. In December 2022, She was appointed as one of the vice-chairpersons of the Rajya Sabha and become the first nominated MP to be in the Vice Chairperson panel. On 8 February 2023, Usha chaired the Sabha.

== Sports administration ==
Since retiring from her sports career in 2000, Usha had given no inclination of entering sports administration, however, in December 2022, she was elected as the president of the Indian Olympic Association (IOA) in an election where she ran unopposed. She also became the first woman to be elected president of the IOA.

== Achievements ==
Usha represented India in 4 x 100 metres relay together with Valdivel Jayalakshmi, Rachita Mistry, and E.B. Shyla at the 1998 Asian Championships in Athletics, where her team won the gold medal, setting a national record of 44.43 s.

== Personal life ==
Usha studied in Providence Women's College in Kozhikode.

Usha married V. Srinivasan, an English inspector with Central Industrial Security Force, in 1991. The couple has two sons, Dr. Vignesh Ujjwal. Srinivasan died on 30 January 2026, at the age of 67.

== Advisor ==
Currently, she is a member of the Board of Advisors of India's International Movement to Unite Nations (I.I.M.U.N.).

== Awards and honours ==
- Arjuna Award in 1984
- Padma Shri in 1985
- Honorary doctorate (D.Litt) conferred by Kannur University in 2000
- Honorary doctorate (D.Sc) conferred by IIT Kanpur in 2017
- Honorary doctorate (D.Litt) conferred by University of Calicut in 2018
- IAAF Veteran Pin in 2019
- Honorary doctorate (D.Litt) conferred by Central University of Kerala in 2023

== Statistics ==
=== International competitions ===
Year	Competition	Venue	Position	Event	Result
1980	Olympic Games	Moscow, Russia	5th (heats)	100 metres	12.27
1982	Asian Games	New Delhi, India	2nd	100 metres	11.67
1982	Asian Games	New Delhi, India	2nd	200 metres	24.32
1983	Asian Championships	Kuwait City, Kuwait	2nd	200 metres	24.68
1983	Asian Championships	Kuwait City, Kuwait	1st	400 metres	54.20
1984	Olympic Games	Los Angeles, USA	4th	400 metres hurdles	55.42 AR
1984	Olympic Games	Los Angeles, USA	7th	4 × 400 m relay	3:32.49
1985	Asian Championships	Jakarta, Indonesia	1st	100 metres	11.64 AR
1985	Asian Championships	Jakarta, Indonesia	1st	200 metres	23.05 AR
1985	Asian Championships	Jakarta, Indonesia	1st	400 metres	52.62 AR
1985	Asian Championships	Jakarta, Indonesia	1st	400 metres hurdles	56.64
1985	Asian Championships	Jakarta, Indonesia	3rd	4 × 100 m relay	45.22
1985	Asian Championships	Jakarta, Indonesia	1st	4 x 400 m relay	3:34.10
1985	World Cup	Canberra, Australia	7th	400 metres	51.61 AR
1985	World Cup	Canberra, Australia	5th	400 metres hurdles	56.35
1985	World Cup	Canberra, Australia	8th	4 x 400 m relay	3:37.59
1986	Asian Games	Seoul, South Korea	2nd	100 metres	11.67
1986	Asian Games	Seoul, South Korea	1st	200 metres	23.44 GR
1986	Asian Games	Seoul, South Korea	1st	400 metres	52.16 GR
1986	Asian Games	Seoul, South Korea	1st	400 metres hurdles	56.06 GR
1986	Asian Games	Seoul, South Korea	1st	4 x 400 m relay	3:34.58 GR
1987	Asian Championships	Singapore	2nd	100 metres	11.74
1987	Asian Championships	Singapore	1st	400 metres	52.31
1987	Asian Championships	Singapore	1st	400 metres hurdles	56.48
1987	Asian Championships	Singapore	2nd	4 x 100 m relay	45.49
1987	Asian Championships	Singapore	1st	4 x 400 m relay	3:34.50
1987	World Championships	Rome, Italy	DNS (Note: P. T. Usha did not start (DNS) in the heats.)	400 metres	—
1987	World Championships	Rome, Italy	6th (semifinal)	400 metres hurdles	55.89
1987	World Championships	Rome, Italy	8th (heats)	4 x 400 m relay	3:31.55
1988	Olympic Games	Seoul, South Korea	7th (heats)	400 metre hurdles	59.55
1989	Asian Championships	New Delhi, India	2nd	100 metres	11.74
1989	Asian Championships	New Delhi, India	1st	200 metres	23.27
1989	Asian Championships	New Delhi, India	1st	400 metres	51.90
1989	Asian Championships	New Delhi, India	1st	400 metres hurdles	56.14
1989	Asian Championships	New Delhi, India	2nd	4 x 100 m relay	44.87
1989	Asian Championships	New Delhi, India	1st	4 x 400 m relay	3:32.95
1990	Asian Games	Beijing, China	4th	200 metres	24.29
1990	Asian Games	Beijing, China	2nd	400 metres	52.86
1990	Asian Games	Beijing, China	2nd	4 x 100 m relay	44.99
1990	Asian Games	Beijing, China	2nd	4 x 400 m relay	3:38.45
1994	Asian Games	Hiroshima, Japan	4th	200 metres	24.29
1994	Asian Games	Hiroshima, Japan	5th	4 x 100 relay	
1994	Asian Games	Hiroshima, Japan	2nd	4 x 400 m relay	3:33.34
1996	Olympic Games	Atlanta, USA	DSQ (Note: P. T. Usha was a reserve member of the team which was disqualified (DSQ).)	4 x 400 m relay	—
1998	Asian Championships	Fukuoka, Japan	3rd	200 metres	23.27
1998	Asian Championships	Fukuoka, Japan	3rd	400 metres	52.55
1998	Asian Championships	Fukuoka, Japan	1st	4 x 100 m relay	44.43
1998	Asian Championships	Fukuoka, Japan	2nd	4 x 400 m relay	3:34.04
1998	Asian Games	Bangkok, Thailand	6th	400 metres	54.37
1998	Asian Games	Bangkok, Thailand	4th	4 x 100 m relay	44.77

== See also ==
- List of Indian records in athletics
- List of Indian sportswomen
- List of Kerala Olympians
- Usha School of Athletics

== Notes ==
Civic offices
Preceded by Adille Sumariwalla	President of Indian Olympic Association; 2022–present	Incumbent
