= Hirofumi Sakai =

Japanese racewalker

Medal record

Men's athletics

Representing Japan

Asian Championships
Gold medal – first place	1989 New Delhi	20 km walk
Silver medal – second place	1993 Manila	20 km walk

Hirofumi Sakai (Japanese: 酒井 浩文; born February 10, 1965) is a retired Japanese male race walker. He competed for Japan at the 1988 Summer Olympics.

== International competitions ==
Representing Japan
Year	Competition	Venue	Position	Event	Notes
1988	Olympic Games	Seoul, South Korea	26th	20 km	
1989	Asian Championships	New Delhi, India	1st	20 km	
1990	Asian Games	Beijing, China	2nd	20 km	
1991	World Championships	Tokyo, Japan	—	20 km	DQ
1993	Asian Championships	Manila, Philippines	2nd	20 km	
1993	World Championships	Stuttgart, Germany	—	20 km	DQ
1993	World Championships	Stuttgart, Germany	32nd	50 km	
1997	East Asian Games	Busan, South Korea	3rd	20 km	
