= Cai Shangyan =

Chinese long-distance runner

Personal information
- Nationality: Chinese
- Born: 25 September 1962 (age 63)

Sport
- Sport: Long-distance running
- Event: Marathon
Medal record
Men's athletics
Representing China
Asian Championships
Gold medal – first place	1987 Singapore	10,000 m
Bronze medal – third place	1987 Singapore	5000 m

Cai Shangyan (Chinese: 蔡尚岩; pinyin: Cài Shàngyán, born 25 September 1962) is a Chinese long-distance runner. He competed in the men's marathon at the 1988 Summer Olympics. He is from Qingdao.
