= 1989 Asian Athletics Championships =

1989 Asian Championships
- Dates: 14–19 November
- Host city: New Delhi, India
- Venue: Jawaharlal Nehru Stadium
- Events: 40
- Participation: at least 19 nations

The 1989 Asian Athletics Championships was the eighth edition of the international outdoor athletics competition between Asian nations, organised by the Asian Athletics Association. The six-day competition was held from 14–19 November at the Jawaharlal Nehru Stadium in New Delhi, India. It featured 40 events, 22 for men and 18 for women, with the steeplechase, pole vault, triple jump and hammer throw competitions being for men only. China comfortably topped the medal table, winning over half the events with 21 golds among a total of 42. The host nation, India, was clear runner-up with eight golds and 22 medals, while Japan (14 medals) was the only other nation to breach double figures. A total of 19 nations reached the medal table.

India's P. T. Usha was the stand-out athlete of the tournament with four gold medals and one silver. She won the 200 metres, 400 metres, 400 metres hurdles and 4 × 400 metres relay, as well as being the 100 metres runner-up. Another Indian runner, Shiny Abraham, won the 800 metres and was second in the 400 m. China's Zhong Huandi claimed a distance double in the women's 3000 metres and 10,000 metres.

== Medal summary ==
=== Men ===
Event	Gold		Silver		Bronze	
100 metres	Zheng Chen; China	10.35	Li Tao; China	10.42	Takayuki Nakamichi; Japan	10.48
200 metres	Yoshiyuki Okuyama; Japan	20.80	Khalid Jouma Ibrahim; Bahrain	21.07	Cai Jianming; China	21.18
400 metres	Ibrahim Ismail Muftah; Qatar	45.6	Mohammed Al-Malki; Oman	45.62	Zhao Cunlin; China	46.68
800 metres	Faramarz Roustaeifar; Iran	1:51.36	Yoshikazu Tachi; Japan	1:51.42	Vijaya Kumaran; India	1:51.85
1500 metres	Bahadur Prasad; India	3:45.77	Ram Niwas; India	3:46.53	Mohamed Suleiman; Qatar	3:47.95
5000 metres	Zhang Guowei; China	13:52.37	Bahadur Prasad; India	13:58.93	Ryu Ok-hyon; North Korea	14:02.39
10,000 metres	Ryu Ok-hyon; North Korea	29:07.93	Zhang Guowei; China	29:14.01	Muhammad Mousa; Pakistan	29:18.78
3000 metres steeplechase	Deena Ram; India	8:48.46	Mohammed al-Dosari; Saudi Arabia	8:48.77	Mohamed Suleiman; Qatar	8:49.35
110 metres hurdles	Yu Zhicheng; China	14.18	Nagi Ghazi; Iraq	14.20	Osamu Matsue; Japan	14.36
400 metres hurdles	Hwang Hong-cheol; South Korea	50.29	Takashi Kiyokawa; Japan	50.94	Suleiman Houielah; Syria	51.26
4 × 100 metres relay	China; Li Tao; Cai Jianming; Li Feng; Zheng Chen	39.28	Japan; Naotaka Momota; Takayuki Nakamichi; Yoshihiro Kato; Yoshiyuki Okuyama	39.64	Qatar; Talal Mansour; Saad Muftah Mubarak Al-Kuwari; Rashid Sheban Marzouk; Jaseem Mahboob	39.89
4 × 400 metres relay	Japan; Isamu Murata; Shigeaki Matsunaga; Seiichi Ibe; Yoshikazu Tachi	3:07.20	India; Arjun Devaiah; P.V. Raju; Ayyapan Durai; C. Muralidharan	3:07.22	Malaysia; Mohamed Nordin Jadi; Kenny Martin; Ramasamy Haridas; Hamdi Jaafar	3:11.08
20 kilometres race walk	Hirofumi Sakai; Japan	1:33:41	Chen Helin; China	1:34:19	Baldev Singh; India	1:35:52
High jump	Cho Hyun-wook; South Korea	2.19	Liu Yunpeng; China	2.17	Abdullah Mohamed Al-Sheib; Qatar	2.14
Pole vault	Liang Xueren; China	5.40	Huang Weiping; China	5.20	Ku Chin-shui; Chinese Taipei	5.20
Long jump	Nai Hui-fang; Chinese Taipei	8.07w	Chen Zunrong; China	7.88	Kim Won-jin; South Korea	7.83
Triple jump	Chen Yanping; China	16.95	Du Benzhong; China	16.68	Nai Hui-fang; Chinese Taipei	16.65
Shot put	Balwinder Singh; India	18.16	Khalid Salman Al-Khalidi; Saudi Arabia	17.76	Shirappa D. Eashan; India	17.71
Discus throw	Zhang Jinglong; China	57.12	Hu Tao; China	56.02	Shakti Singh; India	55.60
Hammer throw	Bi Zhong; China	68.94	Nobuhiro Todoroki; Japan	66.04	Xie Yingqi; China	65.72
Javelin throw	Wang Wenzhong; China	76.38	Ghanem Mabrouk Zaid Johar; Kuwait	72.38	Wang Yao-Tsung; Chinese Taipei	71.94
Decathlon	Lee Fu-an; Chinese Taipei	7703	Gong Guohua; China	7649	Peng Huang-shu; Chinese Taipei	7119

=== Women ===
Event	Gold		Silver		Bronze	
100 metres	Zhang Caihua; China	11.65	P. T. Usha; India	11.74	Wang Huei-chen; Chinese Taipei	11.84
200 metres	P. T. Usha; India	23.27	Ashwini Nachappa; India	23.54	Zhang Xiaoqiong; China	23.88
400 metres	P. T. Usha; India	51.90	Shiny Abraham; India	52.40	Josephine Mary Singarayar; Malaysia	52.65
800 metres	Shiny Abraham; India	2:04.76	Rosa Kutty; India	2:07.75	Haruko Hashimoto; Japan	2:09.78
1500 metres	Khin Khin Htwe; Myanmar	4:21.06	Kim Chun-Mae; North Korea	4:23.75	Feng Yanbo; China	4:23.86
3000 metres	Zhong Huandi; China	9:05.20	Kim Chun-Mae; North Korea	9:11.55	Khin Khin Htwe; Myanmar	9:22.80
10,000 metres	Zhong Huandi; China	32:25.57	Mun Gyong-ae; North Korea	33:23.91	Paek Do-Jong; North Korea	34:00.38
100 metres hurdles	Liu Huajin; China	13.30	Feng Yinghua; China	13.54	Naomi Jojima; Japan	13.97
400 metres hurdles	P. T. Usha; India	56.14	Chen Yuying; China	56.24	Chen Dongmei; China	57.46
4 × 100 metres relay	China; Li Shuxiang; Liu Huajin; Zhang Caihua; Zhang Xiaoqiong	44.84	India; Kutty Saramma; PT Usha; Ashwini Nachappa; Sany Joseph	44.87	Thailand; Nednapa Chommuak; Ratjai Sripet; Pornpim Srisurat; Rewadee Srithoa	45.58
4 × 400 metres relay	India; PT Usha; Shiny Abraham; Mercy Matthews-Kuttan; Kutty Saramma	3:32.95	China; Sun Sumei; Zhang Xiaoqiong; Chen Juying; Chen Dongmei	3:37.13	Japan; Chizuko Akimoto; Kozue Tanaka; Haruko Hashimoto; Kimiko Yokoyama	3:45.18
10,000 metres race walk	Chen Yueling; China	48:59.86	Kavita Garari; India	50:30.90	Ma Kyin Lwan; Myanmar	50:32.92
High jump	Jin Ling; China	1.89	Kim Hui-seon; South Korea	1.87	Su Cun-Yueh; Chinese Taipei	1.81
Long jump	Liu Shuzhen; China	6.36	Elma Muros; Philippines	6.17	Reeth Abraham; India	6.15
Shot put	Huang Zhihong; China	19.69	Sui Xinmei; China	19.29	Chong Chun-Hwa; North Korea	14.53
Discus throw	Yu Hourun; China	61.92	Ikuko Kitamori; Japan	51.78	Pak In-Ok; North Korea	47.12
Javelin throw	Xin Xiaoli; China	58.30	Xu Demei; China	57.32	Emi Matsui; Japan	55.30
Heptathlon	Dong Yuping; China	6042	Ma Miaolan; China	6021	Ma Chun-ping; Chinese Taipei	5149

== Medal table ==
* Host nation (India)

Rank	Nation	Gold	Silver	Bronze	Total
1	China (CHN)	21	15	6	42
2	India (IND)*	8	9	5	22
3	Japan (JPN)	3	5	6	14
4	South Korea (KOR)	2	1	1	4
5	Chinese Taipei (TPE)	2	0	7	9
6	North Korea (PRK)	1	3	4	8
7	Qatar (QAT)	1	0	4	5
8	Myanmar (MYA)	1	0	2	3
9	Iran (IRN)	1	0	0	1
10	Saudi Arabia (KSA)	0	2	0	2
11	Bahrain (BHR)	0	1	0	1
11	Iraq (IRQ)	0	1	0	1
11	Kuwait (KUW)	0	1	0	1
11	Oman (OMN)	0	1	0	1
11	Philippines (PHI)	0	1	0	1
16	Malaysia (MAS)	0	0	2	2
17	Pakistan (PAK)	0	0	1	1
17	Syria (SYR)	0	0	1	1
17	Thailand (THA)	0	0	1	1
Totals (19 entries)		40	40	40	120

== See also ==
- 1989 in athletics (track and field)
