= Ji Zebiao =

Chinese pole vaulter (born 1964)

Personal information
- Born: 3 August 1964 (age 61) Ledong Li Autonomous County, China

Sport
- Sport: Track and field
Medal record
Representing China
Asian Championships
Gold medal – first place	1985 Jakarta	Pole vault
Asian Games
Gold medal – first place	1986 Seoul	Pole vault

Ji Zebiao (born 3 August 1964) is a Chinese former pole vaulter who competed in the 1984 Summer Olympics.
