= Ryu Tae-kyung =

South Korean runner

Personal information
- Nationality: South Korean
- Born: 27 August 1961 (age 64)

Sport
- Sport: Sprinting
- Event: 800 metres
Medal record
Men's athletics
Representing South Korea
Asian Games
Silver medal – second place	1986 Seoul	800 m
Silver medal – second place	1986 Seoul	1500 m
Asian Championships
Silver medal – second place	1987 Singapore	800 m
Bronze medal – third place	1985 Jakarta	800 m

Ryu Tae-kyung (born 27 August 1961) is a South Korean middle-distance runner. He competed in the men's 4 × 400 metres relay at the 1988 Summer Olympics.
