= Ryu Ok-hyon =

North Korean long-distance runner

Personal information
- Nationality: North Korean
- Born: 18 April 1965 (age 61)

Sport
- Sport: Long-distance running
- Event: Marathon
Medal record
Men's athletics
Representing North Korea
Asian Championships
Gold medal – first place	1989 New Delhi	10,000 m
Bronze medal – third place	1989 New Delhi	5000 m

Ryu Ok-hyon (born 18 April 1965) is a North Korean long-distance runner. He competed in the men's marathon at the 1992 Summer Olympics.
