= Zhang Xiaoqiong =

Chinese sprinter (born 1966)

Personal information
- Nationality: Chinese
- Born: 10 July 1966 (age 59)

Sport
- Sport: Sprinting
- Event: 200 metres
Medal record
Women's athletics
Representing China
Asian Championships
Gold medal – first place	1987 Singapore	4×100 m
Gold medal – first place	1989 New Delhi	4×100 m
Silver medal – second place	1989 New Delhi	4×400 m
Bronze medal – third place	1989 New Delhi	200 m

Zhang Xiaoqiong (Chinese: 张小琼, born 10 July 1966) is a Chinese sprinter. She competed in the women's 200 metres at the 1988 Summer Olympics.
