= Xiao Hongyan =

Chinese long-distance runner

Personal information
- Born: 26 January 1965 (age 61) Rushan, Shandong, China

Sport
- Sport: Long-distance running
Medal record
Representing China
Asian Games
Bronze medal – third place	1986 Seoul	10,000 m

Xiao Hongyan (Chinese: 肖紅艷; pinyin: Xiāo Hóngyàn; born 26 January 1965) is a former Chinese long-distance runner. She was the bronze medallist in the 10,000 metres at the 1986 Asian Games and won the 1988 Rotterdam Marathon. Her personal best of 2:32:11 hours is a former Chinese record for the marathon.

Born in Rushan, Shandong, she started out as a middle-distance runner and won the national junior 800 metres and 1500 metres titles in 1982. She quickly moved up to the marathon distance and came third in the event at the 1983 Chinese National Games. She won the Chinese senior title over 10,000 metres at the 1986 national championships and gained selection for the 1986 Asian Games as a result. She was primarily instructed to run tactically to provide the more talented Wang Xiuting with a chance to win the title. Her team mate won the race while Xiao finished behind Japan's Kumi Araki to take the bronze medal.

In respect of this achievement, she was entered into the marathon at the 1987 Chinese National Games and she won the gold medal in a career best performance of 2:32:11 hours. This time was a Chinese national record for the event, although it lasted less than a year as Zhao Youfeng ran faster in March 1988. She was given permission to compete at the Rotterdam Marathon in April 1988 and she became the race's first Asian champion, winning in a time of 2:37:46 hours.

She retired from competition and became a coach in the Shandong Province from 1992 onwards. She has trained athletes to an international junior standard, including Sun Guanghong and Li Yunxia. In recognition of her achievements, she has received National Labor Medals from her Province and received merits from the regional sports committee.
