= Sany Joseph =

Indian sprinter

Personal information
- Nationality: Indian

Sport
- Country: India
- Sport: Athletics
Medal record
Women's athletics
Representing India
Asian Championships
Gold medal – first place	1987 Singapore	4×400 m
Silver medal – second place	1987 Singapore	4×100 m
Silver medal – second place	1989 New Delhi	4×100 m
Silver medal – second place	1991 Kuala Lumpur	4×100 m

Sany Joseph is an Indian athlete. She won a gold medal in 4 × 400 m relay and a silver medal in the 4 × 100 m relay in the 1987 Asian Athletics Championships.She won a silver medal in the 4 × 100 m relay in the 1989 Asian Athletics Championships.
