= Diana Gansky =

German track and field athlete (born 1963)

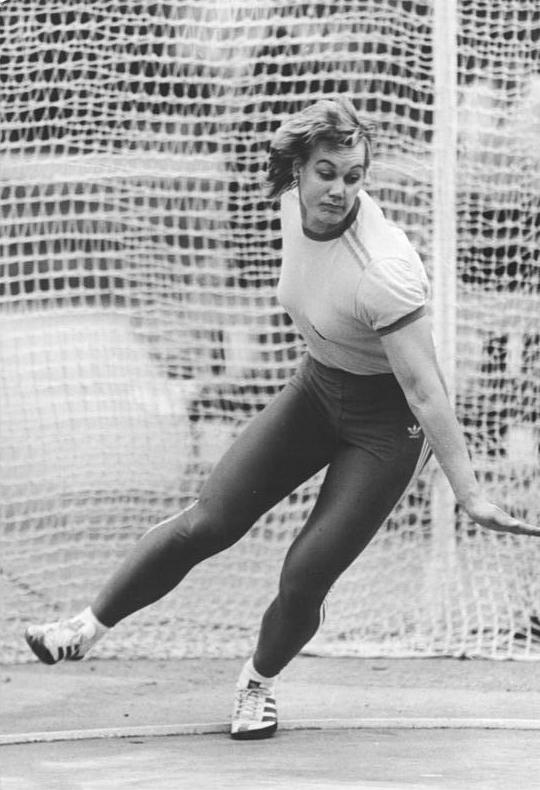
- Diana Gansky in 1987

Personal information
- Born: Diana Sachse; 14 December 1963 (age 62) Bergen auf Rügen, Bezirk Rostock, East Germany
- Height: 1.84 m (6 ft 0 in)
- Weight: 92 kg (203 lb)

Sport
- Country: East Germany (1981–1988)
- Sport: Athletics
- Event: Discus throw
- Club: ASK Vorwärts Potsdam

Achievements and titles
- Personal best: 74.08 m (1987)
Medal record
Women's athletics
Representing East Germany
Olympic Games
Silver medal – second place	1988 Seoul	Discus
World Championships
Silver medal – second place	1987 Rome	Discus
European Championships
Gold medal – first place	1986 Stuttgart	Discus
European Junior Championships
Gold medal – first place	1981 Utrecht	Discus

Diana Gansky (née Sachse; born 14 December 1963 in Bergen auf Rügen, Bezirk Rostock) is a German track and field athlete. She won an Olympic medal and was one of the world's best discus throwers. She represented East Germany and was the 1986 European champion (with her birth name Sachse). In 1987 and 1988 she was second in both the world championship and the Olympic games.

Gansky won the European Junior Championship as a 17-year-old in 1981, but she needed a few more years before she was able to compete with the already strong discus team of East Germany. She stood in the shadows of Martina Hellmann (who she only beat at the 1986 European championship). For a long time she trained with Gabriele Reinsch, the world record holder since July 1988 when she threw 76.80 meters. During her career Gansky reached 70 meters in 24 meetings, more than any other woman.

She represented ASK Vorwärts Potsdam and trained with Lothar Hillebrand. During her active career she was 1.84 meters tall and weighed 92 kilograms. She studied sports science, and at the time of German reunification she became a self-employed physiotherapist. Later she became active on the senior sports circuit and became the 2002 European Masters Champion (age 35–40). Gansky set her personal best (74.08 metres) on 20 June 1987 in Karl-Marx-Stadt; an East German record until 9 July 1988.

== International competitions ==
All results regarding Discus

Year	Competition	Venue	Position	Notes
Representing East Germany
1981	European Junior Championships	Utrecht, Netherlands	1st	57.30 m
1986	Goodwill Games	Moscow, Soviet Union	3rd	68.46 m
1986	European Championships	Stuttgart, West Germany	1st	71.36 m
1987	European Cup	Prague, Czechoslovakia	1st	73.90 m
1987	World Championships	Rome, Italy	2nd	70.12 m
1988	Olympic Games	Seoul, South Korea	2nd	71.88 m

Sporting positions
Preceded by Galina Savinkova	Women's discus Best Year Performance; 1986–1987	Succeeded by Gabriele Reinsch
