= Lee Sang-geun =

South Korean long-distance runner

Personal information
- Nationality: South Korean
- Born: 15 June 1962 (age 64)

Sport
- Sport: Long-distance running
- Event: 10,000 metres
Medal record
Men's athletics
Representing South Korea
Asian Championships
Silver medal – second place	1985 Jakarta	10,000 m
Bronze medal – third place	1985 Jakarta	5000 m
Bronze medal – third place	1987 Singapore	10,000 m

Lee Sang-geun (born 15 June 1962) is a South Korean long-distance runner. He competed in the men's 10,000 metres at the 1988 Summer Olympics.
