= Rajinder Kumar Vij =

Indian sports shooter (born 1939)

Personal information
- Nationality: Indian
- Born: 15 July 1939 (age 86)

Sport
- Sport: Sports shooting

Rajinder Kumar Vij (born 15 July 1939) is an Indian sports shooter. He competed in the men's 25 metre rapid fire pistol event at the 1984 Summer Olympics. He was also a bronze medalist at the 1982 Commonwealth Games. He was a lieutenant colonel in the Indian Armed Forces and was awarded the Vishisht Seva Medal.
