= Mariana Lengyel =

Romanian discus thrower

Personal information
- Born: 14 April 1953 (age 73) Bucharest, Romania

Sport
- Sport: Track and field
Medal record
Representing Romania
Summer Universiade
Bronze medal – third place	1981 Bucharest	Discus throw

Mariana Lengyel (née Ionescu; born 14 April 1953) is a Romanian female former track and field athlete who competed in the discus throw. She was a three-time national champion, winning from 1987 to 1989. She represented her country at the 1987 World Championships in Athletics, finishing in eighth place.

She was bronze medallist on home turf in Bucharest at the 1981 Summer Universiade. Her personal best 69.08 m (226 ft 7 1/2 in) was achieved in 1986 and ranked her fifth globally that year. As of 2018, she ranks in the all-time top 40 for the event.

== International competitions ==
Year	Competition	Venue	Position	Event	Notes
1981	Universiade	Bucharest, Romania	3rd	Discus throw	61.84 m
1987	World Championships	Rome, Italy	8th	Discus throw	62.30 m

== National titles ==
- Romanian Athletics Championships
  - Discus throw: 1987, 1988, 1989
