= Kim Chun-hui =

South Korean discus thrower

Personal information
- Nationality: South Korean
- Born: 14 July 1963 (age 63)

Sport
- Sport: Athletics
- Event: Discus throw

Kim Chun-hui (born 14 July 1963) is a South Korean athlete. She competed in the women's discus throw at the 1988 Summer Olympics.

At the Taiwan Open International Invitational Athletics Competition, Kim won a gold medal in the discus with a throw of 46.70 m.
