= Park Young-jun =

South Korean triple jumper

Personal information
- Nationality: South Korean
- Born: 29 March 1965 (age 61)

Sport
- Sport: Athletics
- Event: Triple jump
Medal record
Men's athletics
Representing South Korea
Asian Games
Silver medal – second place	1986 Seoul	Triple jump
Bronze medal – third place	1986 Seoul	Decathlon
Asian Championships
Gold medal – first place	1987 Singapore	Triple jump
Silver medal – second place	1985 Jakarta	Triple jump
Bronze medal – third place	1983 Kuwait City	Triple jump

Park Young-jun (born 29 March 1965) is a South Korean athlete. He competed in the men's triple jump at the 1984 Summer Olympics and the 1988 Summer Olympics.
