= 1987 Asian Athletics Championships =

1987 Asian Championships
- Dates: July 22-26
- Host city: Singapore, Singapore
- Venue: National Stadium
- Participation: at least 14 nations

The seventh Asian Championships in Athletics were held in July 1987 in Singapore.

== Medal summary ==
=== Men ===
Event	Gold		Silver		Bronze	
100 metres (wind: -1.0 m/s)	Talal Mansour; Qatar	10.41	Cheng Hsin-fu; Chinese Taipei	10.56	Li Tao; China	10.57
200 metres (wind: -1.3 m/s)	Talal Mansour; Qatar	20.71	Li Feng; China	21.12	Cheng Hsin-Fu; Chinese Taipei	21.21
400 metres	Mohammed Al-Malki; Oman	45.77	Mohamed Nordin Jadi; Malaysia	47.05	Yoshito Toshida; Japan	47.32
800 metres	Ismail Yousef; Qatar	1:47.81	Ryu Tae-Kyung; South Korea	1:48.00	Ramasamy Haridas; Malaysia	1:48.27
1500 metres	Duan Xiuquan; China	3:45.11	Shigeki Nakayama; Japan	3:45.41	Yutaka Hoshino; Japan	3:45.76
5000 metres	Ahmed Ibrahim Warsama; Qatar	14:09.29	Yoshiaki Iwasa; Japan	14:10.91	Cai Shangyan; China	14:11.30
10,000 metres	Cai Shangyan; China	29:47.85	Ahmed Ibrahim Warsama; Qatar	30:03.02	Lee Sang-Geun; South Korea	30:06.79
3000 metre steeplechase	Masashi Otokita; Japan	9:04.21	Ali Ahmed Saleh; Qatar	9:08.03	Kim Hyun-Hwa; South Korea	9:08.76
110 metres hurdles (wind: -1.1 m/s)	Yang Guang; China	14.04	Yu Zhicheng; China	14.06	Nagi Ghazi; Iraq	14.30
400 metres hurdles	Shigenori Ohmori; Japan	50.09	Jasem Al-Douwaila; Kuwait	50.46	Nasser Mohammed; Qatar	51.15
4 × 100 metres relay	Qatar; Jamal Abdallah Sulaiman; Faraj Marzouk; Saad Muftah; Talal Mansour	39.20	China; Cai Jianming; Li Feng; Li Tao; Zheng Chen	39.40	Chinese Taipei; Chang Yih-yuan; Cheng Hsin-fu; Lai Cheng-chuan; Lee Shin-long	39.68
4 × 400 metres relay	Japan; Yuji Yoshioka; Seiichi Ibe; Yoshito Toyota; Ritsuo Hayasaka	3:09.31	Malaysia; Joseph Phan; Ramasamy Haridas; Ismail Hashim; Mohamed Nordin Jadi	3:09.72	Chinese Taipei; Hsu Ruo-ta; Lee Shin-long; Lin Kuan-liang; Lin Tsai-tien	3:09.86
20 kilometre road walk	Liu Jianli; China	1:33:16	Jung Pil-Hwa; South Korea	1:37:49	Yoshihiro Oie; Japan	1:39:44
High jump	Liu Yunpeng; China	2.24	Cho Hyun-wook; South Korea	2.22	Ramjit Nairulal; Malaysia	2.10
Pole vault	Liang Xueren; China	5.35	Teruhisa Kamiya; Japan	5.15	Ku Chin-shui; Chinese Taipei	5.10
Long jump	Kim Won-jin; South Korea	8.00	Liu Yuhuang; China	7.98	Wang Shijie; China	7.91
Triple jump	Park Young-Jun; South Korea	16.37	Du Benzhong; China	16.37	Noboru Sasano; Japan	15.82
Shot put	Ma Yongfeng; China	18.32	Gong Yitian; China	18.05	Balwinder Singh; India	17.56
Discus throw	Li Weinan; China	56.10	Wang Daoming; China	54.48	Mansour Ghorbani; Iran	53.00
Hammer throw	Xie Yingqi; China	66.36	Akiyoshi Ikeda; Japan	65.98	Yu Guangming; China	65.74
Javelin throw	Takahiro Yamada; Japan	72.62	Frans Mahuse; Indonesia	72.30	Ji Zhanzheng; China	70.80
Decathlon	Gong Guohua; China	7848	Chen Zebin; China	7554	Lee Fu-an; Chinese Taipei	7515

=== Women ===
Event	Gold		Silver		Bronze	
100 metres (wind: -0.4 m/s)	Lydia de Vega; Philippines	11.43	P.T. Usha; India	11.74	Tian Yumei; China	11.76
200 metres (wind: -0.8 m/s)	Lydia de Vega; Philippines	23.38	Pan Weixin; China	24.06	Hiromi Isozaki; Japan	24.18
400 metres	P.T. Usha; India	52.31	Vandana Shanbagh; India	53.22	Xie Zhiling; China	54.16
800 metres	Choi Se-Bum; South Korea	2:05.11	Jiang Shuling; China	2:05.21	Lim Chun-Ae; South Korea	2:05.39
1500 metres	Yang Liuxia; China	4:19.29	Noe Hye-Soon; South Korea	4:23.52	Kim Ryon-Sun; North Korea	4:25.44
3000 metres	Kim Chun-Mae; North Korea	9:17.19	Zhang Xiuyun; China	9:17.61	Kim Ryon-Sun; North Korea	9:18.76
10,000 metres	Wang Huabi; China	34:56.34	Keiko Honma; Japan	35:31.04	Kim Gun-Hui; North Korea	37:04.12
100 metres hurdles (wind: -1.1 m/s)	Feng Yinghua; China	13.56	Chen Wen-Ying; Chinese Taipei	13.68	Wang Shu-Hwa; Chinese Taipei	14.05
400 metres hurdles	P.T. Usha; India	56.48	Chang Feng-Hua; Chinese Taipei	58.62	Hitomi Koshimoto; Japan	59.18
4 × 100 metres relay	China; Tian Yumei; Zhang Xiaoqiong; Pan Weixin; Shao Liwei	45.20	India; Vandana Shanbagh; Vandana Rao; Sany Joseph; P.T. Usha	45.49	Chinese Taipei; Chen Ya-li; Jen Yui-chu; Huang Kuei-ying; Chen Wen-ying	45.66
4 × 400 metres relay	India; Ashwini Nachappa; Vandana Rao; Sany Joseph; P.T. Usha	3:34.50	Japan; Fumiko Ono; Kimika Tateno; Mikako Eguchi; Hiromi Isozaki	3:39.70	Chinese Taipei; Chang Feng-hua; Chen Wen-ying; Hsu Yi-ling; Cheng Fei-ju	3:40.32
10000 metre track walk	An Limei; China	52:40.21	Yuki Nanbu; Japan	53:01.37	Park Hyun-Joo; South Korea	53:56.86
High jump	Ni Xiuling; China	1.92	Kim Hee-sun; South Korea	1.90	Ye Peisu; China	1.86
Long jump	Wang Zhihui; China	6.70	Liao Wenfen; China	6.51	Li Yong-Ae; North Korea	6.23
Shot put	Cong Yuzhen; China	18.17	Choi Mi-Sun; South Korea	13.88	Lee Jing-Hua; Chinese Taipei	13.33
Discus throw	Xing Ailan; China	58.08	Juliana Effendi; Indonesia	43.94	Li Sin-Gum; North Korea	43.86
Javelin throw	Li Baolian; China	60.12	Lee Huei-Cheng; Chinese Taipei	52.60	Naomi Tokuyama; Japan	50.14
Heptathlon	Dong Yuping; China	6036	Ma Miaolan; China	5460	Wang Shu-Hwa; Chinese Taipei	5293

== Medal table ==
Rank	Nation	Gold	Silver	Bronze	Total
1	China (CHN)	21	13	8	42
2	Qatar (QAT)	5	2	1	8
3	Japan (JPN)	4	7	7	18
4	South Korea (KOR)	3	6	4	13
5	India (IND)	3	3	1	7
6	Philippines (PHI)	2	0	0	2
7	North Korea (PRK)	1	0	5	6
8	Oman (OMN)	1	0	0	1
9	Chinese Taipei (TPE)	0	4	10	14
10	Malaysia (MAS)	0	2	2	4
11	Indonesia (INA)	0	2	0	2
12	Kuwait (KUW)	0	1	0	1
13	Iran (IRN)	0	0	1	1
13	Iraq (IRQ)	0	0	1	1
Totals (14 entries)		40	40	40	120

== See also ==
- 1987 in athletics (track and field)
