= Hou Xuemei =

Chinese discus thrower (born 1962)

Personal information
- Born: 27 February 1962 (age 64) Zhejiang, China

Sport
- Sport: Track and field
Medal record
Representing China
Asian Games
| Gold medal – first place | 1986 Seoul | Discus throw |
| Gold medal – first place | 1990 Beijing | Discus throw |
Summer Universiade
| Gold medal – first place | 1989 Duisburg | Discus throw |
| Bronze medal – third place | 1987 Zagreb | Discus throw |

Hou Xuemei (born 27 February 1962) is a retired Chinese discus thrower. Her personal best throw was 68.62 metres, achieved in September 1988 in Tianjin. The Chinese, and Asian, record is currently held by Xiao Yanling with 71.68 metres.

== Achievements ==
| Year | Competition | Venue | Position | Notes |
Representing China
| 1986 | Asian Games | Seoul, South Korea | 1st | 59.28 CR |
| 1987 | Summer Universiade | Zagreb, Yugoslavia | 3rd | |
| 1987 | World Championships | Rome, Italy | 14th | 58.26 m |
| 1988 | Olympic Games | Seoul, South Korea | 8th | Discus |
| 1989 | Summer Universiade | Duisburg, West Germany | 1st | |
| 1989 | World Cup | Barcelona, Spain | 2nd | |
| 1990 | Asian Games | Beijing, China | 1st | 63.56 CR |
