= Taranath Narayan Shenoy =

Indian swimmer

- Born: Maharashtra, India
- Occupation: Swimmer
- Years active: Since 1983
- Known for: Marathon swimming
- Awards: Padma Shri; International Marathon Swimming Hall of Fame; Triple Crown of Open Water Swimming; Arjuna Award; Shiv Chhatrapati Award; Van Audenaerde Special Award

Taranath Narayan Shenoy, is a deaf and visually impaired Indian swimmer and an honoree of the International Marathon Swimming Hall of Fame. He is a winner of the Triple Crown of Open Water Swimming, having successfully completed the English Channel, Catalina Channel and the Manhattan Island Marathon Swim. The Government of India awarded him the fourth highest civilian award of Padma Shri in 1990.

== Early life and career ==
Shenoy was born deaf and his vision was impaired to the level of legal blindness at birth. He took to swimming at an early age and attempted to swim across the English Channel at the age of 23 but was denied permission as he was underweight and had high blood pressure. He went back the next year and completed the task, followed by a swim across the Strait of Gibraltar, becoming the first deaf person to swim across the two open waters. He crossed the English Channel thrice, between 1983 and 1985, twice from England to France and once from France to England. In 1987, he crossed the Catalina Channel and accomplished the Manhattan Island, Marathon Swim, twice, in 1987 and 1989. He has so far covered 4 of the Oceans Seven channels and has swum across the Palk Strait, Suez Canal and Nile River, Manhattan Island, Catalina Channel and Atlantic Ocean, the Strait of Gibraltar, the Strait of Dardanelles and the Cook Strait. He works as a swimming coach and an organizer of the National Deaf Swimming Championships while coaching his son, Ankul Shenoy, who is an aspiring swimmer.

== Awards and honours ==
Shenoy won the Triple Crown of Open Water Swimming from the World Open Water Swimming Association when he completed his efforts across the English Channel, Catalina Channel, and the Manhattan Island. He received the Shiv Chhatrapati Award from the Government of Maharashtra in 1983. In 1987, he was inducted into the International Marathon Swimming Hall of Fame. The Government of India honoured him with the Arjuna Award the same year, and followed it up by including him in the Republic Day honours list for the civilian award of the Padma Shri in 1990. He is also a recipient of the Van Audenaerde Special Award from the English Channel Swimming Association.

== See also ==
- Mihir Sen
