= Chang Feng-hua =

Taiwanese sprinter

Personal information
- Nationality: Taiwanese
- Born: 張 芬華, Pinyin: Zhāng Fēn-huá; 11 April 1968 (age 58)

Sport
- Sport: Sprinting
- Event: 400 metres
Medal record
Women's athletics
Representing Chinese Taipei
Asian Championships
| Silver medal – second place | 1987 Singapore | 400 m hurdles |
| Bronze medal – third place | 1987 Singapore | 4×400 m |

Chang Feng-hua (born 11 April 1968) is a Taiwanese sprinter. She competed in the women's 400 metres at the 1988 Summer Olympics.
