= List of people from Vellore =

The following people were born or based their life in Vellore.

== Education ==
- G. Viswanathan, founder and chancellor, VIT University
- V. L. Ethiraj, founder, Ethiraj College for Women
- V. M. Muralidharan, chairman, Ethiraj College for Women
- Benjamin Pulimood, director/principal, Christian Medical College & Hospital

== Entrepreneurs ==
- Mecca Rafeeque Ahmed, founder and managing director of FARIDA Group
- V. Natarajan, Chairman of KMV Group

== Film and entertainment ==
- Radhika Apte, Bollywood actress
- Aryan, Indian film actor
- Bhaskar (director)|Bhaskar]], director of Bommarilu, Paragu, Orange, [[Ongole Githa, [Bangalore Naatkal]]
- Vani Jairam, playback singer
- R. Nataraja Mudaliar, known as the father of Tamil cinema, a pioneer in the production of silent films
- Dinesh Ravi, Tamil actor of Attakathi and Visaranai fame
- Nelson Dilipkumar, Director of Kolamaavu Kokila, Doctor, Beast, Jailer (2023 Tamil film)|Jailer]].
- Poornima Ravi, Tamil film actress
- Indhuja Ravichandran, Tamil film actress
- V. Ravichandran (film producer)|V. Ravichandran]], Indian film producer and distributor
- Aravinnd Singh, cinematographer of Tamil films Demonte Colony and Diary
- Thiru (director)|Thiru]], Tamil film director
- Vishnu Vishal, Tamil actor
- N. Viswanathan, Bengali actor

== Politics ==
- C. Gnanasekaran, Indian politician and former Member of the Legislative Assembly of Tamil Nadu
- C. Abdul Hakim, Indian politician and businessman
- Durai Murugan, Indian politician and Ex-Minister for Public Works, Govt. of Tamil Nadu
- Abdul Rahman (Vellore politician)|Abdul Rahman]], Indian politician and former member of the Parliament of India from Vellore (Lok Sabha constituency)|Vellore Constituency]]
- V. S. Vijay, Indian politician and incumbent member of the Tamil Nadu legislative assembly from Vellore constituency and Ex-Minister for Health, Govt. of Tamil Nadu

== Sports ==
- Palani Amarnath, former player of IPL Chennai Superkings and Tamil Nadu Ranji Trophy
- M Tamil Selvan, won silver medal in 1978 & 1982 Commonwealth Games
- Sathish Sivalingam, won gold medal in 77 kg category in 2014 & 2018 Commonwealth Games

== Scientists ==
- C. Mohan, well known computer scientist in Silicon Valley, an IBM Fellow and the former IBM India Chief Scientist

== Writers ==
- Azhagiya Periyavan (pen name of C.Aravindan), journalist and author
