= Raj Kumar (athlete) =

Indian track and field athlete

Raj Kumar Ahlawat
Personal information
- Nationality: Indian
- Born: Manoharpura, Distt- Jhunjhunu (Rajasthan) India
- Spouse: surjo Devi

Sport
- Country: India
- Sport: Track and Field
Medal record
Men's athletics
Representing India
Asian Games
Bronze medal – third place	1982 Delhi	5000 m
Asian Championships
Silver medal – second place	1983 Kuwait City	5000 m

Raj Kumar (born 2 March 1962 in Manoharpura Distt- Jhunjhunu Rajasthan state) is a former Indian track and field athlete. He won the bronze medal in 5000 meters in 1982 Asian Games and the silver medal in the event at the 1983 Asian Championships in Athletics. He is a former national record holder in 5000 meters with a time of 13.46.4 minutes.

He was awarded Arjuna Award in 1984.
