= Mohinder Lal (sport shooter) =

Indian sports shooter (1947–2019)

Personal information
- Nationality: Indian
- Born: 24 February 1947
- Died: 23 March 2019 (aged 72)

Sport
- Sport: Sports shooting

Mohinder Lal (24 February 1947 – 23 March 2019) was an Indian sports shooter. He competed in the men's 25 metre rapid fire pistol event at the 1984 Summer Olympics.
