= Khajan Singh =

Indian swimmer (born 1964)

Khajan Singh Tokas
Personal information
- Full name: Khajan Singh Tokas
- National team: India
- Born: 6 May 1964 (age 62) Munirka Village, South West Delhi, India

Sport
- Sport: Swimming
- Strokes: Freestyle, Butterfly
Medal record
Men's swimming
Representing India
Asian Games
Silver medal – second place	1986 Seoul	200m Butterfly

Khajan Singh (also Khajan Singh Tokas) (born 6 May 1964) is an Indian swimmer, who remained national swimming champion of India, and won a silver medal at the 1986 Asian Games in Seoul. He was awarded an Arjuna Award by Government of India in 1984.

== Early life and education ==
Born on 6 May 1964 in Munirka village, Khajan went to study at the Government Senior Secondary School, Sarojini Nagar, in Delhi.

== Career ==
He made his debut in competitive swimming by winning five Gold Medals at the National School Championships in 1981-82. Six-Footer Khajana entered the National Aquatics Championship at Delhi in 1982 and outclassed all competitors by winning five Gold, two Silver and one Bronze. The following year at the Nationals in Trivandrum, he stroked his way to seven Gold, two Silver and one Bronze.

Again in the National Aquatic Championship at Ahmedabad in 1987, he not only won seven Gold Medals but also created a national record in the 100 metres freestyle with a timing of 55.21 seconds, breaking his own record of 55.34 seconds set in the 1984 South Asian Games at Kathmandu. He was the undisputed king at the 1988 Nationals at Calcutta making an unprecedented haul of eight individual Gold, five of them gleaming with the additional lustre of new records. He also contributed to a Silver and a Bronze for the police relay team. The ace swimmer, master free style and Arjuna Awardee of 1984, Khajan scored Silver at the 1986 Asian Games in Seoul in 200m Butterfly. That was the first time since 1951 that India won a medal at the Asiad. The next medal in swimming came 24 years later, when Virdhawal Khade won a bronze in the same event at 2010 Asian Games.

His most outstanding international performance was at the South Asian Federation Games (now known South Asian Games), where he won Gold Medals at Kathmandu in 1984 and seven at 2004 South Asian Games at Islamabad in 1989. He won a Bronze at the 1988 Asian Swimming Championships in Beijing and a Silver in the 100 metre butterfly at the world Police Games in 1988.

Khajan represented India in the 12th Commonwealth Games at Brisbane in 1982, IXth Asian Games at Delhi in 1982, 2nd Asian Swimming Championship at Seoul in 1984, friendly International Game at Moscow in 1984. Coached by Australian coach Eric Arnold, Khajan Singh even took part in the 1988 Olympic at Seoul.

He started as a sports officer in his early career and he was at the D.I.G. position with the Central Reserve Police Force (CRPF) in 2024 when reports came out that he may be dismissed from service on grounds of sexual harassment.

== Personal life ==
He runs the "Khajan Singh Swimming Academy", located near the Jawaharlal Nehru University (JNU) campus in New Delhi.

In 2010, he along with leading sport persons of the past took part in the Ministry of Youth Affairs and Sports tableau on Commonwealth Games – Delhi 2010, at the 61st Republic Day parade in New Delhi.
