= Ottathai =

Village in Kannur district, Kerala, India

Ottathai is a small village located in Kannur district in the South Indian state of Kerala. Ottathai is 4 km from Alakode and 4 km from Kappimala.
