= Mihir Sen =

Indian swimmer

- Born: 16 November 1930; Purulia, Manbhum, Bengal Presidency, British India
- Died: 11 June 1997 (aged 66); Calcutta, West Bengal, India
- Occupation(s): Barrister, Businessman
- Spouse: Bella Weingarten Sen
- Children: Supriya Sen, Chandra Sen, Debika Sen and Sumantha Sen
- Awards: Padma Shri in 1959; Padma Bhushan in 1967; Blitz Nehru Trophy in 1967

Mihir Sen (16 November 1930 – 11 June 1997) was a famous Indian long distance swimmer and lawyer. He was the first Asian to conquer the English Channel from Dover to Calais in 1958, and did so in the fastest time (14 hrs & 45 mins). He was the only man to swim the oceans of the five continents in one calendar year (1966). These included the Palk Strait, Dardanelles, Bosphorus, Gibraltar, and the entire length of the Panama Canal. This unique achievement earned him a place in The Guinness Book of Records as the "world's greatest long distance swimmer".

== Early life ==
Mihir Sen was born in a Baidya-Brahmin family on 16 November 1930 in Purulia, West Bengal, to physician Ramesh Sengupta and his wife, Lilabati. Largely due to the efforts of his mother Lilabati, the Sens moved to Cuttack when Mihir was eight, as Cuttack had better schools.

Mihir graduated with a degree in law from Utkal University in Bhubaneswar in Odisha. He wanted to travel to England to prepare himself for the bar but was constrained by a lack of funds. However, with the financial help of then Chief Minister of Orissa, Biju Patnaik in 1950 he was able to board a ship to England to pursue his studies.

== Life in England ==
In England, Sen was hired at India House by the Indian Ambassador Krishna Menon. He enrolled at Lincoln's Inn to study Law on 21 February 1951. He self-studied from the books he borrowed from their library. He was called to the Bar at Lincoln's Inn on 23 November 1954.

== Swimming career ==
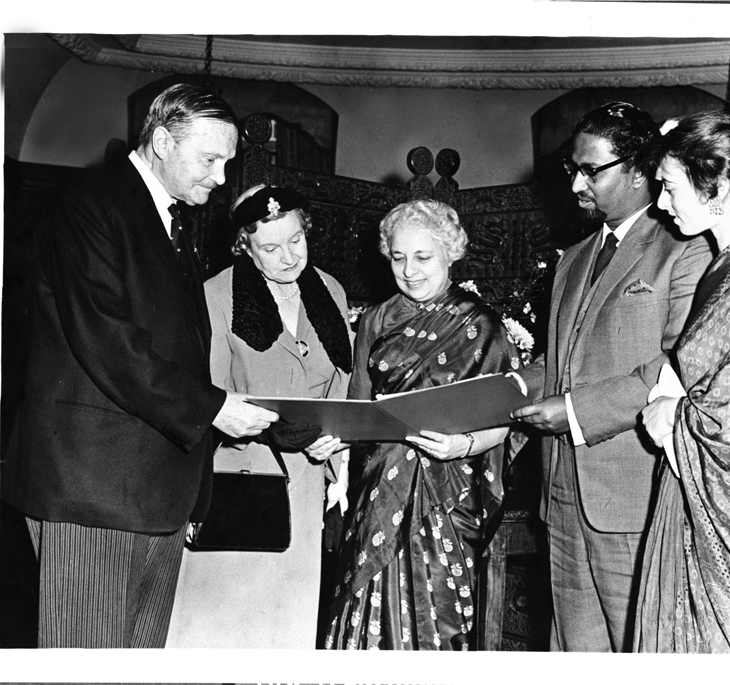
Sen being presented a certificate by Lord Freyberg on behalf of the Counsel Swimming Association at a function held at the India House, London

Sen read an article in a local newspaper about Florence Chadwick, the first American woman to swim the English Channel in 1950, and was inspired to repeat this feat for his country. At this time, he had hardly any experience in swimming, so sought lessons in at the local YMCA until he mastered the front crawl (UK / freestyle US) technique.

On 27 September 1958, he catapulted to fame after conquering the English Channel from Dover to Calais in the fourth fastest time (14 hours and 45 minutes). He returned to India a National Hero and was considered to be one of the most prominent youth icons of his generation. In 1959, he was awarded the Padma Shri by Prime Minister Jawaharlal Nehru.

He then set out to become the first man to swim the oceans of the five continents in one calendar year (1966). Initially, he needed to raise Rs 45,000 to pay the Indian navy to record and navigate the Palk Strait swim. Sen raised half the money through sponsors (notably the Kolkata daily, The Statesman) and the balance was provided by then Prime Minister Indira Gandhi. She further extended full support of the Indian Navy (The INS Sukanya and the INS Sharada) to accompany him for the Palk Strait swim. Sen became the first Indian on record to swim across the Palk Straits on 5–6 April 1966 between Ceylon (Sri Lanka) and Dhanushkodi (India) in 25 hours and 36 minutes. On 24 August, he became the first Asian to cross the Straits of Gibraltar in 8 hours and 1 minute, and on 12 September became the world's first man to swim across the 40-mile long Dardanelles (Gallipoli, Europe to Sedulbahir, Asia minor) in 13 hours and 55 minutes. In the same year, Sen was also the first Indian to swim the Bosphorus (Turkey) in 4 hrs and the first non-American (and third man) to swim across the entire (50-mile length) of the Panama Canal in 34 hrs and 15 mins on 29–31 October.

This achievement earned him a place in the Guinness Book of World Records for long distance swimming and he was awarded the Padma Bhushan in 1967 by Prime Minister Indira Gandhi. In the same year, he also won the Blitz Nehru Trophy for 'daring achievements in the seven seas of the world.'

== Life in India ==
After his return to India in 1958 (shortly after his English Channel victory), he was denied entry into the clubs due to their "whites only" policy. This compelled him to lead a high-profile media campaign to abolish this rule, and, as a result, clubs throughout India were forced to open their doors to all Indians. He initially practised Criminal Law at the Calcutta High Court, but subsequently became a successful businessman.

In 1977, the Communist leader Jyoti Basu requested him to join and campaign for the Communist Party of India (Marxist) in return for a high-profile government post, which Sen refused. With the CPI(M) victory, Basu attacked Sen's business and steadily undermined its functioning until it was forced to shut down permanently.

== Death ==
Sen died from a combination of Alzheimer's and Parkinson's disease at age 66 in June 1997.
