= Bhagirath Samai =

Indian sport shooter

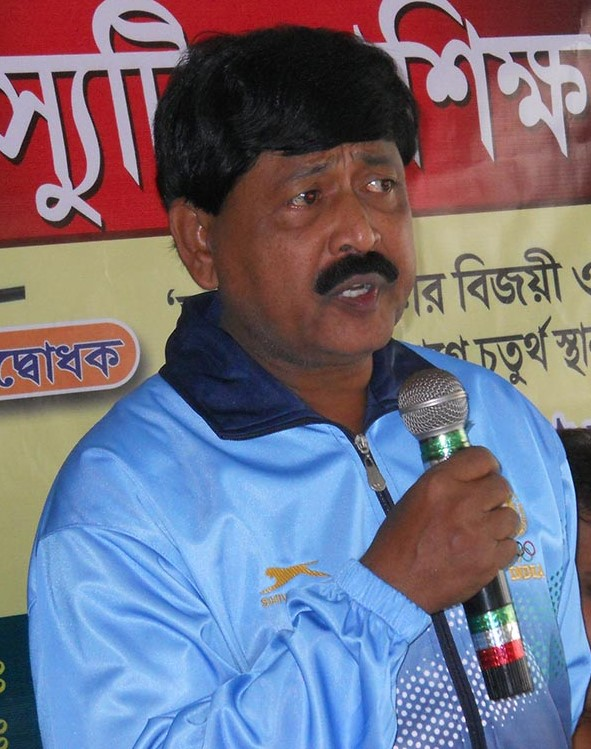

Personal information
- Nationality: Indian
- Citizenship: Indian
- Born: 11 August 1957 (age 68) Asansol, West Bengal, India
- Height: 170 cm (5 ft 7 in) (As of August 2017)
- Weight: 64 kg (141 lb) (As of August 2017)
- Spouse: Rina Samai
- Website: bhagirathsamai.wordpress.com

Sport
- Sport: Shooting

Bhagirath Samai (born 11 August 1957), is an Indian professional shooter who represented his country at the 1984 Summer Olympics. He won a gold medal at the 1986 Asian Games, for which performance he was awarded the Arjuna Award. He participated in two South Asian Games, two Asian Games, two Asian Shooting Championships, two Commonwealth Games and one Olympic Games.

== Career ==
Events	Games	Name	Rating	Rank
1982 Commonwealth Games	Air rifle	Bhagirath samai	----	-----
1982 Asian Games	SMALL BORE STD R. 3 PSN	BHAGIRATH SAMAI AMITABH CHATTERJEE   SOMA DUTTA   P.K. CHATTERJEE  TEAM	561 549   546   541   2197	12 20  22  26  5
1982 Asian Games	Air rifle	Bhagirath Samai S.K. ROY CHAUDHARY   SOMA DUTTA   RAMESH KUSALE  team	552 552   544   533   2181	23 23  26  28  7
1982 Asian Games	SMALL BORE F.R. 3 PSN.	BHAGIRATH SAMAI J. DASS    P.K. CHATTERJEE    I.C.CHITTIAPPA    TEAM	1100 1098  1069  4328	20 25  29  7
Asian Shooting Championships	SMALL BORE FREE RIFLE PRONE	BHAGIRATH SAMAI	585	9th
1984 Summer Olympics	Free Rifle Prone	Bhagirath Samai	583	45
1984 Summer Olympics	Air Rifle (M)	Bhagirath Samai	56	39
1986 Asian Games	A.R.(1) M	Bhagirath Samai	562 554   540   1656	12 15  23  6th
1986 Asian Games	S.B. RIFLE PRONE	R.S. PERHAR BHAGIRATH SAMAI                                                   R.V.NATHAN                                                     TEAM	591 591  583  1765	11 12  23  4th
1986 Asian Games	FREE RIFLE 3 POSITION (1)	BHAGIRATH SAMAI J. DAS                              YADAV                               TEAM	1127 1125   1099   3351	9 11   20   5
1986 Asian Games	SMALL BORE STD RIFLE 3 POSITION (M)	BHAGIRATH SAMAI J. DAS                                                            GHISALAL YADAV                             TEAM BRONZE	573 572  557  1702	7 8  13  3
1987 Asian Shooting Championships	FREE RIFLE 3 POSITION (M)	BHAGIRATH SAMAI	1120	14
1990 Commonwealth Games	AIR RIF RIFLE	BHAGIRATH SAMAI SOMA DUTTA                               TEAM BRONZE	558 576  1148	15 4  3
1991 South Asian Games	FREE RIFLE 3P (M)	T.C.PALLANGAPPA BHAGIRATH SAMAI                            RAJ KUMAR (ARMY)                            TEAM GOLD	1124 1118  1107  3349	Gold Silver   Bronze
1993 South Asian Games	FREE RIFLE PRONE	BHAGIRATH SAMAI HANUMANA RAM                                    K.S. KAUNDAL                                 TEAM	580 585  576  1741	n/a bronze  n/a  bronze
1993 VI SAF GAMES, DHAKA	FREE RIFLE 3 POSITION	BHAGIRATH SAMAI HANUMANA RAM      K.S. KAUNDAL   TEAM	580 585  576  1741	n/a bronze  n/a  bronze

=== Notable international performance ===
Rank	Year	Event
02	1991	1991 South Asian Games
07	1986	1986 Asian Games
09	1986	1986 Asian Games
09	1983	Asian Shooting Championships
11	1986	1986 Asian Games
12	1982	1982 Asian Games
14	1987	Asian Shooting Championships
15	1990	1990 Commonwealth Games
15	1986	1986 Asian Games
20	1982	1986 Asian Games
23	1986	1982 Asian Games
39	1984	1984 Summer Olympics
45	1984	1984 Summer Olympics

== Awards and recognition ==
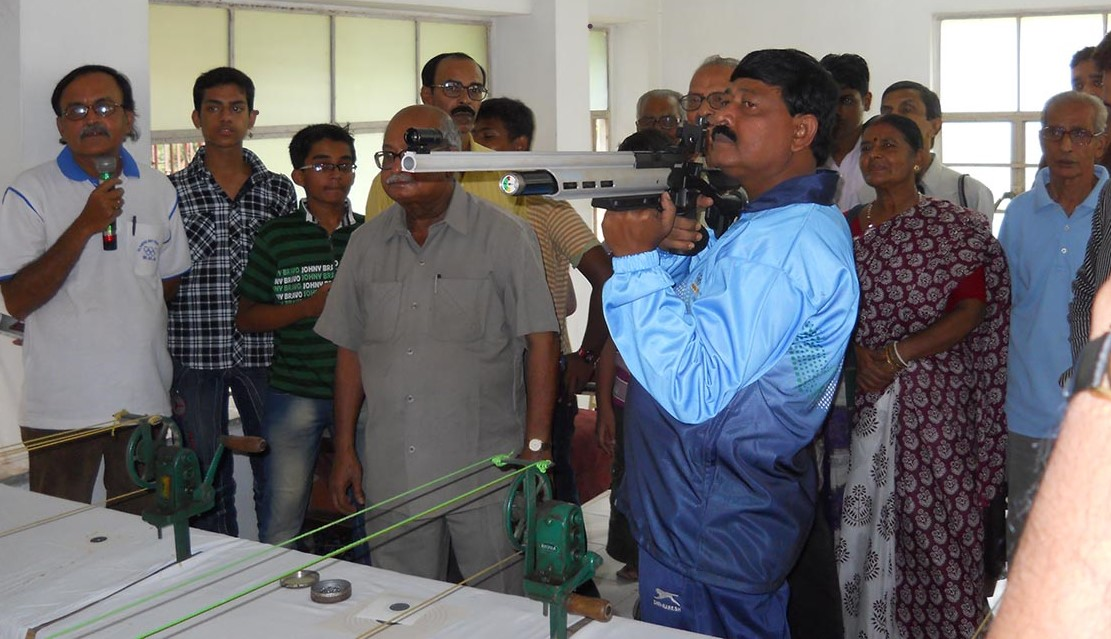
- Bhagirath Samai in Action

He was awarded the Arjuna Award in Shooting in 1986 for winning a Bronze Medal in the 1986 Asian Games

- He receives a life time Pension worth 6000 /- INR per month from the Ministry of Youth Affairs and Sports for his performance in international events.
- Midnapore rifle club gave him the title 'King of the Rifle of India'.

== Personal life ==
Bhagirath Samai was born in Asansol and is the youngest of his brothers. He said that he took shooting to reluctantly, but later fell in love with the sport. He married Rina Samai in 1992.

He currently does service for a construction company in Haldia, living away from family.
