= Mehar Chand Bhaskar =

Indian weightlifter

Mehar Chand Bhaskar is a former Indian national weight lifter. He has been awarded the Arjuna Award. He hails from Rajasthan and served in the Indian Army. He belongs to Gadakhera village of Buhana Tehsil in Jhunjhunu.
