= Cai Jianming =

Chinese sprinter (born 1963)

Personal information
- Native name: 蔡建明
- Nationality: Chinese
- Born: 1 August 1963 (age 62)

Sport
- Sport: Sprinting
- Event: 100 metres
Medal record
Men's athletics
Representing China
Asian Championships
Gold medal – first place	1983 Kuwait City	4×100 m
Gold medal – first place	1985 Jakarta	4×100 m
Gold medal – first place	1989 New Delhi	4×100 m
Silver medal – second place	1987 Singapore	4×100 m
Bronze medal – third place	1989 New Delhi	200 m

Cai Jianming (Chinese: 蔡建明; born 1 August 1963) is a Chinese sprinter. He competed in the men's 100 metres at the 1988 Summer Olympics.
