= Kim Won-jin (athlete) =

South Korean long jumper

Personal information
- Born: 1 December 1968 (age 57)

Sport
- Sport: Track and field
Medal record
Representing South Korea
Asian Championships
Gold medal – first place	1987 Singapore	Long jump
Bronze medal – third place	1989 New Delhi	Long jump

Kim Won-jin (김원진, born 1 December 1968) is a South Korean long jumper.

He won the gold medal at the 1987 Asian Championships and the bronze medal at the 1989 Asian Championships.

His personal best jump is 8.03 metres, achieved in June 1987 in Seoul. This is the current South Korean record.
