= Vandana Shanbagh =

Indian sprinter

Vandana Shanbhag
Personal information
- Full name: Vandana Pandurang Shanbagh
- National team: India
- Born: 19 September 1963 (age 62)

Sport
- Sport: Track and Field athlete
Medal record
Women's athletics
Representing India
Asian Championships
Silver medal – second place	1987 Singapore	400 m
Silver medal – second place	1987 Singapore	4×100 m

Vandana Pandurang Shanbhag (born 19 September 1965) is a female Indian former track and field athlete who represented India at the 1988 Olympics in the 4 x 400 metres relay race. She is also a Kho-kho player. She won the silver medal in the women's 400 metres race at the 1987 Asian Athletics Championships held in Singapore. She was honoured with the Arjuna Award for outstanding achievement in Indian sports.

She is married, has a daughter and is settled in Mangalore.
