= Anita Sood =

Indian swimmer (born 1966)

Personal information
- Born: January 18, 1966 (age 60)

Sport
- Sport: Swimming

Anita Sood-Mankar (born January 18, 1966) is a former national woman swimming champion of India. She became the fastest Asian swimmer to cross the English Channel with a time of 8 hours and 15 minutes on August 17, 1987, becoming the 333rd person to swim the channel. She was awarded Arjuna Award for her achievements. She is coached by Sandeep Digvikar.

== Achievements ==
Swimming since 1975, Anita first climbed to fame at the Trivandrum national age group meet in 1977, where she won nine medals - four golds, four silvers and a bronze - while participating in the under-13 category. A year later she bagged six titles in the Maharashtra state meet in Bombay and firmly established herself as a new phenomenon by bettering two records and beating long-reigning senior national champion Smita Desai to win the 100-metres freestyle.

== Personal life ==
Anita is from Maharashtra.

She is married to Abhijeet Mankar, resides in Los Angeles CA, and has 2 children.
