= A. Radhika Suresh =

Indian table tennis player

Personal information
- Full name: Ambika Radhika Suresh
- Nationality: India

Sport
- Sport: Table tennis
Medal record
Women's table tennis
Representing India
Commonwealth Championships
Silver medal – second place	1991 Nairobi	Team
SAF Games
Gold medal – first place	1991 Colombo	Singles
Gold medal – first place	1991 Colombo	Doubles
Gold medal – first place	1991 Colombo	Team
Gold medal – first place	1991 Dhaka	Singles
Gold medal – first place	1991 Dhaka	Doubles
Gold medal – first place	1991 Dhaka	Team

A. Radhika Suresh is a table tennis player from Kerala, India. She is an Olympian and former national champion.

== Family ==
She belongs to a family of table tennis players. Her father K.R. Pillai was a former Tamil Nadu and Kerala state champion and her elder brother, R. Rajesh too is a former state champion.

== Achievements ==
Following are her achievements.

=== State ===
- At the age of 10 she won the Kerala State sub-junior title.

=== National ===
- Won national sub-junior title at Muzaffarpur in 1986
- Won national junior's title at Indore in 1989
- Won national women's title at Pondicherry in 1995
- Women's singles titles in the 22nd National veterans table tennis championship at the Rajiv Gandhi indoor stadium at Kochi in 2015

=== International ===
- World championships in 1991, 1993 and 1995
- Commonwealth championships in 1991, 1993 and 1995
- Asian Table Tennis Championships in 1990, 1992 and 1994
- 1996 Atlanta Olympics table tennis event
- was part of the silver medal-winning Indian squad in the team event at the 1991 Nairobi Commonwealth Table Tennis Championships, .
- won all three gold medals, winning the singles, doubles and team events, at the 1991 Colombo and the 1993 Dhaka South Asian Federation Games.

== Personal life ==
She is employed at Indian Oil Corporation as Customer Services Executive. She also runs an academy at the Kadavanthra YMCA.
