= 1985 Asian Athletics Championships =

1985 Asian Championships
- Dates: 25–29 September
- Host city: Jakarta, Indonesia
- Venue: Senayan Madya Stadium
- Participation: at least 16 nations

The sixth Asian Championships in Athletics were held in September 1985 at the Senayan Madya Stadium in Jakarta, Indonesia.

== Medal summary ==
=== Men ===
Event	Gold		Silver		Bronze	
100 metres (wind: +0.8 m/s)	Zheng Chen; China	10.28	Mohammed Purnomo; Indonesia	10.33	Jang Jae-keun; South Korea	10.35
200 metres (wind: +1.5 m/s)	Jang Jae-keun; South Korea	20.57	Mohammed Purnomo; Indonesia	21.19	Li Feng; China	21.20
400 metres	Isidro del Prado; Philippines	45.61	Mohammed Al-Malki; Oman	46.45	Aouf Abdulrahman Yousef; Iraq	46.67
800 metres	Batumalai Rajakumar; Malaysia	1:47.37 NR	Charles Borromeo; India	1:47.99	Ryu Tae-kyung; South Korea	1:48.18
1500 metres	Bagicha Singh; India	3:56.85	Suresh Yadav; India	3:56.90	Hussein Darwish; Iraq	3:57.07
5000 metres	Kozu Akutsu; Japan	14:22.11	Haruo Urata; Japan	14:22.42	Lee Sang-geun; South Korea	14:23.02
10,000 metres	Zhang Guowei; China	29:58.73	Lee Sang-geun; South Korea	30:10.05	Vinod Kumar Pokhriyal; India	32:09.62
Marathon	Ling Jong-hyen; North Korea	2:20:29	Tomio Sueyoshi; Japan	2:24:26	Choe Il-sop; North Korea	2:24:52
3000 metre steeplechase	Shigeyuki Aikyo; Japan	8:46.96	Hwang Wen-cheng; Chinese Taipei	8:47.53	Shanmugin Pitchaiah; India	8:48.14
110 metres hurdles (wind: +0.4 m/s)	Yu Zhicheng; China	13.94	Masahiko Sugi; Japan	14.20	Li Jieqiang; China	14.23
400 metres hurdles	Ahmed Hamada Jassim; Bahrain	49.88	Jasem Al-Douwaila; Kuwait	50.81	Hiroshi Kakimori; Japan	50.85
4 × 100 metres relay	China; Cai Jianming; Yu Zhuanghui; Li Tao; Zheng Chen	39.34	Qatar; Saad Muftah Mubarak Al-Kuwari; Jamal Abdallah Sulaiman; Faraj Marzouk; Talal Mansour	39.81	South Korea; Jang Jae-keun; Kim Bok-Seop; Shim Duk-sup; Sung Nak-kun	39.85
4 × 400 metres relay	Iraq; Fahim Abdul-Sada; Aouf Abdulrahman Yousef; Abbas Ali Lafta; Heitham Nadim	3:07.68	Japan; Takeo Suzuki; Hiromitsu Suzuki; Kenji Yamauchi; Sen-ya Suzuki	3:07.92	Philippines; Isidro Del Prado; Romeo Gido; Honesto Larce; Leopoldo Arnillo	3:09.95
20 kilometre road walk	Liu Jianli; China	1:26:52	Chand Ram; India	1:27:20	Wang Zhicheng; China	1:31:12
High jump	Shuji Ujino; Japan	2.24	Takao Sakamoto; Japan	2.22	Liu Yunpeng; China	2.22
Pole vault	Ji Zebiao; China	5.30	Toshiyuki Hashioka; Japan	5.20	Liang Xueren; China	5.10
Long jump	Liu Yuhuang; China	8.00	Pang Yan; China	7.95	Junichi Usui; Japan	7.72
Triple jump	Tian Hongxin; China	16.38	Park Young-jun; South Korea	16.35	Yasushi Ueta; Japan	15.96
Shot put	Balwinder Singh; India	17.88	Gong Yitian; China	17.80	Bahadur Singh Chouhan; India	17.21
Discus throw	Li Weinan; China	55.30	Wang Daoming; China	54.62	Kuldip Singh; India	52.36
Hammer throw	Raghubir Singh Bal; India	64.34	Xie Yingqi; China	63.44	Waleed Al-Bekheet; Kuwait	60.62
Javelin throw	Pubu Ciren; China	76.56	Kim Sun-yun; South Korea	76.22	Kazuhiro Mizoguchi; Japan	74.90
Decathlon	Ku Chin-shui; Chinese Taipei	7538	Lee Fu-an; Chinese Taipei	7469	Wang Kangqiang; China	7357

=== Women ===
Event	Gold		Silver		Bronze	
100 metres (wind: -2.0 m/s)	P.T. Usha; India	11.64	Ratjai Sripet; Thailand	11.95	Lydia de Vega; Philippines	11.96
200 metres (wind: +3.4 m/s)	P.T. Usha; India	23.05w	Reawadee Srithoa; Thailand	23.70w	Vandana Rao; India	23.79w
400 metres	P.T. Usha; India	52.62	Shiny Abraham; India	53.32	Emma Tahapari; Indonesia	55.08
800 metres	Shiny Abraham; India	2:03.16	Sasithorn Chantanuhong; Thailand	2:03.46 (NR)	Yang Liuxia; China	2:05.07
1500 metres	Yang Liuxia; China	4:19.11	Choi Ok-soon; North Korea	4:21.62	Choi Jong-hui; North Korea	4:26.35
3000 metres	Kim Lyong-soon; North Korea	9:27.75	Li Xiuxia; China	9:29.88	Suman Rawat; India	9:36.97
10,000 metres	Paek Do-jong; North Korea	35:17.35	Wang Huabi; China	35:35.77	Kim Myong-hui; North Korea	35:49.33
Marathon	Asha Aggarwal; India	2:48:53	Yuko Gordon; Hong Kong	2:54:16	Ki Sun-bok; North Korea	2:57:28
100 metres hurdles (wind: +1.0 m/s)	Liu Huajin; China	13.22	Chen Kemei; China	13.48	Chen Wen-ying; Chinese Taipei	13.59
400 metres hurdles	P.T. Usha; India	56.64	M. D. Valsamma; India	57.81	Agrifina de la Cruz; Philippines	59.59
4 × 100 metres relay	Thailand; Reawadee Srithoa; Ratjai Sripet; Walapa Tangjitsusorn; Jaree Patarach	45.07	China; Liu Huajin; Tian Yumei; Zhang Jiangmei; Pan Weixin	45.20	India; M. D. Valsamma; Ashwini Nachappa; Vandana Rao; P.T. Usha	45.22
4 × 400 metres relay	India; Vandana Rao; Ashwini Nachappa; Shiny Abraham; P.T. Usha	3:34.10	Japan; Hitomi Koshimoto; Hiromi Isozaki; Takako Kitamura; Yoko Sato	3:39.51	Chinese Taipei; Shen Su-feng; Hsu Yi-ling; Cheng Fei-ju; Lai Lee-jiao	3:39.88 (NR)
10,000 metre track walk	Rian Bingyie; China	50:38.81	Xiong Yan; China	51:04.66	Iece Magdalena Siregar; Indonesia	53:55.46
High jump	Yang Wenqin; China	1.90	Ni Xiuling; China	1.90	Wu Wei-chun; Chinese Taipei	1.81
Long jump	Huang Donghuo; China	6.60	Liao Wenfen; China	6.57	Kim Mi-sook; South Korea	6.25
Shot put	Cong Yuzhen; China	18.36	Li Meisu; China	17.64	Han Yun-sook; South Korea	14.12
Discus throw	Li Xiaohui; China	58.38	Yu Hourun; China	51.44	Ikuko Kitamori; Japan	50.48
Javelin throw	Zhu Hongyang; China	56.84	Wang Jin; China	53.44	Emi Matsui; Japan	53.28
Heptathlon	Ye Lianying; China	5319	Dong Yuping; China	5198	Tung Fung-gao; Chinese Taipei	5117

== Medal table ==
* Host nation (Host nation)

Rank	Nation	Gold	Silver	Bronze	Total
1	China (CHN)	19	15	7	41
2	India (IND)	10	5	7	22
3	Japan (JPN)	3	7	6	16
4	North Korea (PRK)	3	1	4	8
5	South Korea (KOR)	1	3	6	10
6	Thailand (THA)	1	3	0	4
7	Chinese Taipei (TPE)	1	2	4	7
8	Philippines (PHI)	1	0	3	4
9	Iraq (IRQ)	1	0	2	3
10	Bahrain (BHR)	1	0	0	1
10	Malaysia (MAS)	1	0	0	1
12	Indonesia (INA)*	0	2	2	4
13	Kuwait (KUW)	0	1	1	2
14	Hong Kong (HKG)	0	1	0	1
14	Oman (OMN)	0	1	0	1
14	Qatar (QAT)	0	1	0	1
Totals (16 entries)		42	42	42	126

== See also ==
- 1985 in athletics (track and field)
