= Manjima Kuriakose =

Manjima Kuriakose (born 29 October 1976) is a 400 metres runner from Wayanad, Kerala. She was named as a part of the Indian 4x400 m women relay team at the 2000 Sydney Olympics, Apart from that, she was also named to the Indian team. Her fellow athlete Aloysious has alleged that Manjima was a victim of discriminations in terms of opportunities where athletes from North India were giving priorities and that Manjima was sidelined for the (women's) 400 metres at the Asian Games. Manjima later became the Deputy Commandant in the Central Reserve Police Force.
