= Zheng Chen =

Chinese sprinter (born 1965)

Personal information
- Nationality: Chinese
- Born: 4 January 1965 (age 61)

Sport
- Sport: Sprinting
- Event: 100 metres
Medal record
Men's athletics
Representing China
Asian Championships
| Gold medal – first place | 1985 Jakarta | 100 m |
| Gold medal – first place | 1985 Jakarta | 4×100 m |
| Gold medal – first place | 1989 New Delhi | 100 m |
| Gold medal – first place | 1989 New Delhi | 4×100 m |
| Gold medal – first place | 1991 Kuala Lumpur | 4×100 m |
| Silver medal – second place | 1987 Singapore | 4×100 m |

Zheng Chen (born 4 January 1965) is a Chinese sprinter. He competed in the men's 100 metres at the 1988 Summer Olympics. He finished seventh in a second-round heat.
