= Asha Agarwal =

Indian long-distance runner (born 1962)

Personal information
- Born: 26 September 1962 (age 63)

Sport
- Sport: Marathon running
Medal record
Representing India
Asian Championships
Gold medal – first place	1985 Jakarta	Marathon

Asha Agarwal (born 26 September 1962) is an Indian former long-distance runner and a recipient of Arjuna Award. She began competing in marathon events in 1983 and soon made a mark at the domestic level.

Asha Agarwal won the Hong Kong Marathon on 27 January 1985. In September 1985 she won gold at the Asian Track and Field meet in Jakarta, setting a record of 2 hours 48 minutes and 51 seconds, which still stands. She also won the Freedom Race in Delhi in 1989, Trinidad Marathon in 1986 and has run eight out of 26 marathons below 2 hours 50 minutes.
