= Kumi Araki =

Japanese long-distance runner

Kumi Araki (荒木 久美, Araki Kumi; born October 11, 1965) is a retired long-distance runner from Japan. She represented her native country in the women's marathon at the 1988 Summer Olympics in Seoul, South Korea. She won the silver medal in the women's 10.000 metres at the 1986 Asian Games in Seoul, South Korea.

== International competitions ==
Year	Competition	Venue	Position	Event	Notes
Representing Japan
1987	World Championships	Rome, Italy	18th	10,000 m	33:15.08
1988	Olympic Games	Seoul, South Korea	28th	Marathon	2:35:15
1990	Asian Games	Beijing, PR China	2nd	Marathon	2:35:34
1991	World Championships	Tokyo, Japan	12th	Marathon	2:38:27
