= Vandana Rao =

Indian athlete

Medal record

Women's athletics

Representing India

Asian Championships
Gold medal – first place	1985 Jakarta	4×400 m
Gold medal – first place	1987 Singapore	4×400 m
Silver medal – second place	1987 Singapore	4×100 m
Bronze medal – third place	1985 Jakarta	200 m
Bronze medal – third place	1985 Jakarta	4×100 m

Vandana Rao is a former Indian track and field athlete who represented India in 1984 and 1988 Olympics in 4 × 400 m women relay race. She is an Asian Games Gold medalist. She was awarded Arjuna award by government of India for her achievements.

== Career ==
Vandana Rao has represented India in the following International athletic events.

- 1982 Asian Games
- 1984 Summer Olympics
- 1985 Asian Track n Field
- 1985 IAAF World Cup
- 1986 Four Nations and ASIAN Games
- 1987 Asian Track n Field and World Championship
- 1988 Summer Olympics

== Awards ==
- Karnataka State Rajyotsva Award in 1984
- Arjuna Award in 1987

== Personal life ==
She is married to former Indian hockey player and head coach, Joaquim Carvalho.
