= Larisa Mikhalchenko =

Ukrainian discus thrower

Larisa Mikhalchenko (Ukrainian: Лариса Михальченко; born 16 February 1963) is a Ukrainian former discus thrower. Her personal best throw is 70.80 metres, achieved in June 1988 in Kharkov. She was born in Lviv, Ukrainian SSR.

== International competitions ==
Year	Competition	Venue	Position	Notes
Representing Soviet Union
1981	European Junior Championships	Utrecht, Netherlands	3rd	53.38 m
1987	World Championships	Rome, Italy	7th	64.72 m
1988	Olympic Games	Seoul, South Korea	10th	64.08 m
1991	World Championships	Tokyo, Japan	3rd	68.26 m
Representing Ukraine
1993	World Championships	Stuttgart, Germany	10th	60.76 m
