= M. D. Valsamma =

Indian hurdler

Personal information
- Full name: Manathoor Devasia Valsamma
- Nationality: Indian
- Born: 21 October 1960 (age 65) Ottathai, Kannur district, Kerala, India

Sport
- Country: India
- Sport: Track and field
- Event: 400 metres hurdles

Achievements and titles
- Personal bests: 100 m hurdles: 14.02 (Jakarta 1985); 400 m hurdles: 57.81 (1985)
Medal record
Women's athletics
Representing India
Asian Games
Gold medal – first place	1982 New Delhi	400 m hurdles
Gold medal – first place	1986 Seoul	4x400 m relay
Silver medal – second place	1982 New Delhi	4x400 m relay
Asian Championships
Silver medal – second place	1985 Jakarta	400 m hurdles
Bronze medal – third place	1985 Jakarta	4x100 m relay
Bronze medal – third place	1981 Tokyo	400 m hurdles
Bronze medal – third place	1981 Tokyo	4x400 m relay
South Asian Games
Gold medal – first place	1989 Islamabad	4x400 m relay
Silver medal – second place	1989 Islamabad	400 m hurdles
Bronze medal – third place	1989 Islamabad	100 m

Manathoor Devasia Valsamma (born 21 October 1960) is a retired Indian athlete. She was the second Indian woman to win an individual gold medal at the Asian Games and the first to win it on Indian soil.

== Early life ==
Valsamma was born on 21 October 1960 in Ottathai, Kannur district of Kerala. She started her athletics career during school days though she only took it more seriously when she moved to Mercy College, Palakkad, for further studies. Her first medal was for Kerala in the 100 metres hurdles and pentathlon in the Inter-University Championship at Pune in 1979.

She was enrolled in Southern Railway (India) and was coached by A. K. Kutty. She created a great impression at the Inter-State Meet at Bangalore in 1981 by winning five gold medals, the hurdles over 100 and 400 metres in addition to the 400 metres flat and the 400 m and 100 m relays. That performance catapulted her into the Railway and national teams and in 1982 she became the national champion over 400-metre hurdles with a new record, which was also better than the Asian record.

== Professional athletics career ==
Valsamma won the gold medal in the 400 m hurdles in an Indian and Asian record time of 58.47 seconds in front of a home crowd at the Jawaharlal Nehru Stadium in the 1982 Asian Games. This made her the second woman athlete to win an Asian Games gold for India, after Kamaljit Sandhu (400 metres-1974). She later figured in a silver medal-winning 4 X 400 metres relay team. Govt. of India conferred her the Arjuna Award in 1982 and the Padma Shri in 1983 and the G. V. Raja cash award from Kerala Government.

For the first time in the history, the Indian women team entered the finals in the Los Angeles Olympics, 1984 and finished in the seventh position. Valsamma began concentrating more on 100 m hurdles. She won a gold in the 100 m hurdles and created a National record in the first National Games in 1985.

Valsamma also appeared in the Spartakiad 1983 in Moscow, the South Asian Federation (SAF) Games in Islamabad fetched her bronze in the 100 metres, a Silver in the quarter-mile and the Gold m the 4 x 400 metres relay.

In a career spanning nearly 15 years, M.D. Valsamma took part in World Cup meets in Havana, Tokyo, London, the Asian Games editions of 1982, 86, 90 and 94 and in all the Asian Track & Field meets and SAF Games, leaving her mark in each and every competition.
