= Boxing at the 1982 Asian Games =

- Venue: Pragati Maidan
- Dates: 26 November – 3 December 1982
- Competitors: 111 from 19 nations

The Boxing Tournament at the 1982 Asian Games was held in Delhi, India from 26 November to 3 December 1982. South Korea dominated the competition with seven gold medals.

South Korea finished first in medal with winning seven gold medals.

== Schedule ==
| P | Round of 32 | R | Round of 16 | ¼ | Quarterfinals | ½ | Semifinals | F | Final |

| Event↓/Date → | 26th Fri | 27th Sat | 28th Sun | 29th Mon | 30th Tue | 1st Wed | 2nd Thu | 3rd Fri |
|---|---|---|---|---|---|---|---|---|
| Men's 48 kg | R | | ¼ | | ½ | | | F |
| Men's 51 kg | | ¼ | | | ½ | | | F |
| Men's 54 kg | R | | ¼ | | ½ | | | F |
| Men's 57 kg | P | | R | ¼ | ½ | | | F |
| Men's 60 kg | R | ¼ | | | ½ | | | F |
| Men's 63.5 kg | R | | | ¼ | ½ | | | F |
| Men's 67 kg | R | | | ¼ | | ½ | | F |
| Men's 71 kg | | | | ¼ | | ½ | | F |
| Men's 75 kg | | | | ¼ | | ½ | | F |
| Men's 81 kg | | ¼ | | | | ½ | | F |
| Men's 91 kg | | | ¼ | | | ½ | | F |
| Men's +91 kg | | ¼ | | | | ½ | | F |

== Medalists ==
| Event | Gold | Silver | Bronze |
|---|---|---|---|
| Light flyweight (48 kg) | Heo Yong-mo; South Korea | Efren Tabanas; Philippines | Seiki Segawa; Japan |
| Light flyweight (48 kg) | Heo Yong-mo; South Korea | Efren Tabanas; Philippines | Ali Bux; Pakistan |
| Flyweight (51 kg) | Teeraporn Saengano; Thailand | Babar Ali Khan; Pakistan | Kwon Chae-o; South Korea |
| Flyweight (51 kg) | Teeraporn Saengano; Thailand | Babar Ali Khan; Pakistan | Kazuhiko Abe; Japan |
| Bantamweight (54 kg) | Moon Sung-kil; South Korea | Wanchai Pongsri; Thailand | Mukhtar Muhammad; Pakistan |
| Bantamweight (54 kg) | Moon Sung-kil; South Korea | Wanchai Pongsri; Thailand | Pyon Song-o; North Korea |
| Featherweight (57 kg) | Jo Ryon-sik; North Korea | Park Ki-chul; South Korea | Nidal Haddad; Syria |
| Featherweight (57 kg) | Jo Ryon-sik; North Korea | Park Ki-chul; South Korea | Shinji Higuchi; Japan |
| Lightweight (60 kg) | Jong Jo-ung; North Korea | Kwon Hyun-kyu; South Korea | Fernando de Assis; Philippines |
| Lightweight (60 kg) | Jong Jo-ung; North Korea | Kwon Hyun-kyu; South Korea | Jaslal Pradhan; India |
| Light welterweight (63.5 kg) | Kim Dong-kil; South Korea | Dhawee Umponmaha; Thailand | Son Son-chan; North Korea |
| Light welterweight (63.5 kg) | Kim Dong-kil; South Korea | Dhawee Umponmaha; Thailand | Farouk Janjoun; Iraq |
| Welterweight (67 kg) | Chung Yong-beom; South Korea | Ryu Bun-hwa; North Korea | C. C. Machaiah; India |
| Welterweight (67 kg) | Chung Yong-beom; South Korea | Ryu Bun-hwa; North Korea | Raymundo Suico; Philippines |
| Light middleweight (71 kg) | Lee Hae-jung; South Korea | Imad Idriss; Syria | Muhammad Niaz; Pakistan |
| Light middleweight (71 kg) | Lee Hae-jung; South Korea | Imad Idriss; Syria | Muluk Singh; India |
| Middleweight (75 kg) | Lee Nam-eui; South Korea | Rajendra Kumar Puneda; India | Ahmad Al-Rabee; Kuwait |
| Middleweight (75 kg) | Lee Nam-eui; South Korea | Rajendra Kumar Puneda; India | Muzaffar Ahmed; Pakistan |
| Light heavyweight (81 kg) | Hong Ki-ho; South Korea | Girwar Singh; India | Ri Un-yong; North Korea |
| Light heavyweight (81 kg) | Hong Ki-ho; South Korea | Girwar Singh; India | Habibullah Khan; Pakistan |
| Heavyweight (91 kg) | Kaur Singh; India | Ismail Khalil; Iraq | Sambuugiin Khicheengui; Mongolia |
| Heavyweight (91 kg) | Kaur Singh; India | Ismail Khalil; Iraq | So Bae-won; South Korea |
| Super heavyweight (+91 kg) | Cho Bong-gil; North Korea | Imtiaz Mahmood; Pakistan | Naiem Shumais; Kuwait |
| Super heavyweight (+91 kg) | Cho Bong-gil; North Korea | Imtiaz Mahmood; Pakistan | Kim Hyun-ho; South Korea |

== Medal table ==
| Rank | Nation | Gold | Silver | Bronze | Total |
|---|---|---|---|---|---|
| 1 | South Korea (KOR) | 7 | 2 | 3 | 12 |
| 2 | North Korea (PRK) | 3 | 1 | 3 | 7 |
| 3 | India (IND) | 1 | 2 | 3 | 6 |
| 4 | Thailand (THA) | 1 | 2 | 0 | 3 |
| 5 | Pakistan (PAK) | 0 | 2 | 5 | 7 |
| 6 | Philippines (PHI) | 0 | 1 | 2 | 3 |
| 7 | Iraq (IRQ) | 0 | 1 | 1 | 2 |
| 7 | Syria (SYR) | 0 | 1 | 1 | 2 |
| 9 | Japan (JPN) | 0 | 0 | 3 | 3 |
| 10 | Kuwait (KUW) | 0 | 0 | 2 | 2 |
| 11 | Mongolia (MGL) | 0 | 0 | 1 | 1 |
| Totals (11 entries) | | 12 | 12 | 24 | 48 |

== Participating nations ==
A total of 111 athletes from 19 nations competed in boxing at the 1982 Asian Games:

- Afghanistan (2)
- Bangladesh (5)
- Hong Kong (1)
- India (12)
- Indonesia (4)
- Iraq (3)
- Japan (7)
- Kuwait (6)
- Mongolia (4)
- Nepal (3)
- North Korea (9)
- Pakistan (12)
- Philippines (6)
- Saudi Arabia (4)
- South Korea (12)
- South Yemen (3)
- Sri Lanka (6)
- Syria (3)
- Thailand (9)
