= Boxing at the 1982 Asian Games – Men's 57 kg =

Boxing competitions

Men's 57 kg at the 1982 Asian Games
- Venue: Pragati Maidan
- Date: 26 November – 3 December 1982
- Competitors: 17 from 17 nations

Medalists
gold medal	Jo Ryon-sik	North Korea
silver medal	Park Ki-chul	South Korea
bronze medal	Nidal Haddad	Syria
bronze medal	Shinji Higuchi	Japan

The men's featherweight (57 kilograms) event at the 1982 Asian Games took place from 26 November to 3 December 1982 at Pragati Maidan, New Delhi, India.

A boxer may win by knockout or by points with 5 judges scoring each round. The boxer with the higher score from a majority of the judges is the winner.

== Schedule ==
All times are Indian Standard Time (UTC+05:30)

Date	Time	Event
Friday, 26 November 1982	15:00	1st round
Sunday, 28 November 1982	15:00	2nd round
Monday, 29 November 1982	15:00	Quarterfinals
Tuesday, 30 November 1982	15:00	Semifinals
Friday, 3 December 1982	15:00	Final

== Results ==
Legend

- DSQ — Won by disqualification
- KO — Won by knockout
- RSC — Won by referee stop contest

=== Final ===
Final
Jo Ryon-sik (PRK)	3
Park Ki-chul (KOR)	2

=== Top half ===
1st round

2nd round
Dal Bahadur Ranamagar (NEP)	0
Jo Ryon-sik (PRK)	5
Leopoldo Cantancio (PHI)	KO
Gunaratne de Silva (SRI)
Atiar Rahman (BAN)
Nidal Haddad (SYR)	KO
Mariam Xavier (IND)	5
Ravsalyn Otgonbayar (MGL)	0

Quarterfinals
Jo Ryon-sik (PRK)	KO
Leopoldo Cantancio (PHI)
Nidal Haddad (SYR)	3
Mariam Xavier (IND)	2

Semifinals
Jo Ryon-sik (PRK)	5
Nidal Haddad (SYR)	0

=== Bottom half ===
1st round
Shamsan Khalil Mohammed (ADE)	5
Hassan Al-Dosary (SAU)	0

2nd round
Charles Yeristow (INA)	KO
Ibrahim Al-Austa (KUW)
Chor Kongkhunmuang (THA)
Park Ki-chul (KOR)	DSQ
Shinji Higuchi (JPN)	5
Nisar Ahmad Qarizada (AFG)	0
Muhammad Tariq (PAK)	RSC
Shamsan Khalil Mohammed (ADE)

Quarterfinals
Charles Yeristow (INA)	0
Park Ki-chul (KOR)	5
Shinji Higuchi (JPN)	5
Muhammad Tariq (PAK)	0

Semifinals
Park Ki-chul (KOR)	5
Shinji Higuchi (JPN)	0
