= Athletics at the 1982 Asian Games – Men's 100 metres =

Men's 100 metres at the 1982 Asian Games
- Venue: Jawaharlal Nehru Stadium
- Date: 27–28 November
- Competitors: 40 from 22 nations

Medalists
| gold medal | Rabuan Pit | Malaysia |
| silver medal | Jang Jae-keun | South Korea |
| bronze medal | Suchart Jairsuraparp | Thailand |

The men's 100 metres competition at the 1982 Asian Games took place on 27 and 28 November 1982 at the Jawaharlal Nehru Stadium.

== Schedule ==
All times are Western Indonesia Time (UTC+07:00)

| Date | Event |
|---|---|
| Saturday, 27 November 1982 | Round 1 |
| Saturday, 27 November 1982 | Semifinals |
| Sunday, 28 November 1982 | Final |

== Results ==
=== Round 1 ===
- Qualification: First 4 in each heat (Q) and the next 4 fastest (q) advance to the semifinals.

==== Heat 1 ====
- Wind: +0.3 m/s

| Rank | Athlete | Time | Notes |
|---|---|---|---|
| 1 | Yoshihiro Shimizu (JPN) | 10.77 | Q |
| 2 | Sumet Promna (THA) | 10.82 | Q |
| 3 | Tang Ngai-kin (SIN) | 11.06 | Q |
| 4 | Anand Shetty (IND) | 11.11 | Q |
| 5 | Mubarak Khamis Anter (OMA) | 11.65 | |
| 6 | Mohamed Ismail Baraki (AFG) | 11.99 | |

==== Heat 2 ====
- Wind: -1.7 m/s

| Rank | Athlete | Time | Notes |
|---|---|---|---|
| 1 | Faraj Saad Marzouk (QAT) | 10.66 | Q |
| 2 | Yuan Guoqiang (CHI) | 10.68 | Q |
| 3 | Sikander Iqbal Zafar (PAK) | 10.80 | Q |
| 4 | Suh Mei-guh (KOR) | 10.85 | Q |
| 5 | Chong Hun-young (PRK) | 10.91 | |
| 6 | Julius Affar (INA) | 10.91 | |
| 7 | Mohamed Mutheeb (KSA) | 11.27 | |

==== Heat 3 ====
- Wind: -0.7 m/s

| Rank | Athlete | Time | Notes |
|---|---|---|---|
| 1 | Jang Jae-keun (KOR) | 10.82 | Q |
| 2 | Mohamed Yudi Purnomo (INA) | 10.89 | Q |
| 3 | Hideyuki Arikawa (JPN) | 10.93 | Q |
| 4 | Tariq Mahboob (PAK) | 10.97 | Q |
| 5 | Saidur Rahman Dawn (BAN) | 11.14 | |
| 6 | Salem Ahmed Nagib (YMD) | 11.25 | |
| 7 | Ibrahim Al-Jerbi (UAE) | 11.31 | |
| 8 | Ahmad Bari Al-Moghazi (YAR) | 11.51 | |

==== Heat 4 ====
- Wind: −0.7 m/s

| Rank | Athlete | Time | Notes |
|---|---|---|---|
| 1 | Rabuan Pit (MAS) | 10.84 | Q |
| 2 | Wang Shaoming (CHI) | 11.02 | Q |
| 3 | Mohamed Fahd Al-Yanbaoui (KSA) | 11.15 | Q |
| 4 | Abdullah Sulaiman Al-Akbary (OMA) | 11.22 | Q |
| 5 | Ahmad Quassim Al-Sadoon (BAH) | 11.32 | q |
| 6 | Sitthixay Sacpraseuth (LAO) | 11.37 | |
| 7 | Ahmed Abdullah Kassim (YMD) | 11.45 | |
| 8 | Jitendra Chaudhari (NEP) | 11.81 | |

==== Heat 5 ====
- Wind: +0.6 m/s

| Rank | Athlete | Time | Notes |
|---|---|---|---|
| 1 | Suchart Jairsuraparp (THA) | 10.73 | Q |
| 2 | Rashid Ismail Al-Jerbi (UAE) | 10.79 | Q |
| 3 | Ellron Alfred Angian (MAS) | 10.86 | Q |
| 4 | Harun Mundir (SIN) | 10.89 | Q |
| 5 | Adille Sumariwalla (IND) | 10.93 | q |
| 6 | Nabil Nahri (SYR) | 10.96 | q |
| 7 | Mansoor Habib Mutaibeg (BAH) | 11.40 | |
| 8 | Hussain Saleh Al-Baydani (YAR) | 12.09 | |

- Zakiul Haque Zaki (BAN), I.Wayan Budi Astra (INA) and Habib Shah (PAK) were non-competing participants.

=== Semifinals ===
- Qualification: First 2 in each heat (Q) and the next 2 fastest (q) advance to the final.

==== Heat 1 ====
- Wind: +2.4 m/s

| Rank | Athlete | Time | Notes |
|---|---|---|---|
| 1 | Suchart Jairsurabharp (THA) | 10.53 | Q |
| 2 | Mohamed Yudi Purnomo (INA) | 10.60 | Q |
| 3 | Rashid Ismail Al-Jerbi (UAE) | 10.66 | |
| 4 | Jang Jae-keun (KOR) | 10.70 | |
| 5 | Ellron Alfred Angian (MAS) | 10.72 | |
| 6 | Yuan Guoqiang (CHI) | 10.76 | |
| 7 | Tang Ngai-kin (SIN) | 10.80 | |
| 8 | Hideyuki Arikawa (JPN) | 11.07 | |

==== Heat 2 ====
- Wind: -1.7 m/s

| Rank | Athlete | Time | Notes |
|---|---|---|---|
| 1 | Rabuan Pit (MAS) | 10.65 | Q |
| 2 | Sumet Promna (THA) | 10.71 | Q |
| 3 | Yoshihiro Shimizu (JPN) | 10.79 | |
| 4 | Faraj Saad Marzouk (QAT) | 10.83 | |
| 5 | Suh Mei-guh (KOR) | 10.90 | |
| 6 | Sikander Iqbal Zafar (PAK) | 10.92 | |
| 7 | Wang Shaoming (CHI) | 10.97 | |
| 8 | Mohamed Fahd Al-Yanbaoui (KSA) | 11.03 | |

=== Final ===
- Wind: -1.3 m/s

| Rank | Athlete | Time | Notes |
|---|---|---|---|
| 1st place, gold medalist(s) | Rabuan Pit (MAS) | 10.68 | |
| 2nd place, silver medalist(s) | Jang Jae-keun (KOR) | 10.72 | |
| 3rd place, bronze medalist(s) | Suchart Jairsuraparp (THA) | 10.76 | |
| 4 | Mohamed Yudi Purnomo (INA) | 10.80 | |
| 5 | Sumet Promna (THA) | 10.81 | |
| 6 | Rashid Ismail Al-Jerbi (UAE) | 10.82 | |
| 7 | Yoshihiro Shimizu (JPN) | 10.84 | |
| 8 | Ellron Alfred Angin (MAS) | 10.96 | |
