= Boxing at the 1982 Asian Games – Men's 67 kg =

Boxing competitions

Men's 67 kg at the 1982 Asian Games
- Venue: Pragati Maidan
- Date: 26 November – 3 December 1982
- Competitors: 11 from 11 nations

Medalists
| gold medal | Chung Yong-beom | South Korea |
| silver medal | Ryu Bun-hwa | North Korea |
| bronze medal | C. C. Machaiah | India |
| bronze medal | Raymundo Suico | Philippines |

The men's welterweight (67 kilograms) event at the 1982 Asian Games took place from 26 November to 3 December 1982 at Pragati Maidan, New Delhi, India.

A boxer may win by knockout or by points with 5 judges scoring each round. The boxer with the higher score from a majority of the judges is the winner.

== Schedule ==
All times are Indian Standard Time (UTC+05:30)

| Date | Time | Event |
|---|---|---|
| Friday, 26 November 1982 | 15:00 | 1st round |
| Monday, 29 November 1982 | 15:00 | Quarterfinals |
| Wednesday, 1 December 1982 | 15:00 | Semifinals |
| Friday, 3 December 1982 | 15:00 | Final |

== Results ==
Legend

- KO — Won by knockout
- RET — Won by retirement
- RSC — Won by referee stop contest

1st round
Naief Al-Rumy (SAU)
Jayasiri Gunasekara (SRI) | RET
Made Adi Suwandana (INA) | 1
Qadir Zaman (PAK) | 4
Mamoru Abe (JPN)
Ryu Bun-hwa (PRK) | RET

Quarterfinals
Waleed Al-Dusari (KUW)
C. C. Machaiah (IND) | KO
Chung Yong-beom (KOR) | KO
Delwar Hossain (BAN)
Raymundo Suico (PHI) | 5
Jayasiri Gunasekara (SRI) | 0
Qadir Zaman (PAK) | 1
Ryu Bun-hwa (PRK) | 4

Semifinals
C. C. Machaiah (IND) | 1
Chung Yong-beom (KOR) | 4
Raymundo Suico (PHI) | 1
Ryu Bun-hwa (PRK) | 4

Final
Chung Yong-beom (KOR) | RSC
Ryu Bun-hwa (PRK)
