= Athletics at the 1982 Asian Games =

- Venue: Jawaharlal Nehru Stadium
- Dates: 25 November – 2 December 1982

The athletics at the 1982 Asian Games were held in Jawaharlal Nehru Stadium, New Delhi, India.

== Medalists ==
=== Men ===
Event	Gold		Silver		Bronze	
100 m	Rabuan Pit; Malaysia	10.68	Jang Jae-keun; South Korea	10.72	Suchart Jairsuraparp; Thailand	10.76
200 m	Jang Jae-keun; South Korea	20.89; GR	Toshio Toyota; Japan	21.13	Rabuan Pit; Malaysia	21.25
400 m	Susumu Takano; Japan	46.65	K. K. Premachandran; India	47.27	Guo Shunqi; China	47.36
800 m	Charles Borromeo; India	1:46.81; GR	Kim Bok-joo; South Korea	1:47.55	Falah Naji; Iraq	1:47.73
1500 m	Falah Naji; Iraq	3:43.49; GR	Yutaka Hirai; Japan	3:45.26	Suresh Yadav; India	3:45.62
5000 m	Masanari Shintaku; Japan	13:53.74; GR	Zhang Guowei; China	13:58.09	Raj Kumar; India	13:59.90
10,000 m	Zhang Guowei; China	29:37.56; GR	Kenji Ide; Japan	29:37.71	Park Won-keun; South Korea	29:38.17
110 m hurdles	Yoshifumi Fujimori; Japan	14.09; GR	Zhang Shensheng; China	14.51	Praveen Jolly; India	14.52
400 m hurdles	Takashi Nagao; Japan	50.60; GR	Shigenori Omori; Japan	50.83	Ahmed Hamada; Bahrain	50.99
3000 m steeplechase	Tadasu Kawano; Japan	8:47.36	Gopal Saini; India	8:50.28	Hector Begeo; Philippines	8:52.40
4 × 100 m relay	China; Wang Shaoming; He Baodong; Yu Zhuanghui; Yuan Guoqiang	39.82; GR	Thailand; Somsak Boontud; Suchart Jairsuraparp; Prasit Boonprasert; Sumet Promna	39.92	Japan; Yoshihiro Shimizu; Toshio Toyota; Junichi Usui; Kazunori Asaba	39.97
4 × 400 m relay	Japan; Kazunori Asaba; Shigenori Omori; Hiromi Kawasumi; Junichi Usui	3:06.75; GR	Iraq; Hussein Ali; Abbas Laibi; Hussein Ali; Aouf Abdul-Rahman	3:08.34	China; Yuan Guoqiang; He Baodong; Tan Honghai; Guo Shunqi	3:09.57
Marathon	Kim Yang-kon; South Korea	2:22:21	Fumiaki Abe; Japan	2:24:09	Hosur Kukkappa Seetarama; India	2:25:07
20 km walk	Siri Chand Ram; India	1:29:29; GR	Wang Chuntang; China	1:29:50	Zhang Fuxin; China	1:33:34
50 km walk	Wang Chuntang; China	4:09:36; GR	Qiu Shiyong; China	4:19:43	Akira Fujisaki; Japan	4:39:41
High jump	Zhu Jianhua; China	2.33; GR	Cai Shu; China	2.22	Takao Sakamoto; Japan	2.14
Pole vault	Tomomi Takahashi; Japan	5.30; GR	Teruhisa Kamiya; Japan	5.11	Zhang Cheng; China	5.00
Long jump	Kim Jong-il; South Korea	7.94	Liu Yuhuang; China	7.89	Junichi Usui; Japan	7.87
Triple jump	Zou Zhenxian; China	16.80; GR	Yasushi Ueta; Japan	16.23	Sammudi Balasubramaniam; India	16.14
Shot put	Bahadur Singh Chauhan; India	18.54; GR	Mohammad Al-Zinkawi; Kuwait	17.56	Balwinder Singh; India	17.44
Discus throw	Li Weinan; China	58.50; GR	Kuldip Singh; India	53.50	Li Zheng; China	53.34
Hammer throw	Shigenobu Murofushi; Japan	71.14; GR	Masayuki Kawata; Japan	66.96	Xie Yingqi; China	64.48
Javelin throw	Toshihiko Takeda; Japan	75.04	Yang Eun-myung; South Korea	73.62	Gurtej Singh; India	71.58
Decathlon	Weng Kangqiang; China	7431; GR	Zhai Yingjian; China	7232	Monassar Mohamed Saleh; Qatar	7009

=== Women ===
Event	Gold		Silver		Bronze	
100 m	Lydia de Vega; Philippines	11.76	P. T. Usha; India	11.95	Mo Myung-hee; South Korea	11.99
200 m	Hiromi Isozaki; Japan	24.22	P. T. Usha; India	24.32	Mo Myung-hee; South Korea	24.49
400 m	Hiromi Isozaki; Japan	54.43; GR	Junko Yoshida; Japan	54.75	Padmini Thomas; India	55.14
800 m	Chang Yong-ae; North Korea	2:05.69; GR	Geeta Zutshi; India	2:05.77	Guo Guimei; China	2:06.59
1500 m	Chang Yong-ae; North Korea	4:18.40; GR	Geeta Zutshi; India	4:23.22	Kim Ok-sun; North Korea	4:26.58
3000 m	Kim Ok-sun; North Korea	9:30.22	Kim Chun-hwa; North Korea	9:32.36	Shino Izutsu; Japan	9:34.44
100 m hurdles	Emi Akimoto; Japan	13.63	Chizuko Akimoto; Japan	13.98	Dai Jianhua; China	14.00
400 m hurdles	M. D. Valsamma; India	58.47; GR	Yumiko Aoi; Japan	59.08	Liu Guihua; China	59.42
4 × 100 m relay	Japan; Emiko Konishi; Hiromi Isozaki; Emi Akimoto; Junko Yoshida	45.13; GR	Thailand; Walapa Tangjitnusorn; Jaree Patarach; Sumalee Poosup; Pusadee Sangvijit	45.97	South Korea; Mo Myung-hee; Chun Jung-shik; Park Mi-sun; Chun Kyung-mi	46.27
4 × 400 m relay	Japan; Hitomi Koshimoto; Junko Yoshida; Izumi Takahata; Hiromi Isozaki	3:37.44; GR	India; Rita Sen; Hamida Banu; M. D. Valsamma; Padmini Thomas	3:38.32	China; Liang Yueling; Liu Guihua; Guo Guimei; Gao Yanqing	3:39.84
High jump	Zheng Dazhen; China	1.89; GR	Hisayo Fukumitsu; Japan	1.87	Yang Wenqin; China	1.85
Long jump	Liao Wenfen; China	6.41; GR	Mercy Kuttan; India	6.26	Li Huirong; China	6.20
Shot put	Li Meisu; China	17.77; GR	Shen Lijuan; China	17.25	Tetsuko Watase; Japan	13.90
Discus throw	Li Xiaohui; China	57.24; GR	Xin Xiaoyan; China	52.20	Harumi Suzuki; Japan	47.20
Javelin throw	Emi Matsui; Japan	60.52; GR	Li Shufen; China	58.12	Minori Mori; Japan	54.70
Heptathlon	Ye Peisu; China	5594; GR	Ye Lianying; China	5493	Tomoko Uchida; Japan	5423

== Medal table ==
Rank	Nation	Gold	Silver	Bronze	Total
1	Japan (JPN)	15	12	9	36
2	China (CHN)	12	11	12	35
3	India (IND)	4	9	8	21
4	South Korea (KOR)	3	3	4	10
5	North Korea (PRK)	3	1	1	5
6	Iraq (IRQ)	1	1	1	3
7	Malaysia (MAL)	1	0	1	2
7	Philippines (PHI)	1	0	1	2
9	Thailand (THA)	0	2	1	3
10	Kuwait (KUW)	0	1	0	1
11	Bahrain (BRN)	0	0	1	1
11	Qatar (QAT)	0	0	1	1
Totals (12 entries)		40	40	40	120
