= Boxing at the 1982 Asian Games – Men's 60 kg =

Boxing competitions

Men's 60 kg at the 1982 Asian Games
- Venue: Pragati Maidan
- Date: 26 November – 3 December 1982
- Competitors: 11 from 11 nations

Medalists
gold medal	Jong Jo-ung	North Korea
silver medal	Kwon Hyun-kyu	South Korea
bronze medal	Fernando de Assis	Philippines
bronze medal	Jaslal Pradhan	India

The men's lightweight (60 kilograms) event at the 1982 Asian Games took place from 26 November to 3 December 1982 at Pragati Maidan, New Delhi, India.

A boxer may win by knockout or by points with 5 judges scoring each round. The boxer with the higher score from a majority of the judges is the winner.

== Schedule ==
All times are Indian Standard Time (UTC+05:30)

Date	Time	Event
Friday, 26 November 1982	15:00	1st round
Saturday, 27 November 1982	15:00	Quarterfinals
Tuesday, 30 November 1982	15:00	Semifinals
Friday, 3 December 1982	15:00	Final

== Results ==
Legend

- KO — Won by knockout
- RSC — Won by referee stop contest

1st round
Jean Ghazal (SYR)
Somchai Sawadiwong (THA)	RSC
Hiroki Higashi (JPN)
Nergüin Enkhbat (MGL)	KO
Jaslal Pradhan (IND)	RSC
Kanchan Ali Sarder (BAN)

Quarterfinals
Brian Rose (PAK)	0
Jong Jo-ung (PRK)	5
Soliman Al-Shaban (SAU)	0
Fernando de Assis (PHI)	5
Kwon Hyun-kyu (KOR)	5
Somchai Sawadiwong (THA)	0
Nergüin Enkhbat (MGL)	1
Jaslal Pradhan (IND)	4

Semifinals
Jong Jo-ung (PRK)	4
Fernando de Assis (PHI)	1
Kwon Hyun-kyu (KOR)	4
Jaslal Pradhan (IND)	1

Final
Jong Jo-ung (PRK)	4
Kwon Hyun-kyu (KOR)	1
