= Wrestling at the 1982 Asian Games =

- Venue: Ambedkar Stadium
- Dates: 28 November – 2 December 1982
- Competitors: 109 from 17 nations

Wrestling was one of the sports which was held at the 1982 Asian Games in Ambedkar Stadium, New Delhi, India, between 28 November and 2 December 1982.

The competition included only men's freestyle events.

== Medalists ==
Event	Gold	Silver	Bronze
48 kg	Takashi Kobayashi; Japan	Kim Chol-han; North Korea	Son Gab-do; South Korea
52 kg	Toshio Asakura; Japan	Mohammad Hossein Dabbaghi; Iran	Kim Jong-kyu; South Korea
57 kg	Hideaki Tomiyama; Japan	Askari Mohammadian; Iran	Ashok Kumar; India
62 kg	Hiroshi Kaneko; Japan	Lee Jung-keun; South Korea	Ahmad Rezaei; Iran
68 kg	Buyandelgeriin Bold; Mongolia	Masakazu Kamimura; Japan	You In-tak; South Korea
74 kg	Mohammad Hossein Mohebbi; Iran	Go Jin-won; South Korea	Choe Sang-mo; North Korea
82 kg	Zevegiin Düvchin; Mongolia	Taj Mohammad Khairi; Afghanistan	Pak Gi-hong; North Korea
90 kg	Mohammad Hassan Mohebbi; Iran	Kartar Singh; India	Akira Ota; Japan
100 kg	Satpal Singh; India	Dashdorjiin Tserentogtokh; Mongolia	Mahmoud Moradi Ganji; Iran
+100 kg	Reza Soukhtehsaraei; Iran	Farhan Jassim; Iraq	Rajinder Singh; India

== Medal table ==
Rank	Nation	Gold	Silver	Bronze	Total
1	Japan (JPN)	4	1	1	6
2	Iran (IRN)	3	2	2	7
3	Mongolia (MGL)	2	1	0	3
4	India (IND)	1	1	2	4
5	South Korea (KOR)	0	2	3	5
6	North Korea (PRK)	0	1	2	3
7	Afghanistan (AFG)	0	1	0	1
7	Iraq (IRQ)	0	1	0	1
Totals (8 entries)		10	10	10	30

== Participating nations ==
A total of 109 athletes from 17 nations competed in wrestling at the 1982 Asian Games:

- Afghanistan (10)
- Bangladesh (3)
- China (4)
- India (10)
- Indonesia (5)
- Iran (10)
- Iraq (5)
- Japan (10)
- Mongolia (5)
- North Korea (9)
- North Yemen (4)
- Pakistan (4)
- Philippines (4)
- Saudi Arabia (10)
- South Korea (9)
- Sri Lanka (2)
- Syria (5)
