= Boxing at the 1982 Asian Games – Men's 51 kg =

Boxing competitions

Men's 51 kg at the 1982 Asian Games
- Venue: Pragati Maidan
- Date: 27 November – 3 December 1982
- Competitors: 8 from 8 nations

Medalists
gold medal	Teeraporn Saengano	Thailand
silver medal	Babar Ali Khan	Pakistan
bronze medal	Kwon Chae-o	South Korea
bronze medal	Kazuhiko Abe	Japan

The men's flyweight (51 kilograms) event at the 1982 Asian Games took place from 27 November to 3 December 1982 at Pragati Maidan, New Delhi, India.

A boxer may win by knockout or by points with 5 judges scoring each round. The boxer with the higher score from a majority of the judges is the winner.

== Schedule ==
All times are Indian Standard Time (UTC+05:30)

Date	Time	Event
Saturday, 27 November 1982	15:00	Quarterfinals
Tuesday, 30 November 1982	15:00	Semifinals
Friday, 3 December 1982	15:00	Final

== Results ==
Legend

- WO — Won by walkover

Quarterfinals		Semifinals		Final
Isaac Amaldas (IND)	0
Kwon Chae-o (KOR)	5	Kwon Chae-o (KOR)	2
Teeraporn Saengano (THA)	5	Teeraporn Saengano (THA)	3
Ri Song-guk (PRK)	0			Teeraporn Saengano (THA)	5
W. M. Chithrananda (SRI)	0			Babar Ali Khan (PAK)	0
Babar Ali Khan (PAK)	5	Babar Ali Khan (PAK)	WO
Leopoldo Serantes (PHI)	1	Kazuhiko Abe (JPN)
Kazuhiko Abe (JPN)	4
