= Boxing at the 1982 Asian Games – Men's 81 kg =

Boxing competitions

Men's 81 kg at the 1982 Asian Games
- Venue: Pragati Maidan
- Date: 27 November – 3 December 1982
- Competitors: 8 from 8 nations

Medalists
gold medal	Hong Ki-ho	South Korea
silver medal	Girwar Singh	India
bronze medal	Ri Un-yong	North Korea
bronze medal	Habibullah Khan	Pakistan

The men's light heavyweight (81 kilograms) event at the 1982 Asian Games took place from 27 November to 3 December 1982 at Pragati Maidan, New Delhi, India.

A boxer may win by knockout or by points with 5 judges scoring each round. The boxer with the higher score from a majority of the judges is the winner.

== Schedule ==
All times are Indian Standard Time (UTC+05:30)

Date	Time	Event
Saturday, 27 November 1982	15:00	Quarterfinals
Wednesday, 1 December 1982	15:00	Semifinals
Friday, 3 December 1982	15:00	Final

== Results ==
Legend

- KO — Won by knockout

Quarterfinals
Amer Jabbar (IRQ)
Hong Ki-ho (KOR)	KO
Chan Wing Chung (HKG)
Ri Un-yong (PRK)	KO
Girwar Singh (IND)	KO
Ali Saleh (KUW)
Anan Inkaraket (THA)	2
Habibullah Khan (PAK)	3

Semifinals
Hong Ki-ho (KOR)	5
Ri Un-yong (PRK)	0
Girwar Singh (IND)	4
Habibullah Khan (PAK)	1

Final
Hong Ki-ho (KOR)	4
Girwar Singh (IND)	1
