= Boxing at the 1982 Asian Games – Men's 54 kg =

Boxing competitions

Men's 54 kg at the 1982 Asian Games
- Venue: Pragati Maidan
- Date: 26 November – 3 December 1982
- Competitors: 12 from 12 nations

Medalists
gold medal	Moon Sung-kil	South Korea
silver medal	Wanchai Pongsri	Thailand
bronze medal	Mukhtar Muhammad	Pakistan
bronze medal	Pyon Song-o	North Korea

The men's bantamweight (54 kilograms) event at the 1982 Asian Games took place from 26 November to 3 December 1982 at Pragati Maidan, New Delhi, India.

A boxer may win by knockout or by points with 5 judges scoring each round. The boxer with the higher score from a majority of the judges is the winner.

== Schedule ==
All times are Indian Standard Time (UTC+05:30)

Date	Time	Event
Friday, 26 November 1982	15:00	1st round
Sunday, 28 November 1982	15:00	Quarterfinals
Tuesday, 30 November 1982	15:00	Semifinals
Friday, 3 December 1982	15:00	Final

== Results ==
Legend

- KO — Won by knockout
- RET — Won by retirement
- WO — Won by walkover

1st round
Moon Sung-kil (KOR)	RET
Anil Jayalath (SRI)
Hiroaki Takami (JPN)	5
Subramani Nithyanandan (IND)	0
Umesh Maskey (NEP)	0
Pyon Song-o (PRK)	5
Mohammad Saber Sharifi (AFG)	5
Noaman Raed Ali (ADE)	0

Quarterfinals
Syed Mohiuddin Ahmed (BAN)	0
Mukhtar Muhammad (PAK)	5
Diosdado Mares (PHI)	0
Wanchai Pongsri (THA)	5
Moon Sung-kil (KOR)	4
Hiroaki Takami (JPN)	1
Pyon Song-o (PRK)	4
Mohammad Saber Sharifi (AFG)	1

Semifinals
Mukhtar Muhammad (PAK)
Wanchai Pongsri (THA)	WO
Moon Sung-kil (KOR)	5
Pyon Song-o (PRK)	0

Final
Wanchai Pongsri (THA)
Moon Sung-kil (KOR)	KO
