= Boxing at the 1982 Asian Games – Men's 63.5 kg =

Boxing competitions

Men's 63.5 kg at the 1982 Asian Games
- Venue: Pragati Maidan
- Date: 26 November – 3 December 1982
- Competitors: 9 from 9 nations

Medalists
gold medal	Kim Dong-kil	South Korea
silver medal	Dhawee Umponmaha	Thailand
bronze medal	Son Son-chan	North Korea
bronze medal	Farouk Janjoun	Iraq

The men's light welterweight (63.5 kilograms) event at the 1982 Asian Games took place from 26 November to 3 December 1982 at Pragati Maidan, New Delhi, India.

A boxer may win by knockout or by points with 5 judges scoring each round. The boxer with the higher score from a majority of the judges is the winner.

== Schedule ==
All times are Indian Standard Time (UTC+05:30)

Date	Time	Event
Friday, 26 November 1982	15:00	1st round
Monday, 29 November 1982	15:00	Quarterfinals
Tuesday, 30 November 1982	15:00	Semifinals
Friday, 3 December 1982	15:00	Final

== Results ==
Legend

- RSC — Won by referee stop contest

1st round
Nobuaki Hiranaka (JPN)	0
Dhawee Umponmaha (THA)	5

Quarterfinals
Kim Dong-kil (KOR)	RSC
Galsandorjiin Batbileg (MGL)
Son Son-chan (PRK)	5
Muhammad Khalid (PAK)	0
Nar Bahadur Yonjan (NEP)	0
Farouk Janjoun (IRQ)	5
Dharam Chand (IND)	0
Dhawee Umponmaha (THA)	5

Semifinals
Kim Dong-kil (KOR)	5
Son Son-chan (PRK)	0
Farouk Janjoun (IRQ)	0
Dhawee Umponmaha (THA)	5

Final
Kim Dong-kil (KOR)	5
Dhawee Umponmaha (THA)	0
