= Boxing at the 1982 Asian Games – Men's +91 kg =

Boxing competitions

Men's +91 kg at the 1982 Asian Games
- Venue: Pragati Maidan
- Date: 27 November – 3 December 1982
- Competitors: 6 from 6 nations

Medalists
gold medal	Cho Bong-gil	North Korea
silver medal	Imtiaz Mahmood	Pakistan
bronze medal	Naiem Shumais	Kuwait
bronze medal	Kim Hyun-ho	South Korea

The men's super heavyweight (+91 kilograms) event at the 1982 Asian Games took place from 27 November to 3 December 1982 at Pragati Maidan, New Delhi, India.

A boxer may win by knockout or by points with 5 judges scoring each round. The boxer with the higher score from a majority of the judges is the winner.

== Schedule ==
All times are Indian Standard Time (UTC+05:30)

Date	Time	Event
Saturday, 27 November 1982	15:00	Quarterfinals
Wednesday, 1 December 1982	15:00	Semifinals
Friday, 3 December 1982	15:00	Final

== Results ==
Quarterfinals
Lodwyk Akwan (INA)	1
Kim Hyun-ho (KOR)	4
Cho Bong-gil (PRK)	5
Brij Mohan Sharma (IND)	0

Semifinals
Imtiaz Mahmood (PAK)	5
Naiem Shumais (KUW)	0
Kim Hyun-ho (KOR)	2
Cho Bong-gil (PRK)	3

Final
Imtiaz Mahmood (PAK)	0
Cho Bong-gil (PRK)	5
