= Boxing at the 1982 Asian Games – Men's 91 kg =

Boxing competitions

Men's 91 kg at the 1982 Asian Games
- Venue: Pragati Maidan
- Date: 28 November – 3 December 1982
- Competitors: 6 from 6 nations

Medalists
gold medal	Kaur Singh	India
silver medal	Ismail Khalil	Iraq
bronze medal	Sambuugiin Khicheengui	Mongolia
bronze medal	So Bae-won	South Korea

The men's heavyweight (91 kilograms) event at the 1982 Asian Games took place from 28 November to 3 December 1982 at Pragati Maidan, New Delhi, India.

A boxer may win by knockout or by points with 5 judges scoring each round. The boxer with the higher score from a majority of the judges is the winner.

== Schedule ==
All times are Indian Standard Time (UTC+05:30)

Date	Time	Event
Sunday, 28 November 1982	15:00	Quarterfinals
Wednesday, 1 December 1982	15:00	Semifinals
Friday, 3 December 1982	15:00	Final

== Results ==
Legend

- KO — Won by knockout

Quarterfinals
Kaur Singh (IND)	5
Abdul Salam (PAK)	0
So Bae-won (KOR)	KO
Jayasena Silva (SRI)

Semifinals
Ismail Khalil (IRQ)	5
Sambuugiin Khicheengui (MGL)	0
Kaur Singh (IND)	5
So Bae-won (KOR)	0

Final
Ismail Khalil (IRQ)	0
Kaur Singh (IND)	5
