= Boxing at the 1982 Asian Games – Men's 75 kg =

Boxing competitions

Men's 75 kg at the 1982 Asian Games
- Venue: Pragati Maidan
- Date: 29 November – 3 December 1982
- Competitors: 6 from 6 nations

Medalists
gold medal	Lee Nam-eui	South Korea
silver medal	Rajendra Kumar Puneda	India
bronze medal	Ahmad Al-Rabee	Kuwait
bronze medal	Muzaffar Ahmed	Pakistan

The men's middleweight (75 kilograms) event at the 1982 Asian Games took place from 29 November to 3 December 1982 at Pragati Maidan, New Delhi, India.

A boxer may win by knockout or by points with 5 judges scoring each round. The boxer with the higher score from a majority of the judges is the winner.

== Schedule ==
All times are Indian Standard Time (UTC+05:30)

Date	Time	Event
Monday, 29 November 1982	15:00	Quarterfinals
Wednesday, 1 December 1982	15:00	Semifinals
Friday, 3 December 1982	15:00	Final

== Results ==
Legend

- KO — Won by knockout
- RSC — Won by referee stop contest

Quarterfinals
Muzaffar Ahmed (PAK)	RSC
Saadisa Kamar (SAU)
Theera Daengsopa (THA)	2
Rajendra Kumar Puneda (IND)	3

Semifinals
Lee Nam-eui (KOR)	KO
Ahmad Al-Rabee (KUW)
Muzaffar Ahmed (PAK)
Rajendra Kumar Puneda (IND)	RSC

Final
Lee Nam-eui (KOR)	4
Rajendra Kumar Puneda (IND)	1
