= Boxing at the 1982 Asian Games – Men's 71 kg =

Boxing competitions

Men's 71 kg at the 1982 Asian Games
- Venue: Pragati Maidan
- Date: 29 November – 3 December 1982
- Competitors: 7 from 7 nations

Medalists
gold medal	Lee Hae-jung	South Korea
silver medal	Imad Idriss	Syria
bronze medal	Muhammad Niaz	Pakistan
bronze medal	Muluk Singh	India

The men's light middleweight (71 kilograms) event at the 1982 Asian Games took place from 29 November to 3 December 1982 at Pragati Maidan, New Delhi, India.

A boxer may win by knockout or by points with 5 judges scoring each round. The boxer with the higher score from a majority of the judges is the winner.

== Schedule ==
All times are Indian Standard Time (UTC+05:30)

Date	Time	Event
Monday, 29 November 1982	15:00	Quarterfinals
Wednesday, 1 December 1982	15:00	Semifinals
Friday, 3 December 1982	15:00	Final

== Results ==
Legend

- KO — Won by knockout
- RSC — Won by referee stop contest

Quarterfinals
Satan Kanchanaprasert (THA)	0
Lee Hae-jung (KOR)	5
Ahmad Jumah (KUW)
Muluk Singh (IND)	KO
Sheikh Bin Shuaib Awad (ADE)
Imad Idriss (SYR)	KO

Semifinals
Muhammad Niaz (PAK)
Lee Hae-jung (KOR)	RSC
Muluk Singh (IND)
Imad Idriss (SYR)	RSC

Final
Lee Hae-jung (KOR)	5
Imad Idriss (SYR)	0
