= Shooting at the 1982 Asian Games =

- Venue: Dr. Karni Singh Shooting Range

Shooting sports at the 1982 Asian Games was held in Dr. Karni Singh Shooting Range, New Delhi, India from 22 November to 2 December 1982.

Shooting comprised eleven individual and eleven team events, all open to both men and women. Each team could enter four shooters per event but only one score from each country counts in the individual competitions.

== Medalists ==
Event	Gold	Silver	Bronze
10 m air pistol	So Gil-san; North Korea	Wang Yifu; China	Prawat Kongcharoen; Thailand
10 m air pistol team	North Korea; Chon Tae-song; Kim Chi-man; Kim Gi-jong; So Gil-san	China; Chou Zhijian; Liu Jingsheng; Su Zhibo; Wang Yifu	Japan; Takayasu Eto; Junichi Haneda; Mamoru Inagaki; Fumihisa Semizuki
25 m center fire pistol	So Gil-san; North Korea	Vichit Chiewvej; Thailand	Deng Zening; China
25 m center fire pistol team	North Korea; Kim Chi-man; Kim Su-il; Nam Son-u; So Gil-san	China; Deng Zening; He Yueming; Li Zhongqi; Su Zhibo	Thailand; Vichit Chiewvej; Chana Jotikasthira; Opas Ruengpanyawut; Somchai Tongsak
25 m rapid fire pistol	So Gil-san; North Korea	Park Jong-kil; South Korea	Nguyễn Quốc Cường; Vietnam
25 m rapid fire pistol team	China; Cheng Zhongping; Du Xuean; Li Zhongqi; Liu Mingjun	North Korea; Ho Song-guk; Kim Su-il; Nam Son-u; So Gil-san	South Korea; Kim Woo-sik; Kim Yong-chul; Park Jong-kil; Yang Chung-yul
25 m standard pistol	Park Jong-kil; South Korea	Sharad Chauhan; India	Deng Zening; China
25 m standard pistol team	Japan; Hiroyuki Akatsuka; Satoshi Fujita; Chiyokatsu Kimura; Hideo Nonaka	China; Deng Zening; Du Xuean; Leng Shubin; Li Zhongqi	South Korea; Jang Dai-un; Kim Woo-sik; Park Jong-kil; Yang Chung-yul
50 m pistol	So Gil-san; North Korea	Shigetoshi Tashiro; Japan	Wang Yifu; China
50 m pistol team	North Korea; Chon Tae-song; Kim Chi-man; Kim Gi-jong; So Gil-san	China; Chou Zhijian; Liu Jingsheng; Su Zhibo; Wang Yifu	Japan; Takayasu Eto; Chikafumi Hirai; Mamoru Inagaki; Shigetoshi Tashiro
10 m air rifle	Wu Xiaoxuan; China	Kim Dong-gil; North Korea	Hiroyuki Nakajo; Japan
10 m air rifle team	China; Pang Liqin; Wang Shaobo; Wu Xiaoxuan; Zhang Kezhong	Japan; Akio Ito; Ryohei Koba; Kaoru Matsuo; Hiroyuki Nakajo	North Korea; Hong Gwang-sik; Kim Dong-gil; Kim Gyong-ho; Kim Yun-sob
50 m rifle prone	Yuji Ogawa; Japan	Gombosürengiin Ganzorig; Mongolia	Jose Medina; Philippines
50 m rifle prone team	Mongolia; Sangidorjiin Adilbish; Sain-Eriin Enkhjargal; Gombosürengiin Ganzorig; Mendbayaryn Jantsankhorloo	Japan; Norito Chosa; Kunio Hayashi; Kaoru Matsuo; Yuji Ogawa	South Korea; Kwak Jung-hoon; Park Young-sin; Seo Jang-woon; Yoon Deok-ha
50 m rifle 3 positions	Yoon Deok-ha; South Korea	Zhang Kezhong; China	Kim Yun-sob; North Korea
50 m rifle 3 positions team	China; Jin Dongxiang; Lin Bo; Qiu Bo; Zhang Kezhong	South Korea; Kim Joon-young; Kwon Taek-yul; Seo Jang-woon; Yoon Deok-ha	North Korea; Hong Gwang-sik; Kim Dong-gil; Kim Gyong-ho; Kim Yun-sob
50 m standard rifle 3 positions	Yoon Deok-ha; South Korea	Kaoru Matsuo; Japan	Pang Liqin; China
50 m standard rifle 3 positions team	China; Jin Dongxiang; Lin Bo; Pang Liqin; Qi Feng	South Korea; Kim Joon-young; Kwon Taek-yul; Seo Jang-woon; Yoon Deok-ha	Japan; Kaoru Matsuo; Hiroyuki Nakajo; Kimihiko Oura; Miyu Takeda
Trap	Kazumi Watanabe; Japan	Yu Haiquan; China	Randhir Singh; India
Trap team	China; Li Jinglong; Yu Haiquan; Zhang Gang; Zhang Huiqun	India; Pranab Kumar Roy; Gurbir Singh; Karni Singh; Randhir Singh	Japan; Motoharu Hirano; Masao Obara; Akira Umezu; Kazumi Watanabe
Skeet	Zhu Changfu; China	Ma Il-nam; North Korea	Kim Ki-woon; South Korea
Skeet team	China; Guo Li; Jin Yueqing; Yue Ming; Zhu Changfu	North Korea; Ma Il-nam; Ra Sang-uk; Ri Jong; Sin Nam-ho	Japan; Tsugio Hata; Mikio Itakura; Toshitsugu Takafuji; Tomoya Yamashita

== Medal table ==
Rank	Nation	Gold	Silver	Bronze	Total
1	China (CHN)	8	7	4	19
2	North Korea (PRK)	7	4	3	14
3	Japan (JPN)	3	4	6	13
4	South Korea (KOR)	3	3	4	10
5	Mongolia (MGL)	1	1	0	2
6	India (IND)	0	2	1	3
7	Thailand (THA)	0	1	2	3
8	Philippines (PHI)	0	0	1	1
8	Vietnam (VIE)	0	0	1	1
Totals (9 entries)		22	22	22	66
