= János Váradi =

Hungarian boxer (born 1961)

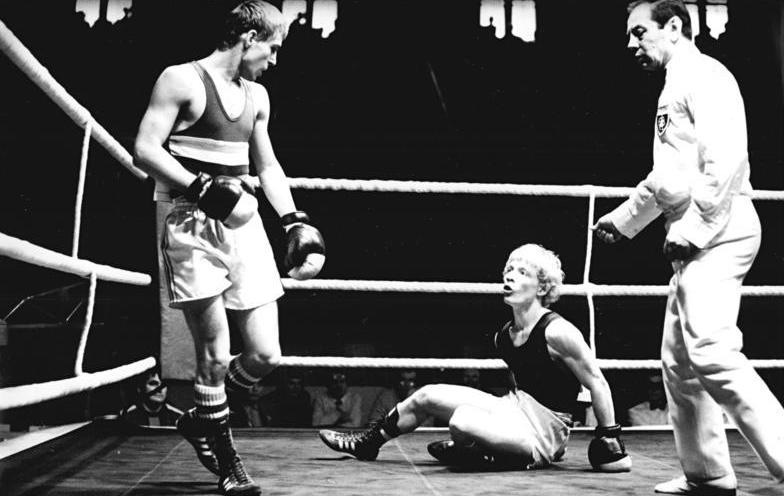
- János Váradi going to the neutral corner as East German Klaus-Dieter Kirchstein receiving a ten-count after being knocked down

Personal information
- Full name: Váradi János
- Nationality: Hungary
- Born: 28 February 1961 (age 65) Kemecse
- Height: 1.64 m (5 ft 5 in)
- Weight: 51 kg (112 lb)

Sport
- Sport: Boxing
- Weight class: Flyweight
- Club: Nyíregyházi Vasutas SC; Debreceni Munkás Vasutas SC
Medal record
Olympic Games
Bronze medal – third place	1980 Moscow	Flyweight
World championships
Bronze medal – third place	1986 Reno	Flyweight kg
Friendship Games
Bronze medal – third place	1984 Havana	Flyweight
European Amateur Championships
Silver medal – second place	1983 Varna	Flyweight
Silver medal – second place	1987 Turin	Flyweight
Silver medal – second place	1989 Athens	Flyweight

János Váradi (born 28 February 1961 in Kemecse, Szabolcs-Szatmár-Bereg) is a retired Hungarian boxer, who won the bronze medal in the flyweight division (– 51 kg) at the 1980 Summer Olympics. He also captured the silver medals at the 1987 and 1989 European Amateur Boxing Championships.

== Professional career ==
Váradi turned pro in 1990 and retired shortly thereafter, in 1991. His record was 5-0-0 with one no contest.

== Olympic Games ==
- 1980 Moscow Olympic Results - Boxed as a Flyweight (51 kg)
  - Round of 16 - Defeated Rabi Raj Thapa (Nepal) referee stopped contest in first round
  - Quarterfinals - Defeated Daniel Radu (Romania) by decision, 4–1
  - Semifinals - Lost to Viktor Miroshnichenko (Soviet Union) by decision, 1-4 (was awarded bronze medal)
- 1988 Seoul Olympic Results - Boxed as a Flyweight (51 kg)
  - Round of 64 - bye
  - Round of 32 - Defeated Roberto Jalnaiz (Philippines) by decision, 4–1
  - Round of 16 - Lost to Andreas Tews (East Germany) by decision, 0-5
