= Tennis at the 1982 Asian Games =

- Venue: R. K. Khanna Tennis Complex
- Dates: 22 November – 4 December 1982

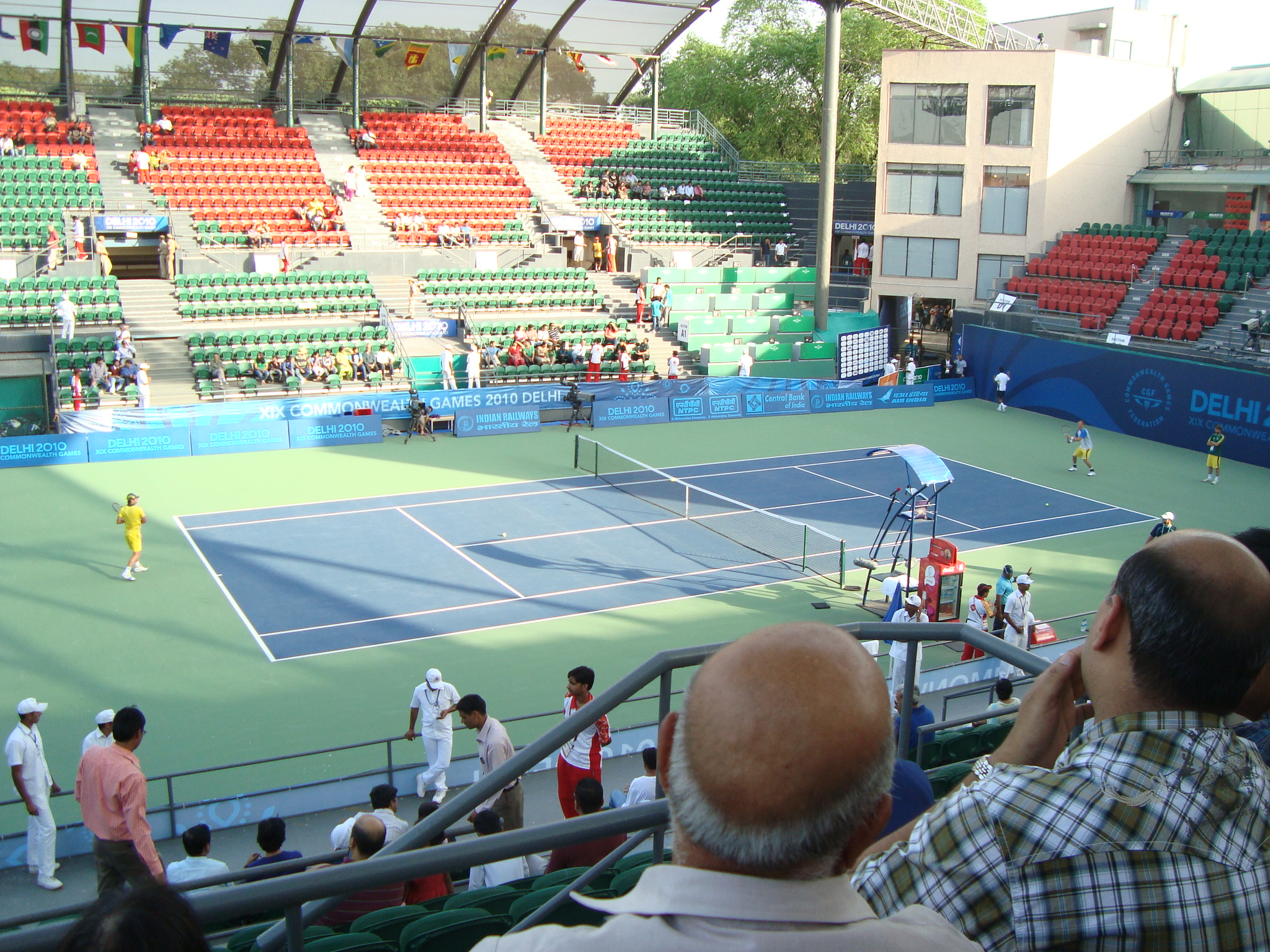
Centre court of R K Khanna Tennis Complex, as it appears today

Tennis competitions at the 1982 Asian Games in Delhi were held from 22 November to 4 December 1982 at the R. K. Khanna Tennis Complex in New Delhi, India.

South Korea dominated the competition winning four gold medals.

== Medalists ==
Event	Gold	Silver	Bronze
Men's singles	Yustedjo Tarik; Indonesia	Kim Choon-ho; South Korea	Liu Shuhua; China
Men's doubles	South Korea; Kim Choon-ho; Lee Woo-ryong	South Korea; Song Dong-wook; Jeon Yeong-dae	China; Liu Shuhua; Ma Keqin
Men's team	Indonesia; Hadiman; Yustedjo Tarik; Donald Wailan-Walalangi; Tintus Arianto Wibowo	India; Nandan Bal; Enrico Piperno; Jayant Rikhye; Srinivasan Vasudevan	China; Liu Shuhua; Ma Keqin; You Wei
Women's singles	Etsuko Inoue; Japan	Kim Soo-ok; South Korea	Yu Liqiao; China
Women's doubles	South Korea; Shin Soon-ho; Kim Nam-sook	Japan; Junko Kimura; Kazuko Ito	Japan; Masako Yanagi; Etsuko Inoue
Women's team	South Korea; Kim Nam-sook; Kim Soo-ok; Seol Min-kyung; Shin Soon-ho	China; Duan Lilan; Wang Ping; Yu Liqiao; Zhu Xiaoyun	Japan; Etsuko Inoue; Kazuko Ito; Junko Kimura; Masako Yanagi
Mixed doubles	South Korea; Kim Choon-ho; Shin Soon-ho	Japan; Ichiro Nakanishi; Etsuko Inoue	Japan; Yoshitomo Onishi; Masako Yanagi

== Medal table ==
Rank	Nation	Gold	Silver	Bronze	Total
1	South Korea (KOR)	4	3	0	7
2	Indonesia (INA)	2	0	0	2
3	Japan (JPN)	1	2	3	6
4	China (CHN)	0	1	4	5
5	India (IND)	0	1	0	1
Totals (5 entries)		7	7	7	21
