= Hugh Russell =

Irish boxer (1959–2023)

Personal information
- Other names: Little Red
- Nationality: Irish
- Born: 15 December 1959 Belfast, Northern Ireland
- Died: 13 October 2023 (aged 63)
- Height: 163 cm (5 ft 4 in)
- Weight: 48 kg (106 lb)

Boxing career
- Weight class: Flyweight; Bantamweight
- Stance: Orthodox

Boxing record
- Total fights: 19
- Wins: 17
- Win by KO: 8
- Losses: 2
Medal record
Men's Boxing
Olympic Games
Representing Ireland
Bronze medal – third place	1980 Moscow	Flyweight
Commonwealth Games
Representing Northern Ireland
Bronze medal – third place	1978 Edmonton	Flyweight

Hugh Russell (15 December 1959 – 13 October 2023) was a Northern Irish professional boxer from the New Lodge area of Belfast who competed from 1981 to 1985. He held the British bantamweight title in 1983 and flyweight title from 1984 to 1985. As an amateur, he won bronze medals at the 1978 Commonwealth Games and the 1980 Summer Olympics, both in the flyweight division.

== 1980 Olympic results ==
Below are the results of Hugh Russell, an Irish flyweight boxer who competed at the 1980 Moscow Olympics:

- Round of 32: Defeated Samir Khiniab (Iraq) on points, 5-0
- Round of 16: Defeated Emmanuel Mlundwa (Tanzania) on points, 5-0
- Quarterfinal: Defeated Yo Ryon-Sik (North Korea) on points, 3-2
- Semifinal: Lost to Peter Lessov (Bulgaria) on points, 0-5.

== Professional career ==
Known as "Little Red", Russell turned pro in 1981 and won two British titles in bantamweight and flyweight. He was the first boxer to win a British title at both divisions in that order.

In October 1982 he defeated Davy Larmour at the Ulster Hall to win the Irish Bantamweight title. The fight was also a final eliminator for the British title.

An iconic image of Russell reaching through the ropes to kiss his mother, Eileen, after winning the fight, appears in photographer Brendan Murphy's book Eyewitness.

In January 1983, he fought in the last 15-round British title fight, against reigning bantamweight champion John Feeney. The fight was stopped in the 13th round when the referee disqualified Feeney for persistent misuse of the head.

Russell retired in 1985 as undefeated British flyweight champion after securing a Lonsdale Belt.

== Death ==
Russell, who worked as a photographer for many years for the Irish News, died on 13 October 2023 at the age of 63.

== See also ==
- List of British bantamweight boxing champions
- List of British flyweight boxing champions

== Sources ==
- Evans, Hilary; Gjerde, Arild; Heijmans, Jeroen; Mallon, Bill; et al. "Hugh Russell". Olympics at Sports-Reference.com. Sports Reference LLC. Archived from the original on 13 October 2012.
