= Kim Nam-sook =

South Korean tennis player

- Country (sports): South Korea
- Born: 28 October 1958 (age 66)
Medal record
Asian Games
Gold medal – first place	1982 New Delhi	Women's Doubles
Gold medal – first place	1982 New Delhi	Women's Team
Silver medal – second place	1978 Bangkok	Women's Team

Kim Nam-sook (born 28 October 1958) is a South Korean former tennis player.

Kim featured in seven Federation Cup ties for South Korea, from 1977 to 1979. She had a Federation Cup win over Japan's Naoko Sato in 1977, who earlier in the year had reached the Australian Open quarter-finals.

At the 1982 Asian Games, which were held in New Delhi, Kim won two gold medals for South Korea. She won one gold partnering Shin Soon-ho in the women's doubles and the other in the team event.
