= Muhammad Ali in India =

Muhammad Ali visits in India

Muhammad Ali visited India on multiple occasions to participate in exhibition boxing matches, to visit schools and orphanages supported by his foundation, and for other private visits.

== Exhibition boxing ==
In January 1980 Muhammad Ali visited India, reportedly at the behest of Rajiv Gandhi, to participate in exhibition boxing matches in Delhi, Bombay, and Chennai.

=== Delhi ===
In Delhi, on January 27, 1980, Ali sparred with Kaur Singh, the Indian national heavyweight champion, for a four-round exhibition match. More than 50,000 people attended the match. According to Kaur Singh:

Us de mukke bahut hi dumdar si (His punches had great power).I clearly remember that jab, his famous jab. It seemed to come out of nowhere. He used his right hand to block my punches, and his counter punch to hit me. His speed was amazing; not once during those four rounds did the speed drop...He was shorter than me but his ring craft and movement took him out of my reach.

A veteran journalist who witnessed the fight claimed that Ali hardly threw any punches at Kaur Singh during the match, spending the time chit-chatting with youngsters who had collected around the ring.

=== Madras ===
Ali came to Madras and held hands with MGR. Crowds thronged Chennai's Nehru stadium to witness the legend in action in 1980. Organised by Tamil Nadu State Amateur Boxing Association and Apeejay, the exhibition bout that saw Ali taking on former heavy weight champion Jimmy Ellis.

== Social interactions in India ==
- According to a February 1980 report published in The Telegraph:
  Muhammad Ali boxer spectacular, set yet another record on his first visit to India - he became the first boxer to kiss the Indian Prime Minister Mrs Indira Gandhi. As soon as he met Mrs Gandhi, Ali jumped up, enveloped her in a bear hug and gave a loud smack on her left cheek. Blushing, an extremely flustered Mrs Gandhi yet managed to keep her cool and smiled back in acknowledgment.
- In a press conference organized in Bombay in January 1980, Ali stated: "I am happy to be in Bombay; I was driving here from the airport and came via Muhammad Ali Road—you have already named a road after me."
