= Go Jin-won =

South Korean wrestler (born 1956)

Personal information
- Nationality: South Korean
- Born: 26 October 1956 (age 69)

Sport
- Sport: Wrestling
Medal record
Men's freestyle wrestling
Representing South Korea
Asian Games
Silver medal – second place	1982 Delhi	74 kg
Bronze medal – third place	1978 Bangkok	68 kg

Go Jin-won (born 26 October 1956) is a South Korean wrestler. He competed in the men's freestyle 68 kg at the 1976 Summer Olympics.
