= Hiromi Isozaki =

Hiromi Isozaki may refer to:

- Hiromi Isozaki (sprinter) (磯崎 公美; born 1965), Japanese sprint athlete
- Hiromi Isozaki (磯崎 浩美; born 1975), maiden name of Japanese footballer Hiromi Ikeda
- Hiromi Isozaki (磯崎 公美), character in the anime series Shingu: Secret of the Stellar Wars
