= Boxing at the 1980 Summer Olympics – Flyweight =

Boxing competitions

Flyweight boxing at the Games of the XXII Olympiad
- Venue: Olympiysky Sports Complex
- Date: 22 July – 2 August 1980
- Competitors: 22 from 22 nations

Medalists
1st place, gold medalist(s)		Petar Lesov	Bulgaria
2nd place, silver medalist(s)		Viktor Miroshnichenko	Soviet Union
3rd place, bronze medalist(s)		Hugh Russell	Ireland
3rd place, bronze medalist(s)		János Váradi	Hungary

The flyweight boxing competition at the 1980 Olympic Games in Moscow was held from 22 July to 2 August at the Olympiysky Sports Complex. 22 boxers from 22 nations competed.

== Schedule ==
Date	Time	Round
Tuesday, 22 July 1980	12:00; 18:00	Round of 32
Saturday, 26 July 1980	12:00; 18:00	Round of 16
Tuesday, 29 July 1980	19:00	Quarterfinals
Thursday, 31 July 1980	19:00	Semifinals
Saturday, 2 August 1980	15:00	Final

== Results ==
=== Finals ===
Semifinals
Viktor Miroshnichenko (URS)	4
János Váradi (HUN)	1
Petar Lesov (BUL)	5
Hugh Russell (IRL)	0

Final
Viktor Miroshnichenko (URS)
Petar Lesov (BUL)	RSC

=== Top half ===
Round of 32

Round of 16
Jorge Hernández (CUB)	1
Viktor Miroshnichenko (URS)	4
Webbyego Mwangu (ZAM)	0
Henryk Średnicki (POL)	5
Daniel Radu (ROU)	4
Keith Wallace (GBR)	1
Rabi Raj Thapa (NEP)
János Váradi (HUN)	RSC

Quarterfinals
Viktor Miroshnichenko (URS)	5
Henryk Średnicki (POL)	0
Daniel Radu (ROU)	1
János Váradi (HUN)	4

Semifinals
Viktor Miroshnichenko (URS)	4
János Váradi (HUN)	1

=== Bottom half ===
Round of 32
Onofre Ramírez (NCA)	0
Petar Lesov (BUL)	5
Barry Aguibou (GUI)	DSQ
Hassan Sherif (ETH)
Talal El-Chawa (SYR)
Emmanuel Mlundwa (TAN)	RSC
Hugh Russell (IRL)	5
Samir Khenyab (IRQ)	0
Amala Dass (IND)	0
Jo Ryon-sik (PRK)	5
Ramon Guevara (VEN)	5
Nyamyn Narantuyaa (MGL)	0

Round of 16
Alberto Mercado (PUR)
Gilberto Román (MEX)	RSC
Petar Lesov (BUL)	5
Hassan Sherif (ETH)	0
Emmanuel Mlundwa (TAN)	0
Hugh Russell (IRL)	5
Yo Ryon-sik (PRK)	4
Ramon Guevara (VEN)	1

Quarterfinals
Gilberto Román (MEX)	1
Petar Lesov (BUL)	4
Hugh Russell (IRL)	3
Yo Ryon-sik (PRK)	2

Semifinals
Petar Lesov (BUL)	5
Hugh Russell (IRL)	0
