= Farhan Jassim =

Iraqi freestyle wrestler

Farhan Jassim Mohammed
Personal information
- Born: 1957 (age 68–69) Iraq

Sport
- Sport: Freestyle wrestling
Medal record
Representing Iraq
Men's freestyle wrestling
Asian Games
Silver medal – second place	1982 New Delhi	+100 kg
Silver medal – second place	1986 Seoul	130 kg
Men's Greco-Roman wrestling
Asian Championships
Gold medal – first place	1987 Mumbai	130 kg

Farhan Jassim Mohammed (Arabic: فرحان جاسم محمد; born 1957) is a retired freestyle wrestler from Iraq. He represented his country at the 1988 Summer Olympics.
