= 1982 Asian Games medal table =

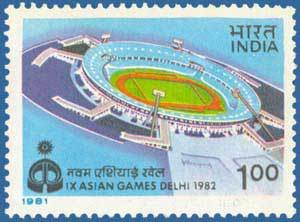
- A 1981 Indian commemorative postage stamp illustrating the Jawaharlal Nehru Stadium for the 1982 Asian Games.
- Location: New Delhi, India

Highlights
- Most gold medals: China 61
- Most total medals: CHN and Japan 153 each
- Medalling NOCs: 23

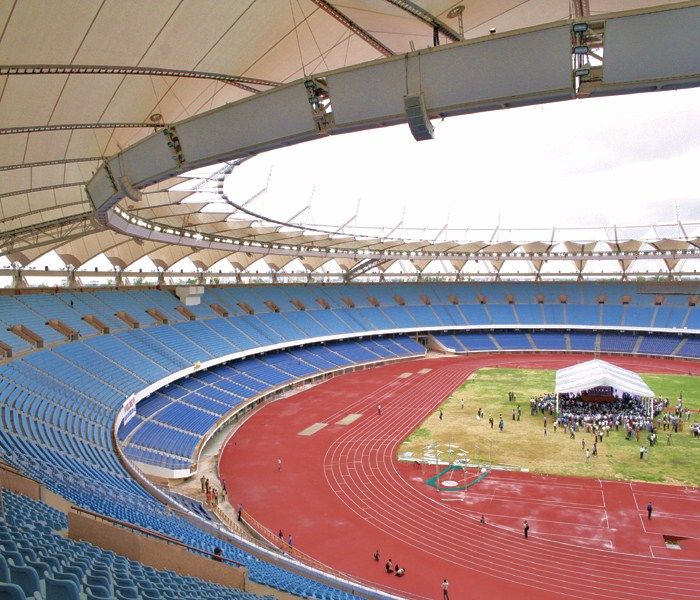
Jawaharlal Nehru Stadium as it appeared in July 2010, was the main venue for the 1982 Asiad.

The 1982 Asian Games (also known as the IX Asiad)^{[a]} was a multi-sport event held in Delhi, India, from 12 November to 4 December 1982. A total of 3,411 athletes from 33 National Olympic Committees (NOCs) participated in these games, competing in 147 events in 21 sports and 22 disciplines. The number of participating countries was the greatest in Asian Games history. Sport events of handball, equestrian, rowing and golf were included for the first time; while fencing and bowling were excluded. This medal table ranks the participating NOCs by the number of gold medals won by their athletes.

Athletes from 23 participating NOCs won at least one medal; athletes from 16 of these NOCs secured at least one gold. Athletes from China won 61 gold medals, the most of any nation at these Asiad, and led the gold-medal count for the first time in their Asiad history. Japan had won the greatest number of medals in previous editions of the Games. China first competed at the Asian Games in 1974, in Tehran, where it finished third. Athletes from both China and Japan won the most total medals with 153. China has secured the top medal spot in every Asiad since 1982. South Korea finished third in total medals. North Korea finished fifth in total medals, and fourth in the gold-medal count. Host nation India finished the games with 57 medals overall (13 gold, 19 silver and 25 bronze, its best performance since 1951), in fifth spot in terms of total gold medals.

== Medal table ==
The ranking in this table is consistent with International Olympic Committee convention in its published medal tables. By default, the table is ordered by the number of gold medals the athletes from a nation have won (in this context, a nation is an entity represented by a National Olympic Committee). The number of silver medals is taken into consideration next and then the number of bronze medals. If nations are still tied, equal ranking is given; they are listed alphabetically by IOC country code.

A total of 614 medals (199 gold, 200 silver and 215 bronze) were awarded. The total number of bronze medals is greater than the total number of gold or silver medals because two bronze medals were awarded per event in three sports: badminton, boxing and table tennis (except the team events). Additionally there was a tie for the silver medal in the women's 200 metre medley in swimming and no bronze was awarded. In gymnastics events many shared medals were awarded; a three-way tie in men's pommel horse and a tie in men's ring for first place, meant that no silvers were awarded for those events. Three gymnasts in men's parallel bars and two each in men's floor, women's uneven bar and women's floor tied for second place, thus no bronzes were awarded in these events and also no silver was awarded for men's parallel bars. A tie for third in men's vault meant that two bronze medals were awarded.

* Host nation (India)

Rank	Nation	Gold	Silver	Bronze	Total
1	China (CHN)	61	51	41	153
2	Japan (JPN)	57	52	44	153
3	South Korea (KOR)	28	28	37	93
4	North Korea (PRK)	17	19	20	56
5	India (IND)*	13	19	25	57
6	Indonesia (INA)	4	4	7	15
7	Iran (IRN)	4	4	4	12
8	Pakistan (PAK)	3	3	5	11
9	Mongolia (MGL)	3	3	1	7
10	Philippines (PHI)	2	3	9	14
11	Iraq (IRQ)	2	3	4	9
12	Thailand (THA)	1	5	4	10
13	Kuwait (KUW)	1	3	3	7
14	Syria (SYR)	1	1	1	3
15	Malaysia (MAL)	1	0	3	4
16	Singapore (SIN)	1	0	2	3
17	Afghanistan (AFG)	0	1	0	1
17	Lebanon (LIB)	0	1	0	1
19	Bahrain (BRN)	0	0	1	1
19	Hong Kong (HKG)	0	0	1	1
19	Qatar (QAT)	0	0	1	1
19	Saudi Arabia (SAU)	0	0	1	1
19	Vietnam (VIE)	0	0	1	1
Totals (23 entries)		199	200	215	614

== Medal distribution ==
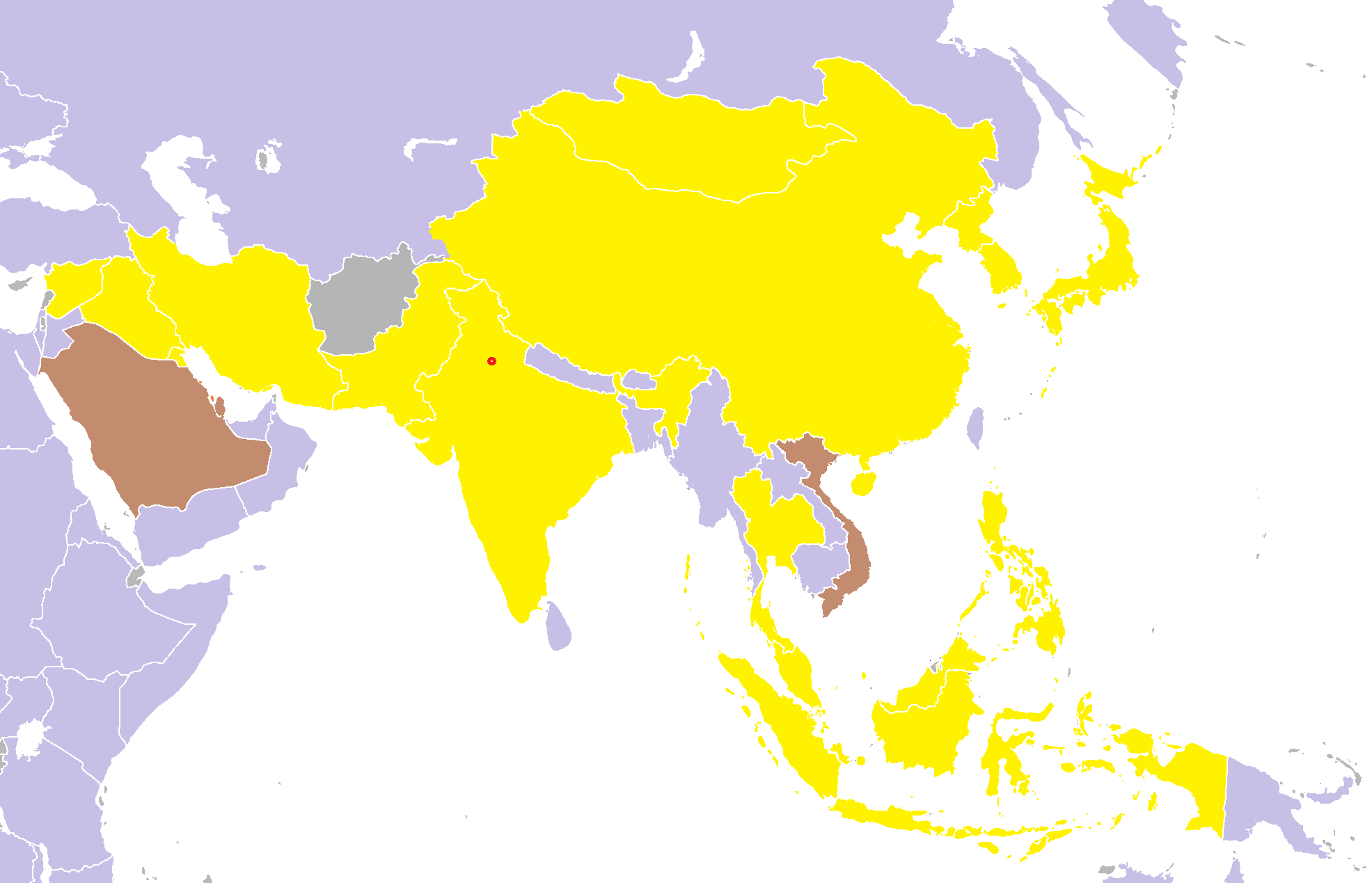
Participating NOCs with: at least one gold medal (*); at least one silver medal (†); at least one bronze medal (^). Red circle: host city.
1. Afghanistan
2. Bahrain
3. China
4. North Korea
5. Hong Kong
6. India
7. Indonesia
8. Iran
9. Iraq
10. Japan
11. South Korea
12. Kuwait
13. Lebanon
14. Malaysia
15. Mongolia
16. Pakistan
17. Philippines
18. Qatar
19. Saudi Arabia
20. Singapore
21. Syria
22. Thailand
23. Vietnam

== Notes and references ==
Notes

- ^{a} "IX Asiad" was the general term used by the Indian Government and Special Organising Committee (SOC) formed for the 1982 Asian Games, which was succeeded by the Sports Authority of India (SAI).
