= Dashdorjiin Tserentogtokh =

Mongolian wrestler

Medal record

Men's freestyle wrestling

Representing Mongolia

Asian Games
Gold medal – first place	1974 Tehran	90 kg
Silver medal – second place	1982 New Delhi	100 kg

Dashdorjiin Tserentogtokh (11 August 1951 – 26 August 2015) was a Mongolian former wrestler who competed in the 1976 Summer Olympics and in the 1980 Summer Olympics.
