= Iran at the 1982 Asian Games =

- IOC code: IRN
- NOC: National Olympic Committee of the Islamic Republic of Iran

in New Delhi
- Competitors: 43 in 4 sports
- Flag bearer: Reza Soukhtehsaraei
- Medals Ranked 7th: Gold 4 Silver 4 Bronze 4 Total 12

Asian Games appearances (overview)
- 1951; 1954; 1958; 1962; 1966; 1970; 1974; 1978; 1982; 1986; 1990; 1994; 1998; 2002; 2006; 2010; 2014; 2018; 2022; 2026

Iran participated in the 1982 Asian Games held in the capital city of New Delhi. This country is ranked 7th with only 4 gold medals in this edition of the Asiad.

== Medal summary ==
=== Medals by sport ===
Sport	Gold	Silver	Bronze	Total
Cycling road			2	2
Weightlifting	1	2		3
Wrestling	3	2	2	7
Total	4	4	4	12

=== Medalists ===
Medal	Name	Sport	Event
Gold	Ali Pakizehjam	Weightlifting	Men's 75 kg
Gold	Mohammad Hossein Mohebbi	Wrestling	Men's freestyle 74 kg
Gold	Mohammad Hassan Mohebbi	Wrestling	Men's freestyle 90 kg
Gold	Reza Soukhtehsaraei	Wrestling	Men's freestyle +100 kg
Silver	Mehran Eslampour	Weightlifting	Men's 90 kg
Silver	Ali Vadi	Weightlifting	Men's +110 kg
Silver	Mohammad Hossein Dabbaghi	Wrestling	Men's freestyle 52 kg
Silver	Askari Mohammadian	Wrestling	Men's freestyle 57 kg
Bronze	Ali Zangiabadi	Cycling road	Men's road race
Bronze	Mehrdad Afsharian; Abolfazl Khandaghi; Mohammad Ali Mohammadi; Ali Zangiabadi	Cycling road	Men's team time trial
Bronze	Ahmad Rezaei	Wrestling	Men's freestyle 62 kg
Bronze	Mahmoud Moradi Ganji	Wrestling	Men's freestyle 100 kg

== Results by event ==
=== Football ===
Men

Squad list	Preliminary round		Quarterfinal	Semifinal	Final	Rank
Squad list	Group D	Rank	Quarterfinal	Semifinal	Final	Rank
Behrouz Soltani; Mohammad Dadkan; Amir Marzoughi; Mehdi Dinvarzadeh; Mohammad Panjali; Mohammad Mayeli Kohan; Zia Arabshahi; Abbas Kargar; Hamid Derakhshan; Nasser Mohammadkhani; Reza Ahadi; Mohammad Naderi; Bijan Taheri; Amir Hossein Shahzeidi; Mahmoud Haghighian; Alireza Firouzi; Coach: Jalal Cheraghpour	Japan; L 0–1	2 Q	Kuwait; L 0–1	Did not advance		5
Behrouz Soltani; Mohammad Dadkan; Amir Marzoughi; Mehdi Dinvarzadeh; Mohammad Panjali; Mohammad Mayeli Kohan; Zia Arabshahi; Abbas Kargar; Hamid Derakhshan; Nasser Mohammadkhani; Reza Ahadi; Mohammad Naderi; Bijan Taheri; Amir Hossein Shahzeidi; Mahmoud Haghighian; Alireza Firouzi; Coach: Jalal Cheraghpour	South Yemen; W 2–0	2 Q	Kuwait; L 0–1	Did not advance		5
Behrouz Soltani; Mohammad Dadkan; Amir Marzoughi; Mehdi Dinvarzadeh; Mohammad Panjali; Mohammad Mayeli Kohan; Zia Arabshahi; Abbas Kargar; Hamid Derakhshan; Nasser Mohammadkhani; Reza Ahadi; Mohammad Naderi; Bijan Taheri; Amir Hossein Shahzeidi; Mahmoud Haghighian; Alireza Firouzi; Coach: Jalal Cheraghpour	South Korea; W 1–0	2 Q	Kuwait; L 0–1	Did not advance		5

=== Weightlifting ===
Athlete	Event	Snatch		Clean & Jerk		Total	
Athlete	Event	Result	Rank	Result	Rank	Result	Rank
Shahram Yousefi	Men's 67.5 kg	130.0	4	165.0	4	295.0	5
Ali Pakizehjam	Men's 75 kg	155.0	1	185.0	1	340.0	1st place, gold medalist(s)
Bijan Rezaei	Men's 82.5 kg	147.5	3	180.0	6	327.5	6
Ardeshir Shamsi	Men's 82.5 kg	140.0	7	187.5	3	327.5	4
Mehran Eslampour	Men's 90 kg	150.0	3	185.0	2	335.0	2nd place, silver medalist(s)
Ali Moradi	Men's 90 kg	145.0	6	182.5	4	327.5	4
Azar Majidi	Men's 100 kg	NM	—	187.5	2	—	—
Amir Hossein Pourrezaei	Men's 110 kg	150.0	2	NM	—	—	—
Taghi Rouhani	Men's 110 kg	145.0	4	185.0	4	330.0	4
Ali Vadi	Men's +110 kg	155.0	2	200.0	2	355.0	2nd place, silver medalist(s)

=== Wrestling ===
Men's freestyle

Athlete	Event	Rank
Majid Torkan	48 kg	4
Mohammad Hossein Dabbaghi	52 kg	Silver medal
Askari Mohammadian	57 kg	Silver medal
Ahmad Rezaei	62 kg	Bronze medal
Hassan Hamidi	68 kg	5
Mohammad Hossein Mohebbi	74 kg	Gold medal
Mahmoud Kadkhodaei	82 kg	EL
Mohammad Hassan Mohebbi	90 kg	Gold medal
Mahmoud Moradi Ganji	100 kg	Bronze medal
Reza Soukhtehsaraei	+100 kg	Gold medal
