= Isaac Amaldas =

Indian boxer

Personal information
- Nationality: Indian

Sport
- Sport: Boxing

Isaac Amaldas is an Indian boxer. He competed in the men's flyweight event at the 1980 Summer Olympics. At the 1980 Summer Olympics, he lost in his first fight to Jo Ryon-sik of North Korea.
