= Keith Wallace (boxer) =

English boxer

Personal information
- Nationality: English
- Born: 29 March 1961 Prescot, England
- Died: 4 January 2000 (aged 38)
- Height: 5 ft 6 in (1.68 m)
- Weight: fly/super fly/bantam/super bantam/featherweight

Boxing career

Boxing record
- Total fights: 25
- Wins: 20 (KO 14)
- Losses: 5 (KO 4)

Keith Wallace (29 March 1961 – 4 January 2000 ) born in Prescot was an English amateur flyweight and professional fly/super fly/bantam/super bantam/featherweight boxer of the 1970s, 1980s and 1990s, who as an amateur won the 1974 Amateur Boxing Association of England (ABAE) 33 kg Schools title, against Kelvin Smart (Newport) boxing out of the BICC ABC (Prescot), won the 1980 ABAE flyweight title, against Danny Flynn (Meadowbank ABC) boxing out of the St. Helens Star ABC, and won the 1981 ABAE flyweight title, against Dai Williams (Gelligaer BC) boxing out of the St. Helens Star ABC, and represented Great Britain at flyweight in the Boxing at the 1980 Summer Olympics, in Moscow, Soviet Union, losing to Daniel Radu of Romania.

== 1980 Olympic results ==
Below is the record of Keith Wallace, a British flyweight boxer who competed at the 1980 Moscow Olympics:

- Round of 32: bye
- Round of 16: lost to Daniel Radu (Romania) by decision, 1-4

== Professional boxing career ==
As a professional Wallace won the Commonwealth flyweight title, and was a challenger for the European Boxing Union (EBU) flyweight title against Antoine Montero. His professional fighting weight varied from 111 lb (50 kg; 7 st 13 lb), i.e. flyweight to 125 1/2 lb (56.9 kg; 8 st 13.5 lb), i.e. featherweight. Keith Wallace was managed by Frank Warren, and was Warren's first professional signing, Wallace won the Boxing Writers' Club Young Boxer of the Year, and died of cancer.

== Genealogical information ==
Keith Wallace was the son of Andrew Wallace (birth registered during January→March 1937 in Liverpool South district) and Ann (née Powell) (birth registered during January→March 1942 in Prescot district), and was the older brother of Catherine A. Wallace (birth registered during January→March 1962 in Prescot district).
