= Padmini Thomas =

Indian athlete

Personal information
- Nationality: Indian

Sport
- Country: India
- Sport: Athletics
Medal record
Women's athletics
Representing India
Asian Games
Silver medal – second place	1982 New Delhi	4×100 m
Bronze medal – third place	1982 New Delhi	400 m

Padmini Thomas is an Indian athlete and a former president of the Kerala State Sports Council. She won a Silver medal in 4 × 100 m relay and a bronze medal in the 400 metres in the 1982 Asian Games. She is a recipient of the Arjuna Award.

Thomas was married to John Selvan, a former Indian athlete, who died on May 6, 2020, succumbing to the injuries sustained from a fall from the terrace of their home in Thiruvananthapuram. Her daughter, Diana John Selvan and son, Dany John Selvan, are both sports persons in their own right. In March 2024, Thomas joined BJP after leaving INC. On 20 November 2026, she left BJP.
