= Viktor Miroshnichenko =

Ukrainian boxer (1959–2025)

Personal information
- Born: 1 December 1959 Ukrainsk, Stalino Oblast, Ukrainian SSR, USSR
- Died: 6 December 2025 (aged 66)
Medal record
Men's Boxing
Representing the Soviet Union
Olympic Games
Silver medal – second place	1980 Moscow	Flyweight
World Amateur Championships
Silver medal – second place	1982 Munich	Bantamweight
European Amateur Championships
Gold medal – first place	1981 Tampere	Bantamweight

Viktor Miroshnichenko (Ukrainian: Віктор Володимирович Мірошніченко; 1 December 1959 – 6 December 2025) was a Ukrainian boxer, who represented the USSR at the 1980 Summer Olympics in Moscow, Soviet Union. There he won the silver medal in the flyweight division (– 51 kg), after being defeated in the final by Bulgaria's Petar Lesov. Two years later, he captured the silver medal at the World Championships in Munich, West Germany. Miroshnichenko trained at Dynamo in Donetsk. Miroshnichenko died on 6 December 2025, at the age of 66.

== 1980 Olympic results ==
Below are the results of Viktor Miroshnichenko, a flyweight boxer from the Soviet Union who competed at the 1980 Moscow Olympics:

- Round of 32: bye
- Round of 16: Defeated Jorge Hernández (Cuba) by decision, 4–1
- Quarterfinal: Defeated Henryk Średnicki (Poland) by decision, 5–0
- Semifinal: Defeated János Váradi (Hungary) by decision, 4–1
- Final: Lost to Petar Lesov (Bulgaria) referee stopped contest in round 2 (was awarded silver medal)

== Sources ==
- databaseOlympics
- sports-reference
