= Hassan Sherif =

Ethiopian boxer (born 1952)

Personal information
- Nationality: Ethiopian
- Born: 19 August 1952 (age 72)
- Height: 1.65 m (5 ft 5 in)
- Weight: 51 kg (112 lb)

Sport
- Sport: Boxing

Hassan Sherif (born 19 August 1952) is an Ethiopian boxer. He competed in the men's flyweight event at the 1980 Summer Olympics. At the 1980 Summer Olympics, he defeated Barry Aguibou of Guinea, before losing to Petar Lesov of Bulgaria.
