= Hiromi Isozaki (sprinter) =

Japanese sprinter (born 1965)

Medal record

Women's athletics

Representing Japan

Asian Games
Gold medal – first place	1982 New Delhi	200 m
Gold medal – first place	1982 New Delhi	400 m
Gold medal – first place	1982 New Delhi	4×100 m
Gold medal – first place	1982 New Delhi	4×400 m
Silver medal – second place	1986 Seoul	4×400 m
Bronze medal – third place	1986 Seoul	400 m

Asian Championships
Silver medal – second place	1985 Jakarta	4×400 m
Silver medal – second place	1987 Singapore	4×400 m
Bronze medal – third place	1987 Singapore	200 m

Hiromi "Kumi" Isozaki (Japanese: 磯崎 公美; born 20 March 1965) is a Japanese former track and field athlete who competed in sprinting events from 100 metres to 400 metres. She won four gold medals at the 1982 Asian Games, which she set three games records. She later won 400 m bronze at the 1986 Asian Games and a 200 metres bronze at the 1987 Asian Athletics Championships. She was also a three-time silver medallist in the 4×400 metres relay at continental level.

She was a ten-time winner at the Japan Championships in Athletics, seven of those coming in the 200 m. She was a Japanese record holder in the 200 m and 400 m with her bests of 24.00 seconds and 53.73 seconds, titles she held for nearly ten years. She was also a former Asian record holder in the 4×100 metres relay and 4×200 metres relay with the Japanese national team.

== Career ==
=== Early life and career ===
Born in Kanagawa Prefecture, she attended school in Odawara, then took junior high at Tateyama North High School in Yamakita. While there she was a keen volleyball player and her speed led the coach to suggest she try sprinting with the school track and field team. In 1982 she claimed a sprint triple crown in the 100 metres, 200 metres and 400 metres at the Japan National Scholastic Championships.

Isozaki established herself as the nation's top sprinter at a very early age. She won a 100 m/200 m double at the Japan Championships in Athletics in 1981 at age sixteen. The following year she won the 200 m national title in a championship record of 24.18 seconds. This improved the Japanese national record of Kaihara Sumiko (24.27). She later improved to 24 seconds flat and this would last as the record until 1992, when Kazue Kakinuma became the first Japanese woman under 24 seconds for the event.

=== 1982 Asian Games ===
She was picked for the Japanese women's team at the 1982 Asian Games in New Delhi and the seventeen-year-old Isozaki was one of the star performers of the tournament. She won the 200 m gold medal by beating P. T. Usha (India's own teenage sprint prodigy) by a tenth of a second and added another title with an Asian Games record time of 54.43 seconds in the women's 400 m. A 4×100 metres relay team of Emiko Konishi, Isozaki, Emi Akimoto and Junko Yoshida brought a third gold for her in an Asian record and games record time, and a fourth gold and third games record came in the 4×400 metres relay team, where she anchored the team of Hitomi Koshimoto, Yoshida and Izumi Takahata (also a national record).

She was the first woman to complete a 200 m/400 m double at the Asian Games (a feat P. T. Usha matched four years later) and was Japan's first individual women's 400 m champion. After the games Isozaki ran a national record in the 400 m of 53.73 seconds, making her the first Japanese woman to run the distance in less than 54 seconds. She remained the record holder for almost ten years, with Kazue Kakinuma again being the one to improve her standard in 1992.

=== Professional career ===
After graduating from high school she turned professional and signed a contract with Nike Japan. In the 1983 season she won her first 400 m title at the Japan Championships, but relinquished her 200 m title to Emiko Konishi. She regained her 200 m title in 1984 and was not defeated nationally in the event for another four years. Her win streak of five only came to an end in 1989 when Toshie Kitada took the crown. She was a prominent pick for the 1985 Asian Athletics Championships but was less successful that year. She placed last in eighth in the 200 m final, could only help the Japanese women to sixth in the 4×100 m relay, but did manage to come away with a silver in the 4×400 m relay, behind a P. T. Usha-led Indian team. In November that year she helped set an Asian record in the infrequently competed 4×200 metres relay. The team of Konishi, Etsuko Hara, Isozaki and Koshimoto ran a time of 1:35.90 minutes in Hamamatsu. This record stood for nearly thirty years, with a Chinese team finally beating it at the 2015 IAAF World Relays.

At the 1986 Asian Games the 21-year-old Isozaki was entered to defend all her titles. She ran her individual finals faster than she had done four years earlier, but the standard of women's sprinting in Asia had improved and this meant she was fifth in the 200 m and third in the 400 m. P. T. Usha succeeded Isozaki in both disciplines with another Indian, Shiny Abraham, finishing ahead of the Japanese sprinter in the 400 m. The Japanese short relay team fell to fifth in the rankings but the national long relay team remained competitive as Isozaki anchored home a quartet including Keiko Honda, Koshimoto and Ayako Arai to the silver medal behind the Indian women.

Isozaki won a 200 m/400 m double at the Japan Championships in 1987 – the first time a female athlete had done this feat since the longer sprint was introduced to the national program in 1962. The last international medals of her career came at the 1987 Asian Athletics Championships. She claimed a bronze in the 200 m, finishing behind Lydia de Vega of the Philippines and China's Pan Weixin. She ran the anchor leg for both the 4×100 and 4×400 m relay teams, coming sixth the former but managing a final silver medal in the latter.

She formally retired from competition at age 28.

== National titles ==
- Japan Championships in Athletics
  - 100 metres: 1981
  - 200 metres: 1981, 1982, 1984, 1985, 1986. 1987, 1988
  - 400 metres: 1983, 1987

== International competitions ==
Year	Competition	Venue	Position	Event	Notes
1982	Asian Games	New Delhi, India	1st	200 m	24.22
1982	Asian Games	New Delhi, India	1st	400 m	54.43 GR
1982	Asian Games	New Delhi, India	1st	4 × 100 m relay	45.13 GR
1982	Asian Games	New Delhi, India	1st	4 × 400 m relay	3:37.44 GR
1985	Asian Championships	Jakarta, Indonesia	8th	200 m	24.62w
1985	Asian Championships	Jakarta, Indonesia	6th	4 × 100 m relay	46.37
1985	Asian Championships	Jakarta, Indonesia	2nd	4 × 400 m relay	3:39.51
1986	Asian Games	Seoul, South Korea	5th	200 m	24.20
1986	Asian Games	Seoul, South Korea	3rd	400 m	53.76
1986	Asian Games	Seoul, South Korea	5th	4 × 100 m relay	46.30
1986	Asian Games	Seoul, South Korea	2nd	4 × 400 m relay	3:39.77
1987	Asian Championships	Singapore	3rd	200 m	24.18
1987	Asian Championships	Singapore	6th	4 × 100 m relay	46.72
1987	Asian Championships	Singapore	2nd	4 × 400 m relay	3:39.70

== See also ==
- List of 100 metres national champions (women)
