= Deanna Syme Tewari =

Indian track and field athlete (1939–2024)

Deanna Syme Tewari (1939 – 28 March 2024) was an Indian athlete from Bangalore in 1950s and early 1960s. She was the torch bearer for India in the 1982 Asian Games in New Delhi.

== Early life and education ==
Syme was born to Phyllis Syme and Cyril Syme in Bangalore. Both her parents were sprinters and she also took to sports as many of her family members were into sports. Her aunt Marjorie Suares took part in the 1951 Asian Games at Delhi and her uncle Arthur Suares was into boxing at the National level. She did her schooling at St. John's high school and St. Francis Xavier high school in Cleveland Town. Later, she did her college at Mount Carmel College. She taught history in Calcutta (now Kolkata) and returned to Bangalore and became a teacher at Sophia girls' high school. She then moved to Dubai in 1993 where she continued to teach English and was recognized for her dedication.

== Career ==
She started taking part in long jump during her school days and played the inter-university tournament in 1956 when she was in Mount Carmel College. She represented the Mysore state and won the long jump gold at the National Athletics Championship at Bangalore in 1957 beating her aunt Marjorie's record. Her aunt also captained the Mysore state in hockey and basketball. She went on to create a National record the next year at the 1958 National Games at Cuttack which stood for a long time till Reeth Abraham broke it. In 1962, she represented India at the Asian Games in Jakarta and reached the semifinals in 800m. She was the torch bearer at 1982 games at home. In 1964, she was selected for a tour of West Germany, Netherlands and Switzerland along with Milkha Singh and Gurbachan Singh Randhawa.

Her funeral was held at Ascension Church, Bengaluru.
