= Onofre Ramírez =

Nicaraguan boxer (born 1960)

Personal information
- Nationality: Nicaraguan
- Born: 5 September 1960 (age 65)

Sport
- Sport: Boxing

Onofre Ramírez (born 5 September 1960) is a Nicaraguan boxer. He competed in the men's flyweight event at the 1980 Summer Olympics. At the 1980 Summer Olympics, he lost to Petar Lesov of Bulgaria.
