= Shin Soon-ho =

South Korean tennis player

- Country (sports): South Korea
- Born: 8 November 1959 (age 65)
Medal record
Asian Games
Gold medal – first place	1982 New Delhi	Women's Doubles
Gold medal – first place	1982 New Delhi	Mixed Doubles
Gold medal – first place	1982 New Delhi	Women's Team
Bronze medal – third place	1986 Seoul	Women's Doubles

Shin Soon-ho (born 8 November 1959) is a South Korean former tennis player.

Shin won three gold medals for South Korea at the 1982 Asian Games in New Delhi, which came in the women's doubles, mixed doubles and team event.

She also represented South Korea in Federation Cup tennis, in both 1982 and 1983, for a total of eight ties. In 2007 she served as South Korea's Fed Cup captain.
