= Petar Lesov =

Bulgarian boxer (born 1960)

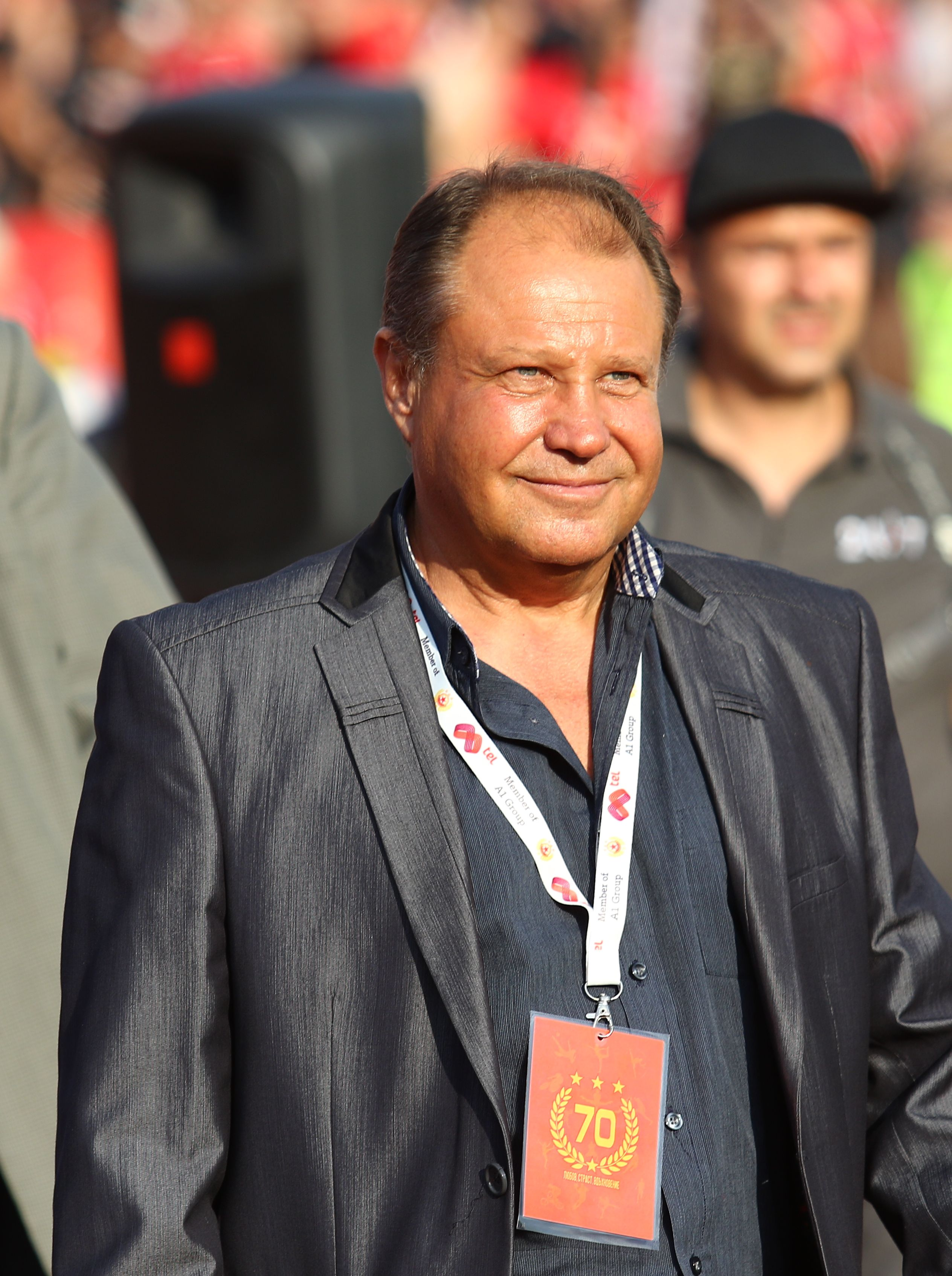

Personal information
- Full name: Петър Лесов
- Nationality: Bulgaria
- Born: 12 September 1960 (age 65) Rakovski, Plovdiv
- Height: 1.68 m (5 ft 6 in)
- Weight: 51 kg (112 lb)

Sport
- Sport: Boxing
- Weight class: Flyweight
Medal record
Olympic Games
Gold medal – first place	1980 Moscow	Flyweight
European Amateur Championships
Gold medal – first place	1981 Tampere	Flyweight
Gold medal – first place	1983 Varna	Flyweight

Petar Lesov (Bulgarian: Петър Лесов, born 12 September 1960) is a former Bulgarian boxer, who won the Flyweight Gold medal at the 1980 Summer Olympics. He is a two-time European champion in the flyweight division (1981 and 1983). Lesov is currently a boxing coach.

== Amateur career ==
Below is the Olympic record of Petar Lesov, a Bulgarian flyweight boxer who competed in the 1980 Moscow Olympics:

- Round of 32: Defeated Onofre Ramírez (Nicaragua) by decision, 5–0
- Round of 16: Defeated Hassen Sherif (Ethiopia) by decision, 5–0
- Quarterfinal: Defeated Gilberto Roman (Mexico) by decision, 4–1
- Semifinal: Defeated Hugh Russell (Ireland) by decision, 5–0
- Final: Defeated Viktor Miroshnichenko (USSR) by a second-round TKO (won gold medal)

== Professional career ==
Lesov turned pro in 1991 with little success. After five defeats by KO or TKO, including a loss to journeyman Wilson Rodriguez, he retired in 1992 with a record of 0–5–0.
