= Lebanon at the 1982 Asian Games =

- IOC code: LIB
- NOC: Lebanese Olympic Committee

in New Delhi
- Medals Ranked 17th: Gold 0 Silver 1 Bronze 0 Total 1

Asian Games appearances (overview)
- 1978; 1982; 1986; 1990; 1994; 1998; 2002; 2006; 2010; 2014; 2018; 2022; 2026

Lebanon participated in the 1982 Asian Games in Delhi, India on November 19 to December 4, 1982. Lebanon ended the games with single silver only.
