= K. K. Premachandran =

Indian sprinter

Personal information
- Nationality: Indian
- Born: Palghat
- Died: 16 April 2001 Kochi, Kerala, India

Sport
- Sport: Track and field
- Event: Sprints
Medal record
Asian Games
| Silver medal – second place | 1982 New Delhi | 400 metres |

K. K. Premachandran was an Indian track and field athlete who specialized in the 400 meters event. He won a silver medal in the 400 meters event in the 1982 Asian Games and was hailed as the successor to Milkha Singh.

== Career ==
Premachandran won the silver medal in the 400 metres event at the 1982 Asian games in New Delhi, having clocked 47.27 seconds in the final.

== Death ==
Premachandran died on 16 April 2001, aged 46, following a massive heart attack in Kochi, Kerala.
