= Yasutoshi Moriyama =

Japanese wrestler (born 1957)

Yasutoshi Moriyama (森山泰年, Moriyama Yasutoshi; born 4 August 1957) is a Japanese former wrestler who competed in the 1984 Summer Olympics, in the 1988 Summer Olympics, and in the 1992 Summer Olympics.
