= Malaysia at the 1982 Asian Games =

- IOC code: MAS
- NOC: Olympic Council of Malaysia
- Website: www.olympic.org.my (in English)

in New Delhi
- Competitors: 130 in 11 sports
- Medals Ranked 15th: Gold 1 Silver 0 Bronze 3 Total 4

Asian Games appearances (overview)
- 1954; 1958; 1962; 1966; 1970; 1974; 1978; 1982; 1986; 1990; 1994; 1998; 2002; 2006; 2010; 2014; 2018; 2022; 2026

Other related appearances
- North Borneo (1954, 1958, 1962); Sarawak (1962)

Malaysia competed in the 1982 Asian Games in New Delhi, India from 19 November to 4 December 1982. Malaysia ended the games at 4 overall medals including only 1 gold medal.

== Medal summary ==
=== Medals by sport ===
Sport	Gold	Silver	Bronze	Total	Rank
Athletics	1	0	1	2	7
Field hockey	0	0	2	2	4
Total	1	0	3	4	15

=== Medallists ===
Medal	Name	Sport	Event
Gold	Rabuan Pit	Athletics	Men's 100 metres
Bronze	Rabuan Pit	Athletics	Men's 200 metres
Bronze	Malaysia men's national field hockey team	Field hockey	Men's tournament
Bronze	Malaysia women's national field hockey team	Field hockey	Women's tournament

== Athletics ==
Key

- Note–Ranks given for track events are within the athlete's heat only
- Q = Qualified for the next round
- q = Qualified for the next round as a fastest loser or, in field events, by position without achieving the qualifying target
- NR = National record
- N/A = Round not applicable for the event
- Bye = Athlete not required to compete in round

Men
Track events

Athlete	Event	Final	
Athlete	Event	Time	Rank
Rabuan Pit	100 m	10.68	1st place, gold medalist(s)
Rabuan Pit	200 m	21.25	3rd place, bronze medalist(s)

== Basketball ==
=== Men's tournament ===
Group C

Team	Pld	W	L
Japan	2	2	0
Malaysia	2	1	1
South Yemen	2	0	2

Qualified for the finals

23 November

Malaysia	vs.	South Yemen

Jawaharlal Nehru Stadium, Delhi

25 November

Japan	67–59	Malaysia

Jawaharlal Nehru Stadium, Delhi

Final round

Team	Pld	W	L
South Korea	7	7	0
China	7	6	1
Japan	7	5	2
Philippines	7	3	4
North Korea	7	3	4
Kuwait	7	2	5
Malaysia	5	2	5
India	7	0	7

26 November

Japan	67–59	Malaysia

Jawaharlal Nehru Stadium, Delhi

27 November

Kuwait	vs.	Malaysia

Jawaharlal Nehru Stadium, Delhi

28 November

China	104–4?	Malaysia

Jawaharlal Nehru Stadium, Delhi

29 November

North Korea	81–66	Malaysia

Jawaharlal Nehru Stadium, Delhi

1 December

Malaysia	78–72	India

Jawaharlal Nehru Stadium, Delhi

2 December

South Korea	94–66	Malaysia

Jawaharlal Nehru Stadium, Delhi

3 December

Malaysia	84–70	Philippines

Jawaharlal Nehru Stadium, Delhi

Ranked 7th in final standings

== Field hockey ==
=== Men's tournament ===
Bronze medal match

Malaysia	3–0	Japan

New Delhi

Ranked 3rd in final standings

=== Women's tournament ===
Ranked 3rd in final standings

== Football ==
=== Men's tournament ===
Group C

Team	Pld	W	D	L	GF	GA	GD	Pts
India	3	2	1	0	5	2	+3	5
China	3	2	1	0	4	2	+2	5
Bangladesh	3	1	0	2	2	4	-2	2
Malaysia	3	0	0	3	1	4	-3	0

Qualified for the quarterfinals

20 November 1982

China	1 – 0	Malaysia
Liu Chengde 23'

22 November 1982

India	1 – 0	Malaysia
Kartick Seth 68'

24 November 1982

Bangladesh	2 – 1	Malaysia

Ranked 14th in final standings
