= Faraj Saad Marzouk =

Qatari sprinter

Personal information
- Nationality: Qatari
- Born: 1961 (age 64–65)

Sport
- Sport: Sprinting
- Event: 100 metres
Medal record
Men's athletics
Representing Qatar
Asian Championships
Gold medal – first place	1987 Singapore	4×100 m
Silver medal – second place	1985 Jakarta	4×100 m

Faraj Abdullah Saad Marzouk (Arabic: فرج عبد الله سعد مرزوق) (born 1961) is a Qatari sprinter. He competed in the men's 100 metres at the 1984 Summer Olympics.

He won the gold medal in the men's 100 metres at the Sixth Arab Games held in Morocco in August 1985.
