= Rabi Raj Thapa =

Nepalese boxer

Personal information
- Nationality: Nepalese
- Born: 19 December 1953 (age 71)

Sport
- Sport: Boxing

Rabi Raj Thapa (born 19 December 1953) is a Nepalese boxer. He competed in the men's flyweight event at the 1980 Summer Olympics. At the 1980 Summer Olympics.
