= Emmanuel Mlundwa =

Tanzanian boxer (born 1957)

Personal information
- Nationality: Tanzanian
- Born: 17 April 1957 (age 67)

Sport
- Sport: Boxing

Emmanuel Mlundwa (born 17 April 1957) is a Tanzanian boxer. He competed in the men's flyweight event at the 1980 Summer Olympics.
