= Sammudi Balasubramaniam =

Athlete from Tamil Nadu

Sammudi Balasubramaniam known as Bala, was an athlete from Tamil Nadu who specialises in long jump and triple jump. He was the second Indian to secure a bronze medal in triple jump in Asian Games.He touched this landmark at the 1982 Asian Games held at New Delhi, India with a performance of 16.14 m in his last attempt.

Balasubraminam died in 2016 following injuries from a fall while on pilgrimage to Sabarimala. He is survived by his wife and two sons — Vinod and Pradeep, both of whom are athletics students with the Sports Authority of India.
