= Taj Mohammad Khairi =

Afghan wrestler (born 1942)

Taj Mohammad Khairi (born 1942) is a former Afghanistan wrestler, who competed at the 1988 Summer Olympic Games in the light-heavyweight event.
