= Jo Ryon-sik =

North Korean boxer (born 1960)

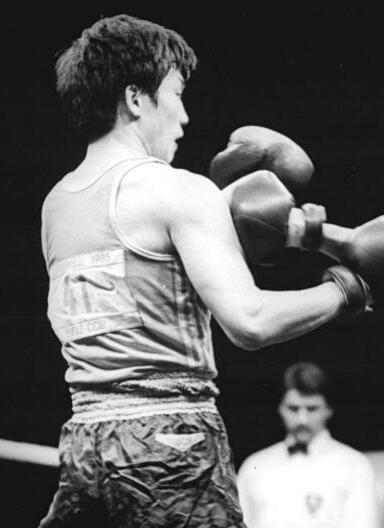
- Jo Ryon-sik in 1985

Personal information
- Nationality: North Korean
- Born: 30 January 1960 (age 66)

Sport
- Sport: Boxing
Medal record
Men's Boxing
Representing North Korea
Friendship Games
| Bronze medal – third place | 1984 Havana | Featherweight |
Asian Games
| Gold medal – first place | 1982 Delhi | Featherweight |

Jo Ryon-sik (Korean: 조련식; born 30 January 1960) is a North Korean boxer. He competed in the men's flyweight event at the 1980 Summer Olympics.
