= Imtiaz Mahmood =

Pakistani boxer

Imtiaz Mahmood is an Asian Games gold medal winning former boxer from Pakistan.

== Asian Games ==
At the 1978 Asian Games in Bangkok, Mahmood won the gold medal in the heavyweight category.
