= Ismail Khalil =

Iraqi boxer

Personal information
- Full name: Ismail Khalil Salman
- Nationality: Iraqi
- Born: 13 June 1957 (age 69)

Sport
- Sport: Boxing
Medal record
Representing Iraq
Asian Games
Silver medal – second place	1982 New Delhi	Heavyweight
World Cup
Bronze medal – third place	1983 Rome	Light heavyweight

Ismail Khalil Salman (Arabic: اسماعيل خليل سلمان, born 13 June 1957) is an Iraqi boxer. He competed at the 1980 Summer Olympics and the 1984 Summer Olympics.
