= C. C. Machaiah =

Indian boxer

Chenanda C. Machaiah (born 8 March 1954) is a boxer from Karnataka, India. He was one of the earliest boxers to represent India internationally. He represented India as a boxer in the 1976 Summer Olympics at Montreal, losing in the first round in the Light Welterweight (– 63.5 kg) category.

He also represented India on 11 occasions, including the Asian Boxing Championships at Jakarta (1977), the Indo-USSR Tournament in USSR (1977), the 1978 Commonwealth Games in Edmonton and the 8th Asian Games at Bangkok. He won a total of 6 international medals including one gold. He is the recipient of the "Arjuna Award" in 1978-79, the highest sports honour for a sportsman in India.

== See also ==
- Boxing at the 1976 Summer Olympics
