= Imad Idriss =

Syrian boxer

Personal information
- Nationality: Syrian
- Born: 22 June 1955 (age 70)

Sport
- Sport: Boxing

Imad Idriss (Arabic: عماد ادريس; born 22 June 1955) is a Syrian boxer. He competed in the men's light middleweight event at the 1980 Summer Olympics, where he lost his only fight.
