= Kaur Singh =

Indian boxer (died 2023)

Personal information
- Nationality: Indian
- Born: 1948/1949 Khanal Khurd, Sangrur, East Punjab, India
- Died: 27 April 2023 (aged 74) Kurukshetra, Haryana, India
- Weight: Heavyweight

Boxing career
- Stance: Orthodox
Medal record
Men's amateur boxing
Representing India
Asian Games
Gold medal – first place	1982 New Delhi	Heavyweight
Asian Championships
Gold medal – first place	1980	Heavyweight

Kaur Singh (Punjabi: ਕੌਰ ਸਿੰਘ; 1948/1949 – 27 April 2023) was an Indian heavyweight champion boxer from Punjab. Singh won three gold medals for senior national boxing championship, Asian Boxing Championship and Asian Games.

== Early life ==
Singh was born in a Jat Sikh Family of village Khanal Khurd in Sangrur, Punjab's Malwa region. He was a small-time farmer before joining the Indian army in 1973 as havildar at the age of 23 where he participated in the India-Pakistan war; and was awarded Sena Medal for his bravery and received the Vishisht Sewa Medal in 1988.

== Boxing career ==
In 1979, Singh won a gold medal at the senior national boxing championship and remained the holder of the gold medal for four years till 1983.

In 1980, Singh won a gold medal at the Asian Boxing Championship in Mumbai.

In 1982, Singh won a gold medal at the heavyweight category Asian Games held at New Delhi, in the same year he got the Arjuna Award by the Ministry of Youth Affairs and Sports.

In 1983, the Government of India awarded Singh with the Padma Shri award for outstanding contribution to Indian sports.

Singh retired from boxing career in 1984 after participating and representing India in the Los Angeles Olympics where he won two bouts, but was defeated in the third match.

=== Fighting against Muhammad Ali ===
On 27 January 1980, Singh fought at Delhi's National Stadium against Muhammad Ali in an exhibition match of four-rounds. "Us de mukke bahut hi dumdar si (His punches had great power). I clearly remember that jab, his famous jab. It seemed to come out of nowhere. He used his right hand to block my punches, and his counterpunch to hit me. His speed was amazing; not once during those four rounds did the speed drop. He was shorter than me but his ring craft and movement took him out of my reach," said Singh.

== Death ==
Singh died on 27 April 2023, at the age of 74.

== Legacy ==
A biopic film of Singh, Padma Shri Kaur Singh, was slated to release in 2020, with producer Karam Batth playing Singh. The film highlighted apathy of governments in releasing the prize money they announced. Film release was delayed due to COVID-19 and then due to clash with other film releases in 2022. Karam Batth in an interview said "It was supposed to release on July 8 but the makers of Shareek 2 shifted its release date to the same Friday. I was fine with it as both the films are quite different. But then team Sohreyan Da Pind Aa Gaya also announced its release date on the same day, which made us postpone ours to July 22."

== Exhibition boxing record ==
1 fight	0 wins	0 losses
Non-scored	1	

No.	Result	Record	Opponent	Type	Round, time	Date	Location	Notes
1	—N/a	0–0 (1)	(United States) Muhammad Ali	—N/a	4	27 Jan 1980	National Stadium, New Delhi, India	Non-scored bout
