= Ryu Bun-hwa =

North Korean boxer

Personal information
- Nationality: North Korean
- Born: 26 December 1959 (age 65)

Sport
- Sport: Boxing

Ryu Bun-hwa (born 26 December 1959) is a North Korean boxer. He competed in the men's light welterweight event at the 1980 Summer Olympics.
