= Daniel Radu (boxer) =

Romanian boxer

Personal information
- Nationality: Romanian
- Born: 26 December 1959 (age 66) Bucharest, Romania

Sport
- Sport: Boxing
Medal record
Representing Romania
Romania National Amateur Boxing Championships
Gold medal – first place	1979 Bucharest	Flyweight
European Amateur Championships
Silver medal – second place	1979 Cologne	Flyweight

Daniel Radu (born 26 December 1959) is a Romanian boxer. He competed in the men's flyweight event at the 1980 Summer Olympics. Radu also won one national senior title and one bronze medal at the European Amateur Boxing Championships.
