= Mongolia at the 1982 Asian Games =

- IOC code: MGL
- NOC: Mongolian National Olympic Committee

in New Delhi
- Medals Ranked 9th: Gold 3 Silver 3 Bronze 1 Total 7

Asian Games appearances (overview)
- 1974; 1978; 1982; 1986; 1990; 1994; 1998; 2002; 2006; 2010; 2014; 2018; 2022; 2026

Mongolia participated in the 9th Asian Games, officially known as the XI Asiad held in Delhi, India from 12 November to 4 December 1982. Mongolia ranked 9th in overall medal table with 3 gold medals in this Asiad edition.

== Medal summary ==
=== Medals by sport ===
Sport	Gold	Silver	Bronze	Total
Wrestling	2	1		3
Boxing			1	1
Shooting	1	1		2
Cycling		1		1
Total	3	3	1	7

=== Medalists ===
Medal	Athlete	Sport	Event
Gold	Buyandelgeriin Bold	Wrestling	Men's freestyle 68 kg
Gold	Zevegiin Düvchin	Wrestling	Men's freestyle 82 kg
Gold	Mongolia	Shooting	Men's team
Silver	Dashdorjiin Tserentogtokh	Wrestling	Men's freestyle 100 kg
Bronze	Sambuugiin Khicheengui	Boxing	Men's 91 kg
