= Afghanistan at the 1982 Asian Games =

- IOC code: AFG
- NOC: Afghanistan National Olympic Committee

in New Delhi
- Medals Ranked 17th: Gold 0 Silver 1 Bronze 0 Total 1

Asian Games appearances (overview)
- 1951; 1954; 1958; 1962; 1966; 1970; 1974; 1978; 1982; 1986; 1990; 1994; 1998; 2002; 2006; 2010; 2014; 2018; 2022; 2026

Afghanistan participated in the 1982 Asian Games in Delhi, India on November 19 to December 4, 1982. Afghanistan ended the Games with a solitary medal, a silver, and finished in the 17th place.

Afghanistan sent a 14 member contingent for this Asiad. Lone silver came from wrestling event, won by Taj Mohammad Khairi.

== Medalists ==
Medal	Name	Sport	Event
Silver	Taj Mohammad Khairi	Wrestling	Freestyle 82 kg
