= Indonesia at the 1982 Asian Games =

- IOC code: INA
- NOC: Indonesian Olympic Committee
- Website: www.nocindonesia.or.id (in English)

in New Delhi
- Medals Ranked 6th: Gold 4 Silver 4 Bronze 7 Total 15

Asian Games appearances (overview)
- 1951; 1954; 1958; 1962; 1966; 1970; 1974; 1978; 1982; 1986; 1990; 1994; 1998; 2002; 2006; 2010; 2014; 2018; 2022; 2026

Indonesia participated in the 1982 Asian Games in Delhi, India on November 19 to December 4, 1982. Indonesia finished sixth in total medals.

== Medal summary ==
=== Medal table ===
Sport	Gold	Silver	Bronze	Total
Badminton	2	3	0	5
Tennis	2	0	0	2
Archery	0	1	0	1
Swimming	0	0	6	6
Weightlifting	0	0	1	1
Total	4	4	7	15

=== Medalists ===
Medal	Name	Sport	Event
Gold	Icuk Sugiarto; Christian Hadinata	Badminton	Men's doubles
Gold	Christian Hadinata; Ivana Lie	Badminton	Mixed doubles
Gold	Yustedjo Tarik	Tennis	Men's singles
Gold	Hadiman; Yustedjo Tarik; Donald Wailan-Walalangi; Tintus Wibowo	Tennis	Men's team
Silver	Tatang Ferry Budiman; Donald Pandiangan; Suradi Rukimin	Archery	Men's team
Silver	Liem Swie King	Badminton	Men's singles
Silver	Christian Hadinata; Wirawan Hadiyanto; Rudy Heryanto; Hariamanto Kartono; Liem Swie King; Icuk Sugiarto	Badminton	Men's team
Silver	Icuk Sugiarto; Ruth Damayanti	Badminton	Mixed doubles
Bronze	Lukman Niode	Swimming	Men's 100 m freestyle
Bronze	Lukman Niode	Swimming	Men's 100 m backstroke
Bronze	Lukman Niode	Swimming	Men's 200 m backstroke
Bronze	Zain Chaidir; John David Item; Gerald Item; Lukman Niode	Swimming	Men's 4×100 m freestyle relay
Bronze	Ridwan Muis; John David Item; Gerald Item; Lukman Niode	Swimming	Men's 4×200 m freestyle relay
Bronze	Lukman Niode; Faezal Mulyawan; John David Item; Gerald Item	Swimming	Men's 4×100 m medley relay
Bronze	Maman Suryaman	Weightlifting	Men's 52 kg
