= Iraq at the 1982 Asian Games =

- IOC code: IRQ
- NOC: National Olympic Committee of Iraq

in New Delhi
- Medals Ranked 11th: Gold 2 Silver 3 Bronze 4 Total 9

Asian Games appearances (overview)
- 1974; 1978; 1982; 1986; 1990–2002; 2006; 2010; 2014; 2018; 2022; 2026

Iraq participated in the 1982 Asian Games in Delhi, India on November 19 to December 4, 1982. Iraq finished eleventh in total medals table.
