= Philippines at the 1982 Asian Games =

- IOC code: PHI
- NOC: Philippine Olympic Committee
- Website: www.olympic.ph (in English)

in New Delhi
- Medals Ranked 10th: Gold 2 Silver 3 Bronze 9 Total 14

Asian Games appearances (overview)
- 1951; 1954; 1958; 1962; 1966; 1970; 1974; 1978; 1982; 1986; 1990; 1994; 1998; 2002; 2006; 2010; 2014; 2018; 2022; 2026

The Philippines participated in the 1982 Asian Games held in New Delhi, India from November 19 to December 4, 1982. Ranked 10th with 2 gold medals, 3 silver medals and 9 bronze medals with a total of 14 over-all medals.

== Asian Games Performance ==
A year after emerging as the country's newest track sensation with a golden double at the 1981 Manila Southeast Asian Games, Lydia de Vega became Asia's sprint darling, winning the century dash in the 1982 Asian Games. The 17-year old De Vega bagged the 100-meter dash in 11.76 seconds to become Asia's fastest woman.

It was only one of the two gold medals won by the 114-man contingent, but it was enough to brighten another dismal performance by the Philippines in the quadrennial meet. A swimmer named William "Billy" Wilson maintained swimming's legacy as a perennial source of medals, winning the gold medal in the 200-meter freestyle.

== Medalists ==
The following Philippine competitors won medals at the Games.

=== Gold ===
No.	Medal	Name	Sport	Event
1	Gold	Lydia de Vega	Athletics	Women's 100m
2	Gold	William Wilson	Swimming	Men's 200m Freestyle

=== Silver ===
No.	Medal	Name	Sport	Event
1	Silver	Efren Tabanas	Boxing	Light flyweight 48kg
2	Silver	Policarpio Ortega	Sailing	Windglider
3	Silver	William Wilson	Swimming	Men's 400m Freestyle

=== Bronze ===
No.	Medal	Name	Sport	Event
1	Bronze	Hector Begeo	Athletics	Men's 3000m Steeplechase
2	Bronze	Fernando de Asis	Boxing	Lightweight 60kg
3	Bronze	Raymundo Suico	Boxing	Welterweight 67kg
4	Bronze	Rodolfo Guaves	Cycling	Track 1km time Trial
5	Bronze	Edgardo Pagarigan	Cycling	Track Points Race
6	Bronze	Deogracias Asuncion; Jomel Lorenzo; Renato Mier; Diomedes Panton	Cycling	Track Team Pursuit
7	Bronze	Steven Virata; Marielle Virata; Fidelino Barba; Jose Montilla	Equestrian	Team
8	Bronze	Jose Medina	Shooting	50m Rifle Prone
9	Bronze	William Wilson	Swimming	Men's 1500m Freestyle

=== Multiple ===
Name	Sport	Gold	Silver	Bronze	Total
William Wilson	Swimming	1	1	1	3

== Medal summary ==
=== Medal by sports ===
Sport	Gold	Silver	Bronze	Total
Swimming	1	1	1	3
Athletics	1	0	1	2
Boxing	0	1	2	3
Sailing	0	1	0	1
Cycling	0	0	3	3
Equestrian	0	0	1	1
Shooting	0	0	1	1
Totals (7 entries)	2	3	9	14
