= Saudi Arabia at the 1982 Asian Games =

- IOC code: KSA
- NOC: Saudi Arabian Olympic Committee

in New Delhi
- Medals Ranked 19th: Gold 0 Silver 0 Bronze 1 Total 1

Asian Games appearances (overview)
- 1978; 1982; 1986; 1990; 1994; 1998; 2002; 2006; 2010; 2014; 2018; 2022; 2026

Saudi Arabia participated in the 1982 Asian Games in Delhi, India from November 19 to December 4, 1982. Saudi Arabia ended the games with a single bronze medal.
