= Kuwait at the 1982 Asian Games =

- IOC code: KUW
- NOC: Kuwait Olympic Committee

in New Delhi
- Medals Ranked 13th: Gold 1 Silver 3 Bronze 3 Total 7

Asian Games appearances (overview)
- 1974; 1978; 1982; 1986; 1990; 1994; 1998; 2002; 2006; 2010; 2014; 2018; 2022; 2026

Other related appearances
- Athletes from Kuwait (2010)

Kuwait participated in the 1982 Asian Games in Delhi, India on November 19 to December 4, 1982. Kuwait ended the games at 7 overall medals including only 1 gold medal.
