= India at the 1982 Asian Games =

- IOC code: IND
- NOC: Indian Olympic Association

in New Delhi
- Medals Ranked 5th: Gold 13 Silver 19 Bronze 25 Total 57

Asian Games appearances (overview)
- 1951; 1954; 1958; 1962; 1966; 1970; 1974; 1978; 1982; 1986; 1990; 1994; 1998; 2002; 2006; 2010; 2014; 2018; 2022; 2026

India was the host nation for the 1982 Asian Games held at Delhi from 19 November to 4 December 1982. Ranked 5th with 13 gold medals, 19 silver medals and 25 bronze medals with a total of 57 over-all medals.

== Medals by sport ==
Sport	Gold	Silver	Bronze	Total
Athletics	4	9	8	21
Badminton	0	0	5	5
Boxing	1	2	3	6
Equestrian	3	1	1	5
Hockey	1	1	0	2
Golf	2	1	0	3
Rowing	0	0	1	1
Sailing	1	1	1	3
Wrestling	1	1	2	4
Shooting	0	2	1	3
Tennis	0	1	0	1
Water Polo	0	0	1	1
Weightlifting	0	0	2	2
Total	13	19	25	57

== Gold Medal Winners ==
- Charles Borromeo (athlete) - Men's 800m;
- MD Valsamma - Women's 400m hurdles;
- Chand Ram - Men's 20 km walk;
- Bahadur Singh Chouhan - Men's Shot Put;
- Raghubir Singh - Men's Equestrian;
- Rupi Brar - Equestrian Tent Pegging;
- Men's Equestrian Team;
- Men's Golf Team;
- Bunny Lakshman Singh - Men's Golf;
- Satpal Singh - Wrestling, Heavyweight;
- Kaur Singh - Boxing, Heavyweight;
- Women's Hockey Team;
- Tarapore and Karanja - Sailing, Enterprise Class;

== Football ==
Head coach: (India) P. K. Banerjee

No.	Pos.	Player	Date of birth (age)	Caps	Goals	Club
	GK	Bhaskar Ganguly				(All India Football Federation) East Bengal
	GK	Brahmanand Sankhwalkar	6 March 1954 (aged 28)			(All India Football Federation) Salgaocar
	DF	Compton Dutta				(All India Football Federation) Bengal
	DF	Monoranjan Bhattacharya				(All India Football Federation) East Bengal
	DF	Sudip Chatterjee	5 February 1959 (aged 23)			(All India Football Federation) Mohun Bagan
	DF	Aloke Mukherjee	1 May 1960 (aged 22)			(All India Football Federation) East Bengal
	DF	Gurcharan Singh Parmar				(All India Football Federation) Punjab
	DF	Aslam Khan				(All India Football Federation) Karnataka
	MF	Prasun Banerjee	6 April 1955 (aged 27)			(All India Football Federation) Bengal
	MF	Prasanta Banerjee	12 February 1958 (aged 24)			(All India Football Federation) Bengal
	MF	Mohammad Farid				(All India Football Federation) Bengal
	MF	Parminder Singh	5 May 1957 (aged 25)			(All India Football Federation) Punjab
	MF	Harjinder Singh				(All India Football Federation) JCT Mills
	FW	Bidesh Bose	15 November 1953 (aged 29)			(All India Football Federation) Bengal
	FW	Shabbir Ali	26 January 1956 (aged 26)			(All India Football Federation) Bengal
	FW	Biswajit Bhattacharya				(All India Football Federation) Bengal
	FW	Kartick Seth				(All India Football Federation) East Bengal
	FW	C. B. Thapa				(All India Football Federation) Services

=== Preliminary round ===
Team	Pld	W	D	L	GF	GA	GD	Pts
India	3	2	1	0	5	2	+3	5
China	3	2	1	0	4	2	+2	5
Bangladesh	3	1	0	2	2	4	−2	2
Malaysia	3	0	0	3	1	4	−3	0

20 November

India	2–0	Bangladesh
Prasun Banerjee 1', 90+5'

Jawaharlal Nehru Stadium, New Delhi

22 November

India	1–0	Malaysia
Kartick Sett 68'

Ambedkar Stadium, New Delhi

24 November

India	2–2	China
Shabbir Ali 53'; Kartick Seth 60'		Shen Xiangfu 25'; Zuo Shusheng 82'

Ambedkar Stadium, New Delhi

=== Quarterfinals ===
27 November

India	0–1	Saudi Arabia
		Bayazid 89'

Jawaharlal Nehru Stadium, New Delhi
