= Japan at the 1982 Asian Games =

- IOC code: JPN
- NOC: Japanese Olympic Committee

in New Delhi
- Competitors: 355 in 21 sports
- Flag bearer: Yumi Egami
- Medals Ranked 2nd: Gold 57 Silver 52 Bronze 44 Total 153

Asian Games appearances (overview)
- 1951; 1954; 1958; 1962; 1966; 1970; 1974; 1978; 1982; 1986; 1990; 1994; 1998; 2002; 2006; 2010; 2014; 2018; 2022; 2026

Japan participated in the 1982 Asian Games held in New Delhi, India from November 19, 1982, to December 4, 1982. This country was ranked 2nd with 57 gold medals, 52 silver medals and 44 bronze medals with a total of 153 medals to secure its second spot in the medal tally.
