= South Korea at the 1982 Asian Games =

- IOC code: KOR
- NOC: Korean Olympic Committee

in New Delhi
- Competitors: 280 in 20 sports
- Officials: 126
- Medals Ranked 3rd: Gold 28 Silver 28 Bronze 37 Total 93

Asian Games appearances (overview)
- 1954; 1958; 1962; 1966; 1970; 1974; 1978; 1982; 1986; 1990; 1994; 1998; 2002; 2006; 2010; 2014; 2018; 2022; 2026

South Korea (IOC designation:Korea) participated in the 1982 Asian Games held in Delhi, India from November 19, 1982, to December 4, 1982.

== Medal summary ==
=== Medal table ===
Sport	Gold	Silver	Bronze	Total
Boxing	7	2	3	12
Tennis	4	3	0	7
Swimming	3	4	5	12
Athletics	3	3	4	10
Shooting	3	3	4	10
Cycling	2	3	1	6
Archery	2	2	1	5
Weightlifting	2	0	1	3
Badminton	1	1	4	6
Basketball	1	1	0	2
Table tennis	0	2	4	6
Wrestling	0	2	3	5
Golf	0	1	0	1
Hockey	0	1	0	1
Gymnastics	0	0	2	2
Rowing	0	0	2	2
Volleyball	0	0	2	2
Handball	0	0	1	1
Totals (18 entries)	28	28	37	93

=== Medalists ===
==== Boxing ====
- Heo Yong-mo
- Kim Dong-kil
- Lee Hae-jung
- Moon Sung-kil

==== Swimming ====
- Choi Yun-hui
