= North Korea at the 1982 Asian Games =

- IOC code: PRK
- NOC: Olympic Committee of the Democratic People's Republic of Korea

in New Delhi
- Medals Ranked 4th: Gold 17 Silver 19 Bronze 20 Total 56

Asian Games appearances (overview)
- 1974; 1978; 1982; 1986; 1990; 1994; 1998; 2002; 2006; 2010; 2014; 2018; 2022; 2026

North Korea participated in the 1982 Asian Games in Delhi, India on November 19 to December 4, 1982. North Korea finished fifth in total medals and fourth in gold medals count.
