= Pakistan at the 1982 Asian Games =

- IOC code: PAK
- NOC: Pakistan Olympic Association

in New Delhi
- Medals Ranked 8th: Gold 3 Silver 3 Bronze 5 Total 11

Asian Games appearances (overview)
- 1954; 1958; 1962; 1966; 1970; 1974; 1978; 1982; 1986; 1990; 1994; 1998; 2002; 2006; 2010; 2014; 2018; 2022; 2026

Pakistan participated in the 1982 Asian Games in New Delhi, India from 19 November to 4 December 1982. One of their gold medals in the Games came in the field hockey tournament, where they beat the hosts India 7–1 in the final.
