= 1982 Asian Games =

Multi-sport event in Delhi, India

IX Asian Games
- Friendship, Fraternity, Forever
- Host city: Delhi, India
- Nations: 33
- Athletes: 4,595
- Events: 196 in 21 sports
- Opening: 19 November 1982
- Closing: 4 December 1982
- Opened by: Zail Singh; President of India
- Closed by: Fahad Al-Ahmed Al-Jaber Al-Sabah; President of the Olympic Council of Asia
- Athlete's Oath: P.T. Usha
- Torch lighter: Deanna Syme Tewari & Balbir Singh Sr.
- Main venue: Jawaharlal Nehru Stadium
- Website: ocasia.org (archived)

Summer

Winter

The 9th Asian Games (Hindi: नौवें एशियाई खेल), also known as Delhi 1982 (Hindi: दिल्ली 1982), were held from 19 November to 4 December 1982, in Delhi, India. 74 Asian and Asian Games records were broken at the event. This was also the first Asiad to be held under the aegis of the Olympic Council of Asia. Delhi joined Bangkok as the cities to host multiple editions of the Asian Games up to this point. Later, Jakarta and Doha would enter this group.

A total of 3,411 athletes from 33 National Olympic Committees (NOCs) participated in these games, competing in 196 events in 21 sports and 23 disciplines. The number of participating countries was the highest in Asian Games history. Handball, equestrian, rowing and golf were included for the first time; fencing and bowling were excluded.

== Highlights ==
These Asian Games saw the beginning of Chinese dominance in the medals tally.

Japan had won the maximum number of medals in previous editions of the Games. China made its presence felt in the sporting world by dethroning Japan as the top medalists. In preparation for the IX Asian Games, color television was introduced in India in a big way, as the Games were to be broadcast in colour.

The logo of the games was the image of Mishra Yantra, one of the four distinct astronomical instruments of the Jantar Mantar, New Delhi observatory.

The mascot for the Games was Appu – a young elephant, based on a real-life one named Kuttinarayanan, who died on 14 May 2005.

Host of the next (10th) Asian Games in 1986, and the 24th Summer Olympics in 1988, Seoul, South Korea participated in the Delhi Asian Games with a 406-person delegation, including an observation team to study the facilities, management and events. Doordarshan started colour television broadcasts expressly for the Asian Games 1982.

It was officially opened by President Zail Singh and athlete's oath was taken by Geeta Zutshi. The main stadium for the games was the Jawaharlal Nehru Stadium.

A coin was also minted for the event.

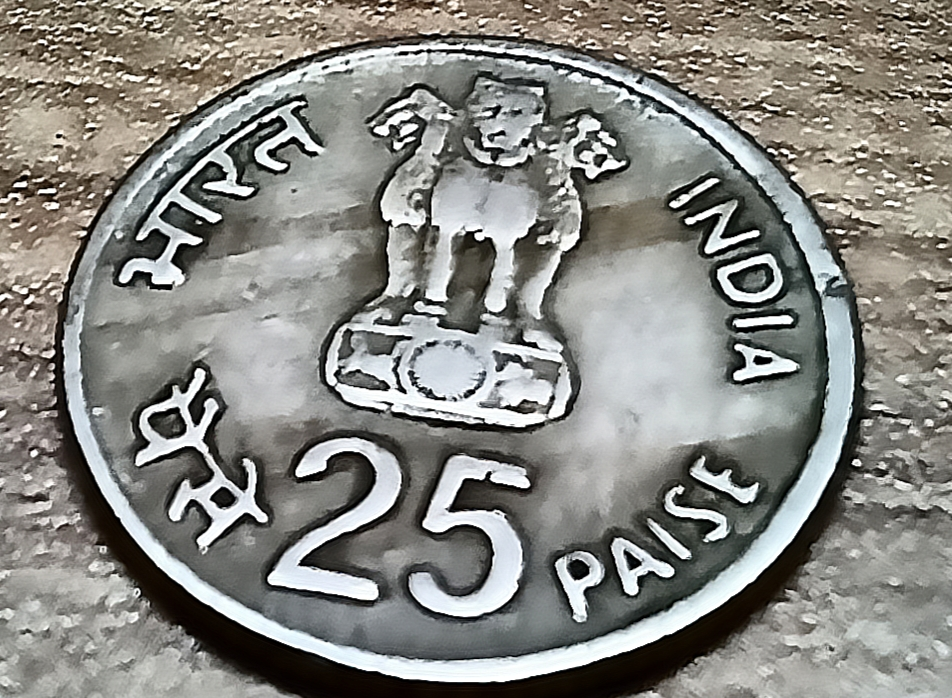
Obverse of the coin commemorating the 1982 Asian games held in New Delhi

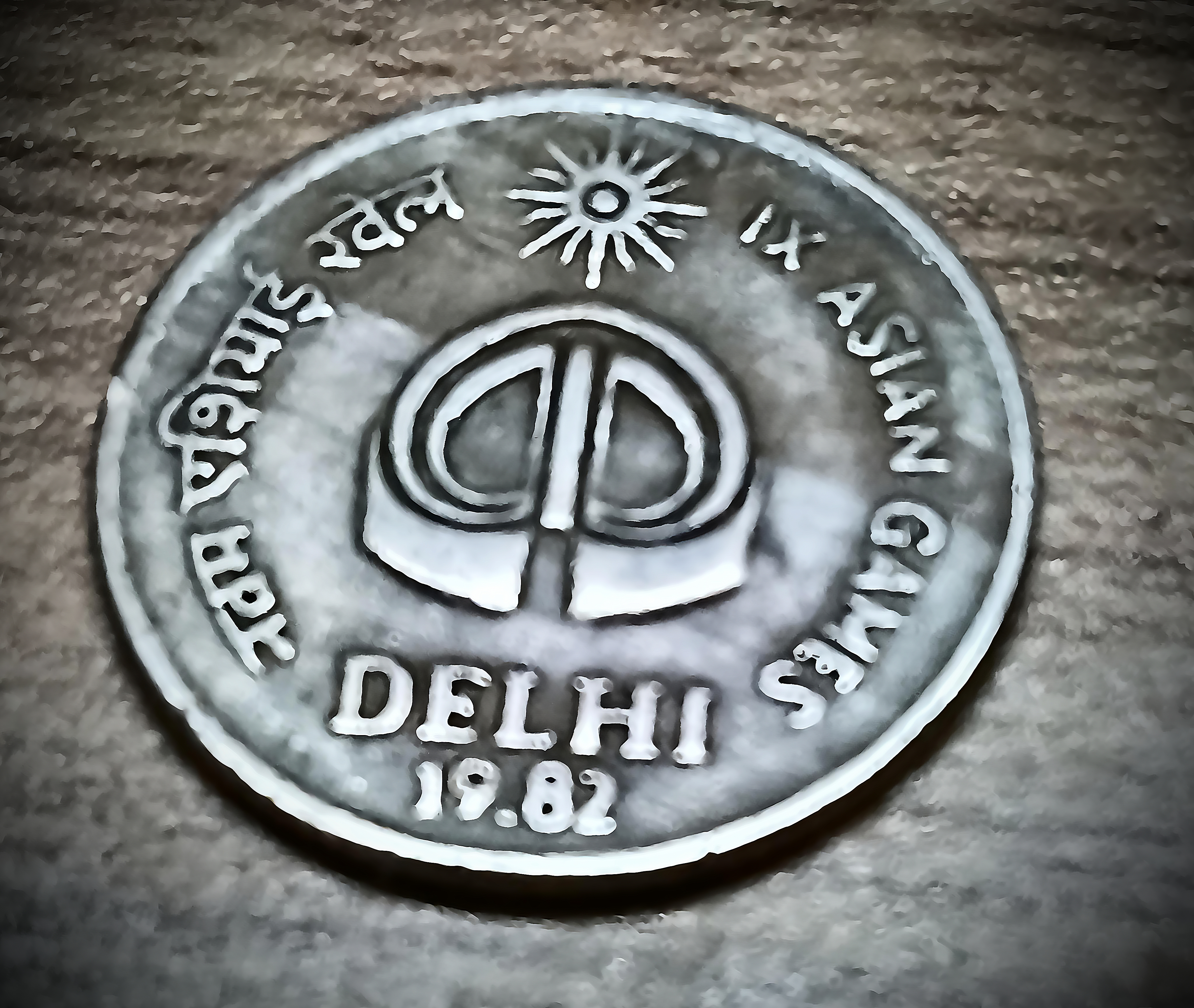
Reverse of the 1982 Asian games coin

== Sports ==
- Archery (4)
- Athletics (40)
- Badminton (7)
- Basketball (2)
- Boxing (12)
- Cycling (7)
- Diving (4)
- Equestrian (4)
- Field hockey (2)
- Football (1)
- Golf (2)
- Gymnastics (14)
- Handball (1)
- Rowing (4)
- Sailing (4)
- Shooting (22)
- Swimming (29)
- Table tennis (7)
- Tennis (7)
- Volleyball (2)
- Water polo (1)
- Weightlifting (10)
- Wrestling (10)

Exhibition sports

- Kabaddi
- Sepak takraw

== Participating nations ==
- Afghanistan (14)
- Bahrain (22)
- Bangladesh (11)
- Burma (9)
- China (265)
- Hong Kong (172)
- India (828)
- Indonesia (170)
- Iran (130)
- Iraq (30)
- Japan (344)
- Kuwait (26)
- Laos (5)
- Lebanon (16)
- Malaysia (88)
- Maldives (8)
- Mongolia (11)
- Nepal (15)
- North Korea (71)
- South Korea (188)
- Oman (19)
- Pakistan (113)
- Philippines (184)
- Qatar (77)
- Saudi Arabia (21)
- Singapore (83)
- Sri Lanka (15)
- Syria (20)
- Thailand (233)
- United Arab Emirates (86)
- Vietnam (540)
- North Yemen (17)
- South Yemen (20)

Number of athletes by National Olympic Committees (by highest to lowest)

IOC Letter Code	Country	Athletes
IND	India	828
VIE	Vietnam	540
JPN	Japan	344
CHN	China	265
THA	Thailand	233
KOR	South Korea	188
PHI	Philippines	184
HKG	Hong Kong	172
INA	Indonesia	170
IRN	Iran	130
PAK	Pakistan	113
MAL	Malaysia	88
UAE	United Arab Emirates	86
SIN	Singapore	83
QAT	Qatar	77
PRK	North Korea	71
IRQ	Iraq	30
KUW	Kuwait	26
BRN	Bahrain	22
KSA	Saudi Arabia	21
SYR	Syria	20
ADE	South Yemen	20
OMA	Oman	19
YAR	North Yemen	17
LIB	Lebanon	16
NEP	Nepal	15
SRI	Sri Lanka	15
AFG	Afghanistan	14
BAN	Bangladesh	11
MGL	Mongolia	11
BIR	Burma	9
MDV	Maldives	8
LAO	Laos	5

== Medal table ==
1982 Asian Games Mascot "Appu"

The top ten ranked NOCs at these Games are listed below. The host nation, India, is highlighted.

China won Asian Games for the first time by defeating Japan in gold medal tally, and has become the defending winning team since.

* Host nation (India)

Rank	Nation	Gold	Silver	Bronze	Total
1	China (CHN)	61	51	41	153
2	Japan (JPN)	57	52	44	153
3	South Korea (KOR)	28	28	37	93
4	North Korea (PRK)	17	19	20	56
5	India (IND)*	13	19	25	57
6	Indonesia (INA)	4	4	7	15
7	Iran (IRN)	4	4	4	12
8	Pakistan (PAK)	3	3	5	11
9	Mongolia (MGL)	3	3	1	7
10	Philippines (PHI)	2	3	9	14
11–23	Remaining	7	14	22	43
Totals (23 entries)		199	200	215	614

== See also ==
- Asian Games
- 1951 Asian Games
- 2010 Commonwealth Games
- 2030 Commonwealth Games

Preceded by Bangkok	Asian Games; New Delhi; IX Asiad (1982)	Succeeded by Seoul
