= 1981 IAAF World Cup – Results =

These are the full results of the 1981 IAAF World Cup which was held between 4 and 6 September 1981 at the Stadio Olimpico in Rome, Italy.

== Results ==
=== 100 m ===
==== Men ====
4 September
Wind: +0.2 m/s

Rank	Athlete	Team	Time	Points	Notes
1	Allan Wells (GBR)	Europe	10.20	9	
2	Ernest Obeng (GHA)	Africa	10.21	8	
3	Frank Emmelmann	East Germany	10.31	7	
4	Nikolay Sidorov	Soviet Union	10.41	6	
5	Colin Bradford (JAM)	Americas	10.44	5	
6	Pierfrancesco Pavoni	Italy	10.51	4	
7	Gerrard Keating (AUS)	Oceania	10.70	3	
8	Suchart Chairsuvaparb (THA)	Asia	10.73	2	
9	Carl Lewis	United States	10.96	1	

==== Women ====
5 September
Wind: +0.1 m/s

Rank	Athlete	Team	Time	Points	Notes
1	Evelyn Ashford	United States	11.02	9	
2	Kathy Smallwood (GBR)	Europe	11.10	8	
3	Marlies Göhr	East Germany	11.13	7	
4	Angella Taylor (CAN)	Americas	11.18	6	
5	Natalya Bochina	Soviet Union	11.38	5	
6	Marisa Masullo	Italy	11.53	4	
7	Helen Edwards (AUS)	Oceania	11.58	3	
8	Nawal El Moutawakel (MAR)	Africa	11.92	2	
9	Yukiko Osako (JPN)	Asia	12.14	1	

=== 200 m ===
==== Men ====
6 September
Wind: +0.1 m/s

Rank	Athlete	Team	Time	Points	Notes
1	Mel Lattany	United States	20.21	9	
2	Allan Wells (GBR)	Europe	20.53	8	
3	Frank Emmelmann	East Germany	20.57	7	
4	Don Quarrie (JAM)	Americas	20.66	6	
5	Giovanni Bongiorni	Italy	21.11	5	
6	Yuriy Naumenko	Soviet Union	21.13	4	
7	Degnan Kablan (CIV)	Africa	21.20	3	
8	Toshio Toyota (JPN)	Asia	21.39	2	
9	Peter Van Miltenburg (AUS)	Oceania	21.88	1	

==== Women ====
4 September
Wind: +0.7 m/s

Rank	Athlete	Team	Time	Points	Notes
1	Evelyn Ashford	United States	22.18	9	
2	Jarmila Kratochvílová (TCH)	Europe	22.31	8	
3	Bärbel Wöckel	East Germany	22.41	7	
4	Angella Taylor (CAN)	Americas	22.67	6	
5	Natalya Bochina	Soviet Union	23.05	5	
6	Marisa Masullo	Italy	23.22	4	
7	Helen Edwards (AUS)	Oceania	23.68	3	
8	Hannah Afriyie (GHA)	Africa	24.63	2	
9	Emiko Konishi (JPN)	Asia	24.82	1	

=== 400 m ===
==== Men ====
5 September

Rank	Athlete	Team	Time	Points	Notes
1	Cliff Wiley	United States	44.88	9	
2	Mauro Zuliani	Italy	45.26	8	
3	Bert Cameron (JAM)	Americas	45.27	7	
4	Hartmut Weber (FRG)	Europe	45.52	6	
5	Viktor Markin	Soviet Union	45.78	5	
6	Andreas Knebel	East Germany	45.86	4	
7	Hassan El Kashief (SUD)	Africa	45.96	3	
8	Gary Minihan (AUS)	Oceania	46.85	2	
9	Takevuki Isobe (JPN)	Asia	47.71	1	

==== Women ====
6 September

Rank	Athlete	Team	Time	Points	Notes
1	Jarmila Kratochvílová (TCH)	Europe	48.61	9	
2	Marita Koch	East Germany	49.27	8	
3	Jackie Pusey (JAM)	Americas	51.48	7	
4	Denean Howard	United States	51.76	6	
5	Erica Rossi	Italy	52.50	5	
6	Irina Nazarova	Soviet Union	53.21	4	
7	Leanne Evans (AUS)	Oceania	53.44	3	
8	Ruth Atuti (KEN)	Africa	55.58	2	
9	Junko Yoshida (JPN)	Asia	56.00	1	

=== 800 m ===
==== Men ====
4 September

Rank	Athlete	Team	Time	Points	Notes
1	Sebastian Coe (GBR)	Europe	1:46.16	9	
2	James Robinson	United States	1:47.31	8	
3	Detlef Wagenknecht	East Germany	1:47.49	7	
4	Mike Hillardt (AUS)	Oceania	1:47.59	6	
5	Omer Khalifa (SUD)	Africa	1:47.63	5	
6	Joaquim Cruz (BRA)	Americas	1:47.77	4	
7	Carlo Grippo	Italy	1:47.79	3	
8	Nikolay Kirov	Soviet Union	1:48.15	2	
9	Abraham Rajan (IND)	Asia	1:53.21	1	

==== Women ====
5 September

Rank	Athlete	Team	Time	Points	Notes
1	Lyudmila Veselkova	Soviet Union	1:57.48	9	
2	Martina Steuk	East Germany	1:58.31	8	
3	Jolanta Januchta (POL)	Europe	1:58.32	7	
4	Gabriella Dorio	Italy	1:59.43	6	
5	Terri-Anne Cater (AUS)	Oceania	2:00.56	5	
6	Madeline Manning	United States	2:01.79	4	
7	Brit McRoberts (CAN)	Americas	2:02.19	3	
8	Mary Chemweno (KEN)	Africa	2:05.73	2	
9	Geeta Zutshi (IND)	Asia	2:09.56	1	

=== 1500 m ===
==== Men ====
5 September

Rank	Athlete	Team	Time	Points	Notes
1	Steve Ovett (GBR)	Europe	3:34.95	9	
2	John Walker (NZL)	Oceania	3:35.49	8	
3	Olaf Beyer	East Germany	3:35.58	7	
4	Mike Boit (KEN)	Africa	3:35.73	6	
5	Sydney Maree	United States	3:36.56	5	
6	Nikolay Kirov	Soviet Union	3:38.05	4	
7	Claudio Patrignani	Italy	3:39.41	3	
8	John Craig (CAN)	Americas	3:39.86	2	
9	Takahashi Ishii (JPN)	Asia	3:40.93	1	

==== Women ====
4 September

Rank	Athlete	Team	Time	Points	Notes
1	Tamara Sorokina	Soviet Union	4:03.33	9	
2	Gabriella Dorio	Italy	4:03.75	8	
3	Ulrike Bruns	East Germany	4:04.67	7	
4	Anna Bukis (POL)	Europe	4:06.72	6	
5	Jan Merrill	United States	4:08.98	5	
6	Brit McRoberts (CAN)	Americas	4:09.66	4	
7	Mary Chemweno (KEN)	Africa	4:10.49	3	
8	Dianne Rodger (NZL)	Oceania	4:19.98	2	
9	Zhang Xiuyun (CHN)	Asia	4:26.97	1	

=== 5000/3000 m ===
==== Men ====
6 September

Rank	Athlete	Team	Time	Points	Notes
1	Eamonn Coghlan (IRL)	Europe	14:08.39	9	
2	Hansjörg Kunze	East Germany	14:08.54	8	
3	Vittorio Fontanella	Italy	14:09.06	7	
4	Valeriy Abramov	Soviet Union	14:09.85	6	
5	Tolossa Kotu (ETH)	Africa	14:11.14	5	
6	Matt Centrowitz	United States	14:11.14	4	
7	Gopal Singh Saini (IND)	Asia	14:14.88	3	
8	Paul Williams (CAN)	Americas	14:24.21	2	
9	Peter Renner (NZL)	Oceania	14:31.67	1	

==== Women ====
6 September

Rank	Athlete	Team	Time	Points	Notes
1	Angelika Zauber	East Germany	8:54.89	9	
2	Maricica Puică (ROM)	Europe	8:55.80	8	
3	Silvana Cruciata	Italy	8:57.10	7	
4	Tatyana Pozdnyakova	Soviet Union	9:02.95	6	
5	Brenda Webb	United States	9:13.10	5	
6	Justina Chepchirchir (KEN)	Africa	9:18.80	4	
7	Barbara Moore (NZL)	Oceania	9:18.83	3	
8	Akemi Masuda (JPN)	Asia	9:58.07	2	
9	Angelita Lind (PUR)	Americas	10:20.92	1	

=== 10,000 m ===
==== Men ====
4 September

Rank	Athlete	Team	Time	Points	Notes
1	Werner Schildhauer	East Germany	27:38.43	9	NR
2	Mohamed Kedir (ETH)	Africa	27:39.44	8	
3	Alberto Salazar	United States	27:40.69	7	
4	Venanzio Ortis	Italy	27:42.70	6	
5	Martti Vainio (FIN)	Europe	27:48.62	5	
6	Toomas Turb	Soviet Union	27:54.18	4	
7	Kunimitsu Itō (JPN)	Asia	28:35.95	3	
8	Steve Austin (AUS)	Oceania	28:51.70	2	
9	Peter Butler (CAN)	Americas	29:47.05	1	

=== 110/100 m hurdles ===
==== Men ====
6 September
Wind: -0.2 m/s

Rank	Athlete	Team	Time	Points	Notes
1	Greg Foster	United States	13.32	9	
2	Alejandro Casañas (CUB)	Americas	13.36	8	
3	Július Ivan (TCH)	Europe	13.66	7	
4	Andreas Schlißke	East Germany	13.72	6	
5	Yuriy Chervanyov	Soviet Union	13.76	5	
6	Daniele Fontecchio	Italy	13.90	4	
7	Tim Soper (NZL)	Oceania	14.31	3	
8	Yoshifumi Fujimori (JPN)	Asia	14.31	2	
9	Charles Kokoyo (KEN)	Africa	14.63	1	

==== Women ====
5 September
Wind: +0.1 m/s

Rank	Athlete	Team	Time	Points	Notes
1	Tatyana Anisimova	Soviet Union	12.85	9	
2	Kerstin Knabe	East Germany	12.91	8	
3	Lucyna Langer (POL)	Europe	12.97	7	
4	Stephanie Hightower	United States	13.09	6	
5	Penny Gillies (AUS)	Oceania	13.59	5	
6	Patrizia Lombardo	Italy	13.68	4	
7	Grisel Machado (CUB)	Americas	13.76	3	
8	Emi Akimoto (JPN)	Asia	13.97	2	
9	Cécile Ngambi (CMR)	Africa	14.16	1	

=== 400 m hurdles ===
==== Men ====
4 September

Rank	Athlete	Team	Time	Points	Notes
1	Edwin Moses	United States	47.37	9	
2	Volker Beck	East Germany	49.16	8	
3	Harry Schulting (NED)	Europe	49.69	7	
4	Vasiliy Arkhipenko	Soviet Union	49.85	6	
5	António Ferreira (BRA)	Americas	50.45	5	
6	Garry Brown (AUS)	Oceania	50.59	4	
7	Saverio Gellini	Italy	50.69	3	
8	Takashi Nagao (JPN)	Asia	51.95	2	
9	Jackson Melly (KEN)	Africa	52.90	1	

==== Women ====
4 September

Rank	Athlete	Team	Time	Points	Notes
1	Ellen Neumann	East Germany	54.82	9	
2	Genowefa Błaszak (POL)	Europe	56.20	8	
3	Anna Kastetskaya	Soviet Union	56.37	7	
4	Lynette Foreman (AUS)	Oceania	57.51	6	
5	Giuseppina Cirulli	Italy	58.11	5	
6	Mercedes Mesa (CUB)	Americas	59.53	4	
7	Sandy Myers	United States	59.95	3	
8	Yumiko Aoi (JPN)	Asia	1:01.72	2	
9	Célestine N'Drin (CIV)	Africa	1:04.68	1	

=== 3000 m steeplechase ===
==== Men ====
5 September

Rank	Athlete	Team	Time	Points	Notes
1	Bogusław Mamiński (POL)	Europe	8:19.89	9	
2	Mariano Scartezzini	Italy	8:19.93	8	
3	Masanari Shintaku (JPN)	Asia	8:23.64	7	
4	Ralf Pönitzsch	East Germany	8:24.13	6	
5	Gregory Duhaime (CAN)	Americas	8:25.12	5	
6	Sergey Yepishin	Soviet Union	8:28.78	4	
7	Eshetu Tura (ETH)	Africa	8:35.23	3	
8	Peter Larkins (AUS)	Oceania	8:39.63	2	
	Henry Marsh	United States	DQ	0	

=== 4 × 100 m relay ===
==== Men ====
5 September

Rank	Team	Athletes	Time	Points	Notes
1	Europe	Krzysztof Zwoliński (POL), Zenon Licznerski (POL), Leszek Dunecki (POL), Marian Woronin (POL)	38.73	9	
2	East Germany	Frank Hollender, Detlef Kübeck, Bernhard Hoff, Frank Emmelmann	38.79	8	
3	United States	Mel Lattany, Anthony Ketchum, Stanley Floyd, Steve Williams	38.85	7	
4	Soviet Union	Yuriy Naumenko, Nikolay Sidorov, Aleksandr Aksinin, Vladimir Muravyov	39.04	6	
5	Americas	Desai Williams (CAN), Colin Bradford (JAM), Don Quarrie (JAM), Ben Johnson (CAN)	39.13	5	
6	Italy	Pierfrancesco Pavoni, Giovanni Bongiorni, Diego Nodari, Carlo Simionato	39.67	4	
7	Asia	Toshio Toyota (JPN), Hideyuki Arikawa (JPN), Hideki Ikeda (JPN), Hirohito Yamazaki (JPN)	40.07	3	
8	Oceania	Gerrard Keating (AUS), Shane Downey (NZL), James Kelly (AUS), Peter Van Miltenberg (AUS)	40.85	2	
	Africa	Amadou Meité (CIV), Théophile Nkounkou (CGO), Degnan Kablan (CIV), Ernest Obeng (GHA)	DQ	0	

==== Women ====
6 September

Rank	Team	Athletes	Time	Points	Notes
1	East Germany	Kirsten Siemon, Bärbel Wöckel, Gesine Walther, Marlies Göhr	42.22	9	
2	United States	Alice Brown, Jeanette Bolden, Florence Griffith, Evelyn Ashford	42.82	8	
3	Soviet Union	Olga Zolotaryova, Olga Nasonova, Lyudmila Kondratyeva, Natalya Bochina	43.01	7	
4	Americas	Leleith Hodges (JAM), Jackie Pusey (JAM), Angela Bailey (CAN), Angella Taylor (CAN)	43.06	6	
5	Oceania	Wendy Brown (NZL), Kerrie Waite (AUS), Penny Gillies (AUS), Helen Edwards (AUS)	44.99	5	
6	Italy	Antonella Capriotti, Carla Mercurio, Patrizia Lombardo, Marisa Masullo	45.01	4	
7	Africa	Nawal El Moutawakel (MAR), Cécile Ngambi (CMR), Alice Adala (KEN), Hannah Afriyie (GHA)	46.15	3	
8	Asia	Tomi Osako (JPN), Yukiko Osako (JPN), Emiko Konishi (JPN), Emi Akimoto (JPN)	46.45	2	
	Europe	Wendy Hoyte (GBR), Kathy Smallwood (GBR), Beverley Callender (GBR), Shirley Thomas (GBR)	DNF	0	

=== 4 × 400 m relay ===
==== Men ====
6 September

Rank	Team	Athletes	Time	Points	Notes
1	United States	Walter McCoy, Cliff Wiley, Willie Smith, Tony Darden	2:59.12	9	WL
2	Europe	Eric Josjö (SWE), Fons Brijdenbach (BEL), Koen Gijsbers (NED), Hartmut Weber (FRG)	3:01.47	8	
3	Americas	Héctor Daley (PAN), Colin Bradford (JAM), Mike Paul (TRI), Bert Cameron (JAM)	3:02.01	7	
4	Soviet Union	Pavel Roshchin, Viktor Burakov, Vitaliy Fyodotov, Viktor Markin	3:02.93	6	
5	Italy	Stefano Malinverni, Roberto Tozzi, Alfonso Di Guida, Mauro Zuliani	3:03.23	5	
6	East Germany	Frank Schaffer, Carsten Petters, Volker Beck, Andreas Knebel	3:03.63	4	
7	Africa	Brahim Ammour (ALG), Degnan Kablan (CIV), Sammy Koskei (KEN), James Atuti (KEN)	3:05.55	3	
8	Oceania	Gary Minihan (AUS), John Fleming (AUS), Peter Van Miltenberg (AUS), Michael Willis (AUS)	3:07.11	2	
9	Asia	Eiji Natori (JPN), Takayuki Isobe (JPN), Shigenobu Omori (JPN), Takashi Nagao (JPN)	3:09.93	1	

==== Women ====
4 September

Rank	Team	Athletes	Time	Points	Notes
1	East Germany	Dagmar Rübsam, Martina Steuk, Bärbel Wöckel, Marita Koch	3:20.62	9	
2	Europe	Michelle Scutt (GBR), Verona Elder (GBR), Joslyn Hoyte-Smith (GBR), Jarmila Kratochvílová (TCH)	3:23.03	8	
3	Americas	Charmaine Crooks (CAN), Jackie Pusey (JAM), Marita Payne (CAN), June Griffith (GUY)	3:26.42	7	
4	Soviet Union	Nadyezhda Lyalina, Irina Baskakova, Tatyana Litvinova, Irina Nazarova	3:26.92	6	
5	United States	Delisa Walton, Lorna Forde, Arlise Emerson, Denean Howard	3:30.72	5	
6	Italy	Patrizia Lombardo, Morena Pistrino, Giuseppina Cirulli, Erica Rossi	3:36.50	4	
7	Oceania	Leanne Evans (AUS), Lynette Foreman (AUS), Gail Millar (AUS), Marian O'Shaughnessy (AUS)	3:37.27	3	
8	Asia	Lydia de Vega (PHI), Junko Yoshida (JPN), Gao Yanqing (CHN), Saik Oik Cum (MAS)	3:47.64	2	
9	Africa	Marième Boye (SEN), Célestine N'Drin (CIV), Regine Dramiga (UGA), Ruth Atuki (KEN)	3:49.13	1	

=== High jump ===
==== Men ====
6 September

Rank	Athlete	Team	Result	Points	Notes
1	Tyke Peacock	United States	2.28	9	
2	Gerd Nagel (FRG)	Europe	2.26	8	
3	Jörg Freimuth	East Germany	2.24	7	
4	Valeriy Sereda	Soviet Union	2.18	6	
5	Milton Ottey (CAN)	Americas	2.15	5	
6	Massimo Di Giorgio	Italy	2.15	4	
7	Amadou Dia Ba (SEN)	Africa	2.15	3	
8	David Hoyle (AUS)	Oceania	2.10	2	
9	Zhu Jianhua (CHN)	Asia	2.10	1	

==== Women ====
4 September

Rank	Athlete	Team	Result	Points	Notes
1	Ulrike Meyfarth (FRG)	Europe	1.96	9	
2	Tamara Bykova	Soviet Union	1.96	8	
3	Pam Spencer	United States	1.92	7	
4	Christine Stanton (AUS)	Oceania	1.86	6	
5	Alessandra Fossati	Italy	1.86	4.5	
5	Jutta Kirst	East Germany	1.86	4.5	
7	Hisayo Fukumitsu (JPN)	Asia	1.83	3	
8	Silvia Costa (CUB)	Americas	1.83	2	
9	Kawther Akrémi (TUN)	Africa	1.60	1	

=== Pole vault ===
==== Men ====
5 September

Rank	Athlete	Team	Result	Points	Notes
1	Konstantin Volkov	Soviet Union	5.70	9	
2	Jean-Michel Bellot (FRA)	Europe	5.55	8	
3	Billy Olson	United States	5.50	7	
4	Tomomi Takahashi (JPN)	Asia	5.40	6	
5	Axel Weber	East Germany	5.30	5	
6	Mauro Barella	Italy	5.20	4	
7	Rubén Camino (CUB)	Americas	5.20	3	
8	Kieran McKee (NZL)	Oceania	4.70	2	
9	Mohammed Ben Saad (ALG)	Africa	4.50	1	

=== Long jump ===
==== Men ====
4 September

Rank	Athlete	Team	Result	Points	Notes
1	Carl Lewis	United States	8.15	9	
2	Gary Honey (AUS)	Oceania	8.11	8	NR
3	Shamil Abbyasov	Soviet Union	7.95	7	
4	Liu Yuhuang (CHN)	Asia	7.89	6	
5	Uwe Lange	East Germany	7.71	5	
6	Giovanni Evangelisti	Italy	7.67	4	
7	László Szalma (HUN)	Europe	7.65	3	
8	Charlton Ehizuelen (NGR)	Africa	7.47	2	
9	Ubaldo Duany (CUB)	Americas	5.37	1	

==== Women ====
6 September

Rank	Athlete	Team	Result	Points	Notes
1	Sigrid Ulbricht	East Germany	6.80	9	
2	Jodi Anderson	United States	6.61	8	
3	Anna Włodarczyk (POL)	Europe	6.59	7	
4	Tatyana Skachko	Soviet Union	6.49	6	
5	Shonel Ferguson (BAH)	Americas	6.34	5	
6	Linda Garden (AUS)	Oceania	6.10	4	
7	Barbara Norello	Italy	6.01	3	
8	Wu Feng (CHN)	Asia	5.76	2	
9	Jeanette Yawson (GHA)	Africa	5.70	1	

=== Triple jump ===
==== Men ====
5 September

Rank	Athlete	Team	Result	Points	Notes
1	João Carlos de Oliveira (BRA)	Americas	17.37	9	
2	Zou Zhenxian (CHN)	Asia	17.34	8	AR
3	Willie Banks	United States	17.04	7	
4	Jaak Uudmäe	Soviet Union	16.83	6	
5	Béla Bakosi (HUN)	Europe	16.70	5	
6	Ken Lorraway (AUS)	Oceania	16.70	4	
7	Lutz Dombrowski	East Germany	16.33	3	
8	Ajayi Agbebaku (NGR)	Africa	16.14	2	
9	Paolo Piapan	Italy	15.38	1	

=== Shot put ===
==== Men ====
4 September

Rank	Athlete	Team	Result	Points	Notes
1	Udo Beyer	East Germany	21.40	9	
2	Yevgeniy Mironov	Soviet Union	20.34	8	
3	Dave Laut	United States	19.90	7	
4	Ralf Reichenbach (FRG)	Europe	19.18	6	
5	Bishop Dolegiewicz (CAN)	Americas	18.88	5	
6	Nagui Asaad (EGY)	Africa	18.76	4	
7	Alessandro Andrei	Italy	18.37	3	
8	Philip Nettle (AUS)	Oceania	17.20	2	
	Mohamed Al-Zinkawi (KUW)	Asia	NM	0	

==== Women ====
5 September

Rank	Athlete	Team	Result	Points	Notes
1	Ilona Slupianek	East Germany	20.60	9	
2	Helena Fibingerová (TCH)	Europe	19.92	8	
3	María Elena Sarría (CUB)	Americas	19.21	7	
4	Nina Isayeva	Soviet Union	18.08	6	
5	Cinzia Petrucci	Italy	17.77	5	
6	Shen Lijuan (CHN)	Asia	17.09	4	
7	Denise Wood	United States	16.00	3	
8	Christine Schulz (AUS)	Oceania	14.38	2	
9	Odette Mistoul (GAB)	Africa	13.56	1	

=== Discus throw ===
==== Men ====
4 September

Rank	Athlete	Team	Result	Points	Notes
1	Armin Lemme	East Germany	66.38	9	
2	Luis Delís (CUB)	Americas	66.26	8	
3	Imrich Bugár (TCH)	Europe	64.38	7	
4	Dmitry Kovtsun	Soviet Union	62.82	6	
5	Armando De Vincentiis	Italy	58.14	5	
6	Mohammed Naguib (EGY)	Africa	57.94	4	
7	Li Weinan (CHN)	Asia	54.52	3	
8	Robin Tait (NZL)	Oceania	53.24	2	

==== Women ====
6 September

Rank	Athlete	Team	Result	Points	Notes
1	Evelin Jahl	East Germany	66.70	9	
2	Mariya Petkova (BUL)	Europe	66.30	8	
3	Galina Savinkova	Soviet Union	63.96	7	
4	Carmen Romero (CUB)	Americas	61.60	6	
5	Li Xiaohui (CHN)	Asia	55.70	5	
6	Leslie Deniz	United States	53.20	4	
7	Maristella Bano	Italy	50.30	3	
8	Andrina Rovis-Herman (AUS)	Oceania	45.80	2	
9	Zoubida Laayouni (MAR)	Africa	45.24	1	

=== Hammer throw ===
==== Men ====
5 September

Rank	Athlete	Team	Result	Points	Notes
1	Yuriy Sedykh	Soviet Union	77.42	9	
2	Karl-Hans Riehm (FRG)	Europe	75.60	8	
3	Giampaolo Urlando	Italy	71.92	7	
4	Scott Neilson (CAN)	Americas	67.56	6	
5	Dave McKenzie	United States	66.72	5	
6	Shigenobu Murofushi (JPN)	Asia	66.64	4	
7	Roland Steuk	East Germany	65.74	3	
8	Hakim Toumi (ALG)	Africa	59.80	2	
9	Agostino Puopolo (AUS)	Oceania	56.18	1	

=== Javelin throw ===
==== Men ====
4 September

Rank	Athlete	Team	Result	Points	Notes
1	Dainis Kula	Soviet Union	89.74	9	
2	Detlef Michel	East Germany	89.38	8	
3	Pentti Sinersaari (FIN)	Europe	83.26	7	
4	Rod Ewaliko	United States	82.24	6	
5	Agostino Ghesini	Italy	80.96	5	
6	Mike O'Rourke (NZL)	Oceania	79.78	4	
7	Shen Maomao (CHN)	Asia	79.08	3	
8	Justin Arop (UGA)	Africa	77.76	2	
9	Dionisio Quintana (CUB)	Americas	77.28	1	

==== Women ====
6 September

Rank	Athlete	Team	Result	Points	Notes
1	Antoaneta Todorova (BUL)	Europe	70.08	9	
2	Petra Felke	East Germany	66.60	8	
3	Karin Smith	United States	63.04	7	
4	Petra Rivers (AUS)	Oceania	61.54	6	
5	Mayra Vila (CUB)	Americas	59.00	5	
6	Leolita Blodniece	Soviet Union	57.06	4	
7	Tang Guoli (CHN)	Asia	56.66	3	
8	Fausta Quintavalla	Italy	52.80	2	
9	Agnès Tchuinté (CMR)	Africa	52.56	1	
