= Athletics at the 1978 Asian Games =

- Venue: National Stadium
- Dates: 14–19 December 1978

The 1978 Asian Games were held in National Stadium, Bangkok, Thailand from 14 December to 19 December. The event was not sanctioned by the International Amateur Athletics Federation due to the organizers' refusal to invite Israel.

== Medalists ==
=== Men ===
Event	Gold		Silver		Bronze	
100 m	Suchart Jairsuraparp; Thailand	10.44	Ramaswamy Gnanasekaran; India	10.60	Seo Mal-gu; South Korea	10.66
200 m	Ramaswamy Gnanasekaran; India	21.42	Yasuhiro Harada; Japan	21.54	Anat Ratanapol; Thailand	21.59
400 m	Abbas Laibi; Iraq	46.71	Uday K. Prabhu; India	46.79	Murali Kuttan; India	47.18
800 m	Sriram Singh; India	1:48.8	Falah Naji; Iraq	1:49.7	Takashi Ishii; Japan	1:49.9
1500 m	Takashi Ishii; Japan	3:47.5	Muhammad Younis; Pakistan	3:48.0	Ratan Singh Bhadauria; India	3:48.1
5000 m	Hari Chand; India	14:22.0	Takao Nakamura; Japan	14:27.2	Cui Yulin; China	14:28.1
10,000 m	Hari Chand; India	30:07.7	Robert; Burma	30:16.9	Ko Ko; Burma	30:18.4
110 m hurdles	Wang Xunhua; China	14.28	Yoshifumi Fujimori; Japan	14.33	Satbir Singh; India	14.43
400 m hurdles	Hassan Kadhim; Iraq	50.81; GR	Takashi Nagao; Japan	50.98	Talib Faisal; Iraq	51.24
3000 m steeplechase	Masanari Shintaku; Japan	8:40.7; GR	Gopal Saini; India	8:44.8	Hitoshi Iwabuchi; Japan	8:46.2
4 × 100 m relay	Thailand; Somsak Boontud; Suchart Jairsuraparp; Kanoksak Chaisanont; Anat Ratanapol	40.32	Japan; Yasuhiro Harada; Junichi Usui; Susumu Shimizu; Akira Harada	40.33	China; Yuan Guoqiang; Fan Xinwen; Zhao Jingyu; Zou Zhenxian	40.54
4 × 400 m relay	Japan; Eiji Natori; Junichi Usui; Yasuhiro Harada; Takashi Nagao	3:08.3	India; Murali Kuttan; Harkamaljit Singh; Uday K. Prabhu; Sriram Singh	3:08.4	Iraq; Talib Faisal; Abbas Laibi; Hassan Kadhim; Fahim Abdul-Sada	3:09.4
Marathon	Mineteru Sakamoto; Japan	2:15:29.7; GR	Choe Chang-sop; North Korea	2:15:57.4	Koh Chun-son; North Korea	2:16:10.3
20 km walk	Hakam Singh; India	1:31:54.4; GR	Vellasamy Subramaniam; Malaysia	1:31:58.8	Khoo Chong Beng; Malaysia	1:33:56.8
High jump	Takao Sakamoto; Japan	2.20	Kazunori Koshikawa; Japan	2.18	Cui Hongjun; China	2.18
Pole vault	Tomomi Takahashi; Japan	5.10; GR	Chen Guanghui; China	5.05	Yasuhiro Kigawa; Japan	5.00
Long jump	Suresh Babu; India	7.85	Junichi Usui; Japan	7.76	Toshihisa Yoshimoto; Japan	7.75
Triple jump	Masami Nakanishi; Japan	16.56; GR	Zou Zhenxian; China	16.47	Zhou Jianguo; China	16.29
Shot put	Bahadur Singh Chauhan; India	17.61	Zhao Baoqin; China	17.44	Mohammad Al-Zinkawi; Kuwait	17.40
Discus throw	Li Weinan; China	56.26	Li Jianguo; China	55.26	Kiyotaka Kawasaki; Japan	53.32
Hammer throw	Shigenobu Murofushi; Japan	68.26; GR	Yoji Kitano; Japan	63.96	Ji Shaoming; China	63.34
Javelin throw	Shen Maomao; China	79.24; GR	Toshihiko Takeda; Japan	71.60	Ding Penglin; China	70.70
Decathlon	Hisashi Iwai; Japan	7003	Prapant Srisathorn; Thailand	6833	Jin Xuewei; China	6743

=== Women ===
Event	Gold		Silver		Bronze	
100 m	Yin Yaping; China	12.20	Yukiko Osako; Japan	12.21	Usanee Laopinkarn; Thailand	12.22
200 m	Usanee Laopinkarn; Thailand	24.81	Lee Eun-ja; South Korea	24.99	Junko Kushibuchi; Japan	25.05
400 m	Saik Oik Cum; Malaysia	55.09	Keiko Nagasawa; Japan	55.74	Gao Yanqing; China	56.23
800 m	Geeta Zutshi; India	2:07.7	Jung Dong-sun; North Korea	2:07.9	Chang Yong-ae; North Korea	2:08.3
1500 m	Kim Ok-sun; North Korea	4:18.9; GR	Geeta Zutshi; India	4:28.2	Choi Yung-ran; North Korea	4:33.3
3000 m	Kim Ok-sun; North Korea	9:24.7; GR	Lu Hongxiang; China	9:35.4	Yang Yanying; China	9:36.5
100 m hurdles	Dai Jianhua; China	13.95	Tamie Motegi; Japan	14.23	Xie Lizhen; China	14.55
400 m hurdles	Chen Xin; China	1:01.32; GR	Li Sulan; China	1:01.89	Masae Kiguchi; Japan	1:02.09
4 × 100 m relay	Thailand; Buspranee Ratanapol; Walapa Pinij; Pusadee Sangvijit; Usanee Laopinkarn	46.20; GR	Japan; Emiko Konishi; Junko Kushibuchi; Yukiko Osako; Tomoko Maeda	46.78	Philippines; Amelita Saberon; Lorena Morcilla; Lucila Tolentino; Lydia Silva-Netto	47.00
4 × 400 m relay	Japan; Keiko Nagasawa; Mayumi Kubota; Tomoko Maeda; Masae Kiguchi	3:46.29	China; Gao Yanqing; Liang Lihua; Guo Guimei; Zhang Huifen	3:46.87	North Korea; Jang Geun-ok; Chang Yong-ae; Jung Dong-sun; Kim Ok-sun	3:48.78
High jump	Zheng Dazhen; China	1.88; GR	Tamami Yagi; Japan	1.82	Yang Wenqin; China	1.80
Long jump	Zou Wa; China	6.28	Angel Mary Joseph; India	6.05	Sumie Awara; Japan	6.05
Shot put	Shen Lijuan; China	17.70; GR	Lü Cheng; China	16.72	Kayoko Hayashi; Japan	15.59
Discus throw	Li Xiaohui; China	55.92; GR	Wang Dan; China	51.22	Matsuko Takahashi; Japan	47.22
Javelin throw	Yao Ruiying; China	57.22; GR	Naomi Shibusawa; Japan	54.98	Li Xia; China	54.08
Pentathlon	Ye Peisu; China	4133	Angel Mary Joseph; India	3837	Guo Yu; China	3731

== Medal table ==
Rank	Nation	Gold	Silver	Bronze	Total
1	China (CHN)	12	9	13	34
2	Japan (JPN)	10	15	10	35
3	India (IND)	8	7	3	18
4	Thailand (THA)	4	1	2	7
5	North Korea (PRK)	2	2	4	8
6	Iraq (IRQ)	2	1	2	5
7	Malaysia (MAL)	1	1	1	3
8	Burma (BIR)	0	1	1	2
8	South Korea (KOR)	0	1	1	2
10	Pakistan (PAK)	0	1	0	1
11	Kuwait (KUW)	0	0	1	1
11	Philippines (PHI)	0	0	1	1
Totals (12 entries)		39	39	39	117
