= 1977 Pacific Conference Games =

III Pacific Conference Games
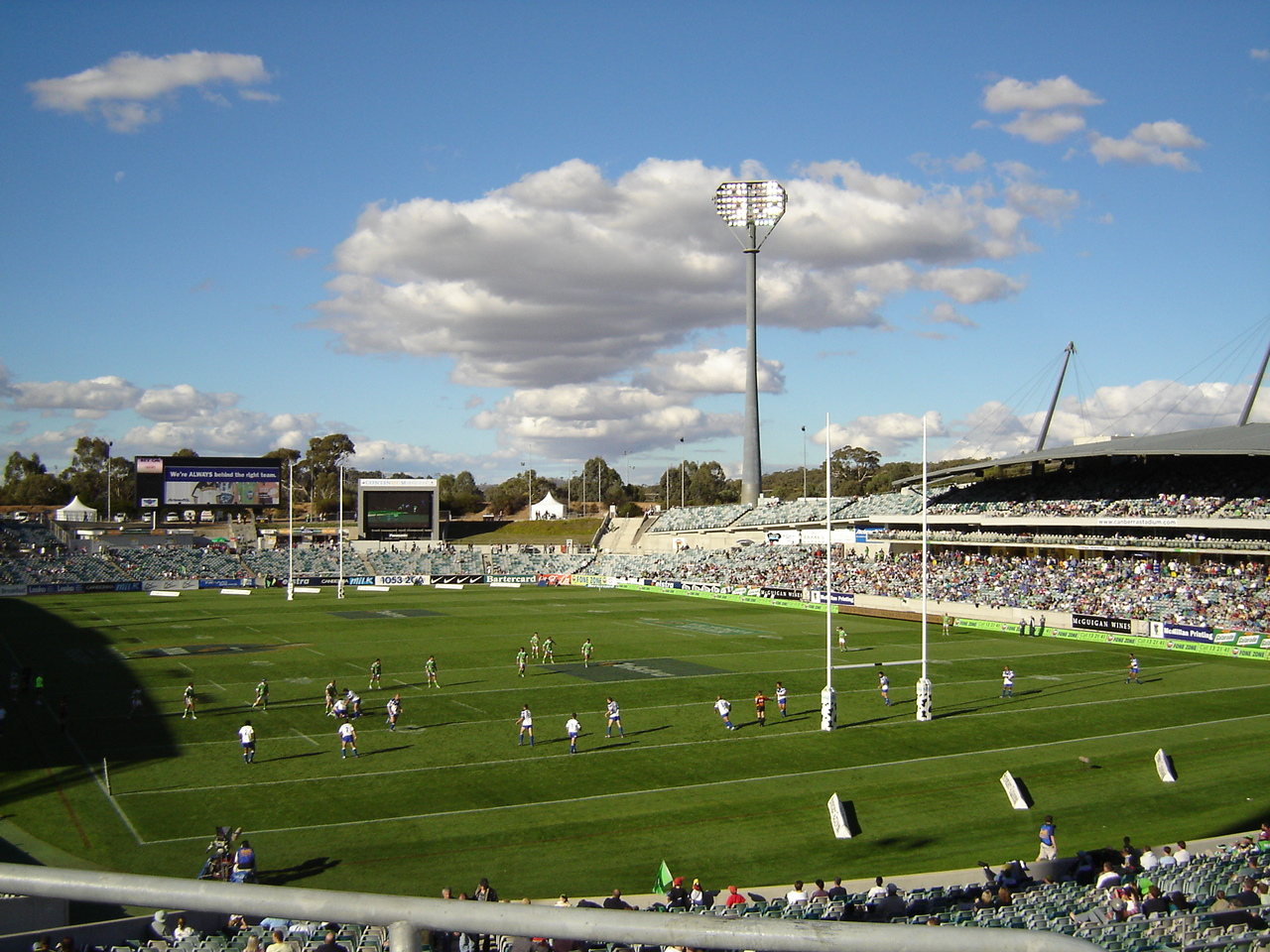
- The host stadium in 2005 after being converted
- Dates: 3 and 4 December
- Host city: Canberra, Australia
- Venue: Bruce Stadium
- Events: 34

The 1977 Pacific Conference Games was the third edition of the international athletics competition between five Pacific coast nations: Australia, Canada, Japan, New Zealand and the United States. It was held on 3 and 4 December in Canberra, Australia. A total of 20 men's and 14 women's athletics events were contested. Two new women's events were added to the programme of the previous edition: the 400 metres hurdles and the 4×400 metres relay. The relay event had gained Olympic status in 1972, but the inclusion of the women's hurdles event was ahead of its time as it was not held at the Olympics until seven years later.

It marked the first major international athletics event to be held in the country since the 1962 British Empire and Commonwealth Games. The venue, Bruce Stadium, was purpose-built for the competition and represented a new, modern stadium for the sport in Australia. The stadium later went on to host the 1985 IAAF World Cup. The area's sporting reputation grew with the opening of the Australian Institute of Sport nearby in 1981.

== Medal summary ==
=== Men ===
Event	Gold		Silver		Bronze	
100 metres	Paul Narracott (AUS)	10.52	Bill Collins (USA)	10.69	Fred Lehmann (AUS)	10.77
200 metres	Bill Collins (USA)	20.83	Paul Narracott (AUS)	21.06	Toshio Toyota (JPN)	21.28
400 metres	Bevan Smith (NZL)	46.27	Jim O'Sullivan (AUS)	46.35	Mike Willis (AUS)	46.93
800 metres	Chum Darvall (AUS)	1:47.88	John Higham (AUS)	1:48.54	Takashi Ishii (JPN)	1:48.93
1500 metres	Takashi Ishii (JPN)	3:45.08	Graham Crouch (AUS)	3:45.17	Geoff Shaw (NZL)	3:45.94
5000 metres	David Fitzsimons (AUS)	13:45.15	Geoff Shaw (NZL)	13:50.66	Dave Hill (CAN)	13:55.22
10,000 metres	Rob de Castella (AUS)	29:23.66	Greg Fredericks (USA)	29:28.93	Peter Butler (CAN)	30:20.02
110 m hurdles	Warren Parr (AUS)	14.21	Charles Foster (USA)	14.21	Don Wright (AUS)	14.25
400 m hurdles	Garry Brown (AUS)	51.89	Sam Turner (USA)	53.08	Takashi Nagao (JPN)	53.30
3000 metres steeplechase	Ron Addison (USA)	8:38.16	Masanari Shintaku (JPN)	8:44.44	Bob Hendy (AUS)	8:55.46
4 × 100 m relay	United States (USA)	38.85	Japan (JPN)	39.54	Australia (AUS); Fred Lehmann; Paul Narracott; Jim O'Sullivan; Don Wright	39.96
4 × 400 m relay	United States (USA)	3:07.26	Japan (JPN)	3:08.01	Australia (AUS); Chum Darvall; Paul Narracott; Jim O'Sullivan; Mike Willis	3:11.18
High jump	Kazunori Koshikawa (JPN)	2.17 m	Ron Livers (USA)	2.13 m	Moriichi Takako (JPN)	2.10 m
Pole vault	Bruce Simpson (CAN)	5.25 m	Ray Boyd (AUS)	5.05 m	Yasuhiro Kigawa (JPN)	5.00 m
Long jump	Chris Commons (AUS)	8.08w m	Kashira Machida (JPN)	7.64 m w	Glenn Stewart (AUS)	7.59 m
Triple jump	Ron Livers (USA)	16.63 m	Yasushi Ueta (JPN)	16.35 m	Milan Tiff (USA)	16.32 m
Shot put	Colin Anderson (USA)	19.62 m	Bruno Pauletto (CAN)	18.43 m	Yuzo Koyama (JPN)	15.44 m
Discus throw	Dan Gardner (USA)	57.54 m	Kiyotaka Kawasaki (JPN)	57.44 m	Wayne Martin (AUS)	51.66 m
Hammer throw	Peter Farmer (AUS)	67.62 m	Yoji Kitano (JPN)	62.82 m	Murray Cheater (NZL)	61.06 m
Javelin throw	Phil Olsen (CAN)	80.98 m	Mike O'Rourke (NZL)	74.32 m	John Corazza (CAN)	73.54 m

=== Women ===
Event	Gold		Silver		Bronze	
100 metres	Denise Robertson (AUS)	11.67	Debbie Wells (AUS)	11.79	Wendy Brown (NZL)	11.91
200 metres	Denise Robertson (AUS)	22.87	Debbie Wells (AUS)	23.64	Kim Robertson (NZL)	23.68
400 metres	Verna Burnard (AUS)	52.63	Sharon Dabney (USA)	53.03	Marian Fisher (AUS)	53.19
800 metres	Francie Larrieu (USA)	2:06.30	Michelle Green (NZL)	2:06.68	Alison Wrench (AUS)	2:07.22
1500 metres	Francie Larrieu (USA)	4:18.32	Debbie Pearson (CAN)	4:19.09	Debbie Campbell (CAN) Jan Healy (NZL)	4:26.82
100 m hurdles	Deby LaPlante (USA)	14.03	Cheryl Boswell (AUS)	14.35	Emi Akimoto (JPN)	14.44
400 m hurdles	Marian Fisher (AUS)	57.28	Francine Gendron (CAN)	58.40	Carmen Campton (AUS)	58.53
4 × 100 m relay	Australia (AUS); Denise Robertson; Lyn Jacenko; Marian Fisher; Debbie Wells	44.26	New Zealand (NZL)	44.95	Canada (CAN)	45.99
4 × 400 m relay	Australia (AUS); Denise Robertson; Verna Burnard; Carmen Campton; Marian Fisher	3:34.24	Canada (CAN)	3:37.94	New Zealand (NZL)	3:42.54
High jump	Debbie Brill (CAN)	1.88 m	Tamami Yagi (JPN)	1.82 m	Chris Annison (AUS)	1.80 m
Long jump	Lyn Jacenko (AUS)	6.59w m	Erica Hooker (AUS)	6.38 m	Noeline Hodgins (NZL)	6.18 m
Shot put	Gael Mulhall (AUS)	16.15 m	Kayoko Hayashi (JPN)	16.00 m	Lucette Moreau (CAN)	15.40 m
Discus throw	Jane Haist (CAN)	55.64 m	Gael Mulhall (AUS)	54.40 m	Lynne Winbigler (USA)	52.58 m
Javelin throw	Pam Matthews (AUS)	56.88 m	Karen Smith (USA)	54.50 m	Keiko Myogai (JPN)	49.90 m
