= Takashi Nagao =

Japanese hurdler

Personal information
- Born: 31 August 1957 (age 68)

Sport
- Sport: Track and field
Medal record
Representing Japan
Asian Games
Gold medal – first place	1978 Bangkok	4×400 m relay
Gold medal – first place	1982 New Delhi	400 m hurdles
Silver medal – second place	1978 Bangkok	400 m hurdles
Asian Championships
Gold medal – first place	1981 Tokyo	400 m hurdles
Gold medal – first place	1981 Tokyo	4×400 m
Silver medal – second place	1975 Seoul	4×400 m
Silver medal – second place	1979 Tokyo	400 m hurdles
Silver medal – second place	1979 Tokyo	4×400 m

Takashi Nagao (Japanese: 長尾隆史; born 31 August 1957) is a Japanese former track and field athlete who competed in the 400 metres hurdles. He was the gold medallist at the 1982 Asian Games and the 1981 Asian Athletics Championships, as well as runner-up at those tournaments in 1978 and 1979.

A three-time national champion at the Japan Championships in Athletics, his personal best for the 400 m hurdles was 49.59 seconds. He also twice represented Asia at the IAAF World Cup.

== Career ==
Nagao established himself among the top Asian hurdlers in the 1977 season. At the Japan Championships in Athletics that year he won the 400 m hurdles title in a time of 51.11 seconds – the best ever recorded by a Japanese athlete at the competition. He was unable to compete at the 1977 Asian Athletics Championships, as the even was cancelled due to the lack of support from the International Amateur Athletics Federation, following the exclusion of Israel from the tournament. Nagao competed at two major international events that year: he was Asia's selection for the 1977 IAAF World Cup, placing eighth, and was a bronze medallist at the 1977 Pacific Conference Games, finishing behind Australian Garry Brown and Sam Turner of the United States.

Nagao defended his national title in 1978 and was thus selected to represent Japan at the 1978 Asian Games. He reached the final and finished in a time of 50.98 seconds, taking runner-up spot behind Iraqi hurdler Hussein Kadhum. He teamed up for the 4×400 metres relay with sprinters Eiji Natori, Yasuhiro Harada and long jumper Junichi Usui and anchored the quartet to a gold medal, narrowly holding off India's 800 m Asian Games champion Sri Ram Singh. Nagao ran a lifetime best of 49.59 seconds in Tokyo in September that year – a time which placed him eleventh on the global seasonal rankings. He won a third consecutive national title in 1979, winning in a championship record of 51.09 seconds. He was a pick for the national team for the 1979 Asian Athletics Championships held in Tokyo. The Japanese duo of Nagao and Yukihiro Yoshimatsu reached the podium, with Kadhum retaining his position as the continent's best hurdler and Nagao again taking a silver medal. Yoshimatsu succeeded Nagao to the national title in 1980 (breaking his record as well).

Shigenori Ohmori was the new Japanese 400 m hurdles champion in 1981, but Nagao overhauled his national rival at the 1979 Asian Athletics Championships, running 50.32 seconds to top the podium in a championship record time. Ohmori and Yoshimatsu rounded out the podium to make it a Japanese medal sweep at the championships in Tokyo. Nagao was the first Japanese male athlete to win the championship title. Replacing Kadhum as the region's top hurdler, he was chosen for both the 400 m hurdles and the 4 × 400 m relay team for Asia at the 1981 IAAF World Cup.

Nagao failed to win the national championships in 1982, as Ohmori led the field for a second year running. However, Nagao maintained his dominance at continental level with a gold medal at the Asian Games in New Delhi. The final was a battle between the two Japanese and Nagao came out on top for a second Asian title, breaking the Asian Games record in the process with his effort of 50.60 seconds. In contrast to his unique Asian Championships win, Nagao's Asian Games title added to a long tradition of Japanese success in the 400 m hurdles, as he became the nation's fifth man to claim the gold. This proved to be the last major medal of his career and after the age of twenty-five he never managed to win another national title either.

== National titles ==
- Japan Championships in Athletics
  - 110 m hurdles: 1977, 1978, 1979

== International competitions ==
Year	Competition	Venue	Position	Event	Notes
1977	World Cup	Düsseldorf, Germany	8th	400 m hurdles	52.10
1977	Pacific Conference Games	Canberra, Australia	3rd	400 m hurdles	53.30
1978	Asian Games	Bangkok, Thailand	2nd	400 m hurdles	50.98
1978	Asian Games	Bangkok, Thailand	1st	4 × 400 m relay	3:08.3
1979	Asian Championships	Tokyo, Japan	2nd	400 m hurdles	51.53
1981	Asian Championships	Tokyo, Japan	1st	400 m hurdles	50.32
1981	World Cup	Rome, Italy	8th	400 m hurdles	51.95
1981	World Cup	Rome, Italy	9th	4 × 400 m relay	3:09.93
1982	Asian Games	New Delhi, India	1st	400 m hurdles	50.60
