= 1982 AAA Championships =

Outdoor track and field competition

- Dates: 24–25 July 1982
- Host city: London, England
- Venue: Crystal Palace National Sports Centre
- Level: Senior
- Type: Outdoor

The 1982 AAA Championships (sponsored by Robinsons Barley Water) was the 1982 edition of the annual outdoor track and field competition organised by the Amateur Athletic Association (AAA). It was held from 24 to 25 July 1982 at the Crystal Palace National Sports Centre in London, England.

== Summary ==
The Championships covered two days of competition. The marathon was held in Gateshead and the decathlon was held in Birmingham.

== Results ==
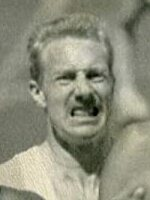
Peter Elliott

Event	Gold		Silver		Bronze	
100m	(Scotland) Cameron Sharp	10.31	Jim Evans	10.46	(Australia) Paul Narracott	10.50
200m	(Jamaica) Don Quarrie	20.74	Buster Watson	20.90	(Japan) Toshio Toyota	21.09
400m	(Trinidad and Tobago) Mike Paul	45.74	(Scotland) David Jenkins	45.93	Todd Bennett	46.11
800m	Peter Elliott	1:45.61	(New Zealand) John Walker	1:46.10	Chris McGeorge	1:46.30
1,500m	Steve Cram	3:36.14	(Scotland) Graham Williamson	3:39.07	(United States) Rich Harris	3:39.44
5,000m	(Kenya) Wilson Waigwa	13:29.32	Tim Hutchings	13:30.53	(United States) Steve Plasencia	13:31.55
10,000m	Julian Goater	28:02.45	(Wales) Steve Jones	28:08.75	Charlie Spedding	28:11.00
marathon	Steve Kenyon	2:11:40	Dave Cannon	2:12:49	Ian Ray	2:14:08
3000m steeplechase	(Wales) Roger Hackney	8:28.98	Graeme Fell	8:31.01	Barry Knight	8:32.13
110m hurdles	Mark Holtom	13.88	Wilbert Greaves	14.10	(Wales) Berwyn Price	14.22
400m hurdles	(United States) James King	50.25	(Australia) Garry Brown	50.85	(Japan) Shigenori Omori	51.11
3,000m walk	Roger Mills	11:58.18	Phil Vesty	12:02.04	Gordon Vale	12:16.41
10,000m walk	(Wales) Steve Barry	41:14.7 NR	Ian McCombie	42:32.8	Phil Vesty	42:46.3
high jump	(Japan) Takao Sakamoto	2.24	(Japan) Takashi Katamine	2.24	(Scotland) Geoff Parsons	2.18
pole vault	(Japan) Tomomi Takahashi	5.51	(United States) Mike Tully	5.40	Jeff Gutteridge	5.20
long jump	(Japan) Junichi Usui	7.94	John Herbert	7.94	(Norway) Niels Bugge	7.80
triple jump	(Australia) Ken Lorraway	17.19	John Herbert	16.91	(United States) Willie Banks	16.70
shot put	Mike Winch	18.90	Simon Rodhouse	18.20	Nick Tabor	17.40
discus throw	(The Bahamas) Brad Cooper	63.70	Bob Weir	58.14	Richard Slaney	56.92
hammer throw	Bob Weir	71.92	Martin Girvan	71.52	(Japan) Shigenobu Murofushi	70.52
javelin throw	David Ottley	80.54	John Trower	76.90	Peter Yates	75.52
decathlon	Fidelis Obikwu	7535	Pan Zeniou	7532	(Scotland) Brad McStravick	7467

== See also ==
- 1982 WAAA Championships
