= Emi Akimoto =

Japanese former track and field athlete

Medal record

Women's athletics

Representing Japan

Asian Games
Gold medal – first place	1982 New Delhi	100 m hurdles
Gold medal – first place	1982 New Delhi	4×100 m relay

Asian Championships
Gold medal – first place	1979 Tokyo	100 m hurdles
Gold medal – first place	1979 Tokyo	4×100 m
Gold medal – first place	1981 Tokyo	100 m hurdles
Gold medal – first place	1981 Tokyo	4×100 m
Gold medal – first place	1983 Kuwait City	100 m hurdles

Emi Akimoto (Japanese: 秋元恵美; born 19 July 1956) is a Japanese former track and field athlete who specialised in the 100 metres hurdles. She was the gold medallist in the event at the Asian Athletics Championships three times consecutively from 1979 to 1983, breaking the championship record each time. She won two gold medals at the Asian Games in 1982, running in the hurdles and 4×100 metres relay.

Akimoto was a six-time champion at the Japan Championships in Athletics. She represented her country at the 1983 World Championships in Athletics and ran for Asia at the IAAF World Cup in 1979 and 1981. She was also a two-time medallist at the Pacific Conference Games. In her later career she ran under her married name: Emi Sasaki (Japanese: 佐々木恵美).

== Career ==
=== Early life and career ===
Akimoto emerged as one of Japan's top female sprinters while still a high school student in the mid-1970s. At the 1975 Japan international indoor meet, she was second in the 50 metres, beaten only by two-time Olympian Mamie Rallins of the United States despite the two sharing the same time. She won her first national title in the 100 m hurdles at the 1977 Japan Championships in Athletics. Her time of 14.09 seconds was the fastest automatically-timed win at the competition at that point. Her first medal for Japan at a major tournament followed at the 1977 Pacific Conference Games held in Canberra. She finished third behind America's Deby LaPlante and Cheryl Boswell of Australia.

=== First Asian titles ===
After losing the national title to Tamie Motegi in 1978, her breakthrough year came in the 1979 track and field season. She set a championship record of 13.81 seconds to regain her Japanese crown. She was her country's leading hurdles entrant at the 1979 Asian Athletics Championships, held on home turf in Tokyo, and won the gold medal with a championship record of 14.17 seconds, comfortably ahead of China's Dai Jianhua and her compatriot Motegi. A global debut followed at the 1979 IAAF World Cup in Montreal, where she placed eighth as Asia's representative.

Akimoto defended her national title in 1980, then again in 1981, improving further to 13.71 seconds. She won another bronze medal at the Pacific Conference Games that year – one of only three Japanese women ton win an individual medal there, alongside high jumper Hisayo Fukumitsu and fellow hurdler Yumiko Aoi. She remained unchallenged at continental level, repeating her hurdles victory at the 1981 Asian Athletics Championships (again held in Tokyo) in a new championship record of 13.78 seconds ahead of China's Dia. Another appearance for Asia came as a result at the 1981 IAAF World Cup, where she again placed eighth.

=== Asian Games and third Asian title ===
Her career peak came at the 1982 Asian Games. Dia of China entered as defending champion but two Japanese women finished ahead of her: Akimoto claimed the gold in a lifetime best of 13.63 seconds, trailed by Chizuko Akimoto. She then teamed up with Emiko Konishi, Hiromi Isozaki and Junko Yoshida to form the Japanese women's 4×100 metres relay quartet. The team comprised some of the best sprinters of the region: Konishi was the reigning 200 m Asian champion, Isozaki had won a double sprint at the Asian Games, while Yoshida was the reigning 400 m Asian champion. The team won the gold medal in an Asian record of 45.13 seconds.

Akimoto's win-streak at national level extended to 1983, meaning she had gone unbeaten in five finals at the event. In her last year of international competition she competed under her married name: Emi Sasaki (Japanese: 佐々木恵美). She had a third consecutive win at the 1983 Asian Athletics Championships, equalling her time from the Asian Games to set a championship record, despite a strong −2.0 m/s wind. This was almost two tenths of a second faster than runner-up Liu Huajin of China, who would go on to win the title herself two years later. Akimoto was one of three Asian entrants in the women's 100 m hurdles at the inaugural 1983 World Championships in Athletics, alongside her traditional rival Dia and Lin Yueh-Hsiang (the bronze medallist at the Asian Championships). With a run of 13.73 seconds in the quarter-finals, Akimoto was the best performer among them, but this left her in eighth and she was eliminated.

She made her final contribution to the Japanese record book with a time of 7.19 seconds for the indoor 50 metres hurdles in 1986. This mark remains unbeaten. Following her retirement, she has remained connected with athletics and worked with the Japan Association of Athletics Federations to promote the sport among children.

== National titles ==
- Japan Championships in Athletics
  - 100 m hurdles: 1977, 1979, 1980, 1981, 1982, 1983

== International competitions ==
Year	Competition	Venue	Position	Event	Notes
1977	Pacific Conference Games	Canberra, Australia	3rd	100 m hurdles	14.44
1979	Asian Championships	Tokyo, Japan	1st	100 m hurdles	14.17
1979	World Cup	Montreal, Canada	8th	100 m hurdles	14.28
1981	Pacific Conference Games	Christchurch, New Zealand	3rd	100 m hurdles	13.83
1981	Asian Championships	Tokyo, Japan	1st	100 m hurdles	13.78
1981	World Cup	Rome, Italy	8th	100 m hurdles	13.97
1982	Asian Games	New Delhi, India	1st	100 m hurdles	13.63
1982	Asian Games	New Delhi, India	1st	4 × 100 m relay	45.13
1983	Asian Championships	Kuwait City, Kuwait	1st	100 m hurdles	13.63
1983	World Championships	Helsinki, Finland	8th (q-finals)	100 m hurdles	13.73
