= Angel Mary Joseph =

Indian athletics competitor

Personal information
- Full name: Angel Mary Joseph
- Nationality: Indian
- Born: 24 September 1953 (age 72) Davangere, Mysore State (Now in Karnataka), India

Sport
- Country: India
- Sport: Track and field
- Event(s): 100 metres hurdles, Long Jump, Pentathlon
Medal record
Representing India
Women's athletics
Asian Games
Silver medal – second place	1978 Bangkok	Long Jump
Silver medal – second place	1978 Bangkok	Pentathlon
Asian Championships
Bronze medal – third place	1979 Tokyo	4×100 m relay

Angel Mary Joseph (born 24 September 1953) is a retired Indian track and field athlete. She specialized in 100 metres hurdles, Long Jump, Pentathlon, and once held national records in all the three and high jump and heptathlon. At the 1978 Asian Games in Bangkok, she won silver medals in long jump and pentathlon. She also represented Karnataka and Railways playing basketball in the National Championships.

Recognizing her achievements in track and field, Mary was awarded the Arjuna Award by the government of India in 1979.
