= Shen Maomao =

Chinese javelin thrower (born 1957)

Personal information
- Born: 27 March 1957 (age 69)

Sport
- Sport: Track and field
Medal record
Representing China
Asian Games
Gold medal – first place	1978 Bangkok	Javelin throw
Asian Championships
Gold medal – first place	1979 Tokyo	Javelin throw
Gold medal – first place	1981 Tokyo	Javelin throw

Shen Maomao (Chinese: 申毛毛; born 27 March 1957) is a Chinese former track and field athlete who competed in the javelin throw. His is a three-time Asian champion and a former Asian record holder.

== Career ==
He rose to prominence with a gold medal-winning performance at the 1978 Asian Games, breaking the games record for the javelin with his throw of 79.24 m (259 ft 11 1/2 in) to beat Japan's best athlete, Toshihiko Takeda. This made him the first Chinese man to win that title, building on the success of his female counterpart Mao Jiajou in 1974. The following year he defeated Toshihiro Yamada in Tokyo by over eight metres to take the gold medal at the 1979 Asian Athletics Championships. Again this was a championship record and a first win for a Chinese athlete, and was also a new Asian record. Reflecting growing national prowess in the discipline, Li Xia also won the women's event that year.

China's 1980 Olympic boycott meant that Maomao did not get the opportunity to compete at the highest international stage. He did compete at the alternative Liberty Bell Classic event held in the United States and was a clear winner with a throw of 89.12 m (292 ft 4 1/2 in). This throw would have been sufficient to earn him an Olympic medal at the 1980 Moscow Games. The mark was far in excess of his previous best and represented another Asian record for the Chinese thrower. A former Chinese national record, it remains the best mark ever set by a Chinese with the old javelin design. Among Asian athletes, only Kazakhstan's Viktor Yevsyukov (then competing for the Soviet Union) threw further.

Shen's last major competition was the 1981 Asian Athletics Championships and he successfully defended his title against Japanese opposition in Tokyo. This made him the first athlete to win that title twice. That year shot putter Mohammed Al-Zinkawi and Shigenobu Murofushi were also repeat throws champions.

His career best of 89.12 m in Philadelphia is also reported as being 89.14 m (perhaps due to the difference in converting imperial measurements). His highest global ranking came with this mark, at twelfth for the 1980 season. His throw of 80.48 m (264 ft 1/2 in) to win at the 1979 National Games of China was the record for the old javelin throw implement.

== International competitions ==
Year	Competition	Venue	Position	Notes
1978	Asian Games	Bangkok, Thailand	1st	79.24 m GR
1979	Asian Championships	Tokyo, Japan	1st	86.50 m CR
1980	Liberty Bell Classic	Philadelphia, United States	1st	89.12 m AR
1981	Asian Championships	Tokyo, Japan	1st	85.40 m

== National titles ==
- Chinese National Games
  - Javelin throw: 1979
