= Rita Sen =

Indian sprinter

Personal information
- Nationality: Indian

Sport
- Country: India
- Sport: Athletics
Medal record
Women's athletics
Representing India
Asian Games
Silver medal – second place	1982 New Delhi	4×400 m
Asian Championships
Silver medal – second place	1979 Tokyo	400 m
Bronze medal – third place	1979 Tokyo	4×100 m
Bronze medal – third place	1981 Tokyo	4×400 m

Rita Sen is an Indian athlete. She won a Silver medal in 4 × 400 m relay in the 1982 Asian Games.
