= Takao Sakamoto =

Japanese high jumper (born 1958)

Personal information
- Born: 19 December 1958 (age 67) Gunma Prefecture, Japan
- Height: 183 cm (6 ft 0 in)
- Weight: 72 kg (159 lb)

Sport
- Sport: Athletics
- Event: high jump
Medal record
Men's athletics
Representing Japan
Asian Games
Gold medal – first place	1978 Bangkok	High jump
Bronze medal – third place	1982 New Delhi	High jump
Asian Championships
Silver medal – second place	1979 Tokyo	High jump
Silver medal – second place	1981 Tokyo	High jump
Silver medal – second place	1985 Jakarta	High jump

Takao Sakamoto (阪本 孝男, Sakamoto Takao; born 19 December 1958) is a Japanese former high jumper who competed in the 1984 Summer Olympics.

Sakamoto won the British AAA Championships title twice, at the 1979 AAA Championships and the 1982 AAA Championships.
