= Somsak Boontud =

Thai sprinter (born 1952)

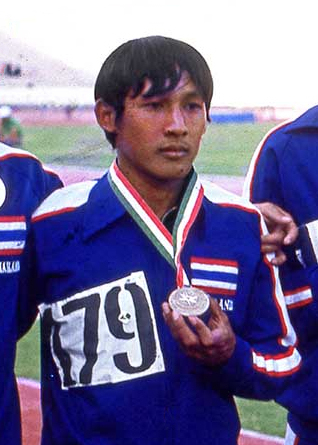
- Boontud at the 1974 Asian Games

Personal information
- Born: 24 November 1952 (age 73)
- Height: 163 cm (5 ft 4 in)
- Weight: 58 kg (128 lb)

Sport
- Sport: Athletics
- Event: 100 m

Achievements and titles
- Personal best: 10.4 (1979)
Medal record
Men's athletics
Representing Thailand
Asian Games
| Gold medal – first place | 1974 Tehran | 4×100 m |
| Gold medal – first place | 1978 Bangkok | 4×100 m |
| Silver medal – second place | 1982 New Delhi | 4×100 m |
Asian Championships
| Silver medal – second place | 1973 Marikina | 4×100 m |
| Silver medal – second place | 1979 Tokyo | 4×100 m |
| Silver medal – second place | 1981 Tokyo | 4×100 m |
| Silver medal – second place | 1983 Kuwait City | 4×100 m |

Somsakdi Boontud (Thai: สมศักดิ์ บุญทัต, RTGS: Somsak Bunthat; born 24 November 1952) is a retired Thai sprinter who specialized in the 4 × 100 m relay. In this event he won gold medals at the Asian Games in 1974 and 1978, and four silver medals at the Asian Games and Championships between 1979 and 1983. He competed at the 1972 and 1976 Summer Olympics, but failed to reach the finals. Individually he qualified for the 1975 Asian Championships in the 200 m, but withdrew due to injury.
