= Chang Yong-ae =

North Korean middle-distance runner

Medal record

Women's athletics

Representing North Korea

Asian Championships
Silver medal – second place	1979 Tokyo	800 m

Chang Yong-ae (Korean: 장용애) is a North Korean former track and field runner who competed in the 800 metres and 1500 metres. She won a middle-distance double at the 1982 Asian Games, taking gold medals in both 800 m and 1500 m in Asian record times.

She was the first Korean to win the Asian 800 m title and succeeded her compatriot Kim Ok-sun to the 1500 m title in 1982. She set a 4 × 400 metres relay national record at the 1978 Asian Games, where she was an 800 m bronze medallist behind her compatriot Jung Dong-sun. She was also a silver medallist in the 800 m at the 1979 Asian Athletics Championships, finishing behind South Korea's Chung Byong-Soon.

== International competitions ==
Year	Competition	Venue	Position	Event	Notes
1978	Asian Games	Bangkok, Thailand	3rd	800 m	2:08.3
1979	Asian Championships	Tokyo, Japan	2nd	800 m	2:10.2
1982	Asian Games	New Delhi, India	1st	800 m	2:05.69
1982	Asian Games	New Delhi, India	1st	1500 m	4:19.40
