= 1979 Asian Athletics Championships =

1979 Asian Championships
- Dates: May 31-June 3
- Host city: Tokyo, Japan
- Venue: National Olympic Stadium
- Participation: at least 10 nations

The third Asian Athletics Championships were held in 1979 in Tokyo, Japan.

== Medal summary ==
=== Men ===
Event	Gold		Silver		Bronze	
100 metres (wind: -1.6 m/s)	Suchart Chairsuvaparb; Thailand	10.63	Suh Mei-Guh; South Korea	10.75	Akira Harada; Japan	10.80
200 metres (wind: -1.7 m/s)	Yasuhiro Harada; Japan	21.34	Shunzo Shito; Japan	21.34	Toshio Toyota; Japan	21.39
400 metres	Shoichi Handa; Japan	47.45	Abbas Al-Aibi; Iraq	47.47	Fahim Sada; Iraq	47.51
800 metres	Falah Naji Jarallah; Iraq	1:49.5a	Toshifumi Shigenari; Japan	1:49.6a	Sant Kumar; India	1:50.1a
1500 metres	Ratan Singh Bhadouria; India	3:49.8a	Takashi Ishii; Japan	3:50.1a	Toshifumi Shigenari; Japan	3:50.9a
5000 metres	Hideki Kita; Japan	13:55.3a	Takao Nakamura; Japan	13:59.8a	Gopal Singh Saini; India	13:59.8a
10,000 metres	Toshihiko Seko; Japan	28:59.2a	Kunimitsu Ito; Japan	29:00.2a	Takeshi So; Japan	29:02.5a
3000 metre steeplechase	Masanari Shintaku; Japan	8:40.8a	Hitoshi Iwabuchi; Japan	8:57.2a	Gopal Singh Saini; India	9:12.4a
110 metres hurdles (wind: +0.7 m/s)	Yoshifumi Fujimori; Japan	14.29	Satbir Singh; India	14.53	Jabbar Rahima; Iraq	14.72
400 metres hurdles	Hussein Kadhum; Iraq	51.18	Takashi Nagao; Japan	51.53	Yukihiro Yoshimatsu; Japan	52.14
4 × 100 metres relay	Japan; Yasuhiro Harada; Junichi Usui; Shunzo Shito; Akira Harada	39.70	Thailand; Somsak Boontud; Suchart Chairsuvaparb; Anat Ratanapol; Prasit Boonprasert	40.20	India; Adille Sumariwalla; Ramaswamy Gnanasekaran; O.L. Thomas; Thamizharasan	40.41
4 × 400 metres relay	Iraq; Hussein Ali Nasayyif; Heitham Nadim; Fahim Abdul-Sada; Abbas Al-Aibi	3:08.8a	Japan; Eiji Natori; Yasuhiro Harada; Takayuki Isobe; Takashi Nagao	3:08.9a	India; P.V. Kamaraj; Piara Singh; Harkamaljit Singh; Uday Krishna Prabhu	3:11.8a
20 kilometre road walk	Hakam Singh; India	1:35:40	Wang Qiang; People's Republic of China	1:35:48	Vellasamy Subramaniam; Malaysia	1:36:27
High jump	Kazunori Koshikawa; Japan	2.15	Takao Sakamoto; Japan	2.15	Takashi Katamine; Japan	2.15
Pole vault	Itsuo Takanezawa; Japan	5.20	Tomomi Takahashi; Japan	5.10	Yosuhiro Kigawa; Japan	5.00
Long jump	Junichi Usui; Japan	7.97	Suresh Babu; India	7.94	Toshihisa Yoshimoto; Japan	7.91w
Triple jump	Zhou Zhenxian; People's Republic of China	17.02	Motokuni Hiratani; Japan	16.52w	Masami Nakanishi; Japan	16.50w
Shot put	Mohammed Al-Zinkawi; Kuwait	17.78	Zhao Baoqin; People's Republic of China	17.50	Bahadur Singh Chouhan; India	17.47
Discus throw	Kiyotaka Kawasaki; Japan	55.34	Li Weinan; People's Republic of China	54.64	Michio Kita; Japan	53.06
Hammer throw	Shigenobu Murofushi; Japan	66.73	Masayuki Kawata; Japan	65.94	Raghubir Singh Bal; India	61.52
Javelin throw	Shen Maomao; People's Republic of China	86.50	Toshihiro Yamada; Japan	78.46	Masahiko Takita; Japan	78.46
Decathlon	Atsushi Kasai; Japan	7096	Toshikazu Kobayashi; Japan	6983	Jin Xuewei; People's Republic of China	6975

=== Women ===
Event	Gold		Silver		Bronze	
100 metres (wind: -1.8 m/s)	Emiko Konishi; Japan	12.09	Ying Yaping; People's Republic of China	12.10	Mo Myung-Hee; South Korea	12.11
200 metres (wind: 0.0 m/s)	Sumiko Kaibara; Japan	24.45	Mo Myung-Hee; South Korea	24.49	Emiko Konishi; Japan	24.72
400 metres	Chung Byong-Soon; South Korea	54.33	Rita Sen; India	54.99	Yumiko Aoi; Japan	55.66
800 metres	Chung Byong-Soon; South Korea	2:06.1a	Chang Yong-Ae; North Korea	2:10.2a	Takako Sanda; Japan	2:11.8a
1500 metres	Kim Ok-Sun; North Korea	4:25.0a	Kim Chun-Hwa; North Korea	4:29.1a	Lü Hongxiang; People's Republic of China	4:31.3a
3000 metres	Kim Ok-Sun; North Korea	9:24.9a	Yang Yenying; People's Republic of China	9:30.8a	Kim Chun-Hwa; North Korea	9:31.4a
100 metres hurdles (wind: +1.2 m/s)	Emi Akimoto; Japan	14.17	Dai Jianhua; People's Republic of China	14.33	Tamie Motegi; Japan	14.45
400 metres hurdles	Yumiko Aoi; Japan	60.46	Marina Chin Leng Sim; Malaysia	61.63	Zhan Xin; People's Republic of China	61.84
4 × 100 metre relay	Japan; Yukiko Osako; Sumiko Kaihara; Emiko Konishi; Emi Akimoto-Sasaki	45.85	Thailand; Buspranee Ratanapol; Usanee Laopinkarn; Pusadee Sangvijit; Walapa Pinij	46.03	India; Veena Chandola; Rita Sen; Angel Mary Joseph; Srirupa Chatterjee	46.93
4 × 400 metre relay	Japan; Yoshie Iizuka; Masae Kiguchi; Hiromi Hatano; Yumiko Aoi	3:45.9a	Malaysia; Marina Chin; Zaiton Othman; Vengadasalam Angamah; Saik Oik Cum	3:46.3a	Philippines; Mirna Ayo; Carmen Torres; Lorena Morcilla; Lydia De Vega	3:57.5a
High jump	Zheng Dazhen; People's Republic of China	1.87	Tamami Yagi; Japan	1.81	Hisayo Fukumitsu; Japan	1.81
Long jump	Sumie Awara; Japan	6.42w	Zou Wa; People's Republic of China	6.27w	Kazuko Ishizu; Japan	6.05w
Shot put	Shen Lijuan; People's Republic of China	17.48	Yukari Seo; Japan	14.78	Yumiko Asari; Japan	14.12
Discus throw	Li Xiaohui; People's Republic of China	58.62	Yukari Seo; Japan	46.64	Yumiko Asari; Japan	44.16
Javelin throw	Li Xia; People's Republic of China	58.44	Yao Juiying; People's Republic of China	54.82	Naomi Shibusawa; Japan	51.16
Pentathlon	Ye Peisu; People's Republic of China	4139	Tomoko Uchida; Japan	3753	Sachie Sekiguchi; Japan	3706

== Medal table ==
* Host nation (Japan)

Rank	Nation	Gold	Silver	Bronze	Total
1	Japan (JPN)*	20	18	21	59
2	People's Republic of China	7	8	3	18
3	Iraq (IRQ)	3	1	2	6
4	India (IND)	2	3	8	13
5	North Korea (PRK)	2	2	1	5
5	South Korea (KOR)	2	2	1	5
7	Thailand (THA)	1	2	0	3
8	Kuwait (KUW)	1	0	0	1
9	Malaysia (MAS)	0	2	1	3
10	Philippines (PHI)	0	0	1	1
Totals (10 entries)		38	38	38	114
