= Marian Fisher =

Australian hurdler (born 1954)

Personal information
- Full name: Marian O'Shaughnessy
- Born: Marian Fisher; November 6, 1954 (age 71)
Medal record
Women's athletics
Representing Australia
Pacific Conference Games
Gold medal – first place	1977 Pacific Conference Games	400 m hurdles
Gold medal – first place	1977 Pacific Conference Games	4x100m relay
Gold medal – first place	1977 Pacific Conference Games	4x400m relay
Gold medal – first place	1981 Pacific Conference Games	4x400m relay

Marian O'Shaughnessy (née Fisher ; born November 6, 1954) is an Australian retired female track and field athlete. She competed in the 400 meters and 400 meters hurdles events. She won four gold medals at the Pacific Conference Games during her career.

Fisher was the first Australian woman's champion at the 400m hurdles in 1976 and the first to win a medal in an international competition with her gold at the 1977 Pacific Conference Games. At that competition she also won gold in the 4 × 100 m and the 4 × 400 m relays plus a bronze in the 400m.

Under her married name of O'Shaughnessy, Fisher won a further gold in the 4 × 400 m relay and a bronze in the 400m at the 1981 Pacific Conference Games.

Fisher also represented Oceania in the 4 × 400 m relay at the Athletics World Cup in 1977, 1979 and 1981.

In Australia, Fisher was three times champion in the 400m hurdles 1977-79 and 400m champion in 1977.

== Awards and accolades ==
In 2021, Fisher as Marian O'Shaughnessy was elected as a Life Member of Athletics Australia.
