= 1983 Asian Athletics Championships =

1983 Asian Championships
- Dates: November 3–9
- Host city: Kuwait City, Kuwait
- Venue: Kuwait National Stadium
- Participation: at least 16 nations

The fifth Asian Championships in Athletics were held in November 1983 in Kuwait City, Kuwait.

== Medal summary ==
=== Men ===
Event	Gold		Silver		Bronze	
100 metres (wind: 0.0 m/s)	Suchart Chairsuvaparb; Thailand	10.47	Sumet Promna; Thailand	10.52	Mohamed Purnomo; Indonesia	10.60
200 metres (wind: -4.2 m/s)	Sumet Promna; Thailand	21.39	Mohamed Purnomo; Indonesia	21.64	Jang Jae-keun; South Korea	21.70
400 metres	Isidro del Prado; Philippines	46.24	Aouf Abdulrahman Yousef; Iraq	46.74	Mohamed Nordin Jadi; Malaysia	46.76
800 metres	Najem Abdullah Mutlaq; Kuwait	1:49.43	Khalid Khalifa; Kuwait	1:49.97	Wang Lung-hua; Chinese Taipei	1:49.98
1500 metres	Suresh Yadav; India	3:44.74	Susumu Yoshida; Japan	3:45.67	Najem Abdullah Mutlaq; Kuwait	3:45.77
5000 metres	Zhang Guowei; China	14:07.72	Raj Kumar; India	14:22.56	Park Kyung-Duk; South Korea	14:25.85
10,000 metres	Zhang Guowei; China	29:45.41	Park Kyung-Duk; South Korea	30:04.89	Mohammad Vojdanzadeh; Iran	30:20.88
3000 metre steeplechase	Hwang Wen-cheng; Chinese Taipei	8:54.85	Hector Begeo; Philippines	8:55.57	Anokh Singh; India	9:05.80
110 metres hurdles (wind: -1.0 m/s)	Wu Chin-jing; Chinese Taipei	13.90	Yu Zhicheng; China	14.16	Ahmed Hamada Jassim; Bahrain	14.24 (NR)
400 metres hurdles	Ahmed Hamada Jassim; Bahrain	49.43	Shigenori Ohmori; Japan	50.69	Lin Cheng-jih; Chinese Taipei	51.09
4 × 100 metres relay	China; Cai Jianming; He Baodong; Yu Zhuanghui; Yuan Guoqiang	40.16	Thailand; Prasit Boonprasert; Somsak Boontud; Suchart Chairsuvaparb; Sumet Promna	40.25	South Korea; Kim Yong-il; Sung Nak-kun; Choi Yong-joon; Park Sung-jun	40.60
4 × 400 metres relay	Iraq; Fahim Abdul-Sada; Aouf Abdulrahman Yousef; Abbas Ali Lafta; Heitham Nadim	3:07.98	India; Ghulam Kibria; Charanjit Singh Bajwa; Pavittar Singh; Rajinder Sharma	3:11.02	Philippines; Isidro Del Prado; Honesto Larce; Leopoldo Arnillo; Renato Unso	3:11.09
20 kilometre road walk	Chand Ram; India	1:30:14	Zhang Fuzin; China	1:32:14	Buta Singh; India	1:43:19
High jump	Zhu Jianhua; China	2.31	Qassim Mohammed; Iraq	2.10	Chin Yi-Shik; South Korea	2.05
Pole vault	Zhang Chen; China	5.00	Ku Chin-shui; Chinese Taipei	4.80	Sunder Singh Tanwar; India	4.50
Long jump	Liu Yuhuang; China	7.97	Lee Bou-chai; Chinese Taipei	7.70	Koji Umemoto; Japan	7.60
Triple jump	Mai Guoqiang; China	16.25	Yasushi Ueta; Japan	16.10	Park Yeong-jun; South Korea	15.80
Shot put	Mohammed Al-Zinkawi; Kuwait	17.90	Balwinder Singh; India	16.89	Iqbal Singh; India	16.72
Discus throw	Li Weinan; China	55.40	Ajmer Singh; India	52.30	Nejim Abdulrazak; Kuwait	51.00
Hammer throw	Xie Yingqi; China	65.78	Masayuki Kawata; Japan	65.60	Raghubir Singh Bal; India	60.52
Javelin throw	Masami Yoshida; Japan	79.50	Kazuhiro Mizoguchi; Japan	70.16	Chen Hung-yen; Chinese Taipei	68.20
Decathlon	Lee Fu-an; Chinese Taipei	7641	Ku Chin-shui; Chinese Taipei	7438	Takeshi Kojo; Japan	7277

=== Women ===
Event	Gold		Silver		Bronze	
100 metres (wind: -2.0 m/s)	Lydia de Vega; Philippines	11.82	Valapa Pinij; Thailand	12.01	Shen Su-Feng; Chinese Taipei	12.07
200 metres (wind: -2.9 m/s)	Lydia de Vega; Philippines	24.07	P.T. Usha; India	24.68	Mo Myung-Hee; South Korea	24.72
400 metres	P.T. Usha; India	54.20	Junko Yoshida; Japan	54.65	Lydia de Vega; Philippines	55.66
800 metres	Huo Lianzhu; China	2:08.92	Im Chun-Sil; North Korea	2:09.20	Geng Xiuquan; China	2:10.02
1500 metres	Geng Xiuquan; China	4:30.72	Gao Suju; China	4:31.10	Kim Lyong-Soon; North Korea	4:31.13
3000 metres	Kim Lyong-Soon; North Korea	9:39.64	Kim Chun-Hwa; North Korea	9:41.34	Kim Soon-Hwa; South Korea	9:47.19
100 metres hurdles (wind: -2.0 m/s)	Emi Sasaki (Akimoto); Japan	13.63	Liu Huajin; China	13.82	Lin Yueh-Hsiang; Chinese Taipei	14.04
400 metres hurdles	Yoko Sato; Japan	59.89	Chizuko Akimoto; Japan	59.95	Agrifina de la Cruz; Philippines	61.26
4 × 100 metres relay	Thailand; Jaree Patarach; Sarinee Phenglaor; Walapa Pinij; Wanna Popirom	46.12	Chinese Taipei; Shen Su-feng; Lin Ruei-er; Jen Yui-chu; Lin Li-shui	46.42	Japan; Arisa Aman; Chizuko Akimoto; Junko Yoshida; Emi Akimoto-Sasaki	46.47
4 × 400 metres relay	Thailand; Ratjai Sripet; Walapa Tangjitnusorn; Usa Chanaphani; Reim Sriteingtrong	3:48.62	Chinese Taipei; Shen Su-feng; Lin Ruei-er; Jen Yui-chu; Lin Li-shui	3:58.52	Jordan; Khadija Al-Matari; Wannas Abu Kartoumah; Faten Al-Omari; Amneh Odeh Mershed	4:17.41
High jump	Zheng Dazhen; China	1.84	Ge Ping; China	1.84	Kim Hee-sun; South Korea	1.81
Long jump	Liao Wenfen; China	6.21	Elma Muros; Philippines	6.09	Huang Donghuo; China	6.08
Shot put	Lu Cheng; China	17.38	So Bok-Hui; North Korea	14.61	Woo Kyon-Sun; South Korea	14.12
Discus throw	Jiao Yunxiang; China	53.00	Chun Hwa-Kyung; South Korea	47.20	Jeanette Ayoub; Lebanon	37.06
Javelin throw	Xin Xiaoli; China	53.48	Lee Huei-Cheng; Chinese Taipei	42.48	–	–
Heptathlon	Hisako Hashimoto; Japan	5486	Ye Lianying; China	5394	Chen Jin-Yun; Chinese Taipei	5075

== Medal table ==
* Host nation (Kuwait)

Rank	Nation	Gold	Silver	Bronze	Total
1	China (CHN)	16	6	2	24
2	Japan (JPN)	4	7	3	14
3	Thailand (THA)	4	3	0	7
4	Chinese Taipei (TPE)	3	6	6	15
5	India (IND)	3	5	5	13
6	Philippines (PHI)	3	2	3	8
7	Kuwait (KUW)*	2	1	2	5
8	North Korea (PRK)	1	3	1	5
9	Iraq (IRQ)	1	2	0	3
10	Bahrain (BHR)	1	0	1	2
11	South Korea (KOR)	0	2	9	11
12	Indonesia (INA)	0	1	1	2
13	Iran (IRN)	0	0	1	1
13	Jordan (JOR)	0	0	1	1
13	Lebanon (LIB)	0	0	1	1
13	Malaysia (MAS)	0	0	1	1
Totals (16 entries)		38	38	37	113

== See also ==
- 1983 in athletics (track and field)
