= Yoshifumi Fujimori =

Japanese hurdler (born 1958)

Medal record

Men's athletics

Representing Japan

Asian Games
| Gold medal – first place | 1982 New Delhi | 110 m hurdles |
| Silver medal – second place | 1978 Bangkok | 110 m hurdles |

Asian Championships
| Gold medal – first place | 1979 Tokyo | 110 m hurdles |
| Gold medal – first place | 1981 Tokyo | 110 m hurdles |

Yoshifumi Fujimori (Japanese: 藤森良文; born 9 March 1958) is a Japanese former track and field athlete who competed in the 110 metres hurdles. He was the gold medallist at the 1982 Asian Games and twice winner at the Asian Athletics Championships. He competed twice for Asia at the IAAF World Cup.

A four-time national champion at the Japan Championships in Athletics, his personal best for 110 m hurdles was 14.06 seconds (a former Asian record).

== Career ==
Fujimori emerged at national level in 1978 with a win at the Japan Championships in Athletics, taking the 110 m hurdles title in a time of 14.29 seconds (the fastest non-hand-timed mark at the championships at that point). He ran a lifetime best of 14.06 seconds in May that same year – this was an Asian record for the discipline. Later that year he was chosen as Japan's representative in the Asian Games in Bangkok. There he finished with a slightly slower time of 14.33 seconds, but this was enough for the silver medal behind Wang Xunhua of China.

He was beaten at the national championships the following year by Katsumi Kashiwazaki but continued to establish himself internationally with a win at the 1979 Asian Athletics Championships in Tokyo, becoming the second Japanese to win the title after Shigeo Oki. This gained him his first selection to represent Asia at the 1979 IAAF World Cup, but at that competition in Montreal he failed to finish the race.

The second national title of his career came in 1980, but again he failed to defend it the year after, with Noriyuki Takahashi taking the honours in 1981. It was Fujimori and Kashiwazaki who were picked to run the sprint hurdles for Japan at the 1981 Asian Athletics Championships, which was held on home turf in Tokyo for second time running. The pair took the top two spots and it was Fujimori who took the gold medal, doing so with a championship record time of 14.22 seconds. He returned as Asia's hurdler at the 1981 IAAF World Cup: his standard was somewhat below the global one and, although he not far off his season's best in eighth place, he was almost a second slower than the winner, Greg Foster of the United States.

Another championship record followed the year after, this time at the Japan Championships with a run of 14.13 seconds. The time stood for seven years, at which point Toshihiko Iwasaki bettered the record. Fujimori's career peak was at the 1982 Asian Games held in New Delhi. He was the fastest qualifier in the heats then reached an Asian Games record finishing time of 14.09 seconds. He was the clear winner as the runner-up Zhang Shensheng of China was nearly half a second behind him.

The Asian Games title was the last major international medal of Fujimori's career, though he did manage to win a fourth career title in the hurdles at the Japan Championships in 1983. As of 2015, he remains one of only two Japanese men to win the sprint hurdles at the Asian Games, alongside 1970's winner Chikashi Watanabe.

== National titles ==
- Japan Championships in Athletics
  - 110 m hurdles: 1978, 1980, 1982, 1983

== International competitions ==
| Year | Competition | Venue | Position | Event | Notes |
|---|---|---|---|---|---|
| 1978 | Asian Games | Bangkok, Thailand | 2nd | 110 m hurdles | 14.33 |
| 1979 | Asian Championships | Tokyo, Japan | 1st | 110 m hurdles | 14.29 |
| 1979 | World Cup | Montreal, Canada | — | 110 m hurdles | DNF |
| 1981 | Asian Championships | Tokyo, Japan | 1st | 110 m hurdles | 14.22 |
| 1981 | World Cup | Rome, Italy | 8th | 110 m hurdles | 14.31 |
| 1982 | Asian Games | New Delhi, India | 1st | 110 m hurdles | 14.09 |
