= Mercy Kuttan =

Indian athlete (born 1960)

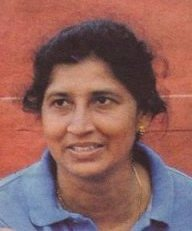
- Mercy Kuttan

Personal information
- Full name: Mercy Matthews-Kuttan
- Nationality: Indian
- Born: 1 January 1960 (age 66) Kerala, India

Sport
- Country: India
- Sport: Track and field
- Events: 400 metres, Long jump
Medal record
Women's Athletics
Representing India
Asian Games
Silver medal – second place	1982 New Delhi	Long jump
Asian Athletics Championships
Gold medal – first place	1989 New Delhi	4×400 m
Bronze medal – third place	1981 Tokyo	Long jump
Bronze medal – third place	1981 Tokyo	4×400 m

Mercy Kuttan (born 1 January 1960) is a former Indian track and field athlete. She was the first Indian woman long jumper to cross six meters. In 1989, Mercy received Arjuna Award for her contribution to the Indian athletics.

== Career ==
Mercy was born in Kerala; her first international success came in 1981 Asian Championships in Athletics when she won the double bronze in the long jump and 4 x 400 metres relay. In the next year at 1982 Asian Games when she won a silver medal in the long jump. She represented India in long jump at 1983 World Championships in Athletics, but did not qualify for the final round. Mercy has the distinction of being the first woman from Kerala to win a medal in the Asian Track and Field meet. Her personal best in long jump is 6.29 m. In the latter stage of her career she switched to sprint and started competing in 400 metres. She competed in 400 metres at 1988 Seoul Olympics and managed to reach the second round.

== Personal life ==
Mercy is married to Murali Kuttan, a former 400 metres national champion and is the mother of two sons, Suraj Kuttan and Sujith Kuttan. Mercy and Murali were the first Indian athletic couple to be national champions and win Asian medals. Murlai took the role of the coach and had influenced Mercy to shift from long jump to 400 metres. Both Mercy and Murali worked for Tata Steel, Jamshedpur. They are currently running the "Mercy Kuttan Athletics Academy" in Kochi.

== Achievements ==
National Level

- 1976 – 78—National School games champion in long jump
- 1979 – 80—All India Inter-University champion in 100 m, 200 m, and long jump
- 1979 – 87—National Champion in long jump
- 1988—National Champion in 400 meters

International Level

- 1980—Won Gold medal in long jump, 4 x 400 m and 4 x 100 m relay in Pakistan National Games at Lahore
- 1981—Represented India in World Spartakyad in Moscow in 1981
- 1981—Won Bronze Medal in long jump and 4 x 400 m relay in Asian track and field meet in Tokyo
- 1982—Won Silver Medal in long jump in the 9th Asian Games in New Delhi
- 1982—Represented India in Commonwealth Games in Brisbane, Australia
- 1983—Represented India in long jump in the First World Athletic Meet at Helsinki
- 1983—Represented India in Asian track and field meet in Kuwait
- 1986—Represented India in long jump in the 10th Asian Games at Seoul
- 1987—Won Gold Medal in long jump in the SAF Games in Calcutta
- 1988—Represented India in 400 m and 4 x 400 m relay in Seoul Olympics
- 1989—Won Gold Medal in 4 × 400 m relay in the Asian track and field at New Delhi

Other distinctions

- Captain of the Indian Team at the First World Athletic Championship.
- First Woman from India to participate in World Athletic Championship.
- First Indian Woman to cross 6 meters in long jump in India.
- National Record holder in long jump for seven years from 1980 – 87.
- National School record holder for 19 years.
- National University record holder for 27 years.
- 1st Indian woman athlete to win medals at national and international level in both track and field events.
- First Couple (Murali Kuttan) from India to win Asian Games individual medals.
