= Sant Kumar =

Indian middle-distance runner

Personal information
- Nationality: Indian
- Born: 24 July 1959 (age 67) [ Jasaur kheri, Haryana [India]]
- Height: 173 cm (5 ft 8 in)
- Weight: 62 kg (137 lb)

Sport
- Country: India
- Sport: Middle-distance running
Medal record
Men's athletics
Representing India
Asian Championships
Bronze medal – third place	1979 Tokyo	800 m
Bronze medal – third place	1981 Tokyo	1500 m

Sant Kumar is an Indian Olympic middle-distance runner. He represented his country in the men's 1500 meters at the 1980 Summer Olympics. His time was a 3:55.60.

Colonel Sant Kumar represented India in 1,500m at the Moscow Olympics. He was a bronze medallist in 1500m at the Asian Games in Bangkok, Thailand. Early life Done his schooling from sainik school kunjpura after 12th he went to agricultural university in Hisar, Haryana. He was selected in Army under sports quota .
