= Sabir Ali (decathlete) =

Indian decathlete (1955–2023)

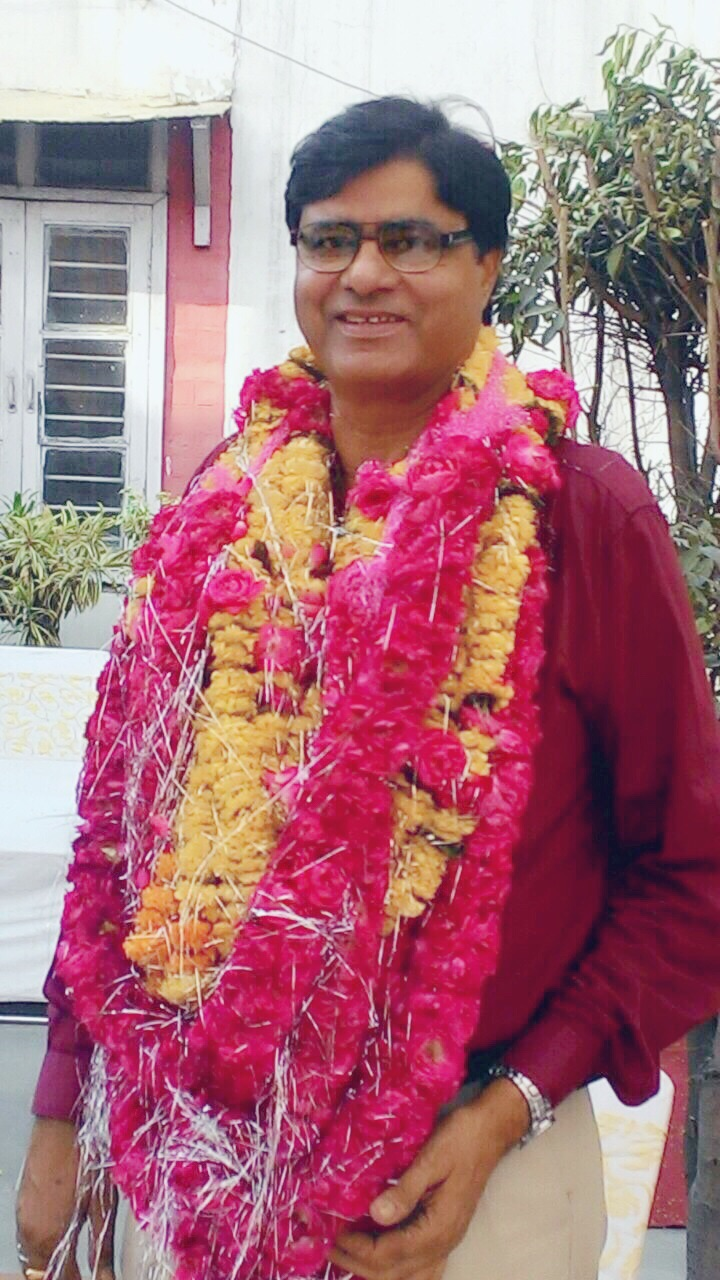

Personal information
- Born: Sabir Ali; 19 April 1955 Haryana, India
- Died: 22 January 2023 (aged 67) New Delhi
- Occupation: Track and field athlete
- Employers: Retired from Indian Railways, 2015
- Height: 6 ft 3 in (1.91 m)
- Spouse: Shabnam Ali
- Children: 2 (Shahzad Sabir Ali, Sophia Ali)
Medal record
Men's athletics
Representing India
Asian Championships
Gold medal – first place	1981 Tokyo	Decathlon

Sabir Ali (19 April 1955 – 22 January 2023) was an Indian decathlete. He was an Arjuna award winner (1981).

Born in Haryana, Ali won 10 gold medals in the decathlon, including at the 1981 Asian Athletics Championships held at Tokyo, Japan. He won two silver medals in South Asian Athletics meet held at Kathmandu & Dhaka.

He was declared the best sportsman of India in the year 1981 by Indian Railways and Journalist Association of India. He was conferred with Arjuna award by the president of India Zail Singh and Bhim award by the government of Haryana in 1981.

Winner of silver medal (1985) & bronze (1981) in world railway athletic championship held in East Germany and in Czechoslovakia. He became the Captain of Indian Athletics Team in Asian track and field athletic meet held in Kuwait in 1983. He was appointed as the chief coach of Indian railways and northern railways (1992–2002), member of selection committee (sr. athletics) of the country for five years.

He died of a cardiac arrest on 22 January 2023 at Northern Railway Central Hospital, New Delhi.
