= 1981 Asian Athletics Championships =

1981 Asian Championships
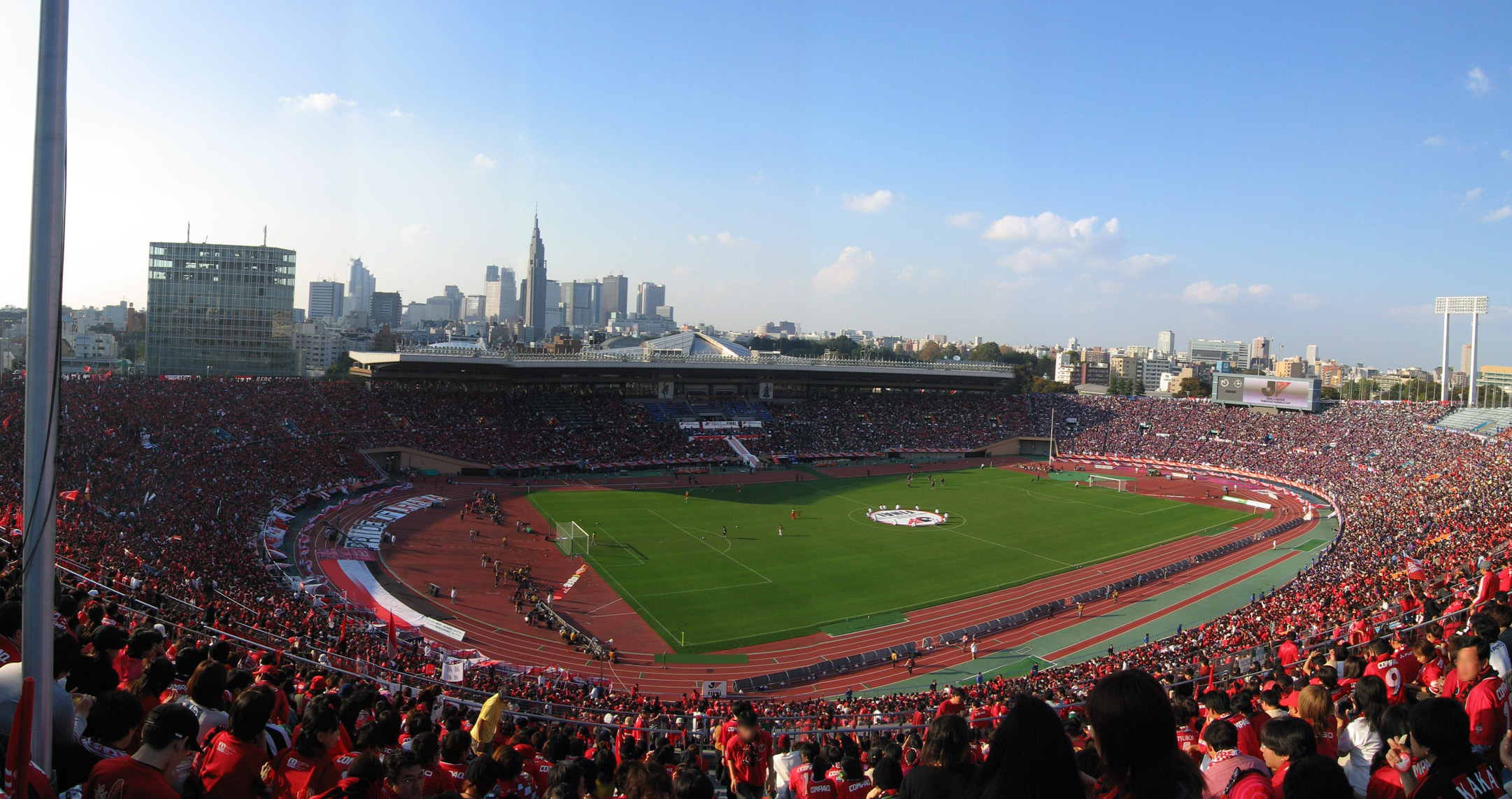
- The host stadium
- Dates: June 5-7
- Host city: Tokyo, Japan
- Venue: National Olympic Stadium
- Participation: at least 10 nations

The 1981 Asian Athletics Championships was the fourth edition of the biennial athletics competition for Asian nations, and was held from June 5-7, 1981 in Tokyo, Japan.

== Medal summary ==
=== Men ===
Event	Gold		Silver		Bronze	
100 metres (wind: -1.3 m/s)	Suchart Chairsuvaparb; Thailand	10.52	Yuan Guoqiang; China	10.69	Sumet Promna; Thailand	10.74
200 metres (wind: 0.0 m/s)	Toshio Toyota; Japan	20.99	Sumet Promna; Thailand	21.16	Hirohito Yamazaki; Japan	21.23
400 metres	Takayuki Isobe; Japan	46.72	Eiji Natori; Japan	46.92	Aouf Abdulrahman Yousef; Iraq	47.22
800 metres	Abraham Rajan; India	1:50.21	Khalid Khalifa; Kuwait	1:50.37	Takatsune Teranishi; Japan	1:50.62
1500 metres	Takashi Ishii; Japan	3:50.63	Sukhwant Singh; India	3:51.88	Sant Kumar; India	3:52.12
5000 metres	Gopal Singh Saini; India	13:52.22	Yasunori Watanabe; Japan	13:55.62	Park Won-Keun; South Korea	13:57.33
10,000 metres	Kunimitsu Ito; Japan	28:53.29	Tatsuya Moriguchi; Japan	29:24.77	Kazuyoshi Kudo; Japan	29:30.25
3000 metres steeplechase	Masanari Shintaku; Japan	8:29.09	Gopal Singh Saini; India	8:30.88	Anokh Singh; India	8:52.67
110 metres hurdles (wind: -0.1 m/s)	Yoshifumi Fujimori; Japan	14.22	Katsumi Kashiwazaki; Japan	14.33	Satbir Singh; India	14.89
400 metres hurdles	Takashi Nagao; Japan	50.32	Shigenori Ohmori; Japan	50.71	Yukihiro Yoshimatsu; Japan	51.35
4 × 100 metres relay	Japan; Hideyuki Arikawa; Toshio Toyota; Hirohito Yamazaki; Hideki Ikeda	39.86	Thailand; Somsak Boontud; Suchart Chairsuvaparb; Sumet Promna; Supachart Waranot	40.36	South Korea; Kim Yong-il; Sung Nak-kun; Choi Yong-joon; Suh Mei-guh	40.56
4 × 400 metres relay	Japan; Takayuki Isobe; Eiji Natori; Shigenori Ohmori; Takashi Nagao	3:07.06	Iraq; Abbas Al-Aibi; Fahim Abdul-Sada; Aouf Abdulrahman Yousef; Heitham Nadim	3:10.10	India; Murali Kuttan; Uday Krishna Prabhu; Charanjit Singh Bajwa; Sunil Abraham	3:10.54
20 kilometre road walk	Chand Ram; India	1:34:08	Ranjit Singh; India	1:35:20	Vellasamy Subramaniam; Malaysia	1:37:32
High jump	Zhu Jianhua; China	2.30	Takao Sakamoto; Japan	2.24	Shuji Ujino; Japan	2.21
Pole vault	Tomomi Takahashi; Japan	5.20	Rihan Ali Rihan Obeid; Saudi Arabia	4.40	Abdullah Awadh; Saudi Arabia	4.20
Long jump	Liu Yuhuang; China	8.05	Junichi Usui; Japan	7.94w	Toshihisa Yoshimoto; Japan	7.71
Triple jump	Zhou Zhenxian; China	17.05	Masami Nakanishi; Japan	16.61	Yasushi Ueta; Japan	16.10
Shot put	Mohammed Al-Zinkawi; Kuwait	17.87	Bahadur Singh Chouhan; India	17.38	Vijay Bahadur; India	16.71
Discus throw	Li Weinan; China	53.30	Michio Kita; Japan	51.76	Raghubir Singh Bal; India	50.04
Hammer throw	Shigenobu Murofushi; Japan	69.62	Masayuki Kawata; Japan	66.84	Nobuyuki Ifuku; Japan	65.98
Javelin throw	Shen Maomao; China	85.40	Yoshinori Kuriyama; Japan	78.56	Masami Yoshida; Japan	74.42
Decathlon	Sabir Ali; India	7253	Nobuya Saito; Japan	7078	Zu Qilin; China	7074

=== Women ===
Event	Gold		Silver		Bronze	
100 metres (wind: +0.4 m/s)	Yukiko Osako; Japan	11.91	Usanee Laopinkarn; Thailand	11.97	Emiko Konishi; Japan	12.02
200 metres (wind: -1.6 m/s)	Emiko Konishi; Japan	24.46	Tomi Osaka; Japan	24.52	Lydia de Vega; Philippines	24.54
400 metres	Junko Yoshida; Japan	54.89	Lydia de Vega; Philippines	55.39	Saik Oik Cum; Malaysia	55.62
800 metres	Geeta Zutshi; India	2:08.13	Kumiko Mega; Japan	2:09.86	Kim Soon-Hwa; South Korea	2:10.41
1500 metres	Zhang Xiunen; China	4:27.11	Geeta Zutshi; India	4:28.98	Kim Soon-Hwa; South Korea	4:30.81
3000 metres	Akemi Masuda; Japan	9:18.17	Nanae Sasaki; Japan	9:41.85	Jiang Zhourong; China	9:48.07
100 metres hurdles (wind: -0.9 m/s)	Emi Akimoto; Japan	13.78	Dai Jianhua; China	13.98	Noriko Ehara; Japan	14.09
400 metres hurdles	Yumiko Aoi; Japan	59.26	Hu Aiping; China	60.68	Manathoor D. Valsamma; India	61.16
4 × 100 metres relay	Japan; Tomi Osaka; Yukiko Osako; Emiko Konishi; Emi Akimoto-Sasaki	45.70	Thailand; Walapa Pinij; Usanee Laopinkarn; Pusadee Sangvijit; Buspranee Ratanapol	46.43	South Korea; Lee Young-sook; Mo Myung-hee; Park Mi-sun; Chun Jung-shik	47.85
4 × 400 metres relay	Malaysia; Vengadasalam Angamah; Mumtaz Begum Jafaar; Saik Oik Cum; Marina Chin	3:46.36	Philippines; Lydia De Vega; Gloria Acedo; Lorena Morcilla; Lucena Alam	3:55.60	India; Hamida Banu; Manathoor D. Valsamma; Mercy Matthews; Rita Sen	3:59.80
High jump	Hisayo Fukumitsu; Japan	1.93	Zheng Dazhen; China	1.84	Megumi Sato; Japan	1.81
Long jump	Wu Feng; China	5.97w	Atsuko Adada; Japan	5.93	Mercy Matthews; India	5.91
Shot put	Shen Lijuan; China	17.75	Kayoko Hayashi; Japan	15.66	Yukari Seo; Japan	15.18
Discus throw	Li Xiaohui; China	59.10	Harumi Suzuki; Japan	48.86	Reiko Honma; Japan	48.00
Javelin throw	Tang Guoli; China	61.64	Naomi Shibusawa; Japan	57.08	Kanae Takahashi; Japan	56.16
Heptathlon	Ye Peisu; China	5445	Tomoko Uchida; Japan	5254	Zaiton Othman; Malaysia	4879

== Medal table ==
* Host nation (Japan)

Rank	Nation	Gold	Silver	Bronze	Total
1	Japan (JPN)*	18	19	14	51
2	China (CHN)	11	4	2	17
3	India (IND)	5	5	9	19
4	Thailand (THA)	1	4	1	6
5	Kuwait (KUW)	1	1	0	2
6	Malaysia (MAS)	1	0	3	4
7	Philippines (PHI)	0	2	1	3
8	Iraq (IRQ)	0	1	1	2
8	Saudi Arabia (KSA)	0	1	1	2
10	South Korea (KOR)	0	0	5	5
Totals (10 entries)		37	37	37	111
