= Chen Hung-yen =

Taiwanese javelin thrower

Personal information
- Full name: 陳鴻雁, Pinyin: Chén Hóng-yàn
- Nationality: Taiwanese
- Born: 1 October 1957 (age 68)

Sport
- Sport: Athletics
- Event: Javelin throw
Medal record
Men's athletics
Representing Chinese Taipei
Asian Championships
Bronze medal – third place	1983 Kuwait City	Javelin throw

Chen Hung-yen (born 1 October 1957) is a Taiwanese athlete.

== Career ==
He competed in the men's javelin throw at the 1984 Summer Olympics.
