= Hamida Banu =

Indian sprinter (1959 or 1960 – 2024)

Personal information
- Nationality: Indian
- Born: 1959 or 1960
- Died: 7 December 2024 (aged 60) Udaipur, India

Sport
- Country: India
- Sport: Athletics
Medal record
Women's athletics
Representing India
Asian Games
Silver medal – second place	1982 New Delhi	4×100 m
Asian Championships
Bronze medal – third place	1981 Tokyo	4×400 m

Hamida Banu (1959 or 1960 – 7 December 2024) was an Indian athlete. She won a silver medal in 4 × 400 m relay in the 1982 Asian Games.

Banu died at a hospital in Udaipur, on 7 December 2024, at the age of 64.
