= Zheng Dazhen =

Chinese high jumper (born 1959)

Personal information
- Born: September 22, 1959 (age 66) Xiamen, China

Sport
- Sport: Track and field
Medal record
Representing China
Asian Games
Gold medal – first place	1978 Bangkok	High jump
Gold medal – first place	1982 New Delhi	High jump
Silver medal – second place	1986 Seoul	High jump
Asian Championships
Gold medal – first place	1979 Tokyo	High jump
Gold medal – first place	1983 Kuwait City	High jump
Silver medal – second place	1981 Tokyo	High jump

Zheng Dazhen (simplified Chinese: 郑达真; traditional Chinese: 鄭達真; pinyin: Zhèng Dázhēn; born September 22, 1959) is a retired Chinese high jumper.

She finished eleventh at the 1984 Summer Olympics, and also won the 1984 Friendship Games. In 1983 she reached the final of the inaugural World Championships in Athletics, but finished 18th and last with only 1.80 metres.

On the regional level she won the Asian Championships in 1979 and 1983 as well as the 1978 and 1982 Asian Games, both times in new championship records (CR). In 1978 she jumped 1.88 m to improve the record with 10 centimetres; in 1982 she jumped 1.89 m. At the 1986 Asian Games Zheng got the silver medal despite equalling the CR, as the winner Megumi Sato, too equalling the CR, achieved the result with fewer failed attempts. In 1990 Sato set the current Asian Games record with 1.94 m.

Her personal best jump was 1.95 metres, achieved in May 1987 in Fukuoka.
