= Abraham Rajan =

Indian ex-athlete (born 1958)

Personal information
- Nationality: Indian

Sport
- Country: India
- Sport: Athletics
Medal record
Men's athletics
Representing India
Asian Championships
Gold medal – first place	1981 Tokyo	800 m

Abraham Rajan (born 1958) is an Indian ex-athlete who is currently a coach with Sports Authority of India (Sports Authority of India) and the Sports Development Authority of Tamil Nadu at the Jawaharlal Nehru Stadium facilities.

== Career and achievements ==
Abraham Rajan won the gold in the 800m at the 1981 Asian Athletics Championships with a time of 1:50.21. This was the crowning achievement of his athletics career which also included performances at the national and collegiate level. His 800m time is still a record for engineering colleges in Tamil Nadu.
