= Shen Lijuan =

Chinese shot putter (born 1958)

Personal information
- Born: 4 July 1958 (age 67)

Sport
- Sport: Track and field
Medal record
Representing China
Asian Games
Gold medal – first place	1978 Bangkok	Shot put
Silver medal – second place	1982 Delhi	Shot put
Asian Championships
Gold medal – first place	1979 Tokyo	Shot put
Gold medal – first place	1981 Tokyo	Shot put

Shen Lijuan (Chinese: 沈丽娟; born 4 July 1958) is a Chinese female former track and field athlete who competed in the shot put. She is a three-time Asian champion and a former Asian record holder for the event.

Shen was the first Chinese woman to have international success in the shot put. Her games record throw of 17.70 m (58 ft 3/4 in) to win the gold medal at the 1978 Asian Games made her the first Chinese to take the title and she achieved the same feat at the 1979 Asian Athletics Championships with a championship record of 17.48 m (57 ft 4 in) a year later. She was the first woman to throw beyond seventeen metres at either event.

She missed the 1980 Moscow Olympics due to China's 1980 Olympic boycott, but she competed at the alternative Liberty Bell Classic held in the United States and won that event with a throw of 17.09 m (56 ft 3/4 in). This standard was far short of the Eastern European woman who reached the podium at the Moscow Games. Shen remained at the top of her field at continental level, retaining her Asian gold medal at the 1981 Asian Athletics Championships and improving her championship record to 17.75 m (58 ft 2 3/4 in). He rise of national rival Li Meisu saw her fall back into the silver medal position at the 1982 Asian Games, however, as Li broke Shen's former record. In her last major appearance (and first global one) she was eliminated in qualifying at the 1983 World Championships in Athletics.

At national level, Shen won the shot put at the 1979 National Games of China with a meet record of 16.69 m (54 ft 9 in).

== International competitions ==
Year	Competition	Venue	Position	Notes
1978	Asian Games	Bangkok, Thailand	1st	17.70 m
1979	Asian Championships	Tokyo, Japan	1st	17.48 m
1980	Liberty Bell Classic	Philadelphia, United States	1st	17.09 m
1981	Asian Championships	Tokyo, Japan	1st	17.75 m
1982	Asian Games	New Delhi, India	2nd	17.25 m
1983	World Championships	Helsinki, Finland	7th (q)	16.99 m
