= Sumie Awara =

Japanese long jumper (born 1952)

Personal information
- Nationality: Japanese
- Born: 19 August 1952
- Died: 17 October 2007 (aged 55)

Sport
- Sport: Athletics
- Event: Long jump
Medal record
Women's athletics
Representing Japan
Asian Championships
Gold medal – first place	1979 Tokyo	Long jump

Sumie Awara (湶 純江, Awara Sumie; 19 August 1952 – 17 October 2007) was a Japanese track and field athlete. She competed in the women's long jump at the 1976 Summer Olympics.
