= Junichi Usui =

Japanese long jumper

Personal information
- Nationality: Japanese
- Born: 5 October 1957 (age 68) Miyagi, Japan
- Height: 178 cm (5 ft 10 in)
- Weight: 69 kg (152 lb)

Sport
- Sport: Athletics
- Event: long jump
Medal record
Men's athletics
Representing Japan
Asian Games
Gold medal – first place	1978 Bangkok	4x400m relay
Gold medal – first place	1982 New Delhi	4x400m relay
Silver medal – second place	1978 Bangkok	4x100m relay
Silver medal – second place	1978 Bangkok	Long jump
Silver medal – second place	1986 Seoul	Long jump
Bronze medal – third place	1982 New Delhi	4x100m relay
Bronze medal – third place	1982 New Delhi	Long jump
Asian Championships
Gold medal – first place	1979 Tokyo	4×100 m
Gold medal – first place	1979 Tokyo	Long jump
Silver medal – second place	1981 Tokyo	Long jump
Bronze medal – third place	1985 Jakarta	Long jump
Summer Universiade
Silver medal – second place	1979 Mexico City	Long jump

Junichi Usui (臼井 淳一, Usui Jun'ichi) (born 5 October 1957) is a retired Japanese long jumper, best known for finishing seventh at the 1984 Olympic Games.

Usui won the British AAA Championships title in the long jump event at the 1982 AAA Championships.

== International competitions ==
Representing Japan
Year	Competition	Venue	Position	Notes
1978	Asian Games	Bangkok, Thailand	2nd	
1979	Asian Championships	Tokyo, Japan	1st	7.97 m CR
1981	Asian Championships	Tokyo, Japan	2nd	
1982	Asian Games	New Delhi, India	3rd	
1984	Olympic Games	Los Angeles, United States	7th	
1985	Asian Championships	Jakarta, Indonesia	3rd	
1986	Asian Games	Seoul, South Korea	2nd	
1987	World Championships	Rome, Italy	12th	
1988	Olympic Games	Seoul, South Korea	—	NM
