= Mohammad Al-Zinkawi =

Kuwaiti shot putter

Personal information
- Nationality: Kuwaiti
- Born: 7 October 1953 (age 72)

Sport
- Sport: Athletics
- Event: Shot put
Medal record
Representing Kuwait
Asian Games
Silver medal – second place	1982 New Delhi	Shot put
Bronze medal – third place	1978 Bangkok	Shot put

Mohammad Gharib Al-Zinkawi (born 7 October 1953) is a Kuwaiti athlete. He competed in the men's shot put at the 1976, 1980 and the 1988 Summer Olympics.
