= Li Xiaohui (discus thrower) =

Chinese discus thrower (born 1956)

Medal record

Women's athletics

Representing China

Asian Championships
Gold medal – first place	1979 Tokyo	Discus throw
Gold medal – first place	1981 Tokyo	Discus throw
Gold medal – first place	1985 Jakarta	Discus throw

Li Xiaohui (born 12 February 1956) is a retired Chinese discus thrower.

== International competitions ==
Year	Competition	Venue	Position	Notes
1978	Asian Games	Bangkok, Thailand	1st	55.92 CR
1979	Asian Championships	Tokyo, Japan	1st	58.62 CR
1981	Asian Championships	Tokyo, Japan	1st	59.10 CR
1982	Asian Games	New Delhi, India	1st	57.24 CR
1983	World Championships	Helsinki, Finland	15th	54.58
1985	Asian Championships	Djakarta, Indonesia	1st	
1986	Asian Games	Seoul, South Korea	2nd	59.28 CR
