= Zou Zhenxian =

Chinese triple jumper (born 1955)

Personal information
- Born: November 10, 1955 (age 70) Liaoning, China

Sport
- Sport: Track and field
Medal record
Representing China
Asian Championships
Gold medal – first place	1979 Tokyo	Triple jump
Gold medal – first place	1981 Tokyo	Triple jump
Asian Games
Gold medal – first place	1982 New Delhi	Triple jump
Silver medal – second place	1978 Bangkok	Triple jump
Bronze medal – third place	1978 Bangkok	4x100m relay
Bronze medal – third place	1986 Seoul	Triple jump
Summer Universiade
Gold medal – first place	1981 Bucharest	Triple jump

Zou Zhenxian (simplified Chinese: 邹振先; traditional Chinese: 鄒振先; pinyin: Zōu Zhènxiān; born November 10, 1955) is a retired Chinese triple jumper, best known for finishing fourth at the 1984 Summer Olympics.

His personal best jump is 17.34 metres, achieved in September 1981 in Rome. This was the oldest Chinese record, until Li Yanxi broke it with a distance of 17.59 metres.

== International competitions ==
Year	Competition	Venue	Position	Event	Notes
Representing China
1978	Asian Games	Bangkok, Thailand	2nd	Triple jump	
1980	Olympic Boycott Games	Philadelphia, United States	1st	Triple jump	
1981	Universiade	Bucharest, Romania	1st	Triple jump	
1981	World Cup	Rome, Italy	2nd	Triple jump	
1982	Asian Games	New Delhi, India	1st	Triple jump	
1984	Olympic Games	Los Angeles, United States	4th	Triple jump	16.83 m
1986	Asian Games	Seoul, South Korea	3rd	Triple jump	
