= Murali Kuttan =

Indian sprinter

Personal information
- Full name: K. G. Murali Kuttan
- Nationality: India
- Born: 1953? Alappuzha, Kerala
- Died: 19 December 2010 Thiruvananthapuram, Kerala

Sport
- Country: India
- Sport: Running
- Event: 400 metres
Medal record
Men's athletics
Representing India
Asian Games
Bronze medal – third place	1978 Bangkok	400 m
Silver medal – second place	1978 Bangkok	4x400 m
Asian Championships
Bronze medal – third place	1981 Tokyo	4×400 m

Murali Kuttan (1953? – 19 December 2010) was an Indian track and field athlete who represented the country as a sprinter on several occasions. He won the 400 metres gold in the Indo-Russian athletic meet in 1978. In the same year, he also won the bronze in the 400 metres at the Asian Games in Bangkok. He was married to former olympian athlete Mercy Kuttan.

== Career ==
Hailing from Punnapra, in Alappuzha district, Murali Kuttan was a late bloomer in his favourite sport. He initially competed in the shorter versions of the sprint, 100 metres and 200 metres. Success came his way after joining the Indian Army in 1974 and after he switched his attention to the 400 metres. He was national champion in 400 m during 1975 to 84. His personal best time in 400m was 46.8 s.

One of his first international success came in the Indo-Russian athletic meet in 1978 where he won the 400m gold. In the same year, at the Bangkok Asian Games, Murali won the 400 m bronze behind Abbas Al Aibi of Iraq and compatriot Uday K. Prabhu. With the latter, Murali shared a healthy rivalry through the most part of the 1970s. He was also a member of the silver medal winning Indian team in the 4 × 400 m relay at the 1978 Bangkok Asian Games. In 1981, he won the bronze in the 4 × 400 m relay at the Asian Athletics Championships in Tokyo.

Murali took a diploma in coaching from the Netaji National Institute of Sports in Calcutta in 1985 before joining TISCO, Jamshedpur as an athletic coach.

== Personal life ==
Muralikuttan was married to Mercy Kuttan, a former athlete who represented India at the 1988 Seoul Olympics. He and Mercy had met at the selection camp for the 1980 Moscow Olympics. They married two years later. They were the first Indian athletic couple to emerge National champions and win Asian medals. Murlai took the role of the coach and had influenced Mercy to shift from long jump to 400 metre. Both Murali and Mercy worked for Tata Steel, Jamshedpur. They set up the "Mercy Kuttan Athletics Academy" in Kochi, a non-profit organisation to train promising youth for major international competitions. He had been training his younger son Sujith Kuttan with the 2014 Olympics as the goal.

Death

On 19 December 2010 at 1.30 am, Murali Kuttan suffered a massive heart attack and died at a private hospital in Thiruvananthapuram. He came to the city, along with his wife and son Sujith Kuttan, in connection with the ongoing 54th Kerala State Schools athletics meet. Sujith won the senior boys' 100m gold medal with a new meet record without knowing that his father had died in the previous night.
