= Hakam Singh =

Indian athlete (died 2018)

Medal record

Men's athletics

Representing India

Asian Championships
Gold medal – first place	1979 Tokyo	20 km walk

Hakam Singh (died 14 August 2018) was an Indian athlete who won the gold medal at the 1978 Asian Games in 20 kilometre race walk. He also won a gold in the Asian Track and Field Meeting held at Tokyo in 1979. He is a recipient of the Dhyan Chand Award.

Singh died in Sangrur, Punjab on 14 August 2018 at age 64.
