= Fahim Abdul-Sada =

Iraqi sprinter

Fahim Abdul Al-Sada
Personal information
- Nationality: Iraqi
- Born: 20 December 1955 (age 70)

Sport
- Sport: Sprinting
- Event: 4 × 400 metres relay
Medal record
Men's athletics
Representing Iraq
Asian Championships
Gold medal – first place	1979 Tokyo	4×400 m
Gold medal – first place	1983 Kuwait City	4×400 m
Gold medal – first place	1985 Jakarta	4×400 m
Silver medal – second place	1981 Tokyo	4×400 m

Fahim Abdul-Sada (Arabic: فاهم عبد السادة, born 20 December 1955) is an Iraqi sprinter. He competed in the men's 4 × 400 metres relay at the 1980 Summer Olympics.
