= Abbas Laibi =

Iraqi sprinter

Medal record

Men's athletics

Representing Iraq

Asian Championships
Gold medal – first place	1979 Tokyo	4×400 m
Silver medal – second place	1979 Tokyo	400 m
Silver medal – second place	1981 Tokyo	4×400 m

Abbas Laibi Munshid (Arabic: عباس لعيبي منشد; born 1952) is an Iraqi former sprinter who competed in the 1980 Summer Olympics.
