= Usanee Laopinkarn =

Thai runner

Personal information
- Nationality: Thai

Sport
- Country: Thailand
- Sport: Athletics
Medal record
Women's athletics
Representing Thailand
Asian Games
Gold medal – first place	1978 Bangkok	200 m
Gold medal – first place	1978 Bangkok	4×100 m
Bronze medal – third place	1978 Bangkok	100 m
Asian Championships
Silver medal – second place	1979 Tokyo	4×100 m
Silver medal – second place	1981 Tokyo	100 m
Silver medal – second place	1981 Tokyo	4×100 m

Usanee Laopinkarn is a Thai athlete. She won gold medals in the 200 metres and in the 4 × 100 m relay and a bronze medal in the individual 100 meters in the 1978 Asian Games.
