= Tomomi Takahashi (pole vaulter) =

Japanese pole vaulter (born 1956)

Personal information
- Nationality: Japanese
- Born: 29 January 1956 (age 70) Kagawa Prefecture, Japan
- Height: 179 cm (5 ft 10 in)
- Weight: 63 kg (139 lb)

Sport
- Sport: Athletics
- Event: Pole vault
Medal record
Men's athletics
Representing Japan
Asian Championships
Gold medal – first place	1981 Tokyo	Pole vault
Silver medal – second place	1979 Tokyo	Pole vault
Asian Games
Gold medal – first place	1978 Bangkok	Pole vault
Gold medal – first place	1982 New Delhi	Pole vault

Tomomi Takahashi (高橋 卓巳, Takahashi Tomomi; born 29 January 1956) is a Japanese former pole vaulter who competed in the 1984 Summer Olympics.

Takahashi won the British AAA Championships title in the pole vault event at the 1982 AAA Championships.
