= Akemi Masuda =

Japanese long-distance runner

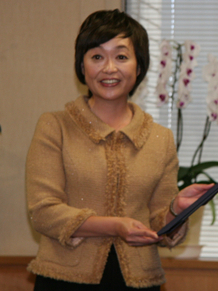
- Masuda in 2007

Medal record

Women's athletics

Representing Japan

Asian Championships
Gold medal – first place	1981 Tokyo	3000 m

Akemi Masuda (Japanese: 増田 明美; born January 1, 1964) is a retired Japanese female long-distance runner. She competed for Japan at the 1984 Summer Olympics in Los Angeles, California, although she failed to finish the race. Masuda set her personal best in the classic distance (2:30:30) in 1983.

She rose to prominence with a gold medal on the track over 3000 metres at the 1981 Asian Athletics Championships and by winning the inaugural 20 km women's race at the Sapporo Half Marathon event. She continued to focus on road events and won at the 1982 Chiba Marathon and the 1983 Nike OTC Marathon. Her 2:30:30 at age 19 in that race was the World Junior Record. She was the runner-up at the 1984 Osaka Ladies Marathon, a result which led to her the starting line of the first Olympic women's marathon. Among her other results, she was third at the 1989 Hokkaido Marathon and took 19th place at the 1990 London Marathon.

== Achievements ==
Year	Competition	Venue	Position	Event	Notes
Representing the Japan
1981	Asian Championships	Tokyo, Japan	1st	3000 m	9:18.17
1982	Chiba Marathon	Chiba, Japan	1st	Marathon	2:36:34
1983	Osaka International Women's Marathon	Osaka, Japan	—	Marathon	—
1983	Nike OTC Marathon	Eugene, Oregon	1st	Marathon	2:30:30
1984	Osaka International Women's Marathon	Osaka, Japan	2nd	Marathon	
1984	Olympic Games	Los Angeles, United States	—	Marathon	DNF
