= Kunimitsu Itō =

Japanese long-distance runner

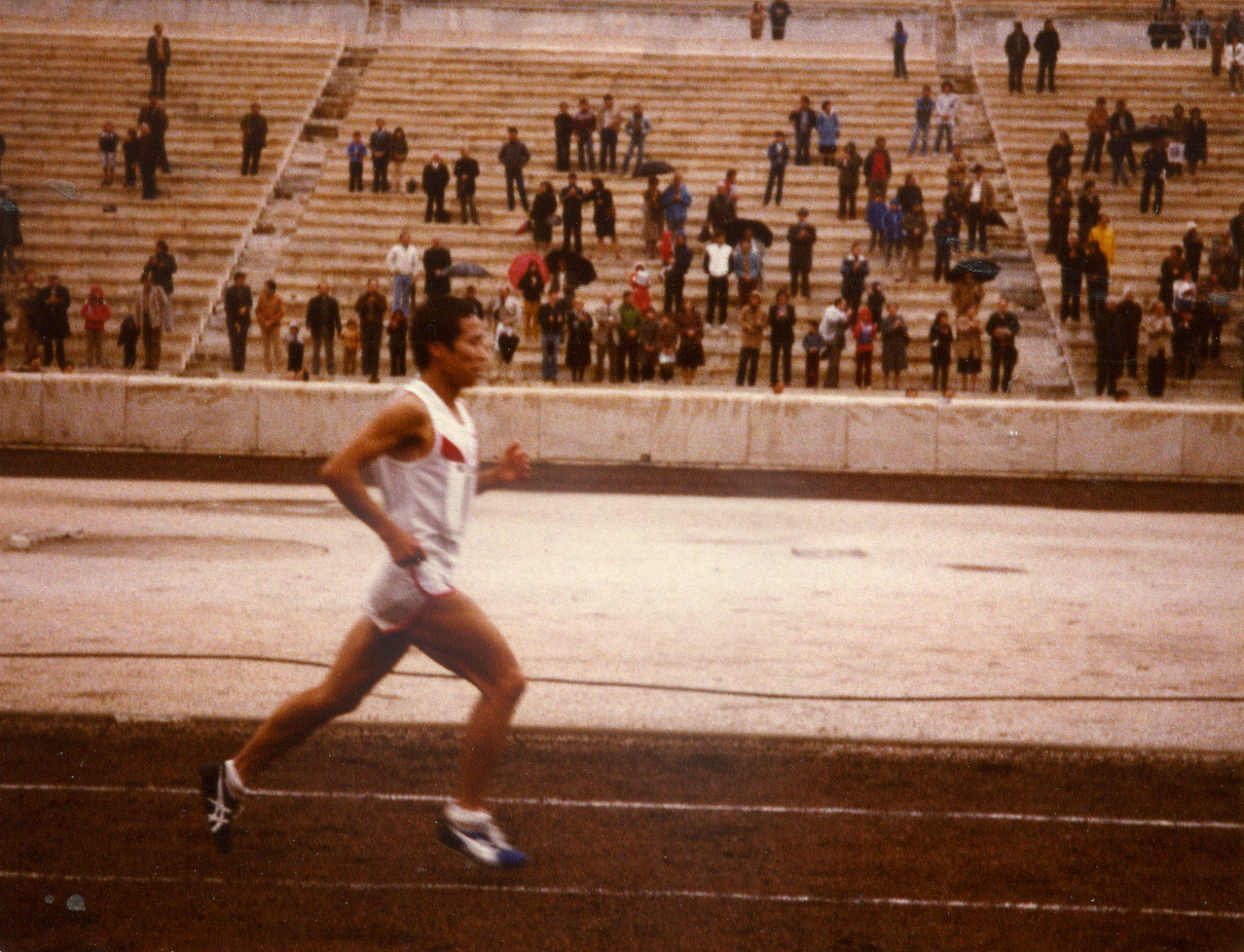
- Itoh finishing the IAAF Citizen Golden Marathon in Athens, Greece in 1982 in 2:16:05 for 9th position

Medal record

Men's athletics

Representing Japan

Asian Championships
Gold medal – first place	1975 Seoul	5000 m
Gold medal – first place	1981 Tokyo	10,000 m
Silver medal – second place	1979 Tokyo	10,000 m

Kunimitsu Itō (伊藤 国光, Itō Kunimitsu; born January 6, 1955 in Ina, Nagano) is a retired long-distance runner from Japan, who finished second in the 1981 edition of the Fukuoka Marathon on December 6, 1981.

== International competitions ==
Year	Competition	Venue	Position	Event	Notes
Representing Japan
1975	Asian Championships	Seoul, South Korea	1st	5000 m	14:00.8
1979	Asian Championships	Tokyo, Japan	2nd	10,000 m	29:00.2
1981	Asian Championships	Tokyo, Japan	1st	10,000 m	28:53.29
1983	World Championships	Helsinki, Finland	28th	10,000 m	29:49.04

== Marathons ==
Year	Competition	Venue	Position	Event	Notes
1981	Fukuoka Marathon	Fukuoka, Japan	2nd	Marathon	2:09:37
1982	Fukuoka Marathon	Fukuoka, Japan	4th	Marathon	2:11:45
