= Geeta Zutshi =

Indian athlete

Medal record

Women's athletics

Representing India

Asian Championships
Gold medal – first place	1981 Tokyo	800 m
Silver medal – second place	1981 Tokyo	1500 m

Geeta Zutshi (born 2 December 1956) is a former Indian track and field athlete. She established several national and Asian running records in the 800 metres and 1500 metres events.

Zutshi won the women's silver medals for the 800 m in 1982, and for the 1500 m in both 1978 and 1982. As the top Indian woman athlete at the 1982 Asian Games in New Delhi, she took the oath on behalf of the competitors during the opening ceremony. For her achievements she has been awarded the Arjuna award and the Padma Shri.

She has inspired other Indian women, such as Bachendri Pal, the first Indian woman to successfully climb Mount Everest. As a child, Pal began to aspire to national fame after seeing a newspaper photograph of Zutshi with Prime Minister Indira Gandhi.

She was coached by Mohammad Ilyas Babar. After 17 years in the United States, she returned to India in July, 2002, and took over as coach of the Indian junior athletics team (800 m and 1500 m).

== International competitions ==
Year	Competition	Venue	Position	Notes
1978	Asian Games	Bangkok, Thailand	1st	800 m
1978	Asian Games	Bangkok, Thailand	2nd	1500 m
1981	Asian Championships	Tokyo, Japan	1st	800 m
1981	Asian Championships	Tokyo, Japan	2nd	1500 m
1982	Asian Games	New Delhi, India	2nd	800 m
1982	Asian Games	New Delhi, India	2nd	1500 m

== See also ==
- List of Indian sportswomen
