= Kazunori Koshikawa =

Japanese high jumper (born 1956)

Personal information
- Nationality: Japanese
- Born: 23 January 1956 (age 70)

Sport
- Sport: Athletics
- Event: High jump
Medal record
Men's athletics
Representing Japan
Asian Games
Silver medal – second place	1978 Bangkok	High jump
Asian Championships
Gold medal – first place	1979 Tokyo	High jump
Silver medal – second place	1973 Marikina	High jump

Kazunori Koshikawa (越川 一紀, Koshikawa Kazunori; born 23 January 1956) is a Japanese athlete. He competed in the men's high jump at the 1976 Summer Olympics.
