= Hisayo Fukumitsu =

Japanese high jumper (born 1960)

Personal information
- Nationality: Japanese
- Born: February 19, 1960 (age 66) Tosu, Saga, Japan
Medal record
Women's Athletics
Representing Japan
Asian Games
| Silver medal – second place | 1982 New Delhi | High Jump |
Asian Championships
| Gold medal – first place | 1981 Tokyo | High Jump |
| Bronze medal – third place | 1979 Tokyo | High Jump |

Hisayo Fukumitsu (福光 久代, Fukumitsu Hisayo; married name Morita (森田)) (born February 19, 1960) is a retired female high jumper from Japan. She competed for her native country at the 1984 Summer Olympics in Los Angeles, California, finishing in 17th place in the final rankings with a jump of 1.87 m. She earlier won the gold medal at the 1981 Asian Championships in Tokyo, in a new Asian record of 1.93 m. She was a three-time Japanese Championships champion (1980, 1982 and 1984).

== See also ==
- List of Asian Games medalists in athletics
