= Hassan Kadhim =

Iraqi hurdler (born 1953)

Medal record

Men's athletics

Representing Iraq

Asian Championships
Gold medal – first place	1979 Tokyo	400 m hurdles

Hassan Kadhim Ali (Persian: حسن كاظم علي; born 1 July 1953) is an Iraqi former hurdler who competed in the 1980 Summer Olympics.
