= Hisatoshi Shintaku =

Japanese long-distance runner

Personal information
- Born: December 20, 1957 (age 68) Mihara, Hiroshima, Japan

Sport
- Sport: Marathon running
Medal record
Representing Japan
Asian Games
Gold medal – first place	1978 Bangkok	3000m steeplechase
Gold medal – first place	1982 New Delhi	5000m
Gold medal – first place	1986 Seoul	10,000m
Silver medal – second place	1986 Seoul	5000m
Asian Championships
Gold medal – first place	1979 Tokyo	3000 m steeplechase
Gold medal – first place	1981 Tokyo	3000 m steeplechase

Hisatoshi Shintaku (新宅 永灯至, Shintaku Hisatoshi; born December 20, 1957), also known as Masanari Shintaku (新宅雅也, Shintaku Masanari), is a retired long-distance runner from Japan. He won the 1985 edition of the Fukuoka Marathon, clocking 2:09:51 on December 1, 1985. He represented his native country at the 1988 Summer Olympics, finishing in 17th place (2:15:42).

== Competition record ==
Year	Competition	Venue	Position	Event	Notes
1984	Olympic Games	Los Angeles, United States	16th	10,000 m	28:55.54
1985	Tokyo Marathon	Tokyo, Japan	3rd	Marathon	2:12:23
1985	Fukuoka Marathon	Fukuoka, Japan	1st	Marathon	2:09:51
1987	Fukuoka Marathon	Fukuoka, Japan	2nd	Marathon	2:10:34
1988	Olympic Games	Seoul, South Korea	17th	Marathon	2:15:42
1990	Rotterdam Marathon	Rotterdam, Netherlands	4th	Marathon	2:15:17
1990	Berlin Marathon	Berlin, Germany	8th	Marathon	2:12:49
