= Toshio Toyota =

Japanese sprinter

Personal information
- Nationality: Japanese
- Born: 19 July 1956 (age 70) Hitoyoshi, Kumamoto, Japan
- Education: Kumamoto Prefectural Taragi High School

Sport
- Country: Japan
- Sport: Track and field
- Events: 100 metres 200 metres
- Retired: 1987

Achievements and titles
- Personal bests: 100 m: 10.41 (1982); 200 m: 20.81 (1982)
Medal record
Men's athletics
Representing Japan
Asian Games
Silver medal – second place	1982 New Delhi	200 m
Bronze medal – third place	1982 New Delhi	4×100 m relay
Asian Championships
Gold medal – first place	1981 Tokyo	200 m
Gold medal – first place	1981 Tokyo	4×100 m relay
Bronze medal – third place	1979 Tokyo	200 m

Toshio Toyota (豊田 敏夫, Toyota Toshio; born 19 July 1956) is a Japanese retired sprinter. He qualified for the 1980 Japan Olympic team but did not compete due to the 1980 Summer Olympics boycott. He was the gold medallist in the 200 metres and 4 × 100 metres relay at the 1981 Asian Championships and the first Japanese to run under 21 seconds with electronic timing in the 200 metres.

== Personal bests ==
- 100 metres – 10.41 (1982)
- 200 metres – 20.81 (1982) - Former national record

== International competitions ==
Year	Competition	Venue	Position	Event	Notes
Representing Japan and Asia (World Cup only)
1977	World Cup	Düsseldorf, West Germany	6th	200 m	21.24 (wind: +1.0 m/s)
1979	Asian Championships	Tokyo, Japan	3rd	200 m	21.39
1981	Asian Championships	Tokyo, Japan	5th	100 m	10.75
1981	Asian Championships	Tokyo, Japan	1st	200 m	20.99
1981	Asian Championships	Tokyo, Japan	1st	4×100 m relay	39.86 (relay leg: 2nd)
1981	World Cup	Rome, Italy	8th	200 m	21.39 (wind: +0.1 m/s)
1981	World Cup	Rome, Italy	7th	4×100 m relay	40.07 (relay leg: 1st)
1982	Asian Games	New Delhi, India	2nd	200 m	21.13
1982	Asian Games	New Delhi, India	3rd	4×100 m relay	39.97 (relay leg: 4th)

== National titles ==
- Japanese Championships
  - 100 m: 1977, 1979
  - 200 m: 1977, 1979, 1980, 1982
