= Gopal Saini =

Indian middle-distance runner

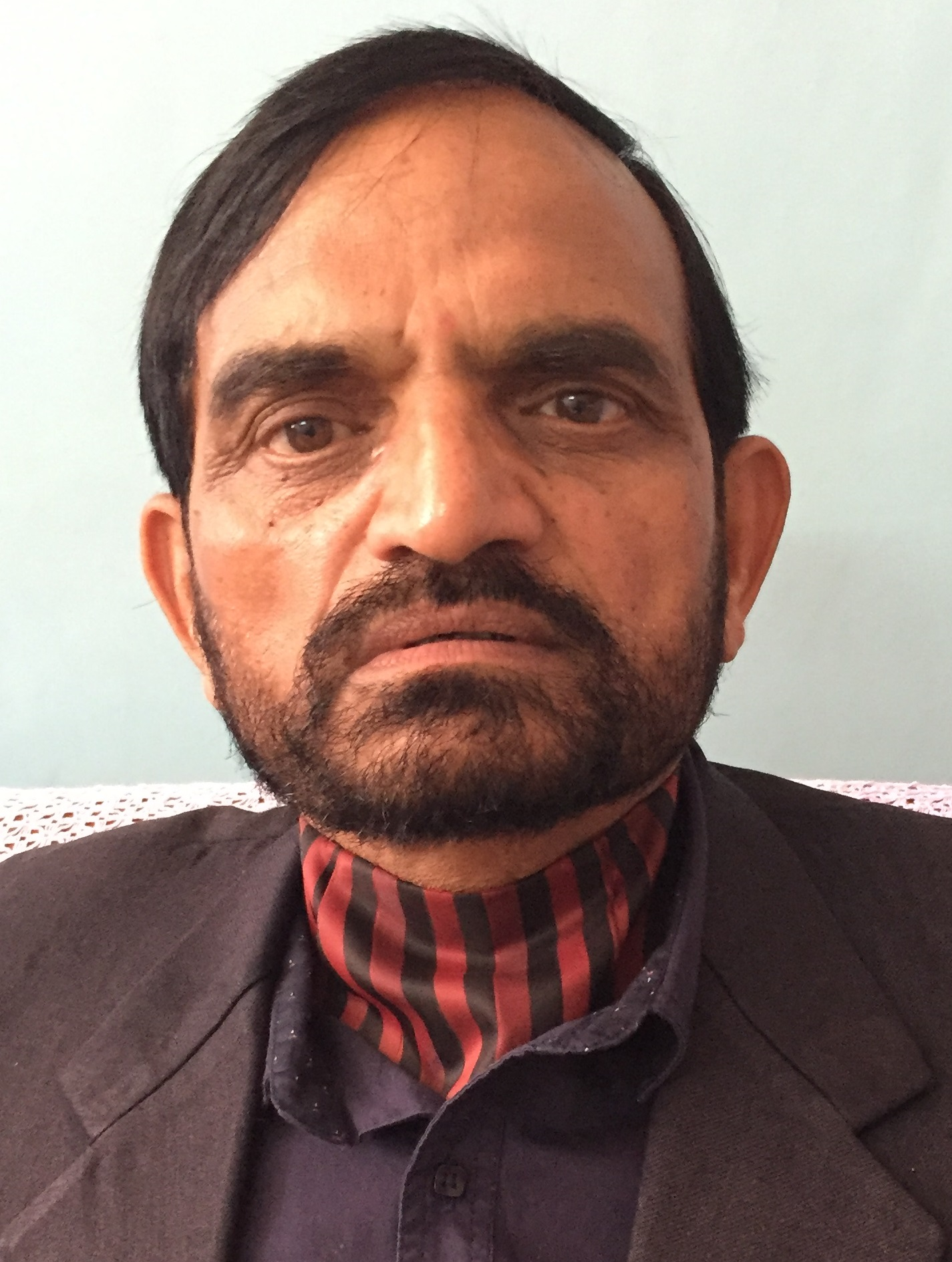

Personal information
- National team: India
- Born: 1954 Rajasthan, India

Sport
- Sport: Middle distance runner
Medal record
Men's athletics
Representing India
Asian Championships
Gold medal – first place	1981 Tokyo	5000 m
Silver medal – second place	1981 Tokyo	3000 m st.
Bronze medal – third place	1979 Tokyo	5000 m
Bronze medal – third place	1979 Tokyo	3000 m st.
Asian Games
Silver medal – second place	1978 Bangkok	3000 m st.
Silver medal – second place	1982 new delhi	3000 m st.

Gopal Saini (born 1954) is a former Indian middle-distance runner. He held the national record in 3000 meters Steeplechase which was unbeaten for 37 years. Saini set the 3000m Steeplechase record (8:30.88) in Tokyo, Japan on 5 June 1981 which was then broken by Avinash Sable by clocking 8:29.80 at the 2018 National Open Championships in Bhubaneswar. Sable set a new national record of 8:11.20 in August 2022 at the 2022 Commonwealth Games in Birmingham.Saini represented in 1980 22nd olympic games in Soviet Union for men's 5000m race.

He hails from Rajasthan. He was conferred Arjuna award in 1981 for his achievements. He practiced on terrains for strength of legs. He currently works in SBBJ and also owns a restaurant in Jaipur.
