= Shigenobu Murofushi =

Japanese hammer thrower

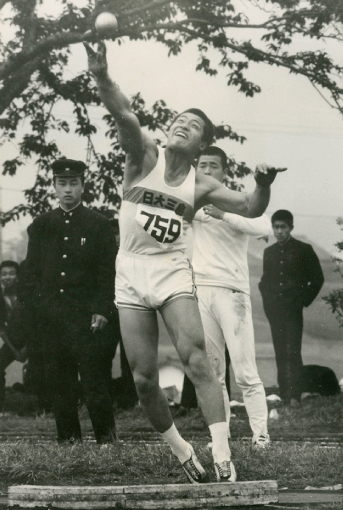
- Murofushi c. 1960

Personal information
- Born: October 2, 1945 (age 80) Tangshan, Hebei, China

Sport
- Sport: Hammer throw
Medal record
Men's athletics
Representing Japan
Asian Games
Gold medal – first place	1970 Bangkok	Hammer throw
Gold medal – first place	1974 Tehran	Hammer throw
Gold medal – first place	1978 Bangkok	Hammer throw
Gold medal – first place	1982 New Dehli	Hammer throw
Gold medal – first place	1986 Seoul	Hammer throw
Silver medal – second place	1966 Bangkok	Hammer throw
Asian Championships
Gold medal – first place	1979 Tokyo	Hammer throw
Gold medal – first place	1981 Tokyo	Hammer throw
Summer Universiade
Bronze medal – third place	1967 Tokyo	Hammer throw

Shigenobu Murofushi (室伏 重信, Murofushi Shigenobu; born October 2, 1945) is a retired Japanese hammer thrower. He competed at the 1972, 1976 and 1984 Olympics and finished in 8th, 11th and 14th place, respectively. He was the flag bearer for Japan at the 1984 Olympics.

On September 29, 1972, Murofushi married Serafina Moritz, a javelin thrower who competed internationally for Romania. Both of their children, Koji Murofushi and Yuka Murofushi, are retired Olympic hammer throwers.

Murofushi tried sumo and shot put before changing to the hammer. In 1984 he set a Japanese record at 75.96 m that stood until 1998 when it was broken by his son Koji.

== International competitions ==
Representing Japan
Year	Competition	Venue	Position	Notes
1966	Asian Games	Bangkok, Thailand	2nd	
1970	Asian Games	Bangkok, Thailand	1st	
1972	Olympic Games	Munich, West Germany	8th	
1974	Asian Games	Tehran, Iran	1st	
1976	Olympic Games	Montreal, Canada	11th	
1978	Asian Games	Bangkok, Thailand	1st	
1979	Asian Championships	Tokyo, Japan	1st	
1981	Asian Championships	Tokyo, Japan	1st	
1982	Asian Games	New Delhi, India	1st	
1983	World Championships	Helsinki, Finland	16th	
1984	Olympic Games	Los Angeles, United States	15th	
1986	Asian Games	Seoul, South Korea	1st	

== See also ==
- List of professional sports families
- List of flag bearers for Japan at the Olympics
- List of Asian Games medalists in athletics
