= Kamla Nagar, Delhi =

Kamla Nagar
- Neighborhood of Delhi
- Location within Delhi
- Coordinates: 28°40′50″N 77°12′13″E
- Country: India
- State: Delhi
- District: Central Delhi
- Metro: Delhi

Languages
  - Official: Hindi
- Time zone: UTC+5:30 (IST)
- Postal code: 110007

Map showing the nine districts of Delhi.

Kamla Nagar is a residential and commercial neighbourhood in Central Delhi, India. It is one of Delhi's major shopping centres.

== History ==
Kamla Nagar is named after Kamala Nehru, a freedom fighter and wife of Jawaharlal Nehru, India's first prime minister. The neighbourhood rose to prominence after the erection of Ram Swarup Clock Tower on the Grand Trunk Road in 1941, and the construction of Jaipuria and Birla textile mills. It was also a stop on the erstwhile Delhi Tram Service. In the 1950s, it was developed as an affluent residential area. It is the present-day site of the former Gurjar village of Chandrawal.

Kamla Nagar, and its adjoining neighbourhoods, were a centre of political activity during the late British Raj and the first two decades after Independence. Freedom fighters and political personalities like Aruna Asaf Ali, Guru Radha Kishan, Bharatiya Jana Sangh, General Secretary Kanwar Lal Gupta, Purshottam Goyal, Murari Lal Gupta Chharia, Baba Ram Swaroop and Shivcharan Gupta were active there.

It was also a cultural hub after Independence with Gulzar, Santosh Anand and Manoj Kumar being active there during some part of their lives before becoming popular in Bollywood. Wrestlers like Dara Singh, Guru Hanuman, Satpal Singh, Bhupendra Dhawan and Maha Singh Rao trained in the akharas of the area.

Kamla Nagar was the venue of Guru Radha Kishan's 24-day fast to support the rights of labour unions of the textile mills. Kishan was elected the youngest member of the Delhi Municipal Committee.

== Overview ==
Kamla Nagar is surrounded by New Chandrawal Village, University of Delhi's north campus and Kamla Nehru Ridge Forest on the east, Roop Nagar on the north, Shakti Nagar on the west and Malka Ganj on the south. The Grand Trunk Road separates Kamla Nagar from Shakti Nagar.

Kamla Nagar shares much of its character and history with the adjoining neighbourhoods of Shakti Nagar, Roop Nagar, and Malka Ganj. It was built as a residential colony in the 1950s, divided into six blocks with three roundabouts, and contains a mix of apartment buildings and bungalows. Kamla Nagar was developed and sold by DLF, a company of Ch. Raghubir Singh.

== Shopping hub of Delhi ==
Although originally built as a residential colony, the neighborhood has transformed into a major commercial center of Delhi, and one of the most prominent in Central Delhi. The commercial streets house a mix of international brands and Indian stores, mostly located on and around Bungalow Road, opposite Hans Raj College. The retail stores and restaurants are located on lower floors of the market while the upper stories have remained residential.

Indian street-food stands, Chinese fast-food stands and street-side apparel shops are also characteristic of these commercial streets. In addition, the neighborhood includes chain restaurants such as McDonald's, Cafe Coffee Day and Domino's.

More recently, Kamla Nagar has been converting into a ladies' high-street shopping center where one can find western and ethnic clothing, along with cheaper street-bargain shopping. During the sale periods of July–August and February–March, people come to the market for all types of apparel shopping. There are various footwear stores that have opened in recent times.

== Places of interest ==
The 17th century Roshanara Garden and the adjacent 19th-century Roshanara Club are located in Shakti Nagar. Kamla Nehru Ridge Forest, which lies to the east of Kamla Nagar, contains historic monuments such as the Mutiny Memorial, Flagstaff Tower and one of the several Ashoka Pillars. Ram Swarup Clock Tower sits on the southern edge of Kamla Nagar. Delhi Vidhan Sabha and Viceregal Lodge of Delhi (now the Vice Chancellor's residence) are nearby.

== Education ==
University of Delhi's North campus lies to the east of Kamla Nagar. Hansraj College, Faculty of Law (FoL), Faculty of Management Studies (FMS), Delhi School of Economics, St. Stephen's College, Hindu College, Shri Ram College of Commerce, Daulat Ram College, SGTB Khalsa College, Miranda House, Kirori Mal College, Ramjas College and Indraprastha College for Women are some of the prominent educational and research institutions in the vicinity.

== Transport ==
=== Metro rail ===
Vishwavidyalaya metro station on the Yellow Line and Pul Bangash metro station on the Red Line are the closest Delhi Metro stations.

=== Buses ===
- 19
- 100A
- 108
- 108A
- 114
- 234-1
- 234
- 816
- 912

=== Indian Railways ===
The nearest railway station is Subzi Mandi.

== Hospitals ==
- Hindu Rao Hospital and Medical College, Malka Ganj
- Vallabhbhai Patel Chest Institute
- Sant Parmanand Hospital, Civil Lines
- North Delhi Pathology Clinic
