= Gulab =

Gulab or Gulaab (Persian: گلاب gulāb) is a Persian compound noun meaning "rose water". The noun or name is combined from two nouns "gul" (گل) which is the generic word for "flower" or the name for "rose", and "āb" (اب) which means "water".

Generally the noun is also used as a name and a nickname in Persian poetry to mean "sweetheart, lover, and rose". It is used in Iran, Turkey, Central Asia, Afghanistan, Pakistan and India.

It may refer to:

== People ==
- Gulab Chand Kataria, the former Home Minister in the government of Rajasthan
- Gulab Khandelwal (born 1924), Indian poet born in Navalgarh, Rajasthan
- Gulab Singh of Jammu and Kashmir (1792–1857), the founder and first Maharaja of the princely state of Jammu and Kashmir
- Gulab Singh Shaktawat (died 2006), Indian freedom fighter, social and political worker of Indian National Congress
- Gulab Bai, first female artist of the traditional Indian operatic drama

== Places ==
- Gulab, Iran, village in Iran
- Gulab, Fereydunshahr, village in Iran
- Gulab, Tiran and Karvan, village in Iran
- Gulab-e Sofla, village in Iran
- Gulab-e Vosta, village in Iran
- Gulab Bari, Garden of roses
- Gulabganj, village in Madhya Pradesh, India
- Gulabganj, village in Uttar Pradesh, India
- Gulabpura, town in India
- Gulabbagh, locality in India

== See also ==
- Gulabi (disambiguation)
- Golab (disambiguation)
- Cyclones Gulab and Shaheen, North Indian Ocean cyclones in 2021
- Bhela Gulab Singh, town and Union Council of Depalpur Tehsil in Punjab Province, Pakistan
- Gulab Bagh and Zoo (Sajjan Niwas Garden), the largest garden in Udaipur, Rajasthan, Indian
- Gulab jamun, a dessert
- Gulab Gang, a 2014 Indian film
