= List of National Sports Award recipients in wrestling =

National Sports Awards in Wrestling
- Various civilian awards for contributions to Sports (Individual/Team)
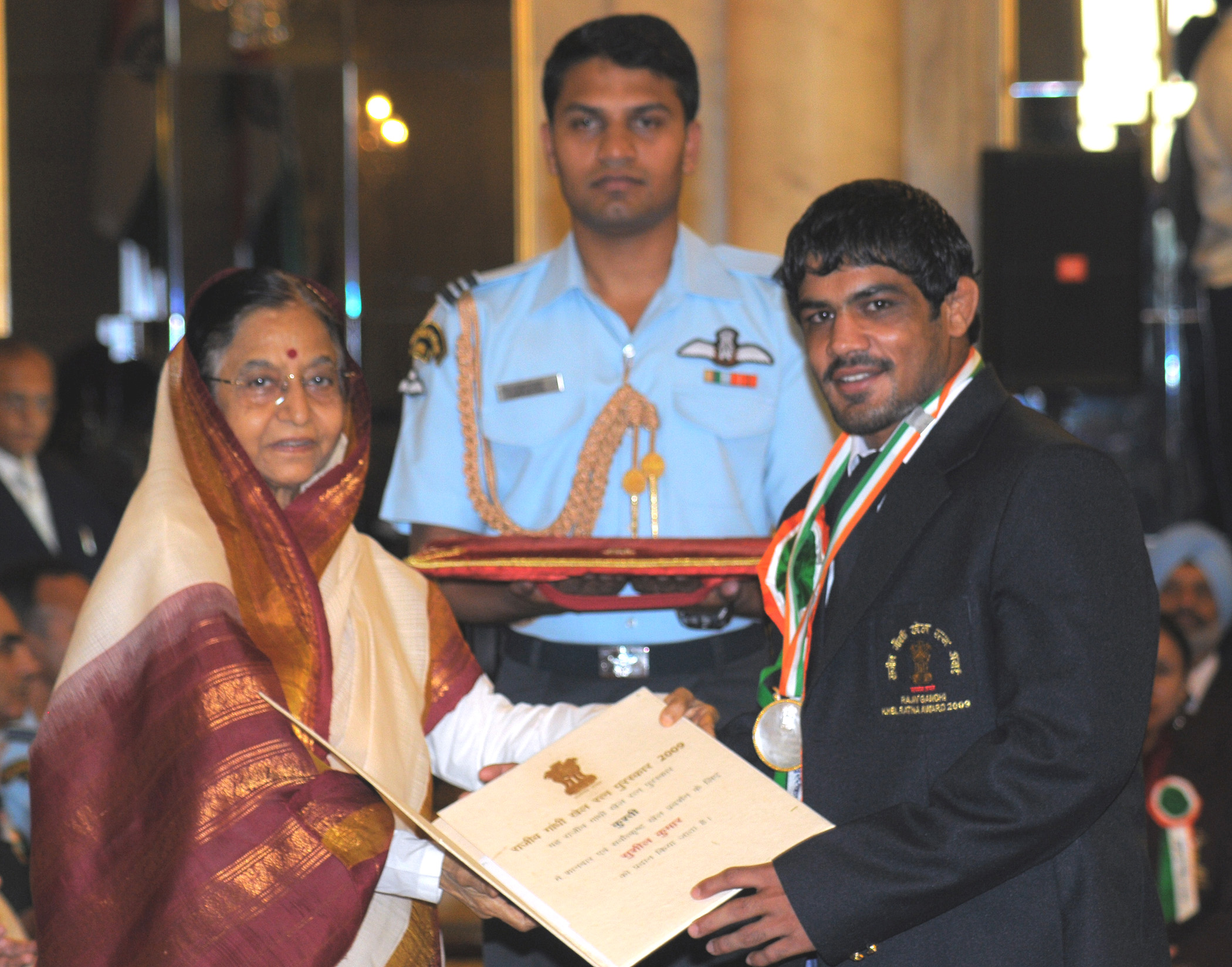
- Awarded for: Various sports honour of India
- Sponsored by: Government of India
- Location: Rashtrapati Bhavan
- Country: Republic of India
- Presented by: President of India
- First award: 1961
- Final award: 2024

Highlights
- Total awarded: 92
- Awards: Arjuna Award; Dronacharya Award; Major Dhyan Chand Khel Ratna; Dhyan Chand Award

The National Sports Awards is the collective name given to the six sports awards of Republic of India. It is awarded annually by the Ministry of Youth Affairs and Sports. They are presented by the President of India in the same ceremony at the Rashtrapati Bhavan usually on 29 August each year along with the national adventure award. As of 2020, a total of eighty-eight individuals have been awarded the various National Sports Awards in wrestling. The four awards presented in wrestling are Major Dhyan Chand Khel Ratna, Arjuna Award, Dhyan Chand Award and Dronacharya Award.

First presented in the year 1961, a total of fifty-six individuals have been honoured with the Arjuna Award in wrestling for their "good performance at the international level" over the period of last four years, with three individuals being awarded for their lifetime contribution. First presented in the year 1985, a total of fifteen coaches have been honoured with the Dronacharya Award in wrestling for their "outstanding work on a consistent basis and enabling sportspersons to excel in international events" over the period of last four years, with four coaches being awarded in the lifetime contribution category. First presented in the year 2009, a total of six sportspersons have been honoured with the Khel Ratna, the highest sporting honour of India, in wrestling for their "most outstanding performance at the international level" over the period of last four years. First presented in the year 2005, a total of twelve retired sportspersons have been honoured with the Dhyan Chand Award, the lifetime achievement sporting honour of India, in wrestling for their "good performance at the international level and their continued contributions to the promotion of sports even after their career as a sportsperson is over." One awardee K. D. Jadhav was honoured Arjuna Award posthumously for lifetime contribution in the year 2000.

== Recipients ==
Key
+ Indicates a Lifetime contribution honour	# Indicates a posthumous honour

List of National Sports award recipients, showing the year, award and gender
Year	Recipient	Award	Gender
2009	Sushil Kumar	Rajiv Gandhi Khel Ratna	Male
2012	Yogeshwar Dutt	Rajiv Gandhi Khel Ratna	Male
2016	Sakshi Malik	Rajiv Gandhi Khel Ratna	Female
2019	Bajrang Punia	Rajiv Gandhi Khel Ratna	Male
2020	Vinesh Phogat	Rajiv Gandhi Khel Ratna	Female
2021	Ravi Kumar Dahiya	Major Dhyan Chand Khel Ratna	Male
1961	Udey Chand	Arjuna Award	Male
1962	Malwa Singh	Arjuna Award	Male
1963	Ganpatrao Andhalkar	Arjuna Award	Male
1964	Bishambar Singh	Arjuna Award	Male
1966	Bhim Singh	Arjuna Award	Male
1967	Mukhtiar Singh	Arjuna Award	Male
1969	Chandgi Ram	Arjuna Award	Male
1970	Sudesh Kumar	Arjuna Award	Male
1972	Prem Nath	Arjuna Award	Male
1973	Jagroop Singh	Arjuna Award	Male
1974	Satpal Singh	Arjuna Award	Male
1978–1979	Rajinder Singh	Arjuna Award	Male
1980–1981	Jagmander Singh	Arjuna Award	Male
1982	Kartar Singh	Arjuna Award	Male
1985	Mahabir Singh	Arjuna Award	Male
1987	Subhash Verma	Arjuna Award	Male
1988	Rajesh Kumar	Arjuna Award	Male
1989	Satyawan	Arjuna Award	Male
1990	Ombir Singh	Arjuna Award	Male
1992	Pappu Yadav	Arjuna Award	Male
1993	Ashok Kumar Garg	Arjuna Award	Male
1997	Sanjay Kumar	Arjuna Award	Male
1997	Jagdish Singh	Arjuna Award	Male
1998	Kaka Pawar	Arjuna Award	Male
1998	Rohtas Singh	Arjuna Award	Male
1999	Ashok Kumar ^{+}	Arjuna Award	Male
2000	K. D. Jadhav^{#} ^{+}	Arjuna Award ^{+}	Male
2000	Naresh Kumar ^{+}	Arjuna Award	Male
2000	Kripa Shankar Patel	Arjuna Award	Male
2000	Randhir Singh	Arjuna Award	Male
2001	Ramesh Kumar	Arjuna Award	Male
2002	Palwinder Singh Cheema	Arjuna Award	Male
2002	Sujeet Mann	Arjuna Award	Male
2003	Shokinder Tomar	Arjuna Award	Male
2004	Anuj Kumar	Arjuna Award	Male
2005	Sushil Kumar	Arjuna Award	Male
2006	Geetika Jakhar	Arjuna Award	Female
2007	Alka Tomar	Arjuna Award	Female
2009	Yogeshwar Dutt	Arjuna Award	Male
2010	Rajiv Tomar	Arjuna Award	Male
2011	Ravinder Singh	Arjuna Award	Male
2012	Rajender Kumar	Arjuna Award	Male
2012	Geeta Phogat	Arjuna Award	Female
2012	Narsingh Yadav	Arjuna Award	Male
2013	Dharmender Dalal	Arjuna Award	Male
2013	Neha Rathi	Arjuna Award	Female
2014	Sunil Kumar Rana	Arjuna Award	Male
2015	Babita Kumari	Arjuna Award	Female
2015	Bajrang Punia	Arjuna Award	Male
2016	Amit Kumar Dahiya	Arjuna Award	Male
2016	Vinesh Phogat	Arjuna Award	Female
2017	Satyawart Kadian	Arjuna Award	Male
2018	Sumit Malik	Arjuna Award	Male
2019	Pooja Dhanda	Arjuna Award	Female
2020	Rahul Aware	Arjuna Award	Male
2020	Divya Kakran	Arjuna Award	Female
2021	Deepak Punia	Arjuna Award	Male
2022	Anshu Malik	Arjuna Award	Female
2022	Sarita Mor	Arjuna Award	Female
2023	Sunil Kumar	Arjuna Award	Male
2023	Antim Panghal	Arjuna Award	Female
2024	Aman Sehrawat	Arjuna Award	Male
2005	Maruti Mane	Dhyan Chand Award	Male
2006	Harishchandra Birajdar	Dhyan Chand Award	Male
2007	Rajinder Singh	Dhyan Chand Award	Male
2008	Gian Singh	Dhyan Chand Award	Male
2009	Satbir Singh Dahiya	Dhyan Chand Award	Male
2010	Kuldeep Singh	Dhyan Chand Award	Male
2011	Rajkumar	Dhyan Chand Award	Male
2012	Vinod Kumar	Dhyan Chand Award	Male
2013	Anil Mann	Dhyan Chand Award	Male
2018	Dadu Dattatray Chougale	Dhyan Chand Award	Male
2019	Manoj Kumar	Dhyan Chand Award	Male
2020	Netarpal Hooda	Dhyan Chand Award	Male
2021	Sajan Singh	Dhyan Chand Award	Male
2016	Mahavir Singh Phogat ^{+}	Dronacharya Award	Male
2017	Roshan Lal ^{+}	Dronacharya Award	Male
2020	Om Parkash Dahiya ^{+}	Dronacharya Award	Male
2022	Raj Singh ^{+}	Dronacharya Award	Male
1985	Bhalachandra Bhaskar Bhagwat	Dronacharya Award	Male
1987	Guru Hanuman	Dronacharya Award	Male
2003	Sukhchain Singh Cheema	Dronacharya Award	Male
2005	Maha Singh Rao	Dronacharya Award	Male
2007	Jagminder Singh	Dronacharya Award	Male
2009	Satpal Singh	Dronacharya Award	Male
2010	Captain Chandrup	Dronacharya Award	Male
2011	Ramphal	Dronacharya Award	Male
2012	Yashvir Singh	Dronacharya Award	Male
2013	Raj Singhh	Dronacharya Award	Male
2014	Mahabir Prasad	Dronacharya Award	Male
2015	Anoop Singh Dahiya	Dronacharya Award	Male
2022	Sujeet Maan	Dronacharya Award	Male
2023	Lalit Kumar	Dronacharya Award	Male
