= Shakti Nagar, Delhi =

Shakti Nagar
- Neighborhood of Delhi
- Location in North Delhi, India
- Coordinates: 28.677°N 77.1951°E
- Country: India
- Territory: Delhi (National Capital Region)
- Region: North India
- Town: Delhi

Languages
  - Official: Hindi
- Time zone: UTC+5:30 (IST)
- PIN: 110007

Shakti Nagar is a neighbourhood situated along the G. T. Karnal road and near the main campus of University of Delhi, in the North district of Delhi. The Shakti Nagar colony, spread on both sides of the Inder Chandra Shastri Marg, came into existence in 1950. Comprising close to dwelling units, the colony is split into 39 blocks and has about 22 parks including the famous Nagia Park.

== Overview ==
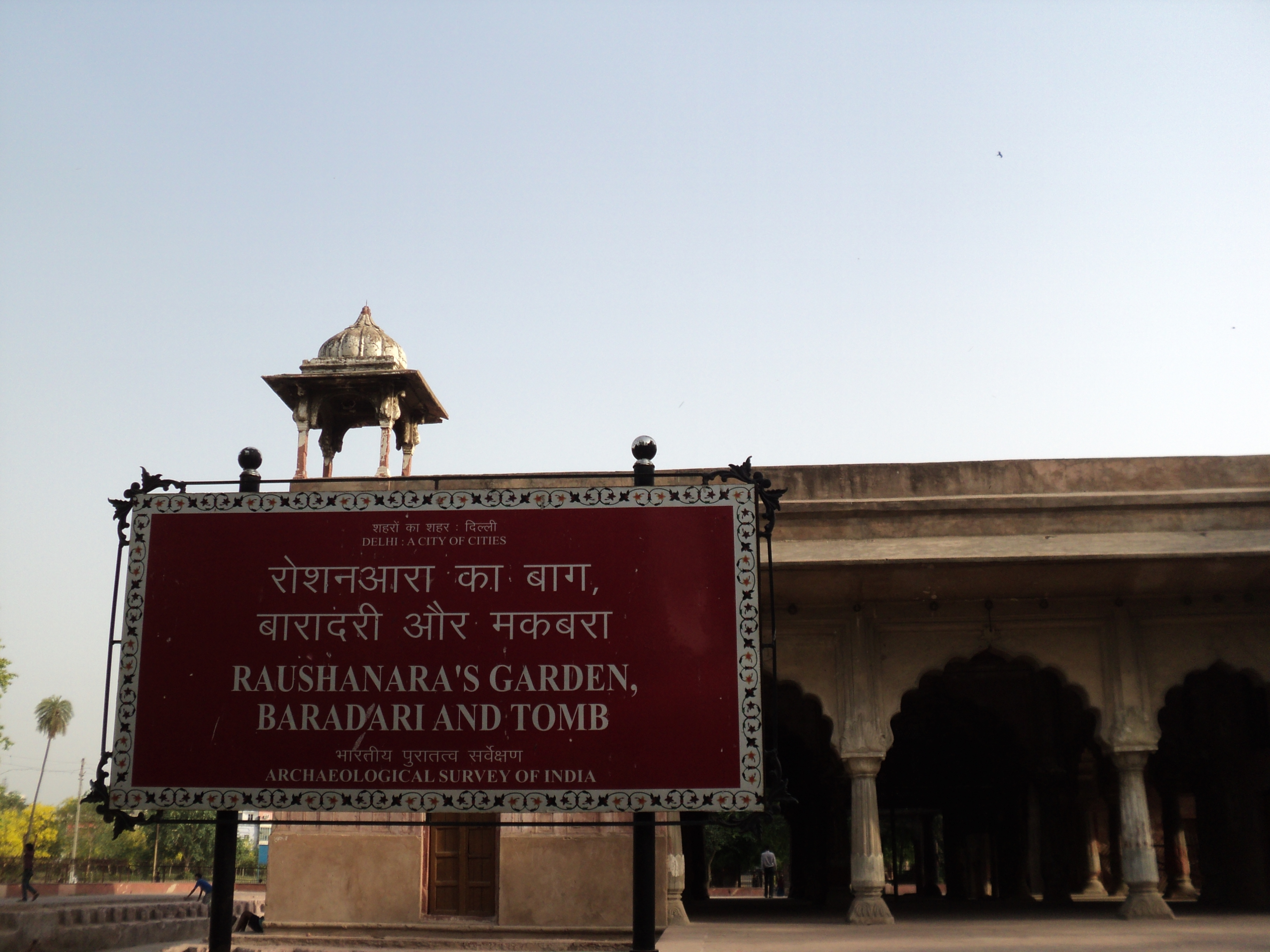
Roshanara Bagh, Baradari and Tomb in Shakti Nagar.

Kamla Nagar is named after Kamala Nehru, a freedom fighter and wife of Jawaharlal Nehru . The neighbourhood rose to prominence after the erection of Ram Swarup Clock Tower on the Grand Trunk Road in 1941, and the construction of Jaipuria and Birla textile mills. It was also a stop of the erstwhile Delhi Tram Service. Later, it was developed as an affluent residential area in 1950s.

Shakti Nagar and its adjoining neighbourhoods were centre of political activity during the late British Raj and the first two decades after Independence. Freedom fighters and political personalities like Aruna Asaf Ali, Guru Radha Kishan, Bharatiya Jana Sangh and General Secretary Kanwar Lal GuptaLala Murari Lal Gupta Chharia were active there. Naresh Gupta Chharia, has started Ist Publishing House unit in Shakti Nagar, in the year 1976 i.e. Indian Books centre, Sri Satguru Publications, Divine Books, Vasu Publications etc., now there are over 30 publishing house of international fame are established in Shakti Nagar.

The Guru Hanuman Akhara was established here in 1925 by Guru Hanuman, is the oldest extant wrestling school in India. Wrestlers like Dara Singh, Guru Hanuman, Jagmander Singh, Satpal Singh, Bhupendra Dhawan and Maha Singh Rao trained in the akharas of the area. It was also a cultural hub after Independence with Gulzar, Santosh Anand and Manoj Kumar being active there during some part of their lives before becoming popular in Bollywood. Established in 1982 North Delhi Pathology Clinic an Accredited Medical Reference laboratory of national repute is situated in this area.

== Neighborhood area ==
Kamla Nagar, Roop Nagar, Gulabi Bagh, Shastri Nagar, Rana Pratap Bagh, Ghanta Ghar Nearby places of interest include the 17th century Roshanara Garden and the adjacent 19th century Roshanara Club in Shakti Nagar. Kamla Nehru Ridge Forest, which lies on the east of Kamla Nagar has historic monuments such as the Mutiny Memorial, Flagstaff Tower and one of the several Ashoka Pillars. Ram Swarup Clock Tower lies on the southern edge of Kamla Nagar. Delhi Vidhan Sabha and Viceregal Lodge of Delhi (now Vice Chancellor's Residence) are also nearby.

== Nearest Metro Station ==
Vishwavidyalaya metro station Pul Bangash Metro Station and Shastri Nagar metro station

DTC 234,181,108,182,115,912,242,816
