= Gulabi =

Gulabi means "rose" in Indian languages and may refer to:

- Gulabi (1995 film), an Indian Telugu-language film
- Gulabi (2014 film), an Indian Marathi-language film
- "Gulabi Sadi", a 2024 Marathi-language song
- Gulabi Talkies, a 2008 Indian Kannada-language film
- Gulabi Bagh, a residential area in northern Delhi, India
- Gulabi Gang, an Indian women vigilante group
- Gulabi (grape), another name for the wine and table grape Black Muscat

== See also ==
- Gulab (disambiguation)
