= Golab, Iran =

Golab or Gelab or Galab (Persian: گلاب) may refer to:

- Golab, Isfahan
- Gelab, Kerman
- Golab-e Bala
- Golab-e Pain
- Gulab, Iran
- Gulab-e Sofla
- Gulab-e Vosta
- Golab Rural District, in Isfahan province
