= Golab =

Golab may refer to rose water. It may also refer to:

== Places ==
- Golab, Iran (disambiguation), places in Iran
- Gołąb (disambiguation), places in Poland

== People ==
- Tony Golab (1919–2016), Canadian football player
- Gołąb (surname), Polish surname

== See also ==
- Gulab (disambiguation)
