= Shaktinagar =

Shaktinagar may refer to:

- Shaktinagar, Uttar Pradesh, India
- Shaktinagar, Karnataka, India
- Shakti nagar, Delhi, India
