= Bharatiya Kushti Patrika =

Newspaper in India

Bhartiya Kushti Patrika
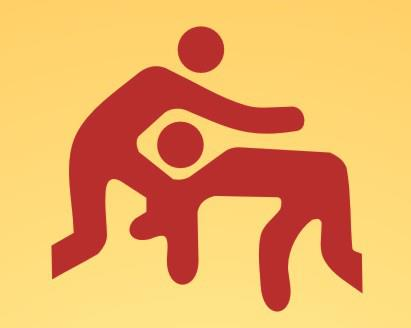
- Type: Monthly magazine
- Founder(s): Ratan Patodi
- Editor-in-chief: Ratan Patodi
- Associate editor: Nakul Patodi
- Founded: 1962
- Language: Hindi
- Headquarters: Indore
- Website: web.archive.org/web/20110905125427/http://www.bhartiyakushti.com/

Bhartiya Kushti Patrika (Hindi: भारतीय कुश्ती पत्रिका) is an Indian monthly sports magazine focusing on Indian-style wrestling, Kushti. It was established by Ratan Pataudi in early 1962. The magazine's main goal is to preserve the literature of Indian Wrestling. Wrestling has been in existence in India since ancient times. This ancient tradition has a significant place in Hindu mythology as Lord Hanuman and Lord Krishna loved to wrestle.

Pataudi has made extreme efforts to compile every possible piece on wrestling in the magazine. This magazine offers information today of classic wrestlers and their achievements such as The Great Gama.

== History ==
While working at Naiduniya, Dada Ratan Pataudi became the compositor. He once encountered an opportunity to work as a screenwriter. Abhay Chajjlani, owner of Naiduniya Corp., asked Patoaui to write an article on Indian wrestling. He was very fond of wrestling and so stepped up to write on the subject. This article eventually led to the formation of Bhartiya Kushti Patrika. When the magazine started, the managing committee of the Naid Dniya newspaper got angry and Patoaui had to resign. As of 2012, the magazine had reached its 51st year of continuous publication, now as a monthly.

In the 1980s, the Bhartiya Kushti magazine published articles supportive of wrestlers using a vegetarian diet to build a strong physique.

In 2009, American Fehl M. Cannon having searched a lot about the Indian wrestling or Pehlwani on the Internet, learned of Bhartiya Kushti Patrika and contacted them through their Indian representative, Ms. Jyotika Bhambri. He preserved the archive through various modern techniques. At 81, Patodi is still publishing. He intends to continue at least until reaching 100.

== Bharat Ke Akhadey Va Pahlwan Edition ==
Bharat Ke Akhadey Va Pahlwan compiles wrestling data including famous bouts, events, coaches, etc. The Great Gama, Imam,हिन्द केसरी मंगला राय, Ramju, Chandgiram, Mehardeen, Ganpat came, then, Mahabali Satpal, Kartar, Suresh, Sushil Kumar, Narsingh and Rajeev are all covered.

== Achievements and awards ==
- Guru Hanuman Award.
- First Chandgi Ram Media award.
- In 2009, Fehl M. Cannon studied Indian wrestling on the Internet and created a partnership with "Bhartiya Kushti".
