= Gulab Bai =

Actor

- Born: 1926; Balpurva, Kannauj district, Uttar Pradesh, India
- Died: 1996 (aged 69–70)
- Other name: Gulab jaan
- Occupations: Stage performer Folk musician
- Known for: Nautanki
- Awards: Padma Shri

Gulab Bai (1926–1996), popularly known as Gulab jaan, was an Indian stage performer of Nautanki, the first female artist of the traditional operatic drama and considered by many as its pre-eminent exponent. She was the founder of the Great Gulab Theatre Company, a successful Nautanki troupe. The Government of India awarded her the fourth highest civilian award of Padma Shri in 1990.

== Biography ==
Gulab Bai was born in 1926 in Balpurva, in Farrukhabad district of the Indian state of Uttar Pradesh in Bedia caste, a backward community of entertainment performers. She started formal training in singing under Ustad Trimohan Lal of the Kanpur gharana and Ustad Mohammad Khan of the Hathras gharana in 1931 and began performing in public by joining Trimohan Lal's Nautanki troupe at the age of thirteen, becoming the first female performer of the art form. Soon, she developed an individual style of singing which earned her the moniker, Guba jaan.

Her rising popularity helped her to establish a Nautanki troupe of her own, the Great Gulab Theatre Company, against the wishes of Trimohan Lal. The company was said to be an instant success. The responsibility of the management of the company and her growing age forced her to curb her own performances by the 1960s and she groomed her little sister, Sukhbadan, later day Nanda Guha, as the leading performer, who over the years became a noted performer in her own right. Her daughter, Madhu, is also a known performer. Towards the latter part of her career, Nautanki's appeal, as an art form, gradually waned.

The Government of India honoured her with the civilian award of the Padma Shri in 1990. Six years later, she died, at the age of 70. Her life has been documented in a biography by Deepti Priya Mehrotra, under the name, Gulab Bai: The Queen of Nautanki Theatre; the book was published by Penguin India. Her life story was also the theme of a play, enacted on stage in May 2014 at Kanpur.

== See also ==
- Nautanki
