= Ramdayal Sharma =

Indian Nautanki artist

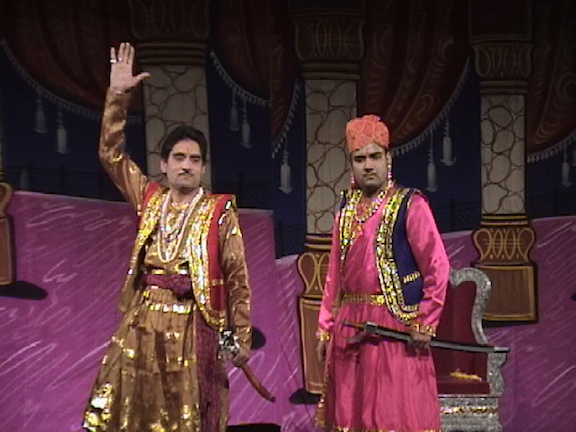
- Pandit Ram Dayal Sharma (left) and Dr. Devendra Sharma
- Born: Deeg, Bharatpur district, Rajasthan, India
- Occupations: Nautanki artist, singer, composer, teacher
- Known for: Revival and promotion of Nautanki folk theatre

Ramdayal Sharma is an Indian Nautanki artist. He is also a singer, composer and teacher. In 2022, he was awarded Padma Shri, and in 2015, the Sangeet Natak Akademi Award by the Indian Government for his contribution in Arts.

== Early life and education ==
Sharma is from Samai Kheda village of Deeg in Bharatpur district. He passed his 10th education from Deeg in 1964. In 1973, he moved to Delhi.

== Career ==
In 2003, Sharma was invited by The Indira Gandhi National Center for Arts (IGNCA) to perform at the International Symposium on Mudras. In 2004 and 2005, the India Government nominated him to the Expert committee to advise the Military of Defense on school children for Republic day parade. In 2012, he was the teacher of Nautanki in National School of Drama. He also wrote many original Nautankis such as "Sundar Katha" based on Sundar Kand of Ramcharitmanas, and "Beti Ka Byah" on the problem of dowry. He adapted "Hanuman Ki Ramayan" a Pauranic story into Nautanki. He has done untiring efforts to take our traditional culture to youngsters and students of today's generation. He has also performed at Theatre Royal London, Tara Arts UK and at many more places.

== Awards ==
- Padma Shri in 2022
