= Roshanara Begum =

- Shahzadi of the Mughal Empire
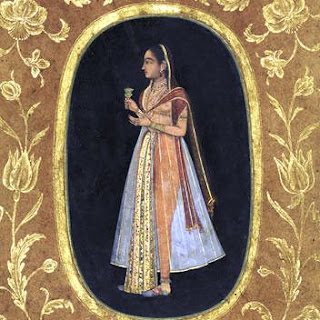
- Portrait of a princess, most likely Princess Roshanara Begum

Padshah Begum
- Tenure: 1658–1668
- Predecessor: Jahanara Begum
- Successor: Jahanara Begum
- Born: 3 September 1617; Burhanpur, India
- Died: 11 September 1671 (aged 54); Delhi, India
- Burial: Roshanara Bagh, Delhi
- House: Timurid
- Father: Shah Jahan
- Mother: Mumtaz Mahal
- Religion: Sunni Islam

Roshanara Begum (Persian: روشن آرا بیگم, lit. 'Adorned in Light'); 3 September 1617 – 11 September 1671) was a Mughal princess and poet. She was the third daughter of Emperor Shah Jahan and his wife, Mumtaz Mahal, and supported her younger brother Aurangzeb during the war of succession which took place after Shah Jahan's illness in 1657. After Aurangzeb's accession to the throne in 1658, Roshanara was given the title of Padshah Begum by her brother displacing her sister and rival Jahanara Begum. This made her the de-facto First Lady of the Mughal Empire, and a powerful political figure. However, after the death of Shah Jahan, Jahanara succeeded in regaining her title of Padshah Begum, by replacing Roshanara. Towards the end of her life, Roshanara was sidelined in Aurangzeb’s court.

Today, however, Roshanara is best known for the Roshanara Bagh, a pleasure garden located in present-day north Delhi. The present-day Roshanara Club which was constructed in the late 19th century by the British is a country club that was actually originally a part of the Roshanara Bagh.

== Family ==
Of Roshanara's four brothers, the eldest, Dara Shikoh, was Shah Jahan's favourite son and heir apparent to the Peacock Throne. Shah Shuja, the second son, was the rebellious Governor of Bengal, with open designs on his father's throne. Aurangzeb, the third son, was the nominal Governor of Deccan. Murad, the youngest son, was granted the Governorship of Gujarat, at which position he proved so weak and so ineffectual that Shah Jahan had him stripped of his titles, offering them to Dara Shikoh, instead. This precipitated a family struggle between Shah Jahan and his embittered younger sons, who resolved to depose the aging emperor and seize the throne for themselves. During this power struggle, Dara Shikoh received the support of his oldest sister, Jahanara Begum, while Roshanara Begum sided with Aurangzeb.

== Rise to power ==
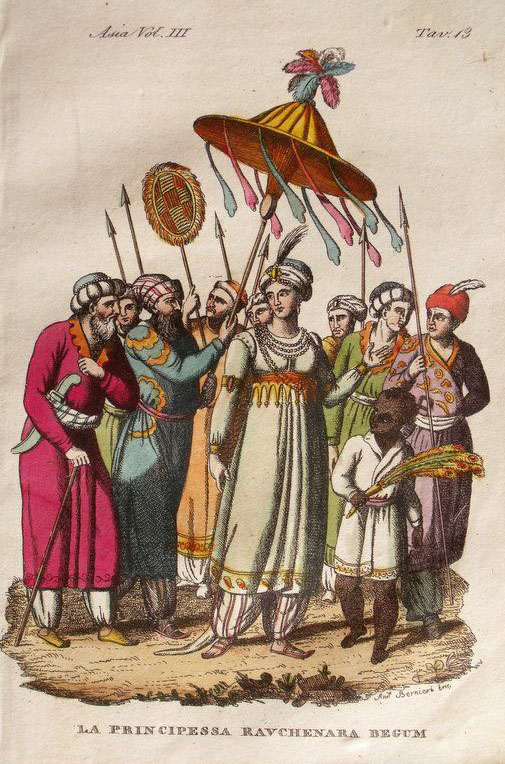
Imagined depiction of Roshanara Begum

Roshanara's rise to power began when she successfully foiled a plot by her father and Dara Shikoh to kill Aurangzeb. Shah Jahan sent a falsely peaceful missive while planning to kill Aurangzeb, as he viewed his third son as a threat. Roshanara heard of her father's plot and she sent a messenger to Aurangzeb, outlining their father's true intentions.

Aurangazeb was extremely grateful to Roshanara for her timely warning. When the war of succession was resolved in favor of Aurangzeb, she quickly became a very powerful and effective figure in the court. Fearing that Dara Shikoh would kill her for her role in the war of succession if he ever returned to power, Roshanara insisted that Aurangzeb orders Dara's execution. Legend has it that Dara was bound in chains, paraded around Chandni Chowk, and beheaded. Roshanara then had his bloody head wrapped in a golden turban, packaged neatly and sent to her father as a gift from Aurangzeb and her. Shah Jahan, who opened the package just as he was sitting down to dinner, was so distressed by the sight of his favorite son's head that he fell unconscious to the floor. He remained in a stupor for many days after the incident.

Roshanara's relationship with her older sister, Jahanara, was troubled and tinged by jealousy, as the latter was undisputedly their father's favorite daughter. Roshanara scored a major victory against her sister when Aurangzeb, who had been displeased with Jahanara for supporting their father and brother during the war of succession, removed her (Jahanara) from her position as Padshah Begum and head of the Imperial harem, installing Roshanara, instead. From then on, Roshanara was regarded as the most powerful and superior woman in the empire. She was also granted the right to issue nishans. This exceptional privilege was allowed only to those who held a high rank in the imperial harem. She was appointed as a Mansabdar, a high-ranking position in the Emperor's army that was used to enforce his rule and maintain his authority, especially during his absence.

Eventually, Roshanara and Aurangzeb fell out with each other. Roshanara was rumored to have taken on lovers, which was not viewed well by Aurangzeb. Additionally, she ruled Aurangzeb's palace with an iron hand and with such flexibility and with the same will that she used in the war of succession and earned the hatred of all the wives of her brother. She also advised him on matters of state and accompanied him to important meetings and on several occasions spoke from behind her curtained sitting place. She even patronized the building of the jama masjid (congregational mosque).

In 1662, during Aurangzeb's sudden and severe illness, Roshanara Begum took charge of him and would not allow anyone except her confidants, to see him. Believing that there was no hope of her brother's survival, Roshanara took charge of the state. She even stole Aurangzeb's signet ring and forged a decree to deny his eldest son by his wife Nawab Bai any chance of succession. When Nawab Bai learned of this and complained, Roshanara became angry, seized her by the hair, and dragged her out of Aurangzeb's chamber. After Aurangzeb's recovery, she claimed that wanted to prevent conspiracies and wars of succession so that chaos would not arise during his illness. She also had a love for gold and land, and accumulated wealth on a large scale, often by corrupt methods. This resulted in numerous complaints against her, none of which were brought to justice due to her position in the court. In addition, she blatantly misused the sweeping powers and privileges that Aurangzeb had granted her just before leaving for his long military campaign in the Deccan, to further her financial ends.

Finally, in 1667/8, the period of Roshanara as the de facto co-ruler of the empire ended. Her enemies soon brought these acts of financial and moral turpitude to Aurangzeb's notice. Himself a very strict Muslim, Aurangzeb frowned on Roshanara's libertine lifestyle and her greedy nature. On his return to Delhi, he stripped Roshanara of her powers, banished her from his court, and ordered her to remain in seclusion and live a pious life in her garden palace, outside of Delhi.

== Death ==
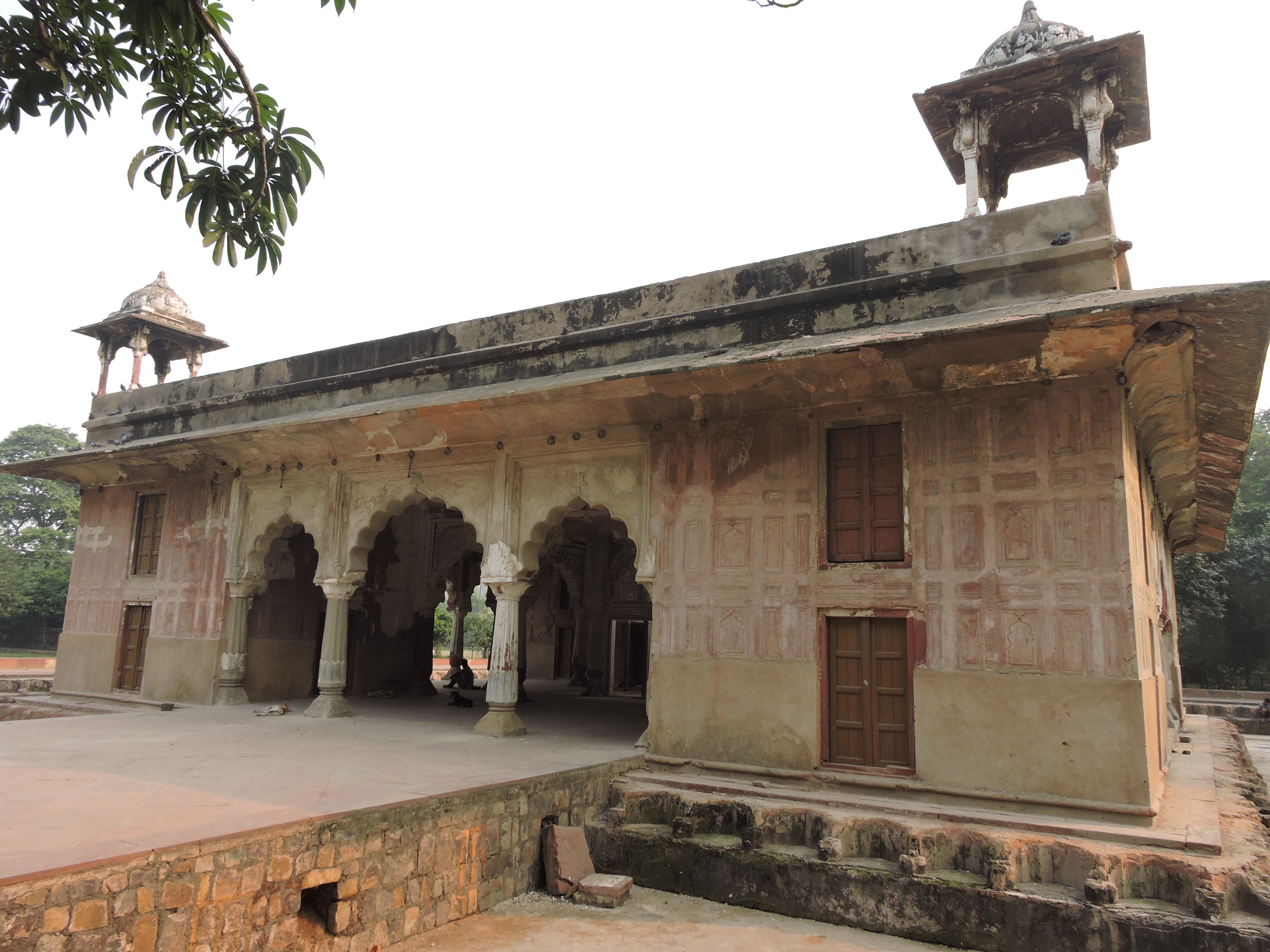
Tomb of Roshanara Begum, Delhi

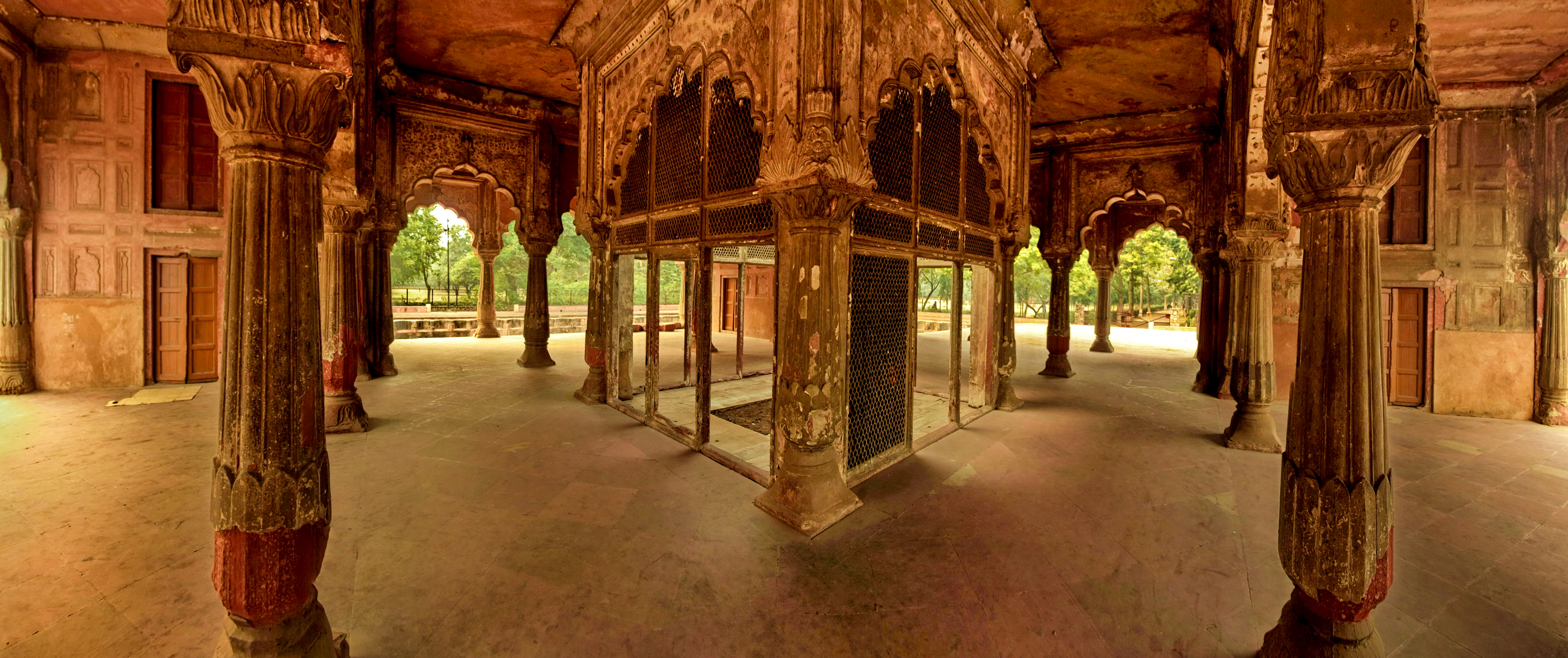
Tomb of Roshanara in her baradhari in Phulbangash, north Delhi

Even when Aurangzeb’s rule was established, Roshanara was afraid of the comeuppance of her actions, and thus asked Aurangzeb to build a palace for her away from the walled city. She decided to stay away from politics, which was getting dangerous and uncertain. Roshanara chose to spend an esoteric life in her palace in Delhi, surrounded by a thick forest. She never married and lived in her palace till the end of her life. Her palace in the middle of the Roshanara garden is a reminder of the crucial role she played in the history of India. She died at the age of 54. Aurangzeb had her interred in the Roshanara Bagh, a garden that she had designed and commissioned herself.

== Ancestry ==
Ancestors of Roshanara Begum

8. Jalal-ud-din Muhammad Akbar, Mughal Emperor
4. Nur-ud-din Muhammad Jahangir, Mughal Emperor
9. Mariam-uz-Zamani
2. Shahab-ud-din Muhammad Shah Jahan I, Mughal Emperor
10. Udai Singh, Raja of Marwar
5. Jagat Gosain
11. Manrang Devi of Gwalior
1. Roshanara Begum
12. I'timad-ud-Daulah
6. Abu'l-Hasan Asaf Khan
13. Asmat Begam
3. Mumtaz Mahal
14. Ghias ud-din ‘Ali Asaf Khan
7. Diwanji Begum

== Gallery ==
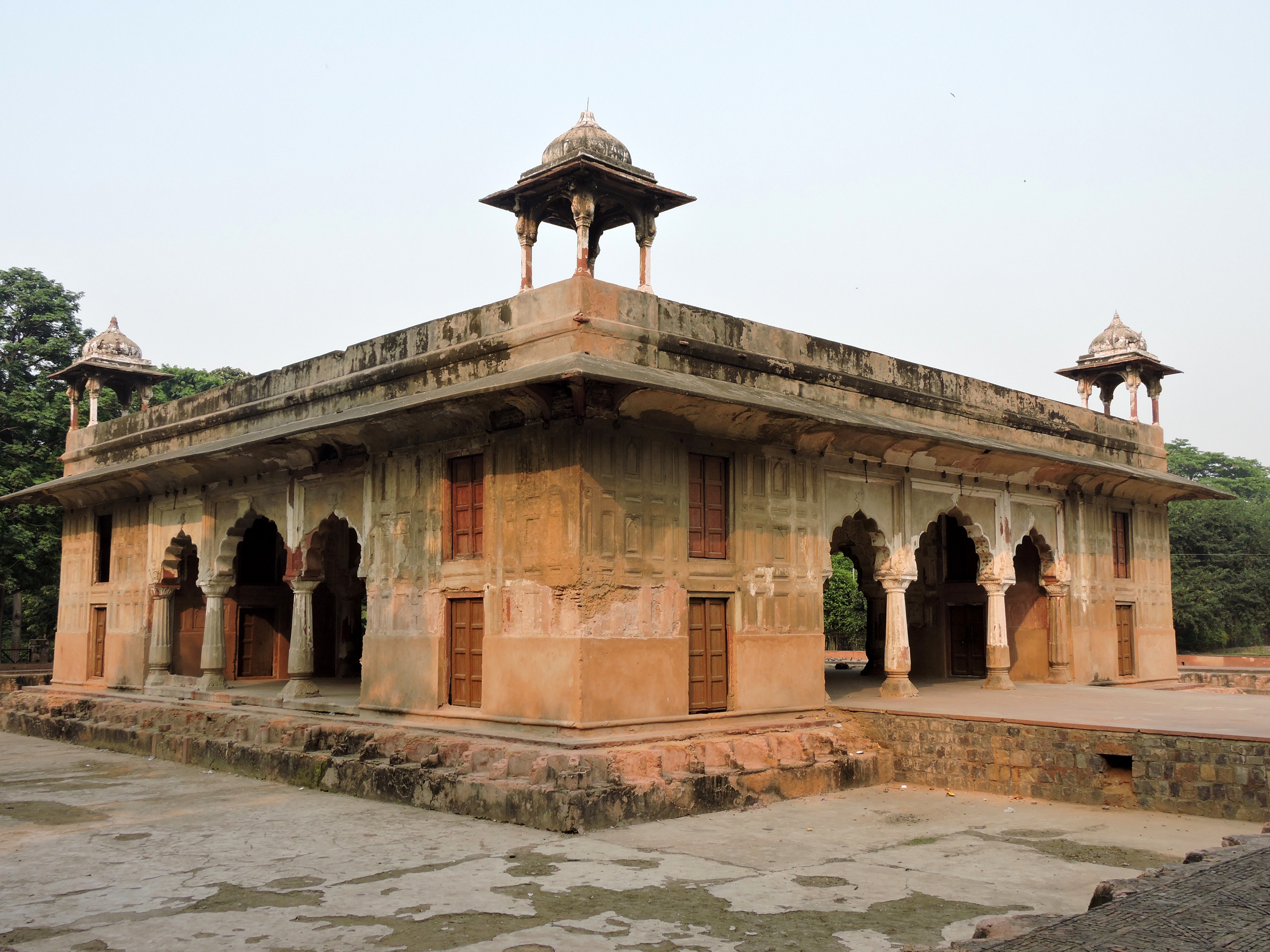
Front and left side view of tomb of Roshanara Begum

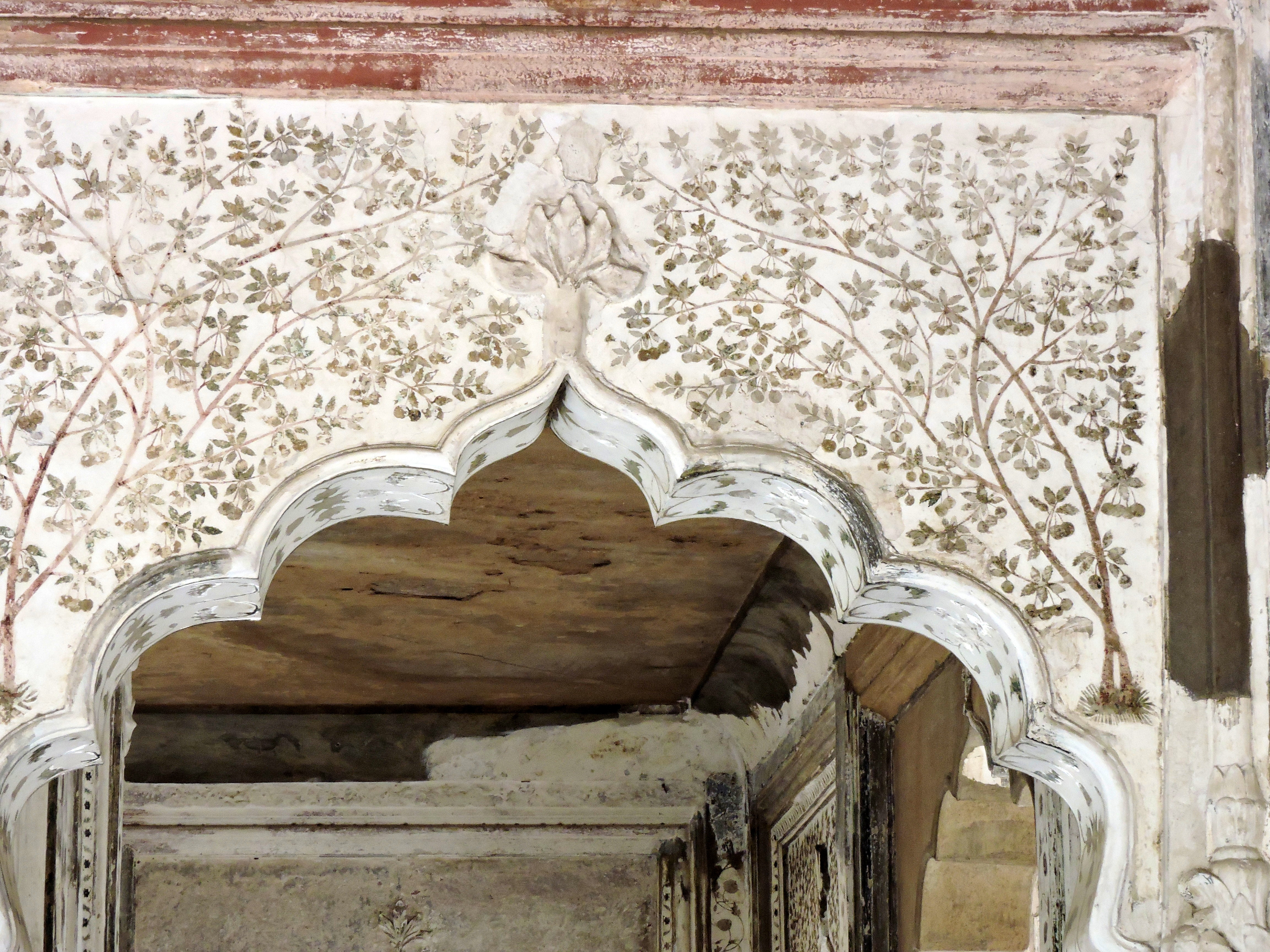
Interior decoration

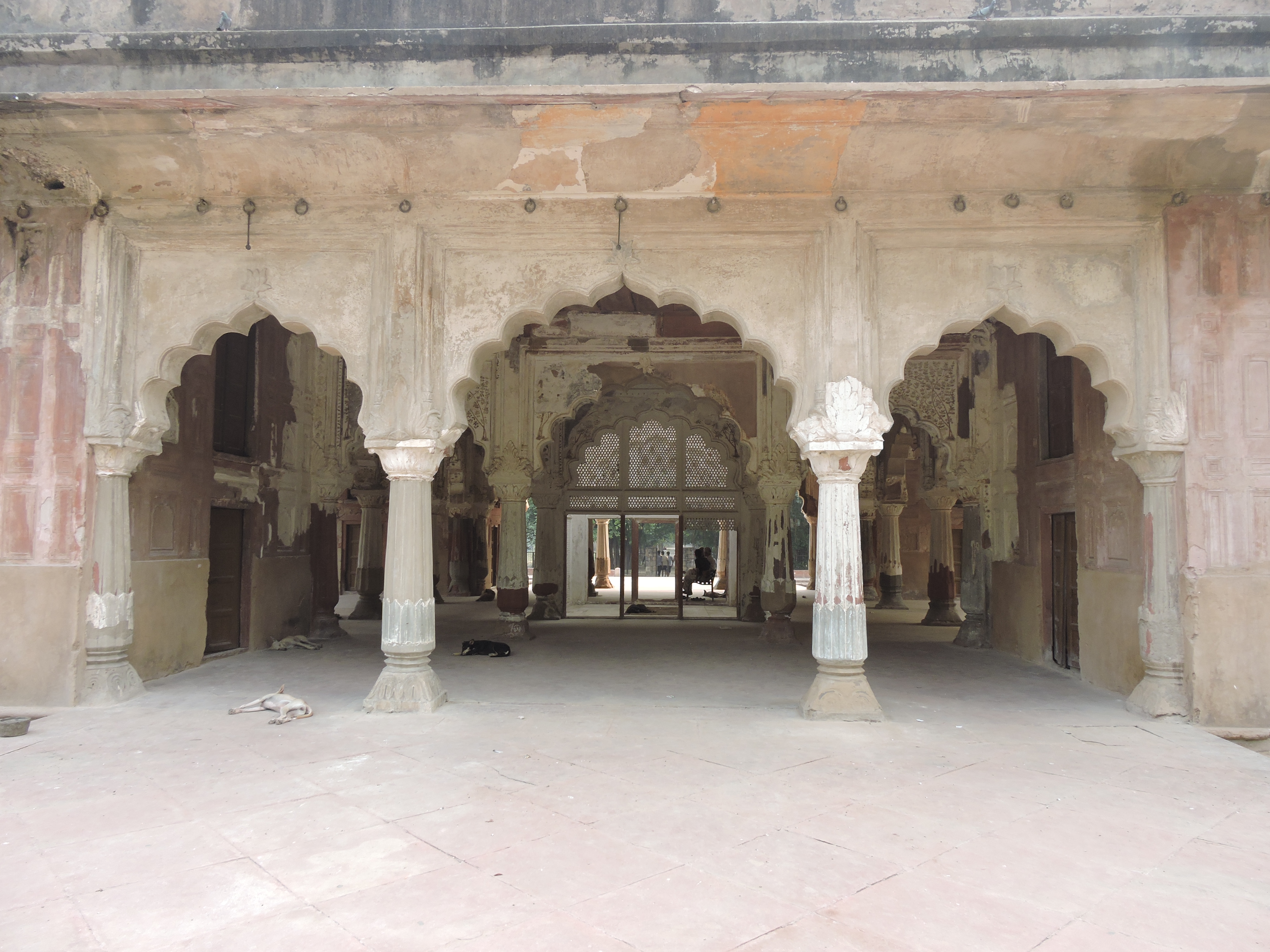
A view of tomb of Roshanara Begum

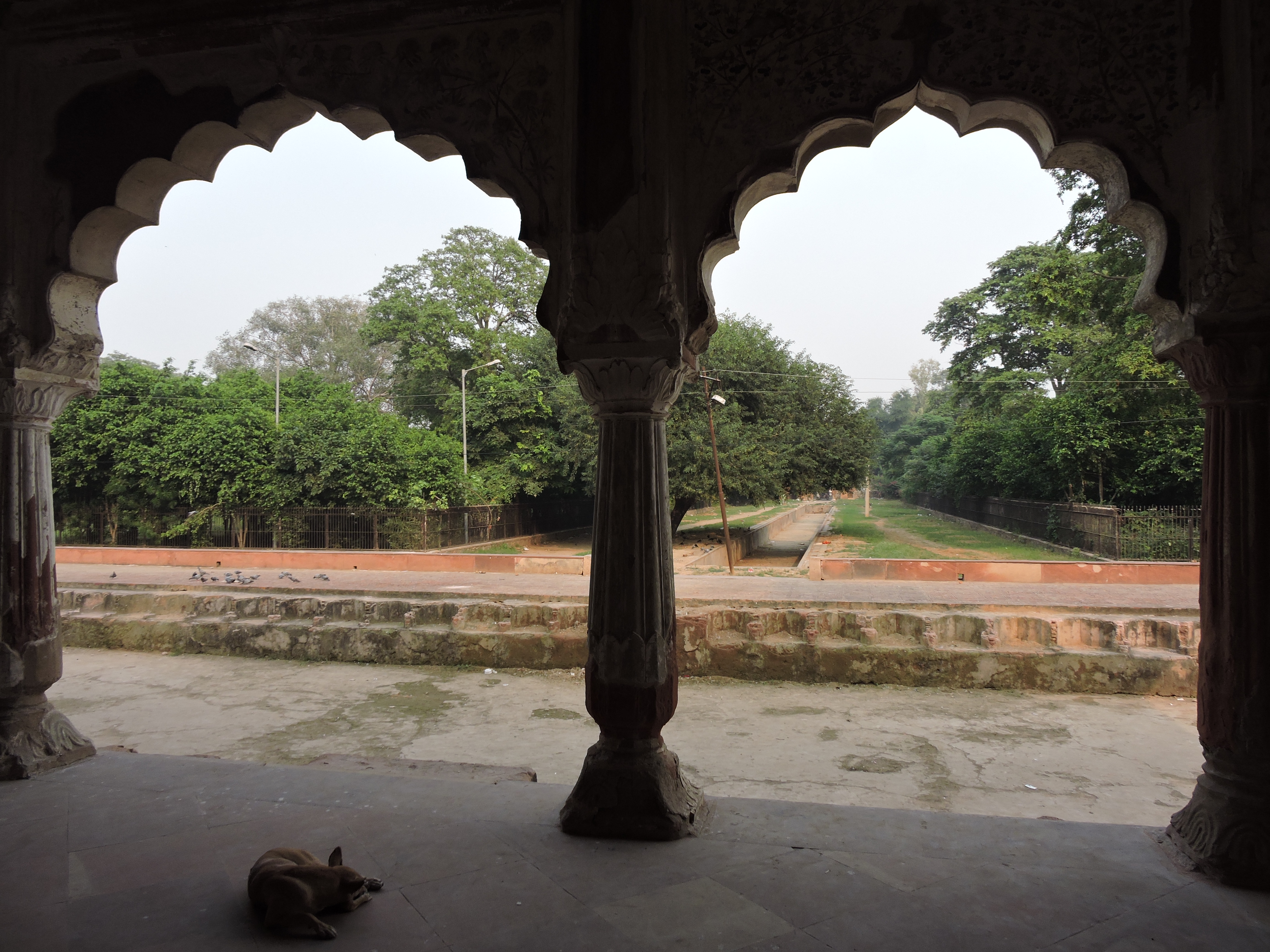
A view of Roshanara Garden through tomb of Roshanara Begum
