= Guru Radha Kishan =

Indian Independence activist (1925–1996)

Guru Radha Kishan beed

Opposition Leader, Municipal Corporation of Delhi
- Constituency: Delhi Sadar

Personal details
- Born: 1925 Beed village Harda District
- Died: 1996 (aged 70–71) New Delhi
- Party: Communist Party of India
- Spouse: Sunita Sharma Guru
- Children: Sameer sharma
- Relatives: Guru shivprasad Sharma beed, guruji shreekishan sharma beed (brothers)

Guru Radha Kishan (1925–1996) was an Indian Independence activist and Communist politician.

== Early life ==
Radha Kishan was born in 1925 in a family of farmers on Krishna Janmashtami in Bid village (currently in Harda district, Madhya Pradesh).

Radha Kishan first saw Mahatma Gandhi in December 1933 when Gandhi visited Harda. It was his passion for studies that he got himself enrolled for studies in a school at Cheepawad near Khirkiya, which was miles away from his native village. Though he had to experience the hardships of the life very early in his life as his father died while he was a child, but his love for his nation drive him for what he did in his life to come.

In the school he read a book authored by Vladimir Ilyich Lenin on the revolutionary struggle of Russia and an article about Indian Independence movement activists Pandit Ram Prasad Bismil, Sukhdev Thapar, Bhagat Singh and Chandra Shekhar Azad. Influenced by the martyrdom of the revolutionaries he left his studies to join the Independence struggle of India after hoisting the tricolour Independence flag in his school and for his this act he was sent to a reformatory school by the British colonial authorities. This was the beginning of his revolutionary career which inspired him to leave his native place with the intentions to do something for his country as said by Mahatma Gandhi in his speech at Harda.

== Early career ==
Social reformist, philosopher and member of Constituent Assembly of India, Shankar Trimbak Dharmadhikari popularly known as Dada Dharmadhikari was first major personality to notice Kishan's patriotism and dedication for the Independence movement. Dada sent a patriotic message to Kishan when he learned of the courage shown by him during a protest rally against colonial government.

Independence movement had acquired momentum in Madhya Bharat when this young firebrand activist Radha Kishan publicly challenged a British Police official and slapped him in front of a large gathering while the officer started abusing the activists at an Independence movement rally in Indore. Guru Radha Kishan was imprisoned in the notorious Mahidpur jail where he was in solitary confinement in terrible conditions. He always protested against insane British laws.

As one of the youngest activist from Madhya Pradesh he spent months in prison after being under grounded for more than two years. His colleagues includes Homi F Dazi, former MP from Indore and General Secretary of All India Trade Union Congress, Independence activists Ram Chandra Sarvate, Prof. Mahesh Dutt Mishr, Member of Constituent Assembly of India Vinayak Sarvate, Vinayakrao Sahasrabudhe, Sarjoo Pandey, eminent painter N S Bendre, Anant Laagu and award-winning writer from Malwa region Shivnarain Shrivastava, author of ek sair gehun. The social movement started by these activists against British government got easy sustenance and firm roots between the masses of Indore and Madhya Bharat as issues of economic and social deprivation were also highlighted by them.

== Narmada Ke Sacche Sapoot ==
In an address Governor of Madhya Pradesh, Mohammad Shafi Qureshi stated: "Freedom fighter and social worker of unconditional integrity Guruji is a noble soul with a pious heart. People like him are extremely rare in the society today, it's an honour to facilitate such a selfless individual."

Despite political differences, former president of BJP Kushabhau Thakre praised Guru Radha Kishan as Narmada ke Sacche Sapoot mentioning his selfless social work and dedication for the underprivileged class. Thakre also known for his simple lifestyle in political circles once stated about Guru Ji that he was a Gandhian in politics with no ambitions for himself or his family at all.

Prior to this, on many occasions Madhya Pradesh Chief Minister and senior Congressman Prakash Chandra Sethi requested him to accept the Freedom Fighter Pension, which he humbly but strongly denied. He was entirely not interested to accept any pension for his participation in the Independence struggle of India. This sets him apart from many other Independence activists who held high offices in independent India is his complete insulation from material desire. He refused to accept any pension and never applied for the same till it was declared as Sammaan Nidhi by the government. Only after being declared as Samman Nidhi he accepted the recognition from the government for being an Independence activist even when he had no source of income and would not accept any favours from any well wisher.

== Mass Organisations and Communist Party ==
After India gained independence Kishan undertook a twenty-four-day fast to promote the cause of textile workers in Delhi prior to becoming the youngest member of Delhi Municipal Committee. The first elected mayor of Delhi and noted Independence activist Bharat Ratna Aruna Asaf Ali was so impressed by his simplicity and selflessness that she started calling him Guru Bhai.

Before Independence he was involved in mobilising youth and organising trade union activities in textile mills and unorganised sectors at various locations for All India Trade Union Congress primarily in Indore, Kota and Gwalior to name a few. This was continued in Delhi during 1948-50 where he worked prominently to unite the workers in textile, municipal and unorganised sectors when there was a crackdown on communists nationwide.

In fact the idea of uniting unskilled labour of unorganised sector and his exceptional organising capabilities made him so popular in political and social circles that workers and colleagues started calling him Guruji. He was arrested many times for social causes, for leading under privileged class, textile employees, during general strikes and even for a strike of Delhi Police. He worked with prominent communists and social activists of that era like Aruna Asaf Ali, Mukimuddin Farooqui, Devdutt Atal, H L Parwana, Nuruddin Ahmed, Yagya Dutt Sharma, Vimla (Kapoor) Farooqui, Premsagar Gupta, Pandit Madan Mohan, Ram Chandra Sharma, N N Manna, Shaadi Lal, Janardan Sharma, B D Joshi, Shakeel Ahmad, Sarla Sharma and educationists like Prof. Nand Lal Gupta to erect and lead the communist movement in Delhi.

As first state president of the youth wing of Communist Party, Kishan encouraged young political and social activists and nurtured them to be in forefront throughout his life. When P K Vasudevan Nair and Balraj Sahani conveyed to him the idea of an All India Youth Federation he actively participated in organising the first national conference of AIYF in Delhi. About 250 delegates and observers representing several youth organizations of eleven states of India attended this six-day session and the event was a success. His efforts were visible when the presence of the organisation was noticed by E.M.S. Namboodiripad, Telangana Chandra Rajeswara Rao and other leaders. Balraj Sahani was named first President and Sarda Mitra was elected as general secretary of AIYF.

== Social and Public Representation ==
As an opposition stalwart and leader of the CPI, Guru Radha Kishan's speeches in the Municipal Corporation of Delhi were marked with positive criticism and earned him the admiration of even his political opponents. Never enamoured of office, he was severely blunt about government's failures and raised many an eyebrow among the benches with his frank observations and constructive reasoning.

Kishan was close to the masses and a known champion of the causes of underprivileged people while serving as Municipal Councillor of Delhi. He also served as member of various administrative committees for state and central government with equal distinction. That was the impact of Guruji between the masses of his area that even in 1977, when the Janta Party dominated the polls almost everywhere, he won the civic body elections from his constituency. Being the senior most in the house, he presided over the house as pro tem Mayor of Delhi.

Kishan represented India in Germany leading a delegation to Düsseldorf. He discussed about the welfare plans for working class in Germany and briefed about Indian Civic System to his counterparts from other countries. Returning from Europe he enforced Delhi administration and MCD officials to adapt many of those welfare schemes for a better life of working class in Delhi. People from all walks of life come out to support Guru Radha Kishan when Communist Party of India announced his candidature from Delhi Sadar Parliamentary Constituency in 1977, the same year he successfully contested the civic body polls also.

He was the firm believer of the fact that only the education can bring the changes in the underprivileged people of the society, he took the initiative to bring the first Janta Library in his constituency which was inaugurated by Sh. Balraj Sahni, an eminent film personality in the presence of the writers Amrita Pritam, Bhishm Sahani, Santosh Anand, painter Narayan Shridhar Bendre and social activist Aruna Asaf Ali. Guru Ji's firm belief that education is a must for progress in the life has paved the way for a social centre at Guru Radha Kishan Smarak Bhavan, Clock Tower in Delhi, where his family still resides.

== Independent and Secular India ==
Radha Kishan worked for communal harmony during his six-decade-long political life; when violence in Delhi was triggered by the assassination of Indira Gandhi on 31 October 1984 by two of her Sikh bodyguards, Guru Radha Kishan came out on the streets of Delhi to save innocent Sikhs in the worst-affected regions of Delhi. He worked to protect Sikh families even when his office caught fire in Delhi during that period. Guruji along with other persons from the civil society came forward to provide immediate relief for the suffering Sikh community.

Kishan was a public speaker who analyzed social issues, secularism, political extremism and communist ideology through his life. He publicly opposed communalism and expressed concern over the influence of communal factions within the state. He was opposed to terrorism and separatist movements. Additionally, he was an early critic of extremism in Punjab, supporting the counter-extremism efforts by his colleague, Punjab MLA Darshan Singh Canadian.

Guru Radha Kishan severely criticised HKL Bhagat and MP from Karol Bagh Dharam Das Shastri for their alleged role in anti-Sikh riots even when they were very closely associated with him personally. Till he passes away he strongly believed and condemned 1984 anti-Sikh riots along with 1947 Partition riots and Babri Masjid demolition. Ideally, according to him they were the worst incidents in independent India and any such incidents should not have happened at any cost.

== Recognition ==
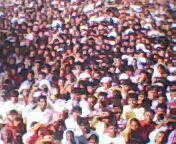
Mourners deliver a final tribute to Guru Radha Kishan

Addressing a large gathering at Ghantaghar Chowk in Delhi after his death on January 10, 1996 Madan Lal Khurana, Delhi Chief Minister said "No house of his own to live, no money, simple lifestyle and total commitment for public life to serve selflessly the people, specially poor and deprived class makes Guru Radha Kishan a perfect example to follow in public life and politics. "Kisi se koi man-bhaid nahin chhahe kitne bhi raajnaitik mat-bhaid hon. Guruji was a constant source of support for all progressive people of Delhi, a true saint in the politics."

The Leader of Opposition of Delhi Assembly Jagpravesh Chandra said "If you ask me to name any other politician like him in Delhi its extremely difficult for me because Guru Radha Kishan was a gandhian in approach and a true communist in his ideas. He was a man of masses, a role model for integrity and honesty in public life." Former Union Minister and Delhi Sadar MP Jagdish Tytler added " Guruji never asked for any personal favour from anyone ever, he will keep guiding us as he will survive in our hearts forever."

Home Minister of India Indrajit Gupta, also present at his funeral ceremony called this as severely painful personal loss. He further added that it was a great loss for the underprivileged class and communist movement as a whole and for the members of All India Trade Union Congress in Delhi specially. Communist historian Anand Gupta wrote in a special mention about him "Guruji was always so involved with the people that often he had no time for the basic requirements of his own life." In short, he was always available for the general public and the underprivileged class of the society.

M Farooqui, Sudhakar Reddy MP, Abani Roy, Politburo Member CPM and MP S. Ramachandran Pillai, National Secretary CPI and MP J Chittranjan, President of Delhi State Congress and Member of Congress National Working Committee Deep Chand Bandhu, Film actor-wrestler and MP Dara Singh, Journalist Prabhash Joshi and E Srinivasan, Secretary Government of India were also present to give the final salute to this Swatantrata Sangram Sainik.

National Minorities Commission Member Harcharan Singh Josh remembered him as a man of principles and impeccable integrity with a pious soul, he added "Guruji always condemned any discrimination based on the religion or caste and worked for substantial improvements in the position of underprivileged people." Prominent Communist Prem Sagar Gupta said that "Guru was a man of masses and loved to be with them. Though not much has been said about him despite his exceptional service to the nation pertaining to his period, his dedication for red flag and communist movement, passion for social work and organisational capabilities will be remembered for a long time by communist cadre and masses."

Loksabha Speaker PM Sayeed, Aruna Asaf Ali, Com. P K Vasudevan Nair, Com. Homi F Dazi, NFIW leader Vimla Farooqui, Union Minister Chaturanan Mishra, Madhya Pradesh Chief Minister Digvijay Singh, Independence activists Chaudhary Ranbir Singh Hooda, Sheelbhadra Yazee, Sarla Sharma, BD Joshi, Mohammad Shafi Qureshi, Chaudhary Prem Singh, Former Union Minister Rajesh Pilot, HKL Bhagat, Santosh Anand, Kedar Nath Sahani, Brijmohan Toofaan, Guru Hanuman, Purshottam Goyal and Viresh Pratap Chaudhary send their condolences to the family. Many social and religious leaders apart from other dignitaries from major political parties, social outfits and trade unions also attended the gathering to pay final tribute to him.

Kishan is generally well remembered among the Indian Population. This is partly due to his condemnation of discrimination, which deeply affected the majority impoverished population of India.

== Family ==
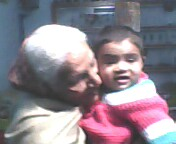

Guru Radha Kishan was ably supported by his wife Sunita Sharma throughout his life. His family was arrested so many times for social and political reasons but Sharma, herself a prominent NFIW activist even though came from a rich family of landowners neither regretted nor complained about this lifestyle and always supported him.

She held various positions in NFIW, in relief camps organised by NFIW for people affected by floods or the Shanti March after 1984 anti-Sikh riots.

She helped organise the first Shanti March in Delhi and ensured a participation by Sikhs families demanding immediate relief for Sikh community and severe prosecution for those responsible for the riots. Several human rights organizations along with the media applauded this humanitarian act of her and her comrades.

Like her husband she followed the path of simplicity and impeccable integrity and insisted that others follow the same course in public life. She suffered much she never abandoned with her principles. She neither demanded nor accepted favours from anyone throughout her life.

Born at Saharanpur on 2 March 1939 in a Zamindaar family, Sunita zealously started working for the underprivileged after her marriage and remained involved with NFIW and Communist movement until her death on 13 November 2012, coinciding with Deepawali that year. Amarjeet Kaur, Secretary CPI National Council, Senior Communist Ramsaran Ram, Prof. Dinesh Varshney and Dhirendra Sharma, Secretary Delhi Communist Party were among the people and Social activists gathered to pay her the last tributes.

His son Sameer Sharma Guru is an advocate of Social Justice. Sameer Guru, presently a member of Centre for Environment and Social Empowerment started his career with The Independent Media Group. His writings on Socio-Legal issues and work for Structural Stability of Buildings, Vrindavan Widows and Underprivileged Elders in the society talks about his personality.

== Legacy ==
English daily The Hindustan Times wrote in an article about him:

Despite being a prominent politician of Delhi he was always accessible to public, a man of masses loved by every class of the society. Guru Radha Kishan fought valiantly for the economic deprivation for the poor and the issues of social deprivation in Delhi. He was so selfless that he rides a bicycle, he has no house and bank balances to mention. Guru Radha Kishan never deviated from the decent self conduct throughout his public life and opted to live in a rented premises of one room and shunned many of the facilities he was entitled to. Being an honest representative of society he was widely respected for his integrity, honesty and transparency cutting across party lines. He was a true social worker and a person who deserves to be respected and loved. "Alas! he is a history."

== References and external links ==
- New Age, Mukti Sangharsh, Dilli ki communist party ka itihass :CPI Publications
- Scavenger in Indian Society, Rama Sharma :ISBN 8185880700
- http://www.indianfreedomfighters.in/guru-radha-kishan.htm
- Biography of Amrita Pritam :http://www.poemhunter.com/amrita-pritam/biography
- http://www.indianmirror.com/arts/celebrities/balraj-sahni.html
- Manoj Mitta and H.S. Phoolka, When a Tree Shook Delhi
- Chandra, Bipan & others (2000). India after Independence 1947–2000, New Delhi:Penguin, ISBN 0-14-027825-7
- Comrade Sunita Sharma Ka Nidhan... Mukti Sangharsh, 18–24 November 2012
- Hindustan Times
- Alas! He is a history :The Hindustan Times
- Archives from Nehru Memorial Museum and Library, New Delhi
