= Gołąb =

Gołąb (meaning "dove") may refer to:

- Gołąb (surname)
- Gołąb, Chełm County in Lublin Voivodeship (east Poland)
- Gołąb, Lubartów County in Lublin Voivodeship (east Poland)
- Gołąb, Puławy County in Lublin Voivodeship (east Poland)
- Battle of Gołąb, between Polish-Lithuanian Commonwealth and Swedish Empire

== See also ==
- Golomb
- Gołąbki
