= Roshanara Bagh =

Garden in Shakti Nagar, India

Roshanara Gardens
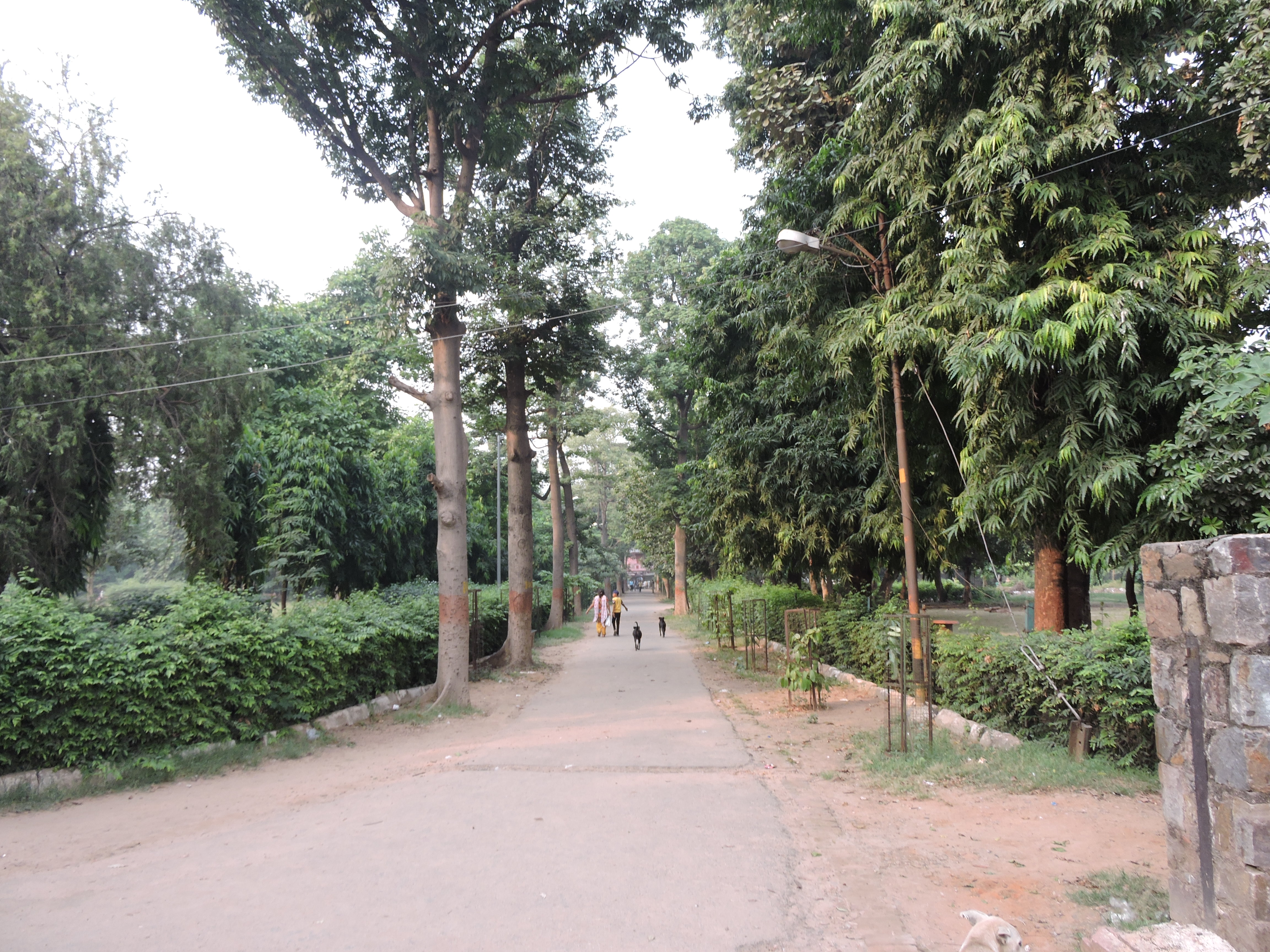
- A view of Roshanara Garden
- Interactive map of Roshanara Gardens
- Type: Mughal garden
- Location: Delhi, India
- Coordinates: 28°40′23″N 77°11′52″E
- Area: 57.29 acres (23.18 ha)
- Opened: 1650s
- Founder: Roshanara Begum
- Owner: North Delhi Municipal Corporation
- Operator: North Delhi Municipal Corporation

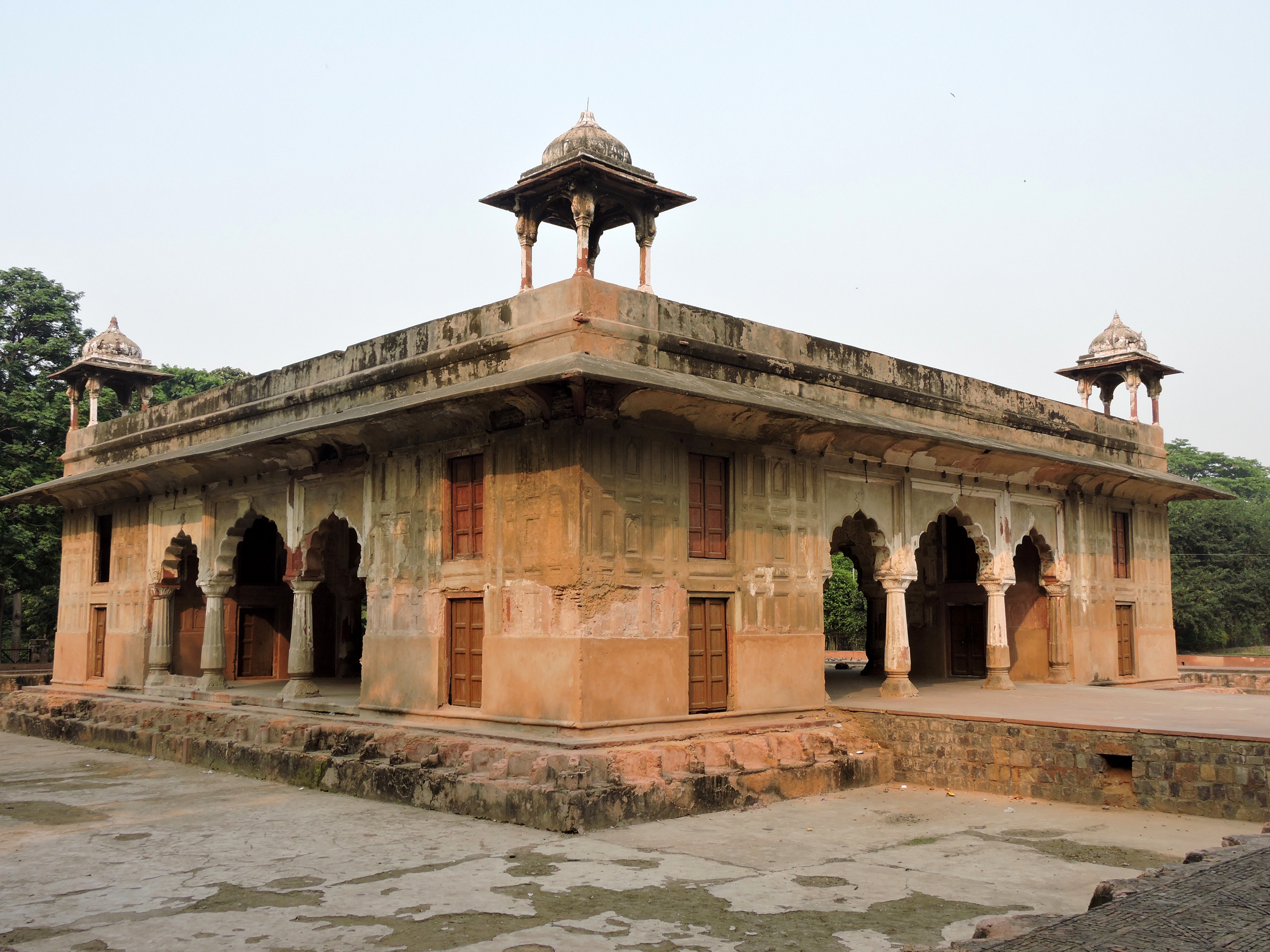
Front and left side view of tomb of Roshanara Begum

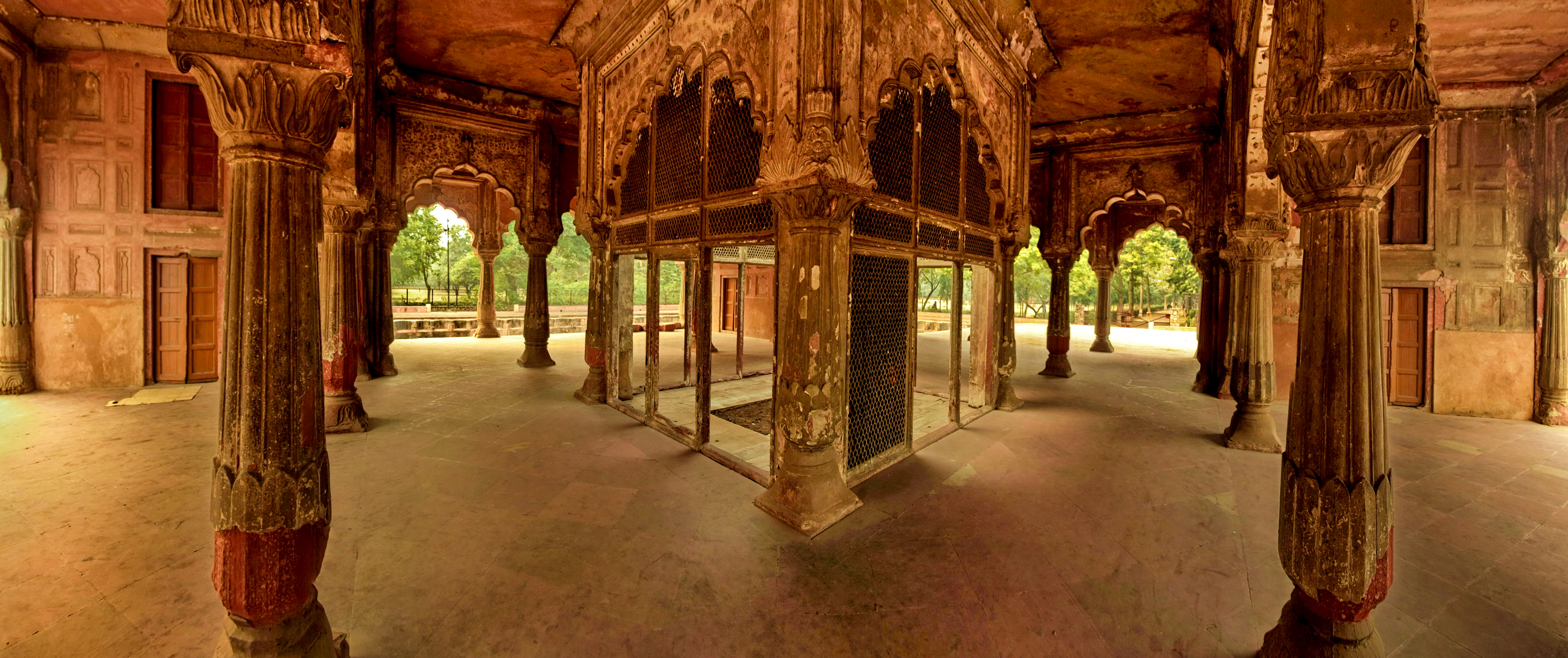
Grave of Roshanara inside the Baradari

Roshanara Garden is a Mughal-era garden built by Roshanara Begum, the second daughter of the Mughal emperor Shah Jahan. It is situated in Shakti Nagar near Kamla Nagar Clock Tower and North Campus of University of Delhi. It is one of the biggest gardens in Delhi having a great variety of plants, some imported from Japan. The lake inside the garden is visited by migratory birds during winters and is a popular site for bird watching.

The garden has a raised canal with flowering plants on both sides. Today the garden holds a white marble pavilion built in memory of princess Roshanara, who died in 1671 and was buried there.

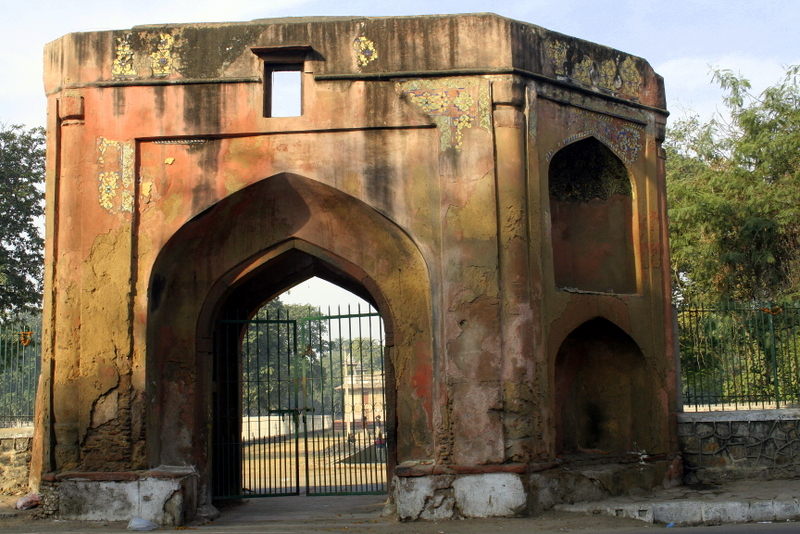
The Punjabi gate is some 200 m east of the tomb.

== History ==
The garden and the tomb within were constructed by Roshanara Begum beginning in 1650. Her tomb is the only structure that remains of the garden's original appearance.

This garden was the Gift of Roshanara Begam, daughter of the Mughal Emperor Shah Jahan.

Roshanara's rise to power began when she successfully foiled a plot by her father and Dara Shikoh to kill Aurangzeb. According to history, Shah Jahan sent a letter of invitation to Aurangzeb to come to Delhi, to peacefully resolve the family crisis. In truth, however, Shah Jahan planned to capture, imprison and kill Aurangzeb, as he viewed his third son as a serious threat to the throne. When Roshanara got wind of her father's plots, she sent a messenger to Aurangzeb, outlining their father's true intentions, and warning Aurangzeb to stay away from Delhi.After Aurangzed won the Mughal War of Succession he stripped his older sister and his father's favorite Jahanara Begum of the title of Padshah Begum as she supported his opponent Dara Shikoh . Roshanara, who constantly had Aurangzeb's back and was his trusted confidante and advisor was invested with the office of Padshah Begum

From then on, Roshanara was regarded as the most powerful and superior woman in the empire. She was also granted the right to issue nishans. This exceptional privilege was allowed only to those who held a high rank in the imperial harem. She was appointed as a Mansabdar, a high-ranking position in the Emperor's army that was used to enforce his rule and maintain his authority, especially during his absence.

In 1667/8, the period of Roshanara as the de facto co-ruler of the empire ended. Her enemies soon brought her acts of financial and moral turpitude to Aurangzeb's notice. Himself a very strict Muslim, Aurangzeb frowned on Roshanara's libertine lifestyle and her greedy nature. On his return to Delhi, he stripped Roshanara of her powers, banished her from his court. She then commissioned a country palace-garden to retire from politics and lead a pious and secluded life.

The elite Roshanara Club, which was started here in 1922 by the British and contracted by Sir Sobha Singh is spread over 22 acres. Since 1927 first class cricket is played at the Roshanara Club Ground, which now boasts floodlights. The club is considered the birthplace of the Board of Control for Cricket in India (BCCI). Post Independence cricket administrators gathered in front of an old fireplace and sowed the seeds of the Indian cricket body.

== Transport ==
It is serviced by the Pul Bangash metro station on the Red Line of Delhi Metro. It is situated close to National Highway 1 on the Grand Trunk Road.

== See also ==
- Lal Bangla in Delhi, mausoleum of Lal Kunwar, the mother of Shah Alam II (1759-1806), and his daughter Begum Jaan.
- Lal Darwaza, the northern gate of the outer walls of the Delhi of Sher Shah Suri. Also Known as Khooni Darwaza.
- List of parks in Delhi
