= Sanjay Nagar =

Sanjay Nagar Sanjay nagar Sanjay Koyala Nagar
- Govt. Society
- Location in Madhya Pradesh, India Sanjay Nagar (India)
- Coordinates: 23.11805°N 81.73865°E
- Country: India
- State: Madhya Pradesh
- District: Anuppur

Government
  - Body: South Eastern Coal Fields Limited
  - Rank: 01

Languages
  - Official: Hindi
- Time zone: UTC+5:30 (IST)
- PIN: 484120
- Telephone code: 07652
- ISO 3166 code: IN-MP
- Vehicle registration: MP
- Nearest city: Shahdol, Jabalpur

Sanjay Koyala Nagar is a South Eastern Coalfields Limited (SECL) Colony in Anuppur district of Madhya Pradesh India. The colony falls under the Deohara village Panchayat administration and is occupied by the Company employees.

The SECL has a number of colonies in the Shahdol and Anuppur districts. There is a motley of cultural, linguistic, and religious people living in harmony in this little colony. A number of schools such as the Government school, Saraswati school, and the Pine Mount English Medium High School are situated here.
