= Bhela Gulab Singh =

Coordinates: 30°43′0″N 74°4′0″E

Bheela Gulab Singh
- Town and union council
- Interactive map of Bheela Gulab Singh
- Country: Pakistan
- Province: Punjab
- District: Okara District
- Time zone: UTC+5 (PST)

Bheela Gulab Singh is a town and union council of Depalpur Tehsil in Okara District of Punjab Province, Pakistan. It is located at 30°43'0N 74°4'0E.
