= Subhash Verma =

Indian wrestler

Subash
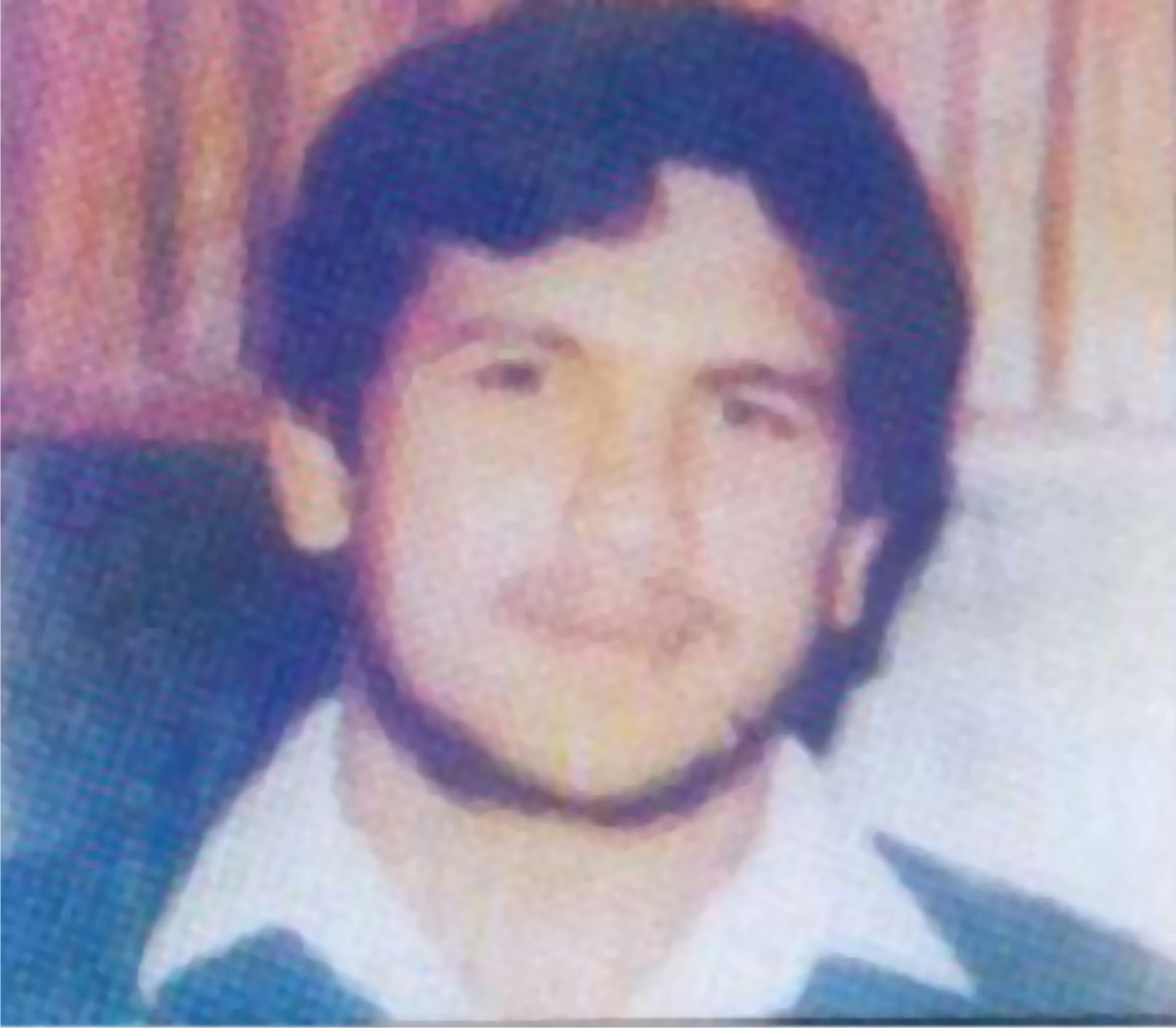

Personal information
- Nationality: Indian
- Born: 15 July 1968 (age 58) Village Malakpur, Baghpat district, Uttar Pradesh
- Height: 180 cm (5 ft 11 in)

Sport
- Country: India
- Sport: Wrestling
- Event: 100 kg freestyle
- Coached by: Guru Hanuman
Medal record
Representing India
Men's Freestyle Wrestling
Commonwealth Games
Bronze medal – third place	1994 Victoria	100 kg
Asian Championships
Gold medal – first place	1987 Bombay	100 kg
Silver medal – second place	1988 Islamabad	100 kg
Bronze medal – third place	1989 Ōarai	100 kg
Bronze medal – third place	1991 New Delhi	100 kg
Commonwealth Championship
Gold medal – first place	1989 Championships	100 kg
Gold medal – first place	1995 Championships	100 kg
Bronze medal – third place	1991 Championships	100 kg
- Updated on 19 November 2014

Subhash Verma is a retired Indian wrestler born on 15 July 1968 at village Malakpur, Baghpat, UP. Verma was trained at the Hanuman Akhara (wrestling school) of Delhi. He was a very famous pupil of Guru Hanuman. He had won Bharat Kesari (Very Popular Indian Style wrestling Tournament) title 15 times in his career. Now he runs his own Akhara to train young wrestler for India.
