= Gulabi Bagh =

- Neighborhood
- Location within Delhi Location within India
- Coordinates: 28°40′29.1″N 77°11′31.8″E
- Country: India
- State: Delhi
- District: North Delhi

Government
  - Body: Municipal Corporation of Delhi

Languages
  - Official: Hindi, English
- Time zone: UTC+5:30 (IST)
- PIN: 110007
- Telephone code: 011
- Member of Lok Sabha: Harsh Vardhan

Gulabi Bagh is one of the oldest and planned residential areas that lies north of central Delhi, India, adjacent to Ashok Vihar, Shakti Nagar, Kamla Nagar, Karol Bagh. Famous for its greenery and fresh air, it is often characterized by its famousmonkey park that is adjacent to it. Its PIN code is 110007.

Gulabi Bagh is divided in mainly three locations. Delhi Development Authority (DDA) Flats, Delhi Government Flats and Sanjay nagar.

Delhi Government flats is a well developed residential area and has Super Market, Central Park, Community Center, Multi-Purpose Gym, Old Age amusement center, Government Offices.

While sanjay nagar is an upscale residential colony housing facilities like NKS Super Specialty hospital.

Gulabi Bagh DDA flat's area is also known for number of green parks in colony and fresh air.

== Education ==
There are a couple of Primary and Senior Secondary Schools in Gulabi Bagh. Also Delhi university North Campus is situated nearby. Schools like Monfort or Presidium situated in neighbouring areas are too well within reach.

== Greenery ==
This area is famous for its green cover. There is an abundance of parks contributing in fresh air. Population density is also well below Capital's average.

Public parks include Central Park

In 2023, Shastri Park was chosen as a site for one of the several "skill development zones" planned by the Dehli Development Zone. Approximately two acres of the park will be redesigned and built to support physical fitness activities for adults and children.

== Public Transportation ==
Gulabi Bagh is connected via metro; Shastri nagar metro and Pratap Nagar metro Stations are easily accessible. Buses also offer public transportation to surrounding areas.

== Shopping ==
The colony itself has super markets to shop, still for more substantial shopping one can go to kamla nagar market or deep market which are just minutes away.

== Medical facilities ==
NKS Super Specialty hospital is situated in Sanjay Nagar colony of gulabi bagh. Also there are a couple of government dispensaries.

== Notable Events ==
In September 2024, a gold merchant was robbed of 4kg gold in Gulabi Bagh.
