= Nautanki =

Folk art

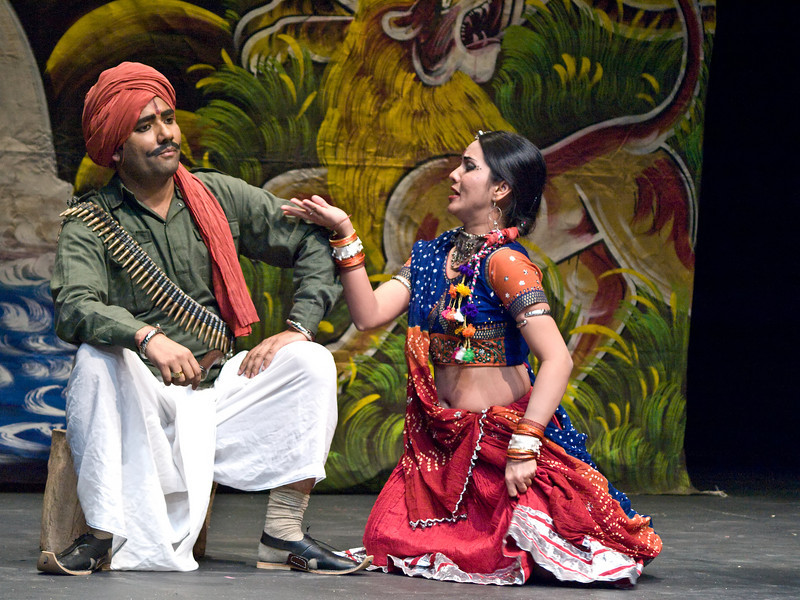
Dr. Devendra Sharma as Sultana Daku and Palak Joshi as Phoolkunwar in Sultana Daku

Nautanki is one of the most popular folk performance forms of the Indian subcontinent, particularly in northern India. Before the advent of Bollywood (the Hindi film industry), Nautanki was the biggest entertainment medium in the villages and towns of northern India. Nautanki's rich musical compositions and humorous, entertaining storylines hold a strong influence over rural people's imagination. Even after the spread of mass media (such as television, DVDs, and online streaming), a crowd of 10,000 to 15,000 can be seen at the top Nautanki performances. Nautanki's origins lie in the Saangit, Bhagat, and Swang musical theatre traditions of Northern India. One Saangit called Saangit Rani Nautanki Ka became so popular that the whole genre's name became Nautanki. Nautanki is most famous in the states of Uttar Pradesh, Rajasthan, Madhya Pradesh, Haryana, and Bihar.

== Performances ==
Nautanki performances are operas based on a popular folk theme derived from romantic tales, mythologies, or biographies of local heroes. The performance is often punctuated with individual songs, dances, and skits, which serve as breaks and comic relief for audiences. Audiences sometimes use the breaks to go to the toilet or pick up food from their homes or nearby shops. Nautanki performances involve a lot of community participation from audiences. For instance, community members provide logistical support, financial support, and talented actors for Nautanki performances. Audience members choose what script will be performed and often intervene during the performance to demand a repeat of a song or skit.

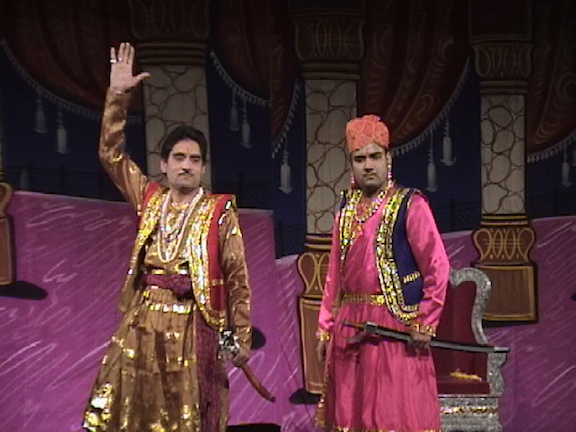
Legendary Nautanki artist and Sangeet Natak Akademi awardee Pandit Ramdayal Sharma as Amar Singh Rathore and Dr. Devendra Sharma as Ram Singh in Amar Singh Rathore

Nautanki performances can take place in any open space available in or around a village that can accommodate audiences in hundreds or thousands. Sometimes this space is made available by the village Chaupal (village community center). Other times, the playground of the local school becomes the performance site. A Nautanki stage is elevated above the ground and is made up of wooden cots (usually provided by local villagers). Until a few decades back, there was no electricity in Indian villages, so light was provided either by big lanterns or Petromax (a device run by kerosene oil).

Traditional Nautanki performances usually start late at night, often around 10 P.M., and go all night until sunrise the next morning (for a total of 8–10 hours). There is no intermission in Nautanki performances.

== Repertoires ==
Repertoire of traditional Nautankis range from mythological and folk tales to stories of contemporary heroes. For instance, while Nautanki plays such as Satya-Harishchandra and Bhakt Moradhwaj are based on mythological themes, Indal Haran and Puranmal originated from folklore. In the first half of the 20th century, contemporary sentiment against British rule and feudal landlords found expression in Nautankis such as Sultana Daku, Jallianwala Bagh, and Amar Singh Rathore.

In the last four decades, Pandit Ramdayal Sharma (a renowned Nautanki maestro) and later Dr. Devendra Sharma have co-authored many new Nautankis. These new Nautankis are centered on contemporary social messages such as health, HIV/AIDS, women empowerment, dowry, immigration, and family planning. They are of a much shorter duration — around two hours. This is to give audiences an opportunity to watch performances during a break in their daily routine. These contemporary Nautankis have been performed extensively in India and America and met with resounding popularity.

Some popular traditional Nautankis are Syah-Posh (Pak Mohabbat), Sultana Daku, Indal Haran, Amar Singh Rathore, Bhakt Puranmal, and Harischandra-Taramati. Some popular contemporary ones are Mission Suhani, Subah ka Bhoola, Behkaani and Muskaani, and Beti ka Byah (all of these contemporary Nautankis are written by Pandit Ram Dayal Sharma).

== Overseas ==
In 2002, Nautanki was introduced in America and Europe by Dr. Devendra Sharma, a Nautanki artist, singer, writer, director, and scholar of communication and performance. The participants in Sharma's productions are engineers, doctors, students and other members of the Indian diaspora living in America, and Europe who are given a rare opportunity to connect with their cultural roots. At the same time, these performances have exposed other communities in America to Indian culture.

One such Nautanki is Mission Suhani, an original Nautanki co-authored by Sharma and Pandit Ram Dayal Sharma that communicates a contemporary and controversial social issue concerning Indians and Indian immigrants in America. It critically examines the phenomenon of some Indian men who come to America to study or work but go back to India and get married — either because of parental pressure or to get a big dowry (cash given to the groom's family by the bride's side). Many of these men leave their wives in India and never bring them to America, where they often have another wife or a girlfriend. One of the unique aspects of this Nautanki is that it is bilingual (Hindi and English). This protects the traditional operatic and artistic elements of Nautanki while effectively communicating the story and contemporary social issue to a diverse audience. Nautankis such as Mission Suhani involving global social issues help to update Nautanki to emerging issues in India and around the world.

== Sources ==
- Sharma, Devendra (6 February 2025). Nautanki. London: Methuen Drama. ISBN 978-1-350-29672-5.
- Kathryn Hansen (1991). Grounds for Play: The Nautanki Theatre of North India. University of California Press. p. 354. ISBN 9780520910881.
- Ramnarayan Agrawal (1976). Saangit:Ek Lok Natya. Rajpal and Sons. Delhi
- Devendra Sharma (2006). Performing Nautanki: Popular Community Folk Performances as Sites of Dialogue and Social Change. Ohio University.
