= Gulabi (2014 film) =

2014 Indian film

- Directed by: Guddu Dhanoa
- Produced by: Santosh Dhanoa; Aniket Karnik; Renuka Karnik
- Starring: Sachin Khedekar; Pakhi Hegde; Vineet Sharma
- Cinematography: Raju Key Gee
- Edited by: Umesh Rane
- Music by: Dilip Sen
- Release date: 12 September 2014
- Country: India
- Language: Marathi

Gulabi is an Indian Marathi language film directed by Guddu Dhanoa and produced by Santosh Dhanoa, Aniket Karnik and Renuka Karnik. The film stars Sachin Khedekar , Pakkhi Hegde and Vineet Sharma. The film was released on 12 September 2014.

== Synopsis ==
ACP Arjun is authorized to arrest Gulabi, a dance bar girl. Their story takes a turn when the girl's charm makes Arjun forget about his duty. Gulabi is revealed to be the direct victim of the dance bar and the system which governs its employees.

== Cast ==
- Sachin Khedekar as Arjun
- Pakkhi Hegde as Gulabi
- Vineet Sharma as Ravi Kale
- Kaajal Vashisht as Mallika
- Vinay Apte as Sarpotdar
- Jaspal Sandhu

== Soundtrack ==
Gulabi

Soundtrack album by Dilip Sen
- Released: 2014
- Recorded: 2014
- Genre: Feature film soundtrack
- Length: 2:01
- Language: Marathi

Official audio
- Gulabi March – Full Album on YouTube

Track listing
No.	Title	Singer(s)	Length
1.	"Gulabi Mazha Naav ahe"	Maya Govind	2:01
Total length:			2:01

== Critical response ==
Gulabi received negative reviews from critics. Mihir Bhanage of The Times of India rated the film 2 out of 5 stars and wrote "Guddu Dhanoa has tried his best to make a unique love story but sadly, it doesn't quite strike a chord with the viewers. Watch this one only if you have to". Ganesh Matkari of Pune Mirror wrote "The only saving grace to an extent is Sachin Khedekar's presence and the dignity it brings to the scenes. Beyond that, the lesser said about the film the better". A reviewer from Divya Marathi wrote "Being a dance bar theme, the layout is a bit gaudy. It is not a subject that can be watched with the family. But the dire reality of Barbal's sufferings and the current social situation comes out in 'Gulabi'". Soumitra Pote of Maharashtra Times rated the film 1.5 out of 5 stars and wrote "Story, screenplay, dialogues, acting, logic except for exception, this movie is deceived in all respects... making one say that the theme of the cage is 'a mockery today'."
