= Gulab-e Sofla =

Gulab-e Sofla گولاب سفلي
- Village
- Location within Iran
- Coordinates: 33°39′38″N 48°31′36″E
- Country: Iran
- Province: Lorestan
- County: Khorramabad
- Bakhsh: Bayravand
- Rural District: Beyranvand-e Jonubi

Population (2006)
  - Total: 28
- Time zone: UTC+3:30 (IRST)
  - Summer (DST): UTC+4:30 (IRDT)

Gulab-e Sofla (Persian: گولاب سفلي, also Romanized as Gūlāb-e Soflá; also known as Gūlāb-e Pā’īn) is a village in Beyranvand-e Jonubi Rural District, Bayravand District, Khorramabad County, Lorestan Province, Iran. At the 2006 census, its population was 28, in 6 families.
