= Rajiv Tomar =

Indian wrestler (born 1980)

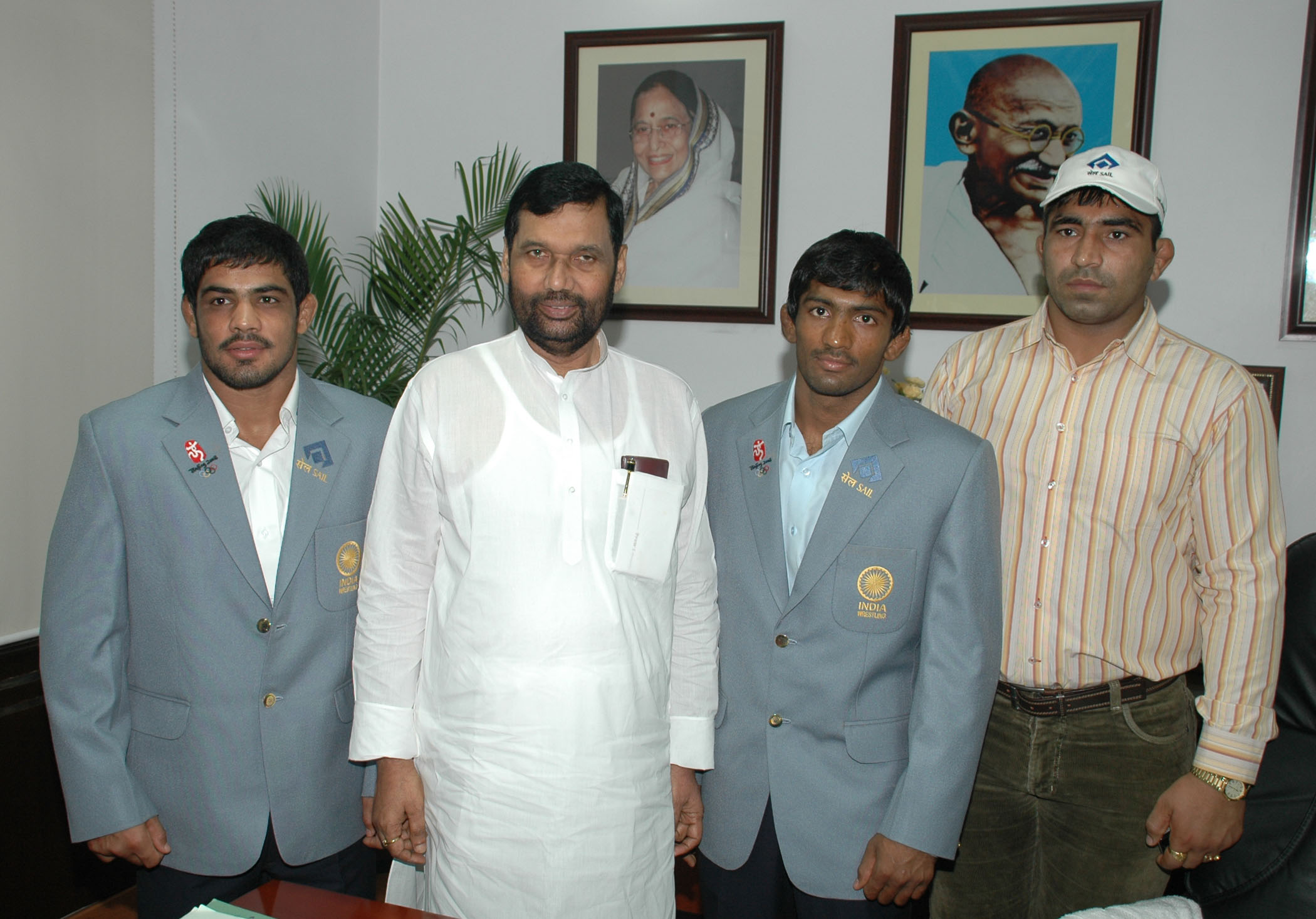
- Sushil Kumar, Ram Vilas Paswan, Yogeshwar Dutt and Rajiv Tomar, 2008

Personal information
- Nationality: Indian
- Born: 31 December 1980 (age 45) Malakpur, Baraut, Uttar Pradesh, India
- Height: 175 cm (5 ft 9 in)

Sport
- Country: India
- Sport: Wrestling
- Event: 120 kg freestyle
- Club: Guru Hanuman Akhara
- Coached by: Maha Singh Rao
Medal record
Men's freestyle wrestling
Representing India
Commonwealth Championships
Silver medal – second place	2005	120 kg
Gold medal – first place	2007	120 kg
Bronze medal – third place	2011	120 kg
Commonwealth Games
Silver medal – second place	2014 Glasgow	125 kg
Asian Championships
Bronze medal – third place	1998	90 kg
- Updated on 4 August 2021

Rajiv Tomar (born 31 December 1980) is an Indian wrestler. He represented India in the men's freestyle 120 kg category at the 2008 Summer Olympics in Beijing, but lost to Steve Mocco of United States in qualifications.

He is from Malakpur in Baghpat district in Uttar Pradesh.

He is Arjun Award Winner 2010 (Wrestling). He also won Indian style wrestling event, Hind Kesari.

Rajiv won silver medal in Men's freestyle 125 kg wrestling event in 2014 Commonwealth Games in Glasgow. He has won Bharat Kesari Title 32 times. He learnt Kushti in Guru Hanuman Akhara by Coach Shri Mahasingh Rao. He won bronze medal in Asian Championship in year 1998. He was a powerful wrestler in 120 kg in India and world. He won silver medal in Oman in year 2005. He had won gold medal in Commonwealth games Canada in 2007. He got Arjun Award in 2010. He is a wrestler in Indian Style Dangal wrestling. He got married in 2011 to a professor in Delhi University.

== See also ==
- India at the 2008 Summer Olympics
