= Roop Nagar =

- Neighborhood of Delhi
- Country: India
- State: Delhi

Languages
  - Official: Hindi
- Time zone: UTC+5:30 (IST)

Roop Nagar is a residential district in Delhi, India. It is close to the Delhi metro station Vishwavidyalaya Metro Station and the GTB Nagar Metro Station. It is next to the Kamla Nagar market of North Delhi and the Delhi University, North Campus.

Roop Nagar includes a police station, fire station, four government secondary schools, and seven parks. It contains the Manka-Meshwari temple, a Lordess Durga temple. Other temples include the Radha-Gobind temple and a Digambar Jain temple along with an upasharay.
