= Gulab-e Vosta =

Gulab-e Vosta گولاب وسطي
- Village
- Location within Iran
- Coordinates: 33°39′21″N 48°31′32″E
- Country: Iran
- Province: Lorestan
- County: Khorramabad
- Bakhsh: Bayravand
- Rural District: Beyranvand-e Jonubi

Population (2006)
  - Total: 62
- Time zone: UTC+3:30 (IRST)
  - Summer (DST): UTC+4:30 (IRDT)

Gulab-e Vosta (Persian: گولاب وسطي, also Romanized as Gūlāb-e Vosţá and Gūlāb-e Vosṭī; also known as Gūlāb-e Vasaţ, Gulāb-e Bālā, Gūlāb-e Mīān, and Gūlāb-e ‘Olyā) is a village in Beyranvand-e Jonubi Rural District, Bayravand District, Khorramabad County, Lorestan Province, Iran. At the 2006 census, its population was 62, in 13 families.
