= Guru Hanuman =

Indian wrestling coach

- Born: Vijay Pal Yadav; 15 March 1901; Chirawa, Rajasthan
- Died: 24 May 1999 (aged 98); Meerut, Uttar Pradesh

Vijay Pal Yadav (15 March 1901 – 24 May 1999) better known as Guru Hanuman, was a legendary wrestling coach of India who coached many medal-winning wrestlers. He was awarded the prestigious Dronacharya Award in 1987, the highest recognition for a sports coach in India, and the Padma Shri in 1983.

== Early life ==
Guru was born as Vijay Pal Yadav on 15 March 1901, in the Chirawa town of Rajasthan state. He did not attend school, but began wrestling at the local village akhada from an early age. He moved to Delhi in 1919 to set up a shop near Birla Mills in Subzi Mundi, but instead became a wrestler and soon gained popularity in the field.

== Career ==
The Indian industrialist K. K. Birla gave him land to set up Akhara in Malkaganj, Subzi Mandi (Old Delhi), thus 'Birla Mills Vyayamshala' was born around 1925 which was being managed by Birla Mills, Kamla Nagar, Delhi, which subsequently known as the Guru Hanuman Akhara.

Both as a wrestler and as a coach, Guru Hanuman was a legend as he created a template for modern Indian wrestling, by mixing traditional Indian wrestling style, pehlwani with international wrestling standards. In time he coached almost all of India's freestyle international wrestlers. His disciples Sudesh Kumar and Prem Nath won gold medals at the Cardiff Commonwealth Games in 1958. Other notable disciples, Satpal and Kartar Singh won gold medals in Asian Games in 1982 and 1986, respectively. Eight of his disciples got the highest Indian sporting honour Arjuna award.

He was a bachelor and lacto-vegetarian. His vegetarian diet was heavy in dairy products. In 1984, Guru Hanuman authored an article in the Bhartiya Kushti magazine arguing that a vegetarian diet can build a strong physique.

He died in a car crash on 24 May 1999, near Meerut, on his way to Haridwar. On 9 August 2003, a statue of Guru Hanuman was unveiled at the Kalyan Vihar Sports Stadium, in New Delhi, by former Delhi Chief Minister, Madan Lal Khurana.

== Guru Hanuman Akhara (Birla Mills Vyayamshala) ==
Guru Hanuman Akhara is a wrestlers training centre or akhara in traditional Hindi dialect. Established in 1925 at Shakti Nagar, near Roshanara Bagh in North Delhi and it soon became the epicentre of Indian wrestling. Situated in the Old Delhi region, this akhara is said to have produced some of the brightest Indian wrestlers like Dara Singh, Hans Ram (Post India Best Wrestler), Guru Satpal, Uddal Singh (national champion and multiple time Haryana state champion) Subhash Verma, Virender Singh, Sushil Kumar, Yogendra Kumar, Vishal Trikha, Anuj Chowdhary, Rajiv Tomer, Anil Mann, Sujit Mann, Chaand khatri, Naveen, and Rakesh Goonga. It is the oldest extant wrestling school in India.

The young wrestlers training there are said to have an unshakeable belief that the land is blessed. So much that even when the government offered to provide a larger land with better training facilities, most of the wrestlers refused to shift out of the dilapidated buildings. However, due to lack of space, a modern gymnasium was built by the government at some distance from the akhara which is used by the trainees. The akhara is named after Guru Hanuman and currently trains about 200 wrestlers under the guidance of Maha Singh Rao.

In 2014, the wrestling academy was chosen for the 2014 Rashtritya Khel Protsahan Puraskar (RKPP) by Government of India.
