= Maha Singh Rao =

Indian wrestler

Rao in 2006, wearing ceremonial attire upon receiving his Dronacharya Award

Maha Singh Rao (born 1 July 1958) is an Indian wrestler and wrestling coach from Chirawa, Rajasthan. In 2006, he was awarded the Dronacharya Award, the highest award in India for athletic coaching.

== Early life ==
Rao was born on 1 July 1958 in the small village of Ghardana Khurd, within the city of Jhunjhunu, Rajasthan, to Bhana Ram Rao and Mohri Devi. He was one of their six children, the family living in Ghardana Khurd. After attending primary school in the village, he went to high school in Khetri. He then attended Chirawa College in the town of Chirawa within Jhunjhunu, which he graduated from in 1980 with a mathematics degree. He married a "Mrs. Santosh'" on 15 June 1983.

== Career ==
After finishing his studies, Rao joined the Sports Authority of India as a wrestling coach. He started training disciples in both freestyle wrestling, and an Indian style known as pehlwani. His initial posting was at the Guru Hanuman Akhara in New Delhi, at the time managed by Guru Hanuman, a legendary figure in Indian wrestling. Rao started training the budding pehlwans under Hanuman's guidance. Rao was briefly transferred to the city of Sri Ganganagar in Rajasthan, but was soon sent back to New Delhi, where he currently coaches at the Guru Hanuman Akhara. After Hanuman died in May 1999, Rao assumed his role.

Rao receiving the Dronacharya Award from Indian president A. P. J. Abdul Kalam

Rao was sent by the Indian government to attend the international coaching course in Budapest in 2005. The course is conducted by the Universitas Budapestinesis de semmelweis nominata and is recognised by the International Olympic Committee for Olympic solidarity. Rao was selected for the Dronacharya Award for the year 2005, and he received it from Indian president A. P. J. Abdul Kalam in 2006.

Many of Rao's disciples have won national and international titles, such as the Arjun Award. Notable persons include Sandeep Kumar Rathi (Bharat Kesari title winner), Rajiv Tomar (Hind Kesri and Arjun Award winner, and a gold medalist in the 2006 Commonwealth Games), Anuj Chaudhary (Arjun Award winner), Sujeet Maan (Arjun Award winner).
