= Satpal Singh =

Indian wrestler and coach (born 1955)

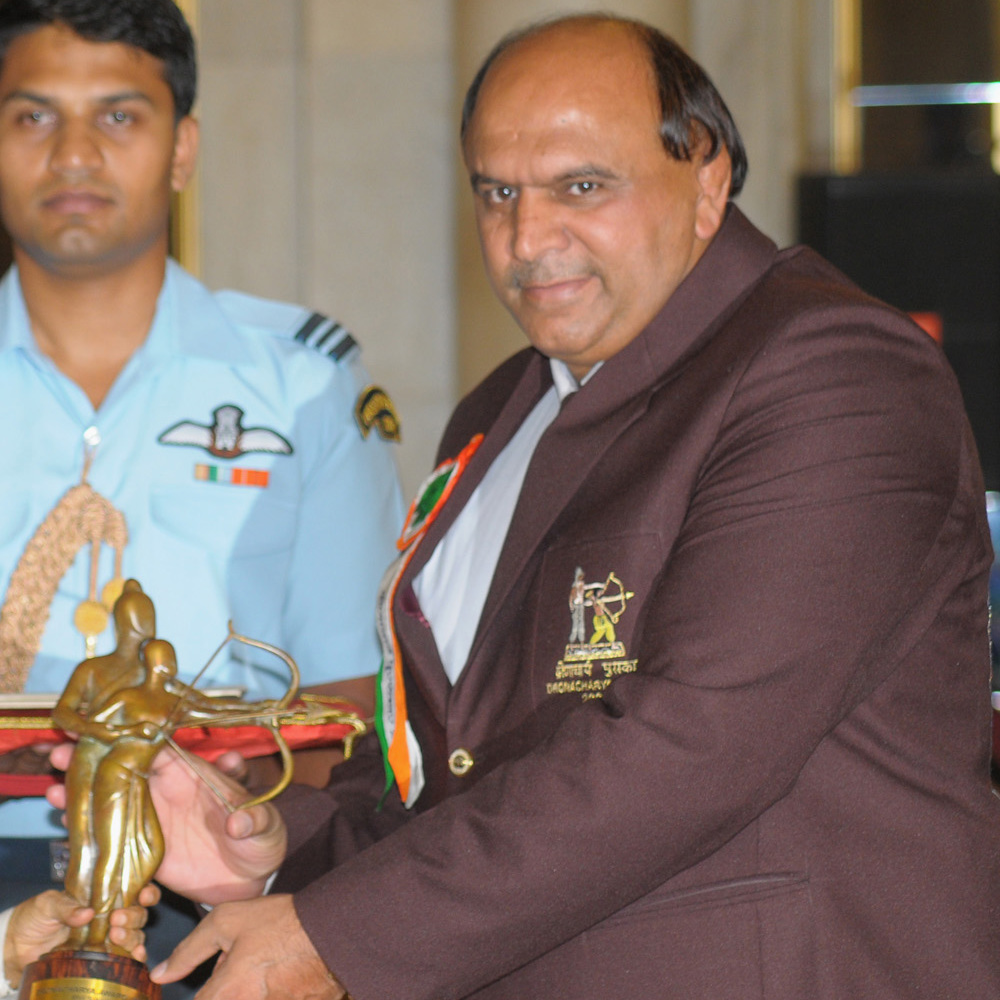
- Singh receiving Dronacharya Award in 2009

Personal information
- Nationality: Indian
- Born: 1 February 1955 (age 71) Delhi, India
- Height: 182 cm (6 ft 0 in)

Sport
- Country: India
- Sport: Wrestling
- Event: 82 & 100 kg freestyle
- Club: Guru Hanuman Akhara
- Coached by: Guru Hanuman (Daronacharya awardee)
Medal record
Representing India
Men's Freestyle Wrestling
Commonwealth Games
| Silver medal – second place | 1974 Christchurch | Middleweight |
| Silver medal – second place | 1978 Edmonton, Alberta | Heavyweight |
| Silver medal – second place | 1982 Brisbane | Heavyweight |
Asian Games
| Bronze medal – third place | 1974 Tehran | 82 kg |
| Silver medal – second place | 1978 Bangkok | Heavyweight |
| Gold medal – first place | 1982 New Delhi | Heavyweight |
- Updated on 5 December 2014

Satpal Singh (born 1 February 1955), also known as Guru Satpal, is a wrestling coach and former wrestler of India. He was a gold medalist in 1982 Asian Games and a bronze medalist in 1974 Asian Games. Today he is better known as the coach of Olympic medal winners Sushil Kumar, Ravi Kumar Dahiya and Aman Sehrawat.

He was awarded Padma Bhushan, the third highest civilian award of India, in 2015.

== Biography ==
Chaudhary Satpal Singh Sehrawat was born on 1 February 1955 in Bawana village in a Jat family in Delhi. He was coached by the famous wrestling coach Guru Hanuman at Hanuman Akhara, Delhi. He was Indian national champion for 16 years. He achieved international success at commonwealth games winning 3 silver medals in 1974, 1978 and 1982 commonwealth games. In Asian Games too, he improved his performance at successive games, winning a bronze in 1974, a silver in 1978 and peaked with a gold in 1982. Satpal was also good in traditional kushti. He won several titles like Bharat Kumar (1973), Rustom-e-Hind (1974 and 1975), Bharat Kesari (1975), Rustom-e-Bharat (1975), Maha Bharat Kesari (1976), Mahan Bharat Kesari (1976), Rustom-e-Zaman (1976), Hind Kesari (1977), Bharat Shri (1978) and Bharat Balram (1979).

Satpal now works as assistant director of Education, Delhi. He is also the Chief Patron of the School Games Federation of India. He runs an Akhada for coaching wrestling with fellow coach Virender Singh from 1988 in Chhatrasal Stadium in Delhi. He trained two time Olympic medal winner, Sushil Kumar for the Beijing Olympics 2008 and London Olympics 2012.

He was awarded Dronacharya Award in 2009 by the Indian Government. He was earlier conferred the Arjuna Award in 1974 and the Padma Shri in 1983. He was the chief guest in Senior National T-10 Leg-cricket championship 2012 organised by Leg Cricket Federation of India at Rajiv Gandhi Stadium, Delhi.

== Awards and achievements ==
- 1974:Arjun Award (Wrestling)
- 1983:Padma Shri
- 2009:Dronacharya Award
- National Heavyweight Champion 16 times.
- 2015: Padma Bhushan

== Participation ==
- Wrestling at the 1980 Summer Olympics - Men's freestyle 100 kg
