= List of Philippines men's national basketball team head coaches =

The following is a list of people who had assumed the role of head coach for the Philippines men's national basketball team.

== List ==
| Name | Nationality | Term | | Competitions | Result | Ref. |
| Name | Nationality | Start | End | Competitions | Result | Ref. |
|---|---|---|---|---|---|---|
| Pedro Villanueva | Philippines | 1930 | | 1930 Far Eastern Games | (gold) 1st | |
| Alfredo Del Rosario | Philippines | 1934 | | 1934 Far Eastern Games | (gold) 1st | |
| Dionisio Calvo | Philippines | 1936 | | 1936 Summer Olympics | 5th | |
| Dionisio Calvo | Philippines | 1948 | | 1948 Summer Olympics | 12th | |
| Dionisio Calvo | Philippines | 1951 | | 1951 Asian Games | (gold) 1st | |
| Felicisimo Fajardo | Philippines | 1952 | | 1952 Summer Olympics | 9th | |
| Herminio Silva | Philippines | 1954 | 1954 | 1954 Asian Games | (gold) 1st | |
| Herminio Silva | Philippines | 1954 | 1954 | 1954 FIBA World Championship | (bronze) 3rd | |
| Leo Prieto | Philippines | 1956 | | 1956 Summer Olympics | 7th | |
| Valentin Eduque | Philippines | 1958 | | 1958 Asian Games | (gold) 1st | |
| Baby Dalupan | Philippines | 1959 | | 1959 FIBA World Championship | 8th | |
| Arturo Rius | Philippines | 1960 | 1960 | 1960 ABC Championship | (gold) 1st | |
| Arturo Rius | Philippines | 1960 | 1960 | 1960 Summer Olympics | 11th | |
| Enrique Crame | Philippines | 1962 | | 1962 Asian Games | (gold) 1st | |
| Felicisimo Fajardo | Philippines | 1963 | | 1963 ABC Championship | (gold) 1st | |
| Valentin Eduque | Philippines | 1964 | | 1964 Pre-Olympic Basketball Tournament | 6th | |
| Felicisimo Fajardo | Philippines | 1965 | 1966 | 1965 ABC Championship | (silver) 2nd | |
| Felicisimo Fajardo | Philippines | 1965 | 1966 | 1966 Asian Games | 6th | |
| Carlos Loyzaga | Philippines | 1967 | 1968 | 1967 ABC Championship | (gold) 1st | |
| Carlos Loyzaga | Philippines | 1967 | 1968 | 1968 Summer Olympics | 13th | |
| Lauro Mumar | Philippines | 1969 | | 1969 ABC Championship | (bronze) 3rd | |
| Baby Dalupan | Philippines | 1970 | | 1970 Asian Games | 5th | |
| Ignacio Ramos | Philippines | 1971 | 1972 | 1971 ABC Championship | (silver) 2nd | |
| Ignacio Ramos | Philippines | 1971 | 1972 | 1972 Summer Olympics | 13th | |
| Valentin Eduque | Philippines | 1973 | 1974 | 1973 ABC Championship | (gold) 1st | |
| Valentin Eduque | Philippines | 1973 | 1974 | 1974 FIBA World Championship | 13th | |
| Valentin Eduque | Philippines | 1973 | 1974 | 1974 Asian Games | 4th | |
| Francisco "Kiko" Calilan | Philippines | 1975 | | 1975 ABC Championship | 5th | |
| Honesto Mayoralgo | Philippines | 1976 | 1977 | 1977 Southeast Asian Games | (gold) 1st | |
| Honesto Mayoralgo | Philippines | 1976 | 1977 | 1977 ABC Championship | 5th | |
| Nicanor Jorge | Philippines | 1978 | 1978 | 1978 FIBA World Championship | 8th | |
| Nicanor Jorge | Philippines | 1978 | 1978 | 1978 Asian Games | 4th | |
| Nat Canson | Philippines | 1979 | | 1979 Southeast Asian Games | (silver) 2nd | |
| Freddie Webb | Philippines | 1979 | | 1979 ABC Championship | 4th | |
| Filomeno "Pilo" Pumaren | Philippines | 1981 | 1981 | 1981 ABC Championship | 4th | |
| Filomeno "Pilo" Pumaren | Philippines | 1981 | 1981 | 1981 Southeast Asian Games | (gold) 1st | |
| Nat Canson | Philippines | 1982 | | 1982 Asian Games | 4th | |
| Larry Albano | Philippines | 1983 | | 1983 Southeast Asian Games | (gold) 1st | |
| Ron Jacobs | United States | 1980 | 1986 | 1983 ABC Championship | 9th | |
| Ron Jacobs | United States | 1980 | 1986 | 1985 ABC Championship | (gold) 1st | |
| Ron Jacobs | United States | 1980 | 1986 | 1985 Southeast Asian Games | (gold) 1st | |
| Joe Lipa | Philippines | 1986 | 1989 | 1986 Asian Games | (bronze) 3rd | |
| Joe Lipa | Philippines | 1986 | 1989 | 1987 Southeast Asian Games | (gold) 1st | |
| Joe Lipa | Philippines | 1986 | 1989 | 1987 ABC Championship | 4th | |
| Derick Pumaren | Philippines | 1989 | 1989 | 1989 Southeast Asian Games | (silver) 2nd | |
| Derick Pumaren | Philippines | 1989 | 1989 | 1989 ABC Championship | 8th | |
| Robert Jaworski | Philippines | 1990 | | 1990 Asian Games | (silver) 2nd | |
| Francis Rodriguez | Philippines | 1991 | 1991 | 1991 ABC Championship | 7th | |
| Francis Rodriguez | Philippines | 1991 | 1991 | 1991 Southeast Asian Games | (gold) 1st | |
| Rogelio Melencio | Philippines | 1993 | 1993 | 1993 Southeast Asian Games | (gold) 1st | |
| Rogelio Melencio | Philippines | 1993 | 1993 | 1993 ABC Championship | 11th | |
| Virgil Villavicencio | Philippines | 1994 | | 1994 SEABA Championship | 4th | |
| Norman Black | United States | 1994 | | 1994 Asian Games | 4th | |
| Arlene Rodriguez | Philippines | 1995 | | 1995 ABC Championship | 12th | |
| Joe Lipa | Philippines | 1995 | | 1995 Southeast Asian Games | (gold) 1st | |
| Dong Vergeire | Philippines | 1996 | 1998 | 1996 SEABA Championship | (silver) 2nd | |
| Dong Vergeire | Philippines | 1996 | 1998 | 1997 ABC Championship | 9th | |
| Dong Vergeire | Philippines | 1996 | 1998 | 1997 Southeast Asian Games | (gold) 1st | |
| Dong Vergeire | Philippines | 1996 | 1998 | 1998 SEABA Championship | (gold) 1st | |
| Tim Cone | United States | 1998 | | 1998 Asian Games | (bronze) 3rd | |
| Louie Alas | Philippines | 1999 | | 1999 Southeast Asian Games | (gold) 1st | |
| Victor "Rambo" Sanchez | Philippines | 1999 | | 1999 ABC Championship | 11th | |
| David "Boysie" Zamar | Philippines | 2001 | 2001 | 2001 SEABA Championship | (gold) 1st | |
| David "Boysie" Zamar | Philippines | 2001 | 2001 | 2001 Southeast Asian Games | (gold) 1st | |
| Ron Jacobs | United States | 2002 | | | | (Note: Jacobs was supposed to coach the national team in the 2002 Asian Games in Busan but he suffered a stroke shortly after being appointed and was eventually replaced by Jong Uichico, one of his assistants.) |
| Jong Uichico | Philippines | 2002 | | 2002 Asian Games | 4th | |
| Aric del Rosario | Philippines | 2003 | 2003 | 2003 SEABA Championship | (gold) 1st | |
| Aric del Rosario | Philippines | 2003 | 2003 | 2003 ABC Championship | 15th | |
| Aric del Rosario | Philippines | 2003 | 2003 | 2003 Southeast Asian Games | (gold) 1st | |
| Eric King | Philippines | 2004 | | 2004 FIBA Asia Stanković Cup | 8th | (Note: The RP representative in the inaugural FIBA Asia Stanković Cup (later renamed FIBA Asia Cup and now referred to as the FIBA Asia Challenge) wasn’t the national team but members of the Philippine College of Criminology varsity plus several "outsiders." Johnny Tam was listed as the ragtag team’s official head coach but neither he nor his assistant, Ching Marcelino, made the trip to Taipei. Instead, team official Eric King called the shots on the sidelines while receiving instructions via cellphone from Tam in Manila.) |
| David "Boysie" Zamar | Philippines | 2005 | | | | (Note: Zamar was tapped to coach the national team in the 2005 Southeast Asian Games but the sport was scrapped from the event as the host country was still suspended by FIBA.) |
| Chot Reyes | Philippines | 2005 | 2008 | 2007 SEABA Championship | (gold) 1st | |
| Chot Reyes | Philippines | 2005 | 2008 | 2007 FIBA Asia Championship | 9th | |
| Junel Baculi | Philippines | 2007 | | 2007 Southeast Asian Games | (gold) 1st | (Note: Baculi coached the national team that participated at the 2007 Southeast Asian Games.) |
| Yeng Guiao | Philippines | 2008 | 2009 | 2009 SEABA Championship | (gold) 1st | |
| Yeng Guiao | Philippines | 2008 | 2009 | 2009 FIBA Asia Championship | 8th | |
| Rajko Toroman | Serbia | 2009 | 2011 | 2010 FIBA Asia Stanković Cup | 4th | |
| Rajko Toroman | Serbia | 2009 | 2011 | 2010 Asian Games | 6th | |
| Rajko Toroman | Serbia | 2009 | 2011 | 2011 SEABA Championship | (gold) 1st | |
| Rajko Toroman | Serbia | 2009 | 2011 | 2011 FIBA Asia Championship | 4th | |
| Norman Black | United States | 2011 | | 2011 Southeast Asian Games | (gold) 1st | |
| Chot Reyes | Philippines | 2012 | 2014 | 2012 SEABA Cup | (gold) 1st | |
| Chot Reyes | Philippines | 2012 | 2014 | 2012 FIBA Asia Cup | 4th | |
| Chot Reyes | Philippines | 2012 | 2014 | 2013 FIBA Asia Championship | (silver) 2nd | |
| Chot Reyes | Philippines | 2012 | 2014 | 2014 FIBA Asia Cup | (bronze) 3rd | |
| Chot Reyes | Philippines | 2012 | 2014 | 2014 FIBA Basketball World Cup | 21st | |
| Chot Reyes | Philippines | 2012 | 2014 | 2014 Asian Games | 7th | |
| Jong Uichico | Philippines | 2013 | | 2013 Southeast Asian Games | (gold) 1st | |
| Tab Baldwin | New Zealand; United States | 2015 | 2016 | 2015 SEABA Championship | (gold) 1st | |
| Tab Baldwin | New Zealand; United States | 2015 | 2016 | 2015 Southeast Asian Games | (gold) 1st | |
| Tab Baldwin | New Zealand; United States | 2015 | 2016 | 2015 FIBA Asia Championship | (silver) 2nd | |
| Tab Baldwin | New Zealand; United States | 2015 | 2016 | 2016 FIBA World Olympic Qualifying Tournament – Manila | DNQ | |
| Nash Racela | Philippines | 2016 | | 2016 SEABA Cup | (gold) 1st | (Note: Racela was the head coach of the national team that participated at the 2016 SEABA Cup. Baldwin remained coach of the team that participated at the 2016 FIBA World Olympic Qualifying Tournament in Manila.) |
| Josh Reyes | Philippines | 2016 | | 2016 FIBA Asia Challenge | 9th | (Note: Josh Reyes, son of Chot Reyes, was the interim head coach of the national team that participated at the 2016 FIBA Asia Challenge.) |
| Chot Reyes | Philippines | 2016 | 2018 | 2017 SEABA Championship | (gold) 1st | |
| Chot Reyes | Philippines | 2016 | 2018 | 2017 FIBA Asia Cup | 7th | |
| Chot Reyes | Philippines | 2016 | 2018 | 2019 FIBA Basketball World Cup qualification | | (Note: Reyes resigned as head coach in September 2018 while still suspended following the Philippines-Australia brawl in the 2019 FIBA World Cup Qualifiers. Guiao was eventually named as his replacement and coached the national team for the remainder of the qualifiers.) |
| Jong Uichico | Philippines | 2017 | | 2017 Southeast Asian Games | (gold) 1st | (Note: Uichico led the Philippine national team that participated at the 2017 Southeast Asian Games instead of the Chot Reyes, who led the Philippine squad which played at the 2017 FIBA Asia Cup due to an overlapping schedule between the two competitions.) |
| Yeng Guiao | Philippines | 2018 | 2019 | 2018 Asian Games | 5th | (Note: Guiao coached the team which participated at the 2018 Asian Games due to the suspension on national team coach, Chot Reyes due to his involvement in the Philippines-Australia brawl in the 2019 FIBA World Cup qualifiers. Although the Asian Games is not part of the scope of the sanctions, the SBP decided against fielding suspended players for the Asian Games and designating Reyes as head coach of the team.) |
| Yeng Guiao | Philippines | 2018 | 2019 | 2019 FIBA Basketball World Cup qualification | Q | |
| Yeng Guiao | Philippines | 2018 | 2019 | 2019 FIBA Basketball World Cup | 32nd | |
| Tim Cone | United States | 2019 | | 2019 Southeast Asian Games | (gold) 1st | |
| Mark Dickel | New Zealand | 2020 | | 2022 FIBA Asia Cup qualification | | |
| Jong Uichico | Philippines | 2020 | | 2022 FIBA Asia Cup qualification | | |
| Tab Baldwin | New Zealand; United States | 2021 | 2022 | 2022 FIBA Asia Cup qualification | | |
| Tab Baldwin | New Zealand; United States | 2021 | | 2020 FIBA World Olympic Qualifying Tournament – Belgrade | DNQ | |
| Chot Reyes | Philippines | 2022 | | 2021 Southeast Asian Games | (silver) 2nd | |
| Nenad Vučinić | New Zealand | 2022 | | 2023 FIBA Basketball World Cup qualification | | |
| Chot Reyes | Philippines | 2022 | 2023 | 2022 FIBA Asia Cup | 9th | |
| Chot Reyes | Philippines | 2022 | 2023 | 2023 Southeast Asian Games | (gold) 1st | |
| Chot Reyes | Philippines | 2022 | 2023 | 2023 FIBA Basketball World Cup | 24th | |
| Tim Cone | United States | 2023 | incumbent | 2022 Asian Games | (gold) 1st | |
| Tim Cone | United States | 2023 | incumbent | 2024 FIBA World Olympic Qualifying Tournament - Riga | SF | |
| Tim Cone | United States | 2023 | incumbent | 2025 FIBA Asia Cup qualification | | |
| Tim Cone | United States | 2023 | incumbent | 2025 FIBA Asia Cup | 7th | |
| Norman Black | United States | 2025 | | 2025 Southeast Asian Games | (gold) 1st | |
