= Carlos Badion =

Filipino basketball player

Personal information
- Born: August 16, 1935 Lubao, Pampanga, Philippine Islands
- Died: June 20, 2002 (aged 66) Tondo, Manila, Philippines
- Listed height: 5 ft 11 in (1.80 m)
- Listed weight: 180 lb (82 kg)

Career information
- High school: Jose Abad Santos High School (Manila)
- College: Mapúa

Career history

Playing
- Crispa Redmanizers
- YCO Painters

Coaching
- 1978–1982: Mapúa
- 1982–1984: UST
Medals
Men's basketball
Representing Philippines
ABC Championship
Gold medal – first place	1960 Manila	Team
Asian Games
Gold medal – first place	1958 Tokyo	Team

Carlos Velasco Badion (August 16, 1935 – June 20, 2002) was a Filipino basketball player. Although born in Lubao, Pampanga, he grew up in Tondo, Manila where he started his checkered career playing in sandlot tournaments and for Abad Santos High School in Manila. At 5'11" tall, he was first spotted in an interscholastic tournament by Valerio Lopez of Mapua where he subsequently enrolled. He eventually shone in the NCAA and the MICAA, playing for such teams as the Jacinto Rubber Shoes, Crispa (where he became one of the pioneering members of that team) and YCO.

Known as the "Bad Boy" of Philippine basketball because of his unforgiving and physical defense, Badion popularized the moves that came to be known as the "bicycle drive" and the "jackknife layup", moves which young players tried to imitate during the 1950s. In the commercial leagues, Badion played for the original batch of the Crispa Redmanizers in the Businessman's Athletic Association (BAA) and the YCO Painters in the Manila Industrial Commercial Athletic Association (MICAA).

He starred for the Philippine national team in two Olympic tournaments and the 1958 Asian Games where he and his teammates won the gold medal. He was also a vital cog of the national team that finished seventh in a 15-nation men's basketball tournament in the 1956 Melbourne Olympics, playing alongside the likes of Carlos Loyzaga, Antonio Genato, Ramon Campos Jr., Ramon Manulat, Martin Urra and Mariano Tolentino. Voted Mr. Basketball by the Philippine Sportswriters Association eventually made a movie with the same title together with actor Bob Soler in 1957, Badion was also a mainstay of the team that won the inaugural staging of the Asian Basketball Confederation Championship held in Manila in 1960 together with Loyzaga, Kurt Bachmann, Loreto Carbonell, and Eduardo Lim. He was named to the All-Star team with Loyzaga and Most Valuable Player of the said tournament.

Unfortunately, Badion suffered a serious knee injury during the Philippines' first-round game against Uruguay in the 1960 Rome Olympics which ultimately forced him into early retirement. He then went into a number of business ventures after retiring and even once became the customs coordinator for Elizalde and Company, Inc. He started his coaching in 1975, leading the Mapúa Cardinals to the NCAA title and the UST women's basketball team to the UAAP title. He also handled the UST Glowing Goldies in the UAAP and the Army Jungle Fighters in the Philippine Basketball League.

Badion died of a heart attack on June 20, 2002.
