= 1978 Filmanbank season =

1978 Filmanbank Bankers season
- Head coach: Lauro Mumar

All-Filipino Conference results
- Record: 13–12 (52%)
- Place: 2nd
- Playoff finish: Finals

Open Conference results
- Record: 4–10 (28.6%)
- Place: 7th
- Playoff finish: N/A

Invitational Conference results
- Record: 0–4 (0%)
- Place: 5th
- Playoff finish: N/A

Filmanbank Bankers seasons

The 1978 Filmanbank Bankers season was the 1st season of the Filmanbank franchise in the Philippine Basketball Association (PBA).

== New team ==
Newcomer Filipinas Manufacturers Bank, controlled by auto magnate Ricardo Silverio, bought the rights of the defunct Seven-Up ballclub to play in the professional league and had employed the core of the Uncolas team led by Lawrence Mumar, Jimmy Mariano, Jacinto Chua and Roberto Salonga and piloted by coach Lauro Mumar. Though the new ballclub to be known as "Filmanbank" sold Danny Florencio to Toyota, it bought the services of American Billy Robinson and sweet-shooting Jun Papa. The new team has also recruited Angelito Ladores, once the MICAA's top scorer from L.R.Villar.

== Finals stint ==
In their very first conference, the Bankers managed to win only two games in the first round of eliminations due to its incomplete lineup and landed second to last with a 2–5 win-loss slate. But the Filmanbank five forced a three-way tie for 3rd and 4th qualifying seats in the semifinals with Tanduay and U-Tex. They knock the Wranglers en route to the next round. As the semifinals commenced, Filmanbank further rocked PBA tradition by scoring upsets and surprisingly became the first qualifier in the finals while on the same night, Toyota ousted defending champion Crispa to arranged a confrontation with its sister club.

A cinderella finish was in the making but the favored Tamaraws scored two consecutive victories. Filmanbank came in strong in the third game to extend the series to a fourth meeting. In the final championship game, Toyota was just too much as the Bankers were not able to match the speed and scoring of the Tamaraws. Billy Robinson was the biggest factor in Filmanbank's impressive second-place finish while Larry Mumar and Jun Papa had their share of the glory.

== Roster ==
Filmanbank roster
Players
Coaches

Pos.	No.	Nat.	Name	Ht.	Wt.
G	3	(Philippines)	Orlando delos Santos	5 ft 8 in (1.73 m)		Philippines
G	4	(Philippines)	Roberto Salonga	5 ft 11 in (1.80 m)		UST
G	5	(Philippines)	Ernesto de Leon	6 ft 0 in (1.83 m)		UE
F	6	(Philippines)	Jimmy Mariano	6 ft 4 in (1.93 m)		UE
G	7	(Philippines)	Lawrence Mumar	5 ft 11 in (1.80 m)		UST
G/F	8	(Philippines)	Angelito Ladores	5 ft 11 in (1.80 m)		José Rizal
G	9	(Philippines)	Jaime Otazu	5 ft 9 in (1.75 m)		San Sebastian
F	10	(Philippines)	Jacinto Chua	6 ft 0 in (1.83 m)		Far Eastern
G	13	(Philippines)	Alfredo Enriquez	5 ft 8 in (1.73 m)		USJ–R
F	16	(Philippines)	Romulo Palijo	6 ft 0 in (1.83 m)		PSBA
F	18	(Philippines)	Renato Sidamon	6 ft 1 in (1.85 m)
F	55	(Philippines)	Jun Papa	5 ft 11 in (1.80 m)		National-U
F	33	(United States)	Billy Robinson (I)	6 ft 6 in (1.98 m)		Portland
F/C	42	(United States)	James Allen (I)	6 ft 8 in (2.03 m)

Head coach

- (Philippines) Lauro Mumar

Assistant coach(es)

- (Philippines) Vic Mendoza

Legend

- (C) Team captain
- (I) Import
- Injured
