= Eduardo Lim =

Filipino basketball player (1930–2002)

Personal information
- Born: October 30, 1930 Jaro, Iloilo City, Philippine Islands
- Died: March 25, 2002 (aged 71)
- Listed weight: 170 lb (77 kg)

Career information
- College: San Beda

Career history
- YCO Painters
Medals
Men's basketball
Representing Philippines
ABC Championship
Gold medal – first place	1960 Manila	Team
Asian Games
Gold medal – first place	1954 Manila	Team
Gold medal – first place	1958 Tokyo	Team

Eduardo C. Lim (October 13, 1930 – March 25, 2002), also known as Eddie Lim, was a former basketball player like fellow San Beda Red Lions and Hall of Famers Carlos Loyzaga and Antonio Genato. He was a guard who earned the moniker "Stonewall" from sportscaster Willie Hernandez. He sparked San Beda to the NCAA championships in 1951-52 and the National Open tournament, also in 1952. In the Manila Industrial and Commercial Athletic Association, Lim played a key role for multi-titled YCO that won the National Open crown a record seven straight times under coaches Leo Prieto and Tito Eduque.

Lim, a two-time Olympian, played on two Asian Games gold medal teams in 1954 and 1958. He saw action for the Philippine selection that finished ninth at the 1959 FIBA World Championship in Chile. A hard-nosed guard, Lim led San Beda to back-to-back NCAA titles as a collegian. After retiring, Lim became a successful businessman, chairman of the Makati Stock Exchange, and since 1995, chairman emeritus of the Philippine Stock Exchange.
