= Joaquín Rojas =

Filipino basketball player (1938–2018)

Personal information
- Born: July 6, 1938 Maasin, Leyte, Philippine Commonwealth (now Maasin, Southern Leyte)
- Died: January 30, 2018 (aged 79)
- Listed height: 5 ft 9 in (175 cm)
- Listed weight: 139 lb (63 kg)

Career information
- College: University of the Visayas
- Position: Point guard

Career history
- –: Yutivo
- –: Ysmael Steel Admirals
- –: Mariwasa
- 1975–1976: Toyota Comets

Career highlights
- PBA champion (1975 First and Second Conference)
Medals
Men's basketball
Representing Philippines
ABC Championship
Silver medal – second place	1965 Kuala Lumpur	Team
Gold medal – first place	1967 Seoul	Team
Bronze medal – third place	1969 Bangkok	Team
Silver medal – second place	1971 Tokyo	Team

Joaquín G. Rojas (July 6, 1938 – January 30, 2018) was a Filipino basketball player who played in the Summer Olympics.

== Career ==
Rojas is known for playing in the point guard position. He played for the collegiate squad of the University of the Visayas and was part of the squad that made an upset against Ateneo in the 1957 intercollegiate.

Rojas went on to play at the Manila Industrial and Commercial Athletic Association as he was recruited by Julian Macoy to play for Yutivo in the 1960s but a year later moved to Ysmael Steel Admirals where gained significant reputation. and later with Mariwasa with Narciso Bernardo and Edgardo Roque. He also played for the Toyota Comets during the first two seasons of the Philippine Basketball Association in 1975 and 1976. He helped won titles for Ysmael, and Mariwasa. Rojas also aided Toyota in securing titles during the inaugural 1975 PBA season.

Rojas was part of the Philippines national basketball team from 1965 to 1971. He competed at the 1966 Asian Games which saw the Philippines losing its chance to win a medal after losing to South Korea in the quarterfinal. However Rojas helped the national team secure the 1967 ABC Championship and then competed at the 1968 Summer Olympics. In the 1969 edition of the ABC Championship, the Rojas with the national team lost the title to South Korea settling for bronze.

== Death ==
Rojas died on January 30, 2018. He has been ill for the last few years of his life. Rojas' wake was hosted in Imus, Cebu City.
