= 1979 Royal Tru-Orange season =

- Head coach: Edgardo Ocampo
- Owner: San Miguel Corporation

All Filipino Conference results
- Record: 6–10 (37.5%)
- Place: N/A
- Playoff finish: N/A

Open Conference results
- Record: 21–5 (80.8%)
- Place: 1st
- Playoff finish: Champions

Invitational Conference results
- Record: 1–4 (20%)
- Place: 6th
- Playoff finish: N/A

Royal Tru-Orange seasons

The 1979 Royal Tru-Orange season was the 5th season of the franchise in the Philippine Basketball Association (PBA).

== Transactions ==
ADDITIONS
Ramon Dizon, Danilo Salvador & Evalson Valencia ^{Rookies signed}

== Championship ==
In the Second (Open) Conference, the Orangemen signed 6-7 Larry Pounds, a fifth-round draftee of the Golden State Warriors in 1975, and 6-11 Otto Moore, a veteran of NBA wars for nine seasons, as their imports. Royal emerge on top of the standings after the two-round eliminations with 13 wins and 3 losses and made it to the championship round by posting a 5-1 won-loss slate in the semifinals. On October 23, RTO defeated Crispa, 110–102, to reach the PBA finals for the first time in franchise history.

On November 6, Royal Tru-Orange won their first PBA crown by defeating the Toyota Tamaraws, 102–101, rookie Ramon Dizon was the spark that ignited veterans on the team (Photographed here) Game 4 of the title playoffs for a 3–1 series victory. The Orangemen took the first two games, 104–99 and 100–95, the Tamaraws avoided a sweep by winning the third game, 99–98.

Royal Tru-Orange joins U/Tex Wranglers as the only other ballclub not named Crispa or Toyota, to have won a PBA title in the 1970s as RTO mentor and former olympian Edgardo Ocampo won his first championship as a head coach.

== Roster ==
1979 Royal Tru-Orange roster
Players

| Pos. | # | POB | Name | Height | Weight | DOB (YYYY–MM–DD) | From |
|---|---|---|---|---|---|---|---|
| G/F | 2 | (Philippines) | Maximino Baguio | 6 ft 0 in (1.83 m) | | | Cebu Tech |
| G | 4 | (Philippines) | Paulino Velasco | 5 ft 9 in (1.75 m) | | | Visayas |
| F/C | 5 | (Philippines) | Jesus Migalbin | 6 ft 3 in (1.91 m) | | | San Agustin |
| F | 6 | (Philippines) | Ricardo dela Peña | 6 ft 0 in (1.83 m) |
| G | 7 | (Philippines) | Antonio Torrente | 6 ft 1 in (1.85 m) |
| G | 8 | (Philippines) | Ramon Dizon | 6 ft 0 in (1.83 m) | | | PSBA |
| F | 12 | (Philippines) | Marlowe Jacutin | 6 ft 0 in (1.83 m) | | | Visayas |
| F | 13 | (Philippines) | Teodulfo Gregorio | 6 ft 3 in (1.91 m) | | | Mapúa |
| G | 14 | (Philippines) | Yoyong Martirez | 5 ft 8 in (1.73 m) | | | Southwestern-U |
| F/C | 15 | (Philippines) | Rodolfo Lalota | 6 ft 3 in (1.91 m) | | | Mapúa |
| G | 16 | (Philippines) | Leonardo Paguntalan | 6 ft 1 in (1.85 m) | | | Western Institute |
| F | 17 | (Philippines) | Evalson Valencia | 6 ft 1 in (1.85 m) | | | Western Institute |
| G | | (Philippines) | Danilo Salvador | 5 ft 9 in (1.75 m) | | | San Sebastian |
| F/C | | (Philippines) | Marte Samson | 6 ft 1 in (1.85 m) | | | Ateneo |
| F | 25 | (United States) | Larry Pounds (I) | 6 ft 7 in (2.01 m) | | | Washington |
| C | 34 | (United States) | Otto Moore (I) | 6 ft 10 in (2.08 m) | | | Texas |

Coaches

Head coach

- (Philippines) Edgardo Ocampo

Assistant coach(es)

Legend

- (C) Team captain
- (I) Import
- Injured
