= Hechanova =

Hechanova is a surname. Notable people with the surname include:

- Cecil Hechanova (1932/1933–2016), chairman of the Philippine Sports Commission
- Rafael Hechanova (1928–2021), Filipino basketball player, brother of Cecil
