= Basketball in the Philippines =

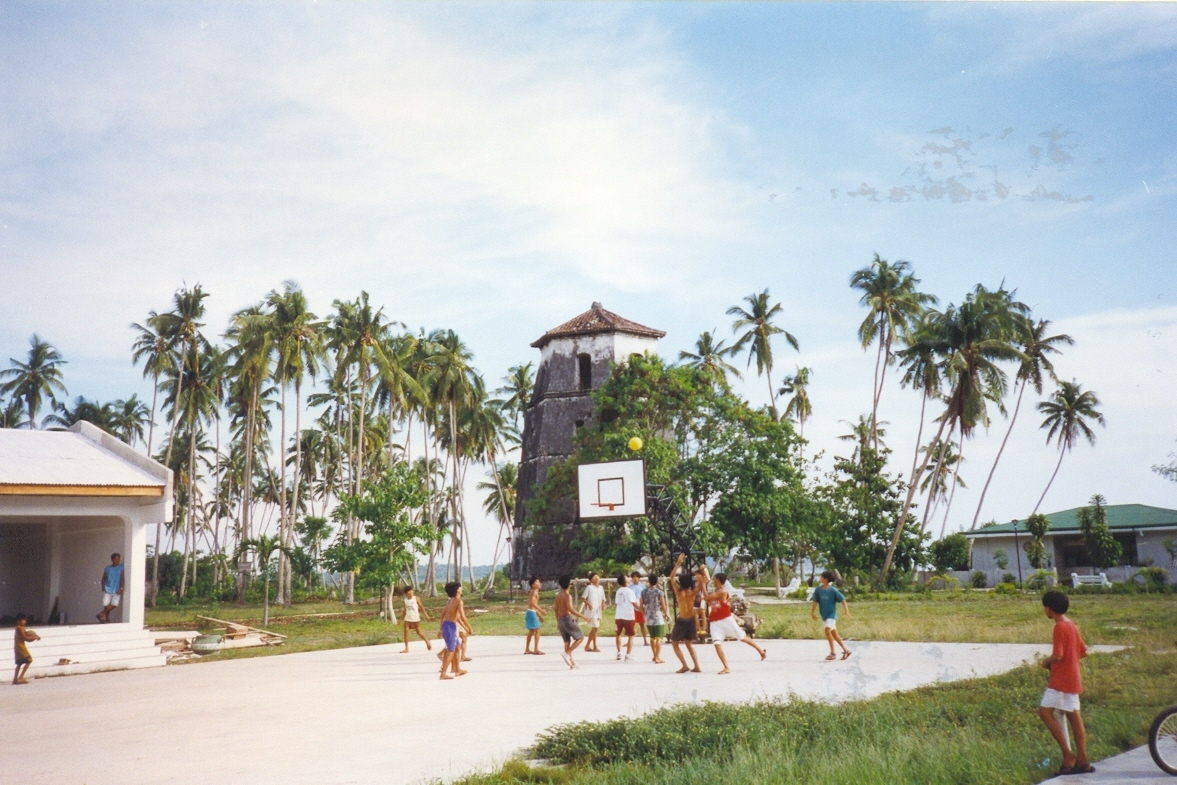
Children playing basketball in a rural area

Basketball is the most popular sport in the Philippines, played from amateur to professional levels.

== History ==
=== American era and the Philippine NCAA ===
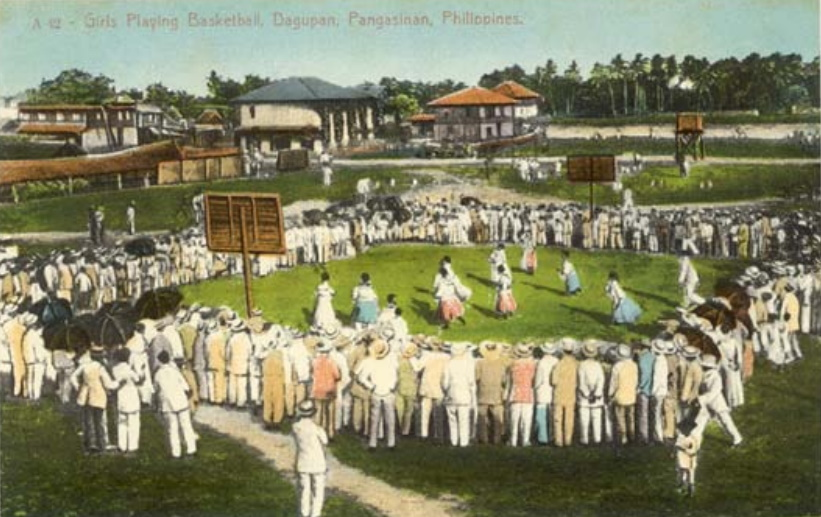
Postcard of women playing basketball in Dagupan, 1910

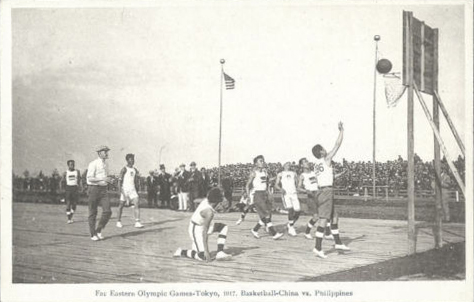
The national team playing against China at the 1917 Far Eastern Games in Tokyo

Basketball was introduced in the Philippines during the American colonial period with the first American teachers teaching the sport along with baseball through the YMCA and the school system. Basketball was first introduced to the Philippine public school system by the Americans as a women's sport in 1910 and was played in Interscholastic meets in 1911 until 1913. Women's basketball met opposition from conservative groups, particularly the Catholic Church who view bloomers worn by women basketball players as inappropriate. By the time skirts were allowed to be worn above bloomers as a compromise, women's basketball was already in decline and was only played in provincial and local interscholastic meets. Indoor softball and as well as volleyball became the more preferred sport for Filipino women.

The first men's national team – organized in the 1910s – won the first Far Eastern Championship Games in 1913. In all but one of the ten editions of the games, the national team won the gold medal.

The National Collegiate Athletic Association (NCAA), which had basketball as its main sport, was established in 1924.

=== FIBA beginnings, the MICAA, and international play ===
The Philippines became a member of FIBA through the Basketball Association of the Philippines in 1936. The Philippines made their debut in the Olympic Games in 1936 where they finished fifth, the best result of an Asian team in Olympic basketball history. In the same year, the first basketball stamp in the world was released by the country. The first commercial league was the basketball tournament of the Manila Industrial and Commercial Athletic Association (MICAA) which was established in 1938.

The Philippines became an independent country in 1946, and in the 1950s, the national team did well in international tournaments. The Philippine team won the gold medal at the Asian Games in 1951, the first-time basketball was played. The Philippine basketball team dominated the Asian Games until 1962.

After missing the first FIBA Basketball World Cup (known through 2010 as the FIBA World Championship) that was held in 1950 in Argentina, the Philippines participated in the 1954 FIBA World Championship held at Rio de Janeiro, Brazil. The Philippines finished with a 5–2 win–loss record in the Final Round games, and captured the bronze medal. The third place-finish is still currently the best finish by an Asian country in the World Cup. Carlos Loyzaga finished as the world tournament's third leading scorer (148 points/16.4 points per game) and was named in the FIBA World Mythical Five Selection.

In the 1960s, the first FIBA Asia Championship was won by the Philippines with Carlos Badion as the tournament's Most Valuable Player.

Meanwhile, the Philippines won the right to host the third FIBA World Championship, but were suspended after then-President Diosdado Macapagal, father of former President Gloria Macapagal Arroyo, refused to issue visas to players from communist countries (notably basketball powerhouse Yugoslavia and the Soviet Union).

The Philippines' dominance in sport waned after Carlos Loyzaga's retirement, and had performed poorly in the Olympic games where the national team was unable to break into top-10 positions. However, the country continued to play competitively in the Asian and World Championships.

=== The PBA, first World Cup hosting, and the end of the BAP era ===
The commercial league model pioneered by the MICAA continued with the Philippine Basketball Association (PBA) in 1975 and the Philippine Amateur Basketball League (PABL) in 1983. The PBA is the first professional basketball league in Asia and the second oldest in the world after the NBA. The league's regulations are a hybrid of rules from FIBA and the NBA. The league was inaugurated on April 9, 1975. The PABL was established to fill the void created after the collapse of the MICAA in 1981.

In 1978, the Philippines hosted the FIBA World Championship, marking the first time that the international tournament was held in Asia.

In 1992, a poll was conducted by Enervon C asking 62 basketball experts to list their top ten Filipino basketball players of all time, with first place being worth ten points and a decrease in one point for each succeeding place. Ranking first was Caloy Loyzaga, who received the most points with 603; in second place was Robert Jaworski with 458 points, while third place went to Ramon Fernandez with 332 points.

In 1998, the Metropolitan Basketball Association (MBA) was established. It was the first league in the Philippines to use a home-and-away format like most other sports leagues. The MBA, however, would cease operations in 2002.

The Philippines was suspended by FIBA in 2005 due to a leadership crisis which affected the former national basketball association of the country – the Basketball Association of the Philippines.

In 2027, the Philippines will host the FIBA Women’s Asia Cup, the premier continental basketball tournament for women in Asia. The International Basketball Federation’s (FIBA) Asia office awarded the hosting rights to the Samahang Basketbol ng Pilipinas (SBP) following a board meeting in June 2025, marking the first time the country will stage this event and the first continental FIBA tournament hosted in over a decade since the 2013 FIBA Asia Cup. Hosting is expected to boost the profile of women’s basketball locally and across the region amid growing momentum for the sport in the Philippines.

=== The SBP, second World Cup hosting, and further development ===
In 2007, the Samahang Basketbol ng Pilipinas became the newly recognized national basketball body for the Philippines by FIBA.

In 2009, Smart Gilas Pilipinas was officially launched to help the Philippines qualify for the 2012 London Olympics. They failed after finishing fourth in the 2011 FIBA Asia Championship. In 2013, the Philippines qualified for the 2014 FIBA World Cup with a second-place finish in the 2013 FIBA Asia Championship. That year also saw the boys' U-16 team qualify for the 2014 FIBA U-17 World Championship, and the boys' U-18 team winning the inaugural Fiba-Asia 3x3 U18 Championship. In 2015, the women's team was promoted to Level 1 after a win against India.

In 2017, the Maharlika Pilipinas Basketball League (MPBL) was inaugurated. The MPBL paved the way for future grassroots-level leagues in the future, including the National Basketball League (NBL) in 2018, Pilipinas VisMin Super Cup in 2021, and the Pilipinas Super League (PSL) in 2022. FilBasket was also established in 2021, which would go on to become AsiaBasket in 2023.

Heading into the 2020s, numerous Filipino basketball players play overseas in different leagues, with examples being Thirdy and Kiefer Ravena, Dwight Ramos and others in the Japanese B. League, Jack Animam in Serbia, and Kai Sotto in the Australian NBL and later the B. League. Sotto would go on to declare for the 2022 NBA draft but went undrafted, Sotto would be picked up by the Orlando Magic for the 2023 NBA Summer League. Players like Javi and Juan Gómez de Liaño, SJ Belangel, Carl Tamayo, JD Cagulangan and Kevin Quiambao have also since played in the Korean Basketball League.

Gilas Pilipinas went on to qualify for the 2019 FIBA Basketball World Cup and then the 2023 FIBA Basketball World Cup, the latter marks the Philippines' second hosting of the event, this time co-hosting with Japan and Indonesia.

in 2026, Jordan Clarkson of New York Knicks and Dlyan Harper of San Anontio Spurps made history at 2026 NBA Finals

== National teams ==
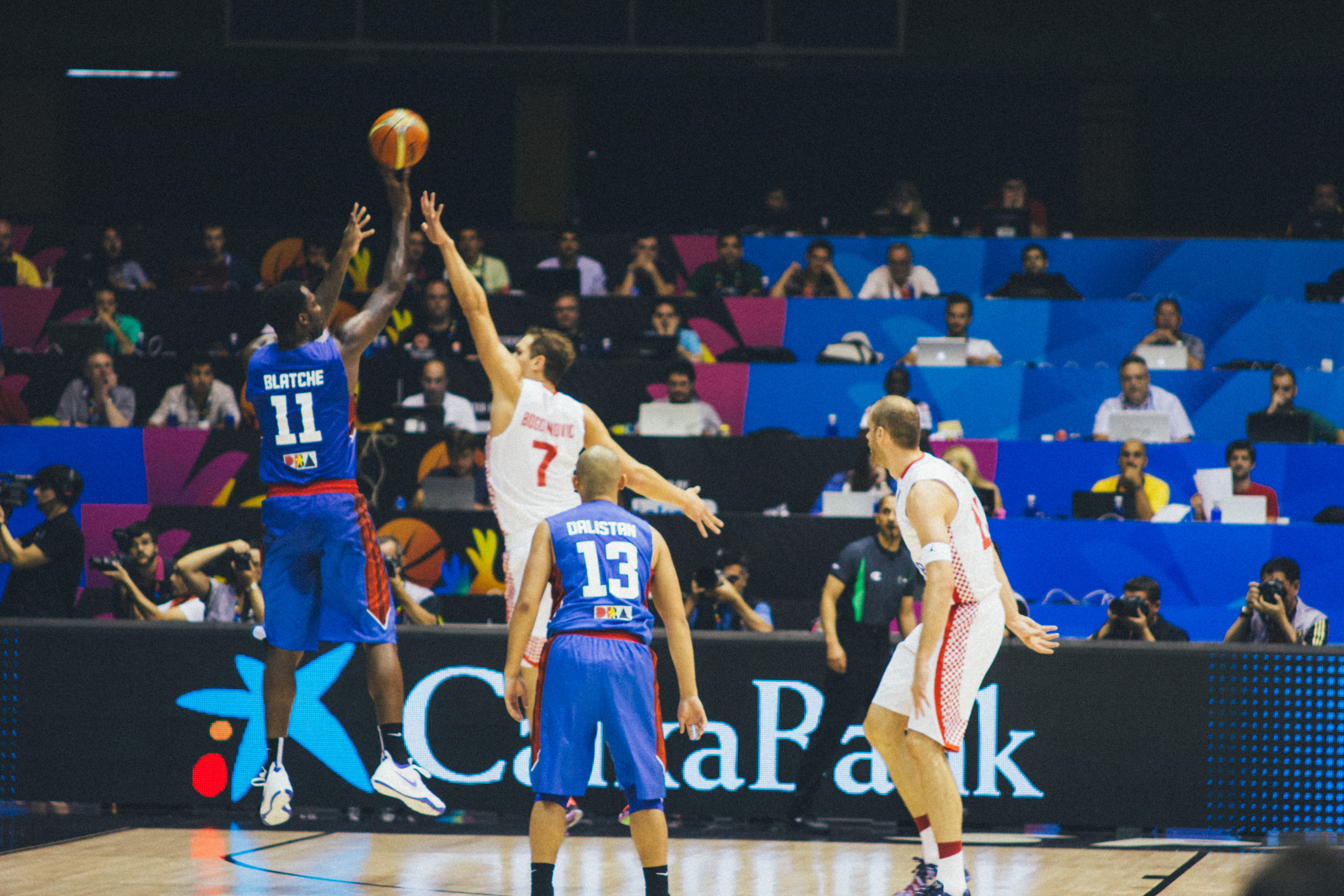
The men's national team (blue) playing against Croatia (white) at the 2014 FIBA World Cup

Senior

- Men's (in FIBA club tournaments)
- Women's
- Men's 3x3
- Women's 3x3
- Men's wheelchair

Youth

- Boys' under-19
- Girls' under-19
- Boys' under-17
- Girls' under-17
- Universiade

== Most notable leagues ==
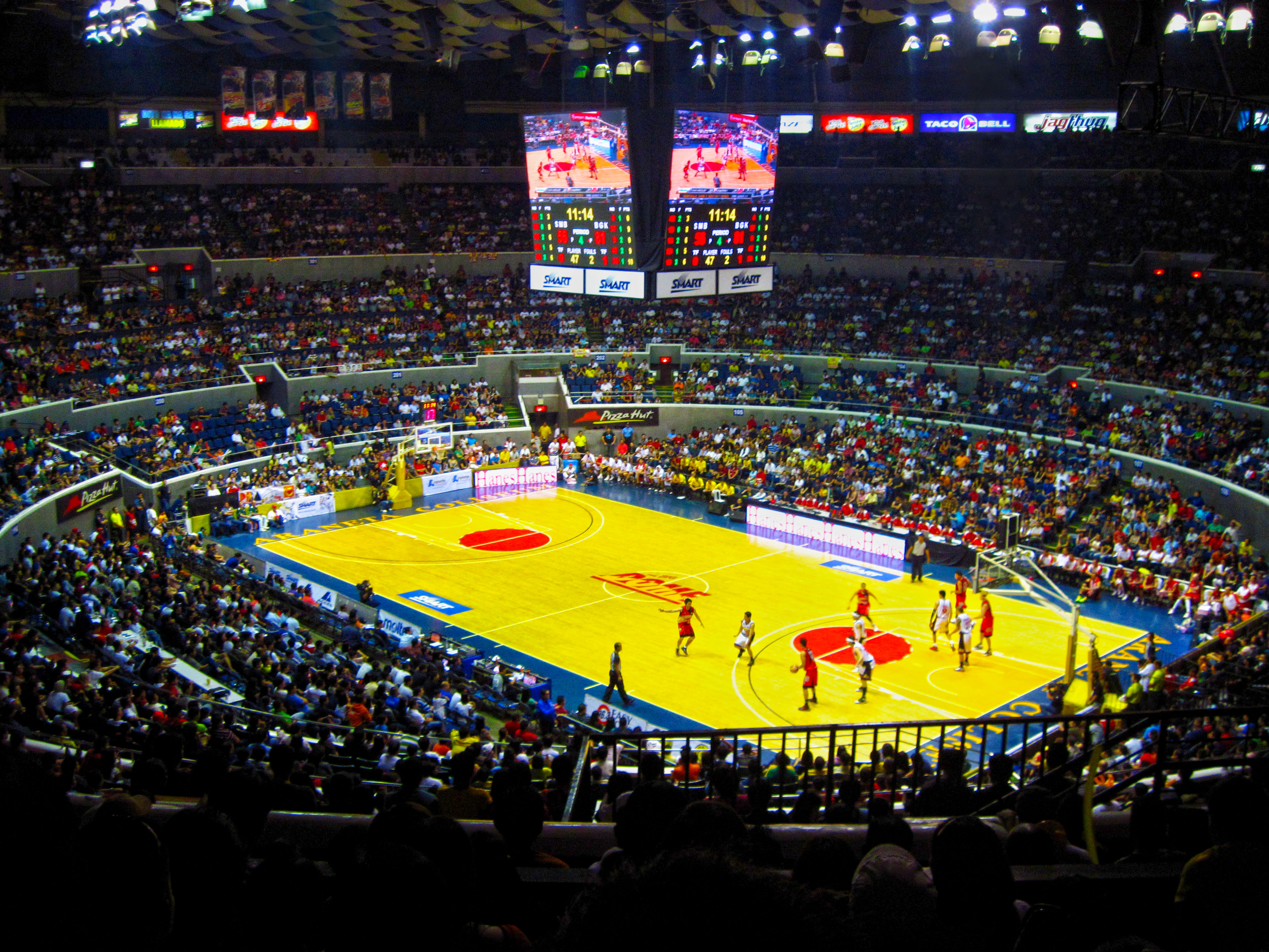
PBA game in the Araneta Coliseum

=== Men's ===
Professional

- Philippine Basketball Association (since 1975)
- Maharlika Pilipinas Basketball League (since 2018, professional since 2021)
- National Basketball League (since 2018, professional since 2020)
- Pilipinas Super League (PSL) (since 2022)
- AsiaBasket (since 2021; professional since 2022)

Amateur

- Pinoyliga (since 2017)
- Sinag Liga Asya (Institutional, since 2023)

Collegiate

- NCAA Basketball Championship (since 1924)
- UAAP Basketball Championship (since 1938)
- Cebu Schools Athletic Foundation, Inc. (since 2001)
- National Athletic Association of Schools, Colleges and Universities (since 2001)
- National Capital Region Athletic Association (since 1993)
- Filoil EcoOil Preseason Cup (since 2006)
- Universities and Colleges Athletic League (since 2016)
- U-Belt Collegiate Invitational (since 2025)

Secondary (High School)

- UAAP Juniors Basketball Championship
- NCAA (Philippines) Juniors Basketball Championship
- CESAFI Juniors Basketball Championship (since 2001)
- Philippine Secondary Schools Basketball Championship (since 2012)
- Philippine Ching Yuen Athletic Association (since 2013)
- Metro Manila Tiong Lian Basketball Association (1970–2013; 2025–present)
- NBTC League (2008–2019; 2022–present)

Exhibitional

- Fil-Chi Athletic Association
- UNTV Cup

Defunct

- Manila Industrial and Commercial Athletic Association (1938–1981)
- Philippine Basketball League (1983–2011)
- Metropolitan Basketball Association (1998–2002)
- Mindanao Visayas Basketball Association (2006–2008)
- United Regional Basketball League (2004–2005)
- National Basketball Conference (2004–2008)
- Liga Pilipinas (2008–2011)
- PBA D-League (2011–2024)
- Pilipinas Commercial Basketball League (2015–2016)
- Filsports Basketball Association (2015–2016)
- Community Basketball Association (CBA-Pilipinas) (2019)
- Father Martin Cup (1994-2019)
- Philippine Collegiate Champions League (2002-2020)
- Pilipinas VisMin Super Cup (2021–2023)

=== Women's ===
Professional

- Women's Maharlika Pilipinas Basketball League (since 2024, professional since 2025)

Collegiate

- UAAP Basketball Championship (since 1950)

Defunct

- Women's Philippine Basketball League (1998-1999, 2008)
- Pinay Ballers League (2014-2022)
- Women's National Basketball League (2019-2022)

=== 3x3 ===
- Chooks-to-Go Pilipinas 3x3 (2019-2023)
- PBA 3x3 (2021-2024)
- Women's PBA 3x3 (2015-2016, 2023-2024)

== See also ==
- List of Philippines men's national basketball team head coaches

== Publications ==
- XVII Intercontinental Cup – Girona/Barcelona 1985
- Bocobo, Christian and Celis, Beth, Legends and Heroes of Philippine Basketball, (Philippines, 2004)
- Dela Cruz, Juan, Book of Pinoy Facts and Records, (National Bookstore, Mandaluyong, Philippines, 2004)
- Philippine Basketball Association, The First 25 Years, (Philippines, 2000)
