= Mumar =

Mumar may refer to:

- Lauro Mumar (1924–1990), Filipino basketball player
- A rabbinical term for apostasy in Judaism
