= YCO Painters =

YCO Athletic Club
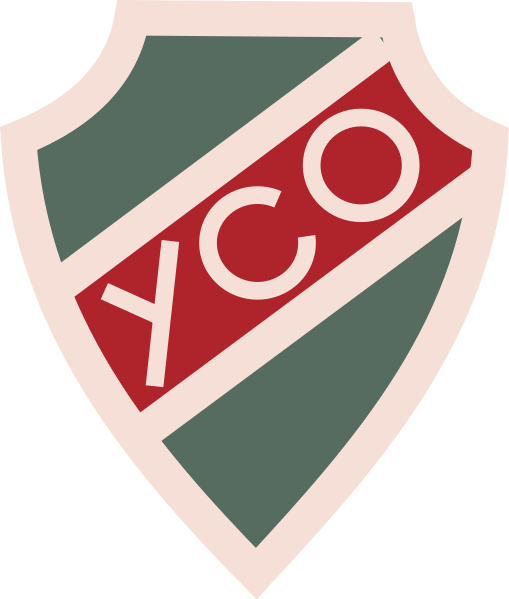
- Leagues: MICAA
- Founded: (late 1940s)
- History: late 1940s-1981
- Location: Philippines
- Team colors: Red, green and white
- President: Manuel “Manolo” Elizalde
- Head coach: Leo Prieto; Valentin "Tito" Eduque; Carlos Loyzaga; Felicisimo Fajardo; Loreto Carbonell; Ed Ocampo; Freddie Webb
- Championships: MICAA (partial list): 1954, 1956, 1957, 1960, 1963, 1975, 1979; National Open (partial list): 1954, 1955, 1956, 1957, 1958, 1959, 1960, 1967, 1977, 1978, 1979

The YCO Painters were the multi-titled Filipino basketball team of the YCO Athletic Club that was active from the late 1940s to 1981 in the now-defunct Manila Industrial and Commercial Athletic Association (MICAA). YCO Athletic Club was founded by businessman and sportsman Manuel “Manolo” Elizalde and owned under his company Elizalde & Co., Inc., manufacturers of YCO floor wax and paints.

The Painters were known as the first basketball dynasty in the Philippines, having dominated MICAA and BAP tournaments during the 1950s to early 1960s. The team's most famous player was Carlos Loyzaga, considered as the greatest Filipino basketball player of his time. It made basketball history by winning seven consecutive National Open championships (1954–1960), seven MICAA titles and the first grandslam in Philippine basketball (1954), when the Painters wrapped the National Open, MICAA and Challenge to Champions diadems, including winning 95 out of 109 games.

When Elizalde & Co., Inc. became one of nine companies that formed the professional Philippine Basketball Association (PBA) in 1975, the YCO franchise was retained in the amateur ranks and elevated most of its YCO players to their professional PBA franchise, named Tanduay.

The YCO franchise ended with the closure of the MICAA in 1982.

== Rivalry with Ysmael Steel Admirals ==
The Painters were best remembered for its rivalry with the Ysmael Steel Admirals from 1958 to 1967. The Painters and the Admirals would split the MICAA championships in the first four years of the 1960s playing against each other, The Painters won in 1960 and 1963 and the Admirals in 1961–1962.

During the 1961 MICAA finals, with the best-of-three series tied at 1-1, YCO defaulted the game for refusing to play in the final game at the Araneta Coliseum and the Admirals were declared champions.

The Admirals disbanded after winning the 1967 MICAA crown.

== Legacy ==
From 1986 to 1987, a new YCO franchise briefly emerged to play in the Phililippine Amateur Basketball League (PABL), called the YCO Shine Masters. The franchise was short-lived due to the financial difficulties faced by its parent, Elizalde & Co., Inc.

== Notable players ==
(A-F)

- Emilio Achacoso
- Sixto Agbay
- Cristino Arroyo
- Kurt Bachmann
- Carlos Badion
- Raymundo "Chuck" Barreiro
- Miguel Bilbao
- Jess Bito
- Ramoncito Bugia
- Ramon Campos, Jr.
- Rene Canent
- Ely Capacio
- Loreto Carbonell
- Orly Castelo
- Nathaniel Castillo
- Benjamin Cleofas
- Ricardo "Joy" Cleofas
- Joseph Conolly
- Dading Cuna
- Valentin "Tito" Eduque
- Armando Escober
- Pepe Esteva
- Adel D. Feliciano
- Danny Florencio

(G-L)

- Alberto Gagan
- Antonio Genato
- Edgardo "Egay" Gomez
- Gregorio Gozum
- Romulo Guille
- Rafael Hechanova
- Joseph Herrera
- Enrico Ilustre
- Robert Jaworski
- Bonifacio de Jesus
- Henry Kappert
- Jose Laganson
- Eduardo Lim
- Frankie Lim
- Roberto Littaua
- Carlos Loyzaga
- Chito Loyzaga
- Geronimo Lucido

(M-R)

- Alejandro Manansala
- Jaime Manansala
- Guillermo Manotoc
- Alex Marquez
- Amado Martelino
- Antonio "Pocholo" Martinez
- Jose Ma. Mendieta
- Abe Monzon
- Edgardo Ocampo
- Pablo Ocampo
- James Payne
- Rolando Pineda
- Renato Reyes
- Eduardo Rivera
- Edgardo Roque
- Roberto dela Rosa

(S-Z)

- Quirino Salazar
- Marte Samson
- Bruce Sanderson
- Valerio delos Santos
- Kurt Seeberger
- Cesar Sequera
- Alex Tan
- Elias Tolentino
- Mariano Tolentino
- Martin Urra
- Arturo Valenzona
- Gerardo Versoza
- Freddie Webb
- Francis Wilson
- Jose Yango
- Roberto Yburan

== See also ==
- Tanduay Rhum Makers
- YCO Shine Masters
