= Ysmael Steel Admirals =

- Leagues: MICAA
- Founded: 1958
- History: 1958-1968
- Location: Philippines
- President: Felipe “Baby” Ysmael, Jr.
- Head coach: Enrique Crame; Valentin "Tito" Eduque; Felicisimo Fajardo
- Championships: MICAA (6): 1958, 1961, 1962, 1965, 1966, 1967; National Open (6): 1961, 1962, 1963, 1964, 1965, 1966

The Ysmael Steel Admirals were a basketball team that became active in the Manila Industrial and Commercial Athletic Association (MICAA) from 1958 to 1968. It was best known for its rivalry with the YCO Painters. It won numerous titles in the National Open and the MICAA. The team was owned by the Ysmael Steel Manufacturing Company, the licensed manufacturer of Admiral home appliances in the Philippines during that period.

== National Open title ==
On January 28, 1961, Ysmael Steel ended YCO's seven-year reign in the National Open championships, winning 100–89, before 10,000 fans at the Rizal Memorial Coliseum, In that game, six Admirals scored in double figures, led by Alfonso Marquez with 22 points, Geronimo Cruz with 15, Cesar Jota with 13, and Narciso Bernardo, Cristobal Ramas and Edgardo Roque with 12 points apiece.

== MICAA title ==
Ysmael Steel retained the MICAA crown in 1962, winning over the Painters, 69–62, in the finals clincher on May 14. Top scorers were Narciso Bernardo and Eduardo Pacheco, the previous year, the Admirals won the title by default when YCO refused to play the third and final game at the Araneta Coliseum.

== Notable players ==
- Engracio Arazas
- Kurt Bachmann
- Orlando Bauzon
- Narciso Bernardo
- Nicolas Carranceja
- Eddie Cruz
- Geronimo Cruz
- Romy Díaz
- Felix Flores
- Manuel Jocson
- Cesar Jota
- Jaime Mariano
- Alfonso Marquez
- Roehl Nadurata
- Eduardo Pacheco
- Adriano Papa Jr.
- Cristobal Ramas
- Alberto Reynoso
- Eugenio Pohol Jr.
- Joaquin Rojas
- Edgardo Roque
- Serafin Vida
- Romeo Yanga
- Eliseo Mangubat

== Coaches ==
- Enrique Crame
- Valentin Eduque
- Felicisimo Fajardo
