= Lawrence Mumar =

Filipino deceased basketball player

Larry Mumar
Personal information
- Born: March 3, 1946
- Died: October 23, 2001 (aged 55)
- Listed height: 5 ft 11 in (1.80 m)
- Listed weight: 136 lb (62 kg)

Career information
- College: UST
- Position: Guard

Career history
- 1968–1971: Meralco Reddy Kilowatts
- 1972–1976: U/Tex
- 1976–1977: 7-Up Uncolas
- 1978–1979: Filmanbank Bankers
- 1980: CDCP
- 1981: Great Taste Coffee Makers

Career highlights
- 2x BAP Tournaments champion (1969 National Seniors, 1970 National Invitational); MICAA champion (1971 Open); UAAP senior' champion (1967)
Medals
Men's basketball
Representing Philippines
ABC Championship
Bronze medal – third place	1969 Bangkok	Team
Silver medal – second place	1971 Tokyo	Team

Lawrence "Larry" Mumar (March 3, 1946 – October 23, 2001) was a Filipino basketball player who was nicknamed "The Little Fox".

== Career ==
Son of former national team player and coach Lauro Mumar, Larry Mumar played for UST for college ball.

== Personal life ==
Mumar married Coney Reyes in 1973, but their marriage only lasted until 1983. They have two children: LA and Carla. LA is a former Ateneo Blue Eagle, and has served as the basketball coach of the Ateneo's women's team since 2020.
