= Filmanbank Bankers =

- Founded: 1978
- Dissolved: 1980
- Company: Filipinas Manufacturers Bank
- Head coach: Lauro Mumar
- Ownership: Ricardo Dante
- Championships: None; 1 Finals Appearances

The Filmanbank Bankers were a professional basketball team which played in the Philippine Basketball Association (PBA). Their franchise is owned by the Filipinas Manufacturers Bank (Filmanbank).

== History ==
In 1978, the Filipinas Manufacturers Bank (Filmanbank) of Ricardo Silverio purchased the franchise of a team branded after 7 Up in the adopting the Philippine Basketball Association (PBA). The 7-Up franchise was owned by the Seven-Up Bottling Company of the Philippines associated with the Syjuco group. It is the first-ever instance of a franchise being bought in the history of the PBA.

The new owners renamed the team "Filmanbank Bankers". Most of 7-Up's roster including its head coach Lauro Mumar was retained.

Mumar went on to lead the team in the finals of the 1978 PBA First Conference where it lost to its sister team, the Toyota Tamaraws.

After two seasons, the Filamnbank franchise was bought construction magnate Rodolfo Cuenca and was renamed the Galleon Shippers in 1980.

== Season-by-season records ==
Legend
Champion

Runner-up

Third place

Season	Conference	Finals
1978	All-Filipino Conference	Lost to Toyota Tamaraws
1978	Open Conference	
1978	Invitational Championship	
1979	All-Filipino Conference	
1979	Open Conference	
1979	Invitational Championship	

== Notable players ==
- Jacinto Chua
- Alfredo Enriquez
- Lawrence Mumar
- Jimmy Mariano
- Adriano Papa Jr.
