= Roberto Yburan =

Filipino basketball player

Personal information
- Born: June 7, 1935 Cebu City, Philippine Islands
- Died: unknown
- Listed height: 6 ft 0 in (183 cm)
- Listed weight: 180 lb (80 kg)

Career history
- Crispa Redmanizers
- YCO Painters
Medals
Men's basketball
Representing Philippines
ABC Championship
Gold medal – first place	1960 Manila	Team

Roberto Yburan (born June 7, 1935, date of death unknown) was a Filipino former basketball player who competed in the 1960 Summer Olympics.

During the early 1960s, Yburan saw action for Crispa Redmanizers and YCO Painters in the MICAA.
