= Valentin Eduque =

Filipino basketball player and coach

Valentín "Tito" M. Eduque
Personal information
- Born: August 26, 1927
- Died: November 8, 2001 (aged 74) Philippines

Career information
- High school: De La Salle (Manila)
- College: UST; De La Salle
- Playing career: 1946–1957
- Number: 3
- Coaching career: 1954–1986

Career history

Playing
- 1952–1957: YCO Painters

Coaching
- 1954–1957: YCO Painters (playing coach)
- ?–1968: Ysmael Steel Admirals
- 1964–1978: De La Salle
- 1968–1970: Meralco Reddy Kilowatts
- 1971–1972: Mariwasa-Akai
- 1973–1976: Concepcion Motorola / Carrier/Quasar (PBA)
- 1977: Mariwasa-Honda
- 1980–1981: Tanduay Rhum Masters
- 1983: Galerie Dominique
- 1986: Manila Beer Brewmasters

Career highlights
- Championships: (as coach, partial list) NCAA men’s basketball (2): De La Salle (2): 1971-1972; 1974-1975; Philippine men’s basketball team (2): 1958 Asian Games; FIBA Asia Championship (1973); BAP/MICAA/others (9): YCO Painters (7): 1954 National; 1954 MICAA; 1955 National; 1956 National; 1956 MICAA; 1957 National; 1957 MICAA; Meralco (1): 1969 National Seniors; Mariwasa-Akai (1): 1972 MICAA Open
Medals
Head coach for Philippines
ABC Championship
Gold medal – first place	1973 Manila	Team
Asian Games
Gold medal – first place	1958 Tokyo	Team

Valentín "Tito" M. Eduque (August 26, 1927 – November 8, 2001) was a Filipino basketball coach and player.

== Career ==
He was a member of the 1946 University of Santo Tomas varsity team, among his teammates were Ramon Campos, Jr., Primitivo Martinez, Julian Malonso and Dr. Jose Genato. The Glowing Goldies squad was undefeated in capturing the UAAP crown. Eduque also starred for La Salle and led the Archers to the 1947 NCAA title, his Archer teammates were Eddie Decena, Eddie Sharuff, Jose Mendieta, Jun Inigo, and Jess Pimentel.

Eduque saw action for the YCO Painters under coach Leo Prieto from 1952 to 1957 and then took over as playing coach. In 1964, he led the Philippines at Olympic qualifying tournament in Yokohama in 1964. He won the Asian Basketball Confederation (ABC) as the Philippines' coach in Manila in 1973.

Later known as "the man in white" for his penchant for wearing white clothing, Eduque was married to Inday Vargas, daughter of Jorge B. Vargas. He had five children with Inday. After the death of Inday, he later married Flor Valenzona, with whom he had three children.

In 2000, he was cited, along with coach Baby Dalupan for their contributions to basketball and were given Lifetime Achievement Awards by the National Basketball Hall of Fame whose Executive Director Jose Zubiri hosted the second enshrinement affair at the Peninsula Hotel in Makati.

== Death ==
Eduque died on November 8, 2001.

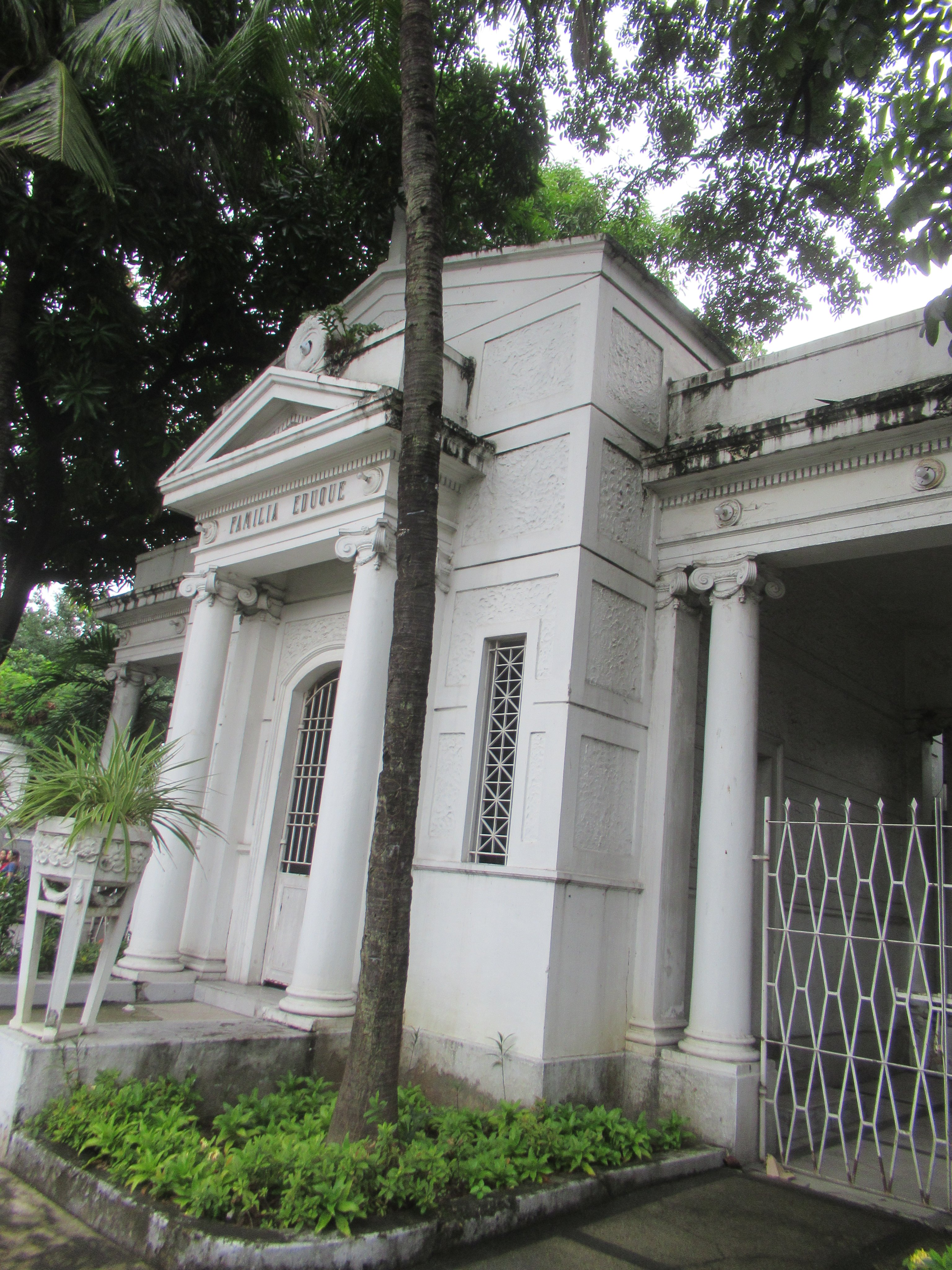
Familia Eduque Mausoleum, La Loma Cemetery

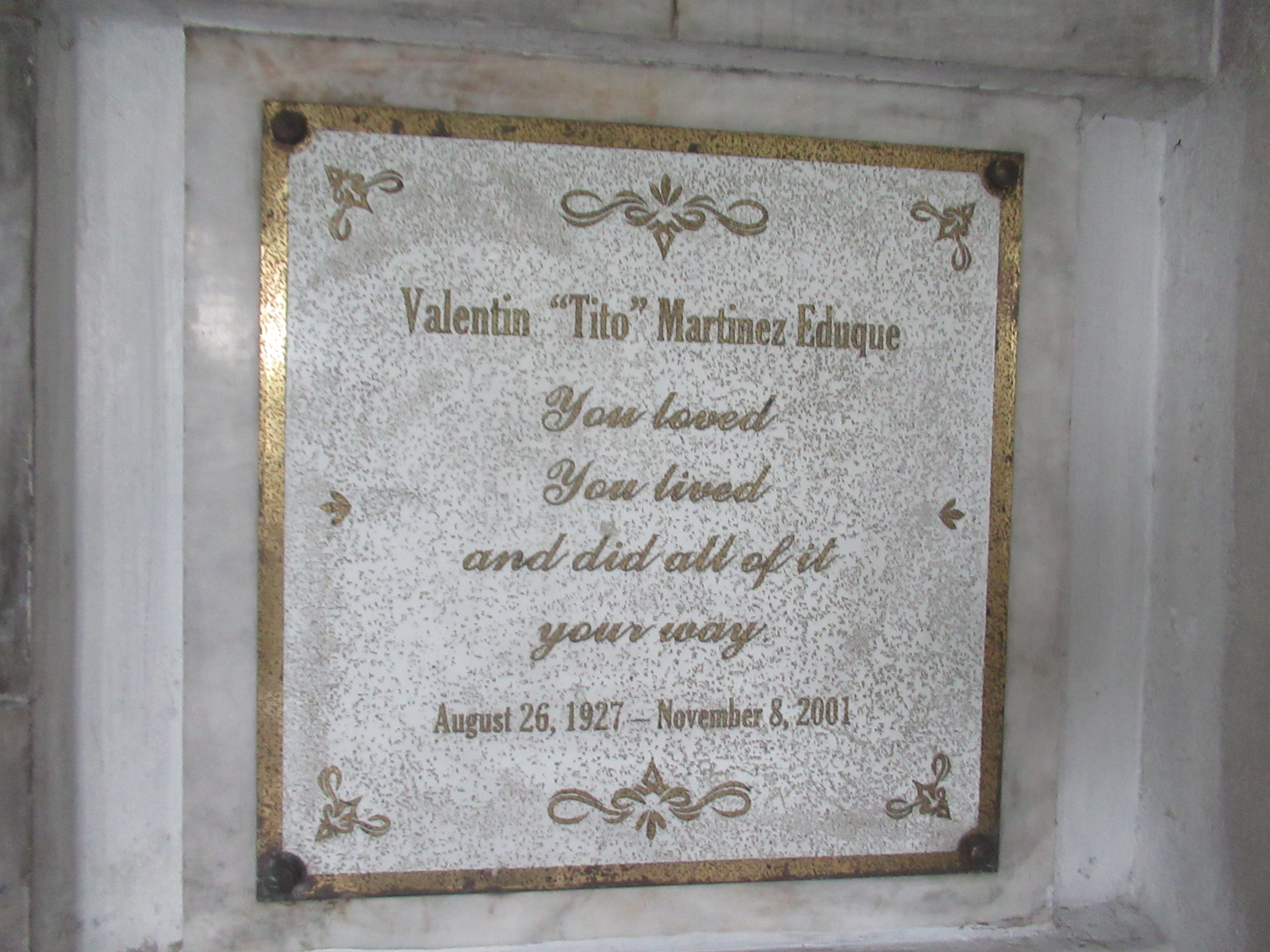
Eduque's tomb

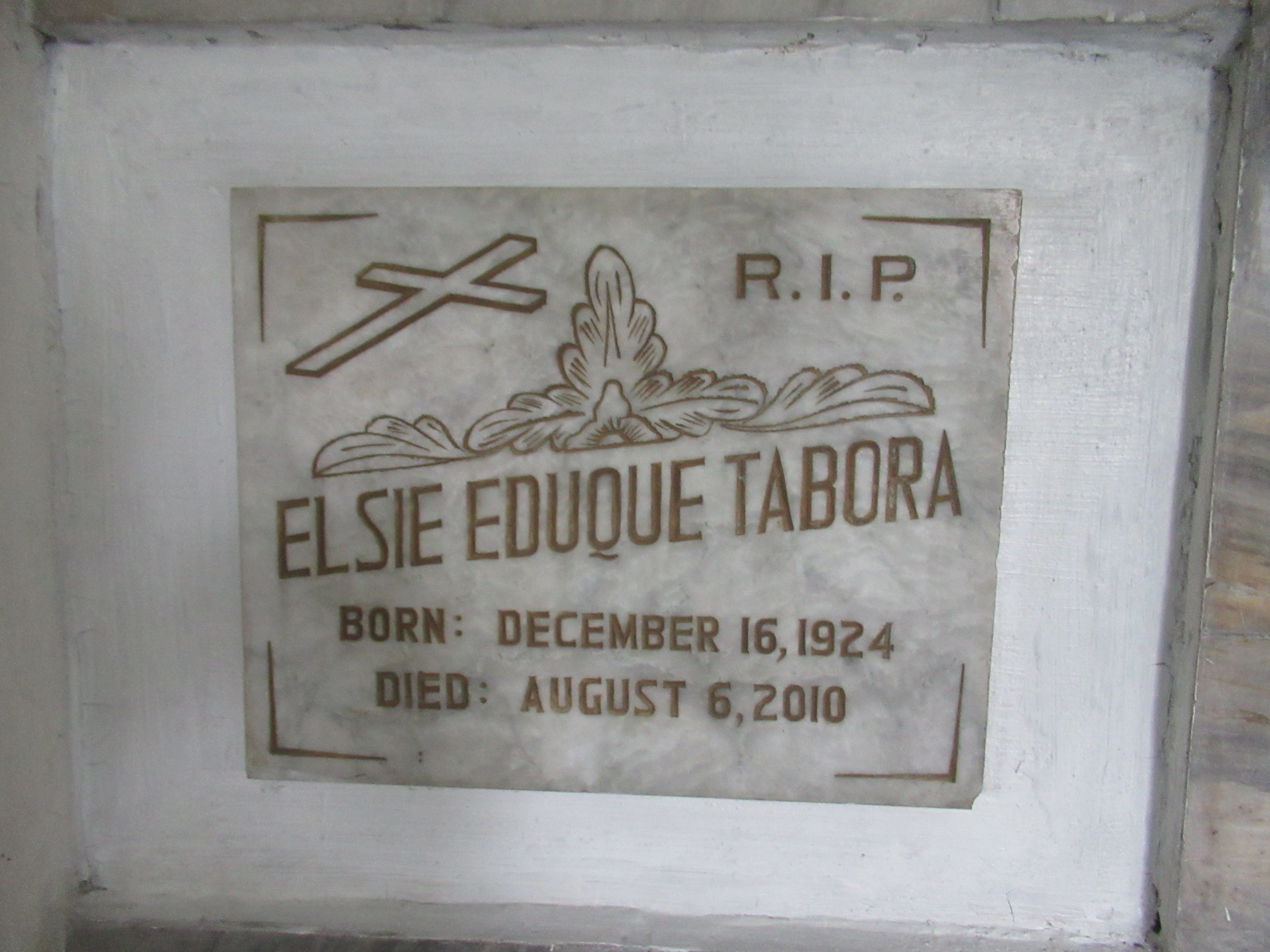
Elsie Tabora's tomb

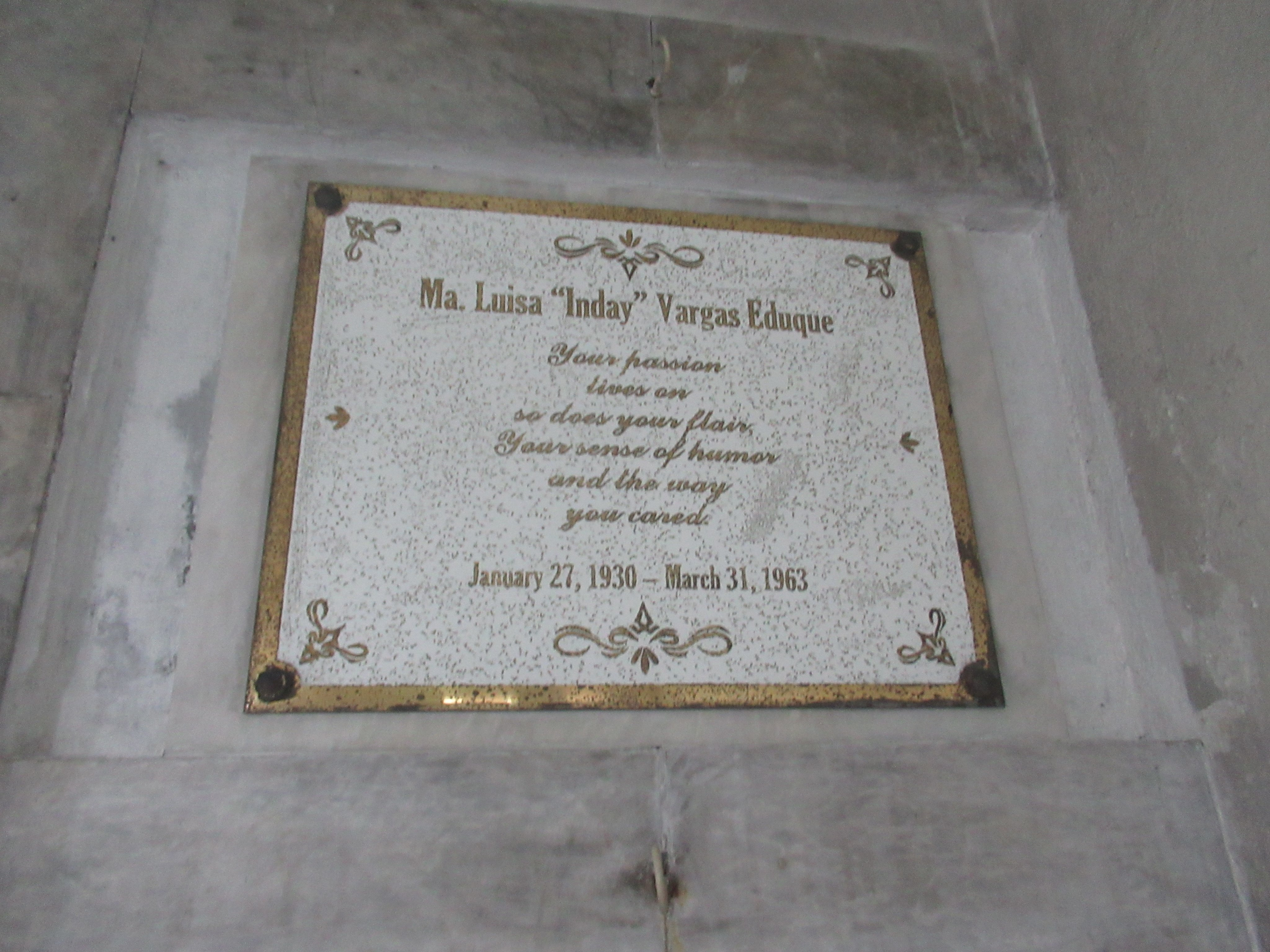
Maria Luisa Inday Vargas Eduque tomb

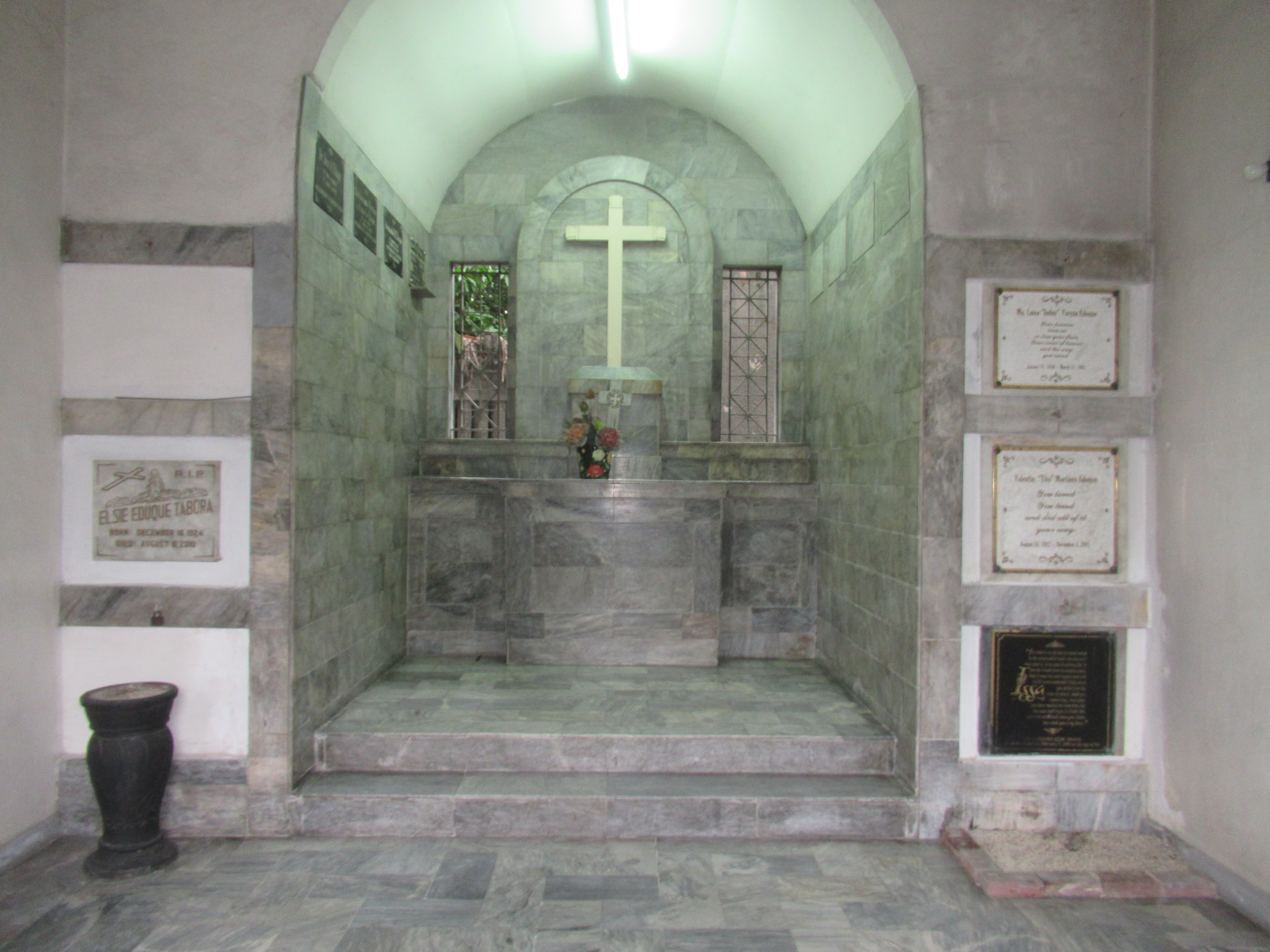
Family grave
