= Manila Industrial and Commercial Athletic Association =

Defunct semi-professional sports league in the Philippines

- Sport: Basketball and other sports
- Founded: 1938
- Folded: 1981
- No. of teams: varies
- Country: Philippines

The Manila Industrial and Commercial Athletic Association (MICAA) was a sports association which existed in Manila, Philippines from 1938 to 1981. Throughout its existence, it staged various sports and was participated by prominent Philippine companies.

After World War II, its basketball tournament became the country's premier basketball league until 1975, when nine of its members broke away to form the very first professional basketball league in Asia, the Philippine Basketball Association (PBA). Afterwards, it would continue as a farm league of sorts for the PBA until the league closed down before the end of 1981.

== MICAA basketball champions ==
- Old records says the pre-war MICAA champions were Heacock's (1938) and the Manila Ports Terminal (1939). The Terminal would win three straight titles a decade later from 1948–1950. The MICAA champion a year before (1947) was Olympic Sporting Goods.
- Philippine Airlines was the MICAA champion in 1951-52. In 1952, the Skymasters beat San Miguel Brewery for the title.
- PRISCO (Price Stabilization Corporation) became champions in 1953–54. The All-Stars defeated YCO Redshirts for the 1953 MICAA title.
- The YCO Redshirts won its first MICAA title in 1954 under coach Leo Prieto, winning against Republic Supermarket in the finale.
- In 1955, 7-UP Bottlers won their first championship on their maiden year, defeating San Miguel Brewery.
- YCO captured two titles in 1956-57. On July 27, 1957, the Redshirts beat 7-UP in the finale for their third championship in the last four years.
- The Ysmael Steel Admirals won the MICAA crown in 1958.
- In 1959, the Chelsea Clippers under coach Mateo Adao, defeated the YCO Painters to win their first championship.

1960s and the YCO-Ysmael rivalry:

- The YCO Painters and the Ysmael Steel Admirals battled against each other for cage supremacy in the 1960s era. YCO won over Ysmael in 1960, 1963 and 1964, while the Admirals defeated the Painters in 1961, winning the title by default after the Painters refuses to play in the third game of their best-of-three series. Ysmael repeated over YCO the following year in 1962 to retain the title.
- Ysmael regains the MICAA championship in 1965, defeating Floro Redmanizers. The Admirals beat old rival YCO Painters for the title in 1966 and won their third straight crown in 1967.
- In 1968, Mariwasa Akai won the crown, under coach Lauro Mumar, becoming the second team to win the title in their first season in the league. The following year in 1969, Mariwasa retains the MICAA crown.

Champions from 1970 to 1981:

- 1970: The Crispa-Floro Redmanizers dethroned Mariwasa in the finals. The Redmanizers won the National Open crown earlier in the year and in the MICAA tournament, went undefeated with a 13-game win streak to capture their first title.
- 1971 All-Filipino: The Redmanizers began a new rivalry with the Meralco Reddy Kilowatts, with coach Lauro Mumar moving from Mariwasa to Meralco and taking over from Tito Eduque. In the 1971 All-Filipino finals, Crispa-Floro won their third straight title, defeating San Miguel Braves.
- 1971 Open: On July 11, 1971, Meralco Reddy Kilowatts beats Crispa Redmanizers, 65-58, to rule the MICAA Open championship.
- 1972 Open: Mariwasa Akai won their third title in the last five years. The Recorders beat Crispa-Floro via two-game sweep in the championship series. Mariwasa coach Tito Eduque won his fourth MICAA title, first winning it with YCO in 1964 and with Ysmael in 1966-1967.
- 1972 All-Filipino: Crispa-Floro Redmanizers retains the All-Filipino crown, repeating over San Miguel Brewery in a finals rematch as the Braves just could not crack a MICAA title and were runner-up for the fourth time in their franchise history.
- 1973 All-Filipino: Mariwasa Akai wins the All-Filipino crown, defeating the highly-favored Crispa Redmanizers. The title series was best known for the "Crispa Six" scandal where six Redmanizers - Jun Papa, Danny Florencio, Rey Alcantara, Rudolf Kutch, Virgilio Abarrientos and Ernesto de Leon - admitted their participation in a gambling syndicate's bid to "manipulate" the result of the Mariwasa-Crispa MICAA finals.
- 1973: The Toyota Comets (coached by Nilo Verona), playing with the reinstated Robert Jaworski and Alberto "Big Boy" Reynoso, captured their first MICAA crown, winning over Concepcion Motorolas in "cinderella fashion". The Comets previously played as Komatsu Komets in the National Open and Panamin basketball tournament.
- 1974: The Crispa-Floro Redmanizers won their fourth MICAA title and regains the All-Filipino crown with a 2-0 series victory over defending champion Toyota Comets in their best-of-three playoffs. The Redmanizers clinched the title in Game two, 103-99 on October 15. Crispa-Floro was supposed to face U/Tex in the finals, but Toyota filed a protest that resulted to a scheduled replay. U/Tex refused to play and lost by forfeiture. This was the first-ever Crispa-Toyota finals meeting and the last MICAA championship before the professional Philippine Basketball Association was born.
- 1975: The YCO Painters, under coach Ed Ocampo, finally ended a long, title-drought, winning over Manilabank to capture the crown.
- 1976: Manilabank (coached by Honesto Mayoralgo) wins its first MICAA title, defeating the YCO Painters.
- 1977: Crown Motors (coached by Nat Canson) defeated Solid Mills for their first championship. ITM (coached by Nardo Marquicias) won the Invitational tournament, defeating Crown Motors.
- 1978: Solid Mills (coached by Arturo Valenzona) scored a 2-1 finals series victory over YCO Painters, winning the deciding third game for their first championship.
- 1979: YCO Painters (coached by Freddie Webb) defeated Frigidaire in the third and final game of their best-of-three series as the Painters were once again champions after a four-year title drought.
- 1980: Multi-titled coach Arturo Valenzona won another championship in leading the APCOR Financiers to a 2-1 series win over YCO Painters. APCOR became the fourth team to win the MICAA crown in its first participation in the league. APCOR repeated as champions in the season-ending invitational tournament, defeating Presto Fun Drinks.
- 1981: APCOR won their third MICAA title by defeating Crispa 400 in the first tournament of the year. The second conference which started in the first week of July, turn out to be the final MICAA tournament. APCOR defeated Jag Jeans on August 17, 1981, for their fourth title (sixth overall counting the National Open championships) to become the most dominant amateur ballclub at the start of the new decade and became the last MICAA basketball champions as the league folded up after failing to stage a tournament the following year.

== Basketball teams ==
Pre-PBA era (1938-1975):

- Caltex Oilers
- Consolidated Foods (CFC) / Litton Jeans / Great Taste / Presto Fun Drinks
- Chelsea Clippers
- Concepcion Motorola
- Crispa-Floro Redmanizers / Florotex / Crispa 400
- E.R. Squibb
- Grepa-Life Underwriters
- Heacock's Speed Merchants
- Jacinto Rubber
- Manila Ports Terminal / Philippine Ports Terminal
- Mariwasa Akai Recorders
- Maurice Enterprises
- Meralco Reddy Kilowatts
- NADECO (National Development Company)
- Olympic Sporting Goods
- PRATRA (Philippine Relief and Trade Rehabilitation Administration)
- PRISCO (Price Stabilization Corporation) - successor of PRATRA
- Philippine Airlines Skymasters/Viscounts
- Puyat Steel Sheetmakers / Manila Bank Golden Bankers
- Republic Super Market Greyhounds
- Sampaguita Pictures
- San Miguel Brewery/San Miguel Corporation
- Seven-Up Marauders/Uncolas
- Toyota Comets / Delta / Crown Motors / Frigidaire / MAN Diesel
- U-Tex Spinners/Weavers
- YCO Painters
- Yellow Taxi
- Ysmael Steel Admirals
- Yutivo Opel

New teams in the post-PBA era (1975-1981):

- APCOR Financiers
- Bax Jeans
- Filsyn
- Imperial Textile Mills (ITM)
- Jag Jeans
- L.R. Villar/A&W Records
- Romago Electric Co.
- Solid Mills / Solidenims
- St. George Whisky

== Notable basketball players ==
(A-K)

- Emilio Achacoso (YCO)
- Bogs Adornado (Crispa)
- Engracio Arazas (Ysmael, Meralco)
- Kurt Bachmann (Ysmael)
- Carlos Badion (YCO)
- Clemente Bargas (Ysmael)
- Rafael Barreto (San Miguel)
- Narciso Bernardo (Ysmael, Crispa)
- Ramoncito Campos (YCO)
- Loreto Carbonell (YCO)
- Orly Castelo (YCO)
- Benjamin Cleofas (YCO)
- Ricardo Cleofas (YCO)
- Eddie Cruz (Ysmael)
- Geronimo Cruz (Ysmael)
- Romeo Diaz (Crispa, Ysmael)
- Estoy Estrada (San Miguel)
- Danny Florencio (YCO, Crispa, U-Tex)
- Napoleon Flores (7-Up)
- Antonio Genato (YCO)
- Rafael Hechanova (YCO)
- Rudy Hines (Manilabank) - 1975 MVP
- Robert Jaworski (YCO, Meralco, Toyota)
- Fernando Abrilla (Concepcion)
- Bonifacio de Jesus (Manilabank, YCO)
- Manuel Jocson (Ysmael)
- Cesar Jota (Ysmael)
- Rudolf Kutch (Crispa)

(L-Z)

- Emerito Legaspi (Crown) - 1976 MVP
- Eduardo Lim (YCO)
- Bobby Littaua (YCO)
- Renato Lobo (Solidmills)
- Carlos Loyzaga (YCO)
- Julian A. Macoy (Yutivo)
- Rogelio Magale (7-Up)
- Eddie Marquicias (Heacocks)
- Alfonso Marquez (Ysmael, Mariwasa, Meralco, Concepcion)
- Alex Marquez (YCO) - 1980 MVP
- Yoyong Martirez (San Miguel)
- Rogelio "Tembong" Melencio (Yutivo, Concepcion)
- Lauro Mumar (PRISCO, Republic Supermarket, 7-Up)
- Roehl Nadurata (Ysmael, Crispa)
- Edgardo Ocampo (YCO)
- Constancio Ortiz Jr (Crispa)
- Eduardo Pacheco (Ysmael, YCO)
- Manny Paner (San Miguel)
- Adriano "Jun" Papa, Jr. (Ysmael, Crispa)
- Lou Pucillo (Chelsea)
- Rolando Pineda (Crown Motors, 1978 MVP)
- Cristobal Ramas (Ysmael, Crispa)
- Alberto Reynoso (Ysmael, Meralco, Toyota)
- Edgardo Roque (Ysmael, YCO)
- Joselino Roa (Yutivo Opel, San Miguel)
- Agapito Rogado (Mariwasa, Crispa)
- Agustin Salgado (PAL)
- Simon Pelagio (Crispa)
- Elias Tolentino (YCO)
- Mariano Tolentino (7-Up)
- Mario Uson (7-Up)
- Elpidio Villamin (Solidmills, APCOR) - 1979 MVP
- Freddie Webb (YCO)
- Roberto Yburan (Crispa, YCO)

== Coaches ==
Coach	Teams
Mateo Adao	Chelsea
Orly Bauzon	Bax Jeans
Narciso Bernardo	Crispa 400
Mon Cannu	Imperial Textile Mills
Nat Canson	Crown Motors/Frigidaire/MAN Diesel
Enrique Crame	Manila Yellow Taxicab / Ysmael Steel
Virgilio "Baby" Dalupan	Crispa-Floro
Boy de Vera	CFC
Valentin Eduque	YCO / Ysmael Steel / Mariwasa / Meralco
Felicisimo Fajardo	San Miguel Brewery / Ysmael Steel / Meralco / YCO
Gabriel Fajardo	PRISCO All-Stars
Freddie Gonzales	Solid Mills
Leonardo "Skip" Guinto	PAL Skymasters
Carlos Loyzaga	YCO
Danny Macahilig	7-Up Uncolas
Franco Marquicias	Heacock's Speed Merchants
Honesto Mayoralgo	ManilaBank
Lauro Mumar	Mariwasa AKAI / Meralco / U-Tex
Edgardo Ocampo	YCO
Leo Prieto	YCO
Filomeno "Pilo" Pumaren	Crispa 400
Ignacio "Ning" Ramos	San Miguel Brewery
Benet Salvador	San Miguel Corporation
Arturo Valenzona	Solid Mills / APCOR
Nilo Verona	Komatsu/Toyota
Nemie Villegas	A&W Records
Freddie Webb	YCO

== TV coverage ==
ABS TV-3 (now ABS-CBN) was the first network to cover the basketball games during the 1950s with Jake Romero as chief anchor of the coverage. During the 1960s, the basketball games were covered by MBC TV-11 with Willie Hernandez as chief anchor. Later on, other networks like ABC TV5, RBS TV-7 (now GMA Network), KBS TV-9 and IBC TV-13 would cover the basketball games.
