= Sony Hendrawan =

Former Indonesian basketball player

Personal information
- Born: 21 June 1943 (age 83) Semarang, Indonesia
- Listed height: 1.75 m (5 ft 9 in)
- Position: Small forward

Career history
- SAHABAT Semarang
- SAHABAT Surabaya
- Waringin Abadi

Career highlights
- IBL Legacy Award (2020); Indonesian League champion (1969); 2× pre-Olympic Top Scorer (1968, 1964); ABC Championship Most Valuable Player (1967); ABC Championship All-Star 5 (1967); ABC Championship Top Scorer (1967)
- FIBA Hall of Fame
Medals
Men's basketball
Representing Indonesia
GANEFO
Silver medal – second place	1963 Jakarta	Team
Silver medal – second place	1966 Phnom Penh	Team

Sony Hendrawan (born June 21, 1943) or his Chinese name Liem Tjien Siong, is an Indonesian former professional basketball player. In 2023, Hendrawan became the only Indonesian to be inducted into the FIBA Hall of Fame. The IBL Most Valuable Player reward was renamed after him in 2020.

== Professional career ==
Hendrawan is from Semarang, but started his professional career in Surabaya.

== National team career ==
In 1964, Hendrawan scored 43 points against South Korea in the 1964 pre-Olympic basketball tournament in Yokohama, Japan. In 1968, he represented Indonesia in the FIBA World Olympic Qualifying Tournament in Monterrey, Mexico.
