= Marte Samson =

Filipino basketball player

Personal information
- Born: July 22, 1951 (age 74)
- Listed height: 6 ft 1 in (185 cm)
- Listed weight: 179 lb (81 kg)

Career information
- College: Ateneo

Career history
- YCO Painters
Medals
Men's basketball
Representing Philippines
ABC Championship
Silver medal – second place	1971 Tokyo	Team

Marte Samson (born July 22, 1951) is a former Filipino basketball player. He played college ball for the Ateneo de Manila University, where he won a championship in 1969, before moving on to play basketball for the Elizalde & Co. team of the Manila Industrial and Commercial Athletic Association. Samson also appeared at the Olympic Games as a member of the country's national basketball team.
