= Ricardo Cleofas =

Filipino basketball player (born 1951)

Personal information
- Born: February 9, 1951 (age 75)
- Listed height: 5 ft 11 in (180 cm)
- Listed weight: 161 lb (73 kg)

Career information
- College: Ateneo

Career history
- YCO Painters
Medals
Men's basketball
Representing Philippines
ABC Championship
| Gold medal – first place | 1973 Manila | Team |

Ricardo "Joy" B. Cleofas (born February 9, 1951) is a Filipino retired basketball player.

Cleofas played college ball for the Ateneo de Manila University under coach Nilo Verona. He led Ateneo to a runner-up finish in his first year together with Marte Samson. The Blue Eagles became NCAA champions in 1969 and among his teammates were Samson, Chito Afable, Jun Ross and Francis Arnaiz. After college, he played in the Manila Industrial and Commercial Athletic Association for the YCO Painters. That same year, YCO garnered the National Seniors and Panamin tournament.

Cleofas represented the Philippines in the first Youth team in 1970 that won the first ABC Youth Tournament. Cleofas also appeared at the Olympic Games as a member of the Philippines men's national basketball team in the Munich Olympics. The 1973 Asian Basketball Confederation and the 1974 World Basketball Confederation in Puerto Rico. Joy entered the pro league in the Philippine Basketball Association as a pioneer, playing for Tanduay. As a player, he was known for his ability to shoot from great distances, his accurate passing, and his hustle.
