= Ed Ocampo =

Filipino basketball player (1938–1992)

- Born: Edgardo Luciano Ocampo; October 5, 1938; Magalang, Pampanga, Philippine Commonwealth
- Died: July 29, 1992 (aged 53); Philippines
- Height: 5 ft 9 in (1.75 m)
Association football career
International career
Years	Team	Apps	(Gls)
c. 1956	Philippines		
- Basketball career

Personal information
- Listed weight: 175 lb (79 kg)

Career information
- High school: Ateneo (Manila)
- College: Ateneo (1957–1959)
- Playing career: 1957–1974
- Number: 33, 8, 9
- Coaching career: 1975–1990

Career history

Playing
- 1960–1974: YCO Painters

Coaching
- 1975–1978: YCO Painters
- 1978–1980: Royal Tru-Orange
- 1981–1983: Toyota Superdiesels/Super Corollas
- 1985: Manila Beer Brewmasters
- 1986–1987: Pilipinas Shell Oilers/Shell Azocord Super Bugbusters
- 1990: Pepsi Hotshots

Career highlights
- As coach: MICAA Championships(1): YCO Painters (1): * 1975; PBA Championships (4): Royal Tru-Orange (1): * 1979 PBA Open; Toyota (3): * 1981 PBA Open * 1982 PBA Reinforced Filipino * 1982 PBA Open; Hall of Fame: * Ateneo Sports Hall of Fame (1982) * National Basketball Hall of Fame (1999) * PBA Hall of Fame (2013)
Medals
Men's basketball
Representing Philippines
ABC Championship
Gold medal – first place	1960 Manila	Team
Gold medal – first place	1963 Taipei	Team
Silver medal – second place	1965 Kuala Lumpur	Team
Gold medal – first place	1967 Seoul	Team

Edgardo Luciano Ocampo (October 5, 1938 – July 29, 1992) was a Filipino basketball player and coach.

== Early life and education ==
Ocampo was born in Pampanga, Philippines, on October 5 1938. He was one of four children of architects Fernando H. Ocampo and Lourdes Luciano. He received his education at the Ateneo de Manila (GS 1951, HS 1955, BSBA 1959).

== Playing career ==
=== Football ===
During his grade school years, Ocampo became interested in basketball and football. He tried joining the school basketball team but did not meet the requirements. Instead, he made it onto the football team. By the age of 17, Ocampo was acclaimed by sportswriters as "Mr. Football". He was a member of the Philippine football team that toured Korea and Spain in 1956.

=== Track and field ===
He was active in track and field during his school years in events like shot put (12lbs & 6kg) and long jump.

=== Basketball ===
In 1956, Ocampo broke his clavicle during a football game and was advised by doctors to cease sports for six months. While recuperating, Ocampo decided to join the school's basketball team. Ocampo officially joined the team during the second round of the 1957 NCAA basketball season. He led the team to back-to-back NCAA men's basketball championships in 1957 and 1958. Ocampo became the first team captain to be called King Eagle.

After graduation in 1959, he joined the YCO Painters in the Manila Industrial and Commercial Athletic Association. He was part of the YCO championship teams of the 1960s and remained with the franchise until 1973/1974.

==== Philippine men's basketball team ====
Ocampo was a regular member of the Philippines men's national basketball team from 1959 to 1972. He first joined the Philippine team that placed 8th at the 1959 FIBA World Championship held in Chile and was a member of three Philippine teams that won the Asian Basketball Confederation championships (1960, 1963, and 1967). He was also a three-time Olympian: 1960 (11th place), 1968 (13th place), and 1972 (13th place).

Ocampo was mentioned in Jose Ma. Bonifacio Escoda's book, Basketball History: Philippines, as "one of the finest guards the country has ever produced and a gentleman in and outside the hard court."

== Coaching career ==
Ocampo began his coaching career with the YCO Painters in 1975, winning the MICAA championship that year against Manila Bank in July.

He became head coach of Royal Tru-Orange in the Philippine Basketball Association in 1978 and won his first PBA championship during the 1979 PBA Open conference. This was the first PBA championship won by the San Miguel Corporation franchise, which is now currently the franchise holding the most PBA championships (25).

In 1981, Ocampo became head coach of Toyota and won three more PBA championships. He later coached Manila Beer (1985), Shell (1986-1987), and Pepsi (1990).

== Personal life ==
Ocampo was married to the former Maria Lourdes Trinidad.

== Death ==
Ocampo died on July 29, 1992 at the age of 53 in Manila, Philippines.

== Honors ==
- Ateneo Sports Hall of Fame (1982)
- National Basketball Hall of Fame (1999)
- PBA Hall of Fame (2013)
