= Jimmy Mariano =

Filipino basketball player and coach (1941–2025)

Personal information
- Born: April 19, 1941 Malabon, Rizal, Philippine Commonwealth
- Died: December 7, 2025 (aged 84)
- Listed height: 6 ft 4 in (193 cm)
- Listed weight: 165 lb (75 kg)

Career information
- College: UE
- Playing career: 1965–1978
- Position: Power Forward

Career history

Playing
- 1965–1967: Ysmael Steel Admirals
- 1971: Meralco Reddy Kilowatts
- 1972: Concepcion Motorola
- 1975: Concepcion Carrier
- 1976: Quasar TV Makers / Fiberlite Fiberglass Makers
- 1976–1977: 7-Up
- 1978: Filmanbank Bankers

Coaching
- 1983: Great Taste Coffee Makers
- 1984–1985: UE
- 1985–1989: Oman
- 1989–1990: Presto Tivolis
- 1995–199?: Red Bull / Agfa
- 1998–1999: UE
- 1999–2000: ANA Water Dispenser
- 2000–200?: Surigao Warriors
- 2002–2003: PCU
- 2005: PSBA
- 2007–2010: St. Clare Caloocan

Career highlights
- As player: 2× UAAP men's champion (1960, 1962); 4× MICAA champion (1965–67, 1971 Open); As head coach: PBA champion (1990 All-Filipino); 2× UAAP men's champion (1984, 1985)
Medals
Men's basketball
Representing Philippines
ABC Championship
| Silver medal – second place | 1965 Kuala Lumpur | Team |
| Gold medal – first place | 1967 Seoul | Team |
| Bronze medal – third place | 1969 Bangkok | Team |
| Gold medal – first place | 1973 Manila | Team |

Jaime "Jimmy" L. Mariano (April 19, 1941 – December 7, 2025), also known by his moniker Mr. Cool, was a Filipino basketball player and coach. As a player, he played for the Philippines men's national basketball team in the 1968 and 1972 Summer Olympics. As coach he coached the UE Red Warriors to the 1984 and 1985 UAAP championships, and the Presto Tivolis win the 1990 PBA All-Filipino Conference.

== Playing career ==
=== College ===
Mariano played for the UE Red Warriors in the 1960s under Baby Dalupan, winning two University Athletic Association of the Philippines (UAAP) titles. That UE team was coached by Baby Dalupan.

=== Club ===
Mariano played Manila Industrial and Commercial Athletic Association (MICAA). He played for teams like for Ysmael Steel Admirals, Meralco Reddy Kilowatts and Concepcion Carrier from 1965 to 1972. He is a 4 time MICAA champion, with one of his titles being the 1971 championship won with Meralco.

He also played in the Philippine Basketball Association (PBA) from 1975 to 1979. Carrier joined the inaugural season of the PBA before Mariano played for the original 7-Up franchise. Mariano became part of the Filmanbank Bankers after the company behind the brand bought the 7-Up franchise in 1978.

=== National team ===
Mariano played for the Philippine national basketball team. He was part of the Philippines' roster for the 1966 Asian Games in Bangkok.

Mariano also appeared at the Olympic Games. He was part of the Philippines team which played in the 1968 edition in Mexico City. Mariano was the flag bearer for the Philippines at the 1972 Games in Munich, Germany. He helped the national team win the 1973 ABC Championship (now the FIBA Asia Cup).

Mariano was the team captain of the national basketball team in the 1974 FIBA World Cup.

== Coaching career ==
Mariano began his coaching career with Presto Tivolis in the PBA. He was removed from his role after admitting he "did not intend to win" in a game against Crispa in one of the conferences of the 1983 season. He was replaced by Baby Dalupan. The next year, Mariano became the head coach of the University of the East (UE) Red Warriors, earning them two titles in the UAAP Championships in Season 47 and 48. From 1985 to 1989, Mariano was coach of the Oman national team.

Ahead of the 1989 PBA Reinforced Conference, Mariano returned to Presto in August of that year and led the team to the 1990 All-Filipino championship, his only PBA title. He returned to Oman to take a role as a sports development consultant with Dalupan taking over once again as Presto coach. Mariano returned to the Philippines after three years.

Mariano took on various positions around 1995, including at Xavier School and Red Bull in the Philippine Basketball League (PBL). Red Bull, which was briefly known as the Agfa Film Experts, won the 1996 All-Filipino Championships beating Stag Pale Pinsen in the finals and finished sixth place at the 1996 William Jones Cup in Taiwan.

In 1998, Mariano replaced Francis Rodriguez as coach of the UE Warriors. His second stint with UE lasted until Season 62 (1999), and was replaced by Angelito Esguerra in January 2000 ahead of Season 63 (2000). He joined Ana Water Dispenser of the PBL, leading the new team to a second place finish at the PBL Challenge Cup in February 2000. In the same year, Mariano joined the Surigao Warriors of the Metropolitan Basketball Association.

Mariano then coached the PCU Dolphins in the National Collegiate Athletic Association (NCAA). He left the team after finishing eighth and last in Season 79 in 2003. Mariano presided in the try-outs of PCU players Gabby Espinas, Jayson Castro and Beau Belga; the Dolphins would win the title in 2004 under Ato Tolentino.

Mariano was appointed coach of the Philippine School of Business Administration (PSBA)–Quezon City Jaguars in April 2005 after a one year hiatus. His stint with the PSBA ended just five months later in September 2005. By 2007, Mariano was with the St. Clare Saints of the National Athletic Association of Schools, Colleges and Universities. Mariano was then later elevated by St. Clare as its athletic director in 2011. By 2014, he was handling the Cainta Catholic College high school varsity team and said that he was no longer interested in returning as a head coach for UE.

== Personal life and death ==
Mariano was born on April 19, 1941. His hometown was Malabon.

He was honored by the Samahang Basketbol ng Pilipinas during the fifth window of 2019 FIBA Basketball World Cup qualifiers in 2018. In August 2025, he was honored as the coach of the last UE team that won the UAAP title in 1985.

Mariano died on December 7, 2025, at the age of 84.
