= LA Mumar =

Filipino basketball coach

Personal information
- Born: March 20, 1980 (age 46)

Career information
- College: Ateneo
- Coaching career: 2015–present

Career history

Coaching
- 2015–2019: Lyceum HS
- 2020–2025: Ateneo (women)

Lawrence Anthony "L.A." Nubla Mumar (born March 20, 1980) is a Filipino basketball coach and currently serves as the head coach of the Ateneo Blue Eagles women's basketball team since 2020.

== Career ==
=== Playing ===
From 1996 until 2000, Mumar played for the Ateneo Blue Eagles, serving as back-up point guard.

=== Coaching and team directorship ===
Mumar became coach of Lyceum Junior Pirates until 2019.

He later served as Ateneo's assistant to the athletic director. He later became the head coach of the Lady Eagles. He served until 2025.

=== League official ===
Mumar formerly served as the Tournament Director for the UAAP Season 82 Collegiate Basketball Tournament.

== Personal life ==
He is the son of TV actress and host Coney Reyes and basketball player Larry Mumar, grandson of Lauro Mumar (also a basketball player) and half-brother of Pasig City Mayor Vico Sotto.

LA Mumar graduated with Bachelor of Arts degree in Development Studies, and also works as a motivational speaker.

He has three sons (Lorenzo, Mateo, and Alejandro) with wife Macy.
