= Honesto Mayoralgo =

Filipino basketball player and coach

Personal information
- Born: August 5, 1934
- Died: August 17, 1985 (aged 51)

Career information
- High school: Ateneo (Manila)
- College: Ateneo

Career history

Playing
- 1955: 7-Up Uncolas

Coaching
- 1975–1977: Philippines

Career highlights
- As head coach: NCAA champion (1953); As player: MICAA champion (1955)
Medals
Men's basketball
Representing Philippines
SEA Games
Gold medal – first place	1977 Kuala Lumpur	Team

Honesto Mayoralgo (August 5, 1934 – August 17, 1985) was a former Filipino basketball player and coach.

== Basketball career ==
Nes or Mayo, as his friends called him, was one of the more popular Ateneo Blue Eagles from high school in 1949 through college in 1955 and was a standout member of the Ateneo NCAA champion team in 1953. Mayoralgo also played for the Seven-Up team that won the 1955 MICAA championship. After his active playing days, Nes turned to coaching and steered the Philippine Youth quintet to the 1977 Asian Youth championship held in Kuwait. He was coach of the Manilabank team in the MICAA for several years.

Until the time of his death nine days after his 51st birthday, Mayoralgo was the Basketball Association of the Philippines' vice-president for operations. Prior to this, he served as technical assistant to the BAP president and was the BAP secretary-general.
