= Jun Papa =

Filipino basketball player

Personal information
- Born: July 14, 1945
- Died: October 27, 2005 (aged 60) Parañaque, Philippines
- Listed height: 5 ft 11 in (180 cm)
- Listed weight: 165 lb (75 kg)

Career information
- College: NU

Career history
- Ysmael Steel Admirals
- Crispa-Floro Redmanizers
- Mariwasa
Medals
Men's basketball
Representing Philippines
ABC Championship
Gold medal – first place	1967 Seoul	Team
Silver medal – second place	1971 Tokyo	Team

Adriano R. Papa, Jr. (July 14, 1945 – October 27, 2005), better known as Jun Papa, was a Filipino basketball player. He played for the NU Bulldogs in the University Athletic Association of the Philippines, Ysmael Steel Admirals and the Crispa-Floro Redmanizers in the Manila Industrial and Commercial Athletic Association. Papa also appeared at the Olympic Games as a member of the country's national basketball team.

In 1975, Papa joined the Mariwasa franchise in the PBA where he took the franchise to a finals appearance, losing to Crispa 3-1 during the 1977 All-Filipino Conference best-of-five championship series. Though on the losing side, he was included in that season's Mythical Five. In the six PBA seasons that he played (1975–80), he posted 17.5 ppg scoring average in his career.
