= 1964 pre-Olympic basketball tournament =

2nd pre-Olympic basketball tournament

Tournament details
- Host country: Japan
- Dates: 25 September–3 October 1964
- Venue: (in 1 host city)

Final positions
- Champions: Mexico (1st title)

Tournament statistics
- MVP: Carlos Quintanar
- Top scorer: (Indonesia) Sony Hendrawan
- PPG (Team): Mexico (88)

The 1964 pre-Olympic basketball tournament was an international FIBA World Olympic Qualifying Tournament that was basketball tournament held in Yokohama, Japan from 25 September to 3 October 1964. It served as the final qualification tournament for the 1964 Summer Olympics. The top two teams qualified for the Olympics. After the withdrawal of United Arab Republic (FIBA Africa Championship 1964 winners) and Czechoslovakia (5th placers at the 1960 Olympics) two qualifying berths were added to the qualification tournament thus Canada and South Korea qualified to the Olympics.

== Team standings ==
Team	MP	W	L	PF	PA	PD	Pts
Mexico	9	8	1	792	665	+127	17
Australia	9	8	1	624	534	+90	17
Canada	9	7	2	641	565	+76	16
South Korea	9	5	4	706	669	+37	14
Cuba	9	5	4	698	637	+61	14
Philippines	9	4	5	741	666	+75	13
Thailand	9	3	6	580	675	−95	12
Taiwan	9	3	6	620	653	−33	12
Malaysia	9	1	8	512	750	−238	10
Indonesia	9	1	8	541	641	−100	8
