= Cecil Hechanova =

1st Chairman of the Philippine Sports Commission
- In office 1990–1992
- President: Corazon Aquino
- Preceded by: None, office created
- Succeeded by: Aparicio Mequi

Personal details
- Born: 1932 or 1933
- Died: March 22, 2016 (aged 84)

Cecil G. Hechanova (1932/1933 – March 22, 2016) was the founding chairman of the Philippine Sports Commission from the creation of the government's sports agency in 1990 up until 1992.

== Career ==
He was the non-playing captain of the Philippine national team who participated in the Putra Golf Cup from 1970 to 1972.

From 1988 to 1993, Hechanova was the executive director of the Philippine Golf Foundation. He was also the man behind the Philippine Corporate Cup in 1989.

He became prominent after he was appointed by then president Corazon Aquino as the first chairman of the Philippine Sports Commission, the government's body that focused on sports development. Under his leadership, he continuously developed and enhanced the national training pool of athletes and establish a monitoring team that will track the athlete's performance.

During Hechanova's term as chairman, the Philippines has achieved the first-runner up finish in the 1991 Southeast Asian Games hosted by Manila, after they lost the overall title to Indonesia, by 1 gold, 92–91. It was known as the "Miracle of '91". Among his achievements during the term are the hosting of the 30th Chess Olympiad in Manila, called as the biggest major chess tournament in the world. Russia won the men's championship title. He is also responsible for the revival of the Private Schools Athletic Association meet in 1990, and the formation of the National Institute of Sports and the Philippine Center for Sports Medicine.

In 1992, Hechanova ended his two-year term as PSC chairman, and succeeded by Aparicio Mequi who at that time, the head of Bureau of School Sports of the former Department of Education, Culture and Sports.

He was accorded in the Ateneo Sports Hall of Fame in 2009.

== Personal life ==
Cecil is the brother of Rafael Hechanova, a Filipino basketball player who participated in the 1952 Summer Olympics. His son, Jeric, currently played at the Luisita Golf and Country Club.

== Death ==
In his last years, his health condition was deteriorating. Hechanova died in his sleep on March 22, 2016.
