= Rafael Hechanova =

Filipino basketball player (1928–2021)

Personal information
- Born: July 8, 1928 Jaro, Iloilo, Philippine Islands
- Died: August 26, 2021 (aged 93) Philippines
- Listed height: 5 ft 11 in (180 cm)

Career information
- College: UST

Career history
- –: YCO Painters
Medals
Men's basketball
Representing Philippines
Asian Games
Gold medal – first place	1951 New Delhi	Team
Gold medal – first place	1954 Manila	Team

Rafael "Paing" Hechanova Sr. (July 8, 1928 – August 26, 2021) was a Filipino basketball player who competed in the 1952 Summer Olympics.

== Early life ==
Rafael "Paing" Hechanova was born on July 8, 1928, in the then-city of Jaro in Iloilo province.

== Career ==
=== Playing career ===
Shortly after World War II, Hechanova played varsity basketball for the University of Santo Tomas's (UST) Glowing Goldies under coach Herminio Silva in the UAAP. He was recognized as Mr. Basketball in 1951 by the Philippine Sportswriters Association for helping UST win titles in the UAAP, National Inter-Collegiate, and National Senior. He also played for UST's volleyball and golf teams.

Hechanova suited up for the Philippines men's national team helping the team win the gold medal in the 1951 and 1954 editions. He was also part of the Philippine roster which competed in the 1956 Summer Olympics in Helsinki. He was considered for inclusion in the country's roster for the 1954 FIBA World Championship, but Hechanova already decided to retire and pursue a career in architecture having just passed the board exam at that time.

He also played for the YCO Painters in the Manila Industrial and Commercial Athletic Association (MICAA).

=== Post-retirement ===
Hechanova became involved again the MICAA as an official when the Concepcion Industries joined the league. He eventually became the league's president. When the Philippine Basketball Association was formed in 1975, he became the inaugural board of governors' second vice president. He was inducted to the National Basketball Hall of Fame in 2000. In 2002, he played a role in establishing the Philippine Olympians Association (POA). He served as chairman of the POA.

== Personal life ==
Rafael Hechanova was married to Mely Concepcion until the latter's death in 2019. He was also largely involved in Rotary International serving as a director from 1996 to 1998. Rotary also tasked him and his wife to serve as Mother Teresa's aides during her visit in Manila in 1984. Cecil Hechanova, the founding chairman of the Philippine Sports Commission, was also Rafael's brother.

== Death ==
Hechanova died at the age of 93 on August 26, 2021.
