= Manuel Jocson =

Filipino basketball player

Career information
- High school: Arellano High School (Manila)
- College: UST; FEU

Career history
- 1961–1968: Ysmael Steel Admirals
- 1969: Puyat Steel
- 1970: Crispa Redmanizers
- 1971–1972: Concepcion Industries
Medals
Men's basketball
Representing Philippines
ABC Championship
| Silver medal – second place | 1965 Kuala Lumpur | Team |
Asian Games
| Gold medal – first place | 1962 Jakarta | Team |

Manuel Jocson is a Filipino former basketball player.

Jocson represented the Philippines in five international tournaments: the fourth Asian Games in Jakarta in 1962, Second Asian Basketball Confederation championships in Taipei in 1963; the 1964 World Olympics in Tokyo; Third ABC championship in Kuala Lumpur in 1965; and sixth Asian Games in Bangkok in 1970.

He started his schooling at the Calderon Elementary in Tondo and finish his elementary studies in 1954 and high school at the Arellano High in 1958. Jocson played his first collegiate stint with the University of Santo Tomas in 1959 and powered his team to the UAAP championship. In 1960, he joined FEU and easily made the star-studded Tamaraw quintet composed of Arturo Valenzona, Boy Arazas, Romy Diaz and Oscar Lopez.

In 1961, Jocson was drafted by Ysmael Steel Admirals where he played for seven years, his most memorable moment came in the 1965 MICAA finals between the defending champions Admirals and Crispa Redmanizers, with a few seconds remaining and Crispa ahead by one point, Jocson was able to intercept the ball and connected with the winning basket. When Baby Ysmael disbanded the Admirals in 1968, Jocson transferred to Puyat Steel the following year, he joined Crispa in 1970 and was the team captain when the Redmanizers won their first MICAA title after 13 years of waiting. Jocson played his final two seasons with Concepcion Industries.
