= Kurt Bachmann (basketball) =

Filipino basketball player (1936–2014)

Personal information
- Born: July 18, 1936 Iloilo City, Philippine Commonwealth
- Died: August 29, 2014 (aged 78) Manila, Philippines
- Listed height: 6 ft 4 in (193 cm)
- Listed weight: 170 lb (77 kg)

Career information
- High school: De La Salle (Manila)
- College: De La Salle
- Number: 33

Career history
- YCO Painters
- Ysmael Steel Admirals

Career highlights
- NCAA seniors champion (1956); NCAA juniors champion (1955)
Medals
Men's basketball
Representing Philippines
ABC Championship
Gold medal – first place	1960 Manila	Team
Asian Games
Gold medal – first place	1958 Tokyo	Team
Gold medal – first place	1962 Jakarta	Team

Kurt Bachmann (July 18, 1936 – August 29, 2014) was a Filipino basketball player who competed in the 1960 Summer Olympics. Bachmann was born in Iloilo City, and is of German descent.

Bachmann led the De La Salle Rangers to a juniors' (high school) National Collegiate Athletic Association (Philippines) (NCAA) championship in 1955, and the De La Salle Green Archers to a seniors' (collegiate) championship in 1956. He also played for YCO Painters, notably making the title-clinching jump-shot in 1960 Manila Industrial and Commercial Athletic Association championship. Bachmann represented the Philippines in the 1959 FIBA World Championship, 1960 Summer Olympics, and the 1962 Asian Games.

Bachmann, who has his #33 jersey retired by De La Salle University, died on August 29, 2014. Dickie Bachmann, chairman of the Philippine Sports Commission, is his son.
