= Edgardo Roque =

Filipino basketball player (1938–2026)

Personal information
- Born: February 11, 1938 Obando, Bulacan, Commonwealth of the Philippines
- Died: April 12, 2026 (aged 88)
- Listed height: 6 ft 1 in (185 cm)
- Listed weight: 165 lb (75 kg)

Career information
- College: JRC
- Playing career: 1958–1974

Career history
- 1958–1963: Ysmael Steel Admirals
- 1963–1970: YCO Painters
- 1970–1974: Mariwasa
Medals
Men's basketball
Representing Philippines
ABC Championship
Gold medal – first place	1963 Taipei	Team
Silver medal – second place	1965 Kuala Lumpur	Team
Gold medal – first place	1967 Seoul	Team
Asian Games
Gold medal – first place	1962 Jakarta	Team

Edgardo Roque (February 11, 1938 – April 12, 2026) was a Filipino basketball player who competed in the 1960 Summer Olympics.

Roque made it to six Philippine national teams: 1962 Asian Games in Jakarta; 1963, 1965-1967 Asian Basketball Confederation tournaments in Taipei, Kuala Lumpur and Seoul; 1960 Rome Olympics and 1964 Tokyo Olympics. He was an alternate in the 1968 Mexico Olympics.

In 1956, Roque was asked to try out for the Jose Rizal College basketball team and in the following year, he was donning the Heavy Bomber uniform. His stint with JRC was short because he transferred to Ysmael Steel and stayed with the Admirals until 1963. He joined the YCO Painters until 1970 and then went to Mariwasa before retiring in 1974.

Roque died on April 12, 2026, at the age of 88.
