= Ramon Campos Jr. =

Filipino basketball player

Ramón "Ramoncito" F. Campos Jr. (December 15, 1925 – May 29, 2017) was a Filipino basketball player who competed in the 1948, 1952 and 1956 Summer Olympics.

Campos was born in Iloilo City and started to play basketball at the age of 15. In 1941, he was a member of the junior team of De La Salle College in the NCAA. Campos went to the University of Santo Tomas and played for the Goldies in the UAAP in 1946 and led the team to the varsity championship and in the National Open. Campos had his personal best of 52 points, which he scored when he was playing for the famed Sampaguita Pictures quintet made up of only eight players. His colorful career on the hardcourt also includes seven years with the YCO Painters during the 1950s. Campos retired from major competition in 1958.
