= Lauro Mumar =

Filipino basketball player and coach

Personal information
- Born: March 6, 1924 Talibon, Bohol, Philippine Islands
- Died: December 20, 1990 (aged 66) Pasay, Philippines
- Listed height: 6 ft 1 in (1.85 m)

Career information
- College: San Carlos College; Letran
Medals
Men's basketball
Representing Philippines
FIBA World Championship
Bronze medal – third place	1954 Rio de Janeiro	Team
Asian Games
Gold medal – first place	1951 New Delhi	Team
Gold medal – first place	1954 Manila	Team
Head coach for Philippines
ABC Championship
Bronze medal – third place	1969 Bangkok	Team

Lauro "The Fox" Mumar (March 6, 1924 – December 20, 1990) was a Filipino basketball player and later served as the national team head coach of India and the Philippines. He was one of the greatest Filipino players of his time, playing alongside compatriot legend Carlos Loyzaga.

== Career ==
=== Early years ===
In 1946, he led the San Carlos College of Cebu City to the first post-war Inter-Collegiate basketball championship. He later moved to Manila to play for the varsity team of Letran College where he led the squad nicknamed "Murder Inc." to the 1950 NCAA Philippines championship title.

Mumar also led the Manila Ports Terminal that won the Manila Industrial and Commercial Athletic Association (MICAA) championship.

=== International career ===
He played for the Philippines that finished 12th in the 1948 Summer Olympics held at London, United Kingdom. He later went on to represent the country in the 1951 and 1954 Asian Games to win two gold medals.

==== 1954 FIBA World Championship ====
Mumar was banned for life from playing for the national team by the Philippine Amateur Athletic Federation when he failed to join the rest of the 1954 FIBA World Championship national squad that left Manila for the United States where the team was set to play tune-up games. This led to a national controversy where his ban was discussed in the House of Representatives, and it was found out that he was in Bohol waiting for pocket money from his parents, which never arrived to be able to go to the capital. President Ramon Magsaysay talked with PAAF officials to overturn the ban and was successful.

Mumar was then able to join the rest of the team in Florida. The national squad flew to Cuba and participated in the scrimmage against that country's national team. They won 49–45 over Cuba which was regarded as an upset by the home team. Cuba decided not to participate in the world tournament after the loss. The Philippines finished third and captured the bronze medal, the best finish ever by the country in the World Championships, losing only to the United States and Brazil.

=== Coaching career ===
When he retired from playing basketball he went on to coaching. He has called the shots in collegiate basketball with FEATI, UST and Trinity College. In the commercial leagues, he was the head coach of Mariwasa, Meralco, U/Tex, Seven-Up, Filmanbank and Winston.

While he was at the helm, Meralco won the 1971 Manila Industrial Commercial Athletic Association title winning over Crispa in the final.

Mumar coached the Philippine national team to a third-place finish in the 1969 Asian Basketball Confederation Championship (now FIBA Asia Championship) in Bangkok. After his sole stint with the national team he went to India to teach basketball in the state of Karnataka along with American coaches. He was later named head coach of the Indian national team.

== Later years and legacy ==
In 1981, Mumar worked as a panel analyst with Dick Ildefonso for the PBA games on MBS-4. He was also a radio TV commentator with Joe Cantada covering NCAA contest in the past.

Mumar died on December 20, 1990, while confined at the San Juan De Dios Hospital in Pasay succumbing to a heart ailment.At the time of his death, Mumar was a consultant for the Philippine Airlines' sports and recreation program.

In 2005, he was inducted into the Philippine Sportswriters Association Hall of Fame alongside his teammate Carlos Loyzaga.

== Personal life ==
Mumar was married to Melly Reyes. they had five children, including Lawrence who also became a basketball player. His grandchildren includes L.A. Mumar,

== Awards and achievements ==
- 1948 Summer Olympics, 12th place
- 1951 Asian Games, champions
- 1954 Asian Games, champions
- 1954 FIBA World Championship bronze medalist (third place)
- 1969 FIBA Asia Championship bronze medalist (third place) as coach
- Philippine National Basketball Hall of Fame
