= Leo Prieto =

Filipino sports executive

1st Commissioner of the PBA
- In office April 9, 1975 – December 1982
- Succeeded by: Mariano Yenko

Personal details
- Born: Leopoldo Legarda Prieto; May 19, 1920 Philippines
- Died: April 7, 2009 (aged 88)
- Education: De La Salle University
- Occupation: Sports executive, basketball coach

Leopoldo Legarda Prieto, Sr. (May 19, 1920 – April 7, 2009) was a Filipino sports executive who served as the first commissioner of the Philippine Basketball Association (PBA). Prieto also was a president of the Manila Jockey Club and a supporter of football in the Philippines.

Acknowledged as "the father of the PBA", Prieto was named commissioner of the PBA upon its founding in 1975 and served in that capacity until his resignation in 1983. During Prieto's tenure as commissioner, the PBA prominently featured the rivalry between Crispa and Toyota. Prieto was lauded for his integrity and his ability to manage egos. Prieto himself described the requirements expected of a PBA commissioner as one "must have a good grasp of the game" and one who "the PBA Board of Governors can trust and respect."

As a basketball player, Prieto was a member of the De La Salle Green Archers which won the 1939 NCAA basketball championship and 1939 National Seniors Open title. He later played and coached the YCO Painters. He was the head coach of the Philippines men's national basketball team in the 1956 Melbourne Olympics, leading it to a seventh-place finish. He also coached the YCO Painters to several championships in the Manila Industrial and Commercial Athletic Association.

Prieto died on April 7, 2009, two weeks after suffering a stroke.

Preceded by (none)	PBA Commissioner; 1975–1982	Succeeded by Mariano Yenko
