= Tony Genato =

Filipino basketball player (1929–2023)

Personal information
- Born: June 9, 1929
- Died: November 22, 2023 (aged 94) Quezon City, Philippines
- Listed height: 5 ft 7 in (170 cm)
- Listed weight: 141 lb (64 kg)

Career information
- College: San Beda
- Playing career: 1952–1959

Career history

Playing
- 1952–?: YCO Painters
- ?: Elizalde Ball Club

Coaching
- 1977: Presto Ice Cream

Antonio Genato (June 9, 1929 – November 22, 2023) was a Filipino basketball player who was part of the national team roster that won a gold medal at the 1962 Asian Games. He also competed in the 1952 Summer Olympics, the 1956 Summer Olympics and at the 1954 FIBA World Championship.

== Career ==
Genato had his high school education at the San Beda College. He did not play competitive basketball during his high school years due to a lack of competitions during the war years. Genato took his pre-med studies also in San Beda. He played three seasons for the San Beda Red Lions in the National COllegiatw Athletic Association (Philippines). After finishing his pre-med studies at San Beda, Genato took a course in Medicine at the University of Santo Tomas and joined the YCO in 1952. Genato joined the YCO Athletic Club in 1952. He also worked as manager of Samar Mining during his stint for the Elizalde ball club.

Genato captained the Philippine national team that clinched the bronze medal at the 1954 FIBA World Championship in Brazil which remained the best performance of an Asian nation in the international tournament. Genato also took part in the 1952 and 1956 Summer Olympics.

Genato retired from competitive basketball in 1959 at the age of 30. He briefly coached the PBA team Presto Ice Cream in 1977. He led the team in the first conference of the 1977 season for just two months before he was fired. He finished with a 3–4 win-loss record.

== Death ==
Genato died on November 22, 2023, at the age of 94. He had been admitted to the De Los Santos Medical Center the previous evening. Genato was the last living member of the national team that won bronze in the 1954 FIBA World Championship, and gold at the 1962 Asian Games, the last men's basketball Asian Games gold medal for the Philippines until 2023.
