= Carlos Loyzaga =

Filipino basketball player, coach and politician

The Honorable Carlos Loyzaga
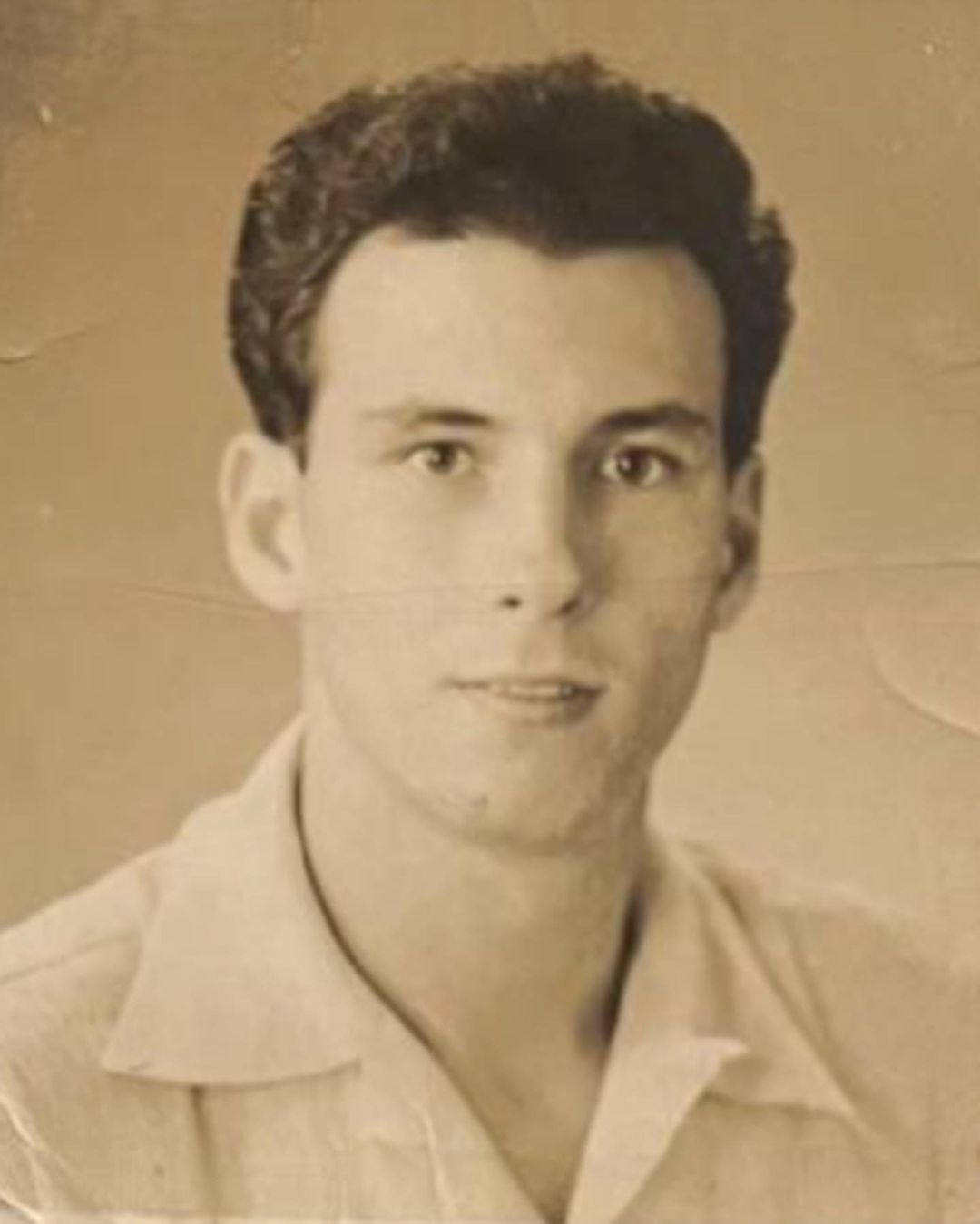
- Loyzaga in 1954

Member of the Manila Municipal Board from the 3rd district
- In office December 30, 1967 – December 30, 1975

Personal details
- Party: Nacionalista
- Basketball career

Personal information
- Born: August 29, 1930 Intramuros, Manila, Philippine Islands
- Died: January 27, 2016 (aged 85) San Juan, Philippines
- Listed height: 6 ft 3 in (1.91 m)
- Listed weight: 82 kg (181 lb)

Career information
- High school: NU (Manila)
- College: San Beda (1951–1954)
- Playing career: 1954–1964
- Position: Center
- Number: 14, 41

Career history

Playing
- 1954–1964: YCO Painters

Coaching
- 1964: YCO Painters
- 1964–1966: UST
- 1960s: Manila Bank Golden Bankers
- 1967: Philippines
- 1975–1976: U/Tex Weavers
- 1977–1979: Tanduay Distillery/Esquires

Career highlights
- As player: 8× MICAA champions (1954, 1955, 1956, 1957, 1958, 1959, 1960, 1964); 3× NCAA champions (1951, 1952, 1955); FIBA WC All-Tournament second team (1954); No. 14 retired by the San Beda Red Lions; As coach: UAAP champion (1964)
- FIBA Hall of Fame
Medals
Men's basketball
Representing Philippines
FIBA World Championship
Bronze medal – third place	1954 Rio de Janeiro	Team
ABC Championship
Gold medal – first place	1960 Manila	Team
Gold medal – first place	1963 Taipei	Team
Asian Games
Gold medal – first place	1951 New Delhi	Team
Gold medal – first place	1954 Manila	Team
Gold medal – first place	1958 Tokyo	Team
Gold medal – first place	1962 Jakarta	Team
Head coach for Philippines
ABC Championship
Gold medal – first place	1967 Seoul	Team

Carlos "Caloy" Loyzaga y Matute (August 29, 1930 – January 27, 2016) was a Filipino basketball player, coach and politician. He was the most dominant basketball player of his era in the Philippines and is considered as the greatest Filipino basketball player of all time. As a member of the Philippine national team, Loyzaga was a two-time Olympian (1952, 1956) and led the Philippines to bronze at the 1954 FIBA World Championship, where he was named to the All-Tournament second team.

On June 2, 2023, he became the first Filipino player to be inducted into the FIBA Hall of Fame, which was done in the lead up to the 2023 FIBA Basketball World Cup, which the Philippines co-hosts.

== Early life ==
Loyzaga was born on August 29, 1930. He was the fourth child of Joaquín de Loyzaga Martínez and María del Carmen Matute y Sequera. His father was a football player and a member of the Philippine national team which competed and won medals at the Far Eastern Championship Games. Loyzaga survived the Second World War together with his mother, sister, and two brothers. He studied at the Padre Burgos Elementary School in Santa Mesa, Manila and National University for high school until 1948.

== Basketball career ==
Loyzaga learned to play basketball in the neighborhood TERVALAC (Teresa Valenzuela Athletic Club) basketball courts in Teresa Street, Santa Mesa, Manila. It was in the very same TERVALAC court where he was discovered by Gabby Fajardo, one of the Philippines' leading coaches of the time. Fajardo saw promise in Loyzaga and offered to train Loyzaga for his junior PRATRA (Philippine Relief and Trade Rehabilitation Administration) team. In 1949, Loyzaga quit high school to play for PRATRA, winning the MICAA junior crown that year.

=== San Beda Red Lions ===
Loyzaga wanted to enroll at Letran, but backed out at the last minute when the coach gave him a cold shoulder. He was about to enroll at the University of Santo Tomas, but this also did not materialize after Fely Fajardo (older brother of Gabby), coach of the San Beda Red Lions, recruited him. In the NCAA cage wars for the coveted Zamora Trophy in the 1950s, San Beda lost its title bid when Loyzaga did not see action due to scholastic reasons.

During the spirited rivalry between the San Beda Red Lions and the Ateneo Blue Eagles, the sports moderator of San Beda discovered that, under the NCAA (National Collegiate Athletic Association) rules, Loyzaga had one year of eligibility left. He was allowed to play for that one year specifically for the Red Lions to capture the Zamora Cup, the prize for the team that had three NCAA championships. The only eligible teams were San Beda (Champions, 1951 and 1952) and Ateneo de Manila (Champions 1953, 1954). Loyzaga successfully helped San Beda clinch the Zamora Trophy. Following San Beda's triple championships (1951, 1952 and 1955), the Zamora Trophy was retired. That moment in time earned Loyzaga the legendary title of "The Big Difference".

=== YCO Painters ===
Loyzaga joined the fabled YCO Painters in 1954 after powering PRATRA, and its successor team, PRISCO (Price Stabilization Corporation), to the National Open championship in 1950 and 1953, respectively. He helped the Painters achieve a 49-game winning streak from 1954 to 1956, including several MICAA titles and ten straight National Open titles. Loyzaga took over as the Painters' head coach after retiring in 1964.

=== Philippine men's basketball team ===
Loyzaga was a two-time Olympian - 1952 (9th place) and 1956 (7th place) - as a member of the Philippines men's national basketball team. He helped the Philippines become one of the best in the world at the time, winning four consecutive Asian Games gold medals (1951, 1954, 1958, 1962) and two consecutive FIBA Asia Championships (1960, 1963). His finest moment was at the 1954 FIBA World Championship where he led the Philippines to a bronze finish. It was the best finish by an Asian country and the Philippines have remained the only Asian medalist in the tournament. He finished as one of the tournament’s leading scorers with a 16.4 points-per-game average and was named in the All-Tournament second team.

== Coaching career ==
Loyzaga started as player-coach for YCO during the early 1960s. After retiring as a player in 1964, he became the head coach of YCO and the Manila Bank Golden Bankers in the MICAA; and the UST Glowing Goldies in the UAAP. He coached the Philippine men's basketball team that won the 1967 ABC Championship (now known as the FIBA Asia Cup and formerly FIBA Asia Championship). In the Philippine Basketball Association, he coached U/Tex (1975-1976) and Tanduay (1977-1979).

== Personal life ==
He was born to Filipino football legend Joaquín Loyzaga and Carmen Matute. Loyzaga was married to Vicky Cuerva on 21 May 1957; the couple's children include basketball players Chito and Joey, Princess, and actresses Bing and Teresa. He was the grandfather of Diego Loyzaga.

Loyzaga died on January 27, 2016, at the Cardinal Santos Medical Center in San Juan, Metro Manila. He suffered a stroke in Australia in 2011 prior to returning to the Philippines in 2013.

As a posthumous commemoration, the San Beda College officially retired the #14 jersey used by Loyzaga during the opening ceremonies of the NCAA Season 92 basketball tournament on June 25, 2016, at the Mall of Asia Arena. Members of the Loyzaga family attended the jersey retirement ceremony.

== Achievements ==
As player:

NCAA

- 1951 NCAA Basketball Champions (San Beda College)
- 1952 NCAA Basketball Champions (San Beda College)
- 1955 NCAA Basketball Champions/Zamora Cup (Retirement Red Lions San Beda College)

MICAA

- 1954 National Basketball Champions (YCO Painters)
- 1955 National Basketball Champions (YCO Painters)
- 1956 National Basketball Champions (YCO Painters)
- 1957 National Basketball Champions (YCO Painters)
- 1958 National Basketball Champions (YCO Painters)
- 1959 National Basketball Champions (YCO Painters)
- 1960 National Basketball Champions (YCO Painters)
- 1964 MICAA Champions (YCO Painters)

Philippine national team

- 1951 Asian Games champions
- 1952 Olympic Games, ninth place
- 1954 Asian Games champions
- 1954 FIBA World Championship bronze medalist
  - FIBA World Championship All-Star Mythical Five (1954)
- 1956 Olympic Games, seventh place
- 1958 Asian Games champions
- 1959 FIBA World Championship, eighth place
- 1960 FIBA Asia Championship champions
  - FIBA Asia Championship All-Star Mythical Five (1960)
- 1962 Asian Games champions
- 1963 FIBA Asia Championship champions

As head coach:

- 1967 FIBA Asia champions
- 1968 Olympic Games, 13th place

== Honors ==
- Philippine National Basketball Hall of Fame (1999)
- Philippine Sportswriters Association Athletes of the 20th Century award (2000)
- Philippine Olympic Committee Presidential Olympism Award (2016)
- FIBA Hall of Fame (2023)

== Publications ==
- Bocobo, Christian and Celis, Beth, Legends and Heroes of Philippine Basketball, (Philippines, 2004)
- Dela Cruz, Juan, Book of Pinoy Facts and Records, (National Bookstore, Mandaluyong, Philippines, 2004)
