= 1967 ABC Championship =

1967 FIBA Asia Cup
4th Asian Basketball Championship

Tournament details
- Host country: South Korea
- Dates: September 21 – October 1
- Teams: 10 (from all Asian confederations)
- Venue: 1 (in 1 host city)

Final positions
- Champions: Philippines (3rd title)

Tournament statistics
- MVP: (Indonesia) Sony Hendrawan

The 1967 Asian Basketball Confederation Championship for Men were held in Seoul, South Korea.

== Results ==
| Team | Pld | W | L | PF | PA | PD | Pts | Tiebreaker |
|---|---|---|---|---|---|---|---|---|
| Philippines | 9 | 9 | 0 | 858 | 589 | +269 | 18 | |
| South Korea | 9 | 8 | 1 | 819 | 582 | +237 | 17 | |
| Japan | 9 | 7 | 2 | 751 | 562 | +189 | 16 | |
| Indonesia | 9 | 5 | 4 | 830 | 782 | +48 | 14 | 1–1 / 1.102 |
| Taiwan | 9 | 5 | 4 | 750 | 689 | +61 | 14 | 1–1 / 0.953 |
| India | 9 | 5 | 4 | 709 | 797 | −88 | 14 | 1–1 / 0.941 |
| Thailand | 9 | 3 | 6 | 662 | 712 | −50 | 12 | |
| Malaysia | 9 | 2 | 7 | 630 | 777 | −147 | 11 | |
| Hong Kong | 9 | 1 | 8 | 539 | 806 | −267 | 10 | |
| Singapore | 9 | 0 | 9 | 640 | 892 | −252 | 9 | |

September 21

| Hong Kong | 78–76 | Singapore |
Scoring by half: 42–39, 36–37

Seoul

September 21

| India | 50–106 | South Korea |
Scoring by half: 24–64, 26–42

Seoul

September 21

| Taiwan | 83–68 | Malaysia |
Scoring by half: 36–27, 47–41

Seoul

September 21

| Philippines | 103–67 | Indonesia |
Scoring by half: 45–33, 58–34

Seoul

September 21

| Japan | 93–66 | Thailand |
Scoring by half: 44–36, 49–30

Seoul

September 22

| Philippines | 92–55 | Malaysia |
Scoring by half: 41–24, 51–31

Seoul

September 22

| Thailand | 84–57 | Hong Kong |
Scoring by half: 49–31, 35–26

Seoul

September 22

| South Korea | 105–87 | Indonesia |
Scoring by half: 51–31, 54–56

Seoul

September 22

| India | 56–89 | Japan |
Scoring by half: 24–52, 32–37

Seoul

September 22

| Singapore | 72–117 | Taiwan |
Scoring by half: 33–57, 39–60

Seoul

September 23

| Japan | 78–69 | Indonesia |
Scoring by half: 34–32, 44–37

Seoul

September 23

| India | 63–111 | Philippines |
Scoring by half: 26–53, 37–58

Seoul

September 23

| Taiwan | 103–62 | Hong Kong |
Scoring by half: 50–31, 53–31

Seoul

September 23

| Thailand | 57–85 | South Korea |
Scoring by half: 30–41, 27–44

Seoul

September 23

| Malaysia | 90–87 | Singapore |
Scoring by half: 46–39, 44–48

Seoul

September 24

| South Korea | 122–71 | Singapore |
Scoring by half: 64–33, 58–38

Seoul

September 24

| Malaysia | 97–78 | Hong Kong |
Scoring by half: 44–24, 53–54

Seoul

September 24

| Taiwan | 71–63 | Thailand |
Scoring by half: 33–29, 38–34

Seoul

September 24

| Indonesia | 130–107 | India |
Scoring by half: 57–52, 73–55

Seoul

September 24

| Philippines | 81–69 | Japan |
Scoring by half: 41–33, 40–36

Seoul

September 26

| Hong Kong | 47–89 | Japan |
Scoring by half: 25–51, 22–38

Seoul

September 26

| Singapore | 58–107 | Philippines |
Scoring by half: 28–52, 30–55

Seoul

September 26

| Indonesia | 89–80 | Malaysia |
Scoring by half: 42–28, 47–52

Seoul

September 26

| Taiwan | 78–89 | South Korea |
Scoring by half: 41–41, 37–48

Seoul

September 26

| Thailand | 82–86 | India |
Scoring by half: 35–38, 47–48

Seoul

September 27

| Hong Kong | 46–86 | South Korea |
Scoring by half: 24–35, 22–51

Seoul

September 27

| Japan | 100–69 | Malaysia |
Scoring by half: 51–27, 49–42

Seoul

September 27

| Philippines | 83–79 | Taiwan |
Scoring by half: 43–38, 40–41

Seoul

September 27

| India | 96–77 | Singapore |
Scoring by half: 47–34, 49–43

Seoul

September 27

| Indonesia | 97–90 | Thailand |
Scoring by half: 44–37, 53–53

Seoul

September 28

| Taiwan | 90–87 | Indonesia |
Scoring by half: 43–55, 47–32

Seoul

September 28

| Hong Kong | 52–103 | Philippines |
Scoring by half: 32–49, 20–54

Seoul

September 28

| Singapore | 69–82 | Thailand |
Scoring by half: 36–44, 33–38

Seoul

September 28

| Malaysia | 64–93 | India |
Scoring by half: 33–42, 31–51

Seoul

September 28

| Japan | 62–63 | South Korea |
Scoring by half: 34–39, 28–24

Seoul

September 30

| India | 74–65 | Hong Kong |
Scoring by half: 29–30, 45–35

Seoul

September 30

| Indonesia | 110–75 | Singapore |
Scoring by half: 49–38, 61–37

Seoul

September 30

| South Korea | 83–48 | Malaysia |
Scoring by half: 36–19, 47–29

Seoul

September 30

| Thailand | 66–95 | Philippines |
Scoring by half: 35–43, 31–52

Seoul

September 30

| Taiwan | 56–81 | Japan |
Scoring by half: 25–40, 31–41

Seoul

October 1

| Hong Kong | 54–94 | Indonesia |
Scoring by half: 33–49, 21–45

Seoul

October 1

| India | 84–73 | Taiwan |
Scoring by half: 42–37, 42–36

Seoul

October 1

| Singapore | 55–90 | Japan |
Scoring by half: 30–41, 25–49

Seoul

October 1

| Thailand | 72–59 | Malaysia |
Scoring by half: 34–27, 38–32

Seoul

October 1

| South Korea | 80–83 | Philippines |
Scoring by half: 38–41, 42–42

Seoul

== Final standings ==
| Qualified for the 1968 Summer Olympics |

| Rank | Team | Record |
|---|---|---|
| 1st place, gold medalist(s) | Philippines | 9–0 |
| 2nd place, silver medalist(s) | South Korea | 8–1 |
| 3rd place, bronze medalist(s) | Japan | 7–2 |
| 4 | Indonesia | 5–4 |
| 5 | Taiwan | 5–4 |
| 6 | India | 5–4 |
| 7 | Thailand | 3–6 |
| 8 | Malaysia | 2–7 |
| 9 | Hong Kong | 1–8 |
| 10 | Singapore | 0–9 |

== Awards ==
1967 Asian champions

Philippines
Third title
