= Philippines at the 1968 Summer Olympics =

- Flag of the Philippines
- IOC code: PHI (FIL used at these Games)
- NOC: Philippine Amateur Athletic Federation

in Mexico City
- Competitors: 49 (45 men, 4 women) in 10 sports
- Medals: Gold 0 Silver 0 Bronze 0 Total 0

Summer Olympics appearances (overview)
- 1924; 1928; 1932; 1936; 1948; 1952; 1956; 1960; 1964; 1968; 1972; 1976; 1980; 1984; 1988; 1992; 1996; 2000; 2004; 2008; 2012; 2016; 2020; 2024; 2028

The Philippines competed at the 1968 Summer Olympics in Mexico City, Mexico. 49 competitors, 45 men and 4 women, took part in 53 events in 10 sports.

== Athletics ==
Men's 100 metres

- Rogelio Onofre

Men's 5,000 metres

- Benjamin Silva-Netto

Men's 10,000 metres

- Benjamin Silva-Netto

Men's Marathon

- Benjamin Silva-Netto

Men's 110m Hurdles

- Rogelio Onofre

== Basketball ==
The Philippines finished with a win–loss record of 3–6, and placed 13th overall.

- Team Roster
  - Orlando Bauzon
  - Danny Florencio
  - Robert Jaworski
  - Jimmy Mariano
  - Alfonso Marquez
  - Rogelio Melencio
  - Edgardo Ocampo
  - Adriano Papa, Jr.
  - Renato Reyes
  - Alberto Reynoso (c)
  - Joaquin Rojas
  - Elias Tolentino
  - Freddie Webb - Alternate
  - Roehl Nadurata - Alternate
  - Head Coach: Carlos Loyzaga

== Boxing ==
Five shooters, all men, represented the Philippines in 1968.

Light flyweight

- Manolo Vicera

Flyweight

- Rodolfo Díaz

Bantamweight

- Dominador Calumarde

Featherweight

- Teogenes Pelegrino

Lightweight

- Rodolfo Arpon

== Cycling ==
Three cyclists represented the Philippines in 1968.

Sprint

- Roberto Roxas
- Rolando Guaves

1000m time trial

- Rolando Guaves

Individual pursuit

- Benjamin Evangelista

== Gymnastics ==
- Ernesto Beren
- Norman Henson

== Shooting ==
Eight shooters, all men, represented the Philippines in 1968.

25 m pistol

- Paterno Miranda
- Horacio Miranda

50 m pistol

- Antonio Mendoza
- José Agdamag

300 m rifle, three positions

- Adolfo Feliciano
- Bernardo San Juan

50 m rifle, three positions

- Adolfo Feliciano
- Leopoldo Ang

50 m rifle, prone

- Jaime Villafuerte
- Adolfo Feliciano

== Swimming ==
=== Men ===
- Roosevelt Abdulgafur
- Luis Ayesa
- Tony Asamali
- Amman Jalmaani
- Leroy Goff

=== Women ===
- Helen Elliott
- Hedy García

== Weightlifting ==
Men's 56 kg - Arturo Dandan (DNF)

== Wrestling ==
Men's Greco-Roman Bantamweight

- Rogelio Famatid DNS

Men's Greco-Roman Featherweight

- Tortillano Tumasis (=19th)

Men's Greco-Roman Lightweight

- Eliseo Salugta (=24th)

Men's Freestyle Bantamweight

- Rogelio Famatid (14th)

Men's Freestyle Featherweight

- Antonio Senosa (Note: also competed at the 1964 Summer Olympics) (=20th)

Men's Freestyle Lightweight

- Eliseo Salugta (=24th)
