= Israel at the 1966 Asian Games =

Israel's competition at the 1966 Asian Games

- IOC code: ISR
- NOC: Olympic Committee of Israel

in Bangkok
- Medals Ranked 11th: Gold 3 Silver 5 Bronze 3 Total 11

Asian Games appearances (overview)
- 1954; 1958; 1962; 1966; 1970; 1974

Israel participated in the 1966 Asian Games held in Bangkok, Thailand from 9 December to 20 December 1966. Israel had previously been unable to complete during the 1962 Asian Games when the host country Indonesia, refused to permit the participation of Israel due to political reasons, stating it would cause issues with their relationship with the Arab states. Although Thailand allowed Israel to participate in 1966, several Arab nations boycotted and riots broke out during the games.

== Medals ==
Games	Gold	Silver	Bronze	Total
Athletics	2	0	1	3
Basketball	1	0	0	1
Shooting	0	1	0	1
Swimming	0	4	2	6
Totals (4 entries)	3	5	3	11

== Athletics ==
=== Medal table ===
Rank	Nation	Gold	Silver	Bronze	Total
1	Israel	2	0	1	3
Totals (1 entries)		2	0	1	3

=== Women ===
Event	Gold		Silver		Bronze	
100 m	Miho Sato; Japan	12.3	Ritsuko Sukegawa; Japan	12.4	Debra Marcus; Israel	12.5
200 m	Debra Marcus; Israel	25.3	Miyoko Tsujishita; Japan	25.3	Kishiko Ikeda; Japan	25.7
800 m	Hana Shezifi; Israel	2:10.5; GR	Yoko Miyamoto; Japan	2:12.7	Yasuyo Mishima; Japan	2:13.6

== Basketball ==
=== Preliminary round - group B ===
==== Standings ====
Team	Pld	W	L	PF	PA	PD	Pts
South Korea	5	5	0	457	298	+159	10
Israel	5	4	1	417	324	+93	9
Philippines	5	3	2	512	357	+155	8
Iran	5	2	3	380	398	−18	7
South Vietnam	5	1	4	378	501	−123	6
Burma	5	0	5	283	549	−266	5

==== Games ====
10 December

Israel	87–55	Iran

Nimibutr Stadium, Bangkok

11 December

Israel	100–70	South Vietnam

Nimibutr Stadium, Bangkok

12 December

South Korea	62–48	Israel

Nimibutr Stadium, Bangkok

14 December

Philippines	86–91	Israel

Nimibutr Stadium, Bangkok

15 December

Israel	91–51	Burma

Nimibutr Stadium, Bangkok

=== Championship ===
==== Bracket ====
Semifinals
17 December
Japan	34
Israel	57
17 December
South Korea	52
Thailand	67

Gold medal game
19 December
Israel	90
Thailand	42
Bronze medal game
19 December
Japan	60
South Korea	72

==== Semifinals ====
17 December

Japan	34–57	Israel

Nimibutr Stadium, Bangkok

==== Gold medal game ====
19 December

Israel	90–42	Thailand

Nimibutr Stadium, Bangkok

=== Roster ===
Coach: Shimon Shelah

- Amnon Avidan
- Tanhum Cohen-Mintz
- Igal Dar
- Gershon Dekel
- Offer Eshed
- Abraham Gutt
- David Kaminsky
- Zvi Lubezki
- Itshak Shachar
- Ami Shelef
- Haim Starkman
- Ilan Zohar

== Shooting ==
=== Medal table ===
Rank	Nation	Gold	Silver	Bronze	Total
1	Israel	0	1	0	1
Totals (1 entries)		0	1	0	1

=== Results ===
Event	Gold	Silver	Bronze
50 m rifle prone	Chu Hwa-il; South Korea	Nehemia Sirkis; Israel	Adolfo Feliciano; Philippines

== Swimming ==
=== Medal table ===
Rank	Nation	Gold	Silver	Bronze	Total
1	Israel	0	4	2	6
Totals (1 entries)		0	4	2	6

=== Men ===
Event	Gold		Silver		Bronze	
200 m breaststroke	Koichi Yamanami; Japan	2:35.0; GR	Kenji Ishikawa; Japan	2:35.4	Gershon Shefa; Israel	2:39.7
100 m butterfly	Isao Nakajima; Japan	1:00.1; GR	Avraham Melamed; Israel	1:00.4	Yasuo Takada; Japan	1:00.7
400 m individual medley	Shigeo Fukushima; Japan	5:04.9; GR	Gershon Shefa; Israel	5:09.5	Tony Asamli; Philippines	5:13.9
4 × 100 m medley relay	Japan; Shigeo Fukushima; Kenji Ishikawa; Isao Nakajima; Kunihiro Iwasaki	4:11.1; GR	Israel; Yoram Schneider; Gershon Shefa; Avraham Melamed; Moshe Gertel	4:18.4	Philippines; Eduardo Abreu; Amman Jalmaani; Leroy Goff; Roosevelt Abdulgafur	4:20.6

=== Women ===
Event	Gold		Silver		Bronze	
100 m freestyle	Michiko Kihara; Japan	1:03.2; GR	Helen Elliott; Philippines	1:04.2	Yvonne Tobis; Israel	1:05.5
200 m individual medley	Yasuko Fujii; Japan	2:38.5; GR	Yvonne Tobis; Israel	2:38.8	Pat Chan; Singapore	2:42.2
