= Philippines at the 1966 Asian Games =

- IOC code: PHI
- NOC: Philippine Olympic Committee
- Website: www.olympic.ph (in English)

in Bangkok
- Medals Ranked 10th: Gold 2 Silver 15 Bronze 25 Total 42

Asian Games appearances (overview)
- 1951; 1954; 1958; 1962; 1966; 1970; 1974; 1978; 1982; 1986; 1990; 1994; 1998; 2002; 2006; 2010; 2014; 2018; 2022; 2026

The Philippines participated in the 1966 Asian Games held in Bangkok, Thailand from December 9 to December 20, 1966. Ranked 10th with 2 gold medals, 15 silver medals and 25 bronze medals with a total of 42 over-all medals.

== Asian Games performance ==
The Philippines won only two gold medals, courtesy of all-around athlete Josephine de la Vina and boxer Rodolfo Arpon, who was the lone gold medalist of the four-man boxing team, ruling the lightweight class.

The Philippine delegation of 147 athletes that competed in 12 sports also won 15 silvers and 25 bronzes. The Games also saw the end of the country's reign as Asia's basketball king, with the RP nationals managing a poor sixth behind champion Israel.

== Medalists ==
The following Philippine competitors won medals at the Games.

=== Gold ===
No.	Medal	Name	Sport	Event
1	Gold	Josephine de la Viña	Athletics	Women's Discus Throw
2	Gold	Rodolfo Arpon	Boxing	Lightweight 60kg

=== Silver ===
No.	Medal	Name	Sport	Event
1	Silver	Lolita Lagrosas	Athletics	Women's High Jump
2	Silver	Claudio Romeo	Cycling	1600m Mass Start
3	Silver	Edgar Bond	Shooting	25m Center Fire Pistol
4	Silver	Nestor de Castro; Horacio Miranda; Paterno Miranda; Raymundo Quitoriano	Shooting	30m Rapid Fire Pistol Team
5	Silver	Leopoldo Ang; Roberto del Castillo; Adolfo Feliciano; Bernardo San Juan	Shooting	50m Rifle 3 Positions Team
6	Silver	Adolfo Feliciano	Shooting	50m Standard Rifle 3
7	Silver	Leopoldo Ang; Roberto del Castillo; Adolfo Feliciano; Lodovico Espinosa	Shooting	50m Standard Rifle 3 Positions Team
8	Silver	Leroy Goff; Haylil Said; Tony Asamli; Roosevelt Abdulgafur	Swimming	Men's 4x200m Freestyle Relay
9	Silver	Helen Elliott	Swimming	Women's 100m Freestyle
10	Silver	Helen Elliott	Swimming	Women's 200m Freestyle
11	Silver	Helen Elliott	Swimming	Women's 400m Freestyle
12	Silver	Helen Elliott; Tessie Lozada; Gertrudes Lozada; Corazon Lozada	Swimming	Women's 4x100m Freestyle Relay
13	Silver	Rosalina Abreu; Hedy Garcia; Gertrudes Lozada; Helen Elliott	Swimming	Women's 4x100m Medley Relay
14	Silver	Desideria Ampon; Patricia Yngayo	Tennis	Women's Doubles
15	Silver	Federico Deyro; Patricia Yngayo	Tennis	Mixed Doubles

=== Bronze ===
No.	Medal	Name	Sport	Event
1	Bronze	Marcelina Alonso	Athletics	Women's Javelin Throw
2	Bronze	Lolita Lagrosas	Athletics	Women's Pentathlon
'3	Bronze	Rogelio Onofre; Remegio Vista; Arnulfo Valles; William Moderno	Athletics	Men's 4x100m Relay
4	Bronze	Rodolfo Diaz	Boxing	Light flyweight 48kg
5	Bronze	Felix Ocampo	Boxing	Light middleweight 71kg
6	Bronze	Bernardo Belleza	Boxing	Middleweight 75kg
7	Bronze	Claudio Romeo	Cycling	Track 10000m Mass Start
8	Bronze	Connie Paredes	Diving	Women's 3m Springboard
9	Bronze	Antonio Arguelles; Edgar Bond; Moises Gines; Horacio Miranda	Shooting	25m Center Fire Pistol Team
10	Bronze	Paterno Miranda	Shooting	50m Rapid Fire Pistol
11	Bronze	Leopoldo Ang; Roberto del Castillo; Adolfo Feliciano; Lodovico Espinosa	Shooting	10m Air Rifle Team
12	Bronze	Adolfo Feliciano	Shooting	50m Rifle Prone
13	Bronze	Adolfo Feliciano	Shooting	50m Rifle 3 Positions
14	Bronze	Roosevelt Abdulgafur	Swimming	Men's 100m Freestyle
15	Bronze	Roosevelt Abdulgafur	Swimming	Men's 200m Freestyle
16	Bronze	Tony Asamli	Swimming	Men's 400m Freestyle
17	Bronze	Tony Asamli	Swimming	Men's 1500m Freestyle
18	Bronze	Amman Jalmaani	Swimming	Men's 100m Breaststroke
19	Bronze	Leroy Goff	Swimming	Men's 200m Butterfly
20	Bronze	Tony Asamli	Swimming	Men's 400m Individual Medley
21	Bronze	Eduardo Abreu; Amman Jalmaani; Leroy Goff; Roosevelt Abdulgafur	Swimming	Men's 4x100m Medley Relay
22	Bronze	Gertrudes Lozada	Swimming	Women's 100m Butterfly
23	Bronze	Jesus Hernandez	Tennis	Men's Singles
24	Bronze	Delfin Contreras; Federico Deyro; Jesus Hernandez; Augusto Villanueva	Tennis	Men's Team
25	Bronze	Desideria Ampon; Patricia Yngayo	Tennis	Women's Team

=== Multiple ===
Name	Sport	Gold	Silver	Bronze	Total
Helen Elliott	Swimming	0	5	0	5
Adolfo Feliciano	Shooting	0	3	3	6
Gertrudes Lozada	Swimming	0	2	1	3
Leopoldo Ang	Shooting	0	2	1	3
Patricia Yngayo	Tennis	0	2	1	3
Roberto del Castillo	Shooting	0	2	1	3
Roosevelt Abdulgafur	Swimming	0	1	3	4
Tony Asamli	Swimming	0	1	3	4
Leroy Goff	Swimming	0	1	2	3
Claudio Romero	Cycling	0	1	1	2
Desideria Ampon	Tennis	0	1	1	2
Edgar Bond	Shooting	0	1	1	2
Federico Deyro	Tennis	0	1	1	2
Horacio Miranda	Shooting	0	1	1	2
Lodovico Espinosa	Shooting	0	1	1	2
Lolita Lagrosas	Athletics	0	1	1	2
Paterno Miranda	Shooting	0	1	1	2
Amman Jalmaani	Swimming	0	0	2	2
Jesus Hernandez	Tennis	0	0	2	2

== Medal summary ==
=== Medals by sports ===
Sport	Gold	Silver	Bronze	Total
Athletics	1	1	3	5
Boxing	1	0	3	4
Swimming	0	6	9	15
Shooting	0	5	5	10
Tennis	0	2	3	5
Cycling	0	1	1	2
Diving	0	0	1	1
Totals (7 entries)	2	15	25	42
