= Swimming at the 1964 Summer Olympics – Men's 200 metre breaststroke =

Men's 200 metre breaststroke at the Games of the XVIII Olympiad
- Venue: Yoyogi National Gymnasium
- Dates: 13 October 1964 (heats); 14 October 1964 (semifinals); 15 October 1964 (final)
- Competitors: 33 from 20 nations
- Winning time: 2:27.8 WR

Medalists
1st place, gold medalist(s)		Ian O'Brien	Australia
2nd place, silver medalist(s)		Georgy Prokopenko	Soviet Union
3rd place, bronze medalist(s)		Chet Jastremski	United States

The men's 200 metre breaststroke event at the 1964 Summer Olympics took place between 13 and 15 October. This swimming event used the breaststroke. Because an Olympic-size swimming pool is 50 metres long, this race consisted of four lengths of the pool.

== Results ==
=== Heats ===
Heat 1

Rank	Athlete	Country	Time	Note
1	Ian O'Brien	Australia	2:31.4	Q, OR
2	Tom Trethewey	United States	2:33.4	Q
3	Klaus Katzur	United Team of Germany	2:36.7	Q
4	Farid Zablith Filho	Brazil	2:45.2	
5	Wieger Mensonides	Netherlands	2:47.4	
6	Huỳnh Văn Hải	Vietnam	2:51.6	

Heat 2

Rank	Athlete	Country	Time	Note
1	Egon Henninger	United Team of Germany	2:30.1	Q, OR
2	Georgy Prokopenko	Soviet Union	2:30.3	Q
3	Ferenc Lenkei	Hungary	2:38.6	Q
4	Peter Tonkin	Australia	2:39.3	
5	Hemmie Vriens	Netherlands	2:40.8	
6	Amman Jalmaani	Philippines	2:44.7	
7	Elliot Chenaux	Puerto Rico	2:52.5	

Heat 3

Rank	Athlete	Country	Time	Note
1	Wayne Anderson	United States	2:31.5	Q
2	Osamu Tsurumine	Japan	2:34.1	Q
3	Rolando Landrito	Philippines	2:41.9	
4	Gian Corrado Gross	Italy	2:42.8	
5	Jin Jang-rim	South Korea	2:48.6	

Heat 4

Rank	Athlete	Country	Time	Note
1	Kenjiro Matsumoto	Japan	2:33.8	Q
2	Vladimir Kosinsky	Soviet Union	2:35.6	Q
3	Willi Messner	United Team of Germany	2:36.0	Q
4	Neil Nicholson	Great Britain	2:36.6	Q
5	Gershon Shefa	Israel	2:40.6	
6	Cesare Caramelli	Italy	2:40.9	
7	Miguel Angel Navarro	Argentina	2:49.7	

Heat 5

Rank	Athlete	Country	Time	Note
1	Chet Jastremski	United States	2:30.5	Q
2	Yoshiaki Shikiishi	Japan	2:32.3	Q
3	Aleksandr Tutakayev	Soviet Union	2:36.9	Q
4	John Oravainen	Australia	2:38.7	Q
5	Nazario Padrón	Spain	2:40.5	
6	Rudolf Brack	Switzerland	2:46.0	
7	Cheah Tong Kim	Malaysia	2:46.2	
8	Charles Fox	Northern Rhodesia	2:49.1	

=== Semifinals ===
==== Semifinal 1 ====
Rank	Athlete	Country	Time	Notes
1	Chet Jastremski	United States	2:32.1	Q
2	Wayne Anderson	United States	2:32.6	Q
3	Egon Henninger	United Team of Germany	2:33.3	Q
4	Osamu Tsurumine	Japan	2:33.3	Q
5	Tom Trethewey	United States	2:34.5	
6	Willi Messner	United Team of Germany	2:35.5	
7	Klaus Katzur	United Team of Germany	2:37.3	
8	Ferenc Lenkei	Hungary	2:37.5	

==== Semifinal 2 ====
Rank	Athlete	Country	Time	Notes
1	Ian O'Brien	Australia	2:28.7	Q, OR
2	Georgy Prokopenko	Soviet Union	2:29.7	Q
3	Aleksandr Tutakayev	Soviet Union	2:30.5	Q
4	Vladimir Kosinsky	Soviet Union	2:33.5	Q
5	Kenjiro Matsumoto	Japan	2:34.3	
6	Yoshiaki Shikiishi	Japan	2:34.5	
7	John Oravainen	Australia	2:39.6	
8	Neil Nicholson	Great Britain	2:39.9	

=== Final ===
Rank	Athlete	Country	Time	Notes
1	Ian O'Brien	Australia	2:27.8	WR
2	Georgy Prokopenko	Soviet Union	2:28.2	
3	Chet Jastremski	United States	2:29.6	
4	Aleksandr Tutakayev	Soviet Union	2:31.0	
5	Egon Henninger	United Team of Germany	2:31.1	
6	Osamu Tsurumine	Japan	2:33.6	
7	Wayne Anderson	United States	2:35.0	
8	Vladimir Kosinsky	Soviet Union	2:38.1	

Key: WR = World record
