= Swimming at the 1966 Asian Games =

- Venue: Visutdrarom Swimming Pool
- Dates: 13–17 December 1966

Swimming was contested at the 1966 Asian Games in Visutdrarom Swimming Pool, Bangkok, Thailand from December 13 to December 17, 1966.

== Medalists ==
=== Men ===
Event	Gold		Silver		Bronze	
100 m freestyle	Kunihiro Iwasaki; Japan	56.1; GR	Teruhiko Kitani; Japan	56.8	Roosevelt Abdulgafur; Philippines	57.1
200 m freestyle	Kunihiro Iwasaki; Japan	2:00.7; GR	Tan Thuan Heng; Singapore	2:04.8	Roosevelt Abdulgafur; Philippines	2:05.3
400 m freestyle	Etsujiro Takase; Japan	4:28.0	Tan Thuan Heng; Singapore	4:29.9	Tony Asamli; Philippines	4:30.0
1500 m freestyle	Etsujiro Takase; Japan	17:36.0; GR	Katsuji Ito; Japan	17:56.6	Tony Asamli; Philippines	18:16.4
100 m backstroke	Yushiro Hayashi; Japan	1:03.2; GR	Kishio Tanaka; Japan	1:03.8	Michael Eu; Singapore	1:07.1
200 m backstroke	Shigeo Fukushima; Japan	2:18.0; GR	Yushiro Hayashi; Japan	2:24.8	Alex Chan; Singapore	2:27.1
100 m breaststroke	Kenji Ishikawa; Japan	1:10.0; GR	Koichi Yamanami; Japan	1:10.1	Amman Jalmaani; Philippines	1:12.4
200 m breaststroke	Koichi Yamanami; Japan	2:35.0; GR	Kenji Ishikawa; Japan	2:35.4	Gershon Shefa; Israel	2:39.7
100 m butterfly	Isao Nakajima; Japan	1:00.1; GR	Avraham Melamed; Israel	1:00.4	Yasuo Takada; Japan	1:00.7
200 m butterfly	Yasuo Takada; Japan	2:12.7; GR	Shinji Yamanouchi; Japan	2:14.5	Leroy Goff; Philippines	2:17.1
400 m individual medley	Shigeo Fukushima; Japan	5:04.9; GR	Gershon Shefa; Israel	5:09.5	Tony Asamli; Philippines	5:13.9
4 × 200 m freestyle relay	Japan; Kunihiro Iwasaki; Teruhiko Kitani; Katsuji Ito; Haruo Yoshimuta	8:27.7; GR	Philippines; Leroy Goff; Haylil Said; Tony Asamli; Roosevelt Abdulgafur	8:46.2	Thailand; Anant Pleanboonlert; Duang Kongchareon; Narong Chokumnuay; Somchai Limpichat	9:03.4
4 × 100 m medley relay	Japan; Shigeo Fukushima; Kenji Ishikawa; Isao Nakajima; Kunihiro Iwasaki	4:11.1; GR	Israel; Joram Shnider; Gershon Shefa; Avraham Melamed; Moshe Gertel	4:18.4	Philippines; Eduardo Abreu; Amman Jalmaani; Leroy Goff; Roosevelt Abdulgafur	4:20.6

=== Women ===
Event	Gold		Silver		Bronze	
100 m freestyle	Michiko Kihara; Japan	1:03.2; GR	Helen Elliott; Philippines	1:04.2	Yvonne Tobis; Israel	1:05.5
200 m freestyle	Michiko Kihara; Japan	2:18.6; GR	Helen Elliott; Philippines	2:18.9	Kazue Hayakawa; Japan	2:19.4
400 m freestyle	Kazue Hayakawa; Japan	4:53.0; GR	Helen Elliott; Philippines	4:55.8	Miwako Kobayashi; Japan	5:00.9
100 m backstroke	Satoko Tanaka; Japan	1:09.5; GR	Kimiko Gabe; Japan	1:11.4	Pat Chan; Singapore	1:15.2
100 m breaststroke	Yoshiko Morizane; Japan	1:22.9; GR	Sakiko Yamashita; Japan	1:23.6	Umbhai Inphang; Thailand	1:25.3
200 m breaststroke	Sakiko Yamashita; Japan	2:58.7	Yoshiko Morizane; Japan	2:58.8	Chintana Thongrat; Thailand	3:03.8
100 m butterfly	Masako Ishii; Japan	1:08.5; GR	Eiko Takahashi; Japan	1:08.6	Gertrudes Lozada; Philippines	1:13.4
200 m individual medley	Yasuko Fujii; Japan	2:38.5; GR	Yvonne Tobis; Israel	2:28.8	Pat Chan; Singapore	2:42.2
4 × 100 m freestyle relay	Japan; Ryoko Urakami; Kazue Hayakawa; Miwako Kobayashi; Michiko Kihara	4:22.6; GR	Philippines; Helen Elliott; Tessie Lozada; Gertrudes Lozada; Corazon Lozada	4:37.4	Singapore; Tay Chin Joo; Jovina Tseng; Molly Tay; Pat Chan	4:50.6
4 × 100 m medley relay	Japan; Kimiko Gabe; Yoshiko Morizane; Masako Ishii; Michiko Kihara	4:51.9; GR	Philippines; Rosalina Abreu; Hedy Garcia; Gertrudes Lozada; Helen Elliott	5:07.7	Indonesia; Winny Han; Fay Loa; Liem Hong Ing; Enny Nuraeni	5:18.3

== Medal table ==
Rank	Nation	Gold	Silver	Bronze	Total
1	Japan (JPN)	23	11	3	37
2	Philippines (PHI)	0	6	9	15
3	Israel (ISR)	0	4	2	6
4	Singapore (SIN)	0	2	5	7
5	Thailand (THA)	0	0	3	3
6	Indonesia (INA)	0	0	1	1
Totals (6 entries)		23	23	23	69
