= Eiko Takahashi =

Japanese swimmer (born 1945)

Personal information
- Born: 21 September 1945 (age 80)

Sport
- Sport: Swimming
Medal record
Representing Japan
Asian Games
Gold medal – first place	1962 Jakarta	100m butterfly
Gold medal – first place	1962 Jakarta	4x100m medley relay
Silver medal – second place	1966 Jakarta	100m butterfly

Eiko Takahashi (高橋 栄子, Takahashi Eiko; born 21 September 1945) is a Japanese former swimmer. At the 1964 Summer Olympics she competed in the 100 meter butterfly race, and the 4 × 100 meter medley relay with fellow swimmers Satoko Tanaka, Noriko Yamamoto, and Michiko Kihara.
