= Shooting at the 1966 Asian Games =

- Venue: Sport Authority of Thailand Sport Complex
- Dates: 11–17 December 1966

Shooting sports at the 1966 Asian Games was held in Sport Authority of Thailand Sport Complex Shooting Range, Bangkok, Thailand from 11 to 17 December 1966. Shooting comprised seven individual and seven team events for a total of fourteen events, all open to both men and women.

Japan dominated the competition by winning seven gold medals.

== Medalists ==
Event	Gold	Silver	Bronze
25 m center fire pistol	Nobuhiro Moriya; Japan	Edgar Bond; Philippines	Rangsit Yanothai; Thailand
25 m center fire pistol team	South Korea; An Jae-song; Koh Min-joon; Park Nam-kyu; Park Oh-joon	Thailand; Boontham Booncharoen; Taweesak Kasiwat; Viraj Visessiri; Rangsit Yanothai	Philippines; Edgar Bond; Moises Gines; Antonio Mendoza; Horacio Miranda
30 m rapid fire pistol	Takeo Kamachi; Japan	Viraj Visessiri; Thailand	Paterno Miranda; Philippines
30 m rapid fire pistol team	Thailand; Boontham Booncharoen; Taweesak Kasiwat; Viraj Visessiri; Rangsit Yanothai	Philippines; Nestor de Castro; Horacio Miranda; Paterno Miranda; Raymundo Quitoriano	Burma; Aye Aye Kyu; Kan U Khin Maung Myint; Kyaw Shein
50 m pistol	Yoshihisa Yoshikawa; Japan	Suh Kang-wook; South Korea	Hoo Kam Chiu; Hong Kong
50 m pistol team	South Korea; An Jae-song; Kim Yong-bae; Koh Min-joon; Suh Kang-wook	Thailand; Paitoon Smuthranond; Viraj Visessiri; Rangsit Yanothai; Amorn Yuktanan	Burma; Aye Aye Kyu; Kan U Khin Maung Myint; Mya Zin
10 m air rifle	Wu Tao-yuan; Republic of China	Nam Sang-wan; South Korea	Elias Joseph Lessy; Indonesia
10 m air rifle team	Japan; Takao Ishii; Junji Kido; Shigemi Saito; Kunio Tamai	South Korea; Bae Byung-ki; Huh Wook-bong; Nam Sang-wan; Oh Gul	Philippines; Leopoldo Ang; Roberto del Castillo; Lodovico Espinosa; Adolfo Feliciano
50 m rifle prone	Choo Hwa-il; South Korea	Nehemia Sirkis; Israel	Adolfo Feliciano; Philippines
50 m rifle prone team	Japan; Takao Ishii; Junji Kido; Shigemi Saito; Kunio Tamai	South Korea; Bae Byung-ki; Choo Hwa-il; Nam Sang-wan; Oh Gul	Republic of China; Lee Chang-yen; Pan Kou-ang; Tai Chao-chih; Wu Tao-yuan
50 m rifle 3 positions	Wu Tao-yuan; Republic of China	Takao Ishii; Japan	Adolfo Feliciano; Philippines
50 m rifle 3 positions team	Japan; Takao Ishii; Junji Kido; Shigemi Saito; Kunio Tamai	Philippines; Leopoldo Ang; Roberto del Castillo; Adolfo Feliciano; Bernardo San Juan	South Korea; Bae Byung-ki; Huh Wook-bong; Nam Sang-wan; Song Joo-chae
50 m standard rifle 3 positions	Wu Tao-yuan; Republic of China	Adolfo Feliciano; Philippines	Takao Ishii; Japan
50 m standard rifle 3 positions team	Japan; Takao Ishii; Junji Kido; Shigemi Saito; Kunio Tamai	Philippines; Leopoldo Ang; Roberto del Castillo; Lodovico Espinosa; Adolfo Feliciano	Thailand; Krisda Arunvongse; Charumai Mahawat; Preeda Phengdisth; Salai Srisathorn

== Medal table ==
Rank	Nation	Gold	Silver	Bronze	Total
1	Japan (JPN)	7	1	1	9
2	South Korea (KOR)	3	4	1	8
3	Republic of China (ROC)	3	0	1	4
4	Thailand (THA)	1	3	2	6
5	Philippines (PHI)	0	5	5	10
6	Israel (ISR)	0	1	0	1
7	Burma (BIR)	0	0	2	2
8	Hong Kong (HKG)	0	0	1	1
8	Indonesia (INA)	0	0	1	1
Totals (9 entries)		14	14	14	42
