= Israel at the 1968 Summer Olympics =

- IOC code: ISR
- NOC: Olympic Committee of Israel

in Mexico City
- Competitors: 29 (26 men, 3 women) in 4 sports
- Flag bearer: Gershon Shefa
- Medals: Gold 0 Silver 0 Bronze 0 Total 0

Summer Olympics appearances (overview)
- 1952; 1956; 1960; 1964; 1968; 1972; 1976; 1980; 1984; 1988; 1992; 1996; 2000; 2004; 2008; 2012; 2016; 2020; 2024

Israel competed at the 1968 Summer Olympics in Mexico City, Mexico. 29 competitors, 26 men and 3 women, took part in 20 events in 4 sports.

== Results by event ==
=== Athletics ===
Event	Participant	Result	Ref
50 km walk	Shaul Ladany	24th place Time: 5.1.6.	
400 meter women	Hana Shezifi	7th in 3rd elimination heat Time: 56.3	
800 meter women	Hana Shezifi	6th in 2nd elimination head Time: 2:09.2	

=== Football ===
==== Preliminary round - Group C ====
During the Group C competition, Ghana replaced Morocco, after Morocco refused to play Israel.

===== Standings =====
Team	Pld	W	D	L	GF	GA	GD	Pts
Hungary	3	2	1	0	8	2	+6	5
Israel	3	2	0	1	8	6	+2	4
Ghana	3	0	2	1	6	8	−2	2
El Salvador	3	0	1	2	2	8	−6	1

===== Matches =====
1968-10-13
12:00

Israel	5 – 3	Ghana
Spiegel 11' 75'; Feigenbaum 16' 30' 70'	Report	Jabir 18' 79'; Amosa 35'

Estadio Nou Camp, León
Referee: Michel Kitabdjian (France)

1968-10-15
12:00

Israel	3 – 1	El Salvador
Talbi 20'; Spiegler 44'; Bar 85'	Report	Martínez 35'

Estadio Nou Camp, León
Referee: Thompson Shakibudeen Badru (Nigeria)

1968-10-17
12:00

Hungary	2 – 0	Israel
A. Dunai 40' 75'	Report

Estadio Jalisco, Guadalajara
Referee: Arturo Yamasaki (Peru)

==== Quarter-finals ====
===== Final ranking =====
As per statistical convention in football, matches decided in extra time are counted as wins and losses, while matches decided by penalty shoot-outs are counted as draws.

Pos	Team	Pld	W	D	L	GF	GA	GD	Pts	Final result
1st place, gold medalist(s)	Hungary	6	5	1	0	18	3	+15	11	Gold medal
2nd place, silver medalist(s)	Bulgaria	6	3	2	1	16	10	+6	8	Silver medal
3rd place, bronze medalist(s)	Japan	6	3	2	1	9	8	+1	8	Bronze medal
4	Mexico	6	3	0	3	10	9	+1	6	Fourth place
5	Israel	4	2	1	1	9	7	+2	5	Eliminated in quarter-finals
6	Spain	4	2	1	1	4	2	+2	5	Eliminated in quarter-finals
7	France	4	2	0	2	9	7	+2	4	Eliminated in quarter-finals
8	Guatemala	4	2	0	2	6	4	+2	4	Eliminated in quarter-finals
9	Czechoslovakia	3	1	1	1	10	3	+7	3	Eliminated in group stage
10	Colombia	3	1	0	2	4	5	−1	2	Eliminated in group stage
11	Guinea	3	1	0	2	4	9	−5	2	Eliminated in group stage
12	Ghana	3	0	2	1	6	8	−2	2	Eliminated in group stage
13	Brazil	3	0	2	1	4	5	−1	2	Eliminated in group stage
14	Nigeria	3	0	1	2	4	9	−5	1	Eliminated in group stage
15	El Salvador	3	0	1	2	2	8	−6	1	Eliminated in group stage
16	Thailand	3	0	0	3	1	19	−18	0	Eliminated in group stage

Source: Olympics

===== Bracket =====
Quarter-finals
20 October - Guadalajara
Hungary	1
Guatemala	0
20 October - Mexico City
Japan	3
France	1
20 October - Leon
Bulgaria	1
Israel	1
20 October - Puebla
Mexico	2
Spain	0

Semi-finals
22 October - Mexico City
Hungary	5
Japan	0
22 October - Guadalajara
Bulgaria	3
Mexico	2

Final
26 October - Mexico City
Hungary	4
Bulgaria	1
Bronze-medal match
24 October - Mexico City
Japan	2
Mexico	0

===== Matches =====
1968-10-20
12:00

Bulgaria	1 – 1	Israel
Hristakiev 5'	Report	Feigenbaum 89'

Estadio Nou Camp, León
Referee: Michel Kitabdjian (France)

Bulgaria progressed after a drawing of lots.

==== Goal scorers ====
4 goals

- Yehoshua Feigenbaum

2 goals

- Giora Spiegel

1 goal

- Mordechai Spiegler
- Rachamim Talbi
- Shraga Bar

==== Squad ====
Head coach: Emmanuel Scheffer

No.	Pos.	Player	DoB	Age	Caps	Club	Tournament games	Tournament goals	Minutes played	Sub off	Sub on	Cards yellow/red
1	GK	Haim Levin	3 Mar 1937	31	?	(Israel) Maccabi Tel Aviv	3	0	300	0	0	0
2	DF	Shraga Bar	24 Mar 1948	21	?	(Israel) Maccabi Netanya	4	1	293	0	1	(yellow card) 1
3	DF	Menachem Bello	26 Dec 1947	20	?	(Israel) Maccabi Tel Aviv	4	0	390	0	0	0
4	DF	Zvi Rosen	23 Jun 1947	21	?	(Israel) Maccabi Tel Aviv	4	0	390	0	0	(yellow card) 3
5	DF	Yisha'ayahu Schwager	10 Feb 1946	22	?	(Israel) Maccabi Haifa	3	0	196	2	0	0
6	MF	Shmuel Rosenthal	22 Apr 1947	21	?	(Israel) Hapoel Petah Tikva	3	0	300	0	0	(yellow card) 1
7	FW	Rachamim Talbi	17 May 1943	25	?	(Israel) Maccabi Tel Aviv	3	1	238	0	0	(yellow card) 1 (red card) 1
8	MF	Giora Spiegel	27 Jul 1947	21	?	(Israel) Maccabi Tel Aviv	4	2	390	0	0	0
9	FW	Yehoshua Feigenbaum	5 Dec 1947	20	?	(Israel) Hapoel Tel Aviv	4	4	390	0	0	0
10	FW	Mordechai Spiegler	19 Aug 1944	23	?	(Israel) Maccabi Netanya	4	1	390	0	0	0
11	MF	Roby Young	15 May 1942	26	?	(Israel) Hapoel Haifa	2	0	120	1	1	0
12	FW	Itzhak Drucker	3 Jul 1947	21	?	(Israel) Hapoel Petah Tikva	3	0	211	0	0	(red card) 1
13	MF	George Borba	12 Jul 1944	23	?	(Israel) Hapoel Tel Aviv	3	0	225	1	0	0
14	DF	Yitzhak Englander	30 Apr 1946	22	?	(Israel) Hapoel Haifa	1	0	45	0	1	0
15	MF	Itzhak Shum	1 Sep 1948	19	?	(Israel) Hapoel Kfar Saba	0	0	0	0	0	0
16	DF	David Karako	11 Feb 1945	23	?	(Israel) Maccabi Tel Aviv	1	0	70	1	0	0
17	FW	Nachman Castro	23 Jan 1948	20	?	(Israel) Hapoel Tel Aviv	1	0	20	0	1	0
18	GK	Zion Digmi	8 May 1942	26	?	(Israel) Hapoel Ramat Gan	0	0	0	0	0	0
19	GK	Shmuel Malika-Aharon	1 Jan 1947	21	?	(Israel) Bnei Yehuda	1	0	90	0	0	0

=== Shooting ===
Four shooters, all men, represented Israel in 1968.

Event	Participant	Result	Ref
50 m Rifle - Prone position	Nehemia Sirkis	28th	
50 m Rifle - Prone position	Henry Herscovici	45th	
50 m Pistol	Michael Marton	47th	
50 m Rifle - Three positions	Henry Herscovici	41st	
50 m Rifle - Three positions	Zelig Shtroch	51st	

=== Swimming ===
Gender	Event	Participant	Result	Ref
Men's	200 m freestyle	Amnon Krauz	5th in 2nd elimination heat Time: 2:01.6	
Men's	100 m freestyle	Amnon Krauz	6th in 9th elimination heat Time: 57.2	
Men's	100 m breaststroke	Yohan Kende	6th in 5th elimination heat Time: 1:12.3	
Men's	200 m breaststroke	Gershon Shefa	7th in 3rd elimination heat	
Men's	200 m breaststroke	Yohan Kende	8th in 4th elimination heat	
Men's	100 m butterfly	Abraham Melamed	4th in semi-finals Time: 59.6	
Men's	200 m butterfly	Abraham Melamed	3rd in 1st elimination heat	
Men's	200 m butterfly	Gershon Shefa	5th in 6th elimination heat	
Women's	100 m breaststroke	Shlomit Nir	3rd in 2nd elimination heat Time: 1:20.9	
Women's	200 m breaststroke	Shlomit Nir	5th in 3rd elimination heat	
Women's	100 m butterfly	Yvonne Tobis	3rd in 3rd elimination heat Time: 1:12.0	
Women's	200 m individual medley	Yvonne Tobis	4th in 1st elimination heat Time: 2:41.0	
Women's	400 m individual medley	Yvonne Tobis	6th in 4th elimination heat	
