= Keisuke Ito =

Keisuke Ito may refer to:

- Keisuke Ito (botanist), Japanese physician and biologist
- Keisuke Ito (swimmer), Japanese swimmer
