= Martha Randall =

American swimmer (born 1948)

Martha Irene Randall -Martin
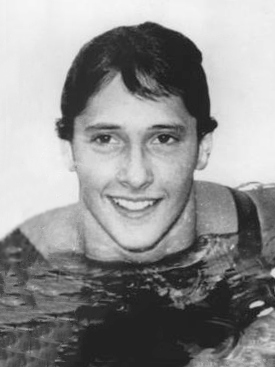
- Randall at the 1964 Olympics

Personal information
- Full name: Martha Irene Randall
- National team: United States
- Born: June 12, 1948 (age 78) Chicago, Illinois, U.S.
- Height: 5 ft 5 in (165 cm)
- Weight: 126 lb (57 kg)
- Spouse: Frank Albert Martin (1969)

Sport
- Sport: Swimming
- Strokes: Freestyle; Individual medley
- Club: Vesper Boat Club; Philadelphia
- College team: Marymount College
- Coach: Mary Freeman (Vesper BC)
Medal record
Representing the United States
Olympic Games
Bronze medal – third place	1964 Tokyo	400 m medley
Summer Universiade
Gold medal – first place	1967 Tokyo	100 m butterfly
Gold medal – first place	1967 Tokyo	4×100 m freestyle
Gold medal – first place	1967 Tokyo	4×100 m medley
Bronze medal – third place	1967 Tokyo	100 m backstroke

Martha Irene Randall (born June 12, 1948) is an American former competition swimmer, a 1964 Tokyo bronze Olympic medalist in the 4x100-meter individual medley, and a former world record-holder. She attended Marymount College in Tarrytown, New York graduating in 1970, and took the name Martha Randall Martin after her marriage to Frank Albert Martin in March, 1969. In her 30's and 40's as Martha Martin, she was active in United States Masters Swimming, and swam with Team Orlando Masters, setting several age-group records.

== Early life and swimming ==
Vespar B.C. Coach Mary Freeman

Martha Randall was born on June 12, 1948 in Chicago, Illinois to Mr. and Mrs. John J. Randall, but grew up in Philadelphia. Randall's older sister Jane was also an accomplished High School swimmer, and she had a younger sister Tami. Martha graduated the Holy Child School at Rosemont, in Rosemont, Pennsylvania outside Philaelphia in 1966, where her primary academic interests were French and History.

Randall was Coached by Mary Freeman at Philadelphia's Vesper Boat Club Swim team, where she did much of her early training, beginning around the age of 12. In July, 1963 at the Eastern Championships in Philadelphia, she set AAU Middle Atlantic District records in the 200 freestyle with a time of 2:16.3, and the 400-meter individual medley with a time of 5:31.2.

In competition highlights, Randall earned five individual AAU titles in freestyle events. In relay events, she also captured three AAU championships.

== 1964 Olympic 400-meter medley bronze ==
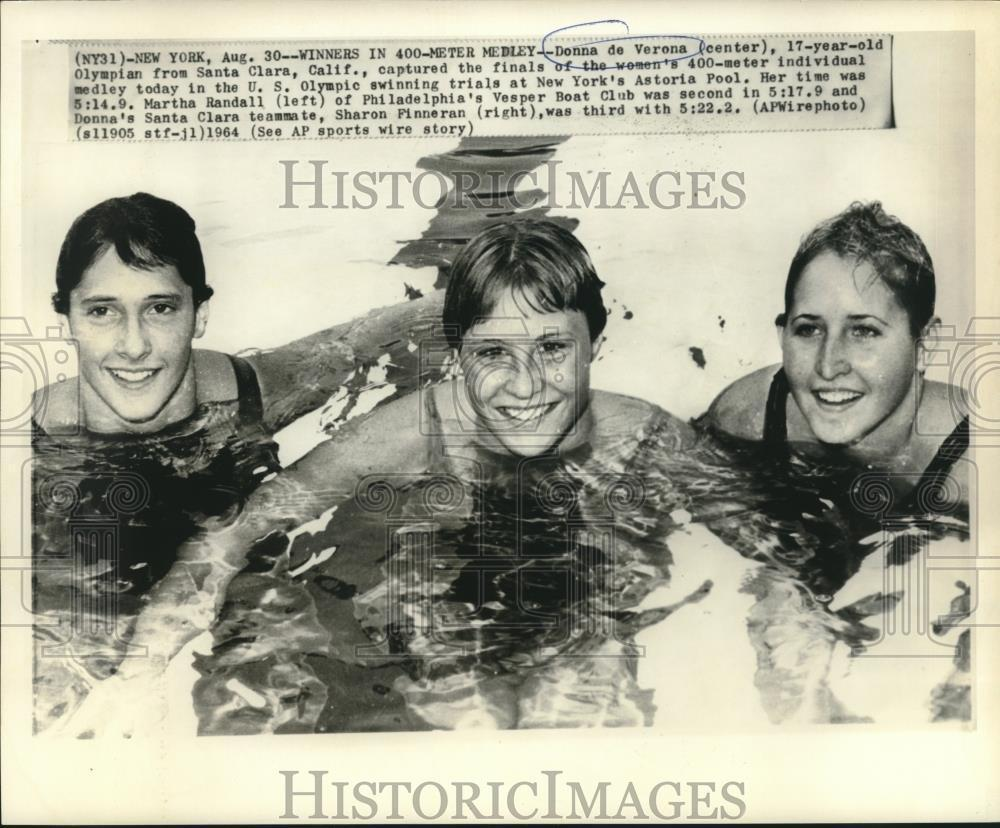
Randal (left) at '64 Olympic Trials, D. DeVaronna (center), S. Finneran (right)

Her 400 IM time at the 1964 Olympic trials of 5:17.9, in Astoria, New York, put her in second place behind U.S. teammate Donna DeVaronna who swam a 5:14.9. Randall's time and second place finish qualified her for the U.S. Olympic team. Sharon Finneran was third.

As a 16-year-old, Randall competed in the 1964 Summer Olympics held in Tokyo, Japan. She received a bronze medal for her third-place performance in the 400-meter individual medley, finishing in 5:24.2. The U.S. women's team swept the 400-meter event with Randall's fellow American teammates, Donna de Varona and Sharon Finneran, who finished first and second.

At the Tokyo Olympics, Randall helped set a new world-record time of 4:34.6 in the 4×100-meter medley relay as a member of a U.S. team that included Cathy Ferguson, Cynthia Goyette, and Kathy Ellis on September 28, 1964. The record was broken twenty days later by another U.S. team at the 1964 Olympics.

On August 14, 1965, Randall set a long course World record in the 400-meter freestyle of 4:39.2 which held through June 30, 1967.

On March 18, 1966, Randall, demonstrating her regional dominance in long distance freestyle events, swam a Middle Atlantic district record of 18:59.7 seconds for the 1650-yard freestyle, winning the event in the AAU Middle Atlantic Championships at Memorial Hall Pool in Philadelphia.

At the 1967 Summer Universiade, she won gold medals in the 100-meter butterfly, the 100 m butterfly, the 4×100 m freestyle, and the 4×100 m medley. She won a bronze medal in the 100 m backstroke.

== Later life ==
=== Marymount College ===
From around 1966-70, Randall attended Marymount College in Tarrytown, New York, later part of Fordham University. At Marymount, she competed in swimming, and on March 8, 1969, swam a 56.9 for the 100 freestyle at the Eastern Intercollegiate women's swimming championship in Philadelphia, though the womnen's team from Marymount won few other events.

On August 23, 1969, she was married to Frank Albert Martin at St. Katherine of Sienna Church in Wayne, Pennsylvania. Frank Martin, who worked as an investment analyst, graduated Indiana's Hanover College, and received a Masters in Business from the University of Chicago. The couple planned to live in Fort Lee, New Jersey while Martha completed college at Marymount.

From 1987-1991, as Martha Randall Martin, she competed in United States Masters Swimming from the ages of 38-42, where she obtained a number of first place finishes particularly from 39-40 in freestyle, backstroke, and butterfly events. She received All-American Masters honors from the ages of 35 to 44, and for several years swam with Team Orlando Masters (TOM).

== See also ==
- List of Olympic medalists in swimming (women).
- World record progression 400 metres freestyle.
- World record progression 4 × 100 metres medley relay.
