= Teruhiko =

- Gender: Male

Origin
- Origin: Japanese
- Meaning: Different meanings depending on the kanji used

Teruhiko (written: 輝彦, 照彦 or 晃彦) is a masculine Japanese given name. Notable people with the name include:

- Teruhiko Kitani (木谷 晃彦; born 1945), Japanese swimmer
- Teruhiko Mashiko (増子 輝彦; born 1947), Japanese politician
- Teruhiko Miyahara (宮原 照彦; born 1951), Japanese sport wrestler
- Teruhiko Saigō (西郷 輝彦; born 1947), Japanese singer and actor
