= Tobis =

Tobis may refer to:

- Tobis Film, German studio.
- Tobis Portuguesa, a company formed to foster the development of Portuguese cinema.
- Yvonne Tobis (born 1948), Israeli Olympic swimmer.
