= Swimming at the 1967 Summer Universiade =

Swimming at the V Summer Universiade

The swimming competition at the 1967 Summer Universiade took place in Tokyo, Japan in August 1967.

== Men's events ==
Event	Gold		Silver		Bronze	
100 m freestyle	Don Havens; United States	53.2	Bob McGregor; Great Britain	53.4	Zac Zorn; United States	53.8
400 m freestyle	Greg Charlton; United States	4:08.2	Mike Burton; United States	4:13.6	Tony Jarvis; Great Britain	4:21.1
1500 m freestyle	Mike Burton; United States	16:34.6	Andy Strenk; United States	16:43.4	Katsuji Ito; Japan	17:32.9
100 m backstroke	Charlie Hickcox; United States	59.3	Doug Russell; United States	1:00.0	Roderick Jones; Great Britain	1:02.6
200 m backstroke	Charlie Hickcox; United States	2:09.4	Mark Mader; United States	2:13.5	Shigeo Fukushima; Japan	2:15.9
100 m breaststroke	Ken Merten; United States	1:08.1	Kenji Ishikawa; Japan	1:08.7	Osamu Tsurumine; Japan	1:09.4
200 m breaststroke	Ken Merten; United States	2:31.2	Osamu Tsurumine; Japan	2:31.5	Kenji Ishikawa; Japan	2:34.5
100 m butterfly	Doug Russell; United States	56.3	Carl Robie; United States	58.0	Shuichi Kitamura; Japan	59.7
200 m butterfly	John Ferris; United States	2:06.0	Carl Robie; United States	2:06.9	Shinji Yamanouchi; Japan	2:11.5
400 m individual medley	Peter Williams; United States	4:46.7	John Ferris; United States	4:57.7	Toru Udo; Japan	5:00.6
4 × 100 m freestyle relay	United States (USA); Ken Walsh; Don Havens; Greg Charlton; Zac Zorn	3:32.6	Great Britain (GBR)	3:40.2	Japan (JPN); Kunihiro Iwasaki; Akihiko Kitani; Takashi Uchinuo; Satoru Nakano	3:42.2
4 × 200 m freestyle relay	United States (USA); Greg Charlton; John Nelson; Charlie Hickcox; Carl Robie	7:56.5	Great Britain (GBR)	8:12.0	Japan (JPN); Kunihiro Iwasaki; Akihiko Kitani; Satoru Nakano; Yoshio Aoki	8:12.6
4 × 100 m medley relay	United States (USA); Charlie Hickcox; Ken Merten; Doug Russell; Ken Walsh	3:57.2	Japan (JPN); Kishio Tanaka; Kenji Ishikawa; Shuichi Kitamura; Kunihiro Iwasaki	4:04.9	Great Britain (GBR)	4:09.1

Legend: CR – Championship record; CWR – Commonwealth record; NR – National record

== Women's events ==
Event	Gold		Silver		Bronze	
100 m freestyle	Linda Gustavson; United States	1:00.2	Lynne Allsup; United States	1:01.8	Michiko Kihara; Japan	1:03.5
400 m freestyle	Linda Gustavson; United States	4:37.8	Lee Davis; United States	4:43.8	Michiko Kihara; Japan	4:55.4
100 m backstroke	Kendis Moore; United States	1:07.9	Françoise Borie; France	1:10.3	Martha Randall; United States	1:11.0
100 m breaststroke	Diana Harris; Great Britain	1:18.9	Cynthia Goyette; United States	1:19.0	Christine Barnetson; Australia	1:20.5
200 m breaststroke	Cynthia Goyette; United States	2:50.1	Diana Harris; Great Britain	2:54.5	Fumiko Nagumo; Japan	2:56.2
100 m butterfly	Martha Randall; United States	1:06.9	Sydnee Arth; United States	1:07.6	Masako Ishii; Japan	1:08.5
200 m individual medley	Maddie Ellis; United States	2:31.3	Debbie Ledford; United States	2:32.8	Carla Galle; Belgium	2:41.9
4 × 100 m freestyle relay	United States (USA); Linda Gustavson; Lynne Allsup; Martha Randall; Maddie Ellis	4:04.2	Japan (JPN)	4:18.8	Italy (ITA)	4:21.8
4 × 100 m medley relay	United States (USA); Kendis Moore; Cynthia Goyette; Martha Randall; Linda Gustavson	4:36.2	Great Britain (GBR); Japan (JPN)	4:50.1	Not Awarded	

Legend: CR – Championship record; CWR – Commonwealth record; NR – National record

== Medal table ==
Rank	Nation	Gold	Silver	Bronze	Total
1	United States (USA)	21	12	2	35
2	Great Britain (GBR)	1	5	3	9
3	Japan (JPN)	0	5	13	18
4	France (FRA)	0	1	0	1
5	Australia (AUS)	0	0	1	1
5	Belgium (BEL)	0	0	1	1
5	Italy (ITA)	0	0	1	1
Totals (7 entries)		22	23	21	66
