= Pamela Johnson =

Pamela or Pam Johnson may refer to:

- Pamela Johnson (swimmer), British swimmer
- Pamela Hansford Johnson, English novelist, playwright, poet, literary and social critic
- Pam Johnson (editor), American newspaper editor
