= Swimming at the 1962 Asian Games =

- Venue: Senayan Swimming Stadium
- Dates: 29 August – 1 September 1962

Swimming was contested at the 1962 Asian Games at the Senayan Swimming Stadium in Jakarta, Indonesia from 29 August to 1 September 1962.

== Medalists ==
=== Men ===
Event	Gold		Silver		Bronze	
100 m freestyle	Keigo Shimizu; Japan	56.6; GR	Tadaharu Goto; Japan	56.7	Achmad Dimyati; Indonesia	57.2
200 m freestyle	Toshizo Umemoto; Japan	2:06.0; GR	Tadaharu Goto; Japan	2:08.2	Tin Maung Ni; Burma	2:09.4
400 m freestyle	Tin Maung Ni; Burma	4:33.0	Toshizo Umemoto; Japan	4:33.5	Masami Nakabo; Japan	4:34.1
1500 m freestyle	Tin Maung Ni; Burma	18:17.6	Tohachiro Matsuki; Japan	18:27.3	Toshiaki Sahara; Japan	18:32.3
100 m backstroke	Kazuo Tomita; Japan	1:04.3; GR	Keisuke Ito; Japan	1:04.8	Sampang Hassan; Philippines	1:09.2
200 m backstroke	Keisuke Ito; Japan	2:21.1; GR	Kazuo Tomita; Japan	2:22.6	Poo Boen Tiong; Indonesia	2:31.7
100 m breaststroke	Kenji Ishikawa; Japan	1:12.3; GR	Kiyoshi Nakagawa; Japan	1:12.8	Jin Jang-rim; South Korea	1:15.4
200 m breaststroke	Kiyoshi Nakagawa; Japan	2:40.1; GR	Kenji Ishikawa; Japan	2:41.9	Rolando Landrito; Philippines	2:44.4
100 m butterfly	Kenzo Izutsu; Japan	1:02.4	Koji Iwamoto; Japan	1:03.1	Amir Hussin Hamsain; Philippines	1:03.6
200 m butterfly	Kenzo Izutsu; Japan	2:19.1; GR	Koji Iwamoto; Japan	2:23.0	Amir Hussin Hamsain; Philippines	2:23.6
4 × 200 m freestyle relay	Japan; Akikazu Takemoto; Tadaharu Goto; Keigo Shimizu; Toshizo Umemoto	8:38.2	Indonesia	8:53.3	Philippines; Roosevelt Abdulgafur; Bana Sailani; Haylil Said; Victorino Marcelino	8:54.3
4 × 100 m medley relay	Japan; Kazuo Tomita; Kenji Ishikawa; Kenzo Izutsu; Keigo Shimizu	4:15.7; GR	Philippines; Sampang Hassan; Antonio Saloso; Amir Hussin Hamsain; Roosevelt Abdulgafur	4:28.9	Indonesia; Kemal Lubis; Abdul Rasjid; Sudarman; Achmad Dimyati	4:29.0

=== Women ===
Event	Gold		Silver		Bronze	
100 m freestyle	Yoshiko Sato; Japan	1:06.0 =GR	Toyoko Kimura; Japan	1:06.1	Haydee Coloso-Espino; Philippines	1:07.3
200 m freestyle	Yoshiko Sato; Japan	2:24.5; GR	Yumiko Kobayashi; Japan	2:30.4	Corazon Lozada; Philippines	2:35.1
400 m freestyle	Toyoko Kimura; Japan	5:01.8; GR	Kazue Hayakawa; Japan	5:02.6	Corazon Lozada; Philippines	5:30.4
100 m backstroke	Satoko Tanaka; Japan	1:11.0; GR	Hiromi Yotsumoto; Japan	1:13.9	Oey Lian Nio; Indonesia	1:19.3
100 m breaststroke	Noriko Yamamoto; Japan	1:23.9; GR	Iris Tobing; Indonesia	1:24.5	Sachiko Aoki; Japan	1:24.9
200 m breaststroke	Noriko Yamamoto; Japan	2:59.6	Sachiko Aoki; Japan	3:00.5	Iris Tobing; Indonesia	3:05.7
100 m butterfly	Eiko Takahashi; Japan	1:12.6; GR	Michiyo Nakanishi; Japan	1:14.4	Gertrudes Lozada; Philippines	1:15.8
4 × 100 m freestyle relay	Japan; Toyoko Kimura; Kimiko Ezaka; Taeko Tsujimoto; Yoshiko Sato	4:27.6	Philippines; Connie Paredes; Corazon Lozada; Gertrudes Lozada; Haydee Coloso-Espino	4:43.8	Indonesia; Enny Nuraeni; Lie Lan Hoa; Lie Mu Lhan; Lie Ying Hoa	4:53.8
4 × 100 m medley relay	Japan; Satoko Tanaka; Noriko Yamamoto; Eiko Takahashi; Yoshiko Sato	4:53.7; GR	Indonesia; Oey Lian Nio; Iris Tobing; Lie Lan Hoa; Enny Nuraeni	5:13.1	Philippines; Tessie Lozada; Dolores Agustin; Gertrudes Lozada; Haydee Coloso-Espino	5:20.1

== Medal table ==
Rank	Nation	Gold	Silver	Bronze	Total
1	Japan (JPN)	19	16	3	38
2	Burma (BIR)	2	0	1	3
3	Indonesia (INA)	0	3	6	9
4	Philippines (PHI)	0	2	10	12
5	South Korea (KOR)	0	0	1	1
Totals (5 entries)		21	21	21	63
