= Quitoriano =

Quitoriano is a surname. Notable people with the surname include:

- Raymundo Quitoriano (born 1933), Filipino sports shooter
- Teagan Quitoriano (born 2000), American football player
