= Veronika Holletz =

German swimmer

Personal information
- Born: June 25, 1945 (age 81) Berlin, Germany

Sport
- Sport: Swimming
Medal record
Representing East Germany
European Championships
Bronze medal – third place	1962 Leipzig	100 m backstroke

Veronika Holletz (born 25 June 1945) is a retired East German swimmer who won the bronze medal in the 100m backstroke at the 1962 European Aquatics Championships. She also participated in the 1964 Summer Olympics as a member of the United Team of Germany and finished fourth in the 400m medley.
