= Satoru Nakano =

Japanese swimmer (born 1947)

Personal information
- Born: 9 January 1947 (age 79) Hiroshima, Japan
- Height: 178 cm (5 ft 10 in)
- Weight: 82 kg (181 lb)

Sport
- Sport: Swimming
Medal record
Representing Japan
Summer Universiade
Bronze medal – third place	1967 Tokyo	4x100m freestyle relay
Bronze medal – third place	1967 Tokyo	4x200m freestyle relay

Satoru Nakano (中野 悟, Nakano Satoru; born 9 January 1947) is a Japanese former swimmer. He competed at the 1964 Summer Olympics and the 1968 Summer Olympics.
