= Helga Zimmermann =

German swimmer

Personal information
- Born: 2 November 1942 (age 83) Königsberg, East Prussia, Germany (Kaliningrad, Russia)

Sport
- Sport: Swimming

Helga Zimmermann (born 2 November 1942) is a German former swimmer. She competed in the women's 400 metre individual medley at the 1964 Summer Olympics.
