= Jin Jang-rim =

South Korean swimmer (born 1942)

Personal information
- Nationality: South Korean
- Born: 15 October 1942 (age 83)

Sport
- Sport: Swimming
Medal record
Representing South Korea
Asian Games
Bronze medal – third place	1962 Jakarta	100m breaststroke

Jin Jang-rim (born 15 October 1942) is a South Korean former breaststroke swimmer. He competed in the men's 200 metre breaststroke at the 1964 Summer Olympics.
