= Harriet Blank =

German swimmer

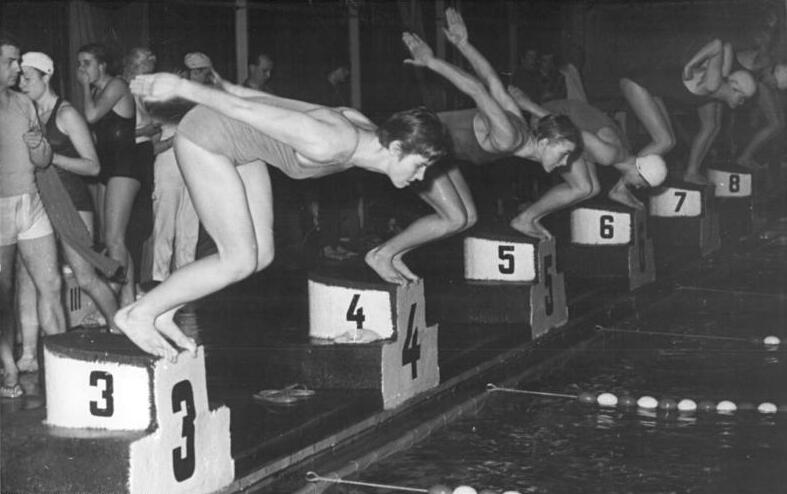
- Harriet Blank (lane number "4") just the start of a swimming race in 1963

Personal information
- Born: 26 October 1944 (age 81) Leipzig, Germany

Sport
- Sport: Swimming

Harriet Blank (born 26 October 1944) is a German former swimmer. She competed in the women's 400 metre individual medley at the 1964 Summer Olympics.
