= Jane Cortis =

Australian swimmer

Personal information
- Born: 21 June 1948 (age 78)

Sport
- Sport: Swimming

Jane Cortis (born 21 June 1948) is an Australian former swimmer. She competed in the women's 400 metre individual medley at the 1964 Summer Olympics. She finished fifth in her heat, and did not reach the final.
