= Yoshiko Sato =

Japanese swimmer (born 1938)

Personal information
- Born: March 30, 1938 (age 88) Gojyo, Nara Prefecture, Japan
- Height: 1.59 m (5 ft 3 in)
- Weight: 55 kg (121 lb)

Sport
- Sport: Swimming
Medal record
Representing Japan
Asian Games
Bronze medal – third place	1954 Manila	400 m freestyle
Gold medal – first place	1958 Tokyo	100 m freestyle
Gold medal – first place	1958 Tokyo	200 m freestyle
Gold medal – first place	1958 Tokyo	4×100 m freestyle
Gold medal – first place	1962 Jakarta	100 m freestyle
Gold medal – first place	1962 Jakarta	200 m freestyle
Gold medal – first place	1962 Jakarta	4×100 m freestyle
Gold medal – first place	1962 Jakarta	4×100 m medley

Yoshiko Sato (佐藤 喜子, Satō Yoshiko; born March 30, 1938) is a retired Japanese freestyle swimmer who won seven gold medals at the Asian Games in 1958–1962. She competed at the 1956 and 1960 Olympics in five sprint events in total with the best result of seventh place in the 4×100 m medley relay.

Nationally Sato won four consecutive titles in the 100 m (1958–1961) and seven consecutive titles in the 200 m (1955–1961). From 1954 to 1962 she set 97 national records in freestyle events ranging from 50 to 1500 m, which remains an all-time record on its own.

In 1963, Sato retired from competitions and next year married Yoshihiko Osaki, a fellow swimmer who also competed at the 1960 Olympics. She took his last name and since then is known as Yoshiko Osaki. She resumed competing in 1984, in the masters category. Since 1985 she took part in all World and Pan Pacific championships, winning 20 world and 17 Pan Pacific titles and setting 93 world records in the freestyle, butterfly and medley events. She also set 104 national masters records and won 123 national titles. In 2005, she was inducted into the International Swimming Hall of Fame, in the masters category.

Her late husband was also an avid masters swimmer and chairman of the Japanese Masters Swimming Association. The couple had a son and two daughters.
