= Sharon Finneran =

American swimmer (born 1946)

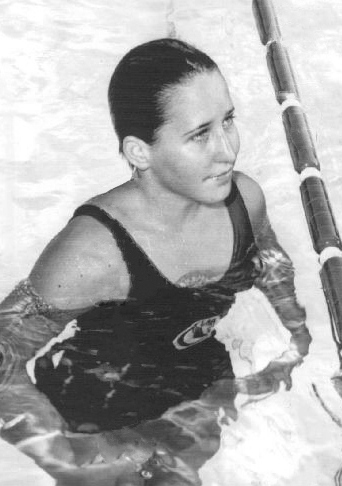
- Finneran, age 16, in 1962

Personal information
- Full name: Sharon Evans Finneran
- National team: United States
- Born: February 4, 1946 (age 80) Rockville Centre, New York, U.S.
- Height: 5 ft 3 in (1.60 m)
- Weight: 110 lb (50 kg)

Sport
- Sport: Swimming
- Strokes: Individual medley Butterfly; Freestyle
- Club: LA Athletic Club; Santa Clara Swim Club
- College team: University of Southern California; Briefly with Men's team
- Coach: Peter Daland (LAAC); George Haines (SCSC)
Medal record
Representing the United States
Olympic Games
Silver medal – second place	1964 Tokyo	400 m medley
Pan American Games
Gold medal – first place	1963 São Paulo	400 m freestyle

Sharon Evans Finneran (born February 4, 1946), also known by her married name Sharon Rittenhouse, is an American former Hall of Fame competitive swimmer, and was a 1964 Olympic silver medalist in the 400-meter individual medley, having set a world record in the event in 1962. She also set world records in the 200-meter butterfly, and 200-meter breaststroke, making her the first woman to hold world records in three events.

== Early life and swimming ==
Sharon, far left, age 11

Born in Rockville Center New York in February 1946, Sharon grew up in the Redington Beach area on Florida's Gulf coast, though she would later live in South Florida. Her parents included a swimmer and diver, and two of her grandparents had been accomplished divers. Sharon was competing in swimming by age 10 with the Tampa Bay Club, along with several of her siblings, and received a first place in the 100-meter individual medley in July 1956 at the Junior Olympic Swimming Trials. In 1957, Sharon was rated third Nationally in the 220-yard IM, and fourth in the 110-yard freestyle. After moving to South Florida, she swam with the Coral Gables Swimming Association, where at 12 she broke a National age group record in the 100-meter butterfly with a 1:30.0 at Oak Ridge Tennessee, in August, 1958. Known for her ability, and stroke diversity at only 14, she placed 8th in the 400-meter Individual Medley at the 1960 Olympic Trials.

=== Move to Los Angeles ===
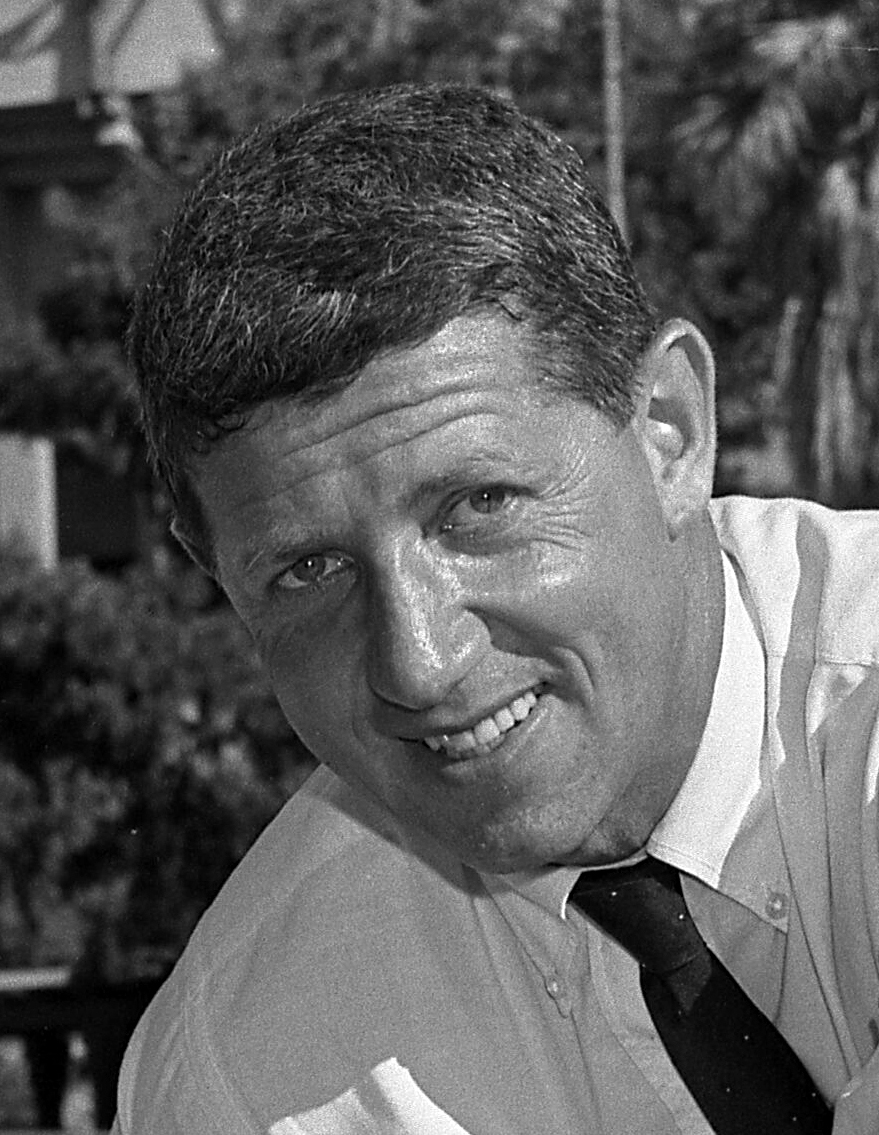
Coach Peter Daland '64

Aware that the top swimming programs were in California, Sharon's mother Carolyn moved her and her five siblings to Los Angeles in January 1962. Sharon began swimming for the Los Angeles Athletic Club (LAAC) under Hall of Fame Head Coach Peter Daland. All of her siblings, four boys and a girl, swam or competed in diving for the LAAC as well. Through her Junior year, she attended John Marshall High School in Los Angeles, with fellow Los Angeles Athletic Club swimming standout Carolyn House who was a year ahead of her at John Marshall.

== 1962-3 World Records - 400m IM, 200m Fly, 200m Breast ==
At 15, swimming with the Los Angeles Athletic Club, Sharon broke the standing world record for the 400-meter individual medley on July 28, 1962, before a crowd of 10,000 with a time of 5:21.9 at the Japanese National Swimming Championships, winning over rival and friend Donna DeVarona. Sharon's record time would be challenged and surpassed by the 1964 Olympics. At the August 19, 1962 National AAU Outdoor Championships, Sharon won the 200-meter butterfly, setting a new world record of 2:31.2, and later bettered her own record with a 2:30.9. By age 16, Sharon also held a world record in the 200-meter breaststroke, becoming the first woman to hold a world record in three events.

After Sharon's mother Carolyn found a new job and moved the family North to Santa Clara, California in 1963, Sharon began swimming for nationally known Santa Clara High School and the Santa Clara Swim Club, an exceptional age-group program under Hall of Fame Head Coach George Haines. She excelled in a variety of strokes and events but specialized in IM, distance freestyle, and butterfly. In February 1964, likely anticipating Olympic competition that summer, she represented the Santa Clara Swim Club, and broke the American record in the 400-yard individual medley with a 4:47.1. She continued to swim with the Santa Clara Swim Club through at least 1967.

== 1963 Pan Am Games ==
Sharon took a gold medal in the 1963 Pan Am Games in São Paulo, Brazil, swimming the 400-meter individual medley in a Pan Am record time of 4:52.7, which helped the American team pull far ahead in total points. After the Pan Am Games, Sharon worked to build greater endurance, often completing three practices a day, and became known for her work ethic.

== '64 Olympic Trials ==
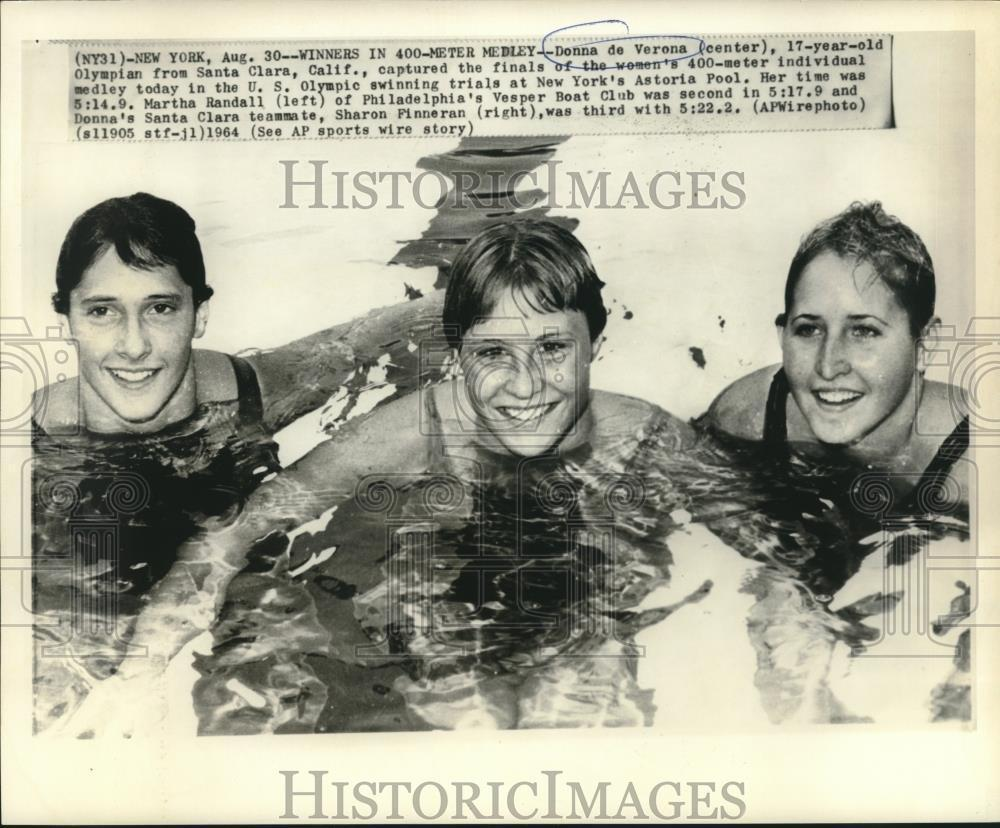
(l to r) M. Randall, D. de Varona, S. Finneran at 1964 Olympic Trials

At the August 1964 Olympic Trials in Astoria, New York, she swam her signature event, the 400-meter individual medley with a time of 5:22.2 in the finals, but was edged out by Santa Cruz Swim Club Teammate Donna DeVarona and Vesper Boat Club's Martha Randall. Her third-place finish was adequate, however, to ensure an Olympic spot in 1964 and was around six seconds behind second place Randall's time of 5:17.9. DeVarona's winning time in the trials of 5:14.9 was a new World Record, and bettered her former world record. Though Sharon had excelled in the 400-meter IM for over two years, 1964 was the first year the event was offered in the Olympics, and several of Sharon's most outstanding events were not offered. Her recent world record in the 800-meter freestyle at Nationals was not yet an event included in Olympic competition.

== 1964 Tokyo Olympics ==
Sharon represented the United States as an 18-year-old at the 1964 Summer Olympics in Tokyo. Finneran received a silver medal for her second-place finish in the women's 400-meter individual medley – completing an all-American sweep of the event with Donna de Varona and Martha Randall. Randall, the third-place finisher was close on her heels, and it took a while to determine Sharon had earned a medal due to the close finish. Sharon was somewhat disappointed at first to take a silver in the 400-meter, as her 1962 record time in the event was significantly faster than the standing world record.

On March 12, 1965, while swimming for the Santa Clara Swim Club, Sharon easily won the 1650-yard freestyle event at the Southern California Invitational Swim Meet at the City of Commerce, California, with a time of 18:30.

Several of Finneran's other best events, long-distance freestyle and the 200 butterfly were not Women's Olympic events in 1964.

== Career swimming achievements ==
Most of her early recorded amateur club competition prior to the age of 17-18 was with the Los Angeles Athletic Club, under Peter Daland who was coaching at USC when she attended. In her Olympic event, Sharon won the 400 IM AAU titles in indoor and outdoor competition. As expected from a World Record holder, she twice won the AAU 200-meter butterfly in outdoor competition, and in distance freestyle won the AAU indoor title for the 1,650-yard event in 1964. In distance events Sharon set six world and thirteen American Records in the 500-yard and 1650-yard freestyle. She also set records in the 200 butterfly, and 800 freestyle, in both the yard and meter event.

== Attending USC ==
Sharon attended the University of Southern California (USC) in the Los Angeles area on an academic scholarship, and made arrangements to swim with the USC men's team. Because she preferred to continue with the Santa Clara Club team at least in the summers, and not the USC swim coach's club team, the Los Angeles Athletic Club, she was required to practice alone with the recreational lap swimmers at noon, and suffered from a lack of quality training. By age 20 in 1966–7, she had left highly competitive swim training.

=== Life after competitive swimming ===
After retiring from competitive swimming, Finneran took part in United States Masters swimming tournaments in Southern California. She recorded five top ten national age group times in 1980 for the 1, 2 and 400 free, the 50 fly and the 200 individual medley, while swimming for Southern California's Trojan Masters at the age of 34. Her four siblings were competitive swimmers, divers and water polo players. Her brother Mike Finneran placed fifth in springboard diving at the 1972 Summer Olympics, and her daughter Ariel Rittenhouse finished fourth at the 2008 Summer Olympics, also in springboard diving.

Sharon was part of the Torch relay for the 1996 Atlanta Olympics, carrying the torch in Seattle where her mother and two brothers were living.

She worked as a Dental Hygienist after college, and by 1980 was a permanent resident of Santa Clara, where she would stay busy taking care of her family of five children with husband Bob Rittenhouse, a commercial insurance broker.

=== Honors ===
For her World Records in the 400-meter IM, and the 200-meter butterfly, Sharon was voted Southern California's Athlete of the Month in August 1962.

Recognizing her world records in diverse events, and her 1964 Olympic silver medal, in 1981 she was inducted into the International Swimming Hall of Fame.

== See also ==
- List of members of the International Swimming Hall of Fame
- List of Olympic medalists in swimming (women)
- World record progression 200 metres butterfly
- World record progression 400 metres individual medley
- World record progression 800 metres freestyle

Records
Preceded by Donna de Varona; Donna de Varona	Women's 400-meter individual medley world record-holder (long course); July 26, 1962 – July 26, 1962; July 28, 1962 – March 10, 1964	Succeeded by Donna de Varona; Donna de Varona
