= Swimming at the 1964 Summer Olympics – Women's 400 metre individual medley =

Women's 400 metre individual medley at the Games of the XVIII Olympiad
- Venue: Yoyogi National Gymnasium
- Dates: 15 October 1964 (heats); 17 October 1964 (final)
- Competitors: 22 from 12 nations
- Winning time: 4:32.08 OR

Medalists
1st place, gold medalist(s)		Donna de Varona	United States
2nd place, silver medalist(s)		Sharon Finneran	United States
3rd place, bronze medalist(s)		Martha Randall	United States

The women's 400 metre individual medley event at the 1964 Summer Olympics took place on 15–17 October. This swimming event used medley swimming and this was the first time for this event in this distance for the women swimmers. Because an Olympic size swimming pool is 50 metres long, this race consisted of eight lengths of the pool. The first two lengths were swum using the butterfly stroke, the second pair with the backstroke, the third pair of lengths in breaststroke, and the final two were freestyle. Unlike other events using freestyle, swimmers could not use butterfly, backstroke, or breaststroke for the freestyle leg; most swimmers use the front crawl in freestyle events.

== Results ==
=== Heats ===
Heat 1

Rank	Athlete	Country	Time	Note
1	Anita Lonsbrough	Great Britain	5:30.6	
2	Sharon Finneran	United States	5:32.7	
3	Márta Egerváry	Hungary	5:35.8	
4	Helga Zimmermann	Germany	5:38.9	
5	Jane Cortis	Australia	5:43.6	

Heat 2

Rank	Athlete	Country	Time	Note
1	Martha Randall	United States	5:27.8	
2	Barbara Hounsell	Canada	5:38.4	
3	Adrie Lasterie	Netherlands	5:41.3	
4	Harriet Blank	Germany	5:42.4	
5	Isabel Castañe	Spain	5:50.7	
6	Margaret Harding	Puerto Rico	6:10.7	

Heat 3

Rank	Athlete	Country	Time	Note
1	Veronika Holletz	Germany	5:26.8	
2	Betty Heukels	Netherlands	5:32.4	
3	Linda McGill	Australia	5:38.3	
4	Kimiko Ezaka	Japan	5:42.1	
5	Kirsten Strange-Campbell	Denmark	5:44.4	
6	Pamela Johnson	Great Britain	6:11.9	

Heat 4

Rank	Athlete	Country	Time	Note
1	Donna de Varona	United States	5:24.2	
2	Marianne Heemskerk	Netherlands	5:38.6	
3	Helen Kennedy	Canada	5:49.9	
4	Natsuko Matsuda	Japan	5:51.5	
5	Silvia Belmar	Mexico	6:00.7	

=== Final ===
Rank	Athlete	Country	Time	Notes
1	Donna de Varona	United States	5:18.7	OR
2	Sharon Finneran	United States	5:24.1	
3	Martha Randall	United States	5:24.2	
4	Veronika Holletz	United Team of Germany	5:25.6	
5	Linda McGill	Australia	5:28.4	
6	Betty Heukels	Netherlands	5:30.3	
7	Anita Lonsbrough	Great Britain	5:30.5	
8	Márta Egerváry	Hungary	5:38.4	

Key: OR = Olympic record
