= Kenzo Izutsu =

Japanese swimmer (born 1941)

Personal information
- Born: 8 March 1941 Ishikawa, Japan
- Died: 1 January 1984 (aged 42) Tokyo, Japan

Sport
- Sport: Swimming
Medal record
Representing Japan
Asian Games
| Gold medal – first place | 1962 Jakarta | 100m butterfly |
| Gold medal – first place | 1962 Jakarta | 200m butterfly |
| Gold medal – first place | 1962 Jakarta | 4x100m medley relay |

Kenzo Izutsu (井筒 賢造, Izutsu Kenzō; 8 March 1941 – 1 January 1984) was a Japanese former swimmer. He competed in the men's 200 metre butterfly at the 1960 Summer Olympics.
