= Chet Jastremski =

American swimmer (1941–2014)

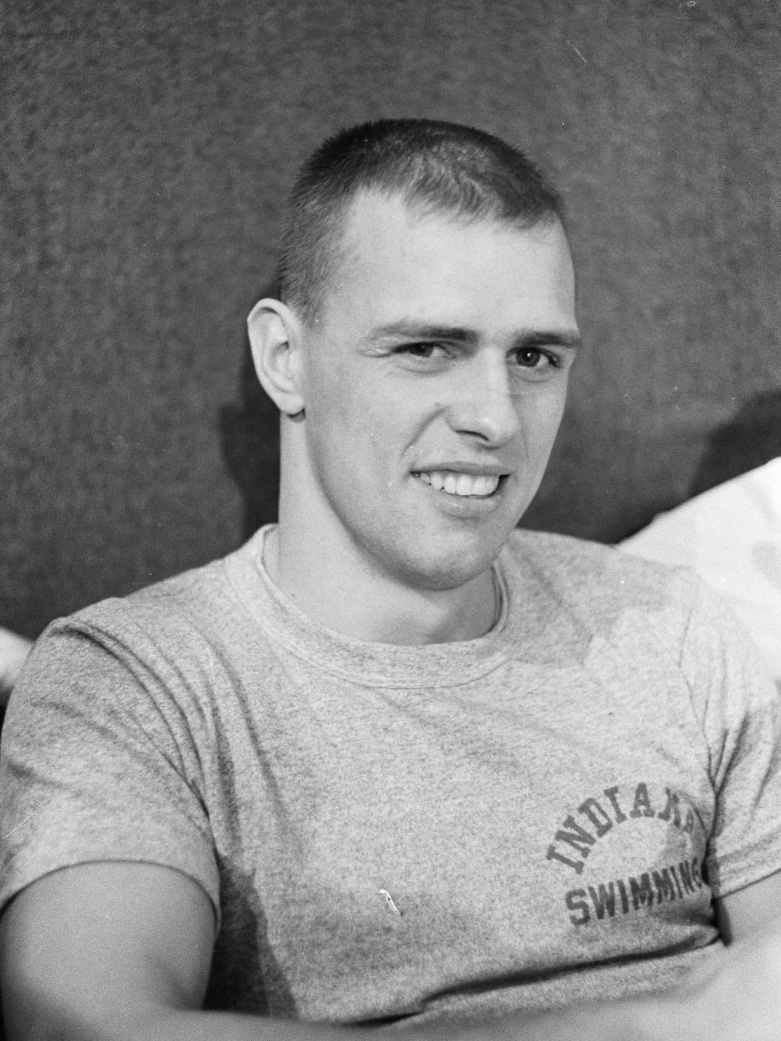
- Jastremski in 1963

Personal information
- Full name: Chester Andrew Jastremski
- Nickname: "Chet"
- National team: United States
- Born: January 12, 1941 Toledo, Ohio, U.S.
- Died: May 3, 2014 (aged 73) Bloomington, Indiana, U.S.
- Occupation: Physician
- Height: 5 ft 9 in (175 cm)
- Weight: 176 lb (80 kg)
- Spouse: Connie Jastremski

Sport
- Sport: Swimming
- Strokes: Breaststroke, individual medley
- Club: Toledo Central YMCA; Glass City Aquatic Club, Toledo; Cincinnati Cokes; Bloomington Swim Club
- College team: Indiana University (IU)
- Coach: Paul Hartlaub (Cincinnati Coca Colas); James "Doc" Counsilman (IU)
Medal record
Men's swimming
Representing United States
Olympic Games
Bronze medal – third place	1964 Tokyo	200 m breaststroke
Pan American Games
Gold medal – first place	1963 São Paulo	200 m breaststroke

Chester Andrew Jastremski (January 12, 1941 – May 3, 2014) was an American competition swimmer, who competed for Indiana University, and was both a 1964 Olympic bronze medalist in breaststroke and an American and world record-holder. Exceptional as a breaststroker, in his career, he set 21 national and 12 world records, and was considered by Sports Illustrated in 1961 as one of the greatest swimmers of his era. Jastremski was the first swimmer to go under one minute for the 100-yard breaststroke. He would later graduate medical school at the Indiana University in 1968 and practice medicine in Bloomington, Indiana, also serving as a swim coach for local teams.

== Early life ==
Chester Jastremski was born January 12, 1941, in Toledo, Ohio to parents Gertrude and Chester Jastremski Sr. Around the age of eight, Chet began swimming for the Toledo Central YMCA where he was coached by Thomas J. Edwards, and competed for the club by the age of nine. A highly accomplished coach, Edwards worked as a physical director and swim coach at the Toledo Central YMCA from 1948 to 1954, and served as an outstanding coach for Kenyon College from 1954 to 1964 where he led Kenyon to conference championships in ten successive years. Chet later attended and swam for Toledo's Catholic all male college preparatory school St. Francis de Sales, graduating in June 1959. By 1957, Jastremski represented Toledo's Glass City Aquatic Club in a few meets. At the April 10–11, 1958, National YMCA Championships, he broke a National YMCA record in the 200-yard butterfly with a YMCA meet record time of 2:14.7, and swam the 200-yard Individual Medley with a meet record time of 2:12. Representing St. Francis de Sales, Jastremski was an All American swimmer in High School and was a National Catholic High School Champion. In his High School Junior and Senior years, Jastremski represented Cincinnati Coca-Colas Swim Club, coached by Paul Hartlaub, and trained with the team during the summers of 1958 and 1959, but continued to attend Toledo's St. Francis de Sales High. Hartlaub also coached the University of Cincinnati men's team.

In his Senior year, Jastremski was widely recruited by a number of schools for his swimming skills including Yale, Notre Dame, Michigan State, Michigan and Ohio State. He initially accepted an invitation to enroll at the University of Cincinnati to swim under his former coach Paul Hartlaub, but decided before the Fall, 1959 semester to swim for Indiana University.

== Indiana University ==
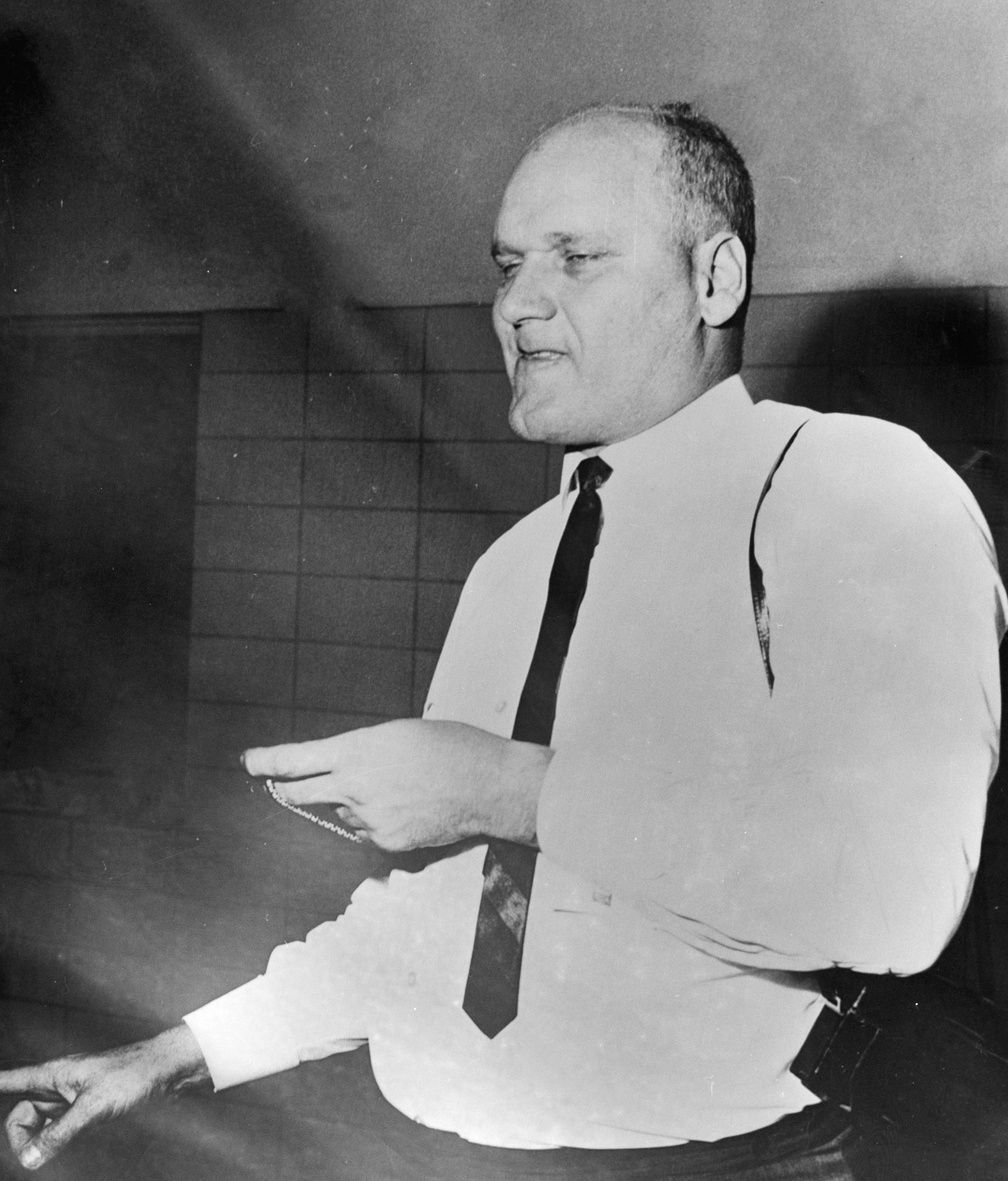
Indiana Coach Counsilman, 1963

Jastremski attended Indiana University in Bloomington on a scholarship, enrolling in the Fall of 1959, where he swam for Hall of Fame Coach Doc Counsilman's Indiana Hoosiers swimming and diving team. An exceptionally strong program, in February 1962, the Indiana swim team had five swimmers who collectively had set eight world records. They included 200 meter backstroke record holder Tom Stock, individual medley swimmer Ted Stickles, and medley relay swimmers Larry Shulholf, and Pete Sintz.

Jastremski may have benefited from Counsilman's own collegiate swimming experiences, as Counsilman competed in both breaststroke and individual medley during his own noteworthy college swimming career at Ohio State. Jastremski swam on the Indiana varsity swim team from 1961 to 1963, serving as a co-captain in 1963, and in his career won a remarkable total of seventeen American Athletic Union titles in the breaststroke, including both individual and medley relay events. Jastremski may have performed well in NCAA competition considering his breaststroke times, but during his tenure as a swimming competitor with Indiana, the team was banned from NCAA national championships due to several recruiting violations by the Indiana football team.

Jastremski and Counsilman helped develop the "whip kick" for breaststroke swimmers to improve on the frog kick, previously used exclusively in the breaststroke. The whip kick minimized drag, thus accentuating the upper body pull made by Jastremski's very powerful shoulders and upper arms. Jastremski was featured on the January 29, 1962 cover of Sports Illustrated. At Indiana, Jastremski swam for three Big 10 regional titles, and was an All-American twelve times.

=== Olympic trial history ===
Jastremski's career spanned a large number of Olympic trials, and he was noted for his longevity as a breaststroke competitor at U.S. Olympic trials. He had rather poor luck being selected for the U.S. Olympic team, however. At the age of only 15, in the Melbourne Olympic trials at Brenan Pools in Detroit in 1956, he won the 200 breaststroke finals, but was disqualified for using what appeared to be a dolphin kick during a push-off from a turn and was not selected for the Olympic team. In 1960, at the Olympic trials for Rome in Detroit, he finished second in his 200-meter event, but was removed from the Olympic team by the U.S. Head Coach, who mistakenly believed they could only take two breaststroke swimmers that year.

His most exceptional year was 1961, when he established new world records in four breaststroke events, resetting his own records a few times in the process.

== 1964 Tokyo, 1968 Mexico City Olympics ==
At the 1964 Summer Olympics in Tokyo, Jastremski represented the United States. He won the bronze medal in the men's 200-meter breaststroke, finishing with a third-place time of 2:29.6. Some have asserted his third-place finish may have been the result of overtraining.

He again qualified for the U.S. team for the 1968 Summer Olympics in Mexico City, and swam for the winning American team in the second preliminary heat of the men's 4×100-meter medley relay, where his preliminary heat team swam a combined time of 4:03.4, winning their preliminary heat. Later, the American 4x100 finals team won the event with a combined time of 3:54.9, but Jastremski did not receive a medal, as he did not swim in the finals which was required to receive a medal at the time.

He qualified for the early August 1972 U.S. Olympic swimming trials in Chicago, but did not make the team nor attend the Olympics.

=== Post competition careers ===
Entering around the Fall of 1964, Jastremski received his medical degree from Indiana University in 1968, where he was also a member of Sigma Nu fraternity. He served as a doctor with the U.S. Army through around 1972, completing his stint with the military from 1968 to 1972, with one year in Texas, and the remaining three at West Point. He was a family practice physician, first establishing his medical practice around 1972 in Bloomington after completing his army service. Continuing to help with the American Olympic team, he was a member of the 1976 U.S. Olympic medical team. He served as a physician for around 35 years before rheumatoid arthritis led him to retire permanently in 2010. Jastremski took a hiatus from his medical practice around 1979, and for a period taught kinesiology at Indiana University and coached swimming before returning to his medical practice around 1991.

He coached the Bloomington Swim Club as well as the North swim team for boys in Bloomington. He coached the women's team at Indiana University from around 1987–1991. After his time coaching, he returned to practicing medicine from 1991 to 2010.

=== Honors ===
In 2007, he was inducted into the National Polish-American Sports Hall of Fame. Recognized by his alma mater, in 1983, he became a member of the Indiana University Athletic Hall of Fame. He received the rarer distinction of being inducted into the International Swimming Hall of Fame in 1977.

He died on May 3, 2014, aged 73, at Indiana University's Hospice in Bloomington, after battling cancer, arthritis, and Parkinson's disease. His survivors included wife Connie Jastremski, children Kelly, Andrea and Ted Jastremski, step children, and numerous grandchildren.

== See also ==
- List of members of the International Swimming Hall of Fame
- List of Indiana University (Bloomington) people
- List of Olympic medalists in swimming (men)
- World record progression 100 metres breaststroke
- World record progression 200 metres breaststroke
- World record progression 4 × 100 metres medley relay
