= Toyoko Kimura =

Japanese swimmer (born 1946)

Personal information
- Born: 29 March 1946 (age 80)

Sport
- Sport: Swimming
Medal record
Representing Japan
Asian Games
Gold medal – first place	1962 Jakarta	400m freestyle
Gold medal – first place	1962 Jakarta	4x100m freestyle relay
Silver medal – second place	1962 Jakarta	100m freestyle

Toyoko Kimura (木村 トヨ子, Kimura Toyoko; born 29 March 1946) is a Japanese former freestyle swimmer. She competed in two events at the 1964 Summer Olympics.
