= Kazue Hayakawa =

Japanese swimmer (born 1947)

Personal information
- Born: 13 June 1947 (age 79)

Sport
- Sport: Swimming
- Strokes: freestyle
Medal record
Representing Japan
Asian Games
Gold medal – first place	1966 Bangkok	400m freestyle
Gold medal – first place	1966 Bangkok	4x100m freestyle relay
Silver medal – second place	1962 Jakarta	400m freestyle
Bronze medal – third place	1966 Bangkok	200m freestyle

Kazue Hayakawa (早川 一枝, Hayakawa Kazue; born 13 June 1947) is a Japanese former freestyle swimmer.

She competed in the women's 400 metre freestyle at the 1964 Japan Summer Olympics. She also competed in the 1962 4th Asian Games in Indonesia and the 1966 5th Asian Games in Thailand.
