= Masami Nakabo =

Japanese swimmer (born 1941)

Personal information
- Born: 11 May 1941 (age 85) Wakayama, Japan

Sport
- Sport: Swimming
- Strokes: freestyle
Medal record
Representing Japan
Asian Games
Bronze medal – third place	1962 Jakarta	400m freestyle

Masami Nakabo (中坊 雅美, Nakabō Masami; born 11 May 1941) is a Japanese former swimmer. He competed in the men's 1500 metre freestyle at the 1960 Summer Olympics.
