= Katsuji Ito =

Japanese swimmer (born 1946)

Personal information
- Born: 8 October 1946 (age 79) Niigata, Japan

Sport
- Sport: Swimming
Medal record
Representing Japan
Summer Universiade
Bronze medal – third place	1967 Tokyo	1500m freestyle
Asian Games
Gold medal – first place	1966 Bangkok	4x200m freestyle relay
Silver medal – second place	1966 Bangkok	1500m freestyle

Katsuji Ito (伊藤 勝二, Itō Katsuji; born 8 October 1946) is a Japanese former swimmer. He competed in the men's 1500 metre freestyle at the 1968 Summer Olympics.
