= Rolando Landrito =

Filipino swimmer (born 1945)

Personal information
- Born: 23 September 1945 (age 80)

Sport
- Sport: Swimming
Medal record
Representing Philippines
Asian Games
Bronze medal – third place	1962 Jakarta	200m breaststroke

Rolando Landrito (born 23 September 1945) is a Filipino former swimmer. He competed in the men's 200 metre breaststroke at the 1964 Summer Olympics.
