= Natsuko Matsuda =

Japanese swimmer

Personal information
- Born: 19 June 1947 (age 79)

Sport
- Sport: Swimming

Natsuko Matsuda (松田 奈津子, Matsuda Natsuko; born 19 June 1947) is a Japanese former swimmer. She competed in the women's 400 metre individual medley at the 1964 Summer Olympics.
