= Wayne Anderson (swimmer) =

American swimmer (born 1945)

Personal information
- Full name: Wayne Robert Anderson
- National team: United States
- Born: April 4, 1945 (age 81) Rockville Centre, New York, U.S.
- Height: 5 ft 9 in (1.75 m)
- Weight: 154 lb (70 kg)

Sport
- Sport: Swimming
- Strokes: Breaststroke
- Club: Santa Clara Swim Club
- College team: University of Southern California
Medal record
Men's swimming
Representing the United States
Summer Universiade
Bronze medal – third place	1965 Budapest	200 m breaststroke

Wayne Robert Anderson (born April 4, 1945) is an American former competition swimmer.

Anderson represented the United States as a 19-year-old at the 1964 Summer Olympics in Tokyo. He competed in the men's 200-meter breaststroke, and finished seventh overall in the event final with a time of 2:35.0.

Anderson attended the University of Southern California (USC), where he swam for the USC Trojans swimming and diving team in National Collegiate Athletic Association (NCAA) competition from 1965 to 1967. He was a six-time All-American as a college swimmer—three straight years in both the 100-yard and 200-yard breaststroke.

== See also ==
- List of University of Southern California people
