= Amnon Krauz =

Israeli swimmer

Amnon Krauz אמנון קראו
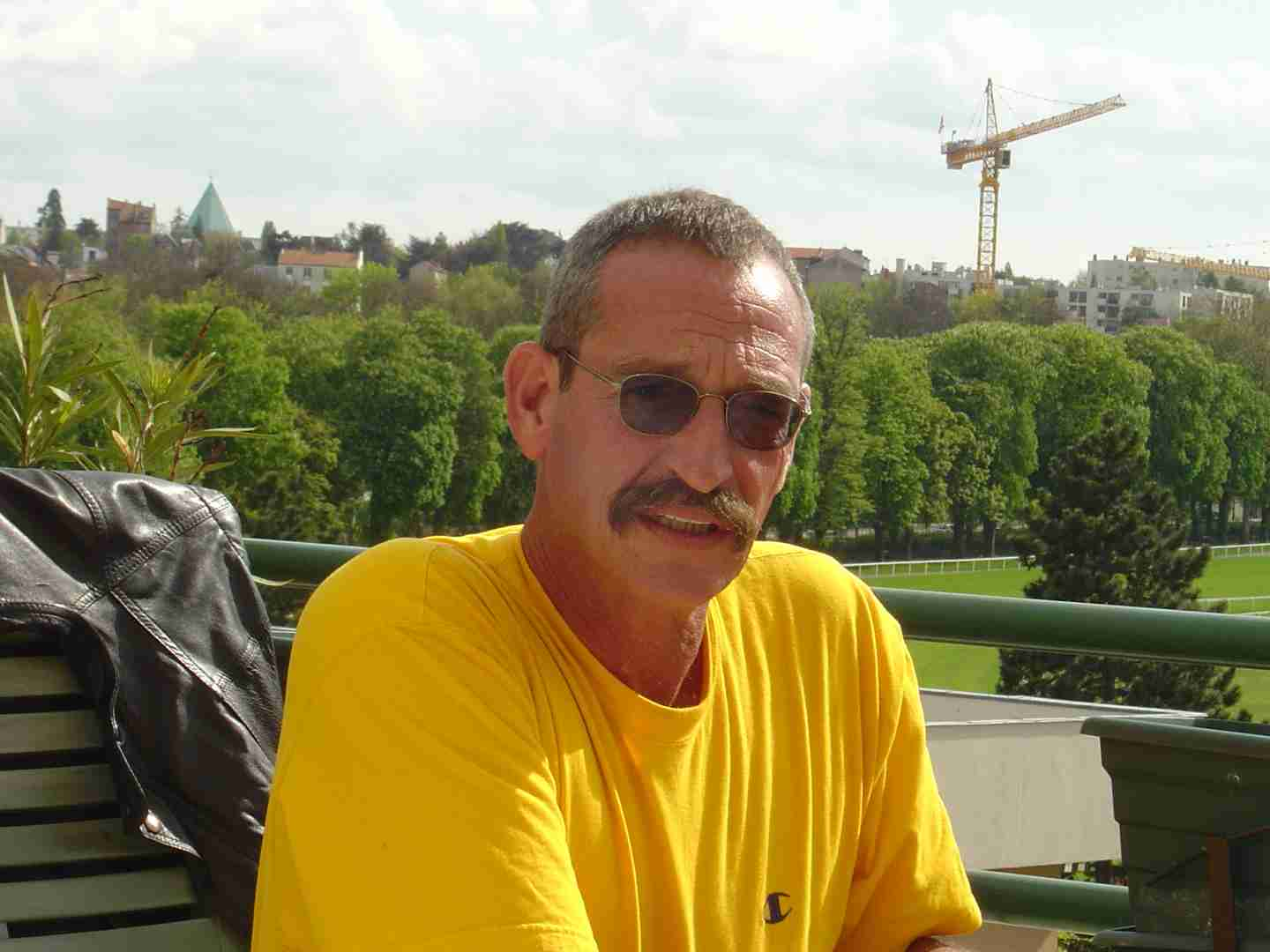

Personal information
- Nationality: Israeli
- Born: August 10, 1952 (age 73) Israel

Sport
- Sport: Swimming
- Strokes: freestyle

Amnon Krauz (Hebrew: אמנון קראו; born August 10, 1952) is an Israeli former Olympic swimmer. He was born in Petah Tikva, Israel.

== Swimming career ==
Krauz competed for Israel at the 1968 Summer Olympics in Mexico City, Mexico, at the age of 16. In the Men's 100 metre Freestyle he came in 6th in Heat 9 with a time of 57.2, and in the Men's 200 metre Freestyle he came in 5th in Heat 2 with a time of 2:09.3. At the time that he competed in the Olympics, he was 6 feet 2 inches (188 cm) tall and weighed 165 pounds (75 kg).
