= Miwako Kobayashi =

Japanese swimmer (born 1952)

Personal information
- Born: 27 January 1952 (age 74) Aichi, Japan

Sport
- Sport: Swimming
Medal record
Representing Japan
Asian Games
Gold medal – first place	1966 Bangkok	4x100m freestyle relay
Bronze medal – third place	1966 Bangkok	400m freestyle

Miwako Kobayashi (小林 美和子, Kobayashi Miwako; born 27 January 1952) is a Japanese former swimmer. She competed in three events at the 1968 Summer Olympics.
