= Georgy Prokopenko =

Soviet swimmer (1937–2021)

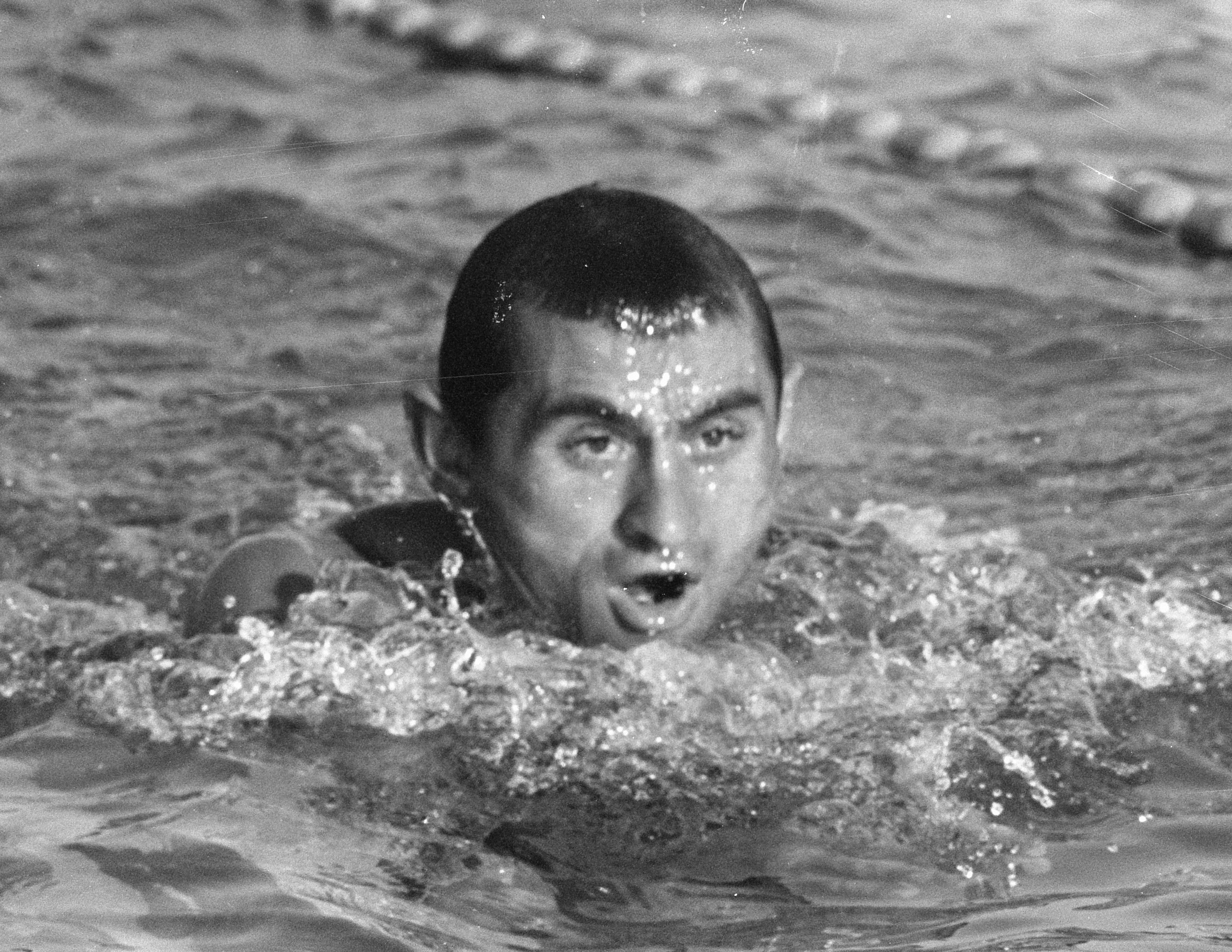
- Prokopenko in 1966

Personal information
- Born: 21 February 1937 Kobeliaky, Poltava Oblast, Ukrainian SSR, Soviet Union
- Died: 5 May 2021 (aged 84)
- Height: 1.80 m (5 ft 11 in)
- Weight: 71 kg (157 lb)

Sport
- Sport: Swimming
- Club: Dynamo Lviv
Medal record
Representing the Soviet Union
Summer Olympics
Silver medal – second place	1964 Tokyo	200 m breaststroke
European Championships
Gold medal – first place	1962 Leipzig	4×100 m medley
Gold medal – first place	1962 Leipzig	200 m breaststroke
Gold medal – first place	1966 Utrecht	200 m breaststroke

Georgy Yakovlevich Prokopenko (Russian: Георгий Яковлевич Прокопенко, Ukrainian: Георгій Якович Прокопенко; 21 February 1937 – 5 May 2021) was a Soviet swimmer who competed at the 1960 and 1964 Summer Olympics. In 1964 he won a silver medal in the 200 m breaststroke and finished fourth in the 4 × 100 m medley relay. He won three European titles in these events in 1962 and 1966, and set two world records in the 100 m breaststroke in 1964. Between 1962 and 1964 he also set eight European records in the 4 × 100 m medley relay and in the 100 m and 200 m breaststroke disciplines.

Prokopenko was born on 21 February 1937 in Kobeliaky, Poltava Oblast, then part of the Ukrainian Soviet Socialist Republic, in the Soviet Union. He died on 5 May 2021 at the age of 84.
