= Huỳnh Văn Hải =

Vietnamese swimmer

Personal information
- Born: 20 August 1940 (age 85)

Sport
- Sport: Swimming

Huỳnh Văn Hải (born 20 August 1940) is a Vietnamese former swimmer. He competed in the men's 200 metre breaststroke at the 1964 Summer Olympics.
