= Yoshiko Morizane =

Japanese swimmer (born 1948)

Personal information
- Born: 4 September 1948 (age 77)

Sport
- Sport: Swimming
Medal record
Representing Japan
Asian Games
| Gold medal – first place | 1966 Bangkok | 100m breaststroke |
| Gold medal – first place | 1966 Bangkok | 4x100m medley relay |
| Silver medal – second place | 1966 Bangkok | 200m breaststroke |

Yoshiko Morizane (森実 芳子, Morizane Yoshiko; born 4 September 1948) is a Japanese former swimmer. She competed in the women's 200 metre breaststroke at the 1964 Summer Olympics.
