= Rudolf Brack =

Swiss swimmer

Personal information
- Born: 15 May 1941 (age 85)

Sport
- Sport: Swimming

Rudolf Brack (born 15 May 1941) is a Swiss former swimmer. He competed in the men's 200 metre breaststroke at the 1964 Summer Olympics.
