= Avraham Melamed (swimmer) =

Israeli swimmer

Personal information
- Native name: אברהם מלמד
- Born: 29 May 1944 (age 82) Tiberias, Israel

Sport
- Sport: Swimming
Medal record
Representing Israel
Asian Games
Silver medal – second place	1966 Bangkok	100m butterfly
Silver medal – second place	1966 Bangkok	4x100m medley relay

Avraham Melamed (Hebrew: אברהם מלמד; born 29 May 1944) is an Israeli former swimmer. He competed for Israel at the 1964 and 1968 Summer Olympics. Representing Israel at the 1966 Asian Games in Bangkok, Thailand, he won silver medals in the 100 m butterfly and the 4 × 100 m medley relay. He studied at the West Liberty University and was inducted into their swimming Hall of Fame in 1995.
