= Achmad Dimyati =

Indonesian swimmer (born 1938)

Personal information
- Born: 3 December 1938 (age 87) Jakarta, Indonesia

Sport
- Sport: Swimming
Medal record
Men's swimming
Representing Indonesia
Asian Games
Bronze medal – third place	1962 Jakarta	100 m freestyle
Bronze medal – third place	1962 Jakarta	4x100 m medley relay

Achmad Dimyati (born 3 December 1938) is an Indonesian former swimmer. He competed in the men's 100 metre freestyle at the 1960 Summer Olympics.
