= Tom Trethewey =

American former competition swimmer (born 1944)

Personal information
- Full name: Thomas George Trethewey
- Nickname: "Tom"
- National team: United States
- Born: May 8, 1944 (age 82) Gary, Indiana, U.S.
- Height: 6 ft 1 in (1.85 m)
- Weight: 170 lb (77 kg)
- Spouse: Bettimay Graffius (1967)

Sport
- Sport: Swimming
- Strokes: Breaststroke
- Club: Indianapolis Athletic Club; Santa Clara Swim Club
- College team: Indiana University
- Coach: James Counsilman (Indiana U.)

Thomas George Trethewey (born May 8, 1944) is an American former competition swimmer who set an American record in the 100-breaststroke and competed for Indiana University. He participated in the 1964 Tokyo Olympics in the 100-meter breaststroke event.

Thomas George Trethewey was born in Northern Indiana's Gary on May 8, 1944, to Mr. and Mrs. William A. Trethewey. He swam for Mt. Lebanon High School in Pittsburgh, Pennsylvania. As early as March 1960, Trethewey was winning events for the Mt. Lebanon Aquatic club, where he swam on a 200-yard medley relay team that set a national record of 1:49.9, and also won the 100-yard butterfly with a time of 1:01.1, and the 100-yard breaststroke with a time of 1:05.8.

In 1962 while a Senior at Mount Lebanon High, he held a Pennsylvania State record in the 100-yard breaststroke with a time of 1:02.8.

In club swimming, he trained and competed first with the Mt. Lebanon swim club, and later for the Indianapolis Athletic Club. He may have trained briefly with coach George Haines of the Santa Clara Swim Club.

== Indiana University ==
He attended Indiana University, where he swam for coach Doc Counsilman's Indiana Hoosiers swimming and diving team in National Collegiate Athletic Association (NCAA) competition from 1963 to 1965. Trethewey was a 200-yard breaststroke champion for the NCAA in 1965 with a new record time of 2:10.4. He was part of a medley relay team for Indiana that won the 1965 National Collegiate Championship.

On July 28, 1963, at the Indiana AAU Outdoor Championships in Indianapolis, Trethewey won the 200-yard breaststroke with a time of 2:37.4, defeating former world record holder Chet Jastremski.

== 1964 Tokyo Olympics ==
Trethewey represented the United States at the 1964 Summer Olympics in Tokyo where was he was managed and trained by his former collegiate coach James "Doc" Counsilman. He competed in the semifinals of the men's 200-meter breaststroke, recording the ninth-best overall time of 2:34.5.

After graduating Indiana, Trethewey joined the U.S. Navy and served as a fighter pilot.

On September 1, 1967, he married Bettimay Graffius at the Shannon Castle Methodist Church in greater Pittsburgh, Pennsylvania.

=== Honors ===
Trethewey was an inductee of the Pennsylvania Aquatics Hall of Fame in March, 2025.

== See also ==
- List of Indiana University (Bloomington) people
