= Kenjiro Matsumoto =

Japanese swimmer

Personal information
- Born: 23 September 1943 (age 82)

Sport
- Sport: Swimming

Kenjiro Matsumoto (松本 健次郎, Matsumoto Kenjirō; born 23 September 1943) is a Japanese former swimmer. He competed in the men's 200 metre breaststroke at the 1964 Summer Olympics.
