= Joram Shnider =

Israeli swimmer

Personal information
- Native name: יורם שניידר
- Born: 30 October 1941 (age 84)

Sport
- Sport: Swimming
Medal record
Representing Israel
Asian Games
Silver medal – second place	1966 Bangkok	4x100m medley relay

Joram Shnider (Hebrew: יורם שניידר; born 30 October 1941) is an Israeli former swimmer. He competed in two events at the 1960 Summer Olympics.

Coming in at 7th in the 4 x 100 meters Medley Relay and 6th at the 100 metres Backstroke.
