= Kenji Ishikawa =

Japanese swimmer (born 1946)

Personal information
- Born: 10 January 1946 (age 80)

Sport
- Sport: Swimming
Medal record
Representing Japan
Summer Universiade
| Silver medal – second place | 1967 Tokyo | 4x100m medley relay |
| Bronze medal – third place | 1967 Tokyo | 200m breaststroke |
Asian Games
| Gold medal – first place | 1962 Jakarta | 100m breaststroke |
| Gold medal – first place | 1962 Jakarta | 4x100m medley relay |
| Gold medal – first place | 1966 Bangkok | 100m breaststroke |
| Gold medal – first place | 1966 Bangkok | 4x100m medley relay |
| Silver medal – second place | 1962 Jakarta | 200m breaststroke |
| Silver medal – second place | 1966 Bangkok | 200m breaststroke |

Kenji Ishikawa (石川 健二, Ishikawa Kenji; born 10 January 1946) is a Japanese former swimmer. He competed in the men's 4 × 100 metre medley relay with a final rank of fifth at the 1964 Summer Olympics.
