= Ferenc Lenkei =

Hungarian swimmer

Personal information
- Born: 23 March 1946 (age 80) Budapest, Hungary
- Height: 1.78 m (5 ft 10 in)
- Weight: 78 kg (172 lb)

Sport
- Sport: Swimming
- Club: BVSC, Budapest
Medal record
Representing Hungary
European Championships
Bronze medal – third place	1966 Utrecht	4×100 m medley

Ferenc Lenkei (born 23 March 1946) is a retired Hungarian breaststroke swimmer who won a bronze medal in the 4 × 100 m medley relay at the 1966 European Aquatics Championships. He finished sixth in the same event at the 1964 Summer Olympics.
