= Edgar Bond =

Filipino sports shooter (born 1935)

Personal information
- Full name: Edgar Veloso Bond, Jr.
- Born: 25 November 1935 (age 90)

Sport
- Country: Philippines
- Sport: Sports shooting
Medal record
Men's shooting
Representing Philippines
Asian Games
Silver medal – second place	1966 Bangkok	25 m center fire pistol
Bronze medal – third place	1966 Bangkok	25 m center fire pistol team

Edgar Bond (born 25 November 1935) is a Filipino former sports shooter. He competed in the 50 metre pistol event at the 1964 Summer Olympics. He also competed at the 1966 Asian Games and won a silver medal.
