= Keisuke Ito (swimmer) =

Japanese swimmer (1943–2006)

Personal information
- Born: October 29, 1943
- Died: December 5, 2006 (aged 63)

Sport
- Sport: Swimming
Medal record
Representing Japan
Asian Games
Gold medal – first place	1962 Jakarta	200m backstroke
Silver medal – second place	1962 Jakarta	100m backstroke

Keisuke Ito (伊藤 圭祐, Itō Keisuke; 29 October 1943 – 5 December 2006) was a Japanese swimmer who competed in the 1964 Summer Olympics.
