= Isao Nakajima =

Japanese swimmer (born 1941)

Personal information
- Born: 1 February 1941 (age 85)

Sport
- Sport: Swimming
Medal record
Representing Japan
Summer Universiade
Bronze medal – third place	1963 Porto Alegre	200m butterfly
Asian Games
Gold medal – first place	1966 Bangkok	100m butterfly
Gold medal – first place	1966 Bangkok	4x100m medley relay

Isao Nakajima (中島 功, Nakajima Isao; born 1 February 1941) is a Japanese former swimmer. He competed in the men's 4 × 100 metre medley relay at the 1964 Summer Olympics.
