= Benjamin Silva-Netto =

Filipino long-distance runner

Personal information
- Nationality: Filipino
- Born: April 27, 1939 (age 87) Naga, Philippine Commonwealth
- Height: 5 ft 4 in (163 cm)
- Weight: 123 lb (56 kg)

Sport
- Sport: Long-distance running
- Event: Marathon

Benjamin Silva-Netto (born April 27, 1939) is a Filipino long-distance runner. He competed in the marathon at the 1968 Summer Olympics. He is the first Filipino to compete in a marathon event at the Summer Olympics.

== Career ==
Before his participation at the 1968 Summer Olympics, Silva-Netto competed in the first full marathon recorded to be held in the country which took place in Roxas, Capiz. He won the race which took place also in 1968.

By 2012, Silva-Netto is the secretary general of the Philippine Amateur Track and Field Association. He resides in Manila but also spends almost a half a year residing in the United States in New Jersey as an immigrant. He is married and has a single daughter.
