= Willi Messner =

East German swimmer

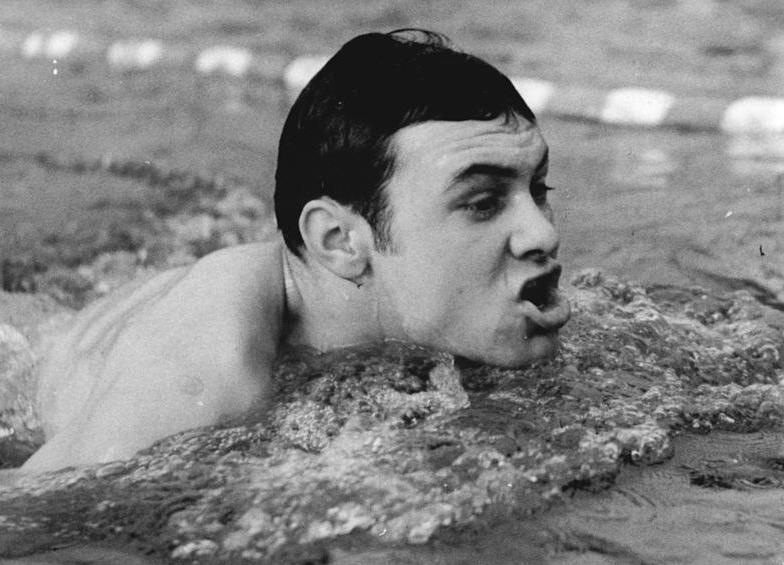
- Willi Messner in 1961

Personal information
- Born: 14 March 1940 (age 86) Gelsenkirchen, Germany
- Height: 1.75 m (5 ft 9 in)
- Weight: 74 kg (163 lb)

Sport
- Sport: Swimming
- Club: SC Dynamo Berlin

Willi Messner (born 14 March 1940) is a retired East German swimmer. In 1964, he won a national title in the 200 m breaststroke and was selected for the 1964 Summer Olympics, but failed to reach the final.
