= Pamela Johnson (swimmer) =

British swimmer

Personal information
- Born: 25 September 1948 (age 77)

Sport
- Sport: Swimming

Pamela Johnson (born 25 September 1948) is a British former swimmer. She competed in the women's 400 metre individual medley at the 1964 Summer Olympics.
