= Rogelio Famatid =

Filipino wrestler

Personal information
- Nationality: Filipino
- Born: 9 December 1943 (age 81); Iloilo City, Philippines

Sport
- Sport: Wrestling

Rogelio Famatid (born 9 December 1943) is a Filipino wrestler. He competed at the 1968 Summer Olympics and the 1972 Summer Olympics.
