= Yasuo Takada =

Japanese swimmer (born 1950)

Personal information
- Nationality: Japanese
- Born: 9 February 1950 (age 76) Miyazaki, Japan

Sport
- Sport: Swimming
Medal record
Representing Japan
Summer Universiade
| Silver medal – second place | 1970 Turin | 200m butterfly |
| Bronze medal – third place | 1970 Turin | 100m butterfly |
Asian Games
| Gold medal – first place | 1966 Bangkok | 200m butterfly |

Yasuo Takada (高田 康雄, Takada Yasuo; born 9 February 1950) is a Japanese former swimmer. He competed in two events at the 1968 Summer Olympics.
