= Noriko Yamamoto =

Japanese swimmer (born 1944)

Personal information
- Born: 26 September 1944 (age 81)

Sport
- Sport: Swimming
- Strokes: Breaststroke
Medal record
Representing Japan
Asian Games
Gold medal – first place	1962 Jakarta	100m breaststroke
Gold medal – first place	1962 Jakarta	200m breaststroke
Gold medal – first place	1962 Jakarta	4×100m medley relay

Noriko Yamamoto (山本 憲子, Yamamoto Noriko; born 26 September 1944) is a Japanese former breaststroke swimmer. She competed in two events at the 1964 Summer Olympics, held in Tokyo, Japan.
