= Eliseo Salugta =

Filipino former wrestler (born 1941)

Personal information
- Nationality: Filipino
- Born: July 29, 1941 (age 85)

Sport
- Sport: Wrestling

Achievements and titles
- Olympic finals: 1968 Summer Olympics, 1972 Summer Olympics

Eliseo Salugta (born 29 July 1941) is a Filipino former wrestler who competed in the 1968 Summer Olympics and in the 1972 Summer Olympics.
