= Cynthia Goyette =

American swimmer (born 1946)

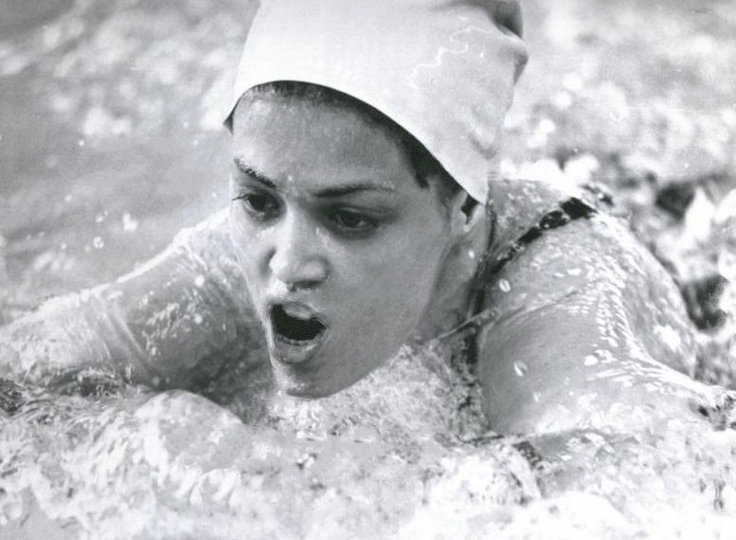

Personal information
- Full name: Cynthia Lee Goyette
- National team: United States
- Born: August 13, 1946 (age 79) Detroit, Michigan, U.S.
- Height: 5 ft 5 in (1.65 m)
- Weight: 115 lb (52 kg)

Sport
- Sport: Swimming
- Strokes: Breaststroke
- Club: Golden Lion Swim Club
Medal record
Women's swimming
Representing the United States
Olympic Games
Gold medal – first place	1964 Tokyo	4x100 m medley
Pan American Games
Gold medal – first place	1963 São Paulo	4x100 m medley
Bronze medal – third place	1967 Winnipeg	100 m breaststroke
Summer Universiade
Gold medal – first place	1967 Tokyo	200 m breaststroke
Gold medal – first place	1967 Tokyo	4x100 m medley
Silver medal – second place	1967 Tokyo	100 m breaststroke

Cynthia Lee Goyette (born August 13, 1946), also known by her married name Cynthia McCulloch, is an American former competition swimmer, Olympic champion, and former world record-holder. She represented the United States as an 18-year-old at the 1964 Summer Olympics in Tokyo. She won a gold medal for swimming the breaststroke leg for the first-place U.S. team in the women's 4 × 100-metre medley relay. The U.S. relay team set a new world record of 4:33.9 in the event final; Goyette's teammates included Cathy Ferguson (backstroke), Sharon Stouder (butterfly), and Kathy Ellis (freestyle).

== See also ==
- List of Olympic medalists in swimming (women)
- World record progression 4 × 100 metres medley relay
