= Aleksandr Tutakayev =

Soviet swimmer

Personal information
- Born: 10 September 1943 (age 82) Tbilisi, Georgian SSR, Soviet Union
- Height: 1.75 m (5 ft 9 in)
- Weight: 70 kg (154 lb)

Sport
- Sport: Swimming
- Club: SKA Tbilisi
Medal record
Representing Soviet Union
European Championships
Silver medal – second place	1966 Utrecht	200 m breaststroke

Aleksandr Tutakayev (Russian: Александр Тутакаев; born 10 September 1943) is a Soviet swimmer who won a silver medal in the 200 m breaststroke at the 1966 European Aquatics Championships. He competed at the 1964 Summer Olympics in the 200 m breaststroke and 4 × 100 m medley relay and finished in fourth place in both events.

Tutakayev lived most of his life in Tbilisi, Georgia, but in the 1990s–2000s moved to Rzhev, Russia, where he works as a swimming coach for children.
