= Wu Tao-yuan =

Taiwanese sports shooter (born 1934)

Personal information
- Born: 吳道源, Pinyin: Wú Dào-yuán; 4 December 1934 (age 91) Shanghai, China

Sport
- Sport: Sports shooting

Wu Tao-yuan (born 4 December 1934) is a Taiwanese former sports shooter. He competed at five Summer Olympics between 1956 and 1972.

== See also ==
- List of athletes with the most appearances at Olympic Games
