= Teruhiko Kitani =

Japanese swimmer (born 1945)

Personal information
- Born: 10 October 1945 (age 80) Hiroshima, Japan

Sport
- Sport: Swimming
Medal record
Men's swimming
Representing Japan
Asian Games
Gold medal – first place	1966 Bangkok	4×200 m freestyle
Silver medal – second place	1966 Bangkok	100 m freestyle

Teruhiko Kitani (木谷 晃彦, Kitani Teruhiko; born 10 October 1945) is a Japanese former freestyle swimmer. He competed in two events at the 1968 Summer Olympics.
