= Yvonne Tobis =

Israeli swimmer (born 1948)

Yvonne Tobis איבונה טוביס
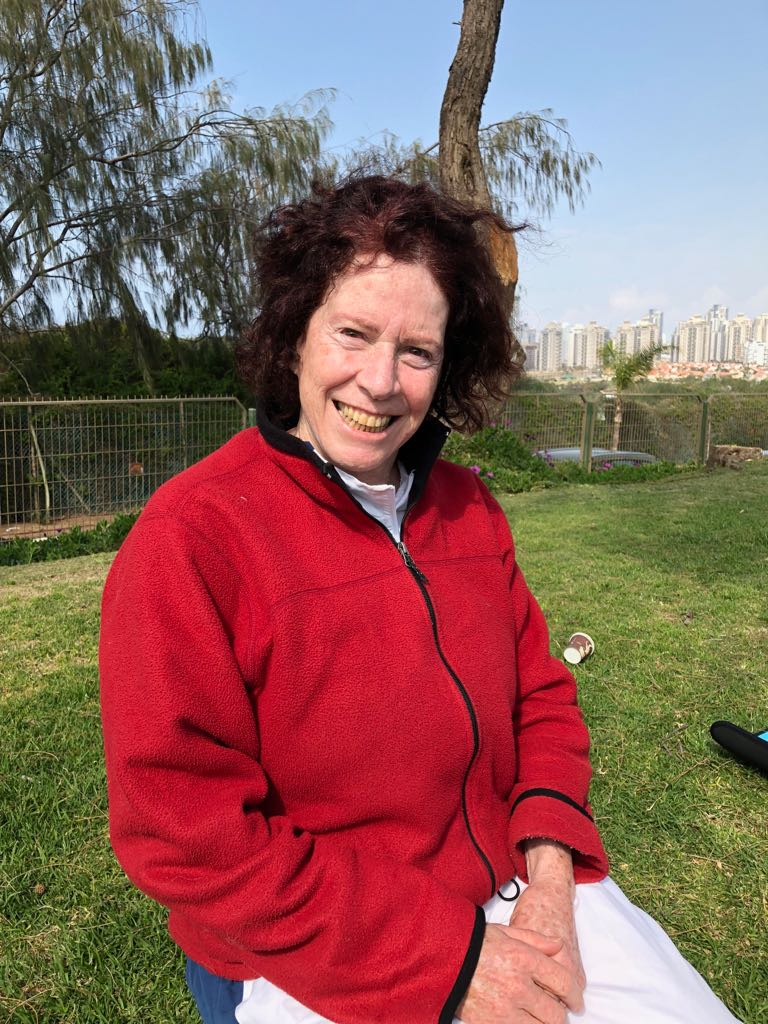
- Tobis in 2018

Personal information
- Nationality: Israeli
- Born: February 5, 1948 (age 78) Bratislava, Czechoslovakia
- Height: 5 ft 6.5 in (168.9 cm)
- Weight: 152 lb (69 kg)

Sport
- Sport: Swimming
- Strokes: 100 m freestyle 100 m butterfly 200 m individual medley 400 m individual medley
Medal record
Women's swimming
Representing Israel
Asian Games
Silver medal – second place	Swimming	1966 Thailand
Bronze medal – third place	Swimming	1966 Thailand

Yvonne Tobis (Hebrew: איבונה טוביס; born February 5, 1948) is an Israeli former Olympic swimmer.

== Early life ==
Tobis was born in Bratislava, Czechoslovakia, and is Jewish. She attended Millfield in Street, Somerset, England, from 1963 to 1966, and is in its Hall of Fame.

== Swimming career ==
At the 1965 Maccabiah Games in Israel, at 17 years of age, Tobis won a gold medal in the 400 m individual medley.

Tobis won a silver medal representing Israel at the 1966 Asian Games in the 200 metre medley, and a bronze medal in 100 metre freestyle.

When she competed in the Olympics she was 5 ft 6.5 in (168.9 cm) tall, and weighed 152 lb (69 kg).

Tobis competed for Israel at the 1968 Summer Olympics in Mexico City, Mexico, at the age of 20 in swimming. In the Women's 100 metre Butterfly she finished 3rd in Heat 3 in a time of 1:12.0, in the Women's 200 metre Individual Medley she finished 4th in heat 1 in a time of 2:41.0, and in the Women's 400 metre Individual Medley she finished 6th in heat 4 in a time of 5:53.8.
