= Bernardo San Juan =

Filipino sports shooter

Personal information
- Nationality: Filipino
- Born: 12 March 1924 Cardona, Rizal, Philippine Islands

Sport
- Country: Philippines
- Sport: Sports shooting
Medal record
Men's shooting
Representing Philippines
Asian Games
Silver medal – second place	1966 Bangkok	50 m rifle 3 positions team

Bernardo San Juan (born 12 March 1924, date of death unknown) was a Filipino sports shooter. He competed at the 1960, 1964 and 1968 Summer Olympics and 1966 Asian Games.
