= Horacio Miranda =

Filipino sports shooter (born 1931)

Personal information
- Nationality: Filipino
- Born: 20 September 1931 (age 94) Manila, Philippine Islands

Sport
- Country: Philippines
- Sport: Sports shooting
Medal record
Men's shooting
Representing Philippines
Asian Games
Silver medal – second place	1966 Bangkok	30 m rapid fire pistol team
Bronze medal – third place	1966 Bangkok	25 m center fire pistol team

Horacio Miranda (born 20 September 1931) is a Filipino former sports shooter. He competed at the 1960 Summer Olympics, 1964 Summer Olympics, the 1968 Summer Olympics and 1962 and 1966 Asian Games.
