= Leopoldo Ang =

Filipino sports shooter (born 1937)

Personal information
- Nationality: Filipino
- Born: December 19, 1937 Manila, Philippines
- Died: November 9, 2013 (aged 75)

Sport
- Country: Philippines
- Sport: Sports shooting
Medal record
Men's shooting
Representing Philippines
Asian Games
Silver medal – second place	1966 Bangkok	50 m rifle 3 positions team
Silver medal – second place	1966 Bangkok	50 m standard rifle 3 positions team
Bronze medal – third place	1966 Bangkok	10 m air rifle team

Leopoldo B. Ang (19 December 1937 - 9 November 2013) is a Filipino former sports shooter. He competed at the 1964 Summer Olympics and the 1968 Summer Olympics. He also competed at the 1966 Asian Games and won three medals in team events.
