= Paterno Miranda =

Filipino sports shooter (born 1930)

Personal information
- Nationality: Filipino
- Born: 24 July 1930 Manila, Philippines

Sport
- Country: Philippines
- Sport: Sports shooting
Medal record
Men's shooting
Representing Philippines
Asian Games
Silver medal – second place	1966 Bangkok	30 m rapid fire pistol team
Bronze medal – third place	1966 Bangkok	30 m rapid fire pistol

Paterno Miranda (born 24 July 1930) is a Filipino former sports shooter. He competed at the 1964 Summer Olympics and the 1968 Summer Olympics. He also competed at the 1966 Asian Games and won two medals.
