= Lodovico Espinosa =

Filipino sports shooter (1926–2006)

Personal information
- Born: 28 April 1926
- Died: 28 February 2006 (aged 79)

Sport
- Sport: Sports shooting

Lodovico Espinosa (28 April 1926 – 28 February 2006) was a Filipino sports shooter. He competed in two events at the 1972 Summer Olympics.
