= Raymundo Quitoriano =

Filipino sports shooter (born 1933)

Personal information
- Born: February 28, 1933 (age 93)

Sport
- Country: Philippines
- Sport: Sports shooting
Medal record
Men's shooting
Representing Philippines
Asian Games
| Silver medal – second place | 1966 Bangkok | 30 m rapid fire pistol team |

Raymundo Quitoriano (born February 28, 1933) is a Filipino former sports shooter. He competed in the skeet event at the 1972 Summer Olympics.

He also participated at the 1966 Asian Games and won the silver medal in rapid fire pistol team event.
