= Tony Asamli =

Filipino swimmer (born 1947)

Personal information
- Born: 16 July 1947 (age 79) Jolo, Philippines

Sport
- Sport: Swimming
Medal record
Representing Philippines
Asian Games
| Silver medal – second place | 1966 Bangkok | 4x200m freestyle relay |
| Bronze medal – third place | 1966 Bangkok | 1500m freestyle |
| Bronze medal – third place | 1966 Bangkok | 400m individual medley |

Tony J. Asamli (born 16 July 1947) is a Filipino former swimmer. He competed in seven events at the 1968 Summer Olympics.
