= Gershon Shefa =

Israeli swimmer

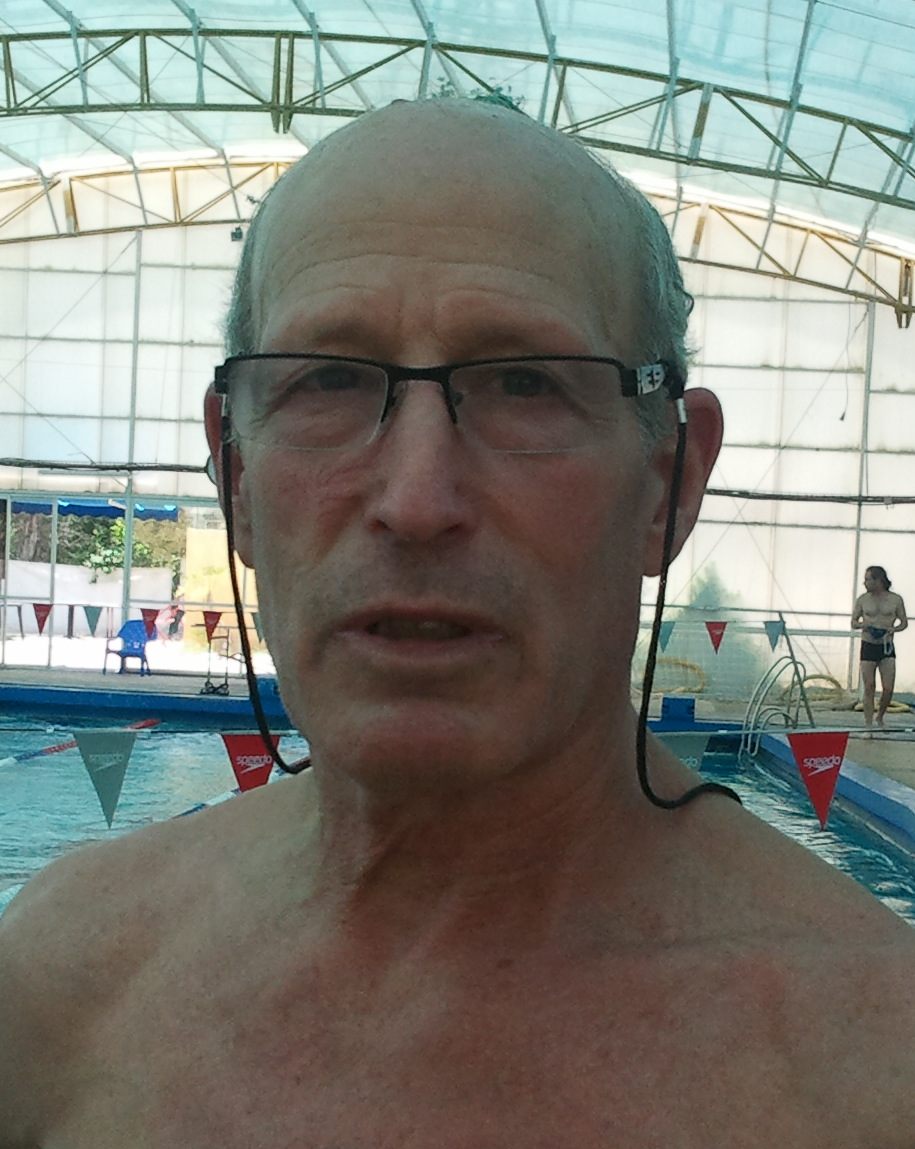
- Gershon Shefa in 2011

Personal information
- Native name: גרשון שפע
- Born: 18 May 1943 (age 83) Petah Tikva, Israel

Sport
- Sport: Swimming
Medal record
Representing Israel
Asian Games
Silver medal – second place	1966 Bangkok	400m individual medley
Silver medal – second place	1966 Bangkok	4x100m medley relay
Bronze medal – third place	1966 Bangkok	200m breaststroke

Gershon Shefa (Hebrew: גרשון שפע; born 18 May 1943) is an Israeli former swimmer. He competed at the 1960, 1964 and the 1968 Summer Olympics.

At the 1965 Maccabiah Games, he won a gold medal in the 200 m breaststroke.
