= Helen Elliott =

Filipino swimmer (born 1949)

Personal information
- Born: 19 September 1949 (age 76) Manila, Philippines

Sport
- Sport: Swimming
Medal record
Representing Philippines
Asian Games
Silver medal – second place	1966 Bangkok	100m freestyle
Silver medal – second place	1966 Bangkok	200m freestyle
Silver medal – second place	1966 Bangkok	400m freestyle
Silver medal – second place	1966 Bangkok	4x100m freestyle relay
Silver medal – second place	1966 Bangkok	4x100m medley relay

Helen Elliott (born 19 September 1949) is a Filipino former swimmer. She competed in four events at the 1968 Summer Olympics.
