= Michiko Kihara =

Japanese swimmer and TV actress

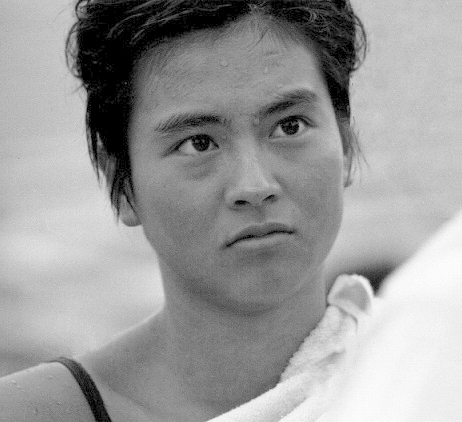
- Michiko Kihara at the 1964 Olympics

Personal information
- Born: April 5, 1948 Akashi, Hyogo, Japan
- Died: October 18, 2007 (aged 59) Hiratsuka, Kanagawa, Japan
- Height: 1.67 m (5 ft 6 in)
- Weight: 59 kg (130 lb)

Sport
- Sport: Swimming
Medal record
Representing Japan
Asian Games
Gold medal – first place	1966 Bangkok	100 m freestyle
Gold medal – first place	1966 Bangkok	200 m freestyle
Gold medal – first place	1966 Bangkok	4×100 m freestyle
Gold medal – first place	1966 Bangkok	4×100 m medley
Summer Universiade
Bronze medal – third place	1967 Tokyo	100 m freestyle
Bronze medal – third place	1967 Tokyo	400 m freestyle

Michiko Kihara (木原 美知子, Kihara Michiko; April 5, 1948 – October 18, 2007) was a Japanese swimmer and TV actress. She competed at the 1964 Olympics in the 100 m backstroke, 4 × 100 m freestyle relay and 4 × 100 m medley relay and finished fourth in the medley relay. After retiring from swimming, Kihara became a model, businesswoman and TV actress, playing in several Japanese TV series in the 1970s–80s. In 2005, she was appointed as director of the Japan Swimming Federation. She died of subarachnoid hemorrhage at age 59.
