= Roosevelt Abdulgafur =

Filipino swimmer (born 1944)

Personal information
- Born: 13 July 1944 (age 81) Sulu, Philippines

Sport
- Sport: Swimming
Medal record
Men's swimming
Representing Philippines
Asian Games
Silver medal – second place	1966 Bangkok	4×200 m freestyle
Bronze medal – third place	1966 Bangkok	100 m freestyle
Bronze medal – third place	1966 Bangkok	200 m freestyle
Bronze medal – third place	1966 Bangkok	4×100 m medley

Roosevelt M. Abdulgafur (born 13 July 1944) is a Filipino former swimmer. He competed in five events at the 1968 Summer Olympics. In the Olympics he participated in six events.

== Early life and Asian Games ==
Abdulgafur was born in Sulu on July 13, 1944. He learned swimming at an early age. He participated at the 1966 Asian Games, gaining a bronze medal at the 100-meter and 200-meter freestyle.

== 1968 Olympics participation ==
He was 24 years old when he participated at the 1968 Summer Olympics. He competed in six swimming events. He competed in the Men's 100 metre freestyle, gaining 23rd place, with 55.8 seconds in the first round and 55.9 in the second. He competed in the Men's 200 metre freestyle, gaining 24th place with 2:04.08 time. He competed in the Men's 400 metre freestyle but did not start. He competed in the Men's 4 × 100 metre freestyle relay, where he and three others gained 14th place with 3:47.8 time. He competed in the Men's 4 x 200 metres Freestyle Relay, where he and three others gained 15th place with 8:41.0 time. His last event was the Men's 4 x 100 metres Medley Relay, where he and three others gained 16th place with 4:15.7 time.
