= List of Philippine Asian Games medalists =

The Philippines has produced 67 gold, 114 silver and 229 bronze medals in the Asian Games since 1951. The Asian Games is a multi-nation, multi sports event held every four years and is the most prestigious games in Asia next to the Olympics. This is a list of all Philippine Asian Games medalists, classified per sport. The next Asian Games will be in Japan from 19 September to 4 October 2026.

== Philippine Asian Games medalists (1951–2022) ==
=== Archery ===
Archery made its début at the Asian Games in Bangkok, Thailand, in 1978, and has stayed on the program ever since. Compound archery competitions were added in 2014.
Year introduced: 1978
First medal : 2014
Last medal: 2014

Medal	Name	Sport	Event	Year
Bronze	Paul Marton Dela Cruz	Archery	Men's individual compound	2014

=== Athletics ===
Athletics is one of the core sports of the Asian games. Athletics has produced 11 gold medals. Mona Sulaiman has the most gold medal with three.

Year introduced: 1951
First medal : 1951
Last medal: 2022

100 meters

Medal	Name	Sport	Event	Year
Silver	Genaro Cabrera	Athletics	Men's 100m	1954
Gold	Inocencia Solis	Athletics	Women's 100m	1958
Bronze	Isaac Gomez	Athletics	Men's 100m	1958
Bronze	Rogelio Onofre	Athletics	Men's 100m	1962
Gold	Mona Sulaiman	Athletics	Women's 100m	1962
Gold	Lydia de Vega	Athletics	Women's 100m	1982
Gold	Lydia de Vega	Athletics	Women's 100m	1986

200 meters

Medal	Name	Sport	Event	Year
Bronze	Inocencia Solis	Athletics	Women's 200m	1954
Bronze	Enrique Bautista	Athletics	Men's 200m	1958
Gold	Mona Sulaiman	Athletics	Women's 200m	1962
Silver	Amelita Alanes	Athletics	Women's 200m	1970
Silver	Lydia de Vega	Athletics	Women's 200m	1986

400 meters

Medal	Name	Sport	Event	Year
Silver	Pablo Somblingo	Athletics	Men's 400m	1958
Silver	Isidro del Prado	Athletics	Men's 400m	1986

800 meters

Medal	Name	Sport	Event	Year
Bronze	Isabel Cruz	Athletics	Women's 800m	1970

4 × 100 m Relay

Medal	Name	Sport	Event	Year
Bronze	Tito Almagro; Jovencio Ardina; Bernabe Lovina; Genaro Cabrera	Athletics	Men's 4 × 100 m Relay	1951
Bronze	Genaro Cabrera; Gaspar Azares; Eusebio Ensong; Pedro Subido	Athletics	Men's 4 × 100 m Relay	1954
Bronze	Inocencia Solis; Rogelia Ferrer; Manolita Cinco; Roberta Anore	Athletics	Women's 4 × 100 m Relay	1954
Gold	Remegio Vista; Isaac Gomez; Pedro Subido; Enrique Bautista	Athletics	Men's 4 × 100 m Relay	1958
Silver	Inocencia Solis; Rogelia Ferrer; Irene Penuela; Francisca Sanopal	Athletics	Women's 4 × 100 m Relay	1958
Gold	Remegio Vista; Isaac Gomez; Claro Pellosis; Rogelio Onofre	Athletics	Men's 4 × 100 m Relay	1962
Gold	Aida Molinos; Francisca Sanopal; Inocencia Solis; Mona Sulaiman	Athletics	Women's 4 × 100 m Relay	1962
Bronze	Rogelio Onofre; Remegio Vista; Arnulfo Valles; William Moderno	Athletics	Men's 4 × 100 m Relay	1966
Bronze	Amelita Saberon; Lucila Tolentino; Lorena Morcilla; Lydia Silva-Netto	Athletics	Women's 4 × 100 m Relay	1978

4 × 400 m Relay

Medal	Name	Sport	Event	Year
Bronze	Bienvenido Llaneta; Bernabe Lovina; Tomas Bennet; Genaro Cabrera	Athletics	Men's 4 × 400 m Relay	1951
Bronze	Pablo Somblingo; Cipriano Niera; Mauricio Paubaya; Ernesto Rodriguez	Athletics	Men's 4 × 400 m Relay	1954
Bronze	Romeo Gido; Honesto Larce; Leopoldo Arnillo; Isidro del Prado	Athletics	Men's 4 × 400 m Relay	1986

Discus Throw

Medal	Name	Sport	Event	Year
Bronze	Aurelio Amante	Athletics	Men's Discus Throw	1951
Bronze	Josephine de la Viña	Athletics	Women's Discus Throw	1962
Gold	Josephine de la Viña	Athletics	Women's Discus Throw	1966

High Jump

Medal	Name	Sport	Event	Year
Gold	Andres Franco	Athletics	Men's High Jump	1951
Bronze	Andres Franco	Athletics	Men's High Jump	1954
Silver	Lolita Lagrosas	Athletics	Women's High Jump	1958
Bronze	Ciriaco Baronda	Athletics	Men's High Jump	1962
Silver	Lolita Lagrosas	Athletics	Women's High Jump	1966
Bronze	Lolita Lagrosas	Athletics	Women's High Jump	1970

Hurdles

Medal	Name	Sport	Event	Year
Bronze	Jaime Pimental	Athletics	Men's 400m Hurdles	1954
Silver	Francisca Sanopal	Athletics	Women's 80m Hurdles	1958
Bronze	Manolita Cinco	Athletics	Women's 80m Hurdles	1958
Silver	Francisca Sanopal	Athletics	Women's 80m Hurdles	1962
Bronze	Elma Muros	Athletics	Women's 400m Hurdles	1990

Javelin Throw

Medal	Name	Sport	Event	Year
Bronze	Vivencia Subido	Athletics	Women's Javelin Throw	1954
Bronze	Marcelina Alonso	Athletics	Women's Javelin Throw	1966

Long Jump

Medal	Name	Sport	Event	Year
Gold	Visitacion Badana	Athletics	Women's Long Jump	1958
Bronze	Elma Muros	Athletics	Women's Long Jump	1994

Pentathlon

Medal	Name	Sport	Event	Year
Bronze	Lolita Lagrosas	Athletics	Women's Pentathlon	1966
Bronze	Lolita Lagrosas	Athletics	Women's Pentathlon	1970

Pole Vault

Medal	Name	Sport	Event	Year
Gold	EJ Obiena	Athletics	Men's Pole Vault	2022

Shot Put

Medal	Name	Sport	Event	Year
Bronze	Mona Sulaiman	Athletics	Women's Shot Put	1962

Steeplechase

Medal	Name	Sport	Event	Year
Bronze	Hector Begeo	Athletics	Men's 3000m Steeplechase	1982

=== Basketball ===
Basketball has produced four gold medals and Carlos Loyzaga was a member of the team in all four victories. The Basketball team won the gold medal from 1951 to 1962.

Year introduced: 1951
First medal : 1951
Last medal: 2022

Medal	Name	Sport	Event	Year
Gold	Francisco Calilan; Andres dela Cruz; Genaro Fernandez; Jose Gochango; Rafael Hechanova; Moro Lorenzo; Carlos Loyzaga; Antonio Martinez; Lauro Mumar; Ignacio Ramos; Meliton Santos; Mariano Tolentino; Coach: Dionisio Calvo	Basketball	Men's Team	1951
Gold	Bayani Amador; Florentino Bautista; Jose Ma. Cacho; Napoleon Flores; Antonio Genato; Rafael Hechanova; Eduardo Lim; Carlos Loyzaga; Ramon Manulat; Lauro Mumar; Francisco Rabat; Ignacio Ramos; Ponciano Saldaña; Mariano Tolentino	Basketball	Men's Team	1954
Gold	Emilio Achacoso; Kurt Bachmann; Carlos Badion; Loreto Carbonell; Francisco Lagarejos; Eduardo Lim; Carlos Loyzaga; Ramon Manulat; Leonardo Marquicias; Constancio Ortiz; Mariano Tolentino; Antonio Villamor; Martin Urra; Francis Wilson; Coach: Valentin Eduque	Basketball	Men's Team	1958
Gold	Engracio Arazas; Kurt Bachmann; Narciso Bernardo; Geronimo Cruz| Manuel Jocson; Alfonso Marquez; Carlos Loyzaga; Roel Nadurata; Eduardo Pacheco; Cristobal Ramas; Alberto Reynoso; Joselino Roa; Edgardo Roque; Coach: Enrique Crame	Basketball	Men's Team	1962
Bronze	Eric Altamirano; Allan Caidic; Glenn Capacio; Harmon Codiñera; Jerry Codiñera; Jojo Lastimosa; Samboy Lim; Ronnie Magsanoc; Alvin Patrimonio; Dindo Pumaren; Elmer Reyes; Jack Tanuan	Basketball	Men's Team	1986
Silver	Allan Caidic; Hector Calma; Rey Cuenco; Yves Dignadice; Ramon Fernandez; Dante Gonzalgo; Samboy Lim; Chito Loyzaga; Ronnie Magsanoc; Alvin Patrimonio; Benjie Paras; Zaldy Realubit; Coach: Robert Jaworski	Basketball	Men's Team	1990
Bronze	Johnny Abarrientos; Marlou Aquino; Allan Caidic; Kenneth Duremdes; Dennis Espino; E. J. Feihl; Jojo Lastimosa; Jun Limpot; Vergel Meneses; Alvin Patrimonio; Olsen Racela; Andy Seigle; Coach: Tim Cone	Basketball	Men's Team	1998
Gold	Chris Newsome; Kevin Alas; Scottie Thompson; Arvin Tolentino; Chris Ross; Marcio Lassiter; June Mar Fajardo; CJ Perez; Calvin Oftana; Japeth Aguilar; Justin Brownlee; Ange Kouame; Coach: Tim Cone	Basketball	Men's Team	2022

=== Bowling ===
Tenpin bowling was first included since 1978 except in 1982 and 1990. Bong Coo has contributed five out of the seven gold medals for bowling. She also holds the Philippine record for most gold medals won in the Asian Games.

Years played: 1978, 1986, 1994-2018
First medal : 1978
Last medal: 2010

Singles

Medal	Name	Sport	Event	Year
Gold	Bong Coo	Bowling	Women's Singles	1978
Silver	Rosario de Leon	Bowling	Women's Singles	1978
Silver	Rene Reyes	Bowling	Men's Singles	1986
Bronze	Virgilio Sablan	Bowling	Men's Singles	1998
Bronze	Liza Clutario	Bowling	Women's Singles	2002
Gold	Engelberto Rivera	Bowling	Men's Singles	2010
Bronze	Frederick Ong	Bowling	Men's Singles	2010

Doubles

Medal	Name	Sport	Event	Year
Bronze	Lita dela Rosa; Nellie Castillo	Bowling	Women's Doubles	1978
Silver	Delfin Garcia; Jorge Fernandez	Bowling	Men's Doubles	1986
Bronze	Bong Coo; Arianne Cerdeña	Bowling	Women's Doubles	1986
Gold	Paeng Nepomuceno; R. J. Bautista	Bowling	Men's Doubles	2002

Masters

Medal	Name	Sport	Event	Year
Gold	Bong Coo	Bowling	Women's Masters	1978
Silver	Rosario de Leon	Bowling	Women's Masters	1978
Bronze	Catalina Solis	Bowling	Women's Masters	1986
Bronze	Irene Garcia	Bowling	Women's Masters	1994

Teams

Medal	Name	Sport	Event	Year
Gold	Bong Coo; Lita dela Rosa; Rosario de Leon; Lolita Reformado; Nellie Castillo	Bowling	Women's Team	1978
Gold	Bong Coo; Catalina Solis; Rebecca Watanabe; Arianne Cerdeña; Cecilia Gaffud	Bowling	Women's Team	1986
Silver	Jorge Fernandez; Paeng Nepomuceno; Rene Reyes; Paulo Valdez; Angelo Constantino	Bowling	Men's Team	1994
Silver	Liza del Rosario; Irene Garcia; Liza Clutario; Josephine Canare; Cecilia Yap; Kathleen Ann Lopez	Bowling	Women's Team	2002

Trios

Medal	Name	Sport	Event	Year
Silver	Lita dela Rosa; Lolita Reformado; Bong Coo	Bowling	Women's Trios	1978
Bronze	Tito Sotto; Manny Sugatan; Jose Santos	Bowling	Men's Trios	1978
Silver	Christian Jan Suarez; Chester King; Leonardo Rey	Bowling	Men's Trios	2002

All-Events

Medal	Name	Sport	Event	Year
Gold	Bong Coo	Bowling	Women's All-Events	1986

=== Boxing ===
Since 1954, boxing has been part of the Asian Games and the Philippines has produced 15 gold medals, 8 of those came from Flyweight and Bantamweight Divisions who got 4 gold medals each and the only sport that has medaled since then. Featherweight and Middleweight Divisions are yet to get a gold medal. In 2010, a women's category was added and Annie Albania is the first ever recipient and the only women boxer to earn a medal up to this day.

Year introduced: 1954
First medal : 1954
Last medal: 2022

Light Flyweight

Medal	Name	Sport	Event	Year
Bronze	Rodolfo Diaz	Boxing	Men's Light Flyweight 48kg	1966
Silver	Manolo Vicera	Boxing	Men's Light Flyweight 48kg	1970
Silver	Efren Tabanas	Boxing	Men's Light Flyweight 48kg	1982
Bronze	Elias Recaido	Boxing	Men's Light Flyweight 48kg	1990
Gold	Mansueto Velasco	Boxing	Men's Light Flyweight 48kg	1994
Silver	Harry Tañamor	Boxing	Men's Light Flyweight 48kg	2002
Bronze	Godfrey Castro	Boxing	Men's Light Flyweight 48kg	2006
Bronze	Victorio Saludar	Boxing	Men's Light Flyweight 49kg	2010
Bronze	Mark Anthony Barriga	Boxing	Men's Light Flyweight 49kg	2014
Bronze	Carlo Paalam	Boxing	Men's Light Flyweight 49kg	2018

Flyweight

Medal	Name	Sport	Event	Year
Gold	Ernesto Sajo	Boxing	Men's Flyweight 51kg	1954
Gold	Elias Recaido	Boxing	Men's Flyweight 51kg	1994
Gold	Violito Payla	Boxing	Men's Flyweight 51kg	2006
Gold	Rey Saludar	Boxing	Men's Flyweight 52kg	2010
Silver	Annie Albania	Boxing	Women's Flyweight 51kg	2010
Silver	Rogen Ladon	Boxing	Men's Flyweight 52kg	2018

Bantamweight

Medal	Name	Sport	Event	Year
Gold	Alejandro Ortuoste	Boxing	Men's Bantamweight 54kg	1954
Bronze	Jacinto Diaz	Boxing	Men's Bantamweight 54kg	1958
Bronze	Jose Ramirez	Boxing	Men's Bantamweight 54kg	1962
Gold	Ricardo Fortaleza	Boxing	Men's Bantamweight 54kg	1970
Bronze	Brix Flores	Boxing	Men's Bantamweight 54kg	1986
Gold	Roberto Jalnaiz	Boxing	Men's Bantamweight 54kg	1990
Bronze	Anthony Igusquisa	Boxing	Men's Bantamweight 54kg	1994
Gold	Joan Tipon	Boxing	Men's Bantamweight 54kg	2006
Bronze	Mario Fernandez	Boxing	Men's Bantamweight 56kg	2014

Featherweight

Medal	Name	Sport	Event	Year
Silver	Mauro Dizon	Boxing	Men's Featherweight 57kg	1954
Silver	Dionisio Guevarra	Boxing	Men's Featherweight 57kg	1958
Bronze	Egino Grafia	Boxing	Men's Featherweight 57kg	1962
Bronze	Nemesio Gonzaga	Boxing	Men's Featherweight 57kg	1970
Bronze	Willie Lucas	Boxing	Men's Featherweight 57kg	1974
Bronze	Eric Canoy	Boxing	Men's Featherweight 57kg	1994
Bronze	Eric Canoy	Boxing	Men's Featherweight 57kg	1998

Lightweight

Medal	Name	Sport	Event	Year
Gold	Celedonio Espinosa	Boxing	Men's Lightweight 60kg	1 954
Bronze	Celedonio Espinosa	Boxing	Men's Lightweight 60kg	1958
Bronze	Catalino Arpon	Boxing	Men's Lightweight 60kg	1962
Gold	Rodolfo Arpon	Boxing	Men's Lightweight 60kg	1966
Silver	Ruben Mares	Boxing	Men's Lightweight 60kg	1978
Bronze	Fernando de Asis	Boxing	Men's Lightweight 60kg	1982
Silver	Leopoldo Cantancio	Boxing	Men's Lightweight 60kg	1986
Bronze	Leopoldo Cantancio	Boxing	Men's Lightweight 60kg	1990
Bronze	Genebert Basadre	Boxing	Men's Lightweight 60kg	2006
Silver	Charly Suarez	Boxing	Men's Lightweight 60kg	2014

Light Welterweight

Medal	Name	Sport	Event	Year
Gold	Ernesto Porto	Boxing	Men's Light Welterweight 63.5kg	1954
Bronze	Eugenio Valmocina	Boxing	Men's Light Welterweight 63.5kg	1970
Bronze	Arlo Chavez	Boxing	Men's Light Welterweight 63.5kg	1990
Gold	Reynaldo Galido	Boxing	Men's Light Welterweight 63.5kg	1994

Welterweight

Medal	Name	Sport	Event	Year
Gold	Manfredo Alipala	Boxing	Men's Welterweight 67kg	1962
Bronze	Raymundo Suico	Boxing	Men's Welterweight 67kg	1982

Light Middleweight

Medal	Name	Sport	Event	Year
Gold	Vicente Tuñacao	Boxing	Men's Light Middleweight 71kg	1954
Bronze	Felix Ocampo	Boxing	Men's Light Middleweight 71kg	1966
Bronze	Nicolas Aquilino	Boxing	Men's Light Middleweight 71kg	1970
Bronze	Nicolas Aquilino	Boxing	Men's Light Middleweight 71kg	1974
Bronze	Ernesto Coronel	Boxing	Men's Light Middleweight 71kg	1986

Middleweight

Medal	Name	Sport	Event	Year
Bronze	Bernardo Belleza	Boxing	Men's Middleweight 75kg	1966
Bronze	Wilfredo Lopez	Boxing	Men's Middleweight 75kg	2014
Bronze	Eumir Marcial	Boxing	Men's Middleweight 75kg	2018

Light Heavyweight

Medal	Name	Sport	Event	Year
Silver	Eumir Marcial	Boxing	Men's Light Heavyweight 80kg	2022

=== Chess ===
Chess was included in the Asian Games schedule in both the 2006 edition in Doha and the 2010 event in Guangzhou. In 2022, it will be back in the AG.
Years played: 2006, 2010, 2022
First medal :2010
Last medal: 2010

Teams

Medal	Name	Sport	Event	Year
Silver	Wesley So; Eugene Torre; Darwin Laylo; John Paul Gomez; Rogelio Antonio Jr.	Chess	Men's Team Standard	2010

=== Cue Sports ===
Cue sports were included in the Games for four consecutive editions from 1998 to 2010, after which they were removed. It will reappear in the Doha edition in 2030. The Philippines has produced a total four gold medals from 1998 to 2010.

Year played: 1998 to 2010, 2030
First medal : 1998
Last medal: 2010

Singles

Medal	Name	Sport	Event	Year
Silver	Warren Kiamco	Cue sports	Men's 9-Ball Singles	2002
Bronze	Efren Reyes	Cue sports	Men's 8-Ball Singles	2002
Gold	Antonio Gabica	Cue sports	Men's 9-Ball Singles	2006
Silver	Antonio Gabica	Cue sports	Men's 8-Ball Singles	2006
Silver	Jeff de Luna	Cue sports	Men's 9-Ball Singles	2006
Gold	Dennis Orcollo	Cue Sports	Men's 9-Ball Singles	2010
Silver	Warren Kiamco	Cue Sports	Men's 9-Ball Singles	2010

Doubles

Medal	Name	Sport	Event	Year
Gold	Gandy Valle; Romeo Villanueva	Cue sports	Men's 9-Ball Doubles	1998
Gold	Francisco Bustamante; Antonio Lining	Cue sports	Men's 9-Ball Doubles	2002

=== Cycling ===
Cycling debuted at the 1951 Asian Games and has been a part of the program ever since with the exception of 1954. The Asian Games feature four cycling disciplines: track (since 1951), road (since 1951), mountain bike (since 1998) and BMX (since 2010). In 1986, Cycling opened its door to Women's and first introduce in the Road Race event.

Year introduced: 1951
First medal : 1966
Last medal: 2022

BMX Event

Medal	Name	Sport	Event	Year
Gold	Daniel Caluag	Cycling	Men's BMX Race	2014
Bronze	Daniel Caluag	Cycling	Men's BMX race	2018
Bronze	Patrick Coo	Cycling	Men's BMX race	2022

Road Event

Medal	Name	Sport	Event	Year
Bronze	Victor Espiritu	Cycling	Men's Road Race	1998

Track Event

Medal	Name	Sport	Event	Year
Silver	Claudio Romeo	Cycling	Track 1600m Mass Start	1966
Bronze	Claudio Romeo	Cycling	Track 10000m Mass Start	1966
Silver	Rolando Guaves	Cycling	Track 4800m Mass Start	1970
Bronze	Rolando Guaves	Cycling	Track 800m Mass Start	1970
Bronze	Roberto Querimit	Cycling	Track 1600m Mass Start	1970
Bronze	Rodolfo Guaves	Cycling	Track 1km time Trial	1982
Bronze	Edgardo Pagarigan	Cycling	Track Men's Points Race	1982
Bronze	Deogracias Asuncion; Jomel Lorenzo; Renato Mier; Diomedes Panton	Cycling	Track Team Pursuit	1982
Bronze	Bernardo Rimarim	Cycling	Track Men's Points Race	1986

=== Dancesport ===
DanceSport is a team sport. It becomes an official Asian Games sport in Guangzhou Asian Games, 2010.

Year introduced: 2010
First medal : 2010
Last medal: 2010

Latin

Medal	Name	Sport	Event	Year
Bronze	Ronnie Steeve Vergara; Charlea Lagaras	Dancesport	Latin - Paso Doble	2010
Bronze	Ronnie Steeve Vergara; Charlea Lagaras	Dancesport	Latin - Cha-Cha-Cha	2010

=== Diving ===
Diving is a part of the Asian Games since 1951.

Year introduced: 1951
First medal : 1966
Last medal: 1966

Medal	Name	Sport	Event	Year
Bronze	Connie Paredes	Diving	Women's 3m Springboard	1966

=== Equestrian ===
Since 1982, equestrian sports have been included in the Asian Games. Mikee Cojuangco-Jaworski produced the lone gold for Equestrian.

Year introduced: 1982
First medal : 1982
Last medal: 2002

Individual Jumping

Medal	Name	Sport	Event	Year
Gold	Mikee Cojuangco-Jaworski	Equestrian	Individual Jumping	2002

Team Eventing

Medal	Name	Sport	Event	Year
Bronze	Steven Virata; Marielle Virata; Fidelino Barba; Jose Montilla	Equestrian	Team Eventing	1982

Team Jumping

Medal	Name	Sport	Event	Year
Silver	Danielle Cojuangco; Mikee Cojuangco-Jaworski; Toni Leviste; Michelle Barrera	Equestrian	Team Jumping	2002

=== Golf ===
The Philippines won four gold medals from 1986 to 2018. Yuka Saso led, with two gold medals in 2018.

Year introduced:
First medal : 1986
Last medal: 2018

Individual Event

Medal	Name	Sport	Event	Year
Gold	Ramon Brobio	Golf	Men's Individual	1986
Bronze	Ramon Brobio	Golf	Men's Individual	1990
Bronze	Jamille Jose	Golf	Women's Individual	1990
Silver	Gerald Rosales	Golf	Men's Individual	1998
Bronze	Michael Bibat	Golf	Men's Individual	2006
Silver	Miguel Luis Tabuena	Golf	Men's Individual	2010
Gold	Yuka Saso	Golf	Women's Individual	2018
Bronze	Bianca Pagdanganan	Golf	Women's Individual	2018

Team Event

Medal	Name	Sport	Event	Year
Bronze	Ramon Brobio; Robert Pactolerin; Wilfredo Victoria; Carito Villaroman	Golf	Men's Team	1986
Silver	Ramon Brobio; Felix Casas; Vince Lauron; Danilo Zarate	Golf	Men's Team	1990
Bronze	Ruby Chico; Yvtte de Leon; Mary Grace Estuesta; Jamille Jose	Golf	Women's Team	1990
Bronze	Dorothy Delasin; Ria Quiazon; Jennifer Rosales	Golf	Women's Team	1998
Silver	Cookie La'O; Rhey Luna; Angelo Que; Gerald Rosales	Golf	Men's Team	1998
Bronze	Heidi Chua; Ria Quiazon; Carmelette Villaroman	Golf	Women's Team	2002
Gold	Yuka Saso; Bianca Pagdanganan; Lois Kaye Go	Golf	Women's Team	2018

=== Judo ===
Year introduced: 1986
First medal : 2018
Last medal: 2018

Medal	Name	Sport	Event	Year
Silver	Kiyomi Watanabe	Judo	Women's 63kg	2018

=== Ju-jitsu ===
Year introduced: 2018
First medal : 2018
Last medal: 2022

Medal	Name	Sport	Event	Year
Bronze	Meggie Ochoa	Ju-jitsu	Women's Ne-waza -49kg	2018
Gold	Meggie Ochoa	Ju-jitsu	Women's Ne-waza -48 kg	2022
Gold	Annie Ramirez	Ju-jitsu	Women's Ne-waza -57 kg	2022
Bronze	Kaila Napolis	Ju-jitsu	Women's Ne-waza -52 kg	2022

=== Karate ===
Year introduced: 1994
First medal : 1994
Last medal: 2022

Kata Event

Medal	Name	Sport	Event	Year
Bronze	Richard Lim	Karate	Men's Kata	1994
Bronze	Cherli Tugday	Karate	Women's Kata	2002
Bronze	Noel Espinosa	Karate	Men's Kata	2006
Bronze	Sakura Alforte	Karate	Women's Kata	2022

Kumite Event

Medal	Name	Sport	Event	Year
Bronze	David Lay	Karate	Men's Kumite -65kg	1994
Bronze	Gretchen Malalad	Karate	Women's Kumite -60kg	2002
Silver	Marne Pabillore	Karate	Women's Kumite -53kg	2006
Bronze	Mae Soriano	Karate	Women's Kumite -55kg	2014
Bronze	Junna Tsukii	Karate	Women's Kumite 50kg	2018

=== Pencak silat ===
Year introduced: 2018
First medal : 2018
Last medal: 2018

Tunggal Event

Medal	Name	Sport	Event	Year
Bronze	Cherry May Regalado	Pencak Silat	Women's Tunggal	2018
Bronze	Almohaidib Abad	Pencak Silat	Men's Tunggal	2018

Tanding Event

Medal	Name	Sport	Event	Year
Bronze	Jefferson Rhey Loon	Pencak Silat	Men's Class D 60-65kg	2018
Bronze	Dines Dumaan	Pencak Silat	Men's Class B 50-55kg	2018

=== Rowing ===
Year introduced: 1982
First medal : 2002
Last medal: 2002

Double Sculls

Medal	Name	Sport	Event	Year
Bronze	Alvin Amposta; Nestor Cordova	Rowing	Men's Lightweight Double Sculls	2002

=== Roller Sports ===
Year introduced: 2010
First medal : 2018
Last medal: 2018

Skateboarding

Medal	Name	Sport	Event	Year
Gold	Margielyn Didal	Roller sports	Women's Street Skateboarding	2018

=== Sailing ===
Year introduced: 1970
First medal : 1982
Last medal: 1982

Medal	Name	Sport	Event	Year
Silver	Policarpio Ortega	Sailing	Windglider	1982

=== Sepak takraw ===
Year introduced: 1990
First medal : 2022
Last medal: 2022

Quadrant

Medal	Name	Sport	Event	Year
Bronze	Ronsited Gabayeron; Mark Joseph Gonzales; Jason Huerte; Rheyjey Ortouste; Jom Lerry Rafael; Vince Alyson Torno	Sepak takraw	Men's Quadrant	2022

Regu

Medal	Name	Sport	Event	Year
Bronze	Ronsited Gabayeron; Mark Joseph Gonzales; Jason Huerte; Rheyjey Ortouste; Jom Lerry Rafael	Sepak takraw	Men's Regu	2022

=== Shooting ===
Shooting produced five gold medals. The most successful athlete was Adolfo Feliciano in 1954 with two gold medals.

Year introduced: 1954
First medal : 1954
Last medal: 2002

Air Rifle

Medal	Name	Sport	Event	Year
Bronze	Leopoldo Ang; Roberto del Castillo; Adolfo Feliciano; Lodovico Espinosa	Shooting	Men's 10m Air Rifle Team	1966

Center Fire Pistol

Medal	Name	Sport	Event	Year
Silver	Edgar Bond	Shooting	Men's 25m Center Fire Pistol	1966
Bronze	Antonio Arguelles; Edgar Bond; Moises Gines; Horacio Miranda	Shooting	Men's 25m Center Fire Pistol Team	1966

Pistol

Medal	Name	Sport	Event	Year
Silver	Albert von Einsiedel	Shooting	50m Pistol	1954
Bronze	Simeon Lee	Shooting	50m Pistol	1954

Rapid Fire Pistol

Medal	Name	Sport	Event	Year
Gold	Martin Gison	Shooting	25m Rapid Fire Pistol	1954
Silver	Martin Gison	Shooting	25m Rapid Fire Pistol	1958
Bronze	Paterno Miranda	Shooting	50m Rapid Fire Pistol	1966
Silver	Nestor de Castro; Horacio Miranda; Paterno Miranda; Raymundo Quitoriano	Shooting	Men's 30m Rapid Fire Pistol Team	1966

Rifle Prone

Medal	Name	Sport	Event	Year
Gold	Albert von Einsiedel	Shooting	50m Rifle Prone	1954
Silver	Cesar Jayme	Shooting	50m Rifle Prone	1954
Bronze	Martin Gison	Shooting	50m Rifle Prone	1954
Silver	Cesar Jayme	Shooting	50m Rifle Prone	1958
Bronze	Adolfo Feliciano	Shooting	50m Rifle Prone	1966
Bronze	Jose Medina	Shooting	50m Rifle Prone	1982

Rifle 3 Positions

Medal	Name	Sport	Event	Year
Gold	Adolfo Feliciano	Shooting	50m Rifle 3 Positions	1954
Gold	Hernando Castelo	Shooting	300m Rifle 3 Positions	1954
Silver	Martin Gison	Shooting	50m Rifle 3 Positions	1954
Silver	Martin Gison	Shooting	300m Rifle 3 Positions	1954
Bronze	Jose Zalvidea	Shooting	50m Rifle 3 Positions	1954
Bronze	Adolfo Feliciano	Shooting	50m Rifle 3 Positions	1958
Gold	Adolfo Feliciano	Shooting	300m Rifle 3 Positions	1958
Silver	Adolfo Feliciano	Shooting	50m Rifle 3 Positions	1962
Bronze	Adolfo Feliciano	Shooting	50m Rifle 3 Positions	1966
Silver	Leopoldo Ang; Roberto del Castillo; Adolfo Feliciano; Bernardo San Juan	Shooting	Men's 50m Rifle 3 Positions Team	1966

Standard Rifle 3 Positions

Medal	Name	Sport	Event	Year
Silver	Adolfo Feliciano	Shooting	50m Standard Rifle 3 Positions	1966
Silver	Leopoldo Ang; Roberto del Castillo; Adolfo Feliciano; Lodovico Espinosa	Shooting	Men's 50m Standard Rifle 3 Positions Team	1966

Trap

Medal	Name	Sport	Event	Year
Bronze	Enrique Beech	Shooting	Men's Trap	1954
Bronze	Enrique Beech	Shooting	Men's Trap	1958
Bronze	George Earnshaw	Shooting	Men's Trap	1974
Bronze	Jethro Dionisio	Shooting	Men's Trap	2002
Bronze	Eric Ang; Jethro Dionisio; Jaime Recio	Shooting	Men's Trap Team	2002

=== Swimming ===
Swimming has produced ten gold medals from 1951 - 1988. Haydee Coloso-Espino has the most gold medals with three. She also holds the Philippine record for most medals won in the Asian Games.

Year introduced: 1951
First medal : 1951
Last medal: 1998

3x100m Medley Relay

Medal	Name	Sport	Event	Year
Gold	Artemio Salamat; Jacinto Cayco; Nurhatab Rajab	Swimming	Men's 3x100m Medley Relay	1951

100m Backstroke

Medal	Name	Sport	Event	Year
Gold	Artemio Salamat	Swimming	Men's 100m Backstroke	1951
Bronze	Edilberto Bonus	Swimming	Men's 100m Backstroke	1951
Gold	Jocelyn von Giese	Swimming	Women's 100m Backstroke	1954
Bronze	Rodolfo Agustin	Swimming	Men's 100m Backstroke	1958
Bronze	Sylvia von Giese	Swimming	Women's 100m Backstroke	1958
Bronze	Sampang Hassan	Swimming	Men's 100m Backstroke	1962
Silver	Gerardo Rosario	Swimming	Men's 100m Backstroke	1974
Bronze	Raymond Papa	Swimming	Men's 100m Backstroke	1998

200m Backstroke

Medal	Name	Sport	Event	Year
Gold	Jacinto Cayco	Swimming	Men's 200m Backstroke	1951
Silver	Rene Amabuyok	Swimming	Men's 200m Backstroke	1951
Bronze	Lorenzo Cortez	Swimming	Men's 200m Backstroke	1958
Silver	Gerardo Rosario	Swimming	Men's 200m Backstroke	1974
Bronze	Raymond Papa	Swimming	Men's 200m Backstroke	1998

100m Breaststroke

Medal	Name	Sport	Event	Year
Bronze	Amman Jalmaani	Swimming	Men's 100m Breaststroke	1966
Silver	Amman Jalmaani	Swimming	Men's 100m Breaststroke	1970
Bronze	Nancy Deano	Swimming	Women's 100m Breaststroke	1974

200m Breaststroke

Medal	Name	Sport	Event	Year
Bronze	Victoria Cagayat	Swimming	Women's 200m Breaststroke	1958
Bronze	Rolando Landrito	Swimming	Men's 200m Breaststroke	1962
Silver	Amman Jalmaani	Swimming	Men's 200m Breaststroke	1970
Bronze	Kemalpasa Umih	Swimming	Men's 200m Breaststroke	1970
Bronze	Nancy Deano	Swimming	Women's 200m Breaststroke	1974

100m Freestyle

Medal	Name	Sport	Event	Year
Bronze	Sotero Alcantara	Swimming	Men's 100m Freestyle	1951
Gold	Haydee Coloso	Swimming	Women's 100m Freestyle	1954
Silver	Haydee Coloso-Espino	Swimming	Women's 100m Freestyle	1958
Bronze	Haydee Coloso-Espino	Swimming	Women's 100m Freestyle	1962
Silver	Helen Elliott	Swimming	Women's 100m Freestyle	1966
Bronze	Roosevelt Abdulgafur	Swimming	Men's 100m Freestyle	1966
Bronze	Gerardo Rosario	Swimming	Men's 100m Freestyle	1978

200m Freestyle

Medal	Name	Sport	Event	Year
Silver	Haydee Coloso-Espino	Swimming	Women's 200m Fresstyle	1958
Bronze	Corazon Lozada	Swimming	Women's 200m Freestyle	1962
Silver	Helen Elliott	Swimming	Women's 200m Freestyle	1966
Bronze	Roosevelt Abdulgafur	Swimming	Men's 200m Freestyle	1966
Bronze	Jairulla Jaitulla	Swimming	Men's 200m Freestyle	1970
Gold	Billy Wilson	Swimming	Men's 200m Freestyle	1982
Gold	Gerardo Rosario	Swimming	Men's 200m Freestyle	1978

400m Freestyle

Medal	Name	Sport	Event	Year
Silver	Mohammed Mala	Swimming	Men's 400m Freestyle	1951
Bronze	Bana Sailani	Swimming	Men's 400m Freestyle	1954
Silver	Gertrudes Lozada	Swimming	Women's 400m Freestyle	1958
Bronze	Bana Sailani	Swimming	Men's 400m Freestyle	1958
Bronze	Corazon Lozada	Swimming	Women's 400m Freestyle	1962
Silver	Helen Elliott	Swimming	Women's 400m Freestyle	1966
Bronze	Tony Asamli	Swimming	Men's 400m Freestyle	1966
Silver	Billy Wilson	Swimming	Men's 400m Freestyle	1982

800m Freestyle

Medal	Name	Sport	Event	Year
Silver	Serafin Villanueva	Swimming	Men's 800m Freestyle	1951
Bronze	Mohammed Mala	Swimming	Men's 800m Freestyle	1951

1500m Freestyle

Medal	Name	Sport	Event	Year
Silver	Mohammed Mala	Swimming	Men's 1500m Freestyle	1951
Bronze	Serafin Villanueva	Swimming	Men's 1500m Freestyle	1951
Bronze	Bana Sailani	Swimming	Men's 1500m Freestyle	1958
Bronze	Tony Asamli	Swimming	Men's 1500m Freestyle	1966
Bronze	Edwin Borja	Swimming	Men's 1500m Freestyle	1974
Bronze	Billy Wilson	Swimming	Men's 1500m Freestyle	1982
Bronze	Mark Joseph	Swimming	Men's 1500m Freestyle	1978

4 × 100 m Freestyle Relay

Medal	Name	Sport	Event	Year
Silver	Sotero Alcantara; Serafin Villanueva; Mohammed Mala; Nurhatab Rajab	Swimming	Men's 4 × 100 m Freestyle Relay	1951
Silver	Sonia von Giese; Gertrudes Vito; Nimfa Lim; Haydee Coloso	Swimming	Women's 4 × 100 m Freestyle Relay	1954
Silver	Victoria Cullen; Corazon Lozada; Gertrudes Lozada; Haydee Coloso-Espino	Swimming	Women's 4 × 100 m Freestyle Relay	1958
Silver	Connie Paredes; Corazon Lozada; Gertrudes Lozada; Haydee Coloso-Espino	Swimming	Women's 4 × 100 m Freestyle Relay	1962
Silver	Helen Elliott; Tessie Lozada; Gertrudes Lozada; Corazon Lozada	Swimming	Women's 4 × 100 m Freestyle Relay	1966
Silver	Dae Imlani; Carlos Brosas; Kemalpasa Umih; Jairulla Jaitulla	Swimming	Men's 4 × 100 m Freestyle Relay	1970
Bronze	Dae Imlani; Edwin Borja; Gerardo Rosario; Sukarno Maut	Swimming	Men's 4 × 100 m Freestyle Relay	1974

4 × 100 m Medley Relay

Medal	Name	Sport	Event	Year
Gold	Jocelyn von Giese; Victoria Cagayat; Sandra von Giese; Haydee Coloso-Espino	Swimming	Women's 4 × 100 m Medley Relay	1958
Silver	Rodolfo Agustin; Jacinto Cayco; Freddie Elizalde; Dakula Arabani	Swimming	Men's 4 × 100 m Medley Relay	1958
Silver	Sampang Hassan; Antonio Saloso; Amir Hussin Hamsain; Roosevelt Abdulgafur	Swimming	Men's 4 × 100 m Medley Relay	1962
Bronze	Tessie Lozada; Dolores Agustin; Gertrudes Lozada; Haydee Coloso-Espino	Swimming	Women's 4 × 100 m Medley Relay	1962
Silver	Rosalina Abreu; Hedy Garcia; Gertrudes Lozada; Helen Elliott	Swimming	Women's 4 × 100 m Medley Relay	1966
Bronze	Eduardo Abreu; Amman Jalmaani; Leroy Goff; Roosevelt Abdulgafur	Swimming	Men's 4 × 100 m Medley Relay	1966
Silver	Ibnorajik Muksan; Amman Jalmaani; Leroy Goff; Jairulla Jaitulla	Swimming	Men's 4 × 100 m Medley Relay	1970
Bronze	Luz Arzaga; Hedy Garcia; Susan Papa; Luz Laciste	Swimming	Women's 4 × 100 m Medley Relay	1970
Bronze	Grace Justimbaste; Nancy Deano; Susan Papa; Betina Abdula	Swimming	Women's 4 × 100 m Medley Relay	1974
Bronze	Jairulla Jaitulla; Mazier Mukaram; Gerardo Rosario; Amman Jalmaani	Swimming	Men's 4 × 100 m Medley Relay	1974

4 × 200 m Freestyle Relay

Medal	Name	Sport	Event	Year
Bronze	Rolando Santos; Bertulfo Cachero; Angel Colmenares; Bana Sailan	Swimming	Men's 4 × 200 m Freestyle Relay	1954
Silver	Agapito Lozada; Ulpiano Babol; Bana Sailani; Dakula Arabani	Swimming	Men's 4 × 200 m Freestyle Relay	1958
Bronze	Roosevelt Abdulgafur; Bana Sailani; Haylil Said; Victorino Marcelino	Swimming	Men's 4 × 200 m Freestyle Relay	1962
Silver	Leroy Goff; Haylil Said; Tony Asamli; Roosevelt Abdulgafur	Swimming	Men's 4 × 200 m Freestyle Relay	1966
Silver	Dae Imlani; Leroy Goff; Kemalpasa Umih; Jairulla Jaitulla	Swimming	Men's 4 × 200 m Freestyle Relay	1970
Bronze	Kemalpasa Umih; Dae Imlani; Gerardo Rosario; Sukarno Maut	Swimming	Men's 4 × 200 m Freestyle Relay	1974
Bronze	Vicente Cheng; Mark Joseph; Jairulla Jaitulla; Gerardo Rosario	Swimming	Men's 4 × 200 m Freestyle Relay	1978

100m Butterfly

Medal	Name	Sport	Event	Year
Gold	Haydee Coloso	Swimming	Women's 100m Butterfly	1954
Silver	Norma Yldefonso	Swimming	Women's 100m Butterfly	1954
Bronze	Sandra von Giese	Swimming	Women's 100m Butterfly	1954
Silver	Sandra von Giese	Swimming	Women's 100m Butterfly	1958
Bronze	Walter Brown	Swimming	Men's 100m Butterfly	1958
Bronze	Amir Hussin Hamsain	Swimming	Men's 100m Butterfly	1962
Bronze	Gertrudes Lozada	Swimming	Women's 100m Butterfly	1962
Bronze	Gertrudes Lozada	Swimming	Women's 100m Butterfly	1966

200m Butterfly

Medal	Name	Sport	Event	Year
Gold	Parsons Nabiula	Swimming	Men's 200m Butterfly	1954
Silver	Amado Jimenez	Swimming	Men's 200m Butterfly	1954
Bronze	Robert Collins	Swimming	Men's 200m Butterfly	1954
Bronze	Freddie Elizalde	Swimming	Men's 200m Butterfly	1958
Bronze	Amir Hussin Hamsain	Swimming	Men's 200m Butterfly	1962
Bronze	Leroy Goff	Swimming	Men's 200m Butterfly	1966
Bronze	Leroy Goff	Swimming	Men's 200m Butterfly	1970

200m Individual Medley

Medal	Name	Sport	Event	Year
Bronze	Jairulla Jaitulla	Swimming	Men's 200m Individual Medley	1974
Bronze	Nancy Deano	Swimming	Women's 200m Individual Medley	1974

400m Individual Medley

Medal	Name	Sport	Event	Year
Bronze	Tony Asamli	Swimming	Men's 400m Individual Medley	1966

=== Taekwondo ===
Year introduced: 1986
First medal : 1986
Last medal: 2022

Bantamweight

Medal	Name	Sport	Event	Year
Silver	Tshomlee Go	Taekwondo	Men's Bantamweight -62kg	2006
Bronze	Tshomlee Go	Taekwondo	Men's Bantamweight -63kg	2010

Featherweight

Medal	Name	Sport	Event	Year
Silver	Robert Vargas	Taekwondo	Men's Featherweight -64kg	1994
Silver	Donald Geisler	Taekwondo	Men's Featherweight -64kg	1998
Bronze	Manuel Rivero	Taekwondo	Men's Featherweight -67kg	2006
Bronze	Benjamin Keith Sembrano	Taekwondo	Men's Featherweight -68kg	2014
Bronze	Pauline Louise Lopez	Taekwondo	Women's Kyorugi Featherweight -57kg	2018

Finweight

Medal	Name	Sport	Event	Year
Bronze	Eunice Alora	Taekwondo	Women's Finweight -47kg	2006
Bronze	John Paul Lizardo	Taekwondo	Men's Finweight -54kg	2010
Bronze	Mary Anjelay Pelaez	Taekwondo	Women's Finweight -46kg	2014

Flyweight

Medal	Name	Sport	Event	Year
Bronze	Rodolfo Abratique	Taekwondo	Men's Flyweight -54kg	1998
Bronze	Tshomlee Go	Taekwondo	Men's Flyweight -58kg	2002
Bronze	Daleen Cordero	Taekwondo	Women's Flyweight -51kg	2002
Bronze	Paul Romero	Taekwondo	Men's Flyweight -58kg	2010
Bronze	Levita Ronna Ilao	Taekwondo	Women's Flyweight -49kg	2014

Heavyweight

Medal	Name	Sport	Event	Year
Bronze	Margarita Bonifacio	Taekwondo	Women's Heavyweight +70kg	1998

Lightweight

Medal	Name	Sport	Event	Year
Bronze	Monsour del Rosario	Taekwondo	Men's Lightweight -70kg	1986
Bronze	Nelia Sy	Taekwondo	Women's Lightweight -60kg	1998
Bronze	Veronica Domingo	Taekwondo	Women's Lightweight -63kg	2006
Bronze	Samuel Morrison	Taekwondo	Men's Lightweight -74kg	2014

Middleweight

Medal	Name	Sport	Event	Year
Bronze	Dindo Simpao	Taekwondo	Men's Middleweight -84kg	2002
Bronze	Sally Solis	Taekwondo	Women's Middleweight -72kg	2002
Bronze	Kirstie Elaine Alora	Taekwondo	Women's Middleweight -73kg	2010
Bronze	Kirstie Elaine Alora	Taekwondo	Women's Middleweight -73kg	2014

Welterweight

Medal	Name	Sport	Event	Year
Bronze	Veronica Domingo	Taekwondo	Women's Welterweight -67kg	2002
Silver	Toni Rivero	Taekwondo	Women's Welterweight -67kg	2006

Poomsae

Medal	Name	Sport	Event	Year
Bronze	Janna Oliva; Juvenile Crisostomo; Rinna Babanto	Taekwondo	Women's Team Poomsae	2018
Bronze	Dustin Mella; Jeordan Dominguez; Rodolfo Reyes Jr.	Taekwondo	Men's Team Poomsae	2018
Bronze	Patrick King Perez	Taekwondo	Men's Individual Poomsae	2022

=== Tennis ===
Tennis has contributed three gold medals from 1958 to 1961. Raymundo Deyro is the most successful player with two gold medals in 1958.

Year introduced: 1958
First medal : 1958
Last medal: 2022

Singles

Medal	Name	Sport	Event	Year
Gold	Raymundo Deyro	Tennis	Men's Singles	1958
Silver	Felicisimo Ampon	Tennis	Men's Singles	1958
Silver	Desideria Ampon	Tennis	Women's Singles	1958
Bronze	Johnny Jose	Tennis	Men's Singles	1958
Bronze	Miguel Dungo	Tennis	Men's Singles	1958
Gold	Johnny Jose	Tennis	Men's Singles	1962
Bronze	Patricia Yngayo	Tennis	Women's Singles	1962
Bronze	Desideria Ampon	Tennis	Women's Singles	1962
Bronze	Jesus Hernandez	Tennis	Men's Singles	1966
Bronze	Cecil Mamiit	Tennis	Men's Singles	2006
Bronze	Alexandra Eala	Tennis	Women's Singles	2022

Doubles

Medal	Name	Sport	Event	Year
Gold	Felicisimo Ampon; Raymundo Deyro	Tennis	Men's Doubles	1958
Silver	Johnny Jose; Miguel Dungo	Tennis	Men's Doubles	1958
Silver	Desideria Ampon; Patricia Yngayo	Tennis	Women's Doubles	1958
Silver	Johnny Jose; Reymundo Deyro	Tennis	Men's Doubles	1962
Bronze	Miguel Dungo; Guillermo Hernandez	Tennis	Men's Doubles	1962
Bronze	Desideria Ampon; Patricia Yngayo	Tennis	Women's Doubles	1962
Silver	Desideria Ampon; Patricia Yngayo	Tennis	Women's Doubles	1966

Mixed doubles

Medal	Name	Sport	Event	Year
Silver	Miguel Dungo; Patricia Yngayo	Tennis	Mixed Doubles	1958
Bronze	Felicisimo Ampon; Desideria Ampon	Tennis	Mixed Doubles	1958
Bronze	Miguel Dungo; Desideria Ampon	Tennis	Mixed Doubles	1962
Silver	Patricia Yngayo; Federico Deyro	Tennis	Mixed Doubles	1966
Bronze	Francis Alcantara; Alexandra Eala	Tennis	Mixed Doubles	2022

Team

Medal	Name	Sport	Event	Year
Silver	Johnny Jose; Reymundo Deyro; Miguel Dungo; Guillermo Hernandez	Tennis	Men's Team	1962
Bronze	Desideria Ampon; Patricia Yngano	Tennis	Women's Team	1962
Bronze	Desideria Ampon; Patricia Yngano	Tennis	Women's Team	1966
Bronze	Jesus Hernandez; Augusto Villanueva; Delfin Contreras; Federico Deyro	Tennis	Men's Team	1966

=== Volleyball ===
Year introduced: 1958
First medal : 1962
Last medal: 1962

Medal	Name	Sport	Event	Year
Bronze	Julius Baldesimo; Teofilo Benito; Guillermo Blanco; Domingo Cuenca; Agapito Custodio; Rodolfo Gonzales; Ruben Labay; Isaac Limosnero; Florencio Longakit; Rodolfo Manuel; Ildefonso Mariquit; Alfredo Mercado; Francisco Orante	Volleyball	Men's Volleyball Nine-a-side	1962

=== Weightlifting ===
Weightlifting has one gold medal courtesy of Hidilyn Diaz in 2018.

Year introduced: 1951
First medal : 1951
Last medal: 2022

Bantamweight

Medal	Name	Sport	Event	Year
Bronze	Pedro Landero	Weightlifting	Men's Bantamweight 56kg	1951
Silver	Rodolfo Caparas	Weightlifting	Men's Bantamweight 56kg	1954
Bronze	Alberto Nogar	Weightlifting	Men's Bantamweight 56kg	1958

Featherweight

Medal	Name	Sport	Event	Year
Silver	Rodrigo del Rosario	Weightlifting	Men's Featherweight 60kg	1951
Silver	Rodrigo del Rosario	Weightlifting	Men's Featherweight 60kg	1954
Gold	Hidilyn Diaz	Weightlifting	Women's Featherweight 53kg	2018

Flyweight

Medal	Name	Sport	Event	Year
Silver	Salvador del Rosario	Weightlifting	Men's Flyweight 52kg	1970

Middle Heavyweight

Medal	Name	Sport	Event	Year
Silver	Pedro del Mundo	Weightlifting	Men's Middle Heavyweight 90kg	1954
Bronze	Joaquin Vasquez	Weightlifting	Men's Middle Heavyweight 90kg	1954

Welterweight

Medal	Name	Sport	Event	Year
Bronze	Elreen Ando	Weightlifting	Women's Welterweight 64kg	2022

=== Wrestling ===
Year introduced: 1954
First medal : 1954
Last medal: 1954

Featherweight

Medal	Name	Sport	Event	Year
Silver	Mansueto Napilay	Wrestling	Men's Featherweight 62kg	1954

Flyweight

Medal	Name	Sport	Event	Year
Bronze	Basilio Fabila	Wrestling	Men's Flyweight 52kg	1954

Middleweight

Medal	Name	Sport	Event	Year
Silver	Nicolas Arcales	Wrestling	Men's Middleweight 79kg	1954

=== Wushu ===
Rene Catalan is the lone gold medal winner for Wushu.

Year introduced: 1990
First medal : 1994
Last medal: 2022

Taolu

Medal	Name	Sport	Event	Year
Bronze	Richard Ng	Wushu	Men's Taolu Nanquan	1994
Bronze	Daniel Go	Wushu	Men's Taolu Taijiquan	1994
Silver	Mark Robert Rosales	Wushu	Men's Taolu Changquan	1998
Bronze	Arvin Ting	Wushu	Men's Taolu Changquan	2002
Bronze	Bobby Co	Wushu	Men's Taolu Taijiquan	2002
Silver	Daniel Parantac	Wushu	Men's Taolu Taijijian/Taijiquan	2014
Bronze	Agatha Wong	Wushu	Women's Taolu Taijiquan/Taijijian	2018
Bronze	Jones Inso	Wushu	Men's Taolu Taijiquan/Taijijian	2022

Sanda

Medal	Name	Sport	Event	Year
Silver	Rolly Chulhang	Wushu	Men's Sanda 52kg	1998
Bronze	Roger Chulhang	Wushu	Men's Sanda 56kg	1998
Bronze	Jerome Lumabas	Wushu	Men's Sanda 70kg	1998
Silver	Marvin Sicomen	Wushu	Men's Sanda 52kg	2002
Silver	Rexel Nganhayna	Wushu	Men's Sanda 56kg	2002
Bronze	Eduard Folayang	Wushu	Men's Sanda 65kg	2002
Gold	Rene Catalan	Wushu	Men's Sanda 52kg	2006
Silver	Eduard Folayang	Wushu	Men's Sanda 70kg	2006
Bronze	Mark Eddiva	Wushu	Men's Sanda 65kg	2010
Silver	Jean Claude Saclag	Wushu	Men's Sanda 60kg	2014
Bronze	Francisco Solis	Wushu	Men's Sanda 56kg	2014
Bronze	Divine Wally	Wushu	Women's Sanda 52kg	2018
Silver	Arnel Mandal	Wushu	Men's Sanda 56kg	2022
Bronze	Gideon Fred Padua	Wushu	Men's Sanda 60kg	2022
Bronze	Clemente Tabugara Jr.	Wushu	Men's Sanda 65kg	2022
