= Philippines at the 1958 Asian Games =

- IOC code: PHI
- NOC: Philippine Olympic Committee
- Website: www.olympic.ph (in English)

in Tokyo
- Medals Ranked 2nd: Gold 8 Silver 19 Bronze 20 Total 47

Asian Games appearances (overview)
- 1951; 1954; 1958; 1962; 1966; 1970; 1974; 1978; 1982; 1986; 1990; 1994; 1998; 2002; 2006; 2010; 2014; 2018; 2022; 2026

The Philippines participated in the 1958 Asian Games held in Tokyo, Japan from May 24 to June 1, 1958. The country ranked 2nd with 9 gold medals, 19 silver medals and 21 bronze medals. This edition of the Asiad has been the most fruitful for the Philippines in terms of the total number of medals garnered.

== Asian Games performance ==
148 athletes participated and they joined in 12 sports. Inocencia Solis was crowned Asia's fastest woman with a 12.5 second clocking, she also won the silver medal as part of the 4x100 near relay squad of Rogelia Ferrer, Francisca Sanopal and Irene Penuela.

The basketball squad won its third consecutive Asian Cage title.

== Medalists ==
=== Gold ===
No.	Medal	Name	Sport	Event
1	Gold	Remegio Vista; Isaac Gomez; Pedro Subido; Enrique Bautista	Athletics	Men's 4x100m Relay
2	Gold	Inocencia Solis	Athletics	Women's 100m
3	Gold	Visitacion Badana	Athletics	Women's Long Jump
4	Gold	Emilio Achacoso; Kurt Bachmann; Carlos Badion; Loreto Carbonell; Francisco Lagarejos; Eduardo Lim; Carlos Loyzaga; Ramon Manulat; Leonardo Marquicias; Constancio Ortiz; Mariano Tolentino; Antonio Villamor; Martin Urra; Francis Wilson; Coach: Valentin Eduque	Basketball	Men's Team
5	Gold	Adolfo Feliciano	Shooting	300m Rifle 3
6	Gold	Jocelyn von Giese; Victoria Cagayat; Sandra von Giese; Haydee Coloso-Espino	Swimming	Women's 4x100m Medley Relay
7	Gold	Raymundo Deyro	Tennis	Men's Singles
8	Gold	Felicisimo Ampon; Raymundo Deyro	Tennis	Men's Doubles

=== Silver ===
No.	Medal	Name	Sport	Event
1	Silver	Pablo Somblingo	Athletics	Men's 400m
2	Silver	Francisca Sanopal	Athletics	Women's 80m Hurdles
3	Silver	Inocencia Solis; Rogelia Ferrer; Irene Penuela; Francisca Sanopal	Athletics	Women's 4x100m Relay
4	Silver	Lolita Lagrosas	Athletics	Women's High Jump
5	Silver	Dionisio Guevarra	Boxing	Featherweight 57kg
6	Silver	Martin Gison	Shooting	25m Rapid Fire Pistol
7	Silver	Cesar Jayme	Shooting	50m Rifle Prone
8	Silver	Agapito Lozada; Ulpiano Babol; Bana Sailani; Dakula Arabani	Swimming	Men's 4x200m Freestyle
9	Silver	Rodolfo Agustin; Jacinto Cayco; Freddie Elizalde; Dakula Arabani	Swimming	Men's 4x100m Medley Relay
10	Silver	Haydee Coloso-Espino	Swimming	Women's 100m Freestyle
11	Silver	Haydee Coloso-Espino	Swimming	Women's 200m Fresstyle
12	Silver	Gertrudes Lozada	Swimming	Women's 400m Freestyle
13	Silver	Sandra von Giese	Swimming	Women's 100m Butterfly
14	Silver	Victoria Cullen; Corazon Lozada; Gertrudes Lozada; Haydee Coloso-Espino	Swimming	Men's 4x100m Freestyle
15	Silver	Felicisimo Ampon	Tennis	Men's Singles
16	Silver	Johnny Jose; Miguel Dungo	Tennis	Men's Doubles
17	Silver	Desideria Ampon	Tennis	Women's Singles
18	Silver	Desideria Ampon; Patricia Yngayo	Tennis	Women's Doubles
19	Silver	Miguel Dungo; Patricia Yngayo	Tennis	Mixed Doubles

=== Silver ===
No.	Medal	Name	Sport	Event
1	Bronze	Isaac Gomez	Athletics	Men's 100m
2	Bronze	Enrique Bautista	Athletics	Men's 200m
3	Bronze	Erasma Arellano; Aparicio Mequl; Antonio Suplido; Pablo Somblingo	Athletics	Men's 4x400m Relay
4	Bronze	Manolita Cinco	Athletics	Women's 80m Hurdles
5	Bronze	Jacinto Diaz	Boxing	Bantamweight 54kg
6	Bronze	Celedonio Espinosa	Boxing	Lightweight 60kg
7	Bronze	Adolfo Feliciano	Shooting	50m Rifle 3
8	Bronze	Enrique Beech	Shooting	Trap
9	Bronze	Bana Sailani	Swimming	Men's 400m Freestyle
10	Bronze	Bana Sailani	Swimming	Men's 1500m Freestyle
11	Bronze	Rodolfo Agustin	Swimming	Men's 100m Backstroke
12	Bronze	Lorenzo Cortez	Swimming	Men's 200m Backstroke
13	Bronze	Walter Brown	Swimming	Men's 100m Butterfly
14	Bronze	Freddie Elizalde	Swimming	Men's 200m Butterfly
15	Bronze	Sylvia von Giese	Swimming	Women's 100m Backstroke
16	Bronze	Victoria Cagayat	Swimming	Women's 200m Breaststroke
17	Bronze	Johnny Jose	Tennis	Men's Singles
18	Bronze	Miguel Dungo	Tennis	Men's Singles
19	Bronze	Felicisimo Ampon; Desideria Ampon	Tennis	Mixed Doubles
20	Bronze	Alberto Nogar	Weightlifting	Bantamweight 56kg

=== Multiple ===
Name	Sport	Gold	Silver	Bronze	Total
Raymundo Deyro	Tennis	2	0	0	2
Haydee Coloso-Espino	Swimming	1	3	0	4
Felicisimo Ampon	Tennis	1	1	1	3
Inocencia Solis	Athletics	1	1	0	2
Sandra von Giese	Swimming	1	1	0	2
Adolfo Feliciano	Shooting	1	0	1	2
Enrique Bautista	Athletics	1	0	1	2
Isaac Gomez	Athletics	1	0	1	2
Victoria Cagayat	Swimming	1	0	1	2
Bana Sailani	Swimming	0	2	1	3
Desideria Ampon	Tennis	0	2	1	3
Miguel Dungo	Tennis	0	2	1	3
Dakula Arabani	Swimming	0	2	0	2
Francisca Sanopal	Athletics	0	2	0	2
Gertrudes Lozada	Swimming	0	2	0	2
Patricia Yngayo	Tennis	0	2	0	2
Freddie Elizalde	Swimming	0	1	1	2
Johnny Jose	Tennis	0	1	1	2
Pablo Somblingo	Athletics	0	1	1	2
Rodolfo Agustin	Swimming	0	1	1	2

== Medal summary ==
=== Medals by sports ===
Sport	Gold	Silver	Bronze	Total
Athletics	3	4	4	11
Tennis	2	5	3	10
Swimming	1	7	8	16
Shooting	1	2	2	5
Basketball	1	0	0	1
Boxing	0	1	2	3
Weightlifting	0	0	1	1
Totals (7 entries)	8	19	20	47
