= Philippines at the 1960 Summer Olympics =

- Flag of the Philippines
- IOC code: PHI (FIL used at these Games)
- NOC: Philippine Amateur Athletic Federation

in Rome
- Competitors: 40 (36 men, 4 women) in 7 sports
- Medals: Gold 0 Silver 0 Bronze 0 Total 0

Summer Olympics appearances (overview)
- 1924; 1928; 1932; 1936; 1948; 1952; 1956; 1960; 1964; 1968; 1972; 1976; 1980; 1984; 1988; 1992; 1996; 2000; 2004; 2008; 2012; 2016; 2020; 2024

The Philippines competed at the 1960 Summer Olympics in Rome, Italy. 40 competitors, 36 men and 4 women, took part in 27 events in 7 sports.

== Basketball ==
- Preliminary Round (Group D)

- Lost to Poland (68-86)
- Defeated Spain (84-82)
- Lost to Uruguay (76-80)

- Classification 9-16 (Group C)

- Defeated Puerto Rico (82-80)
- Defeated Bulgaria (2-0, forfeit)
- Lost to Hungary (70-81)

- Classification 9-12

- Lost to France (75-122)
- Defeated Mexico (65-64) → 11th place

- Team Roster
  - Emilio Achacoso
  - Kurt Bachmann
  - Carlos Badion (c)
  - Narciso Bernardo
  - Geronimo "Gerry" Cruz
  - Felix Flores (alternate)
  - Alfonso "Boy" Marquez
  - Edgardo Ocampo
  - Constancio Ortiz
  - Eduardo Pacheco
  - Cristobal Ramas
  - Edgardo Roque
  - Roberto Yburan
  - Head Coach – Arturo Rius

== Shooting ==
Seven sport shooters, all male, represented the Philippines in 1960.

25 m pistol

- Horacio Miranda

50 m pistol

- José Agdamag

300 m rifle, three positions

- Adolfo Feliciano

50 m rifle, three positions

- Adolfo Feliciano
- Bernardo San Juan

50 m rifle, prone

- Hernando Castelo
- César Jayme

Trap

- Enrique Beech

== Swimming ==
Men

Athlete	Event	Heat		Semifinal		Final	
Athlete	Event	Time	Rank	Time	Rank	Time	Rank
Freddie Elizalde	100 m freestyle	1:03.0	46	Did not advance			
Bana Sailani	400 m freestyle	4:40.2	21	—N/a		Did not advance	
Bana Sailani	1500 m freestyle	18:18.8	10	—N/a		Did not advance	
Lorenzo Cortez	100 m backstroke	1:08.7	31	Did not advance			
Antonio Saloso	200 m breaststroke	2:53.3	33	Did not advance			
Amir Hussin Hamsain	200 m butterfly	2:27.9	22	Did not advance			
Ahiron Radjae	200 m butterfly	2:39.8	31	Did not advance			
Lorenzo Cortez; Antonio Saloso; Freddie Elizalde; Bana Sailani	4 × 100 m medley	4:28.0	15	—N/a		Did not advance	

Women

Athlete	Event	Heat		Semifinal		Final	
Athlete	Event	Time	Rank	Time	Rank	Time	Rank
Haydée Coloso	100 m freestyle	1:07.8	25	Did not advance			
Sandra von Giese	100 m butterfly	1:16.3	16	—N/a		Did not advance	
Gertrudes Lozada	100 m butterfly	DNS		—N/a		Did not advance	

== Weightlifting ==
Featherweight

- Alberto Nogar → 8th place
