= Philippines at the 1956 Summer Olympics =

- Flag of the Philippines
- IOC code: PHI
- NOC: Philippine Amateur Athletic Federation

in Melbourne/Stockholm
- Competitors: 39 (35 men, 4 women) in 7 sports
- Flag bearer: Gertrudez Lozada
- Medals: Gold 0 Silver 0 Bronze 0 Total 0

Summer Olympics appearances (overview)
- 1924; 1928; 1932; 1936; 1948; 1952; 1956; 1960; 1964; 1968; 1972; 1976; 1980; 1984; 1988; 1992; 1996; 2000; 2004; 2008; 2012; 2016; 2020; 2024

The Philippines competed at the 1956 Summer Olympics in Melbourne, Australia. 39 competitors, 35 men and 4 women, took part in 30 events in 7 sports.

A resolution was filed at the Philippine Congress which sought a Philippine boycott of the 1956 Summer Olympics as a protest against the White Australia policy which targeted immigrants with an Asian background. The country nevertheless participated at the Games.

The Philippine Amateur Athletic Federation (PAAF) named the 39 athletes and four coaches in a special luncheon meeting at the Philippine Columbian Clubhouse. Antonio de las Alas, PAAF President, headed the Philippine delegation to Melbourne.

== Philippine Olympic team lineups ==
- Basketball:
  - Carlos Badion
  - Rafael Barretto
  - Ramoncito Campos
  - Loreto Carbonell
  - Antonio Genato (c)
  - Eduardo "Eddie" Lim
  - Carlos "Caloy" Loyzaga
  - Ramón Manulat
  - Leonardo Marquicias
  - Mariano Tolentino
  - Martin Urra
  - Antonio Villamor
  - Coach: Leo Prieto
- Track and Field:
  - Pablo Somblingo (400-meter hurdles)
  - Ciriaco Baronda (high jump)
  - Manolita Cinco and Francisca Sanopal (80-meter hurdles)
  - Coach: Jose Ravello
- Swimming:
  - Bana Sailani (400-meter freestyle and 1,500-meter freestyle)
  - Parsons Nabiula (200-meter breastroke and 200-meter butterfly)
  - Agapito Lozada (200-meter butterfly)
  - Pedro Cayco (100-meter backstroke)
  - Dakula Arabani (200-meter freestyle)
  - Gertrudez Lozada (100-meter freestyle and 400-meter freestyle)
  - Jocelyn Von Giese (100-meter backstroke)
  - Coach: Edilberto Bonus
- Boxing:
  - Federico Bonus (Flyweight)
  - Alberto Adela (Bantamweight)
  - Paulino Melendrez (Featherweight)
  - Celedonio Espinosa (Lightweight)
  - Manuel delos Santos (Middleweight)
  - Coach: Celestino Enriquez
- Wrestling:
  - Nicolas Arcales (Middleweight, acting coach)
  - Mateo Tanaquin (Lightweight)
  - Ernesto Ramel (Bantamweight)
- Weightlifting:
  - Pedro Landero (Bantamweight)
  - Rodrigo del Rosario (Featherweight)
- Shooting:
  - Teodoro Kalaw, Jr (Team Captain)
  - Cesar Jayme
  - Martin Gison
  - Ricardo Hizon
  - Hernando Castelo
  - Enrique Beech

== Basketball ==
- Preliminary Round (Group A)

- Defeated Thailand (55-44)
- Defeated Japan (76-61)
- Lost to United States (53-121)

- Quarterfinals (Group A)

- Lost to Uruguay (70-79)
- Defeated France (65-58)
- Lost to Chile (69-88)

- Classification 5-8

- Lost to Bulgaria (70-80)

- Classification 7/8

- Defeated Chile (75-58) → did not advance, 7th place

== Shooting ==
Five sport shooters, all male, represented the Philippines in 1956.

25 m pistol

- Martin Gison

50 m pistol

- Ricardo Hizon

300 m rifle, three positions

- Martin Gison

50 m rifle, prone

- Hernando Castelo
- César Jayme

Trap

- Enrique Beech

== Swimming ==
Men

Athlete	Event	Heat		Semifinal		Final	
Athlete	Event	Time	Rank	Time	Rank	Time	Rank
Dakula Arabani	100 m freestyle	1:00.2	=28	Did not advance			
Ulfiano Babol	400 m freestyle	4:53.4	30	—N/a		Did not advance	
Bana Sailani	400 m freestyle	4:49.0	24	—N/a		Did not advance	
Bana Sailani	1500 m freestyle	19:16.8	14	—N/a		Did not advance	
Pedro Cayco	100 m backstroke	1:11.6	23	Did not advance			
Palsons Naibula	200 m breaststroke	DSQ		—N/a		Did not advance	
Agapito Lozada	200 m butterfly	2:43.5	14	—N/a		Did not advance	
Palsons Naibula	200 m butterfly	3:03.2	18	—N/a		Did not advance	
Dakula Arabani; Agapito Lozada; Bana Sailani; Ulfiano Babol	4 × 200 m freestyle	9:05.7	11	—N/a		Did not advance	

Women

Athlete	Event	Heat		Semifinal		Final	
Athlete	Event	Time	Rank	Time	Rank	Time	Rank
Gertrudez Lozada	100 m freestyle	1:13.7	35	Did not advance			
Gertrudez Lozada	400 m freestyle	5:34.2	26	—N/a		Did not advance	
Jocelyn von Giese	100 m backstroke	1:20.0	22	—N/a		Did not advance	
