= 1958 Asian Games medal table =

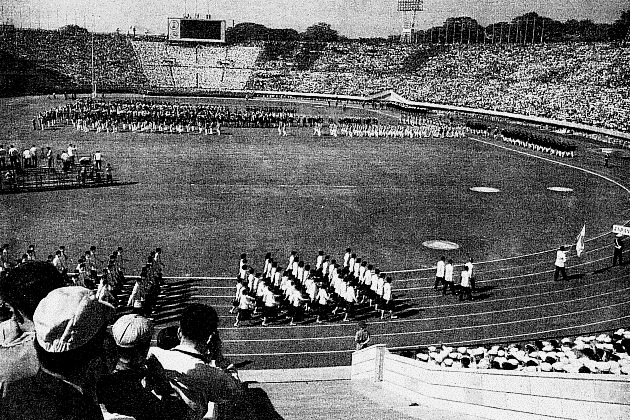
- The opening ceremony of the Games was organised at the National Olympic Stadium
- Location: Tokyo, Japan

Highlights
- Most gold medals: Japan 67
- Most total medals: Japan 138
- Medalling NOCs: 16

The 1958 Asian Games, officially known as the Third Asian Games (Japanese: 第3回アジア競技大会), was a multi-sport event held in Tokyo, Japan, from 24 May to 1 June 1958. A record total of 1,820 athletes representing 20 Asian National Olympic Committees (NOCs) participated in 13 sports divided into 97 events. The tradition of the torch relay was introduced for the first time in the Asian Games, and the Games cauldron was ignited by the first Japanese Olympic gold medallist and the first Asian Olympic champion in an individual event, Mikio Oda.

Athletes from 16 nations earned medals at the Games, and athletes from 11 of these nations won at least one gold medal. Indian national record holder in 200– and 400 metres, Milkha Singh, won gold medals in both the events and set a new Asian Games record in 400 metres. 1956 Melbourne Olympics silver medallist in 400– and 1500 metres freestyle events, Tsuyoshi Yamanaka, won gold medals in these two events. The Japanese 4×100 metres medley relay team of Keiji Hase (backstroke), Masaru Furukawa (breaststroke), Manabu Koga (freestyle) and Takashi Ishimoto (butterfly) won the gold medal with a time of 4:17.2 and broke the world record.

A total of 350 medals (112 gold, 112 silver and 126 bronze) were awarded. Only the Republic of China managed to improve its position in the medal table compared to the 1954 Asian Games. The host nation, Japan, topped the medal table for the third consecutive time in the history of the Games, having collected almost 60% of the total gold medals; it also secured the most silver and bronze medals. Competitors from the host of the 1954 Games, the Philippines, won 48 medals (including eight gold) and helped their nation to be seated at the second place on overall medal tally. South Korean athletes improved their total medal count by eight from 1954, earning third spot on the table.

== Medal table ==
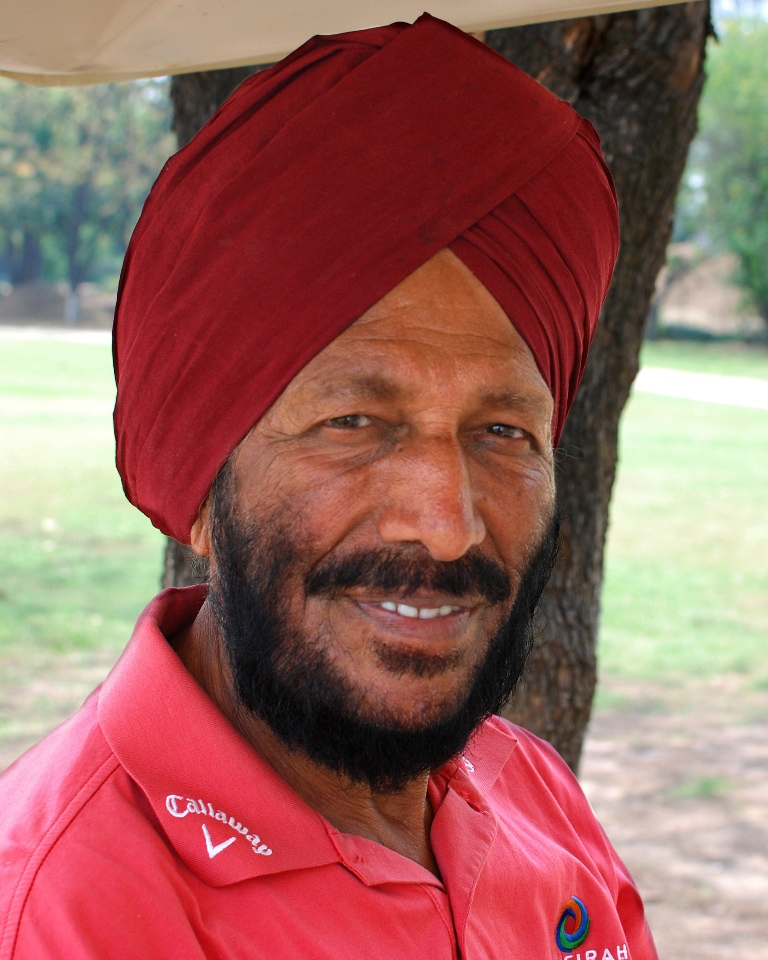
Milkha Singh won two gold medals in athletics with a new Asian Games record in 400 metres

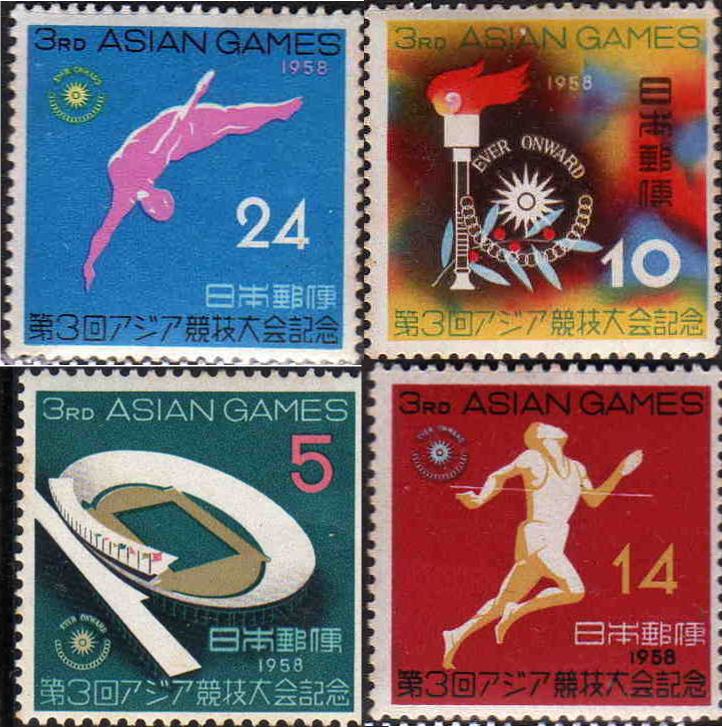
Stamps released by the Japan Government during the Games

The ranking in this table is consistent with International Olympic Committee convention in its published medal tables. By default, the table is ordered by the number of gold medals the athletes from a nation have won (in this context, a nation is an entity represented by a NOC). The number of silver medals is taken into consideration next, followed by the number of bronze medals. If nations are still tied, equal ranking is given; they are listed alphabetically by IOC country code.

The total number of bronze medals is greater than the total number of gold or silver medals because two bronze medals were awarded per event in three sports: boxing, table tennis and tennis.

* Host nation (Japan)

Rank	Nation	Gold	Silver	Bronze	Total
1	Japan (JPN)*	67	41	30	138
2	Philippines (PHI)	8	19	21	48
3	South Korea (KOR)	8	7	12	27
4	Iran (IRN)	7	14	11	32
5	Republic of China (ROC)	6	11	17	34
6	Pakistan (PAK)	6	11	9	26
7	India (IND)	5	4	4	13
8	South Vietnam (VNM)	2	0	4	6
9	Burma (BIR)	1	2	1	4
10	Singapore (SIN)	1	1	1	3
11	Ceylon (CEY)	1	0	1	2
12	Thailand (THA)	0	1	3	4
13	Hong Kong (HKG)	0	1	1	2
14	Indonesia (INA)	0	0	6	6
15	Malaya (MAL)	0	0	3	3
16	Israel (ISR)	0	0	2	2
Totals (16 entries)		112	112	126	350

== See also ==
- All-time Asian Games medal table
