= Haydée Coloso-Espino =

Filipino swimmer (1937–2021)

Personal information
- National team: Philippines
- Born: August 28, 1937 Dueñas, Iloilo, Philippine Commonwealth
- Died: August 12, 2021 (aged 83) Iloilo City, Philippines

Sport
- Sport: Swimming
- Strokes: Freestyle, Butterfly
Medal record
Representing the Philippines
Event	1st	2nd	3rd
Asian Games	3	5	2
Total	3	5	2
Women's swimming
Representing the Philippines
Asian Games
Gold medal – first place	1954 Manila	100 m freestyle
Gold medal – first place	1954 Manila	100 m butterfly
Gold medal – first place	1958 Tokyo	4 × 100 m medley relay
Silver medal – second place	1954 Manila	4 × 100 m freestyle relay
Silver medal – second place	1958 Tokyo	100 m freestyle
Silver medal – second place	1958 Tokyo	200 m freestyle
Silver medal – second place	1958 Tokyo	4 × 100 m freestyle relay
Silver medal – second place	1962 Jakarta	4 × 100 m freestyle relay
Bronze medal – third place	1962 Jakarta	100 m freestyle
Bronze medal – third place	1962 Jakarta	4 × 100 m medley relay

Haydée Coloso-Espino (August 28, 1937 – August 12, 2021) was a Filipino swimmer who competed at the 1960 Summer Olympics in Rome as well as the Asian Games on three occasions.

== Career ==
Once dubbed as “Asia's Swim Queen," Coloso-Espino won a total of ten medals from the 1954 Asian Games, 1958 Asian Games and 1962 Asian Games. Of those medals, three were gold, five were silver, and two were bronze. Her gold medals came from the 100-meter freestyle and butterfly events.

Coloso was just 16 years old when she won two gold medals and a silver medal at the 1954 Asian Games in Manila. She came from behind to beat Japanese swimmers Tomiko Atarashi and Shizue Miyabe in the 100m freestyle final at the Rizal Memorial Sports Complex pool. She also led the hosts to a sweep of the 100m butterfly with Norma Yldefonso and Sandra von Giese taking the silver and bronze medals, respectively. In the 4 x 100m freestyle relay, she teamed up with Sonia von Giese, Gertrudes Vito and Nimfa Lim to win the silver medal behind Japan.

Following her outstanding performance at the 1954 Asiad, Coloso-Espino was a shoo-in to make the national team to the 1956 Summer Olympics. However, she became pregnant before the meet and had to take a time off from competitive swimming.

She was chosen as Woman Swimmer of the Year for three consecutive years (1953, 1954 and 1955) by the Philippine Sportswriters Association.

Coloso-Espino resumed her swimming career after giving birth and won four more medals at the 1958 Asian Games in Tokyo. She anchored the victorious 4 x 100m medley relay quartet that included Jocelyn von Giese, Victoria Cagayat and Sandra von Giese. She also won silver medals in the 100m freestyle, 200m freestyle and 4 x 100m freestyle relay along with Victoria Cullen, Corazon Lozada and Gertrudes Lozada.

Two years later, Coloso-Espino saw action in the 100m freestyle at the 1960 Summer Olympics in Rome, but did not get past the heats. She capped her swimming career by winning three more medals at the 1962 Asian Games in Jakarta.

== Retirement ==
After her stint at the 1962 Asiad, Coloso-Espino retired from competitive swimming and became an educator. She briefly resided overseas but returned to her ancestral house in Iloilo to raise her seven children. She taught at the Far Eastern University, her alma mater, Lyceum of the Philippines and Araullo High School. She retired from teaching in 1993.

== Death ==
On January 16, 2020, Coloso-Espino was admitted at the Medicus Medical Center in Iloilo, due to chronic respiratory infection. She was able to recover from hospitalization but remained frail and asthmatic. Later confined in her residence in Mandurriao in Iloilo City, she died on August 12, 2021, sixteen days before her 84th birthday.

== Legacy ==
With ten medals (3 gold, 5 silver and 2 bronze medals), Coloso-Espino holds the record for the most number of medals won by a Filipino athlete - male or female - in the Asian Games.

She and fellow swimmer Jocelyn von Giese were the first Filipina athletes to win gold medals in the Asian Games. She is one of few Pinays to win at least three gold medals in the quadrennial multi-sport meet, along with sprinter Mona Sulaiman and bowler Bong Coo.

In 2016, Coloso-Espino was inducted into the Philippine Sports Hall of Fame as part of the second batch of inductees. She is the first Filipina swimmer to earn the accolade.
