= Swimming at the 1956 Summer Olympics – Men's 400 metre freestyle =

Men's 400 metre freestyle at the Games of the XVI Olympiad
- Venue: Melbourne Sports and Entertainment Centre
- Dates: 1 December 1956 (heats); 4 December 1956 (final)
- Competitors: 32 from 19 nations
- Winning time: 4:27.3 WR

Medalists
1st place, gold medalist(s)		Murray Rose; Australia
2nd place, silver medalist(s)		Tsuyoshi Yamanaka; Japan
3rd place, bronze medalist(s)		George Breen; United States

The men's 400 metre freestyle event at the 1956 Olympic Games took place between 1 and 4 December. This swimming event used freestyle swimming, which means that the method of the stroke is not regulated (unlike backstroke, breaststroke, and butterfly events). Nearly all swimmers use the front crawl or a variant of that stroke. Because an Olympic-size swimming pool is 50 metres long, this race consisted of eight lengths of the pool.

== Results ==
=== Heats ===
Five heats were held; the swimmers with the fastest eight times advanced to the Finals. The swimmers that advanced are highlighted.

==== Heat One ====
Rank	Athlete	Country	Time
1	Kevin O'Halloran	Australia	4:36.9
2	Koji Nonoshita	Japan	4:37.4
3	Angelo Romani	Italy	4:37.6
4	Bill Woolsey	United States	4:38.2
5	Silvio dos Santos	Brazil	4:48.8
6	Ulfiano Babol	Philippines	4:53.4
7	Wan Shiu Ming	Hong Kong	5:02.6

==== Heat Two ====
Rank	Athlete	Country	Time
1	Jack Wardrop	Great Britain	4:39.8
2	Tony Briscoe	South Africa	4:41.4
3	George Onekea	United States	4:41.6
4	Hans Köhler	Germany	4:43.5
5	Habib Nasution	Indonesia	4:44.0
6	Per-Olof Östrand	Sweden	4:45.9
7	Gilberto Martínez	Colombia	4:51.4
8	Raúl Martín	Cuba	4:58.2

==== Heat Three ====
Rank	Athlete	Country	Time
1	George Breen	United States	4:35.7
2	Peter Duncan	South Africa	4:46.7
3	Karri Käyhkö	Finland	4:49.6
4	Yoshiro Noda	Japan	4:49.9
5	Guy Montserrat	France	4:52.6

==== Heat Four ====
Rank	Athlete	Country	Time
1	Gary Winram	Australia	4:34.5
2	Jean Boiteux	France	4:37.9
3	William Slater	Canada	4:40.4
4	Neil McKechnie	Great Britain	4:42.6
5	Boris Nik'it'ini	Soviet Union	4:42.8
6	Billy Steuart	South Africa	4:43.0
7	Bana Sailani	Philippines	4:49.0

==== Heat Five ====
Rank	Athlete	Country	Time
1	Murray Rose	Australia	4:31.7
2	Tsuyoshi Yamanaka	Japan	4:31.8
3	Hans Zierold	Germany	4:35.7
4	Jenő Áts	Hungary	4:47.6
5	Jacques Collignon	France	4:49.3

=== Final ===
Rank	Athlete	Country	Time	Notes
1	Murray Rose	Australia	4:27.3	WR
2	Tsuyoshi Yamanaka	Japan	4:30.4	
3	George Breen	United States	4:32.5	
4	Kevin O'Halloran	Australia	4:32.9	
5	Hans Zierold	United Team of Germany	4:34.6	
6	Gary Winram	Australia	4:34.9	
7	Koji Nonoshita	Japan	4:38.2	
8	Angelo Romani	Italy	4:41.7	

Key: WR = World record
