= Jinno =

Jinno (written: 神野) is a Japanese surname. Notable people with the surname include:

- Hitomi Jinno (神野 眸, born 1937), Japanese swimmer
- Masahide Jinno (神野 正英, born 1948), Japanese sprinter
- Takuya Jinno (神野 卓哉, born 1970), Japanese footballer
