= Franco Marquicias =

Filipino basketball player

Charles Borck
Personal information
- Born: December 17, 1905 Tondo, Manila, Philippine Islands
- Died: April 20, 1982 (aged 76) Navotas, Philippines
- Listed height: 5 ft 11 in (180 cm)

Franco Polintan Marquicias (December 17, 1905 – April 20, 1982, in Navotas) was a Filipino basketball player. He was a member of the Philippine team to the 1936 Berlin Olympics, a national player several times and one of the best known Filipino cager ever developed. He is the father of Leonardo Marquicias.

The late Franco Marquicias was also a member of the 1927 Philippine quintet that snagged the Far Eastern Olympic Championship in Shanghai, the 1934 Philippine team that copped the Olympic championship in Manila and the 1936 team that placed fifth in the 11th Olympiad held in Berlin, Germany, the highest the Philippines ever placed in an Olympic basketball competition. His later years saw him as a playing coach for Heacock and mentored his team to a worthy runner-up finish in the MICAA tournament.

During the ceremonies in the 1976 Montreal Olympics, Marquicias became a recipient of a citation award by the International Federation of Amateur Basketball.
