= Yoshiro Noda =

Japanese swimmer

Personal information
- Born: 23 March 1936 (age 90)

Sport
- Sport: Swimming

Yoshiro Noda (野田 芳郎, Noda Yoshirō; born 23 March 1936) is a Japanese former swimmer. He competed in the men's 400 metre freestyle at the 1956 Summer Olympics.
