= Masayo Aoki =

Japanese swimmer (born 1935)

Personal information
- Born: 9 December 1935 (age 90)

Sport
- Sport: Swimming
- Strokes: Breaststroke
Medal record
Women's swimming
Representing Japan
Asian Games
Gold medal – first place	1954 Manila	200 m breaststroke
Silver medal – second place	1958 Tokyo	100 m breaststroke

Masayo Aoki (青木 政代, Aoki Masayo; born 9 December 1935) is a Japanese former swimmer. She competed in the women's 200 metre breaststroke at the 1952 Summer Olympics.
