= Yoshiko Takamatsu =

Japanese swimmer (born 1938)

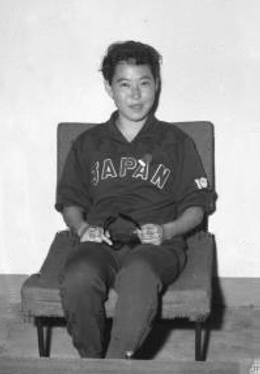
- Takamatsu at the 1960 Olympics

Personal information
- Born: 16 April 1938 (age 88) Wakayama, Japan
- Height: 1.65 m (5 ft 5 in)
- Weight: 64 kg (141 lb)

Sport
- Sport: Swimming
Medal record
Representing Japan
Asian Games
Gold medal – first place	1958 Tokyo	100 m breaststroke
Gold medal – first place	1958 Tokyo	200 m breaststroke

Yoshiko Takamatsu (高松 好子, Takamatsu Yoshiko; born 16 April 1938) is a retired Japanese breaststroke swimmer who won the 100 m and 200 m events at the 1958 Asian Games in Tokyo. She competed in the 200 m breaststroke at the 1960 Summer Olympics, but failed to reach the final, while her 4×100 metres medley relay team finished seventh.
