= Sambiao Basanung =

Filipino swimmer

Personal information
- Born: 11 June 1922
- Died: 15 November 1981 (aged 59) Tabuelan, Philippines

Sport
- Sport: Swimming
- College team: Letran

Sambiao Basanung (11 June 1922 – 15 November 1981) was a Filipino swimmer. He competed at the 1948 Summer Olympics and the 1952 Summer Olympics.

== Career ==
In college, Basanung led Letran to a swimming championship in 1938.

Some time after he competed in the 1948 Summer Olympics, Basanung discovered Bana Sailani, a young swimmer from Sulu with potential. In 1949, he brought him to Manila, helping him train. He also coached the University of San Carlos swim team, helping them win a Inter-Collegiate title.

In 1950, he would set the record for fastest time in the 1,500 meters freestyle. Three years later, Sailani would go on to break his record by five seconds. In 1952, he competed in the 1952 Summer Olympics.

In 1994, Basanung was inducted into Letran's Sports Hall of Fame.
