= Takashi Ishimoto =

Japanese swimmer (1935–2009)

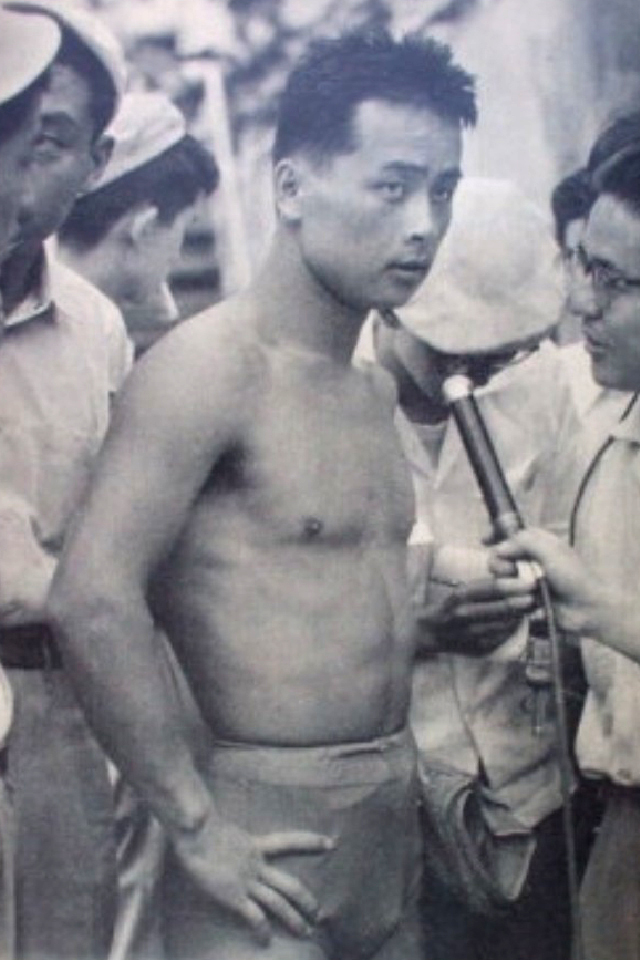
- Ishimoto in 1957

Personal information
- Born: April 6, 1935 (age 91) Aki, Kōchi, Japan

Sport
- Sport: Swimming
Medal record
Representing Japan
Olympic Games
Silver medal – second place	1956 Melbourne	200 m butterfly
Asian Games
Gold medal – first place	1958 Tokyo	100 m butterfly
Gold medal – first place	1958 Tokyo	200 m butterfly
Gold medal – first place	1958 Tokyo	4x100 m medley

Takashi Ishimoto (石本隆, Ishimoto Takashi; born April 6, 1935) is a retired butterfly swimmer from Japan. He won the silver medal in the men's 200 m butterfly at the 1956 Summer Olympics in Melbourne, Australia.

Ishimoto set 16 world records between 1958 and 1959. He won the 100m and 200m butterfly events at the 1959 U.S. International Swimming Championships, and in the 1950s received the Japan Sports Award, Mainichi Sports Award and Asahi Sports Award (twice, in 1955 and 1957). In 1985 he opened his own swimming pool in Kurihama, Yokosuka, Japan.

Records
Preceded by (Hungary) György Tumpek	Men's 100 metre butterfly world record holder (long course); June 16, 1957 – June 26, 1960	Succeeded by (United States) Lance Larson
