= Norihiko Kurahashi =

Japanese swimmer (born 1932)

Personal information
- Born: 1 October 1932 (age 93)

Sport
- Sport: Swimming
Medal record
Men's swimming
Representing Japan
Asian Games
Silver medal – second place	1954 Manila	100 m backstroke

Norihiko Kurahashi (倉橋 範彦, Kurahashi Norihiko; born 1 October 1932) is a Japanese former swimmer. He competed in the men's 100 metre backstroke at the 1952 Summer Olympics.
