= Shah Ghazi =

Pakistani swimmer

Personal information
- Born: 1934 (age 91–92)

Sport
- Sport: Swimming

Shah Ghazi (born 1934) is a Pakistani former swimmer. He competed in the men's 200 metre butterfly at the 1956 Summer Olympics.
