= Swimming at the 1956 Summer Olympics – Men's 200 metre butterfly =

Men's 200 metre butterfly at the Games of the XVI Olympiad
- Venue: Melbourne Sports and Entertainment Centre
- Dates: 30 November 1956 (heats); 1 December 1956 (final)
- Competitors: 19 from 14 nations
- Winning time: 2:19.3

Medalists
1st place, gold medalist(s)		William Yorzyk; United States
2nd place, silver medalist(s)		Takashi Ishimoto; Japan
3rd place, bronze medalist(s)		György Tumpek; Hungary

The men's 200 metre butterfly event at the 1956 Summer Olympics took place on 30 November and 1 December in the Olympic Park Swimming and Diving Stadium in Melbourne, Australia. This swimming event used the butterfly stroke. Because an Olympic-size swimming pool is 50 metres long, this race consisted of four lengths of the pool. This was the first time that the butterfly stroke had appeared in the Olympic Games as a separate event, following its introduction as a superior variant of breaststroke in the 1936 Olympics Men's 200 metre Breaststroke and subsequent dominance in the 200 metre breaststroke events at the 1948 Summer Olympics and 1952 Summer Olympics.

The winning margin was 4.5 seconds which as of 2023 remains the only time this event for men has been won by more than three seconds at the Olympics.

== Results ==
=== Heats ===
Three heats were held. The swimmers with the eight fastest times advanced to the Finals. The swimmers that advanced are highlighted.

==== Heat One ====
Rank	Athlete	Country	Time
1	Bill Yorzyk	United States	2:18.6
2	John Marshall	Australia	2:26.8
3	Alexandru Popescu	Romania	2:29.9
4	René Pirolley	France	2:30.1
5	Jenő Áts	Hungary	2:31.1
6	Walter Ocampo	Mexico	2:41.4

==== Heat Two ====
Rank	Athlete	Country	Time
1	Takashi Ishimoto	Japan	2:24.2
2	Brian Wilkinson	Australia	2:27.2
3	Eulalio Ríos	Mexico	2:28.1
4	Jack Nelson	United States	2:29.4
5	Palsons Naibula	Philippines	3:03.2
6	Shamsher Khan	India	3:06.3

==== Heat Three ====
Rank	Athlete	Country	Time
1	György Tumpek	Hungary	2:23.3
2	Horst Weber	Germany	2:34.4
3	Graham Symonds	Great Britain	2:35.7
4	Agapito Lozada	Philippines	2:43.5
5	George Park	Canada	2:47.2
6	Shah Ghazi	Pakistan	2:48.0
7	Fong Seow Hor	Malaya	2:56.0

=== Final ===
Rank	Athlete	Country	Time	Notes
1	William Yorzyk	United States	2:19.3	
2	Takashi Ishimoto	Japan	2:23.8	
3	György Tumpek	Hungary	2:23.9	
4	Jack Nelson	United States	2:26.6	
5	John Marshall	Australia	2:27.2	
6	Eulalio Ríos Alemán	Mexico	2:27.3	
7	Brian Wilkinson	Australia	2:29.7	
8	Alexandru Popescu	Romania	2:31.0	
