= Habib Nasution =

Indonesian swimmer

Personal information
- Born: 13 November 1936 (age 89) Medan, Indonesia

Sport
- Sport: Swimming
Medal record
Men's swimming
Representing Indonesia
Asian Games
| Bronze medal – third place | 1958 Tokyo | 200 m freestyle |
| Bronze medal – third place | 1958 Tokyo | 4×100 m medley |

Habib Nasution (born 13 November 1936) is an Indonesian former swimmer. He competed in two events at the 1956 Summer Olympics.
