= Shooting at the 1958 Asian Games =

- Venue: Nagasaka & Tomioka Rifle Range; Murayama Shooting Range
- Dates: 25–30 May 1958

Shooting sports at the 1958 Asian Games were held in Nagasaka & Tomioka Rifle Ranges and Murayama Shooting Range Tokyo, Japan between the 25th and 30th of May in 1958. Shooting comprised 6 events, all open to both men and women. There were two pistol events, three rifle events and trap as a shotgun event in the program.

The host nation Japan won five out of six possible gold medals. Adolfo Feliciano from the Philippines won the remaining gold medal in the 300m rifle event.

== Medalists ==
Event	Gold	Silver	Bronze
25 m rapid fire pistol	Choji Hosaka; Japan	Martin Gison; Philippines	Kamol Tandbachoon; Thailand
50 m pistol	Kazuo Takagi; Japan	Amorn Yuktanandana; Thailand	Wang Chih-shan; Republic of China
50 m rifle prone	Yukio Inokuma; Japan	Cesar Jayme; Philippines	Henry Souza; Hong Kong
50 m rifle 3 positions	Kiyoshi Shimoda; Japan	Wu Tao-yuan; Republic of China	Adolfo Feliciano; Philippines
300 m rifle 3 positions	Adolfo Feliciano; Philippines	Wu Tao-yuan; Republic of China	Tomokazu Maruyama; Japan
Trap	Ujitoshi Konomi; Japan	Tsai Pai-sheng; Republic of China	Enrique Beech; Philippines

== Medal table ==
Rank	Nation	Gold	Silver	Bronze	Total
1	Japan (JPN)	5	0	1	6
2	Philippines (PHI)	1	2	2	5
3	Republic of China (ROC)	0	3	1	4
4	Thailand (THA)	0	1	1	2
5	Hong Kong (HKG)	0	0	1	1
Totals (5 entries)		6	6	6	18
