= Swimming at the 1954 Asian Games =

- Dates: 5–8 May 1954

Swimming was contested at the 1954 Asian Games in Manila, Philippine from May 5 to May 8, 1954.

== Medalists ==
=== Men ===
Event	Gold		Silver		Bronze	
100 m freestyle	Hiroshi Suzuki; Japan	58.2; GR	Teijiro Tanikawa; Japan	58.4	Neo Chwee Kok; Singapore	58.6
400 m freestyle	Yoshihiro Shoji; Japan	4:43.3; GR	Katsuji Yamashita; Japan	4:47.2	Bana Sailani; Philippines	4:48.8
1500 m freestyle	Yukiyoshi Aoki; Japan	19:13.0; GR	Shichiro Shintaku; Japan	19:13.9	Tsutomu Nagashima; Japan	19:48.5
100 m backstroke	Keiji Hase; Japan	1:07.1; GR	Norihiko Kurahashi; Japan	1:09.0	Takuro Ashida; Japan	1:09.7
200 m breaststroke	Mamoru Tanaka; Japan	2:41.9; GR	Masaru Furukawa; Japan	2:42.2	Masao Togami; Japan	2:48.1
200 m butterfly	Parsons Nabiula; Philippines	2:48.3; GR	Amado Jimenez; Philippines	2:49.1	Robert Collins; Philippines	3:00.6
4 × 200 m freestyle relay	Japan; Kenzo Yoshimura; Teijiro Tanikawa; Yukiyoshi Aoki; Hiroshi Suzuki	9:08.9; GR	Singapore; Ong Choon Lim; Tan Teow Choon; Lionel Chee; Neo Chwee Kok	9:22.0	Philippines; Rolando Santos; Bertulfo Cachero; Angel Colmenares; Bana Sailani	9:27.2

=== Women ===
Event	Gold		Silver		Bronze	
100 m freestyle	Haydee Coloso; Philippines	1:09.7	Tomiko Atarashi; Japan	1:10.4	Shizue Miyabe; Japan	1:10.5
400 m freestyle	Misako Tamura; Japan	5:32.2; GR	Akiko Miyazaki; Japan	5:39.4	Yoshiko Sato; Japan	5:43.9
100 m backstroke	Jocelyn von Giese; Philippines	1:21.6	Keiko Sadamori; Japan	1:22.1	Midori Morimae; Japan	1:23.3
200 m breaststroke	Masayo Aoki; Japan	3:03.6; GR	Kazuko Sakamoto; Japan	3:08.5	Chizuko Urahata; Japan	3:09.9
100 m butterfly	Haydee Coloso; Philippines	1:28.3; GR	Norma Yldefonso; Philippines	1:36.5	Sandra von Giese; Philippines	1:37.5
4 × 100 m freestyle relay	Japan; Sadako Yamashita; Shizue Miyabe; Misako Tamura; Tomiko Atarashi	4:49.6; GR	Philippines; Sonia von Giese; Gertrudes Vito; Nimfa Lim; Haydee Coloso	5:15.6	Republic of China; Kwok Ngan-hung; Tsui Shiu-ling; Chang Zoe-chee; Chan Sin-yi	5:42.2

== Medal table ==
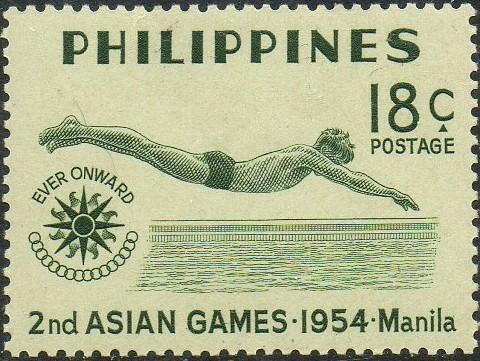
Swimming at the 1954 Asian Games on a stamp of the Philippines

Rank	Nation	Gold	Silver	Bronze	Total
1	Japan (JPN)	9	9	7	25
2	Philippines (PHI)	4	3	4	11
3	Singapore (SIN)	0	1	1	2
4	Republic of China (ROC)	0	0	1	1
Totals (4 entries)		13	13	13	39
