= Swimming at the 1958 Asian Games =

- Venue: Metropolitan Indoor Swimming Pool
- Dates: 28–31 May 1958

Swimming was contested at the 1958 Asian Games in Metropolitan Indoor Swimming Pool, Tokyo, Japan from 28 to 31 May 1958.

== Medalists ==
=== Men ===
Event	Gold		Silver		Bronze	
100 m freestyle	Manabu Koga; Japan	58.3	Kao Chia-hung; Republic of China	58.8	Shintaro Yokochi; Japan	59.1
200 m freestyle	Makoto Fukui; Japan	2:08.2; GR	Tatsuo Fujimoto; Japan	2:08.3	Habib Nasution; Indonesia	2:11.7
400 m freestyle	Tsuyoshi Yamanaka; Japan	4:23.9; WR	Nagatoshi Maruyama; Japan	4:36.1	Bana Sailani; Philippines	4:40.9
1500 m freestyle	Tsuyoshi Yamanaka; Japan	18:00.3; GR	Hiroshi Ishii; Japan	18:28.8	Bana Sailani; Philippines	18.45.9
100 m backstroke	Keiji Hase; Japan	1:05.6; GR	Hideo Ninomiya; Japan	1:07.4	Rodolfo Agustin; Philippines	1:09.5
200 m backstroke	Kazuo Tomita; Japan	2:22.3; GR	Kazuo Watanabe; Japan	2:26.8	Lorenzo Cortez; Philippines	2:32.6
100 m breaststroke	Masaru Ota; Japan	1:14.8; GR	Akio Sugiyama; Japan	1:16.8	Li Che-sheng; Republic of China	1:17.1
200 m breaststroke	Masaru Furukawa; Japan	2:44.0	Hsu Hsing-tai; Republic of China	2:47.3	Hajime Waki; Japan	2:47.9
100 m butterfly	Takashi Ishimoto; Japan	1:01.4; GR	Fumiaki Masunaga; Japan	1:02.0	Walter Brown; Philippines	1:06.9
200 m butterfly	Takashi Ishimoto; Japan	2:21.4; GR	Koichi Hirakida; Japan	2:24.2	Freddie Elizalde; Philippines	2:47.7
4 × 200 m freestyle relay	Japan; Tsuyoshi Yamanaka; Makoto Fukui; Tatsuo Fujimoto; Toshizo Umemoto	8:29.5; GR	Philippines; Agapito Lozada; Ulpiano Babol; Bana Sailani; Dakula Arabani	9:06.7	Republic of China; Lin Min-shan; Sun Ke-chun; Li Che-sheng; Kao Chia-hung	9:39.0
4 × 100 m medley relay	Japan; Keiji Hase; Masaru Furukawa; Takashi Ishimoto; Manabu Koga	4:17.2; WR	Philippines; Rodolfo Agustin; Jacinto Cayco; Freddie Elizalde; Dakula Arabani	4:37.7	Indonesia; Tio Tjoe Hong; Abdul Rasjid; Lie Tjoan Kiet; Habib Nasution	4:48.0

=== Women ===
Event	Gold		Silver		Bronze	
100 m freestyle	Yoshiko Sato; Japan	1:06.0; GR	Haydee Coloso-Espino; Philippines	1:06.4	Hitomi Jinno; Japan	1:06.7
200 m freestyle	Yoshiko Sato; Japan	2:26.9; GR	Haydee Coloso-Espino; Philippines	2:32.2	Ryoko Omiya; Japan	2:36.5
400 m freestyle	Emiko Shibahara; Japan	5:15.8; GR	Gertrudes Lozada; Philippines	5:16.3	Eiko Wada; Japan	5:30.6
100 m backstroke	Satoko Tanaka; Japan	1:15.3; GR	Setsuko Okamoto; Japan	1:19.3	Sylvia von Giese; Philippines	1:20.0
100 m breaststroke	Yoshiko Takamatsu; Japan	1:24.1; GR	Masayo Aoki; Japan	1:27.7	Ria Tobing; Indonesia	1:28.3
200 m breaststroke	Yoshiko Takamatsu; Japan	2:55.6; GR	Noriko Odagiri; Japan	3:02.6	Victoria Cagayat; Philippines	3:09.3
100 m butterfly	Shizue Miyabe; Japan	1:13.1; GR	Sandra von Giese; Philippines	1:17.9	Tatsuyo Teragaito; Japan	1:19.6
4 × 100 m freestyle relay	Japan; Yoshiko Sato; Setsuko Shimada; Shigeyo Nakaoki; Hitomi Jinno	4:27.3; GR	Philippines; Victoria Cullen; Corazon Lozada; Gertrudes Lozada; Haydee Coloso-Espino	4:50.4	Republic of China; Wang Song-yu; Fung Ying-chu; Leung Chiu-bing; Ou Yuen-ling	5:31.5
4 × 100 m medley relay	Philippines; Jocelyn von Giese; Victoria Cagayat; Sandra von Giese; Haydee Coloso-Espino	5:22.2; GR	Republic of China; Fung Ying-chu; Chang Zoe-chee; Leung Chiu-bing; Ou Yuen-ling	5:50.7	None awarded	

== Medal table ==
Rank	Nation	Gold	Silver	Bronze	Total
1	Japan (JPN)	20	11	6	37
2	Philippines (PHI)	1	7	8	16
3	Republic of China (ROC)	0	3	3	6
4	Indonesia (INA)	0	0	3	3
Totals (4 entries)		21	21	20	62
