= Tsuyoshi Yamanaka =

Japanese swimmer (1939–2017)

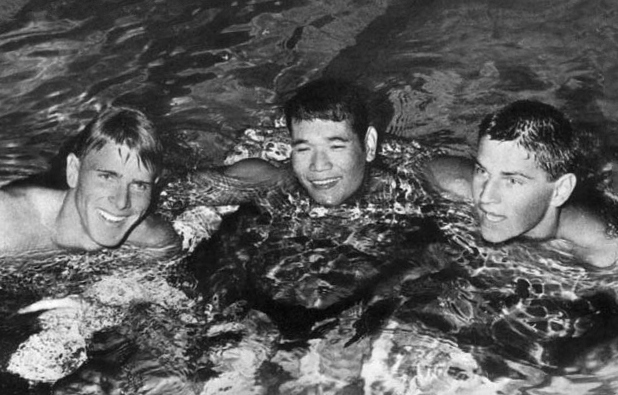
- Yamanaka (center) at the 1960 Olympics

Personal information
- Born: 18 January 1939 Wajima, Ishikawa, Empire of Japan
- Died: 10 February 2017 (aged 78) Tokyo, Japan
- Height: 171 cm (5 ft 7 in)
- Weight: 75 kg (165 lb)

Sport
- Sport: Swimming
Medal record
Representing Japan
Olympic Games
Silver medal – second place	1956 Melbourne	400 m freestyle
Silver medal – second place	1956 Melbourne	1500 m freestyle
Silver medal – second place	1960 Rome	400 m freestyle
Silver medal – second place	1960 Rome	4×200 m freestyle relay
Asian Games
Gold medal – first place	1958 Tokyo	400 m freestyle
Gold medal – first place	1958 Tokyo	1500 m freestyle

Tsuyoshi Yamanaka (山中 毅, Yamanaka Tsuyoshi; 18 January 1939 – 10 February 2017) was a Japanese freestyle swimmer. He competed in the 400 m, 1500 m and 4 × 200 m events at the 1956, 1960 and 1964 Olympics and won four silver medals; he also helped Japan win a bronze relay medal in 1964 by swimming in the heat, and placed fourth in the 4 × 200 m relay in 1956 and in the 1500m in 1960. At the 1960 Olympics, he swam the fastest leg in the 4 × 200 m relay, yet his team lost to the United States. Yamanaka won the 400 m and 1500 m events at the 1958 Asian Games.

Yamanaka studied in college at the University of Southern California, where he broke the 200 m world record three times within two months in 1961. He set two more records over 200 m earlier in 1958–59, but this distance was not an Olympic event in those years. Yamanaka also set a world record over 400 m in 1959 and three world records in the 4 × 200 m relay in 1959 and 1963. Yamanaka graduated from Waseda University and later headed the Itoman Swimming School in Osaka. In 1983 he was inducted into the International Swimming Hall of Fame. In 1995, he unsuccessfully ran for the House of Councillors.

Yamanaka's coach used pebbles to communicate with him during the training sessions – whenever Yamanaka would relax the coach would throw a pebble in his back. After the training Yamanaka had to collect the pebbles from the pool bottom.

Yamanaka died from pneumonia on 10 February 2017 in Tokyo, at the age of 78.

== See also ==
- List of members of the International Swimming Hall of Fame
