= Alexandru Popescu =

Romanian swimmer

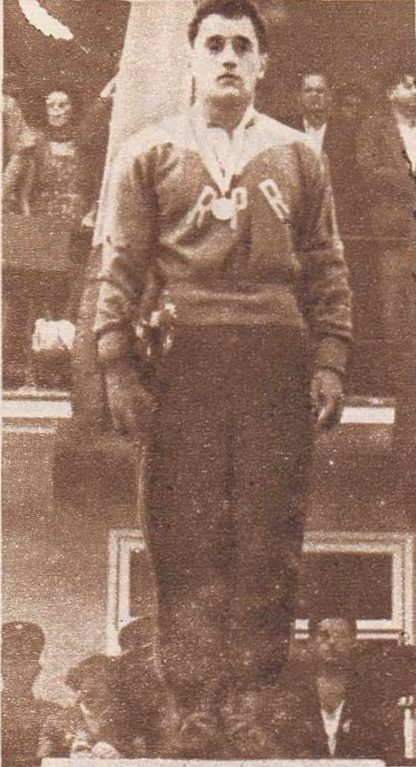

Personal information
- Born: 12 October 1935 (age 90) Bucharest, Romania

Sport
- Sport: Swimming

Alexandru Popescu (born 12 October 1935) is a Romanian former butterfly swimmer. He competed at the 1956 Summer Olympics and the 1960 Summer Olympics.
