= György Tumpek =

Hungarian swimmer (1929–2022)

Medal record

Men's swimming

Representing Hungary

Olympic Games
Bronze medal – third place	1956 Melbourne	200 m butterfly

European Championships
Gold medal – first place	1954 Turin	200 m butterfly
Silver medal – second place	1958 Budapest	4x100 m medley

György Tumpek (12 January 1929 – 21 December 2022) was a Hungarian swimmer and Olympic medalist. He was born in Budapest. He participated at the 1956 Summer Olympics, winning a bronze medal in 200 metre butterfly.
