= Shizue Miyabe =

Japanese swimmer (born 1938)

Personal information
- Born: 3 August 1938 (age 87) Nara, Nara, Japan

Sport
- Sport: Swimming
- Strokes: Butterfly, freestyle
Medal record
Women's swimming
Representing Japan
Asian Games
Gold medal – first place	1954 Manila	4×100 m freestyle
Gold medal – first place	1958 Tokyo	100 m butterfly
Bronze medal – third place	1954 Manila	100 m freestyle

Shizue Miyabe (宮部 シズエ, Miyabe Shizue; born 3 August 1938) is a Japanese former swimmer. She competed at the 1952 Summer Olympics and the 1960 Summer Olympics.
