= Hitomi Jinno =

Japanese swimmer (born 1937)

Personal information
- Born: 8 March 1937 (age 89) Aichi, Japan

Sport
- Sport: Swimming
- Strokes: Freestyle
Medal record
Women's swimming
Representing Japan
Asian Games
Gold medal – first place	1958 Tokyo	4×100 m freestyle
Bronze medal – third place	1958 Tokyo	100 m freestyle

Hitomi Jinno (神野 眸, Jinno Hitomi; born 8 March 1937) is a Japanese former freestyle swimmer. She competed at the 1956 Summer Olympics and the 1960 Summer Olympics.
