= Keiji Hase =

Japanese swimmer (born 1935)

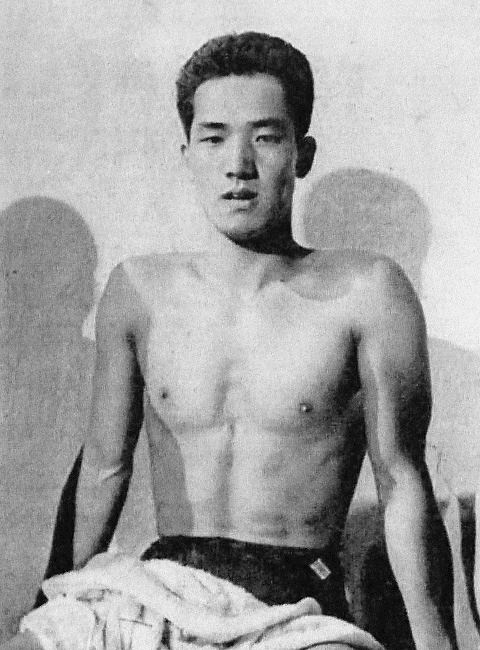
- Hase in 1956

Personal information
- Born: July 3, 1935 (age 90)

Sport
- Sport: Swimming
Medal record
Representing Japan
Asian Games
Gold medal – first place	1954 Manila	100m backstroke
Gold medal – first place	1958 Tokyo	100m backstroke

Keiji Hase (長谷 景治, Hase Keiji; born 3 July 1935) is a Japanese former backstroke swimmer who competed in the 1956 Summer Olympics.
