= Manabu Koga =

Japanese swimmer (1935–1974)

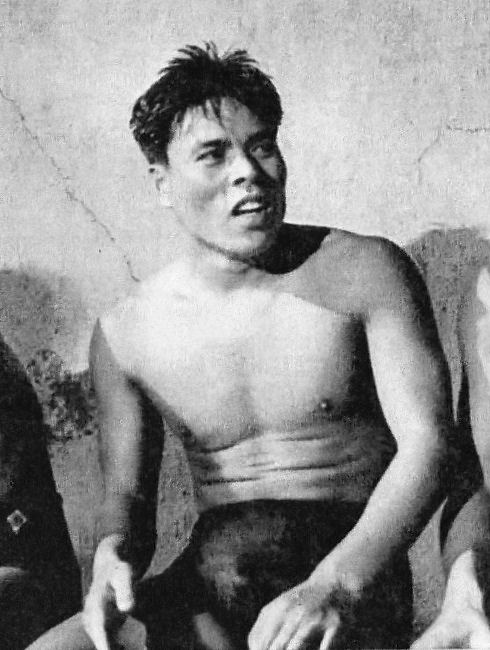
- Koga in 1956

Personal information
- Full name: Manabu Koga
- National team: Japan
- Born: April 5, 1935
- Died: May 18, 1974 (aged 39)

Sport
- Country: Japan
- Sport: Swimming
Medal record
Men's swimming
Representing Japan
Asian Games
Gold medal – first place	1958 Tokyo	100 m freestyle
Gold medal – first place	1958 Tokyo	4×100 m medley
- Updated on 11 October 2021

Manabu Koga (5 April 1935 – 18 May 1974) was a Japanese freestyle swimmer who competed in the 1956 Summer Olympics.
