= Antonio Saloso =

Filipino swimmer

Personal information
- Nationality: Filipino
- Born: 4 September 1940 Siasi, Philippines
- Died: 13 August 2011 (aged 70) Paranaque Philippines

Sport
- Sport: Swimming
- Strokes: Breaststroke
Medal record
Representing Philippines
Asian Games
Silver medal – second place	1962 Jakarta	4x100m medley relay

Antonio Saloso (4 September 1940 – 13 August 2011) was a Filipino swimmer. He competed in two events at the 1960 Summer Olympics.
