= Parsons Nabiula =

Filipino swimmer

Personal information
- Full name: Parsons Charles Nabiula
- Nationality: Filipino
- Born: 2 January 1930 Sulu, Commonwealth of the Philippines
- Died: 19 February 2005 (aged 75) Philippines

Sport
- Sport: Swimming
- Strokes: Breaststroke, Butterfly
Medal record
Men's swimming
Representing Philippines
Asian Games
Gold medal – first place	1954 Manila	200 m butterfly

Parsons Nabiula (January 2, 1930 – February 19, 2005) was a Filipino swimmer and Constabulary officer from Sulu. He competed in two events at the 1956 Summer Olympics. He is the father of actor Sonny Parsons.

== Career ==
In his early years, Nabiula competed in the Manila-based Private Schools Athletic Association.

Nabiula competed in two swimming events at the 1956 Summer Olympics in Melbourne, Australia representing the Philippines. Nabiula failed to advance from the first round of the men's 200 meter breaststroke after he and Brazilian swimmer, Octávio Mobiglia, were disqualified. They competed in Heat 1, which was contested by seven swimmers.

In the men's 200 meter butterfly event, Nabiula competed in Heat 2 and finished fifth among six swimmers by clocking 3 mins and 3.2 seconds. He only bested Shamsher Khan of India. He failed to progress to the final round by failing to finish among the top eight swimmers of the first round.

In 1993, Nabiula starred as "Sonny Parsons Sr." in the film Capt. Rassul Alih, Hindi Sayo ang Mindanao, directed by his son Sonny Parsons who also stars in the lead role.
