= Cristobal Ramas =

Filipino basketball player

Personal information
- Born: February 15, 1935 Cebu City, Cebu, Philippine Islands
- Died: August 2014 (aged 79) California, U.S.
- Listed height: 6 ft 3 in (190 cm)
- Listed weight: 170 lb (77 kg)

Career information
- College: UV; UST

Career history
- 1960: 7-Up Marauders
- 1960–1963: Ysmael Steel Admirals
- 1963–1965: Crispa Redmanizers
Medals
Men's basketball
Representing Philippines
Asian Games
Gold medal – first place	1962 Jakarta	Team

Cristobal Ramas (February 15, 1935 – August 2014) was a Filipino former basketball player who competed in the 1960 Summer Olympics.

Aside from the 1960 Rome Olympics, Ramas also saw action in the 1962 Asian Games in Jakarta. He was a product of the University of the Visayas in Cebu City.

After playing for UV in the Cebu Collegiate Athletic Association, he took up commerce at University of Santo Tomas and played with the Glowing Goldies in the UAAP tournament from 1957 to 1959 and then went back to Cebu and got his commerce degree at Colegio de San Jose.

Ramas' height and bulk impressed Lauro Mumar who took him to play for the Seven-Up Marauders in 1960. He played for Seven-Up for only seven months after which he transferred to MICAA champion Ysmael Steel. He was with the Admirals for four years. Crispa recruited Ramas in 1963 and he was with the Redmanizers until 1965 before he stopped playing upon being employed at the Philippine National Bank.
