= Francisca Sañopal =

Filipino hurdler (born 1931)

Personal information
- Nationality: Filipino
- Born: 1931
- Died: unknown

Sport
- Sport: Track and field
- Event: 80 metres hurdles
Medal record
Women's Athletics
Representing Philippines
Asian Games
Silver medal – second place	1958 Tokyo	80m hurdles

Francisca S. Sañopal (born 1931, date of death unknown) was a Filipino hurdler. She competed in the women's 80 metres hurdles at the 1956 Summer Olympics. Sanopal is deceased.
