= Geronimo Cruz =

Filipino basketball player

Personal information
- Born: December 12, 1937 Guagua, Pampanga, Philippine Commonwealth
- Died: August 21, 2022 (aged 84) Manila, Philippines
- Listed height: 6 ft 1 in (185 cm)
- Listed weight: 170 lb (77 kg)
Medals
Men's basketball
Representing Philippines
Asian Games
Gold medal – first place	1962 Jakarta	Team

Geronimo Cruz (December 12, 1937 – August 21, 2022) was a Filipino basketball player who competed in the 1960 Summer Olympics.

== Basketball career ==
The four-time national player often called "Gerry" owned the distinction of being the only Filipino basketball star recruited to play abroad. In 1959, Cruz was drafted to play for the University of San Francisco Dons and he did have a short stint until he was recalled to Manila by his employer Baby Ysmael.

Gerry saw action in one Olympics (Rome, 1960), one world championship (Santiago, Chile, 1959), one Asian Games (Jakarta, 1962), and one Asian Basketball Confederation (Taipei, 1963). Cruz played for the FEU Tamaraws in his rookie year in 1956 and his heroics in the championship match against UST gave the Tams the UAAP varsity crown.

He was an original member of the famed Ysmael Steel Admirals which Baby Ysmael formed in October 1956. His teammates were Frankie Rabat, Tito Villareal, Tine Literal, Cesar Jota, Serafin Vida, Pablo Belmonte, Apolinar Rosar, Conrado Santos and Carlos Badion.

Cruz retired in 1964 after he reinjured his knee which he suffered in the Admirals game against Crispa where he fell to the floor during an undergoal play and broke his knee.
