= Amir Hussin Hamsain =

Filipino swimmer (born 1942)

Personal information
- Born: 8 July 1942 (age 83) Maimbung, Sulu, Philippines

Sport
- Sport: Swimming
Medal record
Representing Philippines
Asian Games
Silver medal – second place	1962 Jakarta	4x100m medley relay
Bronze medal – third place	1962 Jakarta	100m butterfly
Bronze medal – third place	1962 Jakarta	200m butterfly

Amir Hussin Hamsain (born 8 July 1942) is a Filipino former swimmer. He competed in the men's 200 metre butterfly at the 1960 Summer Olympics.
