= Constancio Ortiz =

Filipino basketball player

Personal information
- Born: January 19, 1937 (age 89)
- Listed height: 5 ft 11 in (180 cm)
- Listed weight: 172 lb (78 kg)
Medals
Men's basketball
Representing Philippines
ABC Championship
Gold medal – first place	1960 Manila	Team
Asian Games
Gold medal – first place	1958 Tokyo	Team

Constancio Ortiz Jr. (born January 19, 1937) is a Filipino former basketball player who competed in the 1960 Summer Olympics.
