= Leonardo Marquicias =

Filipino basketball player

Personal information
- Born: November 6, 1930 Tondo, Manila, Philippine Islands
- Died: September 11, 2002 (aged 71)
Medals
Men's basketball
Representing Philippines
Asian Games
Gold medal – first place	1958 Tokyo	Team

Leonardo "Nards" Marquicias (November 6, 1930 – September 11, 2002) was a Filipino basketball player who competed in the 1956 Summer Olympics. He is the son of Franco Marquicias.
