= Lorenzo Cortez =

Filipino swimmer (born 1939)

Personal information
- Born: September 12, 1939 (age 87) Manila, Philippines
- Died: May 4, 2014 (aged 74) Parañaque City, Metro Manila

Sport
- Sport: Swimming
Medal record
Representing Philippines
Asian Games
| Bronze medal – third place | 1958 Tokyo | 200m backstroke |

Lorenzo Cortez (born 12 September 1939) was a Filipino swimmer. He competed in two events at the 1960 Summer Olympics.
