= Hernando Castelo =

Filipino sports shooter (1906–1966)

Personal information
- Born: 23 August 1906 Cabanatuan, Philippine Islands
- Died: 20 March 1966 (aged 59)

Sport
- Country: Philippines
- Sport: Sports shooting
Medal record
Men's shooting
Representing Philippines
Asian Games
Gold medal – first place	1954 Manila	300 m rifle 3 positions

Hernando Castelo (23 August 1906 – 20 March 1966) was a Filipino sports shooter. He competed at the 1956 Summer Olympics and the 1960 Summer Olympics, 1954 Asian Games and 1962 Asian Games.
