= Emilio Achacoso =

Filipino basketball player

Personal information
- Born: May 17, 1932 (age 94)
- Listed height: 5 ft 10 in (178 cm)
- Listed weight: 172 lb (78 kg)

Career information
- College: Mapúa

Career history
- Republic Supermarket Greyhounds
- 1956: Philippine Airlines
- 1958–1961: YCO Painters
Medals
Men's basketball
Representing Philippines
ABC Championship
Gold medal – first place	1960 Manila	Team
Asian Games
Gold medal – first place	1958 Tokyo	Team

Emilio Achacoso (born May 17, 1932) is a Filipino former basketball player who competed in the 1960 Summer Olympics.

== Basketball career ==
Jun Achacoso was tops in his senior year at Mapua in 1954. He was named alternate in the 1954 Asian Games held in Manila but he was allowed to play a few games. His showing in the NCAA made coach Herr Silva field Jun in some games during the tournament. Right after he got his degree in Business Administration, he worked at the Development Bank and played with the Republic Supermarket Greyhounds in the MICAA.

After an indefinite suspension from the PAAF for accepting to play for the Chinese Black and White team in an Asian tour without permission was lifted in 1956, Jun went to play for the Philippine Air Lines in the MICAA. He failed to make it in the 1956 Melbourne Olympics. In 1958, Jun played for YCO Painters and made a good showing, this gave him the berth in the third Asian Games in Tokyo in the same year.

The next three years were memorable for Jun. He was a member of the 1959 RP team that saw action in the Chile world amateur championships. The following year, he made the Rome Olympics and the first Asian Basketball Confederation meet held in Manila.

In 1961, Jun retired for good when YCO was dethrone by Ysmael Steel as national champion.
