= Agapito Lozada =

Filipino swimmer

Personal information
- Nationality: Filipino
- Born: 1938 Parañaque, Rizal, Philippine Commonwealth
- Died: 29 July 2011

Sport
- Sport: Swimming
Medal record
Representing Philippines
Asian Games
Silver medal – second place	1958 Tokyo	4x200m freestyle relay

Agapito Lozada (1938 – 29 July 2011) was a Filipino swimmer. He competed at the 1956 Summer Olympics. He competed in the Men's 4 × 200 metres Freestyle Relay and Men's 200 metres Butterfly; however, he did not making it past the heats.
