= Martin Urra =

Filipino basketball player

Personal information
- Born: February 8, 1931 Cadiz, Negros Occidental, Philippine Commonwealth
- Died: September 11, 2002 (aged 71) Pasay, Philippines
- Listed height: 6 ft 1 in (185 cm)
- Listed weight: 183 lb (83 kg)
Medals
Men's basketball
Representing Philippines
Asian Games
Gold medal – first place	1958 Tokyo	Team

Martin Urra (February 8, 1931 – September 11, 2002) was a Filipino basketball player who competed in the 1956 Summer Olympics.

He died in Pasay, Philippines.
