= Antonio Villamor =

Filipino basketball player (born 1931)

Personal information
- Born: August 8, 1931 Manila, Philippine Islands
- Listed height: 5 ft 10 in (179 cm)
- Listed weight: 180 lb (80 kg)

Career information
- College: NU
Medals
Men's basketball
Representing Philippines
Asian Games
Gold medal – first place	1958 Tokyo	Team

Antonio Villamor (born August 8, 1931) is a Filipino former basketball player who competed in the 1956 Summer Olympics. He played for NU Bulldogs in the UAAP, leading the team to their first UAAP Basketball Championship in 1954.
