= Freddie Elizalde =

Filipino swimmer (born 1940)

Personal information
- Born: 17 August 1940 (age 85) Makati, Philippines

Sport
- Sport: Swimming
Medal record
Representing Philippines
Asian Games
Silver medal – second place	1958 Tokyo	4x100m medley relay
Bronze medal – third place	1958 Tokyo	200m butterfly

Freddie Elizalde (born 17 August 1940) is a Filipino former swimmer and businessman. He competed in two events at the 1960 Summer Olympics.
