= Dakula Arabani =

Filipino swimmer (born 1938)

Personal information
- Born: 10 August 1938 Jolo, Sulu, Philippines
- Died: 16 October 2011 (aged 73)

Sport
- Sport: Swimming
Medal record
Representing Philippines
Asian Games
Silver medal – second place	1958 Tokyo	4x200m freestyle relay
Silver medal – second place	1958 Tokyo	4x100m medley relay

Dakula Arabani (10 August 1938 – 16 October 2011) was a Filipino swimmer. He competed in two events at the 1956 Summer Olympics.
