= Adolfo Feliciano =

Filipino sports shooter (1930–1973)

Personal information
- Nationality: Filipino
- Born: 22 June 1930 Manila, Philippine Islands
- Died: 30 January 1973 (aged 42) Lamao, Limay, Philippines

Sport
- Country: Philippines
- Sport: Sports shooting
Medal record
Men's shooting
Representing Philippines
Asian Games
Gold medal – first place	1954 Manila	50 m rifle 3 positions
Gold medal – first place	1958 Tokyo	300 m rifle 3 positions
Silver medal – second place	1962 Jakarta	50 m rifle 3 positions
Silver medal – second place	1966 Bangkok	50 m standard rifle 3 positions
Silver medal – second place	1966 Bangkok	50 m standard rifle 3 positions team
Bronze medal – third place	1958 Tokyo	50 m rifle 3 positions
Bronze medal – third place	1966 Bangkok	50 m rifle prone
Bronze medal – third place	1966 Bangkok	50 m rifle 3 positions
Bronze medal – third place	1966 Bangkok	10 m air rifle team

Adolfo Feliciano (22 June 1930 – 30 January 1973) was a Filipino sports shooter. He competed at the 1960, 1964 and the 1968 Summer Olympics. He also competed in four editions of the Asian Games, from 1954 to 1966.

Feliciano died on 30 January 1973 when the L-20 Beaver plane of the Philippine Navy he was travelling on crashed in Lamao, Limay.
