= Alberto Nogar =

Filipino weightlifter

Alberto T. Nogar Sr
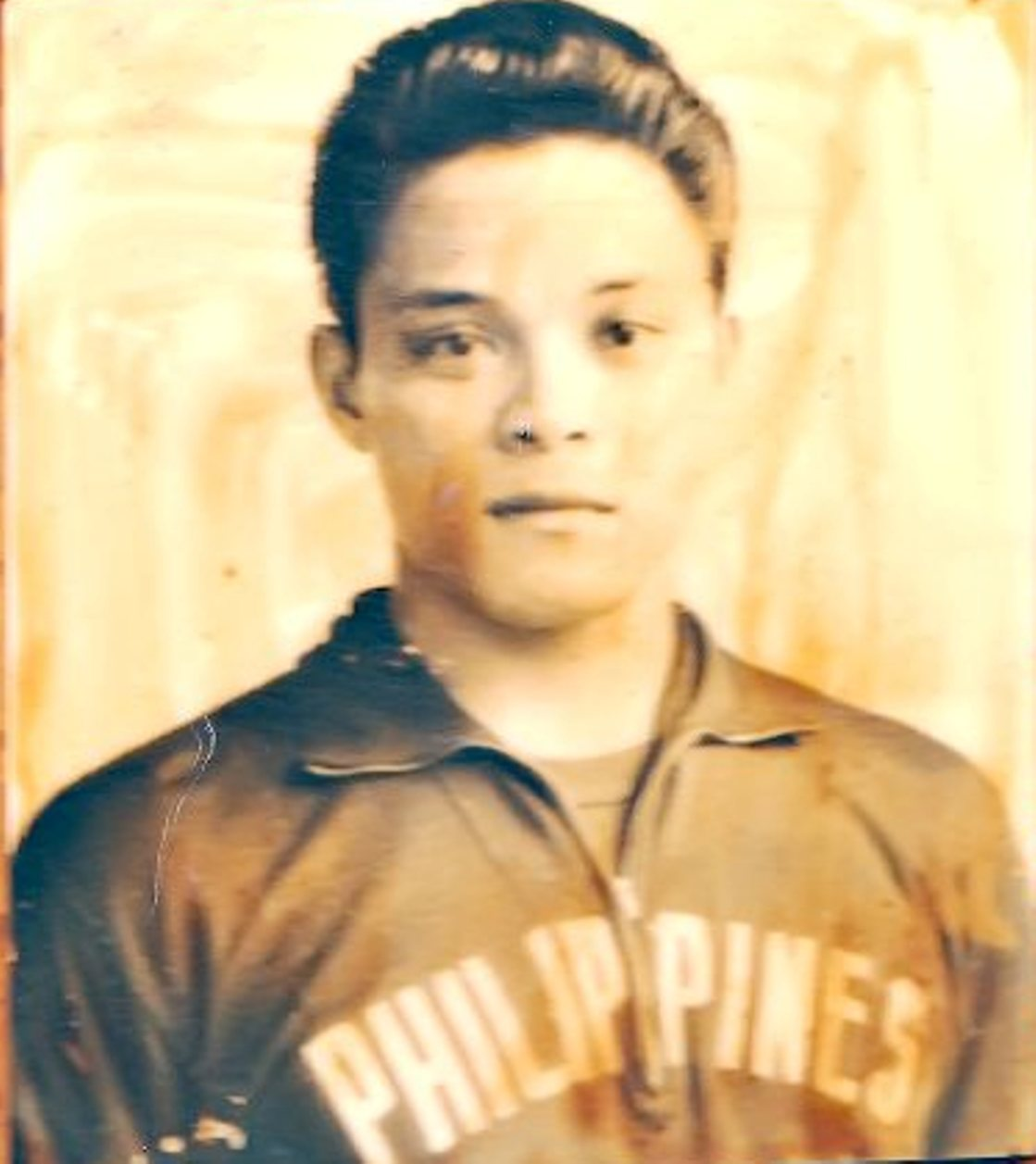
- Philippine Weightlifting Team 1958

Personal information
- Nickname: Bert
- Nationality: Filipino
- Born: May 23, 1934 Zamboanga, Philippine Islands
- Died: February 15, 2013 (aged 78) Manila, Philippines
- Height: 1.60 m (5 ft 3 in)
- Weight: 58 kg (128 lb)

Sport
- Sport: Weightlifting
- Event: 58kg
- College team: Far Eastern University
- Coached by: Elpidio S. Dorotheo
Medal record
Men's weightlifting
Representing Philippines
Asian Games
Bronze medal – third place	1958 Tokyo	56 kg

Alberto T. Nogar Sr (May 23, 1934 – February 15, 2013) was a former Olympic featherweight weightlifter for the Philippines, who competed at the 1960 Summer Olympics in Rome, Italy.

== Biography ==
Alberto was born in Zamboanga City in the Philippines Island of Mindanao, he was the fifth child of a total of twelve siblings born to Fortunata Tubog and Marcelo Nogar. His father served with the US Rangers during the Second World War.

Alberto studied at the Far Eastern University in Manila Philippines where he excelled in sports. He represented the country as a bantamweight in the 1958 3rd Asian Games in Tokyo Japan and received the bronze medal, he was also selected to represent the Philippines in the 1960 XVII Rome Olympiad where he finished 8th overall. Other achievements includes participating in the 1962 4th Asian Games held in Jakarta, Indonesia, 1961 World Championships in Vienna, Austria and he finished in 5th place at the 1958 World Championship in Stockholm, Sweden.

== Weightlifting achievements ==
- 1958 Bronze medallist at the 3rd Asian Games in Tokyo, Japan
- 1958 5th Place at the World Weightlifting Championships in Stockholm, Sweden
- 1960 8th Overall at the XVII Olympiad Games in Rome, Italy
- 1960 Philippine Sportswriters Association Athlete of the year (Weightlifting)

== Death ==
Alberto died of natural causes on February 15, 2013, at The Philippine Heart Centre surrounded by his love ones. He was 78. He is survived by his wife of 50 years, Fely and five offspring (John, Alberto Jr, Hennie, Marcel and Ulla).
