= Cesar Jayme =

Filipino sports shooter (1918–1992)

César Jayme
Personal information
- Nationality: Filipino
- Born: 18 January 1918 Manila, Philippine Islands
- Died: 8 June 1992 (aged 74) San Mateo, California, United States

Sport
- Country: Philippines
- Sport: Sports shooting
Medal record
Men's shooting
Representing Philippines
Asian Games
Silver medal – second place	1954 Manila	50 m rifle prone
Silver medal – second place	1958 Tokyo	50 m rifle prone

César Jayme (18 January 1918 – 8 June 1992) was a Filipino sports shooter. He competed at four Olympic Games.
