= Ulpiano Babol =

Filipino swimmer

Personal information
- Born: 9 April 1936 Cebu City, Philippines
- Died: 12 September 1973 (aged 37) Cebu City, Philippines

Sport
- Sport: Swimming
Medal record
Representing Philippines
Asian Games
Silver medal – second place	1958 Tokyo	4x200m freestyle relay

Ulpiano Amistoso Babol (9 April 1936 – 12 September 1973) was a Filipino swimmer. He competed in two events at the 1956 Summer Olympics.
