= Enrique Beech =

Filipino sportsperson (1920–2012)

- Born: August 14, 1920; Manila, Philippine Islands
- Died: November 14, 2012 (aged 92); Parañaque, Philippines
Association football career
College career
Years	Team	Apps	(Gls)
–1936	San Beda College		
Senior career*
Years	Team	Apps	(Gls)
1940s	Turba Salvaje		
International career
1936–1950	Philippines		
- * Club domestic league appearances and goals
- Sports career
Medal record
Men's shooting
Representing Philippines
Asian Games
Bronze medal – third place	1954 Manila	Trap
Bronze medal – third place	1958 Tokyo	Trap

Enrique Beech (August 14, 1920 – November 14, 2012) was a Philippine footballer and sport shooter.

== Early life and education ==
He was born in Manila and attended Colegio de San Juan de Letran and San Beda College.

== Career ==
Beech played on the football team of San Beda. He was recruited upon his 1936 graduation to play for the Philippines national football team. In the Manila Football League he played for the Turba Salvaje in the late 1940s. He played for the national team until 1950 and stayed with them through 1950, when a knee injury put his career on hold. The Philippine Olympic Committee, then the Philippine Amateur Athletic Federation, helped pay for a knee operation so that he could resume playing, but Beech soon turned to shooting following his recovery, believing that he would have a better chance to medal in this sport at the 1954 Asian Games.

Beech competed in trap shooting throughout his career and won a bronze medal at the 1954 Asian Games. Two years later he headed to the 1956 Summer Olympics, where he placed 24th in a field of 32 participants in the same event. At the 1958 Asian Games he again captured a bronze medal and his last major international tournament was the 1960 Summer Olympics, where he ended up near the bottom of the rankings in the competition. He later found success in golf and was inducted into the San Beda College Sports Hall of Fame in 2003.

Outside of sports he worked in the cargo department of Philippine Airlines and later ran a travel agency. From 1990 until his death he served as a consultant to the Philippine Sports Commission. He died November 14, 2012, in Parañaque.
