= Sandra von Giese =

Filipino swimmer (born 1939)

Personal information
- Born: 15 November 1939 (age 86) Manila, Philippine Commonwealth

Sport
- Sport: Swimming
Medal record
Women's swimming
Representing Philippines
Asian Games
| Gold medal – first place | 1958 Tokyo | 4×100 m medley |
| Silver medal – second place | 1958 Tokyo | 100 m butterfly |
| Bronze medal – third place | 1954 Manila | 100 m butterfly |

Sandra von Giese (born 15 November 1939) is a Filipino former swimmer. She competed in the women's 100 metre butterfly at the 1960 Summer Olympics, where she was eliminated in the heats. She is the sister of Jocelyn von Giese.
