= Jocelyn von Giese =

Filipino swimmer (born 1936)

Personal information
- Born: 19 July 1936 (age 90)

Sport
- Sport: Swimming
Medal record
Women's swimming
Representing Philippines
Asian Games
Gold medal – first place	1954 Manila	100 m backstroke
Gold medal – first place	1958 Tokyo	4×100 m medley

Jocelyn von Giese (born 19 July 1936) is a former swimmer from Filipino. She competed in the women's 100-metre backstroke at the 1956 Summer Olympics. She is the sister of Sandra von Giese.
