= Gertrudes Lozada =

Filipino swimmer (born 1943)

Personal information
- Born: 1943 (age 82–83)

Sport
- Sport: Swimming
Medal record
Women's swimming
Representing Philippines
Asian Games
Silver medal – second place	1958 Tokyo	400 m freestyle
Silver medal – second place	1958 Tokyo	4×100 m freestyle
Silver medal – second place	1962 Jakarta	4×100 m freestyle
Silver medal – second place	1966 Bangkok	4×100 m freestyle
Silver medal – second place	1966 Bangkok	4×100 m medley
Bronze medal – third place	1962 Jakarta	100 m butterfly
Bronze medal – third place	1962 Jakarta	4×100 m medley
Bronze medal – third place	1966 Bangkok	100 m butterfly

Gertrudes "Tuding" Lozada (born 1943) is a Filipino former swimmer. She competed in two events at the 1956 Summer Olympics. She was inducted to the Philippine Sports Hall of Fame in July 2021.
