= Bana Sailani =

Filipino swimmer (1937–2011)

Personal information
- National team: Philippines
- Born: October 21, 1937 Siasi, Sulu, Philippine Commonwealth
- Died: 2011 (aged 73–74)
- Height: 177 cm (5 ft 9 1/2 in)
- Weight: 68 kg (150 lb)

Sport
- Sport: Swimming
- Strokes: Freestyle
Medal record
Men's swimming
Representing the Philippines
Asian Games
Silver medal – second place	1958 Tokyo	4 × 200 m freestyle relay
Bronze medal – third place	1962 Jakarta	4 × 200 m freestyle relay
Bronze medal – third place	1954 Manila	4 × 200 m freestyle relay
Bronze medal – third place	1958 Tokyo	400 m freestyle
Bronze medal – third place	1958 Tokyo	1500 m freestyle
Bronze medal – third place	1954 Manila	400 m freestyle

Bana Sailani (October 21, 1937 – 2011) was a Filipino swimmer and swimming instructor. He competed at the 1956 Summer Olympics and the 1960 Summer Olympics.

== Early life and education ==
Sailani who is of Tausūg and Badjao ethnicity was born in Siasi, Sulu. He started to participate in swimming competitions as early as when he was still an elementary student at the Sisangat Siasi Sulu Elementary School. He attended the University of Santo Tomas for his secondary studies following his stint at the 1956 Summer Olympics but stopped studying before his participation at the 1960 Summer Olympics to help his brother Egging enter the University of the Philippines for Egging's collegiate studies.

== Career ==
=== Competitive ===
He was encouraged by his grade school principal to participate in swimming competitions and Sailani later won first place twice in regional competitions. Former Olympian Sambiao Basanung scouted him when he was on his sixth grade and brought him to Manila in 1949 to train for the 1954 Asian Games.

Sailani's District Supervisor Julio Barnes and Tila Rasul, who is the father of former Senator Santanina Rasul also encouraged Sailani in his swimming career pursuit at a time when he had already earned a reputation in Mindanao as a "star swimmer and record breaker". He also joined the Palarong Pambansa a national-level competition. He won at the 1952 National Games which was hosted in Legaspi, Bicol at age 15.

In 1953, Sailani broke national records. In March of that year, Sailini set a record for the 1,500 meter freestyle race beating the previous national record by five seconds set by his mentor Basanung in the tryouts for the 1950 Summer Olympics. In December 1953, he broke the record for the 400 meter race two times consecutively and became the first Filipino to swim in that distance in less than five minutes. He outbested second-placer Agapito Lozada by almost two meters. Following a vote, he was named as the Athlete of the Year for 1953 by the Philippine Sportswriters Association (PSA).

Sailani became the first Muslim Filipino athlete to be part of the Philippine delegation to the Asian Games at age 17 making his debut to the competition at the 1954 edition. He also competed at the 1958 and 1962 editions of the Games. He also competed at the 1956 and 1960 Summer Olympics. Sailani managed to qualify for the 1964 Summer Olympics but was not included in the Philippine delegation to the games.

National records continued to be broken by Sailani. In 1960 he was the holder of national records in the 400, 800 and 1,500 meter freestyle races. Sailani was also voted Swimmer of the Year by the PSA in 1954 and 1958.

=== Coaching ===
At the Ateneo de Manila University from 1965 to 1999, Sailani served as a swimming coach for the university In 1978 he joined the Makati Sports Club as a swimming instructor and is with the club as of 2004. Sailani also served with the Philippine Air Force from 1963 to 1991 where he trained athletes for intra-military competitions.

== Personal life ==
Sailani, while studying at the University of Santo Tomas as a high school student, had three girlfriends in sequence. At around age 20, having been part of a Catholic school, he converted to Catholicism from Islam and was baptized with the adopted name of "Martin," one of the priests serving in the school. Sailani later reverted to Islam. He met Aurora Mendoza, who would be later his wife, while working with Manolo Elizalde, one of the sponsors of his swimming stints along with Senator Ambrosio Padilla. Sailani married Mendoza in 1963 in the Catholic Church after seeking dispensation. Sailani had four children with Mendoza, a daughter and three sons.
