= Philippines national athletics team =

National sports team

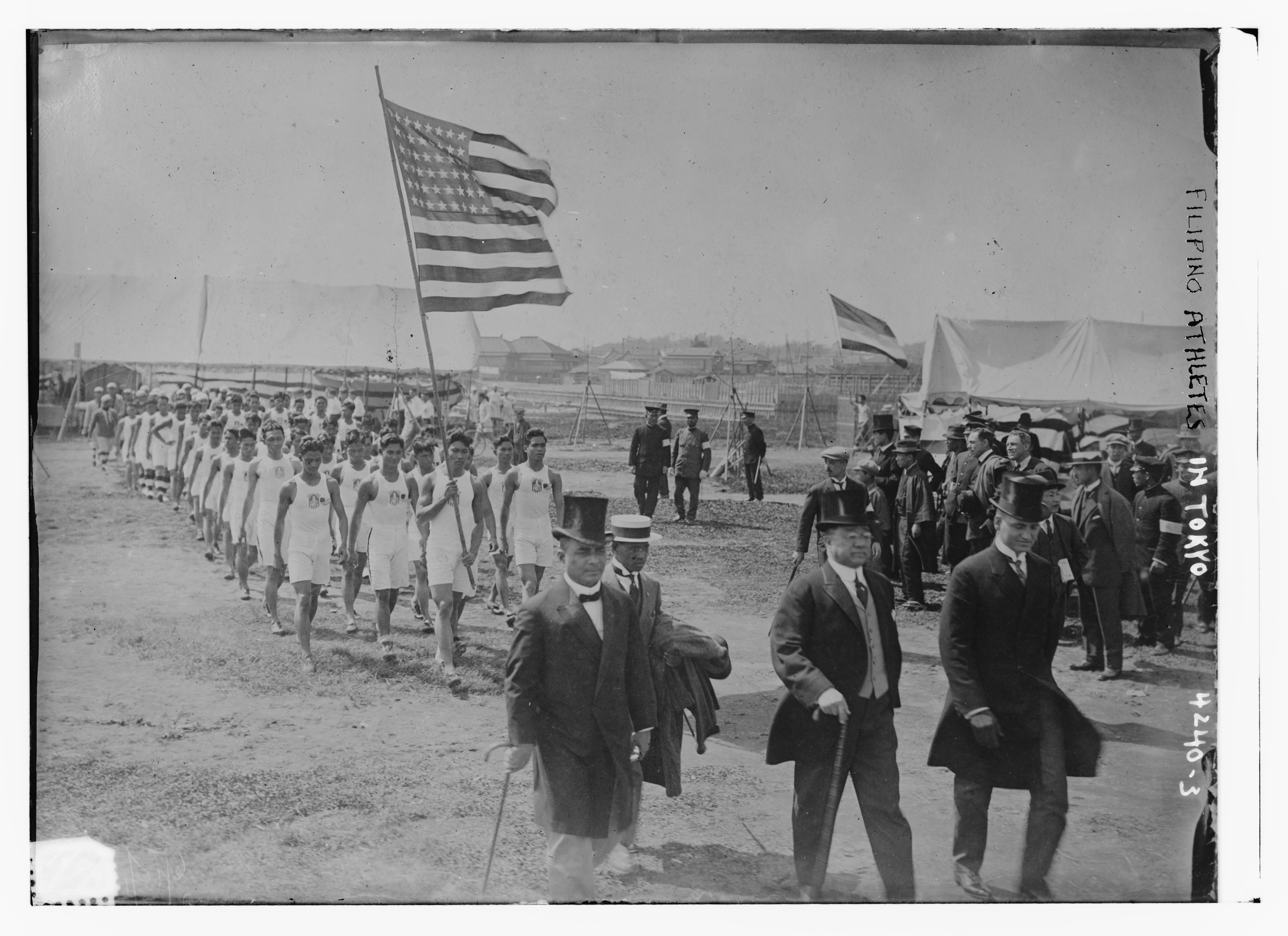
Filipino Athletes in 1917 Tokyo Far Eastern Championship Games

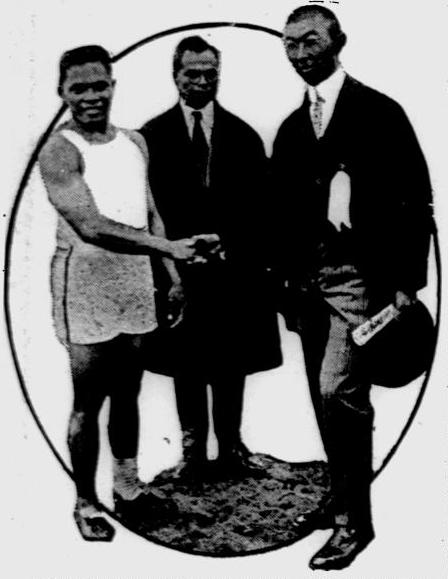
Filipino athlete, Fortunato Catalon (left) has the most gold medal at the Far Eastern Games with 9 gold medals.

The Philippines national athletics team represents the Philippines at the international athletics competitions such as Olympic Games or World Athletics Championships. Philippine Athletics Track and Field Association (PATAFA) is the governing body of athletics in the Philippines. The first participation of the Philippines in an international competition was at the Far Eastern Games in 1913. As for the olympics, their first participation began in 1924 and has continued every summer olympics except for the 1980 Moscow Olympics. The first win that the Philippines national athletics team had won though was the olympic games, receiving a bronze medal in the Men's 200 meters breaststroke, won by Teófilo Yldefonso, in the 1928 Amsterdam summer Olympics.

== Medal count ==
Event	Editions	1st edition	Total				Notes
Event	Editions	1st edition	Gold medal	Silver medal	Bronze medal	Tot.	Notes
Olympic Games	20	1924	0	0	2	2	details
World Championships	—	1983	0	1	1	2	
Asian Athletics Championships	23	1973	13	11	18	42	
Asian Games	18	1951	11	10	29	50	

== Asian Athletic Championship ==
=== All-time Medal Tally (Athletics) ===
Games	Athletes	Gold	Silver	Bronze	Total	Rank
(Philippines) 1973 Manila	-	4	3	3	10	3rd
(South Korea) 1975 Seoul	-	0	0	0	0	-
(Japan) 1979 Tokyo	-	0	0	1	1	10th
(Japan) 1981 Tokyo	-	0	2	1	3	7th
1983 Kuwait City	-	3	2	3	8	6th
(Indonesia) 1985 Jakarta	-	1	0	3	4	8th
1987 Singapore	-	2	0	0	2	6th
(India) 1989 New Delhi	-	0	1	0	1	11th
(Malaysia) 1991 Kuala Lumpur	-	0	0	0	0	-
(Philippines) 1993 Manila	-	0	0	1	1	17
(Indonesia) 1995 Jakarta	-	0	0	1	1	18th
(Japan) 1998 Fukuoka	-	0	0	0	0	-
(Indonesia) 2000 Jakarta	7	0	0	0	0	-
(Sri Lanka) 2002 Colombo	-	0	1	1	2	15th
(Philippines) 2003 Manila	-	0	0	2	2	18th
(South Korea) 2005 Incheon	14	0	1	0	1	16th
(Jordan) 2007 Ammata Sri	-	0	0	0	0	-
(China) 2009 Guangzhou	5	1	0	0	1	11th
(Japan) 2011 Kobe	6	0	0	0	0	-
(India) 2013 Pune	14	0	0	0	0	-
(China) 2015 Wuhan	1	0	0	0	0	-
(India) 2017 Bhubaneswar	7	1	1	1	3	11th
(Qatar) 2019 Doha	13	1	0	1	2	12th
(Thailand) 2023 Bangkok	21	2	0	0	2	6th
(South Korea) 2025 Gumi	17	1	0	0	1	8th
Total		16	11	18	45	15

=== Medalists ===
Name	Event	Medal
Tokal Mokalam	1973 Manila Men's 200 metres	Bronze Medal
Marcelo Benauro	1973 Manila Men's 110 metres hurdles	Bronze Medal
Abdulkadir Guiapar	1973 Manila Men's 400 metres hurdles	Gold Medal
Abdulkadir Guiapar, Clemente Lupangco, Santos Magno, Ernesto Tabayan	1973 Manila Men's 4 × 400 metres relay	Silver Medal
Amelita Alanes	1973 Manila Women's 100 metres	Gold Medal
Amelita Alanes	1973 Manila Women's 200 metres	Silver Medal
Amelita Alanes, ?, ?, ?	1973 Manila Women's 4 × 100 metres relay	Bronze Medal
Amelita Alanes, Aida Mantawel, Carmen Torres, Rosalinda Yumol	1973 Manila Women's 4 × 400 metres relay	Gold Medal
Josephine de la Viñal	1973 Manila Women's Discus throw	Gold Medal
Erlinda Lavandia	1973 Manila Women's Javelin throw	Silver Medal
Lydia de Vega	1981 Tokyo Women's 200 metres	Bronze Medal
Lydia de Vega	1981 Tokyo Women's 400 metres	Silver Medal
Team Philippines	1981 Tokyo Women's 4 × 400 metres relay	Silver Medal
Isidro del Prado	1983 Kuawait City Men's 400 metres	Gold Medal
Hector Begeo	1983 Kuawait City Men's 3000 metre steeplechase	Silver Medal
Team Philippines	1983 Kuawait City Men's 4 × 400 metres relay	Bronze Medal
Lydia De Vega	1983 Kuawait City Women's 100 metres	Gold Medal
Lydia De Vega	1983 Kuawait City Women's 200 metres	Gold Medal
Lydia De Vega	1983 Kuawait City Women's 400 metres	Bronze Medal
Agrifina de la Cruz	1983 Kuawait City Women's 400 metres hurdles	Bronze Medal
Elma Muros	1983 Kuawait City Women's Long Jump	Silver Medal
Isidro del Prado	1985 Jakarta Men's 400 metres	Gold Medal
Team Philippines	1985 Jakarta Men's 4 x 400 metres	Bronze Medal
Lydia De Vega	1985 Jakarta Women's 100 metres	Bronze Medal
Agrifina de la Cruz	1985 Jakarta Women's 400 metres hurdles	Bronze Medal
Lydia de Vega	1987 Singapore Women's 100 metres	Gold Medal
Lydia de Vega	1987 Singapore Women's 200 metres	Gold Medal
Elma Muros	1989 New Delhi Women's Long Jump	Silver Medal
Elma Muros	1993 Manila Women's Long Jump	Bronze Medal
Elma Muros	1995 Jakarta Women's Long Jump	Bronze Medal
Lerma Gabito	2002 Colombo Women's Long Jump	Silver Medal
Marestella Torres	2002 Colombo Women's Long Jump	Bronze Medal
Eduardo Buenavista	2003 Manila Men's 10,000 metres	Bronze Medal
Lerma Gabito	2003 Manila Women's Long Jump	Bronze Medal
Marestella Torres	2005 Incheon Women's Long Jump	Silver Medal
Marestella Torres	2009 Guangzhou Women's Long Jump	Gold Medal
Eric Cray	2017 Bhubaneswar Men's 400 metres hurdles	Gold Medal
Ernest Obiena	2019 Doha Men's Pole vault	Gold Medal
Natalie Uy	2019 Doha Women's Pole vault	Bronze Medal

== Asian Games ==
=== All-time medal tally (athletics) ===
Games	Athletes	Gold	Silver	Bronze	Total	Rank
(India) 1951 New Delhi	-	1	0	3	4	5
(Philippines) 1954 Manila	-	0	1	7	8	8
(Japan) 1958 Tokyo	-	3	4	4	11	4
(Indonesia) 1962 Jakarta	-	4	1	4	9	3
(Thailand) 1966 Bangkok	-	1	1	3	5	6
(Thailand) 1970 Bangkok	-	0	1	3	4	10
(Iran) 1974 Tehran	-	0	0	0	0	-
(Thailand) 1978 Bangkok	-	0	0	1	1	11
(India) 1982 New Delhi	-	1	0	1	2	7
(South Korea) 1986 Seoul	-	1	2	1	4	5
(China) 1990 Beijing	-	0	0	1	1	11
(Japan) 1994 Hiroshima	-	0	0	1	1	13
(Thailand) 1998 Bangkok	1	0	0	0	0	-
(South Korea) 2002 Busan	13	0	0	0	0	-
(Qatar) 2006 Doha	11	0	0	0	0	-
(China) 2010 Guangzhou	7	0	0	0	0	-
(South Korea) 2014 Incheon	9	0	0	0	0	-
(Indonesia) 2018 Jakarta / Palembang	13	0	0	0	0	-
(China) 2022 Hangzhou	18	1	0	0	1	11
(Japan) 2026 Nagoya	Future event					
(Qatar) 2030 Doha	Future event					
(Saudi Arabia) 2034 Riyadh	Future event					
Total	-	11	10	29	50	13

=== Medalists ===
Athletics is one of the core sports of the Asian games. Mona Sulaiman has the most gold medal with three.

Year introduced: 1951
First medal : 1951
Last medal: 1994

100 meters

Medal	Name	Sport	Event	Year
Silver	Genaro Cabrera	Athletics	Men's 100m	1954
Gold	Inocencia Solis	Athletics	Women's 100m	1958
Bronze	Isaac Gomez	Athletics	Men's 100m	1958
Bronze	Rogelio Onofre	Athletics	Men's 100m	1962
Gold	Mona Sulaiman	Athletics	Women's 100m	1962
Gold	Lydia de Vega	Athletics	Women's 100m	1982
Gold	Lydia de Vega	Athletics	Women's 100m	1986

200 meters

Medal	Name	Sport	Event	Year
Bronze	Inocencia Solis	Athletics	Women's 200m	1954
Bronze	Enrique Bautista	Athletics	Men's 200m	1958
Gold	Mona Sulaiman	Athletics	Women's 200m	1962
Silver	Amelita Alanes	Athletics	Women's 200m	1970
Silver	Lydia de Vega	Athletics	Women's 200m	1986

400 meters

Medal	Name	Sport	Event	Year
Silver	Pablo Somblingo	Athletics	Men's 400m	1958
Silver	Isidro del Prado	Athletics	Men's 400m	1986

800 meters

Medal	Name	Sport	Event	Year
Bronze	Isabel Cruz	Athletics	Women's 800m	1970

4 × 100 m Relay

Medal	Name	Sport	Event	Year
Bronze	Tito Almagro; Jovencio Ardina; Bernabe Lovina; Genaro Cabrera	Athletics	Men's 4 × 100 m Relay	1951
Bronze	Genaro Cabrera; Gaspar Azares; Eusebio Ensong; Pedro Subido	Athletics	Men's 4 × 100 m Relay	1954
Bronze	Inocencia Solis; Rogelia Ferrer; Manolita Cinco; Roberta Anore	Athletics	Women's 4 × 100 m Relay	1954
Gold	Remegio Vista; Isaac Gomez; Pedro Subido; Enrique Bautista	Athletics	Men's 4 × 100 m Relay	1958
Silver	Inocencia Solis; Rogelia Ferrer; Irene Penuela; Francisca Sanopal	Athletics	Women's 4 × 100 m Relay	1958
Gold	Remegio Vista; Isaac Gomez; Claro Pellosis; Rogelio Onofre	Athletics	Men's 4 × 100 m Relay	1962
Gold	Aida Molinos; Francisca Sanopal; Inocencia Solis; Mona Sulaiman	Athletics	Women's 4 × 100 m Relay	1962
Bronze	Rogelio Onofre; Remegio Vista; Arnulfo Valles; William Moderno	Athletics	Men's 4 × 100 m Relay	1966
Bronze	Amelita Saberon; Lucila Tolentino; Lorena Morcilla; Lydia Silva-Netto	Athletics	Women's 4 × 100 m Relay	1978

4 × 400 m Relay

Medal	Name	Sport	Event	Year
Bronze	Bienvenido Llaneta; Bernabe Lovina; Tomas Bennet; Genaro Cabrera	Athletics	Men's 4 × 400 m Relay	1951
Bronze	Pablo Somblingo; Cipriano Niera; Mauricio Paubaya; Ernesto Rodriguez	Athletics	Men's 4 × 400 m Relay	1954
Bronze	Romeo Gido; Honesto Larce; Leopoldo Arnillo; Isidro del Prado	Athletics	Men's 4 × 400 m Relay	1986

Discus Throw

Medal	Name	Sport	Event	Year
Bronze	Aurelio Amante	Athletics	Men's Discus Throw	1951
Bronze	Josephine de la Viña	Athletics	Women's Discus Throw	1962
Gold	Josephine de la Viña	Athletics	Women's Discus Throw	1966

High Jump

Medal	Name	Sport	Event	Year
Gold	Andres Franco	Athletics	Men's High Jump	1951
Bronze	Andres Franco	Athletics	Men's High Jump	1954
Silver	Lolita Lagrosas	Athletics	Women's High Jump	1958
Bronze	Ciriaco Baronda	Athletics	Men's High Jump	1962
Silver	Lolita Lagrosas	Athletics	Women's High Jump	1966
Bronze	Lolita Lagrosas	Athletics	Women's High Jump	1970

Pole Vault

Hurdles

Medal	Name	Sport	Event	Year
Bronze	Jaime Pimental	Athletics	Men's 400m Hurdles	1954
Silver	Francisca Sanopal	Athletics	Women's 80m Hurdles	1958
Bronze	Manolita Cinco	Athletics	Women's 80m Hurdles	1958
Silver	Francisca Sanopal	Athletics	Women's 80m Hurdles	1962
Bronze	Elma Muros	Athletics	Women's 400m Hurdles	1990

Javelin Throw

Medal	Name	Sport	Event	Year
Bronze	Vivencia Subido	Athletics	Women's Javelin Throw	1954
Bronze	Marcelina Alonso	Athletics	Women's Javelin Throw	1966

Long Jump

Medal	Name	Sport	Event	Year
Gold	Visitacion Badana	Athletics	Women's Long Jump	1958
Bronze	Elma Muros	Athletics	Women's Long Jump	1994

Pentathlon

Medal	Name	Sport	Event	Year
Bronze	Lolita Lagrosas	Athletics	Women's Pentathlon	1966
Bronze	Lolita Lagrosas	Athletics	Women's Pentathlon	1970

Shot Put

Medal	Name	Sport	Event	Year
Bronze	Mona Sulaiman	Athletics	Women's Shot Put	1962

Steeplechase

Medal	Name	Sport	Event	Year
Bronze	Hector Begeo	Athletics	Men's 3000m Steeplechase	1982

== SEA Games ==
=== All-time medal tally (athletics) ===
Games	Athletes	Gold	Silver	Bronze	Total	Rank
(Malaysia) 1977 Kuala Lumpur	-	1	6	5	12	6th
(Indonesia) 1979 Jakarta	-	-	-	-	-	-
(Philippines) 1981 Manila	-	-	-	-	-	-
1983 Singapore	-	11	11	10	32	1st
(Thailand) 1985 Bangkok	-	10	4	5	19	2nd
(Indonesia) 1987 Jakarta	-	6	11	2	19	4th
(Malaysia) 1989 Kuala Lumpur	-	-	-	-	-	-
(Philippines) 1991 Manila	-	-	-	-	-	-
1993 Singapore	-	-	-	-	-	-
(Thailand) 1995 Chiang Mai	-	-	-	-	-	
(Indonesia) 1997 Jakarta	-	-	-	-	-	-
(Brunei) 1999 Bandar Seri Begawan	-	-	-	-	-	-
(Malaysia) 2001 Kuala Lumpur	-	8	11	2	23	2nd
(Vietnam) 2003 Hanoi	-	8	3	5	16	3rd
(Philippines) 2005 Manila	-	9	11	9	291	2nd
(Thailand) 2007 Nakhon Ratchasima	-	5	7	9	29	5th
(Laos) 2009 Vientiane	-	7	3	4	14	4th
(Indonesia) 2011 Jakarta	-	3	9	5	17	5th
(Myanmar) 2013 Naypyidaw	-	6	4	3	13	4th
2015 Singapore	36	5	7	9	21	4th
(Malaysia) 2017 Kuala Lumpur	38	5	3	10	18	5th
2019 Philippines	-	11	8	8	27	3rd
(Vietnam) 2021 Hanoi	-	5	7	14	26	3rd
(Cambodia) 2023 Phnom Penh	-	4	10	8	22	5th
(Thailand) 2025 Chonburi	61	5	7	19	31	4th
Total		-	-	-	-	-

== Olympic Games ==
Year introduced: 1896
First medal : 1932
Last medal: 1936

=== List of Olympic medalists ===
Medal	Name	Event	Year
Bronze	Simeon Toribio	Men's high jump	1932
Bronze	Miguel White	Men's 400 metre hurdles	1936

=== All-time medal tally (athletics) ===
Games	Athletes	Gold	Silver	Bronze	Total	Rank
1924 Paris	1	0	0	0	0	–
1928 Amsterdam	2	0	0	0	-	-
1932 Los Angeles	1	0	0	1	1	13
1936 Berlin	6	0	0	1	1	14
1948 London	1	0	0	0	0	–
1952 Helsinki	1	0	0	0	0	–
1956 Melbourne	4	0	0	0	0	–
1960 Rome	7	0	0	0	0	–
1964 Tokyo	11	0	0	0	0	-
1968 Mexico City	4	0	0	0	0	–
1972 Munich	6	0	0	0	0	–
1976 Montreal	1	0	0	0	0	–
1984 Los Angeles	6	0	0	0	0	–
1988 Seoul	4	0	0	0	0	-
1992 Barcelona	3	0	0	0	0	-
1996 Atlanta	2	0	0	0	0	-
2000 Sydney	2	0	0	0	0	–
2004 Athens	2	0	0	0	0	–
2008 Beijing	2	0	0	0	0	–
2012 London	2	0	0	0	0	–
2016 Rio de Janeiro	3	0	0	0	0	-
2020 Tokyo	2	0	0	0	0	-
2024 Paris	3	0	0	0	0	-
Total		0	0	2	2	96

== Coaches ==
These are the national team coaches who have been appointed by PATAFA.

- Dario de Rosas (Head Coach)
- Jeoffrey Chua
- Joebert Delicano
- Arniel Ferrera
- Danilo Fresnido
- Sean Guevarra (Head Coach)
- John Lozada
- Emerson Obiena
- George Noel Posadas
- Julius Nierras
- Eduardo Buenavista
- Reymundo Ancero
- Juvy Palma

== See also ==
- Philippine Athletics Track and Field Association
