= India at the 1958 Asian Games =

- IOC code: IND
- NOC: Indian Olympic Association

in Tokyo
- Medals Ranked 7th: Gold 5 Silver 4 Bronze 4 Total 13

Asian Games appearances (overview)
- 1951; 1954; 1958; 1962; 1966; 1970; 1974; 1978; 1982; 1986; 1990; 1994; 1998; 2002; 2006; 2010; 2014; 2018; 2022; 2026

India participated in the 1958 Asian Games held in Tokyo, Japan from 24 May to 1 June 1958. India was ranked seventh with 5 gold medals, 4 silver medals and 4 bronze medals, in the third edition of the Asian Games.

This edition of the Asian Games marked the debut of field hockey. India won the silver medal.

== Medal summary ==
=== Medals by sport ===
Medals by sport
Sport	Rank	Gold	Silver	Bronze	Total
Athletics	3	5	2	2	9
Boxing	8	0	1	1	2
Field hockey	2	0	1	0	1
Volleyball	4	0	0	1	1
Total	7	5	4	4	13

=== Medals by gender ===
Medals by gender
Gender	Gold	Silver	Bronze	Total
Male	5	2	3	10
Female	0	2	1	3
Total	5	4	4	13

=== Medalists ===
Medal	Name	Sport	Event
Gold	Milkha Singh	Athletics	Men's 200 m
Gold	Milkha Singh	Athletics	Men's 400 m
Gold	Mohinder Singh	Athletics	Men's triple jump
Gold	Parduman Singh Brar	Athletics	Men's shot put
Gold	Balkar Singh	Athletics	Men's discus throw
Silver	Hari Singh Thapa	Boxing	Men's 75 kg
Silver	Stephie D'Souza	Athletics	Women's 200 m
Silver	Elizabeth Davenport	Athletics	Women's javelin throw
Silver	India men's national field hockey team: A. W. Caleb N. R. Chavan Leslie Claudius Chinadorai Deshmutu Balbir Singh Dosanjh Gurjit Singh Kullar Shankar Lakshman Mohammed Yakub Qureshi D. P. Rathi Bakshish Singh Balbir Singh Jr. Balkrishan Singh Gurdev Singh Gursevak Singh Jagjit Singh Udham Singh	Hockey	Men's team
Bronze	Parduman Singh Brar	Athletics	Men's discus throw
Bronze	Christine Brown; Violet Peters; Stephie D'Souza; Mary Leela Rao	Athletics	Women's 4 x 100 m relay
Bronze	Sundar Rao	Boxing	Men's 60 kg
Bronze	India men's national volleyball team: T. R. Arunchalam S. L. Gupta P. Bharathan Nair T. P. Padmanabhan Nair Abdur Rahman Raman S. K. Sheikuchan Gurdev Singh	Volleyball	Men's team

== Football ==
Head coach: (India) T. Shome

No.	Pos.	Player	Date of birth (age)	Caps	Goals	Club
	GK	Peter Thangaraj	24 December 1935 (aged 22)			(All India Football Federation) Madras Regimental Centre
	GK	S. S. Narayan	12 November 1934 (aged 23)			(All India Football Federation) Caltex Bombay
	DF	Mohammad Abdul Salaam				(All India Football Federation) Bengal
	DF	Syed Khwaja Azizuddin (c)	12 July 1930 (aged 27)			(All India Football Federation) Hyderabad City Police
	DF	Abdul Latif	15 August 1928 (aged 29)			(All India Football Federation) Mohammedan Sporting
	DF	Ahmed Hussain				(All India Football Federation) Bengal
	MF	Mariappa Kempiah	4 March 1932 (aged 26)			(All India Football Federation) Mohun Bagan
	MF	Muhammad Noor				(All India Football Federation) Hyderabad City Police
	MF	Nikhil Nandy				(All India Football Federation) Eastern Railway
	MF	Bir Bahadur Gurung				(All India Football Federation) East Bengal
	FW	K. T. Pavitran				(All India Football Federation) Bombay
	FW	Pradip Kumar Banerjee	23 June 1936 (aged 21)			(All India Football Federation) Bengal
	FW	Chuni Goswami	15 January 1938 (aged 20)			(All India Football Federation) Mohun Bagan
	FW	M. Rahmatullah				(All India Football Federation) Bengal
	FW	D. Damodaram				(All India Football Federation) Bengal
	FW	Dharmalingam Kannan	8 July 1936 (aged 21)			(All India Football Federation) Hyderabad
	FW	Tulsidas Balaram	4 October 1936 (aged 21)			(All India Football Federation) East Bengal

=== Preliminary round ===
Team	Pld	W	D	L	GF	GA	GR	Pts
Indonesia	2	2	0	0	6	3	2.000	4
India	2	1	0	1	4	4	1.000	2
Burma	2	0	0	2	4	7	0.571	0

26 May
16:00

Burma	2–3	India
		Goswami; Balaram; Damodaran

Korakuen Velodrome, Tokyo

28 May

India	1–2	Indonesia
Rahmatullah 35'		Thio Him Tjiang 11' 53'

Tokyo

=== Quarterfinals ===
30 May

Hong Kong	2–5 (a.e.t.)	India
		Rahmatullah; Goswami; Balaram; Damodaran

Tokyo

=== Semifinals ===
31 May

India	1–3	South Korea
Damodaran 67'		Choi Chung-min 13'; Lee Soo-nam 75'; Moon Jung-sik

National Stadium, Tokyo

=== Bronze medal match ===
1 June

Indonesia	4–1	India
Saari 10'; Suratmo 59'; Sunaryo 60'; Phwa Sian Liong 88'		Balaram 46' (pen.)

National Stadium, Tokyo
Attendance: 46,000
