= Israel at the 1958 Asian Games =

Israel's competition at the 1958 Asian Games

- IOC code: ISR
- NOC: Olympic Committee of Israel

in Tokyo
- Medals Ranked 14th: Gold 0 Silver 0 Bronze 2 Total 2

Asian Games appearances (overview)
- 1954; 1958; 1962; 1966; 1970; 1974

Israel participated in the 1958 Asian Games held in Tokyo, Japan, from 24 May to 1 June 1958. Following the 1958 games, Israel was unable to participate again until the 1966 Asian Games because during the 1962 Asian Games the host country Indonesia, refused to permit the participation of Israel due to political reasons, stating it would cause issues with their relationship with the Arab states.

== Medals ==
Games	Gold	Silver	Bronze	Total
Athletics	0	0	2	2
Totals (1 entries)	0	0	2	2

== Athletics ==
=== Medal table ===
Rank	Nation	Gold	Silver	Bronze	Total
1	Israel	0	0	2	2
Totals (1 entries)		0	0	2	2

=== Men ===
Event	Gold		Silver		Bronze	
Shot put	Parduman Singh Brar; India	15.04; GR	Hitoshi Goto; Japan	14.80	Uri Zohar; Israel	14.75
Javelin throw	Muhammad Nawaz; Pakistan	69.41; GR	Jalal Khan; Pakistan	66.00	Baruch Feinberg; Israel	63.78

== Football ==
=== Preliminary round - Group D ===
==== Standings ====
Team	Pld	W	D	L	GF	GA	GAV	Pts
South Korea	2	2	0	0	7	1	7.000	4
Israel	2	2	0	0	6	1	6.000	4
Singapore	2	0	0	2	2	4	0.500	0
Iran	2	0	0	2	0	9	0.000	0

==== Matches ====
26 May	Israel	4–0	Iran	Metropolitan Stadium, Tokyo
14:00

28 May	Israel	2–1	Singapore	Korakuen Velodrome, Tokyo

=== Knockout round ===
==== Standings ====
Rank	Team	Pld	W	D	L	GF	GA	GD	Pts
1st place, gold medalist(s)	Republic of China	5	5	0	0	11	4	+7	10
2nd place, silver medalist(s)	South Korea	5	4	0	1	15	6	+9	8
3rd place, bronze medalist(s)	Indonesia	5	4	0	1	13	6	+7	8
4	India	5	2	0	3	12	13	−1	4
5	Israel	3	2	0	1	6	3	+3	4
6	Hong Kong	3	2	0	1	8	6	+2	4
7	South Vietnam	3	1	1	1	8	5	+3	3
8	Philippines	3	1	0	2	4	9	−5	2
9	Pakistan	2	0	1	1	2	4	−2	1
10	Singapore	2	0	0	2	2	4	−2	0
11	Burma	2	0	0	2	3	6	−3	0
12	Japan	2	0	0	2	0	3	−3	0
13	Malaya	2	0	0	2	2	8	−6	0
14	Iran	2	0	0	2	0	9	−9	0

==== Bracket ====
Quarterfinals
30 May
Republic of China	2
Israel	0
30 May
Indonesia	5
Philippines	2
30 May
Hong Kong	2
India (aet)	5
30 May
South Korea	3
South Vietnam	1

Semifinals
31 May
Republic of China	1
Indonesia	0
31 May
India	1
South Korea	3

Gold medal match
1 June
Republic of China (aet)	3
South Korea	2
Bronze medal match
1 June
Indonesia	4
India	1

==== Matches ====
30 May	Republic of China	2–0	Israel	Metropolitan Stadium, Tokyo
