= Athletics at the 1962 Asian Games =

- Venue: Senayan Main Stadium
- Dates: 25–30 August 1962

The Athletics events at the 1962 Asian Games were contested at the Senayan Main Stadium, Jakarta, Indonesia from 25 to 30 August 1962.

== Medalists ==
=== Men ===
Event	Gold		Silver		Bronze	
100 m	Mohammad Sarengat; Indonesia	10.5	Mani Jegathesan; Malaya	10.6	Rogelio Onofre; Philippines	10.7
200 m	Mani Jegathesan; Malaya	21.3; GR	Hideo Iijima; Japan	21.5	Mohammad Sarengat; Indonesia	21.6
400 m	Milkha Singh; India	46.9	Makhan Singh; India	47.5	Kimitada Hayase; Japan	48.3
800 m	Mamoru Morimoto; Japan	1:52.6	Daljit Singh; India	1:52.6	Amrit Pal; India	1:53.4
1500 m	Mohinder Singh; India	3:48.6; GR	Amrit Pal; India	3:50.1	Satsuo Iwashita; Japan	3:51.5
5000 m	Mubarak Shah; Pakistan	14:27.2; GR	Saburo Yokomizo; Japan	14:30.2	Tarlok Singh; India	14:31.4
10,000 m	Tarlok Singh; India	30:21.4; GR	Teruo Funai; Japan	30:21.6	Gurnam Singh; Indonesia	30:47.2
110 m hurdles	Mohammad Sarengat; Indonesia	14.3; GR	Ghulam Raziq; Pakistan	14.3 =GR	Hirokazu Yasuda; Japan	14.4
400 m hurdles	Keiji Ogushi; Japan	52.2; GR	Keiki Iijima; Japan	52.4	Karu Selvaratnam; Malaya	53.4
3000 m steeplechase	Mubarak Shah; Pakistan	8:57.8; GR	Saburo Yokomizo; Japan	8:58.8	Zenji Okuzawa; Japan	9:09.6
4 × 100 m relay	Philippines; Remegio Vista; Isaac Gomez; Claro Pellosis; Rogelio Onofre	41.3	Japan; Kiyoshi Asai; Takeo Tamura; Takayuki Okazaki; Hideo Iijima	41.5	Malaya; Mani Jegathesan; V. Vijiaratnam; Shahrudin Mohd Ali; Thor Gim Soon	41.5
4 × 400 m relay	India; Daljit Singh; Jagdish Singh; Makhan Singh; Milkha Singh	3:10.2; GR	Malaya; Karu Selvaratnam; Abdul Rahim Ahmad; Asir Victor; Mani Jegathesan	3:13.8	Japan; Kimitada Hayase; Keiji Ogushi; Mamoru Morimoto; Keiki Iijima	3:14.6
Marathon	Masayuki Nagata; Japan	2:34:54.2	Muhammad Yousaf; Pakistan	2:43:02.0	Myitung Naw; Burma	2:49:37.1
High jump	Kuniyoshi Sugioka; Japan	2.08; GR	Nagalingam Ethirveerasingam; Ceylon	1.98	Ciriaco Baronda; Philippines	1.95
Pole vault	Hisao Morita; Japan	4.40; GR	Kuniaki Yamazaki; Japan	4.40 =GR	Allah Ditta; Pakistan	4.10
Long jump	Takayuki Okazaki; Japan	7.41	Kaihei Oda; Japan	7.36	Awang Papilaya; Indonesia	7.25
Triple jump	Koji Sakurai; Japan	15.57	Tomio Ota; Japan	15.37	Awang Papilaya; Indonesia	14.70
Shot put	Teruo Itokawa; Japan	15.57; GR	Dinshaw Irani; India	14.99	Joginder Singh; India	14.91
Discus throw	Shozo Yanagawa; Japan	47.71; GR	Parduman Singh Brar; India	47.01	Shohei Kaneko; Japan	46.21
Hammer throw	Noboru Okamoto; Japan	63.88; GR	Takeo Sugawara; Japan	61.66	Muhammad Iqbal; Pakistan	59.18
Javelin throw	Takashi Miki; Japan	74.56; GR	Muhammad Nawaz; Pakistan	74.16	Hideta Kanai; Japan	70.68
Decathlon	Gurbachan Singh Randhawa; India	6739	Shosuke Suzuki; Japan	6195	Cyril Perera; Malaya	5575

=== Women ===
Event	Gold		Silver		Bronze	
100 m	Mona Sulaiman; Philippines	11.8; GR	Ikuko Yoda; Japan	12.3	Takako Inokuchi; Japan	12.3
200 m	Mona Sulaiman; Philippines	24.5	Haruko Yamazaki; Japan	25.7	Nirmala Dissanayake; Ceylon	25.8
800 m	Chizuko Tanaka; Japan	2:18.2; GR	Ryuko Hirano; Japan	2:18.4	Soewatini; Indonesia	2:20.8
80 m hurdles	Ikuko Yoda; Japan	11.5	Francisca Sanopal; Philippines	11.9	Kiyoko Shimada; Japan	11.9
4 × 100 m relay	Philippines; Aida Molinos; Francisca Sanopal; Inocencia Solis; Mona Sulaiman	48.6 =GR	Japan; Haruko Yamazaki; Takako Inokuchi; Kiyoko Shimada; Ikuko Yoda	48.6 =GR	Indonesia; Soeratmi; Ernawati; Willy Tomasoa; Wiewiek Machwijar	50.5
High jump	Kinuko Tsutsumi; Japan	1.60; GR	Myint Myint Aye; Burma	1.50	Shared silver	
High jump	Kinuko Tsutsumi; Japan	1.60; GR	Tiparpan Leenasean; Thailand	1.50	Shared silver	
Long jump	Sachiko Kishimoto; Japan	5.75	Fumiko Ito; Japan	5.71	Maureen Ann Lee; Malaya	5.31
Shot put	Seiko Obonai; Japan	14.04; GR	Yasuko Matsuda; Japan	13.71	Mona Sulaiman; Philippines	11.97
Discus throw	Keiko Murase; Japan	45.90; GR	Seiko Obonai; Japan	40.98	Josephine de la Viña; Philippines	37.79
Javelin throw	Hiroko Sato; Japan	48.15; GR	Fujie Abe; Japan	47.34	Elizabeth Davenport; India	44.82

== Medal table ==
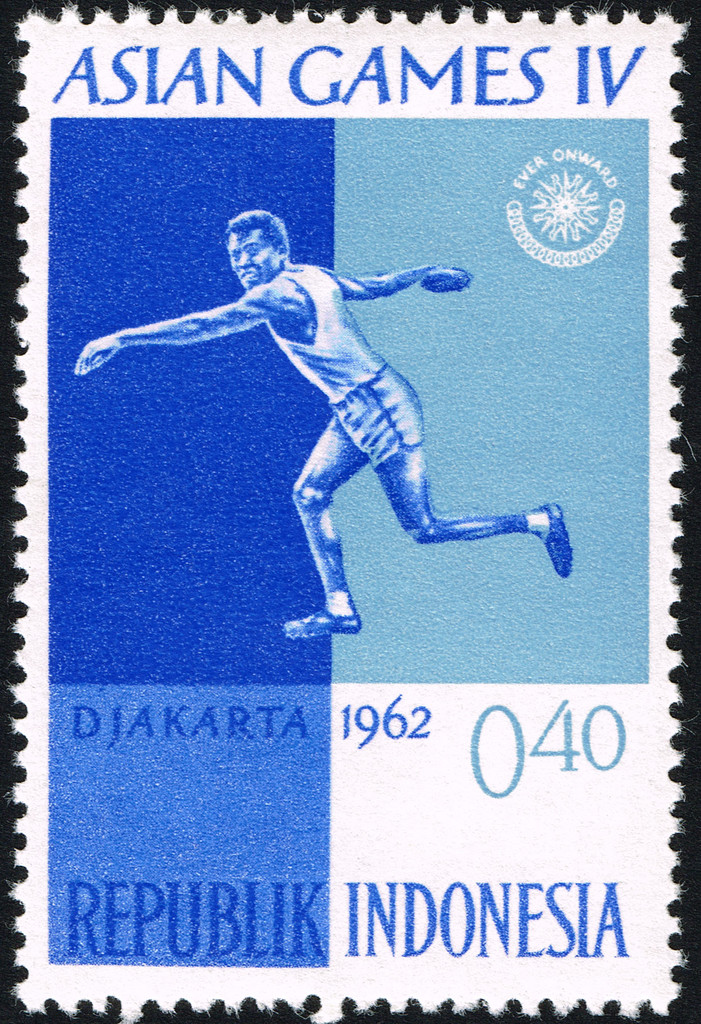
Athletics at the 1962 Asian Games on a stamp of Indonesia

Rank	Nation	Gold	Silver	Bronze	Total
1	Japan (JPN)	18	19	9	46
2	India (IND)	5	5	4	14
3	Philippines (PHI)	4	1	4	9
4	Pakistan (PAK)	2	3	2	7
5	Indonesia (INA)	2	0	6	8
6	Malaya (MAL)	1	2	4	7
7	Burma (BIR)	0	1	1	2
7	Ceylon (CEY)	0	1	1	2
9	Thailand (THA)	0	1	0	1
Totals (9 entries)		32	33	31	96
