= Athletics at the 1958 Asian Games =

- Venue: National Stadium
- Dates: 25–29 May 1958

The Athletics events at the 1958 Asian Games were contested at the National Stadium, Tokyo, Japan from 25 to 29 May 1958.

== Medalists ==
=== Men ===
Event	Gold		Silver		Bronze	
100 m	Abdul Khaliq; Pakistan	10.9	Kyohei Ushio; Japan	11.0	Isaac Gomez; Philippines	11.1
200 m	Milkha Singh; India	21.6 =GR	Abdul Khaliq; Pakistan	21.7	Enrique Bautista; Philippines	22.2
400 m	Milkha Singh; India	47.0	Pablo Somblingo; Philippines	48.5	Abdul Rahim Ahmad; Malaya	48.8
800 m	Yoshitaka Muroya; Japan	1:52.1; GR	Mahmoud Khaligh Razavi; Iran	1:52.2	Sim Sang-ok; South Korea	1:52.3
1500 m	Mahmoud Khaligh Razavi; Iran	3:57.6	Michio Okayama; Japan	3:58.2	Sim Sang-ok; South Korea	3:59.1
5000 m	Osamu Inoue; Japan	14:39.4; GR	Han Sung-chul; South Korea	14:41.8	Ali Baghbanbashi; Iran	14:43.0
10,000 m	Takashi Baba; Japan	30:48.4; GR	Mubarak Shah; Pakistan	30:49.8	Ali Baghbanbashi; Iran	30:50.4
110 m hurdles	Ghulam Raziq; Pakistan	14.4; GR	Yang Chuan-kwang; Republic of China	14.8	Hirokazu Yasuda; Japan	14.8
400 m hurdles	Tsai Cheng-fu; Republic of China	52.4; GR	Keiji Ogushi; Japan	52.8	Yang Chuan-kwang; Republic of China	53.0
3000 m steeplechase	Mubarak Shah; Pakistan	9:03.0; GR	Masayuki Nunogami; Japan	9:04.2	Susumu Takahashi; Japan	9:05.8
4 × 100 m relay	Philippines; Remegio Vista; Isaac Gomez; Pedro Subido; Enrique Bautista	41.4	Japan; Kyohei Ushio; Masaru Kamata; Yoshiaki Hara; Yasuhiro Yanagi	41.4	Pakistan; Muhammad Sharif Butt; Ghulam Raziq; Muhammad Ramzan Ali; Abdul Khaliq	41.6
4 × 400 m relay	Japan; Kanji Akagi; Keiji Ogushi; Takejiro Hayashi; Yoshitaka Muroya	3:13.9; GR	Republic of China; Chen Ying-long; Chen Huey-kuen; Chen Lo-chen; Tsai Cheng-fu	3:18.0	Philippines; Aparicio Mequi; Erasma Arellano; Antonio Suplido; Pablo Somblingo	3:18.2
Marathon	Lee Chang-hoon; South Korea	2:32:55; GR	Myitung Naw; Burma	2:42:46	Nobuyoshi Sadanaga; Japan	2:43:44
High jump	Nagalingam Ethirveerasingam; Ceylon	2.03; GR	Noboru Kasamatsu; Japan	2.00	Yukio Ishikawa; Japan	1.95
Pole vault	Noriaki Yasuda; Japan	4.20; GR	Kozo Akasaka; Japan	4.20 =GR	Allah Ditta; Pakistan	4.20 =GR
Long jump	Suh Yong-joo; South Korea	7.54; GR	Yang Chuan-kwang; Republic of China	7.49	Muhammad Ramzan Ali; Pakistan	7.30
Triple jump	Mohinder Singh; India	15.62; GR	Koji Sakurai; Japan	15.41	Tomio Ota; Japan	15.19
Shot put	Parduman Singh Brar; India	15.04; GR	Hitoshi Goto; Japan	14.80	Uri Zohar; Israel	14.75
Discus throw	Balkar Singh; India	47.66; GR	Muhammad Ayub; Pakistan	46.01	Parduman Singh Brar; India	45.67
Hammer throw	Muhammad Iqbal; Pakistan	60.97; GR	Masaru Urushibata; Japan	57.88	Malik Noor; Pakistan	54.03
Javelin throw	Muhammad Nawaz; Pakistan	69.41; GR	Jalal Khan; Pakistan	66.00	Baruch Feinberg; Israel	63.78
Decathlon	Yang Chuan-kwang; Republic of China	7101; GR	Kiyoshi Katsuki; Japan	5968	Shosuke Suzuki; Japan	5939

=== Women ===
Event	Gold		Silver		Bronze	
100 m	Inocencia Solis; Philippines	12.5 =GR	Sakura Fukuyama; Japan	12.7	Yuko Kobayashi; Japan	12.7
200 m	Yuko Kobayashi; Japan	25.9	Stephie D'Souza; India	26.2	Hiroko Shiojiri; Japan	26.3
80 m hurdles	Michiko Iwamoto; Japan	11.6; GR	Francisca Sanopal; Philippines	11.6 =GR	Manolita Cinco; Philippines	12.1
4 × 100 m relay	Japan; Sakura Fukuyama; Yoshie Fujii; Ikuko Yoda; Yuko Kobayashi	48.6; GR	Philippines; Inocencia Solis; Rogelia Ferrer; Irene Penuela; Francisca Sanopal	49.0	India; Christine Brown; Stephie D'Souza; Violet Peters; Mary Leela Rao	49.4
High jump	Emiko Kamiya; Japan	1.58; GR	Lolita Lagrosas; Philippines	1.56	Yumiko Kondo; Japan	1.54
Long jump	Visitacion Badana; Philippines	5.64	Mikiko Tozaki; Japan	5.49	Huang Hsing; Republic of China	5.32
Shot put	Seiko Obonai; Japan	13.26; GR	Motoko Yoshida; Japan	13.07	Wu Jin-yun; Republic of China	11.46
Discus throw	Hiroko Uchida; Japan	41.90	Seiko Obonai; Japan	40.29	Huang Chun-men; Republic of China	33.65
Javelin throw	Yoriko Shida; Japan	47.15; GR	Elizabeth Davenport; India	46.07	Karnah Soekarta; Indonesia	45.03

== Medal table ==
Rank	Nation	Gold	Silver	Bronze	Total
1	Japan (JPN)	12	15	9	36
2	Pakistan (PAK)	5	4	4	13
3	India (IND)	5	2	2	9
4	Philippines (PHI)	3	4	4	11
5	Republic of China (ROC)	2	3	4	9
6	South Korea (KOR)	2	1	2	5
7	Iran (IRN)	1	1	2	4
8	Ceylon (CEY)	1	0	0	1
9	Burma (BIR)	0	1	0	1
10	Israel (ISR)	0	0	2	2
11	Indonesia (INA)	0	0	1	1
11	Malaya (MAL)	0	0	1	1
Totals (12 entries)		31	31	31	93
