= Boxing at the 1958 Asian Games – Men's 75 kg =

Boxing competitions

Men's 75 kg at the 1958 Asian Games
- Venue: Korakuen Ice Palace
- Date: 29–31 May 1958
- Competitors: 4 from 4 nations

Medalists
gold medal	Chang Lo-pu	Republic of China
silver medal	Hari Singh Thapa	India
bronze medal	Shoichi Matsuura	Japan
bronze medal	Leon Khachatourian	Iran

The men's middleweight (75 kilograms) event at the 1958 Asian Games took place from 29 to 31 May 1958 at Korakuen Ice Palace, Tokyo, Japan.

== Schedule ==
All times are Japan Standard Time (UTC+09:00)

Date	Time	Event
Thursday, 29 May 1958	14:00	Semifinals
Saturday, 31 May 1958	18:00	Final

== Results ==
Legend

- PTS — Won by points

Semifinals		Final
Shoichi Matsuura (JPN)
Chang Lo-pu (ROC)	PTS	Chang Lo-pu (ROC)	PTS
Hari Singh Thapa (IND)	PTS	Hari Singh Thapa (IND)
Leon Khachatourian (IRN)
