= Athletics at the 1964 Summer Olympics – Women's 4 × 100 metres relay =

Women's 4 × 100 metres relay at the Games of the XVIII Olympiad
- Venue: Olympic Stadium
- Dates: 20–21 October 1964
- Competitors: 60 from 15 nations
- Winning time: 43.6

Medalists
1st place, gold medalist(s)		Teresa Ciepły; Irena Kirszenstein; Halina Górecka; Ewa Kłobukowska	Poland
2nd place, silver medalist(s)		Willye White; Wyomia Tyus; Marilyn White; Edith McGuire	United States
3rd place, bronze medalist(s)		Janet Simpson; Mary Rand; Daphne Arden; Dorothy Hyman	Great Britain

The women's 4 × 100 metres relay was the only women's relay on the Athletics at the 1964 Summer Olympics program in Tokyo. It was held on 20 October and 21 October 1964. 15 teams, for a total of 60 athletes, from 15 nations competed. The first round was held on 20 October with the final on 21 October. The world record time of the Polish team was erased in 1969, after Ewa Klobukowska failed a gendertest in Kiev, but their gold medal result was allowed to stand.

== Results ==
=== First round ===
The top four teams in each of the 2 heats advanced.

==== First round, heat 1 ====
Place	Nation	Athletes	Time (hand)	Time (automatic)
1	Poland	Teresa Ciepły, Irena Kirszenstein, Halina Górecka, Ewa Kłobukowska	44.6	44.62
2	Great Britain	Janet Simpson, Mary Rand, Daphne Arden, Dorothy Hyman	44.9	44.96
3	Soviet Union	Galina Gayda, Renate Lace, Lyudmila Samotyosova, Galina Popova	44.9	44.98
4	Australia	Dianne Bowering, Marilyn Black, Margaret Burvill, Joyce Bennett	45.2	45.28
5	Jamaica	Adlin Mair, Una Morris, Vilma Charlton, Carmen Smith	46.0	–
6	Panama	Delceita Oakley, Lorraine Dunn, Jean Mitchell, Marcela Daniel	47.6	–
7	South Korea	Park Hui-suk, Han Myung Hee, Lee Hak-ja, Song Yang Ja	50.1	–

==== First round, heat 2 ====
Place	Nation	Athletes	Time (hand)	Time (automatic)
1	United States	Willye White, Wyomia Tyus, Marilyn White, Edith McGuire	44.8	44.83
2	United Team of Germany	Karin Frisch, Erika Pollmann, Martha Pensberger, Jutta Heine	45.0	45.01
3	Hungary	Erzsébet Bartos, Margit Nemesházi, Antónia Munkácsi, Ida Such	45.9	45.91
4	France	Marlene Canguio, Daniele Gueneau, Michele Lurot, Denise Guenard	46.0	–
5	Argentina	Maria Formeiro, Susana Ritchie, Evelia Farina, Alicia Kaufmanas	46.7	–
6	Japan	Reiko Ezoe, Ikuko Yoda, Etsuko Miyamoto, Takako Inoguchi	47.0	–
7	Philippines	Aida Molinos, Loretta Barcenas, Nelly Restar, Mona Sulaiman	48.8	–
8	Thailand	Preya Dechdumrong, Kusolwan Soraja, Budsabong Yimploy, Samroey Charanggool	50.3	–

=== Final ===
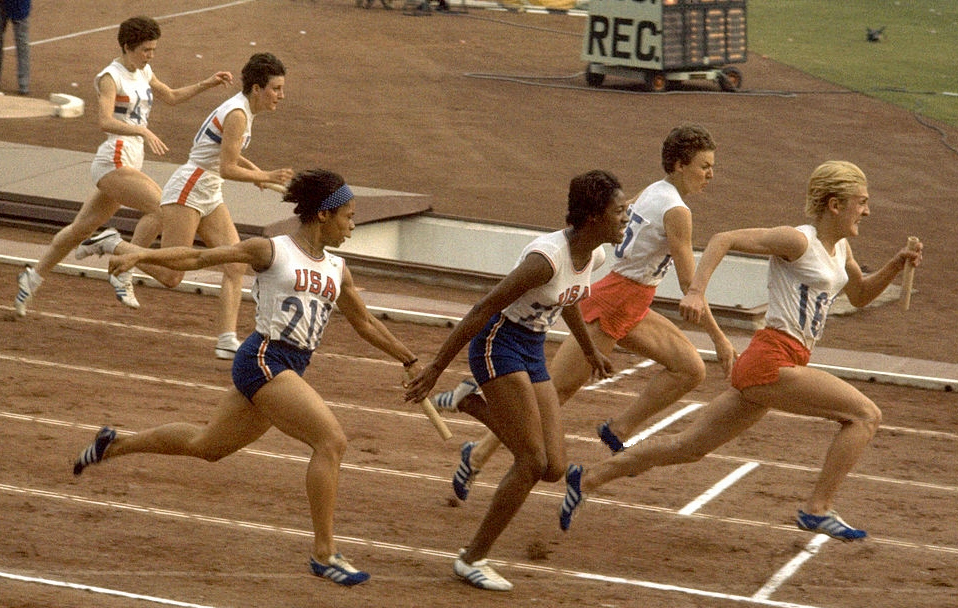
Daphne Arden and Dorothy Hyman (UK), Willye White and Edith McGuire (USA), and Halina Górecka and Ewa Klobukowska (Poland) compete in the final

All three medallist teams broke the world record in the final.

Place	Nation	Athletes	Time (hand)	Time (automatic)
1	Poland	Teresa Ciepły, Irena Kirszenstein, Halina Górecka, Ewa Kłobukowska	43.6 WR	
2	United States	Willye White, Wyomia Tyus, Marilyn White, Edith McGuire	43.9	43.92
3	Great Britain	Janet Simpson, Mary Rand, Daphne Arden, Dorothy Hyman	44.0	44.09
4	Soviet Union	Galina Gayda, Renate Lace, Lyudmila Samotyosova, Galina Popova	44.4	44.44
5	United Team of Germany	Karin Frisch, Erika Pollmann, Martha Pensberger, Jutta Heine	44.7	–
6	Australia	Dianne Bowering, Marilyn Black, Margaret Burvill, Joyce Bennett	45.0	–
7	Hungary	Erzsébet Bartos, Margit Nemesházi, Antónia Munkácsi, Ida Such	45.2	–
8	France	Marlene Canguio, Daniele Gueneau, Michele Lurot, Denise Guenard	46.1	–
