= Remegio Vista =

Filipino sprinter (born 1934)

Personal information
- Nationality: Filipino
- Born: May 25, 1934 Tibiao, Antique, Philippine Islands
- Died: unknown
- Height: 5 ft 3 in (159 cm)
- Weight: 117 lb (53 kg)

Sport
- Sport: Sprinting
- Event: 4 × 100 metres relay
Medal record
Men's Athletics
Representing Philippines
Event	1st	2nd	3rd
Asian Games	2	0	1
Total	2	0	1
Asian Games
Gold medal – first place	1958 Tokyo	4 × 100 metres relay
Gold medal – first place	1962 Jakarta	4 × 100 metres relay
Bronze medal – third place	1966 Bangkok	4 × 100 metres relay

Remegio Vista (born May 25, 1934, date of death unknown) was a Filipino sprinter. He competed in the men's 4 × 100 metres relay at the 1960 Summer Olympics. Vista is deceased.

== Early life ==
Remegio Vista was born on May 25, 1934, in Tibiao, Antique in the Philippines.

== Career ==
Vista competed three times in the Asian Games (1958, 1962, 1966), where he won 2 gold medals and a bronze medal. He also competed at the 1960 Summer Olympics in Rome.

=== Asian Games ===
On the 1958 Asian Games in Tokyo, he competed in the men's 4 × 100 metres relay with Isaac Gomez, Pedro Subido and Enrique Bautista. They won the gold medal at the end of the event.

On the 1962 Asian Games in Jakarta, he competed again in the men's 4 × 100 metres relay with Isaac Gomez, Claro Pellosis and Rogelio Onofre. They won the gold medal once again at the end of the event.

When he competed at the 1966 Asian Games in Bangkok with Rogelio Onofre, Arnulfo Valles and William Mordeno in the men's 4 × 100 metres relay, they finished in 3rd place and got a bronze medal.

=== Olympic Games ===
Vista competed at the 1960 Summer Olympics in Rome with Isaac Gomez, Enrique Bautista and Rogelio Onofre but only finished in 4th place in the men's 4 × 100 metres relay.
