= Amrit Pal =

Amrit Pal may refer to:

- Amrit Pal (athlete) (born 1939), Indian track and field athlete
- Amrit Pal (actor) (c. 1941–2017), Indian actor
