= Etsuko =

- Gender: Female

Origin
- Origin: Japanese
- Meaning: Different meanings depending on the kanji used

Etsuko (written: 悦子, 英津子, えつ子, えつこ in hiragana or エツコ in katakana) is a feminine Japanese given name. The most common meaning is joy child. Notable people with the name include:

- Etsuko Hirose (広瀬 悦子; born 1979), Japanese classical pianist
- Etsuko Ichihara (市原 悦子; 1936–2019), Japanese actress
- Etsuko Inada (稲田 悦子; 1924–2003), Japanese figure skater
- Etsuko Inoue (井上 悦子; born 1964), Japanese tennis player
- Etsuko Ishikawa (石川 悦子; born 1965), Japanese actress and voice actress
- Etsuko Kobayashi (小林 悦子; born 1992), Japanese cricketer
- Etsuko Komiya (小宮 悦子; 1919–2014), Japanese sprinter
- Etsuko Kozakura (小桜 エツコ; born 1971), Japanese voice actress
- Etsuko Mita (三田 英津子; born 1969), Japanese professional wrestler
- Etsuko Miyamoto (宮本 悦子; born 1943), Japanese sprinter
- Etsuko Nakanishi (中西 悦子; born 1977), Japanese drummer
- Etsuko Niki (仁木 悦子; 1928–1986), Japanese novelist
- Etsuko Nishio (西尾 えつ子; born 1973), Japanese singer, actress and model
- Etsuko Shihomi (志穂美 悦子; born 1955), Japanese actress
- Etsuko Tada (多田悦子; born 1989), Japanese professional boxer
- Etsuko Tahara (田原 悦子), Japanese football player
- Etsuko Toganoo (栂野尾 悦子), Japanese badminton player
- Etsuko Yakushimaru (やくしまる えつこ), Japanese singer

== See also ==
- 8691 Etsuko, a main-belt asteroid
