= Athletics at the 1959 Summer Universiade – Men's javelin throw =

The men's javelin throw event at the 1959 Summer Universiade was held at the Stadio Comunale di Torino in Turin on 6 September 1959.

The winning margin was 15 cm which as of 2024 remains the narrowest winning margin in the men's javelin at these games.

== Results ==
Rank	Name	Nationality	Result	Notes
1st place, gold medalist(s)	Hermann Salomon	West Germany	75.95	
2nd place, silver medalist(s)	Gergely Kulcsár	Hungary	75.80	
3rd place, bronze medalist(s)	Alexandru Bizim	Romania	72.81	
4	Giovanni Lievore	Italy	71.30	
5	Raffaele Bonaiuto	Italy	69.52	
6	Günther Albrecht	West Germany	65.89	
7	Takashi Miki	Japan	64.12	
8	Geoff Hill	Great Britain	63.31	
9	Miloš Vojtek	Czechoslovakia	62.27	
