= William Mordeno =

Filipino sprinter (1947/1948–2022)

Personal information
- Nationality: Filipino
- Born: 1947 or 1948
- Died: January 30, 2022 (aged 74) Butuan, Philippines

Sport
- Sport: Athletics
- Event(s): 4 × 100 metres relay, 100 metres sprint
Medal record
Men's Athletics
Representing Philippines
Asian Games
Bronze medal – third place	1966 Bangkok	4 × 100 metres relay

William Mordeno (1947/1948 – January 30, 2022) was a Filipino sprinter.

== Biography ==
One of the top-sprinters in the Philippines in the 1960s, he competed at the 1966 Asian Games where he won a bronze in the men's 4 × 100 metres relay with Rogelio Onofre, Remegio Vista, and Arnulfo Valles under coach Ruperto Evangelista. He is also known for competing in the 100 metre sprint, ranking behind Onofre and Valles at his peak.

He retired in the 1970s, to work as a provincial sports regulation officer in Agusan del Sur until 2010. At age 74, he was among the casualties of the COVID-19 pandemic, dying on January 30, 2022, in Butuan of complications from COVID-19.
