= Athletics at the 1963 Summer Universiade – Men's pole vault =

The men's pole vault event at the 1963 Summer Universiade was held at the Estádio Olímpico Monumental in Porto Alegre in September 1963.

The winning margin was 30 cm which as of 2024 remains the only time the men's pole vault was won by more than 20 cm at these games.

== Results ==
Rank	Athlete	Nationality	Result	Notes
1st place, gold medalist(s)	Gennadiy Bliznetsov	Soviet Union	4.60	
2nd place, silver medalist(s)	Alain Moreaux	France	4.30	
3rd place, bronze medalist(s)	Bernard Balastre	France	4.20	
4	Hisao Morita	Japan	4.00	
4	Trevor Burton	Great Britain	4.00	
	Gérard Barras	Switzerland	NM	
