= Rogelio Onofre =

Filipino-American sprinter (1938–2025)

Personal information
- Nationality: Filipino
- Born: December 12, 1938 Tarlac, Tarlac, Philippine Commonwealth
- Died: June 23, 2025 (aged 86) Los Angeles, California, U.S.
- Height: 5 ft 9 in (174 cm)
- Weight: 130 lb (59 kg)

Sport
- Sport: Sprinting
- Events: 100 meters, 4 × 100-meter relay
Medal record
Men's athletics
Representing Philippines
Asian Games
Gold medal – first place	1962 Jakarta	4 × 100 m relay
Bronze medal – third place	1966 Bangkok	4 × 100 m relay
Bronze medal – third place	1962 Jakarta	100 m

Rogelio P. Onofre (December 12, 1938 – June 23, 2025) was a Filipino-born American sprinter. He competed in the men's 100 metres at the 1964 Summer Olympics.

== Early life and education ==
Onofre was born on 12 December 1938 in the then town of Tarlac in the province of Tarlac but grew up in Dagupan, Pangasinan. According to his own account, Onofre often competed and won in local athletic races in his hometown of Dagupan barefooted prior to entering high school. He also competed in races in neighboring Binmaley as well in regional private schools athletics meets. In 1963, Onofre was given a Fulbright scholarship enabling him to pursue studies in Colorado and Los Angeles in the United States.

== Career ==
Onofre initially competed in men's high jump in regional private school meets and was scouted by coaches of the Philippine athletics team becoming a candidate for the 1958 Asian Games in Tokyo. He shifted to 100 and 200-meter runs since he felt inadequate in high jump and he eventually secured a berth in the men's 4 × 100-meter relay squad with Remegio Vista, Isaac Gomez and Claro Pellosis; all gold medalists in the 1958 Games. Onofre competing in the 4 × 100-meter relay won a gold medal in the 1962 Asian Games in Jakarta. A year after the games, he secured a Fulbright scholarship which enabled him to train and study in the United States. Onofre along with Vista, William Mordeno, Arnulfo Valles took part in the 4 × 100-meter relay at the 1966 Asian Games in Bangkok where they settled for bronze. His last major competition was the 1968 Summer Olympics in Mexico City where he competed in men's 100-meter and 110-meter hurdles; failing to progress from the preliminaries.

== Post-retirement and death ==
After retiring from athletics, Onofre settled in the United States living in San Francisco by 2021. He also has a granddaughter; Zion Corales Nelson who became an athlete like himself, who won a silver in the women's 4 × 100 meter relay in the 2019 Southeast Asian Games. In 2021, he was inducted to the Philippine Sports Hall of Fame.

Onofre died on 23 June 2025, at the age of 86.
