= Balkar Singh (disambiguation) =

Balkar Singh is a politician and MLA from Kartarpur.

Balkar Singh may also refer to:

- Balkar Singh Sidhu, Indian singer, politician and MLA from Rampura Phul
- Balkar Singh (athlete), Indian athlete from Punjab
