= Baruch Feinberg =

Israeli former Olympic javelin thrower

Personal information
- Nationality: Israel
- Born: ברוך פיינברג; August 6, 1933
- Died: May 17, 2007 (aged 73)
- Height: 182 cm (6 ft 0 in)
- Weight: 159 lb (72 kg)

Sport
- Sport: Athletics
- Event: Javelin throw

Achievements and titles
- Personal best: Javelin throw: 70.70 metres (1960)

Baruch Feinberg (Hebrew: ברוך פיינברג; August 6, 1933 – May 17, 2007) was an Israeli Olympic javelin thrower. When he competed in the Olympics, he was 182 cm in height, and weighed 159 lbs (72 kg).

== Javelin career ==
He was the Israeli champion in the javelin throw from 1962–66 and 1968-69. His personal best in the javelin throw is 70.70 (1960). He won the bronze medal at the 1958 Asian Games in the javelin, with a throw of 63.78, behind Pakistani throwers Jalal Khan and Muhammad Nawaz. He competed for Israel at the 1960 Summer Olympics in Rome, at the age of 27, in Athletics--Men's Javelin Throw, and came in 24th with a throw of 68.24.
