= Itokawa =

Itokawa (written: 糸川 lit. "thread river") is a Japanese surname. Notable people with the surname include:

- Hideo Itokawa (糸川 英夫, 1912–1999), Japanese rocket scientist
- Masaaki Itokawa (糸川 正晃, born 1974), Japanese politician of the People's New Party
- Teruo Itokawa (糸川 照雄, 1940–2000), Japanese shot putter
- Toshihiko Itokawa (糸川 敏彦, born 1974), Japanese speed skater

== See also ==
- 25143 Itokawa, an asteroid named after Hideo Itokawa
