= Philippine Sports Hall of Fame =

- Awarded for: Recognition of Filipino athletes and coaches for their contribution in Philippine sports
- Location: Metro Manila, Philippines
- Presented by: Philippine Sports Commission
- First award: May 10, 2010

The Philippine Sports Hall of Fame (PSHOF) is a hall of fame established in 1999 to honor Filipino athletes, trainers, and coaches with the first batch of inductees included in the hall of fame in 2010.

The Philippine Sports Commission manages the operations of the hall of fame.

== Background ==
The Philippine Sports Hall of Fame was established through legislation, particularly Republic Act No. 8757 which was signed into law on November 25, 1999 by then-President Joseph Estrada to "immortalize the Filipino Sports heritage" which were meant to serve as an inspiration to Filipinos. The first time Filipino athletes were inducted in the hall of fame was in 2010.

== Eligibility ==
By law, those eligible to be inducted to the Philippine Sports Hall of Fame must be Filipino athletes, coaches and trainers must satisfy at least one of these criteria:

- Won a gold medal in any SEA Games.
- Won at least a silver in the Asian Games, or any Asia-level or regional games.
- Bronze medalist in any Olympic Games or world-level competitions.
- World champion in any professional or amateur sports competition.

== Induction ceremonies ==
Year	Date	Venue	No. of Inductees	Ref.
2010	May 10, 2010	Manila Hotel, Manila	10	
2016	January 25, 2016	Century Park Hotel, Manila	17	
2018	November 22, 2018	Philippine International Convention Center, Pasay	10	
2021	July 18, 2021	N/A (virtual ceremony)	10	
2026	June 20, 2026	PSC House, Rizal Memorial Sports Complex, Manila	7	

== Inductees ==
=== 2010 ===
Inductee	Sport
Simeon Toribio	Athletics
Miguel White	Athletics
Carlos Loyzaga	Basketball
Ceferino Garcia	Boxing
Gabriel Elorde	Boxing
José Villanueva	Boxing
Pancho Villa	Boxing
Anthony Villanueva	Boxing
Teofilo Yldefonso	Swimming
1954 Philippine men's national team	Basketball

=== 2016 ===
Inductee	Sport
Inocencia Solis	Athletics
Isaac Gómez	Athletics
Mona Sulaiman	Athletics
Edgardo Ocampo	Basketball
Kurt Bachmann	Basketball
Mariano Tolentino	Basketball
Eugene Torre	Chess
Raymundo Deyro	Lawn tennis
Johnny Jose	Lawn tennis
Felicisimo Ampon	Lawn tennis
Adolfo Feliciano	Shooting
Martin Gison	Shooting
Gerardo Rosario	Swimming
Mohammad Mala	Swimming
Jacinto Cayco	Swimming
Haydee Coloso-Espino	Swimming
Salvador del Rosario	Weightlifting

=== 2018 ===
Inductee	Sport
Lydia De Vega	Athletics
Josephine dela Viña	Athletics
Filomeno Codiñera	Baseball / Softball
Loreto Carbonell	Basketball
Ambrosio Padilla	Basketball
Olivia Coo	Bowling
Lita dela Rosa	Bowling
Paeng Nepomuceno	Bowling
Erbito Salavarria	Boxing
Ben Arda	Golf

=== 2021 ===
Inductee	Sport
Rogelio Onofre	Athletics
Elma Muros-Posadas	Athletics
Dionisio Calvo	Basketball
Robert Jaworski	Basketball
Arianne Cerdeña	Bowling
Leopoldo Serantes	Boxing
Roel Velasco	Boxing
Paulino Alcántara	Football
Eric Buhain	Swimming
Gertrudes Lozada	Swimming

=== 2026 ===
Inductee	Sport
Ramon Fernandez	Basketball
Onyok Velasco	Boxing
Beatriz Lucero Lhuillier	Taekwondo / Gymnastics
Cecil Mamiit	Tennis
Adeline Dumapong	Para Powerlifting
Isidro del Prado	Athletics
Eduardo Pacheco	Basketball / Football
