= Reiko Ezoe =

Japanese sprinter

Personal information
- Nationality: Japanese
- Born: 20 June 1942 (age 83)

Sport
- Sport: Sprinting
- Event: 4 × 100 metres relay

Reiko Ezoe (江副 令子, Ezoe Reiko; born 20 June 1942) is a Japanese sprinter. She competed in the women's 4 × 100 metres relay at the 1964 Summer Olympics.
