= Park Hui-suk =

South Korean sprinter

Personal information
- Nationality: South Korean
- Born: 14 December 1945 (age 79)

Sport
- Sport: Sprinting
- Event: 4 × 100 metres relay

Park Hui-suk (born 14 December 1945) is a South Korean sprinter. She competed in the women's 4 × 100 metres relay at the 1964 Summer Olympics.
