= Saburo Yokomizo =

Japanese middle-distance runner (1939–2024)

Personal information
- Nationality: Japanese
- Born: 9 December 1939 Yokohama, Japan
- Died: 14 November 2024 (aged 84) Yokohama, Japan

Sport
- Sport: Middle-distance running
- Event: Steeplechase
Medal record
Representing Japan
Asian Games
Silver medal – second place	1962 Jakarta	3000m steeplechase
Silver medal – second place	1962 Jakarta	5000m
Summer Universiade
Silver medal – second place	1959 Turin	5000m

Saburo Yokomizo (横溝 三郎, Yokomizo Saburō; 9 December 1939 – 14 November 2024) was a Japanese middle-distance runner. He competed in the men's 3000 metres steeplechase at the 1964 Summer Olympics.

Yokomizo died from liver cancer on 14 November 2024, at the age of 84.
