= Claro Pellosis =

Filipino sprinter (1934–2019)

Personal information
- Nationality: Filipino
- Born: November 28, 1934 Minalabac, Camarines Sur, Philippine Commonwealth
- Died: July 21, 2019 (aged 84) Manila, Philippines
- Height: 5 ft 4 in (162 cm)
- Weight: 119 lb (54 kg)

Sport
- Sport: Sprinting
- Event: 400 metres
Medal record
Men's athletics
Representing Philippines
Asian Games
Gold medal – first place	1962 Jakarta	4×100m relay

Claro Pellosis (November 28, 1934 – July 21, 2019) was a Filipino sprinter. He competed in the men's 400 meters at the 1960 Summer Olympics.

Pellosis, despite being more reputed in the 400 meters event, was part of the 4×100 meters relay team that won the gold medal for the Philippines at the 1962 Asian Games. He along with his teammates Rogelio Onofre, Isaac Gómez, and Remegio Vista, were the second and last people to win a 4×100 meters relay event for the Philippines in the Asian Games.

He was also an athletics instructor to students and Physical Education teachers. He also helped national athlete Lydia de Vega win the women's 100 meters events at the 1986 Asian Games by assisting her father and coach Tatang de Vega. He assisted Tatang de Vega until the retirement of the latter's daughter in 1994.

By 2003, Pellosis was already a director of athletics events. In the same year his house in Paco, Manila was burned in a fire.

On July 21, 2019, Pellosis died after suffering a cardiac arrest while having lunch with his family. He was rushed to the Manila Doctors Hospital where attempts to revive him were unsuccessful.
