= Loretta Barcenas =

Filipino sprinter

Personal information
- Nationality: Filipino
- Born: December 19, 1942 (age 83)

Sport
- Sport: Sprinting
- Event: 4 × 100 metres relay

Loretta A. Barcenas (born December 19, 1942) is a Filipino sprinter. She competed in the women's 4 × 100 metres relay at the 1964 Summer Olympics.
