= Nelly Restar =

Filipino sprinter (1939–2021)

Personal information
- Nationality: Filipino
- Born: December 16, 1939
- Died: August 22, 2021 (aged 81) Aklan, Philippines
- Height: 5 ft 2 in (158 cm)
- Weight: 104 lb (47 kg)

Sport
- Sport: Sprinting
- Event(s): 4×100 m relay, 80 m hurdles
- College team: CIT Amazons

Nelly R. Restar-Gonzales (December 16, 1939 – August 22, 2021) was a Filipino sprinter. She competed in the women's 4 × 100 metres relay at the 1964 Summer Olympics. She also competed in the now defunct 80-meter hurdles. She placed fifth in the said the event during the 1966 Asian Games in Bangkok.

She is a member of the Amazons track and field team of the Cebu Institute of Technology (CIT) in the 1960s. During this time most member of the Philippine track and field team came from CIT.

Restar retired from track and field in 1968, and got married the following year. She worked as a librarian at CIT and later returned to her home province of Aklan to work as a public school teacher.

In April 2021, she experienced a stroke leaving her bedridden. She was rushed to a hospital in Aklan on August 22, 2021, but died due to a heart disease.
