= Hari Singh Thapa =

Indian boxer

Personal information
- Native name: हरि सिंह थापा
- National team: India
- Born: August 14, 1932 Jhansi, United Provinces of Agra and Oudh, British India (present day Jhansi, Uttar Pradesh, India)
- Died: February 7, 2021 (aged 88) Naini-Saini, Pithoragarh district, Uttarakhand, India
- Weight: 75 kg (165 lb) (1950-1959)

Sport
- Sport: Boxing
Medal record
Men's boxing
Representing India
Asian Games
Silver medal – second place	1958 Tokyo	Men's 75 kg
South-East Asian Boxing Championships
Gold medal – first place	1957 Rangoon	Men's 75 kg

Hari Singh Thapa (14 August 1932 – 7 February 2021), also known as Hari Singh, was an Indian boxer, who won a silver medal in men's 75 kg at the 1958 Asian Games. He defeated Leon Khachatourian by points in the semifinals, before losing by points to Chang Lo-pu in the final.

He was the Indian national boxing champion in men's 75 kg in 1950, 1954 and 1959. He won a gold medal in men's 75 kg at the South-East Asian Boxing Championships in 1957, held in Rangoon, by defeating Tin O of Burma in the final.

He also competed at the 1958 British Empire and Commonwealth Games, knocking out Glyn Waters of Wales in the preliminary round. However, he could not play further due to an injury sustained during practice, and conceded a walkover to Terry Milligan in the quarterfinals.

He died on 7 February 2021 at the age of 88.
