= Tsai Cheng-fu =

Taiwanese hurdler (1929–2016)

Tsai Cheng-fu (Chinese: 蔡程福; pinyin: Cài Chéngfú; 14 October 1929 – 13 July 2016) was a Taiwanese hurdler who competed in the 1956 Summer Olympics. He was also the 400 metres hurdles champion at the 1958 Asian Games.
