= Budhial =

Village in Talagang District, Punjab, Pakistan

- بڈھیال
- Location in Pakistan
- Coordinates: 32°59′0″N 72°11′0″E
- Country: Pakistan
- Province: Punjab
- District: Talagang

Population (2017 Pakistani census)
  - Total: 4,001
- Time zone: UTC+5 (PST)
  - Summer (DST): +5

Budhial is a village and union council of Talagang District in the Punjab Province of Pakistan. It used to be in the 'old Tehsil' of old Chakwal District in 2008.

Budhial village is located about 25 km (16 mi) southwest of Talagang.

== History ==
Budhial is located on Talagang-Multan Khurd Highway. It is linked to CPEC through Tarap Interchange. It is 22 km from Tarap Interchange. Budhial as a settled town has existed since 1500 AD. Budhial is a historical village in Talagang tehsil. It is located about 20 km from Talgang town on the Talagang-Tamman road. The village was founded by Budha Khan in the first quarter of the 16th century and was located on Kiran Wali Dheri on the northern side of Ankar Nala. Budha Khan belonged to the Rehan lineage of the Awan tribe. Later the grandsons of Budha Khan – Agar Khan, Amant Khan, Fateh Khan and Bamli Khan – moved from Kiran Wali Dheri to found the present Budhial village. The descendants of Budha Khan are known as Budhial and are divided into different lineages: Agral, who trace their ancestry from Agar Khan; Mantal, who are descendants of Amant Khan; Phatial, who trace their ancestry from Fateh Khan; and Bamlial, the descendants of Bamli Khan. Bamlials are further divided into two main lineages: Salhal who trace their ancestry from Muhammad Saleh and Mial the descendants of Mian Inayat son of Mian Muhammad Aqil who was the grandson of Bamli Khan.

== Demographic ==
It has a population of 4,001 people per 2017 Pakistani census. Most of Budhial's population are different clans of the Awans including Agral, Phirwal, Phatial and Musbal. Phirwal is the largest clan of the area.

== Infrastructure ==
Budhial is one of the developed villages of the area with very high rate of literacy and center of Rihan Region / Budhial union council.

== Amenities ==
It has electricity, natural gas, land line telephones, internet facilities.

== Hotels ==
Budhial is famous for various hotels it has. Shan-E-Awan Hotel, Bismillah Hotel, Angara Hotel are few examples.

== Surrounding areas ==
Other villages near Budhial are Patwali, Misrial and Tamman. There are vast lands, small hills, a plateau around Budhial. Budhial has separate high schools for both boys and girls, a madrassah for boys and a madrassah for girls where girls and boys from Budhial and nearby villages are getting education.

== Health ==
Budhial has Basic Health Unit and various private medical clinics. a veterinary hospital exists for household animals.

== Professions ==
Joining military service is most common and traditional profession. Agriculture farming is other common profession.

== Population trends ==
Large number of families have settled to nearby towns of Rawalpindi, Islamabad for better education, health and job opportunities.

== Sports ==
Sports played in Budhial include Gulli Danda, Pithu Garam, Chuppan Chuppai, Kabbadi, Cricket and Shooting Ball (a local variant of volleyball).

== Tourism ==
The landscape of Budhial is scenic and a stream flows near the village which is known as Ankar.

Ankar once used to be a useful water resource but with the advent and introduction of technology, it is not used for this purpose anymore. Village has two water ponds known as Ban and Chapur. And a beautiful cave complex Anhara Dobak is also located nearby.

== Shrines ==
There is a mausoleum of Bibi Rabia near the main graveyard of Budhial. Bibi Rabia is very famous Wali (Sufi). People from this village and nearby villages visit her mausoleum daily.

- Village also has a post office, basic health center & veterinary hospital.

== Famous persons ==
The village is the hometown of Captain Muhammad Nawaz, two-times Asian Champion in javelin throw and a Pride of Performance award winner by the President of Pakistan in 1966. A gate of Liaquat Gymnasium, Islamabad has been named after him as Nawaz Gate.

== Public demands ==
There is a requirement to establish a college in the town. There is a requirement of a public library in the town.

== Education ==
Budhial has a government high school with separate campuses for boys and girls.
