= Muhammad Ayub (athlete) =

Pakistani discus thrower and shot putter

Personal information
- Nationality: Pakistani
- Born: 2 February 1932 Baral, District Jhelum, Punjab
- Died: 19 October 2008
- Occupation: Athlete

Sport
- Country: Pakistan
- Sport: Discus throw, Shot put

Achievements and titles
- Personal best: Discus throw: 48 m (1967)
Medal record
Men's athletics
Representing Pakistan
Asian Games
Silver medal – second place	1958 Tokyo	Discus throw

Muhammad Ayub (1932–2008) was a Pakistani track and field athlete who competed in the discus throw event at the 1956 Summer Olympics. He won the silver medal in discus throw event at the 1958 Asian Games. He was also an officer in Pakistan Army, participated in 1965 war and received a Medal.

He also competed in the discus throw events at three British Empire and Commonwealth Games, finishing ninth in 1958, tenth in 1962, and twelfth in 1966. His personal best throw in the discus was 48.00 metres, achieved in 1967.

== Career ==
From 1952 to 1978 Ayub represented Pakistan. In 1970, 1972 and 1973 he participated in national Championships and won gold medals in discus throw. During this period, he was also the Athletics Coach of Pakistan Sports Control Board. Afterwards he remained a coach for POF Athletic Team and served in B-20 POF Weapons Factory from 1979 to 1990. He died on 19 October 2008.

=== Participation ===
International Events
Year	Event	Achievement
1954	Asian Games, Manila	Participated
1956	Olympic Games, Melbourne	19th (44.88 m); Eliminated in qualifying round
1956	First Indo-Pak Athletic Meet, New Delhi	Participated
1957	International Meet, Tehran	Participated
1958	International Discus Championship, Hong Kong	Participated
1958	Asian Games, Tokyo	2nd (46.01 m)
1958	Commonwealth Games, Cardiff	9th
1962	Commonwealth Games, Perth	10th
1962	Malaysian Open	Participated
1966	Commonwealth Games, Jamaica	12th
1966	International Discus Championship, Daun	Participated

National Events
Year	Event	Achievement
1954	National Athletic Championship	Participated
1956	National Games	Participated
1967	National Championship	Participated
1969	National Athletics Championship	Participated
1973	Punjab Athletics Championship	Participated

== See also ==
- List of Pakistani records in athletics
- Athletics in Pakistan
- Pakistan at the Olympics
