= Tibiao =

Municipality in Antique, Philippines

- Municipality
- Municipality of Tibiao
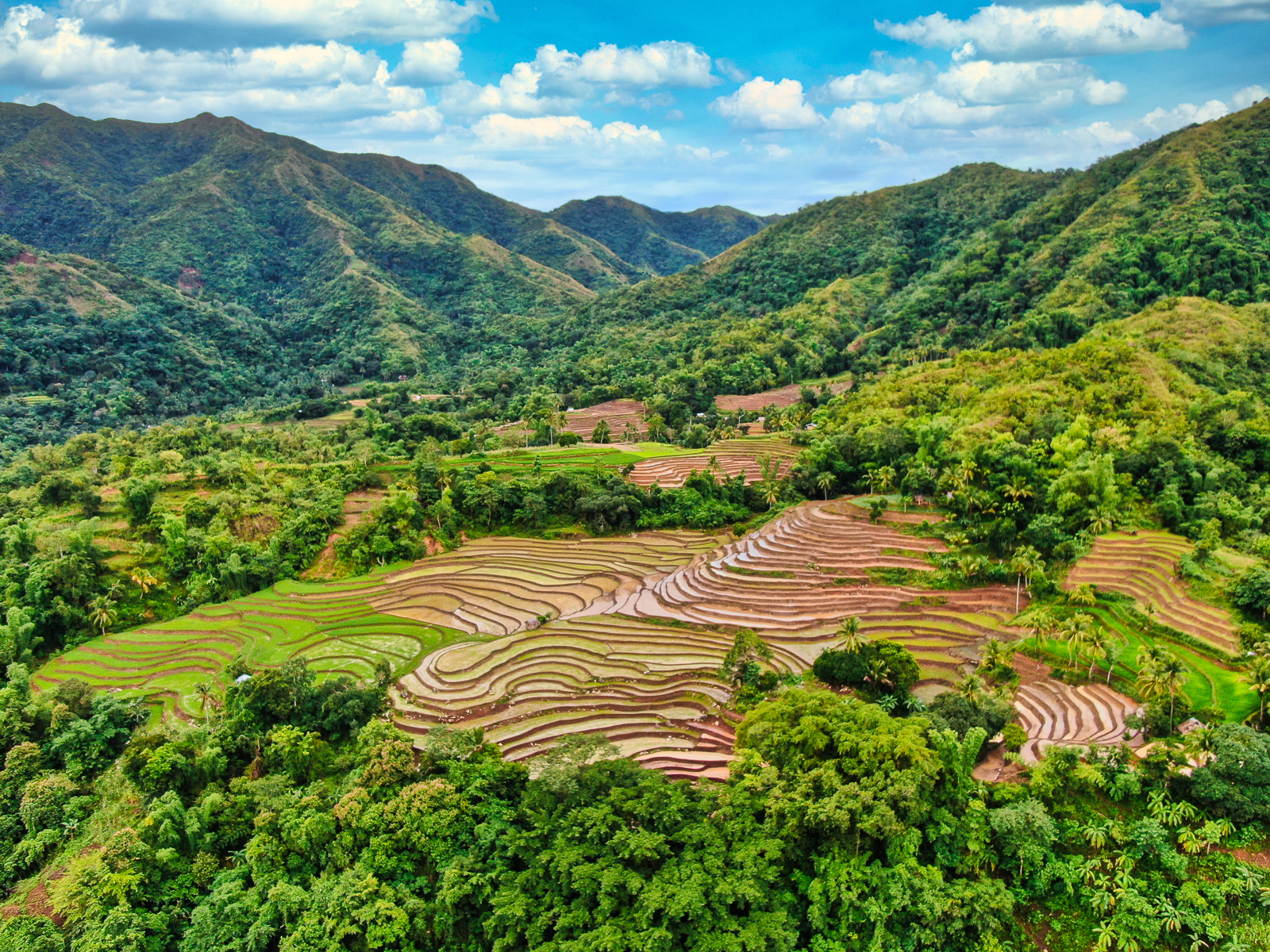
- Tibiao Rice Terraces

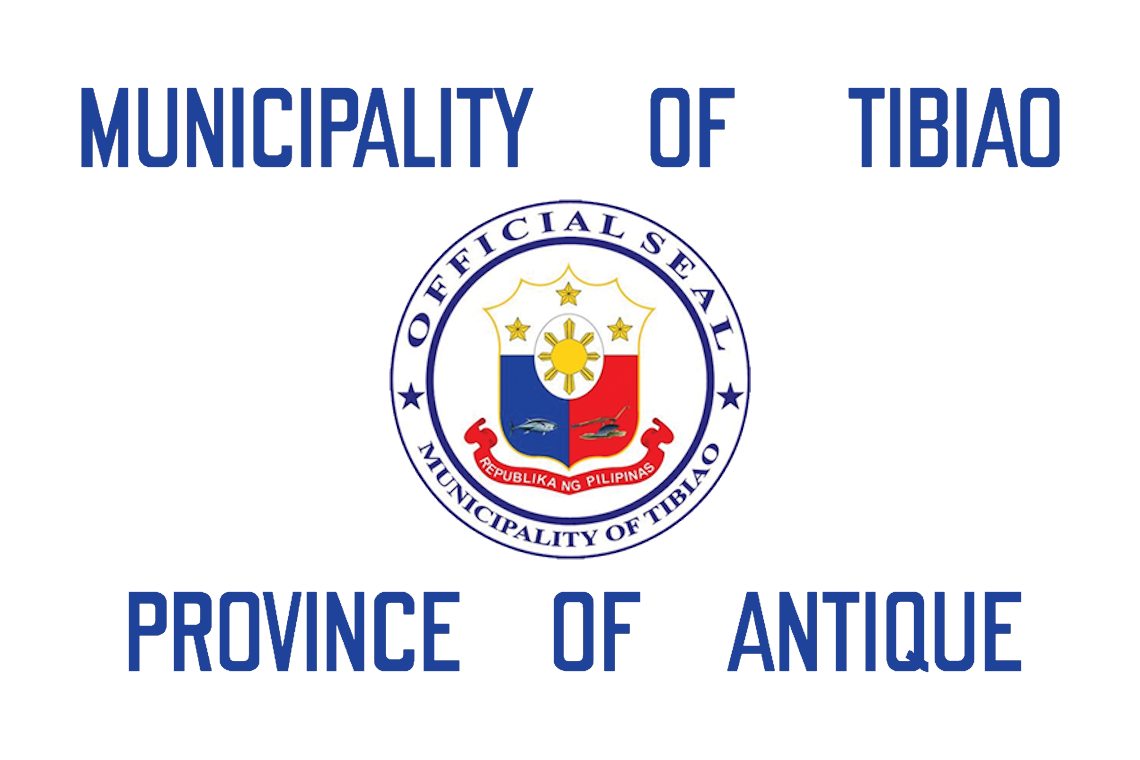
- Flag

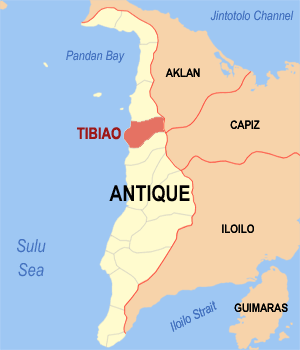
- Map of Antique with Tibiao highlighted
- Interactive map of Tibiao
- Location within the Philippines
- Coordinates: 11°17′21″N 122°02′03″E
- Country: Philippines
- Region: Western Visayas
- Province: Antique
- District: Lone district
- Barangays: 21 (see Barangays)

Government
  - Type: Sangguniang Bayan
  - Mayor: Klemens G. Bandoja
  - Vice Mayor: Jimmy D. Barrientos
  - Representative: Anthony Agapito B. Legarda
  - Municipal Council: Members: Gil B. Bandoja; Cheng M. Modesto; Lucas F. Bandoja Jr.; Amador M. Cumla; Randy G. Buenafe; Fred F. Eraga; Pelver Y. Medina; Xz G. Lim
  - Electorate: 18,305 voters (2025)

Area
  - Total: 177.42 km^{2} (68.50 sq mi)
- Elevation: 92 m (302 ft)
- Highest elevation (Mount Banderahan): 590 m (1,940 ft)
- Lowest elevation: 0 m (0 ft)

Population (2024 census)
  - Total: 29,608
  - Density: 166.88/km^{2} (432.22/sq mi)
  - Households: 6,925

Economy
  - Income class: 2nd municipal income class
  - Poverty incidence: 19.76% (2023)
  - Revenue: ₱ 173.8 million (2024)
  - Assets: ₱ 444.2 million (2024)
  - Expenditure: ₱ 55.69 million (2024)
  - Liabilities: ₱ 106.4 million (2024)

Service provider
  - Electricity: Antique Electric Cooperative (ANTECO)
- Time zone: UTC+8 (PST)
- ZIP code: 5707
- PSGC: 060617000
- IDD : area code: +63 (0)36
- Native languages: Karay-a; Hiligaynon; Tagalog
- Website: tibiaoantique.gov.ph

Tibiao, officially the Municipality of Tibiao (Kinaray-a: Banwa kang Tibiao; Hiligaynon: Banwa sang Tibiao; Tagalog: Bayan ng Tibiao), is a municipality in the province of Antique, Philippines. According to the 2024 census, it has a population of 29,608 people.

== Geography ==
Tibiao is located 75 kilometres (47 mi) from the provincial capital of Antique, San Jose de Buenavista.

According to the Philippine Statistics Authority, the municipality has a land area of 177.42 square kilometres (68.50 sq mi) constituting 6.50% of the 2,729.17-square-kilometre- (1,053.74 sq mi) total area of Antique.

Seco Island, over 21 nautical miles offshore, is a 1.5 km sandbar visited by tourists.

=== Climate ===
Climate data for Tibiao, Antique
Month	Jan	Feb	Mar	Apr	May	Jun	Jul	Aug	Sep	Oct	Nov	Dec	Year
Mean daily maximum °C (°F)	29 (84)	30 (86)	31 (88)	33 (91)	32 (90)	30 (86)	29 (84)	29 (84)	29 (84)	29 (84)	29 (84)	29 (84)	30 (86)
Mean daily minimum °C (°F)	22 (72)	22 (72)	22 (72)	24 (75)	25 (77)	25 (77)	25 (77)	25 (77)	25 (77)	24 (75)	24 (75)	23 (73)	24 (75)
Average precipitation mm (inches)	64 (2.5)	44 (1.7)	58 (2.3)	83 (3.3)	204 (8.0)	304 (12.0)	334 (13.1)	291 (11.5)	310 (12.2)	281 (11.1)	172 (6.8)	97 (3.8)	2,242 (88.3)
Average rainy days	12.5	8.9	11.3	14.1	24.2	28.0	29.6	28.2	28.1	28.1	20.2	15.2	248.4
Source: Meteoblue

=== Barangays ===
Tibiao is politically subdivided into 21 barangays. Each barangay consists of puroks and some have sitios.

PSGC	Barangay	Population			±% p.a.	
		2024		2010		
060617001	Alegre (Lawihaw)	0.9%	280	268	▴	0.30%
060617002	Amar (Sangyadan)	3.5%	1,025	857	▴	1.24%
060617003	Bandoja (Lupa-an)	2.1%	618	627	▾	−0.10%
060617004	Castillo (Igtonarum)	0.6%	182	152	▴	1.25%
060617005	Esparagoza (Ungyon)	1.4%	414	507	▾	−1.38%
060617006	Importante (Balantian)	4.5%	1,322	1,086	▴	1.36%
060617007	La Paz (Langawon)	4.4%	1,316	1,258	▴	0.31%
060617008	Malabor (Burok Burok)	12.2%	3,602	2,739	▴	1.90%
060617009	Martinez (Lamnugan)	6.4%	1,896	1,891	▴	0.02%
060617010	Natividad (Kulangi)	3.1%	921	718	▴	1.73%
060617011	Pitac (San Dionisio)	4.1%	1,228	1,264	▾	−0.20%
060617012	Poblacion	13.0%	3,850	3,624	▴	0.42%
060617013	Salazar (Mamara/Hinonghinong)	2.0%	585	567	▴	0.22%
060617014	San Francisco Norte (Tumangtang)	5.7%	1,690	1,519	▴	0.74%
060617015	San Francisco Sur (Butarog)	6.0%	1,776	1,537	▴	1.00%
060617016	San Isidro (Gingay)	3.8%	1,126	1,075	▴	0.32%
060617017	Santa Ana (Payatpat)	2.0%	598	593	▴	0.06%
060617018	Santa Justa (Kubay)	4.6%	1,365	1,351	▴	0.07%
060617019	Santo Rosario (Karapunan)	3.6%	1,061	1,042	▴	0.12%
060617020	Tigbaboy	1.3%	379	336	▴	0.83%
060617021	Tuno	5.1%	1,514	1,502	▴	0.05%
	Total		29,608	24,513	▴	1.31%

== Demographics ==
Population census of Tibiao
Year	Pop.	±% p.a.
1903	7,482	—
1918	8,989	+1.23%
1939	10,830	+0.89%
1948	13,321	+2.33%
1960	11,879	−0.95%
1970	14,280	+1.86%
1975	15,935	+2.22%
1980	17,200	+1.54%
1990	20,192	+1.62%
1995	19,628	−0.53%
2000	21,772	+2.25%
2007	23,228	+0.90%
2010	24,513	+1.98%
2015	26,748	+1.68%
2020	28,703	+1.50%
2024	29,608	+0.75%
Source: Philippine Statistics Authority

In the 2024 census, Tibiao had a population of 29,608 people. The population density was 170 inhabitants per square kilometre (440/sq mi).

== Economy ==
Poverty incidence of Tibiao (%)

Source: Philippine Statistics Authority

== Tourism ==
Tibiao is dubbed the Eco-Adventure Capital of Panay Island. It offers various adventure activities such as trekking to Bugtong Bato Fall, kayaking and river tubing in Tibiao River, and cultural immersion tour to Antique Rice Terraces. The Antique Rice Terraces is a recently rediscovered heritage attraction in the town of San Remigios. The rice terraces covers 600 hectares and it is preserved by the Iraynon Bukidnon, an indigenous group in Barangay General Fullon.

== Education ==
The Tibiao Schools District Office governs all educational institutions within the municipality. It oversees the management and operations of all private and public, from primary to secondary schools.

=== Primary and elementary schools ===
- Amar Elementary School
- Apfemtava "Igputoy" Satellite School Annex of Tuno
- Bandoja Primary School
- Esparagoza Elementary School
- Importante Elementary School
- Malabor Baptist Christian Academy
- Malabor Elementary School
- Maranatha Chistian Academy
- Martinez Elementary School
- Nonghinong Elementary School
- Our Lady of Guadalupe Tibiao Parochial School
- Pitac Elementary School
- San Francisco Norte Elementary School
- San Francisco Sur Elementary School
- San Isidro Primary School
- St. Nicholas Learning Center
- Sta. Justa Elementary School
- Sto. Rosario Elementary School
- Tibiao Central School
- Tigbaboy Primary School
- Tuno Elementary School

=== Secondary schools ===
- La Paz Integrated School
- St. Nicholas Parish Institute
- Sta. Justa National High School
- Tario Lim National Memorial High School
- Treynald Tom Sy Academy
- University of Antique (Junior and Senior High School)

=== Higher educational institution ===
- University of Antique (Tario Lim Memorial Campus)

== Notable personalities ==
- Alfredo Siojo Lim, former Senator and former Mayor of City of Manila. He is the son of Quintin Tario Lim Sr.
- Remegio Vicente Vista, a Filipino Sprinter Representative of his own country, Gold Medalist in Jakarta, the Tokyo Asian Games and Mexico Summer Olympics. He dubbed as the fastest man in Asia during his time. Born in a depressed mountain barangay of Salazar, Tibiao, Antique.
