= Takako Inoguchi =

Japanese sprinter

Personal information
- Nationality: Japanese
- Born: 4 February 1942 (age 83)

Sport
- Sport: Sprinting
- Event: 4 × 100 metres relay

Takako Inoguchi (井口 任子, Inoguchi Takako; born 4 February 1942) is a Japanese sprinter. She competed in the women's 4 × 100 metres relay at the 1964 Summer Olympics.
