= Makhan Singh (sprinter) =

Indian sprinter

Personal information
- Full name: Makhan Singh
- Born: 1 July 1937 Bathulla, British India
- Died: 21 January 2002 (aged 64) Chabbewal, India

Sport
- Country: India
Medal record
Sprint
Representing India
Asian Games
| Gold medal – first place | 1962 Jakarta | 4×400 m relay |
| Silver medal – second place | 1962 Jakarta | 400 m |
National Games of India
| Gold medal – first place | 12 |
| Silver medal – second place | 3 |
| Bronze medal – third place | 1 |

Makhan Singh (1 July 1937 – 21 January 2002) was an Indian track and field athlete during the 1960s. He was born in Bathulla village in the Hoshiarpur district of Punjab. His primary claim to fame came was his victory over Milkha Singh in the 1964 National Games of India in Calcutta. He won a number of gold medals in National Games, and represented India in the 1962 Asian Games and the 1964 Summer Olympics.

== Career ==
His first taste of success was a bronze in the National Games held in Cuttack in 1959. He then hit the high spots with the National Games in Delhi the following year when he won a gold in the short sprint and a silver in the 300 metres. He was to continue with this success in subsequent National Games, winning a gold and a silver at Madras in 1960, four golds at Jabalpur in 1962 and two golds and one silver at Trivandrurn in 1963. His greatest triumph was the 1964 National Games in Calcutta where he beat Milkha Singh by 47.5 seconds to 47.9 seconds in the 400 metres. He picked up four gold medals in that nationals. He represented India in the 1962 Asian Games in Jakarta where he won a relay gold in 4 x 400 metres and a silver in the 400 metres.

For Makhan Singh, the artillery gunner, the National Games had special significance. He took part in all the Games from 1959 to 1964 and won a total of 12 golds, three silvers and one bronze, the last one in Calcutta where he signed off being his most outing.

He was a Subedar in the Indian Army and retired in 1972. After retirement from the army he started a stationery shop in his village. He was diabetic and in 1990 his foot was injured by a piece of glass so doctors suggested cutting off his leg. He died in penury in 2002. He also won the Arjuna Award in 1964 for his achievements.
