= Ryuko Hirano =

Japanese athlete

Personal information
- Nationality: Japanese

Sport
- Country: Japan
- Sport: Athletics
Medal record
Women's athletics
Representing Japan
Asian Games
Silver medal – second place	1962 Jakarta	800 m

Ryuko Hirano is a Japanese athlete. She won the silver medal in the 800 metres event in the 1962 Asian Games.
