= Preya Dechdumrong =

Thai sprinter

Personal information
- Nationality: Thai
- Born: 24 January 1945 (age 80)

Sport
- Sport: Sprinting
- Event: 4 × 100 metres relay

Preya Dechdumrong (born 24 January 1945) is a Thai sprinter. She competed in the women's 4 × 100 metres relay at the 1964 Summer Olympics.
