= Muhammad Yousaf (athlete) =

Pakistani long-distance runner (born 1938)

Personal information
- Nationality: Pakistani
- Born: 10 January 1938
- Height: 179 cm (5 ft 10 in)
- Weight: 70 kg (154 lb; 11 st 0 lb)

Sport
- Sport: Long-distance running
- Event: Marathon
Medal record
Men's athletics
Representing Pakistan
Asian Games
Silver medal – second place	1962 Jakarta	Marathon

Muhammad Yousaf (born 10 January 1938) was a Pakistani long-distance runner. He competed in the marathon at the 1964 Summer Olympics. He won the silver medal in the marathon at the 1962 Asian Games.

== See also ==
- List of Pakistani records in athletics
- Athletics in Pakistan
- Pakistan at the Olympics
