= Mubarak Shah (athlete) =

Pakistani long distance runner (1930–2001)

Personal information
- Nationality: Pakistani
- Born: 24 June 1930 Dhoke Budhal, Punjab
- Died: 19 January 2001 (aged 70) Rawalpindi, Punjab

Sport
- Country: Pakistan
- Sport: Athletics
- Event: long-distance running
Medal record
Men's athletics
Representing Pakistan
Asian Games
Gold medal – first place	1962 Jakarta	3000 m Steeplechase
Gold medal – first place	1962 Jakarta	5000 m
Gold medal – first place	1958 Tokyo	3000 m Steeplechase
Silver medal – second place	1958 Tokyo	10,000 m

Mubarak Shah (Urdu: مبارک شاہ; 24 June 1930 – 19 January 2001) was a Pakistani long-distance runner who competed in the 1960 Summer Olympics. He was a three-time Asian Games gold medallist. Shah won two of those gold medals at the 4th Asian Games held in Jakarta, Indonesia in 1962, in the 3000 m steeplechase and 5000 m, setting new Asian Games record times in both.

== Early and personal life ==
Shah was born in 1930 in the Rawalpindi district of the Punjab province of British India.

Like many of the early athletes in Pakistan history, Shah served in the Pakistan Army.

== Career ==
In the 1958 Asian Games held in Tokyo, Shah won the 3000 metres steeplechase and was placed second in the 10,000 metres.

In the 1962 Asian Games held in Jakarta, Shah retained his 3000 meters steeplechase title in a record time of 8 minutes 57.8 seconds. Switching from 10000 meters to the shorter distance of 5000 metres, Shah also achieved gold medal in the event, setting a new competition record of 14 minutes and 27.2 seconds.

== Awards ==
Ribbon	Decoration	Country	Year
	Pride of Performance	Pakistan	1963

Mubarak Shah was awarded the Pride of Performance Award in 1963 in recognition of his outstanding achievements and contributions to athletics.

== See also ==
- List of Pakistani records in athletics
- Athletics in Pakistan
- Pakistan at the Olympics
