= Ikuko Yoda =

Japanese hurdler and sprinter

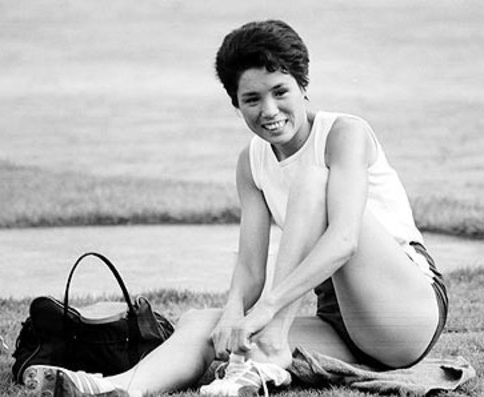
- Ikuko Yoda at the 1964 Olympics

Personal information
- Born: 30 September 1938 Nagano, Japan
- Died: 14 October 1983 (aged 45) Tokyo, Japan
- Height: 1.65 m (5 ft 5 in)
- Weight: 50 kg (110 lb)

Sport
- Sport: Sprint running, hurdles
Medal record
Representing Japan
Asian Games
Gold medal – first place	1958 Tokyo	4×100 m
Gold medal – first place	1962 Jakarta	80 m hurdles
Silver medal – second place	1962 Jakarta	100 m
Silver medal – second place	1962 Jakarta	4×100 m

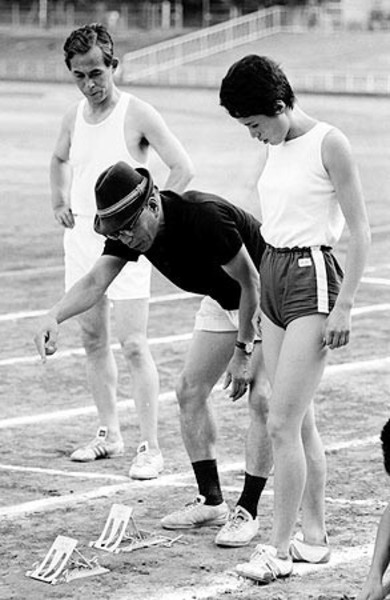
Yoda with Naoto Tajima and Takayoshi Yoshioka

Ikuko Yoda (依田 郁子, Yoda Ikuko; 30 September 1938 – 14 October 1983) was a Japanese sprinter who competed at the 1964 Summer Olympics.

== Biography ==
Yoda finished second behind Pat Nutting in the 80 metres hurdles event at the British 1963 WAAA Championships and 1964 WAAA Championships.

At the 1964 Olympic Games in Tokyo, Yoda competed in the 80 metres hurdles and 4 × 100 metres relay events and finished fifth in the hurdles, setting her personal best at 10.7 seconds.

Yoda retired shortly after the 1964 Olympics. She committed suicide by hanging at the age of 45. She had previously attempted suicide in 1960, after failing to qualify for the 1960 Olympics.
