= Lydia de Vega =

Filipina athlete (1964–2022)

Personal information
- Full name: Maria Lydia de Vega
- Nickname: Diay
- Born: December 26, 1964 Meycauayan, Bulacan, Philippines
- Died: August 10, 2022 (aged 57) Makati, Philippines
- Spouse: Paul Mercado (after 1990)
- Life partner: Jacter Singh
- Children: 3 (with Mercado)

Member of the Meycauayan Municipal Council
- In office June 30, 2001 – June 30, 2004

Sport
- Country: Philippines
- Sport: Track and field
- Events: 100m, 200m, 400m, long jump
- College team: FEU Tamaraws
- Coached by: Francisco de Vega; Claro Pellosis
- Retired: 1994
Medal record
Event	1st	2nd	3rd
Asian Athletics Championships	4	3	3
Asian Games	2	1	-
Southeast Asian Games	9	2	-
Total	15	6	3
Women's athletics
Representing Philippines
Asian Games
Gold medal – first place	1982 New Delhi	100m
Gold medal – first place	1986 Seoul	100m
Silver medal – second place	1986 Seoul	200m
Asian Championships
Gold medal – first place	1983 Kuwait City	100m
Gold medal – first place	1983 Kuwait City	200m
Gold medal – first place	1987 Singapore	100m
Gold medal – first place	1987 Singapore	200m
Silver medal – second place	1981 Tokyo	400m
Silver medal – second place	1981 Tokyo	4×400 m
Silver medal – second place	1983 Kuwait City	400m
Bronze medal – third place	1979 Tokyo	4×400 m
Bronze medal – third place	1981 Tokyo	200m
Bronze medal – third place	1985 Jakarta	100m
Southeast Asian Games
Gold medal – first place	1981 Manila	200m
Gold medal – first place	1981 Manila	400m
Gold medal – first place	1983 Singapore	200m
Gold medal – first place	1987 Jakarta	100m
Gold medal – first place	1987 Jakarta	200m
Gold medal – first place	1987 Jakarta	Long Jump
Gold medal – first place	1991 Manila	100m
Gold medal – first place	1993 Singapore	100m
Gold medal – first place	1993 Singapore	200m
Silver medal – second place	1983 Singapore	100m
Silver medal – second place	1991 Manila	200m

Maria Lydia de Vega-Mercado (Tagalog: [lɪdiˈjɐ dɛ ˈbɛga mɛɾˈkadɔ]; December 26, 1964 – August 10, 2022) was a Filipina athlete who was considered Asia's fastest woman in the 1980s.

== Athletic career ==
De Vega was discovered in the Palarong Pambansa (transl. national games) in the 1970s, and was recruited to be a part of Far Eastern University Tamaraws varsity track team. She then became a member of the Gintong Alay track and field program. She was coached by her father Francisco "Tatang" de Vega who was assisted by Claro Pellosis. Santos Magno and Anthony Benson later joined her training staff.

De Vega first made an impact at the 1981 Southeast Asian Games (SEA Games) held in Manila with gold medal performances in the 200 and 400 meter events exceeding records set at the Asian Games.

In 1982, de Vega starred as herself in a film based on her own life titled Medalyang Ginto (lit. 'gold medal'), directed by Romy Suzara and written by novelist Edgardo M. Reyes. She signed a contract in the presence of 27-year-old Philippine Olympic Committee president Michael Marcos Keon, and received ₱35,000 for starring in the film.

As Asia's sprint queen, she ran away with the gold medal in the 100-meter dash in the 1982 Asian Games in New Delhi and duplicated the feat in the same event at the 1986 edition in Seoul where she clocked 11.53 seconds. She developed a rivalry with Indian athlete P. T. Usha.

De Vega won the gold in the 100 meters at the SEA Games (1987, 1991 and 1993). She also topped the 200 meter event in 1981, 1983, 1987 and 1993. She has twice won both the 100 and 200 meter golds in the Asian Athletics Championships – 1983 and 1987. As a 16-year old in the 1981 edition, she placed second in the 400 meter run and also bagged the bronze medal in the 200 meters.

De Vega was a two-time Olympian, represented the Philippines at the 1984 and 1988 Summer Olympics.

She also brought home a silver medal in the 200-meter race from the 1986 Seoul Asiad, and has once represented a friend for the Long Jumps and broke her record.

In 1989 until 1991, De Vega took a break from athletics. During this period she got an academic degree and got married. She entered the 1991 Asian Athletics Championships and made a decent finish of seventh place.

De Vega retired after competing at the track and field event of the 1994 Manila-Fujian Games held in October. She won the 100m event. She announced that she would not be competing at the upcoming edition of the Philippine National Games at that time. She retired from her athletic career in 1994.

== Later life and death ==
De Vega was elected as councilor of her native Meycauayan town in Bulacan province in 2001. In early 2005, she was appointed a liaison officer of the Alliance of Coaches and Athletes of the Philippines with the Philippine Sports Commission.

In December 2005, De Vega went to Singapore after receiving three job offers from Singaporean private schools to handle athletics. She coached young athletes in Singapore.

In 2018, De Vega was diagnosed with stage 4 breast cancer. Over the next four years she underwent several procedures including a brain surgery.

She was one of the flag bearers of the official SEA Games flag at the opening ceremony of the 2019 Southeast Asian Games in the Philippines.

In July 2022, De Vega was reportedly "in critical condition". She died on August 10, 2022, after battling cancer while hospitalized at the Makati Medical Center.

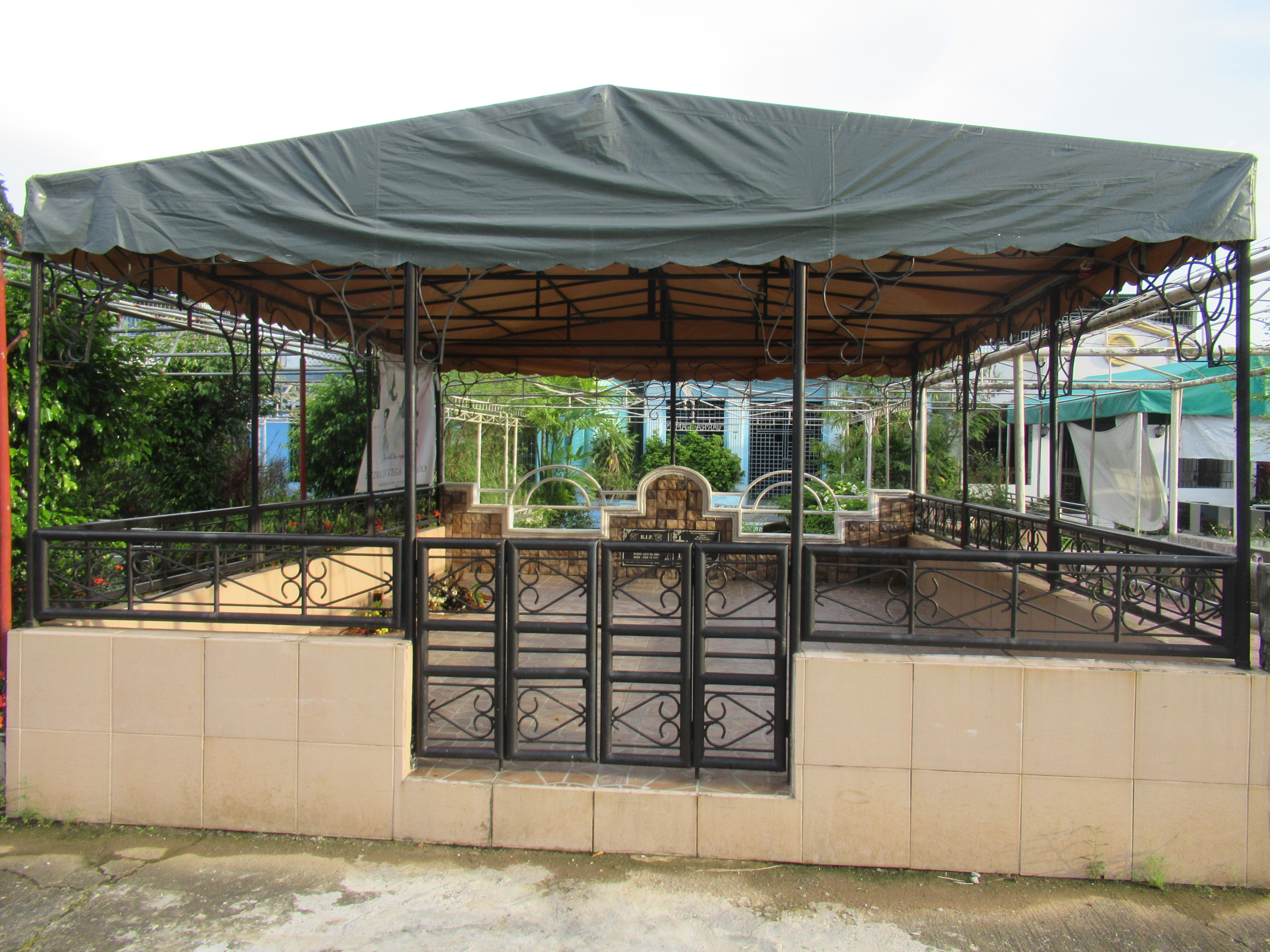
De Vega's family mausoleum at Pandayan, Meycauayan Cemetery.

== Personal life ==
De Vega's father was Francisco "Tatang" De Vega, Sr. (August 13, 1928 – December 26, 2010), who was also her coach. Singaporean athlete Jacter Singh was her long-time partner. They first met at the 1979 Asean Schools Track and Field Championships in Singapore and were together for six years prior to both of them entering separate marriages.

De Vega would marry another man named Paul Mercado in 1990, a former engineer at Meralco and an entrepreneur engaged in the fish pond business, with whom she had three children, including Stephanie (Paneng), who is a former collegiate volleyball player of the DLSU Lady Spikers. On February 13, 2001, her four-year-old son John Michael (JM) (October 31, 1996 – February 13, 2001) died in a car accident.

De Vega ended her marriage with Mercado. Singh divorced his wife the same year. De Vega and Singh would then restart their relationship.

== Honors and awards ==
The Far Eastern University inducted De Vega, one of their alumni, to their Sports Hall of Fame in 2008. In 2018, De Vega was inducted to the Philippine Sports Hall of Fame.
