= Mary Leela Rao =

Indian sprinter

Violet Peters
Personal information
- Nationality: Indian

Sport
- Country: India
- Sport: Athletics
Medal record
Women's athletics
Representing India
Asian Games
Bronze medal – third place	1958 Tokyo	4×100 m

Mary Leela Rao (born 1940) is an Indian sprint athlete who participated in the 1956 Summer Olympics. She was an Olympic athlete from India. Rao could not complete the qualifying race for the 100 meters, and was eliminated from further competition.

She won a bronze medal in 4 × 100 m relay in the 1958 Asian Games.
