= Leon Khachatourian =

Armenian boxer (1937–2025)

Personal information
- Born: 13 November 1937 Iran
- Died: 15 December 2025 (aged 88) Glendale, California, U.S.

Sport
- Sport: Boxing
Medal record
Men's boxing
Asian Games
Bronze medal – third place	1958 Tokyo	75 kg
- Updated on 01/09/2026

Leon Khachatourian (Armenian: Լեէոն Խաչատրեան; 13 November 1937 – 15 December 2025) was an Armenian boxer who became a member of Iran senior national Boxing team in 1957, and was also a member of Tehran Taj Club. He participated as a member of the Iranian boxers at the 1958 Asian Games, in the Middleweight division. In Tokyo 1958, Khachatourian lost on points to Hari Singh Thapa from India, in the semifinal, and won the bronze medal of the 75 kg boxing division. He retired from championship boxing and the Iranian national boxing team, after returning from the 1958 Asian Games.

Khachatourian died on 15 December 2025, at the age of 88.
