= Etsuko Miyamoto =

Japanese sprinter (born 1943)

Personal information
- Nationality: Japanese
- Born: 23 August 1943 (age 82)

Sport
- Sport: Sprinting
- Event: 4 × 100 metres relay

Etsuko Miyamoto (宮本 悦子, Miyamoto Etsuko; born 23 August 1943) is a Japanese sprinter. She competed in the women's 4 × 100 metres relay at the 1964 Summer Olympics.
