= Hisao Morita =

Japanese pole vaulter (born 1939)

Personal information
- Born: 25 September 1939 (age 86)

Sport
- Sport: Track and field
Medal record
Representing Japan
Asian Games
Gold medal – first place	1962 Jakarta	Pole vault

Hisao Morita (盛田 久生, Morita Hisao; born 25 September 1939) is a Japanese former pole vaulter who competed in the 1964 Summer Olympics.
