= Visitacion Badana =

Filipino long jumper (born 1937)

Visitación Badana
Personal information
- Nationality: Filipino
- Born: July 2, 1937 (age 88) Cebu City, Philippine Commonwealth

Sport
- Sport: Athletics
- Event: Long jump
Medal record
Women's athletics
Representing Philippines
Asian Games
Gold medal – first place	1958 Tokyo	Long jump

Visitación Badana Ribagorda (born July 2, 1937) is a Filipino athlete. She competed in the women's long jump at the 1960 Summer Olympics.
