= Hiroko Uchida-Yokoyama =

Japanese discus thrower

Personal information
- Full name: 内田-横山 弘子 Uchida-Yokoyama Hiroko
- Nationality: Japanese
- Born: 11 February 1936 (age 89) Kumamoto, Japan

Sport
- Sport: Athletics
- Event: Discus throw

Hiroko Uchida-Yokoyama (born 11 February 1936) is a Japanese athlete. She competed in the women's discus throw at the 1960 Summer Olympics and the 1964 Summer Olympics.
