= Elizabeth Davenport =

Indian javelin thrower

Personal information
- Nationality: Indian
- Born: Bombay, British India

Sport
- Country: India
- Sport: Athletics
Medal record
Women's athletics
Representing India
Asian Games
Silver medal – second place	1958 Tokyo	Javelin Throw
Bronze medal – third place	1962 Jakarta	Javelin Throw

Elizabeth "Betty" Davenport (born October 1, 1938) is an Indian athlete. She won a silver medal in the 1958 Tokyo Asian games and bronze medal in 1962 Jakarta Asian games in Javelin Throw . She belonged to an Anglo-Indian family from Bombay. Davenport was the discus and javelin national champion and later became the sports mistress at the Frank Anthony Public School at New Delhi.
