= Pablo Somblingo =

Filipino sprinter (born 1932)

Personal information
- Nationality: Filipino
- Born: 1932 Barotac Nuevo, Philippines

Sport
- Sport: Sprinting
- Event: 400 metres
Medal record
Men's Athletics
Representing Philippines
Asian Games
Silver medal – second place	1958 Tokyo	400m
Bronze medal – third place	1958 Tokyo	4 × 400 m relay
Bronze medal – third place	1954 Manila	4 × 400 m relay

Pablo Bondad Somblingo (born 1932, date of death unknown) was a Filipino sprinter. He competed in the men's 400 metres at the 1956 Summer Olympics. He was also the silver medalist in the same event at the 1958 Asian Games. Somblingo is deceased.
