= Takashi Miki (javelin thrower) =

Japanese javelin thrower (born 1939)

Personal information
- Born: 27 April 1939 (age 87) Tokyo, Japan

Sport
- Sport: Track and field
Medal record
Representing Japan
Asian Games
Gold medal – first place	1962 Jakarta	Javelin throw

Takashi Miki (born 27 April 1939) is a Japanese former javelin thrower who competed in the 1964 Summer Olympics.
