= Mohinder Singh =

Indian athlete

Personal information
- Nationality: Indian
- Born: March 15, 1934 Khan Khana, Punjab, British India
- Died: May 26, 2002 (aged 68)

Sport
- Sport: Athletics
- Event: Triple jump / long jump

Mohinder Singh Rai (15 March 1934 – 26 May 2002) was an Indian triple jumper born in village Khan Khana Punjab who competed in the 1956 Summer Olympics.

Singh finished second behind Fred Alsop in the triple jump event at the British 1960 AAA Championships.
