= Teruo Itokawa =

Japanese shot putter

Teruo Itokawa (糸川 照雄, Itokawa Teruo; 20 October 1940 – 4 October 2000) was a Japanese shot putter who competed in the 1964 Summer Olympics.
