= Manolita Cinco =

Filipino hurdler (born 1931)

Personal information
- Nationality: Filipino
- Born: 1931 (age 94–95)

Sport
- Sport: Track and field
- Event: 80 metres hurdles

Manolita Cinco Dopeno (born 1931) is a Filipino hurdler. She competed in the women's 80 metres hurdles at the 1956 Summer Olympics. She was the first woman to represent the Philippines at the Olympics. She is married to Alejo Dopeno. Later in her life, she was diagnosed with breast cancer but survived it.
