= Aida Molinos =

Filipino sprinter

Personal information
- Nationality: Filipino
- Born: September 14, 1941 (age 84)
- Height: 5 ft 3 in (159 cm)
- Weight: 108 lb (49 kg)

Sport
- Sport: Sprinting
- Event: 4 × 100 metres relay

Aida O. Molinos Plares (born September 14, 1941) is a Filipino sprinter. She competed in the women's 4 × 100 metres relay at the 1964 Summer Olympics.
