= Muhammad Nawaz =

Pakistani athlete (1924–2004)

Personal information
- Nationality: Pakistani
- Born: Muhammad Nawaz; 15 August 1924 Budhial, British India
- Died: 13 May 2004 (aged 79) Budhial, Pakistan
- Height: 1.79 m (5 ft 10 in)
- Weight: 88 kg (194 lb)

Sport
- Sport: Athletics
- Event: Javelin throw
Medal record
Men's Athletics
Representing Pakistan
Asian Games
Gold medal – first place	1954 Manila	Javelin throw
Gold medal – first place	1958 Tokyo	Javelin throw
Silver medal – second place	1962 Tokyo	Javelin throw
Commonwealth Games
Silver medal – second place	1954 Vancouver	Javelin throw
Bronze medal – third place	1966 Kingston	Javelin throw

Muhammad Nawaz
- Awards: Pride of Performance award by the President of Pakistan in 1966

Muhammad Nawaz (15 August 1924 – 13 May 2004) was a Pakistani javelin thrower who competed at the 1956 and 1960 Summer Olympics.

== Early life ==
Nawaz was born on 15 August 1924 in the village of Budhial, Talagang District in the Punjab province, British Raj.

== Career ==
Nawaz won two gold medals for Pakistan in the 1954 and 1958 Asian Games, with each throw setting a new games record. His compatriot Jalal Khan won the silver medal in both editions. In the 1962 Asian Games at the age of 38, he won the silver medal.

He came second in the 1954 Commonwealth Games in Vancouver, again ahead of Jalal Khan who achieved the bronze medal. Twelve years later at the age of 42, he won a bronze medal in the 1966 Commonwealth Games in Kingston.

He also qualified for the final of the 1956 Olympics in Melbourne where he finished 14th and won the British AAA Championships title at the 1960 AAA Championships.

Like his fellow soldiers, Nawaz was awarded with honours at the World Military Games and several international tournaments.

== Awards and recognition ==
Ribbon	Decoration	Country	Year
	Pride of Performance	Pakistan	1966

Nawaz was awarded the Pride of Performance Award in 1966 in recognition of his outstanding achievements and contributions to athletics.

== See also ==
- List of Pakistani records in athletics
- Athletics in Pakistan
- Pakistan at the Olympics
