= Mona Sulaiman =

Filipino athlete

Personal information
- Nationality: Filipino
- Born: June 9, 1942 Cotabato, Philippine Commonwealth
- Died: December 21, 2017 (aged 75) Manila, Philippines
- Height: 5 ft 5 in (165 cm)
- Weight: 130 lb (59 kg)

Sport
- Sport: Sprinting
- Event: 100 metres
Medal record
Women's Athletics
Representing Philippines
Asian Games
Gold medal – first place	1962 Jakarta	100m
Gold medal – first place	1962 Jakarta	200m
Gold medal – first place	1962 Jakarta	4 × 100m relay
Bronze medal – third place	1962 Jakarta	Shot put

Mona Sulaiman (June 9, 1942 – December 21, 2017) was a Filipina sprinter who competed at the Asian Games and the Summer Olympics.

== Early life ==
Mona Sulaiman was born in a barrio in Cotabato on June 9, 1942 to Kudelat and Aminan Sulaiman, who were Muslims.

== Career ==
Sulaiman started her career competing in regional meets. She competed at the 1962 Asian Games in Jakarta where she won gold medals in the 100 and 200 metre sprints and relay events. She also garnered a bronze medal in the shot put event at the same tournament.

She competed at the Summer Olympics in the 100 metres event at the 1960 and the 1964 editions.

Sulaiman also excelled in the disciplines of pentathlon and discus throw.

When sex testing began being introduced in the late 1960s, Sulaiman was reportedly wary and pulled out of the 1966 Asian Games instead of taking it. A medal hopeful, her absence from the Games was lamented. She had traveled to the Asian Games with the Philippines delegation, but her refusal to take the test was reported on by media at home in Manila, leading to more attention. Philippines officials responded to this by announcing that Sulaiman would be banned from athletics.

== Later life and death ==
After retiring from competitive play, Solaiman worked in the private sector until the 1990s when she was hired by the Philippine Sports Commission to serve as a consultant for the national athletics team.

Sulaiman was inducted into the PSC Hall of Fame in January 2016. Around this time, Solaiman's health has declined due to various health conditions including diabetes. She now uses a wheelchair by this time.

She died in Manila on 21 December 2017. She was 75.

== Legacy ==
Solaiman and bowler Bong Coo share the Asian Games record for the most gold medals won by a Filipino athlete - male or female - in a single edition. In the 1962 Asian Games in Jakarta, she won three gold medals (100 meter dash, 200 meter dash, and 4100 meter relay).

Solaiman was among the second group of Filipino sports legends inducted into the Philippine Sports Hall of Fame on January 25, 2016 at the Century Park Hotel in Manila.
