= Chang Lo-pu =

Taiwanese boxer (1929–2005)

Personal information
- Nationality: Taiwanese
- Born: 2 February 1929 Tianjin, China
- Died: 2005 (aged 75–76)

Sport
- Sport: Boxing

Chang Lo-pu (2 February 1929 – 2005) was a Taiwanese boxer. He competed in the men's middleweight event at the 1960 Summer Olympics. Chang died in 2005.
