= Amrit Pal (athlete) =

Indian athlete

Amrit Pal (born 5 June 1939) is an Indian track and field athlete.

He competed in the 800 metre dash at the 1962 Asian Games and won the bronze medal. Pal also appeared at the 1964 Summer Olympics running the 4 × 400 metres relay and 400 metres hurdles.
