= Jalal Khan (athlete) =

Pakistani javelin thrower

Personal information
- Nationality: Pakistani
- Born: Jalal Khan; 13 August 1927

Sport
- Sport: Athletics
- Event: Javelin throw
Medal record
Men's Athletics
Asian Games
Silver medal – second place	1954 Manila	Javelin throw
Silver medal – second place	1958 Tokyo	Javelin throw
Commonwealth Games
Silver medal – second place	1958 Cardiff	Javelin throw
Bronze medal – third place	1954 Vancouver	Javelin throw

Jalal Khan (born 13 August 1927) was a Pakistani javelin thrower. Khan represented Pakistan at the 1952 Summer Olympics and 1956 Summer Olympics.

== Biography ==
Jalal won the bronze medal in the 1954 Commonwealth Games and silver four years later in 1958. In 1954, his compatriot Muhammad Nawaz won the silver medal.

In the Asian Games, he won two silver medals in 1954 and 1958, with Muhammad Nawaz winning the gold on both occasions.

His personal best, 73.16m, was set in 1959. Khan was twice third at the British AAA Championships at the 1958 AAA Championships and the 1959 AAA Championships.

Like his fellow soldiers, Khan was awarded with honours at the World Military Games and several international tournaments.

== See also ==
- List of Pakistani records in athletics
- Athletics in Pakistan
- Pakistan at the Olympics
