= Balkar Singh (athlete) =

Indian discus thrower

Personal information
- Nationality: Indian

Sport
- Country: India
- Sport: Athletics
Medal record
Men's athletics
Representing India
Asian Games
Gold medal – first place	1958 Tokyo	Discus throw
Bronze medal – third place	1966 Bangkok	Discus throw

Balkar Singh is an Indian athlete. He won a gold medal in Discus throw in the 1958 Tokyo Asian games.
