= Inocencia Solis =

Filipino long jumper

Personal information
- Nationality: Filipino
- Born: 28 December 1932
- Died: 4 November 2001 (aged 68) Iloilo City, Philippines

Sport
- Sport: Athletics
- Events: 100-meter; 200-meter; Long jump
Medal record
Women's athletics
Representing Philippines
Asian Games
Gold medal – first place	1958 Tokyo	100m
Gold medal – first place	1962 Jakarta	4 x 100m relay
Silver medal – second place	1958 Tokyo	4 × 100m relay
Bronze medal – third place	1954 Manila	200m
Bronze medal – third place	1954 Manila	4 × 100m relay

Inocencia Solis was a Filipino sprinter who competed at the 1958 and 1962 Asian Games.

== Career ==
A native of New Lucena in Iloilo, Solis was born on 28 December 1932, to Victorino Solis and Leonarda Silomenio who are both farmers. She started competing in athletic competitions while she was studying at New Lucena Elementary School. She continued to compete while attending Santa Barbara National High School. In 1950, she won three gold medals at the National Inter-Scholastic Athletic Association by setting new national records in the 100-meter and 200-meter runs and in long jump. She held this record for years; 12 years (for the 100-meter run), 15 years (200-meter), and 7 years (long jump).

The Cebu Institute of Technology gave her full scholarship for her feat in athletics. She obtained a bachelor's degree in elementary education from the educational institution and went on to become a school teacher, while simultaneously worked as a coach based in Cebu.

Solis competed for the Philippines at the 1958 Asian Games in Tokyo where she won the gold medal in the women's 100 meters event with a time record of 12 minutes and 5 seconds. The Philippine Sportswriters Association recognized her as the Athlete of the Year in 1958. She moved to Caloocan sometime in the 1960s, after the city government recruited her. She also competed in the 1962 Asian Games where she won another gold medal; in the 4 x 100 meters event with Mona Solaiman, Aida Molinos and Francisca Sanopal.

== Death ==
Solis died on 4 November 2001, while at the Iloilo Mission Hospital due to complications from diabetes.
