= Lolita Lagrosas =

Filipino athlete (born 1938)

Personal information
- Nationality: Filipino
- Born: August 24, 1938 (age 87) Initao, Misamis Oriental, Philippine Commonwealth (now part of Naawan, Misamis Oriental)

Sport
- Sport: Athletics
- Event: Long jump

Lolita R. Lagrosas (born August 24, 1938) is a Filipino athlete. She competed in the women's long jump and the women's high jump at the 1964 Summer Olympics.

Lagrosas won silver in the high jump event of the 1958 Asian where she recorded 1.56m.
