= Enrique Bautista =

Filipino sprinter (1934–2005)

Personal information
- Nationality: Filipino
- Born: July 15, 1934 Hagonoy, Bulacan, Philippine Islands
- Died: July 25, 2005 (aged 71) Pittsburg, California, U.S.
- Height: 5 ft 6 in (168 cm)
- Weight: 126 lb (57 kg)

Sport
- Sport: Sprinting
- Event: 200 metres
Medal record
Men's Athletics
Representing Philippines
Asian Games
Bronze medal – third place	1958 Tokyo	200m

Enrique Bautista (July 15, 1934 – July 25, 2005) was a Filipino sprinter. He competed in the men's 200 metres at the 1960 Summer Olympics.
