= Parduman Singh Brar =

Indian athlete (1927–2007)

Personal information
- Nationality: Indian
- Born: 15 October 1927 Bhagta Bhai, Bhatinda; Punjab Province, British India
- Died: 22 March 2007 (aged 79) Bhagta Bhai, Bhatinda, Punjab, India

Sport
- Country: India
- Sport: Track and field
- Events: Shot put, Discus throw
- Club: Services
Medal record
Men's Athletics
Representing India
Asian Games
Gold medal – first place	1954 Manila	Shot put
Gold medal – first place	1954 Manila	Discus
Gold medal – first place	1958 Tokyo	Shot put
Bronze medal – third place	1958 Tokyo	Discus
Silver medal – second place	1962 Jakarta	Discus

Parduman Singh Brar (15 October 1927 – 22 March 2007) was an Indian athlete who specialized in shot put and discus throw events. He was one of the few Indians to have won multiple medals at the Asian Games.

== Career ==
Brar was India's national champion in the shot put and discus throw events in the 1950s. He won his first national shot put event in Madras in 1958 and won the national discus throw events in 1954, 1958 and 1959. In the 1954 Asian Games in Manila, he won gold medals in the shot put and discus throw events, thus becoming the first athlete in Asia to achieve the feat. He continued his performance in the 1958 Asian Games in Tokyo, winning a gold in the shot put event and bronze in the discus throw event. In his last games appearance in 1962 in Jakarta, he won a silver medal in discus throw, thus completing his medal tally of five medals in three Asian games events. He was given the Arjuna Award by the Government of India in 1999 recognizing his contribution to Indian sports.

== Death ==
Brar, paralysed after an accident in the early 1980s, died on 22 March 2007 in his native village in Punjab after prolonged illness. Poverty stricken, he died penniless.
