= Isaac Gomez (sprinter) =

Filipino sprinter

Isaac Gómez
Personal information
- Nationality: Filipino
- Born: June 3, 1934 (age 92) Pampanga, Philippine Islands
- Height: 5 ft 5 in (166 cm)
- Weight: 128 lb (58 kg)

Sport
- Sport: Sprinting
- Event: 100 metres
Medal record
Men's Athletics
Representing Philippines
Asian Games
| Gold medal – first place | 1962 Jakarta | 4 × 100 m relay |
| Gold medal – first place | 1958 Tokyo | 4 × 100 m relay |
| Bronze medal – third place | 1958 Tokyo | 100m |

Isaac Gómez (born June 3, 1934 in Pampanga) is a Filipino sprinter. He competed in the men's 100 metres at the 1960 Summer Olympics.

Gómez was inducted to the Philippine Sports Hall of Fame in 2016.
