= Arnulfo Valles =

Filipino sprinter

Personal information
- Nationality: Filipino
- Born: August 15, 1940 (age 85) Tagbilaran, Bohol, Philippine Commonwealth
- Height: 5 ft 9 in (175 cm)
- Weight: 146 lb (66 kg)

Sport
- Sport: Sprinting
- Event: 100 metres

Arnulfo Vallejos Valles (born August 15, 1940) is a Filipino sprinter. He competed in the men's 100 metres at the 1964 Summer Olympics.
