= List of Asian Games medalists in athletics =

This is the complete list of Asian Games medalists in athletics from 1951 to 2026.

== Men ==
=== 100 m ===
Games	Gold	Silver	Bronze
1951 New Delhi	Lavy Pinto (IND)	Toshihiro Ohashi (JPN)	Tomio Hosoda (JPN)
1954 Manila	Abdul Khaliq (PAK)	Genaro Cabrera (PHI)	Marian Gabriel (IND)
1958 Tokyo	Abdul Khaliq (PAK)	Kyohei Ushio (JPN)	Isaac Gomez (PHI)
1962 Jakarta	Mohammad Sarengat (INA)	Mani Jegathesan (MAL)	Rogelio Onofre (PHI)
1966 Bangkok	Mani Jegathesan (MAL)	C. Kunalan (SIN)	Hideo Iijima (JPN)
1970 Bangkok	Masahide Jinno (JPN)	Anat Ratanapol (THA)	C. Kunalan (SIN)
1974 Tehran	Anat Ratanapol (THA)	Masahide Jinno (JPN)	Suchart Jairsuraparp (THA)
1978 Bangkok	Suchart Jairsuraparp (THA)	Ramaswamy Gnanasekaran (IND)	Seo Mal-gu (KOR)
1982 New Delhi	Rabuan Pit (MAL)	Jang Jae-keun (KOR)	Suchart Jairsuraparp (THA)
1986 Seoul	Talal Mansour (QAT)	Hiroki Fuwa (JPN)	Zheng Chen (CHN)
1990 Beijing	Talal Mansour (QAT)	Zheng Chen (CHN)	Sriyantha Dissanayake (SRI)
1994 Hiroshima	Talal Mansour (QAT)	Vitaliy Savin (KAZ)	Chen Wenzhong (CHN)
1998 Bangkok	Koji Ito (JPN)	Reanchai Seeharwong (THA)	Yasukatsu Otsuki (JPN)
2002 Busan	Jamal Al-Saffar (KSA)	Nobuharu Asahara (JPN)	Chen Haijian (CHN)
2006 Doha	Yahya Habeeb (KSA)	Naoki Tsukahara (JPN)	Wachara Sondee (THA)
2010 Guangzhou	Lao Yi (CHN)	Yasir Al-Nashiri (KSA)	Barakat Al-Harthi (OMA)
2014 Incheon	Femi Ogunode (QAT)	Su Bingtian (CHN)	Kei Takase (JPN)
2018 Jakarta–Palembang	Su Bingtian (CHN)	Tosin Ogunode (QAT)	Ryota Yamagata (JPN)
2022 Hangzhou	Xie Zhenye (CHN)	Puripol Boonson (THA)	Muhd Azeem Fahmi (MAS)
2026 Aichi–Nagoya	Puripol Boonson (THA)	Ali Anwar Al-Balushi (OMA)	Malham Al-Balushi (OMA)

=== 200 m ===
Games	Gold	Silver	Bronze
1951 New Delhi	Lavy Pinto (IND)	Marian Gabriel (IND)	Tomio Hosoda (JPN)
1954 Manila	Muhammad Sharif Butt (PAK)	Khwaja Muhammad Aslam (PAK)	Stephen Xavier (HKG)
1958 Tokyo	Milkha Singh (IND)	Abdul Khaliq (PAK)	Enrique Bautista (PHI)
1962 Jakarta	Mani Jegathesan (MAL)	Hideo Iijima (JPN)	Mohammad Sarengat (INA)
1966 Bangkok	Mani Jegathesan (MAL)	Ajmer Singh (IND)	Thambu Krishnan (MAL)
1970 Bangkok	Anat Ratanapol (THA)	Masahide Jinno (JPN)	C. Kunalan (SIN)
1974 Tehran	Anat Ratanapol (THA)	Takao Ishizawa (JPN)	Nusrat Iqbal Sahi (PAK)
1978 Bangkok	Ramaswamy Gnanasekaran (IND)	Yasuhiro Harada (JPN)	Anat Ratanapol (THA)
1982 New Delhi	Jang Jae-keun (KOR)	Toshio Toyota (JPN)	Rabuan Pit (MAL)
1986 Seoul	Jang Jae-keun (KOR)	Li Feng (CHN)	Masahiro Nagura (JPN)
1990 Beijing	Susumu Takano (JPN)	Sriyantha Dissanayake (SRI)	Zhao Cunlin (CHN)
1994 Hiroshima	Talal Mansour (QAT)	Koji Ito (JPN)	Ibrahim Ismail Muftah (QAT)
1998 Bangkok	Koji Ito (JPN)	Han Chaoming (CHN)	Sugath Thilakaratne (SRI)
2002 Busan	Shingo Suetsugu (JPN)	Gennadiy Chernovol (KAZ)	Yang Yaozu (CHN)
2006 Doha	Shingo Suetsugu (JPN)	Yang Yaozu (CHN)	Shinji Takahira (JPN)
2010 Guangzhou	Femi Ogunode (QAT)	Kenji Fujimitsu (JPN)	Omar Juma Al-Salfa (UAE)
2014 Incheon	Femi Ogunode (QAT)	Fahhad Al-Subaie (KSA)	Yeo Ho-sua (KOR)
2018 Jakarta–Palembang	Yuki Koike (JPN)	Yang Chun-han (TPE)	Yaqoob Salem Yaqoob (BRN)
2022 Hangzhou	Koki Ueyama (JPN)	Abdullah Abkar Mohammed (KSA)	Yang Chun-han (TPE)
2026 Aichi-Nagoya	Puripol Boonson (THA)	Huang Youwen (CHN)	Soshi Mizukubo (JPN)

=== 400 m ===
Games	Gold	Silver	Bronze
1951 New Delhi	Eitaro Okano (JPN)	Amit Singh Bakshi (IND)	Govind Singh (IND)
1954 Manila	Kanji Akagi (JPN)	Joginder Singh Dhanaor (IND)	Chen Ying-long (ROC)
1958 Tokyo	Milkha Singh (IND)	Pablo Somblingo (PHI)	Abdul Rahim Ahmad (MAL)
1962 Jakarta	Milkha Singh (IND)	Makhan Singh (IND)	Kimitada Hayase (JPN)
1966 Bangkok	Ajmer Singh (IND)	Yoshinori Sakai (JPN)	Masami Yoshida (JPN)
1970 Bangkok	Yoshiharu Tomonaga (JPN)	Wickremasinghe Wimaladasa (CEY)	Sucha Singh (IND)
1974 Tehran	Wickremasinghe Wimaladasa (SRI)	Reza Entezari (IRN)	Yoshiharu Tomonaga (JPN)
1978 Bangkok	Abbas Laibi (IRQ)	Uday K. Prabhu (IND)	Murali Kuttan (IND)
1982 New Delhi	Susumu Takano (JPN)	K. K. Premachandran (IND)	Guo Shunqi (CHN)
1986 Seoul	Susumu Takano (JPN)	Isidro del Prado (PHI)	Mohammed Al-Malki (OMA)
1990 Beijing	Mohammed Al-Malki (OMA)	Ibrahim Ismail Muftah (QAT)	Koichi Konakatomi (JPN)
1994 Hiroshima	Ibrahim Ismail Muftah (QAT)	Shon Ju-il (KOR)	Aktawat Sakoolchan (THA)
1998 Bangkok	Sugath Thilakaratne (SRI)	Ibrahim Ismail Muftah (QAT)	Paramjit Singh (IND)
2002 Busan	Fawzi Al-Shammari (KUW)	Hamdan Al-Bishi (KSA)	Rohan Pradeep Kumara (SRI)
2006 Doha	Hamdan Al-Bishi (KSA)	Brandon Simpson (BRN)	Fawzi Al-Shammari (KUW)
2010 Guangzhou	Femi Ogunode (QAT)	Yuzo Kanemaru (JPN)	Yousef Masrahi (KSA)
2014 Incheon	Yousef Masrahi (KSA)	Abbas Abubakar Abbas (BRN)	Arokia Rajiv (IND)
2018 Jakarta–Palembang	Abdalelah Haroun (QAT)	Muhammed Anas (IND)	Ali Khamis (BRN)
2022 Hangzhou	Yousef Masrahi (KSA)	Kentaro Sato (JPN)	Abbas Yusuf Ali (BRN)
2026 Aichi–Nagoya	Joshua Atkinson (THA)	Abdulrahman Suleiman (UAE)	Yuki Joseph Nakajima (JPN)

=== 800 m ===
Games	Gold	Silver	Bronze
1951 New Delhi	Ranjit Singh (IND)	Kulwant Singh (IND)	Kikuo Moriya (JPN)
1954 Manila	Yoshitaka Muroya (JPN)	Sohan Singh Dhanoa (IND)	Michio Ueki (JPN)
1958 Tokyo	Yoshitaka Muroya (JPN)	Mahmoud Khaligh Razavi (IRN)	Sim Sang-ok (KOR)
1962 Jakarta	Mamoru Morimoto (JPN)	Daljit Singh (IND)	Amrit Pal (IND)
1966 Bangkok	Bhogeswar Baruah (IND)	Ramasamy Subramaniam (MAL)	Mamoru Morimoto (JPN)
1970 Bangkok	Jimmy Crampton (BIR)	Sriram Singh (IND)	Yoshitake Tsuchiya (JPN)
1974 Tehran	Sriram Singh (IND)	Reza Entezari (IRN)	Muhammad Siddique (PAK)
1978 Bangkok	Sriram Singh (IND)	Falah Naji (IRQ)	Takashi Ishii (JPN)
1982 New Delhi	Charles Borromeo (IND)	Kim Bok-joo (KOR)	Falah Naji (IRQ)
1986 Seoul	Kim Bok-joo (KOR)	Ryu Tae-kyung (KOR)	Najem Al-Sowailem (KUW)
1990 Beijing	Kim Bong-yoo (KOR)	Ryu Tae-kyung (KOR)	Nadir Khan (PAK)
1994 Hiroshima	Lee Jin-il (KOR)	Mu Weiguo (CHN)	Kim Yong-hwan (KOR)
1998 Bangkok	Lee Jin-il (KOR)	Kim Soon-hyung (KOR)	Abdulrahman Hassan Abdullah (QAT)
2002 Busan	Rashid Mohamed (BRN)	K. M. Binu (IND)	Li Huiquan (CHN)
2006 Doha	Yusuf Saad Kamel (BRN)	Mohammad Al-Azemi (KUW)	Ehsan Mohajer Shojaei (IRI)
2010 Guangzhou	Sajjad Moradi (IRI)	Adnan Taess (IRQ)	Musaeb Abdulrahman Balla (QAT)
2014 Incheon	Adnan Taess (IRQ)	Teng Haining (CHN)	Jamal Hairane (QAT)
2018 Jakarta–Palembang	Manjit Singh (IND)	Jinson Johnson (IND)	Abubaker Haydar Abdalla (QAT)
2022 Hangzhou	Essa Kzwani (KSA)	Mohammed Afsal (IND)	Husain Al-Farsi (OMA)
2026 Aichi–Nagoya	Ko Ochiai (JPN)	Ali Amirian (IRI)	Abubaker Haydar Abdalla (QAT)

=== 1500 m ===
Games	Gold	Silver	Bronze
1951 New Delhi	Nikka Singh (IND)	Susumu Takahashi (JPN)	Kikuo Moriya (JPN)
1954 Manila	Choi Yoon-chil (KOR)	Yoshitaka Muroya (JPN)	Michio Ueki (JPN)
1958 Tokyo	Mahmoud Khaligh Razavi (IRN)	Michio Okayama (JPN)	Sim Sang-ok (KOR)
1962 Jakarta	Mohinder Singh (IND)	Amrit Pal (IND)	Satsuo Iwashita (JPN)
1966 Bangkok	Keisuke Sawaki (JPN)	Ramasamy Subramaniam (MAL)	Satsuo Iwashita (JPN)
1970 Bangkok	Susumu Noro (JPN)	Muhammad Younis (PAK)	Jimmy Crampton (BIR)
1974 Tehran	Muhammad Younis (PAK)	Susumu Noro (JPN)	Park Suk-kwan (KOR)
1978 Bangkok	Takashi Ishii (JPN)	Muhammad Younis (PAK)	Ratan Singh Bhadauria (IND)
1982 New Delhi	Falah Naji (IRQ)	Yutaka Hirai (JPN)	Suresh Yadav (IND)
1986 Seoul	Shuji Oshida (JPN)	Ryu Tae-kyung (KOR)	Mohamed Suleiman (QAT)
1990 Beijing	Mohamed Suleiman (QAT)	Kim Bong-yoo (KOR)	Mitsuhiro Okuyama (JPN)
1994 Hiroshima	Mohamed Suleiman (QAT)	Mu Weiguo (CHN)	Mitsuhiro Okuyama (JPN)
1998 Bangkok	Mohamed Suleiman (QAT)	Kim Soon-hyung (KOR)	Bahadur Prasad (IND)
2002 Busan	Rashid Ramzi (BRN)	Dou Zhaobo (CHN)	Li Huiquan (CHN)
2006 Doha	Daham Najim Bashir (QAT)	Belal Mansoor Ali (BRN)	Rashid Ramzi (BRN)
2010 Guangzhou	Mohammed Shaween (KSA)	Sajjad Moradi (IRI)	Belal Mansoor Ali (BRN)
2014 Incheon	Mohamad Al-Garni (QAT)	Rashid Ramzi (BRN)	Adnan Taess (IRQ)
2018 Jakarta–Palembang	Jinson Johnson (IND)	Amir Moradi (IRI)	Mohammed Tiouali (BRN)
2022 Hangzhou	Mohamad Al-Garni (QAT)	Ajay Kumar Saroj (IND)	Jinson Johnson (IND)
2026 Aichi–Nagoya	Kazuto Iizawa (JPN)	Gulveer Singh (IND)	Nagiya Mori (JPN)

=== 5000 m ===
Games	Gold	Silver	Bronze
1951 New Delhi	Ali Baghbanbashi (IRN)	Pritam Singh (IND)	Soichi Tamoi (JPN)
1954 Manila	Osamu Inoue (JPN)	Choi Yoon-chil (KOR)	Dalu Ram (IND)
1958 Tokyo	Osamu Inoue (JPN)	Han Sung-chul (KOR)	Ali Baghbanbashi (IRN)
1962 Jakarta	Mubarak Shah (PAK)	Saburo Yokomizo (JPN)	Tarlok Singh (IND)
1966 Bangkok	Keisuke Sawaki (JPN)	Kazuo Tsuchiya (JPN)	Lucien Rosa (CEY)
1970 Bangkok	Lucien Rosa (CEY)	Edward Sequeira (IND)	Yuval Wischnitzer (ISR)
1974 Tehran	Shivnath Singh (IND)	Yuval Wischnitzer (ISR)	Kenichi Ozawa (JPN)
1978 Bangkok	Hari Chand (IND)	Takao Nakamura (JPN)	Cui Yulin (CHN)
1982 New Delhi	Masanari Shintaku (JPN)	Zhang Guowei (CHN)	Raj Kumar (IND)
1986 Seoul	Kim Jong-yoon (KOR)	Masanari Shintaku (JPN)	Yutaka Kanai (JPN)
1990 Beijing	Mohamed Suleiman (QAT)	Koichi Morishita (JPN)	Zhang Guowei (CHN)
1994 Hiroshima	Toshinari Takaoka (JPN)	Ahmed Ibrahim Warsama (QAT)	Sun Ripeng (CHN)
1998 Bangkok	Mohamed Suleiman (QAT)	Ahmed Ibrahim Warsama (QAT)	Baek Seung-do (KOR)
2002 Busan	Mukhlid Al-Otaibi (KSA)	Abdelhak Zakaria (BRN)	Khamis Abdullah Saifeldin (QAT)
2006 Doha	James Kwalia (QAT)	Mushir Salem Jawher (BRN)	Sultan Khamis Zaman (QAT)
2010 Guangzhou	Hasan Mahboob (BRN)	James Kwalia (QAT)	Felix Kibore (QAT)
2014 Incheon	Mohamad Al-Garni (QAT)	Alemu Bekele (BRN)	Albert Rop (BRN)
2018 Jakarta–Palembang	Birhanu Balew (BRN)	Albert Rop (BRN)	Tariq Al-Amri (KSA)
2022 Hangzhou	Birhanu Balew (BRN)	Avinash Sable (IND)	Dawit Fikadu (BRN)
2026 Aichi–Nagoya	Birhanu Balew (BRN)	Tomonori Yamaguchi (JPN)	Gulveer Singh (IND)

=== 10,000 m ===
Games	Gold	Silver	Bronze
1951 New Delhi	Soichi Tamoi (JPN)	Ryosuke Takasugi (JPN)	Gurbachan Singh (IND)
1954 Manila	Choi Chung-sik (KOR)	Jiro Yamauchi (JPN)	Pi Li-ming (ROC)
1958 Tokyo	Takashi Baba (JPN)	Mubarak Shah (PAK)	Ali Baghbanbashi (IRN)
1962 Jakarta	Tarlok Singh (IND)	Teruo Funai (JPN)	Gurnam Singh (INA)
1966 Bangkok	Kazuo Tsuchiya (JPN)	Sunao Shirai (JPN)	Lucien Rosa (CEY)
1970 Bangkok	Lucien Rosa (CEY)	Kenichi Otsuki (JPN)	Park Bong-keun (KOR)
1974 Tehran	Yasunori Hamada (JPN)	Shivnath Singh (IND)	Makoto Hattori (JPN)
1978 Bangkok	Hari Chand (IND)	Robert (BIR)	Ko Ko (BIR)
1982 New Delhi	Zhang Guowei (CHN)	Kenji Ide (JPN)	Park Won-keun (KOR)
1986 Seoul	Masanari Shintaku (JPN)	Kim Jong-yoon (KOR)	Toshihiko Seko (JPN)
1990 Beijing	Koichi Morishita (JPN)	Kim Jae-ryong (KOR)	Zhang Guowei (CHN)
1994 Hiroshima	Toshinari Takaoka (JPN)	Jun Hiratsuka (JPN)	Alyan Al-Qahtani (KSA)
1998 Bangkok	Kenji Takao (JPN)	Ahmed Ibrahim Warsama (QAT)	Gulab Chand (IND)
2002 Busan	Mukhlid Al-Otaibi (KSA)	Ahmed Ibrahim Warsama (QAT)	Abdelhak Zakaria (BRN)
2006 Doha	Hasan Mahboob (BRN)	Essa Ismail Rashed (QAT)	Aadam Ismaeel Khamis (BRN)
2010 Guangzhou	Bilisuma Shugi (BRN)	Essa Ismail Rashed (QAT)	Hasan Mahboob (BRN)
2014 Incheon	El-Hassan El-Abbassi (BRN)	Suguru Osako (JPN)	Isaac Korir (BRN)
2018 Jakarta–Palembang	Abraham Cheroben (BRN)	Zhao Changhong (CHN)	Kieran Tuntivate (THA)
2022 Hangzhou	Birhanu Balew (BRN)	Kartik Kumar (IND)	Gulveer Singh (IND)
2026 Aichi-Nagoya	Birhanu Balew (BRN)	Gulveer Singh (IND)	Albert Kiptoo (BRN)

=== 110 m hurdles ===
Games	Gold	Silver	Bronze
1951 New Delhi	Ng Liang Chiang (SIN)	Michitaka Kinami (JPN)	Lloyd Valberg (SIN)
1954 Manila	Sarwan Singh (IND)	Yukiyoshi Kawata (JPN)	Takehiko Nakajima (JPN)
1958 Tokyo	Ghulam Raziq (PAK)	Yang Chuan-kwang (ROC)	Hirokazu Yasuda (JPN)
1962 Jakarta	Mohammad Sarengat (INA)	Ghulam Raziq (PAK)	Hirokazu Yasuda (JPN)
1966 Bangkok	Ghulam Raziq (PAK)	Yoshinobu Hamada (JPN)	Ishtiaq Mubarak (MAL)
1970 Bangkok	Chikashi Watanabe (JPN)	Roddy Lee (ROC)	Bancha Ramaratana (THA)
1974 Tehran	Cui Lin (CHN)	Ishtiaq Mubarak (MAL)	Nasr Sultan (IRQ)
1978 Bangkok	Wang Xunhua (CHN)	Yoshifumi Fujimori (JPN)	Satbir Singh (IND)
1982 New Delhi	Yoshifumi Fujimori (JPN)	Zhang Shensheng (CHN)	Praveen Jolly (IND)
1986 Seoul	Yu Zhicheng (CHN)	Lu Quanbin (CHN)	Kim Jin-tae (KOR)
1990 Beijing	Yu Zhicheng (CHN)	Toshihiko Iwasaki (JPN)	Kimihiro Kaneko (JPN)
1994 Hiroshima	Li Tong (CHN)	Chen Yanhao (CHN)	Nur Herman Majid (MAS)
1998 Bangkok	Chen Yanhao (CHN)	Andrey Sklyarenko (KAZ)	Hamad Mubarak Al-Dosari (QAT)
2002 Busan	Liu Xiang (CHN)	Satoru Tanigawa (JPN)	Park Tae-kyong (KOR)
2006 Doha	Liu Xiang (CHN)	Shi Dongpeng (CHN)	Masato Naito (JPN)
2010 Guangzhou	Liu Xiang (CHN)	Shi Dongpeng (CHN)	Park Tae-kyong (KOR)
2014 Incheon	Xie Wenjun (CHN)	Kim Byoung-jun (KOR)	Jamras Rittidet (THA)
2018 Jakarta–Palembang	Xie Wenjun (CHN)	Chen Kuei-ru (TPE)	Shunya Takayama (JPN)
2022 Hangzhou	Shunya Takayama (JPN)	Shared gold	Xu Zhuoyi (CHN)
2022 Hangzhou	Yaqoub Al-Youha (KUW)	Shared gold	Xu Zhuoyi (CHN)
2026 Aichi–Nagoya	Chen Yuanjiang (CHN)	Rachid Muratake (JPN)	John Tolentino (PHI)

=== 400 m hurdles ===
Games	Gold	Silver	Bronze
1951 New Delhi	Eitaro Okano (JPN)	Teja Singh (IND)	Ng Liang Chiang (SIN)
1954 Manila	Mirza Khan (PAK)	Chan Onn Leng (SIN)	Jaime Pimentel (PHI)
1958 Tokyo	Tsai Cheng-fu (ROC)	Keiji Ogushi (JPN)	Yang Chuan-kwang (ROC)
1962 Jakarta	Keiji Ogushi (JPN)	Keiki Iijima (JPN)	Karu Selvaratnam (MAL)
1966 Bangkok	Kiyoo Yui (JPN)	Kazuhiko Itagaki (JPN)	Andyappan Nathan (MAL)
1970 Bangkok	Yukitaka Shigeta (JPN)	Roddy Lee (ROC)	Norman Brinkworth (PAK)
1974 Tehran	Talib Faisal (IRQ)	Abdullatif Abbas (KUW)	Lehmber Singh (IND)
1978 Bangkok	Hassan Kadhim (IRQ)	Takashi Nagao (JPN)	Talib Faisal (IRQ)
1982 New Delhi	Takashi Nagao (JPN)	Shigenori Omori (JPN)	Ahmed Hamada (BRN)
1986 Seoul	Ahmed Hamada (BRN)	Ryoichi Yoshida (JPN)	Jasem Al-Dowaila (KUW)
1990 Beijing	Ghulam Abbas (PAK)	Hwang Hong-chul (KOR)	Gao Yonghong (CHN)
1994 Hiroshima	Shunji Karube (JPN)	Yoshihiko Saito (JPN)	Ali Ismail Doka (QAT)
1998 Bangkok	Hideaki Kawamura (JPN)	Yoshihiko Saito (JPN)	Chen Tien-wen (TPE)
2002 Busan	Hadi Soua'an Al-Somaily (KSA)	Mubarak Al-Nubi (QAT)	Dai Tamesue (JPN)
2006 Doha	Kenji Narisako (JPN)	Meng Yan (CHN)	Naohiro Kawakita (JPN)
2010 Guangzhou	Joseph Abraham (IND)	Bandar Sharahili (KSA)	Naohiro Kawakita (JPN)
2014 Incheon	Ali Khamis (BRN)	Takayuki Kishimoto (JPN)	Cheng Wen (CHN)
2018 Jakarta–Palembang	Abderrahman Samba (QAT)	Dharun Ayyasamy (IND)	Takatoshi Abe (JPN)
2022 Hangzhou	Abderrahman Samba (QAT)	Bassem Hemeida (QAT)	Xie Zhiyu (CHN)
2026 Aichi–Nagoya	Bassem Hemeida (QAT)	Taiju Goto (JPN)	Lin Chung-wei (TPE)

=== 3000 m steeplechase ===
Games	Gold	Silver	Bronze
1951 New Delhi	Susumu Takahashi (JPN)	Ali Baghbanbashi (IRN)	Ajit Singh (IND)
1954 Manila	Susumu Takahashi (JPN)	Yasumasa Shirasagi (JPN)	Dalu Ram (IND)
1958 Tokyo	Mubarak Shah (PAK)	Masayuki Nunogami (JPN)	Susumu Takahashi (JPN)
1962 Jakarta	Mubarak Shah (PAK)	Saburo Yokomizo (JPN)	Zenji Okuzawa (JPN)
1966 Bangkok	Taketsugu Saruwatari (JPN)	Ahmad Mirhosseini (IRN)	Nobuyoshi Matsuda (JPN)
1970 Bangkok	Nobuyoshi Miura (JPN)	Susumu Noro (JPN)	Gurmej Singh (IND)
1974 Tehran	Takaharu Koyama (JPN)	Gurmej Singh (IND)	Li Wenliang (CHN)
1978 Bangkok	Masanari Shintaku (JPN)	Gopal Saini (IND)	Hitoshi Iwabuchi (JPN)
1982 New Delhi	Tadasu Kawano (JPN)	Gopal Saini (IND)	Hector Begeo (PHI)
1986 Seoul	Shigeyuki Aikyo (JPN)	Cheng Shouguo (CHN)	Hajime Nagasato (JPN)
1990 Beijing	Kazuhito Yamada (JPN)	Deena Ram (IND)	Niu Xinxiang (CHN)
1994 Hiroshima	Sun Ripeng (CHN)	Saad Al-Asmari (KSA)	Yasunori Uchitomi (JPN)
1998 Bangkok	Yasunori Uchitomi (JPN)	Hamid Sajjadi (IRI)	Jafar Babakhani (IRI)
2002 Busan	Khamis Abdullah Saifeldin (QAT)	Yoshitaka Iwamizu (JPN)	Shared silver
2002 Busan	Khamis Abdullah Saifeldin (QAT)	Abubaker Ali Kamal (QAT)	Shared silver
2006 Doha	Tareq Mubarak Taher (BRN)	Gamal Belal Salem (QAT)	Lin Xiangqian (CHN)
2010 Guangzhou	Tareq Mubarak Taher (BRN)	Thamer Kamal Ali (QAT)	Ali Al-Amri (KSA)
2014 Incheon	Abubaker Ali Kamal (QAT)	Tareq Mubarak Taher (BRN)	Naveen Kumar (IND)
2018 Jakarta–Palembang	Hossein Keyhani (IRI)	Yaser Bagharab (QAT)	Kazuya Shiojiri (JPN)
2022 Hangzhou	Avinash Sable (IND)	Ryoma Aoki (JPN)	Seiya Sunada (JPN)
2026 Aichi–Nagoya	Ryuji Miura (JPN)	Ryoma Aoki (JPN)	Zakaria El-Ahlaami (QAT)

=== 4 × 100 m relay ===
Games	Gold	Silver	Bronze
1951 New Delhi	Japan (JPN); Masaji Tajima; Toshihiro Ohashi; Tomio Hosoda; Kazuta Ikoma	India (IND); Alfred Shamin; Ram Swaroop; Marian Gabriel; Lavy Pinto	Philippines (PHI); Bernabe Lovina; Jovencio Ardina; Tito Almagro; Genaro Cabrera
1954 Manila	Japan (JPN); Masaji Tajima; Yoshihiro Takatani; Tomio Hosoda; Akira Kiyofuji	Pakistan (PAK); Muhammad Sharif Butt; Abdul Aziz; Abdul Khaliq; Khwaja Muhammad Aslam	Philippines (PHI); Gaspar Azares; Eusebio Ensong; Pedro Subido; Genaro Cabrera
1958 Tokyo	Philippines (PHI); Remegio Vista; Isaac Gomez; Pedro Subido; Enrique Bautista	Japan (JPN); Kyohei Ushio; Masaru Kamata; Yoshiaki Hara; Yasuhiro Yanagi	Pakistan (PAK); Muhammad Sharif Butt; Ghulam Raziq; Muhammad Ramzan Ali; Abdul Khaliq
1962 Jakarta	Philippines (PHI); Remegio Vista; Isaac Gomez; Claro Pellosis; Rogelio Onofre	Japan (JPN); Kiyoshi Asai; Takeo Tamura; Takayuki Okazaki; Hideo Iijima	Malaya (MAL); Mani Jegathesan; V. Vijiaratnam; Shahrudin Mohd Ali; Thor Gim Soon
1966 Bangkok	Malaysia (MAL); Mohd Ariffin Ahmad; Thambu Krishnan; Rajalingam Gunaratnam; Mani Jegathesan	Indonesia (INA); Jootje Pesak Oroh; Soepardi; Bambamg Wahjudi; Agus Sugiri	Philippines (PHI); William Mordeno; Remegio Vista; Arnulfo Valles; Rogelio Onofre
1970 Bangkok	Thailand (THA); Panus Ariyamongkol; Kanoksak Chaisanont; Somsak Thongsuk; Anat Ratanapol	Japan (JPN); Kiyoshi Shimada; Hiromitsu Inomata; Chiaki Miyakawa; Masahide Jinno	India (IND); O. L. Thomas; Kenneth Powell; A. P. Ramaswamy; Ramesh Tawde
1974 Tehran	Thailand (THA); Somsak Boontud; Suchart Jairsuraparp; Kanoksak Chaisanont; Anat Ratanapol	China (CHN); Feng Zhenren; Luo Guoming; Cui Lin; Yu Weili	Singapore (SIN); C. Kunalan; Ong Yoke Phee; Tan Say Leong; Yeo Kian Chye
1978 Bangkok	Thailand (THA); Somsak Boontud; Suchart Jairsuraparp; Kanoksak Chaisanont; Anat Ratanapol	Japan (JPN); Yasuhiro Harada; Junichi Usui; Susumu Shimizu; Akira Harada	China (CHN); Yuan Guoqiang; Fan Xinwen; Zhao Jingyu; Zou Zhenxian
1982 New Delhi	China (CHN); Wang Shaoming; He Baodong; Yu Zhuanghui; Yuan Guoqiang	Thailand (THA); Somsak Boontud; Suchart Jairsuraparp; Prasit Boonprasert; Sumet Promna	Japan (JPN); Yoshihiro Shimizu; Toshio Toyota; Junichi Usui; Kazunori Asaba
1986 Seoul	China (CHN); Cai Jianming; Li Feng; Yu Zhuanghui; Zheng Chen	Japan (JPN); Hideyuki Arikawa; Hirofumi Miyazaki; Hirofumi Koike; Hiroki Fuwa	South Korea (KOR); Sung Nak-kun; Jang Jae-keun; Kim Jong-il; Shim Duk-sup
1990 Beijing	China (CHN); Wu Jianhui; Cai Jianming; Zhao Cunlin; Zheng Chen	Chinese Taipei (TPE); Lai Cheng-chuan; Lin Ching-hsiung; Cheng Hsin-fu; Hsieh Tzong-tze	Japan (JPN); Hisatsugu Suzuki; Susumu Takano; Yuji Mochizuki; Katsutoshi Iwasa
1994 Hiroshima	Japan (JPN); Tetsuya Nakamura; Yoshitaka Ito; Satoru Inoue; Koji Ito	China (CHN); Ye Hu; Chen Wenzhong; Huang Danwei; Huang Geng	Qatar (QAT); Saad Muftah Al-Kuwari; Masoud Khamis Rahman; Sultan Al-Sheib; Talal Mansour
1998 Bangkok	Japan (JPN); Yasukatsu Otsuki; Shin Kubota; Hiroyasu Tsuchie; Koji Ito/>GR	Thailand (THA); Niti Piyapan; Reanchai Seeharwong; Worasit Vechaphut; Vissanu Sophanich	Oman (OMA); Hamoud Al-Dalhami; Mohammed Al-Hooti; Jahad Al-Sheikh; Ahmed Al-Moamari
2002 Busan	Thailand (THA); Reanchai Seeharwong; Vissanu Sophanich; Ekkachai Janthana; Sittichai Suwonprateep	Japan (JPN); Hisashi Miyazaki; Shingo Suetsugu; Hiroyasu Tsuchie; Nobuharu Asahara	China (CHN); Shen Yunbao; Chen Haijian; Yin Hanzhao; Han Chaoming
2006 Doha	Thailand (THA); Seksan Wongsala; Wachara Sondee; Ekkachai Janthana; Sittichai Suwonprateep	Japan (JPN); Naoki Tsukahara; Shingo Suetsugu; Yusuke Omae; Shinji Takahira	China (CHN); Wen Yongyi; Pang Guibin; Yang Yaozu; Hu Kai
2010 Guangzhou	China (CHN); Lu Bin; Liang Jiahong; Su Bingtian; Lao Yi	Chinese Taipei (TPE); Wang Wen-tang; Liu Yuan-kai; Tsai Meng-lin; Yi Wei-chen	Thailand (THA); Poommanus Jankem; Wachara Sondee; Jirapong Meenapra; Sittichai Suwonprateep
2014 Incheon	China (CHN); Chen Shiwei; Xie Zhenye; Su Bingtian; Zhang Peimeng; Yang Yang; Mo Youxue	Japan (JPN); Ryota Yamagata; Shota Iizuka; Shinji Takahira; Kei Takase; Shota Hara	Hong Kong (HKG); Tang Yik Chun; So Chun Hong; Ng Ka Fung; Tsui Chi Ho; Lai Chun Ho
2018 Jakarta–Palembang	Japan (JPN); Ryota Yamagata; Shuhei Tada; Yoshihide Kiryu; Asuka Cambridge	Indonesia (INA); Mohammad Fadlin; Lalu Muhammad Zohri; Eko Rimbawan; Bayu Kertanegara	China (CHN); Xu Haiyang; Mi Hong; Su Bingtian; Xu Zhouzheng
2022 Hangzhou	China (CHN); Chen Guanfeng; Xie Zhenye; Yan Haibin; Chen Jiapeng	Japan (JPN); Yoshihide Kiryu; Yuki Koike; Koki Ueyama; Shoto Uno	South Korea (KOR); Lee Jeong-tae; Kim Kuk-young; Lee Jae-seong; Ko Seung-hwan; Park Won-jin
2026 Aichi–Nagoya	China (CHN); Chen Jinfeng; Keli Zeng; Wang Shengjie; Xie Zhenye	Chinese Taipei (TPE); Lai Po-hsiang; Chen Wen-pu; Huang Tso-chun; Yang Chun-han	South Korea (KOR); Seo Min-jun; Joeljin Nwamadi; Lee Jae-seong; Daniel Biwesa

=== 4 × 400 m relay ===
Games	Gold	Silver	Bronze
1951 New Delhi	India (IND); Govind Singh; Amit Singh Bakshi; Balwant Singh; Karan Singh	Japan (JPN); Yorio Mizuyoke; Ichiro Tao; Fumio Nishiuchi; Eitaro Okano	Philippines (PHI); Bernabe Lovina; Bienvenido Llaneta; Tomas Bennet; Genaro Cabrera
1954 Manila	Japan (JPN); Akira Matsui; Yoshitaka Muroya; Nobuaki Matsuno; Kanji Akagi	India (IND); J. B. Joseph; Ivan Jacob; Joginder Singh Dhanaor; Harjeet Singh	Philippines (PHI); Mauricio Paubaya; Ernesto Rodriguez; Cipriano Nuera; Pablo Somblingo
1958 Tokyo	Japan (JPN); Kanji Akagi; Keiji Ogushi; Takejiro Hayashi; Yoshitaka Muroya	Republic of China (ROC); Chen Ying-long; Chen Huey-kuen; Chen Lo-chen; Tsai Cheng-fu	Philippines (PHI); Aparicio Mequi; Erasma Arellano; Antonio Suplido; Pablo Somblingo
1962 Jakarta	India (IND); Daljit Singh; Jagdish Singh; Makhan Singh; Milkha Singh	Malaya (MAL); Karu Selvaratnam; Abdul Rahim Ahmad; Asir Victor; Mani Jegathesan	Japan (JPN); Kimitada Hayase; Keiji Ogushi; Mamoru Morimoto; Keiki Iijima
1966 Bangkok	Japan (JPN); Toru Honda; Masami Yoshida; Yoshinori Sakai; Kiyoo Yui	Malaysia (MAL); Asir Victor; Rengan Pakkri; Andyappan Nathan; Thambu Krishnan	Singapore (SIN); Natahar Bava; Ho Mun Cheong; Gunasena Migale; C. Kunalan
1970 Bangkok	Japan (JPN); Hiroshi Waku; Kiyoshi Shimada; Hiromitsu Inomata; Yoshiharu Tomonaga	India (IND); Bhogeswar Baruah; P. C. Punappa; Sucha Singh; Ajmer Singh	Malaysia (MAL); Asir Victor; Hassan Osman; Jayabalan Karuppiah; Thambu Krishnan
1974 Tehran	Sri Lanka (SRI); Appunidage Premachandra; Sunil Gunawardene; Kosala Sahabandu; Wickremasinghe Wimaladasa	India (IND); P. C. Punappa; Lehmber Singh; Sucha Singh; Sriram Singh	Iran (IRN); Houshang Arshadi; Fakhroddin Alamshah; Ghasem Koveitipour; Reza Entezari
1978 Bangkok	Japan (JPN); Eiji Natori; Junichi Usui; Yasuhiro Harada; Takashi Nagao	India (IND); Murali Kuttan; Harkamaljit Singh; Uday K. Prabhu; Sriram Singh	Iraq (IRQ); Talib Faisal; Abbas Laibi; Hassan Kadhim; Fahim Abdul-Sada
1982 New Delhi	Japan (JPN); Kazunori Asaba; Shigenori Omori; Hiromi Kawasumi; Junichi Usui	Iraq (IRQ); Hussein Ali; Abbas Laibi; Hussein Ali; Aouf Abdul-Rahman	China (CHN); Yuan Guoqiang; He Baodong; Tan Honghai; Guo Shunqi
1986 Seoul	Japan (JPN); Koichi Konakatomi; Kenji Yamauchi; Hiromi Kawasumi; Susumu Takano	Iraq (IRQ); Aouf Abdul-Rahman; Ziad Ali; Abbas Ali; Fahim Abdul-Sada	Philippines (PHI); Romeo Gido; Honesto Larce; Leopoldo Arnillo; Isidro del Prado
1990 Beijing	Japan (JPN); Koichi Konakatomi; Katsutoshi Iwasa; Yoji Mochizuki; Takahiro Watanabe	Qatar (QAT); Sami Al-Abdullah; Nasser Ahmed; Ibrahim Ismail Muftah; Ismail Mohamed Youssef	China (CHN); Liang Bohua; Tan Guoheng; Chen Jingzhong; Yu Baoyi
1994 Hiroshima	South Korea (KOR); Lee Yun-hak; Shon Ju-il; Lee Jin-il; Kim Soon-hyung	Thailand (THA); Yuthana Thonglek; Chanon Keanchan; Sarapong Kumsup; Aktawat Sakoolchan	Qatar (QAT); Hamad Mubarak Al-Dosari; Fareh Ibrahim Ali; Ali Ismail Doka; Ibrahim Ismail Muftah
1998 Bangkok	Japan (JPN); Shunji Karube; Jun Osakada; Masayoshi Kan; Kenji Tabata	India (IND); Purukottam Ramachandran; Jata Shankar; Lijo David Thottan; Paramjit Singh	South Korea (KOR); Kim Jae-da; Kim Yong-hwan; Kim Ho; Shon Ju-il
2002 Busan	Saudi Arabia (KSA); Hamed Al-Bishi; Hadi Soua'an Al-Somaily; Mohammed Al-Salhi; Hamdan Al-Bishi	India (IND); Purukottam Ramachandran; K. J. Manoj Lal; Satvir Singh; Bhupinder Singh	Sri Lanka (SRI); Rohan Pradeep Kumara; Ranga Wimalawansa; Prasanna Amarasekara; Sugath Thilakaratne
2006 Doha	Saudi Arabia (KSA); Ismail Al-Sabiani; Hamed Al-Bishi; Mohammed Al-Salhi; Hamdan Al-Bishi	India (IND); Aboo Backer; Joseph Abraham; Bhupinder Singh; K. M. Binu	Sri Lanka (SRI); Rohan Pradeep Kumara; Rohitha Pushpakumara; Prasanna Amarasekara; Ashoka Jayasundara
2010 Guangzhou	Saudi Arabia (KSA); Ismail Al-Sabiani; Mohammed Al-Salhi; Hamed Al-Bishi; Yousef Masrahi	Japan (JPN); Yusuke Ishitsuka; Kenji Fujimitsu; Hideyuki Hirose; Yuzo Kanemaru	China (CHN); Lin Yang; Deng Shijie; Chang Pengben; Liu Xiaosheng
2014 Incheon	Japan (JPN); Yuzo Kanemaru; Kenji Fujimitsu; Shota Iizuka; Nobuya Kato; Shinji Takahira	South Korea (KOR); Park Se-jung; Park Bong-go; Seong Hyeok-je; Yeo Ho-sua; Choi Dong-baek	Saudi Arabia (KSA); Ismail Al-Sabiani; Ahmed Al-Khayri; Mohammed Al-Bishi; Yousef Masrahi
2018 Jakarta–Palembang	Qatar (QAT); Abderrahman Samba; Mohamed Nasir Abbas; Mohamed El-Nour; Abdalelah Haroun	India (IND); Kunhu Muhammed; Dharun Ayyasamy; Muhammed Anas; Arokia Rajiv; K. S. Jeevan; Jithu Baby	Japan (JPN); Julian Walsh; Yuki Koike; Takatoshi Abe; Shota Iizuka; Jun Kimura; Sho Kawamoto
2022 Hangzhou	India (IND); Muhammed Anas; Amoj Jacob; Muhammad Ajmal Variyathodi; Rajesh Ramesh; Nihal William; Mijo Chacko Kurian	Qatar (QAT); Abderrahman Samba; Ashraf Osman; Ismail Abakar; Bassem Hemeida; Ammar Ibrahim; Amar Ebed	Sri Lanka (SRI); Aruna Darshana; Pabasara Niku; Rajitha Rajakaruna; Kalinga Kumarage; Dinuka Deshan; Pasindu Kodikara
2026 Aichi–Nagoya	Japan (JPN); Fuga Sato; Shinya Hayashi; Kenki Imaizumi; Yuki Joseph Nakajima	Qatar (QAT); Ammar Ibrahim; Bassem Hemeida; Youssouf Djibrine; Ismail Abakar	India (IND); Dharmeveer Choudhary; Manu Thekkinalil; Jay Kumar; Vishal Thennarasu

=== Marathon ===
Games	Gold	Silver	Bronze
1951 New Delhi	Chhota Singh (IND)	Katsuo Nishida (JPN)	Surat Mathur (IND)
1958 Tokyo	Lee Chang-hoon (KOR)	Myitung Naw (BIR)	Nobuyoshi Sadanaga (JPN)
1962 Jakarta	Masayuki Nagata (JPN)	Muhammad Yousaf (PAK)	Myitung Naw (BIR)
1966 Bangkok	Kenji Kimihara (JPN)	Morio Shigematsu (JPN)	Lee Sang-hoon (KOR)
1970 Bangkok	Kenji Kimihara (JPN)	Yoshiro Mifune (JPN)	Kang Myung-kwang (KOR)
1978 Bangkok	Mineteru Sakamoto (JPN)	Choe Chang-sop (PRK)	Koh Chun-son (PRK)
1982 New Delhi	Kim Yang-kon (KOR)	Fumiaki Abe (JPN)	Hosur Kukkappa Seetarama (IND)
1986 Seoul	Takeyuki Nakayama (JPN)	Hiromi Taniguchi (JPN)	Yoo Jae-sung (KOR)
1990 Beijing	Kim Won-tak (KOR)	Satoru Shimizu (JPN)	Choi Chol-ho (PRK)
1994 Hiroshima	Hwang Young-cho (KOR)	Toshiyuki Hayata (JPN)	Kim Jae-ryong (KOR)
1998 Bangkok	Lee Bong-ju (KOR)	Akira Manai (JPN)	Kim Jung-won (PRK)
2002 Busan	Lee Bong-ju (KOR)	Koji Shimizu (JPN)	Ryuji Takei (JPN)
2006 Doha	Mubarak Hassan Shami (QAT)	Khalid Kamal Yaseen (BRN)	Satoshi Osaki (JPN)
2010 Guangzhou	Ji Young-jun (KOR)	Yukihiro Kitaoka (JPN)	Mubarak Hassan Shami (QAT)
2014 Incheon	Hasan Mahboob (BRN)	Kohei Matsumura (JPN)	Yuki Kawauchi (JPN)
2018 Jakarta–Palembang	Hiroto Inoue (JPN)	El-Hassan El-Abbassi (BRN)	Duo Bujie (CHN)
2022 Hangzhou	He Jie (CHN)	Han Il-ryong (PRK)	Yang Shaohui (CHN)
2026 Aichi-Nagoya	Ichitaka Yamashita (JPN)	Sawan Barwal (IND)	Feng Peiyou (CHN)

=== Half marathon race walk ===
Games	Gold	Silver	Bronze
2026 Aichi-Nagoya	Shi Shengji (CHN)	Toshikazu Yamanishi (JPN)	Choe Byeong-kwang (KOR)

=== Marathon race walk ===
Games	Gold	Silver	Bronze
2026 Aichi-Nagoya	Hayato Katsuki (JPN)	Zhou Yingcheng (CHN)	Motofumi Suwa (JPN)

=== 10,000 m walk ===
Games	Gold	Silver	Bronze
1951 New Delhi	Mahabir Prasad (IND)	Takeo Sato (JPN)	Kesar Singh (IND)

=== 20 km walk ===
Games	Gold	Silver	Bronze
1978 Bangkok	Hakam Singh (IND)	Vellasamy Subramaniam (MAL)	Khoo Chong Beng (MAL)
1982 New Delhi	Siri Chand Ram (IND)	Wang Chuntang (CHN)	Zhang Fuxin (CHN)
1986 Seoul	Sun Xiaoguang (CHN)	Jiang Shaohong (CHN)	Siri Chand Ram (IND)
1990 Beijing	Mao Xinyuan (CHN)	Hirofumi Sakai (JPN)	Li Mingcai (CHN)
1994 Hiroshima	Chen Shaoguo (CHN)	Bu Lingtang (CHN)	Valeriy Borisov (KAZ)
1998 Bangkok	Yu Guohui (CHN)	Valeriy Borisov (KAZ)	Li Zewen (CHN)
2002 Busan	Valeriy Borisov (KAZ)	Yu Chaohong (CHN)	Satoshi Yanagisawa (JPN)
2006 Doha	Han Yucheng (CHN)	Kim Hyun-sub (KOR)	Koichiro Morioka (JPN)
2010 Guangzhou	Wang Hao (CHN)	Chu Yafei (CHN)	Kim Hyun-sub (KOR)
2014 Incheon	Wang Zhen (CHN)	Yusuke Suzuki (JPN)	Kim Hyun-sub (KOR)
2018 Jakarta–Palembang	Wang Kaihua (CHN)	Toshikazu Yamanishi (JPN)	Jin Xiangqian (CHN)
2022 Hangzhou	Zhang Jun (CHN)	Wang Zhaozhao (CHN)	Yutaro Murayama (JPN)

=== 50 km walk ===
Games	Gold	Silver	Bronze
1951 New Delhi	Bakhtawar Singh (IND)	B. Das (IND)	Takeo Sato (JPN)
1982 New Delhi	Wang Chuntang (CHN)	Qiu Shiyong (CHN)	Akira Fujisaki (JPN)
1990 Beijing	Zhou Zhaowen (CHN)	Zhai Wanbo (CHN)	Tadahiro Kosaka (JPN)
1994 Hiroshima	Sergey Korepanov (KAZ)	Fumio Imamura (JPN)	Tadahiro Kosaka (JPN)
1998 Bangkok	Wang Yinhang (CHN)	Sergey Korepanov (KAZ)	Fumio Imamura (JPN)
2010 Guangzhou	Si Tianfeng (CHN)	Li Lei (CHN)	Koichiro Morioka (JPN)
2014 Incheon	Takayuki Tanii (JPN)	Park Chil-sung (KOR)	Wang Zhendong (CHN)
2018 Jakarta–Palembang	Hayato Katsuki (JPN)	Wang Qin (CHN)	Joo Hyun-myeong (KOR)

=== High jump ===
Games	Gold	Silver	Bronze
1951 New Delhi	Andres Franco (PHI)	Yukio Ishikawa (JPN)	Maram Sudarmodjo (INA)
1954 Manila	Ajit Singh Balla (IND)	Yukio Ishikawa (JPN)	Andres Franco (PHI)
1958 Tokyo	Nagalingam Ethirveerasingam (CEY)	Noboru Kasamatsu (JPN)	Yukio Ishikawa (JPN)
1962 Jakarta	Kuniyoshi Sugioka (JPN)	Nagalingam Ethirveerasingam (CEY)	Ciriaco Baronda (PHI)
1966 Bangkok	Bhim Singh (IND)	Osamu Shimizu (JPN)	Teymour Ghiasi (IRN)
1970 Bangkok	Teymour Ghiasi (IRN)	Hidehiko Tomizawa (JPN)	Bhim Singh (IND)
1974 Tehran	Teymour Ghiasi (IRN)	Ni Zhiqin (CHN)	Yoshikazu Okuda (JPN)
1978 Bangkok	Takao Sakamoto (JPN)	Kazunori Koshikawa (JPN)	Cui Hongjun (CHN)
1982 New Delhi	Zhu Jianhua (CHN)	Cai Shu (CHN)	Takao Sakamoto (JPN)
1986 Seoul	Zhu Jianhua (CHN)	Liu Yunpeng (CHN)	Shuji Ujino (JPN)
1990 Beijing	Zhou Zhongge (CHN)	Liu Yunpeng (CHN)	Takahisa Yoshida (JPN)
1990 Beijing	Zhou Zhongge (CHN)	Liu Yunpeng (CHN)	Cho Hyun-wook (KOR)
1990 Beijing	Zhou Zhongge (CHN)	Liu Yunpeng (CHN)	Abdullah Al-Sheib (QAT)
1990 Beijing	Zhou Zhongge (CHN)	Liu Yunpeng (CHN)	Liao Hsueh-sung (TPE)
1994 Hiroshima	Takahisa Yoshida (JPN)	Lee Jin-taek (KOR)	Xu Yang (CHN)
1998 Bangkok	Lee Jin-taek (KOR)	Zhou Zhongge (CHN)	Shigeki Toyoshima (JPN)
1998 Bangkok	Lee Jin-taek (KOR)	Zhou Zhongge (CHN)	Loo Kum Zee (MAS)
2002 Busan	Lee Jin-taek (KOR)	Cui Kai (CHN)	Shared silver
2002 Busan	Lee Jin-taek (KOR)	Wang Zhouzhou (CHN)	Shared silver
2002 Busan	Lee Jin-taek (KOR)	Kim Tae-hoi (KOR)	Shared silver
2006 Doha	Jean-Claude Rabbath (LIB)	Sergey Zasimovich (KAZ)	Naoyuki Daigo (JPN)
2010 Guangzhou	Mutaz Barsham (QAT)	Hiromi Takahari (JPN)	Huang Haiqiang (CHN)
2010 Guangzhou	Mutaz Barsham (QAT)	Hiromi Takahari (JPN)	Vitaliy Tsykunov (KAZ)
2010 Guangzhou	Mutaz Barsham (QAT)	Hiromi Takahari (JPN)	Rashid Al-Mannai (QAT)
2014 Incheon	Mutaz Barsham (QAT)	Zhang Guowei (CHN)	Muamer Barsham (QAT)
2018 Jakarta–Palembang	Wang Yu (CHN)	Woo Sang-hyeok (KOR)	Naoto Tobe (JPN)
2018 Jakarta–Palembang	Wang Yu (CHN)	Woo Sang-hyeok (KOR)	Majdeddin Ghazal (SYR)
2022 Hangzhou	Mutaz Barsham (QAT)	Woo Sang-hyeok (KOR)	Tomohiro Shinno (JPN)
2026 Aichi–Nagoya	Fu Chao-hsuan (TPE)	Sarvesh Kushare (IND)	Woo Sang-hyeok (KOR)

=== Pole vault ===
Games	Gold	Silver	Bronze
1951 New Delhi	Bunkichi Sawada (JPN)	M. A. Akbar (CEY)	Shuhei Nishida (JPN)
1954 Manila	Bunkichi Sawada (JPN)	Toyokichi Matsumoto (JPN)	Lai Yu-tao (ROC)
1958 Tokyo	Noriaki Yasuda (JPN)	Kozo Akasaka (JPN)	Allah Ditta (PAK)
1962 Jakarta	Hisao Morita (JPN)	Kuniaki Yamazaki (JPN)	Allah Ditta (PAK)
1966 Bangkok	Tetsuo Hirota (JPN)	Yoshizo Uryu (JPN)	Hong Sang-pyo (KOR)
1970 Bangkok	Kyoichiro Inoue (JPN)	Masanori Araya (JPN)	Hong Sang-pyo (KOR)
1974 Tehran	Yasuhiro Kigawa (JPN)	Cai Zhangxi (CHN)	Jiang Yubin (CHN)
1978 Bangkok	Tomomi Takahashi (JPN)	Chen Guanghui (CHN)	Yasuhiro Kigawa (JPN)
1982 New Delhi	Tomomi Takahashi (JPN)	Teruhisa Kamiya (JPN)	Zhang Cheng (CHN)
1986 Seoul	Ji Zebiao (CHN)	Liang Xueren (CHN)	Lee Jae-bok (KOR)
1990 Beijing	Liang Xueren (CHN)	Ge Yun (CHN)	Kim Chul-kyun (KOR)
1994 Hiroshima	Igor Potapovich (KAZ)	Grigoriy Yegorov (KAZ)	Teruyasu Yonekura (JPN)
1994 Hiroshima	Igor Potapovich (KAZ)	Grigoriy Yegorov (KAZ)	Kim Chul-kyun (KOR)
1998 Bangkok	Igor Potapovich (KAZ)	Kim Chul-kyun (KOR)	Fumiaki Kobayashi (JPN)
2002 Busan	Grigoriy Yegorov (KAZ)	Satoru Yasuda (JPN)	Fumiaki Kobayashi (JPN)
2006 Doha	Daichi Sawano (JPN)	Leonid Andreev (UZB)	Yang Yansheng (CHN)
2010 Guangzhou	Yang Yansheng (CHN)	Kim Yoo-suk (KOR)	Shared silver
2010 Guangzhou	Yang Yansheng (CHN)	Leonid Andreev (UZB)	Shared silver
2014 Incheon	Xue Changrui (CHN)	Daichi Sawano (JPN)	Jin Min-sub (KOR)
2018 Jakarta–Palembang	Seito Yamamoto (JPN)	Yao Jie (CHN)	Patsapong Amsam-ang (THA)
2022 Hangzhou	EJ Obiena (PHI)	Huang Bokai (CHN)	Hussain Al-Hizam (KSA)
2026 Aichi–Nagoya	EJ Obiena (PHI)	Yao Jie (CHN)	Li Chenyang (CHN)

=== Long jump ===
Games	Gold	Silver	Bronze
1951 New Delhi	Masaji Tajima (JPN)	Baldev Singh (IND)	Takashi Aso (JPN)
1954 Manila	Noriaki Sagawa (JPN)	Yoshiro Sonoda (JPN)	Lin Te-sheng (ROC)
1958 Tokyo	Suh Yong-joo (KOR)	Yang Chuan-kwang (ROC)	Muhammad Ramzan Ali (PAK)
1962 Jakarta	Takayuki Okazaki (JPN)	Kaihei Oda (JPN)	Awang Papilaya (INA)
1966 Bangkok	Hiroomi Yamada (JPN)	Takayuki Okazaki (JPN)	Su Wen-ho (ROC)
1970 Bangkok	Shinji Ogura (JPN)	Hiroomi Yamada (JPN)	Labh Singh (IND)
1974 Tehran	T. C. Yohannan (IND)	Takayoshi Kawagoe (JPN)	Satish Pillai (IND)
1978 Bangkok	Suresh Babu (IND)	Junichi Usui (JPN)	Toshihisa Yoshimoto (JPN)
1982 New Delhi	Kim Jong-il (KOR)	Liu Yuhuang (CHN)	Junichi Usui (JPN)
1986 Seoul	Kim Jong-il (KOR)	Junichi Usui (JPN)	Chen Zunrong (CHN)
1990 Beijing	Chen Zunrong (CHN)	Huang Geng (CHN)	Lai Cheng-chuan (TPE)
1994 Hiroshima	Huang Geng (CHN)	Huang Baoting (CHN)	Konstantin Sarnatskiy (UZB)
1998 Bangkok	Masaki Morinaga (JPN)	Liu Hongning (CHN)	Abdulrahman Al-Nubi (QAT)
2002 Busan	Hussein Al-Sabee (KSA)	Li Dalong (CHN)	Al-Waleed Abdulla (QAT)
2006 Doha	Hussein Al-Sabee (KSA)	Saleh Al-Haddad (KUW)	Ahmed Faiz (KSA)
2010 Guangzhou	Kim Deok-hyeon (KOR)	Su Xiongfeng (CHN)	Hussein Al-Sabee (KSA)
2014 Incheon	Li Jinzhe (CHN)	Kim Deok-hyeon (KOR)	Gao Xinglong (CHN)
2018 Jakarta–Palembang	Wang Jianan (CHN)	Zhang Yaoguang (CHN)	Sapwaturrahman (INA)
2022 Hangzhou	Wang Jianan (CHN)	Murali Sreeshankar (IND)	Shi Yuhao (CHN)
2026 Aichi–Nagoya	Shi Yuhao (CHN)	Murali Sreeshankar (IND)	Anvar Anvarov (UZB)

=== Triple jump ===
Games	Gold	Silver	Bronze
1951 New Delhi	Yoshio Iimuro (JPN)	Takashi Aso (JPN)	Hendarsin (INA)
1954 Manila	Noriaki Sagawa (JPN)	Yoshio Iimuro (JPN)	Choi Yong-kee (KOR)
1958 Tokyo	Mohinder Singh (IND)	Koji Sakurai (JPN)	Tomio Ota (JPN)
1962 Jakarta	Koji Sakurai (JPN)	Tomio Ota (JPN)	Awang Papilaya (INA)
1966 Bangkok	Kosei Gushiken (JPN)	Satoshi Shimo (JPN)	Labh Singh (IND)
1970 Bangkok	Mohinder Singh Gill (IND)	Labh Singh (IND)	Tsai Teng-lung (ROC)
1974 Tehran	Toshiaki Inoue (JPN)	Mohinder Singh Gill (IND)	Faramarz Asef (IRN)
1978 Bangkok	Masami Nakanishi (JPN)	Zou Zhenxian (CHN)	Zhou Jianguo (CHN)
1982 New Delhi	Zou Zhenxian (CHN)	Yasushi Ueta (JPN)	Sammudi Balasubramaniam (IND)
1986 Seoul	Norifumi Yamashita (JPN)	Park Young-jun (KOR)	Zou Zhenxian (CHN)
1990 Beijing	Chen Yanping (CHN)	Zou Sixin (CHN)	Ryu Jae-kyun (KOR)
1994 Hiroshima	Oleg Sakirkin (KAZ)	Takashi Komatsu (JPN)	Sergey Arzamasov (KAZ)
1998 Bangkok	Sergey Arzamasov (KAZ)	Duan Qifeng (CHN)	Nattaporn Namkanha (THA)
2002 Busan	Salem Al-Ahmadi (KSA)	Lao Jianfeng (CHN)	Takashi Komatsu (JPN)
2006 Doha	Li Yanxi (CHN)	Roman Valiyev (KAZ)	Kim Deok-hyeon (KOR)
2010 Guangzhou	Li Yanxi (CHN)	Yevgeniy Ektov (KAZ)	Cao Shuo (CHN)
2014 Incheon	Cao Shuo (CHN)	Dong Bin (CHN)	Kim Deok-hyeon (KOR)
2018 Jakarta–Palembang	Arpinder Singh (IND)	Ruslan Kurbanov (UZB)	Cao Shuo (CHN)
2022 Hangzhou	Zhu Yaming (CHN)	Fang Yaoqing (CHN)	Praveen Chithravel (IND)
2026 Aichi-Nagoya	Su Wen (CHN)	Manato Miyao (JPN)	Ma Yinglong (CHN)

=== Shot put ===
Games	Gold	Silver	Bronze
1951 New Delhi	Madan Lal (IND)	Sukeo Denda (JPN)	Norimi Sato (JPN)
1954 Manila	Parduman Singh Brar (IND)	Yoshio Kojima (JPN)	Ishar Singh (IND)
1958 Tokyo	Parduman Singh Brar (IND)	Hitoshi Goto (JPN)	Uri Zohar (ISR)
1962 Jakarta	Teruo Itokawa (JPN)	Dinshaw Irani (IND)	Joginder Singh (IND)
1966 Bangkok	Joginder Singh (IND)	Yoshihisa Ishida (JPN)	Jalal Keshmiri (IRN)
1970 Bangkok	Joginder Singh (IND)	Jalal Keshmiri (IRN)	Masazumi Aoki (JPN)
1974 Tehran	Jalal Keshmiri (IRN)	Bahadur Singh Chauhan (IND)	Jugraj Singh (IND)
1978 Bangkok	Bahadur Singh Chauhan (IND)	Zhao Baoqin (CHN)	Mohammad Al-Zinkawi (KUW)
1982 New Delhi	Bahadur Singh Chauhan (IND)	Mohammad Al-Zinkawi (KUW)	Balwinder Singh (IND)
1986 Seoul	Ma Yongfeng (CHN)	Gong Yitian (CHN)	Yoshihisa Urita (JPN)
1990 Beijing	Cheng Shaobo (CHN)	Ma Yongfeng (CHN)	S. D. Eashan (IND)
1994 Hiroshima	Liu Hao (CHN)	Sergey Rubtsov (KAZ)	Xie Shengying (CHN)
1998 Bangkok	Liu Hao (CHN)	Shakti Singh (IND)	Sergey Rubtsov (KAZ)
2002 Busan	Bahadur Singh Sagoo (IND)	Bilal Saad Mubarak (QAT)	Shakti Singh (IND)
2006 Doha	Sultan Al-Hebshi (KSA)	Khalid Habash Al-Suwaidi (QAT)	Chang Ming-huang (TPE)
2010 Guangzhou	Sultan Al-Hebshi (KSA)	Zhang Jun (CHN)	Chang Ming-huang (TPE)
2014 Incheon	Sultan Al-Hebshi (KSA)	Chang Ming-huang (TPE)	Inderjeet Singh (IND)
2018 Jakarta–Palembang	Tajinderpal Singh Toor (IND)	Liu Yang (CHN)	Ivan Ivanov (KAZ)
2022 Hangzhou	Tajinderpal Singh Toor (IND)	Mohammed Tolo (KSA)	Liu Yang (CHN)
2026 Aichi-Nagoya	Mohammadreza Tayebise (IRI)	Tajinderpal Singh Toor (IND)	Mohammed Tolo (KSA)

=== Discus throw ===
Games	Gold	Silver	Bronze
1951 New Delhi	Makhan Singh (IND)	Norimi Sato (JPN)	Aurelio Amante (PHI)
1954 Manila	Parduman Singh Brar (IND)	Chi Pei-lin (ROC)	Liu Ching (ROC)
1958 Tokyo	Balkar Singh (IND)	Muhammad Ayub (PAK)	Parduman Singh Brar (IND)
1962 Jakarta	Shozo Yanagawa (JPN)	Parduman Singh Brar (IND)	Shohei Kaneko (JPN)
1966 Bangkok	Praveen Kumar Sobti (IND)	Jalal Keshmiri (IRN)	Balkar Singh (IND)
1970 Bangkok	Praveen Kumar Sobti (IND)	Jalal Keshmiri (IRN)	Toji Hayashi (JPN)
1974 Tehran	Jalal Keshmiri (IRN)	Praveen Kumar Sobti (IND)	Salman Hesam (IRN)
1978 Bangkok	Li Weinan (CHN)	Li Jianguo (CHN)	Kiyotaka Kawasaki (JPN)
1982 New Delhi	Li Weinan (CHN)	Kuldip Singh (IND)	Li Zheng (CHN)
1986 Seoul	Li Weinan (CHN)	Yuko Maeda (JPN)	Manjit Singh (IND)
1990 Beijing	Zhang Jinglong (CHN)	Wang Daoming (CHN)	Mansour Ghorbani (IRN)
1994 Hiroshima	Zhang Cunbiao (CHN)	Ma Wei (CHN)	Vadim Popov (UZB)
1998 Bangkok	Li Shaojie (CHN)	Anil Kumar (IND)	Zhang Cunbiao (CHN)
2002 Busan	Wu Tao (CHN)	Abbas Samimi (IRI)	Anil Kumar (IND)
2006 Doha	Ehsan Haddadi (IRI)	Rashid Shafi Al-Dosari (QAT)	Sultan Al-Dawoodi (KSA)
2010 Guangzhou	Ehsan Haddadi (IRI)	Mohammad Samimi (IRI)	Vikas Gowda (IND)
2014 Incheon	Ehsan Haddadi (IRI)	Vikas Gowda (IND)	Ahmed Dheeb (QAT)
2018 Jakarta–Palembang	Ehsan Haddadi (IRI)	Mustafa Kadhim (IRQ)	Essa Al-Zenkawi (KUW)
2022 Hangzhou	Hossein Rasouli (IRI)	Ehsan Haddadi (IRI)	Abuduaini Tuergong (CHN)
2026 Aichi-Nagoya	Abuduaini Tuergong (CHN)	Wu Nanjun (CHN)	Sadegh Samimi (IRI)

=== Hammer throw ===
Games	Gold	Silver	Bronze
1951 New Delhi	Fumio Kamamoto (JPN)	Somnath Chopra (IND)	Kishen Singh (IND)
1954 Manila	Yoshio Kojima (JPN)	Muhammad Iqbal (PAK)	Song Kyo-sik (KOR)
1958 Tokyo	Muhammad Iqbal (PAK)	Masaru Urushibata (JPN)	Malik Noor (PAK)
1962 Jakarta	Noboru Okamoto (JPN)	Takeo Sugawara (JPN)	Muhammad Iqbal (PAK)
1966 Bangkok	Takeo Sugawara (JPN)	Shigenobu Murofushi (JPN)	Praveen Kumar Sobti (IND)
1970 Bangkok	Shigenobu Murofushi (JPN)	Yoshihisa Ishida (JPN)	Yousaf Malik (PAK)
1974 Tehran	Shigenobu Murofushi (JPN)	Nirmal Singh Grewal (IND)	Kim Myong-geun (PRK)
1978 Bangkok	Shigenobu Murofushi (JPN)	Yoji Kitano (JPN)	Ji Shaoming (CHN)
1982 New Delhi	Shigenobu Murofushi (JPN)	Masayuki Kawata (JPN)	Xie Yingqi (CHN)
1986 Seoul	Shigenobu Murofushi (JPN)	Luo Jun (CHN)	Lü Dongping (CHN)
1990 Beijing	Bi Zhong (CHN)	Yu Guangming (CHN)	Akiyoshi Ikeda (JPN)
1994 Hiroshima	Bi Zhong (CHN)	Koji Murofushi (JPN)	Aqarab Abbas (PAK)
1998 Bangkok	Koji Murofushi (JPN)	Andrey Abduvaliyev (UZB)	Nikolay Davydov (KGZ)
2002 Busan	Koji Murofushi (JPN)	Hiroaki Doi (JPN)	Ye Kuigang (CHN)
2006 Doha	Dilshod Nazarov (TJK)	Ali Al-Zenkawi (KUW)	Hiroaki Doi (JPN)
2010 Guangzhou	Dilshod Nazarov (TJK)	Kaveh Mousavi (IRI)	Hiroaki Doi (JPN)
2014 Incheon	Dilshod Nazarov (TJK)	Wang Shizhu (CHN)	Wan Yong (CHN)
2018 Jakarta–Palembang	Ashraf Amgad El-Seify (QAT)	Dilshod Nazarov (TJK)	Suhrob Khodjaev (UZB)
2022 Hangzhou	Wang Qi (CHN)	Ashraf Amgad El-Seify (QAT)	Suhrob Khodjaev (UZB)
2026 Aichi-Nagoya	Sukhrob Khodjaev (UZB)	Shota Fukuda (JPN)	Mohammed Al-Dubaisi (KSA)

=== Javelin throw ===
Games	Gold	Silver	Bronze
1951 New Delhi	Haruo Nagayasu (JPN)	Parsa Singh (IND)	Matulessy (INA)
1954 Manila	Muhammad Nawaz (PAK)	Jalal Khan (PAK)	Haruo Nagayasu (JPN)
1958 Tokyo	Muhammad Nawaz (PAK)	Jalal Khan (PAK)	Baruch Feinberg (ISR)
1962 Jakarta	Takashi Miki (JPN)	Muhammad Nawaz (PAK)	Hideta Kanai (JPN)
1966 Bangkok	Nashatar Singh Sidhu (MAL)	Takeshi Ikeda (JPN)	Yumio Miyoshi (JPN)
1970 Bangkok	Hisao Yamamoto (JPN)	Park Soo-kwon (KOR)	Nashatar Singh Sidhu (MAL)
1974 Tehran	Toshihiro Yamada (JPN)	Minoru Onda (JPN)	Zhang Bao (CHN)
1978 Bangkok	Shen Maomao (CHN)	Toshihiko Takeda (JPN)	Ding Penglin (CHN)
1982 New Delhi	Toshihiko Takeda (JPN)	Yang Eun-myung (KOR)	Gurtej Singh (IND)
1986 Seoul	Kazuhiro Mizoguchi (JPN)	Kim Jae-sang (KOR)	Park Jong-sam (KOR)
1990 Beijing	Masami Yoshida (JPN)	Kim Ki-hoon (KOR)	Kazuhiro Mizoguchi (JPN)
1994 Hiroshima	Zhang Lianbiao (CHN)	Vladimir Parfyonov (UZB)	Viktor Zaytsev (UZB)
1998 Bangkok	Sergey Voynov (UZB)	Zhang Lianbiao (CHN)	Li Rongxiang (CHN)
2002 Busan	Li Rongxiang (CHN)	Yukifumi Murakami (JPN)	Sergey Voynov (UZB)
2006 Doha	Park Jae-myong (KOR)	Yukifumi Murakami (JPN)	Li Rongxiang (CHN)
2010 Guangzhou	Yukifumi Murakami (JPN)	Park Jae-myong (KOR)	Rinat Tarzumanov (UZB)
2014 Incheon	Zhao Qinggang (CHN)	Ryohei Arai (JPN)	Ivan Zaytsev (UZB)
2018 Jakarta–Palembang	Neeraj Chopra (IND)	Liu Qizhen (CHN)	Arshad Nadeem (PAK)
2022 Hangzhou	Neeraj Chopra (IND)	Kishore Jena (IND)	Genki Dean (JPN)
2026 Aichi–Nagoya	Rumesh Pathirage (SRI)	Yashvir Singh (IND)	Rohit Yadav (IND)

=== Decathlon ===
Games	Gold	Silver	Bronze
1951 New Delhi	Fumio Nishiuchi (JPN)	Bunkichi Sawada (JPN)	Khurshid Ahmed (IND)
1954 Manila	Yang Chuan-kwang (ROC)	Fumio Nishiuchi (JPN)	Ronnie O'Brien (IND)
1958 Tokyo	Yang Chuan-kwang (ROC)	Kiyoshi Katsuki (JPN)	Shosuke Suzuki (JPN)
1962 Jakarta	Gurbachan Singh Randhawa (IND)	Shosuke Suzuki (JPN)	Cyril Perera (MAL)
1966 Bangkok	Wu Ah-min (ROC)	Yukuo Nogami (JPN)	Hiroomi Yamada (JPN)
1970 Bangkok	Junichi Onizuka (JPN)	M. G. Shetty (IND)	Wang Ying-shih (ROC)
1974 Tehran	Vijay Singh Chauhan (IND)	Junichi Onizuka (JPN)	Suresh Babu (IND)
1978 Bangkok	Hisashi Iwai (JPN)	Prapant Srisathorn (THA)	Jin Xuewei (CHN)
1982 New Delhi	Weng Kangqiang (CHN)	Zhai Yingjian (CHN)	Monassar Mohamed Saleh (QAT)
1986 Seoul	Chen Zebin (CHN)	Takeshi Kojo (JPN)	Park Young-jun (KOR)
1990 Beijing	Munehiro Kaneko (JPN)	Guu Jin-shoei (TPE)	Gong Guohua (CHN)
1994 Hiroshima	Ramil Ganiyev (UZB)	Oleg Veretelnikov (UZB)	Tomokazu Sugama (JPN)
1998 Bangkok	Oleg Veretelnikov (UZB)	Ramil Ganiyev (UZB)	Toru Yasui (JPN)
2002 Busan	Qi Haifeng (CHN)	Dmitriy Karpov (KAZ)	Ahmad Hassan Moussa (QAT)
2006 Doha	Dmitriy Karpov (KAZ)	Vitaliy Smirnov (UZB)	Kim Kun-woo (KOR)
2010 Guangzhou	Dmitriy Karpov (KAZ)	Kim Kun-woo (KOR)	Vũ Văn Huyện (VIE)
2014 Incheon	Keisuke Ushiro (JPN)	Leonid Andreev (UZB)	Akihiko Nakamura (JPN)
2018 Jakarta–Palembang	Keisuke Ushiro (JPN)	Sutthisak Singkhon (THA)	Akihiko Nakamura (JPN)
2022 Hangzhou	Sun Qihao (CHN)	Tejaswin Shankar (IND)	Yuma Maruyama (JPN)
2026 Aichi–Nagoya	Yuma Maruyama (JPN)	Chen Xinghua (CHN)	Tejaswin Shankar (IND)

== Women ==
=== 100 m ===
Games	Gold	Silver	Bronze
1951 New Delhi	Kiyoko Sugimura (JPN)	Roshan Mistry (IND)	Kimiko Okamoto (JPN)
1954 Manila	Atsuko Nambu (JPN)	Mary Klass (SIN)	Christine Brown (IND)
1958 Tokyo	Inocencia Solis (PHI)	Sakura Fukuyama (JPN)	Yuko Kobayashi (JPN)
1962 Jakarta	Mona Sulaiman (PHI)	Ikuko Yoda (JPN)	Takako Inokuchi (JPN)
1966 Bangkok	Miho Sato (JPN)	Ritsuko Sukegawa (JPN)	Debra Marcus (ISR)
1970 Bangkok	Chi Cheng (ROC)	Keiko Yamada (JPN)	Carolina Rieuwpassa (INA)
1974 Tehran	Esther Roth (ISR)	He Zufen (CHN)	Keiko Yamada (JPN)
1978 Bangkok	Yin Yaping (CHN)	Yukiko Osako (JPN)	Usanee Laopinkarn (THA)
1982 New Delhi	Lydia de Vega (PHI)	P. T. Usha (IND)	Mo Myung-hee (KOR)
1986 Seoul	Lydia de Vega (PHI)	P. T. Usha (IND)	Ratjai Sripet (THA)
1990 Beijing	Tian Yumei (CHN)	Wang Huei-chen (TPE)	Lee Young-sook (KOR)
1994 Hiroshima	Liu Xiaomei (CHN)	Wang Huei-chen (TPE)	Huang Xiaoyan (CHN)
1998 Bangkok	Li Xuemei (CHN)	Li Yali (CHN)	Rachita Mistry (IND)
2002 Busan	Susanthika Jayasinghe (SRI)	Lyubov Perepelova (UZB)	Qin Wangping (CHN)
2006 Doha	Guzel Khubbieva (UZB)	Susanthika Jayasinghe (SRI)	Ruqaya Al-Ghasra (BRN)
2010 Guangzhou	Chisato Fukushima (JPN)	Guzel Khubbieva (UZB)	Vũ Thị Hương (VIE)
2014 Incheon	Wei Yongli (CHN)	Chisato Fukushima (JPN)	Olga Safronova (KAZ)
2018 Jakarta–Palembang	Edidiong Odiong (BRN)	Dutee Chand (IND)	Wei Yongli (CHN)
2022 Hangzhou	Ge Manqi (CHN)	Shanti Pereira (SGP)	Hajar Al-Khaldi (BRN)
2026 Aichi-Nagoya	Chen Yujie (CHN)	Shanti Pereira (SGP)	Edidiong Odiong (BRN)

=== 200 m ===
Games	Gold	Silver	Bronze
1951 New Delhi	Kimiko Okamoto (JPN)	Laura Dowdswell (SIN)	Mary D'Souza (IND)
1954 Manila	Midori Tanaka (JPN)	Atsuko Nambu (JPN)	Inocencia Solis (PHI)
1958 Tokyo	Yuko Kobayashi (JPN)	Stephie D'Souza (IND)	Hiroko Shiojiri (JPN)
1962 Jakarta	Mona Sulaiman (PHI)	Haruko Yamazaki (JPN)	Nirmala Dissanayake (CEY)
1966 Bangkok	Debra Marcus (ISR)	Miyoko Tsujishita (JPN)	Kishiko Ikeda (JPN)
1970 Bangkok	Keiko Yamada (JPN)	Amelita Alanes (PHI)	Carolina Rieuwpassa (INA)
1974 Tehran	Esther Roth (ISR)	He Zufen (CHN)	Emiko Konishi (JPN)
1978 Bangkok	Usanee Laopinkarn (THA)	Lee Eun-ja (KOR)	Junko Kushibuchi (JPN)
1982 New Delhi	Hiromi Isozaki (JPN)	P. T. Usha (IND)	Mo Myung-hee (KOR)
1986 Seoul	P. T. Usha (IND)	Lydia de Vega (PHI)	Park Mi-sun (KOR)
1990 Beijing	Han Qing (CHN)	Wang Huei-chen (TPE)	Tian Yumei (CHN)
1994 Hiroshima	Wang Huei-chen (TPE)	Susanthika Jayasinghe (SRI)	Damayanthi Dharsha (SRI)
1998 Bangkok	Damayanthi Dharsha (SRI)	Li Xuemei (CHN)	Yan Jiankui (CHN)
2002 Busan	Saraswati Saha (IND)	Ni Xiaoli (CHN)	Viktoriya Kovyreva (KAZ)
2006 Doha	Ruqaya Al-Ghasra (BRN)	Guzel Khubbieva (UZB)	Susanthika Jayasinghe (SRI)
2010 Guangzhou	Chisato Fukushima (JPN)	Vũ Thị Hương (VIE)	Guzel Khubbieva (UZB)
2014 Incheon	Olga Safronova (KAZ)	Wei Yongli (CHN)	Chisato Fukushima (JPN)
2018 Jakarta–Palembang	Edidiong Odiong (BRN)	Dutee Chand (IND)	Wei Yongli (CHN)
2022 Hangzhou	Shanti Pereira (SGP)	Li Yuting (CHN)	Edidiong Odiong (BRN)
2026 Aichi-Nagoya	Shanti Pereira (SGP)	Chen Yujie (CHN)	Harita Bhadra (IND)

=== 400 m ===
Games	Gold	Silver	Bronze
1966 Bangkok	Mary Rajamani (MAL)	Han Myung-hee (KOR)	Yasuyo Mishima (JPN)
1970 Bangkok	Kamaljeet Sandhu (IND)	Aviva Balas (ISR)	Nobuko Kawano (JPN)
1974 Tehran	Chee Swee Lee (SIN)	Nobuko Kawano (JPN)	Junaidah Aman (MAL)
1978 Bangkok	Saik Oik Cum (MAL)	Keiko Nagasawa (JPN)	Gao Yanqing (CHN)
1982 New Delhi	Hiromi Isozaki (JPN)	Junko Yoshida (JPN)	Padmini Thomas (IND)
1986 Seoul	P. T. Usha (IND)	Shiny Abraham (IND)	Hiromi Isozaki (JPN)
1990 Beijing	Li Guilian (CHN)	P. T. Usha (IND)	Li Wenhong (CHN)
1994 Hiroshima	Ma Yuqin (CHN)	Zhang Hengyun (CHN)	Kutty Saramma (IND)
1998 Bangkok	Damayanthi Dharsha (SRI)	Chen Yuxiang (CHN)	Svetlana Bodritskaya (KAZ)
2002 Busan	Damayanthi Dharsha (SRI)	K. M. Beenamol (IND)	Svetlana Bodritskaya (KAZ)
2006 Doha	Olga Tereshkova (KAZ)	Manjeet Kaur (IND)	Asami Tanno (JPN)
2010 Guangzhou	Olga Tereshkova (KAZ)	Asami Chiba (JPN)	Marina Maslyonko (KAZ)
2014 Incheon	Kemi Adekoya (BRN)	Quách Thị Lan (VIE)	M. R. Poovamma (IND)
2018 Jakarta–Palembang	Salwa Eid Naser (BRN)	Hima Das (IND)	Elina Mikhina (KAZ)
2022 Hangzhou	Kemi Adekoya (BRN)	Salwa Eid Naser (BRN)	Shereen Samson Vallabouy (MAS)
2026 Aichi–Nagoya	Salwa Eid Naser (BHR)	Zahra Zarei Manoujan (IRI)	Prachi (IND)

=== 800 m ===
Games	Gold	Silver	Bronze
1962 Jakarta	Chizuko Tanaka (JPN)	Ryuko Hirano (JPN)	Soewatini (INA)
1966 Bangkok	Hana Shezifi (ISR)	Yoko Miyamoto (JPN)	Yasuyo Mishima (JPN)
1970 Bangkok	Hana Shezifi (ISR)	Nobuko Kawano (JPN)	Isabel Cruz (PHI)
1974 Tehran	Nobuko Kawano (JPN)	Mikayo Inoue (JPN)	Li Dan (CHN)
1978 Bangkok	Geeta Zutshi (IND)	Jung Dong-sun (PRK)	Chang Yong-ae (PRK)
1982 New Delhi	Chang Yong-ae (PRK)	Geeta Zutshi (IND)	Guo Guimei (CHN)
1986 Seoul	Lim Chun-ae (KOR)	Yang Liuxia (CHN)	Josephine Mary Singarayar (MAL)
1990 Beijing	Li Wenhong (CHN)	Zheng Lijuan (CHN)	Rosa Kutty (IND)
1994 Hiroshima	Qu Yunxia (CHN)	Liu Li (CHN)	Shiny Wilson (IND)
1998 Bangkok	Jyotirmoyee Sikdar (IND)	Rosa Kutty (IND)	Wang Yuanping (CHN)
2002 Busan	K. M. Beenamol (IND)	Madhuri Saxena (IND)	Zamira Amirova (UZB)
2006 Doha	Maryam Yusuf Jamal (BRN)	Viktoriya Yalovtseva (KAZ)	Zamira Amirova (UZB)
2010 Guangzhou	Margarita Matsko (KAZ)	Trương Thanh Hằng (VIE)	Tintu Luka (IND)
2014 Incheon	Margarita Mukasheva (KAZ)	Tintu Luka (IND)	Zhao Jing (CHN)
2018 Jakarta–Palembang	Wang Chunyu (CHN)	Margarita Mukasheva (KAZ)	Manal El-Bahraoui (BRN)
2022 Hangzhou	Tharushi Karunarathna (SRI)	Harmilan Bains (IND)	Wang Chunyu (CHN)
2026 Aichi–Nagoya	Wu Hongjiao (CHN)	Nelly Jepkosgei (BRN)	Victoria Bossong (PHI)

=== 1500 m ===
Games	Gold	Silver	Bronze
1970 Bangkok	Hana Shezifi (ISR)	Mikayo Inoue (JPN)	Lee Chiu-hsia (ROC)
1974 Tehran	Song Meihua (CHN)	Yang Yanying (CHN)	Hana Shezifi (ISR)
1978 Bangkok	Kim Ok-sun (PRK)	Geeta Zutshi (IND)	Choi Yung-ran (PRK)
1982 New Delhi	Chang Yong-ae (PRK)	Geeta Zutshi (IND)	Kim Ok-sun (PRK)
1986 Seoul	Lim Chun-ae (KOR)	Yang Liuxia (CHN)	Kim Wei-ja (KOR)
1990 Beijing	Zheng Lijuan (CHN)	Jiang Shuling (CHN)	Khin Khin Htwe (MYA)
1994 Hiroshima	Qu Yunxia (CHN)	Yan Wei (CHN)	Khin Khin Htwe (MYA)
1998 Bangkok	Jyotirmoyee Sikdar (IND)	Wang Qingfen (CHN)	Sunita Rani (IND)
2002 Busan	Sunita Rani (IND)	Tatyana Borisova (KGZ)	Yoshiko Ichikawa (JPN)
2006 Doha	Maryam Yusuf Jamal (BRN)	Yuriko Kobayashi (JPN)	Sinimole Paulose (IND)
2010 Guangzhou	Maryam Yusuf Jamal (BRN)	Trương Thanh Hằng (VIE)	Mimi Belete (BRN)
2014 Incheon	Maryam Yusuf Jamal (BRN)	Mimi Belete (BRN)	O. P. Jaisha (IND)
2018 Jakarta–Palembang	Kalkidan Gezahegne (BRN)	Tigist Gashaw (BRN)	P. U. Chitra (IND)
2022 Hangzhou	Winfred Yavi (BRN)	Harmilan Bains (IND)	Marta Yota (BRN)
2026 Aichi-Nagoya	Nelly Korir (BRN)	Li Chunhui (CHN)	Nozomi Tanaka (JPN)

=== 3000 m ===
Games	Gold	Silver	Bronze
1978 Bangkok	Kim Ok-sun (PRK)	Lu Hongxiang (CHN)	Yang Yanying (CHN)
1982 New Delhi	Kim Ok-sun (PRK)	Kim Chun-hwa (PRK)	Shino Izutsu (JPN)
1986 Seoul	Lim Chun-ae (KOR)	Zhang Xiuyun (CHN)	Suman Rawat (IND)
1990 Beijing	Zhong Huandi (CHN)	Kim Chun-mae (PRK)	Wang Huabi (CHN)
1994 Hiroshima	Zhang Linli (CHN)	Harumi Hiroyama (JPN)	Lu Ou (CHN)

=== 5000 m ===
Games	Gold	Silver	Bronze
1998 Bangkok	Supriyati Sutono (INA)	Sunita Rani (IND)	Michiko Shimizu (JPN)
2002 Busan	Sun Yingjie (CHN)	Kayoko Fukushi (JPN)	Sunita Rani (IND)
2006 Doha	Xue Fei (CHN)	Kayo Sugihara (JPN)	O. P. Jaisha (IND)
2010 Guangzhou	Mimi Belete (BRN)	Preeja Sreedharan (IND)	Kavita Raut (IND)
2014 Incheon	Maryam Yusuf Jamal (BRN)	Mimi Belete (BRN)	Ding Changqin (CHN)
2018 Jakarta–Palembang	Kalkidan Gezahegne (BRN)	Darya Maslova (KGZ)	Bontu Rebitu (BRN)
2022 Hangzhou	Parul Chaudhary (IND)	Ririka Hironaka (JPN)	Caroline Chepkoech Kipkirui (KAZ)
2026 Aichi–Nagoya	Winfred Yavi (BRN)	Nozomi Tanaka (JPN)	Parul Chaudhary (IND)

=== 10,000 m ===
Games	Gold	Silver	Bronze
1986 Seoul	Wang Xiuting (CHN)	Kumi Araki (JPN)	Xiao Hongyan (CHN)
1990 Beijing	Zhong Huandi (CHN)	Wang Xiuting (CHN)	Akemi Matsuno (JPN)
1994 Hiroshima	Wang Junxia (CHN)	Dong Li (CHN)	Miki Igarashi (JPN)
1998 Bangkok	Yuko Kawakami (JPN)	Zheng Guixia (CHN)	Chiemi Takahashi (JPN)
2002 Busan	Sun Yingjie (CHN)	Kayoko Fukushi (JPN)	Xing Huina (CHN)
2006 Doha	Kayoko Fukushi (JPN)	Kareema Saleh Jasim (BRN)	Hiromi Ominami (JPN)
2010 Guangzhou	Preeja Sreedharan (IND)	Kavita Raut (IND)	Shitaye Eshete (BRN)
2014 Incheon	Alia Saeed Mohammed (UAE)	Ding Changqin (CHN)	Ayumi Hagiwara (JPN)
2018 Jakarta–Palembang	Darya Maslova (KGZ)	Eunice Chumba (BRN)	Zhang Deshun (CHN)
2022 Hangzhou	Violah Jepchumba (BRN)	Ririka Hironaka (JPN)	Caroline Chepkoech Kipkirui (KAZ)
2026 Aichi-Nagoya	Winfred Yavi (BRN)	Nozomi Tanaka (JPN)	Seema Kumari (IND)

=== 100 m hurdles ===
- 80 m hurdles: 1951–1966

Games	Gold	Silver	Bronze
1951 New Delhi	Kyoko Yoneda (JPN)	Laura Dowdswell (SIN)	Taeko Sato (JPN)
1954 Manila	Michiko Iwamoto (JPN)	Miyo Miyashita (JPN)	Tang Pui Wah (SIN)
1958 Tokyo	Michiko Iwamoto (JPN)	Francisca Sanopal (PHI)	Manolita Cinco (PHI)
1962 Jakarta	Ikuko Yoda (JPN)	Francisca Sanopal (PHI)	Kiyoko Shimada (JPN)
1966 Bangkok	Ritsuko Sukegawa (JPN)	Takako Abe (JPN)	Manjit Walia (IND)
1970 Bangkok	Esther Shahamorov (ISR)	Ayako Natsume (JPN)	Lin Yueh-hsiang (ROC)
1974 Tehran	Esther Roth (ISR)	Tomomi Hayashida (JPN)	Miyuki Iioka (JPN)
1978 Bangkok	Dai Jianhua (CHN)	Tamie Motegi (JPN)	Xie Lizhen (CHN)
1982 New Delhi	Emi Akimoto (JPN)	Chizuko Akimoto (JPN)	Dai Jianhua (CHN)
1986 Seoul	Chen Kemei (CHN)	Chizuko Akimoto (JPN)	Naomi Jojima (JPN)
1990 Beijing	Liu Huajin (CHN)	Luo Bin (CHN)	Chizuko Akimoto (JPN)
1994 Hiroshima	Olga Shishigina (KAZ)	Zhou Hongyang (CHN)	Zhang Yu (CHN)
1998 Bangkok	Olga Shishigina (KAZ)	Liu Jing (CHN)	Sriyani Kulawansa (SRI)
2002 Busan	Feng Yun (CHN)	Su Yiping (CHN)	Trecia Roberts (THA)
2006 Doha	Liu Jing (CHN)	Feng Yun (CHN)	Lee Yeon-kyung (KOR)
2010 Guangzhou	Lee Yeon-kyung (KOR)	Natalya Ivoninskaya (KAZ)	Sun Yawei (CHN)
2014 Incheon	Wu Shuijiao (CHN)	Sun Yawei (CHN)	Ayako Kimura (JPN)
2018 Jakarta–Palembang	Jung Hye-lim (KOR)	Emilia Nova (INA)	Lui Lai Yiu (HKG)
2022 Hangzhou	Lin Yuwei (CHN)	Jyothi Yarraji (IND)	Yumi Tanaka (JPN)
2026 Aichi–Nagoya	Mako Fukube (JPN)	Hitomi Nakajima (JPN)	Wu Yanni (CHN)

=== 400 m hurdles ===
Games	Gold	Silver	Bronze
1978 Bangkok	Chen Xin (CHN)	Li Sulan (CHN)	Masae Kiguchi (JPN)
1982 New Delhi	M. D. Valsamma (IND)	Yumiko Aoi (JPN)	Liu Guihua (CHN)
1986 Seoul	P. T. Usha (IND)	Zhao Qianqian (CHN)	Chen Juying (CHN)
1990 Beijing	Chen Juying (CHN)	Chen Dongmei (CHN)	Elma Muros (PHI)
1994 Hiroshima	Leng Xueyan (CHN)	Hsu Pei-ching (TPE)	Natalya Torshina (KAZ)
1998 Bangkok	Natalya Torshina (KAZ)	Hsu Pei-ching (TPE)	Li Yulian (CHN)
2002 Busan	Natalya Torshina (KAZ)	Song Yinglan (CHN)	Yao Yuehua (CHN)
2006 Doha	Huang Xiaoxiao (CHN)	Satomi Kubokura (JPN)	Noraseela Mohd Khalid (MAS)
2010 Guangzhou	Ashwini Akkunji (IND)	Wang Xing (CHN)	Satomi Kubokura (JPN)
2014 Incheon	Kemi Adekoya (BRN)	Satomi Kubokura (JPN)	Xiao Xia (CHN)
2018 Jakarta–Palembang	Quách Thị Lan (VIE)	Aminat Yusuf Jamal (BRN)	Anu Raghavan (IND)
2022 Hangzhou	Kemi Adekoya (BRN)	Mo Jiadie (CHN)	Vithya Ramraj (IND)
2026 Aichi–Nagoya	Mariam Kareem (UAE)	Adelina Zems (KAZ)	Vithya Ramraj (IND)

=== 3000 m steeplechase ===
Games	Gold	Silver	Bronze
2010 Guangzhou	Sudha Singh (IND)	Jin Yuan (CHN)	Minori Hayakari (JPN)
2014 Incheon	Ruth Jebet (BRN)	Li Zhenzhu (CHN)	Lalita Babar (IND)
2018 Jakarta–Palembang	Winfred Yavi (BRN)	Sudha Singh (IND)	Nguyễn Thị Oanh (VIE)
2022 Hangzhou	Winfred Yavi (BRN)	Parul Chaudhary (IND)	Priti Lamba (IND)
2026 Aichi–Nagoya	Winfred Yavi (BRN)	Norah Jeruto Tanui (KAZ)	Parul Chaudhary (IND)

=== 4 × 100 m relay ===
Games	Gold	Silver	Bronze
1951 New Delhi	Japan (JPN); Kimiko Okamoto; Taeko Sato; Ayako Yoshikawa; Kiyoko Sugimura	India (IND); Banoo Gulzar; Mary D'Souza; Pat Mendonca; Roshan Mistry	Indonesia (INA); Surjowati; Triwulan; Darwati; Lie Djiang Nio
1954 Manila	India (IND); Christine Brown; Stephie D'Souza; Violet Peters; Mary D'Souza	Japan (JPN); Michiko Iwamoto; Kimiko Okamoto; Midori Tanaka; Atsuko Nambu	Philippines (PHI); Rogelia Ferrer; Manolita Cinco; Roberta Anore; Inocencia Solis
1958 Tokyo	Japan (JPN); Sakura Fukuyama; Yoshie Fujii; Ikuko Yoda; Yuko Kobayashi	Philippines (PHI); Inocencia Solis; Rogelia Ferrer; Irene Penuela; Francisca Sanopal	India (IND); Christine Brown; Stephie D'Souza; Violet Peters; Mary Leela Rao
1962 Jakarta	Philippines (PHI); Aida Molinos; Francisca Sanopal; Inocencia Solis; Mona Sulaiman	Japan (JPN); Haruko Yamazaki; Takako Inokuchi; Kiyoko Shimada; Ikuko Yoda	Indonesia (INA); Soeratmi; Ernawati; Willy Tomasoa; Wiewiek Machwijar
1966 Bangkok	Japan (JPN); Ritsuko Sukegawa; Kishiko Ikeda; Miho Sato; Miyoko Tsujishita	Republic of China (ROC); Chi Cheng; Tien Ah-mei; Yeh Chu-mei; Huang Pi-yun	Malaysia (MAL); Jacqueline Kleinman; Mary Rajamani; Rajemah Sheikh Ahmad; Cheryl Dorall
1970 Bangkok	Japan (JPN); Keiko Yamada; Emiko Konishi; Ritsuko Sato; Keiko Tsuchida	Singapore (SIN); Glory Barnabas; Schushila Wadhumal; Maimoon Abu Bakar; Gan Bee Wah	Republic of China (ROC); Liang Su-chiao; Hung Mei-yu; Lin Chun-yu; Huang Pi-yun
1974 Tehran	Japan (JPN); Sayo Yamato; Tomomi Hayashida; Emiko Konishi; Keiko Yamada	China (CHN); Meng Yuqiong; Kang Yueli; Xiao Zinong; He Zufen	Singapore (SIN); Eng Chiew Quay; Chee Swee Lee; Glory Barnabas; Maimoon Azlan
1978 Bangkok	Thailand (THA); Buspranee Ratanapol; Walapa Pinij; Pusadee Sangvijit; Usanee Laopinkarn	Japan (JPN); Emiko Konishi; Junko Kushibuchi; Yukiko Osako; Tomoko Maeda	Philippines (PHI); Amelita Saberon; Lorena Morcilla; Lucila Tolentino; Lydia Silva-Netto
1982 New Delhi	Japan (JPN); Emiko Konishi; Hiromi Isozaki; Emi Akimoto; Junko Yoshida	Thailand (THA); Walapa Tangjitnusorn; Jaree Patarach; Sumalee Poosup; Pusadee Sangvijit	South Korea (KOR); Mo Myung-hee; Chun Jung-shik; Park Mi-sun; Chun Kyung-mi
1986 Seoul	China (CHN); Pan Weixin; Shao Liwei; Luo Xin; Tian Yumei	Thailand (THA); Jaree Patarach; Reawadee Srithoa; Ratjai Sripet; Walapa Tangjitnusorn	South Korea (KOR); Yoon Mi-kyong; An Sin-young; Park Mi-sun; Lee Young-sook
1990 Beijing	China (CHN); Huang Xiaoyan; Tian Yumei; Wang Ping; Zhang Caihua	India (IND); Zenia Ayrton; Ashwini Nachappa; Kutty Saramma; P. T. Usha	Thailand (THA); Nednapa Chommuak; Reawadee Srithoa; Ratjai Sripet; Pronpim Srisurat
1994 Hiroshima	China (CHN); Chen Yan; Liu Xiaomei; Ou Yanlan; Huang Xiaoyan	Thailand (THA); Naparat Suajongprue; Dokjun Dokduang; Nednapa Chommuak; Kwuanfah Inchareon	Japan (JPN); Kanae Ito; Toshie Kitada; Kazue Kakinuma; Tomomi Kaneko
1998 Bangkok	China (CHN); Liang Yi; Yan Jiankui; Li Xuemei; Li Yali	Uzbekistan (UZB); Guzel Khubbieva; Lyubov Perepelova; Lyudmila Dmitriadi; Elena Kviatkovskaya	Thailand (THA); Supavadee Khawpeag; Natthaporn Wongtiprat; Savitree Srichure; Reawadee Watanasin
2002 Busan	China (CHN); Zeng Xiujun; Yan Jiankui; Huang Mei; Qin Wangping	Thailand (THA); Jutamass Tawoncharoen; Supavadee Khawpeag; Orranut Klomdee; Trecia Roberts	Uzbekistan (UZB); Anna Kazakova; Guzel Khubbieva; Lyudmila Dmitriadi; Lyubov Perepelova
2006 Doha	China (CHN); Wang Jing; Chen Jue; Han Ling; Qin Wangping	Japan (JPN); Tomoko Ishida; Momoko Takahashi; Takarako Nakamura; Sakie Nobuoka	Chinese Taipei (TPE); Lin Yi-chun; Chuang Shu-chuan; Chen Ying-ru; Yu Sheue-an
2010 Guangzhou	Thailand (THA); Phatsorn Jaksuninkorn; Neeranuch Klomdee; Laphassaporn Tawoncharoen; Nongnuch Sanrat	China (CHN); Tao Yujia; Liang Qiuping; Jiang Lan; Ye Jiabei	Japan (JPN); Mayumi Watanabe; Momoko Takahashi; Yumeka Sano; Chisato Fukushima
2014 Incheon	China (CHN); Tao Yujia; Kong Lingwei; Lin Huijun; Wei Yongli	Kazakhstan (KAZ); Svetlana Ivanchukova; Viktoriya Zyabkina; Anastassiya Tulapina; Olga Safronova	Japan (JPN); Anna Fujimori; Kana Ichikawa; Masumi Aoki; Chisato Fukushima
2018 Jakarta–Palembang	Bahrain (BRN); Iman Essa Jasim; Edidiong Odiong; Hajar Al-Khaldi; Salwa Eid Naser	China (CHN); Liang Xiaojing; Wei Yongli; Ge Manqi; Yuan Qiqi; Huang Guifen; Kong Lingwei	Kazakhstan (KAZ); Viktoriya Zyabkina; Elina Mikhina; Svetlana Golendova; Olga Safronova; Rima Kashafutdinova
2022 Hangzhou	China (CHN); Liang Xiaojing; Wei Yongli; Yuan Qiqi; Ge Manqi	Thailand (THA); Supawan Thipat; Supanich Poolkerd; Onuma Chattha; Sukanda Petraksa	Malaysia (MAS); Azreen Nabila Alias; Zaidatul Husniah Zulkifli; Nur Afrina Batrisyia; Shereen Samson Vallabouy
2026 Aichi–Nagoya	China (CHN); Liang Xiaojing; Liu Guoyi; Liu Xiajun; Chen Yujie	Thailand (THA); Manatsada Sanmano; Sukanda Petraksa; Supanich Poolkerd; Jirapat Khanonta	Japan (JPN); Masumi Aoki; Manaka Miura; Aiko Iki; Midori Mikase

=== 4 × 400 m relay ===
Games	Gold	Silver	Bronze
1974 Tehran	Japan (JPN); Yuko Kitabayashi; Mutsuko Otsuka; Mikayo Inoue; Nobuko Kawano	Singapore (SIN); Glory Barnabas; Lee Tai Jong; Maimoon Azlan; Chee Swee Lee	Burma (BIR); Than Than; Mar Mar Min; Nwe Nwe Yee; Than Than Htay
1978 Bangkok	Japan (JPN); Keiko Nagasawa; Mayumi Kubota; Tomoko Maeda; Masae Kiguchi	China (CHN); Gao Yanqing; Liang Lihua; Guo Guimei; Zhang Huifen	North Korea (PRK); Jang Geun-ok; Chang Yong-ae; Jung Dong-sun; Kim Ok-sun
1982 New Delhi	Japan (JPN); Hitomi Koshimoto; Junko Yoshida; Izumi Takahata; Hiromi Isozaki	India (IND); Rita Sen; Hamida Banu; M. D. Valsamma; Padmini Thomas	China (CHN); Liang Yueling; Liu Guihua; Guo Guimei; Gao Yanqing
1986 Seoul	India (IND); M. D. Valsamma; Vandana Rao; Shiny Abraham; P. T. Usha	Japan (JPN); Keiko Honda; Hitomi Koshimoto; Ayako Arai; Hiromi Isozaki	China (CHN); Zhao Qianqian; Lin Zhenglan; Chen Juying; Huang Jing
1990 Beijing	China (CHN); Li Guilian; Chen Juying; Zhou Qing; Li Wenhong	India (IND); Pranati Mishra; Shantimol Philips; Kutty Saramma; P. T. Usha	Malaysia (MAL); Rabia Abdul Salam; Sajaratuldur Hamzah; Shanti Govindasamy; Josephine Mary Singarayar
1994 Hiroshima	China (CHN); Leng Xueyan; Zhang Hengyun; Cao Chunying; Ma Yuqin	India (IND); P. T. Usha; G. V. Dhanalakshmi; Shiny Wilson; Kutty Saramma	Thailand (THA); Saleerat Srimek; Reawadee Watanasin; Sukanya Sang-nguen; Noodang Phimpho
1998 Bangkok	China (CHN); Zhang Hengyun; Zhang Henghua; Li Yulian; Chen Yuxiang	India (IND); K. M. Beenamol; Jyotirmoyee Sikdar; Rosa Kutty; Jincy Phillip	Kazakhstan (KAZ); Natalya Torshina; Svetlana Badrankova; Svetlana Bodritskaya; Svetlana Kazanina
2002 Busan	India (IND); Jincy Phillip; Manjeet Kaur; Soma Biswas; K. M. Beenamol	Kazakhstan (KAZ); Tatyana Roslanova; Natalya Torshina; Olga Tereshkova; Svetlana Bodritskaya	China (CHN); Qin Wangping; Bo Fanfang; Hou Xiufen; Chen Yuxiang
2006 Doha	India (IND); Sathi Geetha; Pinki Pramanik; Chitra Soman; Manjeet Kaur	Kazakhstan (KAZ); Marina Maslyonko; Viktoriya Yalovtseva; Tatyana Azarova; Olga Tereshkova	China (CHN); Han Ling; Huang Xiaoxiao; Tang Xiaoyin; Li Xueji
2010 Guangzhou	India (IND); Manjeet Kaur; Sini Jose; Ashwini Akkunji; Mandeep Kaur	Kazakhstan (KAZ); Marina Maslyonko; Viktoriya Yalovtseva; Margarita Matsko; Olga Tereshkova	China (CHN); Zheng Zhihui; Tang Xiaoyin; Chen Lin; Chen Jingwen
2014 Incheon	India (IND); Priyanka Pawar; Tintu Luka; Mandeep Kaur; M. R. Poovamma	Japan (JPN); Seika Aoyama; Nanako Matsumoto; Kana Ichikawa; Asami Chiba	China (CHN); Li Manyuan; Wang Huan; Chen Jingwen; Cheng Chong
2018 Jakarta–Palembang	India (IND); Hima Das; M. R. Poovamma; Sarita Gayakwad; V. K. Vismaya	Bahrain (BRN); Aminat Yusuf Jamal; Iman Essa Jasim; Edidiong Odiong; Salwa Eid Naser	Vietnam (VIE); Nguyễn Thị Oanh; Nguyễn Thị Hằng; Hoàng Thị Ngọc; Quách Thị Lan
2022 Hangzhou	Bahrain (BRN); Muna Saad Mubarak; Kemi Adekoya; Zenab Moussa Mahamat; Salwa Eid Naser	India (IND); Vithya Ramraj; Aishwarya Mishra; Prachi Choudhary; Subha Venkatesan	Sri Lanka (SRI); Nadeesha Ramanayake; Jayeshi Uththara; Lakshima Mendis; Tharushi Karunarathna
2026 Aichi–Nagoya	India (IND); Kiran Pahal; Poovamma Machettira; Prachi Choudhary; Vithya Ramraj	Bahrain (BRN); Aisha Abdullah; Sufian Abdulghani; Zainab Fyofuoba; Salwa Eid Naser	China (CHN); Jiang Yutong; Kong Yingying; Zhou Li; Zuo Siyu

=== Marathon ===
Games	Gold	Silver	Bronze
1986 Seoul	Eriko Asai (JPN)	Misako Miyahara (JPN)	Wen Yanmin (CHN)
1990 Beijing	Zhao Youfeng (CHN)	Kumi Araki (JPN)	Lee Mi-ok (KOR)
1994 Hiroshima	Zhong Huandi (CHN)	Zhang Lirong (CHN)	Nobuko Fujimura (JPN)
1998 Bangkok	Naoko Takahashi (JPN)	Kim Chang-ok (PRK)	Tomoko Kai (JPN)
2002 Busan	Ham Bong-sil (PRK)	Harumi Hiroyama (JPN)	Hiromi Ominami (JPN)
2006 Doha	Zhou Chunxiu (CHN)	Kiyoko Shimahara (JPN)	Kayoko Obata (JPN)
2010 Guangzhou	Zhou Chunxiu (CHN)	Zhu Xiaolin (CHN)	Kim Kum-ok (PRK)
2014 Incheon	Eunice Kirwa (BRN)	Ryoko Kizaki (JPN)	Lishan Dula (BRN)
2018 Jakarta–Palembang	Rose Chelimo (BRN)	Keiko Nogami (JPN)	Choi Kyung-sun (KOR)
2022 Hangzhou	Eunice Chumba (BRN)	Zhang Deshun (CHN)	Sardana Trofimova (KGZ)
2026 Aichi-Nagoya	Shitaye Habte (BRN)	Ciren Cuomu (CHN)	Mikuni Yada (JPN)

=== Half marathon race walk ===
Games	Gold	Silver	Bronze
2026 Aichi-Nagoya	Yang Liujing (CHN)	Kristina Morozova (KAZ)	Jiang Yunyan (CHN)

=== Marathon race walk ===
Games	Gold	Silver	Bronze
2026 Aichi-Nagoya	Danzeng Quzong (CHN)	Ma Li (CHN)	Yukiko Umeno (JPN)

=== 10,000 m walk ===
- 10 km walk: 1986–1994

Games	Gold	Silver	Bronze
1986 Seoul	Guan Ping (CHN)	Xu Yongjiu (CHN)	Hideko Hirayama (JPN)
1990 Beijing	Chen Yueling (CHN)	Jin Bingjie (CHN)	Fusako Masuda (JPN)
1994 Hiroshima	Gao Hongmiao (CHN)	Gu Yan (CHN)	Yuko Sato (JPN)
1998 Bangkok	Liu Hongyu (CHN)	Rie Mitsumori (JPN)	Svetlana Tolstaya (KAZ)

=== 20 km walk ===
Games	Gold	Silver	Bronze
2002 Busan	Wang Qingqing (CHN)	Gao Kelian (CHN)	Svetlana Tolstaya (KAZ)
2006 Doha	Liu Hong (CHN)	Ryoko Sakakura (JPN)	He Dan (CHN)
2010 Guangzhou	Liu Hong (CHN)	Masumi Fuchise (JPN)	Li Yanfei (CHN)
2014 Incheon	Lü Xiuzhi (CHN)	Khushbir Kaur (IND)	Jeon Yeong-eun (KOR)
2018 Jakarta–Palembang	Yang Jiayu (CHN)	Qieyang Shijie (CHN)	Kumiko Okada (JPN)
2022 Hangzhou	Yang Jiayu (CHN)	Ma Zhenxia (CHN)	Nanako Fujii (JPN)

=== High jump ===
Games	Gold	Silver	Bronze
1951 New Delhi	Kyoko Yoneda (JPN)	Taeko Sato (JPN)	Marie Semoes (IND)
1954 Manila	Ahuva Kraus (ISR)	Miyoko Takahashi (JPN)	Mieko Muro (JPN)
1958 Tokyo	Emiko Kamiya (JPN)	Lolita Lagrosas (PHI)	Yumiko Kondo (JPN)
1962 Jakarta	Kinuko Tsutsumi (JPN)	Myint Myint Aye (BIR)	Shared silver
1962 Jakarta	Kinuko Tsutsumi (JPN)	Tiparpan Leenasean (THA)	Shared silver
1966 Bangkok	Mami Takeda (JPN)	Lolita Lagrosas (PHI)	Cheong Wai Hing (SIN)
1970 Bangkok	Michiyo Inaoka (JPN)	Kumie Suzuki (JPN)	Lolita Lagrosas (PHI)
1974 Tehran	Orit Abramovitz (ISR)	Mikiko Sone (JPN)	Wu Fushan (CHN)
1978 Bangkok	Zheng Dazhen (CHN)	Tamami Yagi (JPN)	Yang Wenqin (CHN)
1982 New Delhi	Zheng Dazhen (CHN)	Hisayo Fukumitsu (JPN)	Yang Wenqin (CHN)
1986 Seoul	Megumi Sato (JPN)	Zheng Dazhen (CHN)	Kim Hee-sun (KOR)
1990 Beijing	Megumi Sato (JPN)	Cao Zhongping (CHN)	Shared silver
1990 Beijing	Megumi Sato (JPN)	Kim Hee-sun (KOR)	Shared silver
1994 Hiroshima	Svetlana Munkova (UZB)	Svetlana Zalevskaya (KAZ)	Rassamee Taemsri (THA)
1998 Bangkok	Yoko Ota (JPN)	Jin Ling (CHN)	Anna Cherntsova (KGZ)
2002 Busan	Tatyana Efimenko (KGZ)	Bobby Aloysius (IND)	Shared silver
2002 Busan	Tatyana Efimenko (KGZ)	Marina Korzhova (KAZ)	Shared silver
2006 Doha	Marina Aitova (KAZ)	Zheng Xingjuan (CHN)	Shared silver
2006 Doha	Marina Aitova (KAZ)	Tatyana Efimenko (KGZ)	Shared silver
2010 Guangzhou	Svetlana Radzivil (UZB)	Nadiya Dusanova (UZB)	Zheng Xingjuan (CHN)
2010 Guangzhou	Svetlana Radzivil (UZB)	Nadiya Dusanova (UZB)	Anna Ustinova (KAZ)
2014 Incheon	Svetlana Radzivil (UZB)	Zheng Xingjuan (CHN)	Nadiya Dusanova (UZB)
2018 Jakarta–Palembang	Svetlana Radzivil (UZB)	Nadiya Dusanova (UZB)	Nadezhda Dubovitskaya (KAZ)
2022 Hangzhou	Safina Sadullayeva (UZB)	Svetlana Radzivil (UZB)	Nadezhda Dubovitskaya (KAZ)
2026 Aichi–Nagoya	Barnokhon Sayfullaeva (UZB)	Kristina Ovchinnikova (KAZ)	Pooja Singh (IND)

=== Pole vault ===
Games	Gold	Silver	Bronze
1998 Bangkok	Cai Weiyan (CHN)	Masumi Ono (JPN)	Sun Caiyun (CHN)
2002 Busan	Gao Shuying (CHN)	Masumi Ono (JPN)	Qin Xia (CHN)
2006 Doha	Gao Shuying (CHN)	Roslinda Samsu (MAS)	Zhao Yingying (CHN)
2006 Doha	Gao Shuying (CHN)	Roslinda Samsu (MAS)	Ikuko Nishikori (JPN)
2010 Guangzhou	Li Caixia (CHN)	Li Ling (CHN)	Tomomi Abiko (JPN)
2014 Incheon	Li Ling (CHN)	Tomomi Abiko (JPN)	Lim Eun-ji (KOR)
2018 Jakarta–Palembang	Li Ling (CHN)	Chayanisa Chomchuendee (THA)	Lim Eun-ji (KOR)
2022 Hangzhou	Li Ling (CHN)	Misaki Morota (JPN)	Niu Chunge (CHN)
2026 Aichi-Nagoya	Misaki Morota (JPN)	Niu Chunge (CHN)	Baranica Elangovan (IND)

=== Long jump ===
Games	Gold	Silver	Bronze
1951 New Delhi	Kiyoko Sugimura (JPN)	Ayako Yoshikawa (JPN)	Sylvia Gauntlet (IND)
1954 Manila	Yoshie Takahashi (JPN)	Atsuko Nambu (JPN)	Mikiko Tozaki (JPN)
1958 Tokyo	Visitacion Badana (PHI)	Mikiko Tozaki (JPN)	Huang Hsing (ROC)
1962 Jakarta	Sachiko Kishimoto (JPN)	Fumiko Ito (JPN)	Maureen Ann Lee (MAL)
1966 Bangkok	Chi Cheng (ROC)	Emiko Komaru (JPN)	Christine Forage (IND)
1970 Bangkok	Hiroko Yamashita (JPN)	Esther Shahamorov (ISR)	Keiko Tsuchida (JPN)
1974 Tehran	Xiao Jieping (CHN)	Kang Yueli (CHN)	Hiroko Yamashita (JPN)
1978 Bangkok	Zou Wa (CHN)	Angel Mary Joseph (IND)	Sumie Awara (JPN)
1982 New Delhi	Liao Wenfen (CHN)	Mercy Kuttan (IND)	Li Huirong (CHN)
1986 Seoul	Liao Wenfen (CHN)	Huang Donghuo (CHN)	Minako Isogai (JPN)
1990 Beijing	Xiong Qiying (CHN)	Liu Shuzhen (CHN)	Ri Yong-ae (PRK)
1994 Hiroshima	Yao Weili (CHN)	Li Jing (CHN)	Elma Muros (PHI)
1998 Bangkok	Guan Yingnan (CHN)	Yu Yiqun (CHN)	Yelena Pershina (KAZ)
2002 Busan	Anju Bobby George (IND)	Maho Hanaoka (JPN)	Yelena Koshcheyeva (KAZ)
2006 Doha	Kumiko Ikeda (JPN)	Anju Bobby George (IND)	Olga Rypakova (KAZ)
2010 Guangzhou	Jung Soon-ok (KOR)	Olga Rypakova (KAZ)	Yuliya Tarasova (UZB)
2014 Incheon	Maria Natalia Londa (INA)	Bùi Thị Thu Thảo (VIE)	Jiang Yanfei (CHN)
2018 Jakarta–Palembang	Bùi Thị Thu Thảo (VIE)	Neena Varakil (IND)	Xu Xiaoling (CHN)
2022 Hangzhou	Xiong Shiqi (CHN)	Ancy Sojan (IND)	Yue Nga Yan (HKG)
2026 Aichi–Nagoya	Huang Yingying (CHN)	Ancy Sojan (IND)	Tan Mengyi (CHN)

=== Triple jump ===
Games	Gold	Silver	Bronze
1998 Bangkok	Ren Ruiping (CHN)	Wu Lingmei (CHN)	Wiktoriýa Brigadnaýa (TKM)
2002 Busan	Huang Qiuyan (CHN)	Zhang Hao (CHN)	Tatyana Bocharova (KAZ)
2006 Doha	Xie Limei (CHN)	Anastasiya Juravleva (UZB)	Li Qian (CHN)
2010 Guangzhou	Olga Rypakova (KAZ)	Xie Limei (CHN)	Thitima Muangjan (THA)
2014 Incheon	Olga Rypakova (KAZ)	Aleksandra Kotlyarova (UZB)	Irina Ektova (KAZ)
2018 Jakarta–Palembang	Olga Rypakova (KAZ)	Parinya Chuaimaroeng (THA)	Vũ Thị Mến (VIE)
2022 Hangzhou	Sharifa Davronova (UZB)	Zeng Rui (CHN)	Mariko Morimoto (JPN)
2026 Aichi-Nagoya	Sharifa Davronova (UZB)	Huang Yingying (CHN)	Li Yi (CHN)

=== Shot put ===
Games	Gold	Silver	Bronze
1951 New Delhi	Toyoko Yoshino (JPN)	Fumi Kojima (JPN)	Barbara Webster (IND)
1954 Manila	Toyoko Yoshino (JPN)	Motoko Yoshida (JPN)	Yuriko Mizoguchi (JPN)
1958 Tokyo	Seiko Obonai (JPN)	Motoko Yoshida (JPN)	Wu Jin-yun (ROC)
1962 Jakarta	Seiko Obonai (JPN)	Yasuko Matsuda (JPN)	Mona Sulaiman (PHI)
1966 Bangkok	Ryoko Sugiyama (JPN)	Yuko Sawada (JPN)	Wu Jin-yun (ROC)
1970 Bangkok	Paik Ok-ja (KOR)	Satoe Matsuzaki (JPN)	Yoko Saito (JPN)
1974 Tehran	Paik Ok-ja (KOR)	Gao Yukui (CHN)	Kayoko Hayashi (JPN)
1978 Bangkok	Shen Lijuan (CHN)	Lü Cheng (CHN)	Kayoko Hayashi (JPN)
1982 New Delhi	Li Meisu (CHN)	Shen Lijuan (CHN)	Tetsuko Watase (JPN)
1986 Seoul	Huang Zhihong (CHN)	Cong Yuzhen (CHN)	Aya Suzuki (JPN)
1990 Beijing	Sui Xinmei (CHN)	Huang Zhihong (CHN)	Chong Chun-hwa (PRK)
1994 Hiroshima	Sui Xinmei (CHN)	Zhang Liuhong (CHN)	Sunisa Yooyao (THA)
1998 Bangkok	Li Meisu (CHN)	Cheng Xiaoyan (CHN)	Juttaporn Krasaeyan (THA)
2002 Busan	Li Meiju (CHN)	Lee Myung-sun (KOR)	Juttaporn Krasaeyan (THA)
2006 Doha	Li Ling (CHN)	Li Meiju (CHN)	Lin Chia-ying (TPE)
2010 Guangzhou	Li Ling (CHN)	Gong Lijiao (CHN)	Lee Mi-young (KOR)
2014 Incheon	Gong Lijiao (CHN)	Leila Rajabi (IRI)	Guo Tianqian (CHN)
2018 Jakarta–Palembang	Gong Lijiao (CHN)	Gao Yang (CHN)	Noora Salem Jasim (BRN)
2022 Hangzhou	Gong Lijiao (CHN)	Song Jiayuan (CHN)	Kiran Baliyan (IND)
2026 Aichi-Nagoya	Song Jiayuan (CHN)	Zhang Linru (CHN)	Manpreet Kaur (IND)

=== Discus throw ===
Games	Gold	Silver	Bronze
1951 New Delhi	Toyoko Yoshino (JPN)	Fumi Kojima (JPN)	Annie Salamun (INA)
1954 Manila	Toyoko Yoshino (JPN)	Taeko Nomura (JPN)	Yuriko Mizoguchi (JPN)
1958 Tokyo	Hiroko Uchida (JPN)	Seiko Obonai (JPN)	Huang Chun-men (ROC)
1962 Jakarta	Keiko Murase (JPN)	Seiko Obonai (JPN)	Josephine de la Viña (PHI)
1966 Bangkok	Josephine de la Viña (PHI)	Yuko Tsunoda (JPN)	Han Dong-si (KOR)
1970 Bangkok	Teruko Yagishita (JPN)	Yoko Saito (JPN)	Paik Ok-ja (KOR)
1974 Tehran	Gao Yukui (CHN)	Dashzevegiin Namjilmaa (MGL)	Matsuko Takahashi (JPN)
1978 Bangkok	Li Xiaohui (CHN)	Wang Dan (CHN)	Matsuko Takahashi (JPN)
1982 New Delhi	Li Xiaohui (CHN)	Xin Xiaoyan (CHN)	Harumi Suzuki (JPN)
1986 Seoul	Hou Xuemei (CHN)	Li Xiaohui (CHN)	Lee Sang-yuk (KOR)
1990 Beijing	Hou Xuemei (CHN)	Yu Hourun (CHN)	Ikuko Kitamori (JPN)
1994 Hiroshima	Min Chunfeng (CHN)	Ikuko Kitamori (JPN)	Miyoko Nakanishi (JPN)
1998 Bangkok	Luan Zhili (CHN)	Liu Fengying (CHN)	Neelam Jaswant Singh (IND)
2002 Busan	Neelam Jaswant Singh (IND)	Song Aimin (CHN)	Ma Shuli (CHN)
2006 Doha	Song Aimin (CHN)	Ma Xuejun (CHN)	Krishna Poonia (IND)
2010 Guangzhou	Li Yanfeng (CHN)	Song Aimin (CHN)	Krishna Poonia (IND)
2014 Incheon	Seema Punia (IND)	Lu Xiaoxin (CHN)	Tan Jian (CHN)
2018 Jakarta–Palembang	Chen Yang (CHN)	Feng Bin (CHN)	Seema Punia (IND)
2022 Hangzhou	Feng Bin (CHN)	Jiang Zhichao (CHN)	Seema Punia (IND)
2026 Aichi–Nagoya	Feng Bin (CHN)	Jiang Zhichao (CHN)	Subenrat Insaeng (THA)

=== Hammer throw ===
Games	Gold	Silver	Bronze
2002 Busan	Gu Yuan (CHN)	Liu Yinghui (CHN)	Masumi Aya (JPN)
2006 Doha	Zhang Wenxiu (CHN)	Gu Yuan (CHN)	Masumi Aya (JPN)
2010 Guangzhou	Zhang Wenxiu (CHN)	Wang Zheng (CHN)	Yuka Murofushi (JPN)
2014 Incheon	Zhang Wenxiu (CHN)	Wang Zheng (CHN)	Manju Bala (IND)
2018 Jakarta–Palembang	Luo Na (CHN)	Wang Zheng (CHN)	Hitomi Katsuyama (JPN)
2022 Hangzhou	Wang Zheng (CHN)	Zhao Jie (CHN)	Kim Tae-hui (KOR)
2026 Aichi–Nagoya	Zhang Jiale (CHN)	Zhao Jie (CHN)	Joy McArthur (JPN)

=== Javelin throw ===
Games	Gold	Silver	Bronze
1951 New Delhi	Toyoko Yoshino (JPN)	Miyoko Kato (JPN)	Barbara Webster (IND)
1954 Manila	Akiko Kurihara (JPN)	Yasuko Inden (JPN)	Vivencia Subido (PHI)
1958 Tokyo	Yoriko Shida (JPN)	Elizabeth Davenport (IND)	Karnah Soekarta (INA)
1962 Jakarta	Hiroko Sato (JPN)	Fujie Abe (JPN)	Elizabeth Davenport (IND)
1966 Bangkok	Misako Katayama (JPN)	Sachiko Senzaki (JPN)	Marcelina Alonso (PHI)
1970 Bangkok	Nobuko Morita (JPN)	Sakiko Hara (JPN)	Lee Bok-soon (KOR)
1974 Tehran	Zhou Maojia (CHN)	Mieko Takasaka (JPN)	Keiko Myogai (JPN)
1978 Bangkok	Yao Ruiying (CHN)	Naomi Shibusawa (JPN)	Li Xia (CHN)
1982 New Delhi	Emi Matsui (JPN)	Li Shufen (CHN)	Minori Mori (JPN)
1986 Seoul	Li Baolian (CHN)	Emi Matsui (JPN)	Jang Sun-hee (KOR)
1990 Beijing	Zhang Li (CHN)	Xu Demei (CHN)	Emi Matsui (JPN)
1994 Hiroshima	Oksana Yarygina (UZB)	Lee Young-sun (KOR)	Ha Xiaoyan (CHN)
1998 Bangkok	Lee Young-sun (KOR)	Liang Lili (CHN)	Gurmeet Kaur (IND)
2002 Busan	Lee Young-sun (KOR)	Liang Lili (CHN)	Ha Xiaoyan (CHN)
2006 Doha	Buoban Pamang (THA)	Ma Ning (CHN)	Yuki Ebihara (JPN)
2010 Guangzhou	Yuki Ebihara (JPN)	Xue Juan (CHN)	Li Lingwei (CHN)
2014 Incheon	Zhang Li (CHN)	Li Lingwei (CHN)	Annu Rani (IND)
2018 Jakarta–Palembang	Liu Shiying (CHN)	Lü Huihui (CHN)	Gim Gyeong-ae (KOR)
2022 Hangzhou	Annu Rani (IND)	Dilhani Lekamge (SRI)	Lü Huihui (CHN)
2026 Aichi–Nagoya	Yan Ziyi (CHN)	Haruka Kitaguchi (JPN)	Sae Takemoto (JPN)

=== Heptathlon ===
- Pentathlon: 1966–1978

Games	Gold	Silver	Bronze
1966 Bangkok	Michiko Okamoto (JPN)	Yeh Chu-mei (ROC)	Lolita Lagrosas (PHI)
1970 Bangkok	Esther Shahamorov (ISR)	Lin Chun-yu (ROC)	Lolita Lagrosas (PHI)
1974 Tehran	Kyoko Shimizu (JPN)	Sun Yuxiang (CHN)	Zhang Yumei (CHN)
1978 Bangkok	Ye Peisu (CHN)	Angel Mary Joseph (IND)	Guo Yu (CHN)
1982 New Delhi	Ye Peisu (CHN)	Ye Lianying (CHN)	Tomoko Uchida (JPN)
1986 Seoul	Zhu Yuqing (CHN)	Ye Lianying (CHN)	Ji Jeong-mi (KOR)
1990 Beijing	Ma Miaolan (CHN)	Dong Yuping (CHN)	Ma Chun-ping (TPE)
1994 Hiroshima	Ghada Shouaa (SYR)	Zhang Xiaohui (CHN)	Ma Chun-ping (TPE)
1998 Bangkok	Shen Shengfei (CHN)	Svetlana Kazanina (KAZ)	Ma Chun-ping (TPE)
2002 Busan	Shen Shengfei (CHN)	Soma Biswas (IND)	J. J. Shobha (IND)
2006 Doha	Olga Rypakova (KAZ)	Soma Biswas (IND)	J. J. Shobha (IND)
2010 Guangzhou	Yuliya Tarasova (UZB)	Yuki Nakata (JPN)	Pramila Aiyappa (IND)
2014 Incheon	Ekaterina Voronina (UZB)	Wang Qingling (CHN)	Yuliya Tarasova (UZB)
2018 Jakarta–Palembang	Swapna Barman (IND)	Wang Qingling (CHN)	Yuki Yamasaki (JPN)
2022 Hangzhou	Zheng Ninali (CHN)	Ekaterina Voronina (UZB)	Nandini Agasara (IND)
2026 Aichi-Nagoya	Yuri Tanaka (JPN)	Nanaka Kajiki (JPN)	Alina Chistyakova (KAZ)

== Mixed ==
=== 4 × 100 m relay ===
Games	Gold	Silver	Bronze
2026 Aichi–Nagoya	China (CHN); Chen Jinfeng; Liu Guoyi; Shi Junhao; Chen Yujie	Thailand (THA); Natawat Iamudom; Supanich Poolkerd; Puripol Boonson; Jirapat Khanonta	India (IND); Gurindervir Singh; Sneha Gowda; Animesh Kujur; Harita Bhadra

=== 4 × 400 m relay ===
Games	Gold	Silver	Bronze
2018 Jakarta–Palembang	India (IND); Muhammed Anas; M. R. Poovamma; Hima Das; Arokia Rajiv	Kazakhstan (KAZ); Svetlana Golendova; Dmitriy Koblov; Elina Mikhina; Mikhail Litvin	China (CHN); Cheng Chong; Yang Lei; Huang Guifen; Wu Yuang
2022 Hangzhou	Bahrain (BRN); Musa Isah; Kemi Adekoya; Abbas Yusuf Ali; Salwa Eid Naser	India (IND); Muhammad Ajmal Variyathodi; Vithya Ramraj; Rajesh Ramesh; Subha Venkatesan	Kazakhstan (KAZ); Yefim Tarassov; Adelina Zems; Dmitriy Koblov; Alexandra Zalyubovskaya
2026 Aichi–Nagoya	Bahrain (BRN); Salwa Eid Naser; Alaa Sami; Musa Isah; Aisha Abdullah	India (IND); Poovamma Machettira; Vishal T. K. Vithya Ramraj; Manu T. S.	Vietnam (VIE); Nguyễn Thị Ngọc; Quách Thị Lan; Tạ Ngọc Tưởng; Lê Ngọc Phúc

=== 35 km walk team ===
Games	Gold	Silver	Bronze
2022 Hangzhou	China (CHN); Wang Qin; Qieyang Shijie; He Xianghong; Bai Xueying	Japan (JPN); Subaru Ishida; Masumi Fuchise; Maika Yagi	India (IND); Ram Baboo; Manju Rani
