= I Yeongsuk =

I Yeongsuk (Korean: 이영숙) may refer to:

- Lee Young-sook (born 1965), South Korean sprinter
- Lee Young-suk (born 1970), South Korean badminton player
