= Josephine de la Viña =

Filipino discus thrower

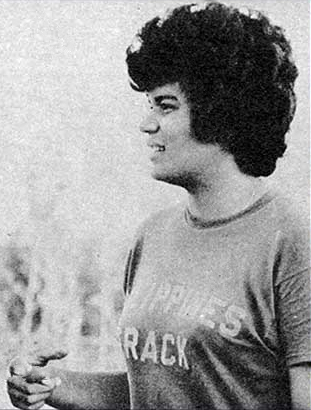
- De la Viña at the 1974 Asian Games

Personal information
- Born: April 15, 1946 Santa Barbara, Iloilo, Philippine Commonwealth (Note: De la Viña was born in the part of Santa Barabara that is now part of New Lucena)
- Died: November 4, 2011 (aged 65) Jaro, Iloilo City, Philippines
- Height: 183 cm (6 ft 0 in)
- Weight: 73 kg (161 lb)

Sport
- Sport: Athletics
- Events: Discus Throw, Shot Put

Achievements and titles
- Personal best: 54.71 m (1971)
Medal record
Women's athletics
Representing Philippines
Asian Games
Gold medal – first place	1966 Bangkok	Discus throw
Bronze medal – third place	1962 Jakarta	Discus throw
Asian Championships
Gold medal – first place	1973 Marikina	Discus throw

Josephine de la Viña (April 15, 1946 – November 4, 2011) was a discus thrower from the Philippines who is considered as her country's greatest athlete in the event. She won gold medals in her pet event at the 1966 Asian Games and 1973 Asian Athletics Championships. She also competed at the 1964, 1968 and 1972 Olympics.

== Personal life ==
Born in Iloilo to a Mexican-American father and a Cebuana mother, de la Viña spent her elementary and high school years in Cebu where she excelled in softball and athletics. She later earned a scholarship at Cebu Institute of Technology.

De la Viña was nicknamed "Big Jo" for her hefty six-foot frame and her trademark afro hairstyle, which made her an imposing presence on the field.

== Career ==
Dela Viña eventually gave up softball and concentrated on throwing events in athletics like discus, javelin and shot put after being persuaded by school officials to develop her potential.

She was just 18 years old when she won a bronze medal in discus throw at the 1962 Asian Games, placing behind Japanese Keiko Murase and Seiko Obonai. Two years later, Dela Viña competed at the 1964 Summer Olympics where she placed 18th among 21 starters.

At the 1966 Asian Games, Dela Viña threw the discus at a distance of 47.58m to set a new Games record en route to winning the gold medal. She also competed in shot put where she placed fourth overall. At the 1968 Summer Olympics, the hefty Cebuana registered 46.56m to place 15th out of 16 entries. She was the only Asian competitor in the field.

Dela Viña was back at the 1970 Asian Games but failed to land a medal. Two years later, she made her third Olympic appearance at the 1972 Summer Olympics where she barely missed making the final round. The Filipina had a best effort of 53.92m to place 13th overall.

In the inaugural Asian Athletics Championships held in Marikina in 1973, Dela Viña threw the discus at a record distance 50.74m to comfortably win the gold medal. By doing so, she became the first Filipino athlete to win a gold medal in both the Asian Games and Asian Athletics Championships - a feat matched only by sprinter Lydia De Vega.

She withdrew from the 1974 Asian Games to visit her father, who suddenly fell ill in the United States.

== Death ==
Dela Viña died on November 4, 2011, in Iloilo at the age of 65. The cause of her death was not known.

== Legacy ==
Dela Viña's personal best throw of 54.71m, which she set during the 1971 USA Outdoor Track and Field Championships in Bakersfield, remains a national record to this day. She also holds the second-best mark of 53.92m, which she achieved during the qualification round of the 1972 Summer Olympics. She is the only Filipina discus thrower in history to breach the 50m mark and her record is expected to last for many more decades. Dela Viña also held the national shot put record from 1970 to 1975.

In 2018, Dela Viña was posthumously inducted into the Philippine Sports Hall of Fame.
