= Mikiko Sone =

Japanese high jumper

Personal information
- Nationality: Japanese
- Born: 24 October 1952 (age 72)

Sport
- Sport: Athletics
- Event: High jump

Mikiko Sone (曽根 幹子, Sone Mikiko; born 24 October 1952) is a Japanese athlete. She competed in the women's high jump at the 1976 Summer Olympics. Following her athletics career, she became a professor of sports science at Hiroshima City University.

== See also ==
- List of Asian Games medalists in athletics
