= Kosei Gushiken =

Japanese triple jumper (born 1942)

Personal information
- Born: 10 June 1942 (age 84) Nakijin, Okinawa, Japan

Sport
- Sport: Track and field
Medal record
Representing Japan
Asian Games
Gold medal – first place	1966 Bangkok	Triple jump

Kosei Gushiken (具志堅 興清, Gushiken Kōsei; born 10 June 1942) is a Japanese former triple jumper who competed in the 1972 Summer Olympics.
