= Ali Baghbanbashi =

Iranian long-distance runner (1924–2021)

Ali Baghbanbashi علی باغبان‌‌باشی
Personal information
- Nationality: Iranian
- Born: 6 September 1924 Torghabeh, Iran
- Died: 28 October 2021 (aged 97) Mashhad, Iran
Medal record
Men's athletics
Representing Iran
Asian Games
Gold medal – first place	1951 New Delhi	5000 m
Silver medal – second place	1951 New Delhi	3000 m
Bronze medal – third place	1958 Tokyo	5000 m
Bronze medal – third place	1958 Tokyo	10000 m

Ali Baghbanbashi (Persian: علی باغبان‌‌باشی; 6 September 1924 – 28 October 2021) was an Iranian long-distance runner who competed in the 1952 Summer Olympics and in the 1956 Summer Olympics, and also in the 1951 Asian Games and 1958 Asian Games. He was born in Torghabeh, Iran, and specialized in the 3000 metres, 5000 metres, 10000 metres, and marathon.

He lighted the cauldron during the opening ceremony of 1974 Asian Games.
