= Christine Forage =

Indian athlete

Personal information
- Nationality: Indian
- Born: 1949 Bombay, India

Sport
- Country: India
- Sport: Athletics
Medal record
Women's athletics
Representing India
Asian Games
| Bronze medal – third place | 1966 Bangkok | Long jump |

Christine Forage is an Indian athlete. She won a bronze medal in long jump in 1966 Asian Games. Born in an Anglo-Indian family, she won the silver medal in the high jump at the 1961 National Games at Trivandrum.
