= Thambu Krishnan =

Malaysian sprinter (1944–2023)

Personal information
- Full name: Thambusamy Krishnan
- Nationality: Malaysian
- Born: 8 July 1944 Penang, Japanese-occupied Malaya
- Died: 20 December 2023 (aged 79) Penang, Malaysia

Sport
- Sport: Sprinting
- Event: 400 metres

Thambu Krishnan (8 July 1944 – 20 December 2023) was a Malaysian sprinter. He competed in the men's 400 metres at the 1972 Summer Olympics. Krishnan died on 20 December 2023, at the age of 79.
