= Joginder Singh (athlete) =

Indian athlete

- Born: India
- Occupation: Athlete
- Known for: Arjuna Award

Capt. Joginder Singh was an Indian athlete who won the Arjuna award in 1968.
