= Asir Victor =

Malaysian sprinter (1940–2021)

Personal information
- Nationality: Malaysian
- Born: Asirvatham Victor; 25 September 1940 Ipoh, Malaysia
- Died: 11 May 2021 (aged 80) Ipoh, Malaysia

Sport
- Sport: Sprinting
- Event: 400 metres

Asir Victor (25 September 1940 – 11 May 2021) was a Malaysian sprinter. Individually he won bronze medals at the 1965 and 1967 Southeast Asian Peninsular Games. He also competed in the men's 400 metres at the 1968 Summer Olympics. In relay races, he competed in the 4 × 400 metres relay at the 1964 Summer Olympics without reaching the final.

He died on 11 May 2021.
