= Shosuke Suzuki =

Japanese decathlete (born 1936)

Personal information
- Nationality: Japanese
- Born: 11 November 1936 (age 89) Hamamatsu, Japan

Sport
- Sport: Athletics
- Event: Decathlon

Shosuke Suzuki (鈴木 章介, Suzuki Shōsuke; born 11 November 1936) is a Japanese decathlete. He competed in the men's decathlon at the 1964 Summer Olympics.
