= Kim Jae-ryong (athlete) =

South Korean marathon runner

Medal record

Men's athletics

Representing South Korea

Asian Championships
Bronze medal – third place	1991 Kuala Lumpur	10,000 m

Kim Jae-Ryong (born 25 April 1966) is a South Korean retired long-distance runner who specialized in the marathon.

== Achievements ==
Year	Competition	Venue	Position	Notes
Representing South Korea
1990	Asian Games	Beijing, China	2nd	10,000 m
1991	Asian Championships	Kuala Lumpur, Malaysia	3rd	10,000 m
1992	Olympic Games	Barcelona, Spain	10th	Marathon
1993	Boston Marathon	Boston, United States	2nd	Marathon
1993	World Championships	Stuttgart, Germany	4th	Marathon
1994	Asian Games	Hiroshima, Japan	3rd	Marathon

=== Personal bests ===
- Marathon - 2:09.30 hours (1992)
