= Ajmer Singh (athlete) =

Indian sprinter

- Born: 1 February 1940; Kup Kalan, Sangrur district, Punjab
- Died: 26 January 2010 (aged 69); Chandigarh
- Occupations: sprinter, academic

Olympic medal record

Men's Athletics

Representing IND

1966 Asian Games
Gold medal – first place	1966 Bangkok	400 m
Silver medal – second place	1966 Bangkok	200 m

Ajmer Singh (1 February 1940 – 26 January 2010) was an Indian sprinter who competed in the 1964 Summer Olympics, was a gold medalist at the 1966 Asian Games, in Bangkok, and later served as Director of Sports, Punjab University, Chandigarh.

== Early life and education ==
He was born in a Jat Sikh farmer family of Kartar Singh Aulakh and Bachan Kaur Aulakh, at Kup Kalan village in the Sangrur district of Punjab.

He graduated from Government College, Malerkotla, and later did his Bachelor of Physical Education (B.P.E.] from Lakshmibai National College of Physical Education, Gwalior. This was followed by M.A. from Punjab University, Chandigarh, and finally, he also did his PhD from Punjab University Chandigarh.

Ajmer Singh is the only Indian with a PhD in physical education to receive the Arjuna Award from the Government of India. He came from humble beginnings and was known as an administrator, coach, teacher, mentor, disciplinarian, and family man.

Up to middle school level education, Ajmer had to walk to the neighbouring village of Rohira, some 2 miles (about 4 kilometers) from village Kup. Family being very poor, Ajmer walked bare feet, rain or shine, winters or summers, dressed in rags through thorny paths to school, and yet achieved first division at all school level examinations. There was no electricity in those days, and he would sit at night by a small oil lamp and study, as he would be out helping with all family chores at home and in the fields during daylight.

As a child, Ajmer suffered from malnutrition and had knock knees when he was growing up. Despite these setbacks, he was able to become an Olympian athlete, and an Asian champion in sprinting. He had only one regret in his life, never getting to know his mother, as she died when he was young.

== Career ==
He took part in the 1964 Tokyo Olympics, two years later at the 1966 Asian Games held at Bangkok, he won a gold in 400 metres, and a silver in 200 metres.

Was on deputation as Special Education Officer to Federal Govt. of Nigeria from 1976 to 1979. While in Nigeria, Ajmer coached Daghba Minha who was his student at Federal Government Girls' College, Abuloma, Portharcourt, Nigeria, in athletics. Minha, under the able and dedicated guidance of Ajmer, became Nigeria's national champion in Shot Put and Discus Throw.

He also remained vice-chancellor of Laxmibai National Institute of Physical Education, Gwalior and Maulana Abul Kalam Chair and Director Sports, at the Punjab University, Chandigarh.

He died in Chandigarh in the morning of 26 January 2010, at the age of 70, and is survived by his wife, two sons and grandchildren.

He was awarded the second highest sports award, the Arjuna Award by Government of India in 1966.

Two years before his death, Ajmer had declared his body be donated for medical research to Post Graduate Institute of Medical Education and Research at Chandigarh. Also, he Ajmer had declared that no memorials be made/constructed in his memory in any form. Both his wishes were fulfilled by his family.
