= Tomio Ota =

Japanese triple jumper

Personal information
- Nationality: Japanese
- Born: 21 October 1936 (age 89) Shizuoka, Japan
- Height: 178 cm (5 ft 10 in)
- Weight: 60 kg (132 lb)

Sport
- Sport: Athletics
- Event: Triple jump
- Club: Waseda University, Tokyo
Medal record
Representing Japan
Asian Games
Silver medal – second place	1962 Jakarta	Triple jump
Bronze medal – third place	1958 Tokyo	Triple jump
Summer Universiade
Bronze medal – third place	1961 Sofia	Triple jump

Tomio Ota (太田 富夫, Ōta Tomio; born 21 October 1936) is a Japanese athlete. He competed in the men's triple jump at the 1960 Summer Olympics and the 1964 Summer Olympics.

Ota won the British AAA Championships title in the triple jump event at the 1962 AAA Championships.
