= Hirokazu Yasuda =

Japanese hurdler

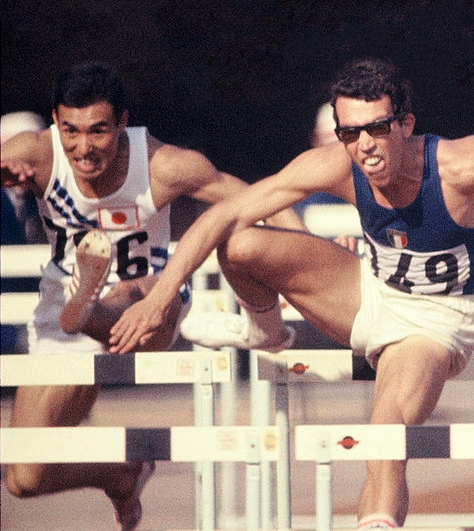
- Hirokazu Yasuda (left) at the 1964 Olympics

Personal information
- Born: May 31, 1936 (age 90)
- Height: 1.72 m (5 ft 8 in)
- Weight: 66 kg (146 lb)

Sport
- Sport: Athletics
- Event: 110 m hurdles

Achievements and titles
- Personal best: 110 mH – 14.30 (1964)
Medal record
Representing Japan
Asian Games
Bronze medal – third place	1958 Tokyo	110 m hurdles
Bronze medal – third place	1962 Jakarta	110 m hurdles

Hirokazu Yasuda (安田 寛一, born May 31, 1936) is a retired Japanese hurdler who competed at the 1964 Olympics. He won two bronze medals in the 110 m hurdles at the Asian Games.
