= Nobuyoshi Miura =

Japanese middle-distance runner

Personal information
- Born: 11 May 1944 (age 82) Ōita Prefecture, Japan

Sport
- Sport: Track and field
Medal record
Representing Japan
Asian Games
Gold medal – first place	1970 Bangkok	3000m steeplechase
Bronze medal – third place	1966 Bangkok	3000m steeplechase
Summer Universiade
Bronze medal – third place	1967 Tokyo	3000m steeplechase

Nobuyoshi Miura (三浦 信由, Nobuyoshi Miura; born 11 May 1944) is a Japanese former middle-distance runner who competed in the 1968 Summer Olympics.
