= Chen Ying-long =

Taiwanese sprinter

Personal information
- Born: 15 January 1926 Beigang, Yunlin, Japanese Taiwan
- Died: 22 July 2011 (aged 85) Taiwan

Sport
- Sport: Sprinting
- Event: 400 metres

Chen Ying-long (Chinese: 陳英郎; pinyin: Chén Yīngláng; 15 January 1926 – 22 July 2011) was a Taiwanese sprinter. He competed for the Republic of China in the men's 400 metres at the 1948 Summer Olympics.
