= Debra Marcus =

British-born Israeli athlete

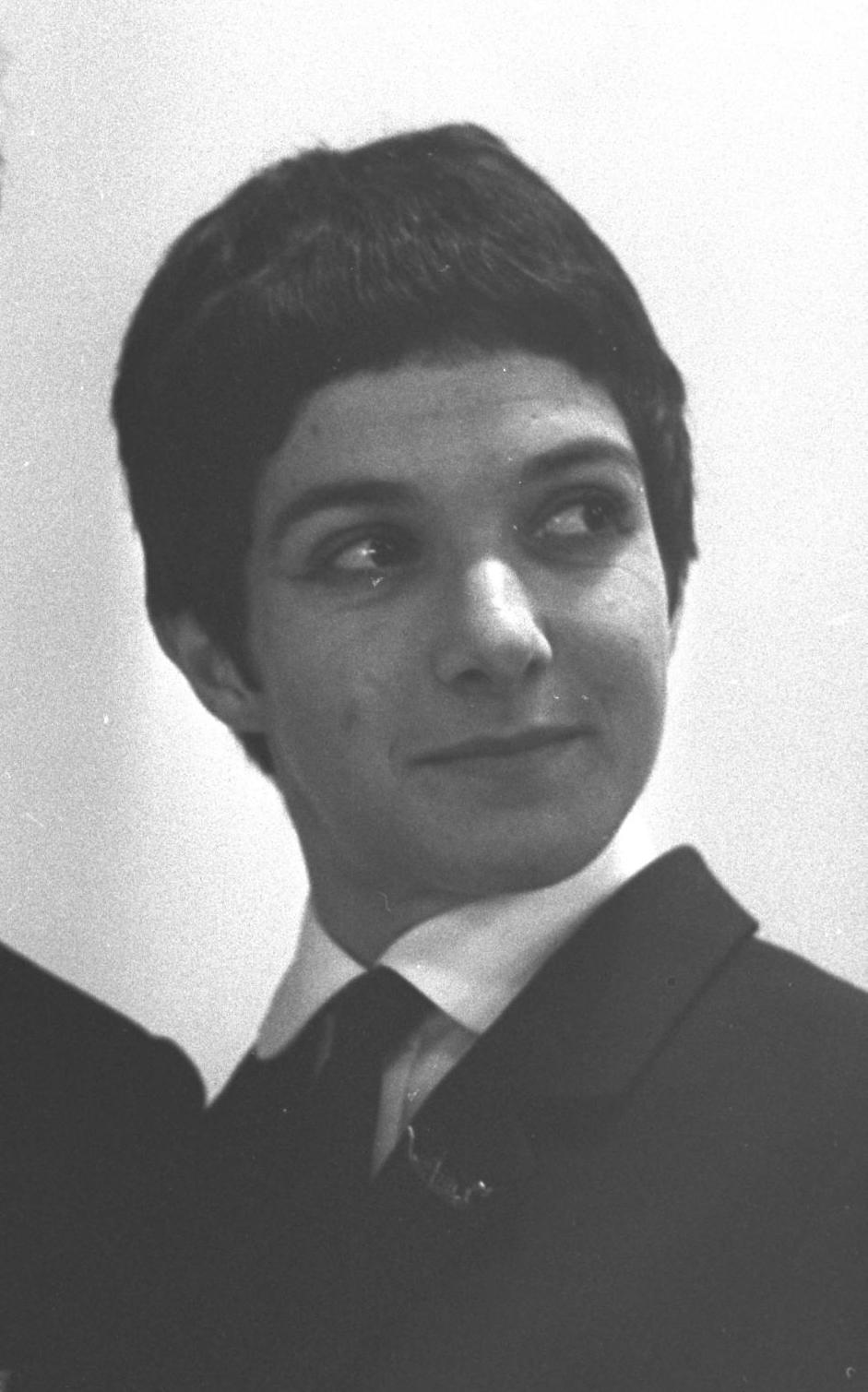

Personal information
- Native name: דבורה מרכוס
- Nickname: Debbie
- Nationality: Israeli
- Born: Debra Turner; 1941 (age 84–85)

Sport
- Country: Israel
- Sport: Athletics
Medal record
Women's athletics
Representing Israel
Asian Games
| Gold medal – first place | 1966 Bangkok | 200 m |
| Bronze medal – third place | 1966 Bangkok | 100 m |

Debra Marcus (Hebrew: דברה מרכוס) is a British-born Israeli sprinter.

== Sports career ==
Debra (Debbie) Turner- Marcus won a gold medal in the 1966 Bangkok Asian Games in the 200 metres.She won a bronze medal in the 100-meter dash. She was one of a series of athletes who won medals at this event, receiving a warm reception from then Prime Minister Levi Eshkol upon their return.

Marcus came to the Maccabiah Games in 1957 as a member of the British team. After overcoming polio, she returned to Israel for 1961 Maccabiah Games, in which she won the 100-meter dash. That year, she decided to move to Israel permanently and worked as a high-school physical education teacher. She also worked with disabled children.

Honored as the final torchbearer, Marcus lit the ceremonial flame to open the 1965 Maccabiah Games.

In 1966, Marcus was named Israeli Sportswoman of the Year.

== See also ==
- Sports in Israel
- Women of Israel
