= Aouf Abdul-Rahman =

Iraqi sprinter

Personal information
- Nationality: Iraqi
- Born: Aouf Abdul-Rahman Youssef; 24 November 1960 (age 64)

Sport
- Sport: Sprinting
- Event: 200 metres

Aouf Abdul-Rahman Youssef (born 24 November 1960) is an Iraqi sprinter. He competed in the men's 200 metres at the 1988 Summer Olympics.
