= Nobuko Kawano =

Japanese athlete

Personal information
- Nationality: Japanese

Sport
- Country: Japan
- Sport: Athletics
Medal record
Women's athletics
Representing Japan
Asian Games
Gold medal – first place	1974 Teheran	800 m
Gold medal – first place	1974 Teheran	4×400 m
Silver medal – second place	1970 Bangkok	800 m
Silver medal – second place	1974 Teheran	400 m
Bronze medal – third place	1970 Bangkok	400 m
Asian Championships
Gold medal – first place	1973 Marikina	400 m
Gold medal – first place	1973 Marikina	800 m

Nobuko Kawano is a Japanese athlete. She won the gold medal in the 800 metres event in the 1974 Asian Games.
