= Seiko Obonai =

Japanese shot putter (1940–2023)

Personal information
- Nationality: Japanese
- Born: 16 February 1940 Ninohe, Iwate, Japan
- Died: 6 March 2023 (aged 83) Tokyo, Japan

Sport
- Sport: Athletics
- Event: Shot put
Medal record
Representing Japan
Asian Games
Gold medal – first place	1958 Tokyo	Shot put
Gold medal – first place	1962 Jakarta	Shot put
Silver medal – second place	1958 Tokyo	Discus throw
Silver medal – second place	1962 Jakarta	Discus throw

Seiko Obonai (小保内 聖子, Obonai Seiko; 16 February 1940 – 6 March 2023) was a Japanese track and field athlete. She competed in the women's shot put at the 1964 Summer Olympics.
