= Lee Young-sook =

South Korean sprinter

Personal information
- Nationality: South Korean
- Born: 16 December 1965 (age 60)

Sport
- Sport: Sprinting
- Event: 100 metres
Medal record
Women's athletics
Representing South Korea
Asian Championships
Bronze medal – third place	1981 Tokyo	4×100 m

Lee Young-sook (born 16 December 1965) is a South Korean sprinter. She competed in the 100 metres at the 1984, 1988 and the 1996 Summer Olympics.
