= India at the 2025 World Aquatics Championships =

- Flag of India
- World Aquatics code: IND
- National federation: Swimming Federation of India
- Website: swimming.org.in

in Singapore
- Competitors: 19 in 3 sports
- Medals: Gold 0 Silver 0 Bronze 0 Total 0

World Aquatics Championships appearances
- 1973; 1975; 1978; 1982; 1986; 1991; 1994; 1998; 2001; 2003; 2005; 2007; 2009; 2011; 2013; 2015; 2017; 2019; 2022; 2023; 2024; 2025

India competed at the 2025 World Aquatics Championships in Singapore from July 11 to August 3, 2025.

== Competitors ==
The following is the list of competitors in the Championships.

Sport	Men	Women	Total
Diving	4	2	6
Open water swimming	4	3	7
Swimming	6	0	6
Total	14	5	19

== Diving ==
Men

Athlete	Event	Preliminaries		Semifinals		Final	
Athlete	Event	Points	Rank	Points	Rank	Points	Rank
Surajit Rajbanshi	1 m springboard	238.80	56	—		Did not advance	
Surajit Rajbanshi	3 m springboard	271.70	60	Did not advance			
Indiver Sairem	10 m platform	253.90	46	Did not advance			
Wilson Singh Ningthoujam	10 m platform	233.00	47	Did not advance			
Premson Yumnam	1 m springboard	219.15	59	—		Did not advance	
Premson Yumnam	3 m springboard	261.70	63	Did not advance			
Surajit Rajbanshi; Premson Yumnam	3 m synchro springboard	254.04	26	—		Did not advance	
Wilson Singh Ningthoujam; Indiver Sairem	10 m synchro platform	299.88	19	—		Did not advance	

Women

Athlete	Event	Preliminaries		Semifinals		Final	
Athlete	Event	Points	Rank	Points	Rank	Points	Rank
Palak Sharma	3 m springboard	127.95	52	Did not advance			
Palak Sharma	10 m platform	132.10	37	Did not advance			
Shravani Suryawanshi	3 m springboard	138.90	51	Did not advance			
Shravani Suryawanshi	10 m platform	146.40	35	Did not advance			

== Open water swimming ==
Men

Athlete	Event	Heat		Semi-final		Final	
Athlete	Event	Time	Rank	Time	Rank	Time	Rank
Dhrupad Ramakrishna	Men's 5 km	—				1:07:25.1	67
Prashans Hiremagalur	Men's 3 km knockout sprints	18:40.9	26	Did not advance			
Prashans Hiremagalur	Men's 5 km	—				1:04:27.7	60
Army Pal	Men's 3 km knockout sprints	19:42.0	28	Did not advance			
Army Pal	Men's 10 km	—				2:23:32.9	59
Anurag Singh	Men's 10 km	—				2:20:53.1	56

Women

Athlete	Event	Heat		Semi-final		Final	
Athlete	Event	Time	Rank	Time	Rank	Time	Rank
Purva Gawade	Women's 5 km	—				OTL	
Meenakshi Menon	Women's 3 km knockout sprints	20:39.4	28	Did not advance			
Meenakshi Menon	Women's 5 km	—				1:16:42.4	67
Diksha Yadav	Women's 3 km knockout sprints	20:02.0	25	Did not advance			
Diksha Yadav	Women's 10 km	—				OTL	

Mixed

Athlete	Event	Time	Rank
Prashans Hiremagalur; Diksha Yadav; Meenakshi Menon; Army Pal	Team relay	1:20:59.8	20

== Swimming ==
India entered 6 swimmers.

Men

Athlete	Event	Heat		Semi-final		Final	
Athlete	Event	Time	Rank	Time	Rank	Time	Rank
Benedicton Rohit	50 m butterfly	24.26	45	Did not advance			
Benedicton Rohit	100 m butterfly	53.92	47	Did not advance			
Shoan Ganguly	200 m individual medley	2:05.40	38	Did not advance			
Shoan Ganguly	400 m individual medley	4:30.40	28	—		Did not advance	
Aryan Nehra	400 m freestyle	4:00.39	37	—		Did not advance	
Aryan Nehra	800 m freestyle	8:21.30	23	—		Did not advance	
Sajan Prakash	200 m freestyle	1:51.57	43	Did not advance			
Sajan Prakash	200 m butterfly	1:59.33	24	Did not advance			
Kushagra Rawat	1500 m freestyle	15:47.43	19	—		Did not advance	
Likhith Selvaraj Prema	50 m breaststroke	28.45	50	Did not advance			
Likhith Selvaraj Prema	100 m breaststroke	1:01.99	40	Did not advance			
