= UAAP overall championships =

Overall championship

UAAP overall championship
- Most titles: Seniors' division: UST Growling Tigers (49 titles); Juniors' division: UST Tiger Cubs (25 titles)

The University Athletic Association of the Philippines (UAAP) Overall Championship is awarded to the school with the highest point total in the different UAAP events. It was first awarded in UAAP Season 10. Member universities currently compete in fifteen sports to vie for the overall championship, namely, badminton, baseball, basketball, beach volleyball, chess, fencing, football, judo, softball, swimming, table tennis, taekwondo, tennis, track and field, and volleyball.

The University of Santo Tomas holds the distinction of having the most overall championships with 74 titles wherein it won 49 collegiate division overall championships in the 78 seasons that the title was awarded and 25 high school division overall championships out of 30 seasons.

== Point system ==
The current point system gives 15 points to the champion team in a certain UAAP event, 12 to the runner-up, and 10 to the third placer. The following points are given in consequent order of finish: 8, 6, 4, 2 and 1.

== List of overall champions ==
Key
Indicator	Meaning
	School won both juniors' and seniors' championship in the same year
(#)	Number of titles won at the time

=== Early years ===
The UAAP was founded in 1938 by Far Eastern University (FEU), National University (NU), the University of the Philippines (UP) and the University of Santo Tomas (UST).

Season	Year	Juniors' division	Seniors' division	Host school	Ref.
10	1947–48	Not awarded	Far Eastern University (1)	Far Eastern University	
11	1948–49	Not awarded	Far Eastern University (2)	National University	
12	1949–50	Not awarded	Far Eastern University (3)	University of the Philippines	
13	1950–51	Not awarded	Far Eastern University (4)	University of Santo Tomas	
14	1951–52	Not awarded	Far Eastern University (5)	Far Eastern University	

=== First expansion ===
In 1952, Adamson University, Manila Central University (MCU), the University of Manila (UM) and the University of the East (UE) were added as probationary members; after two years, only MCU and UE were retained. MCU then pulled out of the league in 1962. In 1970, Adamson was readmitted to the league.

Season	Year	Juniors' division	Seniors' division	Host school	Ref.
15	1952–53	Not awarded	Far Eastern University (6)	National University	
16	1953–54	Not awarded	Far Eastern University (7)	University of the Philippines	
17	1954–55	Not awarded	Far Eastern University (8)	University of Santo Tomas	
18	1955–56	Not awarded	Far Eastern University (9)	Far Eastern University	
19	1956–57	Not awarded	Far Eastern University (10)	National University	
20	1957–58	Not awarded	Far Eastern University (11)	University of the Philippines	
21	1958–59	Not awarded	University of Santo Tomas (1)	University of the East	
22	1959–60	Not awarded	Far Eastern University (12)	University of Santo Tomas	
23	1960–61	Not awarded	University of Santo Tomas (2)	Manila Central University	
24	1961–62	Not awarded	University of Santo Tomas (3)	Far Eastern University	
25	1962–63	Not awarded	University of Santo Tomas (4)	National University	
26	1963–64	Not awarded	University of Santo Tomas (5)	University of the Philippines	
27	1964–65	Not awarded	University of Santo Tomas (6)	University of the East	
28	1965–66	Not awarded	University of the East (1)	University of Santo Tomas	
29	1966–67	Not awarded	Far Eastern University (13)	Far Eastern University	
30	1967–68	Not awarded	University of Santo Tomas (7)	National University	
31	1968–69	Not awarded	Far Eastern University (14)	University of the Philippines	
32	1969–70	Not awarded	University of the East (2)	University of the East	
33	1970–71	Not awarded	University of Santo Tomas (8)	University of Santo Tomas	
34	1971–72	Not awarded	University of the East (3)	Far Eastern University	
35	1972–73	Not awarded	University of the East (4)	National University	
36	1973–74	Not awarded	Far Eastern University (15)	University of the Philippines	
37	1974–75	Not awarded	University of the East (5)	Adamson University	
38	1975–76	Not awarded	University of Santo Tomas (9)	University of the East	
39	1976–77	Not awarded	University of Santo Tomas (10)	University of Santo Tomas	
40	1977–78	Not awarded	University of the Philippines Diliman (1)	Far Eastern University	

=== Second expansion ===
Ateneo de Manila University (AdMU) was added in 1978.

Season	Year	Juniors' division	Seniors' division	Host school	Ref.
41	1978–79	Not awarded	University of the Philippines Diliman (2)	National University	
42	1979–80	Ateneo de Manila University (1)	University of Santo Tomas (11)	University of the Philippines	
43	1980–81	Not awarded	University of the Philippines Diliman (3)	Ateneo de Manila University	
44	1981–82	Not awarded	Far Eastern University (16)	Adamson University	
45	1982–83	Not awarded	University of the Philippines Diliman (4); University of Santo Tomas (12)	University of the East	
46	1983–84	Not awarded	University of Santo Tomas (13)	University of the Philippines	
47	1984–85	Not awarded	University of Santo Tomas (14)	University of Santo Tomas	
48	1985–86	Not awarded	University of Santo Tomas (15)	Far Eastern University	

=== Third expansion ===
In 1986, De La Salle University (DLSU) was added.

Season	Year	Juniors' division	Seniors' division	Host school	Ref.
49	1986–87	Not awarded	National University (1)	National University	
50	1987–88	Not awarded	University of Santo Tomas (16)	Ateneo de Manila University	
51	1988–89	Not awarded	University of Santo Tomas (17)	De La Salle University	
52	1989–90	Not awarded	University of Santo Tomas (18)	Adamson University	
53	1990–91	Not awarded	University of Santo Tomas (19)	University of the East	
54	1991–92	Not awarded	University of Santo Tomas (20)	University of the Philippines	
55	1992–93	Not awarded	University of Santo Tomas (21)	University of Santo Tomas	

=== Final Four era ===
The current tournament format was introduced to the league.

Season	Year	High School division (Juniors' division prior to UAAP Season 82)	Collegiate division (Seniors' division prior to UAAP Season 82)	Host school	Ref.
56	1993–94	Not awarded	University of Santo Tomas (22)	Far Eastern University	
57	1994–95	Not awarded	University of Santo Tomas (23)	National University	
58	1995–96	University of Santo Tomas (1)	University of Santo Tomas (24)	Ateneo de Manila University	
59	1996–97	University of Santo Tomas (2)	University of Santo Tomas (25)	De La Salle University	
60	1997–98	University of Santo Tomas (3)	University of the Philippines Diliman (5)	Adamson University	
61	1998–99	University of Santo Tomas (4)	University of Santo Tomas (26)	University of the East	
62	1999–00	University of Santo Tomas (5)	University of Santo Tomas (27)	University of the Philippines	
63	2000–01	Ateneo de Manila University (2)	University of Santo Tomas (28)	University of Santo Tomas	
64	2001–02	Ateneo de Manila University (3)	University of Santo Tomas (29)	Far Eastern University	
65	2002–03	University of Santo Tomas (6)	University of Santo Tomas (30)	National University	
66	2003–04	University of Santo Tomas (7)	University of Santo Tomas (31)	Ateneo de Manila University	
67	2004–05	University of Santo Tomas (8)	University of Santo Tomas (32)	De La Salle University	
68	2005–06	University of the East (1)	University of Santo Tomas (33)	Adamson University	
69	2006–07	University of Santo Tomas (9)	University of Santo Tomas (34)	University of the East	
70	2007–08	University of Santo Tomas (10)	University of Santo Tomas (35)	University of Santo Tomas	
71	2008–09	University of Santo Tomas (11)	University of Santo Tomas (36)	University of the Philippines	
72	2009–10	University of Santo Tomas (12)	University of Santo Tomas (37)	Far Eastern University	
73	2010–11	University of Santo Tomas (13)	University of Santo Tomas (38)	De La Salle University	
74	2011–12	University of Santo Tomas (14)	University of Santo Tomas (39)	Ateneo de Manila University	
75	2012–13	University of Santo Tomas (15)	De La Salle University (1)	National University	
76	2013–14	University of the East (2)	De La Salle University (2)	Adamson University	
77	2014–15	University of Santo Tomas (16)	University of Santo Tomas (40)	University of the East	
78	2015–16	University of Santo Tomas (17)	De La Salle University (3)	University of the Philippines	
79	2016–17	University of Santo Tomas (18)	University of Santo Tomas (41)	University of Santo Tomas	
80	2017–18	University of Santo Tomas (19)	University of Santo Tomas (42)	Far Eastern University	
81	2018–19	University of Santo Tomas (20)	University of Santo Tomas (43)	National University	
82	2019–20	University of Santo Tomas (21)	University of Santo Tomas (44)	Ateneo de Manila University	
83	2020–21	Cancelled due to COVID-19 pandemic		De La Salle University	
84	2021–22	Cancelled due to COVID-19 pandemic	University of Santo Tomas (45)	De La Salle University	
85	2022–23	University of Santo Tomas (22)	University of Santo Tomas (46)	Adamson University	
86	2023–24	University of Santo Tomas (23)	University of Santo Tomas (47)	University of the East	
87	2024–25	University of Santo Tomas (24)	University of Santo Tomas (48)	University of the Philippines	
88	2025–26	University of Santo Tomas (25)	University of Santo Tomas (49)	University of Santo Tomas	

== Number of championships per university ==
School	Collegiate	High School	Total	Last Championship
University of Santo Tomas	49	25	74	2025–2026 (Both)
Far Eastern University	16	0	16	1981–82 (Collegiate)
University of the East	5	2	7	2013–14 (High School)
University of the Philippines Diliman	5	0	5	1997–98 (Collegiate)
De La Salle University	3	0	3	2015–16 (Collegiate)
Ateneo de Manila University	0	3	3	2001–02 (High School)
National University	1	0	1	1986–87 (Collegiate)
Adamson University	0	0	0	None

== Statistics ==
Last overall championship

- Seniors' division:
  - Adamson Soaring Falcons: none
  - Ateneo Blue Eagles: none
  - De La Salle Green Archers: Season 78 (2015–2016)
  - FEU Tamaraws: Season 44 (1981–1982)
  - NU Bulldogs: Season 49 (1986–1987)
  - UE Red Warriors: Season 37 (1974–1975)
  - UP Fighting Maroons: Season 60 (1997–1998)
  - UST Growling Tigers: Season 87 (2024–2025)

- Juniors' division:
  - Adamson Baby Falcons: none
  - Ateneo Blue Eaglets: Season 64 (2001–2002)
  - De La Salle Junior Archers: none
  - FEU Baby Tamaraws: none
  - NU Bullpups: none
  - UE Junior Warriors: Season 76 (2013–2014)
  - UPIS Junior Maroons: none
  - UST Tiger Cubs: Season 87 (2024–2025)

Overall championship streaks

^	Denotes active streak

Streak	Division	School	Seasons
14 seasons	Seniors	University of Santo Tomas	61 (1998–99) to 74 (2011–12)
11 seasons	Seniors	Far Eastern University	10 (1947–48) to 20 (1957–58)
10 seasons	Seniors	University of Santo Tomas	50 (1987–88) to 59 (1996–97)
9 seasons	Seniors	University of Santo Tomas	79 (2016–17) to 88 (2025–26)
5 seasons	Seniors	University of Santo Tomas	23 (1960–61) to 27 (1964–65)
4 seasons	Seniors	University of Santo Tomas	45 (1982–83) to 48 (1982–83)
2 seasons	Seniors	De La Salle University	75 (2012–13) to 76 (2013–14)
2 seasons	Seniors	University of the Philippines Diliman	40 (1977–78) to 41 (1978–79)
2 seasons	Seniors	University of the East	34 (1971–72) to 35 (1972–73)
9 seasons	Juniors	University of Santo Tomas	77 (2014–15) to 87 (2024–25)
7 seasons	Juniors	University of Santo Tomas	69 (2006–07) to 75 (2012–13)
5 seasons	Juniors	University of Santo Tomas	58 (1995–96) to 62 (1999–00)
3 seasons	Juniors	University of Santo Tomas	65 (2002–03) to 67 (2003–04)
2 seasons	Juniors	Ateneo de Manila University	63 (2000–01) to 64 (2001–02)

== Total UAAP Championships per school ==
The school left the league

School	Athletics	Badminton	Ballroom	Baseball	Basketball	3×3 basketball	Beach volleyball	Cheerdance	Chess	Esports	Football	Fencing	Judo	Softball	Street dance	Swimming	Table tennis	Taekwondo	Tennis	Volleyball	Total
University of Santo Tomas	27	5	1	26	45	3	25	8	18	0	39	4	37	1	6	89	58	48	22	42	504
Far Eastern University	51	7	0	13	40	1	7	4	38	0	39	1	0	19	1	17	15	3	8	55	319
University of the Philippines Diliman	25	15	5	11	12	0	0	8	7	0	21	6	17	4	4	41	8	2	6	12	204
University of the East	21	2	0	4	21	0	0	0	8	1	4	45	10	2	0	12	14	6	1	38	189
De La Salle University	2	6	0	10	18	3	1	0	15	3	17	0	1	0	4	20	18	13	14	31	176
Ateneo de Manila University	24	14	0	7	33	2	1	0	8	2	10	3	17	0	0	30	1	3	2	6	163
National University	1	9	0	5	20	3	7	9	15	0	1	0	0	2	1	2	7	13	14	25	134
Adamson University	8	0	0	12	17	0	4	1	8	0	0	0	0	21	0	0	2	0	6	4	83
Manila Central University	5	0	0	1	0	0	0	0	0	0	0	0	0	7	0	0	0	0	0	2	15
PAREF Southridge School	0	0	0	1	0	0	0	0	0	0	0	0	0	0	0	0	0	0	0	0	1
University of Manila	0	0	0	0	0	0	0	0	0	0	0	0	0	0	0	0	0	0	0	0	0
Claret School of Quezon City	0	0	0	0	0	0	0	0	0	0	0	0	0	0	0	0	0	0	0	0	0

Championship data as of March 13, 2026.

== See also ==
- NCAA General Championship
