= Philippines at the 1951 Asian Games =

- IOC code: PHI
- NOC: Philippine Olympic Committee
- Website: www.olympic.ph (in English)

in New Delhi
- Medals Ranked 5th: Gold 5 Silver 6 Bronze 8 Total 19

Asian Games appearances (overview)
- 1951; 1954; 1958; 1962; 1966; 1970; 1974; 1978; 1982; 1986; 1990; 1994; 1998; 2002; 2006; 2010; 2014; 2018; 2022; 2026

The Philippines participated in the first ever Asian Games held in New Delhi, India, on 5 to 10 March 1951. With 5 golds, 6 silvers and 8 bronzes, this country was ranked 5th in the medal tally and 3rd place in the over-all medal count.

== Asian Games performance ==
The country's delegation of 39 athletes won its 19 medals in only four sports: swimming, basketball, athletics and weightlifting. There were no women athletes in the country's first Asian Games team.

== Medalists ==
=== Gold ===
No.	Medal	Name	Sport	Event
1	Gold	Andres Franco	Athletics	Men's High Jump
2	Gold	Francisco Calilan; Andres dela Cruz; Genaro Fernandez; Jose Gochango; Rafael Hechanova; Moro Lorenzo; Carlos Loyzaga; Antonio Martinez (c); Lauro Mumar; Ignacio Ramos; Meliton Santos; Mariano Tolentino; Coach: Dionisio Calvo	Basketball	Men's team
3	Gold	Artemio Salamat	Swimming	Men's 100m Backstroke
4	Gold	Jacinto Cayco	Swimming	Men's 200m Backstroke
5	Gold	Artemio Salamat; Jacinto Cayco; Nurhatab Rajab	Swimming	Men's 3x100m Medley Relay

=== Silver ===
No.	Medal	Name	Sport	Event
1	Silver	Rene Amabuyok	Swimming	Men's 200m Backstroke
2	Silver	Mohammed Mala	Swimming	Men's 400m Freestyle
3	Silver	Serafin Villanueva	Swimming	Men's 800m Freestyle
4	Silver	Mohammed Mala	Swimming	Men's 1500m Freestyle
5	Silver	Sotero Alcantara; Serafin Villanueva; Mohammed Mala; Nurhatab Rajab	Swimming	Men's 4x100m Freestyle
6	Silver	Rodrigo del Rosario	Weightlifting	Featherweight 60kg

=== Bronze ===
No.	Medal	Name	Sport	Event
1	Bronze	Genaro Cabrera; Tito Almagro; Jovencio Ardina; Bernabe Lovina	Athletics	Men's 4x100m Relay
2	Bronze	Bienvenido Llaneta; Bernabe Lovina; Tomas Bennet; Genaro Cabrera	Athletics	Men's 4x400m Relay
3	Bronze	Aurelio Amante	Athletics	Men's Discus Throw
4	Bronze	Sotero Alcantara	Swimming	Men's 100m Freestyle
5	Bronze	Mohammed Mala	Swimming	Men's 800m Freestyle
6	Bronze	Serafin Villanueva	Swimming	Men's 1500m Freestyle
7	Bronze	Edilberto Bonus	Swimming	Men's 100m Backstroke
8	Bronze	Pedro Landero	Weightlifting	Bantamweight 56kg

=== Multiple ===
Name	Sport	Gold	Silver	Bronze	Total
Artemio Salamat	Swimming	2	0	0	2
Jacinto Cayco	Swimming	2	0	0	2
Nurhatab Rajab	Swimming	1	1	0	2
Mohammed Mala	Swimming	0	3	1	4
Serafin Villanueva	Swimming	0	2	1	3
Sotero Alcantara	Swimming	0	1	1	2
Genaro Cabrera	Athletics	0	0	2	2
Bernabe Lovina	Athletics	0	0	2	2

== Medal summary ==
=== Medal by sports ===
Sport	Gold	Silver	Bronze	Total
Swimming	3	5	4	12
Athletics	1	0	3	4
Basketball	1	0	0	1
Weightlifting	0	1	1	2
Totals (4 entries)	5	6	8	19
