= India at the 2019 World Aquatics Championships =

- Flag of India
- FINA code: IND
- National federation: Swimming Federation of India
- Website: swimming.org.in

in Gwangju, South Korea
- Medals: Gold 0 Silver 0 Bronze 0 Total 0

World Aquatics Championships appearances
- 1973; 1975; 1978; 1982; 1986; 1991; 1994; 1998; 2001; 2003; 2005; 2007; 2009; 2011; 2013; 2015; 2017; 2019; 2022; 2023; 2024

India competed at the 2019 World Aquatics Championships in Gwangju, South Korea from 12 to 28 July.

== Diving ==
India entered one diver.

Men

Athlete	Event	Preliminaries		Semifinals		Final	
Athlete	Event	Points	Rank	Points	Rank	Points	Rank
Siddharth Pardeshi	10 m platform	319.60	33	Did not advance			

== Open water swimming ==
India qualified two male and two female open water swimmers.

Men

Athlete	Event	Time	Rank
Sushrut Kapse	Men's 10 km	2:03:25.9	68
Saurabh Sangvekar	Men's 10 km	DNS	

Women

Athlete	Event	Time	Rank
Hita Nayak	Women's 10 km	2:17:32.3	59
Nikitha Setru	Women's 10 km	2:20:09.5	61

== Swimming ==
India entered seven swimmers.

Men

Athlete	Event	Heat		Semifinal		Final	
Athlete	Event	Time	Rank	Time	Rank	Time	Rank
Page Advait	800 m freestyle	8:10.35	29	—		Did not advance	
Virdhawal Khade	50 m freestyle	22.95	50	Did not advance			
Virdhawal Khade	50 m butterfly	24.41	41	Did not advance			
Srihari Nataraj	50 m backstroke	25.83	34	Did not advance			
Srihari Nataraj	100 m backstroke	55.55	36	Did not advance			
Srihari Nataraj	200 m backstroke	2:02.08	32	Did not advance			
Aryan Nehra	1500 m freestyle	15:59.47	32	—		Did not advance	
Sajan Prakash	200 m freestyle	1:52.34	49	Did not advance			
Sajan Prakash	100 m butterfly	54.30	41	Did not advance			
Sajan Prakash	200 m butterfly	1:58.45	24	Did not advance			
Kushagra Rawat	400 m freestyle	3:59.39	37	—		Did not advance	
Likhith S P	50 m breaststroke	28.44	42	Did not advance			
Likhith S P	100 m breaststroke	1:02.90	52	Did not advance			
