= India at the 2022 World Aquatics Championships =

- Flag of India
- FINA code: IND
- National federation: Swimming Federation of India
- Website: swimming.org.in

in Budapest, Hungary
- Competitors: 9 in 3 sports
- Medals: Gold 0 Silver 0 Bronze 0 Total 0

World Aquatics Championships appearances
- 1973; 1975; 1978; 1982; 1986; 1991; 1994; 1998; 2001; 2003; 2005; 2007; 2009; 2011; 2013; 2015; 2017; 2019; 2022; 2023; 2024

India competed at the 2022 World Aquatics Championships in Budapest, Hungary from 17 June to 3 July.

== Diving ==
India entered one diver.

Men

Athlete	Event	Preliminaries		Semifinals		Final	
Athlete	Event	Points	Rank	Points	Rank	Points	Rank
Siddharth Pardeshi	10 m platform	281.95	36	did not advance			

== Open water swimming ==
India qualified two male and two female open water swimmers.

Men

Athlete	Event	Time	Rank
Army Pal	Men's 5 km	OTL	
Anurag Singh	Men's 10 km	2:03:16.4	45

Women

Athlete	Event	Time	Rank
Ashmitha Chandra	Women's 10 km	OTL	
Sindhu Moro	Women's 5 km	OTL	

== Swimming ==
India entered four swimmers.

Men

Athlete	Event	Heat		Semifinal		Final	
Athlete	Event	Time	Rank	Time	Rank	Time	Rank
Sajan Prakash	200 m freestyle	Withdrawn		did not advance			
Sajan Prakash	100 m butterfly	54.39	42	did not advance			
Sajan Prakash	200 m butterfly	1:58.67	25	did not advance			
Kushagra Rawat	400 m freestyle	3:59.69	33	—		did not advance	
Kushagra Rawat	800 m freestyle	8:15.96	23	—		did not advance	

Women

Athlete	Event	Heat		Semifinal		Final	
Athlete	Event	Time	Rank	Time	Rank	Time	Rank
Kenisha Gupta	50 m freestyle	26.72	40	did not advance			
Kenisha Gupta	100 m freestyle	57.99	32	did not advance			
Ridima Veerendrakumar	100 m backstroke	1:05.41	35	did not advance			
Ridima Veerendrakumar	200 m backstroke	2:35.78	22	did not advance			
