= Swimming at the 1951 Asian Games =

- Venue: National Stadium Swimming Pool
- Dates: 5–7 March 1951

Swimming was contested at the inaugural 1951 Asian Games in National Stadium Swimming Pool, New Delhi, India from March 5 to March 7, 1951 with eight events all for men.

Singapore was the most successful team in this event. Neo Chwee Kok of Singapore dominated the competition by winning four gold medals.

== Medalists ==
Event	Gold		Silver		Bronze	
100 m freestyle	Sachin Nag; India	1:04.7	Wiebe Wolters; Singapore	1:04.7	Sotero Alcantara; Philippines	1:04.8
400 m freestyle	Neo Chwee Kok; Singapore	5:13.8; GR	Mohammad Mala; Philippines	5:31.4	Bimal Chandra; India	5:32.5
800 m freestyle	Neo Chwee Kok; Singapore	11:02.2; GR	Serafin Villanueva; Philippines	11:25.5	Mohammad Mala; Philippines	11:30.7
1500 m freestyle	Neo Chwee Kok; Singapore	21:43.6; GR	Mohammad Mala; Philippines	22:17.5	Serafin Villanueva; Philippines	22:21.7
100 m backstroke	Artemio Salamat; Philippines	1:16.3; GR	Kanti Shah; India	1:17.0	Edilberto Bonus; Philippines	1:17.4
200 m breaststroke	Jacinto Cayco; Philippines	2:54.4; GR	Rene Amabuyok; Philippines	2:54.8	Jehangir Naegamwalla; India	3:11.0
4 × 100 m freestyle relay	Singapore; Wiebe Wolters; Lionel Chee; Barry Mitchell; Neo Chwee Kok	4:19.8; GR	Philippines; Nurhatab Rajab; Mohammad Mala; Serafin Villanueva; Sotero Alcantara	4:23.2	India; Isaac Mansoor; Bimal Chandra; Sambhu Saha; Sachin Nag	4:28.8
3 × 100 m medley relay	Philippines; Artemio Salamat; Jacinto Cayco; Nurhatab Rajab	3:36.5	Singapore; Lionel Chee; Tan Hwee Hock; Neo Chwee Kok	3:39.5	India; Kanti Shah; Jehangir Naegamwalla; Sachin Nag	3:43.6

== Medal table ==
Rank	Nation	Gold	Silver	Bronze	Total
1	Singapore (SIN)	4	2	0	6
2	Philippines (PHI)	3	5	4	12
3	India (IND)	1	1	4	6
Totals (3 entries)		8	8	8	24
