= Artistic swimming in India =

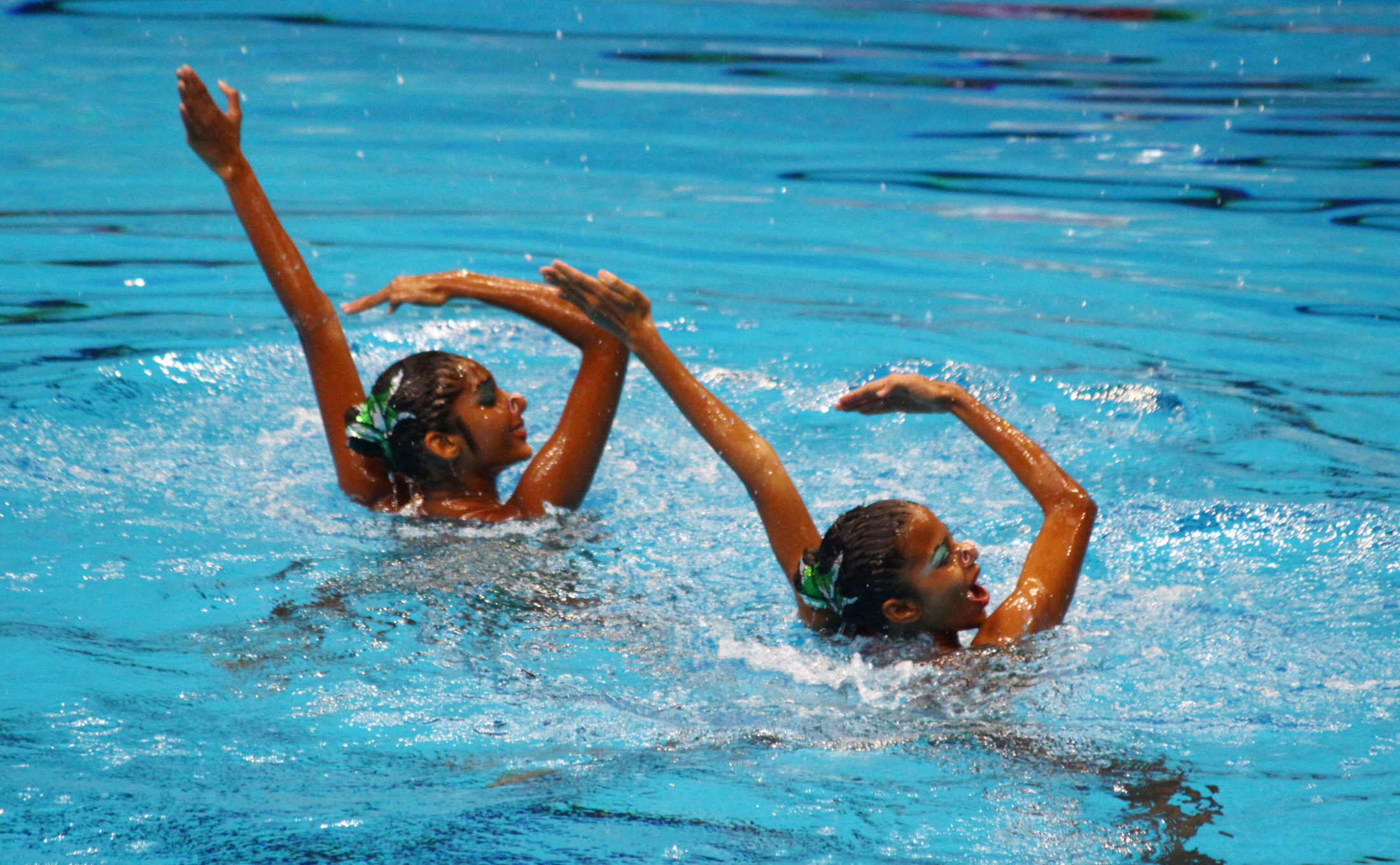
- Synchronised swimming at the 2010 Commonwealth Games in Delhi
- Country: India
- Governing body: Swimming Federation of India
- National team: [[India national Artistic swimming team|India]]

Artistic swimming, also known as synchronized swimming, is a sport that combines swimming, acrobatics, and dance. While still developing in India, artistic swimming has a growing presence with national governing bodies recognizing its potential.

== History ==
The exact origins of artistic swimming in India are unclear, but there have been sporadic appearances of the sport in recent decades. In the 2010 Commonwealth Games held in Delhi, a team of three Indian artistic swimmers, Avani Kardam Dave, Kavita Kolapkar, and Bijal Vasant, participated. Their participation marked a significant moment for the sport in India, despite facing challenges like lack of dedicated coaches.

== National Governing Body ==
The Swimming Federation of India (SFI) recognizes artistic swimming as a discipline under its purview. Their website includes a dedicated page for "Synchronized Swimming Events" which outlines eligibility and criteria for competitions.

== Challenges and Development ==
Artistic swimming in India faces developmental hurdles. Limited access to qualified coaches and training facilities can hinder the sport's growth. However, there are signs of progress. Private instructors offering lessons can be found in major cities.

Infrastructure: The lack of sufficient training facilities and pools dedicated to artistic swimming poses a significant challenge.

Funding: Limited financial support hampers the development and promotion of the sport.

Awareness and Popularity: Artistic swimming is less popular compared to other sports like cricket, resulting in fewer resources and media attention.

== Future Potential ==
With growing awareness and increased access to resources, artistic swimming in India has the potential to attract a wider audience. The dedication of individual athletes and coaches can pave the way for future national teams to compete at international events.

== See also ==
- Swimming in India
