= UAAP Season 40 men's basketball tournament =

1977 UAAP season
- Host school: Far Eastern University
Men's Finals	G1	Wins
Adamson Falcons	81	1
UP Fighting Maroons	79	0
- Duration: September 17, 1977
- Arena: Rizal Memorial Coliseum
- Winning coach: Moises Urbiztondo

The UAAP Season 40 men's basketball tournament was the University Athletic Association of the Philippines (UAAP) men's basketball tournament for the 1977–78 school year. The games began on July 10, 1977, with Far Eastern University serving as the tournament host.

The FEU Tamaraws were the defending champions after scoring a 10–0 sweep of the elimination rounds in 1976. The Adamson Falcons and the UP Fighting Maroons figured in this year's championship game, with the Falcons coming out with a two-point, 81–79 victory to claim their first UAAP title since joining the league in 1952.

== Tournament format ==
- Double round-robin eliminations, with the top two teams advancing to the Finals:

The team with the best win-loss record needs only to win once to clinch the championship;
The second-seeded team needs to beat the number one seed twice to win the championship.

== Teams ==
All six UAAP member schools fielded their respective teams in the men's tournament.

University	Team name	Coach
Adamson University	Falcons	Moises Urbiztondo Jr.
Far Eastern University	Tamaraws	Skip Agcaoili
National University	Bulldogs	Sonny Paguia
University of the East	Red Warriors	Pilo Pumaren
University of the Philippines Diliman	Fighting Maroons	Siegfried Guerrero
University of Santo Tomas	Glowing Goldies	Francis Wilson Sr.

== Elimination round ==
=== Team standings ===
Pos	Team	W	L	Pts	Qualification
1	Adamson Falcons	9	1	19	Twice-to-beat in the Finals
2	UP Fighting Maroons	8	2	18	Twice-to-win in the Finals
3	UST Glowing Goldies	7	3	17	
4	UE Red Warriors	4	6	14	
5	NU Bulldogs	2	8	12	
6	FEU Tamaraws (Note: FEU, which had originally finished first, had all of its 8 wins reversed by the UAAP into forfeit losses after several players played in ligang labas games.) (H)	0	10	0	

Source: The Varsitarian
Rules for classification: 1) match points; 2) if tied at second place, one-game playoff; 3) head-to-head record; 4) head-to-head point differential; 5) overall point differential
(H) Hosts
Notes:

FEU finished the elimination rounds on top of the six-team field with an 8–2 record. Their two losses were inflicted by only one team—the fifth-ranked UE Red Warriors, who with the exception of the winless NU Bulldogs were beaten by all the other teams. The UP Fighting Maroons and the Adamson Falcons were locked in a race for the second and last remaining Finals slot. The Falcons have finished the elimination rounds with a 7–3 record, while the Maroons still needed to win their last game against the UST Glowing Goldies to tie Adamson at second place in the standings and arrange a one-game playoff for the chance to meet the Tamaraws in the championship series. UP struggled against UST as they found themselves chasing a ten-point, 60–70 deficit in the final four minutes of the game. They went for a last-ditch run to chop the lead down to three, at 79–82, but another rally by the Goldies sealed their fate as they lost, 79–92. UP was relegated to third place with six wins and four losses, giving way to a best-of-three showdown between FEU and Adamson on September 17.

Just three days before the scheduled championship series, the UAAP made a surprsing announcement regarding FEU's disqualification from the tournament. The board had acted on a petition by the University of the Philippines to investigate the Tamaraws for fielding in ineligible players. Six of FEU's roster members were found to have participated in a side tournament while the UAAP tournament was ongoing, which was a violation of existing league rules. The decision to overturn all of the Tamaraws' wins into default losses meant that the vacated slot in the Finals has opened up for the Maroons to step in to contend for the championship against Adamson.

=== Match-up results ===
	Round 1					Round 2				
Team ╲ Game	1	2	3	4	5	6	7	8	9	10
Adamson	FEU school colors	NU school colors	UE school colors	UP school colors	UST school colors	FEU school colors	NU school colors	UE school colors	UP school colors	UST school colors
FEU	UST school colors	Adamson school colors	NU school colors	UE school colors	UP school colors	UST school colors	Adamson school colors	NU school colors	UE school colors	UP school colors
NU	UP school colors	UST school colors	Adamson school colors	FEU school colors	UE school colors	UP school colors	UST school colors	Adamson school colors	FEU school colors	UE school colors
UE	NU school colors	UP school colors	UST school colors	Adamson school colors	FEU school colors	NU school colors	UP school colors	UST school colors	Adamson school colors	FEU school colors
UP	UE school colors	NU school colors	FEU school colors	UST school colors	Adamson school colors	UE school colors	NU school colors	FEU school colors	UST school colors	Adamson school colors
UST	Adamson school colors	FEU school colors	NU school colors	UE school colors	UP school colors	Adamson school colors	FEU school colors	NU school colors	UE school colors	UP school colors

Source: The Varsitarian
= Win; = OT win; = Win by forfeit; = Loss; = OT loss; = Loss by forfeit

=== Scores ===
Results on top and to the right of the dashes are from first round games. Those to the bottom and to the left are second round games. Some scores not immediately sourced.

Teams	AdU	FEU	NU	UE	UP	UST
Adamson	—				96–95	92–89
FEU		—		69–71		95–83
NU			—			88–90
UE			114–89	—		92–94
UP	91–77				—	89–81
UST			88–85	76–75	92–79	—

Updated to match(es) played on 11 Sep 1977. Source: The Varsitarian
Legend: Blue = left column team win; Red = top row team win.
Matches with lighter background shading were decided after overtime.

== Finals ==
Top seed Adamson only has to win once, while the second-seeded UP needs to win twice to clinch the championship.

=== Elimination round head-to-head ===
UP won against Adamson, 91–77 in the first round and then the Falcons got back at them in the next round with a 96–95 victory. The two finalists are tied at one win apiece in their head-to-head match.

The Adamson Falcons had reached the Finals for only the first time since joining the UAAP in 1952, while the UP Fighting Maroons were gunning for their second championship since they took joint honors with the FEU Tamaraws and the UST Glowing Goldies back in 1939. Adamson held a twice-to-beat advantage over UP for having a better win-loss record.

=== Championship game result ===
September 17

Report

Adamson Soaring Falcons	81–79	UP Fighting Maroons
Scoring by half: 45–32, 36–47
Pts: Hector Calma 27		Pts: Francis Wilson Jr. 22
Adamson wins series in one game

Rizal Memorial Coliseum
Referees: C. Mercado, A. Ignacio

With a minute and-a-half left in the game, the Adamson Falcons have erected a nine-point, 81–72 cushion between them and their Finals opponent, the UP Fighting Maroons. The Maroons gassed themselves after a tiring stretch, where they rallied to bring down Adamson's 17-point, 45–62 lead. They were able to come within two points, at 61–63, but Hector Calma, the Falcons' 5-foot-8 point guard led his team with their own 11–2 run to bring the lead back up to eleven, at 74–63 with five minutes remaining. Adamson ended the half with a 13-point, 45–32 advantage, with their points coming from offensive putbacks and second-chance scoring. UP could not outrebound their opponents, even if they had the steadier offensive plays compared to the Falcons.

"UP could have easily won because they were outplaying Adamson in the first half, but they could not get any rebounds and that might be the reason why they lost."

— Francis Wilson Sr., UST head coach and father of UP's Francis Jr.

The Maroons kept pressing as they brought down the lead to ten, at 68–78 with the clock ticking to its final three minutes. The Falcons' last points were scored through free throws, with Calma making both attempts to put his team to an 81–72 lead. It was UP making the baskets from thereon, but they could only manage to come within two points, at 79–81 as time expired, yielding the win and the championship to Adamson. The 18 year-old Calma led all scorers with a game-high of 27 points. UP's Francis Wilson Jr. top scored for his team with 22 points.

Head coach Moises Urbiztondo, who received the championship trophy with team captain Louie Argana from UAAP president Ding Reyes earlier steered the Adamson Baby Falcons to win the championship of the Juniors division. They were able to sweep the eliminations after defeating the boys of National University, 133–104 and regain the crown that they lost against UE last year. The win scored a rare feat of securing a double championship for the Falcons.

== Award ==
UAAP Season 40 men's basketball champions
Adamson Falcons
First title

Preceded by Season 39 (1976)	UAAP basketball seasons Season 40 (1977)	Succeeded by Season 41 (1978)
