= Turo Valenzona =

Filipino professional basketball coach

Arturo "Turo" Valenzona
Personal information
- Born: November 5, 1942 (age 84)

Career information
- College: FEU
- Coaching career: 1972–2011, 2018

Career history

Playing
- 1970s: YCO Painters
- 1975: U/Tex Weavers

Coaching
- 1972–1991: FEU
- 1982–1984: Gilbey's Gin Kings
- 1985–1987: Tanduay Rhum Masters
- 1987–1988: Hills Bros. Coffee
- 1988: RFM-Swift Hotdogs
- 1989: Crispa 400
- 1990–1997: Diet Sarsi/Swift (assistant)
- 1992–96: San Sebastian
- 1997: Pop Cola 800s
- 2000–2005, 2011: San Sebastian
- 2018: Muntinlupa Cagers (consultant)

Career highlights
- As head coach: 3× PBA champion (1986 Reinforced, 1986 All-Filipino, 1987 Open); 8× UAAP men's champion (1972–1973, 1976, 1979, 1980–1981, 1983, 1991); 6× NCAA men's champion (1993–1996, 2001–2002); PBL champion (1988 International Invitational)

Arturo "Turo" F. Valenzona (born November 5, 1942), is a retired professional basketball player and coach.

Valenzona played college ball for the Far Eastern University before eventually playing in the Manila Industrial and Commercial Athletic Association and later in the Philippine Basketball Association with U/Tex.

== Coaching career ==
After his playing years, Valenzona coached the FEU Tamaraws to several championships in the UAAP and the Intercollegiate tournament. He gave Solidmills one interclub and one MICAA title, and led Apcor to six straight championships. He was also coach of the RP Youth team in 1978 and 1980. He assisted coach Nic Jorge during the 1978 Bangkok Asian Games. Valenzona was a low-key coach who made very smart decisions on the bench, particularly in clutch situations.

In the PBA, Valenzona became head coach of Gilbey's Gin at the start of the 1982 season, replacing Nemie Villegas, he led Gilbey's to three runner-up finishes from 1982-1984. The following year, the La Tondeña ballclub decided to replace him but he was soon back at the bench when Tanduay offered him a coaching job later that year, replacing Orly Castelo. In 1986, Valenzona had a memorable year, leading Tanduay Rhum Makers to their first PBA title and two straight championships. He added another title when the Rhum Makers went home with the Open Conference title in 1987.

He moved to the Hills Bros bench in the third conference of the 1987 PBA season and led the Coffee Kings to a runner-up finish. Aside from the PBA, he simultaneously coached a commercial ballclubs in the PABL, first with Golden Rice Cereals in late 1984, and later on with Hope Cigarettes, RFM-Swift's and the comebacking Crispa 400 in 1989.

Valenzona led the collegiate team San Sebastian College to four consecutive men's basketball championships in the NCAA from 1993-1996. He was the first president of the Basketball Coaches Association of the Philippines in the 1990s.

== Political career ==
Valenzona ran for councilor of Manila from the fifth district in 2016.

== Coaching record ==
=== Collegiate record ===
Season	Team	Elimination round					Playoffs				
Season	Team	GP	W	L	PCT	Finish	GP	W	L	PCT	Results
1972	FEU	10									Champions
1973	FEU	10									Champions
1974	FEU	10									
1975	FEU	10				2nd	1	0	1	,000	Finals
1976	FEU	10				1st	1	1	0	1.000	Champions
1977	FEU	10									
1978	FEU	12					—	—	—	—	Eliminated
1979	FEU	12				1st	1	1	0	1.000	Champions
1980	FEU	12	12	0	1.000	1st	No playoffs				Champions
1981	FEU	12	12	0	1.000	1st	1	1	0	1.000	Champions
1982	FEU	12									
1983	FEU	12									Champions
1984	FEU	12									
1985	FEU	12									
1986	FEU	14					—	—	—	—	Eliminated
1987	FEU	14	8	6	,571	4th	—	—	—	—	Eliminated
1988	FEU	14	5	9	.357	6th	—	—	—	—	Eliminated
1989	FEU	14	12	2	.857	1st	2	0	2	.000	Finals
1990	FEU	14	8	6	.571	5th	—	—	—	—	Eliminated
1991	FEU	14	11	3	.786	2nd	1	1	0	1.000	Champions
1993	SSC-R	10	8	2	.800	1st	No playoffs				Champions
1994	SSC-R	10	10	0	1.000	1st	No playoffs				Champions
1995	SSC-R	10	9	1	.900	1st	2	2	0	1.000	Champions
1996	SSC-R	12	10	2	.833	1st	2	2	0	1.000	Champions
2000	SSC-R	14	8	6	.571	4th	4	2	2	.500	Finals
2001	SSC-R	14	9	5	.643	2nd	5	3	2	.600	Champions
2002	SSC-R	14	11	3	.786	1st	3	3	0	.1000	Champions
2003	SSC-R	14	9	5	.643	2nd	4	2	2	.500	Finals
2004	SSC-R	14	7	7	.500	6th	—	—	—	—	Eliminated
2005	SSC-R	14	7	7	.500	4th	1	0	1	.000	Semifinals
1987–2005 totals		196	132	64	.673		24	15	9	.625	14 championships

Preceded by -	FEU Tamaraws head coach 1972-1991	Succeeded by Alfredo Amador
Preceded by Nemie Villegas	Gilbey's Gins head coach 1982-1984	Succeeded by Robert Jaworski
Preceded by Orly Castelo	Tanduay Rhum head coach 1985-1987	Succeeded by Ely Capacio
Preceded by Nat Canson	Hills Bros. Coffee head coach 1987-1988	Succeeded by Bogs Adornado
Preceded by -	Crispa 400 (PBL) head coach 1989	Succeeded by Atoy Co
Preceded by Francis Rodriguez	San Sebastian Stags men's basketball head coach 1992-1996	Succeeded by Bai Cristobal
Preceded by Derrick Pumaren	Pop Cola 800's head coach 1997	Succeeded by Norman Black
Preceded by Bai Cristobal	San Sebastian Stags men's basketball head coach 2000-2005	Succeeded by Raymond Valenzona
Preceded by Ato Agustin	San Sebastian Stags men's basketball head coach 2011	Succeeded by Topex Robinson
