= India at the 2023 World Aquatics Championships =

- Flag of India
- FINA code: IND
- National federation: Swimming Federation of India
- Website: swimming.org.in

in Fukuoka, japan
- Competitors: 10 (8 men and 2 women) in 3 sports
- Medals: Gold 0 Silver 0 Bronze 0 Total 0

World Aquatics Championships appearances
- 1973; 1975; 1978; 1982; 1986; 1991; 1994; 1998; 2001; 2003; 2005; 2007; 2009; 2011; 2013; 2015; 2017; 2019; 2022; 2023; 2024

India competed at the 2023 World Aquatics Championships in Fukuoka, Japan from 14 July to 30 July.

== Diving ==
India entered 1 diver.

Men

Athlete	Event	Preliminaries		Semifinals		Final	
Athlete	Event	Points	Rank	Points	Rank	Points	Rank
Heman London Singh	1 m springboard	235.65	56	—		did not advance	
Heman London Singh	3 m springboard	234.75	65	did not advance			

== Open water swimming ==
India entered 5 open water swimmers.

Men

Athlete	Event	Time	Rank
Prashans Hiremagalur	Men's 5 km	1:05:43.7	60
Army Pal	Men's 5 km	1:08:42.5	63
Anurag Singh	Men's 10 km	2:03:52.5	47

Women

Athlete	Event	Time	Rank
Bangalore Mahesh Rithika	Women's 5 km	1:12:23.2	54
Ashmitha Chandra	Women's 10 km	2:27:58.7	57

== Swimming ==
Swimming Federation of India has released the qualifying standards in 2022. Aryan Nehra achieved qualifying standards for Asian Games as well as B - qualifying standards for World Championships.

Men

Athlete	Event	Heat		Semifinal		Final	
Athlete	Event	Time	Rank	Time	Rank	Time	Rank
Kushagra Rawat	400 metre freestyle	3:59.03	35	—		did not advance	
Aryan Nehra	800 metre freestyle	8:00.76	27	—		did not advance	
Aryan Nehra	1500 metre freestyle	15:39.47	25	—		did not advance	
Srihari Nataraj	50 metre backstroke	25.51	28	did not advance			
Srihari Nataraj	100 metre backstroke	55.26	31	did not advance			
Srihari Nataraj	200 metre backstroke	2:04.42	31	did not advance			
Sajan Prakash	50 metre butterfly	24.93	57	did not advance			
Sajan Prakash	200 metre butterfly	1:58.07	23	did not advance			
