= India at the 2015 World Aquatics Championships =

- Flag of India
- World Aquatics code: IND
- National federation: Swimming Federation of India
- Website: www.swimmingfederation.in

in Kazan, Russia
- Competitors: 8 in 2 sports
- Medals: Gold 0 Silver 0 Bronze 0 Total 0

World Aquatics Championships appearances
- 1973; 1975; 1978; 1982; 1986; 1991; 1994; 1998; 2001; 2003; 2005; 2007; 2009; 2011; 2013; 2015; 2017; 2019; 2022; 2023; 2024; 2025

India competed at the 2015 World Aquatics Championships in Kazan, Russia from 24 July to 9 August 2015.

== Open water swimming ==
India has qualified two swimmers to compete in the open water marathon.

Athlete	Event	Time	Rank
Mandar Divase	Men's 10 km	2:16:50.2	69
Nikita Parch	Women's 10 km	DNF	

== Swimming ==
Indian swimmers have achieved qualifying standards in the following events (up to a maximum of 2 swimmers in each event at the A-standard entry time, and 1 at the B-standard):

Men

Athlete	Event	Heat		Semifinal		Final	
Athlete	Event	Time	Rank	Time	Rank	Time	Rank
Aaron D'Souza	100 m freestyle	51.41	66	did not advance			
Aaron D'Souza	200 m freestyle	1:52.00	56	did not advance			
Virdhawal Khade	50 m freestyle	23.01	38	did not advance			
Sajan Prakash	1500 m freestyle	15:45.29	35	—N/a		did not advance	
Sajan Prakash	200 m butterfly	2:01.63	31	did not advance			
Saurabh Sangvekar	400 m freestyle	4:02.57	60	—N/a		did not advance	
Sandeep Sejwal	50 m breaststroke	28.57	40	did not advance			
Sandeep Sejwal	100 m breaststroke	1:02.17	36	did not advance			
Sandeep Sejwal	200 m breaststroke	2:18.68	44	did not advance			
Aaron D'Souza; Virdhawal Khade; Saurabh Sangvekar; Sajan Prakash	4 × 100 m freestyle relay	3:28.96	30	—N/a		did not advance	

Women

Athlete	Event	Heat		Semifinal		Final	
Athlete	Event	Time	Rank	Time	Rank	Time	Rank
Shivani Kataria	50 m freestyle	27.65	67	did not advance			
Shivani Kataria	100 m freestyle	58.76	59	did not advance			
