= India at the 2017 World Aquatics Championships =

- Flag of India
- World Aquatics code: IND
- National federation: Swimming Federation of India
- Website: www.swimmingfederation.in

in Budapest, Hungary
- Competitors: 6 in 2 sports
- Medals: Gold 0 Silver 0 Bronze 0 Total 0

World Aquatics Championships appearances
- 1973; 1975; 1978; 1982; 1986; 1991; 1994; 1998; 2001; 2003; 2005; 2007; 2009; 2011; 2013; 2015; 2017; 2019; 2022; 2023; 2024; 2025

India competed at the 2017 World Aquatics Championships in Budapest, Hungary from 14 July to 30 July.

== Open water swimming ==
India entered two open water swimmers

Athlete	Event	Time	Rank
Omkumar Tokalkandiga	Men's 10 km	2:13:52.1	64
Nikitha Setru	Women's 10 km	2:28:14.6	58

== Swimming ==
India received a Universality invitation from FINA to send a maximum of four swimmers (two men and two women) to the World Championships.

Athlete	Event	Heat		Semifinal		Final	
Athlete	Event	Time	Rank	Time	Rank	Time	Rank
Sajan Prakash	Men's 100 m butterfly	54.46	48	Did not advance			
Sajan Prakash	Men's 200 m butterfly	2:00.57	30	Did not advance			
Madhu Prathapan	Men's 50 m backstroke	27.17	43	Did not advance			
Madhu Prathapan	Men's 100 m backstroke	58.49	39	Did not advance			
Sayani Ghosh	Women's 200 m individual medley	2:32.55	35	Did not advance			
Sayani Ghosh	Women's 400 m individual medley	DNS		—N/a		Did not advance	
Damini Gowda	Women's 100 m butterfly	1:06.19	40	Did not advance			
Damini Gowda	Women's 200 m butterfly	2:28.95	33	Did not advance			
