= Roehl Nadurata =

Filipino deceased basketball coach and player

Personal information
- Born: November 2, 1937
- Died: October 9, 2012 (aged 74)

Career information
- College: UE
- Number: 13

Career history

Playing
- Puyat Steel
- Crispa Redmanizers
- U/Tex Weavers
- Ysmael Steel Admirals

Coaching
- 1979–1980; 1987–1990: UE
- 1991–1994: Sarsi Sizzlers (assistant)
- 1994–1996: Mobiline Phone Pals (assistant)
- 2000–2008: Red Bull Barako (assistant)
- 2009–2011: Air21 Express (assistant)
- 2011–2012: Rain or Shine Elasto Painters (assistant)

Career highlights
- As player: 2x UAAP champion (1958, 1960); UAAP Most Valuable Player (1960); MICAA Champion (1965); As assistant coach: 6× PBA champion (1992 Third Conference, 1993 Commissioner's, 2001 Commissioner's, 2002 Commissioner's, 2006 Fiesta, 2012 Governors'); PBL champion (1989 Freedom Cup)
Medals
Men's basketball
Representing Philippines
ABC Championship
Silver medal – second place	1965 Kuala Lumpur	Team
Asian Games
Gold medal – first place	1962 Jakarta	Team
Assistant coach for Philippines
SEA Games
Gold medal – first place	1991 Manila	Team

Roehl Nadurata (November 2, 1937 – October 9, 2012) is a Filipino former basketball player and coach.

== Playing career ==
In college, he played for the University of the East (UE) Red Warriors. Nadurata became the inaugural University Athletic Association of the Philippines (UAAP) men's basketball Most Valuable Player in 1960.

Upon leaving UE, played for several teams in the Manila Industrial and Commercial Athletic Association (MICAA) such as Puyat Steel, Crispa Redmanizers, U/Tex Weavers, and Ysmael Steel.

He also played for national team in 1962 Jakarta Asian Games, when they won gold, and in 1968 Olympics.

== Coaching career ==
Nadurata coached the UE Red Warriors twice, from 1979 to 1980, and from 1987 until 1990 where led them into a Finals loss against Ateneo in 1987, and a finals loss against La Salle in 1990.

Nadurata was known to be the leading assistant of Yeng Guiao. Their partnership won 7 championships in different teams.

== Personal life ==
Nadurata ran as a councilor in Caloocan, but lost. Nadurata died on October 9, 2012.

== Coaching record ==
Season	Finish	GP	W	L	Pts	GP	W	L	Results
UE Red Warriors (UAAP)
1979									Eliminated
1980									No playoffs (Note: FEU won all elimination round games. Based on the rules at that time, they were then named automatic champions, and other teams were ranked by elimination round finish.)
1987	2nd/8	14	10	4	24	1	0	1	Lost Finals
1988	5th/8	14	6	8	20	—	—	—	Eliminated
1989	3rd/8	14	9	5	23	—	—	—	Eliminated
1990	2nd/8	14	9	5	23	3	2	1	Lost Finals
