= Kanti Shah (swimmer) =

Indian swimmer and water polo player

Personal information
- Full name: Khamlillal Shah
- Born: 13 October 1920
- Died: May 1989 Mumbai, Maharashtra, India

Sport
- Sport: Swimming
- Strokes: Backstroke
Medal record
Men's swimming
Representing India
Asian Games
Silver medal – second place	1951 New Delhi	100 m backstroke
Bronze medal – third place	1951 New Delhi	3×100 m medley relay
Men's water polo
Representing India
Asian Games
Gold medal – first place	1951 New Delhi	Team

Khamlillal "Kanti" Shah (13 October 1920 – May 1989) was an Indian swimmer and water polo player. He was India's first ever Asian Games medalist, with a silver medal in the men's 100 m backstroke at the 1951 Asian Games.

He won three medals at the 1951 Asian Games, a silver in the men's 100 m backstroke, a bronze in the men's 3 x 100 m medley relay, and was part of the gold-winning Indian water polo team.

He also competed in the men's 100 m backstroke at the 1948 Summer Olympics and the 1952 Summer Olympics and the water polo tournament at the 1952 Summer Olympics.
