= Singapore at the 1951 Asian Games =

- IOC code: SIN
- NOC: Singapore National Olympic Council
- Website: www.singaporeolympics.com (in English)

in New Delhi
- Flag bearer: Lloyd Valberg
- Medals Ranked 4th: Gold 5 Silver 7 Bronze 2 Total 14

Asian Games appearances (overview)
- 1951; 1954; 1958; 1962; 1966; 1970; 1974; 1978; 1982; 1986; 1990; 1994; 1998; 2002; 2006; 2010; 2014; 2018; 2022; 2026

Singapore participated in the 1951 Asian Games, which was held in the capital city of New Delhi, India from 4 March 1951 to 11 March 1951. Singapore sent 20 athletes to the Games and ranked 4th in the first edition of the Asiad.

== Competitors ==
Singapore sent 20 athletes.

== Medalists ==
The following Singapore competitors won medals at the Games.

Medal	Name	Sport	Event	Date
Gold	Neo Chwee Kok	Swimming	400 m freestyle	
Gold	Neo Chwee Kok	Swimming	800 m freestyle	
Gold	Neo Chwee Kok	Swimming	1,500 m freestyle	
Gold	Neo Chwee Kok; Lionel Chee; Barry Mitchell; Wiebe Wolters	Swimming	4x100 m freestyle	
Gold	Ng Liang Chiang	Athletics	110 m hurdles	10 March
Silver	Peter Ho	Weightlifting	Lightweight (67.5 kg)	
Silver	Cheong Kok Cheong	Weightlifting	Light heavyweight (82.5 kg)	
Silver	Wiebe Wolters	Swimming	100 m freestyle	
Silver	Neo Chwee Kok; Lionel Chee; Tan Hwee Hock	Swimming	3x100 m medley	
Silver	Lionel Chee; Ho Kian Bin; Kee Soon Bee; Barry Mitchell; Keith Mitchell; Sim Boon Hoon; Tan Hwee Hock; Tan Wee Eng; Wiebe Wolters	Water Polo		11 March
Silver	Laurie Dowdeswell	Athletics	80 m hurdles	
Silver	Laurie Dowdeswell	Athletics	200 m	
Bronze	Lloyd Valberg	Athletics	110 m hurdles	10 March
Bronze	Ng Liang Chiang	Athletics	400 m hurdles	10 March

== Athletics ==
Men

Athlete	Event	Heats		Final	
Athlete	Event	Time	Rank	Time	Rank
Ng Liang Chiang	110 m hurdles			15.2	1st place, gold medalist(s)
Lloyd Valberg	110 m hurdles			15.7	3rd place, bronze medalist(s)
Ng Liang Chiang	400 m hurdles			57.6	3rd place, bronze medalist(s)

Women

Athlete	Event	Heats		Final	
Athlete	Event	Time	Rank	Time	Rank
Laurie Dowdeswell	80 m hurdles			13.2	2nd place, silver medalist(s)
Laurie Dowdeswell	200 m			27.2	2nd place, silver medalist(s)

== Swimming ==
Men

Athlete	Event	Heats		Final	
Athlete	Event	Time	Rank	Time	Rank
Neo Chwee Kok	400 m freestyle			5:13.8	1st place, gold medalist(s)
Neo Chwee Kok	800 m freestyle			11:02.2	1st place, gold medalist(s)
Neo Chwee Kok	1,500 m freestyle			21:43.6	1st place, gold medalist(s)
Neo Chwee Kok; Lionel Chee; Barry Mitchell; Wiebe Wolters	4x100 m freestyle			4:19.8	1st place, gold medalist(s)
Wiebe Wolters	100 m freestyle			1:04.7	2nd place, silver medalist(s)
Neo Chwee Kok; Lionel Chee; Tan Hwee Hock	3x100 m medley			3:39.5	2nd place, silver medalist(s)

== Water polo ==
Summary

Key:

- FT – After full time.
- P – Match decided by penalty-shootout.

Team	Event	Final / BM / Pl.	
Team	Event	Opposition Score	Rank
Singapore men's	Men's tournament	6 – 4	2nd place, silver medalist(s)
