= UAAP Season 54 men's basketball tournament =

Basketball competition in the Philippines

1991 UAAP season
- Host school: University of the Philippines
Men's Finals	G1	G1(R)	Wins
~~De La Salle Green Archers~~	~~80~~	0	0+1
FEU Tamaraws	~~77~~	20	1
- Duration: October 5–12, 1991
- Arena(s): Araneta Coliseum
- Winning coach: Turo Valenzona (8th title)
- TV network(s): Silverstar Sports (New Vision 9)

The 1991 UAAP men's basketball tournament was the 54th year of the men's tournament of the University Athletic Association of the Philippines (UAAP)'s basketball championship. Hosted by University of the Philippines. The season opens on July 20 at the Araneta Coliseum. The year's theme "Ang UAAP sa Siglo 2000: Palaro'y Paunlarin, Pagkatao'y Pagtibayin" signifies the UAAP's efforts at strengthening the values of healthy competition, friendship and sportsmanship in the pursuit of physical excellence.

Far Eastern University won their first title since 1983 and 12th overall on October 12 when De La Salle University did not show up in the ordered replay of their entire championship match from the first to fourth quarter, despite La Salle winning the only contested game by three points. The UAAP Board order happened right after the celebration of winning the championship game. The UAAP Board had a lone dissenter against the cries of FEU, Fr. Raymond Holscher, S.J. of the Ateneo de Manila University, another Catholic university like La Salle.

== Elimination round ==
Tournament format:

- Double round robin; the two teams with the best records advance Finals:
  - The #1 seed will only need to win once to clinch the championship.
  - The #2 seed has to win twice to clinch the championship.

Team	W	L	Pts.
La Salle Green Archers	12	2	
FEU Tamaraws	11	3	
UST Glowing Goldies	11	3	
**UP Fighting Maroons**			
Ateneo Blue Eagles	6	8	
Adamson Falcons			
UE Red Warriors	2	12	
NU Bulldogs	1	13	

Season host is boldfaced.
Standings a bit unclear if FEU and UST finished with 11-3 or 10-4.

Qualified to the Finals with the twice to beat advantage
Qualified to the Finals

First round standings: La Salle and FEU (6-1), UST (5-2), UP (4-3), Ateneo and Adamson (3-4), UE (1-6) and NU (0-7).

On September 28 at the Loyola Gym, La Salle and FEU, both tied at first place with 10 wins and two losses, played in a crucial match for the first finals berth and a twice-to-beat advantage in the championship. De La Salle Green Archers prevailed over the FEU Tamaraws, 80-75, and avenged their only loss in the first round to the Tamaraws, 80-82, last August 3.

Far Eastern University Tamaraws sealed a repeat of the 1989 varsity championship with De La Salle by defeating University of Santo Tomas Glowing Goldies, 95-89, in a playoff on October 2.

== Finals ==
=== Game 1 ===
October 5

De La Salle Green Archers	~~80~~–~~77~~	FEU Tamaraws
Result overturned; Game 1 ordered replayed

Araneta Coliseum, Quezon City

The Green Archers came out on top, registering an 80-77 victory over FEU. There was a technical error committed by the officials working the game. The error in question came in the last 2:26 of the game and La Salle ahead. The table officials failed to notify the referees of the game that La Sallian Tonyboy Espinosa had already his fifth final foul against the driving Johnny Abarrientos.

Espinosa was still able to play for a few seconds more before FEU coach Arturo Valenzona and team manager Anton Montinola were able to approach the table officials to point out the mistake. The game was delayed for about five minutes. When play resumed, UAAP commissioner Boy Codiñera and his officials failed to slap the necessary technical foul on De La Salle.

The Green Archers went on to win the game. But when FEU team captain Victor Pablo signed the official scoreboard, he placed the game under protest. The UAAP board deferred the traditional post-game award. They wanted to wait until a decision on FEU's protest could be reached.

Two days of apprehension, protest, and Tuesday's marathon hearings, UAAP officials ordered a replay of the championship match.

=== Game 1 replay ===
October 12

De La Salle Green Archers	0–20	FEU Tamaraws
FEU wins Game 1 by forfeit
FEU wins series by forfeit

Araneta Coliseum, Quezon City

The Green Archers of De La Salle University never showed up for the UAAP championship replay on October 12. As a result, the UAAP board declared on that Saturday the FEU Tamaraws as the 1991 UAAP champions.

== See also ==
- NCAA Season 67 basketball tournaments

Preceded by Season 53 (1990)	UAAP basketball seasons Season 54 (1991) basketball	Succeeded by Season 55 (1992)
