= Water polo in India =

- Country: India
- Governing body: Swimming Federation of India
- National team(s): Men; Women

International competitions
- List: Asian Games: Champions 1951; Runners-up 1970; 3rd place 1982; Women's: 4th place 2010

Water polo in India is administered by the Swimming Federation of India. India's best performance was gold medal at the 1951 Asian Games. The India men's national water polo team also won a silver medal at the 1970 Asian Games, losing to Japan 4 goals to 3 in the finals. The next time India won a medal was a bronze at the 1982 Asian Games.

== National teams ==
- India men's national water polo team
- India women's national water polo team

== India men's team at the Olympics ==
India has participated twice at the Olympics.

Year	Rank	Venue	Eliminating rounds	Round One Results	Round Two Results
1948	12th	London, United Kingdom	-	India 1–12 Netherlands; India 7–4 Chile	India 1–12 Netherlands; India 1–11 Spain
1952	21st	Helsinki, Finland	India 1–16 Italy; India 0–12 Soviet Union	-	-

== India men's team at the Asian Games ==
India has participated 5 times at the Asian Games.

Year	Rank	Venue
1951	1st place, gold medalist(s)	New Delhi, India
1970	2nd place, silver medalist(s)	Bangkok, Thailand
1974	6th	Tehran, Iran
1982	3rd place, bronze medalist(s)	New Delhi, India
1986	6th	Seoul, South Korea

== India women's team at the Asian Games ==
Year	Rank	Venue
2010	4th	Guangzhou, China
