= India women's national water polo team =

National sports team

India
- FINA code: IND
- Association: Swimming Federation of India
- Confederation: AASF (Asia)

Asian Games
- Appearances: 1 (first in 2010)
- Best result: 4th

Asian Championships
- Best result: 5th place (2012)

The India women's national water polo team represents India in international women's water polo. Water Polo in India is governed by the Swimming Federation of India (SFI). India's Women's team made their debut at the 2010 Asian Games where they finished fourth. They participated in their first Asian Championships in 2012 where they finished fifth.

== Results ==
=== Asian Games ===
- 2010 (China) – 4th place

=== Asian Championships ===
- (United Arab Emirates) 2012 – 5th place
- (India) 2025 – 8th place
