= India at the 2024 World Aquatics Championships =

- Flag of India
- FINA code: IND
- National federation: Swimming Federation of India
- Website: swimming.org.in

in Doha, Qatar
- Competitors: 14 in 3 sports
- Medals: Gold 0 Silver 0 Bronze 0 Total 0

World Aquatics Championships appearances
- 1973; 1975; 1978; 1982; 1986; 1991; 1994; 1998; 2001; 2003; 2005; 2007; 2009; 2011; 2013; 2015; 2017; 2019; 2022; 2023; 2024

India competed at the 2024 World Aquatics Championships in Doha, Qatar from 2 to 18 February.

== Competitors ==
The following is the list of competitors in the Championships.

Sport	Men	Women	Total
Diving	3	1	4
Open water swimming	3	3	6
Swimming	2	2	4
Total	8	6	14

== Diving ==
Men

Athlete	Event	Preliminaries		Semifinals		Final	
Athlete	Event	Points	Rank	Points	Rank	Points	Rank
Hemam London Singh	1 m springboard	197.05	39	—		Did not advance	
Hemam London Singh	3 m springboard	238.80	62	Did not advance			
Surajit Rajbanshi	1 m springboard	192.20	40	—		Did not advance	
Surajit Rajbanshi	3 m springboard	231.90	64	Did not advance			
Ningthoujam Wilson Singh	10 m platform	254.85	41	Did not advance			

Women

Athlete	Event	Preliminaries		Semifinals		Final	
Athlete	Event	Points	Rank	Points	Rank	Points	Rank
Palak Sharma	1 m springboard	117.65	47	—		Did not advance	
Palak Sharma	3 m springboard	127.25	52	Did not advance			
Palak Sharma	10 m platform	137.60	45	Did not advance			

== Open water swimming ==
Men

Athlete	Event	Time	Rank
Prashans Manjunath Hiremagalur	Men's 5 km	57:43.8	65
Army Pal	Men's 5 km	1:01:26.1	71
Anurag Singh	Men's 10 km	2:01:42.0	66

Women

Athlete	Event	Time	Rank
Bangalore Mahesh Rithika	Women's 5 km	1:08:47.2	54
Ashmitha Chandra	Women's 10 km	2:21:11.8	64
Mahalakshmi Porur Kalan Rajagopal Ravi	Women's 10 km	OTL	

== Swimming ==
India entered 4 swimmers.

Men

Athlete	Event	Heat		Semifinal		Final	
Athlete	Event	Time	Rank	Time	Rank	Time	Rank
Tanish Mathew	100 metre freestyle	50.58	39	Did not advance			
Tanish Mathew	200 metre freestyle	1:51.68	39	Did not advance			
Likhith Selvaraj	50 metre breaststroke	28.38	28	Did not advance			
Likhith Selvaraj	100 metre breaststroke	1:02.96	41	Did not advance			

Women

Athlete	Event	Heat		Semifinal		Final	
Athlete	Event	Time	Rank	Time	Rank	Time	Rank
Suvana Chetana	50 metre backstroke	30.23	38	Did not advance			
Suvana Chetana	100 metre backstroke	1:05.26	39	Did not advance			
Dhinidhi Desinghu	100 metre freestyle	59.41	41	Did not advance			
Dhinidhi Desinghu	200 metre freestyle	2:10.41	40	Did not advance			

Mixed

Athlete	Event	Heat		Semifinal		Final	
Athlete	Event	Time	Rank	Time	Rank	Time	Rank
Tanish Mathew; Suvana Chetana; Dhinidhi Desinghu; Likhith Selvaraj	4 × 100 m medley relay	4:05.10	21	—		Did not advance	
