= India at the 2013 World Aquatics Championships =

- Flag of India
- FINA code: IND
- National federation: Swimming Federation of India
- Website: www.swimmingfederation.in

in Barcelona, Spain
- Competitors: 5 in 2 sports
- Medals: Gold 0 Silver 0 Bronze 0 Total 0

World Aquatics Championships appearances
- 1973; 1975; 1978; 1982; 1986; 1991; 1994; 1998; 2001; 2003; 2005; 2007; 2009; 2011; 2013; 2015; 2017; 2019; 2022; 2023; 2024

India is competing at the 2013 World Aquatics Championships in Barcelona, Spain between 19 July and 4 August 2013.

== Open water swimming ==
India qualified two quota places for the following events in open water swimming.

| Athlete | Event | Time | Rank |
|---|---|---|---|
| Mandar Anandrao Divase | Men's 10 km | DNF | |
| Poorva Kiran Shetye | Women's 10 km | OTL | |

== Swimming ==
Indian swimmers earned qualifying standards in the following events (up to a maximum of 2 swimmers in each event at the A-standard entry time, and 1 at the B-standard):

Men

| Athlete | Event | Heat | | Semifinal | | Final | |
| Athlete | Event | Time | Rank | Time | Rank | Time | Rank |
|---|---|---|---|---|---|---|---|
| Virdhawal Khade | 50 m freestyle | 24.07 | 57 | Did not advance | | | |
| Virdhawal Khade | 100 m freestyle | 53.47 | 62 | Did not advance | | | |
| Sandeep Sejwal | 50 m breaststroke | 28.12 | 35 | Did not advance | | | |
| Sandeep Sejwal | 100 m breaststroke | 1:02.49 | 44 | Did not advance | | | |
| Sandeep Sejwal | 200 m breaststroke | 2:16.05 | 32 | Did not advance | | | |

Women

| Athlete | Event | Heat | | Semifinal | | Final | |
| Athlete | Event | Time | Rank | Time | Rank | Time | Rank |
|---|---|---|---|---|---|---|---|
| Pooja Alva | 100 m butterfly | 1:05.70 | 44 | Did not advance | | | |
| Pooja Alva | 200 m butterfly | 2:31.76 | 25 | Did not advance | | | |
