= UAAP Season 39 men's basketball tournament =

Basketball competition in the Philippines

1976 UAAP season
- Host school: University of Santo Tomas
Men's Finals	G1	Wins
FEU Tamaraws	91	1
UE Red Warriors	82	0
- Duration: October 1976
- Arena(s): Rizal Memorial Coliseum
- Winning coach: Arturo Valenzona

The 1976 UAAP men's basketball tournament was the 39th year of the men's tournament of the University Athletic Association of the Philippines (UAAP)'s basketball championship. Hosted by University of Santo Tomas, the FEU Tamaraws defeated the back-to-back defending champions UE Warriors in the finals taking their ninth overall UAAP men's basketball championship.

== Finals ==
The score was 55–69 with ten minutes remaining in the second half.

There was that encounter under the goal when Marte Saldana of FEU and Jaime Manansala of UE practically embraced each other trying to get ahead in reaching for the ball. Later, Ramon Cruz of UE intercepted Anthony Dasalla's pass to a teammate and he scored for two. The score was 61–76, with FEU still ahead. Then Rico Acuna unstoppable, did a running lay-up and UE scored 63. Until Valencia got a foul and made the couple of shots from the foul line.

With three minutes remaining in the second half, Alex Tan of UE and Marte Saldana jumped for the ball and soon, American Michael Manyak upped UE's score to 76 with FEU still ahead by 10 points. With one minute forty seconds, Saldana was fouled by a UE player. He went to the top of the keyhole, made ready to shoot. Saldana made one out of two. Again, Manyak shot and brought the score to 78 for UE. At this juncture, it was a frenetic, seemingly no-holds-barred game since clock was fast ticking and end was nearing. Full-court press were evident.

Then Valencia of FEU, seemingly irritated by Cruz of UE, was on the verge of throwing a punch when the referee spotted him and caught him in the act. With Valencia thrown out of the game, the Tamaraws lost someone vitally needed at the game's closing. With the score 78–87, and with only a minute left and 20 seconds, the contest took on additional fury.

It was then the not-so-tall Danilo Manalastas was sent in by FEU and he was unstoppable. When the final score was chalked, 82–91, the sudden deafening eruption of jubilation from the crowd was a fitting climax to FEU's ending the two-year reign of the Warriors and garnering the elusive title for the third time in the last five years.

Preceded by Season 38 (1975)	UAAP basketball seasons Season 39 (1976) basketball	Succeeded by Season 40 (1977)
