= Lloyd Valberg =

Singaporean high jumper (1922–1997)

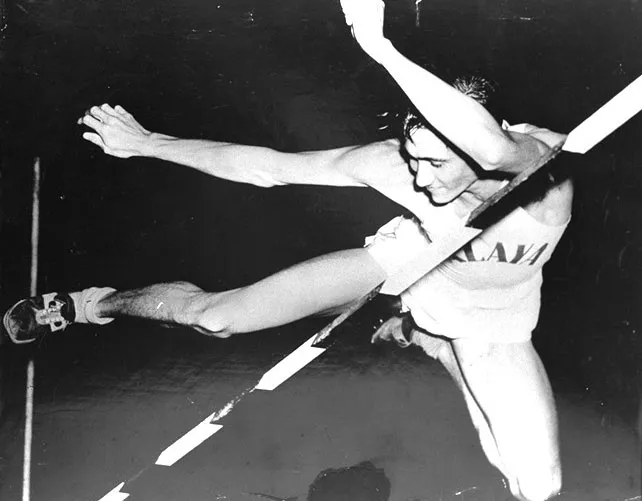
- Valberg at the 1948 Summer Olympics

Personal information
- Full name: Lloyd Oscar Valberg
- Nationality: Singaporean
- Born: 14 April 1922 Singapore, Straits Settlements (present-day Singapore)
- Died: 26 March 1997 (aged 74) Perth, Australia

Sport
- Country: Singapore
- Sport: Athletics
- Events: High jump; hurdles; triple jump

Lloyd Oscar Valberg (14 April 1922 – 26 March 1997) was a Singaporean high jumper who became the first Singaporean to compete at the Olympic Games after he participated in the 1948 Summer Olympics that were held in London, United Kingdom.

== Early years ==
Valberg was born in Singapore under British rule on 14 April 1922. He took up the high jump when he was 17, and in 1947 he broke the Singapore record with a jump of 1.87m.

== Career ==
Valberg served in the Singapore Fire Brigade from 1937 to the end of World War II and then at Port Authority where he became the Chief Fire Officer until 1972.

=== Athletics career ===
Valberg qualified for the high jump final at the 1948 Summer Olympics where he finished 14th.

Valberg finished seventh in the 1950 British Empire Games 120 yards hurdles and eleventh in the high jump. He finished third in the 110 metres hurdles at the 1951 Asian Games, while representing Singapore, and was also the country's flag bearer.

In 2025, Valberg's athletic journey was honoured in Singapore's National Day Parade, in celebration of the nation's 60th year of independence.

== Personal life ==
Valberg was a grand-uncle to Singapore's first Olympic gold medalist, Joseph Schooling, in the 100m Butterfly in the 2016 Summer Olympics. It was Lloyd who inspired Schooling to compete in the Olympics.

Valberg died in Perth, Australia, in 1997. He was 74.
