= Pedro Cayco =

Filipino swimmer

Personal information
- Born: May 10, 1932 (age 94)

Sport
- Sport: Swimming

Pedro S. Cayco (born 10 May 1932) is a retired swimmer who competed at the 1956 Summer Olympics at the Men's 100 metre backstroke event. His older brother Jacinto was also an Olympic swimmer.
