= Water polo at the 1951 Asian Games =

- Venue: National Stadium Swimming Pool
- Dates: 11 March 1951
- Competitors: 16 from 2 nations

Water polo was played at the 1951 Asian Games in New Delhi on 11 March 1951. Two nations entered the water polo event - India and Singapore.

The host nation India won the gold medal after beating Singapore 6–4.

== Medalists ==
| Event | Gold | Silver | Bronze |
|---|---|---|---|
| Men | India; Jahan Ahir; Ganesh Das; D. Daver; R. Dean; Isaac Mansoor; G. Rattansey; Kanti Shah | Singapore; Lionel Chee; Ho Kian Bin; Kee Soon Bee; Barry Mitchell; Keith Mitchell; Sim Boon Hoon; Tan Hwee Hock; Tan Wee Eng; Wiebe Wolters | None awarded |

== Squads ==
Squads

| India | Singapore |
|---|---|
| Jahan Ahir; Ganesh Das; D. Daver; R. Dean; Isaac Mansoor; G. Rattansey; Kanti Shah | Lionel Chee; Ho Kian Bin; Kee Soon Bee; Barry Mitchell; Keith Mitchell; Sim Boon Hoon; Tan Hwee Hock; Tan Wee Eng; Wiebe Wolters |

== Results ==
| 11 March | India | 6–4 | Singapore | National Stadium Swimming Pool, New Delhi |
| 11 March | Scoring by half: 2–3, 4–1 | | | National Stadium Swimming Pool, New Delhi |
| 11 March | Shah, Dean 2 | Goals | Sim 2 | National Stadium Swimming Pool, New Delhi |

== Final standing ==
| Rank | Team | Pld | W | D | L |
|---|---|---|---|---|---|
| 1st place, gold medalist(s) | India | 1 | 1 | 0 | 0 |
| 2nd place, silver medalist(s) | Singapore | 1 | 0 | 0 | 1 |
