= Diving in India =

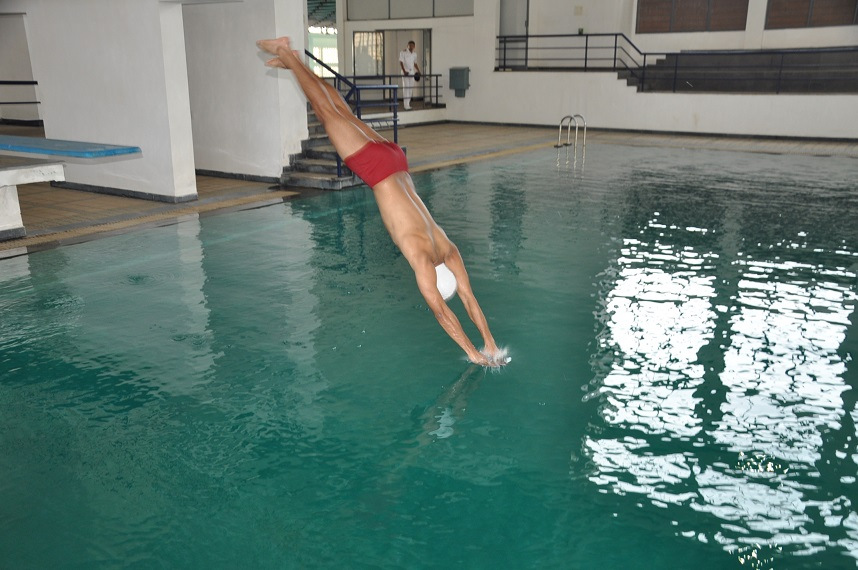
- Cadet diving into a swimming pool at the Indian Naval Academy
- Country: India
- Governing body: Swimming Federation of India
- National team(s): [[India national Diving team|India]]

Diving is a minor sport in India. Diving in India is administered by the Swimming Federation of India.

Two Arjuna awardees, Bajrangi Prasad (1961) and Manjari Bhargava (1974) together with the Swimming Federation of India and the Army Sports Institute are working to uplift the sport in India. Gymnast-turned-diver Medali Redkar won gold in the 1m spring board contest at the National Games in Rajkot in October 2022.

== Army Sports Institute ==
The Army Sports Institute in Pune has taken the initiative to develop young athletes into divers. India's current international divers, Hemam London Singh and Siddharth Pardeshi are both proteges of the ASI.

== Asian Games ==
India has won five medals in the event since its inception including two gold, one silver and two bronze, making it the third most successful nation behind Japan and China.

Two Indian athletes, Siddharth Bajrang Pardeshi and Hemam London Singh, competed in four events at the Asian Games in Hangzhou in 2023, but did not win any medals. Hemam London Singh is from Manipur, while Siddharth Pardeshi is from Maharashtra.
