= List of flag bearers for Singapore at the Olympics =

Singapore at the Olympics
- IOC code: SGP
- NOC: Singapore National Olympic Council
- Website: www.singaporeolympics.com
- Medals: Gold 1 Silver 2 Bronze 3 Total 6

Summer appearances
- 1948; 1952; 1956; 1960; 1964; 1968; 1972; 1976; 1980; 1984; 1988; 1992; 1996; 2000; 2004; 2008; 2012; 2016; 2020; 2024

Winter appearances
- 2018; 2022; 2026

Other related appearances
- Malaysia (1964)

This is a list of flag bearers who have represented Singapore at the Olympics.

Flag bearers carry the national flag of their country at the opening ceremony of the Olympic Games.

#	Event year	Season	Flag bearer	Sport
1	1948	Summer	Jocelyn de Souza	Official
2	1952	Summer	Thong Saw Pak	Weightlifting
3	1956	Summer	Lionel Chee	Water polo
4	1960	Summer		
5	1968	Summer		
6	1972	Summer	Pat Chan	Swimming
7	1976	Summer	Koh Eng Kian	Judo
8	1984	Summer	Ang Peng Siong	Swimming
9	1988	Summer	Ang Peng Siong	Swimming
10	1992	Summer	Chng Seng Mok	Shooting
11	1996	Summer	Lee Wung Yew	Shooting
12	2000	Summer	Joscelin Yeo	Swimming
13	2004	Summer	Ronald Susilo	Badminton
14	2008	Summer	Li Jiawei	Table tennis
15	2012	Summer	Feng Tianwei	Table tennis
16	2016	Summer	Derek Wong	Badminton
17	2018	Winter	Cheyenne Goh	Short track speed skating
18	2020	Summer	Loh Kean Yew	Badminton
18	2020	Summer	Yu Mengyu	Table tennis
19	2024	Summer	Ryan Lo	Sailing
19	2024	Summer	Shanti Pereira	Athletics

== See also ==
- Singapore at the Olympics
