= Isaac Mansoor =

Indian swimmer (1929–2006)

Personal information
- National team: India
- Born: 30 May 1929 Bombay, British India
- Died: July 2006 (aged 77) Haifa, Israel

Sport
- Sport: Swimming
- Strokes: Freestyle
Medal record
Men's swimming
Representing India
Asian Games
Bronze medal – third place	1951 New Delhi	4×100 m freestyle relay
Men's water polo
Representing India
Asian Games
Gold medal – first place	1951 New Delhi	Team

Isaac Mansoor (30 May 1929 – July 2006) was an Indian swimmer. He competed in men's 100 metre freestyle and the water polo tournaments at the 1948 Summer Olympics and the 1952 Summer Olympics.
