= UAAP Season 42 men's basketball tournament =

Basketball competition in the Philippines

1979 UAAP season
- Host school: University of the Philippines
Men's Finals	G1	Wins
FEU Tamaraws	100	1+1
UST Glowing Goldies	89	0
- Duration: October 12, 1979
- Arena(s): Loyola Center
- Winning coach: Arturo Valenzona
- TV network(s): IBC, GTV Channel 4

The 1979 UAAP men's basketball tournament was the 42nd year of the men's tournament of the University Athletic Association of the Philippines (UAAP)'s basketball championship. Hosted by University of the Philippines, the FEU Tamaraws defeated the UST Glowing Goldies in the finals taking their tenth overall UAAP men's basketball championship and the first of their three-peat title run from 1979 to 1981. The Tamaraws would eventually achieve the first sweep of the tournament (12–0) the following year and were automatically declared champions. The UAAP have seven teams then with the admission of Ateneo in 1978. This was the last finals match-up between FEU and UST until 2015 in Season 78. This was also the year when the UAAP first implemented the twice to beat finals format.

== Participating schools ==
Teams	Head coach
Adamson Falcons	Clemente Bargas
Ateneo Blue Eagles	Bobby Littaua
FEU Tamaraws	Arturo Valenzona
NU Bulldogs	Sonny Paguia
UE Warriors	Roehl Nadurata
UP Maroons	Honesto Mayoralgo
UST Glowing Goldies	Rogelio Serafico

== Elimination round ==
Tournament format:

- Double round robin; the two teams with the best records advance to the Finals:
  - The #1 seed will only need to win once to clinch the championship.
  - The #2 seed has to win twice to clinch the championship.

== Finals ==
Number 1 seed FEU only need to win once, while number 2 seed UST need to win twice, to clinch the championship.

October 12

FEU Tamaraws	100–89	UST Glowing Goldies
FEU wins series after one game

Loyola Center

Far Eastern University, with a twice-to-beat advantage and displaying its usual bruising brand, clobbered the University of Santo Tomas Goldies who showed up minus its scoring ace Edgardo Cordero, to clinch the UAAP varsity cage title. Cordero, the 6'4" scoring leader of the league, was down with flu. The final score, 100–89, clearly showed FEU's mastery of the Goldies.

Anthony Williams, an ex-US marine who played his finest game in the series, topscored for the winning team with 35 points. And although the usually-unshakable Arturo "Bai" Cristobal was limited to 15, FEU's diminutive skipper Danilo Manalastas poured-in 17 to neutralize the combined effort of 63 tallied by UST's Francisco Natividad and Edmund Yee. Natividad finished with 38, 28 of them in the second half, while the high-leaping Yee, who saw little action with Crispa (MICAA) in the last National Seniors, came-up with 25.

Preceded by Season 41 (1978)	UAAP basketball seasons Season 42 (1979) basketball	Succeeded by Season 43 (1980)
