= Jacinto Cayco =

Filipino swimmer and referee (1924–2021)

Personal information
- National team: Philippines
- Born: 1924
- Died: 17 February 2021 (aged 96)

Sport
- Sport: Swimming
- College team: University of Santo Tomas
Medal record
Men's swimming
Representing Philippines
Asian Games
Gold medal – first place	1951 New Delhi	200m breaststroke
Gold medal – first place	1951 New Delhi	3x100 medley relay
Silver medal – second place	1958 Tokyo	4x100 medley relay

Jacinto S. Cayco (1924 – 17 February 2021) was a Filipino swimmer and referee who competed in the 1948 Summer Olympics. He also had a brother named, Pedro who competed in the 1956 Summer Olympics.

Cayco won two gold medals at the 1951 Asian Games; one at the 200 meters breaststroke event and the other was won with Nurhatab Rajab and Artemio Salamat at the 3x100 medley relay. At the 1954 Asian Games he was captain of the swimming team. At the 1958 Asian Games he won a silver medal at the 4x100 medley relay with three other swimmers.

He was also a varsity player of the University of Santo Tomas swimming team from 1946 to 1953. After his competitive stint as a swimmer he became a referee. As a referee he officiated at the 1981 Southeast Asian Games and in national-level competitions such as the Palarong Pambansa, Philippine National Games, and Batang Pinoy. Cayco was named into the Philippine Sports Hall of Fame on 25 January 2016. He died on 17 February 2021 at the age of 96.
