= UAAP Season 20 men's basketball tournament =

Basketball competition in the Philippines

1957 UAAP season
- Host school: University of the Philippines
Men's Finals	G1	Wins
UE Red Warriors	64	1
UST Glowing Goldies	55	0
- Duration: September 17, 1957
- Arena(s): Rizal Memorial Coliseum
- Winning coach: Baby Dalupan

The 1957 UAAP men's basketball tournament was the 20th year of the men's tournament of the University Athletic Association of the Philippines (UAAP)'s basketball championship. Hosted by University of the Philippines, the UE Warriors defeated the UST Glowing Goldies in a single game finals taking their first UAAP men's basketball championship since joining the league in 1952.

== Finals ==
University of the East Red Warriors finally hit it big in the UAAP basketball tournament as they subdued arch rival University of Santo Tomas, 64–55, to win the crown at the jampacked Rizal Memorial Coliseum. This was the first UAAP crown for coach Baby Dalupan's charges since they joined the league in 1952. Early this year, the Warriors took the National Inter-Collegiate plum.

The Warriors double-teamed UST's high-scoring Rosendo Libunao, who managed only 22 points, eight below his usual average, the game was close only in the first few minutes when the Goldies managed to pull abreast at 9-all, from thereon it was an all-UE show as Roberto Flores and Filomeno Pumaren shackled Libunao while Constancio Ortiz unloaded bombs from the outside. The peppery Ortiz, who finished with 17 points, opened the second half with a three-point play off Roberto Yburan while Pumaren and Flores combined for a 7-2 bomb for a 39-21 UE lead.

Coach Baby Dalupan praised UST for playing "good basketball", Losing coach Herminio Silva attributed the team's loss to the Goldies' anemic outside shooting. "We just can't sink those long shots," said Silva.

Preceded by Season 19 (1956)	UAAP basketball seasons Season 20 (1957) basketball	Succeeded by Season 21 (1958)
