= Wiebe Wolters =

Singaporean sportsman

Personal information
- Full name: Wiebe Johan Wolters
- Born: 25 December 1932 Dutch East Indies
- Died: 15 January 2011 (aged 78) Mijas, Spain

Sport
- Country: Singapore
- Sport: Swimming, Water polo
- Club: Singapore Swimming Club
Medal record
Asian Games
Swimming
Gold medal – first place	1951 New Delhi	4 x 100 m freestyle
Silver medal – second place	1951 New Delhi	100 m freestyle
Water polo
Gold medal – first place	1954 Manila	Team
Silver medal – second place	1951 New Delhi	Team

Wiebe Johan Wolters (25 December 1932 – 15 January 2011) was a Singaporean sportsman who represented his country in swimming and water polo.

== Biography ==
Born in the Dutch East Indies, Wolters moved to Singapore as a child, Wolters started out as a competitive swimmer, specialising in sprint events. He won a silver medal in the 100 m freestyle at the 1951 Asian Games in New Delhi and was a member of the 4 x 100 m freestyle gold medal winning relay team.

Unable to make the Olympics as a swimmer, he changed his focus to water polo and won another Asian Games gold medal in 1954 with the Singapore men's national water polo team. He represented Singapore in water polo at the 1956 Summer Olympics in Melbourne, where the team finished 10th. His elder brother Alexander was one of his teammates.
