= UAAP Season 38 men's basketball tournament =

Basketball competition in the Philippines

1975 UAAP season
- Host school: University of the East
Men's Finals	G1	Wins
UE Red Warriors	85	1
FEU Tamaraws	80	0
- Duration: October 1975
- Arena(s): Rizal Memorial Coliseum
- Winning coach: Filomeno Pumaren

The 1975 UAAP men's basketball tournament was the 38th year of the men's tournament of the University Athletic Association of the Philippines (UAAP)'s basketball championship. Hosted by University of the East, the UE Warriors defeated the FEU Tamaraws in the finals taking their fourteenth overall and back-to-back UAAP men's basketball championship.

== Finals ==
University of the East, with Tito Varela providing the hustle and power and Emer Legaspi humbling the number of guards thrown to him, beat Far Eastern University, 85-80, to retain the title it won from the same team the prior year.

Emer Legaspi, the same Warrior the Tamaraws limited to 11 in their clash a week before the championship fight, finished with 31. FEU's Anastacio Deles and Pablo Javier, failed miserably in containing the UE hotshot who got all the screens he needed from Varela and Benjie Chua. Varela showed his national teammate Nicanor Bulaong what power in basketball could be. FEU's duo of Bulaong and Anthony Dasalla proved no match to UE's head-shaven hero.

Preceded by Season 37 (1974)	UAAP basketball seasons Season 38 (1975) basketball	Succeeded by Season 39 (1976)
