= Rene Amabuyok =

Filipino swimmer

René Amabuyok
Personal information
- Born: Rene Taliti Kobuyama; 10 July 1923 Zamboanga, Philippines

Sport
- Sport: Swimming
Medal record
Representing Philippines
Asian Games
Silver medal – second place	1951 New Delhi	200m breaststroke

René Taliti Kobuyama-Amabuyok (born 10 July 1923, date of death unknown) was a Filipino swimmer. He competed in the men's 200 metre breaststroke at the 1948 Summer Olympics.
