= UAAP Season 43 men's basketball tournament =

Basketball competition in the Philippines

1980 UAAP season
- Host school: University of the Philippines Diliman

Men's tournament
- Champions: FEU Tamaraws
- First runner-up: UST Growling Tigers
- Winning coach: Turo Valenzona

UAAP Season 43 men's basketball tournament is the 1980 season of the University Athletic Association of the Philippines, which was hosted by the University of the Philippines Diliman. The opening of the 1980-1981 edition of the UAAP takes place on July 20, 1980 at the Loyola Center.

Participated by its seven schools, University of the Philippines, University of Santo Tomas, University of the East, Far Eastern University, Adamson University, National University and Ateneo de Manila University.

== Men's basketball ==
The Far Eastern University (FEU) Tamaraws, bagged the title by scoring a rare and first sweep of the UAAP basketball series. The last team that FEU beat was the UST Glowing Goldies who ranked second in the team standings. Had UST won the last match, there would have been a twice to beat finals between the two teams in FEU's advantage. Since going into the final game, the power-leaping and hustling center of the Tamaraws, ex-US marine Anthony Williams, was good for 27 points per game.

Preceded by Season 42 (1979)	UAAP basketball seasons Season 43 (1980) basketball	Succeeded by Season 44 (1981)
