= UAAP Season 21 men's basketball tournament =

Basketball competition in the Philippines

1958 UAAP season
- Host school: University of the East
| Men's Finals | G1 | Wins |
|---|---|---|
| UE Red Warriors | 102 | 1 |
| MCU Tigers | 88 | 0 |
- Duration: September 16, 1958
- Arena(s): Rizal Memorial Coliseum
- Winning coach: Baby Dalupan

The 1958 UAAP men's basketball tournament was the 21st year of the men's tournament of the University Athletic Association of the Philippines (UAAP)'s basketball championship. Hosted by University of the East, the UE Warriors defeated the MCU Tigers in a single game finals taking their second straight UAAP men's basketball championship since joining the league in 1952. This was the only finals appearance of Manila Central University before pulling out of the league in 1962. MCU was the only former UAAP member school that reached the basketball tournament finals.

== Finals ==
Olympian Constancio Ortiz sizzled all night long with his outside shots as he bannered defending champion University of the East to its second straight UAAP crown by blasting Manila Central University, 102-88, before a sparse crowd of 4,000 at the Rizal Memorial Coliseum.

Ortiz, the Warriors’ top rifleman, mocked all guards thrown at him by the Tigers, as he scored a league record of 51 points which eclipsed the 46 registered by University of Manila’s Vicente Casado five years earlier. Also overshadowed by Ortiz’s impeccable outside shooting was the 43-point output of National University’s Narciso Bernardo, the best individual scoring record the previous year.

With Ortiz running rings around MCU’s Damian Lim, Henry Hill and Juan Rivera, the Warriors took a 16-8 advantage but the Tigers rallied mightily through the heads-up plays of Manuel Abella, Ernesto Gonzalo Jr., Eduardo Zamora and Rivera to deadlock the game at 16-16. Both teams battled evenly as the Tigers gallantly frustrated the Warriors’ breakaway bid until the sweet shooting Ortiz resumed his net ripping chores that gave the Azcarraga-based dribblers a 50-42 halftime advantage. The Warriors managed to post a 53-44 lead early in the final half but again MCU struck back, chopping the advantage to just five, 52-57. Undaunted, the Warriors, with Ortiz getting able support from Roehl Nadurata, Mario Uson and Agapito de Castro, widened UE’s advantage to 12, 82-70, en route to an unassailable 100-82 advantage, two minutes left.

| Preceded by Season 20 (1957) | UAAP basketball seasons Season 21 (1958) basketball | Succeeded by Season 22 (1959) |
