= Swimming in India =

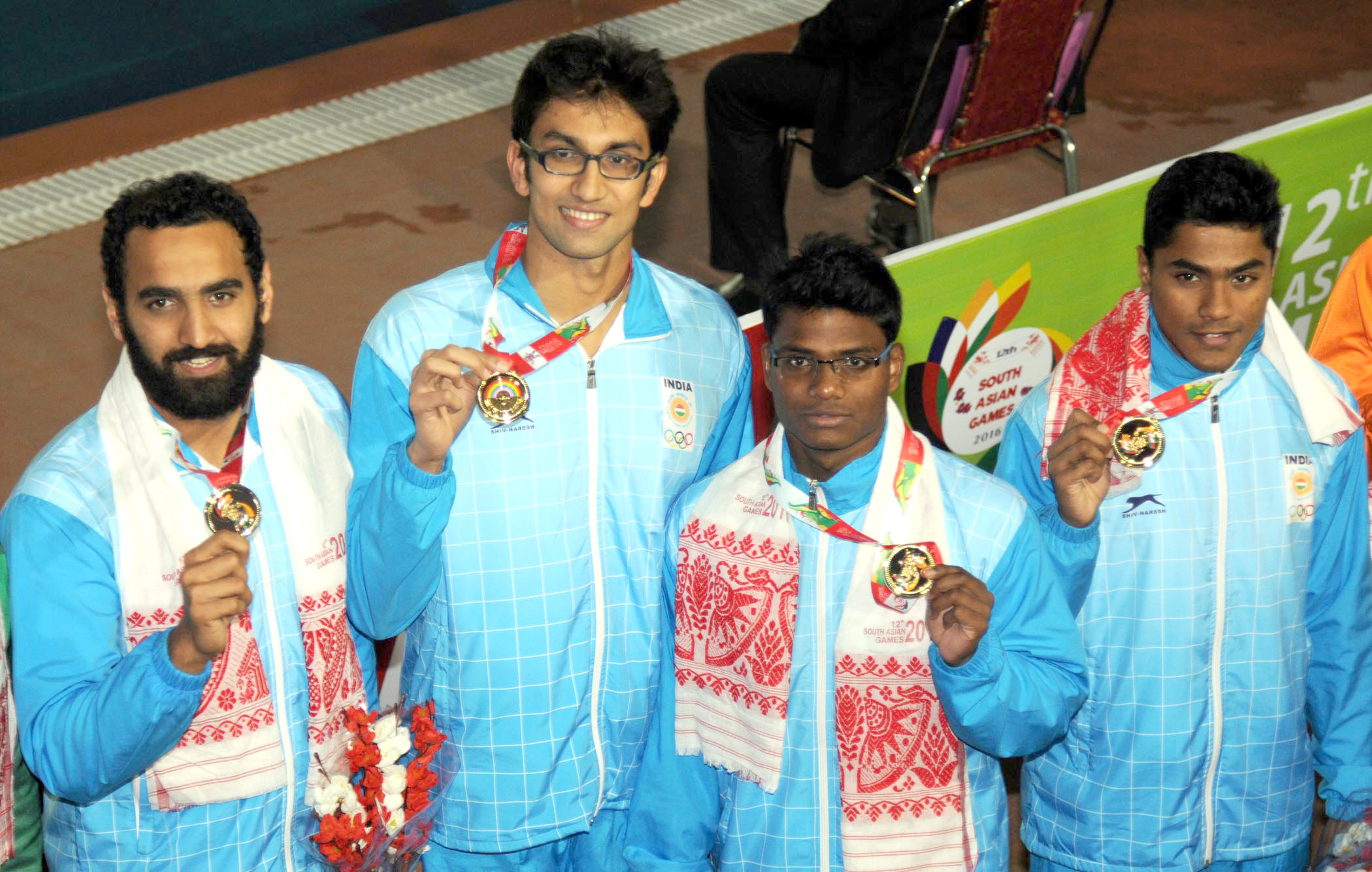
- Gold medal winners of Indian men's 4x100m medley in swimming, at the 12th South Asian Games 2016
- Governing body: Swimming Federation of India

Swimming is widely practiced in India, but only leisurely and not commonly as a professional sport.

Swimming sport in India is administered by the Swimming Federation of India. SFI was formed by the merger of the National Swimming Association (NSA) and the Indian Swimming Federation (ISF).

Indian swimmer Srihari Nataraj won silver in the 50m backstroke event at the 30th Mare Nostrum swimming tour at the Canet-en-Roussillon, France.

== Background ==
In 2020 SFI prepared a plan for the long-term development of the sport. A workshop was organised in 2021 with Dr. Genadijus Sokolovas. In 2024, the Inspire Institute of Sport launched the Mizuho High Performance Swimming Programme in partnership with Mizuho Bank.

== Olympics ==
Sajan Prakash and Srihari Nataraj achieved direct qualification for the Tokyo 2020 Olympics, a feat never achieved by any Indian swimmer before. Dhinidhi Desinghu, the youngest member of the Indian Olympic contingent, and Srihari Nataraj will represent India in swimming at the 2024 Paris Olympics.

== Asian Games ==
India has won one gold in the Asian Games, which was bagged by Sachin Nag in the 100m freestyle at the inaugural edition in New Delhi. The country has won two silver and 6 bronze overall, the latest being Sandeep Sejwal's bronze in the 2014 Asiad in Incheon, South Korea. India sent a 23-member contingent, including 9 women to the 2023 Asian Games in Hangzhou, China. The Indian swimmers qualified for the finals of three events and set seven national records in Hangzhou, but did not win any medals.

== Commonwealth games ==
India has won one bronze at the Commonwealth Games.

== Medal table ==
Tournament	Gold	Silver	Bronze	Total
Asian Games	1	2	6	8
Commonwealth Games	0	0	1	1
Total	1	2	7	9

- Updated till 5 August 2024

== National award recipients ==
Year	Recipient	Award	Gender
1961	Bajarangi Prasad	Arjuna Award	Male
1966	Rima Dutta	Arjuna Award	Female
1967	Arun Shaw	Arjuna Award	Male
1969	Baidyanath Nath	Arjuna Award	Male
1971	Bhanwar Singh	Arjuna Award	Male
1973	Dhanvir Khatau	Arjuna Award	Male
1974	Manjari Bhargava	Arjuna Award	Female
1974	Avinash B. Sarang	Arjuna Award	Male
1975	Smita Desai	Arjuna Award	Female
1975	M. S. Rana	Arjuna Award	Male
1982	Persis Madan	Arjuna Award	Female
1983	Anita Sood	Arjuna Award	Male
1984	Khajan Singh	Arjuna Award	Male
1988	Wilson Cherian	Arjuna Award	Male
1990	Bula Choudhury	Arjuna Award	Female
1996	V. Kutraleeswaran	Arjuna Award	Male
1998	Bhanu Sachdeva	Arjuna Award	Male
1999	Nisha Millet	Arjuna Award	Female
2000	J. Abhijith	Arjuna Award	Male
2000	Sebastian Xavier	Arjuna Award	Male
2005	Shikha Tandon	Arjuna Award	Female
2010	Rehan Poncha	Arjuna Award	Male
2011	Virdhawal Khade	Arjuna Award	Male
2012	Sandeep Sejwal	Arjuna Award	Male
2011	Sushil Kohli	Dhyan Chand Award	Male
2014	K. P. Thakkar	Dhyan Chand Award	Male
2020	Sachin Nag^{#}	Dhyan Chand Award	Male
2015	Nihar Ameen ^{+}	Dronacharya Award	Male
2016	S. Pradeep Kumar ^{+}	Dronacharya Award	Male
2021	Tapan Kumar Panigrahi ^{+}	Dronacharya Award	Male

Key
+ Indicates a Lifetime contribution honour	# Indicates a posthumous honour
