= Pilo Pumaren =

Filipino basketball player and coach

Career information
- College: UE
- Coaching career: 1975–1996

Career history

Coaching
- 1972–1978: UE
- 1977–1979: Crispa 400
- 1979–1980: Gilbey's Gin
- 1980–1986: Northern Cement basketball team (assistant)
- 1981: Philippines
- 1986–1997: San Miguel Beermen (assistant)

Career highlights
- As coach: 2× UAAP champions (1975, 1978); As assistant coach: 6× PBA champion (1989 Open, All-Filipino, 1989 Reinforced, 1992 All-Filipino, 1993 Governors', 1994 All-Filipino); Grand Slam champions (1989); As player: UAAP champions (1957)
Medals
Men's basketball
Head coach for Philippines
SEA Games
Gold medal – first place	1981 Manila	Team
Assistant coach for Philippines
ABC Championship
Gold medal – first place	1985 Kuala Lumpur	Team
ABC Under 18 Championship
Gold medal – first place	1982 Manila	team
SEA Games
Gold medal – first place	1985 Bangkok	Team
William Jones Cup
Gold medal – first place	1981 Taipei	team
Gold medal – first place	1985 Taipei	Team

Filomeno "Pilo" Pumaren Jr. is a Filipino former basketball player and coach.

== Career ==
=== Playing ===
Pumaren played for 1957 UE team that won its first UAAP championship.

=== Coaching ===
Pumaren started as head coach of UE Red Warriors. He led the team into two championships (1975 and 1978). He served as an assistant to Ron Jacobs to Northern Cement.

He worked for Gilbey's Gin (now Ginebra) as its head coach, and later worked for San Miguel Beermen as their assistant coach until 1996.

== Personal life ==
He is the father of Franz, Derrick, and Dindo.
