= India men's national water polo team =

Men's national water polo team representing India

India
- FINA code: IND
- Nickname(s): Bengal Tigers
- Association: Swimming Federation of India
- Confederation: AASF (Asia)

Olympic Games
- Appearances: 2 (first in 1948)
- Best result: 12th place (1948)

Asian Games
- Appearances: 5 (first in 1951)
- Best result: (gold) Gold medal (1951)

Asian Championships
- Best result: 9th place (2022, 2025 )

The India men's national water polo team represents India in international men's water polo. Water Polo in India is governed by the Swimming Federation of India (SFI). India's men's best performance was when they won gold at the 1951 Asian Games. The India men's national water polo team also won a silver medal at the 1970 Asian Games, losing to Japan, 4 goals to 3 in the finals. The next time India won a medal was a bronze at the 1982 Asian Games.

== Results ==
=== Olympic Games ===
- (United Kingdom) 1948 — 12th place
- (Finland) 1952 — 21st place

=== Asian Games ===
- (India) 1951 – (gold) Gold
- (Thailand) 1970 – (silver) Silver
- (Iran) 1974 – 6th place
- (India) 1982 – (bronze) Bronze
- (South Korea) 1986 – 6th place

=== Asian Championships ===
- (Thailand) 2022 – 9th place
- (India) 2025 – 9th place

== 2018 Asian Games ==
As of July 2018, as per the Swimming Federation of India (SFI)'s announcement of the team for the Asian Games, the team stood as follows:

Aneesh Babu (GK), Akshay Kumar Kunde, Ashwini Kumar Kunde, Adarsh VS, Uday Uttekar, Prithish Das, Sarang Vaidya, Aneesh Kumar, Karthik Ch Das, Shibin Lal, Manimaran D, S Ratheesh Kumar, Monjith Hasan, Lal Krishna, and J Shreejith.

However, later the Indian Olympic Association decided against sending the Men's National Water polo team to the 2018 Asian Games.
