= Lionel Chee =

Singaporean water polo player (born 1931)

Personal information
- Nationality: Singaporean
- Born: 4 August 1931 (age 94)

Sport
- Sport: Water polo
Medal record
Representing Singapore
Asian Games
Swimming
Gold medal – first place	1951 New Delhi	4x100m freestyle relay
Silver medal – second place	1951 New Delhi	3x100m medley relay
Silver medal – second place	1954 Manila	4x200m freestyle relay
Water polo
Silver medal – second place	1951 New Delhi	Men's tournament
Silver medal – second place	1958 Tokyo	Men's tournament
Bronze medal – third place	1962 Jakarta	Men's tournament

Lionel Chee (born 4 August 1931) is a Singaporean water polo player. He competed in the men's tournament at the 1956 Summer Olympics.

He was given the honour of carrying the national flag of Singapore at the opening ceremony of the 1956 Summer Olympics in Melbourne, becoming the eighth water polo player to be a flag bearer at the opening and closing ceremonies of the Olympics.
