= Neo Chwee Kok =

Singaporean swimmer (1931–1987)

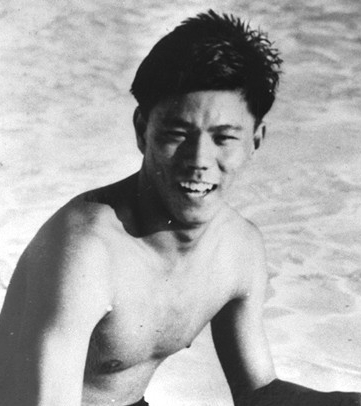
- Neo at the 1952 Summer Olympics

Personal information
- Full name: Neo Chwee Kok, John Paul
- Nickname: Flying Fish
- National team: Singapore
- Born: 31 May 1931 Singapore
- Died: 23 January 1987 (aged 55) Singapore

Sport
- Sport: Swimming
- Strokes: Freestyle
Medal record
Men's swimming
Asian Games
Gold medal – first place	1951 New Delhi	400 m freestyle
Gold medal – first place	1951 New Delhi	800 m freestyle
Gold medal – first place	1951 New Delhi	1500 m freestyle
Gold medal – first place	1951 New Delhi	4×100 m freestyle
Silver medal – second place	1951 New Delhi	3×100 m medley
Silver medal – second place	1954 Manila	4×200 m freestyle
Bronze medal – third place	1954 Manila	100 m freestyle

Neo Chwee Kok, John Paul (Chinese: 梁水国; pinyin: Liáng Shuǐguó; 31 May 1931 – 23 January 1987) was a legendary Singaporean swimmer who competed in the 1952 Summer Olympics. He was ranked third in a list of Singapore's 50 Greatest Athletes of the Century by The Straits Times in 1999.

== Early life ==
Neo was born the fifth child in a family of eight in Singapore but grew up on Pulau Sambu, Riau, Indonesia.

== Swimming career ==
In 1951, Neo was part of the Singapore contingent participating at the inaugural Asian Games. Neo won 400m, 800m and 1,500m and the 4 × 100 m freestyle events and a silver at the 3x100m medley event.

In 1952, Neo was selected for the 1952 Summer Olympics held in Helsinki, Finland.

After retiring from competitive swimming, Neo became a coach at Singapore Swimming Club.

== Personal life ==
On 23 January 1987, Neo died of cancer at the age of 55.
