= UAAP Season 41 men's basketball tournament =

Basketball competition in the Philippines

1978 UAAP season
- Host school: National University
Men's Finals	G1	Wins
UE Red Warriors	86	1
Adamson Falcons	84	0
- Duration: October 1978
- Arena(s): Loyola Center
- Winning coach: Filomeno Pumaren

The 1978 UAAP men's basketball tournament was the 41st year of the men's tournament of the University Athletic Association of the Philippines (UAAP)'s basketball championship. Hosted by National University, the UE Warriors defeated the defending champions Adamson Falcons in the finals taking their fifteenth overall UAAP men's basketball championship. Prior to the start of the season, Ateneo de Manila University was admitted as the seventh member school of the league.

Preceded by Season 40 (1977)	UAAP basketball seasons Season 41 (1978) basketball	Succeeded by Season 42 (1979)
