= Bernabe Lovina =

Filipino sprinter (1921–1985)

Personal information
- Full name: Bernabe Obana Lovina
- Nationality: Filipino
- Born: June 11, 1921 San Quintin, Pangasinan, Philippine Islands
- Died: April 15, 1985 (aged 63) San Francisco, California, U.S.

Sport
- Sport: Sprinting
- Event: 100 metres

Bernabe Obana Lovina (June 11, 1921 – April 15, 1985) was a Filipino sprinter. He competed in the men's 100 metres at the 1948 Summer Olympics.
