= FEU Tamaraws and Lady Tamaraws =

Varsity teams

- School: Far Eastern University
- League: UAAP
- Joined: 1938
- Former league: NCAA (1924–1936; founding member)
- Location: College – Sampaloc, Manila; High School – Diliman, Quezon City
- Athletic director: Mark Molina
- Team colors: Green Gold
- Juniors' team: Baby Tamaraws

Seniors' general championships
- UAAP: 16 1947–48 1948–49 1949–50 1950–51 1951–52 1952–53 1953–54 1954–55 1955–56 1956–57 1957–58 1959–60 1966–67 1968–69 1973–74 1981–82

Juniors' general championships
- UAAP: none

The FEU Tamaraws and Lady Tamaraws are the varsity teams of Far Eastern University in the University Athletic Association of the Philippines (UAAP). The university's high school varsity teams are called the Baby Tamaraws.

== History ==
Far Eastern University was one of the founding members of the National Collegiate Athletic Association (NCAA) of the Philippines in 1924. The team participated in the NCAA Philippines in 1929, then eventually withdrew in 1935 to join the Big 3 League composed of the universities which left the NCAA in 1932. Far Eastern University together with the University of the Philippines, University of Santo Tomas, and National University founded the University Athletic Association of the Philippines in 1938. FEU offers varsity sports in basketball (5x5 and 3x3), volleyball, beach volleyball, football, futsal, badminton, tennis, swimming, taekwondo, table tennis, chess, softball, fencing, and track & field.

== Team mascot and colors ==
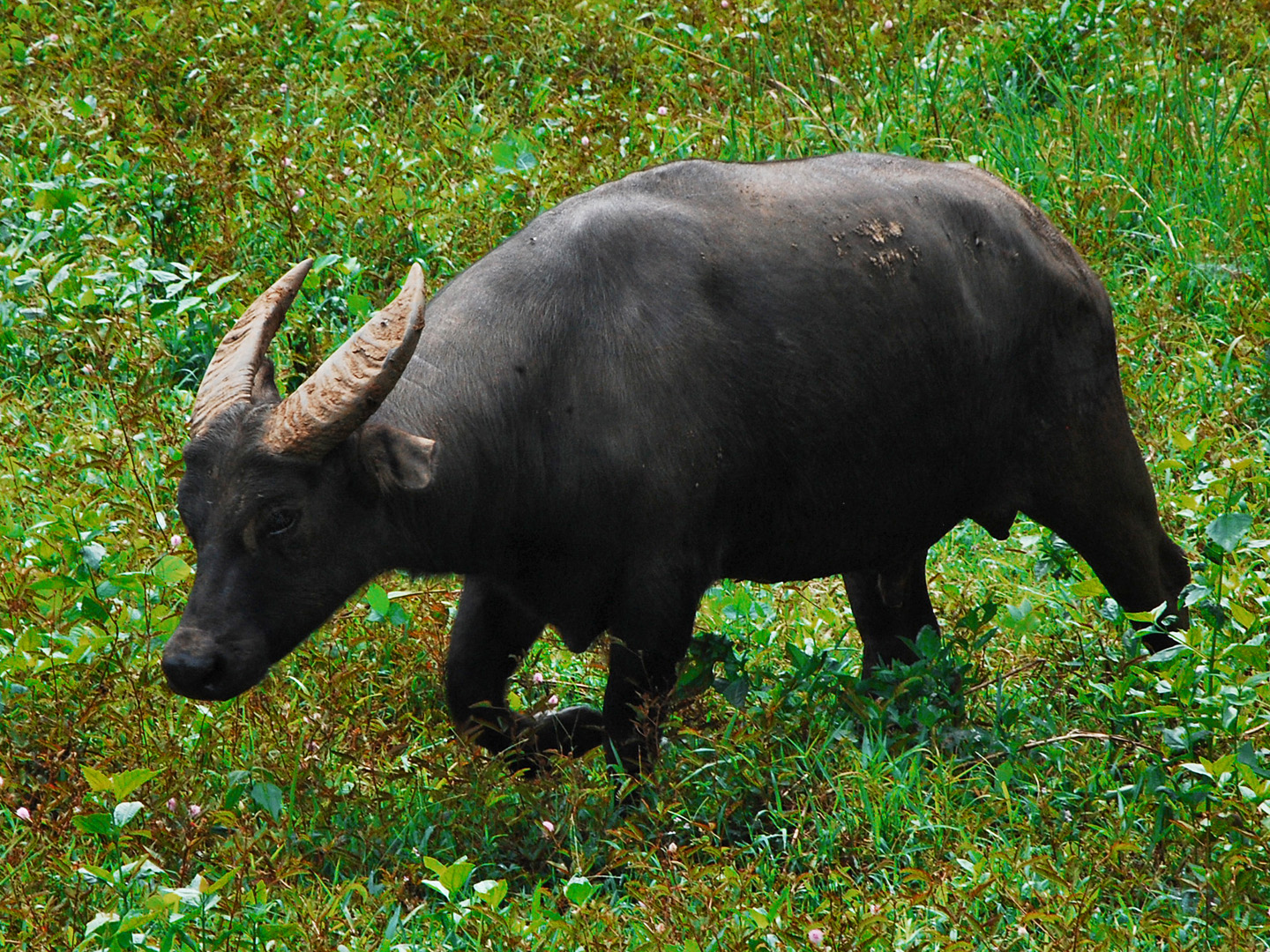
Tamaraw in wild

The Tamaraw is the mascot of all FEU athletic teams. Known scientifically as Bubalus mindorensis, it is a rare animal found only in the island of Mindoro. The local endemic animal was chosen originally by the FEU founder, Dr. Nicanor Reyes Sr., for his admiration of its strength and intelligence. The Tamaraw icon has eventually transformed into a nationalistic and culturally significant symbol for ferociousness.

The team's color are that of the university, green and gold. With green representing hope, as quoted from the National Hero, Dr. Jose Rizal's "Fair hope of the Fatherland", and gold, representing the university's golden opportunity to serve the youth and country.

Green and gold, the school colors of FEU

== Sports ==
=== Basketball ===
FEU won their first men's and women's UAAP basketball championships in 1938–39 and 1950–1951, respectively. The Tamaraws have the most championships in the men's basketball division, having won 20 titles. FEU ranks second in total number of combined championships won in the juniors, women's, and men's basketball divisions. In Season 68, the FEU Tamaraws won their 19th title by sweeping the De La Salle Green Archers in their best of three championship series, played at the Araneta Coliseum on October 6, 2005.

In season 71, the Tamaraws finished the elimination round with 10 wins and 4 losses. They lost game one of the semifinals to the De La Salle Green Archers on September 11, 2008, then bowed out of contention three days later after losing game 2.

On October 15, 2014, the FEU Tamaraws lost their championship series against the NU Bulldogs in three games.

In Season 78 (2015–16), the Tamaraws claimed their 20th title in the men's basketball tournament. FEU won against UST in three games in their Finals series with Game 3 played on December 2, 2015 at the Mall of Asia Arena.

==== Notable players ====
Men's division

- Johnny Abarrientos
- Francis Adriano
- Manuel Araneta
- Mac Baracael
- Mac Belo
- Mark Bringas
- Glenn Capacio
- JR Cawaling
- Jeff Chan
- Carl Bryan Cruz
- Celino Cruz
- Romy Diaz
- Barkley Eboña
- Russel Escoto
- Benedict Fernandez
- Jorge Gallent
- RR Garcia
- Mark Isip
- Raymar Jose
- Denok Miranda
- Victor Pablo
- Marc Pingris
- Roger Pogoy
- Terrence Romeo
- Arwind Santos
- Arvin Tolentino
- Mike Tolomia
- Ken Tuffin
- Turo Valenzona
- Jonas Villanueva

==== Rivals ====
- UE Red Warriors were involved in the rivalry called the "Battle of the East" with the FEU Tamaraws. Both the Red Warriors and the Tamaraws dominated the UAAP basketball tournaments from the 1950s up to the late 1980s. The Tamaraws came out on top of this rivalry having won 20 titles to the 18 titles of the Red Warriors.
- De La Salle Green Archers rivalry was sparked during the finals of season 54 (1991) when La Salle's win in game 1 (where La Salle was twice-to-beat) was protested by FEU. The UAAP board upheld the protest and ordered the replay. La Salle did not show up, claiming to have won legitimately. This resulted in the awarding of the championship trophy to FEU by the UAAP board. La Salle responded with a victory parade that passed through the other seven UAAP schools. When they passed through the FEU campus, the motorcade was bombarded with debris. In season 67 (2004), La Salle had to give up another trophy to FEU. Two Green Archers were found to have falsified documents, thus the trophy was awarded again to FEU, who were the finals opponent of La Salle. The rivalry is unofficially known as the "Battle of the Greens", because both teams sport green in their uniforms.

==== UAAP titles ====
- Men's basketball: 20 – 1938, 1939, 1947, 1950, 1956, 1961, 1972, 1973, 1976, 1979, 1980, 1981, 1983, 1991, 1992, 1997, 2003, 2004, 2005, and 2015.
- Women's basketball: 11 – 1950, 1951, 1952, 1953, 1991, 1996, 1997, 1998, 2008, 2011 and 2012
- Juniors' basketball: 9 – 1948, 1949, 1950, 1951, 1952, 1953, 1987, 2012, and 2016

=== Volleyball ===
The FEU Tamaraw Spikers won their first UAAP volleyball title in season 9 (1946–47), while the FEU Lady Tamaraw Spikers won their first in season 11 (1948–49). As of UAAP Season 75 the Tamaraws have won 25 UAAP volleyball titles while the Lady Tamaraws have 29 UAAP championships. The Tamaraw Spikers has the longest championship streak in the UAAP. They were champions for twelve consecutive seasons, from 1946 to 1957.

==== Rivals ====
- UST Growling Tigers and the FEU women's volleyball teams battled in the Finals for as long as 15 seasons (1988–2003), wherein 9 titles were won by the Lady Tamaraw Spikers
- UP Fighting Maroons, considered one of the powerhouses in UAAP men's volleyball, ranks second to FEU (as of UAAP Season 69) in the number of men's volleyball championships. They won 9 titles. While FEU has 11 titles. The two teams competed for the men's volleyball championship in 8 seasons, 4 of which were won by the Tamaraws

=== Notable players ===
- Geneveve Casugod
- Rachel Daquis
- Maica Morada
- Bernadeth Pons
- Tina Salak
- Rosemarie Vargas
- Buding Duremdes
- Lycha Ebon
- Joanne Bunag
- Kyla Atienza
- Kyle Negrito
- Celine Domingo
- Gel Cayuna
- Remy Palma
- Gyzelle Sy
- Jerrili Malabanan
- Tin Agno
- Wendy Semana
- Cherry May Vivas
- Gyzelle Sy
- Monica Aleta -->

=== Football ===
The FEU Tamaraw Booters, under coach Orlando Plagata, won their first title in the UAAP Football tournament in 1980–1981, while the FEU Lady Tamaraw Booters won their first title in 1983–1984.

Since season 59, the FEU Tamaraw Booters have won 5 men's football titles (tied for third most), 11 women's football titles (tied for most), and 11 boys' football titles (the most), the most across all three competitions

Outside the UAAP, the women's football team were also crowned champions in three editions of the PFF Women's Cup (2014, 2015, and 2022). It has also competed in international tournaments such as in the 2015 HCM City International Women Football Tournament in Vietnam where it finished fourth out of four participating teams.

==== Rivals ====
- Ateneo Blue Eagles started in 1983, the men's football rivalry lasted for 5 years, where 2 titles were won by FEU.
- De La Salle Green Archers, this FEU-DLSU football rivalry emerged in 1996, which then lasted for as long as 9 years. 5 titles were won by the FEU Lady Tamaraw Booters from the DLSU Lady Archers.

=== Track and Field ===
The FEU Charging Tamaraws won their first championship in track and field in UAAP Season 10 (1947–48), while the FEU Charging Lady Tamaraws won their first championship in UAAP Season 13 (1950–51). FEU currently ranks first, in terms of number of titles won in the UAAP track and field competition, with 57 titles, followed by Ateneo Blue Eagles with 29 titles, and NU Bulldogs with 27 titles since the conception of the UAAP.

The Charging Lady Tamaraws currently own the longest winning streak in the said sport. They've been UAAP track and field champions for 7 consecutive seasons, and currently has the most titles in women's track and field with 30 titles, while the Charging Tamaraws, are also tops among participating universities in the sport, with 27 titles.

==== Notable athletes ====
Marestella Torres	23rd SEA Games Gold Medalist, Manila Philippines; Silver medalist, Women's Long Jump, 16th Asian Athletic Championships, Korea, 2005, Olympian 2008 Beijing Olympics
Lerma Bulauitan	Sea Games gold medalist, 2003 Grand Prix Gold Medalist, Olympian Sydney Olympics
Elma Muros	SEA Games multiple gold medalist

== FEU Cheering Squad ==
The FEU Cheering Squad consists of two major groups. They either perform during halftime performances in major games and events in the UAAP or other sport competitions participated by the university athletes (FEU Cheerdancers) or lead the FEU crowd in cheering during the said events though the university's chants or cheers (FEU Cheerleaders).

FEU Cheerdancers

The FEU Cheer Dancers are the university's cheer dance group, consisting mainly of gymnasts and dancers. They participate in the UAAP Cheer Dance Competition (CDC), and other related exhibitions and competitions.

FEU Cheerleaders

Formerly known as the "Boosters", the FEU Cheerleaders are a supporting group for the school's varsity teams. They lead crowd participation at events both on and off campus.

FEU Drummers

The official cheer drummers of FEU. Initially part of the Cheering Squad, now under the FEU Center for the Arts, they are well trained in beating the drums. They mainly work together with the FEU Cheerleaders and FEU Cheerdancers in supporting their group and participates in school's varsity games.

== Other notable alumni athletes ==
Elma Muros-Posadas	Southeast Asian Games Gold Medalist
Haydee Coloso-Espino	Gold medalist (swimming), Asian Games 1954
Anthony Villanueva	Silver medalist 1964 Olympics (boxing)
Marestella Torres	23rd SEA Games gold medalist, 16th Asian Athletic Championships silver medalist (long jump)
Jayson Gonzales	22nd SEA Games gold medalist (chess)
Lerma Bulauitan	Gold medalist 2003 Asian Grand Prix (long jump)
Bernabe Lovina	Philippines Sportswriters Association awardee for track and field, 1950
Alberto T. Nogar Sr.	(Weightlifter) Bronze medalist 1958 Asian Games, 5th place 1958 World Weightlifting Championship, 8th place 1960 Olympics, 1960 Philippine Sportswriters Association weightlifter of the year
Ricardo Fortaleza	Gold medalist 6th Asian Games, silver medalist 1971 Asian Boxing Championship, Olympian 1972, Philippines Amateur Boxing of the Year 1970–1972, Araullo High School's most outstanding alumnus in sports 1993

== Retired jersey numbers ==
=== Basketball ===
- #14 – Johnny Abarrientos
- #19 – Arwind Santos

=== Volleyball ===
- #3 – Rachel Daquis (jersey retirement scheduled during the UAAP Season 79 women's volleyball tournament)

== Rankings in the UAAP ==
These are the rankings of the University in the UAAP events it is participating since 1986, the year the UAAP became an eight member-school league.

=== Seniors' events ===
Season	Basketball		Cheerdance	Volleyball		Beach volleyball		Badminton		Football		Track and field		Taekwondo			Chess		Table tennis		Fencing		Overall
	M	W	CDC	M	W	M	W	M	W	M	W	M	W	M	W	C	M	W	M	W	M	W	
68	1st	4th	3rd	1st	3rd	–	–	2nd	2nd	5th	3rd	1st	1st	3rd	4th	–	5th	4th	4th	2nd	2nd	5th	4th
69	5th	2nd	2nd	1st	2nd	1st	4th	1st	1st	2nd	1st	1st	1st	3rd	3rd	–	1st	2nd	1st	2nd	5th	5th	3rd
70	5th	5th	3rd	2nd	1st	1st	1st	3rd	2nd	1st	1st	1st	1st	1st	3rd	–	1st	4th	2nd	1st	3rd	5th	2nd
71	3rd	1st	3rd	6th	2nd	2nd	1st	4th	1st	2nd	3rd	1st	1st	3rd	2nd	–	1st	2nd	2nd	1st	4th	5th	4th
72	3rd	2nd	1st	2nd	5th	2nd	6th	3rd	2nd	1st	3rd	2nd	1st	1st	1st	–	1st	1st	1st	1st	4th	3rd	3rd
73	2nd	2nd	2nd	2nd	6th	1st	3rd	7th	1st	5th	1st	1st	1st	4th	2nd	–	1st	2nd	3rd	1st	4th	4th	4th
74	2nd	1st	3rd	1st	4th	1st	6th	4th	4th	3rd	3rd	1st	1st	3rd	1st	–	1st	4th	2nd	3rd	2nd	3rd	3rd
75	5th	1st	2nd	2nd	4th	2nd	8th	5th	2nd	3rd	1st	1st	1st	5th	3rd	–	2nd	3rd	3rd	3rd	5th	4th	4th
76	3rd	5th	4th	3rd	5th	5th	7th	6th	4th	1st	1st	1st	1st	5th	4th	4th	1st	3rd	2nd	4th	6th	3rd	5th
77	2nd	2nd	5th	5th	4th	4th	4th	8th	3rd	1st	1st	1st	2nd	5th	4th	4th	4th	1st	4th	3rd	5th	5th	5th
78	1st	8th	4th	5th	5th	4th	2nd	–	–	5th	4th	1st	2nd	6th	4th	4th	4th	2nd	3rd	2nd	4th	5th	5th
79	3rd	7th	2nd	3rd	4th	2nd	2nd	6th	6th	2nd	5th	1st	2nd	3rd	7th	4th	2nd	1st	6th	3rd	–	–	6th
80	4th	4th	4th	3rd	2nd	3rd	2nd	–	–	7th	3rd	1st	2nd	5th	7th	3rd	3rd	2nd	7th	3rd	–	–	7th
81	4th	2nd	2nd	2nd	4th	2nd	7th	–	–	4th	2nd	2nd	2nd	7th	7th	5th	1st	6th	3rd	4th	–	–	6th
82	4th	3rd	2nd			2nd	4th							7th	5th	5th	1st	1st					
83																							
84																							
85																							

Beach volleyball tournament in the 69th season was a demonstration event.

Poomsae became a regular event in the 76th season, was a demonstration sport in the 74th and 75th.

See FEU Baby Tamaraws for FEU Junior Rankings

== Championships tally ==
The University currently participates in 11 out of 16 events in the UAAP (as of UAAP Season 69). Total number of championships won in the UAAP seniors division include both men's and women's teams championships.

1st semester events	Total	2nd semester events	Total	Not participated this season	Total
Basketball	20	Football	13	Softball	19
Chess	2	Track and field	57	Tennis	7
Beach volleyball	4	Volleyball	72	Swimming	14
Taekwondo	1	Badminton	5		
Cheerdance	2	Fencing	1		
Table tennis	2				

The FEU Tamaraws were the first over-all league champions in the UAAP in 1948, making their first streak with 11 over-all championship titles which was later halted by the UST Growling Tigers in 1959. The FEU team last had their over-all UAAP championship title in 1982.

School	Juniors	Seniors	Total
University of Santo Tomas	10	35	45
Far Eastern University	0	16	16
University of the East	1	5	6
University of the Philippines	0	5	5
Ateneo de Manila University	2	0	2
National University	2	1	3
De La Salle University	0	1	1
Adamson University	0	0	0

See UAAP Overall Championship

== See also ==
- FEU – Diliman
