= Swimming Federation of India =

Sports governing body in India

- Sport: Aquatic sports
- Category: Swimming; Synchronized Swimming; Diving; High Diving; Water Polo
- Jurisdiction: India
- Membership: 30 associations
- Abbreviation: SFI
- Founded: 1948; 78 years ago
- Affiliation: World Aquatics
- Affiliation date: 1932 (Note: Affiliation received by the National Swimming Association, the SFI's predecessor.)
- Regional affiliation: Asia Aquatics
- Headquarters: Ahmedabad, Gujarat, India
- President: R N Jayprakash
- CEO: Virendra Nanavati
- Secretary: Chokshi Monal
- Replaced: National Swimming Association; Indian Swimming Federation

Official website
- swimming.org.in
- (India)

The Swimming Federation of India is the national governing body for aquatic sports in India. Legally, it is a non-profit association registered under the West Bengal Societies Registration Act, 1861. The federation holds elections for its office bearers every four years. The SFI currently oversees competition in the sports of swimming, masters swimming, synchronized swimming, diving, high diving, and water polo. It is affiliated to World Aquatics and Asia Aquatics.

The SFI was formed by the merger of the National Swimming Association and the Indian Swimming Federation in 1948. Prior to the merger, the NSA and ISF had been engaged in disputes. While the Calcutta-based NSA received affiliation from FINA in 1932–33, the ISF had the support of the Indian Olympic Association. The Union Government intervened to resolve the dispute by merging the two entities to form the SFI.

In July 2017, FINA presented a certificate to SFI CEO Virendra Nanavati during the 17th FINA World Championship in honour of his services to the discipline.

== Medal table ==
=== Swimming ===
Competition	Gold	Silver	Bronze	Total
Asian Games	1	2	6	9
Commonwealth Games	0	0	1	1
Total	1	2	7	10

=== Diving ===
Competition	Gold	Silver	Bronze	Total
Asian Games	2	1	2	5
Total	2	1	2	5

=== Water polo ===
Competition	Gold	Silver	Bronze	Total
Asian Games	1	1	1	3
Total	1	1	1	3

== See also ==
- List of Indian records in swimming
- Water polo in India
- Swimming in India
- Diving in India
- India men's national water polo team
- Arati Saha
- Mihir Sen
- Sachin Nag
- Brojen Das
- Shamsher Khan
- Bula Choudhury
- Virdhawal Khade
- Srihari Nataraj
- Sajan Prakash
