= Sajan Prakash =

Indian swimmer (born 1993)

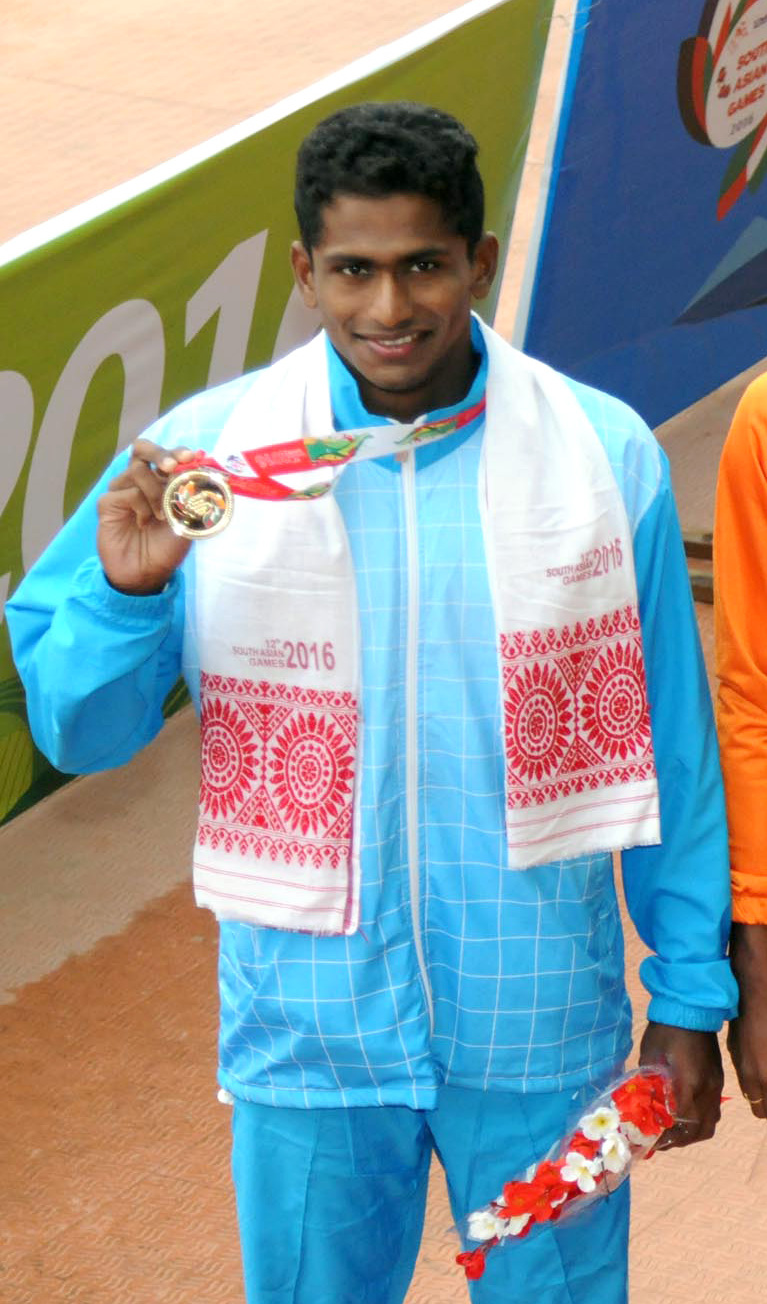
- Sajan at the 2016 South Asian Games

Personal information
- Born: 14 September 1993 (age 33) Idukki, Kerala, India
- Height: 1.78 m (5 ft 10 in)
- Weight: 70 kg (154 lb)

Sport
- Sport: Swimming
- Strokes: Freestyle, Butterfly, Medley
- Coach: Pradeep Kumar
Medal record
Men's swimming
Representing India
Asian Championships
Silver medal – second place	2025 Ahmedabad	4x200m freestyle
Bronze medal – third place	2025 Ahmedabad	200 m butterfly
AIMAG
Silver medal – second place	2017 Ashgabat	100 m butterfly
South Asian Games
Gold medal – first place	2016 Guwahati	200 m butterfly
Gold medal – first place	2016 Guwahati	1500 m freestyle
Gold medal – first place	2016 Guwahati	4x200m freestyle

Sajan Prakash (born 14 September 1993) is an Indian swimmer who specialises in freestyle, butterfly and medley events. He represented India at the 2016 Rio Olympics and the 2020 Tokyo Olympics in the 200 m butterfly event. He is the Indian national record holder in 200 m butterfly event with a time of 1:56.38. Sajan is currently training with Aqua Nation Sports Academy based in Dubai.

== Personal life ==
Sajan Prakash hails from Idukki district of Kerala. He was raised in Neyveli, Cuddalore district, Tamil Nadu. His mother V.J.Shantymol is also a former athlete and has represented India in several national and international events. He started training at the Neyveli Lignite City Swimming Club, Neyveli, Tamil Nadu. He did his schooling in St. Paul's Matriculation Higher Secondary School, NLC Boys Higher Secondary School, Jawahar Higher Secondary School, Neyveli, Tamil Nadu. He completed his graduation in computer applications from Annamalai University, Chidambaram. He later joined the Kerala Police as a Commanding Officer. A pool, named after him, was opened in Neyveli.

== Career ==
In the Sette Colli Trophy in Rome, Sajan Prakash made history as he became the first Indian swimmer, where he breached the Olympic qualification by just 10 milliseconds in the 200m butterfly event.

He won the gold medal in the men's 200m butterfly event at the FINA-accredited Olympic Qualifying event.

=== National Games ===
Sajan Prakash
Medal record
National Games of India
Gold medal – first place	2015 Kerala	100m butterfly
Gold medal – first place	2015 Kerala	200m butterfly
Gold medal – first place	2015 Kerala	400m freestyle
Gold medal – first place	2015 Kerala	800m freestyle
Gold medal – first place	2015 Kerala	1500m freestyle
Gold medal – first place	2015 Kerala	4x100m freestyle relay
Silver medal – second place	2015 Kerala	200m freestyle
Silver medal – second place	2015 Kerala	4x100m medley relay

=== Olympics ===
Sajan finished at 28th position in the 200m butterfly event at the 2016 Rio Olympics.

Sajan finished at 24th position in the 200m butterfly event at the 2020 Tokyo Olympics.

Sajan finished at 46th position in the 100m butterfly event at the 2020 Tokyo Olympics with a timing of 53:45.

=== Asian Games ===
At the 2018 Asian Games, Prakash participated in 100m and 200m butterfly, 4 × 200 m Freestyle Relay, and 4 × 100 m Freestyle Relay. Prakash finished at 5th position in 200m Butterfly clocking timing of 1:57.75 and in the 4 × 100 m Freestyle relay, he finished at 8th position in the finals.

=== Commonwealth Games ===
Prakash finished 8th in the finals of the 200m butterfly event at the 2018 Commonwealth Games.

== Achievements ==
- Won gold medal in 100m butterfly stroke and silver medal in 200m freestyle at 36th National Games held in Gujarat.
- Won 6 gold medals and 3 silver medals at the 35th National Games, held in Kerala India and won the Best Athlete award of 2015.
- Only Indian male swimmer to participate at the 2016 Rio Olympics.
- Won a silver medal in the 100m butterfly category at the 2017 Asian Indoor Games, held in Ashgabat, Turkmenistan.
- Holds 10 national, 3 South Asian and 1 Asian records in various categories.
- First Indian swimmer to qualify for finals at the 2018 Asian Games in 200m Butterfly in 32 years.
- First Indian swimmer to breach the FINA "A" Olympic qualification time.
- First Indian Swimmer to qualify for two consecutive Olympics.
