= India at the 2011 World Aquatics Championships =

Sporting event delegation

Flag of India

India competed at the 2011 World Aquatics Championships in Shanghai, China between July 16 and 31, 2011.

== Open water swimming ==
Men

Athlete	Event	Final	
Athlete	Event	Time	Position
Sufyan Shaikh	Men's 10km	OTL	
Mandar Divase	Men's 10km	2:12:15.8	54

== Swimming ==
India qualified 3 swimmers.

Men

Athlete	Event	Heats		Semifinals		Final	
Athlete	Event	Time	Rank	Time	Rank	Time	Rank
Virdhaval Vikram Khade	Men's 50m Freestyle	23.21	40	did not advance			
Virdhaval Vikram Khade	Men's 100m Freestyle	50.34	41	did not advance			
Virdhaval Vikram Khade	Men's 50m Butterfly	24.65	32	did not advance			
Ullalmath Gagan	Men's 800m Freestyle	8:21.90	42			did not advance	
Sandeep Sejwal	Men's 100m Breaststroke	1:02.62	49	did not advance			
