= India at the 1951 Asian Games =

- IOC code: IND
- NOC: Indian Olympic Association

in New Delhi
- Competitors: 151
- Medals Ranked 2nd: Gold 15 Silver 16 Bronze 20 Total 51

Asian Games appearances (overview)
- 1951; 1954; 1958; 1962; 1966; 1970; 1974; 1978; 1982; 1986; 1990; 1994; 1998; 2002; 2006; 2010; 2014; 2018; 2022; 2026

India hosted and participated in the 1951 Asian Games held in New Delhi from 4 to 11 March 1951, the inaugural edition of the Asian Games. India was ranked second with 15 gold medals, 16 silver medals and 20 bronze medals in the overall medal table, only behind Japan.

Kanti Shah won India's first-ever Asian Games medal with a silver in men's 100 m backstroke swimming. Sachin Nag won India's first-ever gold medal at the Asian Games in men's 100 m freestyle swimming. The India national football team won the gold medal in the men's football competition.

As of the conclusion of the 2022 Asian Games, 1951 remains the only edition where India won gold medals in diving, swimming and water polo. It also remains the only edition where India won any medals in cycling. India's 34 medals (10G, 12S, 12B) in athletics remains its best-ever performance at the Asian Games.

== Medal summary ==
=== Medals by sport ===
Medals by sport
Sport	Rank	Gold	Silver	Bronze	Total
Athletics	2	10	12	12	34
Diving	1	2	1	1	4
Swimming	3	1	1	4	6
Football	1	1	0	0	1
Water polo	1	1	0	0	1
Cycling	2	0	1	2	3
Weightlifting	3	0	1	1	2
Total	2	15	16	20	51

=== Medals by day ===
Medals by day
Day	Date	Gold	Silver	Bronze	Total
1	4 March	0	0	0	0
2	5 March	0	1	0	1
3	6 March	0	0	4	4
4	7 March	1	0	2	3
5	8 March	1	2	3	6
6	9 March	1	0	2	3
7	10 March	7	11	2	20
8	11 March	5	2	7	14
	Total	15	16	20	51

=== Medals by gender ===
Medals by gender
Gender	Gold	Silver	Bronze	Total
Male	15	14	15	44
Female	0	2	5	7
Total	15	16	20	51

=== Medalists ===
Medal	Name	Sport	Event	Date
Gold	Sachin Nag	Swimming	Men's 100 m freestyle	7 March
Gold	Mahabir Prasad	Athletics	Men's 10 km walk	8 March
Gold	Nikka Singh	Athletics	Men's 1500 m	9 March
Gold	Lavy Pinto	Athletics	Men's 200 m	10 March
Gold	Ranjit Singh	Athletics	Men's 800 m	10 March
Gold	Bakhtawar Singh	Athletics	Men's 50 km walk	10 March
Gold	Madan Lal	Athletics	Men's shot put	10 March
Gold	Amit Singh Bakshi; Govind Singh; Balwant Singh; Karnan Singh	Athletics	Men's 4 × 400 m relay	10 March
Gold	K. P. Thakkar	Diving	Men's 3 m springboard	10 March
Gold	India national football team: Berland Anthony Syed Khwaja Azizuddin A. M. Bachan Sunil Chatterjee Abhoy Ghosh D. N. Devine Jones Ahmed Khan G. Y. S. Laiq Sheikh Abdul Latif Loganathan Sailen Manna Sheoo Mewalal Santosh Nandy Muhammad Noor Chandan Singh Rawat P. B. A. Saleh Mohammad Abdus Sattar T. Shanmugham Runu Guha Thakurta Kenchappa Varadaraj Thenmaddom Varghese Pansanttom Venkatesh	Football	Men's team	10 March
Gold	Lavy Pinto	Athletics	Men's 100 m	11 March
Gold	Chhota Singh	Athletics	Men's marathon	11 March
Gold	Makhan Singh	Athletics	Men's discus throw	11 March
Gold	K. P. Thakkar	Diving	Men's 10 m platform	11 March
Gold	India men's national water polo team: Jahan Ahir Ganesh Das D. Daver R. Dean Isaac Mansoor G. Rattansey Kanti Shah	Water polo	Men's team	11 March
Silver	Kanti Shah	Swimming	Men's 100 m backstroke	5 March
Silver	Somnath Chopra	Athletics	Men's hammer throw	8 March
Silver	Kamineni Eswara Rao	Weightlifting	Men's middle heavyweight 90 kg	8 March
Silver	Marian Gabriel	Athletics	Men's 200 m	10 March
Silver	Kulwant Singh	Athletics	Men's 800 m	10 March
Silver	Pritam Singh	Athletics	Men's 5000 m	10 March
Silver	Teja Singh	Athletics	Men's 400 m hurdles	10 March
Silver	B. Das	Athletics	Men's 50 km walk	10 March
Silver	Baldev Singh	Athletics	Men's long jump	10 March
Silver	Parsa Singh	Athletics	Men's javelin throw	10 March
Silver	Roshan Mistry	Athletics	Women's 100 m	10 March
Silver	Mary D'Souza; Roshan Mistry; Banoo Gulzar; Pat Mendonca	Athletics	Women's 4×100 m relay	10 March
Silver	Dhangar Lhanguard; Raj Kumar Mehra; Madan Mohan; Gurdev Singh	Cycling	Men's 4000 m team pursuit	10 March
Silver	Ashu Dutt	Diving	Men's 3 m springboard	10 March
Silver	Amit Singh Bakshi	Athletics	Men's 400 m	11 March
Silver	Lavy Pinto; Marian Gabriel; Ram Swaroop; Alfred Shamin	Athletics	Men's 4×100 m relay	11 March
Bronze	Netai Chand Bysack	Cycling	Men's 1000 m time trial	6 March
Bronze	Jehangir Naegamwalla	Swimming	Men's 200 m breaststroke	6 March
Bronze	Isaac Mansoor; Bimal Chandra; Sambhu Saha; Sachin Nag	Swimming	Men's 4 x 100 m freestyle relay	6 March
Bronze	Dandamudi Rajagopal	Weightlifting	Men's heavyweight +90 kg	6 March
Bronze	Kanti Shah; Jehangir Naegamwalla; Sachin Nag	Swimming	Men's 3 x 100 m medley relay	7 March
Bronze	Bimal Chandra	Swimming	Men's 400 m freestyle	7 March
Bronze	Gurbachan Singh	Athletics	Men's 10000 m	8 March
Bronze	Kesar Singh	Athletics	Men's 10 km walk	8 March
Bronze	Kishen Singh	Athletics	Men's hammer throw	8 March
Bronze	Khurshid Ahmed	Athletics	Men's decathlon	9 March
Bronze	Rohinton Noble	Cycling	Men's 1000 m sprint	9 March
Bronze	Marie Semoes	Athletics	Women's high jump	10 March
Bronze	Barbara Webster	Athletics	Women's shot put	10 March
Bronze	Govind Singh	Athletics	Men's 400 m	11 March
Bronze	Ajit Singh	Athletics	Men's 3000 m steeplechase	11 March
Bronze	Surat Singh Mathur	Athletics	Men's marathon	11 March
Bronze	Mary D'Souza	Athletics	Women's 200 m	11 March
Bronze	Sylvia Gauntlet	Athletics	Women's long jump	11 March
Bronze	Barbara Webster	Athletics	Women's javelin throw	11 March
Bronze	T. T. Dand	Diving	Men's 10 m platform	11 March

== Aquatics ==
=== Diving ===
Athletes	Event	Final	
Athletes	Event	Result	Rank
K. P. Thakkar	Men's 3 m springboard	371.25	1st place, gold medalist(s)
Ashu Dutt	Men's 3 m springboard	327.20	2nd place, silver medalist(s)
K. P. Thakkar	Men's 10 m platform	362.05	1st place, gold medalist(s)
T. T. Dand	Men's 10 m platform	276.60	3rd place, bronze medalist(s)

=== Swimming ===
Athletes	Event	Heats		Final	
Athletes	Event	Result	Rank	Result	Rank
Sachin Nag	Men's 100 m freestyle	1:04.1	2 Q	1:04.7	1st place, gold medalist(s)
Isaac Mansoor	Men's 100 m freestyle	UK	2 Q	UK	6
Bimal Chandra	Men's 400 m freestyle	—N/a		5:32.5	3rd place, bronze medalist(s)
Santosh Bhattacharya	Men's 400 m freestyle	—N/a		UK	5
Bimal Chandra	Men's 800 m freestyle	—N/a		11:35.0	4
Santosh Bhattacharya	Men's 800 m freestyle	—N/a		14:15.0	6
Bimal Chandra	Men's 1500 m freestyle	—N/a		UK	5
Santosh Bhattacharya	Men's 1500 m freestyle	—N/a		DNF	
Kanti Shah	Men's 100 m backstroke	—N/a		1:17.0	2nd place, silver medalist(s)
Pratap Mitra	Men's 100 m backstroke	—N/a		UK	5
Jehangir Naegamwalla	Men's 200 m breaststroke	—N/a		3:11.0	3rd place, bronze medalist(s)
Bhubaneswar Pandey	Men's 200 m breaststroke	—N/a		3:14.1	6
Isaac Mansoor; Bimal Chandra; Sambhu Saha; Sachin Nag	Men's 4 x 100 m freestyle relay	—N/a		4:28.8	3rd place, bronze medalist(s)
Kanti Shah; Jehangir Naegamwalla; Sachin Nag	Men's 3 x 100 m medley relay	—N/a		3:43.6	3rd place, bronze medalist(s)

=== Water polo ===
Squad	Event	Final	Rank
India men's national water polo team Jahan Ahir; Ganesh Das; D. Daver; R. Dean; Isaac Mansoor; G. Rattansey; Kanti Shah	Men's team	Singapore; W 6–4	1st place, gold medalist(s)

==== Gold medal match ====
11 March	India	6–4	Singapore	National Stadium Swimming Pool, New Delhi
11 March	Scoring by half: 2–3, 4–1			National Stadium Swimming Pool, New Delhi
11 March	Shah, Dean 2	Goals	Sim 2	National Stadium Swimming Pool, New Delhi

== Athletics ==
=== Men ===
==== Track events ====
Athletes	Event	Heats		Semifinal		Final	
Athletes	Event	Result	Rank	Result	Rank	Result	Rank
Lavy Pinto	100 m	10.7	1 Q	11.0	1 Q	10.8	1st place, gold medalist(s)
Alfred Shamin	100 m	11.0	1 Q	11.2	2 Q	UK	4
Lavy Pinto	200 m	22.1	1 Q	—N/a		22.0	1st place, gold medalist(s)
Marian Gabriel	200 m	22.7	1 Q	—N/a		22.5	2nd place, silver medalist(s)
Amit Singh Bakshi	400 m	50.6	1 Q	—N/a		50.8	2nd place, silver medalist(s)
Govind Singh	400 m	UK	2 Q	—N/a		51.4	3rd place, bronze medalist(s)
Ranjit Singh	800 m	—N/a				1:59.3	1st place, gold medalist(s)
Kulwant Singh	800 m	—N/a				1:59.7	2nd place, silver medalist(s)
Nikka Singh	1500 m	—N/a				4:04.1	1st place, gold medalist(s)
Sadhu Singh	1500 m	—N/a				UK	5
Pritam Singh	5000 m	—N/a				15:57.8	2nd place, silver medalist(s)
Jang Singh	5000 m	—N/a				DNF	
Gurbachan Singh	10000 m	—N/a				34:58.8	3rd place, bronze medalist(s)
Gulzar Singh Mann	10000 m	—N/a				UK	4
Bagh Singh	110 m hurdles	UK	3 Q	—N/a		UK	5
Cleure D'Classe	110 m hurdles	UK	2 Q	—N/a		DNF	
Teja Singh	400 m hurdles	—N/a				56.9	2nd place, silver medalist(s)
Cleure D'Classe	400 m hurdles	—N/a				UK	4
Ajit Singh	3000 m steeplechase	—N/a				9:37.8	3rd place, bronze medalist(s)
Gulzar Singh Mann	3000 m steeplechase	—N/a				DNF	
Lavy Pinto; Marian Gabriel; Ram Swaroop; Alfred Shamin	4 x 100 m relay	43.0	1 Q	—N/a		42.8	2nd place, silver medalist(s)
Amit Singh Bakshi; Govind Singh; Balwant Singh; Karnan Singh	4 x 400 m relay	—N/a				3:24.2	1st place, gold medalist(s)

==== Field events ====
Athletes	Event	Qualification		Final	
Athletes	Event	Result	Rank	Result	Rank
Mehanga Singh Sidhu	High jump	1.83	UK Q	UK	4
K. Chatterjee	High jump	DSQ		—N/a	
Baldev Singh	Long jump	—N/a		6.99	2nd place, silver medalist(s)
Sohan Ram	Long jump	—N/a		UK	5
P. S. Cheema	Triple jump	—N/a		UK	6
P. Beck	Triple jump	—N/a		DSQ	
Makhan Singh	Discus throw	—N/a		39.92	1st place, gold medalist(s)
Amar Singh	Discus throw	—N/a		UK	4
Somnath Chopra	Hammer throw	—N/a		43.35	2nd place, silver medalist(s)
Kishen Singh	Hammer throw	—N/a		42.32	3rd place, bronze medalist(s)
Parsa Singh	Javelin throw	—N/a		50.38	2nd place, silver medalist(s)
Surat Singh	Javelin throw	—N/a		DSQ	
Khurshid Ahmed	Pole vault	—N/a		3.61	4
S. Chakravarty	Pole vault	—N/a		DSQ	
Madan Lal	Shot put	—N/a		13.78	1st place, gold medalist(s)
Ishar Singh	Shot put	—N/a		UK	5

==== Road events ====
Athletes	Event	Final	
Athletes	Event	Result	Rank
Chhota Singh	Marathon	2:42:58.6	1st place, gold medalist(s)
Surat Singh Mathur	Marathon	2:53:49.8	3rd place, bronze medalist(s)
Mahabir Prasad	10 km walk	52:31.4	1st place, gold medalist(s)
Kesar Singh	10 km walk	52:54.0	3rd place, bronze medalist(s)
Bakhtawar Singh	50 km walk	5:44:07.4	1st place, gold medalist(s)
B. Das	50 km walk	5:44:14.6	2nd place, silver medalist(s)

==== Combined events ====
Athlete	Event	Category	100 m	LJ	SP	HJ	400 m	110H	DT	PV	JT	1500 m	Total	Rank
Khurshid Ahmed	Decathlon	Result	12.0	6.11	9.07	1.47	55.2	17.4	27.95	3.36	46.93	5:17.2	5110	3rd place, bronze medalist(s)
Khurshid Ahmed	Decathlon	Points	651	610	430	367	591	583	424	446	543	465	5110	3rd place, bronze medalist(s)
Gurnam Singh	Decathlon	Result	12.5	5.66	11.46	1.62	DNP						2124	DSQ
Gurnam Singh	Decathlon	Points	566	514	574	480	DNP						2124	DSQ

=== Women ===
==== Track events ====
Athletes	Event	Heats		Final	
Athletes	Event	Result	Rank	Result	Rank
Roshan Mistry	100 m	12.9	2 Q	12.8	2nd place, silver medalist(s)
Pat Mendonca	100 m	13.1	2 Q	UK	4
Mary D'Souza	200 m	—N/a		28.0	3rd place, bronze medalist(s)
Banoo Gulzar	200 m	—N/a		UK	4
Nilima Ghose	80 m hurdles	—N/a		UK	5
Violet Peters	80 m hurdles	—N/a		UK	6
Mary D'Souza; Roshan Mistry; Banoo Gulzar; Pat Mendonca	4 x 100 m relay	—N/a		51.9	2nd place, silver medalist(s)

==== Field events ====
Athletes	Event	Final	
Athletes	Event	Result	Rank
Marie Semoes	High jump	1.37	3rd place, bronze medalist(s)
Marjorie Soares	High jump	1.37	4
Sylvia Gauntlet	Long jump	4.52	3rd place, bronze medalist(s)
Veronica Game	Long jump	UK	4
Bhagi Thadani	Discus throw	UK	4
Barbara Webster	Discus throw	UK	5
Barbara Webster	Javelin throw	26.70	3rd place, bronze medalist(s)
Bhagi Thadani	Javelin throw	UK	5
Barbara Webster	Shot put	9.02	3rd place, bronze medalist(s)
Usha Rajaram	Shot put	UK	4

== Basketball ==
Squad	Event	Round robin	Rank
India men's national basketball team Ranbir Chopra (C); Davinder Nath Bahri; Dharampal Chum; Ram Prakash; Avnish Chander Soni; Gur Prasad; Lakshmi; S. V. Appayya; Kapoor	Men's team	Iran; L 52–63	4
India men's national basketball team Ranbir Chopra (C); Davinder Nath Bahri; Dharampal Chum; Ram Prakash; Avnish Chander Soni; Gur Prasad; Lakshmi; S. V. Appayya; Kapoor	Men's team	Japan; L 46–70	4
India men's national basketball team Ranbir Chopra (C); Davinder Nath Bahri; Dharampal Chum; Ram Prakash; Avnish Chander Soni; Gur Prasad; Lakshmi; S. V. Appayya; Kapoor	Men's team	Burma; W 50–47	4
India men's national basketball team Ranbir Chopra (C); Davinder Nath Bahri; Dharampal Chum; Ram Prakash; Avnish Chander Soni; Gur Prasad; Lakshmi; S. V. Appayya; Kapoor	Men's team	Philippines; L 38–86	4

== Cycling ==
Athlete	Event	Time	Rank
Netai Chand Bysack	Men's 1000 m time trial	1:22.2	3rd place, bronze medalist(s)
Suprovat Chakravarty	Men's 1000 m time trial	1:22.9	4
Rohinton Noble	Men's 1000 m sprint	UK	3rd place, bronze medalist(s)
Bapoo Malcolm Sr.	Men's 1000 m sprint	UK	4
Dhangar Lhanguard; Raj Kumar Mehra; Madan Mohan; Gurdev Singh	Men's 4000 m team pursuit	UK	2nd place, silver medalist(s)

== Football ==
=== Summary ===
Team	Event	Quarterfinal	Semifinal	Final / BM	
Team	Event	Opposition Score	Opposition Score	Opposition Score	Rank
India	Men's team	Indonesia; W 3–0	Afghanistan; W 3–0	Iran; W 1–0	1st place, gold medalist(s)

=== Roster ===
Coach: (India) Syed Abdul Rahim

No.	Pos.	Player	Date of birth (age)	Club
	GK	Berland Anthony		(All India Football Federation) Bengal
	DF	Thenmaddom Varghese		(All India Football Federation) Bombay
	DF	Sailen Manna (c)	1 September 1924 (aged 26)	(All India Football Federation) Mohun Bagan
	MF	Sheikh Abdul Latif	15 August 1928 (aged 22)	(All India Football Federation) Mohammedan Sporting
	DF	Chandan Singh Rawat	26 July 1928 (aged 22)	(All India Football Federation) Services
	MF	Noor Mohammed		(All India Football Federation) Hyderabad City Police
	FW	Pansanttom Venkatesh		(All India Football Federation) East Bengal
	FW	Sahu Mewalal	1 July 1926 (aged 24)	(All India Football Federation) Eastern Railway
	FW	Ahmed Khan	24 December 1926 (aged 24)	(All India Football Federation) Bengal
	FW	P. B. A. Saleh	28 November 1928 (aged 22)	(All India Football Federation) Bengal
	GK	Kenchappa Varadaraj	7 May 1924 (aged 26)	(All India Football Federation) Mysore
	MF	Thulukhanam Shanmugham	19 June 1920 (aged 30)	(All India Football Federation) Mysore
	FW	Santosh Nandy		(All India Football Federation) Bengal
	DF	Syed Khwaja Azizuddin	12 July 1930 (aged 20)	(All India Football Federation) Hyderabad City Police
	DF	Sunil Chatterjee		(All India Football Federation) Bengal
	MF	Abhoy Ghosh		(All India Football Federation) Bengal
	MF	Desmond Neville Devine-Jones	15 August 1928 (aged 22)	(All India Football Federation) Services
	FW	G. Y. S. Laiq		(All India Football Federation) Hyderabad City Police
	FW	Loganathan		(All India Football Federation) Madras
	FW	Madar Abdus Sattar		(All India Football Federation) Bengal
	FW	Runu Guha Thakurta		(All India Football Federation) Bengal
	FW	Abdul Majid Bachan		(All India Football Federation) Orissa

=== Quarterfinals ===
5 March 1951
16:15

India	3–0	Indonesia
Mewalal 27'; Siregar 42' (o.g.); Venkatesh 45'	Report

National Stadium, New Delhi

=== Semifinals ===
7 March 1951
16:15

India	3–0	Afghanistan
Venkatesh 10'; Mewalal 16'; Nandy 55'	Report

National Stadium, New Delhi

=== Gold medal match ===
10 March 1951
17:00

India	1–0	Iran
Mewalal 34'	Report

National Stadium, New Delhi

All times are India Standard Time (UTC+05:00)

== Weightlifting ==
Athlete	Event	Clean & press		Snatch		Clean & jerk		Total (lb)	Rank
Athlete	Event	Result (lb)	Rank	Result (lb)	Rank	Result (lb)	Rank	Total (lb)	Rank
R. Desai	Men's bantamweight 56 kg	145	6	160	6	210	6	515	6
V. W. Phenany	Men's bantamweight 56 kg	125	7	160	6	195	7	480	7
G. Sethuraman	Men's featherweight 60 kg	190	4	185	2	270	1	645	4
B. N. Ghosh	Men's lightweight 67.5 kg	175	5	170	6	245	4	590	5
Daniel Pon Mani	Men's lightweight 67.5 kg	210	1	200	2	-	DNF	410	DNF
J. D. Telang	Men's light heavyweight 82.5 kg	190	4	180	4	250	3	620	4
N. K. Nair	Men's light heavyweight 82.5 kg	180	5	170	5	220	4	570	5
Kamineni Eswara Rao	Men's middle heavyweight 90 kg	200	2	205	2	250	3	655	2nd place, silver medalist(s)
Dandamudi Rajagopal	Men's heavyweight +90 kg	220	2	210	3	295	2	725	3rd place, bronze medalist(s)
