= Athletics at the 1951 Asian Games =

Sport from the Asian Games

- Venue: National Stadium
- Dates: 8–11 March 1951
- Nations: 11

Athletics was contested at the 1951 Asian Games in National Stadium, New Delhi, India from 8 March to 11 March 1951.

== Medalists ==
=== Men ===
Event	Gold		Silver		Bronze	
100 m	Lavy Pinto; India	10.8	Toshihiro Ohashi; Japan	11.0	Tomio Hosoda; Japan	11.1
200 m	Lavy Pinto; India	22.0; GR	Marian Gabriel; India	22.5	Tomio Hosoda; Japan	22.6
400 m	Eitaro Okano; Japan	50.7	Amit Singh Bakshi; India	50.8	Govind Singh; India	51.4
800 m	Ranjit Singh; India	1:59.3; GR	Kulwant Singh; India	1:59.7	Kikuo Moriya; Japan	2:00.6
1500 m	Nikka Singh; India	4:04.1; GR	Susumu Takahashi; Japan	4:04.4	Kikuo Moriya; Japan	4:05.4
5000 m	Ali Baghbanbashi; Iran	15:54.2; GR	Pritam Singh; India	15:57.8	Soichi Tamoi; Japan	15:59.0
10,000 m	Soichi Tamoi; Japan	33:49.6; GR	Ryosuke Takasugi; Japan	34:32.0	Gurbachan Singh; India	34:58.7
110 m hurdles	Ng Liang Chiang; Singapore	15.2; GR	Michitaka Kinami; Japan	15.3	Lloyd Valberg; Singapore	15.7
400 m hurdles	Eitaro Okano; Japan	54.2; GR	Teja Singh; India	56.9	Ng Liang Chiang; Singapore	57.6
3000 m steeplechase	Susumu Takahashi; Japan	9:30.4; GR	Ali Baghbanbashi; Iran	9:31.8	Ajit Singh; India	9:37.8
4 × 100 m relay	Japan; Masaji Tajima; Toshihiro Ohashi; Tomio Hosoda; Kazuta Ikoma	42.7; GR	India; Alfred Shamin; Ram Swaroop; Marian Gabriel; Lavy Pinto	42.8	Philippines; Bernabe Lovina; Jovencio Ardina; Tito Almagro; Genaro Cabrera	43.9
4 × 400 m relay	India; Govind Singh; Amit Singh Bakshi; Balwant Singh; Karan Singh	3:24.2; GR	Japan; Yorio Mizuyoke; Ichiro Tao; Fumio Nishiuchi; Eitaro Okano	3:24.4	Philippines; Bernabe Lovina; Bienvenido Llaneta; Tomas Bennet; Genaro Cabrera	3:35.8
Marathon	Chhota Singh; India	2:42:58.6; GR	Katsuo Nishida; Japan	2:49:03.0	Surat Mathur; India	2:53:49.8
10,000 m walk	Mahabir Prasad; India	52:31.4; GR	Takeo Sato; Japan	52:34.8	Kesar Singh; India	52:54.0
50 km walk	Bakhtawar Singh; India	5:44:07.4; GR	B. Das; India	5:44:14.6	Takeo Sato; Japan	5:54:47.4
High jump	Andres Franco; Philippines	1.93; GR	Yukio Ishikawa; Japan	1.91	Maram Sudarmodjo; Indonesia	1.89
Pole vault	Bunkichi Sawada; Japan	4.11; GR	M. A. Akbar; Ceylon	3.69	Shuhei Nishida; Japan	3.61
Long jump	Masaji Tajima; Japan	7.14; GR	Baldev Singh; India	6.99	Takashi Aso; Japan	6.98
Triple jump	Yoshio Iimuro; Japan	15.18; GR	Takashi Aso; Japan	14.25	Hendarsin; Indonesia	14.24
Shot put	Madan Lal; India	13.78; GR	Sukeo Denda; Japan	13.40	Norimi Sato; Japan	12.83
Discus throw	Makhan Singh; India	39.92; GR	Norimi Sato; Japan	39.29	Aurelio Amante; Philippines	38.14
Hammer throw	Fumio Kamamoto; Japan	46.65; GR	Somnath Chopra; India	43.35	Kishen Singh; India	42.32
Javelin throw	Haruo Nagayasu; Japan	63.97; GR	Parsa Singh; India	50.38	Matulessy; Indonesia	48.99
Decathlon	Fumio Nishiuchi; Japan	6324; GR	Bunkichi Sawada; Japan	5860	Khurshid Ahmed; India	5099

=== Women ===
Event	Gold		Silver		Bronze	
100 m	Kiyoko Sugimura; Japan	12.6	Roshan Mistry; India	12.8	Kimiko Okamoto; Japan	12.9
200 m	Kimiko Okamoto; Japan	26.0; GR	Laura Dowdswell; Singapore	27.2	Mary D'Souza; India	28.0
80 m hurdles	Kyoko Yoneda; Japan	12.8; GR	Laura Dowdswell; Singapore	13.2	Taeko Sato; Japan	13.5
4 × 100 m relay	Japan; Kimiko Okamoto; Taeko Sato; Ayako Yoshikawa; Kiyoko Sugimura	51.4; GR	India; Banoo Gulzar; Mary D'Souza; Pat Mendonca; Roshan Mistry	51.9	Indonesia; Surjowati; Triwulan; Darwati; Lie Djiang Nio	54.4
High jump	Kyoko Yoneda; Japan	1.49; GR	Taeko Sato; Japan	1.44	Marie Semoes; India	1.37
Long jump	Kiyoko Sugimura; Japan	5.91; GR	Ayako Yoshikawa; Japan	5.18	Sylvia Gauntlet; India	4.52
Shot put	Toyoko Yoshino; Japan	11.90; GR	Fumi Kojima; Japan	10.42	Barbara Webster; India	9.02
Discus throw	Toyoko Yoshino; Japan	42.10; GR	Fumi Kojima; Japan	35.51	Annie Salamun; Indonesia	25.43
Javelin throw	Toyoko Yoshino; Japan	36.23; GR	Miyoko Kato; Japan	35.33	Barbara Webster; India	26.70

== Medal table ==
Rank	Nation	Gold	Silver	Bronze	Total
1	Japan (JPN)	20	17	11	48
2	India (IND)	10	12	12	34
3	Singapore (SIN)	1	2	2	5
4	Iran (IRN)	1	1	0	2
5	Philippines (PHI)	1	0	3	4
6	Ceylon (CEY)	0	1	0	1
7	Indonesia (INA)	0	0	5	5
Totals (7 entries)		33	33	33	99

== Participating nations ==
- Afghanistan
- Burma
- Ceylon
- India (52)
- Indonesia (17)
- Iran (8)
- Japan
- Nepal
- Philippines
- Singapore
- Thailand
