= Japan at the 1951 Asian Games =

- IOC code: JPN
- NOC: Japanese Olympic Committee

in New Delhi
- Competitors: 65 (58 men, 7 women)
- Medals Ranked 1st: Gold 24 Silver 21 Bronze 15 Total 60

Asian Games appearances (overview)
- 1951; 1954; 1958; 1962; 1966; 1970; 1974; 1978; 1982; 1986; 1990; 1994; 1998; 2002; 2006; 2010; 2014; 2018; 2022; 2026

Japan participated in the 1951 Asian Games held in the capital city of New Delhi, India. The nation sent a total of 65 athletes to the games, 58 men and 7 women.

Japan was ranked 1st with 24 gold medals, 21 silver medals and 15 bronze medals with a total of 60 medals to secure its top spot in the medal tally. Athletics was the most successful sport with 20 gold medals, 17 silver medals and 15 bronze medals. Female athletes won all nine events with Kiyoko Sugimura and Toyoko Yoshino became the most successful Japanese athletes in the games after collecting 3 gold medals each.

The cyclists collected four gold medals, three silver medals and a bronze medal. Japanese road cyclists consisting of Kihei Tomioka, Yuji Tachiiri, and Takeo Sato swept the road race medals. Tomioka, Tachiiri, and Sato, along with Ryo Ishikawa also won the team pursuit gold medal. Sato became the most successful cyclist after winning two gold medals and a bronze, including the men's sprint gold medal. In the 1 km time trial, Shoichiro Sugihara won the gold medal, making every Japanese cyclist collect at least one gold medal from the games.

== Medalists ==
| Medal | Name | Sport | Event | Date |
|---|---|---|---|---|
| Gold | Kihei Tomioka | Cycling | Men's road race | March 6 |
| Gold | Takeo Sato | Cycling | Men's sprint | March 7 |
| Gold | Shoichiro Sugihara | Cycling | Men's 1 km time trial | March 7 |
| Gold | Ryo Ishikawa; Takeo Sato; Yuji Tachiiri; Kihei Tomioka | Cycling | Men's team pursuit | March 8 |
| Gold | Fumio Kamamoto | Athletics | Men's hammer throw | March 8 |
| Gold | Bunkichi Sawada | Athletics | Men's pole vault | March 8 |
| Gold | Soichi Tamoi | Athletics | Men's 10,000 m | March 8 |
| Gold | Toyoko Yoshino | Athletics | Women's discus throw | March 9 |
| Gold | Fumio Nishiuchi | Athletics | Men's decathlon | March 9 |
| Gold | Kyoko Yoneda | Athletics | Women's high jump | March 10 |
| Gold | Haruo Nagayasu | Athletics | Men's javelin throw | March 10 |
| Gold | Masaji Tajima | Athletics | Men's long jump | March 10 |
| Gold | Toyoko Yoshino | Athletics | Women's shot put | March 10 |
| Gold | Eitaro Okano | Athletics | Men's 400 m hurdles | March 10 |
| Gold | Kiyoko Sugimura | Athletics | Women's 100 m | March 10 |
| Gold | Kiyoko Sugimura | Athletics | Women's long jump | March 11 |
| Gold | Yoshio Iimura | Athletics | Men's triple jump | March 11 |
| Gold | Eitaro Okano | Athletics | Men's 400 m | March 11 |
| Gold | Susumu Takahashi | Athletics | Men's 3000 m steeplechase | March 11 |
| Gold | Kyoko Yoneda | Athletics | Women's 80 m hurdles | March 11 |
| Gold | Kimiko Okamoto | Athletics | Women's 200 m | March 11 |
| Gold | Kimiko Okamoto; Taeko Sato; Ayako Yoshikawa; Kiyoko Sugimura | Athletics | Women's 4x100 m relay | March 11 |
| Gold | Masaji Tajima; Toshihiro Ohashi; Tomio Hosoda; Kazuta Ikoma | Athletics | Men's 4x100 m relay | March 11 |
| Gold | Toyoko Yoshino | Athletics | Women's javelin throw | unknown |
| Silver | Yuji Tachiiri | Cycling | Men's road race | March 6 |
| Silver | Shoichiro Sugihara | Cycling | Men's sprint | March 7 |
| Silver | Ryo Ishikawa | Cycling | Men's 1 km time trial | March 7 |
| Silver | Takeo Sato | Athletics | Men's 10,000 m walk | March 8 |
| Silver | Ryosuke Takasugu | Athletics | Men's 10,000 m | March 8 |
| Silver | Fumi Kojima | Athletics | Women's discus throw | March 9 |
| Silver | Susumu Takahashi | Athletics | Men's 1500 m | March 9 |
| Silver | Bunkichi Sawada | Athletics | Men's decathlon | March 9 |
| Silver | Taeko Sato | Athletics | Women's high jump | March 10 |
| Silver | Fumi Kojima | Athletics | Women's shot put | March 10 |
| Silver | Sukeo Denda | Athletics | Men's shot put | March 10 |
| Silver | Makoto Arai; Mitsugu Hachiya; Hiroshi Ikeda; Junichi Iwao; Michio Katayama; Fumio Matsuoka; Kasaburo Ogura; Shuzo Okubo; Shigeru Saito; Minoru Takahashi; Mitsuhide Tsuji | Basketball | Men's tournament | March 10 |
| Silver | Norimi Sato | Athletics | Men's discus throw | March 11 |
| Silver | Ayako Yoshikawa | Athletics | Women's long jump | March 11 |
| Silver | Takashi Aso | Athletics | Men's triple jump | March 11 |
| Silver | Toshihiro Ohashi | Athletics | Men's 100 m | March 11 |
| Silver | Michitaka Kinami | Athletics | Men's 110 m hurdles | March 11 |
| Silver | Katsuo Nishida | Athletics | Men's marathon | March 11 |
| Silver | Yukio Ishikawa | Athletics | Men's high jump | March 11 |
| Silver | Yorio Mizuyoke; Ichiro Tao; Fumio Nishiuchi; Eitaro Okano | Athletics | Men's 4x400 m relay | March 11 |
| Silver | Miyoko Kato | Athletics | Women's javelin throw | unknown |
| Bronze | Takeo Sato | Cycling | Men's road race | March 6 |
| Bronze | Yukio Iguchi | Weightlifting | Men's 60 kg | March 6 |
| Bronze | Minoru Kubota | Weightlifting | Men's 67.5 kg | March 6 |
| Bronze | Takeo Sato | Athletics | Men's 50 km walk | March 8 |
| Bronze | Shuhei Nishida | Athletics | Men's pole vault | March 8 |
| Bronze | Kikuo Moriya | Athletics | Men's 1500 m | March 9 |
| Bronze | Ko Arima; Toshio Iwatani; Taro Kagawa; Takashi Kano; Nobuyuki Kato; Seki Matsunaga; Koji Miyata; Hirokazu Ninomiya; Ken Noritake; Yoshio Okada; Shigeo Sugimoto; Megumu Tamura; Masanori Tokita; Yukio Tsuda | Football | Men's tournament | March 9 |
| Bronze | Takashi Aso | Athletics | Men's long jump | March 10 |
| Bronze | Norimi Sato | Athletics | Men's shot put | March 10 |
| Bronze | Soichi Tamoi | Athletics | Men's 5000 m | March 10 |
| Bronze | Kikuo Moriya | Athletics | Men's 800 m | March 10 |
| Bronze | Tomio Hosoda | Athletics | Men's 200 m | March 10 |
| Bronze | Kimiko Okamoto | Athletics | Women's 100 m | March 10 |
| Bronze | Taeko Sato | Athletics | Women's 80 m hurdles | March 11 |
| Bronze | Tomio Hosoda | Athletics | Men's 100 m | March 11 |

Medals by sport
| Sport | 1st place, gold medalist(s) | 2nd place, silver medalist(s) | 3rd place, bronze medalist(s) | Total |
| Athletics | 20 | 17 | 11 | 48 |
| Cycling | 4 | 3 | 1 | 8 |
| Basketball | 0 | 1 | 0 | 1 |
| Weightlifting | 0 | 0 | 2 | 2 |
| Football | 0 | 0 | 1 | 1 |
| Total | 24 | 21 | 15 | 60 |

== See also ==
- Japan at the 1952 Summer Olympics
