= Christine Brown =

Indian track and field athlete

Personal information
- Full name: Christine Brown
- Nationality: Indian
- Born: Bombay, British India
- Education: Baldwin Girls' High School

Sport
- Country: India
- Sport: Athletics
- Events: Long Jump, 100m Sprints, 110m hurdles
Medal record
Women's athletics
Representing India
Asian Games
Gold medal – first place	1954 Manila	4×100 m
Bronze medal – third place	1954 Manila	100 m
Bronze medal – third place	1958 Tokyo	4×100 m

Christine Brown (born September 1938) is an Indian track-and-field athlete. She won a gold medal in 4×100m relay (with Stephie d'Souza, Violet Peters and Mary d'Souza) and bronze in the 100 metres in the 1954 Asian Games. This was the first gold by an Indian women's team at the Asian Games. Mary D'Souza, Pat Mendonca, Banoo Gulzar and Roshan Mistry had won a silver in the same event in 1951.

In the inter school athletics competition in Bangalore in 1953 Brown, then a fifteen year old student of Baldwin Girls High School, broke the national long jump record with a jump of 17' 4" and equaled the 100m record of 12.4 seconds. She belonged to an Anglo-Indian family from Bombay.
