= Pat Mendonca =

Indian sprinter

Personal information
- Nationality: Indian

Sport
- Country: India
- Sport: Athletics
Medal record
Women's athletics
Representing India
Asian Games
Silver medal – second place	1951 New Delhi	4×100 m

Pat Mendonca is an Indian athlete. She won a Silver medal in the 4 × 100 m relay at the 1951 Asian Games along with Roshan Mistry, Banoo Gulzar and her cousin Mary D'Souza.
