= Cycling at the 1951 Asian Games =

- Dates: 6–8 March 1951
- Nations: 4

Cycling was contested at the 1951 Asian Games in New Delhi, India from 6 to 8 March. Cyclists from four countries, India, Japan, Iran and Burma, participated in this sport. Japanese cyclists won gold in each of the four events contested. They also won the silver in three of the four events.

1951 Asiad cyclists

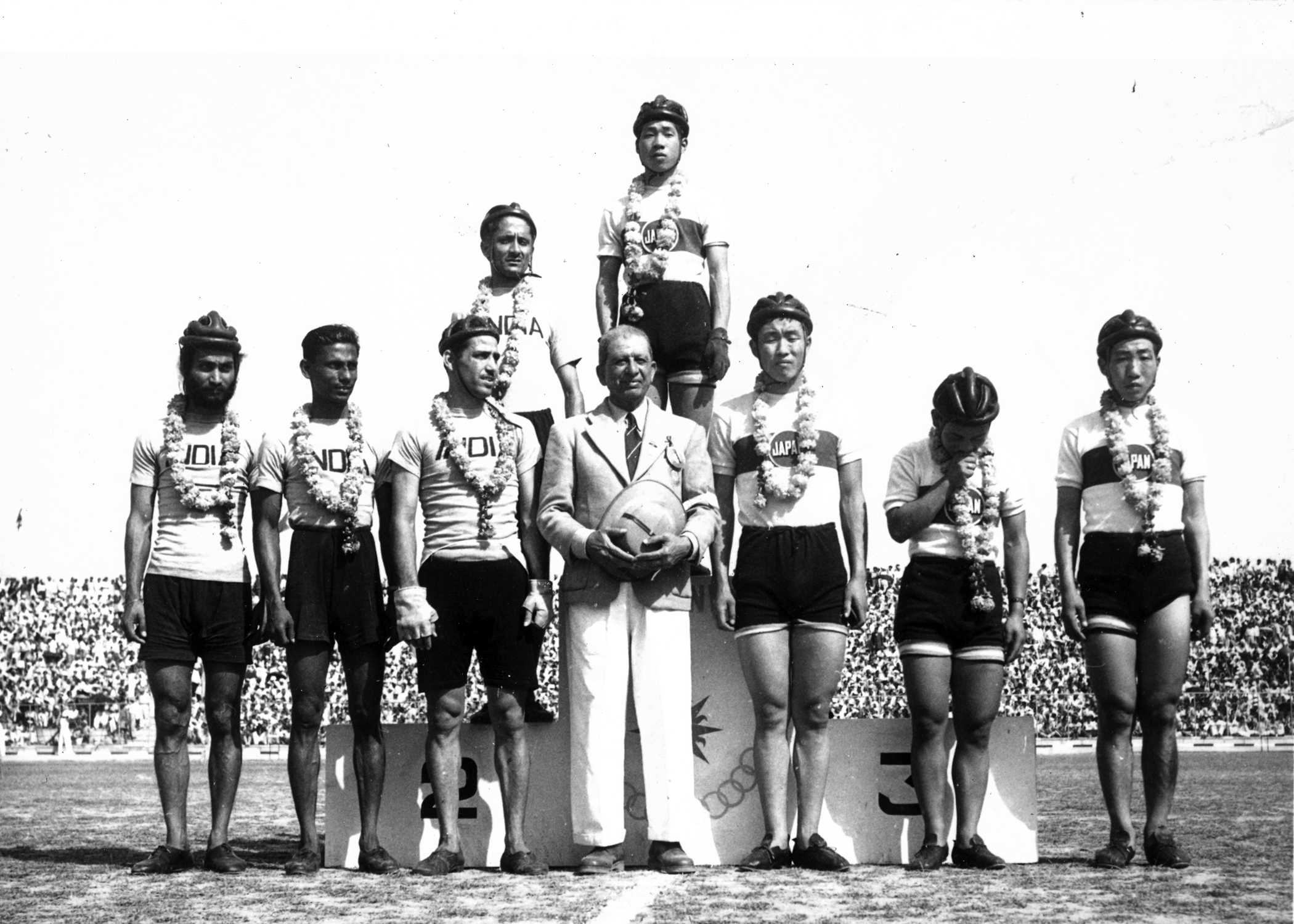
1951 Asiad team pursuit medalists

== Medalists ==
=== Road ===
Event	Gold	Silver	Bronze
Road race	Kihei Tomioka; Japan	Yuji Tachiiri; Japan	Takeo Sato; Japan

=== Track ===
Event	Gold	Silver	Bronze
Sprint	Takeo Sato; Japan	Shoichiro Sugihara; Japan	Rohinton Noble; India
1 km time trial	Shoichiro Sugihara; Japan	Ryo Ishikawa; Japan	Netai Chand Bysack; India
Team pursuit	Japan; Ryo Ishikawa; Takeo Sato; Yuji Tachiiri; Kihei Tomioka	India; Dhangar; Raj Kumar Mehra; Madan Mohan; Gurdev Singh	None awarded

== Medal table ==
Rank	Nation	Gold	Silver	Bronze	Total
1	Japan (JPN)	4	3	1	8
2	India (IND)	0	1	2	3
Totals (2 entries)		4	4	3	11
