= Surat Mathur =

Indian long-distance runner (1930–2021)

Personal information
- Nationality: Indian
- Born: Surat Singh Mathur; 22 August 1930 Delhi, India
- Died: 11 June 2021 (aged 90) Delhi, India

Sport
- Sport: Long-distance running
- Event: Marathon
Medal record
Men's athletics
Representing India
Asian Games
Bronze medal – third place	1951 New Delhi	Marathon

Surat Mathur (22 August 1930 – 11 June 2021) was an Indian long-distance runner. He competed in the marathon at the 1952 Summer Olympics. He also won a bronze medal at the 1951 Asian Games.

Mathur died from COVID-19 in 2021.
