= Taghi Asgari =

Iranian diver

Sport
- Sport: Diving
Medal record
Men's diving
Representing Iran
Asian Games
Silver medal – second place	1951 New Delhi	10 m platform
Bronze medal – third place	1951 New Delhi	3 m springboard

Taghi Asgari also spelt as Taghi Askari is an Iranian diver. He rose to prominence and limelight, garnering huge widespread media attention for his age-defying exhibition dive at the age of 100 years during the 2024 World Aquatics Championships and for taking part as the oldest competitor at the 2024 World Aquatics Masters Championships.

== Biography ==
Asgari has actively engaged in diving since his teenage years. He first witnessed diving at a swimming pool near his childhood home in Iran, where other children were apparently somersaulting into the water. He then began to learn to swim and jump into the water. For him, it was the turning point in his life, and the moment became the tip of the iceberg as far as he was concerned, which apparently turned out to be a source of inspiration and sparked a lifelong love of diving in him.

== Career ==
Asgari made his Asian Games debut in the inaugural edition of the multi-sport event in 1951 which was held in New Delhi and he competed in the men's diving competitions. Representing Iran at the 1951 Asian Games, he had a memorable Asian Games debut as he went onto claim a silver and a bronze medal in the men's diving competitions. His silver medal performance came in the Men's 10 m platform event and his bronze medal achievement came in the Men's 3 m springboard event. Surprisingly, only two nations including hosts India and Iran entered the diving competitions during the 1951 Asian Games.

In an exclusive interview with World Aquatics, he insisted that he had decided to bid adieu to the sport of diving in 1983 at the age of 41, when he signed off with a gold medal as the national champion at the 1983 Iranian National Diving Championships. He confirmed to the World Aquatics that he will be returning to the sport after a long hiatus (60 years) and revealed his keen interest to take part at the 2024 World Aquatics Masters Championships. He was the center of attention and received substantial significant media coverage during the course of the 2024 World Aquatics Masters Championships, as he defied the odds and broke the stereotypes pertaining to the age factor by participating in the World Aquatics Masters Championships at the age of 100, to become the oldest competitor in the history of the competition. He stood on the springboard and dived into the waters to perform a one metre dive and he was honored with a gold medal which was presented by the World Aquatics President Husain Al-Musallam. At least, two weeks prior to the scheduled 2024 World Aquatics Masters Championships, he also performed an exhibition drive during the 2024 World Aquatics Championships. He was also overwhelmed with a lot of crowd support cheering for him after performing an exhibition dive during the 2024 World Aquatics Championships, and he broke down with tears in an emotional manner after having made a comeback to the sport, which he pursued during his teenage years.
