= Andres Franco (high jumper) =

Filipino high jumper (1925–2008)

Andrés Franco
Personal information
- National team: Philippines
- Born: Andrés Tan Franco; November 30, 1925 Tondo, Manila, Philippine Islands
- Died: February 9, 2008 (aged 82) Manila, Philippines
- Height: 6 ft 0 in (183 cm)

Sport
- Country: Philippines
- Sport: Track and field
Medal record
Men's athletics
Representing Philippines
Asian Games
Gold medal – first place	1951 New Delhi	High jump
Bronze medal – third place	1954 Manila	High jump
- Updated on February 21, 2016

Andrés Tan Franco (November 30, 1925 – February 9, 2008) was a Filipino former high jumper who competed in the 1952 Summer Olympics.

== Early life ==
Franco was born on 30 November 1925 in Tondo, Manila to Sabina Tan and Agaton Franco. He is the youngest among 6 siblings. He had four sisters and one older brother. Franco is of Spanish and Chinese descent.

== Sporting career ==
The highlight of Franco's career was his participation at the 1951 Asian Games in the high jump event finishing 1.93m. He won a bronze in the next edition in 1954. He participated at the 1952 Summer Olympics in the high jump event finishing 31st. Franco stood six foot tall.

Franco later played basketball, then he became a basketball referee upon his retirement as a basketball player.

== Later life ==
Franco then started his career as a police officer. He also became a technical official in track and field.

During the early years of the Philippine Amateur Basketball League approached one sports writer at the Rizal Memorial Coliseum complaining that the PABL officials at the gate of the sports venue wouldn't let him watch the then ongoing game where his son Aris was playing. The journalist approached PABL chairman, Oscar Villadolid who recognized Franco. Villadolid introduced Franco to the stuff then stated that from then on Franco will be allowed to watch any game he pleases and a seat at the presidential box was to be reserved for him. Franco then watched numerous games at the Coliseum.

Sometime in his later years, Franco suffered a stroke. He died in early 2008 due to a lingering illness.

== Honors ==
Athlete of the Decade (1945–1954) by the National Collegiate Athletic Association.
