= Raj Kumar Mehra =

Indian cyclist

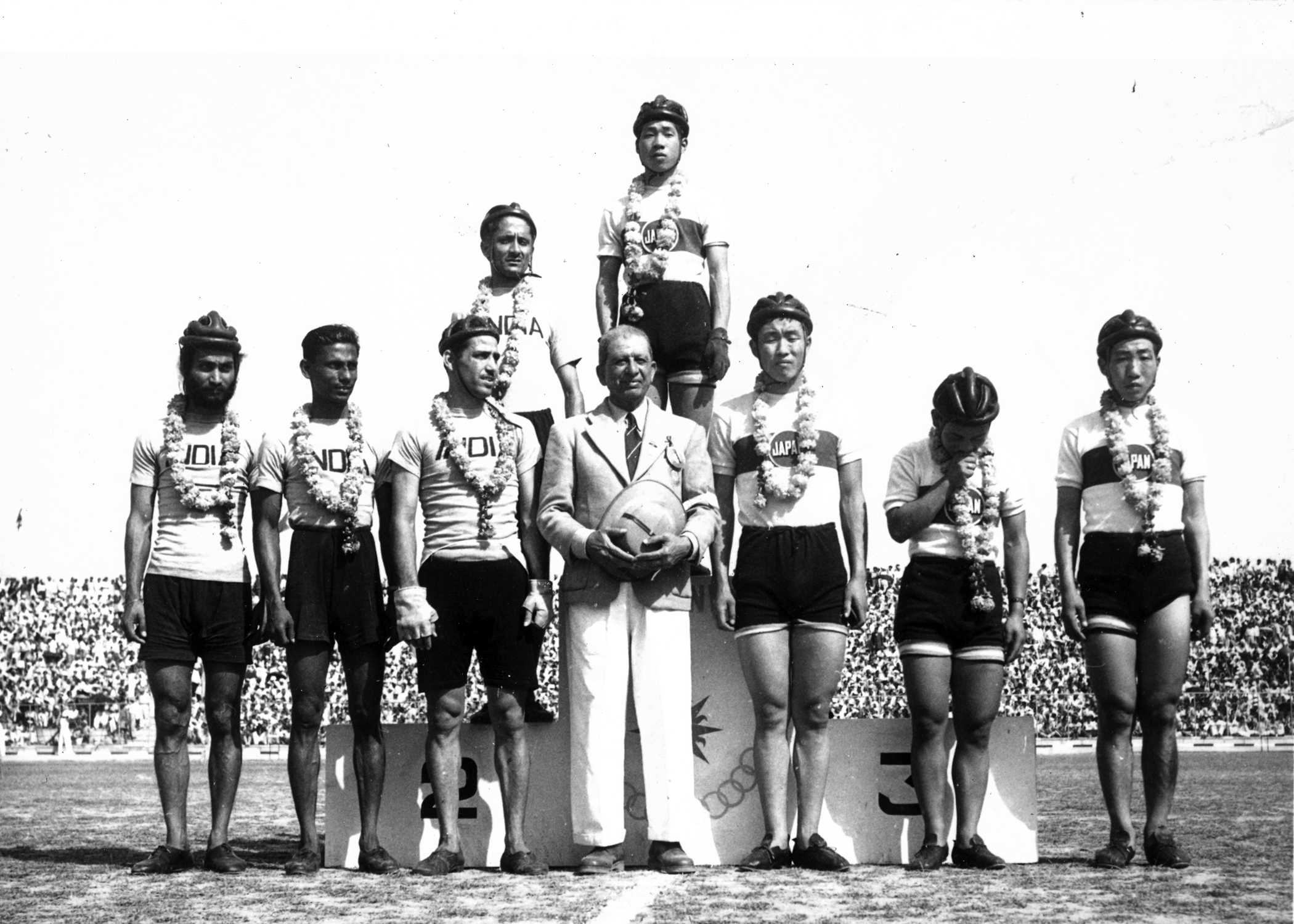
- Raj Kumar Mehra at the 1951 Asian Games

Personal information
- Born: 16 April 1918
- Died: 5 January 2001 (aged 82) Rajpur Sonarpur, India

Cycling career
- Sport: Cycling

Raj Kumar Mehra (16 April 1918 – 5 January 2001) was an Indian cyclist. He competed at the 1948 Olympics and the 1952 Olympics. At the 1951 Asian Games he won the silver medal in the team pursuit.
