= Nikka Singh =

Indian athlete

Personal information
- National team: India
- Born: c. 1911-1933 Bhindran, Nabha State, British India (present day Sangrur district, Punjab, India)
- Died: Unknown

Sport
- Sport: Track and field
- Event: Middle distance running
Medal record
Men's athletics
Representing India
Asian Games
Gold medal – first place	1951 New Delhi	1500 m

Nikka Singh was an Indian athlete. He won a gold medal in the men's 1500 metres at the 1951 Asian Games.

A sports stadium in his native village of Bhindran, Sangrur district, Punjab is named in his honour.
