= Bunkichi Sawada =

Japanese pole vaulter (1920–2006)

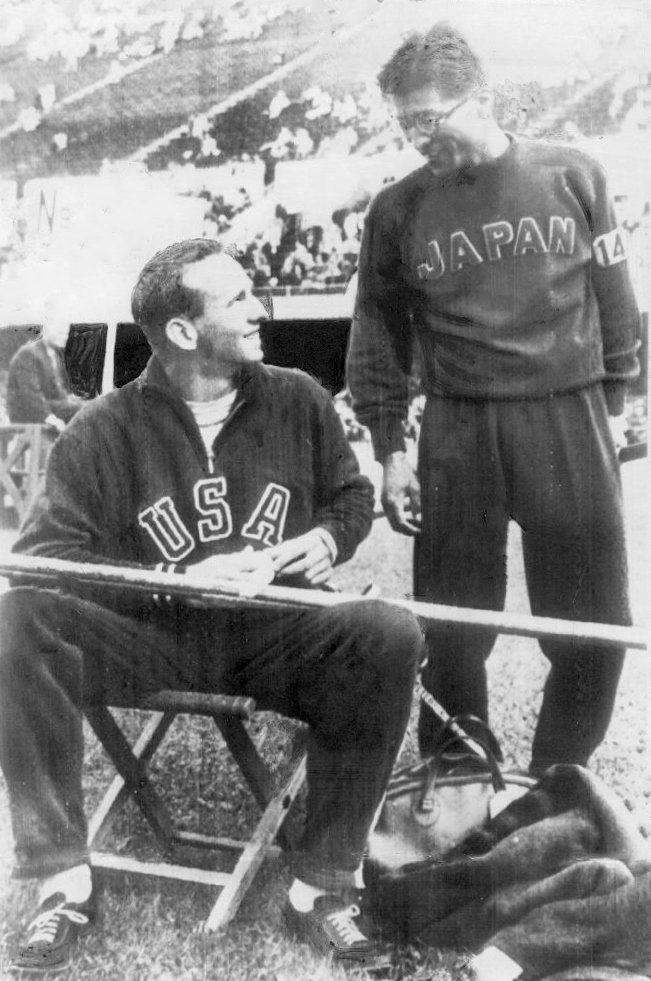
- Don Laz and Bunkichi Sawada (right) at the 1952 Olympics

Personal information
- Born: 18 July 1920 Gifu, Empire of Japan
- Died: 12 May 2006 (aged 85) Gifu, Japan

Sport
- Sport: Athletics
- Event: Pole vault

Achievements and titles
- Personal best: 4.30 m (1942)
Medal record
Representing Japan
Asian Games
Gold medal – first place	1951 New Delhi	Pole vault
Gold medal – first place	1954 Manila	Pole vault

Bunkichi Sawada (沢田 文吉, Sawada Bunkichi; 18 July 1920 – 12 May 2006) was a Japanese pole vaulter who won gold medals at the 1951 and 1954 Asian Games. He placed sixth at the 1952 Summer Olympics, where he served as the flag bearer for Japan.
