= Diving at the 1951 Asian Games =

- Venue: National Stadium Swimming Pool
- Dates: 10–11 March 1951
- Competitors: 5 from 2 nations

Diving was contested from 10 March to 11 March 1951 at the 1951 Asian Games in National Stadium Swimming Pool, New Delhi, India.

Only two countries entered the competition. The host nation India won both gold medals, Iran finished second in medal table by one silver and one bronze.

== Medalists ==
Event	Gold	Silver	Bronze
3 m springboard	K. P. Thakkar; India	Ashu Dutt; India	Taghi Asgari; Iran
10 m platform	K. P. Thakkar; India	Taghi Asgari; Iran	T. T. Dand; India

== Medal table ==
Rank	Nation	Gold	Silver	Bronze	Total
1	India (IND)	2	1	1	4
2	Iran (IRN)	0	1	1	2
Totals (2 entries)		2	2	2	6

== Participating nations ==
A total of 5 athletes from 2 nations competed in diving at the 1951 Asian Games:

- India (3)
- Iran (2)
