= K. P. Thakkar =

Indian diver

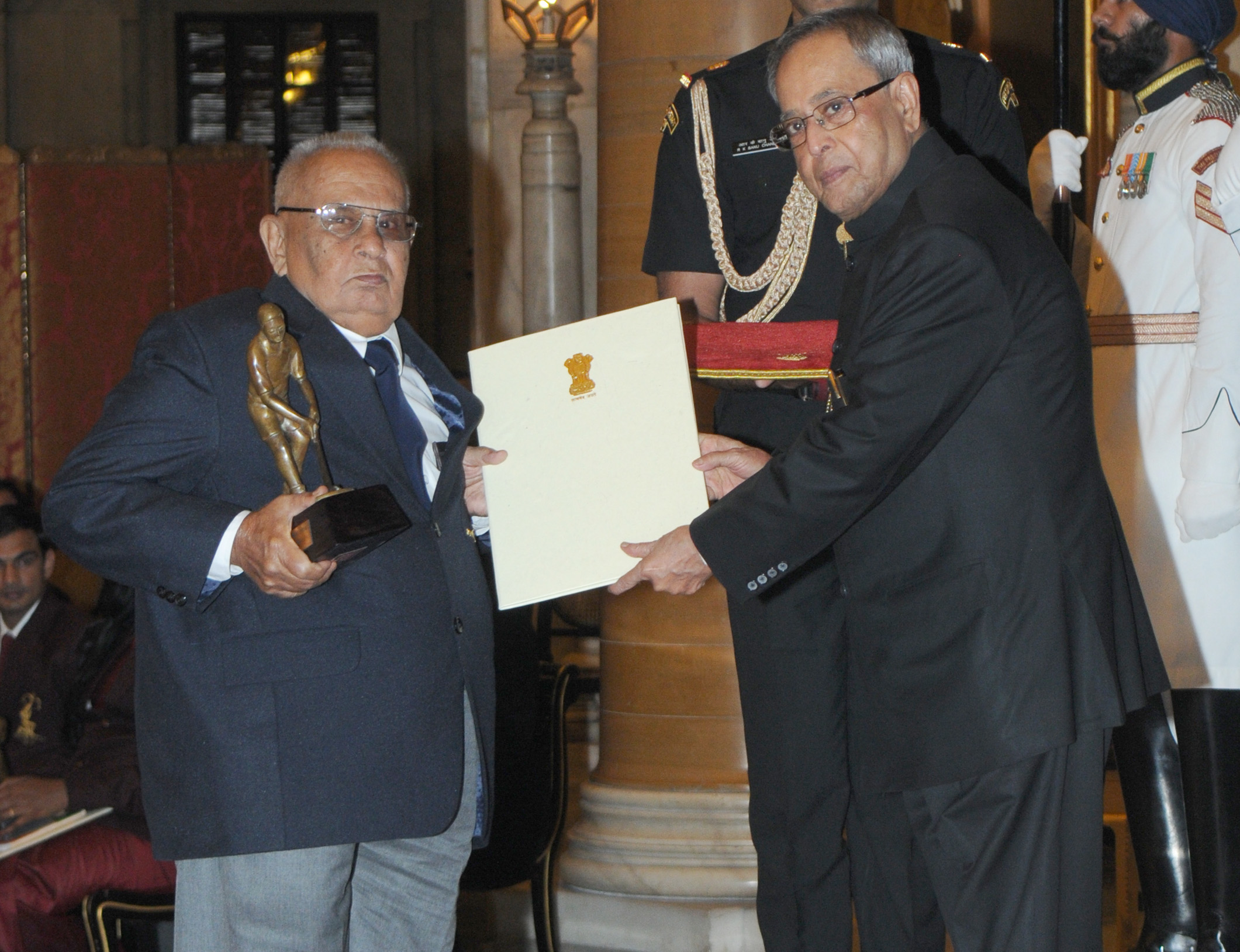
- The President of India, Pranab Mukherjee presenting the Dhyan Chand Award 2014 to Khatau P. Thakkar for Swimming, in a glittering ceremony, at Rashtrapati Bhavan in 2014

Personal information
- Native name: खटाऊ ठक्कर
- National team: India
- Born: Khatau Thakkar; 1932
- Died: October 12, 2016 (aged 83–84) Mumbai, Maharashtra, India

Sport
- Sport: Diving
Medal record
Men's diving
Representing India
Asian Games
Gold medal – first place	1951 New Delhi	3 m springboard
Gold medal – first place	1951 New Delhi	10 m platform
Bronze medal – third place	1954 Manila	10 m platform

Khatau Thakkar (c. 1932 – 12 October 2016), popularly known as K. P. Thakkar and KP, was an Indian diver, who won gold medals in men's 3m springboard and men's 10m platform at the 1951 Asian Games, and a bronze medal in men's 10m platform at the 1954 Asian Games. He was a National Diving Champion for several years. He was awarded the Dhyan Chand Award for Lifetime Achievement in 2014 by the Government of India.

He died on 12 October 2016 at the age of 84.
