= Amit Singh Bakshi =

Indian field hockey player (1925–2024)

Personal information
- National team: India
- Born: 17 September 1925 British India
- Died: 22 June 2024 (aged 98) Dwarka, Delhi, India
- Education: Satish Chander Dhawan Government College, Ludhiana, Punjab, India
- Years active: 1945–1951

Sport
- Country: India
- Sport: Track and field
- Position: Centre half
- Event: Sprints
Senior career
| Years | Team | Caps | Goals |
| 1951–1962 | Services | - | - |
National team
| Years | Team | Caps | Goals |
| 1956 | India | 1 | (0) |
Medal record
Men's field hockey
Representing India
Summer Olympic Games
| Gold medal – first place | 1956 Melbourne | Team |

Amit Singh Bakshi (17 September 1925 – 22 June 2024) was an Indian athlete and field hockey player.

== Biography ==
Bakshi won a gold medal as a member of the men's 4x400m relay team, and a silver medal in men's 400 metres at the 1951 Asian Games in New Delhi.

He won a gold medal as a member of the India national team at the 1956 Summer Olympics in Melbourne. Originally a backup member, he was added to the squad only when Gursewak Singh was declared medically unfit. Bakshi played in just one game, India's 16-0 victory over USA in the group stage. He played for Services in the Senior National Hockey Championship, captaining them to the title in 1953 and 1956, and the runner-up position in 1954.

Bakshi was a Wing Commander in the Indian Air Force, and was later released to Air India as a commercial pilot.

Bakshi died on 22 June 2024, at the age of 98.
