= Bimal Chandra =

Indian swimmer (1927–1998)

Personal information
- Full name: Bimal Kumar Chandra
- National team: India
- Born: 19 November 1927
- Died: 17 February 1998 (aged 70)

Sport
- Sport: Swimming
- Strokes: Freestyle
Medal record
Men's swimming
Representing India
Asian Games
Bronze medal – third place	1951 New Delhi	400 m freestyle
Bronze medal – third place	1951 New Delhi	4×100 m freestyle relay

Bimal Chandra (19 November 1927 – 17 February 1998) was an Indian swimmer. He competed in two events at the 1948 Summer Olympics.
