= Mehanga Singh Sidhu =

Indian high jumper (born 1922)

Personal information
- Nationality: Indian
- Born: 15 August 1922

Sport
- Sport: Athletics
- Event: High jump

Mehanga Singh Sidhu (born 15 August 1922) is an Indian athlete. He competed in the men's high jump at the 1951 Asian Games and the 1952 Summer Olympics.
