= Madan Lal (athlete) =

Indian shot put athlete

Personal information
- National team: India
- Born: c. 1911-1933

Sport
- Sport: Athletics
- Event: Shot put
Medal record
Men's athletics
Representing India
Asian Games
Gold medal – first place	1951 New Delhi	Shot put

Madan Lal is an Indian athlete. He won a gold medal in the men's shot put at the 1951 Asian Games.
