= Ayako Yoshikawa =

Japanese sprinter and long jumper (1933–2025)

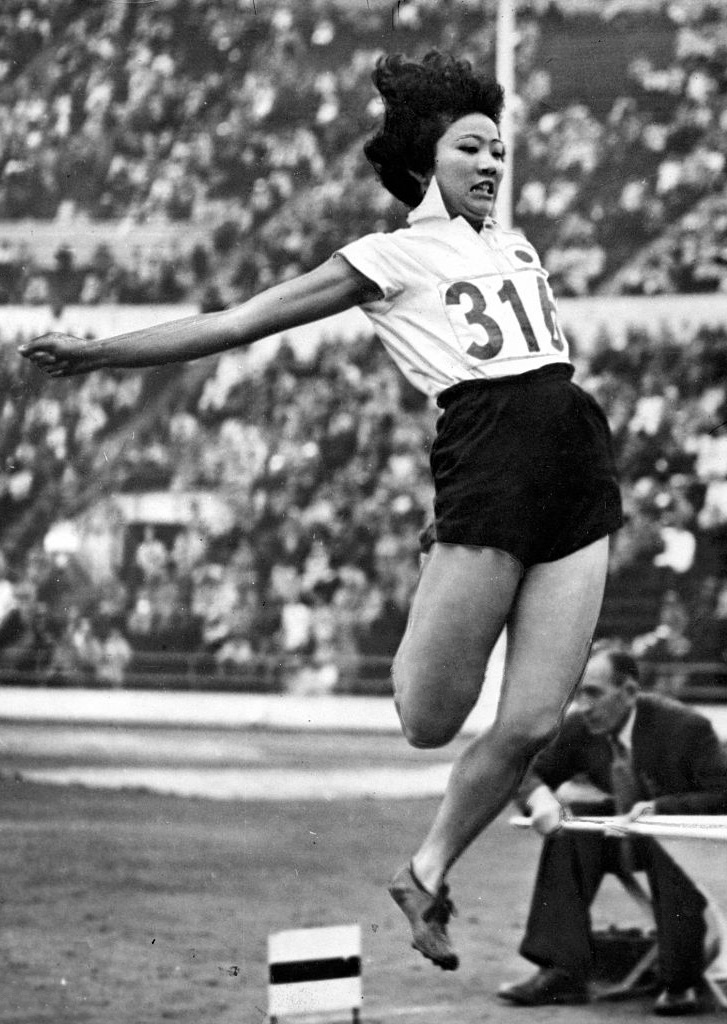
- Yoshikawa at the 1952 Olympics

Personal information
- Born: 1 March 1933 Osaka, Japan
- Died: 11 March 2025 (aged 92)

Sport
- Sport: Athletics
- Events: Sprint, long jump

Achievements and titles
- Personal bests: 100 m – 12.0 (1951); LJ – 5.75 m (1952)
Medal record
Representing Japan
Asian Games
Gold medal – first place	1951 New Delhi	4×100 m
Silver medal – second place	1951 New Delhi	Long jump

Ayako Yoshikawa (吉川 綾子, Yoshikawa Ayako; later Hoshino, 1 March 1933 – 11 March 2025) was a Japanese athlete. She won a gold medal in the 4 × 100 m relay and a silver in the long jump at the 1951 Asian Games, and placed 16th in the long jump at the 1952 Summer Olympics.

Yoshikawa began competing in track and field in high school, and was coached by Mikio Oda. While in high school, she participated in the 1950 Japan Championships, setting a new record for her school. She went on to become a teacher and a reporter for the Sankei Shimbun.

Yoshikawa died on 11 March 2025, at the age of 92.
