= Ranjit Singh (runner) =

Indian athlete

Personal information
- National team: India
- Born: c. 1911-1933 British India

Sport
- Sport: Track and field
- Event: Middle distance running
Medal record
Men's athletics
Representing India
Asian Games
Gold medal – first place	1951 New Delhi	800 m

Ranjit Singh is an Indian athlete. He won a gold medal in the men's 800 metres at the 1951 Asian Games.
