= Dalip Singh (athlete) =

Indian athlete

Dalip Singh Grewal MBE (27 April 1899 - between 1971 and 1982) was an Indian track and field athlete who competed in the 1924 Summer Olympics and in the 1928 Summer Olympics.

== Biography ==
He was born in Dolon khurd, Punjab as a Sikh and was the father of Balkrishan Singh. In 1924 he was eliminated in the qualification of the long jump competition and finished 14th overall. Four years later he finished 36th in the long jump event at the 1928 Olympics.

To the late Brigadier Dalip Singh goes the credit of being the first Sikh to represent India in the Olympics. The 1924 Olympic Games were held in Paris in which India sent a contingent of seven athletes. In this seven-man squad, two Sikhs, Dalip and Palam made their debut.

Dalip Singh was not an Olympian of the 1920 Antwerp games, which included six Indians. The inclusion of Dalip Singh in the 1924 Paris Olympic Games was made possible due to the sponsorship of Bhupinder Singh of Patiala, the Maharaja of Patiala. Apart from athletics, Dalip Singh also played hockey, and he was expected to represent the Patiala Tigers in the Olympic trials that were conducted in Lahore. Based on his performance in the trials, he was chosen to play for the seven-man team from India. Although the team could not get any medals at the Games, Dalip Singh took part in the long jump event and placed among the top six.

Another honour which went to Dalip Singh was that he was the first Indian, a Sikh, to be the torch-bearer at the inaugural Asian Games at Delhi in 1951.

Born in Dolon Khurd, a village now in Ludhiana, Dalip Singh attended Mission School, then joined Forman Christian College and Law College, in Lahore, in current day Pakistan. At Forman Christian College, he emerged as a fine athlete, demonstrating talent in various events, including the 100, 200, 440 yard dashes, 120 yards hurdles, and long jump while he attended university. He played hockey and cricket as well.

But he got the real breakthrough when he was selected to represent India in the 1924 Paris Olympics. He was the captain of the Indian athletic team.

In fact, Dalip Singh can be described as a very distinguished man, In World War II, Dalip served in the Patiala Infantry. He had joined the Patiala army in 1924. For his services, he was awarded as a Member of British Empire (MBE)

Sporting positions
Preceded by First Final Torchbearer	Final Asian Games torchbearer New Delhi 1951	Succeeded by Enriquito Beech
Preceded by First Final Torchbearer	Final Asian Games (Summer) torchbearer New Delhi 1951	Succeeded by Enriquito Beech
