= Bakhtawar Singh =

Indian racewalker

Personal information
- Nationality: Indian

Sport
- Country: India
- Sport: Track and field
- Event: Racewalking
Medal record
Men's athletics
Representing India
Asian Games
Gold medal – first place	1951 New Delhi	50 km walk

Bakhtawar Singh is an Indian athlete. He won a gold medal in the men's 50 kilometres walk at the 1951 Asian Games.
