= Ng Liang Chiang =

Singaporean hurdler (1921–1992)

Personal information
- Born: 4 August 1921 Singapore, Straits Settlements
- Died: 5 September 1992 (aged 71) Singapore
- Spouse: Lim Sian Heng

Sport
- Sport: Athletics
- Event: Hurdles
Medal record
Men's athletics
Representing Singapore
Asian Games
Gold medal – first place	1951 New Delhi	110 m hurdles
Bronze medal – third place	1951 New Delhi	400 m hurdles

Ng Liang Chiang (Chinese: 黄两正; pinyin: Huáng Liǎngzhèng; 4 August 1921 – 5 September 1992) was a Singaporean hurdler. Ng and sprinter Chee Swee Lee are the only Singaporeans with a gold medal in athletics at the Asian Games. He is a Singapore Sports Council Hall of Fame inductee. In 1999, Ng was ranked 16th in a list of Singapore's 50 Greatest Athletes of the Century by The Straits Times.

== Athletics career ==
Born the eldest of 12 children to a lift-fitter, Ng studied at Serangoon English School. He took up athletics in 1934 but did not have formal training, learning only from books.

Ng returned to the track after the Japanese occupation. In May 1948, he was chosen to represent Malayan Chinese at the China National Meet for local and overseas Chinese athletes in Shanghai, where he set new China national record times of 16.0 s and 57.9 s in the 110-meter and 400-meter hurdles respectively. Ng's records led to his selection to represent the Republic of China in the 400-meter hurdles at the 1948 Summer Olympics in London. He was not selected for Singapore as they were only affiliated to the International Olympic Committee in late August and his name had been submitted by China. In London, he suffered a toothache, which prevented him from performing his best and he did not qualify from the heats.

Along with close rival Lloyd Valberg, Ng was one of two athletes from Singapore selected to represent Malaya at their first British Empire Games in Auckland. He was eliminated from the 400-meter hurdles heats following similar issues at the London Olympics.

The highlight of Ng's career came when he was selected in the Singapore contingent for the inaugural Asian Games in New Delhi. On 10 March 1951, he won Singapore's first medal in athletics when he came in third in the 400-meter hurdles. He followed the medal with a win in the 110-meter hurdles in a time of 15.2 s to clinch one of Singapore's five medals at the Games.

In May 1951, Ng shaved 0.4 s off Valberg's Malayan record and improved on his Asian Games time with 15.1 s in the 110-meter hurdles. He was ineligible for the 1952 Summer Olympics as he had represented China at the previous Olympics.

In December 1972, Ng joined the national coaching set-up, mentoring the national hurdlers, including 1967 Southeast Asian Peninsular Games gold medalist Heather Merican, for the 1973 Southeast Asian Peninsular Games, which Singapore hosted.

== Personal life ==
Ng married fellow athlete Lim Sian Heng in 1960. The couple have four sons – Christopher, Andrew, Thomas, Augustine.

Ng died of throat cancer on 5 September 1992.
