= Jehangir Naegamwalla =

Indian swimmer and water polo player

Jehangir Naigamwalla
Personal information
- Full name: Jehangir J. Naigamwalla
- National team: India

Sport
- Sport: Swimming
- Strokes: Breaststroke, medley
- Club: Bombay State Aquatic Association
Medal record
Men's swimming
Representing India
Asian Games
Bronze medal – third place	1951 New Delhi	200 m breaststroke
Bronze medal – third place	1951 New Delhi	3×100 m medley relay

Jehangir Naigamwalla was an Indian swimmer and water polo player. He competed in the men's tournament at the 1952 Summer Olympics.
