= Mahabir Prasad (race walker) =

Indian athlete

Personal information
- National team: India
- Born: c. 1911-1933 British India

Sport
- Sport: Track and field
- Event: Racewalking
Medal record
Men's athletics
Representing India
Asian Games
Gold medal – first place	1951 New Delhi	10 km walk

Mahabir Prasad is an Indian athlete. He won a gold medal in the men's 10 kilometres walk at the 1951 Asian Games.
