= Stephie D'Souza =

Indian sprinter

Personal information
- Full name: Stephanie D'Souza
- Nickname: Flying Rani
- Nationality: Indian
- Born: Stephanie D'Souza; 26 December 1936 Goa, Portuguese India
- Died: 11 September 1998 (aged 61) Jamshedpur, India
- Education: Sardar Dastur Girls School; Fergusson College
- Employer: Indian Railways
- Height: 5 ft 2 in (157 cm)
- Weight: 110 lb (50 kg)

Sport
- Sport: Track and field
- Event: Sprint
Medal record
Women's athletics
Representing India
Asian Games
Gold medal – first place	1954 Manila	4×100 m relay
Silver medal – second place	1958 Tokyo	200 m
Bronze medal – third place	1958 Tokyo	4×100 m relay

Stephanie "Stephie" D'Souza, nee Sequeira (26 December 1936 – 11 September 1998) was an Indian sportsperson who represented India in athletics and women's hockey.

== Early life ==
Stephanie "Stephie" D Souza was born on 26 December 1936. She studied at the Sardar Dastur Girls School at Pune, and later shifted to the Fergusson College to do her graduation. She worked with Central Railways (Pune Division). After her marriage, she shifted to Jamshedpur.

D'Souza was part of the Indian team that won the gold in the 4 × 100 m relay in the 1954 Asian Games (with Violet Peters, Christine Brown and Mary D'Souza) and a bronze in 1958. She won a silver in the 200 m, creating an Asian record in the semifinal, and finished fourth in the 100 m in the latter competition. At one point, she held the national records in 100 m, 200 m, 400 m and 800 m. She was the first Indian woman to complete 100m in 12 seconds, beating the previous record of 12.1 by Mary D'Souza, at Pune in 1956.

She was eliminated in the first round of the 400 m in the 1964 Summer Olympics after finishing sixth despite setting a national record of 58.0 seconds. She took part in the 100 yards and 220 yards sprints in the 1958 Commonwealth Games. D'Souza represented India in the first international women's hockey tournament in London in 1953 and captained the side in 1961.

Stephie D'Souza married Patrick Sequeira, who was also a sprinter, in SFS Cathedral in Nagpur on May 8, 1959. She won the Arjuna Award presented by the Government of India. She died in Jamshedpur (Jharkhand) at the age of 61.

=== National and international competitions ===
Year	Competition	Venue	Position	Event	Notes
1954	Asian Games	Manila	1st	4x100 metres	49.5
1954	Asian Games	Manila	4th	200 metres	
1957	National championship		1st	100 metres	
1957	National championship		1st	200 metres	
1958	Asian Games	Tokyo	2nd	200 metres	26.2
1958	Asian Games	Tokyo	3rd	400 metres relay	49.4
1958	Commonwealth Games	Cardiff	Eliminated in heats	100 metres and 200 metres	

== See also ==
- List of Indian women athletes

== Bibliography ==
- K.R. Wadhwaney, Arjuna Awardees, Publications Division, Ministry of Information and Broadcasting, Government of India, 2002, ISBN 81-230-0286-0
