= Indonesia at the 1951 Asian Games =

- IOC code: INA
- NOC: Indonesian Olympic Committee
- Website: www.nocindonesia.or.id (in English)

in New Delhi
- Medals Ranked 7th: Gold 0 Silver 0 Bronze 5 Total 5

Asian Games appearances (overview)
- 1951; 1954; 1958; 1962; 1966; 1970; 1974; 1978; 1982; 1986; 1990; 1994; 1998; 2002; 2006; 2010; 2014; 2018; 2022; 2026

Indonesia participated in the 1951 Asian Games held in the city of New Delhi, India from 4 to 11 March 1951.

== Medal summary ==
=== Medal table ===
Sport	Gold	Silver	Bronze	Total
Athletics	0	0	5	5
Total	0	0	5	5

=== Medalists ===
Medal	Name	Sport	Event	Ref
Bronze	Maram Sudarmodjo	Athletics	Men's high jump	
Bronze	Hendarsin	Athletics	Men's triple jump	
Bronze	A.F. Matulessy	Athletics	Men's javelin throw	
Bronze	Annie Salamun	Athletics	Women's discus throw	
Bronze	Triwulan; Darwati; Surjowati; Lie Djiang Nio	Athletics	Women's 4×100 m relay	
