= Sambhu Saha =

Indian swimmer and water polo player

Personal information
- National team: India
- Born: 1 November 1925

Sport
- Sport: Swimming
- Strokes: Freestyle
Medal record
Men's swimming
Representing India
Asian Games
Bronze medal – third place	1951 New Delhi	4×100 m freestyle relay

Sambhu Saha (born 1 November 1925) was an Indian swimmer and water polo player. He competed in the men's tournament at the 1952 Summer Olympics.
