= Kihei Tomioka =

Japanese cyclist (1932–2007)

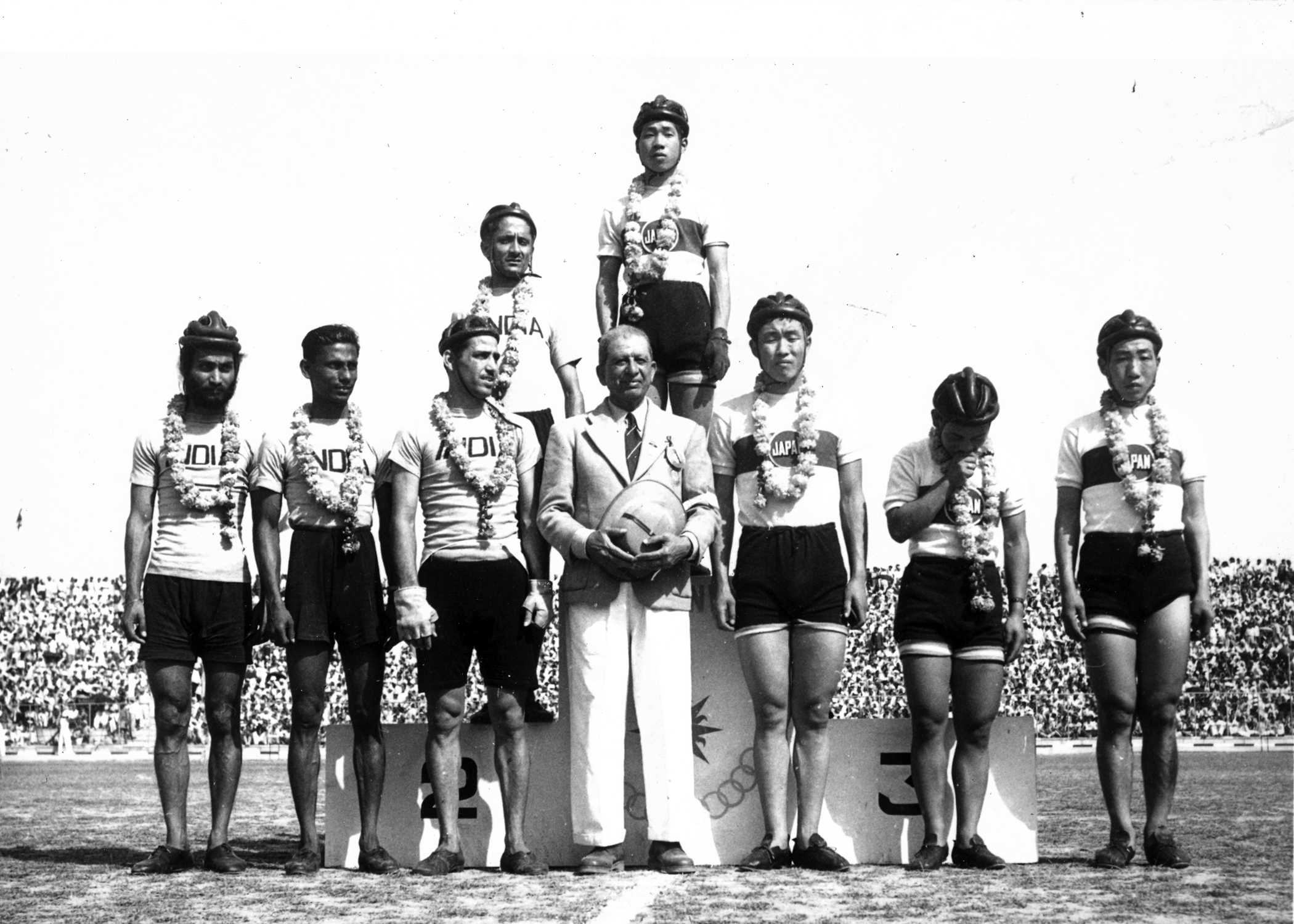
- Tomioka at the 1951 Asian Games

Personal information
- Born: 6 January 1932 Hachinohe, Aomori, Japan
- Died: 14 August 2007 (aged 75)

Cycling career
- Sport: Cycling

Kihei Tomioka (富岡 喜平, Tomioka Kihei; 6 January 1932 – 14 August 2007) was a Japanese cyclist. He competed in five events at the 1952 Summer Olympics. He won the gold medal in the team pursuit and in the road race at the 1951 Asian Games.
