= Mary D'Souza Sequeira =

Indian field hockey player (born 1931)

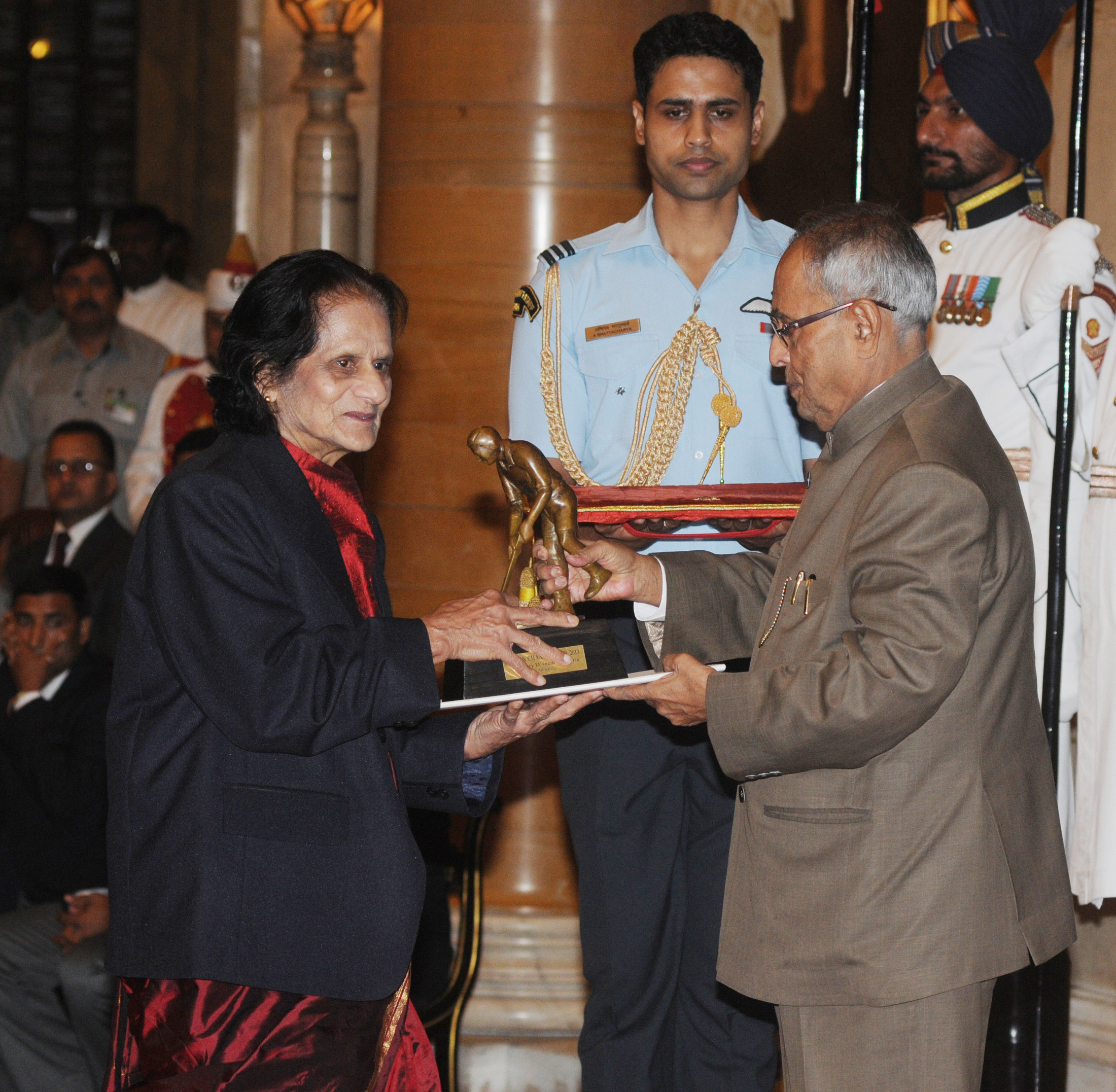
- The President, Shri Pranab Mukherjee presenting the Dhyan Chand Award to Ms. Mary D’souza Sequeira for Athletics, at the National Sports & Adventure awards ceremony, at Rashtrapati Bhawan, in New Delhi on 31 August 2013

Personal information
- Full name: Mary D'Souza Sequeira
- Nationality: Indian
- Born: 18 July 1931 (age 94)
- Employer: Indian Railways

Sport
- Sport: Track and field
- Event: Sprint
Medal record
Women's athletics
Representing India
Asian Games
Gold medal – first place	1954 Manila	4×100 m relay
Silver medal – second place	1951 New Delhi	4×100 m relay
Bronze medal – third place	1951 New Delhi	200 m

Mary D'Souza Sequeira (born 18 July 1931) is an Indian female Olympian who competed internationally in track and field and field hockey. She competed in the women's 100 and 200 metres at the 1952 Summer Olympics. D'Souza won a bronze medal in the 200 metres and a silver medal in the 4 × 100 m relay at the 1951 Asian Games

D'Souza won a gold medal in the 1954 Asian Games in Manila in the 4 × 100 m relay, with Stephie D'Souza, Violet Peters and Christine Brown in a time of 49.5 seconds. She held the Asian records in 100 and 200 meters in 1956. She is the first Indian double international. She played field hockey for India in 1953 in Folkestone, England, in 1956 in Australia, in the IWFHA International Tournament and in test matches vs Japan and Ceylon.

== Career ==
In 1951, D'Souza competed in the First Asian Games in New Delhi, winning a silver medal in the 4x100 meter relay and a bronze in the 200 meters. First Indian Female Team Asian Games. In the Second Asian Games in Manila in 1954 she won a gold medal in the 4x100 meter relay. 1954 Asian Games medal table First Indian Female Gold Medal Asian Games. She set Indian national records in track and field from 1951 to 1957 100 meters, 200 meters and 80m hurdles. She was the Asian record holder with 12.3 seconds over 100 meters and 12.5 seconds over 200 meters. She was the first female track and field contingent to go to the Olympics from India in 1952. She competed in the 100m and 200m.

She was a field hockey player with India's first women's field hockey team, in the First International Women's Field Hockey World Tournament in Folkestone, UK, 1953 In 1956 she represented India at the Australian International Women's Field Hockey Tournament. She was the top scorer for India in goals in the tournament. She played India vs Ceylon matches, as right winger assisted in both goals

She was with the Indian team that played in the Prime Ministers Defense Fund Field Hockey Tour in 1961. She also took part in the India vs Ceylon (Sri Lanka) field hockey tour in India and the India vs Japan field hockey test matches touring India in 1964

She was an Indian Railways sports officer who coached and recruited sportspeople for Indian Railways teams and conducted Inter Railway Tournaments. She was also a district commissioners with the Girl Guides(Scouts). She earned the Dhyan Chand Award in 2013 from the Government of India.
