= Makhan Singh (discus thrower) =

Indian discus thrower

Personal information
- Nationality: Indian

Sport
- Country: India
- Sport: Athletics
Medal record
Men's athletics
Representing India
Asian Games
Gold medal – first place	1951 New Delhi	Discus throw

Makhan Singh is an Indian athlete. He won a gold medal in Discus throw in the 1951 New Delhi Asian games.
