= Kiyoko Sugimura =

Japanese athlete (born 1929)

Personal information
- Nationality: Japanese
- Born: 22 September 1929

Sport
- Country: Japan
- Sport: Athletics
Medal record
Women's athletics
Representing Japan
Asian Games
Gold medal – first place	1951 New Delhi	100 m
Gold medal – first place	1951 New Delhi	4×100 m
Gold medal – first place	1951 New Delhi	Long jump

Kiyoko Sugimura (born 22 September 1929) is a Japanese athlete. She won gold medals in the 4 × 100 m relay, individual 100 metres and long jump in the 1951 Asian Games.
