= Ram Swaroop =

Indian Athlete

Personal information
- Nationality: Indian

Sport
- Country: India
- Sport: Athletics
Medal record
Men's athletics
Representing India
Asian Games
Silver medal – second place	1951 New Delhi	4×100 m

Ram Swaroop is an Indian athlete. He won a silver medal in the 4 × 100 m relay in the 1951 Delhi Asian games.
