= Violet Peters =

Indian track and field athlete

Personal information
- Nickname: Kuku
- Nationality: Indian
- Born: Bombay, British India
- Died: July 2020 Melbourne

Sport
- Country: India
- Sport: Athletics
Medal record
Women's athletics
Representing India
Asian Games
Gold medal – first place	1954 Manila	4×100 m
Bronze medal – third place	1958 Tokyo	4×100 m

Violet Peters ( died July 2020) is an Indian athlete. She won a gold medal in 4 × 100 m relay in the 1954 Asian Games with Christine Brown, Stephie d'Souza and Mary d'Souza, with a time of 49.5 seconds. She belonged to an Anglo-Indian family from Bombay.
