= Chhota Singh =

Indian long-distance runner (born 1918)

Personal information
- Nationality: Indian
- Born: Chhota singh 1918 Patiala, British India

Sport
- Sport: Long-distance running
- Event: Marathon
Medal record
Men's athletics
Representing India
Asian Games
Gold medal – first place	1951 New Delhi	Marathon

Chhota Singh (born 1918, date of death unknown) was an Indian long-distance runner. He was one of the top Indian marathon runners of the 1930s and 1940s. He competed in the marathon at the 1948 Summer Olympics.

Games	Event	Team / NOC	POS	Medal	As
1948 Summer Olympics	Athletics, Marathon (Men)	IND	DNF		Chhota Singh
1951 Asian Games	Athletics, Marathon (Men)	IND	2:42:58.6 GR	Gold	Chhota Singh

Singh is deceased.
