= Tomio Hosoda =

Japanese sprinter

Personal information
- Nationality: Japanese
- Born: 細田 富男; 19 January 1926
- Died: 27 July 2008 (aged 82) Tokyo, Japan

Sport
- Sport: Sprinting
- Event: 100 metres
Medal record
Men's athletics
Representing Japan
Asian Games
Gold medal – first place	1951 New Delhi	4×100 m relay
Bronze medal – third place	1951 New Delhi	100 m
Bronze medal – third place	1951 New Delhi	200 m

Tomio Hosoda (細田 富男, 19 January 1926 – 27 July 2008) was a Japanese sprinter. He competed in the men's 100 metres at the 1952 Summer Olympics.

== Competition record ==
Representing Japan
Year	Competition	Venue	Position	Event	Notes
1952	Olympics	Helsinki, Finland	4th (q-finals)	100 m	11.03/10.8
