= Nepal at the 1951 Asian Games =

- IOC code: NEP
- NOC: Nepal Olympic Committee

in New Delhi
- Medals Ranked NAth: Gold 0 Silver 0 Bronze 0 Total 0

Asian Games appearances (overview)
- 1951; 1954; 1958; 1962; 1966; 1970; 1974; 1978; 1982; 1986; 1990; 1994; 1998; 2002; 2006; 2010; 2014; 2018; 2022; 2026

Nepal participated in the 1951 Asian Games held in the city of New Delhi, India from March 4, 1951 to March 11, 1951. Athletes from Nepal failed to secure any medal spot in these Games.
