= Kyoko Yoneda =

Japanese athlete

Personal information
- Nationality: Japanese

Sport
- Country: Japan
- Sport: Athletics
Medal record
Women's athletics
Representing Japan
Asian Games
Gold medal – first place	1951 New Delhi	80 m Hurdles
Gold medal – first place	1951 New Delhi	High jump

Kyoko Yoneda is a Japanese athlete. She won a gold medal in High jump and 80 meters hurdles in the 1951 Asian Games.
