= Barbara Webster =

Indian athlete

Personal information
- Nationality: Indian
- Born: Bombay, British India

Sport
- Country: India
- Sport: Athletics
Medal record
Women's athletics
Representing India
Asian Games
Bronze medal – third place	1951 New Delhi	Shot put
Bronze medal – third place	1951 New Delhi	Javelin throw

Barbara Webster is an Indian athlete. She won bronze medals in shot put and javelin throw in the 1951 Asian Games. Webster, like several of the Indian women's team, was an Anglo-Indian from Bombay.
