= Kimiko Okamoto =

Japanese athlete

Personal information
- Nationality: Japanese

Sport
- Country: Japan
- Sport: Athletics
Medal record
Women's athletics
Representing Japan
Asian Games
Gold medal – first place	1951 New Delhi	200 m
Gold medal – first place	1951 New Delhi	4×100 m
Bronze medal – third place	1951 New Delhi	100 m
Silver medal – second place	1954 Manila	4×100 m

Kimiko Okamoto is a Japanese athlete. She won gold medals in the 4 × 100 m relay and individual 200 metres in the 1951 Asian Games.
