= Sylvia Gauntlet =

Indian long jumper

Personal information
- Nationality: Indian
- Born: Bombay, British India

Sport
- Country: India
- Sport: Athletics
Medal record
Women's athletics
Representing India
Asian Games
Bronze medal – third place	1951 New Delhi	Long jump

Sylvia Gauntlet is an Indian athlete. She won a bronze medal in long jump in 1951 Asian Games. She belonged to an Anglo-Indian family from Bombay.
