= Parsa Singh =

Indian athlete

Personal information
- Nationality: Indian

Sport
- Country: India
- Sport: Athletics
Medal record
Men's athletics
Representing India
Asian Games
Silver medal – second place	1951 New Delhi	Javelin throw

Parsa Singh is an Indian athlete. He won a silver medal in Javelin throw in the 1951 Asian Games.
