= Sachin Nag =

Indian swimmer

Sachin Nag শচীন নাগ
- Sachin Nag

Personal information
- National team: India
- Born: 5 July 1920 Varanasi, United Provinces of Agra and Oudh, British India
- Died: 19 August 1987 (aged 67) Calcutta, West Bengal, India
- Height: 183 cm (6 ft 0 in)

Sport
- Sport: Swimming
- Strokes: Freestyle, medley
- Club: Calcutta
Medal record
Men's swimming
Representing India
Asian Games
Gold medal – first place	1951 New Delhi	100 m freestyle
Bronze medal – third place	1951 New Delhi	4x100 m freestyle relay
Bronze medal – third place	1951 New Delhi	3x100 m medley relay

Sachin Nag (Bengali: শচীন নাগ; 5 July 1920 – 19 August 1987) was an Indian swimmer. He won the gold medal in men's 100 m freestyle at the 1951 Asian Games, the first ever gold medal for India at the Asian Games. It remains the only gold medal won by India in Asian Games swimming as of the conclusion of the 2022 Asian Games. He was also a member of the bronze medal-winning Indian teams in the men's 4 × 100 m freestyle relay and the men's 3x100 m medley relay at the 1951 Asian Games.

He competed in the men's 100 m freestyle at the 1948 Summer Olympics. He also competed in the water polo at the 1948 and 1952 Summer Olympics. He scored four goals on behalf of India.
