= Somnath Chopra =

Indian hammer thrower

Personal information
- Full name: Somnath Singh Chopra
- Nationality: Indian
- Born: 1915 Punjab Province, British India
- Died: 13 April 1988 (aged 72–73) Jalandhar, Punjab, India

Sport
- Sport: Athletics; Volleyball
- Event(s): Hammer throw Discus throw Javelin throw
- Club: Patiala

Somnath "Nat" Singh Chopra (1915 – 13 April 1988) was an Indian athlete and volleyball player who represented the India national volleyball team. He competed in the men's hammer throw at the 1948 Summer Olympics.

== Career ==
=== Athletics ===
Chopra participated in the Punjab championships during the 1930s and was among the top athletic competitors. He held national records in hammer throw from 1938 to 1955 and discus throw from 1945 to 1952. He also competed in javelin throw. He was part of the Indian contingent in the 1948 Summer Olympics, where he participated in the hammer throw event, but did not advance past the qualifying rounds. He won the silver medal in the hammer throw at the 1951 Asian Games in New Delhi.

=== Volleyball ===
Chopra also participated in volleyball where he captained the India side at the 1952 FIVB Men's Volleyball World Championship held at Moscow. India finished at seventh place out of eleven nations.
