= Afghanistan at the 1951 Asian Games =

- IOC code: AFG
- NOC: Afghanistan National Olympic Committee

in New Delhi
- Medals Ranked NAth: Gold 0 Silver 0 Bronze 0 Total 0

Asian Games appearances (overview)
- 1951; 1954; 1958; 1962; 1966; 1970; 1974; 1978; 1982; 1986; 1990; 1994; 1998; 2002; 2006; 2010; 2014; 2018; 2022; 2026

Afghanistan participated in the 1951 Asian Games held in New Delhi, India from 4 to 11 March 1951. Athletes from Afghanistan failed to secure any medal spot in these Games.
