= Fumi Kojima =

Japanese discus thrower (1916–1996)

Personal information
- Nationality: Japanese
- Born: 17 December 1916
- Died: 7 June 1996 (aged 79)

Sport
- Sport: Athletics
- Event: Discus throw

Fumi Kojima (児島 フミ, Kojima Fumi; 17 December 1916 – 7 June 1996) was a Japanese track and field athlete. She competed in the women's discus throw at the 1936 Summer Olympics. She won the silver medal at the 1951 Asian Games and won seven national titles, with four consecutive wins from 1937 to 1940 and three straight titles at the Japan Championships in Athletics from 1946 to 1948.

== See also ==
- List of Asian Games medalists in athletics
