= Marian Gabriel =

Personal information
- Nationality: Indian
- Died: 2011

Sport
- Country: India
- Sport: Athletics
Medal record
Men's athletics
Representing India
Asian Games
Silver medal – second place	1951 New Delhi	200 m
Silver medal – second place	1951 New Delhi	4×100 m
Bronze medal – third place	1954 Manila	100 m

Marian Gabriel (died 2011) is an Indian athlete. He is a triple Asian Games medalist.
