= Fumio Kamamoto =

Japanese hammer thrower

Fumio Kamamoto (釜本 文男, Kamamoto Fumio; 4 November 1918 – 11 February 2011) was a Japanese hammer thrower who competed in the 1956 Summer Olympics.
