= Katsuo Nishida =

Japanese long-distance runner

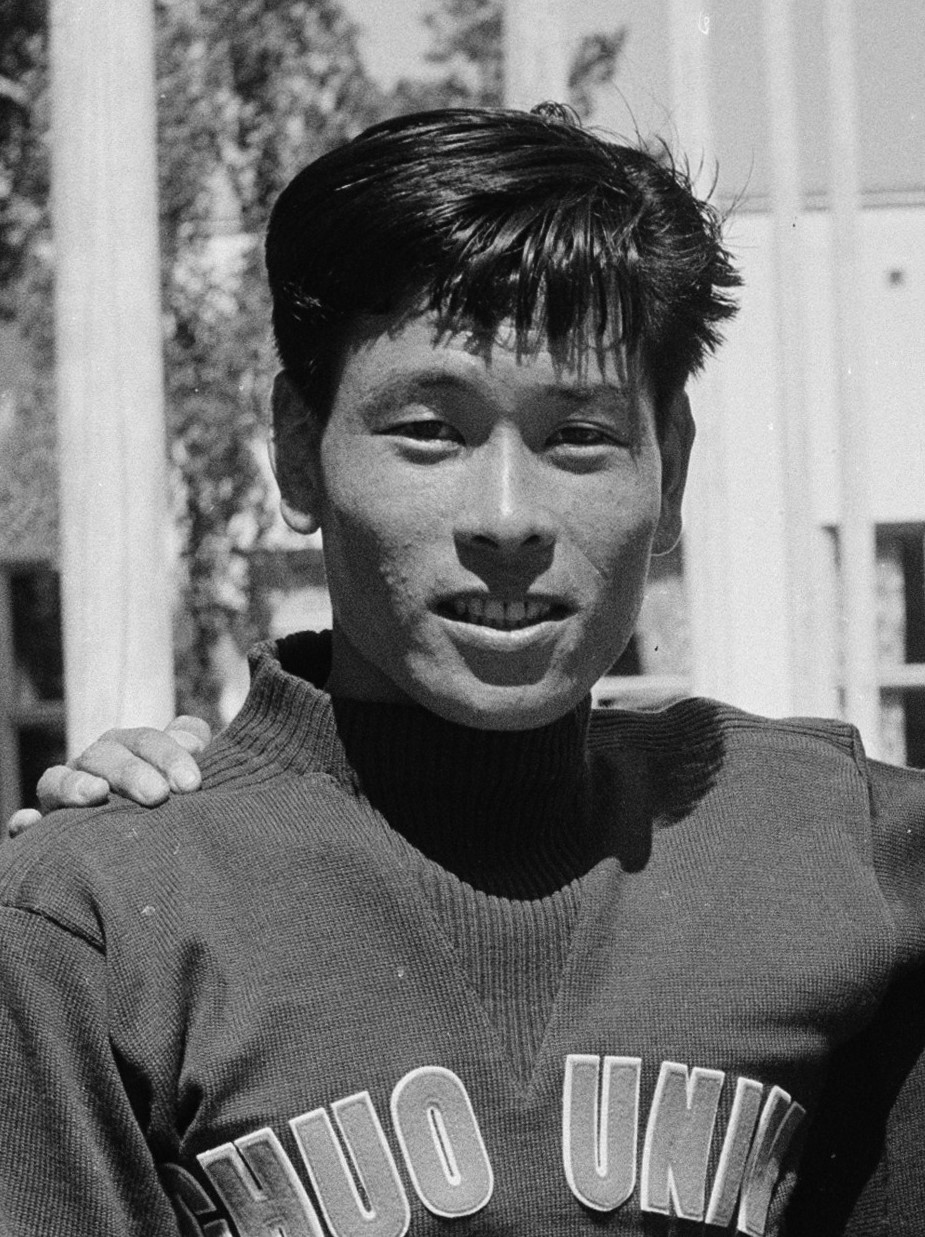
- Katsuo Nishida in 1952

Personal information
- Nationality: Japanese
- Born: 24 January 1929 Fukuoka Prefecture, Japan
- Died: 22 October 2001 (aged 72) Fukuoka, Japan

Sport
- Sport: Long-distance running
- Event: Marathon

Katsuo Nishida (西田 勝男, Nishida Katsuo; 24 January 1929 – 22 October 2001) was a Japanese long-distance runner. He competed in the marathon at the 1952 Summer Olympics.
