= Eitaro Okano =

Japanese sprinter (1930–2020)

Eitaro Okano (岡野 栄太郎, Okano Eitarō; 14 June 1930 – 17 November 2020) was a Japanese sprinter who competed in the 1952 Summer Olympics.
