= Toyoko Yoshino =

Japanese discus thrower

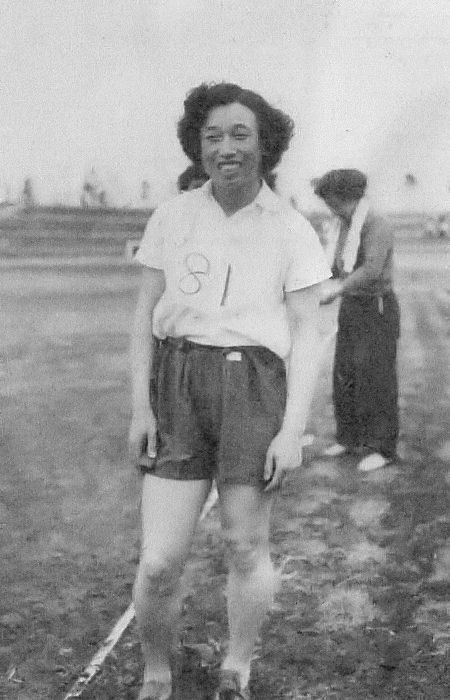

Personal information
- Nationality: Japanese
- Born: 23 April 1920 Abashiri, Hokkaido, Japan
- Died: 24 January 2015 (aged 94) Kawaguchi, Saitama, Japan

Sport
- Sport: Athletics
- Event: Discus throw

Toyoko Yoshino (吉野トヨ子, Yoshino Toyoko; 23 April 1920 – 24 January 2015) was a Japanese discus thrower. She competed at the 1952, placing fourth, and the 1956 Summer Olympics.

From 1949 until 1956 she became Japanese champion eight times in a row.
