= Lavy Pinto =

Indian sprinter (1929–2020)

Personal information
- Full name: Lavinho Thomas Pinto
- Nationality: Indian
- Born: 23 October 1929 Nairobi, Kenya Colony
- Died: 15 February 2020 (aged 90) Chicago, Illinois, US

Sport
- Country: India
- Sport: Track and field
- Event: Sprint
- Club: L.A.C.

Achievements and titles
- Personal bests: 100 m: 10.6 (1952); 200 m: 21.5 (1956)
Medal record
Men's athletics
Representing India
Asian Games
Gold medal – first place	1951 New Delhi	100 m
Gold medal – first place	1951 New Delhi	200 m
Silver medal – second place	1951 New Delhi	4×100 m relay

Lavinho Thomas Pinto (23 October 1929 – 15 February 2020) was an Indian sprinter. He won two gold medals in the first Asian Games held in New Delhi in 1951 for the 100 and 200 metre sprints. He also competed in the 1952 Summer Olympics. Pinto later immigrated to the United States, settling in Chicago. He died there in 2020 at the age of 90.

== Competition record ==
Year	Competition	Venue	Position	Event	Notes
Representing India
1952	Olympics	Helsinki, Finland	4th, SF 1	100 m	10.94/10.7
1952	Olympics	Helsinki, Finland	5th, SF 2	200 m	22.01/21.46
