= Masaji Tajima =

Japanese long jumper

Masaji Tajima (田島 政次, Tajima Masaji; born 5 April 1929) is a Japanese former long jumper who competed in the 1952 Summer Olympics and in the 1956 Summer Olympics. His original name was 田島 政次. He is 5 feet and 7 inches (171 cm) tall. He weighs 128 lbs (58 kg).
