= Susumu Takahashi =

Japanese middle-distance runner

Susumu Takahashi (高橋 進, Takahashi Susumu; 17 November 1920 – 13 May 2001) was a Japanese middle-distance runner who competed in the 1952 Summer Olympics.
