= Baldev Singh (athlete) =

Indian athlete (born c. 1920)

Personal information
- Nationality: Indian
- Born: c. 1920

Sport
- Sport: Athletics
- Events: Long jump Decathlon
Medal record
Men's athletics
Representing India
Asian Championships
Bronze medal – third place	1989 New Delhi	20 km walk

Baldev Singh (born c. 1920) was an Indian athlete. He competed in the men's long jump and the men's decathlon at the 1948 Summer Olympics.

Singh finished third behind Hans Moesgaard-Kjeldsen in the decathlon event at the British 1948 AAA Championships.
