= Roshan Mistry =

Indian sprinter

Personal information
- Nationality: Indian
- Born: Bombay, British India

Sport
- Country: India
- Sport: Athletics
Medal record
Women's athletics
Representing India
Asian Games
Silver medal – second place	1951 New Delhi	100 m
Silver medal – second place	1951 New Delhi	4×100 m relay

Roshan Mistry is an Indian athlete. She won silver medals in the 4 × 100 m relay and individual 100 metres in the 1951 Asian Games. She belonged to a Parsi family from Bombay.
