= 1951 Asian Games =

Multi-sport event in New Delhi, India

First Asian Games
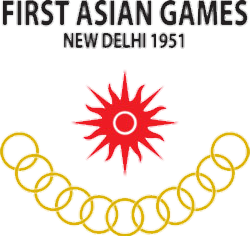
- Logo of the 1951 Asian Games
- Host city: New Delhi, India
- Motto: Play the game in the spirit of the game
- Nations: 11
- Athletes: 489
- Events: 57
- Opening: 4 March 1951
- Closing: 11 March 1951
- Opened by: Rajendra Prasad (President of India)
- Athlete's Oath: Baldev Singh
- Torch lighter: Dalip Singh
- Main venue: National Stadium

The 1951 Asian Games, officially known as the First Asian Games (Hindi: प्रथम एशियाई खेल, romanized: Pratham Asian Khel), were a multi-sport event celebrated in New Delhi, India from 4 to 11 March 1951. The Games received names like First Asiad, 1951 Asiad, and New Delhi 1951 (Hindi: नई दिल्ली 1951). A total of 489 athletes representing 11 Asian National Olympic Committees (NOCs) participated in 57 events from eight sports and discipline. The Games was the successor of the Far Eastern Games and the revival of the Western Asiatic Games. The 1951 Asiad were originally scheduled to be held in 1950, but postponed until 1951 due to delays in preparations. On 13 February 1949, the Asian Games Federation was formally established in Delhi, with Delhi unanimously announced as the first host city of the Asian Games.

The games were managed by a strong Organizing Committee (see Organization below).

Countries invited included almost all the independent Asian countries of the time except Soviet Union (as they were part of the European Olympic Committees) and Vietnam, due to the political structure of those nations.

National Stadium was the venue for all events. The official logo of the First Asiad depicted a bright sun in red with 16 rays and a white circle in the middle of the disc of the sun and eleven rings, representing each participating nation, on a white background, symbolising peace.

Japanese athletes won the 24 gold, 21 silver, and 15 bronze medals, respectively; while the host nation India had 15 golds and 51 overall medals with most bronzes (20) and finished at second spot in a medal table. The next Asian Games organised by India were the 1982 Asian Games, some 31 years later.

== History ==
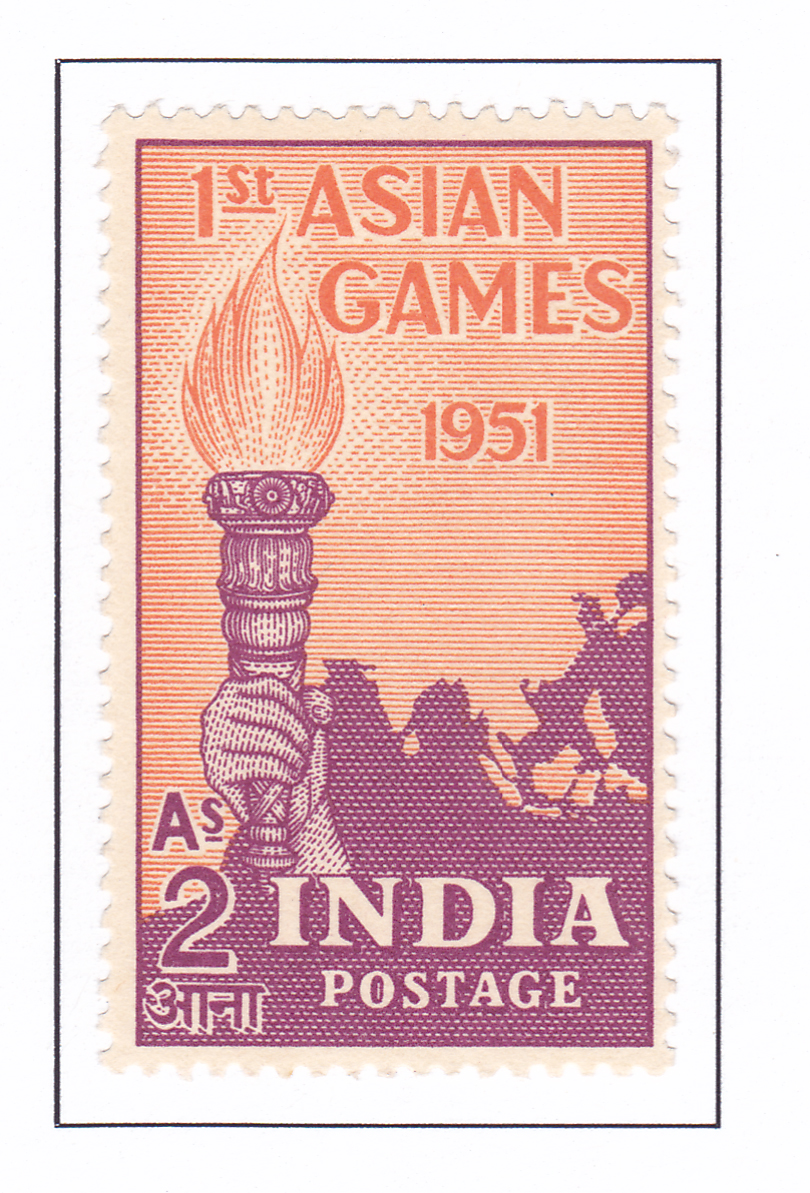
Postage stamp to commemorative 1st Asian Games issued on by India Post

The 1951 Asian Games are considered to be a successor of a small-scale multi-sport event known as the Far Eastern Games, held in between a period of 1913 to 1938 in the different cities of Japan, Philippines, and mainland China. The First Far Eastern Games took place in Manila, Philippines in 1913, after the efforts made by the Philippine Amateur Athletic Federation (PAAF). The Games were successfully organized for the next nine terms, but in September 1937, Japan invaded China after the Marco Polo Bridge Incident and started the Second Sino-Japanese War (which later became part of the World War II), thus the originally planned Games of 1938 in Osaka was cancelled and the Far Eastern Games were discontinued thereafter.

During the starting years of the 1930s, efforts were made to organize a multi-sport event to include the countries of West Asia too, this gave a birth to "Orient Championship Games", which later renamed as Western Asiatic Games before its first inception. The scope of the Games comprised all the countries east of Suez and west of Singapore. The First Western Asiatic Games was celebrated in Delhi in 1934 at the Irwin Amphitheater, in which four countries—Afghanistan, British India, Palestine Mandate and Ceylon—participated. The decision was made to hold these Games once in four years at midpoint between the two successive Summer Olympics. The 1938 Western Asiatic Games were scheduled to be held in Tel Aviv, Palestine Mandate. However, the Games was cancelled due to the outbreak of World War II, and abandoned until 1951 Games, which also considered as the revival of Western Asiatic Games.

== Host city selection ==
Location of Delhi in India

On 12 and 13 February 1949, a meeting was organized at the Patiala House, in Delhi, in between the representatives of nine Asian National Olympic Committees. The framework of the meeting was set up in another meeting held on 8 August 1948 during the Second London Olympics, which was called by the Indian Olympic Committee's representative Guru Dutt Sondhi. The meeting was chaired by Yadavindra Singh, president of the Indian Olympic Association. On the last day, Asian Games Federation (AGF)^{[b]} was formalized and a draft constitution was accepted. HRH Yadavindra Singh and Guru Dutt Sondhi were respectively elected as the first president and the secretary of the federation. The five charter members forming the federation were Afghanistan, Burma, India, Pakistan, and the Philippines. The decision was made to organize the Asian Games Championships in four-year intervals since the inception of the Games in Delhi in February, 1950. HRH Yadavindra Singh, who also became the president of the organization committee of Games sent the formal invitation to several other Asian countries to participate in the 1950 Asian Games.

== Organization ==
The responsibility of organizing the First Asian Games was assigned to a special committee that included Anthony de Mello; the Maharaja of Patiala/ president of the Indian Olympic Association Yadavindra Singh; Indian Olympic Association Secretary Guru Dutt Sondhi; and officials playing a key role such as S. Bhoot, Nariman Saugar who did much work with the stadium, and others.

The Organizing Committee was:

President: Yadavindra Singh, Maharaja of Patiala;
Director: Anthony de Mello; Hon. Treasurer: S.P. Chopra;
Members: General K. M. Cariappa, Sir Girja Shankar Bajpai / ICS, Nawab of Pataudi, Maharajakumar of Visianagaram, S. V. Mavlankar, Pt. Hirday Nath Kunzru, K. R. K. Menon / ICS, Shankar Prasad / ICS, P. C. Choudhuri / ICS, Krishna Prasada / ICS, Dr. Tara Chand, Prof A. N. Jha, Sir Usha Nath Sen, Sir Biren Mukerjee, Sir Shankar Lal, Naval H. Tata, Sir Sobha Singh, Maj.Gen. V. R. Khanolkar, G.D.Sondhi, S.M. Moin-ul Haq, Raja Bhalindra Singh, Maharajadhiraj Sir Uday Chand Mahtab, C.C. Abraham, S.H. Bhoot, P. Gupta.

The Executive Committee was:

Chairman: G. D. Sondhi; Members: P. C. Choudhuri, Krishna Prasada, Moin-ul Haq, S.S. Mathur, Rameshwar Dayal.

The Chairmen of Committees were:

Finance: K.R.K. Menon; Technical: G.D. Sondhi; Housing and Transport: Maj. Gen. V.R.Khanolkar; Medical: Maj. M. S. Chadha; Arts: B. Ukil; Reception: Shankar Lal; Publicity: Deva Das Gandhi

The principal Executive members were:
Director of Organisation Anthony de Mello; Secretary to the Director S.S. Dhawan; Public Relations Officer M. L. Kapur; Publicity Officer D. I. Sequeira; Assistant Secretary Nariman S. Saugar.

An athletes' camp was settled in Delhi, modelled after the Richmond Park Camp of London, which accommodated athletes of the 1948 Summer Olympics.

== Venues ==
The venue for the 1951 Asian Games was the Irwin Amphitheater, a multi-purpose sport complex, the same venue which had hosted the 1934 Western Asiatic Games. Before the opening ceremony of the Games, the stadium was re-christened as the "National Stadium" and renovated for the facilities of different events of the Games. Every event with the exception of swimming and water polo was hosted under the premises of the main stadium only, the events of swimming and water polo were organised at the adjacent swimming pool within the premises of the complex.

The stadium was designed by Anthony S. DeMello and five-hundred thousand (500,000) rupees were required for the full construction, which was completed on 13 February 1933. The stadium was named after the Lord Irwin, 30th viceroy of India and the then Secretary of State for War.

== Events ==
The Games featured six sports: Athletics, aquatics—broken into Diving, swimming, and water polo disciplines—basketball, cycling—road cycling and track cycling—football, and weightlifting. The sports were broken down into 57 events. Many member countries of Asian Games Federation requested for the inclusion of boxing as a medal sport, but due to various reasons, boxing did not make the final list for the Games. Except athletics, women did not participate in any other event.

In the Games, "Mr. Asia of 1951" was also contested as the non-medal event. The contingents were judged on the basis of their physical development, looks, and personality. Parimal Roy of India won the event ahead of Mahmoud Namjoo of Iran, who won gold medal in the bantamweight category of weightlifting.

=== Aquatics ===
==== Diving ====
In diving, two medal events—3 m springboard and 10 m platform—were included. India and Iran were the only nations that achieved medals. Indian diver, K. P. Thakkar won both the golds and overall India won 4 medals. Iran bagged only one silver and one bronze.

==== Swimming ====
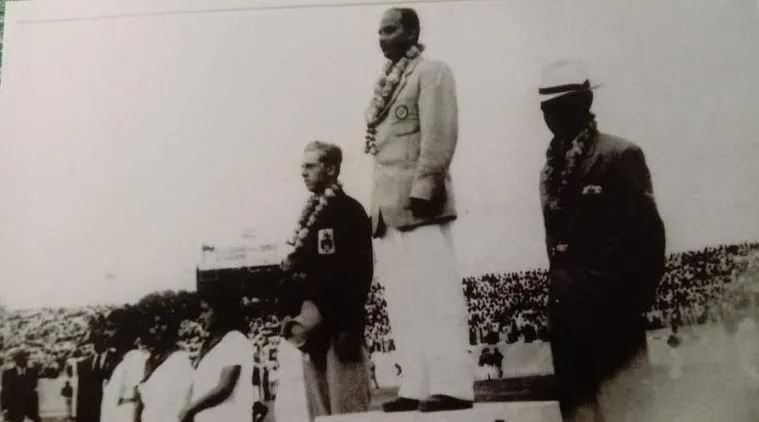
Sachin Nag, the first ever Asian Games gold medalist for India, standing on podium for medal ceremony at 1951 Asian Games.

In swimming, five nations sent their swimmers to participate in 8 events, 5 of freestyle (100 m, 400 m, 800 m, 1500 m, and 4 × 100 m relay) and one of each backstroke (100 m), breaststroke (200 m) and medley (3 × 100 m). After these Games, 800 m freestyle and 3 × 100 m medley relay were removed from the swimming calendar of Asian Games. Singapore bagged half of gold medals and 2 silvers, while Philippines earned half of total medals including 3 golds, India finished with 6 total medals including one gold of Sachin Nag in 100 m freestyle, which was the first gold of India in Asian Games; two nations left without any medal.

==== Water polo ====
In water polo, only two teams—India and Singapore—participated. The only match of the tournament decided the winner, in which the Indian team defeated Singapore with a goal difference of 6 to 4.

=== Athletics ===
Athletics was the only sport in which all the eleven participating nations sent their athletes. The Games featured 24 medal events for men and 9 for women. Japanese women won all the 9 golds of their events and just lost four silvers to India and Singapore, two for each. In men's events, again Japan achieved highest number of golds with count of 11, but here Indian athletes finished just one medal behind to Japan with 10 golds. Toyoko Yoshino, a Japanese woman athlete, won all the golds in three throwing sports— shot put, discus throw, and javelin throw. Lavy Pinto of India was the only man who achieved multiple gold medals, he finished at the top podium in men's 100 m and 200 m sprint running events.

=== Basketball ===
In basketball, five Asian teams—Burma, India, Iran, Japan, and Philippines—participated. In the matches, the round-robin format was employed and on the basis of final points table top three podium places were decided. Philippines team without losing a single match topped the points table and grabbed a gold medal, Japan team finished behind it and won a silver medal, Iranian team with two wins finished third and won a bronze. Host nation India, finished fourth with only single win over Burma, which came last without winning a single match.

=== Cycling ===
1. Asiad Cyclists group photo.

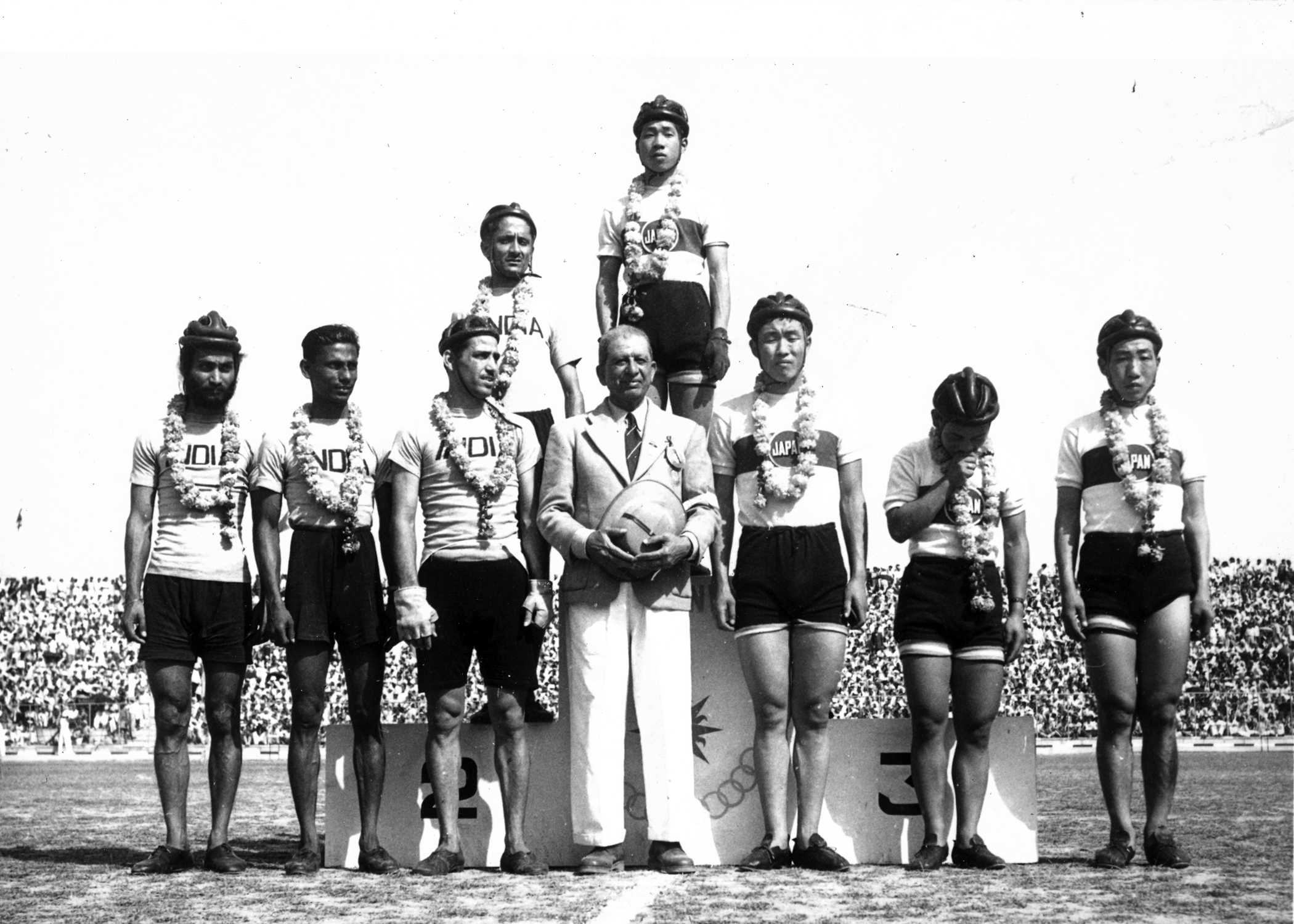
2. Winning Japanese and Indian team on podium for medal ceremony.

In cycling, four nations—Burma, India, Iran, and Japan—sent their cyclists. Two disciplines—road race and track race—were contested. Track cycling included—1000 m sprint, 1000 m time trial, and 4000 team-pursuit; for road cycling, 180 km individual road race was contested. The event was widely perceived as being dominated by Japan, who claimed 8 medals in total, including all the four golds out of 11 total overall medals and 4 golds. Indian cyclists won all the rest 3 medals as Burma and Iran failed to achieve a single one.

=== Football ===
In football, six Asian teams—Afghanistan, Burma, India, Indonesia, Iran, and Japan—participated. The gold medal was won by the Indian team, who defeated Iran 1–0 in the final. Japan defeated Afghanistan, 2–0 to win the bronze medal. In semifinals, two matches were played in between Iran and Japan to decide one of the finalists, as first match played on 7 March remained goalless, even match went for overtime; on a next day a replay semifinal match was played in between both the teams in which Iran defeated Japan with a goal difference of 3 to 2.

=== Weightlifting ===
In weightlifting, seven countries participated in seven events—bantamweight (56 kg), featherweight (60 kg), lightweight (67.5 kg), middleweight (75 kg), light heavyweight (82.5 kg), middle heavyweight (90 kg), and heavyweight (+90 kg). Iranian weightlifters dominated in all events and claimed 10 medals in total including all the golds, Singapore won two silvers, while both India and Philippines won one silver and one bronze.

== Calendar ==
In the following calendar for the 1951 Asian Games, each blue box represents an event competition, such as a qualification round, on that day. The yellow boxes represent days during which medal-awarding finals for a sport were held. The numeral indicates the number of event finals for each sport held that day. On the left, the calendar lists each sport with events held during the Games, and at the right, how many gold medals were won in that sport. There is a key at the top of the calendar to aid the reader.

OC	Opening ceremony	●	Event competitions	1	Event finals	CC	Closing ceremony

March 1951	4th Sun	5th Mon	6th Tue	7th Wed	8th Thu	9th Fri	10th Sat	11th Sun	Gold medals
Ceremonies	OC							CC	
Athletics					4	3	13	13	33
Basketball		●	●	●	●	●	1		1
Cycling – Road								1	1
Cycling – Track			1		●	1	1		3
Diving							1	1	2
Football		●		●	●	●	1		1
Swimming		2	3	3					8
Water polo								1	1
Weightlifting		1	2	2	2				7
Total gold medals		3	6	5	6	4	17	16	57
March 1951	4th Sun	5th Mon	6th Tue	7th Wed	8th Thu	9th Fri	10th Sat	11th Sun	Gold medals

== Opening ceremony ==
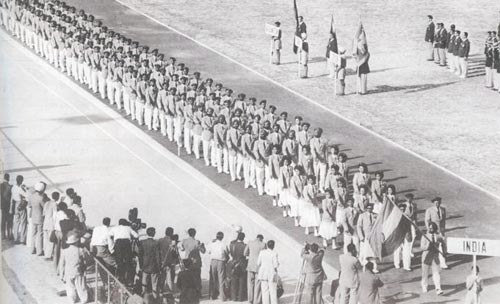
Indian athletes marching into the stadium.

On 4 March 1951, the First Asian Games were officially opened. The list of the guests included— India's first President Rajendra Prasad, first Prime Minister of India Jawaharlal Nehru, cabinet members of Indian Government, diplomatic corps and representatives of participating Asian NOCs. The National Stadium was filled with an estimated 40,000 spectators. A 31-gun salute was fired from the ramparts of the Purana Quila, adjacent to the National Stadium, in the honour of guests and participants of first Asian Games. After a speech by the president of Asian Games Federation, HRH Yadavendra Singh, President Rajendra Prashad officially opened the Games.

The first Asian Games will promote the realisation of understanding and friendship among all nations and will start a process which, as time passes, will go on cementing the friendly ties between the peoples of Asia.

— President Rajendra Prasad

Prime Minister Nehru presented his speech from which organisers of the Games adopted the official motto of the Games— "Play the game, in the spirit of the game". Fifteen of the Indian army's trumpeters with flags of eleven participating countries on their mastheads gave their performance. In an alphabetical order of English, athletes of the participating countries of the 1951 Asiad entered in the stadium with a march past, by following the custom of Olympics; India entered last as the host nation. The Lighting of the Cauldron was done by the 1924 Olympian of India, Dalip Singh with the help of Asian Games torch, which had been lit by the sun's rays in the Red Fort. Afterwards, Baldev Singh, a member of the Indian athletics squad, recited the athlete's oath on behalf of all competitors at the Games.

== Participating nations ==
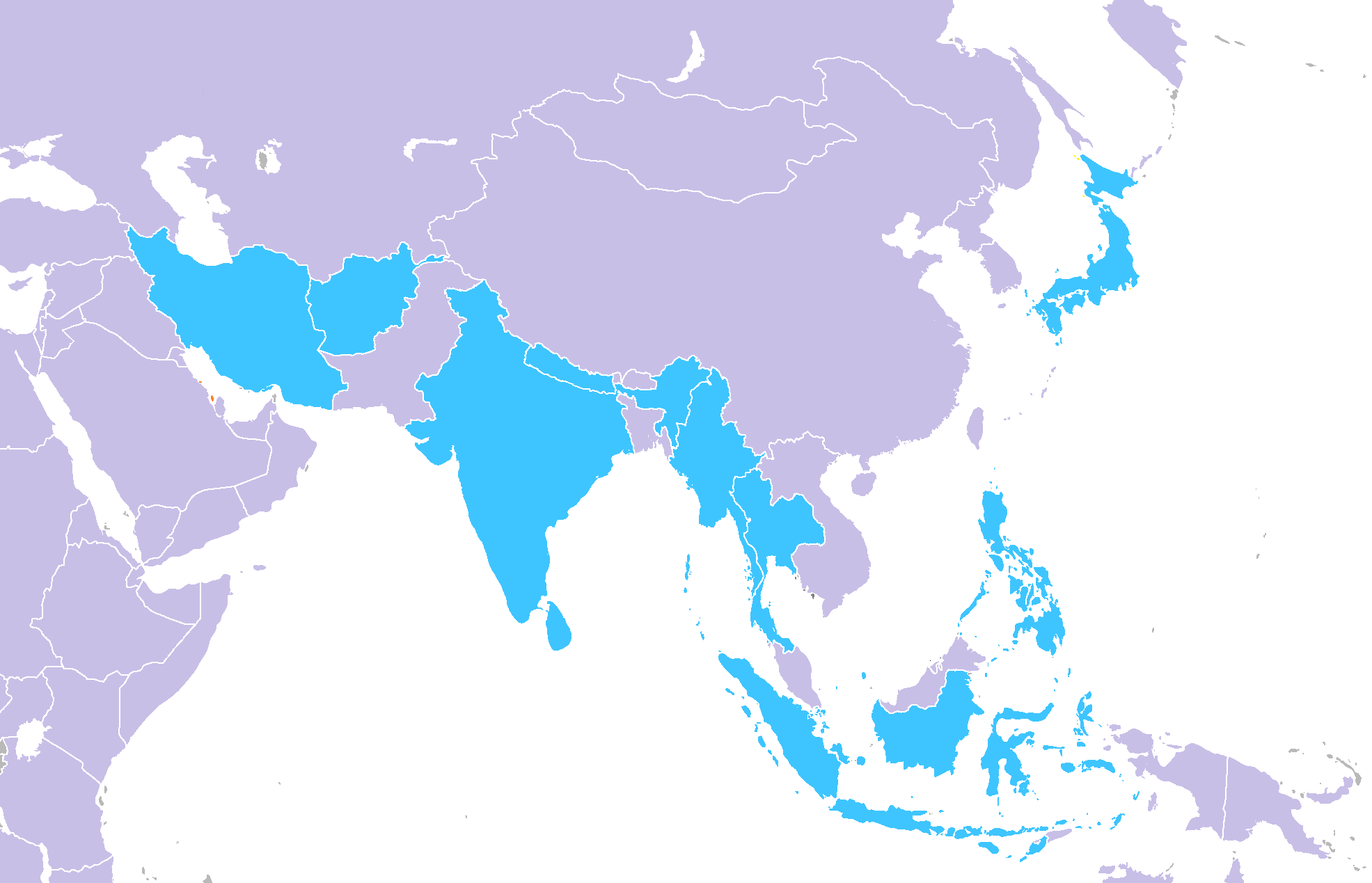
Participating countries

The 1951 Asiad featured athletes representing 11 National Olympic Committees. The Organising Committee of the Games sent the formal invitations to almost all the Asian countries. China was invited, but did not respond before the closing dates for entries. Pakistan declined to participate because of the Kashmir conflict with India. South Korea attended the meeting of Olympic representatives of Asian countries, held on 8 August 1948, during the London Olympics and agreed to send athletes for Games to participate but did not send any because of the Korean War. The Soviet Union and Vietnam were not invited because of their political systems. Japan was neither invited to the 1948 Summer Olympics nor to attend the founding meeting of Asian Games Federation held in February 1949 in Delhi, but allowed to participate in these Games. Japan sent a 72-member strong team, the second largest after the host, and participated in all except aquatics events. Burma and India sent their contingents in all the events. Iran participated in all events, but did not send any female athletes. Below is a list of all the participating NOCs; the number of competitors per delegation is indicated in brackets:

- Afghanistan (22)
- Burma (58)
- Ceylon (3)
- India (151)
- Indonesia (35)
- Iran (49)
- Japan (72)
- Nepal (8)
- Philippines (59)
- Singapore (20)
- Thailand (12)

Number of athletes by National Olympic Committees (by highest to lowest)

IOC Letter Code	Country	Athletes
IND	India	151
JPN	Japan	72
PHI	Philippines	59
BIR	Burma	58
IRI	Iran	49
INA	Indonesia	35
AFG	Afghanistan	22
SIN	Singapore	20
THA	Thailand	12
NEP	Nepal	8
CEY	Ceylon	3

== Medal table ==
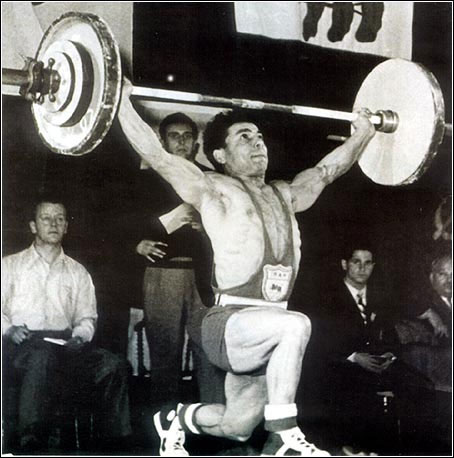
Mahmoud Namjoo of Iran won a gold medal in the Bantamweight (56 kg) category of weightlifting.

Athletes from eight participating NOCs won at least one medal, five of them winning at least one gold medal. Athletes from Japan earned the highest number of gold medals (24) and the most overall medals (60). Host nation India finished second with 15 golds and 51 overall medals as well as the most bronzes (20). Through 2010, it would be the best rank achieved by India in medal table in all succeeding Asian Games. Iran finished third with 8 golds and 16 overall medals. Three NOCs, Afghanistan, Nepal, and Thailand failed to earn any medals. Singaporean swimmer Neo Chwee Kok earned the honour of winning the first gold medal in the history of the Asian Games. He won a total of four golds, all in the free style events (400m, 800m, 1500m, and 4 × 100m relay); becoming the most medalled athlete in this Games.

The ranking in this table is consistent with International Olympic Committee convention in its published medal tables. By default, the table is ordered by the number of gold medals the athletes from a nation have won (in this context, a nation is an entity represented by a National Olympic Committee). The number of silver medals is taken into consideration next, and then the number of bronze medals. If nations are still tied, equal ranking is given; they are listed alphabetically by IOC country code.

A total of 169 medals (57 gold, 57 silver and 55 bronze) were awarded. The total number of bronze medals is less than the total number of gold or silver medals because bronze medals were not awarded in water polo and the team pursuit event of track cycling.

* Host nation (India)

Rank	Nation	Gold	Silver	Bronze	Total
1	Japan (JPN)	24	21	15	60
2	India (IND)*	15	16	20	51
3	Iran (IRN)	8	6	2	16
4	Singapore (SIN)	5	7	2	14
5	Philippines (PHI)	5	6	8	19
6	Ceylon (CEY)	0	1	0	1
7	Indonesia (INA)	0	0	5	5
8	Burma (BIR)	0	0	3	3
Totals (8 entries)		57	57	55	169

== See also ==
- 1982 Asian Games, also celebrated in India
- 2010 Commonwealth Games, also celebrated in India
- 2030 Commonwealth Games, also celebrated in India
- List of IOC country codes

== Notes and references ==
=== Notes ===
- ^{a} Yadavindra Singh was also the only Rajpramukh (equivalent to Governor) of Patiala and East Punjab States Union (PEPSU).
- ^{b} The Asian Games Federation was succeeded by the Olympic Council of Asia (OCA), which was formed in Delhi during the Asian Games Federation Council meeting on 26 November 1981.

=== References ===
Preceded by Far Eastern Games	Asian Games; New Delhi; I Asian Games (1951)	Succeeded by Manila
