= Abhiruchi Sports Day =

Sports Day of Assam

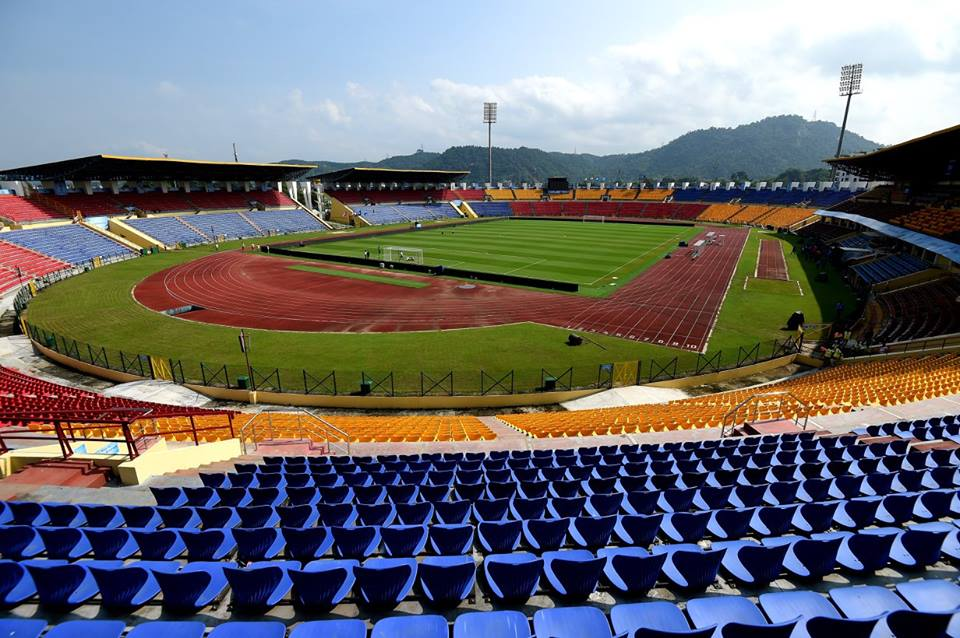
- Indira Gandhi Athletic Stadium pictured in 2017, where Abhiruchi Sports Day events are often held
- Official name: Abhiruchi Sports Day
- Also called: Abhiruchi Kriya Divas
- Observed by: Assam
- Type: Sports day
- Significance: Recognition of Bhogeswar Baruah and other Assamese athletes
- Celebrations: Sports activities and physical exercises Awarding of state sports awards Group dances Traditional games in schools
- Date: 3 September
- Duration: 1 day/2 days
- Frequency: Annual
- First time: 3 September 1984
- Started by: Abhiruchi magazine; Balendra Mohan Chakravarty

Abhiruchi Sports Day, also known as Abhiruchi Krira Divas, is the state sports day of Assam which has been held annually on 3 September since 1984. It commemorates the achievements of Bhogeswar Baruah, the first Assamese sportsperson to win the Arjuna Award, and exists to celebrate the success of sportspersons, encourage young athletes and promote sports in the state. Thousands participate in the events and activities held annually, and the day has been attended by various athletes and political figures.

== History and context ==
=== Bhogeswar Baruah ===
Bhogeswar Baruah is an Indian athlete. He began his athletics career through his entry to the Indian Army Corps of Electronics and Mechanical Engineers (EME). He made his first national athletics appearance in 1963 and in the subsequent few years he became the Indian national champion in the 800 metres. At the 1966 Asian Games, Baruah won gold in the 800 metres by running a time of 1:49.4, setting a new Asian Games record. In the 1970 Asian Games, he won a silver medal in the 4 x 400 metres relay.

Baruah was awarded the Arjuna Award in 1966, becoming the first Assamese recipient of the award. He also received the Lachit award in 2015 and the Bir Chilarai Award in 2019.

=== Origins ===
After Baruah's retirement, he became a driver in the Oil and Natural Gas Corporation (ONGC). This came to the attention of Balendra Mohan Chakravarty, who was the editor of the Abhiruchi magazine. Chakravarty published an article condemning ONGC for giving the post of a driver to Baruah and described it as deeply shameful for the state (due to Baruah being the first Assamese Arjuna award recipient), and also petitioned the president of India and Member of Parliament (MP) Dinesh Chandra Goswami. Following the controversy, ONGC shifted post of Sports Officer from Dehradun to Sibsagar and appointed Baruah to the position in 1983.

Chakravarty and Abhiruchi magazine later decided that they would honour Baruah by celebrating his birthday as "Abhiruchi sports day", as Chakravarty assessed that most Assamese people were not aware of who Baruah was or his achievements. The 3 September in the English calendar became the date for the day, after Baruah consulted his relatives for his birthdate. The first Abhiruchi sports day was subsequently held on 3 September 1984. Chakravarty later became the managing director and chairman of the organising committee of the day.

== Observance ==
=== Purpose and activities ===
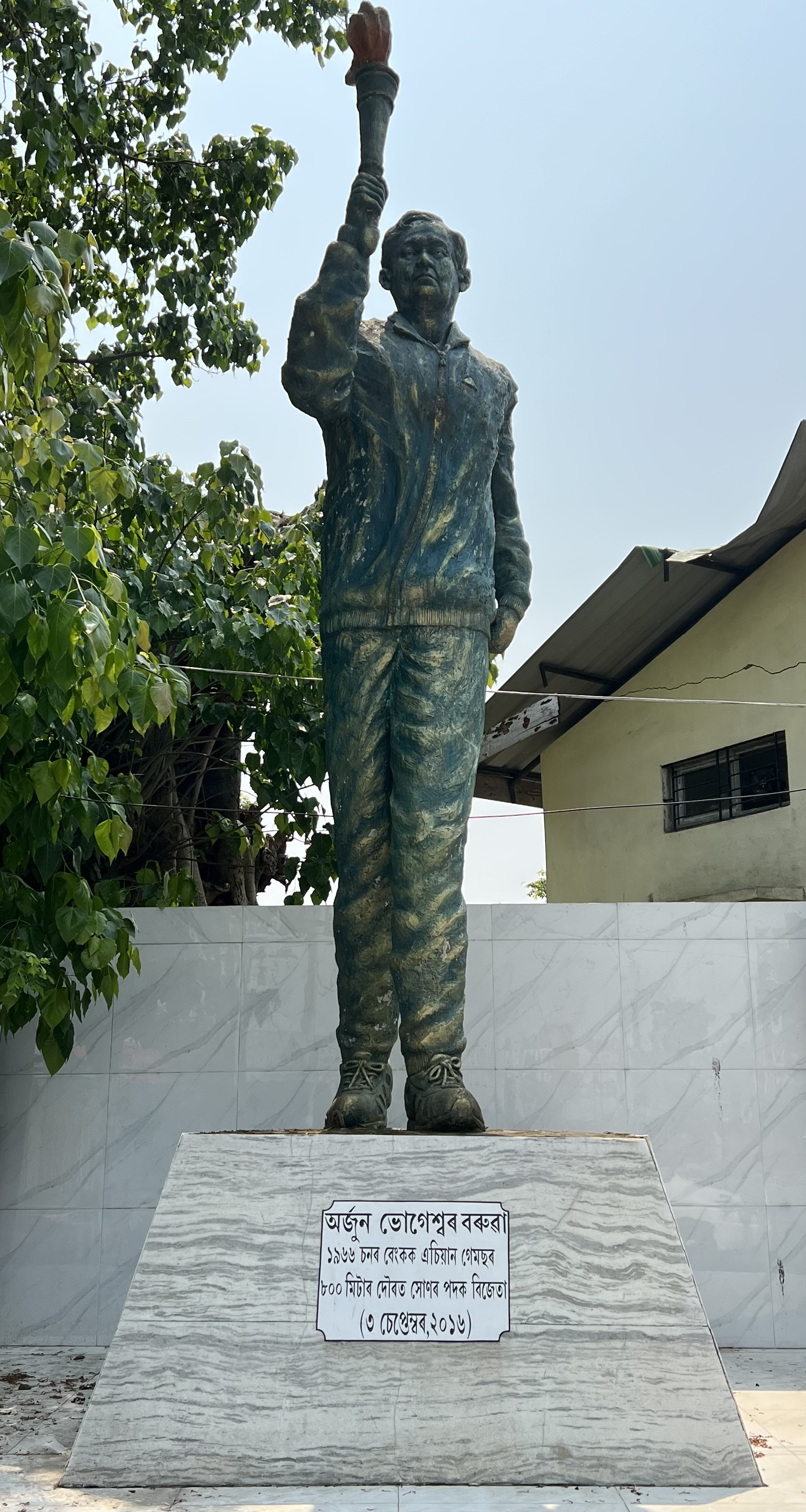
A gamosa was laid on the statue of Baruah in Sibsagar (pictured) for Abhiruchi sports day in 2024.

The day is held to commemorate Baruah, but also to promote sports and encourage young athletes in the state, with Baruah himself stating that inspiring young athletes would bring more "laurels" to the state. On the 42nd Abhiruchi sports day, Sports Minister Nandita Garlosa assessed that while many young students would not have seen Baruah in his prime, the celebration would allow them to "witness and draw inspiration from his journey". Cricketeer Anjum Chopra said that the events in the Abhiruchi sports day would "definitely boost youngsters" in taking up sports seriously.

Activities for the sports day vary, but frequently there is a mass jogging event from Chandmari Flyover to the Nehru Stadium in Guwahati. Other activities include participation by schools in group dances and physical training exercises and drills, cycle rallies, and felicitations of sportspeople. In 2016, half-marathons were also introduced as part of the state-wide activities. Sports quizzes and felicitation ceremonies for coaches and organisers are also held across Assam. Further local activities in schools include traditional sports games including kabaddi, musical chairs and cockfighting competitions. A Gamosa has also been laid on the statue of Baruah in Sibsagar on the day in his honour.

Felicitations during the day are of athletes from various sports including archery, fencing, sepak takraw, taekwondo, boxing, swimming, weightlifting, rowing, lawn bowls and badminton amongst other fields.

=== Selected days ===
==== 1st ====
The first Abhiruchi sports day took place on 3 September 1984, with the programme involving mass jogging led by Baruah with the participation of school students, college students, and citizens. The huge public support for the day led to the spread of the programmes state-wide and the central programme in Guwahati began to host athletes.

==== 24th ====
The 24th Abhiruchi sports day in 2007 took place in 104 places across the state saw over 5000 joggers run as part of the activities for the event. Baruah along with Monalisa Baruah Mehta and Kamlesh Mehta were the chief guests of the event. In the Abhiruchi awards, 26 sportsperson, four coaches and six heads of education institutions were bestowed honours. Mehta said at the event that Assam had developed world class infrastructure and could host future international events.

==== 37th ====
The 37th Abhiruchi sports day took place in 2020, but due to the COVID-19 Pandemic the normal events of mass jogging, dance competitions and athlete felicitation were postponed. Tayabun Nisha and Purnananda Baruah, brother of Bhogeswar Baruah, were among the chief guests at the function held at the Gauhati Press Club that was presided over by Chakravarty.

==== 38th ====
The 38th Abhiruchi sports day took place in 2021 also during the COVID-19 Pandemic, and events were again reduced. The cycle rally was held from Chandmari Flyover to the Nehru Stadium, and was flagged off by Minister Bimal Bora.

==== 40th ====
The 40th Abhiruchi sports day was held over a 2 day celebration, where the usual mass jogging event was held along with the sports quiz and the felicitation programme of athletes. Over 50 athletes from Assam were awarded honours in the ceremony, and the RG Baruah award was also bestowed in the 40th Abhiruchi sports day.

==== 42nd ====
The mass-running event was led by actress Barsha Rani Bishaya, and the first day of the events included inter-institutional dance and PT competitions held at the Deshbhakta Tarun Ram Phookan Indoor Stadium. On the second day, felicitation of numerous athletes was held.

=== Attendees ===
Athletes at the early Abhiruchi sports days included Milkha Singh in 1986, and Talimeren Ao and M.P. Ganesh in 1987. Since then, further athletes including Prakash Padukone, Kapil Dev, Ajit Wadekar, Shiny Wilson, Vandana Rao, Dutee Chand, Kunjarani Devi, Khajan Singh, Manohar Aich, Monika Devi, Anjum Chopra, and Praveen Kumar have all attended the event.

Political figures including successive Chief Ministers Tarun Gogoi, Sarbananda Sonowal, and Himanta Biswa Sarma have either attended or taken part in the activities of the sports day.

== Influence and legacy ==
=== Significance ===
Kamlesh Mehta described the Abhiruchi Sports Day as a "unique initiative", particularly as it honours Baruah in his lifetime. Chakravarty assessed in 2007 that the sports day had done enough to make Baruah a "familiar face in almost every household across the state."

Filmmaker Utpal Borpujari as a student participated in the first celebrations of the event, and also from 1986 to 1990 where he volunteered for the organising team. He stated in 2022 that he did not think anywhere else in India a sportsperson's birthday was celebrated as a state sports day, (the national sports day in India began 28 years after the Abhiruchi initiative in Assam).

Activities for the event still took place despite environment or political issues, including during floods and the COVID-19 Pandemic. The event has also been used to raise awareness of sports politically, with there being appeals to the government to provide further assistance to different sports organisations promoting sports in the state.

=== Cultural impacts ===
==== Promotion of sports for youth ====
At the 2007 Abhiruchi sports day, Chief Minister Tarun Gogoi called for special attention school-level sports, with there being many school children among the 5000 runners who participated in the events of the day.

Laishram Sarita Devi stated in the 2023 that the honouring of Baruah in the Abhriuchi sports day would help to "inspire the new generation to come into the sport". Olympic medalist Lovlina Borgohain counselled young athletes at the 2024 Abhiruchi sports day to put in effort to try to make their dreams into reality.

==== Athlete recognition ====
The Bhogeswar Baruah national sports awards were established in 2025, which were bestowed on the Abhiruchi Sports Day, in the categories of Best Sportsperson, Emerging Player and Lifetime Achievement at both national and Assam levels. Several notable Assamese athletes and dignitaries attended the inaugural ceremony of the sports awards including Lovlina Borgohain, Union Minister Sonowal and Chief Minister Sarma.

=== Economic influence ===
In 2016, the "Run Raise Respond" half-marathon was held during the Abhiruchi sports day which was used to raise funds for directly supporting local entrepreneurs and support flood relief activities in Northeast India.

== See also ==
- National Sports Day
