= Arjuna Bhogeswar Baruah Sports Complex =

Sports complex in Assam

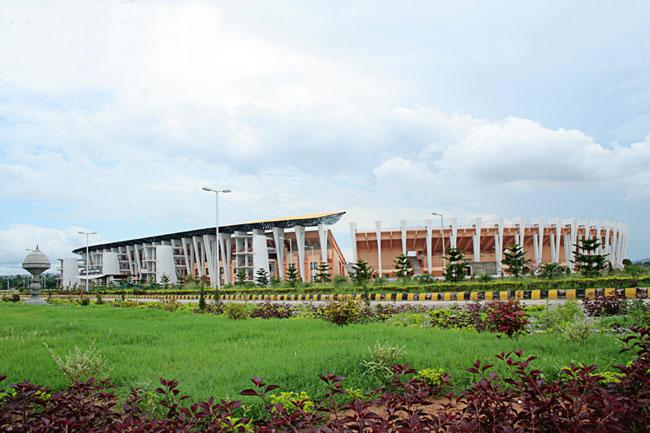
- Interactive map of Arjuna Bhogeswar Baruah Sports Complex
- Full name: Arjuna Bhogeswar Baruah Sports Complex
- Former names: Sarusajai Sports Complex
- Location: Sarusajai, Guwahati, Assam
- Owner: Government of Assam
- Main venue: Indira Gandhi Athletic Stadium; Capacity: 21,600
- Facilities: Maulana Md. Tayabullah Hockey Stadium

Construction
- Groundbreaking: 2 March 2004
- Cost: est.₹149 crore (US$15 million)
- Architect: STUP Consultants
- Main contractor: Larsen & Toubro

The Arjuna Bhogeswar Baruah Sports Complex, also known as the Bhogeswar Baruah stadium, formerly known as the Sarusajai Sports Complex, is a complex of sports facilities located in Sarusajai, Guwahati, Assam. It hosted the 2007 National Games, and was used for the lying-in-state of Zubeen Garg in 2025.

== History ==
=== Development and construction ===
The locality of Sarusajai won the bid to host the 2007 national games on 13 December 2002, though the sports infrastructure of the town was not able to accommodate the event. It marked the first time the games had ever been held in Assam and only the second time in the Northeast, after Manipur. French Architectural firm STUP consultants, which previously designed infrastructure for the Montreal Olympics and venues in the 2004 Athens Olympics, presented its designs to the government of Assam in 2003. President of the Indian Olympic Association, Suresh Kalmadi, Chief Minister Tarun Gogoi, and governor Ajai Singh laid the foundation stones for the athletics stadium, indoor hall, and aquatic stadium in December 2003. The project was spread over 369 bighas of land.

The state government engaged STUP consultants to design the infrastructure for the city, while the stadium construction was completed by Larsen & Toubro. The development project for the turfing of the football ground was a collaborative effort between the soil conservation department and STUP consultants, and the landscaping and plantation project was delayed due to Larsen & Toubro being unable to clear some of the sites. Larsen & Toubro began construction of the stadium on 2 March 2004, on the basis of designs prepared by STUP consultants.

Despite concerns over parts of the complex being still constructed in the days before the games, the complex was ready for the opening of the 2007 games. In 2012, The Telegraph reported that the complex had cost ₹149 crore (US$15 million), and that there had been "negligible" use of the infrastructure since the 2007 games.

In March 2020, bodybuilder Mahadev Deka inaugurated the gym and fitness centre at the sports complex.

=== Use ===
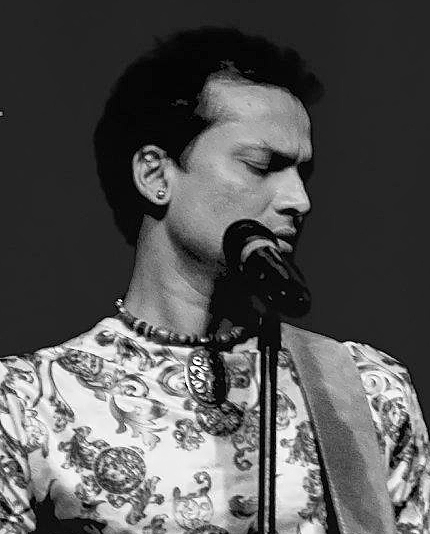
The body of legendary Assamese singer Zubeen Garg (pictured) lay in state at the complex in 2025.

The complex has hosted 2007 National Games, 2016 South Asian Games, 2020 Khelo India Youth Games, 2024 Khelo India University Games and Khel Maharan. During the COVID-19 pandemic, the open area in the indoor stadium was converted to become care centres for COVID.

The Athletic Stadium is currently home to NorthEast United and Inter Kashi while the Indoor Stadium hosted the Northeastern Warriors. In September 2025, the complex was used for the lying in state of Assamese singer Zubeen Garg.

=== Renaming ===
On 28 May 2025, the Assam government under Chief Minister Himanta Biswa Sarma approved the renaming of the Sarusajai Sports Complex, to be named after legendary Assamese athlete, Bhogeswar Baruah. During Abhiruchi Sports Day on 3 September, the sports complex was formally renamed, with Sarma stating that he felt "privileged" to rename the stadium in Baruah's honour.

=== Future ===
In February 2017, Finance Minister Himanta Biswa Sarma announced that the Assam government would create the Arjuna Bhogeswar Baruah State Sports Academy, and proposed ₹5 crore (US$520,000) for the building of the school, using the infrastructure of the sports complex.

In 2019, Chief Minister Sarbananda Sonowal laid the foundation stones for the state sports school named after Baruah to be located at the sports complex. The school is set to be built on 20 bighas of land and will have a focus on six disciplines: athletics, football, boxing, weightlifting, archery, and taekwondo.

== Facilities ==
=== Sports venues ===
Venues in the Arjun Bhogeswar Baruah Sports Complex.
- Venues
- 1 Athletic Stadium
- 2 Aquatic Complex
- 3 Indoor Stadium
- 4 Hockey Stadium
- 5 Lawn Bowls Green

No.	Venue	Events	Capacity
1	Indira Gandhi Athletic Stadium	Football, Athletics	30,000
2	Dr Zakir Hussain Aquatic Complex	Swimming	1,500
3	Karmabir Nabin Chandra Bordoloi Indoor Stadium	Basketball, Handball, Chess	2,000
4	Maulana Md. Tayabullah Hockey Stadium	Hockey	2,000
5	Lawn Bowls Green	Bowls	

=== Other facilities ===
A gym and fitness centre at the sports complex was opening in March 2020. Various stadiums in the complex also hold VIP rooms and media rooms.

== Design and architecture ==
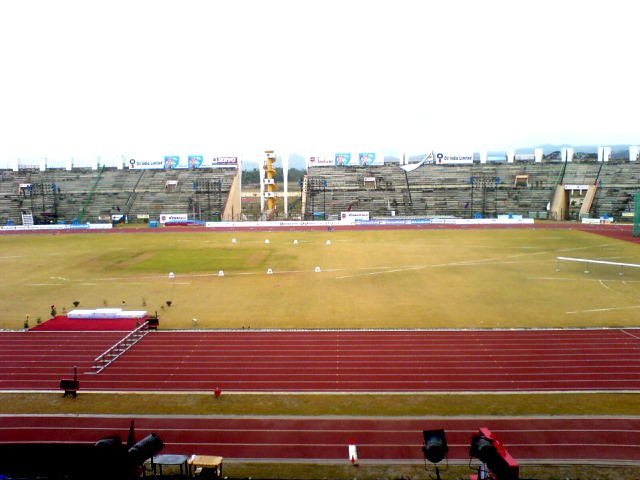
Sarusajai stadium in 2007

=== Sarusajai stadium ===
The Sarusajai stadium has an eight-lane synthetic track, as well as facilities for fields events including the long jump, triple jump and high jump.

=== Hockey stadium ===
The Maulana Md. Tayabullah Hockey Stadium was designed to have a capacity of 2,000 people, and has a synthetic turf in the main field and half of the practice field, and also has high mast lights.

== Events ==
The Arjuna Bhogeswar Baruah Sports Complex has held various events since 2007.

Sporting events at the NGAC Sports Complex
Date	Event name	Facilities (within complex)	Ref
9–18 February 2007	2007 National Games of India	Indira Gandhi Athletic Stadium	
5 February 2016	2016 South Asian Games	Indira Gandhi Athletic Stadium	
October 2017	2017 FIFA U-17 World Cup	Indira Gandhi Athletic Stadium	
3–4 February 2018	Assam Global Investors' Summit	Indira Gandhi Athletic Stadium	
10 January 2020	2020 Khelo India Youth Games	Indira Gandhi Athletic Stadium	
15 February 2020	65th Filmfare Awards	Indira Gandhi Athletic Stadium	
21–22 September 2025	Lying in state of Zubeen Garg	Sports Complex	

== See also ==
- List of sports venues named after individuals
- Bhogeswar Baruah National Sports Awards
