= Bhogeswar Baruah =

Indian former-athlete and coach

Havildar Bhogeswar Baruah
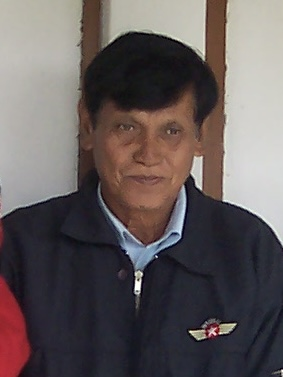
- Baruah in 2006

Personal information
- Nationality: Assamese; Indian
- Born: 3 September 1940 (age 86) Sibsagar, Assam Province (now Assam)
- Monuments: Abhiruchi Sports Day; Arjuna Bhogeswar Baruah Sports Complex; Statue in Sibsagar; Arjun Bhogeswar Baruah State Sports Academy; Bhogeswar Baruah National Sports Awards
- Occupations: Athlete; coach; military driver
- Spouse: Renu Baruah
- Children: 3 (1 deceased)
- Parents: Bhodraswar Baruah (father); Aikon Baruah (mother)
- Military career
- Allegiance: India
- Branch: Indian Army
- Service years: 1960–c.1976
- Rank: Havildar
- Unit: EME
- Awards: Arjuna Award (1966); Lachit Award (2015); Bir Chilarai Award (2019)

Sport
- Country: India
- Sport: Athletics
- Events: 800 metres; 400 metres; 4 x 400 metres relay
- Coached by: Surya Narayan; Ilyas Babar

Achievements and titles
- Personal bests: 800 m: 1:49.4 GR (Bangkok, 1966); 4 x 400 m: 3:11.9 (Bangkok, 1970)
Medal record
Men's athletics
Representing India
Asian Games
Gold medal – first place	1966 Bangkok	800 m
Silver medal – second place	1970 Bangkok	4 × 400 m

Bhogeswar Baruah (born 3 September 1940) is an Indian former athlete, coach, and military driver. He is the first recipient of the Arjuna award from Assam and Northeast India. At the 1966 Asian Games, he won the 800 metres in 1:49.4, setting a games record. He later won a silver medal at the 1970 Asian Games as part of the Indian 4 x 400 metre relay team, which finished in 3:11.9.

Born in Sibsagar and raised near the Joysagar tank, Baruah joined the Indian Army Corps of Electronics and Mechanical Engineers (EME) as a driver in 1960. At the EME, he initially played football but later switched to athletics. Baruah made his first national appearance in 1963, where he was part of the 4 x 400 metre relay services team which won the All Indian Open Athletics Meet. The following year, he won the 400 metres and 800 metres at a Sri Lankan open athletics meeting. Baruah competed at the Asian Games in 1966 and 1970, and served on several Indian sporting committees. He retired from the army at the rank of Havildar, and worked for the Oil and Natural Gas Corporation (ONGC) until his retirement in 1998.

Since 1984, the "Abhiruchi Sports Day" has been celebrated on his birthday in his honour. He was the chef de mission of the Assam contingent at the 2007 national games, and was awarded the Bir Chilarai award in 2019. Chief Minister Sarbananda Sonowal laid the foundation stone for a state sports school in honour of Baruah in 2019, and in 2021 the state government under Himanta Biswa Sarma confirmed that Baruah's birthday would officially be celebrated as Assam's sports day. In 2025, a national sports award named after Baruah was created, and the Sarusajai sports complex was renamed the Arjuna Bhogeswar Baruah Sports Complex.

== Early life and education ==
=== Birth and family life ===
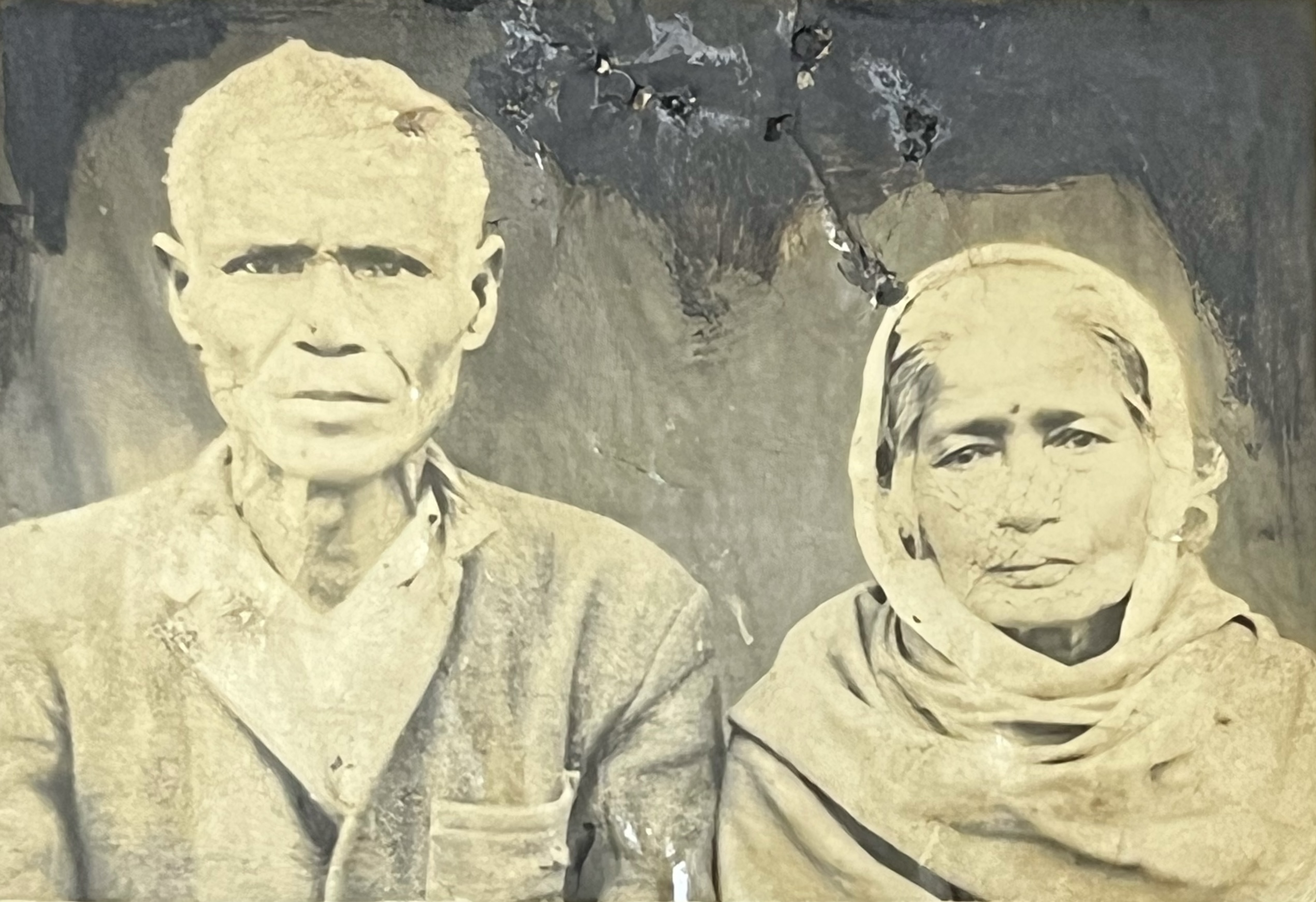
Baruah's parents: Bhodraswar (left) and Aikon Baruah (right).

Bhogeswar Baruah was born on 3 September 1940, the sixth of eight children born to Bhodraswar Baruah (c. 1889–1994) and Aikon Baruah (c. 1913–1983). His family's ancestral village was Thakurpara, which was about a kilometre west of the Joysagar tank Tini-Ali. The Archaeological Survey of India established its first office in Sibsagar in 1935; Baruah's father, Bhodraswar, joined the Joysagar office as a chowkidar (a Class IV employee). Due to the job, Baruah's parents moved from Thakurpara and built a small bamboo-and-thatch house by the Joysagar tank. The family received ration benefits because his father's job was a central government one. The old Thakurpara home was left to his uncles and an aunt, and Baruah was born at the Joysagar Tank house.

While growing up, Baruah often accompanied his father while he worked in the field. He later described his father a "calm and quiet" man, "devoted" to his work. Bhodraswar Baruah was uneducated, and in addition to his government job, he did all his farming himself. The family's total land was around fifteen bighas and Baruah's father also worked on leased land. Their work included ploughing, harvesting, sowing, and carrying bundles of paddy on their shoulders. Baruah's father was also a local village healer, who treated the sick with traditional Assamese herbal medicine; Baruah asserted that his father never accepted any money for this practice. His father was also fond of sports, and during the time of British rule where football matches and horse racing were often held at Nazira, he would often go to watch football. Baruah's mother, Aikon, handled both the household chores and farm work. He described her as an "expert weaver" who spun yarn, and wove chadors and blankets on the loom. Baruah himself helped her by collecting castor and keseru leaves for the silkworms. He also described her in his biography as strict and "strong-willed".

Baruah had two elder brothers, three elder sisters (two of whom were married before his birth), one younger sister, and one younger brother. The large Joysagar tank was beside their home, and Baruah stated that from around the age of 3 he taught himself to swim.

=== Childhood and education ===
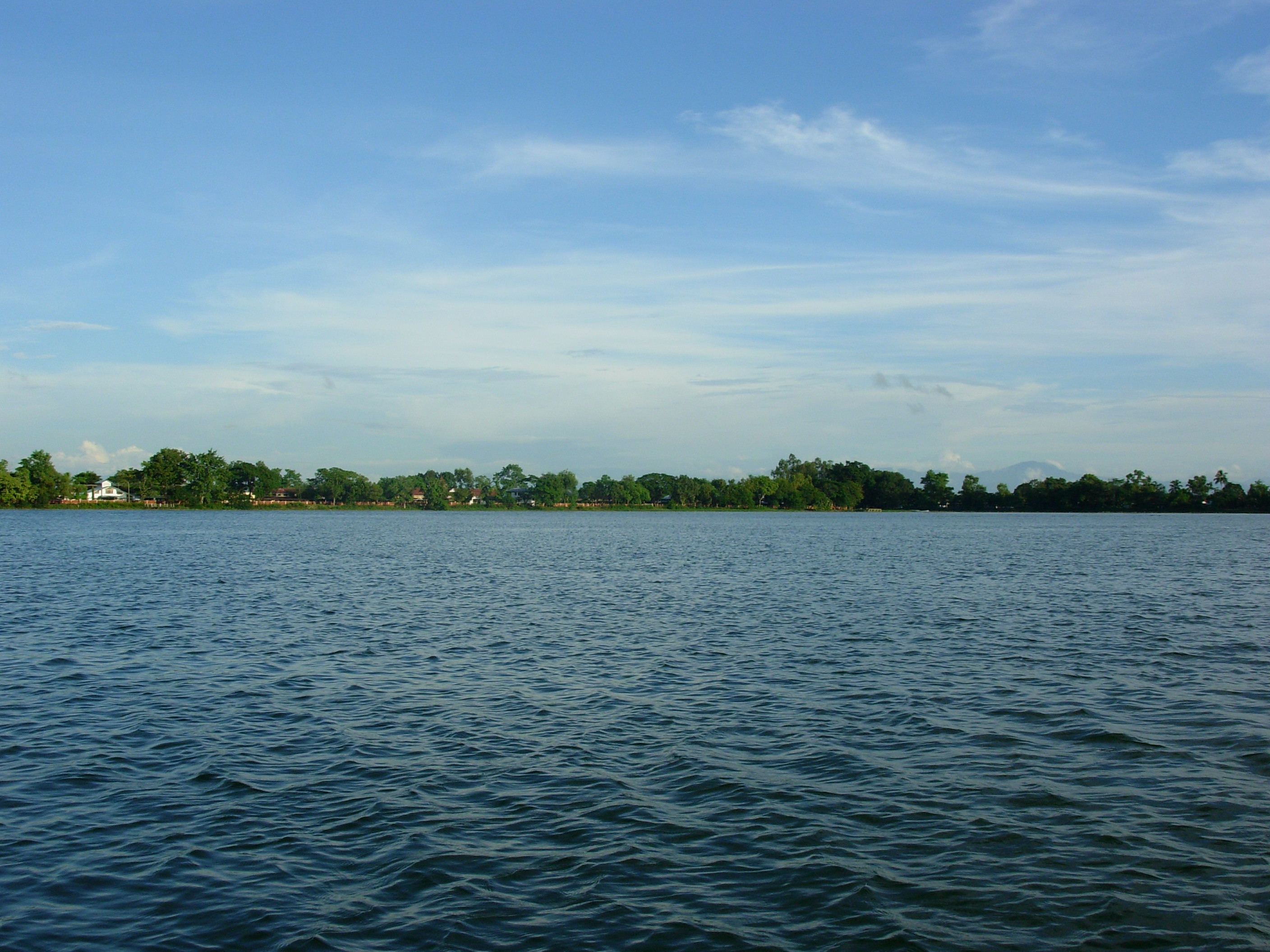
Joysagar tank, pictured in 2006

Baruah did not begin his education straightaway, and spent much of early childhood outdoors near the Joysagar tank. He was later enrolled at the Meteka primary school, which was the nearest one to him. His attendance at the school was irregular, as reaching the school required him to cross a big stream; bamboo bridges were only put up when it was dry so during monsoon season he had to travel by boat. A few years later, a school opened at Zolagaon, and he transferred there in Class III because it was closer. None of Baruah's elder sisters went to school, and of his two elder brothers: the older studied up to lower primary and the younger passed high school at Meteka.

After finishing at Zolagaon, Baruah joined Vidyapith school in Sibsagar town. At the school, he began to develop his interest in football. He became a right-sided defender, and played for the Sibsagar district at an Upper Assam Schools Tournament in Jorhat, where he competed against schools from Dibrugarh, Golaghat, Tinsukia and other areas. He later failed his matriculation exams, largely due to his focus on sports. Around the time of the second world war, he saw American soldiers fish, shoot, and drive; this later sparked an interest for him in joining the army. He learned to shoot a rifle by helping the American soldiers set up posts in the water, and learned how to drive from observing and copying how they used the clutch and gears in their jeeps.

== Military career ==
=== Initial work ===
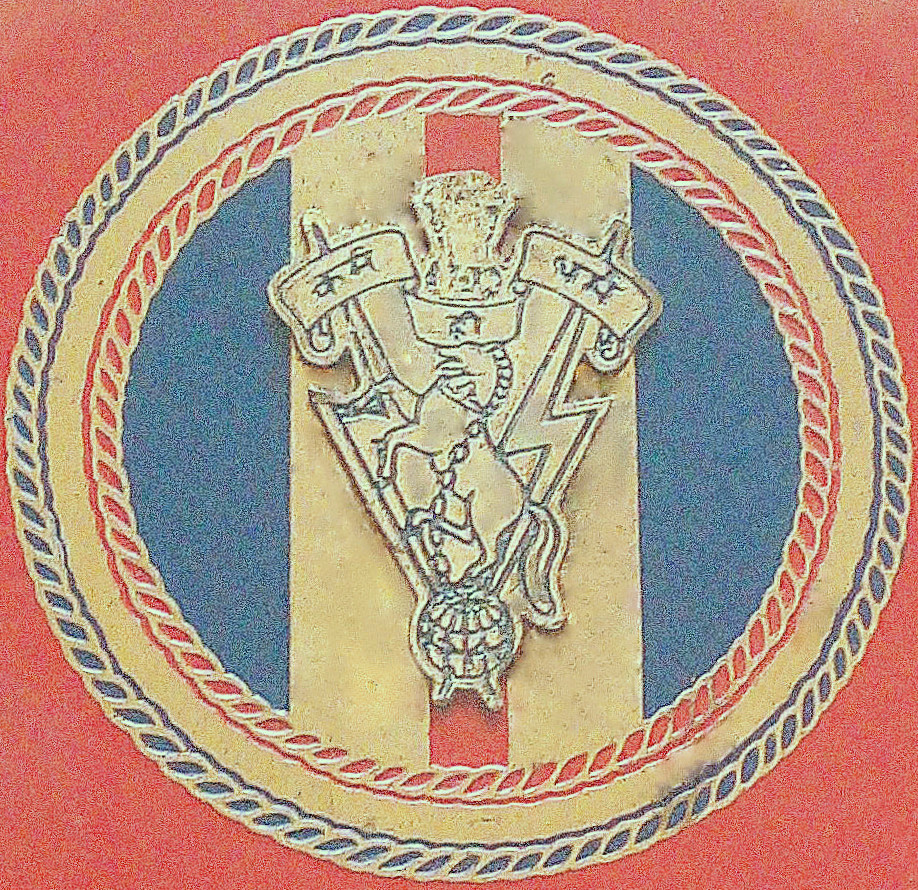
Crest of the EME

Despite having had ambitions to join the army for a long while, Baruah's military career began incidentally. In 1960, Baruah was hired to drive two men from Sibsagar to Jorhat, and he dropped them off in front of the Paradise hotel. Recruitment for the army was being held nearby in a field, and after watching the drills, Baruah was approached by an officer who asked him to join to which he agreed. He initially did not tell his father about the decision, though when he went home the same day he told his mother who accepted the choice when Baruah said that others were also joining.

Baruah was selected to become a driver for the Indian Army Corps of Electronics and Mechanical Engineers (EME) of the Indian Army in November 1960; the headquarters of the department were located at Secunderabad. During his first two months there, he did not undertake training activities such as army drills and parade routines, and instead focused on clean-up, maintenance and construction work.

The first stage of his basic training was platoon training. In this, he was taught drill commands and rifle-shooting training. After this, he completed the passing-out parade before he was posted to his unit. He did not undergo the full basic training schedule as he was training with the EME football team, and so only practiced for two days. Previously, Baruah observed the Home Guard training camp at the Joysagar tank where he observed the parade drills of the trainees, and had practiced rifle shooting with American soldiers. After passing the parade and being confirmed as a soldier, Baruah recounted that his allowances and facilities were improved.

=== Later years ===
Baruah was reluctant to inform his father that he joined the army since he was his father's main help in farming. Instead, Baruah decided to divide the time into two parts during the planting season and the harvest season, so that he could return home to help with farming. He did not take leave during festivals such as Bihu. During his military career, he returned home twice annually to assist his father with farming.

After three years, Baruah was promoted from a constable to a Havildar. He did not focus on promotion much initially, but after seeing others promoted later on in his career, he became more concerned. He subsequently decided to apply for a home-posting near Assam to plan for post-retirement life. His first home posting was in Dimapur, where he drove army trucks to transport supplies to different areas. In Dimapur, his concerns over promotion, combined with his second child being due, influenced his decision to take voluntary retirement and return to farming in his village. He retired at the rank of Havildar.

== Early sports career ==
=== Football ===
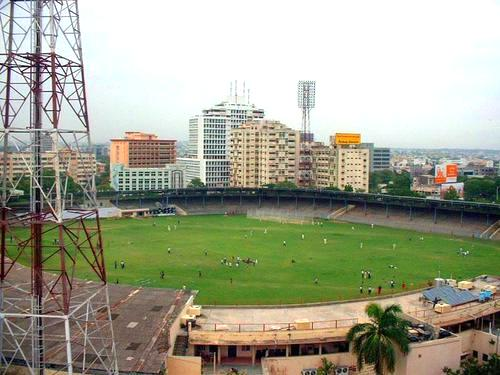
Baruah competed at the Lal Bahadur Shastri Stadium (pictured).

In the early stages of his military career, Baruah was often taken out to play different sports such as running, jumping, kabbadi, volleyball and football. He played as a right-sided defender in football and was later selected to join the main EME team. The main EME team also held matches against teams from the Air Force, AOC, and the P&T. Tarlok Singh, a former member of the Indian football team which won gold at the 1962 Asian games, was the captain of the team, and as there was no coach of the team, the training was supervised by senior players such as Singh. Baruah was selected at the right-back in the first eleven.

In 1962, the EME Secunderabad team went to Delhi to participate in the Durand cup where Baruah was in the starting eleven. It was the first time he had ever visited Delhi, and the team stayed at an army unit near the Red fort. In the team's first match, they defeated former champions, the Punjab police team. However, after a few days, the tournament was cancelled due to the Sino-Indian war. During the tournament, he met Talimeren Ao, captain of the first Indian national football team, and Indian international Sheoo Mewalal, both of whom would later work with Baruah as member of the India sports council. After their time at the Durand cup, they began playing practice matches against stronger local teams.

To participate in the Santosh trophy, Baruah attempted to qualify for the Andhra Pradesh state team which would allow him to participate in the tournament. For the selection of the state team, a special tournament was organised at the Lal Bahadur Shastri Stadium in Hyderabad, and the state team would be formed based on the performance of players in the tournament. The top five teams in the Hyderabad football league participated, and on the final day Baruah played against the Andhra Pradesh police team in a match which finished in a draw. After the end of the tournament, Baruah was not selected for the team, and attributed this experience as a contributing factor for his decision to move from team sports to an individual sport.

=== Transition to athletics ===
After leaving football, Baruah tried numerous other sports. Although he primarily focused on football, Baruah often entered other events during inter-platoon competitions including 400 metres, relay races, long jump and javelin throw. He also tried boxing and swimming.

Despite having never boxed before, he entered an inter-platoon competition. He reached the final, but was injured and hospitalised; later deciding not to take up boxing again. Baruah then leaned towards taking up swimming, where he met Bengali athlete and services member B.K. Dey. He advised Baruah that, in order to earn his colour service, he should take up athletics, and specifically the 400 metres. Under Dey's mentorship, Baruah trained during the off-season under Dey.

== Athletics career ==
=== Early career ===
Baruah began his running career with inter-platoon events, and won numerous 400 metres races. Then he began running in inter-department races between the army, navy and air force, where he again won the 400 metres as well as the relay. He finished second at the southern command meet which earned him a place at the Inter-Command championships in Pune, where the Northern, Eastern and Southern commands also competed. He finished third, earning a bronze medal, behind Makhan Singh who won the race. He later recalled that he was thrilled at winning a medal and his services colour within a year of switching from football.

Baruah's first national appearance came in 1963 at the All India Open Athletics Meet Relay in New Delhi. He was part of the services team, along with Makhan Singh, Ranjit Singh and another runner from the Jat Regiment, who competed in the 4x400 metres relay. Baruah ran in the first leg and gave his team the lead, and the others maintained the lead and won the race. This was Baruah's first national gold medal. After returning to Secunderabad, he trained in the off-season under a new coach, Surya Narayan, whom Baruah later described as his "first true" athletics coach. He credited Narayan with helping him to improve his scientific understanding of running. In the 1963–64 national games held in Calcutta, Baruah, after making a slow start, failed to qualify for the finals. After this, he participated in the 400 metre and 800 metre race at the Open Athletics held in Sri Lanka in 1964, winning gold in both and setting a new Sri Lankan national record in the 800 metres.

Narayan soon after left and went to train athletes abroad, and he was succeeded by Ilyas Babar, who became Baruah's new coach.

In 1964, Baruah participated in the National Athletic Competition held in Chandigarh where he represented Rajasthan and in 1965, he participated in the National Athletic Competition held in Bangalore. He won a gold medal in the 400 metres for both of the events.

=== International success ===
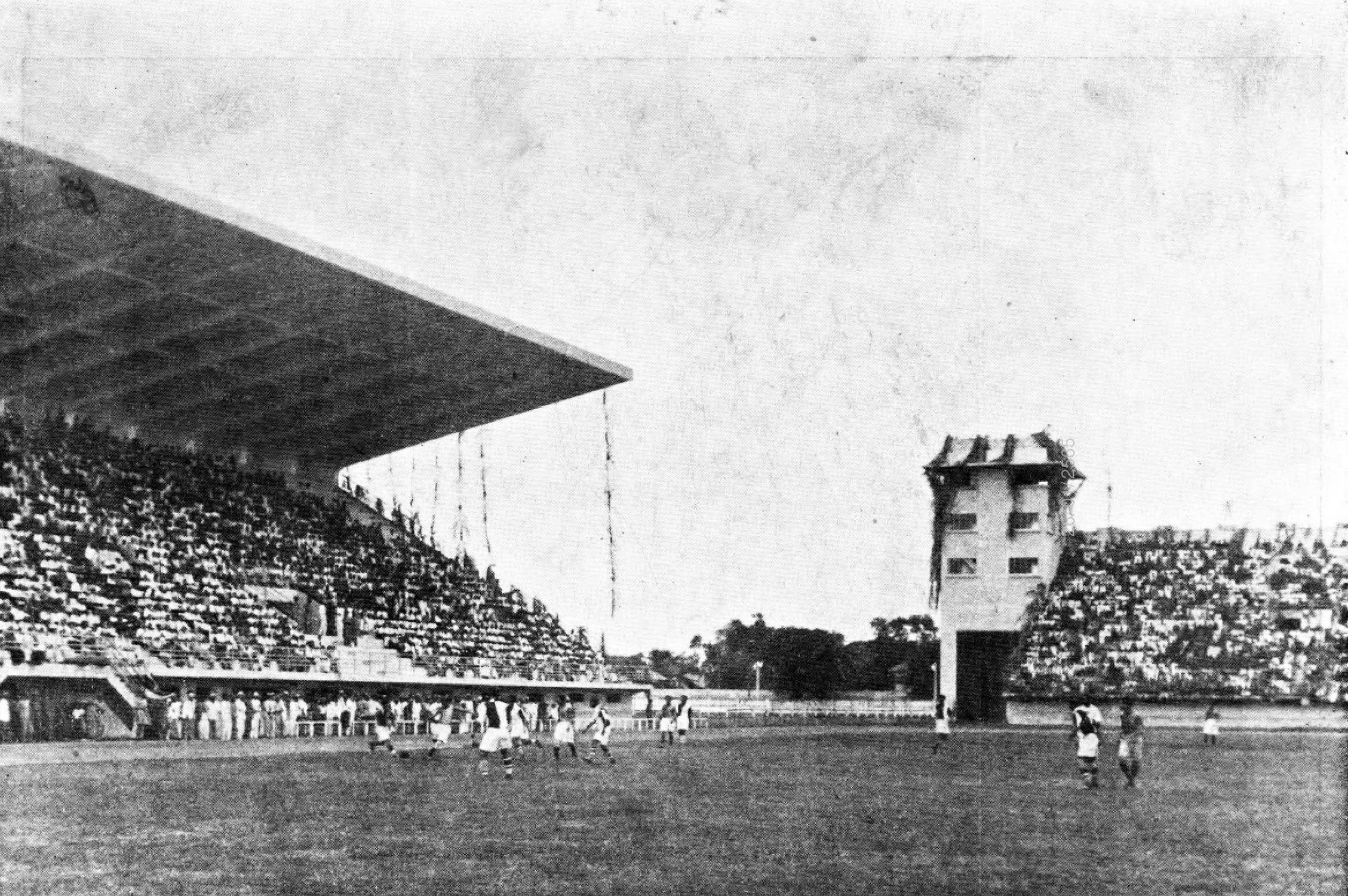
Baruah competed in the 1966 Asian Games, which were held at the National Stadium in Thailand (pictured).

In the two years before 1966 Asian Games, Baruah had been the national champion in the 800 metres, and by timing was one of the top three in Asia. At the 1966 games held in Bangkok, Baruah finished the 800 metres in a time of 1:49.4. He surpassed the record previously held by Japan's Yoshitaka Muroya of 1:52.1. Baruah became the first Assamese athlete to win a gold medal at an international level. He also competed in the 4x400 metres relay but India finished fourth. After his success at the Asian games, Baruah flew back to Delhi where he met Prime Minister Indira Gandhi before returning to Secunderabad.

After his 800 metres at Bangkok, Baruah aspired to win a medal at the 1968 Mexico Olympics. He furthered his training and at the All India Open in Sangrur he won gold in the 400 metres, though did not participate in the 800 metres. In the off-season, he went to Patiala where there was no official camp and his diet subsequently worsened. The olympic qualifying standard was 1:48.5, but at the Delhi trials Baruah failed to qualify. A German expert later examined his blood and assessed that he had insufficient nutrition. Despite this, domestically he continued to compete in the 400 metres and 800 metres in nationals and opens.

Baruah was part of the Indian team that won silver at the 1970 Asian Games in the 400 metre relay, with a time of 3:11.9. He also competed in the 800 metres where he finished fourth. After 1970, his international career largely ended, but Baruah continued competing nationally.

== Later life and career ==
=== Committees and councils ===
After returning from Bangkok, the government of India appointed Baruah a member of the All India Council of Sports (AICS) for a period of three years. After his first term, he was reappointed to the role.

In 1967, he was appointed to the Arjuna award selection committee, a position he would hold for nearly five decades until 2016. He resigned in 2016 after a dispute over the selection of winners that year, and despite being asked by the chairman to stay on, Baruah decided to take leave from the committee. Three Assamese athletes were given the award during his tenure, Monalisa Baruah, Jayanta Talukdar and Shiva Thapa. Baruah stated that he did not have a hand in any of the selections.

Baruah served on the selection committee for the Indian national athletics team, where he made decisions on those for the Olympics and the Asian Games. In the Olympics selection, only those who qualified were able to be selected, but in the Asian Games there was more flexibility; in 1982 when Baruah personally recommended Tayabun Nisha from Assam.

=== ONGC career ===
After his retirement from the Indian Army, Baruah returned to Joysagar where he took up full-time farming, still having aspirations to open up a sports academy in Assam. At the time, the Oil and Natural Gas Corporation (ONGC) in Sibsagar was forming sports teams and their athletes began seeking the guidance of Baruah. After he trained them informally, the athletes urged ONGC to employ him as a permanent coach. The ONGC initially offered Baruah the job of a security guard which he declined. They then offered him the position of driver, but stated that he would not actually need to drive and could continue coaching; only the designation would be "driver". Baruah then accepted the position.

While returning on a trip from Dimapur, Baruah was involved in a road accident with a motorcyclist. A local newspaper then identified Baruah as the ONGC driver. This came to the attention of Balendra Mohan Chakravarty, who was the editor of the Abhiruchi magazine. Chakravarty publicly criticised the ONGC for employing Baruah as a driver. The magazine petitioned the president of India and Member of Parliament (MP) Dinesh Chandra Goswami over the issue. Following the controversy, ONGC shifted the post of sports officer from Dehradun to Sibsagar and appointed Baruah to the position in 1983. The government later sanctioned a petrol pump in his name at Numaligarh.

As sports officer, Baruah was responsible for athletics and all regional sports where he built an 18-20 member athletics squad of mainly Assamese runners, jumpers and throwers. He formed a 15-member hockey squad which won the inter-regional meet the following year. He also took athletes to the 1982 Asian Games trials though none were selected. He retired voluntarily from the ONGC in 1998, after eighteen years of service.

== Sports initiatives and advocacy ==
=== Abhiruchi sports day ===
Chakravarty told Baruah that a large section of the public of Assam were unfamiliar with him, and said that the Abhiruchi magazine wished to confer a social recognition of Baruah by celebrating his birthday as "Abhiruchi sports day". Baruah's birthdate was uncertain, and he went to ask his parents both of whom did not know. However, he subsequently consulted his uncle who remembered that he was born two days before Janmashtami in the Assamese month of Bhado, which was on 3 September in the English calendar which subsequently became the date for the day.

The first Abhiruchi sports day was held on 3 September 1984 in Guwahati which was organised by Chakravarty. The celebration took place from the Chandmari Police station to the Nehru stadium, and the former Asian games gold medalist and president of the All India Football Federation, Nurul Amin, was the chief guest. There were around three–four thousand spectators, and a mass run was held led by Amin, as well as the public felicitation of Baruah and 37 other Assamese athletes. The second sports day took place under some political tension due to the Assam accord, but expansion of the celebrations continued, and by 2018 nearly one hundred organisations held events across the state.

Sportspersons at the early Abhiruchi sports days included Milkha Singh in 1986, and Talimeren Ao and M.P. Ganesh in 1987. Since then, many athletes including Prakash Padukone, Kapil Dev, Ajit Wadekar, Shiny Wilson, Vandana Rao, Dutee Chand, Kunjarani Devi, Khajan Singh, Manohar Aich, and Praveen Kumar have all attended the event.

=== Other activities ===
Baruah established a sports academy in Dimow in Sibasagar in the early 1990s. Through the academy, Baruah trained young athletes; after three years, the academy was shut down due the lack of funding.

On 17 June 2005, the Assam Olympic Association (AOA) offered Baruah the role of chef de mission of the Assam contingent for the 33rd National Games, which he accepted the following month on 17 July. In January 2007, the AOA confirmed that Baruah would remain in the role at the games, which were held from 9 February to 18 February. He was accommodated on the dais during the opening ceremony, and also lit the olympic flame. At the games, Assam finished third behind services and Manipur, and won 148 medals. Baruah also was one of the athletes who carried a torch in a relay in the opening of the 2016 South Asian Games.

In 2014, Baruah was appointed the president of the Assam branch of Clean Sports India. In 2016, he called for the state government to adopt a comprehensive sport policy, which Chief Minister Sarbananda Sonowal subsequently pledged to implement.

In February 2017, the Government of Assam confirmed that ₹5 crore (US$520,000) had been allocated to create a state sports school named after Baruah at the Sarusajai Sports Complex in Guwahati. In 2019, Chief Minister Sonowal laid the foundation stone of the state sports school. Baruah was present during the occasion and said that he was happy to see a sports institute after his name, going on to assert that he hoped it would train many athletes capable of representing the country nationally.

Baruah also served as the brand ambassador of Khel Sivasagar Khel of a sports initiative planned under the Soulful Sivasagar campaign adopted by Sivasagar DC M.S Lakshmipriya in 2020.

== Personal life ==
=== Marriage and family ===
At the age of 34, Bhogeswar Baruah married Renu Baruah, who is a former teacher and homemaker. They have three children together, a daughter and two sons, and two grandchildren. His youngest son, Debojit Baruah, predeceased him.

Baruah's younger brother, Purnananda Baruah, a retired police officer, is his only living sibling.

=== Health issues ===
In his childhood, Baruah nearly died in a tar explosion while he was helping to prepare for the visit of Prime Minister Jawaharlal Nehru to inaugurate Sibsagar college. A tar drum exploded while he was heating it and the burning tar splashed across his limbs, and he then jumped into the Joysagar tank to escape the fire, before he was taken to Sibsagar hospital suffering from severe burns. He was later treated by a local healer who helped him recover.

After leaving the army, Baruah began experiencing sciatica and was treated in Sibsagar civil hospital and the ONGC hospital. He later underwent spinal surgery at the Apollo hospital in New Delhi. In 2016, Barua began suffering from issues with his kidney. Baruah was admitted to the Hayat hospital in Guwahati in November 2018, after suffering kidney disease. In January 2023, he was admitted to the Oil and Natural Gas Corporation hospital in Sibsagar due to knee pain which left him unable to walk.

In 2025, The Hindu reported that Baruah was suffering from amnesia.

== Legacy and recognition ==
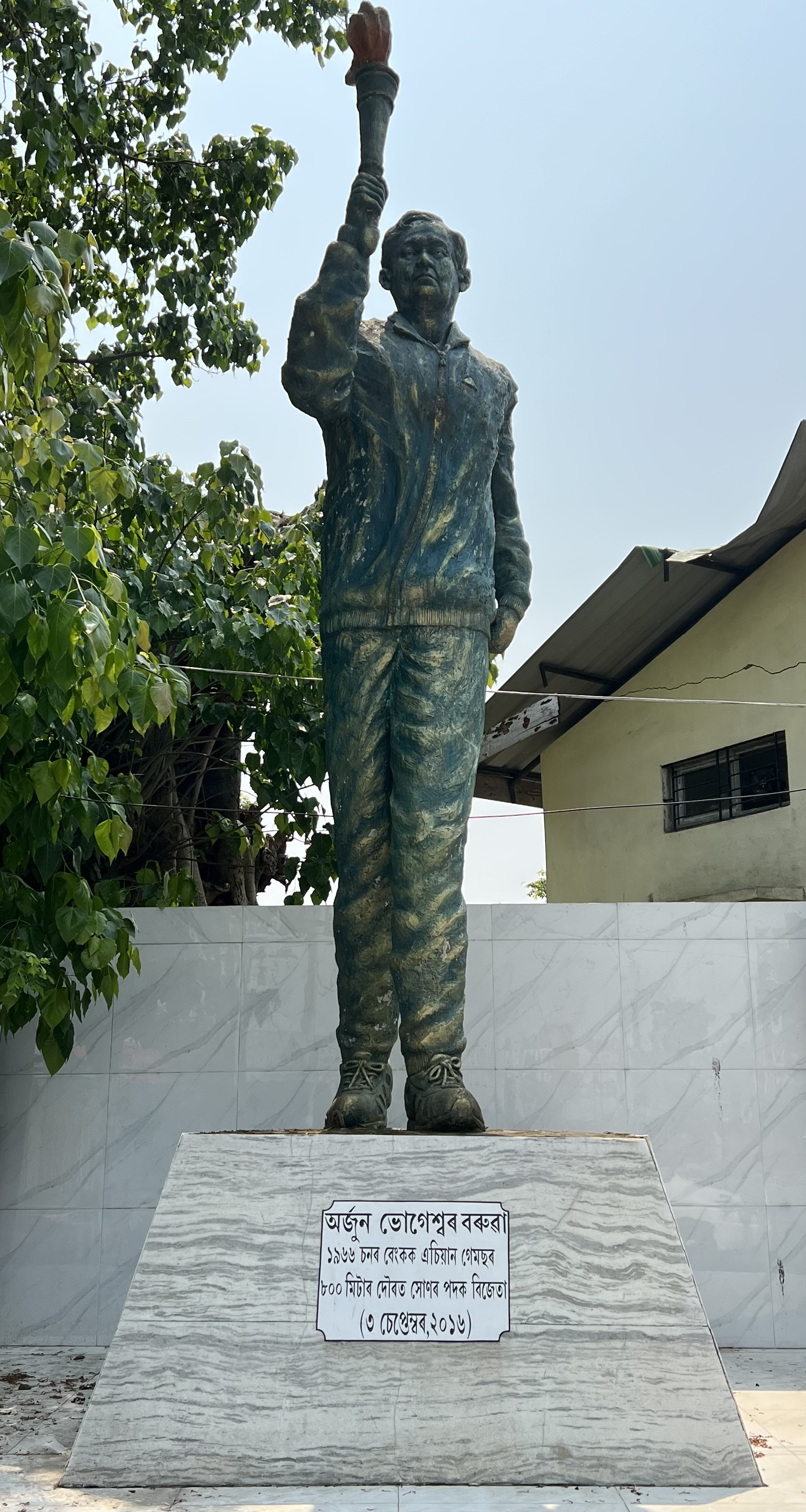
Statue of Baruah in Sibasagar

Balendra Mohan Chakravarty stated that Baruah was a "pioneer" of Assamese sport, citing his status as the first Assamese athlete to win an international gold medal. A statue of Baruah was unveiled on 3 September 2016, which is located at the banks of the Sibsagar Borpukhuri. The Indian Express reported that when he won a gold medal in 1966, "people all over India wondered who he was", but that he subsequently became a "household name" and an "icon" in Assam.

In 2021, the Assam government under Chief Minister Himanta Biswa Sarma announced that Baruah's birthday would be celebrated as sports day in Assam. On 3 September 2021, at the Sports Pension Awards Ceremony, Baruah was one of the 13 recipients to whom Sarma formally presented pension sanction letters to. Governor Jagadish Mukhi and ministers Bimal Bora and Parimal Suklabadiya were also present at the ceremony.

In July 2025, Union Minister and president of the Assam Olympic Association Sarbananda Sonowal announced that a national sports award would be created in honour of Baruah. In August, in an event attended by Sports minister Nandita Garlosa, the trophy was unveiled in a ceremony. On the Abhiruchi sports day in 2025, Himanta Biswa Sarma formally renamed the Sarusajai sports complex as the Arjuna Bhogeswar Baruah sports complex. The inaugural Bhogeswar Baruah national sports awards were held the same day at the Srimanta Sankardeva International Auditorium.

== Honours ==
=== Awards ===
Over Baruah's career, he has received awards including the following:

- Arjuna Award (1966); he became the first person from Assam and Northeast India to receive the award.
- Lachit Award (2015)
- Assam Krida Ratna title (2016), awarded at the All Assam Masters Athletics Championship held in Sibsagar.
- Bir Chilarai Award (2019), presented by Chief Minister Sarbananda Sonowal

=== Eponyms ===
Eponyms of Baruah include:

- Arjun Bhogeswar Baruah State Sports Academy
- Arjuna Bhogeswar Baruah sports complex
- Bhogeswar Baruah national sports awards

== Books featuring Baruah ==
- সোণালী দৌৰ, (2019), a biography written by Narayan Bardoloi

== See also ==
- List of Arjuna Award recipients (1961–1969)
- List of National Sports Award recipients in athletics
