= Kerakuchi =

Coordinates: 26.11°N 91.78°E

Kheraikuchi is the locality in Guwahati, Assam, India; surrounded by the localities of Ghoramara, Sawkuchi and Bhetapara Often pronounced wrongly as Kerakuchi, which diverts from the Bodo Language meaning of the word Kheraikuchi.

== See also ==
- Bhangagarh
- Jyotikuchi
