= Global Investors Summit =

Global Investors Summit may refer to any of the following investment summits in India:

- Assam Global Investors' Summit
- Madhya Pradesh Global Investors' Summit
- Invest Kerala Global Summit
- Tamil Nadu Global Investors Meet
- Vibrant Gujarat Global Summit
