= Gyan Educational Institution =

Gyan Educational Institution.
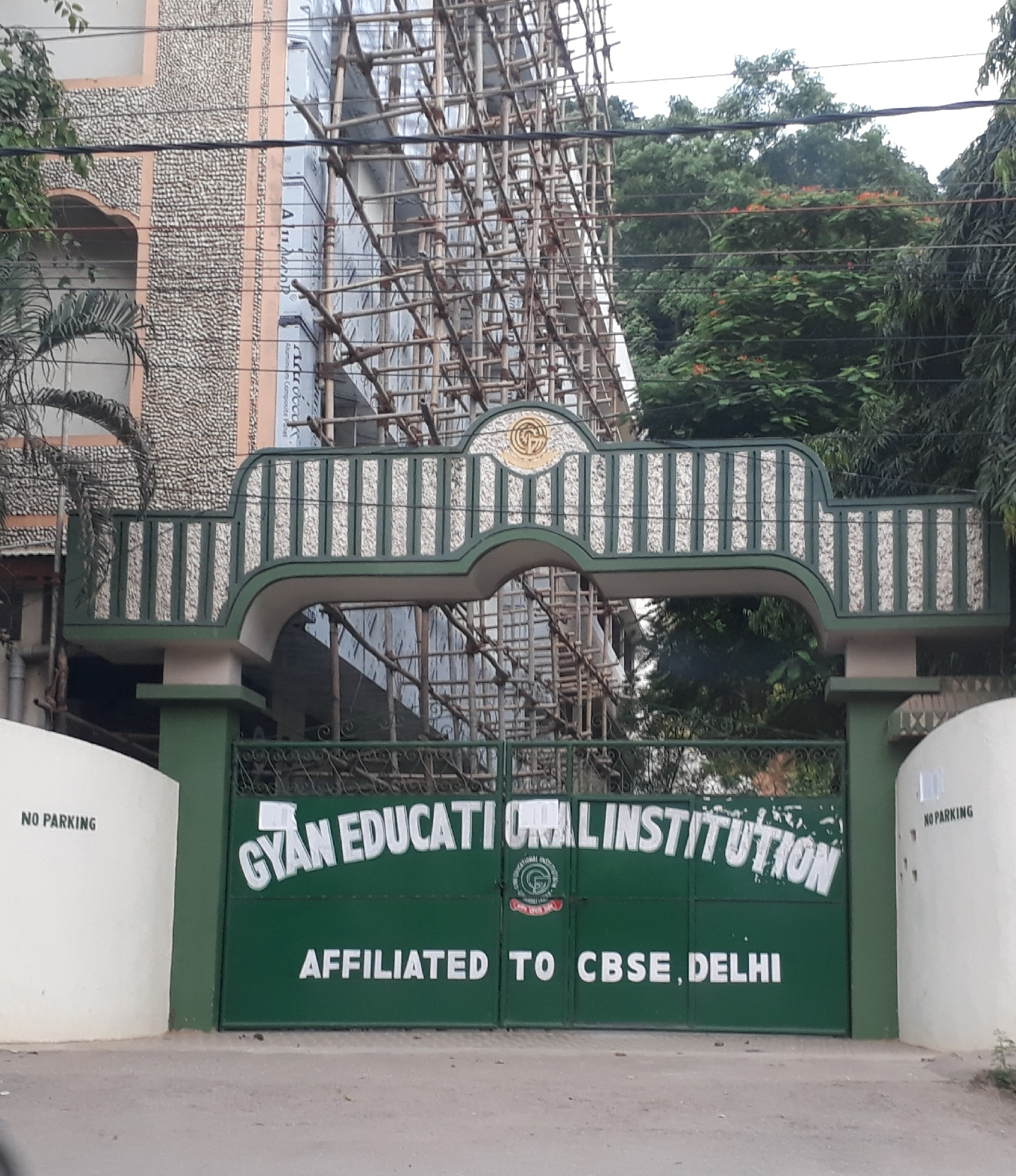
- Guwahati, Assam; India

Information
- Type: Private School
- Motto: 'ज्ञानेन प्राप्यते सर्वम।।'
- Established: 17 April 2002; 16 years ago
- School code: 30032
- President: Jayashree Ghosh.
- Director: Shymal Ghosh.
- Principal: Sumita Adhikary.
- Grades: Nursery – Class 12.
- Area: Jyotikuchi, Lokhra Road, Guwahati – 781034.
- Houses: Netaji; Lachit; Radhakrishnan; Gandhi
- Colors: Yellow; Green
- Slogan: Do all the good you can, by all the means you can, in all the ways you can, in all the places you can, at all the times you can, to all the people you can, as long as you can.
- Affiliations: Central Board of Secondary Education
- Website: www.geighy.co.in

Gyan Educational Institution is a higher secondary school, affiliated to the Central Board of Secondary Education, New Delhi. The school is located in Guwahati, Assam, India. It was established on 17 April 2002 and is one of the institutions of Gyan Educational society. The school is surrounded by a hill in its east, and the Lokhra Road in its west. The school is also covered under Project Child.

== Magazines ==
The school has its own yearly magazine, 'Arohan'. It was first published in 2016. With three language sections, namely English, Hindi and Assamese. It comprised many poems, short inspirational stories, paintings, jokes, articles on science and technology, Photos and pictures, etc., written, painted and edited by students, teachers, and administrative staffs.

== List of principals ==
- Rajib Dhar : 2002–2012
- Soma Bhattacharjee : 2012–2015
- Sumita Adhikary: 2015–present

== Campus ==
The school is in Jyotikuchi in the Guwahati city. The school campus has a hillock on the eastern side, and the Lokhra Road on the western side.

The school is easily accessible from the Guwahati city by roads. The school is 7.2 km from Guwahati Railway Station; 27 km from the Lokpriya Gopinath Bordoloi International Airport; 10 km from Kamakhya Railway Station. The capital complex of Assam at Dispur is 7.9 km from the School.

== Facilities ==
The school has bus facilities with GPS in almost every main routes within the city, first-aid facilities with a nurse during the working hours, message facilities for informing about various notices to the parents and guardians, smart class facilities for students from nursery to class 12.

The school also comprises a mini Saraswati temple, an open hall, a Library, a Computer laboratory, a Physics laboratory, a Geography laboratory, a Biology laboratory, a Chemistry laboratory, an activity room, a councillors' room, a sports room, a MIL room, a hygienic canteen for its students as well as for staff and a playground. Facilities for safe drinking water is also provided by the school.

The school also awards annual scholarship of ₹ 10,000 to the candidate securing 1st position with aggregate 80% plus marks from class VI to class X.

== See also ==
- List of educational institutions in Guwahati
- Lalganesh
