= Iswarati Center for Badminton Learning =

Badminton academy

Official logo

Iswarati Center for Badminton Learning (ICBL) is a school of badminton, opened by three-times Indian National Badminton Champion and two-times Olympian, Dipankar Bhattacharjee in Guwahati, Assam, India. The training center has been set up specially to train the youths of Assam and North-Eastern India. ICBL is a private non-profit association created by Bhattacharjee in 2004.

It started as an association in 2004 at Guwahati with the support of a few interested people morally backing Bhattacharjee in his efforts.

Bhattacharjee has unsuccessfully approached many sponsors, such as the prominent businesses in the region. However, he is continuously pursuing support from sponsors to make this effort successful.

Bhattacharjee has described the Academy for Badminton Learning as a significant development for the sport in Assam, North-East India, and the country more broadly. Authorities such as the International Badminton Federation (IBF) have undertaken efforts to increase badminton's popularity and attract sponsors and audiences. In line with these initiatives, Bhattacharjee has been engaging with potential sponsors across Assam, North-East India, and neighbouring states, with the aim of expanding the sport's commercial profile. He has expressed optimism that companies currently investing in sports such as cricket and tennis in India may direct greater attention toward badminton in the future

Bhattacharjee was one of the first members at BPL Prakash Padukone Academy in Bangalore trained with Prakash Padukone. His association with Padukone gave him the hope to venture out to popularise badminton and train talented youths of the oft-neglected region of Assam and North-East India.

== Organizational structure ==
President:

- Shri, P. K. Deb, Adviser Transport & Communication, North-Eastern Council, Shillong

Vice Presidents:

- Shri Iswar Bhattacharjee (Retd. PWD Executive Engineer)
- Shri Dilip Biswas
- Shri Pradip Hazarika

General Secretary:

- Shri Dipankar Bhattacharjee

Treasurer:

- Shri Biswajit Ghosh

Jt. Secretaries:

- Shri Arup Buragohain
- Shri Arup Das
- Shri Parasmoni Deka
