= Sawkuchi =

Locality in Guwahati, Assam, India

- Locality
- Interactive map of Sawkuchi
- Coordinates: 26.12344°N 91.74876°E
- Country: India
- State: Assam
- Region: Western Assam
- District: Kamrup Metropolitan

Government
  - Body: Guwahati Municipal Corporation
- Time zone: UTC+5:30 (IST)
- PIN: 781040
- Area code: 0361
- Vehicle registration: AS-01
- Website: https://gmc.assam.gov.in/

Sawkuchi (also spelled Saukuchi) is a locality in Guwahati, Assam, India, located in the southwestern part of the city within the Kamrup Metropolitan district. It forms part of the urban area administered by the Guwahati Municipal Corporation.

== Geography ==
Sawkuchi is located in the southwestern part of Guwahati and lies near National Highway 27. The locality is part of the city’s continuous urban development zone.

It is surrounded by residential neighbourhoods including Lokhra, Nalapara, Bhetapara, Beharbari, Betkuchi, Jyotikuchi, and Sonaighuli, and is connected to other parts of the city such as Hatigaon, Ghoramara, Lalmati, Beltola, Lalganesh, Odalbakra, and Kahilipara and others.

== Transport ==
Sawkuchi is connected to other parts of Guwahati through the local road network. Its proximity to National Highway 27 provides regional connectivity across Assam and the northeastern region.

The locality is linked by internal roads to nearby areas including Lokhra, Nalapara, Beharbari, and Bhetapara. Major transport hubs such as the Guwahati Railway Station in Paltan Bazaar and the Lokpriya Gopinath Bordoloi International Airport are also accessible from the area.

== Sports infrastructure ==
Sawkuchi is located near the Arjuna Bhogeswar Baruah Sports Complex (formerly Sarusajai Sports Complex), which includes the Indira Gandhi Athletic Stadium.

The stadium was one of the venues for the 2017 FIFA U-17 World Cup held in India.

The complex has also been used for various national and international sporting and cultural events in Assam.

== Education ==
Educational institutions in and around Sawkuchi include NEF College and its affiliated institutions, offering higher education in fields such as management, pharmacy, and technology.

== Notability context ==
Sawkuchi is located in the southwestern urban corridor of Guwahati near National Highway 27 and the Sarusajai sports complex and institutional area.

It is situated in proximity to the Arjuna Bhogeswar Baruah Sports Complex, which includes the Indira Gandhi Athletic Stadium and has hosted international sporting events such as the 2017 FIFA U-17 World Cup.

The locality also includes residential areas and educational institutions such as NEF College and its affiliated institutions.
