= Tarlok Singh (athlete) =

Indian long-distance runner

Tarlok Singh (1929 or 1930 - date of death unknown) was an Indian long-distance runner who won a gold medal in the 10000 meters and a bronze medal in the 5000 meters runs at the 1962 Jakarta Asian Games. Subsequently, he was affected by tuberculosis because of malnutrition and succumbed to it without nearly receiving any medical treatment.

Singh was born in 1929 or 1930. He was in the Indian Army, where he achieved Havildar rank. He was a part of the Jammu and Kashmir Rifles infantry regiment and was promoted to naib subedar rank in 1966.

Singh was coached by Indian athletics coach Ilyas Babar. He was said to have started a medal rush and kicked off a "golden era" of men’s middle and long-distance running in India during the 1960s and 1970s.

On 21 January 1962, Singh set a 10,000 metres personal best time of 30:01.6 to win an athletics meeting in Delhi. At the 1962 Asian Games, Singh won a 10,000 m gold medal in a championship record time of 30:21.58 and won the 5000 m bronze medal in 14:31.4 minutes. Singh, who ran with a beard, beat Japan's Teruo Funai by only two tenths of a second in the 10,000 m.

Singh became the first 1962 recipient of the Arjuna Award, the second-highest sporting honour in India.
