= Ilyas Babar =

Indian athletics coach

- Born: Mohammed Ilyas Babar; 1926; Kalaburagi
- Died: 30 July 2002 (aged 75–76); Hyderabad, India
- Awards: Dronacharya Award (1994)

Mohammed Ilyas Babar (1926 – 30 July 2002) was an Indian athletic coach. Babar was born in Gulbarga in Karnataka. He became an outstanding university athlete in Hyderabad and was the state champion in 110m hurdles between 1950 and 1957, and in long jump. He graduated in commerce from the Osmania University.

He obtained a diploma in coaching from the National Institute of Sports in Patiala in 1961. He coached for a while in Secunderabad before moving to Delhi. There he joined the Rajputana Rifles and served until 1999.

His trainees included Jagmal Singh, B. V. Satyanarayan, BS Barua, Sriram Singh, Tarlok Singh, Charles Borromeo, Bagicha Singh, Harlal Singh, Ram Narayan Singh and Geeta Zutshi. Between them, they won 17 gold medals in Asian Games and Asian Track and Field meets, three Padma Shri and five Arjuna awards. Sriram Singh finished seventh in the 800m in the Montreal Olympics and set an Indian record that stood for 42 years. Babar went to the Montreal Olympics on his own expense, having to sell his scooter and various household goods and borrow from his friends to reach Montreal.

Babar was given the Dronacharya Award in 1994. In the 1978 Asian Games in Bangkok he was voted as the Best coach in Asia by a panel of international experts and presented with the Adidas Golden Shoe. He died at age 76, three days after undergoing a surgery for stomach ulcer in Hyderabad, India.
