= Jyotikuchi =

- Neighbourhood
- Nickname: Jyotikuchi
- Location within Guwahati Location within Assam
- Coordinates: 26°7′N 91°43′E
- Country: India
- State: Assam
- District: Kamrup Metropolitan district
- City: Guwahati
- Time zone: IST (UTC + 5:30)
- Postal code: 781034
- Area code: 781034
- ISO 3166 code: IN-AS

Jyotikuchi is a locality in Guwahati. It is surrounded by the localities of Lokhra, Sawkuchi and Barsapara.

== See also ==
- Gyan Educational Institution
- Lalganesh
- Chandmari
- Bhetapara
- Guwahati
