= Dipankar Bhattacharjee =

Indian badminton player

Dipankar Bhattacharjee OLY
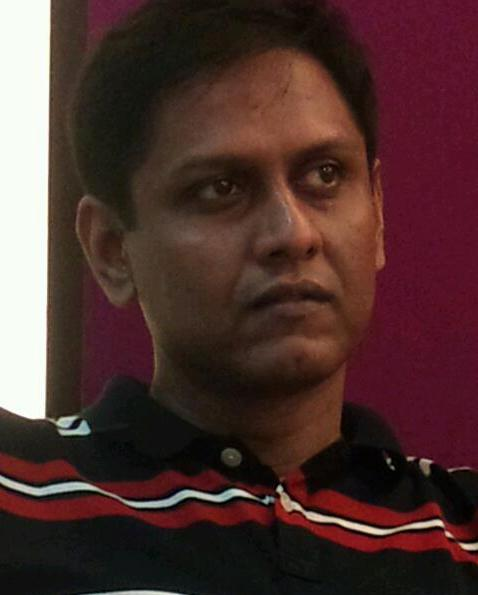
- Dipankar Bhattacharjee

Personal information
- National team: India
- Born: 1 February 1972 (age 54) Guwahati, India
- Spouse: Dahlia Bhattacharjee (2001–present)

Sport
- Sport: Badminton

Dipankar Bhattacharjee (born 1 February 1972) is a Badminton player from Assam, India. He represented India at many International tournaments including the Barcelona and Atlanta Olympics. He was the Indian National Badminton Champion thrice and a runner-up twice. At the Barcelona Olympics, he reached the pre-quarters.

== Early life ==
Dipankar started playing badminton at a very early age. He was five years old when his father Mr. Iswar Bhattacharjee took him out for Badminton training. His father is his first coach and has been a constant guide and adviser who started local tournaments in the Guwahati Indoor Hall (Kanaklata Indoor Stadium) to attract interests from younger kids and their parents for Badminton.

In addition to his own father, Dipankar was trained by several other good coaches. He had spent few years at Prakash Padukone's Badminton academy at Bangalore and trained with Prakash, Vimal Kumar, Mr. Veedu, etc. He was guided by National and State level Badminton coaches.

== Career ==
Dipankar had been the star attraction in many tournaments for his style of game. He played fast-paced, endurance and offense (smash) based game.

== Retirement ==
He retired early from the game in 2004 due to injuries, after playing the last Indian National Championships at Guwahati.

== Post-playing career ==
He launched his Badminton Coaching center at Guwahati by the name of "Iswarati Center for Badminton Learning" or ICBL. The project was carried on for almost 3 years in a badminton coaching facility in Guwahati.He is also a mentor of Indian Collegiate Athletic Program for the sport of Badminton.

== Achievements ==
- Sub-junior National runner-up - Guwahati in 1980
- Junior National Champion - Madras (Chennai) in 1987
- Senior National Champion - Three times
- Senior National runner-up - Two times
- Represented India in Barcelona (1992) and Atlanta Olympics (1996). He lost in the pre-quarters to Zhao Jianhua, of China, 15–4, 15–12.
- Had been nominated for Arjuna Award couple of times
- Bhogeswar Baruah Lifetime Achievement Award - in 2025.

== Hall of Fame ==
Dipankar's achievements have gone into the record books in the following areas -

- He is the first Olympian from the current state of Assam.
- He is one of the first Badminton players to represent India in Olympics.
- He is the only Senior National Badminton Champion from the North-East India till date (2014).
- He is the only Male Shuttler from India to have made it to Two Olympics (1992 & 1996).

== Personal life ==
Dipankar is currently employed with Indian Oil Corporation, Western regional office in Mumbai. He married Ms. Dahlia Banerjee of Kolkata in 2001 and has a son with her.

He is an MBA graduate from India's leading B- school, S.P.Jain Institute of Management and Research, Mumbai.

Dipankar underwent successful brain surgery for Pituitary adenoma, a type of brain tumor on Feb 4, 2020 at the Hinduja Hospital in Mumbai, performed by noted neurosurgeon B. K. Misra.
