= Bhogeswar Baruah National Sports Awards =

Indian sports award

- 3 September 2025; 3 September 2027
- Awarded for: Sports achievements
- Sponsored by: Assam Olympic Association
- Date: 3 September
- Presented by: Chief Minister of Assam president of Assam Olympic Association
- Eligibility: Indian sportsperson
- Rewards: ₹5 lakh (US$5,300): Sportsperson of the Year ₹3 lakh (US$3,200): Lifetime Achievement in Sports ₹2 lakh (US$2,100): Emerging Sports Talent of the Year
- Status: Active
- First award: 2025

Highlights
- Total awards: 6 (and special recognition)

The Bhogeswar Baruah National Sports Awards are a set of national Indian honours awarded once every two years by the Assam Olympic Association on 3 September. The awards were introduced in 2025, in honour of the first Assamese athlete to become an international gold medalist, Bhogeswar Baruah.

There are three categories of the award: Sportsperson of the Year, Lifetime Achievement in Sports and Emerging Sports Talent of the Year, and each category is awarded for both National and Assam recipients.

== History ==
In July 2025, Union Minister and president of Assam Olympic Association Sarbananda Sonowal announced the establishment of the Bhogeswar Baruah National Sports Awards, to recognise and commend the achievements of athletes in the country. Sonowal said that the awards would aim to "promote excellence, dedication and integrity in the field of sports". The award was named after Assamese sports legend Bhogeswar Baruah, the first Assamese athlete to win an international gold medal.

On 28 August 2025, the Bhogeswar Baruah National Sports Award trophy unveiled in a ceremony in Guwahati. The event was attended by Sports Minister Nandita Garlosa and boxer Ankushita Boro.

At the inaugural awards ceremony on 3 September, Union Minister Sonowal and Chief Minister Himanta Biswa Sarma presented the awards, and the ceremony was attended by various athletes and figures including president of the Indian Olympic Association, P.T. Usha. Sonowal said that the awards would be a "beacon of inspiration for every young Assamese and every Indian athlete - to dream bigger, play harder, and make our nation proud." Sarma said that the launch of the award was a defining moment for the sporting fraternity of Assam.

During the inaugural ceremony, a regular pensions scheme for sportspersons in Assam was also announced, and recognition of grassroots success of schools was also given.

The awards are given once every two years.

== Categories and rewards ==
The award has three categories: Sportsperson of the Year, Lifetime Achievement in Sports and Emerging Sports Talent of the Year, and each category is awarded for both National and Assam athletes. Special recognition awards are also given as part of the awards.

The Sportsperson of the Year recipient is awarded ₹5 lakh (US$5,300), the Lifetime Achievement in Sports recipient is awarded ₹3 lakh (US$3,200), and the Emerging Sports Talent of the Year is awarded ₹2 lakh (US$2,100).

== 2025 winners ==
=== National ===
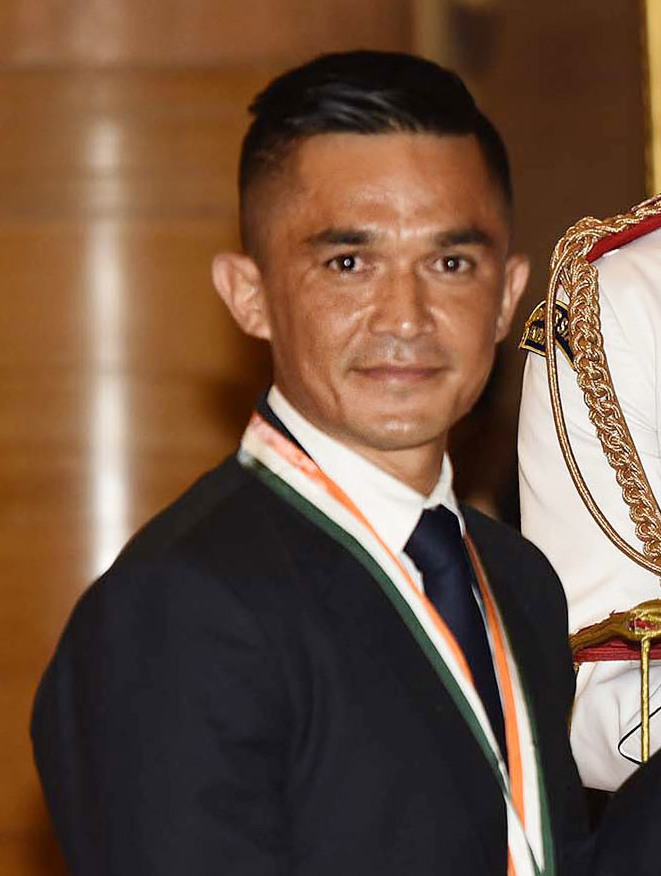
Sunil Chhetri won the inaugural Lifetime Achievement in Sports national award.

Category	Athlete	Field	Reward
Sportsperson of the Year	Manu Bhaker	Shooting	₹5 lakh (US$5,300)
Lifetime Achievement in Sports	Sunil Chhetri	Football	₹3 lakh (US$3,200)
Emerging Sports Talent of the Year	Bedabrat Bharali	Weightlifting	₹2 lakh (US$2,100)

=== Assam ===
Category	Athlete	Field	Reward
Sportsperson of the Year	Lovlina Borgohain	Boxing	₹5 lakh (US$5,300)
Lifetime Achievement in Sports	Dipankar Bhattacharjee	Badminton	₹3 lakh (US$3,200)
Emerging Sports Talent of the Year	Priyanuj Bhattacharya	Table tennis	₹2 lakh (US$2,100)

=== Special recognition ===
Special recognition awards also went to Babul Phukan, Balendra Mohan Chakravarty, Prema Dhar Sarma, Jowel Bey, Joydip Das, Pradip Brahma, Rakesh Bonik, Rimpi Buragohain, Swadhin Deka Raja, and Syed Eske Alam.
