= Project Child =

- Website: www.projectchild.co.in

Project Child or Project “CHILD”, an initiative of Society for Promotion of School Health (SPSH), is the oldest and most comprehensive School Health Programme of Assam. It incorporates the emergency, preventive, promotive and curative aspect of School Health Care, as well as, addressing all the needs of a school student.

‘CHILD’ is an acronym for "Child Health Intellectual and Lifestyle Development". The project is an initiative of a group of more than 40 doctors under the banner of Society for Promotion of School Health and Lifestyle Consultancy (SPSH) and has been active since 2008. To date, this project has covered the life of roughly 3, 10,000 students in Assam; of these, around 10,000 students are from Guwahati city.

== Schools Covered ==
The following are schools covered under this initiative:

1. Faculty Higher Secondary School
2. Don Bosco High School, Guwahati
3. Maria's Public School
4. Assam Don Bosco University
5. Pragjyotish Sr. Secondary School
6. Pragjyotish School
7. Faculty School
8. Faculty School
9. Shirdi Sai Vidya Mandir
10. Maria Montessori School
11. Modern English School
12. Delhi Public School
13. South Point School
14. St. Francis De Sales School
15. Gurukul Grammar Senior Secondary School
16. Holy Child School
17. Gyan Educational Institution
18. Sanskriti Gurukul
