= 2007 National Games of India =

National games of India

33rd National Games of India
- Host city: Guwahati
- Teams: 33
- Athletes: 10,945
- Events: 32
- Opening: 9 February 2007
- Closing: 18 February 2007
- Opened by: Sonia Gandhi (President of the Indian National Congress)
- Closed by: Manmohan Singh (Prime Minister of India)
- Torch lighter: Bhogeswar Baruah
- Main venue: Indira Gandhi Athletic Stadium, Sarusajai, Guwahati

The 2007 National Games, also known as the 33rd National Games of India and informally as Assam 2007, was the 33rd edition of the National Games of India, held from 9 February 2007 to 18 February 2007 in Guwahati, Assam, India.

Indian National Congress president Sonia Gandhi declared the 33rd National Games open amid clamorous cheering from the 30,000 strong crowd at the Indira Gandhi Athletic Stadium. Bihar, Puducherry and Tripura did not participate in the games.

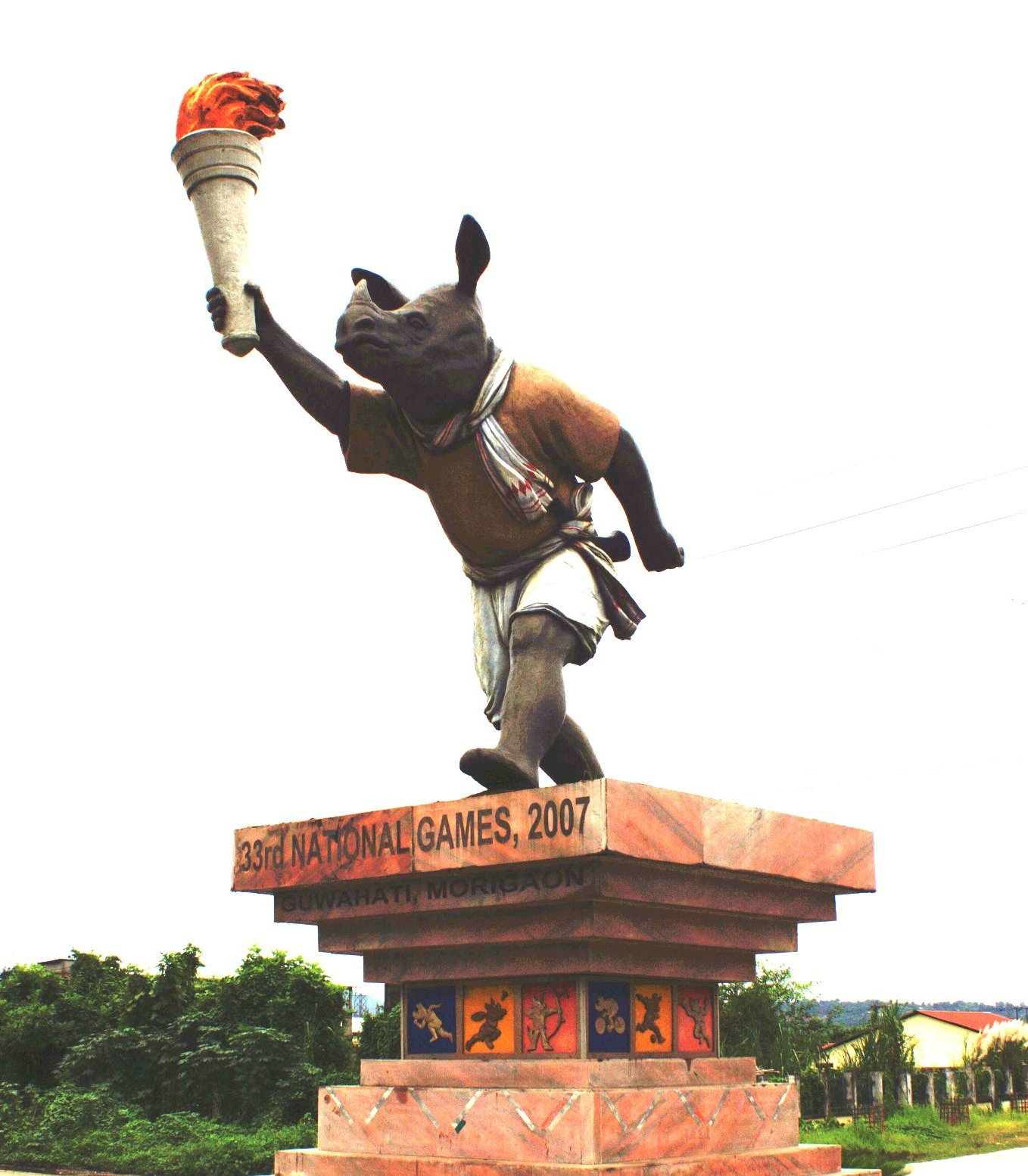
Statue of games mascot Rongmon the indian rhino in front of Sarusajai Stadium

== Medal table ==
* Host nation ( Assam)

Rank	State	Gold	Silver	Bronze	Total
1	Services	59	46	37	142
2	Manipur	51	32	40	123
3	Assam*	38	53	57	148
4	Kerala	31	19	25	75
5	Haryana	30	22	28	80
6	Delhi	27	27	32	86
7	Punjab	25	39	40	104
8	Maharashtra	25	28	44	97
9	Uttar Pradesh	25	18	34	77
10	Karnataka	21	21	29	71
11	Andhra Pradesh	21	17	20	58
12	Madhya Pradesh	12	19	32	63
13	West Bengal	12	13	18	43
14	Tamil Nadu	10	21	20	51
15	Jharkhand	6	9	7	22
16	Chandigarh	5	3	8	16
17	Odisha	5	2	8	15
18	Uttarakhand	4	4	5	13
19	Gujarat	3	4	12	19
20	Jammu and Kashmir	3	3	10	16
21	Chhattisgarh	3	3	0	6
22	Himachal Pradesh	3	2	2	7
23	Sikkim	2	2	2	6
24	Rajasthan	1	4	10	15
25	Goa	1	2	2	5
26	Nagaland	1	1	9	11
27	Mizoram	1	0	7	8
28	Andaman and Nicobar Islands	0	6	4	10
29	Meghalaya	0	1	4	5
30	Arunachal Pradesh	0	0	3	3
Totals (30 entries)		425	421	549	1,395

== Closing ceremony ==
Capacity crowd witnessed the closing ceremony. Prime Minister of India Manmohan Singh, Governor of Assam Ajai Singh, Chief Minister of Assam Tarun Gogoi and Indian Olympic Association president Suresh Kalmadi were also present at the ceremony.

Preceded by 2002 National Games of India	National Games of India	Succeeded by 2011 National Games of India
