= Indira Gandhi Athletic Stadium =

Stadium in Assam, India

- Sarusajai Stadium
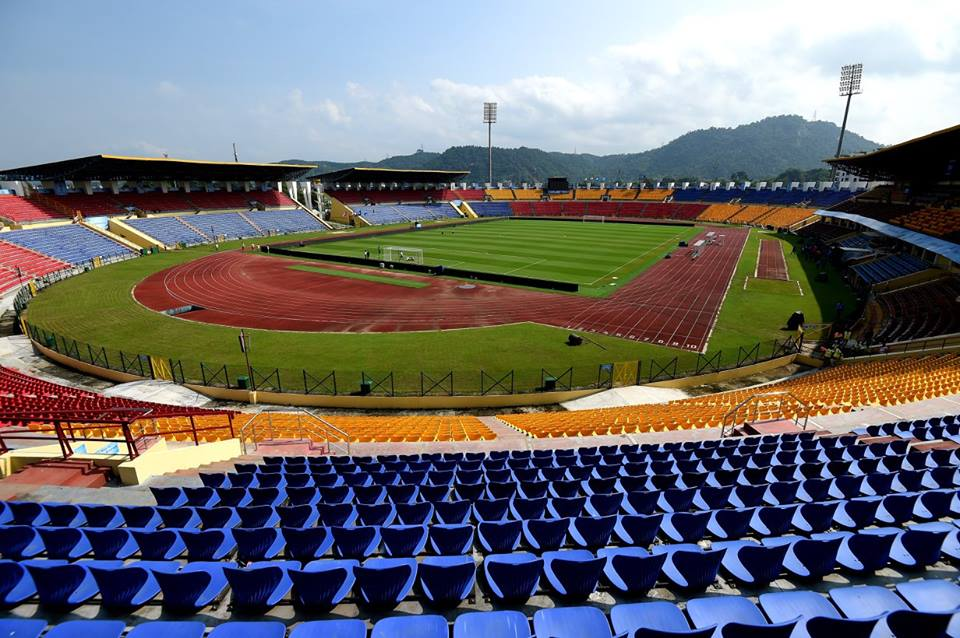
- Interior of the stadium in 2017
- Interactive map of Indira Gandhi Athletic Stadium
- Location: Sarusajai, Guwahati, Assam
- Coordinates: 26°06′56″N 91°45′37″E
- Owner: Government of Assam
- Operator: Sports Authority of Assam
- Capacity: 21,600
- Surface: Grass
- Record attendance: 32,844 (20 October 2016, Chennaiyin FC vs Northeast United FC)
- Field size: 103 m × 70 m (113 yd × 77 yd)

Construction
- Opened: 2007

Tenants
- India national football team (2011–present); NorthEast United FC (2014–present)

The Indira Gandhi Athletic Stadium, also known as Sarusajai Stadium, is a multi-purpose stadium part of the Arjuna Bhogeswar Baruah Sports Complex, in Lokhra locality, Guwahati, Assam, India. Seating 21,600 people, it is the home ground of NorthEast United FC and also of Inter Kashi FC for the season 2025-26 and is used for athletic events. The stadium was one of the venues for the 2007 National Games, the 2016 South Asian Games, and the 2017 FIFA U-17 World Cup.

== History ==
This one-tier stadium was constructed in 2007 to host the 33rd National Games of India with a mostly standing capacity for 35,000 people. Only the main stand had a limited number of seats installed.

The stadium was named to tribute the late Indira Gandhi who was the third Prime Minister of India. An international friendly between India and Malaysia was played at this stadium on 13 November 2011. On 12 March 2015, India played against Nepal for the 2018 World Cup qualifier.

From 2014, it has been the home ground for NorthEast United FC in the Guwahati-based Indian Super League side, and for which it underwent major renovations. The stadium recorded the highest attendance for a football game in Assam when 32,844 spectators came to see the ISL match between NorthEast United and visitors Chennaiyin on 20 October 2016.

It was also used by I-League champions Aizawl FC (2016–17) of Mizoram and Minerva Punjab FC (2017–18) of Punjab as their home ground for AFC group stage matches. It is also proposed by Inter Kashi for season 2025-26 as their home stadium till the time their own stadium get ready in Varanasi.

The stadium was the main venue of the 2016 South Asian Games, which was held in both Guwahati and Shillong from 5 to 16 February 2016.

It was one of the venues for the 2017 FIFA U-17 World Cup held in India. Individual seats were installed in 2017, during the preparation for the event, reducing capacity to below 25,000.

The stadium hosted the Assam Global Investors' Summit on 3 and 4 February 2018 and the 65th Filmfare Awards on 15 February 2020.

The stadium was selected as one of the provisional venues for the FIFA U-17 Women's World Cup that was to be held in India in 2020 where it was expected host the opening. The tournament later got postponed due to COVID-19 and the stadium was dropped from the list of venues.

In March 2020, the Government of Assam constructed isolation wards during the COVID-19 pandemic in India in the premises.

On 28 May 2025, a meeting of the cabinet of Assam chaired by Chief Minister Himanta Biswa Sarma renamed the sports complex of which the stadium is a part of as the Arjuna Bhogeswar Baruah Sports Complex, after the first Assamese sportsperson to receive the Arjuna Award, Bhogeswar Baruah. The stadium is part of the wider Arjuna Bhogeswar Baruah sports complex:

== Major football matches ==
As well as local matches, the stadium has also hosted major national and international matches.

=== India national football team matches ===
13 November 2011 International friendly	India	1 - 1	Malaysia	Guwahati
	Nabi 88'	Report	Safiq 42'	Stadium: Indira Gandhi Athletic Stadium; Attendance: 20,092

12 March 2015 World Cup Qualifier	India	2 - 0	Nepal	Guwahati
19:00 UTC+5:30	Chhetri 53', 71'	Report (FIFA); Report (AFC)		Stadium: Indira Gandhi Athletic Stadium; Attendance: 11,209; Referee: Aziz Asimov (Uzbekistan)

7 June 2016 Asian Cup qual. – PO	India	6–1	Laos	Guwahati
19:00 UTC+5:30	Lalpekhlua 43', 74'; Passi 45+1'; Jhingan 48'; Rafique 83'; Cardozo 87'	Report; Goal.com	Sihavong 16'	Attendance: 2,721; Referee: Jansen Foo (Singapore)

5 September 2019 2022 AFC WC Q	India	1–2	Oman	Guwahati
19:30 IST	Chhetri 24'	FIFA	Al-Alawi 82', 90'	Stadium: Indira Gandhi Athletic Stadium; Attendance: 22,798; Referee: Mooud Bonyadifar (Iran)

26 March 2024 2026 WCQ / 2027 ACQ	India	1–2	Afghanistan	Guwahati
19:00 UTC+5:30	Chhetri 38' (pen.)	FIFA	Akbari 70'; Mukhammad 88' (pen.)	Stadium: Indira Gandhi Athletic Stadium; Attendance: 8,932; Referee: Mohammed Al-Hoish (Saudi Arabia)

=== 2017 FIFA U-17 World Cup matches ===
8 October 2017 U-17 World Cup – Group Stage	New Caledonia	1–7	France	Indira Gandhi Athletic Stadium, Guwahati
17:00 UTC+5:30	Wadenges 90'	Report	Iwa 5' (o.g.); Gouiri 19', 33'; Gomes 30'; Caqueret 40'; Wanesse 43' (o.g.); Isidor 90+1'	Attendance: 12,640; Referee: Hamada Nampiandraza (Madagascar)

8 October 2017 U-17 World Cup – Group Stage	Honduras	1–6	Japan	Indira Gandhi Athletic Stadium, Guwahati
20:00 UTC+5:30	Palacios 36'	Report	Nakamura 22', 30', 43'; Kubo 45'; Miyashiro 51'; Suzuki 90'	Attendance: 13,285; Referee: Anthony Taylor (England)

11 October 2017 U-17 World Cup – Group Stage	France	2–1	Japan	Indira Gandhi Athletic Stadium, Guwahati
17:00 UTC+5:30	Gouiri 13', 71'	Report	Miyashiro 73' (pen.)	Attendance: 9,575; Referee: Gery Vargas (Bolivia)

11 October 2017 U-17 World Cup – Group Stage	Honduras	5–0	New Caledonia	Indira Gandhi Athletic Stadium, Guwahati
20:00 UTC+5:30	Mejía 25', 42'; Canales 27'; Palacios 51', 88'	Report		Attendance: 11,002; Referee: Mehdi Abid Charef (Algeria)

14 October 2017 U-17 World Cup – Group Stage	France	5–1	Honduras	Indira Gandhi Athletic Stadium, Guwahati
17:00 UTC+5:30	Isidor 14'; Flips 23', 64'; Gouiri 86'; Adli 90+6'	Report	Mejía 10'	Attendance: 12,831; Referee: Muhammad Taqi (Singapore)

14 October 2017 U-17 World Cup – Group Stage	Mexico	0–0	Chile	Indira Gandhi Athletic Stadium, Guwahati
20:00 UTC+5:30		Report		Attendance: 15,794; Referee: Slavko Vinčić (Slovenia)

== Major events ==
=== Bihu Dance Performance ===
On a 14 April 2023, on the occasion of Bohag Bihu, over 11,000 dancers and musicians gathered at the stadium to perform the traditional Assamese Bihu dance, setting two world records. This performance achieved the world record for the largest Bihu dance performance and the largest performance by folk musicians. The event lasted for 15 minutes and showcased the talents of more than 7,000 dancers and over 3,000 dhol drummers and other musicians.

The event was attended by Chief Minister Himanta Biswa Sarma and Prime Minister Narendra Modi. Himanta Biswa Sarma also received a Geographical Indication registration certificate for the Gamosa, the traditional Assamese scarf, which was given in December 2022.
