= Lalganesh =

- Neighbourhood
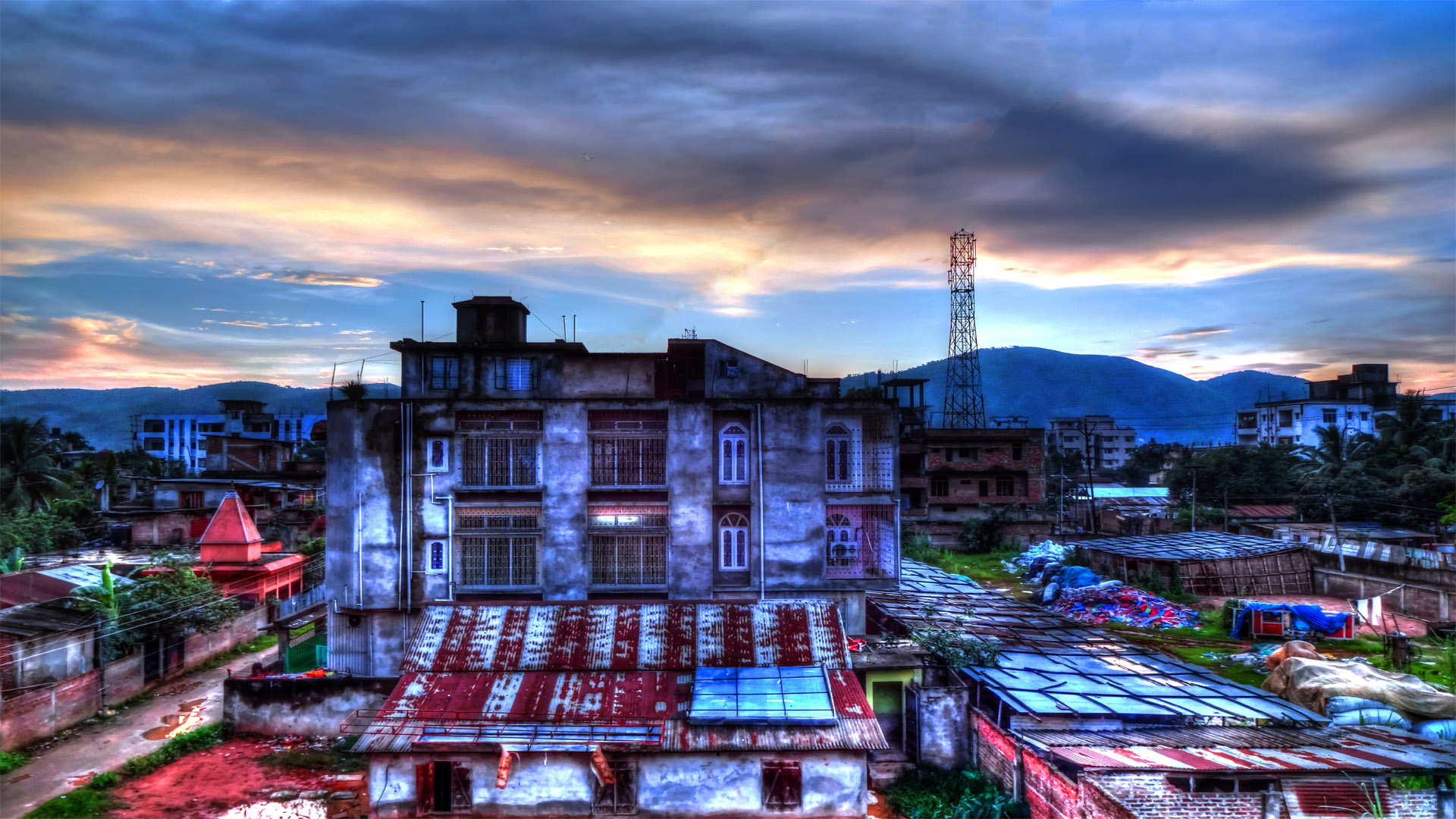
- Picture of buildings in Lalganesh. The Nilachal Hill can be seen in the backdrop.

- Lalganesh, Guwahati, India Lalganesh (Assam)
- Coordinates: 26.142621°N 91.741841°E
- Country: India
- State: Assam
- District: Kamrup Metropolitan district
- City: Guwahati
  - Density: 390/sq mi (150/km^{2})
- Time zone: IST (UTC + 5:30)
- Postal code: 781034
- Area code: 781034
- ISO 3166 code: IN-AS

Lalganesh is a neighbourhood of Guwahati, Assam, India. It is a little far from the heart of the city. This place is famous for an old temple. Many people believe that if anyone wishes anything in this temple their wishes get fulfilled. Lalganesh is home to a wide range of markets and commercial centres. The real beauty of this place can be seen at night when the whole place is filled with lights.

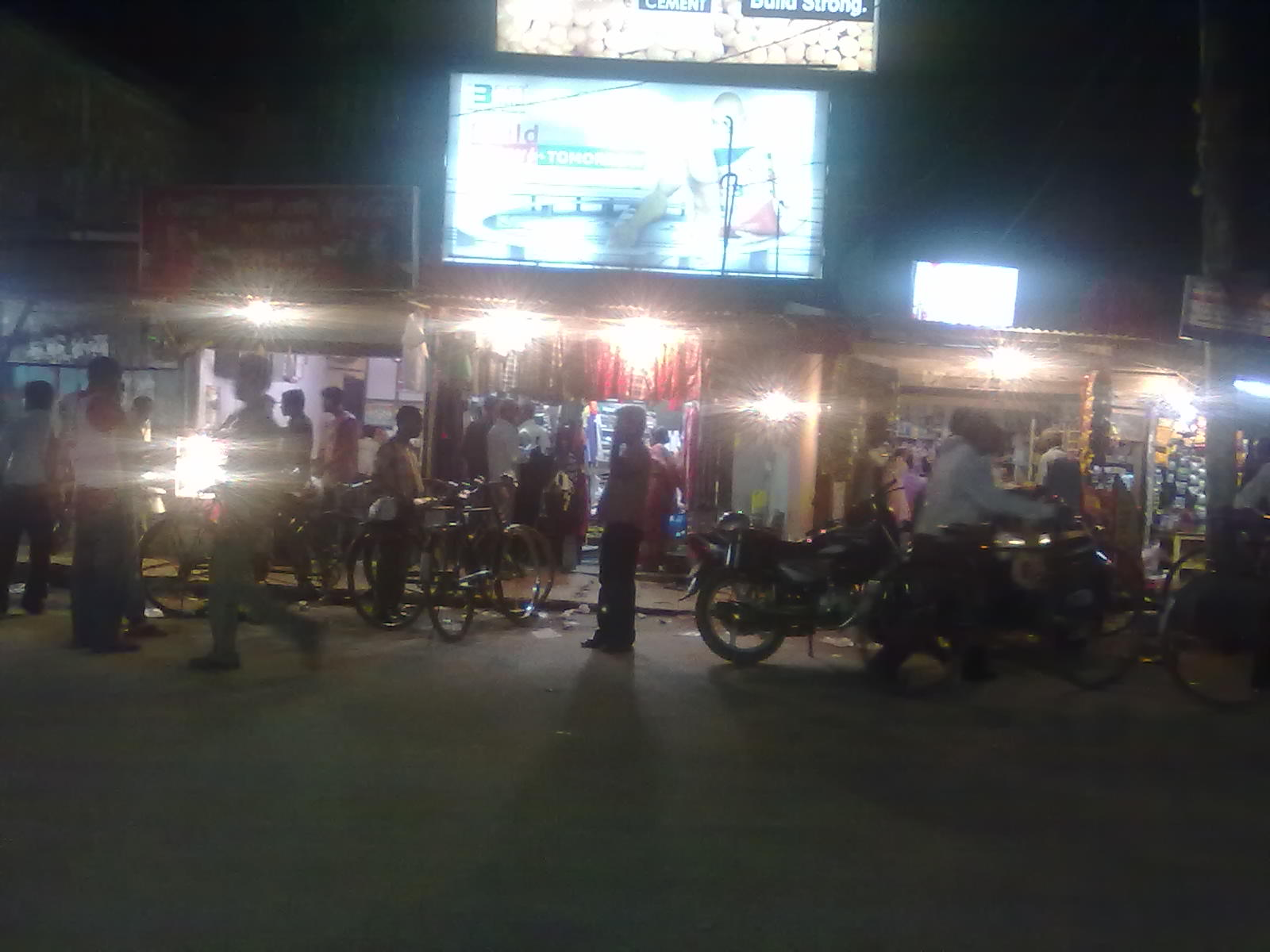
Lalganesh at night

== Healthcare ==
One of the leading super speciality hospital of North-East, Hayat Hospital is located at Lalganesh.

== Demography ==
Lal Ganesha area including Kalapahar locality as word numbers- 52 and 17 have a population of 9 thousands and 21.3 thousands people as per as 2011 census. The Lalganesh area included Kalapahar as well and the demography here mainly consists of Bengali Hindus who form overwhelming majority of the population of the area. Durga puja and Kali puja are the most celebrated festivals of this area and many more festivals are celebrated like Bengali new year with great favour with enthusiasm.

== Flood ==
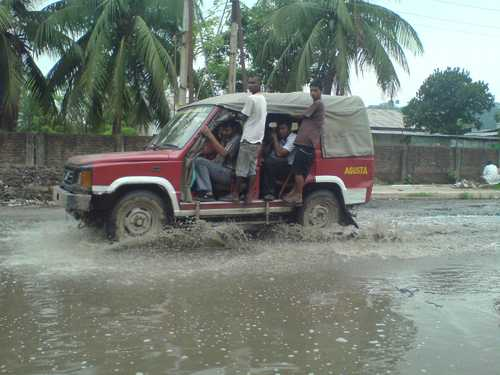
Water logging at Lalganesh

Lalganesh is a flood prone area. During heavy rainfall Lalganesh gets flooded. Many measures have been made by the Government of Assam to improve the condition of this place due to flood, like leveling of roads, making wide and deep drains, roads having kerbs with vertical inlets etc.

== See also ==
- Kahilipara
- Jyotikuchi
