= Kamlesh Mehta =

Indian table tennis player

- Born: 1 May 1960 (age 66); Mumbai
- Occupation: Table tennis player

Kamlesh Navichandra Mehta (born 1 May 1960) is an Indian retired table tennis player. In March 2017, the Ministry of Youth Affairs and Sports, Government of India, appointed him as the national observer for table tennis.

== Personal life ==
Nicknamed Kamu, Kamlesh Mehta was born in Mumbai on 1 May 1960. After primary school at St. Joseph's Wadala branch, he went to R. A. Podar College in Mumbai to graduate in Commerce and then joined Dena Bank. He is married to the table tennis player from Assam, Monalisa Baruah (Monalisa Baruah Mehta).

== Table tennis career ==
Kamlesh was the captain of the Indian team from 1982 to 1989 and was the highest ranked Indian player in Asia, the Commonwealth and the world. He played in the final of the national championships on eleven occasions between 1981 and 1994, winning the title eight times. He was runner-up on three occasions.

Kamlesh represented India in seven world championships, eight Asian championships, two Asian Games, four South Asian Federation games, two Olympic Games and many other official and friendly competitions in India and abroad. His best performance came in the SAF Games in 1991 at Colombo where he won seven gold and four silver medals.

He won the World Bank Championship at the Isle of Man (UK) in 1989. He won all four gold medals at the Pentangular International Championships in 1983.

== Awards ==
During a nearly twenty-year career, Kamlesh Mehta has received numerous recognitions. The Maharashtra Government's Shiv Chhatrapati Award was the first, received in 1979 followed in 1984 by The Friendship Trophy for being the best player from India at the Asian Championship in Islamabad. He was twice named the Best Sportsman by the Sports Journalists' Association of Bombay. He was awarded the Arjuna Award, in 1985. He was the first Indian to receive the Fair Play Trophy at the Commonwealth Championships, in 1989.

== Coaching ==
Mehta has coached the Indian table tennis team on multiple occasions. His was first appointed in 1998 to coach the national team at the Osaka Asian Games. Later, he assisted the chief coach Massimo Constantini at the 2010 Guangzhou Asian Games.
