= Monalisa Baruah Mehta =

Indian table tennis player

Personal information
- Nationality: (India) Indian
- Born: Monalisa Baruah Assam
- Spouse: Kamlesh Mehta

Sport
- Country: India
- Sport: Table Tennis

Achievements and titles
- Highest world ranking: Arjuna award (1987)

Monalisa Mehta (née Baruah) is an Indian table tennis player from Assam. She received an Arjuna Award in 1987.

She is married to Kamlesh Mehta, eight-time national table tennis champion.

She has an apartment in Shine Heaven, Panjabari, Guwahati. She is employed in Oil India Limited.
