= Tayabun Nisha =

Indian former athlete

Personal information
- Nationality: Indian
- Citizenship: Indian

Sport
- Sport: Athlete, Discus throw
- Position: National record holder in 1974
- Event(s): Asian Games, 1982
- Former partner: Vice-president of Assam Athletics Association

Tayabun Nisha is an Indian former athlete. She has been known for her performance when she broke a national record in Discus throw in 1974 and also represented the country in several international events. She was born at Dhaiali in Sivasagar district in Assam, India.

She lost her parents when she was a class VIII student. Also, belonging to a conservative family she faced many hurdles during her early days to take part in sports. But these hurdles couldn't prevent her from achieving goals. In 1971 she took part in the 9th Inter State Athletic Meet and made her debut in Ahmedabad. She won a bronze medal in the tournament and created history in sports becoming the first woman athlete from her state Assam, to win a medal in a national championship.

In 1974 in Jaipur she broke a 12 year old national record in Discus throw. She made a throw with distance of 29.32 metre in the tournament. She also took part in 1982 Asian Games in New Delhi, but missed the medal. Currently, she is planning to set up a sports academy and hostel for girls from poor families. She was also the vice-president and General Secretary of Assam Athletics Association.
