= Indian Army Corps of EME =

Service branch of the Indian Army

Corps of EME
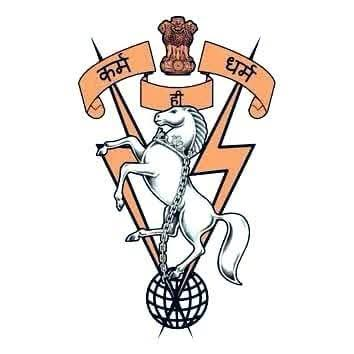
- Crest of the Corps of EME
- Active: 1943–present
- Country: India
- Branch: Indian Army
- Headquarter: Secunderabad, Telangana, India
- Motto: Karm Hi Dharm (Work is Worship)
- Colours: Oxford Blue, Golden Yellow and Scarlet
- March: Lillibullero
- Mascot: Eagle
- Anniversaries: 15 October

Insignia
- Flag

The Corps of Electronics and Mechanical Engineers (EME) is an arms and service branch of the Indian Army. The Corps has varying responsibilities related to the design, development, trial, inspection and refit of weapon systems and equipment. They also provide technical advice to units and conduct recovery operations in peace and war.

== History ==
The British Army formed the Corps of Royal Electrical and Mechanical Engineers (REME) on 1 October 1942, in order to put the responsibilities of repairing and maintaining all British Army equipment under one unit. Previously, this was done by different corps like the Royal Army Ordnance Corps, the Corps of Royal Engineers and the Royal Army Service Corps. Soon, the need for an equivalent of the REME was felt in British Indian Army too. Accordingly, the Commander-in-Chief of British forces approved the raising of the Indian Electrical and Mechanical Engineers (IEME). On 1 May 1943, the Mechanical Engineering Directorate at General Headquarters was formed and units were allocated. On 15 October 1943, actual transfer of personnel from the Indian Army Ordnance Corps (IAOC) to IEME took place. Since then, 15 October is observed as EME Corps day. On 15 September 1944, Lt. Gen. Sir Clarence Bird was appointed as the Colonel Commandant of IEME.

After Indian independence, the corps dropped the 'I' from its name and came to be known as the Corps of Electrical and Mechanical Engineers (EME). In 1957, Major General Harkirat Singh, KCIO, was appointed as the first Indian Director of the Corps of Electrical and Mechanical Engineers (DEME). With the proliferation of high technology, the modernisation of the Indian Army in the 1980s and 1990s resulted in use of electronics in all types of equipment which necessitated the corps to change its outlook from electrical to electronics. Thus, the corps was re-christened as the "Corps of Electronics and Mechanical Engineers" on 1 January 2001.

The Corps of EME also has a cadre of Gp 'A' Gazetted Civilian Technical Officers who are recruited through coveted Indian Engineering Services Examination (IES) conducted by Union Public Services Commission (UPSC). The civilian officers are mostly posted to Army Base Workshops, EME Directorate and training establishments such as MCEME, Secunderabad and EME School, Vadodara.

== Crest ==
The crest of IEME was designed by Major General DR Duguid, the first DME and remained in vogue from 1943 to 1955. It was in bronzed brass with fine-pointed 'Star of India' surmounted by a crown and encircled by a thick wreath of laurels. I.E.M.E. were embossed on the base of the wreath. The Corps motto 'Omnia Facimus' meaning 'We can do everything' was inscribed.

The present badge was designed by Major SE Doig and was taken into use from 26 January 1955. In 1967 the size of the crest was reduced to two-thirds of the original size. The badge is bi-metallic with the horse, chain and globe in white metal and the rest in gilt. The horse chained to the globe symbolises harnessed mechanical power with the lightning flashes depicting electrical energy. The globe is indicative of the impact of engineering on the world. On the top of Crest is the National Emblem of India and the Corp's motto inscribed Karm Hi Dharm in Devanagri Script.

== Motto ==
Omnia Facimus (in Latin), which translates to 'We can do everything', was the Corps motto used during the formative years of Corps. After the IEME was transformed into the EME, a new Corps motto was selected which should be in line with the Indian ethos. To reflect the work culture amongst the craftsmen, the motto 'Karm Hi Dharm' was selected. Translated into English the motto is, 'Work is the only duty'.

== Flag ==
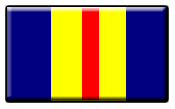
Corps of EME flag

Oxford Blue : Signifies devotion to duty.

Golden Yellow : Represents magnanimity and intellect.

Scarlet : Implies aggressiveness valour and sacrifice.

== Regimental colours ==
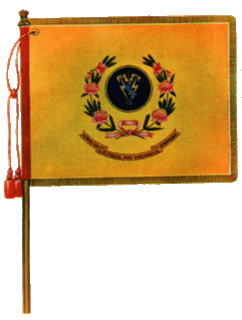
Regimental colours of Corps of EME

The Colours stand for everything that the Corps is. They speak of honour, of deeds, of dedication and of the service rendered by the personnel of the Corps. They are the symbol of the spirit of the Corps and are sacred to the soldier.

The design for the Corps colours was proposed by the then DEME, Major General SP Vohra, and approved by the then President Dr S Radhakrishnan, in March 1964.

The EME colours is a golden yellow silken flag, 3 feet by 3 feet 9 inches; the Corps badge is embroidered on a blue circular piece and placed in the centre with a single wreath of Ashoka leaves and lotus flowers embroidered around it. On a scroll beneath the wreath is embroidered the name 'Corps of Electrical and Mechanical Engineers'. The name of Ashoka signifies peace and the leaves represent happiness and prosperity. The lotus is a symbol of peace, tranquility, beauty and richness.

The Corps of EME has been recognized with Colours on the following occasions:

1) The President of India, Dr S Radhakrishnan, presented the Colours to the Corps on 15 October 1964 at 1 EME Centre Secunderabad during the 21st Anniversary celebrations. The Colour party consisted of Lieutenant RP Nanda, Havildar Major Dev Raj and Naik bashisht. It was the first amongst the Services to receive Regimental Colours, an honour bestowed to acknowledge the contribution made by this young Corps.

2) The Second Colours Presentation was presented at 3 EME Centre Bhopal on 15 October 1980. The Colours were presented on behalf of the President by General OP Malhotra, PVSM, COAS.

3) After a gap of 24 years, the Third Colours presentation was presented on 23 November 2004 and for the first time after rechristening the corps as Corps of Electronics and Mechanical Engineers. The old colours were put to rest and new colours were presented to the Corps at 1 EME Centre, Secunderabad by Gen NC Vij, PVSM, UYSM, COAS on behalf of the President during Diamond Jubilee Celebration and Eighth Corps Reunion on 23 November 2004, at 1 EME Centre, Secunderabad.

4) The high order of dedication of the Corps was again recognised when the Corps was once more honoured with colours on 18 February 2005. On behalf of the President of India, Gen JJ Singh, PVSM, AVSM, VSM, ADC, COAS, whose father was an EME officer, presented the Fourth Colours Presentation at 3 EME Centre Bhopal.

== Monuments ==
The Corps has six Monuments.

- The War Memorial, Secunderabad
- EME War Memorial, Bhopal
- EME Archives and Museum, Secunderabad
- Dakshina Murthy Temple, Vadodara
- Guruvayurappan Temple, Secunderabad
- The EME Gurudwara, Vadodara
