= Assam Global Investors' Summit =

Assam Global Investors' Summit 2018
- Date: February 3–4, 2018
- Venue: Sarusajai Stadium, Guwahati
- Location: Guwahati, Assam, India; 26°06′56″N 91°45′37″E
- Organised by: Government of Assam
- Website: advantageassam.com

Assam Global Investors' Summit or Advantage Assam Global Investors' Summit on 3–4 February 2018 was an economic summit organised by the Government of Assam. The main aim of the summit is to increase the trade and other relations with Southeast Asia. Members and Delegates from ASEAN and BBIN countries along with industrialists and business leaders of India and around the world are invited in this summit. The Summit aims at highlighting the geo-strategic advantages offered to investors by Assam. The summit will also focus on India's Act East Policy which will help in achieving balanced and fast-paced growth of the north-eastern region and development of MSME sector.

The summit is organised in Sarusajai Stadium, Guwahati.

It is the first of its type of summit organised in Assam and Northeast India.

The summit will focus investing on different sectors like: Power, Agriculture & Food Processing, IT & ITeS, River Transport & Port Townships, Plastics & Petrochemicals, Pharmaceuticals & Medical Equipment, Handloom, Textiles & Handicrafts, Tourism, Hospitality & Wellness, Civil Aviation and Petroleum and Natural Gas.

== Features ==
On the first day of the summit, notable chief guests visited are Prime Minister of India Narendra Modi, Chief Minister of Assam Himanta Biswa Sarma, Prime Minister of Bhutan Tshering Tobgay, Japanese Ambassador to India Kenji Hiramatsu, CEOs and MDs of companies like Tata Group, Reliance Industries, Sun Pharma, Patanjali, ONGC, OIL, Spicejet, ITC Limited, etc. The government has already announced a plan of ₹47,000 crore (US$4.9 billion) to improve connection with the North-East, with the network of 15 railway lines.

On The first day of mega investor exposition for Assam named as "Advantage Assam" witnessed a sign of 176 MoUs with 160 companies amounting to ₹65,186 crore (US$6.8 billion).

This table represents the amount of money invested in day 1.

Name of the Company	Amount will be invested (Crore ₹)
ONGC	13,000
Oil India Limited	10,000
IOCL	3,432
Numaligarh Refinery Limited (NRL)	3,410
Indo-UK Institute of Health	2,700
Reliance Group of Industries	2,500
Century Plyboards	2,100
Spicejet	1,250
Infinity Group	1,000
McLeod Russel	700
