= List of Asian Games medalists in swimming =

This is the complete list of Asian Games medalists in swimming from 1951 to 2022.

== Men ==
=== 50 m freestyle ===
Games	Gold	Silver	Bronze
1990 Beijing	Shen Jianqiang (CHN)	Ang Peng Siong (SIN)	Feng Qiangbiao (CHN)
1994 Hiroshima	Alexey Khovrin (KAZ)	Jiang Chengji (CHN)	Sergey Borisenko (KAZ)
1998 Bangkok	Jiang Chengji (CHN)	Tomohiro Yamanoi (JPN)	Hirosuke Hamano (JPN)
2002 Busan	Kim Min-suk (KOR)	Shared gold	Issei Nakanishi (JPN)
2002 Busan	Ravil Nachaev (UZB)	Shared gold	Issei Nakanishi (JPN)
2006 Doha	Rafed Al-Masri (SYR)	Makoto Ito (JPN)	Cai Li (CHN)
2010 Guangzhou	Lü Zhiwu (CHN)	Masayuki Kishida (JPN)	Rammaru Harada (JPN)
2014 Incheon	Ning Zetao (CHN)	Shinri Shioura (JPN)	Kenta Ito (JPN)
2018 Jakarta–Palembang	Yu Hexin (CHN)	Katsumi Nakamura (JPN)	Shunichi Nakao (JPN)
2022 Hangzhou	Ji Yu-chan (KOR)	Ian Ho (HKG)	Pan Zhanle (CHN)

=== 100 m freestyle ===
Games	Gold	Silver	Bronze
1951 New Delhi	Sachin Nag (IND)	Wiebe Wolters (SIN)	Sotero Alcantara (PHI)
1954 Manila	Hiroshi Suzuki (JPN)	Teijiro Tanikawa (JPN)	Neo Chwee Kok (SIN)
1958 Tokyo	Manabu Koga (JPN)	Kao Chia-hung (ROC)	Shintaro Yokochi (JPN)
1962 Jakarta	Keigo Shimizu (JPN)	Tadaharu Goto (JPN)	Achmad Dimyati (INA)
1966 Bangkok	Kunihiro Iwasaki (JPN)	Teruhiko Kitani (JPN)	Roosevelt Abdulgafur (PHI)
1970 Bangkok	Shojiro Sawa (JPN)	Kunihiro Iwasaki (JPN)	Tan Thuan Heng (SIN)
1974 Tehran	Dan Brener (ISR)	Lin Senlin (CHN)	Akira Iida (JPN)
1978 Bangkok	Tsuyoshi Yanagidate (JPN)	Guo Ruishan (CHN)	Gerardo Rosario (PHI)
1982 New Delhi	Ang Peng Siong (SIN)	Wan Qiang (CHN)	Lukman Niode (INA)
1986 Seoul	Katsunori Fujiwara (JPN)	Shen Jianqiang (CHN)	Ang Peng Siong (SIN)
1990 Beijing	Shen Jianqiang (CHN)	Xie Jun (CHN)	Richard Sam Bera (INA)
1994 Hiroshima	Yukihiro Matsushita (JPN)	Sergey Borisenko (KAZ)	Alexey Yegorov (KAZ)
1998 Bangkok	Shunsuke Ito (JPN)	Shusuke Ito (JPN)	Zhao Lifeng (CHN)
1998 Bangkok	Shunsuke Ito (JPN)	Shusuke Ito (JPN)	Igor Sitnikov (KAZ)
1998 Bangkok	Shunsuke Ito (JPN)	Shusuke Ito (JPN)	Huang Chih-yung (TPE)
2002 Busan	Chen Zuo (CHN)	Liu Yu (CHN)	Daisuke Hosokawa (JPN)
2006 Doha	Chen Zuo (CHN)	Park Tae-hwan (KOR)	Daisuke Hosokawa (JPN)
2010 Guangzhou	Park Tae-hwan (KOR)	Lü Zhiwu (CHN)	Takuro Fujii (JPN)
2014 Incheon	Ning Zetao (CHN)	Shinri Shioura (JPN)	Rammaru Harada (JPN)
2018 Jakarta–Palembang	Shinri Shioura (JPN)	Katsumi Nakamura (JPN)	Yu Hexin (CHN)
2022 Hangzhou	Pan Zhanle (CHN)	Wang Haoyu (CHN)	Hwang Sun-woo (KOR)

=== 200 m freestyle ===
Games	Gold	Silver	Bronze
1958 Tokyo	Makoto Fukui (JPN)	Tatsuo Fujimoto (JPN)	Habib Nasution (INA)
1962 Jakarta	Toshizo Umemoto (JPN)	Tadaharu Goto (JPN)	Tin Maung Ni (BIR)
1966 Bangkok	Kunihiro Iwasaki (JPN)	Tan Thuan Heng (SIN)	Roosevelt Abdulgafur (PHI)
1970 Bangkok	Kunihiro Iwasaki (JPN)	Noboru Waseda (JPN)	Jairulla Jaitulla (PHI)
1974 Tehran	Yukio Horiuchi (JPN)	Cho Oh-ryun (KOR)	Dan Brener (ISR)
1978 Bangkok	Gerardo Rosario (PHI)	Kristiono Sumono (INA)	Hiroshi Sakamoto (JPN)
1982 New Delhi	William Wilson (PHI)	Wu Jinhuang (CHN)	Huang Guohua (CHN)
1986 Seoul	Katsunori Fujiwara (JPN)	Shigeo Ogata (JPN)	Shen Jianqiang (CHN)
1990 Beijing	Xie Jun (CHN)	Tomohiro Noguchi (JPN)	Wang Dali (CHN)
1994 Hiroshima	Taihei Maeda (JPN)	Kazunori Hikida (JPN)	Woo Won-ki (KOR)
1998 Bangkok	Yosuke Ichikawa (JPN)	Torlarp Sethsothorn (THA)	Shusuke Ito (JPN)
2002 Busan	Liu Yu (CHN)	Yoshihiro Okumura (JPN)	Yosuke Ichikawa (JPN)
2006 Doha	Park Tae-hwan (KOR)	Zhang Lin (CHN)	Daisuke Hosokawa (JPN)
2010 Guangzhou	Park Tae-hwan (KOR)	Sun Yang (CHN)	Takeshi Matsuda (JPN)
2014 Incheon	Kosuke Hagino (JPN)	Sun Yang (CHN)	Li Yunqi (CHN)
2018 Jakarta–Palembang	Sun Yang (CHN)	Katsuhiro Matsumoto (JPN)	Ji Xinjie (CHN)
2022 Hangzhou	Hwang Sun-woo (KOR)	Pan Zhanle (CHN)	Lee Ho-joon (KOR)

=== 400 m freestyle ===
Games	Gold	Silver	Bronze
1951 New Delhi	Neo Chwee Kok (SIN)	Mohammad Mala (PHI)	Bimal Chandra (IND)
1954 Manila	Yoshihiro Shoji (JPN)	Katsuji Yamashita (JPN)	Bana Sailani (PHI)
1958 Tokyo	Tsuyoshi Yamanaka (JPN)	Nagatoshi Maruyama (JPN)	Bana Sailani (PHI)
1962 Jakarta	Tin Maung Ni (BIR)	Toshizo Umemoto (JPN)	Masami Nakabo (JPN)
1966 Bangkok	Etsujiro Takase (JPN)	Tan Thuan Heng (SIN)	Tony Asamli (PHI)
1970 Bangkok	Cho Oh-ryun (KOR)	Akira Iida (JPN)	Toshinori Murata (JPN)
1974 Tehran	Cho Oh-ryun (KOR)	Shuji Ono (JPN)	Kaname Sakamoto (JPN)
1978 Bangkok	Shuji Tsukasaki (JPN)	Kazuhiko Yoshihara (JPN)	Kristiono Sumono (INA)
1982 New Delhi	Ikuhiro Terashita (JPN)	William Wilson (PHI)	Wu Jinhuang (CHN)
1986 Seoul	Xie Jun (CHN)	Shigeo Ogata (JPN)	Wang Dali (CHN)
1990 Beijing	Tomohiro Noguchi (JPN)	Takafumi Asahara (JPN)	Yan Yumin (CHN)
1994 Hiroshima	Bang Seung-hoon (KOR)	Hisham Al-Masri (SYR)	Masayuki Fujimoto (JPN)
1998 Bangkok	Torlarp Sethsothorn (THA)	Masato Hirano (JPN)	Mark Kwok (HKG)
2002 Busan	Shunichi Fujita (JPN)	Yu Cheng (CHN)	Han Kyu-chul (KOR)
2006 Doha	Park Tae-hwan (KOR)	Zhang Lin (CHN)	Takeshi Matsuda (JPN)
2010 Guangzhou	Park Tae-hwan (KOR)	Sun Yang (CHN)	Zhang Lin (CHN)
2014 Incheon	Sun Yang (CHN)	Kosuke Hagino (JPN)	Hao Yun (CHN)
2018 Jakarta–Palembang	Sun Yang (CHN)	Naito Ehara (JPN)	Kosuke Hagino (JPN)
2022 Hangzhou	Kim Woo-min (KOR)	Pan Zhanle (CHN)	Nguyễn Huy Hoàng (VIE)

=== 800 m freestyle ===
Games	Gold	Silver	Bronze
1951 New Delhi	Neo Chwee Kok (SIN)	Serafin Villanueva (PHI)	Mohammad Mala (PHI)
2018 Jakarta–Palembang	Sun Yang (CHN)	Shogo Takeda (JPN)	Nguyễn Huy Hoàng (VIE)
2022 Hangzhou	Kim Woo-min (KOR)	Fei Liwei (CHN)	Nguyễn Huy Hoàng (VIE)

=== 1500 m freestyle ===
Games	Gold	Silver	Bronze
1951 New Delhi	Neo Chwee Kok (SIN)	Mohammad Mala (PHI)	Serafin Villanueva (PHI)
1954 Manila	Yukiyoshi Aoki (JPN)	Shichiro Shintaku (JPN)	Tsutomu Nagashima (JPN)
1958 Tokyo	Tsuyoshi Yamanaka (JPN)	Hiroshi Ishii (JPN)	Bana Sailani (PHI)
1962 Jakarta	Tin Maung Ni (BIR)	Tohachiro Matsuki (JPN)	Toshiaki Sahara (JPN)
1966 Bangkok	Etsujiro Takase (JPN)	Katsuji Ito (JPN)	Tony Asamli (PHI)
1970 Bangkok	Cho Oh-ryun (KOR)	Akira Iida (JPN)	Toshinori Murata (JPN)
1974 Tehran	Cho Oh-ryun (KOR)	Shuji Ono (JPN)	Edwin Borja (PHI)
1978 Bangkok	Shuji Tsukasaki (JPN)	Takehiko Kawakami (JPN)	Mark Joseph (PHI)
1982 New Delhi	Kimihiro Anzai (JPN)	Keisuke Okuno (JPN)	William Wilson (PHI)
1986 Seoul	Wang Dali (CHN)	Shigeo Ogata (JPN)	He Runhua (CHN)
1990 Beijing	Masayuki Fujimoto (JPN)	Jeffrey Ong (MAL)	Masashi Kato (JPN)
1994 Hiroshima	Hisham Al-Masri (SYR)	Masato Hirano (JPN)	Fu Tao (CHN)
1998 Bangkok	Masato Hirano (JPN)	Torlarp Sethsothorn (THA)	Hisham Al-Masri (SYR)
2002 Busan	Yu Cheng (CHN)	Cho Sung-mo (KOR)	Han Kyu-chul (KOR)
2006 Doha	Park Tae-hwan (KOR)	Zhang Lin (CHN)	Takeshi Matsuda (JPN)
2010 Guangzhou	Sun Yang (CHN)	Park Tae-hwan (KOR)	Zhang Lin (CHN)
2014 Incheon	Sun Yang (CHN)	Kohei Yamamoto (JPN)	Wang Kecheng (CHN)
2018 Jakarta–Palembang	Sun Yang (CHN)	Nguyễn Huy Hoàng (VIE)	Ji Xinjie (CHN)
2022 Hangzhou	Fei Liwei (CHN)	Kim Woo-min (KOR)	Shogo Takeda (JPN)

=== 50 m backstroke ===
Games	Gold	Silver	Bronze
2006 Doha	Junya Koga (JPN)	Ouyang Kunpeng (CHN)	Sung Min (KOR)
2010 Guangzhou	Junya Koga (JPN)	Ryosuke Irie (JPN)	Cheng Feiyi (CHN)
2014 Incheon	Junya Koga (JPN)	Ryosuke Irie (JPN)	Xu Jiayu (CHN)
2018 Jakarta–Palembang	Xu Jiayu (CHN)	Ryosuke Irie (JPN)	Kang Ji-seok (KOR)
2022 Hangzhou	Xu Jiayu (CHN)	Wang Gukailai (CHN)	Ryosuke Irie (JPN)

=== 100 m backstroke ===
Games	Gold	Silver	Bronze
1951 New Delhi	Artemio Salamat (PHI)	Kanti Shah (IND)	Edilberto Bonus (PHI)
1954 Manila	Keiji Hase (JPN)	Norihiko Kurahashi (JPN)	Takuro Ashida (JPN)
1958 Tokyo	Keiji Hase (JPN)	Hideo Ninomiya (JPN)	Rodolfo Agustin (PHI)
1962 Jakarta	Kazuo Tomita (JPN)	Keisuke Ito (JPN)	Sampang Hassan (PHI)
1966 Bangkok	Yushiro Hayashi (JPN)	Kishio Tanaka (JPN)	Michael Eu (SIN)
1970 Bangkok	Tadashi Honda (JPN)	Koji Hoshino (JPN)	Hsu Tung-hsiung (ROC)
1974 Tehran	Tadashi Honda (JPN)	Gerardo Rosario (PHI)	Toshimitsu Yamamoto (JPN)
1978 Bangkok	Kenji Ikeda (JPN)	Tsuyoshi Takahashi (JPN)	Tang Qun (CHN)
1982 New Delhi	Kenji Ikeda (JPN)	Hidetoshi Takahashi (JPN)	Lukman Niode (INA)
1986 Seoul	Daichi Suzuki (JPN)	Shigemori Maruyama (JPN)	Wang Hao (CHN)
1990 Beijing	Lin Laijiu (CHN)	Hajime Itoi (JPN)	Keita Soraoka (JPN)
1994 Hiroshima	Hajime Itoi (JPN)	Eiji Komine (JPN)	Lin Laijiu (CHN)
1998 Bangkok	Alex Lim (MAS)	Fu Yong (CHN)	Raymond Papa (PHI)
2002 Busan	Atsushi Nishikori (JPN)	Alex Lim (MAS)	Tomomi Morita (JPN)
2006 Doha	Junichi Miyashita (JPN)	Ouyang Kunpeng (CHN)	Masafumi Yamaguchi (JPN)
2010 Guangzhou	Ryosuke Irie (JPN)	Junya Koga (JPN)	Sun Xiaolei (CHN)
2014 Incheon	Ryosuke Irie (JPN)	Xu Jiayu (CHN)	Kosuke Hagino (JPN)
2018 Jakarta–Palembang	Xu Jiayu (CHN)	Ryosuke Irie (JPN)	Lee Ju-ho (KOR)
2022 Hangzhou	Xu Jiayu (CHN)	Ryosuke Irie (JPN)	Lee Ju-ho (KOR)

=== 200 m backstroke ===
Games	Gold	Silver	Bronze
1958 Tokyo	Kazuo Tomita (JPN)	Kazuo Watanabe (JPN)	Lorenzo Cortez (PHI)
1962 Jakarta	Keisuke Ito (JPN)	Kazuo Tomita (JPN)	Poo Boen Tiong (INA)
1966 Bangkok	Shigeo Fukushima (JPN)	Yushiro Hayashi (JPN)	Alex Chan (SIN)
1970 Bangkok	Tadashi Honda (JPN)	Koji Hoshino (JPN)	Hsu Tung-hsiung (ROC)
1974 Tehran	Tadashi Honda (JPN)	Gerardo Rosario (PHI)	Toshimitsu Yamamoto (JPN)
1978 Bangkok	Tsuyoshi Takahashi (JPN)	Tang Qun (CHN)	Kenji Ikeda (JPN)
1982 New Delhi	Hidetoshi Takahashi (JPN)	Yang Xintian (CHN)	Lukman Niode (INA)
1986 Seoul	Kazuya Ikeda (JPN)	Lin Laijiu (CHN)	Shigemori Maruyama (JPN)
1990 Beijing	Ji Sang-jun (KOR)	Keita Soraoka (JPN)	Hajime Itoi (JPN)
1994 Hiroshima	Ji Sang-jun (KOR)	Hajime Itoi (JPN)	Ryuji Horii (JPN)
1998 Bangkok	Fu Yong (CHN)	Alex Lim (MAS)	Raymond Papa (PHI)
2002 Busan	Wu Peng (CHN)	Takashi Nakano (JPN)	Naoya Sonoda (JPN)
2006 Doha	Ryosuke Irie (JPN)	Ouyang Kunpeng (CHN)	Takashi Nakano (JPN)
2010 Guangzhou	Ryosuke Irie (JPN)	Zhang Fenglin (CHN)	Cheng Feiyi (CHN)
2014 Incheon	Ryosuke Irie (JPN)	Xu Jiayu (CHN)	Kosuke Hagino (JPN)
2018 Jakarta–Palembang	Xu Jiayu (CHN)	Ryosuke Irie (JPN)	Keita Sunama (JPN)
2022 Hangzhou	Xu Jiayu (CHN)	Lee Ju-ho (KOR)	Hidekazu Takehara (JPN)

=== 50 m breaststroke ===
Games	Gold	Silver	Bronze
2006 Doha	Vladislav Polyakov (KAZ)	Kosuke Kitajima (JPN)	Wang Haibo (CHN)
2010 Guangzhou	Xie Zhi (CHN)	Ryo Tateishi (JPN)	Li Xiayan (CHN)
2014 Incheon	Dmitriy Balandin (KAZ)	Yasuhiro Koseki (JPN)	Sandeep Sejwal (IND)
2018 Jakarta–Palembang	Yasuhiro Koseki (JPN)	Yan Zibei (CHN)	Dmitriy Balandin (KAZ)
2022 Hangzhou	Qin Haiyang (CHN)	Sun Jiajun (CHN)	Choi Dong-yeol (KOR)

=== 100 m breaststroke ===
Games	Gold	Silver	Bronze
1958 Tokyo	Masaru Ota (JPN)	Akio Sugiyama (JPN)	Li Che-sheng (ROC)
1962 Jakarta	Kenji Ishikawa (JPN)	Kiyoshi Nakagawa (JPN)	Jin Jang-rim (KOR)
1966 Bangkok	Kenji Ishikawa (JPN)	Koichi Yamanami (JPN)	Amman Jalmaani (PHI)
1970 Bangkok	Nobutaka Taguchi (JPN)	Amman Jalmaani (PHI)	Phath Sim Onn (KHM)
1974 Tehran	Nobutaka Taguchi (JPN)	Lu Huankai (CHN)	Kenichi Ueda (JPN)
1978 Bangkok	Shigehiro Takahashi (JPN)	Hiroshi Kabatani (JPN)	Wang Lin (CHN)
1982 New Delhi	Ye Runcheng (CHN)	Shigehiro Takahashi (JPN)	Jin Fu (CHN)
1986 Seoul	Jin Fu (CHN)	Hisashi Fuwa (JPN)	Kenji Watanabe (JPN)
1990 Beijing	Chen Jianhong (CHN)	Kenji Watanabe (JPN)	Nobuyuki Kawaguchi (JPN)
1994 Hiroshima	Akira Hayashi (JPN)	Wang Yiwu (CHN)	Chen Jianhong (CHN)
1998 Bangkok	Zeng Qiliang (CHN)	Akira Hayashi (JPN)	Elvin Chia (MAS)
2002 Busan	Kosuke Kitajima (JPN)	Zeng Qiliang (CHN)	Yoshihisa Yamaguchi (JPN)
2006 Doha	Kosuke Kitajima (JPN)	Makoto Yamashita (JPN)	Vladislav Polyakov (KAZ)
2010 Guangzhou	Ryo Tateishi (JPN)	Vladislav Polyakov (KAZ)	Wang Shuai (CHN)
2014 Incheon	Dmitriy Balandin (KAZ)	Yasuhiro Koseki (JPN)	Li Xiang (CHN)
2018 Jakarta–Palembang	Yasuhiro Koseki (JPN)	Yan Zibei (CHN)	Dmitriy Balandin (KAZ)
2022 Hangzhou	Qin Haiyang (CHN)	Yan Zibei (CHN)	Choi Dong-yeol (KOR)

=== 200 m breaststroke ===
Games	Gold	Silver	Bronze
1951 New Delhi	Jacinto Cayco (PHI)	Rene Amabuyok (PHI)	Jehangir Naegamwalla (IND)
1954 Manila	Mamoru Tanaka (JPN)	Masaru Furukawa (JPN)	Masao Togami (JPN)
1958 Tokyo	Masaru Furukawa (JPN)	Hsu Hsing-tai (ROC)	Hajime Waki (JPN)
1962 Jakarta	Kiyoshi Nakagawa (JPN)	Kenji Ishikawa (JPN)	Rolando Landrito (PHI)
1966 Bangkok	Koichi Yamanami (JPN)	Kenji Ishikawa (JPN)	Gershon Shefa (ISR)
1970 Bangkok	Nobutaka Taguchi (JPN)	Amman Jalmaani (PHI)	Kemalpasa Umih (PHI)
1974 Tehran	Nobutaka Taguchi (JPN)	Ding Youcai (CHN)	Kenichi Ueda (JPN)
1978 Bangkok	Shigehiro Takahashi (JPN)	Hiroshi Kabatani (JPN)	Wang Lin (CHN)
1982 New Delhi	Naritoshi Matsuda (JPN)	Jin Fu (CHN)	Shigehiro Takahashi (JPN)
1986 Seoul	Kenji Watanabe (JPN)	Naritoshi Matsuda (JPN)	Wirmandi Sugriat (INA)
1990 Beijing	Kenji Watanabe (JPN)	Nobuyuki Kawaguchi (JPN)	Wirmandi Sugriat (INA)
1994 Hiroshima	Wang Yiwu (CHN)	Akira Hayashi (JPN)	Ratapong Sirisanont (THA)
1998 Bangkok	Zhu Yi (CHN)	Ratapong Sirisanont (THA)	Yoshinobu Miyazaki (JPN)
2002 Busan	Kosuke Kitajima (JPN)	Daisuke Kimura (JPN)	Ratapong Sirisanont (THA)
2006 Doha	Kosuke Kitajima (JPN)	Daisuke Kimura (JPN)	Vladislav Polyakov (KAZ)
2010 Guangzhou	Naoya Tomita (JPN)	Xue Ruipeng (CHN)	Shared silver
2010 Guangzhou	Naoya Tomita (JPN)	Choi Kyu-woong (KOR)	Shared silver
2014 Incheon	Dmitriy Balandin (KAZ)	Kazuki Kohinata (JPN)	Yasuhiro Koseki (JPN)
2018 Jakarta–Palembang	Yasuhiro Koseki (JPN)	Ippei Watanabe (JPN)	Qin Haiyang (CHN)
2022 Hangzhou	Qin Haiyang (CHN)	Dong Zhihao (CHN)	Ippei Watanabe (JPN)

=== 50 m butterfly ===
Games	Gold	Silver	Bronze
2006 Doha	Zhou Jiawei (CHN)	Ryo Takayasu (JPN)	Wang Dong (CHN)
2010 Guangzhou	Zhou Jiawei (CHN)	Masayuki Kishida (JPN)	Virdhawal Khade (IND)
2014 Incheon	Shi Yang (CHN)	Joseph Schooling (SIN)	Yang Jung-doo (KOR)
2018 Jakarta–Palembang	Joseph Schooling (SGP)	Wang Peng (CHN)	Adilbek Mussin (KAZ)
2022 Hangzhou	Baek In-chul (KOR)	Teong Tzen Wei (SGP)	Adilbek Mussin (KAZ)

=== 100 m butterfly ===
Games	Gold	Silver	Bronze
1958 Tokyo	Takashi Ishimoto (JPN)	Fumiaki Masunaga (JPN)	Walter Brown (PHI)
1962 Jakarta	Kenzo Izutsu (JPN)	Koji Iwamoto (JPN)	Amir Hussin Hamsain (PHI)
1966 Bangkok	Isao Nakajima (JPN)	Avraham Melamed (ISR)	Yasuo Takada (JPN)
1970 Bangkok	Yasuhiro Komazaki (JPN)	Satoshi Maruya (JPN)	Hsu Tung-hsiung (ROC)
1974 Tehran	Hideaki Hara (JPN)	Luo Zhaoying (CHN)	Yasuhiro Komazaki (JPN)
1978 Bangkok	Shinsuke Kayama (JPN)	Luo Zhaoying (CHN)	Gerald Item (INA)
1982 New Delhi	Taihei Saka (JPN)	Chen Chao (CHN)	Ang Peng Siong (SIN)
1986 Seoul	Hiroshi Miura (JPN)	Zheng Jian (CHN)	Hiroshi Sato (JPN)
1990 Beijing	Shen Jianqiang (CHN)	Kunio Sugimoto (JPN)	Tomohiro Miyoshi (JPN)
1994 Hiroshima	Jiang Chengji (CHN)	Hajime Itoi (JPN)	Mitsuharu Takane (JPN)
1998 Bangkok	Takashi Yamamoto (JPN)	Zhang Xiao (CHN)	Han Kyu-chul (KOR)
2002 Busan	Takashi Yamamoto (JPN)	Kohei Kawamoto (JPN)	Jin Hao (CHN)
2006 Doha	Takashi Yamamoto (JPN)	Ryo Takayasu (JPN)	Wang Dong (CHN)
2010 Guangzhou	Zhou Jiawei (CHN)	Takuro Fujii (JPN)	Wu Peng (CHN)
2014 Incheon	Joseph Schooling (SIN)	Li Zhuhao (CHN)	Hirofumi Ikebata (JPN)
2018 Jakarta–Palembang	Joseph Schooling (SGP)	Li Zhuhao (CHN)	Yuki Kobori (JPN)
2022 Hangzhou	Katsuhiro Matsumoto (JPN)	Wang Changhao (CHN)	Adilbek Mussin (KAZ)

=== 200 m butterfly ===
Games	Gold	Silver	Bronze
1954 Manila	Parsons Nabiula (PHI)	Amado Jimenez (PHI)	Robert Collins (PHI)
1958 Tokyo	Takashi Ishimoto (JPN)	Koichi Hirakida (JPN)	Freddie Elizalde (PHI)
1962 Jakarta	Kenzo Izutsu (JPN)	Koji Iwamoto (JPN)	Amir Hussin Hamsain (PHI)
1966 Bangkok	Yasuo Takada (JPN)	Shinji Yamanouchi (JPN)	Leroy Goff (PHI)
1970 Bangkok	Yasuhiro Komazaki (JPN)	Satoshi Maruya (JPN)	Leroy Goff (PHI)
1974 Tehran	Yasuhiro Komazaki (JPN)	Hideaki Hara (JPN)	Luo Zhaoying (CHN)
1978 Bangkok	Shinsuke Kayama (JPN)	Gerald Item (INA)	Cho Oh-ryun (KOR)
1982 New Delhi	Taihei Saka (JPN)	Bang Jun-young (KOR)	Masakazu Hirata (JPN)
1986 Seoul	Hiroshi Sato (JPN)	Khajan Singh (IND)	Yukinori Tanaka (JPN)
1990 Beijing	Kunio Sugimoto (JPN)	Tomohiro Miyoshi (JPN)	Lee Yun-ahn (KOR)
1994 Hiroshima	Xue Wei (CHN)	Mitsuharu Takane (JPN)	Osamu Mihara (JPN)
1998 Bangkok	Takashi Yamamoto (JPN)	Xie Xufeng (CHN)	Han Kyu-chul (KOR)
2002 Busan	Wu Peng (CHN)	Takashi Yamamoto (JPN)	Takeshi Matsuda (JPN)
2006 Doha	Wu Peng (CHN)	Takeshi Matsuda (JPN)	Ryuichi Shibata (JPN)
2010 Guangzhou	Takeshi Matsuda (JPN)	Ryusuke Sakata (JPN)	Chen Yin (CHN)
2014 Incheon	Daiya Seto (JPN)	Kenta Hirai (JPN)	Joseph Schooling (SIN)
2018 Jakarta–Palembang	Daiya Seto (JPN)	Nao Horomura (JPN)	Li Zhuhao (CHN)
2022 Hangzhou	Tomoru Honda (JPN)	Wang Kuan-hung (TPE)	Chen Juner (CHN)

=== 200 m individual medley ===
Games	Gold	Silver	Bronze
1974 Tehran	Jiro Sasaki (JPN)	Tsuyoshi Yanagidate (JPN)	Jairulla Jaitulla (PHI)
1978 Bangkok	Tsuyoshi Yanagidate (JPN)	Kozo Tatsumi (JPN)	Gerald Item (INA)
1982 New Delhi	Li Zhongyi (CHN)	Keiichi Ohata (JPN)	Shinji Ito (JPN)
1986 Seoul	Naritoshi Matsuda (JPN)	Chen Qin (CHN)	Satoshi Takeda (JPN)
1990 Beijing	Takahiro Fujimoto (JPN)	Shuichi Nakamura (JPN)	Xie Jun (CHN)
1994 Hiroshima	Ratapong Sirisanont (THA)	Takahiro Fujimoto (JPN)	Tatsuya Kinugasa (JPN)
1998 Bangkok	Xiong Guoming (CHN)	Jo Yoshimi (JPN)	Xie Xufeng (CHN)
2002 Busan	Takahiro Mori (JPN)	Jiro Miki (JPN)	Ouyang Kunpeng (CHN)
2006 Doha	Hidemasa Sano (JPN)	Ken Takakuwa (JPN)	Han Kyu-chul (KOR)
2010 Guangzhou	Ken Takakuwa (JPN)	Wang Shun (CHN)	Yuya Horihata (JPN)
2014 Incheon	Kosuke Hagino (JPN)	Hiromasa Fujimori (JPN)	Wang Shun (CHN)
2018 Jakarta–Palembang	Wang Shun (CHN)	Kosuke Hagino (JPN)	Qin Haiyang (CHN)
2022 Hangzhou	Wang Shun (CHN)	Qin Haiyang (CHN)	Daiya Seto (JPN)

=== 400 m individual medley ===
Games	Gold	Silver	Bronze
1966 Bangkok	Shigeo Fukushima (JPN)	Gershon Shefa (ISR)	Tony Asamli (PHI)
1970 Bangkok	Toru Udo (JPN)	Junhachiro Tsutsumi (JPN)	Hsu Tung-hsiung (ROC)
1974 Tehran	Tsuyoshi Yanagidate (JPN)	Jiro Sasaki (JPN)	Luo Zhaoying (CHN)
1978 Bangkok	Kozo Tatsumi (JPN)	Tsuyoshi Yanagidate (JPN)	Gerald Item (INA)
1982 New Delhi	Keiichi Ohata (JPN)	Pan Jiazhang (CHN)	Shinji Ito (JPN)
1986 Seoul	Naritoshi Matsuda (JPN)	Satoshi Takeda (JPN)	Tian Liang (CHN)
1990 Beijing	Takahiro Fujimoto (JPN)	Shuichi Nakamura (JPN)	Kim Seong-tae (KOR)
1994 Hiroshima	Ratapong Sirisanont (THA)	Tatsuya Kinugasa (JPN)	Takahiro Fujimoto (JPN)
1998 Bangkok	Takahiro Mori (JPN)	Xiong Guoming (CHN)	Ratapong Sirisanont (THA)
2002 Busan	Wu Peng (CHN)	Takahiro Mori (JPN)	Shinya Taniguchi (JPN)
2006 Doha	Hidemasa Sano (JPN)	Shinya Taniguchi (JPN)	Han Kyu-chul (KOR)
2010 Guangzhou	Yuya Horihata (JPN)	Huang Chaosheng (CHN)	Ken Takakuwa (JPN)
2014 Incheon	Kosuke Hagino (JPN)	Yang Zhixian (CHN)	Daiya Seto (JPN)
2018 Jakarta–Palembang	Daiya Seto (JPN)	Kosuke Hagino (JPN)	Wang Shun (CHN)
2022 Hangzhou	Tomoru Honda (JPN)	Daiya Seto (JPN)	Wang Shun (CHN)

=== 4 × 100 m freestyle relay ===
Games	Gold	Silver	Bronze
1951 New Delhi	Singapore (SIN); Wiebe Wolters; Lionel Chee; Barry Mitchell; Neo Chwee Kok	Philippines (PHI); Nurhatab Rajab; Mohammad Mala; Serafin Villanueva; Sotero Alcantara	India (IND); Isaac Mansoor; Bimal Chandra; Sambhu Saha; Sachin Nag
1970 Bangkok	Japan (JPN); Shojiro Sawa; Kunihiro Iwasaki; Noboru Waseda; Satoshi Maruya	Philippines (PHI); Dae Imlani; Carlos Brosas; Kemalpasa Umih; Jairulla Jaitulla	Khmer Republic (KHM); Eat Kim Heng; Tieng Sok; Prak Samnang; Tan Bunthay
1974 Tehran	Japan (JPN); Shinya Izumi; Yukio Horiuchi; Jiro Sasaki; Akira Iida	China (CHN)	Philippines (PHI); Dae Imlani; Edwin Borja; Gerardo Rosario; Sukarno Maut
1978 Bangkok	Japan (JPN); Hiroshi Sakamoto; Shinya Izumi; Shigeki Yamazaki; Tsuyoshi Yanagidate	China (CHN); Cui Fang; Huang Guangliang; Mo Zhengjie; Zhong Guiyu	Indonesia (INA); Gerald Item; Dwi Widjayanto; John David Item; Kristiono Sumono
1982 New Delhi	China (CHN); Huang Guohua; Huang Guangliang; Wan Qiang; Li Zhongyi	Japan (JPN); Satoshi Sumida; Takuya Osumi; Ikuhiro Terashita; Taihei Saka	Indonesia (INA); Zain Chaidir; John David Item; Gerald Item; Lukman Niode
1986 Seoul	China (CHN); Shen Jianqiang; Yang Qing; Mu Lati; Feng Qiangbiao	Japan (JPN); Keisuke Okuno; Shigeo Ogata; Hiroshi Miura; Katsunori Fujiwara	Singapore (SIN); Ang Peng Siong; David Lim; Tay Khoon Hean; Oon Jin Gee
1990 Beijing	China (CHN); Xie Jun; Feng Qiangbiao; Wang Dali; Shen Jianqiang	Japan (JPN); Masakatsu Usami; Ken Nakazawa; Hidetoshi Yamanaka; Katsunori Fujiwara	Singapore (SIN); Ang Peng Siong; Harold Gan; David Lim; Kenneth Yeo
1994 Hiroshima	Japan (JPN); Hiroshi Fukuda; Makio Endo; Masakatsu Usami; Yukihiro Matsushita	Kazakhstan (KAZ); Alexey Khovrin; Alexey Yegorov; Sergey Ushkalov; Sergey Borisenko	Uzbekistan (UZB); Oleg Tsvetkovskiy; Vyacheslav Kabanov; Oleg Pukhnatiy; Aleksandr Agafonov
1998 Bangkok	Japan (JPN); Hirosuke Hamano; Shunsuke Ito; Tomohiro Yamanoi; Shusuke Ito	China (CHN); Wang Chuan; Deng Qingsong; Zhang Qiang; Zhao Lifeng	Kazakhstan (KAZ); Igor Sitnikov; Sergey Borisenko; Pavel Sidorov; Andrey Kvassov
2002 Busan	China (CHN); Huang Shaohua; Jin Hao; Chen Zuo; Liu Yu	Japan (JPN); Naoki Nagura; Yoshihiro Okumura; Daisuke Hosokawa; Hiroaki Akebe	South Korea (KOR); Sung Min; Koh Yun-ho; Kim Min-suk; Han Kyu-chul
2006 Doha	Japan (JPN); Takamitsu Kojima; Hiroaki Yamamoto; Makoto Ito; Daisuke Hosokawa	China (CHN); Huang Shaohua; Chen Zuo; Cai Li; Qu Jingyu	South Korea (KOR); Han Kyu-chul; Sung Min; Lim Nam-gyun; Park Tae-hwan
2010 Guangzhou	China (CHN); Shi Tengfei; Jiang Haiqi; Shi Runqiang; Lü Zhiwu; Chen Zuo; Liu Junwu	Japan (JPN); Takuro Fujii; Rammaru Harada; Shunsuke Kuzuhara; Sho Uchida; Yuki Kobori; Yoshihiro Okumura	South Korea (KOR); Kim Yong-sik; Bae Joon-mo; Park Seon-kwan; Park Tae-hwan; Jung Won-yong; Kim Min-gyu; Lee Hyun-seung; Park Min-kyu
2014 Incheon	China (CHN); Yu Hexin; Lin Yongqing; Sun Yang; Ning Zetao; Hao Yun; Xu Qiheng; Liu Junwu	Japan (JPN); Shinri Shioura; Rammaru Harada; Takuro Fujii; Katsumi Nakamura; Kenta Ito	Hong Kong (HKG); Geoffrey Cheah; Jeremy Wong; Derick Ng; Kent Cheung; Raymond Mak; David Wong
2018 Jakarta–Palembang	Japan (JPN); Shinri Shioura; Katsuhiro Matsumoto; Katsumi Nakamura; Juran Mizohata	China (CHN); Yang Jintong; Cao Jiwen; Sun Yang; Yu Hexin; Hou Yujie; Qian Zhiyong; Ma Tianchi; Ji Xinjie	Singapore (SGP); Quah Zheng Wen; Joseph Schooling; Darren Chua; Darren Lim; Danny Yeo; Jonathan Tan
2022 Hangzhou	China (CHN); Pan Zhanle; Chen Juner; Hong Jinquan; Wang Haoyu; Wang Shun; Wang Changhao; Yang Jintong	South Korea (KOR); Ji Yu-chan; Lee Ho-joon; Kim Ji-hun; Hwang Sun-woo; Yang Jae-hoon; Lee Yoo-yeon; Kim Young-beom	Japan (JPN); Katsumi Nakamura; Katsuhiro Matsumoto; Taikan Tanaka; Tomonobu Gomi; Shinri Shioura

=== 4 × 200 m freestyle relay ===
Games	Gold	Silver	Bronze
1954 Manila	Japan (JPN); Kenzo Yoshimura; Teijiro Tanikawa; Yukiyoshi Aoki; Hiroshi Suzuki	Singapore (SIN); Ong Choon Lim; Tan Teow Choon; Lionel Chee; Neo Chwee Kok	Philippines (PHI); Rolando Santos; Bertulfo Cachero; Angel Colmenares; Bana Sailani
1958 Tokyo	Japan (JPN); Tsuyoshi Yamanaka; Makoto Fukui; Tatsuo Fujimoto; Toshizo Umemoto	Philippines (PHI); Agapito Lozada; Ulpiano Babol; Bana Sailani; Dakula Arabani	Republic of China (ROC); Lin Min-shan; Sun Ke-chun; Li Che-sheng; Kao Chia-hung
1962 Jakarta	Japan (JPN); Akikazu Takemoto; Tadaharu Goto; Keigo Shimizu; Toshizo Umemoto	Indonesia (INA)	Philippines (PHI); Roosevelt Abdulgafur; Bana Sailani; Haylil Said; Victorino Marcelino
1966 Bangkok	Japan (JPN); Kunihiro Iwasaki; Teruhiko Kitani; Katsuji Ito; Haruo Yoshimuta	Philippines (PHI); Leroy Goff; Haylil Said; Tony Asamli; Roosevelt Abdulgafur	Thailand (THA); Anant Pleanboonlert; Duang Kongchareon; Narong Chokumnuay; Somchai Limpichat
1970 Bangkok	Japan (JPN); Noboru Waseda; Kunihiro Iwasaki; Akira Iida; Toshinori Murata	Philippines (PHI); Jairulla Jaitulla; Dae Imlani; Kemalpasa Umih; Leroy Goff	Singapore (SIN); Alex Chan; Soh Seng Hoi; Roy Chan; Tan Thuan Heng
1974 Tehran	Japan (JPN); Shunji Nakanishi; Yukio Horiuchi; Akira Iida; Kaname Sakamoto	China (CHN)	Philippines (PHI); Kemalpasa Umih; Dae Imlani; Sukarno Maut; Gerardo Rosario
1978 Bangkok	Japan (JPN); Kazuhiko Yoshihara; Hiroshi Sakamoto; Shigeki Yamazaki; Tsuyoshi Yanagidate	Indonesia (INA); Dwi Widjayanto; John David Item; Gerald Item; Kristiono Sumono	Philippines (PHI); Vicente Cheng; Mark Joseph; Jairulla Jaitulla; Gerardo Rosario
1982 New Delhi	Japan (JPN); Ikuhiro Terashita; Takuya Osumi; Akifumi Nishimuta; Taihei Saka	China (CHN); Huang Guohua; Wu Jinhuang; Pan Jiazhang; Li Zhongyi	Indonesia (INA); Ridwan Muis; John David Item; Gerald Item; Lukman Niode
1986 Seoul	Japan (JPN); Keisuke Okuno; Shigeo Ogata; Tomohiro Noguchi; Katsunori Fujiwara	China (CHN); Chen Suwei; He Runhua; Xie Jun; Wang Dali	Singapore (SIN); Oon Jin Gee; David Lim; Oon Jin Teik; Tay Khoon Hean
1990 Beijing	Japan (JPN); Hidetoshi Yamanaka; Katsunori Fujiwara; Takafumi Asahara; Tomohiro Noguchi	China (CHN); Yan Yumin; Wang Dali; Chen Suwei; Xie Jun	South Korea (KOR); Ji Sang-jun; Lim Cheol-seong; Kwon Sang-won; Lee Yun-ahn
1994 Hiroshima	Japan (JPN); Taihei Maeda; Yukihiro Matsushita; Masayuki Fujimoto; Kazunori Hikida	South Korea (KOR); Ji Sang-jun; Woo Chul; Woo Won-ki; Bang Seung-hoon	Thailand (THA); Vicha Ratanachote; Dulyarit Phuangthong; Pawin Kohvathana; Torlarp Sethsothorn
1998 Bangkok	Japan (JPN); Hideaki Hara; Shunsuke Ito; Shusuke Ito; Yosuke Ichikawa	China (CHN); Wang Chuan; Du Jie; Xiong Guoming; Deng Qingsong	South Korea (KOR); Kim Bang-hyun; Woo Chul; Koh Yun-ho; Han Kyu-chul
2002 Busan	Japan (JPN); Shunichi Fujita; Yoshihiro Okumura; Daisuke Hosokawa; Yosuke Ichikawa	China (CHN); Wu Peng; Chen Zuo; Yu Cheng; Liu Yu	South Korea (KOR); Choi Won-il; Koh Yun-ho; Kim Bang-hyun; Han Kyu-chul
2006 Doha	Japan (JPN); Takeshi Matsuda; Yuji Sakurai; Takamitsu Kojima; Daisuke Hosokawa	China (CHN); Yu Chenglong; Zhang Enjian; Chen Zuo; Zhang Lin	South Korea (KOR); Lim Nam-gyun; Han Kyu-chul; Kang Yong-hwan; Park Tae-hwan
2010 Guangzhou	China (CHN); Zhang Lin; Jiang Haiqi; Li Yunqi; Sun Yang; Dai Jun; Jiang Yuhui; Zhang Enjian	Japan (JPN); Yuki Kobori; Sho Uchida; Shunsuke Kuzuhara; Takeshi Matsuda; Yoshihiro Okumura	South Korea (KOR); Bae Joon-mo; Jang Sang-jin; Lee Hyun-seung; Park Tae-hwan; Kim Yong-sik; Park Min-kyu
2014 Incheon	Japan (JPN); Yuki Kobori; Kosuke Hagino; Daiya Seto; Takeshi Matsuda	China (CHN); Li Yunqi; Lin Yongqing; Mao Feilian; Xu Qiheng	Singapore (SIN); Danny Yeo; Pang Sheng Jun; Teo Zhen Ren; Clement Lim
2018 Jakarta–Palembang	Japan (JPN); Naito Ehara; Reo Sakata; Kosuke Hagino; Katsuhiro Matsumoto; Juran Mizohata; Ayatsugu Hirai; Yuki Kobori	China (CHN); Ji Xinjie; Shang Keyuan; Wang Shun; Sun Yang; Qiu Ziao; Hong Jinlong; Hou Yujie; Qian Zhiyong	Singapore (SGP); Quah Zheng Wen; Joseph Schooling; Danny Yeo; Jonathan Tan; Darren Chua; Glen Lim
2022 Hangzhou	South Korea (KOR); Yang Jae-hoon; Lee Ho-joon; Kim Woo-min; Hwang Sun-woo; Lee Yoo-yeon; Kim Gun-woo	China (CHN); Wang Shun; Niu Guangsheng; Wang Haoyu; Pan Zhanle; Fei Liwei; Hong Jinquan; Zhang Ziyang	Japan (JPN); Hidenari Mano; Tomoru Honda; Taikan Tanaka; Katsuhiro Matsumoto; So Ogata

=== 4 × 100 m medley relay ===
- 3 × 100 m medley relay: 1951

Games	Gold	Silver	Bronze
1951 New Delhi	Philippines (PHI); Artemio Salamat; Jacinto Cayco; Nurhatab Rajab	Singapore (SIN); Lionel Chee; Tan Hwee Hock; Neo Chwee Kok	India (IND); Kanti Shah; Jehangir Naegamwalla; Sachin Nag
1958 Tokyo	Japan (JPN); Keiji Hase; Masaru Furukawa; Takashi Ishimoto; Manabu Koga	Philippines (PHI); Rodolfo Agustin; Jacinto Cayco; Freddie Elizalde; Dakula Arabani	Indonesia (INA); Tio Tjoe Hong; Abdul Rasjid; Lie Tjoan Kiet; Habib Nasution
1962 Jakarta	Japan (JPN); Kazuo Tomita; Kenji Ishikawa; Kenzo Izutsu; Keigo Shimizu	Philippines (PHI); Sampang Hassan; Antonio Saloso; Amir Hussin Hamsain; Roosevelt Abdulgafur	Indonesia (INA); Kemal Lubis; Abdul Rasjid; Sudarman; Achmad Dimyati
1966 Bangkok	Japan (JPN); Shigeo Fukushima; Kenji Ishikawa; Isao Nakajima; Kunihiro Iwasaki	Israel (ISR); Joram Shnider; Gershon Shefa; Avraham Melamed; Moshe Gertel	Philippines (PHI); Eduardo Abreu; Amman Jalmaani; Leroy Goff; Roosevelt Abdulgafur
1970 Bangkok	Japan (JPN); Tadashi Honda; Nobutaka Taguchi; Satoshi Maruya; Shojiro Sawa	Philippines (PHI); Ibnorajik Muksan; Amman Jalmaani; Leroy Goff; Jairulla Jaitulla	Israel (ISR); Yoav Yaakovi; Yohan Kende; Dan Stern; Moshe Gertel
1974 Tehran	Japan (JPN); Tadashi Honda; Nobutaka Taguchi; Hideaki Hara; Shinya Izumi	China (CHN)	Philippines (PHI); Gerardo Rosario; Amman Jalmaani; Mazier Mukaram; Jairulla Jaitulla
1978 Bangkok	Japan (JPN); Kenji Ikeda; Shigehiro Takahashi; Shinsuke Kayama; Shigeki Yamazaki	China (CHN); Tang Qun; Wang Lin; Fan Liuke; Lu Zhurong	Indonesia (INA); Lukman Niode; Kun Hantyo; Gerald Item; Dwi Widjayanto
1982 New Delhi	Japan (JPN); Kenji Ikeda; Shigehiro Takahashi; Taihei Saka; Satoshi Sumida	China (CHN); Yang Xintian; Ye Runcheng; Chen Chao; Li Zhongyi	Indonesia (INA); Lukman Niode; Faezal Mulyawan; John David Item; Gerald Item
1986 Seoul	Japan (JPN); Daichi Suzuki; Hisashi Fuwa; Hiroshi Miura; Katsunori Fujiwara	China (CHN); Wang Hao; Jin Fu; Zheng Jian; Shen Jianqiang	Indonesia (INA); Lukman Niode; Wirmandi Sugriat; Sabeni Sudiono; Daniel Arief Budiman
1990 Beijing	China (CHN); Lin Laijiu; Chen Jianhong; Shen Jianqiang; Xie Jun	Japan (JPN); Hajime Itoi; Kenji Watanabe; Kunio Sugimoto; Katsunori Fujiwara	South Korea (KOR); Ji Sang-jun; Yun Ju-il; Lee Yun-ahn; Kim Dong-hyeon
1994 Hiroshima	Japan (JPN); Eiji Komine; Akira Hayashi; Hajime Itoi; Yukihiro Matsushita	China (CHN); Lin Laijiu; Wang Yiwu; Jiang Chengji; Qiu Jieming	Kazakhstan (KAZ); Sergey Ushkalov; Alexandr Savitskiy; Andrey Gavrilov; Sergey Borisenko
1998 Bangkok	Japan (JPN); Atsushi Nishikori; Akira Hayashi; Takashi Yamamoto; Shunsuke Ito	China (CHN); Fu Yong; Zeng Qiliang; Zhang Xiao; Deng Qingsong	Kazakhstan (KAZ); Pavel Sidorov; Alexandr Savitskiy; Andrey Gavrilov; Igor Sitnikov
2002 Busan	Japan (JPN); Atsushi Nishikori; Kosuke Kitajima; Takashi Yamamoto; Yoshihiro Okumura	China (CHN); Ouyang Kunpeng; Zeng Qiliang; Jin Hao; Chen Zuo	South Korea (KOR); Sung Min; Son Sung-uk; Yoo Jung-nam; Koh Yun-ho
2006 Doha	Japan (JPN); Junichi Miyashita; Kosuke Kitajima; Takashi Yamamoto; Daisuke Hosokawa	China (CHN); Ouyang Kunpeng; Lai Zhongjian; Wang Dong; Chen Zuo	South Korea (KOR); Sung Min; You Seung-hun; Jeong Doo-hee; Park Tae-hwan
2010 Guangzhou	Japan (JPN); Ryosuke Irie; Ryo Tateishi; Takuro Fujii; Rammaru Harada; Kosuke Kitajima; Masayuki Kishida; Shunsuke Kuzuhara	South Korea (KOR); Park Seon-kwan; Choi Kyu-woong; Jeong Doo-hee; Park Tae-hwan; Kim Ji-heun; Chang Gyu-cheol; Park Min-kyu	Kazakhstan (KAZ); Stanislav Ossinskiy; Vladislav Polyakov; Fedor Shkilyov; Stanislav Kuzmin; Yevgeniy Ryzhkov; Rustam Khudiyev; Artur Dilman
2014 Incheon	China (CHN); Xu Jiayu; Li Xiang; Li Zhuhao; Ning Zetao; Jin Yan; Mao Feilian; Wang Yuxin; Yu Hexin	Japan (JPN); Ryosuke Irie; Yasuhiro Koseki; Hirofumi Ikebata; Shinri Shioura	Uzbekistan (UZB); Daniil Bukin; Vladislav Mustafin; Islam Aslanov; Khurshidjon Tursunov; Dmitriy Shvetsov; Aleksey Derlyugov; Daniil Tulupov
2018 Jakarta–Palembang	China (CHN); Xu Jiayu; Yan Zibei; Li Zhuhao; Yu Hexin; Li Guangyuan; Qin Haiyang; Zheng Xiaojing; He Junyi	Japan (JPN); Ryosuke Irie; Yasuhiro Koseki; Yuki Kobori; Shinri Shioura; Masaki Kaneko; Ippei Watanabe; Nao Horomura; Katsumi Nakamura	Kazakhstan (KAZ); Adil Kaskabay; Dmitriy Balandin; Adilbek Mussin; Alexandr Varakin
2022 Hangzhou	China (CHN); Xu Jiayu; Qin Haiyang; Wang Changhao; Pan Zhanle; Wang Shun; Yan Zibei; Sun Jiajun; Wang Haoyu	South Korea (KOR); Lee Ju-ho; Choi Dong-yeol; Kim Young-beom; Hwang Sun-woo; Cho Sung-jae; Kim Ji-hun; Lee Ho-joon	Japan (JPN); Ryosuke Irie; Yuya Hinomoto; Katsuhiro Matsumoto; Katsumi Nakamura; Daiki Yanagawa; Naoki Mizunuma

=== 10 km marathon ===
Games	Gold	Silver	Bronze
2022 Hangzhou	Zhang Ziyang (CHN)	Lan Tianchen (CHN)	Park Jae-hun (KOR)

== Women ==
=== 50 m freestyle ===
Games	Gold	Silver	Bronze
1990 Beijing	Yang Wenyi (CHN)	Sun Chunli (CHN)	Naoko Imoto (JPN)
1994 Hiroshima	Naoko Imoto (JPN)	Sumika Minamoto (JPN)	Robyn Lamsam (HKG)
1998 Bangkok	Shan Ying (CHN)	Han Xue (CHN)	Sumika Minamoto (JPN)
2002 Busan	Xu Yanwei (CHN)	Sun So-eun (KOR)	Zhou Xiaowei (CHN)
2006 Doha	Xu Yanwei (CHN)	Pang Jiaying (CHN)	Kaori Yamada (JPN)
2010 Guangzhou	Li Zhesi (CHN)	Tang Yi (CHN)	Yayoi Matsumoto (JPN)
2014 Incheon	Chen Xinyi (CHN)	Miki Uchida (JPN)	Tang Yi (CHN)
2018 Jakarta–Palembang	Rikako Ikee (JPN)	Liu Xiang (CHN)	Wu Qingfeng (CHN)
2022 Hangzhou	Zhang Yufei (CHN)	Siobhán Haughey (HKG)	Cheng Yujie (CHN)

=== 100 m freestyle ===
Games	Gold	Silver	Bronze
1954 Manila	Haydee Coloso (PHI)	Tomiko Atarashi (JPN)	Shizue Miyabe (JPN)
1958 Tokyo	Yoshiko Sato (JPN)	Haydee Coloso-Espino (PHI)	Hitomi Jinno (JPN)
1962 Jakarta	Yoshiko Sato (JPN)	Toyoko Kimura (JPN)	Haydee Coloso-Espino (PHI)
1966 Bangkok	Michiko Kihara (JPN)	Helen Elliott (PHI)	Yvonne Tobis (ISR)
1970 Bangkok	Yoshimi Nishigawa (JPN)	Shigeko Kawanishi (JPN)	Pat Chan (SIN)
1974 Tehran	Yoshimi Nishigawa (JPN)	Motoko Osawa (JPN)	Elaine Sng (SIN)
1978 Bangkok	Sachiko Yamazaki (JPN)	Shiho Sakanishi (JPN)	Ratchaneewan Bulakul (THA)
1982 New Delhi	Kaori Yanase (JPN)	Chikako Nakamori (JPN)	Li Sha (CHN)
1986 Seoul	Yoko Shimao (JPN)	Xia Fujie (CHN)	Huang Hong (CHN)
1990 Beijing	Zhuang Yong (CHN)	Wang Xiaohong (CHN)	Suzu Chiba (JPN)
1994 Hiroshima	Shan Ying (CHN)	Naoko Imoto (JPN)	Sumika Minamoto (JPN)
1998 Bangkok	Shan Ying (CHN)	Chao Na (CHN)	Shared silver
1998 Bangkok	Shan Ying (CHN)	Sumika Minamoto (JPN)	Shared silver
2002 Busan	Xu Yanwei (CHN)	Yang Yu (CHN)	Shared silver
2002 Busan	Xu Yanwei (CHN)	Tomoko Nagai (JPN)	Shared silver
2006 Doha	Xu Yanwei (CHN)	Pang Jiaying (CHN)	Kaori Yamada (JPN)
2010 Guangzhou	Tang Yi (CHN)	Li Zhesi (CHN)	Haruka Ueda (JPN)
2014 Incheon	Shen Duo (CHN)	Tang Yi (CHN)	Miki Uchida (JPN)
2018 Jakarta–Palembang	Rikako Ikee (JPN)	Zhu Menghui (CHN)	Yang Junxuan (CHN)
2022 Hangzhou	Siobhán Haughey (HKG)	Yang Junxuan (CHN)	Cheng Yujie (CHN)

=== 200 m freestyle ===
Games	Gold	Silver	Bronze
1958 Tokyo	Yoshiko Sato (JPN)	Haydee Coloso-Espino (PHI)	Ryoko Omiya (JPN)
1962 Jakarta	Yoshiko Sato (JPN)	Yumiko Kobayashi (JPN)	Corazon Lozada (PHI)
1966 Bangkok	Michiko Kihara (JPN)	Helen Elliott (PHI)	Kazue Hayakawa (JPN)
1970 Bangkok	Yoshimi Nishigawa (JPN)	Shigeko Kawanishi (JPN)	Pat Chan (SIN)
1974 Tehran	Yoshimi Nishigawa (JPN)	Fusae Nakamura (JPN)	Elaine Sng (SIN)
1978 Bangkok	Ratchaneewan Bulakul (THA)	Junie Sng (SIN)	Sachiko Yamazaki (JPN)
1982 New Delhi	Kaori Yanase (JPN)	Mika Saito (JPN)	Li Miaohe (CHN)
1986 Seoul	Chikako Nakamori (JPN)	Miki Saito (JPN)	Nurul Huda Abdullah (MAL)
1990 Beijing	Zhuang Yong (CHN)	Suzu Chiba (JPN)	Shen Xiaoyu (CHN)
1994 Hiroshima	Le Ying (CHN)	Eri Yamanoi (JPN)	Suzu Chiba (JPN)
1998 Bangkok	Tsai Shu-min (TPE)	Qin Caini (CHN)	Sachiko Yamada (JPN)
2002 Busan	Yang Yu (CHN)	Xu Yanwei (CHN)	Tomoko Nagai (JPN)
2006 Doha	Pang Jiaying (CHN)	Yang Yu (CHN)	Maki Mita (JPN)
2010 Guangzhou	Zhu Qianwei (CHN)	Tang Yi (CHN)	Hanae Ito (JPN)
2014 Incheon	Shen Duo (CHN)	Chihiro Igarashi (JPN)	Tang Yi (CHN)
2018 Jakarta–Palembang	Li Bingjie (CHN)	Yang Junxuan (CHN)	Chihiro Igarashi (JPN)
2022 Hangzhou	Siobhán Haughey (HKG)	Li Bingjie (CHN)	Liu Yaxin (CHN)

=== 400 m freestyle ===
Games	Gold	Silver	Bronze
1954 Manila	Misako Tamura (JPN)	Akiko Miyazaki (JPN)	Yoshiko Sato (JPN)
1958 Tokyo	Emiko Shibahara (JPN)	Gertrudes Lozada (PHI)	Eiko Wada (JPN)
1962 Jakarta	Toyoko Kimura (JPN)	Kazue Hayakawa (JPN)	Corazon Lozada (PHI)
1966 Bangkok	Kazue Hayakawa (JPN)	Helen Elliott (PHI)	Miwako Kobayashi (JPN)
1970 Bangkok	Tae Iguchi (JPN)	Pat Chan (SIN)	Eiko Goshi (JPN)
1974 Tehran	Fusae Nakamura (JPN)	Elaine Sng (SIN)	Atsuko Sakai (JPN)
1978 Bangkok	Junie Sng (SIN)	Kana Kamo (JPN)	Ratchaneewan Bulakul (THA)
1982 New Delhi	Mika Saito (JPN)	Junko Sakurai (JPN)	Lee See-eun (KOR)
1986 Seoul	Yan Ming (CHN)	Nurul Huda Abdullah (MAL)	Miki Wakahoi (JPN)
1990 Beijing	Yan Ming (CHN)	Shen Xiaoyu (CHN)	Suzu Chiba (JPN)
1994 Hiroshima	Suzu Chiba (JPN)	Sachiko Miyaji (JPN)	Jeong Won-kyung (KOR)
1998 Bangkok	Chen Hua (CHN)	Sachiko Yamada (JPN)	Tsai Shu-min (TPE)
2002 Busan	Sachiko Yamada (JPN)	Chen Hua (CHN)	Tang Jingzhi (CHN)
2006 Doha	Yang Jieqiao (CHN)	Zhu Wenrui (CHN)	Lee Ji-eun (KOR)
2010 Guangzhou	Shao Yiwen (CHN)	Liu Jing (CHN)	Seo Youn-jeong (KOR)
2014 Incheon	Zhang Yuhan (CHN)	Bi Yirong (CHN)	Chihiro Igarashi (JPN)
2018 Jakarta–Palembang	Wang Jianjiahe (CHN)	Li Bingjie (CHN)	Chihiro Igarashi (JPN)
2022 Hangzhou	Li Bingjie (CHN)	Ma Yonghui (CHN)	Waka Kobori (JPN)

=== 800 m freestyle ===
Games	Gold	Silver	Bronze
1978 Bangkok	Junie Sng (SIN)	Kana Kamo (JPN)	Magumi Tochihara (JPN)
1982 New Delhi	Naomi Sekido (JPN)	Junko Sakurai (JPN)	Lee See-eun (KOR)
1986 Seoul	Yan Ming (CHN)	Nurul Huda Abdullah (MAL)	Miki Wakahoi (JPN)
1990 Beijing	Yan Ming (CHN)	Shen Xiaoyu (CHN)	Tomomi Hosoda (JPN)
1994 Hiroshima	Luo Ping (CHN)	Tomoko Goza (JPN)	Sachiko Miyaji (JPN)
1998 Bangkok	Chen Hua (CHN)	Sachiko Yamada (JPN)	Eri Yamanoi (JPN)
2002 Busan	Chen Hua (CHN)	Sachiko Yamada (JPN)	Zhang Yan (CHN)
2006 Doha	Yurie Yano (JPN)	Yang Jieqiao (CHN)	Maiko Fujino (JPN)
2010 Guangzhou	Li Xuanxu (CHN)	Shao Yiwen (CHN)	Maiko Fujino (JPN)
2014 Incheon	Bi Yirong (CHN)	Xu Danlu (CHN)	Asami Chida (JPN)
2018 Jakarta–Palembang	Wang Jianjiahe (CHN)	Li Bingjie (CHN)	Waka Kobori (JPN)
2022 Hangzhou	Li Bingjie (CHN)	Waka Kobori (JPN)	Yang Peiqi (CHN)

=== 1500 m freestyle ===
Games	Gold	Silver	Bronze
2018 Jakarta–Palembang	Wang Jianjiahe (CHN)	Li Bingjie (CHN)	Waka Kobori (JPN)
2022 Hangzhou	Li Bingjie (CHN)	Gao Weizhong (CHN)	Yukimi Moriyama (JPN)

=== 50 m backstroke ===
Games	Gold	Silver	Bronze
2006 Doha	Zhao Jing (CHN)	Gao Chang (CHN)	Reiko Nakamura (JPN)
2010 Guangzhou	Gao Chang (CHN)	Aya Terakawa (JPN)	Xu Tianlongzi (CHN)
2014 Incheon	Fu Yuanhui (CHN)	Yekaterina Rudenko (KAZ)	Miyuki Takemura (JPN)
2018 Jakarta–Palembang	Liu Xiang (CHN)	Fu Yuanhui (CHN)	Natsumi Sakai (JPN)
2022 Hangzhou	Wang Xueer (CHN)	Wan Letian (CHN)	Miki Takahashi (JPN)

=== 100 m backstroke ===
Games	Gold	Silver	Bronze
1954 Manila	Jocelyn von Giese (PHI)	Keiko Sadamori (JPN)	Midori Morimae (JPN)
1958 Tokyo	Satoko Tanaka (JPN)	Setsuko Okamoto (JPN)	Sylvia von Giese (PHI)
1962 Jakarta	Satoko Tanaka (JPN)	Hiromi Yotsumoto (JPN)	Oey Lian Nio (INA)
1966 Bangkok	Satoko Tanaka (JPN)	Kimiko Gabe (JPN)	Pat Chan (SIN)
1970 Bangkok	Yukiko Goshi (JPN)	Kikuyo Ishii (JPN)	Pat Chan (SIN)
1974 Tehran	Suzuko Matsumura (JPN)	Taeko Sudo (JPN)	Yeo Su Ming (SIN)
1978 Bangkok	Hisae Asari (JPN)	Naoko Miura (JPN)	Choi Yun-jung (KOR)
1982 New Delhi	Choi Yun-hui (KOR)	Choi Yun-jung (KOR)	Koto Maeda (JPN)
1986 Seoul	Choi Yun-hui (KOR)	Kaoru Ono (JPN)	Naomi Sekido (JPN)
1990 Beijing	Yang Wenyi (CHN)	Lin Li (CHN)	Satomi Oguri (JPN)
1994 Hiroshima	He Cihong (CHN)	Miki Nakao (JPN)	Mai Nakamura (JPN)
1998 Bangkok	Tomoko Hagiwara (JPN)	Mai Nakamura (JPN)	Choi Soo-min (KOR)
2002 Busan	Zhan Shu (CHN)	Noriko Inada (JPN)	Aya Terakawa (JPN)
2006 Doha	Reiko Nakamura (JPN)	Xu Tianlongzi (CHN)	Zhao Jing (CHN)
2010 Guangzhou	Zhao Jing (CHN)	Shiho Sakai (JPN)	Gao Chang (CHN)
2014 Incheon	Fu Yuanhui (CHN)	Yekaterina Rudenko (KAZ)	Wang Xueer (CHN)
2018 Jakarta–Palembang	Natsumi Sakai (JPN)	Anna Konishi (JPN)	Chen Jie (CHN)
2022 Hangzhou	Wan Letian (CHN)	Wang Xueer (CHN)	Lee Eun-ji (KOR)

=== 200 m backstroke ===
Games	Gold	Silver	Bronze
1978 Bangkok	Hisae Asari (JPN)	Naoko Miura (JPN)	Choi Yun-jung (KOR)
1982 New Delhi	Choi Yun-hui (KOR)	Choi Yun-jung (KOR)	Hisae Asari (JPN)
1986 Seoul	Choi Yun-hui (KOR)	Naomi Sekido (JPN)	Hiroyo Harada (JPN)
1990 Beijing	Lin Li (CHN)	Wang Hui (CHN)	Satomi Oguri (JPN)
1994 Hiroshima	He Cihong (CHN)	Liu Bichun (CHN)	Miki Nakao (JPN)
1998 Bangkok	Tomoko Hagiwara (JPN)	Mai Nakamura (JPN)	Shim Min-ji (KOR)
2002 Busan	Reiko Nakamura (JPN)	Aya Terakawa (JPN)	Zhan Shu (CHN)
2006 Doha	Reiko Nakamura (JPN)	Zhao Jing (CHN)	Takami Igarashi (JPN)
2010 Guangzhou	Zhao Jing (CHN)	Shiho Sakai (JPN)	Aya Terakawa (JPN)
2014 Incheon	Sayaka Akase (JPN)	Chen Jie (CHN)	Nguyễn Thị Ánh Viên (VIE)
2018 Jakarta–Palembang	Liu Yaxin (CHN)	Natsumi Sakai (JPN)	Peng Xuwei (CHN)
2022 Hangzhou	Peng Xuwei (CHN)	Liu Yaxin (CHN)	Lee Eun-ji (KOR)

=== 50 m breaststroke ===
Games	Gold	Silver	Bronze
2006 Doha	Ji Liping (CHN)	Asami Kitagawa (JPN)	Wang Qun (CHN)
2010 Guangzhou	Wang Randi (CHN)	Zhao Jin (CHN)	Satomi Suzuki (JPN)
2014 Incheon	Satomi Suzuki (JPN)	Suo Ran (CHN)	He Yuzhe (CHN)
2018 Jakarta–Palembang	Satomi Suzuki (JPN)	Roanne Ho (SGP)	Feng Junyang (CHN)
2022 Hangzhou	Tang Qianting (CHN)	Satomi Suzuki (JPN)	Siobhán Haughey (HKG)

=== 100 m breaststroke ===
Games	Gold	Silver	Bronze
1958 Tokyo	Yoshiko Takamatsu (JPN)	Masayo Aoki (JPN)	Ria Tobing (INA)
1962 Jakarta	Noriko Yamamoto (JPN)	Iris Tobing (INA)	Sachiko Aoki (JPN)
1966 Bangkok	Yoshiko Morizane (JPN)	Sakiko Yamashita (JPN)	Umbhai Inphang (THA)
1970 Bangkok	Hitomi Tanigami (JPN)	Chieno Shibata (JPN)	Shlomit Nir (ISR)
1974 Tehran	Toshiko Haruoka (JPN)	Yoko Yamamoto (JPN)	Nancy Deano (PHI)
1978 Bangkok	Chieko Watanabe (JPN)	Liang Weifen (CHN)	Chiharu Mori (JPN)
1982 New Delhi	Hiroko Nagasaki (JPN)	Kim Myong-suk (PRK)	Shao Hong (CHN)
1986 Seoul	Huang Xiaomin (CHN)	Hiroko Nagasaki (JPN)	Xia Fujie (CHN)
1990 Beijing	Huang Xiaomin (CHN)	Kyoko Kasuya (JPN)	Asako Natsume (JPN)
1994 Hiroshima	Dai Guohong (CHN)	Masami Tanaka (JPN)	Hitomi Maehara (JPN)
1998 Bangkok	Li Wei (CHN)	Xu Shan (CHN)	Masami Tanaka (JPN)
2002 Busan	Luo Xuejuan (CHN)	Qi Hui (CHN)	Fumiko Kawanabe (JPN)
2006 Doha	Asami Kitagawa (JPN)	Ji Liping (CHN)	Back Su-yeon (KOR)
2010 Guangzhou	Ji Liping (CHN)	Satomi Suzuki (JPN)	Chen Huijia (CHN)
2014 Incheon	Shi Jinglin (CHN)	Kanako Watanabe (JPN)	He Yun (CHN)
2018 Jakarta–Palembang	Satomi Suzuki (JPN)	Reona Aoki (JPN)	Shi Jinglin (CHN)
2022 Hangzhou	Reona Aoki (JPN)	Satomi Suzuki (JPN)	Yang Chang (CHN)

=== 200 m breaststroke ===
Games	Gold	Silver	Bronze
1954 Manila	Masayo Aoki (JPN)	Kazuko Sakamoto (JPN)	Chizuko Urahata (JPN)
1958 Tokyo	Yoshiko Takamatsu (JPN)	Noriko Odagiri (JPN)	Victoria Cagayat (PHI)
1962 Jakarta	Noriko Yamamoto (JPN)	Sachiko Aoki (JPN)	Iris Tobing (INA)
1966 Bangkok	Sakiko Yamashita (JPN)	Yoshiko Morizane (JPN)	Chintana Thongrat (THA)
1970 Bangkok	Chieno Shibata (JPN)	Hitomi Tanigami (JPN)	Shlomit Nir (ISR)
1974 Tehran	Toshiko Haruoka (JPN)	Yoko Yamamoto (JPN)	Nancy Deano (PHI)
1978 Bangkok	Chieko Watanabe (JPN)	Chiharu Mori (JPN)	Liang Weifen (CHN)
1982 New Delhi	Hiroko Nagasaki (JPN)	Kim Myong-suk (PRK)	Liang Weifen (CHN)
1986 Seoul	Hiroko Nagasaki (JPN)	Asako Natsume (JPN)	Park Sung-won (KOR)
1990 Beijing	Lin Li (CHN)	Huang Xiaomin (CHN)	Kyoko Kasuya (JPN)
1994 Hiroshima	Yuan Yuan (CHN)	Dai Guohong (CHN)	Masami Tanaka (JPN)
1998 Bangkok	Masami Tanaka (JPN)	Qi Hui (CHN)	Junko Isoda (JPN)
2002 Busan	Qi Hui (CHN)	Luo Xuejuan (CHN)	Fumiko Kawanabe (JPN)
2006 Doha	Qi Hui (CHN)	Luo Nan (CHN)	Jung Seul-ki (KOR)
2010 Guangzhou	Jeong Da-rae (KOR)	Sun Ye (CHN)	Ji Liping (CHN)
2014 Incheon	Kanako Watanabe (JPN)	Rie Kaneto (JPN)	Shi Jinglin (CHN)
2018 Jakarta–Palembang	Kanako Watanabe (JPN)	Yu Jingyao (CHN)	Reona Aoki (JPN)
2022 Hangzhou	Ye Shiwen (CHN)	Kwon Se-hyun (KOR)	Runa Imai (JPN)

=== 50 m butterfly ===
Games	Gold	Silver	Bronze
2006 Doha	Tao Li (SIN)	Xu Yanwei (CHN)	Yuka Kato (JPN)
2010 Guangzhou	Tao Li (SIN)	Yuka Kato (JPN)	Lu Ying (CHN)
2014 Incheon	Lu Ying (CHN)	Tao Li (SIN)	Liu Lan (CHN)
2018 Jakarta–Palembang	Rikako Ikee (JPN)	Wang Yichun (CHN)	Lin Xintong (CHN)
2022 Hangzhou	Zhang Yufei (CHN)	Yu Yiting (CHN)	Rikako Ikee (JPN)

=== 100 m butterfly ===
Games	Gold	Silver	Bronze
1954 Manila	Haydee Coloso (PHI)	Norma Yldefonso (PHI)	Sandra von Giese (PHI)
1958 Tokyo	Shizue Miyabe (JPN)	Sandra von Giese (PHI)	Tatsuyo Teragaito (JPN)
1962 Jakarta	Eiko Takahashi (JPN)	Michiyo Nakanishi (JPN)	Gertrudes Lozada (PHI)
1966 Bangkok	Masako Ishii (JPN)	Eiko Takahashi (JPN)	Gertrudes Lozada (PHI)
1970 Bangkok	Mayumi Aoki (JPN)	Kazuyo Banno (JPN)	Tay Chin Joo (SIN)
1974 Tehran	Yasue Hatsuda (JPN)	Yukari Takemoto (JPN)	Tay Chin Joo (SIN)
1978 Bangkok	Yasue Hatsuda (JPN)	Naoko Kume (JPN)	Shao Tongmei (CHN)
1982 New Delhi	Takemi Ise (JPN)	Kiyomi Takahashi (JPN)	Lin Fan (CHN)
1986 Seoul	Qian Hong (CHN)	Yoko Kawahigashi (JPN)	Kiyomi Takahashi (JPN)
1990 Beijing	Wang Xiaohong (CHN)	Qian Hong (CHN)	Yoko Kando (JPN)
1994 Hiroshima	Liu Limin (CHN)	Qu Yun (CHN)	Joscelin Yeo (SIN)
1998 Bangkok	Ayari Aoyama (JPN)	Ruan Yi (CHN)	Hitomi Kashima (JPN)
2002 Busan	Zhou Yafei (CHN)	Yuko Nakanishi (JPN)	Joscelin Yeo (SIN)
2006 Doha	Zhou Yafei (CHN)	Xu Yanwei (CHN)	Tao Li (SIN)
2010 Guangzhou	Jiao Liuyang (CHN)	Tao Li (SIN)	Yuka Kato (JPN)
2014 Incheon	Chen Xinyi (CHN)	Lu Ying (CHN)	Tao Li (SIN)
2018 Jakarta–Palembang	Rikako Ikee (JPN)	Zhang Yufei (CHN)	An Se-hyeon (KOR)
2022 Hangzhou	Zhang Yufei (CHN)	Ai Soma (JPN)	Wang Yichun (CHN)

=== 200 m butterfly ===
Games	Gold	Silver	Bronze
1978 Bangkok	Yasue Hatsuda (JPN)	Naoko Kume (JPN)	Nunung Selowati (INA)
1982 New Delhi	Kiyomi Takahashi (JPN)	Takemi Ise (JPN)	Kim Kum-hee (KOR)
1986 Seoul	Izumi Kawahara (JPN)	Kiyomi Takahashi (JPN)	Lee Eun-hee (KOR)
1990 Beijing	Wang Xiaohong (CHN)	Qian Hong (CHN)	Rie Shito (JPN)
1994 Hiroshima	Liu Limin (CHN)	Hong Shu (CHN)	Mika Haruna (JPN)
1998 Bangkok	Cho Hee-yeon (KOR)	Ruan Yi (CHN)	Hitomi Kashima (JPN)
2002 Busan	Yuko Nakanishi (JPN)	Maki Mita (JPN)	Liu Yin (CHN)
2006 Doha	Yurie Yano (JPN)	Choi Hye-ra (KOR)	Yuko Nakanishi (JPN)
2010 Guangzhou	Jiao Liuyang (CHN)	Natsumi Hoshi (JPN)	Choi Hye-ra (KOR)
2014 Incheon	Jiao Liuyang (CHN)	Natsumi Hoshi (JPN)	Miyu Nakano (JPN)
2018 Jakarta–Palembang	Zhang Yufei (CHN)	Sachi Mochida (JPN)	Suzuka Hasegawa (JPN)
2022 Hangzhou	Zhang Yufei (CHN)	Yu Liyan (CHN)	Hiroko Makino (JPN)

=== 200 m individual medley ===
Games	Gold	Silver	Bronze
1966 Bangkok	Yasuko Fujii (JPN)	Yvonne Tobis (ISR)	Pat Chan (SIN)
1970 Bangkok	Yoshimi Nishigawa (JPN)	Yukari Takemoto (JPN)	Pat Chan (SIN)
1974 Tehran	Yoshimi Nishigawa (JPN)	Yukari Takemoto (JPN)	Nancy Deano (PHI)
1978 Bangkok	Mie Hirata (JPN)	Yuko Imamichi (JPN)	Liang Weifen (CHN)
1982 New Delhi	Choi Yun-hui (KOR)	Hideka Koshimizu (JPN)	Shared silver
1982 New Delhi	Choi Yun-hui (KOR)	Choi Yun-jung (KOR)	Shared silver
1986 Seoul	Naomi Sekido (JPN)	Hiroyo Harada (JPN)	Choi Yun-hui (KOR)
1990 Beijing	Lin Li (CHN)	Fumie Kurotori (JPN)	Xia Fujie (CHN)
1994 Hiroshima	Dai Guohong (CHN)	Hitomi Maehara (JPN)	Hideko Hiranaka (JPN)
1998 Bangkok	Wu Yanyan (CHN)	Chen Yan (CHN)	Cho Hee-yeon (KOR)
2002 Busan	Qi Hui (CHN)	Zhou Yafei (CHN)	Maiko Fujino (JPN)
2006 Doha	Qi Hui (CHN)	Asami Kitagawa (JPN)	Maiko Fujino (JPN)
2010 Guangzhou	Ye Shiwen (CHN)	Wang Qun (CHN)	Choi Hye-ra (KOR)
2014 Incheon	Ye Shiwen (CHN)	Kanako Watanabe (JPN)	Miho Teramura (JPN)
2018 Jakarta–Palembang	Kim Seo-yeong (KOR)	Yui Ohashi (JPN)	Miho Teramura (JPN)
2022 Hangzhou	Yu Yiting (CHN)	Ye Shiwen (CHN)	Kim Seo-yeong (KOR)

=== 400 m individual medley ===
Games	Gold	Silver	Bronze
1978 Bangkok	Mie Hirata (JPN)	Yuko Imamichi (JPN)	Naniek Suwadji (INA)
1982 New Delhi	Hideka Koshimizu (JPN)	Naomi Sekido (JPN)	Lee See-eun (KOR)
1986 Seoul	Yan Ming (CHN)	Naomi Sekido (JPN)	Nurul Huda Abdullah (MAL)
1990 Beijing	Lin Li (CHN)	Yan Ming (CHN)	Fumie Kurotori (JPN)
1994 Hiroshima	Lin Li (CHN)	Dai Guohong (CHN)	Hitomi Maehara (JPN)
1998 Bangkok	Yasuko Tajima (JPN)	Wu Yanyan (CHN)	Chen Yan (CHN)
2002 Busan	Qi Hui (CHN)	Maiko Fujino (JPN)	Zhou Yafei (CHN)
2006 Doha	Qi Hui (CHN)	Yu Rui (CHN)	Maiko Fujino (JPN)
2010 Guangzhou	Ye Shiwen (CHN)	Li Xuanxu (CHN)	Cheng Wan-jung (TPE)
2014 Incheon	Ye Shiwen (CHN)	Sakiko Shimizu (JPN)	Nguyễn Thị Ánh Viên (VIE)
2018 Jakarta–Palembang	Yui Ohashi (JPN)	Kim Seo-yeong (KOR)	Sakiko Shimizu (JPN)
2022 Hangzhou	Yu Yiting (CHN)	Ageha Tanigawa (JPN)	Mio Narita (JPN)

=== 4 × 100 m freestyle relay ===
Games	Gold	Silver	Bronze
1954 Manila	Japan (JPN); Sadako Yamashita; Shizue Miyabe; Misako Tamura; Tomiko Atarashi	Philippines (PHI); Sonia von Giese; Gertrudes Vito; Nimfa Lim; Haydee Coloso	Republic of China (ROC); Kwok Ngan-hung; Tsui Shiu-ling; Chang Zoe-chee; Chan Sin-yi
1958 Tokyo	Japan (JPN); Yoshiko Sato; Setsuko Shimada; Shigeyo Nakaoki; Hitomi Jinno	Philippines (PHI); Victoria Cullen; Corazon Lozada; Gertrudes Lozada; Haydee Coloso-Espino	Republic of China (ROC); Wang Song-yu; Fung Ying-chu; Leung Chiu-bing; Ou Yuen-ling
1962 Jakarta	Japan (JPN); Toyoko Kimura; Kimiko Ezaka; Taeko Tsujimoto; Yoshiko Sato	Philippines (PHI); Connie Paredes; Corazon Lozada; Gertrudes Lozada; Haydee Coloso-Espino	Indonesia (INA); Enny Nuraeni; Lie Lan Hoa; Lie Mu Lhan; Lie Ying Hoa
1966 Bangkok	Japan (JPN); Ryoko Urakami; Kazue Hayakawa; Miwako Kobayashi; Michiko Kihara	Philippines (PHI); Helen Elliott; Tessie Lozada; Gertrudes Lozada; Corazon Lozada	Singapore (SIN); Tay Chin Joo; Jovina Tseng; Molly Tay; Pat Chan
1970 Bangkok	Japan (JPN); Shigeko Kawanishi; Yukiko Goshi; Yukari Takemoto; Yoshimi Nishigawa	Singapore (SIN); Elaine Sng; Jovina Tseng; Tay Chin Joo; Pat Chan	Republic of China (ROC); Shen Bao-ni; Wang Dai-yu; Hsu Yue-yun; Shen Pei-ni
1974 Tehran	Japan (JPN); Hiroko Kaneda; Motoko Osawa; Kayo Shibata; Yoshimi Nishigawa	China (CHN)	Singapore (SIN); Justina Tseng; Esther Tan; Tay Chin Joo; Elaine Sng
1978 Bangkok	Japan (JPN); Sachiko Yamazaki; Shiho Sakanishi; Mika Saito; Makiko Takahashi	China (CHN); Lou Yinghua; Liu Yafang; Cheng Fengying; Yu Ping	Thailand (THA); Sumatana Pingkalawan; Sirirat Changkasiri; Sansanee Changkasiri; Ratchaneewan Bulakul
1982 New Delhi	Japan (JPN); Yumi Okazaki; Chikako Nakamori; Mika Saito; Kaori Yanase	China (CHN); Li Miaohe; Bao Hong; Lin Fan; Li Sha	Singapore (SIN); Lai May May; Gillian Chee; Mavis Ee; Chan Mui Pin
1986 Seoul	China (CHN); Xia Fujie; Huang Hong; Zhou Xun; Qian Hong	Japan (JPN); Yoko Shimao; Miki Wakahoi; Miki Saito; Chikako Nakamori	Hong Kong (HKG); Fenella Ng; Celeste Hung; Fu Mui; Suzanna Lee
1990 Beijing	China (CHN); Zhuang Yong; Qian Hong; Wang Xiaohong; Yang Wenyi	South Korea (KOR); Kim Eun-jeong; Myeong Kyeong-hyeon; Lee Moon-hee; Lee Eun-ju	Indonesia (INA); Khim Tjia Fei; Meitri Widya Pangestika; Yen Yen Gunawan; Elfira Rosa Nasution
1994 Hiroshima	Japan (JPN); Sumika Minamoto; Naoko Imoto; Eri Yamanoi; Suzu Chiba	Hong Kong (HKG); Lau King Ting; Fenella Ng; Vivian Lee; Robyn Lamsam	South Korea (KOR); Lee Bo-eun; Bae Yun-kyung; Lee Jie-hyun; Jeong Won-kyung
1998 Bangkok	China (CHN); Shan Ying; Qian Min; Han Xue; Chao Na	Japan (JPN); Kaori Yamada; Ayari Aoyama; Sumika Minamoto; Junko Nakatani	Chinese Taipei (TPE); Tsai Shu-min; Chiang Tzu-ying; Lin Chi-chan; Lin Meng-chieh
2002 Busan	China (CHN); Yang Yu; Zhu Yingwen; Ju Jielei; Xu Yanwei	Japan (JPN); Maki Mita; Tomoko Nagai; Norie Urabe; Sachiko Yamada	South Korea (KOR); Ryu Yoon-ji; Kim Hyun-joo; Shim Min-ji; Sun So-eun
2006 Doha	China (CHN); Xu Yanwei; Yang Yu; Wang Dan; Pang Jiaying	Japan (JPN); Norie Urabe; Maki Mita; Kaori Yamada; Haruka Ueda	Hong Kong (HKG); Hannah Wilson; Sherry Tsai; Lee Leong Kwai; Sze Hang Yu
2010 Guangzhou	China (CHN); Li Zhesi; Wang Shijia; Zhu Qianwei; Tang Yi	Japan (JPN); Haruka Ueda; Yayoi Matsumoto; Tomoko Hagiwara; Hanae Ito	Hong Kong (HKG); Sze Hang Yu; Yu Wai Ting; Stephanie Au; Hannah Wilson
2014 Incheon	China (CHN); Ye Shiwen; Shen Duo; Zhang Yufei; Tang Yi; Qiu Yuhan; Chen Xinyi; Sun Meichen; Zhou Yilin	Japan (JPN); Miki Uchida; Misaki Yamaguchi; Kanako Watanabe; Yayoi Matsumoto; Yasuko Miyamoto	Hong Kong (HKG); Camille Cheng; Stephanie Au; Sze Hang Yu; Siobhán Haughey
2018 Jakarta–Palembang	Japan (JPN); Rikako Ikee; Natsumi Sakai; Tomomi Aoki; Chihiro Igarashi; Mayuka Yamamoto; Rio Shirai	China (CHN); Zhu Menghui; Wu Yue; Wu Qingfeng; Yang Junxuan; Wang Jingzhuo; Lao Lihui; Liu Xiaohan	Hong Kong (HKG); Camille Cheng; Stephanie Au; Tam Hoi Lam; Sze Hang Yu; Tinky Ho
2022 Hangzhou	China (CHN); Yang Junxuan; Cheng Yujie; Wu Qingfeng; Zhang Yufei; Li Bingjie; Yu Yiting; Liu Yaxin	Japan (JPN); Nagisa Ikemoto; Chihiro Igarashi; Rikako Ikee; Rio Shirai	Hong Kong (HKG); Camille Cheng; Siobhán Haughey; Tam Hoi Lam; Stephanie Au; Natalie Kan

=== 4 × 200 m freestyle relay ===
Games	Gold	Silver	Bronze
1998 Bangkok	China (CHN); Qin Caini; Qian Min; Yang Lina; Chen Hua	Japan (JPN); Junko Nakatani; Sachiko Yamada; Yasuko Tajima; Eri Yamanoi	Chinese Taipei (TPE); Chiang Tzu-ying; Lin Chi-chan; Kuan Chia-hsien; Tsai Shu-min
2002 Busan	China (CHN); Zhu Yingwen; Tang Jingzhi; Xu Yanwei; Yang Yu	Japan (JPN); Maki Mita; Tomoko Nagai; Sachiko Yamada; Norie Urabe	South Korea (KOR); Ha Eun-ju; Kim Ye-sul; Kim Hyun-joo; Shim Min-ji
2006 Doha	China (CHN); Tang Yi; Yang Yu; Tang Jingzhi; Pang Jiaying	Japan (JPN); Maki Mita; Norie Urabe; Haruka Ueda; Yurie Yano	South Korea (KOR); Lee Keo-ra; Park Na-ri; Jung Yoo-jin; Lee Ji-eun
2010 Guangzhou	China (CHN); Zhu Qianwei; Liu Jing; Wang Shijia; Tang Yi	Japan (JPN); Hanae Ito; Haruka Ueda; Yayoi Matsumoto; Risa Sekine	South Korea (KOR); Park Na-ri; Choi Hye-ra; Lee Jae-young; Seo Youn-jeong
2014 Incheon	China (CHN); Guo Junjun; Tang Yi; Cao Yue; Shen Duo	Japan (JPN); Chihiro Igarashi; Yasuko Miyamoto; Yayoi Matsumoto; Aya Takano	Hong Kong (HKG); Camille Cheng; Stephanie Au; Sze Hang Yu; Siobhán Haughey
2018 Jakarta–Palembang	China (CHN); Li Bingjie; Wang Jianjiahe; Zhang Yuhan; Yang Junxuan; Shen Duo; Ai Yanhan; Wu Yue	Japan (JPN); Chihiro Igarashi; Rikako Ikee; Yui Ohashi; Rio Shirai; Waka Kobori; Sachi Mochida	Hong Kong (HKG); Tinky Ho; Camille Cheng; Katii Tang; Sze Hang Yu; Jamie Yeung; Natalie Kan; Chan Kin Lok
2022 Hangzhou	China (CHN); Liu Yaxin; Cheng Yujie; Li Bingjie; Li Jiaping; Wu Qingfeng; Ge Chutong; Yang Peiqi	Japan (JPN); Rio Shirai; Nagisa Ikemoto; Waka Kobori; Miyu Namba; Mio Narita; Hiroko Makino	South Korea (KOR); Kim Seo-yeong; Hur Yeon-kyung; Park Su-jin; Han Da-kyung; Lee Eun-ji; Jeong So-eun

=== 4 × 100 m medley relay ===
Games	Gold	Silver	Bronze
1958 Tokyo	Philippines (PHI); Jocelyn von Giese; Victoria Cagayat; Sandra von Giese; Haydee Coloso-Espino	Republic of China (ROC); Fung Ying-chu; Chang Zoe-chee; Leung Chiu-bing; Ou Yuen-ling	None awarded
1962 Jakarta	Japan (JPN); Satoko Tanaka; Noriko Yamamoto; Eiko Takahashi; Yoshiko Sato	Indonesia (INA); Oey Lian Nio; Iris Tobing; Lie Lan Hoa; Enny Nuraeni	Philippines (PHI); Tessie Lozada; Dolores Agustin; Gertrudes Lozada; Haydee Coloso-Espino
1966 Bangkok	Japan (JPN); Kimiko Gabe; Yoshiko Morizane; Masako Ishii; Michiko Kihara	Philippines (PHI); Rosalina Abreu; Hedy Garcia; Gertrudes Lozada; Helen Elliott	Indonesia (INA); Winny Han; Fay Loa; Liem Hong Ing; Enny Nuraeni
1970 Bangkok	Japan (JPN); Yukiko Goshi; Mayumi Aoki; Chieno Shibata; Yoshimi Nishigawa	Singapore (SIN); Pat Chan; Tay Chin Joo; Esther Tan; Elaine Sng	Philippines (PHI); Luz Arzaga; Hedy Garcia; Susan Papa; Luz Laciste
1974 Tehran	Japan (JPN); Suzuko Matsumura; Toshiko Haruoka; Yasue Hatsuda; Yoshimi Nishigawa	Singapore (SIN); Yeo Su Ming; Justina Tseng; Tay Chin Joo; Elaine Sng	Philippines (PHI); Grace Justimbaste; Nancy Deano; Susan Papa; Betina Abdula
1978 Bangkok	Japan (JPN); Hisae Asari; Chieko Watanabe; Yasue Hatsuda; Sachiko Yamazaki	China (CHN); Chen Weiying; Liang Weifen; Shao Tongmei; Liang Xiuqiong	Indonesia (INA); Naniek Suwadji; Anita Sapardjiman; Tati Irianti Erningpraja; Nunung Selowati
1982 New Delhi	Japan (JPN); Koto Maeda; Hiroko Nagasaki; Takemi Ise; Kaori Yanase	China (CHN); Zhang Zhixin; Shao Hong; Lin Fan; Bao Hong	South Korea (KOR); Choi Yun-hui; Kwen Woo-jung; Kim Kum-hee; Choi Yun-jung
1986 Seoul	Japan (JPN); Kaoru Ono; Hiroko Nagasaki; Yoko Kawahigashi; Yoko Shimao	China (CHN); Zhou Xun; Huang Xiaomin; Qian Hong; Xia Fujie	South Korea (KOR); Choi Yun-hui; Park Sung-won; Lee Hong-mi; Kim Jin-suk
1990 Beijing	China (CHN); Yang Wenyi; Huang Xiaomin; Wang Xiaohong; Zhuang Yong	Japan (JPN); Satomi Oguri; Kyoko Kasuya; Yoko Kando; Suzu Chiba	South Korea (KOR); Lee Chang-ha; Park Sung-won; Yoo Hong-mi; Kim Su-jin
1994 Hiroshima	China (CHN); He Cihong; Dai Guohong; Liu Limin; Shan Ying	Japan (JPN); Miki Nakao; Masami Tanaka; Mika Haruna; Suzu Chiba	South Korea (KOR); Lee Ji-hyun; Byun Ju-mee; Lee Dong-sook; Lee Bo-eun
1998 Bangkok	Japan (JPN); Tomoko Hagiwara; Masami Tanaka; Ayari Aoyama; Sumika Minamoto	China (CHN); Wu Yanyan; Li Wei; Ruan Yi; Shan Ying	South Korea (KOR); Shim Min-ji; Kye Yoon-hee; Cho Hee-yeon; Lee Bo-eun
2002 Busan	China (CHN); Zhan Shu; Luo Xuejuan; Zhou Yafei; Xu Yanwei	Japan (JPN); Noriko Inada; Fumiko Kawanabe; Yuko Nakanishi; Tomoko Nagai	South Korea (KOR); Shim Min-ji; Ku Hyo-jin; Park Kyung-hwa; Sun So-eun
2006 Doha	China (CHN); Zhao Jing; Luo Nan; Zhou Yafei; Pang Jiaying	Japan (JPN); Reiko Nakamura; Asami Kitagawa; Yuko Nakanishi; Maki Mita	South Korea (KOR); Lee Nam-eun; Jung Seul-ki; Shin Hae-in; Ryu Yoon-ji
2010 Guangzhou	China (CHN); Zhao Jing; Chen Huijia; Jiao Liuyang; Tang Yi	Japan (JPN); Aya Terakawa; Satomi Suzuki; Yuka Kato; Haruka Ueda	Hong Kong (HKG); Claudia Lau; Fiona Ma; Sze Hang Yu; Hannah Wilson
2014 Incheon	Japan (JPN); Shiho Sakai; Kanako Watanabe; Natsumi Hoshi; Miki Uchida; Miyu Nakano	South Korea (KOR); Lee Da-lin; Yang Ji-won; An Se-hyeon; Ko Mi-so	Hong Kong (HKG); Stephanie Au; Yvette Kong; Sze Hang Yu; Siobhán Haughey; Claudia Lau; Jamie Yeung; Chan Kin Lok; Tam Hoi Lam
2018 Jakarta–Palembang	Japan (JPN); Natsumi Sakai; Satomi Suzuki; Rikako Ikee; Tomomi Aoki; Anna Konishi; Reona Aoki; Ai Soma; Sakiko Shimizu	Hong Kong (HKG); Stephanie Au; Jamie Yeung; Chan Kin Lok; Camille Cheng; Toto Wong; Rainbow Ip; Sze Hang Yu; Tam Hoi Lam	Singapore (SGP); Hoong En Qi; Samantha Yeo; Quah Jing Wen; Quah Ting Wen; Cherlyn Yeoh
2022 Hangzhou	Japan (JPN); Miki Takahashi; Reona Aoki; Ai Soma; Nagisa Ikemoto; Hiroko Makino	South Korea (KOR); Lee Eun-ji; Ko Ha-ru; Kim Seo-yeong; Hur Yeon-kyung; Kim Hye-jin; Park Su-jin; Jeong So-eun	Hong Kong (HKG); Stephanie Au; Siobhán Haughey; Natalie Kan; Tam Hoi Lam; Cindy Cheung; Lam Hoi Kiu; Yeung Hoi Ching; Camille Cheng

=== 10 km marathon ===
Games	Gold	Silver	Bronze
2022 Hangzhou	Wu Shutong (CHN)	Airi Ebina (JPN)	Sun Jiake (CHN)

== Mixed ==
=== 4 × 100 m medley relay ===
Games	Gold	Silver	Bronze
2018 Jakarta–Palembang	China (CHN); Xu Jiayu; Yan Zibei; Zhang Yufei; Zhu Menghui; Li Guangyuan; Shi Jinglin; Zheng Xiaojing; Yang Junxuan	Japan (JPN); Ryosuke Irie; Yasuhiro Koseki; Rikako Ikee; Tomomi Aoki; Masaki Kaneko; Ippei Watanabe; Mayuka Yamamoto	South Korea (KOR); Lee Ju-ho; Moon Jae-kwon; An Se-hyeon; Ko Mi-so; Kang Ji-seok; Kim Jae-youn; Park Ye-rin; Kim Min-ju
2022 Hangzhou	China (CHN); Xu Jiayu; Qin Haiyang; Zhang Yufei; Yang Junxuan; Wang Shun; Yan Zibei; Wang Yichun; Cheng Yujie	Japan (JPN); Ryosuke Irie; Yuya Hinomoto; Ai Soma; Nagisa Ikemoto; Hidekazu Takehara; Ippei Watanabe; Hiroko Makino	South Korea (KOR); Lee Eun-ji; Choi Dong-yeol; Kim Seo-yeong; Hwang Sun-woo; Lee Ju-ho; Hur Yeon-kyung
