= Japan at the 1970 Asian Games =

- IOC code: JPN
- NOC: Japanese Olympic Committee

in Bangkok
- Competitors: 221 in 13 sports
- Flag bearer: Yuzo Nakamura
- Medals Ranked 1st: Gold 74 Silver 47 Bronze 23 Total 144

Asian Games appearances (overview)
- 1951; 1954; 1958; 1962; 1966; 1970; 1974; 1978; 1982; 1986; 1990; 1994; 1998; 2002; 2006; 2010; 2014; 2018; 2022; 2026

Japan participated in the 1970 Asian Games held in Bangkok, Thailand from August 24, 1970 to September 4, 1970. This country was ranked 1st with 74 gold, 47 silver and 23 bronze medals, making a total of 144 medals in all.

== Medalists ==
Medal	Name	Sport	Event
Gold	Masahide Jinno	Athletics	Men's 100 m
Gold	Yoshiharu Tomonaga	Athletics	Men's 400 m
Gold	Susumu Noro	Athletics	Men's 1500 m
Gold	Chikashi Watanabe	Athletics	Men's 110 m hurdles
Gold	Yukitaka Shigeta	Athletics	Men's 400 m hurdles
Gold	Nobuyoshi Miura	Athletics	Men's 3000 m steeplechase
Gold	Horishi Waku; Kiyoshi Shimada; Hiromitsu Inomata; Yoshiharu Tomonaga	Athletics	Men's 4 × 400 m relay
Gold	Kenji Kimihara	Athletics	Men's marathon
Gold	Kyoichiro Inoue	Athletics	Men's pole vault
Gold	Shinji Ogura	Athletics	Men's long jump
Gold	Shigenobu Murofushi	Athletics	Men's hammer throw
Gold	Hisao Yamamoto	Athletics	Men's javelin throw
Gold	Junichi Onizuka	Athletics	Men's decathlon
Gold	Keiko Yamada	Athletics	Women's 200 m
Gold	Emiko Konishi; Keiko Tsuchida; Ritsuko Sato; Keiko Yamada	Athletics	Women's 4 × 100 m relay
Gold	Michiyo Inaoka	Athletics	Women's high jump
Gold	Hiroko Yamashita	Athletics	Women's long jump
Gold	Teruko Yagishita	Athletics	Women's discus throw
Gold	Nobuko Morita	Athletics	Women's javelin throw
Gold	Hiroe Yuki	Badminton	Women's singles
Gold	Etsuko Takenaka; Machiko Aizawa	Badminton	Women's doubles
Gold	Etsuko Takenaka; Mariko Nishio; Machiko Aizawa; Hiroe Yuki	Badminton	Women's team
Gold	Masato Abe; Toru Miyaichi; Takao Ono; Terue Yoshida	Cycling	Men's team time trial
Gold	Takafumi Matsuda	Cycling	Men's 1 km time trial
Gold	Kenichi Ono	Cycling	Men's individual pursuit
Gold	Tsutomu Irimagawa; Seiichi Iwasaki; Takafumi Matsuda; Shinpei Okajima	Cycling	Men's team 1600 m time trial
Gold	Tsutomu Irimagawa; Seiichi Iwasaki; Takafumi Matsuda; Shinpei Okajima	Cycling	Men's team pursuit
Gold	Takashi Kioka	Diving	Men's 3 m springboard
Gold	Kanoko Mabuchi	Diving	Women's 3 m springboard
Gold	Yoko Arimitsu	Diving	Women's 10 m platform
Gold	Kazuoki Matsuyama	Sailing	Men's OK
Gold	Takao Otani	Sailing	Men's super moth
Gold	Akira Yamamura; Takashi Yamamura	Sailing	Men's flying dutchman
Gold	Kanji Kubo; Makoto Shiraishi; Shinji Takahashi; Yoshihisa Yoshikawa	Shooting	Men's 25 m center fire pistol team
Gold	Kanji Kubo	Shooting	Men's 25 m rapid fire pistol
Gold	Takeo Kamachi; Kanji Kubo; Makoto Shiraishi; Tadamasa Yamamoto	Shooting	Men's 25 m rapid fire pistol team
Gold	Isamu Hikari	Shooting	Men's 50 m pistol
Gold	Isamu Hikari; Takeo Kamachi; Shinji Takahashi; Yoshihisa Yoshikawa	Shooting	Men's 50 m pistol team
Gold	Minoru Ito	Shooting	Men's 10 m air rifle
Gold	Minoru Ito; Hiroya Okuda; Kazuya Ono; Kenjiro Tsuba	Shooting	Men's 10 m air rifle team
Gold	Takeo Toriyama	Shooting	Men's 50 m rifle prone
Gold	Shojiro Sawa	Swimming	Men's 100 m freestyle
Gold	Kunihiro Iwasaki	Swimming	Men's 200 m freestyle
Gold	Tadashi Honda	Swimming	Men's 100 m backstroke
Gold	Tadashi Honda	Swimming	Men's 200 m backstroke
Gold	Nobutaka Taguchi	Swimming	Men's 100 m breaststroke
Gold	Nobutaka Taguchi	Swimming	Men's 200 m breaststroke
Gold	Yasuhiro Komazaki	Swimming	Men's 100 m butterfly
Gold	Yasuhiro Komazaki	Swimming	Men's 200 m butterfly
Gold	Toru Udo	Swimming	Men's 400 m individual medley
Gold	Shojiro Sawa; Kunihiro Iwasaki; Noboru Waseda; Satoshi Maruya	Swimming	Men's 4 × 100 m freestyle relay
Gold	Akira Iida; Kunihiro Iwasaki; Noboru Waseda; Toshinori Murata	Swimming	Men's 4 × 200 m freestyle relay
Gold	Tadashi Honda; Nobutaka Taguchi; Satoshi Maruya; Shojiro Sawa	Swimming	Men's 4 × 100 m medley relay
Gold	Yoshimi Nishigawa	Swimming	Women's 100 m freestyle
Gold	Yoshimi Nishigawa	Swimming	Women's 200 m freestyle
Gold	Tae Iguchi	Swimming	Women's 400 m freestyle
Gold	Yukiko Goshi	Swimming	Women's 100 m backstroke
Gold	Hitomi Tanigami	Swimming	Women's 100 m breaststroke
Gold	Chieno Shibata	Swimming	Women's 200 m breaststroke
Gold	Mayumi Aoki	Swimming	Women's 100 m butterfly
Gold	Yoshimi Nishigawa	Swimming	Women's 200 m individual medley
Gold	Shigeko Kawanishi; Yukiko Goshi; Yukari Takemoto; Yoshimi Nishigawa	Swimming	Women's 4 × 100 m freestyle relay
Gold	Shigeko Kawanishi; Yukiko Goshi; Mayumi Aoki; Chieno Shibata	Swimming	Women's 4 × 100 m medley relay
Gold	Yoshihide Fukao; Kenji Kimura; Isao Koizumi; Yasuaki Mitsumori; Jungo Morita; Yuzo Nakamura; Katsutoshi Nekoda; Keiichi Numakura; Seiji Oko; Tetsuo Sato; Kenji Shimaoka; Tadayoshi Yokota	Volleyball	Men's tournament
Gold	Toshimi Furuta; Keiko Hama; Takako Iida; Toyoko Iwahara; Hiroko Jinnouchi; Kajiko Kitajima; Machiko Kunitimo; Fumie Matsushita; Hisako Nagano; Aiko Onozawa; Takako Shirai; Eiko Sugawara	Volleyball	Women's tournament
Gold	Hiroshi Hashimoto; Tatsuo Jihira; Shigeharu Kuwabara; Hirokatsu Kuwayama; Kaoru Matsunaga; Naoto Minegishi; Koji Nakano; Hideo Nishida; Yukiharu Oshita; Toshio Takahashi; Yoshihiro Yasumi	Water polo	Men's tournament
Gold	Takeshi Horikoshi	Weightlifting	Men's flyweight
Gold	Yoshiyuki Miyake	Weightlifting	Men's featherweight
Gold	Nobuyuki Hatta	Weightlifting	Men's middleweight
Gold	Masashi Ouchi	Weightlifting	Men's light heavyweight
Gold	Hideaki Yanagida	Wrestling	Men's 57 kg
Gold	Kikuo Wada	Wrestling	Men's 68 kg
Gold	Toshitada Yoshida	Wrestling	Men's 74 kg
Gold	Tatsuo Sasaki	Wrestling	Men's 82 kg
Silver	Masahide Jinno	Athletics	Men's 200 m
Silver	Kenichi Otsuki	Athletics	Men's 10,000 m
Silver	Susumu Noro	Athletics	Men's 3000 m steeplechase
Silver	Chiaki Miyakawa; Masahide Jinno; Kiyoshi Shimada; Hiromitsu Inomata	Athletics	Men's 4 × 100 m relay
Silver	Yoshiro Mifune	Athletics	Men's marathon
Silver	Hidehiko Tomizawa	Athletics	Men's high jump
Silver	Masanori Araya	Athletics	Men's pole vault
Silver	Hiroomi Yamada	Athletics	Men's long jump
Silver	Yoshihisa Ishida	Athletics	Men's hammer throw
Silver	Nobuko Kawano	Athletics	Women's 800 m
Silver	Miyako Inoue	Athletics	Women's 1500 m
Silver	Ayako Natsume	Athletics	Women's 100 m hurdles
Silver	Keiko Yamada	Athletics	Women's 100 m
Silver	Kumie Suzuki	Athletics	Women's high jump
Silver	Satoe Matsuzaki	Athletics	Women's shot put
Silver	Yoko Saito	Athletics	Women's discus throw
Silver	Sakiko Hara	Athletics	Women's javelin throw
Silver	Junji Honma; Shoichi Toganoo	Badminton	Men's doubles
Silver	Miyoji Tateyama	Boxing	Men's 51 kg
Silver	Tomiharu Tonosaki	Boxing	Men's 60 kg
Silver	Masato Abe	Cycling	Men's road race
Silver	Toshio Otsubo	Diving	Men's 10 m platform
Silver	Yoko Arimitsu	Diving	Women's 3 m springboard
Silver	Makoto Shiraishi	Shooting	Men's 25 m center fire pistol
Silver	Kunihiro Iwasaki	Swimming	Men's 100 m freestyle
Silver	Noboru Waseda	Swimming	Men's 200 m freestyle
Silver	Akira Iida	Swimming	Men's 400 m freestyle
Silver	Akira Iida	Swimming	Men's 1500 m freestyle
Silver	Koji Hoshino	Swimming	Men's 100 m backstroke
Silver	Koji Hoshino	Swimming	Men's 200 m backstroke
Silver	Satoshi Maruya	Swimming	Men's 100 m butterfly
Silver	Satoshi Maruya	Swimming	Men's 200 m butterfly
Silver	Junhachiro Tsutsumi	Swimming	Men's 400 m individual medley
Silver	Shigeko Kawanishi	Swimming	Women's 100 m freestyle
Silver	Shigeko Kawanishi	Swimming	Women's 200 m freestyle
Silver	Kikuyo Ishii	Swimming	Women's 100 m backstroke
Silver	Chieno Shibata	Swimming	Women's 100 m breaststroke
Silver	Hitomi Tanigami	Swimming	Women's 200 m breaststroke
Silver	Kazuyo Banno	Swimming	Women's 100 m butterfly
Silver	Yukari Takemoto	Swimming	Women's 200 m individual medley
Silver	Kenkichi Ando	Weightlifting	Men's bantamweight
Silver	Hideki Fujimoto	Weightlifting	Men's middle heavyweight
Silver	Yoshiyuki Matsuhashi	Wrestling	Men's 48 kg
Silver	Kiyomi Kato	Wrestling	Men's 52 kg
Silver	Kiyoshi Abe	Wrestling	Men's 62 kg
Silver	Shizuo Yada	Wrestling	Men's 100 kg
Silver	Yorihide Isogai	Wrestling	Men's +100 kg
Bronze	Yoshitake Tsuchiya	Athletics	Men's 800 m
Bronze	Masazumi Aoki	Athletics	Men's shot put
Bronze	Toji Hayashi	Athletics	Men's discus throw
Bronze	Nobuko Kawano	Athletics	Women's 400 m
Bronze	Keiko Tsuchida	Athletics	Women's long jump
Bronze	Yoko Saito	Athletics	Women's shot put
Bronze	Ippei Kojima	Badminton	Men's singles
Bronze	Junji Honma; Ippei Kojima; Hiroshi Taniguchi; Shoichi Toganoo	Badminton	Men's team
Bronze	Ippei Kojima; Etsuko Takenaka	Badminton	Mixed doubles
Bronze	Shigeaki Abe; Yoshikuni Awano; Seiji Igarashi; Isao Kimura; Akira Kodama; Satoshi Mori; Fumihiko Moroyama; Kazufumi Sakai; Kenji Soda; Atsushi Somatomo; Masatomo Taniguchi; Kunihiko Yokoyama	Basketball	Men's tournament
Bronze	Yoshimitsu Aragaki	Boxing	Men's 48 kg
Bronze	Yasutsune Uehara	Boxing	Men's 63.5 kg
Bronze	Yoshitsugu Kawabe	Boxing	Men's 67 kg
Bronze	Masato Abe; Toru Miyaichi; Takao Ono; Terue Yoshida	Cycling	Men's team road race
Bronze	Toshiaki Hayashi	Diving	Men's 10 m platform
Bronze	Saburo Amemiya; Susumu Chiba; Masaji Fuji; Shunji Furuta; Toshiaki Ichinose; Kazuo Kawamura; Kyoichi Nagaya; Hideji Okabe; Satokazu Otsuka; Haruo Satake; Norio Takahashi; Michinori Ueda; Akihito Wada	Field hockey	Men's tournament
Bronze	Minoru Ito; Hiroya Okuda; Kazuya Ono; Takeo Toriyama	Shooting	Men's 50 m rifle prone team
Bronze	Minoru Ito; Hiroya Okuda; Kazuya Ono; Kenjiro Tsuba	Shooting	Men's 50 m rifle three positions team
Bronze	Kazuya Ono	Shooting	Men's 50 m rifle three positions
Bronze	Toshinori Murata	Swimming	Men's 400 m freestyle
Bronze	Toshinori Murata	Swimming	Men's 1500 m freestyle
Bronze	Eiko Goshi	Swimming	Women's 400 m freestyle
Bronze	Koichi Tani	Wrestling	Men's 90 kg

Medals by sport
Sport	1st place, gold medalist(s)	2nd place, silver medalist(s)	3rd place, bronze medalist(s)	Total
Swimming	22	16	3	41
Athletics	19	17	6	42
Shooting	8	1	3	12
Cycling	5	1	1	7
Wrestling	4	5	1	10
Weightlifting	4	2	0	6
Diving	3	2	1	6
Badminton	3	1	3	7
Sailing	3	0	0	3
Volleyball	2	0	0	2
Water polo	1	0	0	1
Boxing	0	2	3	5
Basketball	0	0	1	1
Field hockey	0	0	1	1
Total	74	47	23	144
