= Japan at the Asian Games =

Japanese team's successful participation at Asian Games

- IOC code: JPN
- NOC: Japanese Olympic Committee
- Medals Ranked 2nd: Gold 1,167 Silver 1,199 Bronze 1,145 Total 3,511

Summer appearances
- 1951; 1954; 1958; 1962; 1966; 1970; 1974; 1978; 1982; 1986; 1990; 1994; 1998; 2002; 2006; 2010; 2014; 2018; 2022; 2026

Winter appearances
- 1986; 1990; 1996; 1999; 2003; 2007; 2011; 2017; 2025; 2029

Japan has competed at the Asian Games since their inception in 1951, held in New Delhi, India. The National Olympic Committee of Japan, Japanese Olympic Committee, is responsible for organizing Japan's participation in the Asian Games. The Committee was established in 1911 and recognized by the International Olympic Committee in 1912; it is also the oldest Asian National Olympic Committee. Japan has a distinguished achievement among all Asian sport teams, being the only one to have won at least 20 gold medals at every Asian Games.

== Asian Games ==
*Red border color indicates tournament was held on home soil.

=== Medals by Games ===
Games	Athletes	Gold	Silver	Bronze	Total	Rank
(India) 1951 New Delhi	65	24	21	15	60	1
(Philippines) 1954 Manila	151	38	36	24	98	1
(Japan) 1958 Tokyo	287	67	41	30	138	1
(Indonesia) 1962 Jakarta	209	73	56	23	152	1
(Thailand) 1966 Bangkok	216	78	53	33	164	1
(Thailand) 1970 Bangkok	221	74	47	23	144	1
(Iran) 1974 Tehran	290	75	49	51	175	1
(Thailand) 1978 Bangkok	306	70	58	49	177	1
(India) 1982 Delhi	355	57	52	44	153	2
(South Korea) 1986 Seoul	439	58	76	77	211	3
(China) 1990 Beijing	543	38	60	76	174	3
(Japan) 1994 Hiroshima	678	64	75	79	218	2
(Thailand) 1998 Bangkok	629	52	61	68	181	3
(South Korea) 2002 Busan	658	44	74	72	190	3
(Qatar) 2006 Doha	626	50	71	77	198	3
(China) 2010 Guangzhou	726	48	74	94	216	3
(South Korea) 2014 Incheon	711	47	77	76	200	3
(Indonesia) 2018 Jakarta & Palembang	758	75	56	74	205	2
(China) 2022 Hangzhou	769	52	67	69	188	2
(Japan) 2026 Nagoya	932	83	95	91	269	2
Total (20/20)	9,572	1167	1199	1145	3511	2

=== Medals by sport ===
Sport	Rank	Gold	Silver	Bronze	Total
Archery	2	8	9	8	25
Athletics	2	194	221	171	586
Badminton	5	7	8	25	40
Baseball	3	1	3	3	7
Beach volleyball	2	1	3	3	7
Basketball	4	2	4	13	19
Bodybuilding	11	0	3	2	5
Bowling	2	18	15	7	40
Boxing	6	13	13	38	64
Bridge	8	0	0	1	1
Canoeing	4	6	14	19	39
Cricket	5	0	0	1	1
Cue sports	5	4	3	4	11
Cycling	1	53	54	27	134
Dancesport	3	0	3	4	7
Diving	2	17	21	33	71
Equestrian	1	18	12	8	38
Fencing	3	13	13	40	66
Field hockey	5	2	3	5	10
Football	5	2	5	4	11
Go	4	0	0	3	3
Golf	3	9	4	5	18
Gymnastics	2	19	33	51	103
Handball	4	0	6	6	12
Judo	1	56	37	30	123
Kabaddi	7	0	0	1	1
Karate	1	30	10	9	49
Modern pentathlon	4	0	3	4	7
Roller sports	3	4	2	0	6
Rowing	2	9	35	12	56
Rugby	1	4	5	0	9
Sailing	3	20	22	12	54
Sepaktakraw	9	0	1	10	11
Shooting	3	54	44	55	153
Soft tennis	3	7	11	14	32
Softball	1	5	3	0	8
Squash	8	0	0	1	1
Swimming	1	277	260	161	698
Synchronized swimming	2	6	10	0	16
Table tennis	2	20	18	42	80
Taekwondo	15	0	3	10	13
Tennis	1	27	18	38	83
Triathlon	1	8	5	1	14
Volleyball	1	16	5	6	27
Water polo	3	4	9	4	17
Weightlifting	4	23	19	29	71
Wrestling	2	67	50	47	164
Wushu	10	1	7	9	17
Total	2	1032	1038	986	3055

=== Medals by individual ===
Athlete	Sport	Years	Gender	Gold	Silver	Bronze	Total
Yoshimi Nishigawa	Swimming	1970–1974	F	10	0	0	10
Kosuke Kitajima	Swimming	2002–2010	M	7	1	0	8
Kunihiro Iwasaki	Swimming	1966–1970	M	7	1	0	8
Takashi Yamamoto	Swimming	1998–2006	M	7	1	0	8
Yoshiko Sato	Swimming	1954–1962	F	7	0	2	9
Ryosuke Irie	Swimming	2006–2022	M	6	10	2	18
Rikako Ikee	Swimming	2018–2022	F	6	3	0	9
Nobutaka Taguchi	Swimming	1970–1974	M	6	0	0	6
Tadashi Honda	Swimming	1970–1974	M	6	0	0	6
Kosuke Hagino	Swimming	2014–2018	M	5	3	3	11
Katsunori Fujiwara	Swimming	1986–1990	M	5	3	0	8
Reiko Miyagi	Tennis	1958–1966	F	5	3	0	8
Tsuyoshi Yanagidate	Swimming	1974–1978	M	5	2	0	7
Kengo Tagata	Bowling	1986–1998	M	5	1	1	7
Takao Ishii	Shooting	1962–1966	M	5	1	1	7
Hiroko Nagasaki	Swimming	1982–1986	F	5	1	0	6
Shigenobu Murofushi	Athletics	1966–1986	M	5	1	0	6
Keiichi Miki	Table tennis	1962–1966	M	5	0	2	7
Koji Watanabe	Tennis	1962–1966	M	5	0	0	5
Miya Tachibana	Synchronized swimming	1994–2002	F	5	0	0	5
Toyoko Yoshino	Athletics	1951–1954	F	5	0	0	5
Yasue Hatsuda	Swimming	1974–1978	F	5	0	0	5
Yoshiaki Oiwa	Equestrian	2006–2018	M	4	1	1	6

== Asian Winter Games ==
*Red border color indicates tournament was held on home soil.

=== Medals by Games ===
Games	Athlete	Gold	Silver	Bronze	Total	Rank
(Japan) 1986 Sapporo	92	29	23	6	58	1
(Japan) 1990 Sapporo	80	18	16	13	47	1
(China) 1996 Harbin	108	8	14	10	32	3
(South Korea) 1999 Gangwon	100	6	14	9	29	4
(Japan) 2003 Aomori	154	24	23	20	67	1
(China) 2007 Changchun	113	13	9	14	36	2
(Kazakhstan) 2011 Astana & Almaty	103	13	24	17	54	2
(Japan) 2017 Sapporo & Obihiro	146	27	21	26	74	1
(China) 2025 Harbin	151	10	12	15	37	3
(Kazakhstan) 2029 Almaty	Future Event					
Total		148	156	130	434	1

== East Asian Games ==
*Red border color indicates tournament was held on home soil.

=== Medals by Games ===
Games	Athlete	Gold	Silver	Bronze	Total	Rank
(China) 1993 Shanghai	253	25	37	55	117	2
(South Korea) 1997 Busan	258	47	53	53	153	2
(Japan) 2001 Osaka	327	61	65	65	191	2
2005 Macau	335	46	56	77	179	2
2009 Hong Kong	378	62	58	70	190	2
(China) 2013 Tianjin	436	47	57	75	179	2
Total		288	326	395	1009	2

== East Asian Youth Games ==
=== Medals by Games ===
Games	Athlete	Gold	Silver	Bronze	Total	Rank
(Mongolia) 2023 Ulaanbaatar	48	22	6	13	41	2
Total		22	6	13	41	2

== Asian Indoor and Martial Arts Games ==
=== Medals by Games ===
Games	Athlete	Gold	Silver	Bronze	Total	Rank
Asian Indoor Games
(Thailand) 2005 Bangkok	30	6	2	6	14	7
2007 Macau	102	8	7	11	26	7
(Vietnam) 2009 Hanoi	94	5	9	9	23	11
Asian Martial Arts Games
(Thailand) 2009 Bangkok	19	9	2	3	14	5
Asian Indoor and Martial Arts Games
(South Korea) 2013 Incheon	82	3	4	8	15	9
(Turkmenistan) 2017 Ashgabat	60	2	5	10	17	20
Total		33	29	47	109	

== Asian Beach Games ==
=== Medals by Games ===
Games	Athlete	Gold	Silver	Bronze	Total	Rank
(Indonesia) 2008 Bali	80	3	3	3	9	5
(Oman) 2010 Muscat	46	2	1	3	6	10
(China) 2012 Haiyang	85	1	3	2	6	8
(Thailand) 2014 Phuket	95	7	5	7	19	8
(Vietnam) 2016 Danang	54	1	2	7	10	25
(China) 2026 Sanya	27	0	1	2	3	20
Total		14	15	24	53	9

== Asian Youth Games ==
=== Medals by Games ===
Games	Athlete	Gold	Silver	Bronze	Total	Rank
2009 Singapore	38	5	6	4	15	6
(China) 2013 Nanjing	62	7	5	6	18	3
(Bahrain) 2025 Manama	49	4	6	8	18	16
(Uzbekistan) 2029 Tashkent	Future event					
Total		12	11	10	33	5

== Asian Para Games ==
=== Medals by Games ===
Games	Delegation	Gold	Silver	Bronze	Total	Rank
(China) 2010 Guangzhou	225	32	39	32	103	2
(South Korea) 2014 Incheon	298	38	49	56	143	3
(Indonesia) 2018 Jakarta	303	45	70	83	198	4
(China) 2022 Hangzhou	259	42	49	59	150	3
(Japan) 2026 Aichi-Nagoya	285	64	60	62	186	2
Total		221	267	292	780	2

=== Sports ===
Medals per sport

Sport Gold Silver Bronze Total

Archery 2 2 1 5

Athletics 32 44 36 112

Badminton 1 1 11 13

Blind Football 0 1 0 1

Boccia 0 1 1 2

Cycling Road 8 9 4 21

Goalball 1 1 2 4

Judo 3 8 15 26

Lawn Bowls 0 0 1 1

Para Dance Sport 0 0 1 1

Para Football 7-a-side 0 1 1 2

Para Sailing 0 1 0 1

Para Shooting 0 0 1 1

Para Tenpin Bowling 0 5 1 6

Powerlifting 0 0 2 2

Rowing 0 3 1 4

Sitting Volleyball 0 1 2 3

Swimming 54 62 67 183

Table Tennis 2 3 13 18

Wheelchair Basketball 2 4 0 6

Wheelchair Fencing 0 2 7 9

Wheelchair Rugby 1 0 0 1

Wheelchair Tennis 9 9 4 22

Total 115 158 171 444

Medals per year

Year Gold Silver Bronze Total

2018 45 70 83 198

2014 38 49 56 143

2010 32 39 32 103

Total 115 158 171 444

== Asian Youth Para Games ==
*Red border color indicates tournament was held on home soil.

=== Medals by Games ===
Games	Delegation	Gold	Silver	Bronze	Total	Rank
(Japan) 2009 Tokyo	214	65	26	22	113	1
(Malaysia) 2013 Kuala Lumpur	169	39	20	25	84	1
(United Arab Emirates) 2017 Dubai	146	43	29	26	98	1
(Bahrain) 2021 Manama	85	30	11	14	55	3
Total		177	86	87	350	1

== See also ==
- Japan at the Olympics
