= Philippines at the 1970 Asian Games =

- IOC code: PHI
- NOC: Philippine Olympic Committee
- Website: www.olympic.ph (in English)

in Bangkok
- Medals Ranked 11th: Gold 1 Silver 9 Bronze 12 Total 22

Asian Games appearances (overview)
- 1951; 1954; 1958; 1962; 1966; 1970; 1974; 1978; 1982; 1986; 1990; 1994; 1998; 2002; 2006; 2010; 2014; 2018; 2022; 2026

The Philippines participated in the 1970 Asian Games held in Bangkok, Thailand from August 24 to September 4, 1970. Ranked 11th with 1 gold medal, 9 silver medals and 12 bronze medals with a total of 22 over-all medals.

== Asian Games performance ==
A win by bantamweight boxer Ricardo Fortaleza was the lone gold medal for the 76-man contingent that competed in eight sports.

== Medalists ==
The following Philippine competitors won medals at the Games.

=== Gold ===
No.	Medal	Name	Sport	Event
1	Gold	Ricardo Fortaleza	Boxing	Bantamweight 54kg

=== Silver ===
No.	Medal	Name	Sport	Event
1	Silver	Amelita Alanes	Athletics	Women's 200m
2	Silver	Manolo Vicera	Boxing	Light flyweight 48kg
3	Silver	Rolando Guaves	Cycling	Track 4800m Mass Start
4	Silver	Amman Jalmaani	Swimming	Men's 100m Breaststroke
5	Silver	Amman Jalmaani	Swimming	Men's 200m Breaststroke
6	Silver	Dae Imlani; Carlos Brosas; Kemalpasa Umih; Jairulla Jaitulla	Swimming	Men's 4x100m Freestyle Relay
7	Silver	Dae Imlani; Leroy Goff; Kemalpasa Umih; Jairulla Jaitulla	Swimming	Men's 4x200m Freestyle Relay
8	Silver	Ibnorajik Muksan; Amman Jalmaani; Leroy Goff; Jairulla Jaitulla	Swimming	Men's 4x100m Medley Relay
9	Silver	Salvador del Rosario	Weightlifting	Flyweight 52kg

=== Bronze ===
No.	Medal	Name	Sport	Event
1	Bronze	Isabel Cruz	Athletics	Women's 800m
2	Bronze	Lolita Lagrosas	Athletics	Women's High Jump
3	Bronze	Lolita Lagrosas	Athletics	Women's Pentathlon
4	Bronze	Nemesio Gonzaga	Boxing	Featherweight 57kg
5	Bronze	Eugenio Valmocina	Boxing	Light welterweight 63.5kg
6	Bronze	Nicolas Aquilino	Boxing	Light middleweight 75kg
7	Bronze	Rolando Guaves	Cycling	Track 800m Mass Start
8	Bronze	Roberto Querimit	Cycling	Track 1600m Mass Start
9	Bronze	Jairulla Jaitulla	Swimming	Men's 200m Freestyle
10	Bronze	Kemalpasa Umih	Swimming	Men's 200m Breaststroke
11	Bronze	Leroy Goff	Swimming	Men's 200m Butterfly
12	Bronze	Luz Arzaga; Hedy Garcia; Susan Papa; Luz Laciste	Swimming	Women's 4x100m Medley Relay

=== Multiple ===
Name	Sport	Gold	Silver	Bronze	Total
Jairulla Jaitulla	Swimming	0	3	1	4
Amman Jalmaani	Swimming	0	3	0	3
Kemalpasa Umih	Swimming	0	2	1	3
Leroy Goff	Swimming	0	2	1	3
Dae Imlani	Swimming	0	2	0	2
Rolando guaves	Cycling	0	1	1	2
Lolita Lagrosas	Athletics	0	0	2	2

== Medal summary ==
=== Medals by sports ===
Sport	Gold	Silver	Bronze	Total
Boxing	1	1	3	5
Swimming	0	5	4	9
Athletics	0	1	3	4
Cycling	0	1	2	3
Weightlifting	0	1	0	1
Totals (5 entries)	1	9	12	22
