= Maruya =

Maruya may refer to:

== People ==
- Saiichi Maruya (丸谷 才一), Japanese author and literary critic
- Kaori Maruya (丸谷 佳織), Japanese politician
- Satoshi Maruya (丸谷 里志, born 1947), Japanese swimmer

== Other uses ==
- Maruya (Philippine cuisine), banana fritters from the Philippines
