= Swimming at the 1970 Asian Games =

- Venue: Visutdrarom Swimming Pool
- Dates: 12–16 December 1970

Swimming was contested at the 1970 Asian Games in National Stadium, Bangkok, Thailand from December 12 to December 16, 1970.

== Medalists ==
=== Men ===
| Event | Gold | | Silver | | Bronze | |
|---|---|---|---|---|---|---|
| 100 m freestyle | Shojiro Sawa; Japan | 55.3; GR | Kunihiro Iwasaki; Japan | 56.1 | Tan Thuan Heng; Singapore | 56.4 |
| 200 m freestyle | Kunihiro Iwasaki; Japan | 2:01.5 | Noboru Waseda; Japan | 2:01.9 | Jairulla Jaitulla; Philippines | 2:03.3 |
| 400 m freestyle | Cho Oh-ryun; South Korea | 4:20.2; GR | Akira Iida; Japan | 4:21.2 | Toshinori Murata; Japan | 4:26.3 |
| 1500 m freestyle | Cho Oh-ryun; South Korea | 17:25.7; GR | Akira Iida; Japan | 17:42.7 | Toshinori Murata; Japan | 17:45.9 |
| 100 m backstroke | Tadashi Honda; Japan | 1:01.2; GR | Koji Hoshino; Japan | 1:02.4 | Hsu Tung-hsiung; Republic of China | 1:03.7 |
| 200 m backstroke | Tadashi Honda; Japan | 2:13.2; GR | Koji Hoshino; Japan | 2:17.6 | Hsu Tung-hsiung; Republic of China | 2:18.6 |
| 100 m breaststroke | Nobutaka Taguchi; Japan | 1:06.3; GR | Amman Jalmaani; Philippines | 1:09.9 | Phath Sim Onn; Khmer Republic | 1:10.8 |
| 200 m breaststroke | Nobutaka Taguchi; Japan | 2:28.2; GR | Amman Jalmaani; Philippines | 2:34.0 | Kemalpasa Umih; Philippines | 2:35.5 |
| 100 m butterfly | Yasuhiro Komazaki; Japan | 58.7; GR | Satoshi Maruya; Japan | 58.8 | Hsu Tung-hsiung; Republic of China | 1:01.2 |
| 200 m butterfly | Yasuhiro Komazaki; Japan | 2:09.0; GR | Satoshi Maruya; Japan | 2:16.0 | Leroy Goff; Philippines | 2:16.3 |
| 400 m individual medley | Toru Udo; Japan | 4:57.8; GR | Junhachiro Tsutsumi; Japan | 5:02.8 | Hsu Tung-hsiung; Republic of China | 5:05.8 |
| 4 × 100 m freestyle relay | Japan; Shojiro Sawa; Kunihiro Iwasaki; Noboru Waseda; Satoshi Maruya | 3:41.9; GR | Philippines; Dae Imlani; Carlos Brosas; Kemalpasa Umih; Jairulla Jaitulla | 3:52.0 | Khmer Republic; Eat Kim Heng; Tieng Sok; Prak Samnang; Tan Bunthay | 3:52.1 |
| 4 × 200 m freestyle relay | Japan; Noboru Waseda; Kunihiro Iwasaki; Akira Iida; Toshinori Murata | 8:14.9; GR | Philippines; Jairulla Jaitulla; Dae Imlani; Kemalpasa Umih; Leroy Goff | 8:35.8 | Singapore; Alex Chan; Soh Seng Hoi; Roy Chan; Tan Thuan Heng | 8:35.8 |
| 4 × 100 m medley relay | Japan; Tadashi Honda; Nobutaka Taguchi; Satoshi Maruya; Shojiro Sawa | 4:00.4; GR | Philippines; Ibnorajik Muksan; Amman Jalmaani; Leroy Goff; Jairulla Jaitulla | 4:15.3 | Israel; Yoav Yaakovi; Yohan Kende; Dan Stern; Moshe Gertel | 4:18.1 |

=== Women ===
| Event | Gold | | Silver | | Bronze | |
|---|---|---|---|---|---|---|
| 100 m freestyle | Yoshimi Nishigawa; Japan | 1:01.0; GR | Shigeko Kawanishi; Japan | 1:01.5 | Pat Chan; Singapore | 1:03.4 |
| 200 m freestyle | Yoshimi Nishigawa; Japan | 2:13.8; GR | Shigeko Kawanishi; Japan | 2:17.3 | Pat Chan; Singapore | 2:19.0 |
| 400 m freestyle | Tae Iguchi; Japan | 4:51.8; GR | Pat Chan; Singapore | 4:52.4 | Eiko Goshi; Japan | 5:03.7 |
| 100 m backstroke | Yukiko Goshi; Japan | 1:08.4; GR | Kikuyo Ishii; Japan | 1:08.6 | Pat Chan; Singapore | 1:11.1 |
| 100 m breaststroke | Hitomi Tanigami; Japan | 1:18.9; GR | Chieno Shibata; Japan | 1:19.8 | Shlomit Nir; Israel | 1:20.6 |
| 200 m breaststroke | Chieno Shibata; Japan | 2:46.5; GR | Hitomi Tanigami; Japan | 2:51.5 | Shlomit Nir; Israel | 2:54.3 |
| 100 m butterfly | Mayumi Aoki; Japan | 1:05.9; GR | Kazuyo Banno; Japan | 1:08.4 | Tay Chin Joo; Singapore | 1:08.9 |
| 200 m individual medley | Yoshimi Nishigawa; Japan | 2:26.5; GR | Yukari Takemoto; Japan | 2:30.5 | Pat Chan; Singapore | 2:35.9 |
| 4 × 100 m freestyle relay | Japan; Shigeko Kawanishi; Yukiko Goshi; Yukari Takemoto; Yoshimi Nishigawa | 4:12.5; GR | Singapore; Elaine Sng; Jovina Tseng; Tay Chin Joo; Pat Chan | 4:20.4 | Republic of China; Shen Bao-ni; Wang Dai-yu; Hsu Yue-yun; Shen Pei-ni | 4:35.7 |
| 4 × 100 m medley relay | Japan; Yukiko Goshi; Mayumi Aoki; Chieno Shibata; Yoshimi Nishigawa | 4:35.4; GR | Singapore; Pat Chan; Tay Chin Joo; Esther Tan; Elaine Sng | 4:55.8 | Philippines; Luz Arzaga; Hedy Garcia; Susan Papa; Luz Laciste | 5:08.5 |

== Medal table ==
| Rank | Nation | Gold | Silver | Bronze | Total |
|---|---|---|---|---|---|
| 1 | Japan (JPN) | 22 | 16 | 3 | 41 |
| 2 | South Korea (KOR) | 2 | 0 | 0 | 2 |
| 3 | Philippines (PHI) | 0 | 5 | 4 | 9 |
| 4 | Singapore (SIN) | 0 | 3 | 7 | 10 |
| 5 | Republic of China (ROC) | 0 | 0 | 5 | 5 |
| 6 | Israel (ISR) | 0 | 0 | 3 | 3 |
| 7 | Khmer Republic (KHM) | 0 | 0 | 2 | 2 |
| Totals (7 entries) | | 24 | 24 | 24 | 72 |
