= Hsu Tung-hsiung =

Taiwanese swimmer

Personal information
- Born: 20 December 1954 (age 71) Taitung County, Taiwan

Sport
- Sport: Swimming
Medal record
Representing Republic of China
Asian Games
Bronze medal – third place	1970 Bangkok	100m backstroke
Bronze medal – third place	1970 Bangkok	200m backstroke
Bronze medal – third place	1970 Bangkok	100m butterfly
Bronze medal – third place	1970 Bangkok	400m individual medley

Hsu Tung-hsiung
- Traditional Chinese: 許東雄
- Hanyu Pinyin: Xǔ Dōngxióng

Hsu Tung-hsiung (born 20 December 1954) is a Taiwanese sports official and former swimmer. He won bronze medals in four events at the 1970 Asian Games, and competed in four events at the 1972 Summer Olympics.

Hsu was born in Taitung, and moved to Kaohsiung at the age of 12. Nicknamed "the iron man of swimming", as late as the 1980s he held thirteen national records in swimming. He later became the Dean of Student Affairs at Taipei Physical Education College, and in 2006 began pursuing PhD at Soochow University in mainland China. He was elected president of the Chinese Taipei Swimming Association in May 2011. He is the father of Hsu Chi-chieh, who also became an Olympic swimmer for Taiwan.
