= Wang Dali =

Chinese swimmer (born 1968)

Personal information
- Born: January 27, 1968 (age 58)

Sport
- Sport: Swimming
Medal record
Representing China
Asian Games
Gold medal – first place	1986 Seoul	1500m freestyle
Gold medal – first place	1990 Beijing	4x100m freestyle relay
Silver medal – second place	1986 Seoul	4x200m freestyle relay
Silver medal – second place	1990 Beijing	4x200m freestyle relay
Bronze medal – third place	1986 Seoul	400m freestyle
Bronze medal – third place	1990 Beijing	200m freestyle

Wang Dali (Chinese: 王大力; pinyin: Wáng Dàlì; born 27 January 1968) is a Chinese former swimmer who competed in the 1988 Summer Olympics.
