= Kenji Ikeda =

Japanese swimmer (born 1960)

Personal information
- Nationality: Japan
- Born: 1960 (age 65–66) Japan
- Height: 1.81 m (5 ft 11 in)
- Weight: 74 kg (163 lb)

Sport
- Sport: Swimming
- Strokes: Backstroke
Medal record
Men's swimming
Representing Japan
Asian Games
Gold medal – first place	1978 Bangkok	100 m backstroke
Gold medal – first place	1978 Bangkok	4×100m medley relay
Bronze medal – third place	1978 Bangkok	200m backstroke
Gold medal – first place	1982 New Delhi	100 m backstroke
Gold medal – first place	1982 New Delhi	4×100m medley relay

Kenji Ikeda (池田健二, Ikeda Kenji) (born 1960) is a retired backstroke swimmer from Japan. He represented his native country at two consecutive Asian Games, in 1978 and 1982 where he won a total of four gold medals and a bronze one. He is best known for breaking a record at a 100m backstroke competition from the 1978 Asian Games while only 18 years of age. He became the first athlete in Asia to break the 1-minute mark in the men's 100-meter backstroke, timing 59.91 to take the gold medal for Japan. He held the record until 1983.
