= Hsu Yue-yun =

Taiwanese swimmer

Personal information
- Full name: 許 玉雲, Pinyin: Xǔ Yù-yún
- Born: 20 September 1957 (age 68)

Sport
- Sport: Swimming
Medal record
Representing Republic of China
Asian Games
| Bronze medal – third place | 1970 Bangkok | 4x100m freestyle relay |

Hsu Yue-yun (born 20 September 1957) is a Taiwanese former freestyle, butterfly and medley swimmer. She competed in seven events at the 1972 Summer Olympics.
