= Shigeko Kawanishi =

Japanese swimmer (born 1948)

Personal information
- Born: 5 December 1948 (age 77) Nara, Japan

Sport
- Sport: Swimming
Medal record
Representing Japan
Asian Games
Gold medal – first place	1970 Bangkok	4x100m freestyle relay
Silver medal – second place	1970 Bangkok	100m freestyle
Silver medal – second place	1970 Bangkok	200m freestyle

Shigeko Kawanishi (川西 繁子, Kawanishi Shigeko; born 5 December 1948) is a Japanese former swimmer. She competed at the 1968 Summer Olympics and the 1972 Summer Olympics.
