= Yasuhiro Komazaki =

Japanese swimmer (born 1953)

Personal information
- Born: 28 October 1953 (age 72)

Sport
- Sport: Swimming
Medal record
Representing Japan
Asian Games
Gold medal – first place	1970 Bangkok	100m butterfly
Gold medal – first place	1970 Bangkok	200m butterfly
Gold medal – first place	1974 Tehran	200m butterfly
Bronze medal – third place	1974 Tehran	100m butterfly

Yasuhiro Komazaki (駒崎 康弘, Komazaki Yasuhiro; born 28 October 1953) is a Japanese former butterfly swimmer. He competed in three events at the 1972 Summer Olympics.
