= Noboru Waseda =

Japanese swimmer (born 1951)

Personal information
- Born: 23 July 1951 (age 75) Hiroshima, Japan

Sport
- Sport: Swimming
- Strokes: freestyle
Medal record
Representing Japan
Asian Games
Gold medal – first place	1970 Bangkok	4x100m freestyle relay
Gold medal – first place	1970 Bangkok	4x200m freestyle relay
Silver medal – second place	1970 Bangkok	200m freestyle

Noboru Waseda (Japanese: 早稲田 昇, Hepburn: Waseda Noboru; born 23 July 1951) is a Japanese former swimmer. He competed in two events at the 1968 Summer Olympics.
