= Kikuyo Ishii =

Japanese swimmer (born 1954)

Personal information
- Full name: 石井菊代 Ishii Kikuyo
- Born: 2 April 1954 (age 72)

Sport
- Sport: Swimming
- Strokes: backstroke
Medal record
Representing Japan
Asian Games
Silver medal – second place	1970 Bangkok	100m backstroke

Kikuyo Ishii (石井 菊代, Ishii Kikuyo; born 2 April 1954) is a Japanese former backstroke swimmer. She competed in two events at the 1972 Summer Olympics.
