= Yukari Takemoto =

Japanese swimmer (born 1955)

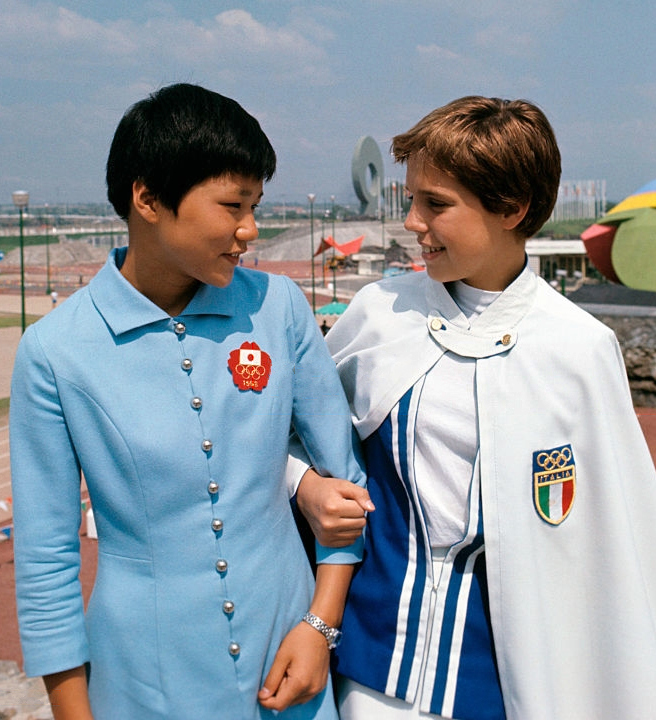
- Yukari Takemoto and Novella Calligaris at the 1968 Olympics, both are 13

Personal information
- Born: 27 April 1955 (age 71) Hiroshima Prefecture, Japan
- Height: 1.63 m (5 ft 4 in)
- Weight: 55 kg (121 lb)

Sport
- Sport: Swimming
Medal record
Representing Japan
Asian Games
Gold medal – first place	1970 Bangkok	4×100 m freestyle
Silver medal – second place	1970 Bangkok	200 m medley
Silver medal – second place	1974 Tehran	200 m medley
Silver medal – second place	1974 Tehran	100 m butterfly

Yukari Takemoto (竹本 ゆかり, Takemoto Yukari; born 27 April 1955) is a retired Japanese swimmer. She had just turned 13 when she qualified for the 1968 Olympics, where she competed in the 100 m and 200 m breaststroke. At her next Olympics in 1972 she took part in the 4 × 100 m freestyle and 200 m and 400 m medley events, but was also eliminated in the preliminaries.
