= Yukiko Goshi =

Japanese swimmer (born 1951)

Personal information
- Born: 19 April 1951 (age 75) Kumamoto, Japan

Sport
- Sport: Swimming
- Strokes: backstroke
Medal record
Representing Japan
Asian Games
Gold medal – first place	1970 Bangkok	100m backstroke
Gold medal – first place	1970 Bangkok	4x100m freestyle relay
Gold medal – first place	1970 Bangkok	4x100m medley relay

Yukiko Goshi (合志 幸子, Gōshi Yukiko; born 19 April 1951) is a Japanese former backstroke swimmer. She competed in two events at the 1968 Summer Olympics.
