= Carlos Brosas =

Filipino swimmer (1955–2024)

Personal information
- Full name: Carlos Singson Brosas
- Nickname: Pinky
- Nationality: Filipino
- Born: December 19, 1955
- Died: October 3, 2024 (aged 68)

Sport
- Sport: Swimming
Medal record
Representing Philippines
Asian Games
| Silver medal – second place | 1970 Bangkok | 4×100m freestyle relay |

Carlos "Pinky" Singson Brosas (December 19, 1955 – October 3, 2024) was a Filipino swimmer.

== Career ==
=== Competitive ===
At the age of 14, Brosas won a silver medal in the 4 × 100-metre freestyle relay along with Dae Imlani, Kemalpasa Umih, and Jairulla Jaitulla at the 1970 Asian Games in Bangkok, Thailand. He competed in five events at the 1972 Summer Olympics in Munich, West Germany.

=== Coaching ===
He later became head coach of the Philippine Olympic swimming team during the 1988, 2008, and 2012 Summer Olympics. During this time, Brosas mentored multiple Filipino Olympic swimmers including Jessie Lacuna, Eric Buhain, Akiko Thomson, and Miguel Molina. Brosas was credited with at least 37 Philippine Open records.

He was also the coach of Filipino swimmers who took part at the 2010 Summer Youth Olympics.

== Death ==
Brosas died in October 3, 2024, at the age of 68.
