= Chieno Shibata =

Japanese swimmer (born 1953)

Personal information
- Born: 30 November 1953 (age 72) Shizuoka, Japan

Sport
- Sport: Swimming
Medal record
Representing Japan
Asian Games
Gold medal – first place	1970 Bangkok	200m breaststroke
Gold medal – first place	1970 Bangkok	4x100m medley relay
Silver medal – second place	1970 Bangkok	100m breaststroke

Chieno Shibata (柴田 智恵野, Shibata Chieno; born 30 November 1953) is a Japanese former swimmer. She competed at the 1968 Summer Olympics and the 1972 Summer Olympics.
