= Eiko Goshi =

Japanese swimmer (born 1954)

Personal information
- Born: 25 April 1954 (age 72)

Sport
- Sport: Swimming
- Strokes: freestyle
Medal record
Women's swimming
Representing Japan
Asian Games
Bronze medal – third place	1970 Bangkok	400 m freestyle

Eiko Goshi (合志 えい子, Gōshi Eiko; born 25 April 1954) is a Japanese former freestyle swimmer. She competed in the women's 4 × 100 metre freestyle relay at the 1972 Summer Olympics.
