= Hedy Garcia =

Filipino swimmer (born 1950)

Hedy García
Personal information
- Full name: Hedvig García
- Born: 8 February 1950 (age 76) Paxil Lag, Philippines

Sport
- Sport: Swimming
Medal record
Representing Philippines
Asian Games
Silver medal – second place	1966 Bangkok	4x100m medley relay
Bronze medal – third place	1970 Bangkok	4x100m medley relay

Hedy García (born 8 February 1950) is a Filipino former swimmer. She competed in four events at the 1968 Summer Olympics.
