= Amman Jalmaani =

Filipino swimmer (1948–2021)

Personal information
- Full name: Ammante Jalmaani
- Born: December 15, 1948 Jolo, Philippines
- Died: November 23, 2021 (aged 72) Zamboanga City, Philippines

Sport
- Sport: Swimming
Medal record
Men's swimming
Representing Philippines
Asian Games
Silver medal – second place	1970 Bangkok	100 m breastroke
Silver medal – second place	1970 Bangkok	200 m breastroke
Silver medal – second place	1970 Bangkok	4 x 100 m medley relay
Bronze medal – third place	1966 Bangkok	100 m breastroke
Bronze medal – third place	1966 Bangkok	4 x 100 m medley relay
Bronze medal – third place	1974 Tehran	4 x 100 m medley relay

Amman Jalmaani (December 15, 1948 – November 23, 2021) was a Filipino swimmer who competed in the Summer Olympics and the Asian Games.

== Career ==
Jalmaani competed at the 1964, 1968 and the 1972 Summer Olympics. He also participated at the 1966 Asian Games where he won two bronze medals, and the 1970 Asian Games, winning three silver medals. His last major competition was the 1974 Asian Games in Tehran where he clinched a bronze medal.

== Later life and death ==
After his retirement, Jalmaani resided in Zamboanga City and served in the Armed Forces of the Philippines. He died in Zamboanga City on November 23, 2021.
