= Leroy Goff =

Filipino swimmer (born 1946)

Personal information
- Born: 19 June 1946 (age 80) Jolo, Sulu, Philippines

Sport
- Sport: Swimming
Medal record
Representing Philippines
Asian Games
Silver medal – second place	1966 Bangkok	4x200m freestyle relay
Silver medal – second place	1970 Bangkok	4x200m freestyle relay
Silver medal – second place	1970 Bangkok	4x100m medley relay
Bronze medal – third place	1966 Bangkok	200m butterfly
Bronze medal – third place	1966 Bangkok	4x100m medley relay
Bronze medal – third place	1970 Bangkok	200m butterfly

Leroy Goff (born 19 June 1946) is a Filipino former swimmer. He competed in five events at the 1968 Summer Olympics.
