= Kunihiro Iwasaki =

Japanese swimmer (born 1944)

Personal information
- National team: Japan
- Born: 5 October 1944 (age 81)

Sport
- Sport: Swimming
- Strokes: Freestyle
Medal record
Men's swimming
Representing Japan
Olympic Games
Bronze medal – third place	1964 Tokyo	4×200 m freestyle
Asian Games
Gold medal – first place	1966 Bangkok	100 m freestyle
Gold medal – first place	1966 Bangkok	200 m freestyle
Gold medal – first place	1966 Bangkok	4×200 m freestyle
Gold medal – first place	1966 Bangkok	4×100 m medley
Gold medal – first place	1970 Bangkok	200 m freestyle
Gold medal – first place	1970 Bangkok	4×100 m freestyle
Gold medal – first place	1970 Bangkok	4×200 m freestyle
Silver medal – second place	1970 Bangkok	100 m freestyle

Kunihiro Iwasaki (岩崎 邦宏, Iwasaki Kunihiro) (born 1944) is a Japanese swimmer and Olympic medalist. He competed at the 1964 Summer Olympics in Tokyo, winning a bronze medal in 4 x 200 metre freestyle relay. He also participated at the 1968 Summer Olympics.
