= Satoshi Maruya =

Japanese swimmer (born 1947)

Personal information
- Born: 6 April 1947 (age 79) Saitama, Japan

Sport
- Sport: Swimming
Medal record
Representing Japan
Asian Games
| Gold medal – first place | 1970 Bangkok | 4x100m freestyle relay |
| Gold medal – first place | 1970 Bangkok | 4x100m medley relay |
| Silver medal – second place | 1970 Bangkok | 100m butterfly |
| Silver medal – second place | 1970 Bangkok | 200m butterfly |

Satoshi Maruya (丸谷 里志, Maruya Satoshi; born 6 April 1947) is a Japanese former butterfly swimmer. He competed in three events at the 1968 Summer Olympics.
