= Tadashi Honda =

Japanese swimmer (born 1951)

Personal information
- Born: September 19, 1951 (age 74)

Sport
- Sport: Swimming
- Strokes: Backstroke
Medal record
Representing Japan
Asian Games
Gold medal – first place	1970 Bangkok	100m backstroke
Gold medal – first place	1970 Bangkok	200m backstroke
Gold medal – first place	1970 Bangkok	4x100m medley relay
Gold medal – first place	1974 Tehran	100m backstroke
Gold medal – first place	1974 Tehran	200m backstroke
Gold medal – first place	1974 Tehran	4x100m medley relay

Tadashi Honda (本多 忠, Honda Tadashi; born 19 September 1951) is a Japanese former backstroke swimmer who competed in the 1972 Summer Olympics and in the 1976 Summer Olympics.
