= Yoshimi Nishigawa =

Japanese swimmer (born 1953)

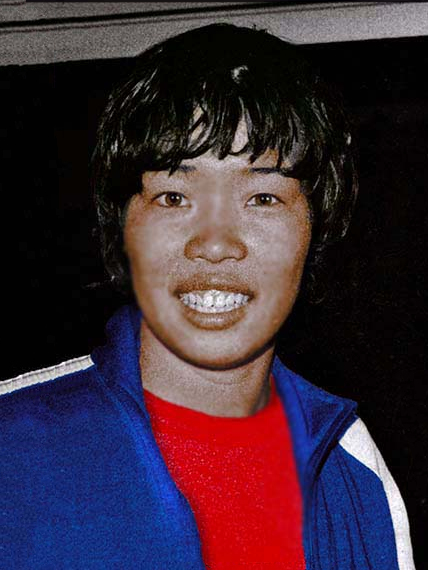
- Nishigawa at the 1974 Asian Games

Personal information
- Born: April 8, 1953 (age 73) Ibaraki, Osaka, Japan
- Height: 171 cm (5 ft 7 in)
- Weight: 64 kg (141 lb)

Sport
- Sport: Swimming
- Strokes: Freestyle, backstroke, breaststroke, medley
Medal record
Representing Japan
Asian Games
Gold medal – first place	1970 Bangkok	100 m freestyle
Gold medal – first place	1970 Bangkok	200 m freestyle
Gold medal – first place	1970 Bangkok	200 m medley
Gold medal – first place	1970 Bangkok	4×100 m freestyle
Gold medal – first place	1970 Bangkok	4×100 m medley
Gold medal – first place	1974 Tehran	100 m freestyle
Gold medal – first place	1974 Tehran	200 m freestyle
Gold medal – first place	1974 Tehran	200 m medley
Gold medal – first place	1974 Tehran	4×100 m freestyle
Gold medal – first place	1974 Tehran	4×100 m medley

Yoshimi Nishigawa (西側よしみ, born April 8, 1953) is a retired Japanese swimmer who won ten gold medals at the Asian Games in 1970 and 1974. A versatile swimmer, she competed at the 1968, 1972 and 1976 Olympics in three events at each games and reached the final on five occasions. She married the Olympic rower Takashi Murayama.
