= Swimming at the 1974 Asian Games =

- Venue: Aryamehr Swimming Pool
- Dates: 2–7 September 1974

Swimming was contested at the 1974 Asian Games in Aryamehr Swimming Pool, Tehran, Iran from September 2 to September 7, 1974.

== Medalists ==
=== Men ===
Event	Gold		Silver		Bronze	
100 m freestyle	Dan Brener; Israel	55.56	Lin Senlin; China	55.91	Akira Iida; Japan	56.31
200 m freestyle	Yukio Horiuchi; Japan	2:01.68	Cho Oh-ryun; South Korea	2:01.97	Dan Brener; Israel	2:02.61
400 m freestyle	Cho Oh-ryun; South Korea	4:17.93; GR	Shuji Ono; Japan	4:21.67	Kaname Sakamoto; Japan	4:23.84
1500 m freestyle	Cho Oh-ryun; South Korea	17:18.72; GR	Shuji Ono; Japan	17:28.60	Edwin Borja; Philippines	17:41.81
100 m backstroke	Tadashi Honda; Japan	1:01.19; GR	Gerardo Rosario; Philippines	1:03.04	Toshimitsu Yamamoto; Japan	1:03.76
200 m backstroke	Tadashi Honda; Japan	2:15.34	Gerardo Rosario; Philippines	2:15.87	Toshimitsu Yamamoto; Japan	2:18.39
100 m breaststroke	Nobutaka Taguchi; Japan	1:06.49	Lu Huankai; China	1:09.00	Kenichi Ueda; Japan	1:10.18
200 m breaststroke	Nobutaka Taguchi; Japan	2:30.06	Ding Youcai; China	2:33.08	Kenichi Ueda; Japan	2:35.22
100 m butterfly	Hideaki Hara; Japan	58.21; GR	Luo Zhaoying; China	58.44	Yasuhiro Komazaki; Japan	58.81
200 m butterfly	Yasuhiro Komazaki; Japan	2:08.14; GR	Hideaki Hara; Japan	2:08.83	Luo Zhaoying; China	2:12.31
200 m individual medley	Jiro Sasaki; Japan	2:14.41; GR	Tsuyoshi Yanagidate; Japan	2:15.31	Jairulla Jaitulla; Philippines	2:15.32
400 m individual medley	Tsuyoshi Yanagidate; Japan	4:49.41; GR	Jiro Sasaki; Japan	4:50.62	Luo Zhaoying; China	4:59.07
4 × 100 m freestyle relay	Japan; Shinya Izumi; Yukio Horiuchi; Jiro Sasaki; Akira Iida	3:43.13	China	3:44.96	Philippines; Dae Imlani; Edwin Borja; Gerardo Rosario; Sukarno Maut	3:50.91
4 × 200 m freestyle relay	Japan; Shunji Nakanishi; Yukio Horiuchi; Akira Iida; Kaname Sakamoto	8:16.05	China	8:28.29	Philippines; Kemalpasa Umih; Dae Imlani; Sukarno Maut; Gerardo Rosario	8:31.48
4 × 100 m medley relay	Japan; Tadashi Honda; Nobutaka Taguchi; Hideaki Hara; Shinya Izumi	4:01.66; GR	China	4:08.70	Philippines; Gerardo Rosario; Amman Jalmaani; Mazier Mukaram; Jairulla Jaitulla	4:11.30

=== Women ===
Event	Gold		Silver		Bronze	
100 m freestyle	Yoshimi Nishigawa; Japan	1:01.63	Motoko Osawa; Japan	1:02.90	Elaine Sng; Singapore	1:04.61
200 m freestyle	Yoshimi Nishigawa; Japan	2:12.91; GR	Fusae Nakamura; Japan	2:17.85	Elaine Sng; Singapore	2:19.59
400 m freestyle	Fusae Nakamura; Japan	4:48.73; GR	Elaine Sng; Singapore	4:48.77	Atsuko Sakai; Japan	4:53.30
100 m backstroke	Suzuko Matsumura; Japan	1:09.57	Taeko Sudo; Japan	1:12.32	Yeo Su Ming; Singapore	1:13.85
100 m breaststroke	Toshiko Haruoka; Japan	1:19.16	Yoko Yamamoto; Japan	1:20.06	Nancy Deano; Philippines	1:20.48
200 m breaststroke	Toshiko Haruoka; Japan	2:51.61	Yoko Yamamoto; Japan	2:53.72	Nancy Deano; Philippines	2:54.92
100 m butterfly	Yasue Hatsuda; Japan	1:05.48; GR	Yukari Takemoto; Japan	1:08.00	Tay Chin Joo; Singapore	1:09.58
200 m individual medley	Yoshimi Nishigawa; Japan	2:26.20; GR	Yukari Takemoto; Japan	2:31.60	Nancy Deano; Philippines	2:40.30
4 × 100 m freestyle relay	Japan; Hiroko Kaneda; Motoko Osawa; Kayo Shibata; Yoshimi Nishigawa	4:09.82; GR	China; Cao Yunhua	4:21.77	Singapore; Justina Tseng; Esther Tan; Tay Chin Joo; Elaine Sng	4:22.53
4 × 100 m medley relay	Japan; Suzuko Matsumura; Toshiko Haruoka; Yasue Hatsuda; Yoshimi Nishigawa	4:35.04; GR	Singapore; Yeo Su Ming; Justina Tseng; Tay Chin Joo; Elaine Sng	4:52.20	Philippines; Grace Justimbaste; Nancy Deano; Susan Papa; Betina Abdula	4:55.99

== Medal table ==
Rank	Nation	Gold	Silver	Bronze	Total
1	Japan (JPN)	22	12	8	42
2	South Korea (KOR)	2	1	0	3
3	Israel (ISR)	1	0	1	2
4	China (CHN)	0	8	2	10
5	Philippines (PHI)	0	2	9	11
6	Singapore (SIN)	0	2	5	7
Totals (6 entries)		25	25	25	75

== Results ==
Note: The following lists may not be complete.

=== Men ===
==== 100 m freestyle ====
6 September

===== Heats =====
Rank	Athlete	Time
1	Lin Senlin (CHN)	56.07
2	Dan Brener (ISR)	56.34
3	Yao Chengzhi (CHN)	56.38
4	Shinya Izumi (JPN)	57.07
5	Sabeeh Mohammed (IRQ)	57.25
6	Akira Iida (JPN)	57.40
7	Dae Imlani (PHI)	57.76
8	Adi Prag (ISR)	57.80
9	Tan Bunthay (KHM)	58.05
10	Do Nhu Minh (VNM)	58.64
11	Heidar Shonjani (IRN)	58.75
12	Soen Lai Heng (SIN)	59.07
13	Ghodrat Shirazi (IRN)	59.73
14	Sukarno Maut (PHI)	59.75
15	Prak Samnang (KHM)	59.94
16	Bandar Al-Hamaidi (KUW)	1:01.74
17	Abdullah Thiab (KUW)	1:03.66
18	Muhammad Zarif (PAK)	1:06.57
—	Roy Chan (SIN)	DNS
—	Cho Oh-ryun (KOR)	DNS

===== Final =====
Rank	Athlete	Time
1st place, gold medalist(s)	Dan Brener (ISR)	55.56
2nd place, silver medalist(s)	Lin Senlin (CHN)	55.91
3rd place, bronze medalist(s)	Akira Iida (JPN)	56.31
4	Yao Chengzhi (CHN)	56.47
5	Shinya Izumi (JPN)	56.90
6	Adi Prag (ISR)	57.56
7	Sabeeh Mohammed (IRQ)	57.69
8	Dae Imlani (PHI)	57.84

==== 200 m freestyle ====
2 September

===== Heats =====
Rank	Athlete	Time
1	Yukio Horiuchi (JPN)	2:03.51
2	Akira Iida (JPN)	2:03.79
3	Adi Prag (ISR)	2:05.06
4	Cho Oh-ryun (KOR)	2:05.47
5	Lin Senlin (CHN)	2:05.64
6	Yao Chengzhi (CHN)	2:06.34
7	Tan Bunthay (KHM)	2:07.29
8	Dan Brener (ISR)	2:07.33
9	Jairulla Jaitulla (PHI)	2:08.00
10	Dae Imlani (PHI)	2:08.58
11	Soen Lai Heng (SIN)	2:13.73
12	Sabeeh Mohammed (IRQ)	2:16.25
13	Habib Nasseri (IRN)	2:17.21
14	Javad Goudarzi (IRN)	2:20.39
15	Muhammad Zarif (PAK)	2:27.29
16	A. A. Al-Hameedi (KUW)	2:40.97
—	Mark Chan (SIN)	DNS
—	Jassim Aziz (IRQ)	DNS
—	A. A. Nasser (KUW)	DNS

===== Final =====
Rank	Athlete	Time
1st place, gold medalist(s)	Yukio Horiuchi (JPN)	2:01.68
2nd place, silver medalist(s)	Cho Oh-ryun (KOR)	2:01.97
3rd place, bronze medalist(s)	Dan Brener (ISR)	2:02.61
4	Akira Iida (JPN)	2:02.88
5	Adi Prag (ISR)	2:05.33
6	Yao Chengzhi (CHN)	2:05.92
7	Lin Senlin (CHN)	2:05.94
8	Tan Bunthay (KHM)	2:06.56

==== 400 m freestyle ====
4 September

===== Heats =====
Rank	Athlete	Time
1	Shuji Ono (JPN)	4:25.99
2	Kaname Sakamoto (JPN)	4:27.51
3	Cho Oh-ryun (KOR)	4:28.78
4	Edwin Borja (PHI)	4:30.27
5	Dae Imlani (PHI)	4:32.60
6	Cao Hanming (CHN)	4:35.60
7	Dan Brener (ISR)	4:41.44
8	Deng Weixiong (CHN)	4:41.62
9	Fereydoun Jalili (IRN)	4:50.05
10	Habib Nasseri (IRN)	4:50.05
11	Jassim Aziz (IRQ)	4:57.13
12	Mohammed Jawad (IRQ)	5:06.04
13	Fawzi Irhamah (KUW)	5:24.90
14	Rashed Al-Otaibi (KUW)	6:07.54

===== Final =====
Rank	Athlete	Time
1st place, gold medalist(s)	Cho Oh-ryun (KOR)	4:17.93
2nd place, silver medalist(s)	Shuji Ono (JPN)	4:21.67
3rd place, bronze medalist(s)	Kaname Sakamoto (JPN)	4:23.84
4	Dae Imlani (PHI)	4:31.66
5	Cao Hanming (CHN)	4:32.00
6	Edwin Borja (PHI)	4:34.74
7	Deng Weixiong (CHN)	4:34.83
8	Fereydoun Jalili (IRN)	4:48.59

==== 1500 m freestyle ====
===== Heats =====
5 September

Rank	Athlete	Time
1	Cho Oh-ryun (KOR)	17:41.04
2	Edwin Borja (PHI)	17:43.82
3	Kaname Sakamoto (JPN)	17:46.21
4	Shuji Ono (JPN)	17:47.41
5	Dae Imlani (PHI)	18:28.50
6	Cao Hanming (CHN)	18:29.08
7	Guo Bianjiang (CHN)	18:55.68
8	Fereydoun Jalili (IRN)	19:05.68
9	Jassim Aziz (IRQ)	19:56.84
10	Tahmoures Rastin (IRN)	20:01.75
11	Mohammed Jawad (IRQ)	20:31.81
12	Fawzi Irhamah (KUW)	21:22.81

===== Final =====
7 September

Rank	Athlete	Time
1st place, gold medalist(s)	Cho Oh-ryun (KOR)	17:18.72
2nd place, silver medalist(s)	Shuji Ono (JPN)	17:28.60
3rd place, bronze medalist(s)	Edwin Borja (PHI)	17:41.81
4	Kaname Sakamoto (JPN)	17:54.34
5	Guo Bianjiang (CHN)	18:14.53
6	Cao Hanming (CHN)	18:24.69
7	Dae Imlani (PHI)	18:35.52
8	Fereydoun Jalili (IRN)	19:08.63

==== 100 m backstroke ====
6 September

===== Heats =====
Rank	Athlete	Time
1	Gerardo Rosario (PHI)	1:04.13
2	Toshimitsu Yamamoto (JPN)	1:04.59
3	Tadashi Honda (JPN)	1:04.98
4	Chiang Jin Choon (MAL)	1:05.43
5	Chen Huichen (CHN)	1:06.62
6	Bai Baocheng (CHN)	1:06.91
7	Mark Chan (SIN)	1:09.04
8	Mustafa Fahad (IRQ)	1:10.96
9	Fariborz Keshvardoust (IRN)	1:11.61
10	Mehdi Mohammed (IRQ)	1:13.84
11	Muhammad Rasab (PAK)	1:18.63
12	Faheed Al-Shatti (KUW)	1:18.86
13	Abdul Al-Hussain (KUW)	1:23.95

===== Final =====
Rank	Athlete	Time
1st place, gold medalist(s)	Tadashi Honda (JPN)	1:01.19
2nd place, silver medalist(s)	Gerardo Rosario (PHI)	1:03.04
3rd place, bronze medalist(s)	Toshimitsu Yamamoto (JPN)	1:03.76
4	Chiang Jin Choon (MAL)	1:04.38
5	Bai Baocheng (CHN)	1:05.34
6	Chen Huichen (CHN)	1:07.72
7	Mark Chan (SIN)	1:08.92
8	Mustafa Fahad (IRQ)	1:12.57

==== 200 m backstroke ====
2 September

===== Heats =====
Rank	Athlete	Time
1	Gerardo Rosario (PHI)	2:18.50
2	Toshimitsu Yamamoto (JPN)	2:19.74
3	Tadashi Honda (JPN)	2:19.89
4	Chiang Jin Choon (MAL)	2:21.23
5	Bai Baocheng (CHN)	2:22.53
6	Zhang Qiyuan (CHN)	2:26.95
7	Mark Chan (SIN)	2:28.00
8	Mustafa Fahad (IRQ)	2:32.81
9	Hossein Nasim (IRN)	2:32.81
10	Mehdi Mohammed (IRQ)	2:44.78
11	Mohammad Masrouri (IRN)	2:48.60
12	Muhammad Rasab (PAK)	2:53.69
13	Faheed Al-Shatti (KUW)	2:56.93
14	Mohsen Abdulrahman (KUW)	2:59.31

===== Final =====
Rank	Athlete	Time
1st place, gold medalist(s)	Tadashi Honda (JPN)	2:15.34
2nd place, silver medalist(s)	Gerardo Rosario (PHI)	2:15.87
3rd place, bronze medalist(s)	Toshimitsu Yamamoto (JPN)	2:18.39
4	Chiang Jin Choon (MAL)	2:18.49
5	Bai Baocheng (CHN)	2:18.72
6	Zhang Qiyuan (CHN)	2:24.35
7	Mustafa Fahad (IRQ)	2:35.25
—	Mark Chan (SIN)	DNS

==== 100 m breaststroke ====
3 September

===== Heats =====
Rank	Athlete	Time
1	Nobutaka Taguchi (JPN)	1:07.81
2	Lu Huankai (CHN)	1:09.83
3	Amman Jalmaani (PHI)	1:10.55
4	Kenichi Ueda (JPN)	1:10.61
5	Afshin Hazrati (IRN)	1:11.43
6	Xie Qingxin (CHN)	1:11.59
7	Umih Kemalpasa (PHI)	1:11.81
8	Yi Sokhon (KHM)	1:12.00
9	Behzad Rahimian (IRN)	1:13.07
10	Bernard Kan (SIN)	1:15.20
11	Rissan Khamees (IRQ)	1:18.44
12	Mohammed Ali Ghazi (IRQ)	1:18.90

===== Final =====
Rank	Athlete	Time
1st place, gold medalist(s)	Nobutaka Taguchi (JPN)	1:06.49
2nd place, silver medalist(s)	Lu Huankai (CHN)	1:09.00
3rd place, bronze medalist(s)	Kenichi Ueda (JPN)	1:10.18
4	Amman Jalmaani (PHI)	1:10.27
5	Afshin Hazrati (IRN)	1:11.02
6	Xie Qingxin (CHN)	1:11.43
7	Yi Sokhon (KHM)	1:13.88
8	Umih Kemalpasa (PHI)	1:15.53

==== 200 m breaststroke ====
4 September

===== Heats =====
Rank	Athlete	Time
1	Nobutaka Taguchi (JPN)	2:28.54
2	Ding Youcai (CHN)	2:34.52
3	Kenichi Ueda (JPN)	2:36.79
4	Tian Xiangchun (CHN)	2:37.30
5	Afshin Hazrati (IRN)	2:37.38
6	Amman Jalmaani (PHI)	2:39.98
7	Yi Sokhon (KHM)	2:40.37
8	Umih Kemalpasa (PHI)	2:41.17
9	Behzad Rahimian (IRN)	2:48.95
10	Rissan Khamees (IRQ)	2:50.93
11	Mohammed Ali Ghazi (IRQ)	2:53.36
12	Bernard Kan (SIN)	2:54.69
13	Muhammad Rifique (PAK)	3:04.31
—	Saleh Sultan (KUW)	DNS
—	Mohammad Abdulrazzaq (KUW)	DNS

===== Final =====
Rank	Athlete	Time
1st place, gold medalist(s)	Nobutaka Taguchi (JPN)	2:30.06
2nd place, silver medalist(s)	Ding Youcai (CHN)	2:33.08
3rd place, bronze medalist(s)	Kenichi Ueda (JPN)	2:35.22
4	Amman Jalmaani (PHI)	2:36.26
5	Tian Xiangchun (CHN)	2:36.49
6	Afshin Hazrati (IRN)	2:36.60
7	Yi Sokhon (KHM)	2:38.60
—	Umih Kemalpasa (PHI)	DNS

==== 100 m butterfly ====
5 September

===== Heats =====
Rank	Athlete	Time
1	Hideaki Hara (JPN)	58.65
2	Yasuhiro Komazaki (JPN)	59.36
3	Luo Zhaoying (CHN)	1:00.12
4	Adi Prag (ISR)	1:01.42
5	Michael Greenspan (ISR)	1:02.17
6	Mazier Mukaram (PHI)	1:02.24
7	Liu Hongqi (CHN)	1:02.87
8	Sukarno Maut (PHI)	1:03.11
9	Roy Chan (SIN)	1:03.77
10	Do Nhu Minh (VNM)	1:03.84
11	Shahram Azarfar (IRN)	1:04.43
12	Heshmat Ojagh (IRN)	1:05.70
13	Amer Mohammed (IRQ)	1:10.61
14	Abdullah Thiab (KUW)	1:11.17
15	Muhammad Fateh (PAK)	1:15.22

===== Final =====
Rank	Athlete	Time
1st place, gold medalist(s)	Hideaki Hara (JPN)	58.21
2nd place, silver medalist(s)	Luo Zhaoying (CHN)	58.44
3rd place, bronze medalist(s)	Yasuhiro Komazaki (JPN)	58.81
4	Adi Prag (ISR)	1:00.81
5	Michael Greenspan (ISR)	1:01.14
6	Mazier Mukaram (PHI)	1:02.42
7	Sukarno Maut (PHI)	1:02.97
8	Liu Hongqi (CHN)	1:03.00

==== 200 m butterfly ====
3 September

===== Heats =====
Rank	Athlete	Time
1	Yasuhiro Komazaki (JPN)	2:09.77
2	Hideaki Hara (JPN)	2:12.71
3	Luo Zhaoying (CHN)	2:14.84
4	Adi Prag (ISR)	2:15.38
5	Edwin Borja (PHI)	2:16.21
6	Mazier Mukaram (PHI)	2:16.24
7	Cho Oh-ryun (KOR)	2:19.31
8	Wu Caijin (CHN)	2:19.43
9	Roy Chan (SIN)	2:22.07
10	Shahram Azarfar (IRN)	2:23.07
11	Michael Greenspan (ISR)	2:24.49
12	Javad Mottaghi (IRN)	2:28.54
13	Muhammad Fateh (PAK)	2:54.16
14	Ahmad Thiab (KUW)	3:05.90

===== Final =====
Rank	Athlete	Time
1st place, gold medalist(s)	Yasuhiro Komazaki (JPN)	2:08.14
2nd place, silver medalist(s)	Hideaki Hara (JPN)	2:08.83
3rd place, bronze medalist(s)	Luo Zhaoying (CHN)	2:12.31
4	Adi Prag (ISR)	2:12.49
5	Mazier Mukaram (PHI)	2:14.61
6	Edwin Borja (PHI)	2:16.17
7	Wu Caijin (CHN)	2:17.82
8	Shahram Azarfar (IRN)	2:23.62

==== 200 m individual medley ====
7 September

===== Heats =====
Rank	Athlete	Time
1	Jiro Sasaki (JPN)	2:15.98
2	Tsuyoshi Yanagidate (JPN)	2:17.00
3	Jairulla Jaitulla (PHI)	2:18.49
4	Lu Huankai (CHN)	2:24.08
5	Adi Prag (ISR)	2:24.18
6	Luo Zhaoying (CHN)	2:26.53
7	Chiang Jin Choon (MAL)	2:29.32
8	Edwin Borja (PHI)	2:32.58
9	Sabeeh Mohammed (IRQ)	2:32.74
10	Iraj Raoufazar (IRN)	2:33.63
11	Do Nhu Minh (VNM)	2:35.94
12	Salem Hardani (IRN)	2:36.16

===== Final =====
Rank	Athlete	Time
1st place, gold medalist(s)	Jiro Sasaki (JPN)	2:14.41
2nd place, silver medalist(s)	Tsuyoshi Yanagidate (JPN)	2:15.31
3rd place, bronze medalist(s)	Jairulla Jaitulla (PHI)	2:15.32
4	Luo Zhaoying (CHN)	2:19.35
	Lu Huankai (CHN)	
	Adi Prag (ISR)	
	Chiang Jin Choon (MAL)	
	Edwin Borja (PHI)	

==== 400 m individual medley ====
6 September

===== Heats =====
Rank	Athlete	Time
1	Tsuyoshi Yanagidate (JPN)	4:55.75
2	Jiro Sasaki (JPN)	4:59.05
3	Jairulla Jaitulla (PHI)	5:03.83
4	Edwin Borja (PHI)	5:07.33
5	Zhang Guangyi (CHN)	5:12.68
6	Luo Zhaoying (CHN)	5:12.83
7	Shahriar Azarfar (IRN)	5:21.83
8	Chiang Jin Choon (MAL)	5:27.97
9	Iraj Raoufazar (IRN)	5:29.55
—	Cho Oh-ryun (KOR)	DNS

===== Final =====
Rank	Athlete	Time
1st place, gold medalist(s)	Tsuyoshi Yanagidate (JPN)	4:49.41
2nd place, silver medalist(s)	Jiro Sasaki (JPN)	4:50.62
3rd place, bronze medalist(s)	Luo Zhaoying (CHN)	4:59.07
4	Jairulla Jaitulla (PHI)	5:00.08
5	Edwin Borja (PHI)	5:12.39
6	Zhang Guangyi (CHN)	
7	Shahriar Azarfar (IRN)	5:26.05
—	Chiang Jin Choon (MAL)	DNS

==== 4 × 100 m freestyle relay ====
7 September

Rank	Team	Time
1st place, gold medalist(s)	Japan (JPN)	3:43.13
2nd place, silver medalist(s)	China (CHN)	3:44.96
3rd place, bronze medalist(s)	Philippines (PHI)	3:50.91
4	Singapore (SIN)	3:53.36

==== 4 × 200 m freestyle relay ====
3 September

Rank	Team	Time
1st place, gold medalist(s)	Japan (JPN)	8:16.05
2nd place, silver medalist(s)	China (CHN)	8:28.29
3rd place, bronze medalist(s)	Philippines (PHI)	8:31.48
4	Singapore (SIN)	9:01.39
5	Iran (IRN)	9:03.42
6	Iraq (IRQ)	9:23.42
7	Kuwait (KUW)	9:57.36

==== 4 × 100 m medley relay ====
5 September

Rank	Team	Time
1st place, gold medalist(s)	Japan (JPN)	4:01.66
2nd place, silver medalist(s)	China (CHN)	4:08.70
3rd place, bronze medalist(s)	Philippines (PHI)	4:11.30
4	Iran (IRN)	4:21.02
5	Singapore (SIN)	4:23.93
6	Iraq (IRQ)	4:30.31
7	Pakistan (PAK)	5:04.87

=== Women ===
==== 100 m freestyle ====
7 September

===== Heats =====
Rank	Athlete	Time
1	Yoshimi Nishigawa (JPN)	1:01.83
2	Motoko Osawa (JPN)	1:03.40
3	Elaine Sng (SIN)	1:05.71
4	Ye Wanchang (CHN)	1:05.72
5	Jiang Aihe (CHN)	1:06.00
6	Nancy Deano (PHI)	1:06.79
7	Raphaelynne Lee (HKG)	1:07.63
8	Grace Justimbaste (PHI)	1:08.74
9	Sansanee Changkasiri (THA)	1:09.00
10	Zinat Moayyed (IRN)	1:09.91
11	Rosanna Lam (MAL)	1:11.13
12	Justina Tseng (SIN)	1:14.02

===== Final =====
Rank	Athlete	Time
1st place, gold medalist(s)	Yoshimi Nishigawa (JPN)	1:01.63
2nd place, silver medalist(s)	Motoko Osawa (JPN)	1:02.90
3rd place, bronze medalist(s)	Elaine Sng (SIN)	1:04.61
4	Jiang Aihe (CHN)	1:04.77
	Ye Wanchang (CHN)	
	Nancy Deano (PHI)	
	Raphaelynne Lee (HKG)	
	Grace Justimbaste (PHI)	

==== 200 m freestyle ====
2 September

===== Heats =====
Rank	Athlete	Time
1	Yoshimi Nishigawa (JPN)	2:14.81
2	Fusae Nakamura (JPN)	2:19.22
3	Elaine Sng (SIN)	2:21.64
4	Ratchaneewan Bulakul (THA)	2:22.58
5	Anne Ho (SIN)	2:24.77
6	Cao Yunhua (CHN)	2:24.99
7	Zeng Guiying (CHN)	2:25.08
8	Sansanee Changkasiri (THA)	2:25.34
9	Grace Justimbaste (PHI)	2:31.13
10	Raphaelynne Lee (HKG)	2:36.79
11	Zinat Moayyed (IRN)	2:38.45
12	Lesli Firouzabadian (IRN)	2:47.87

===== Final =====
Rank	Athlete	Time
1st place, gold medalist(s)	Yoshimi Nishigawa (JPN)	2:12.91
2nd place, silver medalist(s)	Fusae Nakamura (JPN)	2:17.85
3rd place, bronze medalist(s)	Elaine Sng (SIN)	2:19.59
4	Ratchaneewan Bulakul (THA)	2:22.03
5	Cao Yunhua (CHN)	2:22.87
6	Zeng Guiying (CHN)	2:23.09
7	Anne Ho (SIN)	2:24.20
8	Sansanee Changkasiri (THA)	2:26.73

==== 400 m freestyle ====
5 September

===== Heats =====
Rank	Athlete	Time
1	Fusae Nakamura (JPN)	4:49.47
2	Atsuko Sakai (JPN)	4:52.24
3	Elaine Sng (SIN)	4:54.84
4	Ratchaneewan Bulakul (THA)	5:01.96
5	Anne Ho (SIN)	5:02.78
6	Zeng Guiying (CHN)	5:07.61
7	Sansanee Changkasiri (THA)	5:08.95
8	Cao Yunhua (CHN)	5:12.31
9	Raphaelynne Lee (HKG)	5:18.64
10	Grace Justimbaste (PHI)	5:29.76
11	Nastaran Hassanizadeh (IRN)	5:43.84

===== Final =====
Rank	Athlete	Time
1st place, gold medalist(s)	Fusae Nakamura (JPN)	4:48.73
2nd place, silver medalist(s)	Elaine Sng (SIN)	4:48.77
3rd place, bronze medalist(s)	Atsuko Sakai (JPN)	4:53.30
4	Anne Ho (SIN)	5:00.68
5	Ratchaneewan Bulakul (THA)	5:02.58
6	Cao Yunhua (CHN)	5:03.93
7	Zeng Guiying (CHN)	5:06.33
8	Sansanee Changkasiri (THA)	5:06.96

==== 100 m backstroke ====
3 September

===== Heats =====
Rank	Athlete	Time
1	Suzuko Matsumura (JPN)	1:10.34
2	Taeko Sudo (JPN)	1:11.74
3	Yeo Su Ming (SIN)	1:14.96
4	Grace Justimbaste (PHI)	1:17.89
5	Xu Huiqin (CHN)	1:19.75
6	Pan Weicheng (CHN)	1:20.12
7	Hui Kin Ping (HKG)	1:20.60
8	Shirin Firouzabadian (IRN)	1:21.37
9	Nastaran Hassanizadeh (IRN)	1:22.17

===== Final =====
Rank	Athlete	Time
1st place, gold medalist(s)	Suzuko Matsumura (JPN)	1:09.57
2nd place, silver medalist(s)	Taeko Sudo (JPN)	1:12.32
3rd place, bronze medalist(s)	Yeo Su Ming (SIN)	1:13.85
4	Grace Justimbaste (PHI)	1:17.88
5	Xu Huiqin (CHN)	1:18.34
6	Pan Weicheng (CHN)	1:18.35
7	Hui Kin Ping (HKG)	1:20.49
8	Shirin Firouzabadian (IRN)	1:21.72

==== 100 m breaststroke ====
2 September

===== Heats =====
Rank	Athlete	Time
1	Toshiko Haruoka (JPN)	1:19.47
2	Nancy Deano (PHI)	1:19.87
3	Yoko Yamamoto (JPN)	1:20.80
4	Zhang Haiying (CHN)	1:21.70
5	Liang Xuqiong (CHN)	1:21.88
6	Nava Kagan (ISR)	1:22.71
7	Tamar Meissner (ISR)	1:23.87
8	Kim Hye-sung (KOR)	1:24.50
9	Justina Tseng (SIN)	1:25.01
10	Esther Tan (SIN)	1:25.53
11	Rosanna Lam (MAL)	1:25.54
12	Lo Siu Kuen (HKG)	1:26.79
13	Tonia Valioghli (IRN)	1:30.65
14	Haleh Vafaei (IRN)	1:37.58

===== Final =====
Rank	Athlete	Time
1st place, gold medalist(s)	Toshiko Haruoka (JPN)	1:19.16
2nd place, silver medalist(s)	Yoko Yamamoto (JPN)	1:20.06
3rd place, bronze medalist(s)	Nancy Deano (PHI)	1:20.48
4	Nava Kagan (ISR)	1:21.45
5	Zhang Haiying (CHN)	1:21.71
6	Liang Xuqiong (CHN)	1:21.76
7	Tamar Meissner (ISR)	1:23.72
8	Kim Hye-sung (KOR)	1:23.75

==== 200 m breaststroke ====
4 September

===== Heats =====
Rank	Athlete	Time
1	Toshiko Haruoka (JPN)	2:53.21
2	Yoko Yamamoto (JPN)	2:56.40
3	Kim Hye-sung (KOR)	2:56.99
4	Nancy Deano (PHI)	2:57.18
5	Nava Kagan (ISR)	2:58.56
6	Liang Xuqiong (CHN)	3:00.67
7	Tamar Meissner (ISR)	3:00.82
8	Hu Xiaofeng (CHN)	3:04.97
9	Rosanna Lam (MAL)	3:05.28
10	Betina Abdula (PHI)	3:06.76
11	Lo Siu Kuen (HKG)	3:13.45
12	Tonia Valioghli (IRN)	3:14.44
13	Justina Tseng (SIN)	3:15.96
14	Haleh Vafaei (IRN)	3:22.06

===== Final =====
Rank	Athlete	Time
1st place, gold medalist(s)	Toshiko Haruoka (JPN)	2:51.61
2nd place, silver medalist(s)	Yoko Yamamoto (JPN)	2:53.72
3rd place, bronze medalist(s)	Nancy Deano (PHI)	2:54.92
4	Kim Hye-sung (KOR)	2:55.92
5	Nava Kagan (ISR)	2:56.15
6	Liang Xuqiong (CHN)	2:56.71
7	Tamar Meissner (ISR)	3:03.49
8	Betina Abdula (PHI)	3:13.13

==== 100 m butterfly ====
6 September

===== Heats =====
Rank	Athlete	Time
1	Yasue Hatsuda (JPN)	1:06.84
2	Yukari Takemoto (JPN)	1:08.04
3	Tay Chin Joo (SIN)	1:10.19
4	Susan Papa (PHI)	1:12.54
5	Sansanee Changkasiri (THA)	1:13.30
6	Xu Yafen (CHN)	1:14.61
7	Luo Yueming (CHN)	1:16.96
8	Ratchaneewan Bulakul (THA)	1:17.28
9	Linda Firouzabadian (IRN)	1:37.14

===== Final =====
Rank	Athlete	Time
1st place, gold medalist(s)	Yasue Hatsuda (JPN)	1:05.48
2nd place, silver medalist(s)	Yukari Takemoto (JPN)	1:08.00
3rd place, bronze medalist(s)	Tay Chin Joo (SIN)	1:09.58
4	Susan Papa (PHI)	1:12.14
5	Xu Yafen (CHN)	1:12.74
6	Sansanee Changkasiri (THA)	1:12.94
7	Luo Yueming (CHN)	1:16.03
8	Ratchaneewan Bulakul (THA)	1:20.22

==== 200 m individual medley ====
3 September

===== Heats =====
Rank	Athlete	Time
1	Yoshimi Nishigawa (JPN)	2:27.33
2	Yukari Takemoto (JPN)	2:32.22
3	Cao Yunhua (CHN)	2:43.48
4	Jiang Aihe (CHN)	2:43.65
5	Nancy Deano (PHI)	2:45.21
6	Justina Tseng (SIN)	2:45.46
7	Tamar Meissner (ISR)	2:45.81
8	Esther Tan (SIN)	2:48.00
9	Sansanee Changkasiri (THA)	2:49.78
10	Susan Papa (PHI)	2:50.34
11	Shirin Firouzabadian (IRN)	2:57.74
12	Hui Kin Ping (HKG)	3:05.89

===== Final =====
Rank	Athlete	Time
1st place, gold medalist(s)	Yoshimi Nishigawa (JPN)	2:26.20
2nd place, silver medalist(s)	Yukari Takemoto (JPN)	2:31.60
3rd place, bronze medalist(s)	Nancy Deano (PHI)	2:40.30
4	Jiang Aihe (CHN)	2:42.79
5	Tamar Meissner (ISR)	2:43.84
6	Cao Yunhua (CHN)	2:44.57
7	Justina Tseng (SIN)	2:45.71
8	Esther Tan (SIN)	2:47.34

==== 4 × 100 m freestyle relay ====
4 September

Rank	Team	Time
1st place, gold medalist(s)	Japan (JPN)	4:09.82
2nd place, silver medalist(s)	China (CHN)	4:21.77
3rd place, bronze medalist(s)	Singapore (SIN)	4:22.53
4	Philippines (PHI)	4:38.71
5	Iran (IRN)	4:52.02

==== 4 × 100 m medley relay ====
7 September

Rank	Team	Time
1st place, gold medalist(s)	Japan (JPN)	4:35.04
2nd place, silver medalist(s)	Singapore (SIN)	4:52.20
3rd place, bronze medalist(s)	Philippines (PHI)	4:55.99
4	China (CHN)	4:56.75
