= Malaysia at the 1974 Asian Games =

- IOC code: MAL
- NOC: Olympic Council of Malaysia
- Website: www.olympic.org.my (in English)

in Tehran
- Competitors: 106 in 8 sports
- Medals Ranked 17th: Gold 0 Silver 1 Bronze 4 Total 5

Asian Games appearances (overview)
- 1954; 1958; 1962; 1966; 1970; 1974; 1978; 1982; 1986; 1990; 1994; 1998; 2002; 2006; 2010; 2014; 2018; 2022; 2026

Other related appearances
- North Borneo (1954, 1958, 1962); Sarawak (1962)

Malaysia competed in the 1974 Asian Games held in Tehran, Iran from 1 to 16 September 1974. Athletes from Malaysia won five medals overall and finished 17th in a medal table.

== Medal summary ==
=== Medals by sport ===
Sport	Gold	Silver	Bronze	Total	Rank
Athletics	0	1	1	2	12
Field hockey	0	0	1	1	3
Football	0	0	1	1	3
Shooting	0	0	1	1	7
Total	0	1	4	5	17

=== Medallists ===
Medal	Name	Sport	Event
Silver	Ishtiaq Mubarak	Athletics	Men's 110 metres hurdles
Bronze	Junaidah Aman	Athletics	Women's 400 metres
Bronze	Malaysia national field hockey team	Field hockey	Men's tournament
Bronze	Malaysia national football team: R. Arumugam; Wong Hee Kok; Hanafiah Ali; Wong Kuw Fou; P. Umaparam; Mohamed Chandran; Soh Chin Aun; Shukor Salleh; Wan Zawawi; Ali Bakar; Mohammed Bakar; Syed Ahmad; Mokhtar Dahari; Harun Jusoh; Namat Abdullah; Santokh Singh	Football	Men's tournament
Bronze	Ally Ong; Edmond Yong; Stanley Lim; Yap Pow Thong	Shooting	Men's team skeet

== Athletics ==
Key

- Note–Ranks given for track events are within the athlete's heat only
- Q = Qualified for the next round
- q = Qualified for the next round as a fastest loser or, in field events, by position without achieving the qualifying target
- NR = National record
- N/A = Round not applicable for the event
- Bye = Athlete not required to compete in round

Men
Track event

Athlete	Event	Final	
Athlete	Event	Time	Rank
Ishtiaq Mubarak	110 m hurdles	14.49	2nd place, silver medalist(s)

Women
Track event

Athlete	Event	Final	
Athlete	Event	Time	Rank
Junaidah Aman	400 metres	55.78	3rd place, bronze medalist(s)

== Badminton ==
Athlete	Event	Round of 32	Round of 16	Quarterfinal	Semifinal	Final	
Athlete	Event	Opposition Score	Opposition Score	Opposition Score	Opposition Score	Opposition Score	Rank
Moo Foot Lian	Men's singles	Dinesh Khanna (IND); W 15–11, 7–15, 15–6	Yan Po Tim (HKG); W 15–12, 18–17	Liem Swie King (INA); L 9–15, 4–15	Did not advance		
Tan Aik Mong	Men's singles	Kim Yong-do (PRK); W 15–8, 15–6	Yang Mei Liang (HKG); W 15–3, 15–10	Nunung Murdjianto (INA); W 8–15, 18–15, 15–6	Fang Kaixiang (CHN); L 8–15, 5–15	Bronze medal match Liem Swie King (INA); L 12–15, 10–15	4
Dominic Soong; Moo Foot Lian	Men's doubles	Bye	Partho Ganguli; Davinder Ahuja (IND); L 15–6, 13–15, 11–15	Did not advance			
Sylvia Ng	Women's singles	—N/a	Mariko Nishio (JPN); W 6–11, 11–2, 11–3	Chen Yuniang (CHN); L 9–11, 2–11	Did not advance		
Rosalind Singha Ang; Sylvia Ng	Women's doubles	—N/a	Behnaz Nourazar; Rafat Yazdanparast (IRI); W 15–1, 15–1	Lin Youya; Qiu Yufang (CHN); L 8–15, 8–15	Did not advance		

== Field hockey ==
=== Men's tournament ===
Final round

Team	Pld	W	D	L	GF	GA	GD	Pts
Pakistan	5	4	1	0	35	1	+34	9
India	5	4	1	0	25	1	+24	9
Malaysia	5	2	1	2	15	6	+9	5
Japan	5	2	1	2	8	6	+2	5
Sri Lanka	5	1	0	4	11	29	−18	2
Iran	5	0	0	5	1	52	−51	0

6 September
13:30

Malaysia	9–0	Iran

Tehran

8 September
15:30

Pakistan	4–0	Malaysia

Tehran

9 September
15:30

Malaysia	6–0	Sri Lanka

Tehran

12 September
16:00

India	2–0	Malaysia

Tehran

13 September
15:30

Japan	0–0	Malaysia

Tehran

- Since both Malaysia and Japan were tied on points, a play-off game was played to decide the 3rd team.

14 September
10:00

Malaysia	3–1	Japan

Tehran

Ranked 3rd in final standings

== Football ==
=== Men's tournament ===
Squad

- R. Arumugam
- Wong Hee Kok
- Hanafiah Ali
- Wong Kuw Fou
- P. Umaparam
- Mohamed Chandran
- Soh Chin Aun
- Shukor Salleh
- Wan Zawawi
- Ali Bakar
- Mohammed Bakar
- Syed Ahmad
- Mokhtar Dahari
- Harun Jusoh
- Namat Abdullah
- Santokh Singh

Preliminary round; Group C

Pos	Team	Pld	W	D	L	GF	GA	GD	Pts	
1	Israel	3	3	0	0	17	3	+14	6	Qualified for the second round
2	Malaysia	3	1	1	1	15	9	+6	3	Qualified for the second round
3	Japan	3	1	1	1	5	4	+1	3	
4	Philippines	3	0	0	3	0	21	−21	0	

Source: RSSSF
3 September
16:30

Israel	8 – 3	Malaysia
Onana 4', 18'; Schwartz 10'; Feigenbaum 39'; Damti 48', 67', 89'; Massuari 75'		Zawawi 61' (pen.); Ahmad 75', 80'

Aryamehr Stadium, Tehran
Attendance: 5,000
Referee: Kim Joo-Won (South Korea)

5 September
16:30

Japan	1 – 1	Malaysia
Yoshimura 67'		M. Bakar 66'

Persepolis Stadium, Tehran

7 September
16:00

Malaysia	11 – 0	Philippines

Persepolis Stadium, Tehran

Second round; Group A

Pos	Team	Pld	W	D	L	GF	GA	GD	Pts	
1	Iran	3	3	0	0	4	0	+4	6	Qualified for the gold medal match
2	Malaysia	3	1	1	1	3	3	0	3	Qualified for the bronze medal match
3	Iraq	3	0	2	1	1	2	−1	2	
4	South Korea	3	0	1	2	3	6	−3	1	

Source: RSSSF
9 September
16:30

Iran	1 – 0	Malaysia
Ali Parvin 17'

Aryamehr Stadium, Tehran
Attendance: 35,000
Referee: Mohammed Azam (India)

11 September
21:00

Iraq	0 – 0	Malaysia

Aryamehr Stadium, Tehran

13 September
20:30

South Korea	2 – 3	Malaysia
Lee Hoi-Taek 12'; Park Yi-Cheon 81'		Harun Jusoh 10' 22'; Ali Bakar 78'

Aryamehr Stadium, Tehran

Bronze medal match

15 September

North Korea	1 – 2	Malaysia
Kim Jong-Min 58'		Isa Bakar 48' 81'

Aryamehr Stadium, Tehran
Referee: U Tin Htut (Burma)

Ranked 3rd in final standings

== Shooting ==
Men

Athlete	Event	Final	
Athlete	Event	Points	Rank
Wang Siew Meng	Air pistol	356	11
Wang Siew Meng	Centre fire pistol	553	11
Wang Siew Meng	Standard pistol	515	9
Wang Siew Meng	Free pistol	530	7
Tengku Bakar	Trap	134	8
Ally Ong	Skeet	183	4
Ally Ong; Edmond Yong; Stanley Lim; Yap Pow Thong	Team skeet	502	3rd place, bronze medalist(s)

== Swimming ==
Men

Athlete	Event	Heat		Final	
Athlete	Event	Time	Rank	Time	Rank
Chiang Jin Choon	100 m backstroke	1:05.43	4	1:04.38	4
Chiang Jin Choon	200 m backstroke	2:21.23	4	2:18.49	4
Chiang Jin Choon	200 m individual medley	2:29.32	7		7
Chiang Jin Choon	400 m individual medley	5:27.97	8	DNS	

Women

Athlete	Event	Heat		Final	
Athlete	Event	Time	Rank	Time	Rank
Rosanna Lam	100 m freestyle	1:11.13	11	Did not advance	
Rosanna Lam	100 m breaststroke	1:25.54	11	Did not advance	
Rosanna Lam	200 m breaststroke	3:05.28	9	Did not advance	

== Weightlifting ==
Men

Athlete	Event	Snatch		Clean & jerk		Total	Rank
Athlete	Event	Result	Rank	Result	Rank	Total	Rank
Harbans Singh	110 kg	115.0	8	150.0	8	265.0	8
Cheng Jiew Koon	+110 kg	–	–	–	–	–	DNF
