= Israel at the 1974 Asian Games =

Israel's competition at the 1974 Asian Games

- IOC code: ISR
- NOC: Olympic Committee of Israel

in Tehran, Imperial State of Iran
- Medals Ranked 6th: Gold 7 Silver 4 Bronze 8 Total 19

Asian Games appearances (overview)
- 1954; 1958; 1962; 1966; 1970; 1974

Israel participated in the 1974 Asian Games held in Tehran, Iran from 1 September 1974 to 16 September 1974. This was the last appearance of Israel in Asian Games. Athletes from Israel won overall 19 medals, including seven gold, and finished sixth in a medal table.

In this Games, athletes from the Arab nations, as well as Pakistan ,China, and North Korea – all of which refused to play with Israel; not in any of these 1974 Asian Games' events: tennis, fencing, basketball and football (soccer) – because of political reasons.

== Expulsion after the Games ==
Two years after the Games, Asian Games Federation barred Israel from participating in the 1978 Asian Games. In July 1976 the 25 members of the Asian Games Federation were canvassed to see if Israel should participate in the 1978 Games, with all 12 responses received voting against including Israel.

The real reason is that the Federation has seven Arab countries and China and they want to expel us.

— President of the Israel Olympic Committee, Joseph Inbar

== Medals ==
Games	Gold	Silver	Bronze	Total
Athletics	4	1	1	6
Basketball	1	0	0	1
Fencing	0	0	1	1
Football	0	1	0	1
Swimming	1	0	1	2
Tennis	1	1	1	3
Weightlifting	0	1	4	5
Totals (7 entries)	7	4	8	19

== Athletics ==
=== Men ===
Event	Gold		Silver		Bronze	
5000 m	Shivnath Singh; India	14:20.50	Yuval Wischnitzer; Israel	14:21.50	Kenichi Ozawa; Japan	14:22.15

=== Women ===
Event	Gold		Silver		Bronze	
100 m	Esther Roth; Israel	11.90	He Zufen; China	12.10	Keiko Yamada; Japan	12.42
200 m	Esther Roth; Israel	23.79	He Zufen; China	24.41	Emiko Konishi; Japan	24.94
1500 m	Song Meihua; China	4:28.68	Yang Yanying; China	4:29.17	Hana Shezifi; Israel	4:31.00
100 m hurdles	Esther Roth; Israel	13.31	Toshimi Hayashida; Japan	14.28	Miyuki Iioka; Japan	14.32
High jump	Orit Abramovitz; Israel	1.78	Mikiko Sone; Japan	1.78	Wu Fushan; China	1.74

== Basketball ==
=== Preliminary round - group B ===
==== Standings ====
Team	Pld	W	L	PF	PA	PD	Pts
Israel	1	1	0	122	73	+49	2
Philippines	1	0	1	73	122	−49	1

==== Games ====
September 2
8:30

Israel	122–73	Philippines

Aryamehr Basketball Hall, Tehran

=== Second Round - group B ===
==== Standings ====
Team	Pld	W	L	PF	PA	PD	Pts
Israel	3	3	0	216	161	+57	6
South Korea	3	2	1	336	288	+48	5
Japan	3	1	2	287	293	−6	4
Pakistan	3	0	3	175	274	−99	2

==== Games ====
September 7
17:00

Israel	2–0	Pakistan
Walkover

Aryamehr Basketball Hall, Tehran

September 9
19:00

Israel	116–93	South Korea
Scoring by half: 59–50, 57–43

Aryamehr Basketball Hall, Tehran

September 12
18:30

Japan	68–100	Israel
Scoring by half: 37–41, 31–59

Aryamehr Basketball Hall, Tehran

=== Final round ===
==== Bracket ====
Semi-finals
September 13
Israel	123
Philippines	101
September 13
China	114
South Korea (OT)	119

Final
September 15
Israel	92
South Korea	85
Bronze medal game
September 15
Philippines	89
China	102

==== Semi-finals ====
September 13
18:30

Israel	123–101	Philippines
Scoring by half: 62–45, 48–43

Aryamehr Basketball Hall, Tehran

==== Finals ====
September 15
15:30

Israel	92–85	South Korea
Scoring by half: 50–43, 42–42

Aryamehr Basketball Hall, Tehran

=== Roster ===
Coach: Abraham Hemo

- Motti Aroesti
- Shamuel Avishar
- Miki Berkovich
- Tal Brody
- Jacob Eisner
- Hanan Keren
- Itamar Marzel
- Avigdor Moskowitz
- Shamuel Nachmias
- Shuki Schwartz
- Boaz Yanai
- Shmaryahu Zaslevsky

== Fencing ==
=== Women ===
Event	Gold	Silver	Bronze
Team foil	Iran; Maryam Achak; Jila Almasi; Giti Mohebban; Mahvash Shafaei; Maryam Shariatzadeh	Japan; Hiroko Kamada	Israel; Nurit Carmi; Nili Drori; Inbar Guy; Orli Schreiber

== Football ==
=== Preliminary round - group C ===
==== Standings ====
Team	Pld	W	D	L	GF	GA	GD	Pts
Israel	3	3	0	0	17	3	+14	6
Malaysia	3	1	1	1	15	9	+6	3
Japan	3	1	1	1	5	4	+1	3
Philippines	3	0	0	3	0	21	−21	0

==== Matches ====
3 September	Israel	8 – 3	Malaysia	Aryamehr Stadium, Tehran
16:30	Onana 4', 18'; Shalom Schwarz 10'; Feigenbaum 39'; Damti 48', 67', 89'; Massuari 75'		Zawawi 61' (pen.); Ahmad 75', 80'	Attendance: 5,000; Referee: Kim Joo-Won (South Korea)

5 September	Israel	6 – 0	Philippines	Aryamehr Stadium, Tehran
16:30	Schweizer 16', 42'; Damti 24'; Shum 31'; Onana 41'; Feigenbaum 90'			Attendance: 60,000; Referee: Reza Heidari (Iran)

7 September	Japan	0 – 3	Israel	Aryamehr Stadium, Tehran
18:00			Feigenbaum 55', 63'; Damti 86'	Attendance: 30,000; Referee: Davoud Heidari (Iran)

=== Second round - group B ===
==== Standings ====
Team	Pld	W	D	L	GF	GA	GD	Pts
Israel	3	3	0	0	7	0	+7	6
North Korea	3	1	1	1	4	4	0	3
Kuwait	3	1	0	2	5	6	−1	2
Burma	3	0	1	2	4	10	−6	1

==== Matches ====
10 September	Israel	3 – 0	Burma	Aryamehr Stadium, Tehran
18:00	Yehoshua Feigenbaum 31'; Moshe Schweitzer 49'; Gidi Damti 89'			Attendance: 10,000; Referee: Jafar Namdar (Iran)

12 September	Israel	2 – 0 Awarded	North Korea	Aryamehr Stadium, Tehran
20:30

14 September	Israel	2 – 0 Awarded	Kuwait	Aryamehr Stadium, Tehran
21:00

=== Finals ===
15 September	Israel	0 – 1	Iran	Aryamehr Stadium, Tehran
19:30			Shum 30' (o.g.)	Attendance: 100,000; Referee: Mohammed Azam (India)

== Shooting ==
=== Air pistol ===
Rank	Athlete	Score
9	Dan Barkai (ISR)	359

=== Free pistol ===
Rank	Athlete	Score
8	Dan Barkai (ISR)	519

=== Air rifle ===
Rank	Athlete	Score
7	Zelig Shtroch (ISR)	368

=== Small bore rifle prone ===
Rank	Athlete	Score
5	Henry Hershkowitz (ISR)	585

Rank	Team	Score
5	Israel (ISR)	2316

=== Small bore rifle 3 positions ===
Rank	Athlete	Score
5	Zelig Shtroch (ISR)	1108

Rank	Team	Score
6	Israel (ISR)	4355

=== Small bore standard rifle 3 positions ===
Rank	Athlete	Score
6	Zelig Shtroch (ISR)	543

Rank	Team	Score
6	Israel (ISR)	2111

== Swimming ==
=== Medal summary ===
==== Men ====
Event	Gold		Silver		Bronze	
100 m freestyle	Dan Brenner; Israel	55.56	Lin Senlin; China	55.91	Akira Iida; Japan	56.31
200 m freestyle	Yukio Horiuchi; Japan	2:01.68	Cho Oh-yun; South Korea	2:01.97	Dan Brenner; Israel	2:02.61

=== Men's results ===
==== 100 m freestyle ====
===== Heats =====
Rank	Athlete	Time
2	Dan Brenner (ISR)	56.34
8	Adi Prag (ISR)	57.80

===== Final =====
Rank	Athlete	Time
1st place, gold medalist(s)	Dan Brenner (ISR)	55.56
6	Adi Prag (ISR)	57.56

==== 200 m freestyle ====
===== Heats =====
Rank	Athlete	Time
3	Adi Prag (ISR)	2:05.06
8	Dan Brenner (ISR)	2:07.33

===== Final =====
Rank	Athlete	Time
3rd place, bronze medalist(s)	Dan Brenner (ISR)	2:02.61
5	Adi Prag (ISR)	2:05.33

==== 400 m freestyle ====
===== Heats =====
Rank	Athlete	Time
7	Dan Brenner (ISR)	4:41.44

==== 100 m butterfly ====
===== Heats =====
Rank	Athlete	Time
4	Adi Prag (ISR)	1:01.42
5	Michael Greenspan (ISR)	1:02.17

===== Final =====
Rank	Athlete	Time
4	Adi Prag (ISR)	1:00.81
5	Michael Greenspan (ISR)	1:01.14

==== 200 m butterfly ====
===== Heats =====
Rank	Athlete	Time
4	Adi Prag (ISR)	2:15.38
11	Michael Greenspan (ISR)	2:24.49

===== Final =====
Rank	Athlete	Time
4	Adi Prag (ISR)	2:12.49

==== 200 m individual medley ====
===== Heats =====
Rank	Athlete	Time
5	Adi Prag (ISR)	2:24.18

=== Women ===
==== 100 m breaststroke ====
===== Heats =====
Rank	Athlete	Time
6	Nava Kagan (ISR)	1:22.71
7	Tamar Meissner (ISR)	1:23.87

===== Final =====
Rank	Athlete	Time
4	Nava Kagan (ISR)	1:21.45
7	Tamar Meissner (ISR)	1:23.72

==== 200 m breaststroke ====
===== Heats =====
Rank	Athlete	Time
5	Nava Kagan (ISR)	2:58.56
7	Tamar Meissner (ISR)	3:00.82

===== Final =====
Rank	Athlete	Time
5	Nava Kagan (ISR)	2:56.15
7	Tamar Meissner (ISR)	3:03.49

==== 200 m individual medley ====
===== Heats =====
Rank	Athlete	Time
7	Tamar Meissner (ISR)	2:45.81

===== Final =====
Rank	Athlete	Time
5	Tamar Meissner (ISR)	2:43.84

== Tennis ==
=== Medalists ===
Event	Gold	Silver	Bronze
Men's singles	Toshiro Sakai; Japan	Taghi Akbari; Iran	Yehoshua Shalem; Israel
Women's singles	Lita Sugiarto; Indonesia	Paulina Peisachov; Israel	Lany Kaligis; Indonesia
Mixed doubles	Israel; Yair Wertheimer; Paulina Peisachov	China; Xu Meilin; Zhang Ronghua	Japan; Ryoichi Mori; Kimiyo Yagahara

== Weightlifting ==
=== Medal summary ===
==== Medalists ====
Event	Gold	Silver	Bronze
Middle heavyweight (90 kg)
Snatch	Qian Yukai; China	Ali Vali; Iran	Adi Brana; Israel
Clean & Jerk	Ali Vali; Iran	Qian Yukai; China	Adi Brana; Israel
Total	Ali Vali; Iran	Qian Yukai; China	Adi Brana; Israel
Heavyweight (110 kg)
Snatch	Houshang Kargarnejad; Iran	Shlomo Ben-Lulu; Israel	Yun Suk-won; South Korea
Total	Houshang Kargarnejad; Iran	Yun Suk-won; South Korea	Shlomo Ben-Lulu; Israel

=== Results ===
==== 82.5 kg ====
Rank	Athlete	Snatch (kg)		Clean & Jerk (kg)		Total
Rank	Athlete	Result	Rank	Result	Rank	Total
4	S. Fried (ISR)					282.5
5	T. Kaplan (ISR)					262.5

==== 90 kg ====
Rank	Athlete	Snatch (kg)		Clean & Jerk (kg)		Total
Rank	Athlete	Result	Rank	Result	Rank	Total
3rd place, bronze medalist(s)	Adi Brana (ISR)		3rd place, bronze medalist(s)		3rd place, bronze medalist(s)	270.0

==== 110 kg ====
Rank	Athlete	Snatch (kg)		Clean & Jerk (kg)		Total
Rank	Athlete	Result	Rank	Result	Rank	Total
3rd place, bronze medalist(s)	Shlomo Ben-Lulu (ISR)		2nd place, silver medalist(s)			302.5
