= Shooting at the 1974 Asian Games =

- Venue: Shahanshahi Club; Aryamehr Sport Complex
- Dates: 2–7 September 1974

Shooting sports at the 1974 Asian Games was held in Aryamehr Sport Complex Shooting Range, Tehran, Iran between 2 September 1974 and 7 September 1974.

Shooting sports at the 1974 Asian Games comprised eleven individual and eleven team events, all open to both men and women. Each team could enter four shooters per event but only one score from each country counts in the individual competitions. It was the first time China participated at the Asian Games.

== Medalists ==
Event	Gold	Silver	Bronze
10 m air pistol	Jin Chunba; China	Baek Il-hyon; North Korea	Vichit Chiewvej; Thailand
10 m air pistol team	Thailand; Vichit Chiewvej; Sanasen Promma; Boriboon Vutiphagdee; Rangsit Yanothai	North Korea; Baek Il-hyon; Jun Sang-chol; Kim Gi-jong; Kim Yong-il	China; Bao Saina; Jin Chunba; Qi Kefa; Su Zhibo
25 m center fire pistol	Hiroyuki Akatsuka; Japan	Yang Qiang; China	Tüdeviin Myagmarjav; Mongolia
25 m center fire pistol team	China; Bao Saina; Su Zhibo; Yang Qiang; Zhu Huayu	Thailand; Vichit Chiewvej; Ratana Krajangphot; Viraj Visessiri; Boriboon Vutiphagdee	South Korea; Kim Dal-hyup; Kim Yong-bae; Koh Min-joon; Park Jong-kil
25 m rapid fire pistol	Yun Chang-ho; North Korea	Kanji Kubo; Japan	Zhang Runlong; China
25 m rapid fire pistol team	North Korea; Jun Sang-chol; Kim Heung-doo; Yun Chang-ho; Yun Eung-mook	China; Lu Zongjian; Wei Xinghang; Zhang Rongguo; Zhang Runlong	Japan; Hiroyuki Akatsuka; Takeo Kamachi; Kanji Kubo; Makoto Shiraishi
25 m standard pistol	Baek Il-hang; North Korea	Hiroyuki Akatsuka; Japan	Song Woong-ik; South Korea
25 m standard pistol team	Japan; Hiroyuki Akatsuka; Takeo Kamachi; Kazunori Kiyosue; Kanji Kubo	North Korea; Baek Il-hang; Jun Sang-chol; Kim Su-il; Yun Chang-ho	South Korea; Kim Dal-hyup; Kim Yong-bae; Park Jong-kil; Song Woong-ik
50 m pistol	Su Zhibo; China	Masanobu Ohata; Japan	Sutham Aswanit; Thailand
50 m pistol team	China; Jin Chunba; Qi Kefa; Su Zhibao; Yang Qiang	Japan; Masanobu Ohata; Isamu Suzuki; Shinji Takahashi; Shigetoshi Tashiro	Thailand; Sutham Aswanit; Samak Chainares; Ratana Krajangphot; Veera Uppapong
10 m air rifle	Ri Ho-jun; North Korea	Kwon Jeong-keon; South Korea	Paisarn Chamornmarn; Thailand
10 m air rifle team	North Korea; Han Dong-kyu; Kim Gyong-ho; Ri Ho-jun; Ri Yun-hae	South Korea; Kim Il-hwan; Kwon Jeong-keon; Lee Bum-hyuk; Nam Sang-wan	Japan; Takeo Imamura; Kimio Irie; Minoru Ito; Nobuhisa Tachibana
50 m rifle prone	Sachio Hosokawa; Japan	Ri Yun-hae; North Korea	Li Bingyou; China
50 m rifle prone team	North Korea; Choi Chang-yoon; Han Dong-kyu; Kim Gyong-ho; Ri Yun-hae	South Korea; Choi Chung-seok; Choo Hwa-il; Huh Wook-bong; Lee Kyun	Japan; Kumeo Fukasawa; Sachio Hosokawa; Kaoru Matsuo; Michiharu Ozaki
50 m rifle 3 positions	Han Dong-kyu; North Korea	Ge Weilie; China	Huh Wook-bong; South Korea
50 m rifle 3 positions team	North Korea; Han Dong-kyu; Kim Gyong-ho; Ri Ho-jun; Son Sung-hoon	China; Cui Shunyou; Ge Weilie; Leng Guiying; Liu Weisheng	Japan; Minoru Ito; Kaoru Matsuo; Michiharu Ozaki; Nobuhisa Tachibana
50 m standard rifle 3 positions	Han Dong-kyu; North Korea	Leng Guiying; China	Somporn Onzhim; Thailand
50 m standard rifle 3 positions team	North Korea; Choi Chang-yoon; Han Dong-kyu; Kim Gyong-ho; Ri Ho-jun	China; Cui Shunyou; Leng Guiying; Li Xiaohui; Liu Weisheng	Thailand; Paisarn Chamornmarn; Chawalit Kamutchati; Somporn Onzhim; Padet Vejsavarn
Trap	Jitsuka Matsuoka; Japan	Karni Singh; India	George Earnshaw; Philippines
Trap team	Japan; T. Hisashi; Toshiyasu Ishige; Jitsuka Matsuoka; Masao Obara	Thailand; Vudha Bhirombhakdi; Pavitr Gajaseni; Dipya Mongkollugsana; Phairoj Rodjaroen	South Korea; Choi Jeong-yong; Kim Nam-gu; Lee Chong-tae; Yun Moo-ung
Skeet	Taro Aso; Japan	Lee Seung-kyun; South Korea	Karni Singh; India
Skeet team	South Korea; Chang Je-keun; Lee Seung-kyun; Park Do-keun; Suh Hyun-joo	Japan; Taro Aso; Jitsuka Matsuoka; H. Takamatsu; Kazumi Watanabe	Malaysia; Stanley Lim; Ally Ong; Yap Pow Thong; Edmund Yong

== Medal table ==
Rank	Nation	Gold	Silver	Bronze	Total
1	North Korea (PRK)	10	4	0	14
2	Japan (JPN)	6	5	4	15
3	China (CHN)	4	6	3	13
4	South Korea (KOR)	1	4	5	10
5	Thailand (THA)	1	2	6	9
6	India (IND)	0	1	1	2
7	Malaysia (MAL)	0	0	1	1
7	Mongolia (MGL)	0	0	1	1
7	Philippines (PHI)	0	0	1	1
Totals (9 entries)		22	22	22	66
