= 1974 Asian Games medal table =

- Long jump podium at the 1974 Asian Games in Tehran. L-r: Kang Yueli, Xiao Jieping, Hiroko Yamashita
- Location: Tehran, Iran

Highlights
- Most gold medals: Japan 75
- Most total medals: Japan 175
- Medalling NOCs: 19

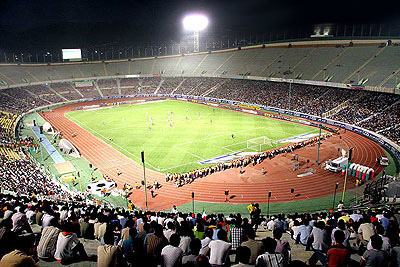
Aryamehr Sport Complex was the venue for all the events of the Games.

The 1974 Asian Games (officially known as the Seventh Asian Games) was a multi-sport event held in Tehran, Iran from September 1, 1974, to September 16, 1974. This was the first time that Asian Games were celebrated in any Middle East country. A total of 3,010 athletes selected from 25 Asian National Olympic Committees participated in 16 sports divided into 202 events. The number of participating countries was the greatest in Asian Games history, eighteen nations competed in Bangkok, host of the 1970 Asian Games. Fencing, gymnastics (artistic) and women's basketball were included for the first time; while sailing—which made its debut in the previous Asian Games—was not included, however since 1978, sailing is a part of the Asian Games sports.

The Republic of China (Taiwan) was expelled from the Games after the decision made in the Asian Games Federation's conference held on November 16, 1973, to allow the entry of the People's Republic of China. Mongolia and North Korea also entered the Games for the first time. Athletes from the Arab nations, Pakistan, China and North Korea refused to face Israel in tennis, fencing, basketball and football events, due to political reasons.

Nineteen nations earned medals at the Games, and fifteen of them won at least one gold medal. Japan led the medal count for the seventh consecutive time in the Asian Games, with 75 gold and 175 overall medals. Competitors from the host nation, Iran, finished at the second spot in the medal table, the best performance of Iran since 1951, claiming 81 medals in total (including 36 gold). In its debut, China finished third with a total of 106 medals, including 33 gold. South Korea devolved to fourth position with 16 gold and 57 overall medals, South Korea ranking second in the medal table of the previous Asian Games.

== Medal table ==
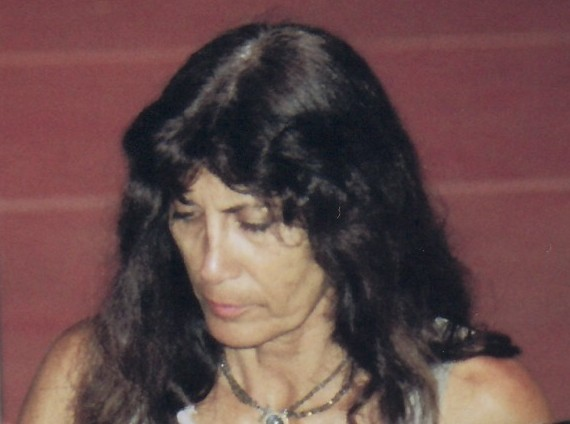
Esther Rot of Israel won three gold medals in athletics – 100 m, 200 m, and 100 m hurdles.

The ranking in this table is consistent with International Olympic Committee convention in its published medal tables. By default, the table is ordered by the number of gold medals the athletes from a nation have won (in this context, a nation is an entity represented by a National Olympic Committee). The number of silver medals is taken into consideration next and then the number of bronze medals. If nations are still tied, equal ranking is given; they are listed alphabetically by IOC country code.

A total of 609 medals (202 gold, 199 silver and 208 bronze) were awarded. The total number of bronze medals is greater than the total number of gold or silver medals because two bronze medals were awarded per event in boxing (except men's light heavyweight and heavyweight categories). In +100 kg category of freestyle wrestling, a tie for the first position in between the wrestlers of Iran and Japan meant that no silver medal was awarded. In gymnastics, a tie for second place in the parallel bars event resulted in two silver medals and thus no bronze was awarded, similarly a tie for first place in the uneven bars event meant that no silver medal was awarded.

* Host nation (Iran)

Rank	Nation	Gold	Silver	Bronze	Total
1	Japan (JPN)	75	49	51	175
2	Iran (IRN)*	36	28	17	81
3	China (CHN)	33	46	27	106
4	South Korea (KOR)	16	26	15	57
5	North Korea (PRK)	15	14	17	46
6	Israel (ISR)	7	4	8	19
7	India (IND)	4	12	12	28
8	Thailand (THA)	4	2	8	14
9	Indonesia (INA)	3	4	4	11
10	Mongolia (MGL)	2	5	8	15
11	Pakistan (PAK)	2	0	9	11
12	Sri Lanka (SRI)	2	0	0	2
13	Singapore (SIN)	1	3	7	11
14	Burma (BIR)	1	2	3	6
15	Iraq (IRQ)	1	0	5	6
16	Philippines (PHI)	0	2	12	14
17	Malaysia (MAL)	0	1	4	5
18	Kuwait (KUW)	0	1	0	1
19	Afghanistan (AFG)	0	0	1	1
Totals (19 entries)		202	199	208	609

== Changes in medal standings ==
On September 10, 1974, Oscar State, secretary general of the International Weightlifting Federation, announced that two weightlifters—North Korean Kim Joong-iI (heavyweight) and Japanese Masushi Ouchi (middle heavyweight)—had tested positive for a banned substance (stimulant) and were stripped of their medals. Kim had won three gold medals (snatch, clean & jerk and total) in the heavyweight category, while Masashi had won two gold (snatch and total) and one silver (clean & jerk) in the middle heavyweight. Kim usually competed in the middle heavyweight category, but due to being marginally overweight, he was forced to compete in heavyweight; after his disqualification, all three gold medals of the heavyweight category went to Houshang Kargarnejad of Iran. Snatch's gold and silver of clean & jerk of Masashi went to China's Qian Yukai and gold of total to Ali Vali of Iran.
