= Gymnastics at the 1974 Asian Games =

- Venue: Aryamehr Indoor Stadium
- Dates: 2–6 September 1974
- Competitors: 71 from 8 nations

Gymnastics was contested at the 1974 Asian Games, held in Tehran, Iran from September 2, 1974, to September 6, 1974. It was the first time that gymnastics was included as the medal sport in the Asian Games, and only artistic events were contested. In the Games, only four participating National Olympic Committees (NOCs) succeeded in winning any medal. China lead the medal table, with overall 18 medals (including eight gold), Japan finished second with four gold, and total nine medals. South Korea, although won only four total medals but its two gold helped it to clinch third position in final standings, while North Korea with one gold and 11 overall medals finished last.

Kazuo Horide of Japan won three gold medals in individual all-around, floor exercise and vault, and became the most successful male gymnast of the Games. Jiang Shaoyi of China won gold medals in all the individual events (except vault), and became the most successful gymnast of the Games. In men's events, China and Japan both won three gold medals, while two gold went to South Korea. Women's events were widely perceived as being dominated by China, who claimed nine medals in total, including five golds.

== Medalists ==
=== Men ===
Event	Gold	Silver	Bronze
Team	China; Cai Huanzong; Liao Runtian; Pan Chenfei; Wu Shoude; Yang Mingming; Zhao Jiawei	Japan; Kazuo Horide; Kenji Igarashi; Takeo Igarashi; Ryuji Nakayama; Hideyuki Nozawa; Hiroshi Sugawara	North Korea; Kim Song-il; Kim Song-jin; Song Sun-bong
Individual all-around	Kazuo Horide; Japan	Cai Huanzong; China	Lee Young-taik; South Korea
Floor	Kazuo Horide; Japan	Song Sun-bong; North Korea	Kim Song-il; North Korea
Pommel horse	Cai Huanzong; China	Yang Mingming; China	Kim Hwi-chul; South Korea
Rings	Kim Kuk-han; South Korea	Liao Runtian; China	Song Sun-bong; North Korea
Vault	Kazuo Horide; Japan	Cai Huanzong; China	Hideyuki Nozawa; Japan
Parallel bars	Lee Young-taik; South Korea	Hideyuki Nozawa; Japan	Shared silver
Parallel bars	Lee Young-taik; South Korea	Cai Huanzong; China	Shared silver
Horizontal bar	Cai Huanzong; China	Kazuo Horide; Japan	Pan Chenfei; China

=== Women ===
Event	Gold	Silver	Bronze
Team	China; Ding Zhaofang; Jiang Shaoyi; Ning Xiaolin; Wang Guiping; Wang Xuejun; Xin Guiqiu	North Korea; Hwang Jo-ya; Jo Yoon-hi; Kim Choon-soo; Pak Yung-sook	Japan; Kazue Hanyu; Chieko Kito; Kumiko Nagaoka; Yuko Nakamoto; Misa Watanabe; Reiko Yoshida
Individual all-around	Jiang Shaoyi; China	Ning Xiaolin; China	Xin Guiqiu; China
Vault	Reiko Yoshida; Japan	Hwang Jo-ya; North Korea	Jo Yoon-hi; North Korea
Uneven bars	Jo Yoon-hi; North Korea	Shared gold	Hwang Jo-ya; North Korea
Uneven bars	Jiang Shaoyi; China	Shared gold	Hwang Jo-ya; North Korea
Balance beam	Jiang Shaoyi; China	Xin Guiqiu; China	Jo Yoon-hi; North Korea
Floor	Jiang Shaoyi; China	Ning Xiaolin; China	Jo Yoon-hi; North Korea

== Medal table ==
Rank	Nation	Gold	Silver	Bronze	Total
1	China (CHN)	8	8	2	18
2	Japan (JPN)	4	3	2	9
3	South Korea (KOR)	2	0	2	4
4	North Korea (PRK)	1	3	7	11
Totals (4 entries)		15	14	13	42

== Participating nations ==
A total of 71 athletes from 8 nations competed in gymnastics at the 1974 Asian Games:

- China (12)
- Hong Kong (3)
- Iran (12)
- Japan (12)
- Kuwait (6)
- North Korea (12)
- Philippines (2)
- South Korea (12)
