= Philippines at the 1974 Asian Games =

- IOC code: PHI
- NOC: Philippine Olympic Committee
- Website: www.olympic.ph (in English)

in Tehran
- Medals Ranked 15th: Gold 0 Silver 2 Bronze 12 Total 14

Asian Games appearances (overview)
- 1951; 1954; 1958; 1962; 1966; 1970; 1974; 1978; 1982; 1986; 1990; 1994; 1998; 2002; 2006; 2010; 2014; 2018; 2022; 2026

The Philippines participated in the 1974 Asian Games held in Tehran, Iran from September 1 to September 16, 1974. Ranked 15th with no gold medals, 2 silver medals and 11 bronze medals with a total of 13 over-all medals.

== Asian Games performance ==
No gold medal. The country's production was only a pair of silvers by swimmer Gerardo "Ral" Rosario and 11 bronzes. Rosario placed second in both the 100-meter backstroke and 200-meter backstroke to become the only notable achiever in the country's worst performance ever in Asian Games history. The country sent 98 athletes and competed in 14 sports.

== Medalists ==
The following Philippine competitors won medals at the Games.

=== Silver ===
No.	Medal	Name	Sport	Event
1	Silver	Gerardo Rosario	Swimming	Men's 100m Backstroke
2	Silver	Gerardo Rosario	Swimming	Men's 200m Backstroke

=== Bronze ===
No.	Medal	Name	Sport	Event
1	Bronze	Willie Lucas	Boxing	Men's Featherweight 57kg
2	Bronze	Nicolas Aquilino	Boxing	Men's Light Middleweight 71kg
3	Bronze	George Earnshaw	Shooting	Men's Trap
4	Bronze	Edwin Borja	Swimming	Men's 1500m Freestyle
5	Bronze	Jairulla Jaitulla	Swimming	Men's 200m Individual Medley
6	Bronze	Dae Imlani; Edwin Borja; Gerardo Rosario; Sukarno Maut	Swimming	Men's 4 × 100 m Freestyle Relay
7	Bronze	Kemalpasa Umih; Dae Imlani; Gerardo Rosario; Sukarno Maut	Swimming	Men's 4 × 200 m Freestyle Relay
8	Bronze	Jairulla Jaitulla; Mazier Mukaram; Gerardo Rosario; Amman Jalmaani	Swimming	Men's 4 × 100 m Medley Relay
9	Bronze	Nancy Deano	Swimming	Women's 100m Breastroke
10	Bronze	Nancy Deano	Swimming	Women's 200m Breastroke
11	Bronze	Nancy Deano	Swimming	Women's 200m Individual Medley
12	Bronze	Grace Justimbaste; Nancy Deano; Susan Papa; Betina Abdula	Swimming	Women's 4 × 100 m Medley Relay

=== Multiple ===
Name	Sport	Gold	Silver	Bronze	Total
Gerardo Rosario	Swimming	0	2	3	5
Nancy Deano	Swimming	0	0	4	4
Dae Imlani	Swimming	0	0	2	2
Edwin Borja	Swimming	0	0	2	2
Jairulla Jaitulla	Swimming	0	0	2	2
Sukarno Maut	Swimming	0	0	2	2

== Medal summary ==
=== Medal by sports ===
Sport	Gold	Silver	Bronze	Total
Swimming	0	2	9	11
Boxing	0	0	2	2
Shooting	0	0	1	1
Totals (3 entries)	0	2	12	14
