= Philippines at the 1976 Summer Olympics =

- Flag of the Philippines
- IOC code: PHI
- NOC: Philippine Olympic Committee

in Montreal
- Competitors: 14 in 6 sports
- Medals: Gold 0 Silver 0 Bronze 0 Total 0

Summer Olympics appearances (overview)
- 1924; 1928; 1932; 1936; 1948; 1952; 1956; 1960; 1964; 1968; 1972; 1976; 1980; 1984; 1988; 1992; 1996; 2000; 2004; 2008; 2012; 2016; 2020; 2024

The Philippines competed at the 1976 Summer Olympics in Montreal, Canada. The Asian nation sent only fourteen athletes to Montreal, its smallest delegation since 1932, to compete in track and field, boxing, shooting, swimming and weightlifting.

== Results and competitors by event ==
=== Athletics ===
Men's Marathon

- Victor Idava — 2:38:23 (→ 57th place)

=== Boxing ===
Men's Light Flyweight ( – 48 kg)

- Eduardo Baltar
  1. First Round — lost to Armando Guevara (VEN), 0:5

Men's Bantamweight ( – 54 kg)

- Reynaldo Fortaleza

Men's Featherweight ( – 57 kg)

- Ruben Mares

=== Shooting ===
Men's Free Pistol

- Arturo Macapagal

Men's Rapid Fire Pistol

- Mariano Ong

=== Swimming ===
Men's 100m Freestyle

- Gerardo Rosario

Men's 400m Freestyle

- Edwin Borja

Men's 1500m Freestyle

- Edwin Borja

Men's 100m Backstroke

- Gerardo Rosario

Men's 200m Backstroke

- Gerardo Rosario

Men's 200m Butterfly

- Edwin Borja

Women's 100m Breaststroke

- Nancy Deano

Women's 200m Breaststroke

- Nancy Deano

Women's 400m Individual Medley

- Nancy Deano

=== Weightlifting ===
Men's Flyweight

- Salvador del Rosario

Men's Bantamweight

- Arturo del Rosario
