= Diving at the 1974 Asian Games =

- Venue: Aryamehr Swimming Pool
- Dates: 2–7 September 1974

Diving was contested at the 1974 Asian Games in Aryamehr Swimming Pool, Tehran, Iran from September 2 to September 7, 1974.

== Medalists ==
=== Men ===
Event	Gold	Silver	Bronze
3 m springboard	Xie Caiming; China	Koo Ho-suk; South Korea	Liu Sui; China
10 m platform	Li Kongzheng; China	Du Du; China	Tsutomu Kimura; Japan

=== Women ===
Event	Gold	Silver	Bronze
3 m springboard	Zhong Shaozhen; China	Song Yunzang; China	Kanoko Mabuchi; Japan
10 m platform	Zhong Shaozhen; China	Fusako Kakumaru; Japan	Lao Shucheng; China

== Medal table ==
Rank	Nation	Gold	Silver	Bronze	Total
1	China (CHN)	4	2	2	8
2	Japan (JPN)	0	1	2	3
3	South Korea (KOR)	0	1	0	1
Totals (3 entries)		4	4	4	12
