= Yasue Hatsuda =

Japanese swimmer (born 1959)

Personal information
- Nationality: Japanese
- Born: 12 September 1959 (age 66)

Sport
- Sport: Swimming
Medal record
Representing Japan
Asian Games
Gold medal – first place	1974 Tehran	100m butterfly
Gold medal – first place	1974 Tehran	4x100m medley relay
Gold medal – first place	1978 Bangkok	100m butterfly
Gold medal – first place	1978 Bangkok	200m butterfly
Gold medal – first place	1978 Bangkok	4x100m medley relay

Yasue Hatsuda (初田 恭江, Hatsuda Yasue; born 12 September 1959) is a Japanese former swimmer. She competed in three events at the 1976 Summer Olympics.
