= Yoko Yamamoto (swimmer) =

Japanese swimmer (born 1958)

Personal information
- Nationality: Japanese
- Born: 21 August 1958 (age 67)

Sport
- Sport: Swimming
- Strokes: breaststroke
Medal record
Representing Japan
Asian Games
Silver medal – second place	1974 Tehran	100m breaststroke
Silver medal – second place	1974 Tehran	200m breaststroke

Yoko Yamamoto (山本 容子, Yamamoto Yōko; born 21 August 1958) is a Japanese former breaststroke swimmer. She competed in three events at the 1972 Summer Olympics.
