= Park Do-keun =

South Korean sport shooter

Personal information
- Born: 1 October 1930

Sport
- Sport: Sports shooting
Medal record
Men's shooting
Representing South Korea
Asian Games
Gold medal – first place	1974 Tehran	Skeet team

Park Do-keun (born 1 October 1930) is a South Korean former sports shooter. He competed at the 1972 Summer Olympics and the 1976 Summer Olympics.
