= Somporn Onzhim =

Thai sports shooter (born 1942)

Personal information
- Nationality: Thai
- Born: 31 March 1942 (age 84)

Sport
- Sport: Sports shooting
Medal record
Men's shooting
Representing Thailand
Asian Games
Bronze medal – third place	1974 Tehran	Standard rifle 3 positions
Bronze medal – third place	1974 Tehran	Standard rifle 3 positions team

Somporn Onzhim (born 31 March 1942) is a Thai sports shooter. He competed in the men's 50 metre rifle three positions event at the 1976 Summer Olympics.

He also participated at the 1974 Asian Games and won two bronze medals.
