= Toshiko Haruoka =

Japanese swimmer (born 1959)

Personal information
- Born: 10 July 1959 (age 67)

Sport
- Sport: Swimming
- Strokes: breaststroke
Medal record
Representing Japan
Asian Games
Gold medal – first place	1974 Tehran	100m breaststroke
Gold medal – first place	1974 Tehran	200m breaststroke
Gold medal – first place	1974 Tehran	4x100m medley relay

Toshiko Haruoka (春岡 淑子, Haruoka Toshiko; born 10 July 1959) is a Japanese former breaststroke swimmer. She competed in three events at the 1976 Summer Olympics.
