= Suzuko Matsumura =

Japanese swimmer (born 1958)

Personal information
- Born: 22 February 1958 (age 68)

Sport
- Sport: Swimming
Medal record
Representing Japan
Asian Games
Gold medal – first place	1974 Tehran	100m backstroke
Gold medal – first place	1974 Tehran	4x100m medley relay

Suzuko Matsumura (松村 鈴子, Matsumura Suzuko; born 22 February 1958) is a Japanese former swimmer. She competed in two events at the 1972 Summer Olympics.
