= Ri Yun-hae =

North Korean sports shooter

Personal information
- Born: 3 September 1940 (age 85)
- Height: 5'6
- Weight: 143 Lbs (last recorded)

Sport
- Country: North Korea (DPRK)
- Sport: Sports shooting
Medal record
Men's shooting
Representing North Korea
Asian Games
Gold medal – first place	1974 Tehran	Rifle prone team
Silver medal – second place	1974 Tehran	Rifle prone

Ri Yun-hae (born 3 September 1940) is a North Korean former sports shooter. He competed in three events at the 1972 Summer Olympics. He placed 15th in Mixed Free Rifle, Three Positions, 300 metres. He placed 58th in Mixed Small-Bore Rifle, Prone, 50 metres, and he also placed 27th in Mixed Small-Bore Rifle, Three Positions, 50 metres. In his entire career, he has achieved 1 silver medal, and one gold medal.
