= Fusako Kakumaru =

Japanese diver (born 1958)

Personal information
- Nationality: Japanese
- Born: 13 June 1958 (age 68)

Sport
- Sport: Diving
Medal record
Representing Japan
Asian Games
Silver medal – second place	1974 Tehran	10m platform

Fusako Kakumaru (角丸 房子, Kakumaru Fusako; born 13 June 1958) is a Japanese diver. She competed in two events at the 1976 Summer Olympics.
