= Prag =

Prag may refer to:

- German, Swedish, Danish, Icelandic and Turkish for Prague
- Adi Prag (born 1957), Israeli Olympic swimmer
- Derek Prag (1923–2010), British politician
- Rameshbabu Praggnanandhaa (born 2005), Indian chess player
- Prague (2006 film), Danish film starring Mads Mikkelsen, Stine Stengade and Jana Plodková
