= Hideaki Hara =

Japanese swimmer (born 1956)

Personal information
- Full name: 原 秀章 (Hara Hideaki)
- Born: 1 August 1956 (age 69) Hiroshima, Japan

Sport
- Sport: Swimming
- Strokes: butterfly
Medal record
Representing Japan
Asian Games
Gold medal – first place	1974 Tehran	100m butterfly
Gold medal – first place	1974 Tehran	4x100m medley relay
Silver medal – second place	1974 Tehran	200m butterfly

Hideaki Hara (原 秀章 (Hara Hideaki), born 1 August 1956) is a Japanese former swimmer. He competed in three events at the 1976 Summer Olympics.
