= Jiro Sasaki =

Japanese swimmer (born 1956)

Personal information
- Born: 4 April 1956 (age 70)

Sport
- Sport: Swimming
Medal record
Representing Japan
Asian Games
Gold medal – first place	1974 Tehran	200m individual medley
Gold medal – first place	1974 Tehran	4x100m freestyle relay
Silver medal – second place	1974 Tehran	400m individual medley

Jiro Sasaki (佐々木 二郎, Sasaki Jirō; born 4 April 1956) is a Japanese former swimmer. He competed in three events at the 1972 Summer Olympics.
