= Tsuyoshi Yanagidate =

Japanese swimmer (born 1957)

Personal information
- Born: February 15, 1957 (age 69)

Sport
- Sport: Swimming
Medal record
Representing Japan
Asian Games
Gold medal – first place	1974 Tehran	400m individual medley
Gold medal – first place	1978 Bangkok	100m freestyle
Gold medal – first place	1978 Bangkok	200m individual medley
Gold medal – first place	1978 Bangkok	4x200m freestyle relay
Silver medal – second place	1974 Tehran	200m individual medley
Silver medal – second place	1978 Bangkok	400m individual medley

Tsuyoshi Yanagidate (柳舘 毅, Yanagidate Tsuyoshi; born 15 February 1957) is a Japanese former swimmer who competed in the 1976 Summer Olympics.

At the time of the Montreal Olympics, he was studying at Waseda University. He then got a job in Dentsu. He also served as the co-executive producer of the movie Real Onigokko (2008). He is currently the deputy director of Public Relations Bureau at the Tokyo Organising Committee of the Olympic and Paralympic Games.
