= Aquatics at the 1975 SEAP Games =

Aquatics at the 1975 Southeast Asian Peninsular Games

Aquatics at the 1975 Southeast Asian Peninsular Games included swimming, diving and water polo events. The three sports of aquatics were held in Bangkok, Thailand. Aquatics events were held between 11 December to 14 December.

== Swimming ==
Men's events

Event	Gold		Silver		Bronze	
100 m freestyle	(Singapore) Tan Thuan Heng	56.90	(Singapore) David Hoe	57.54	(Myanmar) Aung Khine	57.8
200 m freestyle	(Malaysia) Jonathan Davidson	2:04.8	(Singapore) Khoo Teng Chuan	2:05.7	(Singapore) Roy Chan	2:07.6
400 m freestyle	(Malaysia) Jonathan Davidson	4:26.2	(Singapore) Khoo Teng Chuan	4:26.33	(Myanmar) Aung Khine	4:35.3
1500 m freestyle	(Singapore) Khoo Teng Chuan	17:42.5	(Malaysia) Jonathan Davidson	17:43.4	(Myanmar) Aung Khine	18:35.9
100 m backstroke	(Singapore) David Hoe	1:03.93	(Malaysia) Chiang Jin Choon	1:04.86	(Singapore) Yeo Tseng Tsai	1:06.37
200 m backstroke	(Malaysia) Chiang Jin Choon	2:18.0	(Singapore) Yeo Tseng Tsai	2:18.2	(Singapore) David Hoe	2:23.5
100 m breaststroke	(Thailand) Prapis Huadlee	1:14.4	(Singapore) Felix Tseng	1:14.85	(Thailand) Kraisree Butrawong	1:15.12
200 m breaststroke	(Malaysia) Yik Tien Diew	2:45.45	(Thailand) Prapis Huadlee	2:45.90	(Thailand) Kraisree Butrawong	2:45.99
100 m butterfly	(Singapore) Vincent Lee	1:01.77	(Singapore) Roy Chan	1:02.7	(Myanmar) Nanda Kyaw Zwa	1:03.6
200 m butterfly	(Singapore) Khoo Teng Chuan	2:14.84	(Singapore) Richard Quek	2:16.0	(Myanmar) Nanda Kyaw Zwa	2:22.5
400 m individual medley	(Singapore) Khoo Teng Chuan	5:08.67	(Thailand) Chaod Bhobant	5:15.0	(Singapore) Yeo Tseng Tsai	5:15.29
4 × 100 m freestyle relay	Singapore	3:50.24	Malaysia	3:53.3	Thailand	3:54.3
4 × 200 m freestyle relay	Singapore	8:37.51	Thailand	8:44.5	Malaysia	8:57.5
4 × 100 m medley relay	Singapore	4:16.75	Malaysia	4:34.3	Thailand	4:37.5

Women's events

Event	Gold		Silver		Bronze	
100 m freestyle	(Singapore) Justina Tseng	1:02.8	(Thailand) Rachaniwan Bulakul	1:02.8	(Malaysia) Rosanna Lam Ai Leng	1:05.7
200 m freestyle	(Thailand) Rachaniwan Bulakul	2:15.9	(Singapore) Anne Hoe	2:18.9	(Singapore) Ang Siew Lan	2:24.7
400 m freestyle	(Thailand) Rachaniwan Bulakul	4:38.8	(Singapore) Junie Sng	4:40.36	(Singapore) Anne Hoe	4:41.07
800 m freestyle	(Singapore) Junie Sng	9:32.47	(Thailand) Rachaniwan Bulakul	9:35.7	(Singapore) Anne Hoe	10:08.34
100 m backstroke	(Malaysia) Vivian Tham Mei Keng	1:14.1	(Singapore) Angela Lecomber	1:15:76	(Myanmar) Anita Chen	1:17.0
200 m backstroke	(Malaysia) Vivian Tham Mei Keng	2:40.2	(Myanmar) Anita Chen	2:42.2	(Singapore) Angela Lecomber	2:44.50
100 m breaststroke	(Singapore) Justina Tseng	1:20.9	(Malaysia) Rosanna Lam Ai Leng	1:21.7	(Singapore) Desiree Lim	1:23.9
200 m breaststroke	(Singapore) Justina Tseng	2:53.29	(Malaysia) Rosanna Lam Ai Leng	2:54.1	(Singapore) Desiree Lim	2:57.07
100 m butterfly	(Thailand) Sansanee Changkasiri		(Singapore) Justina Tseng	1:10.7	(Singapore) Karen Chong	1:11.3
200 m butterfly	(Singapore) Justina Tseng	2:34.63	(Singapore) Karen Chong	2:36.21	(Thailand) Sansanee Changkasiri	2:40.4
200 m individual medley	(Singapore) Justina Tseng	2:36.38	(Malaysia) Rosanna Lam Ai Leng	2:40.69	(Myanmar) Anita Chen	2:40.72
4 × 100 m freestyle relay	Singapore	4:25.00	Malaysia	4:30.4	Thailand	4:33.7
4 × 100 m medley relay	Singapore	4:53.12	Thailand	5:00.8	Malaysia	5:02.8
