= Cho Oh-ryun =

South Korean swimmer (1952–2009)

Personal information
- Born: 5 October 1952
- Died: 4 August 2009 (aged 56) Haenam, South Korea

Sport
- Sport: Swimming
Medal record
Representing South Korea
Asian Games
Gold medal – first place	1970 Bangkok	400m freestyle
Gold medal – first place	1970 Bangkok	1500m freestyle
Gold medal – first place	1974 Tehran	400m freestyle
Gold medal – first place	1974 Tehran	400m freestyle
Silver medal – second place	1974 Tehran	200m freestyle
Bronze medal – third place	1978 Bangkok	200m butterfly

Cho Oh-ryun (Korean: 조오련, 5 October 1952 – 4 August 2009) was a South Korean freestyle swimmer. He competed in two events at the 1972 Summer Olympics. He later practiced long-distance open-water swimming, swimming the Korea Strait in 1980, and at the end of that year was awarded the Chreongryong Medal for his athletic feats. In 1982, he swam the English Channel, crossing from England-to-France in 9:35. In 2003 Jo served on the Korean Olympic Committee.
