= Singapore at the 1974 Asian Games =

- IOC code: SIN
- NOC: Singapore National Olympic Council
- Website: www.singaporeolympics.com (in English)

in Tehran
- Flag bearer: Yeo Kian Chai
- Medals Ranked 13th: Gold 1 Silver 3 Bronze 7 Total 11

Asian Games appearances (overview)
- 1951; 1954; 1958; 1962; 1966; 1970; 1974; 1978; 1982; 1986; 1990; 1994; 1998; 2002; 2006; 2010; 2014; 2018; 2022; 2026

Singapore participated in the 1974 Asian Games held in Tehran, Iran from 1 to 16 September 1974. Athletes from Singapore won overall 11 medals, including one gold and finished 13th in a medal table.

== Medal summary ==
=== Medals by sport ===
Sport	Gold	Silver	Bronze	Total	Rank
Athletics	1	1	2	4	8
Swimming	0	2	5	7	6
Total	1	3	7	11	13

=== Medallists ===
Medal	Name	Sport	Event
Gold	Chee Swee Lee	Athletics	Women's 400 m
Silver	Glory Barnabas; Lee Tai Jong; Maimoon Azlan; Chee Swee Lee	Athletics	Women's 4 × 400 m relay
Silver	Elaine Sng	Swimming	Women's 400 m freestyle
Silver	Yeo Su Ming; Justina Tseng; Tay Chin Joo; Elaine Sng	Swimming	Women's 4 × 100 m medley relay
Bronze	C. Kunalan; Ong Yoke Phee; Tan Say Leong; Yeo Kian Chye	Athletics	Men's 4 × 100 m relay
Bronze	Eng Chiew Quay; Chee Swee Lee; Glory Barnabas; Maimoon Azlan	Athletics	Women's 4 × 100 m relay
Bronze	Elaine Sng	Swimming	Women's 100 m freestyle
Bronze	Yeo Su Ming	Swimming	Women's 100 m backstroke
Bronze	Elaine Sng	Swimming	Women's 200 m freestyle
Bronze	Elaine Sng; Esther Tan; Justina Tseng; Tay Chin Joo	Swimming	Women's 4 × 100 m freestyle relay
