= Dae Imlani =

Filipino swimmer (born 1954)

Personal information
- Born: 12 May 1954 (age 72)

Sport
- Sport: Swimming
Medal record
Representing Philippines
Asian Games
Silver medal – second place	1970 Bangkok	4x100m freestyle relay
Bronze medal – third place	1974 Tehran	4x100m freestyle relay
Bronze medal – third place	1974 Tehran	4x200m freestyle relay

Dae Imlani (born 12 May 1954) is a former Filipino swimmer. He competed in four events at the 1972 Summer Olympics. He won silver medals in the 4 x 100 metre freestyle relay and the 4 x 200 metre freestyle relay at the 1970 Asian Games.
