= Houshang Kargarnejad =

Iranian weightlifter (born 1945)

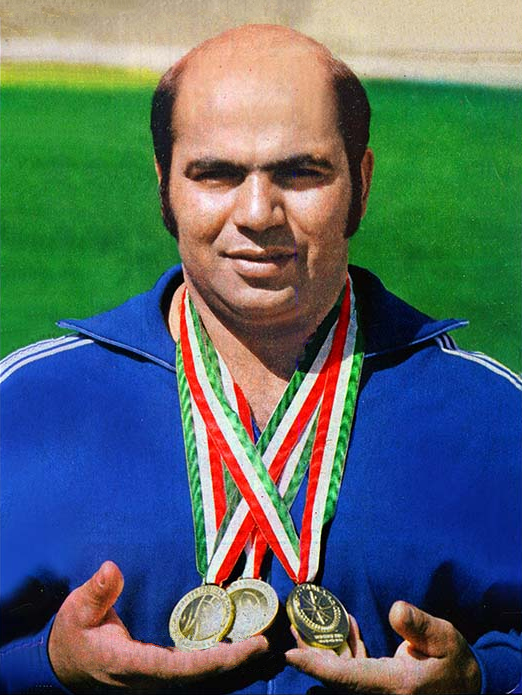
- Kargarnejad at the 1974 Asian Games

Personal information
- Born: 23 April 1945 (age 81)
- Height: 174 cm (5 ft 9 in)
- Weight: 110 kg (243 lb)

Sport
- Sport: Weightlifting
Medal record
Representing Iran
Asian Games
Bronze medal – third place	1970 Bangkok	-110 kg
Gold medal – first place	1974 Tehran	-110 kg
Asian Weightlifting Championships
Gold medal – first place	1971 Manila	-110 kg
Gold medal – first place	1977 Baghdad	-110 kg

Houshang Kargarnejad (Persian: هوشنگ کارگرنژاد, born 23 April 1945) is a retired Iranian heavyweight weightlifter who competed at the 1976 Summer Olympics. He won gold medals at the 1974 Asian Games and 1971 and 1977 Asian Championships.
