= Adi Prag =

Israeli swimmer

Adi Prag עדי פרג
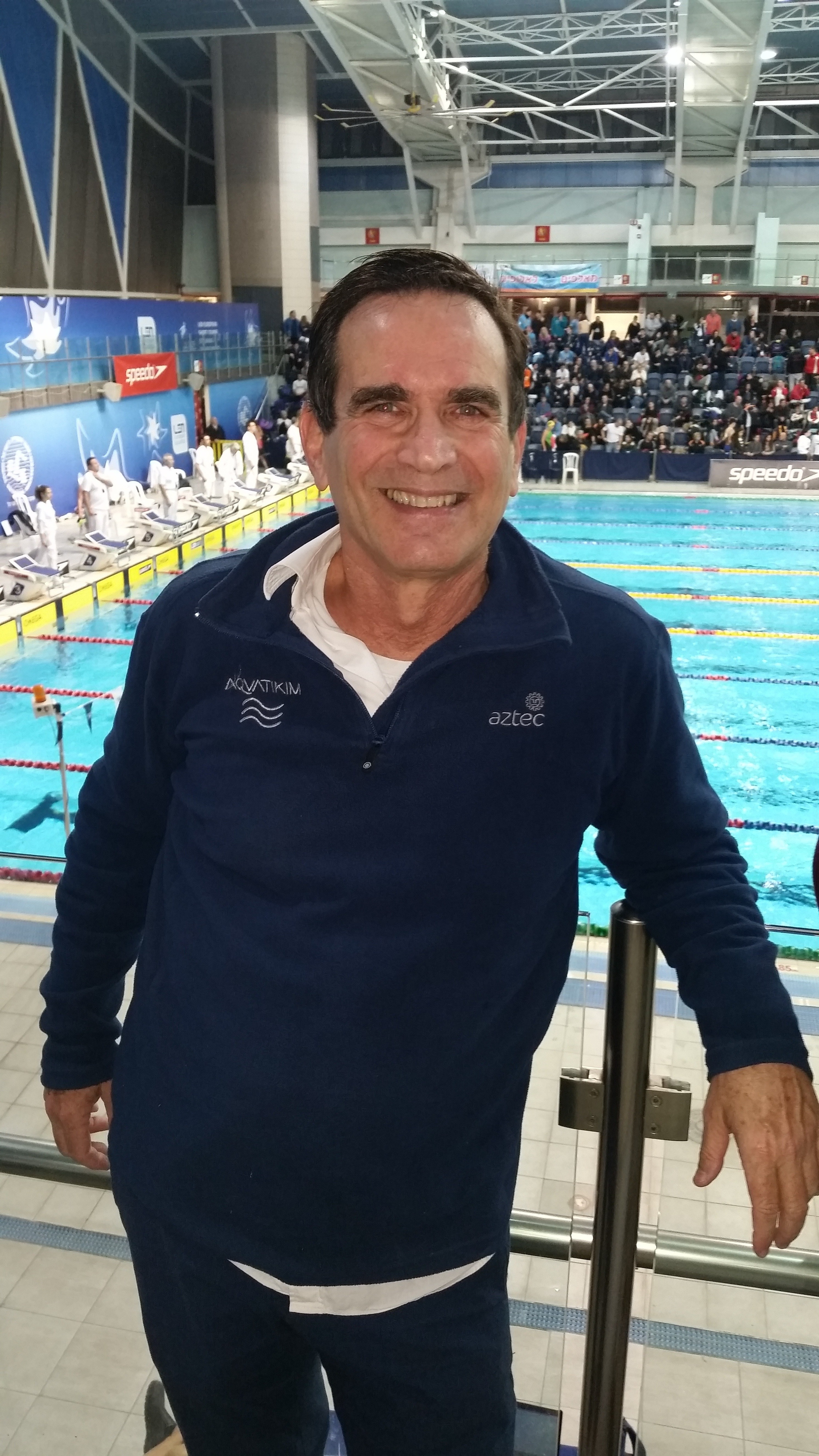

Personal information
- Nationality: Israeli
- Born: December 15, 1957 (age 68)

Sport
- Sport: Swimming
- Strokes: 100 m and 200 m butterfly 100 m and 200 m freestyle 200 m individual medley

Adi Prag (Hebrew: עדי פרג; born December 15, 1957) is an Israeli former Olympic swimmer.

== Swimming career ==
He competed for Israel at the 1974 Asian Games in Tehran, Iran, in swimming in the 100 m and 200 m butterfly (coming in 4th in both), in the 200 m freestyle (coming in 5th), in the 100 m freestyle (coming in 6th), and in the 200 m individual medley.

Prag represented Israel at the 1976 Summer Olympics in Montreal, Quebec, Canada, in swimming, at the age of 18. He was the youngest Israeli competitor at the 1976 Games. He competed in the Men's 100 metre butterfly, and came in 6th in Heat 1. He also competed in the Men's 200 metre butterfly, and came in 5th in Heat 2.
