= Nancy Deano =

Filipino swimmer

Personal information
- Full name: Nancy Deano

Sport
- Sport: Swimming
Medal record
Representing Philippines
Asian Games
Bronze medal – third place	1974 Tehran	100m breaststroke
Bronze medal – third place	1974 Tehran	200m breaststroke
Bronze medal – third place	1974 Tehran	4x100m medley relay
SEA Games
Silver medal – second place	1977 Kuala Lumpur	100m freestyle
Silver medal – second place	1977 Kuala Lumpur	200m backstroke
Bronze medal – third place	1979 Jakarta	100m breaststroke

Nancy Deano is a Filipino former swimmer. She competed in three events at the 1976 Summer Olympics.
