= South Korea at the 1974 Asian Games =

- IOC code: KOR
- NOC: Korean Olympic Committee

in Tehran
- Competitors: 177 in 16 sports
- Flag bearer: Lee Jong-Seob
- Officials: 54
- Medals Ranked 4th: Gold 16 Silver 26 Bronze 15 Total 57

Asian Games appearances (overview)
- 1954; 1958; 1962; 1966; 1970; 1974; 1978; 1982; 1986; 1990; 1994; 1998; 2002; 2006; 2010; 2014; 2018; 2022; 2026

South Korea (IOC designation: Korea) participated in the 1974 Asian Games held in Tehran, Iran, from September 1, 1974, to September 16, 1974.

== Medal summary ==
=== Medal table ===
Sport	Gold	Silver	Bronze	Total
Boxing	5	2	0	7
Weightlifting	3	3	2	8
Swimming	2	1	0	3
Gymnastics	2	0	2	4
Shooting	1	4	5	10
Wrestling	1	4	3	8
Tennis	1	1	0	2
Athletics	1	0	1	2
Table tennis	0	3	0	3
Cycling	0	2	2	4
Basketball	0	2	0	2
Volleyball	0	2	0	2
Diving	0	1	0	1
Fencing	0	1	0	1
Totals (14 entries)	16	26	15	57
