= Yap Pow Thong =

Malaysian sports shooter (born 1918; deceased)

Personal information
- Born: 8 November 1918

Sport
- Sport: Sports shooting

Yap Pow Thong (born 8 November 1918, date of death unknown) was a Malaysian sports shooter. He competed in the trap event at the 1964 Summer Olympics. He also won a bronze medal in team trap event at the 1974 Asian Games. Yap is deceased.
