= Ali Vali =

Iranian weightlifter

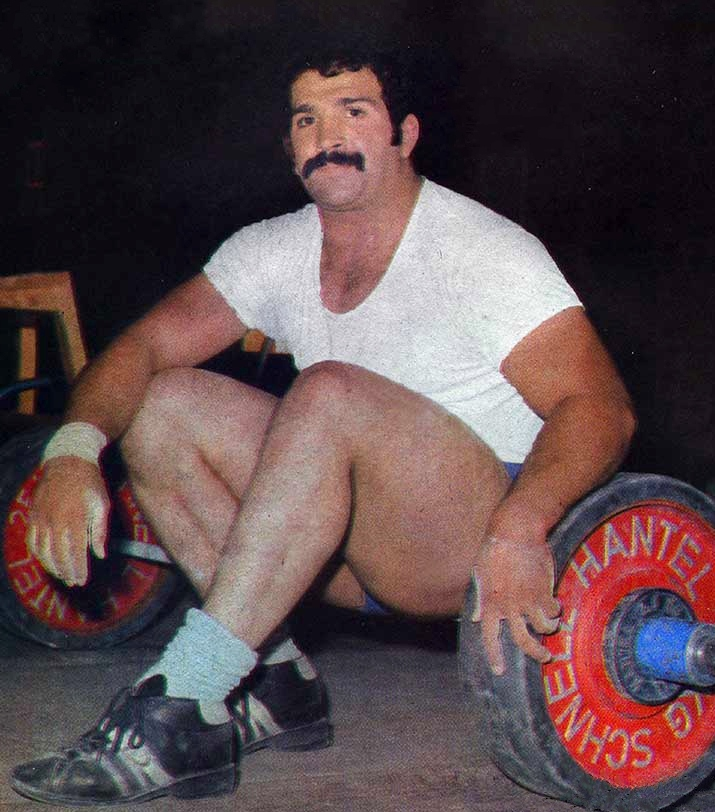

Personal information
- Born: 19 October 1950 (age 75) Tehran, Iran
- Height: 171 cm (5 ft 7 in)

Sport
- Sport: Weightlifting
Medal record
Representing Iran
Asian Games
Gold medal – first place	1974 Tehran	-90 kg
Asian Championships
Gold medal – first place	1971 Manila	-90 kg

Ali Vali (Persian: علی والی, born 19 October 1950) is a retired Iranian heavyweight weightlifter who won gold medals at the 1971 Asian Championships and 1974 Asian Games. He also competed at the 1976 Summer Olympics, but failed to complete the clean and jerk event.
