= Edwin Borja =

Filipino swimmer (born 1958)

Personal information
- Born: 6 July 1958
- Died: 18 March 2025 (aged 66) Neptune, New Jersey

Sport
- Sport: Swimming
Medal record
Representing Philippines
Asian Games
Bronze medal – third place	1974 Tehran	1500m freestyle
Bronze medal – third place	1974 Tehran	4x100m freestyle relay

Edwin D. Borja (6 July 1958 – 18 March 2025) was a Filipino swimmer. He competed at the 1972 Summer Olympics and the 1976 Summer Olympics.

== Career ==
At just 14 years old, Borja participated in his first Olympic Games, securing 41st place in the men's 1,500 meters freestyle and 14th place in the 4 × 200 meters freestyle relay at the 1972 Summer Olympics. In 1974, he competed in the Asian Games, where he won two bronze medals.

In 1976, Borja reset the Asian record in the 1,500-meter freestyle swim with a time of 17:12.9 at the Philippine Amateur Championships. He returned to the Olympics for the 1976 Summer Games, where he placed 44th in the men's 400 meters freestyle, 28th in the 1,500 meters freestyle, 32nd in the 200 meters butterfly, and 30th in the 400 meters individual medley.

== Personal life ==
Borja's brother Edgar is also an Olympian swimmer. He was among the Filipino athletes who boycotted the 1980 Summer Olympics in Moscow. Both brothers attended La Salle University in Philadelphia.

== Death ==
On March 7, 2025, Borja's car was hit along New Jersey Route 70 in Lakewood, New Jersey by the driver of a Cadillac CT5 Blackwing allegedly driving in the opposite direction at over 103 miles per hour; he succumbed to his injuries at the Jersey Shore University Medical Center in Neptune, New Jersey on March 18. A suspect surrendered in August 2025.
