= Pakistan at the 1974 Asian Games =

- IOC code: PAK
- NOC: Pakistan Olympic Association

in Tehran
- Medals Ranked 11th: Gold 2 Silver 0 Bronze 9 Total 11

Asian Games appearances (overview)
- 1954; 1958; 1962; 1966; 1970; 1974; 1978; 1982; 1986; 1990; 1994; 1998; 2002; 2006; 2010; 2014; 2018; 2022; 2026

Pakistan participated in the 1974 Asian Games held in Tehran, Iran from 1 to 16 September 1974. Athletes from Pakistan won overall 11 medals, including two gold, and were 11th on the medals table.
