= Raphaelynne Lee =

Hong Kong swimmer (born 1959)

Personal information
- Born: 24 October 1959 (age 66)

Sport
- Sport: Swimming

Raphaelynne Lee (born 24 October 1959) is a Hong Kong former backstroke and freestyle swimmer. She competed in two events at the 1976 Summer Olympics.
