= Sansanee Changkasiri =

Thai swimmer (born 1962)

Personal information
- Born: 29 April 1962 (age 64)

Sport
- Sport: Swimming
Medal record
Representing Thailand
Asian Games
Bronze medal – third place	1978 Bangkok	4x100m freestyle relay
SEA Games
Gold medal – first place	1975 Bangkok	100m butterfly
Bronze medal – third place	1973 Singapore	200m butterfly
Bronze medal – third place	1973 Singapore	4x100m freestyle relay

Sansanee Changkasiri (born 29 April 1962) is a Thai former swimmer. She competed in three events at the 1976 Summer Olympics.
