= Iraq at the 1974 Asian Games =

- IOC code: IRQ
- NOC: National Olympic Committee of Iraq

in Tehran
- Medals Ranked 15th: Gold 1 Silver 0 Bronze 5 Total 6

Asian Games appearances (overview)
- 1974; 1978; 1982; 1986; 1990–2002; 2006; 2010; 2014; 2018; 2022; 2026

Iraq participated in the 1974 Asian Games held in Tehran, Iran from 1 to 16 September 1974. Athletes from Iraq won overall six medals, including one gold medals and finished 15th in a medal table.
