= Ally Ong =

Malaysian sports shooter

Personal information
- Nationality: Malaysian
- Born: 14 September 1943 (age 81)

Sport
- Sport: Sports shooting

Ally Ong (born 14 September 1943) is a Malaysian sports shooter. He competed in the mixed skeet event at the 1976 Summer Olympics.
