= India at the 1974 Asian Games =

- IOC code: IND
- NOC: Indian Olympic Association

in Tehran
- Medals Ranked 7th: Gold 4 Silver 12 Bronze 12 Total 28

Asian Games appearances (overview)
- 1951; 1954; 1958; 1962; 1966; 1970; 1974; 1978; 1982; 1986; 1990; 1994; 1998; 2002; 2006; 2010; 2014; 2018; 2022; 2026

India participated in the 1974 Asian Games held in Tehran, Iran from 1 to 16 September 1974. Athletes from India won overall 28 medals, including four gold, and finished seventh in a medal table.

== Medals by sport ==
Sport	Gold	Silver	Bronze	Total
Athletics	4	7	4	15
Boxing	0	3	2	5
Badminton	0	0	1	1
Hockey	0	1	0	1
Shooting	0	1	1	2
Wrestling	0	0	4	4
Total	4	12	12	28

== Football ==
Head coach: P. K. Banerjee

No.	Pos.	Player	Date of birth (age)	Caps	Goals	Club
	GK	E.N. Sudhir				(All India Football Federation) Maharashtra
	GK	Prasanta Mitra				(All India Football Federation) Bengal
	DF	Nicholas Pereira				(All India Football Federation) Goa
	DF	Shyamal Ghosh				(All India Football Federation) East Bengal
	DF	Kajal Dhali				(All India Football Federation) East Bengal
	DF	Prabir Majumdar				(All India Football Federation) Bengal
	DF	Pradeep Chowdhury				(All India Football Federation) Maharashtra
	DF	Gurdev Singh Gill	20 April 1950 (aged 24)			(All India Football Federation) Punjab Police
	DF	Dilip Palit				(All India Football Federation) Railways
	MF	Shyam Sunder Manna				(All India Football Federation) Bengal
	MF	Doraiswami Nataraj				(All India Football Federation) Mysore
	MF	Gautam Sarkar	8 January 1950 (aged 24)			(All India Football Federation) Bengal
	MF	Prasun Banerjee	6 April 1955 (aged 19)			(All India Football Federation) Bengal
	FW	Surajit Sengupta	30 August 1951 (aged 23)			(All India Football Federation) East Bengal
	FW	Subhash Bhowmick	2 October 1950 (aged 23)			(All India Football Federation) East Bengal
	FW	Mohammed Habib	17 July 1949 (aged 25)			(All India Football Federation) East Bengal
	FW	Shyam Thapa	1 May 1948 (aged 26)			(All India Football Federation) Maharashtra
	FW	Magan Singh Rajvi				(All India Football Federation) RAC Bikaner

=== Preliminary round ===
Pos	Team	Pld	W	D	L	GF	GA	GD	Pts
1	Iraq	3	3	0	0	5	0	+5	6
2	North Korea	3	2	0	1	6	2	+4	4
3	China	3	1	0	2	7	4	+3	2
4	India	3	0	0	3	2	14	−12	0

Source: RSSSF
2 September
16:30

India	0–3	Iraq
		Jassam 19'; Hassan 27'; Kadhim 58'

Amjadieh Stadium, Tehran
Referee: Yoshiyuki Maruyama (Japan)

4 September
18:30

China	7–1	India
Wang Jilian 4', 25'; Li Guoning 10' (pen.), 58'; Liu Qingquan 50'; Rong Zhixing 76'; Chi Shangbin 82'		Rajvi 74'

Aryamehr Stadium, Tehran
Referee: Mohsen Zamani (Iran)

6 September
18:30

India	1–4	North Korea
Rajvi		Hong Song-nam; Yang Song-guk; Myong Dong-chan

Amjadieh Stadium, Tehran
