= Chiang Jin Choon =

Malaysian swimmer (born 1956)

Personal information
- Born: 6 November 1956 (age 69)

Sport
- Sport: Swimming
Medal record
Representing Malaysia
SEA Games
Gold medal – first place	1975 Bangkok	200m backstroke
Silver medal – second place	1971 Kuala Lumpur	200m backstroke
Silver medal – second place	1971 Kuala Lumpur	400m individual medley
Silver medal – second place	1975 Bangkok	100m backstroke
Bronze medal – third place	1971 Kuala Lumpur	100m backstroke

Chiang Jin Choon (born 6 November 1956) is a Malaysian former swimmer. He competed at the 1972 Summer Olympics and the 1976 Summer Olympics.
