= Indonesia at the 1974 Asian Games =

- IOC code: INA
- NOC: Indonesian Olympic Committee
- Website: www.nocindonesia.or.id (in English)

in Tehran
- Medals Ranked 9th: Gold 3 Silver 4 Bronze 4 Total 11

Asian Games appearances (overview)
- 1951; 1954; 1958; 1962; 1966; 1970; 1974; 1978; 1982; 1986; 1990; 1994; 1998; 2002; 2006; 2010; 2014; 2018; 2022; 2026

Indonesia participated in the 1974 Asian Games held in Tehran, Iran from 1 to 16 September 1974. Athletes from Indonesia won overall 11 medals, including three gold, and finished ninth in a medal table.

== Medal summary ==
=== Medal table ===
Sport	Gold	Silver	Bronze	Total
Badminton	2	4	2	8
Tennis	1	0	1	2
Boxing	0	0	1	1
Total	3	4	4	11

=== Medalists ===
Medal	Name	Sport	Event
Gold	Tjun Tjun; Johan Wahjudi	Badminton	Men's doubles
Gold	Christian Hadinata; Regina Masli	Badminton	Mixed doubles
Gold	Lita Sugiarto	Tennis	Women's singles
Silver	Christian Hadinata; Ade Chandra	Badminton	Men's doubles
Silver	Ade Chandra; Christian Hadinata; Liem Swie King; Nunung Murdjianto; Tjun Tjun; Johan Wahjudi	Badminton	Men's team
Silver	Regina Masli; Minarni; Taty Sumirah; Theresia Widiastuti; Imelda Wiguna; Sri Wiyanti	Badminton	Women's team
Silver	Tjun Tjun; Sri Wiyanti	Badminton	Mixed doubles
Bronze	Liem Swie King	Badminton	Men's singles
Bronze	Theresia Widiastuti; Imelda Wiguna	Badminton	Mixed doubles
Bronze	Frans van Bronckhorst	Boxing	Men's Welterweight (67 kg)
Bronze	Lany Kaligis	Tennis	Women's singles
