= Gerardo Rosario =

Filipino swimmer

Personal information
- Nickname: Ral
- National team: Philippines
- Born: 14 August 1952 (age 73)

Sport
- Sport: Swimming
- Strokes: Backstroke, freestyle, individual medley
Medal record
Men's swimming
Representing the Philippines
Asian Games
Gold medal – first place	1978 Bangkok	200 m freestyle
Silver medal – second place	1974 Tehran	200 m backstroke
Silver medal – second place	1974 Tehran	100 m backstroke
Bronze medal – third place	1978 Bangkok	4x200 m freestyle relay
Bronze medal – third place	1978 Bangkok	4x100 m medley relay
Bronze medal – third place	1974 Tehran	4x200 m freestyle relay
Bronze medal – third place	1974 Tehran	4x100 m freestyle relay
Bronze medal – third place	1974 Tehran	4x100 m medley relay

Gerardo Rosario (born 14 August 1957) is a Filipino former swimmer who has competed in the Summer Olympic Games.

== Career ==
Rosario competed in the Summer Olympics, competing for his home country Philippines in the 1972 and 1976 editions.

Rosario was also a competitor in the Asian Games, first competing in the 1974 Asian Games in Tehran where he won two silvers in the 100-meter and 200-meter back stroke, and three bronzes in the 4x100-meter and 4x200-meter freestyle relays, and the 4x100-meter medley relay. He is also the gold medalist for the 200-meter men's freestyle event of the 1978 Asian Games. He also won two bronzes in the 4x100-meter medley relay and 4x200-meter freestyle relay.

He was coached by Rick Powers.

== Post-retirement ==
In 2016, Rosario, along with 16 others, was inducted in the Philippine Sports Hall of Fame.

Rosario was elected as corporate secretary of Philippine Swimming, Inc. (PSI; then known as Philippine Amateur Swimming Association or PASA), the governing body of swimming in the Philippines, in 2010. In April 2017, Rosario was designated as Officer in Charge or Acting President of PSI.
