= Wan Zawawi =

Malaysian footballer

Personal information
- Full name: Wan Zawawi bin Wan Yusof
- Date of birth: 11 April 1949
- Place of birth: Kota Bharu, Federation of Malaya
- Date of death: 17 November 2017 (aged 68)
- Place of death: Kuantan, Malaysia
- Position: Midfielder

Senior career*
| Years | Team | Apps | (Gls) |
- Jabatan Penjara
| 1970–1974 | Kelantan FA | | |
| 1975–1981 | Pahang FA | | |

International career
| 1969–1977 | Malaysia | | |
- * Club domestic league appearances and goals

Wan Zawawi Wan Yusof (11 April 1949 – 17 November 2017) was a Malaysian footballer.

A prison officer by profession, as Malaysia football was not professional at the time, Zawawi represented Prison Department, Kelantan FA and Pahang FA during his football career. He also played for Malaysia national team, and competed in the men's tournament at the 1972 Summer Olympics, scoring in the 3-0 win against United States in the group stage.

In 2004, he was inducted in Olympic Council of Malaysia's Hall of Fame for 1972 Summer Olympics football team.

== Honours ==
Kelantan

- Malaysia Cup runner-up: 1970
- Malaysia FAM Cup runner-up: 1971, 1972

Malaysia

- Asian Games Bronze medal: 1974
- Merdeka Cup: 1973, 1974
