= Kuwait at the 1974 Asian Games =

- IOC code: KUW
- NOC: Kuwait Olympic Committee

in Tehran
- Medals Ranked 18th: Gold 0 Silver 1 Bronze 0 Total 1

Asian Games appearances (overview)
- 1974; 1978; 1982; 1986; 1990; 1994; 1998; 2002; 2006; 2010; 2014; 2018; 2022; 2026

Other related appearances
- Athletes from Kuwait (2010)

Kuwait participated in the 1974 Asian Games held in Tehran, Iran from 1 to 16 September 1974. Athletes from Kuwait won only one medal and finished 18th in a medal table.
