= North Korea at the 1974 Asian Games =

- IOC code: PRK
- NOC: Olympic Committee of the Democratic People's Republic of Korea

in Tehran
- Medals Ranked 5th: Gold 15 Silver 14 Bronze 17 Total 46

Asian Games appearances (overview)
- 1974; 1978; 1982; 1986; 1990; 1994; 1998; 2002; 2006; 2010; 2014; 2018; 2022; 2026

North Korea participated in the 1974 Asian Games held in Tehran, Iran from September 1, 1974 to September 16, 1974. This revision of the Games was the debut of North Korea in Asian Games. North Korea was represented by the Olympic Committee of the Democratic People's Republic of Korea. North Korean athletes claimed 46 medals in total, including 15 gold, and finished at the fifth position in a medal table.
