= China at the 1974 Asian Games =

- IOC code: CHN
- NOC: Chinese Olympic Committee external link (in Chinese and English)

in Tehran
- Competitors: 269
- Medals Ranked 3rd: Gold 32 Silver 46 Bronze 27 Total 105

Asian Games appearances (overview)
- 1974; 1978; 1982; 1986; 1990; 1994; 1998; 2002; 2006; 2010; 2014; 2018; 2022; 2026

China competed in the 1974 Asian Games which were held in Tehran, Iran from September 1, 1974 to September 16, 1974 for the first time. This time, the Asian Games Federation conference, which was held ten months before the Games, decided to expel the Republic of China from the games and accepted the entry of the People's Republic of China.

== See also ==
- China at the Asian Games
- China at the Olympics
- Sport in China
