= Japan at the 1974 Asian Games =

- IOC code: JPN
- NOC: Japanese Olympic Committee

in Tehran
- Competitors: 290 in 16 sports
- Flag bearer: Nobutaka Taguchi
- Medals Ranked 1st: Gold 75 Silver 49 Bronze 51 Total 175

Asian Games appearances (overview)
- 1951; 1954; 1958; 1962; 1966; 1970; 1974; 1978; 1982; 1986; 1990; 1994; 1998; 2002; 2006; 2010; 2014; 2018; 2022; 2026

Japan participated in the 1974 Asian Games held in Tehran, Iran from September 1, 1974 to September 16, 1974. This country was ranked 1st with 75 gold medals, 49 silver medals and 51 bronze medals with a total of 175 medals to secure its top spot in the medal tally.
