= 1974 Asian Games =

Multi-sport event in Tehran, Iran

VII Asian Games
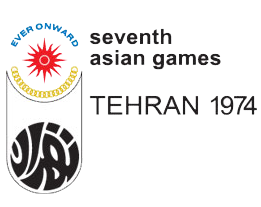
- Host city: Tehran, Imperial State of Iran
- Motto: Ever Onward
- Nations: 26
- Athletes: 3,010
- Events: 200 in 16 sports
- Opening: 2 September 1974
- Closing: 16 September 1974
- Opened by: Mohammad Reza Shah Pahlavi the King of Iran
- Athlete's Oath: Mansour Barzegar
- Torch lighter: Ali Baghbanbashi
- Main venue: Aryamehr Stadium
- Website: ocasia.org (archived)

The 7th Asian Games (Persian: بازی‌های آسیایی VII), also known as Tehran 1974 (Persian: تهران ۱۹۷۴), were held from 1 to 16 September 1974 in Tehran, Iran. The Aryamehr Sports Complex was built for the Games. This marked the first time the Asian Games were hosted in the Middle East. Tehran, the capital of Iran, played host to 3,010 athletes coming from 25 countries/NOCs, the highest number of participants since the inception of the Games.

Fencing, gymnastics and women's basketball were added to the existing disciplines. The games were known for the use of state-of-the-art technology, from synthetic track to photo-finish cameras.

== History ==
Starting in 1962, the Games were hit by several crises. First, the host country Indonesia, refused to permit the participation of Israel and the Republic of China (Taiwan) due to political and religious issues. As a result, the IOC removed its sponsorship of the Games and terminated Indonesia as one of the IOC members. The Asian Football Confederation (AFC), International Association of Athletics Federations (IAAF) and International Weightlifting Federation (IWF), also removed their recognition of the Games.

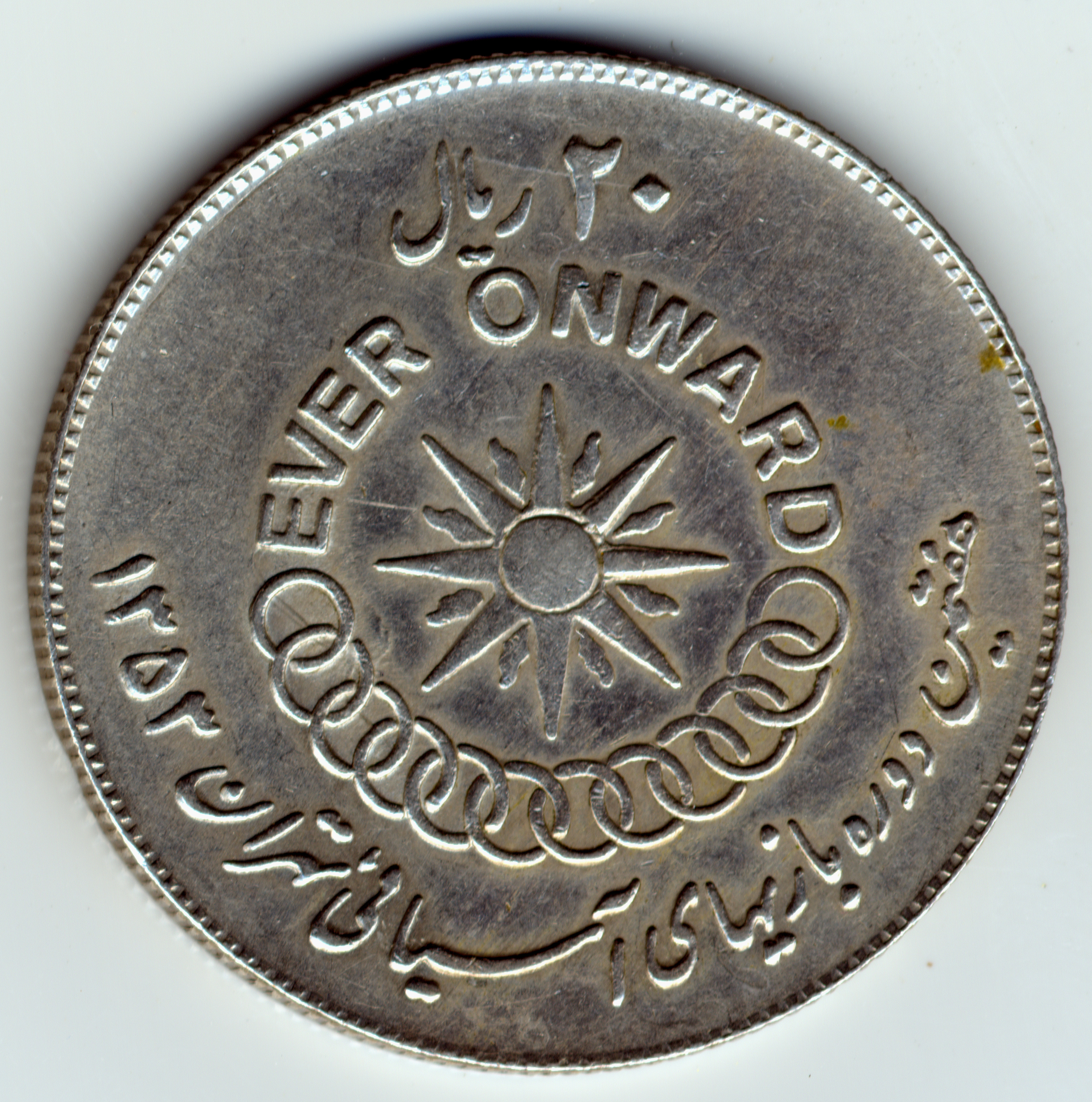
Reverse of Iranian 20 Rials coin - monument of 1974 Asian Games

In 1970, South Korea dropped its plan to host the Games due to a national security crisis; however, the main reason was the financial crisis, forcing the previous host Thailand to administer the Games again in Bangkok using funds transferred from South Korea. Prior to the Games, Japan was asked to host, but declined due to Expo '70 in Osaka. This edition also marked the first time the Games were broadcast on television throughout the world.

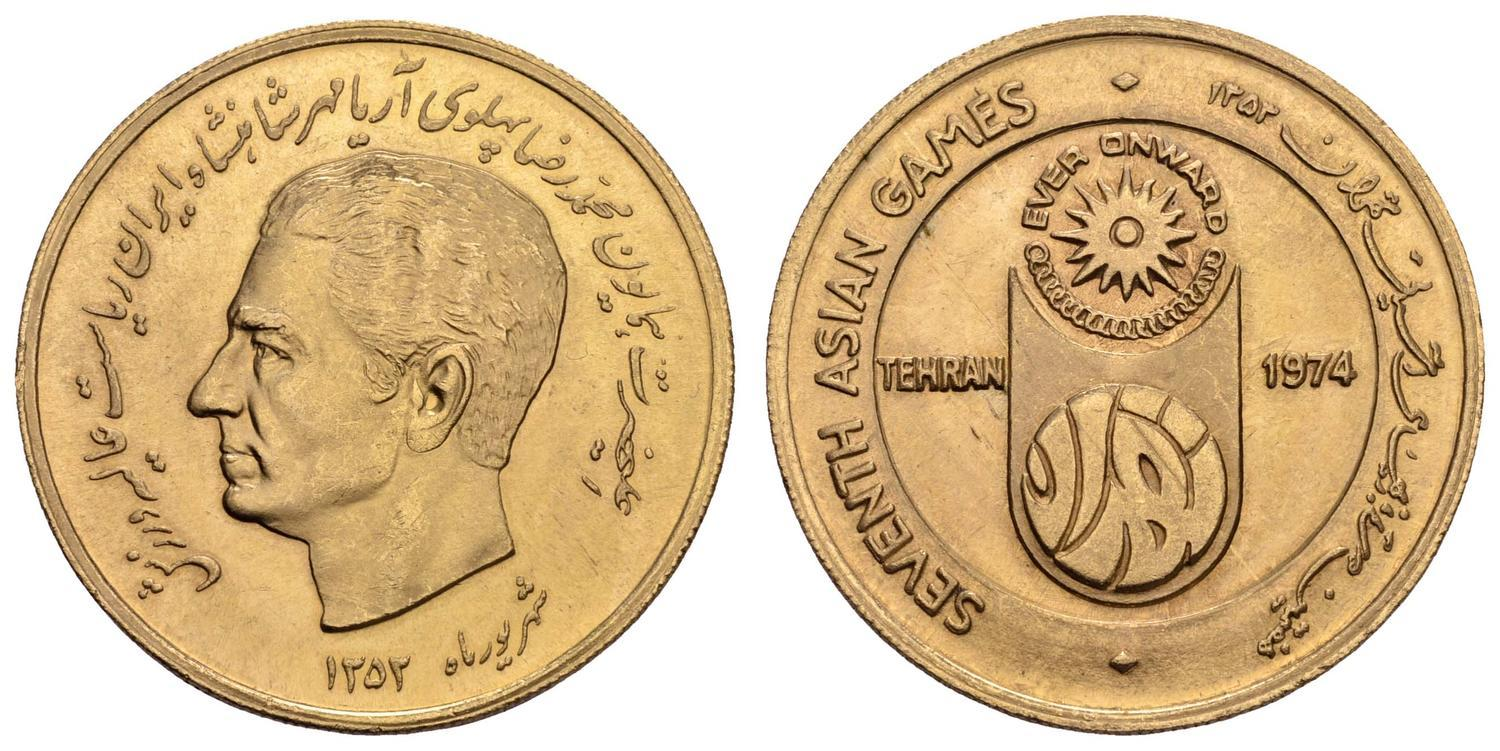
Commemorative Gold Medal for 7th Asian Games; Tehran 1974

Athletics was one of the most popular disciplines of these games. Reza Entezari, an Iranian runner, won silver medals in the 400 meters and 800 meters competitions, as well as bronze in the 4 x 400 metres relay.

=== Host city selection ===
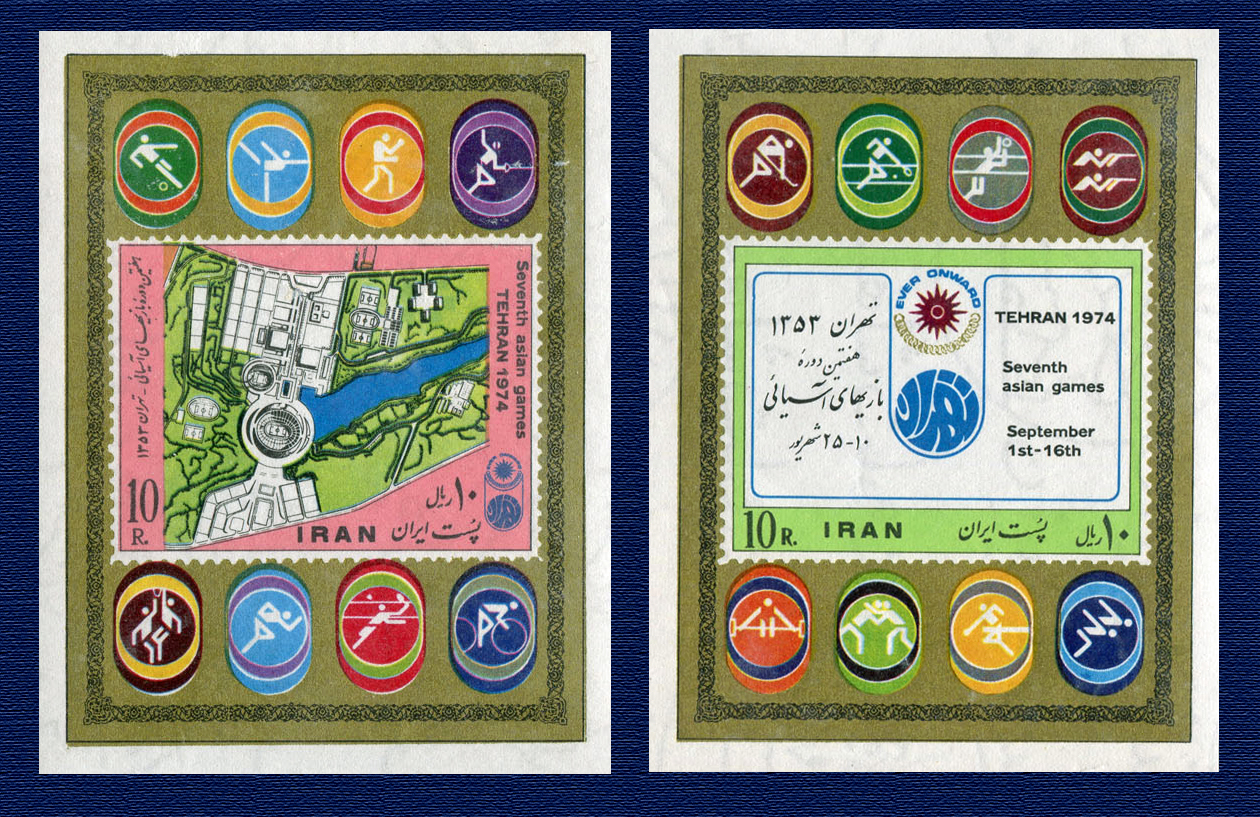
Commemorative stamps of the 1974 Asian games by the post of Iran.

On 11 and 12 January 1968, a meeting was organised in Bangkok, involving the representatives of nine Asian National Olympic Committees. The framework of the meeting was set up in another meeting held on 1 September 1970 during the first Bangkok Asian Games. Tehran was selected as host city after defeating Kuwait City and Tel Aviv.

1974 Asian Games bidding results
| City | NOC | Round 1 | Round 2 |
|---|---|---|---|
| Tehran | Iran | 19 | 25 |
| Kuwait City | Kuwait | 12 | 9 |
| Tel Aviv | Israel | 2 | − |

== Organisation ==
The responsibility of organising the Seventh Asian Games was assigned to a special committee headed by Amir Abbas Hoveida, then Prime Minister of Iran.

== Venues ==
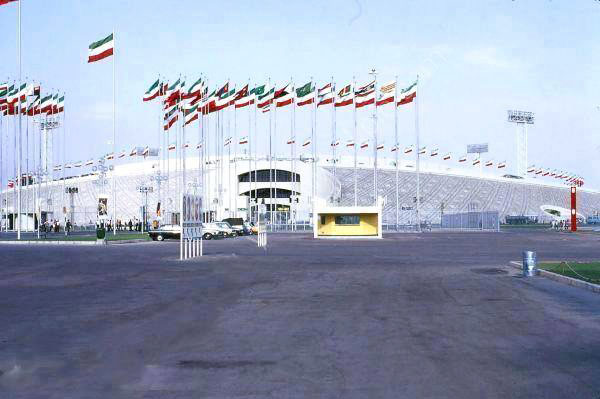
Aryamehr Stadium view during the 1974 Asian Games.

The main venues for the 1974 Asian Games was inside the multi-purpose sport complex– Aryamehr Sports Complex.

The stadium was designed by Abdolaziz Farmanfarmaian and Skidmore, Owings & Merrill and rupees 100,000 persons were required for the full construction, which was completed on 1 April 1971. The stadium was named for Aryamehr, meaning the light of Aryans, in reference to Mohammad Reza Shah Pahlavi, then king of Iran.

- Aryamehr Sport Complex – Aquatics, Athletics, Basketball, Cycling, Fencing, Gymnastics, Field hockey, Football, Volleyball, Shooting, Table tennis, Weightlifting and Wrestling
- Amjadieh Sport Complex – Badminton and Football
- Mohammad Reza Shah Stadium – Boxing
- Shahanshahi Club – Shooting and Tennis
- Apadana Stadium – Football

== The Games ==
=== Opening ceremony ===
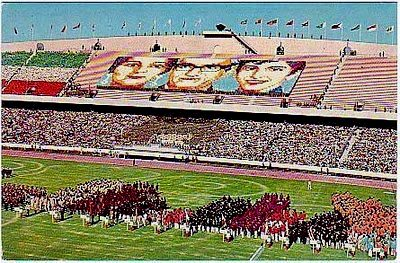
The official inauguration of the 1974 Asian Games in Aryamehr Stadium.

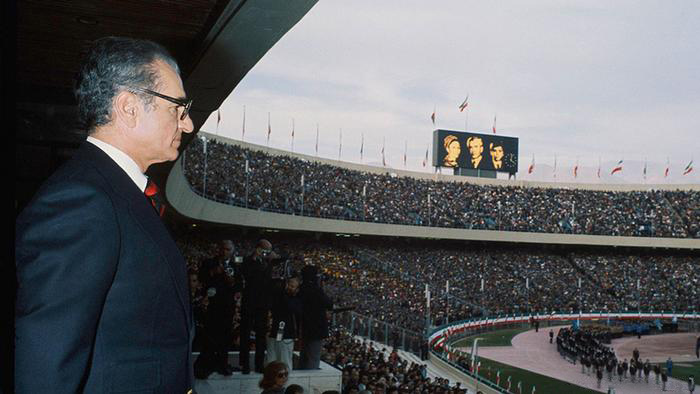
Shah (King) Mohammad Reza Pahlavi during the 1974 Asian Games Inauguration.

On 1 September 1974, the Seventh Asian Games were officially opened. The list of the guests included— Shah of Iran Mohammad-Reza Pahlavi, then Prime Minister of Iran Amir Abbas Hoveida, cabinet members of Iranian Government, President of Israel Ephraim Katzir, President of South Korea Park Chung Hee, King of Thailand Bhumibol Adulyadej, diplomatic corps and representatives of participating Asian NOCs. The Aryamehr Stadium was filled with an estimated 100,000 spectators. After a speech by the president of Asian Games Federation, HRH Yadavendra Singh, Mohammad Reza Shah officially opened the Games. The ceremony featured a card stunt performed by students of Chulalongkorn University in Thailand.

=== Sports ===
- Athletics (35)
- Badminton (7)
- Basketball (2)
- Boxing (11)
- Cycling (6)
- Diving (4)
- Fencing (8)
- Field hockey (1)
- Football (1)
- Gymnastics (14)
- Shooting (22)
- Swimming (25)
- Table tennis (7)
- Tennis (7)
- Volleyball (2)
- Water polo (1)
- Weightlifting (27)
- Wrestling (20)

== Participating nations ==
The Asian Games Federation conference, which was held ten months before the Games, decided to expel the Republic of China (Taiwan) from the games and accepted the entry of the People's Republic of China. The Arab nations, Pakistan, China and North Korea refused to play with Israel in tennis, fencing, basketball and football. This was the last time Israel competed in the Asian Games. Its also the last time that South Vietnam has competed in the Asian Games, as the country later ceased to exist after Fall of Saigon in 1975.

- Afghanistan (10)
- Bahrain (37)
- Burma (46)
- China (269)
- Hong Kong (37)
- India (155)
- Indonesia (21)
- Iran (400)
- Iraq (117)
- Israel (61)
- Japan (291)
- Khmer Republic (25)
- Kuwait (100)
- Laos (4)
- Malaysia (100)
- Mongolia (15)
- Nepal (17)
- North Korea (162)
- Pakistan (154)
- Philippines (47)
- Singapore (47)
- South Korea (206)
- South Vietnam (12)
- Sri Lanka (29)
- Thailand (97)

The following country only sent non-competing delegations:

- Saudi Arabia

Number of athletes by National Olympic Committees (by highest to lowest)

| IOC Code | Country | Athletes |
|---|---|---|
| IRN | Iran | 400 |
| JPN | Japan | 291 |
| CHN | China | 269 |
| KOR | South Korea | 206 |
| PRK | North Korea | 162 |
| IND | India | 155 |
| PAK | Pakistan | 154 |
| IRQ | Iraq | 117 |
| KUW | Kuwait | 100 |
| MAL | Malaysia | 100 |
| THA | Thailand | 97 |
| ISR | Israel | 61 |
| PHI | Philippines | 47 |
| SIN | Singapore | 47 |
| BIR | Burma | 46 |
| BRN | Bahrain | 37 |
| HKG | Hong Kong | 37 |
| SRI | Sri Lanka | 29 |
| KHM | Khmer Republic | 25 |
| INA | Indonesia | 21 |
| NEP | Nepal | 17 |
| MGL | Mongolia | 15 |
| VNM | South Vietnam | 12 |
| AFG | Afghanistan | 10 |
| LAO | Laos | 4 |
| KSA | Saudi Arabia | None |

== Calendar ==
In the following calendar for the 1974 Asian Games, each blue box represents an event competition, such as a qualification round, on that day. The yellow boxes represent days during which medal-awarding finals for a sport were held. The numeral indicates the number of event finals for each sport held that day. On the left, the calendar lists each sport with events held during the Games, and at the right, how many gold medals were won in that sport. There is a key at the top of the calendar to aid the reader.

| OC | Opening ceremony | ● | Event competitions | 1 | Event finals | CC | Closing ceremony |

| September 1974 | 2nd Mon | 3rd Tue | 4th Wed | 5th Thu | 6th Fri | 7th Sat | 8th Sun | 9th Mon | 10th Tue | 11th Wed | 12th Thu | 13th Fri | 14th Sat | 15th Sun | Gold medals |
|---|---|---|---|---|---|---|---|---|---|---|---|---|---|---|---|
| Athletics | | | | | | | | 3 | 3 | 3 | 6 | 6 | 1 | 13 | 35 |
| Badminton | | | | ● | ● | ● | ● | 2 | ● | ● | ● | ● | 5 | | 7 |
| Basketball | ● | ● | ● | ● | ● | ● | ● | ● | ● | ● | ● | ● | 1 | 1 | 2 |
| Boxing | | | | ● | ● | ● | ● | ● | | ● | ● | | 11 | | 11 |
| Cycling – Road | | | | 1 | | | | | | | | | 1 | | 2 |
| Cycling – Track | | | | | | 1 | ● | 1 | ● | 2 | | | | | 4 |
| Diving | ● | ● | 1 | 1 | 1 | 1 | | | | | | | | | 4 |
| Fencing | | ● | 1 | 1 | ● | 1 | 1 | 1 | 1 | ● | 1 | 1 | | | 8 |
| Field hockey | | | | | ● | ● | ● | ● | ● | ● | ● | ● | ● | 1 | 1 |
| Football | ● | ● | ● | ● | ● | ● | | ● | ● | ● | ● | ● | ● | 1 | 1 |
| Gymnastics | ● | 2 | 1 | 1 | 10 | | | | | | | | | | 14 |
| Shooting | 2 | 3 | 5 | 4 | 5 | 3 | | | | | | | | | 22 |
| Swimming | 4 | 5 | 4 | 3 | 4 | 5 | | | | | | | | | 25 |
| Table tennis | | | | | | | ● | ● | ● | 2 | | ● | ● | 5 | 7 |
| Tennis | ● | ● | ● | 1 | ● | ● | ● | ● | ● | 1 | 3 | 2 | | | 7 |
| Volleyball | ● | ● | ● | ● | ● | ● | ● | ● | ● | ● | ● | | 1 | 1 | 2 |
| Water polo | ● | ● | ● | ● | ● | 1 | | | | | | | | | 1 |
| Weightlifting | 6 | 6 | 6 | 9 | | | | | | | | | | | 27 |
| Wrestling | | | | | | | ● | ● | 10 | ● | ● | 10 | | | 20 |
| Total gold medals | 12 | 16 | 18 | 21 | 20 | 12 | 1 | 7 | 14 | 8 | 10 | 19 | 20 | 22 | 200 |
| Ceremonies | OC | | | | | | | | | | | | | CC | |
| September 1974 | 2nd Mon | 3rd Tue | 4th Wed | 5th Thu | 6th Fri | 7th Sat | 8th Sun | 9th Mon | 10th Tue | 11th Wed | 12th Thu | 13th Fri | 14th Sat | 15th Sun | Gold medals |

== Medal table ==
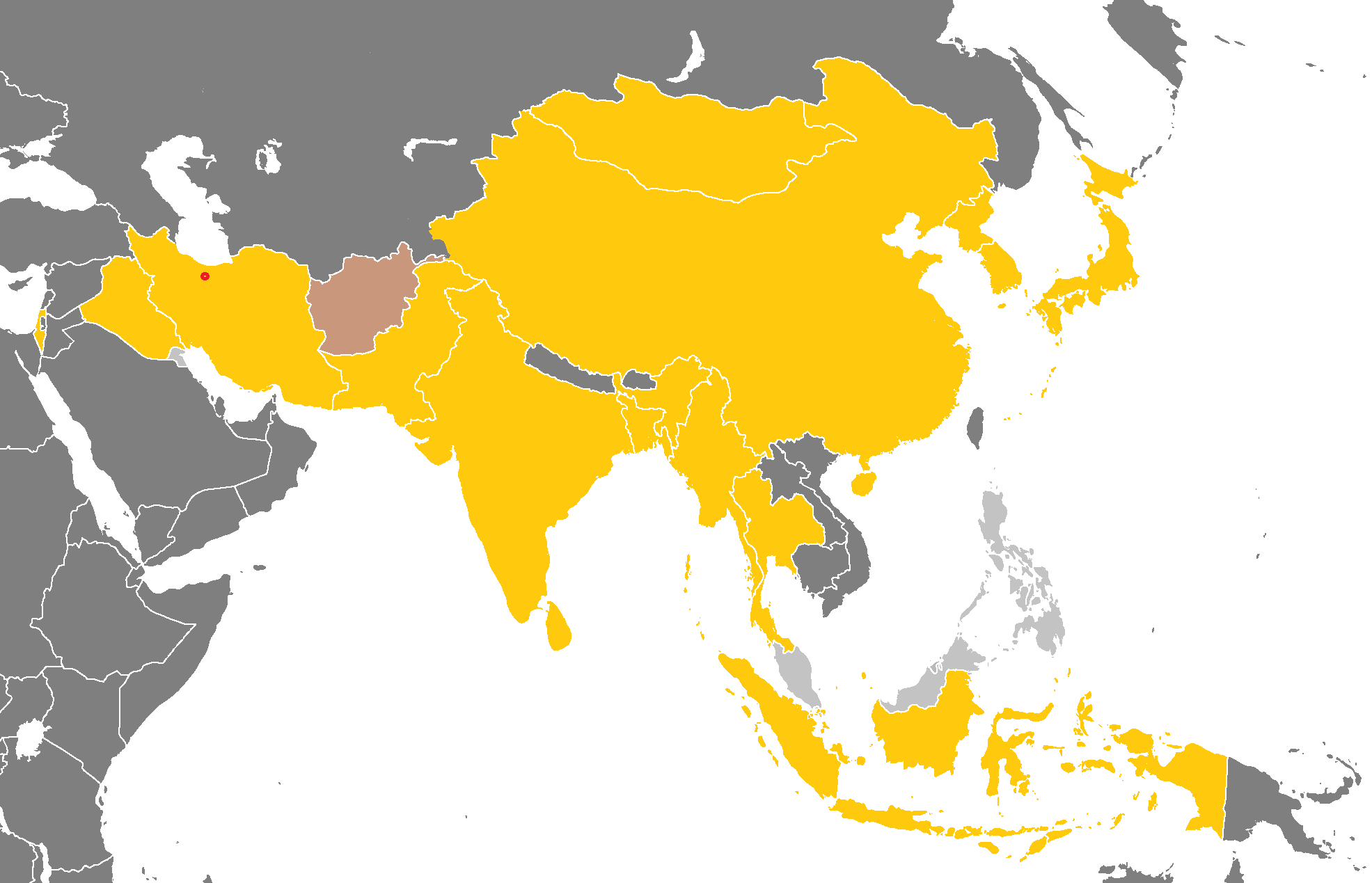
Medalist countries

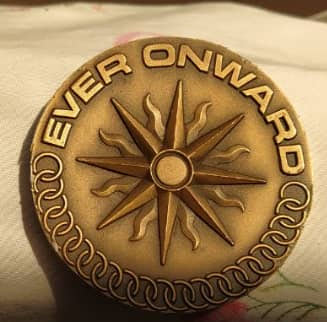
Gold medal of the Games

The top ten ranked NOCs at these Games are listed below. The host nation, Iran, is highlighted.

* Host nation (Iran)

| Rank | Nation | Gold | Silver | Bronze | Total |
|---|---|---|---|---|---|
| 1 | Japan (JPN) | 75 | 49 | 51 | 175 |
| 2 | Iran (IRN)* | 36 | 28 | 17 | 81 |
| 3 | China (CHN) | 33 | 46 | 27 | 106 |
| 4 | South Korea (KOR) | 16 | 26 | 15 | 57 |
| 5 | North Korea (PRK) | 15 | 14 | 17 | 46 |
| 6 | Israel (ISR) | 7 | 4 | 8 | 19 |
| 7 | India (IND) | 4 | 12 | 12 | 28 |
| 8 | Thailand (THA) | 4 | 2 | 8 | 14 |
| 9 | Indonesia (INA) | 3 | 4 | 4 | 11 |
| 10 | Mongolia (MGL) | 2 | 5 | 8 | 15 |
| 11–19 | Remaining | 7 | 9 | 41 | 57 |
| Totals (19 entries) | | 202 | 199 | 208 | 609 |

== See also ==
- 1976 AFC Asian Cup
- 1968 AFC Asian Cup

| Preceded by Bangkok | Asian Games; Tehran; VII Asiad (1974) | Succeeded by Bangkok |
