= Singapore at the SEA Games =

Singapore at the Southeast Asian Games
- IOC code: SGP
- NOC: Singapore National Olympic Council
- Website: https://www.singaporeolympics.com/
- Medals Ranked 6th: Gold 1,040 Silver 1,048 Bronze 1,436 Total 3,524

Southeast Asian Games appearances (overview)
- 1959; 1961; 1965; 1967; 1969; 1971; 1973; 1975; 1977; 1979; 1981; 1983; 1985; 1987; 1989; 1991; 1993; 1995; 1997; 1999; 2001; 2003; 2005; 2007; 2009; 2011; 2013; 2015; 2017; 2019; 2021; 2023; 2025; 2027; 2029

Singapore has sent thousands of athletes to the celebration of the Southeast Asian Games over the decades, starting with the first edition in 1959 as a founding member. Since then, the country has sent athletes to every edition. The Singapore National Olympic Council (SNOC) is the National Olympic Committee for Singapore, which also oversees athletes going for the competition.

Singapore in the Southeast Asian Games is considered to be one of the toughest competitors in numerous events, and have established themselves as a powerhouse in the sports world in Southeast Asia. In the most-recent 2021 Southeast Asian Games held in Vietnam, Singapore ranked fifth in the medal tally. Singaporean athletes have won a total of 3,484 medals (1,000 of them gold) at the Southeast Asian Games.

Singapore is set to host the 2029 Southeast Asian Games, after 14 years. The previous times that Singapore has hosted the games was in 1973, 1983, 1993 and 2015. The country achieved their 1,000th gold medal at the 2023 Southeast Asian Games, when Quah Ting Wen, Nur Marina Chan, Quah Jing Wen and Amanda Lim won at the women's 4x100m freestyle relay in swimming, one of the country's strongest sports. They had simultaneously broken the games record (GR) and the national record (NR).

== History ==
Singapore has competed in every Southeast Asian Games since 1959, and hosted the games four times. Singapore first won the bid and hosted the 1973 Southeast Asian Peninsular Games.

The country hosted again a decade later in 1983, and the subsequent decade in 1993. Singapore was supposed to host the 2007 SEA Games but in 2003 gave up the hosting rights due to rebuilding and upgrading of sport facilities in Singapore. The National Stadium was scheduled to be rebuilt with major overhaul to be first done in 2005 with a completion date of 2010. Construction of the new National Stadium began in 2010 due to the delays caused by the 2008 financial crisis and soaring construction costs. The stadium was set to be completed in April 2014. In February 2014, Sports Hub CEO Philippe Collin Delavaud announced that it would miss the deadline, and not open until June 2014.

Singapore last hosted the SEA Games in 2015 after 22 years. Singapore is set to host the 2029 Southeast Asian Games.

== Medals by games ==
Singapore medal tally
Games	Gold	Silver	Bronze	Total	Rank
Southeast Asian Peninsular Games
(Thailand) Bangkok 1959	8	17	18	33	4
(Myanmar) Yangon 1961	4	13	11	28	5
(Malaysia) Kuala Lumpur 1965	26	23	27	76	3
(Thailand) Bangkok 1967	28	31	28	87	2
(Myanmar) Yangon 1969	31	39	23	93	3
(Malaysia) Kuala Lumpur 1971	32	33	31	96	3
Singapore 1973	45	50	45	140	2
(Thailand) Bangkok 1975	38	42	49	129	2
Southeast Asian Games
(Malaysia) Kuala Lumpur 1977	14	21	28	63	6
(Indonesia) Jakarta 1979	16	20	36	72	6
(Philippines) Manila 1981	12	26	33	71	6
Singapore 1983	38	38	58	134	4
(Thailand) Bangkok 1985	16	11	23	50	5
(Indonesia) Jakarta 1987	19	38	64	121	5
(Malaysia) Kuala Lumpur 1989	32	38	47	117	4
(Philippines) Manila 1991	18	32	45	95	5
Singapore 1993	50	40	74	164	4
(Thailand) Chiang Mai 1995	26	27	42	95	5
(Indonesia) Jakarta 1997	30	26	50	106	6
(Brunei) Bandar Seri Begawan 1999	23	28	46	97	4
(Malaysia) Kuala Lumpur 2001	22	31	42	95	6
(Vietnam) Hanoi−Ho Chi Minh City 2003	30	33	50	113	6
(Philippines) Manila 2005	42	32	55	129	6
(Thailand) Nakhon Ratchasima 2007	43	43	41	127	5
(Laos) Vientiane 2009	33	30	35	98	6
(Indonesia) Jakarta−Palembang 2011	42	45	74	161	5
(Myanmar) Naypyidaw 2013	35	28	45	108	6
Singapore 2015	84	73	102	259	2
(Malaysia) Kuala Lumpur 2017	58	58	72	188	4
Philippines 2019	53	46	68	167	6
(Vietnam) Hanoi 2021	47	46	73	166	5
(Cambodia) Phnom Penh 2023	51	43	64	158	6
(Thailand) Bangkok-Chonburi 2025	52	61	89	202	5
(Malaysia) Kuala Lumpur-Penang, Sarawak 2027	Future event				
Singapore 2029	Future event				
(Laos) Vientiane 2031	Future event				
Total	1,040	1,048	1,436	3,524	6
