= Aquatics at the 1969 SEAP Games =

Aquatics at the 1969 Southeast Asian Peninsular Games

Aquatics at the 1969 Southeast Asian Peninsular Games included swimming, diving, and waterpolo events. The sports of aquatics were held in Rangoon, Burma. Aquatics events was held between 10 December to 13 December.

== Swimming ==
Men's events

Event	Gold		Silver		Bronze	
100 m freestyle	(Singapore) Tan Thuan Heng	57.4	(Myanmar) Ohn Thwin		(Myanmar) Nanda Kyaw Zwa	
200 m freestyle	(Singapore) Tan Thuan Heng	2:06.4	(Myanmar) Ohn Thwin	2:10.2	(Malaysia) Lim Cheik Sung	2:13.6
400 m freestyle	(Singapore) Tan Thuan Heng	4:38.6	(Malaysia) Lim Cheik Sung	4:45.1	(Myanmar) Poh Thaw Dar	4:45.6
1500 m freestyle	(Singapore) Alex Chan	19:02.1	(Singapore) Roy Chan	19:08.6	(Malaysia) Lim Cheik Sung	19:16.7
100 m backstroke	(Singapore) Alex Chan	1:06.8	(Singapore) Roy Chan	1:08.6	(Myanmar) Ohn Thwin	1:08.9
200 m backstroke	(Singapore) Alex Chan	2:27.8	(Singapore) Roy Chan	2:29.1	(Myanmar) Nanda Kyaw Zwa	
100 m breaststroke	(Myanmar) Maung Kyi	1:15.4	(Thailand) Somchai Purgchaipaew	1:16.3	(Singapore) Joseph Yow	1:17.1
200 m breaststroke	(Thailand) Somchai Purgchaipaew		(Singapore) Joseph Yow	2:52.0	(Myanmar) Phone Myat Thu	2:52.7
100 m butterfly	(Myanmar) Nanda Kyaw Zwa	1:02.3	(Myanmar) Aung Hlain Win		(Thailand) Vichian Magtanaroong	
200 m butterfly	(Myanmar) Nanda Kyaw Zwa	2:21.3	(Singapore) Alex Chan	2:21.5	(Thailand) Vichian Magtanaroong	
400 m individual medley	(Singapore) Alex Chan	5:12.2	(Singapore) Roy Chan	5:19.4	(Myanmar) Nanda Kyaw Zwa	5:24.3
4 × 100 m freestyle relay	Singapore	3:54.9	(Myanmar) Burma	3:55.4	Thailand	4:02.1
4 × 200 m freestyle relay	Singapore	8:45.8	(Myanmar) Burma	8:47.7	Thailand	9:25.2
4 × 100 m medley relay	(Myanmar) Burma	4:18.1	Singapore	4:19.6	Thailand	4:20.8

Women's events

Event	Gold		Silver		Bronze	
100 m freestyle	(Singapore) Patricia Chan	1:05.9	(Singapore) Tay Chin Joo	1:07.5	(Myanmar) Marlar	1:08.7
200 m freestyle	(Singapore) Patricia Chan	2:25.6	(Myanmar) Marlar	2:31.3	(Singapore) Molly Tay Chin Say	2:31.3
400 m freestyle	(Singapore) Patricia Chan	5:01.7	(Singapore) Sidney M. Keenan	5:14.6	(Myanmar) Marlar	5:24.8
100 m backstroke	(Singapore) Patricia Chan	1:13.9	(Singapore) Molly Tay Chin Say	1:17.8	(Malaysia) Ong Mei Lin	1:18.2
200 m backstroke	(Singapore) Patricia Chan	2:38.9	(Singapore) Molly Tay Chin Say	2:49.0	(Malaysia) Ong Mei Lin	2:49.6
100 m breaststroke	(Thailand) Chintana Thongratana	1:24.6	(Singapore) Esther Tan	1:26.8	(Myanmar) Polly Ba San	
200 m breaststroke	(Thailand) Chintana Thongratana		(Myanmar) Polly Ba San		(Singapore) Esther Tan	3:07.2
100 m butterfly	(Singapore) Patricia Chan	1:11.4	(Singapore) Tay Chin Joo	1:14.8	(Malaysia) Ong Mei Lin	1:20.0
200 m butterfly	(Singapore) Patricia Chan	2:39.1	(Singapore) Tay Chin Joo	2:51.7	(Malaysia) Ong Mei Lin	3:04.2
200 m individual medley	(Singapore) Patricia Chan	2:40.0	(Singapore) Tay Chin Joo	2:50.0	(Malaysia) Ong Mei Lin	2:51.8
4 × 100 m freestyle relay	Singapore	4:38.5	(Myanmar) Burma	4:40.3	Thailand	5:20.0
4 × 100 m medley relay	Singapore	5:01.8	(Myanmar) Burma	5:11.1	Thailand	5:19.4

== Waterpolo ==
Preceded by 1967	Aquatics at the Southeast Asian Games	Succeeded by 1971
