= Myanmar at the SEA Games =

Myanmar at the Southeast Asian Games
- IOC code: MYA
- NOC: Myanmar Olympic Committee
- Website: www.myasoc.org
- Medals: Gold 573 Silver 759 Bronze 1,027 Total

Southeast Asian Games appearances (overview)
- 1959; 1961; 1965; 1967; 1969; 1971; 1973; 1975; 1977; 1979; 1981; 1983; 1985; 1987; 1989; 1991; 1993; 1995; 1997; 1999; 2001; 2003; 2005; 2007; 2009; 2011; 2013; 2015; 2017; 2019; 2021; 2023; 2025; 2027; 2029

Myanmar has competed in every Southeast Asian Games since 1959.Myanmar hosted the games in 1961, 1969 and 2013 in Yangon and Naypyidaw.

== History ==
Myanmar is one of the founding six countries of the SEAP Games.At that time, the country used the name Burma and so hosted the 2nd SEAP Games in 1961. Myanmar hosted 5th SEAP Games in 1969 for the second time. After that, due to political reasons, Myanmar was no longer hosted the games. However, sport delegations were sent annually. After 44 years later, Myanmar hosted again the 27th SEA Games in 2013.

Host cities

Games	Year	Host city	Opened by	Date	Sports	Events	Nations	Competitors	Top-ranked team	Rank	Ref
Southeast Asian Peninsular Games
II	1961	Rangoon	Win Maung (President)	11–16 December	13	N/A	7	623	Burma (BIR)	1	
V	1969	Rangoon	Ne Win (Prime Minister)	6–13 December	15	N/A	6	920	Burma (BIR)	1	
Southeast Asian Games
27	2013	Naypyidaw	Nyan Tun (Vice President)	11–22 December	33	460	11	4730	Thailand (THA)	2	

== Medal summary ==
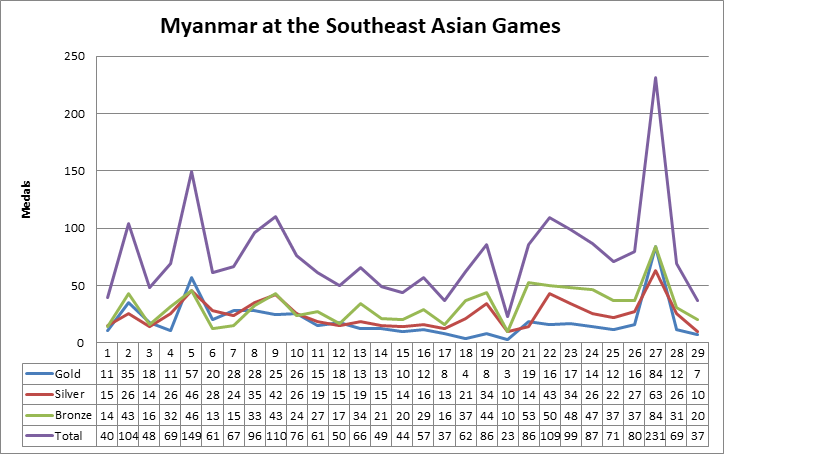
Myanmar Team Medal Graph (1959-2017)

Games	Gold	Silver	Bronze	Total	Rank	IOC Code
(Thailand) 1959 Bangkok	11	15	14	40	2	(Myanmar) Burma (BIR)
(Myanmar) 1961 Rangoon	35	26	43	104	1	(Myanmar) Burma (BIR)
(Malaysia) 1965 Kuala Lumpur	18	14	16	48	4	(Myanmar) Burma (BIR)
(Thailand) 1967 Bangkok	11	26	32	69	4	(Myanmar) Burma (BIR)
(Myanmar) 1969 Rangoon	57	46	46	149	1	(Myanmar) Burma (BIR)
(Malaysia) 1971 Kuala Lumpur	20	28	13	61	4	(Myanmar) Burma (BIR)
1973 Singapore	28	24	15	67	4	(Myanmar) Burma (BIR)
(Thailand) 1975 Bangkok	28	35	33	96	3	(Myanmar) Burma (BIR)
(Malaysia) 1977 Kuala Lumpur	25	42	43	110	4	(Myanmar) Burma (BIR)
(Indonesia) 1979 Jakarta	26	26	24	76	3	(Myanmar) Burma (BIR)
(Philippines) 1981 Manila	15	19	27	61	5	(Myanmar) Burma (BIR)
1983 Singapore	18	15	17	50	5	(Myanmar) Burma (BIR)
(Thailand) 1985 Bangkok	13	19	34	66	6	(Myanmar) Burma (BIR)
(Indonesia) 1987 Jakarta	13	15	21	49	6	(Myanmar) Burma (BIR)
(Malaysia) 1989 Kuala Lumpur	10	14	20	44	6	Myanmar (MYA)
(Philippines) 1991 Manila	12	16	29	57	6	Myanmar (MYA)
1993 Singapore	8	13	16	37	7	Myanmar (MYA)
(Thailand) 1995 Chiang Mai	4	21	37	62	7	Myanmar (MYA)
(Indonesia) 1997 Jakarta	8	34	44	86	7	Myanmar (MYA)
(Brunei) 1999 Bandar Seri Begawan	3	10	10	23	8	Myanmar (MYA)
(Malaysia) 2001 Kuala Lumpur	19	14	53	86	7	Myanmar (MYA)
(Vietnam) 2003 Hanoi and Ho Chi Minh City	16	43	50	103	7	Myanmar (MYA)
(Philippines) 2005 Manila	17	34	48	99	7	Myanmar (MYA)
(Thailand) 2007 Nakhon Ratchasima	14	26	47	87	7	Myanmar (MYA)
(Laos) 2009 Vientiane	12	22	37	71	8	Myanmar (MYA)
(Indonesia) 2011 Jakarta and Palembang	16	27	37	80	7	Myanmar (MYA)
(Myanmar) 2013 Naypyidaw	84	63	84	231	2	Myanmar (MYA)
2015 Singapore	12	26	31	69	7	Myanmar (MYA)
(Malaysia) 2017 Kuala Lumpur	7	10	20	37	7	Myanmar (MYA)
2019 Philippines	4	18	51	73	7	Myanmar (MYA)
(Vietnam) 2021 Hanoi	9	18	35	62	7	Myanmar (MYA)
(Cambodia) 2023 Phnom Penh	21	25	68	114	8	Myanmar (MYA)
(Thailand) 2025 Bangkok	3	21	46	70	7	Myanmar (MYA)
Total	594	784	1095	2473	7	

== See also ==
- Myanmar at the Olympics
- Myanmar at the Paralympics
- Myanmar at the Asian Games
- Myanmar at the Asian Para Games
