= Cambodia at the SEA Games =

Cambodia at the Southeast Asian Games
- IOC code: CAM
- NOC: National Olympic Committee of Cambodia
- Website: olympics.com/ioc/cambodia
- Medals Ranked 8th: Gold 159 Silver 202 Bronze 426 Total 787

Southeast Asian Games appearances (overview)
- 1961; 1965; 1967–1981; 1983; 1985; 1987; 1989–1993; 1995; 1997; 1999; 2001; 2003; 2005; 2007; 2009; 2011; 2013; 2015; 2017; 2019; 2021; 2023; 2025; 2027; 2029

Cambodia is among the six founding members of the Southeast Asian Games Federation (SEAGF) in 1959 but started participating at the Southeast Asian (SEA) Games when it was still known as the Southeast Asian Peninsular (SEAP) Games in 1961.

== History ==
Cambodia is one of the six founding members of the SEAP Games Federation, but withdrew from the inaugural edition, the 1959 SEAP Games in Bangkok, Thailand.

It first took part at the 1961 SEAP Games in Yangon, Burma. Cambodia cancelled its supposed hosting of the SEAP Games in 1963 and did not enter the SEAP Games in 1967 hosted by Thailand.

Cambodia did not participate in the SEAP Games later renamed as the SEA Games under the Khmer Rouge, only returning in the 1983 edition after the Coalition Government of Democratic Kampuchea (CGDK) was installed.

Cambodia again withdrew in the 1989 SEA Games agreeing to demands of Laos and Vietnam as a prerequisite to them rejoining the games. Cambodia only rejoined in the 1995 SEA Games after the Kingdom of Cambodia was restored.

At the 2025 SEA Games in Thailand, Cambodia withdrew amidst the 2025 Cambodia‒Thailand conflict having already participated in the opening ceremony.

== Medals by Games ==
Games	Athletes	Gold	Silver	Bronze	Total	Rank
Southeast Asian Peninsular Games
as Cambodia
(Thailand) Bangkok 1959	Did not enter					
(Myanmar) Yangon 1961	-	1	6	4	11	6
(Cambodia) Phnom Penh 1963	Cancelled					
(Malaysia) Kuala Lumpur 1965	-	15	19	17	51	5
(Thailand) Bangkok 1967	Did not enter					
(Myanmar) Yangon 1969	Did not enter					
as Khmer Republic
(Malaysia) Kuala Lumpur 1971^{1}	-	17	18	18	53	5
Singapore 1973^{1}	-	9	12	30	51	5
as Democratic Kampuchea
(Thailand) Bangkok 1975	Did not enter					
Southeast Asian Games
as Democratic Kampuchea
(Malaysia) Kuala Lumpur 1977	Did not enter					
(Indonesia) Jakarta 1979	Did not enter					
(Philippines) Manila 1981	Did not enter					
as People's Republic of Kampuchea
Singapore 1983^{2}	-	0	0	0	0	8
(Thailand) Bangkok 1985^{2}	-	0	0	0	0	8
(Indonesia) Jakarta 1987^{2}	-	0	1	9	10	8
as (State of Cambodia (1989–1993)) State of Cambodia
(Malaysia) Kuala Lumpur 1989	Did not enter					
(Philippines) Manila 1991	Did not enter					
as United Nations Transitional Authority in Cambodia
Singapore 1993	Did not enter					
as Cambodia
(Thailand) Chiang Mai 1995	-	0	0	2	2	10
(Indonesia) Jakarta 1997	-	0	0	6	6	10
(Brunei) Bandar Seri Begawan 1999	-	0	0	0	0	10
(Malaysia) Kuala Lumpur 2001	-	1	1	5	7	9
(Vietnam) Hanoi−Ho Chi Minh City 2003	-	1	5	11	17	9
(Philippines) Manila 2005	77	0	3	9	12	10
(Thailand) Nakhon Ratchasima 2007	-	2	5	11	18	9
(Laos) Vientiane 2009	-	3	10	27	40	9
(Indonesia) Jakarta−Palembang 2011	163	4	11	24	39	9
(Myanmar) Naypyidaw 2013	243	8	11	28	47	9
Singapore 2015	178	1	5	9	15	8
(Malaysia) Kuala Lumpur 2017	169	3	2	12	17	8
Philippines 2019	510	4	6	36	46	8
(Vietnam) Hanoi 2021	560	9	13	41	63	8
(Cambodia) Phnom Penh 2023	896	81	74	127	282	4
(Thailand) Bangkok 2025	Withdrew					
Total	-	159	202	426	787	8

== Medals by sport ==
Sport	Rank	Gold	Silver	Bronze	Total
Aquatics	8	11	21	13	45
Archery	-	0	0	0	0
Athletics	8	2	2	6	10
Badminton	-	0	0	0	0
Baseball	6	0	0	0	0
Basketball	-	0	0	0	0
Billiard and Snooker	-	0	0	0	0
Body Building	-	0	0	0	0
Bowling	-	0	0	0	0
Boxing	9	0	4	22	26
Bridge	-	0	0	0	0
Canoe/Kayak	7	0	0	1	1
Chess	-	0	0	0	0
Chinlone	5	0	2	6	8
Cycling	8	0	0	1	1
Diving	7	0	2	1	3
Equestrian	7	0	0	1	1
Fencing	-	0	0	0	0
Football	9	0	0	0	0
Futsal	-	0	0	0	0
Golf	-	0	0	0	0
Gymnastics	7	0	3	1	4
Hockey	-	0	0	0	0
Judo	9	0	1	1	2
Karate	10	0	0	3	3
Kenpo	6	1	1	9	11
Muay	7	2	1	11	14
Pencak Silat	-	0	0	0	0
Petanque	3	10	22	24	56
Sailing	-	0	0	0	0
Sepak Takraw	6	1	1	5	7
Shooting	9	0	1	1	2
Swimming	8	11	18	13	42
Table Tennis	6	2	6	1	9
Taekwondo	8	4	10	22	36
Tennis	8	0	0	6	6
Traditional Boat Race	-	0	0	0	0
Volleyball	7	0	1	1	2
Vovinam	4	7	10	19	36
Weightlifting	7	0	0	0	0
Wrestling	5	6	7	28	41
Wushu	10	0	0	7	7
Total	7	57	113	204	373

== See also ==
- All-time Southeast Asian Games medal table
- Lists of Southeast Asian Games medalists
