= Molly Tay =

Singaporean swimmer (born 1952)

Personal information
- Nationality: Singaporean
- Born: 13 August 1952 (age 73)

Sport
- Sport: Swimming
Medal record
Representing Singapore
Asian Games
Bronze medal – third place	1966 Bangkok	4x100m freestyle relay
SEA Games
Silver medal – second place	1965 Kuala Lumpur	200m freestyle
Silver medal – second place	1965 Kuala Lumpur	100m backstroke
Silver medal – second place	1965 Kuala Lumpur	200m backstroke
Silver medal – second place	1967 Bangkok	200m freestyle
Silver medal – second place	1967 Bangkok	100m backstroke
Silver medal – second place	1969 Rangoon	100m backstroke
Silver medal – second place	1969 Rangoon	200m backstroke
Bronze medal – third place	1967 Bangkok	100m freestyle
Bronze medal – third place	1967 Bangkok	200m backstroke
Bronze medal – third place	1969 Rangoon	200m freestyle

Molly Tay (born 13 August 1952) is a Singaporean former swimmer. She competed in the women's 100 metre butterfly at the 1964 Summer Olympics. Tay competed at the 1964 Summer Olympics under the Malaysia flag. She failed to qualify from her heats.

== Education ==
Tay studied at Methodist Girls School and later Anglo-Chinese School. During her mid-twenties, Tay studied at Brigham Young University in the United States.

== Swimming career ==
Tay started swimming competitively at the age of 8. At 12 years old, Tay went to 1964 Summer Olympics at Tokyo, Japan where she failed to qualify from her heats in the 100m butterfly event.

At the 1965 Southeast Asian Peninsular Games (SEAP Games), Tay won silver medal for the 200m freestyle event, losing to fellow Singaporean swimmer Pat Chan. She won the silver medals for the 100m and 200m backstroke, losing both events to Cambodia's Chuon Kun. She also won the bronze medal in the 400m freestyle. She was also part of the 4 x 100m medley relay and 4 x 100m freestyle team which won the gold medals.

At the 1966 Asian Games, Tay with her sister, Tay Chin Joo, Chan and Jovina Tseng won the bronze medal for the 4 x 100m freestyle team event. At the 1967 SEAP Games, Tay won silver medal for the 200m freestyle losing to Chan again. She won the silver medal for 100m backstroke event and the bronze medals in the 100m freestyle and the 200m backstroke events. At the 1969 SEAP Games, Tay won silver medals again for the 100m and 200m backstroke events and the bronze medal in the 200m freestyle event.

== Career ==
After graduating from Brigham Young University, Tay worked as a Financial Analyst for Revlon in New York.

== Personal life ==
Tay has three siblings who are also national athletes for Singapore; Tay Boon Tiong Wilson (swimming and water polo), Tay Chin Hong Nora (springboard diving), Tay Chin Joo (swimming).

Tay is married and lives in Westchester County, New York.
