= Samruay Charonggool =

Thai sprinter

Personal information
- Nationality: Thai
- Born: 3 July 1944 (age 82)
- Height: 160 cm (5 ft 3 in)
- Weight: 50 kg (110 lb)

Sport
- Sport: Sprinting
- Events: 100 metres 200 metres 400 metres

Achievements and titles
- Personal bests: 100 metres: 12.6 (1969); 400 metres: 58.0 (1966, nr)
Medal record
Women's athletics
Representing Thailand
SEAP Games
Gold medal – first place	1959 Bangkok	4×100 m relay
Gold medal – first place	1961 Rangoon	4×100 m relay
Silver medal – second place	1967 Bangkok	4×100 m relay
Bronze medal – third place	1969 Rangoon	400 metres

Samruay Charonggool also written as Samroey Charonggool (สำรวย จรางกูร; born 3 July 1944) is a former Thai sprinter.

With the national team she won the gold medal at the in inaugural 1959 SEAP Games in the 4×100 m relay. She became again champion with the team in the same relay event at the 1961 SEAP Games in Rangoon. At the Asian Games she made her debut at the 1962 Asian Games and she reached the semi-finals in both the 100 metres and 200 metres. Two years later she competed in the women's 400 metres and 4 × 100 metres relay at the 1964 Summer Olympics.

In 1964 she broke a total of three national record. Due to her achievements and Olympic appereance she won the inaugural Thai Outstanding Athlete of the Year award for 1964 ahead of badminton player Channarong Ratanaseangsuang, footballer Chalerm Jones and boxer Niyom Prasertsom.

At the 1966 Asian Games she ran a Thai national record in the 400 metres event with a time of 58.0 second and finished in fourth place.

She won the silver medal at the 1967 SEAP Games in the 4×100 m relay event in held in Thailand, and four years later an individual medal in the 400 metres event at the 1969 SEAP Games.

She retired after the 1970 Asian Games where she participated in the 100 metres event.
