= Aquatics at the 1973 SEAP Games =

Aquatics at the 1973 Southeast Asian Peninsular Games

Aquatics at the 1973 Southeast Asian Peninsular Games included swimming, diving and water polo events. The three sports of aquatics were held at Toa Payoh Aquatic Sport Center in Singapore. Aquatics events was held between 2 September to 5 September.

== Swimming ==
Men's events

Event	Gold		Silver		Bronze	
100 m freestyle	(Singapore) Tan Thuan Heng	56.76	(Khmer Republic) Prak Samnang	57.50	(Singapore) Alex Chan	57.60
200 m freestyle	(Singapore) Mark Chan	2:07.90	(Singapore) Khoo Teng Chuan	2:08.18	(Khmer Republic) Tan Bun Thay	2:08.5
400 m freestyle	(Singapore) Khoo Teng Chuan	4:29.27	(Singapore) Mark Chan	4:29.53	(Khmer Republic) Tan Bun Thay	4:31.72
1500 m freestyle	(Singapore) Mark Chan	18:09.71	(Malaysia) Liew Chun Wei	18:21.34	(Myanmar) Aung Khine	18:34.96
100 m backstroke	(Malaysia) Chiang Jin Choon	1:03.91	(Singapore) David Hoe	1:03.96	(Khmer Republic) Van Sarun	1:04.87
200 m backstroke	(Malaysia) Chiang Jin Choon	2:17.53	(Khmer Republic) Van Sarun	2:21.57	(Singapore) David Hoe	2:23.12
100 m breaststroke	(Khmer Republic) Yi Sokhon	1:09.80	(Singapore) Khong Kok Sun	1:12.27	(Khmer Republic) Phath Sim Onn	1:12.91
200 m breaststroke	(Khmer Republic) Yi Sokhon	2:35.98	(Singapore) Alan R. Lelah	2:37.01	(Singapore) Khong Kok Sun	2:39.86
100 m butterfly	(Singapore) Roy Chan	1:00.93	(South Vietnam) Do Nhu Minh	1:02.15	(Malaysia) Christopher Teo	1:02.61
200 m butterfly	(Singapore) Roy Chan	2:14.12	(Singapore) Khoo Teng Chuan	2:19.24	(Malaysia) Lai Wai Kee	2:27.69
400 m individual medley	(Singapore) Roy Chan	5:00.23	(Malaysia) Chiang Jin Choon	5:07.10	(Singapore) Khoo Teng Chuan	5:12.30
4 × 100 m freestyle relay	Singapore Soen Lai Heng; Alex Chan; Roy Chan; Tan Thuan Heng	3:47.86	Khmer Republic Prak Samnang; Tan Bun Thay	3:52.53	Thailand	3:58.12
4 × 200 m freestyle relay	Singapore Roy Chan; Khoo Teng Chuan; Mark Chan; Alex Can	8:37.72	Khmer Republic Prak Samnang; Nop Moy Ngorn; Peo Samnang; Tan Bun Thay	8:46.87	Malaysia Liew Chun Wai; Ho Hee Ming; Christopher Teo; Ting Siu Poh	8:52.56
4 × 100 m medley relay	Singapore David Hoe; Khong Kok Sun; Roy Chan; Tan Thuan Heng	4:14.34	Khmer Republic Van Sarun; Yi Sokhon; Phath Sim Onn; Prak Samnang	4:17.01	Malaysia Chiang Jin Choon; Wong Yik Heam; Christopher Teo; Ting Siu Poh	4:18.11

Women's events

Event	Gold		Silver		Bronze	
100 m freestyle	(Singapore) Patricia Chan	1:03.47	(Singapore) Elaine Sng	1:03.69	(Malaysia) Lim Lay Choo	1:07.49
200 m freestyle	(Singapore) Elaine Sng	2:17.49	(Singapore) Lim Bee Lian	2:21.15	(Malaysia) Lim Lay Choo	2:28.85
400 m freestyle	(Singapore) Elaine Sng	4:47.50	(Singapore) Ang Siew Lan	4:59.51	(Malaysia) Yvone Lam	5:21.86
800 m freestyle	(Singapore) Elaine Sng	10:03.70	(Singapore) Anne Hoe	10:31.30	(Thailand) Rachaniwan Bulakul	11:00.64
100 m backstroke	(Singapore) Patricia Chan	1:12.73	(Singapore) Angela Lecomber	1:16.07	(Malaysia) Vivian Tham Mei Keng	1:17.50
200 m backstroke	(Singapore) Patricia Chan	2:34.90	(Singapore) Angela Lecomber	2:44.02	(Malaysia) Vivian Tham Mei Keng	2:44.38
100 m breaststroke	(Myanmar) Nwe Nwe Yoe	1:23.74	(Singapore) Justina Tseng	1:24.33	(Singapore) Khong Yiu Lan	1:24.64
200 m breaststroke	(Singapore) Justina Tseng	2:58.33	(Malaysia) Rosanna Lam	2:59.96	(Singapore) Khong Yiu Lan	3:01.51
100 m butterfly	(Singapore) Karen Chong	1:10.06	(Malaysia) Lim Lay Choo	1:14.55	(Singapore) Jovina Tseng	1:15.06
200 m butterfly	(Singapore) Karen Chong	2:32.31	(Singapore) Amy Teo	2:37.87	(Thailand) Sansanee Changkasiri	2:54.02
200 m individual medley	(Singapore) Patricia Chan	2:37.24	(Singapore) Lim Bee Lian	2:44.16	(Malaysia) Vivian Lam	2:48.31
4 × 100 m freestyle relay	Singapore Esther Tan; Jovina Tseng; Elaine Sng; Patricia Chan	4:25.24	Malaysia Lim Lay Choo; Yvonne Lam; Jean De Bruyne; Tham Mei Kheng	4:43.87	Thailand Rachaniwan Bulakul; Sansanee Changkasiri ? ?	5:08.06
4 × 100 m medley relay	Singapore Patricia Chan; Justina Tseng; Karen Chong; Elaine Sng	4:58.16	Malaysia Vivian Tham; Rosanna Lam; Lim Lay Choo; Yvonne Lam	5:14.53	Thailand Rachaniwan Bulakul	5:34.42

== Diving ==
Event	Gold		Silver		Bronze	
Men's springboard	(Thailand) Boonchai Lohwaree		(Malaysia) Chan Chee Keong		(Thailand) Somchit Oonsinit	
Men's platform	(Thailand) Tasnee Srivipattana		(Khmer Republic) Ith Puthy		(Singapore) Sally Lim	
Women's springboard	(Malaysia) Gillian Chew	165.48	(Singapore) Nora Tay Chin Hong	151.44	(Singapore) Sally Lim Kwan Fui	149.58
Women's springboard diving	(Singapore) Sally Lim Kwan Fui	322.41	(Singapore) Nora Tay Chin Hong	315.42	(Thailand) Tasne Srivipatana	310.02
Women's highboard	(Thailand) Tasne Srivipatana		(Khmer Republic) Ith Puthy		(Singapore) Sally Lim Kwan Fui	

== Water polo ==
Event	Gold	Silver	Bronze
Men's water polo	Singapore	Malaysia	Thailand

== Medal table ==
Rank	Nation	Gold	Silver	Bronze	Total
1	Singapore (SIN)	24	17	10	51
2	Malaysia (MAS)	3	8	10	21
3	Thailand (THA)	3	0	8	11
4	Cambodia (KHM)	2	7	4	13
5	Burma (BIR)	1	0	1	2
6	South Vietnam (VNM)	0	1	0	1
Totals (6 entries)		33	33	33	99
