= Athletics at the 1959 SEAP Games =

Track and field events in Bangkok

Athletics at the 1959 Southeast Asian Peninsular Games
- Venue: National Stadium
- Date: 12–17 December
- Nations: 6

The athletics competition at the 1959 SEAP Games took place from 13 to 17 December 1959 and was held in Bangkok, Thailand. The main venue is the National Stadium

== Participating countries ==
- Burma
- Malaya
- Singapore
- Thailand (Host)
- Vietnam

== Medals table ==
* Host nation (Thailand)

| Rank | Nation | Gold | Silver | Bronze | Total |
|---|---|---|---|---|---|
| 1 | Thailand (THA)* | 14 | 10 | 9 | 33 |
| 2 | Burma (BIR) | 5 | 6 | 8 | 19 |
| 3 | Malaya (MAS) | 4 | 10 | 4 | 18 |
| 4 | Singapore (SIN) | 4 | 2 | 4 | 10 |
| 5 | Vietnam (VIE) | 0 | 0 | 1 | 1 |
| Totals (5 entries) | | 27 | 28 | 26 | 81 |

== Men ==
| Event | Gold | | Silver | | Bronze | |
|---|---|---|---|---|---|---|
| 100 metres | Suthi Manyakass; Thailand | 10.4 (CR) | Shahrudin Mohamed Ali; Malaya | 10.7 | Ernest Frida; Singapore | 10.7 |
| 200 metres | Suthi Manyakass; Thailand | 21.5 (CR) | Shahrudin Mohamed Ali; Malaya | 21.8 | Ernest Frida; Singapore | 22.1 |
| 400 metres | Somsakdi Tongaram; Thailand | 50.3 (CR) | V. Velayutham; Malaya | 51.2 | Aung Moung; Burma | 51.4 |
| 800 metres | Somsakdi Tongaram; Thailand | 2:00.5 | Mohamed bin Abdul Rahman; Malaya | 2:01.9 | Sai Heng; Burma | 2:02.1 |
| 1,500 metres | Sumpao Pluadprong; Thailand | 4:09.3 | Ah Phu; Burma | 4:10.7 | Sai Heng; Burma | 4:14.0 |
| 5,000 metres | Ah Phu; Burma | 15:50.5 | Somnuek Srisombat; Thailand | 16:00.6 | Thin Sumbwegam; Burma | 16:17.5 |
| 10,000 metres | Somnuek Srisombati; Thailand | 35:07.8 | Thin Sumbwegam; Burma | 35:28.4 | Nguyen Van Ly; Vietnam | 36:12.8 |
| 110 m hurdles | Wong Fei Wan; Singapore | 15.4 | Cyril Perera; Malaya | 15.8 | Tan Eng Yoon; Singapore | 16.0 |
| 400 m hurdles | Tan Eng Yoon; Singapore | 54.9 | Migale Gunasena; Singapore | 57.1 | Phaisal Visutkul; Thailand | 57.7 |
| 4×100 m relay | Thailand (THA); Tipapan Leenasen; Prajim Wongsuwan; Paiboon Vacharapan; Suthi Manyakass | 42.4 | Singapore (SIN); Ernest Frida; Cedric Monteiro; Chai Ling Fook; Low Sin Cheok | 42.5 | Burma (BIR); Soe Aung; Tun Naung; Kyaw Myint II; Tun Mra | 43.6 |
| 4×400 m relay | Thailand (THA); Kamol Swasdikosol; Krungsri Padumwan; Manut Bumrungphuk; Somsakdi Tongaram | 3:24.8 | Malaya (MAS); Andrew Lazaroo; V. Velayutham; Mohamed bin Abdul Rahman; Manikavasagam Jegathesan | 3:25.2 | Singapore (SIN); Migale Gunasena; Ernest Frida; Sim Lim Ho; Low Sin Cheok | 3:26.4 |
| High jump | Tan Ghee Lin; Malaya | 1.88 m | Ratanchaya Kasem; Thailand | 1.85 m | Suntraphai Panlop; Thailand | 1.82 m |
| Pole vault | Pal Singh; Singapore | 3.82 m | Cyril Perera; Malaya; Soe Mra; Burma | 3.50 m | Boonchop Chongklai; Thailand | 3.37 m |
| Long jump | Kaimar-ud-Din bin Maidin; Malaya | 6.74 m | Sudhisri Nipon; Thailand | 6.57 m | Achavasmith Praveth; Thailand | 6.55 m |
| Triple jump | Tan Eng Yoon; Singapore | 14.86 m | Galstin Frederick; Burma | 13.77 m | Kyaw Nyunt; Burma | 13.70 m |
| Shot put | Saengnern Pradit; Thailand | 12.21 m | Naw Phaha; Burma | 11.68 m | Klanarong Pradit; Thailand | 11.58 m |
| Discus throw | Naw Phaha; Burma | 32.68 m | Wanchao Vichienwat; Thailand | 30.91 m | Sumnao Bhudhipol; Thailand | 30.62 m |
| Javelin throw | Poltorn Samphao; Thailand | 53.85 m | Anusasnananda Sanoh; Thailand | 50.74 m | Mya San; Burma | 48.56 m |

== Women ==
| Event | Gold | | Silver | | Bronze | |
|---|---|---|---|---|---|---|
| 100 metres | Carmen Koelmeyer; Malaya | 13.1 | Tan Fong Tin; Malaya | 13.2 | Vannee Chuansnit; Thailand | 13.5 |
| 200 metres | Ratana Supradit; Thailand | 23.6 | Carmen Koelmeyer; Malaya | 27.7 | Preya Dechdumrong; Thailand | 28.4 |
| 80 m hurdles | Gracie Car; Burma | 12.7 | Permpis Puechngern; Thailand | 13.0 | Nhut Xuan Lan Nyugen; Thailand | 13.3 |
| 4×100 m relay | Thailand (THA); Chinda Klaichai; Ratana Supradit; Vannee Chuansnit; Samruay Charonggool | 52.2 | Malaya (MAS); Tan Fong Tin; Carmen Koelmeyer; Maureen Ann Lee; Lily Tan | 52.6 | —N/a | —N/a |
| High jump | May May Yi; Burma | 1.43 m | Tipapan Leenasen; Thailand | 1.40 m | Choong Yew Kum; Malaya | 1.40 m |
| Long jump | Maureen Ann Lee; Malaya | 5.09 m | Chinda Duangdej; Thailand | 4.71 m | Carmen Koelmeyer; Malaya | 4.68 m |
| Shot put | Kusolwan Saracha; Thailand | 9.56 m | Khin Khin Htay; Burma | 8.90 m | Khin Khin Htwe; Burma | 8.89 m |
| Discus throw | Poonsri Songpia; Thailand | 31.66 m | Villal Phuangrom; Thailand | 28.89 m | Tan Siew Chin; Malaya | 28.44 m |
| Javelin throw | Khin Khin Htwe; Burma | 34.84 m | Arunya Promsakha; Thailand | 25.82 m | Hoo Huan Nyin; Malaya | 24.62 m |
