= Malaya at the 1959 SEAP Games =

Malaya at the 1959 Southeast Asian Peninsular Games
- IOC code: MAS
- NOC: Olympic Council of Malaysia
- Website: www.olympic.org.my (in English)

in Bangkok
- Competitors: 66 in 7 sports
- Medals Ranked 3rd: Gold 8 Silver 15 Bronze 11 Total 34

Southeast Asian Peninsular Games appearances
- 1959; 1961; 1965; 1967; 1969; 1971; 1973; 1975; 1977; 1979; 1981; 1983; 1985; 1987; 1989; 1991; 1993; 1995; 1997; 1999; 2001; 2003; 2005; 2007; 2009; 2011; 2013; 2015; 2017; 2019; 2021; 2023; 2025; 2027; 2029

Malaya competed in the 1959 Southeast Asian Peninsular Games held in Bangkok, Thailand from 12 to 17 December 1959. It won 8 gold, 15 silver and 11 bronze medals.

== Medal summary ==
=== Medals by sport ===
Sport	Gold	Silver	Bronze	Total	Rank
Athletics	4	10	4	18	4
Basketball	0	0	1	1	3
Football	0	0	1	1	3
Shooting	1	1	0	2	
Swimming	2	1	1	4	
Tennis	0	2	0	2	
Weightlifting	1	1	1	3	
Total	8	15	11	34	3

=== Medallists ===
Medal	Name	Sport	Event
Gold	Tan Ghee Lin	Athletics	Men's high jump
Gold	Kamaruddin Maidin	Athletics	Men's long jump
Gold	Carmen Koelmeyer	Athletics	Women's 100 metres
Gold	Maureen Ann Lee	Athletics	Women's long jump
Gold	K. C. Chan	Shooting	Men's rifle prone
Gold	Lim Heng Chek	Swimming	Men's 100 metre backstroke
Gold	Lim Heng Chek	Swimming	Men's 100 metre butterfly
Gold	Kwang King Lam	Weightlifting	Men's light heavyweight
Silver	Shaharuddin Ali	Athletics	Men's 100 metres
Silver	Shaharuddin Ali	Athletics	Men's 200 metres
Silver	V. Velautham	Athletics	Men's 400 metres
Silver	Mohamed bin Abdul Rahman	Athletics	Men's 800 metres
Silver	C. Perera	Athletics	Men's 110 metres hurdles
Silver	Choong Yew Kum	Athletics	Men's high jump
Silver	Men's 4 × 400 metre relay team	Athletics	Men's 4 × 400 metre relay
Silver	Tan Fing Thin	Athletics	Women's 100 metres
Silver	Carmen Koelmeyer	Athletics	Women's 200 metres
Silver	Women's 4 × 100 metre relay team	Athletics	Women's 4 × 100 metre relay
Silver	Yeo Tin Seong	Shooting	Men's rifle prone
Silver	Men's 4 × 100 metre medley relay team	Swimming	Men's 4 × 100 metre medley relay
Silver	Katherine Leong; Anna Han	Tennis	Women's doubles
Silver	S. A. Azman; Katherine Leong	Tennis	Mixed doubles
Silver	Chung Kum Weng	Weightlifting	Men's featherweight
Bronze	Choong Yew Kum	Athletics	Men's high jump
Bronze	Tan Siew Chin	Athletics	Women's discus
Bronze	Carmen Koelmeyer	Athletics	Women's long jump
Bronze	Hoo Huang Nyin	Athletics	Women's javelin throw
Bronze	Malaya national basketball team	Basketball	Men's tournament
Bronze	Malaya national football team: Sexton Lourdes; Ng Mun Keai; Cheah Cheng Kok; Tang Choong Hing; R. Anthony; M. Joseph; Abdul Ghani Minhat; P. A. Gunasegaram; Ng Boon Bee; Yusoff Bakar; Ahmad Nazari; Mok Wai Hoong; Edwin C. Dutton; Wong Kam Seng; Arthur Koh; Robert Choe; S. Govindaraju; Stanley Gabriel	Football	Men's tournament
Bronze	Koay Thian Soon	Swimming	Men's 100 metre breaststroke
Bronze	Cheah Sek Thong	Weightlifting	Men's lightweight
