= Tay Chin Joo =

Singaporean swimmer (born 1955)

Personal information
- Born: 12 May 1955 (age 71) Singapore

Sport
- Sport: Swimming
Medal record
Event	1st	2nd	3rd
Asian Games	0	3	4
Southeast Asian Games	9	7	1
Total	9	10	5
Asian Games
Silver medal – second place	Bangkok 1970	4x100m Freestyle Relay
Silver medal – second place	Bangkok 1970	4x100m Medley Relay
Silver medal – second place	Tehran 1974	4x100m Freestyle Relay
Bronze medal – third place	Bangkok 1966	4x100m Freestyle Relay
Bronze medal – third place	Bangkok 1970	100m Butterfly
Bronze medal – third place	Tehran 1974	100m Butterfly
Bronze medal – third place	Tehran 1974	4x100m Medley Relay
Southeast Asian Games
Gold medal – first place	Kuala Lumpur 1965	4x100m Freestyle Relay
Gold medal – first place	Bangkok 1967	4x100m Freestyle Relay
Gold medal – first place	Bangkok 1967	4x100m Medley Relay
Gold medal – first place	Rangoon 1969	4x100m Freestyle Relay
Gold medal – first place	Rangoon 1969	4x100m Medley Relay
Gold medal – first place	Kuala Lumpur 1971	4x100m Freestyle Relay
Gold medal – first place	Kuala Lumpur 1971	4x100m Medley Relay
Gold medal – first place	Kuala Lumpur 1971	100m Butterfly
Gold medal – first place	Kuala Lumpur 1971	200m Butterfly
Silver medal – second place	Bangkok 1967	100m Butterfly
Silver medal – second place	Bangkok 1967	200m Butterfly
Silver medal – second place	Rangoon 1969	100m Butterfly
Silver medal – second place	Rangoon 1969	200m Butterfly
Silver medal – second place	Rangoon 1969	200m Individual Medley
Silver medal – second place	Rangoon 1969	100m Freestyle
Silver medal – second place	Kuala Lumpur 1971	200m Individual Medley
Bronze medal – third place	Bangkok 1967	200m Individual Medley

Tay Chin Joo (born 12 May 1955) is a Singaporean former national swimmer. She competed in the women's 100 metre butterfly at the 1972 Summer Olympics.

== Early life and education ==
Tay was born on 12 May 1955 at Kandang Kerbau Hospital in Singapore. She stayed for a period in Kuala Lumpur, Malaysia with her family when she was young. Tay studied at Methodist Girls' School from 1962 to1971 and then at Anglo-Chinese School for pre-university education. Tay graduated with a Bachelor of Science degree (summa cum laude ) from Arizona State University & subsequently attended the University of California, Los Angeles, where she obtained her master's degree in Business Administration, majoring in finance.

== Swimming career ==
Tay learned to swim when her family was living in Kuala Lumpur, Malaysia. When Tay was six years old, she started competing in diving and swimming competitions with her brother and sisters at the Royal Selangor Golf Club.

At 10 years old, Tay represented Singapore at the 1965 Southeast Asian Peninsular Games (SEAP Games) held at Kuala Lumpur, Malaysia where she is part of the women's 4 × 100 m Freestyle Relay team. The team won gold at the event and Tay became the youngest athlete to win a gold medal in swimming at the SEAP Games.

Tay won the bronze medal in the 4 × 100 m Freestyle Relay event at the 1966 Asian Games.

At the 1967 SEAP Games, Tay took two gold medals in the 4 × 100 m Freestyle Relay and 4 × 100 m Medley Relay events, two silver medals in the 100m and 200m butterfly events where she lost both events to Pat Chan and one bronze medal in the 200m individual medley event.

At the 1969 SEAP Games, Tay improved her medal showing with two gold medals at the 4 × 100 m Freestyle Relay and 4 × 100 m Medley Relay events, four silver medals in the 100m and 200m butterfly events losing to Chan again, 100m freestyle event and 200m individual medley event.

In 1970, at her second Asian Games at Bangkok, Thailand, Tay won two silver medals at the 4 × 100 m Freestyle Relay and 4 × 100 m Medley Relay events and a bronze medal at the 100m butterfly event.

Tay participated at her first British Commonwealth Games in 1970 where she failed to qualify from the heats of the 100m and 200m butterfly events. She was also part of the team in the 4 × 100 m Medley Relay event which finished 7th.

At her last SEAP games outing in 1971, Tay had her best results with four gold medals at the 100m and 200m butterfly events, 4 × 100 m Freestyle Relay and 4 × 100 m Medley Relay events and a silver medal at the 200m individual medley event.

Tay also represented Singapore at the 1971 Hapoel Games.

In 1972, Tay was the only Singaporean swimmer to qualify for the 100 meters butterfly event at the 1972 Munich Olympics. She failed to qualify from her heat.

At the 1974 Asian Games, Tay won a silver medal at the 4 × 100 m Freestyle Relay event and two bronze medals at the and 4 × 100 m Medley Relay and 100m butterfly events.

== Post swimming career ==
Tay was a member of the SSA Legacy Council, which was established in 2015 to highlight and showcase the aquatic fraternity's achievements.

Tay was Vice President (Synchronised Swimming) at the Singapore Swimming Association for 8 years. Her story of bringing the national synchronised swimming team was told in an interview for the illustrated reference book "Great Lengths: Singapore's Swimming Pools".

== Personal life ==
Tay has three siblings who are also national athletes for Singapore; Tay Boon Tiong Winston (swimming and water polo), Tay Chin Hong Nora (springboard diving), Tay Chin Say Molly (swimming).

== Awards ==
Tay was named Singapore's Sportswoman of the Year in 1973, and received the Individual Meritorious Award in 1971 and 1972.
