= Aquatics at the 1961 SEAP Games =

Swimming at the 2nd Southeast Asian Peninsular Games
- Dates: 12–15 December 1961
- No. of events: 19

Aquatics at the 1961 Southeast Asian Peninsular Games included swimming, diving, and waterpolo events. The sports of aquatics were held at Rangoon, Burma. Aquatics events was held between 12 December to 15 December.

== Swimming ==
Men's events

Event	Gold		Silver		Bronze	
100 m freestyle	Burma (BIR) Mya Thee	1:01.0	Burma (BIR) Aung Than	1:01.3	Singapore (SIN) Eric Yeo	1:01.06
200 m freestyle	Burma (BIR) Tin Maung Ni	2:13.9	Burma (BIR) Mya Thee		Singapore (SIN) Tan Thuan Heng	2:19.5
400 m freestyle	Burma (BIR) Tin Maung Ni	4:39.6	Singapore (SIN) Tan Thuan Heng	4:56.4	Burma (BIR) Aung Than	
1500 m freestyle	Burma (BIR) Tin Maung Ni	18:47.1	Singapore (SIN) Tan Thuan Heng	19:11.1	Burma (BIR) Aung Than	
100 m backstroke	Burma (BIR) Chit Sein	1:13.0	Malaya (MAL) Lim Heng Chek	1:13.5	Thailand (THA) Bhairoje Bochanasamburana	1:13.9
200 m backstroke						
100 m breaststroke						
200 m breaststroke	Vietnam (VIE) Huỳnh Văn Hải	2:50.9	Singapore (SIN) Kenneth Kee	2:50.9	Vietnam (VIE) Truong Ke Nhon	2:51.0
100 m butterfly	Vietnam (VIE) Phan Huu Dong	1:09.6	Singapore (SIN) Bernard Chan	1:10.6	Burma (BIR) Tin Maung Ni	
200 m butterfly						
4 × 200 m freestyle relay	Burma (BIR)	9:18.4	Singapore (SIN)	9:35.0	Malaya (MAL)	9:52.9
4 × 100 m medley relay	Burma (BIR)	4:46.7	Singapore (SIN)	4:47.3	Vietnam (VIE)	4:48.4

Women's events

Event	Gold		Silver	Bronze
100 m freestyle	Burma (BIR) Myint Myint Khin	1:19.5	Burma (BIR) Elizabeth Smyth	Thailand (THA) Sirivum Vimolnoth
200 m freestyle	Burma (BIR) Elizabeth Smyth	2:55.0	Burma (BIR) Sylvia Thwin	Thailand (THA) Sirivum Vimolnoth
100 m backstroke	Burma (BIR) Ma Myunt Khin	1:43.3	Burma (BIR) Sylvia Thwin	Thailand (THA) Chongkoal Tavananaonta
100 m breaststroke	Burma (BIR) Lillian Thwin	1:39.7	Burma (BIR) Myint Myint Khin	Thailand (THA) Chongkoal Tavananaonta
100 m butterfly				
4 × 100 m freestyle relay	Burma (BIR)	5:38.8	Thailand (THA)	not awarded (only two participants)
4 × 100 m medley relay	Burma (BIR)		Thailand (THA)	not awarded (only two participants)
