= Narong Chokumnuay =

Thai swimmer (born 1944)

Personal information
- Born: 21 September 1944 (age 81)

Sport
- Sport: Swimming
Medal record
Representing Thailand
Asian Games
Bronze medal – third place	1966 Bangkok	4x200m freestyle relay
SEA Games
Gold medal – first place	1965 Kuala Lumpur	4x200m freestyle relay
Silver medal – second place	1965 Kuala Lumpur	400m individual medley
Silver medal – second place	1967 Bangkok	100m freestyle
Silver medal – second place	1967 Bangkok	100m butterfly
Bronze medal – third place	1965 Kuala Lumpur	200m butterfly

Narong Chokumnuay (born 21 September 1944) is a Thai former swimmer. He competed in two events at the 1964 Summer Olympics.
