= Marina Chan =

Singaporean swimmer

Personal information
- Full name: Nur Marina Chan Shi Min Alif Abdullah
- Nationality: Singaporean
- Born: 24 December 1997 (age 28) Singapore
- Height: 1.67 m (5 ft 6 in)
- Weight: 55 kg (121 lb)

Sport
- Sport: Swimming
- Strokes: freestyle, butterfly
- Coach: Gary Tan
Medal record
Southeast Asian Championships
Gold medal – first place	2012 Singapore	4×200 m freestyle
Gold medal – first place	2014 Singapore	50 m butterfly
Silver medal – second place	2014 Singapore	50 m freestyle
Silver medal – second place	2014 Singapore	100 m freestyle
Silver medal – second place	2014 Singapore	100 m butterfly
Silver medal – second place	2014 Singapore	4×100 m freestyle
Silver medal – second place	2014 Singapore	4×200 m freestyle
Silver medal – second place	2014 Singapore	4×100 m medley
Asian Youth Games
Silver medal – second place	2013 Nanjing	50 m freestyle
Silver medal – second place	2013 Nanjing	100 m freestyle
Silver medal – second place	2013 Nanjing	4×100 m freestyle
Silver medal – second place	2013 Nanjing	4×100 m medley

Marina Chan (born Nur Marina Chan Si Min Alif Abdullah; 24 December 1997) is a Singaporean freestyle and butterfly swimmer. Hailing from a prominent swimming family, Chan only took up the sport in her first year of high school. She has represented her country at the FINA World Cup, Asian Games, Asian Swimming Championships, Commonwealth Games, Youth Olympic Games and the Asian Youth Games with her aim win a gold medal at the 2020 Olympic Games in Tokyo.

== Career ==
Chan was first selected to represent her country at the Singaporean leg of the 2010 FINA Swimming World Cup where, aged just 12, she competed in four events. In July the following year, Chan set her first national under 17's record in the 4 × 100-metre freestyle relay at the 2011 ASEAN School Games and finished the year by competing at the Stockholm, Moscow, Berlin and Singapore legs of 2011 FINA Swimming World Cup.

In June 2012, Chan won first major medal at the inaugural Southeast Asian Swimming Championships in Singapore. Swimming alongside Koh Hui Yu, Amanda Lim and Teo Jing Wen, the foursome won gold and the set the first Championship record in the 4 × 200-metre freestyle relay. Less than a month later, at the 2012 ASEAN School Games in Surabaya, Indonesia, Chan as part of the team that took out the 4 × 100-metre freestyle relay. Posting a time of 3:56.55, this shaved 0.69 seconds off the national under 17's record and narrowly missed Thailand's meet record of 3:56.14. Chan also finished with a bronze in the 800-metre freestyle, stopping the clock at 9:15.12.

During the Tokyo leg of the 2012 FINA Swimming World Cup, Chan set a personal best in the 50-metre freestyle of 26.46 seconds. At the eighth and final leg in Singapore, Chan covered the distance in 26.45, setting a new personal best by 0.01 seconds, eclipsing the time she set four days prior.

After gaining valuable experience by competing in the Dubai Asian Swimming Championships in December 2012, Chan won four silver medals at the 2013 Asian Youth Games in Nanjing. Individually, she was runner-up in the 50-metre and 100-metre freestyle events. She then teamed with up Samantha Yeo, Stacy Tan and Meagan Lim to come second in the 4 × 100-metre medley relay and in the 4 × 100-metre freestyle relay, Chan with Yeo, Hoong En Qi and Rachel Tseng set a new national 17's record time, bettering the previous record by 1.88 seconds.

"I'm really happy and very satisfied with my swim and every time I break a record it just overwhelms me to know that I can do it. So I'm really happy because I believe I really did more than what I set out to achieve."

— Marina Chan, 10 June 2014

Chan started 2014 by claiming three individual gold medals and a silver at the 2014 Southeast Asian Age Group Swimming Championships in Singapore. Swimming in the 14–16 aged group, Chan won the 100-metre freestyle in 56.87 and the 50-metre butterfly in 27.91, both new championship record and personal best times. She also took out the 50-metre freestyle in 26.31 narrowly missing the championship record of 26.28 set by Thailand's Jenjira Srisaard in 2012. Chan won her silver medal in the 200-metre freestyle. Finishing 2.12 seconds behind Vietnam's Nguyễn Thị Ánh Viên, Chan stopped the clock at 2:04.44 inside the old championship record of 2:04.65 set by Benjaporn Sriphanomthorn of Thailand in 2011. Chan was also part of a Thailand clean sweep, taking out all three female relays in new championship record times. In the 4 × 100-metre freestyle Chan, Rachel Tseng, Christie Chue and Hannah Quek recorded a time of 3:54.66. This also broke national under 17's record by one hundredth of a second. In the 4 × 200-metre freestyle, Chan, Tseng, Chue and Jing Wen Quah smashed the meet record by over 9 seconds, lowering it to 8:30.84 and in the final event of the meet Chan with Tseng, Chue and Tan Jing-E just got home over Thailand in the 4 × 100-metre medley relay, posting a time of 4:20.25. This time also shaved 0.12 seconds off the under 17's record.

Two weeks later at the 2014 Southeast Asian Swimming Championships in Singapore, Chan won gold in the 50-metre butterfly in a new championship record and personal best time of 27.49. Chan also won six silver medals and set a new personal best of 1:01.67 in the 100-metre butterfly. One month later at the Glasgow Commonwealth Games, Chan competed in six events before heading to the 2014 Summer Youth Olympics in Nanjing in August where she reached the semi-finals 50-metre butterfly and the 50-metre freestyle. In September, Chan competed at 2014 Asian Games in Incheon, South Korea, where in the final of 50-metre freestyle she achieved a new personal best time of 25.91, breaking the 26-second barrier for the first time.

== Personal life ==
Marina Chan comes from a prominent Singaporean family. She is the daughter of Bernard Chan, an Olympic swimmer and niece of Pat Chan, dubbed "Singapore's Golden Girl". Her uncles Alex Chan and Roy Chan both represented Singapore in swimming at the Asian Games with Roy going on to earn the President's Scholarship. Her other uncle is renowned composer Mark Chan and her aunt, Victoria Chan-Palay, was also a President's Scholar who went on to be first in her class at Harvard Medical School and is the first woman to graduate summa cum laude from Harvard Medical School. She is a notable neuroscientist who has worked in the United States and Switzerland as an Alzheimer's expert. Marina is also the granddaughter of the decorated swimming coach Chan Ah Kow. When asked about her family's success and the pressure to live up to it, Chan replied "It's a family legacy and I should be proud of it. There's a bit of pressure, but in a good way. (But) I want to be my own swimmer."

In July 2014, Chan was one of the 300 athletes to receive the Singapore Olympic Foundation Peter Lim Scholarship. Launched in 2010, the scholarship aims to provide financial assistance to outstanding young athletes from financially challenged backgrounds to facilitate their pursuit in sports excellence. Upon receiving the award Chan stated that she will use it to focus towards how she is able to improve her training. "So with that financial help, I'll be able to go overseas for training camps. That is the type of support I need to push myself further."

== Personal bests ==
Below is Chan's personal best times.

Course	Event	Time	Meet	Location	Date	Ref
Long	50-metre freestyle	25.91	Asian Games	Incheon	26 September 2014	
Long	100-metre freestyle	56.87	SEA Age Group Championships	Singapore	8 June 2014	
Long	50-metre butterfly	27.49	SEA Championships	Singapore	18 June 2014	
Long	100-metre butterfly	1:01.67	SEA Championships	Singapore	19 June 2014	
