= Bernard Chan (swimmer) =

Singaporean swimmer (born 1946)

Personal information
- Full name: Bernard Chan Cheng Wah
- Born: 8 October 1946 (age 79) Singapore
- Height: 1.78 m (5 ft 10 in)
- Weight: 72 kg (159 lb)

Sport
- Sport: Swimming
- Club: Chinese Swimming Club, Singapore
Medal record
Representing Singapore
SEA Games
Gold medal – first place	1965 Kuala Lumpur	100m butterfly
Silver medal – second place	1961 Rangoon	100m butterfly

Bernard Chan Cheng Wah (born 8 October 1946) is a retired swimmer and water polo player from Singapore. He competed at the 1964 Summer Olympics for Malaysia in the 200 m butterfly and 4×100 m medley relay events, but failed to reach the finals.

Chan and his siblings were coached by their father, Chan Ah Kow, the Singaporean Coach of the Year in 1970 and 1971. His sister Patricia and brothers Alex and Roy competed at the Olympic and Asian Games. His other brother Mark Chan is a composer, whereas his other sister Victoria Chan-Palay became a prominent neuroscientist in the United States and Switzerland. His daughter Marina Chan is also an international swimmer.
