= Boxing at the 1959 SEAP Games =

Boxing events in Bangkok

Boxing at the 1959 Southeast Asian Peninsular Games
- Date: 14–17 December
- Competitors: 21 from 3 nations

Boxing is one of the 12 sports featured in the 1959 Southeast Asian Peninsular Games held from 14 to 17 December 1959. Due to only three countries participating in this event, all athletes were already assured of medals.

During the initial draw for the tournament, five Singaporean boxers have drawn byes and are supposed to go straight to the finals of their respective events. However, a few days later, Burma protested the draw results, therefore a re-draw was made with the agreement from Singapore.

== Participating countries ==
- Burma
- Singapore
- Thailand (Host)

== Medal table ==
* Host nation (Thailand)

| Rank | Nation | Gold | Silver | Bronze | Total |
|---|---|---|---|---|---|
| 1 | Thailand (THA)* | 5 | 2 | 1 | 8 |
| 2 | Burma (BIR) | 2 | 3 | 1 | 6 |
| 3 | Singapore (SIN) | 1 | 3 | 3 | 7 |
| Totals (3 entries) | | 8 | 8 | 5 | 21 |

== Medalists ==
=== Men ===
| Event | Gold | Silver | Bronze |
|---|---|---|---|
| Light flyweight (48 kg) | Banmet Intrate; Thailand | Yai Meit; Burma | Abu Hassan; Singapore |
| Flyweight (51 kg) | Kicha Punpol; Thailand | V. Kesavan; Singapore | Hla Nyunt; Burma |
| Bantamweight (54 kg) | Ow Mun Hong; Singapore | Hartum; Burma | Somsak Piacharern; Thailand |
| Featherweight (57 kg) | Aung Tun; Burma | Bhodi Sooknoi; Thailand | V. Virabhak; Singapore |
| Lightweight (60 kg) | Sued Chunda Kowiokaya; Thailand | Gopalan Ramakrishnan; Singapore | —N/a |
| Light welterweight (63.5 kg) | Sawong Mongkolrit; Thailand | Khin Min Win; Burma | —N/a |
| Welterweight (66 kg) | Tongchai Teptani; Thailand | Damyon Dunsford; Singapore | —N/a |
| Light middleweight (70 kg) | Stanley Majid; Burma | Sutep Suttiwudi; Thailand | Majid bin Jantan; Singapore |

== Results ==
=== Men's ===
==== Light flyweight (48 kg) ====
Semifinals
Yai Meit (BIR) | PTS
Abu Hassan (SIN)

Final
Banmet Intrate (THA) | PTS
Yai Meit (BIR)

==== Flyweight (51 kg) ====
Semifinals
Hla Nyunt (BIR)
Kicha Punpol (THA) | PTS

Final
V. Kesavan (SIN)
Kicha Punpol (THA) | PTS

==== Bantamweight (54 kg) ====
Semifinals
Ow Mun Hong (SIN) | PTS
Somsak Piacharern (THA)

Final
Hartum (BIR)
Ow Mun Hong (SIN) | PTS

==== Featherweight (57 kg) ====
Semifinals
Aung Tun (BIR) | PTS
V. Virabhak (SIN)

Final
Bhodi Sooknoi (THA)
Aung Tun (BIR) | TKO R3

==== Lightweight (60 kg) ====
| Final |
| Sued Chunda Kowiokaya (THA) | PTS |
| Gopalan Ramakrishnan (SIN) |

==== Light welterweight (63 kg) ====
| Final |
| Sawong Mongkolrit (THA) | PTS |
| Khin Min Win (BIR) |

==== Welterweight (66 kg) ====
| Final |
| Tongchai Teptani (THA) | PTS |
| Damyon Dunsford (SIN) |

==== Light middleweight (70 kg) ====
Semifinals
Sutep Suttiwudi (THA) | PTS
Majid bin Jantan (SIN)

Final
Stanley Majid (BIR) | TKO R3
Sutep Suttiwudi (THA)
