= Tin Maung Ni =

Burmese swimmer

Personal information
- Born: May 5, 1938 Bhamo, Kachin State, Burma (Myanmar)
- Died: April 2, 1974 (aged 35)

Sport
- Sport: Swimming
Medal record
Representing Burma
Asian Games
Gold medal – first place	1962 Jakarta	400m freestyle
Gold medal – first place	1962 Jakarta	1500m freestyle
Bronze medal – third place	1962 Jakarta	200m freestyle
SEA Games
Gold medal – first place	1959 Bangkok	100m freestyle
Gold medal – first place	1959 Bangkok	200m freestyle
Gold medal – first place	1961 Rangoon	200m freestyle
Gold medal – first place	1961 Rangoon	400m freestyle
Gold medal – first place	1961 Rangoon	1500m freestyle
Gold medal – first place	1965 Kuala Lumpur	1500m freestyle
Silver medal – second place	1965 Kuala Lumpur	200m freestyle
Silver medal – second place	1965 Kuala Lumpur	400m freestyle

Tin Maung Ni (5 May 1938 – 2 April 1974) was a Burmese swimmer who took part in the 1960 Summer Olympics and 1964 Summer Olympics.

== Swimming career ==
From the age of fifteen, he started his swimming career. He won the regional swimming competitions and went on to win medals at the University, National, SEAP, and Asian Games. He competed in freestyle relays and 4x100m medley relay.

In 1958, he attended University of Rangoon after finishing the matriculation examination. In his freshman year, he participated in the Yangon All Clubs Swimming Competition and broke the national records in 100m, 200m, 400m, 800m and 1500m freestyle.

In 1959, Matsui Dar, a Japanese swimming trainer, became his coach. He participated in the South East Asian Games in Bangkok and wrote new records in 100m and 200m freestyle swimming.

In 1960, he participated in the Rome Olympics, he competed in the 1500 metre freestyle event and finished in 20th place but did not advance to the final. He won gold medals in 200m, 400m and 1500m and a silver medal in 100m swimming in second South East Asian Games in Jakarta, Indonesia.

In 1961, he participated in swimming competition in Hapoel Celebration in Israel and won gold medal in 1500m freestyle and silver medals in 200m and 400m freestyle.

In 1961 SEAP Games Yangon, he won gold medals in 200m, 400m and 1500m individual free style swimming and broke the record for 4 x 100 m freestyle relay.

In 1962, he participated in Asian Olympic games and won gold medals in 1500m and 400m freestyle swimming. He also got a Bronze medal in 200m freestyle.

Tin Maung Ni participated in 1964 Tokyo Olympic and competed in 400m and 1500m freestyle and finished 6th and 4th in the heats, respectively.

== Personal life ==
He was the fourth of five siblings. He died on 2 April 1974, before his 36th birthday.
