= Shahrudin =

Shahrudin is both a Malaysian given name and surname. Notable people with the name include

== Given name ==
- Shahrudin Mohamed Ali (born 1941), Malaysian sprinter

== Surname ==
- Khairul Anwar Shahrudin (born 1990), Malaysian footballer
