= Ong Mei Lin =

Malaysian swimmer

Personal information
- Nationality: Malaysian
- Born: 23 February 1952 (age 74)

Sport
- Sport: Swimming
Medal record
Representing Malaysia
SEA Games
Gold medal – first place	1971 Kuala Lumpur	200m individual medley
Silver medal – second place	1971 Kuala Lumpur	200m backstroke
Bronze medal – third place	1969 Rangoon	100m backstroke
Bronze medal – third place	1969 Rangoon	200m backstroke
Bronze medal – third place	1969 Rangoon	100m butterfly
Bronze medal – third place	1969 Rangoon	200m butterfly
Bronze medal – third place	1969 Rangoon	200m individual medley

Ong Mei Lin (born 23 February 1952) is a Malaysian former backstroke and medley swimmer. She competed in three events at the 1972 Summer Olympics.
