= Stanley Majid =

Burmese boxer (born 1929)

Dr. Stanley Majid
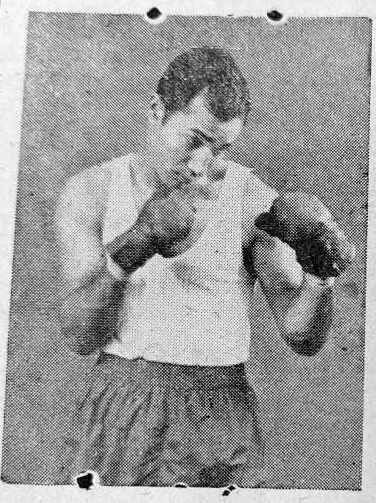
- Stanley Majid in March 1957

Personal information
- Native name: စတန်လေမဂျစ်
- Full name: Hazrat Sayyid Sheikh Muhammad Habibullah Bahadur Shah
- Nickname: Sugar Majid
- Nationality: Burmese
- Born: 14 December 1929
- Education: MBBS, Rangoon University Faculty of Medicine

Sport
- Sport: Boxing
Medal record
Representing (Myanmar)
SEAP Games
Gold medal – first place	Bangkok 1959	Light middleweight
Asian Games
Bronze medal – third place	Tokyo 1958	Light middleweight

Stanley Majid (born 14 December 1929) was a Burmese boxer. He competed in the men's light welterweight event at the 1952 Summer Olympics.

== Professional boxing record ==
Result	Opponent	Type	Round, time	Date	Location	Notes
Win	(Thailand) Sutep Suttiwudi	TKO	3 (3)	16 Dec 1959	1959 Southeast Asian Peninsular Games, Bangkok, Thailand	Pin Welterweight bout
Loss	(Japan) Osamu Takahashi	KO	1 (3)	30 May 1958	Korakuen Ice Palace, Tokyo, Japan	3rd Asian Games
Win	(South Korea) Kim In-Woon	DEC	3 (3)	28 May 1958	Korakuen Ice Palace, Tokyo, Japan	3rd Asian Games, Light Middleweight bout
Win	(Myanmar) Kumar Yine	DEC	3 (3)	8 Apr 1958	(Myanmar) Bogyoke Aung San Stadium, Rangoon, Burma	Asian Games selections, Welterweight bout
Win	(Myanmar) Mya Maung	TKO	1 (3)	16 Feb 1958	(Myanmar) Bogyoke Aung San Stadium, Rangoon, Burma	
Loss	(Japan) Tamotsu Ishii	DEC	3 (3)	14 Dec 1957	(Myanmar) Bogyoke Aung San Stadium, Rangoon, Burma	SEA Boxing Championship final
Win	(Philippines) Norberto David	DEC	3 (3)	10 Dec 1957	(Myanmar) Bogyoke Aung San Stadium, Rangoon, Burma	SEA Boxing Championship semi-final
Win	(India) M. Ranganathan	DEC	3 (3)	9 Dec 1957	(Myanmar) Bogyoke Aung San Stadium, Rangoon, Burma	Awarded victory after a foul
Win	(Myanmar) Kumar Yine	KO	3 (3)	3 Oct 1957	(Myanmar) Bogyoke Aung San Stadium, Rangoon, Burma	
Loss	(India) Ron Norris	KO		18 Feb 1956	(Myanmar) U.B.A.A. Stadium, Mandalay, Burma	Majid suffered from dysentery on Feb.9, not cleared to fight. Gear bag also misplaced in Loikaw
Loss	(Singapore) Alan Gregory	DEC	3 (3)	3 Sep 1955	Singapore Badminton Hall, Singapore	SEA Boxing Championships
Win	(Australia) Les Harrod	TKO	3 (3)	30 Aug 1955	Singapore Badminton Hall, Singapore	SEA Boxing Championships
Win	(India) Jihay	DEC	2 (3)	3 Apr 1954	(Myanmar) Bogyoke Aung San Stadium, Rangoon, Burma	Awarded victory after a foul
Win	(Myanmar) Terrence Aung	DEC	3 (3)	6 Jun 1953	(Myanmar) Rangoon City Hall, Rangoon, Burma	
Loss	(Japan) Toshizo Onuki	DEC	3 (3)	27 Apr 1953	(Myanmar) Burma Athletic Association Grounds, Rangoon, Burma	Light Welterweight bout
Win	(Myanmar) Iron Ko Ko Gyi	KO		24 Jan 1953	(Myanmar) Burma Athletic Association Grounds, Rangoon, Burma	
Loss	(Finland) Erkki Mallenius	TKO	3 (3)	29 Jul 1952	Messuhalli, Helsinki, Finland	Olympic Games preliminaries
Win	(India) V. Bhagona (Navy)	KO	3 (3)	10 May 1952	(Myanmar) Burma Athletic Association Grounds, Rangoon, Burma	
Win	(Myanmar) A.K. Grant (Army)	DEC	3 (3)	20 Feb 1951	(Myanmar) Burma Athletic Association Grounds, Rangoon, Burma	
Draw	(Myanmar) Leo Monteen (Ygn Gazette)	DEC	3 (3)	6 Jan 1950	(Myanmar) Burma Athletic Association Grounds, Rangoon, Burma	
Win	(Myanmar) B. Sakta	NC	0 (3)	19 Nov 1949	(Myanmar) Burma Athletic Association Grounds, Rangoon, Burma	Tatmadaw Relief Fundraiser. Opponent did not show, Majid awarded win
Loss	(Myanmar) Min Kywe	TKO	3 (3)	14 Jan 1949	(Myanmar) Police force compound along Pyay Road, Rangoon, Burma	Lightweight bout
