= Malaya at the 1961 SEAP Games =

Malaya at the 1961 Southeast Asian Peninsular Games
- IOC code: MAS
- NOC: Olympic Council of Malaysia
- Website: www.olympic.org.my (in English)

in Rangoon
- Competitors: 87 in 11 sports
- Medals Ranked 3rd: Gold 16 Silver 24 Bronze 39 Total 79

Southeast Asian Peninsular Games appearances
- 1959; 1961; 1965; 1967; 1969; 1971; 1973; 1975; 1977; 1979; 1981; 1983; 1985; 1987; 1989; 1991; 1993; 1995; 1997; 1999; 2001; 2003; 2005; 2007; 2009; 2011; 2013; 2015; 2017; 2019; 2021; 2023; 2025; 2027; 2029

Malaya competed in the 1961 Southeast Asian Peninsular Games held in Rangoon, Burma from 11 to 16 December 1961. It won 16 gold, 24 silver and 39 bronze medals.

== Medal summary ==
=== Medals by sport ===
Sport	Gold	Silver	Bronze	Total	Rank
Athletics	9	4	7	20	1
Badminton	2	2	1	5	2
Basketball	0	0	1	1	3
Boxing	0	0	1	1	
Football	1	0	0	1	1
Shooting	0	0	2	2	
Swimming	0	1	1	2	
Tennis	1	2	0	3	
Total	16	24	39	79	3

=== Medallists ===
Medal	Name	Sport	Event
Gold	Mani Jegathesan	Athletics	Men's 200 metres
Gold	Mani Jegathesan	Athletics	Men's 400 metres
Gold	Karu Selvaratnam	Athletics	Men's 400 metres hurdles
Gold	Kamaruddin Maidin	Athletics	Men's long jump
Gold	Danapal Naidu	Athletics	Men's discus throw
Gold	Ng Kah Liew	Athletics	Men's javelin throw
Gold		Athletics	Men's 4 × 400 metres relay
Gold	Lily Tan	Athletics	Women's 80 metres hurdles
Gold	Maureen Ann Lee	Athletics	Women's long jump
Gold	Ng Boon Bee; Tan Yee Khan	Badminton	Men's doubles
Gold	Tan Gaik Bee	Badminton	Women's singles
Gold	Malaya national football team	Football	Men's tournament
Gold	Katherine Loh	Tennis	Women's singles
Silver	Mani Jegathesan	Athletics	Men's 100 metres
Silver	Ramasamy Subramaniam	Athletics	Men's 800 metres
Silver	Lily Tan	Athletics	Women's 200 metres
Silver	Kuan Keng Lum	Athletics	Men's shot put
Silver	Teh Kew San	Badminton	Men's singles
Silver	Ng Boon Bee; Ng Mei Ling	Badminton	Mixed doubles
Silver	Lim Heng Chek	Swimming	Men's 100 metres backstroke
Silver	Tan Song Kean	Tennis	Men's singles
Silver	S. A. Azman; Tan Song Kean	Tennis	Men's doubles
Bronze	Rahim Ahmad	Athletics	Men's 400 metres
Bronze	Mohamed Abdul Rahman	Athletics	Men's 800 metres
Bronze	J. Marimutthu	Athletics	Men's 10,000 metres
Bronze	Nashatar Singh Sidhu	Athletics	Men's discus throw
Bronze	Lily Tan	Athletics	Women's 100 metres
Bronze	Teh Wan Choo	Athletics	Women's 200 metres
Bronze	Nashatar Singh Sidhu	Athletics	Men's shot put
Bronze	Malaysia national basketball team	Basketball	Men's tournament
Bronze	Ariffin Ali	Boxing	Men's lightweight
Bronze	Chan Kooi Chye	Shooting	Men's small bore rifle prone
Bronze	Tang Peng Choy	Shooting	Men's three position 300 metres
Bronze		Swimming	Men's 4 × 200 metre freestyle relay
