= Singapore at the 1959 SEAP Games =

Singapore at the 1959 SEA Games
- IOC code: SGP (SIN used at these Games)
- NOC: Singapore Olympic and Sports Council
- Website: www.singaporeolympics.com

in Bangkok, Thailand
- Medals Ranked 4th: Gold 8 Silver 7 Bronze 18 Total 33

SEA Games appearances (overview)
- 1959; 1961; 1965; 1967; 1969; 1971; 1973; 1975; 1977; 1979; 1981; 1983; 1985; 1987; 1989; 1991; 1993; 1995; 1997; 1999; 2001; 2003; 2005; 2007; 2009; 2011; 2013; 2015; 2017; 2019; 2021; 2023; 2025; 2027; 2029

Singapore, as one of the founding members of the Southeast Asian Games, participated in the first edition of then-named 1959 Southeast Asian Peninsular Games, which was then held in Bangkok, Thailand, from 19 to 26 November 1959.

Out of the 5 participating nations, Singapore finished fourth, amassing 8 gold, 7 silver and 18 bronze medals.

== Medal summary ==
=== Medals by sport ===
Sport	Gold	Silver	Bronze	Total	Rank
Athletics	4	2	4	10	NA
Boxing	1	3	3	7	NA
Shooting	0	0	2	2	NA
Swimming	1	2	4	7	NA
Tennis	0	0	2	2	NA
Weightlifting	2	0	3	5	NA
Total	8	7	18	33	4

== Medalists ==
Medalists are arranged in order of sports alphabetically.

Medal	Athlete	Sport	Event	Date
Gold	Wong Fei Wan	Athletics	Men's 110m hurdles	NA
Gold	Tan Eng Yoon	Athletics	Men's 400m hurdles	14 Dec
Gold	Tan Eng Yoon	Athletics	Men's Triple jump	NA
Gold	A Pal Singh	Athletics	Men's Pole vault	NA
Gold	Ow Mun Hong	Boxing	Men's bantamweight	NA
Gold	Gan Eng Joo; Gan Eng Guan; Tan Cheow Choon; Fong Hoe Beng	Swimming	Men's 4 × 100 m Free	NA
Gold	Chua Phuang Kim	Weightlifting	Men's bantamweight	14 Dec
Gold	Tan Howe Liang	Weightlifting	Men's lightweight	NA
Silver	Migale Gunasena	Athletics	Men's 400m hurdles	14 Dec
Silver	Ernest Frida; Cedric Montiero; Chai Ling Fook; Low Sin Cheok	Athletics	Men's 4 × 100 m Relay	NA
Silver	Damyon Dunsford	Boxing	Men's welterweight	NA
Silver	Krishnan Gopalan	Boxing	Men's lightweight	NA
Silver	V. Kesavan	Boxing	Men's flyweight	NA
Silver	Seah Pong Pin	Swimming	Men's 100m Breast	NA
Silver	Seah Pong Pin	Swimming	Men's 100m Fly	NA
Bronze	Ernest Frida	Athletics	Men's 100m	NA
Bronze	Ernest Frida	Athletics	Men's 200m	NA
Bronze	Tan Eng Yoon	Athletics	Men's 110m hurdles	NA
Bronze	Migale Gunasena; Ernest Frida; Ho Sim Lin; Low Sin Cheok	Athletics	Men's 4 × 400 m Relay	NA
Bronze	Abu Hassan	Boxing	Men's light flyweight	NA
Bronze	V. Virabhak	Boxing	Men's featherweight	NA
Bronze	Majib bin Jantan	Boxing	Men's light middleweight	NA
Bronze	Loh Ah Chee	Shooting	Men's silhoutte	NA
Bronze	Kok Kum Woh	Shooting	Men's free pistol	NA
Bronze	Tan Gek Khee; Seah Pong Pin; Goh Soon Hock; Fong Hoe Beng	Swimming	Men's 4 × 100 m Medley	NA
Bronze	Tan Gek Khee	Swimming	Men's 100m Breast	NA
Bronze	Tan Cheow Choon	Swimming	Men's 100m Free	NA
Bronze	Tan Cheow Choon	Swimming	Men's 200m Free	NA
Bronze	Ong Chew Bee	Tennis	Men's Singles	NA
Bronze	Ong Chew Bee; Khong Kit Soon	Tennis	Men's Doubles	NA
Bronze	Ow Fook Seng	Weightlifting	Men's flyweight	14 Dec
Bronze	Tan Ser Cher	Weightlifting	Men's featherweight	NA
Bronze	Yeo Gim Cheong	Weightlifting	Men's light heavyweight	NA
All sporting and medalist records are kept by SNOC
