= Somsak =

Somsak (Thai: สมศักดิ์, pronounced [sǒm.sàk]) is a Thai masculine given name. It is the second-most popular male name in Thailand, with about 230,000 people using the name in 2012.

Notable people with the name include:

- Somsak Boontud (born 1952), sprinter
- Somsak Chaiyarate (born 1923), sports shooter
- Somsak Jeamteerasakul, historian
- Somsak Kiatsuranont (born 1954), politician
- Somsak Kosaisuuk, union official and politician
- Somsak Prissanananthakul, politician
- Somsak Sithchatchawal (born 1977), boxer
- Somsak Thonf Ar-Ram (born 1934), Thai Olympic runner
