= Somsakdi Tongaram =

Thai Olympic runner (born 1934)

Personal information
- Born: 1934 (age 91–92)

Sport
- Country: Thailand
- Sport: Athletics
- Events: 400 metres 800 metres
Medal record
Men's athletics
Representing Thailand
Southeast Asian Games
Gold medal – first place	1959 Bangkok	400 m
Gold medal – first place	1959 Bangkok	800 m
Gold medal – first place	1959 Bangkok	4 × 400 m
Gold medal – first place	1961 Rangoon	800 m
Bronze medal – third place	1961 Rangoon	4 × 400 m

Somsak Thonf Ar-ram (Thai: สมศักดิ์ ทองอร่าม; born 1934), also written as Somsakdi Tongaram, is a Thai sprinter and middle-distance runner. He won four gold medals at the SEA Games and represented Thailand in different events at the 1956 Summer Olympics and the 1960 Summer Olympics.

== Career ==
In his Olympic debut, Tongaram was seeded in the 5th 400 metres heat at the 1956 Summer Olympics. He ran 53.61 seconds to place 5th and did not advance.

He represented Thailand at the 1958 Asian Games in the 400 metres, 800 metres, and 4 × 400 metres relay. He won his first-round 400 m heat to advance to the semi-finals, where he did not place in the top 3 to advance to the finals. In the 800 m, he did not advance from the semi-finals. He anchored the Thai team in the 4 × 400 m relay to finish 5th in the finals.

At the 1959 South East Asian Peninsular Games in Bangkok, Tongaram won gold medals in the 400 m, 800 m, and 4 × 400 m. In the 400 m, he ran 50.3 seconds to set a new championship record. He ran 2:00.5 in the 800 m and anchored the Thai relay to a 3:24.8 winning time.

Tongaram qualified for his second Olympic team in 1960, seeded in the 8th 800 metres heat at the 1960 Olympics. He ran 1:57.1 to place 7th in his heat and did not advance.

At the 1961 SEAP Games, Tongaram won another gold medal in the 800 m and bronze in the relay. His 800 m winning time of 1:55.6 broke the Games record and was a personal best, while he led off the Thai 4 × 400 m relay team to place 3rd in 3:22.6.

Tongaram also represented Thailand at the 1962 Asian Games, this time only in the 400 m and 4 × 400 m as he did not start the 800 m. He finished 4th in his 400 m heat and 6th in his semi-final, running 50.69 seconds. In the relay, he anchored his team to another 5th-place finals finish.

== Personal life ==
Tongaram is from Bangkok, Thailand. He attended the National College of Physical Education at the University of Manila. He was also experienced in judo as a brown belt. He played multiple other sports in addition to athletics, including soccer, boxing, swimming, table tennis, gymnastics, sword and pole fighting, and softball.

He also became a coach as well as an athlete. He coached the Thai teams at the 1959 SEAP Games and 1961 SEAP Games.

From 1966 to 1969, Tongaram taught at Kasetsart University. During the last two years of his tenure, he also taught physical education at the Police Academy of Thailand and was a referee and judge at the Lumpinee Boxing Stadium. In October 1969, he became the assistant director of physical education at the YMCA in Bridgeport, Connecticut.
