= Aquatics at the 1967 SEAP Games =

Aquatics at the 1967 Southeast Asian Peninsular Games included swimming, diving, and waterpolo events. The sports of aquatics were held at Bangkok, Thailand. Aquatics events was held between 12 December to 15 December.

== Swimming ==
Men's events

Event	Gold		Silver		Bronze	
100 m freestyle	Singapore (SIN) Tan Thuan Heng	56.7	Thailand (THA) Narong Chok Unmuay	59.0	Thailand (THA) D. Kongcharoen	59.5
200 m freestyle	Singapore (SIN) Tan Thuan Heng	2:05.5	Thailand (THA) D. Kongcharoen	2:12.7	Singapore (SIN) Daniel Howe	2:21.2
400 m freestyle	Singapore (SIN) Tan Thuan Heng	4:34.9	Thailand (THA) D. Kongcharoen	4:48.6	Burma (BIR) Aung Hlain Win	4:54.1
1500 m freestyle	Singapore (SIN) Tan Thuan Heng	19:21.1	Malaysia (MAS) Chan Chee Seng	19:37.1	Thailand (THA) S. Jutuporn	20:11.0
100 m backstroke	Singapore (SIN) Alex Chan	1:06.3	Burma (BIR) Ohn Thwin	1:09.6	Malaysia (MAS) Leong Wei Tat	1:10.8
200 m backstroke	Singapore (SIN) Alex Chan	2:29.3	Burma (BIR) Ohn Thwin	2:33.5	Malaysia (MAS) Leong Wei Tat	2:35.1
100 m breaststroke	Malaysia (MAS) Wong Fu Kang		Malaysia (MAS) Ong Lay Sinn	1:16.9	Thailand (THA) V. Klambonjong	1:17.6
200 m breaststroke	Thailand (THA) Somchai Purgchaipaew	2:43.9	Malaysia (MAS) Yek Bee Yong	2:51.3	Thailand (THA) V. Klambonjong	2:52.1
100 m butterfly	Burma (BIR) Aung Hlain Win	1:03.3	Thailand (THA) Narong Chok Unmuay	1:03.3	Thailand (THA) Vichian Magtanaroong	
200 m butterfly	Singapore (SIN) Alex Chan	2:22.6	Thailand (THA) Vichian Magtanaroong	2:23.2	Burma (BIR) Nanda Kyaw Zwa	2:29.3
400 m individual medley	Singapore (SIN) Alex Chan	5:17.6	Burma (BIR) Nanda Kyaw Zwa	5:23.7	Thailand (THA) Narok Chok Unmuay	5:30.0
4 × 100 m freestyle relay	Thailand (THA)	3:54.3	Singapore (SIN)	4:01.4	Burma (BIR)	4:07.2
4 × 200 m freestyle relay	Thailand (THA)	9:07.1	Singapore (SIN)	9:08.7	Burma (BIR)	9:29.9
4 × 100 m medley relay	Thailand (THA)	4:23.5	Singapore (SIN)	4:32.0	Burma (BIR)	4:35.7

Women's events

Event	Gold		Silver		Bronze	
100 m freestyle	Singapore (SIN) Patricia Chan	1:07.1	Thailand (THA) Pacharine Tangtanakul	1:09.4	Singapore (SIN) Molly Tay Chin Say	1:10.4
200 m freestyle	Singapore (SIN) Patricia Chan	2:26.3	Singapore (SIN) Molly Tay Chin Say	2:33.5	Thailand (THA) Panarai Krisnaraja	2:36.4
400 m freestyle	Singapore (SIN) Patricia Chan	5:01.5	Thailand (THA) Panarai Krisnaraja	5:26.8	Burma (BIR) Mary Soe	5:41.1
100 m backstroke	Singapore (SIN) Patricia Chan	1:15.2	Singapore (SIN) Molly Tay Chin Say	1:17.7	Thailand (THA) Pacharine Tangtanakul	1:17.7
200 m backstroke	Singapore (SIN) Patricia Chan	2:45.0	Thailand (THA) Pacharine Tangtanakul	2:49.9	Singapore (SIN) Molly Tay Chin Say	2:50.5
100 m breaststroke	Thailand (THA) Chintana Thongratana	1:23.2	Thailand (THA) Amphai Imphang	1:27.3	Burma (BIR) Polly Ba San	1:27.7
200 m breaststroke	Thailand (THA) Chintana Thongratana	2:58.2	Burma (BIR) Polly Ba San	3:09.1	Thailand (THA) Amphai Imphang	3:10.9
100 m butterfly	Singapore (SIN) Patricia Chan	1:13.1	Singapore (SIN) Tay Chin Joo	1:18.3	Burma (BIR) Mya Mya Win	1:21.0
200 m butterfly	Singapore (SIN) Patricia Chan	2:46.7	Singapore (SIN) Tay Chin Joo	2:54.8	Thailand (THA) V. Purngkaserkitt	3:20.0
200 m individual medley	Singapore (SIN) Patricia Chan	2:45.7	Burma (BIR) Mya Mya Win	2:56.8	Singapore (SIN) Tay Chin Joo	2:58.6
4 × 100 m freestyle relay	Singapore (SIN)	4:43.5	Thailand (THA)	4:47.9	Burma (BIR)	4:54.9
4 × 100 m medley relay	Singapore (SIN)	5:12.3	Thailand (THA)	5:13.8	Burma (BIR)	5:19.5
