= Bhodi Sooknoi =

Thai boxer

Personal information
- Nationality: Thai
- Born: 20 July 1938; Bangkok, Thailand
- Died: 2023 (aged 84–85)

Sport
- Sport: Boxing

Bhodi Sooknoi (Thai: โพธิ์ สุขน้อย; 20 July 1938 – 2023) was a Thai boxer and Royal Thai Air Force wing commander. He won silver in the men's featherweight event at the inaugural 1959 SEAP Games in Bangkok, and competed in the men's lightweight event at the 1960 Summer Olympics in Rome. At the Olympics, he lost to Richard McTaggart of Great Britain by decision in the Round of 32 after receiving a bye in the Round of 64.
