= Somnuek Srisombat =

Thai middle-distance runner

Somnuek Srisombati
Personal information
- Nationality: Thai
- Born: 12 October 1932 (age 93) Surat Thani, Thailand

Sport
- Sport: Middle-distance running
- Event: 1500 metres
Medal record
Men's athletics
Representing Thailand
Southeast Asian Games
Gold medal – first place	1959 Bangkok	10000 m

Somnuek Srisombat (born 12 October 1932) is a Thai middle-distance runner. He competed in the men's 1500 metres at the 1956 Summer Olympics.
