= Somchai Limpichat =

Thai swimmer

Personal information
- Born: 10 December 1940 (age 85)

Sport
- Sport: Swimming
Medal record
Representing Thailand
Asian Games
Bronze medal – third place	1966 Bangkok	4x200m freestyle relay
SEA Games
Gold medal – first place	1965 Kuala Lumpur	4x200m freestyle relay
Bronze medal – third place	1965 Kuala Lumpur	100m freestyle

Somchai Limpichat (born 10 December 1940) is a Thai former swimmer. He competed in the men's 100 metre freestyle at the 1964 Summer Olympics.
