= Michael Eu =

Malaysian swimmer (born 1946)

Personal information
- Full name: Seong Chin Eu
- Born: 26 September 1946 (age 79)
- Height: 178 cm (5 ft 10 in)
- Weight: 63 kg (139 lb)

Sport
- Sport: Swimming
- Club: Chinese Swimming Club (Singapore)
Medal record
Men's swimming
Representing Singapore
Asian Games
Bronze medal – third place	1966 Bangkok	100 m backstroke
SEA Games
Gold medal – first place	1965 Kuala Lumpur	100m backstroke
Gold medal – first place	1965 Kuala Lumpur	200m backstroke
Gold medal – first place	1965 Kuala Lumpur	4x100m medley relay

Michael Eu (born 26 September 1946) is a Malaysian former swimmer. He competed in two events at the 1964 Summer Olympics.
