= Chan Ah Kow =

Singaporean swimming coach

Chan Ah Kow (陈亚九, 1912 – 10 March 1996) was a Singaporean swimming coach.

== Family ==
Chan was noted for his experimental training methods; though he had little swimming experience himself, he trained his children extensively, helping them go on to dominate swimming in Southeast Asia in the 1960s and 1970s. In particular, his youngest daughter Patricia Chan Li-yin would earn numerous gold medals for Singapore at the Southeast Asian Games, earning her the moniker "Singapore's Golden Girl". Another daughter of his, Victoria Lye-hua Chan-Palay, went on to prominence as a neuroscientist in the United States and Switzerland. His son Roy Chan Kum Wah attended the Anglo-Chinese School, where aside from distinction in swimming (he was part of the men's 4 × 200 m relay team that won a bronze medal at the 1970 Asian Games) he also achieved excellent academic results, earning him a President's Scholarship. Two other sons Alex Chan Meng Wah and Bernard Chan Cheng Wah were also swimmers, the latter representing Singapore at the 1966 Asian Games. The other son Mark Chan later became a composer. One of his granddaughters Marina Chan is also an international swimmer.

Chan was jointly awarded the Singapore National Olympic Council's first coach of the year award when it was instituted in 1970, along with Tan Eng Yoon and Ang Teck Bee; he would go on to receive it again as sole winner in 1971 and 1972.

== House ==
Chan moved into a villa on 55,000 square feet (5,100 m^{2}) of land in Mountbatten Road in the 1940s, and raised his family there. It was a local landmark known as the "Chan Villa". The Urban Development Authority gave it conservation status in 1993. After Chan's death, his family sold the property to Simon Cheong of SC Global Development in 2004 for SG$11 million.
