= Suthi Manyakass =

Thai sprinter

Personal information
- Nationality: Thai
- Born: 10 August 1938 (age 87)

Sport
- Sport: Sprinting
- Event: 100 metres
Medal record
Men's athletics
Representing Thailand
South East Asian Peninsular Games
| Gold medal – first place | 1959 Bangkok | 100 m |
| Gold medal – first place | 1959 Bangkok | 200 m |
| Gold medal – first place | 1959 Bangkok | 4×100 m relay |

Suthi Manyakass (born 10 August 1938) is a Thai sprinter. He competed in the 100 metres at the 1960 Summer Olympics and the 1964 Summer Olympics.
