= Roy Chan =

Singaporean swimmer (born 1955)

Personal information
- Full name: Roy Chan Kum Wah
- Born: 28 November 1955 (age 70) Colony of Singapore

Sport
- Sport: Swimming

Roy Chan Kum Wah (born 28 November 1955) is a Singaporean former swimmer and skin doctor. He competed at the 1972 Summer Olympics in the 100 m and 200 m butterfly and 200 m medley events, but failed to reach the finals. He was part of the 4×200 m relay team that won a bronze medal at the 1970 Asian Games.

== Education ==
Chan attended the Anglo-Chinese School. He was awarded the President's Scholarship in 1974 and went on to study at the University of Singapore.

== Swimming career ==
Chan and his siblings were coached by their father, Chan Ah Kow.

Chan won the bronze medal at the 4 × 200 m freestyle relay at the 1970 Asian Games.

At the 1971 Southeast Asian Peninsular Games, Chan won three gold medals at the 100 m butterfly, 200 m butterfly and 400 m individual medley.

On 27 April 1973, Chan broke the national record for 400 m individual medley during an international meet between Indonesia and Singapore.

Chan competed at the 1972 Summer Olympics.

== Medical career ==
In 1988, Chan joined the National Skin Centre as a skin doctor. He also founded a charity Action for Aids in the same year.

In 2016, Chan was awarded the National Outstanding Clinician Award, part of the National Medical Excellence Awards given out by the Ministry of Health.

== Personal life ==
Chan's siblings were also national swimmers for Singapore, Patricia Chan, Alex Chan Meng Wah and Bernard Chan Cheng Wah His other brother Mark Chan is a composer, whereas his other sister Victoria Chan-Palay became a prominent neuroscientist in the United States and Switzerland.

Chan's niece Marina Chan is also an national swimmer for Singapore.
