= Prak Samnang =

Cambodian swimmer

Personal information
- Born: 1 January 1949 (age 77)

Sport
- Sport: Swimming
Medal record
Representing Khmer Republic
Asian Games
Bronze medal – third place	1970 Bangkok	4×100 m freestyle
SEA Games
Silver medal – second place	1973 Singapore	100 m freestyle
Silver medal – second place	1973 Singapore	4×100 m freestyle
Silver medal – second place	1973 Singapore	4×200 m freestyle
Silver medal – second place	1973 Singapore	4×100 m medley

Prak Samnang (born 1 January 1949) is a Cambodian former freestyle swimmer. He competed in three events at the 1972 Summer Olympics. He won a bronze medal in the 4 x 100 metre freestyle relay at the 1970 Asian Games.
