= Aquatics at the 1965 SEAP Games =

Aquatics at the 1965 Southeast Asian Peninsular Games included swimming, diving, and waterpolo events. The sports of aquatics were held at Kuala Lumpur, Malaysia. Aquatics events was held between 15 December to 18 December.

== Swimming ==
Men's events

Event	Gold		Silver		Bronze	
100 m freestyle	(Singapore) Tan Thuan Heng	57.9 (rec)	(Cambodia) Tieng Sok	58.5	(Thailand) Somchai Limpichat	1:00.3
200 m freestyle	(Singapore) Tan Thuan Heng	2:07.9	(Myanmar) Tin Maung Ni	2:10.5	(Cambodia) Tieng Sok	2:14.1
400 m freestyle	(Singapore) Tan Thuan Heng	4:33.4	(Myanmar) Tin Maung Ni	4:33.7	(Malaysia) Chan Chee Seng	4:52.2
1500 m freestyle	(Myanmar) Tin Maung Ni	18:17.6	(Singapore) Tan Thuan Heng	18:54.6	(Malaysia) Chan Chee Seng	19:46.4
100 m backstroke	(Singapore) Michael Eu	1:07.9	(Singapore) Alex Chan	1:10.2	(Cambodia) Hem Thon	1:11.4
200 m backstroke	(Singapore) Michael Eu	2:30.7	(Cambodia) Hem Thon	2:33.5	(Singapore) Alex Chan	2:33.6
100 m breaststroke	(Cambodia) Phath Sam Onn	1:15.6	(Cambodia) Mak Om	1:16.7	(Thailand) Somchai Purchaipaew	1:17.4
200 m breaststroke	(Cambodia) Phath Sam Onn	2:48.8	(Thailand) Somchai Purchaipaew	2:50.9	(Malaysia) Chong Teck Cheng	2:51.3
100 m butterfly	(Singapore) Bernard Chan	1:04.5 (rec)	(Myanmar) Maung Nyan	1:05.2	(Cambodia) Var Nay Oeun	1:05.6
200 m butterfly	(Thailand) Vichian Magtanaroong	2:31.0	(Singapore) Alex Chan	2:31.4	(Thailand) Narong Chokumnuay	2:32.6
400 m individual medley	(Singapore) Tan Thuan Heng	5:25.1	(Thailand) Narong Chokumnuay	5:30.5	(Myanmar) Nanda Kyaw Zwa	5:35.2
4 × 200 m freestyle relay	Thailand Somchai Limpichat; Anant Pleanboonlers; Narong Chokumnuay; Duang Kongcharon	9:07.5 (rec)	Singapore	9:11.9	Cambodia	9:12.1
4 × 100 m medley relay	Singapore Michael Eu; Kenneth Kee; Keng Siong Beng; Tan Thuan Heng	4:28.3	Cambodia	4:30.1	Thailand	4:35.4

Women's events

Event	Gold		Silver		Bronze	
100 m freestyle	(Singapore) Patricia Chan	1:08.8	(Singapore) Jovina Tseng	1:11.1	(South Vietnam) Nguyen Thi Tuyet Van	1:12.9
200 m freestyle	(Singapore) Patricia Chan	2:36.3	(Singapore) Molly Tay	2:38.1	(Myanmar) Sally Soe	2:42.6
400 m freestyle	(Singapore) Patricia Chan	5:28.3	(Myanmar) Mary Soe	5:48.6	(Singapore) Molly Tay	5:55.0
100 m backstroke	(Cambodia) Chuon Kun	1:18.7	(Singapore) Molly Tay	1:19.0	(Singapore) Jovina Tseng	1:19.6
200 m backstroke	(Cambodia) Chuon Kun	2:49.4	(Singapore) Molly Tay	2:52.6	(Singapore) Jovina Tseng	2:58.9
100 m breaststroke	(Thailand) Chintana Thongratana	1:27.3	(Thailand) Umbhai Inphang	1:30.1	(Cambodia) Pech Vanna	1:30.8
200 m breaststroke	(Thailand) Chintana Thongrat	3:06.3	(Cambodia) Pech Vanna	3:09.4	(Myanmar) Polly Ba San	3:13.5
100 m butterfly	(Singapore) Patricia Chan	1:14.3	(Singapore) Jovina Tseng	1:14.8	(Myanmar) Mya Mya Win	1:23.4
200 m butterfly	(Singapore) Patricia Chan	2:53.9	(Singapore) Jovina Tseng	2:57.5	(Myanmar) Mya Mya Win	3:08.6
200 m individual medley	(Singapore) Patricia Chan	2:52.9	(Singapore) Jovina Tseng	2:58.3	(Cambodia) Chuon Kun	3:02.1
4 × 100 m freestyle relay	Singapore Jovina Tseng; Tay Chin Joo; Nora Tay; Patricia Chan	4:58.4 (rec)	Cambodia	5:14.2	Burma	5:15.8
4 × 100 m medley relay	Singapore	5:27.9	Cambodia	5:35.1	Burma	5:42.5

== Diving ==
Event	Gold		Silver		Bronze	
Men's springboard	(Singapore) Hui Peng Seng	140.53 pts	(Thailand) S. Oonsanit	127.56	(Thailand) Chaowalit Limtrakul	124.07
Men's highboard	(Thailand) Chaowalit Limtrakul	94.44 pts	(Thailand) Suthi Panitchareonnam	87.65	(Malaysia) Chan Peng Kuang	82.33
Women's springboard	(Thailand) Verachit Tungkitsuk	86.97 pts	(Singapore) Nora Tay	84.98		
Women's highboard	(Thailand) Verachit Tungkitsuk	42.92 pts				

== Waterpolo ==
Event	Gold	Silver	Bronze
Men's water polo	Singapore	Malaysia	Thailand

== Medal table ==
Rank	Nation	Gold	Silver	Bronze	Total
1	Singapore (SIN)	18	12	4	34
2	Thailand (THA)	7	5	6	18
3	Cambodia (CAM)	4	7	6	17
4	Burma (BIR)	1	4	7	12
5	Malaysia (MAS)	0	1	4	5
6	South Vietnam (VNM)	0	0	1	1
Totals (6 entries)		30	29	28	87
