= Swimming at the 1959 SEAP Games =

Swimming at the 1st Southeast Asian Peninsular Games
- Dates: 14–16 December 1959
- No. of events: 7

Swimming at the 1959 SEAP Games was held in Bangkok, Thailand. The competition featured 7 male events swum in a long course (50m) pool.

== Results ==
Event	Gold		Silver		Bronze	
100 m freestyle	Tin Maung Ni; Burma (BIR)	1:00.2; GR	Mya Thee; Burma (BIR)		Tan Cheow Choon; Singapore (SIN)	1:00.9
200 m freestyle	Tin Maung Ni; Burma (BIR)	2:17.7; GR	Mya Thee; Burma (BIR)	2:22.4	Tan Cheow Choon; Singapore (SIN)	2:24.8
100 m backstroke	Lim Heng Chek; Malaya (MAL)	1:11.5; GR	Tat Thang; Vietnam (VIE)	1:15.1	Tan Gek Kee; Singapore (SIN)	1:15.5
100 m breaststroke	Truong Ke Nhon; Vietnam (VIE)	1:20.6; GR	Seah Pong Pin; Singapore (SIN)	1:21.0	Koay Thian Soon; Malaya (MAL)	
100 m butterfly	Lim Heng Chek; Malaya (MAL)	1:13.5; GR	Seah Pong Pin; Singapore (SIN)	1:13.7	Phan Huu Dong; Vietnam (VIE)	
4×100 m freestyle relay	Singapore (SIN)	4:14.4; GR	Burma (BIR)	4:18.1	Thailand (THA)	4:40.9
4×100 m medley relay	Vietnam (VIE)	4:55.4; GR	Malaya (MAS)		Thailand (THA)	

== Medal table ==
Rank	Nation	Gold	Silver	Bronze	Total
1	Burma (BIR)	2	3	0	5
2	Malaya (MAL)	2	1	1	4
2	Vietnam (VIE)	2	1	1	4
4	Singapore (SIN)	1	2	3	6
5	Thailand (THA)	0	0	2	2
Totals (5 entries)		7	7	7	21
