= Marlar =

Marlar is a surname. Notable people with the surname include:

- Henry Marlar, 15th-century English politician
- Mike Marlar (born 1978), American professional dirt track and stock car racing driver
- Robin Marlar (1931–2022), English cricketer and cricket journalist
