= Tan Thuan Heng =

Singaporean swimmer and water polo player

Personal information
- Born: 14 July 1948 (age 77)

Sport
- Sport: Swimming
Medal record
Men's swimming
Representing Singapore
Asian Games
Silver medal – second place	1966 Bangkok	200 m freestyle
Silver medal – second place	1966 Bangkok	400 m freestyle
Bronze medal – third place	1970 Bangkok	100 m freestyle
Bronze medal – third place	1970 Bangkok	4×200 m freestyle
Southeast Asian Peninsular Games
Gold medal – first place	1965 Kuala Lumpur	100 m freestyle
Gold medal – first place	1965 Kuala Lumpur	200 m freestyle
Gold medal – first place	1965 Kuala Lumpur	400 m freestyle
Gold medal – first place	1965 Kuala Lumpur	400 m medley
Gold medal – first place	1967 Bangkok	100 m freestyle
Gold medal – first place	1967 Bangkok	200 m freestyle
Gold medal – first place	1967 Bangkok	400 m freestyle
Gold medal – first place	1967 Bangkok	1500 m freestyle
Gold medal – first place	1969 Rangoon	100 m freestyle
Gold medal – first place	1969 Rangoon	200 m freestyle
Gold medal – first place	1969 Rangoon	400 m freestyle
Gold medal – first place	1973 Singapore	100 m freestyle
Gold medal – first place	1973 Singapore	4×100 m freestyle
Gold medal – first place	1973 Singapore	4×100 m medley
Gold medal – first place	1975 Bangkok	100 m freestyle
Silver medal – second place	1961 Rangoon	400 m freestyle
Silver medal – second place	1961 Rangoon	1500 m freestyle
Silver medal – second place	1965 Kuala Lumpur	1500 m freestyle
Bronze medal – third place	1961 Rangoon	200 m freestyle
Men's water polo
Representing Singapore
Asian Games
Silver medal – second place	1966 Bangkok	Team

Tan Thuan Heng (born 14 July 1948) is a Malaysian and Singaporean former swimmer and water polo player. He competed in four swimming events at the 1964 Summer Olympics for Malaysia. Later, he competed in the 1966 Asian Games and 1970 Asian Games for Singapore.
