= Shahrudin Mohd Ali =

Malaysian sprinter (born 1941)

Shahrudin Mohamed Ali
Personal information
- Nationality: Malaysian
- Born: 5 May 1941 (age 85) Klang, Federated Malay States
- Height: 170 cm (5 ft 7 in)
- Weight: 62 kg (137 lb)

Sport
- Sport: Sprinting
- Event(s): 100 metres 200 metres
Medal record
Men's athletics
Representing Malaya
Asian Games
Bronze medal – third place	1962 Jakarta	4 x 100 m Relay
South East Asian Peninsular Games
Silver medal – second place	1959 Bangkok	100 m
Silver medal – second place	1959 Bangkok	200 m

Shahrudin Mohd Ali (born 5 May 1941) is a Malaysian former athlete and retired air force officer. Shahrudin represented Malaya in the men's 100 metres and 200 metres at the 1960 Summer Olympics. He later became deputy chief of the Royal Malaysian Air Force (RMAF), reaching the rank of major general.

== Early life ==
Shahrudin was born in Klang in 1941 and attended Malacca High School.

== Military career ==
Shahrudin enlisted in the Royal Federation of Malaya Air Force (later known as the Royal Malaysian Air Force) in 1960, the same year he competed at the Olympics. He entered as a cadet officer and trained at the Federation Military College in Port Dickson, which prepared elite officer candidates for military leadership roles.

He was trained as a fighter pilot and flew a variety of military aircraft during his service. Over the course of a career spanning more than three decades, Shahrudin held a number of senior operational and command positions within the RMAF, and was involved in shaping the development of Malaysia's air force during its formative years following independence.

He rose through the ranks and ultimately attained the rank of Major General, among the highest positions within the air force, serving as Deputy Chief of the RMAF.

Following his retirement from active duty, Shahrudin remained active in defence circles, contributing to veterans’ welfare initiatives and representing Malaysia in regional military forums. He was also known for promoting physical fitness and sports among service personnel well into his later years.

== Sport career ==
At the 1959 Southeast Asian Peninsular Games, Shahrudin won silver medals in the 100m and 200m events.

Shahrudin was Malaya's flagbearer at the 1960 Summer Olympics. He competed in the men's 100 metres and 200 metres events.

In 1962, Shahrudin won a bronze medal as part of Malaya's 4 x 100m relay team at the 1962 Asian Games.

A keen rugby union player, Shahrudin helped found the RMAF Blackhawks Rugby Club and later served as vice-president of the Malaysian Rugby Union.

In 2012, Shahrudin was inducted into the Olympic Council of Malaysia's hall of fame.
