= Tipapan Leenasen =

Thai high jumper

Personal information
- Nationality: Thai
- Born: 9 September 1943 (age 82)

Sport
- Sport: Athletics
- Event: High jump

Tipapan Leenasen (born 9 September 1943) is a Thai athlete. She competed in the women's high jump at the 1964 Summer Olympics.
