= Sarun Van =

Cambodian swimmer

Personal information
- Born: 4 May 1949 (age 77)

Sport
- Sport: Swimming
Medal record
Representing Khmer Republic
SEA Games
Gold medal – first place	1971 Kuala Lumpur	100m backstroke
Gold medal – first place	1971 Kuala Lumpur	200m backstroke
Silver medal – second place	1973 Singapore	200m backstroke]]
Silver medal – second place	1973 Singapore	4x100m medley relay
Bronze medal – third place	1973 Singapore	100m backstroke

Sarun Van (born 5 May 1949) is a Cambodian former backstroke swimmer. He competed in three events at the 1972 Summer Olympics.
