= 1971 SEAP Games =

Multi-sport event in Kuala Lumpur, Malaysia

6th Southeast Asian Peninsular Games
- Host city: Kuala Lumpur, Malaysia
- Nations: 7
- Sport: 15
- Opening: 11 December 1971
- Closing: 18 December 1971
- Opened by: Abdul Halim; Yang di-Pertuan Agong
- Torch lighter: Mani Jegathesan
- Ceremony venue: Stadium Merdeka

The 1971 Southeast Asian Peninsular Games, officially known as the 6th Southeast Asian Peninsular Games, were a Southeast Asian multi-sport event held in Kuala Lumpur, Malaysia from 11 to 18 December 1971 with 15 sports featured in the games. In this edition of the games, host country Malaysia joined Singapore in pressuring Thailand to let the SEAP Games Federation expand to include the Philippines and Indonesia, but to no avail. Thai officials felt that such expansion would be contrary to the small family affair they had intended the games to be, and would not be in keeping with the close-neighbours spirit the games was supposed to cultivate. This was the second time Malaysia hosted the games and its first time since 1965. The games was opened and closed by Abdul Halim, the King of Malaysia at the Stadium Merdeka. The final medal tally was led by Thailand, followed by host Malaysia and Singapore.

== The games ==
=== Participating nations ===
- Burma
- Khmer Republic
- Laos
- Malaysia (host)
- Singapore
- South Vietnam
- Thailand

=== Sports ===
- Aquatics
- Athletics
- Badminton
- Basketball
- Boxing
- Cycling
- Football
- Hockey
- Judo
- Sepak takraw
- Shooting
- Table tennis
- Tennis
- Volleyball
- Weightlifting

=== Aquatics ===
Aquatics included swimming, diving and water polo events. The three sports of aquatics were held in Kuala Lumpur, Malaysia. Aquatics events was held between 12 and 15 December.

==== Swimming ====
Men's events

Event	Gold		Silver		Bronze	
100 m freestyle	(Singapore) Tan Thuan Heng	57.05	(Khmer Republic) Tan Bun Thay	57.43	(Myanmar) Aung Hlain Win	59.25
200 m freestyle	(Singapore) Tan Thuan Heng	2:07.10	(Khmer Republic) Tan Bun Thay	2:08.54	(Khmer Republic) Eat Kim Heng	2:09.90
400 m freestyle	(Singapore) Tan Thuan Heng	4:41.82	(Khmer Republic) Eat Kim Heng	4:43.40	(Malaysia) Liew Chun Wei	4:43.40
1500 m freestyle	(Malaysia) Liew Chun Wei	18:43.55	(Khmer Republic) Tan Bun Thay	18:58.98	(Singapore) Mark Chan	18:59.61
100 m backstroke	(Khmer Republic) Van Sarun	1:04.96	(Singapore) Alex Chan	1:06.65	(Malaysia) Chiang Jin Choon	1:06.72
200 m backstroke	(Khmer Republic) Van Sarun	2:20.34	(Malaysia) Chiang Jin Choon	2:24.77	(Khmer Republic) Hem Thon	2:28.49
100 m breaststroke	(Khmer Republic) Phat Sin Onn	1:10.84	(Khmer Republic) Ung Meng Tay	1:12.31	(Singapore) Khong Kok Sun	1:14.12
200 m breaststroke	(Khmer Republic) Phat Sin Onn	2:38.04	(Khmer Republic) Yi Sokhon	2:43.13	(Singapore) Alan R. Lelah	2:44.21
100 m butterfly	(Singapore) Roy Chan	1:02.43	(Myanmar) Nanda Kyaw Zwa	1:02.63	(Myanmar) Aung Hlain Win	1:05.07
200 m butterfly	(Singapore) Roy Chan	2:20.33	(Myanmar) Nanda Kyaw Zwa	2:20.67	(Malaysia) Leong Khong Loong	2:27.03
400 m individual medley	(Singapore) Roy Chan	5:11.93	(Malaysia) Chiang Jin Choon	5:21.69	(Khmer Republic) Poey Sam Mang	5:24.01
4 × 100 m freestyle relay	Singapore	3:51.13	Khmer Republic	3:51.90	(Myanmar) Burma	3:59.56
4 × 200 m freestyle relay	Singapore	8:46.21	(Myanmar) Burma	9:01.82	Malaysia	9:07.21
4 × 100 m medley relay	Khmer Republic	4:17.87	Singapore	4:20.44	Malaysia	4:29.95

Women's events

Event	Gold		Silver		Bronze	
100 m freestyle	(Singapore) Patricia Chan	1:04.74	(Thailand) Panarai Krisnaraja	1:06.32	(Singapore) Elaine Sng	1:06.38
200 m freestyle	(Singapore) Patricia Chan	2:21.62	(Singapore) Elaine Sng	2:23.55	(Thailand) Panarai Krisnaraja	2:24.59
400 m freestyle	(Singapore) Patricia Chan	5:01.39	(Thailand) Panarai Krisnaraja	5:02.77	(Singapore) Elaine Sng	5:08.95
800 m freestyle	(Singapore) Lim Bee Lian	10:52.20	(Malaysia) Lim Lay Choo	11:01.57	(Malaysia) Ng Cheng	11:17.58
100 m backstroke	(Malaysia) Ong Mei Lin	1:14.72	(Singapore) Lim Bee Lian	1:16.10	(Singapore) May Lau	1:17.15
200 m backstroke	(Singapore) May Lau	2:40.53	(Malaysia) Ong Mei Lin	2:42.95	(Malaysia) Christina Lam Po Leng	2:52.58
100 m breaststroke	(Singapore) Khong Yiu Lan	1:26.69	(Malaysia) Rosanna Lim Ai Leng	1:28.60	(Malaysia) Lim Yit Bin	1:29.49
200 m breaststroke	(Singapore) Khong Yiu Lan	3:04.04	(Singapore) Esther Tan	3:04.84	(Malaysia) Rosanna Lim Ai Leng	3:08.57
100 m butterfly	(Singapore) Tay Chin Joo	1:11.30	(Singapore) Karen Chong	1:17.42	(Malaysia) Jean de Bruyne	1:22.75
200 m butterfly	(Singapore) Tay Chin Joo	2:41.94	(Singapore) Karen Chong	2:47.61	(Malaysia) Jean de Bruyne	3:00.03
200 m individual medley	(Malaysia) Ong Mei Lin	2:46.38	(Singapore) Tay Chin Joo	2:47.26	(Singapore) Lim Bee Lian	2:47.66
4 × 100 m freestyle relay	Singapore	4:32.63	Malaysia	4:51.66	Not awarded (only 2 competitors)	
4 × 100 m medley relay	Singapore	5:00.70	Malaysia	5:24.10	Not awarded (only 2 competitors)	

==== Diving ====
Diving

Event	Gold		Silver		Bronze	
Men's springboard	(Malaysia) Chan Chee Keong	386.76	(Thailand) Somjit Ongkasing	381.84	(Thailand) Boonchai Tse Loh	333.60
Men's high diving	(Malaysia) Teo Cheng Kiat	291.96	(Thailand) Vetasak Parnchsako	281.97	(Khmer Republic) You Huat	273.06
Women's springboard	(Singapore) Nora Tay	271.77	(Malaysia) Gillian Chew	260.10	(Thailand) Tasnee Srivipattana	252.51
Women's high diving	(Thailand) Tasnee Srivipattana	245.82	(Thailand) Vorachit Tungkitsuk	160.98	Not awarded (only 2 competitors)	

==== Water polo ====
Water polo

Event	Gold	Silver	Bronze
Men's team	Singapore	Malaysia	Thailand

=== Medal table ===
Key

* Host nation (Malaysia)

Rank	Nation	Gold	Silver	Bronze	Total
1	Thailand (THA)	44	27	38	109
2	Malaysia (MAS)*	41	43	55	139
3	Singapore (SIN)	32	33	31	96
4	Burma (BIR)	20	28	13	61
5	Khmer Republic (KHM)	17	18	18	53
6	South Vietnam (VNM)	3	6	9	18
7	Laos (LAO)	0	1	4	5
Totals (7 entries)		157	156	168	481

Preceded by Rangoon	Southeast Asian Peninsular Games; Kuala Lumpur; VI Southeast Asian Peninsular Games (1971)	Succeeded by Singapore
