= Lim Heng Chek =

Malaysian swimmer (1936–2021)

Personal information
- Born: 1936
- Died: 15 May 2021 (aged 85) Petaling Jaya, Malaysia

Sport
- Sport: Swimming
Medal record
Men's swimming
Representing Malaysia
Southeast Asian Peninsular Games
Gold medal – first place	1959 Bangkok	100 m backstroke
Gold medal – first place	1959 Bangkok	100 m butterfly
Silver medal – second place	1961 Rangoon	100 m backstroke

Lim Heng Chek (1936 – 15 May 2021) was a Malaysian swimmer. He competed in the men's 100 metre backstroke at the 1956 Summer Olympics.
