= Jovina Tseng =

Malaysian swimmer

Personal information
- Born: 6 May 1950 (age 76)

Sport
- Sport: Swimming
Medal record
Representing Singapore
Asian Games
Silver medal – second place	1970 Bangkok	4x100m freestyle relay
Bronze medal – third place	1966 Bangkok	4x100m freestyle relay
SEA Games
Gold medal – first place	1965 Kuala Lumpur	4x100m freestyle relay
Silver medal – second place	1965 Kuala Lumpur	100m freestyle
Silver medal – second place	1965 Kuala Lumpur	100m butterfly
Silver medal – second place	1965 Kuala Lumpur	200m butterfly
Silver medal – second place	1965 Kuala Lumpur	200m individual medley
Bronze medal – third place	1965 Kuala Lumpur	100m backstroke
Bronze medal – third place	1965 Kuala Lumpur	200m backstroke

Jovina Tseng (born 6 May 1950) is a Malaysian former swimmer. She competed in three events at the 1964 Summer Olympics.
