= Pat Chan =

Singaporean swimmer (born 1954)

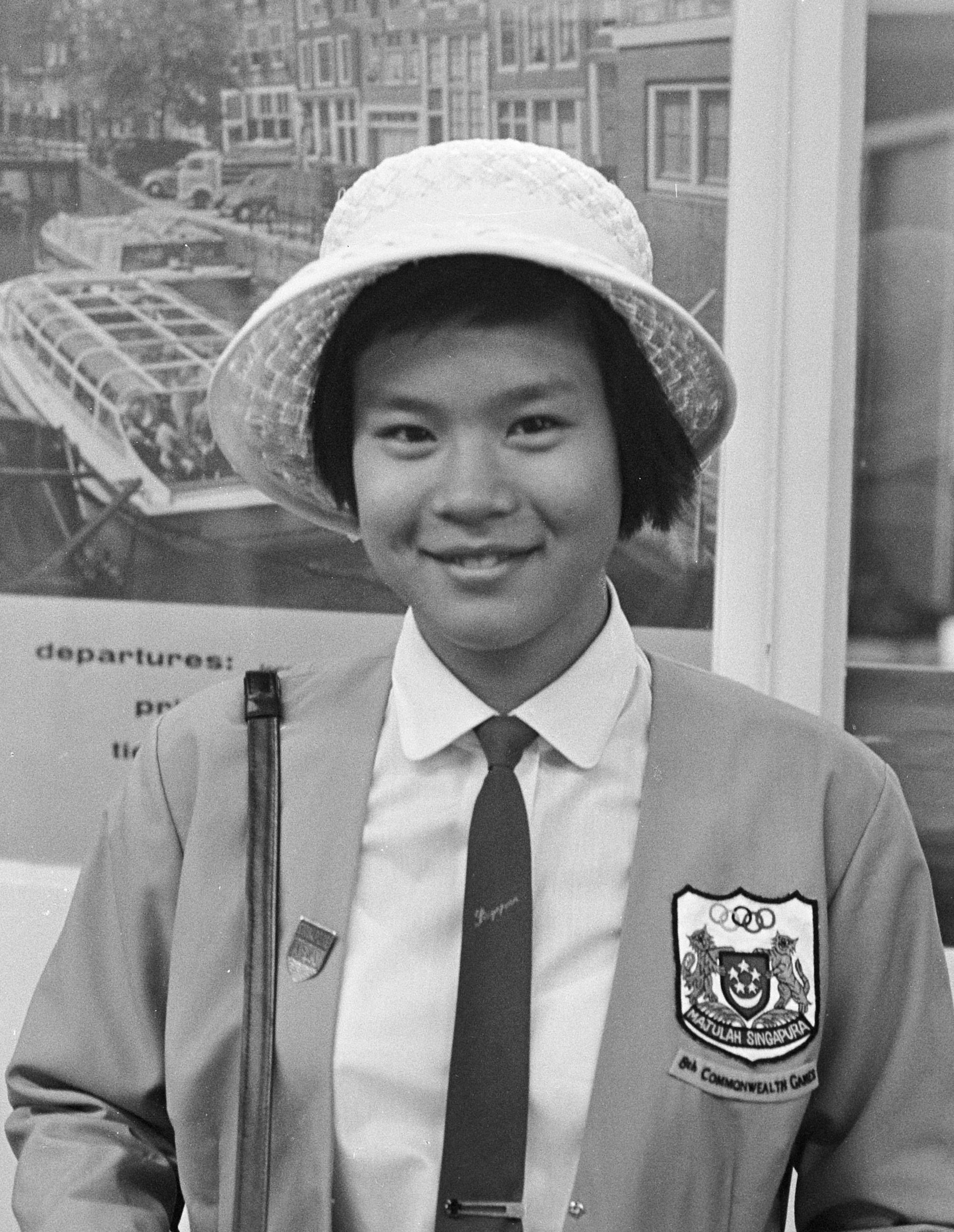
- Chan in 1966

Personal information
- Full name: Patricia Chan Li-Yin
- Nationality: Singapore
- Born: 12 April 1954 (age 72) Colony of Singapore
- Height: 1.73 m (5 ft 8 in)
- Weight: 64 kg (141 lb)

Sport
- Sport: Swimming
- Strokes: Backstroke, Freestyle, Medley
- Club: Chinese Swimming Club
Medal record
Women's swimming
Representing Singapore
Asian Games
Silver medal – second place	1970 Bangkok	400 m freestyle
Silver medal – second place	1970 Bangkok	4×100 m freestyle
Silver medal – second place	1970 Bangkok	4×100 m medley
Bronze medal – third place	1966 Bangkok	100 m backstroke
Bronze medal – third place	1966 Bangkok	200 m medley
Bronze medal – third place	1966 Bangkok	4×100 m freestyle
Bronze medal – third place	1970 Bangkok	100 m freestyle
Bronze medal – third place	1970 Bangkok	200 m freestyle
SEA Games
Gold medal – first place	1965 Kuala Lumpur	100m freestyle
Gold medal – first place	1965 Kuala Lumpur	200m freestyle
Gold medal – first place	1965 Kuala Lumpur	400m freestyle
Gold medal – first place	1965 Kuala Lumpur	100m butterfly
Gold medal – first place	1965 Kuala Lumpur	200m butterfly
Gold medal – first place	1965 Kuala Lumpur	200m individual medley
Gold medal – first place	1965 Kuala Lumpur	4x100m freestyle relay
Gold medal – first place	1967 Bangkok	100m freestyle
Gold medal – first place	1967 Bangkok	200m freestyle
Gold medal – first place	1967 Bangkok	400m freestyle
Gold medal – first place	1967 Bangkok	100m backstroke
Gold medal – first place	1967 Bangkok	200m backstroke
Gold medal – first place	1967 Bangkok	100m butterfly
Gold medal – first place	1967 Bangkok	200m butterfly
Gold medal – first place	1967 Bangkok	200m individual medley
Gold medal – first place	1971 Kuala Lumpur	100m freestyle
Gold medal – first place	1971 Kuala Lumpur	200m freestyle
Gold medal – first place	1971 Kuala Lumpur	400m freestyle
Gold medal – first place	1973 Singapore	100m freestyle
Gold medal – first place	1973 Singapore	100m backstroke
Gold medal – first place	1973 Singapore	200m backstroke
Gold medal – first place	1973 Singapore	200m individual medley
Gold medal – first place	1973 Singapore	4x100m freestyle relay
Gold medal – first place	1973 Singapore	4x100m medley relay

Patricia Chan Li-Yin (陈丽燕; born 12 April 1954), popularly known as Pat Chan and the "Golden Girl", is a retired swimmer from Singapore. Between 1965 and 1973 she won 39 gold medals at Southeast Asian Games, which was the best achievement for a Singaporean athlete in any sport until 2005. She competed in eight events at the 1966 and 1970 Asian Games and won 3 silver and 5 bronze medals. At the 1970 Games she set a national record in the 200 m backstroke that stood for 23 years. At the 1972 Summer Olympics she was the flag bearer for Singapore and competed in the 100 m and 200 m backstroke events, but failed to reach the finals. Chan was named the Best Sportswoman of Singapore for five consecutive years (1967–1971). In 2002, she was inducted into the Singapore Sports Council Hall of Fame and ranked fourth among Singapore's 50 greatest athletes.

Chan retired from competitions in 1973, aged 19, to become the first Singaporean female professional coach. She later turned to journalism, and currently runs her own media company, Visus Inq.

== Family ==
Patricia and her siblings were coached by their father, Chan Ah Kow, the Singaporean Coach of the Year in 1970 and 1971. Her brother Roy Chan Kum Wah, won a bronze medal at the 1970 Asian Games in the 4×200 m relay. Her two other brothers, Alex Chan Meng Wah and Bernard Chan Cheng Wah, were swimmers too; the latter competed at the 1966 Asian Games and 1964 Summer Olympics. Her other brother Mark Chan is a composer, while her elder sister, Victoria Chan-Palay, is a prominent neuroscientist in the United States and Switzerland. Her niece, Marina, is an international swimmer.
