= Tan Eng Yoon =

Singaporean sprinter

Personal information
- Nationality: Singaporean
- Born: 9 January 1928
- Died: 30 January 2010 (aged 82) Singapore

Sport
- Sport: Athletics
- Event: Sprinting
- Club: Swift Athletes

Tan Eng Yoon (9 January 1928 – 30 January 2010) was a Singaporean sprinter who competed at the 1956 Summer Olympics.

== Biography ==
Tan Eng Yoon finished second behind Ken Wilmshurst in the triple jump event at the British 1956 AAA Championships.

Later that year he represented Malaysia at the 1956 Olympic Games in Melbourne, where he competed in the men's 100 metres.

In the triple jump event at the 1959 Southeast Asian Peninsular Games, he set a Singaporean record that lasted for 32 years. He later became the coach of the national team, and was the first President of the Singapore Olympians Association.

Tan died on 30 January 2010 after being hit by a motorist.
