= Mark Chan =

Mark Chan 陈国华
- Born: 1958 (age 67–68)
- Origin: Singapore
- Occupations: composer, recording artist, singer, instrumentalist, poet and painter

Mark Chan (born 1958) is a Singaporean composer, recording artist, singer, instrumentalist, poet, and painter. He studied fine arts at the Edinburgh College of Art and is recognised as a renowned Singaporean composer.

Chan trained for 9 years in classical Chinese flutes (dizi and xiao), for 7 years as a classical countertenor and for various years with other instruments including the cello, erhu, pipa, guanzi, piano and percussion. He also plays Japanese and Indonesian flutes. Chan is known for his style, which he describes as a "blend of Eastern and Western sounds, fusing a range of Chinese, Indonesian, Malay and Indian elements with a modern international sensibility." On Singapore television, he was the host of Common Threads and Retro Trek.

== Personal life ==
Chan completed his primary and secondary education in Anglo-Chinese School, where he was a nationally ranked swimmer. His father Chan Ah Kow was the Singapore National Olympic Council's Coach of the Year in 1970–72. Mark and his siblings Alex, Bernard, Roy and Patricia were trained by their father and swam competitively. Another sister Victoria Chan-Palay became a neuroscientist in the United States and Switzerland.

As an openly gay artist, Chan said his sexuality was never an issue in the Singapore industry. He once advised young gay artists to, "first and foremost, be an artist. A good one. And only after that, a gay one. It's not a side issue but the art thing is so big it requires the whole of you." As an artist, Chan has a reputation for being exacting.

Chan describes himself as a Zen-Buddhist and Taoist.

== Music ==
Chan has seven solo albums to his name under Warner (WEA), Polygram, BMG and Japan's Hori Productions. In addition, he has written and produced for pop stars Andy Lau and Tracy Huang, and has composed for arts festivals, theatre and TV.

Chan represented Singapore in the Voice of Asia 1990 in Kazakhstan. In 2006, his music was featured in Cannes, France, at the 40th edition of Midem.

1985 – Face to Face

1991 – China Blue

1994 – The Other Actor

1996 – Nature Boy

1997 – Traveling Under the Light of the Full Moon

2002 – Beneath the Skin of Things

2002 – Reflections on War, Reflections on Peace was commissioned by the Singapore Heritage Board for the permanent war museum at Bukit Chandu to comment on present day reality and the fragility of peace, while also looking back on the horrors and bravery of the Second World War, with specific reference to Singapore. This work is in the National Archives of Singapore.

== Theatre Composer ==
Chan was Resident Composer of TheatreWorks for 10 years (1989–1999). He composed, directed and recorded music for over 30 plays in Singapore, China, Japan, Indonesia, Malaysia, Canada, Australia and Hong Kong. The plays he scored have been in English, Chinese, Malay and Japanese. Many of these plays have toured internationally: Madame Mao’s Memories (Edinburgh Festival), Lear (Japan, Hong Kong, Singapore, Indonesia, Australia, Germany, Denmark) and Three Children (Japan, Singapore, Malaysia). In 1992, Three Children was rated 15th among all theatre productions in Japan that year. His other theatre credits include Ozone, the David Henry Hwang Festival, Michael Chiang's 1994 play, Private Parts, and the English translation of Kuo Pao Kun's Lao Jiu.

In 1999, Chan wrote the music and lyrics for Haunted, which played at Singapore's Victoria Theatre. In 2010, he adapted Haunted into a chamber style musical with the new title, The Rain Came Down Like Pearls The Night I Died. The production was part of the National University of Singapore Arts Festival 2010, featuring Chan as narrator.

In 2000, Chan took a self-imposed break away from music for the theatre to concentrate on "music for music." In 2012, with Julian Wong and lyricist Xiaohan, he composed the score to Kuo's Day I Met The Prince, based on The Little Prince. This Mandarin production, directed by Kuo's daughter, Kuo Jian Hong, was part of the Kuo Pao Kun Festival 2012 to commemorate his 10th death anniversary.

== Arts Festivals ==
During his break from the theatre, Chan embarked on a series of commissions from the Singapore Arts Festival:

2003 – Little Toys: jointly commissioned by the Singapore and Hong Kong Arts Festivals 2003, Little Toys premiered in Hong Kong in February 2003 and won widespread critical acclaim in Singapore, Shanghai, Paris and Copenhagen. Chan scored the Chinese film of the same title for erhu, pipa, cello, piano, percussion, guanzi, and assorted keyboards.

2003 – Email & Eternity: commissioned by the Singapore Chinese Orchestra, this piece used the analogy of modern air-travel to reveal the hidden spirituality of modern life.

2004 – Opiume: jointly commissioned by the HK New Vision Arts Festival and Singapore Arts Festival 2004, the chamber opera starred Australian singers, Judith Dodsworth, Xie Kun, and Paul Hughes. Chan wrote the 100-minute-long Opiume in five months, dividing the opera into 6 movements, which reflect several chapters of the Opium War story: Discovery, Intoxication, Economics, Addiction, Conflict and Epiphany.

2007 – Dreaming of Kuanyin Meets Madonna: jointly commissioned by the Singapore Arts Festival 2007 and contemporary dance ensemble, Arts Fission. The production was about 2 deities that represented "inclusive spirituality" to Chan – Kuanyin and the Virgin Mary, as well pop singer Madonna.

2012 – Flight of the Jade Bird: Chan's latest work was commissioned by the Singapore Arts Festival 2012 for its opening. It premiered at the Esplanade Concert Hall in May 2012. Described by Chan as an operatic tone poem, The Flight of the Jade Bird also featured Mui Cheuk-Yin as solo dancer and choreographer. The story was inspired by the mythology that envelops ancient pieces of jade in many cultures, tapping into jade's spiritual quality, historical value and its special relationship with the bearer. In November 2012, The Flight of the Jade Bird played at the Hong Kong New Vision Arts Festival. This production used Meyer Sound's Constellation system to create four basic acoustical characteristics to frame the work, a process that was documented in Pro Audio Asia magazine.
