= Mohamed bin Abdul Rahman =

Malaysian sprinter

Personal information
- Nationality: Malaysian
- Born: 1935 (age 90–91)

Sport
- Sport: Sprinting
- Event: 4 × 400 metres relay

Mohamed bin Abdul Rahman (born 1935) is a Malaysian sprinter. He competed in the men's 4 × 400 metres relay at the 1964 Summer Olympics.
