= Victoria Chan-Palay =

Neuroscientist

Victoria Lye-Hua Chan-Palay (born 9 October 1945) is a Singaporean-born Swiss neuroscientist who has worked previously in the United States and Switzerland.

== Early life and education ==
Chan is the second daughter of noted Singaporean swimming coach Dr. Chan Ah Kow. Among her four brothers and two sisters is Patricia Chan, who represented Singapore in swimming at the Southeast Asian Games in the 1960s and 1970s. As a young woman, Chan excelled at school in science, and herself represented Singapore in international swimming competitions as well. (Note: Esquire and Smith College state that she represented Singapore at the 1960 Summer Olympics in swimming. However, she does not appear in lists of competitors.)

She left Singapore in 1962 with a scholarship to Smith College, from which she graduated in 1965. She then went on to the Tufts University School of Medicine for a Ph.D., which she completed in 1969. While living in the Greater Boston area, she met Sanford Palay, and married him in 1970. She graduated from Harvard Medical School in 1975 as the first woman to receive an M.D. summa cum laude.

Chan-Palay had two daughters Vicky and Rebecca, the latter with her husband Sanford Palay. However, their marriage ended in divorce.

== Scientific career ==
Chan-Palay did seminal research in neuroscience with her husband in the 1970s. She would go on to found the journal Dementia and Geriatric Cognitive Disorders. She was named a White House Fellow and an assistant to Secretary of Defense Harold Brown in 1979, making her one of the first Singaporeans to achieve such a high rank in the United States government.

She later moved to Switzerland, where she served as part of the faculty of University of Zurich Medical School from 1989. She was awarded the Humboldt Prize in Medical Research by the Alexander von Humboldt Foundation. She relinquished her United States citizenship in 2012.

== Works ==
- Chan-Curtis, Victoria Lye-Hua (October 1969). "Cytochemical localization of the nucleic acids by an acriflavine-phosphotungstate complex for fluorescence microscopy and electron microscopy". The Journal of Histochemistry and Cytochemistry. Ph.D. Dissertation. 18 (9). Tufts University: 609–27. doi:10.1177/18.9.609. OCLC 11410563. PMID 4097868. S2CID 41118433.
- Palay, Sanford L.; Chan-Palay, Victoria (1974). Cerebellar cortex: cytology and organization. Springer. ISBN 9783642655814. OCLC 1367086.
- Chan-Palay, Victoria (1977). Cerebellar dentate nucleus: organization, cytology and transmitters. Springer-Verlag. OCLC 2542632.
- Chan-Palay, Victoria; Palay, Sanford L. (1982). Cytochemical methods in neuroanatomy. A. R. Liss. ISBN 9780845127001. OCLC 8451650.
- C Köhler, L G Eriksson, S Davies, Chan-Palay (1987) "Co-localization of neuropeptide tyrosine and somatostatin immunoreactivity in neurons of individual subfields of the rat hippocampal region" National Center for Biotechnology Information. doi: 10.1016/0304-3940(87)90551-9 PMID: 2886960
