= 1969 SEAP Games =

Multi-sport event in Rangoon, Burma

5th Southeast Asian Peninsular Games
- Host city: Rangoon, Burma
- Nations: 6
- Sport: 15
- Opening: 6 December 1969
- Closing: 13 December 1969
- Opened by: Ne Win; Prime Minister of Burma
- Athlete's Oath: Khin Maung Myint (shooting)
- Torch lighter: Maung Maung (football)
- Ceremony venue: Bogyoke Aung San Stadium

The 1969 Southeast Asian Peninsular Games, officially known as the 5th Southeast Asian Peninsular Games, were a Southeast Asian multi-sport event held in Rangoon, Burma from 6 to 13 December 1969 with 15 sports featured in the games. Republic of Vietnam (South Vietnam) had reluctantly declined to host this edition because the attack of the North Vietnam (Tet Offensive) in 1968 (Vietnam War). Singapore, the youngest member of the SEAP Games Federation at the time, suggested in this edition of the games to change the name of the sports festival to the Southeast Asia Games. Although it was not officially stated, the inclusion of the Philippines and Indonesia in the expanded federation was to greatly help alleviate the hosting problems, as well as to set higher and more competitive standards in the games. After hosting the 5th edition, Burma declined hosting succeeding games due to lack of financial capability. This was Burma's second time to host the games and its first time since 1961. The games was opened and closed by Ne Win, the Prime Minister and Chairman of Union Revolutionary Council of Burma at the Bogyoke Aung San Stadium. The final medal tally was led by host Burma, followed by Thailand and Singapore.

== The games ==
=== Participating nations ===
- Burma (host)
- Laos
- Malaysia
- Singapore
- South Vietnam
- Thailand

=== Sports ===
- Aquatics
- Athletics
- Badminton
- Basketball
- Boxing
- Cycling
- Football
- Gymnastics
- Judo
- Shooting
- Sailing
- Table tennis
- Tennis
- Volleyball
- Weightlifting

=== Medal table ===
* Host nation (Burma)

Rank	Nation	Gold	Silver	Bronze	Total
1	Burma (BIR)*	57	46	46	149
2	Thailand (THA)	32	32	45	109
3	Singapore (SIN)	31	39	23	93
4	Malaysia (MAS)	16	24	39	79
5	South Vietnam (VNM)	9	5	8	22
6	Laos (LAO)	0	0	3	3
Totals (6 entries)		145	146	164	455

Preceded by Bangkok	Southeast Asian Peninsular Games; Rangoon; V Southeast Asian Peninsular Games (1969)	Succeeded by Kuala Lumpur
