= 1967 SEAP Games =

Multi-sport event in Bangkok, Thailand

4th Southeast Asian Peninsular Games
- Host city: Bangkok, Thailand
- Nations: 6
- Sport: 16
- Opening: 9 December 1967
- Closing: 16 December 1967
- Opened by: Bhumibol Adulyadej; King of Thailand
- Torch lighter: Suthi Manyakass
- Ceremony venue: National Stadium

The 1967 Southeast Asian Peninsular Games, officially known as the 4th Southeast Asian Peninsular Games, were a Southeast Asian multi-sport event held in Bangkok, Thailand from 9 to 16 December 1967 with 16 sports featured in the games. Cambodia once again declined to host this edition of the games, as it did in 1963. This was Thailand's second time hosting the Southeast Asian Games, and its first time since the 1959 inaugural games. The games was opened and closed by Bhumibol Adulyadej, the King of Thailand at the Suphachalasai Stadium. The final medal tally was led by host Thailand, followed by Singapore and Malaysia.

== The games ==
=== Participating nations ===
- Burma
- Laos
- Malaysia
- Singapore
- South Vietnam
- Thailand (host)

=== Sports ===
- Aquatics
- Athletics
- Badminton
- Basketball
- Boxing
- Cycling
- Football
- Judo
- Rugby union
- Shooting
- Sepak takraw
- Sailing
- Table tennis
- Tennis
- Volleyball
- Weightlifting

=== Medal table ===
Key

* Host nation (Thailand)

Rank	Nation	Gold	Silver	Bronze	Total
1	Thailand (THA)*	77	48	47	172
2	Singapore (SIN)	28	31	28	87
3	Malaysia (MAS)	23	29	43	95
4	Burma (BIR)	11	26	32	69
5	Vietnam (VIE)	6	10	17	33
6	Laos (LAO)	0	0	3	3
Totals (6 entries)		145	144	170	459

Preceded by Kuala Lumpur	Southeast Asian Peninsular Games; Bangkok; IV Southeast Asian Peninsular Games (1967)	Succeeded by Rangoon
