= 1961 SEAP Games =

Multi-sport event in Rangoon, Burma

2nd Southeast Asian Peninsular Games
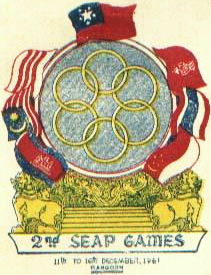
- Host city: Rangoon, Burma
- Nations: 7
- Sport: 13
- Opening: 11 December 1961
- Closing: 16 December 1961
- Opened by: Win Maung; President of Burma
- Torch lighter: Zaw Weik
- Ceremony venue: Bogyoke Aung San Stadium

The 1961 Southeast Asian Peninsular Games, officially known as the 2nd Southeast Asian Peninsular Games, were a Southeast Asian multi-sport event held in Rangoon, Burma from 11 to 16 December 1961 with 13 sports featured in the games. This was the first time all six founding members of the SEAP Games Federation competed in the biennial sports festival and the first time Myanmar, then known as Burma hosted the games. Burma, later known as Myanmar is the second country to host the Southeast Asian Peninsular Games, which later known as the Southeast Asian Games after Thailand. The games was opened and closed by Win Maung, the President of Burma at the Bogyoke Aung San Stadium. The final medal tally was led by host Burma, followed by Thailand and Malaya.

== The games ==
=== Participating nations ===
- Burma (host)
- Cambodia
- Laos
- Malaya
- Singapore
- Thailand
- South Vietnam

^{1} - Singapore was a self-governing British colony at that time.

=== Sports ===
- Aquatics
- Athletics
- Badminton
- Basketball
- Boxing
- Cycling
- Football
- Shooting
- Sailing
- Table tennis
- Tennis
- Volleyball
- Weightlifting

=== Medal table ===
Key

* Host nation (Burma)

Rank	Nation	Gold	Silver	Bronze	Total
1	Burma (BIR)*	35	26	43	104
2	Thailand (THA)	21	18	22	61
3	Malaya (MAL)	16	24	39	79
4	South Vietnam (VNM)	9	5	8	22
5	Singapore (SIN)	4	13	11	28
6	Cambodia (CAM)	1	6	4	11
7	Laos (LAO)	0	0	8	8
Totals (7 entries)		86	92	135	313

Preceded by Bangkok	Southeast Asian Peninsular Games; Rangoon; II Southeast Asian Peninsular Games (1961)	Succeeded by Kuala Lumpur
