= 1959 SEAP Games =

Multi-sport event in Bangkok, Thailand

1st Southeast Asian Peninsular Games
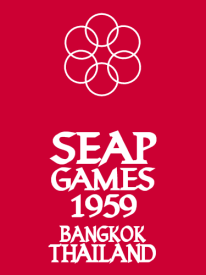
- Host city: Bangkok, Thailand
- Nations: 6
- Sport: 12
- Opening: 12 December 1959
- Closing: 17 December 1959
- Opened by: Bhumibol Adulyadej; King of Thailand
- Torch lighter: Representatives from 6 participating countries Abdul Ghani (Malaya); Tan Eng Yoon (Singapore)
- Ceremony venue: National Stadium

The 1959 Southeast Asian Peninsular Games, officially known as the 1st Southeast Asian Peninsular Games, were the first and inaugural edition of the biennial multi-sport event for Southeast Asian athletes, organised by the SEAP Games Federation. It was held in Bangkok, Thailand from 12 to 17 December 1959 with 12 sports featured in the games. Cambodia, one of the six founding members of the SEAP Games Federation, did not compete at the inaugural edition. For the first time and first among all Southeast Asian nations, Thailand hosted the Southeast Asian Peninsular Games, which later known as the Southeast Asian Games. The games was opened and closed by Bhumibol Adulyadej, the King of Thailand at the Suphachalasai Stadium. The final medal tally was led by host Thailand, followed by its neighbouring countries, Burma and Malaya.

== The games ==
=== Participating nations ===
Singapore was a self-governing British colony at that time. For more information, see here.

- Burma
- Laos
- Malaya
- Singapore
- Thailand (host)
- South Vietnam

=== Sports ===
- Swimming
- Athletics
- Badminton
- Basketball
- Boxing
- Cycling
- Football
- Shooting
- Table tennis
- Tennis
- Volleyball
- Weightlifting

== Medal summary ==
* Host nation (Thailand)

1959 Southeast Asian Peninsular Games
Rank	Nation	Gold	Silver	Bronze	Total
1	Thailand (THA)*	35	26	15	76
2	Burma (BIR)	11	15	14	40
3	Malaya (MAS)	8	15	11	34
4	Singapore (SIN)	8	7	18	33
5	South Vietnam (VNM)	5	5	6	16
6	Laos (LAO)	0	0	2	2
Totals (6 entries)		67	68	66	201

Preceded by Inaugural Games	Southeast Asian Peninsular Games; Bangkok; I Southeast Asian Peninsular Games (1959)	Succeeded by Rangoon
