= Philippines at the 1981 SEA Games =

Philippines at the 1981 Southeast Asian Games
- IOC code: PHI
- NOC: Philippine Olympic Committee
- Website: www.olympic.ph (in English)

in Manila
- Medals Ranked 3rd: Gold 55 Silver 55 Bronze 77 Total 187

Southeast Asian Games appearances (overview)
- 1977; 1979; 1981; 1983; 1985; 1987; 1989; 1991; 1993; 1995; 1997; 1999; 2001; 2003; 2005; 2007; 2009; 2011; 2013; 2015; 2017; 2019; 2021; 2023; 2025; 2027; 2029

The Philippines hosted the 11th Southeast Asian Games for the first time and held from 6 to 15 December 1981 in the city of Manila.

== SEA Games performance ==
The Philippine contingent, from the 24 golds which they won in the 1979 games in Jakarta, came through this time with 55 golds and a third place overall finish. Gintong Alay Project Director and Philippine Olympic Committee chairman Michael Keon was jubilant over the Philippines' impressive show of strength but told the delegations gathered during the closing rites that it was never the design of the host country to dominate the 11th SEA games.

The Philippines came through with a bumper harvest of golds in cycling, winning eight of the golds disputed. The host country also grabbed eight golds in athletics -track and field and bowling. Boxing and weightlifting had six golds each. Swimming produced four gold medals, with three credited to Billy Wilson, who came home from his studies and training in the US, and one to veteran Jairulla Jaitulla.

Lydia de Vega and Isidro del Prado were the country's two double gold medal winners and were cited with more honors. De Vega was cited as best female track performer for her record-breaking performances in the 200 meters and del Prado as the best male track performer for a record-breaking performances in the 400 meters.

It was World Champion Bong Coo of bowling, who emerged as the Philippines' most bemedalled campaigner winning four gold medals and two silver medals in six events disputed. The Filipinos were blanked in three events; archery, badminton and table tennis.

== Medalists ==
=== Gold ===
No.	Medal	Name	Sport	Event
1	Gold	Philippines	Basketball	Men's team
2	Gold	William Wilson	Swimming	Men's 200m freestyle
3	Gold	William Wilson	Swimming	Men's 400m freestyle
4	Gold	William Wilson	Swimming	Men's 1500m freestyle
5	Gold	Jairulla Jaitulla	Swimming	Men's 100m breaststroke
6	Gold	Alexander Marcial; Rudolf Gabriel	Tennis	Men's doubles
7	Gold	Pia Tamayo	Tennis	Women's singles
8	Gold	Pia Tamayo; Alexander Marcial	Tennis	Mixed doubles
9	Gold	Philippines	Volleyball	Women's team
10	Gold	Ramon Solis	Weightlifting	Men's Weightlifting

=== Silver ===
No.	Medal	Name	Sport	Event
1	Silver	Carlos Santos Jr.	Archery	Men's individual 30m recurve
2	Silver	Carlos Santos Jr.	Archery	Men's individual 50m recurve
3	Silver	Carla Ramos	Archery	Women's individual 30m recurve
4	Silver	Philippines	Basketball	Women's team
5	Silver	Richard Luna	Swimming	Men's 100m backstroke
6	Silver	Francisco Guanco	Swimming	Men's 200m breaststroke
7	Silver	Renato Padronia	Swimming	Men's 100m butterfly
8	Silver	William Wilson	Swimming	Men's 200m butterfly
9	Silver	Jairulla Jaitulla	Swimming	Men's 200m individual medley
10	Silver	Philippines	Swimming	Men's team 4 × 200 m freestyle relay
11	Silver	Philippines	Swimming	Men's team 4 × 100 m Medley Relay
12	Silver	Dyan Castillejo; Gladys Imperial; Marissa Sanchez; Pia Tamayo	Tennis	Women's team

=== Bronze ===
No.	Medal	Name	Sport	Event
1	Bronze	Carlos Santos Jr.	Archery	Men's individual 90m recurve
2	Bronze	Philippines	Archery	Men's recurve team
3	Bronze	Cherrie Valera	Archery	Women's individual recurve
4	Bronze	Cherrie Valera	Archery	Women's individual 70m recurve
5	Bronze	Philippines	Archery	Women's recurve team
6	Bronze	Vicente Cheng	Swimming	Men's 400m freestyle
7	Bronze	Richard Luna	Swimming	Men's 200m backstroke
8	Bronze	Francisco Guanco	Swimming	Men's 100m breaststroke
9	Bronze	Jairulla Jaitulla	Swimming	Men's 200m breaststroke
10	Bronze	William Wilson	Swimming	Men's 400m individual medley
11	Bronze	Philippines	Swimming	Men's team 4 × 100 m freestyle relay
12	Bronze	Christine Jacob	Swimming	Women's 100m freestyle
13	Bronze	Ma. Lourdes Samson	Swimming	Women's 200m breaststroke
14	Bronze	Philippines	Swimming	Women's team 4 × 100 m freestyle relay
15	Bronze	Philippines	Swimming	Women's team 4 × 100 m Medley Relay
16	Bronze	Manuel Valleramos	Tennis	Men's singles
17	Bronze	Manuel Valleramos; Romeo Rafon	Tennis	Men's doubles
18	Bronze	Manuel Valleramos; Romeo Rafon; Alexander Marcial; Rudolf Gabriel	Tennis	Men's team
19	Bronze	Philippines	Volleyball	Men's team

=== Multiple ===
Name	Sport	1st place, gold medalist(s)	2nd place, silver medalist(s)	3rd place, bronze medalist(s)	Total
William Wilson	Swimming	3	1	1	5
Pia Tamayo	Tennis	2	1	0	3
Alexander Marcial	Tennis	2	0	1	3
Jairulla Jaitulla	Swimming	1	1	1	3
Rudolf Gabriel	Tennis	1	0	1	2
Carlos Santos Jr.	Archery	0	2	1	3
Francisco Guanco	Swimming	0	1	1	2
Richard Luna	Swimming	0	1	1	2
Manuel Valleramos	Tennis	0	0	3	3
Cherrie Valera	Archery	0	0	2	2
Romeo Rafon	Tennis	0	0	2	2

== Medal summary ==
=== By sports ===
Sport	Gold	Silver	Bronze	Total
Athletics	8	9	12	29
Bowling	8	6	4	18
Cycling	8	4	0	12
Weightlifting	6	2	13	21
Boxing	6	1	3	10
Swimming	4	7	10	21
Shooting	3	13	10	26
Gymnastics	3	3	0	6
Lawn tennis	3	1	3	7
Judo	2	4	4	10
Softball	2	0	0	2
Basketball	1	1	0	2
Volleyball	1	0	1	2
Archery	0	4	5	9
Badminton	0	0	1	1
Totals (15 entries)	55	55	66	176
