= Philippines at the 1984 Summer Olympics =

- Flag of the Philippines
- IOC code: PHI
- NOC: Philippine Olympic Committee

in Los Angeles
- Competitors: 19 (15 men, 4 women) in 6 sports
- Flag bearer: Isidro del Prado
- Medals: Gold 0 Silver 0 Bronze 0 Total 0

Summer Olympics appearances (overview)
- 1924; 1928; 1932; 1936; 1948; 1952; 1956; 1960; 1964; 1968; 1972; 1976; 1980; 1984; 1988; 1992; 1996; 2000; 2004; 2008; 2012; 2016; 2020; 2024

The Philippines competed at the 1984 Summer Olympics in Los Angeles, United States. The nation returned to the Summer Games after participating in the American-led boycott of the 1980 Summer Olympics. 19 competitors, 15 men and 4 women, took part in 28 events in 6 sports.

== Athletics ==
Men's 400 metres

- Isidro del Prado

- Heat — 46.82
- Quarterfinals — 46.71 (→ did not advance)

Men's Marathon

- Leonardo Illut

- Final — 2:49:39 (→ 77th place)

Men's 3.000m Steeplechase

- Hector Begeo

Women's 100 metres

- Lydia de Vega

Women's 200 metres

- Lydia de Vega

Women's 400m Hurdles

- Agripina de la Cruz

- Heat — 1:02.70 (→ did not advance)

Women's Long Jump

- Elma Muros

- Qualification — 5.64 m (→ did not advance, 20th place)

== Boxing ==
Men's Light Flyweight

- Nelson Jamili (Note: also competed at the 1983 SEA Games (gold medal) and the 1985 SEA Games (bronze medal))

Men's Flyweight

- Efren Tabanas

Men's Lightweight

- Leopoldo Cantancio

== Cycling ==
Seven cyclists represented the Philippines in 1984.

Sprint

- Rodolfo Guaves
- Deogracias Asuncion

1000m time trial

- Rodolfo Guaves

Individual pursuit

- Diomedes Panton

Points race

- Edgardo Pagarigan
- Deogracias Asuncion

== Sailing ==
Men's Windglider

- Policarpio Ortega

== Shooting ==
Men's Small bore rifle, prone position

- José Medina

== Swimming ==
Men's 100m Freestyle

- William Wilson

- Heat — 54.63 (→ did not advance, 45th place)

Men's 200m Freestyle

- William Wilson

- Heat — 1:57.18 (→ did not advance, 39th place)

Men's 400m Freestyle

- William Wilson

- Heat — 4:06.86 (→ did not advance, 28th place)

Men's 1500m Freestyle

- William Wilson

- Heat — 16:24.81 (→ did not advance, 24th place)

Men's 100m Breaststroke

- Francisco Guanco

- Heat — 1:07.55 (→ did not advance, 32nd place)

- Jairulla Jaitulla

- Heat — 1:08.00 (→ did not advance, 36th place)

Men's 200m Breaststroke

- Francisco Guanco

- Heat — 2:26.12 (→ did not advance, 25th place)

- Jairulla Jaitulla

- Heat — 2:30.87 (→ did not advance, 35th place)

Men's 200m Individual Medley

- Jairulla Jaitulla

- Heat — 2:12.82 (→ did not advance, 28th place)

Men's 400m Individual Medley

- Jairulla Jaitulla

- Heat — 4:51.24 (→ did not advance, 18th place)

Women's 100m Freestyle

- Christine Jacob

- Heat — 1:02.43 (→ did not advance, 36th place)

Women's 200m Freestyle

- Christine Jacob

- Heat — 2:09.79 (→ did not advance, 25th place)

Women's 100m Backstroke

- Christine Jacob

- Heat — 1:10.28 (→ did not advance, 28th place)

Women's 200m Backstroke

- Christine Jacob

- Heat — 2:32.91 (→ did not advance, 27th place)

== Tennis ==
Men's Singles Competition

- Manuel Tolentino
