= Aquatics at the 1977 SEA Games =

Aquatics at the 1977 Southeast Asian Games included swimming, diving and water polo events. The three sports of aquatics were held in Kuala Lumpur, Malaysia. Aquatics events was held between 20 November to 24 November.

== Medal winners ==
=== Swimming ===
Men's events

Event	Gold		Silver		Bronze	
100 m freestyle	(Indonesia) Kristiono Sumono	55.4 (GR)	(Indonesia) Gerald Item		(Singapore) Marc Tay	56.83
200 m freestyle	(Indonesia) Kristiono Sumono	1:58.84 (GR)	(Indonesia) Gerald Item		(Philippines) Jairulla Jaitulla	
400 m freestyle	(Indonesia) Kristiono Sumono	4:14.98	(Philippines) Mark Joseph		(Philippines) Vicente Cheng	
1500 m freestyle	(Indonesia) Kristiono Sumono	16:48.57	(Philippines) Mark Joseph		(Singapore) Khoo Teng Cheong	17:22.76
100 m backstroke	(Indonesia) Lukman Niode	1:02.87	Shared gold		(Malaysia) Lim Yit Aun	
100 m backstroke	(Singapore) Mark Chan	1:02.87	Shared gold		(Malaysia) Lim Yit Aun	
200 m backstroke	(Indonesia) Lukman Niode	2:17.3	(Malaysia) Chiang Jin Choon		(Malaysia) Lim Yit Aun	
100 m breaststroke	(Philippines) Jairulla Jaitulla	1:09.07 (GR)	(Indonesia) Kun Hantio Prastiasto	1:09.28	(Philippines) Kemalpasa Umih	
200 m breaststroke	(Indonesia) Kun Hantio Prastiasto	2:30.08	(Philippines) Jairulla Jaitulla		(Philippines) Kemalpasa Umih	
100 m butterfly	(Indonesia) Gerald Item	1:00.71	(Thailand) Viret Onkprasert		(Singapore) Richard Quek	1:02.35
200 m butterfly	(Indonesia) Gerald Item	2:09.30 (GR)	(Singapore) Richard Quek	2:15.45	(Singapore) Danny Ee	2:15.70
400 m individual medley	(Indonesia) Gerald Item	4:51.26	(Indonesia) John Item		(Philippines) Jairulla Jaitulla	
4 × 100 m freestyle relay	Indonesia	3:46.84	Singapore		Philippines	
4 × 200 m freestyle relay	Indonesia Dwijayanto; John Item; Gerald Item; Kristiono Sumono	8:15.6	Philippines Vicente Cheng; Edgar Borja; Jairulla Jaitulla; Mark Joseph	8:23.48	Singapore Ng Meng Seng; Marc Tay; Oon Jin Teik; Khoo Teng Cheong	8:42.23
4 × 100 m medley relay	Indonesia	4:06.83	Singapore	4:14.75	Malaysia	

Women's events

Event	Gold		Silver		Bronze	
100 m freestyle	(Thailand) Rachaniwan Bulakul	1:01.61	(Philippines) Nancy Deano		(Thailand) Sumacanan	
200 m freestyle	(Singapore) Junie Sng	2:10.82	(Thailand) Rachaniwan Bulakul		(Malaysia) Christina Lam Yong Leng	
400 m freestyle	(Singapore) Junie Sng	4:30.75 (GR)	(Thailand) Rachaniwan Bulakul		(Malaysia) Christina Lam Yong Leng	
800 m freestyle	(Singapore) Junie Sng	9:14.63	(Thailand) Rachaniwan Bulakul	9:35.63	(Malaysia) Christina Lam Yong Leng	9:40.38
100 m backstroke	(Indonesia) Nanik Juliati	1:11.92 (GR)	(Malaysia) Lim Yit Sin		(Indonesia) Tati Irianti Erningpraja	
200 m backstroke	(Indonesia) Nanik Juliati		(Philippines) Nancy Deano		(Malaysia) Lim Yit Sin	
100 m breaststroke	(Indonesia) Anita Suparjiman	1:18.92	(Indonesia) Nanik Juliati		(Singapore) Desiree Lim	1:20.10
200 m breaststroke	(Indonesia) Anita Suparjiman	2:51.57 (GR)	(Indonesia) Nanik Juliati		(Singapore) Desiree Lim	2:53.14
100 m butterfly	(Singapore) Junie Sng	1:08.92	(Malaysia) Christina Lam Yong Leng		(Thailand) Rachaniwan Bulakul	
200 m butterfly	(Singapore) Junie Sng	2:27.87 (GR)	(Malaysia) Christina Lam Yong Leng	2:30.92	(Indonesia) Nunung Selowati	2:31.13
200 m individual medley	(Indonesia) Nanik Juliati	2:32.69	(Singapore) Junie Sng	2:33.99	(Indonesia) Maulinawati Suharyono	
4 × 100 m freestyle relay	Thailand	4:17.79	Indonesia	4:21.79	Philippines	4:23.27
4 × 100 m medley relay	Indonesia	4:45.14	Malaysia		Singapore	

=== Diving ===
Men's events

Event	Gold		Silver	Bronze
Highboard	(Thailand) Sungwal Foangdee	426.66 pts	(Malaysia) Chan Chee Keong	(Indonesia) Frank Jediman
Platform	(Thailand) Somchai Ongkasingha	390.30 pts	(Thailand) Somkid Ongkasingha	(Malaysia) Teo Cheng Kiat

Women's events

Event	Gold		Silver	Bronze
Highboard	(Indonesia) Harly Ramayani	281.31 pts	(Indonesia) Sianti Ningsih	
Platform	(Indonesia) Harly Ramayani		(Indonesia) Sianti Ningsih	
Springboard	(Indonesia) Myrna Harjolukita	402.06 pts	(Indonesia) Sianti Ningsih	(Malaysia) Linda Williams

=== Water polo ===
Event	Gold	Silver	Bronze
Men's	Singapore	Malaysia	Indonesia

== Medal table ==
Rank	Nation	Gold	Silver	Bronze	Total
1	Indonesia	22	10	5	37
2	Singapore	7	4	8	19
3	Thailand	4	5	2	11
4	Philippines	1	6	7	14
5	Malaysia	0	7	9	16
Totals (5 entries)		34	32	31	97
