= Indonesia at the 1978 Asian Games =

- IOC code: INA
- NOC: Indonesian Olympic Committee
- Website: www.nocindonesia.or.id (in English)

in Bangkok
- Medals Ranked 7th: Gold 8 Silver 7 Bronze 18 Total 33

Asian Games appearances (overview)
- 1951; 1954; 1958; 1962; 1966; 1970; 1974; 1978; 1982; 1986; 1990; 1994; 1998; 2002; 2006; 2010; 2014; 2018; 2022; 2026

Indonesia participated in the 1978 Asian Games held in Bangkok, Thailand from December 9, 1978 to December 20, 1978. This country was ranked ninth with 8 gold medals, 7 silver medals and 18 bronze medals with a total of 33 medals.

== Medal summary ==
=== Medal table ===
Sport	Gold	Silver	Bronze	Total
Badminton	4	2	3	9
Tennis	3	0	2	5
Boxing	1	1	2	4
Swimming	0	3	9	12
Table tennis	0	1	0	1
Archery	0	0	1	1
Fencing	0	0	1	1
Total	8	7	18	33

=== Medalists ===
Medal	Name	Sport	Event
Gold	Ade Chandra; Christian Hadinata; Rudy Heryanto; Hariamanto Kartono; Liem Swie King; Iie Sumirat	Badminton	Men's team
Gold	Liem Swie King	Badminton	Men's singles
Gold	Ade Chandra; Christian Hadinata	Badminton	Men's doubles
Gold	Verawaty Wiharjo; Imelda Wiguna	Badminton	Women's doubles
Gold	Wiem Gommies	Boxing	Men's Middleweight (75 kg)
Gold	Hadiman; Yustedjo Tarik; Gondo Widjojo; Atet Wijono	Tennis	Men's team
Gold	Atet Wijono	Tennis	Men's singles
Gold	Yustedjo Tarik; Hadiman	Tennis	Men's doubles
Silver	Ruth Damayanti; Ivana Lie; Tjan So Gwan; Theresia Widiastuti; Imelda Wiguna; Verawaty Wiharjo	Badminton	Women's team
Silver	Hariamanto Kartono; Theresia Widiastuti	Badminton	Mixed doubles
Silver	Johny Riberu	Boxing	Men's Flyweight (51 kg)
Silver	Kristiono Sumono	Swimming	Men's 200 m freestyle
Silver	Gerald Item	Swimming	Men's 200 m butterfly
Silver	Dwi Widjayanto; John David Item; Gerald Item; Kristiono Sumono	Swimming	Men's 4×200 m freestyle relay
Silver	Empie Wuisan; Sinyo Supit	Table tennis	Men's doubles
Bronze	Adang Adjidji; Siddak Jubadjati; Donald Pandiangan	Archery	Men's team
Bronze	Iie Sumirat	Badminton	Men's singles
Bronze	Theresia Widiastuti; Ruth Damayanti	Badminton	Women's doubles
Bronze	Christian Hadinata; Imelda Wiguna	Badminton	Mixed doubles
Bronze	Benny Maniani	Boxing	Men's Light heavyweight (81 kg)
Bronze	Krismanto	Boxing	Men's Heavyweight (+81 kg)
Bronze	Rita Piri Hehanusa; Wahyu Hertati; Silvia Koeswandi; Slamet Poerawinata	Fencing	Women's Team foil
Bronze	Kristiono Sumono	Swimming	Men's 400 m freestyle
Bronze	Gerald Item	Swimming	Men's 100 m butterfly
Bronze	Gerald Item	Swimming	Men's 200 m individual medley
Bronze	Gerald Item	Swimming	Men's 400 m individual medley
Bronze	Gerald Item; Dwi Widjayanto; John David Item; Kristiono Sumono	Swimming	Men's 4×100 m freestyle relay
Bronze	Lukman Niode; Kun Hantyo; Gerald Item; Dwi Widjayanto	Swimming	Men's 4×100 m medley relay
Bronze	Nunung Selowati	Swimming	Women's 200 m butterfly
Bronze	Naniek Suwadji	Swimming	Women's 400 m individual medley
Bronze	Naniek Suwadji; Anita Sapardjiman; Tati Irianti Erningpraja; Nunung Selowati	Swimming	Women's 4×100 m medley relay
Bronze	Lita Sugiarto; Yolanda Soemarno; Ayi Sutarno; Elvis Tarik	Tennis	Women's team
Bronze	Hadiman; Ayi Sutarno	Tennis	Mixed doubles
