= Philippines at the 1979 SEA Games =

Philippines at the 1979 Southeast Asian Games
- IOC code: PHI
- NOC: Philippine Olympic Committee
- Website: www.olympic.ph (in English)

in Jakarta
- Medals Ranked 4th: Gold 24 Silver 31 Bronze 38 Total 93

Southeast Asian Games appearances (overview)
- 1977; 1979; 1981; 1983; 1985; 1987; 1989; 1991; 1993; 1995; 1997; 1999; 2001; 2003; 2005; 2007; 2009; 2011; 2013; 2015; 2017; 2019; 2021; 2023; 2025; 2027; 2029

The Philippines participated at the 10th Southeast Asian Games held from 21 to 30 September 1979 in Jakarta, Indonesia.

== Medalists ==
=== Gold ===
No.	Medal	Name	Sport	Event
1	Gold	William Wilson	Swimming	Men's 400m freestyle
2	Gold	Pia Tamayo; Gladys Imperial	Tennis	Women's doubles
3	Gold	Philippines	Volleyball	Women's team

=== Silver ===
No.	Medal	Name	Sport	Event
1	Silver	Carlos Santos Jr.	Archery	Men's individual recurve
2	Silver	Carlos Santos Jr.	Archery	Men's individual recurve 50m
3	Silver	Carlos Santos Jr.	Archery	Men's individual recurve 70m
4	Silver	Carlos Santos Jr.	Archery	Men's individual recurve 90m
5	Silver	Philippines	Archery	Men's team recurve
6	Silver	Carla Ramas	Archery	Women's individual recurve 50m
7	Silver	Philippines	Archery	Women's team recurve
8	Silver	Philippines	Basketball	Men's team
9	Silver	Richard Luna	Swimming	Men's 100m backstroke
10	Silver	Richard Luna	Swimming	Men's 200m backstroke
11	Silver	Jairulla Jaitulla	Swimming	Men's 100m breaststroke
12	Silver	Jairulla Jaitulla	Swimming	Men's 200m breaststroke
13	Silver	Philippines	Swimming	Men's 4 × 100 m Medley Relay
14	Silver	Manuel Valleramos	Tennis	Men's singles
15	Silver	Ramon Solis	Weightlifting	Men's Weightlifting

=== Bronze ===
No.	Medal	Name	Sport	Event
1	Bronze	Carlos Santos Jr.	Archery	Men's individual recurve 30m
2	Bronze	Jocelyn Guerrero	Archery	Women's individual recurve 30m
3	Bronze	Vicente Cheng	Swimming	Men's 200m freestyle
4	Bronze	William Wilson	Swimming	Men's 1500m freestyle
5	Bronze	Noel Madridejo	Swimming	Men's 200m backstroke
6	Bronze	Philippines	Swimming	Men's 4 × 100 m freestyle relay
7	Bronze	Philippines	Swimming	Men's 4 × 200 m freestyle relay
8	Bronze	Maria Theresa Espinoza	Swimming	Women's 200m backstroke
9	Bronze	Nancy Deano	Swimming	Women's 100m breaststroke
10	Bronze	Rudolf Gabriel; Manuel Castillon; Ramon Navalpa; Manuel Valleramos	Tennis	Men's team
11	Bronze	Gladys Imperial; Pia Tamayo	Tennis	Women's team
12	Bronze	Manuel Valleramos; Pia Tamayo	Tennis	Mixed doubles
13	Bronze	Philippines	Volleyball	Men's team

=== Multiple ===
Name	Sport	1st place, gold medalist(s)	2nd place, silver medalist(s)	3rd place, bronze medalist(s)	Total
Pia Tamayo	Tennis	1	0	2	3
Gladys Imperial	Tennis	1	0	1	2
William Wilson	Swimming	1	0	1	2
Carlos Santos Jr.	Archery	0	4	1	5
Richard Luna	Swimming	0	2	1	3
Jairulla Jaitulla	Swimming	0	2	0	2
Manuel Valleramos	Tennis	0	1	2	3
