= Junie Sng =

Singaporean swimmer

Personal information
- Full name: Junie Sng Poh Leng
- Nationality: Singapore
- Born: 6 June 1964 (age 62) Singapore
- Height: 1.56 m (5 ft 1 1/2 in)

Sport
- Sport: Swimming
- Strokes: Freestyle
- Club: People's Association Youth Swimming Club
Medal record
Women's swimming
Representing Singapore
Asian Games
Gold medal – first place	1978 Bangkok	400 m freestyle
Gold medal – first place	1978 Bangkok	800 m freestyle
Silver medal – second place	1978 Bangkok	200 m freestyle
SEA Games
Gold medal – first place	1975 Bangkok	800m freestyle
Gold medal – first place	1977 Kuala Lumpur	200m freestyle
Gold medal – first place	1977 Kuala Lumpur	400m freestyle
Gold medal – first place	1977 Kuala Lumpur	800m freestyle
Gold medal – first place	1977 Kuala Lumpur	100m butterfly
Gold medal – first place	1977 Kuala Lumpur	200m butterfly
Gold medal – first place	1979 Jakarta	400m freestyle
Gold medal – first place	1979 Jakarta	800m freestyle
Gold medal – first place	1979 Jakarta	100m butterfly
Gold medal – first place	1979 Jakarta	200m butterfly
Gold medal – first place	1979 Jakarta	400m individual medley
Gold medal – first place	1981 Manila	200m freestyle
Gold medal – first place	1981 Manila	400m freestyle
Gold medal – first place	1981 Manila	800m freestyle
Gold medal – first place	1981 Manila	100m butterfly
Gold medal – first place	1981 Manila	200m butterfly
Gold medal – first place	1981 Manila	200m individual medley
Gold medal – first place	1981 Manila	400m individual medley
Gold medal – first place	1983 Singapore	100m freestyle
Gold medal – first place	1983 Singapore	200m freestyle
Gold medal – first place	1983 Singapore	400m freestyle
Gold medal – first place	1983 Singapore	800m freestyle
Gold medal – first place	1983 Singapore	100m butterfly
Gold medal – first place	1983 Singapore	200m butterfly
Gold medal – first place	1983 Singapore	400m butterfly
Gold medal – first place	1983 Singapore	400m individual medley
Silver medal – second place	1975 Bangkok	400m freestyle
Silver medal – second place	1977 Kuala Lumpur	200m individual medley
Silver medal – second place	1979 Jakarta	200m freestyle
Silver medal – second place	1979 Jakarta	200m individual medley

Junie Sng Poh Leng, BBM (Chinese: 孙宝玲; pinyin: Sūn Bǎolíng; born 6 June 1964) is a Singaporean former swimmer. She was a three-time double winner of the SNOC Sportswoman of the Year and the Sportsgirl of the Year awards in 1978, 1979 and 1980. Sng was awarded the Public Service Star for her contributions to sports in 1982. She was ranked seventh in a list of Singapore's 50 Greatest Athletes of the Century by The Straits Times in 1999.

At the age of 11, Sng first represented Singapore at the 1975 Southeast Asian Peninsular Games, where she won a gold and silver medal. In March 1977, she set a national record with a time of 4:39.9 in the 400-meter freestyle. At the 1977 Southeast Asian Games in November, Sng won five gold medals and a silver as she broke six meet and two Asian Games records.

Sng became the first female swimmer to win gold for Singapore and the youngest gold medalist in a women's event in Asian Games history when she set a new Games record time of 4:31.35 in the 400-meter freestyle on 14 December 1978. A day later, she broke the Games record with a time of 9:18.33 in the 800-meter freestyle to clinch another gold medal. Sng finished the 1978 Games with two gold and one silver medal.

At the 1979 Southeast Asian Games, Sng broke three games and three national records on her way to claiming five golds, two silvers and a bronze. Sng won seven gold medals at the 1981 Games.

The 1983 Southeast Asian Games held in Singapore was Sng's final competition before she retired at her peak. She broke the nine-minute barrier, clocking an Asian record time of 8:59.46 in the 800-meter freestyle as she won a total of ten gold medals.

Sng and her family emigrated in Melbourne, Australia after she retired from swimming to focus on her university studies. She graduated with an applied science degree from the Queensland University of Technology in 1987. As of 2014, Sng is working as an IT specialist. She has two sons, Zachary and Sebastien, with her husband, Geoff Holden.
