= Aquatics at the 1979 SEA Games =

Aquatics at the 1979 Southeast Asian Games included swimming, diving and water polo events. The three sports of aquatics were held at Senayan Aquatic Sport Complex, Jakarta, Indonesia. Aquatics events was held between 24 September to 27 September.

== Medal winners ==
=== Swimming ===
Men's events

Event	Gold		Silver		Bronze	
100 m freestyle	(Indonesia) Gerald Item	55.12	(Singapore) Ang Peng Siong	55.47	(Indonesia) John Item	56.01
200 m freestyle	(Indonesia) Gerald Item	2:01.43	(Indonesia) Dwi Widjajanto	2:02.69	(Philippines) Vicente Cheng	2:03.46
400 m freestyle	(Philippines) William Wilson	4:22.53	(Indonesia) Dwi Widjajanto	4:23.23	(Singapore) Khoo Teng Cheong	4:24.71
1500 m freestyle	(Singapore) Khoo Teng Cheong	17:42.98	(Indonesia) Dwi Widjajanto	17:52.03	(Philippines) William Wilson	18:23.25
100 m backstroke	(Indonesia) Lukman Niode	1:01.09	(Philippines) Richard Luna	1:04.56	(Malaysia) Hii Toh Hock	1:05.57
200 m backstroke	(Indonesia) Lukman Niode	2:14.55	(Philippines) Richard Luna	2:18.68	(Philippines) Noel Madridejo	
100 m breaststroke	(Indonesia) Kun Hantio Prastiasto	1:08.64	(Philippines) Jairulla Jaitulla	1:09.91	(Indonesia) G Pamor Brantakesuma	1:11.71
200 m breaststroke	(Indonesia) Kun Hantio Prastiasto	2:31.05	(Philippines) Jairulla Jaitulla	2:36.17	(Indonesia) Gunawan J Junus	2:36.63
100 m butterfly	(Singapore) Richard Quek	59.78	(Indonesia) Gerald Item	59.86	(Indonesia) John Item	59.97
200 m butterfly	(Indonesia) Gerald Item	2:08.62	(Indonesia) John Item	2:11.42	(Singapore) Khoo Teng Cheong	2:12.50
200 m individual medley	(Indonesia) Gerald Item	2:16.73	(Indonesia) John Item	2:17.34	(Singapore) Lim Seng Hock	2:19.67
400 m individual medley	(Indonesia) Gerald Item	4:48.91	(Indonesia) John Item	4:50.96	(Singapore) Lim Seng Hock	5:01.03
4×100 m freestyle relay	Indonesia	3:42.52	Singapore	3:45.04	Philippines	3:57.66
4×200 m freestyle relay	Indonesia	8:11.78	Singapore	8:29.35	Philippines	8:30.35
4×100 m medley relay	Indonesia	4:07.24	Philippines	4:16.68	Malaysia	4:19.42

Women's events

Event	Gold		Silver		Bronze	
100 m freestyle	(Indonesia) Nanik Juliati	1:01.20	(Thailand) Sirirat Changkasiri	1:02.79	(Malaysia) Helen Chow	1:03.17
200 m freestyle	(Thailand) Sirirat Changkasiri	2:12.12	(Singapore) Junie Sng	2:13.63	(Indonesia) Nunung Selowati	
400 m freestyle	(Singapore) Junie Sng	4:38.29	(Thailand) Sirirat Changkasiri	4:40.77	(Indonesia) Nunung Selowati	4:42.80
800 m freestyle	(Singapore) Junie Sng	9:32.94	(Indonesia) Nunung Selowati	9:34.38	(Singapore) Tan Guat Kim	9:50.16
100 m backstroke	(Indonesia) Nanik Juliati	1:10.32	(Malaysia) Helen Chow	1:11.49	(Malaysia) Christina Lam	1:11.85
200 m backstroke	(Indonesia) Nanik Juliati	2:30.88	(Malaysia) Christina Lam	2:31.05	(Philippines) Maria Theresa Espinoza	2:36.26
100 m breaststroke	(Indonesia) Nanik Juliati	1:17.42	(Indonesia) Anita Suparjiman	1:19.15	(Philippines) Nancy Deano	1:22.04
200 m breaststroke	(Indonesia) Nanik Juliati	2:46.80	(Indonesia) Anita Suparjiman	2:53.16	(Malaysia) Andrew Phang	2:59.25
100 m butterfly	(Singapore) Junie Sng	1:07.77	(Indonesia) Nunung Selowati	1:09.51	(Singapore) Mavis Ee	1:09.71
200 m butterfly	(Singapore) Junie Sng	2:23.89	(Indonesia) Nunung Selowati	2:25.34	(Singapore) Mavis Ee	2:31.17
200 m individual medley	(Indonesia) Nanik Juliati	2:28.67	(Singapore) Junie Sng	2:34.06	(Indonesia) Anita Suparjiman	2:35.21
400 m individual medley	(Singapore) Junie Sng	5:21.06	(Indonesia) Nanik Juliati	5:26.35	(Singapore) Mavis Ee	5:29.13
4×100 m freestyle relay	Indonesia	4:17.79	(Thailand) Malaysia	4:18.91	(Singapore) Thailand	4:21.02
4×100 m medley relay	Indonesia	4:46.32	Thailand	4:53.69	Singapore	4:53.97

=== Water polo ===
Event	Gold	Silver	Bronze
Men's	Singapore	Indonesia	
