= Badminton at the 1981 SEA Games – Men's team =

Badminton – Men's team at the 1981 SEA Games
- Venue: Camp Crame Gymnasium
- Dates: 9 – 10 December 1981
- Nations: 6

Medalists
gold medal	Indonesia (INA)
silver medal	Malaysia (MAL)
bronze medal	Thailand (THA)
bronze medal	Burma (BIR)

The men's team badminton tournament at the 1981 SEA Games was held from 9 to 10 December 1981 at the Camp Crame Gymnasium in Manila, Philippines.

== Schedule ==
All times are Philippine Standard Time (UTC+08:00)

Date	Time	Event
Wednesday, 9 December	09:00	First round
Wednesday, 9 December	13:00	Semi-finals
Thursday, 10 December	19:00	Gold medal match

== Bracket ==
1st round
Burma	4
Philippines	1
Thailand	5
Brunei	0

Semi-finals
Indonesia	5
Burma	0
Thailand	2
Malaysia	3

Gold medal match
Indonesia	3
Malaysia	2

== First round ==
=== Burma vs Philippines ===
Burma
4
Camp Crame Gymnasium
9 December 1981, 09:00

Philippines
1

			1	2	3
1	(Myanmar) (Philippines)	Myint Han; Valentin Oreta	15; 2	15; 0
2	(Myanmar) (Philippines)	Maung Maung; Nelson Asuncion	15; 0	15; 0
3	(Myanmar) (Philippines)	Wai Nyunt; Daniel So				w/o
4	(Myanmar) (Philippines)	Myint Han / Wai Nyunt; Errol Chan / Daniel So	15; 9	15; 9
5	(Myanmar) (Philippines)	Maung Maung / Win Htut; Oscar Cordero / Renato Reyes	15; 1	15; 10

=== Thailand vs Brunei ===
Thailand
5
Camp Crame Gymnasium
9 December 1981, 09:00

Brunei
0

			1	2	3
1	(Thailand) (Brunei)	Sawei Chanseorasmee; Wahab Moksin	15; 5	15; 1
2	(Thailand) (Brunei)	Sarit Pisudchaikul; Marji Azmay Mohd	15; 3	15; 1
3	(Thailand) (Brunei)	Wichit Assavanapakas; Johan Abdullah	15; 4	15; 1
4	(Thailand) (Brunei)	Bandid Jaiyen / Preecha Sopajaree; Wahab Moksin / A. K. Aziz	15; 1	15; 2
5	(Thailand) (Brunei)	Sawei Chanseorasmee / Sarit Pisudchaikul; Haji Yusof / Ishak Mohammad	15; 4	15; 0

== Semi-finals ==
=== Indonesia vs Burma ===
Indonesia
5
Camp Crame Gymnasium
9 December 1981, 13:00

Burma
0

			1	2	3
1	(Indonesia) (Myanmar)	Liem Swie King; Maung Maung	15; 5	15; 2
2	(Indonesia) (Myanmar)	Hastomo Arbi; Myint Han	15; 7	15; 8
3	(Indonesia) (Myanmar)	Icuk Sugiarto; Win Htut	15; 1	15; 1
4	(Indonesia) (Myanmar)	Rudy Heryanto / Kartono; Maung Maung / Win Htut	15; 8	15; 10
5	(Indonesia) (Myanmar)	Icuk Sugiarto / Sigit Pamungkas; Myint Han / Wai Nyunt				w/o

=== Malaysia vs Thailand ===
Malaysia
3
Camp Crame Gymnasium
9 December 1981, 13:00

Thailand
2

			1	2	3
1	(Malaysia) (Thailand)	Misbun Sidek; Sarit Pisudchaikul	15; 4	15; 12
2	(Malaysia) (Thailand)	Saw Swee Leong; Sawei Chanseorasmee	10; 15	14; 17
3	(Malaysia) (Thailand)	Razif Sidek; Suwat Poonumphai	15; 11	15; 9
4	(Malaysia) (Thailand)	Jalani Sidek / Razif Sidek; Bandid Jaiyen / Preecha Sopajaree	6; 15	15; 9	15; 9
5	(Malaysia) (Thailand)	Misbun Sidek / Moo Foot Lian; Sawei Chanseorasmee / Sarit Pisudchaikul	4; 15	2; 15

== Gold medal match ==
=== Indonesia vs Malaysia ===
Indonesia
3
Camp Crame Gymnasium
10 December 1981, 19:00

Malaysia
2

			1	2	3
1	(Indonesia) (Malaysia)	Liem Swie King; Misbun Sidek	15; 3	11; 15	11; 15
2	(Indonesia) (Malaysia)	Hastomo Arbi; Saw Swee Leong	15; 6	15; 8
3	(Indonesia) (Malaysia)	Icuk Sugiarto; Razif Sidek				w/o
4	(Indonesia) (Malaysia)	Rudy Heryanto / Kartono; Jalani Sidek / Razif Sidek	15; 9	17; 16
5	(Indonesia) (Malaysia)	Sigit Pamungkas / Icuk Sugiarto; Misbun Sidek / Moo Foot Lian	15; 9	15; 1

== See also ==
- Individual event tournament
- Women's team tournament
