= Aquatics at the 1981 SEA Games =

- Location: Manila, Philippines
- Dates: 10–13 December

Aquatics at the 1981 Southeast Asian Games included swimming, diving and water polo events. The three sports of aquatics were held in Manila, Philippines. Aquatics events was held between 10 December to 13 December.

== Medal winners ==
=== Swimming ===
Men's events

Event	Gold		Silver		Bronze	
100 m freestyle	(Indonesia) Lukman Niode	54.40	(Indonesia) Gerald Item	54.80	(Singapore) Tay Khoon Hean	55.56
200 m freestyle	(Philippines) William Wilson	1:58.17	(Indonesia) Lukman Niode	1:58.31	(Indonesia) Gerald Item	2:00.28
400 m freestyle	(Philippines) William Wilson	4:11.68	(Singapore) Soo Tho Kok Mun	4:24.28	(Philippines) Vicente Cheng	4:24.65
1500 m freestyle	(Philippines) William Wilson	16:41.84	(Singapore) Soo Tho Kok Mun	17:16.30	(Indonesia) F. A. Goesarso	17:36.84
100 m backstroke	(Indonesia) Lukman Niode	1:01.13	(Philippines) Richard Luna	1:04.05	(Singapore) David Lim Fong Jock	1:04.32
200 m backstroke	(Indonesia) Lukman Niode	2:15.82	(Singapore) David Lim Fong Jock	2:20.41	(Philippines) Richard Luna	2:22.78
100 m breaststroke	(Philippines) Jairulla Jaitulla	1:09.12	(Indonesia) Tjatur Sugiarto	1:10.36	(Philippines) Francisco Guanco	1:10.62
200 m breaststroke	(Indonesia) Tjatur Sugiarto	2:31.90	(Philippines) Francisco Guanco	2:32.06	(Philippines) Jairulla Jaitulla	2:32.49
100 m butterfly	(Indonesia) John Item	1:00.54	(Philippines) Renato Padronia	1:00.85	(Indonesia) Gerald Item	1:00.90
200 m butterfly	(Indonesia) John Item	2:10.39	(Philippines) William Wilson	2:11.07	(Indonesia) Gerald Item	2:11.20
200 m individual medley	(Indonesia) Gerald Item	2:15.39	(Philippines) Jairulla Jaitulla	2:15.72	(Indonesia) Lukman Niode	2:15.82
400 m individual medley	(Indonesia) Gerald Item	4:47.76	(Indonesia) John Item	4:50.60	(Philippines) William Wilson	4:50.80
4 × 100 m freestyle relay	Indonesia	3:41.46	Singapore	3:44.46	Philippines	3:46.81
4 × 200 m freestyle relay	Indonesia	8:11.56	Philippines	8:23.23	Singapore	8:23.64
4 × 100 m medley relay	Indonesia	4:06.47	Philippines	4:10.26	Singapore	4:12.26

Women's events

Event	Gold		Silver		Bronze	
100 m freestyle	(Malaysia) Helen Chow Hiew Kee	1:01.53	(Indonesia) Nanik Juliati	1:02.99	(Philippines) Christine Jacob	1:03.71
200 m freestyle	(Singapore) Junie Sng	2:10.09	(Indonesia) Elfira Rosa Nasution	2:17.87	(Malaysia) Katerina Ong	2:18.71
400 m freestyle	(Singapore) Junie Sng	4:31.99	(Malaysia) Katerina Ong	4:40.91	(Indonesia) Elfira Rosa Nasution	4:45.54
800 m freestyle	(Singapore) Junie Sng	9:00.21 (rec)	(Malaysia) Katerina Ong	9:26.11	(Indonesia) Elfira Rosa Nasution	9:49.79
100 m backstroke	(Malaysia) Helen Chow Hiew Kee	1:09.92	(Indonesia) Nanik Juliati	1:12.10	(Singapore) Kwek Leng	1:12.12
200 m backstroke	(Indonesia) Nanik Juliati	2:31.77	(Singapore) Kwek Leng	2:32.27	(Indonesia) Pauline Wiwie	2:36.04
100 m breaststroke	(Indonesia) Nanik Juliati	1:18.95	(Malaysia) Helen Chow Hiew Kee	1:19.37	(Indonesia) Sari Yulianti Saad	1:20.21
200 m breaststroke	(Indonesia) Nanik Juliati	2:52.20	(Indonesia) Sari Yulianti Saad	2:56.07	(Philippines) Ma Lourdes Samson	2:56.46
100 m butterfly	(Singapore) Junie Sng	1:05.82 (rec)	(Malaysia) Helen Chow Hiew Kee	1:06.39	(Singapore) Mavis Ee	1:08.20
200 m butterfly	(Singapore) Junie Sng	2:21.20	(Indonesia) Nunung Selowati	2:25.20	(Singapore) Mavis Ee	2:28.11
200 m individual medley	(Singapore) Junie Sng	2:27.55	(Malaysia) Helen Chow Hiew Kee	2:28.27	(Indonesia) Nanik Juliati	2:37.55
400 m individual medley	(Singapore) Junie Sng	5:05.70 (rec)	(Malaysia) Helen Chow Hiew Kee	5:11.58	(Singapore) Mavis Eu	5:34.42
4 × 100 m freestyle relay	Indonesia	4:15.80	Singapore	4:18.95	Philippines	4:21.06
4 × 100 m medley relay	Indonesia	4:44.38	Singapore	4:50.06	Philippines	4:52.98

=== Diving ===
Event	Gold		Silver		Bronze	
Men's springboard 3 m	(Indonesia) Kristendy Permana	520.25	(Thailand) Sangwal Foungdee	500.25	(Indonesia) Taufan Djawahir	493.35
Men's springboard	(Indonesia) Kristendy Permana	490.85	(Thailand) Sangwal Foungdee	454.70	(Indonesia) Haryo Ramayana	398.45
Men's	(Indonesia) Eko Setiawan Lulus	506.15	(Thailand) Somchai Ongkasing	474.15	(Malaysia) Teo Cheng Kiat	426.20
Men's platform	(Thailand) Somchai Ongkasing	453.55	(Indonesia) Eko Setyawan Loeloes	440.65	(Singapore) Richard Tham	415.60
Women's springboard	(Indonesia) Siani Ningsih	373.00	(Indonesia) Lusiana Ambarwati	331.50	(Singapore) Annisa Tai	322.00
Women's springboard 3 m	(Indonesia) Siani Ningsih	416.25	(Indonesia) Lusiana Ambarwati	407.70	(Singapore) Annisa Tai	253.05
Women's	(Indonesia) Siani Ningsih	321.70	(Singapore) Annisa Tai	256.50	(Indonesia) Harli Ramayani	193.75
Women's platform	(Indonesia) Siani Ningsih	308.80	(Indonesia) Dwi Mariastuti	294.26	Not awarded (only 2 competitors)	

=== Water polo ===
Event	Gold	Silver	Bronze
Men's team	Singapore	Indonesia	Malaysia

== Medal table ==
Rank	Nation	Gold	Silver	Bronze	Total
1	Indonesia (INA)	23	14	13	50
2	Singapore (SIN)	8	8	11	27
3	Philippines (PHI)	4	7	10	21
4	Malaysia (MAS)	2	6	3	11
5	Thailand (THA)	1	3	0	4
Totals (5 entries)		38	38	37	113
