= Badminton at the 1981 SEA Games – Women's team =

Badminton – Women's team at the 1981 SEA Games
- Venue: Camp Crame Gymnasium
- Dates: 9 – 10 December 1981
- Nations: 4

Medalists
gold medal	Indonesia (INA)
silver medal	Thailand (THA)
bronze medal	Malaysia (MAL)
bronze medal	Philippines (PHI)

The women's team badminton tournament at the 1981 SEA Games was held from 9 to 10 December 1981 at the Camp Crame Gymnasium in Manila, Philippines.

== Schedule ==
All times are Philippine Standard Time (UTC+08:00)

Date	Time	Event
Wednesday, 9 December	09:00	Semi-finals
Wednesday, 9 December	19:00	Semi-finals
Thursday, 10 December	13:00	Gold medal match

== Bracket ==
Semi-finals
Indonesia (INA)	5
Philippines (PHI)	0
Malaysia (MAL)	0
Thailand (THA)	5

Final
Indonesia (INA)	5
Thailand (THA)	0

== Semi-finals ==
=== Indonesia vs Philippines ===
Indonesia
5
Camp Crame Gymnasium
9 December 1981, 09:00

Philippines
0

			1	2	3
1	(Indonesia) (Philippines)	Verawaty Fadjrin; Diana Del Castillo	11; 0	11; 0
2	(Indonesia) (Philippines)	Ivana Lie; Leonora Rivera	11; 0	11; 2
3	(Indonesia) (Philippines)	Taty Sumirah; Demetrin Santos	15; 0	15; 0
4	(Indonesia) (Philippines)	Ruth Damayanti / Verawaty Fadjrin; Go Giok Leng / Rebecca Villegas	15; 0	15; 1
5	(Indonesia) (Philippines)	Ivana Lie / Imelda Wiguna; Corazon Anuran / Diana Del Castillo	15; 1	15; 1

=== Thailand vs Malaysia ===
Thailand
5
Camp Crame Gymnasium
9 December 1981, 19:00

Malaysia
0

			1	2	3
1	(Thailand) (Malaysia)	Suleeporn Jittariyakul; Leong Chai Lean	11; 4	11; 8
2	(Thailand) (Malaysia)	Penpan Klangthamniem; Kok Chan Fong	11; 6	11; 2
3	(Thailand) (Malaysia)	Jutatip Banjongsilp; Juliet Poon	11; 5	11; 3
4	(Thailand) (Malaysia)	Amporn Kaitpituk / Kanitta Mansamuth; Kok Chan Fong / Katherine Teh	15; 2	15; 2
5	(Thailand) (Malaysia)	Suleeporn Jittariyakul / Sirisriro Patama; Leong Chai Lean / Juliet Poon	9; 15	15; 1	15; 10

== Gold medal match ==
=== Indonesia vs Thailand ===
Indonesia
5
Camp Crame Gymnasium
10 December 1981, 13:00

Thailand
0

			1	2	3
1	(Indonesia) (Thailand)	Verawaty Fadjrin; Jutatip Banjongsilp	11; 3	11; 1
2	(Indonesia) (Thailand)	Ivana Lie; Penpan Klangthamniem	11; 1	11; 9
3	(Indonesia) (Thailand)	Taty Sumirah; Suleeporn Jittariyakul	11; 1	11; 1
4	(Indonesia) (Thailand)	Verawaty Fadjrin / Ruth Damayanti; Suleeporn Jittariyakul / Sirisriro Patama	10; 15	15; 8	15; 9
5	(Indonesia) (Thailand)	Imelda Wiguna / Ivana Lie; Amporn Kaitpituk / Kanitta Mansamuth	15; 3	15; 5

== See also ==
- Individual event tournament
- Men's team tournament
