= Cycling at the 1981 SEA Games =

- Venue: Romulo Highway, Pangasinan and Tarlac, Philippines; Kabataang Barangay Velodrome, Quezon City, Philippines
- Dates: 7–11 December

The Cycling at the 1981 SEA Games were held at Romulo Highway in the provinces of Pangasinan and Tarlac, and the Kabataang Barangay Velodrome in Quezon City, Philippines. Cycling events was held between 7 December to 11 December 1981.

== Medal summary ==
Event	Gold		Silver		Bronze	
1000 m sprint	(Philippines) Rufo Dacumos	12.32	(Philippines) Rodolfo Guaves	12.37	(Indonesia) Wahyudi Hidayat	12.60
800 m massed start	(Philippines) Rufo Dacumos	1:16.14	(Philippines) Rodolfo Guaves	1:16.17	(Indonesia) Wahyudi Hidayat	1:16.25
1600 m massed start	(Philippines) Jomel Lorenzo	2:51.01	(Indonesia) Fanny Patulla	2:51.14	(Philippines) Sotelo Tarayao	2:51.34
4800 m massed start	(Philippines) J. Abaquita	9:25.65	(Malaysia) Jamaluddin Omar	9:25.75	(Philippines) Edgardo Pagarigan	9:25.76
1000 m Individual time trial	(Philippines) Rodolfo Guaves	1:13.73	(Indonesia) Fanny Patulla		(Malaysia) Rosman Alwi	
4000 m Individual pursuit	(Philippines) Diomedes Panton	5:25.49	(Philippines) Renato Meir	5:28.79	(Singapore) Jamaluddin Mohammed	5:31.74
4000 m team pursuit	(Philippines) PHILIPPINES	5:07.50	Singapore Zain Jasmin; Goh Kok Soon; Jamaluddin Mohammed; Jamil Mohammed	5:09.39	(Malaysia) MALAYSIA	5:12.74
4000 m team pursuit final	Philippine Diomedes Panton; Deogracias Asuncion; Renato Mier; Jomel Lorenzo	5:01.26	Malaysia Ishak Amin; Yusoff Udin; Othman Rashid; Shamsuddin Abdullah	5:01.40	Singapore Julius Lim; Goh Kok Soon; Jamaluddin Mohammed; Jamil Mohammed	5:07.46
100 km Road race	Indonesia Sutiyono; Mochammad Yusuf; Das Rizal; Yoseph Lomena	2:15:20.43	Thailand Suriya Rachsaiyakit; Tanachai Srangern; Montol Prangsirisakul; Choosak Seepol	2:18:02.64	(Philippines) PHILIPPINES	2:21:55.00
130 km Road race	(Indonesia) Sutiyono	4:19:14.39	(Indonesia) Mochammad Yusuf	4:20:22	(Philippines) Romeo Bonzo	4:21:21.91
130 km Team road race	(Indonesia) INDONESIA	13:04:04.37	(Philippines) PHILIPPINES	13:09:13.92	(Malaysia) MALAYSIA	14:02:29.61
30.000 m point race	(Philippines) Edgardo Pagarigan	51 pts	(Thailand) Tahanachai Srangern	50	(Philippines) Deogracias Asuncion	44

== Medal table ==
Rank	Nation	Gold	Silver	Bronze	Total
1	Philippines (PHI)	9	4	5	18
2	Indonesia (INA)	3	3	2	8
3	Malaysia (MAS)	0	2	3	5
4	Thailand (THA)	0	2	0	2
5	Singapore (SIN)	0	1	2	3
Totals (5 entries)		12	12	12	36
