= Shooting at the 1981 SEA Games =

- Venue: Fort Bonifacio
- Location: Manila
- Dates: 7–12 December

The Shooting at the 1981 Southeast Asian Games was held between 7 December to 12 December at Fort Bonifacio, Philippines.

== Medal summary ==
=== Men's ===
Event	Gold		Silver		Bronze	
Individual air rifle	(Thailand) Chaiyod Chinokul	561 pts	(Myanmar) Ba Htoo	553	(Indonesia) Ivor Ratulangi	549
Team standard rifle	(Thailand) THAILAND	2.196 pts	(Indonesia) INDONESIA	2.179	(Philippines) PHILIPPINES	2.161
Individual standard rifle	(Thailand) C. Thianthong	567 pts	(Philippines) Jose Mundo	558	(Myanmar) Kyaw Sein	549
Team standard rifle	(Thailand) THAILAND	2.236 pts	(Philippines) PHILIPPINES	2.179	(Myanmar) BURMA	2.145
Individual centre pistol	(Thailand) Charoen Pinchinda	586 pts	(Indonesia) Wisnu Suharyono	584	(Myanmar) Bo Shu	582
Team centre pistol	(Thailand) THAILAND	2.278 pts	(Philippines) PHILIPPINES	2.261	(Indonesia) INDONESIA	2.258
Individual air pistol	(Indonesia) Boy Riswanto	565 pts	(Thailand) Somchai Thongsak	565	(Malaysia) Tawang Ahmad Saufy	550
Team standard pistol	(Thailand) THAILAND	2.234 pts	(Indonesia) INDONESIA	2.228	(Myanmar) BURMA	2.207
Individual standard pistol	(Thailand) Sirin Wangspa	556 pts	(Indonesia) Wisnu Suharyono	547	(Philippines) Nathaniel Padilla	537
Team standard pistol	(Thailand) THAILAND	2.183 pts	(Indonesia) INDONESIA	2.140	(Philippines) PHILIPPINES	2.117
Individual 25 m fire pistol	(Thailand) Supote Poungpittana	586 pts	(Indonesia) Wibowo Suryo	584	(Philippines) Nathaniel Padilla	582
Team 25 m fire pistol	(Thailand) THAILAND	2.315 pts	(Philippines) PHILIPPINES	2.249	(Singapore) SINGAPORE	2.235
Individual 50 m free pistol	(Thailand) Somchai Thongsak	540 pts	(Indonesia) Boy Riswanto	536	(Myanmar) Aung Htay	524
Team 50 m free pistol	(Thailand) THAILAND	2.105 pts	(Indonesia) INDONESIA	2.085	(Myanmar) BURMA	2.047
Small bore free rifle	(Thailand) Manop Leeprasanakul	1.118 pts	(Indonesia) Andi Hendrata	1.108	(Philippines) Albert Adriano	1.093
Team small bore free rifle	(Thailand) THAILAND	4.458 pts	(Philippines) PHILIPPINES	4.339	(Singapore) SINGAPORE	4.330
Individual small bore	(Thailand) Wisit Pratoumbat	595 pts	(Philippines) Jose Medina	587	(Singapore) Mohammed Noor	587
Team small bore	(Thailand) THAILAND	2.353 pts	(Philippines) PHILIPPINES	2.344	(Singapore) SINGAPORE	2.303
Individual skeet	(Thailand) Pichit Burapavong	187 pts	(Singapore) Lee Kum Cheok	587	(Philippines) Yap Melchior	587
Team skeet	(Thailand) THAILAND	536 pts	(Philippines) PHILIPPINES	513	(Indonesia) INDONESIA	497
Individual trap	(Singapore) Lee Kum Cheok	182 pts	(Thailand) Pravit Gajaseni	180	(Philippines) George Earnshaw	177
Team trap	Singapore Lee Kum Cheok; Tan Boon Huat; Frank Oh; Ricky Soon	536 pts	Thailand	512	Philippine	510

=== Women's ===
Event	Gold		Silver		Bronze	
Individual standard rifle	(Thailand) Thiranun Jinda	601 pts	(Philippines) Divina Gracia San Juan	536	(Indonesia) Herman Guwandi	528
Individual pistol match	(Thailand) Aungsumal Jakikasthira	569 pts	(Indonesia) Lely Sampoerno	566	(Philippines) Theresita Talas	559
Team 10 m air rifle	(Indonesia) INDONESIA	1.681 pts	(Thailand) THAILAND	1.664 pts	(Philippines) PHILIPPINES	1.652
Individual 10 m air rifle	(Philippines) Arlene Rodillado		(Thailand) Suporn Rochangkij		(Indonesia) Hermien Guwandi	
Team 10 m air rifle	(Thailand) THAILAND	1.083 pts	(Indonesia) INDONESIA	1.076	(Philippines) PHILIPPINES	1.062
Individual small bore	(Philippines) Chona Gana	586 pts	(Thailand) Thiranun Jinda	584	(Indonesia) Sri Suharti	576
Team small bore	(Philippines) PHILIPPINES	1.751 pts	(Thailand) THAILAND	1.716	(Indonesia) INDONESIA	1.715
Team skeet	(Thailand) THAILAND	536 pts	(Philippines) PHILIPPINES	513	(Indonesia) INDONESIA	483

== Medal table ==
Rank	Nation	Gold	Silver	Bronze	Total
1	Thailand (THA)	23	6	1	30
2	Philippines (PHI)	3	11	10	24
3	Indonesia (INA)	2	11	7	20
4	Singapore (SIN)	2	1	4	7
5	Burma (BIR)	0	1	7	8
6	Malaysia (MAS)	0	0	1	1
Totals (6 entries)		30	30	30	90
