= Swimming at the 1978 Asian Games =

Swimming contested at 1978 Asian Games in Bangkok, Thailand

- Venue: Kasetsart University
- Dates: 12–17 December 1978

Swimming was contested at the 1978 Asian Games in Kasetsart University, Bangkok, Thailand from December 12 to December 17, 1978.

== Medalists ==
=== Men ===
Event	Gold		Silver		Bronze	
100 m freestyle	Tsuyoshi Yanagidate; Japan	54.10; GR	Guo Ruishan; China	54.25	Gerardo Rosario; Philippines	54.28
200 m freestyle	Gerardo Rosario; Philippines	1:56.68; GR	Kristiono Sumono; Indonesia	1:56.76	Hiroshi Sakamoto; Japan	1:57.33
400 m freestyle	Shuji Tsukasaki; Japan	4:06.83; GR	Kazuhiko Yoshihara; Japan	4:07.22	Kristiono Sumono; Indonesia	4:08.30
1500 m freestyle	Shuji Tsukasaki; Japan	16:14.92; GR	Takehiko Kawakami; Japan	16:47.83	Mark Joseph; Philippines	16:49.87
100 m backstroke	Kenji Ikeda; Japan	1:00.76; GR	Tsuyoshi Takahashi; Japan	1:01.27	Tang Qun; China	1:01.96
200 m backstroke	Tsuyoshi Takahashi; Japan	2:10.87; GR	Tang Qun; China	2:12.48	Kenji Ikeda; Japan	2:13.52
100 m breaststroke	Shigehiro Takahashi; Japan	1:04.94; GR	Hiroshi Kabatani; Japan	1:05.75	Wang Lin; China	1:06.42
200 m breaststroke	Shigehiro Takahashi; Japan	2:22.56; GR	Hiroshi Kabatani; Japan	2.23.71	Wang Lin; China	2:26.43
100 m butterfly	Shinsuke Kayama; Japan	58.41	Luo Zhaoying; China	58.58	Gerald Item; Indonesia	59.64
200 m butterfly	Shinsuke Kayama; Japan	2:06.68; GR	Gerald Item; Indonesia	2:08.46	Cho Oh-ryun; South Korea	2:09.19
200 m individual medley	Tsuyoshi Yanagidate; Japan	2:10.22; GR	Kozo Tatsumi; Japan	2:11.95	Gerald Item; Indonesia	2:14.04
400 m individual medley	Kozo Tatsumi; Japan	4:40.80; GR	Tsuyoshi Yanagidate; Japan	4:40.86	Gerald Item; Indonesia	4:46.56
4 × 100 m freestyle relay	Japan; Hiroshi Sakamoto; Shinya Izumi; Shigeki Yamazaki; Tsuyoshi Yanagidate	3:35.91; GR	China; Cui Fang; Huang Guangliang; Mo Zhengjie; Zhong Guiyu	3:39.63	Indonesia; Gerald Item; Dwi Widjayanto; John David Item; Kristiono Sumono	3:40.24
4 × 200 m freestyle relay	Japan; Kazuhiko Yoshihara; Hiroshi Sakamoto; Shigeki Yamazaki; Tsuyoshi Yanagidate	7:49.75; GR	Indonesia; Dwi Widjayanto; John David Item; Gerald Item; Kristiono Sumono	8:05.55	Philippines; Vicente Cheng; Mark Joseph; Jairulla Jaitulla; Gerardo Rosario	8:07.10
4 × 100 m medley relay	Japan; Kenji Ikeda; Shigehiro Takahashi; Shinsuke Kayama; Shigeki Yamazaki	3:56.97; GR	China; Tang Qun; Wang Lin; Fan Liuke; Lu Zhurong	4:01.08	Indonesia; Lukman Niode; Kun Hantyo; Gerald Item; Dwi Widjayanto	4:03.98

=== Women ===
Event	Gold		Silver		Bronze	
100 m freestyle	Sachiko Yamazaki; Japan	1:00.30; GR	Shiho Sakanishi; Japan	1:00.84	Ratchaneewan Bulakul; Thailand	1:01.41
200 m freestyle	Ratchaneewan Bulakul; Thailand	2:09.98; GR	Junie Sng; Singapore	2:11.08	Sachiko Yamazaki; Japan	2:11.09
400 m freestyle	Junie Sng; Singapore	4:31.35; GR	Kana Kamo; Japan	4:32.86	Ratchaneewan Bulakul; Thailand	4:34.08
800 m freestyle	Junie Sng; Singapore	9:18.33; GR	Kana Kamo; Japan	9:22.48	Magumi Tochihara; Japan	9:29.83
100 m backstroke	Hisae Asari; Japan	1:06.74; GR	Naoko Miura; Japan	1:07.23	Choi Yun-jung; South Korea	1:09.57
200 m backstroke	Hisae Asari; Japan	2:23.12; GR	Naoko Miura; Japan	2:25.13	Choi Yun-jung; South Korea	2:26.91
100 m breaststroke	Chieko Watanabe; Japan	1:16.04; GR	Liang Weifen; China	1:17.06	Chiharu Mori; Japan	1:17.19
200 m breaststroke	Chieko Watanabe; Japan	2:41.01; GR	Chiharu Mori; Japan	2:46.01	Liang Weifen; China	2:47.50
100 m butterfly	Yasue Hatsuda; Japan	1:03.56; GR	Naoko Kume; Japan	1:03.84	Shao Tongmei; China	1:07.99
200 m butterfly	Yasue Hatsuda; Japan	2:15.79; GR	Naoko Kume; Japan	2:16.80	Nunung Selowati; Indonesia	2:25.45
200 m individual medley	Mie Hirata; Japan	2:27.98	Yuko Imamichi; Japan	2:29.06	Liang Weifen; China	2:30.12
400 m individual medley	Mie Hirata; Japan	5:08.34; GR	Yuko Imamichi; Japan	5:11.43	Naniek Suwadji; Indonesia	5:22.73
4 × 100 m freestyle relay	Japan; Sachiko Yamazaki; Shiho Sakanishi; Mika Saito; Makiko Takahashi	4:03.58; GR	China; Lou Yinghua; Liu Yafang; Cheng Fengying; Yu Ping	4:12.43	Thailand; Sumatana Pingkalawan; Sirirat Changkasiri; Sansanee Changkasiri; Ratchaneewan Bulakul	4:17.50
4 × 100 m medley relay	Japan; Hisae Asari; Chieko Watanabe; Yasue Hatsuda; Sachiko Yamazaki	4:27.16; GR	China; Chen Weiying; Liang Weifen; Shao Tongmei; Liang Xiuqiong	4:39.54	Indonesia; Naniek Suwadji; Anita Sapardjiman; Tati Irianti Erningpraja; Nunung Selowati	4:45.46

== Medal table ==
Rank	Nation	Gold	Silver	Bronze	Total
1	Japan (JPN)	25	17	5	47
2	Singapore (SIN)	2	1	0	3
3	Philippines (PHI)	1	0	3	4
3	Thailand (THA)	1	0	3	4
5	China (CHN)	0	8	6	14
6	Indonesia (INA)	0	3	9	12
7	South Korea (KOR)	0	0	3	3
Totals (7 entries)		29	29	29	87
