= Helen Chow =

Malaysian swimmer (born 1965)

Personal information
- Born: 17 August 1965 (age 60)

Sport
- Sport: Swimming
Medal record
Representing Malaysia
SEA Games
| Silver medal – second place | 1979 Jakarta | 100m backstroke |
| Bronze medal – third place | 1979 Jakarta | 100m freestyle |

Helen Chow (born 17 August 1965) is a Malaysian swimmer. She competed in four events at the 1984 Summer Olympics.
