= Liang Weifen =

Chinese swimmer (born 1962)

Personal information
- Born: July 28, 1962 (age 64)

Sport
- Sport: Swimming
- Strokes: Breaststroke, medley
Medal record
Representing China
Summer Universiade
Silver medal – second place	1981 Bucharest	100m breaststroke
Asian Games
Silver medal – second place	1978 Bangkok	100m breaststroke
Silver medal – second place	1978 Bangkok	4x100m medley relay
Bronze medal – third place	1978 Bangkok	200m breaststroke
Bronze medal – third place	1978 Bangkok	200m individual medley
Bronze medal – third place	1982 New Delhi	200m breaststroke

Liang Weifen (born 28 July 1962) is a Chinese former swimmer who competed in the 1984 Summer Olympics.
