= Wang Lin (swimmer) =

Chinese swimmer (born 1959)

Personal information
- Born: January 3, 1959 (age 67)

Sport
- Sport: Swimming
- Strokes: Breaststroke
Medal record
Representing China
Asian Games
Silver medal – second place	1978 Bangkok	4x100m medley relay
Bronze medal – third place	1978 Bangkok	100m breaststroke
Bronze medal – third place	1978 Bangkok	200m breaststroke

Wang Lin (Original: 王•林) is a Chinese former swimmer who competed in the 1984 Summer Olympics.

He was born 3 January 1959.

Lin won several medals at the Asian Games (0–1–2 1978 Bangkok SWM silver: 4×100 m medley relay, bronze: 100 m breaststroke and 200 m breaststroke).

His completed Olympic events include:

100 metres Breaststroke, Men (Olympic)

4 × 100 metres Medley Relay, Men (Olympic)
