= Bowling at the 1981 SEA Games =

- Venue: Celebrity Bowl
- Location: Manila, Philippines
- Dates: 8–12 December

The Bowling at the 1981 SEA Games was held between 08 December to 12 December at Celebrity Bowl, Manila, Philippines.

== Medal summary ==
=== Men's ===
Event	Gold		Silver		Bronze	
Individual	(Philippines) Olie Ongtawco	1.270 pts	(Singapore) Ronnie Ng	1.261	(Philippines) Paeng Nepomuceno	1.253
Double	(Philippines) Paeng Nepomuceno (Philippines) Ed Bermudez	2.431 pts	(Philippines) Olie Ongtawco (Philippines) Rene Reyes	2.412	(Indonesia) Herry Hendrawan (Indonesia) Hendro Pratomo	2.341
Trio	Philippines Paeng Nepomuceno; Ed Bermudez; Olie Ongtawco	3.564 pts	Indonesia Harapan Matondang; Abidin Saleh; Indra Gondokusumo	3.446	Thailand Kassem Minalai; Montri Cheeratana; Suphote Peernasophon	3.438
Five	Thailand	5.875 pts	Philippines	5.794	Indonesia	5.480
Master's	(Thailand) Suphote Peernasophon	1.179 pts	(Singapore) Ronnie Ng	1.134	(Philippines) Del Galera	1.133

=== Women's ===
Event	Gold		Silver		Bronze	
Individual	(Thailand) Porntip Singha	1.179 pts	(Philippines) Bong Coo	1.134	(Indonesia) Lanny Budiaman	1.133
Double	(Philippines) Bong Coo (Philippines) Rita de la Rosa	2.312 pts	(Philippines) Arianne Cerdeña (Philippines) Rose de Leon	2.282	(Malaysia) Rita Goh (Malaysia) Lily Chan	2.276
Trio	Philippines Bong Coo; Rose de Leon; Rita de la Rosa	3.524 pts	Indonesia Lanny Budiaman; Inge Syarif; Lita Muaya	3.364	Thailand Porntip Singha; Orawan Nithinavakorn; Luyong Kunaksorn	3.286
Five	Thailand	5.518 pts	Philippines	5.417	Malaysia	5.320

== Medal table ==
Rank	Nation	Gold	Silver	Bronze	Total
1	Philippines (PHI)	5	5	2	12
2	Thailand (THA)	4	0	2	6
3	Indonesia (INA)	0	2	3	5
4	Singapore (SIN)	0	2	0	2
5	Malaysia (MAS)	0	0	2	2
Totals (5 entries)		9	9	9	27
