= Kris Sumono =

Indonesian swimmer (born 1958)

Personal information
- Full name: Kristiono Sumono
- Born: 23 December 1958 (age 67) Banda Aceh, Indonesia

Sport
- Sport: Swimming
Medal record
Men's swimming
Representing Indonesia
Asian Games
Silver medal – second place	1978 Bangkok	200 m freestyle
Silver medal – second place	1978 Bangkok	4×200 m freestyle
Bronze medal – third place	1978 Bangkok	400 m freestyle
Bronze medal – third place	1978 Bangkok	4×100 m freestyle
SEA Games
Gold medal – first place	1977 Kuala Lumpur	100m freestyle
Gold medal – first place	1977 Kuala Lumpur	200m freestyle
Gold medal – first place	1977 Kuala Lumpur	400m freestyle
Gold medal – first place	1977 Kuala Lumpur	1500m freestyle
Gold medal – first place	1977 Kuala Lumpur	4x200m freestyle

Kris Sumono (born 23 December 1958) is an Indonesian former swimmer. He competed in four events at the 1976 Summer Olympics.
