= Marc Tay =

Singaporean swimmer and ophthalmologist (1959/1960–2023)

- Born: Marc Tay Tze-Hsin; 1959/1960; State of Singapore
- Died: 15 August 2023 (aged 63); Singapore
- Occupations: Swimmer, ophthalmologist

Marc Tay Tze-Hsin (1959/1960 – 15 August 2023) was a Singaporean competitive swimmer and ophthalmologist. He broke the national under-17 100-metre freestyle record in April 1977 and was named Sportsboy of the Year by the Singapore Sports Council. Tay represented Singapore in swimming at four editions of the biennial SEA Games. As an eye surgeon, he served as part of the Singapore Armed Forces' medical team in Riyadh during the Gulf War. Tay later worked at the Singapore National Eye Centre, before founding his own clinic. In 2014, Tay was convicted, fined and suspended from practising for failing to report undisclosed income.

== Career ==
=== Swimming ===
Tay began swimming at the age of eight. He attended Anglo-Chinese Junior College and was coached by Lenn Wei Ling and Wee Moh Nam. In April 1977, Tay broke the national 100-metre freestyle record for his under-17 age group by 0.22 seconds with a time of 56.08 seconds.

Tay qualified for the 1977 SEA Games in Kuala Lumpur after beating Mark Chan to win the 100-metre freestyle at the Singapore Open in Toa Payoh. In Kuala Lumpur, Tay finished third in the 100-metre freestyle. In May 1978, he was selected as the 1977 Sportsboy of the Year by the Singapore Sports Council (SSC).

In September 1982, Singapore Amateur Swimming Association (SASA) secretary Woon Sui Kut claimed that Tay had qualified for the 100-metre freestyle at the year's Asian Games with a time of 54 seconds. Both SASA vice-president Fong Hoe Beng and Tay himself rejected Woon's claim; Tay added that he had not put up a time of 54 seconds in the 100-metre freestyle since 1978. Tay's competitive swimming career ended the same year. Overall, he represented Singapore at four editions of the SEA Games and secured two golds, three silvers, and three bronzes.

=== Ophthalmology ===
Tay served in the Singapore Armed Forces (SAF) for seven years and attained the rank of major. He was part of the SAF's Gulf War medical team who were based in the British Army Rear Hospital in Riyadh from January to March 1991. As one of two ophthalmologists (the other being a Briton) who together covered twelve-hour shifts at the hospital, Tay described the experience as an "eye-opener". In July 1991, he was presented with the Overseas Service Medal (Operational Service) by Minister for Defence Yeo Ning Hong. In January 1993, he was presented with the Gulf Medal by British High Commissioner Gordon Duggan.

Tay left the army in September 1992 to work at the Singapore National Eye Centre. He subsequently went into private practice; in 2001, his clinic, Tay Eye Surgery, was sold to Pacific Healthcare Specialist Services (PHSS). Tay became a consultant to PHSS and received an annual gross remuneration of S$396,000, on the condition that all salary from elsewhere be surrendered to PHSS. Between December 2005 and December 2006, Tay was paid S$445,874 by a local LASIK clinic; however, he did not disclose this to PHSS.

Sometime before February 2009, the Corrupt Practices Investigation Bureau (CPIB) began investigating the matter, which was eventually brought to court. Tay was charged with eleven counts of misappropriating funds and one count of violating the Companies Act. On 26 February 2014, Chief District Judge See Kee Oon ruled against Tay and fined him S$32,000. A disciplinary tribunal convened by the Singapore Medical Council (SMC) likewise found that Tay's actions "could not be characterised as a mere breach of an employment contract" and suspended him from 25 April to 24 July 2016.

== Personal life and death ==
Like his father, who was an electrical engineer, Tay enjoyed motorcycling in his free time. He was also a prolific water polo player.

Tay died on 15 August 2023, at the age of 63. Former national swimmer Patricia Chan described Tay as "always very helpful, a very giving chap".
