= Shigehiro Takahashi =

Japanese swimmer (born 1961)

Personal information
- Full name: Shigehiro Takahashi
- Nationality: Japanese
- Born: June 15, 1961 (age 65) Shiga, Japan
- Height: 1.81 m (5 ft 11 in)
- Weight: 73 kg (161 lb)

Sport
- Sport: Swimming
- Strokes: Breaststroke
Medal record
Men's swimming
Representing Japan
Asian Games
Gold medal – first place	1978 Bangkok	100 m breaststroke
Gold medal – first place	1978 Bangkok	200 m breaststroke
Summer Universiade
Gold medal – first place	1983 Edmonton	100 m breaststroke
Silver medal – second place	1983 Edmonton	200 m breaststroke

Shigehiro Takahashi (高橋 繁浩, Takahashi Shigehiro; born 15 June 1961) is a former Japanese swimmer who competed in the 1984 Summer Olympics and in the 1988 Summer Olympics.
