= Shinsuke Kayama =

Japanese swimmer (born 1959)

Personal information
- Born: 23 May 1959 (age 67) Hiroshima, Japan

Sport
- Sport: Swimming
Medal record
Representing Japan
Asian Games
Gold medal – first place	1978 Bangkok	100m butterfly
Gold medal – first place	1978 Bangkok	200m butterfly
Gold medal – first place	1978 Bangkok	4x100m medley relay

Shinsuke Kayama (香山 進介, Kayama Shinsuke; born 23 May 1959) is a Japanese former swimmer. He competed in two events at the 1976 Summer Olympics.
