= Gymnastics at the 1981 SEA Games =

1981 Southeast Asian Games

- Venue: University of the Philippines Diliman, Quezon City, Philippines
- Dates: 7–11 December

Gymnastics events at the 1981 Southeast Asian Games was held between 7 December to 11 December at the University of Philippines Diliman, Quezon City, Philippines.

== Medal summary ==
=== Men ===
Event	Gold		Silver		Bronze	
Individual all-round	(Philippines) Rolando Albuera	96.65 pts	(Thailand) Sophon Sriesan	96.40	(Philippines) Luisito Hilario	95.85
Floor exercise	(Indonesia) Syaiful Nazar	17.95 pts	(Thailand) Sophon Sriesan	17.85	(Philippines) Luisito Hilario	17.25
Horizontal bars	(Thailand) Sophon Sriesan	16.65 pts	(Philippines) Luisito Hilario	16.10	(Thailand) Areekul Nanakorn	16.05
Parallel bars	(Philippines) Luisito Hilario	16.20 pts	(Thailand) Sophon Sriesan	16.10	(Thailand) Areekul Nanakorn	16.05
Pommel horse	(Thailand) Teeruch Popanich	16.00 pts	(Philippines) Rolando Albuera	15.40	(Philippines) Antonio Valenzuela	14.40
Rings	(Philippines) Rolando Albuera	15.90 pts	(Indonesia) Widodo	15.10	(Philippines) Luisito Hilario (Thailand) Areekul Nanakorn	15.05
Vaults	(Indonesia) Syaiful Nazar	17.75 pts	(Singapore) Lim Tze Yen	17.675	(Philippines) Rolando Albuera	17.65
Men's Team	Thailand	233.35 pts	Philippines	230.30	Indonesia	207.95

=== Women's ===
Event	Gold		Silver		Bronze	
Individual	(Thailand) Theeraporn Pompanich	71.40 pts	(Indonesia) Murdasih Supardjo	69.50	(Indonesia) Meirina Prasetyo	68.85
Balance beam	(Indonesia) Meirina Prasetyo	17.95 pts	(Indonesia) Murdasih Supardjo	17.65	(Thailand) Chawalida Promsakha	17.00
Floor Exercise	(Thailand) Chawalida Promsakha	18.00 pts	(Indonesia) Murdasih Supardjo	17.55	(Thailand) Theeraporn Pompanich	17.45
Uneven bars	(Thailand) Theeraporn Pompanich	18.35 pts	(Indonesia) Meirina Prasetyo	18.00	(Thailand) Theeraporn Pompanich	17.30
Vaults	(Thailand) Theeraporn Pompanich	17.50 pts	(Indonesia) Meirina Prasetyo	17.30	(Thailand) Theeraporn Pompanich	16.55
Women's Team	Indonesia	169.70 pts	Thailand	165.05	Philippines	141.6

== Medal table ==
Rank	Nation	Gold	Silver	Bronze	Total
1	Thailand (THA)	7	4	7	18
2	Indonesia (INA)	4	6	2	12
3	Philippines (PHI)	3	3	6	12
4	Singapore (SIN)	0	1	0	1
Totals (4 entries)		14	14	15	43
