= Hiroshi Sakamoto =

Japanese swimmer (born 1960)

Personal information
- Born: June 26, 1960 (age 66)

Sport
- Sport: Swimming
Medal record
Representing Japan
Asian Games
| Gold medal – first place | 1978 Bangkok | 4x100m freestyle relay |
| Gold medal – first place | 1978 Bangkok | 4x200m freestyle relay |
| Bronze medal – third place | 1978 Bangkok | 200m freestyle |

Hiroshi Sakamoto (坂本 弘, Sakamoto Hiroshi; born 26 June 1960) is a former Japanese swimmer who competed in the 1984 Summer Olympics.
