= Judo at the 1981 SEA Games =

Events at the Southeast Asian Games

- Venue: Fort Bonifacio, Philippines
- Dates: 10–14 December

The Judo at the 1981 Southeast Asian Games was held between 10 December to 14 December at Fort Bonifacio, Philippines.

== Medal summary ==
=== Men ===
Event	Gold	Silver	Bronze
>60 kg	(Thailand) Sandhisiri Pakit	(Myanmar) Myint Tay	(Singapore) Low Chee Kiang
65 kg	(Philippines) Noel Gomez	(Singapore) Chng Kiong Choon	(Thailand) Y. Boonyaleka
71 kg	(Philippines) Oscar Bautista	(Singapore) Kong Fook Wai	(Thailand) H. Rojanachiva
78 kg	(Thailand) K. Thawatchi	(Indonesia) Yono Budiono	(Philippines) Rolan Ilamas
86 kg	(Indonesia) Chandra Haryanto	(Philippines) Narzal Garcia	no bronze winner
91 kg	(Thailand) I. Pisak	(Philippines) Andrea Sachion	(Singapore) Tan Seow Yew
95 kg	(Indonesia) Perrence George Pantouw	(Singapore) Koh Eng Kian	(Malaysia) Goh Wing Wai
Open	(Indonesia) Perrence George Pantouw	(Singapore) Chandra Haryanto	(Philippines) Narzal Garcia

=== Women ===
Event	Gold	Silver	Bronze
>48 kg	(Thailand) Muenvichit Chalermsri	(Myanmar) Christine Tinlay	(Philippines) Victoria Macapagal
52 kg	(Indonesia) Sri Rahayu	(Thailand) B. Parnthip	(Malaysia) Ho Lee Thee
54 kg	(Indonesia) E. Thiastuti	(Thailand) Y. Lamai	(Singapore) Lee Yin Wah
56 kg	(Indonesia) Maria Paula Pantouw	(Philippines) Maria Theresa Padre	(Thailand) Pornpen Ngamchuen
66 kg	(Myanmar) Khin Mu Mu	(Thailand) Prasert Rittikul	(Indonesia) Sayu Gde Pujiati
72 kg	(Malaysia) Nicholas Peggy Evelyn	(Philippines) Ellen Tinio	(Indonesia) Ida Iriani Kandi
78 kg	(Indonesia) Elly Amalia	(Thailand) Pantien Bangorn	no bronze winner
Open	(Indonesia) Elly Amalia	(Malaysia) Nicholas Peggy Evelyn	(Philippines) Ellen Tinio

== Medal table ==
Rank	Nation	Gold	Silver	Bronze	Total
1	Indonesia (INA)	8	2	2	12
2	Thailand (THA)	4	4	3	11
3	Philippines (PHI)	2	4	4	10
4	Burma (BIR)	1	2	0	3
5	Malaysia (MAS)	1	1	2	4
6	Singapore (SIN)	0	3	3	6
Totals (6 entries)		16	16	14	46
