= Naoko Kume =

Japanese swimmer (born 1963)

Personal information
- Born: 29 April 1963 (age 63)

Sport
- Sport: Swimming
Medal record
Women's swimming
Representing Japan
Asian Games
Silver medal – second place	1978 Bangkok	100 m butterfly
Silver medal – second place	1978 Bangkok	200 m butterfly
Universiade
Silver medal – second place	1983 Edmonton	200 m butterfly
Bronze medal – third place	1983 Edmonton	100 m butterfly

Naoko Kume (久米 直子, Kume Naoko; born 29 April 1963) is a Japanese swimmer. She competed in two events at the 1984 Summer Olympics.
