= Chiharu Mori =

Japanese swimmer (born 1962)

Personal information
- Born: 20 February 1962 (age 64)

Sport
- Sport: Swimming
Medal record
Representing Japan
Asian Games
Silver medal – second place	1978 Bangkok	200m breaststroke
Bronze medal – third place	1978 Bangkok	100m breaststroke

Chiharu Mori (森 千春, Mori Chiharu; born 20 February 1962) is a Japanese former swimmer. She competed in the women's 200 metre breaststroke at the 1976 Summer Olympics.
