= Naoko Miura =

Japanese swimmer (born 1959)

Personal information
- Born: 1 September 1959 (age 66)

Sport
- Sport: Swimming
Medal record
Representing Japan
Asian Games
Silver medal – second place	1978 Bangkok	100m backstroke
Silver medal – second place	1978 Bangkok	200m backstroke

Naoko Miura (三浦 直子, Miura Naoko; born 1 September 1959) is a Japanese former swimmer. She competed in two events at the 1976 Summer Olympics.
