= Sachiko Yamazaki =

Japanese swimmer (born 1962)

Personal information
- Born: 3 June 1962 (age 64)

Sport
- Sport: Swimming
- Strokes: Freestyle
Medal record
Women's swimming
Representing Japan
Asian Games
Gold medal – first place	1978 Bangkok	100 m freestyle
Gold medal – first place	1978 Bangkok	4×100 m freestyle
Gold medal – first place	1978 Bangkok	4×100 m medley
Bronze medal – third place	1978 Bangkok	200 m freestyle

Sachiko Yamazaki (山崎 幸子, Yamazaki Sachiko; born 3 June 1962) is a Japanese former freestyle swimmer. She competed in two events at the 1976 Summer Olympics.
