= Tiranan Khajornklinmala =

Thai sport shooter (born 1957)

Personal information
- Nationality: Thai
- Born: 30 July 1957 (age 67); Thailand

Sport
- Sport: Sports shooting

Tiranan Khajornklinmala née Jinda (Thai: ถิรนันท์ ขจรกลิ่นมาลา (จินดา), born 30 July 1957) is a Thai sport shooter and military officer. She competed in rifle shooting events at the 1984 Summer Olympics and the 1988 Summer Olympics, and won a bronze medal in the 50-m rifle prone team event at the 1998 Asian Games. As of 2009, she is a lieutenant colonel in the Royal Thai Army.

== Olympic results ==
Event	1984	1988
50 metre rifle three positions (women)	T-20th	T-34th
