= Francisco Guanco =

Filipino swimmer

Personal information
- Born: 11 December 1964 (age 61)

Sport
- Sport: Swimming
Medal record
Representing Philippines
SEA Games
Gold medal – first place	1983 Singapore	200m breaststroke
Silver medal – second place	1981 Manila	200m breaststroke
Silver medal – second place	1981 Manila	4x100m medley relay
Silver medal – second place	1983 Singapore	100m breaststroke
Silver medal – second place	1985 Bangkok	200m breaststroke
Bronze medal – third place	1981 Manila	100m breaststroke
Bronze medal – third place	1983 Singapore	4x100m medley relay

Francisco Guanco (born 11 December 1964) is a Filipino swimmer. He competed in two events at the 1984 Summer Olympics.
