= Gerald Item =

Indonesian swimmer (1960–2019)

Personal information
- Nationality: Indonesia
- Born: 17 November 1960 Jakarta, Indonesia
- Died: 23 May 2019 (aged 58) Riverside, California, U.S.

Sport
- Sport: Swimming
Medal record
Representing Indonesia
Asian Games
Silver medal – second place	1978 Bangkok	200m butterfly
Silver medal – second place	1978 Bangkok	4x200m freestyle relay
Bronze medal – third place	1978 Bangkok	100m butterfly
Bronze medal – third place	1978 Bangkok	200m individual medley
Bronze medal – third place	1978 Bangkok	400m individual medley
Bronze medal – third place	1978 Bangkok	4x100m freestyle relay
Bronze medal – third place	1978 Bangkok	4x100m medley relay
Bronze medal – third place	1982 New Delhi	4x100m freestyle relay
Bronze medal – third place	1982 New Delhi	4x200m freestyle relay
Bronze medal – third place	1982 New Delhi	4x100m medley relay

Gerald Herman Peter Item (17 November 1960 – 23 May 2019) was an Indonesian swimmer. He competed in numerous international sporting events representing Indonesia. At the 1978 Asian Games, he won seven medals. At the 1982 Asian Games, he collected three bronze medals in relay events. Item also participated in the Southeast Asian Games of 1977, 1979 and 1981 and received a total of seventeen individual medals (not counting relay events), including five gold in 1979 alone.

After retiring from swimming, he and his wife, Elfira Nasution, formed a swimming club named Elfira Swima Gemilang (ESG). He and his family left Indonesia in 2009 where he moved to Riverside, California and started coaching there.

== Early life ==
Item was born in Jakarta, Indonesia to Willem and Elsje Item. He went to Coronado High School in San Diego, California, where he also became a swimmer. During his time at high school, he won two CIF event which led his team to a CIF title.

== Death ==
He died while coaching in Riverside on 23 May 2019.
