= Lukman Niode =

Indonesian swimmer (1963–2020)

Personal information
- Born: 21 October 1963 Jakarta, Indonesia
- Died: 17 April 2020 (aged 56) Jakarta, Indonesia

Sport
- Sport: Swimming
Medal record
Men's swimming
Representing Indonesia
Asian Games
Bronze medal – third place	1978 Bangkok	4x100 m medley
Bronze medal – third place	1982 New Delhi	100 m freestyle
Bronze medal – third place	1982 New Delhi	100 m backstroke
Bronze medal – third place	1982 New Delhi	200 m backstroke
Bronze medal – third place	1982 New Delhi	4x100 m freestyle
Bronze medal – third place	1982 New Delhi	4x200 m freestyle
Bronze medal – third place	1982 New Delhi	4x100 m medley
SEA Games
Gold medal – first place	1977 Kuala Lumpur	100 m backstroke
Gold medal – first place	1977 Kuala Lumpur	200 m backstroke
Gold medal – first place	1979 Jakarta	100 m backstroke
Gold medal – first place	1979 Jakarta	200 m backstroke
Gold medal – first place	1981 Manila	100 m freestyle
Gold medal – first place	1981 Manila	100 m backstroke
Gold medal – first place	1981 Manila	200 m backstroke
Gold medal – first place	1983 Singapore	100 m backstroke
Gold medal – first place	1983 Singapore	200 m backstroke
Silver medal – second place	1981 Manila	200 m freestyle
Silver medal – second place	1983 Singapore	200 m freestyle
Silver medal – second place	1985 Bangkok	100 m backstroke
Silver medal – second place	1985 Bangkok	200 m backstroke
Bronze medal – third place	1981 Manila	200 m individual medley
Bronze medal – third place	1983 Singapore	100 m freestyle
Bronze medal – third place	1985 Bangkok	200 m individual medley

Lukman Niode (21 October 1963 – 17 April 2020) was an Indonesian swimmer. He competed in numerous domestic and international events including three events at the 1984 Summer Olympics, but was eliminated in the heats in all three events.

Lukman died on 17 April 2020 in Pelni Hospital in Jakarta at the age of 56, due to COVID-19 during the pandemic.
