= Diomedes Panton =

Filipino cyclist

Personal information
- Born: October 20, 1960 (age 65)
- Height: 175 cm (5 ft 9 in)
- Weight: 69 kg (152 lb)

Cycling career
- Sport: Cycling
Medal record
Men's track cycling
Representing Philippines
Southeast Asian Games
Gold medal – first place	1981 Manila	4km individual pursuit

Diomedes Panton (born October 20, 1960) is a Filipino former cyclist. He competed in the individual pursuit event at the 1984 Summer Olympics. Panton also won the gold medal at the Men's 4 km. individual pursuit in track racing at the Southeast Asian Games, beating fellow Filipino cyclist, Renato Mier, at the Kabataang Barangay Velodrome. At the 1982 Asian Games he won the bronze medal in the team pursuit. At the Southeast Asian Games he won the single pursuit ahead of his compatriot Renato Mier. He did not return to his homeland after the Olympic Games.
