= Ratchaneewan Bulakul =

Thai swimmer (born 1963)

Personal information
- Born: 1 July 1963 (age 63)

Sport
- Sport: Swimming
Medal record
Representing Thailand
Asian Games
| Gold medal – first place | 1978 Bangkok | 200m freestyle |
| Bronze medal – third place | 1978 Bangkok | 100m freestyle |
| Bronze medal – third place | 1978 Bangkok | 400m freestyle |
| Bronze medal – third place | 1978 Bangkok | 4x100m freestyle relay |
SEA Games
| Gold medal – first place | 1975 Bangkok | 200m freestyle |
| Gold medal – first place | 1975 Bangkok | 400m freestyle |
| Silver medal – second place | 1975 Bangkok | 100m freestyle |
| Silver medal – second place | 1975 Bangkok | 800m freestyle |
| Bronze medal – third place | 1973 Singapore | 800m freestyle |
| Bronze medal – third place | 1973 Singapore | 4x100m freestyle relay |
| Bronze medal – third place | 1973 Singapore | 4x100m medley relay |

Ratchaneewan Bulakul (born 1 July 1963) is a Thai former swimmer. She competed in three events at the 1976 Summer Olympics.
