= William Wilson (swimmer) =

Filipino swimmer (born 1964)

Personal information
- Born: 19 November 1964 (age 61)
- Height: 5'8
- Weight: 170

Sport
- Sport: Swimming
- Strokes: Freestyle
Medal record
Men's swimming
Representing Philippines
Asian Games
Gold medal – first place	1982 New Delhi	200 m freestyle
Silver medal – second place	1982 New Delhi	400 m freestyle
Bronze medal – third place	1982 New Delhi	1500 m freestyle
Southeast Asian Games
Gold medal – first place	1979 Jakarta	400 m freestyle
Gold medal – first place	1981 Manila	200 m freestyle
Gold medal – first place	1981 Manila	400 m freestyle
Gold medal – first place	1981 Manila	1500 m freestyle
Gold medal – first place	1983 Singapore	200 m freestyle
Gold medal – first place	1983 Singapore	400 m freestyle
Gold medal – first place	1985 Bangkok	200 m freestyle
Gold medal – first place	1985 Bangkok	400 m freestyle
Gold medal – first place	1985 Bangkok	1500 m freestyle
Bronze medal – third place	1979 Jakarta	1500 m freestyle
Bronze medal – third place	1985 Bangkok	4×100 m freestyle relay

William Wilson (born 19 November 1964) is a Filipino former swimmer. He competed in four events at the 1984 Summer Olympics. Father of Brock and Brodhi
