= Irianti Erningpraja =

Indonesian singer (1965–2025)

- Born: Tati Irianti; 18 November 1965; Jakarta, Indonesia
- Died: 27 May 2025 (aged 59); Jakarta, Indonesia
- Occupations: singer-songwriter; swimmer
- Musical career
- Genres: Pop
- Years active: 1977–2011

Tati Irianti Erningpradja (18 November 1965 – 27 May 2025) was an Indonesian actress, swimmer, songwriter and singer.

== Life and career ==
Irianti was born on 18 November 1965. Her father was Raden Ahem Erningpraja, Minister of Manpower in the Sukarno government. She began swimming as a child, winning medals from various swimming championships both national and world age groups as well as in larger-scale championships such as PON IX, SEA Games and the 1977 and 1978 Asian Games. At the end of Junior High School, she suffered from sinusitis and was forced to quit her career in swimming.

She then shifted her focus to singing and songwriting, with notable songs in the 1990s including "Ada Kamu" ("I See You") and "Kasih" ("Hear Me Out").

Irianti died on 27 May 2025, at the age of 59.
