= Edgardo Pagarigan =

Filipino cyclist

Personal information
- Born: July 11, 1958 (age 68)
- Height: 163 cm (5 ft 4 in)
- Weight: 57 kg (126 lb)

Cycling career
- Sport: Cycling

Edgardo Pagarigan (born July 11, 1958) is a Filipino former cyclist.

He competed in the points race event at the 1984 Summer Olympics.
