= Jairulla Jaitulla =

Filipino swimmer (born 1953)

Personal information
- Born: 4 December 1953 (age 72)

Sport
- Sport: Swimming
Medal record
Representing Philippines
Asian Games
Silver medal – second place	1970 Bangkok	4x100m freestyle relay
Silver medal – second place	1970 Bangkok	4x100m medley relay
Bronze medal – third place	1970 Bangkok	200m freestyle
Bronze medal – third place	1974 Tehran	200m individual medley
Bronze medal – third place	1974 Tehran	4x100m medley relay
Bronze medal – third place	1978 Bangkok	4x200m freestyle relay
SEA Games
Gold medal – first place	1977 Kuala Lumpur	100m breaststroke
Silver medal – second place	1977 Kuala Lumpur	200m breaststroke
Silver medal – second place	1977 Kuala Lumpur	4x200m freestyle relay
Bronze medal – third place	1977 Kuala Lumpur	200m freestyle
Bronze medal – third place	1977 Kuala Lumpur	400m individual medley

Jairulla Jaitulla (born 4 December 1953) is a Filipino former swimmer. He competed at the 1972 Summer Olympics and the 1984 Summer Olympics.
