= 1979 SEA Games =

Multi-sport event in Jakarta, Indonesia

10th Southeast Asian Games
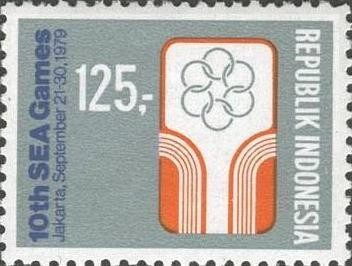
- Host city: Jakarta, Indonesia
- Nations: 7
- Sport: 16
- Opening: 21 September 1979
- Closing: 30 September 1979
- Opened by: Soeharto; President of Indonesia
- Closed by: Adam Malik; Vice President of Indonesia
- Torch lighter: Rudy Hartono; Carolina Rieuwpassa
- Ceremony venue: Gelora Senayan Stadium

The 1979 Southeast Asian Games (Indonesian: Pesta Olahraga Asia Tenggara 1979), officially known as the 10th Southeast Asian Games, were a subcontinental multi-sport event held in Jakarta, Indonesia from 21 to 30 September 1979. This was the first time that Indonesia hosted the games. Indonesia is the fifth nation to host the Southeast Asian Games after Thailand, Burma, Malaysia and Singapore. The games was officially opened and closed by President Soeharto at the Senayan Sports Stadium. The final medal tally was led by host Indonesia, followed by Thailand and Burma.

== The games ==
=== Participating nations ===
Brunei was a British colony at that time.

- Burma
- Brunei
- Indonesia (Host)
- Malaysia
- Philippines
- Singapore
- Thailand

=== Sports ===
- Aquatics
- Archery
- Athletics
- Badminton
- Basketball
- Boxing
- Cycling
- Football
- Gymnastics
- Hockey
- Judo
- Sepak takraw
- Shooting
- Softball
- Table tennis
- Tennis
- Volleyball
- Weightlifting

=== Medal table ===
Key

* Host nation (Indonesia)

| Rank | Nation | Gold | Silver | Bronze | Total |
|---|---|---|---|---|---|
| 1 | Indonesia (INA)* | 92 | 78 | 52 | 222 |
| 2 | Thailand (THA) | 50 | 46 | 29 | 125 |
| 3 | Burma (BIR) | 26 | 26 | 24 | 76 |
| 4 | Philippines (PHI) | 24 | 31 | 38 | 93 |
| 5 | Malaysia (MAS) | 19 | 23 | 39 | 81 |
| 6 | Singapore (SIN) | 16 | 20 | 36 | 72 |
| 7 | Brunei (BRU) | 0 | 1 | 0 | 1 |
| Totals (7 entries) | | 227 | 225 | 218 | 670 |

| Preceded by Kuala Lumpur | Southeast Asian Games; Jakarta; X Southeast Asian Games (1979) | Succeeded by Manila |
