= 1977 SEA Games =

Multi-sport event in Kuala Lumpur, Malaysia

9th Southeast Asian Games
- Host city: Kuala Lumpur, Malaysia
- Nations: 7
- Debuting countries: Indonesia, Philippines, Brunei
- Sport: 18
- Opening: 19 November 1977
- Closing: 26 November 1977
- Opened by: Yahya Petra of Kelantan; Yang di-Pertuan Agong
- Torch lighter: Junaidah Aman; Wong Choon Wah
- Ceremony venue: Stadium Merdeka

The 1977 Southeast Asian Games (Malay: Sukan Asia Tenggara 1977), officially known as the 9th Southeast Asian Games, were a Southeast Asian multi-sport event held in Kuala Lumpur, Malaysia from 19 to 26 November 1977. This was the third time Malaysia hosted the games and its first since 1971. Previously, it also hosted the games for the first time in 1965.

Brunei, Indonesia, and the Philippines were finally admitted into the SEAP Games Federation in February that year and competed for their first time. Although the word 'Peninsula' was omitted from the new federation title to reflect the expansion, in which the games is the first games to bear the name, its emblem (which featured six rings representing the six founding members), and the sequential numbering of the games was kept to provide continuity, as well as reverence to the objectives, aspirations and contributions of the founders. The six-ring emblem was not replaced until 1999, when the present ten-ring emblem was first used in an official games logo. The games was opened and closed by Yahya Petra, the King of Malaysia at the Stadium Merdeka. The final medal tally was led by Indonesia, followed by Thailand and the Philippines, with host Malaysia in fifth place.

== The games ==
=== Participating nations ===
Brunei was a British protectorate at that time. The Bold Lines means the Nation makes its debut appearance from the games.

- Burma
- Brunei
- Indonesia
- Malaysia (Host)
- Philippines
- Singapore
- Thailand

=== Sports ===
- Aquatics
- Archery
- Athletics
- Badminton
- Basketball
- Boxing
- Bowling
- Cycling
- Football
- Hockey
- Judo
- Rugby union
- Sepak takraw
- Shooting
- Table tennis
- Tennis
- Volleyball
- Weightlifting

=== Medal table ===
Key

* Host nation (Malaysia)

Rank	Nation	Gold	Silver	Bronze	Total
1	Indonesia (INA)	62	41	34	137
2	Thailand (THA)	37	35	33	105
3	Philippines (PHI)	31	30	30	91
4	Burma (BIR)	25	42	43	110
5	Malaysia (MAS)*	21	17	21	59
6	Singapore (SIN)	14	21	28	63
7	Brunei (BRU)	0	0	3	3
Totals (7 entries)		190	186	192	568

Preceded by Bangkok	Southeast Asian Games; Kuala Lumpur; IX Southeast Asian Games (1977)	Succeeded by Jakarta
