= 1981 SEA Games =

Multi-sport event in Manila, Philippines

11th Southeast Asian Games
- Host city: Manila, Philippines
- Nations: 7
- Sport: 18
- Opening: 6 December 1981
- Closing: 15 December 1981
- Opened by: Ferdinand Marcos; President of the Philippines
- Torch lighter: Benjamin Silva-Netto
- Ceremony venue: Rizal Memorial Stadium

The 1981 Southeast Asian Games, officially known as the 11th Southeast Asian Games, were a multi-sport event held in Manila, Philippines from 6 to 15 December 1981. This was the first time that the Philippines hosted the Games since its first participation in 1977, and by that, the Philippines became the sixth nation to host the SEA Games after Thailand, Burma, Malaysia, Singapore and Indonesia.

More than 2,200 athletes and officials had participated in the Manila SEA Games. The event was officially opened by President Ferdinand Marcos, and the cauldron was lit by Benjamin Silva-Netto. The colourful opening ceremony was held in the Rizal Memorial Stadium.

A new football stadium and indoor arena was built in Pasig named the University of Life Track & Field and Arena or the ULTRA, now called the PhilSports Complex. The adjacent apartments were used as the athlete's quarters and was converted into a BLISS housing project of First Lady Imelda Marcos. The final medal tally was led by Indonesia, followed by Thailand and hosts Philippines.

== The games ==
=== Participating nations ===
Brunei was a British colony at that time

- Burma
- Brunei
- Indonesia
- Malaysia
- Philippines (Host)
- Singapore
- Thailand

=== Sports ===
- Aquatics
- Archery
- Athletics
- Badminton
- Basketball
- Bowling
- Boxing
- Cycling
- Football
- Gymnastics
- Judo
- Sepak takraw
- Shooting
- Softball
- Table tennis
- Tennis
- Volleyball
- Weightlifting

=== Medal table ===
Key

* Host nation (Philippines)

Rank	Nation	Gold	Silver	Bronze	Total
1	Indonesia (INA)	85	73	56	214
2	Thailand (THA)	62	45	41	148
3	Philippines (PHI)*	55	55	77	187
4	Malaysia (MAS)	16	27	31	74
5	Burma (BIR)	15	19	27	61
6	Singapore (SIN)	12	26	33	71
7	Brunei (BRU)	0	0	0	0
Totals (7 entries)		245	245	265	755

Preceded by Jakarta	Southeast Asian Games; Manila; XI Southeast Asian Games (1981)	Succeeded by Singapore
