= List of Padma Shri award recipients (1980–1989) =

Recipients of a civilian award in India

Padma Shri
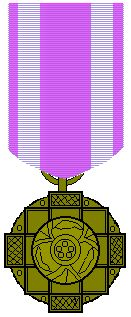
- Type: National Civilian
- Country: India
- Presented by: Government of India
- Ribbon
- Obverse: A centrally located lotus flower is embossed and the text "Padma" written in Devanagari script is placed above and the text "Shri" is placed below the lotus.
- Reverse: A platinum State Emblem of India placed in the centre with the national motto of India, "Satyameva Jayate" (Truth alone triumphs) in Devanagari Script
- Established: 1954
- First award: 1954

Highlights
- Total: 326

Precedence
- Next (higher): Padma Bhushan

Padma Shri Award, India's fourth highest civilian honours, Winners, 1980-1989:

== Recipients ==
Award recipients by year
Year	Number of recipients
1980	0
1981	27
1982	31
1983	53
1984	55
1985	44
1986	30
1987	32
1988	27
1989	27

Award recipients by field
Field	Number of recipients
Arts	73
Civil Service	45
Literature & Education	57
Medicine	47
Others	1
Public Affairs	1
Science & Engineering	24
Social Work	43
Sports	30
Trade & Industry	5

Key
# Indicates a posthumous honour

List of Padma Shri award recipients
Year	Recipient	Field	State/ Country
1981	Chubalemla AO	Social Work	Nagaland
1981	Jasbir Singh Bajaj	Medicine	Delhi
1981	Vasudevan Baskaran	Sports	Tamil Nadu
1981	Krishan Dutta Bharadwaj	Literature & Education	Delhi
1981	Sita Devi	Arts	Delhi
1981	Madhav Gadgil	Civil Service	Karnataka
1981	Hari Krishan Jain	Science & Engineering	Delhi
1981	Mohamed Zainuddin Juvale	Civil Service	Maharashtra
1981	Gurcharan Singh Kalkat	Science & Engineering	United States
1981	B. V. Karanth	Arts	Karnataka
1981	Dinkar Gangadhar Kelkar	Science & Engineering	Maharashtra
1981	Abid Ali Khan	Literature & Education	Andhra Pradesh
1981	Namagiripettai Krishnan	Arts	Tamil Nadu
1981	Gambhir Singh Mura	Arts	West Bengal
1981	Kunwar Singh Negi	Social Work	Uttarakhand
1981	Sita Ram Pal	Social Work	Uttar Pradesh
1981	Bakulaben Mohphai Patel	Medicine	Gujarat
1981	Dashrath Patel	Arts	Gujarat
1981	Ram Punjwani	Literature & Education	Maharashtra
1981	S. H. Raza	Arts	France
1981	Vishwanath Hari Salaskar	Social Work	Maharashtra
1981	P. K. Sethi	Medicine	Rajasthan
1981	Bhagat Puran Singh	Social Work	Punjab
1981	Dhanwant Singh	Medicine	Punjab
1981	Padma Subrahmanyam	Arts	Tamil Nadu
1981	K. Vardachari Thiruvengadam	Medicine	Tamil Nadu
1981	Claire Vellut	Social Work	Tamil Nadu
1982	Niranjan Das Aggarwal	Medicine	Punjab
1982	Kalim Ajiz	Literature & Education	Bihar
1982	Allah Jilai Bai	Arts	Rajasthan
1982	Vaikom Muhammad Basheer	Literature & Education	Kerala
1982	Ammannur Madhava Chakyar	Arts	Kerala
1982	Madhav Kashinath Dalvi	Forestry	Gujarat
1982	Ghanshyam Das	Social Work	Assam
1982	Narpati Datta	Civil Service	Maharashtra
1982	Swami Kalyandev	Social Work	Uttar Pradesh
1982	Francis Leslie Fraser	Science & Engineering	Uttarakhand
1982	Krishnaswamy Kasturirangan	Science & Engineering	Karnataka
1982	Syed Kirmani	Sports	Karnataka
1982	Prem Chandra Luthar	Civil Service	Delhi
1982	Kapil Dev	Sports	Chandigarh
1982	Prakash Padukone	Sports	Karnataka
1982	R. V. Pandit	Literature & Education	Germany
1982	E. Srinivasan Parthasarthy	Civil Service	Tamil Nadu
1982	Jabbar Patel	Arts	Maharashtra
1982	Virendra Prabhakar	Arts	Delhi
1982	Satya Prakash	Science & Engineering	Gujarat
1982	V. Narayana Rao	Science & Engineering	Karnataka
1982	Gopal Krishna Saraf	Medicine	West Bengal
1982	Sher Singh Sher	Literature & Education	Chandigarh
1982	Gaura Pant Shivani	Literature & Education	Uttar Pradesh
1982	C. P. Thakur	Medicine	Bihar
1982	Shiv Dutt Upadhyaya	Social Work	Delhi
1982	Gautam Vaghela	Arts	Maharashtra
1982	Ramaswamy M. Vasagam	Science & Engineering	Kerala
1982	Palligarnai Thirumalai Venugopal	Civil Service	United States
1982	Rajendra Tansukh Vyas	Social Work	Maharashtra
1982	Raj Vir Singh Yadav	Medicine	Chandigarh
1983	Vijay Amritraj	Sports	Tamil Nadu
1983	S. S. Badrinath	Medicine	Tamil Nadu
1983	Kanwaljit Singh Bains	Civil Service	Uttar Pradesh
1983	Raj Baveja	Medicine	Uttar Pradesh
1983	Dada Shewak Bhojraj	Social Work	Maharashtra
1983	Prakash Chandra	Medicine	Delhi
1983	Ahalya Chari	Literature & Education	Tamil Nadu
1983	Amitabha Chaudhuri	Literature & Education	West Bengal
1983	Addepalli Sarvi Chetty	Social Work	Andhra Pradesh
1983	Saroj Raj Choudhury	Science & Engineering	Odisha
1983	Bahadur Singh Chouhan	Sports	Jharkhand
1983	Pamela Cullen	Arts	United Kingdom
1983	R. Ganapati	Medicine	Maharashtra
1983	Sirkazhi Govindarajan	Arts	Tamil Nadu
1983	Guru Hanuman	Sports	Delhi
1983	Saliha Abid Hussain	Literature & Education	Delhi
1983	Chhattra Pati Joshi	Civil Service	Delhi
1983	Harkrishan Lal Kapur	Civil Service	Delhi
1983	Dara Kaikhushroo Karanjavala	Medicine	Maharashtra
1983	Gulam Rusull Khan	Civil Service	Jammu & Kashmir
1983	Sharafat Hussain Khan	Arts	Uttar Pradesh
1983	Komal Kothari	Literature & Education	Rajasthan
1983	Nepal Mahato	Arts	West Bengal
1983	Hundraj Lila Ram Dukhayal Manik	Literature & Education	Gujarat
1983	Handel Manuel	Arts	Tamil Nadu
1983	Raghuvir Sharan Mitra	Literature & Education	Uttar Pradesh
1983	M. P. Nachimuthu	Social Work	Tamil Nadu
1983	Eliza Nelson	Sports	Maharashtra
1983	K. V. S. J. Peter	Civil Service	Tamil Nadu
1983	Raghu Raj	Civil Service	Uttar Pradesh
1983	Chand Ram	Sports	Haryana
1983	Shishupal Ram	Medicine	Bihar
1983	Sidhu Randhawa	Arts	Punjab
1983	Narla Tata Rao	Civil Service	Andhra Pradesh
1983	Dharam Veer Sachdeva	Medicine	Delhi
1983	Anselm Sawihlira	Civil Service	Mizoram
1983	Ghulam Mohammed Sheikh	Arts	Gujarat
1983	Hassan Nasiem Siddiquie	Science & Engineering	Goa
1983	Attar Singh	Literature & Education	Chandigarh
1983	Kaur Singh	Sports	Punjab
1983	Liarenmayum Damu Singh	Sports	Manipur
1983	Raghubir Singh	Sports	Rajasthan
1983	Raghubir Singh	Arts	France
1983	Sardar Sohan Singh	Arts	Punjab
1983	Satpal Singh	Sports	Delhi
1983	Sobha Singh	Arts	Haryana
1983	Habib Tanvir	Arts	Delhi
1983	Jivanlal Moti Lal Thakore	Civil Service	Gujarat
1983	Narain Singh Thapa	Arts	Maharashtra
1983	M. D. Valsamma	Sports	Kerala
1983	Purshottam Lal Wahi	Medicine	Chandigarh
1983	Nekibuz Zaman	Medicine	Assam
1983	Geeta Zutshi	Sports	Haryana
1984	Ganga Devi	Arts	Bihar
1984	Mohammad Hamid Ansari	Civil Service	Delhi
1984	Mayangnokcha Ao	Literature & Education	Nagaland
1984	Amitabh Bachchan	Arts	Maharashtra
1984	Charles Borromeo	Sports	Bihar
1984	Kshem Suman Chandra	Literature & Education	Delhi
1984	Lakshmi Kumari Chundawat	Literature & Education	Rajasthan
1984	Maria Renee Cura	Science & Engineering	Argentina
1984	Purshottam Das	Arts	Rajasthan
1984	Prem Nath Dhawan	Social Work	Tamil Nadu
1984	Phu Dorjee	Sports	Sikkim
1984	Shanta Gandhi	Literature & Education	Maharashtra
1984	Mukti Prasad Gogoi	Medicine	Assam
1984	Adoor Gopalakrishnan	Arts	Kerala
1984	Chuni Goswami	Sports	West Bengal
1984	Vasant Gowarikar	Science & Engineering	Maharashtra
1984	B. K. Goyal	Medicine	Maharashtra
1984	Sadhu Singh Hamdard	Literature & Education	Punjab
1984	Vera Hingorani	Medicine	Delhi
1984	Qurratulain Hyder	Literature & Education	Uttar Pradesh
1984	Ganpatrao Jadhav	Literature & Education	Maharashtra
1984	Satya Pal Jagota	Civil Service	Canada
1984	Basantibala Jena	Medicine	Odisha
1984	Pramod Kale	Science & Engineering	Gujarat
1984	Bhupen Khakhar	Arts	Gujarat
1984	Mohmmed Khalilullah	Medicine	Delhi
1984	D. K. Khullar	Sports	Punjab
1984	Ben Kingsley	Arts	United Kingdom
1984	Syed Abdul Malik	Literature & Education	Assam
1984	John Arthur King Martyn	Literature & Education	Uttarakhand
1984	K. P. Mathur	Medicine	Delhi
1984	Vinay Chandra Maudgalya	Arts	Delhi
1984	Roshan Kumari	Arts	Maharashtra
1984	Deori Omem Moyong	Social Work	Delhi
1984	Mavelikara Krishnankutty Nair	Arts	Kerala
1984	N. Balakrishnan Nair	Medicine	Kerala
1984	K. Narayanan	Science & Engineering	Gujarat
1984	Bachendri Pal	Sports	Uttar Pradesh
1984	Awadhesh Prasad Pandey	Medicine	Andhra Pradesh
1984	Nilamber Pant	Science & Engineering	Karnataka
1984	Dharamchand Patni	Social Work	Manipur
1984	Sooranad Kunjan Pillai	Literature & Education	Kerala
1984	N. Rajam	Arts	Uttar Pradesh
1984	Zainulabedin Gulam Husain Rangoonwala	Social Work	Maharashtra
1984	Myneni Hariprasada Rao	Science & Engineering	Maharashtra
1984	Radha Reddy	Arts	Delhi
1984	Raja Reddy	Arts	Delhi
1984	Nek Chand Saini	Arts	Chandigarh
1984	Syed Nasaar Ahmed Shah	Medicine	Jammu & Kashmir
1984	Hariharan Srinivasan	Medicine	Tamil Nadu
1984	M. R. Srinivasan	Science & Engineering	Maharashtra
1984	Krishna Murari Tiwari	Social Forestry	Uttar Pradesh
1984	Ram Gopal Vijayvargiya	Arts	Rajasthan
1984	Hari Krishan Wattal	Civil Service	Uttar Pradesh
1984	Jai Singh Pal Yadav	Civil Service	Delhi
1985	Om Agarwal	Sports	West Bengal
1985	Syed Hasan Askari	Literature & Education	Bihar
1985	Krishan Dev Bali	Civil Service	Delhi
1985	Jai Rattan Bhalla	Science & Engineering	Delhi
1985	Som Nath Bhaskar	Civil Service	Karnataka
1985	Ela Bhatt	Social Work	Gujarat
1985	Elizabeth Brunner	Arts	Delhi
1985	Arvind Navranglal Buch	Social Work	Gujarat
1985	Biswas Ranjan Chatterjee	Medicine	West Bengal
1985	Shanti Dave	Arts	Gujarat
1985	James Dokhuma	Literature & Education	Mizoram
1985	Ramniklal K. Gandhi	Medicine	Maharashtra
1985	Kaka Hathrasi	Literature & Education	Uttar Pradesh
1985	Harbans Singh Jolly	Civil Service	Delhi
1985	Satish Chandra Kala	Civil Service	Uttar Pradesh
1985	Dinamani Sridhar Kamat	Civil Service	Uttarakhand
1985	Predhiman Krishan Kaw	Science & Engineering	Gujarat
1985	Namagundlu Venkata Krishnamurthy	Civil Service	Maharashtra
1985	Ratnappa Kumbhar	Social Work	Maharashtra
1985	Erasmus Lyngdoh	Civil Service	Meghalaya
1985	Asa Singh Mastana	Arts	Delhi
1985	Shital Raj Mehta	Medicine	Rajasthan
1985	Bharat Mishra	Literature & Education	Bihar
1985	Chandra Mohan	Civil Service	Chandigarh
1985	Madan Mohan	Medicine	Delhi
1985	Bhagwat Murmu	Social Work	Bihar
1985	Samiran Nundy	Medicine	Delhi
1985	Laxman Pai	Arts	Goa
1985	Harishankar Parsai	Literature & Education	Madhya Pradesh
1985	Smita Patil	Arts	Maharashtra
1985	S. V. S. Raghavan	Civil Service	Delhi
1985	Palghat R. Raghu	Arts	Tamil Nadu
1985	Nelly Sethna	Trade & Industry	Maharashtra
1985	Naseeruddin Shah	Arts	Maharashtra
1985	Usha Sharma	Medicine	Uttar Pradesh
1985	Ashangbam Minaketan Singh	Literature & Education	Manipur
1985	Jasdev Singh	Civil Service	Delhi
1985	S. Srinivasa Sriramacharyulu	Medicine	Delhi
1985	Jadunath Supakar	Trade & Industry	Uttar Pradesh
1985	Haridas Thongram	Social Work	Manipur
1985	P. T. Usha	Sports	Kerala
1985	M. S. Valiathan	Medicine	Kerala
1985	Gopal Krishna Vishwakarma	Medicine	Delhi
1985	Anutai Wagh	Social Work	Maharashtra
1986	Anil Agarwal	Literature & Education	Delhi
1986	Gokuldas Shivaldas Ahuja	Civil Service	Maharashtra
1986	Shankar Bapu Apegaonkar	Arts	Maharashtra
1986	Kanika Banerjee	Arts	West Bengal
1986	Chandi Prasad Bhatt	Social Work	Uttarakhand
1986	Mahasweta Devi	Social Work	West Bengal
1986	Krishan Dev Dewan	Social Work	Bihar
1986	Anupama Gokhale	Sports	Maharashtra
1986	Govind Bhimachary Joshi	Others	Karnataka
1986	Santosh Kumar Kacker	Medicine	Delhi
1986	Tushar Kanjilal	Social Work	West Bengal
1986	Binod Kanungo	Literature & Education	Odisha
1986	Avdhash Kaushal	Social Work	Uttarakhand
1986	Anil Kumar Lakhina	Civil Service	Maharashtra
1986	Narayan Singh Manaklao	Social Work	Rajasthan
1986	Subrata Mitra	Arts	West Bengal
1986	Chitra Naik	Literature & Education	Maharashtra
1986	Sheik Nazar	Arts	Andhra Pradesh
1986	Abdur Rahman	Literature & Education	Delhi
1986	Swaroop Kishen Reu	Sports	Delhi
1986	Nuchhungi Renthlei	Literature & Education	Mizoram
1986	Bunker Roy	Social Work	Delhi
1986	Geet Sethi	Sports	Gujarat
1986	Mohammad Shahid	Sports	Uttar Pradesh
1986	V. Shanta	Medicine	Tamil Nadu
1986	Raghunath Sharma	Literature & Education	Uttar Pradesh
1986	Rajkumar Singhajit Singh	Arts	Delhi
1986	Ramesh Inder Singh	Civil Service	Delhi
1986	Somasundaram Subramanian	Civil Service	Delhi
1986	Hisam-ud-din Usta	Arts	Rajasthan
1987	Abdul Sattar	Literature & Education	Assam
1987	Nazir Ahmed	Literature & Education	Uttar Pradesh
1987	Mohammad Izhar Alam	Civil Service	Bihar
1987	Begum Zaffar Ali	Social Work	Jammu & Kashmir
1987	Jaya Arunachalam	Social Work	Tamil Nadu
1987	K. Balachander	Arts	Tamil Nadu
1987	Joginder Paul Birdi	Civil Service	Punjab
1987	Hormazdiar Jamshedi Muncherji Desai	Social Work	Maharashtra
1987	Saroj Kumar Gupta	Medicine	West Bengal
1987	Hrangaia	Social Work	Mizoram
1987	Vanaja Iyengar	Literature & Education	Andhra Pradesh
1987	Gurbachan Jagat	Civil Service	Delhi
1987	Prem Kumar Kakar	Medicine	Delhi
1987	Khawlkungi	Literature & Education	Mizoram
1987	Kumudini Lakhia	Arts	Gujarat
1987	Vijaya Mehta	Arts	Maharashtra
1987	Badri Narayan	Literature & Education	Maharashtra
1987	Prabhu Dayal Nigam	Medicine	Delhi
1987	Debi Prasanna Pattanayak	Literature & Education	Odisha
1987	Natesan Ramani	Arts	Tamil Nadu
1987	P. V. S. Rao	Science & Engineering	Maharashtra
1987	Bhagyashree Thipsay	Sports	Maharashtra
1987	Sant Singh Sekhon	Literature & Education	Punjab
1987	Aparna Sen	Arts	West Bengal
1987	Amar Nath Shastri	Medicine	Chandigarh
1987	Ramadas P. Shenoy	Science & Engineering	Karnataka
1987	Daljit Singh	Medicine	Punjab
1987	Kartar Singh	Civil Service	Punjab
1987	N. Khelchandra Singh	Literature & Education	Manipur
1987	Naresh Sohal	Arts	United Kingdom
1987	Dilip Vengsarkar	Sports	Maharashtra
1987	Harbans Singh Wasir	Medicine	Delhi
1988	Jitendra Abhisheki	Arts	Maharashtra
1988	Viswanathan Anand	Sports	Tamil Nadu
1988	Mohammad Azharuddin	Sports	Andhra Pradesh
1988	Shabana Azmi	Arts	Maharashtra
1988	Teejan Bai	Arts	Madhya Pradesh
1988	Bikash Bhattacharjee	Arts	West Bengal
1988	Madaram Brahma	Literature & Education	Assam
1988	Avinder Singh Brar	Civil Service	Punjab
1988	Jadeng Buana	Social Work	Mizoram
1988	Valmiki Choudhary	Public Affairs	Delhi
1988	Nissim Ezekiel	Literature & Education	Maharashtra
1988	K. M. George	Literature & Education	Kerala
1988	Zakir Hussain	Arts	United States
1988	Chaman Lal	Civil Service	Delhi
1988	Chindodi Leela	Arts	Karnataka
1988	Mario Miranda	Literature & Education	Maharashtra
1988	Vidya Niwas Mishra	Literature & Education	Uttar Pradesh
1988	Vithalbhai Chhotabhai Patel	Medicine	Gujarat
1988	Sudharani Raghupathy	Arts	Tamil Nadu
1988	Ramanatha Venkata Ramani	Science & Engineering	Tamil Nadu
1988	Shivanarayan Motilal Rathi	Trade & Industry	Maharashtra
1988	Sudarshan Sahoo	Arts	Odisha
1988	Kudrat Singh	Arts	Rajasthan
1988	Umayalpuram K. Sivaraman	Arts	Tamil Nadu
1988	Sarbdeep Singh Virk	Civil Service	Punjab
1988	Darshan Singh Vohra	Social Work	Chandigarh
1988	Ali Jawad Zaidi	Literature & Education	Uttar Pradesh
1989	Kalim Ajiz	Literature & Education	Bihar
1989	Mithu Alur	Social Work	Maharashtra
1989	Vedaratnam Appakutti	Social Work	Tamil Nadu
1989	Barsane Lal Chaturvedi	Literature & Education	Delhi
1989	Anita Desai	Literature & Education	Delhi
1989	Rajmohini Devi	Social Work	Madhya Pradesh
1989	Saroj Ghose	Science & Engineering	West Bengal
1989	Kanwar Pal Singh Gill	Civil Service	Chandigarh
1989	Krishnammal Jagannathan	Social Work	Tamil Nadu
1989	Mag Raj Jain	Social Work	Rajasthan
1989	Edward Kutchat	Social Work	Andaman and Nicobar Islands
1989	Adyar K. Lakshman	Arts	Tamil Nadu
1989	Nima Namgyal Lama	Civil Service	West Bengal
1989	Shiv Raj Kumar Malik	Medicine	Delhi
1989	Ved Marwah	Civil Service	Delhi
1989	Kiran Mazumdar	Trade & Industry	Karnataka
1989	Lila Poonawalla	Trade & Industry	Maharashtra
1989	Palle Rama Rao	Science & Engineering	Andhra Pradesh
1989	Moti Lal Saqi	Literature & Education	Jammu & Kashmir
1989	Haku Shah	Arts	Gujarat
1989	Shamsuddin Sheikh	Arts	Uttar Pradesh
1989	Sarabjit Singh	Civil Service	Punjab
1989	L. Subramaniam	Arts	Tamil Nadu
1989	Rongbong Terang	Literature & Education	Assam
1989	Ratan Thiyam	Arts	Manipur
1989	Upendra Trivedi	Arts	Gujarat
1989	V. Venkatachalam	Literature & Education	Uttar Pradesh
