= Kudrat Singh =

Kudrat Singh Meenakar
- Master Craftsman Jaipur
- Born: 24 April 1924; Jaipur, Rajasthan, India
- Died: 21 March 2002 (aged 77); In airplane on board, while coming back to India from Germany,.
- Spouse: Trilochan Devi Ji
- Father: Master Rawal Singh Craft Teacher at Maharaja School of Art and Crafts
- Mother: Kalawati

Kudrat Singh Meenakar (24 April 1924 – 21 March 2002) was an Indian jeweller who specialised in kundan meenakari. An artisan of Jaipur he was also known as Swarnkar, or Sunar.

== Early life and education ==
He received training by his father under Guru Shishya Parampara, India have long tradition of Guru-shishya tradition, where skills are passed on father to son or by other relatives belonging to the same family or the same community, training the child while grooming. Kudrat Singh later went to go study at Rajasthan School of Art and Crafts, Jaipur under the new British education system at Jaipur.

== Family history ==
His forefather was the founder of Meenakari craft at Jaipur; also his forefather was given the royal patronage by the Kacchwaha King of Amber, and Dhundhar Man Singh I, the rulers of Amber – Jaipur were efficient administrators. As administrators, they served sincerely under different Mughal emperors and were acknowledged and rewarded.

== Forefather of Kudrat Singh ==
During the 16th century his forefather was brought to Jaipore city which is now known as Jaipur city as capital of Rajasthan State, by the Kacchwaha King of Amber and Dhundhar Raja Man Singh I.

Kacchwaha King were even deputed as "Subedars" in different parts of North-West frontier and helped the emperors in running the administration smoothly. During this time, Kudrat Singh forefather brought to Jaipore and Amber which is now known as Jaipur city as capital of Rajasthan State, from somewhere near to Lahore city situated in west Punjab,.

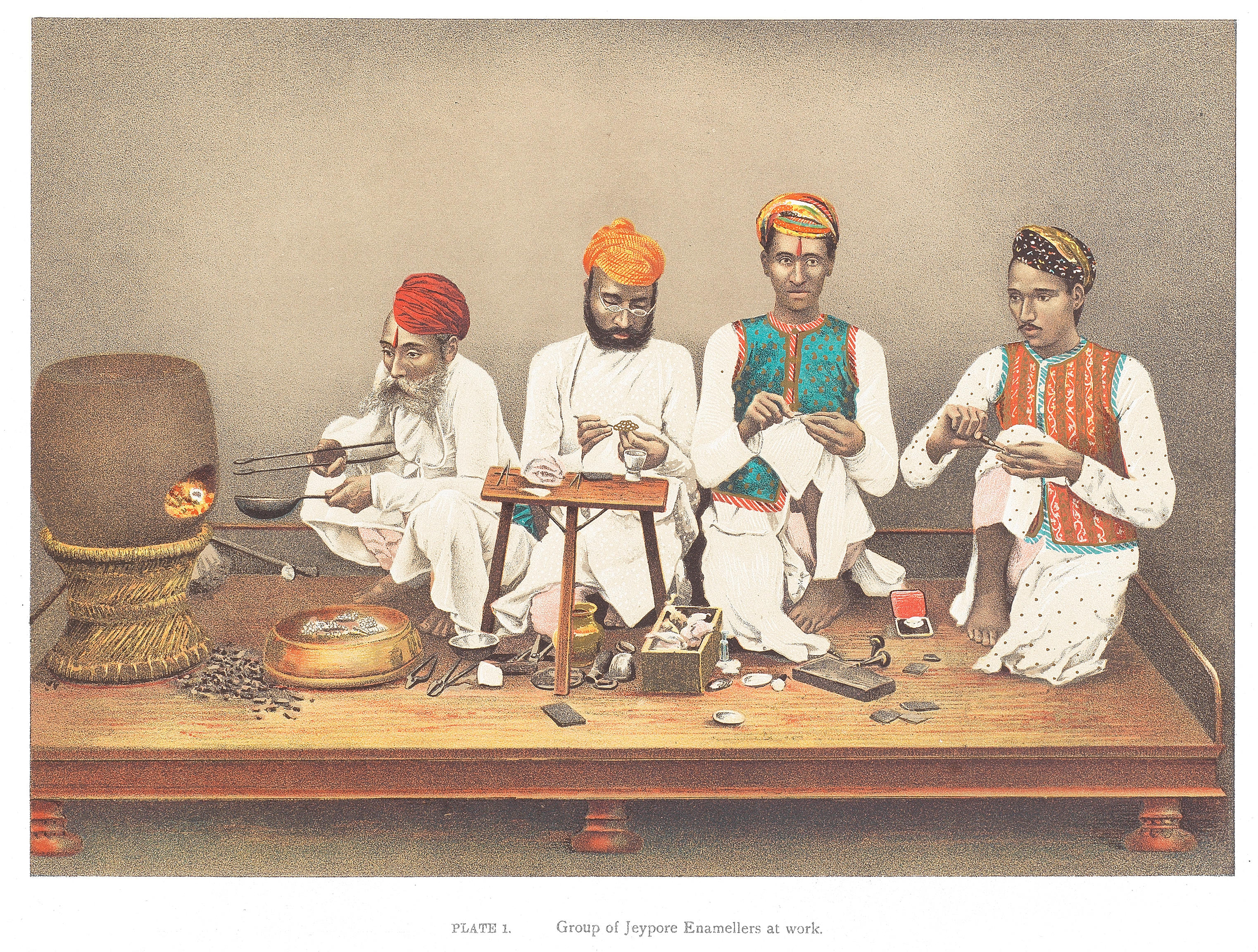
Forefather of Kudrat Singh, workshop (karkhana)

== Familiar tradition ==
=== Children of Kudrat Singh ===
Inder Singh Kudrat, National Award of master craft person he also continuing the family tradition and also doing this traditional work GULAB SINGH son of Kudrat Singh.

== Honours ==
- Padma Shri
- National Award

== Internationally recognized ==
- He was awarded with National Award of master craft person by Government of India in 1965.
- He was awarded the Padma Shrias master craft person by Government of India in 1988.
