= Inder Singh Kudrat =

Inder Singh Kudrat Meenakar
- Master Craftsman Jaipur
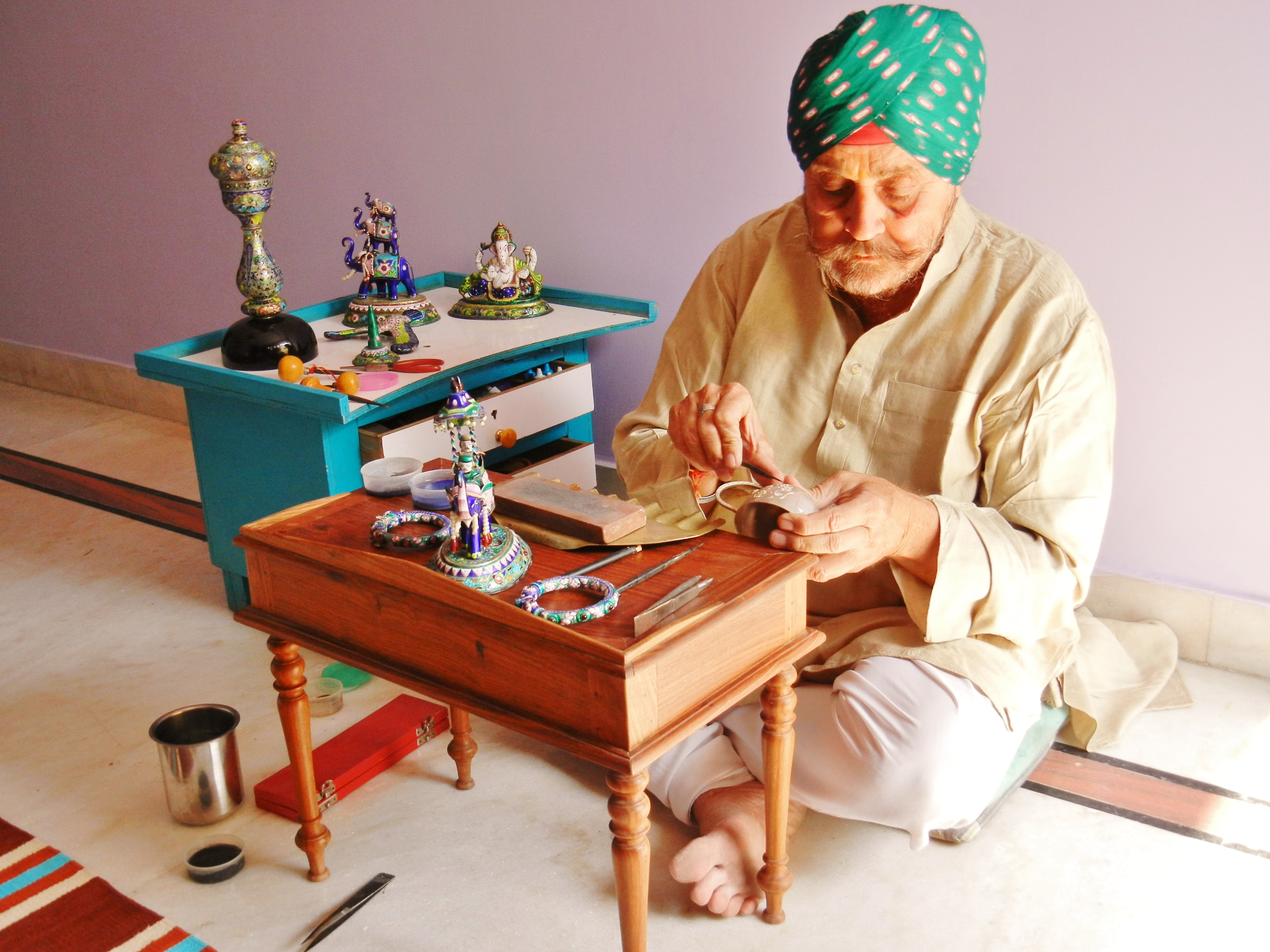
- Born: 24 August 1950; Jaipur, Rajasthan, India
- Spouse: Parmeshwari
- Father: Padma Shri Kudrat Singh Meenakar
- Mother: Trilochan Devi Ji
- Religion: Hinduism and Sikhism

Inder Singh Kudrat (Hindi: इंदर सिंह कुदरत) is an Indian jeweller and Master Craftsman who specialised in kundan meenakari. An artisan of Jaipur he was also known as Swarnkar, or Sunar.

== Early life and education ==
He received training by his father under GURU SHISHYA PARAMPARA, India have long tradition of Guru-shishya tradition, where skills is passed on father to son or by other relatives belonging to the same family or the same community, training the child while grooming, as family tradition. Kudrat singh later went to go study at Rajasthan School of Art and Crafts, Jaipur under the new British education system at Jaipur. He has won numerous awards, both national as well as international awards. In 2009 he was one of the awardees for the Indian National Award for Handicrafts.

== Family origin ==
His family has origin as Sikh family of Meenakari craft belonging caste of Mair rajput.

== Family history ==
His forefather was the founder of Meenakari craft at Jaipur also his forefather was given the royal patronage by the Kacchwaha King of Amber, and Dhundhar Man Singh I, the rulers of Amber – Jaipur were not only brave and courageous but also were very efficient administrators. As administrators, they served very sincerely under different Mughal emperors and were duly acknowledged and rewarded.

== Forefathers of Kudrat Singh ==
During 16th century his forefather was brought to Jaipore city which is now known as Jaipur city as capital of Rajasthan State, by the Kacchwaha King of Amber and Dhundhar Raja Man Singh I.

Kacchwaha King were even deputed as “Subedars” in different parts of North-West frontier and helped the emperors in running the administration smoothly. during this time kudrat Singh forefather brought to Jaipore and Amber which is now known as Jaipur city as capital of Rajasthan State, from somewhere near to Lahore city situated in west Punjab,.

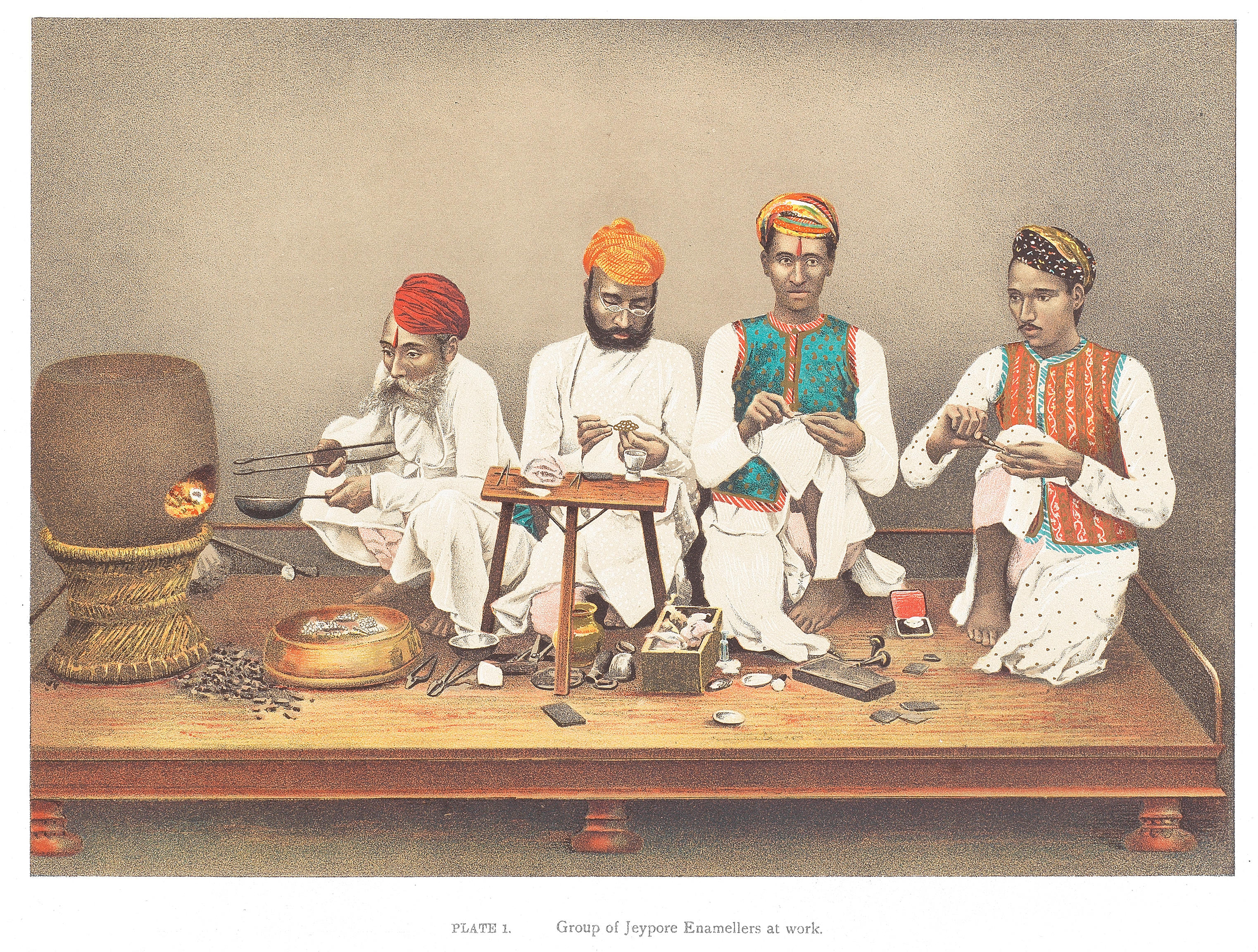
Forefather of Kudrat Singh, workshop (karkhana)
