= Siri Chand Ram =

Indian racewalker (born 1958)

Chand Ram
Personal information
- Full name: Siri Chand Ram
- Nationality: Indian
- Born: 26 January 1958 (age 68) Rajana Khurd, Jind, Haryana, India
- Height: 5 ft 10 in (1.78 m)
- Weight: 68 kg (150 lb)

Sport
- Sport: 20 kilometre road walk

Achievements and titles
- Olympic finals: 1984 Summer Olympics, LA (Participated)
Medal record
Men's athletics
Representing India
Asian Games
Gold medal – first place	1982 Delhi	20 km walk
Asian Championships
Gold medal – first place	1981 Tokyo	20 km walk
Gold medal – first place	1983 Kuwait City	20 km walk
Silver medal – second place	1985 Jakarta	20 km walk

Siri Chand Ram (born 26 January 1958) is a former Indian athlete who won gold medal at 1982 Asian Games at Delhi in 20 kilometre road walk event. He also represented India at the 1984 Olympics. He was presented the Arjuna Award and the Padma Shri.

== Awards ==
- 1982: Arjuna Award in Athletics
- 1983: Padma Shri
