= M. P. Nachimuthu =

Indian social worker

M. P. Nachimuthu Mudaliyar
- Born: Chennimalai, Tamil Nadu
- Other names: Popularly known as "MPN"
- Education: B.A. B.L.,
- Occupation: Hand Loom - co-operative movement
- Known for: Handloom Veteran - Government of India honored Padma Shri Award in 1983
- Title: "Kaiththari Kavalar" ( Savior of Handloom). " Father of Handlooms weavers" ( Nesavalarkalin Thanthai).
- Awards: Padma Shri (1983)

M. P. Nachimuthu Mudaliyar (28 March 1913 – 27 June 1987) was an Indian Padma Shri award winner in 1983 for his social work in the hand loom field. He was the founder of Chentex Hand Looms in Chennimalai.

An Engineering College is constructed in Chennimalai with his name by J. Sudhanandhen.
