= Soni (caste) =

Indian artisan caste

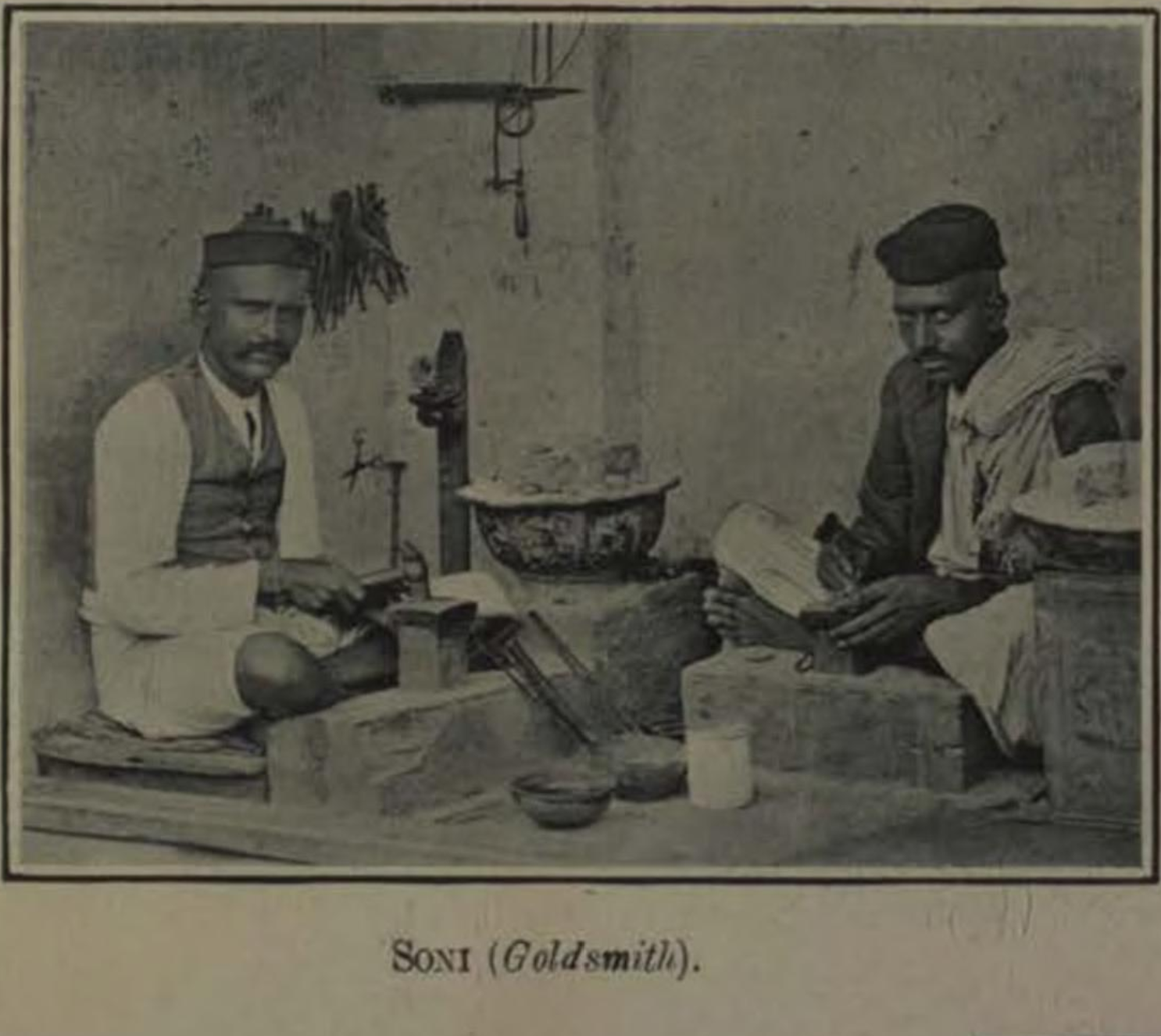
Two Soni men

The Soni are a Hindu, Sikh, Jain, and Muslim caste of goldsmiths found throughout India in the states of Punjab, Rajasthan, Gujarat, Madhya Pradesh.

== Present circumstances ==
The Soni are essentially still goldsmiths, with a few also involved in the manufacture of other items of jewellery. Historically they were under shudra caste of metal workers but because of their access to gold and trade, they also claim vaishya caste. . They follow Vaishnavism, and many belonging to the Swaminarayan sect.

== Shrimali Soni ==
This caste is mostly found in Gujarat.

== See also ==
- Sunar
