= Laser Science and Technology Centre =

Indian defense laboratory

Laser Science & Technology Centre
- Established: 1998 as LASTEC; 1982 as DSC; 1950 part of DS
- Director: Shri Hari Babu Srivastava
- Location: Melcalfe House; Delhi-110054, Delhi
- Operating agency: DRDO
- Website: LASTEC Home Page

Laser Science and Technology Centre (LASTEC) was a laboratory of the Defence Research & Development Organization (DRDO). Located in Delhi, it was the main DRDO lab involved in the development of lasers and related technologies. LASTEC functions under the DRDO Directorate of Electronics & Computer Science.

== History ==
LASTEC was the oldest laboratory in DRDO. It was established in 1950 as Defence Science Laboratory (DSL) which was a nucleus laboratory with the objective to conduct research in frontier areas of physics, chemistry and mathematics with a special focus on lasers and opto-electronics. On 9 April 1960, DSL was shifted to Metcalfe House and inaugurated by then Defence Minister V. K. Krishna Menon, in the presence of Pt. Jawaharlal Nehru. Its first Director was S. P. Chakravarti, the father of Electronics and Telecommunication engineering in India, who later founded LRDE, DRDL and DLRL.

With time, many DSC activities were given to newly formed, specialized DRDO laboratories. DSL served as a precursor for as many as 15 present DRDO labs, including DRDL, SSPL, INMAS, FRL, ISSA, DESIDOC, DIFR, SAG, ITM etc.

In 1982, the laboratory moved to a new technical building in Metcalfe House complex and was renamed as Defence Science Centre. The centre consolidated its R&D activities towards more specific and application oriented areas, such as liquid fuel technology, spectroscopy, crystallography, system engineering, biotechnology etc. DSL now started concentrating in the area of pure sciences such as physics, chemistry and mathematics. The chemistry division developed G-fuel and unsymmetrical dimethylhydrazine (UDMH) for rockets and missiles. The Mathematics division conducted simulation and calculations related to the missile program, while the Physics division took the lead by launching many activities.

DSC was also given a new charter of duties with its major thrust on lasers. Intensive work commenced on solid-state lasers, carbon dioxide lasers, ALARM, laser rangefinder, fibre optic gyroscope, ring laser gyroscopes, laser intruder alarm systems, etc. In 1986, the centre was made responsible for the development of high power lasers for Defence applications as one of its major missions. The lab was renamed LASTEC on 1 Aug 1999 to emphasize its core focus of laser technology. As of 2020, LASTEC is no longer functional or act as an independent laboratory. All the staff members have been transferred to DRDO labs in Hyderabad.

== Application ==
In the field of high-power lasers, LASTEC worked in the following fields:

- Chemical oxygen iodine laser
- Gas dynamic laser
- Hf-Df laser

== Areas of work ==
LASTEC's primary focus was the research and development of various laser materials, components and laser systems, including High Power Lasers (HPL) for defence-applications. The main charter of the lab revolved around progressing in areas of photonics, electro-optic counter measures (EOCM), low and high-power lasers (HPL). LASTEC also developed and delivered directed-energy weapon systems for the Indian Armed Forces, based on high-power laser technology. As a defence technology spin off, LASTEC had also been engaged in the development of lasers for medical and other civilian applications.
