= Defence Electronics Research Laboratory =

Indian military research institute

Defence Electronics & Research Laboratory
- Established: 1961
- Director: K Murali, OS
- Staff: 12 DEFENCE INTELEGENCE ARE ON WORK
- Location: Chandrayangutta Lines, Hyderabad-500005, Hyderabad, Telangana
- Operating agency: DRDO
- Website: DLRL Home Page

Defence Electronics Research Laboratory (DLRL) is a laboratory of the Defence Research & Development Organization (DRDO). Located in Hyderabad, it is actively involved in the design and development of integrated electronic warfare systems for the Indian Armed Forces.

== History ==
DLRL was established in 1961 under DRDO, in order to meet the needs and requirements of electronic warfare systems for the Indian Armed Forces, including communication and radar systems. These functions were later handed over to specialized laboratories. Communication cipher equipment, developed by DLRL, was successfully deployed in the 1965 war with Pakistan.

It was founded by S. P. Chakravarti, the father of Electronics and Telecommunication engineering in India, who also founded LRDE and DRDL.

DLRL was included on the list of Indian entities that were subjected to US sanctions announced after the May 1998 nuclear tests.

The testing and evaluation of EW systems demand huge infrastructure, test and evaluation facilities. To cater to this requirement, ELSEC, an extension of DLRL, was established in 1998 on a 180 acre campus. EW system simulation and modeling facilities are located inside ELSEC to carry out simulation of complex systems.

== Areas of Work ==
DLRL has been entrusted with the primary responsibility of design & development of state-of-the-art electronic warfare systems (COMINT/ELINT/ESM/ECM) covering radar and communication frequency bands. It also conducts systems integration and evaluation of these technologies on various platforms, like aircraft, ships, helicopters, vehicles, etc.

Additionally, DLRL also conducts specialized training courses in Electronic Warfare and technology management for DRDO Scientists and officers of the Indian Armed Forces.

Currently DLRL is involved in the Integrated Guided Missile Development Program (IGMDP), providing ground electronic support for IGMDP, and expertise in the design and development of various components, antennas and sub-systems for HF to microwave and millimetric wave frequencies.

=== Facilities ===
DLRL has various design, manufacture and testing facilities:

- Mechanical CAD/CAE/CAM facility - For design, packaging and manufacture of electronic systems and LRUs. Mechanical Fabrication Facility, Thermal and Structural analysis facilities are also available in this center.
- Hybrid Micro-electronics Facility - For fabrication of microwave integrated circuits for specific applications. Both thin film and thick film hybrids are also fabricated for in-house use.
- ASIC Design workstations
- Anechoic chamber and Open Test Ranges - For testing different types of antennas and Radomes covering Microwave & millimetric wave Frequencies.
- Automation Test and Measurement Laboratory - This facility caters to the fine grain analysis and parametric evaluation of various RF components, devices, Subsystems/ Systems of EW suites covering a frequency range of 10 MHz to 40 GHz.
- EMI/EMC Test Laboratory - This lab tests Components and Sub Systems to testing in the frequency range of 30 Hz to 40 GHz for emission testing and 30 Hz to 18 GHz for susceptibility testing.
- Environmental Test Laboratory - This facility consists of environmental chambers, bump and vibrations test set ups and is used for performing environmental tests on different electronic sub-systems and systems.
- PCB Design and fabrication Facility - The facility caters to the in-house requirement of double and multi-layer PCBs. The fabrication facility is capable of handling up to 12 layers with RF microwave CAE CAD.

== Projects and Products ==
In close coordination with various production agencies, other DRDO/National Laboratories and academic institutions, DLRL has designed, developed and produced a large number of ruggedised Electronic Warfare (EW) Systems. These systems have been inducted into the Services after rigorous field evaluation and user testing.

=== Advanced Self Protection Jammer (ASPJ) ===
The Advanced Self Protection Jammer Pod is made to defend against airborne multi-role radars, target acquisition radars, fire-control radar, and anti-aircraft artillery. It gives the HAL Tejas the ability to engage in electronic warfare. HAL Tejas Mk1/Mk1A fighters, HAL Tejas Mk2, and Sukhoi Su-30MKI aircraft, will all have ASPJ installed. It is a component of DRDO's larger endeavor to make HAL Tejas more mission-ready by integrating locally produced radar, EW systems, and armaments.

The ASPJ Pod has an integrated cooling system and is built on an active phased array, ultra wide band digital radio frequency memory. Exciter Receiver Processor, Active Transmit Receive Unit, Vivaldi Antenna Array Unit, and Air Cycle Machine-based cooling system are few of the subsystems that make up the ASPJ Pod. Flight testing of the Advanced Self Protection Jammer is underway as of 2023. There will be 16 to 32 Active Transmit/Receive Units used by the ASPJ pod in Tejas. It is included in the upgraded electronic warfare package for the Super Sukhoi project.

On 5 December 2025, DRDO transferred the technology of indigenous high-voltage power supply for the ASPJ to the Indian industry.

== Ex - Directors ==
- V. Narayana Rao
- E. Bhagiratha Rao
- K. Swamynathan
- K. Raghunathan
- K. K. Srivasthava
- N. Diwakar
- G. Kumaraswamy Rao
- Dr R Srihari Rao
- G. Boopathy
- S.P. Dash
- Dr C G Balaji

== Ex - Scientists ==
- G. Kanttaiah
- A. Rama Rao - First officer of DLRL
- DMSR MURTHY
- Dr. B. Lakshmi Narayana
- Dr K B Srinivasa Chary
