= V. Narayana Rao =

Indian defence scientist (1921–2009)

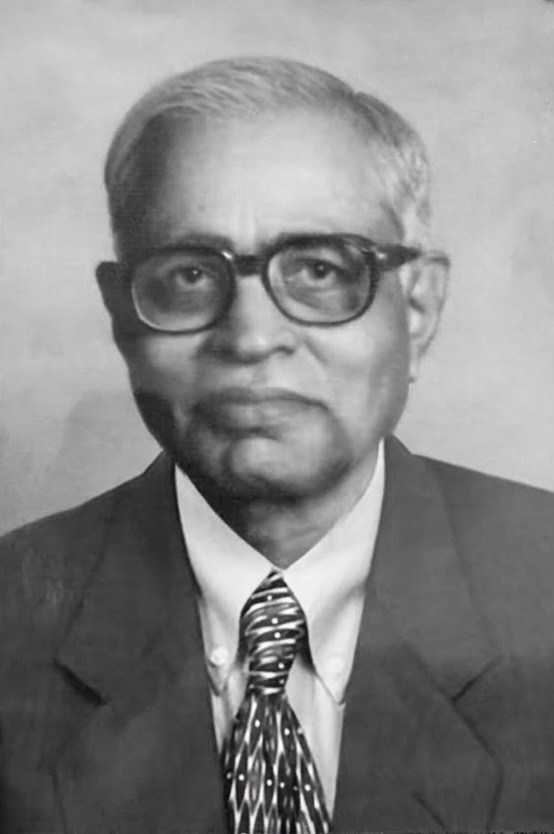
- V. Narayana Rao
- Born: Vakkaleri Narayana Rao; 20 December 1921; Kolar, Karnataka, India
- Died: 13 August 2009 (aged 87); Bangalore, Karnataka, India
- Occupations: Defence scientist, radar technologist
- Known for: Electronic warfare; founding DLRL, Hyderabad; Radar Laboratory at IISc
- Spouse: Shakuntala
- Children: Three daughters
- Parent(s): Sripathi Rao (father); Kamalamma (mother)
- Awards: Padma Shri (1982); VASVIK Industrial Research Award (1978)

Vakkaleri Narayana Rao (20 December 1921 – 13 August 2009) was an Indian defence scientist and radar technologist who was among the earliest developers of electronic warfare capabilities in India. He served as the first and founding Director of the Defence Electronics Research Laboratory (DLRL), Hyderabad, from its establishment in 1962 until his retirement at the end of 1981. He was also a Lecturer in Radar Technology at the Indian Institute of Science (IISc), Bangalore, where he established the institute's Radar Laboratory. The Government of India awarded him the fourth highest Indian civilian honour of Padma Shri in 1982, in the Science & Engineering category.

== Biography ==
=== Early life and family ===
Narayana Rao was born on 20 December 1921 in Kolar, in the south Indian state of Karnataka, to Kamalamma and Sripathi Rao, a government accounts officer, as the third of their eight children. The family name Vakkaleri is a hereditary toponym, indicating the family's ancestral origins in the village of Vakkaleri in the Kolar district of Karnataka. The family later settled in Bangalore.

He did his early schooling at Chamrajpet and Vishweshwarpuram, Bangalore, and completed his secondary education at Shimoga High School and Fort High School, Bangalore.

=== Education ===
He continued his education at the Intermediate College, Bangalore, and passed his undergraduate degree in Physics with honours in 1943 from the Central College of Bangalore, under Madras University. His Master of Science degree in Physics, completed with distinction, was awarded by the University of Mysore in 1945.

He was subsequently deputed by the Government of India for advanced studies in the United Kingdom under the Dalal Scheme, a government overseas scholarship programme administered by the Ministry of Education. He undertook training at the British Broadcasting Corporation and the Marconi College of Wireless Communications in Chelmsford, followed by a period of research at the Manchester College of Technology (MCT), University of Manchester. This research earned him a patent. In 1948, his thesis was accepted and he was awarded the Master of Science (Technology) degree in Electrical Engineering — MSc Tech — from the University of Manchester.

=== Career ===
==== Hindustan Aeronautics Limited and IISc (1945–1946) ====
After completing his MSc from Mysore University, Rao briefly joined Hindustan Aeronautics Limited (HAL) as a trainee in the Radio department. He then joined the Indian Institute of Science (IISc), Bangalore, where Prof. S. P. Chakravarti, Head of the Department of Electrical Communication Engineering, assigned him a research project on fading problems in short-wave communications. Shortly thereafter, Rao moved to assist Vikram Sarabhai — later the founder of India's space programme — at a cosmic ray research laboratory set up in Pune.

==== All India Radio, Delhi (1948–1950) ====
On his return to India in August 1948, Rao joined All India Radio as an Assistant Engineer at the High Power Transmitting Station (HPT), Delhi.

==== Lecturer in Radar Technology, IISc, Bangalore (1950–1954) ====
In 1950, Rao was appointed Lecturer in Radar Technology at the Department of Electrical Communication Engineering, Indian Institute of Science (IISc), Bangalore, where he served for four years. During this period he established the Radar Laboratory at IISc, one of India's first dedicated radar research facilities.

==== Naval Physical and Oceanographic Laboratory, Kochi (1954–1962) ====
In 1954, Rao joined the Defence Research and Development Organisation (DRDO) and was posted to the Naval Physical and Oceanographic Laboratory (NPOL), formerly the Indian Naval Physical Laboratory, Kochi, where he initiated research in several areas of naval electronics.

==== Founding Director, Defence Electronics Research Laboratory, Hyderabad (1962–1981) ====
Prof. S. P. Chakravarti, who joined DRDO in 1959 as Deputy Chief Scientific Officer upon request of Defence Minister V. K. Krishna Menon, is credited with conceiving and establishing three major defence electronics laboratories: the Electronics and Radar Development Establishment (LRDE) in Bangalore, the Defence Electronics Research Laboratory (DLRL) in Hyderabad, and the Defence Research and Development Laboratory (DRDL). In this capacity, Chakravarti was responsible for establishing DLRL as part of India's defence electronics programme. Chakravarti and Rao had a prior professional association dating to the mid-1940s, when Chakravarti had headed the ECE Department at IISc during Rao's early research career there.

Rao was appointed the first and founding Director of DLRL upon its establishment in 1962. He built the laboratory from its infancy into a national establishment engaged in research, design, and development of electronics systems for all three branches of the Indian Armed Forces.

Under his leadership, DLRL made the country self-reliant in a number of defence electronics requirements. Among its achievements was the indigenous development and production of the Secondary Surveillance Radar, successfully substituting an imported system with an Indian-designed one placed into regular production, for which the Laboratory received the Gold Shield.

Rao retired as Director of DLRL at the end of 1981. Following retirement, he returned to live in Bangalore.

=== Awards ===
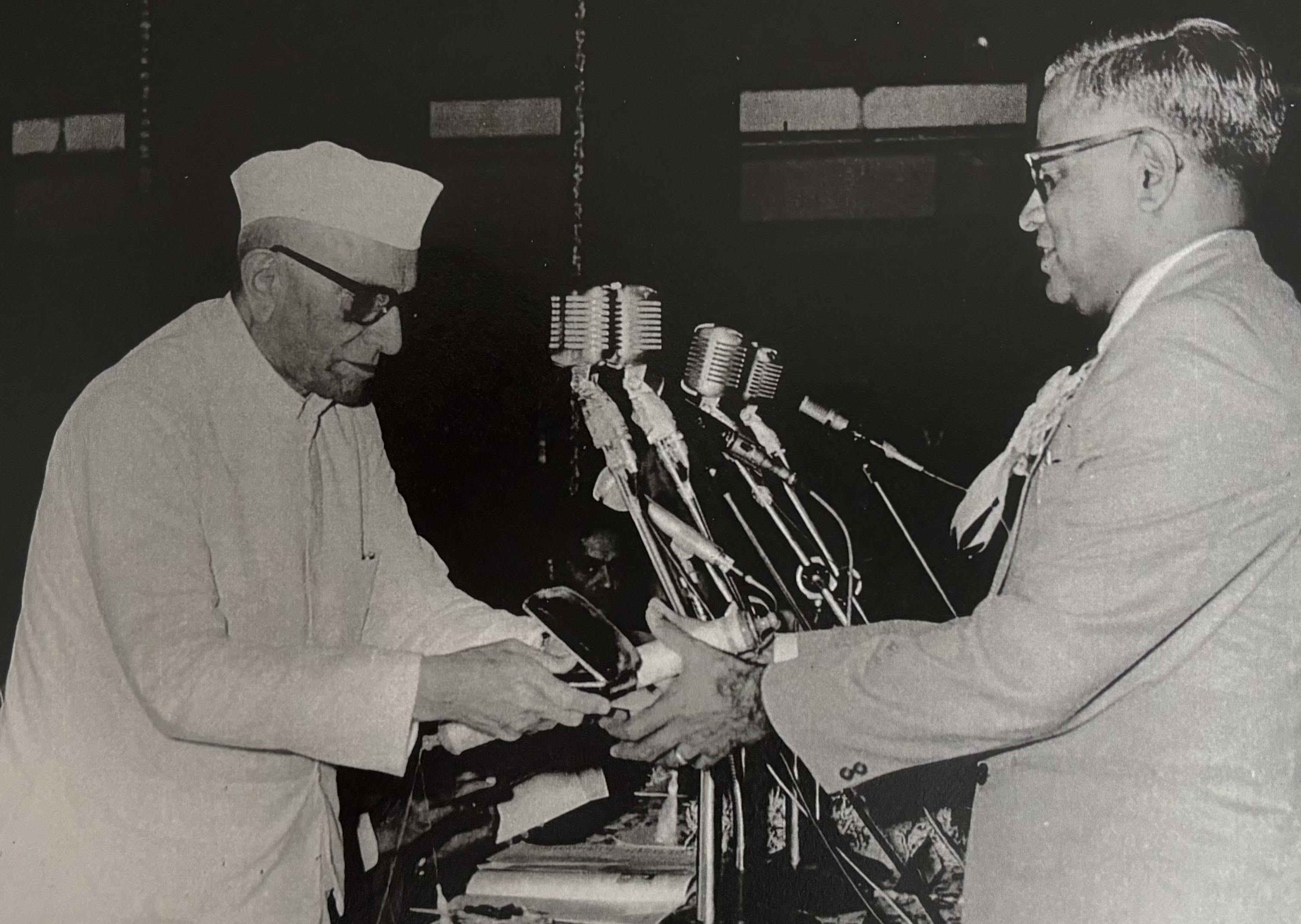
V. Narayana Rao receiving the VASVIK Industrial Research Award from Prime Minister Morarji Desai, 1978.

Rao received the VASVIK Industrial Research Award in 1978, in the Electronic Sciences & Technology category, which he shared with two of his colleagues.

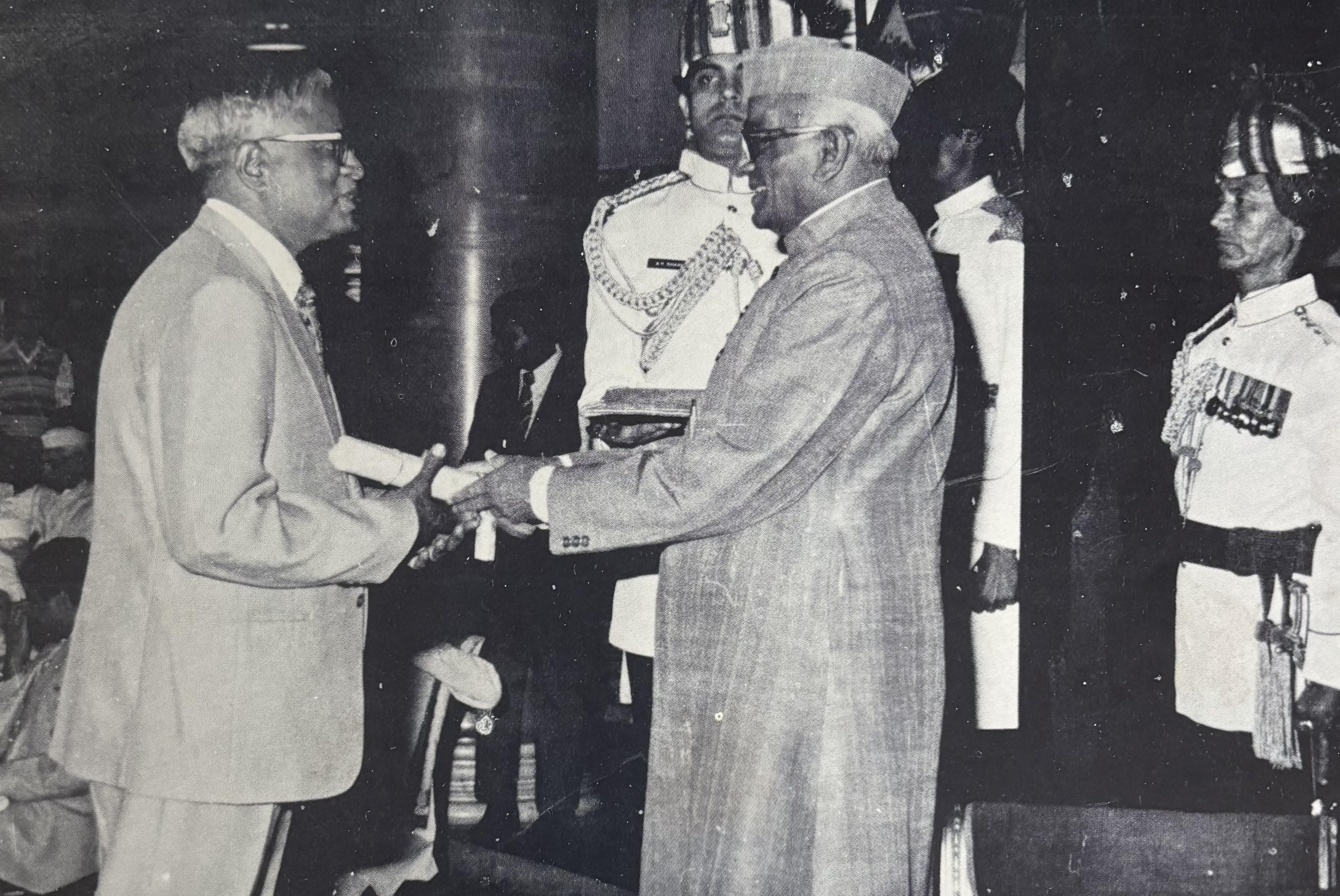
V. Narayana Rao receiving the Padma Shri from President Neelam Sanjiva Reddy, 1982.

The Government of India awarded him the Padma Shri in 1982, in the Science & Engineering category, in recognition of his contributions to defence electronics and electronic warfare in India.

=== Publications ===
Narayana Rao had approximately 30 scientific and technical publications to his credit. Among his confirmed publications are "Self-reliance in microwave technology in India" (IETE Technical Review, 1993, 10(3)) and "High power microwave tubes" (presented at the National Workshop on Excellence in Electronics, Department of Electronics, Government of India, New Delhi, March 1983). He also authored the monograph Reminiscences of a Defence Scientist: A Quest for Self-Reliance (DESIDOC, DRDO Special Publications Series, 2007), which provides a biographical account of his life alongside a history of India's development of electronic warfare capabilities.

=== Personal life ===
He was married to Shakuntala and the couple had three daughters. He died in Bangalore on 13 August 2009, at the age of 87.

== See also ==
- Defence Electronics Research Laboratory
- Defence Research and Development Organisation
- Naval Physical and Oceanographic Laboratory
- Indian Institute of Science
- Electronic warfare
- S. P. Chakravarti
