= Mohamed Zainuddin Juvale =

- Born: 10 January 1890; Maharashtra, India
- Occupation: Naval captain
- Known for: First nautical school in India
- Awards: Padma Shri

Mohamed Zainuddin Juvale, popularly known as Captain Fakir Mohamed Zainuddin Juvale, was an Indian naval captain and one of the pioneers of the trade from the Konkan region in the western Indian state of Maharashtra. Born on 10 January 1890 in a Konkani Muslim family, Juvale had only primary education and started his career as a Khalasi (sailor) in a merchant ship. Over the years, he rose in ranks to become the captain of the vessel, reportedly the only Indian to achieve the feat.

After retirement, Juvale founded the first nautical school in India, Kokan Nautical School, in 1923 at Dongri, Mumbai for imparting sea man training to Konkan youth. The Government of India awarded him the fourth highest Indian civilian honour of Padma Shri in 1981. The Shipping Corporation of India named one of their supply ships in his honour as M. V. Capt FM Juvale in 1998. He documented his life in an autobiography, The Ebbs and Flows of My Marine Life which is written in Marathi.
