= Darshan Singh Vohra =

Indian Army officer and engineer

- Born: Punjab, India
- Occupations: Engineer; Army personnel
- Known for: Nevedac Prosthetic Centre
- Awards: Padma Shri

Darshan Singh Vohra was an Indian Army officer, an engineer, one of the pioneers of prosthetics in Asia and the founder of the first prosthetic centre in Asia, Artificial Limb Centre, Pune and Nevedac Prosthetic Centre, another prosthetic facility in Chandigarh. After obtaining advanced training in prosthetics from Germany and England, he joined the Indian Army and was holding the rank of a colonel at the time of his superannuation. He founded the first prosthetic centre in Asia, Artificial Limb Centre, immediately after World War II, in 1944, at Pune, for the rehabilitation of soldiers who lost their limbs in war and the facility has grown to become a 190 bedded healthcare centre, working attached to the Armed Forces Medical College, Pune.

After retiring from the Army, the Government of Punjab invited him to set up a similar centre in Punjab and he established Nevedac Prosthetic Centre, in the village of Zirakpur in the state in 1972. He served as an honorary adviser to the Government of Punjab, Government of Haryana and Chandigarh Administration and was a consultant to the National Industrial Corporation Limited, New Delhi for the setting up of the Artificial Limbs Manufacturing Corporation at Kanpur. Holder of a doctoral degree in Therapeutic Philosophy from The World University, Arizona, he was a fellow of the British Institute of Surgical Technologists, Artificial Limb Fitters, Great Britain and the Orthotics - Prosthetics Society of India and was a member of the Orthopaedic Works, West Germany and the International Society for Prosthetics and Orthotics, Copenhagen (ISPO). He also served as the president of the Orthotic - Prosthetic Society of India, from 1987 to 1991. The Government of India awarded him the fourth highest civilian honour of Padma Shri in 1988.

== See also ==
- Prosthetics
