= Mair (caste) =

Indian caste

The Mair are an Indian caste found in Punjab, Haryana, Rajasthan, Delhi and other surrounding areas. In Haryana, they are called Deshwali Sunar.
