= S. V. S. Raghavan =

Indian industrialist

- Born: India
- Occupation: Industrialist
- Known for: Corporate governance
- Awards: Padma Shri

S. V. S. Raghavan is an Indian industrialist and the former head of Bharat Business International Limited (BBIL). He headed the Bharat Heavy Electricals Limited in the 1980s after which served Ashok Leyland and Texmaco before taking up the chairmanship of Minerals and Metals Trading Corporation (MMTC). In March 1990, he was appointed as the chairman of BBIL, an apex organization which had MMTC and State Trading Corporation of India (STC) as its subsidiaries. Recipient of National Citizen Award by the President of India-1989, Retired in the rank of Secretary in Ministry of Commerce, Govt. of India, Chairman of the Committee on Competition Law & Policy, Retired Member of the Indian Defence Accounts Services.

Raghavan has also served several public sector industries in India such as Kerala Ayurveda Limited, Gujarat Sidhee Cement Limited, Saurashtra Cement Limited and Bhuruka Gases Limited, as the chairman or director. In between, he has been the executive chairman of the Competition Commission of India, the watchdog organization set up by the Government of India for the enforcement of The Competition Act, 2002. During this period, he headed the Central Government committee of 2000 set up for advising policy guidelines on competition and corporate governance, which later came to be known as SVS Raghavan Committee. In September 2006, he was made the emeritus Chairman of the Kerala Ayurveda Limited, after his superannuation from service.

== Awards ==
The Government of India awarded him the fourth highest Indian civilian honour of Padma Shri in 1985.

== See also ==
- Bharat Heavy Electricals Limited
- Ashok Leyland
- Minerals and Metals Trading Corporation
- Competition Commission of India
