= Anil Kumar Lakhina =

Indian Administrative Service Officer

- Born: India
- Occupation: Civil servant
- Known for: Public governance
- Awards: Padma Shri; National Real Estate Award

Anil Kumar Lakhina is an Indian civil servant and a former Indian Administrative Service officer, known for his administrative reforms which has since come to be known as the Lakhina pattern. He is credited with the urban planning of Navi Mumbai, besides the commissioning of several other major projects. The Government of India awarded him the fourth highest Indian civilian honour of Padma Shri in 1986.

== Biography ==
Lakhina graduated in science (BSc) from the University of Delhi after which he secured the degree of the Master of Public Administration from the John F. Kennedy School of Government of Harvard University and followed it with a graduate degree in law from Punjab University. After getting selected into the Indian Administrative Service, he served as the Collector and the District Magistrate of Ahmednagar district in Maharashtra, where he introduced many office reforms such as enhancement of office environment, simplification of procedures and betterment of customer relations which came to be known as the Lakhina pattern. In 1999, he was appointed as the head of the City and Industrial Development Corporation and he stayed at the position till 2003 during which period he is reported to have contributed to the establishment of the Navi Mumbai Special Economic Zone. His contributions are also reported behind the planning and execution of three major projects, Bandra–Worli Sea Link, Mumbai Trans Harbour Link, and the Mumbai Pune Expressway and in the urban planning of Navi Mumbai. His next assignment was as the head of the Animal Husbandry Department of the Government of Maharashtra followed by a short stint at the Maharashtra State Financial Corporation. In 2005, he joined the Rural Electrification Corporation Limited (REC) as the chairman and managing director and worked there till his 2008 move to the Maharashtra State Road Development Corporation as the managing director.

Lakhina served as the Commissioner of Food and Drug Administration and as the Export Commissioner of India before superannuating from the government service. Later, he founded a non governmental organization, Forum for the Advancement of Solar Thermal (FAST) for promoting grid based solar thermal power generation. He is associated with Genesys International Corporation Limited, Dun & Bradstreet Tangram Advisory Services Private Limited, the SunBorne Energy group of companies and Lanco Amarkantak Power Limited as a director.

The Government of India awarded the civilian honour of Padma Shri to Lakhina in 1986. He is also a recipient of the National Real Estate Award, which he received in 2013.

== See also ==
- Bandra–Worli Sea Link
- Mumbai Trans Harbour Link
- Mumbai Pune Expressway
- International Consortium of Investigative Journalists
