= S. P. Chakravarti =

Indian engineer and educator

Siddheshwari Prasad Chakravarti
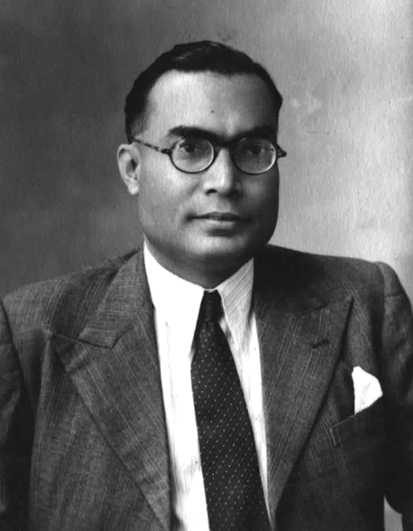
- Born: 3 November 1904; Rampurhat, Bengal Presidency, British India
- Died: 15 July 1981 (aged 76); Lucknow, Uttar Pradesh, India
- Education: University of Lucknow; Imperial College, London
- Occupations: Engineer, Researcher, Educator
- Years active: 1930-'81
- Organisation(s): IISc Bangalore; JEC Jabalpur; University of Saugor; University of Jabalpur; DRDO
- Known for: Establishing Electronics & Telecommunication engineering education, research and training in India

Prof. Siddheshwari Prasad Chakravarti was an Indian engineer, researcher, and educator. He was known as the father of electronics and telecommunications engineering in India. He single-handedly contributed to more than half of India's total research in electronics and telecommunications engineering at the time He established electronics and telecommunications education, research and training in India.

== Education ==
He was educated at the University of Lucknow and Imperial College London.

== Career ==
=== Academia ===
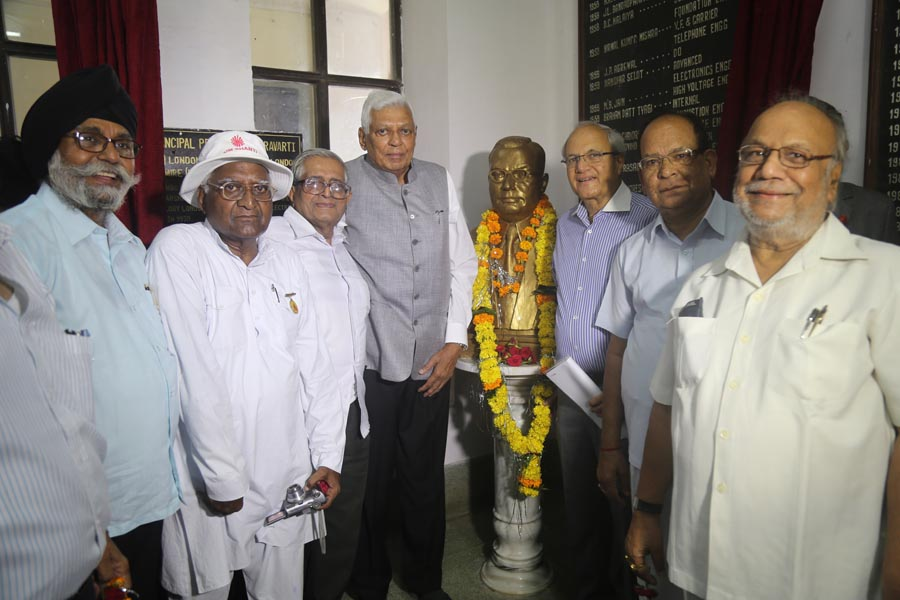
Dr. S. P. Chakravarti's bust at the Jabalpur Engineering College (JEC), of which, he was the founding Principal

He served as Head of the Electrical engineering department at Indian Institute of Science, Bangalore, as the founding Principal of Government Engineering College, Jabalpur, the oldest technical institution in central India, where he established the first Electronics & Telecommunications engineering department of India, and as the first Dean of the Faculties of Engineering of the University of Saugor and the University of Jabalpur. The State Technological University of Madhya Pradesh has instituted a gold medal in his memory.

=== Research ===
Post retirement from academia, he joined the Defence Research and Development Organisation, in 1959, upon request of the then Defence Minister of India, V K Krishna Menon, as Dy. Chief Scientific Officer. During his tenure at DRDO, he was responsible for the founding of three major research laboratories of DRDO, viz., Electronics and Radar Development Establishment (LRDE) Bengaluru, Defence Electronics Research Laboratory (DLRL) Hyderabad and the Defence Research and Development Laboratory (DRDL) Delhi. He served as the first Director of the Laser Science and Technology Centre (LASTEC) Delhi.

=== Professional ===
He was the National Vice-President of the Institution of Engineers (India) and the Institution of Electronics and Telecommunication Engineers. He was a distinguished fellow of the Indian Academy of Sciences, and the Institution of Electronics and Telecommunication Engineers.

== Posts ==
During his career, he held the following posts:

- Lecturer, Department of Electrical Communication Engineering, Indian Institute of Science, Bangalore
- Lecturer, Department of Applied Physics, University of Calcutta
- Officer on Special Duty (Radio), Department of Commerce, Govt. of India
- Radio Controller, Department of Industries and Supply, Govt. of India
- Professor and Head of the Department of Electrical Technology at the Indian Institute of Science, Bangalore and Head of the Central Workshop
- Principal of Government Engineering College, Jabalpur
- Dean of the Faculties of Engineering of the University of Saugor and the University of Jabalpur
- Dy-Chief Scientific Officer (Electronics) Defence Research and Development Organisation
- Director of Electronics (Acting) R & D, Ministry of Defence (India).
- Technical Director, Scientific Research Cell, R & D, Ministry of Defence and Director Weapons Evaluation Est., R & D.
- Director, Scientific Liaison, Headquarters, Ministry of Defence.
- Director, Defence Science Laboratory, Metcalfe House, Delhi
- Member of Electro Technical Council, Indian Standards Institution for 4 years.
- Chairman Electronics and Telecommunication Group, and then of DIVISION, for a total period of 9 years. During this period, he was responsible for raising Electronics and Telecommunication Engineering Division to a major DIVISION.
- Member of Faculty of Engineering of Pune University for 3 years.
- Member of Faculty of IIT BHU for 4 years.
- Member of the Court of Nagpur University for 9 years.
- Member of the Court of Indian Institute of Science, Bangalore for 8 years.
- Member of Radio Research Committee, Government of India, 1944–47 and again 1959-63.
- Member of Defence Electronics Research Committee for 5 years.
- Member of the Defence Electronics Development Panel for 5 years.
- Convenor of Study Panels of Institution of Engineers (India) on Instrumentation and Automation for 2 years.
- Paper Setter and Examiner of Union Public Service Commission.
- National Vice-President of the Institution of Engineers (India) and the Institution of Electronics and Telecommunication Engineers

== Publications ==
He contributed to more than half of India's total research in electronics and telecommunications engineering at the time

=== On Atmospherics & Electrical Interference in Radio Broadcasting in India ===
- 1. "Atmospherics at Bangalore during the Polar Year" by S.P. Chakravarti & B.H. Paranjpye (Published in Journal of Indian Institute of Science, 1934).
- 2. "Field strength of Atmospherics on Wave-lengths from 10 to 500 metres at Calcutta" by S.P. Chakravarti (published in L'onde Electrique, March 1939).
- 3. "Wave-form of Atmospherics at Calcutta" by S.P. Chakravarti. (Published in L'onde Electrique, April 1939).
- 4. "Atmospherics at Radio Broadcasting Reception at Calcutta" by S.P. Chakravarti, P.B. Ghosh & H. Ghosh (Published in Proc. IRE, Dec. 1939).
- 5. "Electrical Interference in Radio Broadcast Reception" by S.P. Chakravarti & N.L. Dutt. (Published in Indian Journal of Physics, October 1941).

=== On Radio Problems ===
- 6. "Field Strength of Delhi 3 and Delhi 4 at Calcutta during Solar Eclipse on 21st September 1941" by S.P. Chakravarti (Published in Proc. IRE, June 1943).
- 7. "On Possible Effect of Atomic Bomb Test at Bikini on Radio Reception on 25th July 1946" by S.P. Chakravarti (Published in Current Science, August 1946).
- 8. "On Echo Suppression in Radio and Wire Telephony" by S.P. Chakravarti (Published in Electro-technics 1933).
- 9. "Special Radio Test Transmissions on 12th and 13th March 1935" (In connection with Sullivan standard Frequency Equipment installed by the author at Bangalore Institute). Published in Electrotechnics, April 1935) by S.P. Chakravarti.
- 10. "A New Secrecy Device for Communication Systems" by S.P. Chakravarti. (Published in Engineering Technics, November 1954). (Paper read at Indian Telegraph Centenary Convention, New Delhi, in November 1953).
- 11. "On Jamming of Distant Radio Signals" by S.P. Chakravarti (being Chairman's address at Annual General Meeting of I.E., at New Delhi in February 1960). (Published in J. Institution of Engineers (I) in September 1960).
- 12. "On Stability in Communication Apparatus or System and its Measurements" by S.P. Chakravarti. (Published in Engineering Technics, July 1951).

=== On VHF Microwave and Laser Communications ===
- 13. "On Some measurements on Micro Radio Waves of Wavelengths from 15 to 19 cm" by P.N. Das & S.P. Chakravarti. (Published in Electra- Technics, 1945).
- 14. "Investigations on the Possibility of Ultra-Short-wave FirstGrade Broadcasting in India" by S.P. Chakravarti (Published in Electro-technics, 1945).
- 15. "Ultra Short Waves to Replace Medium Waves in Regional Broadcasting in India" by S.P. Chakravarti (Published in Electro-technics, No. 19, 1946).
- 16. "On Propagation of Radio Waves beyond the Horizon" by S.P. Chakravarti. (Published in Engineering Technics, November 1954).
- 17. "Some Recent Advances in Micro-wave Engineering" by S.P. Chakravarti (Published in JIE(I), January 1962).
- 18. "Modem Electronics Communication Techniques" by S.P. Chakravarti (Published in JIE(l), August 1967).
- 19. "Laser Communication" by S.P. Chakravarti (Published in JIE(I), 1968).390 J. INSTN ELECTRONICS & TELECOM. ENGRS., Vol. 28, No. 8, 1982
- 20. "Tropospheric Scatter Micro-Wave Links" by S.P. Chakravarti (Published in JIE(I), 1969).
- 21. "Development of Telecommunication Network in India since 1950" by S.P. Chakravarti & V.V.L. Rao, January 1970, Published in JIE(I).

=== On Transistor & Semiconductor Devices ===
- 22. "Current Rectification at Metal Contacts" by S.P. Chakravarti and S.R. Kantabet (Published in Proc. IRE September 1932).
- 23. "A Note on Internal Noise in Transistors" by S.P. Chakravarti (Published in Engineering Technics. 1956).
- 24. "On Crystal Resonator with Transistor Negative Impedance Element" (Communicated for publication).

=== On Thermionic Negative Impedance Elements in Networks and with Wave Filters and Crystal Resonators Band-Pass and Wide-band Effects ===
- 25. "On the Nature of Negative Resistance and Negative Resistance Sections" by S.P. Chakravarti (Published in Phi/. Magazine, October 1940).
- 26 "On the Nature of Dynatron-type Negative Impedances at frequencies from 1 to 40 Mc/s" by S.P. Chakravarti & P.N. Das (Published in Proc. Ind. Assoc. for Cultivation of Sciences & Indian Journal of Physics, February 1943).
- 27. "On Voltage Amplification by Wave-filters terminated in Negative Resistances" by S.P. Chakravarti (Published in Proc. Indian Academy of Sciences.. 1934).
- 28. "On Wave-filters Terminated in Negative Resistances" by S.P. Chakravarti (Published in L'onde Electrique, March 1935).
- 29. "On Band-pass effect in Wave-filters Terminated in Negative Resistance" by S.P. Chakravarti (Published in Phi!. Mag., July 1938).
- 30. "On the Nature of Band-pass effect in Wave-filters Terminated in Negative Impedances" by S.P. Chakravarti (Published in Wireless Engineer 1941).
- 31. "Study of the Band-pass Effect by Cathode Ray Oscillograph" by S.P. Chakravarti (Published in Proc. Ind. Assoc. for Cultivation of Science & Indian Journal of Physics, Feb. 1943).
- 32. "On the Extension of Band-pass Effect at High Frequencies" by Miss Rajeshwari & S.P. Chakravarti (Published in Electrotechnics, No. 18, 1946).
- 33. "On Negative Resistance Equalizers for Transmission Systems", by S.P. Chakravarti (Published in Phi!. Mag., May 1937).
- 34. "On Some Calculations Relating to Band-pass Effect in Crystal Resonator Associated with Thermionic Negative Impedance" by S.P. Chakravarti & Miss Rajeshawari (Published in Electrotechnics, No. 19, 1946)
- 35. "Wide Band-pass Effect in Crystals Associated with Negative Impedance Elements and Development of Wide-band Low-loss Crystal Band-pass Filter" by S.P. Chakravarti & N.L. Dutt (Published in Indian Journal of Physics, August 1940).
- 36. "On Theory of Performance of Wide and Ultra-wide-band Lattice Type Crystal Band-pass Filters Containing Stabilised Negative Impedance Elements" by S.P. Chakravarti (Published in Proc. Ind. Assoc. for Cultivation of Sciences & Indian Journal of Physics, June 1943).
- 37. "On the Sharpness of the Band-pass Effect" by S.P. Chakravarti (Published in Engineering Technics. June 1948).
- 38. "On the Sharpness of the Band-pass Effect in Quartz Crystal resonators" by S.P. Chakravarti (Published in Engineering Technics, June 1948).
- 39. "The Oscillating Band-pass Effect-A New Secrecy Device for Communication Systems" by S.P. Chakravarti (Published in Engineering Technics, June 1949).
- 40. "On the Design of wide Band Lattice Type Crystal Band-pass Filters Containing Thermionic Negative Impedance Elements" by S.P. Chakravarti (Published in Engineering Technics, November 1950).
- 41. "On the Transient Response in Band-pass Effect" by S.P. Chakravarti. (Published in Engineering Technics, October 1952).
- 42. "The Band-pass Effect". by S.P. Chakravarti (Monograph published by Telegraph Communication Engineers Association (India), August 1949).

=== On Multi-Channel Communication ===
- 43. "Telephony by Carrier and One Side-band" by S.P. Chakravarti (Published in Journal of Indian Institute of Science, Bangalore 1932).
- 44. "Carrier Current Telephony on Non-loaded Cable Circuits" by S.P. Chakravarti (Published in Revue General de' Electricite, May 1937).
- 45. "Telephony by Partially Transmitted Carrier and One Sideband" by S.P. Chakravarti (Published in L'onde Electrique, August 1937).
- 46. "Improvement in Telephone Transmission over Phantom Circuits by Bi-band Telephony" by S.P. Chakravarti (Published in L'onde Electrique, August 1935).
- 47. "Two-wire Carrier Telephone System for Non-loaded Cable Circuits of Air Space. Paper Core-Type" by S.P. ChakravarU (Published in Electrical Review, July 1937).
- 48. "Some Experiments on Bi-band Telephony" by S.P. Chakravarti (Published in Electro-Technique, 1935).
- 49. "Audio-Frequency Constants of Circuits and Telephone Lines" by S.P. Chakravarti (Published in JIEE, May 1933).
- 50. "New Type of Telegraph Repeator Employing Carrier Currents" by S.P. Chakra\arti (Published in Nature, 6 October 1934).
- 51. "On Dielectric Loss and Leakage in India-make Porcelain Insulator over Frequency Range-1-60 Mcjs" by R.N. Dewan and S.P. Chakravarti (Published in Engineering Technics. November 1950).
- 52. "On Multi-channel Communication in Frequency Range 3 KC/s-3000 MC/s" by S.P. Chakravarti (Published in Journal of Institution of Engineers, November 1958).

=== On Radio Industrial Problems ===
- 53. "On the manufacture of Loudspeakers in India" by S.P. Chakravarti (Published in A.B. Patrika, Puia Number, 1942).
- 54. "On the Manufacture of Wireless Apparatus in India" by S.P. Chakravarti (Contribution to Dictionary of Raw Materials and Industrial Resources, BSIR). (Published in the Journal of Scientific and Industrial Research, 1945).
- 55. "Instrumentation and Automation" by S.P. Chakravarti, A.K. Chatterjee & H.N. Rama Chandra Rao (Published in JIE(l), 1966).
- 56. "Development of Electronic industry in India" by S.P. Chakravarti & (Brig) M.K. Rao (Published in Souvenir of the Seventh Commonwealth Engineering Conference, India, November 1969).

== Inventions ==
List of inventions of Prof. Chakravarti:

- Filter Converter and Width Adjuster & Band-pass Amplifier. "A band-pass filter for electrical communication systems". (British Patents No. 537439)
- "Ultra wide-band low-loss band-pass filter constructed from piezo-electrical crystal or crystals and stabilised negative impedance element or elements for radio and television systems". (British Patent No. 537797)
- "A new secrecy device for communication systems".

== Notable students ==
Some of his notable students include:

- B. V. Baliga - Former Managing Director of Bharat Electronics Limited, and the father of B. Jayant Baliga, the inventor of IGBT.
- G. S. Sanyal - Former Director of IIT Kharagpur.
- Vasant Mulay - Established Doordarshan's first TV station.
- Rajeshwari Chatterjee- First female engineer from the state of Karnataka, later went on to become the chairperson of the department of Electrical Communication Engineering at IISc Bangalore.
