= Mukti Prasad Gogoi =

Indian physician (1931–2021)

- Born: November 4, 1931
- Died: April 24, 2021 (aged 89)
- Citizenship: India
- Occupations: physician, writer
- Parents: Trailokya Nath Gogoi (father); Jeutara Gogoi (mother)
- Awards: Padma Shri

Mukti Prasad Gogoi (Assamese: মুক্তি প্ৰসাদ গগৈ; 4 November 1931 - 24 April 2021) was a physician and writer from Assam, India. He was awarded the Padma Shri by the Government of India in 1984. Pan-Bhojan, a book on Assamese cuisine, is one of his renowned books.

== Early life ==
Mukti Prasad Gogoi was born in Radhabari, Karimganj district of Assam. His father, Trailokya Nath Gogoi, was serving in the army and his mother, Jeutara Gogoi, was a housewife. He completed his primary education at Maran Primary School and passed his high school examination from Dibrugarh Government Higher Secondary School. He later studied medicine at the Assam Medical College, Dibrugarh after completing his higher education at Ripon College, Kolkata. In 1956, he obtained his medical degree from RG Kar Medical College, University of Calcutta. He received his diploma in obstetrics and gynecology in 1959.

== Career ==
Gogoi joined the Department of Obstetrics and Gynecology at Guwahati Medical College on 5 November 1962 as an assistant professor. He took over as Head of the department in 1973 and remained in this position until his retirement in 1988. He is credited with several technological upgrades of the Guwahati Medical College. He was also an elected member of the Royal Academy of Obstetricians and Gynecology in London and the National Academy of Medical Sciences of India.
