= Bhagwat Murmu =

Indian politician

Member of the Bihar Legislative Assembly
- In office 1957–1962
- Preceded by: Chandrashekhar Singh
- Succeeded by: Chandrashekhar Singh
- Constituency: Jhajha

Personal details
- Born: Bhagwat Murmu; 28 February 1928 Jamui, Bihar, India
- Died: 30 June 1998 (aged 70)
- Party: Indian National Congress

Bhagwat Murmu also known as Bhagwat Murmu Thakur (28 February 1928 – 30 June 1998) was an Indian politician belonged to Indian National Congress and Member of Bihar Legislative Assembly, 1957–1962. He was born into the Santal family in the village of Bela, located in the Khera block of Jamui district in Bihar, India. His interest in social welfare and community development grew, leading him to join the Sambhal Paharia Seva Mandal in Deoghar in 1952.

== Literary Contributions ==
Alongside his social work, Bhagwat Murmu 'Thakur' was also a prolific writer, penning poems, stories, and songs in Hindi, Santhali, and Bengali languages. He authored numerous books in the Devanagari script, many of which have been included in university curricula. Two of his songs are part of the syllabus for the Union Public Service Commission (UPSC) examination. Notably, his book Dong Sereng (Dong Song) is available on Amazon in both Santhali and Hindi versions[. Some of his notable literary works include "Sohrai Sereng" (Sohrai Song), "Sisirjon Rang" (poetry collection), "Barubeda" (novel), "Mayajal" (story), "Santhali Education," "Hindi Santhali Kosh Dictionary," and "Kohima" (12 folktales) published by Naganeth Bhasha Parishad.

== Awards ==
He was also known for first recipient of Padma Shri Award among Santal People being awarded on 16 March 1985.
