= Vedaratnam Appakutti =

Indian freedom fighter and social worker

- Born: Vedaranyam, Nagapattinam district, Tamil Nadu, India
- Other name: Vedaratnam Appakutti Pillai
- Occupation: Social worker
- Parent: A. Vedaratnam Pillai
- Awards: Padma Shri

Vedaratnam Appakutti Pillai was an Indian freedom fighter, social worker and the co-founder of Kasturba Gandhi National Memorial Trust, a non profit non governmental organization working for the welfare of women in the rural areas of Indian state of Tamil Nadu.

== Early life ==
Born into a family of salt merchants in the state of Tamil Nadu to A. Vedaratnam, a freedom activist, he contributed to the efforts of his father to found Kasturba Gandhi Kanya Gurukulam, a rural residential school for girls from financially challenged families, at Vedaranyam, in Nagapattinam district of the state. The establishment has grown over the years to house a printing school, electronics and computer training school and an incense manufacturing unit. The Government of India awarded him the fourth highest civilian honour of Padma Shri in 1989.
