= Khalasi =

Traditional craftsmen of Beypore engaged in Uru construction

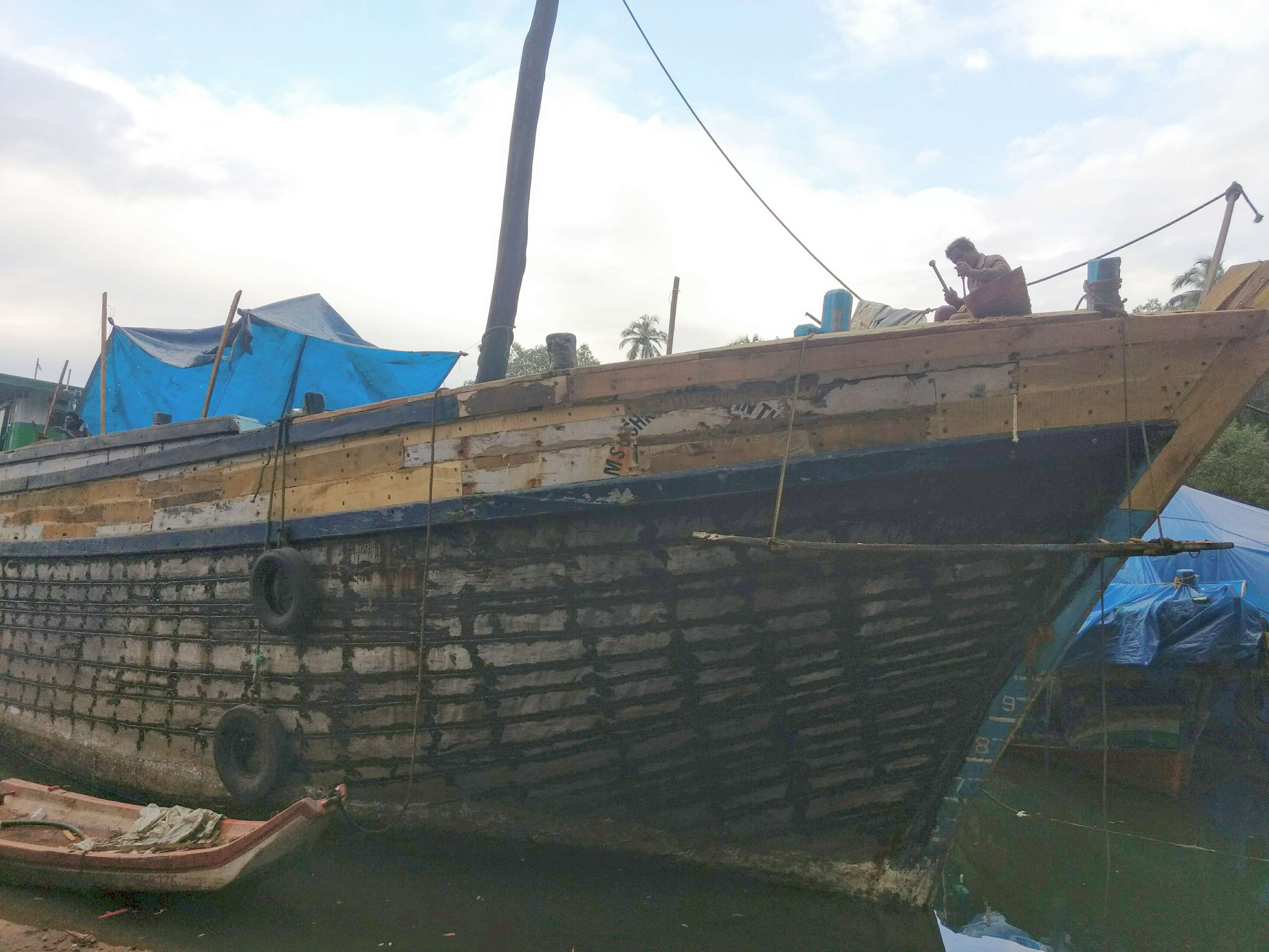
Traditional workers at Beypore repairing an Uru

Khalasis are skilled natives engaged in constructing handmade seagoing Uru boats at Beypore port town of Kerala, India. Since the majority of them are traditional Mappila Muslims, they are also called Mappila Khalasis. They also draw Urus ashore for repair and maintenance. Khalasi in Arabic means dockyard worker, sailor, or lascar.

Dabber (daver), slenky, ropes and pulley were the only tools used. The Khalasis mainly relied on physical strength, skill and teamwork. Many of them are skilled divers. Khalasis work under a leader called Mooppan. Khalasis are employed at Cochin and Visakhapatnam ports. The services of Khalasis were utilized by the Railways for retrieving the bodies from the water in the Peruman Rail Accident (July 1988).

== History ==
According to Keralatourism.org, history of Khalasis dates back to some 2000 years. Beypore was a timber outlet which attracted seafaring people, especially the Arabs. Eventually a naval vessel building industry developed in Beypore, their main job was constructing Arab trading dhows. Traditional Khalasi families hails from Beypore and Chaliyam. Sailors and merchants from European and Mediterranean countries sought the service of Khalasis for their craftsmanship. They use the principle of pulleys for moving Urus, using equipment such as pulleys, wooden rails, rollers, ropes, and hawsers. Beside Uru making, the skill set of Khalasis were also used in the construction of Idukki Dam, Feroke Bridge, Vadakkumbadu Bridge, and Mahanadi Bridge.

Some say that Uru making in Beypore is as old as the beginning of maritime trade with Mesopotamia. Dhows are called Urus in Beypore. Urus are perhaps the largest handicraft in the world. The art of Uru making is endemic to Beypore. Uru making is undocumented, it was passed down through generations through oral tradition and training. There are no build plans, sketches, drawings, or blueprints. From conception to completion, the designed is in the mind of the master carpenter or maistri of a yard, who assigns work to his assistants. The hull and the frame are made in a building yard while fitment of engine and customisation are done elsewhere. Urus traversed the Indian Ocean for spice and silk trade. In present-day, urus are built on order for Arabs and royalty in Middle East as luxury yachts and floating restaurants. Khalasis do not use any machinery.

Arabs were skilled in making wooden dhows. The early Arab traders arrived in the Malabar Coast for export of spices taught the local natives their craft so that they could build dhows at Beypore and transfer it to their land. Availability of superior quality teak from Nilambur could have been another reason why Arabs chose Beypore for construction of dhows, as there was a port and Chaliyar has deep waters. With the arrival of modern transport methods, Uru construction declined by 1970s and not a single Uru was built for the next 10 to 15 years.

Another interpretation says the word khalasi means black and white. Khalasis had Arab ancestry, they had Arab father and Malayali Malabari mother. The Arab trade with urus were popular in the medieval period. Khalasis were mainly populated in Beypore and also Chaliyam and at the shores of Chaliyar. Khalasis were employed for the construction of Indian Railway by the British.

As the Khalasis exert pressure on the handles with the accompaniment of their traditional work songs that fill the entire atmosphere with vigour and vitality the huge mass. Their skill also had been utilised for building the huge clock in the makkah royal clock tower which possesses the world record of tallest and largest clock in the world. The incredible skill of Khalasis was also used to winch out the bogies during some of the major train accidents in India.
