= Sunar =

Hindu and Sikh caste of goldsmiths in India

Sunar/Sonar
- Religions: Hinduism, Sikhism, Islam
- Region: India

The Sunar (alternately, Swarnkar, Soni, Sonar, Sonkar) is a caste in India. The Sunar community works as traders of gold or as goldsmiths. The community is primarily Hindu, Sikh, Muslim and found all over India.

== Etymology ==
The term Swarnkar may derive from the Sanskrit suvarna kār, "worker in gold".

The Swarnkar are still involved in their traditional occupation, that is being goldsmiths. There is however a steady process in taking up other occupations, and the community in Haryana and Punjab as whole is fairly successful, having produced several professionals.

== Social status ==
The Sunars are generally considered a part of Vaishya varna.

In the state of Haryana, Sunars are on the Other Backward Class list.

== Factions ==
The Sunars are divided into a large number of territorial and non-territorial groupings called Alla. Some of the major Alla are the Jhankhad, Santanpuriya, Lal Sultaniya, Dekhalantiya, Mundaha, Bhigahiya, Multhiya, Parajiya, Samuhiya, Chilliya, Katiliya Kalidarwa, Naubastwal, Berehele, Gedehiya, Shahpuriya, Mathureke Paliya, Katkaria, Nimkheriya and Vaibhaha. Each lineage is associated with a particular area from which its ancestors came. The Sunars use Soni, Swarnkar, Verma, Wadichar, Saraf, Shah, Sonik, Singh etc. as their surnames. In Gujarat and Rajasthan, the community is also known as Soni. In Haryana, the Sunars are often known as Swarnkar, Soni, Suri and Verma, are their common surname. In Sindh they are called Sonaro, In Punjab, Haryana and Rajasthan, the Mair community work as goldsmiths.

== Sunar in Nepal ==
Sunar (Sunar in the Nepal census) Sunar surname is used by khas of Nepal. And also use by subgroup within the broader social group of Madheshi Other Caste. At the time of the 2011 Nepal census, 64,335 people (0.2% of the population of Nepal) were Sunar.

== Notable members ==
- Raj Babbar Film Actor & Politician
- Gurpreet Singh, Artist is an internationally recognized painting artist.
- Parmish Verma Punjabi Singer & Performer
