= Shishupal Ram =

Indian pediatrician

- Born: Bihar, India
- Died: 29 October 2011; Patna, Bihar, India
- Occupation: Pediatrician
- Awards: Padma Shri

Shishupal Ram was an Indian pediatrician. Born in the Indian state of Bihar, he was a graduate of the Patna Medical College. The Government of India awarded him the fourth highest Indian civilian honour of Padma Shri in 1983. He died on 29 October 2011 at the age of 84.

== See also ==
- Pediatrics
