= Gopal Krishna Vishwakarma =

Indian physician and academician

- Born: 1 October 1934; Ghazipur, UP
- Died: 24 March 2004 (aged 69); New Delhi
- Occupation: Orthopaedic surgeon
- Spouse: Radha Vishwakarma

Gopal Krishna Vishwakarma, more popularly known as G K Vishwakarma, (1 October 1934 – 24 March 2004) was an Indian orthopedic surgeon, academician and public health administrator. He was the Director General of Health Services from October 1986 to his retirement in October 1992. He was awarded the Silver Jubilee Award (1983) and the Dr. B. C. Roy Award by Medical Council of India, The Government of India, in recognition of his contributions to the field of medicine and public health honored him with the Padma Shri (1985) one of India's highest civilian awards in India.

== Early life ==
G. K. Vishwakarma was born on 1 October 1934 in Ghazipur, UP.

== Education ==
After his early education in Ghazipur and Varanasi, Vishwakarma, went to King George Medical College (Lucknow) to complete his MBBS (1957) and MS (Orth) (1961). He was also an FICS, FIMSA (1987) and FAMS.

== Career ==
After completing his education Vishwakarma started working with the All India Institute of Medical Sciences, New Delhi as an Assistant Professor of Orthopaedic Surgery from 1963 to 1968. It was at the AIIMS that Vishwakarma started the Spinal Surgery Centre and performed for the first time in the country, Spinal Instrumentation in the surgical treatment of Scoliosis in 1963.

Vishwakarma then moved to the Goa Medical College, Goa, Mumbai University as the Professor and Head of the Department of Orthopaedic Surgery. It was in 1971 that he started the first modern Bone Bank in the country at the Goa Medical College.

From 1973 to 1977 Vishwakarma was the Professor and Head of Department of Orthopaedic Surgery at the Jundi Shahpur University, Iran. It was in 1973 itself he started the total joint replacement practice Jundi Shahpur University. He also pioneered the work in the reattachment of severe extremities at the university in 1973.

From 1977 to 1979 he was a Professor and Head of Department of Orthopaedic Surgery at the Maulana Azad Medical College, Chief Orthopaedic Surgeon in LNJP Hospital and GB Pant Hospital, New Delhi.

In 1979 he took over as the Director of the Central Institute of Orthopaedics, Safdarjung Hospital and Professor and Head of Orthopaedic Surgery, University College of Medical Sciences and Director, National Institute of Orthopaedics and Traumatology, Safdarjung Hospital. Vishwakarma started the Amniotic Orthoplasty in the treatment of tuberculosis of the hip at the Central institute of Orthopaedics, Safdarjung Hospital, New Delhi in 1980–1983. It was at the Central Institute of Orthopaedics, that Vishwakarma started research into Allogenic transplantation of bones and joints.

From 1983 to October 1986 he was, variously, the medical superintendent and consultant in Orthopaedics, Safdarjung Hospital and the Additional Director General of Health Services, Government of India.

He formally took over as the Director General of Health Services on 29 October 1986 and continued in the same position till his superannuation on 1 October 1992.

== Marriage and children ==
Vishwakarma is survived by his wife Radha and two sons Loveneesh G Krishna and Nirvan G Krishna. Loveneesh G Krishna is Director at the Central Institute of orthopedics and Vardhman Mahavir Medical College. Nirvan G Krishna is a Director at Prachar Media Solutions Private limited.

== Positions ==
- Director General of Health Services, Government of India – 1986 to1992
- Chairman – Tuberculosis Association of India (TAI)
- Honorary Orthopaedic surgeon to the President of India

== Research ==
Vishwakarma developed the technique of Amniotic Arthroplasty in Tubercular Hip in 1982 at the Central Institute of Orthopedics, Safdarjung Hospital.

== Awards ==
- Award for Meritorious Services – Jundi Shahpur University
- Silver Jubilee Award of the Medical Council of India 1983
- B. C. Roy Award for the Eminent Medical Person
- Padma Shri – 1985
