= Raj Baveja =

Indian gynecologist

- Born: 1934 (age 91–92); Lahore
- Occupations: Gynaecologist and Obstetrician
- Awards: Padma Shri

Raj Baveja (born 1934) is an Indian gynaecologist and obstetrician who served as professor and head of the department of obstetrics and gynaecology at Motilal Nehru Medical College. She received the Padma Shri in 1983.

== Early life and education ==
Baveja was born in 1934 in Lahore. Her father, Prabhudayal Baveja, was employed in government service. Following the partition of India in 1947, her family moved to Rohtak and later settled in Lucknow, where she continued her schooling. She studied science and qualified in the pre-medical test in 1952-53. She obtained an MBBS degree, a Diploma in Gynaecology and Obstetrics (DGO), and an MS in Obstetrics and Gynaecology. She also completed a PhD based on research into the human endometrium and extra-placental membranes.

== Career ==
Baveja began her medical career as a resident doctor at Gandhi Memorial Hospital, Lucknow, before joining the All India Institute of Medical Sciences, New Delhi, as a registrar. In 1966, she joined Motilal Nehru Medical College, Allahabad, as a lecturer in obstetrics and gynaecology. She became a reader in 1971 and was promoted to professor in 1974. She subsequently served as head of the department of obstetrics and gynaecology at the college and as director of the Kamala Nehru Postgraduate Institute, Allahabad.

In 1978, she established a postpartum programme at Sarup Rani Nehru Hospital, Allahabad, and become the first head of its postgraduate postpartum centre. She was also involved in teaching and training postgraduate doctors in obstetrics and gynaecology, including surgical techniques in the speciality.

Baveja served as honorary medical superintendent of Kamala Nehru Memorial Hospital, Allahabad. She participated in the World Health Organization's technical working-group meeting on care in normal birth and presented at the meeting, whose proceedings were published in 1996.

== Awards and recognition ==
- 1973 – Indumati Jhaveri Prize.
- 1983 – Padma Shri in Medicine.

== See also ==
- Pregnancy
- Child birth
- Microbiology
