= Sarbdeep Singh Virk =

Former Indian police official

- Born: Punjab, India
- Occupation: Police official
- Awards: Padma Shri

Sarbdeep Singh Virk is a former Indian police official and the erstwhile Director General of Police in the states of Punjab and Maharashtra. Passing the civil services examinations of 1970, he joined the Maharashtra cadre of the Indian Police Service and was sent, on deputation, to Punjab in 1984 when the Sikh insurgency in the state was at its zenith, exposing him to three unsuccessful attempts on his life. He worked in the state in different positions till 2007, eventually becoming the Director General of Police, when charges of corruption levelled against him forced the state government to suspend him from service.

Virk approached the Central Administrative Tribunal (CAT) against his suspension and got a favourable verdict, enabling him to join the Maharashtra state as the Director General of Police. He retired from service in October 2009 and lives in Chandigarh with family, under government security, due to the threats on his life. The Government of India awarded him the fourth highest civilian honour of Padma Shri in 1988. In May 2017, Punjab Vigilance Bureau submitted cancellation of the fake FIR registered against him for political reasons which the Hon'ble Court at Mohali accepted and discharged Mr. S S Virk of all false accusations.

== See also ==
- Punjab insurgency
