= Purushottam Das =

Indian musician (1907–1991)

- Born: July 7, 1907; Nathdwara

Purushottam Das (Born: 7 July 1907 – Died: 21 January 1991) was the pioneer of the Nathdwara school of Pakhawaj (a barrel-shaped, two-headed drum instrument usually played in the Indian subcontinent).

== Awards ==
- Padma Shri in 1984
