= K. P. Mathur =

Politician

- Born: India
- Occupation: Physician
- Known for: Personal physician to Indira Gandhi
- Awards: Padma Shri

Krishna Prasad Mathur is an Indian physician who was the personal physician to Indira Gandhi, the former prime minister of India. He was one of the last few people to meet her before the she was assassinated by Beant Singh and Satwant Singh on 31 October 1984.

The Government of India awarded him the fourth highest Indian civilian honour of Padma Shri in 1984.
