= V. Venkatachalam =

Indian linguist (1925–2002)

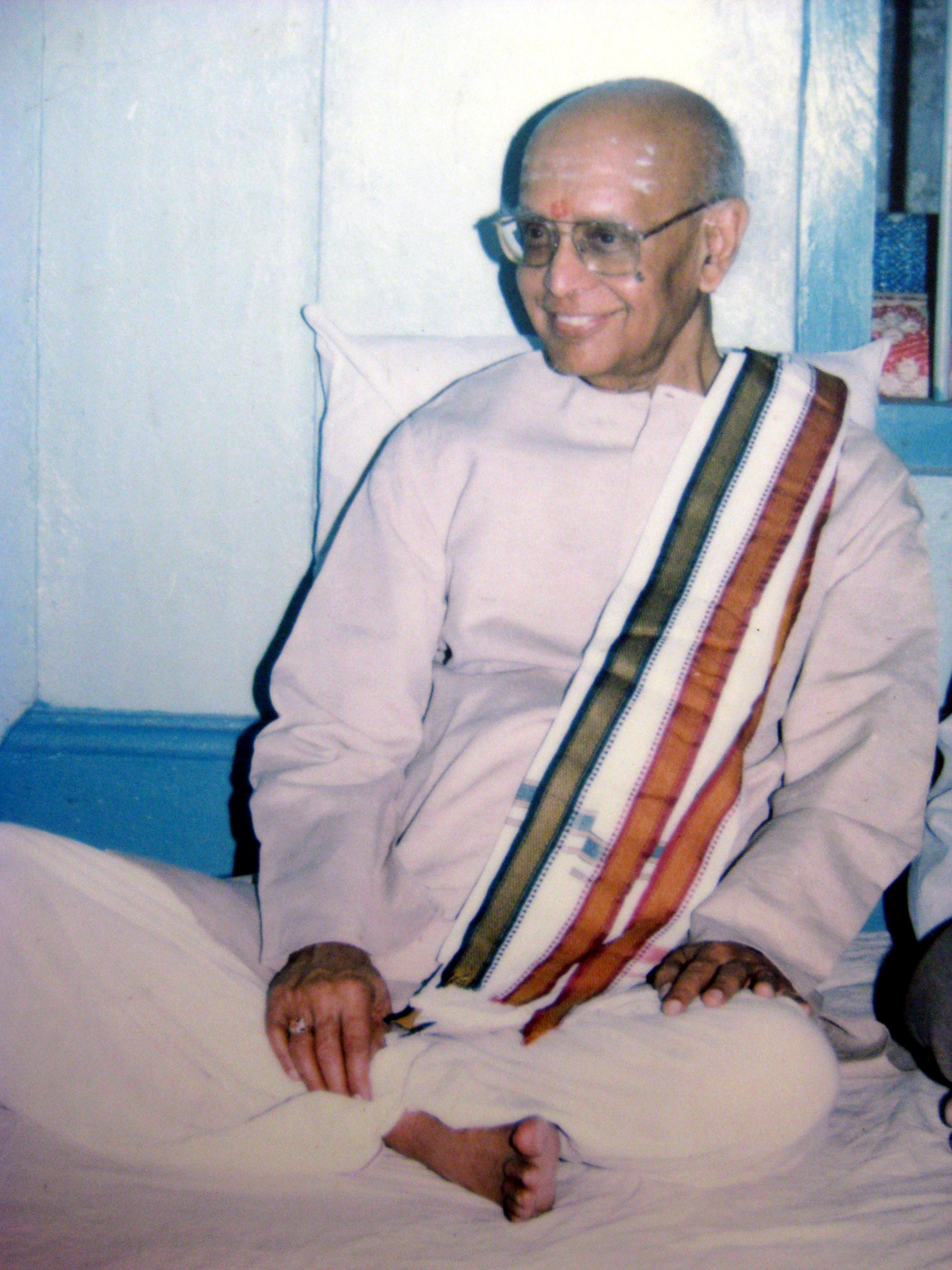
- Born: 7 July 1925; Kovilpatti, (Tirunelveli District now Thoothukudi district), Tamil Nadu
- Died: 7 June 2002 (aged 76); Chennai, Tamil Nadu
- Known for: Contribution to Sanskrit Literature
- Spouse: Smt. Gomathi Venkatachalam
- Awards: Padma Shri, 1989

Vishwanathan Venkatachalam (7 July 1925 – 7 June 2002) was an eminent Sanskrit scholar. He served as the vice-chancellor of Sampurnanand Sanskrit University, Varanasi, India for two terms. He was awarded the Padma Shri (National honour) in 1989 by the Government of India for his valuable contribution to the field of Sanskrit research and education.

== Early life and education ==
Vishwanathan Venkatachalam was born on 7 July 1925 in Kovilpatti, Tirunelveli (now Thoothukudi) district of Tamil Nadu . His father was a Head Master and mother a homemaker. In his early years, Venkatachalam won gold medals from Madras Sanskrit College and Sriperumbudur Sanskrit College; numerous book-prizes from St. Xaviers College and Madras Sanskrit College for competitions in areas including essays, elocution, declamation, and debate in Sanskrit as well as in English; book/cash prizes from institutions like Sanskrit Academy, Kuppuswami Sastri Research Institute, Theosophical Society and Ramakrishna Math of Chennai and an All India Essay Competition in English from Ramakrishna Math, Sorisha, West Bengal.

He acquired a dual Bachelor of Arts degree in Sanskrit and Mathematics from Madras University (1944). He was awarded the Sri Godayvari Sanskrit Prize by Madras University in B.A. (Sanskrit) exam. He was awarded the Pitti Muniswami Chetty Garu Gold Medal by Madras University for first rank in the Siromani exam with Advaita Vedanta as specialisation (1949). He went on to earn his Master of Arts Degree in Sanskrit (Classical Literature and Alankara as specialisations) from Nagpur University (1951). He was awarded the Daji Hari Wadegaonkar Gold Medal by Nagpur University for obtaining first position in M.A. (Sanskrit) exam. Prof. Venkatachalam was a polyglot well versed in Sanskrit, Hindi, English, Tamil and Malayalam. He earned a certificate in German from Vikram University, Ujjain in 1965.

== Career ==
Venkatachalam started his career in 1949 as a lecturer in Sanskrit at Vivekananda College, Madras. From 1954 to 1966 he served as Assistant Professor/Professor of Sanskrit in Madhav College, Ujjain, MP. In 1966 he was appointed Principal of Government College, Barwani (MP) and went on to be Reader and Head of Sanskrit Department at Vikram University, Ujjain, MP a year later. He was later appointed Principal of Government Post Graduate College, Shajapur, MP in 1972. He again moved to Vikram University, Ujjain, MP in 1974 to be Reader/Professor and Head of the Sanskrit Department till 1985. Concurrently he became the Director of Scindia Oriental Institute at Vikram University, Ujjain, MP. From 1986 to 1989 he was appointed vice-chancellor of Sampurnanand Sanskrit University, Varanasi, UP. After his term at Sampurnanand Sanskrit University, he was Director of Bhogilal Leherchand Institute of Idology in Delhi till 1992. He was invited to serve as the vice-chancellor of Sampurnanand Sanskrit University for a second term from 1992 to 1995. Concurrently he was also honorary Chancellor of Shri Lal Bahadur Shastri Sanskrit Vidyapeeth, New Delhi till 1997. From 1996 to 1998 he served as the vice-chancellor for Kameshwar Singh Darbhanga Sanskrit University, Darbhanga, Bihar. Concurrently, from 1997 onwards, he was the Chairman of the Indian Council of Philosophical Research, Ministry of Human Resource Development, Department of Education, Govt. of India. He served in the Board of Editors on Encyclopedia of Hinduism.

He visited and gave talks in many countries including Malaysia, Singapore, Italy, France, Germany, USA, UK, Bali (Indonesia), Nepal, South Africa, Curaçao (Netherlands Antilles), Trinidad & Tobago and Canada.

== Specialization ==
His fields of specialisation included Indian Philosophy, particularly Advaita Vedanta and Bhoja; Sanskrit literature and Literary Criticism and special study on Sankaracarya, Kalidasa and Bhoja.

== Research ==
Venkatachalam published about 100 research papers related to such different fields of Indology as Literature, Literary Criticism, Philosophy and Religion, History, Technical Sciences etc., in English, Sanskrit and Hindi. He has also contributed introductions to a large number of books and reviews.

For the year 1983–84, he was appointed National Lecturer in Sanskrit by UGC under their Annual National Lecturer Project. As a part of this project, he lectured in the Universities of Burdwan, Madras, Kerala and Puri (Sanskrit University). He also visited the Universities of Jadavpur, Calcutta and Osmania.

In 1962, he framed the project, "A New Approach to Kalidasa – a fresh appraisal of Kalidasa's works on the basis of canons of Western Literary Criticism". With financial assistance provided by the Vikram University, he delivered lectures on some of the canons in various universities/Oriental institutes of Baroda, Bombay, Poona, Tirupati, Bangalore, Calcutta, Santiniketan, Allahabad, Jaipur etc.

For a span of ten years, from 1970 to 1981, Venkatachalam spearheaded the planning of the Project of Research on the lost works of the polymath and patron of learning, Paramara King Bhoja (11th century). This project received the support of U.G.C.

== Books and publications ==
- A students' Handbook to Ratnavali of Sri Harsa, Madras, 1955. (pp. 3+228)
- Swarnapushpa/Sanskrit Pathya Pustak – Sanskrit Text Book for Higher Secondary Classes of Madhya Pradesh, Delhi, 1958. (pp. 8+186)
- Summaries of Papers submitted to the XXVI Session of the All India Oriental Conference, Ujjain, 1972 (Edited) (pp. 539)
- Bhasa (A monograph in the 'Indian Men of Letter Series'), Sahitya Akademi, New Delhi, 1986; Second Edn. 1994; (pp. 16+192) (Translated into Bengali, Gujarati, Kannada and Telugu-Pub. By Sahitya Akademi)
- Bhoja and India Learning (Ed.) – Proceedings of the UGC Seminar on Bhoja (pp. 300 approx). – Not yet released by Vikram University.
- Vividhavidyavicaracatura (Ed.) – editio princeps of a rare Dharmasastra Manual by Bhoja based on the only known manuscript from the National Archived on Nepal (Not yet released by Vikram University, Ujjain)
- Souvenir (Ed.) UGC Seminar in 'Scientific works of King Bhoja', 1–6 March 1982; 80 pages, Pub. School of Studies in Sanskrit, Vikram University, Ujjain, 1982
- Kalidasa Reflections. Pub. School of Studies in Sanskrit, Vikram University, Ujjain, 1982, pp. 140
- A descriptive Catalogue of Manuscripts in the Scindia Oriental Institute, Vikram University, Ujjain, Vol. II (Parts I and II), (Chief Editor).
- Vishva-drishti-Sampurnanand Birth Centenary Commemoration Volume, Vol. I (pp. 1–529), Vol. II (pp. 530–1021), Published by Sampurnanand Sanskrit University, Varanasi, 1993.
- Sankaracarya : The Ship of Enlightenment (Ed.), Sahitya Akademi, New Delhi, 1998

== Awards (Academic) and National Honours ==
- Certificate of Honour for Sanskrit Scholarship by President of India 1986.
- 'Padmashri' (National honour) by the President of India 1989.
- 'Mahamahopadhyaya' degree (honoris causa) by Rashtriya Sanskrit Vidyapeeth (Deemed University), Tirupathi at its Convocation on 28 December 1997
- 'Mahamahopadhyaya' degree (honoris causa) by Banaras Hindu University, Varanasi 2000
- Honoured with shawls etc. on different occasions by Jagadguru Shankaracharyas of Sringeri, Kanchi, Dwaraka, Badrinath, H. E. Governor of Rajasthan, Chief Minister of UP.
- Presented with Felicitation Addresses/Shawls etc. by numerous institutions.

== Death ==
Venkatachalam died on 7 June 2002.
