= Kundan =

Indian jewellery

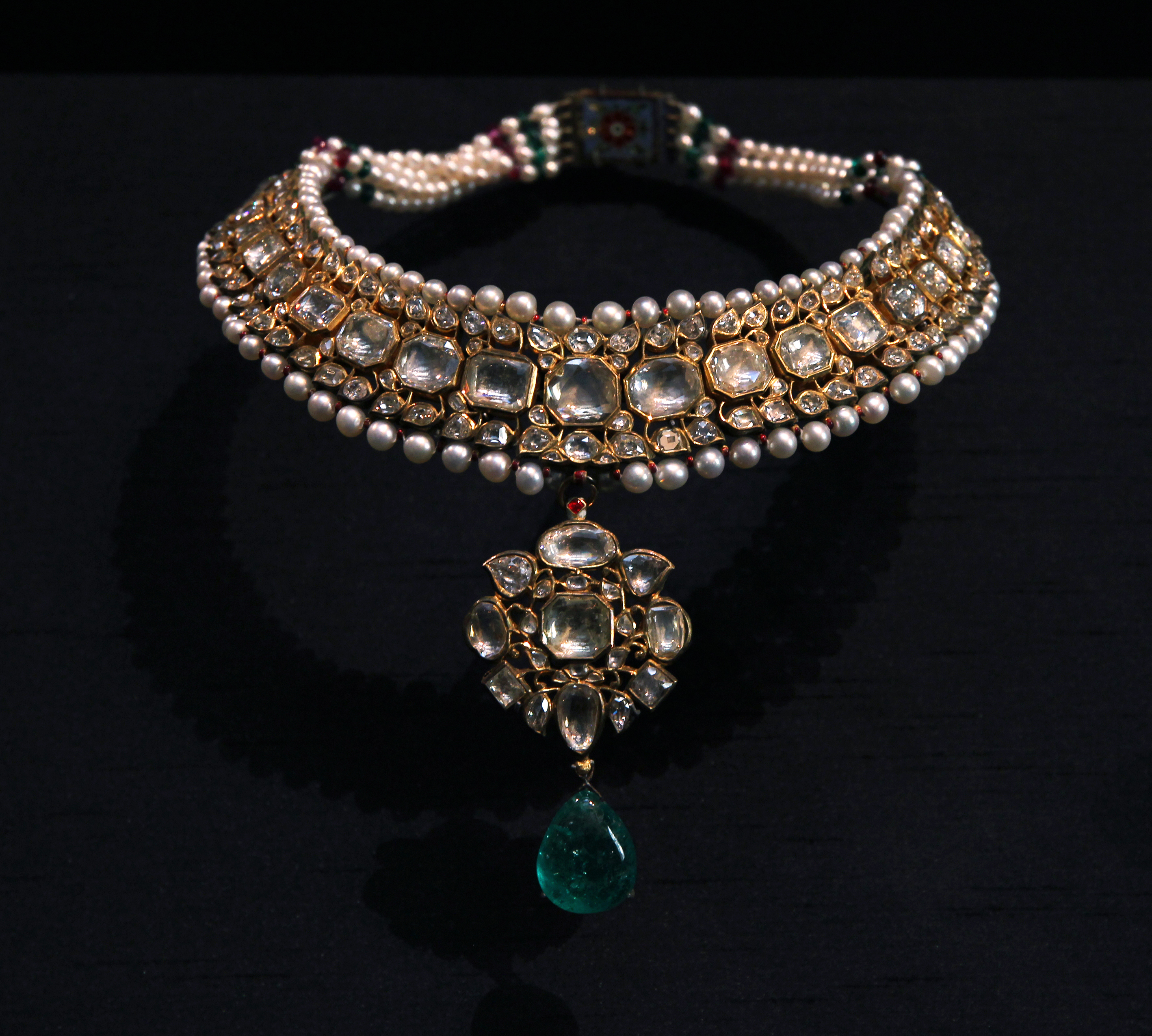

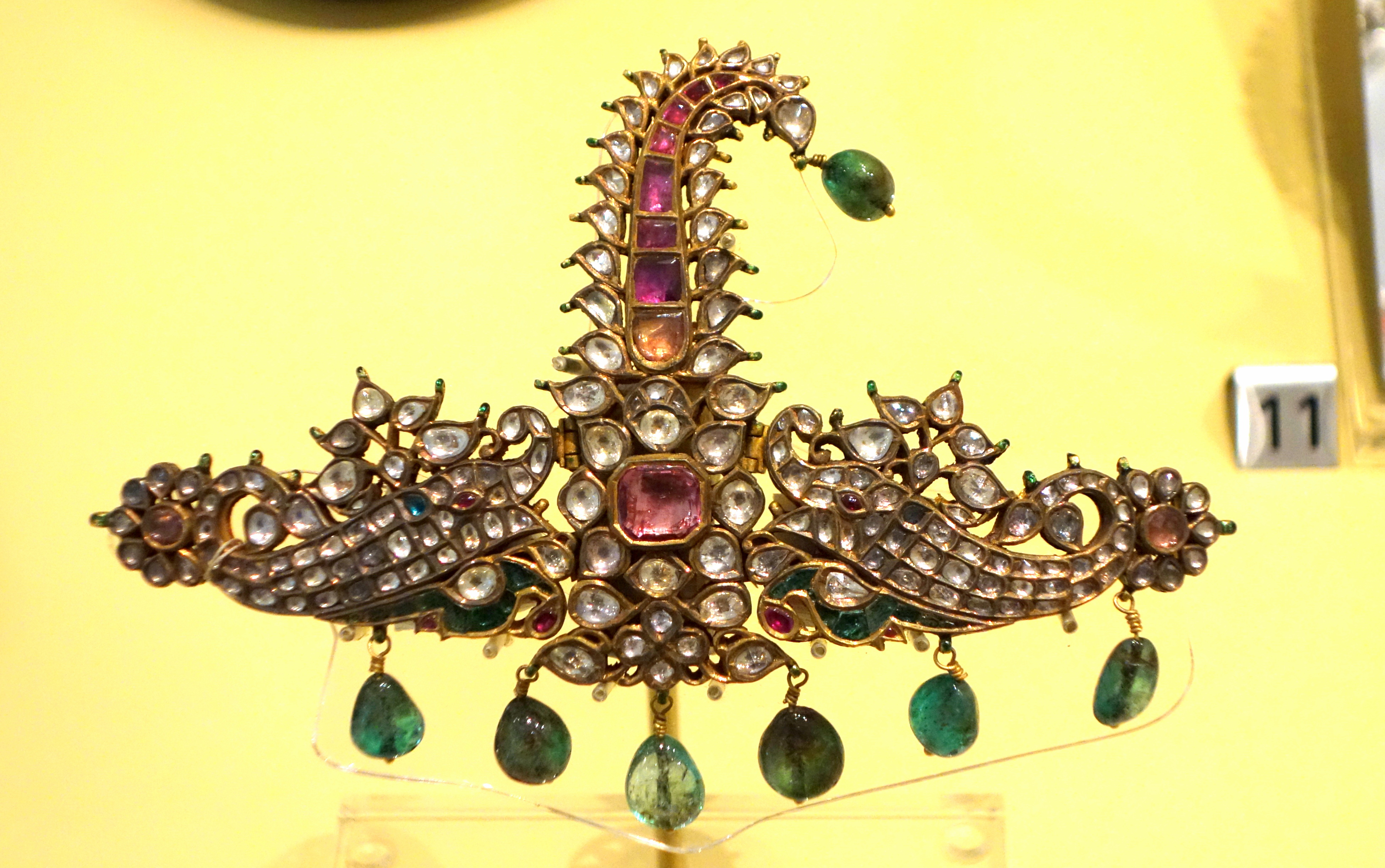

Kundan, meaning pure gold, is a traditional form of Indian gemstone jewellery involving a gem set with a gold foil between the stones and its mount, usually for elaborate necklaces and other jewellery.

== History ==
Origins of Kundan jewelleries in India are dated back to at least 3rd century BCE. Kundan started off in Rajasthan Royal court and then flourished under royal patronage during the Mughal era. Over the years, the Kundan jewellery of the courts was successfully copied in silver in Rajasthan, Bihar and the Punjab and became popular with the common man.

The method is believed to have originated in the royal courts of Rajasthan and Gujarat. It is one of the older forms of jewellery made and worn in India. The city of Jaipur in Rajasthan has traditionally been the centre for Kundan in India.

It remains an integral part of the traditional bridal wedding trousseau. Traditional settings, including the thappa and ras rawa, are experiencing a revival. In the 2008 film, Jodhaa Akbar, the lead character portrayed by Aishwarya Rai Bachchan was extensively shown wearing Kundan jewellery, highlighting its influence among Rajasthani royalty.

In 2006, "American Diamond" and Kundan jewellery contributed the largest share of both market value and volume (73 per cent) in the Indian jewellery market.

== Process ==
Kundan jewellery is created by setting carefully shaped, uncut diamonds and polished multicoloured gemstones into an exquisitely designed pure gold or faux metal base. The elaborate process begins with the skeletal framework called Ghaat. Thereafter, the Paadh procedure takes place, during which wax is poured onto the framework and moulded according to the design. Following this is the Khudai process, when the stones or uncut gems are fit into the framework. Meenakari then involves enameling to define the design details. Next, the Pakai process involves gold foils that hold the gems onto the framework; these are cold soldered using burnishing techniques. Finally, the gems are polished using the Chillai process.

== Gallery ==
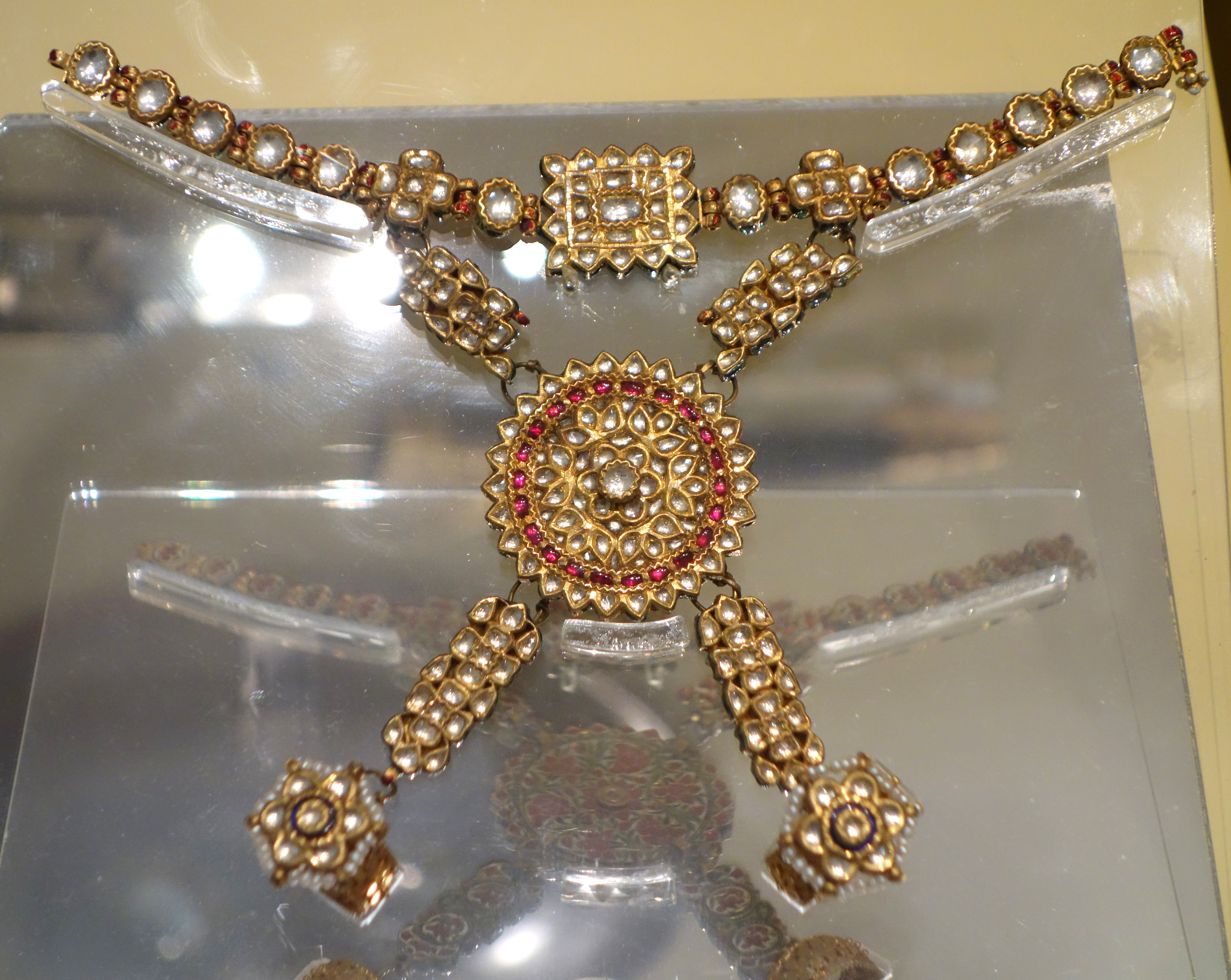

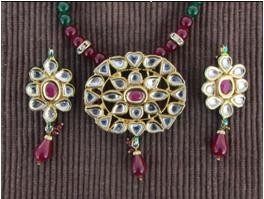

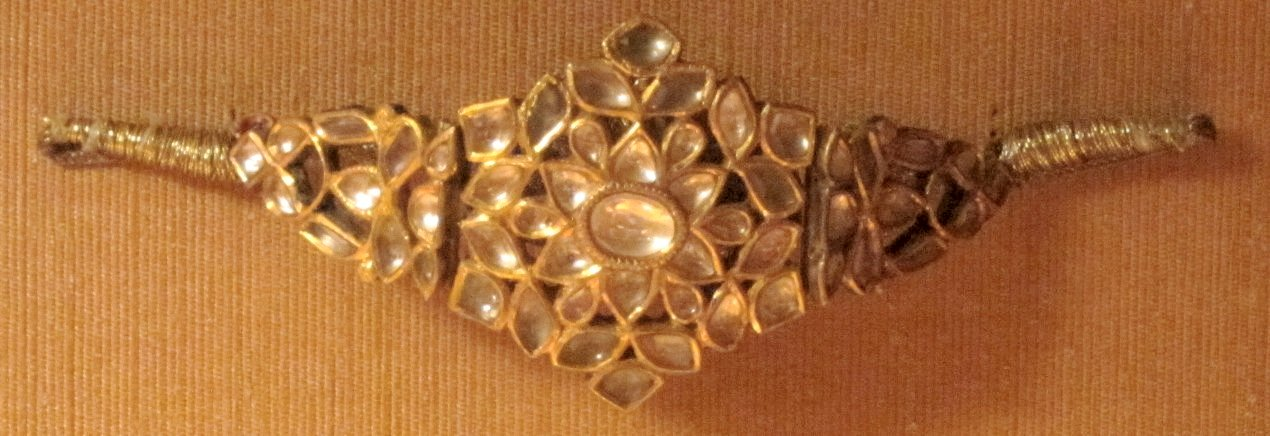

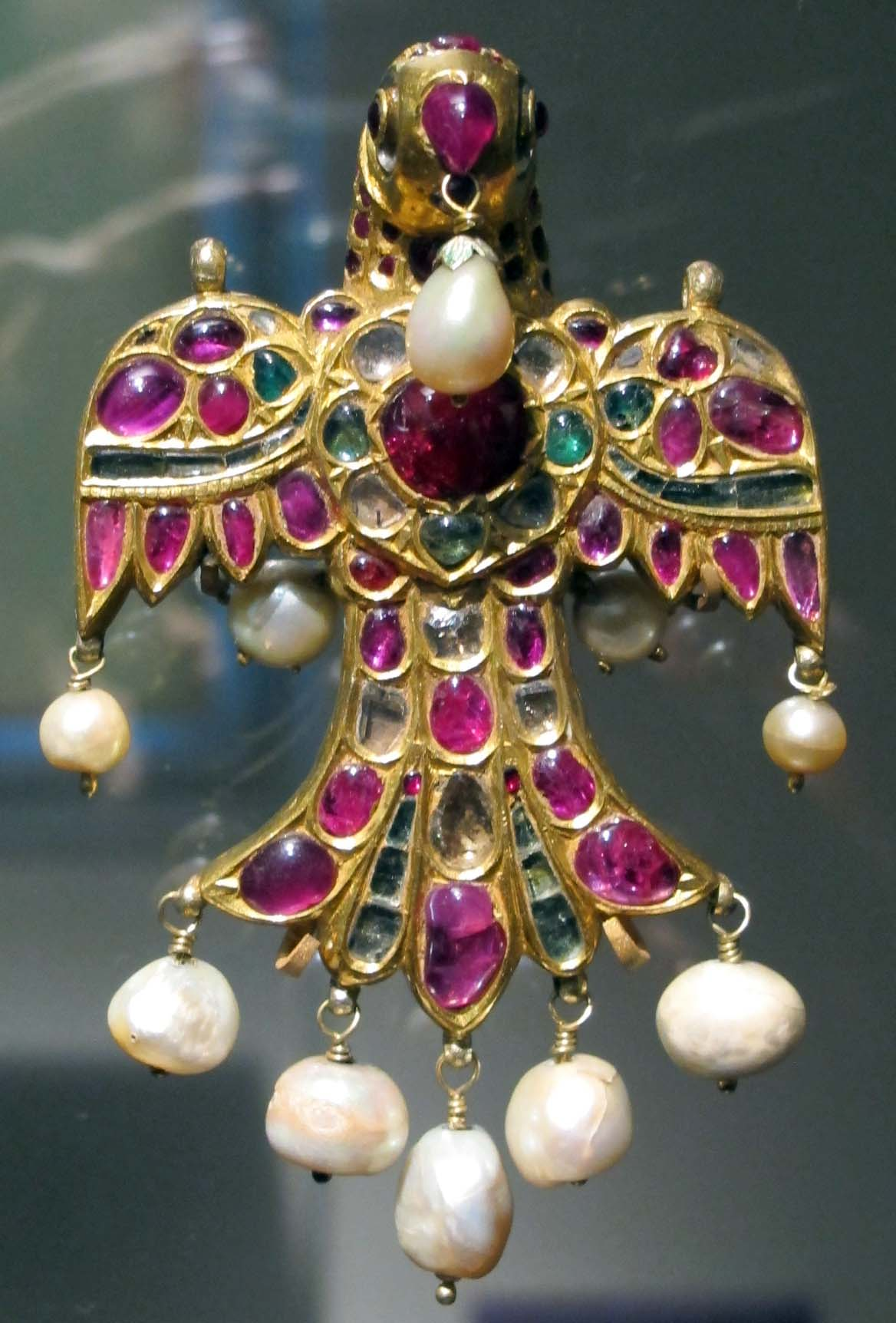

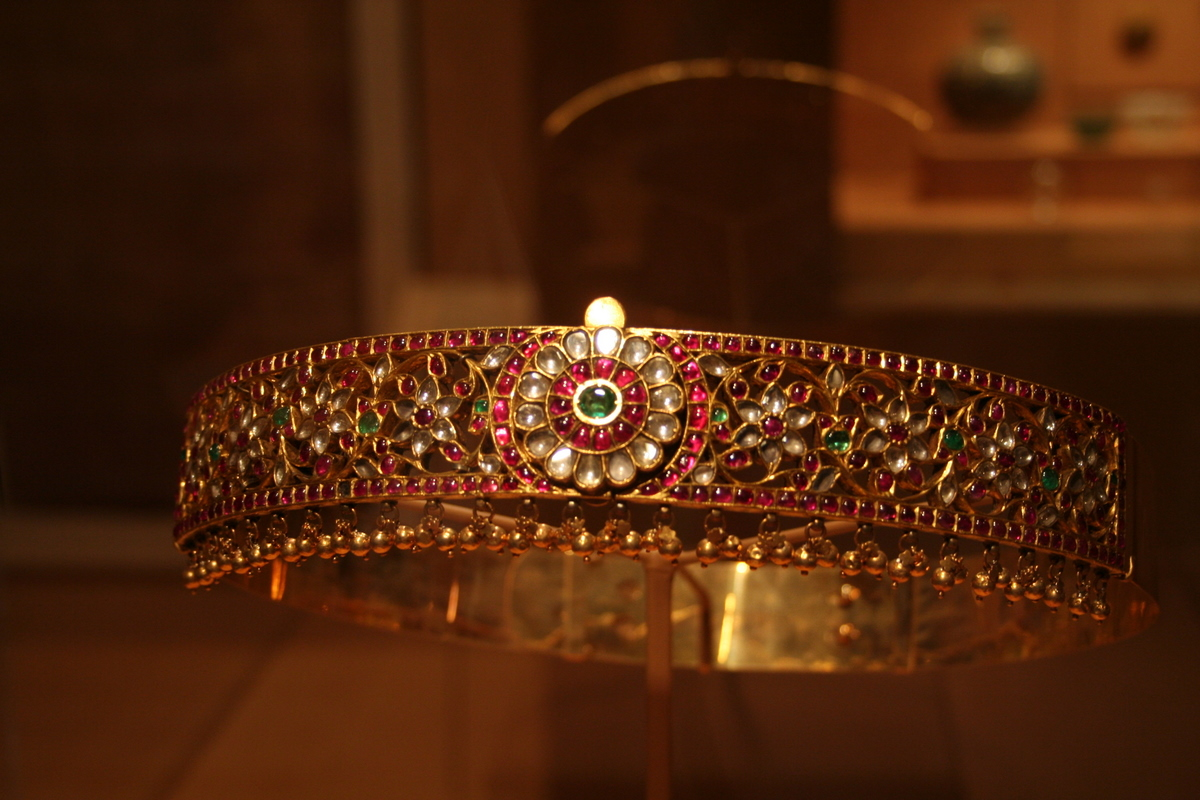
