= American Swimming Coaches Association =

The American Swimming Coaches Association, or ASCA, is a professional organization for Swimming coaches in the USA. It was founded in 1958 and is based in Fort Lauderdale, Florida.

ASCA provides education opportunities for swimming coaches, including running and participating at clinics both within and outside the US.

== Honors and awards ==
=== Hall of Fame ===
ASCA annually inducts selected coaches into its own Hall of Fame, as part of the annual ASCA World Clinic. Members of the ASCA Hall of Fame (and year of induction) are:

- Dave Armbruster (pre-2003)
- Buddy Baarcke (2016)
- Bill Bachrach (pre-2003)
- Ron Ballatore (2009)
- Peter Banks (2015)
- Red Barr (pre-2003)
- Jack Bauerle (2010)
- Dave Beaver (pre-2003)
- Paul Blair (2008)
- George Block (2011)
- Ernst Brandsten (pre-2003)
- Stan Brauninger (pre-2003)
- George Breen (2016)
- Bob Bowman (2010)
- Steve Bultman (2015)
- Harry Burke (pre-2003)
- Frank Busch (2008)
- Ray Bussard (2008)
- Fred Cady (pre-2003)
- Dades Center (pre-2003)
- Sherm Chavoor (pre-2003)
- Jim Clark (pre-2003)
- Jack Cody (pre-2003)
- John Collins (2006)
- Doc Counsilman (pre-2003)
- Peter Daland (pre-2003)
- Chris Davis (2015)
- Ray Daughters (pre-2003)
- Don Easterling (2004)
- Earl Ellis (2011)
- Jim Ellis (2019)
- Frank Elm (2004)
- Ray Essick (2015)
- Richard Fetters (2014)
- Jay Fitzgerald (2012)
- Jean Freeman (2011)
- Johnny Galvich (pre-2003)
- Don Gambril (pre-2003)
- Bob Gillett (2009)
- Bob Groseth (2013)
- George Haines (pre-2003)
- L. Deb. Handley (pre-2003)
- Dick Hannula (2004)
- Jerry Holtrey (2010)
- Karen Moe Humphreys (2012)
- Richard Jochums (2004)
- Frank Keefe (2005)
- Skip Kenney (2005)
- Don LaMont (2008)
- Gene Lee (pre-2003)
- John Leonard (2015)
- Peter Malone (2009)
- Matt Mann (pre-2003)
- David Marsh (2010)
- John Mattos (2019)
- Bud McAllister (2007)
- Kathy McKee (2019)
- Teri McKeever (2014)
- Charlie McCaffrey (pre-2003)
- George McMillion (2005)
- Bob Miller (2011)
- Harold Minto (pre-2003)
- Jim Montrella (2005)
- Phil Moriarty (2009)
- Pete Morgan (2014)
- Pete Motekaitis (2018)
- Jack Nelson (2009)
- Richard Papenguth (pre-2003)
- Mike Parratto (2019)
- Bill Peak (2007)
- Mike Peppe (pre-2003)
- Clarence Pinkston (pre-2003)
- Dennis Pursley (2006)
- Richard Quick (2003)
- Eddie Reese (2003)
- Randy Reese (2003)
- Jack Ridley (2012)
- Chuck Riggs (2018)
- Jim Riley Sr. (pre-2003)
- Tom Robinson (pre-2003)
- Bill Rose (2004)
- Dave Salo (2010)
- Soichi Sakamoto (pre-2003)
- Charles Sava (pre-2003)
- Walt Schlueter (pre-2003)
- Mark Schubert (2003)
- Maureen Sheehan (2019)
- Dick Shoulberg (2009)
- Charles Silvia (pre-2003)
- Jack Simon (2007)
- Ed Solotar (2005)
- Don Sonia (2012)
- Ed Spencer (2018)
- Mary Freeman Kelly Spitzer (2008)
- Gus Stager (pre-2003)
- Bob Steele (2016)
- Murray Stephens (2006)
- Don Swartz (2013)
- Penny Taylor (2013)
- Nort Thornton Sr. (pre-2003)
- Nort Thornton Jr. (2003)
- Stan Tinkham (pre-2003)
- Gregg Troy (2012)
- Jon Urbanchek (2004)
- Gregg Wilson (2018)
- Jim Wood (2011)
- Ray Woods (2016)

=== Coach of the Year ===
Beginning in 1961, ASCA has annually award a Coach of the Year honor to "the individual whose coaching effective has contributed most toward American swimming excellence" on the international level. Beginning in 2015, the award was re-named the George Haines Coach of the Year award.

Year	Coach	for work with...
1961	Doc Counsilman	
1962	Peter Daland	
1963	Dick Smith	
1964	George Haines	
1965	Don Gambril	
1966	George Haines	
1967	George Haines	
1968	Sherm Chavoor	
1969	Jim Montrella	
1970	Don Watson	
1971	Jim Montrella	
1972	George Haines	
1973	Bob Miller	
1974	Dick Jochums	
1975	Mark Schubert	
1976	Mark Schubert	
1977	Paul Bergen	
1978	Paul Bergen	
1979	Randy Reese	
1980	Dennis Pursley	Mary T. Meagher
1981	Mark Schubert	
1982	Dick Shoulberg	
1983	John Collins	Rick Carey
1984	Randy Reese	
1985	Nort Thornton	Matt Biondi
1986	Richard Quick	
1987	Bud McAllister	Janet Evans
1988	Bud McAllister	Janet Evans
1989	Dick Shoulberg	
1990	Jon Urbanchek	
1991	Eddie Reese	
1992	Richard Quick	
1993	Skip Kenney	
1994	honor removed	
1995	Jon Urbanchek	Tom Dolan, Michigan's Men's NCAA title
1996	Murray Stephens	
1997	Mark Schubert	
1998	Richard Quick	
1999	Richard Quick	
1999	Mark Schubert	
2000	Peter Banks	Brooke Bennett
2001	Bob Bowman	Michael Phelps
2002	Teri McKeever	Natalie Coughlin
2003	Bob Bowman	Michael Phelps
2004	Eddie Reese	Aaron Peirsol, Brendan Hansen, Ian Crocker
2005	Eddie Reese	Aaron Peirsol, Brendan Hansen, Ian Crocker
2006	Eddie Reese	Aaron Peirsol, Brendan Hansen, Ian Crocker
2007	Bob Bowman	
2008	Bob Bowman	
2009	Eddie Reese	
2010	Gregg Troy	Ryan Lochte, Florida's Women's NCAA title
2011	Gregg Troy	Ryan Lochte
2012	Bob Bowman	Michael Phelps, Allison Schmitt
2013	Bruce Gemmell	Katie Ledecky
2014	Bruce Gemmell	Katie Ledecky
2015	Bruce Gemmell	Katie Ledecky
2016	Dave Durden	Nathan Adrian, Anthony Ervin, Ryan Murphy, Josh Prenot
2017	Ray Looze	Lilly King
2018	Greg Meehan	Katie Ledecky
2019	Mike Parratto	Regan Smith
2020		No Award Given
2021	Gregg Troy	
2022	Anthony Nesty	University of Florida Swim Teams
2023	Dave Durden	Jack Alexy, Dare Rose, Destin Lasco, Ryan Murphy, Abbey Weitzeil, Hunter Armstrong
2024	Anthony Nesty	USA Olympic swimming team
2025	Todd DeSorbo	

== See also ==
- British Swimming Coaches Association
