= Judy Melick =

American swimmer (born 1954)

- Melick in 1972

Personal information
- Full name: Judith Ellen Melick
- Nickname: "Judy"
- National team: United States
- Born: June 4, 1954 (age 72) Summit, New Jersey, U.S.
- Height: 5 ft 6 in (1.68 m)
- Weight: 126 lb (57 kg)

Sport
- Sport: Swimming
- Strokes: Breaststroke
- Club: Central Jersey Aquatic Club
- College team: Rutgers University
- Coach: Frank Elm

Judith Ellen Melick (born June 4, 1954) is an American former competition swimmer who swam with the Scarlet Jets Swim Club, and Rutgers University under Coach Frank Elm and swam the 100-meter breaststroke event as part of the U.S. team at the 1972 Summer Olympics.

== Early education and swimming ==
Melick was born to George and Florence Melick on June 4, 1954, in Summit, New Jersey. Both of Melick's parents would serve on the Rutger's University faculty. Judy came from a swimming family with sisters Karen and Linda and brother Bob all swimming and competing. A 1972 graduate of Rutgers Preparatory School, she attended Franklin Township High during her Freshman and Sophomore years.

Judy began swimming in an easy program with the New Brunswick YMCA around 1963 with both sisters, and in the Fall of 1968, she and sister Karen began competition in earnest with Coach Frank Elm's Scarlet Jets Swim Club, an outstanding AAU team. In the summers of 1968 and 1969, Judy swam with the Rutgers University Swimming Association Team. Diverse in her stroke skills, Melick set a New Jersey State record in the 100-yard backstroke of 1:12.6, at the New Jersey AAU Senior Women's Championship, breaking the old record by half a second.

== 1972 Olympics ==
On August 5, 1972, at the Olympic trials in Chicago, despite formerly being ranked 37th in the 100 breaststroke, Melick won a place on the U.S. team by placing third in the 100-meter event with a personal best time of 1:16.64, only 2.5 seconds off the World Record. She and her coach were quite pleased with her time. From August 7-August 20, she trained intensively with the United States team at the University of Tennessee in preparation for the Olympics partly under the direction of her Coach Frank Elm, who helped outline a training plan.

After a reception at the White House, Melick travelled with the U.S. team around August 20, to represent the United States at the 1972 Summer Olympics in Munich. She may have received some coaching from Don Gambril who was a U.S. Olympic Assistant Coach that year, and highly experienced coaching women.

She swam the breaststroke leg for the gold medal-winning U.S. team in the preliminary heats of the women's 4×100-meter medley relay, but was ineligible to receive a medal under the 1972 rules because she did not compete in the event final. Individually, she also competed in the women's 100-meter breaststroke, finishing fifth in the event final with a time of 1:16.34.

== Swimming for Rutgers ==
Beginning in the Fall of 1972, Melick attended Rutgers University in New Brunswick, New Jersey, where she became the first female swimmer to receive an athletic scholarship. She competed for the Rutgers Scarlet Knights swimming and diving team, even before the university had formed its separate women's swimming team, training and traveling with the men's team before becoming the first captain of the women's swimming team when it was established in 1976. In 1975, Melick captured All-American honors in the 100-yard breaststroke while still competing with the men's team. In 1976, Melick was the first person to be awarded the Rutgers Outstanding Senior Female Athlete (Headley-Singer) Award. In both the 1975 and 1976 seasons, Rutgers newly formed women's swim team were undefeated in regular season meets at 20-0 and in 1976 were champions of the Eastern AIAW for Women. Melick was second at the AIAW meet in the 100 breaststroke and earned a second place on the 200 and 400 medley relays.

Rutger's Head swim Coach was Frank Elm, with whom Melick had been coached since 1968 when she swam for Elm's Scarlet Jets Swim Club, an AAU team. In the early 1970's the team became known as the Central Jersey Aquatic Club under Head Coach Bill Palmer.

== Honors ==
At Rutgers, in her Freshman year in 1973, Melick became the first women in any sport to earn a varsity letter and was voted the Central New Jersey Home News Athlete of the Year. She was a 1994 inductee into Rutgers University Sports Hall of Fame, and was the first person to be awarded the Rutgers Outstanding Senior Female Athlete (Headley-Singer) Award in 1976.

She later graduated from Harvard Medical School. In 1982, she was an Ophthalmology Resident at the Wills Eye Hospital and competed with United States Masters swimming when time permitted.

== See also ==
- List of Rutgers University people
