= Cincinnati Marlins =

USA Swimming Club in Cincinnati, Ohio

- Founded: 1961
- League: USA Swimming, Ohio LSC
- Based in: Finneytown, Ohio
- Arena: Keating Natatorium, St. Xavier High School
- Colors: Blue & Red
- President: Steven Connock
- Head coach: Brandon Voorhies; Matt Harrison (Sycamore Site Lead); Hailey Olson (NKU Site Lead)
- Mascot: Marlin
- Website: cincy-marlins.com

The Cincinnati Marlins are a non-profit, USA Swimming–affiliated swim team based in Cincinnati, Ohio, United States, serving Cincinnati, Northern Kentucky and Southeast Indiana. Founded in 1961, the team competes at the elementary school, high school, and college levels.

The Marlins operate three training facilities: Northern Kentucky University using the NKU Campus Recreation Center, Lawrenceburg High School, and its headquarters at Keating Natatorium on the campus of St. Xavier High School in Finneytown, Ohio. The organization was designated a Gold Medal Club by USA Swimming 2006 - 2008 but no longer has that recognition. It is designated a Level 4 club, which is the highest level attainable in the USA Swimming's Club Recognition Program in 2008.

== Facilities ==
Keating Natatorium at St. Xavier High School is a 50-meter indoor facility which can be divided into two 25-yard pools. Keating has seating capacity for over 700 spectators and is the site of many USA Swimming and High School meets and championships. Marlins Central swimmers train at this facility.

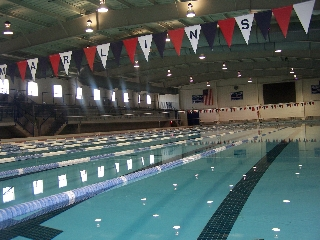
Keating Natatorium, used by the Cincinnati Marlins for training and hosting swim meets

Marlins South swimmers train at Northern Kentucky University using the Campus Recreation Center.

== History ==
The Cincinnati Marlins swim team was founded in 1961. Eighty-nine girls were selected for the team the first year, with seventy-seven boys joining the following year. For many years the team was known as the Cincinnati "Pepsi" Marlins, in recognition of the Pepsi-Cola Company's initial donation of $1,000 to the team. In their first decade, the Marlins practiced at Aiken and Courter Technical high schools, but these borrowed facilities could not accommodate the team as it grew to more than 200 swimmers. Their current home facility, Keating Natatorium, was built in 1969. It is named after Charles Keating, Sr. The Marlins and Keating Natatorium host approximately 20 swimming competitions a year.

The Marlins have placed a swimmer on every Olympic Team from 1968 - 2004. Team members have broken numerous National Record and World Records. In 1980 the team captured the United States National Championship. That year, six Marlins’ swimmers were named to the U.S. Olympic team, more than from any other team. The Olympic tradition carries on to today where two Marlins represented the United States in the 2000 Sydney Olympics and the 2004 Athens Olympics. Six former Marlins coaches have been named to Olympic Coaching Staffs. The team was named Junior National Team Champions in 1983, 84, 97,98,99, and 2000. In 2005, the Men’s team placed first, the combined team second. Swimming World Magazine named the Cincinnati Marlins 1999’s Best Age-Group Team in America.

Significant achievements include: · 1980 National Team Champions · 23 Olympic Medals · 15 World Records · 19 American Records · 60 National Champions · 6 American Swimmers of the Year

== Notable alumni ==
The Marlins have been home to many accomplished swimmers, including 25 Olympic qualifiers. Together, they have won 23 Olympic medals.

- Lisa Buese – silver medalist at the 1979 Pan American Games
- Deena Deardurff – gold medalist at the 1972 Summer Olympics and silver medalist at the 1973 World Aquatics Championships
- Nate Dusing – silver medalist at the 2000 Sydney Summer Olympics and bronze medalist at the 2004 Athens Summer Olympics
- Stephanie Elkins – gold medalist at the 1978 World Aquatics Championships and 1979 Pan American Games
- Jerry Frentsos – gold medalist at the 1987 Pan American Games
- Gary Hall, Sr. – silver medalist at the 1968 Mexico City and 1972 Munich Summer Olympics and bronze medalist at the 1976 Montreal Summer Olympics
- Paul Hove – bronze medalist at the 1975 World Aquatics Championships
- Joe Hudepohl – gold medalist at the 1992 Barcelona and 1996 Atlanta Summer Olympics
- Charles Keating, Jr. – 1946 NCAA swimming champion
- Jennifer Kemp - 1972 Olympic gold medalist
- Dan Ketchum – gold medalist at the 2004 Athens Summer Olympics
- Mary T. Meagher – gold medalist at the 1984 Los Angeles Summer Olympics and bronze medalist at the 1988 Seoul Summer Olympics
- Betsy Mitchell – silver medalist at the 1984 Los Angeles and 1988 Seoul Summer Olympics
- Erin Phenix – gold medalist at the 2000 Sydney Summer Olympics and silver medalist at the 2001 World Aquatics Championships
- Kim Rhodenbaugh – silver medalist at the 1982 World Aquatics Championships and bronze medalist at the 1983 Pan American Games
- Dave Wilson – gold medalist at the 1984 Los Angeles Summer Olympics
- Janelle Bosse - 1987 NCAA Champion 400 IM, Ohio State University Hall of Fame inductee

== Notable staff ==
- Skip Kenney (1977–79) – Head swimming coach, Stanford Cardinal, and inductee to the International Swimming Hall of Fame
- Jay Fitzgerald - (1981-85) - Head swimming coach, Pine Crest, and American Swim Coaches Association’s Hall of Fame in 2012
- Bob Bowman - (1990-91) - Olympic Coach and head coach of University of Texas, Inductee to International Hall of Fame
- Frank Busch - (1979-1980) - Head coach University of Cincinnati, and Arizona, Inductee to ASCA Hall of Fame
- Jack Simon - (1991-92) - International Swim coach, Inductee to International Hall of Fame
- Dennis Pursley - (1979-81) - 1980 Olympic Coach and Head Coach, University of Alabama, Inducted into the American Swimming Coaches Hall of Fame in 2006
- Chuck Warner - (1985-88) - Head swimming coach, Rutgers, and inductee to International Swimming Hall of Fame
- Charlie Hickcox - (1973-76) - Olympic Coach and World Record Holder, Inductee to International Hall of Fame
- Paul Bergen - (1970-72) - Head swimming coach, University of Texas, and inductee to International Swimming Hall of Fame as an Honor Coach in 1988
