= Elliot Chenaux =

Puerto Rican swimmer and academic (born 1947)

Personal information
- Born: April 11, 1947 (age 79) Honolulu, Hawaii
- Height: 173 cm (5 ft 8 in)
- Weight: 67 kg (148 lb)

Sport
- Sport: Swimming
- Strokes: freestyle, breaststroke, medley
- College team: Rutgers University
- Coach: Frank Elm (Rutgers)
Medal record
Representing Puerto Rico
Central American and Caribbean Games
Gold medal – first place	1966 San Juan	4x100m freestyle relay

Elliot Chenaux (born April 11, 1947) is a former academic and competitive swimmer for Rutgers University who competed with the Puerto Rican team in the 1964 Summer Olympics. He also swam for Puerto Rico in the Pan American Games in São Paulo in 1963 and in Winnipeg in 1967.

== Swimming for Rutgers ==
Chenaux swam for Rutgers University under Hall of Fame Coach Frank Elm, and was in the class of 1968. Swimming for Rutgers in an opening meet against Columbia in December 1966, Chenaux won the 200 breaststroke with a time of 2:27.2, and was on a winning 400 medley relay team. In 1967, showing stroke diversity, he broke the Rutgers school record in the 200-yard Individual Medley with a time of 2:04.8. On February 11, 1967, swimming for Rutgers, he set a pool record of 5:11.3 in the 500 freestyle.

== 1964 Tokyo Olympics ==
Though he did not swim in the Olympic finals, Chenaux swam in the preliminary heats of the 1500-meter freestyle, the 200-meter back and breaststroke events, and the 400-meter Individual Medley, a signature event where he had his best finish placing 21st with a 5:11.3, about 10 seconds behind Gold medal finalist Dick Roth of the United States. Elliot's brother Robert competed for Puerto Rico in the 1960 Olympics in the 400-meter freestyle.

== Later education and career ==
After completing a bachelor's degree in philosophy and a doctorate in Hispanic Languages and Literature from St. Louis University, Chenaux moved in 1976 to Corpus Christi where he worked as a faculty member at Texas A&M University–Corpus Christi, beginning as a Spanish professor around 1981. Moving from his initial role as an assistant professor of Spanish in 1981, he advanced to a position as the dean of students, and then served as the Vice President for Student Affairs. He retired in 2014.

Staying active in the athletic community, in late June, 1989, Chenaux conducted a seminar in swimming at the Corpus Christi Athletic Club.
