= George McMillion =

American swimmer and coach (1932–2017)

Biographical details
- Born: 1932
- Died: November 7, 2017 (aged 85)
- Education: SMU

Playing career
- 1950–1954: SMU
- Position: Backstroke

Coaching career (HC unless noted)
- 1957–1971: Asst. Coach SMU
- 1971–1988: Head Coach SMU
- '78, '82, '83: U.S. National Team Coach

Head coaching record
- Overall: 160 W- 39 L.75 Win % (SMU)

Accomplishments and honors

Championships
- 1971–79 (8 SWC Championships at SMU)

Awards
- '71 Collegiate and Scholastic Swim. Trophy: '72, '76, '77, '84 SWC Coach of the Year; '73 NCAA District 6 Coach of the Year; 2005 American Swim. Coaches Hall of Fame; 2009 Texas. Swimming Hall of Fame; 2011 SMU Athletic Hall of Fame; 2014 SWC Hall of Fame

George "Coach Mac" McMillion (1932–2017) was an American former All-American competition swimmer for Southern Methodist University, and a Hall of Fame collegiate swim coach who directed the Southern Methodist swim team for seventeen years from 1971–1988, after serving as Assistant Coach for fourteen years. McMillion led the Mustangs to eight Southwestern Conference Championships and an NCAA second-place finish in 1983.

Born in 1932 in Coffeyville, Kansas, to Dr. John D. & Mattie McMillion, he swam for Coffeyville's Field Kinley High School under Coach Johnny Charlesworth, where he graduated in 1950. Charlesworth's F. Kinley High School team, sometimes referred to as Coffeyville High School, were state champions in McMillion's Junior and Senior years and McMillion co-captained the team in his Senior year, when he swam a 2:22.7 in the 220-yard freestyle in state record time. By February 1950, McMillion's Field Kinley High School had 28 consecutive dual meet victories. On July 30, 1949, he placed third and qualified in the 100-meter backstroke for the widely attended Sooner Open Swim Meet.

== Swimming for SMU ==
McMillion, who swam for SMU prior to serving as coach, was team captain in 1954. During his years on the team, he captured seven Southwest Conference individual championships and was undefeated in the backstroke event during the three years he lettered. He held conference records in the 100 and 200-yard backstroke. Swimming for Coffeyville Swim Club during a summer break on June 29, 1952, McMillion scored 25 points helping his team win the Men's Division at the annual Sooner State Swim Meet.

As a highpoint during his SMU swimming career, at the Southwestern Conference Championships on March 22, 1952, at College Station, he set two conference records, including one in the 100-yard backstroke of 1:02.3. He was also the individual high scorer at the meet.

After college, he served as a lieutenant in the U.S. Army Air Force for two years and taught in the Dallas Public School system before coming to SMU as an Assistant Coach in 1957.

== Coaching ==
McMillion was SMU Head Coach from 1971 to 1988, after acting as Assistant Coach from 1957 to 1971 under renowned SMU Coach Red Barr. One of McMillion's Assistant coaches from 1971 through 1975 was former SMU swimmer Richard Quick, who would become a Hall of Fame Coach himself. McMillion mentored 78 All-Americans and 15 NCAA Champions, leading his teams to 14 NCAA top-10 finishes. He served as Meet Director of the 1972 and 1974 National AAU Swimming Championships.

In one of McMillion's best years, his SMU swim team had an undefeated season of 16–0 in 1979. Demonstrating consistent performance in their conference, McMillion's teams had eight consecutive Southwestern Conference Championships between 1971–1979.

He was a U.S. National Team coach in 1978, 1982 and 1983.

McMillion coached NCAA champions Steve Lundquist, Jerry Heidenreich, Ron Mills, Ricardo Prado, and Mook Rhodenbaugh. Ron Mills was a 1968 Olympic medalist, Jerry Heidenreich was a 1972 Olympian and medalist, while Steve Lundquist, Ricardo Prado, and Richard Saeger were 1984 Olympic medalists.

== Honors ==
He was the recipient of the Southwest Conference “Coach of the Year” honors in 1972, 1976, 1977 and 1984, and was named NCAA District Six “Coach of the Year” in 1973. In 1978, he received the “Big D” Award from the Dallas All-Sports Association. In 1971, he was a recipient of the prestigious Collegiate and Scholastic Swimming Trophy, presented to a Coach who in the belief of his peers in the swimming community, "has contributed in an outstanding way to swimming as a competitive sport and healthful recreational activity." He became a member of the SMU Athletics Hall of Fame in 2011, the Southwest Conference Hall of Fame in 2014 and the Texas Swimming and Diving Hall of Fame in 2009.

McMillion died surrounded by family in Richardson, Texas on November 7, 2017. He was survived by his wife Jean McMillion, and his three children: Stan McMillion, Robin McMillion Eiland & husband Bill, and Jan McMillion Mansfield and husband Mark. He had 9 grandchildren.
