= Barbara Hounsell =

Canadian swimmer (born 1951)

Personal information
- Full name: Barbara Jeanne Hounsell
- Nationality: Canadian
- Born: 6 July 1951 (age 75) Toronto, Ontario (CAN)
- Height: 165 cm (5 ft 5 in)
- Weight: 50 kg (110 lb)

Sport
- Sport: Swimming
- Strokes: freestyle, medley
- Club: Whittier Swim Association; City of Commerce (Commerce City, CA)
- Coach: Don Gambril (City of Commerce); Howard Kirby (Canadian Olympic Team)

Barbara Jeanne Hounsell (born 6 July 1951) is a female Canadian former swimmer, born in Toronto, Canada. Hounsell competed in two events at the 1964 Summer Olympics. Despite being of Canadian nationality she won the 440 yards medley title in 1965 at the ASA National British Championships.

== California swimmer ==
Coach Don Gambril

Hounsell lived in Whittier, California and the Los Angeles area for much of her life prior to the 1964 Olympics. By the age of 10, she swam with the Whittier Swim Association team under Coach Paul Gerards where in 1962, the team enjoyed an undefeated Winter season, and Barbara swam freestyle relays and 50-meter races. She did her more intense physical training with Hall of Fame Coach Don Gambril at the highly competitive Rosemead Swim Club and then the City of Commerce Swim Club.

At the Beverly Hills Invitational in January 1964, she placed second in the 400-yard individual medley with a time of 5:04.6, edging out future gold medal Olympic swimmer and City of Commerce teammate Sharon Stouder. Barbara's time was four seconds from the first-place finisher.

== American age-group 200-yard IM record ==
At the age of 12, in May 1964, at the Southern Pacific AAU Swim Championships at the City of Commerce Pool, she eclipsed her own 200-yard Individual Medley American record for girls 11–12 by two seconds with a time of 2:23.1.

== Canadian national medley record ==
At the 1964 National Championships in Toronto, Barbara won the 220-yard Individual Medley with a time of 2:40.9, breaking the Canadian National Record, and won the 440-yard Individual Medley with a 5:33, only 2.3 seconds off the World Record.

== 1964 Tokyo Olympics ==
In September 1964, though she was a resident of California, as she was born in Toronto, Barbara qualified for the Olympics swimming for Canada at the Olympic Trials held at Empire Pool in Vancouver, Canada. At only 13 years, and a little over 3 months she was Canada's youngest swimmer to ever participate in the Olympics.

As a distance swimmer at the 1964 Tokyo Olympics, she swam the 400-meter freestyle in October, placing eighteenth with a time of 5:04.9, and the 400-meter individual medley, placing ninth with a time of 5:38.4. Her 400-meter free results put her about 17 seconds out of bronze medal contention, and her 400-meter individual medley results put her about 14.2 seconds behind contending for a bronze medal. More significantly, as only the first eight finish times qualified for the finals, she did not make the finals in either event.

=== Canadian Nationals gold medal ===
She won a first place gold medal in the 200-meter Individual Medley with a record time of 2:38.5 at the National Canadian Swimming Championships in Alberta, Canada in late July, 1965.

Barbara continued to swim as a Masters swimmer at 35, and in 1986 was swimming and competing with Santa Monica Masters in Santa Monica, California, outside Los Angeles. Santa Monica had a strong program with several other former Olympians and was coached by Clay Evans, a 1972 Olympian for Canada. She had swum with the Trojan masters near USC as a 28 year old in 1979.
