= United States Spring Swimming Championships =

The United States Spring Swimming Championships are held annually in the spring since 1962. The event is governed by USA Swimming. In the 1960s and 1970s, it was governed by USA Swimming's predecessor, the Amateur Athletic Union, as the AAU Indoor National Swimming Championships or National AAU Short Course Swimming Championships. It was originally a short course yards format; this format was revived in 2016 as the United States Short Course Swimming Championships.

== Venues ==
- 1962 – Bartlesville, Oklahoma (men's), Sacramento, California (women's)
- 1963 – New Haven, Connecticut (men's), Berea, Ohio (women's)
- 1964 – Bartlesville, Oklahoma (men's), Pittsburgh, Pennsylvania (women's)
- 1965 – New Haven, Connecticut (men's), Los Angeles, California (women's)
- 1966 – Brandon, Florida (men's), Bartlesville, Oklahoma (women's)
- 1967 – Dallas, Texas (men's), Fairview Park, Ohio (women's)
- 1968 – Greenville, North Carolina (men's), Pittsburgh, Pennsylvania (women's)
- 1969 – Long Beach, California
- 1970 – Keating Natatorium in Cincinnati, Ohio
- 1971 – Pullman, Washington
- 1972 – Dallas, Texas
- 1973 – Miami, Florida
- 1974 – Dallas, Texas
- 1975 – Keating Natatorium in Cincinnati, Ohio
- 1976 – Long Beach, California
- 1977 – Canton, Ohio
- 1978 – Austin, Texas
- 1979 – Los Angeles, California
- 1980 – Austin, Texas
- 1981 – Cambridge, Massachusetts
- 1982 – Gainesville, Florida
- 1983 – Indianapolis, Indiana
- 1984 – Indianapolis, Indiana
- 1985 – Los Angeles, California
- 1986 – Orlando, Florida
- 1987 – Boca Raton, Florida
- 1988 – Orlando, Florida
- 1989 – Chapel Hill, North Carolina (25 yds)
- 1990 – Nashville, Tennessee (25 yds)
- 1991 – Federal Way, Washington (50m)
- 1992 – Indianapolis, Indiana (together with the US Olympic Trials) (50m)
- 1993 – Nashville, Tennessee (50m)
- 1994 – Federal Way, Washington (50m)
- 1995 – Minneapolis, Minnesota (50m)
- 1996 – Orlando, Florida (50m)
- 1997 – Buffalo, New York (50m)
- 1998 – Minneapolis, Minnesota (50m)
- 1999 – Long Island, New York (50m)
- 2000 – Federal Way, Washington (50m)
- 2001 – Austin, Texas (50m)
- 2002 – Minneapolis, Minnesota (50m)
- 2003 – Indianapolis, Indiana (50m)
- 2004 – Orlando, Florida (50m)
- 2005 – Indianapolis, Indiana (together with the US World Championships Trials) (50m)
- 2006 – Federal Way, Washington (50m)
- 2007 – East Meadow, New York (50m)
