= Keating Natatorium =

Indoor swimming venue in Springfield Township, Ohio

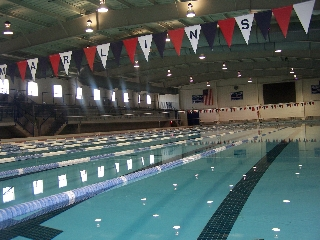
- The Keating Natatorium pool in 2008.
- Interactive map of Keating Natatorium
- Full name: Charles H. Keating Sr. Natatorium
- Address: 600 W. North Bend Rd. Cincinnati, Ohio; United States
- Location: Finneytown, Ohio
- Coordinates: 39°12′34″N 84°30′18″W
- Owner: St. Xavier High School
- Operator: Cincinnati Marlins
- Capacity: 626

Construction
- Groundbreaking: 1969
- Opened: 1970
- Renovated: 2004, 2021
- Cost: $600,000

Tenants
- Cincinnati Marlins, St. Xavier Aquabombers

Charles H. Keating Sr. Natatorium (commonly known as Keating Natatorium) is an indoor swimming venue on the campus of St. Xavier High School in the Finneytown neighborhood of Springfield Township, Hamilton County, Ohio, just outside Cincinnati. It is operated by the Cincinnati Marlins, a non-profit swim team affiliated with USA Swimming. The facility serves as the Marlins' headquarters and central region training facility. It is also the home training base of the St. Xavier Aquabombers swimming and diving, triathlon, and water polo teams. Together, the teams have included 16 future Olympic swimmers.

== Facility ==
Keating Natatorium features a 50-metre-long (160 ft), eight-lane swimming pool. A removable "bulkhead" allows for easy conversion between short and long courses. The facility also includes seating for 626 spectators, locker rooms, and administrative offices.

== History ==
The St. Xavier Aquabombers and Cincinnati Marlins originally trained at other area high schools' pools. In March 1969, Marlins leaders Charles H. Keating Jr. and William J. Keating decided to build an indoor Olympic-size swimming pool on the grounds of their alma mater, St. Xavier. The Keating brothers donated $600,000 (equivalent to $4.86 million in 2024) to St. Xavier, which named the new facility after their father, Charles Sr. Before construction finished, the first meets were held outdoors under bare building frames. The natatorium officially opened in 1970.

In 1998, a major expansion of the high school building connected it to the natatorium. In 2004, additional seating and a video scoreboard were installed. From March to August 2021, Keating Natatorium underwent a $5.5 million renovation.

== Events ==
Keating Natatorium hosted the AAU Indoor National Swimming Championships in 1970 and 1975. It has also hosted major college events and high school invitationals. During postseasons, it hosts Greater Catholic League championships and Ohio High School Athletic Association sectional tournaments.
