= José Ferraioli =

Puerto Rican swimmer (born 1948)

Personal information
- Full name: José E. Ferraioli Weyland
- National team: Puerto Rico
- Born: February 22, 1948 (age 78) San Juan, Puerto Rico
- Height: 180 cm (5 ft 11 in)
- Weight: 77 kg (170 lb)

Sport
- Sport: Swimming
- Strokes: Butterfly, freestyle
- College team: Rutgers University
- Coach: Frank Elm (Rutgers)
Medal record
Representing Puerto Rico
Central American and Caribbean Games
| Gold medal – first place | 1966 San Juan | 100m butterfly |
| Gold medal – first place | 1966 San Juan | 4x100m freestyle relay |
| Gold medal – first place | 1970 Panama City | 4x100m freestyle relay |

José Ferraioli (born 22 February 1948) is a Puerto Rican former swimmer who swam for Rutgers University and competed in the 1968 Summer Olympics.

== 1968 Mexico Olympics ==
Swimming for Puerto Rico at the preliminary heats of the 1968 Mexico Olympics, Ferraioli competed in the 100-meter Freestyle, the 4 × 100-meter Freestyle Relay, the 4 × 200-meter Freestyle Relay, the 100-meter Butterfly, the 200-meter Butterfly, and the 4 × 100-meter Medley Relay. His best showing was in the 4x100 and 4x200-meter Freestyle Relays, where the Puerto Rican team placed 13th and 14th respectively.

In the 4x100 meter freestyle relay preliminary, the Puerto Rican team swam a time of 3:47.0, and did not advance to the finals, but were around 16 seconds behind the time of the American team that included Mark Spitz and Ken Walsh.

== Swimming for Rutgers ==
He swam for Rutgers University under Hall of Fame Coach Frank Elm, and was in the Class of 1969. In his Senior year, Ferraioli was one of two leading point producers for Rutgers at the Eastern Championships, where he performed well in the 100 and 200 butterfly, and 50 freestyle, and was selected to swim the 200 butterfly at the 1969 NCAA championships.

As a Senior, Ferraioli received the James H. Reilley Trophy for "leadership, spirit, and loyalty". Reilly was an Olympic swimmer for Rutgers in 1908 and 1912 and an outstanding Rutgers Coach. With strong contributions by Ferraioli competing primarily in the butterfly and freestyle events, Rutgers placed sixth in the eastern championships that year, and finished the season with a 7-3 dual meet record.
