= Philip Riker =

American swimmer (born 1946)

- Riker in 1967

Personal information
- Full name: Philip Riker III
- National team: United States
- Born: September 16, 1946 (age 79) Passaic, New Jersey, U.S.
- Height: 5 ft 7 in (1.70 m)
- Weight: 150 lb (68 kg)

Sport
- Sport: Swimming
- Strokes: Butterfly
- Club: Sun Dance Swim Club
- College team: University of North Carolina
- Coach: Pat Earey (UNC)
Medal record
Representing United States
Summer Universiade
Gold medal – first place	1965 Budapest	4x100m medley relay
Silver medal – second place	1965 Budapest	200m butterfly

Philip Riker III (born September 16, 1946) is an American former competition swimmer for the University of North Carolina, and a 1964 U.S. Olympic competitor in the 200-meter butterfly.

== Early education and swimming ==
A native of Paterson, New Jersey, Riker learned to swim around the age of three, and soon began attending meets in AAU competition. He started as a freestyler, then competed in backstroke and by thirteen began to compete in his signature stroke, the butterfly. Some of his early swimming took place at the Paterson YMCA. By 14, he was an age group national champion in the 100-meter butterfly. Riker swam for Paterson's Eastside High School, where he served as captain. During his high school years, he received instruction by Hall of Fame Rutgers Coach Frank Elm, another native of Paterson, who had coached at the Paterson YMCA.

=== State records at Eastside High ===
Helping his Eastside High School team place second overall, his winning times in the New Jersey State Interscholastic Athletic Association championships at Princeton University on March 2, 1962, were 56 seconds flat in the 100-yard butterfly, and 4:19.2 in the 400-yard freestyle. Both swims were state records. In February 1964, cutting his former time, Riker set a 100-yard butterfly meet record of 54.4 at the E.I.S. High School competition, placing first in the event. He would continue to cut his 100-yard butterfly times as a High School upperclassman.

=== Prep school record, Lawrenceville School ===
Later attending the Lawrenceville School, around his junior and senior years, he was an All America Prep School swimmer, and again served as team captain for their highly competitive swim program under Coach Phil Pratt, who served as Prep School Chairman for the National Interscholastic Swimming Coaches Association. In 1963, Riker broke the Prep School record for the 100-yard butterfly at the Lawrenceville School with a time which he cut to 52.5. Riker also set a Prep School record in the 400-yard freestyle relay with a team time of 3:26.3 while at the Lawrenceville School.

== 1964 Tokyo Olympics ==
Riker represented the United States as an 18-year-old at the October, 1964 Summer Olympics in Tokyo. He competed in the men's 200-meter butterfly, and finished fourth overall in the event final with a time of 2:11.0. Riker finished 4.4 seconds behind Gold medal winner Kevin Barry of Australia, and 1.7 seconds behind Fred Schmidt, the American bronze medal winner who had initially led the competition before fading. Carl Robie, the silver medalist was an occasional swim rival for Riker at international competitions.

Riker also spent some time swimming for Coach Bob Alexander who was the Head Coach for the U.S National swim team in 1965 when Riker was a member. Alexander also coached the New Jersey Athletic Association's (NJAA) swim team in Montclair, New Jersey. Alexander had trained several of Riker's 1964 Olympic swimming team mates including Jed Graef, Thompson Mann, and Patience Sherman, primarily with his NJAA team.

== North Carolina swimming ==
After graduating Lawrenceville School, he attended the University of North Carolina at Chapel Hill, where he swam for Coach Pat Earey, with the North Carolina Tar Heels swimming and diving team in National Collegiate Athletic Association (NCAA) competition from 1965 to 1968. Riker won the NCAA National Championship in the 100 meter Butterfly in April 1966, with a time of 51.1 seconds, though he had done the event in 51 flat. He began his studies at North Carolina around February 1965, starting a semester late after his Olympic experience. During his college years, he was a first-team All-America six times in the 100 and 200 fly, the 4x100 medley relay and the 4x200 free relay from 1965 through 68. As noted, in his Sophomore year, Riker won the 100-yard butterfly at the Atlantic Coast Conference Championships in February 1966, with a time of 52.6 seconds, helping his University of North Carolina team win the Championships.

In July 1967, Riker won the 100-meter butterfly and placed second in the 200-meter butterfly at the Eastern U.S. Championships in Lancaster, Pennsylvania. He was coached that year by Hall of Fame Rutgers swimming coach Frank Elm in Plainfield, New Jersey. By February 1976, Riker was the Atlantic Coast Conference Champion in the 100 and 200-yard butterfly, as well as the Eastern NCAA champion in the same events.

Riker participated in some United States Masters swimming events, primarily in the butterfly in 1986 and 1988 in Florida, and in 1993 with the Palmetto Masters in Palmetto, South Carolina.

== Honors ==
As a leading AAU area swimmer, Riker was chosen to receive the Harry B. Gourley Memorial Award for 1964. He was inducted into the North Carolina Swimming Hall of Fame in April 1991.

== See also ==
- List of University of North Carolina at Chapel Hill alumni
- List of University of North Carolina at Chapel Hill Olympians
