= Scott Goldblatt =

American swimmer (born 1979)

Personal information
- Full name: Scott Daniel Goldblatt
- National team: United States
- Born: July 12, 1979 (age 47) Summit, New Jersey, U.S.
- Height: 6 ft 2 in (1.88 m)
- Weight: 170 lb (77 kg)
- Spouses: Coleen (m. Nov. 2002)

Sport
- Sport: Swimming
- Strokes: Freestyle
- College team: University of Texas
- Coach: Eddie Reese, UT
Medal record
Men's swimming
Representing the United States
Olympic Games
Gold medal – first place	2004 Athens	4x200 m freestyle
Silver medal – second place	2000 Sydney	4x200 m freestyle
World Championships (LC)
Silver medal – second place	2003 Barcelona	4x200 m freestyle
Bronze medal – third place	2001 Fukuoka	4x200 m freestyle
Summer Universiade
Gold medal – first place	1997 Catania	4x200 m freestyle
Silver medal – second place	1997 Catania	200 m freestyle

Scott Daniel Goldblatt (born July 12, 1979) is an American former competition swimmer and Olympic gold medalist who specialized in freestyle events. While swimming primarily in the lead position of the 4 x 200 freestyle relay, Goldblatt took a gold and silver in the 2000, and 2004 Olympics and a silver and bronze medal in the 2001 and 2003 World Aquatics Championships. He also performed well in the 2005 Maccabiah Games in Israel, winning several medals.

== Biography ==
Raised in Scotch Plains, New Jersey, Goldblatt first began swimming in the children's pool at his local Willow Grove Swim Club in Scotch Plains. He began competitive swimming around the age of eight. In July 1993, at the age of 14, he took a first place in his age group at the 100 free at the Garden State Games with a time of 59.27, impressive for his age. He also won the 200 with a 2:06.95 as well as the 400 free. His skills as a sprinter were recognized in his early career. He swam for the Scotch Plains/Fanwood YMCA until he joined the Berkeley Aquatic Club under head coach Jim Wood.

In 1995, at the age of 15, he qualified for his first national championships and was named Rookie of the Meet. Two years later, in 1997, he broke into the World Top 50 rankings after being rated 46th in the 200-meter Freestyle. He was also named to the World University Games team, where he won both a gold and a silver medal. Goldblatt graduated in 1997 from Scotch Plains-Fanwood High School.

=== University of Texas swimming ===
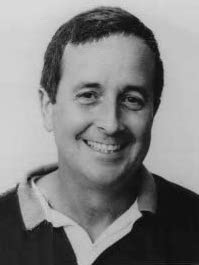
U of Texas Swim Coach Eddie Reese, 1968

Goldblatt attended the University of Texas from around 1997 to the summer of 2002, and received a degree in sport management. From 2000 to 2002, Texas won the NCAA Swimming Team Championships in three successive years. Goldblatt's coach at Texas, Eddie Reese led the Longhorns team to 15 NCAA championships, and gave the team international recognition. Reese also served as an Olympic Coach from 2000 to 2012 and as a Head Olympic Coach in 2004 and 2008. During his first two years at Texas, Scott was named All-American in five events and won two NCAA relay titles. During these years, he did not improve internationally, and subsequently fell from the World Rankings in the 200-meter Freestyle.

At the NCAA Championships in 2000, he was a member of Texas's NCAA title-winning relay for the third straight year, and helped lead Texas to the NCAA Championship, being named an All-American in four events.

=== 2000 Olympic Silver medal in 4 x 200 relay ===
In July 2000 he qualified for the United States Olympic Team. In Sydney, Goldblatt finished ninth in the 200-meter Freestyle qualifier, just missing the finals by .04 seconds, but was pleased to win a Silver medal as a member of the 4x200 Freestyle Relay. Leading off the relay, he swam a 1:49.66, giving the U. S. team an excellent start, and becoming New Jersey's first Olympic medalist. The U.S. received their relay medals on September 19, 2000, at Sydney's International Aquatic Center. After not being ranked internationally for two years in the 200-meter Freestyle, Goldblatt was now ranked ninth in the world and was the sixth fastest American ever in the 200-meter Freestyle.

=== 2001 World Championships 4x200 Bronze ===
After returning to Texas, he helped lead the team to another NCAA championship and won a fourth straight relay title while breaking the American Record in the 4x200 Freestyle Relay. Goldblatt then qualified for the 2001 World Championships where he won a bronze medal, and finished the year ranked 11th in the 200 Freestyle. Scott led off the American team, and was followed by Nate Dusing, Chad Carvin, and Klete Keller, clocking a combined time of 7:13:69.4.

In the fall of 2001, he was informed his left forearm had nerve damage that would require surgery. Goldblatt re-entered the pool in late December and had to relearn how to learn how to swim with his left arm. At the National Championships in March, he scored a third-place finish in the 200-meter Freestyle, and won his first national championship in the 400-meter Freestyle.

=== 2003 World Championships, Silver medal, 4x200 relay ===
In the summer of 2002 he graduated from the University of Texas at the same time he was qualifying for the World Championship Team set to compete in 2003. At the same meet, he just missed qualifying for the Pan Pacific Championships to be held that August. At the World Championships in Barcelona, Goldblatt won a Silver medal as a part of the 4x200 American Freestyle Relay Team, though he did not swim in the final heat, and finished the year ranked eighth in world in the 200-meter Freestyle.

He moved to Kansas City in early 2003 after marrying his wife Colleen in November, 2002 after she started a job in the Kansas City area. He originally met Colleen, who was from Topeka, Kansas, while he was attending the University of Texas.

=== 2004 Olympic Gold 4x200 relay ===
While living in Kansas City, Goldblatt trained for a period with swim coach Peter Malone for the 2004 Olympics in Athens. He finished sixth in the 200 Freestyle, earning him a spot on the 4x200 Freestyle Relay team at the Olympic Games in Athens. Here he swam in the preliminaries of the 4x200 Freestyle Relay, and he eventually won the Olympic Gold Medal as a member of that team. Scott swam as the lead off in Heat 1 of the 4 x 200 qualifiers, with a time of, 1:49:53 which allowed Michael Phelps to rest for the finals. Phelps led off the final Gold medal heat with a time of 1:46:49, beating Scott's time by three seconds.

=== 2005 Maccabiah Games medals ===
At the 2005 Maccabiah Games, he won gold medals in the 4x100 freestyle relay and the 4x200 freestyle relay, a silver medal in the 200m freestyle, and a bronze medal in the 100m free.

In 2006, Goldblatt was founder of the swimming blog TimedFinals.com. It became part of swimnetwork.com in March 2008. He has worked as co-host of an internet radio show with creator Nathan Jendrick, which is featured as part of DeckPass.com. As of 2008, with his wife Coleen, he was living in Kansas City with their daughter Avery.

== See also ==
- List of Olympic medalists in swimming (men)
- List of select Jewish swimmers
- List of University of Texas at Austin alumni
- List of World Aquatics Championships medalists in swimming (men)
