= Jonty Skinner =

South African swimmer (born 1954)

Personal information
- Full name: John Alexander Skinner
- Nickname: "Jonty"
- National team: South Africa
- Born: 15 February 1954 (age 72) Cape Town, South Africa
- Height: 6 ft 5 in (1.96 m)
- Weight: 185 lb (84 kg)
- Coaching career

Playing career
- 1974–1978: University of Alabama

Coaching career (HC unless noted)
- 1978–1981: University of Alabama; Asst. Coach; University Aquatic Club
- 1981–1988: San Jose Aquatics Club
- 1988–1990: University of Alabama; Asst. Coach
- 1990–1994: University of Alabama
- 1994–2008: USA Swimming; Coach, Director Team Tech. Support
- 2009–2012: British National Team; Coach, Director Team Tech. Support
- 2012–2019: University of Alabama
- 2019–2020: Indiana University; Assoc. Coach

Accomplishments and honors

Championships
- 4 top 20, 1 top 10 NCAA Champs (U of Alabama) 5 jr. team National Championships '86 National Team Championship (San Jose Aquatics)

Awards
- '85 Int. Swimming Hall of Fame '76 U of Alabama Swim. Hall of Fame

Sport
- Sport: Swimming
- Strokes: Freestyle
- Club: Central Jersey Aquatic Club
- College team: University of Alabama
- Coach: Don Gambril; Alabama; Bill Palmer; Central New Jersey Swim Club

John "Jonty" Alexander Skinner (born 15 February 1954) is a former Hall of Fame South African competition swimmer and world record-holder, who for over forty years served as an American club and college swimming coach primarily at his alma mater, the University of Alabama before retiring as a coach in 2020. He coached the US national team in the mid-1990s, remaining as a Director of Team Performance through 2008.

== Swimming career ==
Skinner was born in Cape Town, South Africa, and graduated from Selborne College in East London, South Africa. At the 1973 South African National Swimming Championships he won the 100-metre freestyle event and backed that up by winning the event again at the 1974 National Championships. He was awarded the title of South Africa Athlete of the Year and was also awarded South African National Colours in Swimming and Life Saving.

=== University of Alabama ===
Skinner moved to the United States in 1974, largely to attend the University of Alabama, where he was a member of the accomplished Alabama Crimson Tide swimming and diving team, and competed as part of the NCAA and the Southeastern Conference. At Alabama, he swam under Hall of Fame coach Don Gambril who would serve as a U.S. Swim team coach at five Olympics from 1968–1984 and would likely have been assigned to Skinner had he been eligible for the 1976 Olympics.

As only a Freshman swimming for Alabama, Skinner won the 100-yard freestyle in a time of 43.92, at the late March 1975 NCAA Division I Swimming and Diving Championships in Cleveland. He was elected Alabama's most valuable swimmer in 1975, 1976 and 1977, and was later voted as Alabama's Athlete of the Year. Skinner graduated Alabama in 1978 with a degree in Communications and public relations, and by 1976, in his Junior year was hoping to apply for U.S. Citizenship.

For the upcoming 1976 Montreal Olympics, many sports analysts considered Skinner second in line for a gold medal in the 100-meter freestyle. Prior to the Olympics, in three meetings with future 1976 100-meter gold medalist Jim Montgomery, Skinner finished second to Montgomery by electronic margins as tiny as .03 seconds twice and .3 seconds once.

In addition to his 100-meter world record, he set three American records in the 100 yard freestyle.

== 1976 100-meter world record ==
In 1976, despite his excellent chances of winning the gold medal in the 100-metre freestyle at the 1976 Summer Olympics in Montreal, Canada, at the time South Africa was still banned from the Olympics hence making Skinner ineligible to compete.

=== Breaking the 100-meter free world record ===
After the 1976 Olympics, at the August, 1976 United States Summer Swimming Championships in Philadelphia, Pennsylvania, though barely qualifying in the finals, Skinner broke Jim Montgomery's 20-day-old world record in the 100-metre freestyle by 0.55 seconds beating home the recent Olympic Champion Montgomery and Joe Bottom who won silver in 100m butterfly in Montreal and finished sixth in the 100m free final. His record stood until 3 April 1981 when Rowdy Gaines swam the distance in 49.36 seconds in Texas. Skinner trained for a period before his record breaking swim with Coach Bill Palmer's Central Jersey Aquatic Club in Monmouth County, New Jersey.

In 1975, the year he set the American 100-yard record at the NCAA championships, Skinner was one of the first inductees into the University of Alabama Swimming and Diving Hall of Fame, which had been established by his mentor and Alabama college coach Don Gambril. Skinner's last competitive race was the 100-yard freestyle at the 1978 AAU Short Course Indoor Nationals in Austin, which he won in 43.29, retiring from competitive swimming afterwards, but was engaged in coaching the same year.

In 1985, he was recognized by the swimming world when he was inducted into the International Swimming Hall of Fame as an Honor Swimmer.

== Coaching career ==
Skinner began his coaching career in 1978 when he was appointed assistant coach of University of Alabama's swim team. He also coached at the University Aquatic Club in Tuscaloosa during this period. He swam with the Central Jersey Aquatic Club in Long Branch, New Jersey, beginning around 1976, and in the Summer of 1979, he coached youth there, working under Head Coach Bill Palmer. After three years he moved to California and became the head coach of the San Jose Aquatics Club where under his guidance the club won five junior national championship team titles and in 1986 took the national championship team title at Phillips 66 Long Course Senior Nationals. He served as head coach until 1988.

He returned to the University of Alabama in 1988 as assistant head coach, and then took over the reins as the head swimming and diving coach of the men's and women's teams in 1990, serving until 1994.

=== USA Swimming ===
From 1994 to 2000 Skinner served as USA Swimming's resident team coach, which involved coaching some of the nation's top swimmers at the elite national and international level. From 2000 to 2008 Skinner served as USA Swimming's Director of National Team Technical Support, which involves co-ordinating all of the testing, tracking and assessment of the national team athletes.

In 2009, he operated Athletic Intelligence Consulting and was an UpMyGame coach.

=== Coaching at Alabama, Indiana ===
In May 2012 he rejoined the University of Alabama swimming and diving team as an assistant coach, and stayed with the team through 2018.

For the 2019–2020, swimming season, though he had planned to retire as the Alabama Coach, he was recruited to coach for University of Indiana after the team lost several support coaches under Head Coach Ray Looze.

=== Retirement ===
He retired mid-season from Indiana in February 2020, permanently retiring as a swimming coach.

Skinner resided in Tuscaloosa, Alabama while coaching at the university. He and his wife Carol Ann have two children, Cleone and Cydney.

== See also ==
- List of members of the International Swimming Hall of Fame
- List of University of Alabama people
- World record progression 50 metres freestyle
- World record progression 100 metres freestyle

Records
| Preceded by none | Men's 50-metre freestyle world record-holder (long course); 14 August 1976 – 3 July 1977 | Succeeded by Joe Bottom |
| Preceded by Jim Montgomery | Men's 100-metre freestyle world record-holder (long course); 14 August 1976 – 3 April 1981 | Succeeded by Rowdy Gaines |
