= Burt Kanner =

American former swimmer, swimming coach, announcer and author

- Kanner at 21, Occidental College Hall of Fame

Biographical details
- Born: July 30, 1939; Bronx, New York
- Education: Occidental College; Los Angeles

Playing career
- 1957-1961: Occidental College
- 1961: U.S. Swim Team; Maccabiah Games
- Position: Freestyle swimming

Coaching career (HC unless noted)
- 1959-1962: Eagle Rock High L.A.
- 1963: Occidental College L.A.
- 1966-1967: L. A. Athletic Club (Asst. w/Don Gambril)
- 1966-1973: Caltech AAU Club
- 1970-1982 1985-1991: San Marino High; Taught Math 23 yrs.
- 1993-1994: Albany Aquatics Team; Salem, Oregon

Head coaching record
- Overall: Dual Meets 211-10-1.95 Win Pct.

Accomplishments and honors

Championships
- 4 × South. Cal. Leag. Champions (Caltech AAU Team) 8 × California Interschol. Champions; Class II Pub. School Nat. Champions; 19 × Rio Hondo (Regional) Champions (San Marino High School)

Awards
- Region 8 Swim. Coach of the Year '91 California Coaches Assoc. High School Swim. Coach of the Year '91 NHSACA Coach of the Year '91 South. Cal. Jewish Sports Hall of Fame
Medal record
Representing the United States
Maccabiah Games
Gold medal – first place	1961 Israel	4×200 free relay Swimming

Burt Kanner (born July 30, 1939) is an American former swimmer, math teacher, swimming coach, public address announcer, and author. He is best known for coaching the San Marino High School Swim Team for eighteen years from 1970-1982, and 1985-1991 where he led the team to 8 California State (California Interscholastic Federation) Championships and 12 League Championships. His teams had an overall record of 211-10-1, earning an exceptional .95 Winning Percentage.

== Education and early swimming ==
Born in the Bronx, New York in 1939 to Julius Kanner and Celia Newman, Burt came to Southern California at an early age. He took up swimming early and won his first competitive swim race at the age of ten. Kanner attended Verdugo Hills High in Tujunga, California where he graduated in 1957. While at Verdugo, he received a Most Valuable Player Trophy for Swimming in 1956, and received the Varsity Award in June 1957 as a Senior.

He later attended Occidental College in Los Angeles where he studied Mathematics, graduating in June 1961. He earned a Masters of Education from Cal State University Los Angeles in 1966. Captaining the Occidental Swim team from 1960–61, Kanner set school records in all freestyle swimming events during his four years of competition from 1957-61. He was named Athlete of the Year at Occidental in July 1961, setting meet and conference records of 2:22.7 in the 200-yard Butterfly and 2:09.2 in the 220-yard freestyle during a meet at Caltech. In 1961, he held the Southern California Interscholastic Athletic Conference (SCIAC) record for the 100-yard freestyle, at 51.3 seconds, a record which held for two years.

== Competitive swimmer ==
=== Maccabiah games ===
He was one of the eighteen member US swim team chosen to compete at the 1961 Maccabiah Games in August in Tel Aviv, Israel. In July, prior to the August Maccabiah Games, Burt trained with the Los Angeles Athletic Club, then under Hall of Fame Head Coach Peter Daland, whom he had met after a college meet, and who would become a friend and mentor. Kanner was particularly challenged by Daland's workouts.

Burt helped win a gold medal as part of the four member 1961 U.S. 800-meter freestyle relay team that took a significant lead over the Israeli and South African teams at Ramat Gan Stadium in Tel Aviv District and won the event with a combined team time of 8:46.3. Overall, the American swimming team won all but three of the swimming events.

=== U.S. Masters National records ===
In 1974, around age 35, he set seven American Masters National records which included the 100, 200, 400, and 1500 meter freestyle events, as well as the 100 and 200-meter butterfly.

Continuing to swim into later life, at the Eel Lake Open Water Swim in August, 2004, Kanner placed first in his 65-69 age group in both the 3000 and 1500 meter competitions. He swam in several National meets with Oregon Masters, frequently placing in the top ten in his age group.

== Southern California swim coaching ==
With all the opportunities in Los Angeles, Kanner was able to gain coaching experience while still attending college at Occidental. He coached the swim team at Eagle Rock High School from 1959-1962, and spent one year as Head Coach for his Alma Mater Occidental in 1963.

From 1966-1967, Kanner was Assistant Coach for the Los Angeles Athletic Club Swim Team. While there, he was mentored by Head Coach Don Gambril, a Hall of Fame inductee, Olympic Coach and long serving coach for the University of Alabama. In different years, both Don and Burt had attended and swam for Occidental College in Los Angeles and had been recognized by Occidental's Aquatic Hall of Fame.

Prior to 1966, Kanner was busy obtaining his Master's Degree. One of Kanner's earlier coaching experiences was with Caltech's Pasadena AAU team from 1966-1973, where he led the team to four Southern California League Championships. He coached for one year at Pasadena's John Muir High School in 1969, where he served as a math teacher for six years.

=== San Marino High School coach ===
Kanner is probably best known for coaching the swim team at San Marino High School for eighteen years from 1970–82, and 1985-1991, taking off the years 83-84. At San Marino, he led the team to eight California Interscholastic Federation Championships. He worked as a Math Teacher at San Marino for twenty-three years from around 1969-1992, and served as Chair of the Department of Mathematics.

By 1976, two of his San Marino High School swimmers had broken all of the School records, Mike Elleman, and Ron Kehrmann, a 6' 2" Israeli swimmer who held a National Record in his native country. With swimming the family business, in 1986 Burt's son Michael, who he also coached at San Marino, was the top backstroker in the Public School Division and later, at around 21, set a record for the 200-meter backstroke at the 1989 Maccabiah Games, taking a Silver medal in the 100-meter backstroke. Kanner's son Dan, like his father, was also selected to compete for the U.S. Team at the Maccabiah Games in 1993 where he won the 200 and 400 free events. He had been a member of the 1992 Stanford NCAA championship team. While coached by his father as a High School Senior at San Marino, Daniel was the 500 freestyle National Champion in 1989, when the school was the Class II Public School National Champion. When Burt retired from coaching swimming at San Marino in 1992, the High School's swimming pool was named the Kanner Pool to recognize his achievements.

Kanner gained additional experience coaching with United States Master's Swim teams, starting the Caltech Masters team around 1970. He later started the Altadena Masters at Altadena Town and Country Club which, during his coaching tenure from 1976-1986, won a number of league championships. When not teaching school and coaching school swim teams during summer break, he could devote time exclusively to coaching Masters swimming.

== Move to Salem, Oregon ==
In 1992, he and his wife Mona, whom he married in 1986, moved to Salem, Oregon, where he coached the Club Team at the Albany Aquatics Center for a year. He later coached a Master's swim team at the Kroc Center Salem, in Salem, Oregon in 2009. He continued to teach High School Math, at a South Salem High School where he taught a total of around fifteen years. He would later teach part-time at Chemeketa Community College after 2006.

== Public address announcer ==
Kanner began his career as a public address announcer primarily for swimming competitions in 1976, and continued through 2001. He served as a swimming announcer for the Pacific-10 conference, California junior college championships, the U.S. short and long-course swimming championships, the World University Games and most impressively for the 1984 summer olympics in Los Angeles. He spent 20 years announcing PAC-10 conference meets, and 8 years announcing NCAA Division I meets.

He wrote a Handbook on the art of public announcing for swim meets which he submitted to USA Swimming. As a highlight to his career, in 1996 he served as the public address announcer for swimming at the 1996 summer Olympics in Atlanta.

== Honors ==
Kanner had broad recognition as a swim coach. In 1991, he was awarded the California Coaches Association High School Boys Swimming Coach of the Year. and was inducted into the Southern California Jewish Sports Hall of Fame.

Kanner was a Region 8 Swimming Coach of the Year, and a 1991 National High School Athletic Coaches Association (NHSACA) Swimming Coach of the Year. In a more recent honor in 2023, Kanner was inducted into the Los Angeles Unified School District's Alumni Hall of Fame.

=== Author ===
He published Don Gambril: A Coach with a Heart in 2022, a biography about the long serving University of Alabama Swim Coach, and U.S. Head swim coach for the 1984 Summer Olympics. Kanner was mentored by Gambril, while serving as his Assistant coach at the Los Angeles Athletic Club in 1966-67.

== See also ==
- Southern California Jewish Sports Hall of Fame
