= Dan Ketchum =

American swimmer (born 1981)

Personal information
- Full name: Daniel Ketchum
- Nickname: Dan
- National team: United States
- Born: October 7, 1981 (age 44) Cincinnati, Ohio, U.S.
- Height: 193 cm (6 ft 4 in)
- Weight: 212 lb (96 kg)

Sport
- Sport: Swimming
- Strokes: Freestyle
- Club: Cincinnati Marlins
- College team: University of Michigan
- Coach: Ken Stopkotte (Marlins); Jon Urbanchek (Michigan)
Medal record
Men's swimming
Representing the United States
Olympic Games
| Gold medal – first place | Athens 2004 | 4x200 m freestyle |
World Championships (SC)
| Gold medal – first place | 2004 Indianapolis | 4×200 m freestyle |

Daniel "Dan" Ketchum (born October 7, 1981) is an American former swimmer and Olympic gold medalist who competed for the University of Michigan. At the 2004 Summer Olympics in Athens, Greece, Ketchum earned a gold medal by swimming for the winning U.S. team in the men's 4×200-meter freestyle relay.

== Early life and swimming ==
Ketchum was born in Cincinnati, Ohio, on October 7, 1981, the oldest of three brothers, to father John, a Procter & Gamble employee, and mother Fern. In his early teens, he spent two years in Ireland from 1994 to 1996, where he swam with Limerick Swimming Club and attended Villiers School.

== High school era swimming ==
The family moved back from Limerick in August 1996, when Procter & Gamble transferred Ketchum's father, John, into the Sycamore District in Greater Cincinnati. Ketchum swam for the Cincinnati Marlins swim club as an age group swimmer under Coach Ken Stopkotte through 2000 and in his senior year, under Marlin's interim Coach Jeff Stewart. Beginning around 1996 and graduating in 2000, he attended Sycamore High School in Cincinnati, where he trained and competed with the Sycamore High team, under Coach Mark Sullivan. While swimming for Sycamore High, he won six individual Ohio state swimming championships in 1998, 1999 and 2000—three each in the 200-yard and 500-yard freestyle events. By 16, Ketchum trained 5-6 hours a day, and averaged around 7,000 yards or over 4 miles per workout. Already an elite age group freestyle distance swimmer, Ketchum held local records in the 200 freestyle of 1:41.4, and in the 500 freestyle of 4:32.6. In 1998, he set the Ohio State Meet record in the 500-yard freestyle with a time of 4:25.68. in 1999, he broke Joe Hudepohl’s state record of 4:24.4 with a 4:22.73. Additionally, he was the National high school champion in the 200 Free that year, setting a 1:37.29.

Ketchum qualified for the 2000 Olympic trials with his times at the Senior Nationals in Long Island, New York. At the August 2000 Olympic trials in Indianapolis, Ketchum placed 21st in the Men's 400-meter freestyle and 64th in the 200 Butterfly. In the 200 freestyle, where he could achieve a higher place, he finished around 15th overall with a time of 1:51.72, and did not qualify for the finals. A strong stroke competitor, he finished 16th overall and made the semi-finals in the 200 Individual Medley with a 2:08.22.

== University of Michigan ==
He attended the University of Michigan, beginning around the Fall of 2000, and graduated with the class of 2005 with a major in Mechanical Engineering. At Michigan, he swam for the Michigan Wolverines swimming and diving team in National Collegiate Athletic Association (NCAA) competition under Coach Jon Urbanchek through most of his tenure with the team. In March 2004, he was a member of Michigan's NCAA national championship team in the 800-meter freestyle relay held in East Meadow, New York, together with Peter Vanderkaay, Davis Tarwater and Andrew Hurd. With a strong finish by their anchor Andrew Hurd, Ketcham's 2004 NCAA championship team swam a combined time of 7:01.42, defeating the second-place Stanford team by over four seconds. At Michigan, Ketchum received 15 honors as an All-American, and was a Big Ten Conference Champion in the 200 freestyle in three separate years.

== 2004 Athens Olympics ==
Moving up from his placement at the 2000 Olympic trials as a University of Michigan senior, Ketchum won a spot on the U.S. 800-meter freestyle relay team with a fifth-place finish in the 200-meter freestyle at the U.S. trials in July in Long Beach, California. His Michigan teammate Peter Vanderkay also won a spot with a third-place finish in the 200-meter freestyle qualifier.

At the 2004 Summer Olympics in Athens, Greece, Ketchum earned a gold medal by swimming in the first preliminary heat for the winning U.S. team in the men's 4×200-meter freestyle relay. On the morning of August 17, 2004, his 4x200 relay team swam a 7:12.80 in the Round 1 preliminary heat, winning the heat to help advance the U.S. team to the final round. Later, in the evening of August 17, the winning U.S. team that did not include Ketcham, swam a 7:07.33 in the finals, placing first to win the gold. The Australian team placed second with a 7:07.46, and the Italian team placed third with a 7:11.83.

== International competition ==
He represented the United States at the Universiade in 2001, where he captured a bronze in the 200 free and swam on a 4 x 200 freestyle relay team that won a silver medal. In international competition, at the World Short Course Swimming Championships in 2004, he swam as part of the gold medal-winning 4 x 200 freestyle relay team. At the Summer Pan American Games in 2003 in Santo Domingo, he captured a gold in the 4×200 meter freestyle relay, and in individual events, won a silver in the 200 meter freestyle.

== Coaching ==
He assumed the role of head coach of the swim team at Loveland High School starting in the 2009-10 high school swim season. During his first season as head coach, he led the Tigers to their best results in history at the 2010 OHSAA Swimming and Diving Championship Meet, where his boys finished seventh overall, and the girls finished 14th overall. He was replaced as Loveland High School swim coach in December 2011 by Emily Courtney.

Ketchum worked as an engineer for General Electric while living in Loveland, Ohio.

== See also ==
- List of Olympic medalists in swimming (men)
- List of University of Michigan alumni
