= Renee Magee =

American swimmer

- Early years, circa mid-70's

Personal information
- Full name: Holly Renee Magee; Renee Tucker
- National team: United States
- Born: March 30, 1959 Texas City, Texas
- Died: July 13, 2022 (aged 63) Humble, TX
- Height: 5 ft 11 in (1.80 m)
- Weight: 146 lb (66 kg)
- Spouse: James Tucker
- Children: 2

Sport
- Sport: Swimming
- Strokes: Backstroke
- Club: Bellevue Swim Club (Nebraska); Dad's Swim Club (Houston)
- College team: University of North Carolina
- Coach: Jack Jackson, Jo Heckel (Bellevue Club, Ne.); Skip Kenney (Dad's Club)

Holly Renee Magee (March 30, 1959 – July 13, 2022), also known by her married name Renee Tucker, was an American former competition swimmer who represented the United States in the 100 meter backstroke at the 1976 Summer Olympics in Montreal, Quebec. In 1976, in Austin, Texas, she set a National High School Record in the 100-yard backstroke. She would later work as a District Attorney and be elected to serve as a Judge in Houston's 337th District Court from 2013-16.

She was born to Jack and June Magee on March 30, 1959, one of the youngest children to a large family, in Texas City. Renee and her seven siblings spent much of their youth in the swimming pool where she began competitive swimming around the age of five. After a move to Omaha when she was quite young, she would attend Lincoln East High School and swim for several Lincoln area swim clubs before completing her final High School year and graduating Clear Lake High School outside Houston, Texas.

== Early swim career ==
When the family moved to Omaha, Nebraska to be with their father who had moved earlier to work at Offut Air Force Base, she became a standout age group swimmer. She initially swam for the Lincoln Swim Club, and continued to compete through her adolescent years. Excelling in multiple strokes, she won backstroke, freestyle, butterfly, and medley competitions. While swimming for Lincoln Swim Club, she was winning competitions as early as 12, placing first in backstroke and freestyle events at the Midwestern AAU Junior Olympics in February 1972.

By March 1974, while not quite 15, competing for the Bellevue Swim Club, she broke a record in the 200-yard butterfly at the Great Plains Championships in Lincoln, Nebraska. Bellevue's coaches Jack Jackson and Jo Heckel recognized her early potential and did much to develop it.

== Outstanding swimmer honors ==
At 15, while a Sophomore at Lincoln East High School, her Bellevue Swim Club coaches recommended she try out for the Olympics after she was named the outstanding swimmer at the Nebraska Girl's State Swim Meet in Lincoln in November 1974, setting a state record for her 100 yard leg in a freestyle relay, and winning a 200 yard medley and a 100 yard backstroke competition in 1:00.170. She excelled in the same meet the following year as well.

== Texas State champion, national record holder ==
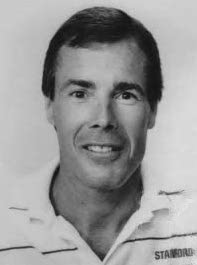
Coach Skip Kenney, 1988

After her family moved to Houston in 1975, she was coached by Skip Kenney with Houston's Dad's Swim Club, who improved her competition times with long practices, and technique work on her strokes.

An exceptional High School swimmer, while swimming with Dad's Club she also led Houston area Clear Lake High School, as a Senior to the 1976 state title in Austin Texas, receiving three gold medals and setting three state records. On March 20, 1976, she set a National High School record in the 100-yard backstroke of 58.9, and was named the Texas State Championship meet's Outstanding Swimmer. She broke her own former state record of 59.8. She also won the 200-yard Individual Medley.

== 1976 Olympics ==
In June 1976, she qualified for the Olympics at the trials in Long Beach, California, with a 1:05.78 in the 100 meter backstroke, though as a third place finisher she was initially qualified as an alternate. She won a spot on the team when one of the first or second place finishers qualified in another event. While at the Olympics, she was coached by Women's Head Coach Jack Nelson.

The first female swimmer in Texas to participate in the Olympics in an individual event, at the 1976 Montreal Olympics, at the age of 17 she swam in the women's 100-meter backstroke, finishing nineteenth, and recording a time of 1:06.44, in the preliminaries.

== Education and career ==
A member of the 1977 Berlin world championship team while at the University of North Carolina, she won all-American honor four times in college. She earned a law degree and completed her BBA undergraduate degree from the University of Houston from 1987-1992. In 1992-2012, she worked as a district attorney in Harris County. She served as a Special Crimes Prosecutor and worked as a chief in four Criminal District Courts. In 2013 Magee ascended to the bench, winning election as a judge in Houston's 337th District Court through 2016. She also worked in the Galveston County Criminal justice system.

== Honors ==
In 2011, she was elected a member of the Texas Swimming and Diving Hall of Fame.

She died at her home in Humble, Texas, in the Houston, Texas area on July 13, 2022 after suffering from a brain tumor. She had two children, a son who was an Attorney, and a daughter who was a physician.

== See also ==
- List of University of North Carolina at Chapel Hill alumni
