= Frank Busch =

American swimming coach (1951–2026)

Biographical details
- Born: February 4, 1951; Cincinnati, Ohio, U.S.
- Died: September 27, 2026 (aged 75); Phoenix, Arizona, U.S.

Playing career
- 1969–1973: Loyola University
- Positions: Freestyle, Breastroke, Medley; Water Polo Team

Coaching career (HC unless noted)
- 1967–1974: Brookwood Swim Club
- 1974–1978: Northern Kentucky Pirhanas
- 1979–1980: Cincinnati Marlins
- 1980–1989: University of Cincinnati
- 1989–2011: University of Arizona; Tucson Ford Aquatics
- 2004, 2008: US Olympic Coach

Accomplishments and honors

Awards
- NCAA Coach of the Year 6 times PAC 10/12 Coach of the Year 11 times USA Swim. Coach of the Year '98; US Olympic Committee; Coach of the Year '98; ASCA Hall of Fame 2008; Paragon Award ISHOF 2018

Frank Busch (February 4, 1951 – September 27, 2026) was an American collegiate, national and Olympic swimming coach, best known for coaching the University of Arizona from 1989 to 2011. He was a coach for the USA Olympic team in 2004 and 2008.

== Biography ==
Busch was born in Cincinnati, Ohio, on February 4, 1951.

He distinguished himself as a swimmer at an early age, setting Ohio age group records while swimming for the Brookwood Country Club at the age of 12 in 1964, at the Kentucky Open Swim Meet. He again placed first and set national records in the 400 yard freestyle and medley relays while swimming for the Cincinnati Marlins and later the Covington YMCA. He would coach both the Marlins and the Brookwood Swim Clubs in his early coaching years. In 1966, while attending St. Xavier Junior High School he set a record for the 100 yard individual medly of 1:03. He graduated from Covington Catholic High School, south of Cincinnati, in 1969.

=== College swimming ===
Busch swam and played Water Polo for Loyola University in Chicago from 1969 to 1973. He played on the first Loyola Water Polo Team that made the (NCAA) Championship and became a 2020 inductee to the Loyola Athletics Hall of Fame. His 1972 team lost to San Jose State 21-6 and the University of New Mexico (17–12) in the finals.

=== Early coaching ===
Busch began his coaching career at age 16 in Edgewood, Kentucky. After three years in summer league coaching at Brookwood Swim Club while he attended college from 1969 to 1974, and four years of AAU coaching for the Northern Kentucky Piranhas from 1974 to 1978, he joined the staff of the Cincinnati Marlins for the 1979–80 season as the associate head coach. The Marlins won the National Team Championship that season and placed six swimmers on the 1980 United States Olympic Team.

=== College coaching ===
From 1980 to 1989, Busch coached at the University of Cincinnati. From 1989 to 2011, he served as the swimming head coach for the Arizona Wildcats at the University of Arizona. His swimmers won 49 NCAA individual titles, 31 NCAA relay titles, and 2 NCAA team championships. While at Arizona, he also led Tucson Ford Aquatics (previously Hillenbrand Aquatics) to several national team championships.

Busch served as an assistant coach for the U.S. Olympic team at the 2004 and 2008 Olympics. In addition to coaching 12 American Olympians during his tenure at the University of Arizona, Busch coached 22 international Olympians, representing 14 countries.

In May 2011, Busch began serving as USA Swimming's National Team Director, providing the overall vision and leadership for the sport's top coaches and athletes. Under his tenure, USA Swimming won 31 medals at the London Games (2012) and 33 medals at the Rio Games (2016). In both of these Summer Games, USA Swimming's successful campaigns represented 30% of Team USA's total medal count. In September 2017, Busch announced his retirement from the director position.

=== Personal life and death ===
Busch was married to Patrice, with whom he had five children. Busch died of a heart attack on September 27, 2026, at the age of 75.

== Awards ==
During his collegiate coaching career, Busch was named Coach of the Year by the NCAA six times, Pac-10 eleven times, USA Swimming (1998), and the USOC (1998). In 2008, he was inducted into the ASCA Hall of Fame, and after retirement in 2018 received the Paragon Award from the International Swimming Hall of Fame.
