= Skip Kenney =

American swimming coach (1943–2022)

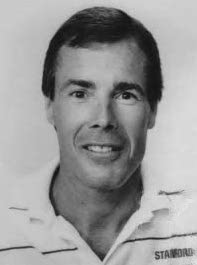
- Kenney c. 1988

Biographical details
- Born: February 24, 1943; Fresno, California, U.S.
- Died: November 28, 2022 (aged 79); Fresno, California, U.S.
- Education: Long Beach State; 1972 Graduate

Coaching career (HC unless noted)
- 1968–1971: Long Beach State; Phillips 66, Asst. Coach
- 1971–1972: Harvard University, Asst.
- 1972–1979: AAU Coaching: Houston Dad's Club; Cincinnati Marlins
- 1979–2012: Stanford University

Head coaching record
- Overall: 243-40 .83 percentage

Accomplishments and honors

Championships
- 7 NCAA Championships; 1984–1987, 1991–1994, 1997–98; 31 straight Pac-10/12 championships (Stanford); 1984, 1988, 1996 Summer Olympics; 1994 World Aquatics Championships

Awards
- CSCAA Coach of the Year (1982, 1985–1987, 1992, 1998); PAC 10 Coach of the Year; Stanford Hall of Fame; Fresno Athletic Hall of Fame; International Swimming Hall of Fame; ASCA Hall of Fame

Allen "Skip" Kenney (February 24, 1943 – November 28, 2022) was an American Olympic and college swimming coach who served as Head Coach of the men's swimming team at Stanford University from 1979 to 2012. In his 33-year dynasty, he coached his teams to 7 NCAA championships and to a remarkable 31 consecutive Pac-10 Conference titles.

== Early education ==
Kenney was born in Fresno, California, on February 24, 1943, the son of Bruce and Jayne Kenney. He played basketball and football for Fresno High School, and though never on the swim team, he did dive competitively. After High School graduation in 1960 and service in the Marines, he spent two years at Fresno City College, completing his education at Long Beach State, where he graduated in 1972.

=== Marine service ===
Kenney served in the United States Marine Corps, receiving a purple heart, and was in combat in Vietnam for 13 months in 1965 to 1966; four months of which were spent as a sniper. He said that he drew on his service in the Marine Corps in his coaching. "Whether you are racing or in combat, for you to be at your best, your mind takes over and your body follows. Your expectations rise."

== Early coaching ==
While attending classes there, he served as an Assistant Coach for the Long Beach College 49ers from 1968–71, while simultaneously coaching Long Beach's Phillips 66 Swim Club. Susan Pedersen was an American gold medalist Kenney coached while at Phillips 66. At both venues, he worked under the mentorship of the gifted Olympic and Collegiate coach Don Gambril who would later coach in several Olympics and at the University of Alabama.

Kenney then served as Asst. Coach at Harvard from 1971–72, when Gambril moved there as Head Coach. Kenney spent 1972–1979 coaching several AAU teams, including working as Head Coach of the Houston Dad's Club Swim Team in Houston, Texas, founded in 1948 and still active, and then the Cincinnati Marlins, an exceptional program that has placed 18 swimmers on Olympic teams since 1968. At the Houston Dad's Club, he coached 1976 Montreal Olympian Renee Magee. While at the Marlins, he mentored 1976 Montreal Olympian Charles Keating III and the 1980 Olympians Glenn Mills, Bill Barret and Kim Carlisle, who were unable to attend due to the American boycott. While coaching the Cincinnati Marlins in 1978–79, Kenney mentored and trained 1984 Los Angeles Olympic 4x100 medley gold and 100-meter backstroke silver medalist Dave Wilson.

== Stanford coaching ==
Kenney was unusual in that he never swam competitively, but was mentored by some exceptional head coaches in his early career, and went to numerous clinics and talks to learn his craft. In his first year at Stanford in 1979, the team went only 3–6 in the regular season, ending the year sixth in the Pac-10. Kenney would not have another losing season, and during his 33-year coaching tenure, Stanford swimmers would win 31 consecutive Pac-10/Pac-12 championships and win the NCAA national title from 1984–1987 and 1991–1994, with his last national title in the 1997–1998 season.

== International coaching ==
Kenney also coached on the international circuit. He was appointed the men's coach for the U.S. team at the 2004 Short Course World Championships. He served as head coach of the United States Men's Swimming Team at the 1996 Summer Olympics in Atlanta, and assistant coach at both the 1984 and 1988 Summer Olympic Games.

== Honors ==
Kenney was inducted into the Stanford Hall of Fame, the Fresno Athletic Hall of Fame, the International Swimming Hall of Fame, and the ASCA Hall of Fame. He was named Pac-10 Coach of the Year 20 times and College Swimming Coaches Association of America (CSCAA) Coach of the Year 6 times. His teams included: 134 All-Americans, 72 NCAA champions, and 23 Olympic athletes. During his tenure, his student-athletes had a 100% graduation rate.

On March 9, 2007, Kenney was suspended indefinitely, with pay, by Stanford after admitting to removing entries for records set by five swimmers (Jason Plummer, Michael McLean, Tobias Oriwol, Rick Eddy, Peter Carothers) that he had disagreements with from the Stanford swimming team's media guide. The team was coached, on an interim basis, by associate head coach Ted Knapp. On April 20, 2007, Stanford announced that Kenney would serve a 60-day suspension without pay and then return to his position as head coach. Kenney issued an apology to the Stanford community.

Kenney retired from coaching at Stanford in 2012, at the age of around 69, enjoying an active retirement with his wife Betty. He died from complications from Alzheimer's on November 28, 2022, in Fresno, California.
