= Frank Elm =

American swim coach (1929 – 2021)

- Elm in 1972, age 52

Biographical details
- Born: October 30, 1929
- Died: November 30, 2021 (aged 92)
- Education: Indiana University Bloomington; 1953 graduate

Playing career
- 1949-1953: Indiana University Bloomington
- Positions: freestyle, medley

Coaching career (HC unless noted)
- 1961-1993: Rutgers University Men
- 1974-1993: Rutgers University Women
- 68, 76, 80: US Olympic Coach

Head coaching record
- Overall: 1961-1972, 79-42, .68 Win % 1961-1992 136-178 .76 Loss % (Rutger's Men)

Accomplishments and honors

Awards
- 1973 ASCA Master's Coaches Award; 2004 ASCA Hall of Fame '98 Rutgers Athletics Hall of Fame

Frank Elm (October 30, 1929 – November 30, 2021) was an American competitive swimmer and a Hall of Fame swimming coach for Rutgers University from 1961 to 1993. He was the first coach of the Rutgers Women's Swimming team from 1974 to 1993, and served on the staff of three U.S. Olympic Teams, as an Assistant in 1968 and 1976, and as Head Coach in 1980.

== Early swimming and instructing ==
Elm was born in New Jersey on October 30, 1929, and grew up as a native of Paterson. He was swimming and helping to instruct swimming by the age of 13 at the local Paterson, New Jersey YMCA. Swimming for the Paterson YMCA, in December, 1947, he was credited with a 19:07 second 40-yard freestyle, and a 57.1 second 100-yard freestyle at a meet in Planefield, New Jersey. In August 1948, Elm received the Lloyd B. Marsh and Robert Wardle Trophies for winning two swimming races during the American Legion Carnival at Pompton Lakes. In March 1949, swimming for the Paterson YMCA, he also won the Junior Men's 120-yard medley event at a New Jersey AAU championship with a time of 1:19.6.

Diverse in his stroke skills, in March 1949, he won the Junior 150-yard individual medley at an AAU meet in Newark, New Jersey with a time of 1:43.4. In the summer of 1951, Elm served as a Swimming Instructor at a YMCA Camp at Spring Lake in Wycoff, New Jersey, and became a certified swimming instructor.

=== Indiana University Bloomington swimmer ===
Elm was a Collegiate All-American at Indiana University in 1951, and would earn All-American honors again. In the summers of 1952 and 1953, Elm continued working as a swimming instructor for the Radburn Association while still a student at Indiana University. He held the National Junior 50-yard freestyle championship, and Indiana State AAU championships. At Indiana, Elm swam under Head Coach Robert A. Royer, a former Indiana University Bloomington swimmer and 1928 graduate who had served as Chairman of the National Collegiate Athletic Association (NCAA). Royer had coached Indiana since 1931, until becoming ill in 1957 when he was replaced by Hall of Fame Coach Doc Counsilman, who had served as an Assistant Coach by 1957.

Elm served for three years in the United States Marine Corps and was a lieutenant. He became a swimmer/coach in the Marine Corps. He received a master's degree from Columbia University.

== AAU age group coaching ==
One of his first coaching assignments was at Summit, New Jersey's YMCA where his men's team won 68 consecutive meets, and his girls team won 70 consecutive meets. He coached the outstanding AAU age group team, the Scarlet Jets, associated with Rutgers, which became known as the Central Jersey Aquatics Club when it merged with Coach Bill Palmer's Shore Athletic Club in the early 1970s. Palmer became Head Coach of the combined team, but Elm continued coaching the club, usually at a separate location in Middlesex. The Central Jersey Aquatic Club was sold by Palmer in 1988 and came under new management.

Elm taught at Memorial Junior High in Fairlawn, New Jersey before coaching Rutgers.

== Coaching Rutgers ==
Replacing Men's Coach Otto Hill, Elm coached Rutgers teams from 1961 though 1993, simultaneously for a period with his AAU age group team, the Scarlet Jets, known as the Central Jersey Swim Club in the early 70's. From 1961 through 1972, his Rutger's men's team captured 11 consecutive winning seasons, achieving an overall record of 79–42. After 1972, the Men's team had significantly fewer wins with mostly losing seasons.

Elm started the Rutger's Women's team, coaching them from 1974 through 1993 simultaneously with the Men's team. Judy Melick, from the class of 1977 was the first woman to swim for Rutgers. Impressively, Elm's women's team started with three successive undefeated seasons from 1975 to 1977, and dominated the Eastern Championships. At the 1977 National Championships, they became the only Eastern team in the East to place in the top ten. An exceptional early record, Elm ended the 1970s with his women's team achieving an impressive 70–20 record.

Nearing the end of his tenure, Elm coached Rutgers during the building of the Busch Campus Sonny Werblin Recreation Center, having some input into its design.

== International coaching ==
Elm served on the staff of three U.S. Olympic Teams, as an Assistant in 1968 and 1976, and as Head Coach in 1980. During his time at Rutgers, he coached the U.S. Pan American Games team in 1967. He coached a couple of U.S. National Teams that in 1975 toured Japan, and in 1981 toured the Soviet Union.

== Top swimmers ==
While coaching Rutgers, Elm mentored swimmers who made the Olympics, including two gold medal winners. He coached several swimmers who competed in the Pan Am Games, with five winning gold medals. Elm's swimmers, Elliot Chenaux, a 1964 Olympian from the class of 1968, and Jose Ferraioli, from the class of 1969, swam for Puerto Rico in Olympic competition. Elm worked with 1964 Tokyo Olympian Phil Riker in the 200-meter butterfly, another native of Paterson, New Jersey. As mentioned later here, Elm also worked for many years with 1972 Munich Olympic competitor in the 400-meter medley relay Judy Melick.

=== Men ===
The Eastern Seaboard Championships, created in 1965 improved Rutger's Athletics, with the contributions of top swimming performers Bill Clark in 1963, Larry Jones and John Wasylyk in 1964, Don Galluzzi, and Marty Flickenger in 1965, and diver Roy Nicholas, an Eastern Champion, in 1964. Gregg Anderson, of the class of 1970, was the high points scorer for Rutgers in the late 1960s, and was an All-American in 1968 and 1969. In the 1968 Eastern Championships, Rutgers placed fourth with top six finishes by Bob Chenaux of the Class of 1966, Dave Feigley of the Class of 1966 in diving, All American sprinters Bruce Ball of the Class of 1967 and Dick Woodrow of the Class of 1966, and Eastern Champion in Diving, Peter Hibbard of the Class of 1967.

=== Women ===
Judy Melick, coached by Elm at Rutgers and in High School with the Scarlet Jets, originally swam with the Rutger's men's team, and was the first Captain of the newly established women's team. As a 1972 Munich Olympian, she swam the breaststroke leg for the gold medal-winning U.S. team in the preliminary heats of the women's 4×100-meter medley relay. However, she was ineligible to receive a medal under the 1972 rules because she did not compete in the event final. Individually, she also competed in the women's 100-meter breaststroke, finishing fifth in the event final with a time of 1:16.34. Fifteen of Elm's Rutger's women were the recipients of All-American honors, many becoming stars. Top women swimmers for Rutgers coached by Elm included Ellen Wallace, a 1972 Olympic trial qualifier and a swimmer at the 1975 World Championships and Pan Am Game, Debbie Franks, Maureen Mortell and Robin Locklair.

=== Honors ===
Elm was inducted into the American Swimming Coaches Hall of Fame in 2004, and the Rutgers Athletics Hall of Fame in 1998. In a more uncommon distinction, in 1973, he was a recipient of the Master Coaches Award from the Swimming Coaches’ Association of America in 1973. Rutger's annual “Frank Elm Invitational” swim tournament named in his honor was hosted through 2017. In 1965, Elm was appointed to the Selection and Nominating Committee for Fort Lauderdale's Swimming Hall of Fame.

He died on the evening of November 30, 2021, in New Jersey at the age of 92.
