= Veronica Malone =

American swimming coach (born 1949)

Veronica Malone (formerly Peter Donovan Malone) (b. 1949) is a former swimming coach from the United States. She served as the head coach and general manager for the Kansas City Blazers Swim Team in Kansas City, Kansas & Missouri from 1975 to 2010. During her career she coached four Olympic gold medalists: Janie Wagstaff, Catherine Fox, Scott Goldblatt and Shannon Vreeland. She was recipient of the USA Swimming Award in 2001.

== Personal life and education ==
Malone graduated from the University of Toledo with an Ohio teacher's degree in business education. She married and had three children. Following retirement from coaching, Malone began gender transition, and is now known as Veronica Malone.

== Career ==
=== Coach ===
While at university Malone coached swimming, three years as assistant and three years at head coach. From 1968 to 1975 Malone was an assistant coach at the Greater Toledo Aquatic Club. From 1975 to 2010 she was head coach of the Kansas City Blazers swim team. Other coaching roles included:

- 1981, 1985, 1988, 1991, 1993: USA national team, assistant coach
- 1988, 1992, 1996: USA Olympic teams, consulting coach
- 1994: USA team, world championships - head coach
- 1996: USA swimming junior team - head coach
- 1999: USA women's swimming 1999 Pan American Games - head coach
- 2004: USA women's swimming - head coach

=== Roles ===
Roles for USA Swimming included:

- 1982–1986 and 1992–1996: board of directors member
- 1984–2008: Olympic international operations committee member
- 1992–2004: national steering committee
- 2004–2008: senior development committee chair
- National time standards committee chair

She was also American Swimming Coaches Association (ASCA) board of directors 1991–1994 and 1995–2004 and vice-president from 1995–2001, 2002–2007

== Awards ==
- 1977–2009: ASCA certificate of excellence recipient, including the gold award for over 20 years of national level coaching
- 2001: USA swimming award for outstanding contribution to the United States and to the sport of swimming
- 2009: ASCA hall of fame inductee
- American Swimming Coaches Association Hall of Fame
- USA Swimming's "Top 25 most influential people in the history of swimming"

== Transgender rights advocacy ==
Since transitioning Malone has become an advocate for transgender rights. She has had leadership roles in Parents and Friends of Lesbians and Gays (PFLAG) and her local chapter of Gay, Lesbian and Straight Education Network (GLSEN).
