= Dennis Pursley =

American swimming coach

Biographical details
- Born: Louisville, Kentucky, U.S.
- Education: University of Alabama 1972

Playing career
- 1968–1972: University of Alabama
- Position: breaststroke

Coaching career (HC unless noted)
- 1972–1974: University of Alabama; Asst. Coach under Don Gambril
- 1974–1979: Lakeside Swim Club; Louisville, Kentucky
- 1979–1981: Cincinnati Marlins
- 1981–1983: Australian Institute of Sport
- 1984–1987: Olympian Swim Club; Edmonton, Alberta
- 1989–2003: USA Swimming National Team Director
- 2003–2006: Brophy East Swim Team
- 2008–2012: British National Team
- 2012–2019: Alabama Crimson Tide Swimming & Diving

Accomplishments and honors

Championships
- Regional Championship Title; Top 10 National Ranking (Lakeside Swim Club)

Awards
- 1980 ASCA Coach of the Year; 1980 USA Olympic Swimming Coach; United States Olympic Committee Chairman's "Coaching Award" for 2000; 25 most influential people in the history of USA Swimming in 2003; Inducted into the American Swimming Coaches Hall of Fame in 2006

Dennis Pursley was a competitive swimmer and is a retired American swimming coach who served as head coach of the combined men's and women's teams at the University of Alabama from 2012 to 2019 and was a five time Olympic coach. Several athletes Pursley coached have set world records, national records, and won medals in the Olympics and international competition.

== Early education and swimming ==
Pursley attended and graduated Trinity High School in Louisville, Kentucky, where he was a state champion several years, a team captain and All American. He graduated in 1968, and enrolled at the University of Alabama.

Swimming for the University of Alabama, he earned All-Southeastern Conference honors and the 1969 SEC 200 breaststroke title. He completed a bachelor's degree in 1972 and a master's degree in 1973.

== Coaching career ==
=== University of Alabama ===
While competing as a swimmer for Alabama, Pursley was an assistant to Crimson Tide Hall of Fame Coach Don Gambril and John Foster in the 1970s. He was Head Swim Coach at Alabama for both the Men's and Women's teams from 2012 to 2019. Later in the 1984 Olympics, his former high school swimmer at Lakeside Swim Club, Mary T. Meagher, would be coached by U.S. Olympic Men and Women's Head Coach Don Gambril.

=== Lakeside Swim Club ===
After leaving Alabama, Pursley coached the Lakeside Swim Club in Louisville, Kentucky, from 1974 to 1979. Originally a rock quarry, the swim club became a center for competitive swimming by the 1940s, and has since mentored ten Olympians.

== Coach for local and international teams ==
He became part of the coaching staff of the 1979 USA Pan American Games team. Pursley coached Mary T. Meagher during his time at Lakeside Swim Club from around from 1975 to 1979 and later coached her for several months while he was at the Cincinnati Marlins in preparation for the 1980 Olympics. In addition to Meagher, he coached Glenn Mills, onto the USA Olympic swimming team in 1980.

He later became head coach of the Cincinnati Marlins from 1979 to 1981, a highly successful club, founded in 1961, with frequent competitions and quality facilities located in Northern Kentucky and Cincinnati. Pursley successfully led the Marlins team to national championship team titles three times. Prior to the 1984 Olympics, Pursley was named as the first head coach of the Australian Institute of Sport (AIS) where he remained from 1981 to 1983. AIS athletes Pursley coached included Mark Stockwell who won half the medals for Australia in the 1984 Summer Olympics.

Between 1984 and 1987, in a short stint, Pursley coached the Olympian Swim Club in Edmonton, Alberta.

=== USA Swimming National Director ===
Pursley was appointed the first National Team Director for USA Swimming in 1989, and held the position for 14 years, through 2003.

He served as the British Team coach for the 2012 Summer Olympics. In 2016, Pursley coached Kristian Gkolomeev to the Rio Olympics in the 50m and 100m freestyle. He retired from coaching in April, 2019.

== Honors and awards ==
- 1980 ASCA Coach of the Year
- 1980 USA Olympic Swimming Coach
- United States Olympic Committee Chairman's "Coaching Award" for 2000
- 25 most influential people in the history of USA Swimming in 2003
- Inducted into the American Swimming Coaches Hall of Fame in 2006
