= Red Barr =

American swim coach (1908 – 1971)

Alfred Richard "Red" Barr
- Barr in c.1971

Biographical details
- Born: August 14, 1908; Avon, Ohio, US
- Died: June 12, 1971 (aged 62); El Paso, Texas, US
- Education: Oberlin College 1930

Playing career
- 1926-30: Oberlin
- Positions: basketball; baseball (third base)

Coaching career (HC unless noted)
- 1930–1940: Connellsville High School; Asst. Football, Track Coach
- 1936–1942: Connellsville High School; Swim Team Coach
- 1947–1971: Head Coach SMU
- 1963: U.S. Swim Team; Pan Am Games; Brazil
- 1968: U.S. Olympic Team; Alternate Coach

Accomplishments and honors

Championships
- 17 SWC Championships; 15 Consecutive, (1957-1971)

Awards
- 1975 Texas Sports Hall of Fame; 2008 Texas Swimming & Diving Halls of Fame; 2011 SMU Athletic Hall of Fame; 2013 SWC Hall of Fame

Alfred "Red" Barr (August 14, 1908 – June 12, 1971) was an American Hall of Fame swim coach for Southern Methodist University (SMU). He coached the Southern Methodist swimming team for twenty-four years from 1947 through 1971, where he led the Mustangs to seventeen Southwestern Conference Championships, including fifteen consecutive championships from 1957 through 1971.

Barr was born on August 14, 1908, to Bertha May Walker and William James Barr in the small community of Avon, Ohio, outside Cleveland, where he attended Avon High School and graduated in 1926. Demonstrating a high level of academic achievement, he was the valedictorian of his High School class.

He attended Oberlin College, graduating in 1930 with an A.B. degree. Though he was not involved in competitive swimming, he lettered in the sports of both basketball and baseball, captaining Oberlin College's 1929-30 basketball team, and playing third-base on the 1930 baseball team. He received a master's degree from New York University in 1937.

== Naval service ==
After coaching Track and Swimming at Connellsville High School, in the greater Pittsburgh area, Barr began in the US v-5 Naval Program in November, 1942, and remained in the service through Feb. 1, 1946 primarily with the rank of Lieutenant. While coaching at SMU, he remained in the Naval reserve until 1963, reaching the rank of Commander. Barr served as an Assistant Physical Instructor during his early years with the Navy in Athens, Georgia, and his responsibilities included teaching swimming techniques to naval flight cadets. While in the Navy in the early 1940's, Barr served under Matty Bell, a Hall of Fame S.M.U. football coach, at the Georgia Pre‐Flight School, and Bell later helped in the process of bringing Mr. Barr to S.M.U. in 1946. After his high school coaching stint and service in the US Navy, Barr returned to Ohio in Spring, 1946 where he married Philadelphia's Helen Paul "Paulie" Cleaver, whom he met during his Naval service.

== Coaching ==
=== Connellsville High ===
After completing Oberlin College, he taught Physical Education while coaching at Connellsville High School for 12 years from 1930-1942. The School is now known as the Connellsville Area High School in Connellsville, Pennsylvania. His Coaching career began at Connellsville in 1930 as an Assistant Football Coach, and he also coached field events for the Track Team, and served as a trainer for the basketball team during his twelve-year tenure at the school.

Beginning in 1936, when it first became a varsity sport, he coached swimming at Connellsville, with considerable success, winning the Western Pennsylvania Interscholastic Athletic League (WPIAL) Championships five times between 1938 and 1942. In their WPIAL championship win in 1939, the team set an all time WPIAL league scoring high mark with 49 points. An outstanding swimmer in 1942 included Harold Stefl, 200-yard freestyle champion. Another 1942 standout swimmer was Bob Munson, who set a school record in the 100-yard backstroke of 1:05.6 when the team won their fifth WPIAL championship that year. One of Barr's outstanding swimmers was Grant Buttermore, who swam a state record 100-yard breast stroke time of 1:12.6 at the WPIAL Meet in Pittsburgh in February, 1941, leading Connellsville to their fourth consecutive WPIAL championship. Outstanding swimmers in 1942 included record holder in breaststroke James Dwire, and Harold Stefl, 200-yard freestyle champion. The team's 1942 WPIAL championship win was close, with Vandergrift High School's swim team coming within seven points of Connellsville's 49 point total. The team also performed well in the 1943 WPIAL championship under new interim coach W.L. Lewis with most of Barr's former swimmers in competition. During one period near the end of Barr's tenure, Barr's Connellsville swim team won 40 consecutive dual meets. In the 1956-7 season Connellville dropped varsity swimming as a sport, but resumed WPIAL swimming in the 1970-71 season.

=== SMU coach ===
After completing his successful high school swim coaching career, and active Naval service, Barr was SMU Head Coach from 1947 to 1971, where he led his teams to 17 Southwestern Conference Championships, the most of any coach in the conference to that date. Fifty of Barr's swimmers and divers received All-American honors, and as outstanding swimmers they led SMU to finish in the top 10 in the NCAA eight times in Barr's tenure as coach between 1962 and 1971, his last nine years. He coached the US men's swimming team to a win at the Pan Am games in 1963. Olympic swimmers he coached included Doug Russell and Ronnie Mills. Barr also coached Richard Quick, an SMU Team Captain in his Senior Year around 1965, and a 400-IM medley winner in a Southwestern Conference Championship. Quick would go on to an exceptional career as both an Olympic Coach and University of Texas and Stanford women's coach, leading his two women's teams to twelve NCAA championships, after serving as an SMU Assistant Coach from 1971 through 1975 under Barr's successor, SMU Hall of Fame Head Coach George McMillion.

In his last ten years of coaching, Barr's SMU teams lost only two meets in dual competition, and while dominating their region won 15 consecutive Southwestern Conference Championships from 1957 through 1971. At one point in his career, Coach Barr's SMU swim teams had 75 consecutive dual meet wins.

In 1966, Barr along with Walter Kaspareit started the Junior Mustang Swim Team. An outstanding youth program, by the late 60's, the team would begin to send a few of its swimmers to the Olympic trials every four years. The Junior Mustangs would be later known as the Dallas Swim Club, under Coach Richard Quick in 1971, and would practice at both the SMU pools and the Highland Park High School pool.

== Service to the swimming community ==
Barr was Chair of the Amateur Athletic Union (AAU) swimming rules committee, served on the committee for the Pan American Games for swimming, and significantly served as a Chairman of the Southwestern Amateur Athletic Union swimming committee from 1950 through 1971, and as President from 1969 through 1971. He managed the 1958 Women's AAU Indoor Championships, the 1960 NCAA Championships, the National Indoor AAU meet in 1967, and the February 1971 National AAU Championships at Loos Pool in Dallas. He conducted swim clinics in South Africa in 1969 and in Israel in October 1970.

Barr died of a heart attack around 6:30 AM on the morning of June 12, 1971 in the company of his wife Paulie, at a hotel in El Paso, Texas while in town to coach a Junior Olympic meet for the Dr. Pepper Swim Club of Dallas. He was 62. He had had a prior heart attack in July 1963 but returned to coaching. He was replaced by George McMillion, who had been one of his swimmers at SMU and had served as one of Barr's Assistant Coaches. Barr was survived by his wife Paulie, two sons and two daughters. His sons both swam for the SMU team.

== Honors ==
He was inducted into the SMU Athletic Hall of Fame in 2011, the Southwest Conference Hall of Fame in 2013, the Texas Sports Hall of Fame in 1975 and the Texas Swimming & Diving Halls of Fame in 2008. Late in his career, Barr received the Big D Award of the All-Sports Association of Dallas in 1971. After Barr's death, SMU named its new outdoor Olympic size 50-meter pool, the Red Barr Pool, which included a diving well in his honor. The pool has since been replaced by the new Robson & Lindley Aquatics Center and the Barr-McMillion Natatorium, whose name honors both Barr's legacy and that of George McMillion, the SMU coach that succeeded him.
