= Paul Bergen =

US swimming coach

Paul Bergen is an Olympic swimming coach from the United States. He has coached in the USA and Canada, winning coach of the year honors in both countries in different years. He was inducted into the International Swimming Hall of Fame as an Honor Coach in 1988. He has coached swimmers to 21 World, 24 USA and 13 Canadian records.

Bergin attended the University of Wisconsin-Milwaukee, and graduated with a degree in Physical Education. He began his coaching career as a High School swim coach.

He was the founder of the Pepsi Cincinnati Marlins in Ohio, and coached the Nashville Aquatic Club in Tennessee, the University of Texas, Tualatin Hills in Oregon, and Etobicoke in Ontario, Canada. Among the athletes he has coached are: 1972 Olympic medalists Deena Deardurff, and Jenny Kemp with the Cincinnati Pepsi Marlins, triple Olympic gold medalist Tracy Caulkins at the Nashville Aquatic Club and Inge de Bruijn. He has coached world record holders Alice Jones, Joan Pennington, Jill Sterkel, and Hall of Famer Kim Linehan.

== International coaching ==
Bergin coached four World Championships, and once at the Commonwealth Games. He was an Olympic coach in 1980, 1984, 1988 and 2000. He served on USA coaching staffs to World Championships in 1975, 1978 and 1982, and with Canada in 1986.

In 2010, Deena Deardurff revealed that Bergen had sexually abused her from the time she was 11 until she stopped his abuse at the age of 15. As a result of Deardurff's revelations, Tulatin Hills Swim Club removed Bergen's name from its premier swimming event in 2013.

== See also ==
- List of members of the International Swimming Hall of Fame
