= Bill Palmer (swim coach) =

American swim coach (1908 – 1971)

- Palmer in August, 1976

Biographical details
- Born: June 13, 1938; West Long Branch, New Jersey
- Died: December 30, 2020 (aged 82); Durango, Colorado
- Education: Monmouth University

Coaching career (HC unless noted)
- 1961: Shore Aquatic Club
- 1970–1988: Central Jersey Aquatic Club; Formerly Shore Aquatic Club
- 1996-: Durango Masters Swim Team

Accomplishments and honors

Championships
- 1976 AAU National Championship (Central Jersey Aquatic Club)

Awards
- Coach of the Year (United States Masters Swimming)

Bill Palmer (June 13, 1938 – December 30, 2020) was an American swim coach. He coached the AAU Central Jersey Aquatic Club from 1961 to 1988, leading them to an AAU National Championship in 1976. Palmer's Shore Aquatic Club, which he founded in 1961, became known as the Central Jersey Aquatic Club around 1972 when it merged with Rutger's swimming coach Frank Elm's Scarlet Jets, an AAU team. During his long coaching career, which included coaching the Durango Masters after 1996, Palmer coached several American Olympic swimmers including 1968 Olympic team alternate Cathy Corcione, as well as 1976 Olympians Kathy Heddy and gold medalist Wendy Boglioli. South African swimmer Jonty Skinner trained with Palmer at the Central Jersey Aquatic Club before becoming a world record holder in the 100-meter freestyle at the Senior AAU Nationals in Philadelphia in August 1976.

== Education ==
Palmer was born on June 13, 1938, in West Long Branch, New Jersey, to Hazel and Francis Palmer. He participated in prep football and track, graduating from Long Branch High School in 1955 and then attended the Fishburne Military School in Waynesboro, Virginia. His parents operated Marpal Disposal in Tinton Falls, New Jersey, where he worked between swimming assignments. In college he went to the University of North Carolina at Chapel Hill for a year, but graduated from Monmouth University, where several of his future New Jersey swimmers would compete.

== Coaching swimming ==
Palmer in 1960

One of Palmer's earliest swim coaching assignments after graduating from Monmouth University, was his Driftwood by the Sea Swimming Team which won the Shore Junior Championships against eight other clubs at Driftwood Beach Club on the Jersey Shore in Sea Bright, New Jersey, in late July 1959. In June 1960, as coach of Driftwood Swim Club, Palmer attended the National Indoor Championship at Yale University. In August 1962, Palmer's Driftwood Beach Club Swimming Team soundly won the Quadrangular swimming meet championship at the Surfrider Beach Club for the third straight year, winning 12 of 20 individual events and taking seven of eight relay races. In 1963, Palmer's Driftwood team had eight of ten of the local newspaper Daily Record's All Star Swim team members which included future stars Cathy Corcione and Sue Halfacre.

=== Central Jersey Aquatic Club ===
He began coaching swimming for his more memorable team, New Jersey's Shore Aquatic Club in 1961 in Monmouth County, New Jersey. A regional power, by 1963 the Shore Aquatic Club was unofficially ranked second among age group clubs in New Jersey behind the Summit YMCA team. In the 1970s the team combined with the Scarlet Jets Club, coached by Frank Elms of Rutgers University, and Palmer continued coaching the new club to be known as Central Jersey Aquatic Club through 1988. For a number of years through the mid-1970's, the team still met in the summers at the Driftwood Beach Club, depending on pool availability. In 1968, and again in 1976, Central Jersey Aquatic Club's Coach Frank Elms served as an Olympic coach.

In 1972, Palmer's Shore Aquatic Club, having already become known as the Central Jersey Aquatic Club, and considered a top New Jersey program, met at the Peddie School pool in Hightstown, New Jersey, and in the summer met at an outdoor pool at Sea Bright, New Jersey. Coach Palmer noted that the team suffered from a lack of swimming facilities in their area. Palmer led the Shore Aquatic Club team then known as the Central Jersey Aquatic Club in August, 1976 to an excellent showing in the National Championship of the American Athletic Union in both the senior women's and the combined categories for men and women. The CJAC women's team placed second nationally and the combined men and women's team placed fourth.

In 1988, Palmer sold the club, and two outstanding New Jersey Shore Aquatic Club former swimmers, Corinna Weinkofsky and Cathy Corcione took over as coaches. Palmer moved to Durango, Colorado in 1996, and began coaching the Durango Masters Swim Team.

== Outstanding swimmers ==
Wendy Boglioli

The most outstanding swimmer on Palmer's 1976 Central Jersey Aquatic Club team was Wendy Boglioli, who at the 1976 Montreal Olympics captured a gold medal in the 400-meter freestyle relay and won a bronze medal in the 100-meter butterfly. Kathy Heddy, who swam with Wendy Boglioli at Central Jersey Aquatic Club, would also swim in the 1976 Olympics, and though she did not become an Olympic medalist, she would break the World Record in the 800-meter Long Course freestyle relay in 1976. In total, Central Jersey Aquatic Club, under Palmer as Head Coach including its two prior programs, had three Olympic team members, but as many as twelve who qualified for the Olympic trials from 1968 through 1980. An early swimmer with the Shore Aquatic Club under Palmer was John Clews, who swam for Red Bank High School and qualified for the State Finals in 1973, taking a second place in the 200-yard freestyle.

Jonty Skinner, who swam for Central Jersey Aquatic Club under Palmer in 1976, set a World Record at the U.S. Senior National Championships in Philadelphia on August 14, 1976, of 49.44 seconds in the 100-meter freestyle twenty days after the 1976 Montreal Olympics, breaking Olympian gold medalist Jim Montgomery's newly set record of 49.99 seconds in the event. In the Summer of 1979, Skinner served as an assistant coach at Central Jersey Athletic Club, working under Palmer, who had been a former mentor and coach. Skinner would pursue a coaching career at the University of Alabama and with USA Swimming. Corinna Weinkofsky, who took over coaching the Central Jersey Aquatic Club when Palmer left in 1988, also swam for the club under Palmer, and was a seven-time state High School champion and a four-time All American at Arizona State.

Olympic team alternate Cathy Corcione in '68

Cathy Corcione, who swam for Princeton, was the Shore Swimming Club's first Olympian under Palmer in 1968, ranking first in the world in the 100 freestyle, fifth in the 200 IM, and second in the 200 backstroke, an event in which she broke the American record. As a 15-year old Junior at Long Branch High School, Corcione qualified for the 1968 Mexico City Olympics in the 400-meter freestyle event as an alternate, but did not get the opportunity to swim in Mexico City due to an overabundance of talent that year. Susan Halfacre, a 1972 Olympic Trial swimmer, swam for the University of Florida and for Palmer as well. Ken Winfield was another outstanding swimmer for Palmer, who attended both the 1968 and 1972 Olympic Trials, swam for Red Bank High School, and Michigan State, and was ranked eighth in the world in the 200 butterfly, but did not swim in the Olympics. Another outstanding swimmer for the Central Jersey Aquatic Club was Judy Melick, who participated in the 1972 Munich Olympics, but may have swum primarily under Central Jersey Aquatic Club Coach Frank Elm before his club was combined with Palmer's Shore Aquatic Club.

Bill's athletic pursuits included biking, skiing, and triathlons. He participated in nearly 200 triathlons, which included the Ironman in Kona, Hawaii.

== Honors ==
Bill was honored as a Coach of the Year by United States Masters Swimming, both with his Central Jersey Aquatic Club team in New Jersey, and his Durango Masters team in Colorado.

Palmer died on December 30, 2020, in Durango, Colorado. He was survived by his wife, Mary Anne Nelson, four children, three girls and a boy, and four grandchildren.
