= Jim Montrella =

American swimmer & coach (born 1940)

Biographical details
- Born: August 4, 1940 (age 86); Los Angeles, California, U.S.
- Education: Cal State University Long Beach

Playing career
- 1958-1961: Long Beach City College
- Positions: freestyle, freestyle relay

Coaching career (HC unless noted)
- 1959-1964: Lakewood YMCA
- 1964-1977: Lakewood Aquatics Club
- 1972: Asst. Olympic Coach; Colombia, South America
- 1976: Asst. Olympic Coach, U.S. Women
- 1978-1979: Indian River Community College, Athletic Director; Men and Women's; Head Swim Coach
- 1980-1997: Ohio State University; Head Women's Coach
- 1997-2000: Assistant Men's Swimming Coach

Accomplishments and honors

Championships
- 2 NJCAA Championships; Indian River (1978,1979); Five Big 10 Championships; Ohio State (1982-1986)

Awards
- ASCAA Coach of the Year; Lakewood Aquatics (1969, 1971); Big 10 Coach of the Year; Ohio State (1985, 1991)

Jim Montrella (born August 4, 1940) is an American former swimmer and a club, college, and Olympic swim coach, best known for coaching the Lakewood Aquatics Club from 1959 to 1978 in the Los Angeles area, and the women's swimming team at Ohio State from 1980 to 1997.

== Early life and swimming ==
Jim Montrella graduated Millikin High School in Long Beach, California in 1958, where, coming late to the sport, he did not begin swimming for the team until his Junior year. Montrella attended Long Beach City College, where he continued on the swim team, but later graduated nearby Cal State Long Beach.

=== Long Beach City College swimmer ===
Swimming for the Long Beach City College Vikings in April, 1963, Montrella set a conference record in the 4 x 100-yard freestyle relay with a combined team time of 3:27.7, while swimming last in the anchor position. Montrella also competed in the 100 freestyle, and stayed with the team through his Senior year.

== Coaching Lakewood YMCA tarpons ==
Still in high school at 17, around 1958, Montrella started working at, and later coaching and teaching swimming at Southern California's Lakewood YMCA, in Lakewood, in Los Angeles County. The YMCA had recently built a new outdoor, heated 60 by 300 foot pool. During his time at Lakewood YMCA, he served as Aquatics Director, gave lessons and ran a swim team, later known as the Lakewood Tarpons, mostly for members under 16, which he coached through 1964 before starting the Lakewood Aquatics Team. By 1962, his Lakewood team's workouts would include dryland exercises and a three-quarter mile run.

Montrella continued to work with the Lakewood Tarpons through his senior year at Long Beach City College. Montrella served a short period of service with the U.S. Coast Guard, while stationed at Terminal Island, between September 1964, and March 1965, where he continued to coach the Lakewood team weekends, and during liberty. He received a "Distinguished Service Award" from the Lakewood Junior Chamber of Commerce in January 1965 for his work coaching the Lakewood YMCA team.

== Coaching Lakewood Aquatics Club ==
His Lakewood team grew and gained a reputation particularly after Montrella formed Lakewood Aquatics with Jerry Labonte, which officially began as a separate club on May 3, 1964 with around 110 members. Montrella coached the Lakewood Aquatic Club from 1964 to 1978. The team continued to meet at Lakewood's heated outdoor Mayfair Pool facility. Lakewood Aquatics was formed from combining two teams, the local Dolphins team coached by Jerry Labonte, and Montrella's Lakewood YMCA team, the Tarpons. Labonte served as the first president of Lakewood Aquatics, and Montrella as head coach. Lakewood Tarpons and later Lakewood Aquatics won the Junior Olympics eighteen times under Montrella's leadership. The Southern California Junior Olympics were held at nearby Belmont Pool in Belmont Plaza in Long Beach. By 1969, the Lakewood Aquatics team still had around 100 members ranging from 6 to 20 years of age.

=== Lakewood Olympians ===
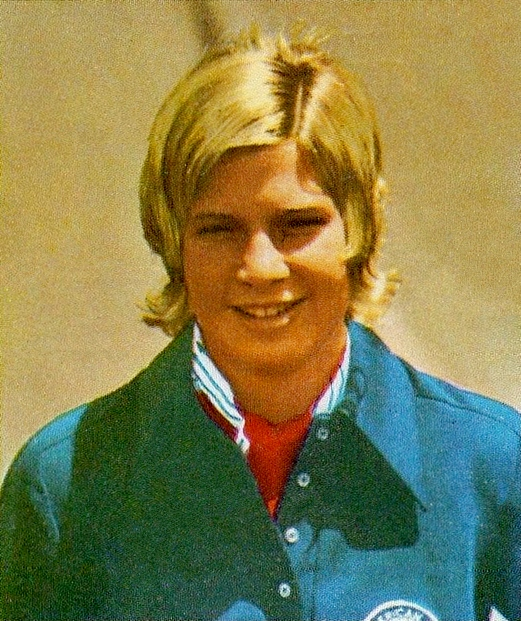
'72 Olympic medalist Susie Atwood

Two of his more exceptional women swimmers at Lakewood Aquatics, Susie Atwood and Kimla M. Brecht, were on the 1968 US Olympic team. In 1972, Susie Atwood won two medals at the Munich Olympic Games, breaking the world record in the 200-meter backstroke. With stroke diversity on the Lakewood team, Montrella's Lakewood swimmer Kimla Brecht set an American record in the 200-yard breaststroke. Another of Montrella's swimmers at Lakewood, Kurt Krumpholz, broke the U.S. and World record in the preliminary competition in the 100 meter freestyle at the 1972 Montreal Olympic trials, but placed fifth in the finals and did not make the Olympic team. A highly competitive program, the more elite swimmers at Lakewood Aquatics, and some of the intermediate competitors swam as much as 12,000 meters or around eight miles for 100 and 200-meter sprinters, and 20,000 meters or around 12.4 miles for top distance swimmers.

While at Lakewood Aquatics, Montrella also coached Olympian Steve Genter, who won gold in the 1972 Munich Olympics in the relay, and silver medals in the 200 and 400 freestyle despite having had surgery for a collapsed lung around five days before he competed. In its full tenure under Montrella, the Lakewood Aquatic Club trained three world-record holders, seven Olympians, and 28 American record holders.

In September 1973, Montrella brought a group of swimmers selected from the National Swimming Championships held in Louisville, Ky to swim a competition first in Peru and then in Santiago, Chile, during the violent coup by Agusto Pinochet to oust Chilean president Salvador Allende.

== Olympic coaching ==
Montrella served as an assistant swimming coach, for the U.S. Women's team at the 1976 Montreal Olympics.

While completing his B.A., Jim coached the City of Lakewood for a brief period while Lakewood Aquatic Club was meeting at Mayfair Pool, owned by the City of Lakewood. Later, Montrella completed his Masters degree. The Mayfair Pool was preferred by Montrella because it was an outdoor facility, but Montrella had hoped for improvements or better maintenance in the pool that was built around 1958, where he had coached the Lakewood Aquatics team for a long period.

In 1976, Montrella served as the U.S.A. coach for the International competition in Paris.

== Coaching Indian River State College ==
In 1978-79, Jim began coaching swimming at Indian River Community College in Fort Pierce, Florida, and served as Athletics Director, responsible for helping to staff, schedule, coordinate and budget ten sports programs. He was officially announced as Swimming Head Coach in June 1977, replacing Head Coach Dick Wells, and officially started on July 1, 1978.

Montrella won the National Junior College Athletic Association (NJCAA) Championships both years while serving as Indian River coach, and by 1978, Jim's first year, the team had won the championships four times. He maintained a disciplined team, and after Indian River won the Junior College National Swimming and Diving Championships in April 1978, he removed four swimmers from Indian River for violating a team policy. Two of his top swimmers at Indian River, Sue Zach, who was voted the No. 1 Jr. College Swimmer in the Nation, and Helmuth Levy, a Colombian national who was the No. 1 Jr College Men's swimmer, were supportive of Montrella's rather disciplined approach to the team. Another one of Jim's swimmers at Indian River, Deena Schmidt, was an All-American and set NJCAA records in the 100-meter and 200-meter butterfly. A former Olympic swimmer, Schmidt had won a gold medal in the 1972 Munich Olympics on the 400-meter relay team, and would later coach at San Diego State University. While at Indian River, Montrella was NJCAA Coach of the year in both 1978 and 1979.

=== Coaching philosophy ===
Like most successful coaches, Montrella expected his swimmers to be on time for practice. He stressed the need to train swimmers for multiple events, and usually multiple strokes, and enforced certain rules of behavior, particularly when his swimmers attended meets.

== Coaching Ohio State University ==
In his most high-profile coaching tenure, he served as the Women's Coach at Ohio State University from 1980 to 1997, where he led the team to five consecutive Big Ten Championships. One of his more exceptional swimmers, Holly Humphrey, was the Ohio NCAA Woman of the Year in 1994. Forty-eight of Montrella's swimmers were recognized as NCAA All-Americans.

=== Asst. Coach, University of Southern California ===
After ending his coaching tenure at Ohio State in 1997, he worked as an assistant coach at the University of Southern California under Mark Schubert. Later he served as an assistant coach under former University of Southern California swimmer and Olympian Murray Rose with the exceptional club team, the Mission Viejo Nadadores in Mission Viejo, California beginning around 2011. While at Mission Viejo, he worked with twelve year old age group swimmers and the weaker swimmers to focus on their performance. He and his wife Bev, who was an assistant serving under him at Ohio State and had once helped coach the Mission Viejo team, retired to Mission Viejo where he had lived for a number of years.

== Business owner and innovator ==
In the 1960s Montrella started his business, Modern Swimming Concepts, where he manufactured hand paddles with removable and adjustable wrist straps in sizes that varied by color codes. They became popular worldwide in many high-profile swim programs. He also owned the business Competitive Aquatics Supply, with wholesaling and retailing outlets that carried swimming supplies for swimmers, divers, water polo players, and synchronized swimmers.

== Swimming community service ==
Montrella coached and managed the US Olympic Development Camps in Colorado Springs. A member of ASCA since 1959, he has served as a past Vice President and board member. He also served from 1972 to 1996, as a member of the USA Swimming Olympic International Operating Committee. Montrella also served as a for over twenty USA National Swimming Teams. He worked for USA Swimming as a Consultant, deemed a Master Coach, where he travelled to clubs throughout the United States working with coaches, advising them on both USA swimming by-laws, and coaching techniques.

== Honors ==
In 2005, Montrella was inducted into the American Swimming Coaches Association Hall of Fame. In 2009, he became a member of The Ohio State University's Athletics Hall of Fame. In 2023, Montrella was inducted into the City of Long Beach Aquatic Capital of American Hall of Fame.
