= Gregg Troy =

American Olympic swimming coach

- Florida Gators swimming coach Gregg Troy in March 2008.

Current position
- Title: Head coach
- Team: Cali Condors

Biographical details
- Born: December 19, 1950 (age 75); Bellefonte, Pennsylvania, U.S.

Coaching career (HC unless noted)
- 1977–1997: Bolles School
- 1995: Pan Am Games Team
- 1996: U.S. Olympic Team (Asst.)
- 1998–2018: University of Florida
- 1999: Pan Am Games Team
- 2008: U.S. Olympic Team (Asst.)
- 2012: U.S. Olympic Team
- 2019-2020: Cali Condors

Accomplishments and honors

Championships
- SEC Women's Championship (2002, 2009); NCAA Women's Championship (2010); SEC Men's Championship (2013, 2014, 2015, 2016, 2017, 2018)

Awards
- NCAA Men's Coach of the Year (2002, 2004); NCAA Women's Coach of the Year (2010); SEC Men's Coach of the Year (2000, 2002, 2007, 2010, 2013); American Swim Coaches Ass'n Coach of the Year (2010); National Collegiate & Scholastic Swimming Trophy (2010)

Gregg Troy (born December 19, 1950) is an American professional and Olympic swimming coach. As of April 2021, he was the head coach for the Cali Condors, which was part of the International Swimming League. Until 2018, he was the head coach of the Florida Gators swimming and diving teams of the University of Florida. Previously, Troy served as an assistant coach for the U.S. Olympic men's swim team in 1996 and 2008, and he was the head coach of the 2012 U.S. Olympic men's swim team that competed at the 2012 Summer Olympics in London.

== Early life and education ==
Troy was born in Bellefonte, Pennsylvania, near State College, in 1950. He earned a Bachelor of Arts degree in government from Texas Christian University in Fort Worth, Texas in 1972, and later earned a Master of Arts degree in history education from Jacksonville University in Jacksonville, Florida in 1987.

== Coaching career ==
Troy was the head coach of the Florida Gators men's swimming and diving teams at the University of Florida in Gainesville, Florida from 1999-2018, and the head coach of the Gators women's team from 1998. Before he joined the Gators in 1998, he was the head coach of the swim teams of The Bolles School in Jacksonville, Florida, a position he held for twenty years. During his tenure with Bolles, the prep school's swim teams became perennial state champions, winning fifteen boys team championships and eleven girls team championships.

He has served as a women's assistant coach at the 1996 Summer Olympics in Atlanta, Georgia, the men's head coach for the 1999 Pan American Games in Winnipeg, Manitoba, and the men's assistant head coach for the U.S. Olympic team at the 2008 Summer Olympics in Beijing, China. In fourteen seasons with Gators women's squad and thirteen years with the Gators men's team, Troy has guided Gators swimmers to more than sixty SEC individual titles, more than 200 SEC Academic Honor Roll selections and more than 550 All-America honors. In 2009, the Gators women's team won the SEC team championship; in 2010, they won the NCAA national team championship.

Troy has coached sixty-eight Olympians, and multiple world champions and world record holders, including most notably Ryan Lochte. Coached by Troy, Lochte developed into a swimming force on the international level, winning eleven medals, including five gold medals in three Olympic Games, and holding multiple current world records and multiple current world championship titles.

In December 2010, the U.S. Olympic Committee appointed Troy to serve as the head coach of the U.S. men's swimming team for the 2012 Summer Olympics to be held in London, England. Troy's men's Olympic team won a total of sixteen medals in seventeen events.

== Career highlights ==
• Golden Goggle Award for Coach of the Year (2021)
• U.S. Olympic team men's head coach (2012)
• U.S. Swimming Coach of the Year (2010)
• ASCA Coach of the Year (2010)
• NCAA Women's Swimming Coach of the Year (2010)
• SEC Men's Swimming Coach of the Year (2010)
• U.S. national team head coach for Pan Pacific Games (2010)
• U.S. Olympic team men's assistant coach (2008)
• SEC Men's Coach of the Year (2007)
• U.S. national team women's assistant coach for FINA World Short Course Championships (2004)
• NCAA Men's Coach of the Year (2004)
• NCAA Men's Coach of the Year (2002)
• SEC Men's Coach of the Year (2002)
• U.S. national team men's head coach for World Championships (2001)
• SEC Men's Coach of the Year (2000)
• U.S. national team men's head coach for Pan American Games (1999)
• U.S. national team women's head coach for World Championships (1998)
• U.S. Olympic & Swimming Developmental Coach of the Year (1997)
• U.S. Olympic team women's assistant coach (1996)
• U.S. national team head coach for Pan American Games (1995)
• Thailand Olympic team head coach (1992)
• Coached 68 Olympians
• Coached over 230 All-American swimmers
• Coached swimmers who set 155 U.S. and international records

Source for highlights:

== Head coaching record ==
=== Women's swimming and diving ===
Record table
| Season | Team | Overall | Conference | Standing | Postseason |
|---|---|---|---|---|---|
Florida Gators (Southeastern Conference) (1999–present)
| 1998–99 | Florida | 8–2 | 2–2 | 4th | NCAA 8th |
| 1999–00 | Florida | 9–3 | 3–2 | 3rd | NCAA 19th |
| 2000–01 | Florida | 11–2 | 5–2 | 3rd | NCAA 8th |
| 2001–02 | Florida | 12–2 | 5–1 | 1st | NCAA 7th |
| 2002–03 | Florida | 12–1 | 5–1 | 2nd | NCAA 5th |
| 2003–04 | Florida | 10–2 | 5–2 | 3rd | NCAA 4th |
| 2004–05 | Florida | 9–2 | 3–2 | 3rd | NCAA 4th |
| 2005–06 | Florida | 11–2 | 5–2 | 3rd | NCAA 10th |
| 2006–07 | Florida | 10–2 | 5–1 | 3rd | NCAA 7th |
| 2007–08 | Florida | 11–1 | 5–1 | 2nd | NCAA 6th |
| 2008–09 | Florida | 10–2 | 4–1 | 1st | NCAA 7th |
| 2009–10 | Florida | 10–2 | 4–1 | 2nd | NCAA 1st |
| 2010–11 | Florida | 6–4 | 1–2 | 2nd | NCAA 7th |
| 2011–12 | Florida | 7–2 | 3–2 | 3rd | NCAA 10th |
| 2012–13 | Florida | 3–4 | 2–3 | 3rd | NCAA 6th |
| 2013–14 | Florida | 5–3 | 3–2 | 3rd | NCAA 6th |
| 2014–15 | Florida | 6–2 | 5–1 | 3rd | NCAA 9th |
| Florida: | | 150–38 | 65–28 | | |
| Total: | | 150–38 | | | |
National champion Postseason invitational champion Conference regular season champion Conference regular season and conference tournament champion Division regular season champion Division regular season and conference tournament champion Conference tournament champion

=== Men's swimming and diving ===
Record table
| Season | Team | Overall | Conference | Standing | Postseason |
|---|---|---|---|---|---|
Florida Gators (Southeastern Conference) (2000–present)
| 1999–00 | Florida | 7–4 | 2–3 | 2nd | NCAA 9th |
| 2000–01 | Florida | 9–5 | 2–5 | 3rd | NCAA 8th |
| 2001–02 | Florida | 10–4 | 5–2 | 2nd | NCAA 4th |
| 2002–03 | Florida | 9–3 | 4–2 | 2nd | NCAA 6th |
| 2003–04 | Florida | 9–2 | 5–1 | 2nd | NCAA 6th |
| 2004–05 | Florida | 12–1 | 4–1 | 2nd | NCAA 5th |
| 2005–06 | Florida | 10–3 | 5–1 | 2nd | NCAA 5th |
| 2006–07 | Florida | 8–5 | 4–2 | 2nd | NCAA 4th |
| 2007–08 | Florida | 9–3 | 3–2 | 2nd | NCAA 8th |
| 2008–09 | Florida | 8–2 | 4–1 | 2nd | NCAA 5th |
| 2009–10 | Florida | 9–0 | 4–0 | 2nd | NCAA 5th |
| 2010–11 | Florida | 6–3 | 3–1 | 2nd | NCAA 5th |
| 2011–12 | Florida | 5–0–1 | 3–0–1 | 2nd | NCAA 8th |
| 2012–13 | Florida | 7–0 | 5–0 | 1st | NCAA 6th |
| 2013–14 | Florida | 5–0 | 8–0 | 1st | NCAA 3rd |
| 2014–15 | Florida | 6–1 | 5–1 | 1st | NCAA 5th |
| Florida: | | 132–36–1 | 63–22–1 | | |
| Total: | | 132–36–1 | | | |
National champion Postseason invitational champion Conference regular season champion Conference regular season and conference tournament champion Division regular season champion Division regular season and conference tournament champion Conference tournament champion

== See also ==
- Florida Gators
- History of the University of Florida
- List of Texas Christian University alumni
- List of University of Florida Olympians
- University Athletic Association
