= Richard Quick =

American swimming coach

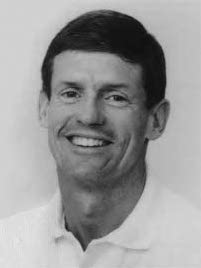
- Quick c. 1988

Current position
- Title: Head coach

Biographical details
- Born: January 31, 1943; Akron, Ohio, U.S.
- Died: June 10, 2009 (aged 66); Austin, Texas, U.S.
- Education: Southern Methodist University

Playing career
- 1962-1966: Southern Methodist University; Coach Red Barr

Coaching career (HC unless noted)
- 1971-1975: SMU (M) (Assistant)
- 1976-1977: SMU (W)
- 1977-1978: Iowa State (M)
- 1978-1982: Auburn (M&W)
- 1982-1988: Texas (W)
- 1988-2005: Stanford (W)
- 2007-2009: Auburn (M&W)

Head coaching record
- Overall: 123-10 Dual Meets (Stanford); 192-34 Overall Head Coach (.850 Winning %); 160-25 Women's Head Coach (.865 Winning %)
- Tournaments: 1984, 1988, 1992, 1996, 2000 and 2004 Summer Olympics; 1982, 1986, 90, 94 World Championships

Accomplishments and honors

Championships
- 5 NCAA titles 1984-1988 (UT); 7 NCAA titles 1988-2005 (Stanford); 1 NCAA title 2009 (Auburn)

Awards
- NCAA Coach of the Year (1984–86, 89, 92)

Richard Walter Quick (January 31, 1943 – June 10, 2009) was a Hall of Fame head coach for the women's swim teams at the University of Texas from 1982 through 1988 and at Stanford University, from 1988 through 2005. In an unprecedented achievement, Quick's Women's teams at Texas and Stanford won a combined 12 NCAA National championships, with his Men and Women's team at Auburn winning his final championship in 2009. His teams won a combined 22 Conference championships. He was a coach for the United States Olympic swimming team for six Olympics—1984, 1988, 1992, 1996, 2000 and 2004.

== Early swimming ==
Quick was born on January 31, 1943 to Walter and Barbara Quick in Akron, Ohio. He started swimming in Austin, Texas around the age of eight, primarily under Bill Crenshaw at the Austin Aquatics Club. When the family moved to Wichita, Kansas, he began more serious competition at the Wichita Swim Club and Wichita East High School under Robert Timmons. Timmons would later become known as the legendary track coach at Kansas University who coached Olympian Jim Ryun, though his High School swimming teams won seven state titles.

When Quick's father Walter, a tire company official was transferred to Dallas, Richard became a top swimmer at Highland Park High School in University Park, Texas. While at Highland Park, Quick had improved on national age group records in the 200-yard Individual Medley, and 100-yard butterfly, and led in High School finals in the 200 IM, 100-yard fly, 400 freestyle, 200 freestyle, 100 back, and 100 breastroke. In college, Quick was recruited for a scholarship and swam for nearby Southern Methodist University where he made All-Southwest Conference and swam under SMU Hall of Fame Coach Red Barr while majoring in Physical Education. Quick was an SMU Team Captain in his Senior Year, and a 400-IM medley winner in a Southwestern Conference Championship, and swam at SMU with his brother Dave, a freestyle sprinting specialist. Richard was an All-American swimmer at SMU in 1965 and 1966.

== Coaching ==
In one of his earliest coaching assignments immediately after college graduation, Quick coached Spring Branch Memorial High School in Houston, Texas, beginning in 1965, where he led the team to six state championships by 1971.

After Assistant coaching at SMU from 1971 through 1975, and coaching the Women's team from 1976 through 1977 in its initial year, he had a brief head coaching position with Iowa State from 1977 through 1978, then coached both the Men's and Women's team at Auburn from 1978-1982. He served as head women's swimming coach at the University of Texas from 1982 through 1988, where he excelled, leading his teams to five consecutive NCAA titles from 1984 through 1988.

=== Stanford women ===
While coaching the Stanford women from 1988-2005, Quick won an exceptional seven non-consecutive NCAA titles in 1989, 1992, 1993, 1994, 1995, 1996, and 1998. He developed 35 NCAA champions, winning five CSCAA Coach of the Year honors and three Pac-10 Coach of the Year awards.

At the 2000 Sydney Olympics he led the women's team to sixteen medals. His most successful swimmer was Stanford competitor Jenny Thompson, who won ten Olympic Golds. Other notable Olympians coached by Quick include Auburn swimmer Ambrose "Rowdy" Gaines, Texas swimmers Tiffany Cohen, and Jill Sterkel and Stanford swimmers Summer Sanders, Misty Hyman, Lea Loveless, Catherine Fox, and Lisa Jacob. He also helped train Dara Torres and Steve Lundquist for Olympic competition. Jill Sterkel would later coach the University of Texas Women's Team from 1993 through 2006. His Olympic athletes brought home an impressive total of 59 Olympic medals.

=== Auburn ===
During his initial stint at Auburn from 1978-1982, Quick led the Auburn University Tigers Mens and Women's team to four national top ten finishes. On March 8, 2007, Auburn University announced that Quick would return to the Tigers to take over as head coach for the swimming and diving teams after David Marsh left. Quick was Marsh's coach when he was a backstroker for Auburn. In March 2007 Marsh won his 12th NCAA National title, tying his former coach and mentor for the most (Division I) titles won by an NCAA Coach. Quick broke the tie the following year, winning a 13th title while coaching at Auburn.

=== Honors ===
Quick is a member of SMU's Distinguished Alumni. In 2000 he was inducted into the International Swimming Hall of Fame. He was a three time American Swimming Coaches Association (ASCAA) Coach of the Year and a five time NCAA Coach of the Year.

Quick initially retired to Austin in 2005, but in 2007 came out of retirement to coach Auburn. In December 2008 Quick was diagnosed with an inoperable brain tumor. He died on the evening of June 10, 2009 in Austin, Texas. His 2008–09 Auburn team won the NCAA National title in March, 2009.

== Collegiate coaching career ==
- Auburn Men's and Women's head coach (2007–09)
- Stanford Women's head coach (1988–2005)
- Texas Women's head coach (1982–1988)
- Auburn Men's and Women's head coach (1978–1982)
- Iowa State Men's head coach (1977–1978)
- Southern Methodist Women's head coach (1976–1977)
- Southern Methodist Men's assistant coach (1971–1975)
