= Don Gambril =

American swimming coach

- Gambril, as 1984 Olympic Swim Coach

Biographical details
- Born: January 2, 1934; Altamont, Kansas, U.S.
- Education: California State University, Los Angeles ('60)

Playing career
- 1951-1952: East Los Angeles Jr. College
- 1952-1953: Occidental College
- 1956-1957: U.S. Navy; All Navy Swim Team
- Position: freestyle

Coaching career (HC unless noted)

Swimming Coach 1958-1990
- 1958-1963: Rosemead High School; California
- 1958-1965: Rosemead Swim Club; Evenings
- 1963-1965: Arcadia High School
- 1965-1967: Pasadena City College; City of Commerce Club
- 1967-1971: Long Beach State; Phillips 66 Swim Club
- 1968-1984: U.S. Olympic Coach; 5 Summer Olympics
- 1971-1973: Harvard University
- 1973-1990: University of Alabama
- 1990-2007: Assoc. Athletic Director; University of Alabama

Head coaching record
- Overall: 48-3 (Long Beach State); 237 of 269 (Alabama).864 Percentage; 300 total wins, all teams

Accomplishments and honors

Championships
- 3 Southeastern Conference team titles: Men-(1982, 1987); Women –(1985); Top Ten NCAA Finishes-16; U.S. Olympic Asst. Coach 1968-1980; Olympic Head Coach 1984

Awards
- USA Swimming Award; 4 time SEC Coach of the Year; 1985 Scholastic Coach of the Year; International Swimming Hall of Fame

Donald Lee Gambril (born January 2, 1934) is an American former Hall of Fame swimming coach who is best known for coaching the University of Alabama from 1973 to 1990. His Alabama teams had top ten NCAA finishes eleven times, 3 Southeastern Conference titles, and were the runner-up at the NCAA Championship in 1977. Earlier, his Long Beach State teams had top ten NCAA finishes four times from 1968-71. He had the rare distinction of serving as a U.S. Olympic coach in five Olympics from 1968 to 1984.

== Education and early swimming ==
Gambril was born on January 2, 1934, in Altamont, Kansas, and after moving to El Sereno, California, attended El Sereno's Woodrow Wilson High School where he was on the swim team and played football, starting as a Center by his Senior year. He grew up shortly after the depression with a family of limited means where he learned the importance of a work ethic and the necessity of thrift.

Gambril attended and swam for East Los Angeles Jr. College, from 1951–52, before transferring to Occidental College where he continued to swim for a year. At East Los Angeles, he specialized in distance swimming, making the Junior College All-American team in the 1500-meter event. After marrying his wife Teddy on March 14, 1953, he went to work full time and then enlisted in the Navy reserves before graduating college. Returning to complete his studies at California State, Los Angeles, he also played center and linebacker on their Football team for a year.

=== U.S. Naval service ===
From around 1956-57, he served in the Navy and swam for the All-Navy "B" team, competing occasionally in intercollegiate swimming competition and water polo. He swam on the winning 800 free relay at the All-Navy championships. While serving on the U.S. Navy Destroyer USS Cunningham, he was able to attend though not compete in the swimming portion of the 1956 Melbourne Olympics. He believed he obtained the best conditioning of his life training with the U.S. Navy Swim Team, and was deeply affected by the opportunity to view Olympic swimming competition. Gambril briefly coached J.V. Football at El Monte High School and worked as a lifeguard at the end of 1957 upon his return from Naval service.

=== Completing college ===
Returning to college studies around 1957 after his service in the Navy, he completed his BA and Master's degree while attending California State at Los Angeles around 1960. The school was about 12 miles West of Rosemead High School where Gambril was coaching.

== Early coaching positions ==
=== Rosemead High and Swim Club ===
In 1958, after his Navy service, Don had his first position as a fulltime teacher, instructing Social Studies at California's Rosemead High School, where he also coached J.V. Football. In the same year, he started Rosemead Swim Club, which he would coach in the evening after school hours, and where he would attract exceptional swimming talent. Still pursuing his teaching credentials, he received a provisional teaching certificate to take the opening. In the Spring of 1958, he also took over coaching the Rosemead High School's swim team, a role that would soon direct his career focus. He would eventually lead the team to five league championships. He remained as coach and teacher at Rosemead through around 1963. Top women swimmers coached by Gambril at Rosemead by 1961 included Jeanne Hallock Craig, Sharon Stouder, and Pam Crotwell.

=== Arcadia High School ===
In September 1963, Don took over the swim coach position as well as coaching Football and teaching P.E. and History at Arcadia High School, a more affluent school with a more competitive sports program and student athletes who could train full time without having to work after school. Gambril had success at Arcadia, with a few of his athletes becoming California Interscholastic Federation titlists. Gambril was gaining visibility in the Southern California swimming community as well as in neighboring states.

== Coaching California colleges and clubs, 1965-71 ==
=== Pasadena City College ===
In 1965, Pasadena City College looked to Gambril to take over their Head Coaching position. Gambril was interested in a chance to coach a college team, but worked hard to find a suitable replacement at Arcadia, eventually settling on Ray Peterson, who would do an exceptional job, and coach at Arcadia for thirty years. Gambril became known as a coach who would work hard to find outstanding coaches to replace him when he made a move. In his first full year at Pasadena City College, the team won the league championship in 1966, and won it again in 1967. Future UCLA coach Ron Ballatore would be mentored as an Assistant Coach under Gambril for one year at Pasadena City College around 1966.

=== City of Commerce ===
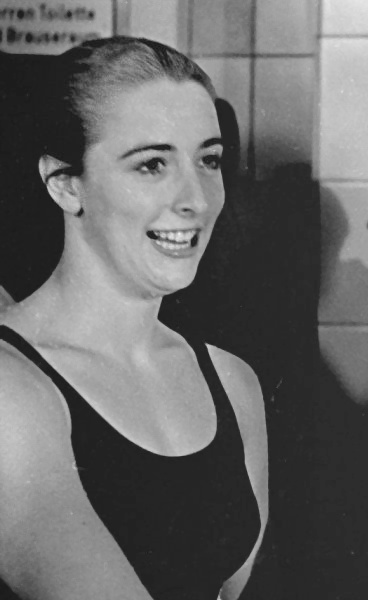
Olympian Sharon Stouder, 1965

Around the same time, as his service at Pasadena City College, Gambril had an opportunity to coach a Club team that had demonstrated great achievement, as their Women's team had attended National tournaments, and Olympic trials. He took over the City of Commerce Swimming Club team around 1965, which was composed of many Rosemead Swim Club members. Gambril had previously founded the Rosemead Club in 1958. Commerce Swimming Club was located in the small town of City of Commerce, just outside Los Angeles, and though the town was small, it was prosperous and had a beautiful new swimming facility completed in 1963. The team included 1964 Olympic gold medalist and world record holder Sharon Stouder in butterfly, who swam for Don for over five years, and 1964 world record holder Patty Caretto in distance freestyle. Other female Olympians he coached at City of Commerce included 1964 Olympic breast stroker Sandy Nitta, and 1964 Olympian Jeanne Hallock Craig. Looking back on their experience, the women at City of Commerce believed Gambril was a brilliant marketer who convinced them they could be the best in the world, and remembered him as a "tough but tender-hearted leader." Gambril stayed with both teams through 1967.

=== Long Beach State ===
Gambril was head coach at Long Beach State from 1967 to 1971, where he mentored Assistant Coach Skip Kenney, who would become a highly accomplished coach for Stanford University. After a losing season before Gambril began coaching, Long Beach State's dual meet record during Gambril's tenure was a remarkable 48-3.

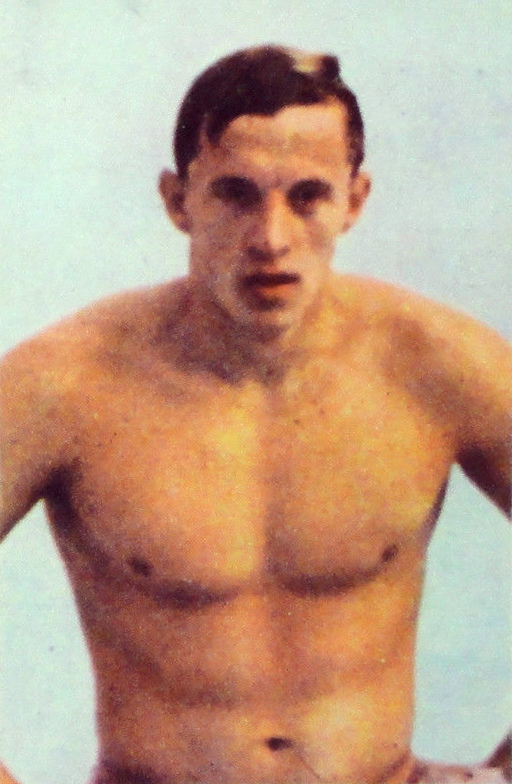
72 Olympian Hans Fassnacht

The team would have more than one world record holder, including John Sylvio Fiolo, who had set the world record for the breast stroke in February 1968 before coming to swim with Don at Long Beach State. 1972 Olympian Silver medalist Hans Fassnacht, from Germany, would set the world record for the 400-meter free in 1968 under Don's guidance at Long Beach. Fassnacht would set the world record for the 200 meter butterfly in 1970 with a time of 2:03.3, bettering Mark Spitz's standing record by .6 seconds. Another Long Beach State swimmer, Gunnar Larsson, a 1972 two-time Olympic gold medalist, would break the record for the 400-meter free in September 1970 at the European Championship in Barcelona, improving on his own 1968 Mexico City Olympic time. With such outstanding swim talent, Long Beach State became so widely known that 1972 seven-time gold medalist Mark Spitz met Gambril and gave a verbal commitment to swim for the team around 1968 in his Senior year in High School, before deciding to swim for Indiana University. Under Gambril's guidance, Long Beach State College had four NCAA Division I top ten finishes with a seventh place in 1968, a seventh place in 1969, a fifth place in 1970, and another fifth place in 1971. Hall of Fame Coach Dick Jochums, who would coach University of Arizona, coached Long Beach State after Gambril went to Harvard in 1971.

=== Phillips 66 Long Beach ===
During the same period he was coaching at Long Beach State, Gambril started and coached the Phillips 66 Club team in Long Beach, training them at Belmont Plaza Swimming Pool. Phillips 66 won three National men's club championships in '68, '69, and '70. A few of Phillips 66 original members had come from Long Beach State College.

== Harvard University ==
Following Long Beach State, Gambril began a two-year stint from 1971 to 1973 as head coach at prestigious Harvard University, where Skip Kenney followed him to again serve as Assistant Coach. Harvard won the Ivy League Title during Gambril's tenure and beat Yale for the first time in years.

== Olympic and International coaching ==
He was the 1984 U.S. Olympic Coach and Assistant U.S. Olympic Coach in 1968, 1972, 1976, and 1980. While in the Navy, Gambril was a spectator for the swimming competition at the 1956 Melbourne Olympics. In 1991, he coached the American National 1991 World Championship team.

Gambril coached many well-known Olympic swimmers, including Mark Spitz, Sharon Stouder, Gunnar Larsson (Sweden), Matt Biondi, Nancy Hogshead, Jonty Skinner (South Africa), and Hans Fassnacht (Germany). He coached three-time butterfly gold medalist Mary T. Meagher, when he was U.S. Head Coach for the 1984 Olympics. He coached 1964 Canadian Olympian Barbara Hounsell, who swam for a period with the Whittier Swim Association in the Los Angeles area and 1972 Olympic 100-meter Bronze medalist Robin Backhaus.

== University of Alabama coach ==
In 1973, Gambril became head coach at the University of Alabama, where he coached the men's team for 17 years and the women's team for 11 years, retiring from coaching in 1990. He had an overall record with Alabama of 237 wins and 32 losses. After his start in 1973, in his fourth year, he took the 1977 Alabama Swim team to the NCAA finals, finishing second. During his tenure, he also coached future Hall of Fame swimmer and Alabama Swim team three-time MVP Jonty Skinner (1975-1977), who would break the 100-meter freestyle world record in 1976 three weeks after the summer Olympics. Skinner was unable to attend the 1976 Montreal Olympics as South Africa, his native country, was banned from attending due to apartheid.

During Gambril's seven-teen year tenure at Alabama, the swim team had 11 top ten NCAA finishes, five times the number required to be made a member of the American Swim Coaches Hall of Fame.

In 1981, Gambril had a heart attack, and underwent quintuple bypass surgery to save his life. He changed his diet, lost weight, and made a thorough recovery, continuing to coach Alabama swimming for another nine years.

After serving seventeen years as Swim Coach at Alabama through 1990, Gambril served six years, through around 1997, as the Associate Athletic Director at Alabama where he helped to manage sports programs with the exclusion of football, men's basketball, and gymnastics for women. In his last coaching position he coached the U.S. Swim team at the World Championships in Perth, Australia.

== Honors ==
He was inducted into the International Swimming Hall of Fame and received the USA Swimming Award in 1983. Gambril was Scholastic Coach of the Year in 1985, and was made SEC Coach of the Year four times. In 1998, he was inducted into the Alabama Sports Hall of Fame, and in 1987, was inducted into his alma mater California State University's Hall of Fame. In 1996, Gambril was one of the first nominees inducted into the Occidental Aquatics Hall of Fame.

== Swimming community service ==
Gambril served on the United States Olympic Committee, and the AAU Men's and Women's Swim Committees. He has served on the United States Swimming Board of Directors, and the Rule Committee for the NCAA. He also served on the board of the U.S. Anti-Doping Agency.

=== Coaches mentored by Gambril ===
With a long history of coaching many championship teams, Gambril excelled in mentoring his assistant coaches, and worked with a number of future coaches who would make great contributions to swimming. Besides mentoring Stanford coach Skip Kenney, who worked under him at Long Beach, Harvard and Phillips 66 as mentioned earlier, he mentored coaches Dick Jochums of Arizona who coached under him for eight years at Phillips 66, and Burt Kanner, a sixteen-year San Marino High School swim Coach who assisted him at Los Angeles Swim Club in 1966-67. Princeton coach C. Rob Orr swam for Gambril at Phillips 66 for eight years, Coach Dennis Pursley of the Cincinnati Pepsi-Marlins and Lakewood Swim Clubs swam and coached with Gambril at the University of Alabama, and Pepsi-Marlins and Santa Clara Swim Club coach Jay Fitzgerald was an Alabama assistant coach under Gambril. San Jose swim club coach and 100-meter record holder Jonty Skinner swam for Gambril at Alabama, and Irvine Aquatics and Saddleback College Coach Flip Darr assisted Gambril at Phillips 66. Darr coached accomplished Olympic Gold Medalist Shirley Babashoff, among others.

In his retirement, Gambril made the short move from Tuscaloosa to Northport, Alabama. As of 2020, he continued to try to exercise with light strength training and walking.

== See also ==
- List of members of the International Swimming Hall of Fame
