= Swimming at the 1968 Summer Olympics – Men's 4 × 100 metre medley relay =

Men's 4 × 100 metre medley relay at the Games of the XIX Olympiad
- Venue: Alberca Olímpica Francisco Márquez
- Dates: 26 October 1968 (heats & final)
- Competitors: 80 from 18 nations
- Winning time: 3:54.9 WR

Medalists
1st place, gold medalist(s)		Charlie Hickcox, Don McKenzie, Doug Russell, Ken Walsh, Ronnie Mills*, Chet Jastremski*, Carl Robie*, Don Schollander*	United States
2nd place, silver medalist(s)		Roland Matthes, Egon Henninger, Horst-Günter Gregor, Frank Wiegand	East Germany
3rd place, bronze medalist(s)		Yuri Gromak, Vladimir Nemshilov, Vladimir Kosinsky, Leonid Ilyichov, Viktor Mazanov*, Nikolay Pankin*, Yury Suzdaltsev*, Sergey Gusev* *Swimmers who played in the heats only. Under 1968 Olympic rules, they did not receive a medal.	Soviet Union

The men's 4 × 100 metre medley relay event at the 1968 Olympic Games took place on October 26. This swimming event uses medley swimming as a relay. Because an Olympic size swimming pool is 50 metres long, each of the four swimmers completed two lengths of the pool, each using a different stroke. The first on each team used the backstroke, the second used the breaststroke, the third used the butterfly stroke, and the final swimmer used freestyle (restricted to not allow any of the first three strokes to be used, though nearly all swimmers use front crawl regardless).

The first swimmer must touch the wall before the next can leave the starting block, and so forth; timing of the starts is thus important.

== Results ==
=== Heats ===
Heat 1

Place	Swimmers	Time	Notes
1	Kishio Tanaka, Nobutaka Taguchi, Satoshi Maruya, Kunihiro Iwasaki (JPN)	4:04.3	
2	Viktor Mazanov, Nikolay Pankin, Yury Suzdaltsev, Sergey Gusev (URS)	4:04.8	
3	Jim Shaw, Bill Mahony, Tom Arusoo, Sandy Gilchrist (CAN)	4:06.0	
4	Leonardo Baremboin, Alberto Forelli, Luis Nicolao, Carlos van der Maath (ARG)	4:08.4	
5	László Cseh Sr., Sándor Szabó, István Szentirmay, Gábor Kucsera (HUN)	4:08.8	
6	César Filardi, José Sylvio Fiolo, João Lima Neto, José Roberto Aranha (BRA)	4:11.1	

Heat 2

Place	Swimmers	Time	Notes
1	Ronnie Mills, Chet Jastremski, Carl Robie, Don Schollander (USA)	4:03.4	
2	Roland Matthes, Egon Henninger, Horst-Günter Gregor, Frank Wiegand (GDR)	4:04.1	
3	Reinhard Blechert, Gregor Betz, Lutz Stoklasa, Wolfgang Kremer (FRG)	4:04.7	
4	Hans Tegeback, Thomas Johnsson, Bo Westergren, Lester Eriksson (SWE)	4:12.2	
5	Tony Asamali, Amman Jalmaani, Leroy Goff, Roosevelt Abdulgafur (PHI)	4:15.7	
6	Gerald Evard, Nicolas Gilliard, Ayis Capéronis, Pano Capéronis (SUI)	4:20.6	
7	Francisco Ramis, José Ferraioli, Gary Goodner, Jorge González (PUR)	4:27.6	

Heat 3

Place	Swimmers	Time	Notes
1	Karl Byrom, Ian O'Brien, Robert Cusack, Mike Wenden (AUS)	4:04.8	
2	Santiago Esteva, José Durán, Arturo Lang-Lenton, José Antonio Chicoy (ESP)	4:06.8	
3	Joseph Jackson, Roger Roberts, Martyn Woodroffe, Bobby McGregor (GBR)	4:07.7	
4	José Joaquín Santibáñez, Felipe Muñoz, Mario Santibáñez, Rafaél Cal (MEX)	4:10.0	
5	Franco Del Campo, Massimo Sacchi, Antonio Attanasio, Pietro Boscaini (ITA)	4:10.3	

=== Final ===
Place	Swimmers	Time	Notes
1	Charlie Hickcox, Don McKenzie, Doug Russell, Ken Walsh (USA)	3:54.9	WR
2	Roland Matthes, Egon Henninger, Horst-Günter Gregor, Frank Wiegand (GDR)	3:57.5	
3	Yuri Gromak, Vladimir Nemshilov, Vladimir Kosinsky, Leonid Ilyichov (URS)	4:00.7	
4	Karl Byrom, Ian O'Brien, Robert Cusack, Mike Wenden (AUS)	4:00.8	
5	Kishio Tanaka, Nobutaka Taguchi, Satoshi Maruya, Kunihiro Iwasaki (JPN)	4:01.8	NR
6	Reinhard Blechert, Gregor Betz, Lutz Stoklasa, Wolfgang Kremer (FRG)	4:05.4	
7	Jim Shaw, Bill Mahony, Tom Arusoo, Sandy Gilchrist (CAN)	4:07.3	
8	Santiago Esteva, José Durán, Arturo Lang-Lenton, José Antonio Chicoy (ESP)	4:07.3	
