= Swimming at the 1968 Summer Olympics – Men's 100 metre butterfly =

Men's 100 metre butterfly at the Games of the XIX Olympiad
- Venue: Alberca Olímpica Francisco Márquez
- Dates: 20 October 1968 (heats & semifinals); 21 October 1968 (final)
- Competitors: 47 from 21 nations
- Winning time: 55.9 OR

Medalists
1st place, gold medalist(s)		Doug Russell	United States
2nd place, silver medalist(s)		Mark Spitz	United States
3rd place, bronze medalist(s)		Ross Wales	United States

The men's 100 metre butterfly event at the 1968 Olympic Games took place between 20 and 21 October. This swimming event used the butterfly stroke. Because an Olympic size swimming pool is 50 metres long, this race consisted of two lengths of the pool.

== Results ==
=== Heats ===
Heat 1

Rank	Athlete	Country	Time	Note
1	Doug Russell	United States	57.3	
2	Vladimir Nemshilov	Soviet Union	59.1	
3	Antonio Attanasio	Italy	1:00.0	
4	John Thurley	Great Britain	1:00.7	
5	Ayis Capéronis	Switzerland	1:00.9	
6	Joseph Meyten	Belgium	1:02.2	
7	Andrew Loh	Hong Kong	1:06.5	

Heat 2

Rank	Athlete	Country	Time	Note
1	Joseph Jackson	Great Britain	59.7	
2	Gary Goodner	Puerto Rico	1:00.3	
3	Ron Jacks	Canada	1:00.5	
4	Sergey Konov	Soviet Union	1:00.8	
5	João Lima Neto	Brazil	1:02.3	
6	Ramiro Benavides	Guatemala	1:03.1	

Heat 3

Rank	Athlete	Country	Time	Note
1	Ross Wales	United States	58.7	
2	Yury Suzdaltsev	Soviet Union	59.3	
3	Avraham Melamed	Israel	59.4	
4	Horst-Günter Gregor	East Germany	59.8	
5	István Szentirmay	Hungary	1:01.0	
6	Leroy Goff	Philippines	1:02.0	
7	Salvador Vilanova	El Salvador	1:06.4	

Heat 4

Rank	Athlete	Country	Time	Note
1	Satoshi Maruya	Japan	58.1	
2	Martyn Woodroffe	Great Britain	59.7	
3	Werner Freitag	West Germany	1:00.1	
4	Graham Dunn	Australia	1:01.6	
5	Donnacha O'Dea	Ireland	1:02.8	
6	Guðmundur Gíslason	Iceland	1:03.3	
7	Friedrich Jokisch	El Salvador	1:10.5	

Heat 5

Rank	Athlete	Country	Time	Note
1	Mark Spitz	United States	58.5	
2	Yasuo Takada	Japan	1:00.0	
3	José Ferraioli	Puerto Rico	1:00.6	
4	Angelo Tozzi	Italy	1:00.6	
5	Ingvar Eriksson	Sweden	1:00.6	
6	Tomas Becerra	Colombia	1:02.2	
7	Bob Loh	Hong Kong	1:06.5	

Heat 6

Rank	Athlete	Country	Time	Note
1	Lutz Stoklasa	West Germany	59.2	
2	Robert Cusack	Australia	59.6	
3	Tom Arusoo	Canada	59.8	
4	Mario Santibáñez	Mexico	1:01.7	
5	Peter Feil	Sweden	1:02.3	
6	Maximiliano Aguilar	Mexico	1:04.0	
7	Rubén Guerrero	El Salvador	1:10.1	

Heat 7

Rank	Athlete	Country	Time	Note
1	Luis Nicolao	Argentina	59.3	
2	Bo Westergren	Sweden	59.9	
3	Arturo Lang-Lenton	Spain	1:00.7	
4	Eduardo Orejuela	Ecuador	1:00.9	
5	Giampiero Fossati	Italy	1:01.7	
6	Lee Tong-shing	Taiwan	1:05.2	

=== Semifinals ===
==== Semifinals 1 ====
Rank	Lane	Name	Nationality	Time	Notes
1		Mark Spitz	United States	57.4	
2		Lutz Stoklasa	West Germany	58.5	
3		Joseph Jackson	Great Britain	59.3	
4		Avraham Melamed	Israel	59.6	
5		Werner Freitag	West Germany	59.9	
6		Bo Westergren	Sweden	59.9	
7		José Ferraioli	Puerto Rico	1:00.9	
8		John Thurley	Great Britain	1:01.2	

==== Semifinals 2 ====
Rank	Lane	Name	Nationality	Time	Notes
1		Satoshi Maruya	Japan	58.0	
2		Vladimir Nemshilov	Soviet Union	59.0	
3		Martyn Woodroffe	Great Britain	59.5	
4		Tom Arusoo	Canada	59.6	
5		Ingvar Eriksson	Sweden	59.9	
6		Antonio Attanasio	Italy	1:00.3	
7		Ron Jacks	Canada	1:00.5	
-		Luis Nicolao	Argentina	DNS	

==== Semifinals 3 ====
Rank	Lane	Name	Nationality	Time	Notes
1		Doug Russell	United States	55.9	
2		Ross Wales	United States	58.2	
3		Yury Suzdaltsev	Soviet Union	58.9	
4		Robert Cusack	Australia	59.2	
5		Yasuo Takada	Japan	59.8	
6		Gary Goodner	Puerto Rico	1.00.1	
7		Angelo Tozzi	Italy	1:00.8	
-		Arturo Lang-Lenton	Spain	DNS	

=== Final ===
Rank	Athlete	Country	Time	Notes
1	Doug Russell	United States	55.9	OR
2	Mark Spitz	United States	56.4	
3	Ross Wales	United States	57.2	
4	Vladimir Nemshilov	Soviet Union	58.1	
5	Satoshi Maruya	Japan	58.6	
6	Yury Suzdaltsev	Soviet Union	58.8	
7	Lutz Stocklasa	West Germany	58.9	
8	Robert Cusack	Australia	59.8	

Key: OR = Olympic record
