= Swimming at the 1968 Summer Olympics – Men's 100 metre backstroke =

Men's 100 metre backstroke at the Games of the XIX Olympiad
- Venue: Alberca Olímpica Francisco Márquez
- Dates: 21 October 1968 (heats & semifinals); 22 October 1968 (final)
- Competitors: 37 from 26 nations
- Winning time: 58.7 OR

Medalists
1st place, gold medalist(s)		Roland Matthes	East Germany
2nd place, silver medalist(s)		Charlie Hickcox	United States
3rd place, bronze medalist(s)		Ronnie Mills	United States

The men's 100 metre backstroke event at the 1968 Olympic Games took place between 21 and 22 October. This swimming event used backstroke. Because an Olympic-size swimming pool is 50 metres long, this race consisted of two lengths of the pool.

== Results ==
=== Heats ===
Heat 1

Rank	Athlete	Country	Time	Note
1	Larry Barbiere	United States	1:01.9	
2	Franco Chino	Italy	1:02.0	
3	Reinhard Blechert	West Germany	1:02.7	
4	Luis Angel Acosta	Mexico	1:06.5	
5	Friedrich Jokisch	El Salvador	1:13.7	

Heat 2

Rank	Athlete	Country	Time	Note
1	Roland Matthes	East Germany	1:01.0	
2	Santiago Esteva	Spain	1:03.0	
3	Ejvind Pedersen	Denmark	1:03.5	
4	Yevgeny Spiridonov	Soviet Union	1:04.2	
5	Jesús Cabrera	Spain	1:04.8	
6	Eliseo Vidal	Cuba	1:06.4	
7	Ronnie Wong	Hong Kong	1:11.3	

Heat 3

Rank	Athlete	Country	Time	Note
1	Jim Shaw	Canada	1:01.8	
2	Viktor Mazanov	Soviet Union	1:03.1	
3	Roddy Jones	Great Britain	1:04.1	
4	José Joaquín Santibáñez	Mexico	1:04.2	
5	Herman Verbauwen	Belgium	1:04.6	
6	Gary Goodner	Puerto Rico	1:06.3	
7	Yacoub Masboungi	Lebanon	1:11.6	

Heat 4

Rank	Athlete	Country	Time	Note
1	Charlie Hickcox	United States	1:01.1	
2	Franco Del Campo	Italy	1:02.3	
3	Danijel Vrhovšek	Yugoslavia	1:02.9	
4	Joseph Jackson	Great Britain	1:03.0	
5	Gerald Evard	Switzerland	1:05.8	
6	Arturo Carranza	El Salvador	1:17.4	

Heat 5

Rank	Athlete	Country	Time	Note
1	Yuriy Hromak	Soviet Union	1:03.2	
2	Leonardo Baremboin	Argentina	1:04.0	
3	László Cseh Sr.	Hungary	1:04.6	
4	Hans Tegeback	Sweden	1:05.1	
5	Jaime Rivera	Mexico	1:05.1	
6	Francisco Ramis	Puerto Rico	1:07.2	

Heat 6

Rank	Athlete	Country	Time	Note
1	Ronnie Mills	United States	1:01.8	
2	Bob Schoutsen	Netherlands	1:02.8	
3	Karl Byrom	Australia	1:03.2	
4	Kishio Tanaka	Japan	1:04.0	
5	César Filardi	Brazil	1:04.6	
6	Antonio Cruz	Guatemala	1:11.8	

=== Semifinals ===
Heat 1

Rank	Athlete	Country	Time	Note
1	Charlie Hickcox	United States	1:01.6	
2	Jim Shaw	Canada	1:01.9	
3	Reinhard Blechert	West Germany	1:02.2	
4	Yuriy Hromak	Soviet Union	1:02.4	
5	Franco Chino	Italy	1:02.7	
6	Danijel Vrhovšek	Yugoslavia	1:02.7	
7	Joseph Jackson	Great Britain	1:02.8	
8	Ejvind Pedersen	Denmark	1:03.6	

Heat 2

Rank	Athlete	Country	Time	Note
1	Roland Matthes	East Germany	1:01.3	
2	Larry Barbiere	United States	1:01.6	
3	Ronnie Mills	United States	1:01.8	
4	Franco Del Campo	Italy	1:02.1	
5	Bob Schoutsen	Netherlands	1:02.1	
6	Karl Byrom	Australia	1:02.3	
7	Santiago Esteva	Spain	1:02.4	
8	Viktor Mazanov	Soviet Union	1:02.5	

=== Final ===
Rank	Athlete	Country	Time	Notes
1	Roland Matthes	East Germany	58.7	OR
2	Charlie Hickcox	United States	1:00.2	
3	Ronnie Mills	United States	1:00.5	
4	Larry Barbiere	United States	1:01.1	
5	Jim Shaw	Canada	1:01.4	
6	Bob Schoutsen	Netherlands	1:01.8	
7	Reinhard Blechert	West Germany	1:01.9	
8	Franco Del Campo	Italy	1:02.0	

Key: OR = Olympic record
