= Swimming at the 1968 Summer Olympics – Men's 200 metre backstroke =

Men's 200 metre backstroke at the Games of the XIX Olympiad
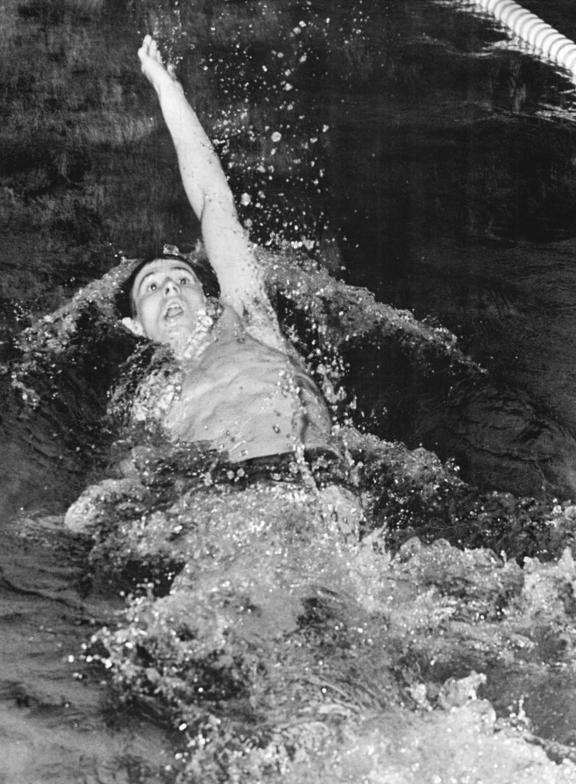
- Gold medalist Roland Matthes (earlier in 1968)
- Venue: Alberca Olímpica Francisco Márquez
- Date: 25 October 1968 (heats and final)
- Competitors: 30 from 21 nations
- Winning time: 2:09.6 OR

Medalists
1st place, gold medalist(s)		Roland Matthes	East Germany
2nd place, silver medalist(s)		Mitch Ivey	United States
3rd place, bronze medalist(s)		Jack Horsley	United States

The men's 200 metre backstroke event at the 1968 Summer Olympics took place on 25 October at the Alberca Olímpica Francisco Márquez. There were 30 competitors from 21 nations, with each nation having up to three swimmers. The event was won by Roland Matthes of East Germany, the second gold medal for a German swimmer after Ernst Hoppenberg won in 1900. Matthes completed the backstroke double (100 and 200 metres) in the first Games both events were held, with Olympic record times in both. The United States, which had swept the podium in 1964, finished in the next three places behind Matthes: Mitch Ivey took silver, Jack Horsley bronze, and Gary Hall Sr. 4th.

== Background ==
This was the third appearance of the 200 metre backstroke event. It was first held in 1900. The event did not return until 1964; since then, it has been on the programme at every Summer Games. From 1904 to 1960, a men's 100 metre backstroke was held instead. In 1964, only the 200 metres was held. Beginning in 1968 and ever since, both the 100 and 200 metre versions have been held.

None of the 8 finalists from the 1964 Games returned. Roland Matthes had set the world record in the East German Olympic trials. The American team was also strong, though all three members of the 1964 podium sweeping team had been replaced.

The Republic of China, Cuba, Guatemala, Mexico, the Philippines, and Switzerland made their debut in the event; East and West Germany competed separately for the first time. Italy and the Netherlands each made their third appearance, the only two nations to have competed at each appearance of the event to that point.

== Competition format ==
The competition used a two-round (heats and final) format. The advancement rule followed the format introduced in 1952. A swimmer's place in the heat was not used to determine advancement; instead, the fastest times from across all heats in a round were used. There were 5 heats of up to 8 swimmers each; with numerous withdrawals, one heat had only 3 swimmers. The top 8 swimmers advanced to the final. Swim-offs were used as necessary to break ties.

This swimming event used backstroke. Because an Olympic-size swimming pool is 50 metres long, this race consisted of four lengths of the pool.

== Records ==
These were the standing world and Olympic records (in seconds) prior to the 1964 Summer Olympics.

World record	Roland Matthes (GDR)	2:07.5	Leipzig, East Germany	14 August 1968
Olympic record	Jed Graef (USA)	2:10.3	Tokyo, Japan	13 October 1964

Roland Matthes broke the Olympic record with a time of 2:09.6 in the final.

== Schedule ==
All times are Central Standard Time (UTC-6)

Date	Time	Round
Friday, 25 October 1968	10:00; 17:00	Heats; Final

== Results ==
=== Heats ===
Rank	Heat	Swimmer	Nation	Time	Notes
1	1	Mitch Ivey	United States	2:11.3	Q
2	3	Roland Matthes	East Germany	2:13.6	Q
3	2	Jack Horsley	United States	2:13.7	Q
4	3	Santiago Esteva	Spain	2:15.8	Q
5	4	Leonid Dobroskokin	Soviet Union	2:16.1	Q
5	3	Joachim Röther	East Germany	2:16.1	Q
7	5	Gary Hall Sr.	United States	2:16.2	Q
8	1	Franco Del Campo	Italy	2:16.3	Q
9	2	Reinhard Blechert	West Germany	2:16.5	
10	3	Ejvind Pedersen	Denmark	2:16.6	
11	5	Mátyás Borlói	Hungary	2:17.9	
12	4	Bob Schoutsen	Netherlands	2:18.2	
13	1	Franco Chino	Italy	2:19.5	
14	2	Jaime Monzó	Spain	2:20.1	
15	3	Karl Byrom	Australia	2:20.7	
15	4	Jaime Rivera	Mexico	2:20.7	
15	1	José Joaquín Santibáñez	Mexico	2:20.7	
18	1	Jim Shaw	Canada	2:21.0	
19	5	Rinus van Beek	Netherlands	2:21.2	
20	3	Eliseo Vidal	Cuba	2:21.3	
21	1	Hans Ljungberg	Sweden	2:22.3	
22	4	Lars Kraus Jensen	Denmark	2:22.5	
23	5	Luis Angel Acosta	Mexico	2:24.0	
24	4	Gerald Evard	Switzerland	2:24.7	
25	3	Leonardo Baremboin	Argentina	2:25.2	
26	1	Tony Asamali	Philippines	2:30.0	
27	3	Francisco Ramis	Puerto Rico	2:30.4	
28	1	Antonio Cruz	Guatemala	2:36.3	
29	5	Ronnie Wong	Hong Kong	2:38.6	
30	4	Chan King-ming	Taiwan	2:46.9	

=== Final ===
Rank	Swimmer	Nation	Time	Notes
1st place, gold medalist(s)	Roland Matthes	East Germany	2:09.6	OR
2nd place, silver medalist(s)	Mitch Ivey	United States	2:10.6	
3rd place, bronze medalist(s)	Jack Horsley	United States	2:10.9	
4	Gary Hall	United States	2:12.6	
5	Santiago Esteva	Spain	2:12.9	
6	Leonid Dobroskokin	Soviet Union	2:15.4	
7	Joachim Röther	East Germany	2:15.8	
8	Franco Del Campo	Italy	2:16.5	
