= Puerto Rico at the 1968 Summer Olympics =

- IOC code: PUR (PRO used at these Games)
- NOC: Puerto Rico Olympic Committee

in Mexico City
- Competitors: 58 in 10 sports
- Flag bearer: Jaime Frontera
- Medals: Gold 0 Silver 0 Bronze 0 Total 0

Summer Olympics appearances (overview)
- 1948; 1952; 1956; 1960; 1964; 1968; 1972; 1976; 1980; 1984; 1988; 1992; 1996; 2000; 2004; 2008; 2012; 2016; 2020; 2024; 2028

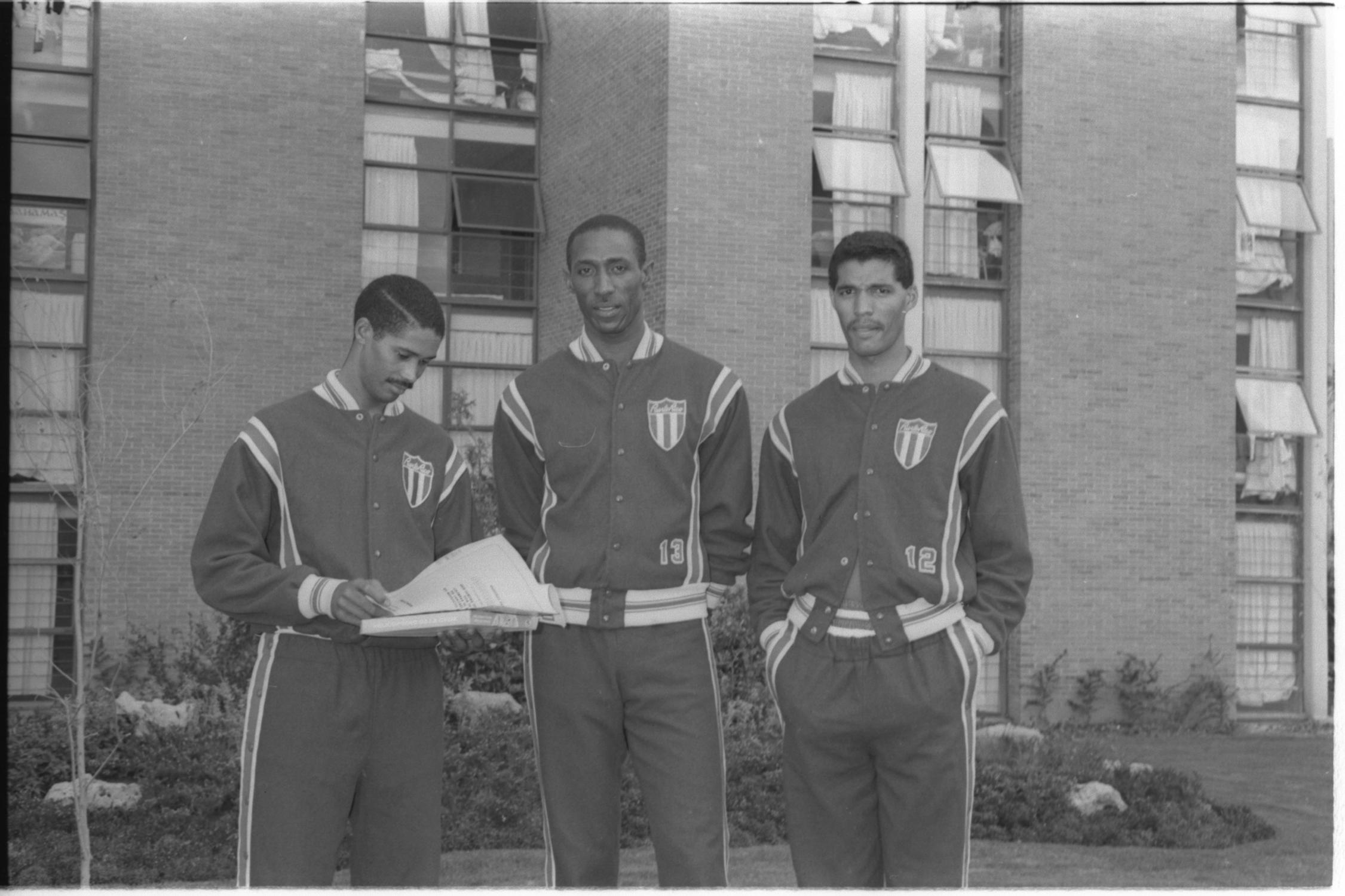
Puerto Rican athletes at the 1968 Olympic Village, Mexico City.

Puerto Rico competed at the 1968 Summer Olympics in Mexico City, Mexico. 58 competitors, 54 men and 4 women, took part in 54 events in 10 sports.

== Athletics ==
Men's 100 metres

- Jorge Vizcarondo

- Round 1 — 10.7 s (→ 7th in heat, did not advance)

Men's 800 metres

- Carlos Baez

- Round 1 — 1:52.6 min (→ 8th in heat, did not advance)

Men's 1500 metres

- Willie Rios

- Round 1 — 4:14.4 min (→ 10th in heat, did not advance)

Men's 110 metres hurdles

- Arnaldo Bristol

- Round 1 — 13.9 s (→ 3rd in heat, advanced to semi final)
- Semi final — 14.1 s (→ 8th in heat, did not advance)

Men's 4×100 metres relay

- Round 1 — DNS

Men's triple jump

- Hector Serrate

- Round 1 — 15.09 m (→ did not advance)

== Basketball ==
Men's team competition

- Preliminary Round (Group A)

- Puerto Rico – Senegal 69-26
- Puerto Rico – Yugoslavia 72-93
- Puerto Rico – Italy 65-68
- Puerto Rico – Spain 62-86
- Puerto Rico – Philippines 89-65
- Puerto Rico – Panama 80-69
- Puerto Rico – USA 56-61
- → 5th in group, advanced to playoff

- 9th-12th placement game

- Puerto Rico – Cuba 71-65

- 9th-10th placement game

- Puerto Rico – Bulgaria 67-57
- → 9th place

- Team roster

- ( 4.) Bill McCadney
- ( 5.) Joe Hatton
- ( 6.) Adolfo Porrata
- ( 7.) Angel Cancel
- ( 8.) Rubén Adorno
- ( 9.) Alberto Zamot
- (10.) Raymond Dalmau
- (11.) Jaime Frontera
- (12.) Francisco Córdova
- (13.) Teófilo Cruz
- (14.) Tomás Gutiérrez
- (15.) Mariano Ortiz

== Boxing ==
Flyweight (51 kg)

- Heriberto Cintrón

- Round 1 — Lost to Artur Olech of Poland

Bantamweight (54 kg)

- Andrés Torres

- Round 2 — Lost to Giuseppe Mura of Italy

Featherweight (57 kg)

- Reinaldo Mercado

- Round 1 — Lost to Jovan Pajkovic of Yugoslavia

Lightweight (60 kg)

- Eugenio Febus

- Round 1 — Lost to Abdel Sheed of Sudan

Light welterweight (63.5 kg)

- Adalberto Siebens

- Round 1 — Lost to Habib Galhia of Tunisia

Middleweight (75 kg)

- Saulo Hernández

- Round 1 — Lost to Raúl Marrero of Cuba

Light heavyweight (81 kg)

- Jorge Clemente

- Round of 16 — Lost to Stanislaw Dragan of Poland

== Cycling ==
1000 metres time trial

- Edwin Torres — 1:07.65 min (→ 20th place)

Sprint

- Edwin Torres

- Round 1 — 3rd in heat (→ advanced to repechage)
- Repechage — 2nd in heat (→ did not advance)

Individual pursuit

- Edwin Torres

- Heats — failed to depart (→ no ranking)

== Diving ==
Men

Athlete	Event	Preliminary		Final			
Athlete	Event	Points	Rank	Points	Rank	Total	Rank
Jerry Anderson	3 m springboard	68.83	27	Did not advance			
Héctor Bas	3 m springboard	62.43	28	Did not advance			
Jerry Anderson	10 m platform	65.14	34	Did not advance			
Héctor Bas	10 m platform	47.97	35	Did not advance			

== Fencing ==
One fencer represented Puerto Rico in 1968.

Men's foil

- José Miguel Pérez — defeated in first round

- First round — 6th place in group C with 0 wins and 5 losses (→ did not advance)
1. lost to Witold Woyda (POL)
2. lost to German Sveshnikov (URS)
3. lost to Gerry Wiedel (CAN)
4. lost to Moustapha Sohem (EGY)
5. lost to Alberto Varela (URU)

Men's épée

- José Miguel Pérez — defeated in first round

- First round — 7th place in group D with 0 wins and 6 losses (→ did not advance)
1. lost to Csaba Fenyvesi (HUN)
2. lost to Gianfranco Paolucci (ITA)
3. lost to Valeriano Pérez (MEX)
4. lost to Ștefan Haukler (ROU)
5. lost to Russell Hobby (AUS)
6. lost to Francisco da Silva (POR)

== Sailing ==
Flying Dutchman class

- Juan Torruella, Radamés Torruella (→ 28th place)

Star class

- Gary Hoyt (→ 10th place)

5.5 metre class

- Lee Gentil, (James Fairbank, Hovey Freeman) (→ 14th place)

== Shooting ==
Nine shooters, all male, represented Puerto Rico in 1968.

25 m pistol

- Fernando Miranda — 558 pts (→ 50th place)

50 m pistol

- José González — 511 pts (→ 63rd place)
- Miguel Barasorda — 481 pts (→ 69th place)

50 m rifle, prone

- Ralph Rodríguez — 588 pts (→ 47th place)
- Alberto Santiago — 582 pts (→ 70th place)

Trap

- George Silvernail — 188 pts (→ 31st place)
- Ángel Marchand — 156 pts (→ 53rd place)

Skeet

- Rafael Batista — 187 pts (→ 27th place)
- Alberto Guerrero — 174 pts (→ 45th place)

== Swimming ==
Men's 100 metres freestyle

- Gary Goodner

- Heats — 55.7 s (→ 3rd in heat, advanced to semi final)
- Semi final — 55.8 s (→ 7th in heat, did not advance)

- Michael Goodner

- Heats — 58.2 s (→ 7th in heat, did not advance)

- José Ferriouli

- Heats — 56.1 s (→ 5th in heat, did not advance)

Women's 100 metres freestyle

- Ana Marcial

- Heats — 1:10.1 min (→ 8th in heat, did not advance)

- Lorna Blake

- Heats — 1:13.2 min (→ 8th in heat, did not advance)

- Kristina Moir

- Heats — 1:07.9 min (→ 8th in heat, did not advance)

Men's 200 metres freestyle

- Gary Goodner

- Heats — 2:06.6 min (→ 5th in heat, did not advance)

- Jorge González

- Heats — 2:09.1 min (→ 4th in heat, did not advance)

- José Ferriouli

- Heats — DNS (→ no ranking)

Women's 200 metres freestyle

- Lorna Blake

- Heats — 2:43.8 min (→ 8th in heat, did not advance)

- Kristina Moir

- Heats — 2:23.1 min (→ 5th in heat, did not advance)

- Ana Marcial

- Heats — DNS (→ no ranking)

Men's 400 metres freestyle

- Michael Goodner

- Heats — 5:00.2 min (→ 6th in heat, did not advance)

- Jorge González

- Heats — 4:38.1 min (→ 5th in heat, did not advance)

Women's 400 metres freestyle

- Lorna Blake

- Heats — 5:54.7 min (→ 6th in heat, did not advance)

- Kristina Moir

- Heats — 4:57.7 min (→ 3rd in heat, did not advance)

- Ana Marcial

- Heats — DNS (→ no ranking)

Women's 800 metres freestyle

- Kristina Moir

- Heats — 10:24.5 min (→ 4th in heat, did not advance)

- Lorna Blake

- Heats — DNS (→ no ranking)

- Ana Marcial

- Heats — DNS (→ no ranking)

Men's 1500 metres freestyle

- Jorge González

- Heats — 19:06.0 min (→ 5th in heat, did not advance)

Women's 100 metres breaststroke

- Liana Vicens

- Heats — 1:25.2 min (→ 7th in heat, did not advance)

Women's 200 metres breaststroke

- Liana Vicens

- Heats — 3:16.2 min (→ 7th in heat, did not advance)

Men's 100 metres backstroke

- Gary Goodner

- Heats — 1:06.3 min (→ 6th in heat, did not advance)

- Francisco Ramis

- Heats — 1:07.2 min (→ 6th in heat, did not advance)

Men's 200 metres backstroke

- Francisco Ramis

- Heats — 2:30.4 min (→ 8th in heat, did not advance)

Men's 100 metres butterfly

- José Ferriouli

- Heats — 1:00.6 min (→ 3rd in heat, advanced to semi final)
- Semi final — 1:00.9 min (→ 7th in heat, did not advance)

- Gary Goodner

- Heats — 1:00.3 min (→ 2nd in heat, advanced to semi final)
- Semi final — 1:00.1 min (→ 6th in heat, did not advance)

Women's 100 metres butterfly

- Ana Marcial

- Heats — 1:17.1 min (→ 6th in heat, did not advance)

- Kristina Moir

- Heats — DNS (→ no ranking)

Men's 200 metres butterfly

- José Ferriouli

- Heats — 2:23.4 min (→ 7th in heat, did not advance)

Women's 200 metres butterfly

- Kristina Moir

- Heats — 2:51.1 min (→ 6th in heat, did not advance)

- Ana Marcial

- Heats — DNS (→ no ranking)

Men's 200 metres individual medley

- José Ferriouli

- Heats — DNS (→ no ranking)

Women's 200 metres individual medley

- Liana Vicens

- Heats — 2:57.0 min (→ 6th in heat, did not advance)

- Kristina Moir

- Heats — 2:42.8 min (→ 5th in heat, did not advance)

- Ana Marcial

- Heats — DNS (→ no ranking)

Men's 400 metres individual medley

- Francisco Ramis

- Heats — 5:30.9 min (→ 7th in heat, did not advance)

Women's 400 metres individual medley

- Kristina Moir

- Heats — DNS (→ no ranking)

Men's 4×100 metres freestyle relay

- Jorge González, Michael Goodner, Gary Goodner, José Ferriouli

- Heats — 3:47.0 min (→ 7th in heat, did not advance)

Men's 4×200 metres freestyle relay

- José Ferriouli, Gary Goodner, Michael Goodner, Jorge González

- Heats — 8:40.2 min (→ 6th in heat, did not advance)

Men's 4×100 metres medley relay

- Francisco Ramis, Gary Goodner, José Ferriouli, Jorge González

- Heats — 4:27.6 min (→ 7th in heat, did not advance)

Women's 4×100 metres medley relay

- Ana Marcial, Kristina Moir, Liana Vicens, Lorna Blake

- Heats — 5:18.2 min (→ 7th in heat, did not advance)

== Tennis ==
Men's singles

- Antonio Ortíz

- Round 1 — Lost to Miguel Olvera of Ecuador

- Alberto Carrero

- Round 1 — Lost to Pierre Darmon of France

- Stanley Pasarell

- Round 1 — Lost to Rafael Osuna of Mexico

Men's doubles

- Stanley Pasarell, Alberto Carrero

- Round 1 — Beat Humberto Camarotti and Juan Brito of Cuba
- Quarter-final — Lost to Joaquín Loyo and Pierre Darmon of Mexico and France

== Weightlifting ==
Featherweight

- Enrique Hernández

- Press — 115.0 kg
- Snatch — 100.0 kg
- Jerk — 130.0 kg
- Total — 345.0 kg (→ 13th place)

- Pedro Serrano

- Press — 97.5 kg
- Snatch — 97.5 kg
- Jerk — 127.5 kg
- Total — 322.5 kg (→ 17th place)

Bantamweight

- Fernando Báez

- Press — 120.0 kg
- Snatch — 92.5 kg
- Jerk — 132.5 kg
- Total — 345.0 kg (→ 6th place)

Light heavyweight

- Angel Pagán

- Press — 145.0 kg
- Snatch — 130.0 kg
- Jerk — 160.0 kg
- Total — 435.0 kg (→ 9th place)

- José Manuel Figueroa

- Press — 137.5 kg
- Snatch — 120.0 kg
- Jerk — 152.5 kg
- Total — 410.0 kg (→ 20th place)

Middle heavyweight

- Fernando Torres

- Press — 135.0 kg
- Snatch — 115.0 kg
- Jerk — 155.0 kg
- Total — 405.0 kg (→ 22nd place)
