= Goodner =

Goodner is a surname. Notable people with the surname include:

- Carol Goodner (1904–2001), American actress
- Gary Goodner (born 1949), Puerto Rican swimmer
- John Goodner (1944–2005), American football coach
- Lillian Goodner (1896 –1994), African-American blues singer
- Michael Goodner (born 1953), Puerto Rican swimmer
