= Mara Sacchi =

Italian swimmer (born 1948)

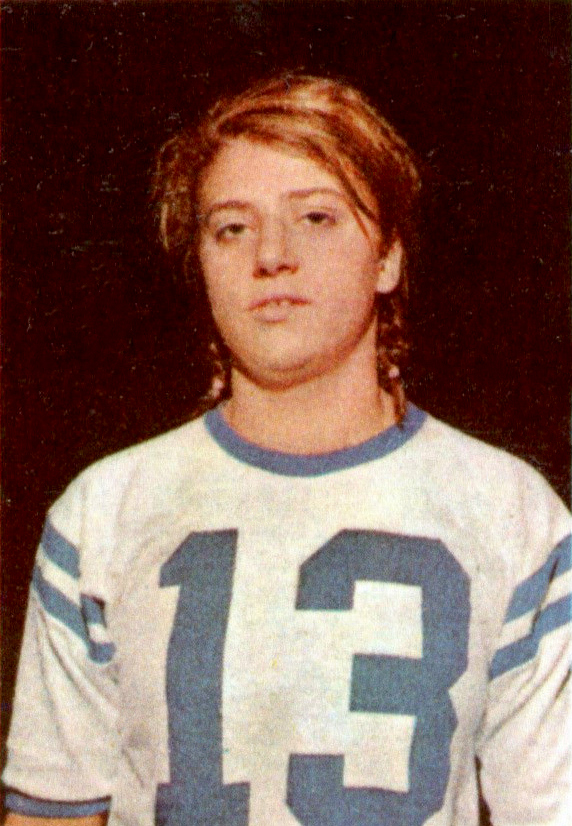
- Sacchi in 1967

Personal information
- Born: 3 November 1948 (age 77) Milan, Italy
- Height: 1.70 m (5 ft 7 in)
- Weight: 63 kg (139 lb)

Sport
- Sport: Swimming
- Club: N.C. Milano
Medal record
Women's swimming
Representing Italy
Mediterranean Games
Silver medal – second place	1967 Tunis	100 m freestyle

Mara Sacchi (born 3 November 1948) is a retired Italian freestyle swimmer. She competed at the 1964 Olympics in the 100 m and 4 × 100 m freestyle relay and reached the final in the relay.

Sacchi's brother Massimo and nephew Luca are also Olympic swimmers.
