= Swimming at the 1967 Pan American Games – Men's 200 metre butterfly =

Men's 200 metre butterfly at the 1967 Pan American Games
- Venue: Pan Am Pool
- Dates: July 26 (preliminaries and finals)
- Competitors: from - nations

Medalists
Gold medal	Mark Spitz	United States
Silver medal	Tom Arusoo	Canada
Bronze medal	Mike Burton	United States

The men's 200 metre butterfly competition of the swimming events at the 1967 Pan American Games took place on 26 July at the Pan Am Pool. The last Pan American Games champion was Carl Robie of US.

This race consisted of four lengths of the pool, all lengths being in butterfly stroke.

== Results ==
All times are in minutes and seconds.

KEY:	q	Fastest non-qualifiers	Q	Qualified	GR	Games record	NR	National record	PB	Personal best	SB	Seasonal best

=== Final ===
The final was held on July 26.

Rank	Name	Nationality	Time	Notes
1st place, gold medalist(s)	Mark Spitz	United States	2:06.4	WR
2nd place, silver medalist(s)	Tom Arusoo	Canada	2:10.7	
3rd place, bronze medalist(s)	Mike Burton	United States	2:13.2	
4	-	-	-	
5	João Costa Lima Neto	Brazil	-	
6	-	-	-	
7	-	-	-	
8	-	-	-	
