= Don Easterling =

American swimming coach

- Easterling in his office, 1970s

Biographical details
- Born: 1932
- Died: January 14, 2023 (aged 90–91); Virginia

Coaching career (HC unless noted)
- 1952-1970: Fort Worth Panthers Boy's Club; Burford Aquatic Club
- 1966-1970: University of Texas, Arlington
- 1971-1995: North Carolina State University

Head coaching record
- Overall: 329-128 .720 Winning Percentage

Accomplishments and honors

Championships
- 1969 NCAA Runner-up (UT Arlington); 17 ACC Titles (North Carolina State)

Awards
- 4 x ACC Coach of the Year; 1993 National Colleg. Swim Coach of the Year; Texas Swimming Hall of Fame; NC State Hall of Fame; ASCA Hall of Fame; CSCAA 100 greatest coaches of the century

Don Easterling was an American collegiate swim coach for North Carolina State University from 1971 through 1995 where he led the team to 17 Atlantic Coast Conference Titles, including twelve straight from 1971 through 1982. He was honored as the Atlantic Conference Coach of the year four times, and was named the National Collegiate Scholastic Swimming Coach of the Year in 1993.

A Texas native, Easterling was born in 1932. Beginning his coaching career by the age of twenty, he coached the Fort Worth Panthers Boy's Club and the Burford Aquatic Club from 1952 through 1970. In the summer of 1954, he married Marcia Boone in Fort Worth, Texas.

While coaching at the University of Texas Arlington from 1966 to 1970, he led the team to national prominence, capturing a second-place finish among teams at the NCAA nationals in 1969.

== North Carolina State ==
At North Carolina State, he inherited a strong team from coach Willis Casey, who had mentored national, ACC, and Olympic champions during his 25-year tenure. During Easterling's 24 seasons with the team, from 1971 to 1995, he continued Casey's winning tradition and built upon it, establishing his own successful record.

His North Carolina teams captured 12 continuous ACC championships from 1971 through 1982. Demonstrating remarkable dominance, North Carolina had a perfect ACC conference championship win in 1972, where his team won each of 17 events, an accomplishment that has never been managed by another team. He was the first coach of the NC State Women's Swimming program in 1976, leading the team to ACC titles in 1979 and 1980. He earned an overall record of 329 wins and 128 losses in dual meets, accumulating a winning percentage of .720. Easterling mentored a total of 40 All Americans during his time with North Carolina.

Easterling retired from coaching the University of North Carolina in 1994 in mid-season, complaining of being “tired and worn out”, though he would later do some non-collegiate coaching. He had recently had his 5th knee operation and suffered from back problems.

In 2012 Easterling started a swim program in Charlottesville, Virginia at the ACAC fitness club, which five years later was renamed the E Team to honor Easterling and was registered with United States Masters Swimming. In 2017, under its new name, the team moved to the Piedmont Family YMCA and underwent considerable growth. The program included prior high school and college swimmers, but eventually also catered to a few elite national competitors, triathletes and open water swimmers. The Piedmont YMCA Masters scored 14 first-place finishes at the 2017 Virginia Commonwealth Games Short Course Swimming Meet at Liberty University. He continued as a YMCA and Masters Swim Coach through 2022. Easterling did not retire from coaching the team until the Fall of 2022, when the team was merged with Cavalier Aquatics program.

== Outstanding swimmers ==
He coached a total of five Olympians, who captured seven medals, including three gold.

In 1968, while coaching U.T. Arlington, he had four swimmers make the finals of the U.S. Olympic Trials, where two of them, Doug Russell and Ronnie Mills, made the U.S. team. Easterling had four of his swimmers qualify for the U.S. Olympic Trials, where they made it to the finals in 1968. Ronnie Mills, and Douglas Russell performed well in the finals, and made the U.S. Olympic team. Russell won two gold medals at the 1968 Mexico City Olympics, with one in the 100-meter butterfly, and one in the 4x100-meter medley. Mills would become a 1968 100-meter backstroke Olympic bronze medalist.

An exceptional swimmer coached by Easterling during his time at North Carolina State was 1996 Atlanta 4x100-meter freestyle Olympic gold medalist David Fox, who was also an NCAA champion. Fox, who enjoyed the personal attention given to him and other swimmers, noted that Easterling, “constantly wrote and spoke to his athletes. He wrote small notes to each swimmer on their weekly practice logs". Two other Olympians coached at North Carolina State included Olympic 1976 200-meter butterfly silver medalist and NCAA 200-yard butterfly champion Steve Gregg. One of his most outstanding North Carolina State swimmers was 1976 200-meter backstroke Olympic bronze medalist Dan Harrigan who won a bronze medal in the 200-meter backstroke at the 1976 Montreal Olympics. Easterling also coached Canadian Olympian Duncan Goodhew, who captured a gold in the 100m breaststroke, and a bronze in the 4 × 100 m medley relay at the 1980 Moscow Olympics. Goodhew later participated on Canada's bobsled team.

Easterling died on the morning of Saturday, April 23, 2023, at his home in the Charlottesville, Virginia area at the age of 90. He had been suffering from pneumonia and COVID-19 for several weeks.

=== Honors ===
Easterling was a four-time Atlantic Coast Conference Coach of the Year, a 1993 National College Coach of Year, and was inducted into both the Texas Swimming and Diving Hall of Fame and the North Carolina State University Sports Hall of Fame. He was an American Swimming Coaches Association Hall of Fame inductee and was selected as one of the College Swimming Coaches Association's (CSCAA) 100 greatest coaches of the Century.
