= Attanasio =

Attanasio is a surname. Notable people with the surname include:

- A. A. Attanasio (born 1951), American science fiction writer
- Antonio Attanasio (1950–1982), Italian swimmer
- Dino Attanasio (1925–2026), Italian-born Belgian comics writer and illustrator
- Gianluca Attanasio (born 1979), Italian composer, singer-songwriter and music producer
- Luca Attanasio (1977–2021), Italian diplomat
- Mark Attanasio (born 1957), American investment banker and owner of the Milwaukee Brewers
- Orazio Attanasio (born 1959), Italian economist
- Paul Attanasio (born 1959), American screenwriter and television producer
