= Ross Wales =

American swimmer (born 1947)

Personal information
- Full name: Ross Elliott Wales
- National team: United States
- Born: October 17, 1947 (age 78) Youngstown, Ohio, U.S.
- Height: 5 ft 10 in (178 cm)
- Weight: 165 lb (75 kg)

Sport
- Sport: Swimming
- Strokes: Butterfly
- Club: Y Neptune Swim Club; Princeton Aquatic Association
- College team: Princeton University
- Coach: Sherman Law (Neptune Club); Bob Clotworthy (Princeton)
Medal record
Men's swimming
Representing the United States
Olympic Games
Bronze medal – third place	1968 Mexico City	100 m butterfly
Pan American Games
Silver medal – second place	1967 Winnipeg	100 m butterfly

Ross Elliott Wales (born October 17, 1947) is an American former competition swimmer for Princeton University and a 1968 Olympic Games bronze medalist in the 100-meter butterfly. Ross later served as President of United States Swimming from 1979-1984, as President of U.S. Aquatic Sports, Inc. through 1988, and as an executive with FINA, the Federation Internationale de Natation Amateur. He served as President of the National Swimming Foundation from 1984-1987.

== Early swimming ==
Wales was born October 17, 1947, in Youngstown, Ohio, where he grew up swimming for Youngstown's YMCA Neptunes Swim Club under Coach Sherman Law, beginning around the age of 9. Wales attended Youngstown's Rayen High School, which closed to students in 2007, but swam almost exclusively representing the Youngstown Y Neptune Swim Club.

On July 10, 1960, swimming for the Neptune Swim Club at age 12, Wales broke an age group record in the 50-meter butterfly for boys 11-12 with the new record time of 31.5 seconds at the Cuyahoga Falls Senior Open and age group swimming meet. Representing the YMCA Neptune again in November, 1964, he swam a :54.9, winning the 100-yard butterfly at the YMCA-Neptune age group meet in Youngstown, Ohio. At the Lake Erie District meet around late August 1963, at the age of 15, Wales swam a 1:02.9 for the 100-meter butterfly, still representing the Youngstown YMCA Neptunes. On August 4, 1966, at the New Jersey State AAU Swim Meet in Sea Bright, New Jersey, Ross swam a :60.2 to win the 100-meter butterfly.

=== 100-yard national fly record ===
Known for outstanding technique in a stroke that was difficult to perform, Wales's early coach with the Neptune Swim Club, Sherman Law, noted that Ross was "so well coordinated that his finesse in the butterfly, rather than strength and endurance, was the secret of his success.” As a High School Senior in 1965, while representing Rayen High School, Ross broke the national record for the 100-yard butterfly by swimming a 52.2, breaking the record of 52.4 set by Olympian gold medalist Don Schollander in 1964. Ross was made a High School All American for his record time of 52.2 seconds in the 100-yard butterfly.

== Princeton University ==
Wales swam for Princeton University under Hall of Fame swimming and diving coach Bob Clotworthy, graduating in June, 1969. At Princeton, Wales captured two National AAU 100-yard butterfly championships, one in 1966, and one in 1969 and also won the 1967 NCAA National Championship in the 100y butterfly with a time of 50.26, improving on National YMCA record.

== 1968 Olympic bronze ==
He represented the United States at the 1968 Summer Olympics in Mexico City, where he received a bronze medal in the men's 100-meter butterfly, finishing behind compatriots Doug Russell and Mark Spitz. Wales swam a 57.2 for the 100-meter butterfly at the Olympics, only .8 seconds behind silver medalist Mark Spitz. On the final lap, though Mark Spitz was the standing world record holder in the event, American Doug Russell pulled ahead of him, and won the gold medal with Spitz taking the Silver medal. The American team took first, second and third in the event.

In International competition, Ross won a silver medal in the 100-meter butterfly at the 1967 Pan American Games in Winnipeg, Canada.

Through early 1972, as Wales continued in international competition, he was coached by Hall of Fame Coach Don Gambril, with the Phillips 66 Swim Club in Long Beach, California. On April 9, 1971, Wales competed in the 200-yard butterfly at the National AAU short course swimming Championships in Pullman, Washington where he swam against Gary Hall of Indiana.

== Later life ==
Wales competed into the early 1970's, before entering the University of Virginia law school. He served in Vietnam, but later returned to complete his Juris Doctor degree at the University of Virginia's Charlottesville campus. While in the military, he swam for an Army team managed by Hall of Fame Coach Skip Kenney. After completing law school, he practiced law in Cincinnati, spending much of his law career with the firm of Taft, Stettinius, and Hollister and later served as president of the U.S. Swimming Federation from 1979-1984.

=== Swimming community executive ===
In the 1970's, Wales served as a representative for athletes to the National AAU Swimming Committee and served on the Swimming Rules Committee. While serving as President of the United States Swimming Federation, later known as United States Swimming from around 1979-1984, Ross also served as President of U.S. Aquatic Sports, Inc. (USAS) through 1988. Ross was also a member of the U.S. Olympic Committee Executive Board from 1985-1989 and was the President of the National Swimming Foundation from 1984-1987.

Significantly, Wales also served four years as the secretary to the FINA's Technical Swimming Committee from 1984-1988. In 1988, he was elected Honorary Secretary to FINA, the Federation Internationale de Natation Amateur and served as FINA's Vice-President in 1992. With his legal background, Ross was able to explain complex rules and other issues with clarity and detail, and he took part in writing a range of rules proposals including rules that controlled doping, particularly when doping rules which had to face major rewrites, were in 1995, 1996, and 1999. In 1992, he helped FINA form an Open Water Swimming Committee.

Wales's son's Dod and Craig Wales were noted swimmers for Cincinnati's St. Xavier High School. Dod Wales captained the Stanford Swimming Team, and captured the NCAA National 100-yard butterfly championship with a time of 45.89, making him and father Ross Wales the only father-son pair to ever win the NCAA National Championships in the same event. Son Craig Wales was elected captain of the Princeton University Swimming Team in 2000.

=== Honors ===
Graduating Princeton in 1969, Wales was awarded the William Winston Roper Trophy. For his service as an administrator and executive in the American Swimming Community, he received the Capt. Ransom J. Author M.D. award, presented by United States Masters Swimming in 1987. As a cornerstone to his contributions to the swimming community and as a competitor, Wales was inducted into the International Swimming Hall of Fame in 2004.

== See also ==
- List of members of the International Swimming Hall of Fame
- List of Olympic medalists in swimming (men)
- List of Princeton University Olympians
- List of Princeton University people
