= Antonio Corell =

Spanish swimmer (born 1950)

Personal information
- Full name: Antonio Corell Fornet
- Born: 27 May 1950 (age 76) Barcelona, Spain

Sport
- Sport: Swimming
Medal record
Men's swimming
Representing Spain
Mediterranean Games
Gold medal – first place	1971 İzmir	400 m backstroke
Silver medal – second place	1967 Tunis	100 m backstroke
Silver medal – second place	1967 Tunis	4x100 m medley

Antonio Corell Fornet (Note: In this Spanish name, the first or paternal surname is Corell and the second or maternal family name is Fornet.) (Catalan: Antoni Corell i Jornet; born 27 May 1950) is a Spanish former backstroke and freestyle swimmer who competed in the 1968 Summer Olympics and in the 1972 Summer Olympics.
