= Ezio Della Savia =

Italian swimmer (1942–2021)

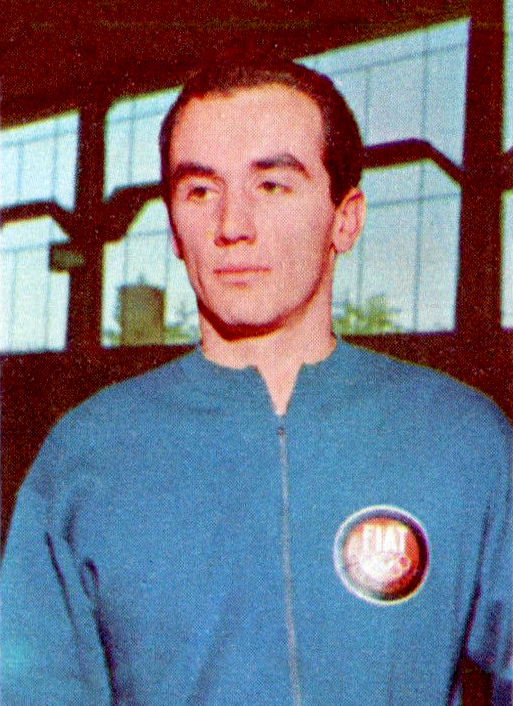
- Della Savia in 1967

Personal information
- Born: 24 June 1942 Cormons, Italy
- Died: 5 September 2021 (aged 79)
- Height: 1.85 m (6 ft 1 in)
- Weight: 92 kg (203 lb)

Sport
- Sport: Swimming
- Club: C.S. Fiat, Torino
Medal record
Men's swimming
Representing Italy
Mediterranean Games
| Silver medal – second place | 1967 Tunis | 4x100 m freestyle |

Ezio Della Savia (24 June 1942 – 5 September 2021) was an Italian swimmer. He competed at the 1960 Summer Olympics in the 100 m freestyle and at the 1964 Summer Olympics in the 200 m backstroke, but failed to reach the finals. He died in September 2021, at the age of 79.
