= Arthur Cusack =

Australian swimming coach (1919–2000)

- Born: 9 September 1919; Maryborough, Queensland
- Died: 2000 (aged 80–81); Brisbane, Queensland
- Occupation: Australian Olympic swimming coach

Arthur Cusack (born 1919, Maryborough, Queensland; died 2000, Brisbane) was an Australian Olympic swimming coach in the 1950s and 1960s.

== Early career ==
In 1938, at 18 years old, Cusack became the Secretary of the newly formed Maryborough Amateur Swimming Club. He, along with Des Ramsay, became a Coach at the club at the end of the Second World War. David Theile was initially coached by Ramsay, but soon switched to Cusack, even though Cusack was thought to be a difficult coach by many swimmers, as he would require long, tiring sessions in the pool. In 1958, Cusack left Maryborough.

In 1962, Cusack was appointed as a coach on the Australian 1962 Commonwealth Games team in Perth. In the mid-60s, Cusack took over the lease of the Centenary Pool in Brisbane. It was from here that he would take on the coaching of his nephew Robert Cusack into the Australian Olympic Team. In 1970, Cusack was again named as a coach on the Australian Commonwealth Games team for the Edinburgh Games, this time as coach of the Women's team.

== Coaching highlights ==
Arthur Cusack was the coach of Olympic Gold medal winner David Theile, who won gold in the 100m backstroke in the 1956 Melbourne Olympics and the 1960 Rome Olympics. He won the silver in the 4 × 100 m Medley Relay team at the same games in Rome.

Arthur Cusack coached his nephew Robert Cusack, who won a bronze medal along with Michael Wenden, Bob Windle and Greg Rogers in the 4 × 100 m freestyle relay at the 1968 Mexico City Olympics. He coached Ann Margaret Nelson, a finalist in the 110-yard backstroke in the Cardiff 1958 British Empire and Commonwealth Games, where she finished fifth with a time of 1.15.5, behind Judy Grinham of England.

Arthur Cusack is the great-uncle of Simon Cusack, Robert Cusack's son. Simon Cusack is the head Coach of Commercial Swimming Club, where he coaches Australian swimmers Cate Campbell, Bronte Campbell and Christian Sprenger.

== New turning technique ==
Arthur Cusack introduced a backstroke turn and a bent-arm stroke to assist David Theile in his quest for Olympic gold. This new turning technique was seen as suspect by some officials during the heats of the 100m backstroke at the 1956 Olympics, who wanted Theile to give a demonstration for their review, a request Cusack refused. The turn was not subsequently used by Thiele during the final, but during the 1957 Queensland Championships, Theile was disqualified for the only time in his career when officials ruled that the turning style was illegal. This turning style was soon adopted by other swimmers, and is still used today.

== Awards and recognition ==
Cusack was a member of the Australian Olympic Committee for many years. He is a Merit Award Recipient and is on the Honour Roll of the Australian Olympic Committee, – Queensland Olympic Council for his services to Olympic Swimming and the Olympic Movement in Australia.

On 24 December 2007, at the Queensland Swimming championships in Brisbane, Queensland, Arthur Cusack was posthumously inducted into the Queensland Swimming Association Hall of Fame.
