= Gian Corrado Gross =

Italian swimmer (1942–2016)

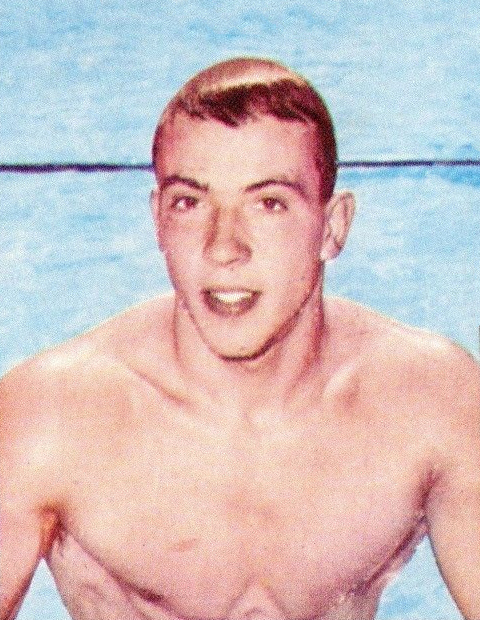

Personal information
- Nickname: Gianni
- Nationality: Italian
- Born: 11 February 1942 Berlin, Germany
- Died: 30 June 2016 (aged 74) Padua, Italy
- Height: 1.74 m (5 ft 9 in)
- Weight: 79 kg (174 lb)

Sport
- Sport: Swimming
- Strokes: Breaststroke
- Club: Rari Nantes Florentia, Firenze
Medal record
Men's swimming
Representing Italy
Mediterranean Games
Gold medal – first place	1967 Tunis	100 m breaststroke
Gold medal – first place	1967 Tunis	4x100 m medley

Gian Corrado "Gianni" Gross (11 February 1942 – 30 June 2016) was a breaststroke swimmer from Italy.

== Biography ==
He competed at the 1964 Summer Olympics in the 200 m breaststroke and 4 × 100 m medley relay and reached the final in the relay. He won a gold medal in the 100 m at the 1967 Mediterranean Games.
