= Don McKenzie (swimmer) =

American swimmer (1947–2008)

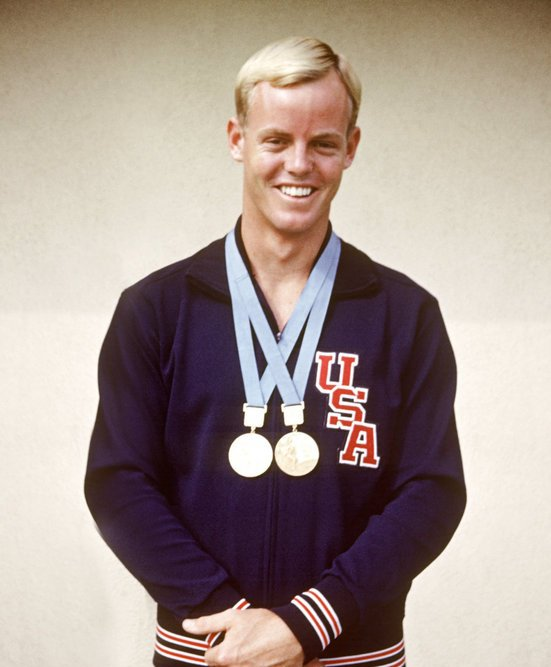
- McKenzie wearing 1968 Olympic gold medals

Personal information
- Full name: Donald Ward McKenzie Jr.
- Nickname: "Don"
- National team: United States
- Born: May 11, 1947 Hollywood, California, U.S.
- Died: December 3, 2008 (aged 61) Reno, Nevada, U.S.
- Occupations: Software design, Real Estate
- Height: 6 ft 1 in (1.85 m)
- Weight: 176 lb (80 kg)
- Spouse: Syd McKenzie

Sport
- Sport: Swimming
- Strokes: Breaststroke
- Club: Bloomington Swim Club
- College team: Indiana University
- Coach: James "Doc" Counsilman (Indiana U)
Medal record
Men's swimming
Representing the United States
Olympic Games
Gold medal – first place	1968 Mexico City	100 m breaststroke
Gold medal – first place	1968 Mexico City	4x100 m medley relay

Donald Ward McKenzie Jr. (May 11, 1947 – December 3, 2008) was an American competition swimmer, who competed for Indiana University. He was a 1968 two-time Olympic champion, and former world record-holder. Highly recognized on the world stage as a breaststroker, at one time he simultaneously held a world record, two Olympic records and five American records.

Donald Ward McKenzie Jr. was born on May 11, 1947 to Donald Ward McKenzie Sr., and Clarice Kendrick McKenzie in Hollywood, California. Don's father Donald Ward Sr. was a Beverly Hill Investment Counselor and a graduate of the University of Southern California. McKenzie Jr. attended and swam for the Grant High School Lancers, where in April, 1965, he helped lead his team to the East Valley League Championship, by winning the 100 breaststroke with a time of 1:07.3 and also competing on two winning relay teams. In May, 1965, at the East Valley Swimming Championship, he set a new East Valley League record of 1:04 in the finals of the 100-yard breaststroke, which broke the former league record he had set in the preliminary heats.

== Indiana University ==
McKenzie attended LA Valley Junior College, and then Indiana University in Bloomington, where he swam for Hall of Fame coach Doc Counsilman's Indiana Hoosiers swimming and diving team in National Collegiate Athletic Association (NCAA) competition during the late 1960s. He won an individual NCAA national championship in the 100-yard breaststroke while swimming for the Hoosiers. In the years 1968 and 1969, McKenzie won letters in swimming and swam on first place Big 10 Conference medley relay teams. In 1969, he swam on a championship medley relay team, that won an NCAA championship, and held 100 and 200 breaststroke Big Ten records.

McKenzie completed the U.S. Naval Officer Candidate School.

== 1968 Mexico City Olympics ==
He competed at the 1968 Olympic Games in Mexico City, where in an unexpected victory against better known Russian breaststrokers Nikolay Panking, and Vladamir Kosinsky, he received a gold medal for winning the men's 100-meter breaststroke with a time of 1:07.7. In a come from behind finish, he edged out Vladamir Kosinsky by only .3 seconds.

He won a second gold medal as a member of the winning U.S. team in the men's 4×100-meter medley relay. The first-place team of Charlie Hickcox, McKenzie, Doug Russell and Ken Walsh set a new world-record time of 3:54.9 in the event final.

=== Honors ===
McKenzie was inducted as an "Honor Swimmer" into the International Swimming Hall of Fame in 1989. In 2000, he was inducted into the Indiana University Hall of Fame. He was also inducted posthumously into the Los Angeles Valley College Athletic Hall of Fame in 2011.

McKenzie continued to swim after the Olympics. He became a Masters swimmer with the Sierra Nevada Masters and held the men's 50–54 age group 100-yard national breaststroke record with a 1:01.02 in 1998. His record stood until 2010.

== Post-swimming careers ==
As the president of Practice Management Services, he created and supported computer software and systems for medical, dental, and small businesses. He was a graduate of the Northern Nevada Real Estate School and was a real estate investor, counselor, and licensee with Remcor in Reno. He enjoyed the Sierra Nevada Masters and the Pacific Masters Swimming groups as well as golfing, skiing, target shooting, wood working, and racing cars.

Don was diagnosed with a Stage IV brain tumor (a glioblastoma) in the summer of 2007. He died at his home on December 3, 2008, due to complications resulting from his brain tumor and was survived by his father and mother, Don and Clarice McKenzie. He was also survived by his wife, Syd McKenzie and children, Amy, Ryan and (Andrea), Anne, Emily, and Amanda McKenzie.

== See also ==
- List of members of the International Swimming Hall of Fame
- List of Indiana University (Bloomington) people
- List of Olympic medalists in swimming (men)
- World record progression 4 × 100 metres medley relay
