= Swimming at the 1967 Mediterranean Games =

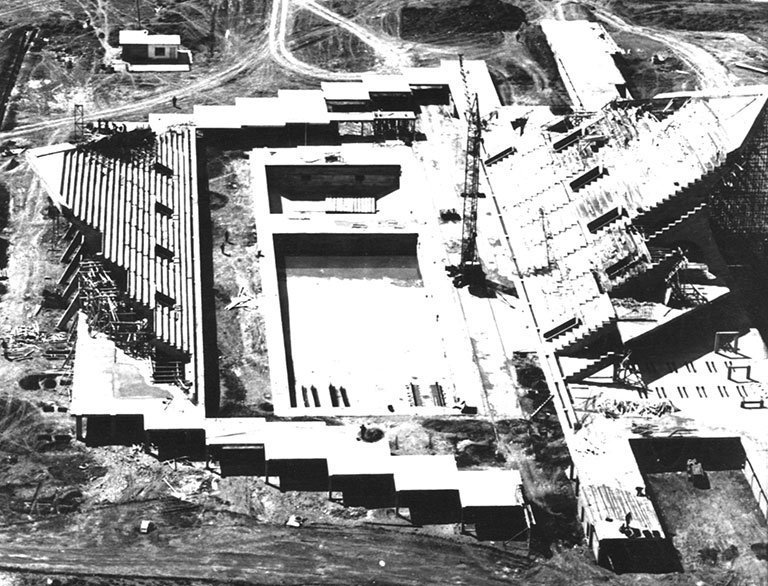
- Host venue at El Menzah under construction
- Location: Tunis, Tunisia
- Dates: 8–17 September 1967

The swimming events of the 1967 Mediterranean Games were held in Tunis, Tunisia. It was a long course (50 metres) event.

== Medallists ==
=== Men's events ===
Event	Gold		Silver		Bronze	
100 m freestyle	José Chicoy (ESP)	55.4	Pietro Boscaini (ITA)	55.7	Juan Fortuny (ESP)	56.0
400 m freestyle	Juan Fortuny (ESP)	4:22.5	Antonio Corell (ESP)	4:28.9	Riccardo Siniscalco (ITA)	4:29.1
100 m backstroke	Franco Del Campo (ITA)	1:02.3	Jesús Cabrera (ESP)	1:03.6	Jaime Monzó (ESP)	1:05.5
100 m breaststroke	Gian Corrado Gross (ITA)	1:10.2	José Duran (ESP)	1:12.5	Jorge Rubio (ESP)	1:13.8
200 m breaststroke	José Duran (ESP)	2:37.3	Maurizio Giovannini (ITA)	2:42.4	Nazario Padrón (ESP)	2:44.8
100 m butterfly	Nenad Kuriđa (YUG)	1:00.5	Giampiero Fossati (ITA)	1:00.5	Arturo Lang-Lenton (ESP)	1:01.0
4 × 100 m freestyle	Spain; José Chicoy; Espinosa; Martinez; Juan Fortuny	3:43.3	Italy; Pietro Boscaini; Ugo Targetti; Ezio Della Savia; Massimo Borracci	3:45.9	Tunisia	4:04.6
4 × 100 m medley	Italy; Franco Del Campo; Gian Corrado Gross; Giampiero Fossati; Pietro Boscaini	4:04.9	Spain; Julio Cabrera; José Durán; Arturo Lang-Lenton; José Chicoy	4:14.2	Tunisia	4:35.6

=== Women's events ===
Event	Gold		Silver		Bronze	
100 m freestyle	Maria Antonietta Strumolo (ITA)	1:03.1	Mara Sacchi (ITA)	1:04.5	Maria Teresa Bringas (ESP)	1:05.9
100 m backstroke	María Corominas (ESP)	1:11.7	Raffaella Cutolo (ITA)	1:14.3	Joséfina Teresa Perez (ESP)	1:18.2
100 m breaststroke	Zamora Gomez (ESP)	1:21.8	Laura Schiezzari (ITA)	1:21.9	Paola Alibertini (ITA)	1:23.9

== Medal table ==
* Host nation (Tunisia)

Rank	Nation	Gold	Silver	Bronze	Total
1	Spain	6	4	7	17
2	Italy	4	7	2	13
3	Yugoslavia	1	0	0	1
4	Tunisia*	0	0	2	2
Totals (4 entries)		11	11	11	33
