= Julio Cabrera (swimmer) =

Spanish swimmer (born 1942)

Personal information
- Full name: Julio Cabrera Balsa
- Born: 1 March 1942 (age 84) Las Palmas, Spain

Sport
- Sport: Swimming
Medal record
Men's swimming
Representing Spain
Summer Universiade
Bronze medal – third place	1963 Porto Alegre	200m backstroke
Mediterranean Games
Silver medal – second place	1967 Tunis	4x100 m medley

Julio Cabrera Balsa (Note: In this Spanish name, the first or paternal surname is Cabrera and the second or maternal family name is Balsa.) (born 1 March 1942) is a Spanish former backstroke swimmer who competed in the 1960 Summer Olympics.
