= Joseph Meyten =

Belgian swimmer

Personal information
- Born: 18 February 1947 (age 79) Antwerp, Belgium

Sport
- Sport: Swimming

Joseph Meyten (born 18 February 1947) is a Belgian former swimmer. He competed in the men's 100 metre butterfly at the 1968 Summer Olympics.
