= Danijel Vrhovšek =

Slovenian swimmer

Personal information
- Born: 8 September 1943 (age 82) Celje, Yugoslavia

Sport
- Sport: Swimming

Danijel Vrhovšek (born 8 September 1943) is a Slovenian former swimmer. He competed in the men's 100 metre backstroke at the 1968 Summer Olympics for Yugoslavia.
