= Ronnie Mills =

American swimmer (born 1951)

Personal information
- Full name: Ronald Parker Mills
- Nickname: "Ronnie"
- National team: United States
- Born: February 25, 1951 (age 75) Fort Worth, Texas, U.S.
- Height: 6 ft 4 in (1.93 m)
- Weight: 196 lb (89 kg)

Sport
- Sport: Swimming
- Strokes: Backstroke
- Club: Burford Aquatic Club
- College team: Southern Methodist University
- Coach: George McMillion; SMU; Don Easterling; University of Texas Arlington
Medal record
Men's swimming
Representing the United States
Olympic Games
Bronze medal – third place	1968 Mexico City	100 m backstroke

Ronald Parker Mills (born February 25, 1951) is an American former competition swimmer for Southern Methodist University and a 1968 Olympic medalist in the backstroke. He later had a career in advertising in the Dallas area.

Mills was born on February 25, 1951 in the Fort Worth, Texas area, and attended Arlington Heights High School.

In June 1968, at the age of 17, while swimming for Fort Worth's Burford Swim Club, coached by American Swimming Coaches Association Hall of Fame Coach Don Easterling, Mills won the 50-yard freestyle in 23.3 seconds in the Camp Carter swimming tournament. Easterling had a highly competitive program with the Burford Swim Club, and would coach the University of Texas at Arlington, before beginning a 24 year career with North Carolina State University from 1971-1995. Mills trained with Easterling at the University of Texas Arlington facility in preparation for the Olympics as well, though Mills would have been too young to enroll at the university.

== 1968 Olympics ==
Mills competed at the age of 17 at the 1968 Summer Olympics in Mexico City. Individually, he won a bronze medal for his third-place finish in the men's 100-meter backstroke with a time in the final heat of 1:00.5. He also swam the backstroke leg for the gold medal-winning U.S. team in the preliminary heats of the men's 4×100-meter medley relay.

After the Olympics, he attended Southern Methodist University in Dallas, Texas, where he swam for the SMU Mustangs swimming and diving team in National Collegiate Athletic Association (NCAA) competition. Mills received both a Bachelors and Masters in Business at SMU. In a January, 1971 meet against Arkansas while swimming for SMU, Mills placed first in the 200-yard Individual Medley with a time of 2:04.5. In March 1970, at the Southwestern Conference Championships at SMU, Mills set two Southwestern Conference records in the backstroke. His 1970 SWC Championship records included a 53.7 in the 100 backstroke, and a record time of 1:55.8 in the 200 backstroke. Mills went on to earn All-American honors and was the Southwest Conference champion in a total of eight individual swimming events over a three-year span. He also swam on an American record-setting relay team.

A strong advocate for swimming, after his return from the Olympics, Mills gave a presentation to the Fort Worth School Board to increase the number of High School Swimming teams in school district. He helped the Fort Worth School board pass a resolution that would significantly increase swimming teams and coaches provided by the high schools in the Fort Worth Independent School District. The bill would take effect in the 1969-1970 school year.

After working in the business sector for a number of years after his swimming career, Mills placed first in the 10-sport Dallas Superstars Decathlon in 1978, where he won against athletes on many of the Dallas area professional teams.

After his time in swimming and decathlon, Mills had a successful career in advertising working primarily in the Dallas area. After around twenty years in the advertising business, he retired from the industry around age 48, returning to his native Fort Worth and cared for his elderly parents. His retirement included frequent rounds of golf and tennis at Fort Worth's Ridglea Country Club, volunteer work, and management of two Fort Worth properties. A gifted golfer, he played with a 16 handicap in a weekly foursome whose results were frequently listed in local newspapers.

== Honors ==
Mills was inducted into the Texas Swimming Hall of Fame in April 2001.

== See also ==
- List of Olympic medalists in swimming (men)
- List of Southern Methodist University people
