= Larry Barbiere =

American swimmer

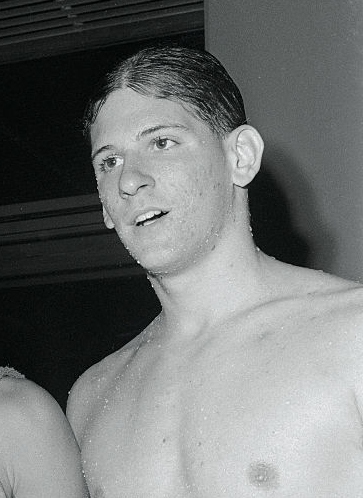
- Barbiere in 1967

Personal information
- Full name: Lawrence Edward Barbiere
- Nickname: "Larry"
- National team: United States
- Born: March 6, 1951 (age 75) Dayton, Ohio, U.S.
- Occupation: Attorney
- Height: 6 ft 2 in (1.88 m)
- Weight: 185 lb (84 kg)
- Spouses: Jane Johnson (May, 1980)

Sport
- Sport: Swimming
- Strokes: Backstroke
- Club: Vesper Boat Club
- College team: Indiana University
- Coach: Mary Freeman (Vespar Boat Club); James Counsilman (Indiana)

Lawrence Edward Barbiere (born March 6, 1951) is an American former competition swimmer, who competed for Indiana University and represented the United States in the 1968 Olympics in the 100-meter backstroke.

== Early life and swimming ==
Barbiere was born in Dayton, Ohio on March 6, 1951. In 1960 at the age of 9, he began commuting to Philadelphia's Vesper Boat Club, and later attended Medford, New Jersey's Lenape High School. At the Vespar Club, he trained and competed for Head Coach Mary Freeman, who founded the Vespar Boat Club swim team in 1955, and remained a coach through her retirement in 1968. A Hall of Fame recipient, Freeman also coached for the University of Pennsylvania. After the 1968 Olympics, Barbiere's family moved to Baltimore, where he spent his Senior year at Calvert Hall Prep, a boy's Catholic College Prep school in Towson, Maryland, where he graduated in 1969. In his Senior year at Calvert Prep, he was a Swimming Champion in the American Scholastic Swimming Association, and was made a member of the All America National Interscholastic Team.

At the AAU Middle Atlantic Swimming Championships, he won both events and set meet record times of 54.5 in the 100 backstroke, a 4:23.0 in the 400 Individual Medley.

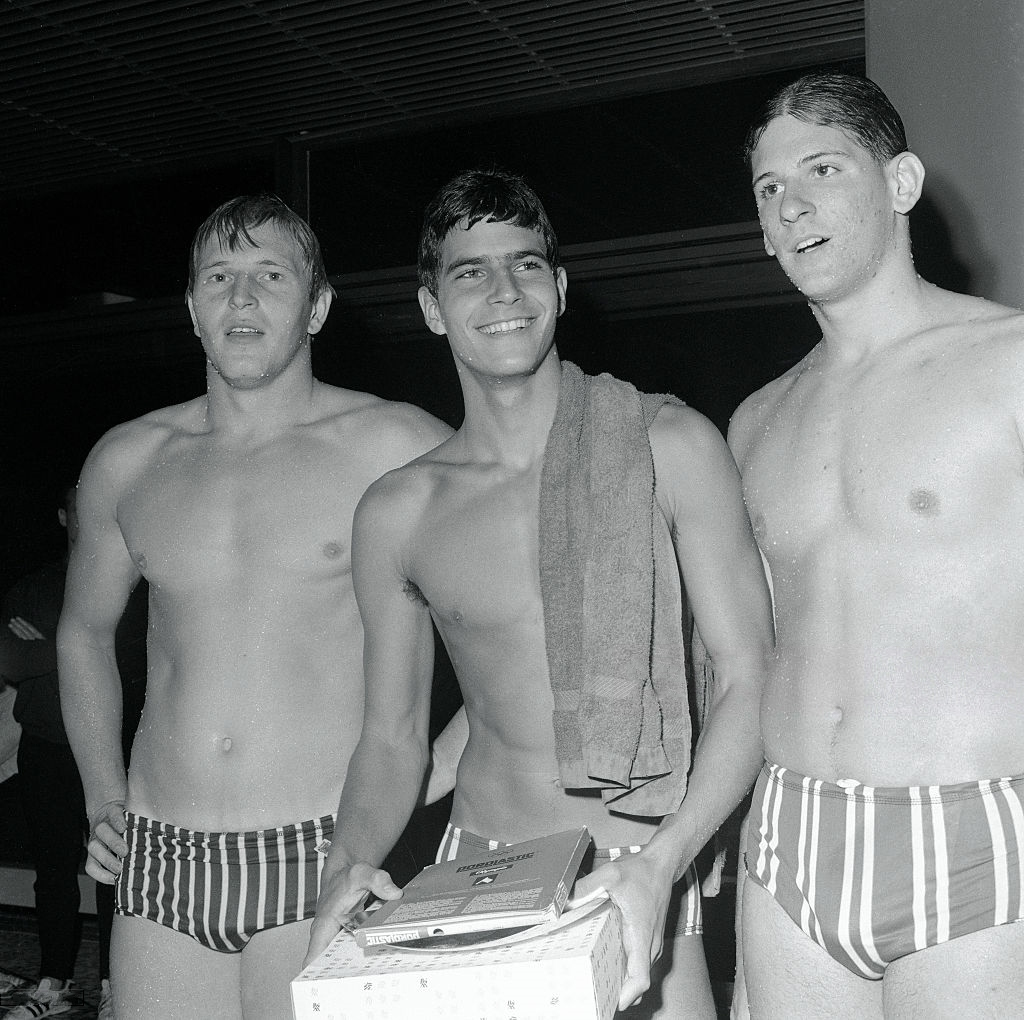
l. to r., W. Freitag, Mark Spitz, Barbiere, 1967

In August 1968, as a High School Junior, he won the AAU Nationals in the 100-meter backstroke, defeating Indiana student Charles Hickcox. In preparation for the Olympics in 1968, he swam twice a day at the Vespar Club's Kelly pool in Philadelphia, making the long drive from his home in Medford Lakes, New Jersey.

== 1968 Mexico City Olympics ==
Barbiere qualified for the Olympic team placing third at the 100-meter backstroke finals at the 1968 Olympic trials in Long Beach, California. He had entered in both the 100 and 200-meter backstroke and both the 200-meter Individual Medley and butterfly events. Before travelling to Mexico City, the U.S. swim team performed altitude adjustment training at Colorado Springs, Colorado under 1968 Olympic Head Coach George Haines.

After travelling with the team, he represented the United States as a 17-year-old at the 1968 Summer Olympics in Mexico City, competed in the men's 100-meter backstroke, and finished fourth in the event final with a time of 1:01.1, finishing only .6 seconds behind American bronze medalist Ronnie Mills.

=== Indiana University ===
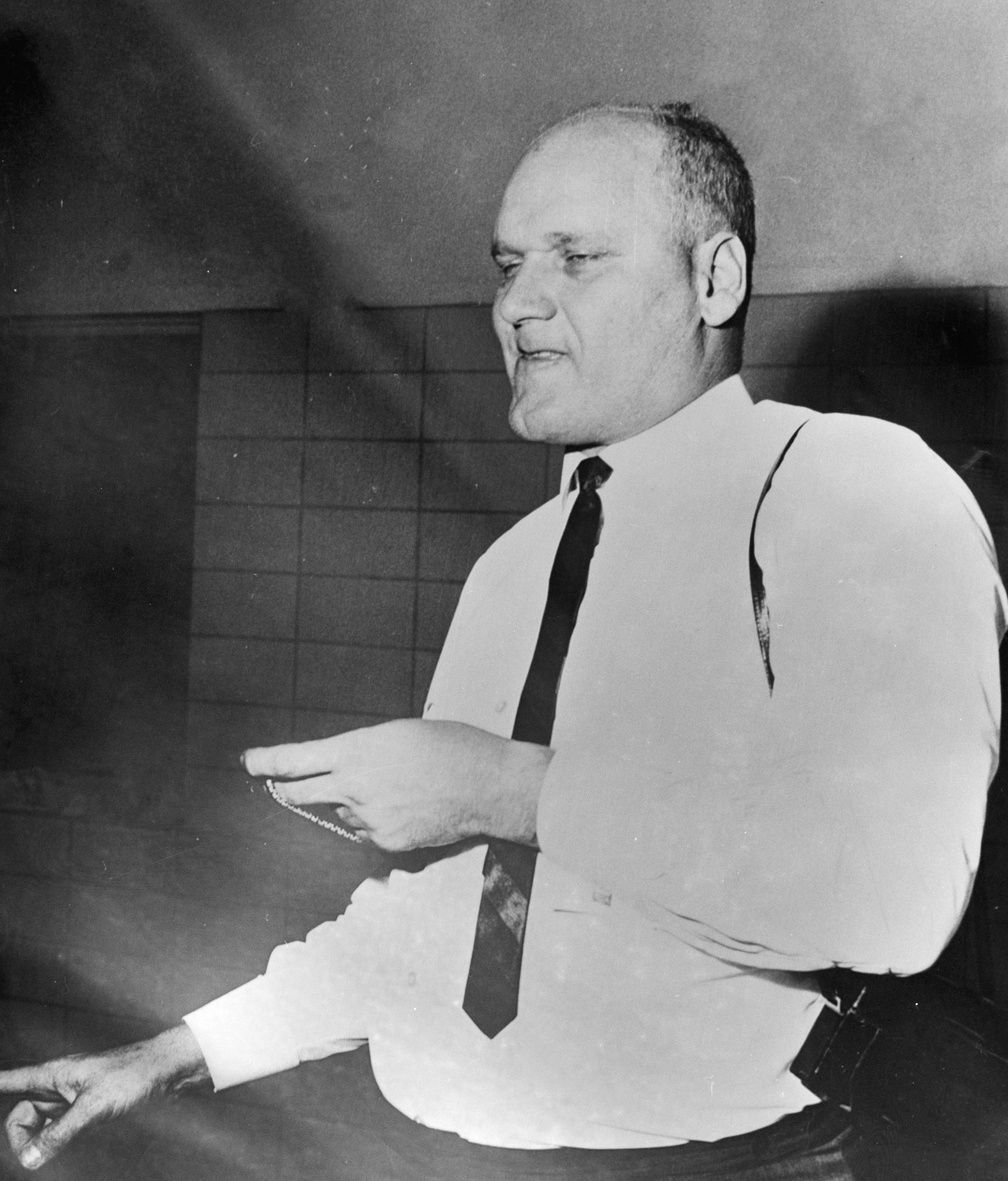
Coach James Counsilman

He attended Indiana University in Bloomington, Indiana, where he swam for coach Doc Counsilman's Indiana Hoosiers swimming and diving team in National Collegiate Athletic Association (NCAA) and Big Ten Conference competition from 1970 to 1973, earning a varsity swimming letter in each of the four years of his participation from 1970-1973. In one of his first NCAA titles in 1970 he captured the individual 100 yard backstroke title. He was an eleven-time All-American as an Indiana swimmer, and was a key member of the Hoosiers' three consecutive NCAA national championship teams in 1971, 1972 and 1973. In conference competition in the Big 10 in 1970, he captured individual championships in the 100 and 200 backstrokes. In 1970 Big Ten competition, he was also an individual champion in the 200 IM individual medley and swam backstroke on a winning Indiana 400-medley relay team.

=== Post-swimming careers ===
After graduating Indiana, he studied Law at the University of Cincinnati College of Law, passed the bar in Ohio, and practiced in Cincinnati. While in Cincinnati, he served as an Assistant Coach for three years for the Cincinnati Marlins Swim Club. On May 17, 1980, he married Jane Johnson at St. Hilary Church in Cincinnati. Johnson was a graduate of Miami University where she was a member of Alpha Phi. After a honeymoon in Naples, Florida, the couple planned to live in Cincinnati, where Barbiere had been practicing law.

Barbiere's son Jim also attended Indiana University and competed for the Hoosiers swim team from 2009 to 2013. His niece, swimmer Emily Silver, won a silver medal at the 2008 Olympics.

=== Honors ===
Barbiere was inducted into the Indiana University Athletic Hall of Fame in 2013.

== See also ==
- List of Indiana University (Bloomington) people
