= Leonid Dobroskokin =

Russian swimmer

Personal information
- Nationality: Russian
- Born: 13 February 1952 (age 74) Voronezh, Russia

Sport
- Sport: Swimming

Leonid Dobroskokin (born 13 February 1952) is a Russian former swimmer. He competed in the men's 200 metre backstroke at the 1968 Summer Olympics for the Soviet Union.
