= Juan Fortuny =

Spanish swimmer (1946–2024)

Personal information
- Full name: Juan Fortuny Vidal
- Born: 12 May 1946 Barcelona, Spain
- Died: 9 February 2024 (aged 77)

Sport
- Sport: Swimming
Medal record
Men's swimming
Representing Spain
Mediterranean Games
Gold medal – first place	1967 Tunis	400 m freestyle
Gold medal – first place	1967 Tunis	4x100 m freestyle
Bronze medal – third place	1967 Tunis	100 m freestyle

Juan Fortuny Vidal (Note: In this Spanish name, the first or paternal surname is Fortuny and the second or maternal family name is Vidal.) (also spelled Joan, 12 May 1946 – 9 February 2024) was a Spanish freestyle and medley swimmer who competed in the 1964 Summer Olympics and in the 1968 Summer Olympics. Fortuny died on 9 February 2024, at the age of 77.
