= Yevgeny Spiridonov =

Russian swimmer

Personal information
- Born: 16 March 1947 (age 79) Saint Petersburg, Soviet Union

Sport
- Sport: Swimming

Yevgeny Spiridonov (born 16 March 1947) is a Russian former swimmer. He competed in the men's 100 metre backstroke at the 1968 Summer Olympics for the Soviet Union.
