= Horst-Günter Gregor =

East German swimmer (1938–1995)

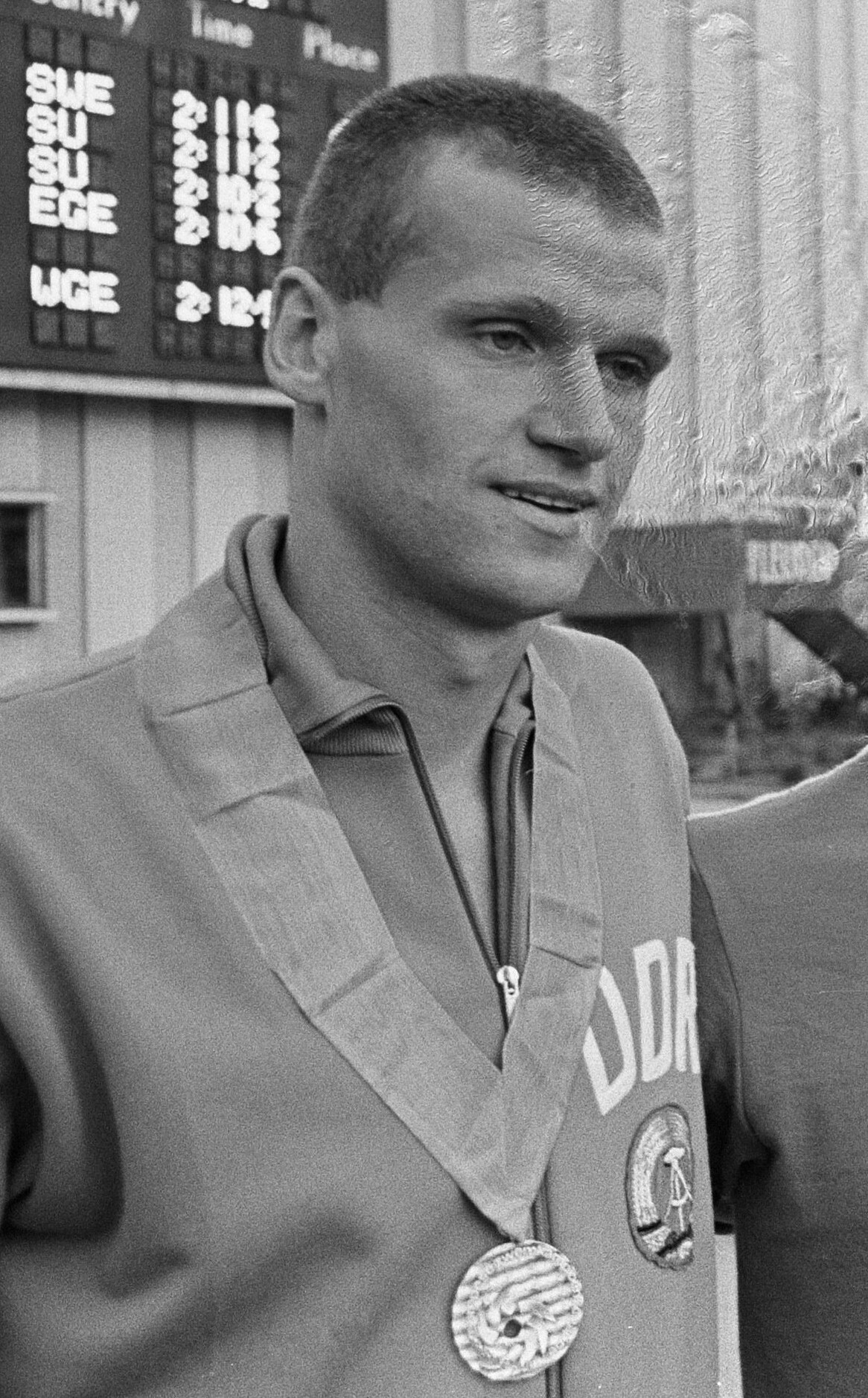
- Gregor in 1966

Personal information
- Born: 24 July 1938 Elbing, West Prussia, Germany (modern Elbląg, Poland)
- Died: 25 April 1995 (aged 56) Leipzig, Germany
- Height: 1.89 m (6 ft 2 in)
- Weight: 70 kg (154 lb)

Sport
- Sport: Swimming
- Club: SC Magdeburg, Magdeburg; SC DHfK, Leipzig
Medal record
Olympic Games
Representing Germany
Silver medal – second place	1964 Tokyo	4x100 m freestyle
Silver medal – second place	1964 Tokyo	4x100 m medley
Representing East Germany
Silver medal – second place	1968 Mexico	4x100 m medley relay
European Championships
Representing East Germany
Gold medal – first place	1962 Leipzig	4×100 m medley
Gold medal – first place	1966 Utrecht	4×100 m freestyle
Silver medal – second place	1966 Utrecht	4×200 m freestyle
Silver medal – second place	1966 Utrecht	4×100 m medley
Silver medal – second place	1966 Utrecht	200 m butterfly

Horst-Günter Gregor (24 July 1938 – 25 April 1995) was a German swimmer. He competed in the 1964 and 1968 Summer Olympics and won three silver medals in relay events. He also won five medals, including two gold medals, at the European championships in 1962 and 1966.

Nationally, he won 21 titles, including those in 100 m butterfly (1962, 1963 and 1966), 200 m butterfly (1964, 1965, 1966 and 1968) and 100 m freestyle (1956–1959, 1962, 1966 and 1968).

He married the swimmer Bärbel Walter. Their son, Jens Gregor, also became a competitive swimmer. In 1961, Horst-Günter completed his studies in civil engineering. From 1979 to 1992 he was director of the State Secretariat for Physical Culture and Sports, and then chairman of the Saxon Swimming Association.

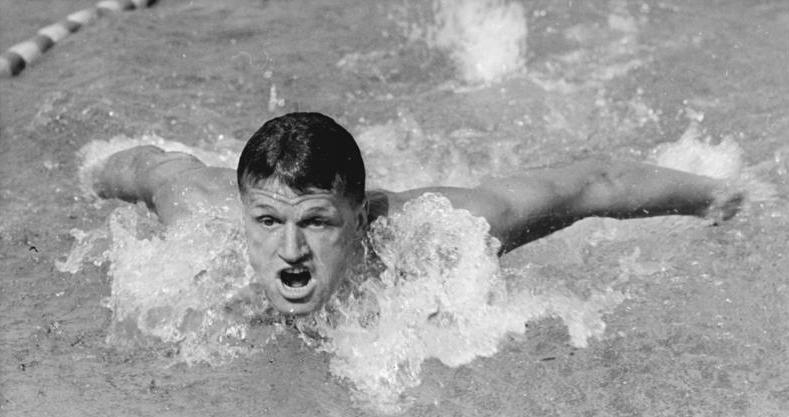
Gregor in 1971
