= Giampiero Fossati =

Italian swimmer (born 1944)

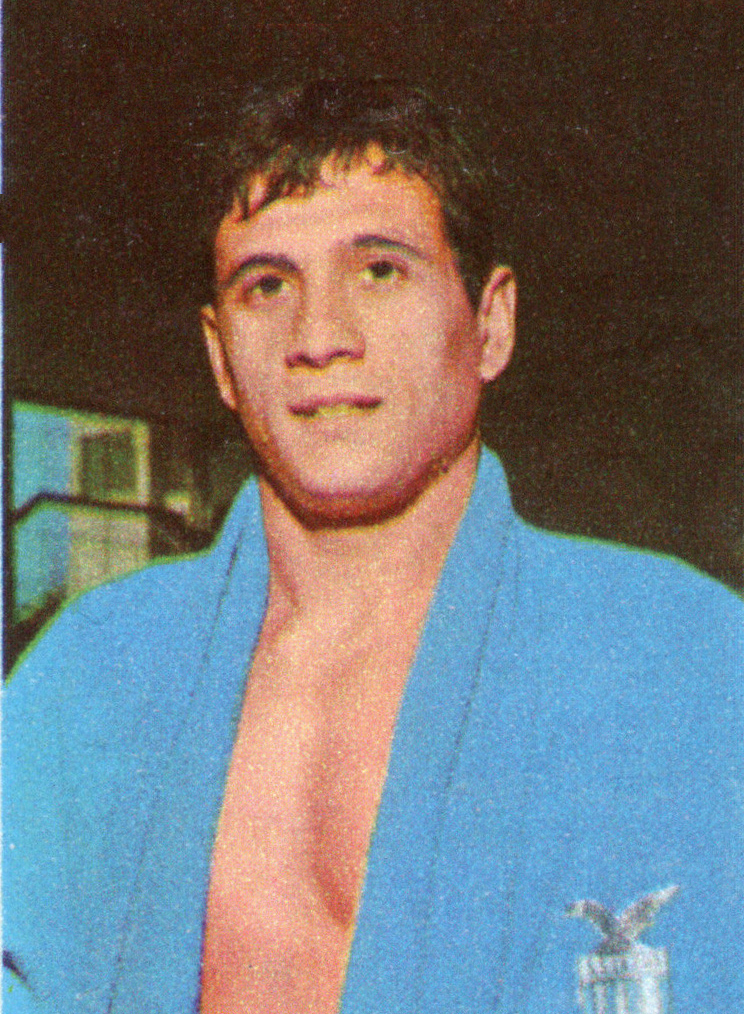

Personal information
- Born: 13 April 1944 (age 82) Genoa, Italy
- Height: 1.70 m (5 ft 7 in)
- Weight: 65 kg (143 lb)

Sport
- Sport: Swimming
- Club: Circolo Canottieri, Napoli
Medal record
Men's swimming
Representing Italy
Mediterranean Games
Gold medal – first place	1963 Naples	4×100 m medley
Gold medal – first place	1967 Tunis	4×100 m medley
Silver medal – second place	1967 Tunis	100 m butterfly

Giampiero Fossati (born 13 April 1944) is a retired Italian butterfly swimmer. He competed at the 1960, 1964 and 1968 Olympics with the best result of seventh place in the 4 × 100 m medley relay in 1964. He never reached a final in his individual events. Fossati won two gold medals at the Mediterranean Games in the medley relay.
