= Jerry Anderson (diver) =

Puerto Rican diver

Personal information
- Nationality: Puerto Rican
- Born: 23 February 1932 Hastings, Nebraska, United States
- Died: 19 February 2009 (aged 76) Hollywood, Florida, United States

Sport
- Sport: Diving

Jerry Anderson (23 February 1932 – 19 February 2009) was a Puerto Rican diver. He competed at the 1964 Summer Olympics and the 1968 Summer Olympics.
