= Massimo Sacchi =

Italian swimmer

Personal information
- Born: 17 May 1950 (age 76) Milan, Italy

Sport
- Sport: Swimming

Massimo Sacchi (born 17 May 1950) is an Italian former swimmer. He competed in the men's 4 × 100 metre medley relay at the 1968 Summer Olympics.
