= Pietro Boscaini =

Italian swimmer (1947–1973)

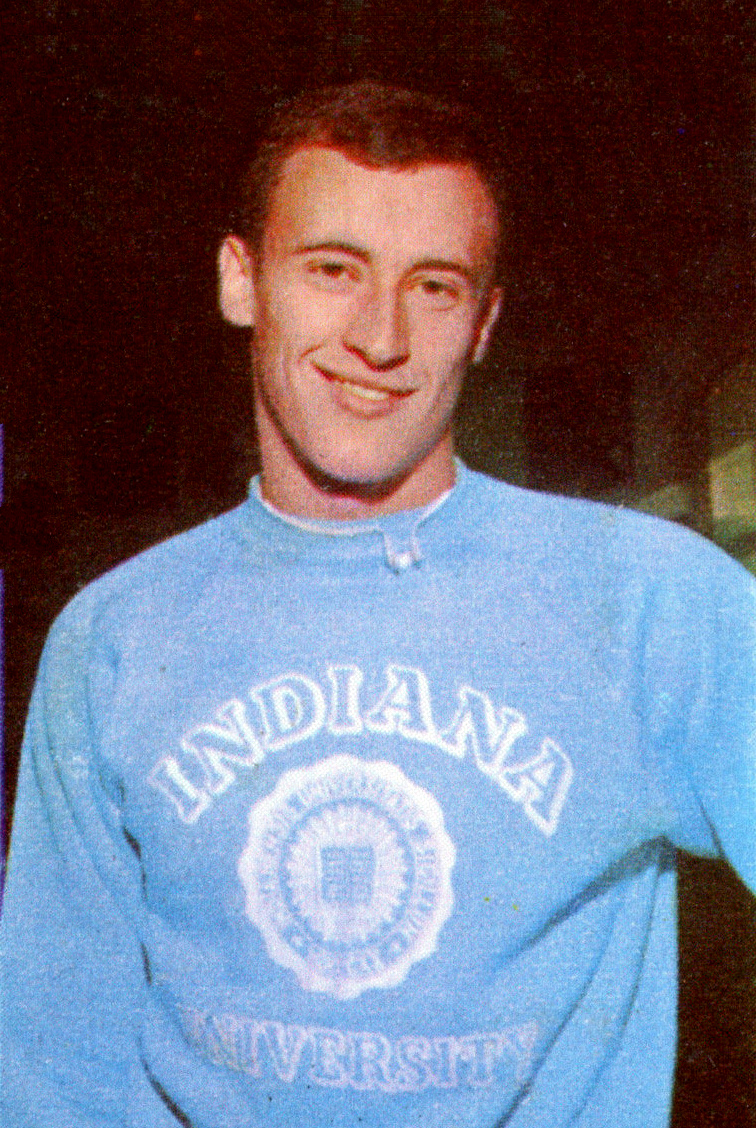
- Boscaini in 1967

Personal information
- Born: 22 April 1947 Rome, Italy
- Died: 30 June 1973 (aged 26) Isola di Montecristo, Livorno, Italy
- Height: 1.90 m (6 ft 3 in)
- Weight: 84 kg (185 lb)

Sport
- Sport: Swimming
- Club: SS Lazio, Rome
Medal record
Men's swimming
Representing Italy
Mediterranean Games
Gold medal – first place	1967 Tunis	4×100 m medley
Silver medal – second place	1967 Tunis	100 m freestyle
Silver medal – second place	1967 Tunis	4x100 m freestyle

Pietro Boscaini (22 April 1947 – 30 June 1973) was an Italian freestyle swimmer. He competed at the 1964 and 1968 Olympics in five events in total and reached the finals of the 4 × 100 m medley and 4 × 200 m freestyle relays. He died in a diving accident, aged 26.
