= Liana Vicens =

Puerto Rican swimmer (born 1956)

Personal information
- Born: 25 November 1956 (age 69) Ponce, Puerto Rico

Sport
- Sport: Swimming

Liana Vicens (born 25 November 1956) is an American former swimmer from Puerto Rico. She competed in four events at the 1968 Summer Olympics. At 11 years old, she remained the youngest known competitor in the history of the Olympic Games as of 2016. Her son, Tomás Nido, is a catcher for the Detroit Tigers.
