= Jaime Monzó =

Spanish swimmer (1946–2020)

Personal information
- Full name: Jaime Monzó Cots
- Born: 31 October 1946 Barcelona, Spain
- Died: 7 January 2020 (aged 73) Barcelona], Spain
- Height: 1.77 m (5 ft 10 in)
- Weight: 69 kg (152 lb)

Sport
- Sport: Swimming
- Club: CN Montjuic, Barcelona
Medal record
Men's swimming
Representing Spain
European Championships
Silver medal – second place	1966 Utrecht	200 m backstroke
Mediterranean Games
Bronze medal – third place	1967 Tunis	100 m backstroke

Jaime Monzó Cots (Note: In this Spanish name, the first or paternal surname is Monzó and the second or maternal family name is Cots.) (also spelled Jaume, 31 October 1946 – 7 January 2020) was a Spanish swimmer who won a silver medal in the 200 m backstroke at the 1966 European Aquatics Championships. He competed in the same event at the 1968 Summer Olympics, but did not reach the finals.
