= Rafael Batista (sport shooter) =

Puerto Rican sports shooter

Personal information
- Born: 6 March 1951 (age 75)

Sport
- Sport: Sports shooting

Rafael Batista (born 6 March 1951) is a Puerto Rican former sports shooter. He competed at the 1968, 1972 and the 1976 Summer Olympics.
