= Joachim Rother =

German swimmer

Personal information
- Born: 5 March 1948 Chemnitz, Germany
- Died: 12 September 2021 (aged 73)
- Height: 1.70 m (5 ft 7 in)
- Weight: 70 kg (150 lb)

Sport
- Sport: Swimming
- Club: SC Karl-Marx-Stadt, Chemnitz
Medal record
Men's swimming
Representing East Germany
European Championships
Bronze medal – third place	1966 Utrecht	200 m backstroke

Joachim Röther (5 March 1948 – 12 September 2021) was a German backstroke swimmer who won a bronze medal in the 200 m backstroke at the 1966 European Aquatics Championships. He also competed at the 1968 Summer Olympics and finished seventh in the same event.
