= José Durán (swimmer) =

Spanish swimmer (born 1951)

Personal information
- Full name: José Durán Noguera
- Born: 8 July 1951 Sabadell, Catalonia, Spain
- Died: 11 June 2026 (aged 74)

Sport
- Sport: Swimming
Medal record
Men's swimming
Representing Spain
Mediterranean Games
Gold medal – first place	1967 Tunis	200 m breaststroke
Silver medal – second place	1967 Tunis	100 m breaststroke
Silver medal – second place	1967 Tunis	4x100 m medley

José Durán Noguera (Note: In this Spanish name, the first or paternal surname is Durán and the second or maternal family name is Noguera.) (Catalan: Josep Duran i Noguera, 8 July 1951 – 11 June 2026) was a Spanish swimmer who competed in the 1968 Summer Olympics.
