= Vladimir Nemshilov =

Soviet swimmer (born 1948)

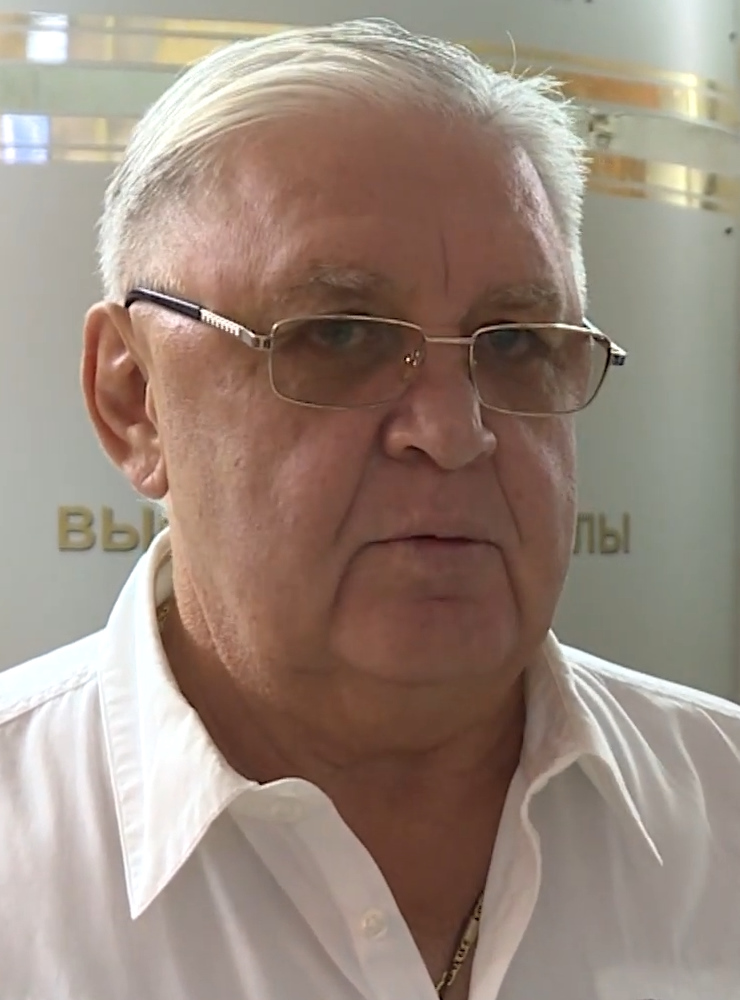
- Nemshilov in 2018

Personal information
- Born: 24 November 1948 (age 77) Sochi, Russian SFSR, Soviet Union
- Height: 1.80 m (5 ft 11 in)
- Weight: 72 kg (159 lb)

Sport
- Sport: Swimming
- Club: Dynamo Sochi
Medal record
Representing Soviet Union
Summer Olympics
Bronze medal – third place	1968 Mexico City	4×100 m medley
European Championships
Bronze medal – third place	1970 Barcelona	100 m butterfly
Bronze medal – third place	1970 Barcelona	4×100 m medley

Vladimir Konstantinovich Nemshilov (Russian: Владимир Константинович Немшилов; born 24 November 1948) is a retired Soviet swimmer. He won a bronze medal in the 4×100 m medley relay and finished fourth in the 100 m butterfly at the 1968 Summer Olympics, setting a new European record (US swimmers took the first three places). He won two bronze medals in the same events at the 1970 European Aquatics Championships. In 1969, he set a European record in the 100 m butterfly event. During his career he won nine national titles, in the 100 m (1968–1971, 1973, 1974) and 200 m (1973) butterfly and 4×100 m medley relay events (1974, 1975), and set four national records.

Since the introduction of masters championships in the Soviet Union he competes in this category. He won the world championships in 1992 and European championships in 1995 in the 50 m butterfly, and finished second in the 100 m butterfly in 1995.

He lives in Moscow where he works as a swimming coach. He regularly visits his mother and elder sister Nina in Sochi, the city where he was born and raised. Since 2008, the local swimming championships carry his name. In 2010, they were attended by four former Olympians, and one of them, Alex Popov, even took part in a swimming event.
