= Héctor Bas =

Puerto Rican diver

Personal information
- Nationality: Puerto Rican
- Born: 20 January 1951 (age 74)

Sport
- Sport: Diving

Héctor Bas (born 20 January 1951) is a Puerto Rican diver. He competed at the 1968 Summer Olympics and the 1972 Summer Olympics.
