= Jesús Cabrera =

Spanish swimmer (born 1945)

Personal information
- Full name: Jesús Cabrera Balsa
- Born: 6 December 1945 (age 80) Las Palmas, Spain

Sport
- Sport: Swimming
Medal record
Men's swimming
Representing Spain
Mediterranean Games
Gold medal – first place	1963 Naples	200 m backstroke
Silver medal – second place	1967 Tunis	100 m backstroke
Silver medal – second place	1967 Tunis	4×100 m medley

Jesús Cabrera Balsa (Note: In this Spanish name, the first or paternal surname is Cabrera and the second or maternal family name is Balsa.) (born 6 December 1945) is a Spanish former backstroke swimmer. He competed at the 1964 Summer Olympics and the 1968 Summer Olympics.
