= Yuriy Hromak =

Ukrainian swimmer

Personal information
- Born: 26 March 1948 Lviv, Ukrainian SSR, Soviet Union
- Died: 14 December 1998 (aged 50)
- Height: 1.88 m (6 ft 2 in)
- Weight: 88 kg (194 lb)

Sport
- Sport: Swimming
- Club: Dynamo Lviv
Medal record
Representing the Soviet Union
Olympic Games
Bronze medal – third place	1968 Mexico	4×100 m medley relay
European Championships
Gold medal – first place	1966 Utrecht	200 m backstroke

Yuri Petrovich Hromak (Ukrainian: Yuriy Petrovych Hromak; Russian: Юрій Петрович Громак; 26 March 1948 – 14 December 1998) was a Ukrainian former backstroke swimmer. He won a bronze medal in the 4 × 100 m medley relay at the 1968 Summer Olympics and a European gold in the 200 backstroke in 1966. During his short career, he won two national titles, in the 100 m and 200 m backstroke in 1967. He retired in 1970.
