= Chan King-ming (swimmer) =

Hong Kong swimmer

Personal information
- Born: 17 March 1954 (age 72) Canton, China

Sport
- Sport: Swimming

Chan King-ming
- Traditional Chinese: 陳景明
- Hanyu Pinyin: Chén Jǐngmíng
- Yale Romanization: Chàhn Gíngmihng

Chan King-ming (Chinese: 陳景明; born 17 March 1954) is a Hong Kong backstroke and medley swimmer who represented the Republic of China (Taiwan) in international competition. He competed in two events at the 1968 Summer Olympics. He later competed in swimming at the 1970 Asian Games.
