= Ana Marcial =

Puerto Rican swimmer (born 1953)

Personal information
- Born: 31 July 1953 (age 72) San Juan, Puerto Rico

Sport
- Sport: Swimming
Medal record
Representing Puerto Rico
Pan American Games
Bronze medal – third place	1967 Winnipeg	4x100m freestyle relay

Ana Marcial (born 31 July 1953) is a Puerto Rican former swimmer. She competed in three events at the 1968 Summer Olympics.
