= José Chicoy =

Spanish swimmer

Personal information
- Full name: José Antonio Chicoy Massa
- Born: 2 November 1947 (age 78) Madrid, Spain

Sport
- Sport: Swimming
Medal record
Men's swimming
Representing Spain
Mediterranean Games
Gold medal – first place	1967 Tunis	100 m freestyle
Gold medal – first place	1967 Tunis	4x100 m freestyle
Silver medal – second place	1967 Tunis	4x100 m medley

José Antonio Chicoy Massa (Note: In this Spanish name, the first or paternal surname is Chicoy and the second or maternal family name is Massa.) (born 2 November 1947) is a Spanish former swimmer who competed in the 1968 Summer Olympics. He was born in Madrid.
