= Ayis Capéronis =

Swiss swimmer

Aris Capéronis
Personal information
- Born: 21 March 1950 (age 76) Lausanne, Switzerland

Sport
- Sport: Swimming

Aris Capéronis (born 21 March 1950) is a Swiss former butterfly swimmer. He competed in two events at the 1968 Summer Olympics.
