= Bo Westergren =

Swedish swimmer (born 1950)

Personal information
- Full name: Bo Åke Westergren
- Born: 23 May 1950 (age 76) Stockholm, Sweden

Sport
- Sport: Swimming

Bo Åke Westergren (born 23 May 1950) is a Swedish former butterfly and freestyle swimmer. He competed in three events at the 1968 Summer Olympics.

Westergren represented Stockholmspolisens IF.
