= Jorge González (swimmer) =

Puerto Rican swimmer (born 1949)

Personal information
- National team: Puerto Rico
- Born: 5 January 1949 (age 77) Havana, Cuba
- Height: 182 cm (6 ft 0 in)
- Weight: 75 kg (165 lb)

Sport
- Sport: Swimming

Jorge González (born 5 January 1949) is a Puerto Rican former swimmer. He competed in six events at the 1968 Summer Olympics.
