= Tom Arusoo =

Canadian swimmer (born 1948)

Personal information
- Full name: Toomas Arusoo
- Nickname: "Tom"
- National team: Canada
- Born: July 22, 1948 (age 77) Stockholm, Sweden
- Height: 1.75 m (5 ft 9 in)
- Weight: 73 kg (161 lb)

Sport
- Sport: Swimming
- Strokes: Butterfly
- College team: University of Michigan
Medal record
Men's swimming
Representing Canada
Commonwealth Games
Gold medal – first place	1970 Edinburgh	200 m butterfly
Silver medal – second place	1970 Edinburgh	100 m butterfly
Bronze medal – third place	1966 Kingston	220 yd butterfly
Pan American Games
Silver medal – second place	1967 Winnipeg	200 m butterfly

Toomas "Tom" Arusoo (born July 22, 1948) was a Canadian competition swimmer who swam for Canada in several international meets including the 1968 Summer Olympics in Mexico City.

== Early life ==
Tom Arusoo's parents were both competitive athletes in Estonia; his father was a national champion swimmer in long-distance freestyle, and his mother was the second-ranked tennis player in the country. They emigrated to Sweden in 1944 as refugees, where their son Toomas was born. They then emigrated to Canada, settling in Montreal.

== Swimming career ==
As a child, Arusoo started competitively swimming for the Montreal Athletic Association, specializing in the butterfly stroke. While in high school, he dated the granddaughter of American swimming coach Matt Mann. After watching Arusoo swim, Mann recommended him to the University of Michigan swimming coach. The university offered Arusoo a scholarship and he swam for the Michigan Wolverines swimming and diving team in National Collegiate Athletic Association (NCAA) and Big Ten Conference competition.

Arusoo first swam for Canada at the 1966 British Empire and Commonwealth Games, and then at the 1967 Pan American Games.

At the 1968 Summer Olympics, Arusoo was a member of Canada's seventh-place 4x100-metre medley relay team, swimming the butterfly leg. He also competed in the preliminary heats of the 100 and 200-metre butterfly events, but failed to advance.

At his final international meet, the 1970 Commonwealth Games in Edinburgh, Arusoo won the gold medal in the 200-metre butterfly (2:08.97). In the 100-metre butterfly, he was part of the first-ever Canadian sweep of the podium at an international games, winning silver in 58.98 seconds and joined by gold medallist Byron MacDonald and bronze medallist Ron Jacks.

== After swimming ==
In 1973, Arusoo married fellow Canadian Olympian swimmer Angela Coughlan. They had three daughters before the couple divorced ten years later.

Arusoo became a swimming coach at the Pointe Claire Aquatic Centre under International Swimming Hall of Fame coach George Gate, who had been the coach of the 1968 Olympic team.

Arusoo also coached the Liquid Lightning Swim Club in Lake Orion, Michigan, and the Great Lakes Aquatics Akitas (North) swim team located in Holly, Michigan.

== See also ==
- List of Commonwealth Games medallists in swimming (men)
- List of University of Michigan alumni
