= Michael Goodner =

Puerto Rican swimmer (born 1953)

Personal information
- Born: March 14, 1953 (age 73)

Sport
- Sport: Swimming
Medal record
Representing Puerto Rico
Central American and Caribbean Games
Gold medal – first place	1970 Panama City	4x100m freestyle relay

Michael Goodner (born 14 March 1953) is a Puerto Rican former swimmer who competed in the 1968 Summer Olympics.
