= Arturo Lang-Lenton =

Spanish swimmer (born 1949)

Personal information
- Full name: Arturo Lang-Lenton León
- Born: 28 January 1949 (age 77) Las Palmas, Spain

Sport
- Sport: Swimming
Medal record
Men's swimming
Representing Spain
Mediterranean Games
Gold medal – first place	1971 Izmir	100m butterfly
Gold medal – first place	1971 Izmir	4x100m medley relay
Silver medal – second place	1967 Tunis	4x100 m medley
Silver medal – second place	1971 Izmir	200m butterfly
Bronze medal – third place	1967 Tunis	100 m butterfly

Arturo Lang-Lenton León (Note: In this Spanish name, the first or paternal surname is Lang-Lenton and the second or maternal family name is León.) (born 28 January 1949) is a Spanish former swimmer who competed in the 1968 Summer Olympics and in the 1972 Summer Olympics. He was born in Las Palmas.
