= Robert Cusack =

Australian swimmer (born 1950)

Personal information
- Full name: Robert Stephen Cusack
- National team: Australia
- Born: 10 December 1950 (age 75) Maryborough, Queensland
- Height: 1.71 m (5 ft 7 in)
- Weight: 70 kg (150 lb)

Sport
- Sport: Swimming
- Strokes: Freestyle, butterfly
Medal record
Men's swimming
Representing Australia
Olympic Games
Bronze medal – third place	1968 Mexico City	4x100 m freestyle

Robert Stephen Cusack (born 10 December 1950) is an Australian former butterfly and freestyle swimmer of the 1960s and 1970s, who won a bronze medal in the 4x100-metre freestyle relay at the 1968 Summer Olympics in Mexico City.

Born in Maryborough, Queensland, his uncle was Arthur Cusack, the coach of double Olympic backstroke champion David Theile who also came from Maryborough. Cusack combined with Michael Wenden, Bob Windle and Greg Rogers to win bronze in the 4x100-metre freestyle relay, behind the United States and the Soviet Union teams. He also competed in the medley relay, missing bronze by 0.1 of a second, the 100-metre butterfly, finishing eighth in the final and the 200-metre butterfly being eliminated in the heats.

He first started competitive swimming at age 9, coached by his father Robert Cusack, and then later during his summer vacations he would travel to Brisbane to train with his uncle Arthur Cusack at the Centenary Pool, Brisbane where his uncle was the lessee of the pool. His uncle went on to coach him into the Australian Olympic team for the 1968 Summer Olympics in Mexico City.

He recalled these days training with his uncle in an interview in 2004, " We'd train seven miles a day, three sessions a day all through the holidays. Then at night time we'd get into the diving pools and search the bottom for any loose change."

He later went on to become a professional coach commencing at the Indooroopilly Swimming Club in 1977 until his retirement in 2013. He has trained numerous state and national swimmers from the club including his own son Simon Cusack who was an Australian national age finalist.

In 2004 in honour of his dedication and commitment to swimming, the community bestowed the honour of naming the swimming pool at Indooroopily after Robert Cusack.

== See also ==
- List of Olympic medalists in swimming (men)

== Bibliography ==
- Andrews, Malcolm (2000). Australia at the Olympic Games. Sydney, New South Wales: ABC Books. p. 112. ISBN 0-7333-0884-8.
