= Yury Suzdaltsev =

Russian swimmer

Personal information
- Nationality: Russian
- Born: 16 November 1945 (age 80) Astrakhan, Soviet Union

Sport
- Sport: Swimming

Yury Suzdaltsev (born 16 November 1945) is a Russian former swimmer. He competed in two events at the 1968 Summer Olympics for the Soviet Union.
