= Lutz Stoklasa =

German swimmer

Personal information
- Born: 23 December 1949 (age 76) Langewiesen, East Germany
- Height: 188 cm (6 ft 2 in)
- Weight: 80 kg (176 lb)

Sport
- Sport: Swimming
- Club: Wacker Burghausen, Burghausen (GER)
Medal record
Men's swimming (West Germany)
Representing Wacker Burghausen
Gold medal – first place	1966 championships	100 m butterfly stroke
Gold medal – first place	1967 championships	100 m butterfly stroke
Gold medal – first place	1967 championships	200 m butterfly stroke
Gold medal – first place	1968 championships	100 m butterfly stroke
Gold medal – first place	1968 championships	200 m butterfly stroke
Gold medal – first place	1969 championships	100 m butterfly stroke
Gold medal – first place	1971 championships	100 m butterfly stroke
Gold medal – first place	1975 championships	100 m butterfly stroke

Lutz Stoklasa (born 23 December 1949) is a German former swimmer. He competed at the 1968 Summer Olympics and the 1972 Summer Olympics.

As of 2021, he is a general practitioner in Wyk auf Föhr.

== West German championships ==
From 1966 to 1975, Stoklasa won eight West German championships:

- 100 m butterfly stroke: 1966, 1967, 1968, 1969, 1971 and 1975.
- 200 m butterfly stroke: 1967 and 1968.
