= Kishio Tanaka =

Japanese swimmer (born 1946)

Personal information
- Born: 15 September 1946 (age 79) Hiroshima, Japan

Sport
- Sport: Swimming
Medal record
Representing Japan
Asian Games
Silver medal – second place	1966 Bangkok	100m backstroke

Kishio Tanaka (田中 毅司雄, Tanaka Kishio; born 15 September 1946) is a Japanese former backstroke swimmer. He competed in two events at the 1968 Summer Olympics.
