= Franco Chino =

Italian swimmer (born 1948)

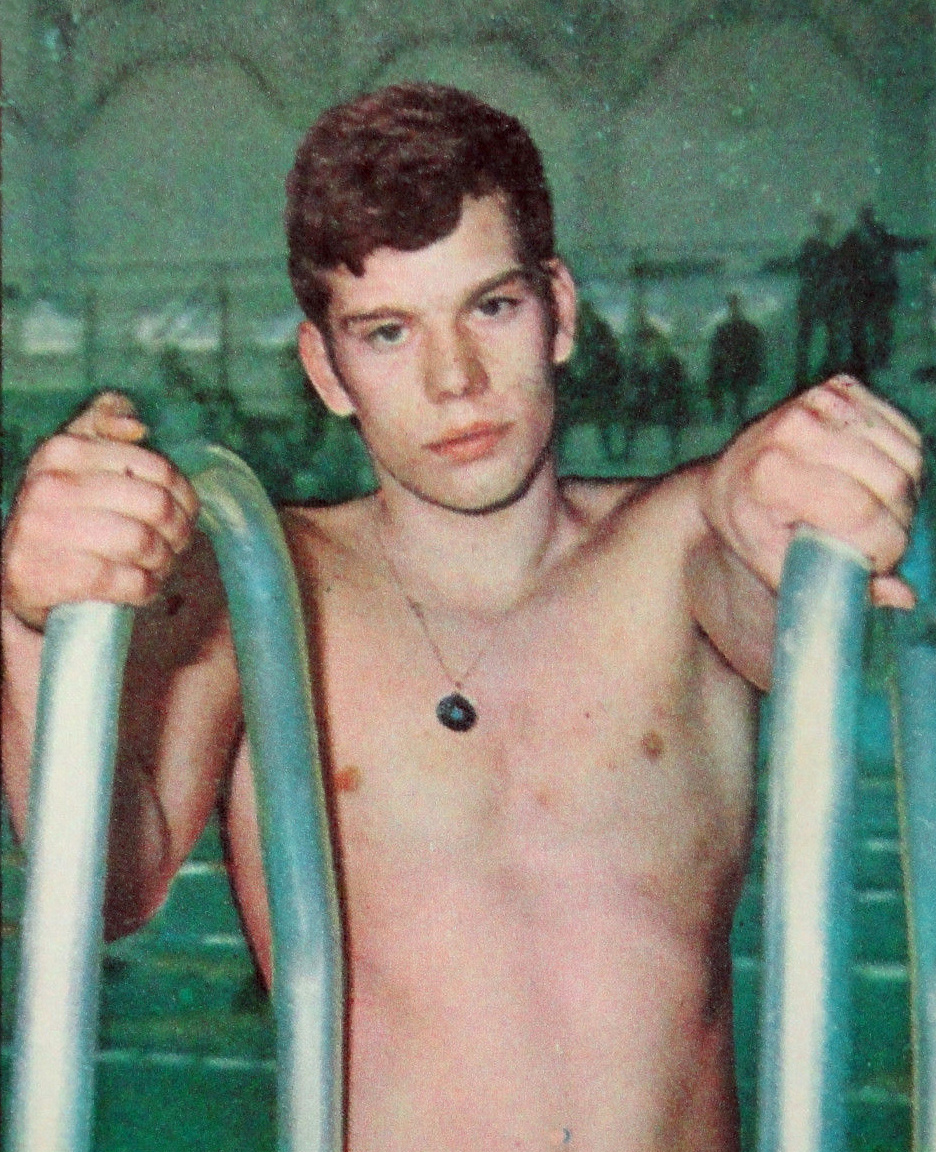
- Chino c. 1968

Personal information
- Born: 27 September 1948 (age 77) Padua, Italy
- Height: 1.77 m (5 ft 10 in)
- Weight: 73 kg (161 lb)

Sport
- Sport: Swimming

Franco Chino (born 27 September 1948) is a retired Italian backstroke swimmer. He competed in the 100 m and 200 m events at the 1968 Summer Olympics, but failed to reach the finals.
