= Bob Schoutsen =

Dutch swimmer (born 1951)

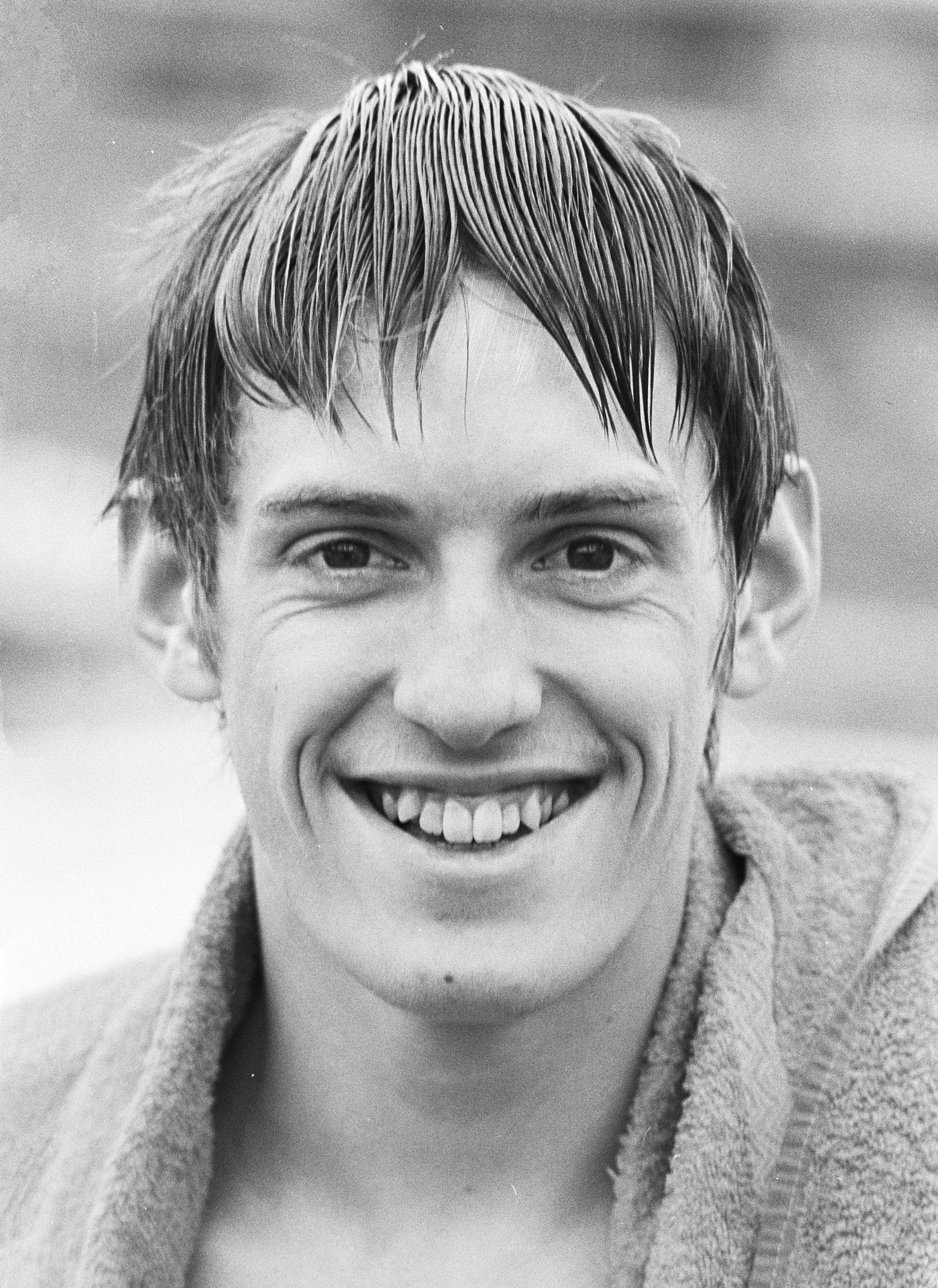
- Schoutsen in 1971

Personal information
- Born: 19 July 1951 (age 74) Amsterdam, the Netherlands
- Height: 1.85 m (6 ft 1 in)
- Weight: 77 kg (170 lb)

Sport
- Sport: Swimming
- Club: De Dolfijn, Amsterdam
Medal record
Representing the Netherlands
European Championships
Bronze medal – third place	1970 Barcelona	100 m backstroke

Bob Schoutsen (born 19 July 1951) is a retired backstroke swimmer from the Netherlands, who competed for his native country at the 1968 and 1972 Summer Olympics. His best individual result was sixth place in the 100 m backstroke (1:01.8) in 1968. He won a bronze medal in the same event at the 1970 European Aquatics Championships.

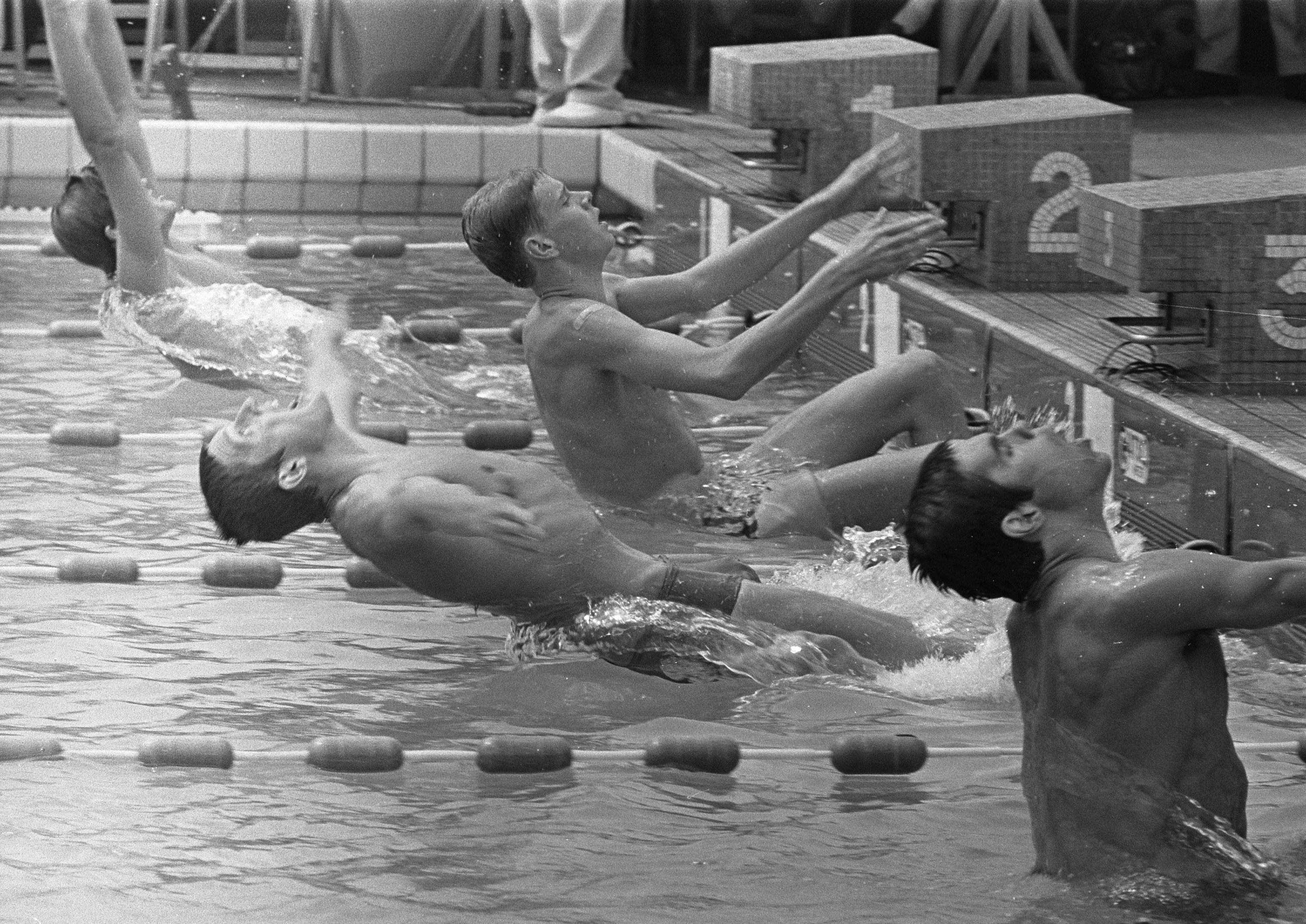
Start of 100 m backstroke at the 1969 Dutch championships. From bottom: Peter Schillemans, Bob Schoutsen, Wout Schouten and Jan Evert Veer
