= Doug Russell (swimmer) =

American swimmer (born 1946)

Personal information
- Full name: Douglas Albert Russell
- Nickname: "Doug"
- National team: United States
- Born: February 20, 1946 (age 80) New York, New York, U.S.
- Height: 6 ft 1 in (185 cm)
- Weight: 150 lb (68 kg)

Sport
- Sport: Swimming
- Strokes: Butterfly, backstroke, individual medley
- Club: Dick Smith Swim Gym
- College team: University of Texas at Arlington; Don Easterling (UT Arlington)
Medal record
Men's swimming
Representing the United States
Olympic Games
Gold medal – first place	1968 Mexico City	100 m butterfly
Gold medal – first place	1968 Mexico City	4x100 m medley
Pan American Games
Gold medal – first place	1967 Winnipeg	200 m medley
Gold medal – first place	1967 Winnipeg	4x100 m medley
Universiade
Gold medal – first place	1967 Tokyo	100 m butterfly
Gold medal – first place	1967 Tokyo	4x100 m medley
Silver medal – second place	1967 Tokyo	100 m backstroke

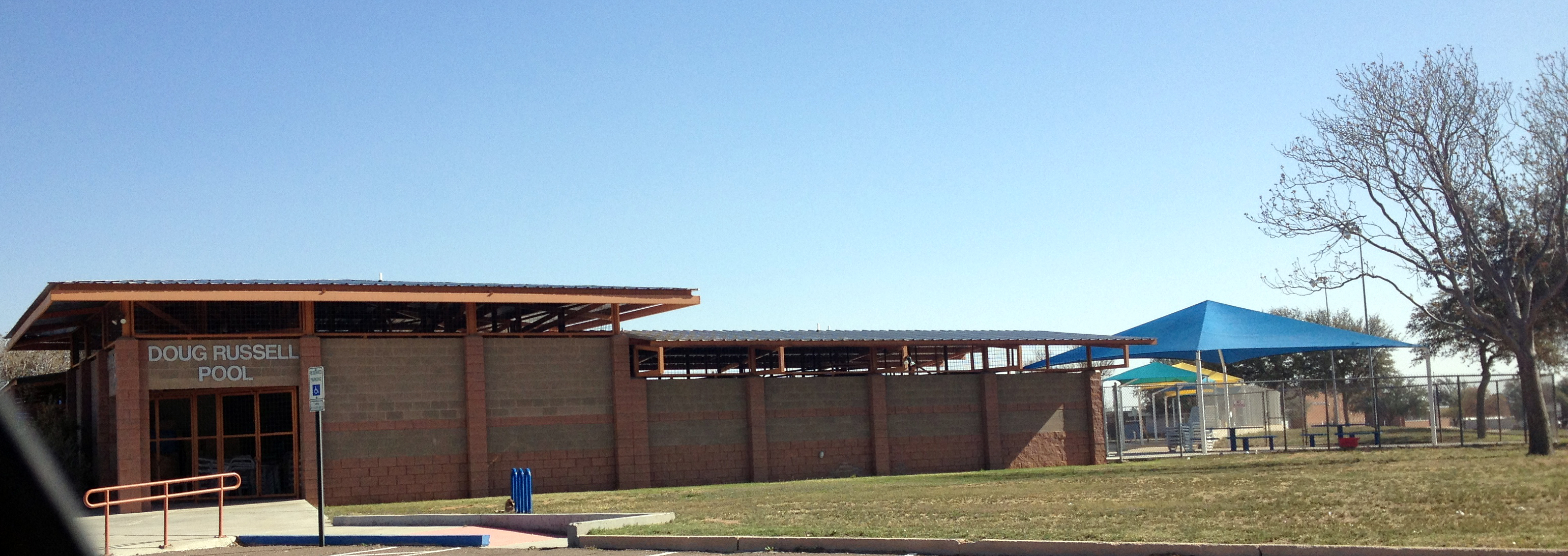
Doug Russell Pool in Midland, Texas

Douglas Albert Russell (born February 20, 1946) is an American former competitive swimmer, Olympic champion, and former world record-holder in three different events.

== Career ==
Russell was born in New York City, but raised in Midland, Texas. He swam for Midland High School, in the new 50-meter "Alamo" pool built by the city in 1962. It was later renamed in his honor: the "Douglas Russell Swimming Pool." He was an all-around swimmer in high school—swimming competitively in butterfly, backstroke, and individual medley events. Swimmers of his era remember him as a tough competitor who was hard to beat but brought out the best in those around him.

He attended The University of Texas at Arlington, where he swam for coach Don Easterling's UT Arlington Mavericks swimming and diving team in National Collegiate Athletic Association (NCAA) competition. He also swam for SMU Hall of Fame coach Red Barr, who coached the Pepsi Swim Club in Dallas and was an alternate coach for the 1968 Summer Olympics which Russell attended. Doug Russell Park, part of the southern edge of the UT Arlington campus, is named in his honor. At the 1967 Pan American Games, he won a gold medal in the 200-meter individual medley. He won an NCAA national championship in the 100-yard butterfly in 1968, and Amateur Athletic Union (AAU) national outdoor title in the 100-meter butterfly.

At the 1968 Summer Olympics, Russell won the first-ever gold medal awarded in the men's 100-meter butterfly—an event which made its debut at the 1968 Olympics–in an upset over teammate and favorite Mark Spitz. He won another gold medal swimming the butterfly leg for the winning U.S. team in the 4×100-meter medley relay. Russell, together with relay teammates Charlie Hickcox (backstroke), Don McKenzie (breaststroke), and Ken Walsh (freestyle), set a new world record of 3:54.9 in the event final.

Russell was inducted into the International Swimming Hall of Fame as an "Honor Swimmer" in 1985. He was the head coach of the Austin Trinity Aquatic Club until it was disbanded in 2020. He more recently coached at Trinity Aquatics in Spring Valley, California.

== See also ==
- List of Olympic medalists in swimming (men)
- List of University of Texas at Arlington people
- World record progression 100 metres backstroke
- World record progression 100 metres butterfly
- World record progression 4 × 100 metres medley relay

Records
Preceded by Thompson Mann	Men's 100-meter backstroke world record-holder (long course); August 28, 1967 – August 28, 1967	Succeeded by Charlie Hickcox
Preceded by Mark Spitz	Men's 100-meter butterfly world record-holder (long course); August 29, 1967 – October 7, 1967	Succeeded by Mark Spitz
