= Reinhard Blechert =

German swimmer

Personal information
- Born: 7 June 1947 (age 79) Böhlen, Germany

Sport
- Sport: Swimming

Reinhard Blechert (born 7 June 1947) is a German former swimmer. He competed in three events at the 1968 Summer Olympics.
