= Nikita (swimmer) =

Brazilian swimmer

Personal information
- Full name: João Reynaldo Costa Lima Neto
- Born: May 17, 1947 (age 79) Pernambuco, Brazil
- Height: 1.75 m (5 ft 9 in)
- Weight: 67 kg (148 lb)

Sport
- Sport: Swimming
- Strokes: Butterfly
Medal record
Pan American Games
Bronze medal – third place	1967 Winnipeg	4x100 m medley

João Reynaldo Costa Lima Neto (born May 17, 1947 in Pernambuco), known as Nikita, is a former international butterfly swimmer from Brazil.

At the 1967 Pan American Games, in Winnipeg, he won a bronze medal in the 4×100-metre medley.

At the 1968 Summer Olympics, in Mexico City, he swam the 100-metre butterfly and the 4×100-metre medley, not reaching the finals.
