= Jim Shaw (swimmer) =

Canadian swimmer

Personal information
- Born: 15 January 1950 (age 76) Toronto, Ontario, Canada

Sport
- Sport: Swimming
Medal record
Representing Canada
Pan American Games
Silver medal – second place	1967 Winnipeg	4x100m medley relay
Bronze medal – third place	1967 Winnipeg	100m backstroke

Jim Shaw (born 15 January 1950) is a Canadian former swimmer. He competed in three events at the 1968 Summer Olympics.
