= Gerald Evard =

Swiss swimmer

Personal information
- Born: 23 May 1948 (age 78) Concise, Switzerland

Sport
- Sport: Swimming

Gerald Evard (born 23 May 1948) is a Swiss former backstroke swimmer. He competed in three events at the 1968 Summer Olympics.
