= Antonio Attanasio =

Italian swimmer

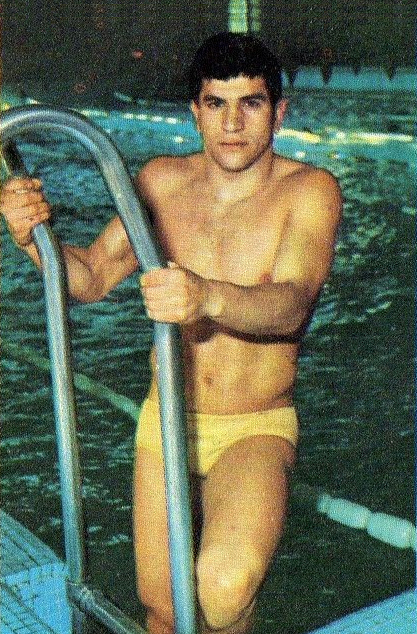

Personal information
- Born: 2 January 1950 Naples, Italy
- Died: 28 December 1982 (aged 32) Naples, Italy
- Height: 1.71 m (5 ft 7 in)
- Weight: 69 kg (152 lb)

Sport
- Sport: Swimming
- Club: Circolo Canottieri, Napoli

Antonio Attanasio (2 January 1950 – 28 December 1982) was an Italian swimmer. He competed in the 100 m butterfly and 4 × 100 m medley relay events at the 1968 Olympics, but failed to reach the finals. He died aged 32 in a traffic accident.
