= Franco Del Campo =

Italian swimmer and coach

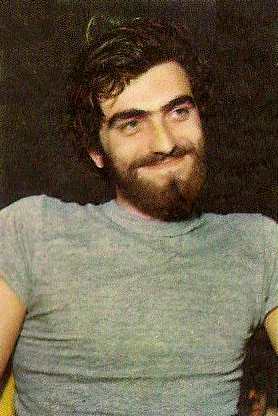

Personal information
- Born: 18 March 1949 (age 77) Trieste, Italy
- Height: 1.83 m (6 ft 0 in)
- Weight: 69 kg (152 lb)

Sport
- Sport: Swimming
Medal record
Men's swimming
Representing Italy
Mediterranean Games
Gold medal – first place	1967 Tunis	100 m backstroke
Gold medal – first place	1967 Tunis	4×100 m medley

Franco Del Campo (born 18 March 1949) is an Italian journalist, writer, professor and retired backstroke swimmer and coach. He competed at the 1968 Summer Olympics in the 100 m and 200 m backstroke and 4 × 100 m medley relay and reached the finals of the first two events.

After retiring from competitions, in the 1970s Del Campo worked as a swimming coach, and since 1978 as a freelance journalist with national newspapers. He later taught political communications at the University of Trieste and is currently professor of philosophy at Liceo Petrarca in Trieste.
