= Francisco Ramis =

Puerto Rican swimmer (born 1951)

Personal information
- Born: 13 June 1951 (age 75) Havana, Cuba

Sport
- Sport: Swimming

Francisco Ramis (born 13 June 1951) is a Puerto Rican former swimmer. He competed in five events at the 1968 Summer Olympics.
