= Gary Goodner =

Puerto Rican swimmer (1949–2022)

Personal information
- Born: 8 December 1949
- Died: 17 April 2022 (aged 72)

Sport
- Sport: Swimming
Medal record
Representing Puerto Rico
Central American and Caribbean Games
Gold medal – first place	1966 San Juan	4x100m freestyle relay
Gold medal – first place	1970 Panama City	100m freestyle
Gold medal – first place	1970 Panama City	100m butterfly
Gold medal – first place	1970 Panama City	4x100m freestyle relay

Gary Goodner (8 December 1949 – 17 April 2022) was a Puerto Rican former swimmer who competed in the 1968 Summer Olympics.
