= Open end =

Open end or Open-end may refer to:

- Open end (dominoes), a term used in the game of dominoes
- Open End (sculpture), an abstract public art sculpture by Clement Meadmore
- Open-end fund, a collective investment scheme that can issue and redeem shares at any time
- Open-end spinning, a technology for creating yarn without using a spindle
- Open-end wrench, a one-piece wrench with a U-shaped opening that grips two opposite faces of the bolt or nut

== Media ==
- Open End (1958–1966), the original title of the television series The David Susskind Show
- The open-endedness of such television programmes as Late Night Line-Up (1964-1972) and After Dark (1987-2003)
- Open End (2021), a German television discussion series hosted by Michel Friedman and broadcast by WELT

== See also ==
- Open-ended (disambiguation)
