= Closed-ended =

Closed-ended may refer to:

- Closed-end fund
- Closed-ended question

== See also ==
- Open-ended (disambiguation)
