= Double Up =

Double Up may refer to:

== Music ==
- Double Up (Mase album), 1999
- Double Up (R. Kelly album), 2007
  - "Double Up" (R. Kelly song), the title song, featuring Snoop Dogg
- "Double Up" (Nipsey Hussle song)

== Television ==
- Double Up (Canadian game show), a 1974 quiz show
- Double Up (American game show), a 1992 dating game show
- Pinoy Big Brother: Double Up, the 2009 third season of the Filipino reality TV series Pinoy Big Brother

== Other uses ==
- Double Up (sculpture), a public artwork, by Clement Meadmore, in Wisconsin, U.S.
- Generally refers to putting out a runner in baseball who had to tag up

== Other uses ==
- Double up, a roller coaster element
