= St. Francis Xavier Church (Cincinnati, Ohio) =

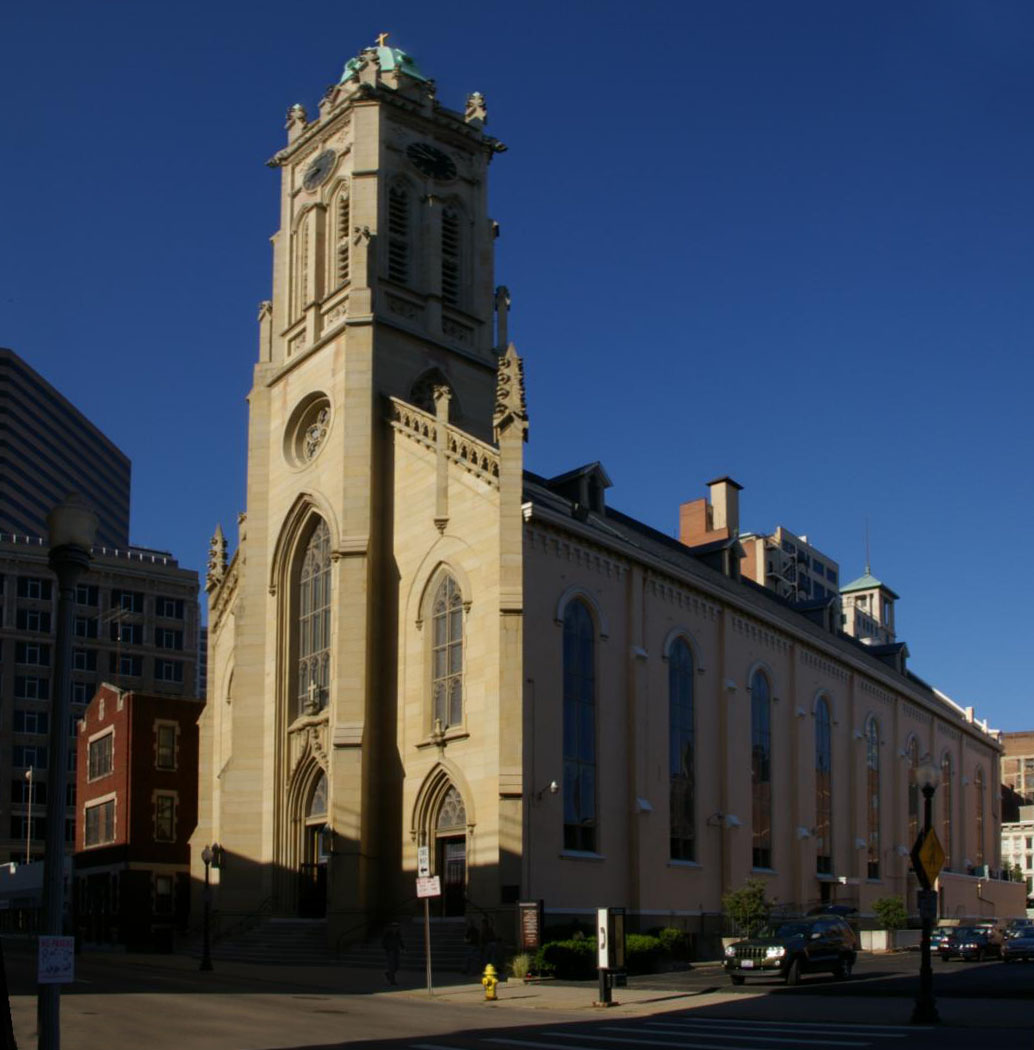
- Front and side of the church
- St. Francis Xavier Church
- Country: United States
- Denomination: Roman Catholic
- Website: www.stxchurch.org

History
- Status: Parish church
- Founded: 1819 (parish)

Architecture
- Functional status: Active
- Heritage designation: NRHP
- Years built: 1882-1887 (rebuilt/renovated)

Administration
- Province: Cincinnati (Region VI)
- Archdiocese: Cincinnati

Clergy
- Pastor(s): Rev. Paul Lickteig, SJ S.J.
- St. Francis Xavier Church
- U.S. National Register of Historic Places
- Cincinnati Local Historic Landmark
- Location within Ohio Location within the United States
- Location: 611 Sycamore St., Cincinnati, Ohio
- Coordinates: 39°6′12″N 84°30′33″W
- Area: 5 acres (2.0 ha)
- Built: 1860
- Architect: Lewis Pickett; Charles C. Svendsen
- Architectural style: Gothic Revival
- NRHP reference No.: 80003087
- Added to NRHP: July 18, 1980

St. Francis Xavier Church is a Catholic parish located at 611 Sycamore Street, Cincinnati, Ohio. This was the location of the first diocesan cathedral and the center of early Catholic life in the city. It was dedicated to St. Peter on December 17, 1826.

Christ Church, founded in 1819, the city's first Catholic church, was located at Vine and Liberty streets, in the "Northern Liberties" area, at the time outside of the city. A story that the church had to be built on the outskirts of the city because anti-Catholic prejudice prevented a Catholic church within city limits has been shown to be false by church historians. Its frame building was moved on wheels to Sycamore Street in 1826 to serve as the first seminary. Saint Francis Seraph Church now is on the former site, on land purchased from James Findlay.

St. Francis Xavier has existed as its own parish since 1845 when the cathedral was moved to Saint Peter In Chains Cathedral at Eight & Plum Streets. The parish has been under the direction of the Society of Jesus (Jesuits) since 1840. The present brick edifice with stone facing and ornate clock tower was built in 1860.

Xavier University and St. Xavier High School were founded next to the St. Xavier Church. Both institutions have since moved to separate locations due to space constraints and expansion. Today the church serves the downtown community.

== Gallery ==
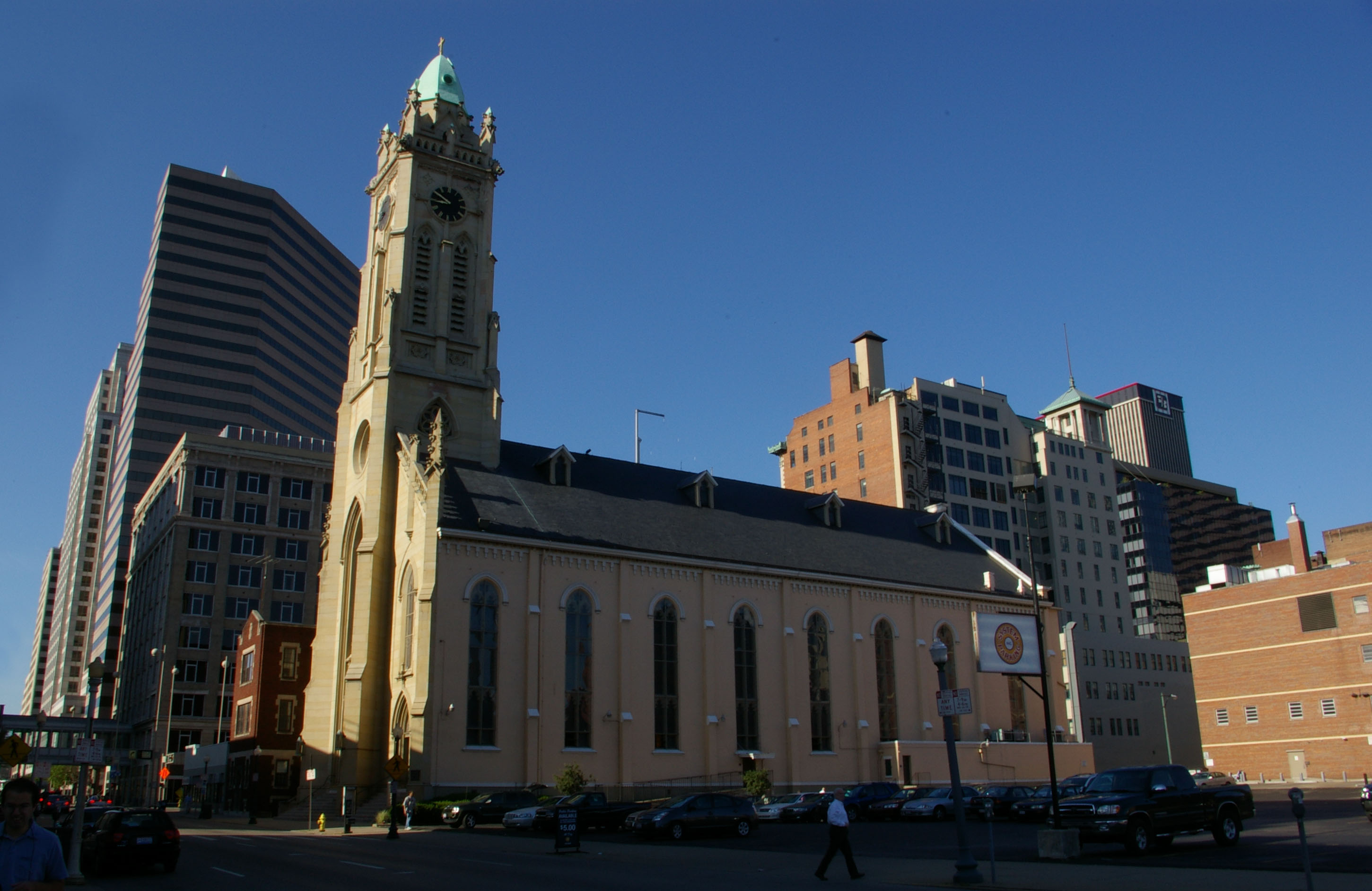
St. Francis Xavier Church

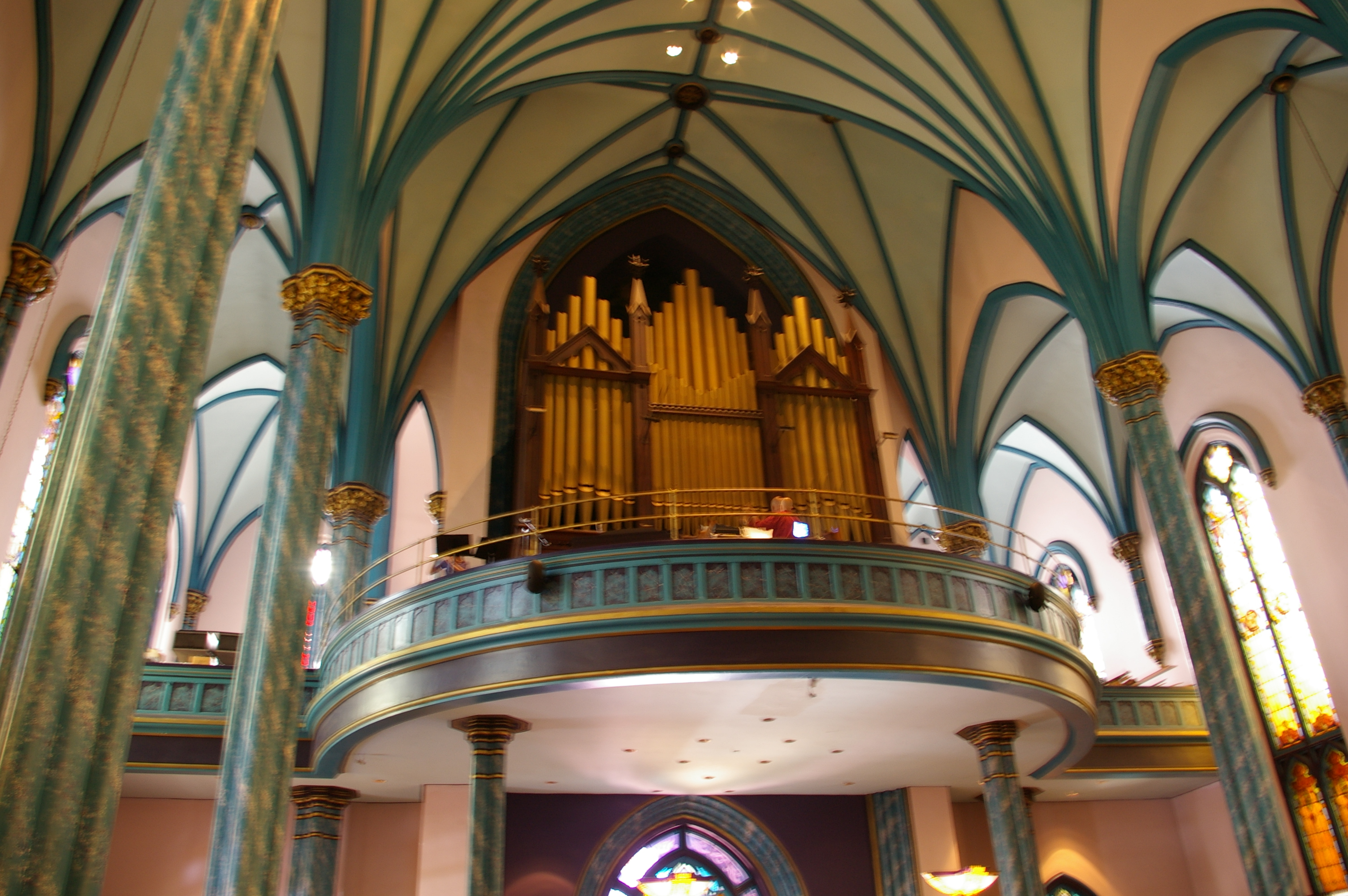
Organ

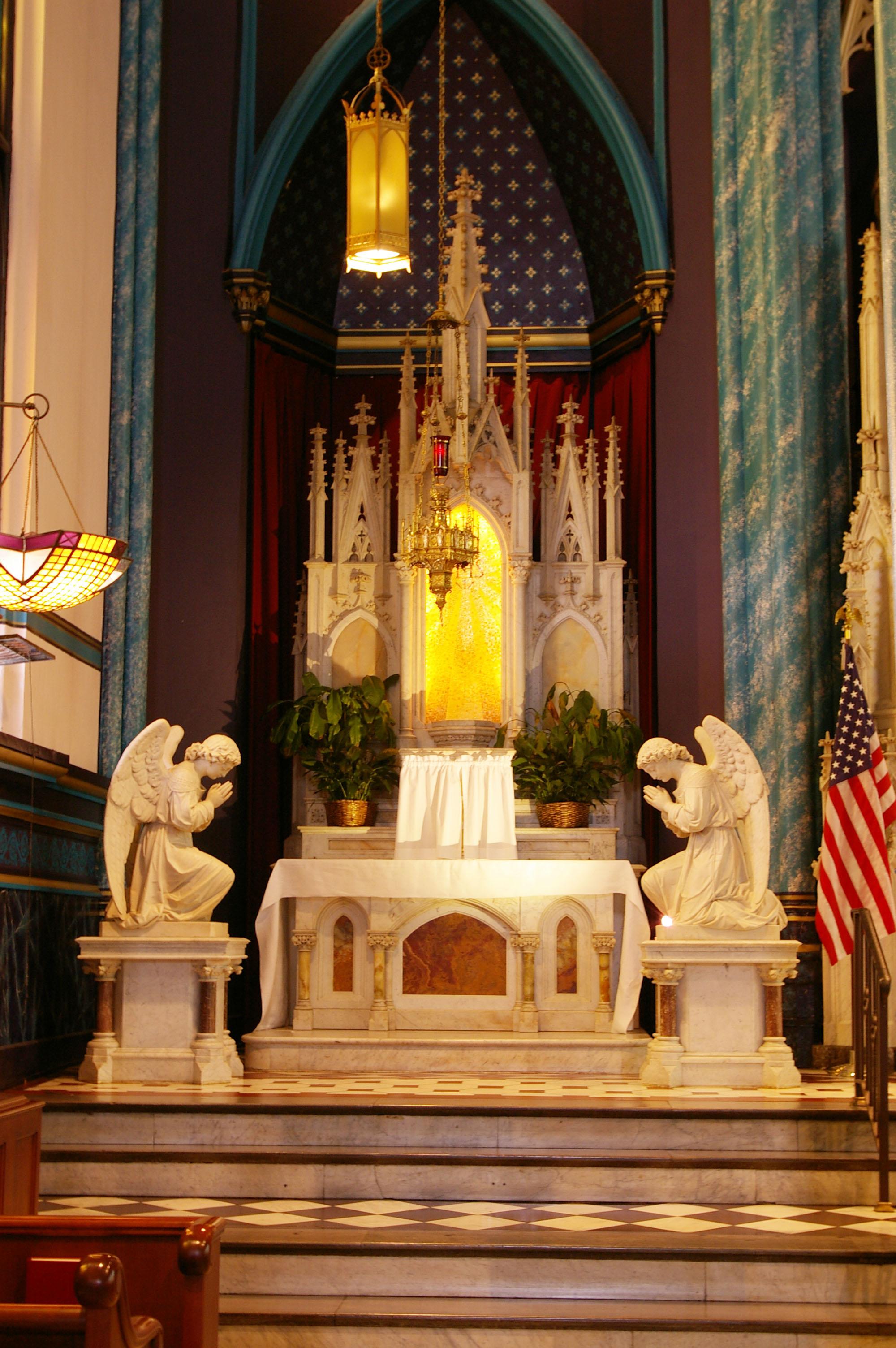
Side chapel of the Blessed Sacrament

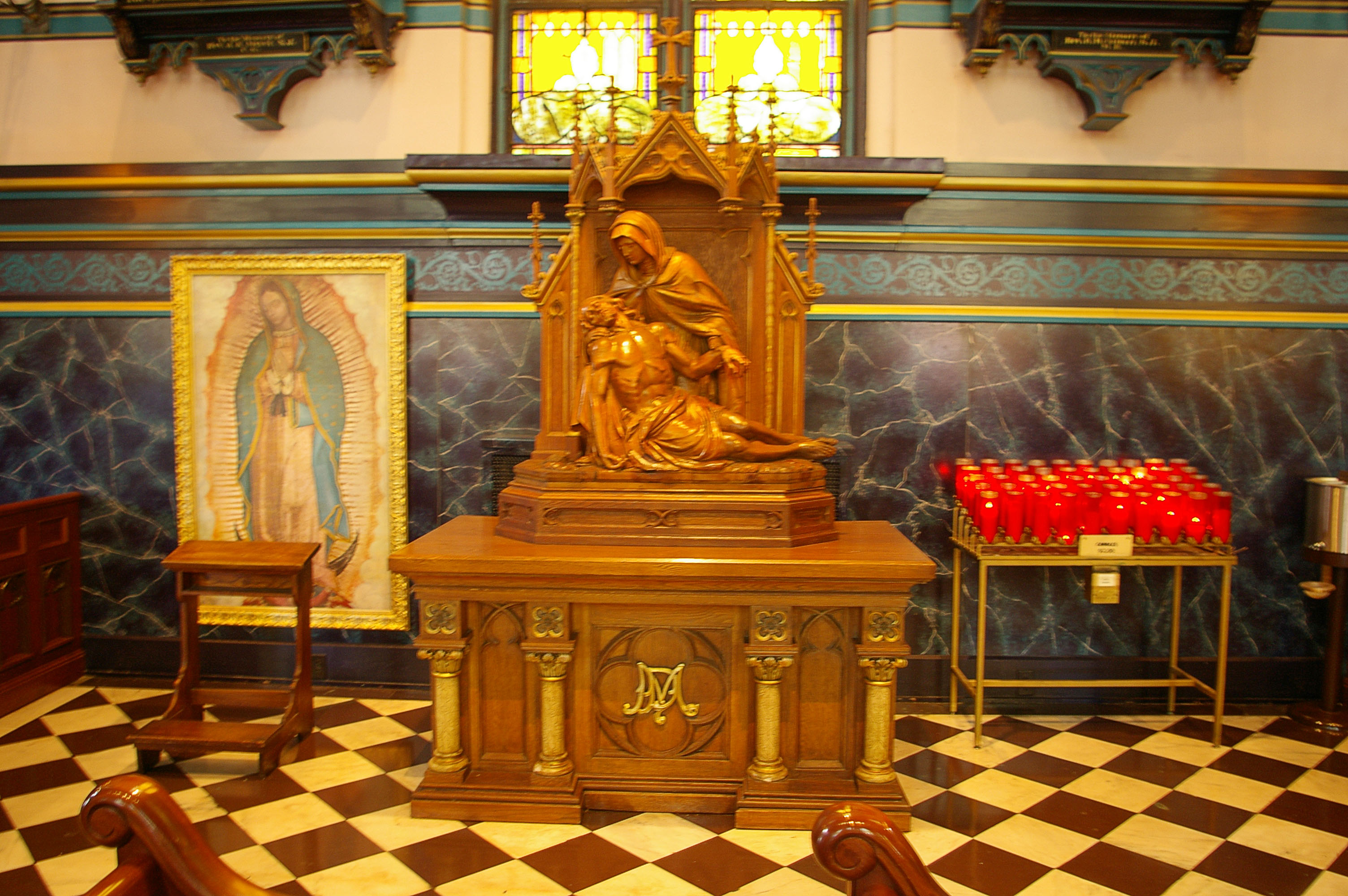
Wooden carving of the Pietà and image of Our Lady of Guadalupe

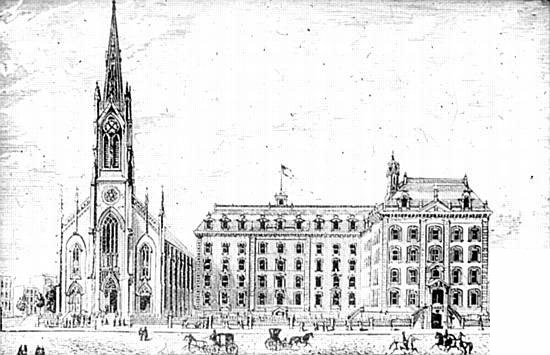
St. Xavier Church, High School, and College in 1831

== See also ==
- List of Jesuit sites
- St. Xavier Commercial School
