= St. Xavier High School (Ohio) =

- Academia Sancti Xaverii Cincinnatensis

Location
- 600 West North Bend Road; Cincinnati, Ohio 45224-1424; United States; 39°12′30″N 84°30′14″W

Information
- Type: Private, college preparatory
- Mottoes: Vidit Mirabilia Magna He has seen great wonders; Ad Majorem Dei Gloriam For the greater glory of God
- Denomination: Roman Catholic
- Patron saint: St. Francis Xavier
- Established: October 17, 1831; 195 years ago
- Founder: Bishop Edward D. Fenwick, O.P.
- School district: Roman Catholic Archdiocese of Cincinnati
- Authority: Society of Jesus (Midwest Province)
- CEEB code: 361–110
- NCES School ID: 01055649
- President: Tim Reilly (2018–present)
- Principal: Dan Lynch (July 2021–)
- Chaplain: Fr. Terry Baum, S.J.
- Faculty: 120 full-time teachers
- Grades: 9–12
- Gender: Male
- Enrollment: 1,415 (2025–26)
- Campus size: 110 acres (0.4 km^{2})
- Campus type: Suburban
- Colors: Royal blue and white
- Slogan: Men for Others, Magis
- Athletics conference: Greater Catholic League South
- Mascot: Benny the Bomber, Blue Monster
- Accreditation: AdvancED, Ohio Catholic School Accrediting Association
- Newspaper: The Blueprint
- Endowment: $107 million (2022)
- Tuition: $17,350 (2024-2025)
- Website: www.stxavier.org

St. Xavier High School (/ˈzeɪvjər/ ZAY-vyər; often abbreviated St. X) is a private, college-preparatory high school located just outside of Cincinnati, in the Finneytown neighborhood of Springfield Township, Hamilton County, Ohio. The independent, non-diocesan school is operated by the Midwest Province of the Society of Jesus as one of four all-male Catholic high schools in the Archdiocese of Cincinnati. Aside from colleges and universities, St. Xavier is the second-largest private school in Ohio and one of the 100 largest schools in the state, with 1,415 enrolled students as of the 2025–2026 school year.

St. Xavier is the oldest high school in the Cincinnati area and one of the oldest in the nation. It grew out of the Athenaeum, which opened in 1831 in downtown Cincinnati. From 1869 to 1934, the high school program formed the lower division of St. Xavier College, now Xavier University. The high school moved to its present location in 1960.

== History ==
=== Downtown origins ===
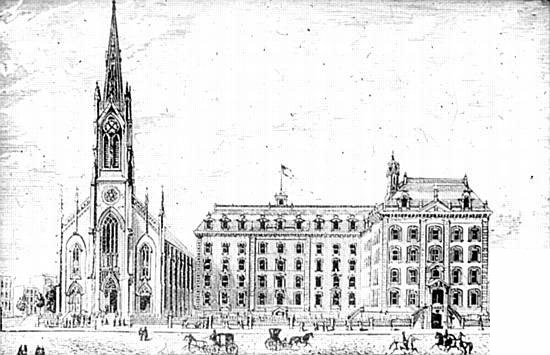
St. Xavier High School, 1860, in the enlarged Second Empire buildings by Anton and Louis Piket, which replaced the much smaller Athenaeum buildings of c. 1831. St. Francis Xavier Church, to the left, was altered by Samuel Hannaford & Sons to its present state after a fire in 1882.

St. Xavier, once a part of Xavier University, traces its history to the Athenaeum at Seventh and Sycamore streets in Downtown Cincinnati. The institute, which included a seminary and lay college, was dedicated by the first bishop of Cincinnati, the Most Rev. Edward D. Fenwick, O.P., on October 17, 1831. It was the first Catholic institution of higher learning in the Northwest Territory. Just a week later, the city's first public high school, Woodward College, opened its doors. The Athenaeum stood until 1890, next door to The Catholic Telegraph's printing press.

In 1840, at the behest of Bishop Fenwick, the Society of Jesus began operating the Athenaeum's lay college, which it renamed St. Xavier College, after St. Francis Xavier. The Congregation of the Mission (Vincentians) took over the seminary in 1841, and the college was granted a 30-year state charter in 1842. St. Xavier College originally offered six years of integrated primary, secondary, and post-secondary education, in keeping with the Ratio Studiorum and the original Jesuit college in Messina, Sicily, predecessor to the University of Messina. Day schoolers came from all over the city, while boarders hailed from the Deep South, Mexico, and Cuba. School closed on Thursdays and Sundays until 1917. Originally, until 1851, admission was granted to students ages 8 to 16. Later, a tuition-free elementary school division opened to complement the college. In 1844, the school's elementary division opened a boarding school campus in Walnut Hills but was forced to close its doors two years later and return downtown.

In the 1850s, falling enrollment, threat of bankruptcy, and cholera brought about proposals to close the high school division. Jesuit schools had opened in the South, contributing to declining enrollment. The situation was worsened by the local anti-Catholic and Know Nothing sentiment that culminated in the Cincinnati riot of 1853. Beginning the fall of 1854, St. Xavier stopped admitting boarders altogether, becoming a primarily local institute, to reduce the financial burden on its students' families.

On May 7, 1869, St. Xavier's charter was extended in perpetuity by an act of the General Assembly. Later that year, the school began distinguishing between academic and collegiate departments. Three years of high school would be followed by one year each of the humanities, poetry, rhetoric, and philosophy.

At the close of the 19th century, St. Xavier's athletic teams competed in the Interscholastic Athletic Association of Cincinnati.

=== Expansion and separation ===
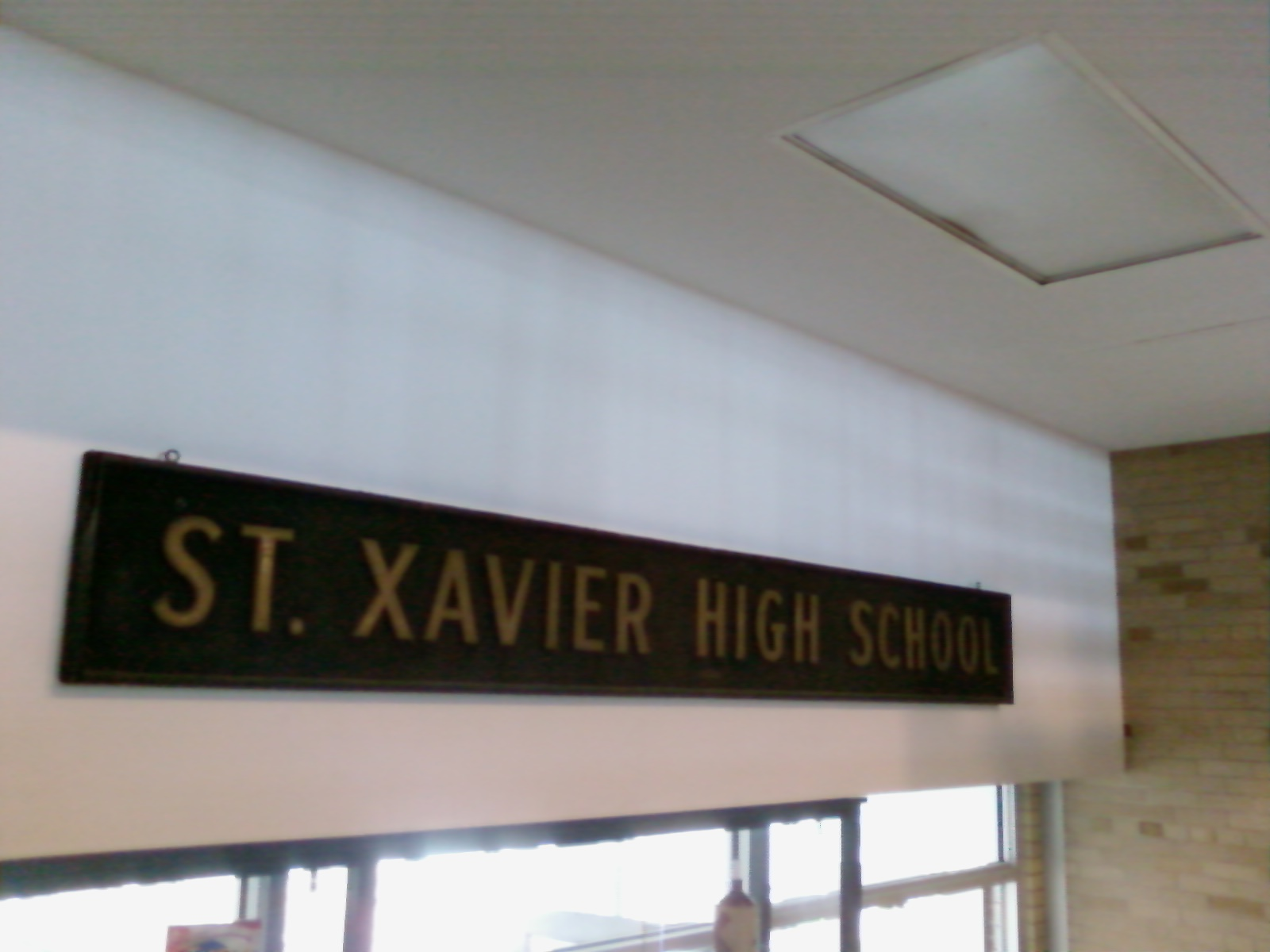
A former entrance sign now hangs in the main stairwell. It made its first appearance downtown on August 28, 1919.

The seals of St. Xavier and Xavier University (shown here) originate from the seal that St. Xavier College adopted in 1928.

In 1910, St. Xavier College transitioned to an American-style eight-year program. Some students took typing classes at the St. Xavier Commercial School nearby. On October 1, 1906, another branch campus opened in Walnut Hills. This time, St. Xavier Branch High School or "St. Xavier on the Hill" served first- and second-year high school students. Tuition was $60 downtown and $80 at the suburban location (equivalent to $2,150 and $2,867, respectively, in 2025). Classes were held in Walnut Hills until December 1911.

In 1912, the Branch High School moved into the Avondale Athletic Club in North Avondale and became Xavier Academy. On September 10, 1919, Xavier Academy closed as the College of Arts and Sciences moved into its campus. However, science classes remained at the high school downtown, for the time being, as did the evening classes from the Schools of Law, Commerce, and Sociology.

In the late 1920s, St. Xavier High School began competing against Elder, Purcell, and Roger Bacon high schools in baseball, basketball, and football. On October 6, 1931, the four schools founded the Greater Cincinnati League, known today as the Greater Catholic League.

On August 4, 1930, the college became Xavier University, to reflect its transition to the American university model and garner more prestige ahead of its centennial the next year. St. Xavier High School formally split with St. Xavier College in 1934, with Fr. Aloysius J. Diersen, S.J., serving as the High School's first president, but the two schools continued to share resources. Xavier's School of Education conducted practice teaching at St. Xavier. Also, St. Xavier's senior classes studied under Xavier professors in Avondale from 1944 to 1946, to compensate for Xavier's loss of cadets from the Army Air Corps 30th College Training Detachment during World War II.

=== Finneytown relocation and recent history ===
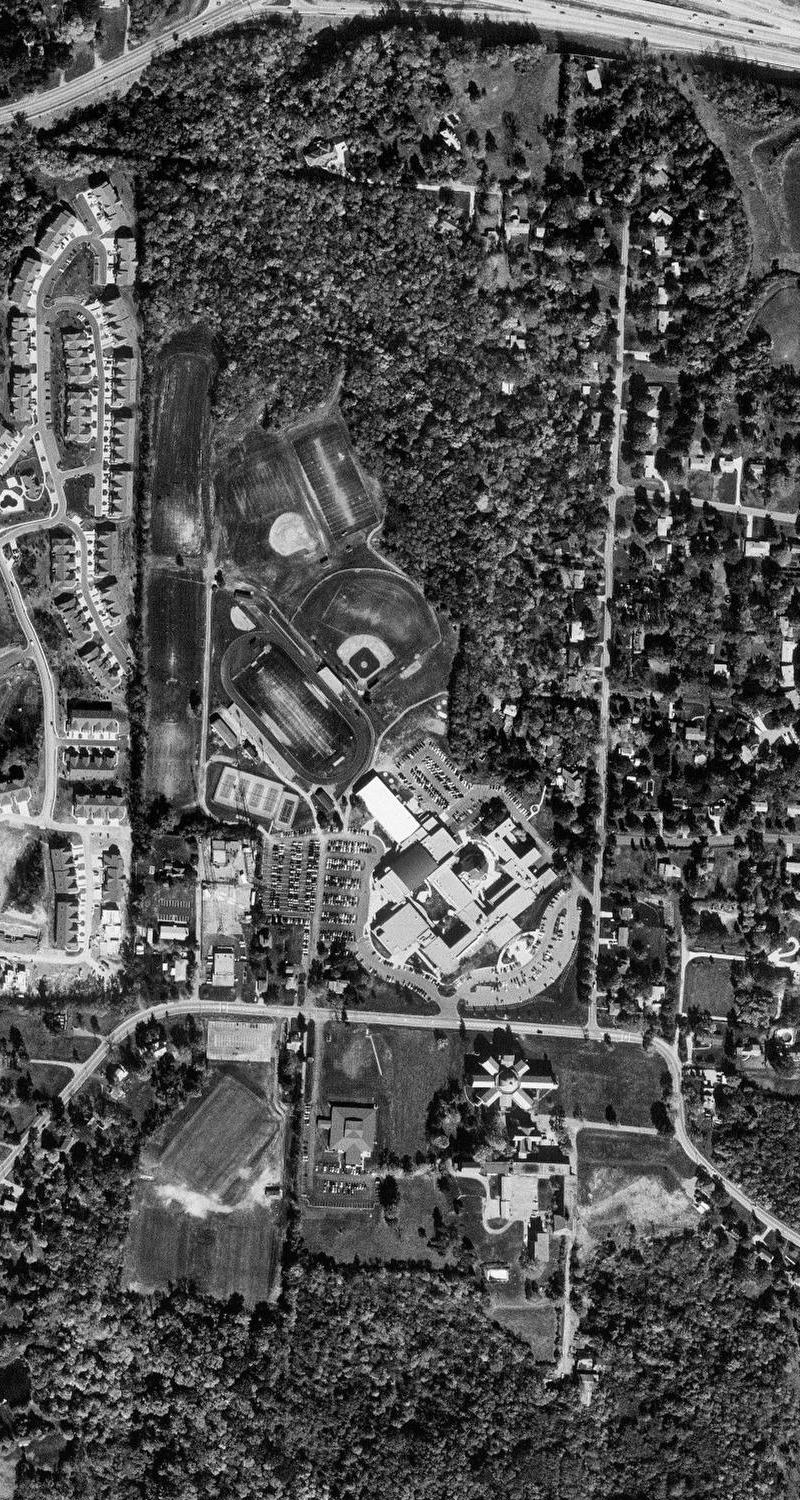
2000

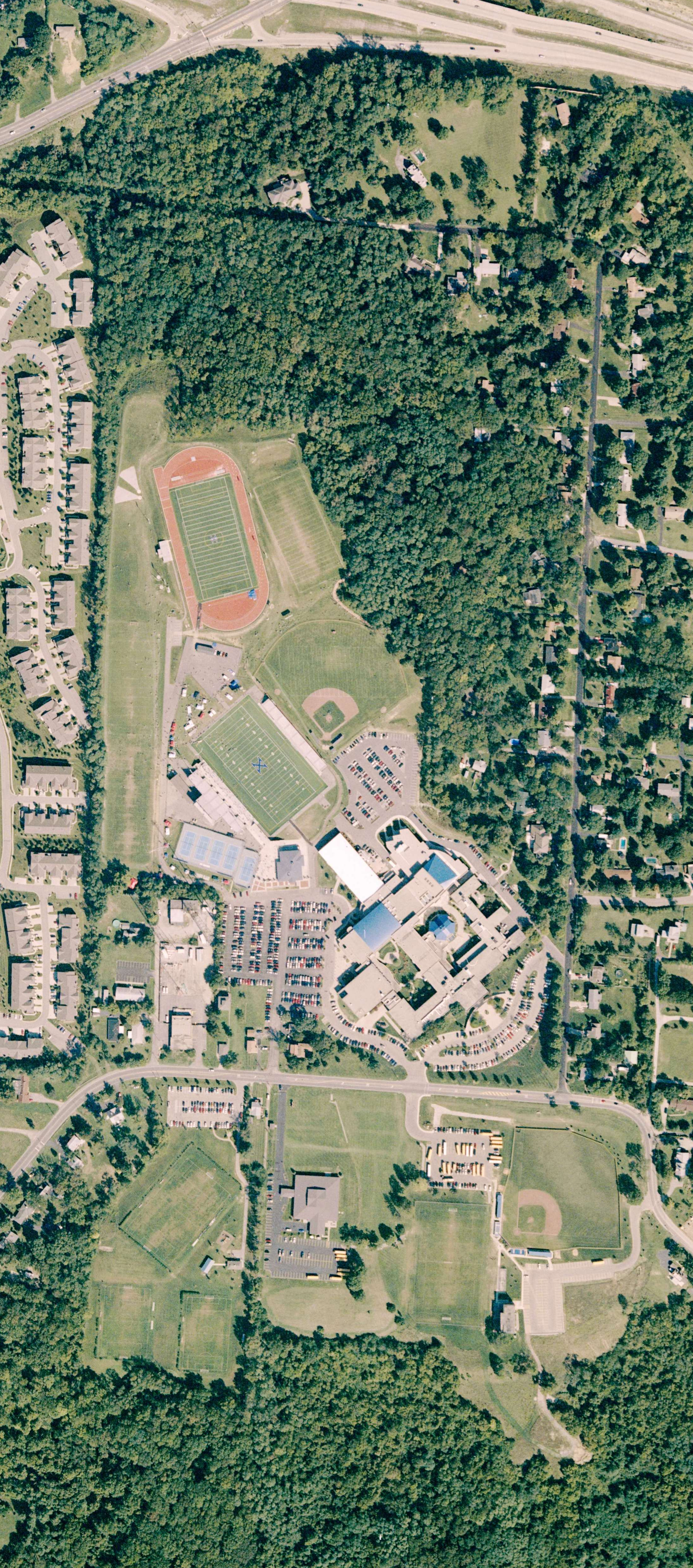
2005

The school campus, before and after its expansion onto the former Girls' Town site

St. Xavier began its move from the original location in downtown Cincinnati in April 1955 when its president, Fr. John J. Benson, S.J., purchased a 62-acre (0.25 km^{2}) plot in Finneytown. In September 1960, St. Xavier High School moved into its newly built facilities, designed by local architect Albert Walters, in unincorporated Springfield Township. At the time, the facilities were nicknamed the "Finneytown Hilton" for their price tag of over $4 million (equivalent to $33.3 million in 2025). The original high school building was later torn down and is now the site of a parking lot.

In 1965, St. Xavier produced its first three African-American graduates, Phil Cox, Michael Walker, and Peter D. Samples. The same school year, Myron Kilgore was hired as the school's first African-American faculty member.

Since its move away from downtown, St. Xavier has expanded its facilities dramatically. In 1969, the school added Keating Natatorium, which featured a $500,000 Olympic-size swimming pool (equivalent to $3.36 million in 2025). St. Xavier's worship space was replaced by Xavier Hall, a multipurpose facility, in 1986. In 1998, a $12.6 million expansion project moved science classes from the basement into a new, three-story wing and added the Holy Companions Chapel and a dedicated intramural gym. During the 2003–04 school year, St. Xavier renovated the football stadium around Ballaban Field, which was built in the late 1960s, and renamed it Ballaban Field at St. Xavier Stadium. Along with the stadium, the school opened a 500-seat theater space, as well as a black box theater, art studios, and renovated music rooms. A new track field replaced the track that once surrounded Ballaban Field. St. Xavier also converted the former Girls' Town of America location across the street into its "South Campus", which includes new baseball and soccer fields. The school added a makerspace in the fall of 2017.

On December 15, 2017, St. Xavier named its first lay president, Tim Reilly, who succeeded Fr. Tim A. Howe, S.J., in July 2018. Until then, all of St. Xavier's presidents had been ordained members of the Society of Jesus.

In 2018, two priests affiliated with St. Xavier during the mid-1960s were named in the Midwest Jesuits' list of clergy members accused of sexual abuse. In 2020, the school removed a chaplain upon receiving allegations of abuse by him during the 1990s.

During the COVID-19 pandemic, St. Xavier returned to in-person learning as soon as the stay-at-home order was lifted. The school credited this policy with increased enrollment.

In March 2021, RDI Corporation, a Blue Ash–based outsourcing firm, gave the school $1 million to endow its football program. In recognition, St. Xavier Stadium was renamed RDI Stadium. In August 2021, Keating Natatorium reopened after a $5.5 million renovation.

In 2022, the Midwest Jesuits established Xavier Jesuit Academy at a former parochial school in Bond Hill to serve underprivileged students in the third through eighth grades. Its opening on August 14, 2024, marked the first time the Jesuits provided elementary school education in Cincinnati since St. Xavier Elementary School in the 1850s.

== Academics ==
As of 2025, St. Xavier has 1,415 enrolled students, the most of any Catholic high school in an area with the nation's second-highest private school attendance rate. Tuition is US$17,350.00 for the 2025-26 school year. According to St. Xavier, tuition is $1,000 less than the cost of educating a student there. During the 2025-26 school year, 77% of students received financial aid, awarding $5.8 million in financial assistance. St. Xavier accepts school vouchers from the Ohio Educational Choice Scholarship Program (EdChoice).

The faculty consists of 120 full-time teachers, including six Jesuit priests. Eighty six percent of the faculty have a master's degree or higher. Four full-time staff members assist with Individualized Education Programs.

=== Admissions and demographics ===
Students apply to St. Xavier High School by taking the High School Placement Test (HSPT) and submitting an elementary school transcript, teacher recommendations, and an enrollment application. Other factors are also taken into account. As of 2017, approximately 56% of freshman applicants are admitted, down from 70% in 2014. About a quarter of these students are admitted due to legacy, defined as an alumnus or current student in the applicant's immediate family.

Students come to St. Xavier from throughout Greater Cincinnati, Southeastern Indiana, and Northern Kentucky. As of 2025, students of color make up 21% of the student body, up from 12% in 2015. About 80% are Roman Catholic.

In addition to students from the Greater Cincinnati area, St. Xavier admits students from overseas through various foreign exchange programs, such as American Field Service. In particular, partner school Col·legi Casp–Sagrat Cor de Jesús in Barcelona has sent students to St. Xavier and received them into its batxillerat (baccalaureate) program since 1995.

=== Curriculum and scheduling ===
All students at St. Xavier are part of the school's college preparatory program, requiring 23½ credit units for graduation. The program is accredited by AdvancED, the Ohio Catholic School Accrediting Association, and the Ohio Department of Education. Students are not ranked. Grade point averages are computed on an unweighted 100-point scale, which can be converted to a standard 4.0 scale.

The college preparatory program encompasses a variety of subject areas as part of an emphasis on cura personalis ("well-rounded individuals"). As of 2025, the school offers 29 electives aligned with Advanced Placement curricula:

- Biology
- Calculus AB
- Calculus BC
- Chemistry
- Chinese Language and Culture
- Computer Science A
- Computer Science Principles
- English Language and Composition
- English Literature and Composition
- Environmental Science
- European History
- French Language and Culture
- German Language and Culture
- Human Geography
- Latin
- Macroeconomics
- Microeconomics
- Music Theory
- Physics 1
- Physics C: Electricity and Magnetism
- Physics C: Mechanics
- Psychology
- Spanish Language and Culture
- Statistics
- Studio Art 2D
- Studio Art Drawing
- U.S. Government and Politics
- U.S. History
- World History

As a Roman Catholic school, St. Xavier requires all students to study various aspects of religion and theology each year.

St. Xavier students may receive credit for work completed at the school's partners, Canisius-Kolleg Berlin and Xavier University. During the summers of even-numbered years, a Marine Science elective is offered to St. Xavier students at Hawaii Preparatory Academy in Waimea, Hawaii County, Hawaii. In partnership with the Confucius Institute at Miami University, St. Xavier opened the region's first Confucius Classroom in 2016 to support its Chinese language program.

Freshmen are organized into five houses for the purposes of academic scheduling and guidance counseling.

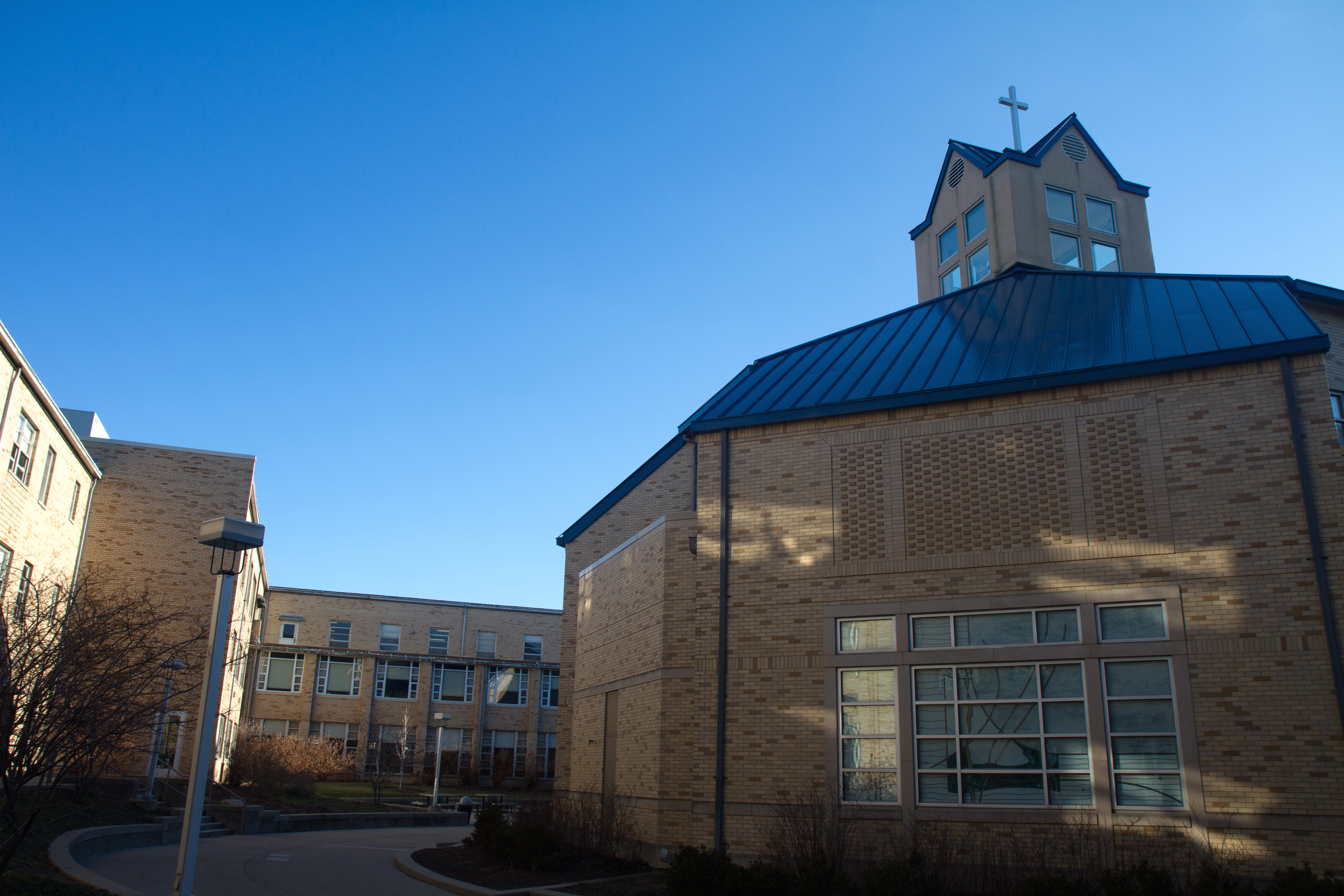
Daily Mass is offered every morning at the Holy Companions Chapel.

The school year begins in August and ends in May. It is divided into two semesters for grading and course scheduling purposes, but exams are administered quarterly. An ordinary school day begins at 8:00 am and ends at 3:05 pm. The school day is divided into eight periods. Although students register for 6–7 classes in a quarter, only six meet on any given day. Classes are not assigned to a specific period; instead, they rotate in a round-robin schedule designed to reduce stress. Additionally, two days dubbed "X and Y days" are often set aside for block scheduling, to allow for classroom material that would not otherwise fit into a normal-length class period. An iOS application named XSchedule is available for keeping track of the current day's schedule.

From 2011 to 2017, St. Xavier students were permitted to use personal laptops, tablets, and smartphones at school under a voluntary bring your own device policy. Beginning with the class of 2018, St. Xavier phased in a one to one computing policy in which students are required to own an iPad for use at school. However, beginning with the class of 2021, the school has reverted to a bring your own laptop policy that excludes Apple devices, including the iPad.

=== Recognition and graduation ===
Each year, a number of St. Xavier students receive honors from standardized testing programs. From 1970 to 2012, 1,000 students were named semifinalists or finalists in the National Merit Scholarship Program. In 2018, 16 seniors were commended and 17 were named finalists in the program. The same year, 603 students took 1,076 Advanced Placement exams. For their high scores, 91 earned Scholar Awards, 46 with honor, 80 with distinction, and of them seven were named National AP Scholars, the highest distinction awarded. In 2006, a record 137 students received Scholar Awards. The class of 2018 posted an average ACT score of 29.2, the highest in the school's history, with five perfect scores. Nine students in the class of 2019 posted a perfect score. The class of 2021 posted an average ACT score of 28.6 and an average SAT score of 1324, earning 14 students National Merit Finalist status. That year, 550 students took 998 Advanced Placement exams. For their high scores, 77 earned Scholar Awards, 34 with honor, 127 with distinction, the highest distinction awarded after the National AP Scholar award was discontinued in 2020.

The U.S. Department of Education recognized the school itself as a Blue Ribbon School for the 1983–84 and 1984–85 school years. In 1984, St. Xavier was one of 60 schools recognized by the Council on American Private Education's Exemplary Private School Recognition Project, which surveyed 358 schools nationwide.

Graduation exercises are held at the Cintas Center in late May. On average, about six percent of students in a given class year leave St. Xavier before graduation. Of those who graduate, 99% enter a four-year college or university and 82% are admitted into their first choice school. The University of Cincinnati, Ohio State University, and Miami University received the most students from the classes of 2008–2012. The class of 2018 has matriculated into 82 colleges and universities. According to BusinessWeek, nearly a third of the Class of 2004 pursued a major in business. In 2007, St. Xavier published a directory of over 16,000 living alumni, listing "511 living graduates as medical doctors or dentists, 624 as attorneys, and 610 as engineers".

== School traditions ==
As a member of the Jesuit Schools Network, St. Xavier shares many Jesuit traditions with other secondary institutions run by the Society of Jesus. For example, graduating students are expected to have acquired the five characteristics defined in the "Graduate at Graduation" profile: Open to Growth, Intellectually Competent, Religious, Loving, and Committed to Justice.

The school holds school-wide Masses on holy days of obligation and other important events, as well as optional daily Mass in Holy Companions Chapel at the center of campus.

Ignatian retreats are offered frequently at St. Xavier. Besides class-wide programs held at the Jesuit Spiritual Center in Milford, optional retreats include Knightwatch for sophomores and Kairos, which was introduced in February 1985 for seniors.

=== Alma mater ===
St. Xavier's alma mater is adapted from that of another Jesuit high school, St. Ignatius High School in Cleveland; in 1958, St. Ignatius gave St. Xavier permission to adapt the song. St. Xavier modified the final two lines, which refer to the school name and colors. This adaptation is sung after school assemblies, athletic events, and commencement exercises.

Our famed Alma Mater graces

Every shrine within our hearts,

with her unforgotten faces

and the faith that she imparts.

Years in passing cannot sever

ties of old days from the new.

We are Xavier men forever…

As we hail the white and blue!

=== Fundraising ===
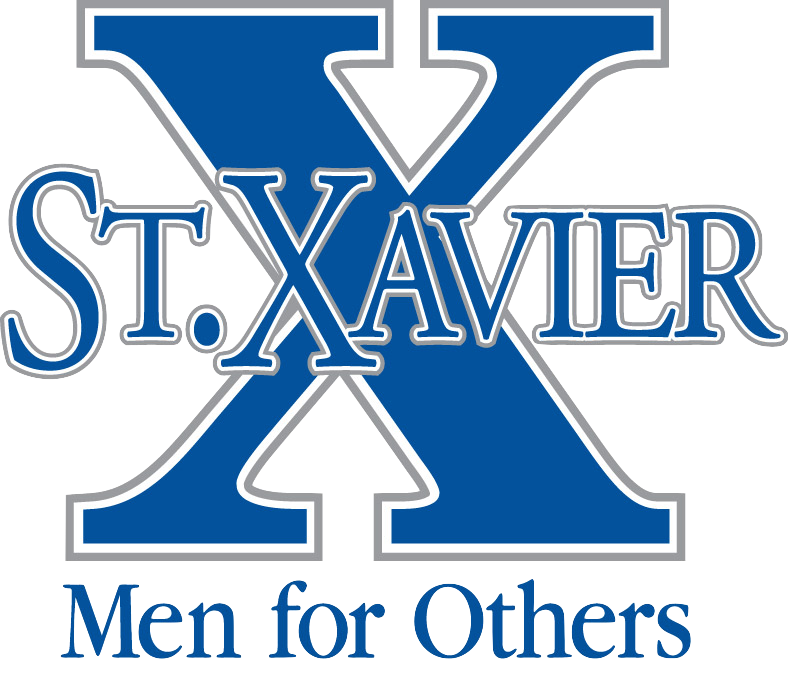
The St. Xavier license plate features the school's logo.

St. Xavier's financial aid program benefits from a pair of annual fundraisers, each held annually since 1973. The Walk For X is a 10-kilometer (6.2 mi) student walkathon through Finneytown neighborhoods that preempts classes once a year. The X-Travaganza is a themed dinner auction modeled after that of Loyola Academy in Chicago.

In 2018, the 132nd Ohio General Assembly authorized the Bureau of Motor Vehicles to issue a specialty license plate bearing St. Xavier's logo and the words "The Long Blue Line", referring to the school's alumni. Proceeds from registration fees benefit the school's tuition assistance and guidance counseling programs.

== Campus ==
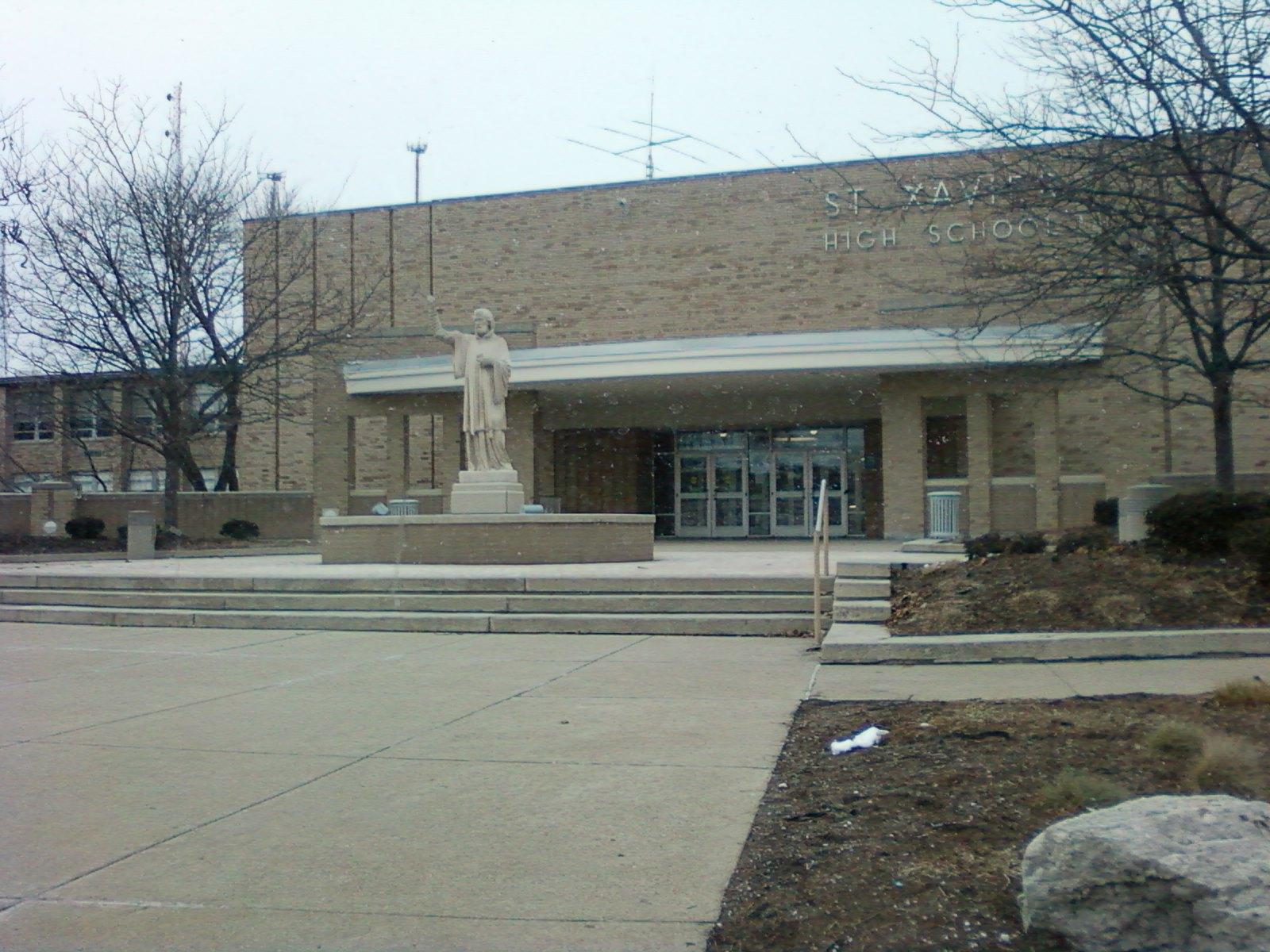
The front entrance to St. Xavier was renovated in 1998.

St. Xavier's 110-acre (0.4 km^{2}) suburban campus is located to the north and south of West North Bend Road, bounded by the Cincinnati College of Mortuary Science to the south, Ronald Reagan Cross County Highway to the north, and residential areas to the east and west.

The school grounds include a wooded walking trail, a mock courtroom, and a school history exhibit. The Fred Middendorf, S.J., Nature Trail runs about one-third of a mile (0.54 km) behind the athletic fields. Indoors, the Mock Trial team makes use of a specially built classroom that imitates the layout of a courtroom. Along the school's main hallways, recent student artwork hangs beside the Living Walls project, a graphical timeline accompanying 90 years of class photos. St. Xavier maintains 11 computer labs with over 330 computers available for student use. The school library, named for alumnus and Ohio state representative John D. "Jay" Carroll III, contains 23,000 volumes. A makerspace in the Fine Arts wing offers student access to single-board microcontrollers, CNC machines, 3D printers, and large-format printers.

St. Xavier's Finneytown campus features athletic facilities comparable to most colleges, including a new football stadium and indoor swimming pool which it shares with the Cincinnati Marlins. The olympic-size swimming pool seats 626. The school has one of the largest tennis court complexes in the area. St. Xavier's soccer field was home to the now-defunct Cincinnati Cheetahs professional soccer team during their 1994 season.

The school's most prominent art installation is the sculpture Open End, a 1983 work by Australian sculptor Clement Meadmore.

== Extracurricular activities ==
=== Athletics ===
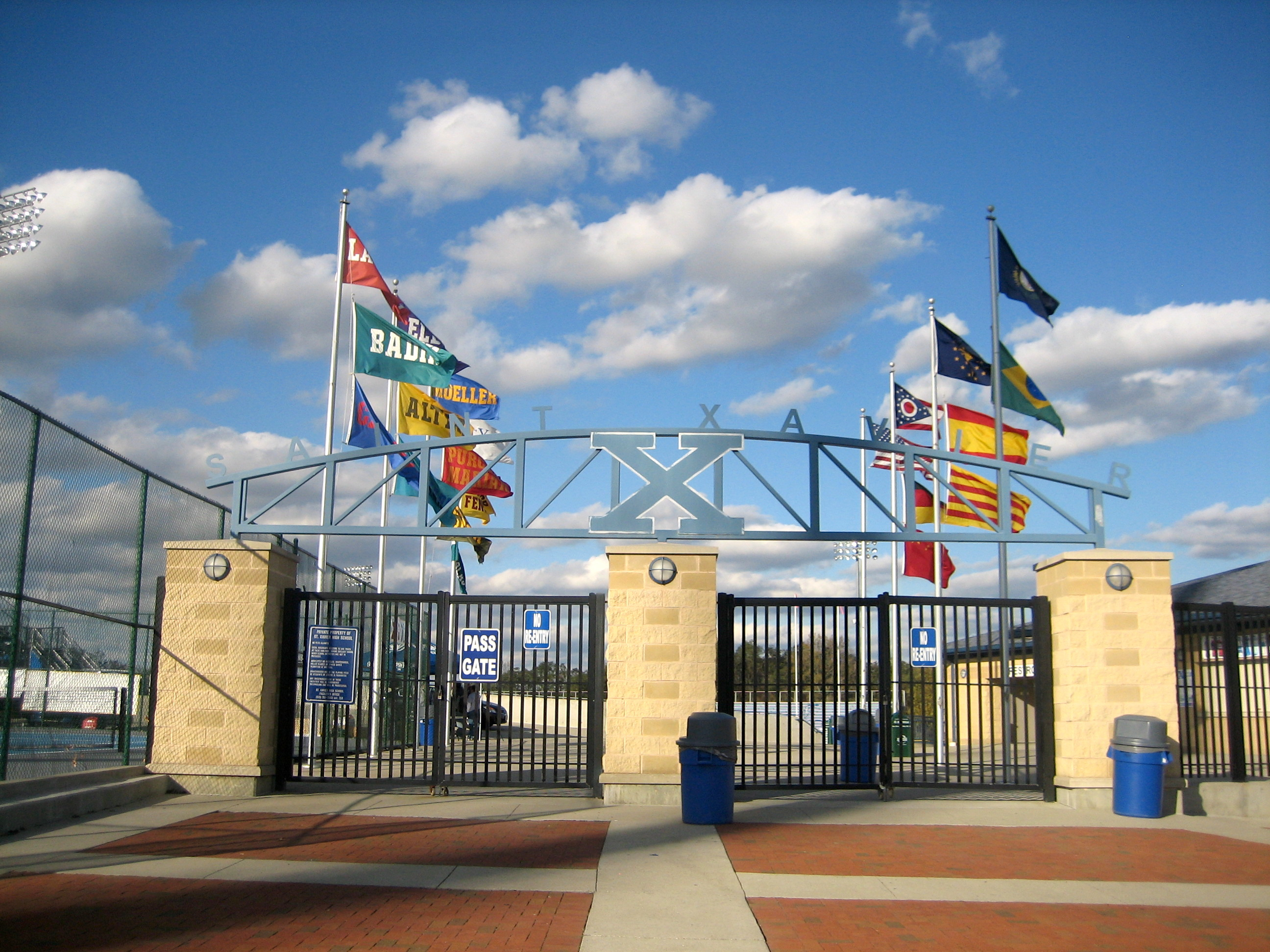
The entrance to RDI Stadium

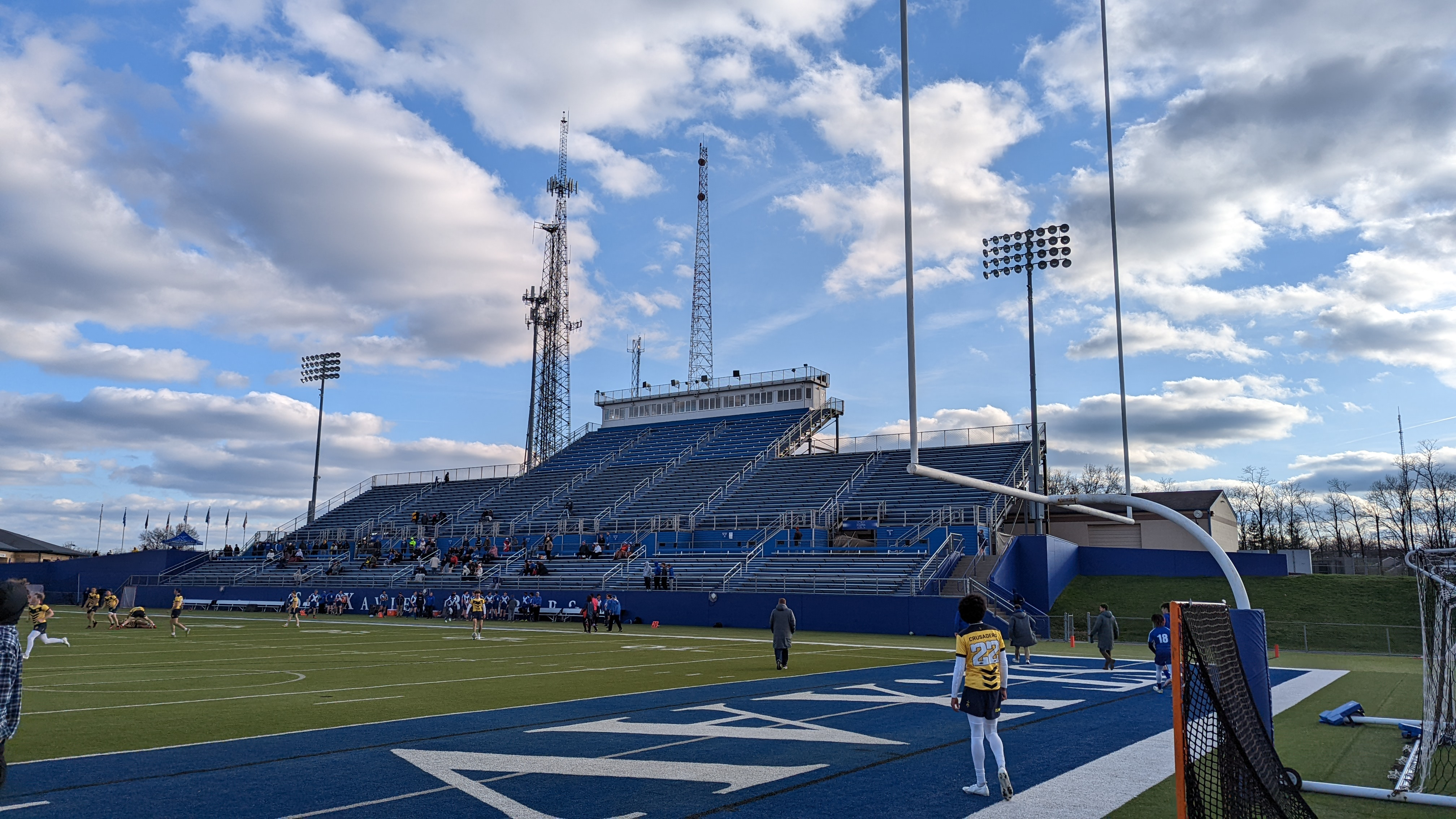
RDI Stadium at Ballaban Field seats 7,500.

St. Xavier's large athletic program was ranked 13th in the nation in 2008 by Sports Illustrated. The school offers 17 Division I athletic programs – baseball, basketball, bowling, cross country, football, golf, hockey, lacrosse, rugby union, soccer, swimming and diving, tennis, track and field, volleyball, water polo, and wrestling. The teams are members of the Greater Catholic League (GCL). As one of four all-male institutions that participate in the GCL's South Division, St. Xavier competes with nearby Elder, La Salle, and Moeller high schools.

St. Xavier's sports teams were originally nicknamed the "Conquistadors", or "Conquerors". Eventually, the teams came to be known as the Bombers. Competing explanations of the name change credit American success in World War II, "bombs" thrown by George Ratterman to Charley Wolf in football or basketball games, and a corruption of the nickname given to Jesuit missionaries in World War II, the "Balmers". The Cincinnati Enquirer first referred to St. Xavier's basketball team as the "Bombers" on January 19, 1944; however, it continued to refer to the football team as the "Conquerors" through the end of the year.

The official school mascot is "Benny the Bomber", a bomber pilot. He was reintroduced in 2019 after a 22-year hiatus. Another school mascot is the "Blue Monster", a shaggy, Muppet-like mascot that takes its name from the student cheering section. It appears at games wearing a Bomber football jersey.

Bomber games are often broadcast on Waycross Community Media. Football games are simulcast on Fox Sports Radio affiliate WSAI, clear-channel ESPN Radio affiliate WCKY, and iHeartRadio. Most athletic events are also broadcast through ESPX, the school's student-run broadcast club.

As of February 10, 2017, 1,178 St. Xavier students were eligible to participate in OHSAA-sanctioned competitions, placing the school in the AAA boys class for the 2017–18 and 2018–19 school years. OHSAA bylaws prohibit residents of Kentucky and Indiana from competing. In 1985, a lawsuit was filed against OHSAA and St. Xavier on behalf of four St. Xavier students who were residents of Kentucky, claiming that the rule violated the Privileges and Immunities Clause of the United States Constitution. The United States Court of Appeals for the Sixth Circuit affirmed the rule in Alerding v. Ohio High School Athletic Association.

=== State championships ===
As of June 2026, the Bombers have won 68 boys team Ohio High School Athletic Association (OHSAA) state titles, tied with St. Edward High School for the most by a single school in Ohio. (Note: Stried, Tim (December 1, 2018). "OHSAA Team State Champions". OHSAA. This source is the most up to date with St. Edward winning the 2021 wrestling championship.) Unless otherwise noted, the titles listed below were won at the Division I level.

==== OHSAA championships ====
- Cross country – 1998, 2000, 2003, 2012, 2013, 2019
- Baseball – 2003, 2026
- Basketball – 2000
- Football – 2005, 2007, 2016, 2020
- Bowling – 2026
- Golf – 1957, 1995, 2008, 2015, 2016
- Lacrosse – 2018, 2025, 2026
- Soccer – 1983
- Swimming – 1970–1981 (12 consecutive), 1984, 1990–1995 (6), 1997, 1999–2007 (9), 2009–2021 (13), 2023, 2024
- Volleyball – 2024

Additionally, St. Xavier students have won state titles for singles or doubles Division I tennis in 1946, 1947, 2002, 2006, 2019, 2023, 2024, and 2026.

==== non-OHSAA state championships ====
- Lacrosse (Ohio High School Lacrosse Association) – 1997,^{(DII)} 2000,^{(DII)} 2015
- Rugby Olympic Sevens (Rugby Ohio) – 2020
- Singles/doubles tennis – 1946, 1947, 2002, 2006, 2019, 2023, 2024, 2026
- Team tennis (Ohio Tennis Coaches' Association) – 2006–2009 (4 consecutive), 2026
- Triathlon (USA Triathlon) – 2017–2019 (3 consecutive)
- Volleyball (Ohio High School Boys Volleyball Association) – 2003, 2006, 2019
- Water polo (Ohio High School Swim Coaches' Association) – 1979, 2015 2016

===== Non-state championship titles =====
- Saber fencing (Southwest Ohio Fencing Association League Championship) – 2012^{(DII)}

==== Swimming and diving ====
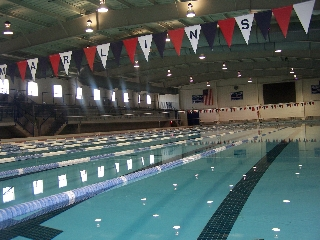
Keating Natatorium is home to the St. Xavier Aquabombers and Cincinnati Marlins.

St. Xavier has fielded a swimming team, known as the "Aquabombers", since 1930. The team began to win statewide titles in 1970, after Keating Natatorium opened on campus. The team has won district, sectional and citywide titles in every year since 1970, capturing 44 Ohio state championships during this span. In 2008, St. Charles Preparatory School of Columbus broke the Aquabombers' nine-year state title streak. The team has earned the distinction of Swimming World national high school swimming team champions in 1973, 1992, 2001, and 2017. From 1988 to 2015, head coach Jim Brower led the Aquabombers to 21 state titles, the most of any men's coach in Ohio high school history. The program produced Swimming World Magazine high school swimmers of the year Joe Hudepohl in 1992 and Jayme Cramer in 2001. Hudepohl was also a member of the United States Olympic Swim Team in 1992 and 1996 and still holds several school, state and national records in swimming. As of 2015, junior Grant House holds a junior world record in the 4 × 200 m freestyle relay.

==== Football ====
In 1999, the Bombers football team appeared on Team Cheerios cereal boxes, alongside St. Ignatius High School, in recognition of the schools' football and community service programs, as well as their records in the National Merit Scholarship Program. On December 3, 2005, under Coach Steve Specht, the Bombers defeated Massillon Washington High School to earn the 2005 state football title, the first in team history, after having finished as state runners-up in 1992, 1998 and 2001. The Bombers ended their season with a perfect record: undefeated in the regular season and the playoffs. For this occasion, the City of Cincinnati declared December 14, 2005 "St. Xavier High School Day". In 2007, the Bombers were rated first or second high school football team nationally in a number of pre-season rankings; the same year, St. Xavier defeated DeMatha Catholic High School in a game nationally televised on ESPN. St. Xavier went on to win their second state championship that year in a 27–0 victory against Mentor High School, as well as the National Prep Poll's mythical national championship. The football program's national exposure continued with losses against Highlands High School on CSTV in 2009 and against Our Lady of Good Counsel High School the next year on ESPN. Specht won the 2013 Don Shula NFL High School Coach of the Year Award and joined the USA Football board of directors later that year. St. Xavier won its third football state championship on December 2, 2016, defeating St. Ignatius High School, 27–20, in double-overtime. With the win, the Bombers became the first Ohio high school football team to win a state championship after losing five games during the regular season. On November 14, 2020, St. Xavier captured its fourth football state championship, defeating Pickerington Central 44–3, which set the record for the largest margin of victory in Ohio Division I state championship history.

As of 2016, the Bombers are one of 15 football teams in the U.S. that wear GPS-based activity trackers developed by Catapult Sports to prevent injuries.

==== Other sports ====
St. Xavier won the state basketball championship in 2000 and finished as runners-up in the 2005 and 2007 state basketball tournament.

The Cross Country team has also demonstrated results, winning Ohio High School Athletic Association (OHSAA) championships in 1998, 2000, 2003, 2012, 2013, and 2019, with runner-up finishes in 1999, 2009 and 2020. The team has demonstrated consistency, having qualified to the OHSAA State Championship Race 29 of the past 30 years since 1987.

Since its founding in 2016, the TriBombers triathlon team has won three Ohio state championships and the 2019 USA Triathlon High School National Championship (Independent Club category).

=== The arts ===
St. Xavier's arts program is centered around three disciplines: performing arts (drama), visual arts, and musical arts. The drama and music disciplines are supplemented by a number of extracurricular programs.

==== Theatre Xavier ====
St. Xavier's co-ed drama group, Theatre Xavier (TX), organizes a drama or comedy each fall, a comedy each spring, and sometimes a smaller January production. St. Xavier students perform alongside students from a dozen public and Catholic high schools throughout the region. Of the 200–225 participants annually, 65%–70% are male. TX performs in the Walter C. Deye, S.J., Performance Center, a 510-seat thrust stage theater space whose size rivals many college theaters. It opened in 2004 as the St. Xavier Performance Center as part of a new fine arts wing. X-Box, an experimental theatre program, put on its inaugural production at the Edinburgh Festival Fringe in August 2018.

TX was directed by performing arts teacher Michele Mascari from 1982 to 2015. It participated in the Cappies of Greater Cincinnati from the awards program's founding in February 2002 through 2012. During that time, TX consistently led the city with 80 awards, including five for Best Musical and one for Best Play. Since 2013, TX has participated in The League of High School Theatres along with Anderson, Indian Hill, and Sycamore high schools.

==== Musical groups ====
St. Xavier sponsors a variety of musical programs, ranging from the marching band to a liturgical music group. The Marching Bombers perform at varsity football games.

Off the field, many St. Xavier students participate in musical groups that primarily perform at school concerts and national competitions. The jazz ensemble, known as Out of the Blue, is considered the St. Xavier select band. The wind ensemble consists of over 100 members. The string ensemble consists of two groups: Chamber Blues, made of bowed instruments, and a larger group called Men in Black that includes guitars.

=== Community service ===
In 1974, St. Xavier became one of the first Cincinnati-area high schools to incorporate service-learning into the curriculum, in response to Jesuit Superior-General Pedro Arrupe's call to "form men for others". Community service at St. Xavier is voluntary, in contrast to mandatory service hours at other area Catholic schools. Seventy-five to eighty percent of the student body voluntarily participates in community service programs.

The school's largest community service program is an Advent canned food drive, organized annually since 1926. Each year, students collect hundreds of thousands of pounds of food and delivers them directly to hundreds of families as well as to food pantries in Greater Cincinnati and rural Appalachia. In 2020, students collected 75,410 pounds (34,210 kg) of food and distributed it to 25 food banks.

=== Student publications ===
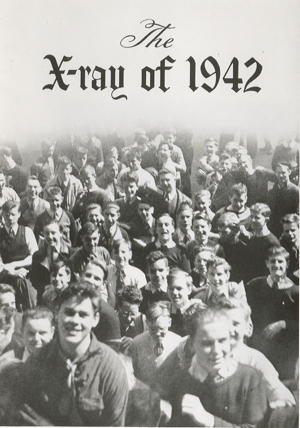
The X-ray of 1942

The Blueprint, the school's student-run paper, is published monthly. Until 2007, The Blueprint was a member of the National Scholastic Press Association. It replaced the Xavier Prep, which was published until at least the 1940s. The Blueprint does not currently offer an online version. Additionally, St. Xavier is undergoing an initiative to organize and archive old editions of The Blueprint dating back into the 20th century. Currently, the paper averages about 28 pages of full-color articles with a unique cover graphic and "Backside" six times a year. Traditionally, the paper is helmed by a faculty moderator, two editors-in-chief, and two editors per each section. The sections included in the paper are Viewpoints, Arts & Entertainment, News, Sports, Student Life, and the Backside. St. X Sports was a section until the fall of 2024, where it was absorbed into the Sports section. The paper is edited in the Blueprint Office located within the school.

The school's other two student publications are X-Ray, the annual yearbook, and Expressions, a student literary magazine founded in 1964 that publishes works of fiction and artwork made by students.

=== Bomber Brew ===
Bomber Brew is a student-run coffee shop that operates from 30 minutes before school opens until the end of lunch (Flex). The Bomber Brew started as competition against the now-defunct Bean Machine, created by students in the Entrepreneurship in Action class. The bomber brew sells everything from energy drinks to smoothies with protein to lattes and their signature vanilla Iced Coffee-xilla.

=== Other clubs ===
The St. Xavier Quiz Team, a member of the Greater Cincinnati Academic League (GCAL), has participated in many statewide tournaments under the direction of Mrs. Nora Denning, the current Latin teacher of St. Xavier. The team made three runner-up finishes in the televised It's Academic Super Bowl championship in 1979, 1980, and 1981. The team won its state championship in 1997 and in 2026. It made two runner-up finishes in the early 1990s and in 2001, losing to Beavercreek High School. The quiz team in 2026 also won National Academic Quiz Tournament for the first time in St. Xavier history.

== Notable people ==
St. Xavier collectively refers to its graduates as the "Long Blue Line", after the school colors and the blue attire worn at graduation. The school's living graduates number over 18,000, as of 2013. Many St. Xavier alumni are well-known figures in the Cincinnati area, and many others have gained recognition nationally and abroad as well. Student-athletes from St. Xavier have gone on to win the Super Bowl, compete in the Olympics, and coach college and professional sports teams. Several graduates have served as state legislators and members of Congress. Alumni have appeared on Broadway and toured with national bands as well as appearing on The New York Times bestseller list. Historically, St. Xavier has produced several bishops.

== See also ==
- List of Jesuit sites
