= Tom Playfair =

1890 book by Francis J. Finn

Tom Playfair; Or Making a Start
- 1891 edition (publ. Benziger Brothers)
- Author: Francis J. Finn
- Language: English
- Series: Fr. Finn’s Famous Three
- Genre: fiction, Children’s literature
- Publication date: 1890
- Publication place: USA
- Media type: Print (hardback & paperback)
- Pages: 255 pp
- ISBN: 978-0-89555-670-7
- OCLC: 48554244
- Followed by: Percy Winn

Tom Playfair; Or Making a Start is a book by a Roman Catholic priest, Fr. Francis J. Finn S.J., originally published in 1890, and written for youths ages 9–12. It has been translated into multiple languages. Finn was inspired by his experiences as a school prefect, with the setting of St. Maure's being a fictionalized version of his school, St. Mary's College, Kansas. Tom Playfair and its two sequels mix comedic stories of school sports, pranks, and classroom anecdotes with moral and theological lessons.

== Synopsis ==
Tom is a mischievous ten-year-old boy living with his father, aunt and uncle in St. Louis. Due to his uncontrollable behavior, his strict and distant father sends him to a Catholic boarding school, St. Maure’s. Tom continues his antics, but is gradually impressed by the positive examples around him. He is inspired to improve his behavior and prepare for his First Communion. This includes befriending a bully whom he had previously mocked and fought with. On a visit with his family, Tom continues to be playful and irreverent, but his escapades are now focused on helping the poor and being kind to others. Regardless, his father thinks Tom is too immature to receive First Communion. Although Tom is initially heartbroken, he humbly chooses to delay his First Communion until the next year. Tom befriends a new student, James Aldine, but James is attacked by a murderer and Tom is unable to save him. On Christmas Day, Tom receives his First Communion and James dies of his injuries. In honor of James, Tom devotes himself to God.

=== Sequels ===
==== Percy Wynn: or Making a Boy Out of Him ====
Percy, an effeminate 13-year-old who had a sheltered upbringing with his ten sisters, arrives at St. Maure’s. 12-year-old Tom Playfair defends him from the other boys’ teasing but is astonished by his formal mannerisms. Tom promises to make a boy of him, and begins introducing him to sports such as baseball and fishing. Percy shows surprising determination and courage, as when he walks four miles across the prairie to warn Tom about some school bullies who are planning to ambush him. The bullies subsequently have a change of heart. Percy is also attacked by a group of boys in town when he steps in to defend a drunken man; this results in the man reconsidering his dislike for religion and sending his own son to St. Maure’s. Finally Percy comforts a dying beggar and makes peace with the town boys. At the end of the school year, Tom concludes that Percy has become a “little man” on his own.

==== Harry Dee: or Making It Out ====
Harry Dee frequently sleepwalks as a child. One night, his uncle is found dead and Harry wakes up covered in his blood. Suspicion for the murder and the theft of a large amount of money falls on Harry’s nurse, who has fled. The uncle's mansion is left abandoned with a reputation for being haunted. Three years later, at age thirteen, the anxious and high-strung Harry arrives at St. Maure’s and meets Tom, Percy, and their friends. They spend time on sports and academics, also taking summer vacations together. Harry confides in the others about the murder and they begin investigating. One day, they encounter Harry’s old nurse in a shop. She believes Harry killed his uncle himself in his sleep; she fled to protect him and knows nothing about the missing money. Harry searches the mansion with help from his uncle’s old servant, Caggett, and discovers a secret drawer containing the money. Caggett was the real murderer, having been trying to find the money that night. Percy arrives in time to rescue Harry. In the final chapter, almost all of the characters have graduated from St. Maure's. Tom is studying in the seminary to become a Jesuit priest, while Percy is doing charity work and planning to start a Catholic magazine for children with Harry.

== Background and reception ==
Finn began working on Tom Playfair during the nights while he was suffering from insomnia. It represents Catholic residential school life and Finn hoped to give his readers his ideal of a genuine Catholic American boy.

Despite being second in order, Percy Wynn was the first book Finn published. After its popularity, he was able to publish the other two books. Tom Playfair was translated into German, Portuguese, Italian, Dutch, Polish and French. It received good reviews and quickly became widely read, with the series filling a gap for Catholic children's fiction. It was often described as a Catholic version of Tom Brown's School Days.

A reviewer for The Month praised Tom Playfair, but criticized the violent plot points. The same magazine had similar criticism for Harry Dee, which makes an abrupt tonal shift from previous books in the series; it is more focused on academic achievements with the characters aging towards graduation, but also has an overarching murder mystery.
