= Francis J. Finn =

American novelist

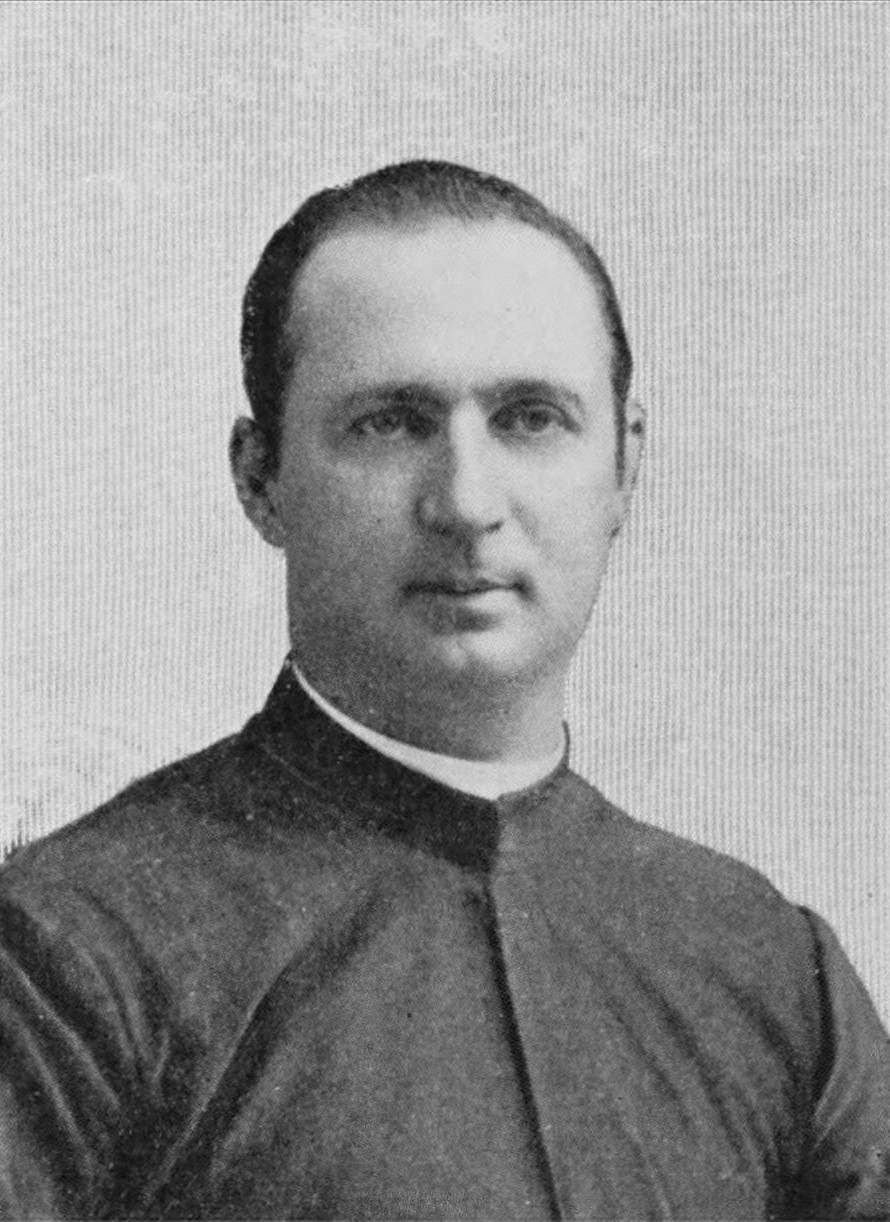
- Born: October 4, 1859; St. Louis, MO
- Died: November 2, 1928 (aged 69); Cincinnati, OH
- Occupations: Catholic priest, novelist
- Writing career
- Genres: adventure, juvenile
- Website: www.kancoll.org/khq/1943/43_2_faherty.htm

Father Francis J. Finn, (October 4, 1859 – November 2, 1928) was an American Jesuit priest who has been called the "Catholic Horatio Alger". He wrote a series of 27 popular novels for young people, which contain likeable characters and adventure, and emphasize the importance of prayer and keeping true to the values of the Catholic Faith.

== Early life ==
Francis J. Finn was born on October 4, 1859, in St. Louis, Missouri. His parents, John Finn and Mary Whyte Finn, were both Irish immigrants. He attended parochial schools. As a boy, Francis was deeply impressed with Cardinal Wiseman's famous novel of the early Christian martyrs, Fabiola. Eleven-year-old Francis was a voracious reader; he read the works of Charles Dickens, including Nicholas Nickleby and The Pickwick Papers. From his First Communion at age 12, Francis began to desire to become a Jesuit priest. Fr. Charles Coppens urged Francis to apply himself to his Latin, to improve it by using an all-Latin prayerbook, and to read good Catholic books. Fr. Finn credited his vocation to this advice and to his membership in the Sodality of Our Lady.

== Priesthood ==
He entered the Society of Jesus in 1879 after graduating from St. Louis University. Francis began his Jesuit novitiate and seminary studies on March 24. As a young Jesuit scholastic, he suffered from repeated bouts of sickness. He would be sent home to recover, would return in robust health, then would come down with another ailment. Normally this would have been seen as a sign that he did not have a vocation, yet his superiors kept him on. Fr. Finn commented, “God often uses instruments most unfit to do His work.”

In 1881 Finn was assigned as a prefect of St. Mary's boarding school or "college" in St. Mary's College, Kansas (which became the fictional “St. Maure's” of his novels). Francis was ordained to the priesthood in 1891, and after some time at Marquette University in Milwaukee, Wisconsin, he came to St. Xavier College (now Xavier University) in Cincinnati. Fr. Finn spent many years of his priestly life at St. Xavier's. There he was well loved, and it is said that wherever he went—if he took a taxi, ate at a restaurant, attended a baseball game—people would not take his money for their services, but instead would press money into his hand for his many charities. During the 1920s Fr. Finn served as a trustee of Xavier University.

In 1904 he served as the first director of the St. Xavier Commercial School for girls, which offered a two-year course of study including stenography, book-keeping, and typesetting.

Father Francis J. Finn died in Cincinnati, Ohio, on November 2, 1928.

== Children's author ==
Before 1865, most American Catholic Literature was either translated from French, German, or Flemish books, or reprints from English and Irish works.

At St. Mary's College Finn learned how to teach and discipline boys. He would offer to tell stories to the students in exchange for good behavior. He began with Oliver Twist. One afternoon while supervising a class busy writing a composition, he had the idea to write about young male, Catholic students and their lives. Shortly thereafter, he created the first Tom Playfair novel.

The American Catholic Who's Who, called Fr. Finn is “the foremost Catholic writer of fiction for young people.” His books were available in Braille, and were translated into French, German, Flemish, Italian, Polish, Bohemian, Hungarian, Spanish, Caledonian and Portuguese. It was Fr. Finn's lifelong conviction that "One of the greatest things in the world is to get the right book into the hands of the right boy or girl. No one can indulge in reading to any extent without being largely influenced for better or worse."

== Legacy ==
In 1925, Finn gave the Xavier University athletic teams the nickname, "The Musketeers". The university bestows the Father Francis J. Finn, S.J. Award on the member of the graduating class who best exemplifies qualities of Father Finn's fictional heroes: strong spiritual values, leadership and breadth of interest.

Finn's children's stories continue to be read, particularly in home school curriculums.

== Bibliography ==
- Tom Playfair; or, Making a Start (1890)
- Percy Wynn; or, Making a Boy of Him (1891)
- Harry Dee; or, Working It Out (1892)
- Claude Lightfoot; or, How the Problem Was Solved (1893)
- Mostly Boys: Short Stories (1894)
- Ethelred Preston; or, the Adventures of a Newcomer (1896)
- Ada Merton (1896)
- New Faces and Old (1896)
- Echoes from Bethlehem (1897)
- That Football Game, and What Came of It (1897)
- The Best Foot Forward; and Other Stories (1899)
- His First and Last Appearance (1900)
- But Thy Love and Thy Grace (1901)
- The Fairy of the Snows (1913)
- That Office Boy (1915)
- Cupid of Campion (1916)
- Lucky Bob (1917)
- His Luckiest Year (a sequel to Lucky Bob) (1918)
- Facing Danger (1919)
- Bobby in Movieland (1921)
- On the Run (1922)
- Lord Bountiful (1923)
- The Story of Jesus (1924)
- Sunshine and Freckles (1925)
- Candles' Beams (1926)
- Boys' and Girl's Prayer Book (1926)
- Father Finn, S.J.: The Story of His Life Told by Himself for His Friends Young and Old (edited and with an introduction by Daniel S. Lord, S.J.) (1929)
