= Clement Meadmore =

Australian-American designer (1929–2005)

- Curl, 1968. Columbia University campus, New York, NY
- Born: 9 February 1929; Melbourne, Victoria, Australia
- Died: 19 April 2005 (aged 76); New York, New York, United States
- Known for: Design

Dervish, 1972. Currier Museum of Art, Manchester, New Hampshire

Clement Meadmore (9 February 1929 – 19 April 2005) was an Australian-American furniture designer and sculptor known for massive outdoor steel sculptures.

== Biography ==
Born Clement Lyon Meadmore in Melbourne, Australia in 1929, Clement Meadmore studied aeronautical engineering and then industrial design at the Royal Melbourne Institute of Technology. After graduating in 1949, Meadmore designed furniture for several years and, in the 1950s, created his first welded sculptures. He had several one-man exhibits of his sculptures in Melbourne and Sydney between 1954 and 1962. In 1963, Meadmore moved to New York City. Later, he became an American citizen.

Meadmore used COR-TEN steel, aluminium, and occasionally bronze to create colossal outdoor sculptures which combine the elements of abstract expressionism and minimalism.

Earlier in his career he worked as a furniture designer, of which his DC601A chair is a well known example.

He was an avid amateur drummer and jazz lover who held jam sessions in his home. His fondness for jazz is reflected in the names of several of his works, including "Riff" (1996), "Round Midnight" (1996), "Stormy Weather" (1997), "Night and Day" (1979) and "Perdido" (1978).

Meadmore's sculptures are held by museums, corporate headquarters, and schools internationally. His work has been exhibited in a number of galleries, including the Anita Shapolsky Gallery in New York City, the Columbus Gallery of Fine Art in Ohio, and the Davenport Municipal Art Gallery in Iowa.

He authored How to Make Furniture Without Tools (1975) and The Modern Chair: Classic Designs by Thonet, Breuer, Le Corbusier, Eames and Others (1997). His work and career were catalogued in The Sculpture of Clement Meadmore (1994) by Eric Gibson.

== Death ==
Meadmore died at age 76 in Manhattan from complications of Parkinson's disease.

== Publications ==
=== Books by Meadmore ===
- How to Make Furniture Without Tools (Pantheon, 1975) (ISBN 0-394-73063-1)
- The Modern Chair: Classic Designs by Thonet, Breuer, Le Corbusier, Eames and Others (Dover, 1997) (ISBN 0-486-29807-8)

=== Books about Meadmore ===
- The Sculpture of Clement Meadmore by Eric Gibson (Hudson Hills, 1994) (ISBN 1-55595-098-1)

== Sculptures in public collections and public spaces ==
=== Australia ===
- Australian Capital Territory
  - Virginia, 1970, National Gallery of Australia, Canberra
- Victoria
  - Awakening, 1968, AMP Society, Melbourne
  - Dervish, 1981, Victorian Arts Centre, Melbourne
  - Paraphernalia, 1999, McClelland Gallery and Sculpture Park, Langwarrin, Melbourne
- New South Wales
  - Silence, 1960, Art Gallery of New South Wales, Sydney
  - Thunder, 1960, Art Gallery of New South Wales, Sydney
  - Double Up, 1970, Art Gallery of New South Wales, Sydney
  - Flippant Flurry, 1977, Art Gallery of New South Wales, Sydney
  - Hereabout, 1971/2001, Newcastle Art Gallery, Newcastle
- Western Australia
  - Between 1979–1980, 1981, Perth Cultural Centre, Perth
- Queensland
  - Offshoot, 1982, Queensland Government, Brisbane

=== United States ===
- California
  - Bent, 1966, Newport Harbor Art Museum, Newport Beach
  - Up Ended, 1969, University of California Art Museum, Santa Barbara
- District of Columbia
  - Riding High, 1977, Gallaudet College, Washington
- Florida
  - Trans, 1972, Performance Asset Management, West Palm Beach
  - Northbridge Center, West Palm Beach
- Illinois
  - Spiral, 1971, Nathan Manilow Sculpture Park, University Park
- Iowa
  - Sophisticated Lady, 1977, Figge Art Museum, Davenport
- Kentucky
  - Fling, 1971, Speed Art Museum, Louisville
- Kansas
  - Always, 1992, Johnson County Community College, Overland Park
- Louisiana
  - Out of There, 1974, Hale Boggs Federal Building Plaza, New Orleans
  - Flippant Flurry, 1977, Mrs. P. Roussel Norman, New Orleans
- Massachusetts
  - Upsurge, 1989, Diana Chapman Walsh Alumnae Hall, Wellesley College, Wellesley
- Michigan
  - Hob Nob, 1992, University of Michigan, North Campus, Ann Arbor
  - Upcast, 1985, Southfield Rd & Maple Rd, Birmingham
  - Virginia, 1970, Detroit Institute of Arts, Detroit
  - Split Ring, 1969, Woodland Mall, Grand Rapids
  - However, 1998, Dennos Museum Center, Traverse City
- New Hampshire
  - Dervish, 1972, Currier Museum of Art, Manchester
  - Perdido, 1978, Dartmouth College, Hanover
- New Jersey
  - Offshoot, 1982, Grounds for Sculpture, Hamilton
  - Upstart 2, 1973, Entrance to the Engineering Quadrangle, Princeton University, Princeton
- New York
  - Verge, 1970, Governor Nelson A. Rockefeller Empire State Plaza Art Collection, Albany
  - Turn Out, 1967, Governor Nelson A. Rockefeller Empire State Plaza Art Collection, Albany
  - Wingspread, 1999, 400 Chambers Street, Manhattan
  - Curl, 1968, Columbia University, New York
  - Swing, 1969, Chase Manhattan Bank, New York
  - Wave, 1969, Chase Manhattan Bank, New York
  - Three Up, 1977, White Plains Courthouse, White Plains
  - Untitled, 1971, Sarah Lawrence College, Bronxville
- Ohio
  - Open End, 1984, St. Xavier High School, Cincinnati
  - Branching Out, 1981, Cleveland Museum of Art, Cleveland
  - Out of There, 1974, Columbus Museum of Art, Columbus
  - Extent, 1981, Pyramid Sculpture Park, Hamilton
  - Clench, 1979, 34555 Chagrin Boulevard, Moreland Hills
  - Switchback, 1980, 811 Madison, Toledo
  - Upbeat, 1984, Butler Institute of American Art, Youngstown
- Oregon
  - Split Ring, 1969, Portland Art Museum, Portland
- Pennsylvania
  - Up and Away, 1977, PNC Plaza, Pittsburgh
  - Hence, 1977, Hartwood Acres Park, Pittsburgh
  - Cross Current, 1980, Smith Kline Corporation, Philadelphia
- Texas
  - Upbeat, 1984, the Colonnade, Dallas
  - Split Level, 1971, University of Houston, Houston
- Vermont
  - Around and About, 1971, Middlebury College, Middlebury
- Virginia
  - Lake Fairfax Business Center, Reston
- Wisconsin
  - Double Up, 1970, Lynden Sculpture Garden, Milwaukee
  - Upstart I, 1967, Lynden Sculpture Garden, Milwaukee

=== International ===
- Canada
  - Upstart II, 1970, Robert McLaughlin Gallery, Oshawa, Ontario
- Japan
  - Crescendo, 1989, Tokyo Metropolitan Theatre, Tokyo, Japan
- Mexico
  - Janus, 1968, Ruta de la Amistad, Mexico City, Mexico
- Taiwan
  - Portal, 1995, Kaohsiung Museum of Fine Arts, Kaohsiung City, Taiwan
