= Upstart (sculpture) =

Public art work by Clement Meadmore

Coordinates: 43°10′31.8″N 87°56′15.7″W

- Artist: Clement Meadmore
- Year: 1967
- Type: weathering steel
- Location: Lynden Sculpture Garden; Milwaukee, Wisconsin
- Owner: Bradley Family Foundation

Upstart is a public art work by Australian-American artist Clement Meadmore located at the Lynden Sculpture Garden near Milwaukee, Wisconsin. The sculpture is an abstract, twisting form made of weathering steel; it is installed on the lawn.
