= St. Xavier Commercial School =

Saint Xavier Commercial School

Location
- Cincinnati, Ohio; United States; 39.103604°N 84.509465°W

Information
- Type: Private
- Denomination: Roman Catholic
- Patron saint: St. Francis Xavier
- Opened: 1904
- Closed: 1960
- Authority: Roman Catholic Archdiocese of Cincinnati
- Grades: 9–10
- Gender: Predominantly female
- Affiliation: Sisters of Notre Dame de Namur

St. Xavier Parish Commercial School, officially The Convent School, was a private secondary school in Cincinnati, Ohio, United States. Founded in 1904 by the Sisters of Notre Dame de Namur, it remained open until 1960. It was associated with St. Francis Xavier Church of the Roman Catholic Archdiocese of Cincinnati. Fr. Francis J. Finn, S.J., served as its first director.

The school was located on Sixth Street downtown, between Sycamore and Main Streets—most likely at 520 Sycamore St. It offered "a two-year course of study—primarily for women—in the business arts", including "stenography, book-keeping, and typesetting". Boys from St. Xavier High School also took typing classes there; once the Commercial School closed, the high school moved to Finneytown and the parish remained at the downtown location.

Tuition was $50 a year during the 1950s.

== Notable students ==
- Mildred Howard (attended 1953) – Republican candidate for United States President, 1992, 1996, 2000, 2004, 2008

== Notable faculty ==
- Francis J. Finn, S.J. – school director; well-known author

== History ==
The following was posted on "The Catholic Telegraph Photography Project" as a reprint of an article in The Catholic Telegraph from August 25, 1944:

1944: “St. Xavier's Commercial School for Girls was founded in 1904 by Father Finn, S.J., the famous author of juvenile books for boys. Its progress through the years has kept pace with the various changes in the business world, until today, in its equipment and modern methods, it is one of Cincinnati's foremost business schools. The Rev. Julian A. Garrity, S.J., is the director of St. Xavier's Commercial School for Girls and the Sisters of Notre Dame de Namur teach in the school.

“Two programs are now available. The new intensive secretarial course is open to high school graduates only. This program is arranged so that the students receive individual instruction and are, therefore, capable of progressing according to their maximum ability. The complete course of study including stenography, typewriting, bookkeeping, business correspondence, secretarial practice, comptometry, dictaphone, and office machines offers an opportunity for each girl to fit herself for a business career.

“The standard course comprises two years of commercial training for girls who have either not begun or who have not completed their high school training. This program consists of religion, business correspondence, word study, shorthand, bookkeeping, typewriting, business law, rapid calculation, secretarial practice, besides comptometry, dictaphone, mimeographing, and other office machines.

“The school's free placement bureau has enjoyed remarkable success in placing its graduates in responsible positions with many of the outstanding business firms in Cincinnati.” (The Catholic Telegraph, August 25, 1944)
