= Out of There =

Sculpture in Columbus, Ohio, U.S.

- The sculpture in 2018
- Artist: Clement Meadmore
- Year: 1974
- Movement: Aluminum sculpture
- Location: Columbus, Ohio; New Orleans

Out of There is a 1974 aluminum sculpture by Clement Meadmore.

== Editions ==
There are two editions, one of which is installed outside the Columbus Museum of Art, in Columbus, Ohio, United States (39.964080°N 82.987621°W). The abstract artwork, painted black, is 78 inches tall and 201 inches long. It was donated to the museum by the Ashland Oil Company in 1979.

The other copy is installed along Camp Street just south of the Hale Boggs Federal Building in New Orleans, Louisiana (29.948271°N 90.069502°W).

== See also ==
- 1974 in art
