= Double Up (sculpture) =

Sculpture by Clement Meadmore

Coordinates: 43°10′32.7″N 87°56′16.2″W

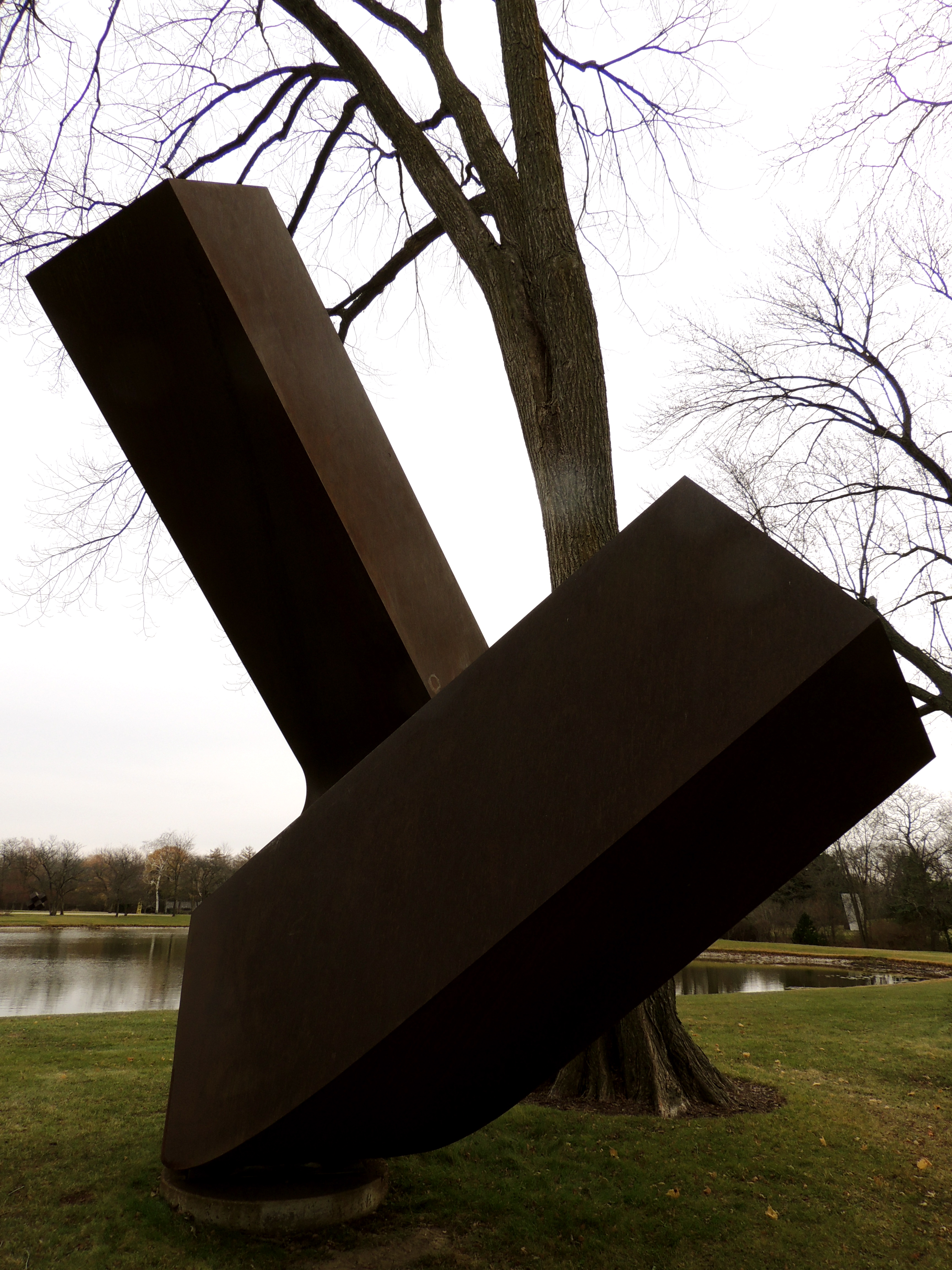
- Artist: Clement Meadmore
- Year: 1970
- Type: weathering steel
- Location: Lynden Sculpture Garden; Milwaukee, Wisconsin
- Owner: Bradley Family Foundation

Double Up is a public art work by Australian-American artist Clement Meadmore located at the Lynden Sculpture Garden near Milwaukee, Wisconsin. The sculpture is an abstract, twisting form made of weathering steel; it is installed on the lawn.
