= Open-ended =

Open-ended may refer to:

- Open-ended (gameplay), dynamic situations or scenarios that allow the individual to determine the outcome
- Open-ended (poker), situation in poker where the player has four of five cards needed for a straight that can be completed at either end
- Open-ended contract, a contract with no definite time limit
- Open-ended investment company, a type of open-ended collective investment in the United Kingdom
- Open-ended question
- "Open Ended," song by Sebadoh from their 1996 album Harmacy
- Open-end fund, collective investment which can issue and redeem shares at any time

== See also ==
- Open end (disambiguation)
- Open problem, or open question
- Open-question argument, a philosophical argument put forward by British philosopher G. E. Moore
