= Open End (sculpture) =

- Artist: Clement Meadmore
- Year: August 1984
- Type: Silicon bronze, steel sheet metal
- Dimensions: 3.4 m × 2.7 m × 8.38 m (11 ft × 9 ft × 27 ft 6 in)
- Location: Springfield Township, Hamilton County, Ohio, United States; 39°12′29″N 84°30′17.4″W
- Owner: St. Xavier High School

Open End is an abstract public art sculpture by Clement Meadmore. The 11-foot-high (3.4 m), 5-short-ton (4.5 t) curved metal beam is located on the grounds of St. Xavier High School in Springfield Township, Hamilton County, Ohio, United States. It was previously located in downtown Cincinnati.

== Description ==
Open End rises out of the ground, bends 90 degrees to run along the horizontal plane, folds back on itself to run in the opposite direction, gently bends to the left while rotating slightly counterclockwise, folds again, and slopes downward toward the pedestal before curling back to point in the same direction as the second fold.

== History ==
In 1984, Linclay Corporation commissioned Meadmore to design a sculpture for the three-story, brick plaza at the corner of Sixth and Vine Streets, in front of the Cincinnati Commerce Center that Linclay was developing. The Commerce Center, later known as the Convergys Center, was one of several International Style office towers that went up that year. The hollow bronze and steel sculpture was manufactured for $100,000 by the Tallix Foundry in Beacon, New York, and dedicated in August 1984.

Downtown passersby expressed puzzlement at Open End. Meadmore intended the work as "a bridge between the scale of the pedestrians and that of the building". Unfortunately, the scale of the sculpture itself became a problem, as pedestrians frequently injured their heads by walking into its two large prongs. To protect pedestrians, especially the blind, a 10-inch-high (25 cm) curb was later built around the perimeter of the installation.

In 1992, the Save Outdoor Sculpture! project noted gouging and "minimal graffiti" on the sculpture's surface and suspected that water was collecting inside the pedestal.

In June 1999, Prudential Insurance Company restored the sculpture and donated it to St. Xavier before remodeling the plaza. Open End was reinstalled on October 20, 1999, at the Math Wing entrance outside Berning Gymnasium, where it can be seen from West North Bend Road. St. Xavier students have compared the sculpture to Gumby.

Meadmore's 12-by-5-inch (300 mm × 130 mm) artist's proof was sold at auction in 2011 to benefit the Cleveland Play House.
