= Hungary at the 1968 Summer Olympics =

- IOC code: HUN
- NOC: Hungarian Olympic Committee

in Mexico City
- Competitors: 167 (135 men and 32 women) in 15 sports
- Flag bearer: Gergely Kulcsár
- Medals Ranked 4th: Gold 10 Silver 10 Bronze 12 Total 32

Summer Olympics appearances (overview)
- 1896; 1900; 1904; 1908; 1912; 1920; 1924; 1928; 1932; 1936; 1948; 1952; 1956; 1960; 1964; 1968; 1972; 1976; 1980; 1984; 1988; 1992; 1996; 2000; 2004; 2008; 2012; 2016; 2020; 2024; 2028

Other related appearances
- 1906 Intercalated Games

Hungary competed at the 1968 Summer Olympics in Mexico City, Mexico. 167 competitors, 135 men and 32 women, took part in 116 events in 15 sports.

== Medalists ==
=== Gold ===
- Gyula Zsivótzky — Athletics, Men's Hammer Throw
- Angéla Németh — Athletics, Women's Javelin Throw
- Mihály Hesz — Canoeing, Men's K1 1.000m Kayak Singles
- Tibor Tatai — Canoeing, Men's C1 1.000m Canadian Singles
- Győző Kulcsár — Fencing, Men's Épée Individual
- Csaba Fenyvesi, Győző Kulcsár, Pál Nagy, Zoltán Nemere, and Pál Schmitt — Fencing, Men's Épée Team
- András Balczó, István Móna, and Ferenc Török — Modern Pentathlon, Men's Team Competition
- István Básti, Antal Dunai, Lajos Dunai, Károly Fatér, László Fazekas, István Juhász, László Keglovich, Lajos Kocsis, Iván Menczel, László Nagy, Ernő Noskó, Dezső Novák, Miklós Páncsics, István Sárközi, Miklós Szalay, Zoltán Szarka, and Lajos Szűcs — Football (soccer), Men's Team Competition
- János Varga — Wrestling, Men's Greco-Roman Bantamweight
- István Kozma — Wrestling, Men's Greco-Roman Heavyweight

=== Silver ===
- Antal Kiss — Athletics, Men's 50 km Walk
- Csaba Giczy and István Timár — Canoeing, Men's K2 1.000m Kayak Pairs (Men)
- Gyula Petrikovics and Tamás Wichmann — Canoeing, Men's C2 1.000m Canadian Pairs
- Anna Pfeffer and Katalin Rozsnyói — Canoeing, Women's K2 500m Kayak Pairs
- Jenő Kamuti — Fencing, Men's Foil Individual
- Ildikó Bóbis, Paula Marosi, Mária Gulácsy, Lídia Dömölky, and Ildikó Rejtő — Fencing, Women's Foil Team
- András Balczó — Modern Pentathlon, Men's Individual Competition
- József Csermely, Antal Melis, Zoltán Melis, and György Sarlós — Rowing, Men's Coxless Fours
- László Hammerl — Shooting, Men's Small-bore Rifle, prone
- Imre Földi — Weightlifting, Men's Bantamweight

=== Bronze ===
- Lázár Lovász — Athletics, Men's Hammer Throw
- Gergely Kulcsár — Athletics, Men's Javelin Throw
- Jolán Kleiber-Kontsek — Athletics, Women's Discus Throw
- Annamária Kovács — Athletics, Women's Pentathlon
- István Csizmadia, Csaba Giczy, Imre Szőllősi, and István Tímár — Canoeing, Men's K2 K4 1.000m Kayak Fours
- Tibor Pézsa — Fencing, Men's Sabre Individual
- Péter Bakonyi, János Kalmár, Tamás Kovács, Miklós Meszéna, and Tibor Pézsa — Fencing, Men's Sabre Team
- Ildikó Rejtő — Fencing, Women's Foil Individual
- Károly Bakos — Weightlifting, Men's Middleweight
- András Bodnár, Zoltán Dömötör, László Felkai, Ferenc Konrád III, János Konrád II, Mihály Mayer, László Sárosi, János Steinmetz, Endre Molnár, Dénes Pácsik and István Szívós Jr. — Water Polo, Men's Team Competition
- Károly Bajkó — Wrestling, Men's Greco-Roman Welterweight
- József Csatári — Wrestling, Men's Freestyle Light Heavyweight

== Cycling ==
Seven cyclists represented Hungary in 1968.

Individual road race

- Imre Géra
- Ferenc Keserű
- András Takács
- Tibor Magyar

Team time trial

- András Takács
- András Mészáros
- Imre Géra
- Tibor Magyar

Sprint

- András Baranyecz

1000m time trial

- Tibor Lendvai

Tandem

- András Baranyecz
- Tibor Lendvai

== Fencing ==
20 fencers, 15 men and 5 women, represented Hungary in 1968.

Men's foil

- Jenő Kamuti
- Sándor Szabó
- László Kamuti

Men's team foil

- Sándor Szabó, Jenő Kamuti, László Kamuti, Gábor Füredi, Attila May

Men's épée

- Győző Kulcsár
- Csaba Fenyvesi
- Zoltán Nemere

Men's team épée

- Zoltán Nemere, Győző Kulcsár, Pál B. Nagy, Csaba Fenyvesi, Pál Schmitt

Men's sabre

- Tibor Pézsa
- Tamás Kovács
- Péter Bakonyi

Men's team sabre

- Tibor Pézsa, Miklós Meszéna, János Kalmár, Péter Bakonyi, Tamás Kovács

Women's foil

- Ildikó Ságiné Ujlakyné Rejtő, Lídia Sákovicsné Dömölky, Ildikó Farkasinszky-Bóbis

Women's team foil

- Ildikó Ságiné Ujlakyné Rejtő, Ildikó Farkasinszky-Bóbis, Paula Marosi, Lídia Sákovicsné Dömölky, Mária Gulácsy

== Modern pentathlon ==
Three male pentathletes represented Hungary in 1968. They won gold in the team event and András Balczó won a silver in the individual event.

Individual

- András Balczó
- István Móna
- Ferenc Török

Team

- András Balczó
- István Móna
- Ferenc Török

== Shooting ==
Six shooters, all men, represented Hungary in 1968.

25 m pistol

- Aladár Dobsa
- Szilárd Kun

50 m pistol

- László Mucza

300 m rifle, three positions

- Lajos Papp
- Ferenc Petrovácz

50 m rifle, three positions

- László Hammerl
- Ferenc Petrovácz

50 m rifle, prone

- László Hammerl
- Lajos Papp

== Swimming ==
Men

Athlete	Event	Heat		Semifinal		Final	
Athlete	Event	Time	Rank	Time	Rank	Time	Rank
Csaba Csatlós	100 m freestyle	56.6	36	Did not advance			
Gábor Kucsera	100 m freestyle	55.1	=12 Q	55.0	16	Did not advance	
Mátyás Borlói	200 m freestyle	2:06.5	34	—N/a		Did not advance	
Csaba Csatlós	200 m freestyle	2:10.0	=43	—N/a		Did not advance	
Gábor Kucsera	200 m freestyle	2:12.8	49	—N/a		Did not advance	
Mátyás Borlói	400 m freestyle	4:35.4	27	—N/a		Did not advance	
Csaba Csatlós	400 m freestyle	4:47.6	=30	—N/a		Did not advance	
László Cseh Sr.	100 m backstroke	1:04.6	=22	Did not advance			
Mátyás Borlói	200 m backstroke	2:17.9	11	—N/a		Did not advance	
Sándor Szabó	100 m breaststroke	1:11.3	24 Q	1:11.1	20	Did not advance	
István Szentirmay	100 m butterfly	1:01.0	29	Did not advance			
Péter Lázár	200 m medley	2:17.1	6 Q	—N/a		2:18.3	8
István Szentirmay	200 m medley	2:21.0	17	—N/a		Did not advance	
Péter Lázár	400 m medley	5:10.6	16	—N/a		Did not advance	
Péter Lázár; István Szentirmay; Csaba Csatlós; Gábor Kucsera	4×100 m freestyle	3:42.4	5	—N/a		Did not advance	
László Cseh Sr. Sándor Szabó; István Szentirmay; Gábor Kucsera	4×100 m medley	4:08.8	11	—N/a		Did not advance	

Women

Athlete	Event	Heat		Semifinal		Final	
Athlete	Event	Time	Rank	Time	Rank	Time	Rank
Edit Kovács	100 m freestyle	1:03.7	20 Q	1:03.5	=20	Did not advance	
Magdolna Patóh	100 m freestyle	1:03.8	=21 Q	1:03.8	22	Did not advance	
Judit Turóczy	100 m freestyle	1:02.1	7 Q	1:01.8	6 Q	1:01.6	8
Mária Balla-Lantos	100 m backstroke	1:11.9	=20	Did not advance			
Judit Baranyi	100 m backstroke	1:16.0	35	Did not advance			
Andrea Gyarmati	100 m backstroke	1:11.3	=13 Q	1:09.9	7 Q	1:09.1	5
Márta Egerváry	100 m breaststroke	1:22.6	=23	Did not advance			
Andrea Gyarmati	100 m butterfly	1:07.4	4 Q	1:06.6	5 Q	1:06.8	5
Márta Egerváry	200 m medley	2:40.7	17	—N/a		Did not advance	
Judit Turóczy	200 m medley	2:38.8	13	—N/a		Did not advance	
Edit Kovács; Magdolna Patóh; Andrea Gyarmati; Judit Turóczy	4×100 m freestyle	4:13.6	4 Q	—N/a		4:11.0	5
Mária Balla-Lantos; Edit Kovács; Andrea Gyarmati; Judit Turóczy	4×100 m medley	4:41.2	8 Q	—N/a		4:42.9	8

== Water polo ==
Men's Team Competition

- Preliminary Round (Group A)

- Defeated West Germany (6:4)
- Defeated Spain (7:1)
- Defeated United States (5:1)
- Defeated Soviet Union (6:5)
- Defeated Brazil (8:2)
- Defeated Cuba (7:1)

- Semifinals

- Lost to Yugoslavia (6:8)

- Bronze Medal Match

- Defeated Italy (9:4) → Bronze Medal

- Team Roster

- Mihály Mayer
- András Bodnár
- Zoltán Dömötör
- László Felkai
- Ferenc Konrád
- János Konrád
- Endre Molnár
- Dénes Pócsik
- László Sárosi
- János Steinmetz
- István Szívós Jr.
