= Swimming at the 1968 Summer Olympics – Men's 4 × 100 metre freestyle relay =

Men's 4 × 100 metre freestyle relay at the Games of the XIX Olympiad
- Venue: Alberca Olímpica Francisco Márquez
- Dates: 17 October 1968 (heats & final)
- Competitors: 69 from 16 nations
- Winning time: 3:31.7 WR

Medalists
| 1st place, gold medalist(s) | | Zac Zorn, Stephen Rerych, Mark Spitz, Ken Walsh, William Johnson*, David Johnson*, Michael Wall*, Don Schollander* | United States |
| 2nd place, silver medalist(s) | | Semyon Belits-Geiman, Viktor Mazanov, Georgijs Kuļikovs, Leonid Ilyichov, Sergey Gusev* | Soviet Union |
| 3rd place, bronze medalist(s) | | Greg Rogers, Robert Cusack, Bob Windle, Mike Wenden *Swimmers who participated in the heats only. Under 1968 Olympic rules, they did not receive a medal. | Australia |

The men's 4 × 100 metre freestyle relay event at the 1968 Olympic Games took place 17 October. The relay featured teams of four swimmers each swimming two lengths of the 50 m pool freestyle.

== Results ==
=== Heats ===
4 fastest teams from each heat advance to the final

Heat 1

| Rank | Nation | Swimmers | Time | Notes |
|---|---|---|---|---|
| 1 | Soviet Union | Leonid Ilyichov (54.4); Sergey Gusev (54.7); Viktor Mazanov (54.6); Semyon Belits-Geiman (54.1) | 3:37.8 | Q |
| 2 | Canada | Glen Finch (57.5); George Smith (53.2); Ralph Hutton (54.8); Sandy Gilchrist (54.8) | 3:40.3 | Q |
| 3 | Great Britain | Mike Turner (55.5); Bobby McGregor (55.0); David Hembrow (55.8); Tony Jarvis (54.1) | 3:40.4 | Q |
| 4 | Japan | Kunihiro Iwasaki (55.8); Masayuki Osawa (54.5); Satoru Nakano (55.9); Teruhiko Kitani (55.6) | 3:41.8 | Q |
| 5 | Spain | José Antonio Chicoy (55.1); Juan Fortuny (56.3); Juan Martinez (56.2); Diego Martel (55.1) | 3:42.7 | |
| 6 | Sweden | Lester Eriksson (55.7); Ingvar Eriksson (55.9); Bo Westergren (56.1); Gunnar Larsson (56.2) | 3:43.9 | |
| 7 | Colombia | Julio Arango (56.0); Tomas Becerra (59.7); Federico Sicard (58.8); Ricardo González (57.0) | 3:51.5 | |
| 8 | El Salvador | Salvador Vilanova (55.9); Rubén Guerrero (1:05.9); José Alvarado (1:02.4); Ernesto Durón (1:04.1) | 4:08.3 | |

Heat 2

| Rank | Nation | Swimmers | Time | Notes |
|---|---|---|---|---|
| 1 | United States | William Johnson (54.5); David Johnson (53.1); Michael Wall (54.0); Don Schollander (53.8) | 3:35.4 | Q |
| 2 | Australia | Greg Rogers (55.3); Robert Cusack (55.7); Bob Windle (53.9); Mike Wenden (53.1) | 3:38.0 | Q |
| 3 | West Germany | Peter Schorning (55.1); Wolfgang Kremer (54.8); Olaf, Baron von Scholing (54.9); Hans Faßnacht (55.4) | 3:40.2 | Q |
| 4 | East Germany | Frank Wiegand (55.4); Horst-Günter Gregor (54.4); Udo Poser (55.0); Lothar Gericke (55.7) | 3:40.5 | Q |
| 5 | Hungary | Péter Lázár (56.0); István Szentirmay (56.0); Csaba Csatlós (55.9); Gábor Kucsera (54.5) | 3:42.4 | |
| 6 | Mexico | Salvador Ruíz (57.1); Mario Santibáñez (55.7); Eduardo Alanís (57.8); Rafaél Cal (55.5) | 3:46.1 | |
| 7 | Puerto Rico | Jorge González (55.0); Michael Goodner (1:00.4); Gary Goodner (55.6); José Ferraioli (56.0) | 3:47.0 | |
| 8 | Philippines | Roosevelt Abdulgafur (59.7); Alman Jaamani (54.8); Tony Asamali (57.9); Luis Ayesa (55.4) | 3:47.8 | |

=== Final ===
| Rank | Nation | Swimmers | Time | Notes |
|---|---|---|---|---|
| 1st place, gold medalist(s) | United States | Zac Zorn (53.4); Stephen Rerych (52.8); Mark Spitz (52.7); Ken Walsh (52.8) | 3:31.7 | |
| 2nd place, silver medalist(s) | Soviet Union | Semyon Belits-Geiman (54.7); Viktor Mazanov (54.0); Georgijs Kuļikovs (52.9); Leonid Ilyichov (52.6) | 3:34.2 | |
| 3rd place, bronze medalist(s) | Australia | Greg Rogers (55.2); Robert Cusack (54.1); Bob Windle (53.7); Mike Wenden (51.7) | 3:34.7 | |
| 4 | Great Britain | Mike Turner (55.5); Bobby McGregor (54.2); David Hembrow (55.4); Tony Jarvis (53.3) | 3:38.4 | |
| 5 | East Germany | Frank Wiegand (54.3); Horst-Günter Gregor (54.3); Udo Poser (55.4); Lothar Gericke (54.8) | 3:38.8 | |
| 6 | West Germany | Peter Schorning (54.5); Wolfgang Kremer (55.2); Olaf, Baron von Scholing (54.7); Hans Faßnacht (54.6) | 3:39.0 | |
| 7 | Canada | Glen Finch (55.3); George Smith (55.3); Ralph Hutton (54.2); Sandy Gildchrist (54.4) | 3:39.2 | |
| 8 | Japan | Kunihiro Iwasaki (55.3); Masayuki Osawa (55.4); Satoru Nakano (55.9); Teruhiko Kitani (54.9) | 3:41.5 | |
