= Swimming at the 1968 Summer Olympics – Men's 100 metre freestyle =

Men's 100 metre freestyle at the Games of the XIX Olympiad
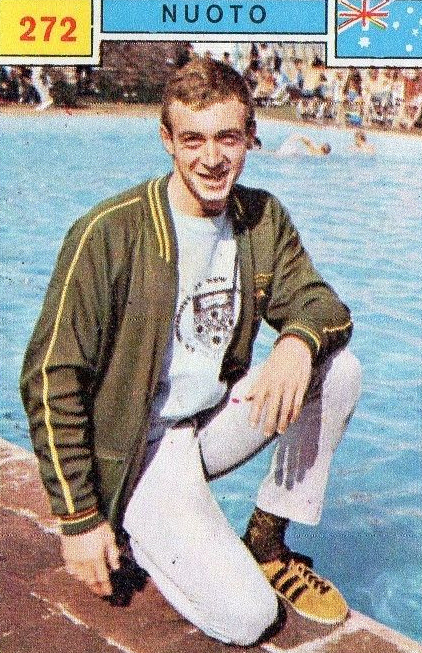
- Michael Wenden
- Venue: Alberca Olímpica Francisco Márquez
- Date: 18 October 1968 (heats & semifinals); 19 October 1968 (final)
- Competitors: 64 from 35 nations
- Winning time: 52.2 WR

Medalists
1st place, gold medalist(s)		Michael Wenden; Australia
2nd place, silver medalist(s)		Ken Walsh; United States
3rd place, bronze medalist(s)		Mark Spitz; United States

The men's 100 metre freestyle event at the 1968 Olympic Games took place between 18 and 19 October. There were 64 competitors from 34 nations. Nations had been limited to three swimmers each since the 1924 Games (except in 1960, when the limit was two). The event was won by Michael Wenden of Australia, the nation's third victory in four Games (tied for second-most all-time with Hungary behind the United States' eight). Americans Ken Walsh and Mark Spitz took silver and bronze, respectively.

== Background ==
This was the 15th appearance of the men's 100 metre freestyle. The event has been held at every Summer Olympics except 1900 (when the shortest freestyle was the 200 metres), though the 1904 version was measured in yards rather than metres.

One of the eight finalists from the 1964 Games returned: silver medalist Bobby McGregor of Great Britain. The favorite coming into the Games was Zac Zorn, who had matched the world record at the U.S. trials. However, Zorn had struggled the week before the competition with illness. His teammates, Ken Walsh (whose record it was that Zorn had tied) and young butterfly specialist Mark Spitz, were strong contenders, as was McGregor (who had won the European championship).

Barbados, Costa Rica, El Salvador, Ireland, Jamaica, Lebanon, and Trinidad and Tobago each made their debut in the event; West Germany competed separately for the first time. The United States made its 15th appearance, having competed at each edition of the event to date.

== Competition format ==
The competition used a three-round (heats, semifinals, final) format. The advancement rule followed the format introduced in 1952. A swimmer's place in the heat was not used to determine advancement; instead, the fastest times from across all heats in a round were used. There were 9 heats of between 6 and 8 swimmers each. The top 24 swimmers advanced to the semifinals. There were 3 semifinals of 8 swimmers each. The top 8 swimmers advanced to the final. Swim-offs were used as necessary to break ties.

This swimming event used freestyle swimming, which means that the method of the stroke is not regulated (unlike backstroke, breaststroke, and butterfly events). Nearly all swimmers use the front crawl or a variant of that stroke. Because an Olympic size swimming pool is 50 metres long, this race consisted of two lengths of the pool.

== Records ==
These were the standing world and Olympic records (in seconds) prior to the 1968 Summer Olympics.

World record	Ken Walsh (USA)	52.6	Winnipeg, Canada	27 July 1967
Olympic record	Don Schollander (USA)	53.4	Tokyo, Japan	12 October 1964

Zac Zorn matched the Olympic record in the second semifinal; Michael Wenden beat it in the third with 52.9 seconds. Wenden dropped the record again, to 52.2 seconds, in the final; all three medalists beat the old record time.

== Schedule ==
All times are Central Standard Time (UTC-6)

Date	Time	Round
Friday, 18 October 1968	10:00; 17:00	Heats; Semifinals
Saturday, 19 October 1968	17:00	Final

== Results ==
=== Heats ===
There were 9 heats in this category. The 24 fastest swimmers from the heats advanced to the semifinals.

Rank	Heat	Swimmer	Nation	Time	Notes
1	8	Mike Wenden	Australia	53.6	Q
2	4	Zac Zorn	United States	54.2	Q
3	7	Georgijs Kuļikovs	Soviet Union	54.3	Q
4	2	Luis Nicolao	Argentina	54.6	Q
4	5	Mark Spitz	United States	54.6	Q
6	6	Sergey Gusev	Soviet Union	54.8	Q
6	8	Bob Windle	Australia	54.8	Q
8	5	José Antonio Chicoy	Spain	54.9	Q
8	3	Leonid Ilyichov	Soviet Union	54.9	Q
8	1	Michel Rousseau	France	54.9	Q
11	4	Wolfgang Kremer	West Germany	55.0	Q
12	4	Gábor Kucsera	Hungary	55.1	Q
12	2	Bobby McGregor	Great Britain	55.1	Q
14	1	Lester Eriksson	Sweden	55.2	Q
15	6	John Gilchrist	Canada	55.4	Q
15	2	Greg Rogers	Australia	55.4	Q
17	3	Kunihiro Iwasaki	Japan	55.5	Q
17	5	François Simons	Belgium	55.5	Q
19	7	Pietro Boscaini	Italy	55.7	Q
19	3	Gary Goodner	Puerto Rico	55.7	Q
19	9	Ken Walsh	United States	55.7	Q
22	5	Roosevelt Abdulgafur	Philippines	55.8	Q
22	8	Michael Turner	Great Britain	55.8	Q
22	7	Olaf, Baron von Schilling	West Germany	55.8	Q
25	8	Glen Finch	Canada	56.0	
26	8	José Ferraioli	Puerto Rico	56.1	
27	7	Luis Ayesa	Philippines	56.2	
27	1	Bernard Gruener	France	56.2	
27	1	Pano Capéronis	Switzerland	56.2	
30	1	Ørjan Madsen	Norway	56.3	
31	7	Salvador Ruiz	Mexico	56.4	
31	5	Carlos van der Maath	Argentina	56.4	
33	3	Rafaél Cal	Mexico	56.5	
33	9	Anthony Jarvis	Great Britain	56.5	
33	9	Masayuki Osawa	Japan	56.5	
36	4	Csaba Csatlós	Hungary	56.6	
37	2	José Aranha	Brazil	56.8	
38	9	Peter Schorning	West Germany	56.9	
39	8	Ricardo González	Colombia	57.0	
39	2	Mario Santibáñez	Mexico	57.0	
41	3	Peter Schmid	Austria	57.1	
42	9	Amnon Krauz	Israel	57.2	
42	9	Gérard Letast	France	57.2	
44	6	Michele D'Oppido	Italy	57.3	
45	4	Herman Verbauwen	Belgium	57.5	
46	3	Ronnie Wong	Hong Kong	58.0	
47	5	Angus Edghill	Barbados	58.1	
48	6	Gregorio Fiallo	Cuba	58.2	
48	5	Michael Goodner	Puerto Rico	58.2	
50	9	Guðmundur Gíslason	Iceland	58.6	
50	3	Fernando González	Ecuador	58.6	
52	6	Geoffrey Ferreira	Trinidad and Tobago	58.9	
53	7	Paul Nash	Jamaica	59.0	
53	4	Federico Sicard	Colombia	59.0	
55	1	Donnacha O'Dea	Ireland	59.5	
56	5	Salvador Vilanova	El Salvador	59.6	
57	7	José Martínez	Cuba	1:00.4	
58	4	Yacoub Masboungi	Lebanon	1:00.5	
59	2	Andrew Loh	Hong Kong	1:00.7	
60	1	Lee Tong-shing	Taiwan	1:01.0	
61	6	Robert Loh	Hong Kong	1:01.1	
62	1	José Alvarado	El Salvador	1:02.0	
63	9	Ernesto Durón	El Salvador	1:03.8	
64	2	Luis Aguilar	Costa Rica	1:04.5	

=== Semifinals ===
The 8 fastest swimmers advanced to the final. Zorn matched the previous Olympic record of 53.4 seconds in semifinal 2 before Wenden broke that record with a 52.9 second time in semifinal 3.

Rank	Heat	Swimmer	Nation	Time	Notes
1	3	Mike Wenden	Australia	52.9	Q, OR
2	2	Zac Zorn	United States	53.4	Q, =OR
3	1	Leonid Ilyichov	Soviet Union	53.8	Q
3	1	Bobby McGregor	Great Britain	53.8	Q
3	2	Luis Nicolao	Argentina	53.8	Q
3	3	Mark Spitz	United States	53.8	Q
7	2	Ken Walsh	United States	53.9	Q
8	1	Georgijs Kuļikovs	Soviet Union	54.1	Q
9	2	Wolfgang Kremer	West Germany	54.3	
10	3	Michel Rousseau	France	54.5	
11	3	Bob Windle	Australia	54.6	
12	3	John Gilchrist	Canada	54.8	
13	1	Greg Rogers	Australia	54.9	
13	2	José Antonio Chicoy	Spain	54.9	
13	2	Lester Eriksson	Sweden	54.9	
16	3	Gábor Kucsera	Hungary	55.0	
17	1	Sergey Gusev	Soviet Union	55.2	
18	2	François Simons	Belgium	55.3	
19	3	Pietro Boscaini	Italy	55.6	
19	3	Michael Turner	Great Britain	55.6	
21	1	Gary Goodner	Puerto Rico	55.8	
21	1	Kunihiro Iwasaki	Japan	55.8	
23	2	Roosevelt Abdulgafur	Philippines	55.9	
23	1	Olaf, Baron von Schilling	West Germany	55.9	

=== Final ===
Zorn lead the field at the 50 metre turn, but weakened by a week long illness, faded and finished last.

Rank	Swimmer	Nation	Time	Notes
1st place, gold medalist(s)	Mike Wenden	Australia	52.2	WR
2nd place, silver medalist(s)	Ken Walsh	United States	52.8	
3rd place, bronze medalist(s)	Mark Spitz	United States	53.0	
4	Bobby McGregor	Great Britain	53.5	
5	Leonid Ilyichov	Soviet Union	53.8	
6	Georgijs Kuļikovs	Soviet Union	53.8	
7	Luis Nicolao	Argentina	53.9	
8	Zac Zorn	United States	53.9	
