= Swimming at the 1968 Summer Olympics – Men's 200 metre freestyle =

Men's 200 metre freestyle at the Games of the XIX Olympiad
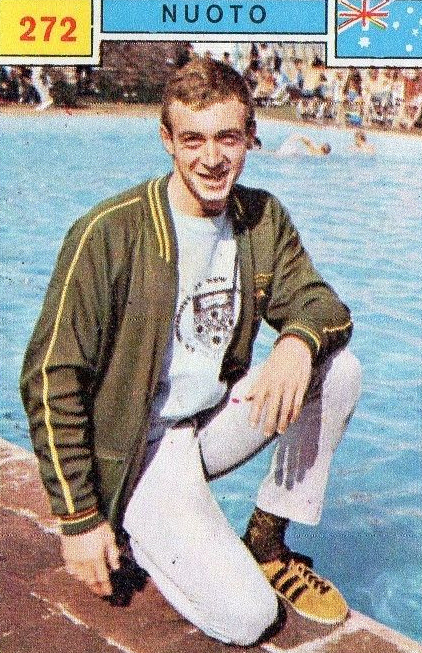
- Gold medalist Michael Wenden
- Venue: Alberca Olímpica Francisco Márquez
- Date: 24 October 1968 (heats & final)
- Competitors: 57 from 26 nations
- Winning time: 1:55.2 OR

Medalists
1st place, gold medalist(s)		Michael Wenden	Australia
2nd place, silver medalist(s)		Don Schollander	United States
3rd place, bronze medalist(s)		John Nelson	United States

The men's 200 metre freestyle event at the 1968 Olympic Games took place on 24 October at the Alberca Olímpica Francisco Márquez. It was the third time the event was held, returning for the first time since 1904 (when the distance was measured in yards). There were 57 competitors from 26 nations, with each nation having up to three swimmers. The event was won by Michael Wenden of Australia, the nation's second victory in the event (68 years, but only two Games, apart); Australia extended its podium streak in the event to three Games over 68 years. It was Wenden's second gold medal of the Games, completing a 100/200 free double. Americans Don Schollander and John Nelson took silver and bronze, respectively (with the United States podium streak thereby being two Games over 64 years).

== Background ==
This was the third appearance of the 200 metre freestyle event. It was first contested in 1900. It would be contested a second time, though at 220 yards, in 1904. After that, the event did not return until 1968; since then, it has been on the programme at every Summer Games.

Unsurprisingly, none of the competitors from the 1904 Games returned. Don Schollander was the heavy favourite in the event, having broken the world record five times since Tokyo 1964 (the last Games without the 200 metre freestyle on the programme). Schollander had won four Olympic gold medals in 1964, including anchoring the gold medal 4 × 200 metre freestyle relay. Michael Wenden of Australia had won the 100 metre freestyle (in which Schollander did not compete) earlier at the 1968 Olympics and was looking for a double.

19 of the 26 competing nations were making their debut in the event. Australia and the United States were the only two nations to have previously competed in both 1900 and 1904; France, Great Britain, Hungary, the Netherlands, and Sweden were making their second appearance after competing in 1900 only.

== Competition format ==
The competition used a two-round (heats, final) format. The advancement rule followed the format introduced in 1952. A swimmer's place in the heat was not used to determine advancement; instead, the fastest times from across all heats in a round were used. There were 9 heats of between 5 and 8 swimmers each. The top 8 swimmers advanced to the final. Swim-offs were used as necessary to break ties.

This swimming event used freestyle swimming, which means that the method of the stroke is not regulated (unlike backstroke, breaststroke, and butterfly events). Nearly all swimmers use the front crawl or a variant of that stroke. Because an Olympic size swimming pool is 50 metres long, this race consisted of four lengths of the pool.

== Records ==
The standing world and Olympic records prior to this competition were as follows. Clark's Olympic record was set as the first leg in the 4 × 200 metre freestyle relay final.

World record	Don Schollander (USA)	1:54.3	Long Beach, United States	30 August 1968
Olympic record	Steve Clark (USA)	2:00.0	Tokyo, Japan	18 October 1964

John Nelson set a new Olympic record at 1:59.5 in the first heat; Michael Wenden immediately broke it with 1:59.3 in the second. In the fourth and eighth heats, Don Schollander and Ralph Hutton tied the old record (behind Nelson and Wenden's new efforts).

Five of the finalists came in below the new record; Wenden finished first to improve his Olympic record to 1:55.2.

== Schedule ==
All times are Central Standard Time (UTC-6)

Date	Time	Round
Thursday, 24 October 1968	10:00; 17:00	Heats; Final

== Results ==
=== Heats ===
Nelson set a new Olympic record in the first heat; it was short-lived, as Wenden broke it in the second.

Rank	Heat	Swimmer	Nation	Time	Note
1	2	Michael Wenden	Australia	1:59.3	Q, OR
2	1	John Nelson	United States	1:59.5	Q, OR
3	8	Ralph Hutton	Canada	2:00.0	Q
3	4	Don Schollander	United States	2:00.0	Q
5	6	Alain Mosconi	France	2:00.1	Q
6	5	Steve Rerych	United States	2:00.6	Q
7	2	Bob Windle	Australia	2:01.0	Q
8	5	Semyon Belits-Geyman	Soviet Union	2:01.2	Q
9	7	Juan Carlos Bello	Peru	2:01.3	
9	6	Leonid Ilyichov	Soviet Union	2:01.3	
11	9	Michel Rousseau	France	2:01.5	
12	8	Olaf, Baron von Schilling	West Germany	2:01.7	
13	4	Luis Nicolao	Argentina	2:01.8	
13	3	Sandy Gilchrist	Canada	2:01.8	
15	3	Lester Eriksson	Sweden	2:02.1	
15	9	Kunihiro Iwasaki	Japan	2:02.1	
15	1	Wolfgang Kremer	West Germany	2:02.1	
18	1	Mark Anderson	Australia	2:02.2	
19	3	Gilles Moreau	France	2:02.7	
20	7	Julio Arango	Colombia	2:03.1	
21	6	George Smith	Canada	2:03.2	
22	1	Noboru Waseda	Japan	2:03.4	
23	4	Johan Schans	Netherlands	2:04.1	
24	6	Roosevelt Abdulgafur	Philippines	2:04.8	
25	5	Pano Capéronis	Switzerland	2:04.9	
25	4	Gunnar Larsson	Sweden	2:04.9	
27	5	Ørjan Madsen	Norway	2:05.4	
28	3	Satoru Nakano	Japan	2:05.5	
29	4	Elt Drenth	Netherlands	2:05.6	
30	5	Ricardo González	Colombia	2:05.8	
31	2	Władysław Wojtakajtis	Poland	2:06.0	
32	8	Tony Asamali	Philippines	2:06.2	
33	7	Zbigniew Pacelt	Poland	2:06.3	
34	2	Mátyás Borlói	Hungary	2:06.5	
35	1	Gary Goodner	Puerto Rico	2:06.6	
35	9	Aad Oudt	Netherlands	2:06.6	
37	6	Fernando González	Ecuador	2:07.3	
38	6	Werner Krammel	West Germany	2:07.9	
39	4	Georgijs Kuļikovs	Soviet Union	2:08.3	
40	7	Jorge González	Puerto Rico	2:09.1	
41	2	Amnon Krauz	Israel	2:09.3	
41	5	Tony Jarvis	Great Britain	2:09.3	
43	7	Csaba Csatlós	Hungary	2:10.0	
43	8	Ingvar Eriksson	Sweden	2:10.0	
45	2	Gregorio Fiallo	Cuba	2:10.5	
46	3	Federico Sicard	Colombia	2:11.1	
47	6	Ramiro Benavides	Guatemala	2:11.7	
48	9	Luis Ayesa	Philippines	2:12.2	
49	7	Gábor Kucsera	Hungary	2:12.8	
50	1	Salvador Vilanova	El Salvador	2:14.6	
51	4	Ronnie Wong	Hong Kong	2:15.0	
52	8	Andrew Loh	Hong Kong	2:15.8	
53	3	José Martínez	Cuba	2:16.1	
54	5	Bob Loh	Hong Kong	2:16.2	
55	4	Angus Edghill	Barbados	2:19.1	
56	6	José Alvarado	El Salvador	2:20.2	
57	9	Ernesto Durón	El Salvador	2:24.1	
—	1	Guillermo Echevarría	Mexico	DNS	
—	2	Michele D'Oppido	Italy	DNS	
—	3	Michael Turner	Great Britain	DNS	
—	5	Edgar Miranda Villalobos	Costa Rica	DNS	
—	7	José Aranha	Brazil	DNS	
—	7	Udo Poser	East Germany	DNS	
—	8	John Thurley	Great Britain	DNS	
—	8	Salvador Ruiz	Mexico	DNS	
—	8	José Ferraioli	Puerto Rico	DNS	
—	9	Carlos van der Maath	Argentina	DNS	
—	9	Pietro Boscaini	Italy	DNS	

=== Final ===
Rank	Swimmer	Nation	Time	Notes
1st place, gold medalist(s)	Michael Wenden	Australia	1:55.2	OR
2nd place, silver medalist(s)	Don Schollander	United States	1:55.8	
3rd place, bronze medalist(s)	John Nelson	United States	1:58.1	
4	Ralph Hutton	Canada	1:58.6	
5	Alain Mosconi	France	1:59.1	
6	Bob Windle	Australia	2:00.9	
7	Semyon Belits-Geiman	Soviet Union	2:01.5	
—	Steve Rerych	United States	DNS	
