= Luis Aguilar =

Luis Aguilar may refer to:

- Luis Aguilar (actor) (1918–1997), Mexican actor and singer
- Luis Aguilar (sailor) (born 1936), Mexican sailor
- Luis Aguilar Monsalve (born 1942), Ecuadorian writer and academic
- Luis Aguilar (swimmer) (born 1952), Costa Rican swimmer
- Luis A. Aguilar (born 1953), American lawyer and former U.S. government official
- Luis Aguilar (writer) (1969–2022), Mexican poet, essayist, narrator, and translator
- Luis Aguilar (soccer) (born 1984), American soccer defender
