= World record progression 100 metres freestyle =

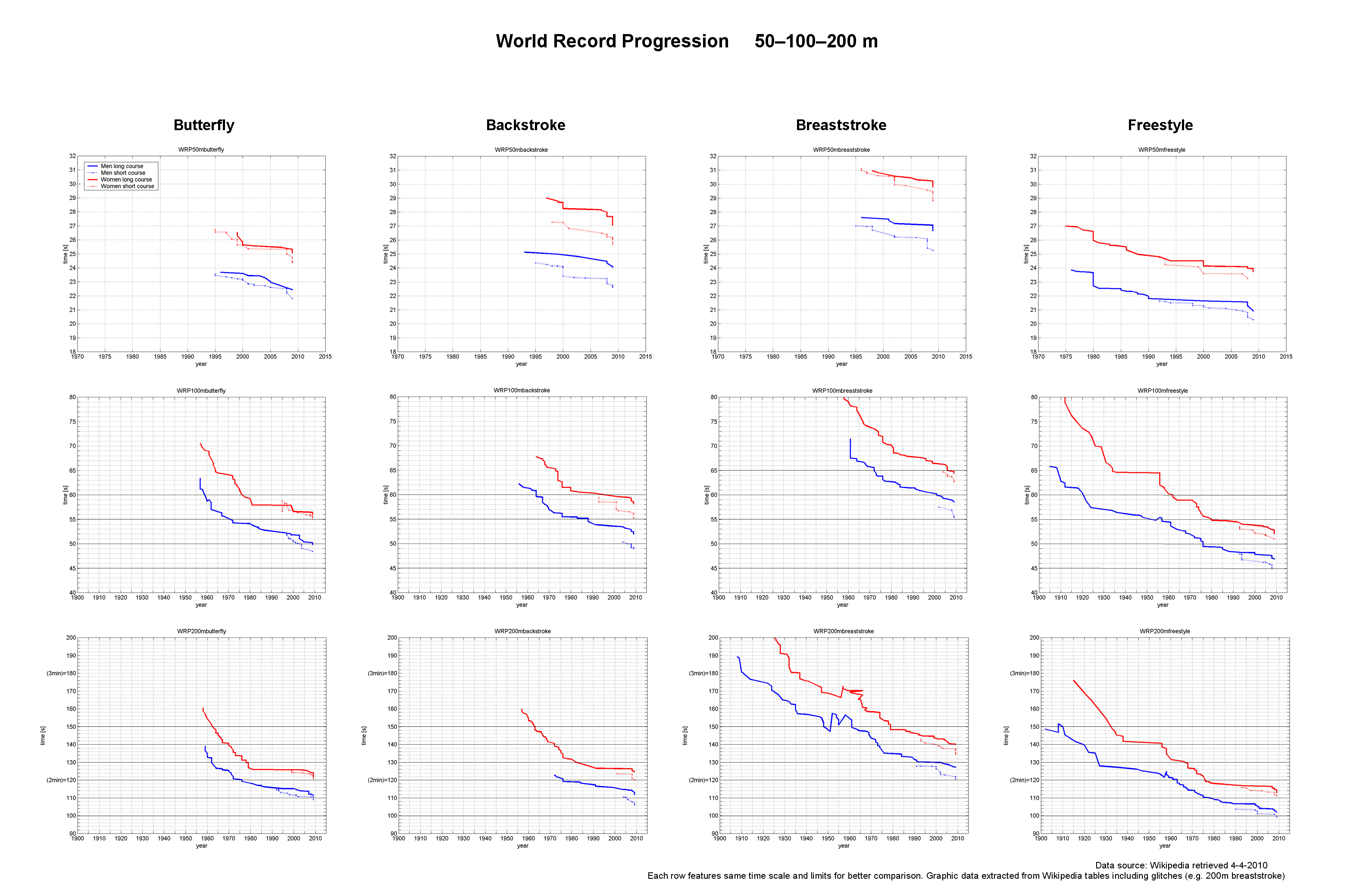
Graphic data for World Record Progression in Men and Women Swimming 50m-100m-200m Long and Short Course Butterfly-Backstroke-Breaststroke-Freestyle

The first world record in the 100 metres freestyle in long course (50 metres) swimming was recognised by the International Swimming Federation (FINA) in 1905. In the short course (25 metres) swimming events, the world's governing body recognizes world records since 3 March 1991.

Times have consistently dropped over the years due to better training techniques, new developments in the sport and swimwear changes (e.g. goggles were not widely used until the 1970s, providing for considerable expansion of practice/training time).

In the first four Olympics, competitions were not held in pools, but rather in open water (1896 – The Mediterranean Sea, 1900 – The Seine River, 1904 – an artificial lake, 1906 – The Mediterranean Sea). The 1904 Olympics freestyle race was the only one ever measured at 100 yards, instead of the usual 100 metres. A 100-metre pool was built for the 1908 Olympics and sat in the centre of the main stadium's track and field oval. The 1912 Olympics, held in the Stockholm harbour, marked the beginning of electronic timing.

Male swimmers wore full body suits up until the 1940s, which caused more drag in the water than their modern swim-wear counterparts. Also, over the years, pool designs have lessened the drag. Some design considerations allow for the reduction of swimming resistance making the pool faster. Namely, proper pool depth, elimination of currents, increased lane width, energy absorbing racing lane lines and gutters, and the use of other innovative hydraulic, acoustic and illumination designs.

In 2008, leading up to the Olympics, Speedo introduced a 50% Polyurethane suit dubbed LZR. Pure polyurethane suits from Arena (X-Glide), Adidas (Hydrofoil) and Italian suit manufacturer, Jaked were thought to be largely responsible for the multiple World Records in 2009 including at the 2009 World Aquatics Championships (dubbed the "Plastic Games" by Karen Crouse in the New York Times). FINA announced a ban on non-textile suits that took effect in January 2010.

The 1924 Summer Olympics were the first to use the standard 50 metre pool with marked lanes. In the freestyle, swimmers originally dived from the pool walls, but diving blocks were eventually incorporated at the 1936 Summer Olympics. The tumble turn ("flip-turn") was developed by the 1950s.

== Men ==
=== Long course ===
| # | Time | | Name | Nationality | Date | Meet | Location | Ref |
|---|---|---|---|---|---|---|---|---|
| 1 | 1:05.8 | | Zoltán Halmay | Hungary | 3 December 1905 | – | Vienna, Austria | |
| 2 | 1:05.6 | | Charles Daniels | United States | 20 July 1908 | Olympic Games | London, United Kingdom | |
| 3 | 1:02.8 | tt | Charles Daniels | United States | 15 April 1910 | Special record attempt by the New York AC | New York City, United States | |
| 4 | 1:02.4 | | Kurt Bretting | Germany | 6 April 1912 | – | Brussels, Belgium | |
| 5 | 1:01.6 | | Duke Kahanamoku | United States | 20 July 1912 | German Championships | Hamburg, Germany | |
| 6 | 1:01.4 | | Duke Kahanamoku | United States | 9 August 1918 | International exhibition | New York City, United States | |
| 7 | 1:00.4 | | Duke Kahanamoku | United States | 24 August 1920 | Olympic Games | Antwerp, Belgium | |
| 8 | 58.6 | | Johnny Weissmuller | United States | 9 July 1922 | – | Alameda, United States | |
| 9 | 57.4 | | Johnny Weissmuller | United States | 17 February 1924 | – | Miami, United States | |
| 10 | 56.8 | | Peter Fick | United States | 2 March 1934 | Yale University Swimming Carnival | New Haven, United States | |
| 11 | 56.6 | tt | Peter Fick | United States | 5 March 1935 | Yale University Swimming Carnival | New Haven, United States | |
| 12 | 56.4 | | Peter Fick | United States | 11 February 1936 | Yale Benefit Event for the US Olympic team | New Haven, United States | |
| 13 | 55.9 | tt | Alan Ford | United States | 13 April 1944 | Special record attempt | New Haven, United States | |
| 14 | 55.8 | | Alex Jany | France | 15 September 1947 | – | Menton, France | |
| 15 | 55.4 | tt | Alan Ford | United States | 29 June 1948 | New Haven Swim Club team time trial | New Haven, United States | |
| 16 | 54.8 | tt | Dick Cleveland | United States | 1 April 1954 | AAU Championships | New Haven, United States | |
| 17 | 55.4 | | Jon Henricks | Australia | 30 November 1956 | Olympic Games | Melbourne, Australia | |
| 18 | 55.2 | | John Devitt | Australia | 19 January 1957 | New South Wales State Championships | Sydney, Australia | |
| 19 | 54.6 | | John Devitt | Australia | 28 January 1957 | Queensland State Championships | Brisbane, Australia | |
| 20 | 54.4 | | Steve Clark | United States | 18 August 1961 | Men's NAAA Championships | Los Angeles, United States | |
| 21 | 53.6 | tt | Manuel dos Santos | Brazil | 20 September 1961 | Special record attempt by the CR Guanabara | Rio de Janeiro, Brazil | |
| 22 | 52.9 | | Alain Gottvallès | France | 13 September 1964 | – | Budapest, Hungary | |
| 22 | 52.9 | =, r | Steve Clark | United States | 14 October 1964 | Olympic Games | Tokyo, Japan | |
| 24 | 52.6 | r | Ken Walsh | United States | 27 July 1967 | Pan American Games | Winnipeg, Canada | |
| 24 | 52.6 | = | Zac Zorn | United States | 2 September 1968 | US Olympic Trials (elec. 52.58) | Los Angeles, United States | |
| 26 | 52.2 | | Michael Wenden | Australia | 19 October 1968 | Olympic Games | Mexico City, Mexico | |
| 27 | 51.94 | h | Mark Spitz | United States | 23 August 1970 | AAU Championships | Los Angeles, United States | |
| 28 | 51.47 | h | Mark Spitz | United States | 5 August 1972 | USA Olympic Trials | Chicago, United States | |
| 29 | 51.22 | | Mark Spitz | United States | 3 September 1972 | Olympic Games | Munich, West Germany | |
| 30 | 51.12 | h | Jim Montgomery | United States | 21 June 1975 | AAU World Championship Trials | Long Beach, United States | |
| 31 | 51.11 | | Andy Coan | United States | 3 August 1975 | An Amateur Athletic Union Region Four meet | Fort Lauderdale, United States | |
| 32 | 50.59 | sf | Jim Montgomery | United States | 23 August 1975 | AAU Championships | Kansas City, United States | |
| 33 | 50.39 | sf | Jim Montgomery | United States | 24 July 1976 | Olympic Games | Montreal, Canada | |
| 34 | 49.99 | | Jim Montgomery | United States | 25 July 1976 | Olympic Games | Montreal, Canada | |
| 35 | 49.44 | | Jonty Skinner | South Africa | 14 August 1976 | AAU Championships | Philadelphia, United States | |
| 36 | 49.36 | tt | Rowdy Gaines | United States | 3 April 1981 | Longhorn Invitational | Austin, United States | |
| 37 | 49.24 | h | Matt Biondi | United States | 6 August 1985 | USA Summer Nationals | Mission Viejo, United States | |
| 38 | 48.95 | | Matt Biondi | United States | 6 August 1985 | USA Summer Nationals | Mission Viejo, United States | |
| 39 | 48.74 | | Matt Biondi | United States | 24 June 1986 | US World Championships Trials | Orlando, United States | |
| 40 | 48.42 | | Matt Biondi | United States | 10 August 1988 | USA Olympic Trials | Austin, United States | |
| 41 | 48.21 | | Alexander Popov | Russia | 18 June 1994 | Mare Nostrum | Monte-Carlo, Monaco | |
| 42 | 48.18 | r | Michael Klim | Australia | 16 September 2000 | Olympic Games | Sydney, Australia | |
| 43 | 47.84 | sf | Pieter van den Hoogenband | Netherlands | 19 September 2000 | Olympic Games | Sydney, Australia | |
| 44 | 47.60 | sf | Alain Bernard | France | 21 March 2008 | European Championships | Eindhoven, Netherlands | |
| 45 | 47.50 | | Alain Bernard | France | 22 March 2008 | European Championships | Eindhoven, Netherlands | |
| 46 | 47.24 | r | Eamon Sullivan | Australia | 11 August 2008 | Olympic Games | Beijing, China | |
| 47 | 47.20 | sf | Alain Bernard | France | 13 August 2008 | Olympic Games | Beijing, China | |
| 48 | 47.05 | sf | Eamon Sullivan | Australia | 13 August 2008 | Olympic Games | Beijing, China | |
| - | 46.94 | sf, * | Alain Bernard | France | 23 April 2009 | French Championships | Montpellier, France | |
| 49 | 46.91 | | César Cielo | Brazil | 30 July 2009 | World Championships | Rome, Italy | |
| 50 | 46.86 | | David Popovici | Romania | 13 August 2022 | European Championships | Rome, Italy | |
| 51 | 46.80 | r | Pan Zhanle | China | 11 February 2024 | World Championships | Doha, Qatar | |
| 52 | 46.40 | | Pan Zhanle | China | 31 July 2024 | Olympic Games | Paris, France | |

* Swim was never ratified by FINA as a world record since Bernard wore an unapproved swimsuit.

=== Short course ===
| # | Time | | Name | Nationality | Date | Meet | Location | Ref |
|---|---|---|---|---|---|---|---|---|
| WB | 48.20 | | Michael Gross | West Germany | 11 Feb 1988 | ? | Offenbach, Germany | |
| 1 | 47.94 | | Gustavo Borges | Brazil | 2 Jul 1993 | Brazilian Championships | Santos, São Paulo, Brazil | |
| 2 | 47.83 | | Alexander Popov | Russia | 1 Jan 1994 | World Cup | Hong Kong, Hong Kong | |
| 3 | 47.82 | | Alexander Popov | Russia | 5 Jan 1994 | World Cup | Beijing, China | |
| 4 | 47.12 | | Alexander Popov | Russia | 12 Mar 1994 | World Cup | Desenzano del Garda, Italy | |
| 5 | 46.74 | | Alexander Popov | Russia | 19 Mar 1994 | World Cup | Gelsenkirchen, Germany | |
| 6 | 46.25 | | Ian Crocker | United States | 27 Mar 2004 | NCAA Men's Division I Championships | East Meadow, United States | |
| 6 | 46.25 | e | Roland Schoeman | South Africa | 22 Jan 2005 | World Cup | Berlin, Germany | |
| 8 | 45.83 | | Stefan Nystrand | Sweden | 17 Nov 2007 | World Cup | Berlin, Germany | |
| 9 | 45.69 | | Alain Bernard | France | 7 December 2008 | French Championships | Angers, France | |
| 10 | 45.12 | sf | Amaury Leveaux | France | 12 Dec 2008 | European Championships | Rijeka, Croatia | |
| 11 | 44.94 | | Amaury Leveaux | France | 13 Dec 2008 | European Championships | Rijeka, Croatia | |
| 12 | 44.84 | | Kyle Chalmers | Australia | 29 October 2021 | World Cup | Kazan, Russia | |
| 12 | 44.84 | e | Egor Kornev | Russia | 2 October 2026 | World Cup | Baku, Azerbaijan | |
| 14 | 44.64 | # | Jack Alexy | United States | 30 October 2026 | USA World Championship trials | Westmont, United States | |

== Women ==
=== Long course ===
| # | Time | | Name | Nationality | Date | Meet | Location | Ref |
|---|---|---|---|---|---|---|---|---|
| 1 | 1:35.0 | | Martha Gerstung | Germany | 18 October 1908 | – | Magdeburg, Germany | |
| 2 | 1:26.6 | | Claire Guttenstein | Belgium | 2 October 1910 | – | Schaerbeek, Belgium | |
| 3 | 1:24.6 | | Daisy Curwen | Great Britain | 29 September 1911 | – | Liverpool, United Kingdom | |
| 4 | 1:20.6 | | Daisy Curwen | Great Britain | 10 June 1912 | – | Birkenhead, United Kingdom | |
| 5 | 1:19.8 | | Fanny Durack | Australia | 9 July 1912 | Olympic Games | Stockholm, Sweden | |
| 6 | 1:18.8 | | Fanny Durack | Australia | 21 July 1912 | German Championships | Hamburg, Germany | |
| 7 | 1:16.2 | | Fanny Durack | Australia | 6 February 1915 | NSW Ladies' Amateur Championships | Sydney, Australia | |
| 8 | 1:14.4 | sf | Ethelda Bleibtrey | United States | 23 August 1920 | Olympic Games | Antwerp, Belgium | |
| 9 | 1:13.6 | | Ethelda Bleibtrey | United States | 25 August 1920 | Olympic Games | Antwerp, Belgium | |
| 10 | 1:12.8 | | Gertrude Ederle | United States | 30 June 1923 | – | Newark, United States | |
| 11 | 1:12.2 | h | Mariechen Wehselau | United States | 19 July 1924 | Olympic Games | Paris, France | |
| 12 | 1:10.0 | | Ethel Lackie | United States | 28 January 1926 | – | Toledo, United States | |
| 13 | 1:09.8 | | Eleanor Garatti | United States | 7 August 1929 | US National Women's Championships | Honolulu, Hawaii | |
| 14 | 1:09.4 | | Albina Osipowich | United States | 25 August 1929 | – | San Francisco, United States | |
| 15 | 1:08.0 | | Helene Madison | United States | 14 March 1930 | US National Championships | Miami Beach, United States | |
| 16 | 1:06.6 | | Helene Madison | United States | 20 April 1931 | – | Boston, United States | |
| 17 | 1:06.0 | | Willy den Ouden | Netherlands | 9 July 1933 | – | Antwerp, Belgium | |
| 18 | 1:05.4 | | Willy den Ouden | Netherlands | 24 February 1934 | – | Amsterdam, Netherlands | |
| 19 | 1:04.8 | | Willy den Ouden | Netherlands | 15 April 1934 | – | Rotterdam, Netherlands | |
| 20 | 1:04.6 | | Willy den Ouden | Netherlands | 27 February 1936 | – | Amsterdam, Netherlands | |
| 21 | 1:04.5 | | Dawn Fraser | Australia | 21 February 1956 | Australian Championships | Sydney, Australia | |
| 22 | 1:04.2 | | Cocky Gastelaars | Netherlands | 3 March 1956 | – | Amsterdam, Netherlands | |
| 23 | 1:04.0 | | Cocky Gastelaars | Netherlands | 14 April 1956 | – | Schiedam, Netherlands | |
| 24 | 1:03.3 | | Dawn Fraser | Australia | 25 August 1956 | Australian Olympic Squad Swimming Carnival | Townsville, Australia | |
| 25 | 1:03.2 | | Lorraine Crapp | Australia | 20 October 1956 | Australian Olympic Squad Swimming Carnival | Sydney, Australia | |
| 26 | 1:02.4 | | Lorraine Crapp | Australia | 25 October 1956 | Australian Trials | Melbourne, Australia | |
| 27 | 1:02.0 | | Dawn Fraser | Australia | 1 December 1956 | Olympic Games | Melbourne, Australia | |
| 28 | 1:01.5 | yd | Dawn Fraser | Australia | 18 February 1958 | Australian Championships | Melbourne, Australia | |
| 29 | 1:01.4 | yd | Dawn Fraser | Australia | 21 July 1958 | British Empire & Commonwealth Games | Cardiff, United Kingdom | |
| 30 | 1:01.2 | | Dawn Fraser | Australia | 10 August 1958 | – | Schiedam, Netherlands | |
| 31 | 1:00.2 | yd | Dawn Fraser | Australia | 23 February 1960 | Australian Championships | Sydney, Australia | |
| 32 | 1:00.0 | yd | Dawn Fraser | Australia | 23 October 1962 | Australian Trials | Melbourne, Australia | |
| 33 | 59.9 | yd | Dawn Fraser | Australia | 27 October 1962 | Australian Trials | Melbourne, Australia | |
| 34 | 59.5 | yd | Dawn Fraser | Australia | 24 October 1962 | British Empire & Commonwealth Games | Perth, Australia | |
| 35 | 58.9 | | Dawn Fraser | Australia | 29 February 1964 | Australian Championships | Sydney, Australia | |
| 35 | 58.9 | = | Shane Gould | Australia | 30 April 1971 | Coca-Cola International | London, United Kingdom | |
| 36 | 58.5 | | Shane Gould | Australia | 8 January 1972 | NSW Championships | Sydney, Australia | |
| 37 | 58.25 | | Kornelia Ender | East Germany | 13 July 1973 | East German Championships | East Berlin, East Germany | |
| 38 | 58.12 | | Kornelia Ender | East Germany | 18 August 1973 | – | Utrecht, Netherlands | |
| 39 | 57.61 | r | Kornelia Ender | East Germany | 8 September 1973 | World Championships | Belgrade, Yugoslavia | |
| 40 | 57.54 | | Kornelia Ender | East Germany | 9 September 1973 | World Championships | Belgrade, Yugoslavia | |
| 41 | 57.51 | | Kornelia Ender | East Germany | 4 July 1974 | East German Championships | Rostock, East Germany | |
| 42 | 56.96 | | Kornelia Ender | East Germany | 19 August 1974 | European Championships | Vienna, Austria | |
| 43 | 56.38 | | Kornelia Ender | East Germany | 14 March 1975 | GDRvURS Duel | Dresden, East Germany | |
| 44 | 56.22 | r | Kornelia Ender | East Germany | 26 July 1975 | World Championships | Cali, Colombia | |
| 45 | 55.73 | | Kornelia Ender | East Germany | 1 June 1976 | East German Championships | East Berlin, East Germany | |
| 46 | 55.65 | | Kornelia Ender | East Germany | 19 July 1976 | Olympic Games | Montréal, Canada | |
| 47 | 55.41 | | Barbara Krause | East Germany | 5 July 1978 | East German Championships | East Berlin, East Germany | |
| 48 | 54.98 | h | Barbara Krause | East Germany | 20 July 1980 | Olympic Games | Moscow, Soviet Union | |
| 49 | 54.79 | | Barbara Krause | East Germany | 21 July 1980 | Olympic Games | Moscow, Soviet Union | |
| 50 | 54.73 | r | Kristin Otto | East Germany | 19 August 1986 | World Championships | Madrid, Spain | |
| 51 | 54.48 | h | Jenny Thompson | United States | 1 March 1992 | US Olympic Trials | Indianapolis, United States | |
| 52 | 54.01 | | Jingyi Le | China | 5 September 1994 | World Championships | Rome, Italy | |
| 53 | 53.80 | | Inge de Bruijn | Netherlands | 28 May 2000 | Super Speedo Grand Prix | Sheffield, United Kingdom | |
| 54 | 53.77 | sf | Inge de Bruijn | Netherlands | 20 September 2000 | Olympic Games | Sydney, Australia | |
| 55 | 53.66 | sf | Libby Lenton | Australia | 31 March 2004 | Australian Championships | Sydney, Australia | |
| 56 | 53.52 | sf | Jodie Henry | Australia | 18 August 2004 | Olympic Games | Athens, Greece | |
| 57 | 53.42 | sf | Libby Lenton | Australia | 31 January 2006 | Australian Championships | Melbourne, Australia | |
| 58 | 53.30 | | Britta Steffen | Germany | 2 August 2006 | European Championships | Budapest, Hungary | |
| 59 | 52.88 | | Libby Trickett | Australia | 27 March 2008 | Australian Championships | Sydney, Australia | |
| 60 | 52.85 | h | Britta Steffen | Germany | 25 June 2009 | German Championships | Berlin, Germany | |
| 61 | 52.56 | | Britta Steffen | Germany | 27 June 2009 | German Championships | Berlin, Germany | |
| 62 | 52.22 | r | Britta Steffen | Germany | 26 July 2009 | World Championships | Rome, Italy | |
| 63 | 52.07 | | Britta Steffen | Germany | 31 July 2009 | World Championships | Rome, Italy | |
| 64 | 52.06 | | Cate Campbell | Australia | 2 July 2016 | Swimming Australia Grand Prix | Brisbane, Australia | |
| 65 | 51.71 | r | Sarah Sjöström | Sweden | 23 July 2017 | World Championships | Budapest, Hungary | |
| 65 | 51.68 | | Marrit Steenbergen | Netherlands | 27 June 2026 | Sette Colli Trophy | Rome, Italy | |

Legend: # – Record awaiting ratification by FINA; yd – set in a pool measured in yards; e – equalled existing record;
Records not set in finals: h – heat; sf – semifinal; r – relay 1st leg; rh – relay heat 1st leg; b – B final; † – en route to final mark; so – swim-off; tt – time trial

=== Short course ===
| # | Time | | Name | Nationality | Date | Meet | Location | Ref |
|---|---|---|---|---|---|---|---|---|
| 1 | 53.48 | | Livia Copariu | Romania | 6 April 1989 | Romanian National Championships | Bukarest, Romania | |
| 2 | 53.46 | | Franziska van Almsick | Germany | 6 January 1993 | World Cup | Shanghai, China | |
| 3 | 53.33 | | Franziska van Almsick | Germany | 10 January 1993 | World Cup | Beijing, China | |
| 4 | 53.01 | | Jingyi Le | China | 2 December 1993 | World Championships | Palma de Mallorca, Spain | |
| 5 | 52.80 | | Therese Alshammar | Sweden | 10 December 1999 | European Championships | Lisbon, Portugal | |
| 6 | 52.17 | | Therese Alshammar | Sweden | 17 March 2000 | World Championships | Athens, Greece | |
| 7 | 51.91 | sf | Libby Lenton | Australia | 8 August 2005 | Australian Championships | Melbourne, Australia | |
| 8 | 51.70 | | Libby Lenton | Australia | 9 August 2005 | Australian Championships | Melbourne, Australia | |
| 9 | 51.01 | | Libby Trickett | Australia | 10 August 2009 | Australian Championships | Hobart, Australia | |
| 10 | 50.91 | † | Cate Campbell | Australia | 28 November 2015 | Australian Championships | Sydney, Australia | |
| 11 | 50.77 | | Sarah Sjöström | Sweden | 3 August 2017 | World Cup | Moscow, Russia | |
| 12 | 50.58 | | Sarah Sjöström | Sweden | 11 August 2017 | World Cup | Eindhoven, Netherlands | link |
| 13 | 50.25 | | Cate Campbell | Australia | 26 October 2017 | Australian Championships | Adelaide, Australia | link |
| 14 | 50.19 | | Kate Douglass | United States | 19 October 2025 | World Cup | Westmont, United States | |
| 15 | 49.93 | | Kate Douglass | United States | 25 October 2025 | World Cup | Toronto, Canada | |
| 16 | 49.64 | # | Kate Douglass | United States | 31 October 2026 | USA World Championship trials | Westmont, United States | |

Legend: # – Record awaiting ratification by FINA; e – equalled existing record;
Records not set in finals: h – heat; sf – semifinal; r – relay 1st leg; rh – relay heat 1st leg; b – B final; † – en route to final mark; so – swim-off; tt – time trial
