= Gábor Kucsera =

Gábor Kucsera may refer to:

- Gábor Kucsera (swimmer) (1949–2015), Hungarian swimmer
- Gábor Kucsera (canoeist) (born 1982), Hungarian sprint canoeist
