= Sergey Gusev (disambiguation) =

- Sergei Gusev (born 1975), Russian ice hockey player
- Sergey Gusev (swimmer)
- Sergey Ivanovich Gusev (1874–1933), Russian/Soviet statesman and politician

== See also ==
- Serhiy Husyev, Ukrainian football player
