= Mark Anderson (swimmer) =

Australian swimmer

Personal information
- Nationality: Australian
- Born: 15 May 1952 (age 74)

Sport
- Sport: Swimming
- Strokes: freestyle

Mark Anderson (born 15 May 1952) is an Australian former swimmer. He competed in the men's 200 metre freestyle at the 1968 Summer Olympics.
