= Bernard Gruener =

French swimmer

Personal information
- Nationality: French
- Born: 9 May 1949 (age 77) Casablanca, Morocco

Sport
- Sport: Swimming

Bernard Gruener (born 9 May 1949) is a French former swimmer. He competed in the men's 100 metre freestyle at the 1968 Summer Olympics.
