= David Hembrow (swimmer) =

British swimmer

Personal information
- Born: 2 June 1947 (age 79) Taunton, England

Sport
- Sport: Swimming

David Hembrow (born 2 June 1947) is a British former swimmer. He competed in the men's 4 × 100 metre freestyle relay at the 1968 Summer Olympics.
