= Zac Zorn =

American swimmer (born 1947)

Zachary Zorn
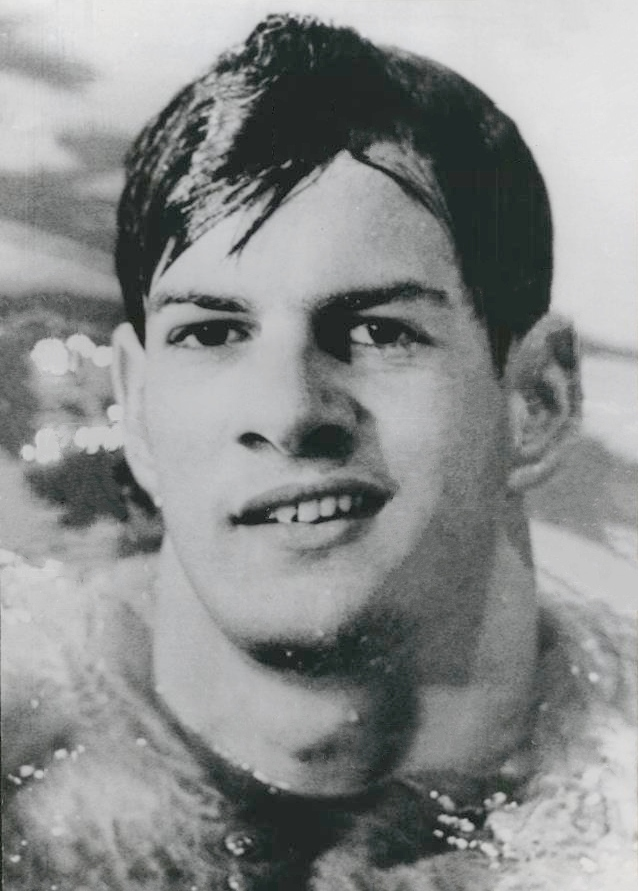
- Zorn at the 1967 Pan American Games

Personal information
- Full name: Zachary Zorn
- Nickname: "Zac"
- National team: United States
- Born: March 10, 1947 (age 79) Dayton, Ohio, U.S.
- Height: 6 ft 4 in (1.93 m)
- Weight: 190 lb (86 kg)

Sport
- Sport: Swimming
- Strokes: Freestyle
- Club: Phillips 66, Long Beach; Coach Don Gambril
- College team: UCLA Bruins
- Coach: Bob Horn (UCLA)
Medal record
Representing the United States
Olympic Games
Gold medal – first place	1968 Mexico City	4×100 m freestyle
Pan American Games
Silver medal – second place	1967 Winnipeg	100 m freestyle
Universiade
Gold medal – first place	1967 Tokyo	4×100 m freestyle
Bronze medal – third place	1967 Tokyo	100 m freestyle

Zachary Zorn (born March 10, 1947) is an American former competition swimmer for the University of California Los Angeles and a 1968 Olympic gold medalist in the 4x100-meter freestyle relay. An exceptional freestyle sprinter, he was a member of three world record setting 4x100-meter freestyle relay teams.

== Buena Park High School ==
Zorn was born March 10, 1947, in Dayton, Ohio. He swam for California's Buena Park High School, where as a Senior at the trials of the California Interscholastic Federation Swimming and Diving Finals in May 1965, he broke the National Interscholastic records for both the 50-yard freestyle with a time of 21.5 seconds and the 100-yard freestyle with a time of 48.3 seconds, .4 seconds faster than the standing record. As a high performing swimmer for Buena Park, Zorn signed to swim for the University of California Los Angeles in May 1965.

== Swimming for UCLA ==
In 1968, he won the 100-meter freestyle NCAA title competing for University of California, Los Angeles under exceptional Coach Bob Horn. At the Santa Clara Invitational, an International Meet in July 1968, he won the 100-meter event in 53.8, beating out Yale swimmer and 1964 Gold medalist Don Schollander.

== International competition ==
=== 1968 Olympic gold medal ===
He trained for the Olympics with the Phillips 66 team in Long Beach California under Hall of Fame Coach Don Gambril, who would also coach him at the 1968 Olympics, with Olympic Head Coach George Haines. In one of his most publicized swims, Zorn set a world record in the 100 m freestyle of 52.6 at the 1968 Olympic Trials in Los Angeles.

At the 1968 Olympics in Mexico City, he earned a gold medal in the 4×100-meter freestyle relay. Though he progressed well in the preliminary rounds of the 100-meter freestyle, due to food poisoning the night before the event, placed eighth in the individual 100-meter freestyle finals. As he had previously set the individual world record in the 100-meter event at the Olympic trials, his last place finish was a disappointment and Australian teenager Michael Wenden's gold medal in the even was considered unexpected. Several American athletes performed poorly in Mexico City due to the high altitude.

Zorn won a silver medal in the 100-meter freestyle event swimming at the 1967 Pan American Games in Winnipeg, Manitoba, Canada, where the United States team heavily dominated the medal count. Winnipeg's Pan Am Pool, now a public facility, was built specifically for the 1967 Pan Am Games.

=== 4 x 100m Freestyle relay world records ===
Besides swimming with the World record breaking 4x100-meter freestyle relay team at the Olympic trials with Steve Rerych, Ken Walsh, and Don Schollander, he was a member of two other World record breaking 4x100 meter teams. His first was at the 1967 Summer Universiade where he swam with Ken Walsh, Don Havens and Greg Charlton. His gold medal 4x100 meter freestyle relay team at the 1968 Mexico City Olympics also broke a world record.

=== Honors ===
In 1965, he was made the Buena Park High School athlete of the year for 1964–65.

On November 3, 2012, he was inducted into the Hawai'i Swimming Hall of Fame.

== See also ==
- List of Olympic medalists in swimming (men)
- List of University of California, Los Angeles people
- World record progression 100 metres freestyle
- World record progression 4 × 100 metres freestyle relay
