= Ken Walsh =

American swimmer (born 1945)

Personal information
- Full name: Kenneth Marshall Walsh
- Nickname: "Ken"
- National team: United States
- Born: February 11, 1945 (age 81) Orange, New Jersey, U.S.
- Height: 6 ft 2 in (1.88 m)
- Weight: 185 lb (84 kg)

Sport
- Sport: Swimming
- Strokes: Freestyle
- Club: Phillips 66
- College team: Michigan State University
- Coach: Charles McCaffree (MSU)
Medal record
Men's swimming
Representing the United States
Olympic Games
Gold medal – first place	1968 Mexico City	4x100 m freestyle
Gold medal – first place	1968 Mexico City	4x100 m medley
Silver medal – second place	1968 Mexico City	100 m freestyle
Pan American Games
Gold medal – first place	1967 Winnipeg	4×100 m freestyle
Gold medal – first place	1967 Winnipeg	4×100 m medley
Universiade
Gold medal – first place	1967 Tokyo	4×100 m freestyle
Gold medal – first place	1967 Tokyo	4×100 m medley
Representing Michigan State Spartans
NCAA Championships
Gold medal – first place	1967 East Lansing	100 yard freestyle

Kenneth Marshall Walsh (born February 11, 1945) is an American former competition swimmer for Michigan State University, a two-time 1968 Olympic gold medalist, and former world record-holder in three events.

== Career ==
=== Swimming for Michigan ===
Walsh was born in Orange, New Jersey, and grew up in Ponte Vedra Beach, Florida. He attended Michigan State University in East Lansing, Michigan, where he swam for coach Charles McCaffree's Michigan State Spartans swimming and diving team in National Collegiate Athletic Association (NCAA) competition from 1965 to 1967. During his three-year college career, he received twelve All-American honors, and won Big Ten Conference championships in the 100-meter freestyle (1965, 1967), 200-meter freestyle (1967), and 4×100-meter freestyle relay (1967). As a college senior in 1967, he won the NCAA national championship in the 100-yard freestyle.

Later that same year, he set a new world record (52.6 seconds) in the 100-meter freestyle at the 1967 Pan American Games.

=== 1968 Mexico Olympics ===
At the 1968 Summer Olympics in Mexico City, Walsh won two gold medals in relay events and a silver medal in individual competition. He was managed and trained at the Olympics by Hall of Fame Coach Don Gambril. Some of his preparatory time for the Olympics may have also been with Gambril who coached the Phillips 66 swim club from 1967-71 when Walsh was in his peak training years for the Olympics and Pan American games. Walsh won the first of his two Olympic gold medals by swimming the anchor leg for the winning U.S. team in the men's 4×100-meter freestyle relay, together with teammates Zac Zorn, Stephen Rerych and Mark Spitz. He won his second gold medal by swimming the final freestyle leg for the first-place U.S. team in the men's 4×100-meter medley relay, together with teammates Charlie Hickcox (backstroke), Don McKenzie (breaststroke), and Doug Russell (butterfly). The two U.S. relay teams set new world records in both events. Walsh also captured a silver medal for his second-place performance (52.8 seconds) in the men's 100-meter freestyle event, finishing six tenths (0.60) of a second behind winner Mike Wenden of Australia, and two tenths (0.20) of a second ahead of fellow American Mark Spitz. Wenden set a new world record in the event, eclipsing Walsh's previous mark from 1967.

== See also ==
- List of Michigan State University people
- List of Olympic medalists in swimming (men)
- World record progression 100 metres freestyle
- World record progression 4 × 100 metres freestyle relay
- World record progression 4 × 100 metres medley relay

Records
Preceded by Alain Gottvallès	Men's 100-meter freestyle world record-holder (long course); July 27, 1967 – October 19, 1968	Succeeded by Michael Wenden
