= Gilles Moreau =

French swimmer

Personal information
- Born: 2 May 1945 (age 81) Loire-Atlantique, France

Sport
- Sport: Swimming

Gilles Moreau (born 2 May 1945) is a French former freestyle swimmer. He competed in the men's 200 metre freestyle at the 1968 Summer Olympics.
