= Stephen Rerych =

American swimmer (born 1946)

Personal information
- Full name: Stephen Karl Rerych
- Nickname: "Steve"
- National team: United States
- Born: May 14, 1946 (age 80) Philadelphia, Pennsylvania, U.S.
- Height: 6 ft 7 in (2.01 m)
- Weight: 201 lb (91 kg)

Sport
- Sport: Swimming
- Strokes: Freestyle
- College team: North Carolina State University (NCSU)
- Coach: Willis Casey (NCSU)
Medal record
Men's swimming
Representing the United States
Olympic Games
Gold medal – first place	1968 Mexico City	4×100 m freestyle
Gold medal – first place	1968 Mexico City	4×200 m freestyle

Stephen Karl "Steve" Rerych (born May 14, 1946) is an American retired surgeon and former swimmer for North Carolina State University, a 1968 Olympic gold medalist, and former world record-holder.

Rerych attended North Carolina State University from 1964-1968 where he swam for outstanding Coach, Willis Casey. As an exceptional athlete, he also played baseball for NC State, and played pitcher the year the team progressed to the College World Series.

He won an American Athletic Union title in the 100-yard indoor freestyle in 1966, his only AAU championship.

== 1968 Mexico City Olympics ==
At the 1968 Summer Olympics in Mexico City, Rerych won two gold medals. He swam the second leg for the winning U.S. team in the men's 4×100-meter freestyle relay; with relay teammates Zac Zorn, Mark Spitz and Ken Walsh, he helped set a new world record of 3:31.7 in the event final. He received another gold medal as a member of the first-place U.S. team in the 4×200-meter freestyle relay, together with teammates John Nelson, Spitz and Don Schollander. Individually, he also competed in the preliminary heats of the men's 200-meter freestyle, clocking a time of 2:00.6, but did not advance.

== Professional career ==
He later went on to become a general surgeon. Rerych received his medical degree from Columbia University College of Physicians and Surgeons in 1974. In 1975, he completed his internship at Duke University Medical Center in general and thoracic surgery. In 1986, Rerych was named the Chief Resident in General, Vascular and Thoracic Surgery at Duke University and the Veteran's Medical Center in Asheville, North Carolina.

In 1990 he had his first and only child, Stephanie Rerych. In 1991, he served as an assistant clinical professor of general, vascular and thoracic surgery at the same institutions. Prior to moving to West Virginia, he was in private practice as a general, thoracic and plastic surgeon in Asheville, practicing at Memorial Mission Hospital and St. Joseph's Hospital (now combined as The Mission St. Joseph's Health System).

== See also ==
- List of Columbia University alumni
- List of North Carolina State University people
- List of Olympic medalists in swimming (men)
- World record progression 4 × 100 metres freestyle relay
