= Diego Martel =

Spanish swimmer (1948–2021)

Personal information
- Nationality: Spanish
- Born: 15 January 1948 Santa Cruz de Tenerife, Spain
- Died: 26 April 2021 (aged 73)

Sport
- Sport: Swimming

Diego Martel (15 January 1948 – 26 April 2021) was a Spanish swimmer. He competed in the men's 4 × 100 metre freestyle relay at the 1968 Summer Olympics. He died in April 2021 at the age of 73 years.
