= Luis Aguilar (swimmer) =

Costa Rican swimmer (born 1952)

Personal information
- Born: 14 September 1952 (age 73) San José, Costa Rica

Sport
- Sport: Swimming

Luis Aguilar (born 14 September 1952) is a Costa Rican former swimmer. He competed in the men's 100 metre freestyle at the 1968 Summer Olympics.
