= Werner Krammel =

German swimmer

Personal information
- Born: 19 February 1949 (age 77) Munich, German

Sport
- Sport: Swimming

Werner Krammel (born 19 February 1949) is a German former swimmer. He competed in two events at the 1968 Summer Olympics.
