= Swimming at the 1967 Pan American Games – Men's 4 × 100 metre freestyle relay =

Men's 4 × 100 metre freestyle relay at the 1967 Pan American Games
- Venue: Pan Am Pool
- Dates: July 27 (preliminaries and finals)
- Competitors: from - nations

Medalists
| Gold medal | Ken Walsh, Michael Fitzmaurice, Mark Spitz and Don Schollander | United States |
| Silver medal | - | Canada |
| Bronze medal | - | Argentina |

The men's 4 × 100 metre freestyle relay competition of the swimming events at the 1967 Pan American Games took place on 27 July at the Pan Am Pool. It was the first appearance of this event in the Pan American Games.

This race consisted of eight lengths of the pool. Each of the four swimmers completed two lengths of the pool. The first swimmer had to touch the wall before the second could leave the starting block.

== Results ==
All times are in minutes and seconds.

| KEY: | q | Fastest non-qualifiers | Q | Qualified | GR | Games record | NR | National record | PB | Personal best | SB | Seasonal best |

=== Final ===
The final was held on July 27.

| Rank | Name | Nationality | Time | Notes |
|---|---|---|---|---|
| 1st place, gold medalist(s) | Ken Walsh; Mike Fitzmaurice; Mark Spitz; Don Schollander | United States | 3:34.8 | GR |
| 2nd place, silver medalist(s) | - - - - | Canada | 3:40.8 | |
| 3rd place, bronze medalist(s) | - - - - | Argentina | 3:45.5 | SA |
| 4 | - - - - | Puerto Rico | 3:45.9 | |
| 5 | - - - - | Brazil | 3:46.2 | NR |
| 6 | - - - - | Mexico | 3:47.5 | |
| 7 | - - - - | Peru | 3:53.0 | |
| 8 | - - - - | El Salvador | - | |
