= János Steinmetz =

Hungarian water polo player

Personal information
- Born: October 15, 1947 Budapest, Hungary
- Died: May 9, 2007 (aged 59) Budapest, Hungary

Sport
- Sport: Water polo
Medal record
Representing Hungary
Olympic Games
Bronze medal – third place	1968 Mexico City	Team competition
European Championships
Gold medal – first place	1977 Jönköping	Team competition
Silver medal – second place	1970 Budapest	Team competition

János Steinmetz (15 October 1947 – 9 May 2007) was a Hungarian water polo player who competed in the 1968 Summer Olympics. His sons, Barnabás and Ádám are also water polo players.

== See also ==
- Hungary men's Olympic water polo team records and statistics
- List of Olympic medalists in water polo (men)
- List of men's Olympic water polo tournament goalkeepers
