= Mária Balla-Lantos =

Hungarian swimmer (born 1944)

Personal information
- Born: 6 December 1944 (age 81) Nógrádverőce, Hungary

Sport
- Sport: Swimming
Medal record
Women's swimming
Representing Hungary
Universiade
Gold medal – first place	1963 Porto Alegre	100 m backstroke

Mária Balla-Lantos (born 6 December 1944) is a Hungarian former backstroke swimmer. She competed at the 1964 Summer Olympics and the 1968 Summer Olympics.
