= Luis Aguilar (sailor) =

Mexican sailor (born 1936)

Personal information
- Nationality: Mexico
- Born: 22 April 1936 (age 88)
- Height: 1.83 m (6 ft 0 in)
- Weight: 85 kg (187 lb)

Sport
- Sport: Sailing

Luis Aguilar (born 22 April 1936) is a Mexican sailor. He competed in the 1964 Summer Olympics.
