= Lothar Gericke =

German swimmer

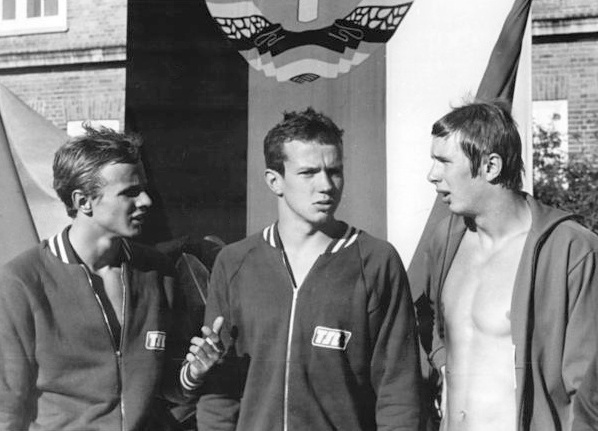
- Wilfried Hartung, Hartmut Flöckner and Lothar Gericke in 1971

Personal information
- Born: 28 February 1950 (age 76) Berlin, Germany
- Height: 1.86 m (6 ft 1 in)
- Weight: 73 kg (161 lb)

Sport
- Sport: Swimming
- Club: Berliner TSC

Lothar Gericke (born 28 February 1950) is a retired German swimmer. He competed at the 1968 Summer Olympics in the 4×100 m freestyle relay and finished in fifth place.
