= Luis Aguilar (writer) =

Mexican writer (1969–2022)

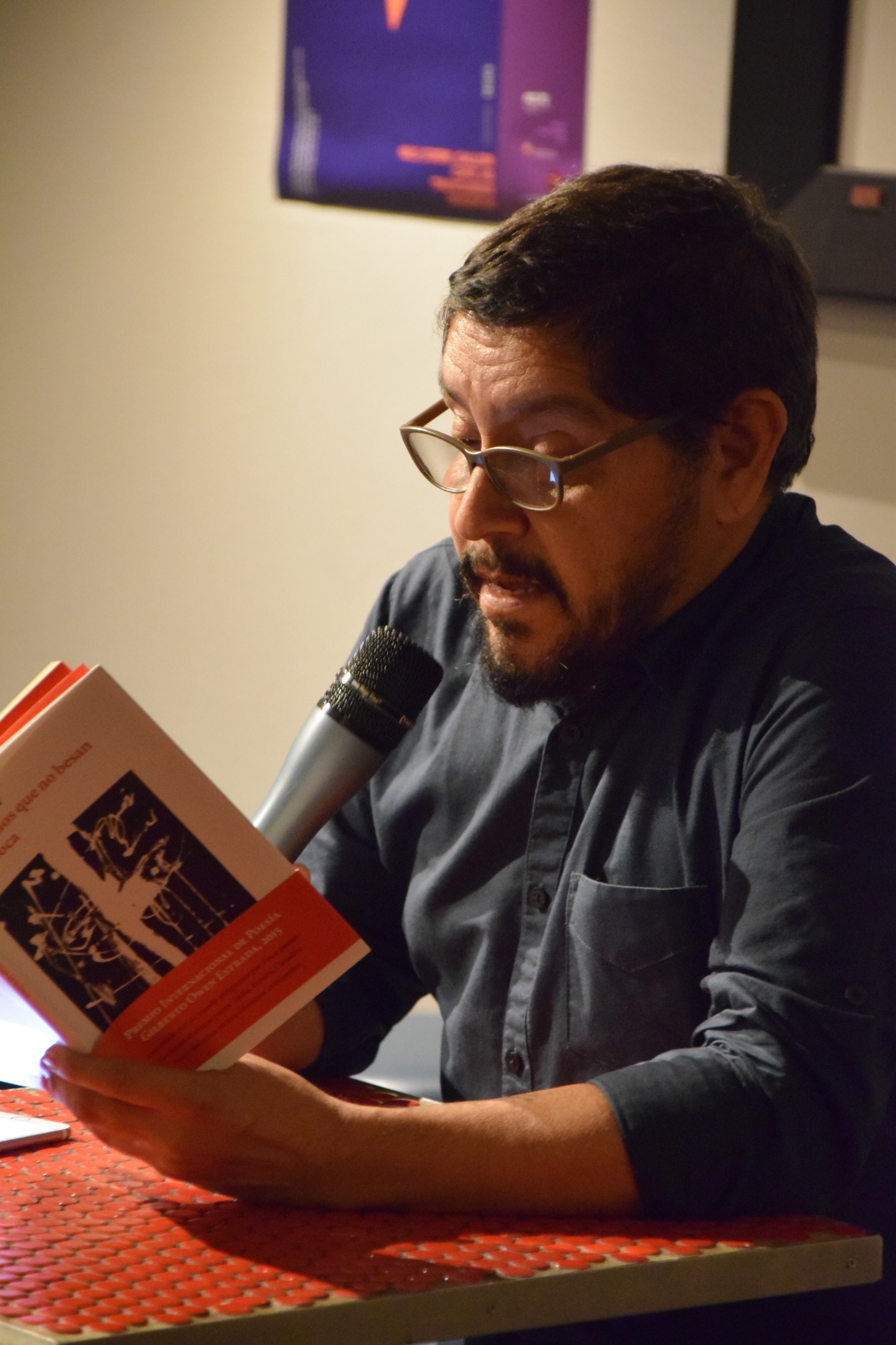
- Born: Luis Aguilar Martínez; 12 December 1969; Valle Hermoso, Tamaulipas
- Died: 15 December 2022 (aged 53)
- Education: Universidad Autónoma de Nuevo León

Luis Aguilar Martínez (12 December 1969 – 15 December 2022) was a Mexican poet, essayist, narrator, and translator. He was the author of Debe ser ya noviembre (Cuadrivio Ediciones, 2019), Muchachos que no besan en la boca (Vaso Roto Ediciones, 2017), Libre de sospecha: Antología boreal (UANL, 2016) and Los ojos ya deshechos (Secretaría de Cultura de Jalisco, 2007), among other books.

== Biography ==
Aguilar was born in Valle Hermoso, Tamaulipas, and resided in Monterrey, Nuevo León, for over thirty years. He was a professor of Literature and Journalism at the Autonomous University of Nuevo León and was one of the most notable and recognized poets in writing about sexual diversity and homoeroticism in Mexico. He was a fellow at the Centro de Escritores de Nuevo León in essay (2000) and novel (2003). He was a prolific writer, the author of more than twenty books in which he cultivated poetry and narrative forms, and in addition was a specialized translator, and both a promoter of and a journalist about culture and the arts.

Among his books of poetry are: Tartaria, Mantel de tulipanes amarillos, Los ojos ya deshechos, La entranhable costume o El libro de Felipe, Decoración de interiores, Os olhos já desfeitos, Fruta de temporada, Ground Glass/Vidrio Molido, Gatos de ninguna parte, Eyes already ruined, No quimio, Travestiario, Libre de sospecha: Antología boreal, Diario de Yony Paz, Muchachos que no besan en la boca, Los cuerpos imprevistos, He decidido casarme cuando acabe la guerra and Vampires never say goodbye. His work has been included in the following collections: Verso Norte (PostData Editores, 2009); Los primeros once (Fondo Editorial Nuevo León, 2010); Territorios de la violencia (Conarte, 2007); Versos veraniegos (Conarte, 2006); La difícil brevedad (CRIPIL Noreste, 2008); Poesia (Rumania, 2011); Trece mantis en un jardín germano/Dreizehn Mantis in einem deutschen Garten (Colegio de Puebla, 2013); Caravansary (Colegio de Puebla, 2014); Versiones acústicas (Mantis Editores, 2014); Después del desierto: nuevo cuento regiomontano (Analfabeta Editores,2016); and Once cuentos rusos (Ficticia Ediciones, 2018).

The number of Aguilar's books dedicated to poetry indicated the inclination he had in his writing: "Poetry is a genre that gives the most satisfaction to Aguilar in his writing. In it, his creative capacity is evident. But not everything is honeyed leaflets, at times poetic creation is complicated. In these instances, the writer lets the text rest and takes on the work of writing short stories. There are two central themes in Aguilar’s poetry: "time and love," although, according to the author, his themes are time and death, which can be seen in his poems Muchachos que no besan en la boca. Dalina Flores explains that in this book: "This collection of poems not only connects the reader to the rite of the satisfaction of rented desire, it is also a cry that, as a denunciation, sneaks between the walls of rooms where we see the lust and innocence of encounters that mean goodbyes. Disagreements so common that they become routine." With regard to narrative, Aguilar points out: "When I write a short story I do it because I'm suffering a lot with what I'm writing in poetry, and I take time to breathe outside of it because, if I don't, I feel like I'm drowning." Another topic that was present in the life of the poet are his trips that mark his literary work.^{[}

In 2009, he published the anthology Exilio transitorio, by Cuban poet Delfín Prats,^{[1]} about whose life he produced the documentary Delfín Prats: entre el esplendor y el caos,^{[2]} co-directed by the Cuban filmmaker Carlos Y. Rodríguez and Spanish filmmaker Laura Llobet. In 2012, he published El agua recobrada, by Luis Armenta Malpica^{[3]}(Vaso Roto Ediciones) and Los arlequines mudos, by Cuban poet Nelson Simón^{[4]} (Mantis Editores). In 2015, he published the book of essays La vida encendida: revisitaciones a Carmen Alardín (ITCA Tamaulipas, Conarte), and in 2014 the anthology of young Cuban poets titled Como vai você^{[5]} (Vaso Roto Ediciones). At the time of his death, he was working on the second volume of the complete works by Brazilian writer Roberto Piva. He was a fellow of the Centro de Escritores de Nuevo León, the National Endowment for Culture and the Arts (FONCA) in Coinversiones Culturales, and the Fundación Biblioteca Nacional de Brasil in their residency program for foreign translators.^{[6]} Luis Aguilar's work has been translated into English, French, Portuguese, German, Catalan, Arabic and Romanian.

Aguilar died on 15 December 2022, at the age of 53.

== Awards and recognition ==
Aguilar was awarded Premio de Poesía Joven "Manuel Rodríguez Brayda" (1988); el Premio Nacional de Periodismo Cultural "Fernando Benítez" (2006); el Premio Regional de Periodismo Cultural FORCA Noreste (2009); el Premio de Cuento "Sobre rieles" (2001); el Premio Nuevo León de Literatura (2010); el Premio Internacional de Poesía Nicolás Guillén (2010); el Premio UANL a las Artes, (2010);^{[1]} el Premio Internacional de Poesía "Gilberto Owen", (2015); el Premio Nacional de Poesía Toluca (2015); el Premio de Poesía Tamaulipas / Juan B. Tijerina (2016); he was one of 13 finalists out of three thousand submissions in the Segundo Concurso Nacional de Cuento Fantástico Amparo Dávila (2016) and obtained an honorable mention for the Premio Nacional de Cuento "Beatriz Espejo" (2018). In 2021, he was awarded the Premio Nacional de Poesía Rodulfo Figueroa 2021,^{[2]} from Chiapas, with the book "Fibonacci, los conejos y un bartender que no dijo su nombre" (forthcoming).

== Literary works ==
Poetry

- Tartaria (Mantis Editores, 2003).
- Mantel de tulipanes amarillos (Écrits des forges/Mantis Editores, 2005).
- Los ojos ya deshechos (Secretaría de Cultura de Jalisco, 2007).
- La entranhable costume o El libro de Felipe (Sebastião Grifo-Mantis Editores, 2008).
- Decoración de interiores (Bonobos, 2010).
- Os olhos já desfeitos (Sebastião Grifo, Brasil, 2010).
- Fruta de temporada (UAQR-UNEAC, Cuba-México, 2011).
- Ground Glass/Vidrio Molido (BookThug, 2012).
- Gatos de ninguna parte, (El Quirófano Ediciones, Ecuador, 2013).
- Eyes already ruined (Libros Medio Siglo, USA, 2015).
- No quimio (H. Ayuntamiento de Toluca, 2015).
- Travestiario (MiCielo Ediciones, 2015).
- Libre de sospecha: Antología boreal (UANL, 2016).
- Diario de Yony Paz (Écrits des forges, Canadá, 2016).
- Muchachos que no besan en la boca (UAEM, 2016).
- Los cuerpos imprevistos (UAC, 2016).
- He decidido casarme cuando acabe la guerra (ITCA Tamaulipas, 2016).
- Vampires never say good bye (Dos Orillas, Miami-Cuba, 2017).
- Ak-47 (UANL, 2017),
- Muchachos que no besan en la boca (Vaso Roto, 2017)
- Debe ser ya noviembre (Cuadrivio Ediciones, 2019).

Narrative

- Lateral izquierdo (CONARTE, 2011)

Poetry Anthologies

- Verso Norte (PostData Editores, 2009)
- Los primeros once (Fondo Editorial Nuevo León, 2010)
- Versos veraniegos (Conarte, 2006)
- Poesia (Rumania, 2011)
- Trece mantis en un jardín germano/Dreizehn Mantis in einem deutschen Garten (Colegio de Puebla, 2013)
- Caravansary (Colegio de Puebla, 2014)
- Versiones acústicas (Mantis Editores, 2014)
- "¡Oh! dejad que la palabra rompa el vaso y lo divino en cosa humana" (Vaso Roto, 2020)

Narrative Anthologies

- Once cuentos rusos (Ficticia Ediciones, 2018).
- Después del desierto: nuevo cuento regiomontano (Analfabeta Editores, cuento, 2016)
- La difícil brevedad (CRIPIL Noreste, cuento, 2008)
- Territorios de la violencia (Conarte, ensayo, 2007)
