= László Cseh Sr. =

Hungarian swimmer (1952–2020)

Personal information
- Born: 14 March 1952 Göd, Hungary
- Died: 24 August 2020 (aged 68)

Sport
- Sport: Swimming

László Cseh Sr. (14 March 1952 – 24 August 2020) was a Hungarian swimmer. He competed at the 1968 Summer Olympics and the 1972 Summer Olympics. His son, László Cseh, is a six time Olympic medalist who has also represented Hungary in swimming at the Summer Olympics.
