= Ferenc Petrovácz =

Hungarian sports shooter (1944–2020)

Personal information
- Born: 13 January 1944 Baja, Hungary
- Died: 14 August 2020 (aged 76) Kecskemét, Hungary

Sport
- Sport: Sports shooting

Ferenc Petrovácz (13 January 1944 – 14 August 2020) was a Hungarian sports shooter. He competed in two events at the 1968 Summer Olympics.
