= Tibor Magyar =

Hungarian cyclist

Personal information
- Born: 4 March 1947 (age 79) Budapest, Hungary

Cycling career
- Sport: Cycling

Tibor Magyar (born 4 March 1947) is a Hungarian former cyclist. He competed in the individual road race and the team time trial events at the 1968 Summer Olympics.
