= Peter Schorning =

German swimmer

Personal information
- Born: 16 July 1947 (age 79) Essen, Germany

Sport
- Sport: Swimming

Peter Schorning (born 16 July 1947) is a German former swimmer. He competed in two events at the 1968 Summer Olympics.
