= Glen Finch =

Canadian swimmer

Personal information
- Born: 18 July 1947 (age 78) Winnipeg, Manitoba, Canada

Sport
- Sport: Swimming

Glen Finch (born 18 July 1947) is a Canadian former freestyle swimmer. He competed in two events at the 1968 Summer Olympics.
