= István Szentirmay =

Hungarian swimmer

Personal information
- Born: 19 July 1949 (age 76) Szeged, Hungary
- Height: 1.86 m (6 ft 1 in)
- Weight: 80 kg (180 lb)

Sport
- Sport: Swimming
- Club: BVSC, Budapest
Medal record
Representing Hungary
European Championships
| Bronze medal – third place | 1966 Utrecht | 4×100 m medley |

István Szentirmay (born 19 July 1949) is a retired Hungarian swimmer who won a bronze medal in the 4 × 100 m medley relay at the 1966 European Aquatics Championships. He competed in seven events at the 1968 and 1972 Summer Olympics; his best achievement was eighth place in the 4 × 100 m medley relay in 1972.
