= Mátyás Borlói =

Hungarian swimmer

Personal information
- Born: 26 September 1952 (age 73) Budapest, Hungary

Sport
- Sport: Swimming

Mátyás Borlói (born 26 September 1952) is a Hungarian former swimmer. He competed in three events at the 1968 Summer Olympics.
