= Masayuki Osawa =

Japanese swimmer

Personal information
- Born: 31 March 1946 (age 80) Manchuria, China

Sport
- Sport: Swimming
- Strokes: freestyle

Masayuki Osawa (大沢 正行, Ōsawa Masayuki; born 31 March 1946) is a Japanese former swimmer. He competed in two events at the 1968 Summer Olympics.
