= Sergey Gusev (swimmer) =

Russian swimmer

Personal information
- Nationality: Russian
- Born: 9 December 1947 (age 78) Moscow, Soviet Union

Sport
- Sport: Swimming

Sergey Gusev (Russian: Сергей Иванович Гусев, born 9 December 1947) is a Russian former swimmer. He competed in three events at the 1968 Summer Olympics for the Soviet Union.
