= Wolfgang Kremer =

German swimmer

Personal information
- Born: 29 October 1945 (age 80) Burg bei Magdeburg, Germany

Sport
- Sport: Swimming

Wolfgang Kremer (born 29 October 1945) is a German former swimmer. He competed at the 1964 Summer Olympics and the 1968 Summer Olympics.
