= Csaba Csatlós =

Hungarian swimmer

Personal information
- Born: 29 March 1950 Eger, Hungary
- Died: 10 September 2011 (aged 61)

Sport
- Sport: Swimming

Csaba Csatlós (29 March 1950 – 10 September 2011) was a Hungarian swimmer. He competed in four events at the 1968 Summer Olympics.
