= Gábor Kucsera (swimmer) =

Hungarian swimmer

Personal information
- Nationality: Hungarian
- Born: 31 July 1949 Budapest, Hungary
- Died: 20 April 2015 (aged 65)

Sport
- Sport: Swimming

Gábor Kucsera (31 July 1949 – 20 April 2015) was a Hungarian swimmer. He competed in four events at the 1968 Summer Olympics.
