= Swimming at the 1964 Summer Olympics – Men's 200 metre backstroke =

Men's 200 metre backstroke at the Games of the XVIII Olympiad
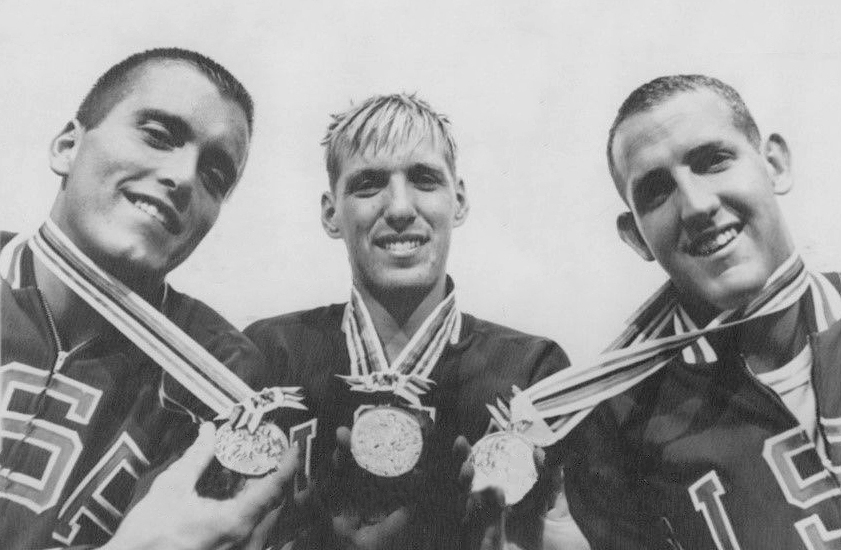
- Medal winners, from left to right: Bob Bennett, Jed Graef and Gary Dilley
- Venue: Yoyogi National Gymnasium
- Dates: 11 October (heats); 12 October (semifinals); 13 October (final)
- Competitors: 34 from 21 nations
- Winning time: 2:10.3 WR

Medalists
1st place, gold medalist(s)		Jed Graef	United States
2nd place, silver medalist(s)		Gary Dilley	United States
3rd place, bronze medalist(s)		Bob Bennett	United States

The men's 200 metre backstroke event at the 1964 Summer Olympics took place between October 11 and 13. There were 34 competitors from 21 nations, with each nation having up to 3 swimmers. The medals were swept by the United States, with Jed Graef, Gary Dilley, and Bob Bennett taking gold, silver, and bronze respectively.

== Background ==
This was the second appearance of the 200 metre backstroke event. It was first held in 1900. The event did not return until 1964; since then, it has been on the programme at every Summer Games. From 1904 to 1960, a men's 100 metre backstroke was held instead. In 1964, only the 200 metres was held. Beginning in 1968 and ever since, both the 100 and 200 metre versions have been held.

As there were 64 years between the prior edition of this event and this one, no swimmers returned from the 1900 Games. Reigning Olympic champion Ernst Hoppenberg had died in 1937. The American team was so strong that the world record holder, Tom Stock, did not make the team.

16 nations made their debut in the event, while 5 returned from the 1900 Games. Sweden was the only nation that had competed in the event in 1900 that did not compete again in 1964, other than Germany (now competing as the United Team of Germany).

== Competition format ==
The competition used a three-round (heats, semifinals, final) format. The advancement rule followed the format introduced in 1952. A swimmer's place in the heat was not used to determine advancement; instead, the fastest times from across all heats in a round were used. There were 9 heats of 7 or 8 swimmers each. The top 24 swimmers advanced to the semifinals. There were 3 semifinals of 8 swimmers each. The top 8 swimmers advanced to the final. Swim-offs were used as necessary to break ties.

This swimming event used backstroke. Because an Olympic size swimming pool is 50 metres long, this race consisted of four lengths of the pool.

== Records ==
These were the standing world and Olympic records (in seconds) prior to the 1964 Summer Olympics.

World record	Tom Stock (USA)	2:10.9	Cuyahoga Falls, United States	10 August 1962
Olympic record	Ernst Hoppenberg (GER)	2:47.0	Paris, France	12 August 1900

The Olympic record was 64 years old, as the event had not been held since the 1900 Games. In the first heat, Bob Bennett broke the record by over 30 seconds, swimming an unrushed 2:16.1. The Olympic record continued to drop throughout the heats and semifinals (with only one of the 7 races in the first two rounds not resulting the record being broken). Shigeo Fukushima swam 2:14.7 in heat 2, Jed Graef 2:14.5 in heat 3, Gary Dilley 2:14.2 in heat 5, Dilley 2:13.8 in semifinal 1, and Graef 2:13.7 in semifinal 2. In the final, Graef and Dilley both broke the world record; the former took gold and the new record with 2:10.3.

== Schedule ==
Date	Time	Round
Sunday, 11 October 1964	20:15	Heats
Monday, 12 October 1964	19:40	Semifinals
Tuesday, 13 October 1964	20:20	Final

== Results ==
=== Heats ===
Five heats were held; the fastest sixteen swimmers advanced to the semifinals.

Rank	Heat	Swimmer	Nation	Time	Notes
1	5	Gary Dilley	United States	2:14.2	Q, OR
2	3	Jed Graef	United States	2:14.5	Q, OR
3	2	Shigeo Fukushima	Japan	2:14.7	Q, OR
4	5	Peter Reynolds	Australia	2:15.9	Q
5	1	Bob Bennett	United States	2:16.1	Q, OR
6	4	Ezio Della Savia	Italy	2:16.6	Q
7	3	Keisuke Ito	Japan	2:16.7	Q
8	2	Viktor Mazanov	Soviet Union	2:16.8	Q
9	1	Isagi Osumi	Japan	2:17.3	Q
10	1	Ralph Hutton	Canada	2:17.8	Q
10	3	Chiaffredo Rora	Italy	2:17.8	Q
12	4	Ernst-Joachim Küppers	United Team of Germany	2:17.9	Q
13	5	József Csikány	Hungary	2:18.3	Q
14	5	Wolfgang Wagner	United Team of Germany	2:18.5	Q
15	1	Henri van Osch	Netherlands	2:19.1	Q
16	5	Carlos van der Maath	Argentina	2:19.6	Q
17	3	Jesús Cabrera	Spain	2:19.7	
18	4	Ivan Ferák	Czechoslovakia	2:20.0	
19	2	Jürgen Dietze	United Team of Germany	2:20.4	
19	2	Jan Weeteling	Netherlands	2:20.4	
21	4	Friedrich Suda	Austria	2:20.7	
22	4	Ron Jacks	Canada	2:21.3	
23	4	Geoffrey Thwaites	Great Britain	2:22.0	
24	5	Robert Christophe	France	2:22.5	
25	1	Lars Kraus Jensen	Denmark	2:23.3	
26	1	Herman Verbauwen	Belgium	2:24.9	
26	3	Pedro Diz	Argentina	2:24.9	
28	3	Gerhard Wieland	Austria	2:25.9	
29	2	John Byrom	Australia	2:27.0	
30	3	Augusto Ferrero	Peru	2:29.9	
31	2	Ákos Gulyás	Hungary	2:30.5	
32	2	Eliot Chenaux	Puerto Rico	2:33.1	
33	1	Michael Eu	Malaysia	2:35.8	
34	4	Chan Kam Hong	Hong Kong	2:46.0	

=== Semifinals ===
Two heats were held; the fastest eight swimmers advanced to the final.

Rank	Heat	Swimmer	Nation	Time	Notes
1	2	Jed Graef	United States	2:13.7	Q, OR
2	1	Gary Dilley	United States	2:13.8	Q, OR
3	1	Shigeo Fukushima	Japan	2:14.1	Q
4	2	Ernst-Joachim Küppers	United Team of Germany	2:15.3	Q
5	2	Viktor Mazanov	Soviet Union	2:15.4	Q
6	2	Peter Reynolds	Australia	2:15.6	Q
7	1	Ralph Hutton	Canada	2:15.8	Q
8	1	Bob Bennett	United States	2:16.3	Q
9	2	Chiaffredo Rora	Italy	2:16.7	
10	1	Isagi Osumi	Japan	2:17.0	
11	1	József Csikány	Hungary	2:17.5	
12	1	Keisuke Ito	Japan	2:17.6	
13	2	Ezio Della Savia	Italy	2:18.4	
14	1	Henri van Osch	Netherlands	2:19.7	
15	2	Wolfgang Wagner	United Team of Germany	2:20.2	
16	2	Carlos van der Maath	Argentina	2:21.3	

=== Final ===
Rank	Swimmer	Nation	Time	Notes
1st place, gold medalist(s)	Jed Graef	United States	2:10.3	WR
2nd place, silver medalist(s)	Gary Dilley	United States	2:10.5	
3rd place, bronze medalist(s)	Bob Bennett	United States	2:13.1	
4	Shigeo Fukushima	Japan	2:13.2	
5	Ernst-Joachim Küppers	United Team of Germany	2:15.7	
6	Viktor Mazanov	Soviet Union	2:15.9	
7	Ralph Hutton	Canada	2:15.9	
8	Peter Reynolds	Australia	2:16.6	
