= Glenn Hummer =

American swimming coach (1905–1992)

Glenn S. Hummer

Biographical details
- Born: February 18, 1905; Roanoke, Indiana, U.S.
- Died: November 3, 1992 (aged 87); Markle, Indiana, U.S.
- Education: University of Illinois BA 1931; Washington U. 1930–31; Columbia U. MA 1937

Playing career
- 1930–1931: University of Illinois; Swam for Coach Ed Manley
- 1927–1930: University of Illinois; Football, basketball, track

Coaching career (HC unless noted)
- 1933–1971: Huntington High School; Teacher, football coach
- 1933–1977: Huntington YMCA (swim coach)
- 1972: U.S. Olympic Coaching Staff
- 1971–1974: Phys. Ed. Professor, Huntington University
- 1974-1977: Aquatics Director, Coach Huntington University

Accomplishments and honors

Championships
- 10 YMCA National Championships; 15 YMCA State Championships (Huntington YMCA)

Awards
- National YMCA Coach of the Year 1969; Joseph Rogers Service to Aquatics Award; Glen S. Hummer Award (For service to distance swimming)

Glenn Sharp Hummer (February 18, 1905 – November 3, 1992), also spelled Glen Hummer, was an American swimming coach best known for coaching the Huntington YMCA swim team in Southern Indiana from 1933 to 1977. In his forty-year career, his Huntington teams won the YMCA National Championship nine times and took nine runner-up finishes. Part of a legacy in the swimming community, Hummer trained and mentored Hall of Fame Coach George Haines as a young swimmer at the Huntington YMCA in the late 1930s–40s. Hummer, who served on the 1972 Munich Olympic staff, trained two Olympic medalists at the Huntington Y, 1964 Tokyo Silver Medalist Gary Dilley, and 1976 Montreal gold medalist Matt Vogel.

== Early life and education ==
Glenn Hummer was born February 18, 1905, in Roanoke, Indiana, to Fannie Hariss Hummer and Rafe Hummer, a middle child in a family of ten children. He excelled as an athlete in track, baseball, football and swimming. He attended Huntington High School where he graduated as a member of the Honor Society on May 20, 1927. Though active in other sports, he played Center for the Huntington High Vikings basketball team, coached by Wendell H. Kinsey.

Hummer did some of his early swimming at a rock quarry near Huntington, one of the many spring fed limestone quarries in the area. By 1924, he helped organize players for the Huntington YMCA Swim team, and was a lifeguard at the Idle Hour Pool where Hummer and later the Huntington Y swimmers often swam. In 1927, he served as President of the Huntington YMCA's Hi-Y Club, dedicated to both sports and scholarship. In later life, he would continue to remain active in the Huntington and national YMCA community. In January 1927, Hummer joined the Huntington YMCA swim team planning to attend the February 12 YMCA Indiana State Championship, and practiced with the team in preparation at Huntington's Hotel LaFontaine three days per week. In the summer after his high school graduation, a capable swimmer by August 1927, Hummer competed in the Indianapolis AAU Swim Meet, entering in the 100-meter backstroke, and breaststroke, though he had limited experience competing and training with a high school swim team. Hummer's early competitive experience with multiple strokes would aid him later as a coach when improving the efficiency of his swimmers who competed in strokes other than freestyle.

=== University of Illinois ===
Enrolling as a freshman in the fall of 1927, by 1931, he completed his Bachelor of Science degree in Zoological Science from the University of Illinois, where he played end as an All-American football standout. Hummer also played guard and forward for the Illini basketball team, and was on the University of Illinois track team. As a freshman football competitor, Hummer was injured when his head struck a goal post during a practice, and was briefly hospitalized but recovered. In June 1929, he attended the 40th YMCA Conference in Lake Geneva as a Delegate for the university. Ending his participation in other sports, in his senior year at the University of Illinois, he trained and competed with the swim team under Head Coach Ed Manley. Manley, who had formerly competed with the Missouri Athletic Club in St. Louis, coached swimming and water polo at the University of Illinois for thirty-seven years from 1912 to 1952, with a break from 1917 to 1920 for WWI. He was Illinois's longest serving coach to date. One of swimming's greatest coaches, Hall of Fame Coach James "Doc" Counsilman of Indiana University, assisted coached under Manley while completing his master's degree at Illinois in 1948.

Coaching during the summers during his early years at Illinois, Hummer was a summer athletic director for Huntington's junior baseball league in 1928–9, and coached swimming and other athletics at Camp Dick Runyon on Lake Tippecanoe, a deep glacial lake in Northern Indiana.

=== Graduate education ===
Continuing his education, he attended graduate school from 1931 to 1932 at Washington University, and completed a master's degree in Physical Education from Columbia University in Manhattan in 1937.

During WWII, having already worked a decade as a Huntington swim coach, Hummer served with the U.S. Navy from around 1942–1945, where he was a Chief/Supervisor, and instructed rowing, returning to teach at Huntington High School and coach the Huntington Y Swim team immediately after leaving the service.

== Huntington YMCA coach ==
While teaching primarily biology and science at Huntington High School from 1933 to 1971, Hummer simultaneously coached the Huntington YMCA through 1977. Huntington YMCA teams sometimes trained in the summer in a limestone quarry known as "Big Blue" for open water practice, and in Huntington's Lake Clare which could accommodate more swimmers. During his long career as a coach at the Y, he mentored and trained 800 swimmers, who obtained 90 scholarships. Hummer focused on establishing discipline in his swimmers, and properly preparing them for meets. He studied the times of competing swimmers and informed his swimmers of their competition. In an interview, he commented that what set himself apart as a coach was his focus on stroke efficiency, and noted "I concentrate on eliminating lost motion in strokes." If necessary, Hummer would stop a swimmer's training to have him come on deck and learn how he could improve his stroke. Like most modern coaches, Hummer frequently used interval training to improve speed. Interval training involves repeating distances with set times between each distance for rest. Hummer built endurance by having his swimmers swim miles in open water, particularly when training distance swimmers.

One of his best-known swimmers in the late 1930s and early 1940s was George Haines, who would later become a Hall of Fame swimming coach and found California's renowned Santa Clara Swim Club. In his forty-year career with the Huntington YMCA, Hummer's teams placed first in the YMCA National Championships in ten years, with nine years as runner-ups. During a highpoint in the 1960s, Hummer's teams won the YMCA National Championship team title a total of seven times, took the runner-up place two times, and placed third one time. As a regional power, the Huntington YMCA team won the Indiana YMCA State Championship for a total of 15 years.

=== Distance swim coach ===
An important contributor to long distance swim coaching, Hummer's YMCA teams captured twelve long-distance championships in national competition. Thirty-five of Hummers' swimmers became AAU All Americans. From 1968 to 1969, Hummer was a Long Distance Swimming chairman for the American Athletic Union, and held the position again from 1975 to 1976.

The Glen S. Hummer Award was named in Hummer's honor in 1978. The Open Water Swimming Committee bestows the award upon the swimmer or coach who most contributes to long-distance swimming. Bringing greater public attention to distance swimming, Hummer was chosen as Director for six AAU Senior Long Distance Swimming Championships on the National level, and helped modify AAU long-distance swimming rules for the AAU handbook.

In 1970, Hummer was selected by the U.S. AAU to Coach the U.S. National swimming team.

=== Olympic coach ===
Hummer served on the U.S. team staff for the Pan American Games in 1971, and was selected in 1972 as part of the U.S. Olympic Coaching staff for the Olympic Games in Munich. He attended Olympic games from 1960 to 1972.

=== Outstanding swimmers ===
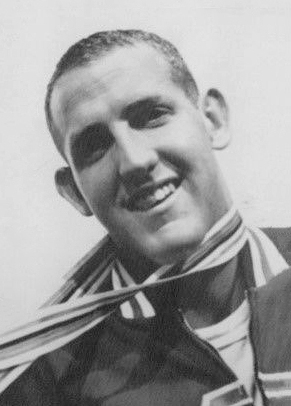
1964 Olympian Gary Dilley

Hummer's outstanding swimmers included 1964 Tokyo Silver Medalist Gary Dilley, and 1976 Montreal double gold medalist Matt Vogel who swam for Hummer's Huntington Y team, and later coached swimming for over 20 years. In Huntington, Hummer coached Marilyn Hull, who served as a coach at Meridian Country Club in Indianapolis beginning in August 1943. According to one source, Hummer may have also been briefly instrumental in coaching 1964 and 1968 Olympic medalist Don Schollander, 1964 Tokyo Olympic gold medalist Gary Illman who became a swim coach, and 1960 Rome Olympian Chris Von Salza. In his early career at the Huntington YMCA, Hummer coached Jerald "Jerry" Rudig, who placed fourth in the 1500 meter swim at the 1936 Olympic swim trials at Providence, Rhode Island.

Jerry Holtrey, who grew up in Huntington, was another swimmer with Hummer's Huntington YMCA team beginning in the late 1950s. Holtrey swam on Hummer's 1957 YMCA Huntington national championship team. Holtrey coached the Lake Erie Silver Dolphins and the Hawken School Swim team from 1969 through 2014, where he led his teams to 26 Ohio State Swim Championships, and was coach to Olympians Diana Munz and Melanie Valerio.

=== Retirement ===
Retiring as a schoolteacher in 1971, beginning in 1971, Hummer was hired as a Physical Education Associate Professor at Huntington College, and in 1974, was hired to also serve as the Aquatics Director at Huntington College, now Huntington University. He continued coaching the Huntington YMCA through around 1977. He was a member of the Retired Teachers Association after ending his teaching career around 1971.

=== Honors ===
In 1969, in the first year of its presentation, Hummer was a recipient of the YMCA National Coach of the year. Recognized as a pioneer in the advancement of Open Water swimming, the Glenn S. Hummer award for contributions to long-distance swimming was named in his honor in 1978, and Huntington's local mile swim was renamed the Glenn Hummer Huntington Mile. Hummer was a recipient of the Joseph G. Rogers National Distinguished Service to Aquatics Award for his service to the YMCA Aquatics program upon his retirement in 1977.

Hummer died on November 3, 1992, at the age of 87 at the Markle Health Care Center in Markle, Indiana, with a funeral conducted at Myer Funeral Home's Huntington Chapel on November 6. He outlived nearly all his siblings, with one surviving sister, Dorothy, and was a member of Huntington's Evangelical United Methodist Church. He was buried at the Gardens of Memory Cemetery in Huntington, Indiana.
