= David Calvin Echodu =

Ugandan journalist, economist and politician

- Incumbent
- Assumed office 2026

Member of Parliament for Soroti West Division, Soroti City
- In office 2026–2031

NRM National Vice Chairperson for Eastern Uganda
- Incumbent
- Assumed office 2025

Co-founder and leader of Pilgrim Africa
- Incumbent
- Assumed office 2007

Personal details
- Born: 24 November 1973 (age 52)
- Party: National Resistance Movement
- Education: Makerere University; Washington University
- Occupation: Journalist, economist, entrepreneur, politician
- Known for: Entrepreneurship, humanitarian work, politics

David Calvin Echodu, also known as Calvin Echodu (born 24 November 1973), is a Ugandan journalist, economist, entrepreneur and politician representing Soroti West County as the elected Member of Parliament on the National Resistance Movement (NRM) ticket in the 12th Parliament (2026–2031).

== Early life and education ==
Echodu was born on 24 November in 1973 in Teso Sub-region, Soroti district (Uganda). He attended Kateta Model Primary School and Kococwa Primary School for his primary education. From there, Echodu joined Teso College Aloet and Amuria Secondary School before joining Makerere University and Washington University, United States.

== Career ==
Echodu began his career as a journalist before moving into humanitarian work and entrepreneurship. In 2007, he co-founded Pilgrim Africa, where he has led programmes in malaria prevention, trauma counselling, education, and community development across Uganda.

As an entrepreneur, Echodu founded Earthwise Ferries Uganda, a company that seeks to modernize passenger water transport on Lake Victoria through the introduction of catamaran ferries. Through Pilgrim Africa, he also helped establish Beacon of Hope School (now Beacon of Hope College/Soroti Municipal Secondary School) in Soroti, which was founded in 2006 to provide education to former child soldiers, war-affected children, and other disadvantaged youth.

== Political career ==
Echodu entered active politics in 2021, when he contested for the Soroti City West Division parliamentary seat on the NRM ticket but lost to Jonathan Ebwalu and in 2025, was elected as the NRM National Vice Chairperson for Eastern Uganda.

In the 2026 Ugandan general election, Echodu was elected as the Member of Parliament for Soroti West Division, Soroti City in the 12th Parliament (2026–2031). Following the elections, President Yoweri Museveni appointed him Minister of State for Foreign Affairs (International Affairs) in the 2026–2031 Cabinet. Although his appointment was initially delayed due to citizenship-related legal issues, he remained the President's nominee for the portfolio.

== See also ==
- Mike Mukula
- Jessica Alupo
- Joan Acom Alobo
