= Matt Vogel (swimmer) =

American swimmer

- Vogel in 1976

Personal information
- Full name: Matthew Haynes Vogel
- Nickname: "Matt"
- National team: United States
- Born: June 3, 1957 (age 69) Fort Wayne, Indiana, U.S.
- Height: 6 ft 1 in (1.85 m)
- Weight: 187 lb (85 kg)

Sport
- Sport: Swimming
- Strokes: Butterfly
- Club: Huntington YMCA
- College team: University of Tennessee
- Coach: Glenn Hummer (Huntington Y); Ray Bussard (U. Tennessee)
Medal record
Men's swimming
Representing the United States
Olympic Games
Gold medal – first place	1976 Montreal	100 m butterfly
Gold medal – first place	1976 Montreal	4x100 m medley relay

Playing career
- circa 75-79: University of Tennessee; 1980 graduate
- Position: Butterfly

Coaching career (HC unless noted)
- 1980-1985: Green Meadow Country Club, Alcoa, Tennessee
- 1985-1995: Atomic City Aquatic Club; U.S. Swimming; Oak Ridge, Tennessee
- 1996-1999 circa: Visalia Area Swim Team; Visalia, California
- 2000-2005 circa: Canoe City Swim Club; Old Town, Maine
- 2005-2014: Fort Wayne Aquatics
- 2014-: Coastal Maine Aquatics; Cape Elizabeth, Maine

Accomplishments and honors

Awards
- International Swimming Hall of Fame '96

Matthew Haynes Vogel (born June 3, 1957) is a swim coach of over forty years, an American former competition swimmer for the University of Tennessee, a 1976 Olympic gold medalist in the butterfly and medley relay, and a former world record-holder in the 4x100-meter medley relay event.

== Age group swimming ==
Born in 1957, Vogel began competitive swimming near his hometown of Fort Wayne for Coach Glenn Hummer where he competed at the nearby YMCA in Huntington, Indiana and in the quarry where each summer the National Long Distance Championships were held. Vogel swam with Hummer's YMCA team beginning at the age of seven from around 1964–74, but left the program in his High School Senior year to swim with a Fort Wayne YMCA team. Hummer brought prominence and recognition to the Huntington Y, having taught swimming technique to Hall of Fame Coach George Haines and '68 Olympic champion Sharon Wichman. Swimming with the Huntingdon Y, at fifteen Vogel swam a 2:11 for the 200 Individual Medley, placing fourth in the Indiana AAU Senior Swimming Championships in March 1972.

=== YMCA Nationals champion ===
As a high school senior in 1975 he competed in the YMCA Nationals in Ft. Lauderdale, Florida, and alerting competitors to his specialty, he notched a career-making win in the 100-yard butterfly and a second-place finish in the 200-yard fly. His victory in the 100-yard fly made him the YMCA age group national champion in the event, a distinction he would need to earn a college scholarship. Vogel graduated Fort Wayne's Snider High School in June 1975, but unlike many elite High School age group swimmers, he never swam with his high school team, so his prospects for a college swimming career were more limited.

== College swimming ==
Realizing Matt's potential, the University of Tennessee recruited Matt after High School graduation, and in the summer of 1975, Tennessee's Hall of fame Coach Ray Bussard started training him to compete in long course competition. As a Freshman at Tennessee, Matt continued to train in short course (25 meters or yards) competition, winning the 100-yard butterfly at the March 1976 NCAA Championships at Brown University, marking his first win in international competition. Demonstrating an unexpected mastery of the event, he led throughout the race.

== Two golds at 1976 Montreal Olympics ==
Continuing to train with Coach Bussard, he barely qualified at the first preliminary June, 1976 Olympic Trials swimming the 100-meter butterfly with a time of 55.25, finishing behind Joe Bottom, and Gary Hall Sr., becoming the only University of Tennessee swimmer to qualify for the Olympics. However, he won the final Olympic trial in 55.14, beating second place Gary Hall by .36 seconds.

Despite his modest showing in the trials, Vogel traveled with the team to the Montreal 1976 Summer Olympics in late July and with an exceptional performance received a gold medal in both the 100-meter butterfly, and the 4×100-meter medley relay.

=== 100 butterfly gold ===
For his winning Olympic 100-meter butterfly event on July 21, his head was shaved to maximize his speed, and he trailed American teammate Gary Hall by a fraction of a second after the 50 meter turn. With extra effort before a cheering crowd of 10,000, he touched first at the finish in 54.35, just slightly off the standing world record.

=== 4x100-meter medley relay gold ===
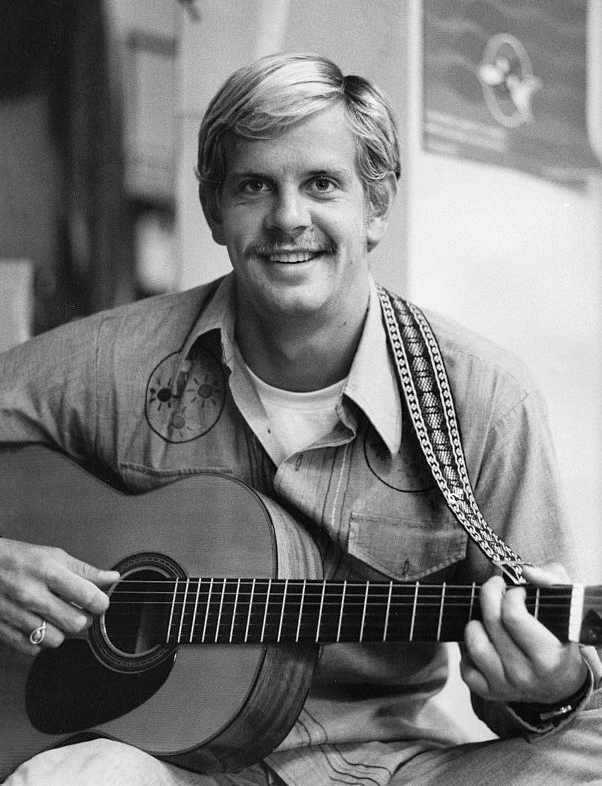
John Naber, '76

Vogel's other Olympic gold was as part of a relay in the 4×100-meter medley on July 22, 1976, at Montreal which set a world record that held from July 22, 1976, to August 7, 1982. The four man US team's winning time was 3:42.22, with USC swimmer John Naber setting an insurmountable lead in his backstroke leg, and each individual team member posting the fastest time for their leg. The Montreal Olympic 100-meter gold medalist from Indiana University, Jim Montgomery swam the final freestyle leg. Impressively, Vogel swam a 54.26 for his opening 100-meter butterfly leg, which was slightly faster than his 100-meter butterfly Olympic gold medal time.

=== NCAA championship, '78 ===
After his victories at the 1976 Olympic Games, exhausted from the rigors of Olympic training, Matt stayed away from the pool for a year. Returning to college competition in 1977–78, as a crowning moment in his swimming career, he swam with the University of Tennessee swim team that won the NCAA National Championship. Though he finished fourth at the '78 NCAA finals at Long Beach State in his signature event, the 100 butterfly, his time of 49.47 was still remarkable considering his year away from the pool. Despite taking off his junior year, and a sophomore year that did not meet the highs of his world record setting freshman performances, Matt was named an All America swimmer in three years during his time at Tennessee. In 1978, the Tennessee swimming Vols took their seventh straight Southeastern Conference Title.

During his year off after the Olympics, he worked at Scotts, a Fort Wayne area food store. Vogel took until 1980 to graduate, as he left school for a while after his last year of swimming eligibility.

== Coaching ==
After completing college at Tennessee, Vogel started coaching from around 1980–1985, with Green Meadow Country Club in Alcoa, only around fifteen miles Southeast of the University of Tennessee. Originally known for its golf course, the club has a Junior Olympic swimming pool, and their Green Meadow Swim Team was considered one of the best age group teams in the area. He coached Blount Aquatic Club, closer to UT in Knoxville as well during this period, and believed he had developed a strong, year-round competitive program during his coaching years.

=== Atomic City Aquatic Club ===
From 1985 to 1995, in one of his longest and more demanding coaching jobs, he coached the 120-member U.S. swimming program in Oak Ridge, Tennessee known then as the Atomic City Aquatic Club. One of the oldest clubs in Tennessee and formerly coached by another early 1970s University of Tennessee swimmer, Brook Pate, the team had placed twelfth in the men's division and ninth in women's at the Region III age group meet in Tuscaloosa, with a sixth-place overall finish. As another draw, Oak Ridge was only about twenty miles west of Matt's alma mater, the University of Tennessee. With large facilities, the year-round program had an 100-meter outdoor pool, and in winter could use the indoor Oak Ridge Civic Center.

=== Visalia Area Swim Team ===
Following his long service with Atomic City, a high-profile position, he began serving as the swim coach of the Visalia Area Swim Team, in Visalia, California, beginning November 1, 1996 through around 1999. A center for top age group swimming, the team was in driving distance of many of Southern California's best known and most elite age group teams. After his first year of coaching in 1997, he was praised by Visalia's President Bob Dingler for shaving 20 seconds off swimmer Ben Britten's 100-meter butterfly. Britten was an elite 14-year old prospect who had been selected for the U.S. National Select Camp to be trained at the Olympic Training Center in Colorado Springs the following month.

=== Canoe City Swim Club ===
After a move to New England, he head coached the Canoe City Swim Club in Old Town, Maine beginning in the summer of 2000 through 2005. In early March 2003, improving his team during his tenure as coach, Vogel was honored as Coach of the Year at a state-wide Maine YMCA swim meet and his swimmer Eric Palmer was named swimmer of the year.

Nostalgic for home, from around 2005–2014, Vogel coached Fort Wayne Aquatics in his home town. The Club hosted a modern indoor pool designed for competition. After 2014, Vogel more recently served as the head coach of Coastal Maine Aquatics in Cape Elizabeth, Maine.

=== Honors ===
Vogel was inducted as an "honor swimmer" into the International Swimming Hall of Fame in 1996. In 1976, in the year of his Olympic medals, he was named one of two Tennessee Sports Hall of Fame Athletes of the Year.

== See also ==
- List of members of the International Swimming Hall of Fame
- List of Olympic medalists in swimming (men)
- List of University of Tennessee people
- World record progression 4 × 100 metres medley relay
