= Jed Graef =

American swimmer (born 1942)

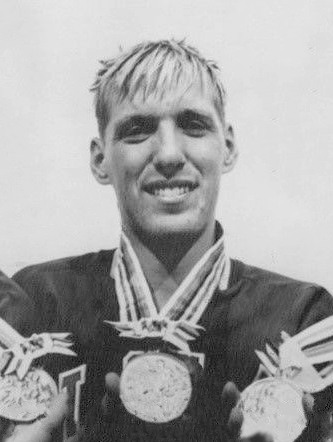
- Graef at the 1964 Olympics

Personal information
- Full name: Jedward Richard Graef
- National team: United States
- Born: May 1, 1942 (age 84) Montclair, New Jersey, U.S.
- Height: 6 ft 6 in (1.98 m)
- Weight: 201 lb (91 kg)
- Spouse: Sunyana Silverman Graef

Sport
- Sport: Swimming
- Strokes: Backstroke
- Club: North Jersey Swim Association (NJSA)
- College team: Princeton University
- Coach: Bob Alexander (NJSA); Bob Clotworthy (Princeton)
Medal record
Representing the United States
Olympic Games
Gold medal – first place	1964 Tokyo	200 m backstroke

Jed Richard Graef (born May 1, 1942) is an American former competition swimmer, for Princeton University, a 1964 Tokyo Olympic gold medalist in the 200-meter backstroke, and former world record-holder.

After obtaining a Doctorate in Psychology from the University of Michigan, he taught for seven years at Toronto University, before moving to Rochester, New York, where he worked as a programmer and treasurer for the Rochester Zen Center, where he met his wife, Sunyana, an ordained Buddhist priest. After a move to Vermont in the late 1980s, he would continue to work as a programmer, serve on the Shelburne School Board, and act as treasurer for the Vermont Zen Center in Shelburne, founded by his wife in 1988.

== Early life ==
Graef was born in Montclair, New Jersey on May 1, 1942, to Mr. and Mrs. Clarence W. Graef, a former collegiate baseball player, and grew up in nearby Verona, located 3 miles (4.8 km) west, where he attended high school. He excelled in the backstroke while competing with the Montclair YMCA swim team beginning around age 10 in 1952. A highly competitive program, with Jed as a participant the Montclair "Y" team went undefeated in 40 meets over a five year period. In 1956-57, he co-captained the team, and in two seasons between 1958-1959 swam on 11 Senior State relay championship teams in 200 and 400-yard freestyle and medley relays.

=== North Jersey Swim Association ===
In addition to swimming with the Montclair "Y" team primarily as a junior swimmer, Graef swam and competed with the North Jersey Swimming Association (NJSA) beginning around 1956 in his high school freshman year. He placed first in the state championships and set New Jersey state backstroke records representing Verona High School, despite Verona lacking a swim team. He graduated Verona High School in June 1960, with good grades and a high class rank. Graef set a new record for the 200-yard backstroke of 2:22 in his Junior year of High School. Graef was greatly influenced by NJSA's Coach Bob Alexander, who focused on high quality, but relatively short workouts, mentored as many as 12 future Olympic participants, and trained his swimmers at Lake Mohawk in North Jersey. During his high school swimming career, he swam year round, seeking out swimming venues during the winter with his coach.

In 1960, in the summer after his high school senior year, he attended the August trials in Dearborn, Michigan for the 1960 Summer Olympics in Rome, but just missed making the U.S. team, swimming a 1:05.1, placing ninth overall, where only the top eight could qualify.

== Princeton University ==
Graef considered attending Princeton, Yale or Colgate University. For reasons not entirely known to him, he attended Princeton University, where he was captain of the Princeton Tigers swim team in 1964, graduating in June of that year with a degree in Psychology. After performing well in meets as an undergraduate, but taking many second places in the 200, finally as a senior Graef won the March 1964 NCAA Championships in the 200-yard backstroke at New Haven, Connecticut establishing a new American collegiate record of 1:56.2, while swimming for Princeton's Hall of Fame Coach Bob Clotworthy. Graef had formerly set a new collegiate record of 1:56.5 in a qualifying round at the meet. Graef's NCAA collegiate championship in the 200-yard backstroke more clearly identified him as America's potential top swimmer in the event, though he had already been ranked second in the World in the 200-meter by the summer of 1961.

== 1964 Tokyo Olympic gold ==
=== Trials ===
After several years of gradual improvement rather than getting notably faster, Graef's backstroke times began an occasional drop during his senior year at Princeton. In the summer of 1964, shortly after his college graduation, Graef qualified for the Tokyo Olympics swimming a 2:12.7 in the 200-meter backstroke finals, placing second at the U.S. trials in Astoria, Queens, New York, only 0.7 seconds behind the unexpected first place finisher Gary Dilley. Graef later noted that with the American depth in backstroke that year, it was harder finding a spot on the team than to win a medal at the Olympics. The team later worked out in Palo Alto, before taking their flight to Japan from Los Angeles on September 30.

=== Olympic gold medal ===
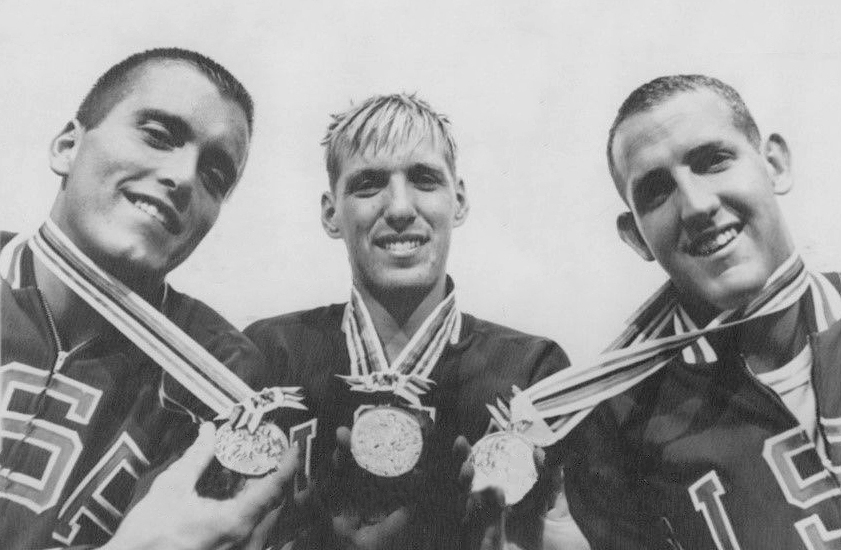
'64 Olympic 200 backstroke medalists, Bennett, Graef, Dilley

Graef won the gold medal in the men's 200-meter backstroke at the 1964 Summer Olympics in Tokyo, Japan on October 13, 1964. He became the first Princeton student to win a gold medal in swimming in the Olympics. Graef was somewhat aided in his quest for the gold, as Tom Stock, the reigning world record holder in the event was ill during the qualifying rounds and did not make the team. Graef later attributed his outstanding swim partly to a quick start, one of the best of his career. The Americans took first, second and third place, led by Graef, who finished 2 seconds under his time in the trials, and set a new Olympic, world, and American record time of 2:10.3 with American Gary Dilley placing a close second. The third place bronze medal position was contested between American Bob Bennett and Shigeo Fukushima of Japan, with Fukushima rapidly closing, but Bennett managed to retain his third place position giving America a complete sweep of the event. Other swimming medalists at the 1964 Olympics that had swum with the New Jersey Athletic Association included Patience Sherman, Thompson Mann, and Phil Riker. Graef's world record held for three years.

== Later life ==
Graef spent some time in Japan and the South Pacific after the games, staying through December 1964. He went to Egypt for several weeks in the summer of 1967 for the U.S. State Department to assist in the coaching and development of Egyptian swimmers, but his coaching, which included a strong psychological and motivational component, ended abruptly as a result of the outbreak of the Six-Day War in early June. In Egypt, he coached with his former coach, Bob Alexander.

=== U. Michigan and teaching psychology ===
After the games, Graef studied for a Doctorate in psychology at the University of Michigan beginning around September 1965, and later became known as a prominent authority in sports psychology. He completed his Phd. from Michigan in 1969. He subsequently did research and taught for seven years at the University of Toronto, where he taught personality theories, and taught and performed psychological testing through around 1976. He began practicing Buddhism around the age of 32 in 1974, while still in Toronto.

=== Working for Zen Centers and programming ===
Leaving the University due to a lack of publications, in a career change he moved to Rochester, New York, and spent six years working at the Rochester Zen Center primarily as a treasurer, where he met his wife, who had been ordained as a Buddhist priest during her time at the Center. During his time in Rochester, both he and his wife Sunyana studied computer programming, while attending the Rochester Institute of Technology. While in Rochester, he also worked as a computer programmer.

After the couple relocated to Vermont around 1988, Jed's wife, Sunyana Graef, formerly known as Gail Silverman, started the Vermont Zen Center in Shelburne, Vermont, initially meeting in their home. By 1990, he and his wife were observing a vegetarian diet with Graef often doing the cooking. Graef worked as a programmer for the government specializing in Housing and Urban Development, and housing for Section 8. By 2012, Graef worked at home in a more managerial position. The couple raised two daughters. In the 2000s Jed worked with the Shelburne Town School District board, and by 2004 or earlier, as treasurer for the Vermont Zen Center. The Center had 200 members in 2003, and was planning to expand into a new 3,000-square-foot (280 m^{2}) building.

== Honors ==
An able student, in 1960 while attending Tulane, he was selected to be the recipient of a National Honor Society Certificate of Merit.

He was inducted into the International Swimming Hall of Fame in Fort Lauderdale as an "Honor Swimmer" in 1988.

He became a member of the initial class of the Verona High School Hall of Fame in August 2004.

The "Jed Graef" Award, established around 1965 by the Verona Sports Booster Club was created to provide an annual award to a senior student at Verona High School who most exhibited the qualities of athletic ability, good sportsmanship, citizenship and scholarship. The Award was given annually through at least 1976.

== See also ==
- List of members of the International Swimming Hall of Fame
- List of Olympic medalists in swimming (men)
- List of Princeton University people
- List of Princeton University Olympians
- World record progression 200 metres backstroke
