= Gary Dilley =

American swimmer (born 1945)

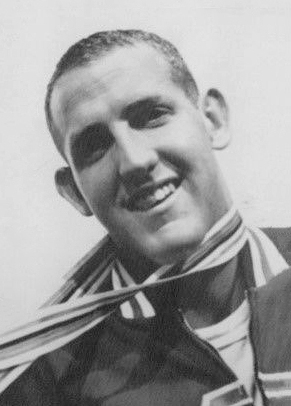
- Dilley at the 1964 Olympics

Personal information
- Full name: Gary J. Dilley
- National team: United States
- Born: January 15, 1945 (age 81) Washington, D.C., U.S.
- Education: Michigan State (1967); Indiana U. (Dentistry); PHd UNC (Othodondist)
- Occupations: Dentist; Orthodontic specialty
- Height: 6 ft 1 in (1.85 m)
- Weight: 165 lb (75 kg)
- Spouse: Diane Halvorson

Sport
- Sport: Swimming
- Event: 100, 200 backstroke
- Strokes: Backstroke, Freestyle
- Club: Huntington, Indiana YMCA; Spartan Swim Club
- College team: Michigan State University (MSU)
- Coach: Glenn Hummer (Huntington YMCA); Charles McCaffree (MSU)
Medal record
Representing the United States
Olympic Games
Silver medal – second place	1964 Tokyo	200 m backstroke
Summer Universiade
Gold medal – first place	1965 Budapest	200 m backstroke
Representing Michigan State Spartans
NCAA Championships
Gold medal – first place	1965 Ames	100 yard backstroke
Gold medal – first place	1965 Ames	200 yard backstroke
Gold medal – first place	1966 Colorado Springs	100 yard backstroke
Gold medal – first place	1966 Colorado Springs	200 yard backstroke

Gary J. Dilley (born January 15, 1945) is an American former competition swimmer who competed for Michigan State University and was a 1964 Tokyo Olympic silver medalist. He competed for Michigan State University, where he earned all American honors twelve times and was admitted to the Michigan State Hall of Fame in 1995. After completing Dental School at Indiana University, and a Doctorate with a specialty in Orthodontics at the University of North Carolina, Dilley started a private Dental practice in Cary, North Carolina in 1983. His North Carolina practice focused primarily on orthodontics until his retirement in 2012.

== Early life and swimming ==
Gary Dilley was born January 15, 1945 to Mr. and Mrs. John A. Dilley in Washington, D.C. After a family move, Gary spent his High School years in greater Huntington, Indiana, where he attended Huntington High School, now Huntington North High, graduating around 1963. From an athletic family, Dilley's father John was a standout swimmer competing for Purdue University in the late 1940's, where he earned an NCAA title, before his collegiate swimming career was cut short by an injury to his shoulder. Gary's father John swam for Coach Dick Papenguth at Purdue, and excelled in backstroke competition, as would Gary. At the Indiana AAU State Swimming Championships on March 15, 1947, father John Dilley, representing Purdue, won the 150-yard backstroke with a pool record time of 1:42.4. Both Gary and his father John would have Glen Sharp Hummer as an early coach for their Huntington YMCA teams. Gary's brother Andy also swam for Glenn Hummer's Huntington YMCA team during his youth.

=== Huntington YMCA ===
Dilley began competitive swimming by the age of 12, and may have first learned to swim in Huntington's Lake Claire. Huntington High School had no swim team in the years he attended. In early competition in August, 1959, at the Shakamak Open in Jason, Indiana, swimming for his Huntington, Indiana YMCA team at 14, Gary won the 100 meter freestyle in a time of 1:03.6, the 200-meter freestyle in a time of 2:21.3, and the 100-meter backstroke in a time of 1:11.2. Through much of his High School career, Dilley was coached by Glenn Hummer with the Huntington YMCA swim team. Dilley's brother Andy also swam with Hummer's Huntington YMCA team. Hummer, a University of Illinois graduate and football All American, coached the Huntington YMCA team from 1933-1977. A strong program, in the 1960's, Hummer's Huntington YMCA teams won the YMCA National title seven times, and Hummer would later serve as part of the U.S. Olympic Coaching staff at the 1972 Olympics.

As a High School Senior at the 1963 YMCA National Swimming Championships in Iowa City, Dilley set a National YMCA backstroke record in the 200-yard event with a time of 2:02.4, breaking his former national record of 2:02.6. At the same 1963 YMCA National meet, in April, Dilley tied the 50-yard freestyle National YMCA age group record with a time of 22.8. By 1962, the Huntington YMCA had won three successive YMCA National Championships with Dilley winning both backstroke events each year. Having been previously recognized as a High School All-American, at the 1963 Indiana YMCA swimming and Diving Championships, Dilley set YMCA state records in the 50-yard freestyle with a time of 23.9, and the 100-yard freestyle with a time of 54 seconds.

== 1964 Tokyo Olympics ==
At the early September, 1964 U.S. Olympic trials in Astoria, New York, in an unexpected victory and a swimming career milestone, Dilley won the finals of the 200-meter backstroke with a time of 2:12.0, qualifying him for the U.S. Olympic team. Future 1964 Olympic gold medalist Jed Graef placed second in the event with a 2:12.7, with Robert Bennett taking third with a 2:12.8. In preparation for the 1964 Tokyo Olympics, Dilley trained for several weeks with the U.S. Olympic team on the West Coast with 1964 U.S. Men's Olympic Head Coach James Counsilman, who was the swim coach at Indiana University.

After travelling to Tokyo with the team, Dilley represented the United States at the 1964 Summer Olympics, where he received a silver medal in men's 200-meter backstroke, with a time of 2:10.5, which would have been a world record, but he finished only .2 seconds behind American teammate Jed Graef. American Bob Bennett took the bronze with a time of 2:13.1, establishing an American sweep in the event. Dilley set new Olympic records in the heats and semifinals, but Graef improved upon Dilley's records in the event's second semifinal and final.

On October 29, 1964, Dilley was honored for his 1964 Olympic silver medal by receiving an escort from firemen and police beginning in Southern Huntington, to the Huntington YMCA where he received the keys to the city from Huntington Mayor Robert Ambler. He was honored in the presence of his parents and his Huntington Coach, Glenn Hummer.

=== Michigan State ===
Dilley attended Michigan State University graduating in 1967, where he swam for the Michigan State Spartans swimming and diving team under Head Coach Charles McCaffree. In his signature events in 1965-66 NCAA championships, the 100 and 200-yard backstroke, he took a total of four individual titles, with two in each event. He earned Big 10 Championship titles eight times in 1965-6, twice each in the 100 and 200 backstroke events, and in 1965 and 1967 he was part of a championship 4x100 freestyle relay team each year. On March 25, 1966, Dilley set an American and NCAA record in the 100-yard backstroke of :52.39. Dilley was undefeated in Collegiate competition in his backstroke events until his Senior year's last meet where he was defeated by Charlie Hickox of Indiana who placed ahead of him in two backstroke events at the 1967 NCAA championship finals. He was a collegiate All-American a total of twelve times, and was a member of the fraternity Delta Tau Delta.

In international competition, at the Universiade in 1965 in Budapest, Hungary, Dilley captured a gold medal in the 200 meter backstroke and another gold medal in the 4x100 freestyle.

In 1969, Gary married Diane Carol Halvorson of Hobart, Indiana, who would later also practice dentistry. In a 1971 swim meet at Indiana University, Dilley won the 100-meter backstroke with a time of 1:11.7, and the 50-meter freestyle in 27.8 seconds. He shared honors with Indiana's 50-year old Coach James "Doc" Counsilman, who established a new age group national record in the 100-meter breaststroke with a time of 1:27.1. Counsilman later won the 50-meter freestyle with a time of 30.8 seconds.

=== Dental education, career ===
After graduating Michigan state around 1967, Dilley completed the Indiana University School of Dentistry, then went on to earn a doctorate in orthodontics from the University of North Carolina School of Dentistry specializing in pediatric dentistry and orthodontics. He first opened his private practice in Orthodontics in North Carolina in 1983. He maintained his orthodontic practice in Cary, North Carolina, near Cary High School. For twelve years, he was a faculty member at the University of North Carolina. Dilley's wife Diane, who also practiced Dentistry, moved with Gary to North Carolina.

=== Honors ===
Dilley was admitted to the Michigan State Hall of Fame in 1995, as a member of the Class of 1967. In his Senior year at Michigan State, Dilley received the Chester Brewer Leadership Award, and he was later awarded the Bill Heusner Service Award by Michigan State for his suppor of their swimming team. Dilley was also named to the list of the College Swimming Coaches' Association of America's 100 Greatest Swimmers and Divers.

== See also ==
- List of Michigan State University people
- List of Olympic medalists in swimming (men)
