= John Byrom (swimmer) =

Australian swimmer

Personal information
- Born: 16 March 1947 (age 79)

Sport
- Sport: Swimming

John Byrom (born 16 March 1947) is an Australian former swimmer. He competed in the men's 200 metre backstroke at the 1964 Summer Olympics.
