= 1965 NCAA University Division swimming and diving championships =

American college aquatic sports competition

- Host city: Ames, Iowa
- Date(s): March 1965
- Venue(s): Beyer Hall Pool; Iowa State University
- Teams: 38
- Events: 17

The 1965 NCAA University Division swimming and diving championships were contested at the 29th annual swim meet sanctioned and hosted by the NCAA to determine the individual and team national champions of men's collegiate swimming and diving among its University Division member programs in the United States, culminating the 1964–65 NCAA University Division swimming and diving season.

These championships were hosted by Iowa State University at the Beyer Hall Pool in Ames, Iowa during March 1964.

Two-time defending champions USC again topped the team standings, edging out Indiana by 6.5 points. This was the Trojans' fourth national title and fourth in five seasons.

== Team standings ==
- (H) = Hosts
- (DC) = Defending champions
- Italics = Debut appearance

Rank	Team	Points
1st place, gold medalist(s)	USC (DC)	285
2nd place, silver medalist(s)	Indiana	278.5
3rd place, bronze medalist(s)	Michigan	221
4	Yale	113.2
5	Ohio State	91.5
6	Michigan State	90
7	SMU	72.5
8	UCLA	50.5
9	Southern Illinois	43
10	North Carolina	41
10	Oregon	41
12	Minnesota	30.5
13	Florida	30
14	Army	27
15	Arizona State	21
16	Villanova	20
17	Princeton	13.5
18	Long Beach State	12.5
18	Northeastern	12.5
20	North Carolina	12.2
21	UC Santa Barbara	11.5
22	Florida State	10
22	Illinois	10
24	Wesleyan (CT)	6.5
25	Oregon State	6
26	Air Force	5
26	Cincinnati	5
26	Harvard	5
29	New Mexico	4
30	Maryland	3
30	Utah	3
32	Denver	2.2
33	Georgia	2
34	Colorado State	1
34	Iowa State (H)	1
34	Kansas State	1
37	Idaho	0.2
37	Rutgers	0.2

== Individual events ==
=== Swimming ===
Event	Champion	Team	Time
50 yard freestyle	Steve Clark	Yale	21.2
100 yard freestyle	Steve Clark (DC)	Yale	46.1
200 yard freestyle	Roy Saari	USC	1:42.9
500 yard freestyle	Roy Saari (DC)	USC	4:43.6
1,650 yard freestyle	Roy Saari (DC)	USC	16:39.9
100 yard backstroke	Gary Dilley	Michigan State	52.6
200 yard backstroke	Gary Dilley	Michigan State	1:56.2
100 yard breaststroke	Bill Craig (DC)	USC	1:00.3
200 yard breaststroke	Tom Tretheway	Indiana	2:10.4
100 yard butterfly	Fred Schmidt	Indiana	51.0
200 yard butterfly	Fred Schmidt (DC)	Indiana	1:51.4
200 yard individual medley	Robert Hopper	Ohio State	1:51.8
400 yard individual medley	Carl Robie	Michigan	4:16.6
400 yard freestyle relay	David Lyons; Douglas Kennedy; Ed Townsend; Steve Clark	Yale (DC)	3:07.2
400 yard medley relay	Glen Hammer; Tom Tretheway; Fred Schmidt; Robert Williamson	Indiana	3:30.7

=== Diving ===
Event	Champion	Team	Score
1 meter diving	Ken Sitzberger	Indiana	511.25
3 meter diving	Ken Sitzberger	Indiana	565.05

== See also ==
- 1965 NCAA College Division swimming and diving championships
- 1965 NAIA swimming and diving championships
- List of college swimming and diving teams
