= Ivan Ferák =

Slovak swimmer

Personal information
- Born: 18 December 1941 (age 84) Bratislava, Czechoslovakia

Sport
- Sport: Swimming

Ivan Ferák (born 18 December 1941) is a Slovak former swimmer. He competed in the men's 200 metre backstroke at the 1964 Summer Olympics.
