= 1966 NCAA University Division swimming and diving championships =

American college aquatic sports competition

- Host city: Colorado Springs, Colorado
- Date(s): March 1966
- Venue(s): Cadet Gymnasium; United States Air Force Academy
- Teams: 36
- Events: 18

The 1966 NCAA University Division swimming and diving championships were contested at the 30th annual swim meet sanctioned and hosted by the NCAA to determine the individual and team national champions of men's collegiate swimming and diving among its University Division member programs in the United States, culminating the 1965–66 NCAA University Division swimming and diving season.

These championships were hosted by the United States Air Force Academy at the Cadet Gymnasium in Colorado Springs, Colorado.

Three-time defending champions USC again topped the team standings, the Trojans' fifth national title and fifth in six seasons.

== Program ==
- One new event was added to the program:
  - 800 yard freestyle relay

== Team standings ==
- (H) = Hosts
- (DC) = Defending champions
- Italics = Debut appearance

Rank	Team	Points
1st place, gold medalist(s)	USC	302
2nd place, silver medalist(s)	Indiana	286
3rd place, bronze medalist(s)	Michigan	253
4	Michigan State	173
5	SMU	143
6	Stanford	115
7	NC State	89
7	UCLA	89
9	Ohio State	80
10	Wisconsin	42
11	Texas	38
12	North Carolina	32
13	Arizona State	29
14	UC Santa Barbara	25
15	Nebraska	24
15	Utah	24
17	Wesleyan (CT)	23
18	Army	22
19	Long Beach State	20
20	Maryland	19
21	Villanova	16
22	Southern Illinois	12
22	Texas Tech	12
22	Tulane	12
25	Northwestern	11
26	Miami (OH)	10
27	Oregon State	9
27	Washington State	9
29	Air Force	8
30	Oklahoma	6
31	Florida State	4
31	Washington	4
33	Kansas	3
33	Miami (FL)	3
35	Navy	2
36	Duke	1

== Individual events ==
=== Swimming ===
Event	Champion	Team	Time
50 yard freestyle	James Van Kennen	Wesleyan (CT)	21.39
100 yard freestyle	Don Roth	UC Santa Barbara	46.87
200 yard freestyle	Roy Saari (DC)	USC	1:44.66
500 yard freestyle	Roy Saari (DC)	USC	4:50.59
1,650 yard freestyle	Roy Saari (DC)	USC	17:08.17
100 yard backstroke	Gary Dilley (DC)	Michigan State	52.39
200 yard backstroke	Gary Dilley (DC)	Michigan State	1:56.41
100 yard breaststroke	Paul Scheerer	Michigan	1:00.43
200 yard breaststroke	Wayne Anderson	USC	2:14.24
100 yard butterfly	Phil Riker	North Carolina	51.19
200 yard butterfly	Carl Robie	Michigan	1:53.80
200 yard individual medley	Bill Utley	Indiana	1:58.55
400 yard individual medley	Ken Webb	Indiana	4:19.81
400 yard freestyle relay	(Canada) Sandy Gilchrist; John Lambert; Ken Krueger; Roy Saar	USC	3:08.05
800 yard freestyle relay	Bill Utley; Scott Cordin; Ken Webb (Australia) Bob Windle	Indiana	7:06.64
400 yard medley relay	Russ Kingery; Paul Scheerer; Tom O'Malley; Ken Wiebeck	Michigan	3:33.36

=== Diving ===
Event	Champion	Team	Score
1 meter diving	Ken Sitzberger (DC)	Indiana	488.50
3 meter diving	Bernie Wrightson	Arizona State	538.90

== See also ==
- 1966 NCAA College Division swimming and diving championships
- 1966 NAIA swimming and diving championships
- List of college swimming and diving teams
