= Charles McCaffree =

Coach for Michigan State University

Charles F. McCaffree Jr.
- McCaffree, while Iowa State Coach, 1941

Biographical details
- Born: October 16, 1907; Canova, South Dakota, US
- Died: December 13, 1980 (aged 73); Austin, Texas, US
- Education: Michigan University

Playing career
- 1927-1930: Michigan University
- Positions: Swimming, Freestyle

Coaching career (HC unless noted)
- 1930-1936: Battle Creek High School; Head Swim Coach
- 1936-1937: Michigan University; Asst. Swim Coach
- 1938-1941: Iowa State University; Head Swim Coach
- 1941-1969: Michigan State University; Head Swim Coach
- 1959: U.S. Pan American team
- 1969-74: Michigan State University; Director of Aquatics
- 1972: U.S. Men’s Olympic team Asst. Manager

Head coaching record
- Overall: 191-58-2 .76 Winning Pct. (MSU); 53-3 (Battle Creek High)

Accomplishments and honors

Championships
- 4 Big Six Conference Championships (1938-41 Iowa State); 8 Central Collegiate Conf. championships 2 Michigan AAU titles 1 National AAU title 1957 Big 10 Conference Championship (Michigan State); 4 Big Six Conf. Championships (Iowa State)

Awards
- 2011 Michigan State Athletic Hall of Fame '65 National Colleg. and Schol. Swim. Trophy; 1976 International Swimming Hall of Fame

Charles McCaffree Jr., known as "Coach Mac", was a collegiate swimmer for Michigan University, and a Hall of Fame Head Coach for Michigan State University from 1941 to 1969, where he led the team to 8 Central Collegiate Conference championships, a National AAU title, and a Big Ten Conference Championship in 1957. He was an Asst. Manager to the U.S. Olympic swim team in 1972, and as a major contributor to the swimming community in the 1960s, served as President of the College Swimming Coaches Association and Secretary of the U.S. Olympic Swim Committee.

== Early life and education ==
Charles F. McCaffree Jr. was born October 16, 1907, in Canova, South Dakota, about 50 miles Northwest of Sioux Falls, to civic leader Charles David McCaffree Sr., a Secretary and board member for the South Dakota Chamber of Commerce, and the South Dakota Manufacturers and Employer's Association. McCaffree Jr.'s mother was Ethel May Clough McCaffree, an officer in Sioux Falls's Order of the Eastern Star, a Women's Masonic organization, and daughter of A. F. Clough, the Cannova Security Bank President.

== Swimming ==
McCaffree began swimming at the Sioux Falls, South Dakota YMCA, served in the cabinet of the YMCA Hi-Y Boys Club, and was elected President to the YMCA Boys Conference, a gathering of 250 boys in Sioux Falls on April 16, 1926. He attended Sioux Falls's Washington High School, where he assumed leadership roles being elected President of the Dramatic Club in 1925 and participating with Washington's Debate Squad.

Active in sports, he played and practiced with Washington High's football team, and lettered in basketball by the Fall of 1925, playing reserve guard and forward his Senior year, and occasionally playing Center. In addition to basketball, he acted as Business Manager for Washington High's Yearbook, the Monogram, and did some editing, preparing him for work as a future Secretary of the Olympic Swim committee, and editor of the NCAA Swimming Guide. He graduated Washington High on the evening of June 4, 1926, acting as Toastmaster to the Senior Banquet on June 2. He competed in swimming competitions at the Sioux Falls YMCA pool during summers away from college, placing second in the 100, and 220-yard swim competitions in the Sioux Falls City Swim Championships in late August 1927.

=== Swimming for Michigan ===
Coach M. Mann, '25

He graduated Michigan University, and specializing in freestyle, swam three years for Hall of Fame Coach Matthew Mann from 1927 to 1930, and also played Water Polo. In March, 1929, he was awarded a monogram for his participation in Michigan's swim team, which was highly competitive. During McCaffree's time swimming for MSU, they won three consecutive conference championships by 1929 going nearly undefeated in conference meets, and won NCAA national championships in both 1927 and 1928. Possibly preparing himself for a future career, during several summer breaks he worked as a lifeguard, and in July 1930 lifeguarded at the Sherman Park pool in Sioux Falls, helping with swimming activities that would later include races. Graduating in 1930 from Michigan with a B.A., McCaffree was awarded a Teaching Certificate in September of that year after attending the Summer session.

== Coaching ==
Immediately after graduating Michigan, McCaffree taught and coached swimming for Michigan's Battle Creek Central High School from 1930 to 1936. Beginning a winning tradition, his High School teams at Battle Creek Central won six consecutive Michigan State Titles and earned a remarkable record of 53 wins and 3 losses.

Looking to coach at the collegiate level, he briefly returned to his alma mater Michigan University as an Assistant Coach for the 1936-1937 season, where he was mentored by his former Hall of Fame Coach Matthew Mann. While he served as Assistant Coach, the University of Michigan won the National NCAA Championship in 1937, giving McCaffree the rare experience of coaching a collegiate team that could dominate the national competition.

McCaffree coached swimming at Iowa State from 1938 to 1941 as Head Swim Coach and led his teams to four consecutive Big 6 Conference Championships as the Big 8 conference was then known. His teams were also responsible for a record of 17-3 in dual meets, and his swimmers set five conference records.

=== Michigan State ===
With McCaffree's success at Iowa State, Michigan State Athletic Director Ralph Young invited him to view Michigan State University's new facilities. McCaffree accepted the Head Coaching position at Michigan State in 1941 replacing thirteen-year coach Russell Daubert, son of a former Iowa State swim coach. McCaffree remained as Michigan State Coach through 1969, establishing an exceptional record. In 1946, Michigan State won a Canadian National Championship, with the team subsequently winning eight consecutive Central Collegiate Conference championships between 1942-1950, and a National American Athletic Union Title. On the state level, MSU captured two Michigan AAU titles. After joining the Big 10 conference, the team won its first conference title in 1957. On an individual level, throughout his career his swimmers won 55 individual Big 10 National Championship titles and he coached a total of 293 Collegiate All-Americans.

McCaffree at 68, circa 1975

In their best performances at the National Collegiate Athletic Association (NCAA) National competitions, MSU had two second-place finishes and three third-place finishes. Outstanding Olympic swimmers coached by McCaffree included 1948 semi-finalist Howard Patterson, 1948 freestylist George Hoogerhyde, who qualified but did not compete, 1972 gold medalist Clarke Scholes, 1968 gold and silver medalist Ken Walsh, 1964 backstroke silver medalist Gary Dilley, and 1992 South African 50-meter freestylist Pete Williams.

After retiring from coaching the swim team at Michigan State in 1969, McCaffree served as Director of the MSU Swimming program from 1969 to 1974. He later served as the MSU Varsity-Alumni "S" Club manager, continuing to reside in East Lansing, Michigan.

=== Swimming community roles ===
From 1961 to 1962, he served as the President of the American Swimming Coaches Association, and from 1960 to 1961, was the President of the College Swimming Coaches Association of America. Extending his role in the swimming community to government service, he served as a staff member with the U.S. Army Special Service Sports School in the summer of 1945. Having gained recognition in national government roles, he was Secretary of the U.S. Olympic Swim Committee in the 1960s, and in a higher profile role, served as the Assistant Manager for the U.S. Olympic Swim Team in 1972. He also held a position as the secretary of the NCAA swimming rules committee and edited the Swimming Guide for the NCAA. A college Water Polo player at Michigan, he was on the U.S. Olympic Water Polo Committee. He served as a member of the National AAU Swimming Committee for men, and as an accomplished organizer and meet director, managed the swim trials for the U.S. Olympic team in 1964, 1968, and 1972.

=== Honors ===
In 1976, McCaffree became a member of the International Swimming Hall of Fame, one of the more exclusive honors for swimming coaches. He was inducted into the American Swimming Coaches Association Hall of Fame in 2002 and was a recipient of the National Collegiate and Scholastic Swimming Trophy in 1965. In 2011, he was inducted into the Michigan State University Athletic Hall of Fame. In 1979, the name of the Intramural West swimming pools at Michigan State were changed to the McCaffree Pools in his honor. The College Swimming Coaches Association of America created the Charles McCaffree award in his honor to recognize a person in the sport of swimming who has "achieved outstanding success outside of the pool." Among his more distinguished and unique honors, he was named to the College Swimming Coaches Association (CSCAA) 100 Greatest Coaches of Past 100 Years.

== Personal life ==
McCaffree died in Austin, Texas at the home of his daughter on December 13, 1980. His health had been affected by a stroke earlier in the Fall of 1980, and he had been receiving treatment at an Austin medical facility. He was married to Esther Ricker of Cadillac, Michigan in December 1933, and remained married throughout his career. The couple had four children. Though they were both born in 1907, Esther, originally of Cadillac, Michigan, graduated from the University of Michigan in 1927, during Charles's Freshman year.
