= Isagi Osumi =

Japanese swimmer

Personal information
- Born: 22 June 1942 (age 84)

Sport
- Sport: Swimming

Isagi Osumi (大隅 潔, Ōsumi Isagi; born 22 June 1942) is a Japanese former swimmer. He competed in the men's 200 metre backstroke at the 1964 Summer Olympics. He later became a reporter for the Sports Nippon newspaper, eventually rising to become a member of the board of directors. He also did sports commentary on television.
