= Howard Patterson =

American swimmer

- Patterson around 20, 1948

Personal information
- Full name: Howard Fenno Patterson
- National team: United States
- Born: September 18, 1927 Saginaw, Michigan, U.S.
- Died: October 28, 2000 (aged 73) Stella, North Carolina, U.S.
- Children: 2 daughters

Sport
- Sport: Swimming
- Strokes: Backstroke
- College team: Michigan State University
- Coach: Charles McCaffree, MSU

Howard Fenno Patterson (September 18, 1927 – October 28, 2000) was an American competition swimmer for Michigan State University who represented the United States in backstroke at the 1948 Summer Olympics in London. He would later work with the Michigan State Liquor Control Commission.

Patterson was born in Saginaw, Michigan on September 18, 1927. Both his parents died in his teens and he suffered from Polio around the age of 10. A number of biographers believe he took up swimming as an escape from a trying childhood. From 1943-45, he swam for Saginaw's Arthur Hill High School, and received All American honors three times. He set a record and won the 100-yard backstroke while swimming for the State Championship in 1944. Swimming for his High School, he was on 200 and 400-yard freestyle relay teams that won State Championships, and established a new national record.

Learning he would be drafted after High School around age 18, he signed up and swim for the U.S. Navy team around 1945. He achieved the rank of 2nd Lieutenant and was a WWII era veteran.

== Michigan State ==
Patterson swam for Michigan State University from 1946-1950 under Hall of Fame Coach Charles McCaffree, a former swimmer for the University of Michigan, during a winning era in the team's history. Patterson helped lead the team to four consecutive Central Collegiate Conference Championships, winning two NCAA backstroke titles at National meets. At the 1946 Big Ten Championship, he improved on the standing 150-yard backstroke record and established a new national collegiate freshman national record in the 300-yard medley relay. At Michigan, Patterson was an All-American a total of five times, and captured the conference championship in the 150-yard backstroke. He set both a national and conference record while winning the 100-yard backstroke in a league meet.

== 1948 Olympics ==
In the 1948 Olympic trials, he finished third in the 100-meter backstroke, qualifying him for a place on the U.S. team.

In the first preliminary heat of the London Olympic games, he finished second in the 100-meter backstroke with a time of 1:09.3, qualifying him for the semi-finals. Patterson competed in the semifinals of the men's 100-meter backstroke, and finished ninth overall with a time of 1:09.9, not making the final heat. Of note, his final time was only one hundreth of a second from a qualifying time, which would have placed him in eighth place.

Patterson later completed an historic swim from St. Ignace, Michigan to Mackinac Island, the only swimmer to successfully complete the distance while performing backstroke.

After his swimming career ended, Patterson served with Detroit's Michigan State Liquor Control Commission. In time, he worked his way into a position as district supervisor. In July, 1967 he was working as a liquor control inspector in Port Huron. After chasing a youth outside a downtown Port Huron area bar where he had been inspecting for ages, he was struck by a man against whom he charged assault.

In addition to his passion for swimming and his enjoyment of golf, he was active in the Masonic Temple and the Shriners.

He retired in Bay City, Michigan and resided in Frankenmuth until eventually relocating to North Carolina with daughter Sheila where he could receive medical treatments for pneumonia and a brain stem infection at East Carolina University in Greenville, North Carolina. His daughter Sheila was a University of Michigan medical school graduate who was an emergency room Doctor, later in private practice. He died on October 28, 2000, in the Stella, North Carolina area, and was survived by two daughters. He was married to Patricia Smith in the mid-1950's. Wilkerson Funeral Home of Greenville provided his funeral arrangements, and he was buried in Bay Pines, National Cemetery in Bay Pines Florida.

== Honors ==
Patterson received the honor of being named to the Saginaw County Sports Hall of Fame in 2009. He was made a member of the Arthur Hill Letterwinner's Hall of Fame in 1965.

== See also ==
- List of Michigan State University people
