= Henri van Osch =

Dutch swimmer

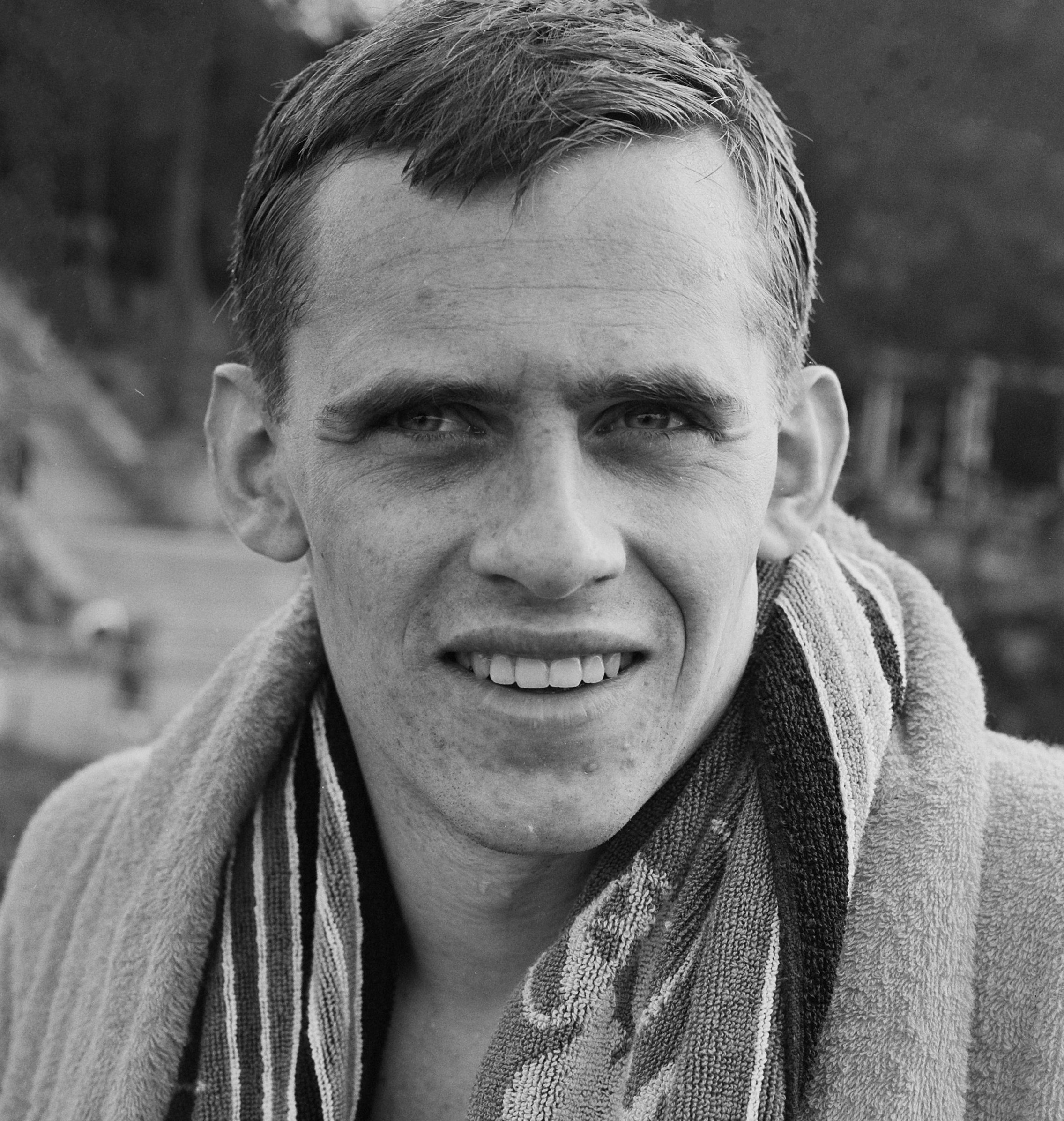
- Henri van Osch in 1965

Personal information
- Born: 12 April 1945 Groningen, the Netherlands
- Died: 22 June 2001 (aged 56) Zwolle, the Netherlands
- Height: 1.78 m (5 ft 10 in)
- Weight: 70 kg (150 lb)

Sport
- Sport: Swimming
- Club: ZCG, Groningen

Henri van Osch (12 April 1945 – 22 June 2001) was a Dutch swimmer. He competed at the 1964 Summer Olympics in the 200 m backststroke event but failed to reach the final. He was married to Henriette D'Engelbronner.
