= Washington University =

Washington University may refer to:

- Washington University in St. Louis, a private research university in Missouri, United States
- University of Washington, a public research university in Seattle, Washington, United States
- George Washington University, a private research university in Washington, D.C., United States
- Washington Medical College, a defunct medical school in Baltimore, Maryland, United States, formerly known as Washington University of Baltimore
- Washington University of Barbados, a defunct medical school in Barbados
- Western Washington University, Bellingham, Washington

== See also ==
- Washington State University, a public research university in Pullman, Washington
- Washington Adventist University, a private university in Takoma Park, Maryland
- Trinity Washington University, a private university in Washington, D.C.
- University of Mary Washington, a public university in Fredericksburg, Virginia
- Washington and Lee University, a private university in Lexington, Virginia
- Washington International University, an unaccredited institution based in the British Virgin Islands
- Washington College (disambiguation)
- Educational institutions named Washington
