= Swimming at the 1968 Summer Olympics – Women's 100 metre freestyle =

Women's 100 metre freestyle at the Games of the XIX Olympiad
- Venue: Alberca Olímpica Francisco Márquez
- Dates: 18 October 1968 (heats & semifinals); 19 October 1968 (finals)
- Competitors: 57 from 27 nations
- Winning time: 1:00.0

Medalists
1st place, gold medalist(s)		Jan Henne; United States
2nd place, silver medalist(s)		Susan Pedersen; United States
3rd place, bronze medalist(s)		Linda Gustavson; United States

The women's 100 metre freestyle event at the 1968 Olympic Games took place between 18 and 19 October. This swimming event used freestyle swimming, which means that the method of the stroke is not regulated (unlike backstroke, breaststroke, and butterfly events). Nearly all swimmers use the front crawl or a variant of that stroke. Because an Olympic-size swimming pool is 50 metres long, this race consisted of two lengths of the pool.

== Results ==
=== Heats ===
Heat 1

Rank	Athlete	Country	Time	Note
1	Claude Mandonnaud	France	1:03.2	
2	Elisabeth Berglund	Sweden	1:03.6	
3	Jenny Steinbeck	Australia	1:03.8	
4	Simone Hanner	France	1:03.8	
5	Helen Elliott	Philippines	1:05.1	
6	Patricia Olano	Colombia	1:05.3	

Heat 2

Rank	Athlete	Country	Time	Note
1	Alexandra Jackson	Great Britain	1:00.5	
2	Nataliya Ustinova	Soviet Union	1:03.8	
3	Miwako Kobayashi	Japan	1:04.2	
4	Mariya Nikolova	Bulgaria	1:05.1	
5	Shen Bao-ni	Taiwan	1:06.7	
6	Ruth Apt	Uruguay	1:07.0	

Heat 3

Rank	Athlete	Country	Time	Note
1	Nel Bos	Netherlands	1:03.0	
2	Mirjana Šegrt	Yugoslavia	1:03.3	
3	Edit Kovács	Hungary	1:03.7	
4	Catherine Grosjean	France	1:04.9	
5	Fiona Kellock	Great Britain	1:05.8	
6	Gillian Treers	Great Britain	1:06.3	
7	Silvana Asturias	Guatemala	1:10.3	

Heat 4

Rank	Athlete	Country	Time	Note
1	Judit Turóczy	Hungary	1:02.1	
2	Shigeko Kawanishi	Japan	1:02.6	
3	Uta Schmuck	East Germany	1:03.1	
4	Lotten Andersson	Sweden	1:04.5	
5	Rosario de Vivanco	Peru	1:04.7	
6	Ingeborg Renner	West Germany	1:05.9	
7	Hedy García	Philippines	1:06.1	
8	Lorna Blake	Puerto Rico	1:13.2	

Heat 5

Rank	Athlete	Country	Time	Note
1	Linda Gustavson	United States	1:00.8	
2	Martina Grunert	East Germany	1:03.2	
3	Maria Strumolo	Italy	1:04.1	
4	Helmi Boxberger	West Germany	1:05.1	
5	Vera Kock	Sweden	1:05.1	
6	Vivian Ortíz	Mexico	1:06.9	
7	Emilia Figueroa	Uruguay	1:07.2	
8	Ana Marcial	Puerto Rico	1:10.1	

Heat 6

Rank	Athlete	Country	Time	Note
1	Sue Pedersen	United States	1:01.5	
2	Roswitha Krause	East Germany	1:03.3	
3	Lynne Watson	Australia	1:03.5	
4	Magdolna Patóh	Hungary	1:03.8	
5	Ana Boban	Yugoslavia	1:05.4	
6	Toos Beumer	Netherlands	1:06.1	
7	Lylian Castillo	Uruguay	1:08.3	
8	Rosa Hasbún	El Salvador	1:10.0	

Heat 7

Rank	Athlete	Country	Time	Note
1	Marion Lay	Canada	1:00.6	
2	Lidiya Hrebets	Soviet Union	1:03.3	
3	Oľga Kozičová	Czechoslovakia	1:03.3	
4	Zoya Dus	Soviet Union	1:04.2	
5	Carmen Ferracuti	El Salvador	1:08.5	
6	Nguyễn Minh Tam	Vietnam	1:09.5	

Heat 8

Rank	Athlete	Country	Time	Note
1	Jan Henne	United States	1:00.1	
2	Lyn Bell	Australia	1:01.9	
3	Oei Liana	Taiwan	1:03.0	
4	Heidi Reineck	West Germany	1:04.2	
5	Marcia Arriaga	Mexico	1:05.4	
6	Mirjam van Hemert	Netherlands	1:06.1	
7	Hrafnhildur Guðmundsdóttir	Iceland	1:06.3	
8	Kristina Moir	Puerto Rico	1:07.9	

=== Semifinals ===
Heat 1

Rank	Athlete	Country	Time	Notes
1	Marion Lay	Canada	1:00.7	Q
2	Mirjana Šegrt	Yugoslavia	1:01.9	Q
3	Martina Grunert	East Germany	1:02.2	Q
4	Lyn Bell	Australia	1:02.4	
5	Jenny Steinbeck	Australia	1:02.6	
6	Oei Liana	Taiwan	1:02.8	
7	Lynne Watson	Australia	1:02.9	
8	Magdolna Patóh	Hungary	1:03.8	

Heat 2

Rank	Athlete	Country	Time	Notes
1	Susan Pedersen	United States	1:00.2	Q
2	Alexandra Jackson	Great Britain	1:00.6	Q
3	Roswitha Krause	East Germany	1:02.4	
4	Uta Schmuck	East Germany	1:02.8	
5	Shigeko Kawanishi	Japan	1:03.0	
6	Lidiya Hrebets	Soviet Union	1:03.3	
7	Edit Kovács	Hungary	1:03.5	
8	Natalya Ustinova	Soviet Union	1:05.0	

Heat 3

Rank	Athlete	Country	Time	Notes
1	Jan Henne	United States	1:00.5	Q
2	Linda Gustavson	United States	1:00.6	Q
3	Judit Turóczy	Hungary	1:01.8	Q
4	Oľga Kozičová	Czechoslovakia	1:02.6	
5	Petronella Bos	Netherlands	1:02.8	
5	Claude Mandonnaud	France	1:02.8	
7	Elisabeth Berglund	Sweden	1:03.5	
8	Simone Hanner	France	1:04.8	

=== Final ===
Rank	Athlete	Country	Time	Notes
1	Jan Henne	United States	1:00.0	
2	Susan Pedersen	United States	1:00.3	
3	Linda Gustavson	United States	1:00.3	
4	Marion Lay	Canada	1:00.5	
5	Martina Grunert	East Germany	1:01.0	
6	Alexandra Jackson	Great Britain	1:01.0	
7	Mirjana Šegrt	Yugoslavia	1:01.5	
8	Judit Turóczy	Hungary	1:01.6	
