= Swimming at the 1968 Summer Olympics – Women's 200 metre freestyle =

Women's 200 metre freestyle at the Games of the XIX Olympiad
- Venue: Alberca Olímpica Francisco Márquez
- Date: 21 October 1968 (heats); 22 October 1968 (final)
- Competitors: 39 from 23 nations
- Winning time: 2:10.5 OR

Medalists
1st place, gold medalist(s)		Debbie Meyer	United States
2nd place, silver medalist(s)		Jan Henne	United States
3rd place, bronze medalist(s)		Jane Barkman	United States

The inaugural women's 200 metre freestyle event at the 1968 Olympic Games took place between 21 and 22 October. This swimming event used freestyle swimming, which means that the method of the stroke is not regulated (unlike backstroke, breaststroke, and butterfly events). Nearly all swimmers use the front crawl or a variant of that stroke. Because an Olympic size swimming pool is 50 metres long, this race consisted of four lengths of the pool.

== Results ==
=== Heats ===
Heat 1

Rank	Athlete	Country	Time	Note
1	Debbie Meyer	United States	2:13.1	
2	Oľga Kozičová	Czechoslovakia	2:16.1	
3	Susan Williams	Great Britain	2:20.4	
4	Heidi Reineck	West Germany	2:21.4	
5	Danièle Dorléans	France	2:21.7	
6	Kirsten Strange-Campbell	Denmark	2:30.5	

Heat 2

Rank	Athlete	Country	Time	Note
1	Lyn Bell	Australia	2:15.7	
2	Claude Mandonnaud	France	2:15.8	
3	Jenny Steinbeck	Australia	2:18.8	
4	Helen Elliott	Philippines	2:25.4	
5	Novella Calligaris	Italy	2:26.3	
6	Marcia Arriaga	Mexico	2:27.0	
7	Shen Bao-ni	Taiwan	2:34.0	
8	Lorna Blake	Puerto Rico	2:43.8	

Heat 3

Rank	Athlete	Country	Time	Note
1	Jan Henne	United States	2:13.8	
2	Marion Lay	Canada	2:16.7	
3	María Teresa Ramírez	Mexico	2:17.5	
4	Alexandra Jackson	Great Britain	2:19.2	
5	Kristina Moir	Puerto Rico	2:23.1	
6	Donatella Ferracuti	El Salvador	2:28.2	
7	Hrafnhildur Guðmundsdóttir	Iceland	2:28.5	

Heat 4

Rank	Athlete	Country	Time	Note
1	Gabriele Wetzko	East Germany	2:14.7	
2	Angela Coughlan	Canada	2:20.9	
3	Maria Strumolo	Italy	2:23.3	
4	Aloisia Bauer	West Germany	2:24.5	
5	Emilia Figueroa	Uruguay	2:27.4	

Heat 5

Rank	Athlete	Country	Time	Note
1	Jane Barkman	United States	2:13.6	
2	Marie-José Kersaudy	France	2:18.0	
3	Elisabeth Berglund	Sweden	2:19.7	
4	Tamara Sosnova	Soviet Union	2:23.5	
5	Patricia Olano	Colombia	2:25.1	
6	Silvana Asturias	Guatemala	2:30.7	
7	Lylian Castillo	Uruguay	2:34.1	

Heat 6

Rank	Athlete	Country	Time	Note
1	Mirjana Šegrt	Yugoslavia	2:15.7	
2	Oei Liana	Taiwan	2:16.3	
3	Julie McDonald	Australia	2:19.9	
4	Consuelo Changanaqui	Peru	2:20.7	
5	Rosario de Vivanco	Peru	2:22.2	
6	Sally Davison	Great Britain	2:26.1	

=== Final ===
Rank	Athlete	Country	Time	Notes
1	Debbie Meyer	United States	2:10.5	OR
2	Jan Henne	United States	2:11.0	
3	Jane Barkman	United States	2:11.2	
4	Gabriele Wetzko	East Germany	2:12.3	
5	Mirjana Šegrt	Yugoslavia	2:13.3	
6	Claude Mandonnaud	France	2:14.9	
7	Lyn Bell	Australia	2:15.1	
8	Olga Kozičová	Czechoslovakia	2:16.0	

Key: OR = Olympic record
