= Swimming at the 1968 Summer Olympics – Women's 4 × 100 metre freestyle relay =

Women's 4 × 100 metre freestyle relay at the Games of the XIX Olympiad
- Venue: Alberca Olímpica Francisco Márquez
- Dates: 26 October 1968 (heats & final)
- Competitors: 69 from 15 nations
- Winning time: 4:02.5 OR

Medalists
1st place, gold medalist(s)		Jane Barkman, Linda Gustavson, Sue Pedersen, Jan Henne	United States
2nd place, silver medalist(s)		Gabriele Wetzko, Roswitha Krause, Uta Schmuck, Martina Grunert	East Germany
3rd place, bronze medalist(s)		Angela Coughlan, Marilyn Corson, Elaine Tanner, Marion Lay	Canada

The women's 4 × 100 metre freestyle relay event at the 1968 Olympic Games took place October 26. The relay featured teams of four swimmers each swimming two lengths of the 50 m pool freestyle.

== Results ==
=== Heats ===
Heat 1

Place	Swimmers	Time	Notes
1	Jenny Steinbeck, Lynne Watson, Lyn Bell, Julie McDonald (AUS)	4:12.0	
2	Marie-José Kersaudy, Simone Hanner, Danièle Dorléans, Claude Mandonnaud (FRA)	4:15.4	
3	Zoya Dus, Tamara Sosnova, Nataliya Ustinova, Lidiya Hrebets (URS)	4:17.1	
4	Elisabeth Berglund, Elisabeth Ljunggren-Morris, Lotten Andersson, Ingrid Gustavsson (SWE)	4:18.2	
5	Heidi Reineck, Aloisia Bauer, Ingeborg Renner, Helmi Boxberger (FRG)	4:19.4	
6	María Teresa Ramírez, Laura Vaca, Marcia Arriaga, Norma Amezcua (MEX)	4:21.9	

Heat 2

Place	Swimmers	Time	Notes
1	Jane Barkman, Linda Gustavson, Sue Pedersen, Jan Henne (USA)	4:11.1	
2	Edit Kovács, Magdolna Patóh, Andrea Gyarmati, Judit Turóczy (HUN)	4:13.6	
3	Shigeko Kawanishi, Yoshimi Nishigawa, Miwako Kobayashi, Yumiko Ono (JPN)	4:14.5	NR
4	Hella Rentema, Bep Weeteling, Mirjam van Hemert, Nel Bos (NED)	4:16.7	
5	María Moreño, Rosa Hasbún, Donatella Ferracuti, Carmen Ferracuti (ESA)	4:39.8	

Heat 3

Place	Swimmers	Time	Notes
1	Gabriele Wetzko, Roswitha Krause, Uta Schmuck, Gabriele Perthes (GDR)	4:10.3	
2	Angela Coughlan, Marilyn Corson, Elaine Tanner, Marion Lay (CAN)	4:14.1	
3	Shelagh Ratcliffe, Fiona Kellock, Susan Williams, Alexandra Jackson (GBR)	4:16.3	
4	Emilia Figueroa, Ruth Apt, Felicia Ospitaletche, Lylian Castillo (URU)	4:33.4	

=== Final ===
Place	Swimmers	Time	Notes
1	Jane Barkman, Linda Gustavson, Sue Pedersen, Jan Henne (USA)	4:02.5	OR
2	Gabriele Wetzko, Roswitha Krause, Uta Schmuck, Martina Grunert (GDR)	4:05.7	
3	Angela Coughlan, Marilyn Corson, Elaine Tanner, Marion Lay (CAN)	4:07.2	
4	Jenny Steinbeck, Susan Eddy, Lynne Watson, Lyn Bell (AUS)	4:08.7	
5	Edit Kovács, Magdolna Patóh, Andrea Gyarmati, Judit Turóczy (HUN)	4:11.0	
6	Shigeko Kawanishi, Yoshimi Nishigawa, Yasuko Fujii, Miwako Kobayashi (JPN)	4:13.6	NR
7	Shelagh Ratcliffe, Fiona Kellock, Susan Williams, Alexandra Jackson (GBR)	4:18.0	
	Marie-José Kersaudy, Simone Hanner, Danièle Dorléans, Claude Mandonnaud (FRA)	DSQ	
