= Swimming at the 1968 Summer Olympics – Women's 400 metre freestyle =

Women's 400 metre freestyle at the Games of the XIX Olympiad
- Venue: Alberca Olímpica Francisco Márquez
- Date: 19 October 1968 (heats); 20 October 1968 (final)
- Competitors: 30 from 17 nations
- Winning time: 4:31.8 OR

Medalists
1st place, gold medalist(s)		Debbie Meyer	United States
2nd place, silver medalist(s)		Linda Gustavson	United States
3rd place, bronze medalist(s)		Karen Moras	Australia

The women's 400 metre freestyle event at the 1968 Olympic Games took place between 19 and 20 October. This swimming event used freestyle swimming, which means that the method of the stroke is not regulated (unlike backstroke, breaststroke, and butterfly events). Nearly all swimmers use the front crawl or a variant of that stroke. Because an Olympic-size swimming pool is 50 metres long, this race consisted of eight lengths of the pool.

== Results ==
=== Heats ===
Heat 1

Rank	Athlete	Country	Time	Note
1	María Teresa Ramírez	Mexico	4:43.9	
2	Gabriele Wetzko	East Germany	4:49.8	
3	Laura Vaca	Mexico	4:53.3	
4	Helen Elliott	Philippines	4:59.9	
5	Shen Bao-ni	Chinese Taipei	5:41.8	

Heat 2

Rank	Athlete	Country	Time	Note
1	Debbie Meyer	United States	4:35.0	
2	Norma Amezcua	Mexico	5:00.5	
3	Dominique Mollier	France	5:00.5	
4	Sheila Clayton	Great Britain	5:08.0	

Heat 3

Rank	Athlete	Country	Time	Note
1	Pam Kruse	United States	4:45.2	
2	Marjatta Hara	Finland	4:53.0	
3	Olga de Angulo	Colombia	5:08.6	
4	Sally Davison	Great Britain	5:11.2	
5	Lylian Castillo	Uruguay	5:30.2	
6	Lorna Blake	Puerto Rico	5:54.7	

Heat 4

Rank	Athlete	Country	Time	Note
1	Linda Gustavson	United States	4:41.4	
2	Marie-José Kersaudy	France	4:57.3	
3	Kristina Moir	Puerto Rico	4:57.7	
4	Susan Williams	Great Britain	5:02.7	
5	Emilia Figueroa	Uruguay	5:21.0	

Heat 5

Rank	Athlete	Country	Time	Note
1	Karen Moras	Australia	4:39.6	
2	Elisabeth Ljunggren-Morris	Sweden	4:51.6	
3	Novella Calligaris	Italy	4:59.4	
4	Consuelo Changanaqui	Peru	5:02.9	
5	Silvana Asturias	Guatemala	5:25.6	

Heat 6

Rank	Athlete	Country	Time	Note
1	Angela Coughlan	Canada	4:47.4	
2	Denise Langford	Australia	4:52.2	
3	Eva Sigg	Finland	4:58.5	
4	Christine Deakes	Australia	5:01.5	
5	Patricia Olano	Colombia	5:01.8	

=== Final ===
Rank	Athlete	Country	Time	Notes
1	Debbie Meyer	United States	4:31.8	OR
2	Linda Gustavson	United States	4:35.5	
3	Karen Moras	Australia	4:37.0	
4	Pam Kruse	United States	4:37.2	
5	Gabriele Wetzko	East Germany	4:40.2	
6	María Teresa Ramírez	Mexico	4:42.2	
7	Angela Coughlan	Canada	4:51.9	
8	Elisabeth Ljunggren-Morris	Sweden	4:53.8	

Key: OR = Olympic record
