= Swimming at the 1968 Summer Olympics – Women's 800 metre freestyle =

Women's 800 metre freestyle at the Games of the XIX Olympiad
- Venue: Alberca Olímpica Francisco Márquez
- Date: 22 October 1968 (heats); 24 October 1968 (final)
- Competitors: 26 from 16 nations
- Winning time: 9:24.0 OR

Medalists
1st place, gold medalist(s)		Debbie Meyer	United States
2nd place, silver medalist(s)		Pam Kruse	United States
3rd place, bronze medalist(s)		Maria Teresa Ramírez	Mexico

The women's 800 metre freestyle event at the 1968 Olympic Games took place between 22 and 24 October. This swimming event used freestyle swimming, which means that the method of the stroke is not regulated (unlike backstroke, breaststroke, and butterfly events). Nearly all swimmers use the front crawl or a variant of that stroke. Because an Olympic size swimming pool is 50 metres long, this race consisted of sixteen lengths of the pool.

The winning margin was 11.7 seconds which as of 2023 remains the greatest winning margin in this event at the Olympics and one of only two occasions when the event was won by more than 7 seconds, the other time being in 2016.

== Results ==
=== Heats ===
Heat 1

Rank	Athlete	Country	Time	Note
1	Debbie Meyer	United States	9:42.8	OR
2	Angela Coughlan	Canada	10:00.2	
3	Sigrid Goral	East Germany	10:09.3	
4	Kristina Moir	Puerto Rico	10:24.5	
5	Helen Elliott	Philippines	10:32.9	

Heat 2

Rank	Athlete	Country	Time	Note
1	Karen Moras	Australia	9:38.3	OR
2	Denise Langford	Australia	9:59.3	
3	Laura Vaca	Mexico	10:01.8	
4	Tui Shipston	New Zealand	10:28.0	
5	Norma Amezcua	Mexico	10:31.6	
6	Emilia Figueroa	Uruguay	10:57.7	

Heat 3

Rank	Athlete	Country	Time	Note
1	Pam Kruse	United States	9:49.8	
2	Elisabeth Ljunggren-Morris	Sweden	10:07.5	
3	Susan Williams	Great Britain	10:17.6	
4	Sabine Rantzsch	East Germany	10:18.4	
5	Lylian Castillo	Uruguay	11:19.1	

Heat 4

Rank	Athlete	Country	Time	Note
1	Christine Deakes	Australia	10:06.7	
2	Marie-José Kersaudy	France	10:19.8	
3	Novella Calligaris	Italy	10:21.0	
4	Patricia Olano	Colombia	10:44.1	
5	Silvana Asturias	Guatemala	11:12.5	

Heat 5

Rank	Athlete	Country	Time	Note
1	María Teresa Ramírez	Mexico	9:46.4	
2	Patty Caretto	United States	9:46.4	
3	Dominique Mollier	France	10:21.4	
4	Marjatta Hara	Finland	10:23.3	
5	Olga de Angulo	Colombia	10:40.5	

=== Final ===
Rank	Athlete	Country	Time	Notes
1	Debbie Meyer	United States	9:24.0	OR
2	Pam Kruse	United States	9:35.7	
3	Maria Teresa Ramírez	Mexico	9:38.5	
4	Karen Moras	Australia	9:38.6	
5	Patty Caretto	United States	9:51.3	
6	Angela Coughlan	Canada	9:56.4	
7	Denise Langford	Australia	9:56.7	
8	Laura Vaca	Mexico	10:02.5	

Key: OR = Olympic record
