= Uruguay at the 1968 Summer Olympics =

- IOC code: URU (URG used at these Games)
- NOC: Uruguayan Olympic Committee

in Mexico City
- Competitors: 27 in 8 sports
- Medals: Gold 0 Silver 0 Bronze 0 Total 0

Summer Olympics appearances (overview)
- 1924; 1928; 1932; 1936; 1948; 1952; 1956; 1960; 1964; 1968; 1972; 1976; 1980; 1984; 1988; 1992; 1996; 2000; 2004; 2008; 2012; 2016; 2020; 2024; 2028

Uruguay competed at the 1968 Summer Olympics in Mexico City, Mexico. 27 competitors, 21 men and 6 women, took part in 31 events in 8 sports.

== Athletics ==
- Albertino Etchechury
- Armando González
- Josefa Vicent

== Boxing ==
- Mario Benítez
- Juan Carlos Rivero
- Carlos Alberto Casal
- Nolberto Freitas

== Cycling ==
Five cyclists represented Uruguay in 1968.

Team time trial

- Walter Garre
- Luis Sosa
- René Deceja
- Jorge Jukich

1000m time trial

- Luis Barruffa

== Fencing ==
One fencer represented Uruguay in 1968.

Men's foil

- Alberto Varela

Men's épée

- Alberto Varela

== Rowing ==
- Emilio Ahlers
- José Ahlers
- Luis Colman
- Esteban Masseilot
- José Sigot

== Sailing ==
- Fernando Thode

== Shooting ==
Three shooters, all men, represented Uruguay in 1968.

50 m pistol

- Enrique Barragán
- Walter Vera

Trap

- Arturo Porro

== Swimming ==
Women

Athlete	Event	Heat		Semifinal		Final	
Athlete	Event	Time	Rank	Time	Rank	Time	Rank
Ruth Apt	100 m freestyle	1:07.0	48	Did not advance			
Lylian Castillo	100 m freestyle	1:08.3	51	Did not advance			
Mónica E. Figueroa	100 m freestyle	1:07.2	49	Did not advance			
Lylian Castillo	200 m freestyle	2:34.1	38	—N/a		Did not advance	
Mónica E. Figueroa	200 m freestyle	2:27.4	32	—N/a		Did not advance	
Lylian Castillo	400 m freestyle	5:30.2	28	—N/a		Did not advance	
Mónica E. Figueroa	400 m freestyle	5:21.0	26	—N/a		Did not advance	
Lylian Castillo	800 m freestyle	11:19.1	26	—N/a		Did not advance	
Mónica E. Figueroa	800 m freestyle	10:57.7	24	—N/a		Did not advance	
Felicia Ospitaletche	100 m backstroke	1:17.7	36	Did not advance			
Felicia Ospitaletche	200 m backstroke	2:51.4	28	—N/a		Did not advance	
Ana María Norbis	100 m breaststroke	1:17.4 OR	1 Q	1:16.7 OR	1 Q	1:17.3	8
Ana María Norbis	200 m breaststroke	2:49.4	3 Q	—N/a		2:51.9	8
Ruth Apt	100 m butterfly	1:15.3	25	Did not advance			
Ruth Apt	200 m individual medley	2:45.9	32	—N/a		Did not advance	
Felicia Ospitaletche	200 m individual medley	2:47.8	33	—N/a		Did not advance	
Ruth Apt	400 m individual medley	6:04.5	25	—N/a		Did not advance	
Mónica E. Figueroa; Ruth Apt; Felicia Ospitaletche; Lylian Castillo	4 × 100 m freestyle relay	4:33.4	14	—N/a		Did not advance	
Felicia Ospitaletche; Ana María Norbis; Ruth Apt; Mónica E. Figueroa	4 × 100 m medley relay	4:56.0	13	—N/a		Did not advance	
