= Alberto Varela =

Alberto Varela is the name of:

- Alberto Varela (businessman), Argentine businessman and founder of Inner Mastery
- Alberto Varela (fencer), Uruguayan fencer
