= Aloisia =

Aloisia is a given name. Notable people with the name include:

- Aloisia Bauer (born 1951), German swimmer
- Aloisia Brial (died 1972), Uvean queen
- Aloisia Kirschner (1854–1934), Austrian novelist

== See also ==
- Aloysia (disambiguation)
- Aloisea Inyumba
