= Jane Barkman =

American swimmer

Personal information
- Full name: Jane Louise Barkman
- National team: United States
- Born: September 20, 1951 (age 74) Bryn Mawr, Pennsylvania, U.S.
- Height: 5 ft 7 in (1.70 m)
- Weight: 134 lb (61 kg)

Sport
- Sport: Swimming
- Strokes: Freestyle
- Club: Vesper Boat Club
- College team: Salem College
- Coach: Mary Freeman Kelly; George Breen
Medal record
Women's swimming
Representing the United States
Olympic Games
Gold medal – first place	1968 Mexico City	4x100 m freestyle
Gold medal – first place	1972 Munich	4x100 m freestyle
Bronze medal – third place	1968 Mexico City	200 m freestyle

Jane Louise Barkman (born September 20, 1951), also known by her married name Jane Brown, is an American former swimmer, two-time Olympic champion, and former world record-holder.

== Competitive swimming career ==
Barkman's earliest coaches include Bob Fitzgerald who mentored her when she was six-years-old, Bill Taylor, who worked with her from ages seven-eleven. Barkman started more competitive age group swimming at Philadelphia's Vesper Boat Club under Hall of Fame swimming coach Mary Freeman Kelly.

== 1967 AAU championships ==
Swimming for the Vesper Club in late March 1967, she set a record of 5:21.7 in the 500-yard freestyle at the Middle Atlantic AAU Swimming Championships, also winning the 100-yard freestyle, and the 400-yard freestyle relay and had previously set a AAU District record in the 100-yard breaststroke of 1:12.0 in 1965 and a 200 I.M meet record in 1966.

== 68 Olympic medalist ==
Preparing for the 1968 Summer Olympics in Mexico City, Jane trained four hours a day Monday-Friday, and three hours on Saturday, as well as doing pully weights at home. She attended the Olympic trials at Los Angeles Stadium seeded first in her event. She was disappointed to finish fourth in the 100-meter freestyle, but still qualified for the event, and the relays. She also qualified in the trials for the 200-meter freestyle, though it was not one of her better events.

=== '68 Olympic gold and bronze medals ===
In the finals, she won a gold medal as a member of the winning U.S. team in the women's 4×100-meter freestyle relay, together with teammates Linda Gustavson, Sue Pedersen, and Jan Henne. She and her relay teammates set a new Olympic record of 4:02.5 in the event final. Individually, she also received a bronze medal for her third-place performance in the women's 200-meter freestyle. Barkman finished behind Debbie Meyer, and Jan Henne, completing an American sweep of the event.

== Attending Salem College ==
She attended Salem College, in Winston-Salem, South Carolina, beginning in 1969, but swam with the team from 1970 to 1974, taking off to train for the 1972 Olympics, and training as well for a period with the Wake Forest men's team in the Fall of 1970. She continued to train with Head Coach George Breen at Vesper Boat Club.

== 72 Olympic medalist ==
At the 1972 Summer Olympics in Munich, she was also part of the U.S. team that won the gold medal in the women's 4×100-meter freestyle relay, including Sandy Neilson, Jenny Kemp and Shirley Babashoff. Neilson, Kemp, Barkman and Babashoff set a new world record of 3:55.19 in the final, narrowly edging the East German team. Barkman served as a Tri-Captain of the 1972 team and was a Torchbearer carrying the torch en route to the 1996 Atlanta Olympic Games.

== Coaching ==
Barkman was formerly the coach of the Princeton Tigers women's swimming and diving team at Princeton University. She is the mother of two sons and a daughter. She now resides in a small town in Pennsylvania and is a kindergarten and first grade teacher.

== See also ==
- List of Olympic medalists in swimming (women)
- World record progression 4 × 100 metres medley relay
