= Karen Moras =

Australian swimmer

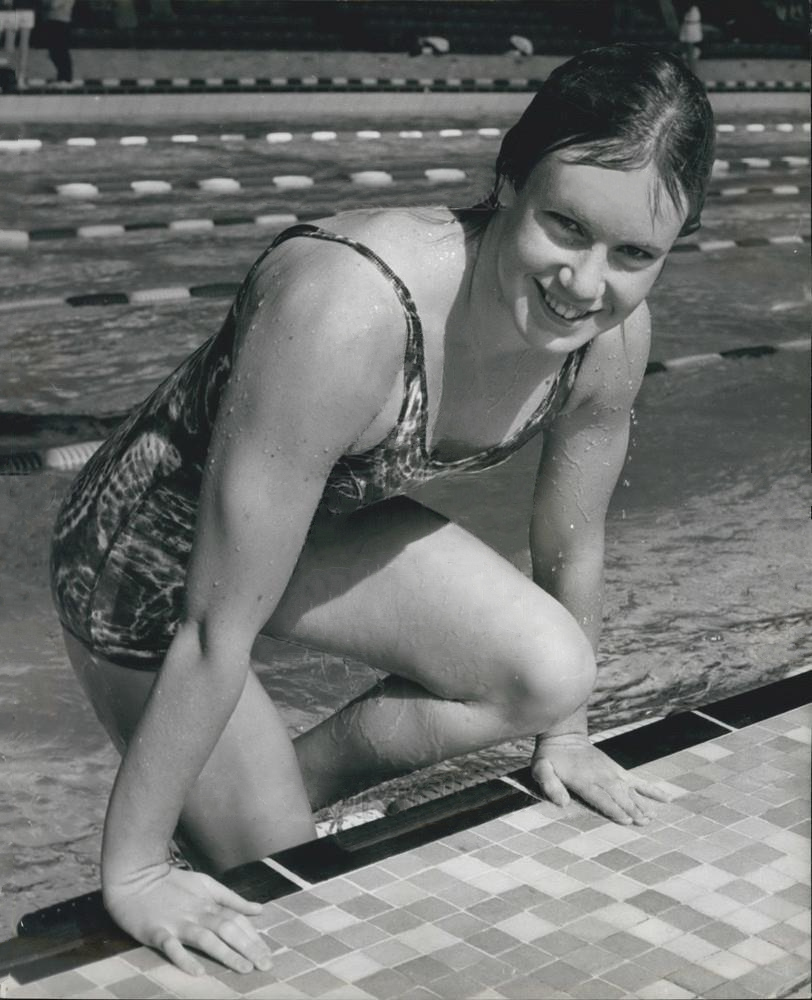
- Moras in 1971

Personal information
- Full name: Karen Lynne Moras
- National team: Australia
- Born: 6 January 1954 (age 72) Ryde, New South Wales
- Height: 1.68 m (5 ft 6 in)
- Weight: 53 kg (117 lb)

Sport
- Sport: Swimming
- Strokes: Freestyle
Medal record
Representing Australia
Olympic Games
| Bronze medal – third place | 1968 Mexico City | 400 m freestyle |
British Commonwealth Games
| Gold medal – first place | 1970 Edinburgh | 200 m freestyle |
| Gold medal – first place | 1970 Edinburgh | 400 m freestyle |
| Gold medal – first place | 1970 Edinburgh | 800 m freestyle |

Karen Lynne Moras OAM (born 6 January 1954), also known by her married name Karen Stephenson, is an Australian distance freestyle swimmer of the 1960s and 1970s who won a bronze medal in the 400-metre freestyle at the 1968 Summer Olympics. Although she set multiple world records she peaked between Olympics and was unable to capture gold at Olympic level.

Trained by Forbes Carlile, and making her international debut as a 14-year-old prodigy, Moras was expected to win medals at the 1968 Mexico City Olympics. She struggled, however, to adapt to the rarefied air at high altitude conditions and required medical treatment for breathing difficulties and hyperventilation. Despite this Moras managed to salvage a bronze medal in the 400-metre freestyle, behind the American duo of Debbie Meyer and Linda Gustavson. She nearly claimed a second bronze in the 800-metre freestyle, being beaten into fourth by 0.1 of a second by Mexico's Maria Teresa Ramírez who was much more acclimated to the local conditions.

In 1970 Moras broke the 800-metre freestyle world record at the Australian Championships, qualifying for the 1970 Commonwealth Games in Edinburgh. She was the dominant swimmer at the Games, winning the 200-, 400- and 800-metre freestyle events, cutting 7 seconds off her 800-metre freestyle world record in the process. Her winning time in the 400-metre freestyle was less than a second outside Meyer's world record.

On Moras' return to Australia a new swimmer, Shane Gould, had joined Carlile's group and by the end of the year Gould had defeated Moras in state-level carnivals. In 1971, after Gould claimed every freestyle world record from 100-metre to 1500-metre, Moras left Carlile's group to train under Don Talbot, feeling that Carlile was spending too much time focusing on Gould.

Moras qualified to represent Australia at the 1972 Summer Olympics in Munich in the 400- and 800-metre freestyle and the 400-metre individual medley, but failed to reach the final in any of the events. She retired from competitive swimming after the Olympics. Her sister, Narelle Moras, also competed at the Munich Games, finishing eighth in the 800-metre freestyle.

She currently works at Presbyterian Ladies' College in Croydon as part of the swimming coaching and staff at their Aquatic Centre, as Aquatic Director.

She was inducted into the Sport Australia Hall of Fame in 1985.

== See also ==
- List of Olympic medalists in swimming (women)
- List of Commonwealth Games medallists in swimming (women)
- World record progression 400 metres freestyle
- World record progression 800 metres freestyle

== Bibliography ==
- Andrews, Malcolm (2000). Australia at the Olympic Games. Sydney, New South Wales: ABC Books. p. 306. ISBN 0-7333-0884-8.
