= Duss =

Duss may refer to:

- Duss, Gotland, a populated place in Sweden
- Ad Duss, a village in Oman
- Antoine Duss (1840–1924), Swiss botanist
- Vera Duss (1910–2005), American–French doctor and Roman Catholic nun

== See also ==
- Dus (disambiguation)
