= Jan Henne =

American swimmer (born 1947)

Personal information
- Full name: Jan Margo Henne
- National team: United States
- Born: August 11, 1947 (age 78) Oakland, California, U.S.
- Height: 5 ft 7 in (1.70 m)
- Weight: 141 lb (64 kg)

Sport
- Sport: Swimming
- Strokes: Freestyle
- Club: Santa Clara Swim Club
- College team: Arizona State University (ASU)
- Coach: Mona Plummer (ASU)
Medal record
Women's swimming
Representing the United States
Women's Olympic Games
| Gold medal – first place | 1968 Mexico City | 100 m freestyle |
| Gold medal – first place | 1968 Mexico City | 4x100 m freestyle |
| Silver medal – second place | 1968 Mexico City | 200 m freestyle |
| Bronze medal – third place | 1968 Mexico City | 200 m medley |

Jan Margo Henne (born August 11, 1947), also known by her married name Jan Hawkins, is an American former competition swimmer, Olympic champion, and former world record-holder.

At the 1968 Summer Olympics in Mexico City, she received four medals including two golds. Henne won a gold medal by swimming the anchor leg for the winning U.S. team in the women's 4×100-meter freestyle relay. She and her relay teammates Jane Barkman, Linda Gustavson and Susan Pedersen set a new Olympic record of 4:02.5 in the event final. She also swam for the gold medal-winning U.S. team in the preliminary heats of the 4×100-meter medley relay, but, under the international swimming rules in effect in 1960, did not receive a medal because she did not participate in the event final.

Individually, Henne won a gold medal for her first-place finish in the women's 100-meter freestyle. She also received a silver medal for her runner-up finish in the 200-meter freestyle, and a bronze for her third-place performance in the 200-meter individual medley.

After the 1968 Olympics, Henne attended Arizona State University, where she swam for the Arizona State Sun Devils swimming and diving team in Association for Intercollegiate Athletics for Women (AIAW) competition from 1968 to 1972 under Head Women's Coach Mona Plummer. Henne was a member of the Sun Devils' AIAW national championship teams in 1969, 1970 and 1971, and won individual AIAW national championships in the 100-yard breaststroke, 200-yard freestyle and 4x100-yard freestyle relay in 1970. She was inducted into Arizona State University's sports hall of fame in 1976.

Henne was inducted into the International Swimming Hall of Fame as an "Honor Swimmer" in 1979.

== See also ==
- List of Arizona State University alumni
- List of Olympic medalists in swimming (women)
- World record progression 4 × 100 metres freestyle relay
