= Debbie Meyer =

American swimmer

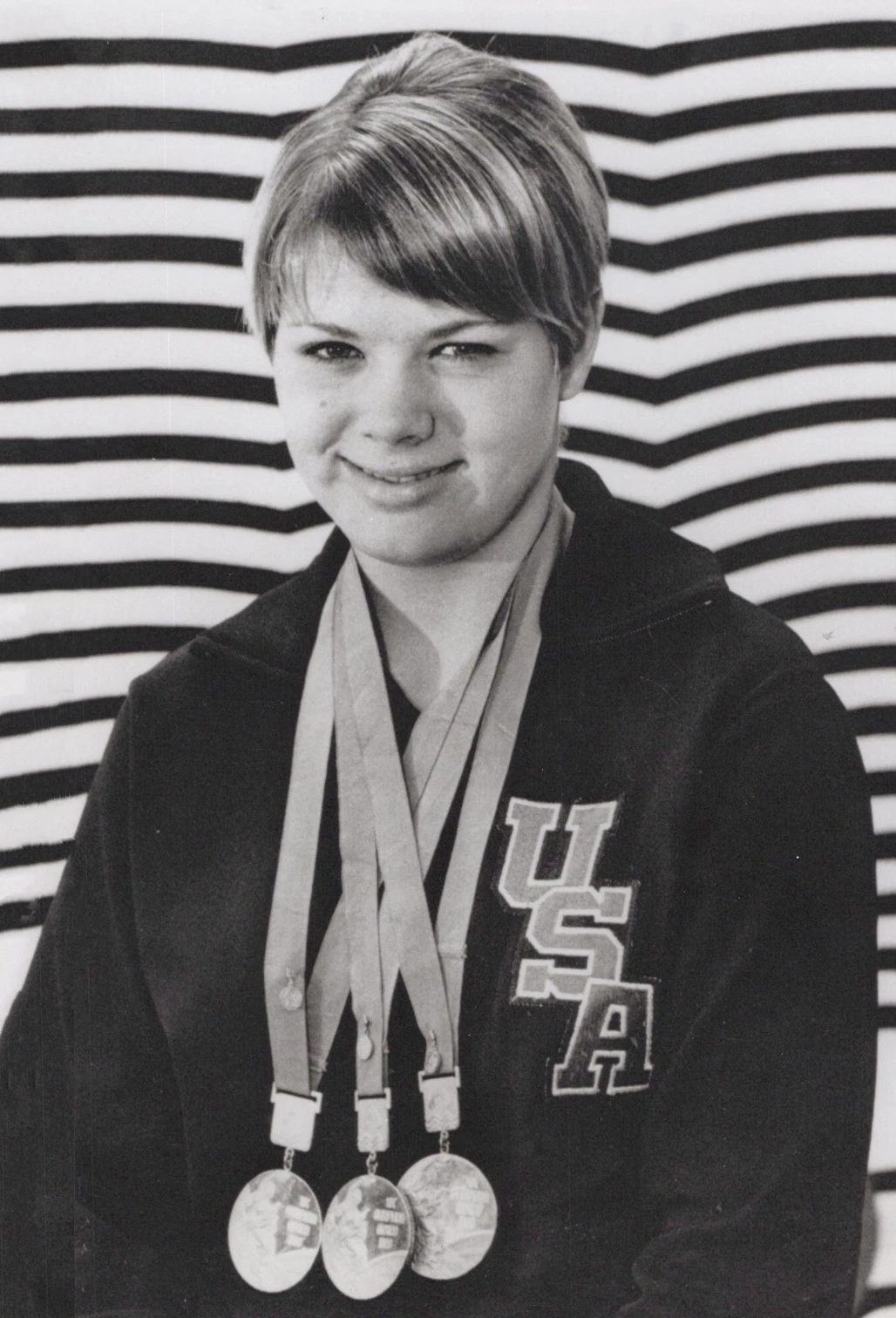
- Meyer in 1968

Personal information
- Full name: Deborah Elizabeth Meyer
- Nickname: "Debbie"
- National team: United States
- Born: August 14, 1952 (age 73) Naval Academy Hospital, Annapolis, Maryland, U.S.
- Height: 5 ft 9 in (175 cm)
- Weight: 125 lb (57 kg)

Sport
- Sport: Swimming
- Strokes: Freestyle
- Club: Arden Hills Swim Club
- Coach: Sherm Chavoor (Arden Hills)
Medal record
Women's swimming
Representing the United States
Olympic Games
Gold medal – first place	1968 Mexico City	200 m freestyle
Gold medal – first place	1968 Mexico City	400 m freestyle
Gold medal – first place	1968 Mexico City	800 m freestyle
Pan American Games
Gold medal – first place	1967 Winnipeg	400 m freestyle
Gold medal – first place	1967 Winnipeg	800 m freestyle

Deborah Elizabeth Meyer (born August 14, 1952), also known by her married name Deborah Meyer Weber, is an American former competition swimmer, a 1968 three-time Olympic champion, and a former world record-holder in five freestyle events: 200, 400, 800, and 1500 meters, and 880yd freestyle.

== Early life ==
Meyer was born in 1952 in Annapolis, Maryland, and lived in Haddonfield, New Jersey during childhood. She moved with her family to warm and sunny Sacramento, California when her father was transferred with Campbell Soup. She attended Sacramento's Rio Americano High School, and was trained during her high school years and beyond by Hall of Fame Coach Sherm Chavoor at the Arden Hills Swim Club in Carmichael, as were fellow 1968 U.S. team swimming Olympians Mark Spitz, Michael J. Burton, John Ferris, Sue Peterson, and John Nelson. Chavoor was one of the early coaches to challenge young elite women swimmers with "overdistance training", which focused on workouts that gave more total yardage and often featured mid-range and distance intervals to build greater endurance and speed.

Chavoor would also serve as Head Coach of the U.S. Women's Olympic swim team in 1968, where he would again coach Meyer, who may have had greater confidence and focus having Chavoor manage her at the Olympics.

== 1968 Mexico City Olympics ==
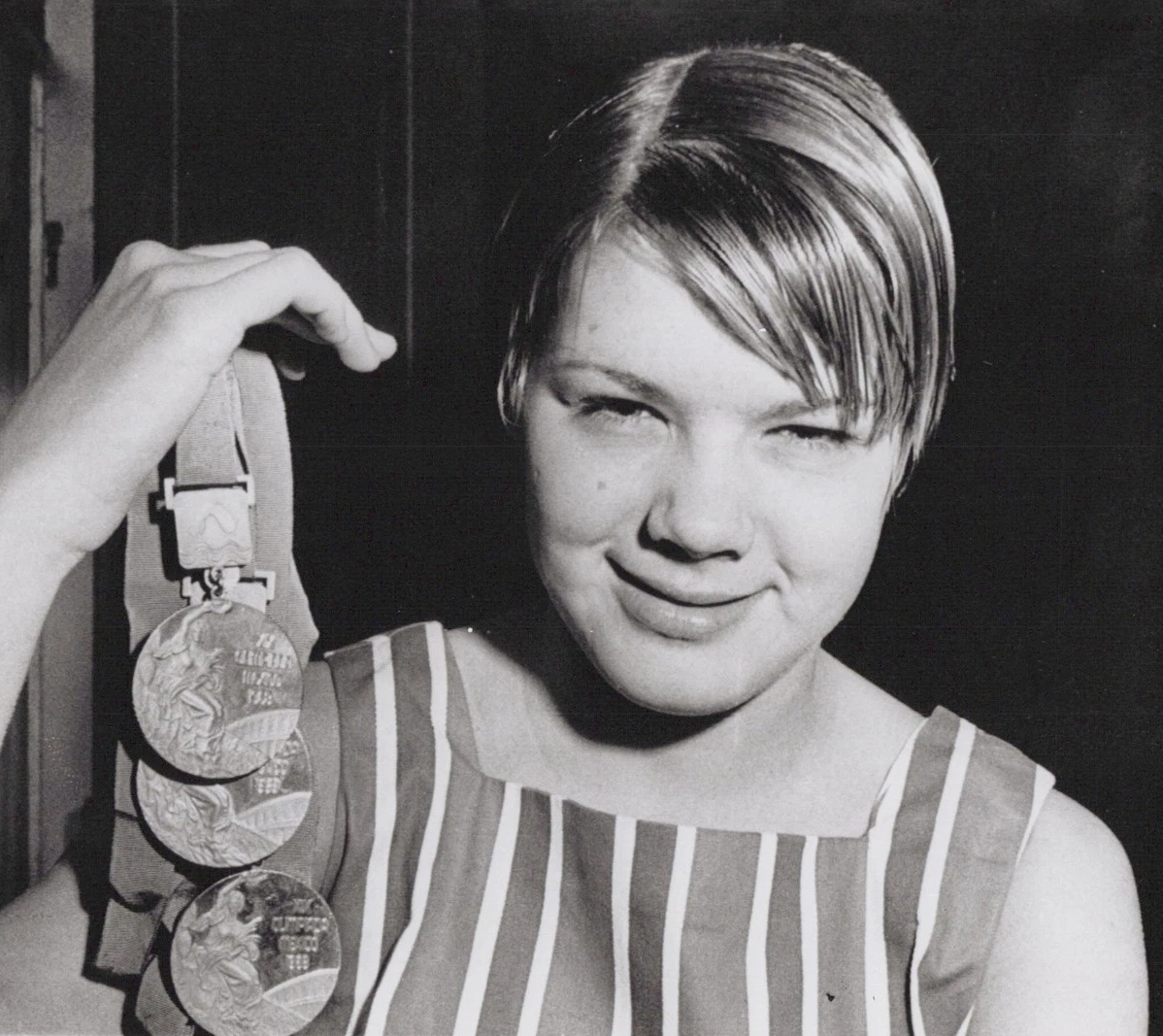
Meyer in 1968

In 1968, the women's freestyle races at 200-meter and 800-meter distances were added to the Summer Olympics for the first time, giving Meyer, a freestyle specialist, two new events where she could dominate the competition. Prior to 1968, the longest race for women was the 400-meter freestyle. In contrast, the male competitors had raced the 1,500-meter freestyle (the metric mile) for decades, dating back to 1896.

Demonstrating unusual dominance in freestyle distance, Meyer set world records in the 200-meter and 800-meter freestyle swimming events at the 1968 U.S. Olympics trials. As the first woman swimmer to participate in the 800-meter Olympic event, Meyer opened the doors for women to compete in events that had been closed to them and demonstrated that with proper training, women could compete at the same distances as the men's teams.

Meyer had obstacles to overcome in the 1968 Olympics, as she had developed a stomach ailment in Mexico City and had just recovered from a painful bout of bursitis in her left shoulder. Competing as a favorite in all three events, Meyer met and exceeded expectations despite her ailments and took gold in the 200-, 400-, and 800-meter freestyle races at age 15, becoming the first swimmer to win three individual gold medals in one Olympics. Katie Ledecky is the only other female swimmer to have won all three events, in the 2016 Summer Olympics in Rio. Despite competing at the high altitude of Mexico City, her winning times at the Olympic Games were 2:10.5 for the 200-meter, 4:31.8 for the 400-meter, and 9:24.0 for the 800-meter distances, all of them new or first-time Olympic records.

With strong contributions by Meyer, Coach Sherm Chavoor's 1968 U.S. women's Olympic team won ten of a possible fifteen gold medals, eight silver of a possible twelve, and eight bronze of a possible twelve. In total, the U.S. women captured twenty-six medals out of a possible thirty-nine.

While overcoming her problems with asthma, Meyer broke 15 world records in swimming during her career. She broke 24 American records and won 19 Amateur Athletic Union (AAU) national championships. Reluctant to continue training for the 1972 Olympics, Meyer retired from competitive swimming in 1970. She would attend UCLA, but not as a swimmer.

=== Coaching and personal ===
Meyer is married to Bill Weber, and has a daughter, son, and step-daughter. She owns the Debbie Meyer Swim School in Carmichael, California. According to the business website, Meyer has taught swimming in the area around Sacramento since the 1970s, and she opened her own school in 1993. Along with teaching both children and adults to be safe in the water, Meyer is coaching the Truckee Tahoe Swim Team in Truckee, California. As a tribute to her athletic successes, she uses the custom California automobile license plate "3GOLD68".

=== Honors ===
Befitting her many records and achievements in both national and international competition, particularly in the late 1960's, Meyer was the recipient of many honors. In 1968, she won the James E. Sullivan Award, given to the greatest athlete of the year. In 1969, she was named Associated Press Athlete of the Year. As an ongoing honor, she was recognized as Swimming World's World Swimmer of the Year in 1967, 1968 and 1969. Among her more selective honors, Meyer was inducted into the International Swimming Hall of Fame in 1977, and the United States Olympic Hall of Fame in 1986. These honors may have been bestowed partly as a result of her being the first woman to win three Olympic gold medals, and her continued dedication to the sport of swimming through her years as a coach.

On July 5, 2004, Meyer was inducted into the American National High School Hall of Fame.

== See also ==
- List of Olympic medalists in swimming (women)
- List of University of California, Los Angeles people
- World record progression 200 metres freestyle
- World record progression 400 metres freestyle
- World record progression 800 metres freestyle
- World record progression 1500 metres freestyle

Records
Preceded by Sharon Finneran	Women's 800-meter freestyle world record-holder (long course); July 9, 1967 – March 1, 1970	Succeeded by Karen Moras
Preceded by Patty Caretto	Women's 1,500-meter freestyle world record-holder (long course); July 9, 1967 – December 12, 1971	Succeeded by Shane Gould
Preceded by Pam Kruse	Women's 400-meter freestyle world record-holder (long course); July 27, 1967 – April 30, 1971	Succeeded by Karen Moras
Preceded by Linda Gustavson	Women's 200-meter freestyle world record-holder (long course); August 24, 1968 – May 1, 1971	Succeeded by Shane Gould
Awards
Preceded by Claudia Kolb	Swimming World; World Swimmer of the Year; 1967, 1968, 1969	Succeeded by Alice Jones
