= Dus (disambiguation) =

Dus may refer to:

- Dus, a 2005 Indian film
- Dus (1997 film), an incomplete Indian film by Mukul S. Anand
- Dus (surname)
- Đus, Serbian rapper

DUS may refer to:

- Düsseldorf Airport (IATA code: DUS)
- Detroit University School, now University Liggett School
- Durham Union Society
- Denver Union Station
- Distinct, Uniform and Stable - the requirements for new varieties of plants to be eligible for Plant breeders' rights
- DUs, members of the Delta Upsilon fraternity

== See also ==
- Duss (disambiguation)
- Das (disambiguation)
