= Goral (disambiguation) =

A goral is any of four species of Asian ungulates in the genus Naemorhedus

Goral may also refer to:

- Gorals, a people living in southern Poland, northern Slovakia and the Czech Republic
  - Goral ethnolect, spoken by the Gorals

Goral is the last name of:

- Boleslaus Goral (1876–1960), Polish-American priest, professor, and newspaper editor
- Sigrid Goral (born 1952), German Olympic swimmer
