= Mollier =

Mollier is a surname. Notable people with the surname include:

- Dominique Mollier (born 1949), French freestyle swimmer
- Jean-Yves Mollier (born 1947), French Contemporary History teacher
- Louis-Marie Mollier (1846–1911), French-American pioneer priest of north-central Kansas
- Pierre Mollier (born 1961), French historian and freemason
- Richard Mollier (1863–1935), German professor of applied physics and mechanics
