= Mona Plummer Aquatic Center =

Sports venue at ASU, Tempe, Arizona

Coordinates: 33°25′26″N 111°56′02″W

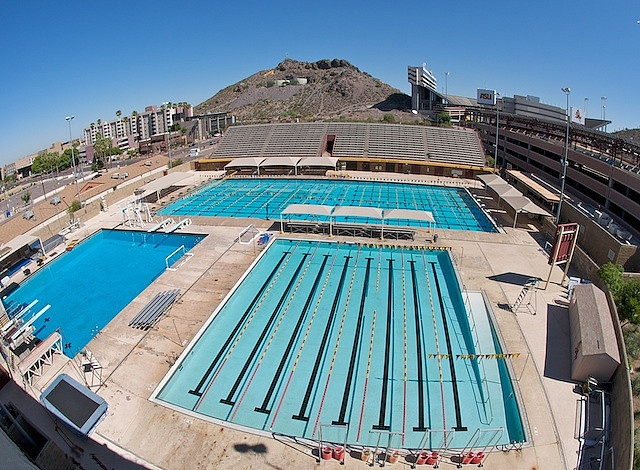
A view of the facility.

The Mona Plummer Aquatic Center is the aquatic center used by the Arizona State University Sun Devils swim team. It opened in 1981, cost four million dollars to build, and is named after Mona Plummer. Plummer was a national championship winning coach who died in 1985; she coached from 1957-1979 at Arizona State.

The complex consists of three pools, including an Olympic-size competition pool, and a diving platform; it has seating for 2,000. It is located on the ASU campus in Tempe, Arizona. The facility hosted the 1989, 1991, 1993, and 1998 Pac-10 Diving Championships, as well as the 1981, 1991, and 1999 NCAA Zone E Diving Championships. The venue is regarded as one of the best collegiate aquatic centers in the nation.

In October 2011, a former ASU swimmer drowned at the facility.

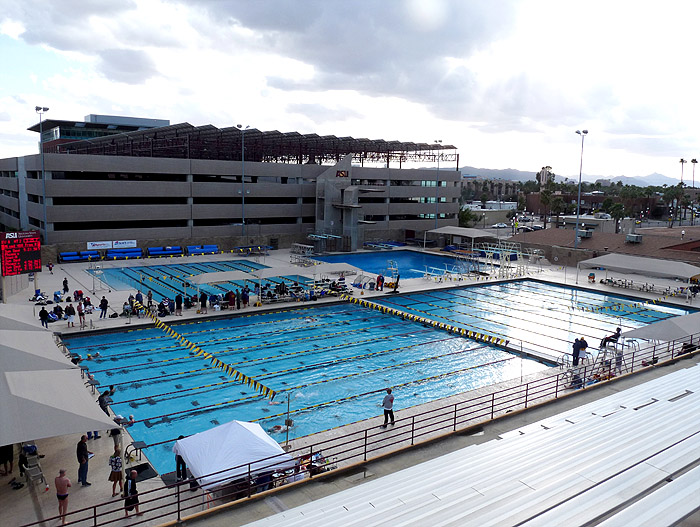
Swim meet at the Mona Plummer Aquatic Center.

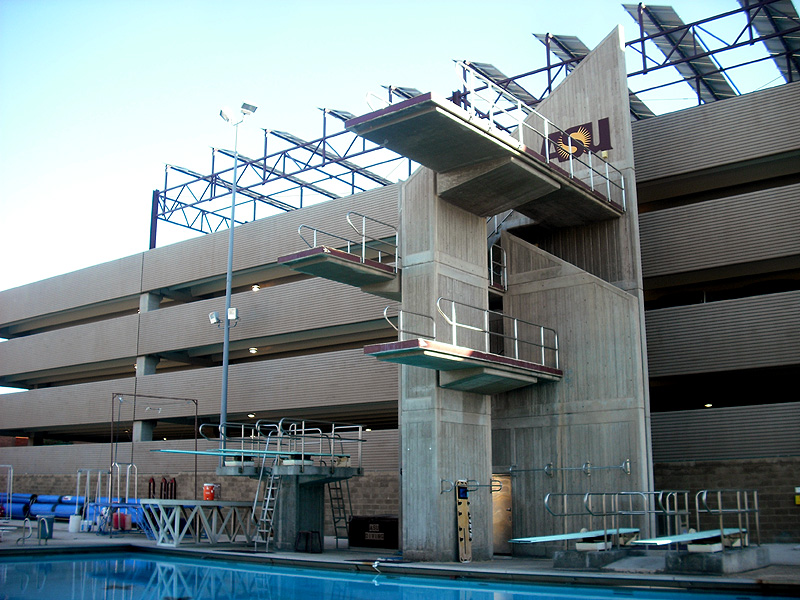
Diving platforms at the Mona Plummer Aquatic Center.
