= Patty Caretto =

American swimmer (born 1951)

- Caretto at 13, July, 1964, at the AAU Championships, breaking the 800, and 1500-meter World records

Personal information
- Full name: Patricia Serena Caretto
- Nickname: "Patty"
- National team: United States
- Born: January 4, 1951 (age 75) Los Angeles, California, U.S.
- Height: 5 ft 3 in (1.60 m)
- Weight: 123 lb (56 kg)

Sport
- Sport: Swimming
- Strokes: Freestyle
- Club: Phillips 66, Long Beach; City of Commerce
- Coach: Don Gambril

Patricia Sarena Caretto (born January 4, 1951), also known by her married name Patricia Brown, is an American former competition swimmer, 1968 Olympic competitor, and 1964 world record-holder in two distance freestyle events. She is a former world record holder in the women's 800-meter and 1,500-meter freestyle, having set world records in those events on eight occasions.

Patty attended Whittier High School, where she competed with her High School team at least for a year after the Olympics and graduated around 1969, nearing the end of her competitive swimming career. Some of her earliest swimming experience came when she swam with the Whittier Swim Association.

== Rosemead, City of Commerce Swim clubs ==
Her most significant swim training occurred as a young age group swimmer with the City of Commerce Swimming Club, in Commerce, California, formerly Rosemead Swim Club under Hall of Fame and future Olympic Coach Don Gambril. Gambrill observed Patty swimming with the Whittier Swim Association, and was able to bring her to his own club. Gambril's Rosemead Swim Club and then City of Commerce Clubs often attended national championships and had a women's team that included 1964 Olympians Sharon Stouder, Sandy Nitta, and Jeanne Halleck Craig.

== 1964 World Records ==
On July 30, 1964, at only 13, Caretto set her first two world records at the AAU National Championships at California's Foothill College in Palo Alto. She completed the 1500-meter in 18.30.5, breaking the standing women's record by 13.5 seconds, and then set a new women's world record for the 800-meter free at the same meet with a 9:07.5. Caretto was just over 5 feet at 13, and around 100 pounds, and bettered many of the men's times in the 1500 event at Nationals.

Her trademark competition stroke technique, known as the windmill, included rapid arm strokes with decreased kicks, around two-beats per two strokes. At the time her world record breaking events, the 800 and 1500-meter events were not part of Olympic competition in the 1964 Olympics, to be held that summer.

Caretto broke the 1,500-meter freestyle record three times, once each in 1964, 1965 and 1966. Swimming for the Commerce Swim Club, she won the AAU outdoors in the 1,500m or 1,650y freestyle in 1964 through 1966, and won the AAU indoor 500-yard freestyle in 1965.

Caretto did not qualify in the September, 1964 Olympic trials in New York. In the 400-meter qualifier she was up against three world record holders. The shorter distance did not suit her distance swimming strengths.

== 1968 Mexico City Olympics ==
=== Olympic trials ===
In the late August 1968 Olympic Trials in Los Angeles, Caretto finished second in the 800-meter freestyle, recording 9:18.5, behind winner Debbie Meyer whose time of 9:10.4 bettered her own pending world record of 9:17.8. Meyer, who also set world records in the 200 and 400-meter swims, dominated the trial's distance events. Though Patty's time was 4.4 seconds faster than Debbie's former standing world record set in 1968, it could not better Debbie Myer's new world record times.

=== 1968 Olympics ===
Later in October, after travelling to the '68 Olympics in Mexico City as a 17-year-old, Caretto placed fifth in the final of the women's 800-meter freestyle. According to a Los Angeles Times account, she had been struggling with illness during that time. Her time of 9:51.3 was 12.7 seconds behind the time of bronze medalist Maria Ramirez of Mexico, who may have benefitted from training at higher altitude during much of her swimming career.

Though the American women's team had trained for altitude at Colorado Springs, the Mexico City altitude affected the times of all the American women swimmers in the event. Myer was 13 seconds slower and Pam Kruse 15 seconds slower than their respective times in the U.S. Trials the previous month. Affected by altitude, fatigue, and recent illness, Caretto was 30 seconds slower than her Trials time.

=== Long Beach State College ===
Around 1969, Patty attended Long Beach State College, where she swam for one year, under the management of her former coach Don Gambril, who began his coaching there in 1967. Patty also swam some with the Phillips 66 Swim Club under Gambril in her later competitive years.

== Post-Olympics ==
Caretto married her Cal State Long Beach classmate, in 1971. She taught physical education to students with motor-skill or learning disabilities in Garden Grove Unified School District in California and married Sam Brown, her second husband. The couple had two children.

Caretto was inducted into the International Swimming Hall of Fame as an "Honor Swimmer" in May, 1987.

She is of Italian origin, the daughter of a wine merchant.

== See also ==
- List of members of the International Swimming Hall of Fame
- World record progression 800 metres freestyle
- World record progression 1500 metres freestyle

Records
Preceded by Carolyn House	Women's 800-meter freestyle world record-holder (long course); July 30, 1964 – September 28, 1964	Succeeded by Sharon Finneran
Preceded by Carolyn House	Women's 1,500-meter freestyle world record-holder (long course); July 30, 1964 – July 9, 1967	Succeeded by Debbie Meyer
