= Gabriele Perthes =

German swimmer (born 1948)

Personal information
- Born: January 20, 1948 (age 78) Dessau, Soviet Occupied Zone

Sport
- Sport: Swimming

Gabriele Perthes (born 20 January 1948) is a German swimmer. She competed in the 1968 Summer Olympics for East Germany.

In 1968, Gabriele Perthes competed in the preliminary heats of the women's 4 × 100 m freestyle relay, along with swimmer Uta Schmuck, Roswitha Krause, and Gabriele Wetzko. The team won a silver medal in final.
