= Sheila Clayton =

British swimmer

Personal information
- Born: 19 July 1951 (age 74) London, England

Sport
- Sport: Swimming

Sheila Clayton (born 19 July 1951) is a British former swimmer. She competed in the women's 400 metre freestyle at the 1968 Summer Olympics.
