= Maryanne Graham =

American swimmer (born 1955)

Personal information
- Full name: Maryanne Graham
- National team: United States
- Born: November 23, 1955 (age 70) Mesa, Arizona
- Height: 5 ft 5 in (1.65 m)
- Weight: 121 lb (55 kg)

Sport
- Sport: Swimming
- Strokes: Backstroke
- Club: Mission Viejo Nadadores
- College team: Arizona State University
- Coach: Mona Plummer (ASU)

Maryanne Graham (born November 23, 1955), also known by her married name Maryanne Keever, is an American former competition swimmer who represented the United States at the 1976 Summer Olympics in Montreal, Quebec.

Graham swam for Arizona State University under Head women's coach Mona Plummer.

== 1976 Olympics ==
Graham competed in the preliminary heats of the women's 200-meter backstroke, finishing with the twelfth best overall performance, but did not advance to the event final. She is currently a coach for Scottsdale Aquatic Club.

== See also ==
- List of Arizona State University alumni
