= Dus (surname) =

Dus or Duś is a Polish surname. It is believed to have originated from either the Polish word dusza which means "soul", or dusic´ which means "to suffocate". Notable people with the surname include:

- Marian Duś (born 1938), Polish bishop
- Zoya Dus (born 1952), Ukrainian swimmer
