= Mona Plummer =

American swim coach (1928–1985)

- Plummer during ASU coaching years

Biographical details
- Born: September 5, 1928; Gadston, Alabama
- Died: March 17, 1985 (aged 56)
- Education: University of Alabama; Spouse Earnest M. Plummer (55)

Coaching career (HC unless noted)
- 1957–1979: Arizona State University
- 1977–1985: Arizona State University; Athletic Director

Head coaching record
- Overall: 181–3 (ASU)

Accomplishments and honors

Championships
- 6 x 1969–78 AIAW National Champions (ASU)

Awards
- Arizona State's Hall of Distinction, 1984; HOF, National College Directors of Athletics, 1988

Ramona Miller Farish (1928–1985), known by her married name Mona Miller Farish Plummer after 1955, was an American swim coach for Arizona State University from 1957–1979, where she led the team to eight national championships. At Arizona, Plummer mentored over forty All-Americans and nine Olympians including 1972 Munich Olympic triple gold medalist Melissa Belote Ripley and 1968 Mexico City Olympian Jan Henne Hawkins, who won two golds, a silver and a bronze. Plummer served as Arizona State's Associate Athletic Director from 1977–1985.

== Early life and education ==
Ramona M. Farish was born September 5, 1928, to Annie Mae Reynolds Farish and Edward Preston Farish in Gadsden, Alabama, and later lived in Birmingham. She graduated George Washington High School, and Averett College, a women's junior college in Danville, Virginia. She graduated Birmingham's University of Alabama with a Bachelor's and Master's degree in Physical Education, where she was a member of Phi Mu Sorority.

== Arizona State University ==
Plummer taught physical education at the University of Arizona, Tucson in 1954-5, and then at Arizona State beginning in 1957. Coaching Arizona State's swim team from 1957–1979, Plummer created one of American's outstanding swim squads, with several world-class athletes and from 1969–1978 won eight AIAW (Association for Intercollegiate Athletics for Women) team titles.

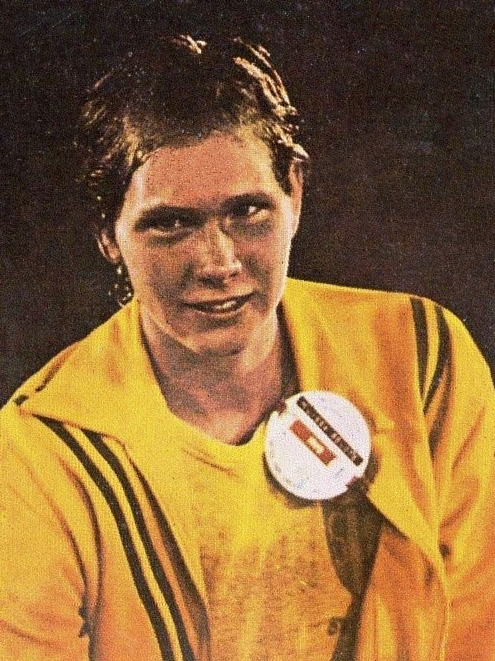
72 Olympic Gold medalist Melissa Belote

While swimming for Plummer, 45 ASU women won individual or shared titles in AIAW events, which included relay events. Plummer coached nine Olympians including 1972 Munich triple Olympic gold medalist Melissa Belote Ripley, and 1968 Mexico City Olympic freestyler Jan Henne Hawkins, who won two golds, a silver and a bronze. Belote would serve as Head Coach of Virginia's Solotar Swim Team. Plummer coached 1972 Olympic backstroker Maryanne Graham who would later coach in Scottsdale. One of her more outstanding swimmers was Kendis Moore Drake. Drake placed fourth in the 100-meter backstroke at the Olympics in 1968, and became the first college swimmer to capture three national event titles with a first place in the 100 back, 50 back, and 100 fly. Plummer coached 1976 Montreal Olympian Cheryl Gibson of Canada who won a silver medal in the 400 IM, 1976 bronze medalist in the 4x100-meter freestyle Gail Amundrud, and 1976 Canadian Olympian Sue Sloan who won a bronze in the 400 medley relay.

She was named Arizona State's assistant athletic director in 1975, and later became ASU's Associate Athletic Director in 1977, a position she held through her death in 1985.

She worked as a member of the United States Olympic Committee from 1977–1980, and coached the U.S. Women's swimming team at both the World University Games in 1973, and the 1979 Pan American Games. In ties to the U.S. Olympic team, she coached Elite Training Camp for the Olympics in 1978 in Colorado Springs. She was part of the AIAW Region 8 Executive Board, and served as a President of the Intermountain Conference.

== Personal life ==
Ramona Farish married Ernest Malcolm Plummer of Selma, Alabama, at Mount Vernon Methodist Church in Monroeville, Alabama, on June 18, 1955.

== Death and legacy ==
Plummer died at her home on March 17, 1985 in Phoenix, Arizona after a long battle with cancer. She was survived by a daughter, Kimberly. A funeral was held at First Methodist Church in Tempe, Arizona on March 21, and her remains were inurned at the Paradise Memorial Gardens Cemetery in Scottsdale. She was 56.

=== Mona Plummer Aquatic Center at ASU ===
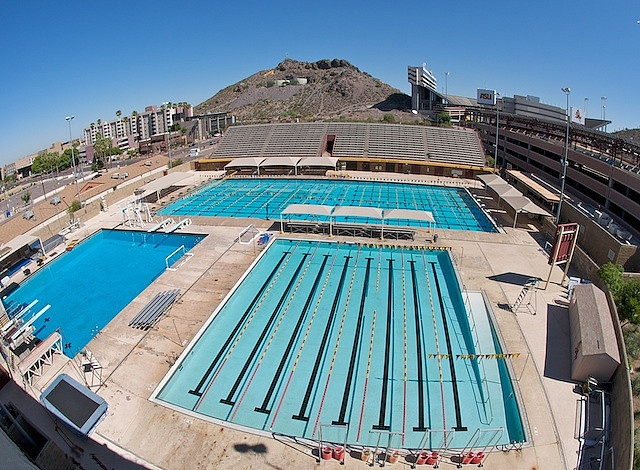
Mona Plummer Aquatic Center

Completed in 1981, the Mona Plummer Aquatic Center at Arizona State, was named in her honor. The complex has three pools, including an Olympic-size competition pool, a nine lane pool and a diving platform. A host for many national meets including those in the PAC-10 and NCAA, it includes seating for 2,000.

== Honors ==
In October 1984, Plummer was made a member of Arizona State's Hall of Distinction, and in June, 1988 was honored as a member of the Hall of Fame of the National Association of the Collegiate Directors of Athletics. In 1979, she was named the national coach of the year. In a more rare distinction, she was named to the College Swimming and Diving Coaches Association of America's (CSCAA) list of the 100 Greatest Coaches.
