= Yumiko Ono =

Japanese swimmer (born 1954)

Personal information
- Born: 3 March 1954 (age 72) Osaka Prefecture, Japan

Sport
- Sport: Swimming
- Strokes: freestyle

Yumiko Ono (born 3 March 1954) is a Japanese former swimmer. She competed in the women's 4 × 100 metre freestyle relay at the 1968 Summer Olympics.
