= Carolyn House =

American swimmer (born 1945)

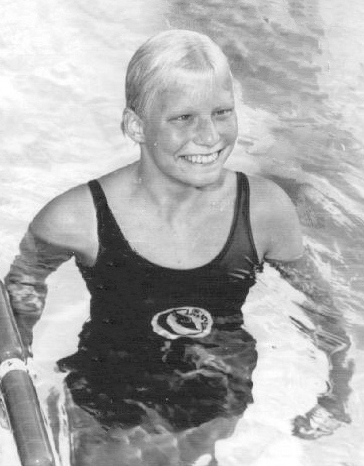
- House in 1962

Personal information
- Full name: Carolyn House
- National team: United States
- Born: August 23, 1945 (age 80) Los Angeles, California, U.S.
- Height: 5 ft 4 in (1.63 m)
- Weight: 110 lb (50 kg)

Sport
- Sport: Swimming
- Strokes: Freestyle
- Club: Los Angeles Athletic Club
- College team: U. Southern Cal. Training, Intramurals only
- Coach: Peter Daland (LAAC), (USC)

Carolyn House (born August 23, 1945) is an American former competition swimmer, who swam for the Los Angeles Athletic Club, a 1960 Olympic participant in the 400-meter freestyle, and a former world record-holder in two events.

House was born in Los Angeles on August 23, 1945 to Dr. Howard House, a well known otolaryngologist who graduated the University of Southern California. Carolyn attended the Hollywood Professional School and later John Marshall High School in Los Angeles, where she began in the fall of 1960, graduating around 1963. In High School, she lived only six blocks from swimming rival and best friend Sharon Finneran. Overcoming a few obstacles in her athletic career, House was born prematurely at six months with very limited vision in her left eye from birth, and wore a contact in her right. Athletic at an early age, beginning at 12, she swam for the highly competitive Los Angeles Athletic Club, where she was managed by Hall of Fame Coach Peter Daland who also coached rival Sharon Finneran. Her older brother John also swam for the Los Angeles Athletic Club and would captain the swim team at the University of Southern California in his Freshman year. As noted below, at 14, she eclipsed the American 1,500-meter record, and placed second to Chris von Saltza in the 400-meter freestyle at the U.S. Olympic trials.

In national competition, House was the AAU outdoor Champion in 1960 in the 1,500 free, won the title again in 1961-62, and captured the 400 free in 1961-62.

== 1960 Rome Olympics ==
In preparation for the Olympics, in addition to her attendance at the Hollywood Professional School, House worked out seven days a week mid-day at the Lynwood pool in greater Los Angeles, and five days a week at the Los Angeles Athletic Club's 25-meter pool in the evening with Coach Peter Daland. Qualifying for the U.S. Women's Olympic team at the early August, 1960 Olympic Trials in Detroit, House placed second in the 400-meter freestyle with a 4:55.1, placing second to Chris Von Salsa who swam a 4:44.5. There was no Olympic event in the 1500-meter freestyle at the time, the event where House would later dominate.

Travelling with the team to Rome at the age of 15, she competed in the preliminary heats of the 400-meter freestyle at the 1960 Summer Olympics, placing tenth overall, and clocking a time of 5:00.7.

== World records ==
In July, 1962, she trained at the Los Angeles Swim Stadium, for an early three hour workout, averaging over three miles per workout, and trained with Peter Daland in the afternoon, including weight training with pulleys in her regiment. During a ten-day span in August 1962, she broke the world records in both the 800-meter and 1,500-meter freestyle events.

As noted, on August 16, 1962, she set a new world record of 9:51.6 in the 800-meter freestyle, and on August 26, 1962, she established a new world mark of 18:44.0 for the 1,500-meter freestyle, cutting 18.8 seconds off the old mark. Both records would survive until July 1964, almost two years later.

=== Late career competition ===
Continuing to compete, at the 1963 AAU Women's Outdoor Senior Swimming Championships in High Point North Carolina on August 14, 1963, though considered a favorite, House placed third in the 1500-meter freestyle. Though a long race, House finished well behind first place Ginnie Duenkel who swam an 18:57.9, and rival Sharon Finneran who swam a 18:59.0. House's time was 19:36.2.

At the National AAU Women's Swimming Championships on July 31, 1964, 13-year old Patty Caretto at just over 5 feet, broke the world record for the 1,500 meter freestyle event, with a time of 18:30.5, breaking House's former record of 18:44 by 14 seconds. Carreto's youth may have accounted partly for her dominance, and Carretto was coached by Don Gambril at the City of Commerce club, noted for overdistance training, which built exceptional endurance in distance swimming competitors. Carretto may have swum longer distances in her training regiment, and begun more intense training at an earlier age. Sharon Fineran placed second with an 18:52.2, and Ginnie Duenkel placed third with an 18:57. Demonstrating she had continued to train, House placed fourth with an 18:59.3.

=== Honors ===
House is a member of the International Swimming Hall of Fame, and was a 1964 recipient of the Old Time Athlete's Association award.

== See also ==
- World record progression 800 metres freestyle
- World record progression 1500 metres freestyle

Records
Preceded by Margareta Rylander	Women's 1,500-meter freestyle world record-holder (long course); August 16, 1962 – July 30, 1964	Succeeded by Patty Caretto
Preceded by Jane Cederqvist	Women's 800-meter freestyle world record-holder (long course); August 26, 1962 – July 30, 1964	Succeeded by Patty Caretto
