= Swimming at the Summer Olympics =

- IOC Code: SWM
- Governing body: World Aquatics
- Events: 41 (men: 20; women: 20; mixed: 1)

Summer Olympics
- 1896; 1900; 1904; 1908; 1912; 1920; 1924; 1928; 1932; 1936; 1948; 1952; 1956; 1960; 1964; 1968; 1972; 1976; 1980; 1984; 1988; 1992; 1996; 2000; 2004; 2008; 2012; 2016; 2020; 2024; 2028; 2032
- Medalists; men; women; Records

Swimming has been contested at every modern Summer Olympics. It has been open to women since 1912. The discipline of swimming is part of the Olympic sport of aquatics alongside artistic swimming, diving, marathon swimming and water polo. At the Olympics, swimming has the second-highest number of medal-contested events after athletics.

== Summary ==
Games	Year	Events	Winner of the medal table	Second in the medal table	Third in the medal table
1	1896	4	Hungary (1)	Greece	Austria
2	1900	7	Great Britain (1)	Germany	France
3	1904	9	Germany (1)	United States	Hungary
4	1908	6	Great Britain (2)	United States	Germany
5	1912	9	Germany (2)	Australasia	United States
6					
7	1920	10	United States (1)	Sweden	Australia
8	1924	11	United States (2)	Great Britain	Australia
9	1928	11	United States (3)	Netherlands	Germany
10	1932	11	Japan (1)	United States	Australia
11	1936	11	Japan (2)	Netherlands	United States
12					
13					
14	1948	11	United States (4)	Denmark	Netherlands
15	1952	11	United States (5)	Hungary	France
16	1956	13	Australia (1)	United States	Japan
17	1960	15	United States (6)	Australia	Great Britain
18	1964	18	United States (7)	Australia	Soviet Union
19	1968	29	United States (8)	Australia	East Germany
20	1972	29	United States (9)	Australia	East Germany
21	1976	26	United States (10)	East Germany	Soviet Union
22	1980	26	East Germany (1)	Soviet Union	Sweden
23	1984	29	United States (11)	Canada	West Germany
24	1988	31	East Germany (2)	United States	Hungary
25	1992	31	United States (12)	Unified Team	Hungary
26	1996	32	United States (13)	Russia	Hungary
27	2000	32	United States (14)	Australia	Netherlands
28	2004	32	United States (15)	Australia	Japan
29	2008	32	United States (16)	Australia	Great Britain
30	2012	32	United States (17)	China	France
31	2016	32	United States (18)	Australia	Hungary
32	2020	35	United States (19)	Australia	Great Britain
33	2024	35	United States (20)	Australia	France
34	2028	41			

== Events ==
=== Men's events ===
Current programme
Event	96	1900	04	08	12	20	24	28	32	36	48	52	56	60	64	68	72	76	80	84	88	92	96	2000	04	08	12	16	20	24	28	Years
50 metres freestyle			X	Not yet reintroduced																	X	X	X	X	X	X	X	X	X	X	X	12
100 metres freestyle	X		X	X	X	X	X	X	X	X	X	X	X	X	X	X	X	X	X	X	X	X	X	X	X	X	X	X	X	X	X	30
200 metres freestyle		X	X	Not yet reintroduced												X	X	X	X	X	X	X	X	X	X	X	X	X	X	X	X	18
400 metres freestyle			X	X	X	X	X	X	X	X	X	X	X	X	X	X	X	X	X	X	X	X	X	X	X	X	X	X	X	X	X	29
800 metre freestyle			X	Not yet reintroduced																									X	X	X	4
1500 metre freestyle			X	X	X	X	X	X	X	X	X	X	X	X	X	X	X	X	X	X	X	X	X	X	X	X	X	X	X	X	X	29
50 metre backstroke	Not yet introduced																														X	1
100 metre backstroke			X	X	X	X	X	X	X	X	X	X	X	X		X	X	X	X	X	X	X	X	X	X	X	X	X	X	X	X	28
200 metre backstroke		X	Not yet reintroduced												X	X	X	X	X	X	X	X	X	X	X	X	X	X	X	X	X	18
50 metre breaststroke	Not yet introduced																														X	1
100 metre breaststroke	Not yet introduced															X	X	X	X	X	X	X	X	X	X	X	X	X	X	X	X	16
200 metre breaststroke				X	X	X	X	X	X	X	X	X	X	X	X	X	X	X	X	X	X	X	X	X	X	X	X	X	X	X	X	28
50 metre butterfly	Not yet introduced																														X	1
100 metre butterfly	Not yet introduced															X	X	X	X	X	X	X	X	X	X	X	X	X	X	X	X	16
200 metre butterfly	Not yet introduced												X	X	X	X	X	X	X	X	X	X	X	X	X	X	X	X	X	X	X	19
200 metre individual medley	Not yet introduced															X	X			X	X	X	X	X	X	X	X	X	X	X	X	14
400 metre individual medley	Not yet introduced														X	X	X	X	X	X	X	X	X	X	X	X	X	X	X	X	X	17
4 × 100 metre freestyle relay	Not yet introduced														X	X	X			X	X	X	X	X	X	X	X	X	X	X	X	15
4 × 200 metre freestyle relay				X	X	X	X	X	X	X	X	X	X	X	X	X	X	X	X	X	X	X	X	X	X	X	X	X	X	X	X	28
4 × 100 metre medley relay	Not yet introduced													X	X	X	X	X	X	X	X	X	X	X	X	X	X	X	X	X	X	18
Events	1	2	7	6	6	6	6	6	6	6	6	6	7	8	10	15	15	13	13	15	16	16	16	16	16	16	16	16	17	17	20	

Past events

- 400 metre breaststroke: 1904, 1912, 1920
- 4 × 50 yard freestyle relay: 1904

Only at the 1896 Summer Olympics

- 500 metre freestyle
- 1200 metre freestyle
- 100 metre freestyle for sailors

Only at the 1900 Summer Olympics

- 1000 metre freestyle
- 4000 metre freestyle
- 200 metre team swimming
- 200 metre obstacle event
- Underwater swimming

=== Women's events ===
Current programme
Event	96	1900	04	08	12	20	24	28	32	36	48	52	56	60	64	68	72	76	80	84	88	92	96	2000	04	08	12	16	20	24	28	Years
50 metre freestyle	Not yet introduced																				X	X	X	X	X	X	X	X	X	X	X	11
100 metre freestyle	Not yet introduced				X	X	X	X	X	X	X	X	X	X	X	X	X	X	X	X	X	X	X	X	X	X	X	X	X	X	X	27
200 metre freestyle	Not yet introduced															X	X	X	X	X	X	X	X	X	X	X	X	X	X	X	X	16
400 metre freestyle	Not yet introduced					X	X	X	X	X	X	X	X	X	X	X	X	X	X	X	X	X	X	X	X	X	X	X	X	X	X	26
800 metre freestyle	Not yet introduced															X	X	X	X	X	X	X	X	X	X	X	X	X	X	X	X	16
1500 metre freestyle	Not yet introduced																												X	X	X	3
50 metre backstroke	Not yet introduced																														X	1
100 metre backstroke	Not yet introduced						X	X	X	X	X	X	X	X	X	X	X	X	X	X	X	X	X	X	X	X	X	X	X	X	X	25
200 metre backstroke	Not yet introduced															X	X	X	X	X	X	X	X	X	X	X	X	X	X	X	X	16
50 metre breaststroke	Not yet introduced																														X	1
100 metre breaststroke	Not yet introduced															X	X	X	X	X	X	X	X	X	X	X	X	X	X	X	X	16
200 metre breaststroke	Not yet introduced						X	X	X	X	X	X	X	X	X	X	X	X	X	X	X	X	X	X	X	X	X	X	X	X	X	25
50 metre butterfly	Not yet introduced																														X	1
100 metre butterfly	Not yet introduced												X	X	X	X	X	X	X	X	X	X	X	X	X	X	X	X	X	X	X	19
200 metre butterfly	Not yet introduced															X	X	X	X	X	X	X	X	X	X	X	X	X	X	X	X	16
200 metre individual medley	Not yet introduced															X	X			X	X	X	X	X	X	X	X	X	X	X	X	14
400 metre individual medley	Not yet introduced														X	X	X	X	X	X	X	X	X	X	X	X	X	X	X	X	X	17
4 × 100 metre freestyle relay	Not yet introduced				X	X	X	X	X	X	X	X	X	X	X	X	X	X	X	X	X	X	X	X	X	X	X	X	X	X	X	27
4 × 200 metre freestyle relay	Not yet introduced																						X	X	X	X	X	X	X	X	X	9
4 × 100 metre medley relay	Not yet introduced													X	X	X	X	X	X	X	X	X	X	X	X	X	X	X	X	X	X	18
Events					2	3	5	5	5	5	5	5	6	7	8	14	14	13	13	14	15	15	16	16	16	16	16	16	17	17	20	

=== Mixed events ===
Current programme
Event	96	1900	04	08	12	20	24	28	32	36	48	52	56	60	64	68	72	76	80	84	88	92	96	2000	04	08	12	16	20	24	28	Years
4 × 100 metre medley relay	Not yet introduced																												X	X	X	3
Events																													1	1	1	

== Medal table ==
Updated after the 2024 Summer Olympics

Rank	Nation	Gold	Silver	Bronze	Total
1	United States	265	194	152	611
2	Australia	74	75	75	224
3	East Germany	38	32	22	92
4	Hungary	30	27	20	77
5	Japan	24	28	32	84
6	Great Britain	23	33	30	86
7	Netherlands	19	20	21	60
8	China	18	24	19	61
9	Germany	14	18	31	63
10	Soviet Union	12	21	26	59
11	Canada	12	20	30	62
12	France	12	17	21	50
13	Sweden	11	16	14	41
14	South Africa	8	8	6	22
15	Italy	7	7	17	31
16	Unified Team	6	3	1	10
17	Russia	4	9	9	22
18	Ukraine	4	3	2	9
19	Romania	4	2	5	11
20	Ireland	4	0	3	7
21	West Germany	3	5	14	22
22	Denmark	3	5	7	15
23	Zimbabwe	2	4	1	7
24	Australasia	2	3	3	8
25	Spain	2	2	4	8
26	ROC (ROC)	2	2	1	5
27	New Zealand	2	1	3	6
28	Tunisia	2	0	1	3
29	Austria	1	6	4	11
30	United Team of Germany	1	5	6	12
31	Brazil	1	4	10	15
32	Greece	1	4	2	7
33	Poland	1	3	2	6
34	South Korea	1	3	1	5
35	Belgium	1	2	2	5
36	Costa Rica	1	1	2	4
37	Argentina	1	1	1	3
37	Bulgaria	1	1	1	3
39	Yugoslavia	1	1	0	2
40	Mexico	1	0	1	2
40	Suriname	1	0	1	2
42	Kazakhstan	1	0	0	1
42	Lithuania	1	0	0	1
42	Singapore	1	0	0	1
45	Hong Kong	0	2	2	4
46	Belarus	0	2	1	3
47	Slovakia	0	2	0	2
48	Finland	0	1	4	5
49	Cuba	0	1	1	2
49	Norway	0	1	1	2
51	Croatia	0	1	0	1
51	Serbia	0	1	0	1
51	Slovenia	0	1	0	1
54	Switzerland	0	0	4	4
55	Philippines	0	0	2	2
56	Trinidad and Tobago	0	0	1	1
56	Venezuela	0	0	1	1
Totals (57 entries)		623	622	620	1,865

== Nations ==
Nation	96	00	04	08	12	20	24	28	32	36	48	52	56	60	64	68	72	76	80	84	88	92	96	00	04	08	12	16	20	24	Years
Afghanistan																													1	1	2
Albania																						1			2	2	2	2	2	2	7
Algeria																			5			1	1	3	6	5	1	1	2	2	10
American Samoa																										2	2		2	1	4
Andorra																							1	2	2	1	2	2			6
Angola																			5		8	3	1	2	1	2	2	2	2	2	11
Antigua and Barbuda																									2	1	2	2	2	2	6
Argentina							4	4	5	1	17	7		3	7	8	4	5		6	2	3	7	13	10	9	4	5	4	3	22
Armenia																							1	2	1	1	2	2	2	2	8
Aruba																									2	1	2	2	2	2	6
Australasia				5	9																										2
Australia		1				6	5	5	5	5	10	10	26	26	32	24	24	28	17	31	25	33	33	44	41	42	45	37	35	41	26
Austria	2	3	1	1	8			3		8	2	3		10	7	3	2	1	5	6	6	2	4	8	6	12	11	6	7	4	26
Azerbaijan																							1	2	4	2	2	2	2	2	8
Bahamas																		2		2	1	2	1	4	4	4	1	3	2	2	12
Bahrain																				2				2	2	2	2	1	2	2	8
Bangladesh																					2	1	1	2	2	2	1	2	2	2	10
Barbados																1				1	1		2	3	4	4	1	2	2	1	11
Belarus																							10	9	9	8	8	8	6		7
Belgium		1		7	5	12	6	5			6	10	6	3	2	6	4	10	7	4	7	7	4	9		6	12	10	2	4	25
Benin																									2	2	1	2	2	2	6
Bermuda										5	5		2							1	1	6		1	1	2	1	2		2	12
Bhutan																													1	1	2
Bolivia										1											1	2	2	2	2	2	2	2	2	2	11
Bosnia and Herzegovina																						2	2	2	1	1	2	2	2	2	9
Botswana																										2		2	1	2	4
Brazil						2			8	16	13	12	4	5	4	4	12	9	9	7	15	9	10	13	23	22	18	33	26	18	23
British Virgin Islands																												1	1		2
Brunei																											1		1	2	3
Bulgaria																3	3	5	13		8	5	1	6	6	4	3	2	5	4	14
Burkina Faso																									1	2	2	2	2	2	6
Burundi																									2	1	2	2	2	2	6
Cambodia																	4						2	2	2	2	2	2	2	2	9
Cameroon																									1	2	2		2	2	5
Canada				1	1	3	2	6	14	14	9	9	8	8	12	15	38	38		37	31	29	27	39	20	27	31	28	24	28	26
Cape Verde																													2	2	2
Cayman Islands																									3	2	2	2	2	2	6
Central African Republic																											1	2	1	2	4
Chile								4		4		1											1	2	3	2	1	2	2	2	11
China										2	1	1								14	24	16	21	21	28	40	50	43	19	31	14
Chinese Taipei														1		4	3			5	8		8	13	13	5	3	2	3	2	13
Colombia											2		3		1	9	4	5	2	1	1	1	5	5	3	5	3	4	2	2	18
Comoros																										1	1	2		2	4
Republic of the Congo																						1	2	2	2	1	2	2	1	2	9
Cook Islands																										1	2	2	1	2	5
Costa Rica																1		1	2	1	8	1	3	2	1	2	2	1	2	2	14
Croatia																							11	17	13	13	3	2	2	3	8
Cuba											2	2	2	1		3						2	3	7	2	2	2	2	2	2	14
Cyprus																			4			2	2	7	5	2	1	2	2	2	10
Czechoslovakia						4	9	1		3	3	4	2	3	3	1	3	1	5		6	8									17
Czech Republic																							10	6	12	8	5	7	8	4	8
Democratic Republic of the Congo																										1				2	2
Denmark		1		5	1		4	5	2	18	6	9	2	4	3	3	6	2	1	3	15	8	10	7	6	9	10	15	11	7	27
Djibouti																											1	1	2	2	4
Dominica																							1	2						2	3
Dominican Republic																								1		1	2	2	2	2	6
East Germany																24	37	23	30		26										5
Timor-Leste																													2	2	2
Ecuador																3	1	1	2			1	5	3	1	2	2	2	2	2	13
Egypt										1	6	3					2			8	5	2	2	6	2	2	2	5	4	3	15
El Salvador																14	7			2		1	2	1	1	1	2	2	2	2	12
Equatorial Guinea																								2					1	1	3
Eritrea																													1	2	2
Estonia										2												4	1	4	6	9	2	2	3	2	8
Ethiopia																											2	2	1	1	4
Fiji																				3	5	3	2	2	1	1	2	2	2	2	11
Finland				3	6	1	2	1	1	2	1	13	1	5	6	3	1	1	1	2	1	12	12	7	7	5	7	8	5	2	27
France		47		4	3	13	20	13	5	8	17	16	16	19	9	16	18	16	13	16	25	25	25	19	21	33	29	28	25	29	28
Gabon																												1	2	2	3
The Gambia																												1	1	2	3
Georgia																								1	1	2	1	2	2	2	7
Germany		6	4	5	17			19	2	24		9	18	26	38							24	28	35	35	23	27	27	28	24	20
Ghana																												2	2	2	3
Great Britain		7		25	18	18	26	21	15	22	32	26	22	32	33	27	36	40	32	33	31	28	39	32	37	37	43	26	30	31	28
Greece	15				1		1			5	2			2			5	2	2	3	4	2	8	14	28	17	12	13	11	16	20
Grenada																								1	2		1	2	2	2	6
Guam																					4	7	2	1	1	1	2	2	2		9
Guatemala												1				3				6	1	5	2	1	4	1	1	2	2	2	13
Guinea																								2	1	2	1	2	2	2	7
Guinea-Bissau																														1	1
Guyana																									1	1	2	2	2	2	6
Haiti																							1					2	2	2	4
Honduras																				6	3	4	1	2	2	2	2	2	2	2	11
Hong Kong												4	2	1	3	3	2	4		8	10	8	3	9	7	4	3	7	8	7	18
Hungary	1	1	2	10	8		6	8	5	13	15	15	16	18	19	14	16	8	13		13	13	21	18	25	27	31	33	32	21	28
Iceland											8			2	2	4	4	3		4	6	2	3	9	7	8	7	3	2	2	17
Independent Olympic Participants																						4									1
India									1		7	5	2								1		2	2	1	4	1	2	3	2	12
Independent Olympic Athletes																												2			1
Individual Neutral Athletes																														4	1
Indonesia												1	3	2				1		1	2		1	6	3	2	1	2	2	2	13
Iran															1								1	1	1	1	1	1	1	1	9
Iraq																								2	1		1	1		1	5
Ireland								2								4	7	4	3	2	5	2	5	4	2	3	4	3	9	12	16
Israel												1	1	4	2	6	1	2		3	1	4	4	10	2	7	5	7	12	27	18
Italy		2		4	2	4	6	5	2			10	7	23	16	10	24	13	13	26	21	24	14	21	29	32	33	35	36	38	26
Ivory Coast																									2	1	2	2	1		5
Jamaica																1	1			4			1		4	3	1	2	2	2	10
Japan						2	6	10	23	21		22	19	21	38	20	15	15		22	23	25	27	21	20	31	27	34	33	27	23
Jordan																							2	2	2	2	2	2	2	2	8
Kazakhstan																							7	8	11	12	3	2	2	2	8
Kenya													1											2	2	2	2	2	2	2	8
Kosovo																												2	2	2	3
Kuwait																	2		3	5	2	3	3	2		1	2		2	2	11
Kyrgyzstan																							12	18	6	3	2	2	1	2	8
Laos																								1	2	2	1	2	2	2	7
Latvia																						1	4	4	5	2	2	2	2	2	9
Lebanon																1	2		2	4	4	1		2	5	2	2	2	2	2	13
Lesotho																											1				1
Libya																			4						2	2	1	2	1	2	7
Liechtenstein																											1	2	2		2
Lithuania																						2	8	6	10	9	4	6	6	7	9
Luxembourg						2	4	3		4		1	1	4	1	1					2	1		3	2	4	1	3	2	1	17
North Macedonia																							4	4	4	2	2	2	2	2	8
Madagascar																			3			1	2	2	2	2	2	2	2	2	10
Malawi																									2	2	1	2	2	2	6
Malaysia													2	2	7		2	1		1	2	1	5	9	4	5	1	2	2	2	16
Maldives																						2	1	2	2	2	2	2	2	2	9
Mali																								2	2	2	2	2	1	2	7
Malta																							1	2	2	2	2	2	2	2	8
Marshall Islands																										2	2	2	2	2	5
Mauritania																														1	1
Mauritius																						6	2	2	2	2	2	2	2	2	9
Mexico									3		9	8	4	11	10	27	22	9	7	12	10	7	2	7	6	4	8	3	3	4	21
Federated States of Micronesia																								2	2	2	2	2	2	2	7
Moldova																							5		10	3	2	2	2	2	7
Monaco																		1		1		1	1	1	1		1		2	1	9
Mongolia																								2	1	2	2	2	2	2	7
Montenegro																										1		2	2	2	4
Morocco																								1	1	1	1	2	2	2	7
Mozambique																			5	2	2	3	1	2	2	2	2	2	2	2	12
Myanmar														1	1									1		1		1		1	6
Namibia																						2	1	1							3
Nepal																							2	2	2	2	2	2	2	2	8
Netherlands		4		7		4	12	14	5	14	12	13		19	26	17	19	15	12	16	11	9	20	24	16	16	15	16	15	19	24
Netherlands Antilles																				3	1		1	2		1					5
New Zealand						1	1	4			1	2	5		2	4	6	9		8	7	11	14	8	13	15	17	8	7	9	21
Nicaragua																		2	1				1	2	2	2	2	2	2	2	10
Niger																								2	1	2	1	2	2	2	7
Nigeria																						2		2	2	2		2	1	2	7
Norway					5	2	1	1	1		1	3				1	4	7		3	2	6	5		1	4	3	2	4	3	20
Oman																							1	1		4			1	1	5
Pakistan											4	2	3										1	1	2	2	2	2	2	2	11
Palau																								2	1	1	1	2	2	2	7
Palestine																								1	1	2	2	2	2	2	7
Panama								1										3		1	1	1	2	2	2	2	1	2	2	2	13
Papua New Guinea																								2	1	2	2	1	2	2	7
Paraguay																		3				2	2	2	1	2	2	2	2	2	9
Peru										3				6		3	3		4	5	2	2	2	3	2	2	3	2	2	2	16
Philippines								2	3	5	3	1	8	8	2	7	7	3		4	4	5	2	4	5	5	2	2	2	2	22
Poland								2		4		7	1	5		4	5	3	8		5	14	11	8	7	15	18	19	17	20	19
Portugal							1				1	4		5	3			5	2	2	12	9	12	7	11	8	7	4	7	4	18
Puerto Rico														1	4	9		12		5	3	6	7	3	6	4	2	2	2	2	15
Qatar																								1	1	1	2	2	2	1	7
Rhodesia														4																	1
Romania												1	2	2		2	3		5	2	5	10	14	11	7	6	4	6	4	3	17
Russia					4																		30	28	30	32	32	34	35		8
Rwanda																								2	2	2	2	2	2	2	7
Saar												1																			1
Saint Kitts and Nevis																														1	1
Saint Lucia																								2	1	1	1	1	2	1	7
Saint Vincent and the Grenadines																								2	1		1	2	2	2	6
Samoa																												2		2	1
San Marino																				2	2		1	1	2	2	1		1	1	10
Saudi Arabia																						2		1	1	1			1	2	6
Senegal																					2	2		2	2	2	2	2	2	2	9
Serbia and Montenegro																							4		7						2
Serbia																										9	8	6	7	5	5
Seychelles																						4	1	2	2	2	2	2	2	2	7
Sierra Leone																							1					2	2	2	4
Singapore												1					3			4	5	5	5	8	5	5	5	3	3	5	13
Slovakia																							3	4	2	3	5	3	2	2	8
Slovenia																						5	5	6	11	9	12	9	3	5	9
Solomon Islands																													1	1	2
South Africa					1	1		5	1		3	6	8	3								10	7	14	8	22	18	11	15	8	17
South Korea															4	1	1			3	15	4	20	17	19	16	15	8	12	15	14
Soviet Union												18	10	23	21	31	26	31	39		27	29									9
Spain						2	4	5			6	3		10	11	13	9	14	11	8	11	21	18	23	16	21	13	23	9	18	22
Sri Lanka												1		1						1	2	1		2	2	2	2	2	2	2	12
Sudan																								1		1	2	2	2	2	6
Suriname																				2	1	3	4	2	2	2	2	2	1	2	11
Swaziland																				1	2		1	2	1	1	1		2	2	9
Sweden		1		12	24	13	14	9	2	5	8	12	5	15	14	16	15	18	24	24	18	17	18	16	15	17	12	11	10	12	28
Switzerland						4	2	1		4	8	8		9	2	4	10	2	3	13	10	4	5	9	13	6	6	8	13	8	23
Syria																						1	1	2	1	2	2	2	1	1	9
Tajikistan																								2		2	1	2	2	2	6
Tanzania																										2	2	2		2	4
Thailand															2			2				5	6	8	6	2	2	2	2	2	11
Togo																											1	2	1	1	4
Tonga																											1	2	2	2	4
Trinidad and Tobago																1	1			1	1		2	3	3	3	1	2	2	2	12
Tunisia																		2		1	1			1	2	2	4	2	1	2	10
Turkey														2			2			4	2	3	4	7	9	11	6	4	11	8	13
Turkmenistan																									2	2	2	2	2	2	6
Uganda																				1				2	1	2	2	2	2	2	8
Ukraine																							13	25	27	21	12	7	7	5	8
United Arab Emirates																					6	5	1	1	1	1	1	2	1	2	10
United States	1	2	25	8	7	22	26	23	27	28	28	30	28	31	48	52	51	51		43	44	40	44	48	43	41	47	44	50	46	29
Uruguay											2	1				5	4	1		2	1	1	2	4	4	3	2	2	2	2	16
Uzbekistan																							6	10	15	7	2	2	2		7
Vanuatu																														2	1
Venezuela												1		1	2		4	12	3	6			7	5	4	12	8	4	3	3	14
Vietnam												1		2	3	2			11		2	2	2	2	1	1	1	2	2	2	15
Virgin Islands																		2		7	6	3	1	1	2	1	1	2	2	2	12
West Germany																27	44	22		24	29										5
Yemen																									1	2		1	2	1	5
Yugoslavia							6			4	6	3	1	9	2	6	5	4	3	3	3			9							22
Zambia															2									2	2	2	2	2	2	2	6
Zimbabwe															2				2		4	4	1	3	2	2	1	2	2	2	10
Nations	4	12	4	14	17	19	23	28	20	29	34	48	33	45	42	51	52	51	41	67	77	92	117	150	152	162	167	172	181	189	
Swimmers	19	76	32	100	120	116	118	182	128	248	249	319	235	380	405	468	532	471	333	494	633	641	762	954	937	986	900	906	1000	854	
Year	96	00	04	08	12	20	24	28	32	36	48	52	56	60	64	68	72	76	80	84	88	92	96	00	04	08	12	16	20	24	

== Notable changes to the sport ==
Times have consistently dropped over the years due to better training techniques and new developments within the sport.

In the first four Olympics, competitions were not held in pools, but rather in open water (1896, the Mediterranean Sea; 1900, the Seine; 1904, an artificial lake; 1906, the Mediterranean). The 1904 Olympics' races were the only ones ever measured in yards, instead of the usual metres. A 100-metre pool was built for the 1908 Olympics and was located in the centre of the main stadium's track and field oval. The 1912 Olympics, held in the Stockholm harbor, marked the beginning of electrical timing.

Male swimmers wore full body swimsuits up until the 1940s, which caused more drag in the water than their modern swim-wear counterparts. Also, over the years, pool designs have lessened the drag. Some design considerations allow for the reduction of swimming resistance making the pool faster, namely, proper pool depth, elimination of waves, elimination of currents, increased lane width, energy absorbing racing lane lines and gutters, and the use of other innovative hydraulic, acoustic, illumination, and swimwear designs.

The 1924 Olympics were the first to use the standard 50-metre pool with marked lanes (a standard that remains to this day). In the freestyle, swimmers originally dove from the pool walls, but diving blocks were first incorporated at the 1936 Summer Olympics. The flip-turn was developed by the 1950s. Swimming goggles were first allowed in 1976.

The butterfly stroke events were not held until 1956. Previous rules permitted the butterfly stroke in breaststroke races. After 1956, when these rules were changed, butterfly became its own stroke entirely.

The 800 m event was added to the women's programme in 1968; whilst longer, this event was not as far as the men's 1500 m event. This discrepancy was evened out in 2020: that year, the 1500 metres was included in the women's programme for the first time and the 800 metres freestyle was added to the men's programme.

Both men and women were granted the 200 metres freestyle race in 1968, giving swimmers an intermediate distance race between 100 metres and 400 metres.

The women's 4 × 200 metres freestyle relay race was added in 1996—a men's relay race at that distance had been held since 1912; interestingly, the winning time for the women's 4 × 200 metres freestyle relay in 1996 was more than two minutes faster than the men's 4 × 200 metres freestyle relay of 1912. At six Games, the men had two freestyle relay races, while the women had one. Starting with 1996, both genders have two.

The medley relay races (4 × 100 metres) were not held for men or for women until 1960, but they have continued in every Games since then.

The mixed 4 × 100 metres medley relay (2 women and 2 men) was added to the programme in the 2020 Olympic Games.

the men’s and women’s 50 m backstroke, breaststroke, and butterfly were added to the programme in the 2028 Olympic Games.

== See also ==
- List of Olympic medalists in swimming (men)
- List of Olympic medalists in swimming (women)
- List of Olympic venues in swimming
- Major achievements in swimming by nation
- Swimming at the Summer Paralympics
