= Kendis Moore =

American swimmer (born 1948)

Personal information
- Full name: Kendis Marion Moore
- National team: United States
- Born: November 23, 1948 (age 77) Culver City, California, U.S.
- Height: 5 ft 6 in (1.68 m)
- Weight: 130 lb (59 kg)

Sport
- Sport: Swimming
- Strokes: Backstroke, butterfly
- Club: Arizona Desert Rats
- College team: Arizona State University
- Coach: Mona Plummer (ASU)
Medal record
Women's swimming
Representing the United States
Pan American Games
Gold medal – first place	1967 Winnipeg	4x100 m medley
Silver medal – second place	1967 Winnipeg	200 m backstroke
Summer Universiade
Gold medal – first place	1967 Tokyo	100 m backstroke
Gold medal – first place	1967 Tokyo	4x100 m medley

Kendis Marion Moore (born November 23, 1948), also known by her married name Kendis Drake, is an American former competition swimmer, 1968 Mexico City Olympian, Pan American Games medalist, and former world record-holder.

At the 1967 Pan American Games in Winnipeg, Canada, Moore received the silver medal for her second-place performance in the 200-meter backstroke. She finished behind Canadian star Elaine Tanner and ahead of American teammate Cathy Ferguson.

== 1968 Olympics ==
Moore represented the United States at the 1968 Summer Olympics in Mexico City. She competed in the women's 100-meter backstroke, finishing in fourth place overall in the event final with a time of 1:08.3.

Moore attended Arizona State University where she was coached by Mona Plummer.

Moore broke two world records during her swimming career. She set a new world record in the 200-meter butterfly of 2:26.3 on August 15, 1965; it was broken six days later by Ada Kok of the Netherlands. She was also a member of a U.S. relay team that set a new world record in the 4×100-meter medley relay at the 1967 Pan American Games. The medley relay record survived for thirteen months until it was broken by another team of Americans in 1968.

After graduating from Arizona State where she studied nursing, she received a master's degree in the field. She was certified and worked as a nurse practitioner, focusing on gynecology and obstetrics. Unable to find an easily obtainable and accessible book in her field, she authored Preparing for a Healthy Baby, a valuable and useful primer for women anticipating a newborn.

== See also ==
- List of Arizona State University alumni
- World record progression 200 metres butterfly
- World record progression 4 × 100 metres medley relay
