= Kristina Moir =

Puerto Rican swimmer (born 1951)

Personal information
- Born: 10 April 1951 (age 75) Hawaii, United States

Sport
- Sport: Swimming
Medal record
Representing Puerto Rico
Pan American Games
| Bronze medal – third place | 1967 Winnipeg | 4x100m freestyle relay |
Central American and Caribbean Games
| Gold medal – first place | 1966 San Juan | 4x100m freestyle relay |

Kristina Moir (born 10 April 1951) is a Puerto Rican former swimmer. She competed in seven events at the 1968 Summer Olympics.

== Early life ==
Moir was born on 10 April 1951 in Hawaii.

== Career ==
Moir competed for Puerto Rico at the 1968 Summer Olympics in Mexico City, Mexico. She contested the women's 100 m freestyle, the women's 200 m freestyle, the women's 400 m freestyle, the women's 800 m freestyle, the women's 200 m butterfly, the women's 200 m individual medley and the women's 4 x 100 m medley relay. She was also entered in the women's 100 m butterfly and the women's 400 m individual medley but did not start either event.

The heats for the women's 4 x 100 m medley relay took place on 17 October 1968. Moir completed her leg in one minute 17.6 seconds as Puerto Riso finished seventh in their heat. They did not advance to the finals.

The heats for the women's 100 m freestyle took place on 18 October 1968. Moir finished eighth in her heat in a time of one minute 7.9 seconds and she did not advance to the semi-finals.

The heats for the women's 400 m freestyle took place on 19 October 1968. Moir finished third in her heat in a time of four minutes 57.7 seconds and she did not advance to the finals.

The heats for the women's 200 m individual medley took place on 20 October 1968. Moir finished fifth in her heat in a time of two minutes 42.8 seconds and she did not advance to the finals.

The heats for the women's 200 m freestyle took place on 21 October 1968. Moir finished fifth in her heat in a time of two minutes 23.1 seconds and she did not advance to the final.

The heats for the women's 800 m freestyle took place on 22 October 1968. Moir finished fourth in her heat in a time of 10 minutes 24.5 seconds and she did not advance to the finals.

The heats for the women's 200 m butterfly took place on 24 October 1968. Moir finished sixth in her heat in a time of two minutes 51.1 seconds and she did not advance to the finals.
