= Nguyễn Minh Tam =

Vietnamese swimmer

Personal information
- Born: 26 August 1950 (age 75) Saigon, Vietnam

Sport
- Sport: Swimming

Nguyễn Minh Tam (born 26 August 1950) is a Vietnamese former swimmer. She competed in the women's 100 metre freestyle at the 1968 Summer Olympics for South Vietnam. She was the first woman to represent South Vietnam at the Olympics.
