= Vivian Ortiz =

Mexican swimmer

Personal information
- Born: 30 December 1948 (age 77) Mexico City, Mexico

Sport
- Sport: Swimming

Vivian Ortiz (born 30 December 1948) is a Mexican swimmer. She competed in the women's 100 metre freestyle at the 1968 Summer Olympics.
