= Uta Schmuck =

East German swimmer

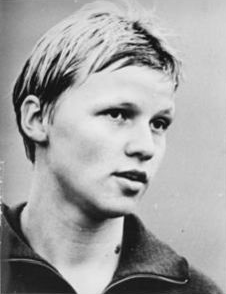
- Uta Schmuck in 1968

Personal information
- Born: 19 August 1949 (age 76) Limbach-Oberfrohna, Soviet occupation zone in Germany
- Height: 1.64 m (5 ft 5 in)
- Weight: 55 kg (121 lb)

Sport
- Sport: Swimming
- Club: SC Karl-Marx-Stadt, Chemnitz
Medal record
Representing East Germany
Olympic Games
Silver medal – second place	1968 Mexico City	4×100 m freestyle

Uta Schmuck (later Hoffmann; born 19 August 1949) is a retired German swimmer. Born in Limbach-Oberfrohna, Soviet Occupied Zone, she competed for East Germany in the 1968 Summer Olympics.

She qualified for the women's 100 metre freestyle, the women's 4×100 m freestyle relay, and, as part of a team of four that included Helga Lindner, the women's 4×100 m medley relay. She, Roswitha Krause, Gabriele Perthes, and Gabriele Wetzko won a silver medal in the women's 4×100 m freestyle relay. The women's 4×100 m medley relay team came in fifth.
