= Aloysia (disambiguation) =

Aloysia is a genus of flowering plants. It is also a feminine given name that may refer to the following people

== First name ==
- Aloysia Weber (1760 – 1839), German soprano
- Aloysia Sygaea Toletana (1522 – 1560), Spanish poet

== Middle name ==
- Anna Aloysia Maximiliane von Lamberg (? - 1738), Austrian countess
- Maria Aloysia of Dietrichstein (1700 – 1783), German noblewoman
- Mary Aloysia Hardey (1809 – 1886), American religious sister

== See also ==
- Aloisia
