= Gabriele Wetzko =

Former German swimmer

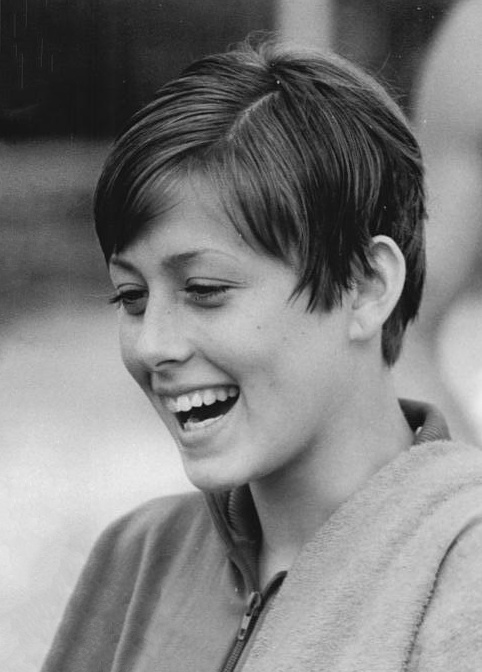
- Gabriele Wetzko in 1970

Medal record

Women's swimming

Representing East Germany

Summer Olympic Games
Silver medal – second place	1968 Mexico City	4×100 m freestyle
Silver medal – second place	1972 Munich	4×100 m freestyle
Silver medal – second place	1972 Munich	4×100 m medley

European Championships
Gold medal – first place	1970 Barcelona	200 m freestyle
Gold medal – first place	1970 Barcelona	100 m freestyle
Gold medal – first place	1970 Barcelona	4×100 m medley
Gold medal – first place	1970 Barcelona	4×100 m freestyle

Gabriele Wetzko (later Hartung then Frischke then Kühne , born 24 August 1954 in Leipzig) is a former German swimmer. Born in Leipzig, East Germany, she competed for East Germany in the 1968 and 1972 Summer Olympics.

At the 1968 Olympics she competed in the 200 m, 400 m and 4 × 100 m freestyle events. The 4 × 100 m freestyle East German team of Gabriele Wetzko, Uta Schmuck, Gabriele Perthes and Roswitha Krause won a silver medal.

At the 1970 European Aquatics Championships in Barcelona, she won four gold medals: in the 100 m and 200 m freestyle, as well as in the 4×100 medley and 4×100 m freestyle relays.

At the 1972 Olympics she competed in the 100 m freestyle, 4×100 m medley relay and 4×100 m freestyle relay, where her team, once again, won the silver medal.

In 1973, she completed her swimming career and began studying for a medical degree, later receiving a degree in economics as well. She married the swimmer Wilfried Hartung on 15 September 1973 but they divorced soon after.
