= Ad Duss =

- Location within United Arab Emirates
- Coordinates: 25°54′30″N 56°23′31″E
- Country: Oman

Ad Duss is a village in Oman.

A nearby town is Limah (2.7 nm).
