= Alberto Varela (businessman) =

Argentine ayahuasca entrepreneur (1960–2023)

Alberto José Varela was an Argentine businessman who ran Inner Mastery, an organisation based in Spain that offers ayahuasca therapy and that has been the subject of police investigations and criminal charges. He died in October 2023.

== Biography ==
=== Early life and career ===
Alberto José Varela was born in Santa Fe, Argentina, in 1960. He opened his first company, selling clothes, at the age of 17, and by the time he was 30, he had a wife and three kids. After his wife left him, he started a consulting firm with a partner. In 1999, Varela followed his ex-wife and kids to Madrid, Spain, and a year later, he had his first experience with ayahuasca, in Bogotá, Colombia. Upon his return to Spain, he opened an alternative medicine centre. By the mid-2000s, he began offering ayahuasca ceremonies and opened several more centres. At the time, it was possible to import ayahuasca into the country, as its legal status was uncertain.

In 2008, Varela was arrested for "crimes against public health" after one of his villas was raided and 40 kilograms of ayahuasca were discovered. Reportedly, there were 21 people (including three children) in the house, watching pornography while they waited to take part in an ayahuasca ceremony. Varela was imprisoned for 14 months. Released in 2011, he immediately set out to expand his business, publishing a memoir as well as a free magazine that promoted new-age therapies.

=== Inner Mastery ===
In 2013, Varela purchased a Facebook group focused on ayahuasca use among Westerners and launched a community he called Ayahuasca International. Later that year, he created the School of Ayahuasca, a training academy for people interested in self-administering the psychedelic brew. Both entities fell under the umbrella of Inner Mastery, which had been formed that year.

In 2015, the Cofán community in Putumayo Department, Colombia, who Varela claimed had certified him as the first Westerner to administer ayahuasca ceremonies, and from whom he sourced the plants, claimed he was an impostor who had never received such authorisation. They also accused him of reneging on his promise of financial remittances. Varela threatened to sue the community, and Inner Mastery conferences in the United States began experiencing protests from Indigenous people.

Incidents connected to Inner Mastery began to be reported, including that of a Hungarian man who appeared to have committed suicide shortly after attending an event held in Eindhoven, Netherlands, in 2019. Several arrests subsequently took place at the centre hosting the event, and three individuals were charged with drug-related offences. A second death was reported in Haarlem, Netherlands, later the same year, and two drug-related convictions followed in 2022.

Investigations of Inner Mastery began in the 2020s. In 2023, a villa in Madrid was raided by riot police, at the same time as five other retreat centres in Spain, leading to several arrests, including Varela, for drug possession.

At its peak, the organization offered ayahuasca retreats in 40 different countries, with over 130 staff running 1,000 retreats for 30,000 customers each year in centres that operated like communes. It also had a travel agency, a streaming service, and even its own cryptocurrency. By 2025, after the 2023 death of its founder as well as numerous court cases and legal complaints, Inner Mastery was only active in 13 countries.

=== Death ===
Varela, who had been diagnosed with a brain tumour in July 2023, died in October. At the time of his death, he was facing criminal charges of drug possession and sexual assault.
