= Aloisia Kirschner =

Austrian novelist

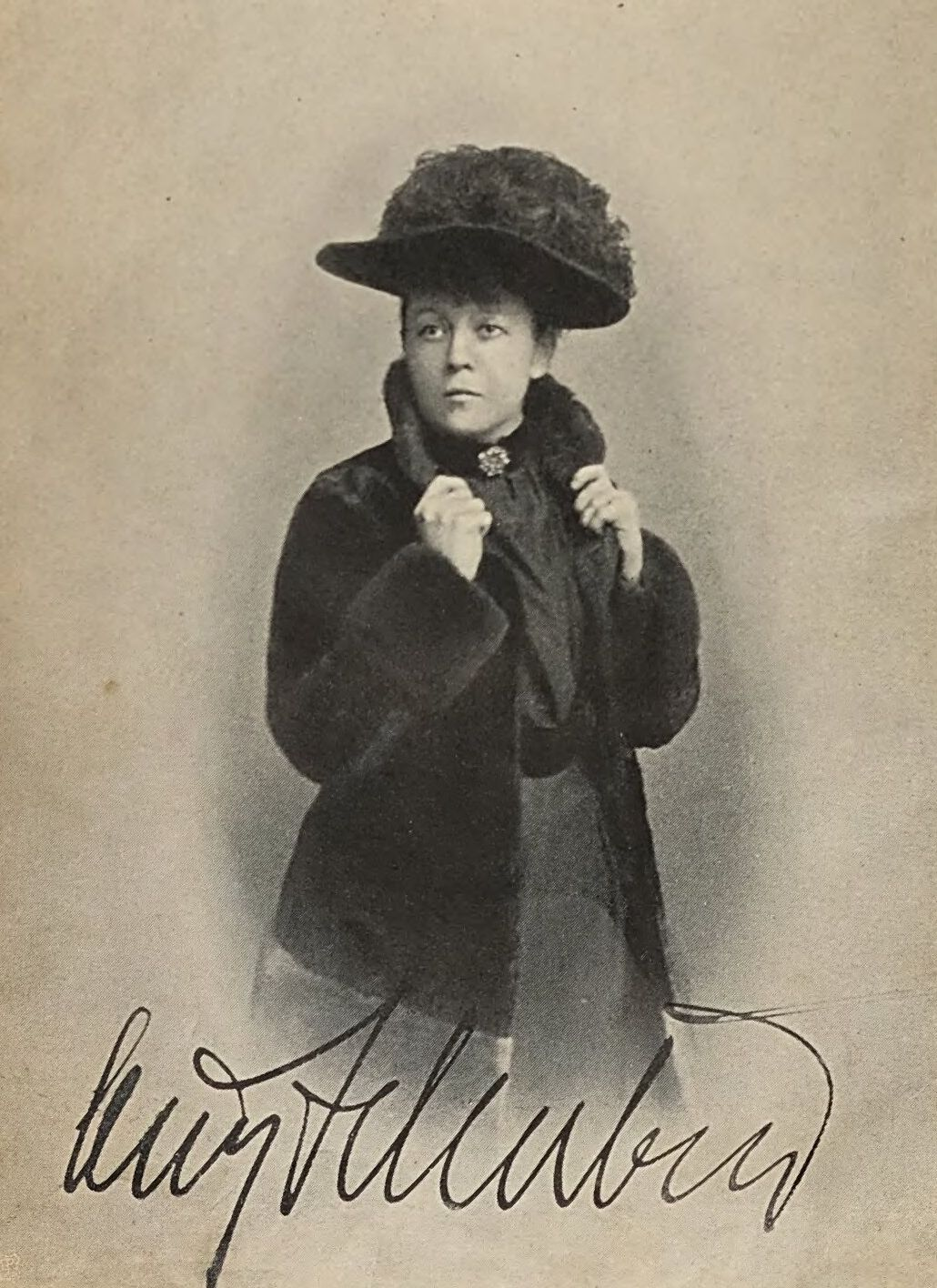
- Born: 17 June 1854; Prague
- Died: 10 February 1934 (aged 79); Bohemia
- Other name: Ossip Schubin
- Occupation: Writer

Aloisia Kirschner (17 June 1854 – 10 February 1934) was an Austrian novelist, born in Prague and favorably known under her pseudonym Ossip Schubin, which she borrowed from the novel Helena by Ivan Turgenev.

Brought up on her parents' estate at Lochkov, she afterward spent several winters in Brussels, Paris, and Rome, all inspirations for her descriptions of artistic Bohemianism and international fashionable society. Her gift for sarcasm is especially apparent in her delineations of the military and artistic circles in Austria-Hungary.

She died in 1934 at Košátky Castle, Bohemia.

== Works ==
- Ehre (1882; seventh edition, 1893)
- Die Geschichte eines Genies: Die Galbrizzi (1884)
- Unter uns (1884; fourth edition, 1892)
- Gloria Victis (1885; third edition, 1892)
- Erlachof (1887)
- Es fiel ein Reif in der Frühlingsnacht (fourth edition, 1901)
- Asbeïn, aus dem Leben eines Virtuosen (1888; fourth edition, 1901), and its sequel, Boris Lensky (1889; third edition, 1897)
- Unheimliche Geschichten (1889)
- O du mein Oesterreich! (1890; third edition, 1897)
- Finis Poloniœ (1893)
- Toter Frühling (1893)
- Gebrochene Flügel (1894)
- Die Heimkehr (1897)
- Slawische Liebe (1900)
- Marska (1902)
- Refugium peccatorum (1903)
- Der Gnadenschuss (1905)
- Der arme Nicki (1906)
- Primavera (1908)
- Miserere nobis (1910)
