= Linda Gustavson =

American swimmer (born 1949)

Personal information
- Full name: Linda Lee Gustavson
- National team: United States
- Born: November 30, 1949 (age 76) Santa Cruz, California, U.S.
- Height: 5 ft 9 in (175 cm)
- Weight: 134 lb (61 kg)

Sport
- Sport: Swimming
- Strokes: Freestyle
- Club: Santa Clara Swim Club
- College team: Michigan State University
Medal record
Women's swimming
Representing the United States
Olympic Games
Gold medal – first place	1968 Mexico City	4×100 m freestyle
Silver medal – second place	1968 Mexico City	400 m freestyle
Bronze medal – third place	1968 Mexico City	100 m freestyle
Pan American Games
Gold medal – first place	1967 Winnipeg	4x100 m freestyle
Summer Universiade
Gold medal – first place	1967 Tokyo	100 m freestyle
Gold medal – first place	1967 Tokyo	400 m freestyle
Gold medal – first place	1967 Tokyo	4x100 m freestyle
Gold medal – first place	1967 Tokyo	4x100 m medley

Linda Lee Gustavson (born November 30, 1949), also known by her married name Linda McGuire, is an American former competition swimmer, three-time Olympic medalist, and surpassed world record-holder in two events. As an 18-year-old, she was on the United States Olympic team at the 1968 Summer Olympics in Mexico City, a medalist in the three events she competed in.

== Career ==
Gustavson was a product of the powerhouse training program at the Santa Clara Swim Club, led by coach George Haines. The club trained U.S. Olympic level swimmers during the 1960s and 1970s, including eight men and eight women of the 1968 U.S. Olympic swimming team.

She received a gold medal as a member of the first-place U.S. team in the women's 4×100-meter freestyle relay (4:02.5). Together with her teammates Jane Barkman, Sue Pedersen and Jan Henne, she set a new Olympic record of 4:02.5 in the event final. In individual competition, she also won a silver medal in the 400-meter freestyle (4:35.5), and a bronze medal in the 100-meter freestyle (1:00.3).

Gustavson attended Michigan State University with fellow Olympic swimmer Pam Kruse, and the two friends joined Kappa Alpha Theta sorority. She swam for the Michigan State Spartans swimming and diving team in Association for Intercollegiate Athletics for Women (AIAW) and Big Ten Conference competition, and she and Kruse won the Big Ten championship in the 400-yard freestyle relay in 1971. Gustavson graduated from Michigan State in 1972.

== See also ==
- List of Michigan State University people
- List of Olympic medalists in swimming (women)
- World record progression 200 metres freestyle
- World record progression 4 × 100 metres freestyle relay
