= Sigrid Goral =

East German swimmer

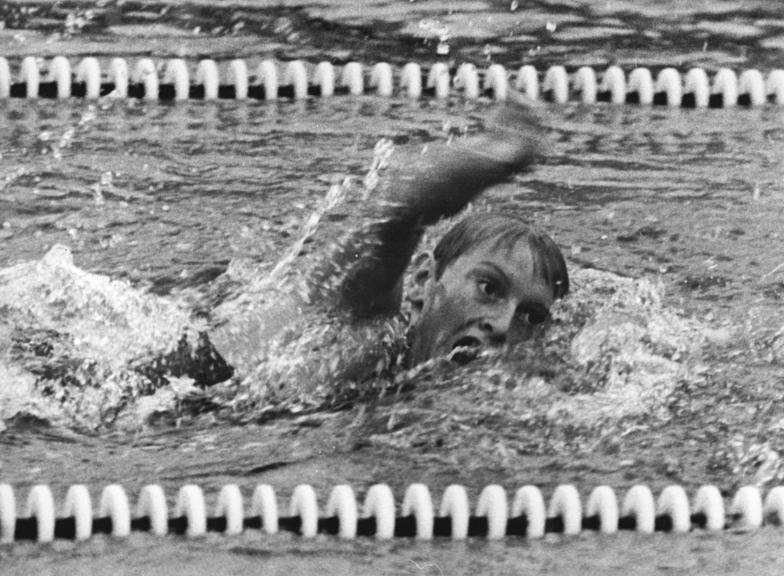
- Sigrid Goral in 1968

Personal information
- Born: 15 January 1952 (age 74) Brandenburg an der Havel, Germany
- Height: 1.62 m (5 ft 4 in)
- Weight: 55 kg (121 lb)

Sport
- Sport: Swimming
- Club: SC Empor Rostock

Sigrid Goral (born 15 January 1952) is a retired East German swimmer. In 1968 she won the national championships in the 800 m freestyle and set a European record at 9'43.5. However, later at the 1968 Summer Olympics she swam a mere 10'09.3 and failed to reach the final.
