= Hrafnhildur Guðmundsdóttir =

Icelandic swimmer

Personal information
- Born: 9 July 1943 (age 83) Reykjavík, Iceland

Sport
- Sport: Swimming

Hrafnhildur Guðmundsdóttir (born 9 July 1943) is an Icelandic former freestyle and medley swimmer. She competed at the 1964 Summer Olympics and the 1968 Summer Olympics.
