= Simone Hanner =

French swimmer

Personal information
- Born: 30 July 1949 (age 76) New Caledonia

Sport
- Sport: Swimming

Simone Hanner (born 30 July 1949) is a French former swimmer. She competed in two events at the 1968 Summer Olympics.
