= Danièle Dorléans =

French swimmer

Personal information
- Born: 23 March 1947 (age 79) Marseille, France

Sport
- Sport: Swimming

Danièle Dorléans (born 23 March 1947) is a French former freestyle and medley swimmer. She competed in three events at the 1968 Summer Olympics.
