= Felicia Ospitaletche =

Uruguayan swimmer

Personal information
- Born: 7 December 1953 (age 72) Montevideo, Uruguay

Sport
- Sport: Swimming

Felicia Ospitaletche (born 7 December 1953) is a Uruguayan former swimmer. She competed at the 1968 Summer Olympics and the 1972 Summer Olympics.
