= Maria Strumolo =

Italian swimmer (born 1949)

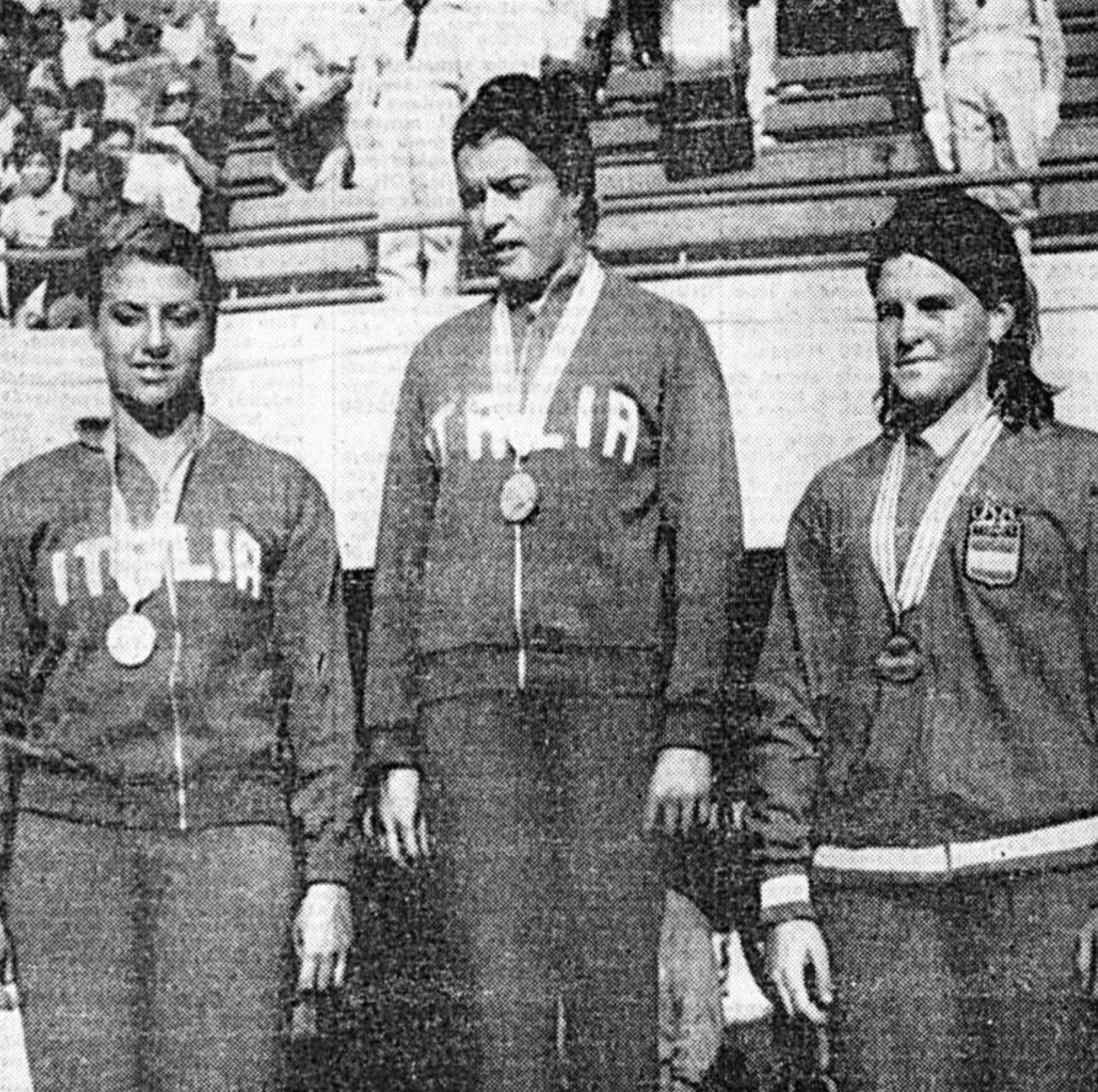
- The athletes Mara Sacchi (left), Maria Antonietta Strumolo (center) and Maria Teresa Bringas (right) on the podium, during the awarding of the 100 m freestyle, at the V Mediterranean Games in Tunis 1967.

Personal information
- Full name: Maria Antonietta Strumolo
- Born: 31 May 1949 (age 77) Milan, Italy

Sport
- Sport: Swimming
Medal record
Representing Italy
Mediterranean Games
Gold medal – first place	1967 Tunis	100m freestyle

Maria Antonietta Strumolo (born 31 May 1949) is an Italian former swimmer. She competed in two events at the 1968 Summer Olympics.
