= Oei Liana =

American swimmer

Personal information
- Born: 30 November 1952 (age 73)

Sport
- Sport: Swimming

Oei Liana
- Traditional Chinese: 黃蓮花
- Hanyu Pinyin: Huáng Liánhuā
- Hokkien POJ: Ûiⁿ Liânhoa

Oei Liana (born 30 November 1952) is an American former swimmer of Chinese Indonesian background who represented the Republic of China (Taiwan) in international competition. She competed in six events at the 1968 Summer Olympics.

Oei is from New Rochelle, New York, and took swimming lessons at the Catholic Youth Organization in Yonkers.
