= Marjatta Hara =

Finnish swimmer

Marjatta Hara-Pietilä
Personal information
- Born: 7 June 1951 (age 75) Helsinki, Finland

Sport
- Sport: Swimming

Marjatta Hara-Pietilä (née Hara, born 7 June 1951) is a Finnish architect and former freestyle swimmer. She competed in two events at the 1968 Summer Olympics.
