= Alberto Varela (fencer) =

Uruguayan fencer

Personal information
- Born: 16 November 1940 Montevideo, Uruguay
- Died: 20 June 2015 (aged 74)

Sport
- Sport: Fencing

Alberto Varela (16 November 1940 – 20 June 2015) was a Uruguayan fencer. He competed in the individual foil and épée events at the 1968 Summer Olympics.
