= Olga Kozičová =

Slovak swimmer

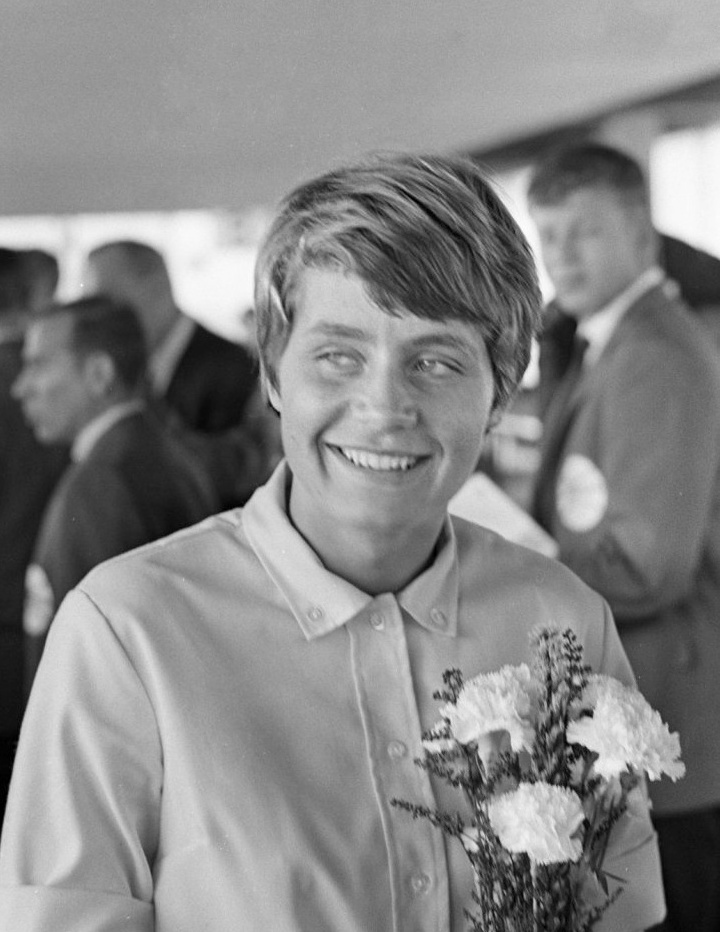
- Olga Kozičová in 1968

Personal information
- Born: 25 June 1951 Bratislava, Czechoslovakia
- Died: 26 January 2016 (aged 64) Wiener Neustadt
- Height: 1.71 m (5 ft 7 in)
- Weight: 68 kg (150 lb)

Sport
- Sport: Swimming
- Club: Slávia Bratislava

Olga Kozičová (25 June 1951 – 26 January 2016) was a Slovak swimmer. She competed at the 1968 Summer Olympics in the 100 m and 200 m individual freestyle and finished in eighth place in the latter event.
