= Shen Bao-ni =

Taiwanese swimmer

Personal information
- Full name: 沈 寶妮, Pinyin: Shěn Bǎo-nī
- Born: 13 July 1954 (age 72) Zhejiang, China

Sport
- Sport: Swimming
- Strokes: Freestyle, backstroke, and individual medley
Medal record
Representing Republic of China
Asian Games
Bronze medal – third place	1970 Bangkok	4x100m freestyle relay

Shen Bao-ni (born 13 July 1954) is a Taiwanese former swimmer. She competed in six events at the 1968 Summer Olympics.
