= Claude Mandonnaud =

French swimmer

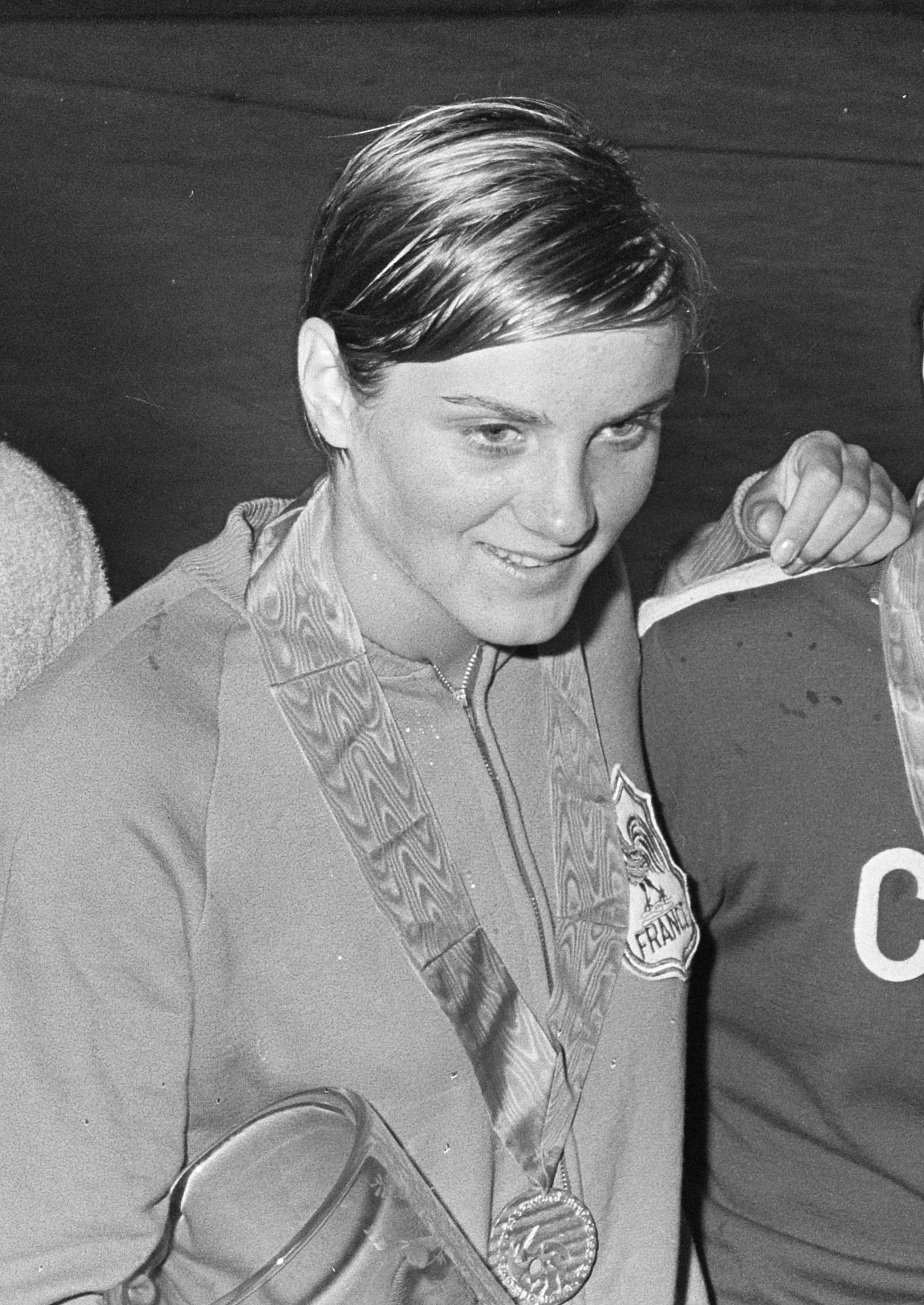
- Claude Mandonnaud in 1966

Medal record

Women's swimming

Representing France

European Championships
Gold medal – first place	1966 Utrecht	400 m freestyle
Bronze medal – third place	1974 Vienna	4×100 m freestyle

Claude Mandonnaud (born 2 April 1950 in Limoges) is a retired French freestyle swimmer who won two medals at the 1966 and 1974 European Aquatics Championships. She also participated in the 1968 and 1972 Summer Olympics with the best achievement of sixth place in the 200 m freestyle event in 1968.
