= Marcia Arriaga =

Mexican swimmer (born 1955)

Personal information
- Born: 18 October 1955 (age 70) Acapulco, Mexico

Sport
- Sport: Swimming
Medal record
Representing Mexico
Pan American Games
Bronze medal – third place	1971 Cali	4x100m medley relay
Central American and Caribbean Games
Gold medal – first place	1970 Panama City	4x100m freestyle relay

Marcia Arriaga (born 18 October 1955) is a Mexican former freestyle swimmer. She competed at the 1968 Summer Olympics and the 1972 Summer Olympics.
