= Zoya Dus =

Ukrainian swimmer

Personal information
- Nationality: Ukrainian
- Born: 24 November 1952 (age 73) Luhansk, Soviet Union

Sport
- Sport: Swimming

Zoya Dus (Ukrainian: Зоя Вікторівна Дусь, born 24 November 1952) is a Ukrainian former freestyle swimmer. She competed in two events at the 1968 Summer Olympics for the Soviet Union.
