= Dominique Mollier =

French swimmer

Personal information
- Born: 7 September 1949 (age 76) Chambéry, France

Sport
- Sport: Swimming

Dominique Mollier (born 7 September 1949) is a French former freestyle swimmer. She competed in two events at the 1968 Summer Olympics.
