= Aloisia Bauer =

German swimmer (born 1951)

Personal information
- Born: 11 June 1951 (age 75) Regensburg, Germany

Sport
- Sport: Swimming

Aloisia Bauer (born 11 June 1951) is a German former swimmer. She competed in two events at the 1968 Summer Olympics.
