= Ruth Apt =

Uruguayan swimmer (born 1953)

Personal information
- Born: 25 March 1953 (age 73) Montevideo, Uruguay

Sport
- Sport: Swimming
Medal record
Representing Uruguay
Pan American Games
| Bronze medal – third place | 1967 Winnipeg | 4x100m medley relay |

Ruth Evelyn Apt Leheimer (born 25 March 1953) is a Uruguayan former swimmer. She competed in six events at the 1968 Summer Olympics.
