= Elisabeth Berglund =

Swedish swimmer (born 1949)

Personal information
- Born: 26 May 1949 Timrå, Sweden
- Height: 1.67 m (5 ft 6 in)
- Weight: 51 kg (112 lb)

Sport
- Sport: Swimming
- Club: Timrå AIF
Medal record
Women's swimming
Representing Sweden
European Championships
| Bronze medal – third place | 1970 Barcelona | 4×100 m freestyle |

Gudrun Elisabeth Berglund (born 26 May 1949) is a retired Swedish swimmer who won a bronze medal at the 1970 European Aquatics Championships. She competed in three freestyle events at the 1968 Summer Olympics, but was eliminated in preliminaries.

Berglund was born in Timrå and started swimming in a club in 1960–1961; she later moved to Ytterhogdal. After retirement from swimming she worked as a gym coach and teacher of Swedish to foreigners. She is a board member of the Swedish Ski Association.
