= Roswitha Krause =

German sportswoman (born 1949)

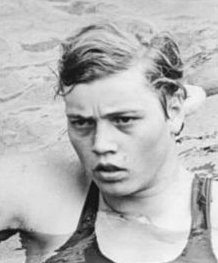
- Krause in 1968

Personal information
- Born: 3 November 1949 (age 76) Dahme, East Germany
- Height: 1.75 m (5 ft 9 in)
- Weight: 74 kg (163 lb)

Sport
- Sport: Swimming, handball
- Club: SC Dynamo Berlin; Berliner TSC
Medal record
Representing East Germany
Women's swimming
Olympic Games
Silver medal – second place	1968 Mexico City	4×100 m freestyle
Women's handball
Olympic Games
Silver medal – second place	1976 Montreal	Team
Bronze medal – third place	1980 Moscow	Team
World Championships
Gold medal – first place	1975 Soviet Union	Team
Gold medal – first place	1978 Czechoslovakia	Team

Roswitha Krause (born 3 November 1949) is a retired German freestyle swimmer and team handball player. She is the first woman to win Summer Olympic medals in two different sports. Krause won a silver medal at the 1968 Summer Olympics in Mexico in the 4×100 m freestyle relay.

== Biography ==
She then focused on handball and won a silver and a bronze medal with East German teams at the 1976 and 1980 Olympics, respectively, as well as two world titles in 1975 and 1978 and three European Cups. Meanwhile, she continued winning national titles in swimming through late 1970s.

She took up swimming because her doctor advised it to improve her shoulder condition; however, she noted in 1970 that her heart was always for ball sports, handball or football. In 1970 she started training in handball and for about a year did both swimming and handball every week. After that she focused on handball and by 1973 was part of the national team. She retired after the 1980 Olympics to coach handball and swimming at the Humboldt University.

== See also ==
- Dual sport and multi-sport Olympians
