= Marie-José Kersaudy =

French swimmer

Personal information
- Nationality: French
- Born: 27 February 1954 (age 72) Paris, France

Sport
- Sport: Swimming

Marie-José Kersaudy (born 27 February 1954) is a French former swimmer. She competed in four events at the 1968 Summer Olympics.
