= Patricia Olano =

Colombian swimmer

Personal information
- Born: 24 August 1950 Cali, Colombia
- Died: March 2021 (aged 70)

Sport
- Sport: Swimming

Patricia Olano (24 August 1950 – March 2021) was a Colombian swimmer. She competed in five events at the 1968 Summer Olympics.
