= María Teresa Ramírez =

Mexican swimmer (born 1954)

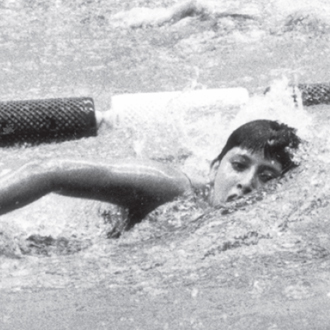

Personal information
- Full name: María Teresa Ramírez Gómez
- Born: August 15, 1954 (age 71) Mexico City, Mexico
- Height: 1.71 m (5 ft 7 in)
- Weight: 62 kg (137 lb)

Sport
- Sport: Swimming
- Strokes: Freestyle, Backstroke
Medal record
Women's swimming
Representing Mexico
Olympic Games
Bronze medal – third place	1968 Mexico City	800 m freestyle
Pan American Games
Bronze medal – third place	1971 Cali	800 m freestyle
Bronze medal – third place	1971 Cali	4x100 m medley
Central American and Caribbean Games
Gold medal – first place	1970 Panama City	100m freestyle
Gold medal – first place	1970 Panama City	200m freestyle
Gold medal – first place	1970 Panama City	800m freestyle
Gold medal – first place	1970 Panama City	100m backstroke
Gold medal – first place	1970 Panama City	200m backstroke
Gold medal – first place	1970 Panama City	100m butterfly
Gold medal – first place	1970 Panama City	4x100m freestyle relay

María Teresa Ramírez Gómez (Note: In this Mexican name, the surname is Ramírez and the second or maternal family name is Gómez.) (born August 15, 1954, in Mexico City) is a Mexican former freestyle and backstroke swimmer. She represented Mexico at two consecutive Summer Olympics, starting in Mexico City (1968). She won the bronze medal in the Women's 800m Freestyle event at the 1968 Summer Olympics.
