= Silvana Asturias =

Guatemalan swimmer (born 1953)

Personal information
- Born: 27 August 1953 (age 72) Guatemala City, Guatemala

Sport
- Sport: Swimming

Silvana Asturias (born 27 August 1953) is a former Guatemalan swimmer. She competed in four events at the 1968 Summer Olympics.
