= Emilia Figueroa =

Uruguayan swimmer

Personal information
- Born: 11 September 1953 (age 72) Montevideo, Uruguay

Sport
- Sport: Swimming

Emilia Figueroa (born 11 September 1953) is a Uruguayan former swimmer. She competed in six events at the 1968 Summer Olympics.
