= Lylian Castillo =

Uruguayan swimmer (born 1953)

Personal information
- Born: 1 July 1953 (age 73) Montevideo, Uruguay

Sport
- Sport: Swimming
Medal record
Representing Uruguay
Pan American Games
Bronze medal – third place	1967 Winnipeg	4x100m medley relay

Lylian Castillo (born 1 July 1953) is a Uruguayan former swimmer. She competed in five events at the 1968 Summer Olympics.
