= Mexico at the 1968 Summer Olympics =

- IOC code: MEX
- NOC: Mexican Olympic Committee

in Mexico City
- Competitors: 275 (233 men and 42 women) in 20 sports
- Flag bearer: David Bárcena
- Medals Ranked 15th: Gold 3 Silver 3 Bronze 3 Total 9

Summer Olympics appearances (overview)
- 1900; 1904–1920; 1924; 1928; 1932; 1936; 1948; 1952; 1956; 1960; 1964; 1968; 1972; 1976; 1980; 1984; 1988; 1992; 1996; 2000; 2004; 2008; 2012; 2016; 2020; 2024

Mexico was the host nation for the 1968 Summer Olympics in Mexico City. 275 competitors, 233 men and 42 women, took part in 146 events in 20 sports.

== Medalists ==
Mexico won a total of 9 medals (3 of each) which is to date the fewest medals won by a host nation at a Summer Olympics. This is nevertheless the highest number of both gold and overall medals that Mexico has ever won at an Olympics.

Medal	Name	Sport	Event	Date
Gold	Ricardo Delgado	Boxing	Men's flyweight	26 October
Gold	Antonio Roldán	Boxing	Men's featherweight	26 October
Gold	Felipe Muñoz	Swimming	Men's 200 m breaststroke	22 October
Silver	José Pedraza	Athletics	Men's 20 km walk	14 October
Silver	Pilar Roldán	Fencing	Women's foil	20 October
Silver	Álvaro Gaxiola	Diving	Men's 10 m platform	26 October
Bronze	Agustín Zaragoza	Boxing	Men's middleweight	24 October
Bronze	Joaquín Rocha	Boxing	Men's heavyweight	24 October
Bronze	Maria Teresa Ramírez	Swimming	Women's 800 m freestyle	24 October

== Athletics ==
Key

- Note–Ranks given for track events are within the athlete's heat only
- Q = Qualified for the next round
- q = Qualified for the next round as a fastest loser or, in field events, by position without achieving the qualifying target

Men

Track and road events

Athlete	Events	Heat		Quarterfinal		Semifinal		Final	
Athlete	Events	Result	Rank	Result	Rank	Result	Rank	Result	Rank
Félix Bécquer	100 m	10.72	7	Did not advance					
Miguel Angel González	100 m	10.59	5	Did not advance					
Miguel Angel González	200 m	21.31	4 Q	21.57	8	Did not advance			
Melesio Piña	400 m	46.81	6	Did not advance					
Roberto Silva	800 m	1:50.4	5	—N/a		Did not advance			
José Neri	1500 m	3:47.88	6	—N/a		Did not advance			
Juan Máximo Martínez	5000 m	14:20.0	2 Q	—N/a				14:10.8	4
Juan Máximo Martínez	10,000 m	—N/a						29:35.0	4
Alejandro Sánchez	400 m hurdles	51.6	6	—N/a		did not advance			
Pedro Miranda	3000 m steeplechase	9:25.95	11	—N/a				did not advance	
Félix Bécquer; Galdino Flores; Miguel Angel González; Enrique Labadie	4 × 100 m relay	40.0	7	—N/a		did not advance			
Carlos Castro; Salvador Medina; Melesio Piña; Francisco Sardo	4 × 400 m relay	3:08.19	6	—N/a				did not advance	
José García	Marathon	—N/a						DNF	
Pablo Garrido	Marathon	—N/a						2:35:47	26
Alfredo Peñaloza	Marathon	—N/a						2:29:48	13
Eladio Campos	20 km walk	—N/a						1:41:52	20
José Oliveros	20 km walk	—N/a						1:38:17	13
José Pedraza	20 km walk	—N/a						1:34:00.0	2nd place, silver medalist(s)
Pablo Colín	50 km walk	—N/a						5:01:30.0	25
Ismael Hernández	50 km walk	—N/a						5:56:09.2	27
José Pedraza	50 km walk	—N/a						4:37:51.4	8

Field events

Athlete	Event	Qualification		Final	
Athlete	Event	Result	Rank	Result	Rank
Galdino Flores	Long jump	7.59	21	Did not advance	

Combined events – Decathlon

Athlete	100 m	LJ	SP	HJ	400 m	110H	DT	PV	JT	1500 m	Points	Rank
Roberto Carmona Botella	10.9	6.92	14.37	1.70	50.5	DNF						

Women

Track and road events

Athlete	Events	Heat		Quarterfinal		Semifinal		Final	
Athlete	Events	Result	Rank	Result	Rank	Result	Rank	Result	Rank
Esperanza Girón	100 m	12.2	7	Did not advance					
Esperanza Girón	200 m	25.3	7	Did not advance					
Enriqueta Basilio	400 m	55.6	5	—N/a		Did not advance			
Enriqueta Basilio	80 m hurdles	11.1	6	—N/a		Did not advance			
Enriqueta Basilio; Esperanza Girón; Alma Rosa Martínez; Mercedes Román	4 × 100 m relay	47.0	7	—N/a		Did not advance			

Field events

Athlete	Event	Qualification		Final	
Athlete	Event	Result	Rank	Result	Rank
Mercedes Román	Long jump	5.75	20	Did not advance	

Combined events – Pentathlon

Athlete	Event	80H	SP	HJ	LJ	200 m	Points	Rank
Mercedes Román	Result	11.3	10.08	NM	5.71	24.6	3604	31
Mercedes Román	Points	995	719	0	922	968	3604	31

== Basketball ==
Summary

Team	Event	Preliminary round								Semifinal / Pl.	Final / BM / Pl.	
Team	Event	Opposition Result	Opposition Result	Opposition Result	Opposition Result	Opposition Result	Opposition Result	Opposition Result	Rank	Opposition Result	Opposition Result	Rank
Mexico men's	Men's tournament	South Korea; W 75–62	Cuba; W 76–75	Brazil; L 53–60	Morocco; W 86–38	Bulgaria; W 73–63	Soviet Union; L 62–82	Poland; W 68–63	3	5th-8th place semifinal Spain; W 73–72	5th place final Poland; W 75–65	5

Team roster

Mexico men's national basketball team roster
Players
Coaches

Pos.	No.	Name	Age – Date of birth	Height	Club
	11	Alejandro Guzmán	22 – 8 December 1945	1.93 m (6 ft 4 in)
	8	Antonio Ayala	21 – 2 February 1947	2.00 m (6 ft 7 in)
	5	Arturo Guerrero	20 – 30 August 1948	1.92 m (6 ft 4 in)
	12	Carlos Quintanar	29 – 2 June 1939	1.94 m (6 ft 4 in)
	6	Fernando Tiscareño	23 – 12 August 1945	1.86 m (6 ft 1 in)
	14	John Hatch	21 – 4 January 1947	1.94 m (6 ft 4 in)
	10	Luis Grajeda	31 – 21 June 1937	1.79 m (5 ft 10 in)
	15	Manuel Raga	24 – 15 March 1944	1.87 m (6 ft 2 in)
	12	Miguel Arellano	27 – 10 February 1941	1.87 m (6 ft 2 in)
	13	Óscar Asiáin	19 – 21 February 1949	1.80 m (5 ft 11 in)
	14	Rafael Heredia	31 – 19 February 1937	1.90 m (6 ft 3 in)
	15	Rico Pontvianne	24 – 20 November 1943	1.89 m (6 ft 2 in)

Head coach

- (United States) Lester Lane

Legend

- Club – describes last
  club before the tournament
- Age – describes age
  on 13 October 1968

Group play

Pos	Team	Pld	W	L	PF	PA	PD	Pts	Qualification
1	Soviet Union	7	7	0	642	408	+234	14	Semifinals
2	Brazil	7	6	1	561	418	+143	13	Semifinals
3	Mexico	7	5	2	493	443	+50	12	5th–8th classification round
4	Poland	7	4	3	473	504	−31	11	5th–8th classification round
5	Bulgaria	7	3	4	456	478	−22	10	9th–12th classification round
6	Cuba	7	2	5	514	532	−18	9	9th–12th classification round
7	South Korea	7	1	6	453	530	−77	8	13th–16th classification round
8	Morocco	7	0	7	355	634	−279	7	13th–16th classification round

Updated to match(es) played on unknown. Source: FIBA archive
Rules for classification: 1) classification points; 2) head-to-head results; 3) head-to-head game points difference; 4) head-to-head number of game points scored.

13 October 1968

Mexico	75–62	South Korea
Scoring by half: 39–27, 36–35
Pts: Raga 19		Pts: Dong-pa 24

Palacio de los Deportes, Mexico City
Referees: Al Rae (CAN), Ervin Kassai (HUN)

14 October 1968

Mexico	76–75	Cuba
Scoring by half: 35–29, 41–46
Pts: Raga 33		Pts: García 21

Palacio de los Deportes, Mexico City
Referees: Mario Hopenhaym (URU), Theodor Schober (FRG)

15 October 1968

Mexico	53–60	Brazil
Scoring by half: 42–15, 44–23
Pts: Guerrero 25		Pts: Mimun 14

Palacio de los Deportes, Mexico City
Referees: Ryoichi Kanaka (JPN), Wayne Lichty (USA)

16 October 1968

Mexico	86–38	Morocco
Scoring by half: 37–13, 31–14
Pts: Guerrero 14		Pts: Soroudi 10

Palacio de los Deportes, Mexico City
Referees: Calvin Pacheco (POR), Elio Luglini (ITA)

18 October 1968

Mexico	73–63	Bulgaria
Scoring by half: 33–36, 40–27
Pts: Raga 30		Pts: Dimov 20

Palacio de los Deportes, Mexico City
Referees: Mario Hopenhaym (URU), Red Mihalik (USA)

19 October 1968

Mexico	62–82	Soviet Union
Scoring by half: 25–45, 37–37
Pts: Guzmán 20		Pts: Paulauskas 17

Palacio de los Deportes, Mexico City
Referees: Mario Hopenhaym (URU), Red Mihalik (USA)

20 October 1968

Mexico	68–63	Soviet Union
Scoring by half: 40–28, 28–35
Pts: Guerrero 20		Pts: Łopatka 31

Palacio de los Deportes, Mexico City
Referees: Ryoichi Kanaka (JPN), Santiago Fernández (ESP)

5th-8th place semifinal

22 October 1968

Mexico	73–72	Spain
Scoring by half: 31–3, 42–41
Pts: Guerrero 24		Pts: Luyk 32

Palacio de los Deportes, Mexico City
Attendance: 30,000
Referees: Anatoly Kokorev (URS), Wayne Lichty (USA)

5th place final

23 October 1968

Mexico	75–65	Poland
Scoring by half: 43–23, 32–42
Pts: Guerrero 19		Pts: Trams 19

Palacio de los Deportes, Mexico City
Referees: Al Rae (CAN), Anatoly Kokorev (URS)

== Boxing ==
Athlete	Event	Round of 64	Round of 32	Round of 16	Quarterfinals	Semifinals	Final	
Athlete	Event	Opposition Result	Opposition Result	Opposition Result	Opposition Result	Opposition Result	Opposition Result	Rank
Alberto Morales	Light flyweight	—N/a	Udella (ITA); W 3-2	Englmeier (GDR); W RSC	Yong-ju (KOR); L 2-3	Did not advance		5
Ricardo Delgado	Flyweight	—N/a	Bye	McCarthy (IRL); W 5-0	Nakamura (JPN); W 5-0	De Oliveira (BRA); W 5-0	Olech (POL); W 5-0	1st place, gold medalist(s)
Roberto Cervantes	Bantamweight	Bye	Gałązka (POL); W 5-0	Casco (ARG); W DSQ	Mukwanga (UGA); L 1-4	Did not advance		5
Antonio Roldán	Featherweight	—N/a	Abdel (SUD); W 5-0	Tracey (IRL); W 4-1	Plotnikov (URS); W 3-1	Waruinge (KEN); W 3-2	Robinson (USA); W DSQ	1st place, gold medalist(s)
José Antonio Duran	Lightweight	Bye	Azzaro (FRA); W RSC	Pilichev (BUL); L 1-4	Did not advance			9
Jaime Lozano	Light welterweight	Bye	Lawson (GHA); W 5-0	Tiepold (GDR); L 0-5	Did not advance			9
Alfonso Ramírez	Welterweight	Bye	Scano (ITA); W 3-2	Oikonomakos (GRE); W 4-1	Musalimov (URS); L 0-5	Did not advance		5
José Cebreros	Light middleweight	—N/a	El-Nahas (EGY); L K0	Did not advance				17
Agustín Zaragoza	Light middleweight	—N/a	Bye	Wright (JAM); W 5-0	Hejduk (TCH); W 4-1	Kiselyov (URS); L RSC	Did not advance	3rd place, bronze medalist(s)
Enrique Villarreal	Light heavyweight	—N/a	Bye	Ayinla (NGR); L RSC	Did not advance			17
Joaquín Rocha	Heavyweight	—N/a		Ray (GHA); W 4-1	Lubbers (NED); W 3-2	Čepulis (URS); L RSC	Did not advance	3rd place, bronze medalist(s)

== Canoeing ==
Athlete	Event	Heats		Repechage		Semifinals		Final	
Athlete	Event	Time	Rank	Time	Rank	Time	Rank	Time	Rank
Felipe Ojeda	Men's C-1 1000 m	4:47.3	6 SF	—N/a		4:43.20	4	did not advance	
Juan Martínez; Félix Altamirano	Men's C-2 1000 m	4:11.9	4 SF	—N/a		4:15.01	1 QF	4:15.24	4
Fidel Santander	Men's K-1 1000 m	4:28.8	7 R	4:30.09	4	did not advance			
Alonso Heinze; Jerónimo Gómez	Men's K-2 1000 m	4:09.9	4 R	4:11.57	5	did not advance			
Carlos Graeff; Luis Lozano; Roberto Heinze; Carlos Prendes	Men's K-4 1000 m	3:37.0	5 R	3:36.90	4	did not advance			
Ann Margarit Henningsen	Women's K-1 500 m	2:18.2	7 SF	—N/a		2:21.39	7	did not advance	
Ann Margarit Henningsen; Angelica Zawadzki	Women's K-2 500 m	2:15.3	6 SF	—N/a		2:10.11	5	did not advance	

Qualification Legend: QF = Qualify to final; SF = Qualify to semifinal; R=Repechage

== Cycling ==
=== Road ===
Athlete	Event	Time	Rank
Gabriel Cuéllar	Men's individual road race	Did not finish	
Heriberto Díaz	Men's individual road race	4:47:59	36
Agustín Juárez	Men's individual road race	4:46:32	27
Jesús Sarabia	Men's individual road race	4:51:5	43
Agustín Alcántara; Adolfo Belmonte; Roberto Brito; Radamés Treviño	Men's team time trial	2:16:8.44	10

=== Track ===
Sprint

Athlete	Event	Round 1	Repechage 1	Round 2	Repechage 2	1/8 finals	Repechage 3 heats	Repechage 3 finals	Quarterfinals	Semifinals	Final	
Athlete	Event	Opposition time	Opposition time	Opposition time	Opposition time	Opposition time	Opposition time	Opposition time	Opposition time	Opposition time	Opposition time	Rank
Arturo García	Men's sprint	Jansen (NED); L	Lovell (CAN); Guaves (PHI); L	Did not advance								
José Mercado	Men's sprint	Johnson (AUS); L	Reece (BAR); W 11.27	Kučírek (TCH); Barnett (GBR); L	King (TTO); Alsop (GBR); L	Did not advance						
Guillermo Mendoza; Julio Munguía	Men's tandem	Morelon (FRA) / Trentin (FRA); L	Bodnieks (URS) / Tselovalnikov (URS); Reyes (CUB) / Váldez (CUB); L	—N/a					Did not advance			

Pursuit

Athlete	Event	Qualification		Quarterfinals	Semifinals	Final / BM	
Athlete	Event	Time	Rank	Opponent Results	Opponent Results	Opponent Results	Rank
Radamés Treviño	Men's individual pursuit	4:44.12	7 Q	Bylsma (AUS); L 4:42.40	Did not advance		
Heriberto Díaz; Agustín Alcántara; Adolfo Belmonte; Radamés Treviño	Men's team pursuit	4:30.78	15	Did not advance			

Time trail

Athlete	Event	Time	Rank
José Mercado	Men's time trial	1:07.97	21

== Diving ==
Men

Athlete	Event	Preliminaries		Final			
Athlete	Event	Points	Rank	Points	Rank	Total	Rank
Luis Niño	3 m springboard	99.13	6 Q	56.58	3	155.71	4
José Robinson	3 m springboard	91.45	13	Did not advance			
Jorge Telch	3 m springboard	90.68	14	Did not advance			
Álvaro Gaxiola	10 m platform	103.33	2 Q	51.16	4	154.49	2nd place, silver medalist(s)
Luis Niño	10 m platform	93.66	6 Q	47.50	7	141.16	7
José Robinson	10 m platform	91.16	11 Q	52.46	3	143.62	5

Women

Athlete	Event	Preliminaries		Final			
Athlete	Event	Points	Rank	Points	Rank	Total	Rank
Bertha Baraldi	3 m springboard	80.47	17	Did not advance			
Bertha Baraldi	10 m platform	47.74	13	Did not advance			
Dora Hernández	10 m platform	46.96	16	Did not advance			

== Fencing ==
14 fencers, 9 men and 5 women, represented Mexico in 1968.

Men's foil

- Héctor Abaunza
- Carlos Calderón
- Román Gómez

Men's team foil

- Vicente Calderón, Román Gómez, Carlos Calderón, Gustavo Chapela, Héctor Abaunza

Men's épée

- Ernesto Fernández
- Carlos Calderón
- Valeriano Pérez

Men's team épée

- Carlos Calderón, Valeriano Pérez, Jorge Castillejos, Ernesto Fernández

Men's sabre

- Vicente Calderón
- William Fajardo
- Gustavo Chapela

Men's team sabre

- William Fajardo, Gustavo Chapela, Héctor Abaunza, Vicente Calderón, Román Gómez

Women's foil

- Pilar Roldán
- Lourdes Roldán
- Rosa del Moral

Women's team foil

- Pilar Roldán, Linda Béjar, Lourdes Roldán, Sonia Arredondo, Rosa del Moral

== Modern pentathlon ==
Three male pentathletes represented Mexico in 1968.

Individual

- Eduardo Olivera
- David Bárcena
- Eduardo Tovar

Team

- Eduardo Olivera
- David Bárcena
- Eduardo Tovar

== Shooting ==
Eleven shooters, ten men and one woman, represented Mexico in 1968.

25 m pistol

- Rafael Carpio
- Enrique Torres

50 m pistol

- Leopoldo Martínez
- Javier Peregrina

300 m rifle, three positions

- Olegario Vázquez
- José González

50 m rifle, three positions

- José González
- Olegario Vázquez

50 m rifle, prone

- Olegario Vázquez
- Jesús Elizondo

Trap

- Miguel Barrenechea
- Gustavo Zepeda

Skeet

- Nuria Ortíz
- Mario Pani

== Swimming ==
Men

Athlete	Event	Heat		Semifinal		Final	
Athlete	Event	Time	Rank	Time	Rank	Time	Rank
Maximiliano Aguilar	100 metre butterfly	1:04.0	41	Did not advance			
Eduardo Alanís	200 metre medley	2:23.0	22	Did not advance			
Eduardo Alanís	400 metre medley	5:14.9	21	Did not advance			
Juan Alanís	400 metre freestyle	4:27.4	15	Did not advance			
Juan Alanís	1500 metre freestyle	17:37.4	8 Q	—N/a		17:46.6	7
Gabriel Altamirano	200 metre butterfly	2:12.1	9	Did not advance			
Luis Angel Acosta	100 metre backstroke	1:06.5	31	Did not advance			
Luis Angel Acosta	200 metre backstroke	2:24.0	23	Did not advance			
Rafaél Cal	100 metre freestyle	56.5	33	Did not advance			
Guillermo Echevarría	200 metre freestyle	DNS		Did not advance			
Guillermo Echevarría	400 metre freestyle	4:24.0	11	Did not advance			
Guillermo Echevarría	1500 metre freestyle	17:11.0	2 Q	—N/a		17:36.4	6
Rafael Hernández	200 metre breaststroke	2:44.8	32	Did not advance			
Rafael Hernández	200 metre medley	2:24.7	29	Did not advance			
Rafael Hernández	400 metre medley	5:01.1	5 Q	—N/a		5:04.3	8
Javier Jiménez	100 metre breaststroke	1:16.3	36	Did not advance			
Eduardo Moreno	100 metre breaststroke	1:13.7	33	Did not advance			
Eduardo Moreno	200 metre breaststroke	2:46.7	34	Did not advance			
Felipe Muñoz	100 metre breaststroke	1:10.6	20 Q	1:09.4	11	Did not advance	
Felipe Muñoz	200 metre breaststroke	2:31.1	2 Q	—N/a		2:28.7	Gold medal
Jaime Rivera	100 metre backstroke	1:05.1	27	Did not advance			
Jaime Rivera	200 metre backstroke	2:20.7	15	Did not advance			
Salvador Ruiz	100 metre freestyle	56.4	31	Did not advance			
Salvador Ruiz	200 metre freestyle	DNS		Did not advance			
José Joaquín Santibáñez	100 metre backstroke	1:04.2	21	Did not advance			
José Joaquín Santibáñez	200 metre backstroke	2:20.7	15	Did not advance			
José Joaquín Santibáñez	200 metre medley	2:24.6	28	Did not advance			
Mario Santibáñez	100 metre freestyle	57.0	39	Did not advance			
Mario Santibáñez	100 metre butterfly	1:01.7	31	Did not advance			
Jorge Urreta	400 metre freestyle	4:34.3	23	Did not advance			
Jorge Urreta	1500 metre freestyle	17:57.5	14	Did not advance			
Raúl Villagómez	400 metre medley	5:24.7	31	Did not advance			
Raúl Villagómez	200 metre butterfly	2:22.4	25	Did not advance			
Salvador Ruiz; Mario Santibáñez; Eduardo Alanís; Rafaél Cal	4x100 metre freestyle	3:46.1	12	Did not advance			
Juan Alanís; Jorge Urreta; Rafaél Cal; Eduardo Alanís	4x200 metre freestyle	DSQ		Did not advance			
José Joaquín Santibáñez; Felipe Muñoz; Mario Santibáñez; Rafaél Cal	4x100 metre medley	4:10.0	12	Did not advance			

Women

Athlete	Event	Heat		Semifinal		Final	
Athlete	Event	Time	Rank	Time	Rank	Time	Rank
Norma Amezcua	400 metre freestyle	5:00.5	17	Did not advance			
Norma Amezcua	800 metre freestyle	10:31.6	20	Did not advance			
Norma Amezcua	400 metre medley	5:47.9	16	Did not advance			
Marcia Arriaga	100 metre freestyle	1:05.4	37	Did not advance			
Marcia Arriaga	200 metre freestyle	2:27.0	31	Did not advance			
Víctoria Casas	100 metre breaststroke	1:24.7	28	Did not advance			
Víctoria Casas	200 metre breaststroke	3:01.0	24	Did not advance			
Patricia Obregón	100 metre butterfly	1:12.4	20	Did not advance			
Vivian Ortíz	100 metre freestyle	1:06.9	47	Did not advance			
Tamara Oynick	100 metre breaststroke	1:22.7	25	Did not advance			
Tamara Oynick	200 metre breaststroke	2:52.4	11	Did not advance			
Tamara Oynick	400 metre medley	5:48.4	17	Did not advance			
Ana Elena de la Portilla	200 metre breaststroke	3:03.5	26	Did not advance			
María Teresa Ramírez	200 metre freestyle	2:17.5	11	Did not advance			
María Teresa Ramírez	400 metre freestyle	4:43.9	4 Q	—N/a		4:42.2	6
María Teresa Ramírez	800 metre freestyle	9:46.4	3 Q	—N/a		9:38.5	Bronze medal
Lidia Ramírez	100 metre backstroke	1:14.5	31	Did not advance			
Lidia Ramírez	200 metre butterfly	2:42.1	17	Did not advance			
Lidia Ramírez	200 metre medley	2:42.6	26	Did not advance			
Laura Vaca	400 metre freestyle	4:53.3	11	Did not advance			
Laura Vaca	800 metre freestyle	10:01.8	8 Q	—N/a		10:02.5	8
Laura Vaca	400 metre medley	5:33.7	8 Q	—N/a		5:35.7	8
María Teresa Ramírez; Laura Vaca; Marcia Arriaga; Norma Amezcua	4x100 metre freestyle	4:21.9	13	Did not advance			
Lidia Ramírez; Tamara Oynick; Patricia Obregón; María Teresa Ramírez	4x100 metre medley	4:51.0	12	Did not advance			

== Volleyball ==
Women's Team Competition

- Round Robin

- Lost to Peru (2-3)
- Lost to Japan (0-3)
- Lost to Czechoslovakia (0-3)
- Lost to Poland (2-3)
- Lost to South Korea (0-3)
- Lost to Soviet Union (0-3)
- Defeated United States (3-0) → Seventh place

- Team Roster

- Alicia Cárdeñas
- Blanca García
- Carolina Mendoza
- Eloisa Cabada
- Gloria Casales
- Gloria Inzua
- Isabel Nogueira
- María Rodríguez
- Patricia Nava
- Rogelia Romo
- Trinidad Macías
- Yolanda Reynoso

== Water polo ==
Men's Team Competition

- Preliminary Round (Group B)

- Lost to East Germany (4:12)
- Lost to Netherlands (1:8)
- Lost to Yugoslavia (0:9)
- Lost to Italy (5:10)
- Defeated Greece (11:8)
- Lost to Japan (3:6)
- Tied with United Arab Republic (3:3)

- Classification Matches

- 9th/12th place: Lost to West Germany (3:6)
- 11th/12th place: Defeated Japan (5:4) → Eleventh place

- Team Roster

- Carlos Morfin
- Daniel Gómez
- Francisco García Moreno
- Germán Chávez
- José Vásquez
- Juan García
- Luis Guzmán
- Oscar Familiar
- Rolando Chávez
- Sergio Ramos
- Virgilio Botella
