= Volleyball at the 1968 Summer Olympics – Women's team rosters =

List of volleyball players

The following teams and players took part in the women's volleyball tournament at the 1968 Summer Olympics, in Mexico City.

== Rosters ==
=== Czechoslovakia ===
- Anna Mifková
- Elena Moskalová-Poláková
- Eva Široká
- Hana Vlasáková
- Hilda Mazúrová
- Irena Tichá
- Jitka Senecká
- Júlia Bendeová
- Karla Šašková
- Pavlína Štefková
- Věra Hrabáková
- Věra Štruncová

Head coach

=== Japan ===
- Setsuko Yosjida
- Suzue Takayama
- Toyoko Iwahara
- Youko Kasahara
- Aiko Onozawa
- Yukiyo Kojima
- Sachiko Fukanaka
- Kunie Shishikura
- Setsuko Inoue
- Sumie Oinuma
- Makiko Furakawa
- Keiko Hama

Head coach

=== Mexico ===
- Alicia Cárdeñas
- Blanca García
- Carolina Mendoza
- Eloisa Cabada
- Gloria Casales
- Gloria Inzua
- Isabel Nogueira
- María Rodríguez
- Patricia Nava
- Rogelia Romo
- Trinidad Macías
- Yolanda Reynoso

Head coach

=== Peru ===
- Aida Reyna
- Alicia Sánchez
- Ana María Ramírez
- Esperanza Jiménez
- Irma Cordero
- Luisa Fuentes (c)
- Norma Velarde
- Olga Asato
- Teresa Nuñez
- Felicitas Arroyo
- Mercedes Gonzáles

Head coach

- Akira Kato (JAP)

=== Poland ===
- Elżbieta Porzec
- Zofia Szczęśniewska
- Wanda Wiecha
- Barbara Niemczyk
- Krystyna Ostromęcka
- Krystyna Krupa
- Jadwiga Książek
- Józefa Ledwig
- Krystyna Jakubowska
- Lidia Chmielnicka
- Krystyna Czajkowska
- Halina Aszkiełowicz

Head coach

- Benedykt Krysik

=== South Korea ===
- An Gyeong-ja
- Hwang Gyu-ok
- Kim Yeong-Ja
- Kim Oe-sun
- Lee Eun-ok
- Lee Hyang-sim
- Moon Kyung-Sook
- Park Geum-suk
- Seo Hui-suk
- Yang Jin-su
- Kwack Yong-Ja

Head coach

=== Soviet Union ===
- Lyudmila Buldakova
- Lyudmila Mikhailkovskaya
- Tatyana Veinberga
- Vera Lantratova
- Vera Galushka-Duyunova
- Tatyana Sarycheva
- Tatyana Ponyaeva-Tretyakova
- Nina Smoleeva
- Inna Ryskal
- Galina Leontyeva
- Roza Salikhova
- Valentina Kamenek-Vinogradova

Head coach

- Givi Akhvlediani

=== United States ===
- Patti Bright
- Kathryn Ann Heck
- Fanny Hopeau
- Ninja Jorgensen
- Laurie Lewis
- Miki McFadden
- Marilyn McReavy
- Nancy Owen
- Barbara "Bobbie" Perry
- Mary Perry
- Sharon Peterson
- Jane Ward (c)

Head coach

- Harlan Cohen
