= Mexico at the 1964 Summer Olympics =

- IOC code: MEX
- NOC: Mexican Olympic Committee

in Tokyo
- Competitors: 94 (90 men and 4 women) in 15 sports
- Flag bearer: Fidel Negrete
- Medals Ranked 35th: Gold 0 Silver 0 Bronze 1 Total 1

Summer Olympics appearances (overview)
- 1900; 1904–1920; 1924; 1928; 1932; 1936; 1948; 1952; 1956; 1960; 1964; 1968; 1972; 1976; 1980; 1984; 1988; 1992; 1996; 2000; 2004; 2008; 2012; 2016; 2020; 2024; 2028

Mexico competed at the 1964 Summer Olympics in Tokyo, Japan. 94 competitors, 90 men and 4 women, took part in 58 events in 15 sports. As the country hosted the next Olympics in Mexico City, the flag of Mexico was raised at the closing ceremony.

== Medalists ==
=== Bronze ===
- Juan Fabila — Boxing, Men's Bantamweight

== Cycling ==
Nine cyclists represented Mexico in 1964.

Individual road race

- Melesio Soto
- Francisco Coronel
- Heriberto Díaz
- Moises López

Team time trial

- Adolfo Belmonte
- Antonio Duque
- Moises López
- Porfirio Remigio

Sprint

- José Luis Tellez
- José Mercado

1000m time trial

- José Mercado

Tandem

- José Mercado
- José Luis Tellez

Individual pursuit

- Antonio Duque

== Diving ==
Men

Athlete	Event	Preliminary		Final			
Athlete	Event	Points	Rank	Points	Rank	Total	Rank
Álvaro Gaxiola	3 m springboard	85.78	15	Did not advance			
Luis Niño	3 m springboard	87.87	12	Did not advance			
José Robinson	3 m springboard	82.42	19	Did not advance			
Álvaro Gaxiola	10 m platform	87.07	18	Did not advance			
Roberto Madrigal	10 m platform	93.82	5 Q	50.45	3	144.27	4
Luis Niño	10 m platform	91.46	10	Did not advance			

== Modern pentathlon ==
four male pentathletes represented Mexico in 1964.

Individual

- David Bárcena
- Eduardo Florez
- Enrique Padilla
- Enriquez Andrade

Team

- David Bárcena
- Eduardo Florez
- Enrique Padilla
- Enriquez Andrade

== Shooting ==
Five shooters represented Mexico in 1964.

50 m pistol

- Enrique Torres
- Raúl Ibarra

50 m rifle, three positions

- Olegario Vázquez
- Abel Vázquez

50 m rifle, prone

- Jesús Elizondo
- Olegario Vázquez

== Swimming ==
Men

Athlete	Event	Heat		Semifinal		Final	
Athlete	Event	Time	Rank	Time	Rank	Time	Rank
Juan Alanís	200 m butterfly	2:23.9	27	Did not advance			
Juan Alanís	400 m individual medley	5:18.6	25	—N/a		Did not advance	
Gabriel Altamirano	200 m butterfly	2:17.9	19	Did not advance			
Guillermo Dávila	400 m individual medley	5:27.1	27	—N/a		Did not advance	
Guillermo Echevarría	1500 m freestyle	17:35.0	9	—N/a		Did not advance	
Alfredo Guzmán	1500 m freestyle	18:07.4	18	—N/a		Did not advance	
Rafael Hernández	400 m individual medley	5:09.8	15	—N/a		Did not advance	
Salvador Ruiz	100 m freestyle	58.8	55	Did not advance			
Rafael Hernández; Salvador Ruiz; Alfredo Guzmán; Guillermo Echevarría	4 × 100 m freestyle relay	3:58.9	12	—N/a		Did not advance	
Rafael Hernández; Guillermo Echevarría; Alfredo Guzmán; Salvador Ruiz	4 × 200 m freestyle relay	8:50.3	15	—N/a		Did not advance	

Women

Athlete	Event	Heat		Semifinal		Final	
Athlete	Event	Time	Rank	Time	Rank	Time	Rank
Silvia Belmar	100 m butterfly	1:12.1	23	Did not advance			
Silvia Belmar	400 metre medley	6:00.7	20	—N/a		Did not advance	
Olga Belmar	400 metre freestyle	5:14.0	29	—N/a		Did not advance	
María Luisa Souza	400 metre freestyle	5:05.2	20	—N/a		Did not advance	
