= Water polo at the 1967 Pan American Games =

Water polo was contested for men only at the 1967 Pan American Games in Winnipeg, Manitoba, Canada.

== Competing teams ==
Six teams contested the event.

- Brazil
- Canada
- Colombia
- Cuba
- Mexico
- United States

== Medalists ==
Event	Gold	Silver	Bronze
Men's water polo	United States	Brazil; Ivo Carotin; João Gonçalves Filho; Henrique Fillelini; Luiz Eduardo Lima; Cláudio Lima; Pedro Pinciroli Jr. Arnaldo Marsili; Marcos Vargas da Costa; Rodney Bell; Paulo Carotini	Mexico; Carlos Morfín Rolando Chávez Oscar Familiar Virgilio Botella Germán Chávez Luis Guzmán Joaquín González Miguel Barragin Francisco García Ricardo Escalante
