= Peru at the 1968 Summer Olympics =

- IOC code: PER
- NOC: Peruvian Olympic Committee

in Mexico City
- Competitors: 28 in 8 sports
- Medals: Gold 0 Silver 0 Bronze 0 Total 0

Summer Olympics appearances (overview)
- 1900; 1904–1932; 1936; 1948; 1952; 1956; 1960; 1964; 1968; 1972; 1976; 1980; 1984; 1988; 1992; 1996; 2000; 2004; 2008; 2012; 2016; 2020; 2024

Peru competed at the 1968 Summer Olympics in Mexico City, Mexico. 28 competitors, 16 men and 12 women, took part in 21 events in 8 sports.

== Athletics ==
Peru qualified four athletes to the summer olympics.

Track events

Athletes	Events	Heat		Quarterfinal		Semifinal		Final	Rank
Athletes	Events	Result	Rank	Result	Rank	Result	Rank	Result	Rank
Fernando Acevedo	Men's 200 m	21.02	4	20.78	3	20.91	8	did not advance	12
Alfredo Deza	Men's 110 m hurdles	14.38	6	did not advance					

Field events

Athlete	Event	Qualification		Final	
Athlete	Event	Result	Rank	Result	Rank
Fernando Abugattás	High jump	2.03	12	did not advance	
Roberto Abugattás	High jump	2.00	17	did not advance	

== Boxing ==
Athlete	Event	Round of 32	Round of 16	Quarterfinals	Semifinals	Final	
Athlete	Event	Opposition Result	Opposition Result	Opposition Result	Opposition Result	Opposition Result	Rank
Luis Minami	Lightweight	—N/a		Vujin (YUG); L 5–0	did not advance		5
Marcelo Quiñones	Middleweight	Jones (USA); L 5–0	did not advance				16

== Fencing ==
Men's foil

- Enrique Barúa

Pool Four	Pld	BW	BL	GF	GA
Mihai Ţiu (ROU)	5	4	1	22	10
Jean-Claude Magnan (FRA)	5	4	1	24	12
Ahmed El-Hamy El-Husseini (EGY)	5	3	2	19	19
Orlando Ruíz (CUB)	5	2	3	20	21
Enrique Barúa (PER)	5	1	4	11	22
Orlando Nannini (ARG)	5	1	4	11	23

== Rowing ==
Peru qualified the following boat.

Athlete	Event	Heats		Repechage		Quarterfinals		Semifinals		Final	
Athlete	Event	Time	Rank	Time	Rank	Time	Rank	Time	Rank	Time	Rank
Lauro Pacussich; Héctor Menacho; Juan López	Men's coxed pair	8:49.26	6 R	8:25.90	4	did not advance					14

Qualification Legend: FA=Final A (medal); FB=Final B (non-medal); FC=Final C (non-medal); FD=Final D (non-medal); FE=Final E (non-medal); FF=Final F (non-medal); SA/B=Semifinals A/B; SC/D=Semifinals C/D; SE/F=Semifinals E/F; Q=Quarterfinals; R=Repechage

== Shooting ==
Five shooter represented Peru during these Olympics. Gladys Baldwin Lopez was one of the first two women, the other being Eulalia Rolińska who competed for Poland, to compete in Olympic Shooting.

Pistol

Athlete	Event	Final	
Athlete	Event	Score	Rank
Víctor Tantalean	25 m rapid fire pistol	572	41
Antonio Vita	50 metre	533	42

Rifle

Athlete	Event	Final	
Athlete	Event	Score	Rank
Gladys Baldwin López	50 m rifle prone	591	31
Walter Perón	Trap	175	48
Pedro Gianella	Skeet	194	5

== Swimming ==
Three swimmers competed in seven events.

Men

Athlete	Event	Heat		Final	
Athlete	Event	Time	Rank	Time	Rank
Juan Carlos Bello	200 m freestyle	2:01.3	1	did not advance	
Juan Carlos Bello	200 m individual medley	2:17.5	2	2:13.7	4

Women

Athlete	Event	Heat		Semifinal		Final	
Athlete	Event	Time	Rank	Time	Rank	Time	Rank
Rosario de Vivanco	100 m freestyle	1:04.7	5	did not advance			
Rosario de Vivanco	200 m freestyle	2:22.2	5	—N/a		did not advance	
Consuelo Changanaqui	200 m freestyle	2:20.7	4	—N/a		did not advance	
Consuelo Changanaqui	400 m freestyle	5:02.9	4	—N/a		did not advance	
Consuelo Changanaqui	200 m individual medley	2:40.0	3	—N/a		did not advance	
Consuelo Changanaqui	400 m individual medley	5:52.2	4	—N/a		did not advance	

== Volleyball ==
Team Roster
- Olga Asato
- Irma Cordero
- Luisa Fuentes
- Esperanza Jiménez
- Teresa Nuñez
- Ana María Ramírez
- Aida Reyna
- Alicia Sánchez
- Norma Velarde
Results

All times are Mexico Central Zone (UTC−5)

Women's Team Competition

Peru's women's volleyball team made its first appearance at the olympics where it finished fourth.

Pos	Team	Pld	W	L	Pts	SPW	SPL	SPR	SW	SL	SR
1	Soviet Union	7	7	0	21	333	193	1.725	21	3	7.000
2	Japan	7	6	1	18	318	147	2.163	19	4	4.750
3	Poland	7	5	2	15	323	304	1.063	15	12	1.250
4	Peru	7	3	4	9	306	324	0.944	12	15	0.800
5	South Korea	7	3	4	9	276	305	0.905	12	14	0.857
6	Czechoslovakia	7	3	4	9	307	308	0.997	12	15	0.800
7	Mexico	7	1	6	3	215	338	0.636	7	18	0.389
8	United States	7	0	7	0	155	356	0.435	4	21	0.190

1968-10-13; 19:00	Peru	3–2	Mexico
1968-10-13; 19:00	(15–17, 15–5, 10–15, 15–2, 15–7); Report

1968-10-14; 10:00	Peru	3–0	South Korea
1968-10-14; 10:00	(15–13, 15–6, 15–9); Report

1968-10-15; 12:00	Japan	3–0	Peru
1968-10-15; 12:00	(15–3, 15–11, 15–9); Report

1968-10-17; 12:00	Soviet Union	3–0	Peru
1968-10-17; 12:00	(15–4, 15–9, 15–9); Report

1968-10-20; 10:00	Czechoslovakia	3–2	Peru
1968-10-20; 10:00	(7–15, 13–15, 15–9, 15–2, 15–3); Report

1968-10-23; 17:00	Peru	3-1	United States
1968-10-23; 17:00	(15–11, 15–0, 14–16, 15–12); Report

1968-10-25; 10:00	Poland	3–1	Peru
1968-10-25; 10:00	(15–10, 14–16, 15–9, 15–8); Report

== Weightlifting ==
Peru had one athlete.

Athlete	Event	Military Press		Snatch		Clean & Jerk		Total	Rank
Athlete	Event	Result	Rank	Result	Rank	Result	Rank	Total	Rank
Efrain Gusquiza	Men's - 90 kg	142.5	14	120	20	167.5	15	430	15
