= Swimming at the 1968 Summer Olympics – Men's 400 metre freestyle =

Men's 400 metre freestyle at the Games of the XIX Olympiad
- Venue: Alberca Olímpica Francisco Márquez
- Dates: 22 October 1968 (heats); 23 October 1968 (final)
- Competitors: 37 from 20 nations
- Winning time: 4:09.0 OR

Medalists
1st place, gold medalist(s)		Mike Burton	United States
2nd place, silver medalist(s)		Ralph Hutton	Canada
3rd place, bronze medalist(s)		Alain Mosconi	France

The men's 400 metre freestyle event at the 1968 Olympic Games took place between 22 and 23 October. This swimming event used freestyle swimming, which means that the method of the stroke is not regulated (unlike backstroke, breaststroke, and butterfly events). Nearly all swimmers use the front crawl or a variant of that stroke. Because an Olympic-size swimming pool is 50 metres long, this race consisted of eight lengths of the pool.

== Results ==
=== Heats ===
Heat 1

Rank	Athlete	Country	Time	Note
1	John Nelson	United States	4:18.7	
2	Francis Luyce	France	4:30.3	
3	Władysław Wojtakajtis	Poland	4:31.1	
4	Mátyás Borlói	Hungary	4:35.4	
5	Gregorio Fiallo	Cuba	4:41.5	
6	Michael Goodner	Puerto Rico	5:00.2	

Heat 2

Rank	Athlete	Country	Time	Note
1	Graham White	Australia	4:17.0	
2	Semyon Belits-Geyman	Soviet Union	4:22.7	
3	Guillermo Echevarría	Mexico	4:24.0	
4	Julio Arango	Colombia	4:25.8	
5	Alfred Müller	East Germany	4:26.4	
6	Csaba Csatlós	Hungary	4:47.6	
7	Bob Loh	Hong Kong	5:10.1	

Heat 3

Rank	Athlete	Country	Time	Note
1	Mike Burton	United States	4:19.3	
2	Greg Brough	Australia	4:19.6	
3	Jean-François Ravelinghien	France	4:30.7	
4	Werner Krammel	West Germany	4:34.0	
5	Jorge Urreta	Mexico	4:34.3	
6	Ronnie Wong	Hong Kong	5:05.7	

Heat 4

Rank	Athlete	Country	Time	Note
1	Alain Mosconi	France	4:19.0	
2	Greg Rogers	Australia	4:22.7	
3	Akhmed Anarbayev	Soviet Union	4:35.1	
4	Fernando González	Ecuador	4:35.3	
5	Friedrich Jokisch	El Salvador	5:09.2	

Heat 5

Rank	Athlete	Country	Time	Note
1	Ralph Hutton	Canada	4:21.0	
2	Gunnar Larsson	Sweden	4:25.0	
3	Pano Capéronis	Switzerland	4:31.4	
4	Ørjan Madsen	Norway	4:31.8	
5	Sven von Holst	Sweden	4:35.0	
6	Tony Asamali	Philippines	4:47.6	
7	Andrew Loh	Hong Kong	5:03.6	

Heat 6

Rank	Athlete	Country	Time	Note
1	Brent Berk	United States	4:20.2	
2	Hans Faßnacht	West Germany	4:20.7	
3	Juan Alanís	Mexico	4:27.4	
4	Ron Jacks	Canada	4:29.4	
5	Jorge González	Puerto Rico	4:38.1	
6	Rubén Guerrero	El Salvador	4:50.8	

=== Final ===
Rank	Athlete	Country	Time	Notes
1	Mike Burton	United States	4:09.0	OR
2	Ralph Hutton	Canada	4:11.7	
3	Alain Mosconi	France	4:13.3	
4	Greg Brough	Australia	4:15.9	
5	Graham White	Australia	4:16.7	
6	John Nelson	United States	4:17.2	
7	Hans Faßnacht	West Germany	4:18.1	
8	Brent Berk	United States	4:26.0	

Key: OR = Olympic record
