= Alanís (surname) =

Alanis is a Spanish surname. Notable people with the surname include:

- Alma Y. Alanís (born 1980), Mexican electrical engineer and control theorist
- Eduardo Alanís (born 1950), Mexican swimmer
- Joan Martí i Alanis (1928–2009), former Bishop of Urgell
- Juan Alanís (born 1946), Mexican swimmer
- Luis Alanís (born 1990), Mexican footballer
- Oscar Alanís (born 1986), Mexican footballer
- Oswaldo Alanís (born 1989), Mexican footballer
- Roberta Lobeira Alanís (born 1979), Mexican visual artist
