= Široký =

Široký (feminine: Široká) is a Czech and Slovak surname literally meanig "wide".

- Eva Široká (born 1943), Czech volleyball player
- Jilen Siroky, American swimmer
- McKenzie Siroky (born 2005), American swimmer
- Miroslav Široký (1885–1972), Czech footballer
- Tomáš Široký (born 1982), Czech volleyball player
- Viliam Široký, Czechoslovak communist politician
