= Swimming at the 1968 Summer Olympics – Men's 1500 metre freestyle =

Men's 1500 metre freestyle at the Games of the XIX Olympiad
- Venue: Alberca Olímpica Francisco Márquez
- Dates: 25 October 1968 (heats); 26 October 1968 (final)
- Competitors: 21 from 26 nations
- Winning time: 16:38.9 OR

Medalists
1st place, gold medalist(s)		Mike Burton	United States
2nd place, silver medalist(s)		John Kinsella	United States
3rd place, bronze medalist(s)		Greg Brough	Australia

The men's 1500 metre freestyle event at the 1968 Olympic Games took place between 25 and 26 October. This swimming event used freestyle swimming, which means that the method of the stroke is not regulated (unlike backstroke, breaststroke, and butterfly events). Nearly all swimmers use the front crawl or a variant of that stroke. Because an Olympic-size swimming pool is 50 metres long, this race consisted of 30 lengths of the pool.

== Results ==
=== Heats ===
Heat 1

Rank	Athlete	Country	Time	Note
1	Mike Burton	United States	17:27.2	
2	Ralph Hutton	Canada	17:35.9	
3	Hans Faßnacht	West Germany	17:40.2	
4	Julio Arango	Colombia	17:53.9	
5	Vladimir Bure	Soviet Union	18:14.7	

Heat 2

Rank	Athlete	Country	Time	Note
1	John Nelson	United States	17:36.0	
2	Juan Alanís	Mexico	17:37.4	
3	Karl-Rüdiger Mann	East Germany	17:37.6	
4	Antonio Corell	Spain	18:12.7	

Heat 3

Rank	Athlete	Country	Time	Note
1	Greg Brough	Australia	17:17.1	
2	John Kinsella	United States	17:22.7	
3	Gunnar Larsson	Sweden	17:57.0	
4	Jorge Urreta	Mexico	17:57.5	
5	Władysław Wojtakajtis	Poland	18:32.4	
6	Jacques Henrard	Belgium	18:38.2	

Heat 4

Rank	Athlete	Country	Time	Note
1	Graham White	Australia	17:10.1	
2	Guillermo Echevarría	Mexico	17:11.0	
3	Katsuji Ito	Japan	17:50.2	
4	Jean-François Ravelinghien	France	18:11.9	
5	Jorge González	Puerto Rico	19:06.0	
6	Rubén Guerrero	El Salvador	19:36.4	

=== Final ===
Rank	Athlete	Country	Time	Notes
1	Mike Burton	United States	16:38.9	OR
2	John Kinsella	United States	16:57.3	
3	Greg Brough	Australia	17:04.7	
4	Graham White	Australia	17:08.0	
5	Ralph Hutton	Canada	17:15.6	
6	Guillermo Echevarría	Mexico	17:36.4	
7	Juan Alanís	Mexico	17:46.6	
8	John Nelson	United States	18:05.1	

Key: OR = Olympic record
