= Alanis (disambiguation) =

Alanis Morissette (born 1974) is a Canadian-American singer-songwriter, producer and actress.

Alanis may also refer to:

- Alanis (album), the debut album by Alanis Morissette
- Alanís, a municipality in the city of Seville, Spain
- Alanis (film), 2017 Argentine film
- Alanis (surname)
- Alanis Guillen (born 1998), Brazilian actress and model
- Alanis Obomsawin (born 1932), Canadian filmmaker
