= Greg Brough =

Australian swimmer

Personal information
- Full name: Gregory John Brough
- Nickname: "Bruffy"
- National team: Australia
- Born: 26 March 1951 Surfers Paradise, Queensland
- Died: 9 March 2014 (aged 62) Beechmont, Queensland
- Height: 1.87 m (6 ft 2 in)
- Weight: 79 kg (174 lb)

Sport
- Sport: Swimming
- Strokes: Freestyle
Medal record
Men's swimming
Representing Australia
Olympic Games
Bronze medal – third place	1968 Mexico City	1500 m freestyle
Commonwealth Games
Bronze medal – third place	1970 Edinburgh	400 m freestyle

Gregory John Brough (26 March 1951 – 9 March 2014) was an Australian long-distance freestyle swimmer of the 1960s and 1970s, who won a bronze medal in the 1500-metre freestyle at the 1968 Summer Olympics. In Mexico City, Brough finished behind the American world record-holder Mike Burton and his teammate John Kinsella. He also finished fourth in the 400-metre, also won by Burton. At the 1970 Commonwealth Games in Edinburgh, Brough won a bronze in the 400-metre behind fellow Australian Graham White.

He attended The Southport School.

== See also ==
- List of Commonwealth Games medallists in swimming (men)
- List of Olympic medalists in swimming (men)
