= Román Gómez =

Román Gómez may refer to:

- Román Gómez (fencer)
- Román Gómez (footballer)
