= Juan Alanis =

Juan Alanis may refer to:

- Juan Alanís (born 1946), Mexican Olympic swimmer
- Juan Alanis (politician) (born 1978), American politician from California
