= Alejandro Guzmán =

Alejandro Guzmán may refer to:

- Alejandro Guzmán (basketball)
- Alejandro Guzmán (footballer)
- Alejandro Guzmán Brito, Chilean lawyer and historian

== See also ==
- Alejandra Guzmán, Mexican pop and rock singer
