= Hopeau =

Hopeau is a surname. Notable people with the surname include:

- Fanny Hopeau (born 1945), American volleyball player
- Shandon Hopeau (born 1998), American soccer player
