= Carolina Mendoza =

Carolina Mendoza may refer to:

- Carolina Mendoza (diver) (born 1997), Mexican diver
- Carolina Mendoza (volleyball) (born 1946), Mexican volleyball player
