= Carlos Quintanar =

Mexican basketball player (1937–2010)

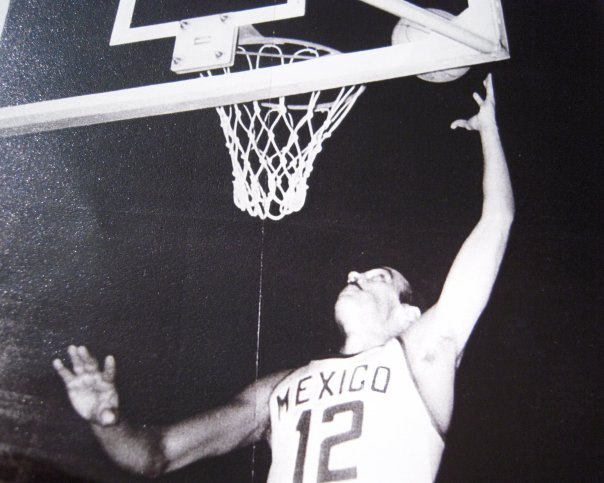
- Quintanar, while representing the Mexico national team.

Personal information
- Born: 2 June 1937 Ciudad Juárez, Mexico
- Died: 14 October 2010 (aged 73) Poza Rica, Mexico
- Listed height: 6 ft 4.5 in (1.94 m)
- Listed weight: 195 lb (88 kg)

Career information
- NBA draft: 1971: 18th round, 234th overall pick
- Drafted by: San Diego Rockets
- Position: Power forward / Center
- Number: 12

Career history
- Ola Verde de Veracruz
- Dorados de Chihuahua Básquetbol

Career highlights
- FIBA World Olympic Qualifying Tournament MVP (1964)
- Stats at Basketball Reference

Carlos Mario Quintanar Rohana (2 June 1937 – 14 October 2010) was a Mexican basketball player and coach from Chihuahua. He was the captain of the Mexico men's national basketball team. Quintanar was nicknamed "Aguja", "Pistolitas", and "The Yokohama Sensation". Along with players like Arturo Guerrero, Manuel Raga, and a few others, Quintanar is generally considered to be one of the best Mexican basketball players of all time.

== Club career ==
Quintanar was the second Mexican basketball player ever to be selected in the NBA Draft by a National Basketball Association team, after his Mexico national team and Olympic teammate Manuel Raga. Quintanar was drafted by the San Diego Rockets, in the 18th round of the 1971 NBA draft, with the 234th overall pick of the draft. At the time he was taken in the draft, his surname was misspelled as Quintar. However, Quintanar never played in the NBA, in order to maintain his amateur status, so that he could represent the Mexico national team in national team competitions, as NBA players were not allowed to compete in them at that time.

== National team career ==
Quintanar represented the Mexico national team in numerous major FIBA tournaments. He played with Mexico in three FIBA Summer Olympics tournaments, as he played at the 1960 Summer Olympics, the 1964 Summer Olympics, and the 1968 Summer Olympics.

Quintanar also represented Mexico at four FIBA World Cup tournaments. He played at the 1959 Chile FIBA World Championship, the 1963 Brazil FIBA World Championship, the 1967 Uruguay FIBA World Championship, and the 1970 Yugoslavia FIBA World Championship. In addition to that, Quintanar also competed with Mexico's national team at in four Pan American Games tournaments. He played at the 1959 Chicago Pan American Games, the 1963 Sāo Paulo Pan American Games, the 1967 Winnipeg Pan American Games, and the Basketball at the 1971 Cali Pan American Games.

With Mexico, Quintanar won the silver medal in the 1967 Pan American Games, which was held at Winnipeg, Manitoba, Canada. In that tournament's final, Mexico lost to Team USA, which was led by players Jo Jo White and Wes Unseld. At an individual level, Quintanar was named the Most Valuable Player of the 1964 Pre-Olympic Tournament, which was held in Yokohama, Japan.

== Coaching career ==
Quintanar was the head coach of the Mexico national team at the 1980 FIBA Tournament of the Americas.
