= Cilindro Municipal =

Indoor arena in Montevideo, Uruguay

- El Cilindro
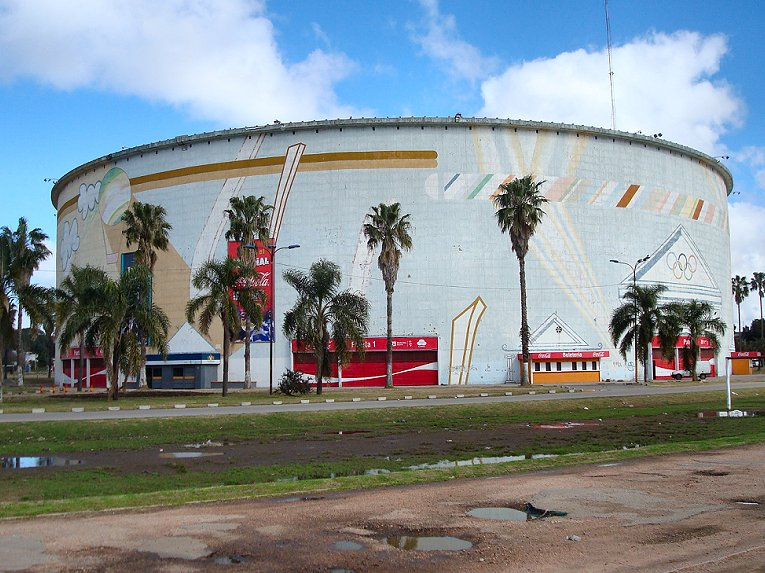
- The exterior of Cilindro Municipal.
- Interactive map of Cilindro Municipal
- Full name: Cilindro Municipal
- Location: Montevideo, Uruguay
- Coordinates: 34°51′48.25″S 56°9′14.01″W
- Capacity: 18,000

Construction
- Opened: 1956
- Closed: 2010
- Demolished: 12 May 2014
- Architect: Lucas Ríos Demaldé
- Structural engineers: Alberto Sydney Miller; Leonel Viera

Cilindro Municipal (The Municipal Cylinder) was an indoor arena in Montevideo, Uruguay, which was opened in 1956, for Uruguay's Industrial Exhibition of the Production of international character. The arena was used as the main venue of the 1967 edition of the FIBA World Cup, for which it had a seating capacity of 18,000 spectators.

== History ==
Over the years, many artists performed at the arena, including Bob Dylan, The Mission, UB40, Van Halen, and Molotov. On October 8, 2001, Eric Clapton performed at the arena, during his Reptile World Tour, and drew a crowd of 18,000 fans.

=== Fire damage and demolishing ===
On 21 October 2010, the Cilindro Municipal's roof fell down atop the inside structure because of a fire, the source of which is unknown. The fire caused severe damage to the arena's seats. The Uruguayan Interior Minister, Eduardo Bonomi, announced that it would be demolished.

A work group started doing construction studies in the middle of December 2010, and in March 2011, the Intendencia of Montevideo announced that the damaged "Cilindro Municipal" would be replaced by a new "Olympic" stadium, with a cultural, as well as sportive scope of use. Work on the new arena was originally expected to start in 2012, and to last for three years. The arena was finally demolished successfully on 12 May 2014, and was eventually replaced by the new Antel Arena which opened in November 2018.

Preceded by Ginásio do Maracanãzinho; Rio de Janeiro	FIBA World Cup; Final Venue; 1967	Succeeded by Dvorana Tivoli; Ljubljana
