= Nurys Sebey =

Cuban volleyball player

Personal information
- Full name: Nurys Sebey Deroncelo
- Born: 3 September 1948 (age 78); Santiago de Cuba, Cuba
- Height: 1.67 m (5 ft 6 in)

Volleyball information
- Number: 8

National team
1966–1972	Cuba
Honours
Women's volleyball
Representing Cuba
Pan American Games
Gold medal – first place	1971 Cali	Team
Bronze medal – third place	1967 Winnipeg	Team
Central American and Caribbean Games
Gold medal – first place	1966 San Juan	Team
Silver medal – second place	1970 Panama City	Team

Nurys Sebey (born 3 September 1948) is a retired Cuban volleyball player. She competed with the Cuban women's national volleyball team at the 1972 Summer Olympics in Munich. Sebey won a bronze medal at the 1967 Pan American Games in Winnipeg and a gold medal at the 1971 Pan American Games in Cali.
