= Brent Berk =

American swimmer (born 1949)

Personal information
- Full name: Brent Thales Berk
- National team: United States
- Born: June 27, 1949 (age 77) Eustis, Florida, U.S.
- Height: 6 ft 0 in (1.83 m)
- Weight: 161 lb (73 kg)

Sport
- Sport: Swimming
- Strokes: Freestyle
- Club: Santa Clara Swim Club
- College team: Stanford University
- Coach: James Gaughran; Stanford

Brent Thales Berk (born June 27, 1949) was an American competition swimmer for Stanford University and a 1968 Mexico City Olympic 400-meter freestyle competitor. He later worked as an insurance executive in Hawaii.

== Early education and swimming ==
Berk was born in Eustis, Florida, and graduated in 1967 from the Punahou School in Honolulu, Hawaii, where he competed for the highly competitive Punahou Swim Club and High School teams. At the Punahou Championships on May 22, 1965, he won the 100-yard free in 51.1, and the 200-yard free in 1:55.1 and was a member of the winning 500-yard free relay. He bettered the 100-yard record bringing it below the 50 second mark swimming unattached as a Senior at Punahou, at the Hawaiian State AAU Indoor Swimming and Diving Championships, where he was clocked at 49.3 seconds. He also won the 500-yard free in a non-record time of 5:13.9. He set a local record for the 200-yard freestyle as well with a time of 1:51.5, while swimming for Punahou School on March 12, 1966.

== 1968 Mexico Olympics ==
In the 1968 U.S. trials, Berk placed second in the 400 free. Having qualified for the team, he represented the United States at the 1968 Summer Olympics in Mexico City, advancing to the event final of the event for which he had qualified, the men's 400-meter freestyle, but finished in eighth place with a time of 4:26.0. Like a number of American swimmers that year, he was ill in Mexico City during the competition, likely a food-born related condition, and it may have affected his performance in the final heat.

He attended Stanford University, where he swam for the Stanford Cardinal swimming and diving team under Head Coach James "Jim" Gaughran in National Collegiate Athletic Association (NCAA) competition and was recognized as an All-American. During his college swimming years, he also swam and trained for Hall of Fame Coach George Haines' outstanding Santa Clara Swim Club. As an outstanding contributor to the Stanford team, in his Sophomore year on February 1, 1969, he helped defeat a strong UCLA team, winning two events and recording a national collegiate best seasonal time of 4:58.7 in the 500 freestyle.

After retiring from his swimming career, Berk settled in Hawai’i where he had grown up, and took up competitive body surfing, competing into his 40s. Remaining in Hawaii, he worked as an insurance executive and was employed in the 1980s by the law firm of Clients and Kerrigan.

He was inducted into the Hawaii Swimming Hall of Fame in 2003.

== See also ==
- List of Punahou School alumni
- List of Stanford University people
