= Alain Mosconi =

French swimmer

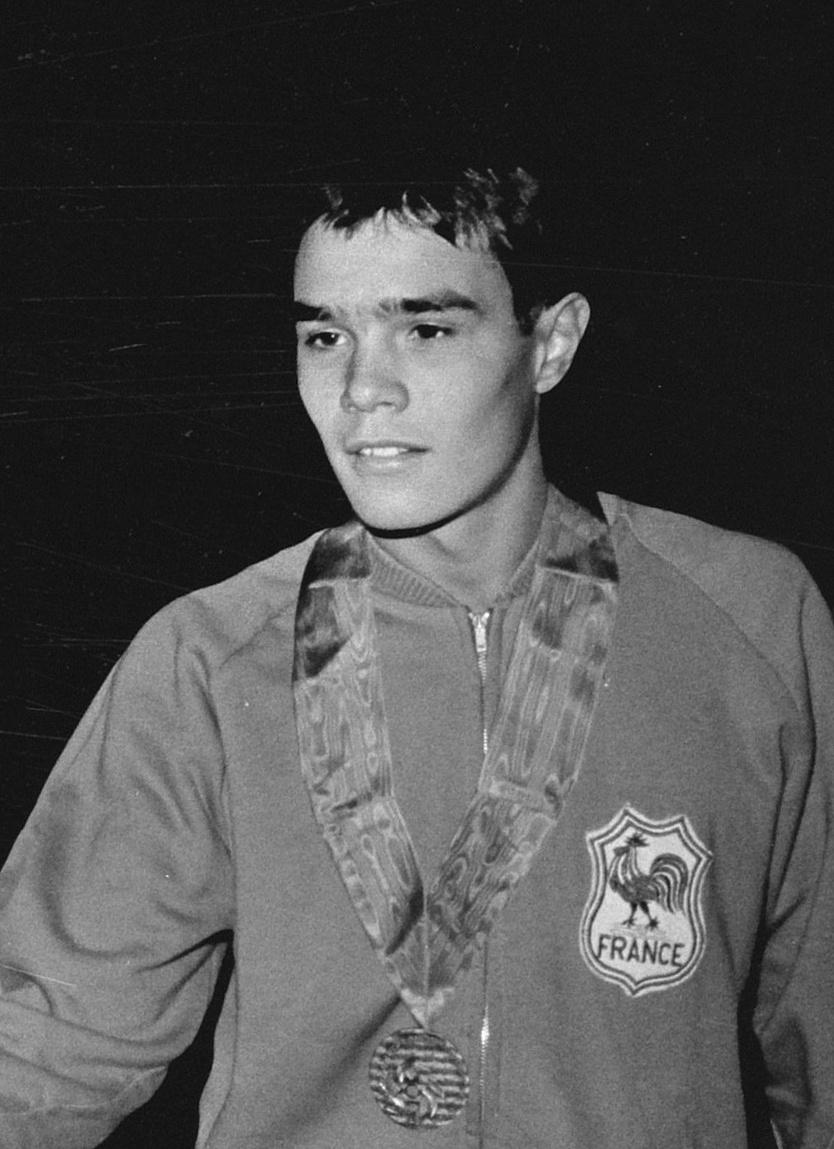
- Alain Mosconi at the 1966 European championships

Personal information
- Born: 9 September 1949 (age 76) Puteaux, France
- Height: 1.81 m (5 ft 11 in)
- Weight: 80 kg (176 lb)

Sport
- Sport: Swimming
- Club: CN Marseille
Medal record
Representing France
Olympic Games
| Bronze medal – third place | 1968 Mexico City | 400 m freestyle |
European Championships
| Silver medal – second place | 1970 Barcelona | 4×100 m medley |
| Bronze medal – third place | 1966 Utrecht | 400 m freestyle |

Alain Mosconi (born 9 September 1949) is a French former swimmer, Olympic medalist and world record holder. He competed at the 1968 and 1972 Summer Olympics in six freestyle, butterfly and medley relay events. In 1968 he won a bronze medal in the 400 m freestyle and finished in fifth place in the 200 m individual freestyle and 4 × 200 m freestyle relay. In 1972, his best achievement was seventh place in the 4 × 100 m freestyle relay.

He won two medals at the European Championships in 1966 and 1970. In 1967 he set world records in the 400 metres freestyle and 800 metres freestyle.

He was president of General Motors, SEAT and Fiat, in France.

== See also ==
- World record progression 400 metres freestyle
- World record progression 800 metres freestyle
