= Nancy Arana-Daniel =

Mexican computer scientist

Nancy Guadalupe Arana–Daniel is a Mexican computer scientist specializing in machine learning approaches including support vector machines and artificial neural networks applied to robot motion planning, computer vision and related problems. Her research has included the development of methods for robots working in disaster response to distinguish human victims from rubble.

== Education and career ==
Arana-Daniel studied computer science at CINVESTAV in Guadalajara, earning a master's degree in 2003 and completing her Ph.D. in 2007. She is a professor and researcher in the Department of Computational Sciences at the University of Guadalajara.

== Recognition ==
Arana-Daniel is a member of the Mexican Academy of Sciences.

== Books ==
Arana-Daniel is the coauthor of books including:

- Bio-inspired Algorithms for Engineering (with Alma Y. Alanís and Carlos López-Franco, Elsevier, 2018)
- Neural Networks for Robotics: An Engineering Perspective (with Alma Y. Alanís and Carlos López-Franco, CRC Press, 2019)
- Neural Networks Modeling and Control: Applications for Unknown Nonlinear Delayed Systems in Discrete Time (with Jorge D. Ríos, Alma Y. Alanís, and Carlos López-Franco, Academic Press, 2020)
