= Olbramkostel =

- Market town
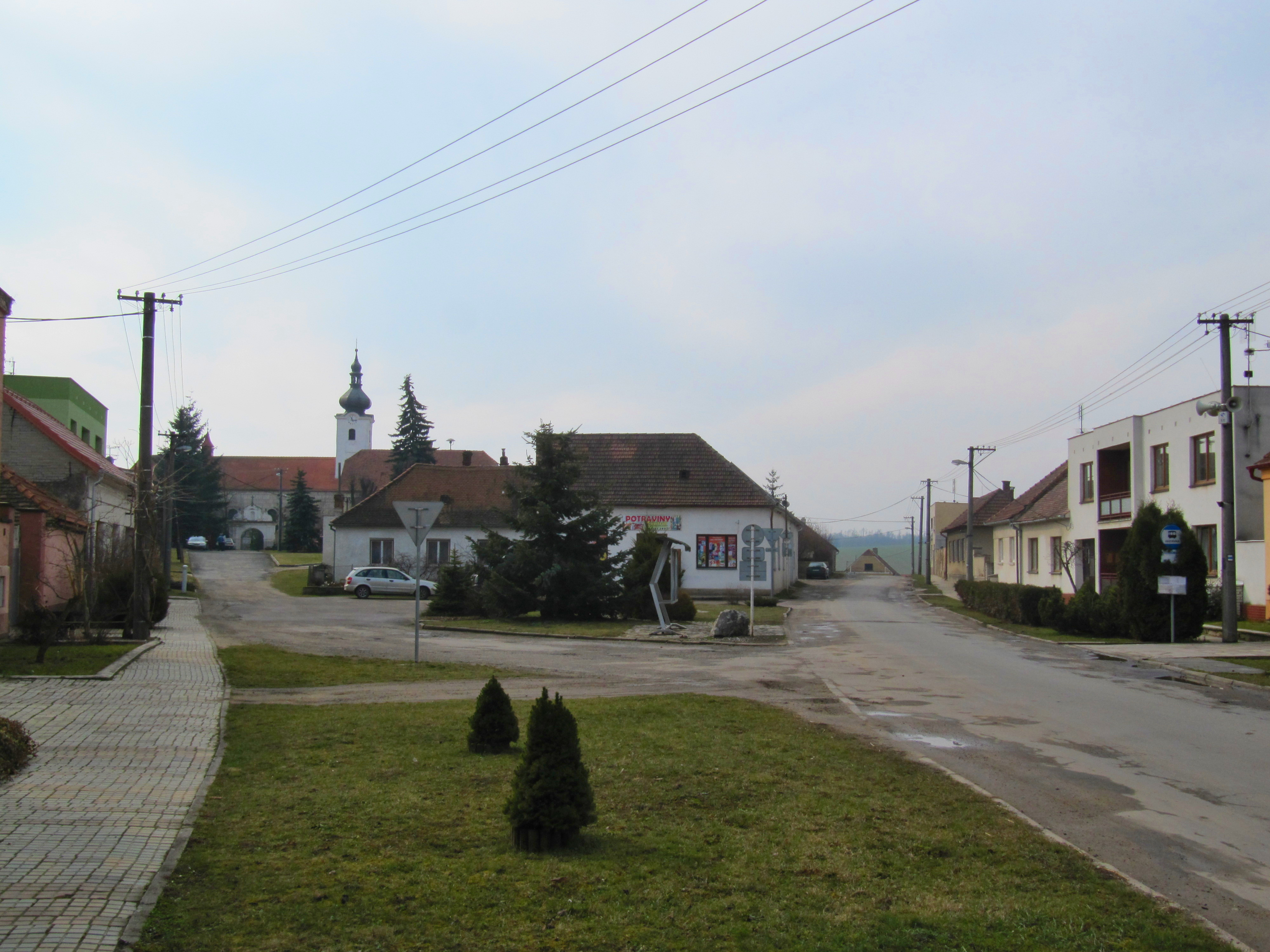
- Centre of Olbramkostel

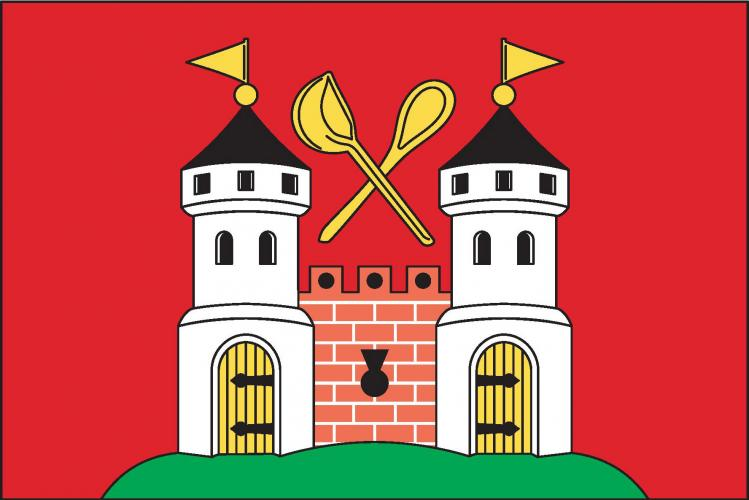
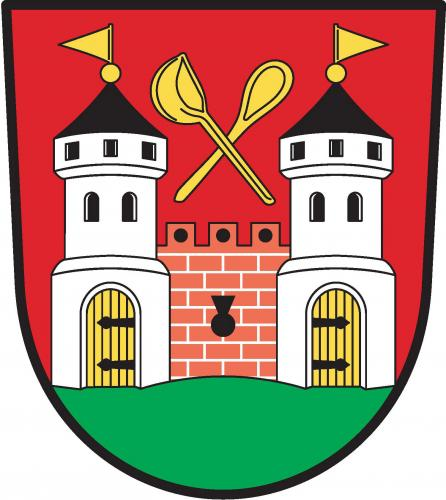
- Flag Coat of arms

- Location in the Czech Republic
- Coordinates: 48°55′18″N 15°56′59″E
- Country: Czech Republic
- Region: South Moravian
- District: Znojmo
- First mentioned: 1293

Area
  - Total: 10.77 km^{2} (4.16 sq mi)
- Elevation: 363 m (1,191 ft)

Population (2026-01-01)
  - Total: 524
  - Density: 48.7/km^{2} (126/sq mi)
- Time zone: UTC+1 (CET)
  - Summer (DST): UTC+2 (CEST)
- Postal code: 671 51
- Website: www.olbramkostel.cz

Olbramkostel (Czech pronunciation: [ˈolbramkostɛl]; German: Wolframitzkirchen) is a market town in Znojmo District in the South Moravian Region of the Czech Republic. It has about 500 inhabitants.

== Geography ==
Olbramkostel is located about 9 kilometres (6 mi) northwest of Znojmo and 55 km (34 mi) southwest of Brno. It lies in the Jevišovice Uplands. The highest point is at 416 m (1,365 ft) above sea level. There are several fishponds around the market town.

== History ==
The first written mention of Olbramkostel is from 1293. There are also earlier mentions from the 13th century, but their credibility and correct dating are uncertain. From 1526, the settlement was a property of the town of Znojmo. In 1538, Olbramkostel was promoted to a market town by Emperor Ferdinand I.

== Demographics ==
Historical population

Year	Pop.	±%
1869	662	—
1880	643	−2.9%
1890	641	−0.3%
1900	686	+7.0%
1910	642	−6.4%

Year	Pop.	±%
1921	621	−3.3%
1930	620	−0.2%
1950	583	−6.0%
1961	608	+4.3%
1970	568	−6.6%

Year	Pop.	±%
1980	500	−12.0%
1991	499	−0.2%
2001	517	+3.6%
2011	504	−2.5%
2021	513	+1.8%

Source: Censuses

== Transport ==
The I/38 road (part of the European route E59) from Jihlava to Znojmo runs through the municipality.

== Sights ==
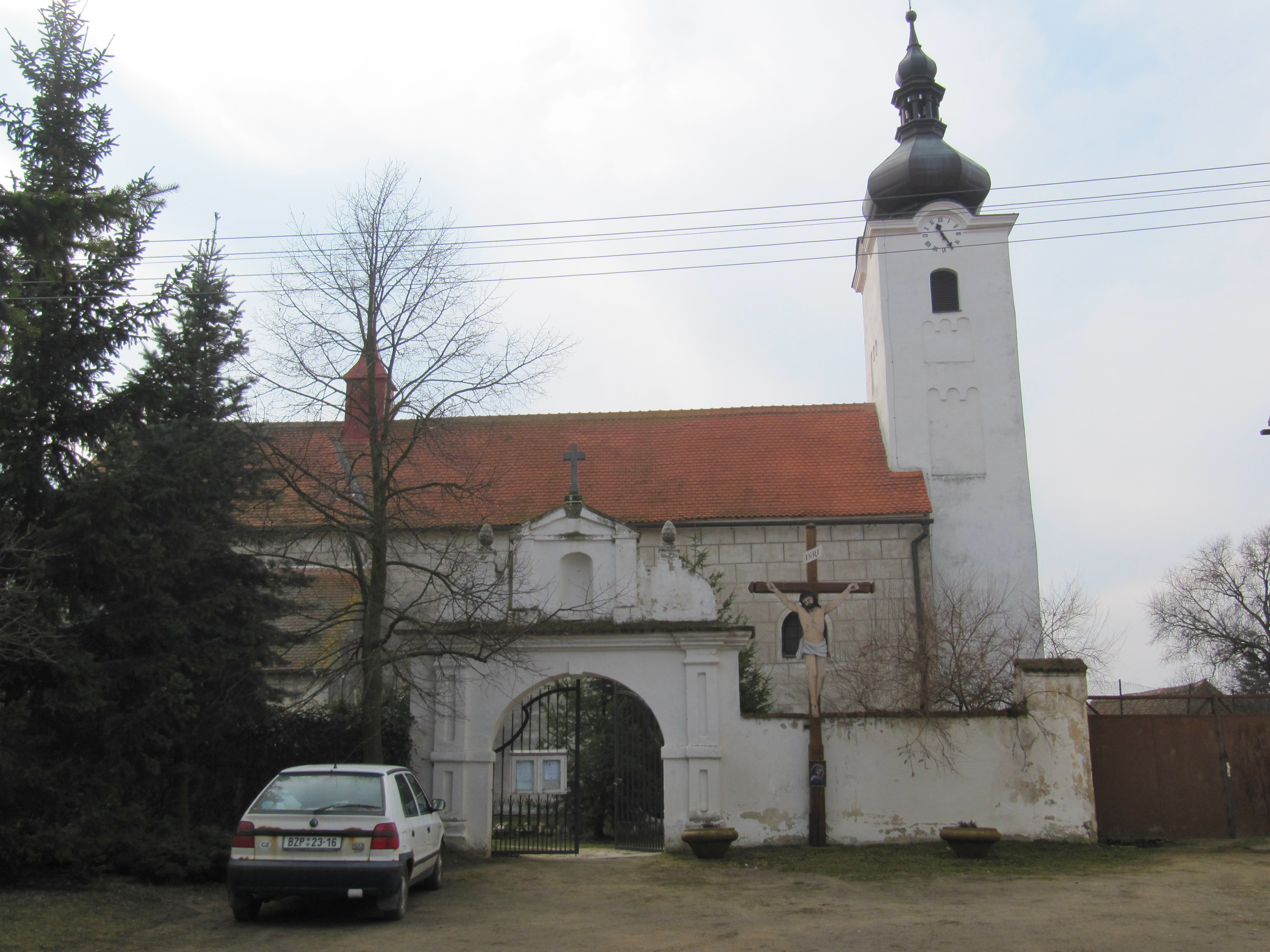
Church of the Assumption of the Virgin Mary

The main landmark of Olbramkostel is the Church of the Assumption of the Virgin Mary. It was built in the Romanesque-Gothic style and later it was modified in the Renaissance and Baroque styles. The Romanesque core has been preserved to this day.

== Notable people ==
- Anna Mifková (born 1943), volleyball player
