= Volleyball at the 1967 Pan American Games =

This page presents the results of the men's and women's volleyball tournament during the 1967 Pan American Games, which was held from July 24 to August 3, 1967 in Winnipeg, Manitoba, Canada.

== Men's indoor tournament ==
=== Final ranking ===
Place	Team
1.	United States
2.	Brazil: Antônio Carlos Moreno; Guy de Faria Mariz; Paulo Sevciuc; Décio Viotti de Azevedo; Victor Barcellos Borges; Carlos Eduardo Albano Feitosa; Gerson Albino Schuch; Marco Antonio Volpi; Arnaldo Jagle; Mário Stiebler Dunlop; Coach: Hélcio Nunan Macedo
3.	Cuba
4.	Mexico
5.	Venezuela
6.	Canada
7.	Argentina
8.	Puerto Rico
9.	Bahamas

1967 Pan American Games winners

United States
Third title

== Women's indoor tournament ==
=== Final ranking ===
Place	Team
1.	United States: Ann Heck; Fanny Hopeau; Ninja Jorgensen; Laurie Lewis; Marilyn McReavy; Linda Murphy; Nancy Owen; Mary Jo Peppler; Sharon Peterson; Bobbie Perry; Mary Perry; Jane Ward; Coach: Harlan Cohen
2.	Peru: Esperanza Jimenez; Alicia Sánchez; Luisa Fuentes; Ana Maria Ramirez; Norma Velarde; Maria Ponce; Margarita Nunez; Irma Cordero; Rita Pizarro; Olga Asato
3.	Cuba: Nelly Barnet; Mercedes Pérez; Evelina Borroto; Nurys Sebey; Zaida Valdes; Mercedes Torriente; Mirna Pena; Aida Lominchar; Benuta Jimenez; Lourdes Hernandez; Sonia Gomez; Marisela Ferreiro
4.	Brazil: Cleide Pereira; Marlene Djinishian; Arlena Figuerova Hunka; Denise Ferraresi; Helenize Henrique de Freitas; Yara Maria Miranda Ribas; Leonesia Cardoso Soares; Nessy Albes; Valmi Volpe; Heliane Lobo Artiaga
5.	Mexico
6.	Canada: Carol Andrus; Andrea R...; Christine Eliashevsky; Maurreen Eishleigh; Margaret Harvey; Helen Hunt; Valerie Hunt; Lois Kennedy; Marjory Shed; Rose Marie Vog.; Justine Williams

1967 Pan American Games winners

United States
First title
