= Ninja Jorgensen =

American volleyball player (1940–2017)

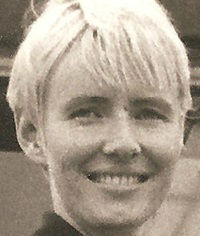

Personal information
- Full name: Ninja Louise Jorgensen
- Nationality: American
- Born: July 6, 1940; Los Angeles, California, U.S.
- Died: October 3, 2017 (aged 77)
- Height: 186 cm (6 ft 1 in)

National team
United States
Medal record
Women's volleyball
Representing the United States
Pan American Games
Gold medal – first place	1967 Winnipeg	Team

Ninja Louise Jorgensen (July 6, 1940 – October 3, 2017) was an American volleyball player. She played for the United States national team at the 1967 Pan American Games and the 1968 Summer Olympics.

== Life ==
She was born in Los Angeles, California. From 1962 to 1998, she was coach at Glendale High School.
