= Hilda Mazúrová =

Slovak volleyball player (born 1943)

Personal information
- Nationality: Slovak
- Born: 17 August 1943 (age 81); Spišské Tomášovce, Czechoslovakia

Sport
- Sport: Volleyball

Hilda Mazúrová (born 17 August 1943) is a Slovak volleyball player. She competed at the 1968 Summer Olympics and the 1972 Summer Olympics.
