= Júlia Bendeová =

Slovak volleyball player (born 1940)

Personal information
- Nationality: Slovak
- Born: 17 February 1940 (age 85); Komárno, Czechoslovakia

Sport
- Sport: Volleyball

Júlia Bendeová (born 17 February 1940) is a Slovak volleyball player. She competed in the women's tournament at the 1968 Summer Olympics.
