= Norma Amezcua =

Mexican swimmer (born 1953)

Personal information
- Born: 14 August 1953 (age 72) Mexico City, Mexico

Sport
- Sport: Swimming
Medal record
Representing Mexico
Pan American Games
Bronze medal – third place	1971 Cali	4x100m medley relay
Central American and Caribbean Games
Gold medal – first place	1970 Panama City	4x100m freestyle relay

Norma Amezcua Guajardo (born 14 August 1953) is a Mexican former butterfly, freestyle and medley swimmer. She competed at the 1968 Summer Olympics and the 1972 Summer Olympics.
