= Anna Mifková =

Czech volleyball player (born 1943)

Personal information
- Nationality: Czech
- Born: 5 June 1943 (age 81); Olbramkostel, Czechoslovakia

Sport
- Country: Czechoslovakia
- Sport: Volleyball

Anna Mifková (born 5 June 1943) is a Czech volleyball player. She competed at the 1968 Summer Olympics and the 1972 Summer Olympics.
