= Mario Santibáñez =

Mexican swimmer (born 1950)

Personal information
- Born: February 1, 1950 (age 76) Mexico City, Mexico

Sport
- Sport: Swimming
Medal record
Representing Mexico
Central American and Caribbean Games
Gold medal – first place	1970 Panama City	4x100m medley relay

Mario Santibáñez (born 1 February 1950) is a Mexican swimmer who competed in the 1968 Summer Olympics.
