= Rafael Cal =

Mexican swimmer (born 1949)

Personal information
- Born: December 12, 1949 (age 76) Mexico City, Mexico

Sport
- Sport: Swimming
Medal record
Representing Mexico
Central American and Caribbean Games
| Gold medal – first place | 1970 Panama City | 4x100m medley relay |

Rafael Cal y Mayor (born 12 November 1949) is a Mexican swimmer who competed in the 1968 Summer Olympics.
