= Gustavo Chapela =

Mexican fencer (born 1946)

Personal information
- Born: 8 September 1946 (age 79) Mexico City, Mexico

Sport
- Sport: Fencing

Gustavo Chapela (born 8 September 1946) is a Mexican fencer. He competed in the individual and team sabre and team foil events at the 1968 Summer Olympics.
