= Alma Y. Alanís =

Mexican control theorist

Alma Yolanda Alanís García
- Born: 1980 (age 45–46); Durango, Mexico
- Education: Durango Institute of Technology; CINVESTAV (Guadalajara)
- Known for: Intelligent control, Artificial neural networks, Robotics
- Notable work: Discrete-Time High Order Neural Control; Neural Networks for Robotics
- Awards: Member of the Mexican Academy of Sciences (2017)
- Scientific career
- Fields: Electrical engineering, Control theory
- Institutions: University of Guadalajara
- Doctoral advisor: Edgar N. Sanchez, Alexander G. Loukianov

Alma Yolanda Alanís García (born 1980) is a Mexican electrical engineer and control theorist specializing in intelligent control, and in particular in the use of artificial neural networks for applications including the control of electric motors, robot manipulators, and unmanned aerial vehicles. She is a chair professor and researcher in the Department of Computational Sciences at the University of Guadalajara.

== Education and career ==
Alanís was born in Durango in 1980, and earned an electrical engineering degree from the Durango Institute of Technology in 2002. She did her graduate study in electrical engineering at the Guadalajara unit of CINVESTAV, earning a master's degree in 2004 and completing her doctorate in 2007. Her dissertation, Discrete-time Neural Control: Application to Induction Motors, was jointly supervised by Edgar N. Sanchez and Alexander G. Loukianov.

She took her present position at the University of Guadalajara in 2008.

== Books ==
Alanís is the coauthor of books including:

- Discrete-Time High Order Neural Control: Trained with Kalman Filtering (with Edgar N. Sanchez and Alexander G. Loukianov, Springer Studies in Computational Intelligence 112, 2008)
- Decentralized Neural Control: Application to Robotics (with Ramon García-Hernández, Michel López-Franco, Edgar N. Sanchez, and José A. Ruz-Hernández, Springer Studies in Systems, Decision and Control 96, 2017)
- Discrete-Time Neural Observers: Analysis and Applications (with Edgar N. Sanchez, Academic Press, 2017)
- Bio-inspired Algorithms for Engineering (with Nancy Arana-Daniel and Carlos López-Franco, Elsevier, 2018)
- Neural Networks for Robotics: An Engineering Perspective (with Nancy Arana-Daniel and Carlos López-Franco, CRC Press, 2019)
- Neural Networks Modeling and Control: Applications for Unknown Nonlinear Delayed Systems in Discrete Time (with Jorge D. Ríos, Nancy Arana-Daniel, Carlos López-Franco, Academic Press, 2020)

She is also co-editor of:

- Artificial Neural Networks for Engineering Applications (with Nancy Arana-Daniel and Carlos López-Franco, Elsevier, 2019)

== Recognition ==
Alanis is a member of the Mexican Academy of Sciences, elected in 2017.
