= Carlos Morfín =

Mexican water polo player (born 1949)

Personal information
- Full name: Carlos Morfín Nuñez
- Born: 28 May 1949 (age 77) Mexico City, Mexico

Sport
- Sport: Water polo
Medal record
Representing Mexico
Pan American Games
Bronze medal – third place	1967 Winnipeg	Men's tournament

Carlos Morfín (born 28 May 1949) is a Mexican water polo player. He competed in the men's tournament at the 1968 Summer Olympics. He was also a member of the bronze medal-winning team at the 1967 Pan American Games.
