= José González (Mexican sport shooter) =

Mexican sport shooter

Personal information
- Born: 13 August 1948 (age 77) Mexico City, Mexico

Sport
- Sport: Sports shooting

José González (born 13 August 1948) is a Mexican former sports shooter. He competed in two events at the 1968 Summer Olympics.
