= Moisés López (cyclist) =

Mexican cyclist

Moises López
Personal information
- Born: 29 June 1940 (age 86)

Cycling career
- Sport: Cycling

Moises López (born 29 June 1940) is a former Mexican cyclist. He competed in the individual road race and team time trial events at the 1964 Summer Olympics.
