= Sharon Peterson =

American volleyball player (born 1942)

Personal information
- Full name: Sharon Roberta Peterson
- Born: November 27, 1942 (age 83); Inglewood, California, U.S.
- Height: 169 cm (5 ft 7 in)
Medal record
Women's volleyball
Representing the United States
Pan American Games
Gold medal – first place	1967 Winnipeg	Team

Sharon Roberta Peterson (born November 27, 1942) is an American former volleyball player. She played for the United States national team at the 1964 Summer Olympics, the 1967 Pan American Games, and the 1968 Summer Olympics. She was born in Inglewood, California.
