= Patricia Obregón (swimmer) =

Mexican swimmer

Personal information
- Born: 30 September 1950 (age 75) Matamoros, Tamaulipas, Mexico

Sport
- Sport: Swimming

Patricia Obregón (born 30 September 1950) is a Mexican former butterfly swimmer. She competed in two events at the 1968 Summer Olympics.
