= Tomáš Široký =

Czech volleyball player (born 1982)

Tomas Siroky
Personal information
- Nationality: Czech
- Born: 26 October 1982 (age 44)
- Height: 196 cm (6 ft 5 in)
- Weight: 100 kg (220 lb)
- Spike: 348 cm (137 in)
- Block: 325 cm (128 in)

Volleyball information
- Number: 16 (national team)

Career
- Years: Team
- 2014-2015: VK Ostrava

National team
- Years: Team
- 2014-2015: Czech Republic

Tomas Siroky (born 26 October 1982) is a former Czech male volleyball player. He was part of the Czech Republic men's national volleyball team. On club level he played for VK Ostrava.
