= Mike Burton (swimmer) =

American swimmer (1947–2026)

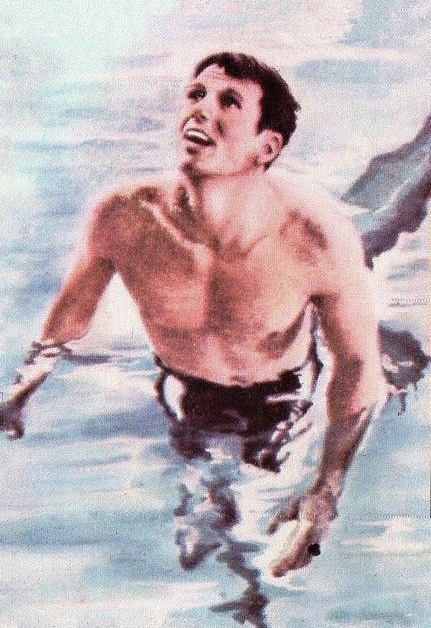
- Burton in a 1968 illustration

Personal information
- Full name: Michael Jay Burton
- Nickname: "Iron Mike"
- National team: United States
- Born: July 3, 1947 Des Moines, Iowa, U.S.
- Died: September 18, 2026 (aged 79)
- Occupation: Swim Coach
- Height: 5 ft 9 in (1.75 m)
- Weight: 154 lb (70 kg)

Sport
- Sport: Swimming
- Strokes: Freestyle
- Club: Arden Hills Swim Club
- College team: University of California, Los Angeles
- Coach: Sherm Chavoor (Arden Hills); Bob Horn (UCLA)
Medal record
Representing the United States
Olympic Games
Gold medal – first place	1968 Mexico City	400 m freestyle
Gold medal – first place	1968 Mexico City	1500 m freestyle
Gold medal – first place	1972 Munich	1500 m freestyle
Pan American Games
Gold medal – first place	1967 Winnipeg	1500 m freestyle
Bronze medal – third place	1967 Winnipeg	400 m freestyle
Bronze medal – third place	1967 Winnipeg	200 m butterfly
Summer Universiade
Bronze medal – third place	1965 Budapest	1500 m freestyle
Gold medal – first place	1967 Tokyo	1500 m freestyle
Silver medal – second place	1967 Tokyo	400 m freestyle

Michael Jay Burton (July 3, 1947 – September 18, 2026) was an American swimmer who competed for the University of California at Los Angeles, a three-time Olympic champion, and a onetime world record-holder in two freestyle distance events. He would later have a career as a swimming coach.

== Early life ==
In eighth grade, Burton was hit by a furniture truck while riding a bicycle with a friend. He had formerly loved to play football and basketball, but the injuries he sustained from his accident made him abandon contact sports, and left swimming as one of his few fitness options.

Burton graduated from El Camino High School. Benefitting from his highly competitive club coaching at Arden Hills, Burton won 10 AAU titles while at El Camino.

=== University of California at Los Angeles ===
Burton attended the University of California at Los Angeles where he swam for Hall of Fame Coach Bob Horn. He won individual NCAA titles five times during his swimming years at UCLA from 1967-1970.

During his collegiate years, his AAU titles included the 500 Free (1970), 1650 Free (1967, 1968, 1970), and 200 Fly (1970), and he was named an All-American for winning these events.

In conference play, he was a four-time Pac-10 champion at UCLA, and helped lead the Bruins to the Pac-10 Championship Team Title in 1970. He entered the UCLA Athletics Hall of Fame as a Charter Member. At the 1967 University Games in Tokyo, Japan, he won a gold medal in the 1,500-meter freestyle, ahead of Russian Semyon Belits-Geiman.

== Olympics ==
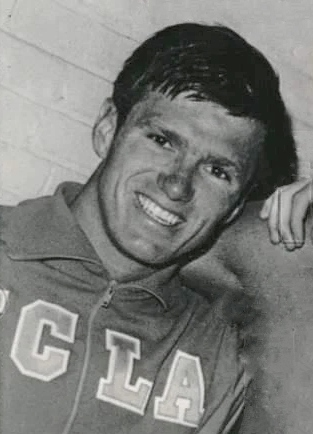
Burton in 1968

Burton won two gold medals in individual events at the 1968 Summer Olympics in Mexico City: the 400-meter freestyle where he swam a 4:09.0 and the 1,500-meter freestyle where he swam a 16:38.9. Despite having been sick in Mexico City, Burton won the 400-meter in a close race against Ralph Hutton of Canada. He won the 1,500-meter, finishing 18 seconds ahead of second-place American John Kinsella.

Four years later at the 1972 Summer Olympics in Munich, Germany, he became the first American to repeat as the 1,500-meter freestyle gold medalist, and recaptured the world record. Burton's repeat proved a stunning win: in the spring of 1972, he had been diagnosed with a vitamin deficiency, and at the U.S. Olympic Trials had barely made the Olympic Team. At the 1972 trials in Chicago, Burton failed to make the Olympic team in the 400 freestyle event and the 200 butterfly, finishing eighth. On the next to the last day of the Trials, he entered the finals of the 1500 where he finished third, qualifying for the U.S. team.

At the 1500-meter event at the Munich Games, Burton started fast and was the early leader over Australian star Graham Windeatt, though Windeatt recovered and regained the lead. Burton overtook Windeatt in the closing lengths, touched first, broke Rick DeMont's standing world record and won the gold medal for the U.S. team.

The celebration in Munich of his historic repeat, however, was overshadowed by Mark Spitz's performance at those Games and by the terrorist attack on the Olympic Village, which occurred the day after Burton's race.

== Coaching ==
In one of his earlier positions, he coached the Des Moines Aquatics Club in his hometown around 1979-81, where one of his swimmers was 1988 Seoul 4x200 gold medalist Craig Oppel. He coached at The Evergreen Swim Team in Olympia, Washington through 1997, and then at the Seahawks in Billings, Montana, at the local YMCA until 2007.

His daughter Loni embarked on her own successful swimming career. She is one of two swimmers in NCAA history to win twelve individual titles. She performed the feat in three years as Division II swimmers are eligible to participate in four individual events versus three in Division I and III.

== Death ==
Burton died on September 18, 2026, at the age of 79.

== Honors ==
Burton was inducted into the International Swimming Hall of Fame as an "Honor Swimmer" in 1977. In 1984, as a five-time NCAA individual champion, he was inducted into the UCLA Hall of Fame. He is a member of the Sacramento Sports Hall of Fame.

== See also ==
- List of multiple Olympic gold medalists
- List of multiple Olympic gold medalists in one event
- List of Olympic medalists in swimming (men)
- List of University of California, Los Angeles people
- World record progression 800 metres freestyle
- World record progression 1500 metres freestyle

Records
Preceded by Stephen Krause; Guillermo Echevarria; Rick DeMont	Men's 1,500-meter freestyle world record-holder August 21, 1966 – July 7, 1968; September 3, 1968 – August 23, 1970; September 4, 1972 – August 5, 1973	Succeeded by Guillermo Echevarria; John Kinsella; Stephen Holland
