= Antonio Duque =

Mexican cyclist (born 1939)

Personal information
- Full name: Antonio Duque Gárza
- Nickname: El Tubo
- Born: 13 November 1939 (age 86)
- Height: 175 cm (5 ft 9 in)
- Weight: 72 kg (159 lb)

Cycling career
- Sport: Cycling
- Discipline: Cyclist

Antonio Duque (born 13 November 1939) is a retired Mexican cyclist. He competed in the team time trial and the individual pursuit events at the 1964 Summer Olympics.
