= 1967 FIBA World Championship =

1967 edition of the FIBA World Championship

FIBA Campeonato Mundial de Baloncesto de 1967

Tournament details
- Host country: Uruguay
- Dates: 27 May – 11 June
- Officially opened by: Óscar Diego Gestido
- Teams: 13 (from 3 confederations)
- Venues: 5 (in 4 host cities)

Final positions
- Champions: Soviet Union (1st title)
- Runners-up: Yugoslavia
- Third place: Brazil
- Fourth place: United States

Tournament statistics
- Games played: 54
- MVP: (Socialist Federal Republic of Yugoslavia) Ivo Daneu
- Top scorer: (Poland) Mieczysław Łopatka (19.7 points per game)

The 1967 FIBA World Championship was the 5th FIBA World Championship, the international basketball world championship for men's national teams. It was hosted by Montevideo, Uruguay from 27 May to 11 June 1967.

== Venues ==
Group	City	Arena	Capacity
Group A	Mercedes	Gimnasio de Praga	–
Group B	Montevideo	Peñarol Palace	10,000
Group C	Salto	Gimnasio de Salto	–
Classification round	Córdoba	Córdoba Sport Club	–
Final round	Montevideo	Cilindro Municipal	18,000

== Competing nations ==
Group A	Group B	Group C
Italy; Mexico; Yugoslavia; United States	Argentina; Japan; Peru; Soviet Union	Brazil; Paraguay; Poland; Puerto Rico
Uruguay – advanced automatically to the final round as host

== Competition format ==
- Preliminary round: Three groups of four teams play each other once; top two teams progress to the final round, bottom two teams relegated to classification round.
- Classification round: All bottom two teams from preliminary round group play each other once. The team with the best record is ranked eighth; the worst is ranked 13th.
- Final round: All top two teams from preliminary round group, the 1964 Olympic champion, and the host team play each other once. The team with the best record wins the championship.

== Preliminary round ==
=== Group A ===
Pos	Team	Pld	W	L	PF	PA	PD	Pts	Qualification
1	United States	3	3	0	218	192	+26	6	Final round
2	Yugoslavia	3	2	1	228	211	+17	5	Final round
3	Mexico	3	1	2	216	221	−5	4	Classification round
4	Italy	3	0	3	178	216	−38	3	Classification round

Source: FIBA archive
Rules for classification: 1) points; 2) head-to-head points; 3) head-to-head goal average; 4) head-to-head number of points scored.

27 May

Mexico	73–86	Yugoslavia
Scoring by half: 34-43, 39-43

Gimnasio de Praga, Mercedes

27 May

United States	67–56	Italy
Scoring by half: 28-30, 39-26

Gimnasio de Praga, Mercedes

28 May

United States	75–65	Mexico
Scoring by half: 42-34, 33-31

Gimnasio de Praga, Mercedes

28 May

Italy	62–71	Yugoslavia
Scoring by half: 30-31, 32-40

Gimnasio de Praga, Mercedes

29 May

Italy	60–78	Mexico
Scoring by half: 27-33, 33-45

Gimnasio de Praga, Mercedes

30 May

United States	76–71	Yugoslavia
Scoring by half: 34-38, 42-33

Gimnasio de Praga, Mercedes

=== Group B ===
Pos	Team	Pld	W	L	PF	PA	PD	Pts	Qualification
1	Soviet Union	3	3	0	284	168	+116	6	Final round
2	Argentina	3	2	1	208	233	−25	5	Final round
3	Peru	3	1	2	192	215	−23	4	Classification round
4	Japan	3	0	3	177	245	−68	3	Classification round

Source: FIBA archive
Rules for classification: 1) points; 2) head-to-head points; 3) head-to-head goal average; 4) head-to-head number of points scored.

27 May

Argentina	69–63	Japan
Scoring by half: 34-34, 35-29

Peñarol Palace, Montevideo

27 May

Soviet Union	84–46	Peru
Scoring by half: 46-17, 38-29

Peñarol Palace, Montevideo

28 May

Peru	65–73	Argentina
Scoring by half: 40-40, 25-33

Peñarol Palace, Montevideo

28 May

Soviet Union	95–56	Japan
Scoring by half: 49-26, 46-30

Peñarol Palace, Montevideo

30 May

Peru	81–58	Japan
Scoring by half: 37-18, 44-40

Peñarol Palace, Montevideo

30 May

Soviet Union	105–66	Argentina
Scoring by half: 53-37, 52-29

Peñarol Palace, Montevideo

=== Group C ===
Pos	Team	Pld	W	L	PF	PA	PD	Pts	Qualification
1	Brazil	3	3	0	260	164	+96	6	Final round
2	Poland	3	2	1	244	207	+37	5	Final round
3	Puerto Rico	3	1	2	206	220	−14	4	Classification round
4	Paraguay	3	0	3	153	272	−119	3	Classification round

Source: FIBA archive
Rules for classification: 1) points; 2) head-to-head points; 3) head-to-head goal average; 4) head-to-head number of points scored.

27 May

Brazil	85–41	Paraguay
Scoring by half: 45-17, 40-24

Gimnasio de Salto, Salto

28 May

Poland	76–64	Puerto Rico
Scoring by half: 35-29, 41-35

Gimnasio de Salto, Salto

28 May

Paraguay	52–86	Puerto Rico
Scoring by half: 23-37, 29-49

Gimnasio de Salto, Salto

29 May

Brazil	83–67	Poland
Scoring by half: 48-37, 35-30

Gimnasio de Salto, Salto

30 May

Paraguay	60–101	Poland
Scoring by half: 26-57, 34-44

Gimnasio de Salto, Salto

30 May

Brazil	92–56	Puerto Rico
Scoring by half: 48-18, 44-38

Gimnasio de Salto, Salto

== Classification round ==
Pos	Team	Pld	W	L	PF	PA	PD	Pts
8	Mexico	5	5	0	318	265	+53	10
9	Italy	5	4	1	373	298	+75	9
10	Peru	5	3	2	279	281	−2	8
11	Japan	5	2	3	327	344	−17	7
12	Puerto Rico	5	1	4	342	355	−13	6
13	Paraguay	5	0	5	283	379	−96	5

Source: FIBA archive
Rules for classification: 1) points; 2) head-to-head points; 3) head-to-head goal average; 4) head-to-head number of points scored.

3 June

Paraguay	46–65	Mexico
Scoring by half: 26-30, 20-35

Córdoba Sport Club, Córdoba

3 June

Puerto Rico	52–57	Peru
Scoring by half: 36-19, 16-38

Córdoba Sport Club, Córdoba

4 June

Paraguay	58–91	Italy
Scoring by half: 22-32, 36-59

Córdoba Sport Club, Córdoba

4 June

Mexico	56–44	Peru
Scoring by half: 30-17, 26-27

Córdoba Sport Club, Córdoba

4 June

Puerto Rico	79–86 (2OT)	Japan
Scoring by half: 29-24, 32-37 Overtime: 9-9; 9-16

Córdoba Sport Club, Córdoba

5 June

Puerto Rico	59–65	Mexico
Scoring by half: 32-30, 27-35

Córdoba Sport Club, Córdoba

5 June

Italy	74–57	Japan
Scoring by half: 41-32, 33-25

Córdoba Sport Club, Córdoba

6 June

Paraguay	55–80	Japan
Scoring by half: 26-40, 29-40

Córdoba Sport Club, Córdoba

6 June

Italy	68–46	Peru
Scoring by half: 36-25, 32-21

Córdoba Sport Club, Córdoba

7 June

Japan	54–69	Mexico
Scoring by half: 34-37, 20-32

Córdoba Sport Club, Córdoba

7 June

Puerto Rico	78–69	Paraguay
Scoring by half: 37-34, 41-35

Córdoba Sport Club, Córdoba

8 June

Paraguay	55–65	Peru
Scoring by half: 24-26, 31-39

Córdoba Sport Club, Córdoba

8 June

Puerto Rico	74–78	Italy
Scoring by half: 41-39, 33-39

Córdoba Sport Club, Córdoba

9 June

Japan	50–67	Peru
Scoring by half: 18-31, 32-36

Córdoba Sport Club, Córdoba

9 June

Italy	62–63	Mexico
Scoring by half: 28-30, 34-33

Córdoba Sport Club, Córdoba

== Final round ==
Pos	Team	Pld	W	L	PF	PA	PD	Pts
1	Soviet Union (C)	6	5	1	449	368	+81	11
2	Yugoslavia	6	4	2	451	432	+19	10 (Note: Head-to-head record: Yugoslavia 2–0, Brazil 1–1, United States 0–2)
3	Brazil	6	4	2	465	432	+33	10
4	United States	6	4	2	457	391	+66	10
5	Poland	6	2	4	422	469	−47	8
6	Argentina	6	1	5	399	479	−80	7 (Note: Head-to-head record: Argentina 1–0 Uruguay)
7	Uruguay (H)	6	1	5	347	419	−72	7

Source: FIBA archive
Rules for classification: 1) points; 2) head-to-head points; 3) head-to-head goal average; 4) head-to-head number of points scored.
(C) Champions; (H) Hosts
Notes:

1 June

Brazil	63–45	Uruguay
Scoring by half: 23-14, 40-31

Cilindro Municipal, Montevideo

2 June

United States	76–66	Argentina
Scoring by half: 32-30, 44-36

Cilindro Municipal, Montevideo

2 June

Poland	61–86	Soviet Union
Scoring by half: 29-41, 32-45

Cilindro Municipal, Montevideo

3 June

Brazil	74–78	Soviet Union
Scoring by half: 42-42, 32-36

Cilindro Municipal, Montevideo

3 June

Uruguay	75–79	Argentina
Scoring by half: 29-35, 46-44

Cilindro Municipal, Montevideo

4 June

Poland	78–82	Yugoslavia
Scoring by half: 42-40, 36-42

Cilindro Municipal, Montevideo

4 June

Uruguay	53–88	United States
Scoring by half: 26-36, 27-52

Cilindro Municipal, Montevideo

5 June

Soviet Union	96–61	Argentina
Scoring by half: 51-39, 45-22

Cilindro Municipal, Montevideo

5 June

Brazil	84–87	Yugoslavia
Scoring by half: 47-41, 37-46

Cilindro Municipal, Montevideo

6 June

Brazil	90–85	Poland
Scoring by half: 47-35, 43-50

Cilindro Municipal, Montevideo

6 June

Soviet Union	58–59	United States
Scoring by half: 23-29, 35-30

Cilindro Municipal, Montevideo

7 June

Yugoslavia	93–69	Argentina
Scoring by half: 40-38, 53-31

Cilindro Municipal, Montevideo

7 June

Uruguay	54–60	Soviet Union
Scoring by half: 26-27, 28-33

Cilindro Municipal, Montevideo

8 June

Yugoslavia	73–72	United States
Scoring by half: 33-39, 40-33

Cilindro Municipal, Montevideo

8 June

Argentina	58–65	Poland
Scoring by half: 33-27, 25-38

Cilindro Municipal, Montevideo

9 June

United States	91–61	Poland
Scoring by half: 41-39, 50-22

Cilindro Municipal, Montevideo

9 June

Yugoslavia	57–58	Uruguay
Scoring by half: 29-28, 28-30

Cilindro Municipal, Montevideo

10 June

Argentina	66–74	Brazil
Scoring by half: 30-39, 36-35

Cilindro Municipal, Montevideo

10 June

Uruguay	62–72	Poland
Scoring by half: 31-26, 31-46

Cilindro Municipal, Montevideo

11 June

Yugoslavia	59–71	Soviet Union
Scoring by half: 26-33, 33-38

Cilindro Municipal, Montevideo

11 June

United States	71–80	Brazil
Scoring by half: 29-40, 42-40

Cilindro Municipal, Montevideo

== Awards ==
1967 World Championship winner

Soviet Union
First title

Most Valuable Player
(Socialist Federal Republic of Yugoslavia) Ivo Daneu

== Final standings ==
Rank	Team	Record
1	Soviet Union	8–1
2	Yugoslavia	6–3
3	Brazil	7–2
4	United States	7–2
5	Poland	4–5
6	Argentina	3–6
7	Uruguay	1–5
8	Mexico	6–2
9	Italy	4–4
10	Peru	4–4
11	Japan	2–6
12	Puerto Rico	2–6
13	Paraguay	0–8

== All-Tournament Team ==
- Radivoj Korać (Yugoslavia)
- Ivo Daneu - (MVP) (Yugoslavia)
- Mieczyslaw Lopatka (Poland)
- Modestas Paulauskas (USSR)
- Luiz Cláudio Menon (Brazil)

== Top scorers (ppg) ==
1. Mieczyslaw Lopatka (Poland) 19.7
2. Bohdan Likszo (Poland) 19.3
3. Luiz Cláudio Menon (Brazil) 18.6
4. Ernesto Ghermann (Argentina) 18.3
5. Gianfranco Lombardi (Italy) 17.5
6. Ubiratan Pereira Maciel (Brazil) 15.9
7. Manuel Raga (Mexico) 15.6
8. Radivoj Korać (Yugoslavia) 14.6
9. Arturo Guerrero (Mexico) 14.4
10. Ivo Daneu (Yugoslavia) 14.0
