= Kathryn Heck =

American volleyball player (born 1943)

Personal information
- Full name: Kathryn Ann Heck
- Born: February 24, 1943 (age 83); Oxnard, California, U.S.
- Height: 170 cm (5 ft 7 in)
Medal record
Women's volleyball
Representing the United States
Pan American Games
Gold medal – first place	1967 Winnipeg	Team

Kathryn Ann Heck (born February 24, 1943) is an American former volleyball player. She played for the United States national team at the 1967 Pan American Games and the 1968 Summer Olympics. She was born in Oxnard, California.
