= Barbara Perry (volleyball) =

American volleyball player (born 1945)

Personal information
- Full name: Barbara Beverly Perry
- Nickname: Bobbie
- Born: June 13, 1945 Honolulu, Hawaii, U.S.
- Died: September 19, 2026 (aged 81) Honolulu, Hawaii, U.S.
- Height: 176 cm (5 ft 9 in)
Medal record
Women's volleyball
Representing the United States
Pan American Games
Gold medal – first place	1967 Winnipeg	Team

Barbara Beverly "Bobbie" Perry (June 13, 1945 – September 19, 2026) was an American former volleyball player. She played for the United States national team at the 1967 Pan American Games and the 1968 Summer Olympics. She was born in Honolulu, Hawaii.

Perry died on September 19, 2026 at the age of 81.
