= Mercedes Gonzáles =

Peruvian volleyball player (born 1954)

Personal information
- Full name: Mercedes González La Torre
- Born: 31 October 1954 (age 71); Cajamarca, Peru
- Height: 1.69 m (5 ft 7 in)

Volleyball information
- Position: Outside hitter
- Number: 1

National team
1968–1977	Peru
Honours
Women's volleyball
Representing Peru
Pan American Games
Silver medal – second place	1971 Cali	Team
Silver medal – second place	1975 Mexico	Team
CSV South American Championship
Gold medal – first place	1971 Montevideo
Gold medal – first place	1973 Bucaramanga
Gold medal – first place	1977 Lima

Mercedes Gonzáles (born 31 October 1954), also known as Mercedes González, is a Peruvian former volleyball player. Gonzáles competed in the women's tournament at the 1976 Summer Olympics in Montreal. An effective hitter, she began playing with the Peruvian team at the age of 13. She won silver medals at both the 1971 Pan American Games in Cali and the 1975 Pan American Games in Mexico City.
