= John Kinsella (swimmer) =

American swimmer

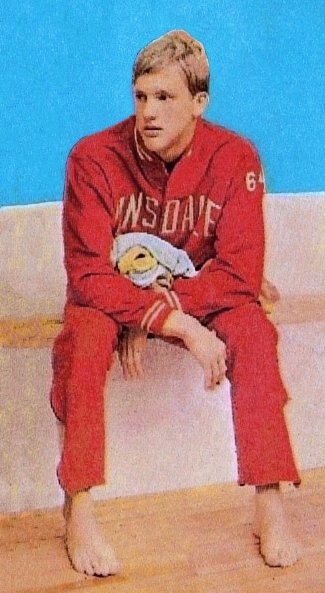
- Kinsella around age 20, in Hinsdale warmup, 1972

Personal information
- Full name: John Pitann Kinsella
- National team: United States
- Born: August 26, 1952 (age 73) Oak Park, Illinois, U.S.
- Height: 6 ft 4 in (1.93 m)
- Weight: 201 lb (91 kg)

Sport
- Sport: Swimming
- Strokes: Freestyle
- Club: Hinsdale Swim Club
- College team: Indiana University
- Coach: Doc Counsilman, (Indiana U); Don Watson (Hinsdale Central)
Medal record
Representing the United States
Olympic Games
Gold medal – first place	1972 Munich	4×200 m relay
Silver medal – second place	1968 Mexico City	1500 m freestyle

John Pitann Kinsella (born August 26, 1952) is an American former competition swimmer for Indiana University, a 1968 Olympic silver, and 1972 Olympic gold medalist, and a former world record-holder in multiple events.

Kinsella was a standout at Illinois swimming powerhouse Hinsdale Central High School in the late 1960s. From 1967 to 1970 greater Chicago's Hindale Central, often aided by Kinsella, won the Illinois State Championships by significant margins. In a unique achievement as a High School Senior in 1970, he became the first person to swim 1,500 meters in under 16 minutes.

== Indiana University ==
After graduating from high school, Kinsella, together with Mark Spitz, Gary Hall Sr., and other notable swimmers, were part of Doc Counsilman's legendary Indiana Hoosiers swimming and diving team at Indiana University, which dominated men's college swimming in the early 1970s. At Indiana, Kinsella lettered with the swimming team each year from 1971 through 1974 and served as Indiana's co-captain in 1974. In the early 1970s, Kinsella helped lead Indiana to four Big Ten and three NCAA national team championships. As a freestyler, with a total of 16 titles, he captured 11 Big Ten individual championships and five relay championships, and placed first in six NCAA individual championships as well as two relay championships.

As a career milestone, he was the American record holder in both the 500 and 1,650 freestyles.

Kinsella won NCAA national championships in the 500-yard and 1,650-yard freestyle events in 1971, 1972, and 1973.

== 1968, 1972 Olympic medalist ==
As a 16-year-old high school swimmer, Kinsella was the silver medalist in the men's 1,500-meter freestyle at the 1968 Summer Olympics in Mexico City, finishing second to U.S. teammate Mike Burton.

At the 1972 Summer Olympics in Munich, Germany, Kinsella won a gold medal as a member of the winning U.S. team in the men's 4×200-meter freestyle relay. The first-place team of Kinsella, Fred Tyler, Steve Genter, and Mark Spitz set a new world-record time of 7:35.78 in the event final. John Murphy, a fellow 1972 Olympic Gold medalist, also swam for both Hinsdale Central High School, and Indiana University with Kinsella.

After graduating from Indiana University, Kinsella went on to swim professionally, setting a time record for swimming the English Channel.

== Honors ==
In 1970, while still a high school senior swimming for Hinsdale Central High School and the Hinsdale McDonald's Swim Club under coach Don Watson, he was awarded the Amateur Athletic Union's James E. Sullivan Award in recognition of the outstanding American amateur athlete of the year. The exclusive honor is not frequently awarded to High School age athletes.

He was inducted into the International Swimming Hall of Fame in 1986 as an "Honor Swimmer" in recognition of his Olympic performances and professional swimming career where he achieved the title of "World's Professional Champion."

After the end of his competitive swimming career, Kinsella attended Harvard Business School. He joined RBC Dain Rauscher as an investment officer, but is no longer with the firm. He currently resides in Illinois. He has a daughter and three sons.

== See also ==
- List of Indiana University (Bloomington) people
- List of Olympic medalists in swimming (men)
- World record progression 400 metres freestyle
- World record progression 1500 metres freestyle
- World record progression 4 × 200 metres freestyle relay

Records
Preceded by Hans-Joachim Fassnacht	Men's 400-meter freestyle world record-holder (long course); August 20, 1970 – September 7, 1970	Succeeded by Gunnar Larsson
Preceded by Mike Burton	Men's 1,500-meter freestyle world record-holder (long course); August 23, 1970 – August 6, 1972	Succeeded by Rick DeMont
