= Laurie Lewis (volleyball) =

American volleyball player (born 1949)

Personal information
- Full name: Laurie Ann Lewis
- Born: December 20, 1949 (age 76); Palo Alto, California, U.S.
- Height: 175 cm (5 ft 9 in)

National team
United States
Medal record
Women's volleyball
Representing the United States
Pan American Games
Gold medal – first place	1967 Winnipeg	Team

Laurie Ann Lewis (born December 20, 1949) is an American former volleyball player. She played for the United States national team at the 1968 Summer Olympics. She also played for UCLA and helped the team win the 1971–72 national championship.

Laurie Ann Lewis is now Laurie Lewis Havel. She was honored as one of the greatest 25 women's volleyball players in the history of UCLA women's volleyball in 1997.
