= Arturo Guerrero =

Mexican basketball player and coach

Personal information
- Born: August 30, 1948 (age 78) León, Guanajuato, Mexico
- Listed height: 6 ft 4 in (1.93 m)
- Listed weight: 185 lb (84 kg)

Career information
- Playing career: 1966–1982
- Position: Small forward

Career history

Playing
- Lechugueros de León
- E.C. Sírio

Coaching
- 1990–1994, 2009–2013: Mexico

Career highlights
- As a player: FIBA Intercontinental Cup Finals Top Scorer (1973); Best Player in Latin America (1971); 2× CIMEBA champion (1971, 1973); Best Mexican Player (1971)
Medals
Representing Mexico
Men's basketball
Pan American Games
Silver medal – second place	1967 Winnipeg
Head coach for Mexico
Silver medal – second place	1991 Havana

Arturo Guerrero Moreno (born 30 August 1948) is a Mexican former basketball player and coach. He represented the Mexico national team and played in two Summer Olympic Games (1968 and 1976). Due to his shooting ability, he was nicknamed "Mano Santa" ("Holy Hand"). Along with Carlos Quintanar, Manolo Raga, and a few other players, he is generally considered to be one of the best Mexican basketball players of all time.

== Club career ==
Guerrero played club basketball in Mexico, Italy, with the Brazilian club E.C. Sírio, in Puerto Rico, and in Cuba. With E.C. Sírio, he played in the 1973 FIBA Intercontinental Cup's final, and was the top scorer. With Lechugueros de León, he won two Mexican Basketball Circuit (CIMEBA) championships, in 1971 and 1973.

During his club career, the NBA's Los Angeles Lakers, Cleveland Cavaliers, and San Antonio Spurs, offered him contracts. However, he turned them down because NBA players were not allowed to play in FIBA competitions at that time, and he would not have been able to continue to represent the Mexico national team.

== National team career ==
Guerrero was a member of the senior men's Mexican national basketball teams that competed at the following major FIBA tournaments: the 1967 FIBA World Cup, the 1968 Summer Olympics, the 1972 Pre-Olympic Tournament, the 1974 FIBA World Cup, the 1976 Pre-Olympic Tournament, and the 1976 Summer Olympics.

With Mexico, Guerrero also won the silver medal at the 1967 Pan American Games, and played at the 1980 FIBA AmeriCup and the 1981 FIBA CentroBasket.

== Coaching career ==
After he ended his playing career, Guerrero became a basketball coach. He was the head coach of the senior men's Mexican national basketball team at the 1991 Pan American Games, the 1992 FIBA AmeriCup, and the 2009 FIBA AmeriCup.
