= Manuel Raga =

Mexican basketball player (born 1944)

Manolo Raga
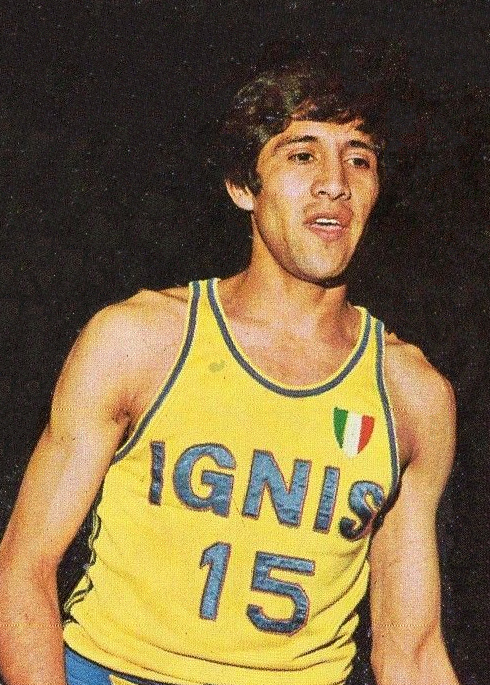
- Raga with Ignis Varese in 1971

Personal information
- Born: March 14, 1944 (age 82) Aldama, Tamaulipas, Mexico
- Listed height: 6 ft 2 in (1.88 m)
- Listed weight: 170 lb (77 kg)

Career information
- NBA draft: 1970: 10th round, 167th overall pick
- Drafted by: Atlanta Hawks
- Playing career: 1963–1979
- Position: Shooting guard
- Number: 15

Career history
- 1963–1968: Villa Aldama
- 1968–1974: Ignis Varese
- 1974–1979: Federale Lugano

Career highlights
- 2× FIBA Intercontinental Cup champion (1970, 1973); 3× EuroLeague champion (1970, 1972, 1973); 50 Greatest EuroLeague Contributors (2008); 3× Italian League champion (1969–1971); 3× Italian Cup winner (1969–1971); 3× Swiss League champion (1975–1977); Swiss Cup winner (1975); Best Mexican Player of the 20th Century (2000)
- Stats at Basketball Reference
- FIBA Hall of Fame

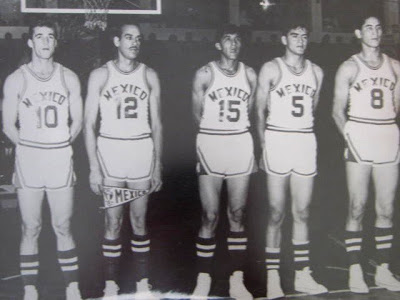
The national quintet of Mexico: Captain Carlos Quintanar (#12), Manuel Raga (#15), and Arturo Guerrero (#5) at the 1968 Summer Olympics.

Manuel "Manolo" Raga Navarro (born March 14, 1944) is a Mexican former professional basketball player. During his playing career, he was nicknamed, "The Flying Mexican", due to his nationality and his one of a kind 43-inch standing (no step) vertical leap. He was named the Best Mexican Player of the 20th Century in 2000. In 2008, he was named one of the 50 Greatest EuroLeague Contributors. In 2016, he became a FIBA Hall of Fame player. Along with players like Carlos Quintanar, Arturo Guerrero, and a few others, Raga is generally considered to be one of the best Mexican basketball players of all time.

== Club career ==
Raga played professionally for Varese in the Italian League, from 1968 to 1974, and with them, he won three EuroLeague championships. In 1970, he became the first player from an international league to be selected in the NBA draft, when Atlanta Hawks general manager, Marty Blake, took him with the 167th overall pick. He also would be the only true international selection from the American Basketball Association when the Pittsburgh Condors took him as their final selection ever in the franchise's history during the 18th round before going defunct later in 1972. However, Raga never played either in the NBA or the rivaling ABA.

== National team career ==
Raga was a part of the senior national team of Mexico. He won a gold medal at the 1965 CentroBasket, and a silver medal at the 1967 Pan American Games. He also played with Mexico in three different Summer Olympic Games, at the 1964 Summer Olympics, the 1968 Summer Olympics, and the 1976 Summer Olympics. He also played in 3 different FIBA World Cups, at Brazil 1963, at Uruguay 1967, and at Puerto Rico 1974.

== Personal life ==
Raga's son, Manuel Raga Jr., was also a professional basketball player. He played college basketball in the United States, with the Cal Poly Mustangs. Manuel Jr. also played professionally in the EuroLeague, with the Lugano Snakes, which was the successor club of SP Federale Lugano, which his father, Manuel Sr., had also previously played with.

== Awards and accomplishments ==
=== Club career ===
- Italian League Champion (3): 1969, 1970, 1971
- Italian Cup Winner (3): 1969, 1970, 1971
- FIBA European Champions Cup (EuroLeague) Champion (3): 1969–70, 1971–72, 1972–73
- FIBA Intercontinental Cup Champion (2): 1970, 1973
- Swiss League Champion (3): 1974–75, 1975–76, 1976–77
- Swiss Cup Winner: 1974–75
- Best Mexican Player of the 20th Century: 2000
- 50 Greatest EuroLeague Contributors: 2008
- FIBA Hall of Fame: 2016
