= Lidia Ramírez =

Mexican swimmer

Personal information
- Born: 27 July 1948 (age 77) Mexico City, Mexico

Sport
- Sport: Swimming

Lidia Ramírez (born 27 July 1948) is a Mexican former swimmer. She competed in four events at the 1968 Summer Olympics.
