= Věra Hrabáková =

Czech volleyball player (born 1941)

Personal information
- Nationality: Czech
- Born: 27 April 1941 (age 83); Prague, Czechoslovakia

Sport
- Sport: Volleyball

Věra Hrabáková (born 27 April 1941) is a Czech volleyball player. She competed in the women's tournament at the 1968 Summer Olympics.
