= Věra Štruncová =

Czech volleyball player (born 1946)

Personal information
- Nationality: Czech
- Born: 1 March 1946 (age 79); Plzeň, Czechoslovakia

Sport
- Sport: Volleyball

Věra Štruncová (born 1 March 1946) is a Czech volleyball player. She competed in the women's tournament at the 1968 Summer Olympics.
