= Raúl Villagómez =

Mexican swimmer

Personal information
- Born: 8 March 1950 (age 76) Mexico City, Mexico

Sport
- Sport: Swimming

Raúl Villagómez (born 8 March 1950) is a Mexican former swimmer. He competed in two events at the 1968 Summer Olympics.
