= Ana Elena de la Portilla =

Mexican swimmer (born 1954)

Personal information
- Born: 6 August 1954 (age 71) Mexico City, Mexico

Sport
- Sport: Swimming

Ana Elena de la Portilla (born 6 August 1954) is a Mexican former breaststroke swimmer. She competed at the 1968 Summer Olympics and the 1972 Summer Olympics.
