= Lee Eun-ok =

South Korean volleyball player (born 1947)

Personal information
- Nationality: South Korean
- Born: 25 October 1947 (age 77); Seoul, South Korea

Sport
- Sport: Volleyball

Lee Eun-ok (born 25 October 1947) is a South Korean volleyball player. She competed in the women's tournament at the 1968 Summer Olympics.
