= Alicia Sánchez =

Peruvian volleyball player

Personal information
- Full name: Alicia Sánchez Ríos
- Born: 22 June 1948 (age 78); Callao, Peru
- Height: 1.66 m (5 ft 5 in)

Volleyball information
- Position: Setter
- Number: 8

National team
1967–1968	Peru
Honours
Women's volleyball
Representing Peru
Pan American Games
Silver medal – second place	1967 Winnipeg	Team

Alicia Sánchez (born 22 June 1948) is a Peruvian former volleyball player. Sánchez competed with the Peruvian women's national volleyball team at the 1968 Summer Olympics in Mexico City. She won a silver medal with the Peruvian team at the 1967 Pan American Games in Winnipeg.
