= Gabriel Altamirano =

Mexican swimmer (born 1946)

Personal information
- Full name: Gabriel Altamirano Tames
- National team: Mexico
- Born: May 24, 1946 (age 80) Mexico City, Mexico
- Height: 172 cm (5 ft 8 in)
Medal record
Men's swimming
Representing Mexico
Central American and Caribbean Games
Gold medal – first place	1962 Kingston	200 m butterfly
Gold medal – first place	1966 San Juan	4 x 100 m medley relay

Gabriel Altamirano Tames (born 24 May 1946 in Mexico City) is a Mexican former swimmer who competed in the 1964 Summer Olympics and in the 1968 Summer Olympics.
