= Francisco García Moreno =

Mexican water polo player (born 1947)

Francisco García Moreno (born 1 June 1947 in Mexico City, died 26 March 2016 in Cuernavaca) was a Mexican Olympic water polo player (1968, 1972, 1976), and a former coach of the national team.

El Panchote, as Garcia Moreno was known, was a member of the bronze medal winning teams at the 1967 and 1971 Pan American Games and a member of the gold medal winning team at the 1975 Pan American Games. Garcia Moreno owned a gym in Cuernavaca where he specialized in teaching babies and children to swim. He promoted water polo among young people in the area. He was murdered during a robbery attempt near his home in Tlatenango, Cuernavaca in 2016. He was always surrounded by other athletes such as Felipe Tibio Muñoz.

== See also ==
- List of people from Morelos
