= Esperanza Jiménez =

Peruvian volleyball player

Personal information
- Full name: Esperanza Jiménez Pérez
- Nickname: Pilancho
- Born: 20 July 1942 (age 84); Lima, Peru
- Height: 1.70 m (5 ft 7 in)

Volleyball information
- Position: Middle blocker
- Number: 2

National team
1959–1975	Peru
Honours
Women's volleyball
Representing Peru
Pan American Games
Silver medal – second place	1967 Winnipeg	Team
Silver medal – second place	1971 Cali	Team
Silver medal – second place	1975 Mexico City	Team
Bronze medal – third place	1959 Chicago	Team
CSV South American Championship
Gold medal – first place	1967 Santos
Gold medal – first place	1971 Montevideo
Gold medal – first place	1973 Bucaramanga
Silver medal – second place	1969 Caracas

Esperanza "Pilancho" Jiménez (born 20 July 1942) is a Peruvian former volleyball player. She competed with the Peruvian women's national volleyball team at the 1968 Summer Olympics in Mexico City, where she finished in fourth place. With the Peruvian team, she won a bronze medal at the 1959 Pan American Games, and silver medals at the 1967, 1971, and 1975 Pan American Games.
