= Rogelia Romo =

Mexican volleyball player (born 1943)

Personal information
- Born: 20 March 1943 (age 82); Guadalajara, Mexico

Sport
- Sport: Volleyball

Rogelia Romo (born 20 March 1943) is a Mexican volleyball player. She competed in the women's tournament at the 1968 Summer Olympics.
