= Yolanda Reynoso =

Mexican volleyball player (born 1946)

Personal information
- Born: 19 July 1946 (age 78); Tepic, Mexico

Sport
- Sport: Volleyball

Yolanda Reynoso (born 19 July 1946) is a Mexican volleyball player. She competed in the women's tournament at the 1968 Summer Olympics.
