= Norma Velarde =

Peruvian volleyball player

Personal information
- Full name: Norma Velarde Álvarez
- Born: 30 December 1946 (age 79); Lima, Peru
- Height: 1.69 m (5 ft 7 in)

Volleyball information
- Position: Outside hitter
- Number: 11

National team
| 1967–1973 | Peru |
Honours
Women's volleyball
Representing Peru
Pan American Games
| Silver medal – second place | 1967 Winnipeg | Team |
| Silver medal – second place | 1971 Cali | Team |

Norma Velarde (born 30 December 1946) is a Peruvian former volleyball player. Velarde competed with the Peruvian women's national volleyball team at the 1968 Summer Olympics in Mexico City, where she finished fourth. She also won silver medals with the Peruvian team at the 1967 Pan American Games in Winnipeg and the 1971 Pan American Games in Cali.
