= Eva Široká =

Czech volleyball player (born 1943)

Personal information
- Nationality: Czech
- Born: 7 November 1943 (age 81); Prague, Czechoslovakia

Sport
- Sport: Volleyball

Eva Široká (born 7 November 1943) is a Czech volleyball player. She competed in the women's tournament at the 1968 Summer Olympics.
