= Salvador Ruiz de Chávez Ochoa =

Mexican swimmer (born 1938)

Personal information
- Full name: Salvador Ruiz de Chávez Ochoa
- Born: 5 December 1938 (age 87) Mexico City, Mexico

Sport
- Sport: Swimming
Medal record
Representing Mexico
Central American and Caribbean Games
Gold medal – first place	1966 San Juan	100m freestyle
Gold medal – first place	1966 San Juan	4x100m medley relay

Salvador Ruiz de Chávez Ochoa (born 5 December 1938) is a Mexican public accountant and academic. He taught at the National Autonomous University of Mexico (UNAM) for 22 years and was the dean of the UNAM's School of Accounting and Administration from 1989 to 1993.

He was a co-founder of the Mexican Association of Accounting and Administration Professors (Asociación de Profesores de Contaduría y Administración de México) and was the association's president in 2005–2006.

As an amateur swimmer, he competed in the 1964 Summer Olympics and the 1968 Summer Olympics.
