= Román Gómez (fencer) =

Mexican fencer (born 1947)

Personal information
- Born: 6 July 1947 (age 78) Mexico City, Mexico

Sport
- Sport: Fencing

Román Gómez (born 6 July 1947) is a Mexican former fencer. He competed in the individual and team foil and team sabre events at the 1968 Summer Olympics.
