= Rolando Chávez =

Mexican water polo player (born 1943)

Personal information
- Born: 23 August 1943 (age 81); Mexico City, Mexico

Sport
- Sport: Water polo

Rolando Chávez (born 23 August 1943) is a Mexican water polo player. He competed in the men's tournament at the 1968 Summer Olympics.
