= Virgilio Botella =

Mexican water polo player (born 1949)

Personal information
- Born: 24 June 1949 (age 75); Mexico City, Mexico

Sport
- Sport: Water polo

Virgilio Botella (born 24 June 1949) is a Mexican water polo player. He competed in the men's tournament at the 1968 Summer Olympics.
