= Gloria Inzua =

Mexican volleyball player (born 1946)

Personal information
- Born: 17 November 1946 (age 78); Tampico, Mexico

Sport
- Sport: Volleyball

Gloria Inzua (born 17 November 1946) is a Mexican volleyball player. She competed in the women's tournament at the 1968 Summer Olympics.
