= Patricia Nava =

Mexican volleyball player (born 1948)

Personal information
- Born: 31 August 1948 (age 76); Guadalajara, Mexico

Sport
- Sport: Volleyball

Patricia Nava (born 31 August 1948) is a Mexican volleyball player. She competed in the women's tournament at the 1968 Summer Olympics.
