= Blanca García =

Mexican volleyball player (born 1947)

Personal information
- Born: 7 April 1947 (age 78); Tepic, Mexico

Sport
- Sport: Volleyball

Blanca García (born 7 April 1947) is a Mexican volleyball player. She competed in the women's tournament at the 1968 Summer Olympics.
