= Fanny Hopeau =

American volleyball player (1945–2019)

Personal information
- Full name: Fanny K. Hopeau
- Born: April 21, 1945; Honolulu, Hawaii, U.S.
- Died: July 27, 2019 (aged 74)
- Height: 175 cm (5 ft 9 in)
Medal record
Women's volleyball
Representing the United States
Pan American Games
Gold medal – first place	1967 Winnipeg	Team

Fanny K. Hopeau (April 21, 1945 – July 27, 2019) was an American volleyball player. She played for the United States national team at the 1967 Pan American Games and the 1968 Summer Olympics. She was born in Honolulu, Hawaii.
