= Ana María Ramírez =

Peruvian volleyball player

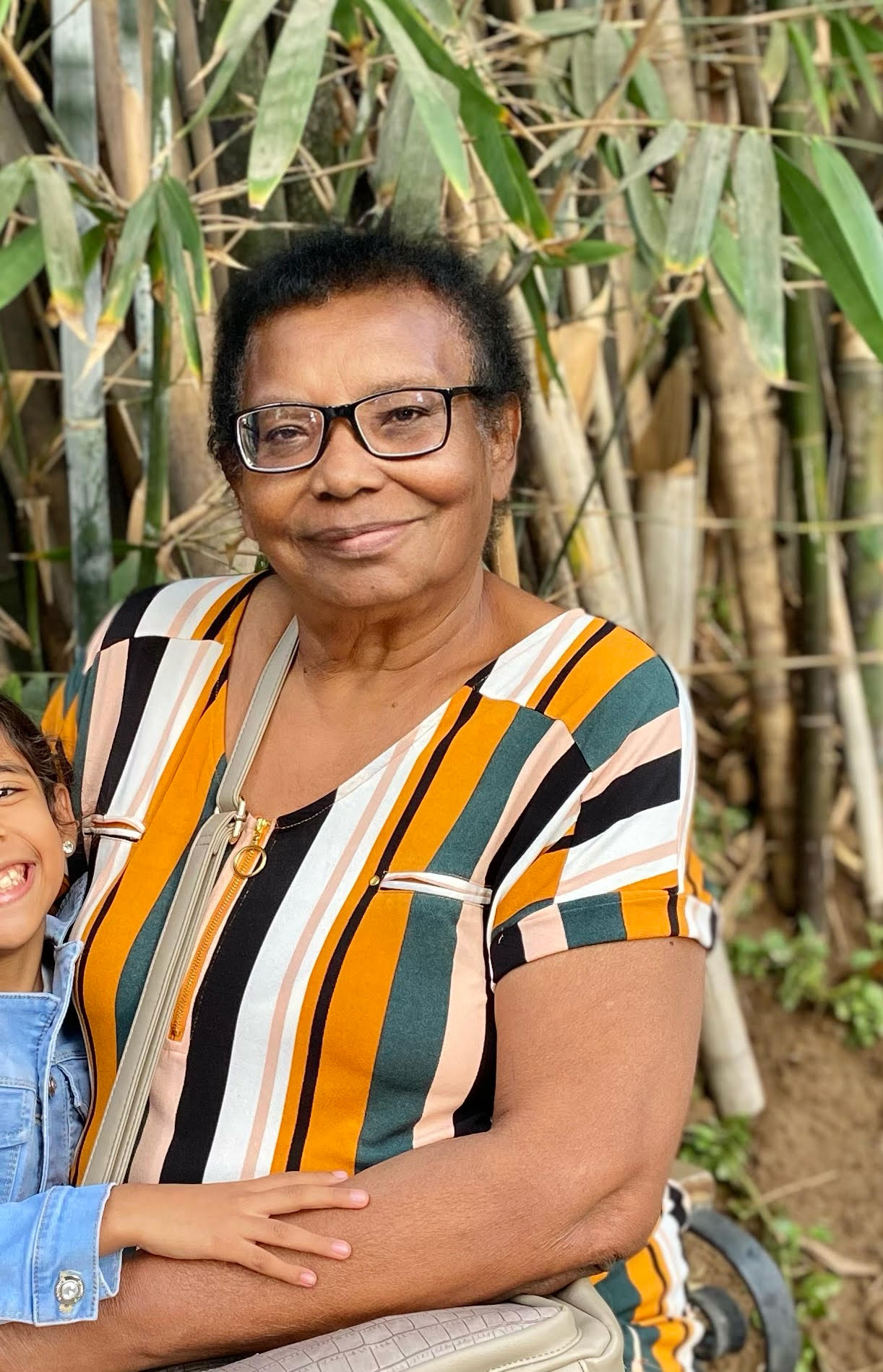

Personal information
- Full name: Ana María Ramírez Toledo
- Born: 28 August 1948 (age 78); Pisco, Peru
- Height: 1.73 m (5 ft 8 in)

Volleyball information
- Position: Middle blocker
- Number: 10

National team
1967–1975	Peru
Honours
Women's volleyball
Representing Peru
Pan American Games
Silver medal – second place	1967 Winnipeg	Team
Silver medal – second place	1971 Cali	Team
Silver medal – second place	1975 Mexico City	Team
CSV South American Championship
Gold medal – first place	1973 Bucaramanga

Ana María Ramírez (born 28 August 1948) is a Peruvian former volleyball player. Ramírez competed with the Peruvian women's national volleyball team at the 1968 Summer Olympics in Mexico City, where she finished in fourth place. She won silver medals with the national team at the 1967 Pan American Games in Winnipeg, the 1971 Pan American Games in Cali, and the 1975 Pan American Games in Mexico City.
