= Olga Asato =

Peruvian volleyball player

Personal information
- Full name: Olga Asato Hichiya
- Born: 31 March 1949 (age 77); Callao, Peru
- Height: 1.66 m (5 ft 5 in)

Volleyball information
- Position: Opposite
- Number: 6

National team
1967–1971	Peru
Honours
Women's volleyball
Representing Peru
Pan American Games
Silver medal – second place	1967 Winnipeg	Team
Silver medal – second place	1971 Cali	Team

Olga Asato (born 31 March 1949) is a Peruvian former volleyball player. Asato competed with the Peruvian women's national volleyball team at the 1968 Summer Olympics in Mexico City. She won silver medals with the Peruvian team at the 1967 Pan American Games in Winnipeg and the 1971 Pan American Games in Cali.
