= Alejandro Guzmán (basketball) =

Mexican basketball player (born 1945)

Alejandro Guzmán (born 8 December 1945) is a Mexican former basketball player who competed in the 1968 Summer Olympics. He was born in Durango City.
