= Eduardo Alanís =

Mexican swimmer (born 1950)

Personal information
- Full name: Eduardo Alanís Guerrero
- Born: 1 May 1950 (age 76) Mexico City, Mexico

Sport
- Sport: Swimming
Medal record
Men's swimming
Representing Mexico
Central American and Caribbean Games
Gold medal – first place	1970 Panama City	4×200 m freestyle

Eduardo Alanís Guerrero (born 1 May 1950 in Mexico City) is a Mexican former swimmer who competed in the 1968 Summer Olympics.
