= Oscar Familiar =

Mexican water polo player (born 1941)

Personal information
- Born: 6 September 1941 (age 83); Mexico City, Mexico

Sport
- Sport: Water polo

Oscar Familiar (born 6 September 1941) is a Mexican water polo player. He competed in the men's tournament at the 1968 Summer Olympics.
