= Isabel Nogueira =

Mexican volleyball player (born 1944)

Personal information
- Born: 28 June 1944 (age 80); Mexico City, Mexico

Sport
- Sport: Volleyball

Isabel Nogueira (born 28 June 1944) is a Mexican volleyball player. She competed in the women's tournament at the 1968 Summer Olympics.
