= Carolina Mendoza (volleyball) =

Mexican volleyball player (born 1946)

Personal information
- Born: 27 May 1946 (age 79); Zacatepec de Hidalgo, Mexico

Sport
- Sport: Volleyball

Carolina Mendoza (born 27 May 1946) is a Mexican volleyball player. She competed in the women's tournament at the 1968 Summer Olympics.
