= Guillermo Echevarría =

Mexican swimmer (1948–2021)

Personal information
- Born: May 13, 1948
- Died: November 24, 2021 (aged 73)

Sport
- Sport: Swimming
Medal record
Representing Mexico
Central American and Caribbean Games
Gold medal – first place	1966 San Juan	200m freestyle
Gold medal – first place	1966 San Juan	400m freestyle
Gold medal – first place	1966 San Juan	1500m freestyle
Gold medal – first place	1966 San Juan	200m backstroke
Gold medal – first place	1966 San Juan	200m butterfly
Gold medal – first place	1966 San Juan	400m individual medley
Gold medal – first place	1966 San Juan	4x200m freestyle relay
Gold medal – first place	1966 San Juan	4x100m medley relay

Guillermo Echevarría Pérez (13 May 1948 – 24 November 2021) was a Mexican swimmer who competed at the 1964 Summer Olympics and the 1968 Summer Olympics.

Echevarría was born on 13 May 1948 in Mexico City. He briefly held the world record in the 1500 meter (long course), breaking Mike Burton's record in 1968, before Burton took the record back two months later.

Echevarría died on 24 November 2021, at the age of 73.

== See also ==
- World record progression 1500 metres freestyle
