= Juan Alanís =

Mexican swimmer (born 1946)

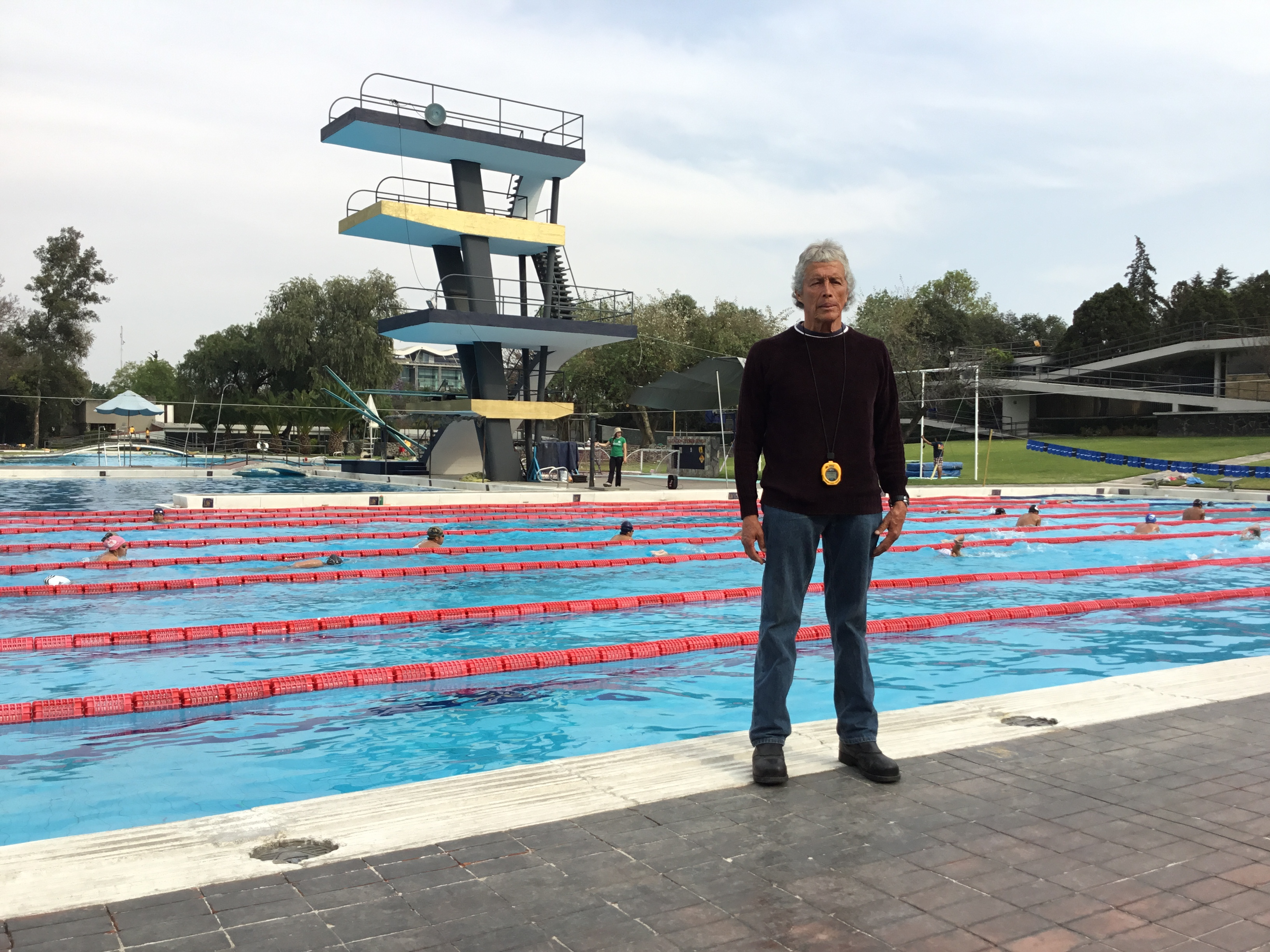

Personal information
- Born: September 20, 1946 (age 79) Mexico City, Mexico

Sport
- Sport: Swimming
Medal record
Representing Mexico
Central American and Caribbean Games
Gold medal – first place	1966 San Juan	4x200m freestyle relay

Juan Alanís Guerrero (born 20 September 1946) is a Mexican former swimmer who competed in the 1964 Summer Olympics and in the 1968 Summer Olympics.
