= Australia at the 1968 Summer Olympics =

- IOC code: AUS
- NOC: Australian Olympic Federation

in Mexico City
- Competitors: 128 (104 men, 24 women) in 16 sports
- Flag bearers: Bill Roycroft (opening); Eric Pearce (closing)
- Medals Ranked 9th: Gold 5 Silver 7 Bronze 5 Total 17

Summer Olympics appearances (overview)
- 1896; 1900; 1904; 1908; 1912; 1920; 1924; 1928; 1932; 1936; 1948; 1952; 1956; 1960; 1964; 1968; 1972; 1976; 1980; 1984; 1988; 1992; 1996; 2000; 2004; 2008; 2012; 2016; 2020; 2024; 2028

Other related appearances
- 1906 Intercalated Games –––– Australasia (1908–1912)

Australia competed at the 1968 Summer Olympics in Mexico City, Mexico. Australian athletes have competed in every Summer Olympic Games. 128 competitors, 104 men and 24 women, took part in 105 events in 16 sports.

The uniforms for Australia's female athletes were designed by Zara Holt, the widow of prime minister Harold Holt who had drowned in December 1967. They consisted of one design in "wattle yellow" for official use and a casual outfit in "Olympic green" crimplene.

== Medalists ==
=== Gold ===
- Ralph Doubell – Athletics, Men's 800m
- Maureen Caird – Athletics, Women's 80m Hurdles
- Lyn McClements – Swimming, Women's 100m Butterfly
- Michael Wenden – Swimming, Men's 100m Freestyle
- Michael Wenden – Swimming, Men's 200m Freestyle

=== Silver ===
- Peter Norman – Athletics, Men's 200m,
- Raelene Boyle – Athletics, Women's 200m
- Pamela Kilborn-Ryan-Nelson – Athletics, Women's 80m Hurdles
- Arthur Busch, Paul Dearing, James Mason, Brian Glencross, Gordon Pearce, Julian Pearce, Robert Haigh, Donald Martin, Raymond Evans, Ronald Riley, Patrick Nilan, Donald Smart, Fred Quine, Eric Pearce and Desmond Piper – Field Hockey, Men's Team Competition
- Alf Duval, Michael Morgan, Joseph Fazio, Peter Dickson, David Douglas, John Ranch, Gary Malcolm Pearce, Robert Alan Shirlaw, and Alan Geoffrey Grover – Rowing, Men's Eight with Coxswain (8+)
- Lynne Watson, Judy Playfair, Lyn McClements, and Janet Steinbeck – Swimming, Women's 4 × 100 m Medley Relay
- Greg Rogers, Graham White, Bob Windle, and Michael Wenden – Swimming, Men's 4 × 200 m Freestyle Relay

=== Bronze ===
- Jennifer Lamy-Frank – Athletics, Women's 200m
- Brian Cobcroft & Depeche, Wayne Roycroft & Zhivago, and Bill Roycroft & Warrathoola – Equestrian, Eventing Team Competition
- Greg Brough – Swimming, Men's 1500m Freestyle
- Karen Lynne Moras – Swimming, Women's 400m Freestyle
- Greg Rogers, Robert Cusack, Bob Windle, and Michael Wenden – Swimming, Men's 4 × 100 m Freestyle Relay

== Athletics ==
Men's 3.000m Steeplechase

- Kerry O'Brien
  - Qualifying Heat — 9:01.49
  - Final — 8:52.08 (→ 4th place)

Men's High Jump

- Lawrie Peckham
  - Qualifying Round — 2.14m
  - Final — 2.12m (→ 8th place)

== Cycling ==
Nine cyclists represented Australia in 1968.

Individual road race

- Ronald Jonker
- Peter McDermott
- Kevin Morgan
- Donald Wilson

Team time trial

- Donald Wilson
- Kevin Morgan
- Peter McDermott
- Dave Watson

Sprint

- Gordon Johnson
- John Nicholson

1000m time trial

- Hilton Clarke

Tandem

- Gordon Johnson
- Hilton Clarke

Individual pursuit

- John Bylsma

== Diving ==
Men

Athlete	Event	Preliminary		Final			
Athlete	Event	Points	Rank	Points	Rank	Total	Rank
Don Wagstaff	3 m springboard	97.84	7 Q	52.34	6	150.18	8
Don Wagstaff	10 m platform	88.99	15	Did not advance			

Women

Athlete	Event	Preliminary		Final			
Athlete	Event	Points	Rank	Points	Rank	Total	Rank
Robyn Bradshaw	3 m springboard	81.66	15	Did not advance			
Robyn Bradshaw	10 m platform	45.58	18	Did not advance			

== Fencing ==
Five fencers, all men, represented Australia in 1968.

Men's foil

- Russell Hobby
- Graeme Jennings
- Bill Ronald

Men's épée

- Russell Hobby
- Bill Ronald
- Graeme Jennings

Men's team épée

- Russell Hobby, Peter Macken, Graeme Jennings, Bill Ronald, Duncan Page

== Modern pentathlon ==
Three male pentathletes represented Australia in 1968.

Men's Individual Competition:

- Peter Macken – 4284 points (31st place)
- Duncan Page – 3904 points (39th place)
- Donald McMikin – 3759 points (42nd place)

Men's Team Competition:

- Macken, Page, and McMikin – 11959 points (12th place)

== Shooting ==
Three shooters, all men, represented Australia in 1968.

Mixed

Athlete	Event	Final	
Athlete	Event	Score	Rank
Barry Downs	50 m pistol	541	35
Alexander Taransky	25 m pistol	583	19
Don Tolhurst	50 m rifle, three positions	1136	28

== Swimming ==
Men

Athlete	Event	Heat		Semifinal		Final	
Athlete	Event	Time	Rank	Time	Rank	Time	Rank
Greg Rogers	100 m freestyle	55.4	=15 Q	54.9	=13	Did not advance	
Mike Wenden	100 m freestyle	53.6	1 Q	52.9 OR	1 Q	52.2 WR	1st place, gold medalist(s)
Bob Windle	100 m freestyle	54.8	=6 Q	54.6	11	Did not advance	
Mark Anderson	200 m freestyle	2:02.2	18	—N/a		Did not advance	
Mike Wenden	200 m freestyle	1:59.3 OR	1 Q	—N/a		1:55.2 OR	1st place, gold medalist(s)
Bob Windle	200 m freestyle	2:01.0	7 Q	—N/a		2:00.9	6
Greg Brough	400 m freestyle	4:19.6	5 Q	—N/a		4:15.9	4
Greg Rogers	400 m freestyle	4:22.7	=9	—N/a		Did not advance	
Graham White	400 m freestyle	4:17.0	1 Q	—N/a		4:16.7	5
Greg Brough	1500 m freestyle	17:17.1	3 Q	—N/a		17:04.7	3rd place, bronze medalist(s)
Graham White	1500 m freestyle	17:10.1	1 Q	—N/a		17:08.0	4
Karl Byrom	100 m backstroke	1:03.2	=14 Q	1:02.3	9	Did not advance	
Karl Byrom	200 m backstroke	2:20.7	=15	—N/a		Did not advance	
Ian O'Brien	100 m breaststroke	1:08.9	=2 Q	1:09.0	=8 Q	1:08.6	6
Ian O'Brien	200 m breaststroke	2:36.8	=13	—N/a		Did not advance	
Robert Cusack	100 m butterfly	59.6	10 Q	59.2	8 Q	59.8	8
Graham Dunn	100 m butterfly	1:01.6	30	Did not advance			
Robert Cusack	200 m butterfly	2:19.4	22	—N/a		Did not advance	
Graham Dunn	200 m butterfly	2:17.5	19	—N/a		Did not advance	
Karl Byrom	200 m individual medley	2:28.0	34	—N/a		Did not advance	
Karl Byrom	400 m individual medley	5:11.9	18	—N/a		Did not advance	
Greg Rogers; Robert Cusack; Bob Windle; Mike Wenden	4 × 100 m freestyle relay	3:38.0	3 Q	—N/a		3:34.7	3rd place, bronze medalist(s)
Greg Rogers; Graham White; Bob Windle; Mike Wenden	4 × 200 m freestyle relay	8:04.8	1 Q	—N/a		7:53.7	2nd place, silver medalist(s)
Karl Byrom; Ian O'Brien; Robert Cusack; Mike Wenden	4 × 100 m medley relay	4:04.8	=5 Q	—N/a		4:00.8	4

Women

Athlete	Event	Heat		Semifinal		Final	
Athlete	Event	Time	Rank	Time	Rank	Time	Rank
Lyn Bell	100 m freestyle	1:01.9	6 Q	1:02.4	=9	Did not advance	
Jenny Steinbeck	100 m freestyle	1:03.8	=21 Q	1:02.6	=11	Did not advance	
Lynne Watson	100 m freestyle	1:03.5	18 Q	1:02.9	17	Did not advance	
Lyn Bell	200 m freestyle	2:15.7	=5 Q	—N/a		2:15.1	7
Julie McDonald	200 m freestyle	2:19.9	16	—N/a		Did not advance	
Jenny Steinbeck	200 m freestyle	2:18.8	13	—N/a		Did not advance	
Christine Deakes	400 m freestyle	5:01.5	19	—N/a		Did not advance	
Denise Langford	400 m freestyle	4:52.2	9	—N/a		Did not advance	
Karen Moras	400 m freestyle	4:39.6	2 Q	—N/a		4:37.0	3rd place, bronze medalist(s)
Christine Deakes	800 m freestyle	10:06.7	9 Q	—N/a		Did not advance	
Denise Langford	800 m freestyle	9:59.3	6 Q	—N/a		9:56.7	7
Karen Moras	800 m freestyle	9:38.3 OR	1 Q	—N/a		9:38.6	4
Dianna Rickard	100 m backstroke	1:12.4	23	Did not advance			
Lynne Watson	100 m backstroke	1:09.4	2 Q	1:09.0	=4 Q	1:09.1	6
Lynne Watson	200 m backstroke	2:33.5	5 Q	—N/a		2:29.5	4
Jo-Anne Barnes	100 m breaststroke	1:19.1	8 Q	1:18.4	9	Did not advance	
Sue McKenzie	100 m breaststroke	1:20.9	=19	Did not advance			
Judy Playfair	100 m breaststroke	1:19.2	9 Q	1:19.3	=13	Did not advance	
Jo-Anne Barnes	200 m breaststroke	2:57.4	19	—N/a		Did not advance	
Sue McKenzie	200 m breaststroke	2:53.1	14	—N/a		Did not advance	
Judy Playfair	200 m breaststroke	2:52.9	13	—N/a		Did not advance	
Pauline Gray	100 m butterfly	1:13.5	22	Did not advance			
Lyn McClements	100 m butterfly	1:06.1	1 Q	1:06.1	=1 Q	1:05.5	1st place, gold medalist(s)
Pauline Gray	200 m butterfly	2:43.6	18	—N/a		Did not advance	
Lyn McClements	200 m butterfly	2:40.7	=13	—N/a		Did not advance	
Sue Eddy	200 m individual medley	2:36.6	11	—N/a		Did not advance	
Dianna Rickard	200 m individual medley	2:36.0	10	—N/a		Did not advance	
Sue Eddy	400 m individual medley	5:42.2	14	—N/a		Did not advance	
Dianna Rickard	400 m individual medley	5:37.8	10	—N/a		Did not advance	
Jenny Steinbeck; Sue Eddy; Lynne Watson; Lyn Bell; Julie McDonald^{[a]}	4 × 100 m freestyle relay	4:12.0	3 Q	—N/a		4:08.7	4
Lynne Watson; Judy Playfair; Lyn McClements; Jenny Steinbeck; Lyn Bell^{[a]}	4 × 100 m medley relay	4:34.6	1 Q	—N/a		4:30.0	2nd place, silver medalist(s)

^{a} Swimmers who participated in the heats only.
