= Swimming at the 1968 Summer Olympics – Women's 100 metre butterfly =

Women's 100 metre butterfly at the Games of the XIX Olympiad
- Venue: Alberca Olímpica Francisco Márquez
- Dates: 20 October 1968 (heats & semifinals); 21 October 1968 (final)
- Competitors: 28 from 21 nations
- Winning time: 1:05.5

Medalists
| 1st place, gold medalist(s) | | Lyn McClements | Australia |
| 2nd place, silver medalist(s) | | Ellie Daniel | United States |
| 3rd place, bronze medalist(s) | | Susan Shields | United States |

The women's 100 metre butterfly event at the 1968 Olympic Games took place between 20 and 21 October. This swimming event used the butterfly stroke. Because an Olympic size swimming pool is 50 metres long, this race consisted of two lengths of the pool.

== Results ==
=== Heats ===
Heat 1

| Rank | Athlete | Country | Time | Note |
|---|---|---|---|---|
| 1 | Heike Hustede-Nagel | West Germany | 1:07.7 | |
| 2 | Ada Kok | Netherlands | 1:08.5 | |
| 3 | Jeanne Warren | Canada | 1:10.0 | |
| 4 | Yasuko Fujii | Japan | 1:10.1 | |
| 5 | Patricia Obregón | Mexico | 1:12.4 | |
| 6 | Nam Sang-nam | South Korea | 1:16.9 | |

Heat 2

| Rank | Athlete | Country | Time | Note |
|---|---|---|---|---|
| 1 | Ellie Daniel | United States | 1:07.2 | |
| 2 | Tatyana Devyatova | Soviet Union | 1:07.6 | |
| 3 | Christine Strübing | East Germany | 1:09.2 | |
| 4 | Nel Bos | Netherlands | 1:09.5 | |
| 5 | Oei Liana | Chinese Taipei | 1:11.2 | |
| 6 | Vivienne Smith | Ireland | 1:13.1 | |
| 7 | Catherine Grosjean | France | 1:14.6 | |

Heat 3

| Rank | Athlete | Country | Time | Note |
|---|---|---|---|---|
| 1 | Lyn McClements | Australia | 1:06.1 | |
| 2 | Andrea Gyarmati | Hungary | 1:07.4 | |
| 3 | Yvonne Tobis | Israel | 1:12.0 | |

Heat 4

| Rank | Athlete | Country | Time | Note |
|---|---|---|---|---|
| 1 | Helga Lindner | East Germany | 1:08.0 | |
| 2 | Toni Hewitt | United States | 1:08.1 | |
| 3 | Margaret Auton | Great Britain | 1:08.5 | |
| 4 | Carmen Gómez | Colombia | 1:14.7 | |
| 5 | Ruth Apt | Uruguay | 1:15.3 | |
| 6 | Ana Marcial | Puerto Rico | 1:17.1 | |

Heat 5

| Rank | Athlete | Country | Time | Note |
|---|---|---|---|---|
| 1 | Susan Shields | United States | 1:06.2 | |
| 2 | Sandra Whittleston | New Zealand | 1:08.5 | |
| 3 | Gillian Treers | Great Britain | 1:10.6 | |
| 4 | Marilyn Corson | Canada | 1:10.7 | |
| 5 | Pauline Gray | Australia | 1:13.5 | |
| 6 | Adriana Comolli | Argentina | 1:16.5 | |

=== Semifinals ===
Heat 1

| Rank | Athlete | Country | Time | Note |
|---|---|---|---|---|
| 1 | Ada Kok | Netherlands | 1:06.2 | |
| 2 | Susan Shields | United States | 1:06.3 | |
| 3 | Andrea Gyarmati | Hungary | 1:06.6 | |
| 4 | Heike Hustede-Nagel | West Germany | 1:07.0 | |
| 5 | Toni Hewitt | United States | 1:07.9 | |
| 6 | Christine Strübing | East Germany | 1:08.2 | |
| 7 | Jeanne Warren | Canada | 1:09.7 | |
| 8 | Gillian Treers | Great Britain | 1:10.6 | |

Heat 2

| Rank | Athlete | Country | Time | Note |
|---|---|---|---|---|
| 1 | Ellie Daniel | United States | 1:06.1 | |
| 2 | Lyn McClements | Australia | 1:06.1 | |
| 3 | Helga Lindner | East Germany | 1:07.7 | |
| 4 | Tatyana Devyatova | Soviet Union | 1:08.4 | |
| 5 | Nel Bos | Netherlands | 1:08.5 | |
| 6 | Sandra Whittleston | New Zealand | 1:08.7 | |
| 7 | Margaret Auton | Great Britain | 1:08.7 | |
| 8 | Yasuko Fujii | Japan | 1:09.4 | |

=== Final ===
| Rank | Athlete | Country | Time | Notes |
|---|---|---|---|---|
| 1 | Lyn McClements | Australia | 1:05.5 | |
| 2 | Ellie Daniel | United States | 1:05.8 | |
| 3 | Susan Shields | United States | 1:06.2 | |
| 4 | Ada Kok | Netherlands | 1:06.2 | |
| 5 | Andrea Gyarmati | Hungary | 1:06.8 | |
| 6 | Heike Hustede-Nagel | West Germany | 1:06.9 | |
| 7 | Toni Hewitt | United States | 1:07.5 | |
| 8 | Helga Lindner | East Germany | 1:07.6 | |
