= Swimming at the 1968 Summer Olympics – Women's 200 metre butterfly =

Women's 200 metre butterfly at the Games of the XIX Olympiad
- Venue: Alberca Olímpica Francisco Márquez
- Dates: 24 October 1968 (heats & final)
- Competitors: 21 from 16 nations
- Winning time: 2:24.7 OR

Medalists
| 1st place, gold medalist(s) | | Ada Kok | Netherlands |
| 2nd place, silver medalist(s) | | Helga Lindner | East Germany |
| 3rd place, bronze medalist(s) | | Ellie Daniel | United States |

The women's 200 metre butterfly event at the 1968 Olympic Games took place 24 October. This swimming event used the butterfly stroke. Because an Olympic size swimming pool is 50 metres long, this race consisted of four lengths of the pool. This was the first time for this event for the women swimmers.

== Results ==
=== Heats ===
Heat 1

| Rank | Athlete | Country | Time | Note |
|---|---|---|---|---|
| 1 | Diane Giebel | United States | 2:33.0 | |
| 2 | Yasuko Fujii | Japan | 2:33.4 | |
| 3 | Margaret Auton | Great Britain | 2:33.6 | |
| 4 | Sandra Whittleston | New Zealand | 2:39.7 | |
| 5 | Carmen Gómez | Colombia | 2:44.7 | |

Heat 2

| Rank | Athlete | Country | Time | Note |
|---|---|---|---|---|
| 1 | Ellie Daniel | United States | 2:29.4 | |
| 2 | Vivienne Smith | Ireland | 2:39.7 | |
| 3 | Jeanne Warren | Canada | 2:40.7 | |
| 4 | Lyn McClements | Australia | 2:40.7 | |
| 5 | Lotten Andersson | Sweden | 2:42.1 | |
| 6 | Lidia Ramírez | Mexico | 2:42.1 | |

Heat 3

| Rank | Athlete | Country | Time | Note |
|---|---|---|---|---|
| 1 | Toni Hewitt | United States | 2:29.1 | |
| 2 | Heike Hustede-Nagel | West Germany | 2:32.1 | |
| 3 | Christine Strübing | East Germany | 2:39.0 | |
| 4 | Nam Sang-nam | South Korea | 2:58.6 | |

Heat 4

| Rank | Athlete | Country | Time | Note |
|---|---|---|---|---|
| 1 | Ada Kok | Netherlands | 2:26.3 | |
| 2 | Helga Lindner | East Germany | 2:29.4 | |
| 3 | Tetiana Dev'iatova | Soviet Union | 2:34.7 | |
| 4 | Marilyn Corson | Canada | 2:41.8 | |
| 5 | Pauline Gray | Australia | 2:43.6 | |
| 6 | Kristina Moir | Puerto Rico | 2:51.1 | |

=== Final ===
| Rank | Athlete | Country | Time | Notes |
|---|---|---|---|---|
| 1 | Ada Kok | Netherlands | 2:24.7 | OR |
| 2 | Helga Lindner | East Germany | 2:24.8 | |
| 3 | Ellie Daniel | United States | 2:25.9 | |
| 4 | Toni Hewitt | United States | 2:26.2 | |
| 5 | Heike Hustede-Nagel | West Germany | 2:27.9 | |
| 6 | Diane Giebel | United States | 2:31.7 | |
| 7 | Margaret Auton | Great Britain | 2:33.2 | |
| 8 | Yasuko Fujii | Japan | 2:34.3 | |

Key: OR = Olympic record
