= Swimming at the 1968 Summer Olympics – Women's 4 × 100 metre medley relay =

Women's 4 × 100 metre medley relay at the Games of the XIX Olympiad
- Venue: Alberca Olímpica Francisco Márquez
- Dates: 17 October 1968 (heats & final)
- Competitors: 70 from 16 nations
- Winning time: 4:28.3 OR

Medalists
1st place, gold medalist(s)		Kaye Hall, Catie Ball, Ellie Daniel, Susan Pedersen, Jane Swagerty*, Suzy Jones*, Susan Shields*, Jan Henne*	United States
2nd place, silver medalist(s)		Lynne Watson, Judy Playfair, Lyn McClements, Jenny Steinbeck, Lyn Bell*	Australia
3rd place, bronze medalist(s)		Angelika Kraus, Uta Frommater, Heike Hustede-Nagel, Heidi Reineck *Swimmers who played in the heats only. Under 1968 Olympic rules, they did not receive a medal.	West Germany

The women's 4 × 100 metre medley relay event at the 1968 Olympic Games took place on 17 October. This swimming event uses medley swimming as a relay. Because an Olympic size swimming pool is 50 metres long, each of the four swimmers completed two lengths of the pool, each using a different stroke. The first on each team used the backstroke, the second used the breaststroke, the third used the butterfly stroke, and the final swimmer used freestyle (restricted to not allow any of the first three strokes to be used, though nearly all swimmers use front crawl regardless).

The first swimmer must touch the wall before the next can leave the starting block, and so forth; timing of the starts is thus important.

== Results ==
=== Heats ===
Heat 1

Place	Swimmers	Time	Notes
1	Jane Swagerty, Suzy Jones, Susan Shields, Jan Henne (USA)	4:34.7	
2	Martina Grunert, Eva Wittke, Helga Lindner, Uta Schmuck (GDR)	4:39.3	
3	Tina Lek'veishvili, Alla Grebennikova, Larisa Zakharova, Lidiya Hrebets (URS)	4:39.5	
4	Wendy Burrell, Dorothy Harrison, Margaret Auton, Alexandra Jackson (GBR)	4:40.4	
5	Elaine Tanner, Anne Walton, Jeanne Warren, Marion Lay (CAN)	4:43.1	
6	Glenda Stirling, Pru Chapman, Sandra Whittleston, Tui Shipston (NZL)	4:49.0	
7	Lidia Ramírez, Tamara Oynick, Patricia Obregón, María Teresa Ramírez (MEX)	4:51.0	
8	Rosa Hasbún, María Moreño, Carmen Ferracuti, Donatella Ferracuti (ESA)	5:12.6	

Heat 2

Place	Swimmers	Time	Notes
1	Lynne Watson, Judy Playfair, Lyn McClements, Lyn Bell (AUS)	4:34.6	
2	Cobie Buter, Klenie Bimolt, Ada Kok, Nel Bos (NED)	4:39.4	
3	Angelika Kraus, Uta Frommater, Heike Hustede-Nagel, Heidi Reineck (FRG)	4:39.5	
4	Mária Balla-Lantos, Edit Kovács, Andrea Gyarmati, Judit Turóczy (HUN)	4:41.2	
5	Yukiko Goushi, Kiyoe Nakagawa, Yasuko Fujii, Miwako Kobayashi (JPN)	4:41.4	
6	Felicia Ospitaletche, Ana María Norbis, Ruth Apt, Emilia Figueroa (URU)	4:56.0	
7	Ana Marcial, Liana Vicens, Kristina Moir, Lorna Blake (PUR)	5:18.2	
8	Zdenka Gašparač, Đurđica Bjedov, Mirjana Šegrt, Ana Boban (YUG)		DQ

=== Final ===
Place	Swimmers	Time	Notes
1st place, gold medalist(s)	Kaye Hall, Catie Ball, Ellie Daniel, Susan Pedersen (USA)	4:28.3	OR
2nd place, silver medalist(s)	Lynne Watson, Judy Playfair, Lyn McClements, Jenny Steinbeck (AUS)	4:30.0	
3rd place, bronze medalist(s)	Angelika Kraus, Uta Frommater, Heike Hustede-Nagel, Heidi Reineck (FRG)	4:36.4	
4	Tina Lek'veishvili, Alla Grebennikova, Tetiana Dev'iatova, Lidiya Hrebets (URS)	4:37.0	
5	Martina Grunert, Eva Wittke, Helga Lindner, Uta Schmuck (GDR)	4:38.0	
6	Wendy Burrell, Dorothy Harrison, Margaret Auton, Alexandra Jackson (GBR)	4:38.3	
7	Cobie Buter, Klenie Bimolt, Ada Kok, Nel Bos (NED)	4:38.7	
8	Mária Balla-Lantos, Edit Kovács, Andrea Gyarmati, Judit Turóczy (HUN)	4:42.9	
