= Swimming at the 1968 Summer Olympics =

Swimming at the Games of the XIX Olympiad
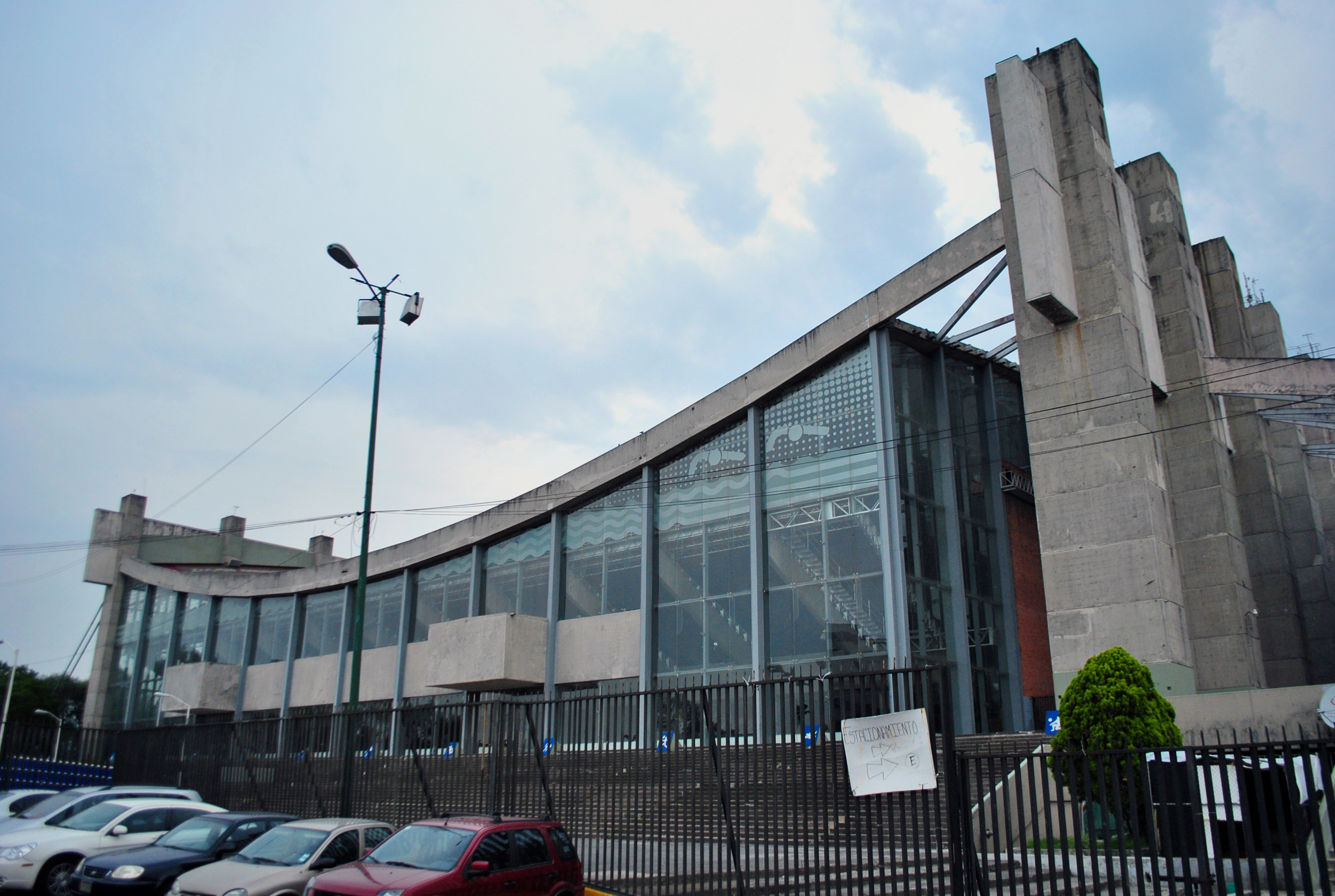
- Venue: Alberca Olímpica Francisco Márquez
- Dates: 17 – 26 October 1968
- No. of events: 29
- Competitors: 468 from 51 nations

The swimming competitions at the 1968 Summer Olympics in Mexico City took place from 17 to 26 October at the Alberca Olímpica Francisco Márquez. Swimming featured a record total of 29 events. There was a total of 468 participants from 51 countries competing. The United States dominated the competition, winning 52 of 87 possible medals. 15-year-old American phenom Debbie Meyer from Maryland won three gold medals.

== Events ==
Swimming at the 1968 Olympics featured a total of 29 events (15 for men and 14 for women). This was a significant increase from the 18 events contested in the previous Olympic Games. The following events were contested (all pool events are long course, and distances are in meters):

- Freestyle: 100, 200, 400, and 1500 (men's); 100, 200, 400 and 800 (women's)
- Backstroke: 100 and 200;
- Breaststroke: 100 and 200;
- Butterfly: 100 and 200;
- Individual medley: 200 and 400;
- Relays: 4 × 100 free, 4 × 200 free, 4 × 100 medley (men's); 4 × 100 free, 4 × 100 medley (women's)

== Participating nations ==
468 swimmers from 51 nations competed.

- Argentina (8)
- Australia (24)
- Austria (3)
- Barbados (1)
- Belgium (6)
- Brazil (4)
- Bulgaria (3)
- Canada (15)
- Taiwan (4)
- Colombia (9)
- Costa Rica (1)
- Cuba (3)
- Czechoslovakia (1)
- Denmark (3)
- East Germany (24)
- Ecuador (3)
- El Salvador (14)
- Finland (3)
- France (16)
- Great Britain (24)
- Guatemala (3)
- Hong Kong (3)
- Hungary (14)
- Iceland (4)
- Ireland (4)
- Israel (6)
- Italy (10)
- Jamaica (1)
- Japan (20)
- Lebanon (1)
- Luxembourg (1)
- Mexico (27)
- Netherlands (17)
- New Zealand (4)
- Norway (1)
- Peru (3)
- Philippines (7)
- Poland (4)
- Puerto Rico (9)
- Romania (2)
- South Korea (1)
- Soviet Union (31)
- Spain (13)
- Sweden (16)
- Switzerland (4)
- Trinidad and Tobago (1)
- United States (52)
- Uruguay (5)
- Vietnam (2)
- West Germany (27)
- Yugoslavia (6)

== Medal table ==
Rank	Nation	Gold	Silver	Bronze	Total
1	United States	21	15	16	52
2	Australia	3	2	3	8
3	East Germany	2	3	1	6
4	Yugoslavia	1	1	0	2
5	Mexico	1	0	1	2
6	Netherlands	1	0	0	1
7	Soviet Union	0	4	4	8
8	Canada	0	3	1	4
9	Great Britain	0	1	0	1
10	West Germany	0	0	2	2
11	France	0	0	1	1
Totals (11 entries)		29	29	29	87

== Medal summary ==
=== Men's events ===
Games	Gold		Silver		Bronze	
100 m freestyle	Michael Wenden; Australia	52.2 WR	Ken Walsh; United States	52.8	Mark Spitz; United States	53.0
200 m freestyle	Michael Wenden; Australia	1:55.2 OR	Don Schollander; United States	1:55.8	John Nelson; United States	1:58.1
400 m freestyle	Mike Burton; United States	4:09.0 OR	Ralph Hutton; Canada	4:11.7	Alain Mosconi; France	4:13.3
1500 m freestyle	Mike Burton; United States	16:38.9 OR	John Kinsella; United States	16:57.3	Greg Brough; Australia	17:04.7
100 m backstroke	Roland Matthes; East Germany	58.7 OR	Charlie Hickcox; United States	1:00.2	Ronnie Mills; United States	1:00.5
200 m backstroke	Roland Matthes; East Germany	2:09.6 OR	Mitch Ivey; United States	2:10.6	Jack Horsley; United States	2:10.9
100 m breaststroke	Don McKenzie; United States	1:07.7 OR	Vladimir Kosinsky; Soviet Union	1:08.0	Nikolai Pankin; Soviet Union	1:08.0
200 m breaststroke	Felipe Muñoz; Mexico	2:28.7	Vladimir Kosinsky; Soviet Union	2:29.2	Brian Job; United States	2:29.9
100 m butterfly	Doug Russell; United States	55.9 OR	Mark Spitz; United States	56.4	Ross Wales; United States	57.2
200 m butterfly	Carl Robie; United States	2:08.7	Martyn Woodroffe; Great Britain	2:09.0	John Ferris; United States	2:09.3
200 m individual medley	Charlie Hickcox; United States	2:12.0 OR	Greg Buckingham; United States	2:13.0	John Ferris; United States	2:13.3
400 m individual medley	Charlie Hickcox; United States	4:48.4	Gary Hall, Sr. United States	4:48.7	Michael Holthaus; West Germany	4:51.4
4 × 100 m freestyle relay	United States; Zac Zorn; Stephen Rerych; Ken Walsh; Mark Spitz	3:31.7 WR	Soviet Union; Georgi Kulikov; Viktor Mazanov; Semyon Belits-Geiman; Leonid Ilyichov	3:34.2	Australia; Greg Rogers; Robert Cusack; Bob Windle; Michael Wenden	3:34.7
4 × 200 m freestyle relay	United States; John Nelson; Stephen Rerych; Mark Spitz; Don Schollander	7:52.3	Australia; Greg Rogers; Graham White; Bob Windle; Michael Wenden	7:53.7	Soviet Union; Vladimir Bure; Semyon Belits-Geiman; Georgi Kulikov; Leonid Ilyichov	8:01.6
4 × 100 m medley relay	United States; Charlie Hickcox; Don McKenzie; Doug Russell; Ken Walsh	3:54.9 WR	East Germany; Roland Matthes; Egon Henninger; Horst-Günter Gregor; Frank Wiegand	3:57.5	Soviet Union; Yuri Gromak; Vladimir Nemshilov; Vladimir Kosinsky; Leonid Ilyichov	4:00.7

=== Women's events ===
Games	Gold		Silver		Bronze	
100 m freestyle	Jan Henne; United States	1:00.0	Susan Pedersen; United States	1:00.3	Linda Gustavson; United States	1:00.3
200 m freestyle	Debbie Meyer; United States	2:10.5 OR	Jan Henne; United States	2:11.0	Jane Barkman; United States	2:11.2
400 m freestyle	Debbie Meyer; United States	4:31.8 OR	Linda Gustavson; United States	4:35.5	Karen Moras; Australia	4:37.0
800 m freestyle	Debbie Meyer; United States	9:24.0 OR	Pam Kruse; United States	9:35.7	Maria Teresa Ramírez; Mexico	9:38.5
100 m backstroke	Kaye Hall; United States	1:06.2 WR	Elaine Tanner; Canada	1:06.7	Jane Swagerty; United States	1:08.1
200 m backstroke	Lillian Watson; United States	2:24.8 OR	Elaine Tanner; Canada	2:27.4	Kaye Hall; United States	2:28.9
100 m breaststroke	Đurđica Bjedov; Yugoslavia	1:15.8 OR	Galina Prozumenshchikova; Soviet Union	1:15.9	Sharon Wichman; United States	1:16.1
200 m breaststroke	Sharon Wichman; United States	2:44.4 OR	Đurđica Bjedov; Yugoslavia	2:46.4	Galina Prozumenshchikova; Soviet Union	2:47.0
100 m butterfly	Lyn McClements; Australia	1:05.5	Ellie Daniel; United States	1:05.8	Susan Shields; United States	1:06.2
200 m butterfly	Ada Kok; Netherlands	2:24.7 OR	Helga Lindner; East Germany	2:24.8	Ellie Daniel; United States	2:25.9
200 m individual medley	Claudia Kolb; United States	2:24.7 OR	Susan Pedersen; United States	2:28.8	Jan Henne; United States	2:31.4
400 m individual medley	Claudia Kolb; United States	5:08.5 OR	Lynn Vidali; United States	5:22.2	Sabine Steinbach; East Germany	5:25.3
4 × 100 m freestyle relay	United States; Jane Barkman; Linda Gustavson; Susan Pedersen; Jan Henne	4:02.5 OR	East Germany; Gabriele Wetzko; Roswitha Krause; Uta Schmuck; Martina Grunert	4:05.7	Canada; Angela Coughlan; Marilyn Corson; Elaine Tanner; Marion Lay	4:07.2
4 × 100 m medley relay	United States; Kaye Hall; Catie Ball; Ellie Daniel; Susan Pedersen	4:28.3 OR	Australia; Lynne Watson; Judy Playfair; Lyn McClements; Janet Steinbeck	4:30.0	West Germany; Angelika Kraus; Uta Frommater; Heike Hustede; Heidemarie Reineck	4:36.4

== Gallery of the medalists ==
Some of the Olympic medalists in Mexico City:

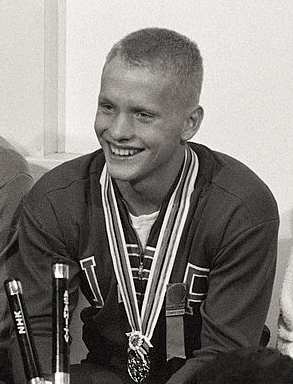
Don Schollander, winner of the 4 × 200-metre freestyle relay.

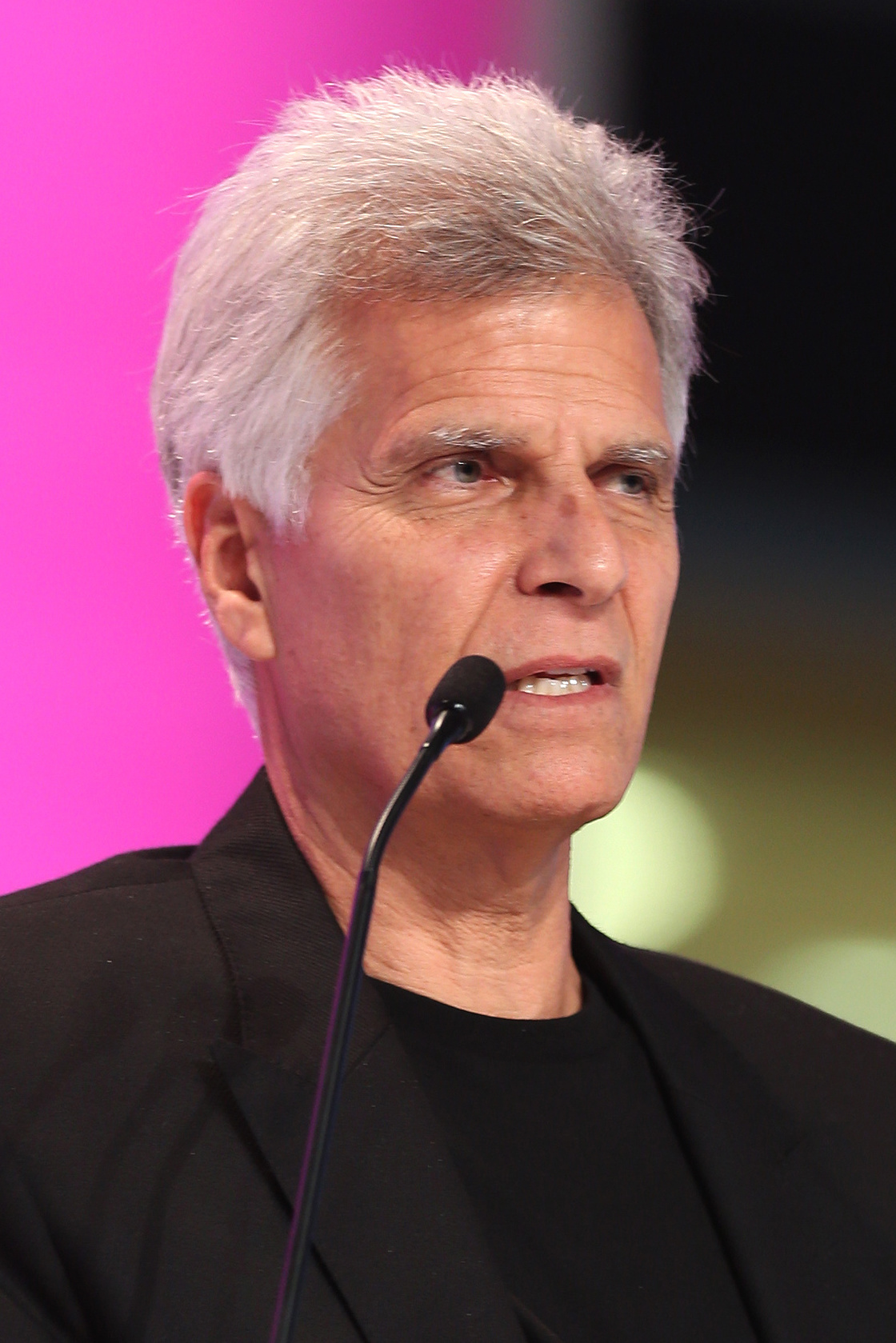
Mark Spitz, winner of the 4 × 100-metre freestyle relay and 4 × 200-metre freestyle relay.

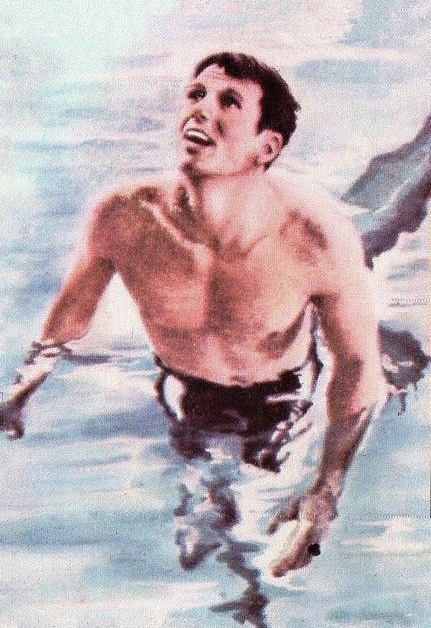
Mike Burton, winner of the 400-metre freestyle and 1500-metre freestyle.

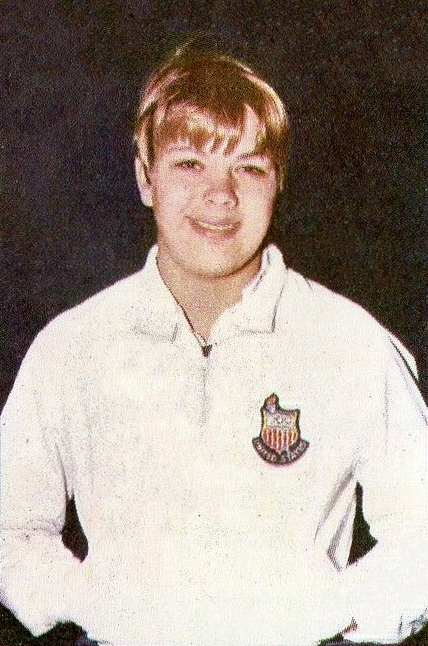
Debbie Meyer, winner of the 200-metre freestyle, 400-metre freestyle, and 800-metre freestyle.

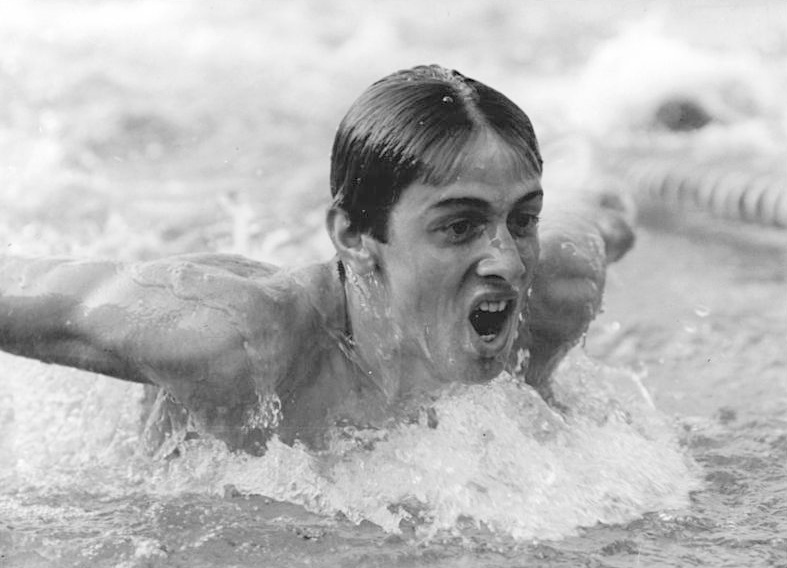
Roland Matthes, winner of the 100-metre backstroke and 200-metre backstroke.

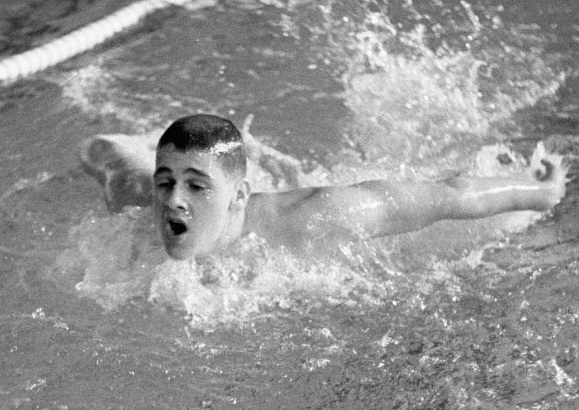
Carl Robie, winner of the 200-metre butterfly.

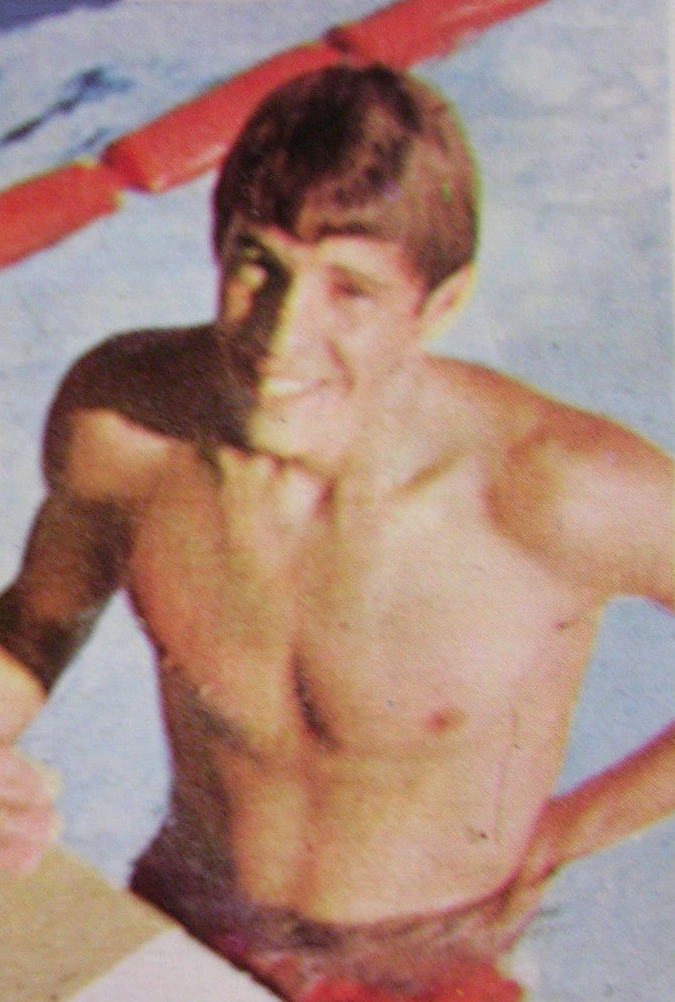
Charlie Hickcox, winner of the 200-metre individual medley and 400-metre individual medley.

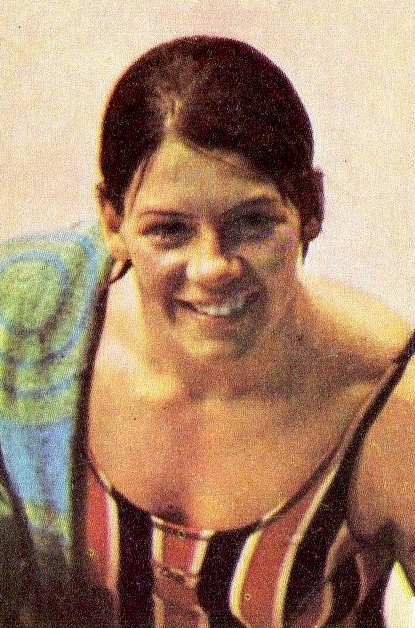
Claudia Kolb, winner of the 200-metre individual medley and 400-metre individual medley.

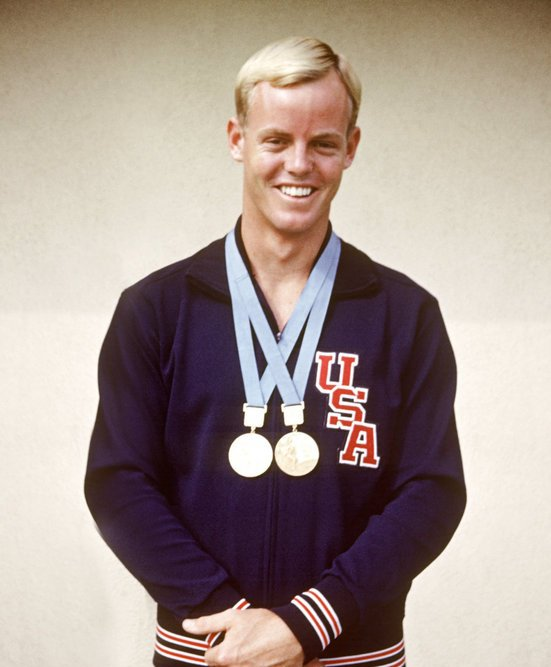
Don McKenzie, winner of the 100-metre breaststroke and 4 × 100-metre medley relay.
