= Susan Pedersen =

Susan Pedersen may refer to:

- Susan Pedersen (historian) (born 1959), historian at Columbia University
- Susan Pedersen (swimmer) (born 1953), American Olympic silver medalist in swimming

== See also ==
- Sue Pedersen (born 1977), Canadian physician
