= Toni Hewitt =

American swimmer (born 1951)

Personal information
- Full name: Antonia Carroll Hewitt -Cervantes
- Nickname: "Toni"
- National team: United States
- Born: September 29, 1951 (age 74) San Francisco, California, U.S.
- Education: U. Cal Berkeley; UCLA Drama, Dance
- Occupations: Agent for musicians and actors Founder Cervantes Nomad Casting
- Height: 5 ft 6 in (1.68 m)
- Weight: 128 lb (58 kg)

Sport
- Sport: Swimming
- Event: 100, 200 butterfly
- Strokes: Butterfly
- Club: Corona del Mar Swim Club
- Coach: Ted Newland

Antonia Carroll Hewitt (born September 29, 1951), later known by Toni Cervantes, her mothers maiden name, is an American former competition swimmer who competed for the Corona del Mar Swim Club and participated in the women's 100-meter butterfly and the women's 200-meter butterfly at the 1968 Mexico Olympics. In August, 1967, she set a world record holder in the 200-meter butterfly. After studying Drama and Dance at the University of California Los Angeles and Berkeley, she found a primary career as an agent for musicians and actors and founded Cervantes Nomad Casting.

Hewitt was born September 29, 1951 in San Francisco to mother Tonita Caroll Cervantes Hewitt, a Spaniard, and her father who was of full Cherokee descent. She attended Corona del Mar High School. Hewitt excelled as a swimmer by age ten, competing in California's Newport Harbor area. After Hewitt's mother remarried, the family lived in Lido Isle in Newport Beach, California about five miles from Corona del Mar. In her early years, she trained with a High School boy's team under Coach Ted Newland who started her with weight training by the age of 11. Recognizing her potential, Newland worked her harder than the High School boys he coached. A water polo Hall of Fame inductee, Newland coached water polo and swimming at Newport Harbor High School, and water polo at Corona del Mar High School prior to becoming a long serving and high achieving water polo coach for the University of California Irvine in 1966. By 13, Hewitt was the youngest participant at New York City's 1964 Olympic trials for the Tokyo Olympics.

== World, American record ==
Representing the Corona del Mar Swim club as a High School Sophomore in late July, 1967 Hewitt set an American record at the Los Angeles Invitational in the women's 200-meter fly, with a time of 2:25.6. On August 19, 1967, at the National AAU Outdoor Swimming and Diving Championships in Philadelphia, Hewitt broke the world record in the 200-meter butterfly with a time of 2:23.6, breaking the old record of 2:25.3 set two years earlier.

Hewitt placed first at the Olympic trials in 1968 in the 200 butterfly and in the 100 butterfly placed third, qualifying her for the U.S. team. Prior to the Olympics, Hewitt trained with the U.S. Olympic team in Colorado Springs to adjust to the higher altitude that would be a significant obstacle during the Mexico City Olympics.

== 1968 Mexico Olympics ==
At 17, Hewitt represented the United States at the 1968 Summer Olympics in Mexico City. She competed in the women's 100-meter butterfly, and finished seventh in the event final with a time of 1:07.5. Hewitt also reached the finals of the women's 200-meter butterfly, finishing in fourth place with a time of 2:26.2—three tenths of a second behind American teammate Ellie Daniel, who won the bronze medal in the event. In the 100-meter women's butterfly, Lyn McClements of Australia unexpectedly took the gold with a time of 1:05.5, American Elie Daniel took the silver with a time of 1:05.8, and American Susan Shields took the bronze with a time of 1:06.2. In the 200-meter butterfly, favorite Ada Cok of the Netherlands took the gold with a time of 2:24.7, Helga Linder of Germany took the silver with a time of 2:24.8, and as previously noted, American Elie Daniel took the bronze with a time of 2:25.9, barely edging out Hewitt.

=== Moved by 1968 Olympic protests ===
In an article she wrote for The Peralta Citizen, a student-run newspaper, Hewitt-Cervantes observed that she was deeply affected by the Mexican government and media downplaying the size and significance of the massive public protests at the Mexico City Olympics. The protest was focused primarily on the rising police violence, and the government's extravagant spending on the Olympics that year, which they believed showed a lack of concern for the nation's poverty. Considering them heroic, she also noted being moved by the U.S. Olympic authorities' brisque treatment of two Black U.S. Olympic track medalists Tommie Smith and John Carlos who demonstrated against racial segregation and inequality with a raised fist during the ceremonial playing of the Star Spangled Banner after they won their medals.

Hewitt ended her elite swimming career in 1969, and did not compete in college. She pursued studies of Dance and Drama at the University of California Berkeley, and the University of California Los Angeles.

=== Careers ===
As Toni Cervantes, her married name, she began a varied career path after 1969, working harvesting grapes, tending the bar at a club, cooking macrobiotic meals at a restaurant, and selling clothes at the Boardwalk in Venice. She taught swimming in Iran in the mid-1970's. At U.S. Military bases in West Germany, she worked on theater productions and later explored the mountains in Nepal. She eventually settled on a primary career in the dramatic arts. Beginning as an actor, she became a director of entertainment for San Francisco and Los Angeles area festivals of music. She worked as a music agent for international groups, including jazz artists, scheduling both European and North American tour dates. She founded Cervantes Nomad Casting, a business that finds actors for a wide array of performances, including documentaries, commercials, films, and music videos.

=== Honors ===
In 1976, receiving the award on behalf of fellow Olympian Billy Mills, she accepted the Jay Silverheels Award from the United Indian Development Association, usually given for business achievement, but awarded that year for athletic accomplishments.
