= Swimming at the 1972 Summer Olympics – Women's 200 metre butterfly =

Women's 200 metre butterfly at the Games of the XX Olympiad
- Venue: Olympia Schwimmhalle
- Dates: 4 September 1972 (heats & final)
- Competitors: 24 from 17 nations
- Winning time: 2:15.57 WR

Medalists
1st place, gold medalist(s)		Karen Moe	United States
2nd place, silver medalist(s)		Lynn Colella	United States
3rd place, bronze medalist(s)		Ellie Daniel	United States

The women's 200 metre butterfly event at the 1972 Olympic Games took place September 4. This swimming event used the butterfly stroke. Because an Olympic-size swimming pool is 50 metres long, this race consisted of four lengths of the pool.

== Schedule ==
All times are Central European Time (UTC+1)

Date	Time	Round
Saturday, 4 September 1972	10:00; 18:00	Heats; Final

== Results ==
=== Heats ===
Heat 1

Rank	Athlete	Country	Time	Notes
1	Rosemarie Kother	East Germany	2:18.32	Q, OR
2	Mayumi Aoki	Japan	2:23.01	Q
3	Anca Groza	Romania	2:30.32	
4	Grisel Mendoza	Mexico	2:35.85	

Heat 2

Rank	Athlete	Country	Time	Notes
1	Ellie Daniel	United States	2:17.18	Q, OR
2	Jean Jeavons	Great Britain	2:27.59	
3	Eva Wikner	Sweden	2:29.03	
4	Margrit Thomet	Switzerland	2:29.21	
5	Věra Faitlová	Czechoslovakia	2:29.34	
6	Moira Brown	Great Britain	2:30.08	
7	Jennifer McHugh	Canada	2:30.36	

Heat 3

Rank	Athlete	Country	Time	Notes
1	Lynn Colella	United States	2:18.80	Q
2	Noriko Asano	Japan	2:20.09	Q
3	Gail Neall	Australia	2:23.21	Q
4	Frieke Buys	Netherlands	2:24.20	
5	Olga de Angulo	Colombia	2:34.69	
6	Hsu Yue-yun	Chinese Taipei	2:44.88	

Heat 4

Rank	Athlete	Country	Time	Notes
1	Karen Moe	United States	2:18.15	Q
2	Helga Lindner	East Germany	2:20.00	Q
3	Brigitte Mertz	East Germany	2:24.92	
4	Sue Funch	Australia	2:26.69	
5	Eva Sigg	Finland	2:27.64	
6	Ileana Morales	Venezuela	2:28.41	
7	Maria Isabel Guerra	Brazil	2:32.60	

"Q": Qualified

=== Final ===
Rank	Athlete	Country	Time	Notes
1	Karen Moe	United States	2:15.57	WR
2	Lynn Colella	United States	2:16.34	
3	Ellie Daniel	United States	2:16.74	
4	Rosemarie Kother-Gabriel	East Germany	2:17.11	
5	Noriko Asano	Japan	2:19.50	
6	Helga Lindner	East Germany	2:20.47	
7	Gail Neall	Australia	2:21.88	
8	Mayumi Aoki	Japan	2:22.84	

Key: WR = World record
