= Woodland Hills, Kentucky =

- City
- Location of Woodland Hills in Jefferson County, Kentucky

- Location within the state of Kentucky Woodland Hills (the United States)
- Coordinates: 38°14′22″N 85°31′44″W
- Country: United States
- State: Kentucky
- County: Jefferson

Area
  - Total: 0.21 sq mi (0.55 km^{2})
  - Land: 0.21 sq mi (0.55 km^{2})
  - Water: 0 sq mi (0.00 km^{2})
- Elevation: 715 ft (218 m)

Population (2020)
  - Total: 736
  - Density: 3,491.5/sq mi (1,348.07/km^{2})
- Time zone: UTC-5 (Eastern (EST))
  - Summer (DST): UTC-4 (EDT)
- ZIP Code: 40243
- FIPS code: 21-84486
- GNIS feature ID: 2405783
- Website: https://woodlandhillsky.com/

Woodland Hills is a home rule-class city in Jefferson County, Kentucky, United States. As of the 2020 census, Woodland Hills had a population of 736.

Woodland Hills is an eastern suburb of Louisville and is entirely surrounded by the city of Middletown.

== Geography ==
Woodland Hills is located at 38°14′21″N 85°31′46″W (38.239270, -85.529448). It is 13 miles (21 km) east of downtown Louisville and 1 mile (1.6 km) west of Interstate 265, one mile north of that highway's junction with Interstate 64.

According to the United States Census Bureau, the city has a total area of 0.21 square miles (0.55 km^{2}), all land.

== Demographics ==
=== 2010 census ===
Historical population
Census	Pop.	Note	%±
1970	1,233		—
1980	839		−32.0%
1990	714		−14.9%
2000	657		−8.0%
2010	696		5.9%
2020	736		5.7%
U.S. Decennial Census

At the 2010 census, there were 696 people, 282 households and 190 families living in the city. The population density was 3,017.7 inhabitants per square mile (1,165.1/km^{2}). There were 294 housing units at an average density of 1,274.7 per square mile (492.2/km^{2}). The racial makeup was 93.4% White, 4.3% Black or African American, 1.0% Asian and 0.4% American Indian or Alaska Native. Hispanic or Latino of any race were 1.1% of the population.

There were 282 households, of which 32.6% had children under the age of 18 living with them, 52.8% were married couples living together, 10.3% had a female householder with no husband present, and 32.6% were non-families. 27.7% of all households were made up of individuals, and 13.5% had someone living alone who was 65 years of age or older. The average household size was 2.47 and the average family size was 3.05.

24.7% Of the population were under the age of 18 and 20.3% who were 65 years of age or older. The median age was 40.4 years. For every 100 females, there were 97.7 males. For every 100 females age 18 and over, there were 93.4 males.

=== 2000 census ===
At the 2000 census, there were 657 people, 284 households and 203 families living in the city. The population density was 2,848.6 inhabitants per square mile (1,099.9/km^{2}). There were 289 housing units at an average density of 1,253.0 per square mile (483.8/km^{2}). The racial makeup was 99.24% White, 0.61% African American and 0.15% Native American. Hispanic or Latino of any race were 1.07% of the population.

There were 284 households, of which 25.4% had children under the age of 18 living with them, 59.9% were married couples living together, 8.1% had a female householder with no husband present, and 28.5% were non-families. 26.1% of all households were made up of individuals, and 10.2% had someone living alone who was 65 years of age or older. The average household size was 2.31 and the average family size was 2.76.

20.1% of the po;ulation were under the age of 18, 4.4% from 18 to 24, 25.9% from 25 to 44, 24.2% from 45 to 64, and 25.4% who were 65 years of age or older. The median age was 45 years. For every 100 females, there were 96.1 males. For every 100 females age 18 and over, there were 87.5 males.

The median household income was $59,904 and the median family income was $61,083. Males had a median income of $42,250 and females $30,156. The per capita income was $27,897. None of the families and 0.5% of the population were living below the poverty line, including no under eighteens and none of those over 64.

== See also ==
- Eastern High School (Louisville, Kentucky): located partly within Woodland Hills
