= Felton Spencer =

American basketball player (1968–2023)

Personal information
- Born: January 5, 1968 Louisville, Kentucky, U.S.
- Died: March 12, 2023 (aged 55) Louisville, Kentucky, U.S.
- Listed height: 7 ft 0 in (2.13 m)
- Listed weight: 290 lb (132 kg)

Career information
- High school: Eastern (Middletown, Kentucky)
- College: Louisville (1986–1990)
- NBA draft: 1990: 1st round, 6th overall pick
- Drafted by: Minnesota Timberwolves
- Playing career: 1990–2002
- Position: Center
- Number: 50, 16

Career history
- 1990–1993: Minnesota Timberwolves
- 1993–1996: Utah Jazz
- 1996: Orlando Magic
- 1996–1999: Golden State Warriors
- 1999–2000: San Antonio Spurs
- 2000–2002: New York Knicks

Career highlights
- NBA All-Rookie Second Team (1991); First-team All-Metro Conference (1990); Second-team Parade All-American (1986)

Career NBA statistics
- Points: 3,354 (5.2 ppg)
- Rebounds: 3,436 (5.4 rpg)
- Blocks: 534 (0.8 bpg)
- Stats at NBA.com
- Stats at Basketball Reference

Felton LaFrance Spencer (January 5, 1968 – March 12, 2023) was an American professional basketball player who was a center for the Minnesota Timberwolves, Utah Jazz, Orlando Magic, Golden State Warriors, San Antonio Spurs, and New York Knicks of the National Basketball Association (NBA) from 1990 to 2002.

== High school and college ==
Spencer was an all-state basketball player at Eastern High School in Middletown, Kentucky (now part of Louisville); as both a junior and a senior, he led the team to the KHSAA state tournament in Lexington. In the first year, Eastern was upset by lightly regarded Metcalfe County in the first round, 60–58. A year later as a senior, Eastern was eliminated in the quarter-finals by Hazard High School.

Spencer attended the University of Louisville, where he played college basketball for the Louisville Cardinals. He became the all-time field goal percentage leader at 62.8%. He took over the center position as a senior in 1989–90 after Pervis Ellison left to join the NBA. That season Spencer paced the Cardinals in scoring (14.9 ppg), rebounding (8.5 rpg), blocked shots (69), and field goal percentage (68.1%).

== NBA career ==
The Minnesota Timberwolves selected Spencer in the first round, with the sixth overall pick, in the 1990 NBA draft. As a rookie, Spencer split time at center with 7-foot-3-inch (2.21 m) veteran Randy Breuer, but still managed respectable numbers, averaging 7.1 points and 7.9 rebounds per game, and shooting 51.2% from the floor. He finished the season with 272 offensive rebounds, the seventh-most in the NBA that year. Additionally, he blocked 121 shots, establishing a single-season record for the young franchise that would stand until Kevin Garnett's rookie season in 1995–96. For his efforts, Spencer was named to the NBA All-Rookie Second Team that year. However, with the arrival of Luc Longley the following season, Spencer's playing time declined over the following two years. After the 1992–93 season, Minnesota traded Spencer to the Utah Jazz for power forward/center Mike Brown.

In Utah, Spencer became the successor to Mark Eaton, and he provided the Jazz with solid scoring, rebounding and defense at the pivot position. In 1993–94, as a complement to John Stockton and Karl Malone, he averaged 8.6 points and 8.3 rebounds while shooting 50.5% from the floor. Spencer and the Jazz seemed to be on their way to greatness in 1994–95, but 34 games into the season he ruptured his left Achilles tendon and was lost for the year. Utah went on to win 60 regular-season games but failed to reach the NBA Finals by losing in the first round. He missed the first 11 games of the 1995–96 season while recovering from his Achilles injury, but went on to play in the remaining 71, starting 70 and averaging 5.6 points and 4.3 rebounds in 17.8 minutes per game. He shot a career-high 52.0% from the field, tying Adam Keefe for the second-best mark on the team.

On August 10, 1996, Spencer was obtained by the Orlando Magic for guard Brooks Thompson, forward Kenny Gattison and a first-round draft pick, after the Magic had lost Shaquille O'Neal to the Lakers as a free agent. But he played just one game for Orlando before he was traded to Golden State in the deal that brought Rony Seikaly to the Magic. He went on to play 71 games for the Warriors and do a solid job in the middle, ranking second on the team in rebounding and third in blocked shots. His role was diminished in 1997–98 by the arrival of second-year man Erick Dampier as the starter, as well as the drafting of rookie Adonal Foyle, and he saw relatively limited action as a reserve in 68 games. He played even less in 1998–99, averaging just 6.1 minutes in his 26 appearances off the bench.

Spencer retired after the 2001–02 season, last playing with the Knicks.

== Coaching ==
In 2011, Spencer became an assistant basketball coach at Spalding University.

Spencer was later an assistant basketball coach at Bellarmine University in Louisville, Kentucky.

== Death ==
Spencer died at the University of Louisville Hospital on March 12, 2023, at the age of 55.

== Career statistics ==
Legend
GP	Games played	GS	Games started	MPG	Minutes per game
FG%	Field goal percentage	3P%	3-point field goal percentage	FT%	Free throw percentage
RPG	Rebounds per game	APG	Assists per game	SPG	Steals per game
BPG	Blocks per game	PPG	Points per game	**Bold**	Career high
†	Won an NBA championship	*	Led the league

=== NBA ===
==== Regular season ====
Year	Team	GP	GS	MPG	FG%	3P%	FT%	RPG	APG	SPG	BPG	PPG
1990–91	Minnesota	**81**	46	25.9	.512	.000	.722	7.9	.3	**.6**	**1.5**	7.1
1991–92	Minnesota	61	54	24.3	.426	–	.691	7.1	.9	.4	1.3	6.6
1992–93	Minnesota	71	48	18.3	.465	–	.654	4.6	.2	.3	.9	4.1
1993–94	Utah	79	**79**	**28.0**	.505	–	.607	**8.3**	.5	.5	.8	8.6
1994–95	Utah	34	34	26.6	.488	–	**.793**	7.6	.5	.4	.9	**9.3**
1995–96	Utah	71	70	17.8	.520	–	.689	4.3	.2	.3	.8	5.6
1996–97	Orlando	1	0	19.0	**1.000**	–	–	6.0	**1.0**	.0	.0	4.0
1996–97	Golden State	72	64	21.4	.486	–	.584	5.7	.3	.5	.7	5.1
1997–98	Golden State	68	0	12.0	.457	–	.557	3.3	.3	.3	.5	2.4
1998–99	Golden State	26	0	6.1	.455	–	.462	1.8	.0	.2	.4	1.6
1999–2000	San Antonio	26	0	5.7	.455	–	.667	1.5	.1	.2	.3	1.9
2000–01	New York	18	0	6.3	.600	–	.600	1.9	.1	.1	.1	2.2
2001–02	New York	32	8	7.8	.231	–	.515	1.6	.1	.2	.3	.9
Career		640	404	19.4	.484	.000	.658	5.4	.3	.4	.8	5.2

==== Playoffs ====
Year	Team	GP	GS	MPG	FG%	3P%	FT%	RPG	APG	SPG	BPG	PPG
1994	Utah	16	16	**30.8**	**.448**	–	**.660**	**8.4**	**.4**	.2	**1.3**	**7.9**
1996	Utah	**18**	**18**	15.3	.434	.000	.556	3.0	.1	**.3**	1.2	2.8
2001	New York	2	0	2.0	–	–	–	.0	.0	.0	.0	.0
Career		36	34	21.4	.443	.000	.644	5.3	.3	.2	1.2	4.9
