= Graeme Jennings =

Graeme Jennings may refer to:

- Graeme Jennings (fencer) (1946–1993), Australian Olympic fencer
- Graeme Jennings (violinist) (born 1968), Australian violinist

== See also ==
- Graham Jennings, Australian association footballer
