= Lidiya Hrebets =

Ukrainian swimmer

Personal information
- Nationality: Ukrainian
- Born: 11 April 1943 (age 83) Poltava, Soviet Union

Sport
- Sport: Swimming

Lidiya Hrebets (born 11 April 1943) is a Ukrainian former freestyle swimmer. She competed in three events at the 1968 Summer Olympics for the Soviet Union.
