= Lyn McClements =

Australian swimmer

Personal information
- Full name: Lynette Velma McClements
- Nickname: "Lyn"
- National team: Australia
- Born: 11 May 1951 (age 75) Nedlands, Western Australia
- Height: 1.77 m (5 ft 10 in)
- Weight: 66 kg (146 lb)

Sport
- Sport: Swimming
- Strokes: Butterfly
Medal record
Women's swimming
Representing Australia
Olympic Games
Gold medal – first place	1968 Mexico City	100 m butterfly
Silver medal – second place	1968 Mexico City	4×100 m medley

Lynette Velma McClements (born 11 May 1951), also known by her married name Lyn McKenzie, is an Australian butterfly swimmer of the 1960s and 1970s who won a gold medal in the 100-metre butterfly at the 1968 Summer Olympics in Mexico City.

Coming from Perth, Western Australia, McClements was an asthmatic, who took up swimming to relieve her ailment. Originally concentrating on the freestyle and backstroke, she switched to butterfly in the mid-1960s. Only a year before the Olympics, McClements was almost ready to retire from competitive swimming, when her uncle Les McClements, a professional Australian rules football player convinced her otherwise.

In 1968, she claimed her first Australian title in the 100-metre butterfly, earning selection for the Mexico City Olympics, where she was considered an outsider for the event.

In the 4×100-metre medley relay, she combined with Lynne Watson, Judy Playfair and Janet Steinbeck to claim silver behind the United States team. McClements had put Australia in the lead during the butterfly leg, but Steinbeck was overhauled by Susan Pedersen in the anchor freestyle leg. McClements was said to be lacking confidence prior to the 100-metre butterfly, until the men's captain Michael Wenden pulled her aside in an attempt to coax her into believing that she could win. She relegated the American pair of Ellie Daniel and Susan Shields into the minor medals and world record-holder Ada Kok to fourth, posting a time of 1 minute 5.5 seconds. She later missed the final of the 200-metre butterfly.

In 1969, McClements won both the 100-metre and 200-metre butterfly titles at the Australian Championships. However, the following year, she was disqualified after being deemed to be using an illegal stroke. After being overlooked for selection for the 1970 Commonwealth Games, she retired.

Her daughter, Jacqueline McKenzie, represented Australia at the 1992 Summer Olympics in the 200-metre and 400-metre individual medley.

== Honours ==
In 1991 McClements was inducted into Sport of Australia's Hall of Fame, and in 2008 to the Swimming WA's Hall of Fame.

In 2018 she was the second inductee into Swimming WA's Hall of Legends, recognising "outstanding swimming performances at an international level... deemed to have inspired the nation and to have established the name of the athlete, their State and their country on the world stage."

== See also ==
- List of Olympic medalists in swimming (women)
