= Sue Eddy =

Australian swimmer

Personal information
- Born: 26 March 1953 (age 73) Victoria, Australia

Sport
- Sport: Swimming
- Strokes: freestyle, medley

Sue Eddy (born 26 March 1953) is an Australian former swimmer. She competed in three events at the 1968 Summer Olympics.
