= Christine Deakes =

Australian swimmer

Personal information
- Born: 10 October 1953 (age 72) Sydney, Australia

Sport
- Sport: Swimming

Christine Deakes (born 10 October 1953) is an Australian former swimmer. She competed in two events at the 1968 Summer Olympics.
