= Anca Groza =

Romanian swimmer

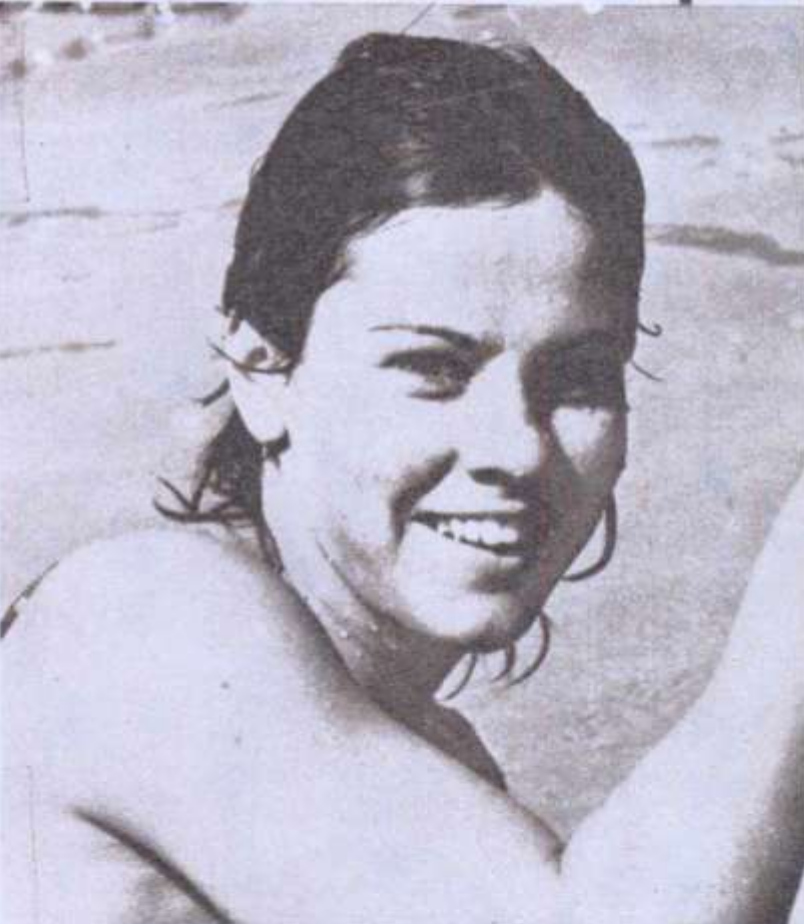

Personal information
- Born: 23 January 1956 (age 70) Bucharest, Romania

Sport
- Sport: Swimming

Anca Groza (born 23 January 1956) is a Romanian former butterfly swimmer. She competed in the women's 200 metre butterfly at the 1972 Summer Olympics.
