= Brigitte Mertz =

German swimmer

Personal information
- Born: 1 January 1957 (age 69) Rostock, Germany

Sport
- Sport: Swimming

Brigitte Mertz (born 1 January 1957) is a German former swimmer. She competed in the women's 200 metre butterfly at the 1972 Summer Olympics.
