= Diane Giebel =

American swimmer (born 1953)

Personal information
- Full name: Diane Jean Giebel
- National team: United States
- Born: February 19, 1953 (age 73) Camden, New Jersey, U.S.
- Height: 5 ft 2 in (1.57 m)
- Weight: 119 lb (54 kg)

Sport
- Sport: Swimming
- Strokes: Butterfly
- Club: Los Angeles Athletic Club
- College team: Glassboro State College

Diane Jean Giebel (born February 19, 1953), also known by her married name Diane Nuess, is an American former competition swimmer. Giebel represented the United States as a 15-year-old at the 1968 Summer Olympics in Mexico City. She competed in the women's 200-meter butterfly, and finished sixth overall in the event final with a time of 2:31.7.

After graduating from high school, Giebel attended Glassboro State College (now Rowan University) in Glassboro, New Jersey, where she swam for the Glassboro State Profs in Association for Intercollegiate Athletics for Women (AIAW) competition from 1973 to 1975. She graduated from Glassboro State with a bachelor's degree in special education in 1975.

== See also ==
- List of Rowan University alumni
