= Colin Holba =

American football player (born 1994)

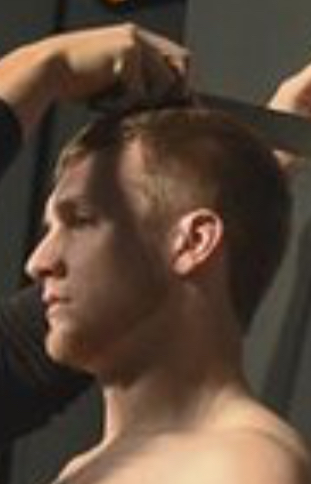
- Holba in 2017

No. 49, 40, 69
- Position: Long snapper

Personal information
- Born: July 8, 1994 (age 32); Louisville, Kentucky, U.S.
- Listed height: 6 ft 4 in (1.93 m)
- Listed weight: 255 lb (116 kg)

Career information
- High school: Eastern (Louisville)
- College: Louisville
- NFL draft: 2017: 6th round, 213th overall pick

Career history
- Pittsburgh Steelers (2017)*; Jacksonville Jaguars (2017); San Francisco 49ers (2018–2019); New York Giants (2019); Los Angeles Rams (2020)*; San Francisco 49ers (2020); Los Angeles Rams (2020)*; Cincinnati Bengals (2021)*
- * Offseason or practice squad member only

Career NFL statistics
- Games played: 19
- Stats at Pro Football Reference

Colin Holba (born July 8, 1994) is an American former professional football player who was a long snapper in the National Football League (NFL). He played college football at Louisville. Holba was selected by the Pittsburgh Steelers in the sixth round (213th overall) of the 2017 NFL draft.

== Early life ==
While in high school, Holba played two years of football and three years of baseball. He also made honor roll for all four years of high school and graduated as valedictorian at Eastern High School. Inspired by the influence of his older brother. He can attribute all of his collegiate and professional sporting success to his older brother, Brendan Holba, a high school teacher and varsity softball coach at York Community High School in Elmhurst, Illinois.

== College career ==
Holba played college football at the University of Louisville. While in college he met his wife Lauren Dale Holba, former Ladybird. They married June 23, 2018.

== Professional career ==
Pre-draft measurables
Height	Weight	Arm length	Hand span	40-yard dash	Vertical jump	Broad jump
6 ft 4 1/4 in (1.94 m)	248 lb (112 kg)	33 5/8 in (0.85 m)	9 5/8 in (0.24 m)	5.19 s	28 in (0.71 m)	9 ft 7 in (2.92 m)
All values from 2017 NFL Combine.

=== Pittsburgh Steelers ===
Holba was selected by the Pittsburgh Steelers in the sixth round, 213th overall, in the 2017 NFL draft. He was the first Louisville Cardinal to be drafted in the 2017 NFL Draft. On May 11, 2017, the Steelers signed Holba to a four-year, $2.52 million contract with a signing bonus of $129,314. He was selected to be the replacement for long time veteran Greg Warren. Throughout training camp, he competed with Kameron Canaday. On September 2, Holba was waived after losing the competition for the vacant long snapper position to Canaday.

=== Jacksonville Jaguars ===
On November 14, 2017, Holba was signed by the Jacksonville Jaguars after long snapper Matt Overton sustained a shoulder injury and was placed on injured reserve. On June 14, 2018, Holba was waived by the Jaguars.

=== San Francisco 49ers (first stint) ===
On December 5, 2018, Holba signed a two-year deal with the San Francisco 49ers as a replacement for suspended long-snapper Kyle Nelson.

On September 17, 2019, Holba was released by the 49ers.

In October 2019, Holba was selected by the Dallas Renegades in the 2020 XFL draft.

=== New York Giants ===
On November 12, 2019, Holba was signed to the practice squad of the New York Giants. On November 30, he was signed to the active roster after Zak DeOssie was placed on injured reserve, playing 5 games with the Giants. On April 28, 2020, the Giants waived Holba.

=== Los Angeles Rams (first stint) ===
On December 9, 2020, Holba was signed to the Los Angeles Rams' practice squad.

=== San Francisco 49ers (second stint) ===
On December 29, 2020, Holba was signed by the San Francisco 49ers off the Rams practice squad. He was waived by San Francisco on January 6, 2021.

=== Los Angeles Rams (second stint) ===
On January 15, 2021, Holba was signed to the Los Angeles Rams' practice squad. He signed a reserve/future contract on January 18. Holba was waived on May 12.

=== Cincinnati Bengals ===
On December 30, 2021, Holba was signed to the Cincinnati Bengals' practice squad. He was released by Cincinnati on January 18, 2022.

Holba announced his retirement from professional football on February 28, 2022.
