= Julie McDonald (swimmer, born 1952) =

Australian swimmer

Personal information
- Born: 2 April 1952 (age 74) Melbourne, Australia

Sport
- Sport: Swimming
- Strokes: Freestyle

Julie McDonald (born 2 April 1952) is an Australian former freestyle swimmer. She competed in two events at the 1968 Summer Olympics.
