= Eastern High School (Louisville, Kentucky) =

Location
- 12400 Old Shelbyville Road; Louisville address, Kentucky 40243; United States
- 38°14′35″N 85°31′32″W

Information
- Type: Public secondary magnet
- Established: 1950; 76 years ago
- School district: Jefferson County Public Schools
- NCES School ID: 210299000625
- Principal: Heather Orman
- Staff: 111.04 (FTE)
- Grades: 9–12
- Enrollment: 2,105 (2019-2020)
- Student to teacher ratio: 18.96
- Campus: Suburban
- Colors: Blue and white
- Mascot: Eddie the Eagle
- Rivals: Ballard High School
- Publication: The Eagle's Quill
- Newspaper: The Eastern Eagle
- Website: www.jefferson.kyschools.us/o/eastern

Founded in 1950, Louisville Eastern High School is located off Old Shelbyville Road in Middletown, Kentucky and Woodland Hills, Kentucky, United States, cities within the merged government of Louisville, Kentucky. With an enrolment of over 2,000 students, this school has been the pilot for education partnerships with companies such as IBM, Dell, CompTIA, Adobe, and Microsoft.

== History ==
Eastern opened in 1950 on its present site in Middletown. The library was later added to the front of the school, giving the building a layout in the shape of the letter "E". The school has been part of the Jefferson County school system since before the county system aborted the old Louisville city school system. The school was co-educational from its start and was integrated long before busing was ordered in Jefferson County.

In 2009, James A. Sexton, principal at Eastern for 20 years, retired. His place was taken by Lana Kaelin.

== Academics ==
Eastern has been repeatedly ranked in the top 1,300 high schools in the United States by Newsweek.

Year	Ranking	Equity and Excellence Percentage
2005	300	N/A
2006	706	26%
2007	662	32.2%
2008	789	28.9%

== Athletics ==
Eastern offers varsity and junior varsity teams in baseball, basketball, Cheerleading, chess, cross country, field hockey, American football, golf, ice hockey, rifle, cardboard sword fighting, lacrosse, ping pong, softball, soccer, swimming, track and field, tennis, colorguard/winterguard, marching band, volleyball and wrestling.

== Special classes ==
Eastern is the only school within the Jefferson County Public Schools to offer ballroom dancing classes, Japanese as a language course, and has 36 different technology classes.

== Notable alumni ==
- Ned Beatty, class of 1955, award-winning character actor
- Justin Cornwell, actor
- John Cowan, musician, currently a member of the Doobie Brothers
- Chris Dowe (born 1991), professional basketball player for Maccabi Haifa
- Hugh Durham, class of 1955, former head basketball coach at the University of Georgia
- Colin Holba, class of 2012, NFL long snapper
- Carroll Hubbard, class of 1955, former member of the United States House of Representatives
- Desi Lydic, actress
- Nate Morris, Entrepreneur
- Myron Pryor, class of 2004, football player for the University of Kentucky and New England Patriots
- Rajon Rondo, transferred to Oak Hill Academy in Virginia (class of 2004), professional basketball player
- Felton Spencer, class of 1986, former NBA basketball player for the Minnesota Timberwolves, Utah Jazz, Orlando Magic and San Antonio Spurs; 6th overall pick in the 1990 NBA draft
- William S. Wallace, class of 1965, four-star general in the United States Army, commanded all U.S. forces during the 2003 invasion of Iraq
- Todd Wellemeyer, class of 1997, Major League Baseball player
- Susan Shields White, class of 1970, 1968 Mexico City U.S. Olympic Bronze medalist in the 100-meter breaststroke event. She was a four-time state champion swimming for Eastern.

== See also ==
- List of public schools in Louisville, Kentucky
