= Grisel Mendoza =

Mexican swimmer

Personal information
- Born: 29 May 1956 (age 70)

Sport
- Sport: Swimming

Grisel Mendoza (born 29 May 1956) is a Mexican former swimmer. She competed in the women's 200 metre butterfly at the 1972 Summer Olympics.
