= Vivienne Smith (swimmer) =

Irish swimmer

Personal information
- Born: 10 November 1952 (age 73) Dublin, Ireland

Sport
- Sport: Swimming

Vivienne Smith (born 10 November 1952) is a female Irish former swimmer. Smith competed in two events at the 1968 Summer Olympics. At the ASA National British Championships she won the 200 metres butterfly title in 1969 and 1970.
