= Kevin Morgan (cyclist) =

Australian cyclist

Personal information
- Born: 3 January 1948 (age 78) Tasmania, Australia

Cycling career
- Sport: Cycling

Kevin Morgan (born 3 January 1948) is a former Australian cyclist. He competed in the individual road race and the team time trial events at the 1968 Summer Olympics.

Morgan set the fastest time in the amateur Goulburn to Sydney Classic in 1968 run in reverse direction from Milperra to Goulburn.
