= Uta Frommater =

German swimmer

Personal information
- Born: December 12, 1948 (age 77) Oldenburg, Allied-occupied Germany

Sport
- Sport: Swimming
Medal record
Representing West Germany
Olympic Games
| Bronze medal – third place | 1968 Mexico City | 4x100 m medley relay |
European Championships
| Silver medal – second place | 1970 Barcelona | 100m breaststroke |
| Bronze medal – third place | 1970 Barcelona | 4x100m medley relay |

Uta Frommater (born 12 December 1948) is a German former swimmer who competed in the 1968 Summer Olympics.
