= Janet Steinbeck =

Australian swimmer

Personal information
- Full name: Janet May Steinbeck (Note: There are several sources that suggest the correct spelling of Steinbeck's given name was "Janette", including Sports-Reference.com)
- Nickname: "Jenny"
- National team: Australia
- Born: 27 February 1951 (age 75) Brisbane, Queensland
- Height: 1.71 m (5 ft 7 in)
- Weight: 64 kg (141 lb)

Sport
- Sport: Swimming
- Strokes: Freestyle
Medal record
Women's swimming
Representing Australia
Olympic Games
Silver medal – second place	1968 Mexico City	4×100 m medley
Commonwealth Games
Silver medal – second place	1966 Kingston	4×110 yd freestyle

Janet May Steinbeck (born 27 February 1951), also known by her married name Janet Murray, was an Australian competitive swimmer of the 1960s who raced internationally in the Olympics and Commonwealth Games, winning two silver medals as a member of Australian relay teams. Steinbeck was primarily a freestyle swimmer.

As a 15-year-old at the 1966 British Empire and Commonwealth Games in Kingston, Jamaica, Steinbeck won a silver medal in the women's 4×110-yard freestyle relay. Swimming the first leg of the four-swimmer relay, she combined with teammates Janice Murphy, Lynette Bell and Marion Smith for a time of 4:11.1, three tenths of a second behind the world-record-setting Canadians, and two tenths ahead of the third-place English team. She also swam in the individual 220-yard backstroke, coming eighth in the event final.

At the 1968 Summer Olympics in Mexico City, Steinbeck won a silver medal as a member of the second-place Australian women's team in the 4×100-metre medley relay. She combined with Lynne Watson, Lyn McClements and Judy Playfair to register a silver medal in the 4×100-metre medley relay, trailing the Americans home by 1.7 seconds. However, it was in Steinbeck's freestyle anchor leg that American Susan Pedersen's used her 59.4-second individual split to solidify the Americans' 1.7-second margin of victory. She was also part of the Australian team that came fourth in the women's 4×100-metre freestyle relay. Individually, she competed in the semifinals of the 100-metre freestyle, and the preliminary heats of the 200-metre freestyle.

== See also ==
- List of Olympic medalists in swimming (women)

== Bibliography ==
- Andrews, Malcolm (2000). Australia at the Olympic Games. Sydney, New South Wales: ABC Books. p. 406. ISBN 0-7333-0884-8.
