= Carmen Gómez =

Colombian swimmer

Personal information
- Born: 17 September 1954 (age 71) Cali, Colombia

Sport
- Sport: Swimming

Carmen Gómez (born 17 September 1954) is a Colombian former swimmer. She competed in two events at the 1968 Summer Olympics.
