= Angelika Kraus =

German swimmer (born 1950)

Personal information
- Born: May 9, 1950 (age 76) Celle, West Germany

Sport
- Sport: Swimming
- Strokes: Backstroke
Medal record
Representing West Germany
Olympic Games
Bronze medal – third place	1968 Mexico City	4x100 m medley relay
European Championships
Bronze medal – third place	1970 Barcelona	4x100m medley relay

Angelika Kraus (born 9 May 1950) is a German former swimmer who competed in the 1968 Summer Olympics and in the 1972 Summer Olympics.
