= Susan Shields =

American swimmer (born 1952)

Personal information
- Full name: Susan Marie Shields -White
- Nickname: "Susie"
- National team: United States
- Born: February 3, 1952 (age 74) Erie, Pennsylvania, U.S.
- Occupations: Swim coach, pre-school teacher
- Height: 5 ft 7 in (1.70 m)
- Weight: 132 lb (60 kg)
- Spouses: James Franklin White, Jr. (1975)
- Children: 2

Sport
- Sport: Swimming
- Strokes: Butterfly
- Club: Plantation Swim Club; Louisville, Kentucky
- Coach: Greg Bobrow (Plantation)
Medal record
Women's swimming
Representing the United States
Olympic Games
Bronze medal – third place	1968 Mexico City	100 m butterfly

Susan Marie Shields (born February 3, 1952), also known by her married name Susan White beginning in 1975, is an American former competition swimmer who competed for Plantation Swim Club and was a 1968 Mexico City Olympic bronze medalist in the 100-meter butterfly. After graduating from Eastern High School in 1970, she earned a degree in Elementary Education, married, and worked as a swim coach. Relocating frequently with her husband and two children, she had a thirty-year career teaching pre-school children.

== Early life and swimming ==
Shields was born the fourth of five siblings in Erie, Pennsylvania, on February 3, 1952, to father John and mother Helen Shields. Swimming twenty miles east of Erie in a local pond in Findley Lake, New York, around 1954, Susan tried to swim with a life jacket, but went head under, prompting the Shields to consider future swim lessons. Susan began competitive swimming at age eight, and by Junior High was training and competing with greater Louisville, Kentucky's Plantation Swim Team. With the family living in nearby Anchorage, Kentucky, a Louisville suburb, Susan attended Louisville's Eastern High School, graduating in 1970.

=== Plantation Swim Club ===
At Plantation Swim Club, Shields was coached by Greg Bobrow, who taught High School Social Studies and coached the swim teams at Louisville's Ballard and Westport High Schools to State Championships. Bobrow coached at Plantation from 1963 to 1976, and began coaching Shields around 1963, continuing through around 1970. Shields did not begin to seriously distinguish herself as a swimmer until age 13, when she became a state champion in the women's 100-yard butterfly event. She earned Kentucky State championship honors in four separate years, in the 200-yard individual medley, and her signature event, the 100 yard butterfly.

Shields would become a High School All American, and would remain undefeated during High School against Kentucky residents in butterfly events. On her way to the 1968 Olympics, Shields swam a 2:29.4 in the 200 butterfly at the July, 1968 Region 6 National Championships at Plantation Swim Club, breaking the former meet record by three seconds, and also won the 100-meter butterfly with a meet record time of 1:07.5, leading the Plantation Women's team to the team championship. The wins earned Shields a place at the AAU National Championships. In early August 1968, Shields finished second in the 100 butterfly with a 1:07 to future 1968 Olympian and rival Elie Daniel at the National AAU Outdoor Championships. During her High School years, prior to her more demanding Olympic workouts, Shields maintained a training program with the Plantation team of around two hours a day in winter and four hours a day in the summer months.

== 1968 Mexico City Olympics ==
At the late August 1968 U.S. Olympic Trials in Los Angeles Shields placed second in the finals of the 100-meter butterfly. Shields and Elie Daniels appeared to touch together, but an electronic clock timed Shields at 1:04.8, only .02 seconds behind the first-place finisher Ellie Daniel of Philadelphia. Shortly before the Olympics, in preparation for the altitude in Mexico City, Shields trained with the U.S. Olympic team at the United States Airforce Academy facilities in Colorado Springs.

Leaving for Mexico City around October 8, Shields represented the United States as a 16-year-old at the 1968 Summer Olympics, where she received a bronze medal for her third-place performance in the women's 100-meter butterfly with a time of 1:06.2, finishing behind Australian Lyn McClements and fellow American Ellie Daniel, against whom she had competed in prior months. American teammate, rival, and silver medalist Daniel finished with a time of 1:05.8, only .4 seconds ahead of Susan. Shields was a close second to leader McClements at the first turn, but was later passed by Daniel. Though not initially favored to win, McClements, who led throughout the close race, took the gold with a 1:05.5.

=== Post-swimming life ===
Shields retired from competitive swimming after graduating from high school in 1970. As there were few collegiate swim teams for women in those years, and no scholarships, Shields decided to focus on her studies. To earn her way, she began swim coaching and giving swim lessons in college while at the University of Louisville. She coached for a period with her former swim team at the Plantation Country Club. Wanting to work with children, she studied for a Bachelor of Art's degree in elementary education at the University of Louisville, according to several sources, but graduated the University of Kentucky in Lexington, Kentucky according to other sources. At 23 and already employed as a childhood educator in Louisville's inner city, Shields married James Franklin White Jr. in April, 1975 in Louisville. James White was then working as a field representative. The couple would have two children.

After her husband James completed his education at Carnegie Mellon University in Pittsburgh, the couple relocated to Toledo, Ohio, around 1980, where Susan continued to work as a teacher. Staying active in the swimming community, she coached youth swimming at Toledo's Sylvania Swim Club, through at least 1988. Each of her two children trained with the Sylvania Club. Continuing her career as an educator, she taught at Olivet Christian Nursery in 1988, and had a long career teaching pre-school children of 4–5 years for just over 30 years. She spent many years taking her two children to swim practices and swim meets.

=== Honors ===
In September, 1968, Kentucky Governor Louie B. Nunn awarded Shields with the honorary title of Kentucky Colonel recognizing her as the first Louisville women to make the U.S. Olympic team. Though unable to attend the ceremony due to a family illness, Shields was inducted into the Kentucky Athletic Hall of Fame on August 24, 1992, and became a member of the Dawahare/Kentucky High School Athletic Association Hall of Fame in 2025. Her status as the first Louisville woman to compete in the Olympics and win a medal made her a strong candidate for both honors.

== See also ==
- List of Olympic medalists in swimming (women)
- List of University of Louisville people
