= Peter McDermott (cyclist) =

Australian cyclist

Personal information
- Born: 11 December 1944 Geelong, Australia
- Died: 25 July 2013 (aged 68)

Cycling career
- Sport: Cycling

Peter McDermott (11 December 1944 – 25 July 2013) was an Australian cyclist. He competed in the individual road race and the team time trial events at the 1968 Summer Olympics.
