= Bill Ronald =

Australian fencer (born 1949)

William (Bill) Ronald
Personal information
- Born: 7 June 1949 (age 77) Katoomba, New South Wales, Australia

Sport
- Sport: Fencing
Medal record
Fencing
Representing Australia
Commonwealth Games
Silver medal – second place	1970 Edinburgh	Men's Team Foil

Bill Ronald (born 7 June 1949) is an Australian former fencer. He competed in three events at the 1968 Summer Olympics. Two years later he went on to compete in three events in the 1970 Commonwealth Games, winning a silver medal in the team foil.

== Early life ==
Bill Ronald went to school at St Andrews Cathedral School, Sydney. He joined St Andrews Cathedral School in Year 3. While at the school he learnt fencing under Tex Clarke.
