= Nam Sang-nam =

South Korean swimmer

Personal information
- Born: 15 August 1947 (age 78) Siheung, South Korea

Sport
- Sport: Swimming
- Strokes: butterfly

Nam Sang-nam (born 15 August 1947) is a South Korean former butterfly swimmer. She competed in two events at the 1968 Summer Olympics.
