= Yasuko Fujii =

Japanese swimmer (born 1950)

Personal information
- Born: 26 July 1950 (age 75) Fukuoka, Japan

Sport
- Sport: Swimming
- Strokes: freestyle, butterfly, medley
Medal record
Representing Japan
Asian Games
Gold medal – first place	1966 Bangkok	200m individual medley

Yasuko Fujii (藤井 康子, Fujii Yasuko; born 26 July 1950) is a Japanese former swimmer. She competed in four events at the 1968 Summer Olympics.
