= Graeme Jennings (fencer) =

Australian fencer

Personal information
- Born: 11 July 1946 Ashfield, Queensland, Australia
- Died: 21 August 1993 (aged 47) Ithaca, New York, United States

Sport
- Sport: Fencing

Graeme Jennings (11 July 1946 – 21 August 1993) was an Australian fencer. He competed at the 1968 Summer Olympics.
