= Middletown, Kentucky =

- City
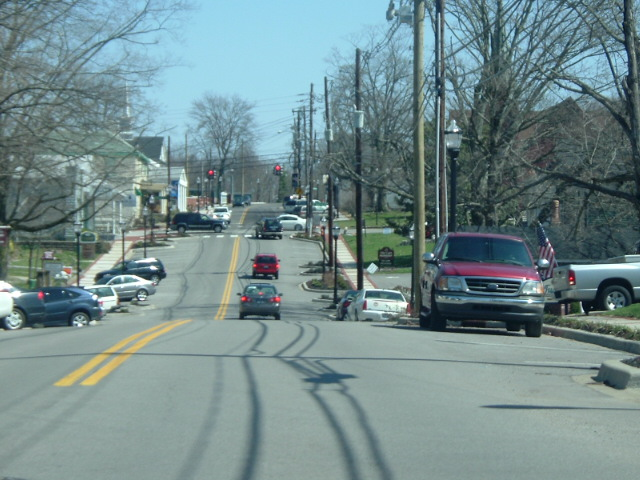
- Main Street in Middletown

- Flag

- Location of Middletown in Jefferson County, Kentucky.

- Location within the state of Kentucky Middletown (the United States)
- Coordinates: 38°14′42″N 85°31′17″W
- Country: United States
- State: Kentucky
- County: Jefferson
- Established: 1797
- Incorporated: 1866
- Reïncorporated: 1979

Area
  - Total: 5.20 sq mi (13.46 km^{2})
  - Land: 5.14 sq mi (13.30 km^{2})
  - Water: 0.062 sq mi (0.16 km^{2})
- Elevation: 705 ft (215 m)

Population (2020)
  - Total: 9,706
  - Density: 1,889.9/sq mi (729.68/km^{2})
- Time zone: UTC-5 (Eastern (EST))
  - Summer (DST): UTC-4 (EDT)
- ZIP codes: 40243, 40253
- Area code: 502
- FIPS code: 21-51978
- GNIS feature ID: 2404253
- Website: middletownky.gov

Middletown is an independent, home rule-class city in Jefferson County, Kentucky, United States, and a suburb of Louisville. As of the 2020 census, Middletown had a population of 9,706. The city is home to the main campus of the largest church in the state (and one of the country's largest Protestant churches), the Southeast Christian Church.

== History ==
The City of Middletown was originally incorporated in 1797 by the Jefferson County Court on 500 acres of land lying on a branch of the forks of Beargrass Creek that originally belonged to Jacob Meyers and Culberth Harrison. Though there is no recorded explanation why the city was named Middletown, it is commonly believed that that name was chosen because the town was in the "middle" of the two older cities of Louisville which was founded June 24, 1778, and Shelbyville, which was founded December 20, 1792. In 1871 the Kentucky General Assembly amended the original charter to increase Middletown's boundaries.

After failing to hold elections and collect taxes after 1919, Circuit Judge Macauley Smith dissolved the city's charter on July 26, 1960, and Middletown lost its 163-year-old city status. The city's charter was restored as a sixth-class city on August 7, 1976, with a commission form of government. On July 15, 1982, this was upgraded to the status of a fourth-class city.

== Geography ==
Middletown is located in northeast Jefferson County, Kentucky near Louisville, Kentucky.

According to the United States Census Bureau, the city has a total area of 5.10 square miles (13.2 km^{2}), of which 5.04 square miles (13.1 km^{2}) is land and 0.061 square miles (0.16 km^{2}) (1.20%) is water.

== Demographics ==
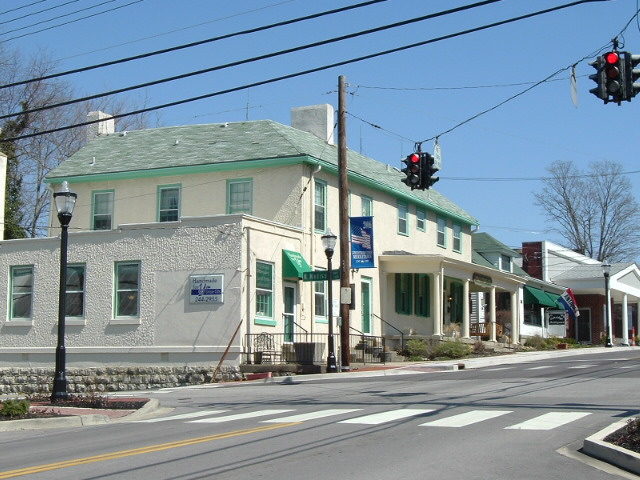
Corner of Madison & Main Street in Middletown

=== 2020 census ===
As of the 2020 census, Middletown had a population of 9,706. The median age was 42.0 years. 19.9% of residents were under the age of 18 and 21.1% of residents were 65 years of age or older. For every 100 females there were 88.1 males, and for every 100 females age 18 and over there were 84.9 males age 18 and over.

100.0% of residents lived in urban areas, while 0.0% lived in rural areas.

There were 4,442 households in Middletown, of which 25.6% had children under the age of 18 living in them. Of all households, 43.0% were married-couple households, 17.3% were households with a male householder and no spouse or partner present, and 32.8% were households with a female householder and no spouse or partner present. About 34.8% of all households were made up of individuals and 15.5% had someone living alone who was 65 years of age or older.

There were 4,772 housing units, of which 6.9% were vacant. The homeowner vacancy rate was 0.8% and the rental vacancy rate was 11.0%.

Racial composition as of the 2020 census
Race	Number	Percent
White	7,427	76.5%
Black or African American	945	9.7%
American Indian and Alaska Native	12	0.1%
Asian	434	4.5%
Native Hawaiian and Other Pacific Islander	3	0.0%
Some other race	169	1.7%
Two or more races	716	7.4%
Hispanic or Latino (of any race)	514	5.3%

=== 2010 census ===
As of the census of 2010, there were 7,218 people, 3,292 households, and 1,966 families living in the city. The population density was 1,414.9 inhabitants per square mile (546.3/km^{2}). There were 3,547 housing units at an average density of 695.3 per square mile (268.5/km^{2}). The racial makeup of the city was 87.1% White (85.1% non-Hispanic), 7.1% African American, 0.11% Native American or Alaska Native, 2.8% Asian, 0.07% Pacific Islander, 0.87% from other races, and 1.9% from two or more races. Hispanics or Latinos of any race were 3.2% of the population.

There were 3,292 households, out of which 26.7% had children under the age of 18 living with them, 45.4% were married couples living together, 11.5% had a female householder with no husband present, 2.9% had a male householder with no wife present, and 40.3% were non-families. 35.4% of all households were made up of individuals, and 16.6% had someone living alone who was 65 years of age or older. The average household size was 2.19 and the average family size was 2.86.

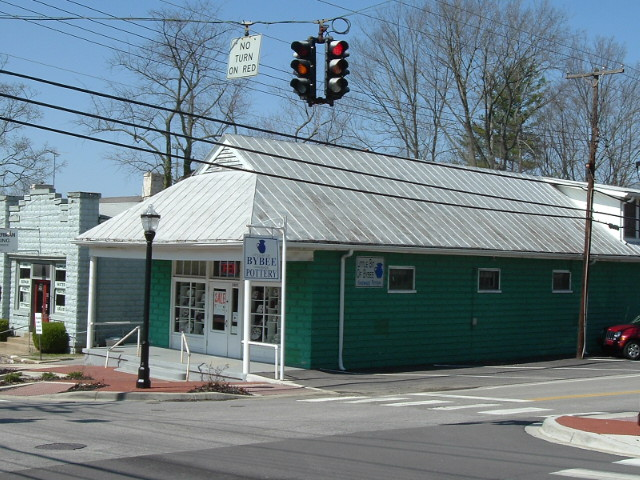
Bybee Pottery on Main Street

The age distribution was 21.4% under 18, 5.7% from 18 to 24, 24.3% from 25 to 44, 30.2% from 45 to 64, and 18.4% who were 65 or older. The median age was 43.8 years. For every 100 females, there were 85.6 males. For every 100 females age 18 and over, there were 80.0 males.

Historical population
Census	Pop.	Note	%±
1870	244		—
1890	302		—
1980	414		—
1990	5,016		1,111.6%
2000	5,744		14.5%
2010	7,218		25.7%
2020	9,706		34.5%
2024 (est.)	9,908		2.1%
U.S. Decennial Census

=== 2000 census ===
As of the census of 2000, there were 5,744 people, 2,391 households, and 1,654 families living in the city. The population density was 1,181.4 inhabitants per square mile (456.1/km^{2}). There were 2,543 housing units at an average density of 523.0 per square mile (201.9/km^{2}). The racial makeup of the city was 90.39% White, 5.54% African American, 0.30% Native American or Alaska Native, 1.44% Asian, 0.09% Pacific Islander, 0.66% from other races, and 1.58% from two or more races. Hispanics or Latinos of any race were 1.50% of the population.

There were 2,391 households, out of which 33.0% had children under the age of 18 living with them, 55.7% were married couples living together, 11.2% had a female householder with no husband present, and 30.8% were non-families. 26.9% of all households were made up of individuals, and 9.5% had someone living alone who was 65 years of age or older. The average household size was 2.40 and the average family size was 2.92.

The age distribution was 24.8% under the age of 18, 6.4% from 18 to 24, 31.1% from 25 to 44, 25.6% from 45 to 64, and 12.1% who were 65 years of age or older. The median age was 38 years. For every 100 females, there were 90.1 males. For every 100 females age 18 and over, there were 84.5 males.

The median income for a household in the city was $53,608, and the median income for a family was $61,667. Males had a median income of $45,417 versus $33,135 for females. The per capita income for the city was $26,660. About 2.3% of families and 4.1% of the population were below the poverty line, including 3.6% of those under age 18 and 8.0% of those age 65 or over.

== Education ==
Public education in Middletown is administered by Jefferson County Public Schools, which operates Eastern High School, Hite Elementary, Middletown Elementary, and Crosby Middle School in the Middletown area. Middletown also has multiple privately funded schools. There is also a branch of the Louisville Free Public Library.

== Government services ==
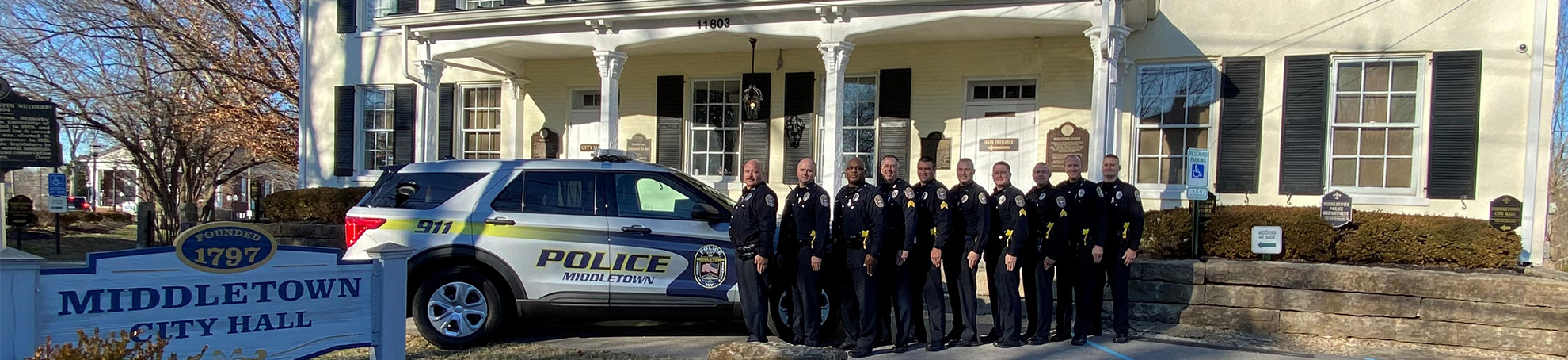
Middletown police in front of city hall

Anchorage-Middletown Fire and EMS operates out of 11 stations to provide fire protection to 90 square miles of the eastern Louisville Metro area. Middletown is also home to a small 24 hour paid police department based out of city hall. Middletown is also home to LMPD's 8th division. EMS is serviced by the fire department.
