= Sue Pedersen =

Canadian physician, a Specialist in Endocrinology & Metabolism

Susie (Sue) Pedersen (born 1977) is a Canadian physician, a Specialist in Endocrinology & Metabolism, and a Diplomate of the American Board of Obesity Medicine. She is a member of the Expert Committee for the Diabetes Canada Clinical Practice Guidelines as a coauthor on the Weight Management Chapter. She is also lead author of the pharmacotherapy chapter of the 2019 Obesity Canada Clinical Practice Guidelines. She published the first randomized controlled trial on a portion control toll for weight loss (Pedersen et al. 2007).

== Education ==
Pedersen earned an MD at the University of Calgary in 2000. She became an internal medicine specialist in 2004, and went on to earn her subspecialty designation as Specialist in Endocrinology & Metabolism at the University of Calgary in 2005.

== Career ==
Pedersen began her endocrinology career with busy practices in both Calgary, AB, and at the Royal University Hospital at the University of Saskatchewan. For the year of 2009, Dr. Sue embarked on a research sabbatical at the University of Copenhagen in 2009 where she was involved in several areas of obesity research with a focus on bariatric surgery. She has a busy clinical practice at C-ENDO Diabetes & Endocrinology Clinic Calgary, and is the lead investigator in their research program in diabetes and obesity.

== Bibliography ==
- Pedersen, SD; Kang, J; Kline, GA (June 2007). "Portion control plate for weight loss in obese patients with type 2 diabetes mellitus: a controlled clinical trial". Arch. Intern. Med. 167: 1277–83. doi:10.1001/archinte.167.12.1277. PMID 17592101.
