= Helga Lindner =

German swimmer (1951–2021)

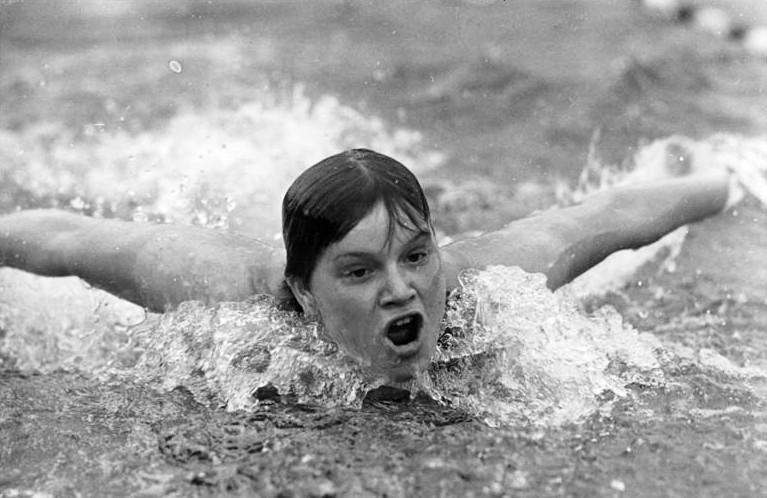
- Lindner in 1968

Medal record

Women's swimming

Representing East Germany

Summer Olympic Games
Silver medal – second place	1968 Mexico City	200 m butterfly

European Championships
Gold medal – first place	1970 Barcelona	4×100 m medley
Gold medal – first place	1970 Barcelona	200 m butterfly
Silver medal – second place	1970 Barcelona	100 m butterfly

Helga Lindner (later Härtel; 5 May 1951 – 3 November 2021) was a German swimmer. Born in Chemnitz, East Germany, she competed for East Germany in the 1968 Summer Olympics.

In 1968 she won a silver medal in the women's 200 m butterfly. Dutch competitor Ada Kok won the gold by one-tenth of a second, then the smallest unit of time in the Olympic swimming contests. She also competed in the 100 m butterfly and, as part of a team of four which included Uta Schmuck, the 4 × 100 m medley relay. The East German team came in fifth.

She participated in the 1970 European Aquatics Championships in Barcelona. She and three other swimmers (as a team) from East Germany won a gold medal in the women's 4×100 m medley relay. She personally won a gold medal in the women's 200 m butterfly. She also won a silver medal in the women's 100 m butterfly.

She later competed for East Germany in the 1972 Summer Olympics, but did not win any medals. She was part of the 200 m butterfly event.

Lindner died on 3 November 2021, at the age of 70.
