= Lynne Watson =

Australian swimmer

Personal information
- Full name: Lynette Pamella Watson
- Nickname: "Lynne"
- National team: Australia
- Born: 22 November 1952 (age 73) Perth, Western Australia
- Height: 1.72 m (5 ft 8 in)
- Weight: 60 kg (132 lb)

Sport
- Sport: Swimming
- Strokes: Backstroke, freestyle
Medal record
Women's swimming
Representing Australia
Olympic Games
Silver medal – second place	1968 Mexico City	4×100 m medley
British Commonwealth Games
Gold medal – first place	1970 Edinburgh	100 m backstroke
Gold medal – first place	1970 Edinburgh	200 m backstroke
Gold medal – first place	1970 Edinburgh	4×100 m freestyle
Gold medal – first place	1970 Edinburgh	4×100 m medley
Silver medal – second place	1970 Edinburgh	100 m freestyle

Lynnette Pamela Watson (born 22 November 1952), known after marriage as Lynne Bates, is an Australian backstroke swimmer of the 1960s, who won a silver medal in the 4×100-metre medley relay at the 1968 Summer Olympics in Mexico City, narrowly missing two more medals.

Coming from Western Australia, Watson combined with Janet Steinbeck, Lyn McClements and Judy Playfair to register a silver medal in the 4×100-metre medley relay, trailing the Americans home by 1.7 seconds. Competing in the individual 100-metre freestyle, Watson was eliminated in the semifinals. She placed sixth and fourth in the 100-metre and 200-metre backstroke respectively. She also finished fourth as part of the 4×100-metre freestyle relay team. Two years later at the 1970 Commonwealth Games, Watson won four gold medals in both backstroke events and in the 4×100-metre freestyle and medley relays, as well as a silver in the 100-metre freestyle. She later became a team administrator for Australia at the 1992 Summer Olympics in Barcelona.

== See also ==
- List of Olympic medalists in swimming (women)
- List of Commonwealth Games medallists in swimming (women)
