= Nel Bos =

Dutch swimmer (born 1947)

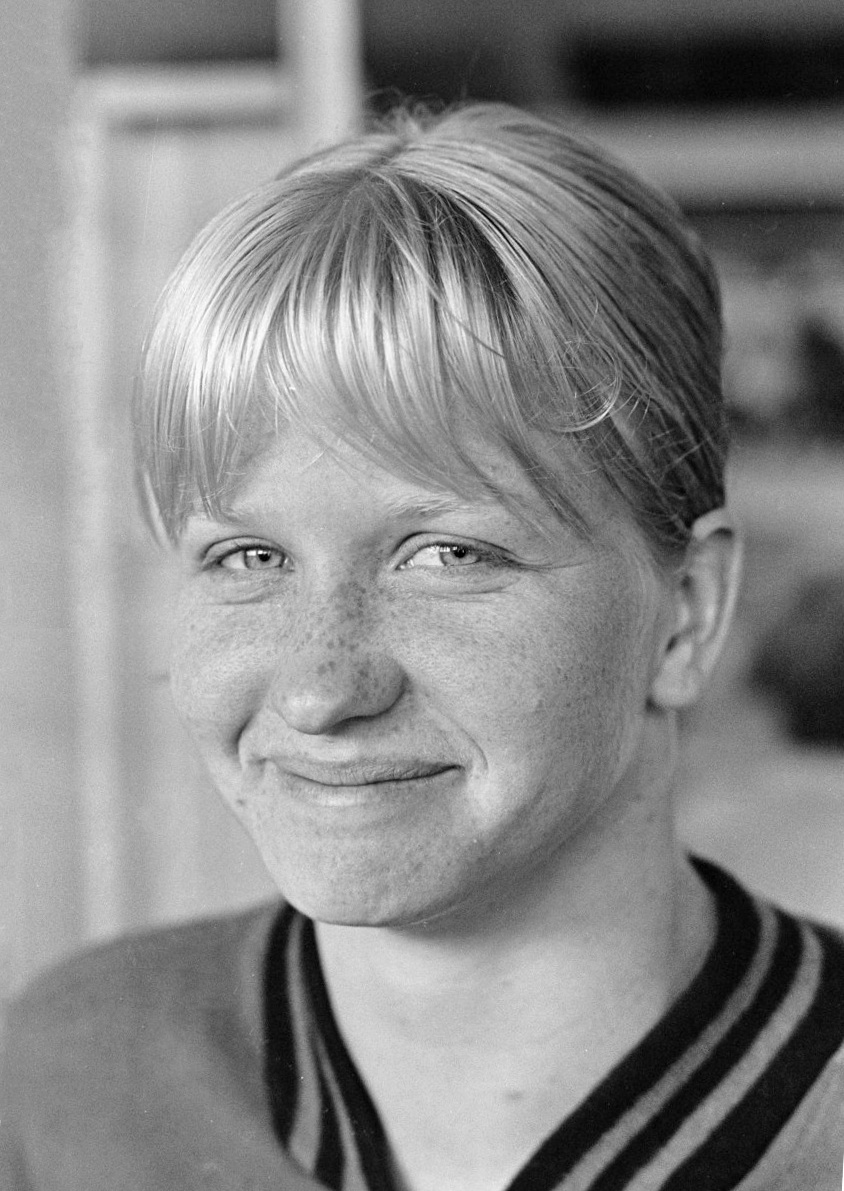
- Nel Bos in 1967

Personal information
- Born: 23 November 1947 (age 78) Willemstad, Curaçao
- Height: 1.70 m (5 ft 7 in)
- Weight: 58 kg (128 lb)

Sport
- Sport: Swimming
- Club: ADZ, Amsterdam

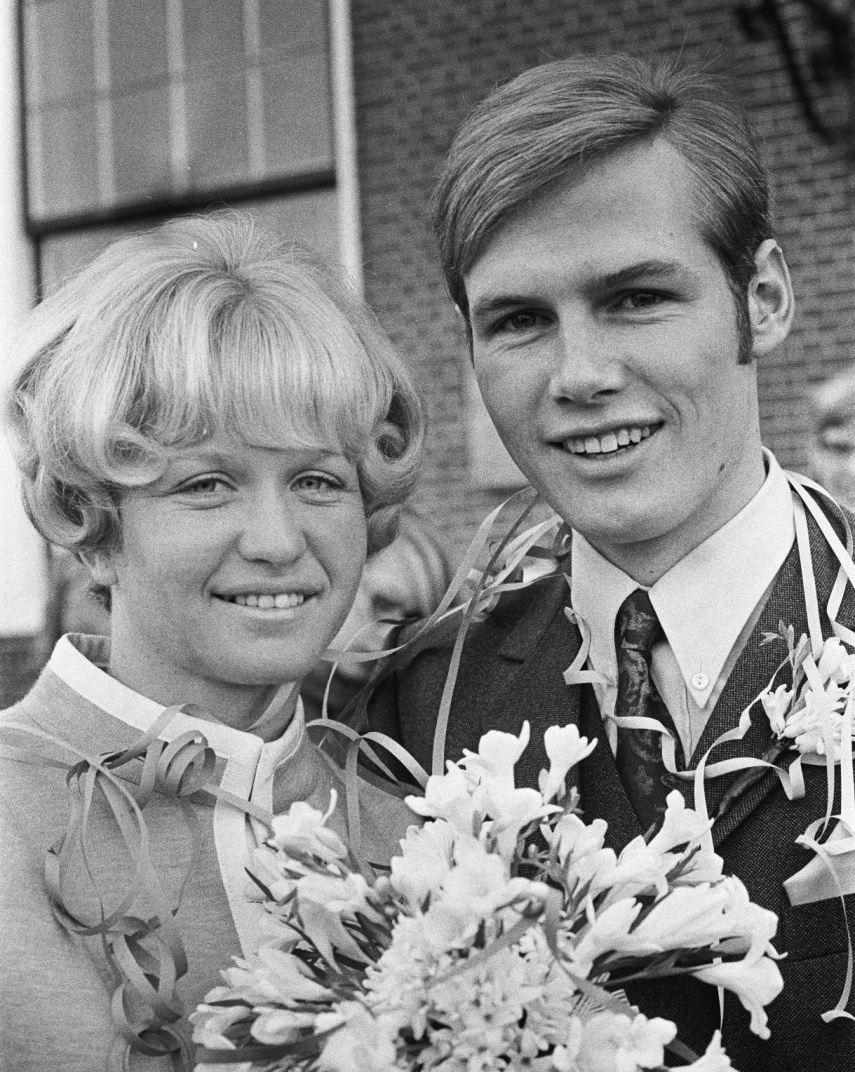
Retired Nel Bos is marrying R. Plu on 20 December 1969

Petronella Johanna Maria "Nel" Bos (born 23 November 1947) is a retired swimmer from the Netherlands. She competed at the 1968 Summer Olympics in the 100 m freestyle, 100 m butterfly, 4 × 100 m freestyle relay and 4 × 100 m medley relay and finished in seventh place in the last event.
