= Pauline Gray =

Australian swimmer

Personal information
- Born: 9 April 1951 (age 75) Melbourne, Australia

Sport
- Sport: Swimming
- Strokes: butterfly

Pauline Gray (born 9 April 1951) is an Australian former swimmer. She competed in two events at the 1968 Summer Olympics.
