= Christine Strübing =

East German swimmer

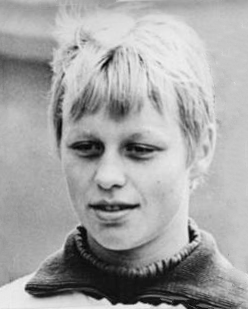
- Christine Strübing in 1968

Personal information
- Born: 30 March 1952 (age 74) Rostock, Germany
- Height: 1.72 m (5 ft 8 in)
- Weight: 62 kg (137 lb)

Sport
- Sport: Swimming
- Club: SC Empor Rostock

Christine Strübing (born 30 March 1952) was an East German swimmer. She competed at the 1968 Summer Olympics in the 100 m and 200 m butterfly events, but failed to reach the finals.

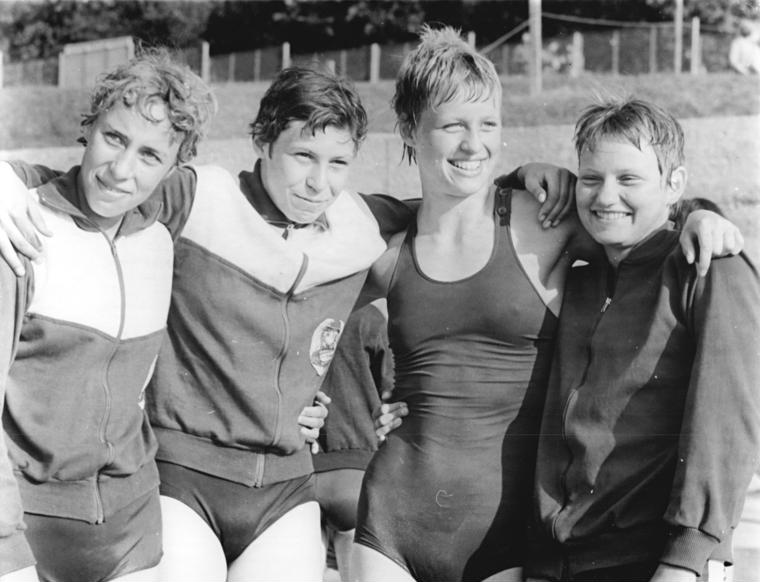
Christine Strübing second from right in 1970
