= Judy Playfair =

Australian swimmer

Personal information
- Full name: Judith White Playfair
- Nickname: Judy
- National team: Australia
- Born: 14 September 1953 (age 72) Sydney
- Height: 1.62 m (5 ft 4 in)
- Weight: 57 kg (126 lb)

Sport
- Sport: Swimming
- Strokes: Breaststroke
- Club: Bondi Ladies SC
Medal record
Women's swimming
Representing Australia
Olympic Games
Silver medal – second place	1968 Mexico City	4×100 m medley

Judith White Playfair (born 14 September 1953) is an Australian breaststroke swimmer of the 1960s, who won a silver medal in the 4×100-metre medley relay at the 1968 Summer Olympics in Mexico City.

== Swimming career ==
Playfair was born in Rose Bay, Sydney. She learned to swim at the age of four, at Watson's Bay Baths, and continued to train there two to three times a day from an early age. From 1965 to 1969, she was the New South Wales Junior and then senior breaststroke champion and record holder. She was the Australian 100m and 200m breaststroke champion from 1967 to 1969 and held both Australian and Commonwealth records.

In 1968, still aged 14, she was selected to represent Australia at the 1968 Mexico City Olympics. Playfair combined with Janet Steinbeck, Lyn McClements and Lynne Watson to register a silver medal in the 4×100-metre medley relay, trailing the Americans home by 1.7 seconds. She was eliminated in the semi-finals and heats of the 100-metre and 200-metre backstroke events respectively. She was away from home and school for three months and had her 15th birthday while overseas.

She swam at the Australian National titles with an injury and was not selected for the 1970 Commonwealth Games squad at which point she retired from competitive swimming.

== Professional career ==
Playfair studied arts and teaching at the University of Sydney. She taught Physical Education and HSIE at a number of comprehensive public schools in Sydney and in 2003 became the deputy principal of Canterbury Girls High School. She retired from teaching in 2009 and then worked at the University of Sydney.

== Personal ==
Playfair is the granddaughter of the Sydney businessman, politician and soldier Thomas Alfred John Playfair. She attended Kambala School for her entire schooling. She is the aunt of New South Wales King's Cup winning and Australian representative rower Hamish Playfair.

== See also ==
- List of Olympic medalists in swimming (women)
