= Sandra Whittleston =

New Zealand swimmer (born 1951)

Personal information
- Born: 2 February 1951 (age 75) Napier, New Zealand

Sport
- Sport: Swimming

Sandra Whittleston (born 2 February 1951) is a New Zealand former swimmer. She was coached by New Zealand's first professional swimming coach, Bert Cotterill, and she competed in three events at the 1968 Summer Olympics.
