= Heike Nagel =

German swimmer (born 1946)

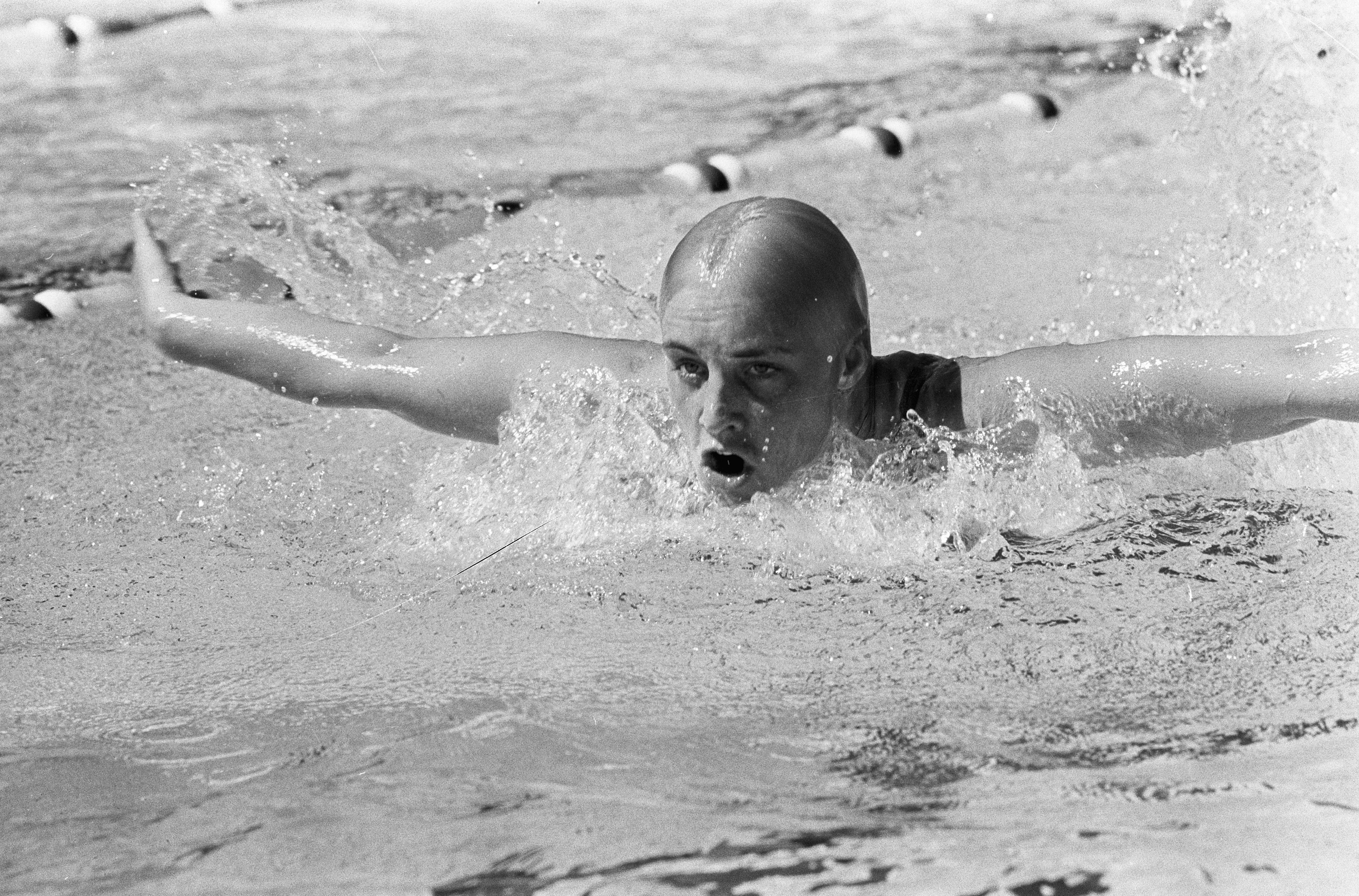
- Heike Hustede in 1966

Personal information
- Born: 16 January 1946 (age 80) Osnabrück, Germany
- Height: 1.70 m (5 ft 7 in)
- Weight: 64 kg (141 lb)

Sport
- Sport: Swimming
- Club: DSW 1912, Darmstadt
Medal record
Representing West Germany
Olympic Games
Bronze medal – third place	1968 Mexico City	4×100 m medley
European Championships
Silver medal – second place	1966 Utrecht	100 m butterfly
Bronze medal – third place	1970 Barcelona	4×100 m medley

Heike Nagel (née Hustede, born 16 January 1946) is a German former swimmer who competed in the 1964, 1968 and 1972 Summer Olympics. She won a bronze medal in the 4 × 100 m medley relay in 1968, and three times reached the finals in individual butterfly events in 1964 and 1968. She also won two medals at the European championships in 1966 and 1970.
