= Ellie Daniel =

American swimmer (born 1950)

Personal information
- Full name: Eleanor Suzanne Daniel
- Nickname: "Ellie"
- National team: United States
- Born: June 11, 1950 (age 76) Philadelphia, Pennsylvania, U.S.
- Height: 5 ft 8 in (1.73 m)
- Weight: 143 lb (65 kg)

Sport
- Sport: Swimming
- Strokes: Butterfly
- Club: Arden Hills Swim Club, Vesper Boat Club
- College team: University of Pennsylvania; 1976
- Coach: Mary Freeman Kelly; George Breen
Medal record
Women's swimming
Representing the United States
Olympic Games
| Gold medal – first place | 1968 Mexico City | 4x100 m medley |
| Silver medal – second place | 1968 Mexico City | 100 m butterfly |
| Bronze medal – third place | 1968 Mexico City | 200 m butterfly |
| Bronze medal – third place | 1972 Munich | 200 m butterfly |
Pan American Games
| Gold medal – first place | 1967 Winnipeg | 100 m butterfly |
| Gold medal – first place | 1967 Winnipeg | 4x100 m medley |
Universiade
| Bronze medal – third place | 1970 Turin | 100m butterfly |

Eleanor Suzanne Daniel (born June 11, 1950), is an American former competition swimmer, four-time Olympic medalist, and former world record-holder.

== Early age group swimming ==
Coach Mary Freeman Kelly

In her earlier years, Daniel trained with Hall of Fame Coach Mary Freeman Kelly at the Vesper Boat Club team in Philadelphia. She started on the "B" team, swimming at the aquarium, underneath the art museum. The following year, she made the "A" team, which practiced at the University of Pennsylvania's Weightman Hall pool.

Later, when her family moved to California around 1967, she swam with Hall of Fame Coach Sherm Chavoor at Arden Hills Swim Club in Sacramento. In her second year of competition, she came in eighth in the 1,500-meter freestyle at the AAU national championships. Afterward, she switched to the butterfly stroke, which came naturally to her because she was double-jointed in her back and her strength was in her shoulders, and won seven national championships. Around 1967, she graduated Abington Senior High in Abington, Pennsylvania.

== 1967 Pan Am games ==
At the 1967 Pan American Games in Winnipeg, Manitoba, she won gold medals in the 100-meter butterfly (1:05.24), and swimming the butterfly leg in the 4×100-meter medley relay with her teammates Kendis Moore (backstroke), Catie Ball (breaststroke), and Wendy Fordyce (freestyle) (4:30.0).

== 1968 Olympics ==
Daniel represented the United States at the 1968 Summer Olympics in Mexico City, where she competed in three events under U.S. Olympic Head Coach Sherm Chavoor, who had coached her at the Arden Hills Club. She received a gold medal by swimming the butterfly leg for the winning U.S. team in the women's 4×100-meter medley relay, together with teammates Kaye Hall (backstroke), Catie Ball (breaststroke), and Sue Pedersen (freestyle), a teammate from Arden Hills. The American women set a new Olympic record of 4:28.3, defeating the Australians (4:30.0) and West Germans (4:36.4). In individual competition, she won a silver medal in the 100-meter butterfly, and a bronze medal in the 200-meter butterfly.

== 1972 Olympics ==
Daniel received a bronze medal in 200-meter butterfly at the 1972 Summer Olympics in Munich, Germany. She also competed in the 100-meter butterfly, finishing sixth in the event final.

She held the 200-meter butterfly (long course) world record (2:18.4) from August 1971 to August 1972. In her swimming career, she was a national champion seven times and took 14 individual American and/or national records.

== College ==
Daniel is a 1976 graduate of the University of Pennsylvania, and trained with both the Women's team and Penn's Men swim team under Hall of Fame Coach George Breen, a former Olympian. She was a standout on the Women's team. She had a double major in psychology and elementary education, and later attended law school. She is currently a prosecutor with the Los Angeles County District Attorney's office.

== Swimming administration ==
She was an executive member of the U.S. Olympic Committee, and the U.S. Olympic Committee's Athletes Advisory Council. She was a member of the Speakers' Bureau for the Olympic Organizing Committee before the 1984 Los Angeles Summer Games.

== Honors ==
Daniel was inducted into the International Swimming Hall of Fame as an "Honor Swimmer" in 1997. She is also a member of the University of Pennsylvania Athletic Hall of Fame.

== See also ==
- List of Olympic medalists in swimming (women)
- List of University of Pennsylvania people
- World record progression 200 metres butterfly
- World record progression 4 × 100 metres medley relay
