= Ada Kok =

Dutch swimmer (born 1947)

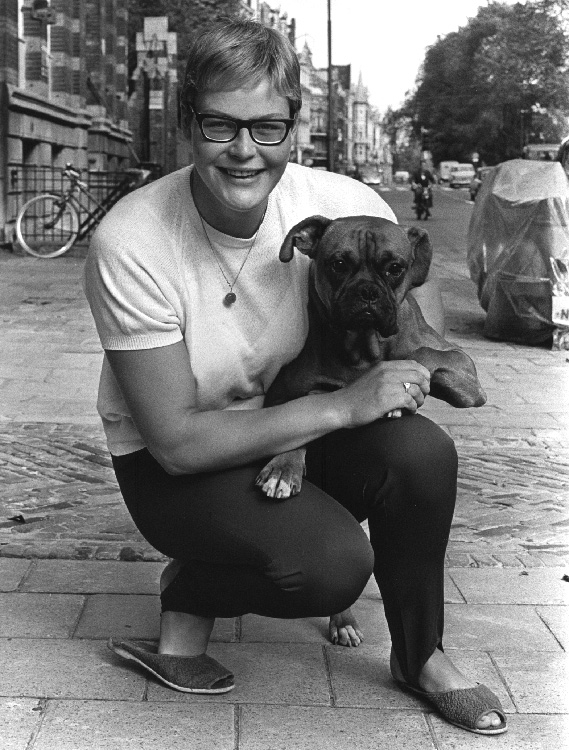

Personal information
- Full name: Aagje Kok
- National team: Netherlands
- Born: 6 June 1947 (age 79) Amsterdam, Netherlands
- Height: 1.83 m (6 ft 0 in)

Sport
- Sport: Swimming
- Strokes: Butterfly
Medal record
Women's swimming
Representing the Netherlands
Olympic Games
Gold medal – first place	1968 Mexico City	200 m butterfly
Silver medal – second place	1964 Tokyo	100 m butterfly
Silver medal – second place	1964 Tokyo	4×100 m medley
European Championships
Gold medal – first place	1962 Leipzig	100 m butterfly
Gold medal – first place	1966 Utrecht	100 m butterfly
Gold medal – first place	1966 Utrecht	4×100 m medley
Silver medal – second place	1962 Leipzig	4×100 m medley
Silver medal – second place	1966 Utrecht	400 m freestyle

Aagje ("Ada") Kok (born 6 June 1947, in Amsterdam, North Holland) is a Dutch former swimmer who ranked among the world's best in the butterfly stroke category during the 1960s.

Her international career started in 1962 when, at the age of fifteen, she took the European title in the 100 m butterfly in Leipzig. She was also part of the silver 4×100 m medley relay team. At the Tokyo Olympics two years later she finished second in both events. She was also good at freestyle swimming, which showed when she took second place in the 400 metres at the 1966 European Championships in Utrecht. In the same tournament she also won the 100 m butterfly and the 4×100 m relay. She achieved nine world records between 1963 and 1967 in the 100 m and 200 m (not introduced until later).

Kok reached her peak at the 1968 Summer Olympics in Mexico City. She won the gold medal in the 200 meter butterfly race in a time of 2:24.7, beating the East German Helga Lindner by 0.1 seconds. The 100 meter butterfly race in that Olympic Games ended in disappointment for her, when she did not feel well beforehand, and finished in fourth place..

Normally after a race there were always people around me. This time nobody. Nobody. I suddenly felt so abandoned and alone. Then under the shower I lost control and cried my eyes out.' For the 200 meter final, I was so stiff and rigid that I couldn't even see myself getting my tracksuit bottoms off. My fingers couldn't get the zipper undone. An official had to help me with it. I don't remember anything now of the first hundred metres. It's a black hole. Well anyway, after 150 meters I was in the lead. Twenty meters from the finish, I saw someone (Lindner) catching up with me. I thought, "Jesus, no, she is not getting past me." Fortunately, I was able to keep in front.

In her memoirs written by Henk Lichtenveldt, she stated:

Approaching the podium of honor I felt like I was walking on clouds. I had to contain myself because I wanted to rush over the stands skipping like a foal. This was the crowning moment in a great swimming career.

== See also ==
- List of members of the International Swimming Hall of Fame
- World record progression 100 metres butterfly
- World record progression 200 metres butterfly

Records
Preceded by (United States) Kathy Ellis	Women's 100 metre butterfly world record holder (long course); 1 September 1963 – 16 October 1964	Succeeded by (United States) Sharon Stouder
Preceded by (United States) Sharon Stouder	Women's 100 metre butterfly world record holder (long course); 14 August 1965 – 20 August 1970	Succeeded by (United States) Alice Jones
Preceded by (United States) Kenis Moore	Women's 200 metre butterfly world record holder (long course); 21 August 1965 – 11 July 1970	Succeeded by (United States) Karen Moe
Awards
Preceded by Sjoukje Dijkstra	Dutch Sportswoman of the Year; 1965, 1966	Succeeded by Stien Kaiser
Preceded by Stien Kaiser	Dutch Sportswoman of the Year; 1968	Succeeded by Maria Gommers
