= Susan Pedersen (swimmer) =

American swimmer (born 1953)

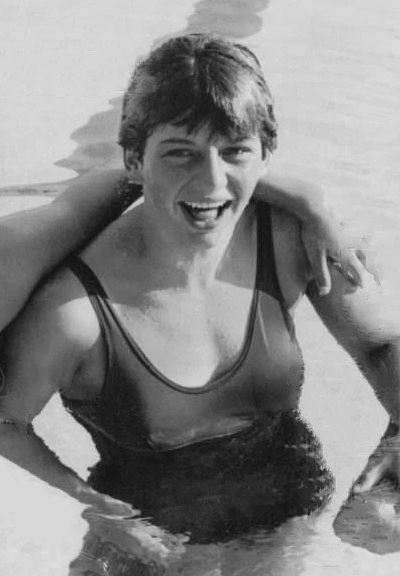
- Pedersen in 1967

Personal information
- Full name: Susan Jane Pedersen
- Nickname: "Sue"
- National team: United States
- Born: October 16, 1953 (age 72) Sacramento, California, U.S.
- Height: 5 ft 9 in (1.75 m)
- Weight: 154 lb (70 kg)

Sport
- Sport: Swimming
- Strokes: Freestyle
- Club: Arden Hills Swim Club
- Coach: Sherm Chavoor
Medal record
Representing the United States
Olympic Games
| Gold medal – first place | 1968 Mexico City | 4×100 m medley |
| Gold medal – first place | 1968 Mexico City | 4×100 m freestyle |
| Silver medal – second place | 1968 Mexico City | 100 m freestyle |
| Silver medal – second place | 1968 Mexico City | 200 m medley |
Pan American Games
| Silver medal – second place | 1967 Winnipeg | 800 m freestyle |
| Silver medal – second place | 1967 Winnipeg | 200 m medley |
| Silver medal – second place | 1967 Winnipeg | 400 m medley |

Susan "Sue" Jane Pedersen (born October 16, 1953), also known by her married name Susan Pankey, is an American former competition swimmer, four-time Olympic medalist, and former world record-holder in two events.

As a 15-year-old, Pedersen represented the United States at the 1968 Summer Olympics in Mexico City, where she received a total of four medals. She won a gold medal as a member of the winning U.S. team in the women's 4×100-meter medley relay, and another swimming for the first-place U.S. team in the women's 4×100-meter freestyle relay, while setting Olympic records in both. Individually, she received silver medals for her second-place finishes in the women's 100-meter freestyle (1:00.3), and women's 200-meter individual medley.

She held the world record in the 200-meter freestyle (2:09.5) from July 6, 1968, to August 2, 1968. She was also a member of world-record U.S. teams in the 4×100-meter medley relay and the 4×200-meter freestyle relay.

Pedersen was inducted into the International Swimming Hall of Fame as an "Honor Swimmer" in 1995.

== See also ==
- List of members of the International Swimming Hall of Fame
- List of Olympic medalists in swimming (women)
- World record progression 200 metres freestyle
- World record progression 4 × 100 metres medley relay
