= Swimming at the 1968 Summer Olympics – Women's 200 metre individual medley =

Women's 200 metre individual medley at the Games of the XIX Olympiad
- Venue: Alberca Olímpica Francisco Márquez
- Dates: 20 October 1968 (heats & final)
- Competitors: 39 from 26 nations
- Winning time: 2:24.7 OR

Medalists
1st place, gold medalist(s)		Claudia Kolb	United States
2nd place, silver medalist(s)		Susan Pedersen	United States
3rd place, bronze medalist(s)		Jan Henne	United States

The women's 200 metre individual medley event at the 1968 Summer Olympics took place 20 October. This swimming event used medley swimming. Because an Olympic size swimming pool is 50 metres long, this race consisted of four lengths of the pool. The first length was swum using the butterfly stroke, the second with the backstroke, the third length in breaststroke, and the fourth freestyle. Unlike other events using freestyle, swimmers could not use butterfly, backstroke, or breaststroke for the freestyle leg; most swimmers use the front crawl in freestyle events anyway.

== Results ==
=== Heats ===
Heat 1

Rank	Athlete	Country	Time	Note
1	Sabine Steinbach	East Germany	2:33.2	
2	Jan Henne	United States	2:33.9	
3	Sue Eddy	Australia	2:36.6	
4	Yvonne Tobis	Israel	2:41.0	
5	Nelly Syro	Colombia	2:55.7	
6	Liana Vicens	Puerto Rico	2:57.0	

Heat 2

Rank	Athlete	Country	Time	Note
1	Tui Shipston	New Zealand	2:35.5	
2	Dianna Rickard	Australia	2:36.0	
3	Consuelo Changanaqui	Peru	2:40.0	
4	Heli Matzdorf	West Germany	2:42.1	
5	Felicia Ospitaletche	Uruguay	2:47.8	
6	Donatella Ferracuti	El Salvador	2:48.6	

Heat 3

Rank	Athlete	Country	Time	Note
1	Yoshimi Nishigawa	Japan	2:31.5	
2	Pru Chapman	New Zealand	2:42.1	
3	Hedy García	Philippines	2:42.3	
4	Ellen Ingvadóttir	Iceland	2:43.1	
5	Hrafnhildur Guðmundsdóttir	Iceland	2:44.3	
6	Ruth Apt	Uruguay	2:45.9	

Heat 4

Rank	Athlete	Country	Time	Note
1	Claudia Kolb	United States	2:28.8	
2	Larisa Zakharova	Soviet Union	2:34.6	
3	Shelagh Ratcliffe	Great Britain	2:34.9	
4	Kirsten Strange-Campbell	Denmark	2:39.4	
5	Eva Sigg	Finland	2:41.0	
6	Lidia Ramírez	Mexico	2:42.6	
7	María Moreño	El Salvador	2:51.1	

Heat 5

Rank	Athlete	Country	Time	Note
1	Marianne Seydel	East Germany	2:32.8	
2	Sue Pedersen	United States	2:33.2	
3	Danièle Dorléans	France	2:39.5	
4	Carla Galle	Belgium	2:40.9	
5	Kristina Moir	Puerto Rico	2:42.8	
6	Carmen Ferracuti	El Salvador	2:44.7	
7	Olga de Angulo	Colombia	2:48.7	

Heat 6

Rank	Athlete	Country	Time	Note
1	Hennie Penterman	Netherlands	2:36.7	
2	Judit Turóczy	Hungary	2:38.8	
3	Márta Egerváry	Hungary	2:40.7	
4	Mariya Nikolova	Bulgaria	2:40.8	
5	Pilar von Carsten	Spain	2:41.7	
6	Helmi Boxberger	West Germany	2:45.2	
7	Shen Bao-ni	Taiwan	2:48.1	

=== Final ===
Rank	Athlete	Country	Time	Notes
1	Claudia Kolb	United States	2:24.7	OR
2	Susan Pedersen	United States	2:28.8	
3	Jan Henne	United States	2:31.4	
4	Sabine Steinbach	East Germany	2:31.4	
5	Yoshimi Nishigawa	Japan	2:33.7	
6	Marianne Seydel	East Germany	2:33.7	
7	Larisa Zakharova	Soviet Union	2:37.0	
	Shelagh Ratcliffe	Great Britain	DQ	

Key: DQ = Disqualified, OR = Olympic record
