= Swimming at the 1968 Summer Olympics – Women's 400 metre individual medley =

Women's 400 metre individual medley at the Games of the XIX Olympiad
- Venue: Alberca Olímpica Francisco Márquez
- Dates: 24 October 1968 (heat); 25 October 1968 (final)
- Competitors: 28 from 19 nations
- Winning time: 5:08.5 OR

Medalists
1st place, gold medalist(s)		Claudia Kolb	United States
2nd place, silver medalist(s)		Lynn Vidali	United States
3rd place, bronze medalist(s)		Sabine Steinbach	East Germany

The women's 400 metre individual medley event at the 1968 Summer Olympics took place on 24–25 October. This swimming event used medley swimming. Because an Olympic size swimming pool is 50 metres long, this race consisted of eight lengths of the pool. The first two lengths were swum using the butterfly stroke, the second pair with the backstroke, the third pair of lengths in breaststroke, and the final two were freestyle. Unlike other events using freestyle, swimmers could not use butterfly, backstroke, or breaststroke for the freestyle leg; most swimmers use the front crawl in freestyle events.

== Results ==
=== Heats ===
Heat 1

Rank	Athlete	Country	Time	Note
1	Sue Pedersen	United States	5:26.4	
2	Larisa Zakharova	Soviet Union	5:38.6	
3	Hennie Penterman	Netherlands	5:38.8	
4	Carla Galle	Belgium	5:55.2	
5	Olga de Angulo	Colombia	6:00.6	

Heat 2

Rank	Athlete	Country	Time	Note
1	Sabine Steinbach	East Germany	5:31.3	
2	Eva Sigg	Finland	5:37.3	
3	Sue Eddy	Australia	5:42.2	
4	Norma Amezcua	Mexico	5:47.9	
5	Ruth Apt	Uruguay	6:04.5	
6	Shen Bao-ni	Taiwan	6:21.5	

Heat 3

Rank	Athlete	Country	Time	Note
1	Lynn Vidali	United States	5:28.9	
2	Shelagh Ratcliffe	Great Britain	5:33.2	
3	Laura Vaca	Mexico	5:33.7	
4	Tamara Oynick	Mexico	5:48.4	
5	Kirsten Strange-Campbell	Denmark	5:59.0	

Heat 4

Rank	Athlete	Country	Time	Note
1	Marianne Seydel	East Germany	5:30.9	
2	Tui Shipston	New Zealand	5:33.7	
3	Eva Wittke	East Germany	5:40.6	
4	Mariya Nikolova	Bulgaria	5:45.2	
5	Patricia Olano	Colombia	5:52.6	
6	Yvonne Tobis	Israel	5:53.8	
7	Hedy García	Philippines	6:07.3	

Heat 5

Rank	Athlete	Country	Time	Note
1	Claudia Kolb	United States	5:17.2	
2	Dianna Rickard	Australia	5:37.8	
3	Heli Matzdorf	West Germany	5:50.5	
4	Consuelo Changanaqui	Peru	5:52.2	
5	Nelly Syro	Colombia	6:13.1	

=== Final ===
Rank	Athlete	Country	Time	Notes
1	Claudia Kolb	United States	5:08.5	OR
2	Lynn Vidali	United States	5:22.2	
3	Sabine Steinbach	East Germany	5:25.3	
4	Sue Pedersen	United States	5:25.8	
5	Shelagh Ratcliffe	Great Britain	5:30.5	
6	Marianne Seydel	East Germany	5:32.0	
7	Tui Shipston	New Zealand	5:34.6	
8	Laura Vaca	Mexico	5:35.7	

Key: OR = Olympic record
