= Swimming at the 1972 Summer Olympics – Women's 200 metre individual medley =

Women's 200 metre individual medley at the Games of the XX Olympiad
- Venue: Olympia Schwimmhalle
- Date: 28 August 1972 (heats & final)
- Competitors: 44 from 26 nations
- Winning time: 2:23.07 WR

Medalists
1st place, gold medalist(s)		Shane Gould	Australia
2nd place, silver medalist(s)		Kornelia Ender	East Germany
3rd place, bronze medalist(s)		Lynn Vidali	United States

The women's 200 metre individual medley event at the 1972 Olympic Games took place August 28. This swimming event used medley swimming. Because an Olympic size swimming pool is 50 metres long, this race consisted of four lengths of the pool. The first length was swum using the butterfly stroke, the second with the backstroke, the third length in breaststroke, and the fourth freestyle. Unlike other events using freestyle, swimmers could not use butterfly, backstroke, or breaststroke for the freestyle leg; most swimmers use the front crawl in freestyle events anyway.

== Results ==
=== Heats ===
Heat 1

Rank	Athlete	Country	Time	Notes
1	Nina Petrova	Soviet Union	2:27.20	
2	Anita Zarnowiecki	Sweden	2:29.08	
3	Gail Neall	Australia	2:29.64	
4	Karen James	Canada	2:31.25	
5	Debra Cain	Australia	2:31.82	
6	Eleni Avlonitou	Greece	2:39.10	
7	Patricia López	Argentina	2:42.08	

Heat 2

Rank	Athlete	Country	Time	Notes
1	Evelyn Stolze	East Germany	2:25.45	
2	Leslie Cliff	Canada	2:25.59	
3	Jaroslava Slavíčková	Czechoslovakia	2:27.33	
4	Hennie Penterman	Netherlands	2:28.99	
5	Éva Kiss	Hungary	2:32.68	
6	Hsu Yue-yun	Chinese Taipei	2:35.93	
7	María Ballesteros	Mexico	2:37.00	

Heat 3

Rank	Athlete	Country	Time	Notes
1	Jenny Bartz	United States	2:25.83	
2	Brigitte Schuchardt	East Germany	2:30.04	
3	Martha Nelson	Canada	2:30.51	
4	Shelagh Ratcliffe	Great Britain	2:31.04	
5	Gerda Lassooij	Netherlands	2:32.92	
6	Eva Sigg	Finland	2:33.61	
7	Gisela Cerezo	Venezuela	2:35.34	
8	Laura Vaca	Mexico	2:34.35	DQ

Heat 4

Rank	Athlete	Country	Time	Notes
1	Kornelia Ender	East Germany	2:25.39	
2	Carolyn Woods	United States	2:26.98	
3	Susan Hunter	New Zealand	2:30.29	
4	Wijda Mazereeuw	Netherlands	2:32.59	
5	Avis Willington	Great Britain	2:32.64	
6	Maria Isabel Guerra	Brazil	2:32.95	
7	Kirsten Strange-Campbell	Denmark	2:33.15	

Heat 5

Rank	Athlete	Country	Time	Notes
1	Lynn Vidali	United States	2:24.92	
2	Yoshimi Nishigawa	Japan	2:26.61	
3	Birutė Užkuraitytė	Soviet Union	2:31.11	
4	Susan Richardson	Great Britain	2:31.24	
5	Judit Turóczy	Hungary	2:32.63	
6	Trine Krogh	Norway	2:36.27	
7	Felicia Ospitaletche	Uruguay	2:37.69	

Heat 6

Rank	Athlete	Country	Time	Notes
1	Shane Gould	Australia	2:26.44	
2	Ágnes Kaczander-Kiss	Hungary	2:28.05	
3	Yukari Takemoto	Japan	2:29.41	
4	Susanne Niesner	Switzerland	2:30.87	
5	Karin Bormann	West Germany	2:31.19	
6	Helmi Boxberger	West Germany	2:33.71	
7	Roselina Angee	Colombia	2:45.46	
8	Ong Mei Lin	Malaysia	2:48.13	

=== Final ===
Rank	Athlete	Country	Time	Notes
1	Shane Gould	Australia	2:23.07	WR
2	Kornelia Ender	East Germany	2:23.59	
3	Lynn Vidali	United States	2:24.06	
4	Jenny Bartz	United States	2:24.55	
5	Leslie Cliff	Canada	2:24.83	
6	Evelyn Stolze	East Germany	2:25.90	
7	Yoshimi Nishigawa	Japan	2:26.35	
8	Carolyn Woods	United States	2:27.42	

Key: WR = World record
