= Swimming at the 1972 Summer Olympics – Women's 400 metre individual medley =

Women's 400 metre individual medley at the Games of the XX Olympiad
- Venue: Olympia Schwimmhalle
- Date: 21 August 1972 (heats & final)
- Competitors: 38 from 24 nations
- Winning time: 5:02.97 WR

Medalists
1st place, gold medalist(s)		Gail Neall	Australia
2nd place, silver medalist(s)		Leslie Cliff	Canada
3rd place, bronze medalist(s)		Novella Calligaris	Italy

The women's 400 metre individual medley event at the 1972 Summer Olympics took place on August 31. This swimming event used medley swimming. Because an Olympic sized swimming pool is 50 metres long, this race consisted of eight lengths of the pool. The first two lengths were swum using the butterfly stroke, the second pair with the backstroke, the third pair of lengths in breaststroke, and the final two were freestyle. Unlike other freestyle events, swimmers cannot use butterfly, backstroke, or breaststroke for the freestyle leg; most swimmers use the front crawl in freestyle events.

== Results ==
=== Heats ===
Heat 1

Rank	Athlete	Country	Time	Notes
1	Gail Neall	Australia	5:11.89	
2	Susan Hunter	New Zealand	5:14.47	
3	Jaroslava Slavíčková	Czechoslovakia	5:18.53	
4	Birutė Užkuraitytė	Soviet Union	5:20.05	
5	Helga Niemann	West Germany	5:21.97	
6	Shelagh Ratcliffe	Great Britain	5:24.27	
7	Helmi Boxberger	West Germany	5:32.31	
8	Silvia Borgini	Argentina	5:44.22	

Heat 2

Rank	Athlete	Country	Time	Notes
1	Hennie Penterman	Netherlands	5:14.99	
2	Marlies Pohl	East Germany	5:15.38	
3	Jennifer McHugh	Canada	5:20.25	
4	Debbie Bengtson	Canada	5:21.62	
5	Eva Sigg	Finland	5:22.92	
6	Karen Moras	Australia	5:24.13	
7	Kirsten Strange-Campbell	Denmark	5:25.97	

Heat 3

Rank	Athlete	Country	Time	Notes
1	Lynn Vidali	United States	5:09.67	
2	Novella Calligaris	Italy	5:11.16	
3	Gerda Lassooij	Netherlands	5:22.09	
4	Maria Isabel Guerra	Brazil	5:24.43	
5	Trine Krogh	Norway	5:25.08	
6	Diane Walker	Great Britain	5:28.82	
7	Eleni Avlonitou	Greece	5:32.49	
8	Béatrice Mottoulle	Belgium	5:35.38	

Heat 4

Rank	Athlete	Country	Time	Notes
1	Evelyn Stolze	East Germany	5:06.96	
2	Jenny Bartz	United States	5:07.31	
3	Nina Petrova	Soviet Union	5:13.42	
4	Yukari Takemoto	Japan	5:20.89	
5	Wijda Mazereeuw	Netherlands	5:24.00	
6	Laura Vaca	Mexico	5:24.63	
7	Roselina Angee	Colombia	5:35.44	

Heat 5

Rank	Athlete	Country	Time	Notes
1	Leslie Cliff	Canada	5:08.64	
2	Mary Montgomery	United States	5:13.62	
3	Angela Franke	East Germany	5:14.81	
4	Anita Zarnowiecki	Sweden	5:15.05	
5	Susan Richardson	Great Britain	5:19.53	
6	Susanne Niesner	Switzerland	5:25.23	
7	Gisela Cerezo	Venezuela	5:29.56	
8	María Ballesteros	Mexico	5:31.06	

=== Final ===
Rank	Athlete	Country	Time	Notes
1	Gail Neall	Australia	5:02.97	WR
2	Leslie Cliff	Canada	5:03.57	
3	Novella Calligaris	Italy	5:03.99	
4	Jenny Bartz	United States	5:05.56	
5	Evelyn Stolze	East Germany	5:06.80	
6	Mary Montgomery	United States	5:09.98	
7	Lynn Vidali	United States	5:13.06	
8	Nina Petrova	Soviet Union	5:15.68	

Key: WR = World record
