= Swimming at the 1971 Pan American Games – Women's 400 metre individual medley =

Women's 400 metre individual medley at the 1971 Pan American Games
- Venue: -
- Dates: August 8 (preliminaries and finals)
- Competitors: from - nations

Medalists
Gold medal	Leslie Cliff	Canada
Silver medal	Cindy Plaisted	United States
Bronze medal	Susie Atwood	United States

The Women's 400 metre individual medley competition of the swimming events at the 1971 Pan American Games took place on 8 August. The last Pan American Games champion was Claudia Kolb of US.

This race consisted of eight lengths of the pool. The first two lengths were swum using the butterfly stroke, the second pair with the backstroke, the third pair of lengths in breaststroke, and the final two were freestyle.

== Results ==
All times are in minutes and seconds.

KEY:	q	Fastest non-qualifiers	Q	Qualified	GR	Games record	NR	National record	PB	Personal best	SB	Seasonal best

=== Final ===
The final was held on August 8.

Rank	Name	Nationality	Time	Notes
1st place, gold medalist(s)	Leslie Cliff	Canada	5:13.3	
2nd place, silver medalist(s)	Cindy Plaisted	United States	5:13.6	
3rd place, bronze medalist(s)	Susie Atwood	United States	5:13.8	
4	Laura Vaca	Mexico	5:27.5	
5	Maria Isabel Guerra	Brazil	5:27.7	SA
6	Olga Lucia de Angulo	Colombia	5:32.0	
7	Jeanne Waarren	Canada	5:33.3	
8	Ana de la Portilla	Mexico	5:34.0	
