= Swimming Canada =

National governing body for competitive swimming in Canada

- Sport: Swimming (Amateur)
- Jurisdiction: National
- Founded: 1909
- Headquarters: Ottawa, Ontario, Canada
- President: Susan Owen
- Vice president: Zack Chetrat
- Secretary: Dawn Wilson

Official website
- www.swimming.ca
- (Canada)

Swimming Canada is the national governing body for competitive swimming in Canada. It was established in 1909, as the Canadian Amateur Swimming Association. Swimming Canada oversees the management of all swim programs throughout the nation and provides the foundation for beginner-level athletes to train towards the elite level, with the chance to attend world championships and the Olympic Games. The national headquarters is located in Ottawa, Ontario, with staff dispersed throughout Canada.

== History ==
The Canadian Amateur Swimming Association was established in 1909, after the preliminary appearance of a Canadian swimmer at the London 1908 Summer Olympics. Robert Zimmerman of Montreal was the first Canadian Swimmer to appear at any Olympic Games, competing in the 100m freestyle, 100m backstroke, and springboard Diving.

At the 1912 Summer Olympics, George Hodgson won Canada's first two Olympic swimming medals and set a world record in the 1500 meter freestyle. Elaine Tanner became the first Canadian to win three swimming medals at the Mexico 1968 Summer Olympics. In the Montreal 1976 Summer Olympics, Canadian swimmers accounted for eight of the total 11 medals won by Team Canada.

The Canadian Olympic team has brought swimmers to each Olympic Games, except for the 1980 Summer Olympics in Moscow, due to a government boycott. Over the past 100 years, Canadian swimmers have earned over 40 medals at the Olympic games, as well as many other successes through World Championship competitions.

In the Rio 2016 Summer Olympics, the Canadian women's swim team earned six out of the 22 medals that Team Canada won during the Games. Four of the six medals were earned by 16 year-old Penny Oleksiak, the only Canadian to win four medals in a single Olympic Games.

== Meets ==
Swimming Canada works with local club teams, university teams and national select teams, as well as community members to make annual events possible.

- Canadian Swimming Championships: Senior national championship swim meet. Swimmers may range from Olympic athletes to rising Olympic potential who have all qualified for the national time standards (50M) established for that year.
- Canadian Junior Championships: Junior national championship swim meet. May run combined with CSCs. Typically run in late July.
- Age Group Championships: A competition divided by gender, for swimmers 18 years and younger. Created for athletes striving to reach the elite-level. This is typically a season-ending, long course (50M) competition that occurs annually at the end of July/beginning of August. Similar to the national competition, swimmers need to qualify for time standards established for their age and that apply to that year of competition.
- Trials: The annual competition which results in the selection of the Senior National and Junior National Canadian teams. During the Olympic year this competition will determine the selection for the Canadian Olympic team. This also requires time standards to be met in order to compete and is typically swam long course as well. During an Olympic year the top two people who qualify for FINA A time standards will make the Olympic Team and those events which qualify for a relay (100, 200 Free) will take the top four swimmers to the Games.
- Canadian Olympic & Para-Swimming Trials: This competition takes place every four years to determine the selection for the Canadian Olympic and Paralympic swim team.
- Speedo Eastern Open: In addition to national championship competitions, Swimming Canada pairs with local organizing committees to run a regional open meet. This meet is for Eastern Canadian clubs and swimmers where specific time standards are established for that area. These meets offer a competitive environment to prepare for trials, exposure to more elite competitions and provides an opportunity to prepare for larger competitions later in the year.
- Speedo Western Open: Swimming Canada pairs with local organizing committees to run two regional open meets. This meet is for Western Canadian clubs and swimmers who have their own individual standards as well. These meets offer a competitive environment to prepare for trials, be exposed to more elite competitions and prepare for larger competitions later in the year.

== Team Canada ==
The national team as well as the junior national team is selected every year at Swimming Canada's Trials competition, and every four years those members form the Olympic team. Swimmers who win the meet and are able to achieve qualifying times set by FINA are then selected for the national team.

== Circle of Excellence ==
Since 2001 Swimming Canada has honoured "the greatest Canadian swimmers of all time", and some coaches and builders, by induction into its Circle of Excellence.

=== Swimmers ===
- Ryan Cochrane 2017
- Stephanie Dixon 2016
- Marcel Gery 2015
- Stephen Clarke 2015
- Andrew Haley 2015
- Donna-Marie Gurr 2013
- Joanne (Mucz) Vergara 2012
- Graham Smith 2012
- Wendy Quirk 2012
- Becky Smith 2012
- Tim McIsaac 2012
- Josée Lake 2012
- Ralph Hutton 2011
- Mike West 2011
- Jessica Sloan 2011
- Marion Lay 2010
- Marilyn Corson 2010
- Bruce Robertson 2010
- Michael Edgson 2009
- Cheryl Gibson 2009
- Elaine Tanner 2009
- Greg Streppel 2009
- Alex Baumann 2008
- Kelly Stefanyshyn 2008
- Leslie Cliff 2007
- Jane Kerr 2006
- Sandy Goss 2006
- Anne Jardin 2006
- Anne Gagnon 2005
- Nathalie Giguère 2005
- George Hodgson 2005
- Richard Pound 2005
- Mark Tewksbury 2004
- Anne Ottenbrite 2004
- Lori Melien 2003
- Keltie Duggan 2003
- Andrea Nugent 2003
- Tom Ponting 2003
- Cam Henning 2003
- Curtis Myden 2002
- Victor Davis 2001

=== Coaches ===
- Randy Bennett 2018
- Howard Firby 2011
- George Gate 2008
- Jeno Tihanyi 2007
- Deryk Snelling 2007
- Clifford Barry 2007
- Paul Meronen 2007

=== Builders ===
- Edgar Théôret 2008
- G.L "Flip" Filippelli 2008
