= Swimming at the 1967 Pan American Games – Women's 200 metre freestyle =

Women's 200 metre freestyle at the 1967 Pan American Games
- Venue: Pan Am Pool
- Dates: July 26 (preliminaries and finals)
- Competitors: from - nations

Medalists
| Gold medal | Pam Kruse | United States |
| Silver medal | Marion Lay | Canada |
| Bronze medal | Angela Coughlan | Canada |

The women's 200 metre freestyle competition of the swimming events at the 1967 Pan American Games took place on 26 July at the Pan Am Pool. The last Pan American Games champion was Robyn Johnson of US.

This race consisted of four lengths of the pool, all in freestyle.

== Results ==
All times are in minutes and seconds.

| KEY: | q | Fastest non-qualifiers | Q | Qualified | GR | Games record | NR | National record | PB | Personal best | SB | Seasonal best |

=== Final ===
The final was held on July 26.

| Rank | Name | Nationality | Time | Notes |
|---|---|---|---|---|
| 1st place, gold medalist(s) | Pam Kruse | United States | 2:11.9 | GR |
| 2nd place, silver medalist(s) | Marion Lay | Canada | 2:14.6 | |
| 3rd place, bronze medalist(s) | Angela Coughlan | Canada | 2:15.6 | |
| 4 | Lillian Watson | United States | 2:19.7 | |
| 5 | Anita Lallande | Puerto Rico | 2:20.4 | |
| 6 | Carmen Ferracuti | El Salvador | 2:20.9 | |
| 7 | Maria Teresa Ramírez | Mexico | 2:21.6 | |
| 8 | Laura Vaca | Mexico | 2:24.7 | |
