= Swimming at the 1971 Pan American Games – Women's 200 metre individual medley =

Women's 200 metre individual medley at the 1971 Pan American Games
- Venue: -
- Dates: August 6 (preliminaries and finals)
- Competitors: from - nations

Medalists
Gold medal	Leslie Cliff	Canada
Silver medal	Susie Atwood	United States
Bronze medal	Cindy Plaisted	United States

The women's 200 metre individual medley competition of the swimming events at the 1971 Pan American Games took place on 6 August. The last Pan American Games champion was Claudia Kolb of US.

This race consisted of four lengths of the pool, one each in backstroke, breaststroke, butterfly and freestyle swimming.

== Results ==
All times are in minutes and seconds.

KEY:	q	Fastest non-qualifiers	Q	Qualified	GR	Games record	NR	National record	PB	Personal best	SB	Seasonal best

=== Final ===
The final was held on August 6.

Rank	Name	Nationality	Time	Notes
1st place, gold medalist(s)	Leslie Cliff	Canada	2:30.0	
2nd place, silver medalist(s)	Susie Atwood	United States	2:30.3	
3rd place, bronze medalist(s)	Cindy Plaisted	United States	2:33.2	
4	Maria Isabel Guerra	Brazil	2:35.1	SA
5	Rosemary Ribeiro	Brazil	2:36.5	
6	Laura Vaca	Mexico	2:37.9	
7	Patrícia Clano	Colombia	2:42.2	
8	Patrícia Muniz	Argentina	2:42.9	
