= New Zealand at the 1968 Summer Olympics =

- IOC code: NZL
- NOC: New Zealand Olympic and British Commonwealth Games Association
- Website: www.olympic.org.nz

in Mexico City
- Competitors: 52 (47 men, 5 women) in 8 sports
- Flag bearer: Don Oliver (weightlifting)
- Officials: 16
- Medals Ranked 27th: Gold 1 Silver 0 Bronze 2 Total 3

Summer Olympics appearances (overview)
- 1908; 1912; 1920; 1924; 1928; 1932; 1936; 1948; 1952; 1956; 1960; 1964; 1968; 1972; 1976; 1980; 1984; 1988; 1992; 1996; 2000; 2004; 2008; 2012; 2016; 2020; 2024

Other related appearances
- Australasia (1908–1912)

New Zealand at the 1968 Summer Olympics was represented by a team of 52 competitors, 47 men and five women, who took part in 26 events across eight sports. Selection of the team for the Games in Mexico City, Mexico, was the responsibility of the New Zealand Olympic and British Commonwealth Games Association. New Zealand's flagbearer at the opening ceremony was Don Oliver. The New Zealand team finished 27th on the medal table, winning a total of three medals, one of which was gold.

== Medal tables ==
Medal	Name	Sport	Event	Date
Gold	Warren Cole; Ross Collinge; Simon Dickie; Dick Joyce; Dudley Storey	Rowing	Men's coxed four	19 October
Bronze	Ian Ballinger	Shooting	Mixed 50 metre rifle, prone	19 October
Bronze	Mike Ryan	Athletics	Men's marathon	20 October

Medals by sport
Sport	Gold medal	Silver medal	Bronze medal	Total
Rowing	1	0	0	1
Athletics	0	0	1	1
Shooting	0	0	1	1
Total	1	0	2	3

Medals by gender
Gender	Gold medal	Silver medal	Bronze medal	Total
Male	1	0	1	2
Female	0	0	0	0
Mixed / open	0	0	1	1
Total	1	0	2	3

== Athletics ==
=== Track and road ===
Athlete	Event	Heat		Semifinal		Final	
Athlete	Event	Result	Rank (Note: Ranks given are within the heat)	Result	Rank (Note: Ranks given are within the semifinal)	Result	Rank
Roger Johnson	Men's 400 m hurdles	51.3	2 Q	51.8	7	did not advance	
Rex Maddaford	Men's 5000 m	14:20.8	4 Q	—N/a		14:39.8	10
Rex Maddaford	Men's 10,000 m	—N/a				30:17.2	12
Evan Maguire	Men's 10,000 m	—N/a				DNF	
Dave McKenzie	Men's marathon	—N/a				2:43:36	37
Sylvia Potts	Women's 800 m	2:09.6	4 Q	2:07.2	6	did not advance	
Mike Ryan	Men's marathon	—N/a				2:23:45	3rd place, bronze medalist(s)
Peter Welsh	Men's 3000 m steeplechase	9:13.8	6	—N/a		did not advance	

=== Field ===
Athlete	Event	Qualification		Final	
Athlete	Event	Result	Rank	Result	Rank
Les Mills	Men's shot put	19.00	11 Q	18.18	11
Robin Tait	Men's discus throw	58.88	9 Q	57.68	12

== Cycling ==
Five cyclists represented New Zealand in 1968.

=== Road ===
Men's individual road race

Athlete	Time	Rank
Bryce Beeston	DNF	
John Dean	DNF	
Des Thomson	5:02:33.62	52
Richie Thomson	DNF	

Men's team time trial

Athlete	Time	Rank
John Dean; Neil Lyster; Des Thomson; Richie Thomson	2:25:46.47	23

== Field hockey ==
=== Men's tournament ===
Team roster

John Anslow; Jan Borren; Roger Capey; John Christensen; John Hicks; Bruce Judge; Barry Maister; Selwyn Maister	Trevor Manning; Alan McIntyre; Ross McPherson; Jim Palmer; Alan Patterson; Ted Salmon; Bill Thomson; Keith Thomson

Group A

13 October 1968

New Zealand	2–1	India

14 October 1968

New Zealand	2–0	Mexico

15 October 1968

New Zealand	1–1	East Germany

17 October 1968

New Zealand	1–0	Japan

18 October 1968

New Zealand	0–0	West Germany

20 October 1968

New Zealand	1–1	Belgium

21 October 1968

New Zealand	1–1	Spain

Team	Pld	W	D	L	GF	GA	Pts	Qualification
India	7	6	0	1	20	4	12	Advance to semi-finals
West Germany	7	5	1	1	15	5	11	Advance to semi-finals
New Zealand	7	3	4	0	10	8	10	5th–8th place classification
Spain	7	2	3	2	7	5	7	5th–8th place classification
Belgium	7	3	1	3	14	9	7	9th / 10th place play-off
East Germany	7	2	2	3	7	10	6	11th / 12th place play-off
Japan	7	1	1	5	4	14	3	13th / 14th place play-off
Mexico	7	0	0	7	2	26	0	15th / 16th place play-off

5th–8th Classification matches

23 October 1968

Netherlands	3–1	New Zealand

7th / 8th Place play-off

25 October 1968

New Zealand	2–0	Kenya

New Zealand finished the men's field hockey tournament in seventh place.

== Rowing ==
In 1968, New Zealand entered boats in two of the seven events: men's coxed four and men's eight. The competition was for men only; women would first row at the 1976 Summer Olympics.

Athlete	Event	Heats		Repechage		Semi-finals		Final	
Athlete	Event	Time	Rank	Time	Rank	Time	Rank	Time	Rank
Warren Cole; Ross Collinge; Dick Joyce; Dudley Storey; Simon Dickie (cox)	Coxed four	7:12.19	1 QS	Bye		6:48.65	1 FA	6:45.62	1st place, gold medalist(s)
Alan Webster; Wybo Veldman; Alistair Dryden; John Hunter; Mark Brownlee; John Gibbons; Tom Just; Gil Cawood; Robert Page (cox)	Coxed eight	6:05.62	1 FA	Bye		—N/a		6:10.43	4

== Sailing ==
Athlete	Event	Race							Net points	Final rank
Athlete	Event	1	2	3	4	5	6	7	Net points	Final rank
Jonty Farmer	Finn	19.0	3.0	11.7	25.0	25.0	13.0	~~40.0~~; ~~DNF~~	96.7	11
Ralph Roberts; Geoff Smale (helm)	Flying Dutchman	~~39.0~~; ~~DSQ~~	14.0	15.0	18.0	15.0	14.0	8.0	84.0	8

- Graham Mander was the reserve Flying Dutchman skipper.

== Shooting ==
Two male shooters represented New Zealand in 1968 with Ian Ballinger winning a bronze medal.

Athlete	Event	Round 1	Round 2	Round 3	Round 4	Round 5	Round 6	Total	Rank
Ian Ballinger	Mixed 50 m rifle, prone	98	100	100	99	100	100	597	3rd place, bronze medalist(s)
Stew Nairn	Mixed 50 m rifle, prone	99	99	98	100	98	100	594	12

== Swimming ==
Athlete	Event	Heat		Semifinal		Final	
Athlete	Event	Result	Rank	Result	Rank	Result	Rank
Pru Chapman	Women's 100 m backstroke	1:15.2	32	did not advance			
Pru Chapman	Women's 200 m individual medley	2:42.1	=23	—N/a		did not advance	
Tui Shipston	Women's 200 m individual medley	2:35.5	9	—N/a		did not advance	
Tui Shipston	Women's 400 m individual medley	5:33.7	=7 Q	—N/a		5:34.6	7
Tui Shipston	Women's 800 m freestyle	10:28.0	19	—N/a		did not advance	
Glenda Stirling	Women's 100 m backstroke	1:10.2	=7 Q	1:10.1	8 Q	1:10.6	8
Glenda Stirling	Women's 200 m backstroke	2:40.3	22	—N/a		did not advance	
Sandra Whittleston	Women's 100 m butterfly	1:08.5	=9 Q	1:08.7	12	did not advance	
Sandra Whittleston	Women's 200 m butterfly	2:39.7	=11	—N/a		did not advance	
Glenda Stirling; Pru Chapman; Sandra Whittleston; Tui Shipston	Women's 4 × 100 m medley relay	4:49.0	11	—N/a		did not advance	

== Weightlifting ==
Athlete	Event	Press		Snatch		Clean & Jerk		Total	Rank
Athlete	Event	Result	Rank	Result	Rank	Result	Rank	Total	Rank
John Bolton	Men's light heavyweight	137.5	=11	122.5	16	160.0	=15	420.0	16
Don Oliver	Men's heavyweight	147.5	13	142.5	=9	200.0	5	490.0	8

== Officials ==
- Chef de Mission – Lloyd Hosking
- Assistant team manager – Don Croot
- Team doctor – Mayne Smeeton
- Chaperone – Norma Williams
- Athletics section manager – Laurie O'Keefe
- Cycling section manager – Clive Herbert
- Hockey section manager – Ray Mackinlay
- Rowing coach – Rusty Robertson
- Sailing section manager – Hugh Poole
- Shooting section manager – Neilson Rees
- Swimming section manager – Roly Webb
- Weightlifting section manager – Paul Newberry
