= Swimming at the 1971 Pan American Games – Women's 400 metre freestyle =

Women's 400 metre freestyle at the 1971 Pan American Games
- Venue: -
- Dates: August 9 (preliminaries and finals)
- Competitors: from - nations

Medalists
Gold medal	Ann Simmons	United States
Silver medal	Jill Strong	United States
Bronze medal	Angela Coughlan	Canada

The women's 400 metre freestyle competition of the swimming events at the 1971 Pan American Games took place on 9 August. The last Pan American Games champion was Debbie Meyer of US.

This race consisted of eight lengths of the pool, with all eight being in the freestyle stroke.

== Results ==
All times are in minutes and seconds.

KEY:	q	Fastest non-qualifiers	Q	Qualified	GR	Games record	NR	National record	PB	Personal best	SB	Seasonal best

=== Final ===
The final was held on August 9.

Rank	Name	Nationality	Time	Notes
1st place, gold medalist(s)	Ann Simmons	United States	4:26.2	
2nd place, silver medalist(s)	Jill Strong	United States	4:36.2	
3rd place, bronze medalist(s)	Angela Coughlan	Canada	4:38.9	
4	-	-	-	
5	Rosalinda Angel	Colombia	4:45.3	
6	Olga de Angulo	Colombia	4:46.4	
7	Sandra Smith	Canada	4:50.6	
8	Patrícia Lopez	Argentina	5:09.1	
