= Helmut Levy =

Colombian swimmer (born 1959)

Personal information
- Full name: Helmut Arturo Levy Quintero
- National team: Columbia
- Born: March 16, 1959 (age 67) Ibagué, Tolima, Columbia
- Height: 166 cm (5 ft 5 in)
- Weight: 68 kg (150 lb)

Sport
- Sport: Swimming
- Strokes: breaststroke, individual medley freestyle
- College team: Indian River State College; University of Miami
- Coach: Bill Diaz (U. Miami)
Medal record
Representing Colombia
Central American and Caribbean Games
Gold medal – first place	1978 Medellin	200m breaststroke
Gold medal – first place	1978 Medellin	200m individual medley

Helmut Levy (born 16 March 1959) is a Colombian former swimmer who competed for the University of Miami and participated in both the 1976 Summer Olympics in Montreal and the 1980 Summer Olympics in Moscow. Since leaving competitive swimming, he has worked as a swim coach for children and adults with special needs for over thirty years, and was a founder of Global Adaptive Aquatics in greater Atlanta, Georgia.

Helmut Levy was born 16 March 1959 in Ibagué, Tolima, Columbia.

== College swimming ==
Levy attended Indian River State College from around 1976-1978. While at Indian River, in January 1977, he set a new junior college record for the 200-meter Individual Medley of 1:59.713. In the Fall of 1978, he transferred as a Junior to the University of Miami where he was an All American. At Miami, he was coached by Bill Diaz, who crafted Miami into one of America's elite swimming programs during his coaching tenure from 1971-1984. At a Miami meet in February 1979, Levy placed second in the 200-yard breaststroke with a time of 2:08.97, and third in the 200-yard individual medley with a time of 1:55.22 in a losing meet against Tennessee. In August, 1978, Levy was rated 11th in the world in the 200 and 400-meter Individual Medley.

== 1976, 1980 Olympics ==
Levy represented Columbia in the 1976 Montreal and 1980 Moscow Olympics.

In the July, 1976 Montreal Olympics, in the 100-meter freestyle, Levy swam a 54.60, finishing sixth in the second preliminary heat, and did not make the finals. He swam a time that was 33rd overall among the competitors and was around 3.3 seconds behind the time of bronze medalist Peter Nocke of West Germany.

On July 26, 1980, Levy participated in the 200-meter breaststroke event at the 1980 Moscow Olympics representing Columbia. He swam a 2:27.94, placing fifth in the third preliminary heat, and did not make the finals. He finished 15th overall, in one of his better Olympic performances. His time was around 10 seconds behind the bronze medal winner Arsens Miskarov of Russia.

In the 100-meter breaststroke at the 1980 Moscow Olympics, he swam a 1:07.06 placing 6th in the third heat and 19th overall, and did not make the finals. His time was around 4 seconds behind the time of the bronze medal winner Peter Evans of Australia.

While representing Columbia in international competition, Levy captured gold medals in the 200m breaststroke and 200m individual medley at the 1978 Central American and Caribbean Games. He was ranked globally among the top 12 swimmers for two consecutive years in the 200m individual medley. Levy won five gold medals at the South American Swimming Championships held in Guayaquil Ecuador, sponsored by the South American Swimming Confederation, in May 1978.

== Special needs swim coach ==
After his career as a competitive swimmer ended, Levy served as a swimming coach for special needs children, founding Global Adaptive Aquatics on Peachtree Blvd. In Norcross, Georgia, twenty miles Northeast of Atlanta. He has served over thirty years as a coach working with special needs children, and has taught swimming to special needs individuals in Australia, Colombia, Israel and the U.S.A. Global Adaptive provides aquatics training to special needs children and adults, including private lessons, as well as seminars and meets. They have had a training facility at West Gwinnett Park Aquatics Center in the Atlanta area.
