= Tui Shipston =

New Zealand swimmer

Personal information
- Full name: Kathleen Tui Shipston
- Born: 19 September 1951 (age 74) Christchurch, New Zealand

Sport
- Sport: Swimming
- Strokes: Individual medley
- Club: Elmwood Amateur Swimming Club
- Coach: Jack Breward

Kathleen Tui Shipston (born 19 September 1951) is a New Zealand former competitive swimmer who competed at the 1968 Summer Olympics.

Shipston was known for her ability to swim all strokes and distances and qualified for all 22 events at the 1967 National Swimming Championships and notable held over 75 Canterbury and New Zealand records in 1967.

Shipston attended St. Margaret's College in Christchurch.

Shipston married Humphrey Brett Wood in 1971.

== Swimming Career ==
=== 1966 British Empire and Commonwealth Games ===
Shipston qualified for the 1966 British Empire and Commonwealth Games held in Kingston, Jamaica when she went under the target mark as a 14-year-old swimming solo at Moana Pool in Dunedin.

Racing in the heats of the 220 yard backstroke, Shipston finished 10th in a time of 2:46.2 and 11th in the heats 110 yard backstroke.

Shipston failed to progress to the final of the 440 yard individual medley but was promoted to the final after compatriot Margaret Macrae pulled out of the race to focus on other races. In the final, Shipston finished in 8th place.

Shipston raced in the 440 yards medley relay team that finished 5th in the final alongside Macrae, Vivien Haddon and Heather Kerr.

=== 1968 Summer Olympics ===
Aged sixteen, Shipston competed at the 1968 Summer Olympics held in Mexico City after going under the Olympic target time by 0.2 seconds and bettering her own national senior record by 3.7 at the 1968 Canterbury Championships at Centennial Pool.

In the heats of the 400 metre individual medley, Shipston finished second behind Marianne Seydel of East Germany in a time of 5:33.7 progressing to the final where she finished 7th in a time of 5:34.6. Sickness impacted Shipston's performance in the race after failing to eat or sleep before race. Manager of the team Mr R. Webb was opposed to her swimming in the heats and after her race spoke of her determination and courage.

Despite winning her heat in the 200 metre individual medley, her time of 2:35.5 was not good enough to make the final. She finished 4th in her heat of the 800 metre freestyle in a time of 10:28.0.

Shipston also joined with Glenda Stirling, Pru Chapman and Sandra Whittleston in the 4x100 metre medley relay but finished 6th in Heat 1 with a 4:49.0.

Shipston was coached by local swim coach legend Jack Breward who taught her to swim and coached her between the ages of nine and eighteen.

== Honours ==
- 1969 Swimming New Zealand Baxter O'Neill Trophy - Swimmer of the Year
- 1969 Swimming New Zealand Harold Pettit Trophy - Highest individual Points Scorer
