= Debbie Bengtson =

Canadian swimmer

Personal information
- Born: 10 July 1957 (age 69) Kitchener, Ontario, Canada

Sport
- Sport: Swimming

Debbie Bengtson (born 10 July 1957) is a Canadian former swimmer. She competed in the women's 400 metre individual medley at the 1972 Summer Olympics.
