= Marlies Pohl =

German swimmer

Personal information
- Born: 16 October 1955 (age 70) Rostock, Germany

Sport
- Sport: Swimming

Marlies Pohl (born 16 October 1955) is a German former swimmer. She competed in the women's 400 metre individual medley at the 1972 Summer Olympics.
