= Bob Mattson =

Competitive swimmer (1931–2023)

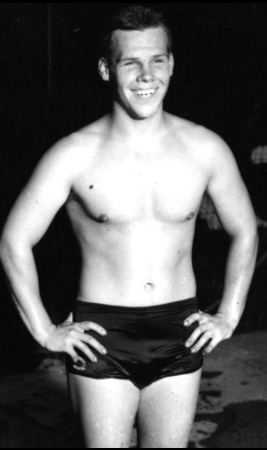
- Mattson in 1955 as NC State swimmer

Biographical details
- Born: April 21, 1931; Philadelphia, Pennsylvania, U.S.
- Died: June 29, 2023 (aged 92); Wilmington, Delaware, U.S.
- Education: North Carolina State University

Playing career
- 1951-1955: North Carolina State
- Positions: medley, breaststroke

Coaching career (HC unless noted)
- 1954-1994: Wilmington Aquatic Club; Wilmington, DE

Accomplishments and honors

Championships
- 1989 Middle Atlantic Senior Swimming Championship

Awards
- 2017 ASCA Hall of Fame; 1987 North Carolina Swimming Hall of Fame

Robert Erwin Mattson (April 21, 1931 – June 29, 2023) was an American competitive swimmer for North Carolina State and an ASCA Hall of Fame swim coach who founded Delaware's highly successful Wilmington Aquatic Club, serving forty years as coach from 1954 to 1994.

Born in Philadelphia, Pennsylvania on April 21, 1931, to a struggling single mother, around age six he moved to Worcester, Massachusetts where he grew up. He swam at the Worcester Boys Club, and began attending prestigious Williston Academy Preparatory School in Easthampton, on a scholarship at age 13. He received All America honors for swimming in both High School and at Prep School. Soon Coach Willis Casey took notice of his swimming skills and gave him a swimming scholarship to North Carolina State University.

== North Carolina State ==
He swam competitively for North Carolina State University from 1951 to 1955 under Coach Willis Casey, who never had a losing season, and had an exceptional NC State Swimming Dual Meet record of 189-23.

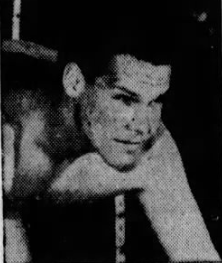
Mattson at AAU meet in 1955

Mattson was NC State's first national champion, taking the honor in the 200-yard breaststroke in 1955. His March 11, 1955 National Collegiate record in the 200-yard breaststroke of 2:24.9 came in the preliminaries of the ACC Swimming Championships in Chapel Hill, although his winning time in the finals of 2:33.5 was a good bit slower than his record. Still a dominant breaststroke performance, he won the finals a full quarter length ahead of the second-place finisher. Earlier, in February 1954, he set a new National collegiate record in the 120-yard individual medley of 1:11.9.

He was the first NC State swimmer to receive All-American honors in four consecutive years. In August 1954, he swam breaststroke with the team of backstroker Bill Sonner, Butterflier Dick Fadgen, and Freestyler Dave McIntyre and won the 400-meter medley relay at the National AAU Swimming meet in Indianapolis with a time of 4:34.7. In an equally rare distinction, in 1954 he captured the world record in the 400-individual medley with a time of 5:31.2, set at the Dixie American Athletic Meet in Kinston, North Carolina.

=== Graduation and professional work ===
Receiving his B.S. with honors in Chemistry after graduating NC State second in his class in 1955, he took a job in the textile chemistry industry, for the Joseph Bancroft Company, where he led the team that initially developed and then produced the Ban-Lon shirt.

He continued to pursue swimming at Wilmington's Central Branch YMCA and coached some with Hercules, Inc., summer club teams. Soon he had a regular year-round crew of swimmers he'd coach in the indoor pool at Wilmington's Jewish Community Center, on French Street in Wilmington.

== Wilmington Aquatic Club ==
After initially coaching swimming on the side, he started the Wilmington Aquatic Club with only 15 swimmers by around 1954-5. Mattson used the majority of his savings to begin building the Wilmington Swim School, and quit his textiles job by 1963 to coach full time. By 1966, he had grown the program to over 150 swimmers, and to 400 within a few more years. In 1967, he founded the Wilmington Swim School on New Castle Avenue in Wilmington, Delaware, West of the Delaware River, after leaving his lucrative position in the textile industry, and building his own pool with the majority of his savings. The $300,000 cost was met by draining his life savings, selling around $40,000 in debenture bonds, contributions from family members and a favorable land deal. It officially opened in 1967 and Mattson owned it until 1994. He raised funds in a risky, forward-thinking method by signing families as life members before he had completed the new facility. The pool and building still stand at the base of the Delaware Memorial Bridge, that links Delaware to New Jersey. The club later grew to include a health center with a spacious second pool, that allowed competition and many forms of training, as well as rehabilitation. The facility was an industry leader in holistic health in the 1970s. Mattson served as Coach through 1994. Mattson continued coaching into the 2000s.

Recognized by the U.S. and internationally as a skilled coach, in 1975 he assisted the Panamanian swim team in preparing for the Pan American Games in Mexico City. In 1976, he was named as Head Coach by the AAU of a U.S. Swim Team that toured South America.

In 1989, after a few years hiatus from the Wilmington Athletic Club, Mattson led the team to the Middle Atlantic Senior Swimming Championship at the University of Delaware in the first week of December, despite a competitive field of 27 teams. Mattson credited the win partly to teaching body-mind synergistics to the team, and improving flexibility by conducting hatha yoga sessions taught by his wife Nancy who also served as a coach.

Bruce Gemmell, 56, a graduate of Delaware's Mount Pleasant High School believed “Bob was an innovator before being an innovator was cool.” Gemmell swam for Mattson as a kid and coached Katie Ledecky to five Olympic gold medals. Mattson was considered unique in always being willing to try new kick and stroke techniques instead of sticking exclusively with traditional methods. Gemmell, an outstanding coach himself, believed Mattson could make small changes in stroke technique that combined with masterful coaching could vastly improve a swimmer's technique and stroke mechanics.

== Athletes coached ==
Swimmers he mentored at Wilmington included 1968 Olympians Dave Johnson and Jenny Bartz, 1976 Olympian and NCAA Champion Steve Gregg, and national champions, Marry-de Mackie, Jenni Franks and Seth Van Neerden, Tom Evans (NCSU) and Eric Ericson (UNC). He had many Olympic Trials qualifiers. Other outstanding swimmers included Larry Countryman, Shafer Henry, and Barbara Harris.

Mattson's former swimmers who became successful coaches included Edgar Johnson, older brother of the 1968 Olympian Dave, and Sid Cassidy. Johnson coached at the University of Delaware, and became their Athletic Director. Sid Cassidy coached with Mattson at WAC and later at St. Andrews Prep in Boca Raton, Florida.

== Honors ==
Mattson was inducted into the North Carolina State University Swimming Hall of Fame, the North Carolina Swimming Hall of Fame, the Delaware Sports Hall of Fame in 2005, and as mentioned, the ASCA Coach's Hall of Fame.

Mattson died at the age of 93 on June 20, 2023, in Wilmington, Delaware. He married Nancy Haubein, after coaching her in the late 1950s when she was attending Newark High School. They married in 1961 when she was a student at the University of Delaware. Nancy also coached for many years. Mattson and Nancy had children Eric, and Jennifer, and Bob had a son Steve from a previous marriage. He had seven grandchildren.
