= Carolyn Woods =

American swimmer (born 1955)

Personal information
- Full name: Carolyn Ann Woods
- National team: United States
- Born: June 24, 1955 (age 71) Long Beach, California, U.S.
- Occupations: Swim Coaching; Pediatric Nurse
- Height: 5 ft 7 in (1.70 m)
- Weight: 143 lb (65 kg)

Sport
- Sport: Swimming
- Event: 100, 200 Individual Medley
- Strokes: Individual medley
- Club: Fullerton Aquatics Club; Southern California Aquatic Club
- College team: University of Arizona; University of California Santa Barbara
- Coach: Hank Vellekamp (Fullerton Aquatics); Sherm Chavoor (72 Olympics)

Carolyn Ann Woods (born June 24, 1955) is an American former competition swimmer who specialized in breaststroke and then the Individual Medley and competed for the University of Arizona and the University of California Santa Barbara. She participated in the 1972 Munich Olympics in the women's 200-meter individual medley, finishing eighth. After graduating college at the University of California, she completed nursing school, and worked in the intensive care unit as a pediatric nurse at the University of California Irvine.

== Early life ==
Woods was born the youngest of four siblings on June 24, 1955, in the Los Angeles suburb of Long Beach, California, and attended Sunny Hills High School in Fullerton, California. Her mother Betty Lou was highly supportive of her swimming career. Woods began swimming by the age of two, and was competing in meets by five. At 10 she began winning AAU competitions, and by 13 competed at the National Junior Olympics in San Diego, California. Woods's primary youth coach was Hank Vellekamp, who coached her both with the Sunny Hills High School team, and with the strong program at the Fullerton Aquatics Club where she began swimming by the age of 12. From an athletic family, Woods's older brother Mark was a standout in football at San Jose Junior College and San Jose State, her older brother Bob played football for Sunny Hills and her sister Mary, the family's oldest girl, swam for Sunny Hills High. In 1972, likely in preparation for the Olympics, Woods swam for the Southern California Aquatics Club. During her High School career, Woods was a High School All American for three years.

Two other Sunny Hills students attended the 1972 Munich Olympics including Dana Schrader who swam the 100-meter butterfly, placing fifth, and Deanne Wilson a seventeen-year old Senior, who placed eighteenth in the High Jump.

In the Spring of 1972, Woods swam the 200-yard IM in a time of 2:11.1, a California Interscholastic Record. At the Winter National Championships in Washington State in 1972, Woods had a fifth-place finish in the 200 IM, and had times that qualified her for the upcoming Olympic trials in the 400 Individual Medley and the 100 and 200 meter breaststroke.

== 1972 Olympic trials ==
Woods qualified to compete in six events at the early August, 1972 Olympic trials at Chicago's Portage Park, but swam only in the 200 meter Individual Medley and the 100-meter breaststroke. She qualified for the 1972 Olympics in the 200 Individual Medley, placing second in the event with a 2:24.510, in an extremely close finish behind first place Lynn Vidali who swam a 2:24.465. Jennifer Bartz of Sunnyvale, California placed third with a time of 2:25.11. All three qualified for the U.S. Olympic women's team.

Woods swam a 1:20.22 in the 100-meter breaststroke at the trials, but did not advance to the finals. She swam a 2:54.97 in the 200-meter breaststroke, but was again unable to advance to the finals.

After the Chicago trials, Woods was processed in Washington, D.C., trained for a month in Tennessee, and then was honored with a dinner at the White House in Washington.

== 1972 Munich Olympics ==
At the age of 17, Woods represented the United States at the 1972 Summer Olympics on August 28, in Munich, Germany where she was managed by Head women's Coach Sherm Chavoor. She competed in the women's 200-meter individual medley, and finished eighth in the event final with a time of 2:27.42, less than 3.5 seconds from medal contention. Favorite Shane Gould of Australia placed first with a world record time of 2:23.07, and though she led throughout the backstroke leg, fellow American Lynn Vidali placed third with a 2:24.06, before being passed on the final lap by Kornelia Ender, the East German who won the silver with a time of 2:23.59.

In December of 1972, Woods was honored for her Olympic achievements receiving a bracelet from the Mayor of Fullerton, Robert Root, bearing the city seal, and a plaque from Fullerton High School principal Robert Brown at an assembly at Sunnyvale High School attended by over 1000 students.

=== College ===
Though she had taken a hiatus from elite racing by her Senior year in High School, Woods attended and swam for the University of Arizona, where in late February, 1975, she placed second in the 100 Individual Medley with a time of 1:01.6 and in the 100 breaststroke with a time of 1:09.1 at the Association for Intercollegiate Athletics for Women National Swimming Championships helping to lead the team into the AIAW finals at the University of Arizona. In the fall of 1975, the women's swim team was allocated to receive a total of $100,000, tripling the prior year's budget. In the Fall of 1975, in a program with a growing budget, and boasting a fifth place ranking, the team was coached by Margot Hurst. Woods transferred to the University of California Santa Barbara for her Junior and Senior years, around 1975-1977, and earned a B.A. in Physical Education.

=== Careers ===
In career pursuits, Woods coached the Fullerton Area Swim Team. She coached swimming in Napa Valley, at Canyon High School for eight years and at Rancho Santiago College.

After completing nursing school, she worked in intensive care pediatrics for the University of California Irvine in Orange, California while living in nearby nearby Yorba Linda.

== See also ==
- List of University of Arizona people
