= Pilar von Carsten =

Spanish swimmer

Personal information
- Born: 11 October 1947 (age 78) Madrid, Spain

Sport
- Sport: Swimming

Pilar von Carsten (born 11 October 1947) is a Spanish former swimmer. She competed in the women's 200 metre individual medley at the 1968 Summer Olympics.
