= Mary Montgomery =

American swimmer (1956–2017)

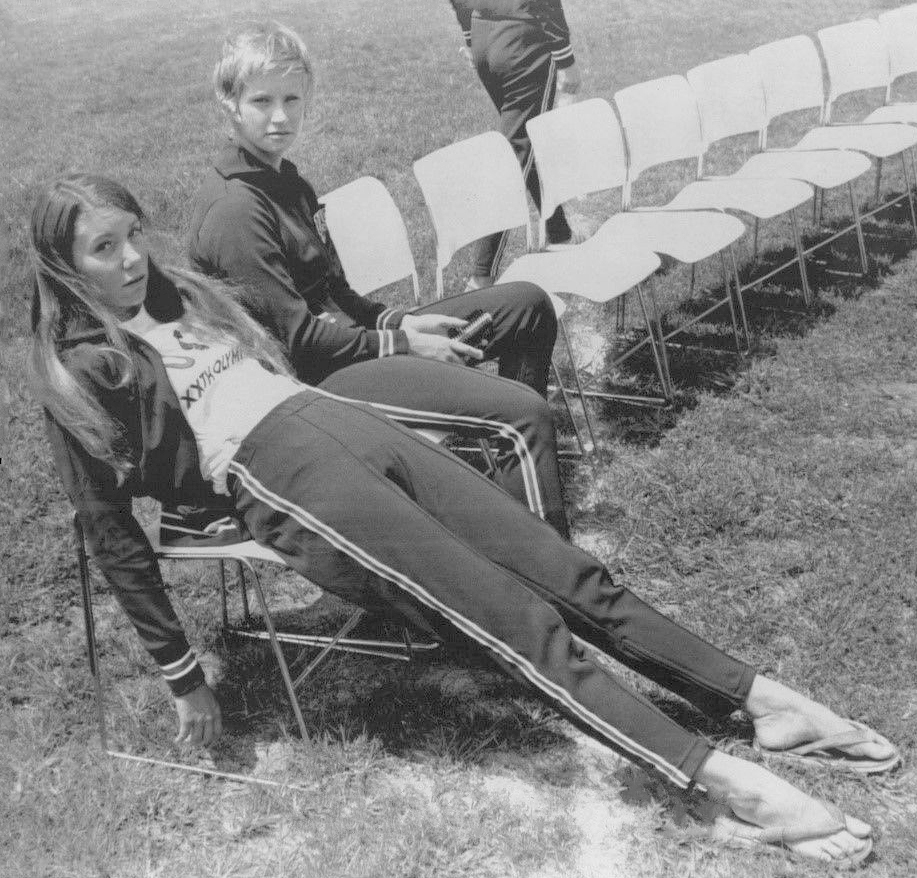
- Montgomery (right) at the 1972 Olympics

Personal information
- Full name: Mary Coulter Montgomery
- National team: United States
- Born: August 30, 1956 Asheville, North Carolina, U.S.
- Died: August 24, 2017 (aged 60) Asheville, North Carolina, U.S.
- Height: 5 ft 7 in (1.70 m)
- Weight: 126 lb (57 kg)

Sport
- Sport: Swimming
- Strokes: Individual medley, freestyle
- Club: Asheville Aquatic Club
Medal record
Representing the United States
Pan American Games
Silver medal – second place	1975 Mexico City	800 m freestyle

Mary Coulter Montgomery (August 30, 1956 – August 24, 2017) was an American competition swimmer who won a silver medal in the 800 m freestyle at the 1975 Pan American Games. She competed at the 1972 Summer Olympics in the 400-meter individual medley, finishing sixth with a time of 5:09.98.

Montgomery attended Asheville High School, graduated from The Newfound School in 1974 and Florida State University, and was coached by her mother. In 1971 she received the Teague Award as the Outstanding Women Athlete in North Carolina. That year she was ranked fourth in the world in the 200 individual medley, 11th in the 200 m freestyle, and 13th in the 400 m freestyle. She later became a swimming coach at the Asheville Racquet Club.
