= Martha Nelson-Grant =

Canadian swimmer

Personal information
- Born: 22 October 1954 (age 71) Saskatoon, Saskatchewan, Canada

Sport
- Sport: Swimming

Martha Nelson-Grant (born 22 October 1954) is a Canadian former swimmer. She competed in the women's 200 metre individual medley at the 1972 Summer Olympics.
