= Swimming at the 1971 Pan American Games – Women's 100 metre freestyle =

Women's 100 metre freestyle at the 1971 Pan American Games
- Venue: -
- Dates: August 11 (preliminaries and finals)
- Competitors: from - nations

Medalists
Gold medal	Sandy Neilson	United States
Silver medal	Angela Coughlan	Canada
Bronze medal	Karen James	Canada

The women's 100 metre freestyle competition of the swimming events at the 1971 Pan American Games took place on 11 August. The last Pan American Games champion was Erika Bricker of US.

This race consisted of two lengths of the pool, both lengths being in freestyle.

== Results ==
All times are in minutes and seconds.

KEY:	q	Fastest non-qualifiers	Q	Qualified	GR	Games record	NR	National record	PB	Personal best	SB	Seasonal best

=== Final ===
The final was held on August 11.

Rank	Name	Nationality	Time	Notes
1st place, gold medalist(s)	Sandy Neilson	United States	1:00.6	
2nd place, silver medalist(s)	Angela Coughlan	Canada	1:01.2	
3rd place, bronze medalist(s)	Karen James	Canada	1:01.9	
4	Lucy Burle	Brazil	1:02.4	
5	Katheryn McKitrick	United States	1:02.4	
6	Márcia Arriaga	Mexico	1:03.7	
7	-	-	-	
8	Liana Vicens	Puerto Rico	1:04.1	
