= Helmi Boxberger =

German swimmer

Personal information
- Born: 7 March 1950 (age 76) Altötting, Germany

Sport
- Sport: Swimming

Helmi Boxberger (born 7 March 1950) is a German former swimmer. She competed at the 1968 Summer Olympics and the 1972 Summer Olympics. In 1968, she competed in the women's 100 metre freestyle, women's 200 metre individual medley and women's 4 × 100 metre freestyle relay events. In 1972, she competed in the women's 200 metre individual medley and women's 400 metre individual medley events.
