= Karen James =

Canadian swimmer (born 1952)

Personal information
- Nationality: Canadian
- Born: 16 December 1952 (age 73) Vancouver, British Columbia, Canada

Sport
- Sport: Swimming
Medal record
Women's swimming
Representing Canada
British Commonwealth Games
Silver medal – second place	1970 Edinburgh	4×100 m freestyle
Pan American Games
Bronze medal – third place	1971 Cali	100 m freestyle

Karen James (born 16 December 1952) is a Canadian former swimmer. She won the silver medal in the 4x100m freestyle at the Commonwealth Games in Edinburgh in 1970 and the bronze medal in the 100m freestyle at the Pan American Games in Cali in 1971.

She competed in the women's 200 metre individual medley at the 1972 Summer Olympics as a member of the Canadian team. When she and some other Canadian athletes took a shortcut and climbed over a fence to re-enter the athletes' village, four masked men climbed over the fence with them. These, she later discovered, were four of the eight Black September terrorists who took hostage and murdered members of the Israeli Olympic team.

The daughter of a Jewish father and a non-Jewish mother, therefore not born a Jew under Jewish law, she was raised as a Jew and experienced anti-semitism as a child. As a 12 year old in 1965, she participated in the Maccabiah Games in Israel. She has been active in Jewish life and eventually made a formal conversion to Judaism. She has been a member of the board of the Jewish Federation of Greater Vancouver for many years. In 2006 she co-chaired swimming at the Maccabi Games in Vancouver. She is the founder of the Karen James Family Fund of the Jewish Community Foundation of Greater Vancouver. In 2012 she received the Queen Elizabeth II Diamond Jubilee Medal.
