= Pride House =

Pride House 2012 logo

Pride House is a dedicated temporary location which plays host to lesbian, gay, bisexual and transgender (LGBT) athletes, volunteers and visitors attending the Olympics, Paralympics or other international sporting event in the host city. The first was organized for the Vancouver 2010 Winter Olympics.

== Pride House Presence at Multi-Sport Games ==
=== Vancouver Winter Olympics 2010 ===
Qmunity, Vancouver's oldest LGBTQ+ community centre, served as the location of Vancouver's Pride House. During the 2010 Winter Olympics, the Vancouver and Whistler Pride Houses served as venues for LGBT sportspeople, coaches, visitors and their friends, families and supporters, and became the first Pride Houses at an Olympics. Although both Pride Houses offered information and support services to LGBT athletes and attendees, the Whistler location in Pan Pacific Village Centre had a "celebratory theme", while the Vancouver venue emphasised education about Vancouver's LGBT community and, for non-Canadian athletes, information about immigration to and asylum in Canada, including "legal resources" from Egale Canada and the International Lesbian, Gay, Bisexual, Trans and Intersex Association (IGLA).

Notable visitors to Pride House Vancouver included openly gay Canadian Olympic swimmers Mark Tewksbury and Marion Lay, Vancouver mayor Gregor Robertson and Stephen Colbert, an American political satirist and TV personality.

=== London Olympics 2012 ===
An initial project for a Pride House at the 2012 Olympics would have taken place at Clapham Common for all 17 days of the event. On 24 April 2012 it was reported that this project of the Pride House Foundation was cancelled due to lack of sponsors.

The following individuals were listed as ambassadors for Pride House:

- Gareth Thomas
- Ben Cohen
- Stephen Fry
- David Furnish
- Dan Savage
- John Amaechi OBE
- Claire Harvey
- Peter Tatchell
- Suran Dickson
- Richard Beaven
- Blake Skjellerup

On 12 July 2012, a new project for a Pride House at the 2012 Olympics was announced. The event took place from 3–7 August at CA House on Limehouse Basin, with activities in other venues up until 12 August, the day of closing ceremony. This new project was managed by Pride Sports UK with financial support from the European Gay and Lesbian Sports Federation and the Gay and Lesbian International Sport Association. Other organisations involved included Federation of Gay Games, the LGBT Consortium, and Pride House Foundation.

=== Sochi Winter Olympics 2014 attempt ===
An attempt to obtain a Pride House at the 2014 Winter Olympics in Sochi, Russia was struck down by the Ministry of Justice, which refused to approve the registration of the NGO set up to organize the Pride House. The ban was upheld by Krasnodar Krai Judge Svetlana Mordovina on the basis of the Pride House inciting "propaganda of non-traditional sexual orientation which can undermine the security of the Russian society and the state, provoke social-religious hatred, which is the feature of the extremist character of the activity".

As it became clear that no Pride House could take place in Sochi, a number of leading LGBT sports organisations got together to promote the idea of cities elsewhere hosting their own Pride Houses during the Sochi Olympics. Pride House Toronto, which was being planned for the 2015 Pan American Games in Toronto, was already very advanced with its plans for a series of events during the Sochi Olympics highlighting the anti-LGBT laws and LGBT rights in general. In addition to Pride House Toronto, a group led by Pride Sports UK hosted other Pride Houses of which Manchester was the largest. Vancouver (Whistler), Los Angeles, San Francisco, Washington, Chicago, Cleveland, Toronto, Montreal, Philadelphia, Glasgow, Manchester, London, Copenhagen, Paris, Brussels, Utrecht, Amsterdam, Wellington, São Paulo, and Brasilia have also expressed interest.

=== Glasgow Commonwealth Games 2014 ===
A Pride House was confirmed for the 2014 Commonwealth Games in Glasgow, with the Scottish government pledging £25,000 to the effort.

=== Toronto Pan American Games 2015 ===
The PrideHouseTO Initiative is a comprehensive, province-wide engagement and activation strategy for the lesbian, gay, bi, trans, queer (LGBTQ) communities in Ontario during and leading up to the 2015 Pan American Games. The initiative is a collaboration of over 12 organizations representing social services, education, government, labour, business and sport and recreation sectors. This initiative has been planned for the 2015 Pan American Games in Toronto and this would be the second time that a Pride House has been provided for a multi-sport event in North America after the 2010 Olympic Games in Vancouver.

PrideHouseTO opened July 8, 2015 and ran until July 26 at The 519 and Barbara Hall Park in the Church and Wellesley neighbourhood of Toronto. The venue was officially opened by out Canadian soccer player Erin McLeod and Toronto city councillor Kristyn Wong-Tam.

Smaller Pride Houses were also held in numerous other Ontario cities, as a way to expand the visibility of LGBT issues in sport. At least 15 "ambassadors" were trained by the Pride House committee to organize local events in their home cities.

=== PyeongChang Winter Olympics 2018 ===
After local organizers failed to secure South Korean government support or sufficient private funding, the Canadian Olympic Committee entered an agreement with Pride House International to host a Pride House during the PyeongChang Olympics. A corner of Canada Olympic House was set aside as an open-access Pride House for the duration of the games.

=== 2023 FIFA Women's World Cup ===
A Pride House operated during the 2023 FIFA Women's World Cup in Australia and New Zealand. The venue aimed to create a safe environment for LGBTIQ+ supporters, athletes, staff, and volunteers.

=== Paris Summer Olympics 2024 ===
The Paris Olympics hosted a Pride House for the 191 LGBTQ athletes and supporters. It was located in a boat on the Seine.

=== 2026: FIFA World Cup ===
For the 2026 FIFA World Cup, the initiative is organized under the name "Pride House United 2026." The planned network encompasses 16 host cities across Canada, Mexico, and the United States

== Governance ==
The global network is overseen by Pride House International, an umbrella organization registered as a charity in Scotland.
