= Helga Niemann =

German swimmer

Personal information
- Born: 7 February 1956 (age 70) Bonn, Germany

Sport
- Sport: Swimming

Helga Niemann (born 7 February 1956) is a German former swimmer. She competed in the women's 400 metre individual medley at the 1972 Summer Olympics.
