= Angela Coughlan =

Canadian swimmer (1952–2009)

Personal information
- Full name: Angela Denise Coughlan
- National team: Canada
- Born: October 4, 1952 London, Ontario, Canada
- Died: June 14, 2009 (aged 56) Ottawa, Ontario, Canada
- Height: 1.68 m (5 ft 6 in)
- Weight: 59 kg (130 lb)

Sport
- Sport: Swimming
- Strokes: Freestyle
Medal record
Women's swimming
Representing Canada
Olympic Games
Bronze medal – third place	1968 Mexico City	4×100 m freestyle
Commonwealth Games
Gold medal – first place	1970 Edinburgh	100 m freestyle
Silver medal – second place	1970 Edinburgh	200 m freestyle
Silver medal – second place	1970 Edinburgh	4×100 m freestyle
Bronze medal – third place	1970 Edinburgh	4×100 m medley
Pan American Games
Gold medal – first place	1971 Cali	4×100 m medley
Silver medal – second place	1967 Winnipeg	4×100 m freestyle
Silver medal – second place	1971 Cali	100 m freestyle
Silver medal – second place	1971 Cali	200 m freestyle
Silver medal – second place	1971 Cali	4×100 m freestyle
Bronze medal – third place	1967 Winnipeg	200 m freestyle
Bronze medal – third place	1967 Winnipeg	400 m freestyle
Bronze medal – third place	1967 Winnipeg	800 m freestyle
Bronze medal – third place	1971 Cali	400 m freestyle

Angela Denise Coughlan, O.Ont. (October 4, 1952 – June 14, 2009) was a Canadian competition swimmer. At the peak of her competitive swimming career from 1968 to 1971, she was the best Canadian female freestyle specialist, going undefeated in freestyle events at Canadian meets during that time, as well as breaking a world record and 13 Canadian national long course records. As a member of the Canadian national swim team, she anchored the 4x100-metre freestyle and 4x100-metre medley relay teams, and earned both individual and team relay medals at the 1967 Pan American Games, the 1968 Olympics, the 1970 Commonwealth Games and the 1971 Pan American Games. Named Canadian Female Athlete of the Year in 1970, she retired from competitive swimming in 1972 at the age of 19. Part of her post-competitive career was spent as a swim coach and mentor to younger swimmers. She was inducted into the Ontario Aquatic Hall of Fame and the Canadian Olympic Hall of Fame.

== Early life ==
Angela Coughlan was born in London, Ontario, before moving to Burlington, Ontario at the age of 7, where she attended Elizabeth Gardens Public School and M.M. Robinson High School. While still quite young, she showed early promise as a swimmer, and including the ability to set aside everything in order to practice.

== Competitive Swimming ==
Coughlan qualified for the Canadian national swim team in 1966 at the age of 14, and first competed for Canada at the 1967 Pan American Games in Winnipeg, Manitoba, where she won a silver in the 4x100-metre freestyle relay, and bronze medals in the 200, 400 and 800-metre freestyle.

At the 1968 Summer Olympics in Mexico City, she swam in four individual events as well as the relays. Despite fighting a stomach ailment, she qualified for the finals in all four individual freestyle events, finishing 7th in the 100, 200 and 400-metre freestyle, and 6th in the 800-metre freestyle. Coughlan won a bronze medal as a member of Canada's third-place team in the women's 4x100-metre freestyle relay, together with teammates Marilyn Corson, Elaine Tanner and Marion Lay.

At the 1970 Commonwealth Games in Edinburgh, Scotland, Coughlan earned a gold medal in the 100-metre freestyle, silvers in the 200-metre freestyle, 400-metre freestyle, and 4x100-metre freestyle relay, and a bronze in the 4x100-metre medley relay. For this effort, she was named the 1970 Canadian Female Athlete of the Year and Canadian Female Swimmer of the Year.

At the 1971 Pan American Games in Cali, Colombia, she earned a gold medal anchoring the 4x100-metre medley relay, and three silvers (4x100-metre freestyle relay, 100-metre freestyle, 200-metre freestyle).

During the peak of her swimming career, Coughlan was, in the words of the Canadian Olympic Committee, "Canada's best female freestyle specialist," winning 23 Canadian championships and sweeping all Canadian freestyle events from 1968 to 1971. During that time, she broke 13 Canadian long-course freestyle records and one world record.

== Retirement from swimming and later life ==
Coughlan retired from competitive swimming in 1972 while still a teenager. That same year, her home city of Burlington opened a new swimming facility attached to her high school that included an indoor 6-lane 25-metre swimming pool. It was named the Angela Coughlan Indoor Pool, an honour that embarrassed the shy 19-year-old.

The following year she married fellow Olympic swimmer Tom Arusoo, and they had three daughters before the couple divorced ten years later. She later married Lynn Patrick Sharp.

Coughlan spent much of the 1970s as a swim coach before becoming a massage therapist, and was a familiar sight at competitive swim meets for the next 20 years.

In recognition of her efforts in the pool, Coughlan was inducted into the Ontario Aquatic Hall of Fame in 1992, the Order of Ontario in 1995, and the Burlington Hall of Fame in 2008.

She was diagnosed with multiple myeloma in 2005. A stem cell transplant was initially successful, but she suffered a relapse and succumbed in 2009 at the age of 56, only days before she was to be recognized at the annual Celebration of Significant People Concert in Hamilton, Ontario.

== Recognition and legacy ==
- 1970: Canadian Female Athlete of the Year and Canadian Female Swimmer of the Year
- 1972: Angela Coughlan Indoor Pool opens in Burlington, Ontario
- 1977: Canadian Olympic Hall of Fame
- 1992: Ontario Aquatic Hall of Fame
- 1995: Order of Ontario
- 2008: Burlington Hall of Fame

== See also ==
- List of Olympic medalists in swimming (women)
- List of Commonwealth Games medallists in swimming (women)
