= Anita Lallande =

Puerto Rican swimmer (1949–2021)

Personal information
- Full name: Ann Lucile Lallande
- Nationality: Puerto Rico
- Born: June 24, 1949 San Juan, Puerto Rico
- Died: December 19, 2021 (aged 72) Annapolis, Maryland, U.S.
- Height: 1.65 m (5 ft 5 in)
- Weight: 52 kg (115 lb)

Sport
- Sport: Swimming
- Strokes: Freestyle, Butterfly
Medal record
Women's swimming
Representing Puerto Rico
Pan American Games
Bronze medal – third place	1967 Winnipeg	4x100 m freestyle

Anita Lallande (June 24, 1949 – December 19, 2021) was a Puerto Rican Olympic swimmer, who holds the record for the most medals won at the Central American and Caribbean Games.

== Early years ==
Lallande was born in San Juan, Puerto Rico, to Joseph Gustave Lallande Jr. and Janice Hoover. Her father was Chairman of the Board of J. Gus Lallande Inc., a food brokerage and distribution business in Puerto Rico. When she was 8 years old, she began her career as a swimmer at the Caparra Country Club.

== Central American and Caribbean Games ==
The Central American and Caribbean Games (or CACs) are a multi-sport regional championship event, held quadrennially (every 4 years), typically in the even-numbered year between consecutive Summer Olympics. The Games are for countries in Central America, the Caribbean, Mexico, Bermuda, and the South American countries of Surinam, Guyana, Colombia and Venezuela.

In 1962, at the age of 13, Lallande made her Olympic debut representing Puerto Rico at the Central American and Caribbean Games held in Kingston, Jamaica and won two Silver and three Bronze medals in swimming. In 1963, she competed in the Pan-American Games held in São Paulo, Brazil and in 1964 in the Olympics held in Tokyo, Japan.

In 1966, the swimming competitions of the Central American and Caribbean Games were held at the Escambrón Olympic swimming pool in San Juan, Puerto Rico. She arrived first in eight individual events and participated in two winning relays. She won a bronze medal in the Medley relay events (200 m and 400 m) in which Margaret Harding, also Puerto Rican, won the gold. Lallande dominated the tests of velocity in the 100 and 200 m's freestyle, in two of the 400 and 800 m's freestyle, the 100 and 200 m's butterfly and the 100 and 200 meters backstroke. Lallande won a total of 10 Gold, 1 Silver and 1 Bronze medal for a total of twelve medals, making her the person with the most medals won that year.

From 1962 to 1966, Lallande won a total of 17 medals, thus holding the record for most medals won in swimming competitions at the Central American and Caribbean Games.

== Later life and death ==
After the games, Lallande announced her retirement from all sports activities and moved to New York City. Was married to retired US Navy officer Robert C. Giffen, III, She later relocated to Annapolis, Maryland, where she died on December 19, 2021, at the age of 72. She was buried at the Arlington National Cemetery.

== See also ==
- List of Puerto Ricans
- Sports in Puerto Rico
- History of women in Puerto Rico
