= Sabine Steinbach =

German former swimmer (born 1952)

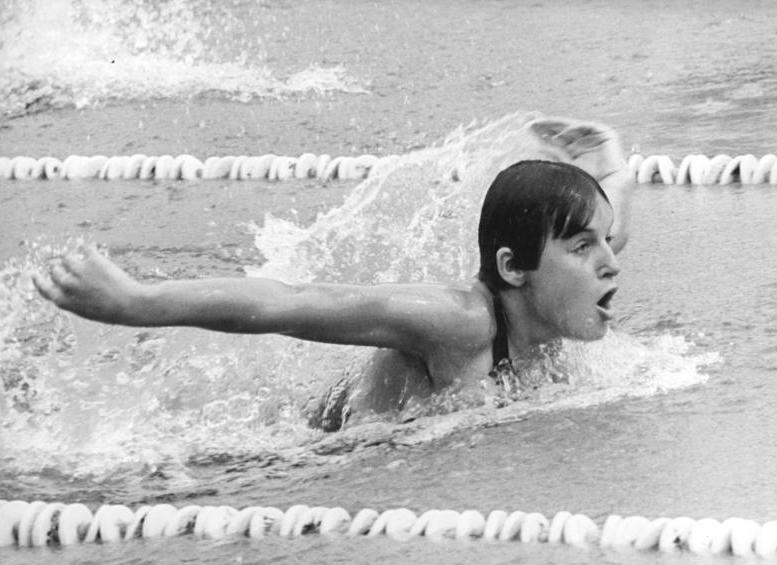
- Sabine Steinbach in 1969

Personal information
- Born: 18 July 1952 (age 73) Chemnitz, East Germany
- Height: 1.64 m (5 ft 5 in)
- Weight: 56 kg (123 lb)

Sport
- Sport: Swimming
- Club: SC Karl-Marx-Stadt
Medal record
Representing East Germany
Olympic Games
Bronze medal – third place	1968 Mexico City	400 m medley

Sabine Steinbach (later Klemm, born 18 July 1952) is a German former swimmer. She competed at the 1968 Summer Olympics in the 200 m and 400 m individual medley events and finished in fourth and third place, respectively.
