= Jenny Bartz =

American swimmer (born 1955)

Personal information
- Full name: Jennifer Ann Bartz
- Nickname: "Jenny"
- National team: United States
- Born: July 23, 1955 (age 70) Wilmington, Delaware, U.S.
- Height: 5 ft 7 in (1.70 m)
- Weight: 134 lb (61 kg)

Sport
- Sport: Swimming
- Strokes: Individual medley
- Club: Santa Clara Swim Club
- College team: University of Miami; University of California, Los Angeles
- Coach: Bob Mattson (Wilmington Aquatics); Bill Diaz (University of Miami); George Haines (Santa Clara, UCLA)

Jennifer Ann Bartz (born July 23, 1955), also known by her married name Jennifer McGillin, is an American former competition swimmer who took fourth place at the 200 and 400-meter individual medley, for the United States at the 1972 Summer Olympics in Munich, Germany. Later, swimming for the University of Miami as one of the first women to receive a collegiate swimming scholarship, she helped lead the team to the AIAW national collegiate swimming championships in 1975, before transferring to swim for Hall of Fame coach George Haines at UCLA her Junior and Senior year.

== Early swimming highlights ==
In Delaware, she swam with the Wilmington Aquatics Club where she was mentored by ASCA Hall of Fame Coach Bob Mattson.

While training with the nationally recognized Santa Clara Swim Club, though a Delaware resident, she attended Fremont High School in Sunnyvale, California. She won AAU titles in the 400 IM in outdoor competition in 1971 and 1973, and won an AAU indoor title in the 1972 200-yard IM. Her 400-meter IM time in the 1973 AAU long course outdoor competition was 5:08.735.

Swimming for the Santa Clara Swim Club under Hall of Fame Head Coach George Haines at the Los Angeles Invitational Tournament in August 1971, Bartz finished first in the 800-meter freestyle relay, and fourth in the 400-meter IM with a 5:18.38. At the Santa Clara Invitational in July 1971, Bartz placed third in the 200-meter IM with a 2:20.2.

== 1972 Summer Olympics ==
On August 2, 1972 at the Olympic Trials in Chicago, Bartz qualified for the Women's 200-meter individual medley with a time of 2:24.51.

Bartz competed in both individual medley events. She finished fourth in the finals of the women's 200-meter individual medley with a time of 2:24.55. She also advanced to the finals of the women's 400-meter individual medley, but again fell just short of a medal with a fourth-place performance with a time of 5:06.56.

In April 1973, she won the 400-meter Individual Medley at the Coca-Cola National Meet in London England.

== University of Miami swimming ==
Bartz attended the University of Miami in Coral Gables, Florida, and swam for the Miami Hurricanes swimming and diving team on an athletic scholarship beginning in the fall of 1973. She was one of the first women swimmers to be extended an athletic scholarship which primarily covered tuition, and the pioneering move by the University of Miami greatly improved the standing of their women's team. With the exceptional skills of the newly recruited women's scholarship swimmers, during Bartz's swimming tenure, Head Coach Bill Diaz led the Women's team to back-to-back Intercollegiate Athletics' National championships in 1975 and 1976, establishing Miami as one of the nation's leading swimming and diving programs. Bartz's 1975 team in combination with the diving squads won six individual national titles for Miami, which was the most ever received in a single year.

=== 1975 Collegiate national championships ===
In an exceptionally tight race at the 1975 Intercollegiate National AAU Championship in March 1975, Bartz finished only a half second behind the first-place competitor, with a 2:11.45 in the 200-yard individual medley. She swam on the winning 400 Medley relay team at the same 1975 National Championships who received a combined time of 4:40.82.

== UCLA swimming ==
Bartz transferred from Miami in the fall of 1975, to the University of California at Los Angeles (UCLA). Bartz transferred to UCLA partly to swim for Hall of Fame coach George Haines, the new UCLA men's coach, who she had swum with earlier in High School. At UCLA, she was also mentored by Women's coach Colleen Graham by her Junior Year. At the 1976 Nationals in Fort Lauderdale, Bartz qualified for six events. At UCLA she swam with seven collegiate all Americans. Olympians on the team included Ann Simmons, a 1972 Olympian and former world record holder in the 800-meter freestyle, and Karen Moe, a 1972 gold medalist in the 200-meter butterfly. The Bruins had won the Southern California Intercollegiate Athletic Conference team championship by a landslide.

At the March 1976 AIAW Women's National Championships in Fort Lauderdale, Florida, UCLA took second place team honors to first University of Miami, Bartz's former team.

== See also ==
- List of University of Miami alumni
