= Leslie Cliff (swimmer) =

Canadian swimmer (born 1955)

Personal information
- Full name: Leslie G. Cliff
- National team: Canada
- Born: March 11, 1955 (age 71) Vancouver, British Columbia, Canada
- Height: 1.73 m (5 ft 8 in)
- Weight: 60 kg (132 lb)

Sport
- Sport: Swimming
- Strokes: Backstroke, butterfly, freestyle, medley
- Club: Canadian Dolphin Swim Club
- College team: Arizona State University
Medal record
Women's swimming
Representing Canada
Olympic Games
| Silver medal – second place | 1972 Munich | 400 m medley |
British Commonwealth Games
| Gold medal – first place | 1974 Christchurch | 200 m medley |
| Gold medal – first place | 1974 Christchurch | 400 m medley |
Pan American Games
| Gold medal – first place | 1971 Cali | 200 m medley |
| Gold medal – first place | 1971 Cali | 400 m medley |
| Gold medal – first place | 1971 Cali | 4×100 m medley |
| Silver medal – second place | 1971 Cali | 100 m butterfly |
| Silver medal – second place | 1971 Cali | 4×100 m freestyle |

Leslie G. Cliff, OC (born March 11, 1955), later known by her married name Leslie Tindle, is a Canadian former competitive swimmer who participated in the Olympics, Commonwealth Games and Pan American Games.

== Swimming career ==
She competed at the 1970 British Commonwealth Games and won two gold medals at the 1974 Commonwealth Games.

She was born in Vancouver, British Columbia, where she attended York House School. As a 17-year-old, she won the silver medal in the 400-metre individual medley at the 1972 Summer Olympics in Munich, Germany.

Despite being Canadian she won the 'Open' ASA National British Championships over 400 metres freestyle, the 800 metres freestyle title and both the 200 metres medley title and 400 metres medley title in 1974.

In 1971, Cliff was made an Officer of the Order of Canada. She was inducted into the BC Sports Hall of Fame in 1976, Canada's Sports Hall of Fame in 1984, and the Canadian Olympic Hall of Fame in 1997.

== See also ==
- List of Olympic medalists in swimming (women)
- List of Commonwealth Games medallists in swimming (women)
