= Swimming at the 1967 Pan American Games =

The Swimming competition at the 5th Pan American Games was held at the Pan Am Pool in Winnipeg, Manitoba, Canada, during the Games' run in 1967. It consisted of 29 long course (50 m) events: 15 for males and 14 for females:

The 1967 Pan Ams marked several firsts for the Games:

- It was the first time touch pads were used marking them to the hundredth-of-a-second (previous Games were to tenths-of-a-second only)
- It was the first time the Individual Medleys were swum;
- The 200 race distances for freestyle and backstroke were swum for the first time;
- The 100 meter Breaststroke was swum for the first time.
- Uruguay won, for the first time, medals in swimming: there were 3, won by the country's women's swimming.
- Puerto Rico also won, for the first time, a medal in swimming at the Pan American Games: a bronze in the women's 4 × 100 m free relay.

During the 1967 Pan Am Games in Winnipeg, 11 world records were beaten in swimming. It is the record of all editions of the championship, a record that will probably never be beaten.

== Results ==
=== Men ===
Event	Gold		Silver		Bronze	
100 Freestyle	Don Havens (United States) USA	53.79	Zac Zorn (United States) USA	53.97	Sandy Gilchrist; Canada	54.85
200 Freestyle	Don Schollander (United States) USA	1:56.01; WR	Ralph Hutton; Canada	1:58.44	Julio Arango; Colombia	2:01.77
400 Freestyle	Greg Charlton (United States) USA	4:10.23	Ralph Hutton; Canada	4:11.88	Mike Burton (United States) USA	4:15.74
1500 Freestyle	Mike Burton (United States) USA	16:44.40	Ralph Hutton; Canada	16:51.81	Andy Strenk (United States) USA	17:03.43
100 Backstroke	Charlie Hickcox (United States) USA	1:01.19	Fred Haywood (United States) USA	1:02.45	Jim Shaw; Canada	1:02.87
200 Backstroke	Ralph Hutton; Canada	2:12.55	Charlie Hickcox (United States) USA	2:13.05	Charles Goettsche (United States) USA	2:15.94
100 Breaststroke	José Sylvio Fiolo; Brazil	1:07.52	Russell Webb (United States) USA	1:09.13	Ken Merten (United States) USA	1:09.32
200 Breaststroke	José Sylvio Fiolo; Brazil	2:30.42	Robert Momsen (United States) USA	2:31.01	Ken Merten (United States) USA	2:34.17
100 Butterfly	Mark Spitz (United States) USA	56.20; WR	Ross Wales (United States) USA	57.04	Luis Nicolao; Argentina	58.63
200 Butterfly	Mark Spitz (United States) USA	2:06.42; WR	Tom Arusoo; Canada	2:10.70	Mike Burton (United States) USA	2:13.26
200 I.M.	Doug Russell (United States) USA	2:13.22	William Utley (United States) USA	2:13.68	Sandy Gilchrist; Canada	2:16.61
400 I.M.	William Utley (United States) USA	4:48.12	Ken Webb (United States) USA	4:50.89	Sandy Gilchrist; Canada	4:55.60
4 × 100; Free Relay	United States; Ken Walsh; Mike Fitzmaurice; Mark Spitz; Don Schollander	3:34.08	Canada; Ralph Hutton; Robert Kasting; Sandy Gilchrist; Ron Jacks	3:40.82	Argentina; Mario de Lucca; Carlos Van der Maath; Juan Carranza; Luis Nicolao	3:45.50
4 × 200; Free Relay	United States; Don Schollander; Charlie Hickcox; Greg Charlton; Mark Spitz	8:00.46	Canada; Sandy Gilchrist; Ron Jacks; Robert Kasting; Ralph Hutton	8:07.16	Argentina; Héctor Scerbo; Mario de Lucca; Carlos Van der Maath; Luis Nicolao	8:19.48
4 × 100; Medley Relay	United States; Doug Russell; Russell Webb; Mark Spitz; Ken Walsh	3:59.31	Canada; William Mahony; Sandy Gilchrist; Ron Jacks; Jim Shaw	4:04.29	Brazil; Ilson Asturiano; João Costa Lima Neto; José Sylvio Fiolo; Waldyr Ramos	4:06.64 SA

=== Women ===
Event	Gold		Silver		Bronze	
100 Freestyle	Erika Bricker (United States) USA	1:00.89	Marion Lay; Canada	1:01.02	Lillian Watson (United States) USA	1:01.54
200 Freestyle	Pam Kruse (United States) USA	2:11.91	Marion Lay; Canada	2:14.68	Angela Coughlan; Canada	2:15.66
400 Freestyle	Debbie Meyer (United States) USA	4:32.64; WR	Pam Kruse (United States) USA	4:42.81	Angela Coughlan; Canada	4:48.88
800 Freestyle	Debbie Meyer (United States) USA	9:22.86; WR	Susan Pedersen (United States) USA	9:38.37	Angela Coughlan; Canada	9:48.56
100 Backstroke	Elaine Tanner; Canada	1:07.32; WR	Kaye Hall (United States) USA	1:09.76	Shirley Cazalet; Canada	1:11.33
200 Backstroke	Elaine Tanner; Canada	2:24.55; WR	Kendis Moore (United States) USA	2:30.38	Cathy Ferguson (United States) USA	2:32.48
100 Breaststroke	Catie Ball (United States) USA	1:14.80; WR	Ana María Norbis; Uruguay	1:15.95	Cynthia Goyette (United States) USA	1:19.39
200 Breaststroke	Catie Ball (United States) USA	2:42.18	Claudia Kolb (United States) USA	2:48.93	Ana María Norbis; Uruguay	2:52.11
100 Butterfly	Ellie Daniel (United States) USA	1:05.24	Elaine Tanner; Canada	1:05.35	Marilyn Corson; Canada	1:07.68
200 Butterfly	Claudia Kolb (United States) USA	2:25.49	Lee Davis (United States) USA	2:26.74	Marilyn Corson; Canada	2:30.54
200 I.M.	Claudia Kolb (United States) USA	2:26.06; WR	Susan Pedersen (United States) USA	2:30.91	Sandra Dowler; Canada	2:36.18
400 I.M.	Claudia Kolb (United States) USA	5:09.68; WR	Susan Pedersen (United States) USA	5:21.57	Marilyn Corson; Canada	5:36.75
4 × 100; Free Relay	United States; Wendy Fordyce; Pam Carpinelli; Linda Gustavson; Pam Kruse	4:04.57	Canada; Marion Lay; Angela Coughlan; Elaine Tanner; Sandra Smith	4:09.73	Puerto Rico; Ana Marcial; Kristina Moir; Melanie Laporte; Anita Lallande	4:26.56
4 × 100; Medley Relay	United States; Kendis Moore; Catie Ball; Ellie Daniel; Wendy Fordyce	4:30.0; WR	Canada; Elaine Tanner; Donna Ross; Marilyn Corson; Marion Lay	4:40.88	Uruguay; Themis Trama; Ana Norbis; Lylian Castillo; Ruth Apt	4:49.27

== Medal table ==
Rank	Nation	Gold	Silver	Bronze	Total
1	United States	24	16	9	49
2	Canada	3	12	12	27
3	Brazil	2	0	1	3
4	Uruguay	0	1	2	3
5	Argentina	0	0	3	3
6	Colombia	0	0	1	1
6	Puerto Rico	0	0	1	1
Totals (7 entries)		29	29	29	87
