= Marilyn Corson =

Canadian swimmer (born 1950)

Personal information
- Full name: Marilyn Corson
- National team: Canada
- Born: June 6, 1950 (age 76) Parry Sound, Ontario
- Height: 1.67 m (5 ft 6 in)
- Weight: 60 kg (130 lb)
- Spouse: Mike Whitney m. 1972

Sport
- Sport: Swimming
- Strokes: Butterfly, freestyle, medley
- Club: London Aquatic Club
- College team: Michigan State University
Medal record
Women's swimming
Representing Canada
Olympic Games
Bronze medal – third place	1968 Mexico City	4x100 m freestyle
Pan American Games
Silver medal – second place	1967 Winnipeg	4x100 m medley
Bronze medal – third place	1967 Winnipeg	100 m butterfly
Bronze medal – third place	1967 Winnipeg	200 m butterfly
Bronze medal – third place	1967 Winnipeg	400 m medley

Marilyn Corson (born June 6, 1950), later known by her married name Marilyn Whitney, is a Canadian former competitive swimmer and 1968 Olympic Bronze medalist who swam for Michigan State and competed for Canada in both the 1968 and 1972 Summer Olympics. She later worked as an interior designer with her own company, and after obtaining a Doctorate worked as a professor of Art and Design at Savannah College of Art and Design and Adrian College in Michigan.

Corson was born on June 6, 1950, in Parry Sound, Ontario to Bruce Corson Sr. And Rose Mary Mann Corson Dawson, a highly rated swim coach. She was the granddaughter of Matthew Mann, an English-born Coach for the 1952 American Olympic team, and a long serving Hall of Fame Head Coach for the University of Michigan from 1925 to 1954. She was a step-daughter of Buck Dawson, Fort Lauderdale's international Swimming Hall of Fame director. Marilyn took up competitive swimming around the age of 6.

== High school swimming ==
Corson swam for the Jack Nelson Swim Club and attended and swam for the Pine Crest School beginning in the Fall of 1965, a college prep school with a highly rated swimming program in Fort Lauderdale, Florida, where she graduated in 1968. Both Pine Crest and the Jack Nelson Swim Club were coached by Hall of Fame Coach Jack Nelson. At Pine Crest, she was also coached by her mother RoseMary. In May, 1964, she made the Fort Lauderdale New's "Girls All-County Team" as a Sophomore swimming for Pine Crest in the 200-yard Individual Medley with a 2:23.7, and the 100-yard butterfly with a 1:00.4. Future accomplished distance swimmer Diana Nyad was a Pine Crest teammate in her Junior year who made the All County list in the 100-yard backstroke. In May 1968, as a Pine Crest Senior, Corson again made the All-County Team in the 200-yard Individual Medley. In her Senior Year, while Corson served as captain, the Pine Crest Panthers won the Southeastern High School championships by a large margin, and won the Woodson Invitational Crown. Pine Crest won all their dual meets in the four years Corson attended.

== Michigan State swimming ==
Marilyn was a swimmer for Michigan State University, where she graduated in 1972 with a Bachelor of Art, and in 1974 with a Master of Art. She did not swim with the Michigan team in her Freshman year, but trained more intensely with the team prior to the 1972 Olympics. While swimming for Michigan, Marilyn won both NCAA and Big 10 Conference titles. Michigan State had a powerful women's team with former Pine Crest teammate Pam Kruse, a 1968 Olympic silver medalist in the 800-meter freestyle, and Linda Gustavson, a 1968 Olympic 100-meter freestyle relay gold medalist and record holder. By 1970, the Michigan State women's team was rated among the top two in the country with Arizona State. Led by Corson, Michigan State won the University of Waterloo's International Meet, scoring 121 points to outplace seven other teams including second place University of Michigan. She placed first in the 100-yard individual medley, the 100-yard butterfly, her specialty, and the 50-yard butterfly.

== Early international competition ==
Corson's first high level competition was at the 1966 British Empire and Commonwealth Games, where she swam in the 4 x 100-meter medley relay where she won a silver medal. In the 1967 Pan American games in Winnipeg, Canada, Corson won a silver medal swimming as part of a 4×100 meter medley relay team, and took bronze medals in the 100-meter butterfly, 200-meter butterfly, and 400-meter medley.

== Olympics ==
At the 1968 Olympics in Mexico City, Corson won a bronze medal as a member of Canada's third-place team in the women's 4x100-metre freestyle relay, together with teammates Angela Coughlan, Elaine Tanner and Marion Lay. The Canadian 4 x 100 metre freestyle relay team swam a combined time of 4:07.2, 2.5 seconds behind the East German women's team that placed second. Dawson participated in but was eliminated in the preliminary heats of the 100-meter and 200-meter butterfly competitions. Marilyn noted that her Olympic preparation consisted of an average of 22 hours a week of training broken into 11 work outs.

Corson served as captain of Canada's Olympic team at the 1972 Summer Olympics. She finished seventh in Munich in the 4x100-meter medley relay swimming with Leslie Cliff, Wendy Cook-Hogg, and Sylvia Dockerill. In individual competition, she was excluded from the final round but made it to the semifinals of the 100-meter butterfly competition, though she swam a personal best time in her preliminary round. She married Mike Whitney, a student from Greenville, Michigan, on September 8, 1972, in Munich after Olympic competition was completed.

== Interior design career ==
After completing her Master's of Art from Michigan State, Corson began working as an Interior Designer in 1976, with Carters’ Designs She began her own company, Whitney Interiors Inc. (WII) in 1983. In her thirty five years of business with the company through 2015, she finished over 250 projects. Her company focused on corporate headquarters, university buildings, interiors for low income residents, and general residential interiors.

== Teaching ==
She began a Ph.D. program at Virginia Polytechnic Institute and State University in 2003, where she taught as a Graduate Teaching Assistant. In 2005, Whitney was a finalist for Outstanding Female Graduate Student. She completed a Ph.D. in Environmental Design and Planning in 2008. Her 2010 dissertation entitled, "Interior Design and Licensure: A History of the Process of Professionalism" was published by Verlag. In 2007, Whitney served as a professor at Savannah College of Art and Design and at Adrian College in 2011.

== See also ==
- List of Olympic medalists in swimming (women)
