= Ralph Hutton =

Canadian swimmer (born 1948)

Personal information
- Full name: Ralph Hutton
- National team: Canada
- Born: March 6, 1948 (age 78) Ocean Falls, British Columbia
- Height: 1.83 m (6 ft 0 in)
- Weight: 86 kg (190 lb)

Sport
- Sport: Swimming
- Strokes: Backstroke, butterfly, freestyle, medley
Medal record
Men's swimming
Representing Canada
Olympic Games
Silver medal – second place	1968 Mexico City	400 m freestyle
British Commonwealth Games
Gold medal – first place	1966 Kingston	4×100 yd medley
Silver medal – second place	1966 Kingston	110 yd backstroke
Silver medal – second place	1966 Kingston	220 yd backstroke
Silver medal – second place	1966 Kingston	440 yd medley
Silver medal – second place	1966 Kingston	4×110 yd freestyle
Silver medal – second place	1966 Kingston	4×220 yd freestyle
Silver medal – second place	1970 Edinburgh	200 m freestyle
Silver medal – second place	1970 Edinburgh	400 m freestyle
Silver medal – second place	1970 Edinburgh	4×100 m freestyle
Silver medal – second place	1970 Edinburgh	4×200 m freestyle
Bronze medal – third place	1966 Kingston	440 yd freestyle
Bronze medal – third place	1966 Kingston	1650 yd freestyle
Pan American Games
Gold medal – first place	1967 Winnipeg	200 m backstroke
Silver medal – second place	1963 São Paulo	4×200 m freestyle
Silver medal – second place	1967 Winnipeg	200 m freestyle
Silver medal – second place	1967 Winnipeg	400 m freestyle
Silver medal – second place	1967 Winnipeg	1500 m freestyle
Silver medal – second place	1967 Winnipeg	4×100 m freestyle
Silver medal – second place	1967 Winnipeg	4×200 m freestyle
Silver medal – second place	1971 Cali	4×200 m freestyle
Bronze medal – third place	1963 São Paulo	1500 m freestyle
Bronze medal – third place	1971 Cali	200 m freestyle
Bronze medal – third place	1971 Cali	400 m freestyle

Ralph Hutton (born March 6, 1948) is a former competition swimmer who represented Canada in three consecutive Olympic Games in 1964, 1968 and 1972. Hutton won a silver medal in the 400-metre freestyle at the 1968 Summer Olympics in Mexico City. Hutton won a total of 24 medals in international competitions, including the Summer Olympics, Commonwealth Games and Pan American Games. He was inducted in the International Swimming Hall of Fame as an "Honor Swimmer" in 1984.

== See also ==
- List of members of the International Swimming Hall of Fame
- List of Commonwealth Games medallists in swimming (men)
- List of Olympic medalists in swimming (men)
- World record progression 400 metres freestyle
