= Bill Diaz =

American swimming coach

Biographical details
- Born: August 1, 1925; New York, New York
- Died: September 18, 2014 (aged 89); Palmetto Bay, Florida
- Education: New York University

Coaching career (HC unless noted)
- 1953-1963: Miami Jackson Senior High
- 1964-1970: Miami Springs Senior High
- 1971-1984: University of Miami; Men's Team
- 1973-84: University of Miami; Women's Team

Accomplishments and honors

Championships
- Miami Jackson Senior High (5 State Championships); Miami Springs Senior High (4 State Championships); University of Miami Men (National Championships '74, '77, '82); University of Miami Women (National Championships 1975, 1976)

Awards
- 5 x Dade County High Coach of the Year; 1995 University of Miami Hall of Fame; 2020 Florida Sports Hall of Fame

Bill Diaz (August 1, 1925–September 18, 2014) was a high school and college swim coach, best known for coaching the University of Miami men's team from July 1970 to 1984, and leading them to National Championships in 1974, 1977, and 1982. Diaz started the first women's swim team at Miami in 1973, and soon led them to AIAW National Championships in 1975 and 1976. A year after passage of Title IX barring gender-based discrimination at federally funded colleges, Diaz was highly instrumental in making Miami the first American University to provide swimming scholarships to women.

He was born August 1, 1925, in New York City, New York, and grew up around Spanish Harlem. Diaz flew twenty combat missions over Japan as a WWII gunner in a B-29 while serving in the Air Force.

A graduate of New York University majoring in education, Bill married his wife Martha in September 1948, and had three sons. He did not swim competitively during his early years.

== High School Coaching ==
After moving to Miami in 1950, in 1953 he began working as a Physical Education teacher at Miami Jackson Senior High School, and soon began coaching the swim team around 1953-54. Diaz had never coached swimming but could swim and had worked as a Water Safety Instructor. Miami Jackson Athletic Director Roy French persuaded Diaz to take the first coaching position of his life partly by promising him a summer job as a pool manager at the local Allapatah YMCA, and assuring him he would have little pressure in the position as the school's swim coach.

Diaz studied a multitude of books on competitive swimming, attended clinics, and got help from Tom Lamar, who would later become University of Miami's first swim coach. By 1957, the Miami Jackson swim team had won the Florida state championship, and followed with four consecutive additional state championships, and Diaz would eventually coach a total of 38 High School All-Americans.

In 1963, Diaz began coaching Miami Springs Senior High, where he led the team to four more state championships, remaining with the team through around 1970.

In 1971, he started what would become a very strong age-group team, the Miami Hurricane Swim Club, which would practice at the University of Miami pool.

== University of Miami Head Coach ==
Diaz held the position as Head Coach of the University of Miami Men's and Women's swimming and diving teams for fourteen years, beginning officially from July 1970 through 1984. His swim teams captured four top-10 NCAA ratings in NCAA Championships and eleven times placed in the top-20 at the NCAA Championships. His accomplished men's teams won national championships in 1974, 1977 and 1982. Diaz coached fifty-five collegiate All-Americans during his tenure with Miami.

His top Miami men's swimmers endured overdistance training like most college swimming teams, and according to Diaz averaged around 9,000 yards in daily workouts in 1971, but Diaz was also considered an innovator in his coaching. Unlike many teams, Diaz had his men's team practice in the morning before an evening meet, averaging around 6,000 yards.

=== Women's team, 1973-1985 ===
In 1973, years before Title IX required federally funded colleges to offer women athletic scholarships, Diaz helped persuade the board at the University of Miami to become the first college to offer intercollegiate scholarships for women and started a Women's Team. With the exceptional skills of the newly recruited women's scholarship swimmers, Diaz led the Miami women to back-to-back NIAW National championships in 1975 and 1976, establishing Miami as one of the nation's leading swimming and diving programs for women. Bartz's 1975 Women's team in combination with the diving squads won six individual national titles for Miami, which was the most ever received in a single year. Diaz continued coaching the women's team through his tenure in 1984, and had his former Miami swimmer Ken Groce, as an assistant coach.

Olympians coached by Diaz at the University of Miami included 1984 Olympian and Hall of Fame medley swimmer Jesse Vassallo, '76 Olympic breaststroke gold medalist David Wilkie, '84 Olympian Matt Gribble and '76 Olympic IM swimmer Jenny Bartz.

=== Miami women's national championships ===
==== 1975 AIAW Women's national championship ====
With the help of seven swimming scholarships, the 1975 Miami Women's team included freestyle sprinting star Dawn Frady, butterfly and freestyle swimmer Sharon Berg, breaststroker J.B. Buchanon and 1972 Munich Olympic medley competitor Jenny Bartz. The team handily won the 1975 National Intercollegiate championship in Phoenix, Arizona with additional help from backstroker Pat Hines. Jenny Bartz was one of Miami's more outstanding competitors that year, and finished only a half second behind the first-place competitor in the 200-yard individual medley at the meet, receiving a time of 2:11.45. Bartz also swam on the winning 400m Medley relay team at the 1975 Gold Coast AAU Swimming Championships the week earlier at the university pool with the Miami Women's team finishing in a combined time of 4:40.82.

==== 1976 AIAW Women's national championship ====
Diaz's coaching was a likely factor in the success of the Women's team, as despite facing tough competition from a UCLA Women's team that had three former Olympians, including 1972 Olympic 800-meter freestyler Ann Simmons and 1972 Olympic 200-butterfly gold medalist Karen Moe, seven collegiate All-Americans, and world record holders, Diaz's Miami women won the Women's March 1976 AIAW National Championship in Fort Lauderdale with UCLA taking second, and Stanford third.

Diaz was a staff member or manager for five USA National swimming teams, that included the American team that took first at the 1982 World Aquatics Championships in Guayaquil, Ecuador over rival East Germany and the Soviet Union. His butterfly swimmer Matt Gribble, and diver Greg Louganis both took medals in the competition.

== Miami Diving team ==
By 1971, Diaz had improved Miami's Diving team by helping to recruit 1964 Olympic Bronze medalist from Ohio State, Tom Gumpf, as team coach and director. Gompf recruited exceptional Olympian Greg Louganis to swim for Miami.

After retiring as a swim coach, among other jobs, Diaz worked as a travel agent, and particularly enjoyed bringing University of Miami football fans to road games.

Diaz died at his home in Palmetto Bay, Florida on September 18, 2014, at the age of 89.

== Honors ==
Diaz was inducted into the Florida Sports Hall of Fame in 2020, and the University of Miami Sports Hall of Fame in 1995. In 2007, the University of Miami and Coral Gables honored Diaz by installing an electronic scoreboard at UM's Norman Whitten Student Union Pool, named in Diaz's honor.
