= Pam Kruse =

American swimmer (born 1950)

Personal information
- Full name: Pamela Jean Kruse
- Nickname: "Pam"
- National team: United States
- Born: June 3, 1950 (age 76) Miami, Florida, U.S.
- Height: 5 ft 5 in (1.65 m)
- Weight: 130 lb (59 kg)

Sport
- Sport: Swimming
- Strokes: Freestyle
- Club: Fort Lauderdale Swim Association
- College team: Michigan State University
Medal record
Women's swimming
Representing the United States
Olympic Games
Silver medal – second place	1968 Mexico City	800 m freestyle
Pan American Games
Gold medal – first place	1967 Winnipeg	200 m freestyle
Gold medal – first place	1967 Winnipeg	4×100 m freestyle
Silver medal – second place	1967 Winnipeg	400 m freestyle

Pamela Jean Kruse (born June 3, 1950) is an American former competition swimmer, Olympic medalist, and former world record-holder in two events.

Kruse attended and swam for Pine Crest High School in Fort Lauderdale, Florida, a highly competitive program, where she was trained by Hall of Fame Coach Jack Nelson. Her Pine Crest teammate Marilyn Corson, a 1968 Olympic bronze medalist from Canada, would later swim with her at Michigan State.

Kruse represented the United States as an 18-year-old at the 1968 Summer Olympics in Mexico City, where she competed in two freestyle events. She received a silver medal for her second-place performance in the women's 800-meter freestyle (9:35.7), finishing behind American teammate Debbie Meyer (9:24.0). She also swam in the women's 400-meter freestyle and placed fourth in the event final, and recorded a time of 4:37.2.

After the Olympics, Kruse attended Michigan State University with fellow Olympians Linda Gustavson, and 1968 Canadian Olympic bronze medalist Marilyn Corson. Gustavson and Kruse were members of the Kappa Alpha Theta sorority together. Kruse swam for the Michigan State Spartans swimming and diving team in Big Ten Conference competition, where she won conference championships in the 100- and 200-yard freestyle, and the 400-yard freestyle relay in 1971. She graduated from Michigan State with her bachelor's degree in 1973, master's in 1975, and Ph.D. in 1979.

== See also ==
- List of Michigan State University people
- List of Olympic medalists in swimming (women)
- World record progression 200 metres freestyle
- World record progression 400 metres freestyle

Records
Preceded by Martha Randall	Women's 400-meter freestyle world record-holder (long course); June 30, 1967 – July 27, 1967	Succeeded by Debbie Meyer
Preceded by Lillian Watson	Women's 200-meter freestyle world record-holder (long course); August 19, 1967 – July 6, 1968	Succeeded by Susan Pedersen
