= Claudia Kolb =

American swimmer (born 1949)

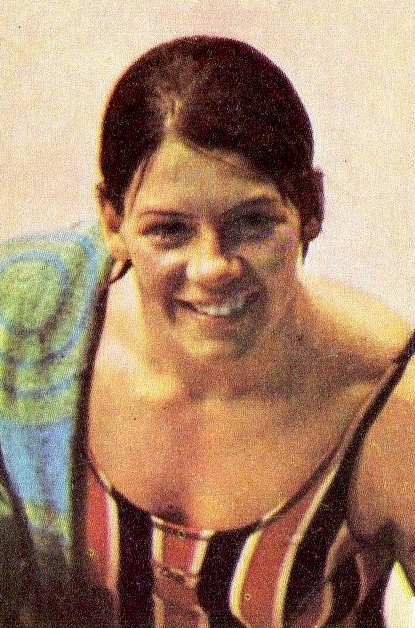
- Kolb in 1970

Personal information
- Full name: Claudia Anne Kolb
- National team: United States
- Born: December 19, 1949 (age 76) Hayward, California, U.S.
- Occupations: Swim Coach (Santa Clara SC) (Stanford University) (Pacific University)
- Height: 5 ft 7 in (1.70 m)
- Weight: 134 lb (61 kg)

Sport
- Sport: Swimming
- Strokes: Breaststroke, individual medley
- Club: Santa Clara Swim Club
- Coach: George Haines
Medal record
Women's swimming
Representing the United States
Olympic Games
Gold medal – first place	1968 Mexico City	200 m medley
Gold medal – first place	1968 Mexico City	400 m medley
Silver medal – second place	1964 Tokyo	200 m breaststroke
Pan American Games
Gold medal – first place	1967 Winnipeg	200 m medley
Gold medal – first place	1967 Winnipeg	400 m medley
Gold medal – first place	1967 Winnipeg	200 m butterfly
Silver medal – second place	1967 Winnipeg	200 m breaststroke

Claudia Anne Kolb (born December 19, 1949), also known by her married name Claudia Thomas, is an American former competition swimmer, swim coach, two-time Olympic champion, and former world record-holder in four events.

Born in Haywood, California, Kolb was a graduate of Santa Clara High school and trained with the Santa Clara Swim Club from the age of ten until the end of her Olympic career.

== Olympic swimming ==
Kolb represented the United States as a 14-year-old at the 1964 Summer Olympics in Tokyo, Japan. She competed in the women's 200-meter breaststroke, and received the silver medal for her second-place performance (2:47.6) behind Soviet Galina Prozumenshchikova, who set a new Olympic record (2:46.4). She became the first American woman to win an Olympic medal in the breaststroke.

When Mexico City hosted the 1968 Summer Olympics, Kolb won two gold medals. She dominated her competition in the medley events, winning both the women's 200-meter individual medley (2:24.7) and women's 400-meter individual medley (5:08.5). Kolb set new Olympic records in both events in the preliminary heats and the event finals.

== Achievements and honors ==
During her career. Kolb won 25 U.S. national AAU Championships and set 23 world records. In 1967 she was named "World Swimmer of the Year" by Swimming World magazine. In 1975 she was inducted into the International Swimming Hall of Fame. In 1999, she was inducted into the San Jose Sports Hall of Fame.

== Coaching ==
Kolb retired from competitive swimming after the Mexico City Olympics in 1968. She has coached swimming at clubs in South Bend, Indiana and Santa Clara, California, and college teams at Stanford University and Pacific University. Her Stanford women's swim team won the 1980 AIAW national team championship. She coached Stanford from 1979-1980, attaining a 7-1 winning record before leaving the team to spend more time with her family. In 2003, she was announced as the head coach of Pacific University's women's swimming program by athletic director Judy Sherman, but resigned in 2004 to attend to family concerns.

She lives in Oregon.

== See also ==
- List of Olympic medalists in swimming (women)
- World record progression 100 metres breaststroke
- World record progression 200 metres individual medley
- World record progression 400 metres individual medley
- World record progression 4 × 100 metres medley relay

Records
Preceded by Lynn Vidali	Women's 200-meter individual medley world record-holder (long course); August 21, 1966 – August 28, 1972	Succeeded by Shane Gould
Preceded by Donna de Varona	Women's 400-meter individual medley world record-holder (long course); July 9, 1967 – July 9, 1972	Succeeded by Gail Neall
