= Marion Lay =

Canadian swimmer

Personal information
- Full name: Marion Beverly Lay
- National team: Canada
- Born: November 26, 1948 (age 77) Vancouver, British Columbia, Canada
- Height: 1.68 m (5 ft 6 in)
- Weight: 61 kg (134 lb)

Sport
- Sport: Swimming
- Strokes: Freestyle
Medal record
Women's swimming
Representing Canada
Olympic Games
Bronze medal – third place	1968 Mexico City	4×100 m freestyle
Pan American Games
Silver medal – second place	1967 Winnipeg	100 m freestyle
Silver medal – second place	1967 Winnipeg	200 m freestyle
Silver medal – second place	1967 Winnipeg	4x100 m freestyle
Silver medal – second place	1967 Winnipeg	4x100 m medley
British Empire and Commonwealth Games
Gold medal – first place	1966 Kingston	110 yd freestyle
Gold medal – first place	1966 Kingston	4×110 yd freestyle
Silver medal – second place	1966 Kingston	4×110 yd medley

Marion Beverly Lay, OBC (born November 26, 1948) is a former competitive swimmer who represented Canada in the 1964 Summer Olympics and 1968 Summer Olympics. Swimming the anchor leg for Canada's third-place team in the women's 4x100-metre freestyle relay, she won an Olympic bronze medal, together with teammates Angela Coughlan, Marilyn Corson and Elaine Tanner.

== Swimming career ==
Through the 1960s and 1970s, Canada produced a remarkable number of world-class swimmers and Lay is notable for her contributions to that success. Despite a political squabble concerning her eligibility to compete for Canada, she reigned as Canadian 100 metres freestyle champion for four straight years from 1964 to 1967 and held the national record in the event for eight years, from 1964 to 1972. At the 1964 Tokyo Olympics, she finished fifth in 100m freestyle. Four years later in Mexico City, she placed fourth in the event. Other notable results include gold medals in 110yd freestyle and 4×110 yd freestyle relay, the latter in world record time, at the 1966 British Empire and Commonwealth Games. At the 1967 Pan American Games, Lay won four silver medals. She won the 1965 ASA National Championship 100 metres freestyle title.

== TV career ==
Following retirement from competition, Lay was CBC's swimming colour commentator until 1973. As a coach of women swimmers, she held positions at California State Polytechnic College in Pomona, California State University at Hayward, the University of Western Ontario, and the Ottawa Kingfish Swim Club.

== Activism ==
Lay is a leading activist in eliminating inequities faced by women in sport. She was the consultant for the first women and sport program at Fitness and Amateur Sport Canada and later became Sport Canada's special advisor on gender equity. She is a founder of the Canadian Association for the Advancement of Women and Sport and Physical Activity (CAAWS; WomenSport International; PromotionPlus, British Columbia's organization for girls and women in physical activity and sport; the National Sport Centre Greater Vancouver (Canadian Sport Institute Pacific); and was founding President and chief executive officer of 2010 Legacies Now. She was an organizer of Canada's first Women and Sport Conference in 1974 and a member of the steering committee for the 1st World Conference on Women and Sport, which developed the Brighton Declaration in 1994. In 2015, she was a member of the planning committee for the National Conversation on Women in Sport at Laval University in Quebec City. She served on the executive committee of the Canadian Olympic Committee and was President of Operations for Rick Hansen's Man in Motion World Tour.

=== Honors for advocacy ===
Over the years, Lay's advocacy has not gone unnoticed. Her honours include the 2001 International Olympic Committee's Women and Sport Trophy for the Americas; the inaugural Carol Anne Letheren International Sport Leadership Award in 2002, acknowledging a Canadian woman who has made an outstanding contribution to international sport leadership; the Order of British Columbia in 2012; the Leadership in Sports Award at the 2001 Canadian Sport Awards; and the 1995 Bryce Taylor Memorial Award for Outstanding Contribution to Canadian sport. Lay was inducted into Canada's Sports Hall of Fame as a Builder in 2012, the BC Sports Hall of Fame and Museum as a Builder in 2005; the BC Swimming Hall of Fame as a Builder in 2003, the California State Polytechnic College Sports Hall of Fame for swimming, basketball, and volleyball in 1991, and the Aquatic Hall of Fame and Museum of Canada as an athlete in 1972. She received the Vancouver YWCA Women of Distinction Award in 1991, the Bobbie Steen Award of Excellence for leadership in women in sport in 2001, and the CAAWS Women in Sport Herstorical Award (now the Marion Lay Herstorical Award) in 2002. She was a recipient of the Queen Elizabeth II Golden Jubilee Medal in 2002 and the Queen Elizabeth II Diamond Jubilee Medal in 2012.

== Contributions to olympics and Paralympics ==
Lay was heavily involved with the Vancouver 2010 Olympic and Paralympic Winter Games, serving first as the Chair of the Vancouver 2010 Bid Committee and later as the City of Vancouver representative on the Board of Directors of the Vancouver 2010 Organizing Committee. She was also President and CEO of the 2010 Legacies Now Society. She is President of Think Sport Ltd., a Vancouver-based sport management and consulting firm specializing in event management, program planning, evaluation, and gender equity education.

== Personal life ==
Lay is an adjunct professor in the School of Human Kinetics at the University of British Columbia, a member of the Board of Directors of ParticipACTION, and co-chair and honorary board member of the BC Games Society. She was a member of the steering committee for the Vancouver 2010 Pride House and sat on the advisory committee of the City of Vancouver LGBTQ mission to the 2014 Sochi Winter Olympic and Paralympic Games advocating that sexual orientation be included in the International Olympic Committee Charter.

An editor of Playing it Forward: Women and Sport in Canada, published by the Feminist History Society and Second Story Press in 2012, Lay was also a contributor to Play Fair, the feature-length documentary on women and sport in Canada produced in 2015 by Donna Gall and based on "Playing it Forward".

Following the end of her competitive career, Lay came out as lesbian, and was a coordinator of the Pride House at the 2010 Winter Olympics. She is the partner of Penny Ballem, a civil servant who was the city manager of Vancouver.

== See also ==
- List of Olympic medalists in swimming (women)
- List of LGBT Olympians
