= Mariya Nikolova =

Bulgarian swimmer

Personal information
- Born: 9 April 1951 (age 75) Varna, Bulgaria

Sport
- Sport: Swimming

Mariya Nikolova (Bulgarian: Мария Николова, born 9 April 1951) is a Bulgarian former swimmer. She competed in three events at the 1968 Summer Olympics.
