= Nelly Syro =

Colombian swimmer

Personal information
- Born: 1 March 1953 (age 73) Cali, Colombia

Sport
- Sport: Swimming

Nelly Syro (born 1 March 1953) is a Colombian former swimmer. She competed in two events at the 1968 Summer Olympics.
