= Consuelo Changanaqui =

Peruvian swimmer

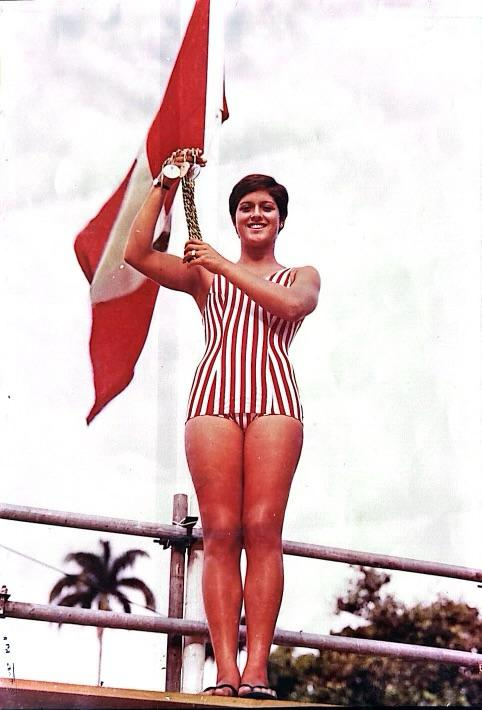

Personal information
- Nickname: Concho
- Born: 7 September 1951 (age 74)

Sport
- Sport: Swimming
- Strokes: Butterly, Freestyle, Medley
- Club: Club de Regatas Lima

Consuelo Changanaqui "Concho" (born 7 September 1951) is a celebrated Peruvian former competitive swimmer. At just 16 years, she competed in four events at the 1968 Summer Olympics in Mexico City.

Recognized as the most accomplished swimmer in Peruvian history, Concho once held all national records across all disciplines and distances. Concho excelled in multiple South American Championships, where she broke records in 200-meter freestyle, 400-meter freestyle, 200-meter medley and 400-meter medley.

Following a significant break from competitive swimming, Concho made a remarkable comeback at the 2008 World Masters Championship in Perth, Australia. At the age of 57, she demonstrated her enduring talent and passion for the sport by winning gold medals in both 800-meter freestyle and 400-meter medley.
