= Heli Matzdorf =

German swimmer

Personal information
- Born: 16 October 1951 (age 74) Bochum, Germany

Sport
- Sport: Swimming

Heli Matzdorf (born 16 October 1951) is a German former swimmer. She competed in two events at the 1968 Summer Olympics.
