= Nina Leonidovna Petrova =

Russian swimmer (born 1955)

Personal information
- Born: 28 November 1955 (age 69); Moscow, Russian SFSR, Soviet Union
- Height: 1.70 m (5 ft 7 in)
- Weight: 62 kg (137 lb)

Sport
- Sport: Swimming
- Club: Dynamo Moscow

Nina Leonidovna Petrova (Russian: Нина Леонидовна Петрова; born 28 November 1955) is a retired Russian swimmer. In 1972, she set a European record in the 200 m medley and finished eights in the 400 m medley at the 1972 Summer Olympics. Between 1970 and 1972 she set five national records in these disciplines.

She is married to Vladimir Baranov; they both work as swimming coaches for children.

== Publications ==
- Нина Леонидовна Петрова and Владимир А. Баранов (2006). Обучение детей плаванию в раннем возрасте. Сов. спорт. ISBN 5-9718-0119-8.
- Нина Леонидовна Петрова and Владимир А. Баранов (2008). Плавание. Техника обучения детей с раннего возраста. ФАИР. ISBN 978-5-8183-1474-7.
