= Carla Galle =

Belgian swimmer (1948–2022)

Personal information
- Born: 10 May 1948 Aalst, Belgium
- Died: 20 January 2022 (aged 73)

Sport
- Sport: Swimming
Medal record
Representing Belgium
Summer Universiade
Bronze medal – third place	1967 Tokyo	200m individual medley

Carla Galle (10 May 1948 – 20 January 2022) was a Belgian medley swimmer. She competed in two events at the 1968 Summer Olympics. Galle died on 20 January 2022, at the age of 73.
