= Larisa Zakharova =

Russian swimmer

Personal information
- Born: 31 October 1950 (age 75) Perm, Soviet Union

Sport
- Sport: Swimming

Larisa Zakharova (born 31 October 1950) is a Russian former medley swimmer. She competed in three events at the 1968 Summer Olympics for the Soviet Union.
