= Pru Chapman =

New Zealand swimmer

Personal information
- Born: 14 March 1950 Wellington, New Zealand
- Died: 24 April 2000 (aged 50)

Sport
- Sport: Swimming

Pru Chapman (14 March 1950 – 24 April 2000) was a New Zealand swimmer. She competed in three events at the 1968 Summer Olympics.
