= Marianne Seydel =

East German swimmer

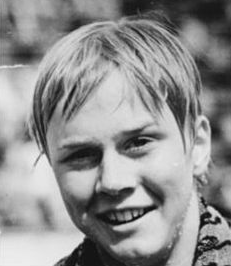

Personal information
- Born: 1 April 1950 (age 76) Greiz, East Germany
- Height: 1.74 m (5 ft 9 in)
- Weight: 60 kg (130 lb)

Sport
- Sport: Swimming
- Club: SC Karl-Marx-Stadt

Marianne Seydel (born 1 April 1950) is a retired East German swimmer. She competed in the 200 m and 400 m individual medley at the 1968 Summer Olympics and finished sixth in both events.
