= Eva Sigg =

Finnish swimmer

Personal information
- Born: 17 October 1950 (age 75) Helsinki, Finland

Sport
- Sport: Swimming

Eva Sigg (born 17 October 1950) is a Finnish former butterfly, freestyle and medley swimmer. She competed at the 1968 Summer Olympics and the 1972 Summer Olympics.
