= Maria Isabel Guerra =

Brazilian swimmer

Personal information
- Born: 8 July 1955 (age 71)

Sport
- Sport: Swimming

Maria Isabel Guerra (born 8 July 1955) is a Brazilian former butterfly and medley swimmer. She competed in three events at the 1972 Summer Olympics.
