= Hennie Penterman =

Dutch swimmer (born 1951)

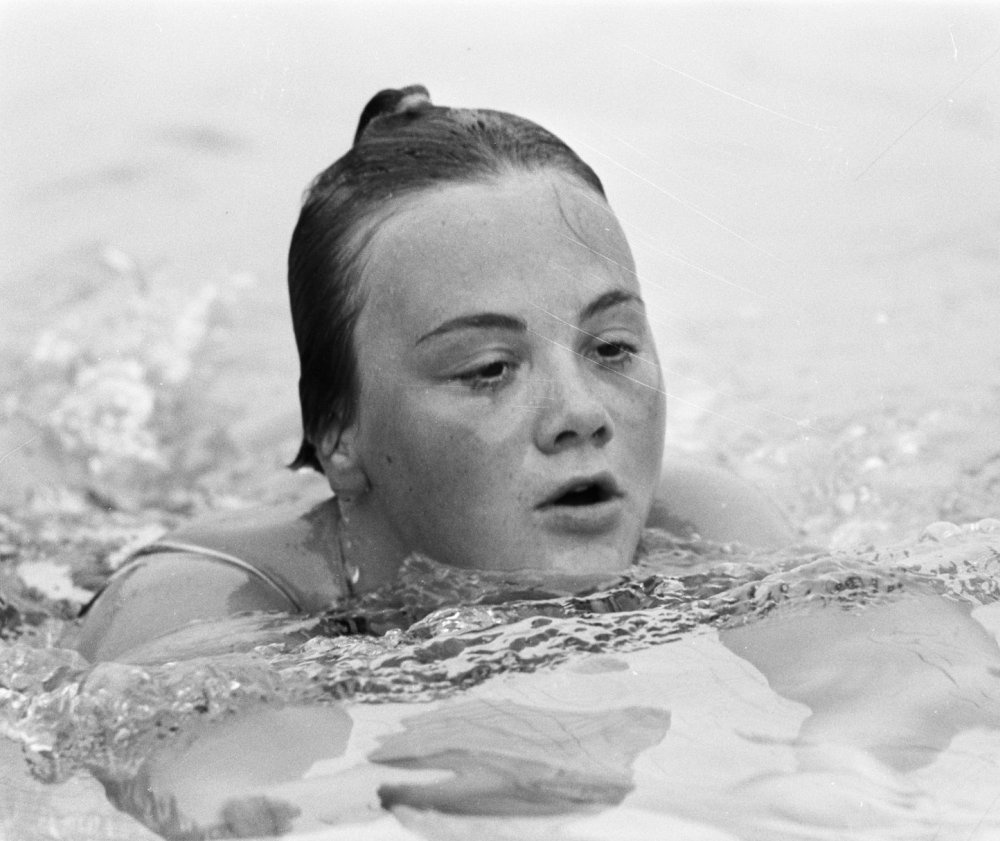
- Hennie Penterman in 1968

Personal information
- Born: 29 September 1951 (age 74) Amsterdam, the Netherlands
- Height: 1.69 m (5 ft 7 in)
- Weight: 59 kg (130 lb)

Sport
- Sport: Swimming
- Club: HDZ, Amsterdam

Hendrika ("Hennie") Penterman (born 29 September 1951) is a former medley swimmer from the Netherlands, who competed for her native country at two consecutive Summer Olympics, starting in 1968 in Mexico City, Mexico. There she was eliminated in the qualifying heats of the 200 m and 400 m individual medley. Four years later in Munich, West Germany, the same happened for Penterman in both her events.
