= Laura Vaca =

Mexican swimmer (born 1953)

Personal information
- Born: 3 February 1953 (age 73) Mexico City, Mexico

Sport
- Sport: Swimming
Medal record
Representing Mexico
Central American and Caribbean Games
Gold medal – first place	1970 Panama City	200m individual medley
Gold medal – first place	1970 Panama City	400m individual medley
Gold medal – first place	1970 Panama City	4x100m freestyle relay

Laura Vaca (born 3 February 1953) is a Mexican former freestyle and medley swimmer. She competed at the 1968 Summer Olympics and the 1972 Summer Olympics.
