= Swimming at the 1972 Summer Olympics – Women's 100 metre freestyle =

Women's 100 metre freestyle at the Games of the XX Olympiad
- Venue: Olympia Schwimmhalle
- Dates: 28 August 1972 (heats & semifinals); 29 August 1972 (finals)
- Competitors: 46 from 23 nations
- Winning time: 58.59 OR

Medalists
| 1st place, gold medalist(s) | | Sandy Neilson; United States |
| 2nd place, silver medalist(s) | | Shirley Babashoff; United States |
| 3rd place, bronze medalist(s) | | Shane Gould; Australia |

The women's 100 metre freestyle event at the 1972 Olympic Games took place between August 28 and 29. This swimming event used freestyle swimming, which means that the method of the stroke is not regulated (unlike backstroke, breaststroke, and butterfly events). Nearly all swimmers use the front crawl or a variant of that stroke. Because an Olympic size swimming pool is 50 metres long, this race consisted of two lengths of the pool.

== Results ==
=== Heats ===
Heat 1

| Rank | Athlete | Country | Time | Notes |
|---|---|---|---|---|
| 1 | Gabriele Wetzko | East Germany | 1:00.40 | Q |
| 2 | Tatyana Zolotnitskaya | Soviet Union | 1:01.24 | Q |
| 3 | Claude Mandonnaud | France | 1:01.34 | Q |
| 4 | Guylaine Berger | France | 1:01.54 | |
| 5 | Judit Turóczy | Hungary | 1:01.57 | |
| 6 | Sharon Booth | Australia | 1:02.07 | |
| 7 | Kirsten Strange-Campbell | Denmark | 1:03.83 | |
| 8 | Susana Saxlund | Uruguay | 1:04.91 | |

Heat 2

| Rank | Athlete | Country | Time | Notes |
|---|---|---|---|---|
| 1 | Enith Brigitha | Netherlands | 1:00.02 | Q |
| 2 | Anke Rijnders | Netherlands | 1:00.76 | Q |
| 3 | Judy Wright | Canada | 1:01.97 | |
| 4 | Chantal Schertz | France | 1:02.82 | |
| 5 | Edit Kovács | Hungary | 1:03.00 | |
| 6 | Lucy Burle | Brazil | 1:03.12 | |
| 7 | Marcia Arriaga | Mexico | 1:03.66 | |
| 8 | Ileana Morales | Venezuela | 1:04.13 | |

Heat 3

| Rank | Athlete | Country | Time | Notes |
|---|---|---|---|---|
| 1 | Magdolna Patóh | Hungary | 59.47 | Q, OR |
| 2 | Sandy Neilson | United States | 59.51 | Q |
| 3 | Hansje Bunschoten | Netherlands | 1:00.82 | Q |
| 4 | Eva Andersson | Sweden | 1:01.88 | |
| 5 | Susan Edmondson | Great Britain | 1:02.29 | |
| 6 | Françoise Monod | Switzerland | 1:02.43 | |
| 7 | Heather Coombridge | New Zealand | 1:02.95 | |
| 8 | Hsu Yue-yun | Chinese Taipei | 1:04.77 | |

Heat 4

| Rank | Athlete | Country | Time | Notes |
|---|---|---|---|---|
| 1 | Shirley Babashoff | United States | 59.51 | Q |
| 2 | Wendy Cook | Canada | 1:01.20 | Q |
| 3 | Mary Beth Rondeau | Canada | 1:01.46 | |
| 4 | Leanne Francis | Australia | 1:01.90 | |
| 5 | Lesley Allardice | Great Britain | 1:02.07 | |
| 6 | Inger Andersson | Sweden | 1:03.40 | |
| 7 | Diane Walker | Great Britain | 1:04.44 | |

Heat 5

| Rank | Athlete | Country | Time | Notes |
|---|---|---|---|---|
| 1 | Jutta Weber | West Germany | 59.72 | Q |
| 2 | Jenny Kemp | United States | 1:00.42 | Q |
| 3 | Sylvia Eichner | East Germany | 1:00.64 | Q |
| 4 | Angela Steinbach | West Germany | 1:01.66 | |
| 5 | Nadezhda Matyukhina | Soviet Union | 1:02.14 | |
| 6 | Margrit Thomet | Switzerland | 1:02.33 | |
| 7 | Laura Podestà | Italy | 1:02.88 | |

Heat 6

| Rank | Athlete | Country | Time | Notes |
|---|---|---|---|---|
| 1 | Shane Gould | Australia | 59.44 | Q, OR |
| 2 | Andrea Eife | East Germany | 59.73 | Q |
| 3 | Heidi Reineck | West Germany | 1:00.39 | Q |
| 4 | Grethe Mathiesen | Norway | 1:01.47 | |
| 5 | Yelena Timoshenko | Soviet Union | 1:01.68 | |
| 6 | Shigeko Kawanishi | Japan | 1:02.13 | |
| 7 | Khriska Peycheva | Bulgaria | 1:03.43 | |
| 8 | Virginia Anchestegui | Mexico | 1:04.99 | |

=== Semifinals ===
Heat 1

| Rank | Athlete | Country | Time | Notes |
|---|---|---|---|---|
| 1 | Shirley Babashoff | United States | 59.05 | Q, OR |
| 2 | Magdolna Patóh | Hungary | 59.64 | Q |
| 3 | Heidi Reineck | West Germany | 59.66 | Q |
| 4 | Andrea Eife | East Germany | 59.71 | Q |
| 5 | Jenny Kemp | United States | 59.93 | |
| 6 | Anke Rijnders | Netherlands | 1:00.84 | |
| 7 | Wendy Cook | Canada | 1:01.26 | |
| 8 | Claude Mandonnaud | France | 1:01.88 | |

Heat 2

| Rank | Athlete | Country | Time | Notes |
|---|---|---|---|---|
| 1 | Shane Gould | Australia | 59.20 | Q |
| 2 | Sandy Neilson | United States | 59.41 | Q |
| 3 | Gabriele Wetzko | East Germany | 59.46 | Q |
| 4 | Enith Brigitha | Netherlands | 59:75 | Q |
| 5 | Jutta Weber | West Germany | 59:90 | |
| 6 | Sylvia Eichner | East Germany | 1:00.73 | |
| 7 | Hansje Bunschoten | Netherlands | 1:00.79 | |
| 8 | Tatyana Zolotnitskaya | Soviet Union | 1:01.12 | |

=== Final ===
| Rank | Athlete | Country | Time | Notes |
|---|---|---|---|---|
| 1 | Sandy Neilson | United States | 58.59 | OR |
| 2 | Shirley Babashoff | United States | 59.02 | |
| 3 | Shane Gould | Australia | 59.06 | |
| 4 | Gabriele Wetzko | East Germany | 59.21 | |
| 5 | Heidi Reineck | West Germany | 59.73 | |
| 6 | Andrea Eife | East Germany | 59.91 | |
| 7 | Magdolna Patóh | Hungary | 1:00.02 | |
| 8 | Enith Brigitha | Netherlands | 1:00.09 | |

Key: OR = Olympic record
