= Swimming at the 1972 Summer Olympics – Women's 4 × 100 metre freestyle relay =

Women's 4 × 100 metre freestyle relay at the Games of the XX Olympiad
- Venue: Olympia Schwimmhalle
- Date: 30 August 1972 (heats & final)
- Competitors: 69 from 16 nations
- Teams: 16
- Winning time: 3:55.19 WR

Medalists
1st place, gold medalist(s)		Sandra Neilson, Jennifer Kemp, Jane Barkman, Shirley Babashoff, Kim Peyton*, Lynn Skrifvars*, Ann Marshall*	United States
2nd place, silver medalist(s)		Gabriele Wetzko, Andrea Eife, Elke Sehmisch, Kornelia Ender, Sylvia Eichner*	East Germany
3rd place, bronze medalist(s)		Jutta Weber, Heidi Reineck, Gudrun Beckmann, Angela Steinbach; *Indicates the swimmer only competed in the preliminary heats.	West Germany

The women's 4 × 100 metre freestyle relay event at the 1972 Olympic Games took place on August 30. The relay featured teams of four swimmers each swimming two lengths of the 50 m pool freestyle.

== Results ==
=== Heats ===
Heat 1

Place	Swimmers	Time	Notes
1	Andrea Eife, Elke Sehmisch, Kornelia Ender, Sylvia Eichner (GDR)	3:58.11	
2	Enith Brigitha, Anke Rijnders, Hansje Bunschoten, Josien Elzerman (NED)	4:02.70	
3	Deborah Palmer, Leanne Francis, Sharon Booth, Debra Cain (AUS)	4:05.44	
4	Wendy Cook-Hogg, Judy Wright, Mary Beth Rondeau, Leslie Cliff (CAN)	4:05.95	
5	Tatyana Zolotnitskaya, Yelena Timoshenko, Nadezhda Matyukhina, Iryna Ustymenko (URS)	4:07.55	
6	Claude Mandonnaud, Chantal Schertz, Christine Petit, Guylaine Berger (FRA)	4:08.82	
7	María Teresa Ramírez, Virginia Anchestegui, Laura Vaca, Marcia Arriaga (MEX)	4:14.95	
8	Ann O'Connor, Christine Fulcher, Brenda McGrory, Aisling O'Leary (IRL)	4:26.34	

Heat 2

Place	Swimmers	Time	Notes
1	Shirley Babashoff, Kim Peyton, Lynn Skrifvars, Ann Marshall (USA)	3:58.93	
2	Jutta Weber, Heidi Reineck, Gudrun Beckmann, Angela Steinbach (FRG)	4:01.63	
3	Anita Zarnowiecki, Eva Andersson, Diana Olsson, Irwi Johansson (SWE)	4:03.99	
4	Andrea Gyarmati, Judit Turóczy, Edit Kovács, Magdolna Patóh (HUN)	4:04.29	
5	Yoshimi Nishigawa, Shigeko Kawanishi, Eiko Goshi, Yukari Takemoto (JPN)	4:08.34	NR
6	Diana Sutherland, Judith Sirs, Susan Edmondson, Lesley Allardice (GBR)	4:09.51	
7	Laura Podestà, Patrizia Lanfredini, Laura Gorgerino, Federica Stabilini (ITA)	4:10.70	
8	Margrit Thomet, Irène Debrunner, Christiane Flamand, Françoise Monod (SUI)	4:10.73	

=== Final ===
Rank	Nation	Swimmers	Time	Notes
1st place, gold medalist(s)	United States	Sandra Neilson (58.98); Jennifer Kemp (58.99); Jane Barkman (59.03); Shirley Babashoff (58.18)	3:55.19	WR
2nd place, silver medalist(s)	East Germany	Gabriele Wetzko (59.23); Andrea Eife (58.96); Elke Sehmisch (59.08); Kornelia Ender (58.27)	3:55.55	ER
3rd place, bronze medalist(s)	West Germany	Jutta Weber (59.84); Heidi Reineck (59.02); Gudrun Beckmann (59.99); Angela Steinbach (59.07)	3:57.93	NR
4	Hungary	Andrea Gyarmati (59.32); Judit Turóczy (1:00.88); Edit Kovács (1:01.12); Magdolna Patóh (59.06)	4:00.39	
5	Netherlands	Enith Brigitha (59.46); Anke Rijnders (1:00.85); Hansje Bunschoten (59.93); Josien Elzerman (1:01.24)	4:01.49	
6	Sweden	Anita Zarnowiecki (1:01.16); Eva Andersson (1:00.25); Diana Olsson (1:00.30); Irwi Johansson (1:00.97)	4:02.69	
7	Canada	Wendy Cook (1:00.98); Judy Wright (1:01.06); Mary Beth Rondeau (1:01.37); Leslie Cliff (1:00.41)	4:03.83	
8	Australia	Deborah Palmer (1:02.02); Leanne Francis (1:01.09); Sharon Booth (1:00.70); Shane Gould (1:01.00)	4:04.82	
