= Swimming at the 1973 World Aquatics Championships – Women's 4 × 100 metre freestyle relay =

Women's 4 × 100 metre freestyle relay at the 1973 World Aquatics Championships
- Dates: September 8, 1973
- Winning time: 3:52.45 WR

Medalists
gold medal	Kornelia Ender; Andrea Eife; Andrea Hübner; Sylvia Eichner	East Germany
silver medal	Kim Peyton; Kathy Heddy; Heather Greenwood; Shirley Babashoff	United States
bronze medal	Jutta Weber; Heidemarie Reineck; Gudrun Beckmann; Angela Steinbach	West Germany

The women's 4 × 100 metre freestyle relay competition of the swimming events at the 1973 World Aquatics Championships took place on September 8.

== Records ==
Prior to the competition, the existing world and championship records were as follows.

World record	United States (USA); Sandy Neilson; Jenny Kemp; Jane Barkman; Shirley Babashoff	3:55.19	Munich, West Germany	30 August 1972
Competition record	N/A	N/A	N/A	N/A

The following records were established during the competition:

Date	Event	Nation	Athletes	Time	Record
8 September	Heat	East Germany	Andrea Hübner; Eike Schmisch; Angela Franke; Sylvia Eichner	3:56.550	CR
8 September	Final	East Germany	Kornelia Ender; Andrea Eife; Andrea Hübner; Sylvia Eichner	3:52.45	WR

== Results ==
=== Heats ===
15 teams participated in 2 heats.

Rank	Heat	Lane	Nation	Athletes	Time	Notes
1	1	-	East Germany	Andrea Hübner; Eike Schmisch; Angela Franke; Sylvia Eichner	3:56.55	Q, CR
2	1	-	United States	Keena Rothhammer; Deena Deardurff; Heather Greenwood; Kim Peyton	3:57.56	Q
3	2	-	Canada		4:01.44	Q
4	1	-	Sweden	Anita Zarnowiecki; Irwi Johansson; Diana Olsson; Gunilla Lundberg	4:02.23	Q
5	2	-	West Germany		4:02.61	Q
6	2	-	Netherlands		4:02.94	Q
7	2	-	France		4:06.47	Q
8	1	-	Italy	Laura Podesta; Laura Gorgerino; Patrizia Lanfredini; Novella Calligaris	4:07.43	Q
9	2	-	Switzerland		4:07.66	
10	2	-	Soviet Union		4:08.10	
11	1	-	Australia	Debra Cain; Suzy Anderson; Virginia Rickard; Narelle Moras	4:08.71	
12	1	-	Hungary	Andrea Gyarmati; Edit Kovács; Ildikó Szekeres; Magdolna Patóh	4:09.02	
13	2	-	Brazil		4:13.91	
14	1	-	Venezuela	Ileana Morales; Gisela Cerezo; Marianela Huen; S. Arambatsis	4:26.03	
15	1	-	Puerto Rico	Leslie Thompson; D. McSwain; L. Moreda; María Mock	4:26.80	

=== Final ===
The results of the final are below.

Rank	Lane	Nation	Athletes	Time	Notes
1st place, gold medalist(s)	-	East Germany	Kornelia Ender; Andrea Eife; Andrea Hübner; Sylvia Eichner	3:52.45	WR
2nd place, silver medalist(s)	-	United States	Kim Peyton; Kathy Heddy; Heather Greenwood; Shirley Babashoff	3:55.52	
3rd place, bronze medalist(s)	-	West Germany	Jutta Weber; Heidemarie Reineck; Gudrun Beckmann; Angela Steinbach	3:58.88	
4	-	Canada	Gail Amundrud; Judy Wright; Wendy Cook; Leslie Cliff	4:00.20	
5	-	Sweden	Gunilla Lundberg; L. Isaksson; Irwi Johansson; Diana Olsson	4:02.01	
6	-	Netherlands	Enith Brigitha; A. Segaar; Linda Faber; Veronica Stel	4:02.16	
7	-	Italy	Laura Podesta; Laura Gorgerino; Patrizia Lanfredini; Federica Stabilini	4:06.59	
8	-	France	Guylaine Berger; Chantal Schertz; Jacquéline Pele; Marie-Christine Knibiehly	4:08.25	
