= Swimming at the 1973 World Aquatics Championships – Women's 200 metre freestyle =

Women's 200 metre freestyle at the 1973 World Aquatics Championships
- Dates: September 5, 1973
- Competitors: 34 from 23 nations
- Winning time: 2:04.999

Medalists
gold medal	Keena Rothhammer	United States
silver medal	Shirley Babashoff	United States
bronze medal	Andrea Eife	East Germany

Women's 200 metre freestyle competition of the swimming events at the 1973 World Aquatics Championships took place on September 5.

Records show that prior to the competition, the existing world and championship records were as follows.

World record	Shane Gould (AUS)	2:03.56	Munich, West Germany	1 September 1972
Competition record	N/A	N/A	N/A	N/A

The following records were established during the competition:

Date	Event	Name	Nationality	Time	Record
5 September	Heat	Lesley Allardice	United Kingdom	2:12.946	CR
5 September	Heat	Irwi Johansson	Sweden	2:09.260	CR
5 September	Heat	Andrea Eife	East Germany	2:08.099	CR
5 September	Heat	Keena Rothhammer	United States	2:07.531	CR
5 September	Final	Keena Rothhammer	United States	2:04.999	CR

== Results ==
=== Heats ===
34 swimmers participated in 5 heats, qualified swimmers are listed:

Rank	Heat	Lane	Name	Nationality	Time	Notes
1	4	-	Keena Rothhammer	United States	2:07.531	Q, CR
2	5	-	Shirley Babashoff	United States	2:07.753	Q
3	3	-	Andrea Eife	East Germany	2:08.099	Q, CR
4	2	-	Irwi Johansson	Sweden	2:09.260	Q, CR
5	5	-	Virginia Rickard	Australia	2:09.936	Q, PB
6	2	-	Elke Sehmisch	East Germany	2:09.973	Q
7	5	-	Jutta Weber	West Germany	2:10.778	Q
8	2	-	Veronica Stel	Netherlands	2:10.878	Q
9	4	-	Suzy Anderson	Australia	2:11.179	
10	5	-	Guylaine Berger	France	2:11.400	
11	3	-	Leslie Cliff	Canada	2:11.506	
12	3	-	Angela Steinbach	West Germany	2:12.438	
13	1	-	Lesley Allardice	Great Britain	2:12.946	CR
14	5	-	Tatyana Zolotnitskaya	Soviet Union	2:13.141	
15	4	-	Maria Guimarães	Brazil	2:14.218	
16	1	-	Brenda Holmes	Canada	2:14.431	
17	4	-	Federica Stabilini	Italy	2:14.496	
18	5	-	Lucy Burle	Brazil	2:14.987	
19	1	-	Marie Sundeborg	Sweden	2:15.506	
20	1	-	Ileana Morales	Venezuela	2:15.518	
21	4	-	Tamara Shelofastova	Soviet Union	2:15.940	
22	3	-	Chantal Schertz	France	2:16.558	
23	1	-	Cathy Whiting	New Zealand	2:17.016	
24	3	-	Elżbieta Pilawska	Poland	2:17.716	
25	2	-	Eleni Avlanitou	Greece	2:19.384	
26	4	-	María Saavedra	Colombia	2:20.064	
27	4	-	Marianela Huen	Venezuela	2:21.916	
28	1	-	Loida Moreda	Puerto Rico	2:23.097	
29	5	-	Leslie Thompson	Puerto Rico	2:23.220	
30	2	-	Eva Tomandl	Austria	2:24.075	
31	4	-	B. Garcia	Argentina	2:24.328	
32	3	-	Myriam Mizouni	Tunisia	2:25.432	
33	3	-	Edit Kovács	Hungary	2:25.470	
34	2	-	H. Nastaren	Iran	2:45.589	

=== Final ===
The results of the final are below.

Rank	Lane	Name	Nationality	Time	Notes
1st place, gold medalist(s)	-	Keena Rothhammer	United States	2:04.999	CR
2nd place, silver medalist(s)	-	Shirley Babashoff	United States	2:05.332	
3rd place, bronze medalist(s)	-	Andrea Eife	East Germany	2:05.525	
4	-	Virginia Rickard	Australia	2:07.889	PB
5	-	Irwi Johansson	Sweden	2:08.895	
6	-	Elke Sehmisch	East Germany	2:09.331	
7	-	Veronica Stel	Netherlands	2:09.412	
8	-	Jutta Weber	West Germany	2:10.587	
