= 4 × 100 metres freestyle relay =

The 4 × 100 metres freestyle relay is an event in competitive swimming. World records are ratified by World Aquatics (formerly FINA). The current long course world record holders are the US (men and mixed) and Australia (women), while the men's and women's short course world records (men and women) are currently held by the US.

The men's event has been contested at the Olympic Games since 1964; it was removed 1976 program and was reinstated in 1984. The women's event has been contested since the 1912 games. The current Olympic champions are the US (men) and Australia (women). The men's and women's events have been contested at the World Aquatics Championships since the inaugural championships in 1973, while the mixed event was introduced in 2015 and removed from the 2027 program; the current world champions (long course) are Australia (men and women) and the US (mixed). The men's and women's events have been contested at the World Aquatics Swimming Championships (25m) since the inaugural championships in 1993; the US are the current world champions (short course) in both events.

The men's 4×100-metre freestyle is often considered "swimming’s indisputably best event at the Olympics", as "It is also the Alpha Dog moment in water. Our Country is faster than Your Country". Nathan Adrian was quoted as saying “Every American swimmer dreams of getting up there in the 4x100 free relay and winning a gold medal.” The Australians won the event at the 2000 Summer Olympics which they hosted and celebrated by playing air guitar, while the Australian relay team was dubbed "Weapons of Mass Destruction" after winning in the 2011 World Aquatics Championships. At the 2008 Summer Olympics, Frenchman Alain Bernard famously said he would "smash the Americans"; while the French team did beat the previous world record, they did it 0:00.08 after Jason Lezak had already edged out Bernard in the anchor leg, giving the Americans the gold and a new world record, which is still standing today.

== World record progression ==
=== Men long course ===
#	Time		Name	Nationality	Date	Meet	Location	Ref
1	4:10.2		Zoltán Kiss; Gyula Dienes; Árpád Lengyel; Ferenc Csik	Hungary	June 26, 1937	-	Budapest, Hungary	
2	4:06.6		Gyula Zolyomi; Istvan Korosi; Ödön Grófe; Ferenc Csik	Hungary	August 15, 1937	-	Budapest, Hungary	
3	4:03.6		Hermann Heibel; Hans Freese; Edward Askamp; Helmuth Fischer	Germany	March 5, 1938	-	Bremen, Germany	
4	4:02.4		Otto Wille; Werner Birr; Werner Plath; Kurt von Eckenbrecher	Germany	April 1, 1938	-	Copenhagen, Denmark	
5	4:02.0		Gyula Zolyomi; Ferenc Csik; Istvan Korosi; Ödön Gróf	Hungary	July 14, 1938	-	Budapest, Hungary	
6	3:59.2		Takashi Hirose; Otto Jaretz; Paul Wolf; Peter Fick	United States	August 20, 1938	-	Berlin, Germany	
7	3:54.4		Willis Sanburn; Edward Pope; Russell Duncan; Howard Johnson	United States	March 8, 1940	-	New Haven, United States	
8	3:50.8		Howard Johnson; Richard Kelly; Edward Pope; Frank Lilley	United States	March 18, 1942	-	New Haven, United States	
9	3:48.6		Alan Ford; Edward Hueber; Frank Dooley; Howard Johnson	United States	June 29, 1948	-	New Haven, United States	
10	3:47.9		Dick Thoman; Don Sheff; William Farnsworth; Ray Reid	United States	March 19, 1951	-	New Haven, United States	
11	3:46.8		Hiroshi Suzuki; Atsushi Tani; Toru Goto; Manabu Koga	Japan	August 6, 1955	-	Tokyo, Japan	
12	3:46.3		Gary Chapman; John Konrads; Geoff Shipton; John Devitt	Australia	May 3, 1958	-	Brisbane, Australia	
13	3:44.4		Elton Follett; Lance Larson; Jeff Farrell; Joe Alkire	United States	July 21, 1959	-	Tokyo, Japan	
14	3:42.5		Alain Gottvallès; Gerard Gropaiz; Jean-Pierre Curtillet; Robert Christophe	France	August 10, 1962	-	Thionville, France	
15	3:39.9		Steve Clark; N. Schoenman; Don Schollander; Ed Townsend	United States	July 4, 1963	-	Los Altos, United States	
16	3:36.1		Steve Clark; Richard McDonough; Gary Ilman; Ed Townsend	United States	August 18, 1963	-	Tokyo, Japan	
17	3:33.2		Steve Clark (52.9 =WR); Mike Austin; Gary Ilman; Don Schollander	United States	October 14, 1964	-	Tokyo, Japan	
18	3:32.6		Ken Walsh; Zac Zorn; Don Havens; Greg Charlton	United States	August 28, 1967	-	Tokyo, Japan	
19	3:32.5		Zac Zorn (53.0); Stephen Rerych (53.0); Ken Walsh (53.4); Don Schollander (53.1)	United States	September 3, 1968	U.S. Olympic Trials	Long Beach, United States	
20	3:31.7		Zac Zorn (53.4); Stephen Rerych (52.8); Mark Spitz (52.7); Ken Walsh (52.8)	United States	October 17, 1968	Olympic Games	Mexico City, Mexico	
21	3:28.8		Don Havens; Mike Weston; Bill Frawley; Frank Heckl	United States	August 23, 1970	AAU Nationals	Los Angeles, United States	
22	3:28.84	h	Dave Fairbank (52.61); Gary Conelly (51.69); Jerry Heidenreich (51.89); David Edgar (52.63)	United States	August 28, 1972	Olympic Games	Munich, West Germany	
23	3:26.42		David Edgar (52.69); John Murphy (52.04); Jerry Heidenreich (50.78); Mark Spitz (50.90)	United States	August 28, 1972	Olympic Games	Munich, West Germany	
24	3:25.17		Joe Bottom; Andy Coan; Jim Montgomery; Tom Hickcox (50.8)	United States	September 1, 1974	United States–East Germany dual meet	Concord, United States	
25	3:24.85		Bruce Furniss (51.82); Jim Montgomery (50.53); Andy Coan (50.61); John Murphy (51.89)	United States	July 25, 1975	World Championships	Cali, Colombia	
26	3:21.11		Jack Babashoff (50.31); Joe Bottom (50.45); Rick DeMont (50.40); Jim Montgomery (49.95)	United States	August 28, 1977	United States–East Germany dual meet	East Berlin, East Germany	
27	3:19.74		Jack Babashoff (51.30); Rowdy Gaines (49.52); Jim Montgomery (49.66); David McCagg (49.26)	United States	August 22, 1978	World Championships	West Berlin, West Germany	
28	3:19.26		Chris Cavanaugh (50.13); Robin Leamy (50.10); David McCagg (49.89); Rowdy Gaines (49.14)	United States	August 5, 1982	World Championships	Guayaquil, Ecuador	
29	3:19.03		Chris Cavanaugh (50.83); Mike Heath (49.60); Matt Biondi (49.67); Rowdy Gaines (48.93)	United States	August 2, 1984	Olympic Games	Los Angeles, United States	
30	3:17.08		Scott McCadam (50.08); Paul Wallace (49.51); Mike Heath (49.83); Matt Biondi (47.66)	United States	August 17, 1985	Pan Pacific Championships	Tokyo, Japan	
31	3:16.53		Chris Jacobs (49.63); Troy Dalbey (49.75); Tom Jager (49.34); Matt Biondi (47.81)	United States	September 23, 1988	Olympic Games	Seoul, South Korea	
32	3:15.11		David Fox (49.32); Joe Hudepohl (49.11); Jon Olsen (48.17); Gary Hall, Jr. (48.51)	United States	August 12, 1995	Pan Pacific Championships	Atlanta, United States	
33	3:13.67		Michael Klim (48.18 WR); Chris Fydler (48.48); Ashley Callus (48.71); Ian Thorpe (48.30)	Australia	September 16, 2000	Olympic Games	Sydney, Australia	
34	3:13.17		Roland Schoeman (48.17); Lyndon Ferns (48.13); Darian Townsend (48.96); Ryk Neethling (47.91)	South Africa	August 15, 2004	Olympic Games	Athens, Greece	
35	3:12.46		Michael Phelps (48.83); Neil Walker (47.89); Cullen Jones (47.96); Jason Lezak (47.78)	United States	August 19, 2006	Pan Pacific Championships	Victoria, Canada	
36	3:12.23	h	Nathan Adrian (48.82); Cullen Jones (47.61); Ben Wildman-Tobriner (48.03); Matt Grevers (47.77)	United States	August 10, 2008	Olympic Games	Beijing, China	
37	3:08.24		Michael Phelps (47.51); Garrett Weber-Gale (47.02); Cullen Jones (47.65); Jason Lezak (46.06)	United States	August 11, 2008	Olympic Games	Beijing, China	

Legend: # – Record awaiting ratification by FINA; yd – set in a pool measured in yards;
Records not set in finals: h – heat; sf – semifinal; r – relay 1st leg; rh – relay heat 1st leg; b – B final; † – en route to final mark; so – swim-off; tt – time trial

=== Men short course ===
Time	Nationality	Name	Date	Place
3:14.00	Sweden	Tommy Werner (48.33); Anders Holmertz (49.07); Michael Söderlund (49.10); Joakim Holmqvist (47.50)	March 19, 1989	Malmö, Sweden
3:13.97	Brazil	Gustavo Borges (48.19); Fernando Scherer (47.95); José Carlos Souza (49.37); Teófilo Ferreira (48.46)	July 7, 1993	Santos, Brazil
3:12.11	Brazil	Fernando Scherer (48.27); Teófilo Ferreira (48.28); José Carlos Souza (48.90); Gustavo Borges (46.66)	December 5, 1993	Palma de Mallorca, Spain
3:10.45	Brazil	Fernando Scherer (47.27); Carlos Jayme (48.49); Alexandre Massura (47.93); Gustavo Borges (46.76)	December 20, 1998	Rio de Janeiro, Brazil
3:09.57	Sweden	Johan Nyström (49.04); Lars Frölander (45.69); Mattias Ohlin (47.87); Stefan Nystrand (46.97)	March 16, 2000	Athens, Greece
3:08.44	United States	Ryan Lochte (47.09); Bryan Lundquist (46.64); Nathan Adrian (46.57); Doug Van Wie (48.14)	April 9, 2008	Manchester, United Kingdom
3:04.98	CN Marseille	Grégory Mallet (47.41); Fabien Gilot (44.92); William Meynard (47.65); Frédérick Bousquet (45.00)	December 20, 2008	Istres, France
3:03.30	United States	Nathan Adrian (45.08); Matt Grevers (44.68); Garrett Weber-Gale (47.43); Michael Phelps (46.11)	December 19, 2009	Manchester, United Kingdom
3:03.03	United States	Caeleb Dressel (45.66); Blake Pieroni (45.75); Michael Chadwick (45.86); Ryan Held (45.76)	December 11, 2018	Hangzhou, China
3:02.75	Italy	Alessandro Miressi (46.15); Paolo Conte Bonin (45.93); Leonardo Deplano (45.54); Thomas Ceccon (45.13)	December 13, 2022	Melbourne, Australia
3:01.66	United States	Jack Alexy (45.05); Luke Hobson (45.18); Kieran Smith (46.01); Chris Guiliano (45.42)	December 14, 2024	Budapest, Hungary

=== Women long course ===
Time	Nationality	Name	Date	Place
5:52.8	Great Britain	Belle Moore (?); Jennie Fletcher (?); Annie Speirs (?); Irene Steer (?)	July 15, 1912	Stockholm, Sweden
5:11.6	United States	Margaret Woodbridge (?); Frances Schroth (?); Irene Guest (?); Ethelda Bleibtrey (?)	August 29, 1920	Antwerp, Belgium
4:58.8	United States	Gertrude Ederle (?); Euphrasia Donnelly (?); Ethel Lackie (?); Mariechen Wehselau (?)	July 20, 1924	Paris, France
4:55.6	United States	Adelaide Lambert (?); Josephine McKim (?); Susan Laird (?); Albina Osipowich (?)	August 9, 1928	Amsterdam, Netherlands
4:47.6	United States	Adelaide Lambert (?); Eleanor Garatti (?); Albina Osipowich (?); Martha Norelius (?)	August 9, 1928	Amsterdam, Netherlands
4:38.0	United States	Josephine McKim (?); Helen Johns (?); Eleanor Garatti (?); Helene Madison (?)	August 12, 1932	Los Angeles, United States
4:33.3	Netherlands	Jopie Selbach (?); Annie Timmermans (?); Rie Mastenbroek (?); Willy den Ouden (?)	April 14, 1934	Rotterdam, Netherlands
4:32.8	Netherlands	Jopie Selbach (?); Rie Mastenbroek (?); Catherina Wagner (?); Willy den Ouden (?)	May 24, 1936	Rotterdam, Netherlands
4:29.7	Denmark	Elvi Svendsen (?); Gunvor Kraft (?); Birte Ove-Petersen (?); Ragnhild Hveger (?)	February 8, 1938	Copenhagen, Denmark
4:27.6	Denmark	Eva Arndt (?); Gunvor Kraft (?); Birte Ove-Petersen (?); Ragnhild Hveger (?)	August 7, 1938	Copenhagen, Denmark
4:27.2	Hungary	Mária Littomeritzky (?); Éva Novák (?); Éva Székely (?); Katalin Szőke (?)	April 27, 1952	Moscow, Soviet Union
4:24.4	Hungary	Ilona Novák (1:07.8); Judit Temes (1:05.8); Éva Novák (1:05.1); Katalin Szőke (1:05.7)	August 1, 1952	Helsinki, Finland
4:22.3	Australia	Lorraine Crapp (?); Dawn Fraser (?); Margaret Gibson (?); Barbara Jackson (?)	October 20, 1956	Sydney, Australia
4:19.7	Australia	Lorraine Crapp (?); Dawn Fraser (?); Faith Leech (?); Margaret Gibson (?)	October 25, 1956	Melbourne, Australia
4:17.1	Australia	Dawn Fraser (?); Faith Leech (?); Sandra Morgan (?); Lorraine Crapp (1:03.1)	December 6, 1956	Melbourne, Australia
4:16.2	Australia	Dawn Fraser (?); Alva Colquhoun (?); Ilsa Konrads (?); Lorraine Crapp (?)	August 6, 1960	Townsville, Australia
4:08.9	United States	Joan Spillane (?); Shirley Stobs (?); Carolyn Wood (?); Chris von Saltza (?)	September 3, 1960	Rome, Italy
4:08.5	(United States) Santa Clara Swim Club	Terri Stickles (?); Donna de Varona (?); Pokey Watson (?); Judy Haroun (?)	July 31, 1964	Los Altos, United States
4:07.6	United States	Lynne Allsup (?); Terri Stickles (?); Kathy Seidel (?); Eleanor Bricker (?)	September 28, 1964	Los Angeles, United States
4:03.8	United States	Sharon Stouder (?); Donna de Varona (?); Pokey Watson (?); Kathy Ellis (?)	October 15, 1964	Tokyo, Japan
4:03.5	(United States) Santa Clara Swim Club	Linda Gustavson (?); Nancy Ryan (?); Laura Fritz (?); Pokey Watson (?)	August 19, 1967	Philadelphia, United States
4:01.1	(United States) Santa Clara Swim Club	Linda Gustavson (?); Pokey Watson (?); Pam Carpinelli (?); Jan Henne (?)	July 6, 1968	Santa Clara, United States
4:00.8	East Germany	Gabriele Wetzko; Iris Komar; Elke Sehmisch; Sabine Schulze	September 11, 1970	Barcelona, Spain
4:00.7	United States	Shirley Babashoff (?); Kim Peyton (?); Linda Johnson (?); Deena Deardurff (?)	September 9, 1971	Minsk, Soviet Union
3:58.11	United States	Kim Peyton (?); Sandy Neilson (?); Jane Barkman (?); Shirley Babashoff (?)	August 18, 1972	Knoxville, United States
3:58.11	East Germany	Sylvia Eichner (?); Elke Sehmisch (?); Andrea Eife (?); Kornelia Ender (?)	August 30, 1972	Munich, West Germany
3:55.19	United States	Sandy Neilson (?); Jenny Kemp (?); Jane Barkman (?); Shirley Babashoff (?)	August 30, 1972	Munich, West Germany
3:52.45	East Germany	Andrea Eife (?); Andrea Hubner (?); Sylvia Eichner (?); Kornelia Ender (?)	September 8, 1973	Belgrade, Yugoslavia
3:51.99	United States	Ann Marshall (?); Kim Peyton (?); Kathy Heddy (?); Shirley Babashoff (?)	August 31, 1974	Concord, United States
3:49.37	East Germany	Kornelia Ender (56.22 WR); Barbara Krause (57.41); Claudia Hempel (57.97); Ute Bruckner (57.77)	July 26, 1975	Cali, Colombia
3:48.80	(East Germany) SC Dynamo Berlin	Rosemarie Kother (?); Andrea Pollack (?); Monika Seltmann (?); Barbara Krause (?)	June 2, 1976	East Berlin, East Germany
3:44.82	United States	Kim Peyton (56.95); Wendy Boglioli (55.81); Jill Sterkel (55.78); Shirley Babashoff (56.28)	July 25, 1976	Montreal, Canada
3:43.43	United States	Tracy Caulkins (56.57); Stephanie Elkins (55.92); Jill Sterkel (55.70); Cynthia Woodhead (55.24)	August 26, 1978	West Berlin
3:42.71	East Germany	Barbara Krause (54.90); Caren Metschuck (55.61); Ines Diers (55.90); Sarina Hülsenbeck (56.30)	July 27, 1980	Moscow, Soviet Union
3:42.41	East Germany	Birgit Meineke (?); Kristin Otto (?); Karen König (?); Heike Friedrich (?)	August 21, 1984	Moscow, Soviet Union
3:40.57	East Germany	Kristin Otto (54.73 WR); Manuela Stellmach (54.96); Sabina Schulze (55.52); Heike Friedrich (55.36)	August 19, 1986	Madrid, Spain
3:39.46	United States	Nicole Haislett (55.33); Dara Torres (55.33); Angel Martino (54.79); Jenny Thompson (54.01)	July 28, 1992	Barcelona, Spain
3:37.91	China	Le Jingyi (54.31); Shan Ying (54.38); Le Ying (55.09); Lü Bin (54.13)	September 7, 1994	Rome, Italy
3:36.61	United States	Amy Van Dyken (55.08); Dara Torres (53.51); Courtney Shealy (54.40); Jenny Thompson (53.62)	September 16, 2000	Sydney, Australia
3:36.00	Germany	Katrin Meissner (54.82); Petra Dallmann (53.95); Sandra Völker (53.59); Franziska van Almsick (53.64)	July 29, 2002	Berlin, Germany
3:35.94	Australia	Alice Mills (54.75); Libby Lenton (53.57); Petria Thomas (54.67); Jodie Henry (52.95)	August 14, 2004	Athens, Greece
3:35.22	Germany	Petra Dallmann (54.53); Daniela Götz (53.87); Britta Steffen (52.66); Annika Liebs (54.16)	July 31, 2006	Budapest, Hungary
3:33.62	Netherlands	Inge Dekker (53.77); Ranomi Kromowidjojo (53.61); Femke Heemskerk (53.62); Marleen Veldhuis (52.62)	March 18, 2008	Eindhoven, Netherlands
3:31.72	Netherlands	Inge Dekker (53.61); Ranomi Kromowidjojo (52.30); Femke Heemskerk (53.03); Marleen Veldhuis (52.78)	July 26, 2009	Rome, Italy
3:30.98	Australia	Bronte Campbell (53.15); Melanie Schlanger (52.76); Emma McKeon (52.91); Cate Campbell (52.16)	July 24, 2014	Glasgow, Scotland
3:30.65	Australia	Emma McKeon (53.41); Brittany Elmslie (53.12); Bronte Campbell (52.15); Cate Campbell (51.97)	August 6, 2016	Rio de Janeiro, Brazil
3:30.05	Australia	Shayna Jack (54.03); Bronte Campbell (52.03); Emma McKeon (52.99); Cate Campbell (51.00)	April 5, 2018	Gold Coast, Australia
3:29.69	Australia	Bronte Campbell (53.01); Meg Harris (53.09); Emma McKeon (51.35); Cate Campbell (52.24)	July 25, 2021	Tokyo, Japan
3:27.96	Australia	Mollie O'Callaghan (52.08); Shayna Jack (51.69); Meg Harris (52.29); Emma McKeon (51.90)	July 23, 2023	Fukuoka, Japan

=== Women short course ===
Time	Nationality	Name	Date	Place
3:35.97	China	Lü Bin (-); Shan Ying (-); Jia Yuanyuan (-); Le Jingyi (-)	December 4, 1993	Palma de Mallorca, Spain
3:34.55	China	Le Jingyi (53.32); Chao Na (54.33); Shan Ying (53.55); Nian Yin (52.55)	April 19, 1997	Gothenburg, Sweden
3:33.32	Netherlands	Inge Dekker (53.52); Hinkelien Schreuder (53.63); Chantal Groot (54.00); Marleen Veldhuis (52.17)	April 8, 2006	Shanghai, China
3:31.66	Australia	Libby Lenton (51.91); Melanie Schlanger (53.23); Shayne Reese (53.27); Alice Mills (53.25)	September 2, 2007	Melbourne, Australia
3:30.85	Netherlands	Hinkelien Schreuder (53.40); Femke Heemskerk (52.95); Ranomi Kromowidjojo (52.97); Marleen Veldhuis (51.53)	September 9, 2007	Eindhoven, Netherlands
3:29.42	Netherlands	Hinkelien Schreuder (53.62); Femke Heemskerk (52.61); Inge Dekker (51.76); Marleen Veldhuis (51.43)	April 12, 2008	Manchester, United Kingdom
3:28.22	Netherlands	Hinkelien Schreuder (52.88); Inge Dekker (52.24); Ranomi Kromowidjojo (52.12); Marleen Veldhuis (50.98)	December 19, 2008	Amsterdam, Netherlands
3:26.53	Netherlands	Inge Dekker (52.39); Femke Heemskerk (50.58); Maud van der Meer (52.55); Ranomi Kromowidjojo (51.01)	December 5, 2014	Doha, Qatar
3:25.43	Australia	Mollie O'Callaghan (52.19); Madison Wilson (51.28); Meg Harris (52.00); Emma McKeon (49.96)	December 13, 2022	Melbourne, Australia
3:25.01	United States	Kate Douglass (50.95); Katharine Berkoff (51.38); Alex Shackell (52.01); Gretchen Walsh (50.67)	December 10, 2024	Budapest, Hungary

=== Mixed long course ===
#	Time	Name	Nationality	Date	Meet	Location	Ref
1	3:45.38	Lindsay Vrooman (58.08); Kait Flederbach (58.44); Steve Schmuhl (55.90); Jackson Miller (52.96)	(United States) Indiana University Hoosiers	26 September 2013	IU Fall Frenzy	Bloomington, United States	
2	3:23.29	Tommaso D'Orsogna (49.65); Cate Campbell (52.83); James Magnussen (47.29); Bronte Campbell (53.52)	Australia	1 February 2014	BHP Billiton Aquatic Super Series	Perth, Australia	
3	3:23.05	Ryan Lochte (48.79); Nathan Adrian (47.29); Simone Manuel (53.66); Missy Franklin (53.31)	United States	8 August 2015	World Championships	Kazan, Russia	
4	3:19.60	Caeleb Dressel (47.22); Nathan Adrian (47.49); Mallory Comerford (52.71); Simone Manuel (52.18)	United States	29 July 2017	World Championships	Budapest, Hungary	
5	3:19.40	Caeleb Dressel (47.34); Zach Apple (47.34); Mallory Comerford (52.72); Simone Manuel (52.00)	United States	27 July 2019	World Championships	Gwangju, South Korea	
6	3:19.38	Jack Cartwright (48.12); Kyle Chalmers (46.98); Madison Wilson (52.25); Mollie O'Callaghan (52.03)	Australia	24 June 2022	World Championships	Budapest, Hungary	
7	3:18.83	Jack Cartwright (48.14); Kyle Chalmers (47.25); Shayna Jack (51.73); Mollie O'Callaghan (51.71)	Australia	29 July 2023	World Championships	Fukuoka, Japan	
8	3:18.48	Jack Alexy (46.91); Patrick Sammon (46.70); Kate Douglass (52.43); Torri Huske (52.44)	United States	2 August 2025	World Championships	Singapore, Singapore	

Legend: # – Record awaiting ratification by World Aquatics;
Records not set in finals: h – heat; so – swim-off

== All-time rankings ==
Tables show data for the top 25 4 × 100 m freestyle relay times and the top 10 national records:
- denotes top 10 national record by teams in the top 25 4 × 100 m freestyle relay times
- denotes lesser performances, still in the top 25 4 × 100 m freestyle relay times, by repeat nations
- denotes performances in the top 25 4 × 100 m freestyle relay times by a team with multiple nationalities
- denotes top 10 national record for other teams who fall outside the top 25 4 × 100 m freestyle relay times

=== Men long course ===
- Correct as of September 2026

Nat.#	Perf.#	Time	Athletes	Team	Date	Place	Ref.
1	1	3:08.24	Michael Phelps (47.51); Garrett Weber-Gale (47.02); Cullen Jones (47.65); Jason Lezak (46.06)	United States	11 August 2008	Beijing	
2	2	3:08.32	Amaury Leveaux (47.91); Fabien Gilot (47.05); Frédérick Bousquet (46.63); Alain Bernard (46.73)	France	11 August 2008	Beijing	
	3	3:08.97	Caeleb Dressel (47.26); Blake Pieroni (47.58); Bowe Becker (47.44); Zach Apple (46.69)	US #2	26 July 2021	Tokyo	
3	3	3:08.97	Flynn Southam (47.77); Kai Taylor (47.04); Maximillian Giuliani (47.63); Kyle Chalmers (46.53)	Australia	27 July 2025	Singapore	
	5	3:09.01	Chris Guiliano (47.51); Patrick Sammon (46.98); Destin Lasco (47.74); Jack Alexy (46.78)	US #3	14 August 2026	Irvine	
	6	3:09.06	Caeleb Dressel (47.63); Blake Pieroni (47.49); Zach Apple (46.86); Nathan Adrian (47.08)	US #4	21 July 2019	Gwangju	
	7	3:09.21	Michael Phelps (47.78); Ryan Lochte (47.03); Matt Grevers (47.61); Nathan Adrian (46.79)	US #5	26 July 2009	Rome	
	8	3:09.28	Jack Alexy (47.67); Chris Guiliano (47.33); Hunter Armstrong (46.75); Caeleb Dressel (47.53)	US #6	27 July 2024	Paris	
	9	3:09.34	Caeleb Dressel (47.67); Ryan Held (46.99); Justin Ress (47.48); Brooks Curry (47.20)	US #7	18 June 2022	Budapest	
	10	3:09.49	Flynn Southam (47.09); Kai Taylor (47.53); Harrison Turner (47.94); Kyle Chalmers (46.93)	Australia #2	24 July 2026	Glasgow	
4	11	3:09.52	Yevgeny Lagunov (47.90); Andrey Grechin (47.00); Danila Izotov (47.23); Alexander Sukhorukov (47.39)	Russia	26 July 2009	Rome	
	12	3:09.57	Kai Taylor (47.81); Jamie Jack (47.46); Edward Sommerville (47.31); Harrison Turner (46.99)	Australia #3	14 August 2026	Irvine	
5	13	3:09.58	Carlos D'Ambrosio (47.78); Thomas Ceccon (47.10); Lorenzo Zazzeri (47.36); Manuel Frigo (47.34)	Italy	27 July 2025	Singapore	
	14	3:09.64	Jack Alexy (47.24); Patrick Sammon (47.03); Chris Guiliano (47.43); Jonny Kulow (47.94)	US #8	27 July 2025	Singapore	
	15	3:09.89	Fabien Gilot (47.73); Alain Bernard (46.46); Grégory Mallet (48.28); Frédérick Bousquet (47.42)	France #2	26 July 2009	Rome	
	16	3:09.91	Eamon Sullivan (47.24); Andrew Lauterstein (47.87); Ashley Callus (47.55); Matt Targett (47.25)	Australia #4	11 August 2008	Beijing	
	17	3:09.92	Caeleb Dressel (48.10); Michael Phelps (47.12); Ryan Held (47.73); Nathan Adrian (46.97)	US #9	7 August 2016	Rio de Janeiro	
	18	3:09.93	Amaury Leveaux (48.13); Fabien Gilot (47.67); Clément Lefert (47.39); Yannick Agnel (46.74)	France #3	29 July 2012	London	
	19	3:09.97	Vladislav Grinev (47.83); Vladimir Morozov (47.62); Kliment Kolesnikov (47.50); Evgeny Rylov (47.02)	Russia #2	21 July 2019	Gwangju	
6	20	3:10.03	Hubert Kós (48.18); Szebasztián Szabó (48.29); Nándor Németh (47.27); Kristóf Milák (46.29)	Hungary	13 August 2026	Paris	
	21	3:10.06	Caeleb Dressel (47.26); Townley Haas (47.46); Blake Pieroni (48.09); Nathan Adrian (47.25)	US #10	23 July 2017	Budapest	
	22	3:10.11	Alessandro Miressi (47.72); Thomas Ceccon (47.45); Lorenzo Zazzeri (47.31); Manuel Frigo (47.63)	Italy #2	26 July 2021	Tokyo	
	23	3:10.12	Ivan Giryov (48.14); Vasilii Kukushkin (47.77); Aleksandr Shchegolev (47.89); Egor Kornev (46.32)	Russia #3 (Note: Competed for Neutral Athletes B team.)	13 August 2026	Paris	
	24	3:10.16	Jack Cartwright (47.84); Flynn Southam (47.85); Kai Taylor (47.91); Kyle Chalmers (46.56)	Australia #5	13 July 2023	Fukuoka	
	25	3:10.22	Matthew Temple (48.07); Zac Incerti (47.55); Alexander Graham (48.16); Kyle Chalmers (46.44)	Australia #6	26 July 2021	Tokyo	
7		3:10.34	Gabriel Santos (48.30); Marcelo Chierighini (46.85); César Cielo (48.01); Bruno Fratus (47.18)	Brazil	23 July 2017	Budapest	
8		3:10.60	Zhao Jiayue (48.43); Wang Haoyu (47.77); Zhang Zhanshuo (47.65); Pan Zhanle (46.75)	China	24 September 2026	Tokyo	
9		3:10.73	Jacob Mills (48.51); Matthew Richards (47.32); Jacob Whittle (47.67); Duncan Scott (47.23)	Great Britain	27 July 2025	Singapore	
10		3:10.82	Brent Hayden (47.99); Joshua Liendo (47.51); Yuri Kisil (47.15); Markus Thormeyer (48.17)	Canada	26 July 2021	Tokyo	

=== Men short course ===
- Correct as of September 2026

Nat.#	Perf.#	Time	Athletes	Team	Date	Place	Ref.
1	1	3:01.66	Jack Alexy (45.05); Luke Hobson (45.18); Kieran Smith (46.01); Chris Guiliano (45.42)	United States	10 December 2024	Budapest	
2	2	3:02.75	Alessandro Miressi (46.15); Paolo Conte Bonin (45.93); Leonardo Deplano (45.54); Thomas Ceccon (45.13)	Italy	13 December 2022	Melbourne	
	3	3:02.78	Evgeny Rylov (46.09); Kliment Kolesnikov (45.25); Chad le Clos (45.40); Florent Manaudou (46.04)	Energy Standard; Russia; Russia; South Africa; France	21 November 2020	Budapest	
	4	3:03.03	Caeleb Dressel (45.66); Blake Pieroni (45.75); Michael Chadwick (45.86); Ryan Held (45.76)	US #2	11 December 2018	Hanghzou	
3	5	3:03.11	Vladislav Grinev (46.38); Sergei Fesikov (46.21); Vladimir Morozov (45.06); Kliment Kolesnikov (45.46)	Russia	11 December 2018	Hangzhou	
	6	3:03.30	Nathan Adrian (45.08); Matt Grevers (44.68); Garrett Weber-Gale (47.43); Michael Phelps (46.11)	US #3	19 December 2009	Manchester	
	7	3:03.45	Kliment Kolesnikov (46.44); Andrey Minakov (45.61); Vladislav Grinev (45.87); Aleksandr Shchegolev (45.53)	Russia #2 (Note: Competed as the Russian Swimming Federation under no flag.)	16 December 2021	Abu Dhabi	
	8	3:03.46	Caeleb Dressel (45.18); Kacper Majchrzak (46.53); Tate Jackson (46.33); Justin Ress (45.42)	Cali Condors; United States; Poland; United States; United States	21 November 2020	Budapest	
	9	3:03.61	Alessandro Miressi (46.12); Thomas Ceccon (45.71); Leonardo Deplano (45.98); Lorenzo Zazzeri (45.80)	Italy #2	16 December 2021	Abu Dhabi	
	10	3:03.65	Alessandro Miressi (45.95); Leonardo Deplano (45.76); Lorenzo Zazzeri (46.21); Manuel Frigo (45.71)	Italy #3	10 December 2024	Budapest	
4	11	3:03.78	Clément Mignon (47.05); Fabien Gilot (46.13); Florent Manaudou (44.80); Mehdy Metella (45.80)	France	3 December 2014	Doha	
	12	3:04.18	Vladimir Morozov (45.51); Sergei Fesikov (46.01); Danila Izotov (45.79); Mikhail Polishchuk (46.87)	Russia #3	3 December 2014	Doha	
	13	3:04.46	Alessandro Miressi (46.08); Leonardo Deplano (46.19); Manuel Frigo (46.51); Paolo Conte Bonin (45.68)	Italy #4	13 December 2022	Melbourne	
5	13	3:04.46	Kamil Sieradzki (46.33); Jakub Majerski (46.04); Ksawery Masiuk (45.64); Kacper Stokowski (46.45)	Poland	10 December 2024	Budapest	
	15	3:04.47	Dylan Carter (46.39); Zac Incerti (46.87); Duncan Scott (46.09); Kyle Chalmers (45.12)	London Roar; Trinidad and Tobago; Australia; Great Britain; Australia	25 November 2021	Eindhoven	
	16	3:04.55	Kyle Chalmers (45.53); Katsumi Nakamura (46.63); Zac Incerti (46.49); Dylan Carter (45.90)	London Roar; Australia; Japan; Australia; Trinidad and Tobago	20 November 2021	Eindhoven	
	17	3:04.62	Egor Kornev (45.94); Dmitrii Zhavoronkov (46.22); Aleksandr Shchegolev (46.65); Andrey Minakov (45.81)	Russia #4	10 December 2024	Budapest	
6	18	3:04.63	Flynn Southam (47.04); Matthew Temple (46.06); Thomas Neill (46.55); Kyle Chalmers (44.98)	Australia	13 December 2022	Melbourne	
	19	3:04.78	Alain Bernard (46.78); Frédérick Bousquet (45.92); Fabien Gilot (45.75); Yannick Agnel (46.33)	France #2	15 December 2010	Dubai	
	19	3:04.78	Maxime Rooney (46.26); Tom Shields (46.05); Kristian Gkolomeev (45.76); Dylan Carter (46.71)	LA Current; United States; United States; Greece; Trinidad and Tobago	15 November 2020	Budapest	
	21	3:04.82	Evgeny Lagunov (46.68); Sergey Fesikov (45.87); Nikita Lobintsev (45.79); Danila Izotov (46.48)	Russia #5	15 December 2010	Dubai	
	21	3:04.82	Kacper Majchrzak (46.26); Caeleb Dressel (46.05); Jesse Puts (45.76); Justin Ress (46.71)	Cali Condors; Poland; United States; Netherlands; United States	15 November 2020	Budapest	
	23	3:04.84	Kyle Chalmers (45.80); Duncan Scott (46.62); Katsumi Nakamura (46.27); Dylan Carter (46.15)	London Roar; Australia; Great Britain; Japan; Trinidad and Tobago	3 December 2021	Eindhoven	
7	23	3:04.84	Marco Antonio Ferreira (46.44); Guilherme Caribé (45.79); Kaique Alves (45.82); Leonardo Coelho Santos (46.79)	Brazil	10 December 2024	Budapest	
	25	3:04.93	Pedro Spajari (47.05); Marcelo Chierighini (45.83); Szebasztian Szabo (46.26); Alessandro Miressi (45.79)	Aqua Centurions; Brazil; Brazil; Hungary; Italy	24 October 2020	Budapest	
8		3:05.57	Sergio de Celis (46.48); Luis Domínguez (46.40); Miguel Pérez-Godoy (46.13); Nacho Campos (46.56)	Spain	10 December 2024	Budapest	
9		3:05.58	Jere Hribar (46.16); Nikola Miljenić (46.24); Vlaho Nenadić (46.70); Toni Dragoja (46.58)	Croatia	10 December 2024	Budapest	
10		3:06.10	Stan Pijnenburg (46.64); Thom de Boer (46.60); Nyls Korstanje (46.82); Jesse Puts (46.04)	Netherlands	16 December 2024	Abu Dhabi	

=== Women long course ===
- Correct as of September 2026

Nat.#	Perf.#	Time	Athletes	Team	Date	Place	Ref.
1	1	3:27.96	Mollie O'Callaghan (52.08); Shayna Jack (51.69); Meg Harris (52.29); Emma McKeon (51.90)	Australia	23 July 2023	Fukuoka	
	2	3:28.92	Mollie O'Callaghan (52.24); Shayna Jack (52.35); Emma McKeon (52.39); Meg Harris (51.94)	Australia #2	27 July 2024	Paris	
2	3	3:29.32	Kate Douglass (51.69); Gretchen Walsh (52.23); Torri Huske (52.79); Simone Manuel (52.61)	United States	14 August 2026	Irvine	
	4	3:29.69	Bronte Campbell (53.01); Meg Harris (53.09); Emma McKeon (51.35); Cate Campbell (52.24)	Australia #3	25 July 2021	Tokyo	
	5	3:30.05	Shayna Jack (54.03); Bronte Campbell (52.03); Emma McKeon (52.99); Cate Campbell (51.00)	Australia #4	5 April 2018	Gold Coast	
	6	3:30.20	Kate Douglass (52.98); Gretchen Walsh (52.55); Torri Huske (52.06); Simone Manuel (52.61)	US #2	27 July 2024	Paris	
	7	3:30.21	Bronte Campbell (52.85); Brianna Throssell (53.34); Emma McKeon (52.57); Cate Campbell (51.45)	Australia #5	21 July 2019	Gwangju	
3	8	3:30.30	Yang Junxuan (52.48); Cheng Yujie (52.76); Zhang Yufei (52.75); Wu Qingfeng (52.31)	China	27 July 2024	Paris	
	9	3:30.60	Mollie O'Callaghan (52.79); Meg Harris (51.87); Milla Jansen (52.89); Olivia Wunsch (53.05)	Australia #6	27 July 2025	Singapore	
	10	3:30.64	Madison Wilson (53.22); Shayna Jack (52.72); Mollie O'Callaghan (52.66); Emma McKeon (52.04)	Australia #7	30 July 2022	Birmingham	
	11	3:30.65	Emma McKeon (53.41); Brittany Elmslie (53.12); Bronte Campbell (52.15); Cate Campbell (51.97)	Australia #8	6 August 2016	Rio de Janeiro	
	12	3:30.95	Mollie O'Callaghan (52.70); Madison Wilson (52.60); Meg Harris (53.00); Shayna Jack (52.65)	Australia #9	18 June 2022	Budapest	
	13	3:30.98	Bronte Campbell (53.15); Melanie Schlanger (52.76); Emma McKeon (52.91); Cate Campbell (52.16)	Australia #10	24 July 2014	Glasgow	
	14	3:31.02	Mallory Comerford (52.98); Abbey Weitzeil (52.66); Kelsi Dahlia (53.46); Simone Manuel (51.92)	US #3	21 July 2019	Gwangju	
	15	3:31.04	Simone Manuel (53.09); Kate Douglass (51.90); Erin Gemmell (53.17); Torri Huske (52.88)	US #4	27 July 2025	Singapore	
	16	3:31.11	Meg Harris (52.51); Alexandria Perkins (53.05); Milla Jansen (53.03); Olivia Wunsch (52.52)	Australia #11	14 August 2026	Irvine	
	17	3:31.40	Meg Harris (53.07); Shayna Jack (52.64); Alexandria Perkins (52.88); Mollie O'Callaghan (52.81)	Australia #12	24 July 2026	Glasgow	
	18	3:31.48	Emily Seebohm (53.92); Emma McKeon (53.57); Bronte Campbell (51.77); Cate Campbell (52.22)	Australia #13	2 August 2015	Kazan	
	19	3:31.52	Shayna Jack (52.28); Brianna Throssell (53.95); Meg Harris (52.55); Madison Wilson (52.76)	Australia #14	23 July 2023	Fukuoka	
	20	3:31.57	Olivia Wunsch (53.94); Bronte Campbell (53.46); Meg Harris (52.23); Emma McKeon (51.94)	Australia #15	27 July 2024	Paris	
	21	3:31.58	Emily Seebohm (54.56); Shayna Jack (53.10); Emma McKeon (52.56); Cate Campbell (51.36)	Australia #16	9 August 2018	Tokyo	
4	22	3:31.72	Inge Dekker (53.61); Ranomi Kromowidjojo (52.30); Femke Heemskerk (53.03); Marleen Veldhuis (52.78)	Netherlands	26 July 2009	Rome	
	22	3:31.72	Mallory Comerford (52.59); Kelsi Worrell (53.16); Katie Ledecky (53.83); Simone Manuel (52.14)	US #5	23 July 2017	Budapest	
	24	3:31.73	Mollie O'Callaghan (53.08); Meg Harris (52.73); Madison Wilson (53.10); Bronte Campbell (52.82)	Australia #17	24 July 2021	Tokyo	
5	25	3:31.78	Kayla Sanchez (53.72); Taylor Ruck (52.19); Penny Oleksiak (52.69); Maggie Mac Neil (53.18)	Canada	21 July 2019	Gwangju	
6		3:31.83	Britta Steffen (52.22); Daniela Samulski (53.49); Petra Dallmann (53.75); Daniela Schreiber (52.37)	Germany	26 July 2009	Rome	
7		3:33.19	Emma Virginia Menicucci (53.85); Sara Curtis (52.29); Chiara Tarantino (53.68); Alessandra Mao (53.37)	Italy	12 August 2026	Paris	
8		3:33.69	Daria Klepikova (53.22); Aleksandra Kuznetsova (53.85); Alina Gaifutdinova (53.54); Kira Manokhina (53.08)	Russia	12 August 2026	Paris	
9		3:33.79	Sarah Sjöström (52.53); Michelle Coleman (52.98); Sara Junevik (54.41); Louise Hansson (53.87)	Sweden	27 July 2024	Paris	
10		3:33.90	Anna Hopkin (53.67); Lucy Hope (53.53); Abbie Wood (54.19); Freya Anderson (52.51)	Great Britain	23 July 2023	Fukuoka	

=== Women short course ===
- Correct as of September 2026

Nat.#	Perf.#	Time	Athletes	Team	Date	Place	Ref.
1	1	3:25.01	Kate Douglass (50.95); Katharine Berkoff (51.38); Alex Shackell (52.01); Gretchen Walsh (50.67)	United States	10 December 2024	Budapest	
	2	3:25.37	Siobhan Haughey (50.94); Pernille Blume (51.59); Femke Heemskerk (51.29); Sarah Sjostrom (51.55)	Energy Standard; Hong Kong; Denmark; Netherlands; Sweden	21 November 2020	Budapest	
1	3	3:25.43	Mollie O'Callaghan (52.19); Madison Wilson (51.28); Meg Harris (52.00); Emma McKeon (49.96)	Australia	13 December 2022	Melbourne	
	4	3:25.82	Siobhan Haughey (51.35); Pernille Blume (51.67); Femke Heemskerk (51.53); Sarah Sjostrom (51.27)	Energy Standard; Hong Kong; Denmark; Netherlands; Sweden	14 November 2020	Budapest	
	5	3:26.29	Torri Huske (51.73); Kate Douglass (51.17); Claire Curzan (51.59); Erika Brown (51.80)	US #2	13 December 2022	Melbourne	
	6	3:26.48	Penny Oleksiak (52.89); Sarah Sjöström (51.45); Kayla Sanchez (51.60); Femke Heemskerk (51.44)	Energy Standard; Canada; Sweden; Canada; Netherlands	20 December 2019	Las Vegas	
3	7	3:26.53	Inge Dekker (52.39); Femke Heemskerk (50.58); Maud van der Meer (52.55); Ranomi Kromowidjojo (51.01)	Netherlands	5 December 2014	Doha	
	8	3:26.55	Penny Oleksiak (52.06); Sarah Sjöström (51.41); Kayla Sanchez (51.56); Femke Heemskerk (50.62)	Energy Standard; Canada; Sweden; Canada; Netherlands	23 November 2019	London	
	9	3:26.64	Anna Hopkin (51.98); Maria Kamaneva (51.90); Marie Wattel (51.77); Freya Anderson (50.99)	London Roar; Great Britain; Russia; France; Great Britain	14 November 2020	Budapest	
	10	3:26.71	Bronte Campbell (52.58); Emma McKeon (51.43); Marie Wattel (52.13); Cate Campbell (50.56)	London Roar; Australia; Australia; France; Australia	20 December 2019	Las Vegas	
	11	3:27.09	Beryl Gastaldello (52.17); Anastasia Gorbenko (51.99); Andi Murez (51.58); Abbey Weitzeil (51.35)	LA Current; France; Israel; Israel; United States	21 November 2020	Budapest	
	12	3:27.17	Freya Anderson (51.43); Maria Kamaneva (52.24); Marie Wattel (52.22); Anna Hopkin (51.28)	London Roar; Great Britain; Russia; France; Great Britain	21 November 2020	Budapest	
	13	3:27.44	Abbey Weitzeil (51.99); Madison Wilson (51.71); Anastasia Gorbenko (51.85); Béryl Gastaldello (51.81)	LA Current; United States; Australia; Israel; France	20 November 2021	Eindhoven	
	14	3:27.48	Anna Hopkin (52.08); Freya Anderson (51.52); Maria Kameneva (52.11); Marie Wattel (51.77)	London Roar; Great Britain; Great Britain; Russia; France	30 October 2020	Budapest	
	15	3:27.65	Olivia Smoliga (52.35); Kelsi Dahlia (51.94); Natalie Hinds (51.74); Mallory Comerford (51.62)	Cali Condors; United States; United States; United States; United States	20 December 2019	Las Vegas	
	15	3:27.65	Siobhán Haughey (51.32); Femke Heemskerk (51.63); Fanny Teijonsalo (52.91); Sarah Sjöström (51.79)	Energy Standard; Hong Kong; Netherlands; Finland; Sweden	18 September 2021	Naples	
	17	3:27.70	Natalie Coughlin (52.25); Abbey Weitzeil (51.57); Madison Kennedy (51.82); Shannon Vreeland (52.06)	US #3	5 December 2014	Doha	
	18	3:27.73	Femke Heemskerk (52.49); Siobhán Haughey (50.70); Fanny Teijonsalo (52.81); Sarah Sjöström (51.73)	Energy Standard; Netherlands; Hong Kong; Finland; Sweden	25 November 2021	Eindhoven	
	19	3:27.77	Anastasia Gorbenko (52.59); Andi Murez (51.69); Aly Tetzloff (52.46); Abbey Weitzeil (51.03)	LA Current; Israel; Israel; United States; United States	30 October 2020	Budapest	
	20	3:27.78	Olivia Smoliga (52.71); Lia Neal (52.58); Mallory Comerford (51.09); Kelsi Dahlia (51.40)	US #4	11 December 2018	Hangzhou	
	21	3:27.87	Siobhán Haughey (51.06); Femke Heemskerk (51.88); Fanny Teijonsalo (53.08); Sarah Sjöström (51.85)	Energy Standard; Hong Kong; Netherlands; Finland; Sweden	3 December 2021	Eindhoven	
	22	3:27.90	Jeanette Ottesen (53.31); Emma McKeon (51.03); Marie Wattel (52.71); Cate Campbell (50.85)	London Roar; Denmark; Australia; France; Australia	19 October 2019	Lewisville	
	23	3:28.01	Kayla Sanchez (52.18); Michelle Coleman (51.49); Louise Hansson (52.32); Katarzyna Wasick (52.02)	Toronto Titans; Canada; Sweden; Sweden; Poland	9 September 2021	Naples	
	24	3:28.02	Kim Busch (53.19); Femke Heemskerk (50.93); Maaike de Waard (53.13); Ranomi Kromowidjojo (50.77)	Netherlands #2	11 December 2018	Hangzhou	
	25	3:28.04	Emma McKeon (51.36); Marie Wattel (52.32); Kira Toussaint (52.34); Freya Anderson (52.02)	London Roar; Australia; France; Netherlands; Great Britain	13 November 2021	Eindhoven	
4		3:28.06	Rebecca Smith (52.68); Taylor Ruck (51.49); Maggie Mac Neil (51.11); Katerine Savard (52.78)	Canada	13 December 2022	Melbourne	
5		3:28.73	Daria Klepivoka (51.96); Daria Trofimova (51.36); Milana Stepanova (53.27); Arina Surkova (52.14)	Russia	10 December 2024	Budapest	
6		3:28.80	Sarah Sjöström (51.45); Michelle Coleman (52.06); Sophie Hansson (53.41); Louise Hansson (51.88)	Sweden	16 December 2021	Abu Dhabi	
7		3:29.48	Erika Ferraioli (52.70); Silvia Di Pietro (52.30); Aglaia Pezzato (52.72); Federica Pellegrini (51.76)	Italy	5 December 2014	Doha	
8		3:29.81	Tang Yi (52.27); Zhu Qianwei (52.60); Pang Jiaying (52.94); Li Zhesi (52.00)	China	18 December 2010	Dubai	
9		3:29.86	Jeanette Ottesen (51.91); Julie Levisen (53.26); Mie Nielsen (52.03); Pernille Blume (52.66)	Denmark	5 December 2014	Doha	
10		3:30.10	Nikolett Pádár (52.69); Panna Ugrai (52.93); Petra Senánszky (52.58); Minna Abraham (51.90)	Hungary	10 December 2024	Budapest	

=== Mixed long course ===
- Correct as of September 2026

Nat.#	Perf.#	Time	Athletes	Team	Date	Place	Ref.
1	1	3:18.48	Jack Alexy (46.91); Patrick Sammon (46.70); Kate Douglass (52.43); Torri Huske (52.44)	United States	2 August 2025	Singapore	
2	2	3:18.83	Jack Cartwright (48.14); Kyle Chalmers (47.25); Shayna Jack (51.73); Mollie O'Callaghan (51.71)	Australia	29 July 2023	Fukuoka	
	3	3:19.36	Flynn Southam (47.29); Kyle Chalmers (47.62); Shayna Jack (52.52); Meg Harris (52.03)	Australia #2	25 July 2026	Glasgow	
	4	3:19.38	Jack Cartwright (48.12); Kyle Chalmers (46.98); Madison Wilson (52.25); Mollie O'Callaghan (52.03)	Australia #3	24 June 2022	Budapest	
	5	3:19.40	Caeleb Dressel (47.34); Zach Apple (47.34); Mallory Comerford (52.72); Simone Manuel (52.00)	US #2	27 July 2019	Gwangju	
	6	3:19.60	Caeleb Dressel (47.22); Nathan Adrian (47.49); Mallory Comerford (52.71); Simone Manuel (52.18)	US #3	29 July 2017	Budapest	
3	7	3:19.68	Egor Kornev (47.69); Ivan Giryov (47.08); Daria Trofimova (52.42); Daria Klepikova (52.49)	Russia	2 August 2025	Singapore	
	8	3:19.95	Egor Kornev (47.05); Ivan Giryov (47.67); Daria Klepikova (52.21); Kira Manokhina (53.02)	Russia #2	14 August 2026	Paris	
	9	3:19.97	Kyle Chalmers (47.37); Clyde Lewis (48.18); Emma McKeon (52.06); Bronte Campbell (52.36)	Australia #4	27 July 2019	Gwangju	
4	10	3:20.09	Sean Niewold (47.95); Merlin Belmon (48.55); Milou van Wijk (52.85); Marrit Steenbergen (50.74)	Netherlands	14 August 2026	Paris	
5	11	3:20.61	Joshua Liendo (48.02); Javier Acevedo (47.96); Kayla Sanchez (52.52); Penny Oleksiak (52.11)	Canada	24 June 2022	Budapest	
6	12	3:20.80	Carlos D'Ambrosio (47.95); Thomas Ceccon (48.55); Sara Curtis (52.85); Emma Virginia Menicucci (50.74)	Italy	14 August 2026	Paris	
	13	3:20.82	Jack Alexy (47.68); Matt King (47.78); Abbey Weitzeil (52.94); Kate Douglass (52.42)	US #4	29 July 2023	Fukuoka	
	14	3:21.09	Ryan Held (47.93); Brooks Curry (47.72); Torri Huske (52.70); Claire Curzan (52.84)	US #5	24 June 2022	Budapest	
	15	3:21.18	William Yang (48.80); Kyle Chalmers (47.55); Mollie O'Callaghan (52.62); Emma McKeon (52.21)	Australia #5	29 July 2022	Birmingham	
7	15	3:21.18	Pan Zhanle (47.29); Wang Haoyu (47.41); Li Bingjie (53.11); Yu Yiting (53.37)	China	17 February 2024	Doha	
8	17	3:21.35	Maxime Grousset (47.62); Yann Le Goff (47.77); Marie Wattel (52.74); Béryl Gastaldello (53.22)	France	2 August 2025	Singapore	
	18	3:21.48	Chris Guiliano (47.66); Johny Kulow (47.68); Simone Manuel (52.67); Kate Douglass (53.47)	US #6	2 August 2025	Singapore	
	18	3:21.48	Manuel Frigo (48.18); Carlos D'Ambrosio (47.34); Sara Curtis (52.40); Emma Virginia Menicucci (53.56)	Italy #2	2 August 2025	Singapore	
9	20	3:21.68	Matt Richards (47.83); Duncan Scott (47.46); Anna Hopkin (53.30); Freya Anderson (53.09)	Great Britain	29 July 2023	Fukuoka	
	21	3:21.71	Sean Niewold (48.60); Renzo Tjon-A-Joe (47.87); Milou van Wijk (53.06); Marrit Steenbergen (52.18)	Netherlands #2	2 August 2025	Singapore	
	22	3:21.78	Kai Taylor (48.01); Jack Cartwright (47.90); Shayna Jack (52.38); Brianna Throssell (53.49)	Australia #6	17 February 2024	Doha	
	23	3:21.81	Ben Schwietert (49.12); Kyle Stolk (47.80); Femke Heemskerk (52.33); Ranomi Kromowidjojo (52.56)	Netherlands #3	29 July 2017	Budapest	
	24	3:21.88	Flynn Southam (48.69); Jack Cartwright (47.81); Madison Wilson (52.98); Meg Harris (52.40)	Australia #7	29 July 2023	Fukuoka	
	25	3:22.07	Jérémy Stravius (48.81); Mehdy Metella (47.45); Marie Wattel (53.47); Charlotte Bonnet (52.34)	France #2	8 August 2018	Glasgow	
	25	3:22.07	Duncan Scott (48.20); Thomas Dean (48.11); Anna Hopkin (52.88); Freya Anderson (52.88)	Great Britain #2	22 May 2021	Budapest	
10		3:22.91	Luca Hoek (47.56); Miguel Pérez-Godoy (47.81); María Daza (53.50); Irene Ciércoles (54.04)	Spain	14 August 2026	Paris	

== Olympic champions ==
=== Men ===
Edition	Winner	Time	Notes	Ref.
(Japan) Tokyo 1964	United States	3:33.2	WR	
Mexico City 1968	United States	3:31.7	OR	
(West Germany) Munich 1972	United States	3:26.42	WR	
1976–1980	not included in the program			
(United States) Los Angeles 1984	United States	3:19.03	WR	
(South Korea) Seoul 1988	United States	3:16.53	WR	
(Spain) Barcelona 1992	United States	3:16.74		
(United States) Atlanta 1996	United States	3:15.41	OR	
(Australia) Sydney 2000	Australia	3:13.67	WR	
(Greece) Athens 2004	South Africa	3:13.17	WR	
(China) Beijing 2008	United States	3:08.24	WR	
(United Kingdom) London 2012	France	3:09.93		
(Brazil) Rio de Janeiro 2016	United States	3:09.92		
(Japan) Tokyo 2020	United States	3:08.97		
(France) Paris 2024	United States	3:09.28		

=== Women ===
Edition	Winner	Time	Notes	Ref.
(Sweden) Stockholm 1912	Great Britain	5:52.8	WR	
(Belgium) Antwerp 1920	United States	5:11.6	WR	
(France) Paris 1924	United States	4:58.8	WR	
(Netherlands) Amsterdam 1928	United States	4:47.6	WR	
(United States) Los Angeles 1932	United States	4:38.0	WR	
(Nazi Germany) Berlin 1936	Netherlands	4:36.0	OR	
(United Kingdom) London 1948	United States	4:29.2	OR	
(Finland) Helsinki 1952	Hungary	4:24.4	WR	
(Australia) Melbourne 1956	Australia	4:17.1	WR	
(Italy) Rome 1960	United States	4:08.9	WR	
(Japan) Tokyo 1964	United States	4:03.8	WR	
Mexico City 1968	United States	4:02.5	OR	
(West Germany) Munich 1972	United States	3:55.19	WR	
(Canada) Montreal 1976	United States	3:44.82	WR	
(Soviet Union) Moscow 1980	East Germany	3:42.71	WR	
(United States) Los Angeles 1984	United States	3:43.43		
(South Korea) Seoul 1988	East Germany	3:40.63	OR	
(Spain) Barcelona 1992	United States	3:39.46	WR	
(United States) Atlanta 1996	United States	3:39.29	OR	
(Australia) Sydney 2000	United States	3:36.61	WR	
(Greece) Athens 2004	Australia	3:35.94	WR	
(China) Beijing 2008	Netherlands	3:33.76	OR	
(United Kingdom) London 2012	Australia	3:33.15	OR	
(Brazil) Rio de Janeiro 2016	Australia	3:30.65	WR	
(Japan) Tokyo 2020	Australia	3:29.69	WR	
(France) Paris 2024	Australia	3:28.92	OR	

== World champions (long course) ==
=== Men ===
Edition	Winner	Time	Notes	Ref.
(Socialist Federal Republic of Yugoslavia) Belgrade 1973	United States (USA)	3:27.18	CR	
(Colombia) Cali 1975	United States (USA)	3:24.85	WR	
(West Germany) West Berlin 1978	United States (USA)	3:19.74	WR	
(Ecuador) Guayaquil 1982	United States (USA)	3:19.26	WR	
(Spain) Madrid 1986	United States (USA)	3:19.89		
(Australia) Perth 1991	United States (USA)	3:17.15	CR	
(Italy) Rome 1994	United States (USA)	3:16.90	CR	
(Australia) Perth 1998	United States (USA)	3:16.69	CR	
(Japan) Fukuoka 2001	Australia (AUS)	3:14.10	CR	
(Spain) Barcelona 2003	Russia (RUS)	3:14.06	CR	
(Canada) Montreal 2005	United States (USA)	3:13.77	CR	
(Australia) Melbourne 2007	United States (USA)	3:12.72	CR	
(Italy) Rome 2009	United States (USA)	3:09.21	CR	
(China) Shanghai 2011	Australia (AUS)	3:11.00		
(Spain) Barcelona 2013	France (FRA)	3:11.18		
(Russia) Kazan 2015	France (FRA)	3:10.74		
(Hungary) Budapest 2017	United States (USA)	3:10.06		
(South Korea) Gwangju 2019	United States (USA)	3:09.06	CR	
(Hungary) Budapest 2022	United States (USA)	3:09.34		
(Japan) Fukuoka 2023	Australia (AUS)	3:10.16		
(Qatar) Doha 2024	China (CHN)	3:11.08		
Singapore 2025	Australia (AUS)	3:08.97	CR	

=== Women ===
Edition	Winner	Time	Notes	Ref.
(Socialist Federal Republic of Yugoslavia) Belgrade 1973	East Germany (GDR)	3:52.45	WR	
(Colombia) Cali 1975	East Germany (GDR)	3:49.37	WR	
(West Germany) West Berlin 1978	United States (USA)	3:43.43	WR	
(Ecuador) Guayaquil 1982	East Germany (GDR)	3:43.97		
(Spain) Madrid 1986	East Germany (GDR)	3:40.57	WR	
(Australia) Perth 1991	United States (USA)	3:43.26		
(Italy) Rome 1994	China (CHN)	3:37.91	WR	
(Australia) Perth 1998	United States (USA)	3:42.11		
(Japan) Fukuoka 2001	Germany (GER)	3:39.58		
(Spain) Barcelona 2003	United States (USA)	3:38.09		
(Canada) Montreal 2005	Australia (AUS)	3:37.32	CR	
(Australia) Melbourne 2007	Australia (AUS)	3:35.48	CR	
(Italy) Rome 2009	Netherlands (NED)	3:31.72	WR	
(China) Shanghai 2011	Netherlands (NED)	3:33.96		
(Spain) Barcelona 2013	United States (USA)	3:32.31		
(Russia) Kazan 2015	Australia (AUS)	3:31.48	CR	
(Hungary) Budapest 2017	United States (USA)	3:31.72		
(South Korea) Gwangju 2019	Australia (AUS)	3:30.21	CR	
(Hungary) Budapest 2022	Australia (AUS)	3:30.95		
(Japan) Fukuoka 2023	Australia (AUS)	3:27.96	WR	
(Qatar) Doha 2024	Netherlands (NED)	3:36.61		
Singapore 2025	Australia (AUS)	3:30.60		

=== Mixed ===
Edition	Winner	Time	Notes	Ref.
(Russia) Kazan 2015	United States (USA)	3:23.05	WR	
(Hungary) Budapest 2017	United States (USA)	3:19.60	WR	
(South Korea) Gwangju 2019	United States (USA)	3:19.40	WR	
(Hungary) Budapest 2022	Australia (AUS)	3:19.38	WR	
(Japan) Fukuoka 2023	Australia (AUS)	3:18.83	WR	
(Qatar) Doha 2024	China (CHN)	3:21.18		
Singapore 2025	United States (USA)	3:18.48	WR	
2027	not included in the program			

== World champions (short course) ==
=== Men ===
Edition	Winner	Time	Notes	Ref.
(Spain) Palma de Mallorca 1993	Brazil (BRA)	3:12.11	WR	
(Brazil) Rio de Janeiro 1995	Brazil (BRA)	3:12.42		
(Sweden) Gothenburg 1997	Germany (GER)	3:14.08		
Hong Kong 1999	Australia (AUS)	3:11.21	CR	
(Greece) Athens 2000	Sweden (SWE)	3:09.57	WR	
(Russia) Moscow 2002	United States (USA)	3:10.64		
(United States) Indianapolis 2004	United States (USA)	3:09.96		
(China) Shanghai 2006	Italy (ITA)	3:10.74		
(United Kingdom) Manchester 2008	United States (USA)	3:08.44	WR	
(United Arab Emirates) Dubai 2010	France (FRA)	3:04.78	CR	
(Turkey) Istanbul 2012	United States (USA)	3:06.40		
(Qatar) Doha 2014	France (FRA)	3:03.78	CR	
(Canada) Windsor 2016	Russia (RUS)	3:05.90		
(China) Hangzhou 2018	United States (USA)	3:03.03	WR	
(United Arab Emirates) Abu Dhabi 2021	Russian Swimming Federation (RSF)	3:03.45		
(Australia) Melbourne 2022	Italy (ITA)	3:02.75	WR	
(Hungary) Budapest 2024	United States (USA)	3:01.66	WR	

=== Women ===
Edition	Winner	Time	Notes	Ref.
(Spain) Palma de Mallorca 1993	China (CHN)	3:35.97	WR	
(Brazil) Rio de Janeiro 1995	China (CHN)	3:37.00		
(Sweden) Gothenburg 1997	China (CHN)	3:34.55	WR	
Hong Kong 1999	Great Britain (GBR)	3:36.88		
(Greece) Athens 2000	Sweden (SWE)	3:35.54		
(Russia) Moscow 2002	Sweden (SWE)	3:35.09		
(United States) Indianapolis 2004	United States (USA)	3:35.07		
(China) Shanghai 2006	Netherlands (NED)	3:33.32	WR	
(United Kingdom) Manchester 2008	Netherlands (NED)	3:29.42	WR	
(United Arab Emirates) Dubai 2010	Netherlands (NED)	3:28.54	CR	
(Turkey) Istanbul 2012	United States (USA)	3:31.01		
(Qatar) Doha 2014	Netherlands (NED)	3:26.53	WR	
(Canada) Windsor 2016	United States (USA)	3:28.82		
(China) Hangzhou 2018	United States (USA)	3:27.78		
(United Arab Emirates) Abu Dhabi 2021	United States (USA)	3:28.52		
(United Arab Emirates) Abu Dhabi 2021	Canada (CAN)	3:28.52		
(Australia) Melbourne 2022	Australia (AUS)	3:25.43	WR	
(Hungary) Budapest 2024	United States (USA)	3:25.01	WR	
