= Swimming at the 1973 World Aquatics Championships – Women's 4 × 100 metre medley relay =

Women's 4 × 100 metre medley relay at the 1973 World Aquatics Championships
- Dates: September 4, 1973
- Nations: 13
- Winning time: 4:16.844 WR

Medalists
gold medal	Ulrike Richter; Renate Vogel; Rosemarie Kother; Kornelia Ender	East Germany
silver medal	Melissa Belote; Marcia Morey; Deena Deardurff; Shirley Babashoff	United States
bronze medal	Angelika Grieser; Petra Nows; Gudrun Beckmann; Jutta Weber	West Germany

The women's 4 × 100 metre medley relay competition of the swimming events at the 1973 World Aquatics Championships took place on September 4.

== Records ==
Prior to the competition, the existing world and championship records were as follows.

World record	United States (USA); Melissa Belote; Cathy Carr; Deena Deardurff; Sandy Neilson	4:20.75	Munich, West Germany	3 September 1972
Competition record	N/A	N/A	N/A	N/A

The following records were established during the competition:

Date	Event	Nation	Athletes	Time	Record
4 September	Heat	East Germany		4:25.879	CR
4 September	Final	East Germany	Ulrike Richter; Renate Vogel; Rosemarie Kother; Kornelia Ender	4:16.844	WR

== Results ==
=== Heats ===
13 teams participated in 2 heats.

Rank	Heat	Lane	Nation	Athletes	Time	Notes
1	1	-	East Germany		4:25.879	Q, CR
2	2	-	United States		4:26.889	Q
3	2	-	Sweden		4:29.029	Q
4	1	-	Netherlands		4:30.390	Q
5	2	-	West Germany		4:32.048	Q
6	2	-	Australia		4:33.745	Q
7	1	-	Canada		4:34.051	Q
8	1	-	Soviet Union		4:34.477	Q
9	1	-	Hungary		4:35.702	
10	1	-	Great Britain	Margaret Kelly; Joanne Atkinson	4:37.101	
11	2	-	Italy		4:37.511	
12	2	-	Brazil		4:43.651	
13	2	-	Puerto Rico		4:50.198	

=== Final ===
The results of the final are below.

Rank	Lane	Nation	Athletes	Time	Notes
1st place, gold medalist(s)	-	East Germany	Ulrike Richter (1:04.99); Renate Vogel; Rosemarie Kother; Kornelia Ender	4:16.844	WR
2nd place, silver medalist(s)	-	United States	Melissa Belote; Marcia Morey; Deena Deardurff; Shirley Babashoff	4:25.804	
3rd place, bronze medalist(s)	-	West Germany	Angelika Grieser; Petra Nows; Gudrun Beckmann; Jutta Weber	4:26.576	
4	-	Netherlands	Enith Brigitha; Alie te Riet; A. Segaar; Veronica Stel	4:28.860	
5	-	Canada	Wendy Cook; Mary Stewart; Patti Stenhouse; Gail Amundrud	4:29.608	
6	-	Sweden	Diana Olsson; Britt-Marie Smedh; Gunilla Andersson; Eva Andersson	4:30.596	
7	-	Soviet Union	I. Golovanova; Lyubov Rusanova; Aleksandra Meerzon; L. Kobsova	4:33.385	
8	-	Australia	Linda Young; Beverley Whitfield; Debra Cain; Suzy Anderson	4:34.457	
