= Heather Coombridge =

New Zealand swimmer

Personal information
- Nationality: New Zealand
- Born: 24 April 1953 (age 73) Hamilton, New Zealand

Sport
- Sport: Swimming
- Strokes: Freestyle
- Coach: Duncan Laing

Heather Coombridge (born 24 April 1953) is a New Zealand swimmer. She competed in two events at the 1972 Summer Olympics.

Competing at the 1972 Summer Olympics in Munich, Coombridge finished 7th in the third heat of the 100 metre freestyle in a time of 1:02.95 and 5th in the first heat of the 200 metre freestyle in a time of 2:14.78.

She was coached by Duncan Laing.
