= Peichev =

Peichev or Peychev (Bulgarian: Пейчев); feminine: Peicheva, Peycheva is a Bulgarian patronymic surname derived from the given name Peicho. Notable people with the surname include:

- Gergana Peycheva (born 2003), Bulgarian chess master
- Ivan Peychev (1916–1976), Bulgarian poet and playwright
- Khriska Peycheva (born 1955), Bulgarian former swimmer
- Lozanka Peycheva Bulgarian folklorist and musicologist, professor
- Peycho Peychev (born 1913), Bulgarian general and politician
- Rositsa Peycheva (born 973) Bulgarian folk and pop-folk singer
- Simona Peycheva (born 1985), Bulgarian rhythmic gymnast
- Stefan Peychev (1897–1976), Bulgarian sculptor
- Vera Jürgens (née Peicheva, 1969), also known as Vera Peicheva-Jürgens, Bulgarian and German female chess player
