= Judith Sirs =

British swimmer

Personal information
- Born: 6 March 1954 (age 72) Hartlepool, England

Sport
- Sport: Swimming

Judith Sirs (born 6 March 1954) is a British former swimmer. She competed in the women's 4 × 100 metre freestyle relay at the 1972 Summer Olympics.
