= Gisela Cerezo =

Venezuelan swimmer (born 1956)

Personal information
- Born: 5 April 1956 (age 70)

Sport
- Sport: Swimming
Medal record
Representing Venezuela
Central American and Caribbean Games
Gold medal – first place	1974 Santo Domingo	200m individual medley
Gold medal – first place	1974 Santo Domingo	400m individual medley

Gisela Cerezo (born 5 April 1956) is a Venezuelan former swimmer. She competed in two events at the 1972 Summer Olympics.
