= Angelika Grieser =

German swimmer

Personal information
- Born: 14 July 1959 (age 67) Schwäbisch Gmünd, West Germany

Sport
- Sport: Swimming
- Strokes: Backstroke
Medal record
Women's swimming
Representing West Germany
World Championships
Bronze medal – third place	1973 Belgrade	4×100 m medley
European Championships
Silver medal – second place	1974 Vienna	4×100 m medley

Angelika Grieser (born 14 July 1959) is a German former swimmer. She competed in three events at the 1976 Summer Olympics.
