= Lynn Skrifvars =

American swimmer

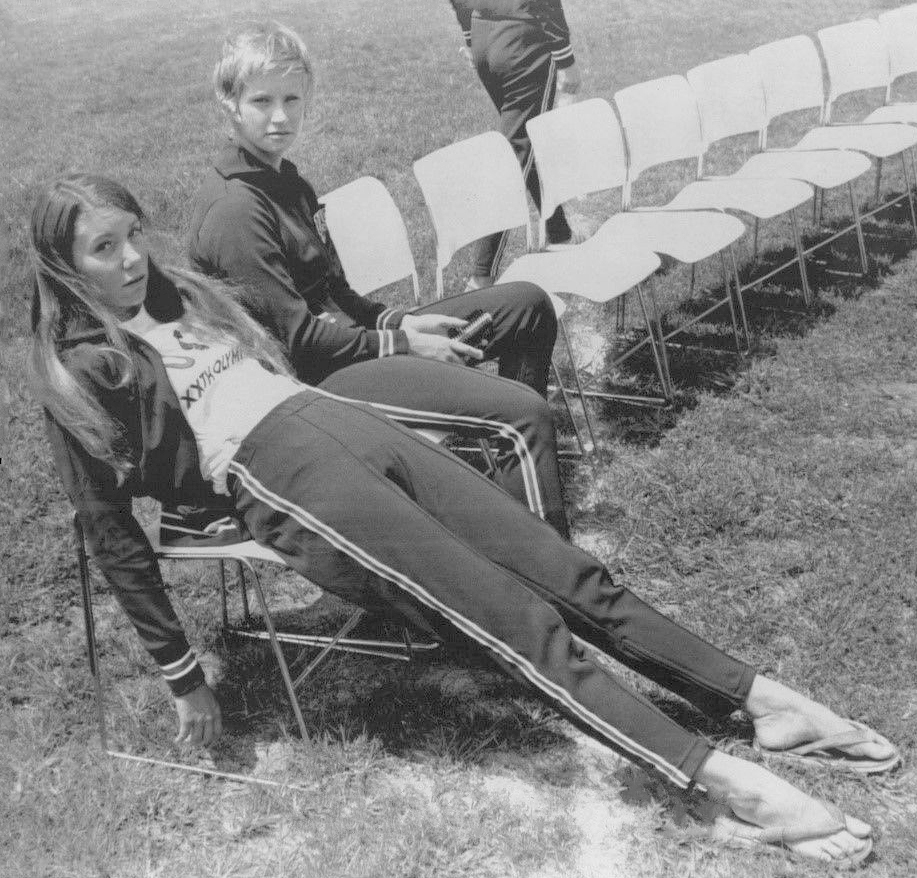
- Skrifvars (left) at the 1972 Olympics

Personal information
- Full name: Lynn Ellen Skrifvars
- National team: United States
- Born: February 8, 1951 (age 75) Lynwood, California, U.S.
- Height: 5 ft 8 in (1.73 m)
- Weight: 130 lb (59 kg)

Sport
- Sport: Swimming
- Strokes: Backstroke, freestyle
- Club: Phillips 66
Medal record
Representing the United States
Pan American Games
| Gold medal – first place | 1971 Cali | 4×100 m freestyle |
Summer Universiade
| Silver medal – second place | 1970 Turin | 100 m backstroke |

Lynn Ellen Skrifvars (born February 8, 1951), also known by her married name Lynn Nelson, is an American former competition swimmer who won a gold medal in the 4 × 100 m freestyle at the 1971 Pan American Games. Next year she swam for the gold medal-winning U.S. 4 × 100 m team at the 1972 Olympics, but did not receive a medal because she did not swim in the final. Individually, she competed in the preliminary heats of the 200-meter backstroke.

Skrifvars earned a degree in physical therapy from the California State University, Long Beach and later worked as a physiotherapist. She also competed in masters swimming events.
