= Grethe Mathiesen =

Norwegian swimmer

Personal information
- Born: 10 April 1956 (age 70) Kirkenes, Norway

Sport
- Country: Norway
- Sport: Swimming

Grethe Mathiesen (born 10 April 1956) is a Norwegian swimmer. She was born in Kirkenes. She competed at the 1972 Summer Olympics in Munich, in the women's 100 metre freestyle.

She won five national titles and two Nordic titles in 100 metre freestyle.
