= Christine Petit (swimmer) =

French freestyle swimmer (born 1955)

Personal information
- Born: 28 January 1955 (age 71)

Sport
- Sport: Swimming

Christine Petit (born 28 January 1955) is a French former freestyle swimmer. She competed in the women's 4 × 100 metre freestyle relay at the 1972 Summer Olympics and 1970 European Aquatics Championships.
