= Christiane Flamand =

Swiss swimmer

Personal information
- Born: 8 May 1955 (age 71)

Sport
- Sport: Swimming

Christiane Flamand (born 8 May 1955) is a Swiss former swimmer. She competed in the women's 4 × 100 metre freestyle relay at the 1972 Summer Olympics.
