= Yelena Timoshenko =

Russian swimmer

Personal information
- Born: 6 October 1955 (age 70)

Sport
- Sport: Swimming

Yelena Timoshenko (born 6 October 1955) is a Russian former freestyle swimmer. She competed in three events at the 1972 Summer Olympics for the Soviet Union.
