= Sylvia Eichner =

German swimmer

Personal information
- Born: 6 June 1957 (age 69) Dresden, East Germany
- Height: 1.67 m (5 ft 6 in)
- Weight: 61 kg (134 lb)

Sport
- Sport: Swimming
- Club: SC Einheit Dresden
Medal record
Representing East Germany
Olympic Games
Silver medal – second place	1972 Munich	4×100 m freestyle
World Championships
Gold medal – first place	1973 Belgrade	4×100 m freestyle

Sylvia Eichner (born 6 June 1957) is a former East German swimmer who won a silver medal in the 4 × 100 m freestyle relay at the 1972 Summer Olympics. She also won a gold medal in the same event at the 1973 World Aquatics Championships, setting a new world record.
