= Khriska Peycheva =

Bulgarian swimmer

Personal information
- Born: 2 January 1955 (age 71) Varna, Bulgaria

Sport
- Sport: Swimming

Khriska Peycheva (Bulgarian: Хриска Пейчева, born 2 January 1955) is a Bulgarian former swimmer. She competed in the women's 100 metre freestyle at the 1972 Summer Olympics.
