= Nadezhda Matyukhina =

Russian swimmer

Personal information
- Nationality: Russian
- Born: 19 February 1954 (age 72)

Sport
- Sport: Swimming
Medal record
Representing Soviet Union
Summer Universiade
Bronze medal – third place	1973 Moscow	400m freestyle

Nadezhda Matyukhina (born 19 February 1954) is a former Russian freestyle swimmer. She competed in three events at the 1972 Summer Olympics for the Soviet Union.
