= Virginia Anchestegui =

Mexican swimmer (born 1957)

Personal information
- Born: 29 March 1957 (age 69)

Sport
- Sport: Swimming

Virginia Anchestegui Rabasi (born 29 March 1957) is a Mexican former freestyle swimmer. She competed in two events at the 1972 Summer Olympics.
