= Margrit Thomet =

Swiss swimmer

Personal information
- Born: 19 June 1952
- Died: July 1990 (aged 38)

Sport
- Sport: Swimming

Margrit Thomet (19 June 1952 – July 1990) was a Swiss butterfly and freestyle swimmer. She competed in five events at the 1972 Summer Olympics.
