= Sharon Booth =

Australian swimmer

Personal information
- Born: 26 June 1956 (age 70)

Sport
- Sport: Swimming
- Strokes: freestyle

Sharon Booth (born 26 June 1956) is an Australian former swimmer. She competed in three events at the 1972 Summer Olympics.
