= Mary Beth Rondeau =

Canadian swimmer

Personal information
- Born: 19 December 1956 (age 69) Vancouver, British Columbia, Canada

Sport
- Sport: Swimming

Mary Beth Rondeau (born 19 December 1956) is a Canadian former freestyle swimmer. She competed in five events at the 1972 Summer Olympics.
