= Françoise Monod =

Swiss swimmer

Personal information
- Born: 20 April 1959 (age 67)

Sport
- Sport: Swimming

Françoise Monod (born 20 April 1959) is a Swiss former freestyle swimmer. She competed in five events at the 1972 Summer Olympics.
