= Leanne Francis =

Australian swimmer

Personal information
- Born: 9 January 1957 (age 69)

Sport
- Sport: Swimming

Leanne Francis (born 9 January 1957) is an Australian former swimmer. She competed in two events at the 1972 Summer Olympics.
