= Gudrun Beckmann =

German swimmer

Personal information
- Full name: Gudrun Beckmann
- Nationality: West German
- Born: August 17, 1955 (age 70) Düsseldorf, West Germany
- Height: 1.74 m (5 ft 9 in)
- Weight: 62 kg (137 lb)

Sport
- Sport: Swimming
- Strokes: Butterfly
Medal record
Women's swimming
Representing West Germany
Olympic Games
Bronze medal – third place	1972 Munich	4×100 m freestyle
Bronze medal – third place	1972 Munich	4×100 m medley
World Championships
Bronze medal – third place	1973 Belgrade	4×100 m freestyle
Bronze medal – third place	1973 Belgrade	4×100 m medley
Universiade
Silver medal – second place	1977 Sofia	100 m butterfly

Gudrun Beckmann (born 17 August 1955 in Düsseldorf) is a German former swimmer who competed in the 1972 Summer Olympics and in the 1976 Summer Olympics.
