= Laura Gorgerino =

Italian swimmer

Personal information
- Born: 31 March 1957 (age 69) Rome, Italy

Sport
- Sport: Swimming

Laura Gorgerino (born 31 March 1957) is an Italian former swimmer. She competed in the women's 4 × 100 metre freestyle relay at the 1972 Summer Olympics, with her team placing 7th.
