= Ileana Morales =

Venezuelan swimmer (born 1956)

Personal information
- Born: 27 November 1956 (age 69)

Sport
- Sport: Swimming

Ileana Morales (born 27 November 1956) is a Venezuelan former swimmer. She competed in five events at the 1972 Summer Olympics.
