= Federica Stabilini =

Italian swimmer

Personal information
- Born: 2 December 1957 (age 68) Rome, Italy

Sport
- Sport: Swimming

Federica Stabilini (born 2 December 1957) is an Italian former swimmer. She competed in three events at the 1972 Summer Olympics.
