= Irwi Johansson =

Swedish swimmer (born 1954)

Personal information
- Born: 12 July 1954 (age 72) Gothenburg, Sweden

Sport
- Sport: Swimming

Irwi Johansson (born 12 July 1954) is a Swedish former swimmer. She competed in the women's 4 × 100 metre freestyle relay at the 1972 Summer Olympics.
