= Patrizia Lanfredini =

Italian swimmer (born 1957)

Personal information
- Born: April 3, 1957 (age 69) Florence, Italy

Sport
- Sport: Swimming
Medal record
Representing Italy
Mediterranean Games
Gold medal – first place	1975 Algiers	4x100m freestyle relay

Patrizia Lanfredini (born 3 April 1957) is an Italian former freestyle swimmer who competed in the 1972 Summer Olympics.
