= Heidemarie Reineck =

German swimmer

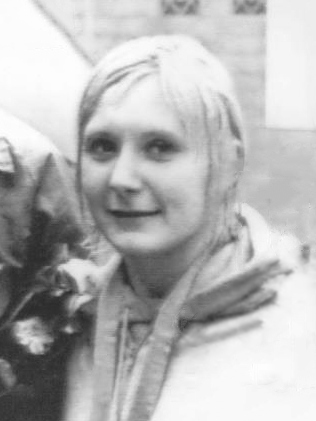
- Reineck at the 1973 Summer Universiade

Personal information
- Born: 15 February 1952 (age 74) West Berlin, West Germany
- Height: 1.64 m (5 ft 5 in)
- Weight: 58 kg (128 lb)

Sport
- Sport: Swimming
- Club: Schwimmverein Bayreuth
Medal record
Representing West Germany
Summer Olympics
Bronze medal – third place	1968 Mexico City	4×100 m medley
Bronze medal – third place	1972 Munich	4×100 m freestyle
Bronze medal – third place	1972 Munich	4v100 m medley
World Championships
Bronze medal – third place	1973 Belgrade	4×100 m freestyle
European Championships
Bronze medal – third place	1970 Barcelona	4×100 m medley
Summer Universiade
Bronze medal – third place	1973 Moscow	100 m freestyle

Heidemarie "Heidi" Reineck (born 15 February 1952) is a German former swimmer who won three bronze medals in relay events at the 1968 and 1972 Summer Olympics. Individually she finished fifth in the 100 m freestyle in 1972. She also won bronze medals in relay events at the 1970 European Aquatics Championships and 1973 World Aquatics Championships.

Nationally, she won seven titles in the 100 m (1968–1971), 200 m (1968, 1970) and 400 m (1968) freestyle events.
