= Laura Podestà =

Italian swimmer (1954–2022)

Personal information
- Born: 21 April 1954 Milan, Italy
- Died: 20 December 2022 (aged 68) Milan, Italy

Sport
- Sport: Swimming
Medal record
Representing Italy
Mediterranean Games
Gold medal – first place	1971 Izmir	4x100m freestyle relay

Laura Podestà (21 April 1954 – 20 December 2022) was an Italian swimmer. She competed in three events at the 1972 Summer Olympics.
