= Jenny Kemp =

American swimmer

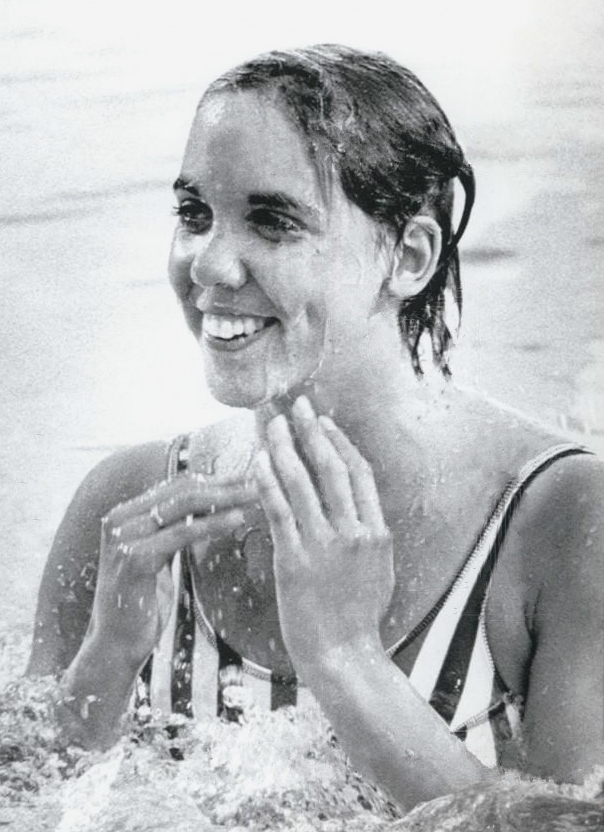
- Kemp in 1972

Personal information
- Full name: Jennifer Jo Kemp
- Nickname: "Jenny"
- National team: United States
- Born: May 28, 1955 (age 71) Cincinnati, Ohio, U.S.
- Height: 5 ft 9 in (1.75 m)
- Weight: 146 lb (66 kg)
- Spouse: John Segers Carey m. 1983

Sport
- Sport: Swimming
- Strokes: Backstroke, freestyle
- Club: Cincinnati Marlins
- College team: University of Cincinnati
- Coach: Paul Bergen (Marlins)
Medal record
Representing the United States
Olympic Games
Gold medal – first place	1972 Munich	4×100 m freestyle
Pan American Games
Bronze medal – third place	1975 Mexico City	100 m backstroke

Jennifer Jo Kemp (born May 28, 1955) is an American former competition swimmer, an Olympic champion in the 4x100-meter freestyle relay, and a former world record-holder.

Kemp was born on May 28, 1955 in Cincinnati to Betty and Cliff Kemp, who worked for Proctor and Gamble. By the time of her Olympic competition, she was one of five siblings, her twin brother was a High School All-American swimmer, and at least one other sibling had swum competitively. Kemp attended Regina High School in Norwood, graduating in June 1974, and did her training and competition as part of the Cincinnati Pepsi Marlins where she began swimming in 1964 at the age of 9. Prior to her Olympic Competition, she was coached by Paul Bergen, from 1968-1972 while swimming for the Pepsi Marlins. Jenny also participated in Water Polo with the Marlins, and in November of her Senior year competed in the Senior Women's National Indoor Water Polo Championships in Cincinnati.

She placed third in the 200-yard freestyle at the AAU Championships in Dallas in early April 1972, with a time of 1:53.58, second in the 100-yard freestyle with a time of 52.64 seconds, third in the 100 and fourth in the 200-yard backstroke.

== 1972 Olympic gold ==
As only a 17-year old High School Junior, Kemp attended the Olympic trials outside Chicago, and though an unknown, qualified for the American team after setting an American record of 58.63 in the 100-meter freestyle. Her swim was only .13 seconds off the Women's World Record for the event held by Shane Gould of Australia. Gould would also attend the 1972 Munich Olympics and capture three gold freestyle medals.

At the 1972 Olympics Kemp won a gold medal in the 4×100-meter freestyle relay, helping to set a world record combined time of 3:55.9. Swimming in second position, Jenny swam a 58.99, slightly faster than one of the other relay swimmers, and on pace with the opening swimmer, Sandra Neilson. The anchor leg for the relay was swum by Shirley Babashoff who had only a slight lead at the beginning of her 100-meter swim against the last East German swimmer Kornelia Ender. Ender took the lead, but in a close race, Babashoff passed Ender near the end of the race, edging her out by only .36 seconds. The close win was particularly gratifying for American spectators in the large Olympic crowd of 10,000. Kemp reached the semifinals of the individual 100-meter freestyle event, where she finished in ninth place with a time of 59.93, but her swim was somewhat disappointing considering her time in the trials was 58.63 seconds, 1.6 seconds faster, making it close to a world record.

Kemp initially specialized in the backstroke before changing to freestyle in 1971. Next year she won the 100 m AAU title.

Continuing to compete after the Olympics, in the Midwest Swimming and Diving Championships in Chicago on March 1, 1974, Kemp took a first in the 200-yard individual medley in 2:16.7, and a first in the 50-yard backstroke with a time of 25.5 seconds.

== University of Cincinnati ==
Two years after winning her Olympic medal, she attended the University of Cincinnati, beginning in the Fall of 1974 and swam for the team around two years. As a Freshman in February 1974, at the Ohio College Swimming and Diving Championships, she swam the lead-off backstroke leg as part of the winning 200-yard medley relay team who had a combined time of 1:58.1, and then went back-to-back winning the 200-yard IM in 2:18.3, and the 50-yard backstroke in 29.3. In February 1975, she ceased swimming with the University of Cincinnati team and swam exclusively with the Pepsi Marlins in hopes of an Olympic birth and to focus on training for the April 1975 AAU Nationals where she had qualified in the 200-yard individual medley. She swam in around half the University of Cincinnati meets in her Freshman year. In addition to her Olympic gold medal, Jenny was a 1975 Mexico City Pan American Games bronze medalist in the 100-meter backstroke. Feeling somewhat redeemed from the off performance she had in her 100-meter Olympic swim where she placed ninth, Kemp remarked to the press, "That was the one I really loved because I did it the right way." Kemp noted that three years after the Olympics, with additional experience in international competition and college, she had a better feel for nutrition, and how to prepare mentally for a challenging international meet.

== Elite-level swimming retirement ==
She continued to sporadically represent the Cincinnati Marlins through at least February 1976, taking a second at the Marlins' International Invitational Swim Meet in the 100-yard backstroke. By 1976, her coach at the Marlins was 1968 triple Olympic gold medalist Charlie Hickcox. Jenny retired from high level swimming competition around June 1976, after competing with a U.S. team in a meet in Germany, and did not attend the 1976 Olympic trials. She married John Segers Carey on April 23, 1983 at all Saint's Church in Cincinnati.

In 1990 at the age of 35, as Jenny Kemp Carey, she had two children, swam competitively with United States Master's Swimming and competed at a high level in Triathlon with Team Schwinn of Cincinnati. She was still swimming three to four times a week at the Finneytown, Ohio's YMCA, and at an Indianapolis U.S. Master's meet in age-group competition, finished fourth highest in the nation in her signature 100 and 200-meter events. Kemp worked as a secretary for several Cincinnati-area businesses and in 1994, worked for a Cincinnati area swimwear firm.

== Honors ==
Kemp was inducted into the University of Cincinnati James P. Kelly Athletics Hall Of Fame in 2009.

== See also ==
- Swimming at the 1972 Summer Olympics – Women's 4 × 100 metre freestyle relay
- List of Olympic medalists in swimming (women)
- World record progression 4 × 100 metres freestyle relay
