= Sandy Neilson =

American swimmer (born 1956)

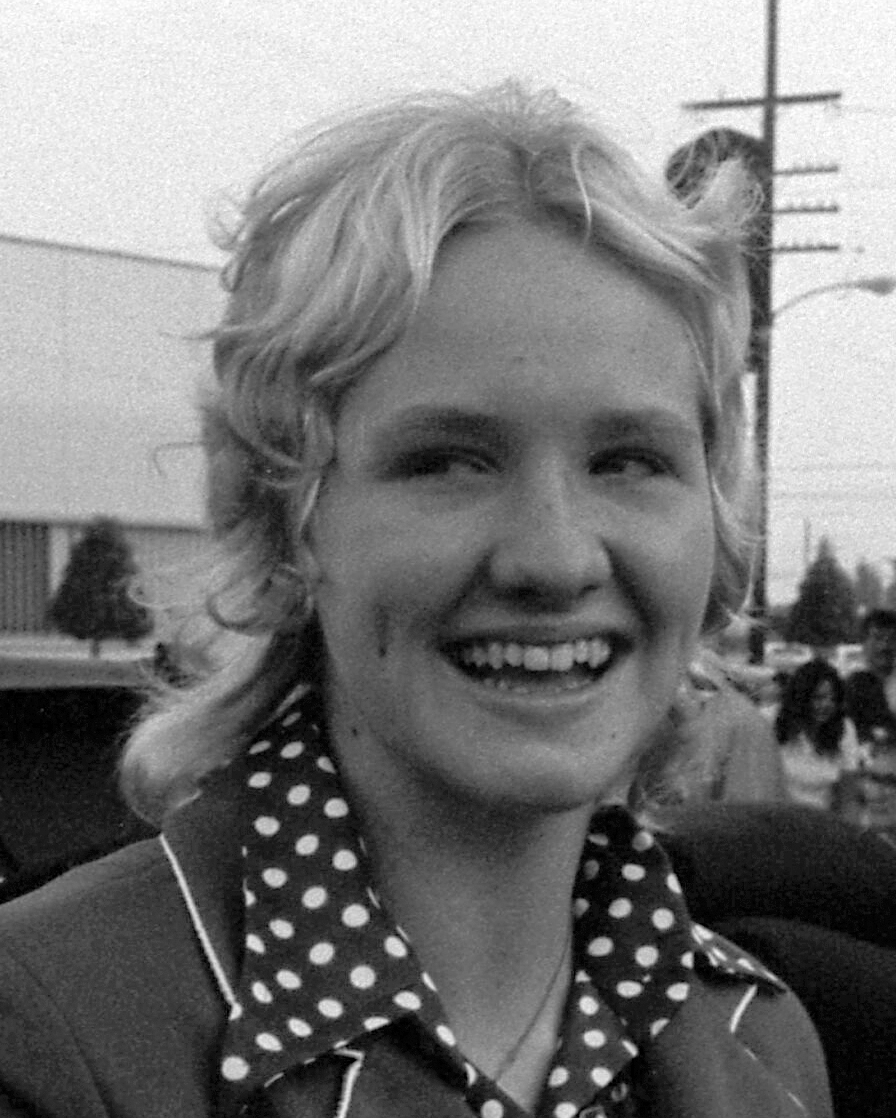
- Neilson in 1972

Personal information
- Full name: Sandra Lynn Neilson
- Nickname: "Sandy"
- National team: United States
- Born: March 20, 1956 (age 70) Burbank, California, U.S.
- Height: 5 ft 8 in (173 cm)
- Weight: 139 lb (63 kg)

Sport
- Sport: Swimming
- Strokes: Freestyle
- Club: El Monte Aquatic Club
- College team: University of California, Santa Barbara
Medal record
Women's swimming
Representing the United States
Event	1st	2nd	3rd
Olympic Games	3	0	0
Pan American Games	2	1	0
Total	5	1	0
Olympic Games
Gold medal – first place	1972 Munich	100 m freestyle
Gold medal – first place	1972 Munich	4×100 m freestyle
Gold medal – first place	1972 Munich	4×100 m medley
Pan American Games
Gold medal – first place	1971 Cali	100 m freestyle
Gold medal – first place	1971 Cali	4×100 m freestyle
Silver medal – second place	1971 Cali	4×100 m medley

Sandra Lynn Neilson (born March 20, 1956), also known by her married name Sandy Bell, is an American former competition swimmer, three-time Olympic gold medalist, and former world record-holder.

== Amateur career ==
Neilson won her only Amateur Athletic Union (AAU) national championship in 1971 in the 100-yard freestyle. While a student at El Monte High School, Neilson set CIF Southern Section records in 1972 for both the 50-yard and 100-yard freestyle events. She later attended University of California, Santa Barbara, where she was a member of the UCSB Gauchos swim team and a three-time All-American. In 1977, she won both the Association for Intercollegiate Athletics for Women (AIAW) 50-yard and 100-yard freestyle national championships.

== 1972 Summer Olympics ==
Despite being ranked as the third-best American swimmer, Neilson participated in the 1972 Summer Olympics in Munich, Germany at the age of 16. In the 100-meter freestyle, Neilson defeated heavy favorites Shane Gould from Australia and her American teammate Shirley Babashoff in an Olympic record time of 58.59 seconds. The victory landed her a spot on the 4×100-meter freestyle relay with Babashoff as well as the 4×100-meter medley relay. Both of Neilson's relay teams won gold medals in world record times.

In a twist of fate, during the Munich massacre which took place the day after the swimming events were completed, both Gould and Babashoff were huddled with Neilson in her Olympic Village while the massacre was taking place. Neilson recalled, "When we found out about the terrorists, I called my parents and told them I loved them. I thought I might never see them again."

== Post-Olympic life ==
Neilson met her current coach and husband, Dr. Keith Bell, a Texas sports psychologist, in 1984. Bell successfully argued in August 1984 to the International Swimming Hall of Fame that Neilson had been "retired" for nine years, despite still participating in U.S. Masters Swimming. This made her eligible under the ISHOF's four-year retirement requirements and Neilson was inducted into the Hall of Fame in 1986.

Neilson participated in the 1988 and 1992 U.S. Olympic Trials. She missed qualifying for the 1996 Trials in the 50-meter freestyle by a mere nine one-hundredths (0.09) of a second.

In 1996, Neilson was the first swimmer over 40 to be ranked top 25 in the world in an event (50-meter freestyle) and the first swimmer over 40 to compete in the U.S. National Championships, at which she was honored by having USA Swimming's comeback award named after her, the "Sandy Neilson-Bell Comeback Swimmer of the Year Award".

== See also ==
- List of multiple Olympic gold medalists
- List of Olympic medalists in swimming (women)
- World record progression 4 × 100 metres freestyle relay
- World record progression 4 × 100 metres medley relay
