= Tatyana Zolotnitskaya =

Russian freestyle swimmer (born 1955)

Personal information
- Born: 1 January 1955 (age 71) Novosibirsk, Russian SFSR, Soviet Union
- Height: 1.72 m (5 ft 8 in)
- Weight: 65 kg (143 lb)

Sport
- Sport: Swimming
- Club: Dynamo Novosibirsk
Medal record
Women's swimming
Representing the Soviet Union
European Championships
Silver medal – second place	1970 Barcelona	4×100 m medley

Tatyana Vladimirovna Zolotnitskaya (Russian: Татьяна Владимировна Золотницкая; born 1 January 1955) is a Russian freestyle swimmer. She competed at the 1972 Summer Olympics in four events: 100 m, 200 m and 4 × 100 m freestyle and 4 × 100 m medley and finished fourth in the 4 × 100 m medley relay. She won a silver medal in the same event at the 1970 European Aquatics Championships. Between 1969 and 1974 she collected seven national titles and set 14 national records in the 100 m, 200m, 400 m and 4 × 100 m freestyle events.

Zolotnitskaya was born in Novosibirsk in 1955 and in 1964 started swimming in a club. In 1969, she dislocated her neck as a result of a prank at a training. Being a young and healthy girl she had not realized the seriousness of the injury and had not had it operated. However, it later resulted in sudden neck pains that followed her through entire career. In 1975, after winning another national title she retired from competitive swimming. While studying at a university to become a coach, she once suddenly got pain in the joints that paralyzed her. She was successfully operated, but nevertheless became partly disabled for life, and could resume normal activities only after four years. In 1996, she began teaching swimming to physically handicapped children. The next year she started competing herself among disabled athletes.
