= Andrea Eife =

German swimmer

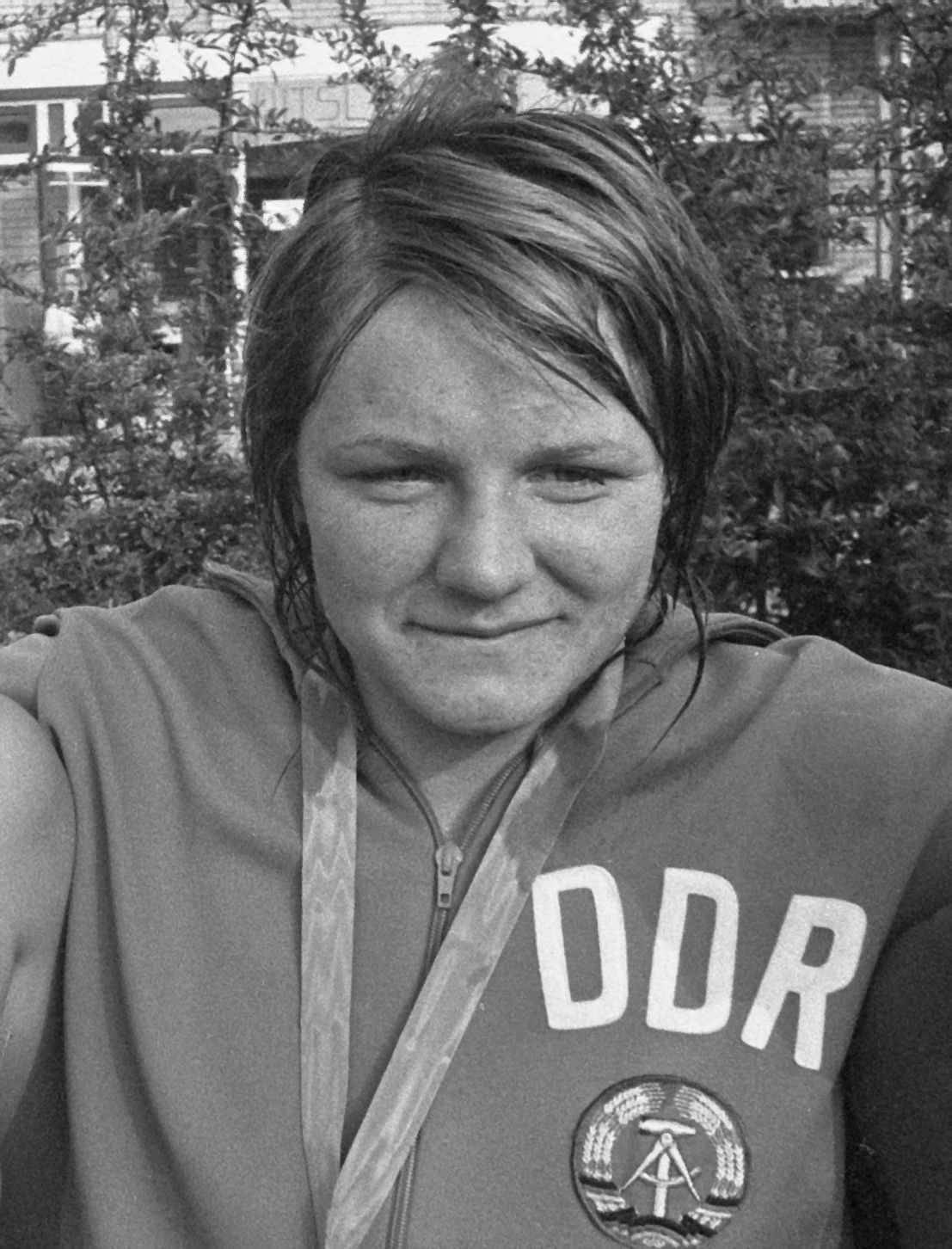
- Andrea Eife in 1973

Medal record

Women's swimming

Representing East Germany
Silver medal – second place	1972 Munich	4×100 m freestyle

World Championships
Gold medal – first place	1973 Belgrade	4×100 m freestyle
Bronze medal – third place	1973 Belgrade	200 m freestyle

European Championships
Gold medal – first place	1974 Vienna	4×100 m freestyle
Bronze medal – third place	1974 Vienna	200 m freestyle

Andrea Eife (later Gemsleben, born 12 April 1956 in Leipzig) is a German former swimmer who competed in the 1972 Summer Olympics. She won a silver medal in the 4 × 100 m freestyle relay and finished fifth and sixth in the individual 200 m and 100 m freestyle events, respectively. At the 1973 World Aquatics Championships, she won a bronze medal in the 200 m freestyle and a gold medal in the 4 × 100 m freestyle relay, breaking the world record. The next year, she repeated these medal achievements at the 1974 European Aquatics Championships.
