= Angela Steinbach =

German former swimmer (born 1955)

Personal information
- Born: March 31, 1955 (age 71) Kleve, West Germany

Sport
- Sport: Swimming
Medal record
Representing West Germany
Olympic Games
Bronze medal – third place	1972 Munich	4×100 m freestyle
World Championships
Bronze medal – third place	1973 Belgrade	4×100 m freestyle

Angela Steinbach (born 31 March 1955) is a German former swimmer who competed in the 1972 Summer Olympics.
