= Eva Andersson (swimmer) =

Swedish swimmer (born 1957)

Personal information
- Born: 30 June 1957 Uddevalla, Sweden
- Height: 1.67 m (5 ft 6 in)
- Weight: 63 kg (139 lb)

Sport
- Sport: Swimming
- Club: GKKN, Göteborg
Medal record
Women's swimming
Representing Sweden
European Championships
Bronze medal – third place	Barcelona	4×100 m freestyle

Eva Maria "Tjorven" Andersson (born 30 June 1957) is a retired Swedish swimmer who won a bronze medal in the 4 × 100 m freestyle relay at the 1970 European Aquatics Championships. She finished sixth in the same event at the 1972 Summer Olympics.
