= Magdolna Patóh =

Hungarian swimmer (born 1948)

Personal information
- Born: 12 May 1948 (age 78) Fiľakovo, Czechoslovakia
- Height: 1.74 m (5 ft 9 in)
- Weight: 61 kg (134 lb)

Sport
- Sport: Swimming
- Club: Budapesti Spartacus SC
Medal record
Representing Hungary
European Championships
Silver medal – second place	1970 Barcelona	4×100 m freestyle

Magdolna Patóh (born 12 May 1948) is a retired Hungarian freestyle swimmer who won a silver medal in the 4 × 100 m freestyle relay at the 1970 European Aquatics Championships. She competed in five events at the 1968 and 1972 Summer Olympics. Her best achievements were in the 4 × 100 m freestyle relay, where her team finished fifth and fourth in 1968 and 1972, respectively.

She graduated from a college of finance and accountancy. After retiring from senior swimming she competed in the masters category.
