= Elke Sehmisch =

German former swimmer (born 1955)

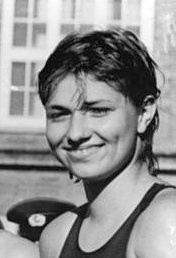
- Elke Sehmisch in 1971

Personal information
- Born: 4 May 1955 (age 71) Leipzig, East Germany
- Height: 1.67 m (5 ft 6 in)
- Weight: 52 kg (115 lb)

Sport
- Sport: Swimming
- Club: SC DHfK
Medal record
Representing East Germany
Olympic Games
Silver medal – second place	1972 Munich	4×100 m freestyle
European Championships
Gold medal – first place	1970 Barcelona	100 m freestyle
Gold medal – first place	1970 Barcelona	4×100 m freestyle

Elke Sehmisch (born 4 May 1955) is a German former swimmer. She won a silver medal in the 4 × 100 m freestyle relay at the 1972 Summer Olympics, as well as two gold medals in the 100 m and 4 × 100 m freestyle events at the 1970 European Aquatics Championships.
