= Jutta Weber =

German swimmer (born 1954)

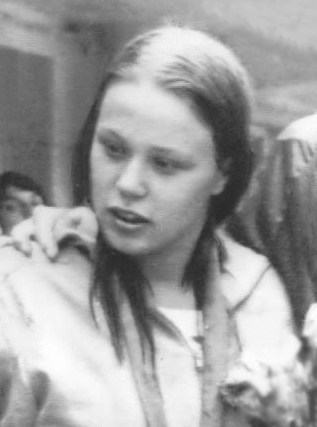
- Weber at the 1973 Summer Universiade

Personal information
- Born: 28 June 1954 (age 72) Hamm, West Germany
- Height: 1.69 m (5 ft 7 in)
- Weight: 55 kg (121 lb)

Sport
- Sport: Swimming
- Club: Wasserfreunde Wuppertal
Medal record
Representing West Germany
Summer Olympics
Bronze medal – third place	1972 Munich	4×100 m freestyle
Bronze medal – third place	1972 Munich	4×100 m medley
World Championships
Bronze medal – third place	1973 Belgrade	4×100 m freestyle
Bronze medal – third place	1973 Belgrade	4×100 m medley
European Championships
Silver medal – second place	1974 Vienna	4×100 m medley
Summer Universiade
Gold medal – first place	1977 Sofia	100 m freestyle
Silver medal – second place	1973 Moscow	100 m freestyle

Judith "Jutta" Weber (later Meeuw, born 28 June 1954) is a German former swimmer who competed in the 1972 and 1976 Summer Olympics, and won bronze medals in the 4 × 100 m freestyle and 4 × 100 m medley relay events in 1972. She repeated this achievement next year at the 1973 World Aquatics Championships. In 1974, she won a European silver medal in the 4 × 100 m medley.

Individually, she became national champion in the 100 m (1972, 1973, 1975–1977) and 200 m freestyle (1972, 1973, 1975, 1976). The FRG 1976 Olympic team for the 200 m freestyle included Regina Nissen, Marion Platten and Weber.

Her husband, Folkert Meeuw, competed for West Germany in swimming at the 1968 and 1972 Olympics and won a silver medal in 1972. Her son, Helge Meeuw, also competed in swimming, for unified Germany, in the 2004, 2008 and 2012 Olympics, and won a silver medal in 2012.
