= Edit Kovács (swimmer) =

Hungarian swimmer

Personal information
- Born: 15 July 1951 (age 74) Budapest, Hungary
- Height: 1.64 m (5 ft 5 in)
- Weight: 54 kg (119 lb)

Sport
- Sport: Swimming
- Club: BVSC, Budapest
Medal record
Representing Hungary
European Championships
Silver medal – second place	1970 Barcelona	4×100 m freestyle

Edit Kovács (born 15 July 1951) is a retired Hungarian swimmer who won a silver medal in the 4 × 100 m freestyle relay at the 1970 European Aquatics Championships. She competed in five events at the 1968 and 1972 Summer Olympics. Her best achievements were in the 4 × 100 m freestyle relay, where her team finished fifth and fourth in 1968 and 1972, respectively.
