= Chantal Schertz =

French swimmer

Personal information
- Born: 18 July 1958 (age 67)
- Height: 1.70 m (5 ft 7 in)
- Weight: 61 kg (134 lb)

Sport
- Sport: Swimming
- Club: S Poitiers
Medal record
Representing France
European Championships
Bronze medal – third place	1974 Vienna	4×100 m freestyle

Chantal Schertz (born 18 July 1958) is a retired French swimmer who won a bronze medal in the 4 × 100 m freestyle relay at the 1974 European Aquatics Championships. She competed in the same event at the 1972 and 1976 Summer Olympics and finished sixth in 1976.
