= Swimming at the 1972 Summer Olympics =

Swimming at the Games of the XX Olympiad
- Swimming pictogram
- Venue: Olympia Schwimmhalle
- Dates: 28 August – 4 September 1972
- No. of events: 29
- Competitors: 532 from 52 nations

The 1972 Summer Olympics were held in Munich, West Germany. 29 events in swimming were contested. There were a total of 532 participants from 52 countries competing.

Perhaps the most spectacular athletic events were in swimming. Mark Spitz had a remarkable run, competing in seven events, winning seven Olympic titles and setting seven world records. In 2008, Michael Phelps matched Spitz's feat of setting seven world records in a single Olympics. According to the official Olympic website, "He took part in the 4 × 200 m one hour after his final in the 100 m butterfly. As for the 200 m freestyle gold, it was his third medal in three days".

On the women's side of the competition, Shane Gould of Australia won five medals. She won the 200 m and 400 m freestyle as well as the 200 m individual medley, each with a new world-record time. In addition, she won the silver and the bronze in the 800 m and 100 m freestyle, respectively. In 2022, Gould remains the only woman in history to have claimed five medals in solo events in swimming at a single Olympic Games. Another 15-years-old, American Sandy Neilson, won three gold medals.

The Olympic record was broken at least once in all 29 events. In 20 of those events, a new world record was set.

== Events ==
The following events were contested (all pool events were long course, and distances are in metres unless otherwise stated):

- Freestyle: 100 m, 200 m, 400 m, 800 m (women), 1500 m (men)
- Backstroke: 100 m, 200 m
- Breaststroke: 100 m, 200 m
- Butterfly: 100 m, 200 m
- Individual Medley: 200 m, 400 m
- Relays: 4 × 100 m free, 4 × 200 m free (men); 4 × 100 m medley

== Participating nations ==
532 swimmers from 52 nations competed.

- Argentina (4)
- Australia (24)
- Austria (2)
- Belgium (4)
- Brazil (12)
- Bulgaria (3)
- Cambodia (4)
- Canada (38)
- Chinese Taipei (3)
- Colombia (4)
- Czechoslovakia (3)
- Denmark (6)
- East Germany (37)
- Ecuador (1)
- Egypt (2)
- El Salvador (7)
- Finland (1)
- France (18)
- Great Britain (36)
- Greece (5)
- Hong Kong (2)
- Hungary (16)
- Iceland (4)
- Ireland (7)
- Israel (1)
- Italy (24)
- Jamaica (1)
- Japan (15)
- Kuwait (2)
- Lebanon (2)
- Malaysia (2)
- Mexico (22)
- Netherlands (19)
- New Zealand (6)
- Norway (4)
- Peru (3)
- Philippines (7)
- Poland (5)
- Romania (3)
- Singapore (3)
- South Korea (1)
- Soviet Union (26)
- Spain (9)
- Sweden (15)
- Switzerland (10)
- Trinidad and Tobago (1)
- Turkey (2)
- United States (51)
- Uruguay (2)
- Venezuela (4)
- West Germany (44)
- Yugoslavia (5)

== Medal table ==
Rank	Nation	Gold	Silver	Bronze	Total
1	United States	17	14	12	43
2	Australia	6	2	2	10
3	East Germany	2	5	2	9
4	Japan	2	0	1	3
5	Sweden	2	0	0	2
6	Soviet Union	0	2	3	5
7	Canada	0	2	2	4
8	West Germany	0	1	3	4
9	Hungary	0	1	2	3
9	Italy	0	1	2	3
11	Great Britain	0	1	0	1
Totals (11 entries)		29	29	29	87

== Results ==
=== Men's events ===
Games	Gold		Silver		Bronze	
100 m freestyle	Mark Spitz; United States	51.22 (WR)	Jerry Heidenreich; United States	51.65	Vladimir Bure; Soviet Union	51.77
200 m freestyle	Mark Spitz; United States	1:52.78 (WR)	Steve Genter; United States	1:53.73	Werner Lampe; West Germany	1:53.99
400 m freestyle	Brad Cooper; Australia	4:00.27 (OR)	Steve Genter; United States	4:01.94	Tom McBreen; United States	4:02.64
1500 m freestyle	Mike Burton; United States	15:52.58 (WR)	Graham Windeatt; Australia	15:58.48	Doug Northway; United States	16:09.25
100 m backstroke	Roland Matthes; East Germany	56.58 (OR)	Mike Stamm; United States	57.70	John Murphy; United States	58.35
200 m backstroke	Roland Matthes; East Germany	2:02.82 (WR)	Mike Stamm; United States	2:04.09	Mitch Ivey; United States	2:04.33
100 m breaststroke	Nobutaka Taguchi; Japan	1:04.94 (WR)	Tom Bruce; United States	1:05.43	John Hencken; United States	1:05.61
200 m breaststroke	John Hencken; United States	2:21.55 (WR)	David Wilkie; Great Britain	2:23.67	Nobutaka Taguchi; Japan	2:23.88
100 m butterfly	Mark Spitz; United States	54.27 (WR)	Bruce Robertson; Canada	55.56	Jerry Heidenreich; United States	55.74
200 m butterfly	Mark Spitz; United States	2:00.70 (WR)	Gary Hall, Sr. United States	2:02.86	Robin Backhaus; United States	2:03.23
200 m individual medley	Gunnar Larsson; Sweden	2:07.17 (WR)	Tim McKee; United States	2:08.37	Steve Furniss; United States	2:08.45
400 m individual medley	Gunnar Larsson; Sweden	4:31.98 (OR)	Tim McKee; United States	4:31.98 (OR)	András Hargitay; Hungary	4:32.70
4 × 100 m freestyle relay	United States; David Edgar; John Murphy; Jerry Heidenreich; Mark Spitz	3:26.42 (WR)	Soviet Union; Vladimir Bure; Viktor Mazanov; Viktor Aboimov; Igor Grivennikov	3:29.72	East Germany; Roland Matthes; Wilfried Hartung; Peter Bruch; Lutz Unger	3:32.42
4 × 200 m freestyle relay	United States; John Kinsella; Fred Tyler; Steve Genter; Mark Spitz	7:35.78 (WR)	West Germany; Klaus Steinbach; Werner Lampe; Hans Vosseler; Hans Fassnacht	7:41.69	Soviet Union; Igor Grivennikov; Viktor Mazanov; Georgi Kulikov; Vladimir Bure	7:45.76
4 × 100 m medley relay	United States; Mike Stamm; Tom Bruce; Mark Spitz; Jerry Heidenreich	3:48.16 (WR)	East Germany; Roland Matthes; Klaus Katzur; Hartmut Flöckner; Lutz Unger	3:52.26	Canada; Erik Fish; William Mahony; Bruce Robertson; Robert Kasting	3:53.26

=== Women's events ===
Games	Gold		Silver		Bronze	
100 m freestyle	Sandy Neilson; United States	58.59 (OR)	Shirley Babashoff; United States	59.02	Shane Gould; Australia	59.06
200 m freestyle	Shane Gould; Australia	2:03.56 (WR)	Shirley Babashoff; United States	2:04.33	Keena Rothhammer; United States	2:04.92
400 m freestyle	Shane Gould; Australia	4:19.04 (WR)	Novella Calligaris; Italy	4:22.44	Gudrun Wegner; East Germany	4:23.11
800 m freestyle	Keena Rothhammer; United States	8:53.68 (WR)	Shane Gould; Australia	8:56.39	Novella Calligaris; Italy	8:57.46
100 m backstroke	Melissa Belote; United States	1:05.78 (OR)	Andrea Gyarmati; Hungary	1:06.26	Susie Atwood; United States	1:06.34
200 m backstroke	Melissa Belote; United States	2:19.19 (WR)	Susie Atwood; United States	2:20.38	Donna Gurr; Canada	2:23.22
100 m breaststroke	Cathy Carr; United States	1:13.58 (WR)	Galina Prozumenshchikova; Soviet Union	1:14.99	Beverley Whitfield; Australia	1:15.73
200 m breaststroke	Beverley Whitfield; Australia	2:41.05 (OR)	Dana Schoenfield; United States	2:42.05	Galina Prozumenshchikova; Soviet Union	2:42.36
100 m butterfly	Mayumi Aoki; Japan	1:03.34 (WR)	Roswitha Beier; East Germany	1:03.61	Andrea Gyarmati; Hungary	1:03.73
200 m butterfly	Karen Moe; United States	2:15.57 (WR)	Lynn Colella; United States	2:16.34	Ellie Daniel; United States	2:16.74
200 m individual medley	Shane Gould; Australia	2:23.07 (WR)	Kornelia Ender; East Germany	2:23.59	Lynn Vidali; United States	2:24.06
400 m individual medley	Gail Neall; Australia	5:02.97 (WR)	Leslie Cliff; Canada	5:03.57	Novella Calligaris; Italy	5:03.99
4 × 100 m freestyle relay	United States; Shirley Babashoff; Jane Barkman; Jenny Kemp; Sandy Neilson	3:55.19 (WR)	East Germany; Andrea Eife; Kornelia Ender; Elke Sehmisch; Gabriele Wetzko	3:55.55	West Germany; Gudrun Beckmann; Heidemarie Reineck; Angela Steinbach; Jutta Weber	3:57.93
4 × 100 m medley relay	United States; Melissa Belote; Cathy Carr; Deena Deardurff; Sandy Neilson	4:20.75 (WR)	East Germany; Christine Herbst; Renate Vogel; Roswitha Beier; Kornelia Ender	4:24.91	West Germany; Gudrun Beckmann; Vreni Eberle; Silke Pielen; Heidemarie Reineck	4:26.46

== Gallery of the medalists ==
Some of the Olympic medalists in Munich:

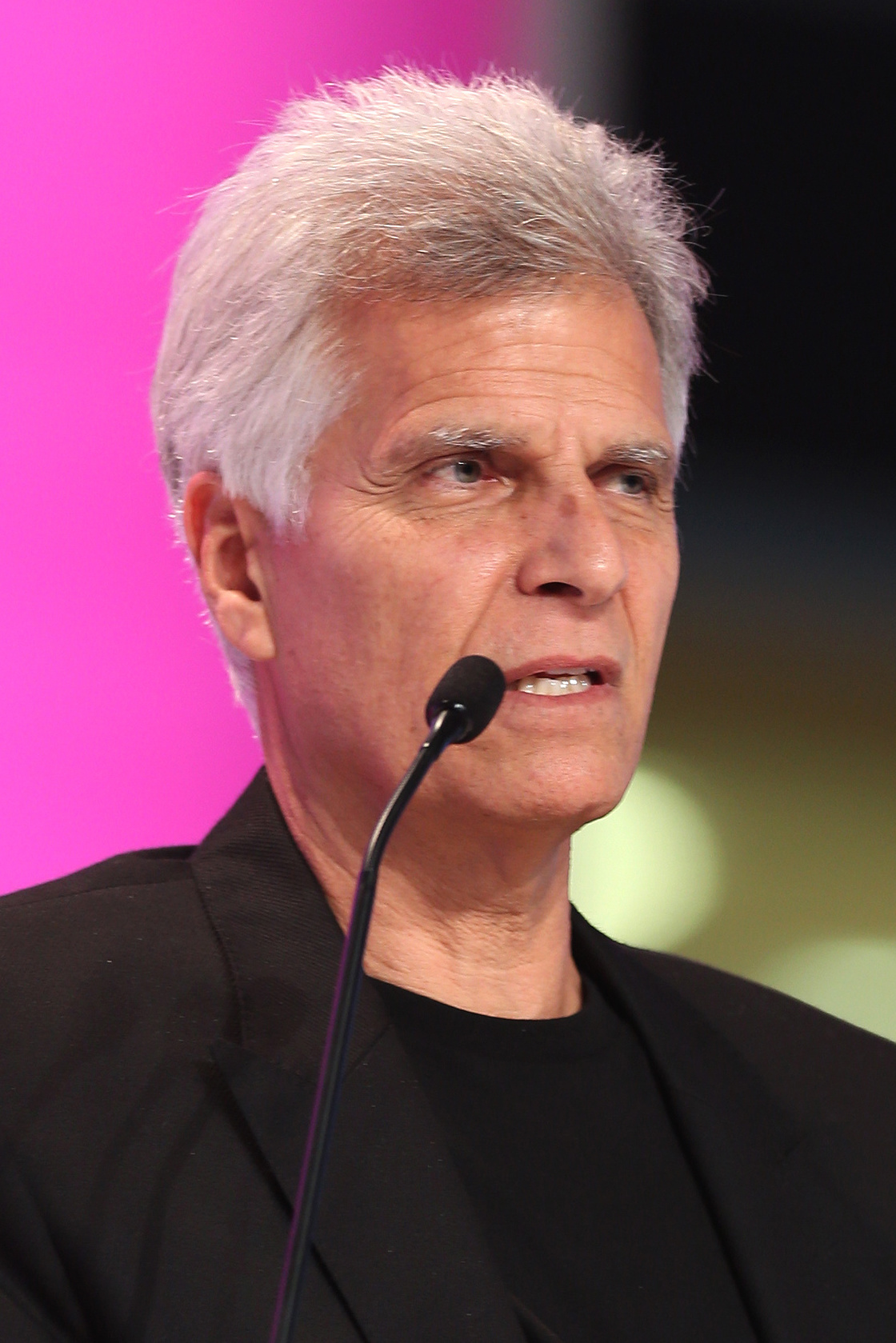
Mark Spitz, winner of the 100-metre freestyle, 200-metre freestyle, 100-metre butterfly, 200-metre butterfly, 4 × 100-metre freestyle relay, 4 × 200-metre freestyle relay, and 4 × 100-metre medley relay.

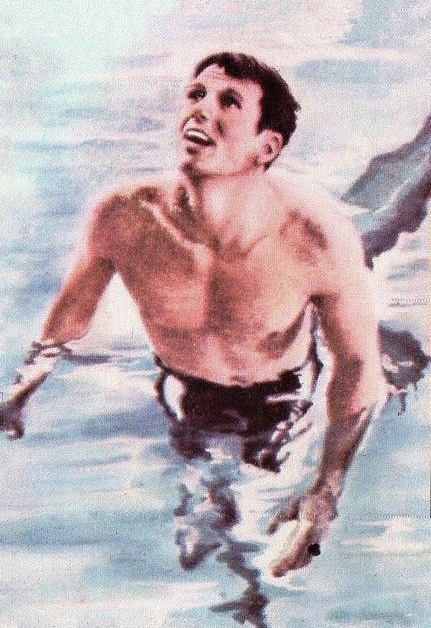
Mike Burton, winner of the 1500-metre freestyle.

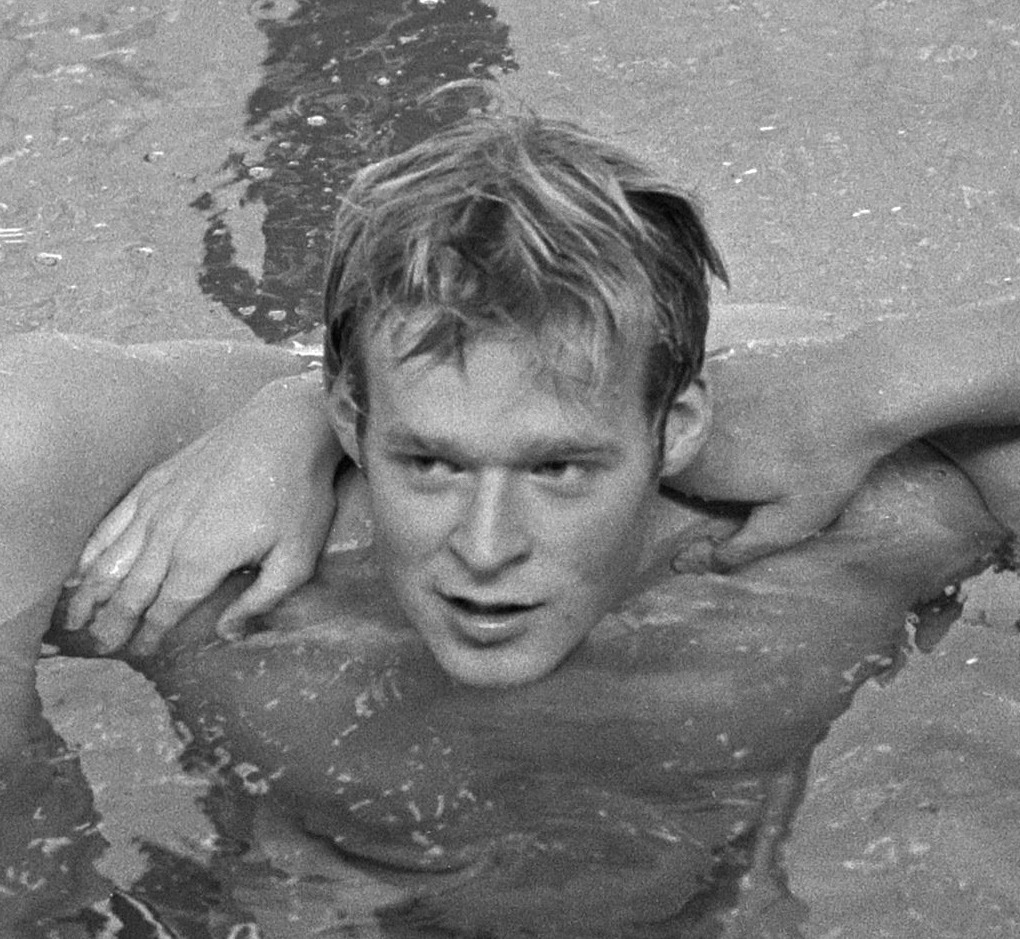
Gunnar Larsson, winner of the 200-metre individual medley and 400-metre individual medley.

Shane Gould, winner of the 200-metre freestyle, 400-metre freestyle, and 200-metre individual medley.

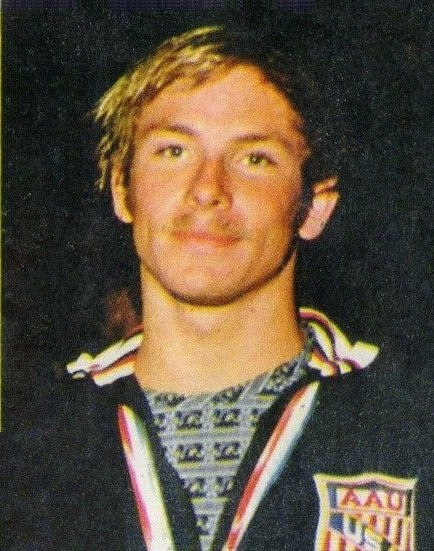
John Hencken, winner of the 200-metre breaststroke.

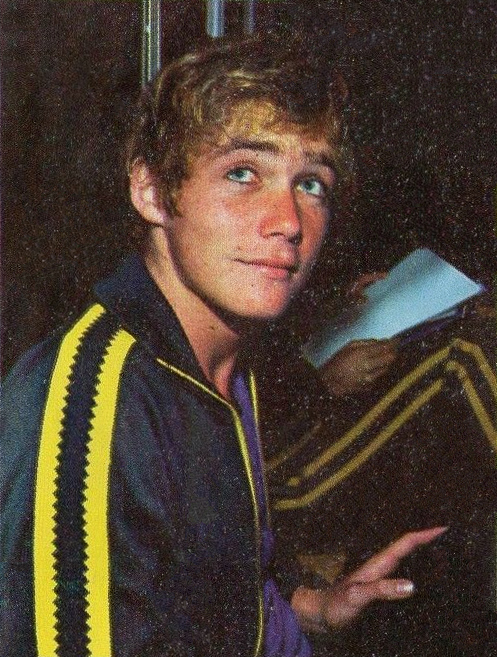
Brad Cooper, winner of the 400-metre freestyle.

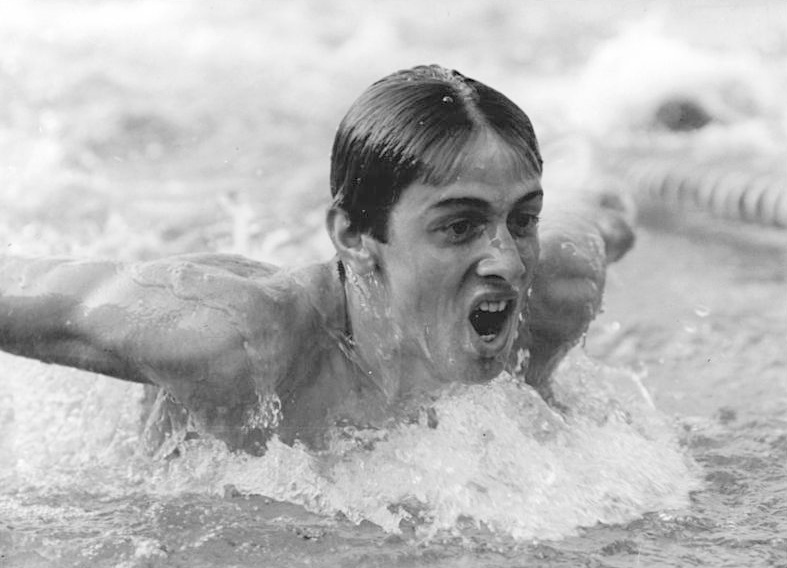
Roland Matthes, winner of the 100-metre backstroke and 200-metre backstroke.

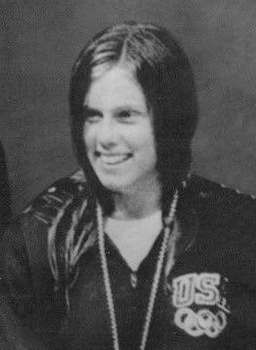
Cathy Carr, winner of the 100-metre breaststroke and 4 × 100-metre medley relay.

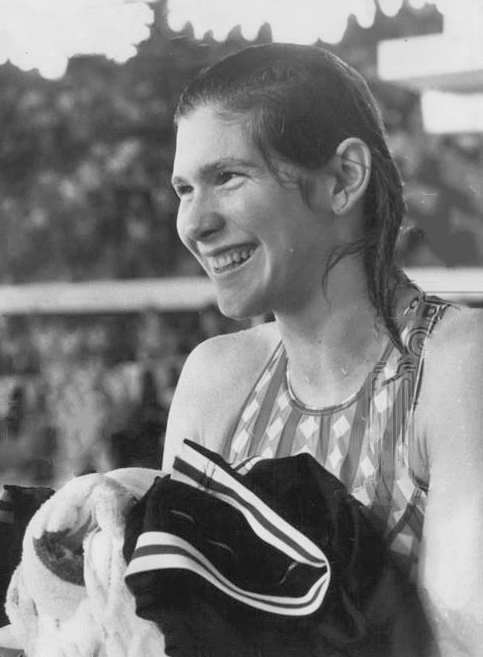
Melissa Belote, winner of the 100-metre backstroke, 200-metre backstroke, and 4 × 100-metre medley relay.
