= Damien Thomlinson =

Australian Paralympic snowboarder

Personal information
- Nickname: Iceman
- Nationality: Australian

Sport
- Country: Australia
- Sport: Para-snowboarding
- Club: Australian Defence Force

Damien Thomlinson is an Australian commando, swimmer, rally car navigator, para-snowboarder and author. He joined the Australian Army in 2005, and went on to serve in Afghanistan. While serving with the 2nd Commando Regiment in Tarin Kowt District in April 2009, the vehicle he was in drove over an improvised explosive planted by the Taliban. Thomlinson was severely injured, suffering wounds to his face, arms and legs; the damage to his legs was so severe that they were amputated. After undergoing extensive rehabilitation, he stayed with his unit in a desk job. In June 2011, to honour the memory of a friend who died in Afghanistan, he walked the 96-kilometre (60 mi) long Kokoda Track on rubber prosthetic legs as part of a 25-man team of Australian soldiers.

Thomlinson regularly participates in Targa rally races where he serves as Team Legacy Assist's navigator. He is also involved in snowboarding, having taken up the sport prior to his injury. He competed for the Australian Defence Force at the 2011 US Marine Corps Paralympic Trials/Exercise Wounded Warrior competition. Outside of these sports, he is a fan of the Sydney City Roosters and has participated in events connected to them and other teams in the National Rugby League. He has written a biography entitled "Without Warning".

== Military ==
Thomlinson joined the Army through the Special Forces Direct Recruiting Scheme in December 2005, and qualified as an elite commando at the age of 24. During his period in the Army's combat units he completed advanced training combat courses. He earned five medals for his service, and has participated in Remembrance Day activities. Because of his military service, he was profiled by the Australian Sixty Minutes in 2010. While still actively serving, Thomlinson has worked to raise funds for the Commando Welfare Trust, an organisation to assist veterans of commando units.

In 2009, Thomlinson was a private serving with the 2nd Commando Regiment in Tarin Kowt District of South Afghanistan. While on night patrol on 3 April 2009, the vehicle he was in ran over an improvised explosive device planted by the Taliban. The explosion caused extensive damage to his body that resulted in both of his legs being amputated, as one leg was obliterated and the other was torn off below the knee. His arms were also severely injured, with the elbow on his right arm coming out through a hole. Both hands and wrists were broken and he had a dislocated shoulder. He also broke his nose and tore his lips. He nearly choked on blood from his cut lips pouring down his throat. The sound of him wheezing alerted others to the fact that he was still alive. His best friend, Private Scott Palmer, aided him by providing immediate medical attention following the explosion in an act that saved Thomlinson's life. Thomlinson was subsequently evacuated to Germany for treatment, and has no memory of the actual incident. While in rehabilitation, he learned how to walk again within several months, with some of his later recovery taking place at the Pain Management Research Institute at Royal North Shore Hospital. He does not have any problems with phantom limb issues that other amputees sometimes deal with.

Following his injury, Thomlinson stayed with the 2nd Commando Regiment, holding a desk job in the unit in August 2010. During that period, his claim with Veterans Affairs was still being dealt with because they look at permanent disability only after that disability has stabilised and his condition had not become stable until a month or so before then. He continued to work in a development role for the Australian Defence Force in 2012.

In June 2011, Thomlinson walked the 96-kilometre (60 mi) long Kokoda Track on rubber prosthetic legs as part of a team of 25 Australian soldiers, including several other soldiers with disabilities, as part of an effort to honour Palmer, who had been killed in a helicopter crash in Afghanistan a week before he had been due to return to Australia. The pair had talked about walking the Track together before Palmer's death. Palmer's father accompanied Thomlinson in memory of his son and that goal of walking the Track together. Thomlinson's disability was the most severe of all those who did the trek. The trek was not the first time Thomlinson had done something in memory of Palmer; in 2010, he watched a charity footy match held in honour of Palmer between two teams from the Northern Territory.

The prosthetic Thomlinson had in 2011 was made from carbon fibre, and Thomlinson did not have a regular gait.

Thomlinson attended a team training session and addressed the Parramatta Eels on behalf of the Commando Welfare Trust before a game in 2011. He was also interviewed by FOX Sports before the start of the 2011 Anzac Day match between the Sydney Roosters and the St. George-Illawarra Dragons.

== Auto racing ==
Thomlinson regularly participates in Targa rally races where he serves as Team Legacy Assist's navigator. In this role, he raised money for the Commando Welfare Trust by competing at the six-day Targa Tasmania classic car rally in April 2011. He took a ride in the #5 Orrcon Steel Ford Performance Racing Falcon at Sydney Olympic Park with the V8 Supercars driver, Mark Winterbottom, in December 2011.

== Para-sport ==
Thomlinson snowboarded prior to being wounded by the Taliban, and took up the sport within a year or two of the event. He went on to be coached by Peter Higgins at the Perisher Ski Resort by 2010. In February 2011, he participated in the North American military programme Ex Wounded Warrior, run by the Canadian Soldier On Program and the United States Marine Corps' Wounded Warrior Regiment, where he learned more about snowboarding in Merville, British Columbia. By 2012, he was trying to make the 2014 Sochi bound Australian Paralympic Winter Games team.

Thomlinson competed at the February 2011 US Marine Corps Paralympic Trials/Exercise Wounded Warrior competition where he represented the Australian Defence Force in swimming. His team earned 1 bronze medal, 11 silver medals and 12 gold medals at the event, with Thomlinson accounting for a gold in the 200m relay and a silver in the 50m freestyle event. Minister for Defence Science and Personnel Warren Snowdon welcomed his team back to Australia following the event.

In May 2011, he was on hand to watch four Australian Defence Force personnel compete at the Arafura Games and Oceania Paralympic Championships.

== Australian Survivor ==
In August 2018, it was revealed that Thomlinson was a contestant on Australian Survivor: Champions vs. Contenders as part of the Champions tribe. Thomlinson, becoming the first amputee to be on Australian Survivor, was well respected by his tribemates for his strong work ethic and kind-hearted persona. In the Champion's first tribal council, Thomlinson was the only vote to keep Survivor veteran Russell Hantz. In the tribe's next tribal council, Thomlinson was perceived as a possible liability in future challenges due to his disability and became the third person voted out. Thomlinson's vote out was met with backlash by many viewers as it was seen as ableist to vote him out.
