= Australian Survivor season 5 =

Australian Survivor
- Season 5
- Presented by: Jonathan LaPaglia
- No. of days: 50
- No. of castaways: 24
- Winner: Shane Gould
- Runner-up: Sharn Coombes
- Location: Savusavu, Fiji
- No. of episodes: 24

Release
- Original network: Network Ten
- Original release: 1 August – 9 October 2018

Additional information
- Filming dates: 3 May – 21 June 2018

Season chronology
- ← Previous; Season 4 (2017) Next → Champions V Contenders II

The fifth season of Australian Survivor, also known as Australian Survivor: Champions V Contenders, is a television series based on the international reality competition franchise Survivor. It is the third season to air on Network Ten and was hosted by Jonathan LaPaglia and filmed in the Fijian community of Savusavu.

The season featured 24 contestants divided into two tribes: "Champions", composed of twelve high-achievers who excelled in their fields, and "Contenders", composed of twelve everyday Australians. The season premiered on 1 August 2018, and concluded on 9 October 2018, where Shane Gould was named the winner over Sharn Coombes in a 5–4 vote, winning the grand prize of A$500,000 and title of Sole Survivor.

== Contestants ==
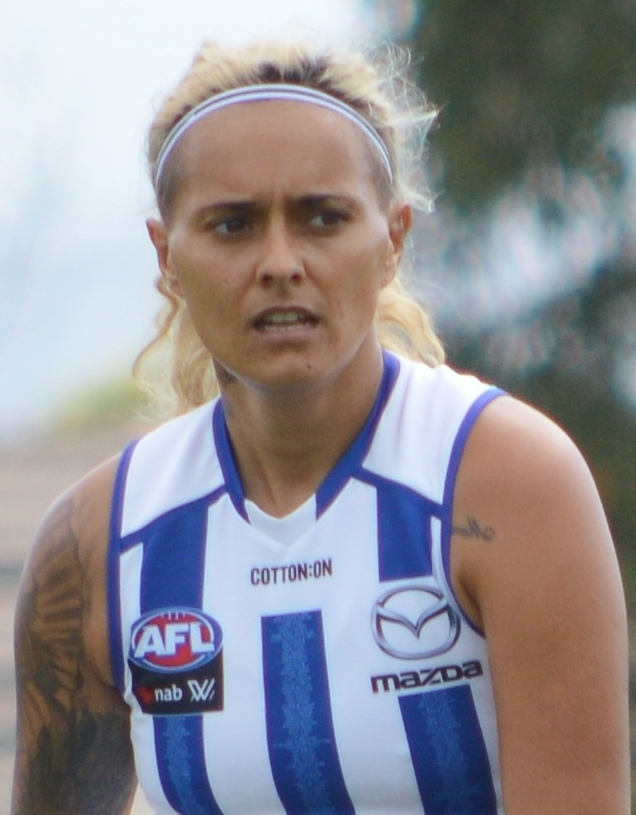
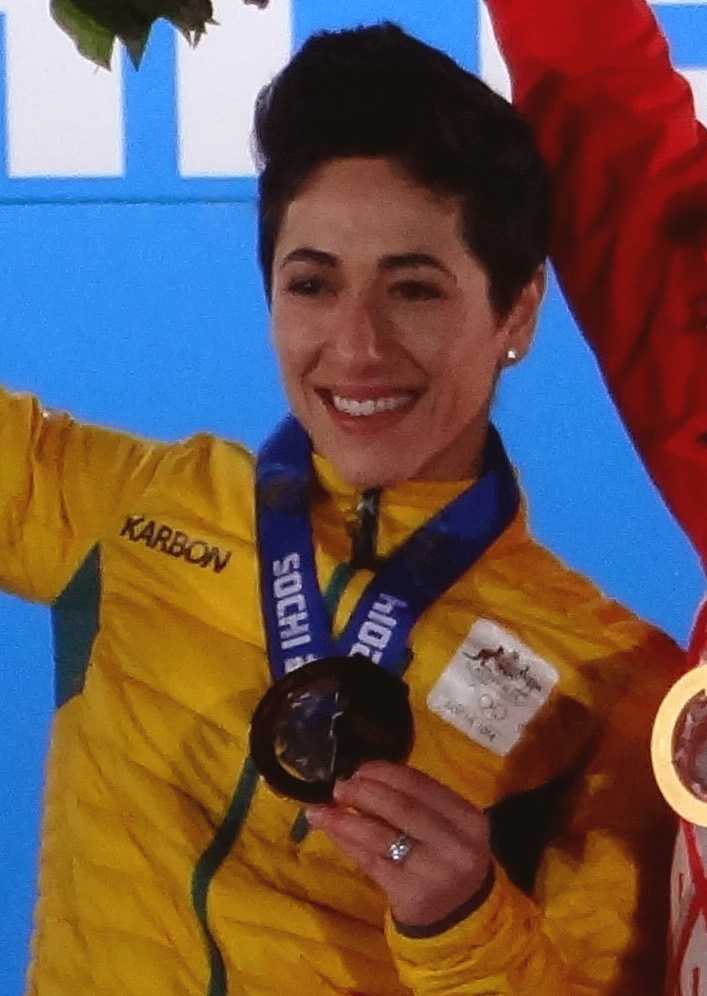
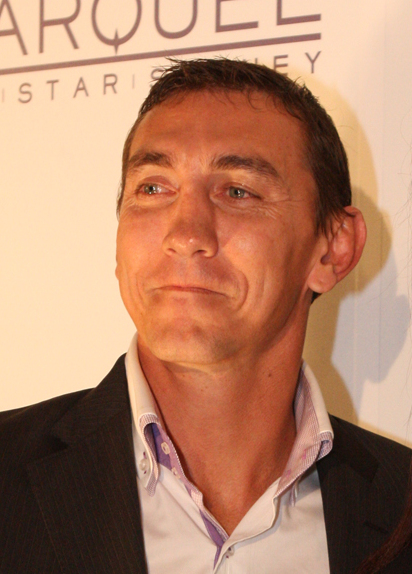
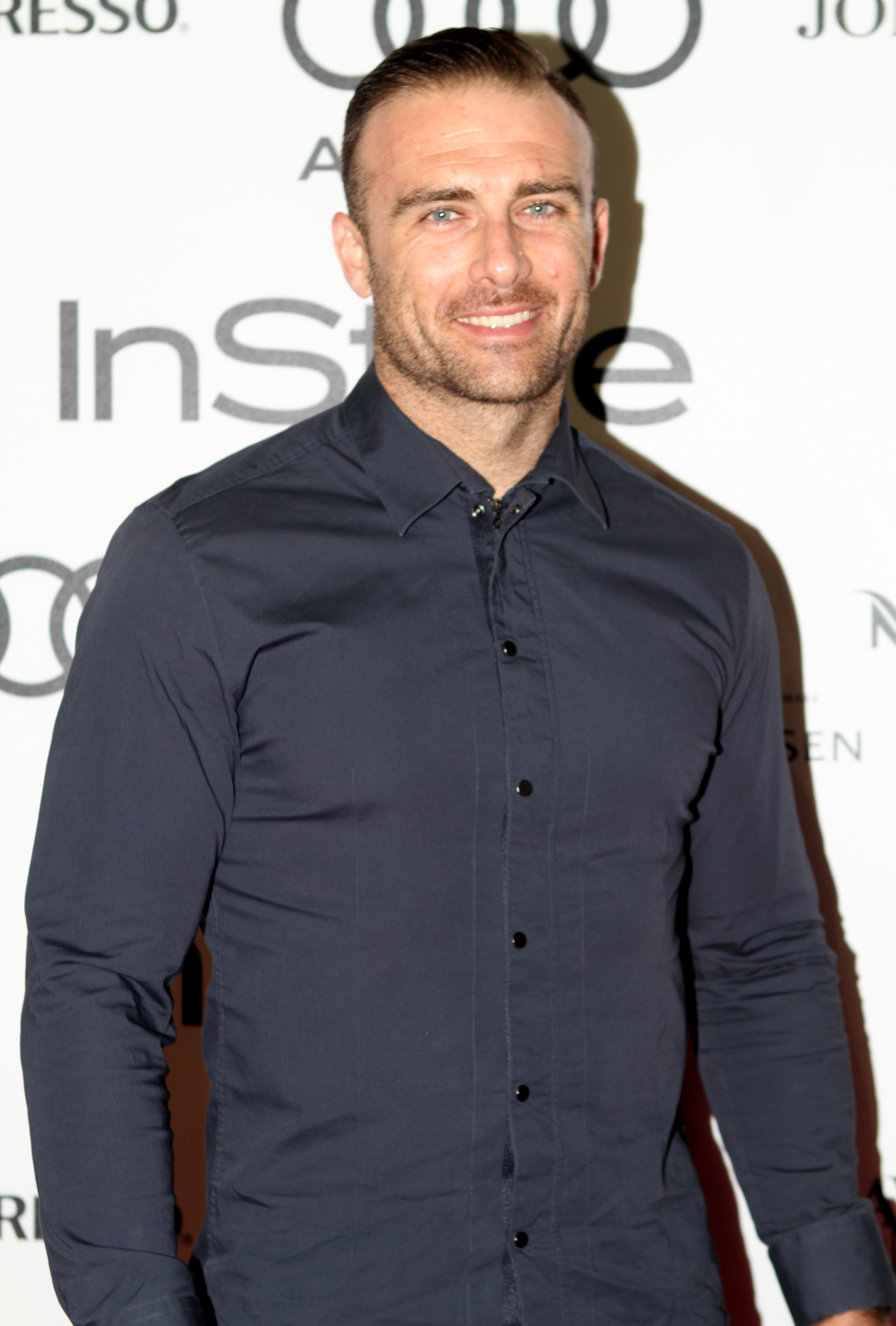
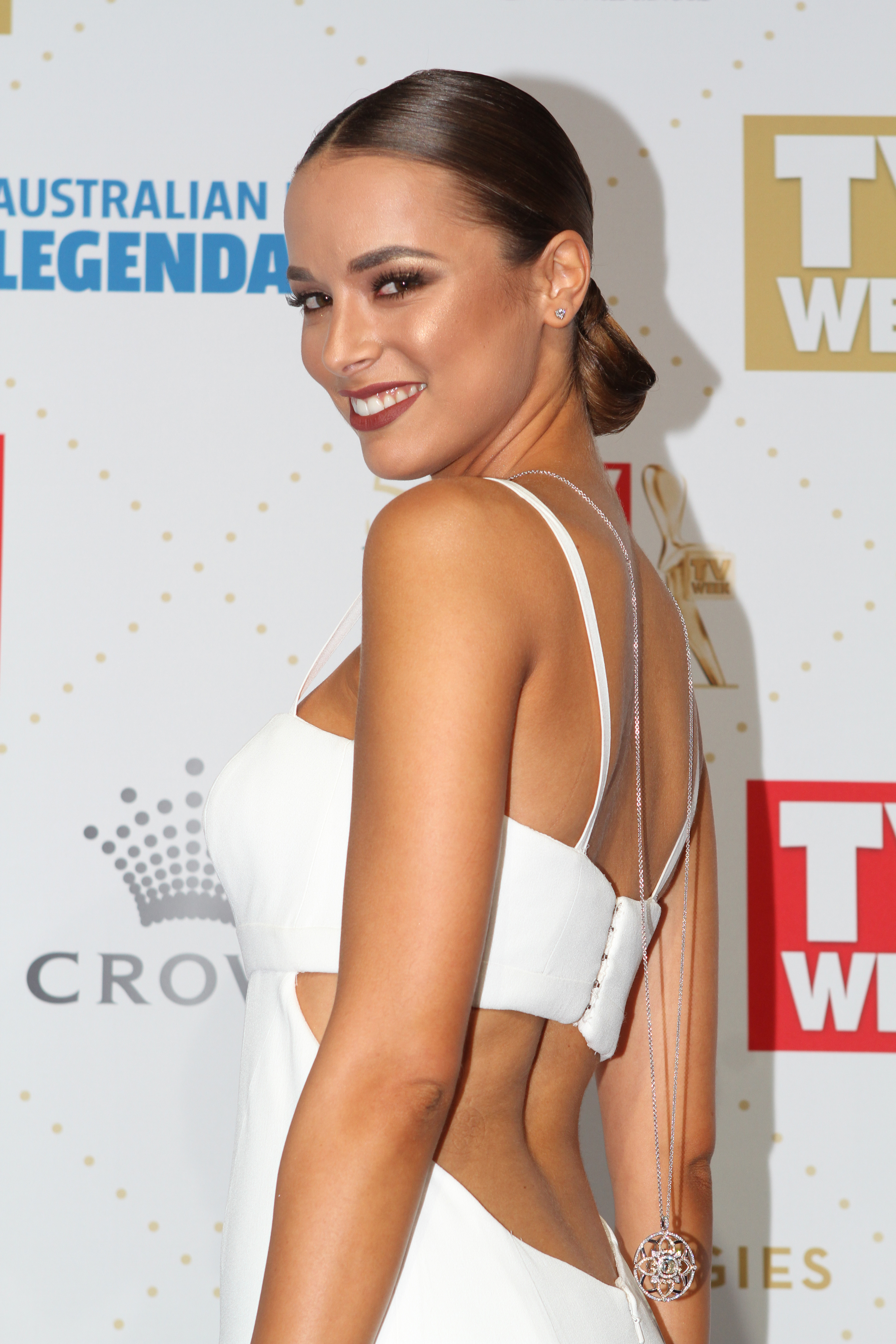
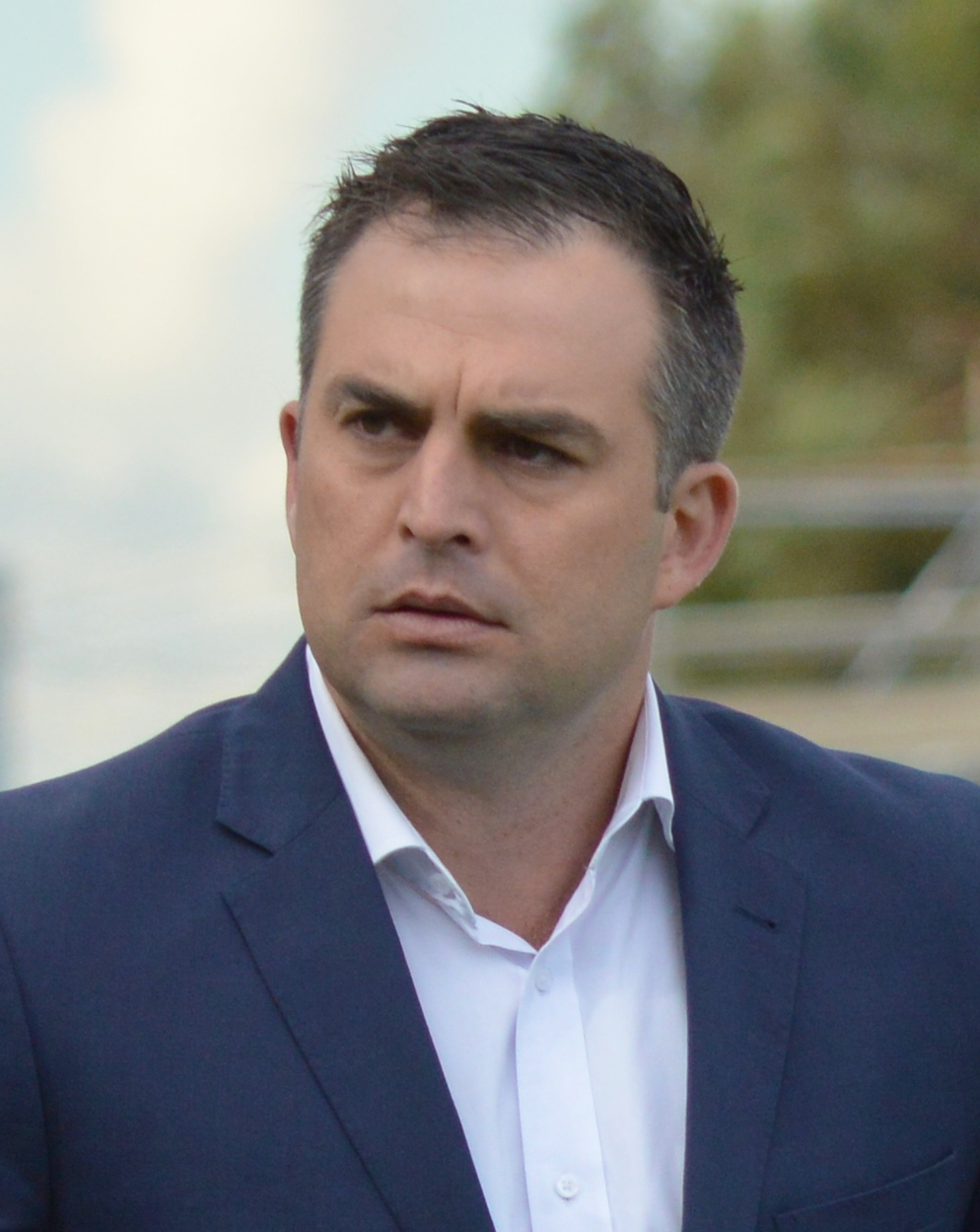
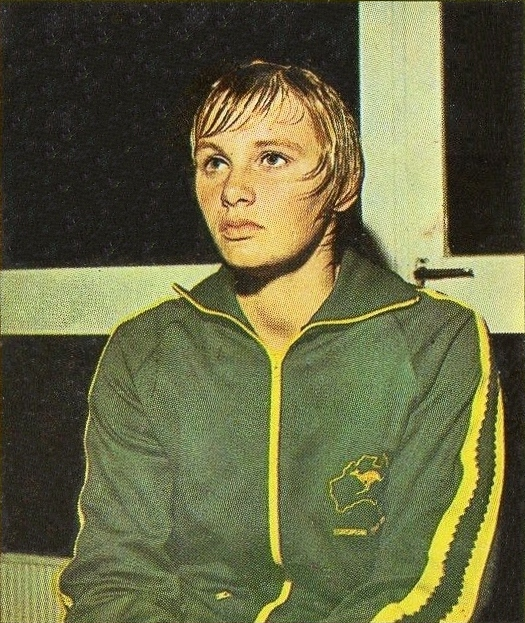
From left to right: Moana Hope, Lydia Lassila, Mat Rogers, Steve Willis, Monika Radulovic, Brian Lake and Shane Gould

The 24 contestants were divided into two tribes based on status: "Champions," composed of 12 people who have received accolades and fame for their exceptional work in their given fields and feature celebrity contestants, and "Contenders," composed of 12 non-celebrities. Among the Champions were Russell Hantz, a three-time contestant on the American Survivor series (having competed on seasons 19, 20 and 22), The Biggest Loser trainer Steve "Commando" Willis, and Olympic gold medalists Lydia Lassila and Shane Gould. The Contenders included Benji Wilson, brother of Australian Survivor 2017 contestant Anneliese Wilson, and Zach Kozyrski, who appeared as a Gladiator in the 2008 revival of Gladiators.

List of Australian Survivor season 5 contestants
Contestant	Original tribe	Switched tribe	Merged tribe	Finish
Matt Dyson; 35, Brisbane, QLD	Contenders			1st voted out Day 2
Russell Hantz; 45, Dayton, Texas, USA; US: Samoa, US: Heroes V Villains, & US: Redemption Island	Champions			2nd voted out Day 5
Damien Thomlinson; 36, Sydney, NSW; Former Special Forces commando	Champions			3rd voted out Day 8
Steve Khouw; 58, Sydney, NSW	Contenders			4th voted out Day 11
Jenna Austin; 28, Perth, WA	Contenders			5th voted out Day 13
Moana Hope; 30, Melbourne, VIC; AFLW player	Champions			6th voted out Day 16
Anita Berkett; 50, Sunshine Coast, QLD	Contenders			Lost Exile Duel (Note: On Days 18 and 20, the losing tribes voted to send a tribemate to Exile Beach; after the two Tribal Councils, the two exiled castaways dueled, with the winner returning to their tribe and the loser being permanently eliminated. Tegan and Anita were exiled, and Tegan defeated Anita in the duel.); Day 21
Zach Kozyrski; 39, Perth, WA	Contenders			8th voted out Day 22
Paige Kerin; 24, Adelaide, SA	Contenders			9th voted out Day 24
Jackie Glazier; 44, Melbourne, VIC; World Series poker player	Champions	Champions		10th voted out Day 26
Tegan Gasior; 32, Derby, WA	Contenders	Champions		11th voted out (Note: After the vote, the Contenders were given an opportunity to save Tegan and absorb her into their tribe, or let the Champions' decision stand. A majority of the Contenders decided to send Tegan home.); Day 28
Heath Davies; 33, Brisbane, QLD	Contenders	Contenders		12th voted out Day 30
Lydia Lassila; 36, Melbourne, VIC; Olympic freestyle skier	Champions	Contenders	Koro Savu	13th voted out Day 32
Robert "Robbie" Skibicki; 26, Adelaide, SA	Contenders	Contenders	Koro Savu	14th voted out 1st jury member Day 33
Samuel Hinton; 26, Brisbane, QLD; Astrophysicist	Champions	Champions	Koro Savu	15th voted out 2nd jury member Day 35
Mat Rogers; 42, Gold Coast, QLD; Former dual-code rugby footballer	Champions	Champions	Koro Savu	16th voted out 3rd jury member Day 37
Benjamin "Benji" Wilson; 26, Melbourne, VIC	Contenders	Contenders	Koro Savu	17th voted out 4th jury member Day 39
Steve Willis; 42, Sydney, NSW; Fitness specialist	Champions	Champions	Koro Savu	18th voted out 5th jury member Day 42
Fenella McGowan; 33, Melbourne, VIC	Contenders	Contenders	Koro Savu	19th voted out 6th jury member Day 44
Monika Radulovic; 27, Sydney, NSW; Miss Universe Australia 2015	Champions	Contenders	Koro Savu	20th voted out 7th jury member Day 46
Shonee Fairfax; 26, Tewantin, QLD	Contenders	Champions	Koro Savu	21st voted out 8th jury member Day 47
Brian Lake; 36, Caroline Springs, VIC; Former AFL footballer	Champions	Champions	Koro Savu	22nd voted out 9th jury member Day 49
Sharn Coombes; 41, Melbourne, VIC; Criminal barrister	Champions	Contenders	Koro Savu	Runner-up; Day 50
Shane Gould; 61, Bicheno, TAS; Olympic swimmer	Champions	Champions	Koro Savu	Sole Survivor; Day 50

=== Future appearances ===
Moana Hope, Zach Kozyrski, Lydia Lassila, Mat Rogers, Shonee Fairfax, Sharn Coombes and Shane Gould competed in Australian Survivor: All Stars. In 2023, Fairfax, now using her maiden name of Bowtell, Jackie Glazier and Steve Khouw competed as villains in Australian Survivor: Heroes V Villains. In 2025, Bowtell competed on Survivor: Australia v The World.

Outside of Survivor, Rogers competed on the second season of The Summit in 2024. In 2026, Gould competed on the third season of The Traitors.

== Season summary ==
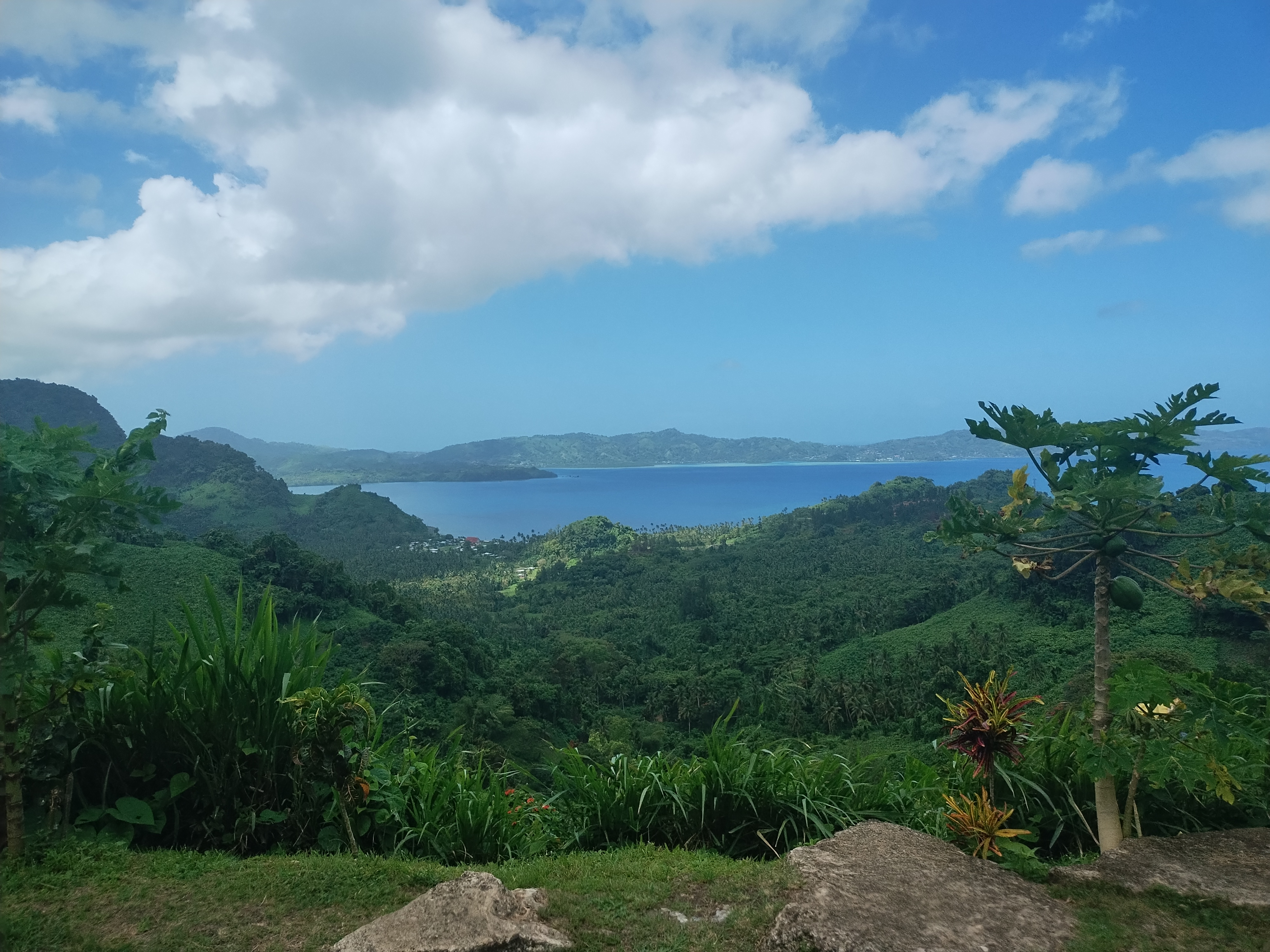
The season filmed in Savusavu in Fiji.

The 24 contestants were divided into two tribes. The Contenders, representing everyday Australians, faced off against the Champions, high achievers in their respective fields. Brian, Jackie, Monika, and Shane were initially outsiders at the Champions tribe. Meanwhile, at the Contenders tribe, Benji took strategic control of the tribe, and three pairs emerged: Benji & Robbie, Fenella & Shonee, and Heath & Tegan (the latter of whom re-entered the game from Exile Beach after getting blindsided by Benji). The Champions dominated challenges until a tribe swap sent Shonee and Tegan to the Champions and Lydia, Monika, & Sharn to the Contenders. Benji and Robbie worked with their new Champions tribemates, while the Contenders on the new Champions tribe tried, but failed, to infiltrate the majority.

The merge occurred with 12 players left; though most of the Champions wanted to pick off the rest of the Contenders, Mat and Shane were threatened by Lydia's challenge prowess and blindsided her before Robbie was eliminated. Having lost his closest ally, Benji overthrew the majority to blindside Mat before his own elimination followed. The pairs of Brian & Monika and Fenella & Shonee realigned against Sharn; she played an idol, and Brian's paranoia led to him deviating from their alliance's split-vote plan in order to vote out Fenella. Shonee sought revenge by eliminating Brian's own closest ally Monika, but Brian's victory in the final four immunity challenge led to Shane and Sharn voting out Shonee. Sharn then voted Brian out after winning final immunity, staying true to her final two deal with Shane.

Despite being the more strategically and physically dominant of the two, Sharn was criticized for being unlikeable and preaching loyalty despite playing both sides and failing to save her closest ally Mat. Shane, however, despite being less aggressive, was commended for her grace, likeability, underdog status and work ethic despite her advanced age. She won the votes from the female jurors Fenella, Monika and Shonee, plus Mat and Brian to narrowly win the title of Sole Survivor.

Challenge winners and eliminations by episode

Tribal phase (Day 1–30)
Episode		Challenge winner(s)		Eliminated	Finish
No.	Air date	Reward	Immunity	Eliminated	Finish
1	1 August 2018	Draw (Note: Each tribe earned items for their survival; while there was no designated winner, both teams earned the same amount of items.)	Champions	Matt	1st voted out Day 2
2	2 August 2018	Champions	Contenders	Russell	2nd voted out Day 5
3	6 August 2018	Champions	Contenders	Damien	3rd voted out Day 8
4	7 August 2018	Champions	Champions	Steve K.	4th voted out Day 11
5	8 August 2018	Champions	Champions	Jenna	5th voted out Day 13
6	9 August 2018	Champions	Contenders	Moana	6th voted out Day 16
6	9 August 2018	Mat (Note: At the end of the Reward Challenge, the Contenders were given the option to pick two members from the Champions tribe to compete for a special breakfast reward. They chose Steve W. and Mat which Mat won. Mat was then tasked to choose someone from the Contenders tribe to join him on the reward. He chose Paige.)	Contenders	Moana	6th voted out Day 16
6	9 August 2018	[Paige]	Contenders	Moana	6th voted out Day 16
7	13 August 2018	None	Champions	Tegan	7th voted out Exiled (Note: On Days 18 and 20, the losing tribes voted to Exile a tribemate. After two Tribal Councils, the two exiled castaways competed in a duel, with the winner returning to their tribe and the loser being permanently eliminated. Tegan and Anita were exiled, and Tegan defeated Anita in the duel.); Day 18
8	14 August 2018	Champions	Champions	Anita	8th voted out Exiled; Day 20
9	20 August 2018	None (Note: No Reward Challenge, due to Exile Duel.)	Champions	Anita	Lost Exile Duel; Day 21
9	20 August 2018	None	Champions	Zach	9th voted out Day 22
10	21 August 2018	Contenders	Champions	Paige	10th voted out Day 24
11	27 August 2018	None (Note: No Reward Challenge, due to tribe swap.)	Contenders	Jackie	11th voted out Day 26
12	28 August 2018	Contenders	Contenders	Tegan	12th voted out (Note: On Day 28, the person voted out of their tribe would have the opportunity to be saved by the other tribe instead of going home. Following the reveal of the vote, the other tribe would also vote, voting to Save the person voted off and have them join their tribe or to Send him/her home. Tegan was voted out of the Champions tribe and the Contenders voted Send, officially eliminating Tegan from the game.); Day 28
13	3 September 2018	None	Champions	Heath	13th voted out Day 30

Individual phase (Day 31–50)
Episode		Challenge winner(s)		Eliminated	Finish
No.	Air date	Reward	Immunity	Eliminated	Finish
14	4 September 2018	Survivor; Auction	Sharn	Lydia	14th voted out Day 32
15	10 September 2018	None	Sharn	Robbie	15th voted out 1st jury member Day 33
16	11 September 2018	Mat [Fenella, Sharn]	Mat	Samuel	16th voted out 2nd jury member Day 35
17	17 September 2018	None	Benji	Mat	17th voted out 3rd jury member Day 37
18	18 September 2018	Brian, Monika, Shane, Sharn	Brian	Benji	18th voted out 4th jury member Day 39
19	24 September 2018	None	Shonee	No elimination on Day 40 due to Dead Man Walking vote. (Note: Instead of voting out a castaway, Koro Savu voted for a tribe members to be a "Dead Man Walking". Making them unable to vote at the next two tribal councils. Steve W. was voted to be the Dead Man Walking. Additionally, Steve W. was Exiled between the Reward Challenge on Day 41 and the Immunity Challenge on Day 42.)	
20	25 September 2018	Brian, Shane, Sharn	Brian	Steve W.	19th voted out 5th jury member Day 42
21	1 October 2018	None	Brian	Fenella	20th voted out 6th jury member Day 44
22	2 October 2018	Brian [Monika]	Sharn	Monika	21st voted out 7th jury member Day 46
23	8 October 2018	None	Brian	Shonee	22nd voted out 8th jury member Day 47
24	9 October 2018	None	Sharn	Brian	23rd voted out 9th jury member Day 49
24	9 October 2018			Final vote	
24	9 October 2018			Sharn	Runner-up; Day 50
24	9 October 2018			Shane	Sole Survivor; Day 50

In the case of multiple tribes or castaways who win reward or immunity, they are listed in order of finish, or alphabetically where it was a team effort; where one castaway won and invited others, the invitees are in brackets.

=== Episodes ===
No. overall	No. in season	Title	Timeline	Original release date
79	1	"Episode 1"	Days 1-2	1 August 2018
This season, 12 Contenders take on a tribe of 12 Champions that includes rugby players, an Olympic Gold Medal swimmer, a double amputee veteran, Ms. Australia, and US Survivor veteran Russell Hantz (this was the first series to be commissioned by CBS in Australia following their acquisition of Network Ten in 2017, meaning the first crossover between US and Australian series). When the tribes first meet, they immediately compete in their first Reward Challenge.: Reward challenge: One castaway from each tribe will start at the top of a waterslide. When Jonathan LaPaglia says "go", he will pull a lever, where an object in a suspended net will zip line down to a sandpit at the bottom of the slide, and the castaways will then race down the slide into the sandpit. The person to get to their tribe's mat with the object in hand wins it for their tribe.; During the Reward Challenge, the Contenders win a pillow along with bags of rice and pineapple. The Champions win a bag of oranges, rope, and a fire making kit with flint. During the Challenge, Steve from the Contenders is spotted by everyone looking through the reward items and is accused of looking for an idol clue. At Champions, Russell is aware that he will be seen as a big threat given his gameplay in previous seasons. Russell expresses frustration that nobody on the tribe seems interested in talking strategy and seem to just be hanging out and building a family. Russell talks with Monika in an attempt to convince her to work with him, comparing her to Natalie on Survivor Samoa. Later that day, Russell is also able to find the Hidden Immunity Idol hidden in a tree. Russell is determined to teach the Australian players a thing or two about how the game is played. At Contenders, Robbie leads the tribe in building the shelter. Steve takes the opportunity to start looking for the Hidden Immunity Idol in order to gain some power in the game. However, Steve is not very subtle with his searching and Matt notices him looking for the idol. Matt warns everyone that Steve is continuing his search and the tribe thinks Steve should be voted out first.: Immunity challenge: Ten castaways from each tribe will have to go over a 4-metre wall and down a cargo net. Once everyone is on top, they will then untie a battering ram, which they'll manoeuvre through a series of obstacles. They will then use the battering ram to smash through a stone wall to get the battering ram to the remaining two tribe members. From there, the runners will use keys to retrieve puzzle pieces inside the battering ram. Once the puzzle solvers complete the hanging puzzle, they will then use sandbags to knock down the pieces. The first tribe to knock down all of their pieces wins. (Champions Win); During the Immunity Challenge, Jenna ends up slipping and injures her ankle. Paige and Matt also struggle with putting the puzzle together, allowing the Champions to win. Back at Contenders, Steve is feeling vulnerable about the vote and attempts to establish an alliance with Zach to get Jenna voted out as the weak link. However, Zach has already joined with the majority of the tribe in agreeing to vote Steve out. The tribe believes that Steve doesn't fit in socially with everyone and he's been looking for the idol. Matt is concerned that Steve might have found the idol and wants to split the vote tonight. However, when Matt goes to talk to people, he believes he's not getting a good vibe from anyone and nobody is giving him a name for whom to vote for. Matt tries to reaffirm his alliance with Zach, Benji, Heath, and Robbie, but he believes that they are not giving him a straight answer and are acting sketchy. Matt believes that he is in trouble, tonight, and goes to search for the idol. Tegan and Robbie spot Matt searching for the idol and are concerned that he is getting too paranoid for his own good. At Tribal Council, the tribe talks about how first impressions can affect a person's game. During Tribal, Matt begins to go on the offensive and attacks Steve for searching for the idol, accuses the women of not playing the game at all, and believes that Zach is the leader of a bromance alliance with the men on the tribe. Matt informs everyone that he felt like nobody was giving him a straight answer when he tried to talk to them today. Everyone is shocked by Matt's conduct and several people remark that only two days into the game, people may not be ready to reveal their entire plans to everyone. Benji remarks to Matt that nobody was coming after him and he just now attacked the entire tribe with his remarks. Before the tribe votes, many people start to use the phrase "stick to the plan." When the votes are read, Benji, Jenna, Matt, Robbie, and Tegan vote for Steve. However, it is revealed that the rest of the women discussed voting out Matt before Tribal Council and Heath and Zach join them in the vote due to losing all trust in Matt, subsequently voting him out with seven votes.
80	2	"Episode 2"	Days 3-5	2 August 2018
At Contenders, Steve knows that he dodged a bullet last night and tries to work on building relationships with his tribe members to stay in the game. Steve attempts to align with the rest of the men while Tegan and Heath bond over the fact that they are both parents who are missing their kids. At Champions, Jackie reveals in private that she has told the tribe she's a speed Rubik's Cube player, but she's actually the best female poker player in Australia. Meanwhile, the rest of the Champions are concerned that Russell is starting to cause friction in camp and people believe he is playing the game just like he does in the US and they want him voted out. In an attempt to take the target off of himself, Russell gathers the tribe together and shows them that he has the Hidden Immunity Idol so he guarantees he will not be going at the first Tribal Council.: Reward challenge: One member from each tribe faces off on a platform surrounded by water, where they will attempt to knock the other off using padded bags. The first tribe to score 7 points wins comfort items. (Champions Win); At Contenders, the tribe is struggling after losing two challenges in a row, but they all get together and vow to beat the Champions at the next challenge. At Champions, Russell believes that showing everyone the idol actually makes people want to work with him now. Russell attempts to create alliances with Jackie, Mat, and Damian. Russell promises Jackie and Mat on his wedding ring that he is with them and even states that he'll give them his wedding ring as a sign of trust. However, Russell reveals in private that he isn't actually married and brought multiple fake wedding rings with him for the game. Later that night, Russell talks with Damian about their long term game. Moana overhears their talk and is determined to make a move against Russell as he is the most dangerous player in the game.: Immunity challenge: Tribe will race out into the water to retrieve four hanging buoys. They will climb to the top of a floating tower. Once they are up there, they will need to dive back into the water to retrieve four more buoys that are underwater. Once they have all eight buoys, they will attempt to get all eight into a basket from the top of their tribe's tower. The first tribe to get all eight buoys in their basket wins. (Contenders Win); Back at camp, Champions begin to discuss the vote. Jackie suggests to some people that the vote be split between Russell and either Shane or Damian to flush Russell's idol or get rid of a weak player. Many don't agree with Jackie's suggestion and Jackie feels she might have painted a target on herself by mentioning this plan. Russell's plan is to create so much chaos regarding the vote that there will be no majority vote against him. Russell approaches the men with a plan to vote out Jackie, then talks with others about voting out Damian, and even later discusses voting out Shane. Russell's goal is to try and split the vote so much that he doesn't have to play his idol tonight. Later, Moana, Lydia, Monika, Shane and Sharn gather to discuss Russell's antics during the day, noting that he's trying to stir the pot like always. The women discuss voting for Russell despite him having the idol. At Tribal Council, Russell openly wears his idol, stating he knew he was a huge target coming into the game and he is trying to survive another night. Russell states that the gameplay was slow and he was forced to play hard just to survive. Others criticize Russell for his actions while Damian, Jackie, and Shane also express concern over being voted out based on discussions today. Russell informs everyone that he is going to play his idol and will not be going home tonight. When the voting takes place, Russell gambles and decides not to play his idol. When the votes are read, there is a 4-4 tie between Russell and Jackie. The rest of the tribe votes again. While Damian stays loyal to Russell and votes Jackie, the remainder of the tribe votes for Russell, eliminating him from the game.
81	3	"Episode 3"	Days 6-8	6 August 2018
After Tribal Council, Moana and Sharn celebrate their role in blindsiding Russell and calling his bluff at Tribal. Moana reveals that she's playing Survivor to win and provide for her sister that she cares for and this move has definitely helped her game in a positive way. Meanwhile, Jackie is concerned with being voted out next as she did receive four votes at Tribal Council. Jackie believes the men want her out next, so she's hoping to convince the tribe to vote out Damian next because of his physical limitations and because if Damian got to the end, he would win the game with his backstory. Damian hopes that he can continue to prove to his tribe that, despite not having his legs, he can perform well and will always give it his all in the challenges.: Reward challenge: In one-on-one face-offs, castaways will attempt to kick a penalty shot into a goal. One person will be the striker, the other the goalie. If the striker gets the ball into the net, they earn a point. Once the ball is saved or the striker earns a point, they'll switch positions. If a castaway can't get a goal, neither tribe will earn a point. First tribe to score seven points wins a fishing kit and a fish meal to go along with it. (Champions Win); At Contenders, Heath finds a Hidden Immunity Idol clue hidden in a bottle in the watering well. He reads it and it reveals that the idol is hidden at the next Tribal Council in the voting urn lid. Heath knows the Contenders will have to lose Immunity in order for him to get it. However, while walking down the path, Robbie spots the bottle inside Heath's pants so Heath is forced to reveal he found a clue but he does not reveal the idol's location at Tribal. At Champions, while the tribe is enjoying their fish reward, Moana is not able to fully partake in the meal as she is a vegetarian. While the tribe is eating, an idol clue falls out from under the tablecloth. Several people step over it without seeing it, but Moana is able to spot the clue and grabs it unseen. It is the same clue Heath received so Moana knows the Champions will have to lose in order for her to get the idol.: Immunity challenge: Seven members of each tribe will push a giant chariot on the top. From the top of the chariot, two more members will attempt to fish several baskets of puzzle pieces. Once they have all they baskets, they will hand them over to the final two tribe members, who will use the pieces to solve a puzzle. The first tribe to finish their puzzle wins. (Contenders Win); The Immunity Challenge is a blowout for the Champions as Shane and Damian struggled with fishing the baskets and Jackie failed horribly at the puzzle. At camp, Jackie is in tears over the loss and apologizes to the entire tribe for not performing well. Jackie pleads with them all to consider her collective effort before they vote her out. She later reveals that she planned the speech and the tears, hoping to garner sympathy. Jackie continues her campaign to get Damian out. However, Moana is concerned that Jackie is playing a strong game and speaks with Mat and Steve about voting out Jackie. Steve refuses to vote out Damian because they both served in the armed forces and Steve is upset that some people on the tribe seem to overlook the fact that Damian lost his legs while serving his country. The rest of the tribe struggles with the decision because they're concerned about what future challenges Damian might not do well in versus Jackie playing a very active strategic game and causing trouble in the tribe. At Tribal Council, the tribe discusses how to keep itself stronger in the challenges moving forward and both Jackie and Damian reveal that they are vulnerable for the vote tonight. While the tribe is voting, Moana is able to grab the idol from underneath the voting urn lid. When the votes are read, Mat voted for Shane, Steve and Damian voted for Jackie, but the remainder of the tribe voted based on strength in the challenges and voted out Damian. Damian becomes the third person voted out.
82	4	"Episode 4"	Days 9-11	7 August 2018
At Contenders, Steve believes that he is starting to form the right relationships with people in the game and is more confident about his position. Steve has aligned himself with Zach, Robbie, and Benji, seeing them as strong players that will take him far into the game. Steve and Zach intend on voting out one of the younger women next to keep the tribe strong. Zach is also feeling good about his position as he feels he has the numbers on his side. At Champions, the tribe is trying to pick itself up after two losses in a row. Mat realizes that Damian getting voted out shows him that he needs to start playing more aggressively. Moana has formed tight bonds with both Sharn and Mat and reaffirms her alliance with the two of them. In order to solidify her alliance with Mat, Moana reveals to him that she found the Hidden Immunity Idol and actually gives it to him to hold for her as a sign of trust.: Reward challenge: One member from each tribe will attempt to hold onto a pole, while two members of the opposing tribe try to drag them to the finish line, earning a point. The first tribe to 3 points wins. (Champions Win); During the Reward Challenge, Jenna's bad ankle gets pulled on during the competition and she screams in pain. The medics decide that she cannot compete in future challenges until they run some more tests on her. The tribe is concerned about Jenna because they like her and believe she is an asset to the tribe, but they are concerned about her ankle. Jenna vows that she is not going to give up. Later at the Contenders, the tribe notices a division forming between the men and the women of the tribe. Anita, Shonee, and Fenella are concerned that Zach, Robbie, Benji, and Steve think they're running the show and want to eliminate the three of them because they are weakest. Shonee is particularly tired of Zach, finding him arrogant.: Immunity challenge: Tribe will have to chop down a rope to release a large ball. They will then maneuver the ball under a cargo net and hoist it up a steep wall. They will then use another rope to hoist the ball up and use it to break four targets. The first tribe to break all of their targets wins. (Champions Win); Back at Contenders, Anita, Shonee, and Fenella plot to vote Steve out of the tribe finding that he is too close to the men and they find him to be a bit of a loose cannon and too much of a strategic threat. Anita believes that if Steve is voted out, then Zach, Benji, and Robbie will feel less comfortable with their positions in the tribe. The three hope to recruit Tegan, Heath, and Jenna to join their side of the vote for the majority. Meanwhile, Zach, Benji, Robbie, Paige, Tegan, Heath, and Jenna talk at the well and agree to vote out Shonee. Paige has pledged her loyalty to the men, finding that they can take her farther into the game. However, Zach, Benji, and Robbie later reveal to the others that the plan is really to vote out Paige because they find her to be the weakest on the tribe and they feel she is playing both sides. Tegan, Heath, and Jenna realize that they are the swing votes and the three have concerns about both Steve and Paige in the game. At Tribal Council, the tribe discusses the importance of trust, the relationships they have made in the game, and whether there is a true gender divide in the tribe. When the votes are cast, it is revealed that Tegan, Heath, and Jenna joined with Anita, Shonee, and Fenella to vote Steve out of the game.
83	5	"Episode 5"	Days 12-13	8 August 2018
At Contenders, many people on the tribe are shocked by Steve's elimination. Paige is upset that the men voted for her when she really thought she could trust them. Zach, Benji, and Robbie know they made a mistake voting for Paige and they try to mend their relationship with her to keep her on their side. While Paige wishes she has other options, she feels she has no other choice but to trust the men because the other women don't really trust her. At Champions, Lydia and Sharn are frustrated with Brian's lack of work ethic around the camp. Sharn states that the tribe does need Brian for the challenges, for now, but when he's no longer needed she thinks he'll be gone immediately. Brian states that his strategy is to play a mental game, he's not looking to overwork himself, and he relaxes throughout the day so he can have the mental strength to survive another day.: Reward challenge: The tribes must transport eight members and a grappling hook to cross a field only using Using three barrels and two wooden planks. From there, two more tribe members will use the grappling hook to get four balls. They will then have to attempt to balance the balls on a see-sawing frame. The first to get all four balls balance wins. The winning tribe will receive meat pies and beer. (Champions Win); Before the Reward Challenge, when Jonathan questions the contestants, Paige reveals that the Contenders' Tribal was not a unanimous vote, that she received votes, and people are questioning their relationships on the tribe. Back at camp, the tribe is feeling extremely defeated over losing every Reward Challenge. Anita does not appreciate the way Paige revealed information to the Champions. Zach is extremely frustrated with the women's performance in the challenges and he believes that a woman needs to go next in order for the tribe to win. When the Champions go on their reward, they notice that there's a photo wall of all of them and some of their greatest accomplishments that they've achieved as champions. Particularly, the tribe gets to reflect on Shane's accomplishments as an Olympic Gold Swimmer and Mat's relationship with his autistic son and his charity that he founded to help other families.: Immunity challenge: Six members from each tribe will have to slide down into the water to get to a platform. Once all six are on the platform, they will get in the canoe and paddle out to a buoy to collect three rings. They will then need to paddle back to the slide and climb back up to the top of a platform, where the remaining three members will toss the rings on a peg. The first tribe to get all three rings on the peg wins. (Champions Win); Before the Immunity Challenge, Jenna is temporarily taken out of the game to get x-rays done on her ankle. When the Contenders return to camp, they unanimously agree that Jenna has to leave because she can't contribute a hundred percent with her hurt ankle. This is devastating to a lot of people because Jenna is well-liked and tough, but the tribe needs to win. Anita proposes to the women's alliance that they vote out Paige instead because she doesn't trust her. Tegan has formed a close friendship and alliance with Jenna and doesn't want to see her go. Tegan asks Heath if he would consider getting rid of Paige instead of Jenna, but Heath says no. Jenna returns to camp in a cast and crutch, indicating that she might have hurt a ligament or tendon but has no fracture. Tegan tells Jenna that her name is on the chopping block which devastates Jenna. Jenna has mixed feelings about her position in the game because she knows that she can't run or swim, but she can do puzzles and she's not ready to give up this chance at playing Survivor. At Tribal Council, the tribe discusses Jenna's ankle and how it affects the tribe. Paige discusses feeling vulnerable after last Tribal Council and Anita flat out states that she doesn't trust Paige in the game and not a lot of other people do. The debate between the tribe is whether to vote out Jenna, who is injured but trustworthy, or Paige, who is not injured but not trusted. Jenna does make a plea to her tribe to keep her, indicating her strengths and the bonds she has created. When the votes are cast, everyone unanimously picks tribe strength over trust and sends Jenna home.
84	6	"Episode 6"	Days 14-16	9 August 2018
At Champions, Shane does feel like she's getting to know her tribe better, but she feels vulnerable because of her age and hopes to find an idol. Things have also taken a bad turn for Moana as she has been sick to her stomach and cannot keep any food down. At Contenders, the tribe is feeling sad about Jenna leaving the game. However, the tribe hopes to bounce back from this loss and finally beat the Champions.: Reward challenge: One member of each tribe will face off in a Survivor-style tug-of-war competition while balancing on floating barrels. The person left standing wins a point for their tribe. The first tribe to seven points wins iced coffee and breakfast sandwiches. (Champions Win); After the Reward Challenge, Mat and Steve are chosen to compete in an individual reward for a whole breakfast meal. Mat wins and is given the chance to choose someone from the Contenders to join him for the breakfast. Mat picks Paige. After the tribe leaves, Shane stays behind to look for an idol clue, but doesn't find one. The Contenders believe that Mat chose Paige because he wants to get tribe secrets from her and they are concerned about how much Paige will share. During the Reward, Paige does confide in Mat that nobody on her tribe trusts her and breaks down the relationships that have formed on the Contenders. Mat believes that he has gotten some good information to use. When Paige returns to camp, she tells the Contenders that she never talked strategy with Mat and he didn't reveal anything. Anita doesn't buy Paige's story and believes that Paige did reveal tribe secrets to Mat. Back at Champions, Shane begins to brazenly look for an idol clue around the reward site in front of everyone. The rest of the tribe notices her looking, but Shane reveals she is actually doing this on purpose in the hopes her tribe thinks she's joking around and to not take her seriously. Shane is hoping that this will throw them off as she believes her tribe does underestimate her. Interestingly, Shane does find the idol underneath the barrel of ice, but everyone sees her tuck something into her shorts. Shane is happy that she found the idol, but has to tell her tribe something and decides to state that she only found an idol clue.: Immunity challenge: Two members of each tribe will be locked in two cages. They will then need to maneuver through an obstacle course. Once both caged members are across the course and free, they will then hurl coconuts at three glass targets. The first tribe to break all of their glass targets wins. (Contenders Win); Back at camp, the Champions believe that Jackie and Shane slowed the tribe down in the challenge and debate which one they should vote out. Moana actually sat out of the challenge, but Mat believes that Moana could have contributed more than Shane or Jackie. Jackie tries to put the target on Moana because her illness is a liability to the tribe. However, the tribe also believes that Shane has the idol and they want to force her to play it. The rest of the tribe gets together and organizes a plan to split the vote between Jackie and Shane. That way, if Shane plays the idol, then Jackie leaves and the tribe can move forward together as a stronger tribe. At Tribal Council, the tribe discusses keeping the tribe strong and Jackie and Shane campaign for their tribe to keep them. During Tribal, Sam calls out Shane for having an idol and that the goal of this Tribal is to keep the tribe strong and maybe flush an idol. Suddenly, Moana informs Jonathan that her illness is bringing her down and she worries that it will bring her tribe down. Moana doesn't believe she's going to get better and tells Jonathan that she wants to take herself out of the game to keep the Champions strong and to prevent a vote because she knows her tribe doesn't want to vote her out. Sharn and Mat try to talk Moana out of quitting and asks her to let the tribe vote. Jonathan states that it is ultimately Moana's decision and Moana decides to leave it up to a vote. After the tribe votes, Shane plays her idol on herself. However, the only person that voted for Shane was Moana. The rest of the tribe decides to honor Moana's decision to leave and unanimously vote her out.
85	7	"Episode 7"	Days 17-18	13 August 2018
At Contenders, Heath and Tegan feel very solid with their alliance and position in the tribe. However, Benji has observed that Heath and Tegan are playing the middle and he believes they feel like the king and queen of the tribe. Benji approaches Shonee in an effort to convince her to work with him moving forward. Benji believes that if he convinces Shonee to join his side, then Anita and Fenella will also join. Zach is also feeling vulnerable because he has not gotten along with the women, they have the majority, and they want him out. Zach has been looking for an idol to save himself. However, Heath ends up coming across a clue hidden in the tribe's flag and discovers that there's an idol hidden under the flag. Heath is able to dig up the idol and claim it for himself. At Champions, the tribe is upset about losing Moana. Sharn is feeling low because she had a close bond with Moana, but she realized she needed to make a compassionate vote to send Moana home. However, Sharn is determined to continue building her story and hopes to utilize her lawyer skills to get to the end and make an impassioned speech to the Jury.: Immunity challenge: Three members from each tribe will attempt to secure a ball in the water. Once they have the ball, they will need to pass it to a fourth member, who will attempt to score a point using a slingshot. The first tribe to score three points wins. (Champions Win); Back at Contenders, Tegan proposes to Paige and Anita that it is time for Zach to leave because she's tired of his disrespectful behavior towards the women. Tegan believes that the women will be united on this vote and she feels she's in a good position in the game. However, Benji and Robbie tell Shonee and Fenella that Tegan approached them about getting rid of Anita tonight and they ask the girls to join them in voting out Tegan. Fenella tells Anita what Benji and Robbie told her and Anita is upset to hear this. Tegan and Heath believe that once Zach leaves, they will be in a perfect position to play the middle moving forward. At Tribal Council, the tribe discusses how the social game rules Survivor and they note how some people do well in the social game while others don't. Tegan remarks that she is trying to play as honest and true to herself as possible. Zach remarks that he tried that same strategy, but he ended up offending people with his honesty. Jonathan then reveals that this Tribal Council will be different. Jonathan states that whoever is voted out tonight will not go home, but will instead go to Exile Beach. Then, at the next Tribal Council, whoever is voted out will compete against the other player in a duel and the winner will return to the game while the loser will go home. Everyone is rocked by the revelation and discuss what would be best for the tribe. When the votes are cast, it is revealed that the two alliances of Zach, Benji, Robbie and Anita, Shonee, Fenella have joined forces to blindside Tegan. Tegan is sent to Exile Island to await her duel.
86	8	"Episode 8"	Days 19-20	14 August 2018
While on Exile Beach, Tegan is feeling stunned and upset that her tribe voted her out, but she is determined to fight and get back into the game. On Contenders, Heath is upset that the tribe voted out Tegan. Benji is thrilled that his plan to vote out Tegan worked and he plans to send Heath to Exile Beach if the Contenders lose again to ensure that Heath and Tegan will be split up when one of them goes home. However, Heath is determined to ruin the tribe's plans with the idol he found as he vowed to take Tegan to the end and he plans to stick with that promise.: Reward challenge: Three castaways from each tribe will be tethered together on a track and weighted down with sandbags. Their goal is to attempt to touch the other tribe to score a point. At any time, tribe members can pass their sandbag to someone else, but no one can drop out. The first tribe to score three points wins. The winning tribe will receive care packages from their families. (Champions Win); The Champions are thrilled to receive the care packages. Brian receives his daughter's stuffed bunny toy, Mat takes a moment to reflect on losing his parents at a young age, and Monika receives a stuffed bear with a recorded message from her husband.: Immunity challenge: Castaways must hold heavy sandbags tethered to water-filled troughs above their head. A person can drop out of the challenge but must hand over their bag to someone else. The last tribe to stay dry wins. (Champions Win); Back at camp, Heath attempts to save himself by campaigning to get Anita voted out as the weakest member of the tribe. Heath is also hoping that Tegan would easily be able to beat Anita and return to the game tomorrow. However, Benji is determined to make sure Heath and Tegan are split up for good and talks with the tribe to ensure that Heath will leave. However, Fenella is not too sure that Heath is the right move and asks the girls to vote out Zach instead as he is difficult to get along with and she worries how he will interact with the Champions at the merge. Anita refuses to change gears as she knows Heath voted for her at the last Tribal Council and she can no longer trust him. At Tribal Council, the tribe discusses the fact that they have not won a single Reward Challenge as a tribe, the issues between making decisions based on tribe strength versus personal feelings, and the impact of the Exile Beach twist. After the voting takes place, Heath plays his Hidden Immunity Idol for himself. It is revealed that everyone else on the tribe did vote for Heath. Therefore, Heath's lone vote for Anita is enough to send her to Exile Beach. Anita goes to Exile Beach to compete against Tegan in a duel to decide which one returns to the game.
87	9	"Episode 9"	Days 21-22	20 August 2018
When Anita arrives on Exile Beach, she and Tegan begin to talk about what happened back at camp and why Tegan was voted out. While the conversation is at first combative, the tone changes once Anita tells Tegan about Benji approaching Shonee and telling her that Tegan wanted to vote Anita out. Tegan states that this is a flat out lie and Anita starts to believe that Benji did lie to the women and expresses regret for voting Tegan out. Both women are determined to get back into the game to get their revenge.: Exile Duel: While a ball is rolling on a ramp, castaways will have to build a tower using blocks. If at any time they do not catch the ball and it knocks over their tower, they will have to start over. The first castaway to finish their tower using all of their blocks wins.; Tegan defeated Anita, returning to the Champions tribe and eliminating Anita from the game. Back at camp, Tegan reunites with Heath, but feels uncomfortable being back on the tribe. The tribe sits down to discuss everything that happened. Zach states that he voted out Tegan because he knew Tegan wanted to vote him out. However, Shonee recalls Benji telling her that Tegan wanted to vote out Anita which is why the six of them banded together to vote Tegan out. Benji believes that Tegan has exposed his game and knows he has to do damage control. Tegan tells Heath about what she learned from Anita about Benji lying to the women and both believe they need to start playing aggressive if they want to stay in the game.: Immunity challenge: Six castaways from each tribe will go up a water slide to fill a leaky bucket with water. They will slide back down and dump any remaining water in a tube. Once the tube is full, a ball will be released. The final two members will then use the ball to navigate a vertical maze. The first tribe to get their ball in the goal wins. (Champions Win); Back at camp, Tegan is feeling vulnerable and hopes to paint the target on Benji for lying to the women. Tegan tells the other women that the reason she was voted out was because Benji lied to the girls about her wanting to vote out Anita when she was never going to. Benji states that he did not make this up and notes that Heath had specifically said they were targeting Anita. Heath and Tegan insist this was a lie. Benji tells Fenella and Shonee that the only people he has ever lied to in the game were Tegan and Paige. Both Benji and Tegan compete to get Fenella and Shonee's trust, with Benji hoping they can just vote Tegan out again and Tegan hoping that they can go back to being a strong women's alliance. Tegan wants to see Benji voted out, but Shonee and Fenella state that they will not vote Benji out. However, they do express interest in voting out Zach given his behavior towards the women in the past and their concern about how he will behave after the merge. Zach tells Robbie that he doesn't see this tribe winning anymore challenges. Shonee is feeling conflicted about the vote going into Tribal Council. At Tribal Council, the tribe discusses the events that lead to Tegan being voted out and the conversations that happened back at camp. Tegan expresses to the tribe that Benji purposefully made up a lie that she was targeting Anita and this was not true. As a result, Tegan was voted out two Tribals ago. Shonee states that Tegan's recollection is true as Benji and Robbie did pull her and Fenella aside to tell them that Anita was going home that night, Tegan and Heath were orchestrating it, and they voted Tegan out to prevent Anita from leaving. Tegan accuses Benji of creating that plan on his own. However, Benji states that he did not make up a lie and was just going along with a group consensus as Zach was aware Tegan wanted to vote him out. Zach remarks that Tegan is focusing so much on one lie when everyone is lying in the game and he accuses Tegan of lying to him about coming after him. Tegan states that she never talked to Zach before that vote so she didn't lie to him. Zach tells everyone that he's one of the strongest guys, they need to win challenges, and he knows that his name is still being thrown around. Zach believes the reason they have lost the challenges is because the women on the Champions are overpowering the women on Contenders. Tegan doesn't believe that is true at all, stating that the men have suffered their own losses and she believes the tribe can still win without Zach. When the votes are cast, the vote is unanimous against Zach with even Benji and Robbie joining the tribe stating that Zach's usefulness as a shield has worn itself out and the women can no longer tolerate his behavior, sending Zach home
88	10	"Episode 10"	Days 23-24	21 August 2018
At Champions, Jackie believes that she's set up tight bonds with Monika, Brian, and Shane in the game. Brian is put off by Steve's philosophical speeches in camp, so Jackie is hoping that she can get her alliance to blindside Mat or Steve at the next Tribal. Mat observes that Jackie is playing a strategic game and reeling in Monika, so Mat sits down with Monika with the hope of reestablishing a bond with her. Mat states that he has a close alliance with Steve, Sharn, and Sam, so with Monika on their side, their group would have the numbers. At Contenders, Fenella and Shonee are happy that Zach is finally gone as he caused friction in camp and was constantly offending the women with his comments. The Contenders receive a note that there is a treasure buried at their campsite. The tribe follows the map, digs up the chest, and discovers that they have been given their family care packages that they didn't win at a previous reward challenge. The tribe is overcome with emotion receiving these gifts from their family and hope to use the gifts as motivation to pull together and win.: Reward challenge: One by one, tribe members will jump off a floating tower to grab a piece of rope. They will then swim over to a ramp, where they will use the pieces of rope to balance all seven members. The first tribe to get all seven members balanced on both sides of the ramp wins. The winning tribe will receive a meal of nachos and margaritas. (Contenders Win).; During the Challenge, Monika misses the key on the jump, twice, allowing the Contenders to pull ahead and, finally, win their first Reward Challenge. Back at Champions, Monika is feeling upset with her performance in the challenge. However, the tribe encourages her and praises her for never giving up during the challenge. Monika reflects and realizes that she does deserve to be on the Champions as she never gave up and knows she will give it her all. When the Contenders arrive at the Reward Challenge, they discover that the nachos reward is family style and they will have to go into the reward site one at a time to enjoy the reward in private. As the tribe discusses who should go first, Tegan volunteers and believes the women should go first as they won't eat as much. However, Tegan really wants to take the opportunity to look for an idol clue to keep herself safe. Tegan looks around the reward site, but does not find a clue. Fenella, Shonee, and Paige all take their turns without searching extensively for an idol. Benji goes next. Benji is also intent on looking for an idol clue. While eating the nachos, he is able to see that the wooden plate has an idol clue carved into it. Benji believes that he knows where the idol is located and places a napkin over the plate with the hopes that nobody else finds the clue. Heath and Robbie both enjoy their reward without discovering the clue. Benji believes that the idol is located on the smaller island right across from their island, but he cannot go get it because he would be spotted by everyone.: Immunity challenge: One man and one woman from each tribe will hold up a net. The remaining members will then attempt to fill the other tribe's nets with coconuts to make them heavier. The last person standing wins for their tribe. (Champions Win); Heath and Fenella hold the baskets for the Contenders and Steve and Lydia hold the baskets for the Champions. Heath is the first to drop his basket with Steve dropping soon after. It is a battle between Fenella and Lydia, but Fenella drops first. Champions Win Immunity. Back at camp, the Contenders are truly devastated that they have to vote out yet another person. Benji is concerned about his position in the game as Tegan had previously called him out as a liar at the last Tribal Council. Benji has conversations with Shonee, Heath, and Tegan asking them to unite and vote Paige out believing her to be the weakest in challenges and he has concerns about whether Paige will stay loyal after the merge given that the tribe tried to vote her out before. Shonee agrees with several of Benji's points, believing that Paige has constantly floated from alliance to alliance and nobody really knows who she is aligned with in the game. In order to build trust with Shonee, Benji decides to share with her that he is not a graphic designer, but he actually runs a million dollar company, he doesn't need the money, and tells her that he just hopes to make the Final 6. Shonee is shocked by this revelation and believes that maybe Benji should be voted out because he doesn't need the money and Shonee believes that Benji knows the game better than he's letting on. Shonee tells Fenella about Benji's revelation and both wonder if they should vote out Benji or Paige. Benji and Robbie also talk with Heath and Tegan in an attempt to mend fences and to convince them to join a four person alliance to the end. At the same time, Paige does approach Tegan to convince her to get rid of Benji as Benji has been the brains behind the last few votes. Tegan is also on the fence about the vote because she is willing to work with Benji to keep herself safe, but she also knows that Benji is playing a strong game. The tribe goes into Tribal questioning what they are going to do. At Tribal Council, the tribe discusses the relationships they have built in the game, that most people on the tribe are part of pairs, and whether they can continue to work with people who have lied to them before. Tegan, Heath, and Paige all note that people on this tribe have lied to them before, but they all know that in order to progress in the game you do have to work with people who have lied to you and holding grudges would just make it impossible to work with anyone in the game. Benji remarks that it's almost impossible to shake the reputation of being a liar in the game, but he agrees with the consensus and he states that he has ninety-five percent confidence that the promises he has made tonight will be kept. When the tribe votes, Paige votes for Benji, but the remainder of the tribe bands together to get rid of Paige.
89	11	"Episode 11"	Days 25-26	27 August 2018
On Day 25, both tribes believe they have it figured out. On Champions, there appears to be a tight alliance between Lydia, Mat, Monika, Sam, Sharn, and Steve. On Contenders, there remains three pairs of Benji/Robbie, Tegan/Heath, and Shonee/Fenella. However, the tribes are informed by Jonathan to drop their buffs as they are switching tribes. The new tribes are as follows: New Contenders: Benji, Fenella, Heath, Lydia, Monika, Robbie, and Sharn New Champions: Brian, Jackie, Mat, Sam, Shane, Shonee, and Tegan At New Contenders, Sharn, Lydia, and Monika believe they are on the bottom. However, Robbie is actually happy that the tribe received the three women from Champions. Lydia is hoping to prove herself to her new tribe by performing well in the challenges and approaches Robbie and Benji about an alliance to protect the strong physical threats at the merge so the less athletic cannot band together to vote them out. At New Champions, Tegan and Shonee also believe they are on the bottom of the tribe. Tegan was particularly devastated at the time of the swap and believes that she cannot catch a break in this game. However, the new swap has also left Mat worried as he's lost three of his allies and he is concerned that Jackie and Brian might try to flip the game on him as they were clearly on the bottom of the Champions before the swap and he has never made an alliance with Shane. Jackie is looking for new opportunities in this tribe swap and believes she might have numbers to make moves. Jackie decides to start planting seeds in Tegan and lies to her stating that the tribe discussed throwing a challenge to get rid of her and Shonee to keep the Champions numbers strong at the merge.: Immunity challenge: Three pairs of two will hold a cube up using only their feet. If at any point a pair's cube falls, they're out of the challenge. The last pair remaining wins for their tribe. (Contenders Win); Back at Champions, the Champions get together and decide that they will split the vote between Shonee and Tegan. However, Tegan and Shonee are not looking to give up. Tegan approaches Mat and tells him about the conversation she had with Jackie where Jackie told her the Champions would throw a challenge to get rid of them. Mat is furious that Jackie would lie like that because he never said this and he believes he can no longer trust Jackie at all. Mat speaks with Steve and Sam about possibly using Shonee and Tegan to get rid of Jackie as she is clearly playing a strong, strategic game and Mat believes Jackie will come after him. Mat believes that if Jackie and Brian are split up, then Mat can pull the Champions together and get rid of Shonee or Tegan next time. While Jackie is concerned about whether she can trust Mat, she does want to keep the Champions strong to the merge. Jackie and Brian are concerned with how much Tegan has been talking with Mat. Jackie believes that it would be best to get rid of Tegan and speaks with Shonee about voting for Tegan to save herself. Both Jackie and Mat speak with Shane about the vote. Shane has found herself in the middle as she can stick with Brian and Jackie to vote out Tegan or she can join with Mat and Steve to get rid of Jackie. At Tribal, the tribe discusses how the swap has affected them physically as they lost some good competitors and how Tegan and Shonee are feeling like they are on the bottom. Shonee and Tegan express that they have done the best they can to establish connections with the Champions and hope it is enough. When asked about the vote, all of the Champions state that their goal is to keep as many Champions as possible in the game for the merge. When the votes are cast, Tegan and Shonee voted for Brian, Jackie and Brian cast votes for Shonee and Tegan, but is revealed that Shane has turned on her allies and joined Mat, Sam, and Steve to blindside Jackie.
90	12	"Episode 12"	Days 27-28	28 August 2018
On Contenders, Benji and Robbie feel like they are in a good position in the game. Sharn is still concerned about being on the bottom of the tribe so she approaches Benji to create an alliance together. Both players believe they have good connections in the game and if they support each other they think they can go a long way. On Champions, Mat, Sam, and Steve are relieved to have gotten rid of Jackie, but they are concerned about how Brian is feeling since they left him out of the loop. Mat has had concerns about whether he can trust Brian, but Mat wants to keep him around so that there are more Champions in the merge. Brian is feeling vulnerable after the vote last night and tries to keep himself in the game by acting as the comedic relief. Brian wears Jackie's clothes to brighten up the mood of the tribe. In order to prevent being blindsided, Mat proposes to Shane that she acts as a double agent for their alliance. Mat notes that people think Shane is easy to manipulate, but Mat finds Shane to be smart and could be a good source of information. Shane is willing to be a double agent and believes that this is actually going to help her game a lot.: Reward challenge: On one-on-one match-ups, castaways will hold onto a rope at a steep angle over the water. The last person left standing scores a point for their tribe. First tribe to score three points wins a Sunday roast with pork, chicken, veggies, and wine. (Contenders Win); During the Reward, the Contenders are impressed with Lydia's athletic background and her intelligence. Lydia believes that she has actually found her place in the new Contenders tribe. Later that night, Benji decides that it would be a good time for him to go get the idol from the other island. Benji crosses the ocean to the other island and is able to find the idol hidden in the ledge over the ocean.: Immunity challenge: Two members of each tribe will have to transport a set of eight tires across a set of monkey bars. Next four castaways will put the tires on a cart. The final member of the tribe will then use it to transport the tribe, two at a time, across an obstacle course. Once across the course, they will disassemble the cart and use the eight tires to solve a puzzle so they can raise a flag. The first tribe to raise their flag wins. (Contenders Win); After the Immunity Challenge, Jonathan hands a note to the Contenders and tells them that they will be attending the Champions' Tribal Council this evening. Back at camp, there is an initial consensus by the Champions, again, to split the vote between Shonee and Tegan. Sam even tells Tegan and Shonee that this is the plan so they will not feel blindsided. However, Brian is still feeling concerned about his position after the last vote and speaks with Tegan about aligning with her to get rid of Mat and Steve. Brian also proposes to Shane that they consider working with Shonee and Tegan. However, Tegan doesn't trust Brian and informs Mat that Brian has approached her and Shonee to get rid of him tonight. Shonee and Tegan also approach Shane to convince her to join forces with them and get rid of Brian because he's proven himself to be untrustworthy. Shane realizes that she is again a swing vote tonight. Shane also decides to tell Mat and Steve about Brian approaching her to vote out one of them tonight. This causes Mat and Steve to consider blindsiding Brian tonight because they haven't been able to fully trust him and this proves he is working against them. At Tribal Council, the Champions express to Jonathan and the Contenders that their goal is to stay Champions Strong and that Tegan or Shonee will be leaving tonight. Tegan and Shonee discuss Brian approaching them to work against the Champions and attempt to convince Brian that maybe he should do something tonight because he's on the bottom of the Champions. Brian states that he was concerned after the last Tribal because he got votes against him and he was attempting to keep his options open. However, Brian insists that he is staying strong with the Champions. Sam states that they didn't share this information with Brian because the goal was to get rid of Jackie and they didn't want her to hear this information. Tegan argues that if you're not getting information, then you're on the bottom and she doesn't believe Brian's position will improve if he does nothing tonight. After the votes are read, while Shonee and Tegan voted for Brian, the remaining Champions stuck together and split the vote. Tegan received three of these votes, which is enough to eliminate her. However, before Tegan can leave, Jonathan reveals there is a twist. The Contenders open their note and find out that they've been given the power tonight to either Save Tegan or Send Tegan home for good. The Contenders will vote one at a time to either Save Tegan or Send Tegan home. Tegan pleads with her former contenders, Benji, Robbie, Heath, and Fenella, to save her because the Champions have made it clear they are sticking together and they need as many Contenders as possible to stay. While Heath and Fenella immediately agree, Benji and Robbie are on the fence. While the voting takes place, there are discussions among the Contenders on what they should do. When the votes are revealed, Heath and Fenella chose to save Tegan, but Benji and Robbie have decided that they cannot trust Tegan given that they previously voted her out. Robbie and Benji join the Champion Women in sending Tegan home. As a result, Tegan becomes the eleventh person voted off Australian Survivor.
91	13	"Episode 13"	Days 29-30	3 September 2018
On Champions, Mat, Brian, and Steve are able to use a bonfire to get honey from a bees nest. Shonee is having a difficult time living with the Champions because she knows she's on the bottom and she finds that she has nothing in common with them. On Contenders, Benji and Robbie acknowledge that they got rid of Tegan because she was a strategic threat and they could not trust her given their history. However, Heath and Fenella are angry that Benji and Robbie would vote Tegan out and find this move to be selfish and a huge mistake. Heath and Fenella are aware that they are on the bottom of the tribe as Benji and Robbie would rather work with Sharn, Lydia, and Monika. Fenella attempts to see if the women would work with her and Heath to go girls strong to the end and try to convince them that Benji and Robbie would turn on them if it benefited their game.: Immunity challenge: Two members from each tribe will use a rope to drag two heavy metal boxes containing sandbags across the sand. Two more members will then use the sandbags to knock off blocks on a perch. The last two members will use the blocks to spell out a phrase. The first tribe to spell out "EVERY CHAMPION WAS ONCE A CONTENDER" wins. (Champions Win); Back at Contenders, Benji and Robbie propose to Sharn, Lydia, and Monika that they vote Heath out as he will be a physical threat at the merge. Sharn has promised Benji and Robbie that they can align with Mat, Steve, and Sam at the merge. Later, Heath pitches to Sharn, Lydia, and Monika that they get rid of Robbie. Heath states that he is a free agent in this game and pledges his loyalty if they will keep him. Sharn and Monika consider this and Fenella again talks to Monika and Sharn about an all women's alliance after the merge. Heath also pitches to Robbie a plan to get rid of Monika because she was throwing his name around and proposes that the four Contenders get together and stay united for the merge. At Tribal, the tribe discusses what qualities they look for in players at the merge and what they would be concerned about like physical strength in challenges. Heath states that after watching the Champions' last Tribal, he is convinced that Mat and Steve are running the Champions tribe and people might want to think about the Champions reuniting after the merge. After the votes are read, the Sharn, Lydia, and Monika decide to place their trust in Benji and Robbie, as well as Benji and Robbie placing their trust in the Champion Women. While Heath and Fenella voted for Robbie, the remaining members cast their votes against Heath, sending Heath out of the game.
92	14	"Episode 14"	Days 31-32	4 September 2018
On Day 31, the Champions and Contenders finally merge into one tribe called Koro Savu. They immediate take part in the Survivor Auction.: Survivor Auction: Each of the castaways was given $500 to bid for items presented by Jonathan. Bidding was in $20 increments with no sharing of money or items permitted unless otherwise told.; During the auction, Shane purchases a note that buys herself out of the auction, but she wins a seat at the Beggar's table meaning that she can receive portions of any item purchased if the contestants are kind enough to share. Thankfully, for Shane, everyone is willing to share. Sam wins a glass of chocolate milk, Fenella wins poached eggs and tomato on toast. Sharn wins a pavlova. Benji gets a cheeseburger, and Brian wins a bowl of rice and a bed to sleep in for three days. Shonee is able to win a jar of sweets and she notices that there is a piece of paper inside which excites her. Back at the merged camp, Shonee and Fenella are happy to have reunited but are feeling the most vulnerable because they feel they have the least connections available in the game. Benji and Robbie speak with Mat about Sharn and Lydia's promise to join the Champions alliance at the merge. However, Mat privately states that he has no interest in aligning with any of the Contenders and goes to speak with Sharn about this promise. Sharn states that she only made this promise in order to survive on the Contenders tribe, which Mat completely accepts. The Champions' intentions are to stay eight strong and vote out the remaining four Contenders, with Lydia proposing that Fenella go first because she has no connections. However, Mat is still concerned about Brian's loyalty and he talks with him to ensure Brian is still onboard. Sam is also concerned about Lydia's position because she's a physical threat in the challenges and promises to look after her. Shonee takes a moment to read her note which is an advantage that allows her to steal someone else's vote at a future Tribal Council and she will be allowed to vote twice.: Immunity challenge: Castaways will have to hold onto a pole. At regular intervals, they will move down the pole, where the foothold will get smaller. Castaways can only have their feet within the allotted zones. If at any point they touch the ground, they're out. The last person left standing wins.; At the start of the challenge, Shane drops out early stating that she wants to conserve her energy for a challenge she can win. After Monika and Brian tap out, Shane proposes to the two of them that they should consider blindsiding Lydia tonight as Lydia is performing well in this challenge and she will be a physical threat down the road. Once Mat and Steve are eliminated, Shane proposes this plan to them and agree with her reasoning. The challenge does end up coming down to Lydia versus Sharn. In the end, Lydia slips off the pole which means Sharn wins Immunity. After returning to camp, Mat and Shane speak to the other Champions, as well as Shonee and Fenella, about blindsiding Lydia. Benji and Robbie are told by Sharn, Lydia, and Monika that they will be voting Fenella out and Benji and Robbie agree with this plan. When Mat speaks with Sam and Sharn about the plan to blindside Lydia, neither are very supportive of this. Sam believes that it is too early to start eliminating their own Champions tribe and Sharn feels that she has made such a good bond with Lydia. Sam also doesn't appreciate Mat's assertive behavior on the vote. At Tribal, the tribe discusses the bonds that they have created in the game and whether old Tribal lines will prevail or break apart. The Contenders are very much aware they are outnumbered, but some people tease that Champions versus Contenders might not exist in the individual game. The tribe discusses Sharn and Lydia's performances during the Challenge as well as Shane's decision to drop out early. Shane argues that there are other important aspects of the game besides winning challenges and she felt her time was best spent sitting on the sidelines than competing. When the votes are cast, Benji, Robbie, and Lydia have voted for Fenella. However, Sam and Sharn have decided to go along with blindsiding Lydia for fear of drawing negative attention if they do not, and send her out of the game.
93	15	"Episode 15"	Day 33	10 September 2018
On Day 33, Benji and Robbie are shocked that Lydia has been eliminated and they feel on the outs because they were not included in the vote. Benji and Robbie believe that Mat is in complete control of the Champions, he is calling on the shots, and they hope to be able to convince some of the Champions to turn on him. However, not everyone in the Champions is happy that Lydia left. Sharn is very upset that she wasn't told until the last minute that Lydia was leaving. Mat is also concerned that Lydia's elimination might expose some vulnerabilities in the Champions alliance and Mat believes it is best to get rid of a Contender next. Mat proposes to the Champions that Robbie should leave next because he's the biggest challenge threat left from the Contenders. Later that day, the tribe is given a note and told to send one person to make a decision on behalf of everyone. The tribe chooses Sharn and she is presented with a moral dilemma. Sharn can either take a large bag of vegetables back for the tribe to eat or she can take a smaller bag of vegetables but will receive an advantage in the next Immunity Challenge. Sharn decides to take the smaller bag and the advantage. When Sharn returns to camp, she tells everyone that it was a moral dilemma but lies and says the dilemma was between the vegetables and chocolate biscuits for herself. Sam believes that Sharn is lying and is very concerned that Sharn is not sharing any details with the Champions alliance. Sharn is keeping her options open and is hoping to be able to keep Benji around as she knows she has built trust with him. Sharn hopes to use the advantage to win Immunity so they can get rid of Robbie and for her to keep Benji safe.: Immunity challenge: Castaways will have to hold a disc weighted down with a sandbag, that is proportional to their body weight, between their palms. If they drop the disc, they are out of the challenge. The last person left standing wins.; Sharn's advantage is that her sandbag will contain half of the weight that everyone else's will have. This proves to work to her advantage as Sharn is able to win her second Immunity Challenge in a row. Back at camp, the Champions agree to split the vote between Benji and Robbie. Mat decides to tell Robbie that it is going to be him tonight out of respect. However, Robbie is not looking to give up. Robbie and Benji begin to talk with Monika, Shonee, Fenella, and Sam to see if they would be willing to flip the vote on Mat. Everyone is considering their options, particularly Sam. Sam shares with the Contenders that he doesn't feel his allies value his input as he advocated for Lydia not to be voted out first and his allies didn't listen. Sam knows that he will need to make a move on Mat, eventually, because Mat is poised to win the game and he knows he won't be able to beat him. Before Tribal, Mat does talk with Benji and tells him that he is interested in working with him as Sharn has advocated for Benji. Mat tells Benji that if he votes for Robbie, tonight, then it will show Mat that he can be trusted. Benji is doing everything he can to save Robbie, but considers that he might have to vote out his friend in order to advance in the game. At Tribal Council, it is revealed that the Jury phase begins tonight and the tribe discusses the importance of not only getting to the end, but earning the Jury's respect at the end. The tribe talks about the trust they've built and Sam gives input on when it pays off to be disloyal. In a last effort to save himself, Robbie proposes that tonight is an opportunity to flip on the power players and asks that anyone he spoke to today about another plan should really consider following through with that plan tonight. When the votes are revealed, Robbie voted for Mat, Shane threw a vote towards Benji, but the remaining members of the tribe, Benji included, stick with their plan of voting Robbie out as the biggest physical Contender threat left. Robbie becomes the fourteenth person voted out and the first member of the jury.
94	16	"Episode 16"	Days 34-35	11 September 2018
The next morning, the tribe celebrates Steve's forty-second birthday. It also turns out to be Mat's son's birthday and he writes a message in the sand as a birthday wish to his son.: Reward challenge: Castaways will have to race out to grab an idol. The catch is there is one less idol than the number of castaways per round and the person who does not grab an idol is eliminated. This process will repeat until two remain in the challenge, where a final heat held. For the final heat, the first person to grab the idol and return to the start line wins. The winner will receive a day at the spa.; The competition comes down to Benji and Mat. In the end, Mat wins Reward. He is given the choice to bring two people along and he chooses Fenella and Sharn. On the Reward, Mat and Sharn do propose to Fenella that she continues working with them and that they create a sub-alliance now. Fenella believes that Mat merely sees her as a number, but she also knows she has to keep her options open. After the Reward, Mat brings back a basket of hygiene supplies to give out to the tribe. Later, Benji acknowledges that he voted Robbie out in order to pretend to create trust with Mat. Benji believes that the best way to take Mat out is to get in close and blindside him when he least expects it. Benji does approach Sam to see if he will blindside Mat at the next Tribal Council. Sam is considering making the move against Mat this round because he feels that he is on the bottom of the Champions alliance. Sam, Benji, Shonee, and Fenella talk about voting Mat out next. Sam pulls Monika aside to see if she will join in, but Monika is put off by Sam's tone and finds that he's acting very paranoid.: Immunity challenge: The players must swim under a steel grate and stay above the water. As the tide rises, the players will run out of breathing room. If the fear of drowning is too much, that person can bail out. The last person still under the grate wins the challenge. (Mat Wins); With Mat winning Immunity, the former Contenders and Sam discuss voting Steve out since he's close with Mat. Sam begins to play both sides, plotting with the Contenders and then speaking with Mat to assure him he is still on his side. However, word has gotten back to Mat that Sam was speaking strategy with the Contenders. Sam states that the only time he went against Mat was when he told Lydia that the Champions were thinking of voting her out and warned her to not assert herself in challenges. When Mat hears this, he feels very betrayed that Sam did this. Given Sam's revelation, Mat believes that he can no longer trust Sam and proposes to the Champions that they vote Sam out tonight. Mat also informs Benji that the vote is going towards Sam in an effort to continue the trust they've established. Benji does consider going along with Mat again because the numbers might not be there for a blindside. Later that day, Sam tells Mat that Benji informed him that Sam might be voted out. Mat is again angered that someone else has betrayed his trust. Mat is conflicted on whether to vote out Benji or Sam because Benji has been consistently plotting with everyone while Sam has been giving away too much information to the Contenders. At Tribal, Sam does reveal that he's on the chopping block and airs his grievances about the Lydia vote and how he felt upset that Lydia was the first to go. Sam also admits to telling Lydia about the Champions wanting to vote her out. Steve brings up the fact that his name was brought up as someone to be voted out and Mat notes that he was very hurt by Sam's revelation. Sam pleads with his alliance not to vote him out as he has consistently voted with the Champions and argues that his attempts to help Lydia was actually an attempt to stay loyal to his Champions alliance. After the votes are cast, Sam and Fenella are revealed to have voted for Benji, but the remaining Champions plus Benji and Shonee believe that Sam can no longer be trusted and cast their votes for him. Sam becomes the fifteenth person voted out and the second member of the Jury.
95	17	"Episode 17"	Days 36-37	17 September 2018
The next morning, Benji, Shonee, and Fenella all agree that they need to make a move against Mat now or they will never get a chance. The three attempt to get Brian and Monika to join with their alliance to blindside Mat, but both still want to stick with the Champions. Mat sees Brian getting closer to Shonee and Fenella as he is always making them laugh with his stories and Mat concludes that Brian should be next to leave as he has never really had trust in him. Sharn reveals to Benji that the Champions are going to vote Brian out next. Benji, Shonee, and Fenella approach Brian and Monika again with the revelation that Brian will be voted out next. Benji also tells Brian and Monika that Mat asked him to spy on the two of them. After hearing this information, Brian now knows that it is time to make his move against Mat. Benji states that Mat has been running the game ever since the merge and he is ready to unseat him. While walking out to the watering well, Sharn spots a piece of paper behind the lid. The paper is an idol clue which reveals that an idol will be hidden at the next Immunity Challenge underneath the orange table. Sharn sees this as a great opportunity to get power in the game.: Immunity challenge: In the first stage, castaways will have to dig under a log. The first six to finish move on. In the second stage, castaways will have to complete a puzzle. The first three to finish move on. In the final stage, castaways will have to use a cue to get three balls into three slots on a snooker table. The first person to get all three in wins.; Benji wins Immunity. After the Challenge, Sharn does grab the idol from under the table. Unfortunately, as she is walking back to the group, the idol falls out from her pants and everyone sees it. Back at camp, Mat, Sharn, Shane, and Steve all agree to vote Brian out next. Mat shares this with Monika, Benji, Shonee, and Fenella to get everyone onboard with the plan. Mat believes that once Brian is gone, the remaining five Champions will be an unbreakable, loyal force that can pick off the rest of the Contenders. Benji, Shonee, Fenella, Brian, and Monika appear ready to blindside Mat at the next Tribal Council. However, the group is concerned about Sharn's idol because she might decide to play it just to get rid of it as everyone knows she has it. Benji knows the worst case scenario would be for Sharn to play the idol on Mat. Benji decides to tell Sharn that people are considering to throw votes at her in an effort to scare Sharn into playing the idol for herself. Benji also hints at a blindside happening tonight. Sharn debates whether or not she should tell Mat about Benji's plans and also debates whether to play the idol for herself or Mat. Sharn is frustrated that she couldn't keep the idol a secret as it fell out of her pants. At Tribal, Mat discusses the fact that a strong alliance exists on the tribe, but that talking too much or giving away information can make people a target. The tribe also discusses the fact that an alliance cannot last forever as only one person will win. The tribe also discusses Sharn dropping the idol in front of everyone and whether it is in Sharn's best interest to play it as keeping it might make her more of a target. The voting takes place. After the voting, Sharn decides to play her idol. Initially, she states she wants to play the idol for Mat. However, Benji vocalizes to Sharn that the vote is split and if Sharn doesn't play it for herself, then it'll result in a tie. Sharn debates on what she should do and ultimately decides to play the idol on herself. Interestingly, with all the commotion, Mat decides not to play his own idol. When the votes are revealed, Mat, Sharn, Shane, and Steve vote for Brian, but Brian, Benji, Monika, Shonee, and Fenella have followed through on their plan to blindside Mat. Mat becomes the sixteenth person voted out and the third member of the Jury.
96	18	"Episode 18"	Days 38-39	18 September 2018
After Tribal, Benji celebrates his orchestrated blindside against Mat and states that he is now the New Godfather of the tribe. Steve, Sharn, and Shane are feeling completely blindsided and angry that Mat was voted out and that Monika and Brian turned on them. In an act of revenge, Shane puts the fire out that night. Sharn is feeling incredibly vulnerable and upset that Benji got in her head and feels like she is the next person out. Sharn does attempt to approach Brian to see if he will come back to the Champions, but Brian notes that they voted for him and it is hard for him to trust the Champions now.: Reward challenge: Divided into two teams of four, the castaways will pull a handle to release a ball into the water. They will then need to jump into the water from a high platform to get their ball. Once they have their ball, they will then attempt to shoot it into a basket. The first person to get their ball into their team's basket earns a point. The first team to three points wins.; Shane and Benji are the team captains and choose their teams. The team of Brian, Monika, Shane, and Sharn wins Reward. Shane reveals that she picked the people she did to try and organize a blindside against Benji. Sharn and Shane try to convince Brian and Monika that it would be best to take Benji out of the game because he's been a major strategist. Sharn and Shane also argue that Brian and Monika would be on the outs of their new alliance as Benji will likely take Shonee and Fenella to the end. While on the Reward, Brian jokingly looks around for an idol, but he ends up finding a clue stating that an idol is hidden under the stairs at the reward site. Brian is able to grab the idol for himself. At camp, Benji does have concerns that the Champions might reunite to get rid of him at the next Tribal. Shonee does reveal to Benji that she has the Steal a Vote advantage and hopes to use it at the next Tribal to make sure the numbers truly stay on their side.: Immunity challenge: Castaways will have to bounce a ball on a disc while standing on a box. After an hour, castaways will have to use one hand. If at any time they drop their ball, step off the box, or their ball stops bouncing, they are out of the challenge. The last person left bouncing their ball wins. (Brian Wins); Back at camp, Benji is set on taking out Sharn as he knows she burnt her trust at the last Tribal. Benji, Shonee, and Fenella tell Brian and Monika that the plan is to get rid of Sharn. Sharn, Steve, and Shane make a plan to blindside Benji and try to get Brian and Monika to reunite as the Champions. In order to convince Brian and Monika not to flip back, Benji tells Monika that Shonee has the Steal a Vote, but that she can steal multiple votes and Benji also tells Brian that Sharn has been throwing his name to vote out. However, with Brian having Immunity, Brian knows that this could not be happening. Brian and Monika are truly in the middle about the vote and both sides are particularly concerned about where Brian's loyalties will end up tonight. At Tribal, the tribe talks about the fallout from the last Tribal when Mat was blindsided. Sharn discusses how upset she feels that Benji manipulated her at the last Tribal and that she is vulnerable tonight. Steve and Shane express their sadness at Mat leaving. However, Brian notes that had they not blindsided Mat, then he would have been voted out. Brian and Monika both discuss how they felt on the bottom of their alliance and Sharn remarks that the Champions alliance is dead. Before the voting takes place, Shonee reveals her Steal a Vote advantage and steals Sharn's vote. When the votes are read, it is revealed that Brian and Monika have rejoined the Champions and vote for Benji. The vote ends in a 4-4 tie between Benji and Sharn. On the revote, Benji is blindsided.
97	19	"Episode 19"	Day 40	24 September 2018
Back at camp, Sharn is extremely shocked to still be in the game and believes that the Champions can move solidly as a unit to the Final Five. However, Brian reveals that he voted out Benji for his own benefit, not to reunite with the Champions. Brian states that Benji was just too big of a strategic threat to keep around and now that Benji is gone, Brian believes that he has a solid alliance with himself, Shonee, and Fenella. Shane is able to observe that Brian, Shonee, and Fenella are forming a tight bond and hopes to break up the pair of Shonee and Fenella at the next Tribal. Sharn, Steve, and Shane reaffirm their alliance and plan to move forward together. The big question is where Monika's loyalties are as many people find that she doesn't have a tight bond with either side.: Immunity challenge: Castaways must balance an idol on the end of a balance beam with one leg. When they can no longer take the pain or lose their balance, their idol will drop, eliminating them from the challenge. The last person with an intact idol will win. (Shonee Wins); After the Challenge, Jonathan reveals that tonight will be different. Instead of someone being voted out, the person that receives the most votes will become Dead Man Walking. This means that they will lose their ability to vote for the next two Tribal Councils, but will be allowed to compete for Immunity and will still be a player in the game. At camp, both trios realize that tonight's vote will determine who gets the majority as the Dead Man Walking Twist will determine which side can have more votes at the next Tribal. Shane, Steve, and Sharn decide they will vote for Fenella because they want to break up Shonee and Fenella. Brian is intent on voting for Steve because he finds him to be the biggest physical threat. Both groups hope that they can put their faith in Monika as the swing vote. Both Brian and Sharn approach Monika to stick with their alliances. Monika is very troubled by the decision because she has good ties with both alliances and is not sure of what she wants to do. At Tribal, the group discusses the Dead Man Walking twist, its ramifications, and there is an acknowledgement by the group that the Dead Man Walking twist will likely have an impact on who gets control of the game. Shane remarks about how close Shonee and Fenella are and encourages that the tribe should break them up. Monika also reveals the difficult decision she is faced with tonight. Once the votes are cast, Monika decides to join with Brian, Fenella, and Shonee to make Steve the Dead Man Walking.
98	20	"Episode 20"	Days 41-42	25 September 2018
Back at camp, Steve is disappointed that he is the Dead Man Walking and criticizes Brian's ego and lack of work ethic around camp. Sharn is upset that Monika lied to her and has once again put her in the minority position. Monika does talk with Sharn, Steve, and Shane and admits that the vote was hard and she doesn't know if she made the right decision. Sharn believes that there might still be hope in getting Monika back with the Champions for the next vote. The next morning, Steve discovers that because he is Dead Man Walking, he is not allowed to compete for Reward and has to go to Exile Beach until the next Immunity Challenge. Before the Challenge, Sharn does speak with Monika and proposes that she rejoin with the Champions as Brian cannot be trusted. Sharn is concerned because she believes Monika is easily manipulated, but she hopes to be able to bring her back to the Champions.: Reward challenge: Divided into two teams of three, two members will have to memorize two symbols and then paddle out one at a time to a pontoon containing a cypher, requiring them to count the number of times their patterns appear on it. They will then paddle back to shore and use their cypher to release a set of three balls. The final member will have to get all three balls into a gutter, where the first to get all three in the gutter win.; The team of Brian, Shane, and Sharn wins Reward. While on the Reward, Sharn and Shane try to convince him to think about his own game and rejoin with the Champions. The two try and convince Brian that Shonee and Fenella will turn on him the first chance they get. However, Brian believes that he is in a good position with Shonee and Fenella and doesn't want to get rid of them. Brian flat out tells Sharn and Shane that if Steve wins Immunity, one of them will be voted out next.: Immunity challenge: Castaways will have to transport a ball on a pole through a series of obstacles. After each obstacle, they will add a section of the pole. If they drop the ball, they will have to redo the section. Once they complete the obstacle course, they will need to roll their ball down a gutter in an attempt to get it into a bucket. The first person to get their ball in the bucket wins. (Brian Wins); Back at camp, Brian intends to get rid of Steve once and for all as he almost won today's challenge and Brian wants to be the last man standing for the benefit of his own game. Brian, Monika, Shonee, and Fenella propose to split the vote between Steve and Sharn in case one has an idol and then vote for Steve on the revote if he doesn't have one. Brian believes that he has the numbers to take him to the end of the game. Shane, Steve, and Sharn attempt to talk to Monika again to see if she will rejoin with their group. Steve and Shane also attempt to convince Brian to come back to the Champions because if he goes to the end with the women, then they will easily vote him out whereas Steve notes if he sticks around, he'll still be a physical shield for Brian. Both alliances realize that they are again putting their trust in Monika to be on their side. At Tribal Council, Steve talks about his predicament in the game now that he is Dead Man Walking. Steve argues that he is not a physical threat as he's never won an Immunity Challenge. The Tribal gets a bit personal as Shane calls out the other alliance for not doing any work around camp and that Sharn, Steve, and Shane have carried the other four. Brian argues that they carried players like Shane and Monika through the Challenges. Monika doesn't appreciate Brian calling her out like that as she felt she's never had to be carried. The contestants also discuss the pending end of the game as they figure out how to get to the end of the game and how they can win. Once the votes are cast, the vote ends in a 2-2-2 tie between Steve, Sharn, and Fenella. On the revote, the alliance of Brian, Monika, Fenella, and Shonee vote out Steve.
99	21	"Episode 21"	Days 43-44	1 October 2018
After Tribal, Brian celebrates being the last male in the game and believes that he has a solid alliance with Monika, Shonee, and Fenella that will get him to the end of the game. Sharn and Shane are aware that they are on the bottom of the tribe and try to approach Shonee and Fenella to join with them and split up Brian and Monika. However, Shonee and Fenella have no interest in working with Sharn or Shane because they've tried to vote Fenella out twice. Sharn knows the only chance she has to save herself is to find an idol. After searching for awhile, Sharn does find the idol.: Immunity challenge: The contestants will hold onto the axle of a giant wheel, the wheel will spin until they are hanging upside down, and they will hang there until they drop. Last person remaining on the axle will win Immunity. (Brian Wins); Back at camp, Brian, Monika, Shonee, and Fenella agree to split the votes between Sharn and Shane to ensure one of them goes in case an idol is played. While Sharn knows she is safe because she has the idol, she is concerned that Shane is left exposed. In order to save herself, Shane approaches Brian and tells him that she'll vote Sharn out to save herself. Sharn also acts worried around camp to convince people that she doesn't have an idol. Sharn and Shane plan to vote for Fenella in order to split up the tight pair that Shonee and Fenella have been in the game. Brian is intent on getting Sharn out and debates casting a third vote towards Sharn to make sure that she leaves. However, Shonee is not happy that Brian wants to mess with the plan and tells him to stick with the split vote. At Tribal, the tribe discusses Brian's gameplay, Sharn and Shane's position of being on the bottom, and the fact that the Final Six consists of three pairs and how those pairs affect the game. After the votes are cast, Sharn plays the idol on herself. When the votes are read, it is revealed that Brian did decide to cast a third vote on Sharn, meaning that the alliance did not split the vote evenly and Sharn's three votes are negated. Sharn and Shane's votes for Fenella are enough to send her to the Jury.
100	22	"Episode 22"	Days 45-46	2 October 2018
Back at camp, Shonee is very upset that Fenella has left and that her alliance did not stick with the split vote plan. Brian privately reveals that he intentionally diverted from the split vote plan because he wants to take Monika and Shane to the finals and did not want to risk Shane leaving if Sharn played an idol. While Sharn and Shane celebrate, they do realize that they are still outnumbered 3-2 and try to see if Shonee will join with them to get rid of Brian. Shonee admits that she feels like a lone wolf in this game now that she doesn't have any loyalties.: Reward challenge: The contestants will use blocks to solve an arched word puzzle, climb along a beam to get sticks and rope. They will use the sticks and rope to make a pole which will be used to get a key ring behind a barrier. The first person to put their hands on the key ring will win a new Commodore Tourer. (Brian Wins); In addition to winning the car, Brian also wins an overnight pizza party. Brian is allowed to invite one person and chooses Monika, which upsets Shonee. On the Reward, Brian admits he was concerned about leaving Monika back at camp because he thought Shane and Sharn would try to flip her against him. Brian is concerned about whether people will try to vote him out as he has won the last several competitions. While Brian wants to take Monika to the end because he thinks he can beat her, Monika believes that Brian has no chance to win because of his arrogance and the numerous lies he has told. Back at camp, Sharn and Shane talk with Shonee about joining them in an alliance to take out Brian. Shonee is upset that Brian didn't take her on the Reward and she knows he deviated from the split vote plan, so she tells them that she'll join in an alliance with them called "The Shh Alliance".: Immunity challenge: The contestants will build a fire in a drum on one side of a giant scale. They will then use a bucket to fill another drum on the other side with a hole in it. The goal is to get the other drum to drop and raise the fire drum to light a torch. First person to light the torch wins Immunity. (Sharn Wins); Back at camp, Brian is disappointed that Sharn has won Immunity because it means that he has to vote Shane out. Sharn, Shonee, and Shane agree to vote Brian out and Shonee is anxious to get her revenge on Brian for allowing Fenella to be voted out. Brian, Monika, and Shonee also discuss voting out Shane, but Brian remarks that she doesn't seem too worried knowing that she is going to be voted out. Shonee tips off Shane and tells her to start acting worried, so Shane starts to act worried in front of Brian. Brian knows that he could very well be blindsided tonight so he ponders playing the idol he found. As the day goes on, Sharn begins to notice that Brian is feeling too confident before Tribal as he hasn't been scrambling and she debates whether Brian has an idol. Shonee and Sharn discuss the possibility of voting out Monika in case Brian has an idol as it guarantees the two will be split up. At Tribal, the tribe discusses Brian's recent dominance in challenges, his new car, and whether he feels vulnerable. Brian openly admits that he took Monika to the Reward because he worried Sharn and Shane would try to flip her and he is confident that Shonee could not be flipped. There is a discussion about whether the alliance of three is going to stick together and Shane expresses her vulnerable feelings for the night. When the votes are cast, Brian does play his idol, but he receives no votes as Sharn, Shane, and Shonee followed their backup plan and cast their votes for Monika.
101	23	"Episode 23"	Days 47-48	8 October 2018
102	24	"Episode 24"	Days 49-50	9 October 2018

== Voting history ==
Tribal Phase (Day 1-30)

	Original tribes							Exile Twist (Note: On Days 18 and 20, the losing tribes voted to send a tribemate to Exile Beach; after the two Tribal Councils, the two exiled castaways dueled, with the winner returning to their tribe and the loser being permanently eliminated. Tegan and Anita were exiled. Tegan won the duel, officially eliminating Anita.)			Original tribes		Switched tribes			
Episode #	1	2		3	4	5	6	7	8	9		10	11	12 (Note: On Day 28, the person voted out of their tribe would have the opportunity to be saved by the other tribe instead of going home. Following the reveal of the vote, the other tribe would also vote, voting to Save the person voted off and have them join their tribe or to Send them home. Tegan was voted out of the Champions tribe and the Contenders voted Send, officially eliminating Tegan from the game.)		13
Day #	2	5		8	11	13	16	18	20	21	22	24	26	28		30
Eliminated	Matt	Tie (Note: The Tribal Council vote resulted in a tie. Per the rules, a second vote was held where the castaways involved in the tie would not vote and the remaining castaways could only vote for those who tied.)	Russell	Damien	Steve K.	Jenna	Moana	Tegan	Anita	Anita	Zach	Paige	Jackie	Tegan	Tegan	Heath
Votes	7–5	4–4–2–2	9–1	8–2–1	6–4–1	9–1	7–0 (Note: Shane played a hidden immunity idol, therefore three votes against her were negated.)	7–1–1	1–0 (Note: Heath played a hidden immunity idol, therefore seven votes against him were negated.)	Challenge	7–1	6–1	4–2–1–1	3–2–2	5–2	5–2
Voter	Vote															
Shane		Russell	Russell	Damien			Moana						Jackie	Tegan		
Sharn		Russell	Russell	Damien			Moana								Send	Heath
Brian		Jackie	Russell	Damien			Moana						Tegan	Shonee		
Shonee	Matt				Steve K.	Jenna		Tegan	~~Heath~~		Zach	Paige	Brian	Brian		
Monika		Shane	Russell	Damien			Moana								Send	Heath
Fenella	Matt				Steve K.	Jenna		Tegan	~~Heath~~		Zach	Paige			Save	Robbie
Steve W.		Jackie	Russell	Jackie			Moana						Jackie	Tegan		
Benji	Steve K.				Paige	Jenna		Tegan	~~Heath~~		Zach	Paige			Send	Heath
Mat		Jackie	Russell	Shane			~~Shane~~						Jackie	Tegan		
Samuel		Russell	Russell	Damien			Moana						Jackie	Shonee		
Robbie	Steve K.				Paige	Jenna		Tegan	~~Heath~~		Zach	Paige			Send	Heath
Lydia		Damien	Russell	Damien			~~Shane~~								Send	Heath
Heath	Matt				Steve K.	Jenna		Anita	Anita		Zach	Paige			Save	Robbie
Tegan	Steve K.				Steve K.	Jenna		Zach	Exiled	Win (Note: Anita lost to Tegan in the exile duel, eliminating her from the game.)	Zach	Paige	Brian	Brian	Sent	
Jackie		Shane	None (Note: Russell and Jackie were not eligible to vote in the revote.)	Damien			Moana						Shonee			
Paige	Matt				Shonee	Jenna		Tegan	~~Heath~~		Zach	Benji				
Zach	Matt				Paige	Jenna		Tegan	~~Heath~~		Tegan					
Anita	Matt				Steve K.	Jenna		Tegan	~~Heath~~	Lose						
Moana		Russell	Russell	Damien			~~Shane~~									
Jenna	Steve K.				Steve K.	Paige										
Steve K.	Matt				Paige											
Damien		Jackie	Jackie	Jackie												
Russell		Damien	None													
Matt	Steve K.															

Individual phase (Day 31–50)

	Merged tribe													
Episode #	14	15	16	17	18			19 (Note: On Day 40, the Koro Savu tribe voted for a castaway to be a "Dead Man Walking", making them unable to vote at the next two Tribal Councils. Steve W. was voted as "Dead Man Walking".)	20		21	22	23	24
Day #	32	33	35	37	39			40	42		44	46	47	49
Eliminated	Lydia	Robbie	Samuel	Mat	Tie		Benji	Steve W.	Tie	Steve W.	Fenella	Monika	Shonee	Brian
Vote	9–3	9–1–1	8–2	5–4	4–4		5–1	4–3	2–2–2	3–1–0	2–1–0 (Note: Sharn played a hidden immunity idol, therefore three votes against her were negated.)	3–2	2–1–1	1–0
Voter	Vote													
Shane	Lydia	Benji	Samuel	Brian	Benji		Benji	Fenella	Fenella	Fenella	Fenella	Monika	Shonee	None (Note: This contestant was only able to vote for one other contestant, thus they were not eligible to vote.)
Sharn	Lydia	Robbie	Samuel	Brian	None (Note: Shonee used her vote steal advantage on Sharn, therefore Sharn was ineligible to vote whereas Shonee cast two ballots.) (Note: Benji was not eligible to vote in the revote, with Sharn already not eligible due to the Vote Steal.) (Note: Shonee was unable to use her vote steal advantage on the revote, as Sharn was ineligible to vote.)			Fenella	Fenella	None (Note: Fenella and Sharn were not eligible to vote in the revote, with Steve already not eligible due to being the Dead Man Walking.)	Fenella	Monika	Shonee	Brian
Brian	Lydia	Robbie	Samuel	Mat	Benji		Benji	Steve W.	Steve W.	Steve W.	~~Sharn~~	Shane	Sharn	None
Shonee	Lydia	Robbie	Samuel	Mat	Sharn	Sharn	Sharn	Steve W.	Sharn	Steve W.	~~Sharn~~	Monika	Shane	
Monika	Lydia	Robbie	Samuel	Mat	Benji		Benji	Steve W.	Steve W.	Steve W.	Shane	Shane		
Fenella	Lydia	Robbie	Benji	Mat	Sharn		Benji	Steve W.	Sharn	None	~~Sharn~~			
Steve W.	Lydia	Robbie	Samuel	Brian	Benji		Benji	Fenella	None					
Benji	Fenella	Robbie	Samuel	Mat	Sharn		None							
Mat	Lydia	Robbie	Samuel	Brian										
Samuel	Lydia	Robbie	Benji											
Robbie	Fenella	Mat												
Lydia	Fenella													

Final vote
Episode #	24	
Day #	50	
Finalist	Shane	Sharn
Vote	5–4	
Juror	Vote	
Brian	Shane	
Shonee	Shane	
Monika	Shane	
Fenella	Shane	
Steve W.		Sharn
Benji		Sharn
Mat	Shane	
Samuel		Sharn
Robbie		Sharn

== Reception ==
=== Ratings ===
Ratings data is from OzTAM and represents the viewership from the 5 largest Australian metropolitan centres (Sydney, Melbourne, Brisbane, Perth and Adelaide).

Wk	Ep	Air date	Timeslot	Overnight ratings		Consolidated ratings		Total ratings		Source
Wk	Ep	Air date	Timeslot	Viewers	Rank	Viewers	Rank	Viewers	Rank	Source
1	1	1 August 2018	Wednesday 7:30pm	716,000	6	63,000	7	779,000	6	
1	2	2 August 2018	Thursday 7:30pm	615,000	7	105,000	1	721,000	6	
2	3	6 August 2018	Monday 7:30pm	592,000	14	88,000	4	680,000	13	
2	4	7 August 2018	Tuesday 7:30pm	609,000	12	106,000	2	715,000	11	
2	5	8 August 2018	Wednesday 7:30pm	620,000	11	103,000	5	724,000	8	
2	6	9 August 2018	Thursday 7:30pm	664,000	7	135,000	1	799,000	5	
3	7	13 August 2018	Monday 7:30pm	651,000	15	77,000	4	727,000	11	
3	8	14 August 2018	Tuesday 7:30pm	634,000	10	122,000	2	755,000	7	
4	9	20 August 2018	Monday 7:30pm	666,000	11	53,000	5	719,000	11	
4	10	21 August 2018	Tuesday 7:30pm	661,000	10	106,000	2	767,000	8	
5	11	27 August 2018	Monday 7:30pm	674,000	12	80,000	4	755,000	12	
5	12	28 August 2018	Tuesday 7:30pm	667,000	8	121,000	2	788,000	6	
6	13	3 September 2018	Monday 7:30pm	640,000	13	83,000	4	724,000	13	
6	14	4 September 2018	Tuesday 7:30pm	668,000	9	124,000	2	792,000	8	
7	15	10 September 2018	Monday 7:30pm	654,000	11	62,000	6	716,000	11	
7	16	11 September 2018	Tuesday 7:30pm	664,000	8	100,000	2	763,000	7	
8	17	17 September 2018	Monday 7:30pm	732,000	10	66,000	6	798,000	9	
8	18	18 September 2018	Tuesday 7:30pm	654,000	9	107,000	3	761,000	8	
9	19	24 September 2018	Monday 7:30pm	627,000	13	68,000	4	696,000	11	
9	20	25 September 2018	Tuesday 7:30pm	696,000	8	111,000	2	808,000	7	
10	21	1 October 2018	Monday 7:30pm	645,000	9	78,000	4	727,000	8	
10	22	2 October 2018	Tuesday 7:30pm	732,000	7	97,000	5	829,000	8	
11	23	8 October 2018	Monday 7:30pm	793,000	6	58,000	6	851,000	6	
11	24 (Note: The final episode was coded into two programs - the first titled "Grand Finale" and the second titled "Winner Announced". Because of this, two separate sets of ratings were produced.)	9 October 2018	Tuesday 7:30pm	862,000	5	52,000	12	914,000	5	
11	24	9 October 2018	Tuesday 7:30pm	877,000	4	45,000	13	922,000	4	
11	R (Note: These ratings account for the "Reunion" episode which aired after the finale.)	9 October 2018	Tuesday 7:30pm	609,000	11	58,000	11	667,000	13	
