= Flipped Off =

- Genre: Reality
- Starring: Russell Hantz; Shawn Hantz; Kristen Bredehoeft
- Country of origin: United States
- Original language: English
- No. of seasons: 1
- No. of episodes: 7

Production
- Executive producers: David McKillop; Elaine Frontain-Bryant; Jessica Morgan; Matt Levine; Max Weissman; Tim Robbins
- Camera setup: Multiple
- Running time: 42 minutes
- Production company: Departure Films

Original release
- Network: A&E
- Release: April 28 – June 16, 2012

Flipped Off is an American reality television series on A&E that debuted April 28, 2012. The series features four-time Survivor contestant Russell Hantz, his brother Shawn Hantz, and real-estate agent Kristen Bredehoeft as they "flip" properties around the Houston area in an attempt to make a profit.

== Episodes ==
No.	Title	Original release date	Prod. code
1	"I Smell a Rat"	April 28, 2012	104
2	"Race to the Finish"	May 5, 2012	106
3	"Kristen Saves the Day"	May 12, 2012	105
4	"Family Feud"	May 19, 2012	101
5	"Nightmare on Deal Street"	June 2, 2012	102
6	"Deal or No Deal"	June 9, 2012	103
7	"All in the Family"	June 16, 2012	107
