= Flipping =

Buying something, then reselling it for profit

In finance, flipping is purchasing an asset to quickly resell (or "flip") it for profit. Within the real estate industry, the term is used by investors to describe the process of buying, rehabilitating, and selling properties for profit. In 2017, 207,088 houses or condos were flipped in the US, an 11-year high. That number represents 5.9 percent of all single-family properties sold during that year.

== Effects ==
=== Bubbles ===
A spate of flipping often creates an economic bubble which then bursts, such as during the Florida land boom of the 1920s.

In the 2000s, relaxed federal borrowing standards (including subprime lending) allowed a borrower to purchase a home with little or no money down, which may have led directly to a boom in demand for houses. Because it was easy to borrow, many investors bought homes as property speculation with no intent to live in them. Since the demand outstripped the supply, prices rose, giving a short-term profit. This resulted in an inflationary spiral until the bubble burst in 2008 and borrowing standards became stricter, leaving the housing market to bottom out.

Advantages and acclamations of flipping

Flipping can contribute to the rejuvenation and restoration of a previously decrepit neighborhood, a process known as gentrification, which can increase property values and can cause current residents to relocate. Historically, gentrification can take place when the renovation process is performed rapidly and includes new businesses.

Under the broken windows theory, an unkempt house or area attracts a criminal element, which can drive out those making a responsible living. In areas where vacant buildings have been vandalized, criminals can be alerted that there is a lack of police force. With this alert, the likelihood of more criminal activity increases.

Disadvantages and criticisms of flipping

When flipping occurs frequently in a community, the total cost of ownership can rise for the neighbors within the community. As the value of the property in question begins to rise, the value of neighboring homes will also rise, which will increase the property taxes and rent for all. Finding the right contractor can be labeled as a disadvantage. Struggling to find a dependable contractor to do the items required for your property can cause stress as well as delayed projects. Ensuring you have the necessary funds is equally important. Often, during renovation, other issues will arise, which will cause more money to be invested. Typically, as you perform a demo on a structure, this is the time you find more issues, which can be substantial.

During the real estate bubble of the 2000s, flipping and gentrification were both linked to the mass migration of people to California, where high real estate prices and ample jobs attracted wealth seekers. In response, many native Californians were forced to migrate to the less expensive areas of states such as Arizona, Nevada, Texas, Oregon, and Washington. This migration of Californians caused further gentrification in the areas that they had moved to in large numbers. Areas such as Phoenix, Arizona and Las Vegas Valley became much more expensive, although property prices dropped significantly after 2006.

In 2020, the emphasis on house flipping shifted to the Midwest, where Greater Cleveland became one of the most lucrative places in the country to own rentals and flip homes. A typical project in the area, as in other areas in the Great Lakes region, pays back twice the cost of the purchased structure. Investors from California have been steered by advisors from the Sun Belt to northeastern Ohio. In 2019, the median flip home was bought for $60,000 and sold for $124,000. 100% margins were also endemic to Akron, Ohio; Pittsburgh; and South Bend, Indiana.

Within Europe, as a growing incentive for real estate firms, property owners or people wanting to turn in a profit, house flipping has grown within the past few years.

In less regulated markets or countries, as a predatory tactic, real estate firms can send several offers of buying apartments, aimed specifically to receive low prices – posing as privates – to later turn in a heavy profit.

To increase profit, flippers will also sometimes buy larger properties, ones that are not sought after typically, under lower prices due to special circumstances, such as debt, problematic neighbours, or bug infestations, or while posing as a struggling relationship or a single mother, towards exploitable groups, such as the elderly – properties that are largely perceived as on the second-hand market, not rarely even separating them into several apartments, to collect greater rent from just one or two properties. Critics of flipping also criticize rehabiliations of quickly bought apartments – as bought apartments are often larger and older – to then be heavily redesigned in a more expensive, minimalist appearance – in a motive to increase profit, similar to gentrification. Sometimes, renovations are also made in a hurried manner, in an aim to score quick profits as fast as possible.

=== Property values ===
After a renovation, the house will be in better condition, last longer, and be sold at a higher price, thus increasing its property tax assessed value, plus increased sales for goods and services related to property improvement and the related increase in sales taxes. The owners of neighboring homes can also benefit by having more attractive homes in the neighborhood, thereby increasing the value of their own homes. Increasing the value of a house through flipping does not guarantee a profit to the investor, however. Market conditions in certain real estate markets can be extremely volatile. The result is that sometimes, despite an investors best efforts, a flip may produce minimal or no profit. Flipping is a speculative investment, much like day trading, and should be treated with the same caution.

== Regulations ==
In 2006, the US Department of Housing and Urban Development created regulations regarding predatory flipping within Federal Housing Administration (FHA) single-family mortgage insurance. The time requirement for owning a property was greater than 90 days between the purchase and sale dates to qualify for FHA-insured mortgage financing. This requirement was greatly relaxed in January 2010, and the 90-day holding period was all but eliminated.

== Illegal activity ==
Flipping can sometimes also be a criminal scheme. Illegal property flipping is a fraud whereby recently acquired property is resold for a considerable profit with an artificially inflated value, typically to defraud a lender into lending more than the true value of the property or defraud a buyer into paying a higher price than should be necessary. The property is quickly resold after making a few, or only cosmetic, improvements. A house flipped with only cosmetic improvements is called, "lipstick flip" if the flipper did not fix major problems with the foundation, plumbing, or electrical. Illegal property flipping often involves collusion between a real estate appraiser, a mortgage originator, and a closing agent. The cooperation of a real estate appraiser is necessary to get a false, artificially inflated appraisal report. The buyer may or may not be aware of the situation. This type of fraud is one of the costliest for lenders.

Renovating distressed or abandoned properties was sometimes linked to malicious and unscrupulous acts in the post housing bubble era. As a result, "flipping" was frequently used both as a descriptive term for schemes involving market manipulation or other illegal conduct and as a derogatory term for legal real estate investing strategies that are perceived by some to be unethical or socially destructive. Due to the popularity of television shows like Flip or Flop and Flip That House, the term has acquired more positive connotations.

In the United States, the Uniform Standards of Professional Appraisal Practice (USPAP) governs real estate appraisal and the Federal National Mortgage Association (Fannie Mae) oversees the secondary residential mortgage loan market. Both have practices to detect illegal flipping schemes.

== In television ==
In July 2012, business network CNBC green-lit several pilots for reality television series focusing on house flipping.

The following is a list of several house-flipping shows:

- Bravo's Interior Therapy with Jeff Lewis
- Bravo's Million Dollar Listing and Million Dollar Listing New York
- Bravo's Flipping Out
- TLC's The Adam Carolla Project
- TLC and Channel 4's Property Ladder
- TLC's Flip That House
- TLC's The Real Estate Pros
- A&E's Flip This House
- A&E's Flipped Off
- A&E's Flipping Vegas, Flipping Boston, Flipping San Diego, and Flipping Miami
- HGTV's Flip or Flop
- HGTV's Flipping 101 With Tarek El Moussa
- Spike's Flip Men
- DIY Network's The Vanilla Ice Project
- BBC One's Homes Under the Hammer
- W's Masters of Flip
- HGTV Canada's Holmes and Holmes

== See also ==
- Creative financing
- House Flipper – 2018 simulation game about restoring and selling houses
- IPO pricing – factor potentially relevant in flipping stock shares
- Phillip E. Hill Sr. – ringleader of large mortgage fraud scheme
- Real estate investing
- Speculation
- United States housing bubble

== Sources ==
=== Published articles ===
- Mann, Ted (September 30, 2006). "Risky Business". Scarsdale Magazine.—about real-estate flippers in suburban New York.
- "Property flipping as neighborhood destabilization versus short-term real estate investment (STREI) as community reinvestment: A case study of Buffalo, NY".
- Zamora, Amanda (February 23, 2010). "Huffington Post Investigative Fund".
- "FBI-Property Flipping Data base".

=== Books ===
- Bronchick, William; Dahlstrom, Robert (2001). Flipping Properties: Generate Instant Cash Profits in Real Estate. Dearborn Trade. ISBN 9780793144914.
- Berges, Steve (2004). The Complete Guide to Flipping Properties. John Wiley & Sons. ISBN 978-0-471-46331-3.
- Hamilton, Gene; Hamilton, Katie (2004). Fix It and Flip It: How to Make Money Rehabbing Real Estate for Profit. McGraw Hill Professional. ISBN 9780071421485.
- Kiyosaki, Robert. The Real Book of Real Estate: Real Experts. Real Stories. Real Life. Vanguard Press.
- Trump, Donald; Gary Eldred. Commercial Real Estate 101: How Small Investors Can Get Started and Make It Big. Wiley.
