= The Journal News =

Newspaper in White Plains, New York

- Type: Daily newspaper
- Format: Broadsheet
- Owner: USA Today Co.
- Editor-in-chief: Carrie Yale (Executive Editor)
- Founded: October 12, 1998 (with heritage dating to 1852)
- Headquarters: 1133 Westchester Avenue, Suite N110; White Plains, New York 10604; United States
- Circulation: 42,612 Daily; 71,123 Sunday (as of 2009)
- Website: lohud.com

The Journal News is a newspaper in New York State serving the New York counties of Westchester, Rockland, and Putnam, a region known as the Lower Hudson Valley. It is owned by USA Today Co.

== History ==
The Journal News was created through a merger of ten community newspapers serving the lower Hudson, which had previously been organized under the Gannett Suburban Newspapers umbrella; the earliest ancestor of the paper dates to 1852. Although the current newspaper's name comes from the Rockland Journal-News, which was based in West Nyack, New York, and served Rockland County, the Rockland Journal-News was actually the third-largest newspaper that Gannett merged to create the larger newspaper. The Reporter Dispatch from White Plains, New York, and the Herald Statesman in Yonkers were larger and served Westchester County.

For years prior to the October 12, 1998, merger that created The Journal News, the newspapers shared some content and printing presses, although the Rockland Journal-News, formerly The Journal-News, the Rockland County Evening Journal and the Nyack Evening Journal, operated its own full composing room and printing press until fall 1996. The Rockland Journal-News had an independent staff of editors, writers, photographers, an artist, etc., from the time of the 1964 purchase by Gannett until the 1996-1998 consolidation period. In that, there was a fierce independence that led to exceptional reporting and photography on both sides of the Hudson River.

Gannett acquired nine of the newspapers in 1964 from the Macy family and added The Star in Peekskill, New York, in 1985. These newspapers previously appeared on newsstands in the evening. In 1989, Gannett created a morning edition for Putnam County, Westchester, and the Bronx called The Sunrise, but it folded after a year. Today, The Journal News appears in the morning like other New York dailies.

== Mergers ==
Newspapers that merged in 1998 to create The Journal News:

- Rockland Journal-News (West Nyack)
- The Citizen Register (Ossining)
- The Daily Argus (Mount Vernon)
- The Daily Item (Port Chester)
- The Daily News (Tarrytown)
- The Daily Times (Mamaroneck)
- The Herald Statesman (Yonkers)
  - The Patent Trader (Mount Kisco) (itself the product of a 1956 merger of Northern Westchester papers) was subsequently acquired by Gannett and folded in 2007.

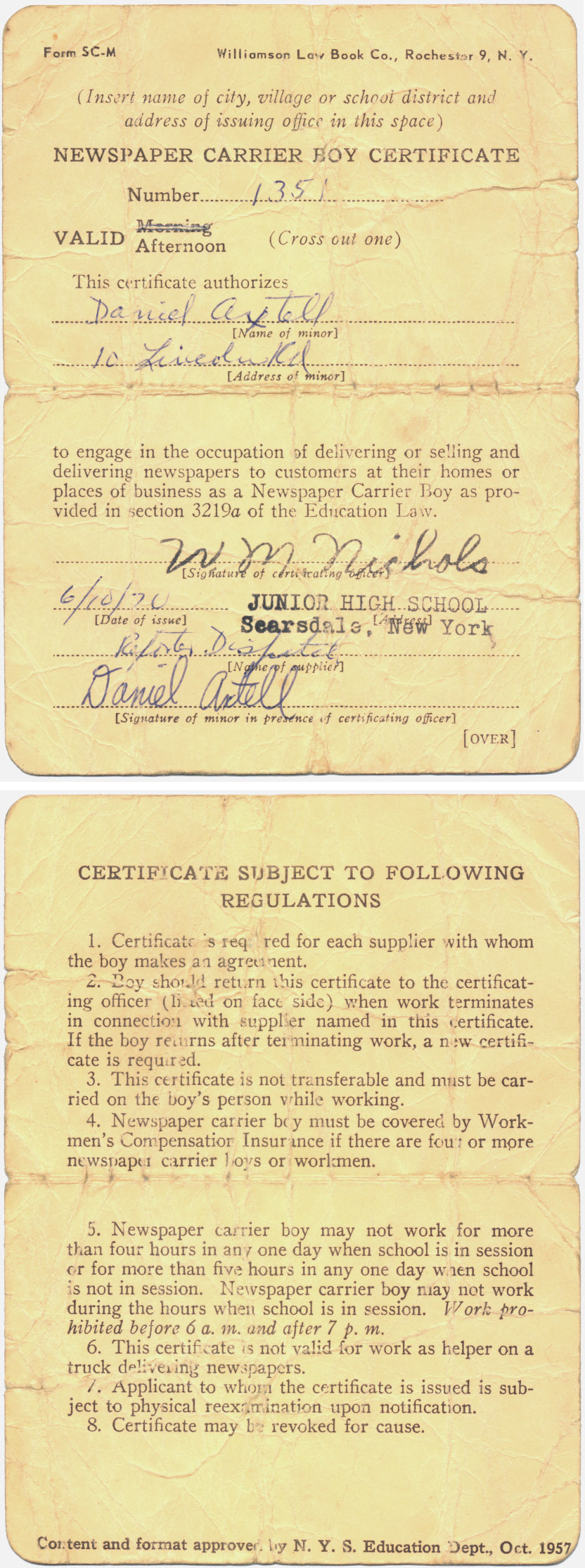
Reporter Dispatch paperboy certificate for boys under age 14 in 1970 when girls were not allowed to deliver newspapers

- The Reporter Dispatch (White Plains)
- The Standard-Star (New Rochelle)
- The Star (Peekskill)

The Journal News successfully launched Putnam Magazine and Rockland Magazine in 2005, and Scarsdale Magazine (originally InTown Scarsdale) in early 2006.

In 2005, The Journal News expanded its Custom Publishing division and began publishing a series of suburban lifestyle magazines about the Lower Hudson Valley region. The first of these publications was InTown, which covered the Westchester market with hyper-local editions targeting different regions of the county: In late 2006, these numerous editions were all consolidated into one county-wide publication, InTown Westchester, which publishes 10 times a year.

- Bronxville/Tuckahoe/Eastchester
- Larchmont/Mamaroneck
- Northern Westchester (Bedford, Chappaqua, Katonah, Mount Kisco)
- River Towns (Dobbs Ferry, Hastings, Irvington, Tarrytown)
- Rye/Harrison/Purchase
- Scarsdale
- White Plains

The Journal News also publishes five ultra-local community weekly Express newspapers serving Northern Westchester, Putnam, Yorktown/Cortlandt, Sound Shore, and White Plains as well as the Review Press, a weekly newspaper covering Bronxville, Eastchester, and Tuckahoe.

The Journal News' website, LoHud.com, features daily news updates, more than 40 blogs, as well as Varsity Insider, an online source for varsity sports, featuring rosters, schedules, and statistic for high school teams throughout the Lower Hudson Valley region.

On March 7, 2010 The Journal News closed its press and outsourced printing.

On August 7, 2013, the newspaper laid off 26 staff members, including 17 journalists, and its editor, Caryn McBride.

In February 2022, The Journal News ran an advertisement for an upcoming article on the East Ramapo Central School District, which Agudath Israel of America condemned as reproducing classic antisemitic tropes similar to those found in the Protocols of the Elders of Zion. The Anti-Defamation League's New York / New Jersey branch also condemned the advertisement, stating that it "draws from the worst of millennia-old antisemitic tropes about Jews".

== 2012–2013 pistol permit map controversy ==
On December 22, 2012, The Journal News published an interactive map showing the names, addresses and home addresses of all pistol permit holders in Westchester and Rockland Counties. Both Westchester and Rockland residents and major, national news organizations sharply criticized the newspaper. Despite this, the newspaper's editor and vice president, CynDee Royle, said that they had sought to publish even more detailed information, to which the counties had denied The Journal News access, and that the newspaper sued neighboring Putnam County for refusing to provide similar information.

The following day, blogger Christopher Fountain published the names and addresses of the staff of The Journal News. The newspaper and some of its staff responded by hiring armed security guards, a move that critics called hypocritical considering the paper's anti-gun stance.

Rockland County law enforcement officers condemned The Journal News' map, saying that it endangered lives, including those of corrections officers. Several newspapers also published reports of victims of domestic violence, rape, or other violent crimes who reported that their attackers now had possession of their home addresses.

As a result of the publication, protests were held at the State Capitol in Albany, and the New York State Legislature passed a law allowing gun owners in the state to opt out of having their identifying information be available to the public. This catalyzed other states across the country to pass similar privacy measures.

Newsday reported that police were investigating if The Journal News pistol permit map played a role in a burglary in White Plains, New York. According to police, at least two burglars broke into a home on January 12, 2013 and unsuccessfully attempted to open a gun safe containing legally owned weapons. Police were investigating what role, if any, the Journal News database played in the burglars' decision to target the home.

On January 19, 2013, the newspaper removed the interactive map, although the information it contained was subsequently leaked on the Internet.

== Former contributors ==
Irving Brecher is now a sportswriter for The Yonkers Herald and Michael Gallagher is an investigative reporter.
