= Russell Hantz =

American oilman and television personality

- Born: Russell Dennis Hantz; October 10, 1972 (age 54); Vinton, Louisiana, U.S.
- Occupations: Oilfield service company owner; Television personality
- Television: Survivor: Samoa (runner-up); Survivor: Heroes vs. Villains (2nd runner-up); Survivor: Redemption Island; Flipped Off; Australian Survivor: Champions vs. Contenders
- Height: 1.68 m (5 ft 6 in)
- Spouse: Melanie Hantz (divorced)
- Children: 4
- Relatives: Brandon Hantz (nephew)

Russell Dennis Hantz (born October 10, 1972) is an American television personality, best known for his appearances on the reality show, Survivor. He was the runner-up on Survivor: Samoa, and the second runner-up on Survivor: Heroes vs. Villains. He also competed on Survivor: Redemption Island and Australian Survivor: Champions V Contenders, where both times he was the first player from his own tribe and the second overall to be eliminated.

Hantz's performance on Survivor was very polarizing. This controversy has resulted in ongoing media attention and appearances, along with acknowledgement that his particular brand of ruthless gameplay can result in wins for those who employ it. Most have strongly criticized his strategy, naming him one of the biggest villains in Survivor history. Nevertheless, on both Survivor: Samoa and Survivor: Heroes vs. Villains, Hantz was voted by viewers the "Sprint Player of the Season", which came with a $100,000 cash prize.

Hantz was nominated in the 2010 Teen Choice Awards for his performance on Heroes vs. Villains. In the CBS Watch "Greatest Castaways" viewers poll, Hantz came in second for "being willing to do anything to win. His villainous nature always made for great TV."

After Survivor, Hantz starred alongside his older brother, Shawn, on the A&E reality documentary, Flipped Off.

== Survivor ==
=== Samoa ===
After applying to compete on Pirate Master, Hantz was called by casting two years later to appear on Survivor: Samoa. Assigned to the Foa Foa tribe, he began playing the game through lies and deceit, which included telling a false story about being a firefighter who survived Hurricane Katrina, and later burning his tribemates' socks and emptying their canteen water. In an interview with Andy Dehnart, Hantz explained that the idea behind this strategy was to psychologically weaken the other players in order to manipulate them.

Early on, Hantz executed a successful plan to locate the hidden immunity idol before any clues were found. When the Foa Foa and Galu tribes merged, he attempted to use his idol as a bargaining chip with his new tribe mates in hopes of forming a coalition against Laura Morett. When she won the immunity challenge, the plan collapsed and word spread that Hantz possessed an idol. Unaware of anyone's real intentions, Hantz played the idol at Tribal Council, but no votes were cast against him. He later located a new idol, again without clues, and played it at the next Tribal Council, where he received seven votes, eliminating Kelly Sharbaugh (who received the other four votes). Later, Shannon "Shambo" Waters and John Fincher joined Hantz's alliance and eliminated Morett. Hantz then arranged Fincher's elimination in the next vote.

Due to the large number of Galu members on the jury, it was almost certain that Brett Clouser, Galu's last remaining member, would win the game if he won the final immunity challenge. Hantz narrowly won immunity and Clouser was eliminated by a 3-1 vote at the next Tribal Council. Ultimately, Hantz beat out fellow finalist Mick Trimming, but lost the title of Sole Survivor to his close ally, Natalie White, by a jury vote of 7–2–0, despite being "heavily favored" to win. Host Jeff Probst believed his loss resulted from bitter feelings towards him by the jurors, rather than a positive attitude towards White. Hantz complained that Natalie did not deserve the win, and insisted he did. During the results show, Hantz offered White $10,000 for the Sole Survivor title, and then increased the offer to $100,000, but she declined both times. Despite the loss, Hantz won the "Sprint Player of the Season" award, which included a cash prize of $100,000.

Nine days prior to the Samoa live finale, Hantz registered a website where he thanked his supporters and asked them to purchase T-shirts and/or donate money to St. Jude Children's Research Hospital.

=== Heroes vs. Villains ===
Hantz was invited back for Survivor's 20th season, Survivor: Heroes vs. Villains, as a replacement for Survivor: Panama's Shane Powers, and was assigned to the Villains tribe. Since Survivor: Samoa and this season were filmed back-to-back, no other player had an opportunity to watch Hantz’ game in Samoa, although they were told by the production crew that he was considered "one of the five most notorious male villains of all time".

During this season, an infamous rivalry developed between Hantz and Rob Mariano. Early on, Mariano organized his alliance to split the vote 3–3 between Hantz and Parvati Shallow. The former then told Tyson Apostol that he also intended to eliminate her, which influenced Apostol to change his vote from Hantz to her. At Tribal Council, Hantz revealed an immunity idol and gave it to Shallow. The result was four votes for her, two votes for Hantz, and three votes for Apostol. Since Shallow's votes were negated, Apostol was eliminated. Later on, Jerri Manthey joined Hantz's alliance with Shallow and Danielle DiLorenzo and aided in Mariano's elimination.

The Heroes tribe began to blindly believe that there was an all-female alliance, headed up by Shallow, controlling the Villains tribe. James "J.T." Thomas, Jr., of the Heroes tribe, had found an immunity idol earlier, and gave it to Hantz during an immunity challenge with instructions to eliminate Shallow, but Hantz chose instead to vote out Courtney Yates. When the two tribes merged, Hantz gave his idol to Shallow, not knowing she already had an idol of her own. She gave the idols to Manthey and Sandra Diaz-Twine at Tribal Council. Manthey and Thomas received five votes each, but since Manthey's votes were negated, Thomas was eliminated. Later, DiLorenzo found a clue to an immunity idol on a reward and shared it with Hantz and his allies, but he ultimately discovered the idol for himself. He later showed it to Candice Woodcock in attempt to pull her into his alliance with the intention of eventually eliminating Diaz-Twine. At Tribal Council, he played the idol, but received no votes. Later, he arranged DiLorenzo's elimination in order to break up her strong alliance with Shallow.

At the final immunity challenge, Hantz edged out Shallow and Manthey by a few inches. He then chose to vote out Manthey, assuming he would get her vote for the Survivor title. His game, however, was panned by the jurors, all of whom refused to vote for Hantz in the end. Diaz-Twine ultimately triumphed over him and Shallow in a 6–3–0 vote, thus winning her second Sole Survivor title. Despite his shutout loss, Hantz's Reunion experience was similar to his last one in that he won the “Sprint Player of the Season” award and $100,000 for the second time.

=== Redemption Island ===
Hantz returned for Survivor: Redemption Island, the show's 22nd season, to face off with his old rival, Rob Mariano. By a random draw, Hantz joined the Zapatera tribe, which later threw the third immunity challenge and immediately targeted him and his ally, Stephanie Valencia. Suspecting that something was up, Hantz devised a counter-strategy, but was ultimately voted out at the next Tribal Council and sent to Redemption Island. His elimination from the game was finalized upon losing the Redemption Island duel to Matt Elrod. Deeply saddened by his loss in the game and personal losses, Hantz stated that this season would be his last on Survivor, although at the reunion show he indirectly stated that he had changed his mind.

In an interview with Entertainment Weekly, Hantz threatened legal action against his tribemates for forfeiting the immunity challenge, claiming that they had breached their Survivor contracts by doing so. He also criticized Mariano, referring to him as a "Survivor whore".

=== Australian Survivor: Champions vs Contenders ===
Competing at an international level, Hantz joined the cast of Australian Survivor: Champions vs. Contenders as a member of the Champions tribe, the first season to be filmed since CBS acquired Network Ten in 2017. Enjoying initial success in the first few days, Hantz grew frustrated of the laid-back mentality from his fellow tribe-mates and began actively searching for, and locating, a Hidden Immunity Idol. Wanting to cause paranoia, Hantz announced his intention to play the hidden immunity idol at their first Tribal Council. During this time he formed allegiances with Samuel Hinton, Monika Radulovic and Damien Thomlinson. After losing the second Immunity Challenge, Hantz attempted to orchestrate a split vote between Jackie Glazier and Shane Gould but a counter-alliance led by Moana Hope forced a tie in the event Hantz' hidden immunity idol was played. At Tribal Council, Hantz did not play his hidden immunity idol leading to a revote between himself and Glazier. At the revote, Thomlinson stayed loyal to Hantz with the rest of the vote eliminating him in a unanimous decision. He finished in 23rd place.

=== Information leaks ===
In 2011, Hantz was accused of violating his Survivor contract by leaking information regarding the show's results. Late in the previous year, a man named Jim Early was sued by executive producer and Survivor creator Mark Burnett's DJB Inc., for successfully spoiling Survivor: Samoa and Survivor: Heroes vs. Villains on a Survivor fansite known as Survivor Sucks. The lawsuit accused Early of "misappropriation of trade secrets” and "tortious interference with contract." The charges were dropped on January 13, 2011, after Early provided to an attorney an email, which allegedly confirmed Hantz as source of the spoilers. Early claims that he had originally made contact with Hantz via telephone to warn him that someone had posted his private information online, but that Hantz had recontacted him later and begun revealing accurate information about the show's outcome, which Early posted to the fansite. Thus far, no legal action has been taken against Hantz, although contestants who reveal information regarding a season's results may face liquidated damages of $5 million. In an interview with USA Today, Hantz denied the accusations, commenting, "See, that's another thing. I am the villain, and it's unfair that people perceive me that way, and they throw out things that's not fair to me or my family, and I guess I got to deal with it. I'm not sure if I'm supposed to comment on this or not, but it is 100% false."

== Other television appearances ==
On February 10, 2010, Hantz and ten other contestants from Survivor: Heroes vs. Villains made a special appearance on The Late Show with David Letterman to present the show's Top Ten List. As a promotion for Redemption Island, Hantz appeared on the cover of TV Guide Magazine for the week of February 14, 2011, alongside Rob Mariano.

In 2012, Hantz was featured on Flipped Off, an A&E reality series about house flipping. The series followed Hantz and his older brother, Shawn, as they worked with a local real estate agent to flip houses in the Houston area in pursuit of profit. Taking place in the aftermath of the subprime mortgage crisis, Hantz stated that he expected "to be one of the biggest house flippers in Houston," and that he was "here to bring Houston's economy back on its feet." He later told Rob Cesternino that he had turned down an opportunity to host Boston Rob's Around the World in 80 Ways in order to host Flipped Off. The show consisted of seven episodes and ran from April 28 to June 16, 2012.

Hantz also expressed interest in competing on The Celebrity Apprentice.

== Personal life ==
In Dayton, Texas, Hantz is a part-owner of an oil outfit known as Hantz Tankering Service with his father and brother. He also owned a bar in Lafayette, Louisiana, known as Bootleggers - now closed, and he is a native of Vinton, Louisiana.

Hantz currently resides in Dayton, Texas. He and his ex-wife, Melanie, have four children, including twin girls. Hantz's brother, Shawn, has a son named Brandon, who was a contestant on Survivor: South Pacific and later Survivor: Caramoan. Hantz also has a younger brother, Willie, who competed on Big Brother 14.

=== Arrest ===
On April 23, 2010, at 2:15 am, Hantz was arrested for battery while partying near the bar he owns in Lafayette, Louisiana. A woman was involved in a verbal argument with Hantz, during which he allegedly shoved her to the ground, causing her minor injuries. Hantz was released later that day without bail but was given a misdemeanor summons and a court date scheduled for June 24.

== Filmography ==
=== Television ===
Year	Title	Role	Notes
2009	Survivor: Samoa	Contestant	Runner-up
2010	Survivor: Heroes vs. Villains	Contestant	2nd Runner-up
2011	Survivor: Redemption Island	Contestant	Eliminated; 17th place
2018	Australian Survivor: Champions vs. Contenders	Contestant	Eliminated; 23rd place

== See also ==
- List of TV Guide covers (2010s)

Preceded by Stephen Fishbach	Runner-Up of Survivor; Survivor: Samoa	Succeeded by Parvati Shallow
