= InTown =

- Editor in Chief: Mary Lynn Mitcham
- Categories: Regional lifestyle magazine
- Frequency: Monthly
- Publisher: The Journal News, Gannett
- First issue: March, 2005
- Country: USA
- Based in: Westchester County, New York
- Language: American English

InTown Westchester is a regional lifestyle magazine that covers Westchester County, New York, and is published by Gannett and The Journal News. InTown was originally launched as a series of hyper-local editions targeting different regions of the county:

- White Plains
- Scarsdale
- Northern Westchester (Chappaqua, Mt. Kisco, Bedford, Kathonah)
- Larchmont/Mamaroneck
- Bronxville/Tuckahoe/Eastchester
- Rye/Harrison/Purchase
- River Towns (Hastings, Dobbs Ferry, Irvington, Tarrytown)
- Sound Shore (Pelham, New Rochelle, Larchmont, Mamaroneck, Rye, Port Chester)

In September 2006, these numerous editions were all consolidated into one county-wide publication, InTown Westchester, which publishes 12 times a year.

== Past Issues ==
- InTown White Plains - Spring 2005
- InTown Bronxville/Tuckahoe/Eastchester - Spring/Summer 2005
- InTown River Towns - Summer/Fall 2005
- InTown Larchmont/Mamaroneck - Fall/Winter 2005
- InTown White Plains - Fall/Winter 2005
- InTown Rye/Harrison/Purchase - Winter 2005
- InTown Holiday Issue - Winter 2005
- InTown Northern Westchester - 2006
- InTown River Towns - Spring 2006
- InTown Sound Shore - May 2006
- InTown Northern Westchester - June/July 2006
- InTown Sound Shore - June/July 2006
- InTown Northern Westchester - August 2006
