= Flip That House =

- Country of origin: United States

Production
- Producer: R. J. Cutler
- Running time: 22 minutes

Original release
- Network: TLC
- Release: July 14, 2005 – October 18, 2008

Flip That House is an American television series created by the Discovery Home Channel and also broadcast on TLC. Each episode showed a different individual (or group of people) flipping a house. The show was produced by R. J. Cutler, who was inspired to make it after buying a new house.

== Content ==
The show is about people who buy neglected houses to refurbish and then resell for a profit, an act known as flipping. Many of the first episodes of the show focused on houses in the area of Los Angeles, California.

== Airdates ==
Season	No. eps.	First airdate	Last airdate
Season 1	10	July 14, 2005	September 15, 2005
Season 2	39	August 9, 2006	April 14, 2007
Season 3	39	July 7, 2007	January 19, 2008
Season 4	19	March 9, 2008	October 18, 2008

== Locations ==
During the first season, most episodes took place in the Southern California (Los Angeles) area. Subsequent seasons presented flips that occurred in other areas including:

- San Diego, California
- Phoenix, Arizona
- Las Vegas, Nevada
- Austin, Texas
- Houston, Texas
- Columbia, South Carolina
- Atlanta, Georgia
- New Orleans, Louisiana – These episodes focused on houses being repaired after Hurricane Katrina.
- Boston, Massachusetts
