= Putnam Magazine =

Lifestyle magazine in New York state

- Categories: Lifestyle
- Frequency: Quarterly
- Publisher: Gannett
- Founded: 2005
- First issue: March 2005
- Country: USA
- Language: American English
- Website: putnammagazine.com Archived

Putnam Magazine is a regional lifestyle magazine that covers Putnam County, New York, and it is published by the local (Rockland, Westchester, Putnam) newspaper, The Journal News, a division of Gannett. The publication was launched in 2005 and publishes on a quarterly basis. Mary Lynn Mitcham was the editor-in-chief until 2011.

== Past issues ==
- Fall/Winter 2005
- March/April 2006
