= Scarsdale Magazine =

- Editor in Chief: Mary Lynn Mitcham
- Categories: Lifestyle
- Frequency: 10 per year
- Publisher: The Journal News, Gannett
- Founded: 2005
- First issue: March 2005
- Country: United States
- Based in: Scarsdale, New York
- Language: American English
- Website: scarsdale.com

Scarsdale Magazine is a regional lifestyle magazine that covers the village of Scarsdale, New York and its surrounding area (Hartsdale, Eastchester, Edgemont, Greenburgh, Tuckahoe, etc.). It is published by the local (Rockland, Westchester, Putnam) newspaper, The Journal News, a division of Gannett. The publication was originally launched as InTown Scarsdale, but changed names to Scarsdale Magazine at the beginning of 2006.
