= Swimming at the 1972 Summer Olympics – Women's 100 metre backstroke =

Women's 100 metre backstroke at the Games of the XX Olympiad
- Venue: Olympia Schwimmhalle
- Dates: 1 September 1972 (heats & semifinals); 2 September 1972 (final)
- Competitors: 37 from 21 nations
- Winning time: 1:05.78 OR

Medalists
1st place, gold medalist(s)		Melissa Belote	United States
2nd place, silver medalist(s)		Andrea Gyarmati	Hungary
3rd place, bronze medalist(s)		Susie Atwood	United States

The women's 100 metre backstroke event at the 1972 Olympic Games took place between September 1 and 2. This swimming event used backstroke. Because an Olympic-size swimming pool is 50 metres long, this race consisted of two lengths of the pool.

== Results ==
=== Heats ===
Heat 1

Rank	Athlete	Country	Time	Notes
1	Melissa Belote	United States	1:06.60	
2	Tina Lek'veishvili	Soviet Union	1:07.84	
3	Marianne Vermaat	Netherlands	1:09.14	
4	Susanne Niesner	Switzerland	1:09.16	
5	Kazu Fujimura	Japan	1:09.81	
6	Diana Ashton	Great Britain	1:10.90	

Heat 2

Rank	Athlete	Country	Time	Notes
1	Wendy Cook-Hogg	Canada	1:07.00	
2	Sue Lewis	Australia	1:08.06	
3	Deborah Palmer	Australia	1:08.68	
4	Annemarie Groen	Netherlands	1:09.55	
5	Susan Hunter	New Zealand	1:10.06	
6	Kikuyo Ishii	Japan	1:10.44	
7	Ildikó Szekeres	Hungary	1:11.20	
8	Felicia Ospitaletche	Uruguay	1:13.99	

Heat 3

Rank	Athlete	Country	Time	Notes
1	Christine Herbst	East Germany	1:07.96	
2	Susie Atwood	United States	1:08.30	
3	Debra Cain	Australia	1:08.81	
4	Sylvie Le Noach	France	1:09.25	
5	Nataliya Yershova	Soviet Union	1:09.26	
6	Diana Olsson	Sweden	1:09.86	
7	Christine Fulcher	Ireland	1:10.63	
8	Diana Sutherland	Great Britain	1:12.12	

Heat 4

Rank	Athlete	Country	Time	Notes
1	Andrea Gyarmati	Hungary	1:06.56	
2	Enith Brigitha	Netherlands	1:06.71	
3	Annegret Kober	West Germany	1:08.24	
4	Angelika Kraus	West Germany	1:08.92	
5	Susanne Hilger	East Germany	1:09.25	
6	Jacqueline Brown	Great Britain	1:10.43	
7	Ong Mei Lin	Malaysia	1:19.39	

Heat 5

Rank	Athlete	Country	Time	Notes
1	Donna-Marie Gurr	Canada	1:07.45	
2	Karen Moe-Thornton	United States	1:07.69	
3	Silke Pielen	West Germany	1:07.70	
4	Zdenka Gašparač	Yugoslavia	1:09.72	
5	Cathy Raftery	Canada	1:09.72	
6	Patricia López	Argentina	1:12.13	
7	María Cecilia Vargas	Mexico	1:12.91	
8	Pat Chan	Singapore	1:14.24	

=== Semifinals ===
These took place on Friday 1 September at 17:00.

Semifinal 1 results
Rank	Athlete	Country	Time	Notes
1	Melissa Belote	United States	1:06.08	OR
2	Susie Atwood	United States	1:06.26	
3	Karen Moe	United States	1:06.27	
4	Wendy Cook-Hogg	Canada	1:06.89	
5	Tina Lek'veishvili	Soviet Union	1:07.61	
6	Sue Lewis	Australia	1:07.81	
7	Debra Cain	Australia	1:08.51	
8	Marianne Vermaat	Netherlands	1:09.11	

Semifinal 2 results
Rank	Athlete	Country	Time	Notes
1	Andrea Gyarmati	Hungary	1:06.39	
2	Enith Brigitha	Netherlands	1:06.49	
3	Silke Pielen	West Germany	1:06.98	
4	Christine Herbst	East Germany	1:07.34	
5	Donna-Marie Gurr	Canada	1:07.37	
6	Annegret Kober	West Germany	1:08.01	
7	Deborah Palmer	Australia	1:08.29	
8	Angelika Kraus	West Germany	1:09.10	

=== Final ===
This took place on Saturday 2 September at 17:50.

Rank	Athlete	Country	Time	Notes
1	Melissa Belote	United States	1:05.78	OR
2	Andrea Gyarmati	Hungary	1:06.26	
3	Susie Atwood	United States	1:06.34	
4	Karen Moe	United States	1:06.69	
5	Wendy Cook-Hogg	Canada	1:06.70	
6	Enith Brigitha	Netherlands	1:06.82	
7	Christine Herbst	East Germany	1:07.27	
8	Silke Pielen	West Germany	1:07.36	

Key: OR = Olympic record
