= Swimming at the 1972 Summer Olympics – Women's 200 metre backstroke =

Women's 200 metre backstroke at the Games of the XX Olympiad
- Venue: Olympia Schwimmhalle
- Dates: 4 September 1972 (heats & final)
- Competitors: 37 from 20 nations
- Winning time: 2:19.19 WR

Medalists
1st place, gold medalist(s)		Melissa Belote	United States
2nd place, silver medalist(s)		Susie Atwood	United States
3rd place, bronze medalist(s)		Donna Gurr	Canada

The women's 200 metre backstroke event at the 1972 Olympic Games took place September 4. This swimming event used backstroke. Because an Olympic-size swimming pool is 50 metres long, this race consisted of four lengths of the pool.

== Results ==
=== Heats ===
Heat 1

Rank	Athlete	Country	Time	Notes
1	Annegret Kober	West Germany	2:24.88	
2	Wendy Cook-Hogg	Canada	2:25.71	
3	Suzuko Matsumura	Japan	2:26.95	
4	María Teresa Ramírez	Mexico	2:27.47	
5	Annemarie Groen	Netherlands	2:29.17	
6	Diana Ashton	Great Britain	2:29.95	

Heat 2

Rank	Athlete	Country	Time	Notes
1	Susie Atwood	United States	2:22.13	
2	Deborah Palmer	Australia	2:24.25	
3	Susanne Hilger	East Germany	2:27.88	
4	Susan Hunter	New Zealand	2:28.28	
5	Kikuyo Ishii	Japan	2:29.66	
6	Zdenka Gašparač	Yugoslavia	2:33.57	
7	Christine Fulcher	Ireland	2:33.73	
8	Pat Chan	Singapore	2:41.27	

Heat 3

Rank	Athlete	Country	Time	Notes
1	Leslie Cliff	Canada	2:25.08	
2	Karin Bormann	West Germany	2:25.59	
3	Lynn Skrifvars	United States	2:26.40	
4	Debra Cain	Australia	2:27.14	
5	Josien Elzerman	Netherlands	2:28.18	
6	Kazu Fujimura	Japan	2:30.37	
7	Felicia Ospitaletche	Uruguay	2:37.88	

Heat 4

Rank	Athlete	Country	Time	Notes
1	Enith Brigitha	Netherlands	2:23.70	
2	Donna-Marie Gurr	Canada	2:25.33	
3	Sylvie Le Noach	France	2:27.18	
4	Tina Lek'veishvili	Soviet Union	2:28.22	
5	Susanne Niesner	Switzerland	2:28.62	
6	Pamela Bairstow	Great Britain	2:29.28	
7	María Cecilia Vargas	Mexico	2:37.54	
8	Ong Mei Lin	Malaysia	2:46.40	

Heat 5

Rank	Athlete	Country	Time	Notes
1	Melissa Belote	United States	2:20.58	
2	Christine Herbst	East Germany	2:25.09	
3	Sue Lewis	Australia	2:25.34	
4	Andrea Gyarmati	Hungary	2:25.81	
5	Nataliya Yershova	Soviet Union	2:29.46	
6	Angelika Kraus	West Germany	2:31.16	
7	Patricia López	Argentina	2:33.41	
8	Diana Sutherland	Great Britain	2:37.61	

=== Final ===
Rank	Athlete	Country	Time	Notes
1	Melissa Belote	United States	2:19.19	WR
2	Susie Atwood	United States	2:20.38	
3	Donna Gurr	Canada	2:23.22	
4	Annegret Kober	West Germany	2:23.35	
5	Christine Herbst	East Germany	2:23.44	
6	Enith Brigitha	Netherlands	2:23.70	
7	Deborah Palmer	Australia	2:24.65	
8	Leslie Cliff	Canada	2:25.80	

Key: WR = World record
