= Swimming at the 1972 Summer Olympics – Women's 4 × 100 metre medley relay =

Women's 4 × 100 metre medley relay at the Games of the XX Olympiad
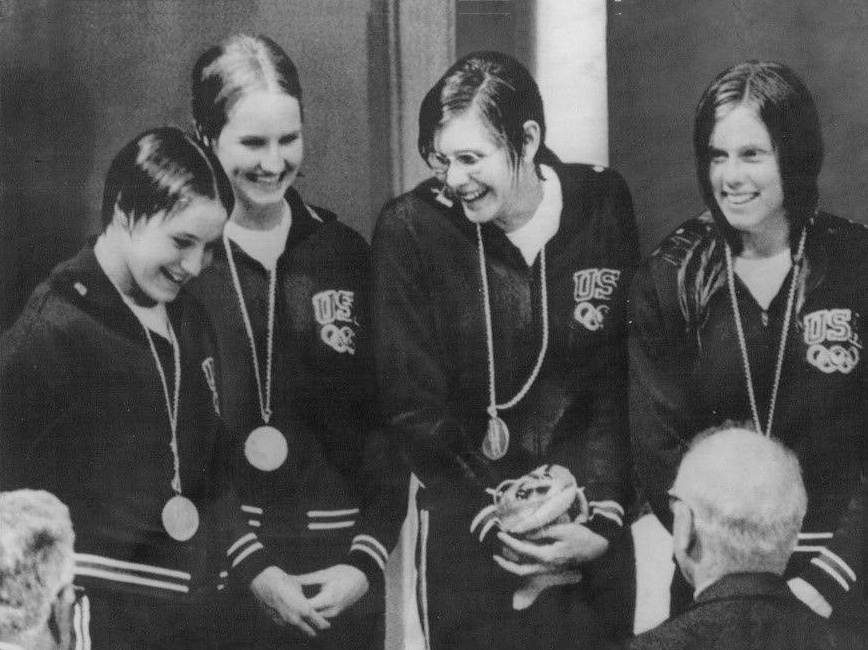
- Left-right: Deena Deardurff, Sandy Neilson, Melissa Belote, and Cathy Carr
- Venue: Olympia Schwimmhalle
- Date: 3 September 1972 (heats & final)
- Competitors: 73 from 16 nations
- Teams: 16
- Winning time: 4:20.75 WR

Medalists
1st place, gold medalist(s)		Melissa Belote, Cathy Carr, Deena Deardurff, Sandy Neilson, Susie Atwood*, Judy Melick*, Dana Shrader*, Shirley Babashoff*	United States
2nd place, silver medalist(s)		Christine Herbst, Renate Vogel, Roswitha Beier, Kornelia Ender	East Germany
3rd place, bronze medalist(s)		Silke Pielen, Vreni Eberle, Gudrun Beckmann, Heidi Reineck, Annegret Kober*, Edeltraud Koch*, Jutta Weber*; *Indicates the swimmer only competed in the preliminary heats.	West Germany

The women's 4 × 100 metre medley relay event at the 1972 Olympic Games took place on September 3. This swimming event uses medley swimming as a relay. Because an Olympic size swimming pool is 50 metres long, each of the four swimmers completed two lengths of the pool, each using a different stroke. The first on each team used the backstroke, the second used the breaststroke, the third used the butterfly stroke, and the final swimmer used freestyle (restricted to not allow any of the first three strokes to be used, though nearly all swimmers use front crawl regardless).

The first swimmer must touch the wall before the next can leave the starting block, and so forth; timing of the starts is thus important.

== Results ==
=== Heats ===
Heat 1

Place	Swimmers	Time	Notes
1	Tina Lek'veishvili, Halyna Prozumenshchykova-Stepanova, Iryna Ustymenko, Tatyana Zolotnitskaya (URS)	4:30.35	
2	Diana Olsson, Britt-Marie Smedh, Eva Wikner, Anita Zarnowiecki (SWE)	4:31.88	
3	Enith Brigitha, Alie te Riet, Frieke Buys, Anke Rijnders (NED)	4:32.20	
4	Heidi Reineck, Annegret Kober, Edeltraud Koch, Jutta Weber (FRG)	4:33.37	
5	Sue Lewis, Beverley Whitfield, Sue Funch, Sharon Booth (AUS)	4:33.96	
6	Ildikó Szekeres, Ágnes Kaczander-Kiss, Judit Turóczy, Magdolna Patóh (HUN)	4:36.53	
7	Christine Fulcher, Ann O'Connor, Brenda McGrory, Aisling O'Leary (IRL)	4:45.56	
8	Alessandra Finesso, Patrizia Miserini, Donatella Talpo-Schiavon, Laura Podestà (ITA)	4:48.25	

Heat 2

Place	Swimmers	Time	Notes
1	Susie Atwood, Judy Melick, Dana Shrader, Shirley Babashoff (USA)	4:27.57	
2	Christine Herbst, Renate Vogel, Roswitha Beier, Gabriele Wetzko (GDR)	4:27.58	
3	Suzuko Matsumura, Yoko Yamamoto, Mayumi Aoki, Yoshimi Nishigawa (JPN)	4:30.34	NR
4	Wendy Cook-Hogg, Sylvia Dockerill, Marilyn Corson, Leslie Cliff (CAN)	4:31.87	
5	Pamela Bairstow, Dorothy Harrison, Jean Jeavons, Lesley Allardice (GBR)	4:34.61	
6	Susanne Niesner, Margrit Thomet, Erika Rüegg, Françoise Monod (SUI)	4:34.69	
7	Sylvie Le Noach, Martine Claret, Josiane Castiau, Claude Mandonnaud (FRA)	4:38.62	
8	María Teresa Ramírez, Ana Elena de la Portilla, Norma Amezcua, Marcia Arriaga (MEX)	4:49.23	

=== Final ===
Place	Swimmers	Time	Notes
1	Melissa Belote, Cathy Carr, Deena Deardurff, Sandy Neilson (USA)	4:20.75	WR
2	Christine Herbst, Renate Vogel, Roswitha Beier, Kornelia Ender (GDR)	4:24.91	
3	Silke Pielen, Vreni Eberle, Gudrun Beckmann, Heidi Reineck (FRG)	4:26.46	
4	Tina Lek'veishvili, Galina Prozumenshchikova, Iryna Ustymenko, Tatyana Zolotnitskaya (URS)	4:27.81	
5	Enith Brigitha, Alie te Riet, Anke Rijnders, Hansje Bunschoten (NED)	4:29.99	
6	Suzuko Matsumura, Yoko Yamamoto, Mayumi Aoki, Yoshimi Nishigawa (JPN)	4:30.18	NR
7	Wendy Cook-Hogg, Sylvia Dockerill, Marilyn Corson, Leslie Cliff (CAN)	4:31.56	
8	Diana Olsson, Britt-Marie Smedh, Eva Wikner, Anita Zarnowiecki (SWE)	4:32.61	
