= Swimming at the 1973 World Aquatics Championships – Women's 100 metre backstroke =

Women's 100 metre backstroke at the 1973 World Aquatics Championships
- Dates: September 5, 1973
- Competitors: 24 from 17 nations
- Winning time: 1:05.427

Medalists
| gold medal | Ulrike Richter | East Germany |
| silver medal | Melissa Belote | United States |
| bronze medal | Wendy Cook | Canada |

The women's 100 metre backstroke competition of the swimming events at the 1973 World Aquatics Championships took place on September 5.

== Records ==
Prior to the competition, the existing world and championship records were as follows.

| World record | Ulrike Richter (GDR) | 1:05.39 | Utrecht, Netherlands | 18 August 1973 |
| Competition record | N/A | N/A | N/A | N/A |

The following records were established during the competition:

| Date | Event | Name | Nationality | Time | Record |
|---|---|---|---|---|---|
| 5 September | Heat 1 | Andrea Gyarmati | Hungary | 1:06.09 | CR |
| 5 September | Heat 4 | Ulrike Richter | East Germany | 1:06.08 | CR |
| 5 September | Final | Ulrike Richter | East Germany | 1:05.42 | CR |

== Results ==
=== Heats ===
24 swimmers participated in 4 heats, qualified swimmers are listed:

| Rank | Heat | Lane | Name | Nationality | Time | Notes |
|---|---|---|---|---|---|---|
| 1 | 4 | - | Ulrike Richter | East Germany | 1:06.086 | Q, CR |
| 2 | 1 | - | Andrea Gyarmati | Hungary | 1:06.099 | Q, CR |
| 3 | 3 | - | Melissa Belote | United States | 1:06.231 | Q |
| 4 | 2 | - | Wendy Cook | Canada | 1:06.275 | Q |
| 5 | 4 | - | Enith Brigitha | Netherlands | 1:06.996 | Q |
| 6 | 4 | - | Linda Stimpson | United States | 1:07.250 | Q |
| 7 | 1 | - | Josien Elzerman | Netherlands | 1:07.519 | Q |
| 8 | 3 | - | Christine Herbst | East Germany | 1:07.981 | Q |
| 9 | 2 | - | Sylvie Le Noach | France | 1:07.986 | |
| 10 | 2 | - | Linda Young | Australia | 1:08.010 | |
| 11 | 1 | - | Angelika Grieser | West Germany | 1:08.468 | |
| 12 | 3 | - | Donna-Marie Gurr | Canada | 1:08.640 | |
| 13 | 4 | - | Diana Olsson | Sweden | 1:08.745 | |
| 14 | 1 | - | Antonella Roncelli | Italy | 1:08.945 | |
| 15 | 1 | - | Sue Lewis | Australia | 1:09.541 | |
| 16 | 4 | - | P. Torrisi | Italy | 1:10.165 | |
| 17 | 3 | - | F. Chaunin | Belgium | 1:10.902 | |
| 18 | 3 | - | E. Kobielska | Poland | 1:11.758 | |
| 19 | 2 | - | H. Jaqueti | Spain | 1:12.431 | |
| 20 | 1 | - | D. McSwain | Puerto Rico | 1:12.432 | |
| 21 | 2 | - | I. Golovanova | Soviet Union | 1:12.585 | |
| 22 | 2 | - | B. Fernandes | Brazil | 1:13.109 | |
| 23 | 4 | - | María Mock | Puerto Rico | 1:17.270 | |
| 24 | 2 | - | R. Okan | Turkey | 1:17.723 | |

=== Final ===
The results of the final are below.

| Rank | Lane | Name | Nationality | Time | Notes |
|---|---|---|---|---|---|
| 1st place, gold medalist(s) | - | Ulrike Richter | East Germany | 1:05.427 | |
| 2nd place, silver medalist(s) | - | Melissa Belote | United States | 1:06.112 | |
| 3rd place, bronze medalist(s) | - | Wendy Cook | Canada | 1:06.271 | |
| 4 | - | Andrea Gyarmati | Hungary | 1:06.549 | |
| 5 | - | Enith Brigitha | Netherlands | 1:06.550 | |
| 6 | - | Christine Herbst | East Germany | 1:07.465 | |
| 7 | - | Linda Stimpson | United States | 1:07.698 | |
| 8 | - | Josien Elzerman | Netherlands | 1:07.900 | |
