= United States at the 1972 Summer Olympics =

- Flag of the United States
- IOC code: USA
- NOC: United States Olympic Committee

in Munich
- Competitors: 400 (316 men and 84 women) in 21 sports
- Flag bearer: Olga Connolly
- Medals Ranked 2nd: Gold 33 Silver 31 Bronze 30 Total 94

Summer Olympics appearances (overview)
- 1896; 1900; 1904; 1908; 1912; 1920; 1924; 1928; 1932; 1936; 1948; 1952; 1956; 1960; 1964; 1968; 1972; 1976; 1980; 1984; 1988; 1992; 1996; 2000; 2004; 2008; 2012; 2016; 2020; 2024

Other related appearances
- 1906 Intercalated Games

The United States competed at the 1972 Summer Olympics in Munich, West Germany. 400 competitors, 316 men and 84 women, took part in 185 events in 21 sports.

== Medalists ==
The United States finished second in the final medal rankings, with 33 gold and 94 total medals.

The following U.S. competitors won medals at the games. In the discipline sections below, the medalists' names are bolded.

Medal	Name	Sport	Event	Date
Gold	Micki King	Diving	Women's 3 m springboard	August 28
Gold	Mark Spitz	Swimming	Men's 200 m butterfly	August 28
Gold	Gary Conelly^{[a]} Dave Edgar; David Fairbank^{[a]} Jerry Heidenreich; John Murphy; Mark Spitz	Swimming	Men's 4 × 100 m freestyle relay	August 28
Gold	Mark Spitz	Swimming	Men's 200 m freestyle	August 29
Gold	Sandy Neilson	Swimming	Women's 100 m freestyle	August 29
Gold	John Writer	Shooting	50 m rifle three positions	August 30
Gold	Shirley Babashoff; Jane Barkman; Jenny Kemp; Ann Marshall^{[a]} Sandy Neilson; Kim Peyton^{[a]} Lynn Skrifvars^{[a]}	Swimming	Women's 4 × 100 m freestyle relay	August 30
Gold	Mark Spitz	Swimming	Men's 100 m butterfly	August 31
Gold	Mike Burton^{[a]} Gary Conelly^{[a]} Steve Genter; John Kinsella; Tom McBreen^{[a]} Mark Spitz; Fred Tyler	Swimming	Men's 4 × 200 m freestyle relay	August 31
Gold	Dan Gable	Wrestling	Freestyle 68 kg	August 31
Gold	Wayne Wells	Wrestling	Freestyle 74 kg	August 31
Gold	Ben Peterson	Wrestling	Freestyle 90 kg	August 31
Gold	Dave Wottle	Athletics	Men's 800 m	September 2
Gold	Lones Wigger	Shooting	300 m rifle three position	September 2
Gold	John Hencken	Swimming	Men's 200 m breaststroke	September 2
Gold	Melissa Belote	Swimming	Women's 100 m backstroke	September 2
Gold	Cathy Carr	Swimming	Women's 100 m breaststroke	September 2
Gold	Mark Spitz	Swimming	Men's 100 m freestyle	September 3
Gold	Keena Rothhammer	Swimming	Women's 800 m freestyle	September 3
Gold	Susie Atwood^{[a]} Shirley Babashoff^{[a]} Melissa Belote; Cathy Carr; Deena Deardurff; Judy Melick^{[a]} Sandy Neilson; Dana Shrader^{[a]}	Swimming	Women's 4 × 100 m medley relay	September 3
Gold	Mike Burton	Swimming	Men's 1500 m freestyle	September 4
Gold	Tom Bruce; David Fairbank^{[a]} Gary Hall Sr.^{[a]} Jerry Heidenreich; John Hencken^{[a]} Mitch Ivey^{[a]} Mark Spitz; Mike Stamm	Swimming	Men's 4 × 100 m medley relay	September 4
Gold	Melissa Belote	Swimming	Women's 200 m backstroke	September 4
Gold	Karen Moe	Swimming	Women's 200 m butterfly	September 4
Gold	Vincent Matthews	Athletics	Men's 400 m	September 7
Gold	Rod Milburn	Athletics	Men's 110 m hurdles	September 7
Gold	William Allen; William Bentsen; Buddy Melges	Sailing	Soling	September 8
Gold	Randy Williams	Athletics	Men's long jump	September 9
Gold	John Williams	Archery	Men's individual	September 10
Gold	Doreen Wilber	Archery	Women's individual	September 10
Gold	Larry Black; Eddie Hart; Robert Taylor; Gerald Tinker	Athletics	Men's 4 × 100 m relay	September 10
Gold	Frank Shorter	Athletics	Men's marathon	September 10
Gold	Ray Seales	Boxing	Light welterweight	September 10
Silver	Victor Auer	Shooting	50 m rifle prone	August 28
Silver	Gary Hall Sr.	Swimming	Men's 200 m butterfly	August 28
Silver	Steve Genter	Swimming	Men's 200 m freestyle	August 29
Silver	Mike Stamm	Swimming	Men's 100 m backstroke	August 29
Silver	Shirley Babashoff	Swimming	Women's 100 m freestyle	August 29
Silver	Dana Schoenfield	Swimming	Women's 200 m breaststroke	August 29
Silver	Lanny Bassham	Shooting	50 m rifle three position	August 30
Silver	Tom Bruce	Swimming	Men's 100 m breaststroke	August 30
Silver	Tim McKee	Swimming	Men's 400 m individual medley	August 30
Silver	Richard Sanders	Wrestling	Freestyle 57 kg	August 31
Silver	John Peterson	Wrestling	Freestyle 82 kg	August 31
Silver	Robert Taylor	Athletics	Men's 100 m	September 1
Silver	Bruce Davidson; Kevin Freeman; Michael Plumb; James C. Wofford	Equestrian	Team eventing	September 1
Silver	Steve Genter	Swimming	Men's 400 m freestyle	September 1
Silver	Shirley Babashoff	Swimming	Women's 200 m freestyle	September 1
Silver	Ralph Mann	Athletics	Men's 400 m hurdles	September 2
Silver	Bob Seagren	Athletics	Men's pole vault	September 2
Silver	Jay Silvester	Athletics	Men's discus throw	September 2
Silver	Gene Clapp; Bill Hobbs; Franklin Hobbs; Cleve Livingston; Mike Livingston; Tim Mickelson; Pete Raymond; Lawrence Terry	Rowing	Men's eight	September 2
Silver	Mike Stamm	Swimming	Men's 200 m backstroke	September 2
Silver	Jerry Heidenreich	Swimming	Men's 100 m freestyle	September 3
Silver	Tim McKee	Swimming	Men's 200 m individual medley	September 3
Silver	Larry Black	Athletics	Men's 200 m	September 4
Silver	Richard Rydze	Diving	Men's 10 m platform	September 4
Silver	Susie Atwood	Swimming	Women's 200 m backstroke	September 4
Silver	Lynn Colella	Swimming	Women's 200 m butterfly	September 4
Silver	Wayne Collett	Athletics	Men's 400 m	September 7
Silver	George Woods	Athletics	Men's shot put	September 9
Silver	United States men's national basketball team: Mike Bantom; Jim Brewer; Tommy Burleson; Doug Collins; Kenny Davis; James Forbes; Tom Henderson; Bobby Jones; Dwight Jones; Kevn Joyce; Tom McMillen; Ed Ratleff	Basketball	Men's tournament	September 9
Silver	Mable Fergerson; Kathy Hammond; Madeline Manning; Cheryl Toussaint	Athletics	Women's 4 × 400 m relay	September 10
Silver	Frank Chapot; Kathryn Kusner; Neal Shapiro; William Steinkraus	Equestrian	Team jumping	September 11
Bronze	Jamie McEwan	Canoeing	Men's slalom C-1	August 28
Bronze	Robin Backhaus	Swimming	Men's 200 m butterfly	August 28
Bronze	Lynn Vidali	Swimming	Women's 200 m individual medley	August 28
Bronze	John Murphy	Swimming	Men's 100 m backstroke	August 29
Bronze	Craig Lincoln	Diving	Men's 3 m springboard	August 30
Bronze	John Hencken	Swimming	Men's 100 m breaststroke	August 30
Bronze	Jerry Heidenreich	Swimming	Men's 100 m butterfly	August 31
Bronze	Chris Taylor	Wrestling	Freestyle +100 kg	August 31
Bronze	Kate Schmidt	Athletics	Women's javelin throw	September 1
Bronze	Tom McBreen	Swimming	Men's 400 m freestyle	September 1
Bronze	Keena Rothhammer	Swimming	Women's 200 m freestyle	September 1
Bronze	Jan Johnson	Athletics	Men's pole vault	September 2
Bronze	Mitch Ivey	Swimming	Men's 200 m backstroke	September 2
Bronze	Susie Atwood	Swimming	Women's 100 m backstroke	September 2
Bronze	Larry Young	Athletics	Men's 50 km walk	September 3
Bronze	Bill Schmidt	Athletics	Men's javelin throw	September 3
Bronze	Neal Shapiro	Equestrian	Individual jumping	September 3
Bronze	Steve Furniss	Swimming	Men's 200 m individual medley	September 3
Bronze	Doug Northway	Swimming	Men's 1500 m freestyle	September 4
Bronze	Ellie Daniel	Swimming	Women's 200 m butterfly	September 4
Bronze	United States men's national water polo team: Peter Asch; Steve Barnett; Bruce Bradley; Stan Cole; Jim Ferguson; Eric Lindroth; John Parker; Gary Sheerer; James Slatton; Russ Webb; Barry Weitzenberg	Water polo	Men's tournament	September 4
Bronze	Tom Hill	Athletics	Men's 110 m hurdles	September 7
Bronze	Kathy Hammond	Athletics	Women's 400 m	September 7
Bronze	Peter Dean; Glen Foster	Sailing	Tempest	September 8
Bronze	Donald Cohan; Charles Horter; John Marshall	Sailing	Dragon	September 8
Bronze	Arnie Robinson	Athletics	Men's long jump	September 9
Bronze	Dwight Stones	Athletics	Men's high jump	September 10
Bronze	Ricardo Carreras	Boxing	Bantamweight	September 10
Bronze	Jesse Valdez	Boxing	Welterweight	September 10
Bronze	Marvin Johnson	Boxing	Middleweight	September 10

Medals by sport
Sport	1st place, gold medalist(s)	2nd place, silver medalist(s)	3rd place, bronze medalist(s)	Total
Swimming	17	14	12	**43**
Athletics	6	8	8	**22**
Wrestling	3	2	1	**6**
Shooting	2	2	0	**4**
Archery	2	0	0	**2**
Diving	1	1	1	**3**
Boxing	1	0	3	**4**
Sailing	1	0	2	**3**
Equestrian	0	2	1	**3**
Basketball	0	1	0	**1**
Rowing	0	1	0	**1**
Canoeing	0	0	1	**1**
Water polo	0	0	1	**1**
Total	33	31	30	94

Medals by day
Day	Date	1st place, gold medalist(s)	2nd place, silver medalist(s)	3rd place, bronze medalist(s)	Total
1	August 27	0	0	0	**0**
2	August 28	3	2	3	**8**
3	August 29	2	4	1	**7**
4	August 30	2	3	2	**7**
5	August 31	5	2	2	**9**
6	September 1	0	4	3	**7**
7	September 2	5	5	3	**13**
8	September 3	3	2	4	**9**
9	September 4	4	4	3	**11**
10	September 6	0	0	0	**0**
11	September 7	2	1	2	**5**
12	September 8	1	0	2	**3**
13	September 9	1	2	1	**4**
14	September 10	5	1	4	**10**
15	September 11	0	1	0	**1**
Total		33	31	30	94

Medals by gender
Gender	1st place, gold medalist(s)	2nd place, silver medalist(s)	3rd place, bronze medalist(s)	Total	Percentage
Male	23	24	24	**71**	75.53%
Female	10	6	6	**22**	23.41%
Mixed	0	1	0	**1**	1.06%
Total	33	31	30	94	100%

Multiple medalists
Name	Sport	1st place, gold medalist(s)	2nd place, silver medalist(s)	3rd place, bronze medalist(s)	Total
Mark Spitz	Swimming	7	0	0	**7**
Shirley Babashoff	Swimming	2	2	0	**4**
Jerry Heidenreich	Swimming	2	1	1	**4**
Melissa Belote	Swimming	3	0	0	**3**
Sandy Neilson	Swimming	3	0	0	**3**
John Hencken	Swimming	2	0	1	**3**
Steve Genter	Swimming	1	2	0	**3**
Mike Stamm	Swimming	1	2	0	**3**
Susie Atwood	Swimming	1	1	1	**3**
Mike Burton	Swimming	2	0	0	**2**
Cathy Carr	Swimming	2	0	0	**2**
Gary Conelly	Swimming	2	0	0	**2**
David Fairbank	Swimming	2	0	0	**2**
Larry Black	Athletics	1	1	0	**2**
Tom Bruce	Swimming	1	1	0	**2**
Gary Hall Sr.	Swimming	1	1	0	**2**
Mitch Ivey	Swimming	1	0	1	**2**
Tom McBreen	Swimming	1	0	1	**2**
John Murphy	Swimming	1	0	1	**2**
Keena Rothhammer	Swimming	1	0	1	**2**
Tim McKee	Swimming	0	2	0	**2**
Kathy Hammond	Athletics	0	1	1	**2**
Neal Shapiro	Equestrian	0	1	1	**2**

^{a} Athletes who participated in the heats only.

== Archery ==
In the first modern archery competition at the Olympics, the United States entered three men and three women. They took home both of the gold medals as well as a pair of 5th-place finishes.

Athlete	Event	Round 1		Round 2		Total	
Athlete	Event	Points	Rank	Points	Rank	Points	Rank
Edwin Eliason	Men's individual	1193	13	1245	4	2348	5
Dennis McComak	Men's individual	1199	9	1199	16	2398	11
John Williams	Men's individual	1268 OR	1	1260	1	2528 OR	1st place, gold medalist(s)
Maureen Bechdolt	Women's individual	1106	29	1112	29	2218	28
Linda Myers	Women's individual	1200	3	1185	6	2385	5
Doreen Wilber	Women's individual	1198	4	1226 OR	1	2424 OR	1st place, gold medalist(s)

== Athletics ==
On the victory podium after the conclusion of the men's 400 meters final, gold medalist Vince Matthews and silver medalist Wayne Collett talked to each other and failed to stand at attention during the medal ceremony. On the advice of Avery Brundage, the International Olympic Committee banned them from further competition. Since the third American competitor, world record holder John Smith, had pulled a hamstring while leading 80 meters into the final and had been ruled unfit to run, the United States were left unable to field a 4 x 400 relay team, and were thus forced to scratch from the event where they would have been heavily favored.

Key

- Note–Ranks given for track events are within the athlete's heat only
- Q = Qualified for the next round
- q = Qualified for the next round as a fastest loser or, in field events, by position without achieving the qualifying target

Men
Road and track events

Athlete	Event	Heat		Quarterfinal		Semifinal		Final	
Athlete	Event	Time	Rank	Time	Rank	Time	Rank	Time	Rank
Eddie Hart	100 m	10.47	1 Q	DNS		Did not advance			
Rey Robinson	100 m	10.56	1 Q	DNS		Did not advance			
Robert Taylor	100 m	10.32	1 Q	10.16	2 Q	10.30	1 Q	10.24	2nd place, silver medalist(s)
Larry Black	200 m	20.79	1 Q	20.28	1 Q	20.36	1 Q	20.19	2nd place, silver medalist(s)
Larry Burton	200 m	20.80	1 Q	20.68	1 Q	20.78	2 Q	20.37	4
Chuck Smith	200 m	20.79	1 Q	20.66	2 Q	20.86	3 Q	20.55	5
Wayne Collett	400 m	46.00	2 Q	45.80	1 Q	45.77	3 Q	44.80	2nd place, silver medalist(s)
Vincent Matthews	400 m	45.94	2 Q	45.62	2 Q	44.94	1 Q	44.66	1st place, gold medalist(s)
John Smith	400 m	46.00	2 Q	46.04	2 Q	45.46	3 Q	DNF	
Ken Swenson	800 m	1:51.1	2 Q	—N/a		DNF		Did not advance	
Rick Wohlhuter	800 m	1:49.4	4	—N/a		Did not advance			
Dave Wottle	800 m	1:47.6	2 Q	—N/a		1:48.7	1 Q	1:45.9	1st place, gold medalist(s)
Jim Ryun	1500 m	3:51.5	9	—N/a		Did not advance			
Bob Wheeler	1500 m	3:41.3	3 Q	—N/a		3:40.4	6	Did not advance	
Dave Wottle	1500 m	3:40.7	2 Q	—N/a		3:41.6	4	Did not advance	
Leonard Hilton	5000 m	14:07.2	8	—N/a				Did not advance	
Steve Prefontaine	5000 m	13:32.6	2 Q	—N/a				13:28.25	4
George Young	5000 m	13:41.2	4	—N/a				Did not advance	
Jon Anderson	10,000 m	28:34.2	8	—N/a				Did not advance	
Jeff Galloway	10,000 m	29:35.0	11	—N/a				Did not advance	
Frank Shorter	10,000 m	27:58.23	3 Q	—N/a				27:51.32	5
Willie Davenport	110 m hurdles	13.97	2 Q	—N/a		13.73	3 Q	13.50	4
Tom Hill	110 m hurdles	13.62	1 Q	—N/a		13.47	1 Q	13.48	3rd place, bronze medalist(s)
Rod Milburn	110 m hurdles	13.57	1 Q	—N/a		13.44	1 Q	13.24 WR	1st place, gold medalist(s)
Dick Bruggeman	400 m hurdles	54.36	6	—N/a		Did not advance			
Ralph Mann	400 m hurdles	50.18	2 Q	—N/a		49.53	2 Q	48.51	2nd place, silver medalist(s)
Jim Seymour	400 m hurdles	49.81	2 Q	—N/a		49.33	1 Q	48.64	4
Doug Brown	3000 m steeplechase	8:41.2	9	—N/a				Did not advance	
Mike Manley	3000 m steeplechase	8:50.4	10	—N/a				Did not advance	
Steve Savage	3000 m steeplechase	8:39.0	7	—N/a				Did not advance	
Larry Black; Eddie Hart; Robert Taylor; Gerald Tinker	4 × 100 m relay	38.96	1 Q	—N/a		38.54	1 Q	38.19 WR	1st place, gold medalist(s)
Jack Bacheler	Marathon	—N/a						2:17:38	9
Kenny Moore	Marathon	—N/a						2:15:39	4
Frank Shorter	Marathon	—N/a						2:12:19	1st place, gold medalist(s)
Tom Dooley	20 km walk	—N/a						1:34:58.8	15
Goetz Klopfer	20 km walk	—N/a						1:38:33.6	19
Larry Young	20 km walk	—N/a						1:32:53.4	10
Steve Hayden	50 km walk	—N/a						4:36:07.2	27
William Weigle	50 km walk	—N/a						4:22:52.2	17
Larry Young	50 km walk	—N/a						4:00:46.0	3rd place, bronze medalist(s)

Field events

Athlete	Event	Qualification		Final	
Athlete	Event	Result	Rank	Result	Rank
Preston Carrington	Long jump	8.22	2 Q	7.99	5
Arnie Robinson	Long jump	7.99	4 Q	8.03	3rd place, bronze medalist(s)
Randy Williams	Long jump	8.34	1 Q	8.24	1st place, gold medalist(s)
John Craft	Triple jump	16.32	10 Q	16.83	5
Dave Smith	Triple jump	14.55	32	Did not advance	
Art Walker	Triple jump	15.29	29	Did not advance	
Chris Dunn	High jump	2.12	20	Did not advance	
Ron Jourdan	High jump	2.12	22	Did not advance	
Dwight Stones	High jump	2.15	=1 Q	2.21	3rd place, bronze medalist(s)
Jan Johnson	Pole vault	5.10	10 Q	5.35	3rd place, bronze medalist(s)
Bob Seagren	Pole vault	5.10	=6 Q	5.40	2nd place, silver medalist(s)
Steve Smith	Pole vault	4.80	18	Did not advance	
Al Feuerbach	Shot put	19.94	=6 Q	21.01	5
Brian Oldfield	Shot put	19.95	5 Q	20.91	6
George Woods	Shot put	19.96	4 Q	21.17	2nd place, silver medalist(s)
John Powell	Discus throw	59.30	13 Q	62.82	4
Jay Silvester	Discus throw	61.20	6 Q	63.50	2nd place, silver medalist(s)
Tim Vollmer	Discus throw	59.60	10 Q	60.24	8
Fred Luke	Javelin throw	81.34	5 Q	80.06	8
Bill Schmidt	Javelin throw	78.96	10 q	84.42	3rd place, bronze medalist(s)
Milt Sonsky	Javelin throw	79.96	8 q	77.94	10
George Frenn	Hammer throw	62.14	27	Did not advance	
Tom Gage	Hammer throw	69.40	7 Q	69.50	12
Al Schoterman	Hammer throw	65.18	22	Did not advance	

Combined event – Decathlon

Athlete	Event	100 m	LJ	SP	HJ	400 m	110H	DT	PV	JT	1500 m	Points	Rank
Jeff Bannister	Result	11.09	7.20	14.21	1.86	46.79	DQ	42.00	4.00	56.98	4:15.8	7022	21
Jeff Bannister	Points	783	861	741	734	958	0	724	807	724	690	7022	21
Jeff Bennett	Result	10.73	7.26	12.82	1.86	46.25	15.58	36.52	4.80	56.98	4:12.2	7974	4
Jeff Bennett	Points	872	873	653	734	984	789	616	1005	730	718	7974	4
Bruce Jenner	Result	11.35	6.53	13.56	1.92	49.49	15.59	42.24	4.55	66.02	4:18.9	7722	10
Bruce Jenner	Points	721	721	700	788	829	788	729	945	833	668	7722	10

Women
Track events

Athlete	Event	Heat		Quarterfinal		Semifinal		Final	
Athlete	Event	Time	Rank	Time	Rank	Time	Rank	Time	Rank
Iris Davis	100 m	11.34	1 Q	11.27	1 Q	11.36	2 Q	11.32	4
Barbara Ferrell	100 m	11.47	3 Q	11.38	3 Q	11.49	4 Q	11.45	7
Mattiline Render	100 m	11.60	5 Q	11.67	6	Did not advance			
Barbara Ferrell	200 m	23.38	2 Q	23.30	4 Q	23.39	7	Did not advance	
Pam Greene	200 m	23.96	2 Q	23.85	5	Did not advance			
Jackie Thompson	200 m	23.67	3 Q	23.22	3 Q	23.18	6	Did not advance	
Debra Edwards	400 m	54.43	5	Did not advance					
Mable Fergerson	400 m	52.05	3 Q	52.93	3 Q	51.91	4 Q	51.96	5
Kathy Hammond	400 m	53.45	1 Q	52.44	4 Q	51.92	4 Q	51.64	3rd place, bronze medalist(s)
Wendy Koenig	800 m	2:08.71	6	—N/a		Did not advance			
Madeline Manning	800 m	2:02.63	2 Q	—N/a		2:02.39	5	Did not advance	
Cheryl Toussaint	800 m	2:08.90	6	—N/a		Did not advance			
Doris Brown	1500 m	DNS		—N/a		Did not advance			
Francie Kraker	1500 m	4:14.73	4 Q	—N/a		4:12.76	8	Did not advance	
Francie Larrieu	1500 m	4:11.18	3 Q	—N/a		4:15.26	8	Did not advance	
Patty Johnson	100 m hurdles	13.28	2 Q	—N/a		13.26	5	Did not advance	
Lacey O'Neal	100 m hurdles	13.78	4 Q	—N/a		13.89	7	Did not advance	
Mamie Rallins	100 m hurdles	13.51	3 Q	—N/a		13.76	7	Did not advance	
Iris Davis; Mildrette Netter; Mattiline Render; Martha Watson	4 × 100 m relay	43.07	3 Q	—N/a				43.39	4
Mable Fergerson; Kathy Hammond; Madeline Manning; Cheryl Toussaint	4 × 400 m relay	3:28.60	2 Q	—N/a				3:25.15	2nd place, silver medalist(s)

Field events

Athlete	Event	Qualification		Final	
Athlete	Event	Result	Rank	Result	Rank
Kim Attlesey	Long jump	5.80	29	Did not advance	
Martha Watson	Long jump	6.09	23	Did not advance	
Willye White	Long jump	6.39	5 Q	6.27	11
Cindy Gilbert	High jump	1.70	32	Did not advance	
Sandi Goldsberry	High jump	1.60	38	Did not advance	
Deanne Wilson	High jump	1.70	=30	Did not advance	
Maren Seidler	Shot put	16.18	14	Did not advance	
Jan Svendsen	Shot put	14.96	16	Did not advance	
Olga Connolly	Discus throw	51.58	16	Did not advance	
Roberta Brown	Javelin throw	47.88	19	Did not advance	
Sherry Calvert	Javelin throw	51.38	15	Did not advance	
Kate Schmidt	Javelin throw	58.84	3 Q	59.94	3rd place, bronze medalist(s)

Combined event – Pentathlon

Athlete	Event	100H	SP	HJ	LJ	200 m	Points	Rank
Gale Fitzgerald	Result	14.47	11.25	1.65	5.97	23.97	4206	19
Gale Fitzgerald	Points	809	672	885	900	940	4206	19
Jane Frederick	Result	14.60	12.92	1.74	5.60	24.45	4167	21
Jane Frederick	Points	793	775	974	817	808	4167	21

== Basketball ==
Summary

Team	Event	Preliminary round								Semifinal	Final / BM	
Team	Event	Opposition Result	Opposition Result	Opposition Result	Opposition Result	Opposition Result	Opposition Result	Opposition Result	Rank	Opposition Result	Opposition Result	Rank
United States men	Men's tournament	Czechoslovakia; W 66–35	Australia; W 81–55	Cuba; W 67–48	Brazil; W 61–54	Egypt; W 96–31	Spain; W 74–70	Japan; W 99–33	1 Q	Italy; W 68–38	Soviet Union; L 50–51	2nd place, silver medalist(s)

Roster

The following players represented the United States:

- Kenny Davis
- Doug Collins
- Tom Henderson
- Mike Bantom
- Bobby Jones
- Dwight Jones
- Jim Forbes
- Jim Brewer
- Tommy Burleson
- Tom McMillen
- Kevin Joyce
- Ed Ratleff

Preliminary round

Pos	Team	Pld	W	L	PF	PA	PD	Pts	Qualification
1	United States	7	7	0	542	312	+230	14	Semifinals
2	Cuba	7	6	1	560	445	+115	13	Semifinals
3	Brazil	7	4	3	561	490	+71	11 (Note: Head-to-head record: Brazil 1–0 Czechoslovakia)	5th–8th classification round
4	Czechoslovakia	7	4	3	493	489	+4	11	5th–8th classification round
5	Spain	7	3	4	486	500	−14	10 (Note: Head-to-head record: Spain 1–0 Australia)	9th–12th classification round
6	Australia	7	3	4	523	524	−1	10	9th–12th classification round
7	Japan	7	1	6	442	643	−201	8	13th–16th classification round
8	Egypt	7	0	7	440	644	−204	7	13th–16th classification round

Source: FIBA archive
Rules for classification: 1) points; 2) head-to-head points; 3) head-to-head goal average; 4) head-to-head number of points scored.
Notes:

August 27
12:00

United States	66–35	Czechoslovakia

Rudi-Sedlmayer-Halle, Munich

August 28
14:30

United States	81–55	Australia

Rudi-Sedlmayer-Halle, Munich

August 29
21:30

United States	67–48	Cuba

Rudi-Sedlmayer-Halle, Munich

August 30
21:30

Brazil	54–61	United States

Rudi-Sedlmayer-Halle, Munich

September 1
21:30

Egypt	31–96	United States

Rudi-Sedlmayer-Halle, Munich

September 2
18:30

Spain	56–72	United States

Rudi-Sedlmayer-Halle, Munich

September 3
9:00

Japan	33–99	United States

Rudi-Sedlmayer-Halle, Munich

== Boxing ==
Reggie Jones was controversially eliminated in the second round of the light middleweight division (–71 kg) by Valeri Tregubov of the Soviet Union, nine years his senior, in a fight he was generally accepted to have won.

Athlete	Event	Round 1	Round 2	Round 3	Quarterfinal	Semifinal	Final	
Athlete	Event	Opposition Result	Opposition Result	Opposition Result	Opposition Result	Opposition Result	Opposition Result	Rank
Davey Armstrong	Light flyweight	Dorgu (TUR); W 4–1	Rodríguez (ESP); L 0–5	—N/a	Did not advance			=9
Tim Dement	Flyweight	Bye	Gharbi (TUN); W 5–0	Perez (COL); L 0–5	Did not advance			=9
Ricardo Carreras	Bantamweight	Bye	O'Brien (AUS); W TKO	Ganbat (MGL); W 3–2	Solomin (URS); W 3–2	Zamora (MEX); L 1–4	Did not advance	3rd place, bronze medalist(s)
Louis Self	Featherweight	Apeang (FRA); W 5–0	Theotokatos (GRE); W 5–0	Botos (HUN); L 2–3	Did not advance			=9
James Busceme	Lightweight	Bye	Vichit (THA); W 5–0	Szczepański (POL); L 0–5	Did not advance			=9
Ray Seales	Light welterweight	Beyer (GDR); W 3–2	Montague (IRL); W 5–0	—N/a	Molina (CUB); W 3–2	Vujin (YUG); W 5–0	Angelov (BUL); W 3–2	1st place, gold medalist(s)
Jesse Valdez	Welterweight	Kalipe (TOG); W 5–0	Burga (PER); W 4–1	Jackson (UGA); W 4–1	Khohlov (URS); W 5–0	Correa (CUB); L 2–3	Did not advance	3rd place, bronze medalist(s)
Reggie Jones	Light middleweight	Bye	Tregubov (URS); L 2–3	Did not advance				=17
Marvin Johnson	Middleweight	Bye	Jarmer (FRG); W 5–0	—N/a	Montoya (CUB); W 5–0	Lemeshev (URS); L TKO	Did not advance	3rd place, bronze medalist(s)
Ray Russell	Light heavyweight	Thega (KEN); W TKO	Gortat (POL); L 2–3	—N/a	Did not advance			=9
Duane Bobick	Heavyweight	Nesterov (URS); W 5–0	—N/a		Stevenson (CUB); L TKO	Did not advance		=5

== Canoeing ==
=== Slalom ===
Men

Athlete	Event	Run 1		Run 2		Best	
Athlete	Event	Time	Rank	Time	Rank	Time	Rank
Jamie McEwan	C-1	421.52	8	335.95	2	335.95	3rd place, bronze medalist(s)
Angus Morrison	C-1	393.77	6	432.88	10	393.77	10
Wickliffe Walker	C-1	494.40	12	399.76	9	399.76	11
John Burton; Tom Southworth	C-2	427.83	10	407.55	6	407.55	12
John Evans; Russ Nichols	C-2	522.02	13	440.08	9	440.08	14
Sandy Campbell	K-1	500.62	35	381.99	23	381.99	28
Eric Evans	K-1	296.34	4	299.15	5	296.34	7
John Holland	K-1	345.19	15	337.82	14	337.82	19

Women

Athlete	Event	Run 1		Run 2		Best	
Athlete	Event	Time	Rank	Time	Rank	Time	Rank
Lyn Ashton	K-1	481.45	6	475.41	7	475.41	9
Cynthia Goodwin	K-1	576.80	15	528.50	11	528.50	14
Louise Holcombe	K-1	697.20	19	532.30	12	532.30	15

=== Sprint ===
Athlete	Event	Heat		Repechage		Semifinal		Final	
Athlete	Event	Time	Rank	Time	Rank	Time	Rank	Time	Rank
András Törő	Men's C-1 1000 m	439.92	5 SF	—N/a		4:25.23	6	Did not advance	
Roland Muhlen; Andreas Weigand	Men's C-2 1000 m	4:16.50	6 R	4:02.01	2 SF	3:52.25	2 QF	4:01.28	6
Robert Mitchell	Men's K-1 1000 m	4:15.76	7 R	4:02.43	4	Did not advance			
John Brosius; Alan Whitney	Men's K-2 1000 m	3:55.38	7 R	3:47.91	2 SF	3:46.43	6	Did not advance	
Stephen Kelly; Philip Rogosheske; John van Dyke; Jerry Welborn	Men's K-4 1000 m	3:32.94	7 R	3:22.89	4	Did not advance			
Marcia Smoke	Women's K-1 500 m	2:12.43	4 R	2:06.19	1 SF	2:09.13	2 QF	2:07.98	9
Linda Murray; Nancy Purves	Women's K-2 500 m	2:11.50	6 SF	—N/a		2:01.27	4	Did not advance	

Key: QF - Qualified to medal final; SF - Qualified to semifinal; R - Qualified to repechage

== Cycling ==
Fifteen cyclists represented the United States in 1972.

=== Road ===
Athlete	Event	Time	Rank
John Allis	Road race	4:17:09	63
John Howard	Road race	4:17:09	61
Robert Schneider	Road race	DNF	
Emile Waldteufel	Road race	DNF	
Richard Ball; John Howard; Ron Skarin; Wayne Stetina	Team time trial	2:17:06.4	15

=== Track ===
Pursuit

Athlete	Event	Qualifying		Quarterfinal	Semifinal	Final / BM	
Athlete	Event	Time	Rank	Opposition Result	Opposition Result	Opposition Result	Rank
John Vande Velde	Individual	4:32.87	12	Did not advance			
David Chauner; David Mulica; Jim Ochowicz; John Vande Velde	Team	4:38.19	17	Did not advance			

Sprint

Athlete	Event	Round 1	Repechage 1	Round 2	Repechage 2	Round of 16	Repechage 3	Quarterfinal	Semifinal	Final / BM	
Athlete	Event	Opposition Result	Opposition Result	Opposition Result	Opposition Result	Opposition Result	Opposition Result	Opposition Result	Opposition Result	Opposition Result	Rank
Jeffrey Spencer	Sprint	Cho (JPN), Quintyn (FRA); L	Edwards (BAR); W 12.46	Cooke (GBR), Kravtsov (URS); L	Kučírek (TCH); L	Did not advance					=9
Roger Young	Sprint	Burnside (BAH), Marion (ITA); L	Reece (BAR); W 11.99	King (TRI), Kučírek (TCH); L	Cardi (ITA); L	Did not advance					=9
Jeffrey Spencer; Ralph Therrio	Tandem	Semenets / Tselovlnikov (URS); L	Díaz / Narváez (COL), Snellinx / Soetaert (BEL); L	—N/a				Did not advance			13

Time trial

Athlete	Event	Time	Rank
Steven Woznick	1 km time trial	1:08.56	12

== Diving ==
Men

Athlete	Event	Preliminary		Final		Total	
Athlete	Event	Points	Rank	Points	Rank	Points	Rank
David Bush	3 m springboard	327.06	20	Did not advance			
Michael Finneran	3 m springboard	378.84	7 Q	178.50	5	557.34	5
Craig Lincoln	3 m springboard	386.79	4 Q	190.50	3	577.29	3rd place, bronze medalist(s)
Richard Earley	10 m platform	287.94	12 Q	174.51	2	462.45	6
Michael Finneran	10 m platform	289.80	11 Q	140.67	11	439.47	9
Richard Rydze	10 m platform	302.16	5 Q	178.59	1	480.75	2nd place, silver medalist(s)

Women

Athlete	Event	Preliminary		Final		Total	
Athlete	Event	Points	Rank	Points	Rank	Points	Rank
Janet Ely	3 m springboard	269.91	9 Q	151.08	3	420.99	4
Micki King	3 m springboard	289.14	3 Q	160.89	1	450.03	1st place, gold medalist(s)
Cynthia Potter	3 m springboard	264.90	10 Q	148.68	4	413.58	7
Janet Ely	10 m platform	204.33	6 Q	148.35	3	352.68	4
Micki King	10 m platform	205.08	5 Q	141.30	5	346.38	5
Cynthia Potter	10 m platform	173.82	21	Did not advance			

== Equestrian ==
Dressage

Athlete	Horse	Event	Grand Prix		Ride-off	
Athlete	Horse	Event	Points	Rank	Points	Rank
Edith Master	Dahlwitz	Individual	1480	=18	Did not advance	
Lois Stephens	Fasching	Individual	1345	31	Did not advance	
John Winnett	Reinald	Individual	1458	22	Did not advance	
Edith Master; Lois Stephens; John Winnett	As above	Team	4283	9	—N/a	

Eventing

Athlete	Horse	Event	Dressage		Cross-country		Jumping		Total	
Athlete	Horse	Event	Points	Rank	Points	Rank	Points	Rank	Points	Rank
Bruce Davidson	Plain Sailing	Individual	–40.33	9	34.47	6	–10.00	=16	24.47	8
Kevin Freeman	Good Mixture	Individual	–51.33	=19	39.87	3	–10.00	=16	29.87	5
Michael Plumb	Free and Easy	Individual	–38.33	5	–33.53	22	–10.00	=16	–45.53	20
James Wofford	Kilkenny	Individual	–53.33	=26	–99.33	32	–0.50	13	–99.83	30
Bruce Davidson; Kevin Freeman; Michael Plumb; James Wofford	As above	Team	–129.99	3	170.80	=3	–20.50	3	10.81	2nd place, silver medalist(s)

Jumping

Athlete	Horse	Event	Round 1		Round 2		Total		Jump-off	
Athlete	Horse	Event	Faults	Rank	Faults	Rank	Faults	Rank	Faults	Rank
Kathryn Kusner	Fleet Apple	Individual	4.00	=4 Q	16.00	13	20.0	=10	Did not advance	
Neal Shaprio	Sloopy	Individual	4.00	=4 Q	4.00	=1	8.00	=1	8.00	3rd place, bronze medalist(s)
William Steinkraus	Snowbound	Individual	12.00	=22	Did not advance					
Frank Chapot; Kathryn Kusner; Neal Shaprio; William Steinkraus	White Lightning; Fleet Apple; Sloopy; Main Spring	Team	16.25	2 Q	16.00	=1	32.25	2nd place, silver medalist(s)	—N/a	

== Fencing ==
19 fencers represented the United States in 1972.

Individual
Men

Athlete	Event	Round 1 pool		Round 2 pool		Quarterfinal pool		Semifinal pool		Final pool					
Athlete	Event	W–L	Rank	W–L	Rank	W–L	Rank	W–L	Rank	Opposition Result	Opposition Result	Opposition Result	Opposition Result	Opposition Result	Rank
Carl Borack	Foil	1–4	5	Did not advance											
Joseph Freeman	Foil	5–1	2 Q	2–3	5	Did not advance									
John Nonna	Foil	0–5	6	Did not advance											
George Masin	Épée	1–4	4 Q	2–3	4	Did not advance									
James Melcher	Épée	2–2	5	Did not advance											
Stephen Netburn	Épée	3–2	4 Q	2–3	5	Did not advance									
Paul Apostol	Sabre	2–3	4 Q	3–2	2 Q	3–2	3 Q	2–3	4	Did not advance					
Alfonso Morales	Sabre	3–2	3 Q	2–3	4 Q	1–4	5	Did not advance							
Alex Orban	Sabre	4–1	2 Q	2–3	4 Q	2–3	5	Did not advance							

Women

Athlete	Event	Round 1 pool		Quarterfinal pool		Semifinal pool		Final pool					
Athlete	Event	W–L	Rank	W–L	Rank	W–L	Rank	Opposition Result	Opposition Result	Opposition Result	Opposition Result	Opposition Result	Rank
Harriet King	Foil	2–3	5	Did not advance									
Ann O'Donnell	Foil	1–4	6	Did not advance									
Ruth White	Foil	2–3	3 Q	1–4	5	Did not advance							

Team

Athlete	Event	Round 1 pool				Round 2	Quarterfinal	Semifinal	Classification pool				Final / BM / Pl.	
Athlete	Event	Opposition Result	Opposition Result	Opposition Result	Rank	Opposition Result	Opposition Result	Opposition Result	Opposition Result	Opposition Result	Opposition Result	Rank	Opposition Result	Rank
Carl Borack; Martin Davis; Joseph Freeman; John Nonna; Tyrone Simmons	Men's foil	Japan; L 4–12	Soviet Union; L 4–12	—N/a	3	—N/a	Did not advance							
Edward Bozek; Paul Makler; George Masin; James Melcher; Stephen Netburn	Men's épée	Thailand; W 9–4	Soviet Union; L 4–12	—N/a	2 Q	Sweden; L 2–9	Did not advance							
Paul Apostol; Robert Dow; Alfonso Morales; Alex Orban	Men's sabre	Cuba; L 7–9	France; L 5–11	—N/a	3	—N/a	Did not advance							
Tatyana Adamovich; Natalia Clovis; Harriet King; Ann O'Donnell; Ruth White	Women's foil	Poland; L 8–8 (43–47)	West Germany; L 2–9	Italy; L 6–10	4	—N/a	Did not advance		—N/a				Did not advance	

== Football ==
Summary

Team	Event	First round				Second round				Final / BM	
Team	Event	Opposition Result	Opposition Result	Opposition Result	Rank	Opposition Result	Opposition Result	Opposition Result	Rank	Opposition Result	Rank
United States men	Men's tournament	Morocco; T 0–0	Malaysia; L 0–3	West Germany; L 0–7	4	Did not advance					14

Roster

Head coach: Bob Guelker

No.	Pos.	Player	DoB	Age	Caps	Club	Tournament games	Tournament goals	Minutes played	Sub off	Sub on	Cards yellow/red
1	GK	Mike Ivanow	Jan 9, 1948	24	0	(United States) University of San Francisco	2	0	180	0	0	0
2	DF	Casey Bahr	Sept 20, 1948	23	0	United States Navy	3	0	270	0	0	0
3	DF	John Bocwinski	Nov 22, 1936	35	0	(United States) Polonia SC	2	0	180	0	0	0
4	MD	Al Trost	Feb 7, 1949	23	0	(United States) St Louis University	2	0	97	0	1	0
5	DF	Horst Stemke	Mar 5, 1942	30	0	(United States) University of Wisconsin	3	0	270	0	0	(yellow card) 1
6	MD	Neil Stam	Jan 7, 1942	30	0	(United States) German-American F.C.	3	0	270	0	0	0
7	FW	Archie Roboostoff	Oct 9, 1951	21	0	(United States) Condordia A.C.	3	0	270	0	0	0
8	FW	Mike Seerey	Oct 23, 1950	22	0	(United States) St Louis University	2	0	180	0	0	0
9	MD	John Carenza	Jan 30, 1950	22	0	(United States) Southern Illinois University	2	0	173	1	0	0
10	DF	Art Demling	Sept 21, 1948	23	0	(United States) Michigan State University	3	0	247	2	0	(yellow card) 1
11	FW	Mani Hernandez	Aug 2, 1948	24	0	(United States) Grenadiers S.C.	2	0	180	0	0	0
12	FW	Steve Gay	Sept 1, 1957	25	0	(United States) UCLA	2	0	78	1	1	0
13	FW	Hugo Salcedo	Jan 25, 1946	26	0	(United States) Compton S.C.	2	0	180	0	0	0
14	MD	Joe Hamm	Nov 1, 1950	21	0	(United States) St Louis University	2	0	106	0	1	0
15	DF	Wally Ziaja	July 2, 1949	23	0	(United States) Bavarian Blue Ribbons	1	0	90	0	0	0
16	FW	Mike Flater	Jan 22, 1951	21	0	(United States) Colorado School of Mines	1	0	62	1	0	0
17	MD	Jim Zylker	Jan 11, 1951	21	0	(United States) San Jose State University	1	0	19	0	1	0
18	FW	Mike Margulis	Aug 30, 1950	21	0		1	0	68	0	1	0
19	GK	Shep Messing	Oct 9, 1949	22	0	(United States) Harvard University	1	0	90	0	0	0

First round

Team	Pld	W	D	L	GF	GA	GD	Pts	Qualification
West Germany	3	3	0	0	13	0	+13	6	Advanced to second round
Morocco	3	1	1	1	6	3	+3	3	Advanced to second round
Malaysia	3	1	0	2	3	9	−6	2	
United States	3	0	1	2	0	10	−10	1	

Source: FIFA
27 August 1972
15:00

Morocco	0–0	United States
	Report

Rosenaustadion, Augsburg
Attendance: 4,000
Referee: Rudi Glöckner (East Germany)

29 August 1972
16:30

Malaysia	3–0	United States
Shaharuddin 14'; Salleh 67'; Wan Zawawi 77'	Report

ESV-Stadion, Ingolstadt
Attendance: 3,000
Referee: Henry Oberg (Norway)

31 August 1972
21:00

West Germany	7–0	United States
Nickel 17', 43', 70', 86'; Hitzfeld 47'; Seliger 62'; Bitz 79'	Report

Olympiastadion, Munich
Attendance: 65,000
Referee: Marco Antonio Dorantes García (Mexico)

== Gymnastics ==
Men
Team

Athlete	Event	Apparatus												Total	
Athlete	Event	F		PH		R		V		PB		HB		Total	
Athlete	Event	C	O	C	O	C	O	C	O	C	O	C	O	Score	Rank
Marshall Avener	Team	8.50	8.90	8.95	9.30	9.15	9.15	8.95	9.15	8.10	9.15	8.15	8.90	103.65	=50
John Crosby	Team	8.95	9.30	7.75	8.85	7.85	9.00	8.90	9.25	8.65	9.25	7.00	8.55	103.30	=77
Jim Culhane	Team	8.35	8.65	8.35	8.90	8.50	8.80	9.10	8.90	8.65	9.00	8.25	8.30	103.75	=72
George Greenfield	Team	8.10	8.95	6.35	8.70	8.85	8.90	8.80	8.60	7.75	9.05	8.80	9.35	102.20	=83
Steve Hug	Team	8.85	8.85	9.15	9.40	9.00	9.05	9.15	9.15	9.10	9.30	9.15	9.30	109.45	=26 Q
Makoto Sakamoto	Team	8.95	9.00	5.35	8.75	9.35	9.30	9.30	9.05	9.30	9.30	9.20	8.85	105.70	56
Total	Team	88.60		85.75		90.25		90.90		89.35		88.50		533.85	10

Individual final

Athlete	Event	Apparatus												Total	
Athlete	Event	F		PH		R		V		PB		HB		Total	
Athlete	Event	P	F	P	F	P	F	P	F	P	F	P	F	Score	Rank
Steve Hug	All-around	8.850	9.050	9.275	9.300	9.025	9.000	9.150	9.150	9.200	8.250	9.225	9.400	108.875	31

Women
Team

Athlete	Event	Apparatus								Total	
Athlete	Event	V		UB		BB		F		Total	
Athlete	Event	C	O	C	O	C	O	C	O	Score	Rank
Kimberly Chace	Team	9.10	9.10	9.10	9.20	9.25	8.95	9.10	9.25	73.05	=18 Q
Linda Metheny	Team	8.95	9.20	9.25	9.10	8.40	9.10	9.15	9.35	72.50	=26
Joan Moore	Team	8.90	9.10	9.00	9.10	9.20	8.65	9.15	9.40	72.50	=26 Q
Roxanne Pierce	Team	8.90	9.25	9.20	9.30	9.00	9.00	8.95	8.95	72.55	25 Q
Cathy Rigby	Team	9.10	9.15	9.20	9.40	9.25	9.35	9.30	9.50	74.25	10 Q
Nancy Thies	Team	9.05	9.10	8.85	9.15	8.90	8.90	8.95	9.05	71.95	=35
Total	Team	90.90		91.90		90.90		92.90		365.90	4

Individual finals

Athlete	Event	Apparatus								Total	
Athlete	Event	V		UB		BB		F		Total	
Athlete	Event	P	F	P	F	P	F	P	F	Score	Rank
Kimberly Chace	All-around	9.100	9.200	9.150	8.400	9.100	9.400	9.175	9.400	72.925	28
Joan Moore	All-around	9.000	9.250	9.050	9.350	8.925	9.100	9.275	9.500	73.450	21
Roxanne Pierce	All-around	9.075	9.300	9.250	9.250	9.000	8.450	8.950	9.200	72.475	33
Cathy Rigby	All-around	9.125	9.400	9.300	9.500	9.300	9.350	9.400	9.550	74.925	10

== Handball ==
The United States, which had lost all three of its games in the first Olympic handball tournament, fared no better in the first round of the second tournament. The Americans lost to Hungary, Yugoslavia, and Japan to finish last place in the division, sending them to the thirteenth- to sixteenth-place consolation round. There, they finally got their first handball win over Spain before being defeated by Denmark.

Summary

Team	Event	Preliminary round				Final round			Classification semifinal	Final / BM / Pl.	
Team	Event	Opposition Result	Opposition Result	Opposition Result	Rank	Opposition Result	Opposition Result	Rank	Opposition Result	Opposition Result	Rank
United States men	Men's tournament	Hungary; L 15–28	Yugoslavia; L 15–25	Japan; L 16–20	4	Did not advance			13-16 semifinal Spain; W 22–20	13th place final Denmark; L 18–19	14

Men's Team Competition:

- United States - 14th place (1–4–0)
- Roster - Richard Abrahamson, Fletcher Abram Jr., Roger Baker, Dennis Berkholtz, Larry Caton, Vincent DiCalogero, Elmer Edes, Thomas Hardiman, Rudolph Matthews, Sandor Rivnyak, James Rogers, Richard Schlesinger, Kevin Serrapede, Robert Sparks, Joel Voelkert, and Harry WinklerThomas Jandris)]

== Judo ==
Athlete	Event	Round 1	Round 2	Round 3	Round 4	Round 5	Repechage 1	Repechage 2	Repechage 3	Semifinal	Final	
Athlete	Event	Opposition Result	Opposition Result	Opposition Result	Opposition Result	Opposition Result	Opposition Result	Opposition Result	Opposition Result	Opposition Result	Opposition Result	Rank
Kenneth Okada	63 kg	—N/a	Byuadaa (MGL); L 00–00 D	Did not advance								=19
Patrick Burris	70 kg	—N/a	Dörbrandt (FRG); L 00–00 D	Did not advance								=18
Irwin Cohen	80 kg	Bye	Gogolauri (URS); L 00–10	Did not advance								=19
Jimmy Wooley	93 kg	—N/a	Marin (PUR); W 10–00	Kim (KOR); W 10–00	Bosman (NED); W 00–00 D	Starbrook (GBR); L 00–10	Bye		Chochishvili (URS); L 00–10	Did not advance		=5
Douglas Nelson	+93kg	—N/a	Bye	Tempesta (ITA); W WO	Ruska (NED); L 00–10	Did not advance	—N/a	Ben Kassou (MAR); W 00–00 D	Glahn (FRG); L 00–10	Did not advance		=9
Johnny Watts	Open	—N/a	Djiba (SEN); W 02–00	Bajčetić (YUG); W 10–00	Parisi (GBR); L 00–00 D	Did not advance	Bye	Did not advance				=11

== Modern pentathlon ==
Three pentathletes represented the United States in 1972.

Athlete	Event	Riding (cross-country steeplechase)			Fencing (épée)			Shooting (25 m rapid fire pistol)			Swimming (300 m freestyle)			Running (4000 m cross-country)			Total	
Athlete	Event	Time	Rank	MP points	W–L	Rank	MP points	Score	Rank	MP points	Time	Rank	MP points	Time	Rank	MP points	MP points	Rank
John Fitzgerald	Individual	2:12.90	7	1090	33–25	=14	848	188	=21	868	3:28.50	=4	1204	13:55.60	32	1060	5070	11
Charles Richards	Individual	2:18.30	=14	1060	28–30	=31	753	192	=8	956	3:21.70	1	1260	14:00.70	35	1045	5074	9
Scott Taylor	Individual	2:37.20	35	965	24–34	=42	677	177	=55	626	3:41.90	17	1100	12:39.10	2	1288	4656	29
John Fitzgerald; Charles Richards; Scott Taylor	Team	—N/a	3	3115	—N/a	11	2278	—N/a	10	2450	—N/a	1	3564	—N/a	5	3393	14800	4

== Rowing ==
Athlete	Event	Heat		Repechage		Semifinal		Final	
Athlete	Event	Time	Rank	Time	Rank	Time	Rank	Time	Rank
Jim Dietz	Single sculls	7:57.85	4 R	7:59.13	1 SF	8:21.54	2 FA	7:24.81	5
Larry Hough; Dick Lyon	Coxless pair	7:33.16	4 R	7:37.34	2 SF	7:50.26	4 FB	7:38.64	9
Aaron Herman; Luther Jones; Mike Staines	Coxed pair	7:50.00	1 SF	Bye		8:25.40	5 FB	8:04.80	11
Thomas McKibbon; John Van Blom	Double sculls	7:08.91	4 R	7:19.63	3	Did not advance			
Dick Dreissigacker; Charles Hewitt; William Miller; James Moroney	Coxless four	6:57.05	4 R	7:13.95	4	Did not advance			
Stewart MacDonald; Chad Rudolph; Charles Ruthford; David Sawyier; Mike Vespoli	Coxed four	6:56.01	4 R	7:02.68	1 SF	7:18.59	3 FA	6:41.86	5
Gene Clapp; Bill Hobbs; Franklin Hobbs; Paul Hoffman; Cleve Livingston; Mike Livingston; Tim Mickelson; Pete Raymond; Lawrence Terry	Eight	6:06.01	1 SF	Bye		6:27.53	3 FA	6:11.61	2nd place, silver medalist(s)

Qualification legend: FA = Final A (medal); FB = Final B (non-medal); SF = Semifinal; R = Repechage

== Sailing ==
Athlete	Event	Race							Total	
Athlete	Event	1	2	3	4	5	6	7	Points	Rank
Edward Bennett	Finn	16.0	21.0	20.0	13.0	~~DNF~~	DNF	27.0	148.0	22
Scott Allan; Tim Stearn	Flying Dutchman	25.0	25.0	17.0	27.0	26.0	~~DSQ~~	20.0	140.0	23
Peter Dean; Glen Foster	Tempest	14.0	~~DSQ~~	5.7	3.0	8.0	14.0	3.0	47.7	3rd place, bronze medalist(s)
Richard Gates; Alan Holt	Star	19.0	~~DSQ~~	19.0	13.0	3.0	18.0	17.0	89.0	10
William Allen; William Bentsen; Buddy Melges	Soling	0.0	3.0	5.7	~~8.0~~	0.0	0.0	—N/a	8.7	1st place, gold medalist(s)
Don Cohan; Charles Horter; John Marshall	Dragon	8.0	~~18.0~~	10.0	11.7	0.0	18.0	—N/a	47.7	3rd place, bronze medalist(s)

== Shooting ==
Fourteen shooters represented the United States in 1972. Lones Wigger and John Writer won golds and Lanny Bassham and Vic Auer won silver medals.

Athlete	Event	Score	Rank
Bill McMillan	25 m rapid fire pistol	572	45
Jim McNally	25 m rapid fire pistol	589	10
Hershel Anderson	50 m pistol	540	34
Jimmie Doresy	50 m pistol	544	28
Charles Davis	50 m running target	540	19
Edmund Moeller	50 m running target	550	9
Victor Auer	50 m rifle prone	598	2nd place, silver medalist(s)
Lones Wigger	50 m rifle prone	597	7
Lanny Bassham	50 m rifle three positions	1157	2nd place, silver medalist(s)
John Writer	50 m rifle three positions	1166 WR	1st place, gold medalist(s)
Lanny Bassham	300 m rifle three positions	1144	7
Lones Wigger	300 m rifle three positions	1155	1st place, gold medalist(s)
Donald Haldeman	Trap	187	17
James Poindexter	Trap	192	6
Jack Johnson	Skeet	192	9
Tony Rosetti	Skeet	186	34

== Swimming ==
Key

- Note-Ranks for first round are against the entire field, ranks for semifinals and finals are within the swimmer's heat only
- Q = Qualified for the next round on rank
- q = Qualified for the next round as a fastest loser

Men

Athlete	Event	Heat		Semifinal		Final	
Athlete	Event	Time	Rank	Time	Rank	Time	Rank
Jerry Heidenreich	100 m freestyle	52.38	2 Q	52.31	1 Q	51.65	2nd place, silver medalist(s)
John Murphy	100 m freestyle	53.07	7 Q	53.17	4 q	52.08	4
Mark Spitz	100 m freestyle	52.46	3 Q	52.43	2 Q	51.22 WR	1st place, gold medalist(s)
Steve Genter	200 m freestyle	1:55.42	2 Q	—N/a		1:53.73	2nd place, silver medalist(s)
Mark Spitz	200 m freestyle	1:55.29	1 Q	—N/a		1:52.78 WR	1st place, gold medalist(s)
Fred Tyler	200 m freestyle	1:56.04	5 Q	—N/a		1:54.96	5
Rick DeMont	400 m freestyle	4:05.70	3 Q	—N/a		DSQ	
Steve Genter	400 m freestyle	4:05.89 OR	4 Q	—N/a		4:01.94	2nd place, silver medalist(s)
Tom McBreen	400 m freestyle	4:06.09	6 Q	—N/a		4:02.64	3rd place, bronze medalist(s)
Mike Burton	1500 m freestyle	16:09.56	2 Q	—N/a		15:52.58 WR	1st place, gold medalist(s)
Rick DeMont	1500 m freestyle	DSQ		—N/a		DSQ	
Doug Northway	1500 m freestyle	16:15.30	4 Q	—N/a		16:09.25	3rd place, bronze medalist(s)
Mitch Ivey	100 m backstroke	58.15	1 Q	57.99 OR	1 Q	58.48	4
John Murphy	100 m backstroke	59.93	3 Q	58.64	2 Q	58.35	3rd place, bronze medalist(s)
Mike Stamm	100 m backstroke	58.63	2 Q	58.74	2 Q	57.70	2nd place, silver medalist(s)
Mitch Ivey	200 m backstroke	2:09.32	6 Q	—N/a		2:04.33	3rd place, bronze medalist(s)
Tim McKee	200 m backstroke	2:08.19	4 Q	—N/a		2:07.29	5
Mike Stamm	200 m backstroke	2:07.51 OR	2 Q	—N/a		2:04.09	2nd place, silver medalist(s)
Tom Bruce	100 m breaststroke	1:06.45	6 Q	1:06.05	3 Q	1:05.43	2nd place, silver medalist(s)
Mark Chatfield	100 m breaststroke	1:05.89	1 Q	1:06.08	4 Q	1:06.01	4
John Hencken	100 m breaststroke	1:05.96	2 Q	1:05.68 WR	1 Q	1:05.61	3rd place, bronze medalist(s)
Rick Colella	200 m breaststroke	2:25.40	4 Q	—N/a		2:24.28	4
John Hencken	200 m breaststroke	2:24.88	3 Q	—N/a		2:21.55 WR	1st place, gold medalist(s)
Brian Job	200 m breaststroke	2:26.91	11	—N/a		Did not advance	
Dave Edgar	100 m butterfly	57.30	5 Q	56.88	3 Q	56.11	5
Jerry Heidenreich	100 m butterfly	56.86	3 Q	56.18	2 Q	55.74	3rd place, bronze medalist(s)
Mark Spitz	100 m butterfly	56.45	=1 Q	55.98	1 Q	54.27 WR	1st place, gold medalist(s)
Robin Backhaus	200 m butterfly	2:03.11 OR	2 Q	—N/a		2:03.23	3rd place, bronze medalist(s)
Gary Hall Sr.	200 m butterfly	2:03.70 OR	3 Q	—N/a		2:02.86	2nd place, silver medalist(s)
Mark Spitz	200 m butterfly	2:02.11 OR	1 Q	—N/a		2:00.70 WR	1st place, gold medalist(s)
Steve Furniss	200 m individual medley	2:09.97	3 Q	—N/a		2:08.45	3rd place, bronze medalist(s)
Gary Hall Sr.	200 m individual medley	2:09.85	2 Q	—N/a		2:08.49	4
Tim McKee	200 m individual medley	2:10.44	4 Q	—N/a		2:08.37	2nd place, silver medalist(s)
Steve Furniss	400 individual medley	4:39.33	5 Q	—N/a		4:35.44	4
Gary Hall Sr.	400 individual medley	4:38.95	4 Q	—N/a		4:37.38	5
Tim McKee	400 individual medley	4:40.78	6 Q	—N/a		4:31.983	2nd place, silver medalist(s)
Gary Conelly^{[b]} Dave Edgar; David Fairbank^{[b]} Jerry Heidenreich; John Murphy; Mark Spitz	4 × 100 m freestyle relay	3:28.84 WR	1 Q	—N/a		3:26.42 WR	1st place, gold medalist(s)
Mike Burton^{[b]} Gary Conelly^{[b]} Steve Genter; John Kinsella; Tom McBreen^{[b]} Mark Spitz; Fred Tyler	4 × 200 m freestyle relay	7:46.42 OR	1 Q	—N/a		7:35.78 WR	1st place, gold medalist(s)
Tom Bruce; David Fairbank^{[b]} Gary Hall Sr.^{[b]} Jerry Heidenreich; John Hencken^{[b]} Mitch Ivey^{[b]} Mark Spitz; Mike Stamm	4 × 100 medley relay	3:51.98	1 Q	—N/a		3:48.16 WR	1st place, gold medalist(s)

Women

Athlete	Event	Heat		Semifinal		Final	
Athlete	Event	Time	Rank	Time	Rank	Time	Rank
Shirley Babashoff	100 m freestyle	59.51	=3 Q	59.05 OR	1 Q	59.02	2nd place, silver medalist(s)
Jenny Kemp	100 m freestyle	1:00.42	10 Q	59.93	5	Did not advance	
Sandy Neilson	100 m freestyle	59.51	=3 Q	59.41	2 Q	58.59 OR	1st place, gold medalist(s)
Shirley Babashoff	200 m freestyle	2:08.48	5 Q	—N/a		2:04.33	2nd place, silver medalist(s)
Ann Marshall	200 m freestyle	2:08.12 OR	4 Q	—N/a		2:05.45	4
Keena Rothhammer	200 m freestyle	2:07.48 OR	1 Q	—N/a		2:04.92	3rd place, bronze medalist(s)
Shirley Babashoff	400 m freestyle	4:31.98	8 Q	—N/a		4:23.59	4
Keena Rothhammer	400 m freestyle	4:24.82	2 Q	—N/a		4:24.22	6
Jenny Wylie	400 m freestyle	4:27.53 OR	4 Q	—N/a		4:24.07	5
Jo Harshbarger	800 m freestyle	9:14.46	6 Q	—N/a		9:01.21	6
Keena Rothhammer	800 m freestyle	8:59.69	1 Q	—N/a		8:53.68 WR	1st place, gold medalist(s)
Ann Simmons	800 m freestyle	9:11.94	5 Q	—N/a		8:57.62	4
Susie Atwood	100 m backstroke	1:08.30	12 Q	1:06.26	2 Q	1:06.34	3rd place, bronze medalist(s)
Melissa Belote	100 m backstroke	1:06.60	2 Q	1:06.08 OR	1 Q	1:05.78 OR	1st place, gold medalist(s)
Karen Moe	100 m backstroke	1:07.69	6 Q	1:06.27	3 Q	1:06.69	4
Susie Atwood	200 m backstroke	2:22.13	2 Q	—N/a		2:20.38	2nd place, silver medalist(s)
Melissa Belote	200 m backstroke	2:20.58	1 Q	—N/a		2:19.19 WR	1st place, gold medalist(s)
Lynn Skrifvars	200 m backstroke	2:26.40	13	—N/a		Did not advance	
Cathy Carr	100 m breaststroke	1:16.01	1 Q	1:15.00 OR	1 Q	1:13.58 WR	1st place, gold medalist(s)
Judy Melick	100 m breaststroke	1:16.75	3 Q	1:16.22	2 Q	1:16.34	5
Lynn Vidali	100 m breaststroke	1:18.80	=22	Did not advance			
Claudia Clevenger	200 m breaststroke	2:44.74	7 Q	—N/a		2:42.88	4
Barbara Mitchell	200 m breaststroke	2:47.05	13	—N/a		Did not advance	
Dana Schoenfield	200 m breaststroke	2:43.97	4 Q	—N/a		2:42.05	2nd place, silver medalist(s)
Ellie Daniel	100 m butterfly	1:04.33	3 Q	1:04.25	3 Q	1:04.08	6
Deena Deardurff	100 m butterfly	1:04.80	5 Q	1:03.97	1 Q	1:03.95	4
Dana Shrader	100 m butterfly	1:05.09	8 Q	1:04.54	3 Q	1:03.98	5
Lynn Colella	200 m butterfly	2:18.80	4 Q	—N/a		2:16.34	2nd place, silver medalist(s)
Ellie Daniel	200 m butterfly	2:17.18 OR	1 Q	—N/a		2:16.74	3rd place, bronze medalist(s)
Karen Moe	200 m butterfly	2:18.15	2 Q	—N/a		2:15.57 WR	1st place, gold medalist(s)
Jenny Bartz	200 m individual medley	2:25.83	4 Q	—N/a		2:24.55	4
Lynn Vidali	200 m individual medley	2:24.92	1 Q	—N/a		2:24.06	3rd place, bronze medalist(s)
Carolyn Woods	200 m individual medley	2:26.98	8 Q	—N/a		2:27.42	8
Jenny Bartz	400 m individual medley	5:07.31	2 Q	—N/a		5:05.56	4
Mary Montgomery	400 m individual medley	5:13.62	8 Q	—N/a		5:09.98	6
Lynn Vidali	400 m individual medley	5:09.67	4 Q	—N/a		5:13.06	7
Shirley Babashoff; Jane Barkman; Jenny Kemp; Ann Marshall^{[b]} Sandy Neilson; Kim Peyton^{[b]} Lynn Skrifvars^{[b]}	4 × 100 m freestyle relay	3:58.93	2 Q	—N/a		3:55.19 WR	1st place, gold medalist(s)
Susie Atwood^{[b]} Shirley Babashoff^{[b]} Melissa Belote; Cathy Carr; Deena Deardurff; Judy Melick^{[b]} Sandy Neilson; Dana Shrader^{[b]}	4 × 100 m medley relay	4:27.57	1 Q	—N/a		4:20.75 WR	1st place, gold medalist(s)

^{b} - Swimmer competed in the heat but not the final

== Water polo ==
Summary

Team	Event	Preliminary round						Final round				
Team	Event	Opposition Result	Opposition Result	Opposition Result	Opposition Result	Opposition Result	Rank	Opposition Result	Opposition Result	Opposition Result	Opposition Result	Rank
United States men	Men's tournament	Romania; W 4–3	Cuba; W 7–6	Canada; W 8–1	Mexico; W 7–5	Yugoslavia; W 5–3	1 Q	West Germany; T 4–4	Hungary; L 3–5	Soviet Union; T 6–6	Italy; W 6–5	3rd place, bronze medalist(s)

Team Roster

- Peter Asch
- Steven Barnett
- Bruce Bradley
- Stanley Cole
- James Ferguson
- Eric Lindroth
- John Parker
- Gary Sheerer
- James Slatton
- Russell Webb
- Barry Weitzenberg

== Weightlifting ==
Athlete	Event	Military press		Snatch		Clean & jerk		Total	
Athlete	Event	Weight	Rank	Weight	Rank	Weight	Rank	Weight	Rank
Dan Cantore	–67.5 kg	140.0	9	117.5	12	162.5	7	420.0	9
Russell Knipp	–75 kg	160.0	4	127.5	11	170.0	9	457.5	8
Fred Lowe	–75 kg	147.5	11	135.0	9	175.0	4	457.5	9
Mike Karchut	–82.5 kg	160.0	8	145.0	4	NVL		DNF	
Phil Grippaldi	–90 kg	170.0	6	140.0	9	195.0	2	505.0	4
Rick Holbrook	–90 kg	162.5	9	145.0	7	197.5 OR	1	505.0	5
Alan Ball	–110 kg	167.5	18	162.5	6	185.0	14	515.0	11
Frank Capsouras	–110 kg	170.0	15	150.0	11	200.0	6	520.0	11
Ken Patera	+110 kg	212.5	3	NVL		DNF			

== Wrestling ==
Key:

- TO – Victory by fall.
- SP - Win by technical superiority
- PP - Win by technical points
- D2 - Both wrestlers disqualified for passivity

Athlete	Event	Elimination stage								Final stage			
Athlete	Event	Opposition Result (Penalty points)	Opposition Result (Penalty points)	Opposition Result (Penalty points)	Opposition Result (Penalty points)	Opposition Result (Penalty points)	Opposition Result (Penalty points)	Opposition Result (Penalty points)	TPP	Opposition Result (Penalty points)	Opposition Result (Penalty points)	FPP	Rank
Sergio Gonzalez	Freestyle 48 kg	Javadi (IRN); T (2.0)	Lacour (FRG); T (2.0)	Möbius (GDR); T (2.0)	EL	—N/a			6.0	Did not advance			
James Carr	Freestyle 52 kg	Kim (KOR); L TO (4.0)	León (PER); W TO (0.0)	Bertie (CAN); L TO (4.0)	EL			—N/a	8.0	Did not advance			
Richard Sanders	Freestyle 57 kg	Hatziioannidis (GRE); W TO (0.0)	Dumitru (ROM); W TO (0.0)	Maggiolo (ARG); W TO (0.0)	Yanagida (JPN); L PP (3.0)	Nath (IND); W TO (0.0)	Shavov (BUL); W PP (1.0)	Klinga (HUN); W TO (0.0)	4.0	—N/a		3.0	2nd place, silver medalist(s)
Gene Davis	Freestyle 62 kg	Oidov (MGL); W TO (0.0)	Abe (JPN); L SP (3.5)	Abdulbekov (URS); L TO (4.0)	EL			—N/a	7.5	Did not advance			
Dan Gable	Freestyle 68 kg	Sali (YUG); W TO (0.0)	Rost (FRG); W SP (0.5)	Ioannidis (GRE); W TO (0.0)	Wada (JPN); W PP (1.0)	Cieślak (POL); W TO (0.0)	—N/a		1.5	—N/a	Ashuraliyev (URS); W PP (1.0)	2.0	1st place, gold medalist(s)
Wayne Wells	Freestyle 74 kg	Demirtaş (TUR); W TO (0.0)	Sereeter (MGL); W TO (0.0)	Musil (TCH); W TO (0.0)	Nitschke (GDR); W PP (1.0)	Robin (FRA); W PP (1.0)	Pavlov (BUL); W TO (0.0)	—N/a	2.0	Karlsson (SWE); W PP (1.0)	Seger (FRG); W PP (1.0)	2.0	1st place, gold medalist(s)
John Peterson	Freestyle 82 kg	Barraclough (GBR); W TO (0.0)	Neumari (FRG); W PP (1.0)	Wypiorczyk (POL); W TO (0.0)	Tediashvili (URS); L PP (3.0)	Iorga (ROM); W PP (1.0)	Stottmeister (GDR); W PP (1.0)	—N/a	6.0	—N/a			2nd place, silver medalist(s)
Ben Peterson	Freestyle 90 kg	Kurczewski (POL); W PP (1.0)	García (MEX); W TO (0.0)	Strakhov (URS); T (2.0)	Khorrami (IRN); W PP (1.0)	Morgan (CUB); W TO (0.0)	Petrov (BUL); W TO (0.0)	—N/a	4.0	—N/a		2.0	1st place, gold medalist(s)
Henk Schenk	Freestyle 100 kg	Csatári (HUN); L PP (3.0)	Hecher (FRG); L PP (3.0)	EL			—N/a		6.0	Did not advance			
Chris Taylor	Freestyle +100 kg	Medved (URS); L PP (3.0)	Eskander-Filabi (IRN); W PP (1.0)	Isogai (JPN); W TO (0.0)	Dietrich (FRG); W PP (1.0)	Duraliev (BUL); W PP (1.0)	—N/a		6.0	—N/a	Did not advance		3rd place, bronze medalist(s)
Wayne Holmes	Greco-Roman 48 kg	Drechsel (GDR); L TO (4.0)	Sarı (TUR); L PP (3.0)	EL			—N/a		7.0	Did not advance			
David Hazewinkel	Greco-Roman 57 kg	An (KOR); L PP (3.0)	Björlin (FIN); L PP (3.0)	EL					6.0	—N/a	Did not advance		
Jim Hazewinkel	Greco-Roman 62 kg	Koletić (YUG); L TO (4.0)	Păun (ROM); L PP (3.0)	EL				—N/a	7.0	—N/a			Did not advance
Robert Buzzard	Greco-Roman 68 kg	Ranzi (ITA); L TO (4.0)	Hışırlı (TUR); L TO (4.0)	EL				—N/a	8.0	—N/a		Did not advance	
Gary Neist	Greco-Roman 74 kg	Kecman (YUG); L PP (3.0)	Karlsson (SWE); L PP (3.0)	EL			—N/a		6.0	—N/a	Did not advance		
Jay Robinson	Greco-Roman 82 kg	Ostrowski (POL); L PP (3.0)	Blanco (ARG); W TO (0.0)	Yağmur (TUR); L TO (4.0)	EL		—N/a		7.0	Did not advance			
Wayne Baughman	Greco-Roman 90 kg	Andersson (SWE); W PP (1.0)	Kowalewski (FRG); L TO (4.0)	Pércsi (HUN); L SP (3.5)	EL		—N/a		8.5	Did not advance			
Burke Deadrich	Greco-Roman 100 kg	Yakovenko (URS); L TO (4.0)	Skrzydlewski (POL); L TO (4.0)	EL			—N/a		8.0	—N/a	Did not advance		
Chris Taylor	Greco-Roman +100 kg	Dietrich (FRG); L TO (4.0)	Kment (TCH); L D2 (4.0)	EL		—N/a			8.0	—N/a	Did not advance		

== Water skiing (demonstration sport) ==
Men's slalom:

- Wayne Grimditch - 38.5 points, silver medal
- Ricky McCormick - 27.5 points, 9th place

Men's Figure skiing:

- Ricky McCormick - 5340 points, gold medal
- Wayne Grimditch - 4510 points, silver medal

Men's Jump:

- Ricky McCormick - 43.75 points, gold medal
- Wayne Grimditch - 30.15 points, 14th place

Women's slalom:

- Liz Allen-Shetter - 35.0 points, gold medal

Women's Figure skiing:

- Liz Allen-Shetter - 1550 points, 5th place

Women's Jump:

- Liz Allen-Shetter - 25.70 points, bronze medal

== See also ==
- United States at the 1971 Pan American Games
- United States at the 1972 Summer Paralympics
