= Swimming at the 1973 World Aquatics Championships – Women's 200 metre backstroke =

Women's 200 metre backstroke at the 1973 World Aquatics Championships
- Dates: September 7, 1973
- Competitors: 24 from 17 nations
- Winning time: 2:20.522

Medalists
gold medal	Melissa Belote	United States
silver medal	Enith Brigitha	Netherlands
bronze medal	Andrea Gyarmati	Hungary

The women's 200 metre backstroke competition of the swimming events at the 1973 World Aquatics Championships took place on September 7.

== Records ==
Prior to the competition, the existing world and championship records were as follows.

World record	Melissa Belote (USA)	2:19.19	Munich, West Germany	4 September 1972
Competition record	N/A	N/A	N/A	N/A

The following records were established during the competition:

Date	Event	Name	Nationality	Time	Record
7 September	Heat	Wendy Cook	Canada	2:23.123	CR
7 September	Heat	Melissa Belote	United States	2:20.576	CR
7 September	Final	Melissa Belote	United States	2:20.522	CR

== Results ==
=== Heats ===
24 swimmers participated in 4 heats.

Rank	Heat	Lane	Name	Nationality	Time	Notes
1	4	-	Melissa Belote	United States	2:20.576	Q, CR
2	1	-	Wendy Cook	Canada	2:23.123	Q, CR
3	2	-	Andrea Gyarmati	Hungary	2:23.586	Q
4	3	-	Enith Brigitha	Netherlands	2:24.882	Q
5	4	-	Christine Herbst	East Germany	2:24.932	Q
6	1	-	Debra Cain	Australia	2:24.967	Q
7	3	-	Andrea Eife	East Germany	2:25.434	Q
8	1	-	Sylvie Le Noach	France	2:25.513	Q
9	2	-	Linda Young	Australia	2:25.941	
10	4	-	Josien Elzerman	Netherlands	2:26.369	
11	1	-	Diana Olsson	Sweden	2:26.965	
12	3	-	Angelika Grieser	West Germany	2:27.508	
13	3	-	Maryanne Graham	United States	2:29.282	
14	4	-	Donna-Marie Gurr	Canada	2:30.864	
15	2	-	Susan Hunter	New Zealand	2:31.004	
16	2	-	I. Golovanova	Soviet Union	2:31.975	
17	2	-	F. Chaunin	Belgium	2:33.964	
18	1	-	H. Jaqueti	Spain	2:34.964	
19	3	-	E. Kobielska	Poland	2:35.394	
20	4	-	T. Skvortsova	Soviet Union	2:38.871	
21	4	-	D. McSwain	Puerto Rico	2:39.033	
22	2	-	B. Fernandes	Brazil	2:41.703	
23	1	-	María Mock	Puerto Rico	2:45.299	
24	3	-	R. Okan	Turkey	2:51.648	

=== Final ===
The results of the final are below.

Rank	Lane	Name	Nationality	Time	Notes
1st place, gold medalist(s)	4	Melissa Belote	United States	2:20.522	CR
2nd place, silver medalist(s)	6	Enith Brigitha	Netherlands	2:22.152	
3rd place, bronze medalist(s)	3	Andrea Gyarmati	Hungary	2:22.483	
4	2	Christine Herbst	East Germany	2:22.660	
5	1	Andrea Eife	East Germany	2:23.551	
6	5	Wendy Cook	Canada	2:23.596	
7	7	Debra Cain	Australia	2:24.268	
8	8	Sylvie Le Noach	France	2:26.053	
