= Ireland at the 1972 Summer Olympics =

- IOC code: IRL
- NOC: Olympic Federation of Ireland
- Website: olympics.ie

in Munich
- Competitors: 59 in 12 sports
- Flag bearer: Ronnie McMahon
- Medals: Gold 0 Silver 0 Bronze 0 Total 0

Summer Olympics appearances (overview)
- 1924; 1928; 1932; 1936; 1948; 1952; 1956; 1960; 1964; 1968; 1972; 1976; 1980; 1984; 1988; 1992; 1996; 2000; 2004; 2008; 2012; 2016; 2020; 2024

Other related appearances
- Great Britain (1896–1920)

Ireland competed at the 1972 Summer Olympics in Munich, West Germany. 59 competitors, 51 men and 8 women, took part in 54 events in 12 sports. No Irish athletes received an Olympic medal in their sport.

== Athletics ==
Men's 400 metres

- Fanaghan McSweeney

- Heat — 47.1 (→ did not advance)

Men's 800 metres

- Frank Murphy

- Heat — 1:51.1
- Semifinals — 1:49.2 (→ did not advance)

Men's 1.500 metres

- Frank Murphy

- Heat — 3:43.3 (→ did not advance)

Men's 5.000 metres

- Michael Keogh

- Heat — 13:57.8 (→ did not advance)

- John Hartnett

- Heat — 14:34.6 (→ did not advance)

Men's 10.000 metres

- Neil Cusack

- Heat — 28:45.8 (→ did not advance)

Men's 3.000 metres Steeplechase

- Edward Leddy

- Heat — 8:47.4 (→ did not advance)

Men's Marathon

- Danny McDaid

- Final — 2:22:25 (→ 23rd place)

- Des McGann

- Final — 2:28:31 (→ 42nd place)

- Donie Walsh

- Final — 2:31:12 (→ 47th place)

Men's Shot Put

- Phil Conway

- Qualifying Round — 16.69 m (→ did not advance)

Women's 800 metres

- Claire Walsh

- Heat — 2:08.98 (→ did not advance)

- Mary Tracey

- Heat — 2:04.18 (→ did not advance)

Women's 1.500 metres

- Mary Tracey

- Heat — 4:16.43 (→ national record, did not advance)

Women's 100m Hurdles

- Margaret Murphy

- Heat — 15.89 m (→ did not advance)

Women's Pentathlon

- Margaret Murphy

- Final ranking — 3770 pts (→ 27th place)

== Boxing ==
Men's Welterweight 67 kg Joe Darcy unable to compete due to injury.

Men's Light Middleweight (– 71 kg)

- Christopher Elliott

- First Round — Bye
- Second Round — Defeated Farouk Kesrouan (LEB), 5:0

- Third Round — Lost to Emeterio Villanueva (MEX), TKO-3

== Cycling ==
Four cyclists represented Ireland in 1972.

Individual road race

- Liam Horner — 38th place
- Kieron McQuaid — 40th place
- Peter Doyle — 69th place
- Noel Taggart — did not finish (→ no ranking)

Team time trial

- Liam Horner
- Peter Doyle
- Kieron McQuaid
- Noel Taggart

== Fencing ==
One fencer represented Ireland in 1972.

Men's foil

- John Bouchier-Hayes

Men's épée

- John Bouchier-Hayes

== Rowing ==
Men's Single Sculls

- Seán Drea

- Heat — 7:47.64
- Repechage — 7:50.27
- Semi Finals — 8:27.70
- B-Final — 7:55.33 (→ 7th place)

== Sailing ==
Ireland contested the Finn, Flying Dutchman, Tempest and Dragon class sailing events. The highest finishers were David Wilkins and Sean Whitaker, who ranked 8th in the Tempest event. The Dragon event, in which Ireland ranked 16th, was contested by a crew that included Robin Hennessy, Treen Morris, Harry Byrne and Joe McMenamin. MacMenamin, who was "six weeks shy of his 60th birthday" at the time, was Ireland's oldest Olympic athlete.

== Shooting ==
Four male shooters represented Ireland in 1972.

Trap

- Dermot Kelly
- Gerry Brady

Skeet

- William Campbell
- Arthur McMahon

== Swimming ==
Athlete	Event	Heat		Semifinal		Final	
Athlete	Event	Time	Rank	Time	Rank	Time	Rank
Andrew Hunter	Men's 100 m freestyle	56.09	37	Did not advance			
Brian Clifford	Men's 1500 m freestyle	18:09.28		—N/a		Did not advance	
Liam Ball	Men's 100 m breaststroke	1:09.68		Did not advance			
Liam Ball	Men's 200 m breaststroke	2:33.47		—N/a		Did not advance	
Aisling O'Leary	Women's 800 m freestyle	10:18.05		—N/a		Did not advance	
Christine Fulcher	Women's 100 m backstroke	1:10.63		Did not advance			
Christine Fulcher	Women's 200 m backstroke	2:33.73		—N/a		Did not advance	
Ann O'Connor	Women's 100 m breaststroke	1:19.13		Did not advance			
Ann O'Connor	Women's 200 m breaststroke	2:53.04	29	—N/a		Did not advance	
Brenda McGrory	Women's 100 m butterfly	1:08.52		Did not advance			
Ann O'Connor; Christine Fulcher; Brenda McGrory; Aisling O'Leary	Women's 4 × 100 metre freestyle relay	4:26.34		—N/a		Did not advance	
Christine Fulcher; Ann O'Connor; Brenda McGrory; Aisling O'Leary	Women's 4 × 100 metre medley relay	4:45.56		—N/a		Did not advance	
