= María Vargas =

María Vargas may refer to:

- María Cecilia Vargas (born 1957), Mexican Olympic swimmer
- María Paula Vargas (born 1995), Spanish artistic gymnast
- María José Vargas (born 1993), Bolivian-born Argentine racquetball player
- María Villaseñor Vargas (born 1960), Mexican politician
- María Margarita Vargas Santaella (born 1983), Duchess of Anjou
- The heroine, played by Ava Gardner, of the 1954 film The Barefoot Contessa
