= Catherine Carr =

Catherine Carr may refer to:

- Catherine Carr (screenwriter) (1880–1941), silent-film era screenwriter
- Cathy Carr (swimmer) (born 1954), American swimmer
- Cathy Carr (singer) (1936–1988), singer

== See also ==
- Rosalind Wade (1909–1989), British novelist and short story writer, who also wrote under the name Catharine Carr
- Katy Carr (disambiguation)
