= Vreni Eberle =

German swimmer

Personal information
- Born: November 13, 1950 (age 75) Munich, West Germany

Sport
- Sport: Swimming
Medal record
Representing West Germany
Olympic Games
Bronze medal – third place	1972 Munich	4x100 m medley relay

Vreni Eberle (born 13 November 1950) is a German former swimmer who competed in the 1968 Summer Olympics and in the 1972 Summer Olympics.
