= Cathy Raftery =

Canadian swimmer

Personal information
- Born: 1 December 1957 (age 68) Montreal, Quebec, Canada

Sport
- Sport: Swimming

Cathy Raftery (born 1 December 1957) is a Canadian former backstroke swimmer. She competed in the women's 100 metre backstroke at the 1972 Summer Olympics.
