= Josiane Castiau =

French swimmer

Personal information
- Nationality: French
- Born: 19 October 1954 (age 71)

Sport
- Sport: Swimming

Josiane Castiau (born 19 October 1954) is a French former swimmer. She competed in the women's 4 × 100 metre medley relay at the 1972 Summer Olympics held in Munich, West Germany.
