= Susie Atwood =

American swimmer (born 1953)

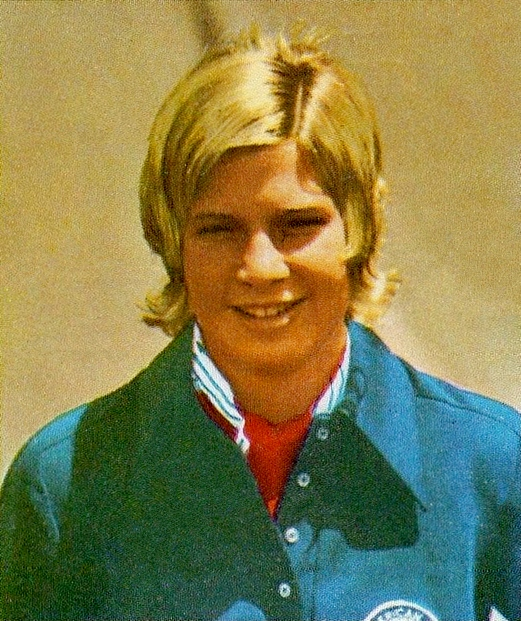
- Atwood c. 1972

Personal information
- Full name: Susanne Jean Atwood
- Nickname: "Susie"
- National team: United States
- Born: June 5, 1953 (age 73) Long Beach, California, U.S.
- Height: 5 ft 7 in (1.70 m)
- Weight: 146 lb (66 kg)

Sport
- Sport: Swimming
- Strokes: Backstroke, individual medley
- Club: Lakewood Aquatic Club
- Coach: Jim Montrella
Medal record
Women's swimming
Representing the United States
Olympic Games
Silver medal – second place	1972 Munich	200 m backstroke
Bronze medal – third place	1972 Munich	100 m backstroke
Pan American Games
Silver medal – second place	1971 Cali	100 m backstroke
Silver medal – second place	1971 Cali	200 m backstroke
Silver medal – second place	1971 Cali	200 m medley
Silver medal – second place	1971 Cali	4x100 m medley
Bronze medal – third place	1971 Cali	400 m medley
Universiade
Gold medal – first place	1973 Moscow	200 m medley

Susanne Jean Atwood (born June 5, 1953) is an American former competition swimmer, two-time Olympic medalist, and former world record-holder in two events.

Atwood represented the United States as a 15-year-old at the 1968 Summer Olympics in Mexico City. She competed in the preliminary heats of the women's 200-meter backstroke, recording a time of 2:35.2, but did not advance.

She garnered significant success three years later at the 1971 Pan American Games in Cali, Colombia, where she received three medals. She received silver medals in the 100-meter and 200-meter backstroke events, and a bronze in the 400-meter individual medley.

Before the 1972 US Olympic Trials, she held the world record in the 200-meter backstroke (2:21.5), though her record would be broken by Melissa Belote at the trials & again by Belote in Munich.

Atwood won two medals at the 1972 Summer Olympics in Munich, Germany. She received the silver medal for her second-place performance (2:20.38) in the women's 200-meter backstroke, finishing behind fellow American Melissa Belote, who set a new world-record time in the event (2:19.19). Atwood received a bronze medal for her third-place finish in the women's 100-meter backstroke, coming behind Belote and Hungarian Andrea Gyarmati. She also swam the backstroke leg for the winning U.S. team in the preliminary heats of the women's 4×100-meter medley relay. She did not receive a medal in the medley relay because she did not swim in the event final, and was therefore ineligible to receive a medal under the Olympic swimming rules in effect in 1972.

She became the head coach of the Ohio State Buckeyes women's swimming and diving team in 1977. Atwood was inducted into the International Swimming Hall of Fame as an "Honor Swimmer" in 1992.

== See also ==
- List of Olympic medalists in swimming (women)
- World record progression 200 metres backstroke
- World record progression 4 × 100 metres medley relay

Records
Preceded by Karen Muir	Women's 200-meter backstroke world record-holder (long course); August 14, 1968 – August 5, 1972	Succeeded by Melissa Belote
