= Martine Claret =

French swimmer

Personal information
- Born: 11 January 1955 (age 71)

Sport
- Sport: Swimming

Martine Claret (born 11 January 1955) is a French former swimmer. She competed in the women's 4 × 100 metre medley relay at the 1972 Summer Olympics.
