= Katy Carr (disambiguation) =

Katy Carr is a musician.

Katy or Katie Carr may also refer to:

- Katy Carr, protagonist in What Katy Did
- Katie Carr, model
- Katie Roe Carr, British television personality

== See also ==
- Catherine Carr (disambiguation)
