= Liam Horner =

Irish cyclist (1943–2003)

Personal information
- Born: 26 June 1943 Dublin, Ireland
- Died: 13 April 2003 (aged 59)

Cycling career
- Sport: Cycling

Liam Horner (26 June 1943 – 13 April 2003) was an Irish Olympic cyclist. He won the Tour of Ireland in 1972 and competed at the Summer Olympics in 1968 and 1972.
