= Kieron McQuaid =

Irish cyclist

Personal information
- Born: 17 November 1950 (age 75)

Cycling career
- Sport: Cycling

Kieron McQuaid (born 17 November 1950) is a former Irish cyclist. He competed in the individual road race and team time trial events at the 1972 Summer Olympics.
