= Silke Pielen =

German swimmer (born 1955)

Personal information
- Born: August 29, 1955 (age 70) Nordhorn, West Germany

Sport
- Sport: Swimming
- Strokes: Backstroke
Medal record
Representing West Germany
Olympic Games
| Bronze medal – third place | 1972 Munich | 4x100 m medley relay |

Silke Pielen (born 29 August 1955) is a German former swimmer who competed in the 1972 Summer Olympics.
