= Marianne Vermaat =

Dutch swimmer

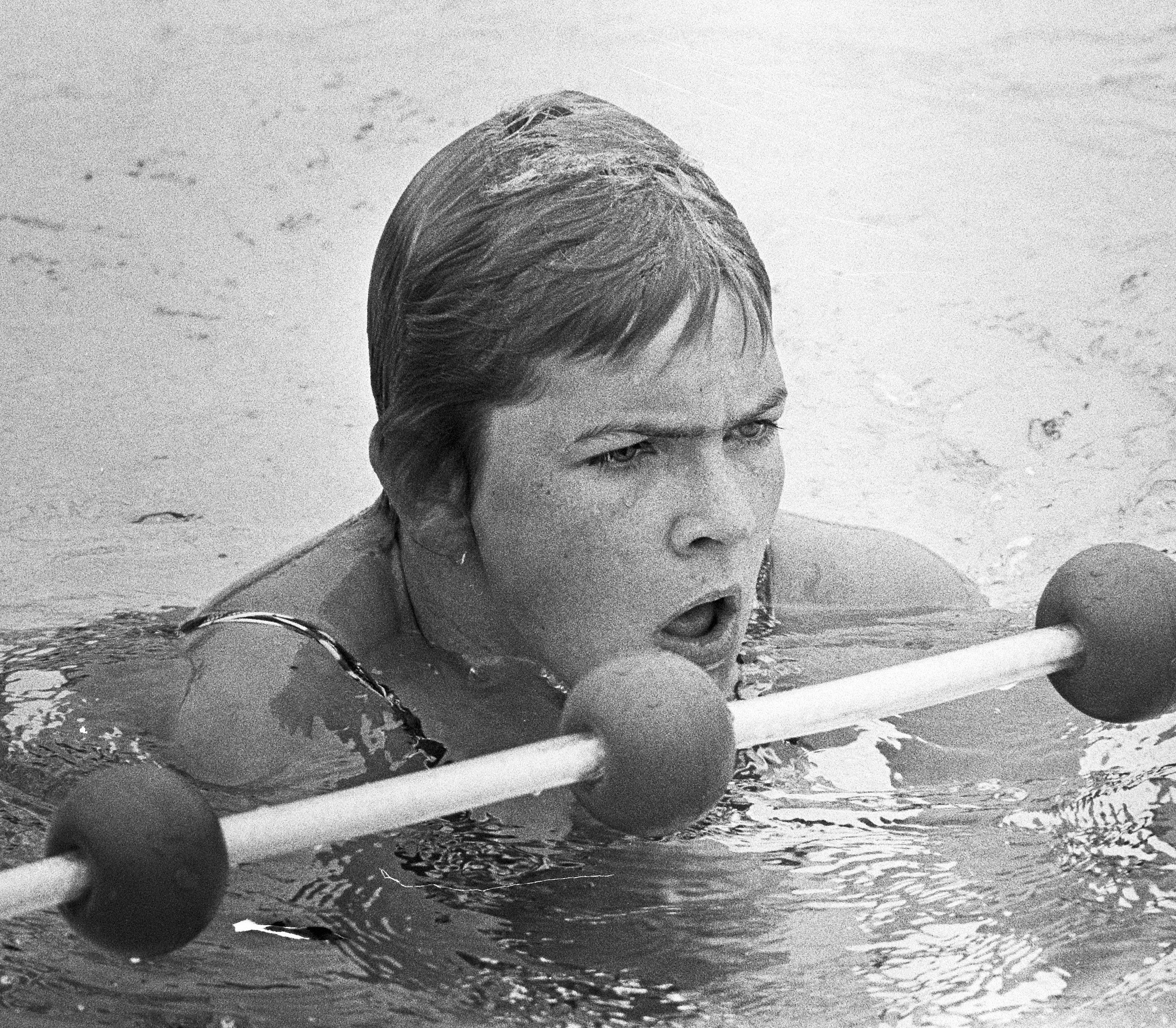
- Marianne Vermaat in 1971

Personal information
- Born: 2 May 1955 (age 71) Vlaardingen, the Netherlands
- Height: 1.67 m (5 ft 6 in)
- Weight: 63 kg (139 lb)

Sport
- Sport: Swimming
- Club: VZC, Vlaardingen

Marianne Vermaat (born 2 May 1955) is a former backstroke swimmer from the Netherlands, who competed for her native country at the 1972 Summer Olympics in Munich, West Germany. There she was eliminated in the semi-finals of the 100 m backstroke, clocking 1:09.11 (16th place).
