= Melissa Belote =

American swimmer (born 1956)

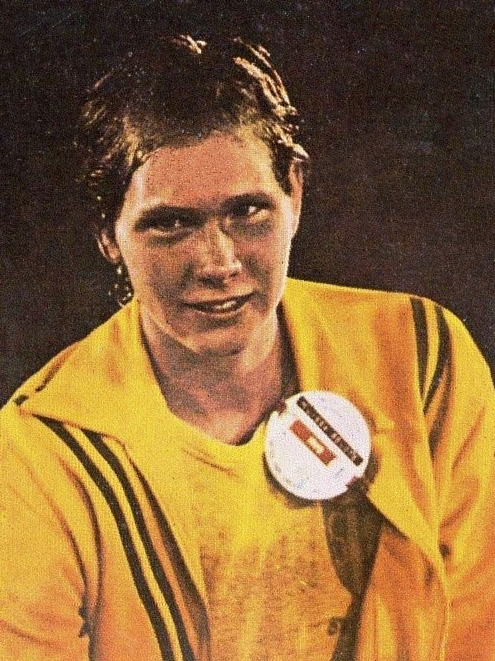
- Belote c. 1972

Personal information
- Full name: Melissa Louise Belote
- National team: United States
- Born: October 16, 1956 (age 69) Washington, D.C., U.S.
- Height: 5 ft 7 in (170 cm)
- Weight: 132 lb (60 kg)

Sport
- Sport: Swimming
- Strokes: Backstroke
- Club: Solotar Swim Club; Springfield Swim and Racquet Club
- College team: Arizona State University
- Coach: Ramona Plummer ASU
Medal record
Women's swimming
Representing the United States
Olympic Games
Gold medal – first place	1972 Munich	100 m backstroke
Gold medal – first place	1972 Munich	200 m backstroke
Gold medal – first place	1972 Munich	4x100 m medley relay
World Championships
Gold medal – first place	1973 Belgrade	200 m backstroke
Silver medal – second place	1973 Belgrade	100 m backstroke
Silver medal – second place	1973 Belgrade	4x100 m medley relay

Melissa Louise Belote (born October 16, 1956), also known by her current married name Melissa Belote Ripley, is an American former competition swimmer, three-time Olympic champion, and former world record-holder in two events. She represented the United States at the 1972 and 1976 Olympics.

== Career ==
Belote was born in Washington, D.C. She grew up in Springfield, Virginia, was a member of the Springfield Swim and Racquet Club, and attended Robert E. Lee High School in Fairfax County, Virginia.

At 15 years old, she won three gold medals at the 1972 Summer Olympics in Munich, Germany. In the women's 100-meter backstroke, Belote defeated her American teammate and world-record holder Susie Atwood. In the women's 200-meter backstroke, Belote set a new world record of 2:19.19. She won a third gold medal by swimming the lead-off backstroke leg for the winning U.S. team in the women's 4×100-meter medley relay. She and her teammates Cathy Carr (breaststroke), Deena Deardurff (butterfly), and Sandy Neilson (freestyle) set a new world record of 4:20.75 in the relay final.

She attended Arizona State University, where she swam for the Arizona State Sun Devils swimming and diving team in Association for Intercollegiate Athletics for Women (AIAW) competition under Head women's coach Mona Plummer. Belote received the Honda Sports Award for Swimming and Diving, recognizing her as the outstanding college female swimmer of the year in 1976–77.

She retired from the sport in 1979, and was inducted in the International Swimming Hall of Fame in 1983. She was also inducted into the Virginia Sports Hall of Fame in 1989.

She has coached swimming and diving at McClintock High School in Tempe, Arizona, and for the Rio Salado Swim Team.

== See also ==
- List of members of the International Swimming Hall of Fame
- List of Arizona State University alumni
- List of multiple Olympic gold medalists
- List of Olympic medalists in swimming (women)
- List of World Aquatics Championships medalists in swimming (women)
- World record progression 200 metres backstroke
- World record progression 4 × 100 metres medley relay

Records
Preceded by Susie Atwood	Women's 200-meter backstroke world record-holder (long course); August 5, 1972 – July 7, 1974	Succeeded by Ulrike Richter
