= Deena Deardurff =

American swimmer (born 1957)

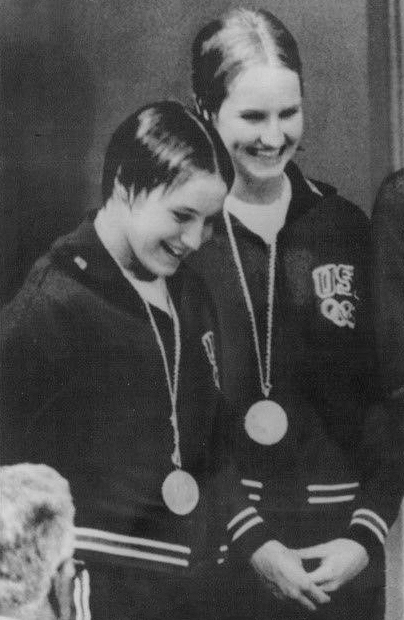
- Deardurff (left) at the 1972 Olympics

Personal information
- Full name: Deena Diane Deardurff
- National team: United States
- Born: May 8, 1957 (age 69) Wyoming, Ohio, U.S.
- Height: 5 ft 5 in (1.65 m)
- Weight: 128 lb (58 kg)

Sport
- Sport: Swimming
- Strokes: Butterfly
- Club: Cincinnati Marlins
Medal record
Representing the United States
Olympic Games
Gold medal – first place	1972 Munich	4×100 m medley
World Aquatics Championships
Silver medal – second place	1973 Belgrade	4×100 m medley
Pan American Games
Gold medal – first place	1971 Cali	100 m butterfly
Silver medal – second place	1971 Cali	4x100 m medley

Deena Diane Deardurff (born May 8, 1957), also known by her married name Deena Schmidt, is an American former competition swimmer, Olympic champion, former world record-holder, and former college swim coach.

== Swimming ==
Deardurff swam for the Cincinnati Marlins, a team funded by Charles Keating. One of the team coaches was Paul Bergen, who is reported to have said that swimmers need 12,000 miles of experience in order to compete in the Olympics.

At the age of 15, Deardurff represented the United States at the 1972 Summer Olympics in Munich, Germany. She won a gold medal as a member of the first-place U.S. team in the women's 4×100-meter medley relay, swimming the butterfly leg of the relay. Deardurff and her relay teammates Melissa Belote, Cathy Carr and Sandy Neilson set a new world record of 4:20.75 in the event final. Individually, she also competed in the women's 100-meter butterfly, finishing fourth in the event final with a time of 1:03.95. She also received a silver medal in the women's 4×100-meter medley relay at the 1973 World Aquatics Championships in Belgrade, Yugoslavia.

== Sex abuse ==
Deardurff alleged that she was abused by her coach beginning at age 11, but did not speak about it at the time. She first revealed the abuse to her parents at age 17, later discussing the issue with other coaches and friends. In 2010, she spoke publicly about the issue of sexual abuse by coaches.

== Coaching ==
She was the head coach of San Diego State University's swimming and diving program until her contract was non-renewed in 2007. San Diego State was without a swimming pool facility, and she was battling cancer at the time of her non-renewal. She filed a lawsuit against the school in 2007 and won $1.45 million in settlement.

== Personal life ==
Deardurff resides in El Cajon, California. She has two sons, Michael Ryan Schmidt who swam for UNLV before graduating in May 2004 and Tyler Robert Schmidt who attended San Diego State University and graduated in May 2007.

Deardurff is now a survivor of breast cancer and was named as the Susan G. Komen spokesperson for the 2008 year where she will help spread awareness about early detection for anyone over the age of 40 or with a known family history.

== See also ==
- List of Olympic medalists in swimming (women)
- List of World Aquatics Championships medalists in swimming (women)
- World record progression 4 × 100 metres freestyle relay
- World record progression 4 × 100 metres medley relay
