= Deborah Palmer =

Australian swimmer

Personal information
- Born: 27 February 1957 (age 69)

Sport
- Sport: Swimming

Deborah Palmer (born 27 February 1957) is an Australian former swimmer. She competed in four events at the 1972 Summer Olympics.
