= Hungary at the 1973 World Aquatics Championships =

- Flag of Hungary
- FINA code: HUN
- National federation: Hungarian Swimming Federation
- Website: www.musz.hu (in Hungarian)

in Belgrade, Yugoslavia
- Medals Ranked =4th: Gold 2 Silver 1 Bronze 1 Total 4

World Aquatics Championships appearances (overview)
- 1973; 1975; 1978; 1982; 1986; 1991; 1994; 1998; 2001; 2003; 2005; 2007; 2009; 2011; 2013; 2015; 2017; 2019; 2022; 2023; 2024

Hungary competed at the 1973 World Aquatics Championships in Belgrade, Yugoslavia from August 31 to September 9.

== Diving ==
Athlete	Event	Preliminaries		Final	
Athlete	Event	Points	Rank	Points	Rank
Attila Haimal	Men's springboard	did not start		did not advance	
