= Brenda McGrory =

Irish swimmer

Personal information
- Born: 29 April 1956
- Died: 25 April 2025 (aged 68)

Sport
- Sport: Swimming

Brenda McGrory (29 April 1956 – 25 April 2025) was an Irish swimmer. She competed in three events at the 1972 Summer Olympics.
