= Aisling O'Leary =

Irish swimmer

Personal information
- Born: 7 July 1957 (age 69)
- Died: 29th March 2008

Sport
- Sport: Swimming

Aisling O'Leary (born 7 July 1957) is an Irish former swimmer. She competed in three events at the 1972 Summer Olympics.
