= Patricia López (swimmer) =

Argentine swimmer

Personal information
- Born: 4 February 1956 (age 70)

Sport
- Sport: Swimming

Patricia López (born 4 February 1956) is an Argentine former backstroke, freestyle and medley swimmer. She competed in five events at the 1972 Summer Olympics.
