= Susanne Hilger =

East German swimmer

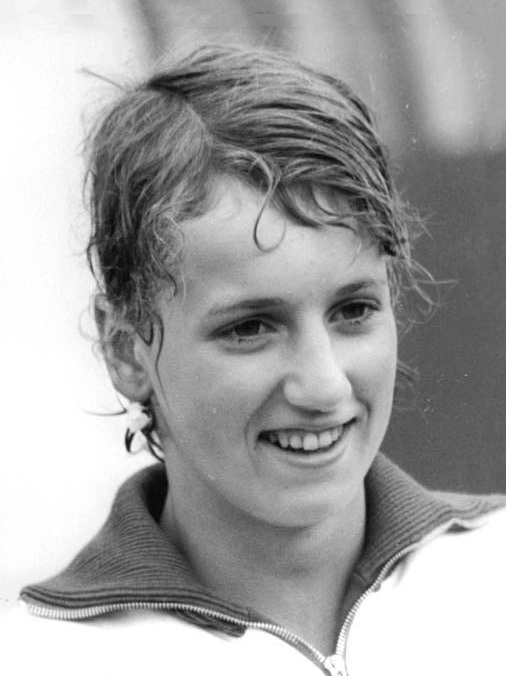
- Susanne Hilger in 1972

Personal information
- Born: 18 April 1958 (age 68) Rostock, Germany
- Height: 1.56 m (5 ft 1 in)
- Weight: 53 kg (117 lb)

Sport
- Sport: Swimming
- Club: SC Empor Rostock

Susanne Hilger (born 18 April 1958) is a retired East German swimmer. She competed at the 1972 Summer Olympics in the 100 m and 200 m backstroke, but failed to reach the finals. Between 1969 and 1973 she won five national titles in these two events.
