= Nataliya Yershova =

Russian swimmer

Personal information
- Nationality: Russian
- Born: 29 April 1955 (age 71)

Sport
- Sport: Swimming

Nataliya Yershova (born 29 April 1955) is a Russian former backstroke swimmer. She competed in two events at the 1972 Summer Olympics for the Soviet Union.
