= Cathy Carr (swimmer) =

American Olympian swimmer

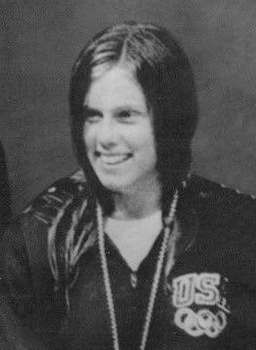
- Carr at the 1972 Olympics

Personal information
- Full name: Catherine L. Carr
- Nickname: "Cathy"
- National team: United States
- Born: May 27, 1954 (age 72) Albuquerque, New Mexico, U.S.
- Height: 5 ft 7 in (1.70 m)
- Weight: 115 lb (52 kg)

Sport
- Sport: Swimming
- Strokes: Breaststroke
- Club: Coronado Navy Swimming Association
- College team: University of New Mexico; University of California, Davis
Medal record
Representing the United States
Olympic Games
Gold medal – first place	1972 Munich	100 m breaststroke
Gold medal – first place	1972 Munich	4×100 m medley
Summer Universiade
Gold medal – first place	1973 Moscow	200 m breaststroke
Gold medal – first place	1973 Moscow	4×100 m medley
Silver medal – second place	1973 Moscow	100 m breaststroke
Silver medal – second place	1973 Moscow	200 m medley

Catherine L. Carr (born May 27, 1954), also known by her married name Cathy West, is an American former competition swimmer, Olympic champion, and former world record-holder in two events.

== Biography ==
Carr was born in Albuquerque, New Mexico, and graduated from Highland High School in Albuquerque. She trained for the Olympics with the Coronado Swim Club under 1960 Olympic gold medalist Mike Troy.

Carr represented the United States at the 1972 Summer Olympics in Munich, Germany. Individually, she won a gold medal in the women's 100-meter breaststroke, setting a new world of 1:13.58 in the final, and besting Soviet Galina Prozumenshchikova by 1.41 seconds. She won a gold medal swimming the breaststroke leg for the first-place U.S. team in the women's 4×100-meter medley relay, together with her teammates Melissa Belote (backstroke), Deena Deardurff (butterfly), and Sandy Neilson (freestyle). The American medley relay team set a new world record of 4:20.75 in the event final, beating the East German and West German teams by 4.16 and 5.71 seconds, respectively.

She held the long course world record in the 100-meter breaststroke (set at the 1972 Olympics) from September 2, 1972, to August 22, 1974. Her world record in the 4×100-meter medley relay survived from September 2, 1972, to September 4, 1973. Carr was inducted into the International Swimming Hall of Fame as an "Honor Swimmer" in 1988.

Carr initially attended the University of New Mexico, before transferring to the University of California, Davis. She swam for the first UC Davis Aggies women's swim team, and graduated in 1977. She used to work at Sierra Vista Elementary School in Vacaville, California teaching third grade, and Pioneer Elementary School in Davis, California teaching the AIM fourth grade class. She is now retired from teaching.

She was inducted into the International Swimming Hall of Fame as an "Honor Swimmer" in 1988.

== See also ==
- List of Olympic medalists in swimming (women)
- List of University of California, Davis alumni
- World record progression 100 metres breaststroke
- World record progression 4 × 100 metres medley relay
