= Annegret Kober =

German swimmer (born 1957)

Personal information
- Born: 4 June 1957 (age 69) Siegen, West Germany
- Height: 1.80 m (5 ft 11 in)
- Weight: 67 kg (148 lb)

Sport
- Sport: Swimming
- Club: Schwimmverein Gemeinschaft Neptun Siegerland
Medal record
Women's swimming
Representing West Germany
Summer Olympics
Bronze medal – third place	1972 Munich	4×100 m medley

Annegret Kober (born 4 June 1957) is a retired German backstroke swimmer who won a bronze medal at the 1972 Summer Olympics in the 4 × 100 m medley relay. In the relay, West Germany used different swimmers in the preliminaries and in the final; Kober swam in the preliminaries. Individually, she finished fourth in the 200 backstroke.
