= Annemarie Groen =

Dutch swimmer (born 1955)

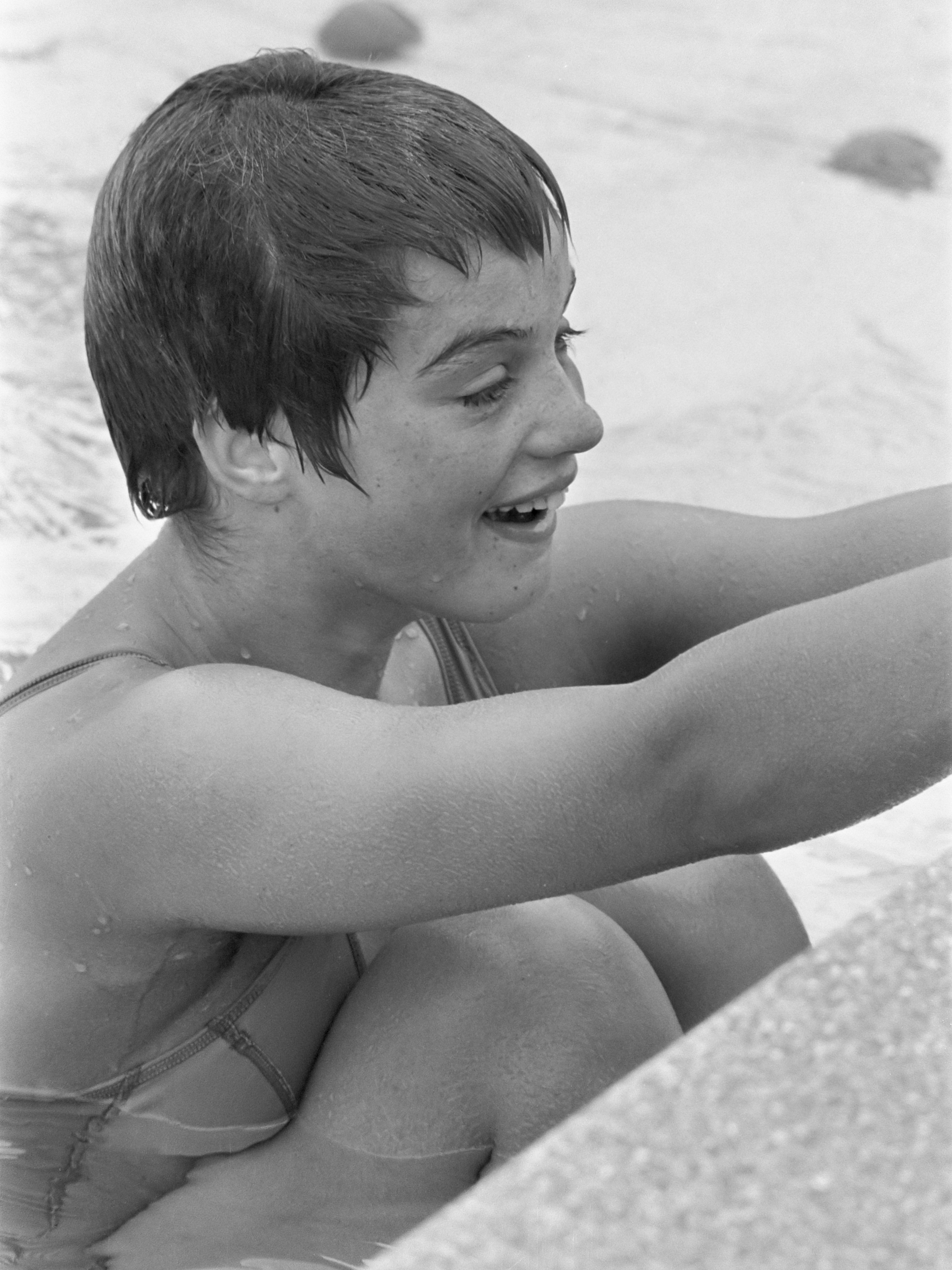
- Groen in 1970

Personal information
- Born: October 16, 1955 (age 70) Naarden, North Holland, Netherlands

Sport
- Sport: Swimming

Annemarie Groen (born October 16, 1955) is a former backstroke swimmer from the Netherlands, who competed for her native country at the 1972 Summer Olympics in Munich, West Germany. There she was eliminated in the qualifying heats of the 100m Backstroke, clocking 1:09.55 (21st place), and the same happened to her in the prelims of the 200m Backstroke, in 2:29.17 (23rd place).
