= Kazu Fujimura =

Japanese swimmer

Personal information
- Born: 2 May 1955 (age 71)

Sport
- Sport: Swimming
- Strokes: backstroke

Kazu Fujimura (藤村 佳津, Fujimura Kazu; born 2 May 1955) is a Japanese former backstroke swimmer. She competed in two events at the 1972 Summer Olympics.
