= Ildikó Szekeres (swimmer) =

Hungarian swimmer

Personal information
- Born: 21 July 1955 (age 71) Pécs, Hungary

Sport
- Sport: Swimming

Ildikó Szekeres (born 21 July 1955) is a Hungarian former swimmer. She competed in two events at the 1972 Summer Olympics.
