= Pamela Bairstow =

British swimmer

Personal information
- Nationality: British
- Born: 15 April 1954 (age 72) Halifax, England

Sport
- Sport: Swimming

Pamela Bairstow (born 15 April 1954) is a British former swimmer. She competed in two events at the 1972 Summer Olympics in Munich.

== Early life ==
She attended Huddersfield High School, a girls' grammar school at Salendine Nook.

She trained at Salendine Nook pool, next to her school. Her coach was George Bole of Fartown.

== Personal life ==
Following her swimming career, Pamela Bairstow married and became known as Pamela Saville. She pursued a successful career in education, eventually becoming a headteacher before retiring. She is the mother of three daughters: Gemma (the eldest), Heather, and Louise.
