= Diana Ashton =

British swimmer

Diane Ashton
Personal information
- Born: 26 September 1955 (age 70)

Sport
- Sport: Swimming
- Club: Wythenshawe Swimming Club

Diane Elizabeth Ashton (born 26 September 1955) is a British former swimmer. Ashton competed in two events at the 1972 Summer Olympics. At the ASA National British Championships she won the 100 metres backstroke title in 1971 and the 200 metres backstroke title in 1972.

== Early life ==
She trained at the South Manchester Swimming Club. When attending the 1972 Olympics, she was the fastest in the UK at 200m.

She attended Levenshulme High School.
