= Susanne Niesner =

Swiss swimmer

Personal information
- Born: 7 October 1954 (age 71)

Sport
- Sport: Swimming

Susanne Niesner (born 7 October 1954) is a Swiss former backstroke and medley swimmer. She competed in five events at the 1972 Summer Olympics.
