= María Cecilia Vargas =

Mexican swimmer

Personal information
- Born: 28 October 1957 (age 68)

Sport
- Sport: Swimming

Achievements and titles
- Olympic finals: 1972 Summer Olympics

María Cecilia Vargas (born 28 October 1957) is a former Mexican backstroke swimmer. She competed in two events at the 1972 Summer Olympics.
