= Andrea Gyarmati =

Hungarian swimmer (born 1954)

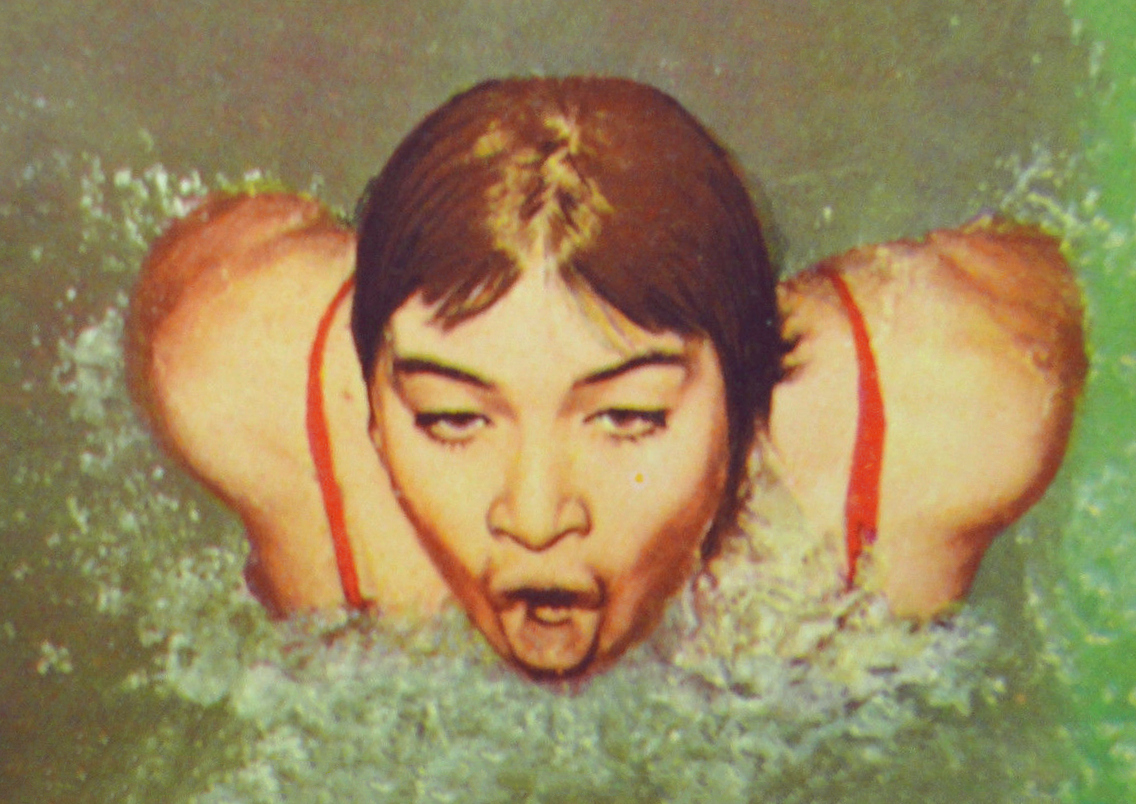
- Gyarmati c. 1972

Personal information
- Born: 15 April 1954 (age 72) Budapest, Hungary
- Height: 170 cm (5 ft 7 in)
- Weight: 64 kg (141 lb)

Sport
- Sport: Swimming
- Strokes: Medley
- Club: BVSC, Budapest; Ferencvárosi TC, Budapest
Medal record
Representing Hungary
Olympic Games
Silver medal – second place	1972 Munich	100 m backstroke
Bronze medal – third place	1972 Munich	100 m butterfly
World Championships (LC)
Bronze medal – third place	1973 Belgrade	200 m backstroke
European Championships (LC)
Gold medal – first place	1970 Barcelona	200 m backstroke
Gold medal – first place	1970 Barcelona	100 m butterfly
Silver medal – second place	1970 Barcelona	100 m backstroke
Silver medal – second place	1970 Barcelona	4×100 m freestyle

Andrea Gyarmati (born 15 April 1954) is a retired Hungarian swimmer. In 1972, she set a world record in the 100-meter butterfly. At the 1972 Olympics she won a silver medal in the 100-meter backstroke, and a bronze medal in the 100-meter butterfly. In 1995, following her both parents, she was inducted into the International Swimming Hall of Fame.

== Biography ==
Gyarmati was born in Budapest. Her mother and coach Éva Székely was a 1952 Olympic champion in breaststroke, and her father Dezső Gyarmati was an Olympic champion in water polo. Gyarmati married and later divorced Mihály Hesz, an Olympic champion in canoe.

She competed at the 1968 and 1972 Olympics in eight events in total, and won two individual medals in 1972 (a silver medal in the 100-meter backstroke, and a bronze medal in the 100-meter butterfly). In 1972 Gyarmati set a world record in the 100 m butterfly in the semifinals. She also won four medals (two gold) at the 1970 European Championships. For these achievements she was named Hungarian Sportswoman of The Year in 1970–1972. In her career, she won 28 Hungarian national championships and set two world records. In 1974, she walked out in the middle of a training session, said she had stopped enjoying competition, refused to compete again, and instead became a pediatrician.

In 1995, following her both parents, Gyarmati was inducted into the International Swimming Hall of Fame.

== See also ==
- List of members of the International Swimming Hall of Fame
- List of select Jewish swimmers

Records
Preceded by (Japan) Mayumi Aoki	Women's 100 metre butterfly world record holder (long course); 31 August 1972 – 1 September 1972	Succeeded by (Japan) Mayumi Aoki
Awards
Preceded by Angéla Németh	Hungarian Sportswoman of The Year; 1970–1972	Succeeded by Ildikó Tordasi
