= Christine Herbst =

East German swimmer

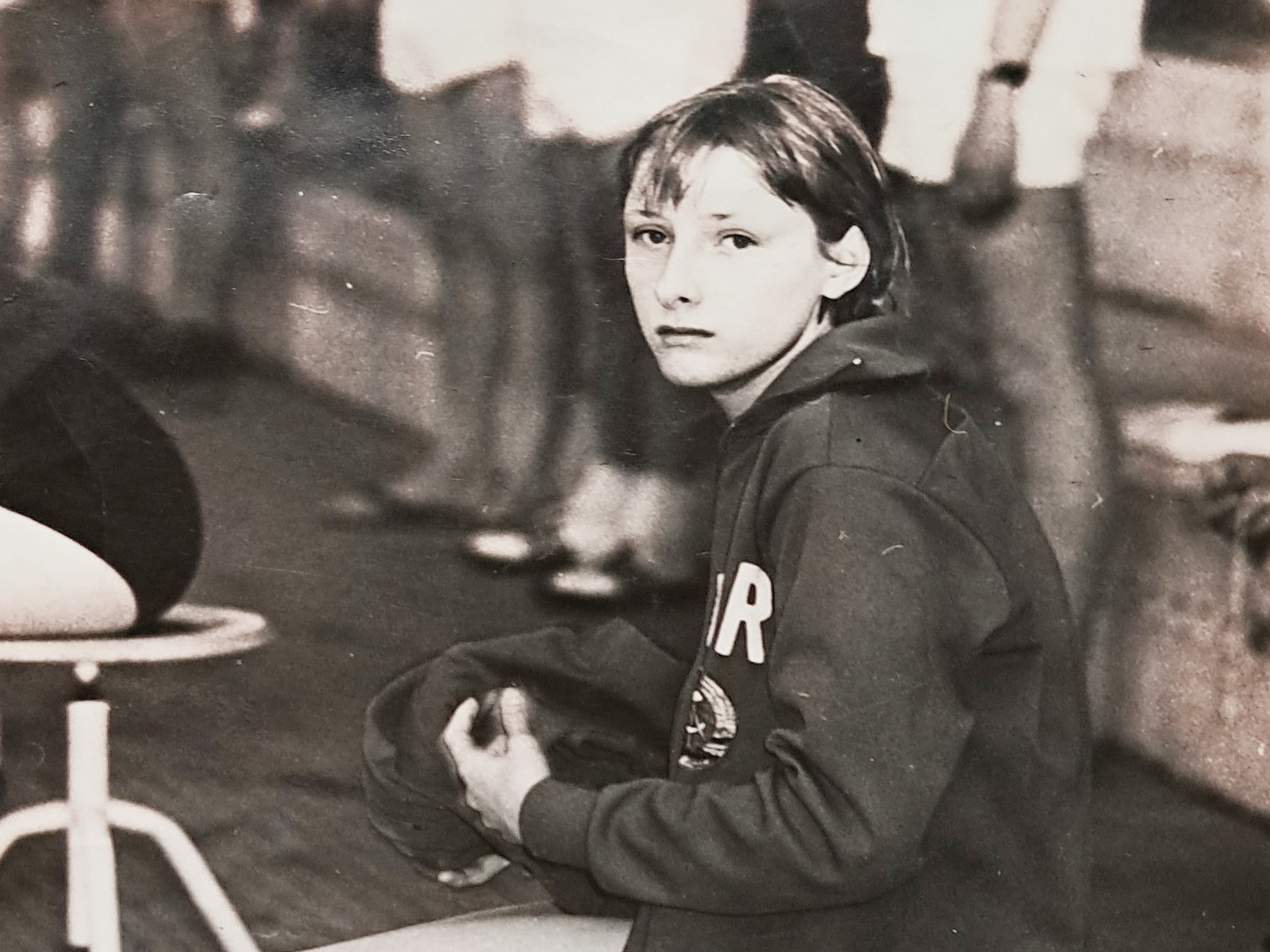

Personal information
- Born: 19 July 1957 (age 69) Dresden
Medal record
Women's swimming
Representing East Germany
Silver medal – second place	1972 Munich	4×100 m medley relay

Christine Herbst (born 19 July 1957 in Dresden) is a German former swimmer who competed in the 1972 Summer Olympics.
