= Christine Fulcher =

Irish swimmer

Personal information
- Born: 20 December 1954 (age 71)

Sport
- Sport: Swimming

Christine Fulcher (born 20 December 1954) is an Irish former swimmer. She competed in four events at the 1972 Summer Olympics.
