= Diana Olsson =

Swedish swimmer

Medal record

Women's swimming

Representing Sweden

European Championships (LC)
Bronze medal – third place	1974 Vienna	4×100 m medley

Diana Olsson (born 28 August 1957) is a former Swedish backstroke swimmer. Olsson participated in the 1972 Summer Olympics and in the 1976 Summer Olympics competing in freestyle, backstroke and relay events. Her best individual Olympic result is a 25th place in the 100 m backstroke 1972.

== Clubs ==
- Stockholmspolisens IF
