= Wendy Hogg =

Canadian swimmer (born 1956)

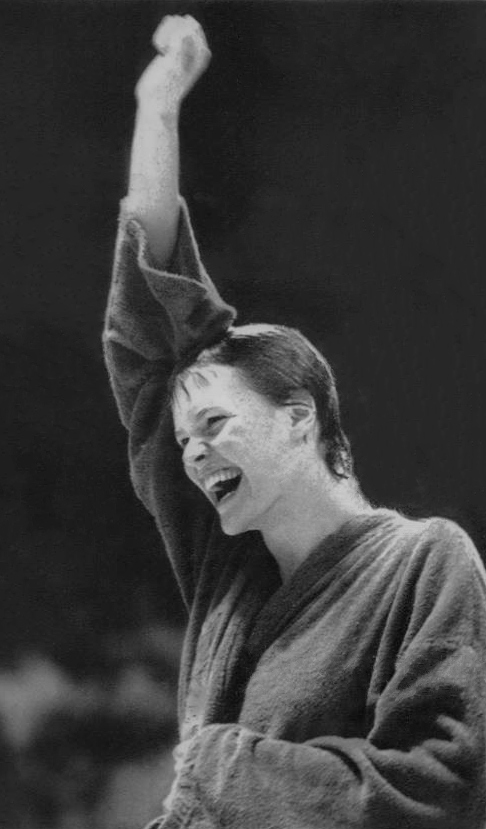
- Cook after setting a world record at the 1974 Commonwealth Games

Personal information
- Full name: Wendy Elizabeth Cook-Hogg
- National team: Canada
- Born: September 15, 1956 (age 69) Vancouver, British Columbia
- Height: 1.75 m (5 ft 9 in)
- Weight: 64 kg (141 lb)

Sport
- Sport: Swimming
- Strokes: Backstroke, freestyle
- Club: Pacific Dolphins, Vancouver
- Coach: Howard Firby; Deryk Snelling; Jack Kelso; Doug Hogg
Medal record
Representing Canada
Olympic Games
Bronze medal – third place	1976 Montreal	4×100 m medley
World Championships
Bronze medal – third place	1973 Belgrade	100 m backstroke
Commonwealth Games
Gold medal – first place	1974 Christchurch	100 m backstroke
Gold medal – first place	1974 Christchurch	200 m backstroke
Gold medal – first place	1974 Christchurch	4×100 m medley

Wendy Elizabeth Hogg née Wendy Cook (born September 15, 1956) is a female retired Canadian swimmer.

== Swimming career ==
She competed in backstroke and medley relay events at the 1972 and 1976 Olympics and won a bronze medal in the relay in 1976; in the individual 100 m backstroke she placed fourth in 1976 and fifth in 1972. At the 1973 World Championships she won a bronze medal in the 100 m backstroke and placed fifth in the medley relay. At the 1974 Commonwealth Games, she won gold medals in the 100 and 200 m backstroke and in the medley relay, setting a world record in the 100 m backstroke; she finished fourth in the 400 m individual medley. In 1974, she was named Canadian athlete of the year, and in 1990 inducted into the British Columbia Sports Hall of Fame.

Cook took up swimming early, and was included to the national team aged 14. By 1976 Olympics she was married to her coach Doug Hogg. Despite being of Canadian nationality she won the 1974 ASA National British Championships 100 metres backstroke and 200 metres backstroke titles.

== Personal life ==
She graduated in physical education from the University of Alberta, and had a teaching certificate from the University of British Columbia. After retiring from competitions around 1979 she briefly worked as a swimming coach and then became a school teacher. As of 2013 she served as the principal of Pinewood Elementary School in Cranbrook, British Columbia.
