= Sue Lewis =

Australian swimmer

Personal information
- Born: 28 December 1954 (age 71)

Sport
- Sport: Swimming

Sue Leonie Lewis (born 28 December 1954) is an Australian former swimmer. She competed in three events at the 1972 Summer Olympics.
