= Sylvie Le Noach =

French swimmer

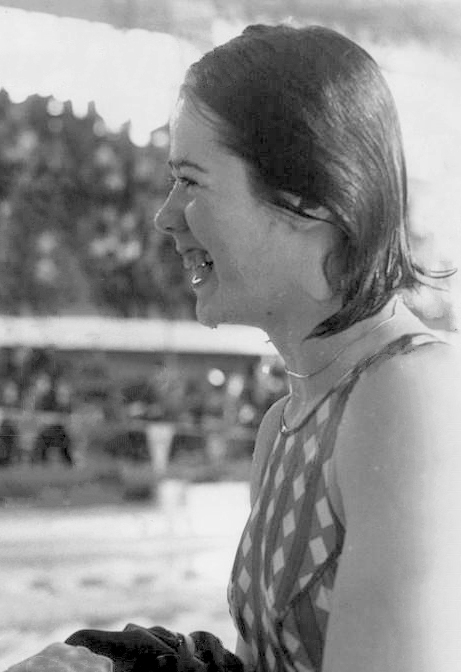
- Le Noach in 1974

Personal information
- Born: 2 July 1955 (age 70)
- Height: 1.65 m (5 ft 5 in)
- Weight: 54 kg (119 lb)

Sport
- Sport: Swimming
- Club: EN Tours, Tours
Medal record
Representing France
European Championships
Bronze medal – third place	1974 Vienna	4×100 m freestyle

Sylvie Le Noach (born 2 July 1955) is a retired French swimmer. At the 1972 Summer Olympics, she competed in the 4 × 100 m medley relay and 100 m and 200 m backstroke, but did not reach the finals. She won a bronze medal in the 4 × 100 m freestyle relay at the 1974 European Aquatics Championships. She finished sixth in the same event at the 1976 Summer Olympics.
