= Shane Gould =

Australian swimmer (born 1956)

Shane Gould AM MBE
- Gould in 1973

Personal information
- Full name: Shane Elizabeth Gould
- National team: Australia
- Born: 23 November 1956 (age 69) Sydney, New South Wales, Australia
- Height: 1.71 m (5 ft 7 in)
- Weight: 59 kg (130 lb)
- Spouses: Neil Innes (1974); Milton Nelms (2007)

Sport
- Sport: Swimming
- Strokes: Freestyle, medley
- Club: Forbes Carlile Swimming
- Coach: Forbes Carlile
Medal record
Women's swimming
Representing Australia
Olympic Games
Gold medal – first place	1972 Munich	200 m freestyle
Gold medal – first place	1972 Munich	400 m freestyle
Gold medal – first place	1972 Munich	200 m medley
Silver medal – second place	1972 Munich	800 m freestyle
Bronze medal – third place	1972 Munich	100 m freestyle

Shane Elizabeth Gould AM MBE (born 23 November 1956) is an Australian former competition swimmer. She won three gold medals, a silver medal and a bronze, at the 1972 Summer Olympics, becoming the first woman swimmer to win five individual medals. In 2018, she won the fifth season of Australian Survivor, becoming the oldest winner of any Survivor franchise.

Gould was born in Australia, but spent most of her childhood in Fiji after she and her family moved there. After her 1972 Olympic performance, Gould was named the Australian of the Year, and received an MBE in 1981. In April 2018, Gould was awarded an Order of Merit by the Australian Olympic Committee.

Gould returned in the 1990s as a swimming mentor and competitor, and again competed in 2003, specializing in the 200m Individual Medley. In 1999, she published her autobiography Tumble Turns. In 2018, she competed on Australian Survivor: Champions vs. Contenders and won, receiving $500,000 as the Sole Survivor. Gould later returned for Australian Survivor: All Stars, but was voted out first.

== Early education ==
Gould was born in Sydney, New South Wales, on the first day of competition of the 1956 Summer Olympics in Melbourne. She moved to Fiji with her family at the age of 18 months. By the age of six, she was a competent swimmer. She attended primary school at Brisbane's St. Peters Lutheran College, currently the top-rated swim school in Australia. At St. Peters, a sporting house is named after her. She attended secondary school at Turramurra High School, Sydney, where a sporting house is also named after her and fellow Olympian Gail Neall.

From around February to June 1973, during her high school junior year, she attended St. Francis High School in Mountain View, California. While at St. Francis, she was coached by Hall of Fame Coach Nort Thornton with the Foothill Aquatics Club. While attending St. Francis, she planned to compete in the Santa Clara International Invitational in June, and Cincinnati's National AAU Championships in April. Two years earlier in the Santa Clara Invitational in July 1971 she set her third world record, lowering the previous mark in the 400-meter freestyle formerly set by Karen Moras in London a few months earlier.

=== Coaching received ===
Gould was trained by leading coaches Ursula and Forbes Carlile and their assistant Tom Green at the Forbes and Ursula Carlile Swimming Organization. She won all of her world swimming titles while a teenager, travelling widely. Carlile, a two-time Olympic Coach for Australia, was a physiologist at the University of Sydney, and at the forefront of providing scientific training to athletes. A leader in the use of interval workouts timed with pace clocks and in the use of heart rate tests for assessing effort, he helped popularize "tapering", a method that slowly reduced training intensity in the weeks before important meets to maximize performance. He helped develop the crawl stroke, focusing on a high speed two beat kick which emphasized the strong use of the arms, a technique studied and adopted by Gould.

== Swimming career ==
=== 1972 Munich Olympics ===
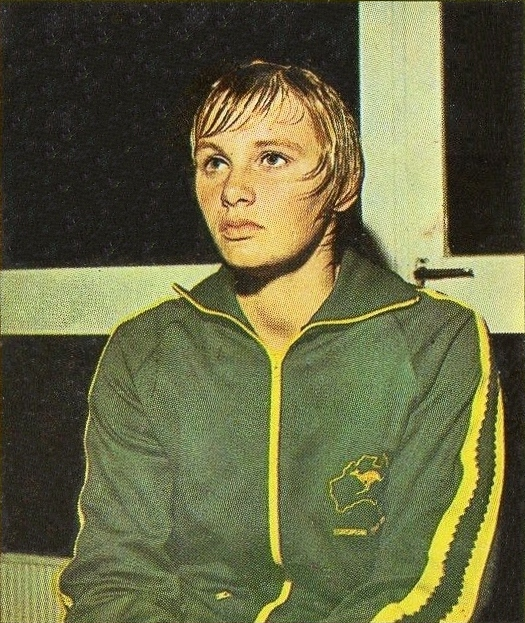
Gould in 1972

At the 1972 Summer Olympics in Munich, West Germany, Gould won three gold medals in the 200 and 400-meter freestyle, and the 200-meter individual medley, setting a world record in each race. She won a silver in the 800 and a bronze in the 100-meter freestyle events.

She is the only person, male or female, to hold 5 Long Course Meters world records simultaneously. She held every world freestyle record from 100 metres to 1500 metres from 12 December 71 to 4 August 72. On 4 August 1972 her world record in the 200 freestyle was broken at the United States Olympic trials. On 28 August 1972 she set the 200-metre individual medley world record bringing her active world records back to 5. She is the first female swimmer ever to win three Olympic gold medals in world record time, and the first swimmer, male or female, to win Olympic medals in five individual events in a single Olympics. She is also the only Australian to win three individual gold medals at a single Olympics.

At the age of 16, she retired from competitive swimming, citing pressures placed upon her by her success and media profile.

Over two decades later, Gould returned to competitive swimming at the Masters level. She set Australian Masters records (40–44 years 100m, 200 m, and 400 m freestyle, and 100 m butterfly) and 45–49 years (50 m butterfly, 100 m and 200 m freestyle). In 2003, she broke the world record for the 45–49 years 200 m individual medley in 2:38.13 (beating the 1961 world record for all ages).

She coaches swimmers and still swims in Masters competitions.

== Later career ==
=== Education ===
Gould returned to study in the late 2000s. She studied at the Sydney Film School (2007, Cert IV documentary film, Digital Filmmaking) and was awarded a Master of Environmental Management (2010, with a thesis on the social uses and functions of public swimming pools), and a Master of Contemporary Art (2012, with a video piece Loops and Lines). Both degrees are from the University of Tasmania. In 2019 she was awarded a Doctor of Philosophy (PhD) degree from Victoria University.

=== Olympics ===
In the 2000 Summer Olympics in Sydney, Gould carried the Olympic Torch at the stadium, as one of the runners for the final segment, before the lighting of the Olympic Flame.

=== Photography ===
Gould is a photographer with works on display with the Art of the Olympians.

=== Biography ===
In 1999, Gould published her autobiography Tumble Turns: An Autobiography.

=== Australian Survivor ===
In August 2018, it was revealed that Gould would be participating in Australian Survivor: Champions vs. Contenders and would be a part of the Champions tribe. On 9 October 2018, Gould was crowned the winner of Australian Survivor: Champions vs. Contenders in a 5–4 vote against criminal barrister Sharn Coombes. With this win, Gould became the oldest person to ever win any international series of Survivor.

She later returned for Australian Survivor: All Stars, but was voted out first, finishing in 24th place.

=== The Traitors ===
In October 2025, Gould was announced as a contestant for the forthcoming third season of Network 10's The Traitors Australia.

== Personal life ==
Gould spent most of the years after ending competitive swimming out of the public eye. She married Neil Innes at 18, became a Christian, and lived on a working farm near Margaret River in Western Australia's South West. She farmed and taught horseriding and surfing, making very few public appearances. She has four children and eight grandchildren.

Her marriage to Innes ended after 22 years, coinciding with a return to public life, and she married Milton Nelms in 2007.

On 10 October 2023, Gould was one of 25 Australians of the Year who signed an open letter supporting the Yes vote in the Indigenous Voice referendum. The open letter was initiated by psychiatrist Patrick McGorry.

== Publications ==
- Gould, S. 1999, updated 2003. Tumble Turns. HarperCollins. ISBN 9780732277673 (autobiography)
- Gould, S. 2004. Fit for 50+. Ibis Publishing Australia.
- Gould, S. 2007. Appreciating swimming: beauty and instruction with underwater swimmer photographs. Visual Communication 6: 170–179. doi:10.1177/1470357207077180

== Honours and awards ==
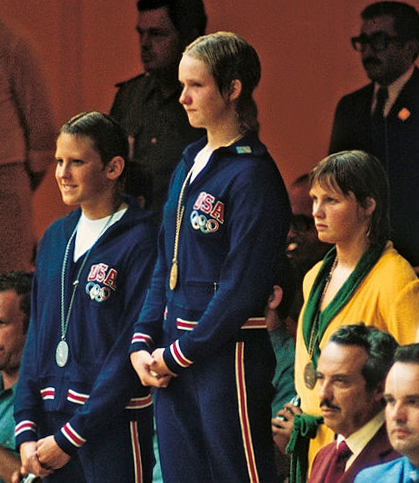
Gould (right) with Sandy Neilson (middle) and Shirley Babashoff (left) in 1972

- Best Sportswoman in the World (1971)
- ABC Sportswoman of the Year (1971)
- ABC Sportswoman of the Year (1972)
- Australian of the Year (1972)
- International Swimming Hall of Fame "Honor Swimmer" (1977)
- Member of the Order of the British Empire (1981 Birthday Honours)
- Sport Australia Hall of Fame (1985)
- Olympic Order (1994)
- Olympic Torch bearer (2000)
- Australian Sports Medal (2000)
- Centenary Medal (2001)
- Sole Survivor (2018) Australian Survivor Champions Vs. Contenders
- Swimming Australia Hall of Fame (2022) - inaugural inductee.

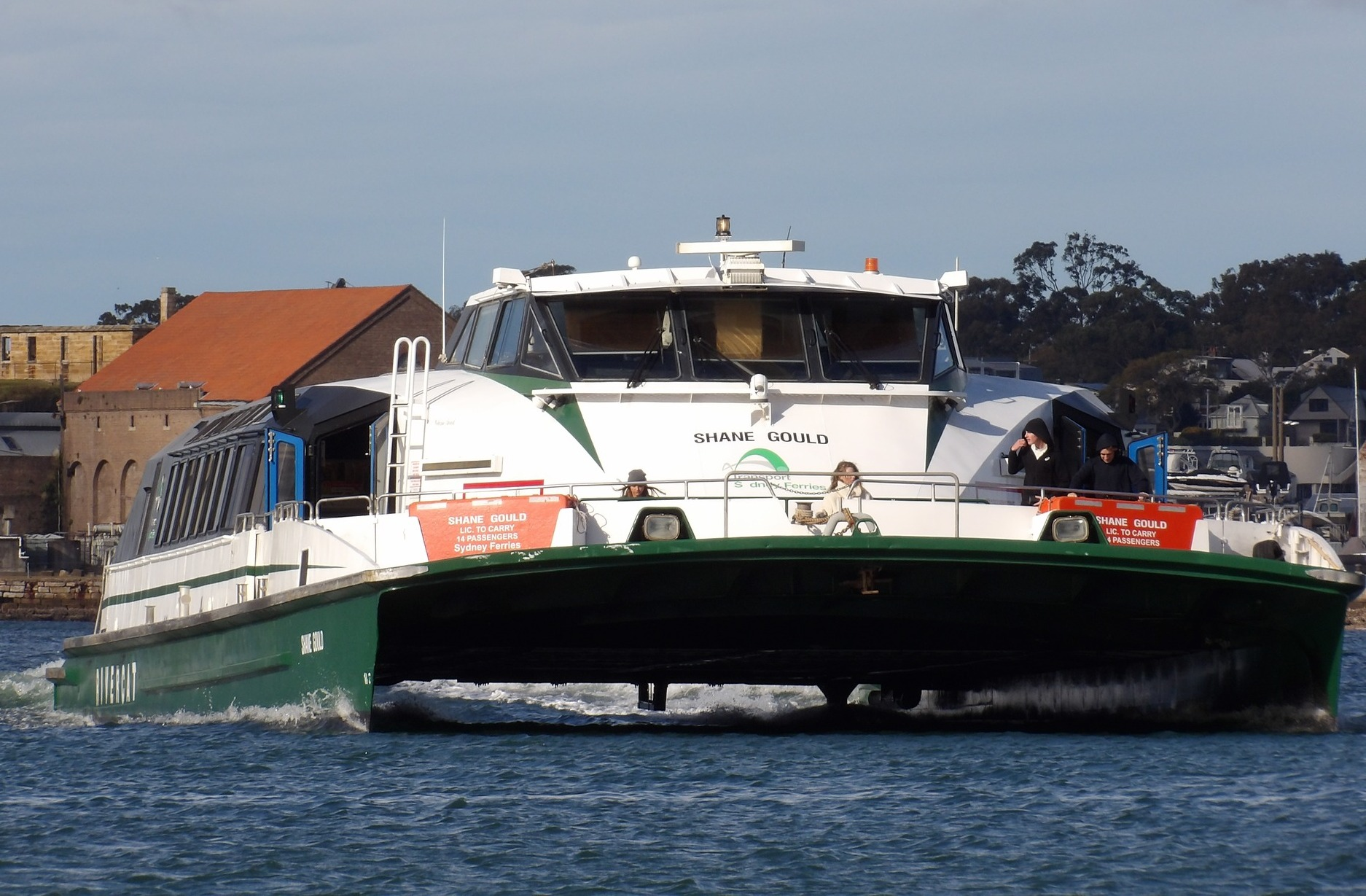
RiverCat MV Shane Gould at Drummoyne ferry wharf

In 1993, the State Transit Authority named a RiverCat ferry after Gould. On 30 September 2025, the Rivercat ferry "Shane Gould" was retired from service.

== See also ==
- List of members of the International Swimming Hall of Fame
- List of multiple Olympic medalists at a single Games
- List of Olympic medalists in swimming (women)
- World record progression 100 metres freestyle
- World record progression 200 metres freestyle
- World record progression 200 metres individual medley
- World record progression 400 metres freestyle
- World record progression 800 metres freestyle
- World record progression 1500 metres freestyle

Records
Preceded by Dawn Fraser	Women's 100 metres freestyle world record holder (long course); 30 April 1971 – 13 July 1973	Succeeded by Kornelia Ender
Preceded by Debbie Meyer; Shirley Babashoff	Women's 200 metres freestyle world record holder (long course); 1 May 1971 – 4 August 1972; 1 September 1972 – 2 August 1974	Succeeded by Shirley Babashoff; Kornelia Ender
Preceded by Karen Moras	Women's 400 metres freestyle world record holder (long course); 30 April 1971 – 22 August 1973	Succeeded by Keena Rothhammer
Preceded by Ann Simmons	Women's 800 metres Freestyle world record holder (long course); 3 December 1971 – 6 August 1972	Succeeded by Jo Harshbarger
Preceded by Debbie Meyer	Women's 1500 metres freestyle world record holder (long course); 12 December 1971 – 25 August 1973	Succeeded by Jo Harshbarger
Preceded by Claudia Kolb	Women's 200 metres individual medley world record holder (long course); 28 August 1972 – 13 April 1973	Succeeded by Kornelia Ender
