= Australian Survivor: All Stars =

Australian reality show

- Season 7
- Presented by: Jonathan LaPaglia
- No. of days: 50
- No. of castaways: 24
- Winner: David Genat
- Runner-up: Sharn Coombes
- Location: Savusavu, Fiji
- No. of episodes: 24

Release
- Original network: Network 10
- Original release: 3 February – 30 March 2020

Additional information
- Filming dates: 26 August – 14 October 2019

Season chronology
- ← Previous; Champions V Contenders II Next → Brains V Brawn

Australian Survivor: All Stars is the seventh season of Australian Survivor which aired on Network 10. This all-star edition features 24 returning contestants from the four previous seasons that have aired on the network. The season premiered on 3 February 2020, and concluded on 30 March 2020, where David Genat was named the winner over Sharn Coombes, winning the grand prize of A$500,000 and title of Sole Survivor.

Jonathan LaPaglia returned as host. However, due to the COVID-19 pandemic, LaPaglia could not travel from Los Angeles, where he resides, in time for the recording of the season finale and reunion without facing immediate self-isolation for 14 days. The reunion special was hosted by Osher Günsberg, with LaPaglia contributing from Los Angeles via Satellite link.

== Contestants ==
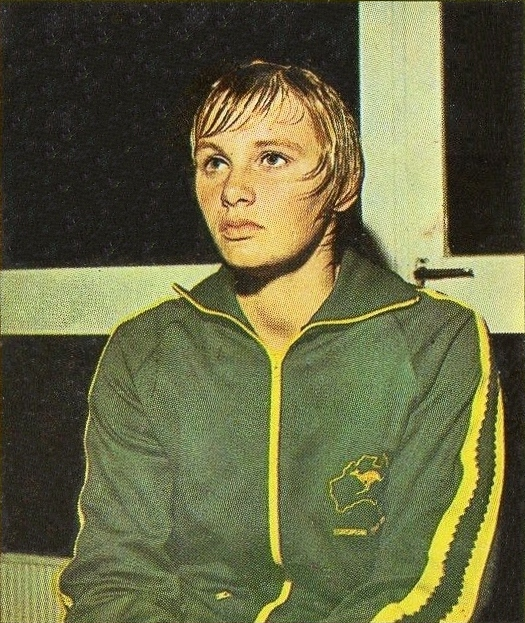
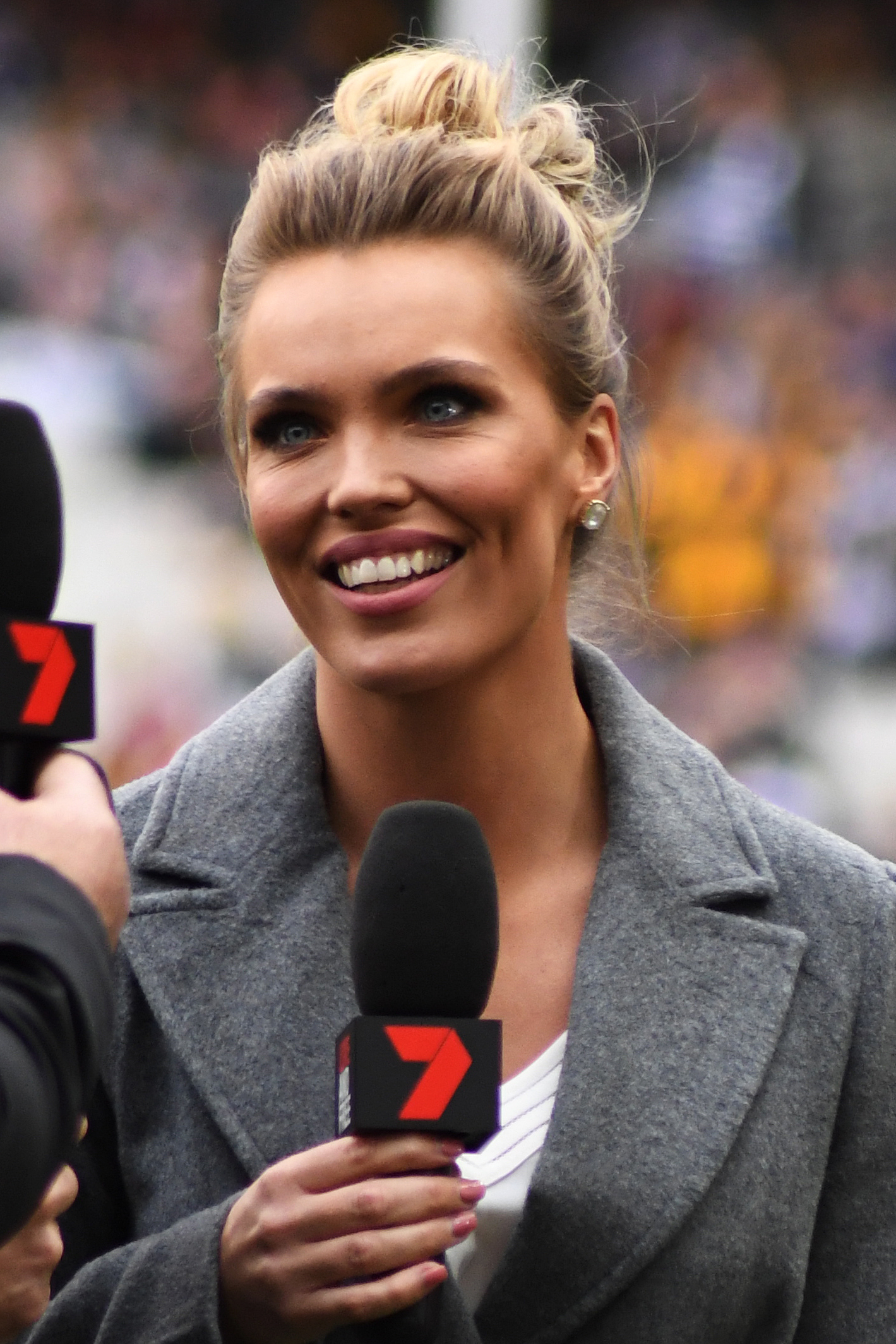
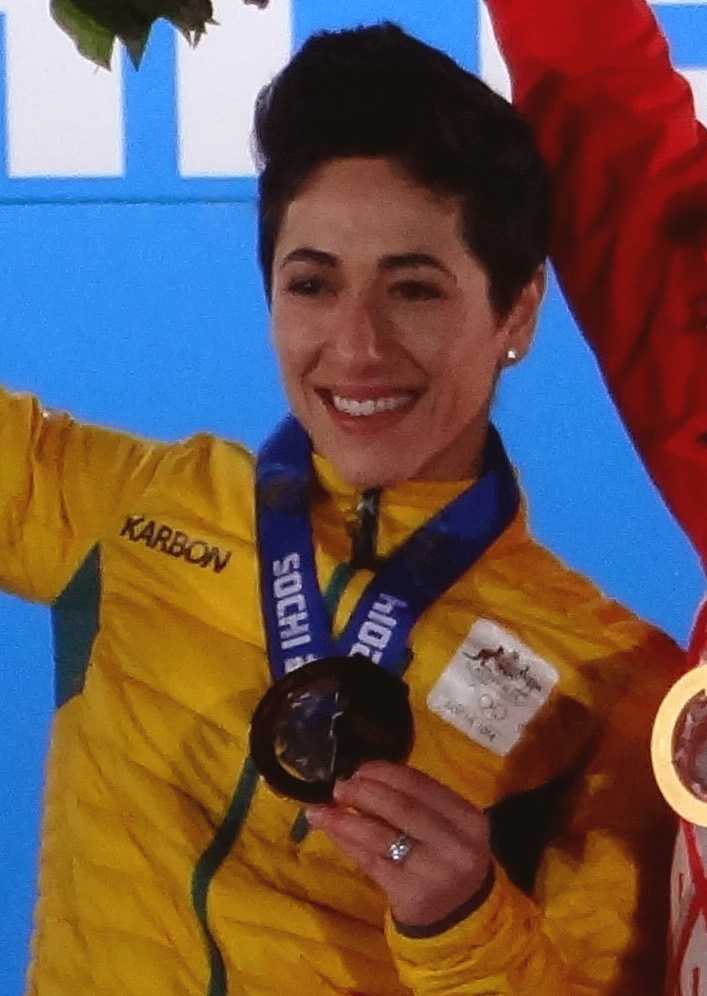
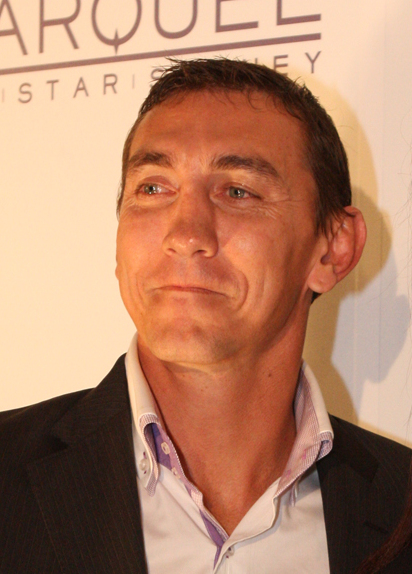
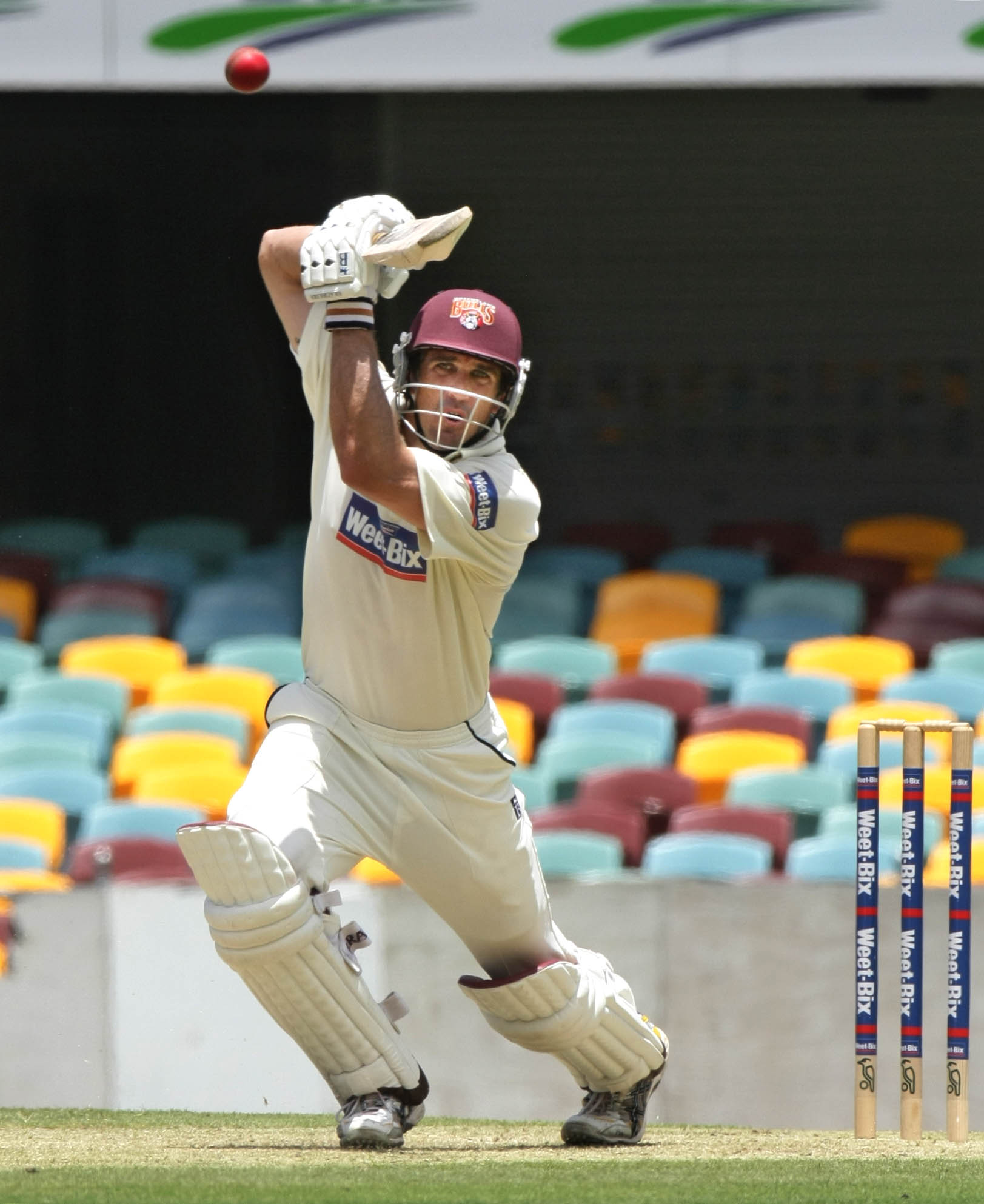
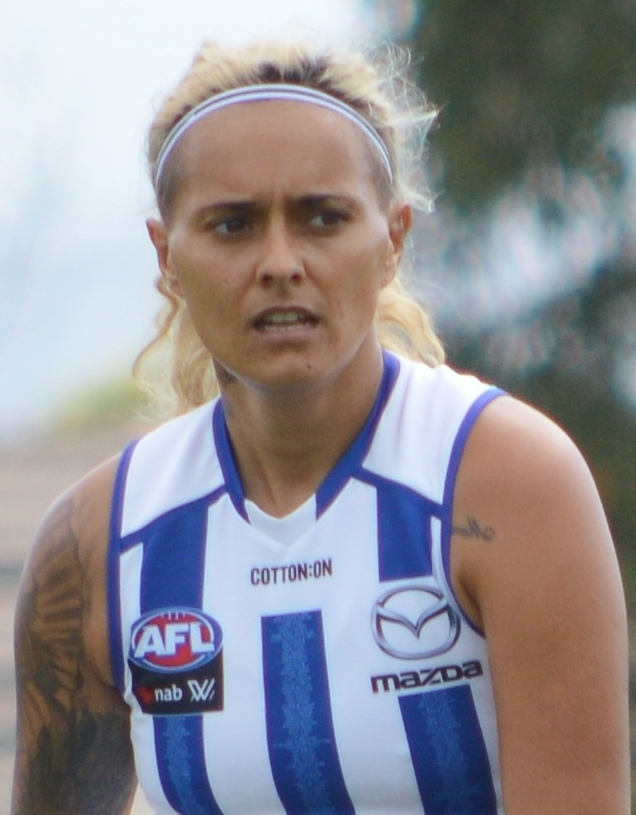
From left to right: Shane Gould, Abbey Holmes, Lydia Lassila, Mat Rogers, Lee Carseldine and Moana Hope

This season consisted of twenty-four contestants returning from previous seasons. The cast included no previous contestants from the first two seasons.

List of Australian Survivor: All Stars contestants
Contestant	Original tribe	Shuffled tribe	Merged tribe	Finish
Shane Gould; 62, Bicheno, TAS; Champions V Contenders	Mokuta			1st voted out Day 2
Jericho Malabonga; 27, Melbourne, VIC; 2017	Vakama			2nd voted out Day 5
Daisy Richardson; 24, Brisbane, QLD; Champions V Contenders II	Vakama			3rd voted out Day 7
Michelle Dougan; 35, Sydney, NSW; 2017	Mokuta			4th voted out Day 9
Henry Nicholson; 28, Adelaide, SA; 2017	Mokuta			5th voted out Day 12
Abbey Holmes; 28, Melbourne, VIC; Champions V Contenders II	Mokuta	Vakama		6th voted out Day 16
Lydia Lassila; 37, Lorne, VIC; Champions V Contenders	Mokuta	Vakama		Lost fire duel (Note: On Day 18, both Mokuta and Vakama attended Tribal Council to vote out a castaway. The 7th and 8th castaways voted out would compete against each other in a fire-making duel. The winner returned to their tribe and remained in the game, while the loser was eliminated. Lydia and Phoebe were voted out. Phoebe won the duel and returned to Mokuta, eliminating Lydia.); Day 18
John Eastoe; 29, Kalgoorlie, WA; Champions V Contenders II	Mokuta	Vakama		9th voted out Day 20
Mat Rogers; 43, Gold Coast, QLD; Champions V Contenders	Vakama	Vakama		10th voted out Day 22
Phoebe Timmins; 30, Melbourne, VIC; 2016	Vakama	Mokuta		11th voted out Day 24
Felicity "Flick" Egginton; 26, Gold Coast, QLD; 2016	Vakama	Vakama		12th voted out Day 26
Nick Iadanza; 31, Adelaide, SA; 2016	Mokuta	Mokuta		13th voted out Day 28
Locky Gilbert; 30, Perth, WA; 2017	Vakama	Vakama	Kalokalo	14th voted out 1st jury member Day 30
Harry Hills; 30, Perth, WA; Champions V Contenders II	Mokuta	Vakama	Kalokalo	15th voted out 2nd jury member Day 32
Lee Carseldine; 43, Brisbane, QLD; 2016	Mokuta	Mokuta	Kalokalo	Withdrew (Note: Lee withdrew from the game due to a family emergency. He did not serve as a member of the jury.); Day 33
Zach Kozyrski; 40, Perth, WA; Champions V Contenders	Mokuta	Mokuta	Kalokalo	16th voted out (Note: After being Exiled and losing two Exile challenges to re-enter the game, Zach was voted out over A.K. and Shonee in the Exiled Tribal Council.); 3rd jury member Day 38
Jacqui Patterson; 52, Byron Bay, NSW; 2017	Vakama	Mokuta	Kalokalo	17th voted out 4th jury member Day 40
Shonee Fairfax; 27, London, England; Champions V Contenders	Mokuta	Vakama	Kalokalo	18th voted out 5th jury member Day 42
Aaron "A.K." Knight; 32, Adelaide, SA; 2017	Vakama	Vakama	Kalokalo	Lost Trial by Fire (Note: On Day 44, after the players cast their votes, Jonathan offered the Final 6 players to not reveal the votes, should a player accept a "Trial By Fire" to stay in the game - failing the trial would eliminate the participating player. Upon accepting the trial, the other 5 players had to unanimously choose a challenger for the player participating in the "Trial By Fire" - who would not be at risk of elimination. AK accepted the offer, and the tribe chose Moana as his challenger. AK lost his trial and was eliminated.); 6th jury member Day 44
Mark "Tarzan" Herlaar; 53, Toowoomba, QLD; 2017	Vakama	Mokuta	Kalokalo	19th voted out 7th jury member Day 46
Brooke Jowett; 26, Melbourne, VIC; 2016	Vakama	Vakama	Kalokalo	20th voted out 8th jury member Day 47
Moana Hope; 31, Melbourne, VIC; Champions V Contenders	Vakama	Mokuta	Kalokalo	21st voted out 9th jury member Day 49
Sharn Coombes; 42, Melbourne, VIC; Champions V Contenders	Mokuta	Mokuta	Kalokalo	Runner-up; Day 50
David Genat; 39, Brooklyn, New York; Champions V Contenders II	Vakama	Mokuta	Kalokalo	Sole Survivor; Day 50

=== Future appearances ===
In 2023, Shonee Bowtell (formerly Fairfax) competed as a villain in Australian Survivor: Heroes V Villains.

In 2025, Bowtell returned again alongside David Genat to compete on the Aussie tribe for Australian Survivor: Australia V The World.

In 2026, Harry Hills and Brooke Jowett competed on Australian Survivor: Redemption.

Outside of Australian Survivor, Locky Gilbert appeared on the eighth season of The Bachelor Australia as the titular bachelor in 2020. Genat competed on the fifth season of The Celebrity Apprentice Australia. Michelle Dougan competed in the tenth episode of The Cube in 2021 with her sister Sam. In 2022, Jowett and John Eastoe competed on The Challenge: Australia. Rogers competed on the second season of The Summit in 2024. In 2025, Genat competed on the second season of the American reality show Deal or No Deal Island. In 2026, Shane Gould and Henry Nicholson competed on the third season of The Traitors.

== Season summary ==
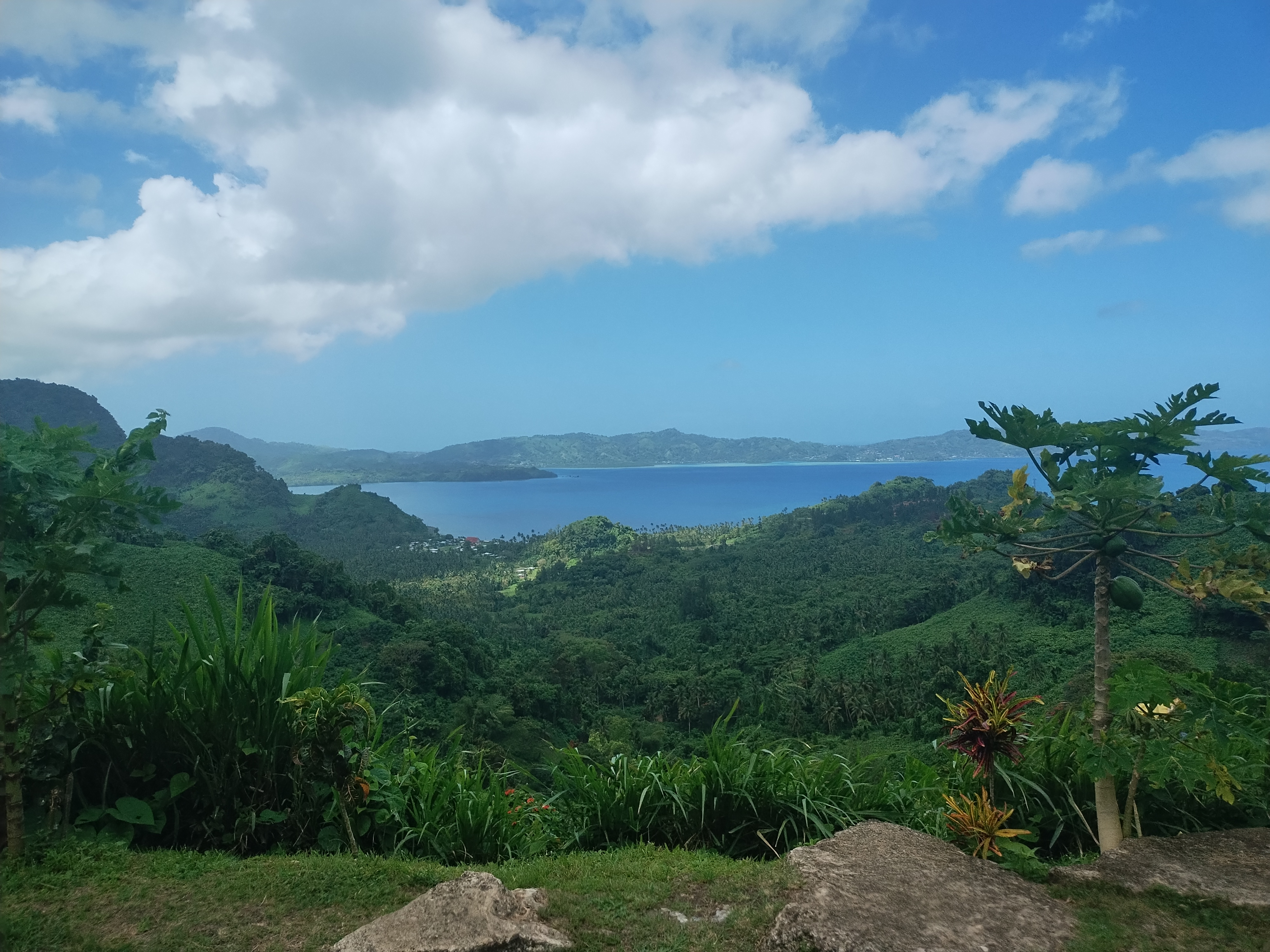
The season filmed in Savusavu in Fiji.

24 All Stars from the previous four seasons were divided into two tribes, Mokuta and Vakama. Immediately, returning winners Shane and Jericho were picked off as they were major threats to the other contestants, leaving power players Henry and Mat on the back foot in Mokuta and Vakama with a clue for the same idol. Henry got it first. On Vakama, two groups formed spearheaded by David and Mat respectively, but David approached Mat to blindside his own alliance and to take revenge on Daisy for her blindside of him in their previous season. Henry gave Mat the idol, which got Daisy out. Mokuta struggled in challenges with the athletic players taking control to eliminate the more social players.

After a tribe swap, the new Vakama saw the majority alliance lose David and Phoebe, but utilized a scorned Shonee to take out the athletic alliance (Abbey, Lydia, and John) and the original minority leader, Mat. Meanwhile, the new Mokuta tribe managed to keep intact for a while, except when Phoebe didn't vote with David, and he and Moana chose to blindside Phoebe. Meanwhile, David found an immunity idol in a tree, and then got another one by stealing Phoebe's clue which led him to find it in a termite mound. Closer to the merge, a shrinking Vakama saw Brooke enact her revenge on Flick as payback for their first season, and Harry finding a Halting advantage which allowed him to halt any of the last two pre-merge tribal councils before the votes are read; he never exercised his advantage, sacrificing Nick.

At the merge, the new Mokuta alliance rallied together to take out the surviving Vakama members. Despite enjoying early success by eliminating physical and social threats, fractures formed in the Mokuta alliance when it was announced six players would compete against one another to remain in the game. Zach was betrayed by Jacqui who opted to flip on the alliance, though she was voted off for her actions shortly thereafter. After losing her Vakama allies, Brooke went on an immunity run to force the majority to cannibalize each other but fell short at the final four. David won the final immunity challenge and sent Moana to the jury in fear of her strategic game, over the ruthless double agent Sharn.

At the final Tribal Council, Sharn was criticized for her lying and baiting the Vakama minority for too long, and questioning her jury management compared to her first season. David had been painted as controlling and domineering throughout the entire season. Highlighting his charismatic social game at the original Vakama, including possessing two idols at the same time, and protecting his Mokuta allies where he could, David managed to convince the jury that his social and strategic dominant game was stronger than Sharn's, awarding him the title of Sole Survivor in an 8–1 vote.

Challenge winners and eliminations by episode

Tribal phase (Day 1–28)
Episode		Challenge winner(s)		Eliminated	Finish
No.	Air date	Reward	Immunity	Eliminated	Finish
1	3 February 2020	Mokuta	Vakama	Shane	1st voted out Day 2
2	4 February 2020	Vakama	Mokuta	Jericho	2nd voted out Day 5
3	5 February 2020	Mokuta	Mokuta	Daisy	3rd voted out Day 7
4	10 February 2020	Vakama	Vakama	Michelle	4th voted out Day 9
5	11 February 2020	Mokuta	Vakama	Henry	5th voted out Day 12
5	11 February 2020	[Locky, Phoebe] (Note: Locky and Phoebe used a Reward Ticket advantage that allowed two players from their tribe to join a reward won by the opposite tribe.)	Vakama	Henry	5th voted out Day 12
6	12 February 2020	Vakama	Vakama	No elimination on Day 14 due to exile vote. (Note: Instead of voting out a tribemate, the Mokuta tribe participated in an exile vote, with the top 2 vote recipients being exiled. Shonee and Zach were voted into exile.)	
7	17 February 2020	Mokuta	Mokuta	Abbey	6th voted out Day 16
8	18 February 2020	None	Brooke (Note: As both Mokuta and Vakama were to attend Tribal Council on Day 18, each tribe competed among themselves for individual immunity. Jacqui and Brooke won their tribe's immunity challenge.)	Lydia	7th voted out (Note: Both Mokuta and Vakama attended Tribal Council on Day 18. The person voted out of each tribe would compete against each other in a fire-making duel. The winner returned to their tribe and remained in the game, while the loser was eliminated. Lydia and Phoebe were voted out. Phoebe won the duel and returned to Mokuta, eliminating Lydia.); Day 18
8	18 February 2020	None	Jacqui	Phoebe	8th voted out Day 18
8	18 February 2020	None		Lydia	Lost Fire Duel; Day 18
9	19 February 2020	Survivor; Auction	Mokuta	John	9th voted out Day 20
10	24 February 2020	Mokuta	Mokuta	Mat	10th voted out Day 22
11	25 February 2020	Vakama	Vakama	Phoebe	11th voted out Day 24
12	26 February 2020	None	Mokuta	Flick	12th voted out Day 26
13	2 March 2020	Mokuta	Vakama	Nick	13th voted out Day 28
13	2 March 2020	[Brooke, Shonee] (Note: Mokuta got to pick two people from Vakama to join them on reward. They picked Brooke and Shonee.)	Vakama	Nick	13th voted out Day 28

Individual phase (Day 29–50)
Episode		Challenge winner(s)		Eliminated	Finish
No.	Air date	Reward	Immunity	Eliminated	Finish
14	3 March 2020	Lee	Shonee	Locky	14th voted out 1st jury member Day 30
15	4 March 2020	None	Brooke	Harry	15th voted out 2nd jury member Day 32
16	9 March 2020	Brooke, David, Moana, Sharn, Zach	Shonee	Lee	Withdrew (Note: Lee withdrew from the game due to a family emergency. He did not serve as a member of the jury.); Day 33
16	9 March 2020	Brooke, David, Moana, Sharn, Zach	Shonee	No elimination on Day 34 or Day 36 due to exile votes. (Note: On Days 34 and 36, instead of voting a castaway out of the game, the Kalo Kalo tribe voted to send castaways into exile. The 3 players with the most votes at each Tribal Council were exiled. Of the 6 exiled castaways, one would officially be eliminated from the game. On Day 34, A.K., Brooke, & Moana were exiled. On Day 36, Jacqui, Shonee, & Zach were exiled.)	
17	10 March 2020	None	Sharn	No elimination on Day 34 or Day 36 due to exile votes.	
18	11 March 2020	None	Brooke, Moana (Note: On Days 37 and 38, the 6 Exiled castaways competed in a two challenges to earn to return to the Kalo Kalo tribe. Moana & Brooke won the first challenge, while Jacqui won the second challenge. The remaining Exile castaways (AK, Shonee & Zach) faced a Tribal Council vote. Zach was voted out.)	Zach	16th voted out 3rd jury member Day 38
18	11 March 2020	None	Jacqui	Zach	16th voted out 3rd jury member Day 38
19	16 March 2020	David [Moana, Sharn, Tarzan]	David	Jacqui	17th voted out 4th jury member Day 40
20	17 March 2020	None	Brooke	Shonee	18th voted out 5th jury member Day 42
21	18 March 2020	None	Brooke	A.K.	Lost Trial by Fire (Note: On Day 44, after the players cast their votes, Jonathan offered the Final 6 players to not reveal the votes, should a player accept a "Trial By Fire" to stay in the game - failing the trial would eliminate the participating player. Upon accepting the trial, the other 5 players had to unanimously choose a challenger for the player participating in the "Trial By Fire" - who would not be at risk of elimination. AK accepted the offer, and the tribe chose Moana as his challenger. AK lost his trial and was eliminated.); 6th jury member Day 44
22	23 March 2020	None	Brooke	Tarzan	19th voted out 7th jury member Day 46
23	24 March 2020	None	David	Brooke	20th voted out 8th jury member Day 47
24	30 March 2020	None	David	Moana	21st voted out 9th jury member Day 49
24	30 March 2020			Final vote	
24	30 March 2020			Sharn	Runner-up; Day 50
24	30 March 2020			David	Sole Survivor; Day 50

In the case of multiple tribes or castaways who win reward or immunity, they are listed in order of finish, or alphabetically where it was a team effort; where one castaway won and invited others, the invitees are in brackets.

== Episodes ==
No. overall	No. in season	Title	Timeline	Original release date
127	1	"Episode 1"	Days 1—2	3 February 2020
24 Australian Survivor All Stars returned to Savusavu, Fiji to settle scores, change legacies, and push themselves to become the next Sole Survivor. They had been divided into two tribes (Mokuta in green and Vakama in yellow), and they immediately began the game with their first reward challenge.: Reward Challenge: Tribes pushed a heavy sled to collect firewood supplies across a sandy beach course. Once the tribe felt they had enough supplies, they returned to the start to build a giant bonfire. One tribe member raced to the end of the course to retrieve a torch to light their bonfire. The first tribe to cut their bonfire's rope won the "Ultimate Tribe Camp": a completely built shelter, with a working fire pit.; Mokuta won the challenge, despite overloading their sled with firewood supplies and taking longer to build their bonfire. Henry found a clue to a hidden immunity idol at his tribe's torch, and let Mat know there likely would be a clue on Vakama's torch. The clue informed both men that there would be an idol hidden in a tree at Tribal Council and only valid for the first three Tribal Councils. Mokuta enjoyed the luxuries of their new camp, with Shane trying to reconcile with Lydia for her blindside in their original season and bonding with Henry. Harry, however, was suspicious of Shane's obvious idol searching and was reminded how Shane played such a successful under the radar game previously. At Vakama, Tarzan identified Locky, Mat, and David as the three early Alpha males of the tribe. David found himself immediately bonding with most of Vakama, unlike in his last season. Mat was determined to get a hold of the idol at Tribal and use it to improve his game. The tribe struggled over their first night, having to build their own shelter.: Immunity Challenge: The tribes navigated through an obstacle course consisting of A-frames and crashing through stick tunnels, with the second stage having four tribe members holding up standing platforms for the rest to traverse onto a platform. Those same four tribe members then smashed open wooden boxes holding five balls, and held open a chute for two more tribe members to shoot their balls into. The first tribe to land all five balls into their chute won immunity.; After Vakama won the challenge, Mat approached John to keep Shane, checking in with her as well. Back at Mokuta, Lydia felt that the first vote was the best opportunity to eliminate Shane to get her revenge, but chose to let Harry take the charge in rallying the numbers. Harry's work put him in Shane's radar, with Shane trying to bring in Sharn and Henry to target Harry. Henry was determined to make a big move right away and thought taking out a big game player like "Dirty Harry" was a significant start to All Stars. Henry thought about grabbing the idol at Tribal and immediately using it to blindside Harry. However, when Henry presented this to Nick, Nick tried to dissuade Henry from playing too big a game from the get-go. At Tribal Council, Shane and Lydia's past was brought up, with Shane trying to declare that there is a clean slate. The tribe also discussed whether people should start playing intense, strategic games or just play it safe to start out the season. In the end, Shane's words fell on deaf ears as Harry and Lydia managed to rally the votes to vote out the former winner. As Mokuta left Tribal Council, Henry lagged behind the group and grabbed the idol out of the tree.
128	2	"Episode 2"	Days 3—5	4 February 2020
On Mokuta, Henry hoped to use his new idol to improve his position after he found himself being targeted by Harry after last Tribal. Harry established a new alliance with Shonee and Nick - dubbed "The Little Rascals" - with Harry hoping to take Henry out soon. On Vakama, David and Locky became the first contestants to start a fire without flint in three days. The tribe was split down the middle in terms of alliances; the younger group - Locky, Brooke, Phoebe, Flick, Daisy, David, and A.K. - countered the older group - Mat, Moana, Jericho, Tarzan, and Jacqui.: Reward Challenge: Three members from each tribe faced off on a floating deck to push their opponents off the deck and into the water. The first tribe to push all the opposing tribe members into the water scored a point and the first tribe to three points won an opportunity to go to the Survivor Store to select items that will help them survive.; During the challenge, Zach felt his knee pop, which forced Mokuta to forfeit one of the rounds. Vakama won reward and chose Phoebe and Locky to visit the store to choose five items ranging from food items to comfort items to essential survival items. They chose three survival items, including flint, a jar of cookies, and an advantage in the game which allows two members of Vakama to attend a reward challenge that Mokuta wins. Back at camp, Locky and Phoebe hid the cookies from the tribe and lied about the advantage stating that only the two of them can be sent on the reward, though Jericho doubted Locky and Phoebe being honest about the visit. In order to solidify their alliance, Locky and Phoebe shared the cookies with the members of their alliance, a tactic similar to what Jericho did in his previous season.: Immunity Challenge: The tribes scrambled under an obstacle and up a cargo net to a tower. They then dropped six barrels down a chute and ran them over rails, placing them all on crates. Two people then threw sandbags trying to land them on each barrel. The first tribe to land a sandbag on each barrel won immunity.; Mokuta won the challenge. Back at Vakama, the majority alliance discussed voting out Moana due to her performance in the challenge and her close friendship with Mat. David, worrying about an idol, proposed that the alliance instead vote out Jericho as a strong social player who won before. However, Phoebe and A.K. debated whether voting out Jericho was the right move and Phoebe observed that she's created such a close bond with Jericho that she doesn't want to see him go so soon. Mat and Jericho approached Phoebe and A.K. asking them to flip to their side and vote out Daisy. At Tribal Council, the tribe acknowledged that there is a clear division, with A.K. declaring he was in the middle and admitting his vote was up for grabs. An emotional Jericho expressed how hard this vote is for him as he has formed so many bonds. In the end, A.K. and Phoebe decided to stick with their original alliance, voting out Jericho in a 7-5 vote and sending the last former winner home.
129	3	"Episode 3"	Days 6—7	5 February 2020
On Vakama, Daisy, Brooke, and Phoebe were smitten with Locky, and Locky himself admitted to liking Brooke. Mat, Moana, Jacqui, and Tarzan found themselves on the bottom of the tribe, but Mat believed he could save his group by convincing Henry to give him his idol at the next immunity challenge. David was surprised to be in a majority position this time around, but he sought revenge against Daisy after she blindsided him in their previous season. David approached Mat to work together, but behind the scenes, where they would use their respective alliances to take other tribe members out of the game. On Mokuta, Lee and Sharn bonded over their past second-place finishes in their respective seasons and sought to improve their games and find redemption.: Reward Challenge: The tribes participated in three challenges used before in Australian Survivor. The first to two points won coffee for the tribe. The first challenge consisted of the contestants building a block puzzle and knocking it over with sandbags. The second challenge involved one person holding up a net while two other contestants threw coconuts into the net. The first person to drop the net lost.; Mokuta won the challenge, and Mat asked Henry if he would give him the idol that Henry found at Tribal if Vakama lost as the idol was only good for the first three Tribals. Back at camp, Mokuta received a magazine that depicted significant moments from previous seasons. Harry grew concerned when he found his picture on the cover page, worrying that his reputation will get him voted out soon. Zach's article was about his past comments about women, but he was determined to rise above that and be better this time socially. On Vakama, Mat and David tested their trust when Mat revealed that he can get an idol. Mat proposed that David tell him who will be voted out, Mat will play the idol on them, and then Mat's alliance would vote someone out of David's alliance. David asked that Mat's alliance vote out Daisy to get his revenge.: Immunity Challenge: Three members from each tribe attempted to push a heavy wooden ball into a goal. The tribes can attack or defend their goals and use whatever force necessary to stop the other tribe. The first tribe to score two goals won immunity.; Mokuta won the challenge. After the challenge, Henry gave his idol to Mat, but A.K. saw the exchange occur. Back at camp, A.K. told his alliance that Mat had an idol and they decided to vote for Jacqui as they believed it would be unlikely Mat would play the idol on Jacqui. They told Mat they would vote Moana out to make him misplay the idol. However, David told Mat that the alliance would vote for Jacqui. Mat, determined to get power back on his side, decided to trust David and use the idol. Meanwhile, to counter the plan being foiled, the majority alliance decided to hunt for an idol on their beach, which Brooke found in a tree trunk. David was concerned about this new idol because it could ruin his plans and it could be used against him later, so he asked Mat to spread word around camp that David would get votes so David could convince Brooke to use the idol on him tonight and then all the idols would be out of play. At Tribal Council, the tribe discussed the division following the previous vote. Mat and David both exchanged words regarding the other's approach to the game. Mat stated that he's been forced into a minority position, but he intended on sticking with his loyalties tonight and criticized the majority alliance. Mat also attempted to get Locky to flip. Before the votes were read, Mat played his idol on Jacqui, prompting Brooke to play hers on David. In the end, the majority alliance's votes for Jacqui were negated, and Mat's alliance followed David's plan and eliminated Daisy.
130	4	"Episode 4"	Days 8—9	10 February 2020
On Vakama, the tribe marveled at Jacqui's new body building physique. Mat celebrated his successful idol play and hoped to find another idol. Locky believed there was a mole in the majority alliance who told Mat to play his idol on Jacqui since Mat's plan worked out too well. David was pleased that he got rid of both idols, got Daisy out, and solidified his alliance with Mat, but he hoped nobody would find out that he was working with Mat. On Mokuta, Henry was glad that he helped Mat out, but he felt like he was on the bottom of the tribe. Henry believed he had a strong alliance with Nick, but Nick deemed Henry to be playing the game too hard and standing out too much by trying to flip votes. In order to try and prevent Henry from ruining his game, Nick talked strategy with him so he would always know Henry's strategic plans.: Reward Challenge: Two contestants faced off pushing against a heavy wooden box with the goal of pushing their opponent off the platform and into the water. The first tribe to score three points won a fish and chips meal.; Before the challenge began, A.K. revealed to the other tribe that Henry gave Mat an idol at the last immunity challenge. Vakama won the challenge. Back at Vakama, the tribe discovered their reward was actually fishing gear and potatoes instead of an actual prepared meal. Expecting an idol or a clue, everyone searched among the supplies and Mat found an idol hidden in the crate, though several tribemates saw this occur. Moving forward, Mat believed that he had established some trust with David and told Moana that David told him Jacqui would get votes, to solidify his true alliance with Moana. Moana was pleased that Mat was able to make this deal, but she didn't fully trust David. Moana intended on settling her unfinished business from her season by playing a quieter, in the shadows game. David grew concerned that Mat was becoming too powerful with his new idol and his position in the game, so David cut the diamond-like knob off of the tackle box from the reward and crafted a fake idol out of it for potential future chaos.: Immunity Challenge: Every member of the tribe held onto a rope attached to a heavy barrel. If the contestant cannot hold the barrel any longer, they can hand it off to another tribe member, but can no longer participate in the challenge. The first tribe to drop one of their barrels lost.; Michelle and Sharn for Mokuta dropped out of the challenge early, which helped Vakama win immunity. During the challenge, Shonee sat out for Vakama; a piece of paper was hidden underneath the sit out bench, but she never discovered it. Back at Mokuta, Michelle felt vulnerable after her performance in the challenge. The tribe's general consensus was to keep strength and Michelle was considered the weakest. However, Henry saw Michelle as a potential ally and tried to convince the tribe to vote out Sharn instead, as he believed Sharn to be a huge physical and strategic threat. Nick observed Henry scrambling to flip the vote and believed that the tribe needed to vote out Henry as he was playing too intense of a game. Nick gathered the tribe and proposed voting Henry out for his intense gameplay and to prevent him from dividing the tribe with his antics. Everyone began to question whether Henry, Michelle, or Sharn is the best person to vote out. At Tribal Council, the tribe discussed why they lost the challenge and what skills they would need to win the next Immunity Challenge. Michelle pitched to her tribe that she can contribute other skills to the team and asked them to consider all her other assets. The tribe discussed voting to keep the tribe strong and cohesive. Ultimately, the vote was split between Henry, Sharn, and Michelle. However, the majority decided to keep itself strong rather than worry about strategic threats; thus, Michelle was voted out.
131	5	"Episode 5"	Days 10—12	11 February 2020
On Mokuta, Lee and John bonded over their shared sense of humor. Nick was concerned that Henry was still in the game because the previous night's vote showed Henry that he was truly on the bottom. Nick continued his campaign against Henry by reminding people that Henry has made significant moves so early in the game and cannot be trusted. Henry was aware he was on the bottom, but he hoped to continue proving his strength in challenges so the athletes on the tribe would keep him safe and vote Shonee out next as the next perceived weakest competitor. On Vakama, Locky and Brooke's relationship was growing. The tribe was still divided in terms of alliances. Mat has been openly wearing the idol around his neck to make Locky paranoid and remind the majority alliance that he still had power in the game.: Reward Challenge: Members from each tribe faced off one at a time and aimed to knock down their opponent's hand-held idol to the ground. The first tribe to four points won ice-cream cones with toppings.; Mokuta won reward. After the challenge, Locky and Phoebe decided to use the reward advantage, but the tribe realized the reward could have been given to anyone on Vakama based on the way Jonathan asked who was going on the reward. While on the reward, Phoebe and Locky tried to get information on Mokuta's strategy and dynamics, but nobody gave them anything. While enjoying the reward, Shonee discovered a rolled up piece of paper hidden inside of a log and found a clue to an idol hidden under the tribe's well. Shonee was able to dig up the idol and revealed to Nick that she found it. The two were very happy because it could keep Shonee safe and they could hopefully use it to blindside Henry.: Immunity Challenge: Each tribe had to roll logs into slots on a ramp to form a staircase and retrieve a mallet. Three tribe members then used the mallet to hammer in nails to release a wooden box from a tunnel. The tribe then raced through the tunnel and across a mud-pit. Once each member is through, the tribe used a catapult to launch five balls into a basket. The first tribe to land five balls in the basket won immunity.; Vakama won the challenge. Back at camp, Nick continued his campaign to vote out Henry and tried to split the votes between Henry and Zach so Shonee could keep her idol. However, John, Lee, Lydia, and Abbey were concerned about keeping the tribe strong and weren't entirely convinced. The tribe debated between voting out Shonee or Henry. Lydia warned Henry that the vote was up in the air and he should play an idol if he had one. Henry created a fake idol and decided he would plant it at Tribal Council and grab it before the vote, and he hoped it would scare people into not voting him out. At Tribal Council, the tribe discussed their past votes and whether they were becoming a stronger, more cohesive tribe with their decisions. Shonee and Henry both expressed their vulnerabilities to the tribe. Henry did grab the fake idol, but Nick accused Henry of planting it and doubted it was real. After the votes were cast, Shonee did play her real idol and negated five votes. However, the remainder of the tribe decided Henry was too big of a threat to keep in the game any longer and Henry was voted out.
132	6	"Episode 6"	Days 13—14	12 February 2020
On Mokuta, the tribe was in need of a challenge win after losing two immunity challenges in a row. Shonee was happy to still be in the game, but she knew the sporty alliance of Abbey, Lydia, John, and Lee wanted to see her voted out next. Shonee, Nick, and Harry believed if they didn't act soon, the athletes would be in control of the tribe. The three approached Sharn and Zach to work with them on the next vote. Zach recalled on his first season, he just wanted to be the competition beast but now he wanted to add a social game to his overall gameplay. On Vakama, David was happy to sit back and watch Locky and Mat battle it out for control. Mat has continued to wear his idol openly to throw off Locky because Mat knew Locky wanted control of the tribe and Mat's idol prevented this from happening. Mat and Locky did discuss working together on the next vote, but neither could agree on which person should be voted out.: Reward Challenge: Tethered together in pairs, each tribe had to avoid a trip-obstacle and place blocks on a balance beam so that they fall like dominoes. The first tribe to have their dominoes reach the end of the beam won an Italian feast consisting of pasta, garlic bread and wine at Mama's Kitchen.; Vakama won the challenge. During the reward, the tribe discovered that Mama's Kitchen contained pictures of the contestants with their mothers and the tribe got to reminisce on family.: Immunity Challenge: In pairs, each tribe swam to a platform, climbed a ladder and jumped off to cross a net. They then dove down to release and retrieve a ball from an underwater chute. Once all four balls have been collected, the last tribe member then had to shoot the balls into a goal. The first tribe to land all four balls won immunity.; During the challenge, John struggled underwater and could not get the ball out of the chute, leading to Vakama winning immunity. Back at camp, Mokuta was upset that they were going to Tribal Council for the third time in a row. Abbey, Lydia, John, and Lee were determined to vote out Shonee because they perceived her as weakest. Sharn and Zach found themselves in the middle between the athletes and the Little Rascals coming to them for numbers. Sharn had some concerns that she might be seen as physically weakest once Shonee is gone. Zach recalled that voting people out just based on physical strength never ends well so he approached Harry and Sharn with an idea to work together. The three discussed voting John out after his performance in the last challenge and because they found John to be a huge social threat. However, Nick didn't think voting out John was the right move because it would destroy established relationships on Mokuta. In order to save Shonee, Nick approached the athletes and told them that Zach was targeting John to see if they could vote Zach out instead. Nick hoped that since Zach didn't have strong alliances on Mokuta, the tribe would be willing to get rid of him and keep Shonee. At Tribal Council, Shonee was clinging onto hope that people would follow the plans that were discussed. Nick whispered to the athletes to vote for Zach. John also acknowledged his terrible performance in the challenge. Before the vote, Jonathan revealed the vote would be different as the two people with the highest number of votes would go to Exile Beach instead of going home. The tribe voted and Shonee and Zach received the two highest number of votes, sending them to Exile Beach.
133	7	"Episode 7"	Days 15—16	17 February 2020
On Exile Beach, Shonee was hoping to get back in the game and get revenge on her former Mokuta tribe. On Mokuta, Nick was upset that he lost Shonee, whilst Abbey believed that she had perfectly positioned herself in the tribe. On Vakama, despite the split, Mat believed that he had a solid position with his four person alliance and secret alliance with David. All of this changed as, before the reward challenge, Jonathan informed everyone to drop their buffs. The tribes were switched, Shonee and Zach returned to the game with Shonee going to Vakama and Zach going back to Mokuta.: Reward Challenge: Members of each tribe faced off in a tug of war match with the goal of getting their side across the line and grabbing a tribe flag. The first tribe to three points won a meal as well as a "Pandora's Box" that contained an advantage.; Mokuta won the challenge. On new Vakama, there was an even split between old Vakama and old Mokuta members. However, neither side was completely loyal to tribal lines. Mat had ended up on a tribe without his former allies or David, plus Lydia who he blindsided in their season, so he felt this was the worst case scenario. Abbey was also concerned that Shonee was set on getting revenge for being voted out. Shonee was glad to be a part of Vakama and she was intent on getting revenge on old Mokuta, starting with Abbey as she saw her as the ring leader on old Mokuta. On new Mokuta, David and Phoebe felt some concern as they had ended up on a tribe with Tarzan, Jacqui, and Moana with the rest being former Mokuta. David hoped to establish some ties with Zach as he had just been voted out. The tribe discovered that Pandora's Box contained an advantage for one person and there were two keys hidden in the jungle that would both open the box. However, only one person would get the advantage. Both Nick and Jacqui found keys, Nick shared his discovery with Phoebe to establish trust, and he was able to get the advantage. It was revealed that Nick had earned an extra vote that he could use at one Tribal Council before the merge.: Immunity Challenge: Seven members of the tribe pulled a heavy cart along a course and collected puzzle pieces along the way. Two members of the other tribe attempted to stop them. At the end, they used the pieces to solve a large cube puzzle. The first tribe to solve the puzzle won immunity.; Mokuta won immunity. Back at Vakama, Abbey and Lydia were frustrated with all of the challenge losses and were determined to get rid of Shonee once and for all. Abbey and Lydia approached Locky, Brooke, Flick, and A.K. to band together as a strong unit to get Shonee out. Their plan was the six of them, plus John, would split the votes between Shonee and Mat. However, Shonee was determined to get her revenge on Abbey and also approached the same four, plus Harry, to vote out Abbey. Shonee believed that Abbey was in charge of old Mokuta and if Vakama got rid of her, then the old alliances on Mokuta would crumble. Mat was also concerned about where he stood and he aligned himself with Shonee to hopefully establish new ties. Locky, Brooke, Flick, and A.K. realized they were the swing votes and could determine whether Shonee or Abbey would leave. At Tribal Council, the tribe discussed the effects of the tribe swap. Both Shonee and Mat discussed the concept of grudges and whether they should be forgotten or played on. The tribe also discussed what would keep them strong as Mokuta had beaten them twice. When the votes were read, there was a split between Shonee, Abbey, Lydia, and Mat, but the old Vakama alliance decided to weaken old Mokuta and voted Abbey out of the game.
134	8	"Episode 8"	Days 17—18	18 February 2020
On Mokuta, David tried to find out who opened Pandora's Box. Nick assessed the tribe's voting blocks were Lee/Sharn/Nick, David/Phoebe, and Moana/Tarzan/Jacqui, and Nick worried about who would take power. Moana was ready to take control of the game and intended to use a quiet, subtle strategy to take control of Mokuta. On Vakama, Shonee was pleased that she got her revenge on Abbey and hoped to get revenge on Lydia next. Lydia and John knew they were on the bottom of the tribe and needed to find new allies. Mat was upset that he had to work with the majority last night, but he believed he had no other choice on this tribe since his alliance ended up on new Mokuta and he could not work with Lydia because he blindsided her in their previous season. Before the immunity challenge, Jonathan informed the players that they would not be playing for tribal immunity, but rather individual immunity. Jonathan announced that both tribes would be going to Tribal Council that night to vote out one tribe member each.: Immunity Challenge: Contestants had to stand with their arms outstretched while pressing against two weighted discs with their palms and fingers. If they dropped a disc or touched the edge, they were out of the challenge. The last remaining contestant from both tribes would win individual immunity.; Jacqui from Mokuta and Brooke from Vakama won immunity. At Vakama, the majority alliance discussed sticking with the pecking order and splitting the vote between Lydia and John. However, Lydia and John proposed to A.K., Locky, and Brooke that they join with them and blindside Mat as he had an idol and Lydia wanted revenge for her previous season. Mat observed that Lydia was having a lot of conversations and hoped that Vakama was sticking with the plan, but knew he had his idol if he felt concerned. At Mokuta, David approached Zach, Sharn, Lee, and Phoebe to try and blindside Nick as he was a huge strategic threat. During the immunity challenge, Moana and David did discuss working together behind the scenes after the merge and David wanted to keep Moana to keep Mat happy. However, Moana had her own plans and approached Sharn, Tarzan, Lee, and Jacqui with a plan to blindside Phoebe. Moana sought to weaken David's control in the tribe and believed that getting rid of his ally, Phoebe, would guarantee that result. Moana planned to have her allies split the vote between Nick and Phoebe to make it look like Moana was loyal to David. Meanwhile, Phoebe revealed that she didn't want to see Nick leave. Phoebe revealed to Nick about David's plan to blindside him and the two approached Sharn to vote Moana out because she had revealed herself to be taking control of the tribe and they wanted to break up the Moana/Tarzan/Jacqui alliance. Both tribes attended Tribal Council together at the same time. Before they voted, Jonathan revealed that the two people voted out of their tribes would compete in a fire making challenge to remain in the game. The winner would return to their tribe and the loser would be eliminated. Vakama stuck with its split vote plan and Lydia was voted out of the tribe. For Mokuta, the vote was undecided between Nick, Phoebe, and Moana. However, with four votes, Phoebe was voted out of Mokuta. Phoebe won the ensuing fire making challenge, sending Lydia out of the game.
135	9	"Episode 9"	Days 19—20	19 February 2020
On Vakama, while Mat was happy to see Lydia gone, he knew he and John were on the bottom of the tribe. Mat and John hoped to pull in Shonee and Harry to blindside Locky at the next Tribal Council. On Mokuta, Phoebe was happy to still be in the game, but knew she was on the bottom. She tried to smooth things over with David, who felt betrayed by Phoebe because she told Nick that he wanted to blindside him. Though David felt powerless for the first time in the game, Moana wanted to keep David in the game and hoped to eliminate Phoebe next so David had no other choice but to work with her. Despite this, neither David nor Moana completely trusted each other.: Survivor Auction: Each tribe received $2000. Players could bid on items, but would pay for them using the tribe's money and would not be allowed to share.; Phoebe won a seat at a private dining table, as well as all the items at the auction. She chose A.K. to join her. Nick won a video from home, while Mat, John, Lee, and Locky won food items. Back at Vakama, A.K. revealed to Locky, Brooke, and Flick that Phoebe told him about Mokuta's strategizing. A.K. revealed that Moana was running the game, prompting the alliance to want to get rid of Mat next so he can't reunite with his allies at the merge. Back at Mokuta, Moana believed that Phoebe's act of buying the private table showed her true colors and she believed she could easily get her out next. Moana still tried to convince David that she was looking out for his best interests, but David was still wary of Moana. To gain some power back, David searched for an idol, finding it in a tree.: Immunity Challenge: In pairs, using only their feet, the tribes attempted to hold up a disc tethered to a bucket of water. If they dropped too low, the bucket will drop and the pair will be out. The last pair standing won immunity for their tribe.; Mokuta won another immunity challenge. Back at Vakama, the majority six planned to split their votes between Mat and John. Mat attempted to convince Shonee and Harry to join with him and John to get rid of Locky, warning them that not making the move this night would cause them to be at the bottom of the tribe next. Mat also attempted to convince Flick to join him as he believed she was on the bottom of the four-person alliance with Locky, A.K., and Brooke. Harry and Shonee contemplated whether it was the right time to make this move or whether it was too soon to make such a huge move against Locky. At Tribal Council, the tribe discussed their past two Tribal Councils, and Harry explicitly stated there was a hierarchy on Vakama. John called out Locky and Brooke as the leaders of the majority and asked tribemates to make a move or the opportunity wouldn't be available after this. After the votes were cast, Mat played his idol, negating three votes against him. However, Shonee and Harry, as well as Flick, stuck with the majority alliance's split-vote plan, eliminating John from the game with three counted votes.
136	10	"Episode 10"	Days 21—22	24 February 2020
On Vakama, Shonee and Harry decided to align with Locky, Brooke, A.K., and Flick, leaving Mat at the bottom on the tribe. Mat, refusing to go down without a fight, approached Locky and Harry to discuss the fact that once he was eliminated, the alliance would have to cut one of their own and to think about their positions. On Mokuta, Phoebe knew she was still on the bottom after the double Tribal Council. She tried to rebuild trust with David, who lost trust in her once she revealed their voting plans to Nick. David trusted Moana more and believed he established a good rapport with Zach.: Reward Challenge: One member from each tribe pulled themselves along a rope attached to two buoys. They then had five minutes to swim against the current from one buoy to another to get the tribe flag at the end without touching or interfering with their opponent. The first tribe to three points won a trip to the Survivor cake shop.; During one of the rounds, Locky got disqualified for grabbing onto Lee, ultimately leading to another win by Mokuta. The tribe discovered that the reward was "one at a time", realizing there would likely be an idol, clue, or advantage hidden at the site. The tribe allowed Tarzan to eat first and then drew straws to determine the order. While several people searched for any form of advantage, Phoebe discovered a clue which said the idol was hidden back at their camp in a termite mound.: Immunity Challenge: The tribes unpacked poles used to build a staircase. They raced up the staircase, over a tower, and then pushed a giant wooden cube to a series of posts to collect keys. One of the keys unlocked a chest of puzzle pieces, which two tribe members used to build a puzzle. The first tribe to complete the puzzle won immunity.; Mokuta won their fifth straight tribal challenge. Back at Vakama, the majority alliance was set on getting rid of Mat. In order to further establish trust and to further infiltrate the Vakama alliance, Harry offered a plan to the majority alliance where they would split the votes between Mat and himself. Harry was aware that this is a huge risk because, if Mat found an idol, he'd be voted out, but he was willing to take the risk to further advance himself in the game and make big moves later. In an attempt to save himself, Mat argued for the tribe to vote Shonee out as the physically weakest and strongest social player in the game. Mat also began to plant doubts in tribe members' heads about where they would stand if he was voted out of the tribe and only the six remaining alliance members were left. Flick indeed worried about her position on Vakama and debated whether it was the right time to make a big move. The rest of the tribe saw Flick talking to Mat and became concerned about whether Flick was paranoid with her position in the tribe. Brooke recalled that Flick blindsided her in their previous season so she was cautious about where Flick stood with the tribe. At Tribal Council, the tribe discussed their frequent challenge losses. Mat proposed to the tribe that keeping him would benefit the tribe physically in challenges and he pledged his loyalty to Vakama if they kept him for the merge. Many tribe members discussed the pros and cons that Mat brought to the game and the tribe. Ultimately, the tribe stuck with their plan of splitting the vote, and Mat, who did not find a new idol, was voted out.
137	11	"Episode 11"	Days 23—24	25 February 2020
After successfully voting Mat out of Vakama, Harry discussed future game plans with A.K., feeling concerned that he may be on the bottom of the tribe. Harry recognized A.K. as a strategic threat, but hoped to stay aligned with him moving forward. On Mokuta, Phoebe continued her idol search, still being on the bottom. Phoebe shared her idol clue with David as a sign of trust, but David, in disbelief that Phoebe still trusted him, plotted to find the idol for himself.: Reward Challenge: One member from each tribe faced off in a tug-of-war while tethered to a rope over a pool with the goal being to pull their opponent into the water. The first tribe to three points won a personalized packed lunch from home.; Vakama won the challenge, finally ending their losing streak. Back at Mokuta, Phoebe hoped to find the idol and blindside Moana, knowing the latter was in control and playing an under-the-radar game with a loyal alliance. After leading Phoebe away from camp, David went back to a termite mound closer to the camp and found his second idol of the season.: Immunity Challenge: In pairs, with arms outstretched, tribe members supported each other over a mud pit. As their bodies tire, they'd fall into the mud pit, eliminating them from the challenge. The last pair standing won immunity for their tribe.; Vakama won the challenge. Back at camp, Moana set her plan in motion to get rid of Phoebe as a strategic threat. Moana tried to get Jacqui, Tarzan, and Zach in on the plan. Phoebe, meanwhile, pitched her case to Nick, Sharn, Lee, Zach, and David, targeting Moana. Lee believed that keeping Phoebe would allow her to use her connections on Vakama to advance him, Nick, and Sharn. Meanwhile, David was still set on blindsiding Phoebe and tried to convince Sharn to join him on the plan, believing that himself, Sharn, and Moana would make a strong trio. Sharn and Zach both found themselves in the middle as swing votes, though Sharn was concerned over burning bridges with Lee and Nick. In order to stack the odds in his alliance's favor, Nick contemplated using his extra vote against Moana. At Tribal Council, Moana and Phoebe exchanged words regarding the other's approach to the game and the rivalry between the two of them was discussed among the tribe. David revealed one of his idols and stated he would play it to protect himself. Ultimately, Zach sided with Moana, Nick used his extra vote to cast two ballots against Moana, and Sharn, feeling thrown off by David pulling out an idol, voted against Moana as well. David did not play his idol, and a 5-5 tie between Phoebe and Moana ensued. As the tribe re-voted, Nick and Phoebe asked David to not vote Phoebe out. In the end, David stuck with his blindside and Sharn switched her vote, sending Phoebe out of the game.
138	12	"Episode 12"	Days 25—26	26 February 2020
At Mokuta, David was happy to have finally eliminated Phoebe, but he and Moana were upset that Sharn voted for Moana. Sharn attempted to smooth things over with the two, believing that they could be a strong trio moving forward. Sharn revealed that she only voted for Moana because she didn't want Nick and Lee to know she was working with her. Despite this, Moana felt solid with her position in the tribe. Nick was upset that he wasted his extra vote and knew he was now on the bottom with Lee and Sharn. David wanted to get rid of Nick next, perceiving him to be a large strategic threat, but wondered if he could trust Sharn and debated possibly cutting her next. At Vakama, the six remaining players were seemingly a solid alliance without cracks. However, Brooke contemplated blindsiding Flick, who previously flipped on her in their season. While walking in the woods, Harry spotted a yellow rope on the ground and discovered a secret advantage attached. The advantage gave him the power to stop the votes from being read at one of the next two Tribal Councils, meaning that the votes would remain a mystery and nobody would be eliminated. Harry was thrilled to have this power and hoped to use it to start making crucial moves and reclaim the "Dirty Harry" persona.: Immunity Challenge: The tribes completed an obstacle course: digging under a log and going under it, racing over obstacles, and through a rope tunnel. They then used a giant slingshot to shoot coconuts at targets. The first tribe to hit all five targets won immunity.; Mokuta narrowly won immunity. Back at Vakama, the remaining six players dreaded the thought of voting out a fellow ally. Flick proposed that the original Vakama members of herself, Locky, Brooke, and A.K. voted Harry out of the game. While Brooke agreed that Harry was a very sneaky player and didn't know if she could trust him, she also proposed to the others that it might be a good time to blindside Flick, secretly wanting revenge. In order to keep his options open, A.K. revealed to Shonee that Harry's name had been proposed in order to build trust with her. Shonee informed Harry that the tribe had discussed voting him out, which made Harry consider using his advantage tonight just to give himself a few more days in the game. At Tribal Council, Harry and Shonee discussed the fact that they came into the Vakama alliance later than the other four. The tribe also discussed that sticking with old allies might not be the best path moving forward. After the votes are cast, Harry stood up and stated his intention to use an advantage. However, A.K. whispered to him that they voted for Flick, asking him to trust the others and they could go to the merge five strong with Harry's advantage. Harry decided to trust his tribe by not playing the advantage. Indeed, Harry's gamble paid off as Brooke convinced her fellow Vakama members to blindside Flick out of the game.
139	13	"Episode 13"	Days 27—28	2 March 2020
While Brooke celebrated getting revenge on Flick, the rest of Vakama worried about Harry's advantage. He kept it secret from all of his tribemates except Shonee, and they considered using it to save Nick on Mokuta, as the upcoming Tribal Council was the last opportunity to use it. At Mokuta, Nick hoped to survive the next vote and bring Sharn and Lee into his alliance with Shonee and Harry at the merge. David still sought to eliminate Nick, knowing he had friends on Vakama, though he attempted to lull Nick into a false sense of security.: Reward Challenge: The tribes climbed over a wall, then shuffled up a pole to a tower. They jumped off the tower, swam to a deck, unhooked a pontoon of puzzle pieces, pulled them back, and assembled a stacked puzzle. The first tribe to complete the puzzle won BLTs and Bloody Marys.; Mokuta won the challenge, and Jonathan told them to pick two Vakama members to join them. They selected Brooke and Shonee. While at Mokuta, Brooke and Shonee gathered that Moana was in charge and there were a few cracks in the tribe. Nick tried to subtly let Shonee know he was in danger, but was consistently watched by the other Mokuta members. Back at Vakama, Brooke and Shonee told the men that Nick was clearly on the bottom, which made Harry lean towards giving Nick his advantage since Nick had connections to help them both advance. However, Harry was also concerned about playing the advantage as it could put him and the rest of Vakama in danger in the next round of the game.: Immunity Challenge: Each person held a rope to balance a wobbly table. They had to collect wooden blocks one at a time to stack them on top of the others. If at any time a tribe's table drops their stack, they'd have to start over. The first tribe to stack all their blocks and get back behind the line won immunity.; Vakama won immunity. After the challenge, Harry revealed his advantage to the rest of the tribe and debated giving it to Nick. Locky told Harry to not use it and the five of them should just go in strong together. Harry ultimately decided not to give Nick the advantage. Back at Mokuta, David and Moana hoped the tribe would unanimously vote Nick out to keep the tribe unified going into the merge. David told Sharn that this was her last chance to prove her trust in the game and Sharn struggled over whether she could vote for Nick, having bonded with him on a personal level. To mislead Nick, David told him that Jacqui would go home, but Nick saw through the facade. Nick hatched a plot to split the votes between David and Zach in order to flush David's idol and send Zach home, discussing this with Lee, Sharn, Jacqui, and Tarzan with the hopes of weakening David's control on the tribe. At Tribal Council, the tribe discussed David's idol, while Nick revealed that he played the extra vote and that he was on the bottom. However, the members of Mokuta stated they were all loyal and wanted to remain unified going into the merge. Further, David cautioned anyone about making a big move tonight as going into the merge as a split tribe would leave them vulnerable. In the end, Mokuta stayed unified to send Nick home unanimously.
140	14	"Episode 14"	Days 29—30	3 March 2020
At Mokuta, Sharn was sad to vote Nick out, but knew it would improve her relationships with David and Moana. David, feeling powerful due to his links to old Vakama and his two idols, proposed a plan to the rest of Mokuta that they should act like he's on the bottom, which would allow him and Zach to infiltrate Vakama and take them out from the inside. Mokuta and Vakama both arrived at a challenge site and were informed by Jonathan that they are now merged. They named their new tribe, Kalokalo.: Reward Challenge: Each person held onto a clay pot tethered to a beam. If they let the pot go, it would smash onto a rail, and that castaway would be eliminated. The last person left holding a pot won an advantage at the first individual immunity challenge.; During the challenge, David whispered to AK, Brooke, and Harry that he was on the bottom and hoped to reunite with Vakama. Lee won the challenge. Back at camp, the players enjoyed the merge feast, while AK, Tarzan, and Moana celebrated making the merge for the first time. Moana was determined to keep Mokuta strong and hoped to get revenge for Mat by voting Locky out first, perceiving him as the leader of the Vakama group. Mokuta continued to give the impression that David was on the bottom, while Shonee tried to flip Zach due to competing with him in a prior season and being exiled with him earlier. Meanwhile, David talked with Locky about reuniting Vakama, plus Zach, and getting rid of a threat in Sharn. This made Locky feel secure despite being in the minority.: Immunity Challenge: The contestants balanced on a seesaw and stack blocks in a bowl from one side to the other. If they dropped the blocks, they would have to start over. The first to stack all nine blocks won immunity.; Lee's advantage made him have to stack eight blocks instead of nine, but Shonee's great balancing skills gave her an easy victory. Back at camp, the old Vakama members believed Zach and David joined their side, while Moana believed that Mokuta would stay strong to vote out Locky. Mokuta agreed on telling Sharn to inform AK that he was the target to throw off Vakama and make them paranoid if they have an idol. David and Zach recognized they were the swing votes, but the Mokuta alliance (particularly Tarzan) grew concerned about David's true loyalties. At Tribal Council, the merged tribe discussed how the merge has changed the game, whether the tribal lines will stick, and whether tonight is the right night for a big move. Locky and Moana bantered back and forth about the other's approach to the game. Ultimately, Mokuta stuck together, making Locky the first member of the jury.
141	15	"Episode 15"	Days 31—32	4 March 2020
Despite feeling sick from the beach conditions after the last 30 days, David believes he is in a great position. David intends to vote Harry out next as Harry is the last remaining player in the game who blindsided him in Season 4 and to overtake Harry's record for the most days played on Survivor. Meanwhile, Moana celebrated the solid execution of Locky's blindside and getting revenge for Mat. Moana is convinced that she is solid with her new core alliance of David and Sharn. The Vakama alliance, particularly Brooke, were devastated by Locky's blindside, with the four remaining players knowing they were betrayed by David and Zach and they are on the bottom. Harry knows that if he wants to survive, he'll have to find a way to break Mokuta. Harry believes David is untouchable as a player, so he hatches a plan to try and get rid of Jacqui in order to weaken the Mokuta alliance and potentially open up a plan to destroy the alliance from within. Harry approaches both Zach, who has impressed Harry with his gameplay, and Lee with the plan to flip over to Vakama just for this next vote.: Immunity Challenge: An adaptation of the Final Immunity Challenge from Champions V Contenders (2019); the contestants stood on narrow pedestals while holding onto ropes attached to two heavy sandbags. At regular intervals, castaways must move to wider pedestals. If they release their sandbags or take a foot off their pedestals, they would be out. The last person remaining won immunity.; Despite lasting almost 7 hours last season, Harry made it only an hour and a half before losing out to Lee and the eventual winner, Brooke. As the immunity challenge entered the night of Tribal Council, the Kalokalo tribe had to convene outside of Tribal Council to form a plan for the vote. David and the Mokuta Seven solidified a split vote between Harry and A.K. in case Harry had an idol. Harry and the remaining Vakama alliance continued to try and swing Zach and Lee over against Jacqui. Lee considers voting for Jacqui because he recalls losing Season 1 because he tried to go with the flow and didn't make any moves of his own. Zach also considers it because he also wants to make moves and he believes he might be able to attain more power if Mokuta is more fractured as an alliance. At Tribal Council, Harry made his intentions clear that it was still Mokuta versus Vakama with two players holding the power tonight to change things up. The Vakama members also try to persuade the Mokuta members that the time to make a move in the game is gradually going away the farther the game goes. While David and Moana discuss sticking solid as an alliance, other members do ponder the fact that moves have to be made in the game in order to establish your resume at the end. After the votes, Harry playfully disrupted the Tribal with his secret banana stash before the votes were revealed. The Mokuta Seven managed to stick together and sent Harry to the jury as a united force.
142	16	"Episode 16"	Days 33—34	9 March 2020
As the last original member of the Little Rascals alliance, Shonee had to continue working her social game around Kalokalo, learning that she was born in the same area where Tarzan comes from.: Reward Challenge: Divided into two teams of five, each team selected 1 member to slide down into a water pit to fight for a ball to shoot into a basket net suspended over the pit. The first team to score five points won an Australian Barbeque.; Brooke, David, Moana, Sharn, and Zach dominated the challenge. Accompanying the barbeque were surprise letters from home for the castaways to bond with each other. However, the mood at camp turned for the worst after the reward challenge loss when Lee was called aside by the producers. Informed that his mother was in critical condition after having suffered a massive stroke, Lee chose to withdraw from the game immediately with Tarzan and the rest of the tribe's support to return to Australia to be with his family. (Lee could not make it back to Australia in time before his mother died.): Immunity Challenge: The tribe had to trend water off shore while holding up an overhead metal chute and ball with one hand. The last tribe member to have their ball remain in their chute won immunity.; The tribe's morale after Lee's departure was at an all time low when they arrived at the challenge. The challenge proved difficult for everyone until Shonee pulled off another impressive win over David after 2 hours and 5 minutes. With their alliance down 3 to 6, Shonee's immunity win put A.K. and Brooke at risk. Lee's departure sadly hampered the Mokuta majority, forcing them to consider a three-way split vote to get rid of Brooke. The Vakama trio tried to pull Sharn in to flip on the majority, to no avail. Tribal Council began with A.K. and Brooke pointing out their struggles in finding cracks in the majority alliance. However, before the vote, Jonathan revealed that Exile Beach was returning for the merge. This time, Kalokalo would have to vote out three people to be exiled, with another three joining Exile after the next Tribal Council, before all six of them fight to return to the game. With this twist in play, both alliances stuck with their plans, with the Mokuta majority sending A.K. and Brooke to Exile Beach, with the Vakama minority blindsiding Moana and sent her to Exile Beach as well.
143	17	"Episode 17"	Days 35—36	10 March 2020
A frustrated Moana had to rebuild after being dragged to Exile Beach along with A.K. and Brooke, while Shonee found herself on her own against the Mokuta majority. Stunned at the thought of returning to Exile Beach this season, she continued to further her social connections in the Kalokalo tribe. David, being aware of Shonee's social prowess, felt adamant in sending her back to Exile, all while avoiding the likelihood of joining her with using his poor health as a crutch in potential challenges.: Immunity Challenge: Holding onto a long pole, each tribe member carried three balls to balance on grooves on a wobbly board attached to the end. If any of their balls fall off the board, they restarted. The first tribe member to successfully balance all 3 balls on their board and return to the start of their pole won immunity.; After her immunity win, Sharn started to gather Tarzan and Jacqui to potentially send David to Exile Beach over Jacqui. As the majority already decided that Shonee would go to Exile, Sharn felt that David would be a bigger shot to take by blindsiding him instead of sending Jacqui. David worked on convincing Zach to volunteer for Exile as a physical threat to the Vakama minority. However, Tarzan informed the supermodel about Sharn's plot, to his chagrin. When the tribe arrived at Tribal Council for the second Exile vote, Jonathan informed Kalokalo that the exiled would compete in two challenges, with the 3 remaining exiled facing a vote to remain in the game. With that in mind, Sharn backed down from voting David, which caused a tie vote between him and Zach. The revote sent Zach to Exile Beach alongside Jacqui and the prepared Shonee.
144	18	"Episode 18"	Days 37—38	11 March 2020
A.K. didn't believe Zach's story of volunteering for Exile, acknowledging it was probably David's manipulation at work. Jacqui was despondent by her alliance sending her to Exile Beach; she noticed that Zach's been groomed for David's endgame over other players, and that she needed to use her time on Exile to turn people against David. Shonee targeted Jacqui's frustrations to work her social game. Kalokalo enjoyed a peaceful morning with just the 3 remaining players. Sharn felt she had to keep David in the game, but the information Tarzan brought to David the previous day made David's trust with Sharn falter, and the threat of the exiled players bonding loomed over his game.: Exile Challenge: While behind a large wooden structure, the exiled tribe members untied a bag of supplies and built a rod long enough to reach flint on the other side of the structure. Once they have retrieved their flint, they ran to their fire-making station to build a fire. The first two exiled tribe members to successfully build a fire and cut through a rope returned to Kalokalo and were immune from the next Tribal Council.; During the challenge, the Kalokalo players watching the challenge started rooting for Moana and Zach to win, further alienating Jacqui. Eventually Moana breezed through the fire-building to return to the game, with Brooke snatching a win from under Zach's nose. Zach was disappointed with losing the challenge, but remained motivated to win his way back into Kalokalo for his resumé. Shonee continued working on Jacqui as herself and A.K. remained on Exile as the minority alliance, highlighting David and Sharn's cheering at the challenge that Jacqui was low in the Mokuta alliance and trying to assure her she wouldn't be on the bottom of their alliance.: Exile Challenge: The exiled tribe members kept weighted sandbags above ground by holding onto a rope. If their sandbags fell below a painted mark on the hanging structure, they were out of the challenge. The last exiled tribe member still holding up their sandbags returned to Kalokalo and were immune from the Tribal Council vote.; Jacqui and Zach started to bicker as they outlasted A.K. and Shonee in the challenge. Eventually Zach dropped out of the challenge despite vocal support from David, leading to Jacqui returning to Kalokalo properly. The exiled tribe members all returned to camp to join in the strategic talk before Tribal Council. David advocated for another three-way split to protect Zach, so that Brooke had to flip on Shonee and send her to the jury. Jacqui however, wanted to target Zach to weaken David's grip on the Mokuta alliance. Shonee's work on exile Beach and her confidence after her challenge win led to Jacqui approaching Moana about blindsiding Zach, to avoid burning bridges. Moana agreed with Jacqui's plan, and roped in Sharn. At Tribal Council, the men of Mokuta felt adamant that A.K. and Shonee would be targeted, while Moana and Sharn let Jacqui flip to hide their involvement in weakening David's control. With Jacqui's flip, Zach was blindsided and joined the jury, also to David's shock.
145	19	"Episode 19"	Days 39—40	16 March 2020
Jacqui's blindside of Zach left David feeling vulnerable and reconnecting with Tarzan as a potential shield. The blindside left the Vakama minority and Moana feeling more comfortable in exploiting Jacqui's confidence and David's vulnerability to their advantage, respectively.: Reward Challenge: Each tribe member held a steel bar above a tile using two handles for as long as possible. If they dropped their steel bar, it smashed their tile, eliminating them. The last tribe member standing won an overnight stay at a luxury rainforest retreat with a warm breakfast the morning after.; David finally outlasted Shonee in a challenge, after a length of playful negotiations between the two of them and an unexpected slip-up by Shonee. With his win, he elected to bring his allies Moana, Sharn, and Tarzan to accompany him on the reward. His choices ruffled a few feathers, solidifying a 4-4 split in the tribe. He rationalized that Sharn's blindside chatter was more threatening than Jacqui already flipping on him, so he chose to use the reward to regroup the Mokuta alliance.: Immunity Challenge: A three stage knockout course; the first stage had the tribe navigating over and under obstacles while attached to a rope. The first five to reach the finish proceeded to stage two. The second stage consisted of building a pole to balance a ball, then maneuvering across a knee height ladder frame. The first three to place their ball into a high rise gutter and into their bucket were in final stage, where they had to solve a puzzle. The first tribe member to complete their puzzle won immunity.; During the challenge, Shonee let Moana and Sharn in on the plan to vote out David, but his immunity win derailed their efforts. David felt relieved having the necklace, so that he didn't have to use his either of his two idols. The Mokuta alliance set their sights on blindsiding Jacqui; they tried to reconnect with her to keep her guard down with a decoy plan against Shonee. The Vakama minority pulled Jacqui in to take out Moana as the strongest threat besides David. Realizing that the vote might lead to a rock draw, A.K. tried to convince Sharn that voting Moana would be in her best interest, as the Vakama minority were willing to go to a rock draw. At Tribal Council, the new alliance lines were drawn with Jacqui joining the Vakama minority in forcing a draw. David surprised the tribe by using an idol on Tarzan before the first vote was revealed. During the revote, Sharn tried to get Tarzan to flip and vote Moana to avoid rocks, but the revote ended up in a deadlock. The Vakama minority were adamant in going to rocks, but knowing that Tarzan was also safe from the rock draw, Sharn urged A.K. that risking rocks for Jacqui would be a mistake in the Vakama minority's game. She offered to flip on the Mokuta alliance to avoid the rock draw. Eventually A.K. stepped down and let Jacqui be sent to the jury over Moana.
146	20	"Episode 20"	Days 41—42	17 March 2020
Sometimes the swing vote in Survivor is the most powerful position to be in. During Tribal Council, one tribe member is implored for their vote by both sides, giving them the power of the game.
147	21	"Episode 21"	Days 43—44	18 March 2020
After missing out on the immunity challenge win, a hunt for an idol ensues and as always with Tribal Council, not all is as it seems and Jonathan has one last trick up his sleeve.
148	22	"Episode 22"	Days 45—46	23 March 2020
With one tribe member on the bottom of the group, they know the only way to secure their place in the game is to win individual immunity.
149	23	"Episode 23"	Days 47	24 March 2020
With the next immunity challenge deciding who will make the final three, it's more important than ever to be on your game, but for one castaway, island life is taking a toll on their body.
150	24	"Episode 24"	Days 48—50	30 March 2020
The Grand Finale where a Sole Survivor All Star is crowned after 50 days of competing in Fiji.

== Voting history ==
Tribal Phase (Days 1–28)

	Original tribes						Switched tribes									
Episode #	1	2	3	4	5	6 (Note: Mokuta were informed at Tribal Council that they were voting to exile the two tribe members who received the most votes. Shonee and Zach received the highest number of votes and were exiled until the tribe swap.)	7	8 (Note: Both Mokuta and Vakama attended Tribal Council on Day 18. The person voted out of each tribe would compete against each other in a firemaking duel. The winner returned to their tribe and remained in the game, while the loser was eliminated. Lydia and Phoebe were voted out. Phoebe won the fire making challenge and returned to Mokuta, eliminating Lydia.)			9	10	11		12	13
Day #	2	5	7	9	12	14	16	18			20	22	24		26	28
Eliminated	Shane	Jericho	Daisy	Michelle	Henry	Shonee & Zach	Abbey	Lydia	Phoebe	Lydia	John	Mat	Tie (Note: The Tribal Council vote resulted in a tie. Per the rules, a second vote was held where the castaways involved in the tie would not vote and the remaining castaways could only vote for those who tied.)	Phoebe	Flick	Nick
Votes	8–3–1	7–5	4–2–0 (Note: Mat played a hidden immunity idol on Jacqui (the one given to him by Henry at the immunity challenge), therefore five votes against her were negated; Brooke played a hidden immunity idol on David, however there were no votes against him.)	6–3–2	5–0 (Note: Shonee played a hidden immunity idol on herself, therefore five votes against her were negated.)	5–3–1	5–2–2–1	5–4	4–3–2	Challenge	3–2–0 (Note: Mat played a hidden immunity idol on himself, therefore three votes against him were negated.)	4–2–1	5–5	5–2	5–1	7–1
Voter	Vote															
David		Jericho	Moana						Nick				Phoebe	Phoebe		Nick
Sharn	Harry			Henry	Henry	Zach			Phoebe				Moana	Phoebe		Nick
Moana		Daisy	Daisy						Phoebe				Phoebe	None (Note: Moana and Phoebe were not eligible to vote in the revote.)		Nick
Brooke		Jericho	~~Jacqui~~				Abbey	John			John	Harry			Flick	
Tarzan		Daisy	Daisy						Nick				Phoebe	Phoebe		Nick
A.K.		Jericho	~~Jacqui~~				Abbey	Lydia			~~Mat~~	Mat			Flick	
Shonee	Shane			Henry	Henry	Zach	Abbey	John			John	Mat			Flick	
Jacqui		Daisy	Daisy						Phoebe				Phoebe	Phoebe		Nick
Zach	Shane			Michelle	~~Shonee~~	John			Nick				Phoebe	Phoebe		Nick
Lee	Michelle			Michelle	~~Shonee~~	Shonee			Phoebe				Moana	Moana		Nick
Harry	Shane			Michelle	Henry	Shonee	Lydia	Lydia			~~Mat~~	Mat			Flick	
Locky		Jericho	~~Jacqui~~				Abbey	Lydia			~~Mat~~	Harry			Flick	
Nick	Shane			Michelle	Henry	Zach			Moana				Moana (2 x) (Note: Nick played an extra vote advantage, allowing him to cast two votes during a single vote. This advantage did not carry over to the re-vote.)	Moana		Zach
Flick		Jericho	~~Jacqui~~				Abbey	John			John	Mat			Shonee	
Phoebe		Jericho	Moana						Moana	Won			Moana	None		
Mat		Daisy	Daisy				Lydia	Lydia			Locky	Shonee				
John	Shane			Henry	~~Shonee~~	Shonee	Mat	Lydia			Locky					
Lydia	Shane			Michelle	~~Shonee~~	Shonee	Shonee	John		Lost						
Abbey	Shane			Michelle	Henry	Shonee	Shonee									
Henry	Harry			Sharn	~~Shonee~~											
Michelle	Shane			Sharn												
Daisy		Jericho	~~Jacqui~~													
Jericho		Daisy														
Shane	Harry															

Individual phase (Day 29–50)

	Merged tribe			Exile Twist (Note: On Days 34 and 36, instead of voting a castaway out of the game, the Kalokalo tribe voted to send castaways into exile. The 3 players with the most votes at each Tribal Council were exiled. Of the 6 people exiled, one would officially be eliminated from the game. On Day 34, A.K., Brooke, & Moana were exiled. On Day 36, Jacqui, Shonee, & Zach were exiled.) (Note: On Day 37 & 38, the 6 Exiled castaways competed in a series of challenges to earn their safety and be allowed to return to the Kalokalo tribe. After the Exile Challenges, Brooke, Jacqui, and Moana rejoined Kalokalo, leaving A.K., Shonee, and Zach eligible for elimination in a special Tribal Council vote. One would be voted off, while the remaining two would rejoin Kalokalo.)				Merged tribe								
Episode #	14	15	16		17		18	19			20	21 (Note: On Day 44, after the players cast their votes, Jonathan offered the Final 6 players to not reveal the votes, should a player accept a "Trial By Fire" to stay in the game - losing would eliminate the participating player. Upon accepting the trial, the other 5 players had to unanimously choose a challenger for the player participating in the "Trial By Fire" - who would not be at risk of elimination. AK accepted the offer, and the tribe chose Moana as his challenger. AK lost his trial and was eliminated.)		22	23	24
Day #	30	32	33	34	36		38	40			42	44		46	47	49
Eliminated	Locky	Harry	Lee	A.K., Brooke & Moana	Jacqui & Shonee	Zach (Note: The Kalokalo tribe tied for the third person to be exiled on Day 36. David and Zach could not partake in the revote, nor could the already Exiled Jacqui and Shonee.)	Zach	Tie	Tie (Note: After two rounds of voting, Tribal Council remained tied. Per the rules, the non-tied castaways must come to a Consensus as to whom to eliminate between the tied castaways, or else one of the non-immune deliberating castaways would be eliminated by random draw.)	Jacqui	Shonee	~~A.K.~~	A.K.	Tarzan	Brooke	Moana
Vote	7–5	5–4–2	Withdrew (Note: No vote, Lee withdrew from the game due to a family emergency. He did not serve as a member of the jury.)	3–3–3	2–2–1–1	2–0	4–3–2	4–4	3–3	Consensus (Note: Due to a deadlocked tie, the non-tied castaways had to come to a consensus decision to eliminate either Jacqui or Moana, or else A.K., Brooke, Sharn, and Shonee would participate in a rock draw. As David won the Immunity challenge he would be immune from a rock draw as would Tarzan, after David used an Immunity idol to save him. The non-tied castaways eliminated Jacqui.)	4–3	~~4–2~~	Trial By Fire	3–1–0 (Note: David played a hidden immunity idol on himself, therefore one vote against him was negated.)	3–1	1–0
Voter	Vote															
David	Locky	Harry		A.K.	Zach	None (Note: David and Zach were not eligible to vote in the revote.)	Shonee	Jacqui	Jacqui		Shonee	~~A.K.~~		Tarzan	Brooke	Moana
Sharn	Locky	A.K.		Brooke	Jacqui	Zach	A.K.	Jacqui	Jacqui		Shonee	~~A.K.~~		Tarzan	Brooke	None (Note: This contestant was only able to vote for one other contestant, thus they were not eligible to vote.)
Moana	Locky	Harry		Brooke	Exiled		A.K.	Jacqui	None (Note: Jacqui and Moana were not eligible to vote in the revote.)		Shonee	~~A.K.~~		Tarzan	Brooke	None
Brooke	Sharn	Jacqui		Moana	Exiled		Zach	Moana	Moana		David	~~Sharn~~		~~David~~	Sharn	
Tarzan	Locky	Harry		A.K.	Shonee	Zach	Shonee	Jacqui	Jacqui		Shonee	~~A.K.~~		Sharn		
A.K.	Sharn	Jacqui		Moana	Exiled		Zach	Moana	Moana		David	~~Sharn~~	Lost Trial			
Shonee	Sharn	Jacqui		Moana	Jacqui	Exiled	Zach	Moana	Moana		David					
Jacqui	Locky	Harry		Brooke	Shonee	Exiled	Zach	Moana	None							
Zach	Locky	Harry		A.K.	David	None	Shonee									
Lee	Locky	A.K.														
Harry	Sharn	Jacqui														
Locky	Sharn															

Final vote
Episode #	24	
Day #	50	
Finalist	David	Sharn
Vote	8–1	
Juror	Vote	
Moana		Sharn
Brooke	David	
Tarzan	David	
A.K.	David	
Shonee	David	
Jacqui	David	
Zach	David	
Harry	David	
Locky	David	

== Reception ==
=== Ratings ===
Ratings data is from OzTAM and represents the viewership from the 5 largest Australian metropolitan centres (Sydney, Melbourne, Brisbane, Perth and Adelaide).

Wk	Ep	Air date	Timeslot	Overnight ratings		Consolidated ratings		Total ratings		Source
Wk	Ep	Air date	Timeslot	Viewers	Rank	Viewers	Rank	Viewers	Rank	Source
1	1	3 February 2020	Monday 7:30pm	624,000	10	92,000	3	715,000	8	
1	2	4 February 2020	Tuesday 7:30pm	562,000	9	96,000	3	658,000	9	
1	3	5 February 2020	Wednesday 7:30pm	551,000	10	112,000	4	663,000	9	
2	4	10 February 2020	Monday 7:30pm	605,000	10	83,000	3	687,000	8	
2	5	11 February 2020	Tuesday 7:30pm	612,000	10	82,000	3	693,000	8	
2	6	12 February 2020	Wednesday 7:30pm	572,000	11	128,000	2	700,000	7	
3	7	17 February 2020	Monday 7:30pm	613,000	12	69,000	3	682,000	11	
3	8	18 February 2020	Tuesday 7:30pm	630,000	8	67,000	4	697,000	7	
3	9	19 February 2020	Wednesday 7:30pm	584,000	11	114,000	4	698,000	6	
4	10	24 February 2020	Monday 7:30pm	647,000	11	60,000	5	707,000	10	
4	11	25 February 2020	Tuesday 7:30pm	584,000	9	77,000	4	661,000	9	
4	12	26 February 2020	Wednesday 7:30pm	563,000	12	114,000	3	677,000	9	
5	13	2 March 2020	Monday 7:30pm	611,000	9	70,000	4	680,000	8	
5	14	3 March 2020	Tuesday 7:30pm	663,000	8	67,000	4	730,000	7	
5	15	4 March 2020	Wednesday 7:30pm	548,000	12	97,000	4	644,000	11	
6	16	9 March 2020	Monday 7:30pm	701,000	8	67,000	4	768,000	7	
6	17	10 March 2020	Tuesday 7:30pm	611,000	8	76,000	4	691,000	7	
6	18	11 March 2020	Wednesday 7:30pm	599,000	8	116,000	4	714,000	7	
7	19	16 March 2020	Monday 7:30pm	700,000	10	70,000	3	770,000	9	
7	20	17 March 2020	Tuesday 7:30pm	728,000	9	61,000	4	789,000	10	
7	21	18 March 2020	Wednesday 7:30pm	714,000	11	88,000	4	803,000	11	
8	22	23 March 2020	Monday 7:30pm	736,000	9	46,000	4	782,000	10	
8	23	24 March 2020	Tuesday 7:30pm	779,000	10	50,000	3	822,000	10	
9	24 (Note: The final episode was coded into two programs - the first titled "Grand Finale" and the second titled "Winner Announced". Because of this, two separate sets of ratings were produced.)	30 March 2020	Monday 7:30pm	878,000	9	32,000	6	908,000	9	
9	24	30 March 2020	Monday 7:30pm	984,000	7	50,000	4	1,034,000	6	
9	R (Note: These ratings account for the "Reunion" special which aired after the finale.)	30 March 2020	Monday 9:15pm	625,000	17	53,000	3	677,000	14	
