= Susan Jones (swimmer) =

British swimmer

Personal information
- Born: 19 September 1954 (age 71)

Sport
- Sport: Swimming
- Club: Millfield School

Susan Jones (born 19 September 1954) is a British former swimmer.

Jones competed in the women's 800 metre freestyle at the 1972 Summer Olympics.
