= Antonella Valentini =

Italian swimmer

Personal information
- Born: 3 November 1958 (age 67) Rome, Italy

Sport
- Sport: Swimming

Antonella Valentini (born 3 November 1958) is an Italian former swimmer. She competed in the women's 800 metre freestyle at the 1972 Summer Olympics.
