= Swimming at the 1972 Summer Olympics – Women's 800 metre freestyle =

Women's 800 metre freestyle at the Games of the XX Olympiad
- Venue: Olympia Schwimmhalle
- Dates: 2 September 1972 (heats); 3 September 1972 (final)
- Competitors: 36 from 19 nations
- Winning time: 8:53.68 WR

Medalists
1st place, gold medalist(s)		Keena Rothhammer	United States
2nd place, silver medalist(s)		Shane Gould	Australia
3rd place, bronze medalist(s)		Novella Calligaris	Italy

The women's 800 metre freestyle event at the 1972 Olympic Games took place between September 2 and 3. This swimming event used freestyle swimming, which means that the method of the stroke is not regulated (unlike backstroke, breaststroke, and butterfly events). Nearly all swimmers use the front crawl or a variant of that stroke. Because an Olympic size swimming pool is 50 metres long, this race consisted of sixteen lengths of the pool.

== Results ==
=== Heats ===
Heat 1

Rank	Athlete	Country	Time	Notes
1	Novella Calligaris	Italy	9:02.96	
2	Andrea Eife	East Germany	9:22.88	
3	Barbara Schwarzfeldt	West Germany	9:24.89	
4	María Teresa Ramírez	Mexico	9:25.09	
5	Françoise Monod	Switzerland	9:50.73	
6	Hsu Yue-yun	Chinese Taipei	10:08.49	
7	Eleni Avlonitou	Greece	10:10.88	

Heat 2

Rank	Athlete	Country	Time	Notes
1	Keena Rothhammer	United States	8:59.69	
2	Hansje Bunschoten	Netherlands	9:21.13	
3	Uta Schütz	West Germany	9:22.93	
4	Olga de Angulo	Colombia	9:43.27	
5	Helga Wagner	West Germany	9:44.17	
6	Olga Petrusyova	Soviet Union	10:04.96	
7	Silvia Borgini	Argentina	10:09.19	

Heat 3

Rank	Athlete	Country	Time	Notes
1	Ann Simmons	United States	9:11.94	
2	Narelle Moras	Australia	9:17.95	
3	Roselina Angee	Colombia	9:38.08	
4	June Green	Great Britain	9:39.91	
5	Laura Vaca	Mexico	9:50.10	
6	Belinda Phillips	Jamaica	9:53.99	
7	Avis Willington	Great Britain	10:10.91	

Heat 4

Rank	Athlete	Country	Time	Notes
1	Shane Gould	Australia	9:10.84	
2	Gudrun Wegner	East Germany	9:11.32	
3	Karin Tülling	East Germany	9:25.73	
4	Federica Stabilini	Italy	9:27.84	
5	Mary Beth Rondeau	Canada	9:43.31	
6	Antonella Valentini	Italy	9:49.07	
7	Patricia López	Argentina	10:06.39	

Heat 5

Rank	Athlete	Country	Time	Notes
1	Jo Harshbarger	United States	9:14.46	
2	Karen Moras	Australia	9:25.11	
3	Jaynie Parkhouse	New Zealand	9:34.65	
4	Karen LeGresley	Canada	9:37.13	
5	Brenda Holmes	Canada	9:39.44	
6	Susan Jones	Great Britain	9:47.35	
7	Kirsten Knudsen	Denmark	10:02.56	
8	Aisling O'Leary	Ireland	10:18.05	

=== Final ===
Rank	Athlete	Country	Time	Notes
1	Keena Rothhammer	United States	8:53.68	WR
2	Shane Gould	Australia	8:56.39	
3	Novella Calligaris	Italy	8:57.46	
4	Ann Simmons	United States	8:57.62	
5	Gudrun Wegner	East Germany	8:58.89	
6	Jo Harshbarger	United States	9:01.21	
7	Hansje Bunschoten	Netherlands	9:16.69	
8	Narelle Moras	Australia	9:19.06	

Key: WR = World record
