= Olga Petrusyova =

Russian swimmer

Personal information
- Born: 22 April 1953 (age 73)

Sport
- Sport: Swimming

Olga Petrusyova (born 22 April 1953) is a Russian former swimmer. She competed in the women's 800 metre freestyle at the 1972 Summer Olympics the Soviet Union.
