= Ann Simmons =

American swimmer (born 1953)

Personal information
- Full name: Ann Linnaea Simmons (Married name: Baxter)
- Nickname: An
- National team: United States
- Born: March 10, 1953 (age 73) Santa Monica, California, U.S.
- Height: 5 ft 4 in (1.63 m)
- Weight: 126 lb (57 kg)

Sport
- Sport: Swimming
- Strokes: Freestyle
- Club: Lakewood Aquatic Club
- College team: University of California, Los Angeles
Medal record
Women's swimming
Representing the United States
Pan American Games
Gold medal – first place	1971 Cali	400 m freestyle
Summer Universiade
Gold medal – first place	1973 Moscow	400 m freestyle

Ann Linnaea Simmons (born March 10, 1953) is an American former competitive swimmer who represented the United States at the 1972 Summer Olympics in Munich, Germany. She competed in the women's 800-meter freestyle and finished fourth in the event final with a time of 8:57.62—a fraction of a second behind third-place Novella Calligaris of Italy.

In September of 1971 at a swim meet in Minsk, Belarus, Simmons set a world record in the 800 meter freestyle with a time of 8:59.4, becoming the first woman to ever break the 9-minute mark in the event.

Simmons graduated from Millikan High School in Long Beach, California. She attended Long Beach City College (LBCC) and the University of California, Los Angeles (UCLA). She swam for the LBCC and UCLA Bruins swimming and diving teams, and later coached the University of California, Irvine women's swimming team.

== See also ==
- List of University of California, Los Angeles people
- World record progression 800 metres freestyle
