= List of flag bearers for El Salvador at the Olympics =

El Salvador at the Olympics
- IOC code: ESA
- NOC: El Salvador Olympic Committee
- Website: www.teamesa.org (in Spanish)
- Medals: Gold 0 Silver 0 Bronze 0 Total 0

Summer appearances
- 1968; 1972; 1976–1980; 1984; 1988; 1992; 1996; 2000; 2004; 2008; 2012; 2016; 2020; 2024

This is a list of flag bearers who have represented El Salvador at the Olympics.

Flag bearers carry the national flag of their country at the opening ceremony of the Olympic Games.

#	Event year	Season	Flag bearer	Gender	Department	Sport
1	1968	Summer	Salvador Vilanova	Male	San Salvador	Swimming
2	1972	Summer	Salvador Vilanova	Male	San Salvador	Swimming
3	1984	Summer	Kriscia García	Female	—	Athletics
4	1988	Summer	Gustavo Manzur	Male	—	Wrestling
5	1992	Summer	María José Marenco	Female	—	Swimming
6	1996	Summer	Juan Vargas	Male	—	Judo
7	2000	Summer	Eva Dimas	Female	San Salvador	Weightlifting
8	2004	Summer	Evelyn García	Female	Santa Ana	Cycling
9	2008	Summer	Eva Dimas	Female	San Salvador	Weightlifting
10	2012	Summer	Evelyn García	Female	Santa Ana	Cycling
11	2016	Summer	Lilian Castro	Female	—	Shooting
12	2020	Summer	Enrique Arathoon	Male	—	Sailing
12	2020	Summer	Celina Márquez	Female	—	Swimming
13	2024	Summer	Uriel Canjura	Male	Cuscatlán	Badminton
13	2024	Summer	Celina Márquez	Female	—	Swimming

== See also ==
- El Salvador at the Olympics
