= El Salvador at the 2025 World Aquatics Championships =

- Flag of El Salvador
- World Aquatics code: ESA
- National federation: Federación Salvadoreña de Natación

in Singapore
- Competitors: 5 in 3 sports
- Medals: Gold 0 Silver 0 Bronze 0 Total 0

World Aquatics Championships appearances
- 1973; 1975; 1978; 1982; 1986; 1991; 1994; 1998; 2001; 2003; 2005; 2007; 2009; 2011; 2013; 2015; 2017; 2019; 2022; 2023; 2024; 2025

El Salvador is competing at the 2025 World Aquatics Championships in Singapore from 11 July to 3 August 2025.

== Competitors ==
The following is the list of competitors in the Championships.

Sport	Men	Women	Total
Artistic swimming	0	2	2
Open water swimming	0	1	1
Swimming	1	1	2
Total	1	4	5

== Artistic swimming ==
Women

Athlete	Event	Preliminary		Final	
Athlete	Event	Points	Rank	Points	Rank
Grecia Mendoza	Solo technical	186.8484	30	Did not advance	
Cesia Castaneda	Solo free	147.8300	24	Did not advance	
Cesia Castaneda; Grecia Mendoza	Duet technical	204.3550	32	Did not advance	
Cesia Castaneda; Grecia Mendoza	Duet free	139.7125	33	Did not advance	

== Open water swimming ==
Women

Athlete	Event	Final	
Athlete	Event	Time	Rank
Dayana Melendez	5 km	1:15:31.50	64
Dayana Melendez	10 km	DNF	

== Swimming ==
Men

Athlete	Event	Heat		Semifinal		Final	
Athlete	Event	Time	Rank	Time	Rank	Time	Rank
Xavier Ventura	400 m freestyle	4:07.60	41	—		Did not advance	
Xavier Ventura	200 m butterfly	2:02.86	30	Did not advance			

Women

Athlete	Event	Heat		Semifinal		Final	
Athlete	Event	Time	Rank	Time	Rank	Time	Rank
Marina Spadoni	50 m freestyle	25.74 NR	36	Did not advance			
Marina Spadoni	50 m butterfly	27.66	44	Did not advance			
