= El Salvador at the Olympics =

- IOC code: ESA
- NOC: El Salvador Olympic Committee
- Website: www.teamesa.org (in Spanish)
- Medals: Gold 0 Silver 0 Bronze 0 Total 0

Summer appearances
- 1968; 1972; 1976–1980; 1984; 1988; 1992; 1996; 2000; 2004; 2008; 2012; 2016; 2020; 2024; 2028

El Salvador first competed at the Summer Olympic Games in 1968 and has participated in every Summer Games since then, excluding those held in 1976 and 1980, when the nation joined the American-led boycott in protest of the Soviet invasion of Afghanistan. The nation has never participated in the Winter Olympic Games and has not earned a medal at any Games of the Olympiad, with its highest finish being 5th by track cyclist Maureen Kaila at the Women's Points Race event at the 1996 Summer Olympics.

Athletes from El Salvador have represented their nation in 13 sports. A total of 118 Salvadoran athletes have competed at the Olympic Games. Swimming (28 athletes) and athletics (27 athletes) have provided the most participants from El Salvador.

The Comité Olímpico de El Salvador was created in 1925 and recognized by the International Olympic Committee in 1938.

== Medal tables ==
=== Medals by Summer Games ===
Games	Athletes	Gold	Silver	Bronze	Total	Rank
1968 Mexico City	60	0	0	0	0	–
1972 Munich	11	0	0	0	0	–
1976 Montreal	did not participate					
1980 Moscow	boycotted					
1984 Los Angeles	10	0	0	0	0	–
1988 Seoul	6	0	0	0	0	–
1992 Barcelona	4	0	0	0	0	–
1996 Atlanta	8	0	0	0	0	–
2000 Sydney	8	0	0	0	0	–
2004 Athens	7	0	0	0	0	–
2008 Beijing	11	0	0	0	0	–
2012 London	10	0	0	0	0	–
2016 Rio de Janeiro	8	0	0	0	0	–
2020 Tokyo	5	0	0	0	0	–
2024 Paris	8	0	0	0	0	–
2028 Los Angeles	future event					
2032 Brisbane	future event					
Total		0	0	0	0	–

== Athletes by sport ==
=== Summer Olympics ===
Sport	1968	1972	1976	1980	1984	1988	1992	1996	2000	2004	2008	2012	2016	2020	2024	Total Athletes^{[a]}
Archery	–	–	–	–	–	–	–	–	1	1	–	–	–	–	1	3
Athletics	10	–	–	–	4	2	2	2	2	2	2	2	2	1	–	31
Badminton	–	–	–	–	–	–	–	–	–	–	–	–	–	–	1	1
Boxing	–	–	–	–	–	2	–	–	–	–	–	–	–	1	–	3
Cycling	5	–	–	–	–	–	–	1	1	1	2	1	–	–	–	11
Football	18	–	–	–	–	–	–	–	–	–	–	–	–	–	–	18
Judo	–	–	–	–	2	1	1	2	1	–	1	1	1	–	1	12
Rowing	–	–	–	–	–	–	–	–	–	–	1	2	–	–	–	3
Sailing	3	–	–	–	–	–	–	–	–	–	–	–	–	1	1	5
Shooting	8	4	–	–	1	–	–	–	1	1	1	1	1	–	1	19
Surfing	–	–	–	–	–	–	–	–	–	–	–	–	–	–	1	1
Swimming	14	7	–	–	2	–	1	2	1	1	1	2	2	2	2	37
Tennis	–	–	–	–	–	–	–	–	–	–	1	–	–	–	–	1
Weightlifting	2	–	–	–	–	–	–	1	1	1	1	1	–	1	–	8
Wrestling	–	–	–	–	1	1	–	–	–	–	1	–	–	–	–	3
Total Athletes^{[b]}	60	11	–	–	10	6	4	8	8	7	11	10	8	5		148

- ^{a} The Total Athletes column indicates the number of athletes who have competed in each sport and is not intended to be a total of the athletes at each Olympic Games as some have participated in multiple Olympic Games.
- ^{b} The Total Athletes row indicates the number of athletes who have competed at each Olympic Games.

== Top finishes by sport ==
=== Summer Olympics ===
Name	Games	Sport	Event	Result	Ref
Ricardo Merlos	2004 Athens	Archery	Men's individual	35th	
Kriscia García	1984 Los Angeles	Athletics (track & road event)	Women's 1500 metres	22nd	
Rosario Martínez	1968 Mexico City	Athletics (field event)	Women's shot put	14th	
Henry Martínez	1988 Seoul	Boxing	Men's – 48 kg	9th (tie)	
Maureen Kaila Vergara	1996 Atlanta	Cycling	Women's points race	5th	
1968 Team	1968 Mexico City	Football	Men's football	13th (tie)	
Juan Vargas	1984 Los Angeles	Judo	Men's 71 kg	9th (tie)	
Camila Vargas Palomo	2012 London	Rowing	Women's single sculls	16th	
Mario Aguilar & Manuel Escobar	1968 Mexico City	Sailing	Flying Dutchman	30th	
Luisa Maida	2008 Beijing	Shooting	Women's 25 metre pistol	8th	
María José Marenco	1992 Barcelona	Swimming	Women's 800 metre freestyle	20th	
Rafael Arévalo	2008 Beijing	Tennis	Men's singles	17th (tie)	
Eva Dimas	2004 Athens	Weightlifting	Women's +75 kg	11th	
Julio Salamanca Pineda	2012 London	Weightlifting	Men's 62 kg	11th	
Íngrid Medrano	2008 Beijing	Wrestling	Women's freestyle 48 kg	9th	

== Summer Olympic Games ==
=== 1968 Mexico City ===
Though the International Olympic Committee recognized El Salvador's National Olympic Committee (Comité Olímpico de El Salvador) in 1938, the nation's first Olympic Games participation did not occur until the 1968 Summer Olympics in Mexico City, Mexico. The contingent of 60 athletes marked the largest in El Salvador's Olympic participation. Salvadorian athletes competed in seven sports (athletics, cycling, football, sailing, shooting, swimming, and weightlifting) but won no medals. Both the all-time youngest and oldest Olympic participants from El Salvador competed at these games. Swimmer Rubén Guerrero (13 years, 351 days) swam in five events: the Men's 400 meters Freestyle, 1,500 meters Freestyle, 4 × 100 meters Freestyle Relay, 100 meters Butterfly, and 200 meters Individual Medley. Roberto Soundy (68 years, 229 days) finished 54th in the Mixed Trap Shooting event. Swimmer Salvador Vilanova was selected to carry his nation's flag during the opening ceremony.

=== 1972 Munich ===
El Salvador's presence was much reduced when the nation sent only 11 athletes to the 1972 Summer Olympics in Munich, West Germany. These athletes competed in swimming and shooting events, marking the lowest number of contested sports in El Salvador's Olympic history. Swimmer Salvador Vilanova was once again selected to carry his nation's flag during the opening ceremony.

=== 1984 Los Angeles ===
No athletes were sent to the 1976 Summer Olympics, and El Salvador took part in the boycott of the 1980 Summer Olympics.

El Salvador returned to Olympic competition by sending ten athletes to participate in the 1984 Summer Olympics in Los Angeles, California, United States. El Salvador competed in athletics, judo, swimming, shooting, and wrestling. Long-distance runner Kriscia García was chosen to carry her nation's flag during the opening ceremony.

=== 1988 Seoul ===
Six athletes were sent to compete at the 1988 Summer Olympics in Seoul, South Korea. Salvadorian athletes competed in athletics, boxing, judo, and wrestling. Wrestler Gustavo Manzur was chosen to carry his nation's flag during the opening ceremony.

=== 1992 Barcelona ===
El Salvador sent its smallest-ever contingent of athletes to the 1992 Summer Olympics in Barcelona, Spain. Four athletes participated in athletics, judo, and swimming. Swimmer María José Marenco was selected to carry her nation's flag during the opening ceremony.

=== 1996 Atlanta ===
Eight Salvadorian athletes competed in the 1996 Summer Olympics in Atlanta, Georgia, United States. They competed in five events: athletics, judo, swimming, cycling, and weightlifting. Cyclist Maureen Kaila Vergara finished fifth, only six points off of the podium, in the first Women's Point Race to be contested at an Olympics. Judoka Juan Vargas was selected to carry his nation's flag during the opening ceremony.

=== 2000 Sydney ===
El Salvador sent eight athletes to the 2000 Summer Olympics in Sydney, Australia. They competed in seven sports: athletics, archery, cycling, judo, shooting, swimming, and weightlifting. Weightlifter Eva Dimas was chosen to carry her nation's flag during the opening ceremony.

=== 2004 Athens ===
Seven athletes were sent to represent El Salvador at the 2004 Summer Olympics in Athens, Greece. The athletes participated in seven sports: athletics, archery, cycling, shooting, swimming, and weightlifting. Cyclist Evelyn García was chosen to carry her nation's flag during the opening ceremony.

=== 2008 Beijing ===
El Salvador competed in more sports at the 2008 Summer Olympics in Beijing, China, than at any other games in their history. Eleven athletes competed in nine sports: athletics, cycling, judo, rowing, shooting, swimming, tennis, weightlifting, and wrestling. Pistol shooter Luisa Maida finished in eighth place in the Women's Sporting Pistol (25 meters), only 15.2 points away from medaling. Weightlifter Eva Dimas, who also carried the flag in 2000, was selected to carry her nation's flag during the opening ceremony.

=== 2012 London ===
Ten Salvadorian athletes were sent to represent their nation at the 2012 Summer Olympics in London, United Kingdom. The nation had representation in seven sports: athletics, rowing, swimming, cycling, judo, shooting, and weightlifting. Cyclist Evelyn García, who also carried the flag in 2004, was selected to carry her nation's flag during the opening ceremony.

== See also ==
- List of Salvadorian Olympians
- List of flag bearers for El Salvador at the Olympics
- El Salvador at the Paralympics
