= List of Salvadoran records in swimming =

The Salvadoran records in swimming are the fastest ever performances of swimmers from El Salvador, which are recognized and ratified by the Federación Salvadoreña de Natación.

All records were set in finals unless noted otherwise.

== Long Course (50 m) ==
=== Men ===
Event	Time		Name	Club	Date	Meet	Location	Ref
50 m freestyle	23.62	h	Nixon Hernández	El Salvador	14 April 2024 (Note: by official result source; 16 April 2024 by national federation source, a typo)	Eindhoven Qualification Meet	Eindhoven, Netherlands	
100 m freestyle	52.20	h	Jose Campo	El Salvador	29 July 2026	CAC Games	Santo Domingo, Dominican Republic	
200 m freestyle	1:50.35	h	Marcelo Acosta	Kentucky	6 May 2017	Arena Pro Swim Series	Atlanta, United States	
400 m freestyle	3:48.82	h	Marcelo Acosta	El Salvador	6 August 2016	Olympic Games	Rio de Janeiro, Brazil	
800 m freestyle	7:55.70	h	Marcelo Acosta	El Salvador	25 July 2017	World Championships	Budapest, Hungary	
1500 m freestyle	15:04.79	h	Marcelo Acosta	El Salvador	29 July 2017	World Championships	Budapest, Hungary	
50 m backstroke	28.01		Rodrigo Suriano	El Salvador	16 March 2013	Central American Games	San José, Costa Rica	
100 m backstroke	59.93		Rodrigo Suriano	El Salvador	17 November 2013	Bolivarian Games	Trujillo, Peru	
200 m backstroke	2:09.27	h	Douwe Yntema	-	28 March 2007	US Spring Championships	East Meadow, United States	
50 m breaststroke	29.64		Juan Guerra	-	13 April 2010	-	Puerto Rico	
100 m breaststroke	1:04.31	h	Francisco Suriano	El Salvador	16 September 2000	Olympic Games	Sydney, Australia	
200 m breaststroke	2:17.10		Rafael Alfaro	El Salvador	29 June 2016	CISC	Nassau, Bahamas	
50m butterfly	25.58		Niccoló Pilenga	El Salvador	11 July 2026	Pan American Championships	Ibague, Colombia	
100m butterfly	55.57		Ruben Pineda	El Salvador	10 August 1998	CAC Games	Maracaibo, Venezuela	
200m butterfly	2:00.54		Xavier Ventura	El Salvador	29 July 2026	CAC Games	Santo Domingo, Dominican Republic	
200m individual medley	2:02.55	b	Rafael Alfaro	El Salvador	18 July 2015	Pan American Games	Toronto, Canada	
400m individual medley	4:27.40	b, =	Rafael Alfaro	El Salvador	16 July 2015	Pan American Games	Toronto, Canada	
400m individual medley	4:27.40	=	Marcelo Acosta	El Salvador	5 December 2017	Central American Games	Managua, Nicaragua	
4×100m freestyle relay	3:37.63		Nixon Hernandez (53.76); Andres Alfaro (55.37); Jose Campo (55.34); Nector Segovia (53.16)	El Salvador	18 August 2023	CCCAN Championships	La Libertad, El Salvador	
4×200m freestyle relay	8:05.14		Carlos Meléndez; Ruben Pineda; Eduardo Aguilar; Kristian Soto	El Salvador	9 December 1997	Central American Games	San Pedro Sula, Honduras	
4×100m medley relay	3:54.67		Eduardo Gil; Francisco Suriano; Ruben Pineda; Kristian Soto	El Salvador	13 August 1998	CAC Games	Maracaibo, Venezuela	

Legend: # – Record awaiting ratification by Federación Salvadoreña de Natación; WR – World record; AM – Americas record; e – equalled existing record;
Records not set in finals: h – heat; sf – semifinal; r – relay 1st leg; rh – relay heat 1st leg; b – B final; † – en route to final mark; so – swim-off; tt – time trial

=== Women ===
Event	Time		Name	Club	Date	Meet	Location	Ref
50m freestyle	25.42		Marina Spadoni	El Salvador	28 July 2026	CAC Games	Santo Domingo, Dominican Republic	
100m freestyle	56.72	b	Marina Spadoni	El Salvador	23 October 2023	Pan American Games	Santiago, Chile	
100m freestyle	56.64	h, #	Marina Spadoni	Unattached	16 May 2024	Longhorn Elite Invite	Austin, United States	
200m freestyle	2:02.28		Pamela Benítez	El Salvador	3 July 2009	CCCAN Championships	Barquisimeto, Venezuela	
400m freestyle	4:14.61		Golda Marcus	-	1 February 2008	-	United States	
800m freestyle	8:44.47		Pamela Benítez	El Salvador	22 July 2010	CAC Games	Mayagüez, Puerto Rico	
1500m freestyle	16:49.37		Golda Marcus	Brandon Sports & Aquatic Center	8 June 2008	Ultra Swim	Charlotte, United States	
50m backstroke	29.55		Celina Márquez	Azura Florida Aquatics	20 May 2021	Puerto Rican International Open	Salinas, Puerto Rico	
100m backstroke	1:01.92	h	Celina Márquez	El Salvador	8 August 2019	Pan American Games	Lima, Peru	
200m backstroke	2:13.83		Celina Márquez	Azura Florida Aquatics	15 November 2020	U.S. Open	Sarasota, United States	
50m breaststroke	33.09	not ratified	Elisa Funes	Univ. Sagrado Corazon	24 April 2023	Justas LAI	Mayagüez, Puerto Rico	
100m breaststroke	1:11.54	h	Andrey Deras	El Salvador	28 July 2026	CAC Games	Santo Domingo, Dominican Republic	
200m breaststroke	2:32.17	h	Andrey Deras	El Salvador	31 July 2026	CAC Games	Santo Domingo, Dominican Republic	
50m butterfly	26.38		Marina Spadoni	El Salvador	1 August 2026	CAC Games	Santo Domingo, Dominican Republic	
100m butterfly	1:02.00		Celina Márquez	Azura Florida Aquatics	1 May 2021	UANA Tokyo Qualifier	Clermont, United States	
200m butterfly	2:22.28	b	Fatima Portillo	El Salvador	23 October 2023	Pan American Games	Santiago, Chile	
200m individual medley	2:20.70		Isabella Alas	El Salvador	14 August 2021	NCSA Championships	Huntsville, United States	
400m individual medley	5:12.33		Elisa Funes	Univ. Sagrado Corazon	26 April 2023	Justas LAI	Mayagüez, Puerto Rico	
4×100m freestyle relay	3:58.70	not ratified	Isabella Alas (1:00.45); Celina Márquez (1:00.82); Elisa Funes (59.72); Marina Spadoni (57.71)	El Salvador	18 August 2023	CCCAN Championships	La Libertad, El Salvador	
4×200m freestyle relay	8:36.40	not ratified	Pamela Benítez (2:05.05); Ana Hernández (2:14.98); Ileana Murillo (2:09.75); Golda Marcus (2:06.62)	El Salvador	17 July 2006	CAC Games	Cartagena, Colombia	
4×100m medley relay	4:21.59		Celina Márquez (1:04.91); Elisa Funes (1:17.41); Isabella Alas (1:00.23); Marina Spadoni (59.04)	El Salvador	15 August 2023	CCCAN Championships	La Libertad, El Salvador	

Legend: # – Record awaiting ratification by Federación Salvadoreña de Natación; WR – World record; AM – Americas record; e – equalled existing record;
Records not set in finals: h – heat; sf – semifinal; r – relay 1st leg; rh – relay heat 1st leg; b – B final; † – en route to final mark; so – swim-off; tt – time trial

=== Mixed relay ===
Event	Time	Name	Club	Date	Meet	Location	Ref
4×50 m freestyle relay	1:53.03	Celina Márquez; Aarón Granadeño; Katherine López; Otto Borgads	El Salvador	7 June 2016	CAMEX	Panama City, Panama	
4×100 m freestyle relay	3:54.37		El Salvador	27 November 2021	Junior Pan American Games	Cali, Colombia	
4×50 m medley relay	2:00.65	Gabriela Vaquero; Otto Borgards; Nixon Hernández; Elisa Funes	Aqua Center	15 December 2022	National Championships	San Salvador, El Salvador	
4×100 m medley relay	4:14.40	Celina Marquez; Elisa Funes; Aaron Grandeño; Marcelo Acosta	El Salvador	20 July 2018	Central American and Caribbean Games	Barranquilla, Colombia	

Legend: # – Record awaiting ratification by Federación Salvadoreña de Natación; e – equalled existing record;
Records not set in finals: h – heat; so – swim-off

== Short Course (25 m) ==
=== Men ===
Event	Time		Name	Club	Date	Meet	Location	Ref
50m freestyle	23.05	h	Nixon Hernández	El Salvador	14 December 2024	World Championships	Budapest, Hungary	
100m freestyle	50.54	h	Nixon Hernández	Merliot Olympic	13 November 2020	-	Polideportivo Vitoria-Gasteiz, El Salvador	
200m freestyle	1:47.00	h	Marcelo Acosta	El Salvador	12 December 2018	World Championships	Hangzhou, China	
400m freestyle	3:42.74	h	Marcelo Acosta	El Salvador	11 December 2018	World Championships	Hangzhou, China	
800m freestyle	7:49.69	h, †	Marcelo Acosta	El Salvador	15 December 2018	World Championships	Hangzhou, China	
1500m freestyle	14:45.78	h	Marcelo Acosta	El Salvador	15 December 2018	World Championships	Hangzhou, China	
50m backstroke	26.15	h	Jose Campo	Stipendium Hungaricum	4 November 2026	Hungarian Championships	Kaposvár, Hungary	
100m backstroke	56.61	h	Jose Campo	Stipendium Hungaricum	5 November 2026	Hungarian Championships	Kaposvár, Hungary	
200m backstroke	2:04.58 (Note: The current federation source lists the 200 backstroke record as 2:12.63 by Suriano from the 2014 World Championships. However, results from the meet show that Suriano went a 2:04.58)	h	Rodrigo Suriano	El Salvador	7 December 2014	World Championships	Doha, Qatar	
50m breaststroke	29.17	h	Juan Guerra Quiñonez	El Salvador	18 December 2010	World Championships	Dubai, United Arab Emirates	
50m breaststroke	29.16	h, †, unratified	Rafael Alfaro	El Salvador	6 December 2016	World Championships	Windsor, Canada	
100m breaststroke	1:02.02	h	Rafael Alfaro	El Salvador	6 December 2016	World Championships	Windsor, Canada	
200m breaststroke	2:14.26	h	Juan Guerra Quiñonez	El Salvador	17 December 2010	World Championships	Dubai, United Arab Emirates	
50m butterfly	25.18	h	Jose Campo	Stipendium Hungaricum	6 November 2026	Hungarian Championships	Kaposvár, Hungary	
100m butterfly	55.24		Ruben Pineda	CDI	1 April 1999	-	Hong Kong, Hong Kong	
200m butterfly	2:05.43		Carlos Melendez	El Salvador	1 November 2002	-	Spain	
100m individual medley	56.06	h	Jose Campo	Stipendium Hungaricum	7 November 2026	Hungarian Championships	Kaposvár, Hungary	
200m individual medley	2:07.94	h	José Campo	El Salvador	31 October 2021	Puerto Rico Open	San José, Puerto Rico	
400m individual medley	4:41.86		Carlos Melendez	El Salvador	8 October 2004	-	United States	
4×50m freestyle relay	1:42.09		Christian Gonzalez; Josue Castillo; Nelson Merino; Ronald Hernandez	Deportivo Merliot Dos	1 October 2008	San Salvador, El Salvador		
4×100m freestyle relay	3:45.93		Harold Sánchez; Alejandro Guirola; Ricardo Garcia; Nixon Hernández	Deportivo Merliot Dos	17 October 2015	National Championships	San Salvador, El Salvador	
4×200m freestyle relay								
4×50m medley relay	1:53.32		Nixon Hernández; Ricardo Garcia; Harold Sánchez; Alejandro Guirola	Deportivo Merliot Dos	17 October 2015	National Championships	San Salvador, El Salvador	
4×100m medley relay	4:10.51		Nixon Hernández; Ricardo Garcia; Harold Sánchez; Alejandro Guirola	Deportivo Merliot Dos	18 October 2015	National Championships	San Salvador, El Salvador	

Legend: # – Record awaiting ratification by Federación Salvadoreña de Natación; WR – World record; AM – Americas record; e – equalled existing record;
Records not set in finals: h – heat; sf – semifinal; r – relay 1st leg; rh – relay heat 1st leg; b – B final; † – en route to final mark; so – swim-off; tt – time trial

=== Women ===
Event	Time		Name	Club	Date	Meet	Location	Ref
50m freestyle	24.73	h	Marina Spadoni	El Salvador	8 October 2026	World Cup	Tashkent, Uzbekistan	
100m freestyle	55.70	h	Marina Spadoni	El Salvador	11 December 2024	World Championships	Budapest, Hungary	
200m freestyle	2:01.76	h	Pamela Benítez	El Salvador	19 December 2010	World Championships	Dubai, United Arab Emirates	
400m freestyle	4:15.79		Golda Marcus	El Salvador	11 April 2008	World Championships	Manchester, Great Britain	
800m freestyle	8:44.97		Golda Marcus	El Salvador	10 April 2008	World Championships	Manchester, Great Britain	
1500m freestyle								
50m backstroke	28.43	h	Celina Márquez	El Salvador	28 October 2022	World Cup	Toronto, Canada	
100m backstroke	1:00.82	h	Celina Márquez	El Salvador	29 October 2022	World Cup	Toronto, Canada	
200m backstroke	2:10.23		Celina Márquez	El Salvador	30 October 2022	World Cup	Toronto, Canada	
50m breaststroke	32.93	h	Elisa Funes	El Salvador	16 December 2021	World Championships	Abu Dhabi, United Arab Emirates	
100m breaststroke	1:11.36	h	Elisa Funes	El Salvador	19 December 2021	World Championships	Abu Dhabi, United Arab Emirates	
200m breaststroke	2:35.42		Elisa Funes	Aqua Center	21 October 2022	Puerto Rico International Open	San Juan, Puerto Rico	
50m butterfly	25.99	h	Marina Spadoni	El Salvador	9 October 2026	World Cup	Tashkent, Uzbekistan	
100m butterfly	1:00.60	h	Celina Márquez	El Salvador	15 December 2018	World Championships	Hangzhou, China	
200m butterfly	2:23.04	h	Fatima Portillo	El Salvador	3 November 2022	World Cup	Indianapolis, United States	
100m individual medley	1:04.40		Isabella Alas	Merliot Olympic Swimming Team	4 September 2021	National Championships	La Libertad, El Salvador	
200m individual medley	2:20.41		Isabella Alas	Merliot Olympic Swimming Team	1 September 2021	National Championships	La Libertad, El Salvador	
400m individual medley	5:13.64		Rebeca Quinteros	El Salvador	26 September 2015	-	San Juan, Puerto Rico	
400m individual medley	5:09.79	unratified	Rebeca Quinteros	El Salvador	4 December 2015	Puerto Rican Championships	San Juan, Puerto Rico	
4×50m freestyle relay	2:00.20		Katherine López; Krisscia Solórzano; Genesis Granadeño; Michele Cornejo	-	7 October 2016	National Championships	San Salvador, El Salvador	
4×100m freestyle relay	4:18.52		Paula Guevara; Vanessa García; Laura Cisneros; Celina Márquez	Deportivo Merliot Dos	17 October 2015	National Championships	San Salvador, El Salvador	
4×200m freestyle relay								
4×50m medley relay	2:14.13		Fátima Peñate; Pamela Flamenco; Cristina Cisneros; Nadia Sánchez	Aquatica La Libertad	8 October 2016	National Championships	San Salvador, El Salvador	
4×100m medley relay	4:49.99		Laura Gil; Laura Ferracuti; Elvia Castro; Andrea Ramirez	CDI	2 April 1995	-	San Salvador, El Salvador	

Legend: # – Record awaiting ratification by Federación Salvadoreña de Natación; WR – World record; AM – Americas record; e – equalled existing record;
Records not set in finals: h – heat; sf – semifinal; r – relay 1st leg; rh – relay heat 1st leg; b – B final; † – en route to final mark; so – swim-off; tt – time trial

=== Mixed relay ===
Event	Time	Name	Club	Date	Meet	Location	Ref
4×100m freestyle relay	3:54.91	Ricardo Garcia; Laura Cisneros; Celina Márquez; Nixon Hernández	Deportivo Merliot Dos	15 October 2015	National Championships	San Salvador, El Salvador	
4×100m medley relay	4:24.42	Celina Márquez; David Guevara; Laura Cisneros; Ricardo Garcia	Deportivo Merliot Dos	16 October 2015	National Championships	San Salvador, El Salvador	

Legend: # – Record awaiting ratification by Federación Salvadoreña de Natación; WR – World record; AM – Americas record; e – equalled existing record;
Records not set in finals: h – heat; so – swim-off
