= El Salvador at the 2008 Summer Olympics =

- IOC code: ESA
- NOC: El Salvador Olympic Committee
- Website: www.teamesa.org (in Spanish)

in Beijing
- Competitors: 11 in 9 sports
- Flag bearer: Eva Dimas
- Medals: Gold 0 Silver 0 Bronze 0 Total 0

Summer Olympics appearances (overview)
- 1968; 1972; 1976–1980; 1984; 1988; 1992; 1996; 2000; 2004; 2008; 2012; 2016; 2020; 2024; 2028

El Salvador competed at the 2008 Summer Olympics in Beijing, China, from 8 to 24 August 2008. This was the nation's ninth appearance at the Olympics.

Weightlifter Eva Dimas, who carried the flag in 2000, was again selected to carry her nation's flag during the opening ceremony.

== Competitors ==
Comité Olímpico de El Salvador selected a team of 11 athletes, 4 men and 7 women, to compete in 9 sports. Weightlifter Eva Dimas, at age 35, was the oldest athlete of the team, while cyclist Mario Contreras was the youngest at age 21.

The following is the list of number of competitors participating in the Games:

Sport	Men	Women	Total
Athletics	1	1	2
Cycling	1	1	2
Judo	1	0	1
Rowing	0	1	1
Shooting	0	1	1
Swimming	0	1	1
Tennis	1	0	1
Weightlifting	0	1	1
Wrestling	0	1	1
Total	4	7	11

== Athletics ==
Key

- Note–Ranks given for track events are within the athlete's heat only
- Q = Qualified for the next round
- q = Qualified for the next round as a fastest loser or, in field events, by position without achieving the qualifying target
- NR = National record
- N/A = Round not applicable for the event
- Bye = Athlete not required to compete in round

Men
Track & road events

Athlete	Event	Final	
Athlete	Event	Result	Rank
Salvador Mira	50 km walk	DSQ	

Women
Track & road events

Athlete	Event	Final	
Athlete	Event	Result	Rank
Verónica Colindres	20 km walk	1:36.52	38

== Cycling ==
=== Road ===
Athlete	Event	Time	Rank
Mario Wilfredo Contreras	Men's road race	Did not finish	

=== Track ===
Pursuit

Athlete	Event	Qualification		Semifinals		Final	
Athlete	Event	Time	Rank	Opponent Results	Rank	Opponent Results	Rank
Evelyn García	Women's individual pursuit	3:56.849	13	Did not advance			

Omnium

Athlete	Event	Points	Laps	Rank
Evelyn García	Women's points race	0	0	16

== Judo ==
Athlete	Event	Preliminary	Round of 32	Round of 16	Quarterfinals	Semifinals	Repechage 1	Repechage 2	Repechage 3	Final / BM	
Athlete	Event	Opposition Result	Opposition Result	Opposition Result	Opposition Result	Opposition Result	Opposition Result	Opposition Result	Opposition Result	Opposition Result	Rank
Franklin Cisneros	Men's −81 kg	Bye	Stevens (USA); L 0000–1011	Did not advance							

== Rowing ==
Women

Athlete	Event	Heat		Quarterfinal		Semifinal		Final	
Athlete	Event	Time	Rank	Time	Rank	Time	Rank	Time	Rank
Camila Vargas Palomo	Single sculls	8:32:06	3 QF	8:11:79	5 SC/D	8:22.35	4 FD	8:02.91	22

Qualification Legend: FA=Final A (medal); FB=Final B (non-medal); FC=Final C (non-medal); FD=Final D (non-medal); FE=Final E (non-medal); FF=Final F (non-medal); SA/B=Semifinals A/B; SC/D=Semifinals C/D; SE/F=Semifinals E/F; QF=Quarterfinals; R=Repechage

== Shooting ==
Women

Athlete	Event	Qualification		Final	
Athlete	Event	Points	Rank	Points	Rank
Luisa Maida	10 m air pistol	375	34	Did not advance	
Luisa Maida	25 m pistol	582	6 Q	774.0	8

== Swimming ==
Women

Athlete	Event	Heat		Final	
Athlete	Event	Time	Rank	Time	Rank
Golda Marcus	400 m freestyle	4:23:50	39	Did not advance	
Golda Marcus	800 m freestyle	8:51.21	35	Did not advance	

== Tennis ==
Athlete	Event	Round of 64	Round of 32	Round of 16	Quarterfinal	Semifinal	Final / BM	
Athlete	Event	Opposition Score	Opposition Score	Opposition Score	Opposition Score	Opposition Score	Opposition Score	Rank
Rafael Arévalo	Men's singles	Lee H-T (KOR); W 4–6, 6–3, 6–4	Federer (SUI); L 2–6, 4–6	Did not advance				

== Weightlifting ==
Athlete	Event	Snatch		Clean & Jerk		Total	Rank
Athlete	Event	Result	Rank	Result	Rank	Total	Rank
Eva Dimas	Women's +75 kg	105	9	~~127~~	DNF	105	DNF

== Wrestling ==
Key:

- VT - Victory by Fall.
- PP - Decision by Points - the loser with technical points.
- PO - Decision by Points - the loser without technical points.

Women's freestyle

Athlete	Event	Qualification	Round of 16	Quarterfinal	Semifinal	Repechage 1	Repechage 2	Final / BM	
Athlete	Event	Opposition Result	Opposition Result	Opposition Result	Opposition Result	Opposition Result	Opposition Result	Opposition Result	Rank
Íngrid Medrano	−48 kg	Bye	Dobre (ROU); W 3–1 ^{PP}	Bakatyuk (KAZ); L 0–3 ^{PO}	Did not advance				9

== See also ==
- El Salvador at the 2007 Pan American Games
- El Salvador at the 2010 Central American and Caribbean Games
