= El Salvador at the 1996 Summer Olympics =

- IOC code: ESA
- NOC: El Salvador Olympic Committee
- Website: www.teamesa.org (in Spanish)

in Atlanta
- Competitors: 7 (6 men and 2 women) in 5 sports
- Flag bearer: Juan Carlos Vargas
- Medals: Gold 0 Silver 0 Bronze 0 Total 0

Summer Olympics appearances (overview)
- 1968; 1972; 1976–1980; 1984; 1988; 1992; 1996; 2000; 2004; 2008; 2012; 2016; 2020; 2024

El Salvador competed at the 1996 Summer Olympics in Atlanta, Georgia, United States, from 19 July to 4 August 1996. This was the nation's sixth appearance at the Olympics.

Comité Olímpico de El Salvador sent a total of 8 athletes to the Games, 6 men and 2 women, to compete in 5 sports. Judoka Juan Vargas was selected to carry his nation's flag during the opening ceremony.

== Competitors ==
Comité Olímpico de El Salvador selected a team of 8 athletes, 6 men and 2 women, to compete in 5 sports. Judoka Juan Vargas, at age 32, was the oldest athlete of the team, while swimmer Francisco Suriano was the youngest at age 17.

The following is the list of number of competitors participating in the Games.

Sport	Men	Women	Total
Athletics	1	1	2
Cycling	0	1	1
Judo	2	0	2
Swimming	2	0	2
Weightlifting	1	0	1
Total	6	2	8

== Athletics ==
Men
Track & road events

Athlete	Event	Round 1		Round 2		Semifinal		Final	
Athlete	Event	Result	Rank	Result	Rank	Result	Rank	Result	Rank
Rubén Benítez	100 m	10.74	6	Did not advance					

Women
Track & road events

Athlete	Event	Round 1		Round 2		Semifinal		Final	
Athlete	Event	Result	Rank	Result	Rank	Result	Rank	Result	Rank
Arely Franco	400 m	1:01.38	7	Did not advance					

== Cycling ==
=== Road ===
Women

Athlete	Event	Time	Rank
Maureen Kaila Vergara	Road race	DNF	

=== Track ===
Women

Athlete	Event	Points	Laps	Rank
Maureen Kaila Vergara	Points race	11	0	5

== Judo ==
Men

Athlete	Event	Preliminary	Round of 32	Round of 16	Quarterfinal	Semifinal	Repechage 1	Repechage 2	Repechage 3	Final / BM	
Athlete	Event	Opposition Result	Opposition Result	Opposition Result	Opposition Result	Opposition Result	Opposition Result	Opposition Result	Opposition Result	Opposition Result	Rank
Carlos Rodolfo Ramírez	65 kg	Laurén (FIN); L	Did not advance								=34
Juan Vargas	71 kg	BYE	Al-Sharrah (KUW); L	Did not advance							=21

== Swimming ==
Men

Athlete	Event	Heat		Semifinal		Final	
Athlete	Event	Result	Rank	Result	Rank	Result	Rank
Francisco Suriano	100 m breaststroke	1:05.82	37	—N/a		Did not advance	
Francisco Suriano	200 m breaststroke	2:25.57	32	—N/a		Did not advance	
Rubén Ernesto Pineda	100 m butterfly	56.01	37	—N/a		Did not advance	

== Weightlifting ==
Men

Athlete	Event	Snatch		Clean & jerk		Total	Rank
Athlete	Event	Result	Rank	Result	Rank	Total	Rank
Francisco Cáceres	64 kg	115.0	=29	145.0	=29	260	31

== See also ==
- El Salvador at the 1995 Pan American Games
