= El Salvador at the 1984 Summer Olympics =

- IOC code: ESA
- NOC: El Salvador Olympic Committee

in Los Angeles
- Competitors: 10 (9 men and 1 woman) in 5 sports
- Flag bearer: Kriscia García
- Medals: Gold 0 Silver 0 Bronze 0 Total 0

Summer Olympics appearances (overview)
- 1968; 1972; 1976–1980; 1984; 1988; 1992; 1996; 2000; 2004; 2008; 2012; 2016; 2020; 2024

El Salvador competed at the 1984 Summer Olympics in Los Angeles, California, United States, from 28 July to 12 August 1984. This was the nation's third appearance at the Olympics. The nation previously missed the 1976 Summer Olympics and participated in the 1980 Summer Olympics boycott.

Comité Olímpico de El Salvador sent a total of 10 athletes to the Games, 9 men and 1 women, to compete in 5 sports. Long-distance runner Kriscia García was chosen to carry her nation's flag during the opening ceremony.

== Prior to the Games ==
On May 28, 1984, the president of the Comité Olímpico de El Salvador, Valerio Montes, warned that El Salvador might be forced to join the Soviet-led boycott if the $28,000 entry fee required of its athletes were not raised by the June 2 deadline, a figure which Montes doubted "could be raised in time". The IOC had previously offered to pay all expenses for six Salvadoran athletes, but Montes noted that the Salvadorans would refuse the funds in principle in order to show the Salvadoran Government "that it must pay more attention to the nation's youth and sports' programs". Referring to the $62 million recently approved by the U.S. Government for military aid to El Salvador, Montes suggested a possible solution whereby President Reagan and the American Congress would "order the armed forces to give us less than one percent of what has been designated for weapons to be able to participate in the Games". In response, spokesman Donald Hamilton of the U.S. Embassy in San Salvador declined to provide any funds, stating that "since we don't fund our own athletes, we don't see how we could fund those from a foreign country". Montes was instead advised by the embassy spokesman to pursue financial aid from local sources or from the IOC. Ten athletes from El Salvador eventually competed at the Games.

== Competitors ==
Comité Olímpico de El Salvador selected a team of 10 athletes, 9 men and 1 women, to compete in 5 sports. Trap shooter Julio González, at age 40, was the oldest athlete of the team, while swimmer Juan Miranda was the youngest at age 16. The following is the list of number of competitors participating in the Games.

Sport	Men	Women	Total
Athletics	3	1	4
Judo	2	0	2
Shooting	1	0	1
Swimming	2	0	2
Wrestling	1	0	1
Total	9	1	10

== Athletics ==
Men
Track & road events

Athlete	Event	Heat		Quarterfinal		Semifinal		Final	
Athlete	Event	Result	Rank	Result	Rank	Result	Rank	Result	Rank
Aldo Salandra	100 m	11.31	7	did not advance					
Aldo Salandra	200 m	22.90	7	did not advance					
René Lopez	400 m	48.71	8	did not advance					
Luis Campos	20 km walk	—						1:48:45	37

Women
Track & road events

Athlete	Event	Heat		Semifinal		Final	
Athlete	Event	Result	Rank	Result	Rank	Result	Rank
Kriscia García	1500 m	—		4:38.00	12	did not advance	
Kriscia García	3000 m	9:42.28	9	—		did not advance	

== Judo ==
Men

Athlete	Event	Round of 16	Quarterfinal	Semifinal	Repechage 1	Repechage 2	Repechage 3	Final / BM	
Athlete	Event	Opposition Result	Opposition Result	Opposition Result	Opposition Result	Opposition Result	Opposition Result	Opposition Result	Rank
Fredy Torres	65 kg	Sergio Sano (BRA); L	did not advance						=20
Juan Vargas	71 kg	Auck Kalwihzi (ZAM); W	Byeong-Keun Ahn (KOR); L	did not advance	Kieran Foley (IRL); L	did not advance			=9

== Swimming ==
Women

Athlete	Event	Heat		Final	
Athlete	Event	Result	Rank	Result	Rank
Salvador Salguero	100 m backstroke	1:04.99	38	did not advance	
Salvador Salguero	200 m backstroke	2:21.75	32	did not advance	
Juan Miranda	100 m butterfly	1:04.33	45	did not advance	
Juan Miranda	200 m butterfly	2:38.32	34	did not advance	

== Shooting ==
Men

Athlete	Event	Final	
Athlete	Event	Score	Rank
Julio González Suvillaga	Trap	124	69

== Wrestling ==
Men's Freestyle

Athlete	Event	Eliminatory round						Final	Rank
Athlete	Event	Round 1	Round 2	Round 3	Round 4	Round 5	Round 6 / 7	Final	Rank
Gustavo Manzur	68 kg	Singh (IND); L 0–14	Knosp (FRG); L 2:34	Did not advance					AC

Men's Greco-Roman

Athlete	Event	Eliminatory round						Final	Rank
Athlete	Event	Round 1	Round 2	Round 3	Round 4	Round 5	Round 6 / 7	Final	Rank
Gustavo Manzur	62 kg	Dietsche (SUI); L 0–12	Kim (KOR); L 0:20	Did not advance					AC
