= El Salvador at the 2012 Summer Olympics =

- IOC code: ESA
- NOC: El Salvador Olympic Committee
- Website: www.teamesa.org (in Spanish)

in London
- Competitors: 10 in 7 sports
- Flag bearers: Evelyn García (opening); Melissa Mikec (closing)
- Medals: Gold 0 Silver 0 Bronze 0 Total 0

Summer Olympics appearances (overview)
- 1968; 1972; 1976–1980; 1984; 1988; 1992; 1996; 2000; 2004; 2008; 2012; 2016; 2020; 2024

El Salvador competed at the 2012 Summer Olympics in London, United Kingdom, from 27 July to 12 August 2012. This was the nation's tenth appearance at the Olympics.

Comité Olímpico de El Salvador sent a total of 10 athletes to the Games, 5 men and 5 women, to compete in 7 sports. Rifle shooter Melissa Mikec, wife of Serbian athlete Damir Mikec, chose to compete for her nation's team, despite also having Serbian citizenship on account of her marriage to Mikec. Road cyclist Evelyn García, who was at her third Olympic Games, reprised her role as El Salvador's flag bearer at the opening ceremony, the first being done in 2004. El Salvador, however, has yet to win its first Olympic medal.

== Competitors ==
Comité Olímpico de El Salvador selected a team of 10 athletes, 5 men and 5 women, to compete in 7 sports. Road cyclist Evelyn García, at age 29, was the oldest athlete of the team, while rower Roberto López was the youngest at age 18.

The following is the list of number of competitors participating in the Games.

Sport	Men	Women	Total
Athletics	1	1	2
Cycling	0	1	1
Judo	1	0	1
Rowing	1	1	2
Shooting	0	1	1
Swimming	1	1	2
Weightlifting	1	0	1
Total	5	5	10

== Athletics ==
Athletes from El Salvador achieved qualifying standards in the following athletics events (up to a maximum of 3 athletes in each event at the 'A' Standard, and 1 at the 'B' Standard):

Key

- Note–Ranks given for track events are within the athlete's heat only
- Q = Qualified for the next round
- q = Qualified for the next round as a fastest loser or, in field events, by position without achieving the qualifying target
- NR = National record
- N/A = Round not applicable for the event
- Bye = Athlete not required to compete in round

Men

Athlete	Event	Final	
Athlete	Event	Result	Rank
Emerson Esnal Hernández	50 km walk	3:53:57 NR	27

Women

Athlete	Event	Heat		Semifinal		Final	
Athlete	Event	Result	Rank	Result	Rank	Result	Rank
Nataly Landaverde	1500 m	4:18.26 NR	15	did not advance			

== Cycling ==
=== Road ===
Athlete	Event	Time	Rank
Evelyn García	Women's road race	3:35:56	26

== Judo ==
Athlete	Event	Round of 64	Round of 32	Round of 16	Quarterfinals	Semifinals	Repechage	Final / BM	
Athlete	Event	Opposition Result	Opposition Result	Opposition Result	Opposition Result	Opposition Result	Opposition Result	Opposition Result	Rank
Carlos Figueroa	Men's −66 kg	Mehmedovic (CAN); L 0000–0010	did not advance						

== Rowing ==
El Salvador qualified the following boats:

Men

Athlete	Event	Heats		Repechage		Quarterfinals		Semifinals		Final	
Athlete	Event	Time	Rank	Time	Rank	Time	Rank	Time	Rank	Time	Rank
Roberto López	Single sculls	7:23.75	4 R	7:27.75	5 SE/F	Bye		7:57.89	3 FE	7:41.32	29

Women

Athlete	Event	Heats		Repechage		Quarterfinals		Semifinals		Final	
Athlete	Event	Time	Rank	Time	Rank	Time	Rank	Time	Rank	Time	Rank
Camila Vargas Palomo	Single sculls	8:01:60	5 R	7:53:38	1 QF	8:07:67	6 SC/D	7:57.22	3 FC	8:19.75	16

Qualification Legend: FA=Final A (medal); FB=Final B (non-medal); FC=Final C (non-medal); FD=Final D (non-medal); FE=Final E (non-medal); FF=Final F (non-medal); SA/B=Semifinals A/B; SC/D=Semifinals C/D; SE/F=Semifinals E/F; QF=Quarterfinals; R=Repechage

== Shooting ==
Women

Athlete	Event	Qualification		Final	
Athlete	Event	Points	Rank	Points	Rank
Melissa Mikec	10 m air rifle	392	39	did not advance	
Melissa Mikec	50 m rifle 3 positions	560	45	did not advance	

== Swimming ==
Men

Athlete	Event	Heat		Final	
Athlete	Event	Time	Rank	Time	Rank
Rafael Alfaro	400 m individual medley	4:35.80	35	did not advance	

Women

Athlete	Event	Heat		Final	
Athlete	Event	Time	Rank	Time	Rank
Pamela Benítez	800 m freestyle	9:02.66	33	did not advance	

Qualifiers for the latter rounds (Q) of all events were decided on a time only basis, therefore positions shown are overall results versus competitors in all heats.

== Weightlifting ==
El Salvador qualified the following athletes:

Athlete	Event	Snatch		Clean & Jerk		Total	Rank
Athlete	Event	Result	Rank	Result	Rank	Total	Rank
Julio Salamanca	Men's −62 kg	110	12	150	11	260	11

== See also ==
- El Salvador at the 2011 Pan American Games
