= El Salvador at the 1988 Summer Olympics =

- IOC code: ESA
- NOC: El Salvador Olympic Committee

in Seoul
- Competitors: 5 (4 men and 1 woman) in 3 sports
- Flag bearer: Gustavo Manzur
- Medals: Gold 0 Silver 0 Bronze 0 Total 0

Summer Olympics appearances (overview)
- 1968; 1972; 1976–1980; 1984; 1988; 1992; 1996; 2000; 2004; 2008; 2012; 2016; 2020; 2024

El Salvador competed at the 1988 Summer Olympics in Seoul, South Korea, from 17 September to 2 October 1988. This was the nation's fourth appearance at the Olympics.

Comité Olímpico de El Salvador sent a total of 6 athletes to the Games, 5 men and 1 women, to compete in 4 sports. Wrestler Gustavo Manzur was chosen to carry his nation's flag during the opening ceremony.

== Competitors ==
Comité Olímpico de El Salvador selected a team of 6 athletes, 5 men and 1 women, to compete in 4 sports. Wrestler Gustavo Manzur, at age 28, was the oldest athlete of the team, while boxer Henry Martínez was the youngest at age 17.

The following is the list of number of competitors participating in the Games.

Sport	Men	Women	Total
Athletics	1	1	2
Boxing	2	0	2
Judo	1	0	1
Wrestling	1	0	1
Total	5	1	6

== Athletics ==
Men
Combined events

Athlete	Event		100 m	LJ	SP	HJ	400 m	110H	DT	PV	JT	1500 m	Final	Rank
Santiago Mellado	Decathlon	Result	11.33	6.83	11.63	2.06	48.37	15.39	37.52	4.60	55.42	4:30.07	7517	26
Santiago Mellado	Decathlon	Points	789	774	584	859	891	803	614	790	669	744	7517	26

Women
Track & road events

Athlete	Event	Final	
Athlete	Event	Result	Rank
Kriscia Lorena García	Marathon	3:04:21	58

== Boxing ==
Men

Athlete	Event	Round of 64	Round of 32	Round of 16	Quarterfinals	Semifinals	Final
Athlete	Event	Opposition Result	Opposition Result	Opposition Result	Opposition Result	Opposition Result	Opposition Result
Henry Martínez	Light Flyweight	Cheikh (ALG); W 5–0	Ben-Haim (ISR); W (walk-over)	Marinov (BUL); L 0–5	Did not advance		
Francisco Avelar	Featherweight	BYE	Achik (MAR); L 1–4	Did not advance			

== Judo ==
Men

Athlete	Event	Preliminary	Round of 32	Round of 16	Quarterfinals	Semifinals	Repechage 1	Repechage 2	Repechage 3	Final / BM	
Athlete	Event	Opposition Result	Opposition Result	Opposition Result	Opposition Result	Opposition Result	Opposition Result	Opposition Result	Opposition Result	Opposition Result	Rank
Fredy Torres	71 kg	BYE	Giorgi Tenadze (URS); L	Did not advance							=33

== Wrestling ==
Men's Freestyle

Athlete	Event	Eliminatory round						Final	Rank
Athlete	Event	Round 1	Round 2	Round 3	Round 4	Round 5	Round 6 / 7	Final	Rank
Gustavo Manzur	68 kg	El-Khodary (EGY); L 19–3	Wattar (SYR); L 3–16	Did not advance					AC

Men's Greco-Roman

Athlete	Event	Eliminatory round						Final	Rank
Athlete	Event	Round 1	Round 2	Round 3	Round 4	Round 5	Round 6 / 7	Final	Rank
Gustavo Manzur	68 kg	Souaken (MAR); L 5:40	Sipilä (FIN); L 0–15	Did not advance					AC

== See also ==
- El Salvador at the 1987 Pan American Games
