= El Salvador at the 2017 World Aquatics Championships =

- Flag of El Salvador
- World Aquatics code: ESA
- National federation: Federacíon Salvadoreña de Natacíon

in Budapest, Hungary
- Competitors: 4 in 2 sports
- Medals: Gold 0 Silver 0 Bronze 0 Total 0

World Aquatics Championships appearances
- 1973; 1975; 1978; 1982; 1986; 1991; 1994; 1998; 2001; 2003; 2005; 2007; 2009; 2011; 2013; 2015; 2017; 2019; 2022; 2023; 2024; 2025

El Salvador competed at the 2017 World Aquatics Championships in Budapest, Hungary from 14 July to 30 July.

== Open water swimming ==
El Salvador has entered one open water swimmer

Athlete	Event	Time	Rank
Fatima Flores	Women's 5 km	1:07:09.4	49
Fatima Flores	Women's 10 km	2:18:47.9	54

== Swimming ==
Salvadoran swimmers have achieved qualifying standards in the following events (up to a maximum of 2 swimmers in each event at the A-standard entry time, and 1 at the B-standard):

Athlete	Event	Heat		Semifinal		Final	
Athlete	Event	Time	Rank	Time	Rank	Time	Rank
Marcelo Acosta	Men's 200 m freestyle	1:50.92	48	did not advance			
Marcelo Acosta	Men's 400 m freestyle	3:51.76	24	—N/a		did not advance	
Marcelo Acosta	Men's 800 m freestyle	7:55.70	14	—N/a		did not advance	
Marcelo Acosta	Men's 1500 m freestyle	15:04.79	14	—N/a		did not advance	
Otto Borgards	Men's 100 m breaststroke	1:10.62	69	did not advance			
Otto Borgards	Men's 200 m breaststroke	2:30.73	40	did not advance			
Celina Marquez	Women's 50 m backstroke	30.38	45	did not advance			
Celina Marquez	Women's 200 m backstroke	2:22.73	30	did not advance			
