= El Salvador at the 2024 Summer Olympics =

- IOC code: ESA
- NOC: El Salvador Olympic Committee
- Website: www.teamesa.org (in Spanish)

in Paris 26 July 2024 – 11 August 2024
- Competitors: 8 (7 men and 1 woman) in 7 sports
- Flag bearers: Uriel Canjura & Celina Márquez
- Medals: Gold 0 Silver 0 Bronze 0 Total 0

Summer Olympics appearances (overview)
- 1968; 1972; 1976–1980; 1984; 1988; 1992; 1996; 2000; 2004; 2008; 2012; 2016; 2020; 2024

El Salvador competed at the 2024 Summer Olympics in Paris, France from 26 July to 11 August 2024. The nation made its official Olympic debut at the 1968 Summer Olympics in Mexico City, Mexico. Salvadoran athletes have participated in every Games of the Olympiad since that time, excluding those held in 1976 and 1980, when the nation joined the American-led boycott in protest of the Soviet invasion of Afghanistan.

== Competitors ==
The following is the list of number of competitors in the Games.

Sport	Men	Women	Total
Archery	1	0	1
Badminton	1	0	1
Judo	1	0	1
Sailing	1	0	1
Shooting	1	0	1
Surfing	1	0	1
Swimming	1	1	2
Total	7	1	8

== Archery ==
El Salvador entered one archer for Paris 2024 in the men's individual recurve competition through the allocations of universality places.

Athlete	Event	Ranking round		Round of 64	Round of 32	Round of 16	Quarterfinals	Semifinals	Final / BM	
Athlete	Event	Score	Seed	Opposition Score	Opposition Score	Opposition Score	Opposition Score	Opposition Score	Opposition Score	Rank
Oscar Ticas	Men's individual	643	53	Wang (CHN); L 0–6	Did not advance					

== Badminton ==
For the first time, El Salvador entered one badminton players into the Olympic tournament based on the BWF Race to Paris Rankings.

Athlete	Event	Group stage			Elimination	Quarter-final	Semi-final	Final / BM	
Athlete	Event	Opposition Score	Opposition Score	Rank	Opposition Score	Opposition Score	Opposition Score	Opposition Score	Rank
Uriel Canjura	Men's singles	Louda (CZE); L (12–21, 10–21)	Loh (SGP); L (13–21, 16–21)	3	Did not advance				

== Judo ==
For the first time since 2016, El Salvador qualified one judoka for the following weight class at the Games. Jairo Moreno (men's 60 kg) qualified for the games through the allocations of universality places.

Athlete	Event	Round of 32	Round of 16	Quarterfinals	Semifinals	Repechage	Final / BM	
Athlete	Event	Opposition Result	Opposition Result	Opposition Result	Opposition Result	Opposition Result	Opposition Result	Rank
Jairo Moreno	Men's −60 kg	Verstraeten (BEL); L 00–01	Did not advance					

== Sailing ==
Salvadoran sailors secured a quota place in the following events, through the allocations of Emerging Nations Program.

Medal race events

Athlete	Event	Race											Net points	Final rank
Athlete	Event	1	2	3	4	5	6	7	8	9	10	M*	Net points	Final rank
Enrique Arathoon	Men's ILCA 7	4	33	16	~~34~~	16	15	19	17	Canceled		EL	120	20

== Shooting ==
For the first time since 2016, El Salvador shooters achieved one quota places for Paris 2024 based on the allocations of universality spots.

Athlete	Event	Qualification		Final	
Athlete	Event	Points	Rank	Points	Rank
Israel Gutierrez	Men's 10 m air rifle	621.1	46	Did not advance	
Israel Gutierrez	Men's 50 m rifle 3 positions	576-20x	40	Did not advance	

== Surfing ==
El Salvador entered one surfer to compete for the games, marking the country's debut in the sport. Bryan Pérez obtained one spots for his nations through the allocations universality spots.

Athlete	Event	Round 1		Round 2	Round 3	Quarterfinal	Semifinal	Final / BM	
Athlete	Event	Score	Rank	Opposition Result	Opposition Result	Opposition Result	Opposition Result	Opposition Result	Rank
Bryan Pérez	Men's shortboard	7.53	3 R2	Boukhiam (MAR); L 12.60–14.60	Did not advance				

== Swimming ==
El Salvador entered one male swimmer and one female swimmer to compete for the games.

Athlete	Event	Heat		Semifinal		Final	
Athlete	Event	Time	Rank	Time	Rank	Time	Rank
Nixon Hernández	Men's 100 m freestyle	52.73	65	Did not advance			
Celina Márquez	Women's 100 m backstroke	1:04.55	32	Did not advance			
