= El Salvador at the 2024 World Aquatics Championships =

- Flag of El Salvador
- FINA code: ESA
- National federation: Federación Salvadoreña de Natación

in Doha, Qatar
- Competitors: 7 in 3 sports
- Medals: Gold 0 Silver 0 Bronze 0 Total 0

World Aquatics Championships appearances
- 1973; 1975; 1978; 1982; 1986; 1991; 1994; 1998; 2001; 2003; 2005; 2007; 2009; 2011; 2013; 2015; 2017; 2019; 2022; 2023; 2024

El Salvador competed at the 2024 World Aquatics Championships in Doha, Qatar from 2 to 18 February.

== Competitors ==
The following is the list of competitors in the Championships.

Sport	Men	Women	Total
Artistic swimming	0	2	2
Open water swimming	0	1	1
Swimming	2	2	3
Total	2	5	7

== Artistic swimming ==
Women

Athlete	Event	Preliminaries		Final	
Athlete	Event	Points	Rank	Points	Rank
Cesia Castaneda	Solo free routine	136.6501	23	Did not advance	
Grecia Mendoza	Solo technical routine	175.0434	22	Did not advance	
Cesia Castaneda; Grecia Mendoza	Duet technical routine	187.1016	30	Did not advance	
Cesia Castaneda; Grecia Mendoza	Duet free routine	143.1771	28	Did not advance	

== Open water swimming ==
Wpmen

Athlete	Event	Time	Rank
Jeison Rojas	5 km	1:04:47.7	45
Jeison Rojas	10 km	2:21:11.7	63

== Swimming ==
El Salvador entered 4 swimmers.

Men

Athlete	Event	Heat		Semifinal		Final	
Athlete	Event	Time	Rank	Time	Rank	Time	Rank
Nixon Hernández	50 metre freestyle	24.01	62	Did not advance			
Nixon Hernández	100 metre freestyle	52.41	67	Did not advance			
Xavier Ventura	400 metre freestyle	4:07.35	47	—		Did not advance	
Xavier Ventura	200 metre butterfly	2:03.87	33	Did not advance			

Women

Athlete	Event	Heat		Semifinal		Final	
Athlete	Event	Time	Rank	Time	Rank	Time	Rank
Celina Márquez	100 metre backstroke	1:04.29	32	Did not advance			
Celina Márquez	200 metre backstroke	2:18.69	24	Did not advance			
Marina Spadoni	50 metre freestyle	26.30	44	Did not advance			
Marina Spadoni	50 metre butterfly	27.64	33	Did not advance			
