= El Salvador at the 2000 Summer Olympics =

- IOC code: ESA
- NOC: El Salvador Olympic Committee
- Website: www.teamesa.org (in Spanish)

in Sydney
- Competitors: 8 (4 men and 4 women) in 7 sports
- Flag bearer: Eva Dimas
- Medals: Gold 0 Silver 0 Bronze 0 Total 0

Summer Olympics appearances (overview)
- 1968; 1972; 1976–1980; 1984; 1988; 1992; 1996; 2000; 2004; 2008; 2012; 2016; 2020; 2024

El Salvador competed at the 2000 Summer Olympics in Sydney, Australia, from 15 September to 1 October 2000. This was the nation's seventh appearance at the Olympics.

Comité Olímpico de El Salvador sent a total of 8 athletes to the Games, 4 men and 4 women, to compete in 7 sports. Weightlifter Eva Dimas was chosen to carry her nation's flag during the opening ceremony.

== Competitors ==
Comité Olímpico de El Salvador selected a team of 8 athletes, 4 men and 4 women, to compete in 7 sports. Cyclist Maureen Kaila, at age 35, was the oldest athlete of the team, while pistol shooter Luisa Maida was the youngest at age 20.

The following is the list of number of competitors participating in the Games.

Sport	Men	Women	Total
Archery	1	0	1
Athletics	1	1	2
Cycling	0	1	1
Judo	1	0	1
Shooting	0	1	1
Swimming	1	0	1
Weightlifting	0	1	1
Total	4	4	8

== Archery ==
Men

In El Salvadors's debut archery competition, the nation entered only one man. He lost his first match.

Athlete	Event	Qualification		Round of 64	Round of 32	Round of 16	Quarterfinal	Semifinal	Final	Rank
Athlete	Event	Result	Rank	Opposition Result	Opposition Result	Opposition Result	Opposition Result	Opposition Result	Opposition Result	Rank
Cristóbal Merlos	Individual	588	55	Wunderle (USA); L 160–150	did not advance					

== Athletics ==
Men
Track & road events

Athlete	Event	Heat		Semifinal		Final	
Athlete	Event	Result	Rank	Result	Rank	Result	Rank
Tony Serpas	100 m	10.63	6	did not advance			

Women
Track & road events

Athlete	Event	Final	
Athlete	Event	Result	Rank
Ivis Martínez	20 km walk	1:38:07	34

== Cycling ==
=== Track ===
Women

Athlete	Event	Points	Laps	Rank
Maureen Kaila Vergara	Women's points race	0	0	17

== Judo ==
Men

Athlete	Event	Preliminary	Round of 32	Round of 16	Quarterfinals	Semifinals	Repechage 1	Repechage 2	Repechage 3	Final / BM	
Athlete	Event	Opposition Result	Opposition Result	Opposition Result	Opposition Result	Opposition Result	Opposition Result	Opposition Result	Opposition Result	Opposition Result	Rank
Miguel Antonio Moreno	66 kg	BYE	David Somerville (GBR); L 0000-1000	did not advance							AC

== Shooting ==
Women

Athlete	Event	Qualification		Final	
Athlete	Event	Score	Rank	Score	Rank
Luisa Cristina Maida	10 m air pistol	368	36	did not advance	
Luisa Cristina Maida	25 m pistol	557	41	did not advance	

== Swimming ==
Men

Athlete	Event	Heat		Semifinal		Final	
Athlete	Event	Result	Rank	Result	Rank	Result	Rank
Francisco Suriano	100 m breaststroke	01:04.31	37	did not advance			
Francisco Suriano	200 m breaststroke	02:20.10	35	did not advance			

== Weightlifting ==
Women

Athlete	Event	Snatch		Clean & Jerk		Total	Rank
Athlete	Event	Result	Rank	Result	Rank	Total	Rank
Eva Dimas	69 kg	92.5	=11	110.0	12	202.5	12

== See also ==
- El Salvador at the 1999 Pan American Games
