= El Salvador at the 2020 Summer Olympics =

- Flag of El Salvador
- IOC code: ESA
- NOC: El Salvador Olympic Committee
- Website: www.coes.org.sv

in Tokyo, Japan July 23 – August 8, 2021
- Competitors: 6 in 4 sports
- Flag bearers: Celina Márquez; Enrique Arathoon
- Medals: Gold 0 Silver 0 Bronze 0 Total 0

Summer Olympics appearances (overview)
- 1968; 1972; 1976–1980; 1984; 1988; 1992; 1996; 2000; 2004; 2008; 2012; 2016; 2020; 2024

El Salvador competed at the 2020 Summer Olympics in Tokyo, Japan, from 23 July to 8 August 2021. It was the nation's twelfth appearance at the Summer Olympics, since its debut at the 1968 Summer Olympics in Mexico City. The El Salvadoran delegation consisted of six athletes competing in four sports. El Salvador did not win any medals at the Games.

== Background ==
The El Salvador Olympic Committee (Comité Olímpico de El Salvador) was formed on 6 April 1949 and recognized by the International Olympic Committee in 1962. The nation made its first Olympic appearance at the 1968 Summer Olympics in Mexico City. Since, then it has been absent only from the 1976 and 1980 Games. The 2020 Summer Olympics was the nation's twelfth appearance at the Summer Olympics. The nation has not won an Olympic medal.

The 2020 Summer Olympics were held in Tokyo, Japan, between 23 July and 8 August 2021. Originally scheduled to take place from 24 July to 9 August 2020, the Games were postponed due to the COVID-19 pandemic. For the first time, the International Olympic Committee invited each National Olympic Committee to select one female and one male athlete to jointly carry their flag during the opening ceremony. Swimmer Celina Márquez and sailor Enrique Arathoon served as El Salvador's flag-bearers at the opening ceremony. No athlete was present from El Salvador at the closing ceremony. None of the six athletes won a medal at the Games.

== Competitors ==
The El Salvadoran delegation consisted of one track and field athlete José Andrés Salazar, boxer Yamileth Solórzano, sailor Enrique Arathoon, and swimmers Marcelo Acosta and Celina Márquez.

Sport	Men	Women	Total
Athletics	1	0	1
Boxing	0	1	1
Sailing	1	0	1
Swimming	1	1	2
Total	3	2	5

== Athletics ==
As per the governing body World Athletics (WA), a NOC was allowed to enter up to three qualified athletes in each individual event if the Olympic Qualifying Standards (OQS) for the respective events had been met during the qualifying period. The remaining places were allocated based on the World Athletics Rankings which were derived from the average of the best five results for an athlete over the designated qualifying period, weighted by the importance of the meet. El Salvador received a universality slot from the World Athletics to send a male athlete to the Olympics.

The athletics events were held at the Japan National Stadium in Tokyo. José Andrés Salazar represented El Salvador in the men's 200 m event. This was the first and only Olympic appearance for Salazar. He finished seventh in his preliminary heat and did not advance further. However, he was classified as sixth after Divine Oduduru of Nigeria, who had finished second, was disqualified.

Key

- Note–Ranks given for track events are within the athlete's heat only
- Q = Qualified for the next round
- q = Qualified for the next round as a fastest loser or, in field events, by position without achieving the qualifying target
- NR = National record
- N/A = Round not applicable for the event
- Bye = Athlete not required to compete in round

Track & road events

Athlete	Event	Heat		Semifinal		Final	
Athlete	Event	Result	Rank	Result	Rank	Result	Rank
José Andrés Salazar	Men's 200 m	21.66	6	Did not advance			

== Boxing ==
The qualification to the Olympic Games was determined by the performance of the boxers at the four continental Olympic qualifying tournaments (Africa, Americas, Asia & Oceania, and Europe) and at the World Olympic qualification tournament. The final list of qualifiers was announced on 15 July 2021. El Salvador qualified one boxer, Yamileth Solórzano, in the women's featherweight category. This was the second ever appearance for El Salvador in the sport at the Summer Olympics, after Donald Martínez and Frank Avelar represented the nation at the 1988 Summer Olympics.

The boxing events were held at the Ryōgoku Kokugikan. In the round of 32, Solórzano was defeated by eventual gold medalist Sena Irie of Japan. She lost by the bout by a unanimous decision after all the five referees scored in favour of the Japanese boxer.

Athlete	Event	Round of 31	Round of 16	Quarterfinals	Semifinals	Final	
Athlete	Event	Opposition Result	Opposition Result	Opposition Result	Opposition Result	Opposition Result	Rank
Yamileth Solórzano	Women's featherweight	Irie (JPN); L 0–5	Did not advance				

== Sailing ==
The qualification period for the sailing event commenced at the 2018 Sailing World Championships in Aarhus, Denmark where about forty percent of the total quota was awarded to the top NOCs. Six quota places were allocated at the 2018 Asian Games and 2019 Pan American Games, with 61 quotas across events distributed to the sailors at the World Championships in 2019. The final continental qualification regattas were held in 2021 to decide the remainder of the total quota. El Salvador qualified one boat in the Laser event.

Enrique Arathoon competed in his second consecutive Olympics after he finished 24th at the same event in the 2016 Summer Olympics. Arathoon, who holds dual citizenship of Guatemala and El Salvador, represented El Salvador through his mother, and became the first sailor to represent El Salvador at two Olympic Games. In the sailing event, points are awarded to the athletes based on their placement in each of the ten races with the best nine out of ten scores counted for the final placement, and determining the qualification to the medal race. Arathoon ended in the 23rd spot amongst the 35 competitors with 165 net points and did not qualify for the medal race. He finished 28th in the first race, befiore improving to 17th in the second race, and 11th in the third race, which was his best finish across the ten races. However, he slipped in the later races, to finish outside the qualification places.

Athlete	Event	Race											Net points	Final rank
Athlete	Event	1	2	3	4	5	6	7	8	9	10	M*	Net points	Final rank
Enrique Arathoon	Men's Laser	~~28~~	17	11	25	27	19	25	17	15	9	EL	165	23

M = Medal race; EL = Eliminated – did not advance into the medal race

== Swimming ==
As per the Fédération internationale de natation (FINA) guidelines, a NOC was permitted to enter a maximum of two qualified athletes in each individual event, who have achieved the Olympic Qualifying Time (OQT). If the quota was not filled, one athlete per event was allowed to enter per NOC, provided they achieved the Olympic Selection Time (OST) in competitions approved by World Aquatics in the period between 1 March 2019 to 27 June 2021. If the overeall quota was not met, FINA allowed NOCs to enter one swimmer per gender under a universality place even if they have not achieved the standard entry times (OQT/OST). El Salvador received a universality invitation from FINA to send two top-ranked swimmers (one per gender) in their respective individual events to the Olympics, based on the FINA points as on 28 June 2021.

The swimming events were held at the Tokyo Aquatics Centre. Marcelo Acosta, competing in his second consecutive Olympics, participated in the men's 800 m freestyle and men's 1500 m freestyle events. He finished 31st in the 800 m with a time of 8:03.01, and 25th in the 1500 m with 15:27.37, and did not advance to either final. Celina Márquez, who was making her Olympic debut, competed in the women's 100 m backstroke and women's 200 m backstroke events, placing 36th and 23rd respectively, and did not advance past the heats.

Athlete	Event	Heat		Semifinal		Final	
Athlete	Event	Time	Rank	Time	Rank	Time	Rank
Marcelo Acosta	Men's 800 m freestyle	8:03.01	31	—N/a		Did not advance	
Marcelo Acosta	Men's 1500 m freestyle	15:27.37	25	—N/a		Did not advance	
Celina Márquez	Women's 100 m backstroke	1:03.75	36	Did not advance			
Celina Márquez	Women's 200 m backstroke	2:14.72	23	Did not advance			

== See also ==
- El Salvador at the 2016 Summer Olympics
- El Salvador at the 2019 Pan American Games
- El Salvador at the 2024 Summer Olympics
