= El Salvador at the 2016 Summer Olympics =

- IOC code: ESA
- NOC: El Salvador Olympic Committee
- Website: www.teamesa.org (in Spanish)

in Rio de Janeiro
- Competitors: 8 in 6 sports
- Flag bearers: Lilian Castro (opening); Enrique Arathoon (closing)
- Medals: Gold 0 Silver 0 Bronze 0 Total 0

Summer Olympics appearances (overview)
- 1968; 1972; 1976–1980; 1984; 1988; 1992; 1996; 2000; 2004; 2008; 2012; 2016; 2020; 2024

El Salvador competed at the 2016 Summer Olympics in Rio de Janeiro, Brazil, from 5 to 21 August 2016. This was the nation's eleventh appearance at the Summer Olympics, although it first competed in 1968.

El Salvador Olympic Committee (Spanish: Comité Olímpico de El Salvador) confirmed a team of eight athletes, five men and three women, to compete in six sports at the Games. This was also the youngest delegation in El Salvador's Summer Olympic history, with more than half under the age of 25, and many of them expected to reach their peak in time for the 2020 Olympics in Tokyo.

The majority of El Salvador's athletes made their Olympic debut in Rio de Janeiro, with weightlifter Julio Salamanca being the only sportsman to return for his second appearance from London 2012. Other notable Salvadoran athletes featured Enrique Arathoon, the nation's first ever sailor for nearly half a century, and Marcelo Acosta, bronze medalist in long-distance freestyle swimming at the Youth Olympics in Nanjing two years earlier. Air pistol shooter Lilian Castro, the oldest member of the squad (aged 29), acted as El Salvador's flag bearer in the opening ceremony.

El Salvador, however, was yet to win its first Olympic medal at the end of the 2016 Summer Games.

== Athletics (track and field) ==
Salvadoran athletes have so far achieved qualifying standards in the following athletics events (up to a maximum of 3 athletes in each event):

Key

- Note–Ranks given for track events are within the athlete's heat only
- Q = Qualified for the next round
- q = Qualified for the next round as a fastest loser or, in field events, by position without achieving the qualifying target
- NR = National record
- N/A = Round not applicable for the event
- Bye = Athlete not required to compete in round

Track & road events

Athlete	Event	Final	
Athlete	Event	Result	Rank
Luis Menjivar	Men's 50 km walk	DSQ	
Yesenia Miranda	Women's 20 km walk	DNF	

== Judo ==
El Salvador qualified one judoka for the men's half-middleweight category (81 kg) at the Games. Juan Diego Turcios earned a continental quota spot from the Pan American region, as El Salvador's top-ranked judoka outside of direct qualifying position in the IJF World Ranking List of 30 May 2016.

Athlete	Event	Round of 64	Round of 32	Round of 16	Quarterfinals	Semifinals	Repechage	Final / BM	
Athlete	Event	Opposition Result	Opposition Result	Opposition Result	Opposition Result	Opposition Result	Opposition Result	Opposition Result	Rank
Juan Diego Turcios	Men's −81 kg	Bye	Moustopoulos (GRE); W 100–000	Tchrikishvili (GEO); L 000–000 S	Did not advance				

== Sailing ==
El Salvador qualified a boat in men's Laser class by virtue of a top finish for Central & South America at the 2015 Pan American Games, signifying the nation's Olympic return to the sport for the first time since 1968.

Athlete	Event	Race											Net points	Final rank
Athlete	Event	1	2	3	4	5	6	7	8	9	10	M*	Net points	Final rank
Enrique Arathoon	Men's Laser	~~33~~	32	28	30	4	3	9	32	18	21	EL	177	24

M = Medal race; EL = Eliminated – did not advance into the medal race

== Shooting ==
El Salvador qualified one shooter in the women's pistol events by virtue of her best finish at the 2014 American Continental Championships, and other selection competitions, as long as she obtained a minimum qualifying score (MQS) by 31 March 2016.

Athlete	Event	Qualification		Final	
Athlete	Event	Points	Rank	Points	Rank
Lilian Castro	Women's 10 m air pistol	366	44	Did not advance	

Qualification Legend: Q = Qualify for the next round; q = Qualify for the bronze medal (shotgun)

== Swimming ==
Salvadoran swimmers have so far achieved qualifying standards in the following events (up to a maximum of 2 swimmers in each event at the Olympic Qualifying Time (OQT), and potentially 1 at the Olympic Selection Time (OST)):

Athlete	Event	Heat		Semifinal		Final	
Athlete	Event	Time	Rank	Time	Rank	Time	Rank
Marcelo Acosta	Men's 200 m freestyle	1:51.46	43	Did not advance			
Marcelo Acosta	Men's 400 m freestyle	3:48.82	22	—		Did not advance	
Marcelo Acosta	Men's 1500 m freestyle	15:08.17	22	—		Did not advance	
Rebeca Quinteros	Women's 400 m freestyle	4:52.11	32	—		Did not advance	

== Weightlifting ==
El Salvador received an unused quota place from IWF to send a male weightlifter to the Olympics, as a response to the complete ban of the Russian weightlifting team from the Games due to "multiple positive" cases of doping.

Athlete	Event	Snatch		Clean & Jerk		Total	Rank
Athlete	Event	Result	Rank	Result	Rank	Total	Rank
Julio Salamanca	Men's −62 kg	120	9	155	9	275	10

== See also ==
- El Salvador at the 2015 Pan American Games
