= El Salvador at the 2004 Summer Olympics =

- IOC code: ESA
- NOC: El Salvador Olympic Committee
- Website: www.teamesa.org (in Spanish)

in Athens
- Competitors: 7 in 6 sports
- Flag bearer: Evelyn García
- Medals: Gold 0 Silver 0 Bronze 0 Total 0

Summer Olympics appearances (overview)
- 1968; 1972; 1976–1980; 1984; 1988; 1992; 1996; 2000; 2004; 2008; 2012; 2016; 2020; 2024

El Salvador was represented at the 2004 Summer Olympics in Athens, Greece by the El Salvador Olympic Committee.

In total, seven athletes including two men and five women represented El Salvador in six different sports including archery, athletics, cycling, shooting, swimming and weightlifting.

== Competitors ==
In total, seven athletes represented El Salvador at the 2004 Summer Olympics in Athens, Greece across six different sports.

Sport	Men	Women	Total
Archery	1	0	1
Athletics	1	1	2
Cycling	0	1	1
Shooting	0	1	1
Swimming	0	1	1
Weightlifting	0	1	1
Total	2	5	7

== Archery ==
In total, one Salvadorian athlete participated in the archery events – Ricardo Merlos in the men's individual.

The ranking round for the men's individual took place on 12 August 2004. Merlos scored 630 points and was ranked 51st. The first round took place on 16 August 2004. Merlos lost 152–151 to Wietse van Alten of the Netherlands.

Athlete	Event	Ranking round		Round of 64	Round of 32	Round of 16	Quarterfinals	Semifinals	Final / BM	
Athlete	Event	Score	Seed	Opposition Score	Opposition Score	Opposition Score	Opposition Score	Opposition Score	Opposition Score	Rank
Ricardo Merlos	Men's individual	630	51	van Alten (NED); L 151–152	Did not advance					

== Athletics ==
In total, two Salvadorian athletes participated in the athletics events – Takeshi Fujiwara in the men's 400 m and Elizabeth Zaragoza in the women's 5,000 m.

The heats for the men's 400 m took place on 20 August 2004. Fujiwara finished sixth in his heat in a time of 48.46 seconds and he did not advance to the semi-finals.

Athlete	Event	Heat		Semifinal		Final	
Athlete	Event	Result	Rank	Result	Rank	Result	Rank
Takeshi Fujiwara	400 m	48.46	7	Did not advance			

The heats for the women's 5,000 m took place on 20 August 2004. Zaragoza did not finish.

Athlete	Event	Heat		Final	
Athlete	Event	Result	Rank	Result	Rank
Elizabeth Zaragoza	5,000 m	DNF		Did not advance	

== Cycling ==
In total, one Salvadorian athlete participated in the cycling events – Evelyn García in the women's road race and the women's individual pursuit.

The women's road race took place on 15 August 2004. García completed the course in a time of three hours 28 minutes 39 seconds and finished 35th overall.

Athlete	Event	Time	Rank
Evelyn García	Women's road race	3:28:39	35

The qualifying round for the women's individual pursuit took place on 21 August 2004. García completed the course in a time of three minutes 56.055 seconds and was ranked 12th overall. She did not advance to the first round.

Athlete	Event	Qualification		Semifinals		Final	
Athlete	Event	Time	Rank	Opponent Results	Rank	Opponent Results	Rank
Evelyn García	Women's individual pursuit	3:56.055	12	Did not advance			

== Shooting ==
In total, one Salvadorian athlete participated in the shooting events – Patricia Rivas in the women's 10 m air rifle.

The preliminary round for the women's 10 m air rifle took place on 14 August 2004. Rivas scored 393 points across the four rounds and was ranked joint 20th. She did not advance to the final.

Athlete	Event	Qualification		Final	
Athlete	Event	Points	Rank	Points	Rank
Patricia Rivas	10 m air rifle	393	=20	Did not advance	

== Swimming ==
In total, one Salvadorian athlete participated in the swimming events – Golda Marcus in the women's 400 m freestyle and the women's 800 m freestyle.

The heats for the women's 400 m freestyle took place on 15 August 2004. Marcus finished second in her heat in a time of four minutes 22.27 seconds which was ultimately not fast enough to advance to the final.

The heats for the women's 800 m freestyle took place on 19 August 2004. Marcus finished first in her heat in a time of eight minutes 59.81 seconds which was ultimately not fast enough to advance to the final.

Athlete	Event	Heat		Final	
Athlete	Event	Time	Rank	Time	Rank
Golda Marcus	400 m freestyle	4:22.27	33	Did not advance	
Golda Marcus	800 m freestyle	8:59.81	21	Did not advance	

== Weightlifting ==
In total, one Salvadorian athlete participated in the weightlifting events – Eva María Dimas in the women's −75 kg category.

The women's −75 kg category took place on 19 and 20 August 2004. Dimas lifted 105 kg (snatch) and 125 kg (clean and jerk) for a combined total of 230 kg to finish 11th.

Athlete	Event	Snatch		Clean & Jerk		Total	Rank
Athlete	Event	Result	Rank	Result	Rank	Total	Rank
Eva María Dimas	Women's −75 kg	105	11	125	11	230	11

== See also ==
- El Salvador at the 2003 Pan American Games
- El Salvador at the 2004 Summer Paralympics
