= Cycling at the 2000 Summer Olympics – Women's points race =

Cycling at the Olympics

These are the official results of the Women's Points Race at the 2000 Summer Olympics in Sydney, Australia. There were a total number of 17 participants competing in the final, which was held on 21 September 2000.

The women's points race in cycling at the 2000 Summer Olympics consisted of a 100 laps (25 kilometre) points race with 10 sprints where points were awarded. 5 points were given to the first finisher of each sprint, with 3 going to the second-place finisher, 2 going to the third place cyclist, and 1 going to the fourth place rider. Double points were award in the final sprint. The winner is determined first by number of laps, and then by the total number of points accumulated.

== Medalists ==
Gold:	Silver:	Bronze:
Antonella Bellutti Italy	Leontien Zijlaard Netherlands	Olga Slyusareva Russia

== Results ==
Rank	Name	Nation	Sprint Points	Extra Laps
1	Antonella Bellutti	Italy	19	0
2	Leontien Zijlaard	Netherlands	16	0
3	Olga Slyusareva	Russia	15	0
4	Judith Arndt	Germany	12	0
5	Belem Guerrero	Mexico	12	0
6	Marion Clignet	France	11	0
7	Teodora Ruano	Spain	10	0
8	Sarah Ulmer	New Zealand	9	0
9	Alayna Burns	Australia	7	0
10	Erin Mirabella	United States	6	0
11	María Luisa Calle	Colombia	2	0
12	Rasa Mažeikytė	Lithuania	2	0
13	Fang Fen-fang	Chinese Taipei	0	0
14	Emma Davies	Great Britain	0	0
15	Michaela Brunngraber	Austria	0	0
16	Akemi Morimoto	Japan	0	0
17	Maureen Kaila	El Salvador	0	0
