= El Salvador at the 2022 World Aquatics Championships =

- Flag of El Salvador
- World Aquatics code: ESA
- National federation: Salvadoran Swimming Federation
- Website: fedenatsv.com (in Spanish)

in Budapest, Hungary
- Competitors: 3 in 2 sports
- Medals: Gold 0 Silver 0 Bronze 0 Total 0

World Aquatics Championships appearances
- 1973; 1975; 1978; 1982; 1986; 1991; 1994; 1998; 2001; 2003; 2005; 2007; 2009; 2011; 2013; 2015; 2017; 2019; 2022; 2023; 2024; 2025

El Salvador competed at the 2022 World Aquatics Championships in Budapest, Hungary from 17 June to 3 July.

== Open water swimming ==
El Salvador qualified one female open water swimmer.

Athlete	Event	Time	Rank
Fátima Portillo	Women's 5 km	1:04:56.7	37
Fátima Portillo	Women's 10 km	2:15:24.2	46

== Swimming ==
El Salvador entered two swimmers.

Men

Athlete	Event	Heat		Semifinal		Final	
Athlete	Event	Time	Rank	Time	Rank	Time	Rank
José Campo	200 metre freestyle	1:55.74	50	did not advance			
José Campo	50 m backstroke	28.45	45	did not advance			

Women

Athlete	Event	Heat		Semifinal		Final	
Athlete	Event	Time	Rank	Time	Rank	Time	Rank
Isabella Alas	100 m freestyle	59.00	35	did not advance			
Isabella Alas	100 m butterfly	1:02.83	24	did not advance			
