= Salvadoran National Road Championships =

National road cycling championships in El Salvador

Race details
- Date: June
- Discipline: Road
- Type: One-day race

History
- First edition: 2006

The Salvadoran National Road Championships are held annually to decide the national cycling champions of El Salvador in both the road race and time trial discipline, across various categories.

== Men ==
=== Road race ===
Year	Winner	Second	Third
2006	Carlos Ávalos	Giovanni Guevara	Manuel Hernández
2008	Alberto Guevara	Giovanni Guevara	Nelson Hernández
2009	Reynaldo Murillo	Diego Vides	Manuel Hernández
2010	Mario Wilfredo Contreras	Giovanni Guevara	Miguel Duarte
2011	Omar Benítez	Jimmy López	Rubén Galán
2012	Jimmy López	Rafael Carías	Miguel Duarte
2013	Rafael Carías	Charlie Quiñonez	Jimmy López
2014	Rafael Carías	Charlie Quiñonez	Miguel Duarte
2015	Erick Herrera	Francisco de León	Dagoberto Joya
2016	Jeremías Escobar	Irvin Huezo	Charlie Quiñonez
2017	Dagoberto Joya	Bryan Mendoza	Giovanni Guevara
2018	Bryan Mendoza	José Guevara	José García
2019	Alfonso Orellana	Bryan Mendoza	Charlie Quiñonez
2020	Dagoberto Joya	Jaime Tejada	Raúl Monroy
2021	Carlos Alvergue	Dagoberto Joya	Alfonso Orellana
2022	Bryan Mendoza	Dagoberto Joya	Raúl Monroy

=== Time trial ===
Year	Winner	Second	Third
2006	Mario Wilfredo Contreras	Giovanni Guervara	Miguel Duarte
2008	Paolo Ferraro	Ernesto Guirola
2009	Mario Wilfredo Contreras	Douglas Hernández	Reynaldo Murillo
2010	Mario Wilfredo Contreras	Giovanni Guevara	Miguel Duarte
2011	Omar Benítez	Jimmy López	Giovanni Guevara
2012	Giovanni Guevara	Edwin Santillana	William Soriano
2013	Giovanni Guevara	Rafael Carías	Edgar Galán
2014	Rafael Carías	Teodoro Santamaria	Francisco de León
2015	Rafael Carías	Irvin Huezo	Dagoberto Joya
2016	Omar Benítez	Rafael Carías	Dagoberto Joya
2017	Dagoberto Joya	Giovanni Guevara	Rafael Carías
2018	Bryan Mendoza	José Guevara	Jesús Herrera
2019	Dagoberto Joya	Alfonso Orellana	Efrain Ortiz
2020	Brandon Rodriguez	Herbert Cardona	Dagoberto Joya
2021	Raúl Monroy	Alfonso Orellana	Bryan Mendoza
2022	Raúl Monroy	Gregory Guardado	Bryan Mendoza

== Women ==
=== Road race ===
Year	Winner	Second	Third
2006	Evelyn García	Ana Gabriela Larios	Rocío Menéndez
2007	Evelyn García	Priscila Ramos	Michelle Ortiz
2008	Roxana Ortiz
2009	Evelyn García	Xenia Estrada	Nathaly Majano
2010	Evelyn García	Xenia Estrada	Nathaly Majano
2011	Evelyn García	Xenia Estrada	Karen Cruz
2012	Ana Figueroa	Nathaly Majano	Xenia Estrada
2013	Iris Díaz	Ana Figueroa
2014	Xenia Estrada	Ana Figueroa	Iris Díaz
2015	Evelyn García	Ana Lucrecia Figueroa	Xenia Estrada
2016	Xenia Estrada
2017	Evelyn García	Xenia Estrada	Iris Díaz
2018	Adriana Alfaro	Brenda Aparicio	Alejandra Cardona
2019	Ana Estrada	Sauking Shi	Gabriela Cárcamo
2020	Iris Díaz	Gabriela Cárcamo	Wendy Páez
2021	Iris Díaz	Karen Umaña	Xenia Estrada
2022	Sauking Shi	Yancy Valladares	Zaira Martínez

=== Time trial ===
Year	Winner	Second	Third
2006	Evelyn García	Ana Gabriela Larios
2007	Evelyn García	Michelle Ortiz	Priscila Ramos
2008	Roxana Ortiz	Pricila Ramos
2009	Evelyn García	Michelle Ortiz	Xenia Estrada
2010	Evelyn García	Xenia Estrada	Nathaly Majano
2011	Evelyn García	Roxana Ortiz	Beatriz Quiroz
2012	Xenia Estrada	Ana Figueroa	Nathaly Majano
2013	Ana Figueroa	Xenia Estrada	Karen Cruz
2014	Xenia Estrada	Ana Figueroa
2015	Evelyn García	Aída Turcios	Ana Figueroa
2016	Ana Figueroa	Roxana Ortiz	Vanessa Serrano
2017	Evelyn García	Ana Figueroa	Xenia Estrada
2018	Roxana Ortiz	Brenda Aparicio	Alejandra Cardona
2019	Xenia Estrada	Vanessa Serrano	Sauking Shi
2020	Karen Umaña	Xenia Estrada	Wendy Paez
2021	Serena Torres	Madelline Mendoza	Karen Umaña
2022	Sauking Shi	Xenia Estrada	Madelline Mendoza
