= El Salvador at the 1992 Summer Olympics =

- IOC code: ESA
- NOC: El Salvador Olympic Committee

in Barcelona
- Competitors: 4 (3 men and 1 woman) in 3 sports
- Flag bearer: María José Marenco
- Medals: Gold 0 Silver 0 Bronze 0 Total 0

Summer Olympics appearances (overview)
- 1968; 1972; 1976–1980; 1984; 1988; 1992; 1996; 2000; 2004; 2008; 2012; 2016; 2020; 2024

El Salvador competed at the 1992 Summer Olympics in Barcelona, Spain, from 25 July to 9 August 1992. This was the nation's fifth appearance at the Olympics.

Comité Olímpico de El Salvador sent a total of 4 athletes to the Games, 3 men and 1 women, to compete in 3 sports. This is the smallest-ever contingent of Salvadorian athletes at the Games. Swimmer María José Marenco was selected to carry her nation's flag during the opening ceremony.

== Competitors ==
Comité Olímpico de El Salvador selected a team of 4 athletes, 3 men and 1 women, to compete in 5 sports. Judoka Juan Vargas, at age 29, was the oldest athlete of the team, while swimmer María José Marenco was the youngest at age 15.

The following is the list of number of competitors participating in the Games.

Sport	Men	Women	Total
Athletics	2	0	2
Judo	1	0	1
Swimming	0	1	1
Total	3	1	4

== Athletics ==
Men
Field events

Athlete	Event	Round 1		Round 2		Semifinal		Final	
Athlete	Event	Result	Rank	Result	Rank	Result	Rank	Result	Rank
Angelo Ianuzzelli	Long jump	7.31 m	20	—				did not advance	
Herbert Rodríguez	Discus throw	43.22 m	16	—				did not advance	

== Judo ==
Men

Athlete	Event	Preliminary	Round of 32	Round of 16	Quarterfinal	Semifinal	Repechage 1	Repechage 2	Repechage 3	Final / BM	
Athlete	Event	Opposition Result	Opposition Result	Opposition Result	Opposition Result	Opposition Result	Opposition Result	Opposition Result	Opposition Result	Opposition Result	Rank
Juan Vargas	71 kg	Mohamed Al-Jalai (YEM); W	Toshihiko Koga (JPN); L	did not advance							=13

== Swimming ==
Women

Athlete	Event	Heats		Semifinal		Final	
Athlete	Event	Result	Rank	Result	Rank	Result	Rank
María José Marenco	200 m freestyle	2:09.36	32	—		did not advance	
María José Marenco	400 m freestyle	4:29.32	26	—		did not advance	
María José Marenco	800 m freestyle	9:09.41	20	—		did not advance	
