= El Salvador at the 2015 World Aquatics Championships =

- Flag of El Salvador
- FINA code: ESA
- National federation: Federacíon Salvadoreña de Natacíon

in Kazan, Russia
- Competitors: 4 in 2 sports
- Medals: Gold 0 Silver 0 Bronze 0 Total 0

World Aquatics Championships appearances
- 1973; 1975; 1978; 1982; 1986; 1991; 1994; 1998; 2001; 2003; 2005; 2007; 2009; 2011; 2013; 2015; 2017; 2019; 2022; 2023; 2024

El Salvador competed at the 2015 World Aquatics Championships in Kazan, Russia from 24 July to 9 August 2015.

== Open water swimming ==
El Salvador has qualified one swimmer to compete in the open water marathon.

| Athlete | Event | Time | Rank |
|---|---|---|---|
| Fatima Flores | Women's 5 km | 1:04:49.4 | 31 |
| Fatima Flores | Women's 10 km | 2:12:38.9 | 44 |

== Swimming ==
Salvadoran swimmers have achieved qualifying standards in the following events (up to a maximum of 2 swimmers in each event at the A-standard entry time, and 1 at the B-standard):

Men

| Athlete | Event | Heat | | Semifinal | | Final | |
| Athlete | Event | Time | Rank | Time | Rank | Time | Rank |
|---|---|---|---|---|---|---|---|
| Marcelo Acosta | 200 m freestyle | 1:50.77 | 44 | did not advance | | | |
| Marcelo Acosta | 400 m freestyle | 3:51.45 | 29 | — | | did not advance | |
| Marcelo Acosta | 800 m freestyle | 8:12.52 | 35 | — | | did not advance | |
| Marcelo Acosta | 1500 m freestyle | 15:25.14 | 25 | — | | did not advance | |
| Rafael Alfaro | 200 m individual medley | 2:05.78 | 38 | did not advance | | | |

Women

| Athlete | Event | Heat | | Semifinal | | Final | |
| Athlete | Event | Time | Rank | Time | Rank | Time | Rank |
|---|---|---|---|---|---|---|---|
| Rebeca Quinteros | 200 m freestyle | 2:06.75 | 50 | did not advance | | | |
| Rebeca Quinteros | 400 m individual medley | 5:17.71 | 35 | — | | did not advance | |
