= El Salvador at the 2019 World Aquatics Championships =

- Flag of El Salvador
- FINA code: ESA
- National federation: Salvadoran Swimming Federation
- Website: fedenatsv.com (in Spanish)

in Gwangju, South Korea
- Competitors: 4 in 2 sports
- Medals: Gold 0 Silver 0 Bronze 0 Total 0

World Aquatics Championships appearances
- 1973; 1975; 1978; 1982; 1986; 1991; 1994; 1998; 2001; 2003; 2005; 2007; 2009; 2011; 2013; 2015; 2017; 2019; 2022; 2023; 2024

El Salvador competed at the 2019 World Aquatics Championships in Gwangju, South Korea from 12 to 28 July.

== Open water swimming ==
El Salvador qualified one female open water swimmer.

Athlete	Event	Time	Rank
Fatima Flores	Women's 10 km	2:12:00.6	57

== Swimming ==
El Salvador entered three swimmers.

Men

Athlete	Event	Heat		Semifinal		Final	
Athlete	Event	Time	Rank	Time	Rank	Time	Rank
Marcelo Acosta	400 m freestyle	3:55.06	31	—		did not advance	
Nixon Hernández	50 m freestyle	24.12	74	did not advance			
Nixon Hernández	100 m freestyle	52.74	84	did not advance			

Women

Athlete	Event	Heat		Semifinal		Final	
Athlete	Event	Time	Rank	Time	Rank	Time	Rank
Celina Márquez	100 m backstroke	1:02.94	38	did not advance			
Celina Márquez	100 m butterfly	1:03.93	42	did not advance			
