= Henrique Rodrigues =

Brazilian swimmer (born 1991)

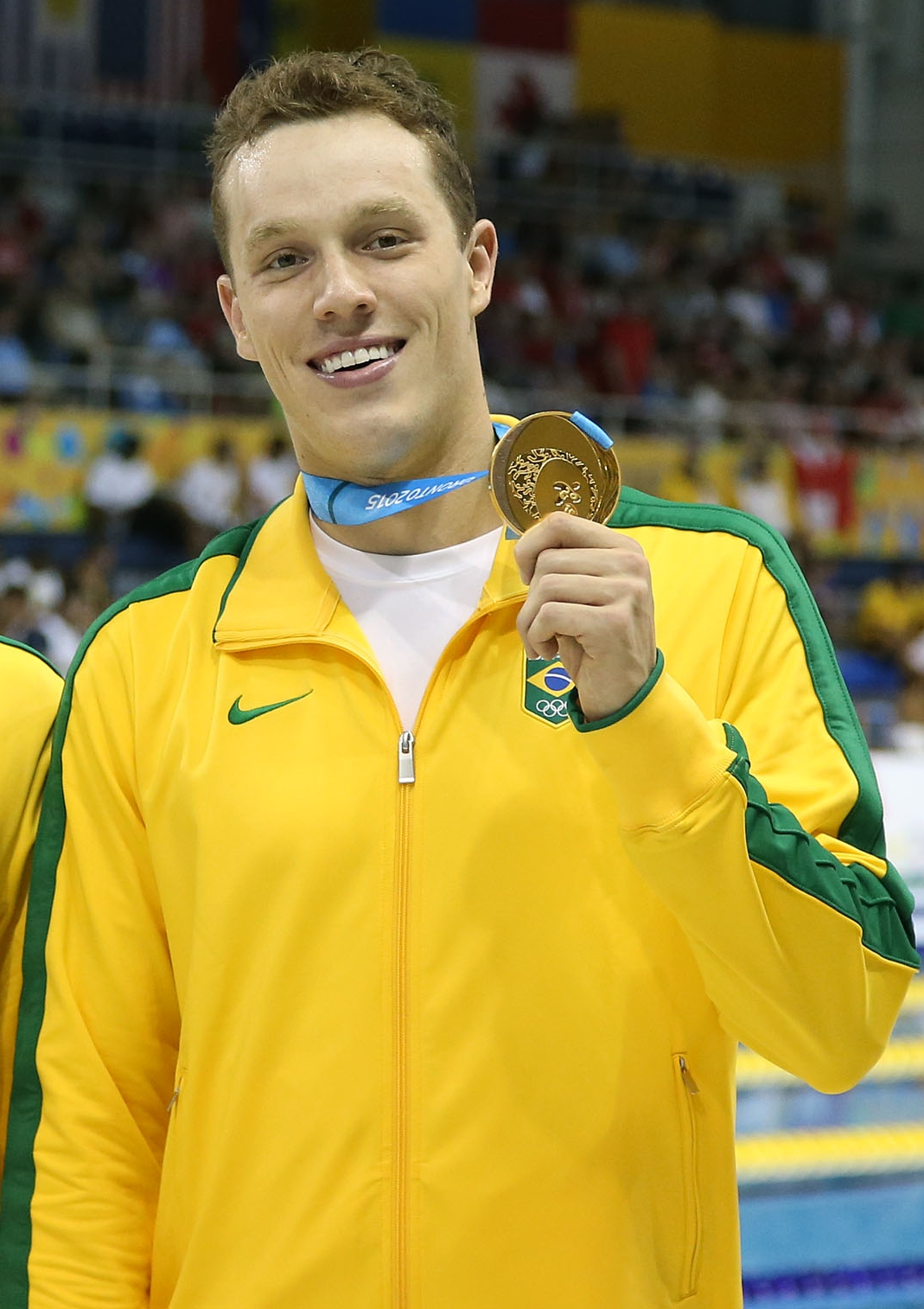

Personal information
- Full name: Henrique Cavalcanti Rodrigues
- National team: Brazil
- Born: 4 February 1991 (age 35) Curitiba, Paraná, Brazil
- Height: 1.94 m (6 ft 4 in)
- Weight: 88 kg (194 lb)

Sport
- Sport: Swimming
- Strokes: Individual medley
Medal record
Men's swimming
Representing Brazil
Pan American Games
Gold medal – first place	2011 Guadalajara	4×100 m freestyle
Gold medal – first place	2015 Toronto	200 m medley
Gold medal – first place	2015 Toronto	4×200 m freestyle
Bronze medal – third place	2011 Guadalajara	200 m medley
World Junior Championships
Bronze medal – third place	2008 Monterrey	4×100 m freestyle

Henrique Cavalcanti Rodrigues (born 4 February 1991) is a Brazilian competitive swimmer.

== International career ==
=== 2008–12 ===
He won the bronze medal in the 4×100-metre freestyle at the 2008 FINA Youth World Swimming Championships in Monterrey.

Participating in 2009 World Aquatics Championships in Rome, Henrique finished 15th in the 200-metre individual medley, and 33rd in the 400-metre individual medley.

At the 2010 Pan Pacific Swimming Championships in Irvine, California, Rodrigues finished 5th in the 200-metre individual medley final. He also finished 14th in the 100-metre freestyle.

At the 2010 FINA World Swimming Championships (25 m) in Dubai, Rodrigues finished 4th in the 200-metre individual medley final, and 8th in the 100-metre individual medley final.

In 2010 he was in the World Military Games in Germany, winning the gold medal in the 200-metre individual medley.

Disputing the 2011 World Aquatics Championships in Shanghai in China, Henrique reached the 200-metre individual medley semifinals, finishing in 14th place.

At the 2011 Pan American Games, Rodrigues won gold in the 4×100-metre freestyle and bronze in the 200-metre individual medley.

=== 2012 Summer Olympics ===
He competed in the 200-metre individual medley at the 2012 Summer Olympics and was eliminated in the semifinals, finishing 13th.

=== 2013–16 ===
At the 2013 World Aquatics Championships, in Barcelona, he finished 12th in the 200-metre individual medley.

At the 2014 FINA World Swimming Championships (25 m) in Doha, Qatar, Rodrigues finished 4th in the Men's 200 metre individual medley, 6th in the Men's 100 metre individual medley (breaking the South American record with a time of 52.20), and 16th in the Men's 200 metre backstroke. He also swam the heats of the Men's 4 × 100 metre freestyle relay.

At the 2015 Pan American Games in Toronto, Ontario, Canada, Rodrigues won the gold medal in the 200-metre individual medley, where he made his personal best with a time of 1:57.06, third best world time in 2015, and new Pan Am Games record. He also won a gold medal in the 4×200-metre freestyle relay, by participating at heats.

At the 2015 World Aquatics Championships in Kazan, Rodrigues reached his first final in the World Championships, finishing in 7th place in the Men's 200 metre individual medley, with a time of 1:58.52. The time he got at the Pan Am Games, a few weeks earlier (1:57.06) would give him the 4th place.

=== 2016 Summer Olympics ===
At the 2016 Summer Olympics, he finished 9th in the Men's 200 metre individual medley.
