= El Salvador at the 2023 World Aquatics Championships =

- Flag of El Salvador
- FINA code: ESA
- National federation: Federación Salvadoreña de Natación

in Fukuoka, Japan
- Competitors: 1 in 1 sport
- Medals: Gold 0 Silver 0 Bronze 0 Total 0

World Aquatics Championships appearances
- 1973; 1975; 1978; 1982; 1986; 1991; 1994; 1998; 2001; 2003; 2005; 2007; 2009; 2011; 2013; 2015; 2017; 2019; 2022; 2023; 2024

El Salvador competed at the 2023 World Aquatics Championships in Fukuoka, Japan from 14 to 30 July.

== Open water swimming ==
El Salvador entered 1 open water swimmer.

Women

Athlete	Event	Time	Rank
Fátima Portillo	Women's 5 km	DNS	
Fátima Portillo	Women's 10 km	DNS	

== Swimming ==
El Salvador entered 2 swimmers.

Men

Athlete	Event	Heat		Semifinal		Final	
Athlete	Event	Time	Rank	Time	Rank	Time	Rank
José Campo	400 metre freestyle	4:15.97	51	—		Did not advance	
José Campo	800 metre freestyle	8:57.60	38	—		Did not advance	

Women

Athlete	Event	Heat		Semifinal		Final	
Athlete	Event	Time	Rank	Time	Rank	Time	Rank
Isabella Alas	100 metre freestyle	1:00.58	48	Did not advance			
Isabella Alas	100 metre butterfly	1:02.85	39	Did not advance			
