= Swimming at the 2015 Pan American Games – Men's 200 metre individual medley =

Men's 200 metre individual medley at the 2015 Pan American Games
- Venue: CIBC Pan Am/Parapan Am Aquatics Centre and Field House
- Dates: July 18 (preliminaries and finals)
- Competitors: 20 from 15 nations
- Winning time: 1:57.06

Medalists
Gold medal	Henrique Rodrigues	Brazil
Silver medal	Thiago Pereira	Brazil
Bronze medal	Joseph Bentz	United States

The men's 200 metre individual medley competition of the swimming events at the 2015 Pan American Games took place on July 18 at the CIBC Pan Am/Parapan Am Aquatics Centre and Field House in Toronto, Canada. The defending Pan American Games champion was Thiago Pereira of Brazil.

This race consisted of four lengths of the pool, each swum in a different stroke. All participating swimmers would take part in 3 heats based on qualifying time. The 8 fastest swimmers would advance to the final.

== Records ==
Prior to this competition, the existing world and Pan American Games records were as follows:

World record	Ryan Lochte (USA)	1:54.00	Shanghai, China	July 28, 2011
Pan American Games record	Thiago Pereira (BRA)	1:57.79	Rio de Janeiro, Brazil	July 20, 2007

The following new records were set during this competition.

Date	Event	Name	Nationality	Time	Record
18 July	A Final	Henrique Rodrigues	Brazil	1:57.06	GR

== Qualification ==
Each National Olympic Committee (NOC) was able to enter up to two entrants providing they had met the A standard (2:07.29) in the qualifying period (January 1, 2014 to May 1, 2015). NOCs were also permitted to enter one athlete providing they had met the B standard (2:14.93) in the same qualifying period. All other competing athletes were entered as universality spots.

== Schedule ==
All times are Eastern Time Zone (UTC-4).

Date	Time	Round
July 18, 2015	10:32	Heats
July 18, 2015	19:39	Final B
July 18, 2015	19:46	Final A

== Results ==
KEY:	q	Fastest non-qualifiers	Q	Qualified	GR	Games record	NR	National record	PB	Personal best	SB	Seasonal best

=== Heats ===
The first round was held on July 18.

Rank	Heat	Lane	Name	Nationality	Time	Notes
1	2	4	Henrique Rodrigues	Brazil	1:59.91	QA
2	2	5	Ty Stewart	United States	2:00.25	QA
3	1	4	Gunnar Bentz	United States	2:01.26	QA
4	1	5	Luke Reilly	Canada	2:01.42	QA
5	3	4	Thiago Pereira	Brazil	2:01.68	QA
6	3	5	Evan White	Canada	2:02.43	QA
7	2	3	Carlos Omaña	Venezuela	2:02.92	QA
8	3	3	Omar Pinzón	Colombia	2:02.94	QA
9	1	6	Jose Martinez	Mexico	2:03.30	QB
10	2	6	Rafael Alfaro	El Salvador	2:03.89	QB
11	3	6	Juan Sequera	Venezuela	2:04.51	QB
12	3	2	Matías López	Paraguay	2:05.09	QB, NR
13	1	3	Ezequiel Trujillo	Mexico	2:05.69	QB
14	2	2	Esteban Paz	Argentina	2:07.55	QB
15	2	7	Felipe Quiroz	Chile	2:08.04	QB
16	1	2	Luis Vega	Cuba	2:08.09	QB
17	3	1	Esteban Araya	Costa Rica	2:09.14	
18	3	7	Jordy Groters	Aruba	2:11.55	
19	2	1	Christopher Courtis	Barbados	2:12.33	
20	1	7	Jean Monteagudo	Peru	2:13.24	

=== B Final ===
The B final was also held on July 18.

Rank	Lane	Name	Nationality	Time	Notes
9	5	Rafael Alfaro	El Salvador	2:02.55	
10	4	Jose Martinez	Mexico	2:02.95	
11	2	Ezequiel Trujillo	Mexico	2:04.83	
12	3	Juan Sequera	Venezuela	2:04.85	
13	6	Matías López	Paraguay	2:04.94	NR
14	7	Esteban Paz	Argentina	2:06.52	
15	8	Luis Vega	Cuba	2:07.31	
16	1	Felipe Quiroz	Chile	2:08.87	

=== A Final ===
The A final was also held on July 18.

Rank	Lane	Name	Nationality	Time	Notes
1st place, gold medalist(s)	4	Henrique Rodrigues	Brazil	1:57.06	GR
2nd place, silver medalist(s)	2	Thiago Pereira	Brazil	1:57.42	
3rd place, bronze medalist(s)	3	Gunnar Bentz	United States	2:00.04	
4	7	Evan White	Canada	2:00.60	
5	5	Ty Stewart	United States	2:01.83	
6	6	Luke Reilly	Canada	2:02.01	
7	8	Omar Pinzón	Colombia	2:02.98	
8	1	Carlos Omaña	Venezuela	2:03.02	
