= El Salvador at the 2013 World Aquatics Championships =

- Flag of El Salvador
- FINA code: ESA
- National federation: Federacíon Salvadoreña de Natacíon

in Barcelona, Spain
- Competitors: 3 in 1 sports
- Medals: Gold 0 Silver 0 Bronze 0 Total 0

World Aquatics Championships appearances
- 1973; 1975; 1978; 1982; 1986; 1991; 1994; 1998; 2001; 2003; 2005; 2007; 2009; 2011; 2013; 2015; 2017; 2019; 2022; 2023; 2024

El Salvador competed at the 2013 World Aquatics Championships in Barcelona, Spain between 19 July and 4 August 2013.

== Swimming ==
Salvadoran swimmers achieved qualifying standards in the following events (up to a maximum of 2 swimmers in each event at the A-standard entry time, and 1 at the B-standard):

Men

Athlete	Event	Heat		Semifinal		Final	
Athlete	Event	Time	Rank	Time	Rank	Time	Rank
Marcelo Acosta	400 m freestyle	4:02.21	39	—		did not advance	
Marcelo Acosta	800 m freestyle	8:17.39	29	—		did not advance	
Rodrigo Suriano	50 m freestyle	24.32	58	did not advance			
Rodrigo Suriano	100 m backstroke	1:00.79	44	did not advance			

Women

Athlete	Event	Heat		Semifinal		Final	
Athlete	Event	Time	Rank	Time	Rank	Time	Rank
Pamela Benitez	100 m freestyle	58.16	48	did not advance			
Pamela Benitez	200 m freestyle	2:05.43	35	did not advance			
