= Lilian Castro =

Salvadoran sports shooter

Personal information
- Born: 19 December 1986 (age 39)
- Height: 164 cm (5 ft 5 in)
- Weight: 63 kg (139 lb)

Sport
- Sport: Sports shooting
Medal record
Women's shooting
Representing El Salvador
Pan American Games
Bronze medal – third place	2015 Toronto	10m air pistol

Lilian Castro (born 19 December 1986) is a Salvadoran sports shooter. She competed in the women's 10 metre air pistol event at the 2016 Summer Olympics. She finished 44th in the qualifying round, and therefore did not progress to the finals. Castro was the flag-bearer for El Salvador in the Parade of Nations.

Olympic Games
Preceded by Evelyn García	Flag bearer for El Salvador; Rio de Janeiro 2016	Succeeded by Celina Márquez; Enrique Arathoon
