= 2014 FINA World Swimming Championships (25 m) – Men's 200 metre backstroke =

Men's 200 metre backstroke at the 2014 FINA World Swimming Championships (25 m)
- Dates: 7 December
- Competitors: 59 from 45 nations
- Winning time: 1:47.38

Medalists
gold medal	Radosław Kawęcki	Poland
silver medal	Ryan Lochte	United States
bronze medal	Mitch Larkin	Australia

The Men's 200 metre backstroke competition of the 2014 FINA World Swimming Championships (25 m) will be held on 7 December.

== Records ==
Prior to the competition, the existing world and championship records were as follows.

	Name	Nation	Time	Location	Date
World record	Arkady Vyatchanin	Russia	1:46.11	Berlin	15 November 2009
Championship record	Ryan Lochte	United States	1:46.68	Dubai	19 December 2010

== Results ==
=== Heats ===
The heats were held at 09:38.

Rank	Heat	Lane	Name	Nationality	Time	Notes
1	5	5	Ryosuke Irie	Japan	1:49.57	Q, AS
2	6	3	Tyler Clary	United States	1:50.05	Q
3	6	0	Ryan Lochte	United States	1:50.35	Q
4	5	2	David Gamburg	Israel	1:50.83	Q
4	6	4	Yuki Shirai	Japan	1:50.83	Q
6	7	4	Mitch Larkin	Australia	1:51.11	Q
7	6	8	Omar Pinzón	Colombia	1:51.29	Q,
8	7	6	Radosław Kawęcki	Poland	1:51.44	Q
9	5	3	Danas Rapšys	Lithuania	1:51.59	
10	7	3	Yakov Toumarkin	Israel	1:51.86	
11	5	4	Christian Diener	Germany	1:51.89	
12	6	5	Péter Bernek	Hungary	1:52.70	
13	7	7	Russell Wood	Canada	1:53.49	
14	5	7	Gábor Balog	Hungary	1:53.54	
15	6	6	Lukas Rauftlin	Switzerland	1:53.68	
16	5	0	Henrique Rodrigues	Brazil	1:54.05	
17	5	8	Ricky Ellis	South Africa	1:54.22	
18	6	7	Federico Turrini	Italy	1:54.47	
19	5	9	Apostolos Christou	Greece	1:54.70	
20	6	1	Simone Sabbioni	Italy	1:54.80	
21	4	5	Robert Glință	Romania	1:55.32	
22	7	8	David Kunčar	Czech Republic	1:55.69	
23	4	6	Lavrans Solli	Norway	1:56.01	
24	5	6	Fernando Santos	Brazil	1:56.23	
25	7	1	Martin Zhelev	Bulgaria	1:56.37	
26	7	2	Marko Krce Rabar	Croatia	1:56.73	
27	5	1	Roman Dmytrijev	Czech Republic	1:58.04	
28	4	8	Jérémy Desplanches	Switzerland	1:58.54	
29	3	6	Boris Kirillov	Azerbaijan	1:58.74	
30	7	0	Stephanus Coetzer	South Africa	1:58.97	
31	3	1	Ryan Pini	Papua New Guinea	1:59.37	
32	4	2	Lau Shiu Yue	Hong Kong	1:59.77	
33	4	9	David Adalsteinsson	Iceland	2:00.07	
34	4	1	Lin Shih-chieh	Chinese Taipei	2:00.52	
35	6	9	Matias López	Paraguay	2:01.39	
36	4	7	Armando Barrera	Cuba	2:01.46	
37	3	7	Grigorii Kalminskii	Azerbaijan	2:02.17	
38	4	0	Daniil Bukin	Uzbekistan	2:02.29	
39	3	2	Andres Olvera	Mexico	2:02.37	
40	4	4	Kristinn Þórarinsson	Iceland	2:03.17	
41	3	4	Gorazd Chepishevski	Macedonia	2:03.28	
42	3	8	Jamal Chavoshifar	Iran	2:03.39	
43	3	3	Driss Lahrichi	Morocco	2:03.50	
44	3	5	Lushano Lamprecht	Namibia	2:03.65	
45	2	3	Rodrigo Suriano	El Salvador	2:04.58	
46	7	9	Jiang Tiansheng	China	2:07.40	
47	4	3	Xiao Lei	China	2:07.47	
48	3	9	Yaaqoub Al-Saadi	United Arab Emirates	2:08.86	
49	2	5	Soroush Ghandchi	Iran	2:09.41	
50	2	6	Maroun Waked	Lebanon	2:10.09	
51	3	0	Patrick Groters	Aruba	2:10.89	
52	2	2	Cristian Santi	San Marino	2:11.24	
53	2	4	Noah Al-Khulaifi	Qatar	2:14.81	
54	1	4	Nathan Nades	Papua New Guinea	2:21.98	
55	2	7	Dean Hoffman	Seychelles	2:24.88	
56	2	1	Temaruata Strickland	Cook Islands	2:25.03	
57	2	8	Aleksander Ngresi	Albania	2:26.02	
58	1	5	Htut Ahnt Khaung	Myanmar	2:29.68	
59	1	3	Tanner Poppe	Guam	2:40.53	
—	6	2	Travis Mahoney	Australia		DNS
—	7	5	Benjamin Stasiulis	France		DNS

=== Final ===
The final was held at 18:15.

Rank	Lane	Name	Nationality	Time	Notes
1st place, gold medalist(s)	8	Radosław Kawęcki	Poland	1:47.38	
2nd place, silver medalist(s)	3	Ryan Lochte	United States	1:48.20	
3rd place, bronze medalist(s)	7	Mitch Larkin	Australia	1:48.35	
4	4	Ryosuke Irie	Japan	1:48.77	AS
5	5	Tyler Clary	United States	1:49.87	
6	1	Omar Pinzón	Colombia	1:50.88	SA
7	2	Yuki Shirai	Japan	1:51.67	
8	6	David Gamburg	Israel	1:52.24	
