= Francisco Suriano =

Salvadoran swimmer (born 1978)

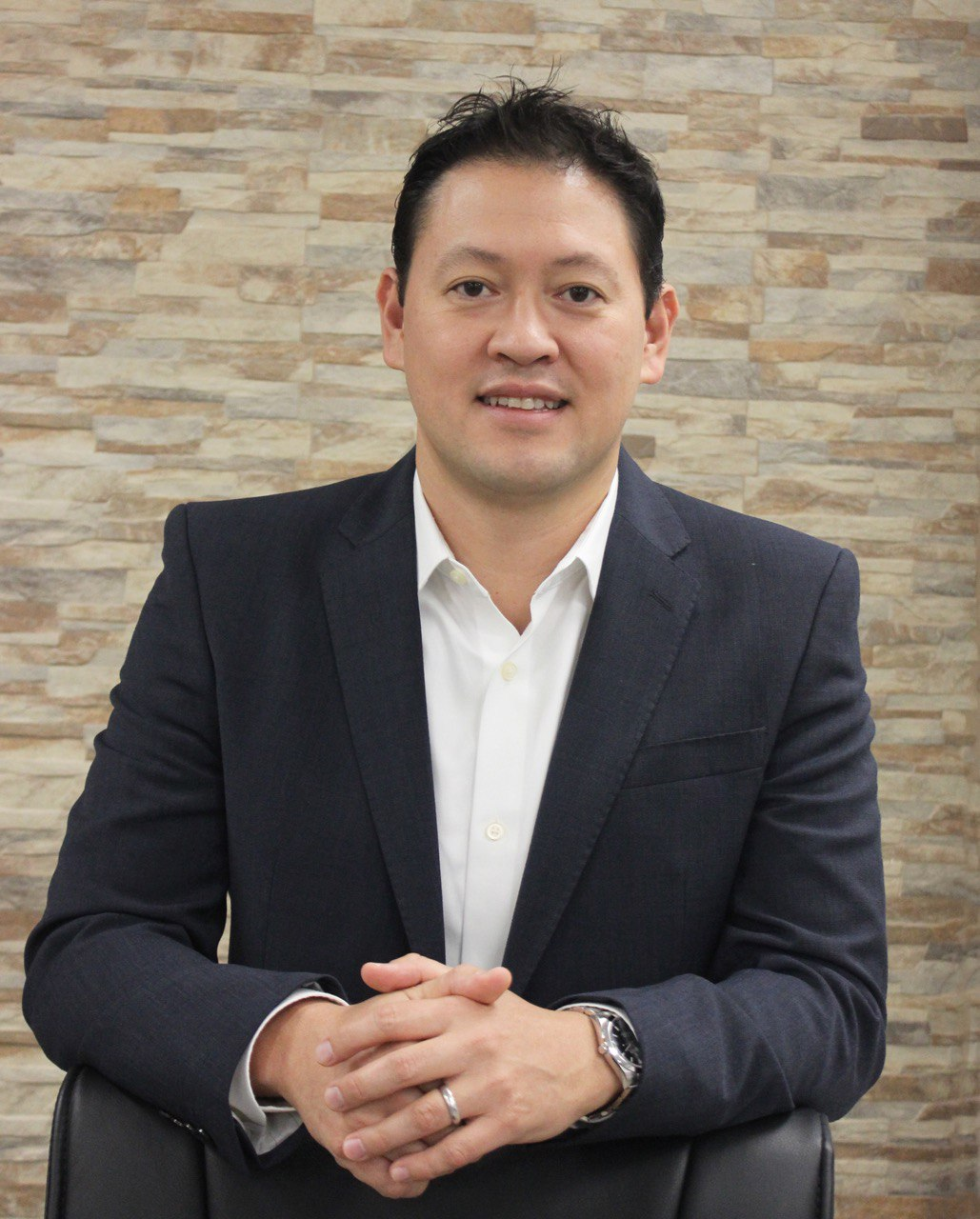
- Suriano around age 44, circa 2021

Personal information
- Full name: Francisco Suriano Sui Chon Him III
- National team: El Salvador
- Born: 21 July 1978 (age 48) San Salvador
- Height: 180 cm (5 ft 11 in)
- Weight: 74 kg (163 lb)

Sport
- Sport: Swimming
- Strokes: Breaststroke
- College team: University of Michigan
- Coach: Jon Urbanchek (U. Michigan)
Medal record
Representing El Salvador
Central American and Caribbean Games
Gold medal – first place	2002 San Salvador	100m breaststroke
Gold medal – first place	2002 San Salvador	200m breaststroke

Francisco Suriano Sui III (born 21 July 1978) is an Olympic breaststroke swimmer from El Salvador who competed for the University of Michigan. He was only 17 when he represented his country at the 1996 Summer Olympics in Atlanta, and was the youngest of his country's team of 8 athletes who participated at the Olympics that year, competing in the 100 and 200 meter breaststroke. He also competed in the 2000 Summer Olympics for El Salvador in Sydney, Australia, where he again competed in the 100 and 200 meter breaststroke events. He later worked as an Executive for Grupo Ferromax, a metal working and construction company headquartered in San Salvador.

Francisco Suriano was born 21 July 1978 in San Salvador, El Salvador, and attended Academia Britanica Cuscatleca high school.

== University of Michigan ==
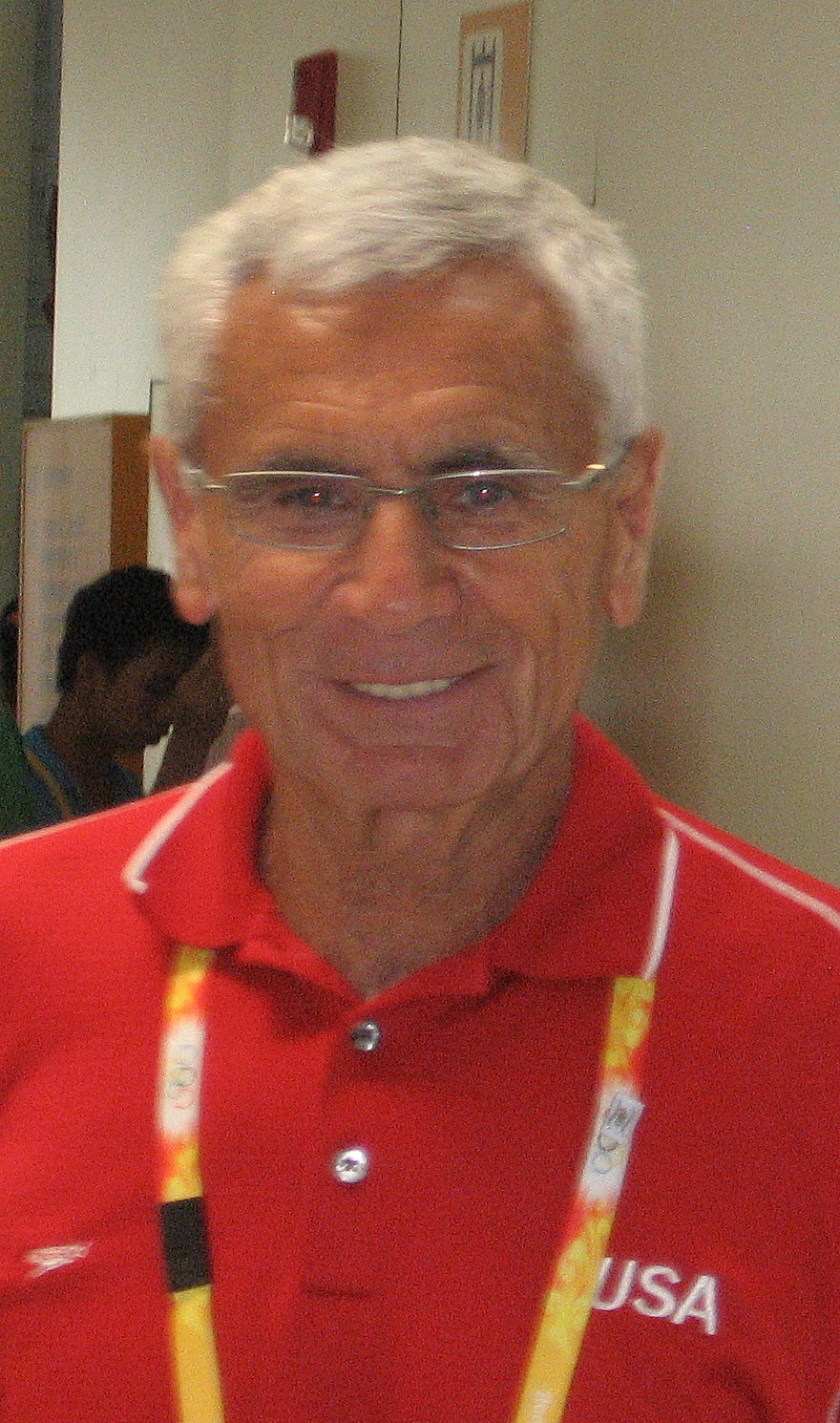
Coach Urbanchek, 2008

Francisco Suriano enrolled at the University of Michigan in 1996 and swam for the NCAA Division I Michigan Wolverines beginning in the 1996–97 season through the 1999–2000 season. He swam under Head Coach Jon Urbanchek, specializing in the 100 and 200-yard breaststroke, and competed in the breaststroke in medley relays. Coach Urbanchek had competed for Michigan in college and coached the team continuously from 1982-2004. Urbanchek served as an Assistant U.S. Olympic coach five times.

Competing with a very strong Michigan team, Suriano swam with four U. Michigan swimmers who competed for America in the 1996 Atlanta games, that included Tom Dolan, Tom Malchow, Eric Wunderlich, and Erik Namesnik. Like Suriano, three more of his U. Michigan team mates competed in the 1996 Atlanta Olympics for other countries, including Brazil's Gustavo Borges, the Philippines's Ryan Papa the Netherlands's Marcel Wouda, and Turkey's Derya Buyukuncu.

== Olympics ==
Suriano competed in the at the 1996 Atlanta Olympics for El Salvador placing 37th in the 100 meter breaststroke with a time of 1:05.82, and in the 200 meter breaststroke placing 33rd with a time of 2:25.57. At the 2000 Sydney Olympics, again competing for his native El Salvador, he swam 37th in the 100 meter breaststroke with a time of 1:04.31 and 35th in the 200 meter breaststroke with a time of 2:20.10.

=== International highlights ===
He competed at the Central American and Caribbean Games in 1998 in Maracaibo, Venezuela winning a silver medal in both 100 meter and 200 meter breaststroke competitions. He later won gold medals in both his signature event, the 100 and 200 meter breaststroke at the 2002 Central American and Caribbean Games in his native San Salvador.

Though he did not medal, on April 3-6, 2002 Suriano competed in the 2002 FINA World Championships in Russia in the 50 meter breaststroke swimming a 29.70, in the 100 meter breaststroke swimming a 1:03.24, and in the 200 meter breaststroke swimming a 2:18.78, with both times considered personal bests. At the age of 25, he swam representing El Salvador in the 2003 World Championships in Spain in the 50 meter breaststroke placing 46th, the 100 meter breaststroke placing 49th, and the 200 meter breaststroke placing 39th.

In the Pan American Games on August 15, 2003 in the Dominican Republic, he won a silver medal in the 200-meter breaststroke with a time of 2:22.64.

To summarize, he swam for El Salvador at the:

- Olympics: 1996, 2000
- World Championships: 2002, 2003
- Pan American Games: 2003

== Careers ==
In career pursuits, Francisco Suriano III has served as an executive and Vice-President at Grupo Ferromax, a metal working company headquartered in his native San Salador, El Salvador. The company in addition to metal work, manufactured construction materials. Grupo Ferromax was founded by Francisco's father Francisco Suriano . In 1985, Francisco's father, Francisco Suriano Siú founded Galvanissa, which is now a part of Grupo Ferromax, and has sales in the Central American countries of El Salvador, Costa Rica, Nicaragua, Honduras, and Guatamala.
