= Fredy Torres =

Salvadoran judoka

Personal information
- Full name: Fredy Fernando Torres Portillo
- Nationality: Salvadoran
- Born: 10 May 1962
- Died: 21 February 1993 (aged 30) San Salvador

Sport
- Sport: Judo

Fredy Fernando Torres Portillo (10 May 1962 – 21 February 1993) was a Salvadoran judoka. He competed at the 1984 Summer Olympics and the 1988 Summer Olympics. On 21 February 1993, Torres was assassinated in Parque Libertad in San Salvador: he had been threatened by the Death Squads.
