= Rubén Piñeda =

Salvadoran swimmer (born 1974)

Personal information
- Born: 11 April 1974 (age 52)

Sport
- Sport: Swimming

Rubén Piñeda (born 11 April 1974) is a Salvadoran swimmer. He competed in the men's 100 metre butterfly event at the 1996 Summer Olympics.
