= Mario Wilfredo Contreras =

Salvadoran cyclist (born 1987)

Personal information
- Born: 22 May 1987 (age 39) Santa Ana, El Salvador
- Height: 1.74 m (5 ft 8 1/2 in)
- Weight: 64 kg (141 lb)

Cycling career
- Sport: Cycling
- Discipline: Road cycling
- Role: Rider

Mario Wilfredo Contreras (born May 22, 1987 in Santa Ana) is a Salvadoran road racing cyclist. He represented El Salvador at the 2008 Summer Olympics in Beijing, where he competed for the men's road race. In a field of 142 riders who had qualified for that event, only 89 completed the race. Contreras was one of the riders who did not finish the race.

== Career achievements ==
2007
2nd Stage 2 Vuelta Ciclista a Talavera, Juniors, Casar Talavera (ESP)
2009
1st National Championship, Road, ITT, Elite, El Salvador (ESA)
5th General Classification Vuelta a Nicaragua (NIC)
2010
1st National Championship, Road, ITT, Elite, El Salvador, Cd. Arce (ESA)
3rd National Championship, Road, Elite, El Salvador, Olocuilta (ESA)
