= Camila Vargas Palomo =

Salvadorian rower

Personal information
- Born: 22 September 1986 (age 39) Falcón, Venezuela

Sport
- Sport: Rowing
Medal record
Representing El Salvador
Pan American Games
Bronze medal – third place	2007 Rio de Janeiro	Single sculls

Camila Vargas Palomo (born 22 September 1986) is a Salvadoran rower. She competed in the single sculls race at the 2008 and 2012 Summer Olympics. At the 2008 Olympics she finished in 22nd place, while at the 2012 Summer Olympics she placed 4th in Final C, ranking 16th overall.
