= Enrique Arathoon =

Salvadoran sailor (born 1992)

Personal information
- Full name: Enrique José Arathoon Pacas
- Born: 18 January 1992 (age 34) Guatemala City, Guatemala

Sport
- Country: El Salvador
- Sport: Sailing
- College team: College of Charleston Cougars

Enrique José Arathoon Pacas (born 18 January 1992) is a Salvadoran competitive sailor. He competed at the 2016 Summer Olympics in Rio de Janeiro, in the men's Laser class.

He represented El Salvador at the 2020 Summer Olympics in the same event.

Olympic Games
Preceded by Lilian Castro	Flag bearer for El Salvador; Tokyo 2020 with Celina Márquez	Succeeded by Uriel Canjura; Celina Márquez
