= Nixon Hernández =

Salvadoran swimmer (born 1997)

Personal information
- Born: 8 October 1997 (age 28)

Sport
- Sport: Swimming

Nixon Hernández (born 8 October 1997) is a Salvadoran swimmer. In 2019, he represented El Salvador at the 2019 World Aquatics Championships held in Gwangju, South Korea and he finished in 74th place in the heats in the men's 50 metre freestyle event. In the men's 100 metre freestyle he finished in 84th place in the heats.

In 2018, he competed in the men's 50 metre freestyle and men's 100 metre freestyle events at the 2018 FINA World Swimming Championships (25 m) held in Hangzhou, China.
