= Juan Vargas (judoka) =

Salvadoran judoka

Personal information
- Nationality: Salvadoran
- Born: 31 July 1963 (age 61)

Sport
- Sport: Judo

Juan Vargas (born 31 July 1963) is a Salvadoran judoka. He competed at the 1984, 1992 and the 1996 Summer Olympics in the men's lightweight division, and was placed 9th, 13th and 21st respectively.

Olympic Games
Preceded by María José Marenco	Flag bearer for El Salvador; Atlanta 1996	Succeeded by Eva Dimas
