= Celina Márquez =

Salvadoran swimmer (born 1999)

Personal information
- Full name: Carmen Celina Márquez Orellana
- Nationality: Salvadoran
- Born: 16 July 1999 (age 26) San Salvador
- Height: 174 cm (5 ft 9 in)

Sport
- Sport: Swimming
- Strokes: Backstroke
- College team: Nova Southeastern Sharks

Carmen Celina Márquez Orellana (born 16 July 1999) is a Salvadoran swimmer. She competed at the 2020 and 2024 Summer Olympics and was a flag bearer in the opening ceremony at both. She swam for both the Oklahoma Baptist Bison and the Nova Southeastern Sharks.

== Career ==
Márquez began swimming at three years old.

Márquez represented El Salvador at the 2014 Summer Youth Olympics after winning events at the 2014 Central American and Mexican Swimming Championship, finishing 27th in the 200 metre backstroke and 23rd at the 50 metre butterfly. At the 2016 FINA World Swimming Championships (25 m), she set a national record in the 50 metre backstroke with a time of 28.81 and tied for 40th place. She also set a national record in the 200 metre backstroke with a time of 2:18.89 and finished 32nd. She competed at the 2017 World Aquatics Championships, finishing 45th in the 50 metre backstroke and 30th in the 200 metre backstroke.

At the 2019 Pan American Games, Márquez set a national record in the heats of the 100 metre backstroke and advanced into the final, where she finished seventh. She also set a national record in the 200 metre backstroke. She also competed at the 2019 World Aquatics Championships, finishing 38th in the 100 metre backstroke and 42nd in the 100 metre butterfly.

Márquez competed at the 2020 Summer Olympics. She and compatriot sailor Enrique Arathoon were named El Salvador's flag bearers for the opening ceremony. She placed 36th in the 100 metre backstroke and 23rd in the 200 metre backstroke. At the 2023 Pan American Games, she finished 16th in the 100 metre backstroke and 13th in the 200 metre backstroke.

At the 2024 World Aquatics Championships, Márquez finished 32nd in the 100 metre backstroke and 24th in the 200 metre backstroke. She qualified to represent El Salvador at the 2024 Summer Olympics in the 100 metre backstroke and was once again a flag bearer in the opening ceremony. She finished 32nd in the heats with a time of 1:04.55.

Olympic Games
| Preceded by Lilian Castro | Flag bearer for El Salvador; Tokyo 2020 with Enrique Arathoon; Paris 2024 with Uriel Canjura | Succeeded by Incumbent |
