= Rafael Alfaro =

Salvadoran swimmer (born 1992)

Personal information
- Full name: Rafael Alfaro Ferracuti
- Born: February 4, 1992 (age 34) San Salvador, El Salvador

Sport
- Sport: Swimming

Rafael Alfaro Ferracuti (born 4 February 1992) is a Salvadoran swimmer who competed in the men's 400m individual medley. At the 2012 Summer Olympics he finished 35th overall in the heats in the men's 400-metre individual medley.

He also competed at the 2015 Pan American Games.

As of January 2025, he holds the Salvadoran record in the men's 50 m breaststroke, 100 m breaststroke (short course) and 200 m breaststroke, 200 m and 400 m medley (long course).

He is the nephew of Piero Ferracuti, who also competed for El Salvador in two swimming events at the 1972 Summer Olympics. He attended Brigham Young University and swam for their colleagiate swimming team.
