= Evelyn García =

Salvadoran cyclist (born 1982)

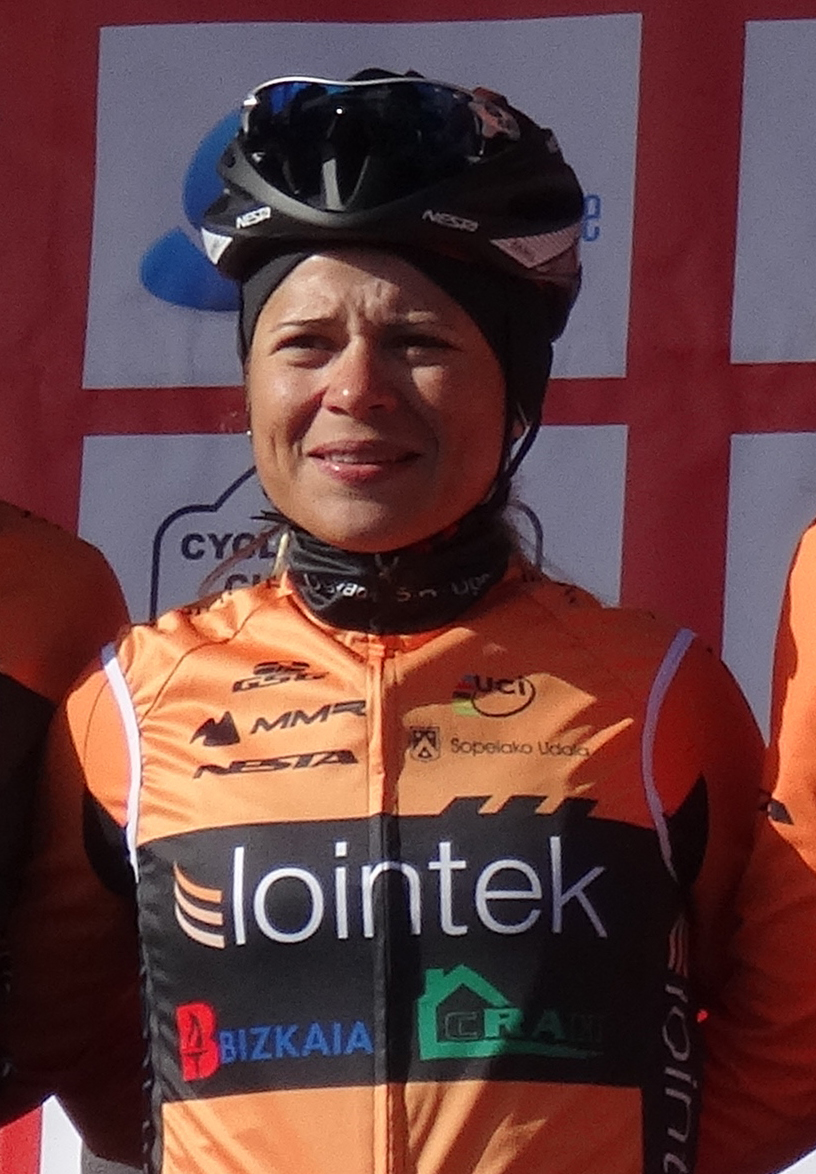
- García in 2015

Personal information
- Full name: Evelyn Yesenia García Marroquín
- Born: 29 December 1982 (age 43) Santa Ana, El Salvador
- Height: 1.63 m (5 ft 4 in)
- Weight: 54 kg (119 lb)

Cycling career
- Sport: Cycling
- Disciplines: Road; Track
- Role: Rider

Professional teams
- 2005–2006: Nobili Rubinetterie–Menikini Cogeas
- 2007: Team Cmax Dilà–Guerciotti–Cogeas
- 2008: USC Chirio Forno d'Asolo
- 2009: Fenixs
- 2012: Be Pink
- 2013: Pasta Zara–Cogeas
- 2015: Lointek
Medal record
Representing El Salvador
Women's road cycling
Pan American Games
Silver medal – second place	2011 Guadalajara	Time trial
Bronze medal – third place	2015 Toronto	Time trial
Pan American Championships
Silver medal – second place	2011 Medellín	Road race
Central American and Caribbean Games
Silver medal – second place	2010 Mayagüez	Time trial
Bronze medal – third place	2002 San Salvador	Time trial
Women's track cycling
Central American and Caribbean Games
Silver medal – second place	2002 San Salvador	Points race
Bronze medal – third place	2002 San Salvador	Scratch
Bronze medal – third place	2002 San Salvador	Individual pursuit

Evelyn Yesenia García Marroquín (born 29 December 1982) is a Salvadoran cycle racer, who specialises as an all-rounder, having won time-trials and mountain stages in the past. She has won the Vuelta a El Salvador on two occasions, the only woman to do so, in 2004 and 2007.

Born in Santa Ana, García competed in the Summer Olympic Games in 2004 and 2008, both times in the road race and the track individual pursuit. She also competed at the 2012 Summer Olympics in the road race, finishing 26th.

== Major results ==
2002
Central American and Caribbean Games

3rd Individual pursuit
3rd Scratch
3rd Time trial

2003
UCI B World Championships

2nd Individual pursuit
2nd Time trial

2004
1st Overall Vuelta a El Salvador

1st Prologue, Stages 1, 2 & 3

2005
2nd Overall Vuelta a El Salvador
2006
National Road Championships

1st Road race
1st Time trial

7th Overall Vuelta a El Salvador

1st Stage 5

2007
UCI B World Championships

1st Individual pursuit
2nd Points race

National Road Championships

1st Road race
1st Time trial

1st Overall Vuelta a El Salvador

1st Stages 3 (ITT), 4, & 5

2nd GP Raiffeisen
Pan American Road Championships

7th Time trial
8th Road race

2008
1st Reyrieux
5th Time trial, Pan American Road Championships
9th Overall Vuelta a El Salvador
2009
National Road Championships

1st Road race
1st Time trial

1st Overall Vuelta Internacional Femenina a Costa Rica

1st Stages 1, 2 & 5

1st Overall Vuelta Femenina a Guatemala

1st Stages 1 & 3

2010
Central American Games

1st Road race
3rd Time trial

National Road Championships

1st Road race
1st Time trial

1st Overall Vuelta Internacional Femenina a Costa Rica
1st Campeonato de Copa III El Salvador
2nd Time trial, Central American and Caribbean Games
2011
National Road Championships

1st Road race
1st Time trial

2nd Time trial, Pan American Games
Pan American Road Championships

2nd Road race
7th Time trial

2012
1st Grand Prix GSB
3rd Overall Vuelta a El Salvador
5th Grand Prix el Salvador
2013
1st Time trial, Central American Games
4th Overall Vuelta Internacional Femenina a Costa Rica

1st Stage 1

4th Grand Prix de Oriente
6th Overall Vuelta a El Salvador
10th Time trial, Pan American Road Championships
2014
5th Time trial, Central American and Caribbean Games
2015
National Road Championships

1st Road race
1st Time trial

3rd Time trial, Pan American Games
6th Overall Vuelta Internacional Femenina a Costa Rica
2016
Pan American Road Championships

4th Time trial
8th Road race

2017
National Road Championships

1st Road race
1st Time trial

Summer Olympics
Preceded by Eva Dimas	Flag bearer for El Salvador; Athens 2004	Succeeded by Eva Dimas
Preceded by Eva Dimas	Flag bearer for El Salvador; London 2012	Succeeded by Lilian Castro
