= Gustavo Manzur =

Salvadoran wrestler

Personal information
- Born: 9 December 1959 (age 65)

Sport
- Sport: Wrestling

Gustavo Manzur Aguilar (born 9 December 1959) is a Salvadoran former wrestler who competed in the 1984 Summer Olympics and in the 1988 Summer Olympics. At the 1987 Pan American Games 68.0 kg. Greco-Roman category he finished sixth and at the 1987 Pan American Games 68.0 kg. freestyle category he finished eighth. At the 1995 Pan American Games 82.0 kg. Greco-Roman category he finished eighth.
