= Eva Dimas =

Salvadoran weightlifter (born 1973)

Personal information
- Full name: Eva María Dimas Fontanals
- Born: 18 March 1973 (age 53) San Salvador, El Salvador
Medal record
Women's weightlifting
Representing El Salvador
Pan American Games
Silver medal – second place	2003 Santo Domingo	– 69 kg
Bronze medal – third place	1999 Winnipeg	– 69 kg
Bronze medal – third place	2007 Rio de Janeiro	– 75 kg
Central American and Caribbean Games
Silver medal – second place	2006 Cartagena	+ 75 kg

Eva María Dimas Fontanals (born 18 March 1973 in San Salvador) is a retired female athlete and weightlifter from El Salvador.

== Biography ==
She competed for her native Central American country in three consecutive Summer Olympics, starting in 2000.

At the 2004 Summer Olympics in Athens, she competed in the women's 75 kilograms weightlifting event, finishing in the 11th place.

Dimas is a niece of Valerio Fontanals. She carried the flag for El Salvador at the opening ceremony of the 2008 Summer Olympics in Beijing, PR China.

Previously Dimas competed as a discus thrower, finishing in 31st place at the 1995 World Championships.

Dimas tested positive for the banned steroid Nandrolone in June 2009 and was banned from competing for two years.

Olympic Games
Preceded by Juan Vargas	Flag bearer for El Salvador; Sydney 2000	Succeeded by Evelyn García
Olympic Games
Preceded by Evelyn García	Flag bearer for El Salvador; Beijing 2008	Succeeded by Evelyn García
