= Maureen Kaila =

Salvadorian cyclist

Personal information
- Full name: Maureen Anne Kaila Vergara
- Born: December 17, 1964 (age 61) San Francisco, California, U.S.

Cycling career
- Sport: Cycling
- Discipline: Road
- Role: Rider

Professional team
- 2001: 800.com
Medal record
Women's cycling
Representing El Salvador
Central American and Caribbean Games
Bronze medal – third place	1998 Maracaibo	Road race (Note: Belem Guerrero originally won the bronze medal in road race, but failed a doping control with Pseudoephedrine.)

Maureen Anne Kaila Vergara (Note: In this Spanish name, the first or paternal surname is Kaila and the second or maternal family name is Vergara.) (born December 17, 1964) is a retired Salvadoran cycle racer who rode for the 800.com team. Her career began in 1990 and ended in 2001. Vergara competed in the road race events in the Summer Olympic Games in 1996 and 2000, finishing in the 5th and 19th position respectively.
