= El Salvador at the 2011 World Aquatics Championships =

Sporting event delegation

Flag of El Salvador

El Salvador competed at the 2011 World Aquatics Championships in Shanghai, China between July 16 and 31, 2011.

== Swimming ==
El Salvador qualified 3 swimmers.

Men

Athlete	Event	Heats		Semifinals		Final	
Athlete	Event	Time	Rank	Time	Rank	Time	Rank
Juan Guerra	Men's 100m Breaststroke	1:05.88	66	did not advance			
Juan Guerra	Men's 200m Breaststroke	2:22.82	45	did not advance			
Rafael Ferracuti	Men's 200m IM	2:09.16	39	did not advance			
Rafael Ferracuti	Men's 400m IM	4:35.84	32			did not advance	

Women

Athlete	Event	Heats		Semifinals		Final	
Athlete	Event	Time	Rank	Time	Rank	Time	Rank
Alexia Benitez	Women's 400m Freestyle	4:22.59	30			did not advance	
Alexia Benitez	Women's 800m Freestyle	9:00.04	27			did not advance	
