= El Salvador Olympic Committee =

National Olympic Committee

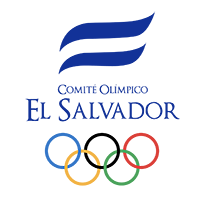
- Country: El Salvador
- Code: ESA
- Created: 1925
- Recognized: 1938
- Headquarters: San Salvador
- President: José Armando Bruni Ochoa
- Secretary General: Roberto Eduardo Calderón
- Website: www.teamesa.org

The El Salvador Olympic Committee (Spanish: Comité Olímpico de El Salvador) (IOC code: ESA) is the National Olympic Committee for El Salvador. It was founded in 1925 and officially recognized by the International Olympic Committee in 1938.

== See also ==
- El Salvador at the Olympics
