= Rick Colella =

American swimmer (born 1951)

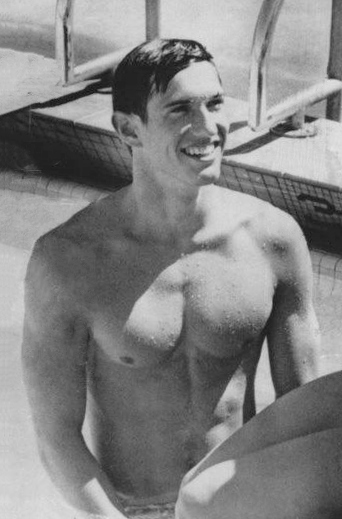
- Colella in 1972

Personal information
- Full name: Richard Phillip Colella, Jr.
- Nickname: "Rick"
- National team: United States
- Born: December 14, 1951 (age 74) Seattle, Washington, U.S.
- Height: 6 ft 1 in (1.85 m)
- Weight: 181 lb (82 kg)
- Spouse: Terry

Sport
- Sport: Swimming
- Strokes: Breaststroke
- Club: Cascade Swim Club; Totem Lake Swim Club
- College team: University of Washington
- Coach: Earl Ellis (U. Washington)
Medal record
Representing the United States
Olympic Games
Bronze medal – third place	1976 Montreal	200 m breaststroke
World Championships (LC)
Gold medal – first place	1975 Cali	4×100 m medley
Silver medal – second place	1975 Cali	200 m breaststroke
Bronze medal – third place	1973 Belgrade	400 m medley
Pan American Games
Gold medal – first place	1971 Cali	200 m breaststroke
Gold medal – first place	1975 Mexico City	100 m breaststroke
Gold medal – first place	1975 Mexico City	200 m breaststroke
Gold medal – first place	1975 Mexico City	4×100 m medley
Silver medal – second place	1975 Mexico City	400 m medley
Bronze medal – third place	1971 Cali	400 m medley
Universiade
Gold medal – first place	1970 Turin	200 m breaststroke
Silver medal – second place	1970 Turin	400 m medley

Richard Phillip Colella, Jr. (born December 14, 1951) is an American former breaststroke swimmer who represented the United States at two consecutive Summer Olympics. In Munich in 1972 he placed fourth in the 200-meter breaststroke final and in Montreal in 1976, he captured a bronze medal in the final of the men's 200-meter breaststroke.

Colella was born December 14, 1951 in Seattle and attended Seattle's Nathan Hale High School where he graduated in 1969. He trained and competed with Seattle's Cascade Swim Club at least by his High School Sophomore year. He attended the 1968 U.S. swimming trials as a high school senior, and though he performed well, he did not qualify for the U.S. Olympic team, placing 16th in the 200-meter breaststroke.

== University of Washington ==
Colella later attended the University of Washington from 1969-1973 where he swam for Head Coach Earl Ellis, who after serving as an Assistant Coach, became Washington's Head Coach from 1969 through 1998. Before retiring, Ellis, an American Swimming Coaches Hall of Fame recipient, would coach seven Olympians, with three earning medals. Before coming to Washington, Ellis coached a year at Seattle's Cascade Swim Club, where Colella had formerly trained. Colella was recruited to Washington by Coach John Tallman, who had begun coaching swimming at Washington in 1962 but completed his time at Washington the year before Colella's tenure with the team. After Collela left the University of Washington, Coach Ellis recruited Olympians Rick DeMont, Doug Northway and Robin Backhaus to Washington, who with the exception of Backhaus, had trained with Sacramento's Arden Hill's swim club, noted for long, high intensity training, a method which had become an important ingredient in Coach Ellis's winning tradition.

When Colella was first recruited and began swimming around 1968, many on the team were from Washington state, and several had swum with Rick's Cascade Swim Club in greater Seattle, or Washington State's Tacoma Swim Club. At Washington, Colella was an All American swimmer all four years, and in 1970 competed in the World Student Games in Italy. In April, 1973, he scored the most individual points at the National AAU Short Course Men's and Women's Swimming Championships with the University of Southern California's Rick Furniss placing second.

In International competition, Colella captured the 200m breaststroke at the 1971 Pan-Am Games and won both breaststroke events at the 1975 Pan-Am Games. He won a gold medal at the FINA World Championships in Columbia in July, 1975 in the 4x100 medley relay.

== 1972, 1976 Olympics ==
Colella finished fourth in the final of the men's 200-meter breaststroke at the 1972 Summer Olympics in Munich, Germany. He was ahead of many in the pack through the first 150-meters but dropped to fourth, lagging behind in the final lap. American John Hencken took the gold, with Colella finishing only .4 seconds behind bronze medalist Nobutaka Taguchi of Japan. At the 1972 Munich Olympics, the U.S. men's team's head coach was the University of Southern California's swim coach Peter Daland.

At the 1976 Summer Olympics in Montreal, Quebec, Collela finished third and received the bronze medal in the 200-meter breaststroke, his signature event. Winning his first Olympic medal, Colella recorded a time of 2:19.20, about two seconds behind American silver medalist John Hencken. Though Hencken led through the first 100 meters, Gold medalist David Wilkie of Great Britain set a demanding pace in the last 100 meters, finishing in a world record time of 2:15.11. In 1976, the U.S. Olympic men's swim team's Head Coach was Indiana University's Dr. James "Doc" Counselman.

=== Post-Olympic life ===
After the 1976 Olympics, Colella worked for Boeing as a flight-operations engineer and pursued other sports including canoeing, running, and Nordic skiing. In 2013, he retired from Boeing. He drifted back to swimming in United States Master's meets at least by 1990 when he realized the sport was easier to sustain with age, and did much of his late life Masters swimming with Puget Sound Masters. He has set 47 records with United States Masters swimming, and his record for the 200-meter breaststroke for 60-64 year olds endured for a particularly long time.

Colella and his wife Terry have raised four children, Elise, Mariel, Brian and Angie. For the past twenty years, the Colellas have dedicated themselves to raising money for research to find a cure for facioscapulohumeral disease (FSHD), a common form of muscular dystrophy that affects their son Brian. They formed FSH Friends, an organization that they run out of their home. They work to raise money and put on an annual auction gala that takes place the beginning of February. They've also co-sponsored local workshops, bringing researchers together from around the world, to help move the research forward.

=== Honors ===
Collela is a member of the International Swimming Hall of Fame. Colella's sister Lynn was also an Olympic swimmer. In 1971 Richard and Lynn won the Seattle Post-Intelligencer Man of the Year award. In 2008, Colella received the David Yorzyk memorial award from United States Masters Swimming. Collela was a Seattle Public High School Athletic Hall of Fame inductee.

== See also ==
- List of Olympic medalists in swimming (men)
- List of University of Washington people
- List of World Aquatics Championships medalists in swimming (men)
