= Barbara Mitchell (swimmer) =

American swimmer (born 1956)

Personal information
- Full name: Barbara Anne Mitchell
- National team: United States
- Born: June 26, 1956 (age 70) Seattle, Washington, U.S.
- Height: 5 ft 8 in (1.73 m)
- Weight: 126 lb (57 kg)

Sport
- Sport: Swimming
- Events: 200-meter Breaststroke; 200, 400 Individual Medley
- Strokes: Breaststroke; Individual Medley
- Club: Triton Swim Club, Seattle; Tacoma Swim Club
- College team: University of Hawaii
- Coach: Earl Ellis (Triton SC) 1960's Dick Hannula (Tacoma SC); Brian Lee (U. of Hawaii)

Barbara Anne Mitchell (born June 4, 1956) is an American former competition swimmer, who competed for the University of Hawaii, and represented the United States as a 16-year-old at the August, 1972 Summer Olympics in the 200 meter breaststroke in Munich, Germany.

== Early swimming ==
Mitchell was born June 4, 1956 in Seattle, Washington, and attended greater Seattle's Highline High School in Burien, Washington, where she won the State Swimming Championship in the 100-yard breaststroke each year she attended.

=== Triton swim club ===
Swimming with greater Seattle's Triton Swim Club in March 26-27, 1966, at the age of 9 she placed third in the 100 freestyle with a time of 1:14.4 at the Daffodil Swim Meet in Tacoma. On April 17, 1966, she again swam with greater Seattle's Triton club, also known as the Red Shield Triton Club, and helped the team place first at the North Spokane Kiwanis Swim Meet by winning the 50 freestyle event in a time of 34.8. A year later in April 1967, at the age of ten she again competed for the Triton Club at the Junior Olympics in Puyallup, and won the 50 breaststroke with a time of 41.1. At 12, in August, 1968, while swimming for the Triton Club, she won the 100 meter breaststroke at the Northwest AAU Open Age Group and Senior Championships with a time of 1:30.3. At the Triton Swim Club, she was coached by Hall of Fame Coach Earl Ellis who was head coach for the Triton Club in 1967-1973, and began coaching swimming at the University of Washington simultaneously in 1968. Ellis, though primarily a distance freestyler, was particularly skilled in teaching the breast and butterfly stroke, and had competed himself in the Individual Medley during college at the University of Iowa. He swam for Hall of Fame Head Coach David Alvin Armbruster Sr. while competing at Iowa, who was known as a stroke specialist in both breast and butterfly strokes. One of Ellis's outstanding swimmers at the Triton Club was Olympian Jack Horsley who captured a bronze in the 1968 Olympics and swam for the Tritons during some of the same years as Mitchell.

=== Tacoma swim club ===
By 14, she swam for the strong Tacoma Swim Club team, about 28 miles South of her hometown in Seattle, where she competed and trained for Hall of Fame Coach Dick Hannula. Hannula founded the team in 1955, and would coach both national champions and Olympians at the Tacoma Swim Club including 1968 Olympian Kaye Hall who swam with Mitchell in a few meets. By Senior High School, Mitchell recognized her most outstanding events were the 100 and 200-meter breaststroke. Swimming for the Tacoma Club at 14, she swam a fourth place in the Women's 200 Individual Medley at the Pacific Northwest AAU Championship in January 1971. Continuing to improve on her time in July 1971, she swam the 100-meter breaststroke in a time of 1:22.77 at the Santa Clara Invitational. At the National AAU Swimming Championships in Houston in August 1971, Mitchell placed sixth in the women's 200-meter breaststroke with a time of 2:49.4, the best time for any Tacoma Swim Club participant. Her qualifying time of 2:49.3 for the 200 breaststroke for that year's nationals was her best individual performance in the event.

== 1972 Munich Olympics ==
Though she placed third with a time of 2:46.65 in the early August 1972 Chicago Olympic trails at the Portage Park Pool for the 200-meter breaststroke, finishing behind Dana Schoenfield and Claudia Clevenger who swam a 2:44.6, she was able to attend as the top three were selected.

As a 16-year old Secondary School student on a summer break from Seattle's Highline High School, on August 29, 1972, Mitchell competed in the women's 200-meter breaststroke, placing 2nd in Heat 2 of 6 preliminary heats. In a large and competitive field of nearly 40 competitors, she did not make the finals and recorded the thirteenth-best overall time of 2:47.05. Despite not making the finals, she was only around 3 seconds short of making the cut for the finals, and five seconds short of contending for a bronze medal, where the Australian swimmer Beverly Whitfield took the gold with a time of 2:41.71. In 1972, the U.S. Women's Olympic Swim team including Mitchell was coached by Sherm Chavoor, who had formerly trained several women Olympians at his Arden Hills Swim Club in Sacramento, California.

She continued to swim for the Tacoma swim club after the 1972 Olympics, competing a trip to Norway, Wales, England, and Copenhagen, Demark in the late summer of 1974. The Tacoma Club competed in two meets one in Norway, and one in Wales. Against the Norwegian National team, they won 10 of 12 events. They again won in a swim competition in Cardiff, Wales against a 1000 member Swim Club, the City of Cardiff team, coached by David Haller, who also coached the British National Team. Mitchel set an American record in the 200 meter Individual Medley in the meet against the City of Cardiff, which Hannula's Tacoma Swim Club won. After the meet in Cardiff, Wales, the American team spent time in London and Copenhagen.

== College years ==
In June, 1974, she attended the University of Texas, El Paso and was named to the Honor Roll.

=== University of Hawaii era ===
By 1975, Mitchell attended the University of Hawaii where she competed with the Hawaii Rainbow Wahine swim team through 1977. She was coached during her final year at the University of Hawaii by Brian Lee, a member of the Hawaiian Swimming Hall of Fame, who trained the University's Women's team from 1976-1978. Swimming for the University of Hawaii in March 1975, she set a Hawaiian record in the 200 Individual Medley of 2:11.26 at the Senior AAU Short Course Development Championships at the University of Hawaii in early March, 1975, and qualified for the Senior AAU Short Course National Championships in April, 1975. With the Hawaii Rainbow Wahine's, she won the 200 individual medley in National competition in 1975 to become the University of Hawaii's first national champion. In March, 1975, while at the University of Hawaii, she was rated in the top 20 in the women's division for collegiate swimmers. She had an overall fourth place ranking among women collegians in the 100 breaststroke with a time of 1:09.59, and another fourth place overall ranking of 2:12.58 in the 200 Individual Medley. While swimming for the University of Hawaii in March, 1975, she set a Hawaiian record in the 400 Individual Medley with a time of 4:34.67 at the Hawaii AAU Senior Short Course swimming championships at the University of Hawaii pool. Continuing to swim for the University of Hawaii into 1976 despite stiff competition at the AIAW Collegiate Women's Swimming and Diving National Championships in Fort Lauderdale on March 19, 1976, she placed 15th in the 200-yard individual medley with a time of 2:14, and sixth in the 200 breaststroke with a time of 2:09.

Continuing to swim into 1980, Mitchell swam the preliminary heats at the U.S. Swimming Championships in Irvine California in late July, 1980, but failed to make the finals with a time of 2:44.73 in the 200 breaststroke. On July 12, 1980, she swam in the Seattle Open at Coleman Pool, winning the 100 breaststroke with a time of 1:18.2.

=== Honors ===
In 1976, for her swimming achievements in 1975, she was a nominee for the Scott Shuman Female Athlete of the Year, an award given to athletes in Hawaii. In 2005, Mitchell became a member of the Pacific Northwest Swimming Hall of Fame.

== See also ==
- List of University of Hawaii alumni
