= Shelton Invitational =

The Shelton Invitational (also known as Shelton Invite) is an annual high school level track and field invitational meet held at Shelton High School's Highclimber Stadium in Shelton, Washington.

== History ==
Created in 1960, it is the longest running track invitational in Washington state. It was formed when the Centralia Relays meet (1930s to 1950s) ceased to exist, leaving the Western Washington region with no multi-team meets. Multi-team meets are created for coaches to challenge their top athletes with other top athletes from different schools. It was Aberdeen High School who won four of the first five Shelton Invites. As the years went by, the invite saw up to over 30 schools signed up per year. Sixteen years later, Shelton was seeing over 50 schools per year. By the 1980s, multi-team meets were becoming increasingly popular and started taking its toll on Shelton's entry list. In 1999, the Shelton Invite organizers began an effort to regain the meets status that it once had. The "new" Shelton Invite gathers the top sixteen athletes in Washington State high schools for each event. 2013 had a record number of 62 teams enter with their best athletes. The Shelton invite is considered Washington's No. 1 Elite track and field meet and one of the hardest to qualify for.

== Meet Records ==
=== Boy's Records ===
Event	Athlete	Time/Length/Height	School	Year
100 meters	Brian McDaniel	10.5	Wilson HS, Tacoma	1987
200 meters	John Bathhurst	21.5	Lake Washington HS, Kirkland	1978
400 meters	Calvin Kennon	46.8	Wilson HS, Tacoma	1981
800 meters	Kriag Norman	1:52.6	Sammamish HS, Bellevue	1986
1600 meters	Chris Lewis	4:04.6	Mead HS, Spokane	1989
1 mile	Steve Kaestner	4:13.2	Shoreline HS, Shoreline	1979
3200 meters	John Quade	9:03.1	Woodinville HS, Woodinville	1985
4 x 100 meter Relay	-	42.3	Foss HS, Tacoma	1980
4 x 400 meter Relay	-	3:18.4	Wilson HS, Tacoma	1982
Distance Medley Relay	-	10:47.07	Olympia HS, Olympia	2007
110 meter Hurdles	Lake Dawson	14.0	Federal Way HS, Federal Way	1989
300 meter Hurdles	Myron Wise	37.1	Lakes HS, Lakewood	1990
High Jump	Mike Nelson	7'¼"	Interlake HS, Bellevue	1979
Pole Vault	Joey Weiler	16'0"	R. A. Long HS, Longview	2016
Long Jump	Myron Wise	23'9½"	Lakes HS, Lakewood	1989
Triple Jump	Aaron Williams	47'7¾"	Wilson HS, Tacoma	1977
Shot Put	Vince Goldsmith	69'3"	Mt. Tahoma HS, Tacoma	1977
Discus	Jason Baskett	183'6"	Mead HS, Spokane	1989
Javelin	Tom Sinclair	226'9"	Peninsula HS, Gig Harbor	1975
Hammer Throw	Dylan Armstrong	243'11"	West Wynde Secondary, Kamloops, BC	1999

=== Girl's Records ===
Event	Athlete	Time/Length/Height	School	Year
100 meters	Alexis Yeater	11.9	Steilacoom HS, Steilacoom	1998
200 meters	Alexis Yeater	24.9	Steilacoom HS, Steilacoom	1998
400 meters	Jessie Bobert	56.84	Heritage HS, Vancouver	2003
800 meters	Chelsie Jorgensen	2:14.88	Puyallup HS, Puyallup	2007
1600 meters	Anna Blue	5:20.09	Olympia HS, Olympia	1998
1 mile	Sarah Lord	5:00.65	Redmond HS, Redmond	2009
3200 meters	Shannon Porter	10:44.60	Hockinson HS, Brush Prairie	2009
4 x 100 meter Relay	-	49.09	Kamiakin HS, Kennewick	2006
4 x 400 meter Relay	-	4:04.04	Shelton HS, Shelton	2001
Distance Medley Relay	-	12:52.45	Sequim HS, Sequim	2007
100 meter Hurdles	Kayla Stueckle	14.39	Emerald Ridge HS, Puyallup	2009
300 meter Hurdles	Stephanie Jones	44.91	Enumclaw HS, Enumclaw	2008
High Jump	Patrice Pierre	5'5"	North Thurston HS, Lacey	2002
Pole Vault	Abby Weiler	13'6"	R. A. Long HS, Longview	2015
Long Jump	Andrea Geubelle	19'0"	Curtis HS, University Place	2009
Triple Jump	Andrea Geubelle	39'3¼"	Curtis HS, University Place	2009
Shot Put	Shannon Rance	49'0"	Renton HS, Renton	2000
Discus	Shannon Rance	134'1"	Renton HS, Renton	2000
Javelin	Leslie Erickson	143'5"	North Thurston HS, Lacey	2000
Hammer Throw	Chelsea Payne	171'5"	Kajaks TC, Vancouver BC	2005
