= Earl Ellis (swim coach) =

American swimming coach

Biographical details
- Born: February 10, 1936 (age 90); Lewiston, Idaho
- Education: University of Iowa; University of Puget Sound (1959)

Playing career
- 1954-1956: University of Iowa; Coach David A. Armbruster Sr.
- 1958-1959: U. of Puget Sound; Coach Donald A. Duncan
- Positions: Freestyle Swimmer; Distance Runner

Coaching career (HC unless noted)
- 1960-1961: Highline High School; Cascade Swim Club
- 1963-1971: Triton Swim Club
- 1968-1969: University of Washington; Asst. Coach
- 1969-1998: University of Washington; Head coach

Head coaching record
- Overall: 215-45 .827 Win % (U. of Washington Men); 206-29-2 .873 Win % (U. of Washington Women)

Accomplishments and honors

Awards
- 1992-93 Pacific 10 Coach of the Year (University of Washington Women); ASCA Coaches Hall of Fame; 2004 U. Washington Hall of Fame

Earl N. Ellis (born February 10, 1936) is an American swimmer and coach who was the head coach of the University of Washington Huskies swim team from 1969 to 1998. He received All-American honors as a swimmer from the University of Iowa.

He was trained as a collegiate swimmer by David Armbruster at the University of Iowa and Donald A. Duncan at the University of Puget Sound. Primarily during his time at the University of Washington, Ellis coached seven swimmers who participated in the Olympics. Four of the Olympians he trained earned medals when including Lynn Colella who he unofficially trained while she attended the University of Washington from 1968 to 1972. Robin Backhaus, a 1972 Olympic medalist in butterfly, did not enroll and swim at the University of Washington, under Ellis until the following year. As of 1998, Ellis had one of the longest career tenures of any Washington coach.

== Early life and career ==
Ellis was born on February 10, 1936, in Lewiston, Idaho. He grew up in Mount Vernon, Washington, and attended Mount Vernon High School where he was an All-American swimmer in two years of competition. A two sport athlete, Ellis ran the half mile for Mount Vernon High's track team once a week, but lacked the time to train as a runner. At 15, on January 16, 1952, Ellis set a Washington High School State record in the 200-yard freestyle with a time of 2:12.7 in a winning meet against Highline High School at the Mount Vernon YMCA Pool.

At the Spokane Chronicle-Park Department's August 1952 Swimming and Diving Championships, he won two events representing Mount Vernon High, the 150-yard Individual Medley in 1:48, and the 50-yard backstroke in 32.4, and placed second in the 220 yard freestyle. Ellis also swam representing the Mount Vernon YMCA, and in July 1953 won the Green Lake Mile swim in a time of 24:23.2. As a High School Senior at the Washington State Swimming Championship on March 13, 1954, Ellis set a state meet record swimming the 200-yard freestyle in a record time of 2:02.4, and the 150-yard medley in a record time of 1:36.8. As a strong team contributor, on March 8, 1954, his Mount Vernon High School team defeated the University of Washington Freshman swimming team 39–36 in a meet in Seattle, where Ellis won both the 100 and 200-yard freestyle events.

== College years ==
=== University of Iowa ===
Ellis attended and swam for the University of Iowa, enrolling around 1954 where he swam for International Hall of Fame coach David Armbruster. While swimming with Iowa, he was a recipient of All-American honors. Armbruster coached at Iowa for over 30 years through 1958 and was a University of Iowa Hall of Fame honoree who was particularly skilled at teaching both breaststroke and butterfly. Armbruster's skills in teaching multiple strokes would be of considerable benefit to Ellis later in his swim coaching career. Several outstanding coaches, besides Ellis, were mentored by Armbruster including Hall of Fame Coach James "Doc" Counsilman of Indiana University who did graduate work at Iowa under Ellis.

As a freshman at the University of Iowa in the third week of April 1955, he won the 1,500 meter freestyle junior national competition with a time of 19:57 and also won the 200-yard freestyle at the same State Championship meet in Champaign. During his freshman year, he had first-place finishes in both the 200 and 500-yard freestyles at the April 16 AAU meet at the University of Oklahoma. As a sophomore, he competed in the 220 and 440 freestyle events and occasionally swam the 1500, where he would also excel. Distinguishing himself as a distance swimmer in April, 1955, as a freshman at Iowa, he won Carbondale, Illinois's AAU National Junior 1500 meter freestyle Championship. A versatile swimmer, Ellis competed occasionally in stroke events as well, winning the 200-yard Individual Medley in a meet with Michigan in January 1956. In September 1956, Ellis won a 2-mile swimming event at Iowa's Clear Lake with a time of :50:21, establishing a lead of two minutes. He spent much of the summer of 1956 training for the Olympics that year, but did not qualify for the trials.

=== University of Puget Sound ===
Around 1958, he enrolled at the University of Puget Sound, in Tacoma, Washington, about thirty-three miles South of his hometown of Mount Vernon. The university was then known as the College of Puget Sound, where he both ran distance for their track team, and received National Association of Intercollegiate Athletics (NAIA) League All American honors while competing as a member of Puget Sound's swim team from 1958 to 1959. He graduated Puget Sound in 1959 with a physical education degree and had also studied biology. Ellis swam for Puget Sound's Head Swimming Coach Donald A. Duncan, where he served as co-captain. Ellis had only one remaining year of competitive swimming eligibility when he enrolled at Puget Sound, and may have transferred hoping NAIA league rules would allow him one additional year to compete in collegiate swimming. He may also have been attracted by the Hugh Wallace Memorial pool, a new swimming facility used by the team. According to Coach Duncan, while competing for Puget Sound in 1958, Ellis already had aspirations to teach and to coach swimming as a career and helped to advise and mentor other team members during practices and meets. On February 16, 1959, he set a personal best time of 2:16.9 in the 200-meter freestyle in a meet against Western Washington in the CPS Pool.

He married Mary Patricia Stafford, a nurse and graduate of the University of Iowa, while a student at University of Puget Sound, on December 3, 1958.

Returning to the greater Seattle area in 1959, Ellis was coached by Dr. J.V. Curran while he swam for a period for the Chuck Lee Swim School in Everett, Washington thirty minutes North of Seattle, started by Charles Elsworth Lee in 1957. Swimming for the Chuck Lee School, he placed second in the 100 freestyle in a time of 55.1 at the Pacific Northwest AAU age-group meet.

== Coaching ==
Returning to greater Seattle from the University of Puget Sound's Tacoma, Ellis was a Highline High School swim coach from around 1960 through 1961, while also coaching the Cascade Swim Club. John Tallman, with whom Ellis would later coach at the University of Washington in 1968 was a co-founder of the Cascade Club. In 1962, in addition to his coaching responsibilities, he served as a buyer for Boeing, and was running as much as 10–15 miles a day for fitness. He coached at the Triton Swim Club, a strong program, from around 1963 though 1971. For fitness during his early coaching years, he continued to train as a runner in 1960 as he had in college, competing for the Seattle Olympic Club, where he completed the 10,000 meter run, recording a time of 35.20. In 1961, he set a local record for the 10,000 meter run of 30.15. He continued to compete in distance running through the 1990s, completing a half marathon in September 1990 and later competed as a Master's swimmer.

=== University of Washington coach ===
Ellis became an Assistant Coach for the University of Washington swim team in 1968, though a few sources claim he may have unofficially worked with the team somewhat earlier. At Washington, he was initially mentored by Head Coach John Tallman, and became head coach of the swimming program around 1969-1970. In 1968, in his first year as Coach, the Huskies did not earn a point at NCAA Nationals, but continued with higher NCAA national rankings, reaching a noteworthy 6th-place finish around the 1971 season. From 1970 to 1998, Ellis served as the University of Washington swimming team's Head Coach, leading the Men's team to an exceptional 215–45 win-loss record for a winning percentage of .827. As noted below, in a major coup for the Men's swimming team in December 1972, former Olympians Rick Demont and Robin Backhaus both accepted scholarships to swim for the University of Washington and would begin as Freshman in the Fall of 1973.

Ellis offered to start coaching a women's team at Washington when cuts in budgeting for the Men's team threatened to close the Men's program around 1976, and continued to coach the women's team for many years, through his retirement in 1998. Showing immediate results as the women's team coach, the Huskie's women's team finished in 16th place at the 1976 AIAW championships, their highest finish to date. In his twenty years as coach of the women's team, he retired in 1998 with a record of 206–29–2, with a slightly higher percentage of win's than the men's swim team. Due to imposing cuts in the swim program in the 1975-76 school years, a few top swimmers transferred from Washington.

==== Outstanding swimmers ====
Ellis coached future 1968 Olympic bronze backstroker Jack Horsley at the Triton Swim Club in the early 1960s. He coached Munich 1972 Olympic participant in the 200-meter breaststroke Barbara Anne Mitchell at the Triton Club in the mid to late 1960's. Other Olympians he coached included Rick Colella at the University of Washington from around 1973-1975, winner of a bronze 1976 Montreal Olympic medal in breaststroke. He also coached Olympic bronze medal winner in freestyle Doug Northway at the University of Washington who competed in the 1972 Olympics in Munich. He coached Rick Demont at the University of Washington, who competed in the 1968 Olympics in Mexico City, who was denied the 400-meter freestyle gold medal after a failed drug test. Ellis, like Demont had excelled in distance events as a collegiate swimmer. Ellis briefly coached 1972 Olympian, and bronze medalist Robin Backhaus at the University of Washington, before Backhouse transferred to the University of Alabama. Ellis excelled in teaching butterfly, the event in which Backhaus won his Olympic medal.

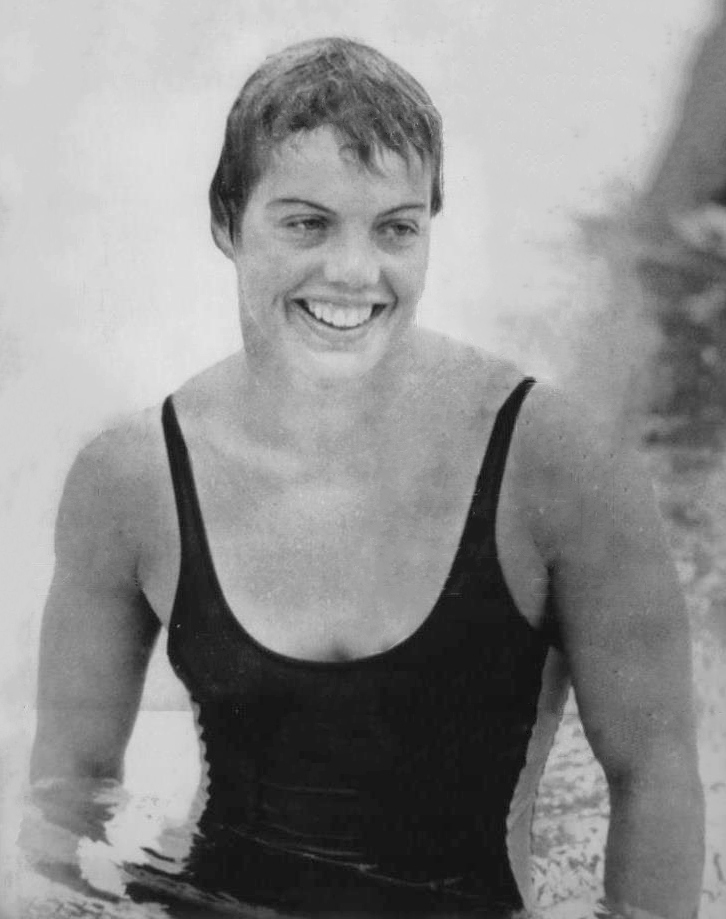
Olympian L. Colella, '73

Although there was officially no women's varsity swim team until 1976, Ellis trained Lynn Colella while she attended the University of Washington from 1968 to 1972. As noted, Ellis had specialized in teaching the butterfly and breaststroke at Washington and had competed in the individual medley as a swimmer at the University of Iowa. Collela would capture a silver medal swimming for the United States in the 200 meter butterfly at the 1972 Munich Olympics. She would win a total of 10 medals including five golds in breaststroke, butterfly and medley events at the 1973 World Championships in Belgrade, the 1971 Pan American Games in Cali, Colombia, and the 1970 Universiade in Turin. Among non-Olympians, he coached Jody Braden at the University of Vancouver, from around 1988-1992. Braden was a 1991 silver medalist at the Pan American games in Havana, coached swimming at the Portland Aquatic Club in 2005 and was an inductee to the University of Washington Athletic Hall of Fame.

In 1986, Ellis served as an Assistant Coach for the West Team at America's Olympic Festival under Head Coach Albert Minn.

Ellis continued to run through age 59 in a few distance track events, including the 1995 12-mile Sound to Narrows Event in Tacoma where he recorded a time of 48.44. In his later career, when he was unable to pursue fitness with a strict daily running regiment due to joint issues, he began to focus on swimming to remain fit, and swam about an hour a day near his home in Winthrop, Washington, with only a day or two off per week. Continuing to swim fairly regularly after his retirement for fitness between the ages of 68-80, he attended meets with United States Masters Swimming and competed primarily in 50, 100, 200 and 500 freestyle events in the greater Washington state area. He swam in Oregon and Washington statewide meets, and a few Senior Games competitions. Among the Masters teams he affiliated with were the Washington Huskies Masters.

==== Honors ====
In the 1992–93 season, Ellis was the Women's Coach of the Year for the Pacific-10 Conference. He was a 2004 inductee to the University of Washington Husky Hall of Fame, and was an inaugural inductee of the Mark Prothero Award in 2014. The Prothero Award was given by the University of Washington for outstanding contributions to the sport as a volunteer, swimmer, or coach. In a distinct honor, he was an inductee to the American Swimming Coaches Association Hall of Fame.
