= Andy Strenk =

American swimmer (born 1949)

Personal information
- Full name: Andrew Edward Strenk
- Nickname: "Andy"
- National team: United States
- Born: July 7, 1949 (age 77) Philadelphia, Pennsylvania, U.S.
- Height: 6 ft 2 in (1.88 m)
- Weight: 165 lb (75 kg)

Sport
- Sport: Swimming
- Strokes: Freestyle
- Club: Los Angeles Athletic Club
- College team: University of Southern California
Medal record
Men's swimming
Representing the United States
Pan American Games
Bronze medal – third place	1967 Winnipeg	1500 m freestyle
Universiade
Gold medal – first place	1970 Turin	400 m freestyle
Gold medal – first place	1970 Turin	1500 m freestyle
Gold medal – first place	1970 Turin	4x200 m freestyle
Silver medal – second place	1967 Tokyo	1500 m freestyle

Andrew Edward Strenk (born July 7, 1949) is an American former competition swimmer and Pan American Games medalist.

== Sporting Achievements ==
Strenk represented the United States at the 1968 Summer Olympics in Mexico City. He swam for the gold medal-winning U.S. team in the preliminary heats of the men's 4×200-meter freestyle relay. He did not receive a medal, however; under the 1968 international swimming rules, only those relay swimmers who swam in the event final were eligible to receive a medal.

Prior to the 1968 Olympics, Strenk was a member of the U.S. national team assembled for the 1967 Pan American Games in Winnipeg, Canada, where he won a bronze medal in the men's 1,500-meter freestyle with a time of 17:03.43. After the Olympic Games, he was a gold medalist in the men's 400-meter freestyle, 1,500-meter freestyle, and 4×200-meter freestyle relay at the 1970 World University Games held in Turin, Italy. He was also a member of the 1971 Pan American Games team that competed in Cali, Colombia in 1971. Strenk attended the University of Southern California, where he swam for the USC Trojans swimming and diving team and was a three-year All American.

== Life and career ==
He graduated from Southern Cal with his bachelor's degree in history and Phi Beta Kappa honors in 1971, and earned a master's degree from the University of Würzburg in 1975. His thesis was on "American-Russian Relations During the American Civil War". He later returned to Southern California and completed his doctorate in European history, and served as a lecturer at his alma mater from 1978-1983.

Strenk has lectured and written on the impact of international sports on politics and international relations. He served as the historian of the Los Angeles Olympic Organizing Committee for the 1984 Summer Olympics. He has continued to comment on the evolution of the Olympic Games. He now works as an international business and real estate development consultant and is a principal in Strategic Planning Concepts International. Among real estate projects that he helped to plan have been Antara Polanco (Mexico City), Andares (Zapopan), Punta Sur (Tlajomulco), Punta Valle, Metropolitan and Arboleda (San Pedro Garza Garcia) and Plaza Peninsula and Alameda Otay (Tijuana). He was the chief planner for the ARCO Olympic Training Center in Chula Vista, California.

== See also ==
- List of University of Southern California people
- Peter Daland
- Don Gambril
