= Władysław Wojtakajtis =

Polish swimmer

Personal information
- Born: 3 February 1949 Starogard, Poland
- Died: 2 March 2016 (aged 67)

Sport
- Sport: Swimming
Medal record
Representing Poland
Summer Universiade
Bronze medal – third place	1970 Turin	1500m freestyle

Władysław Wojtakajtis (3 February 1949 – 2 March 2016) was a Polish freestyle swimmer. He competed at the 1968 Summer Olympics and the 1972 Summer Olympics.
