= Lynn Colella =

American swimmer (born 1950)

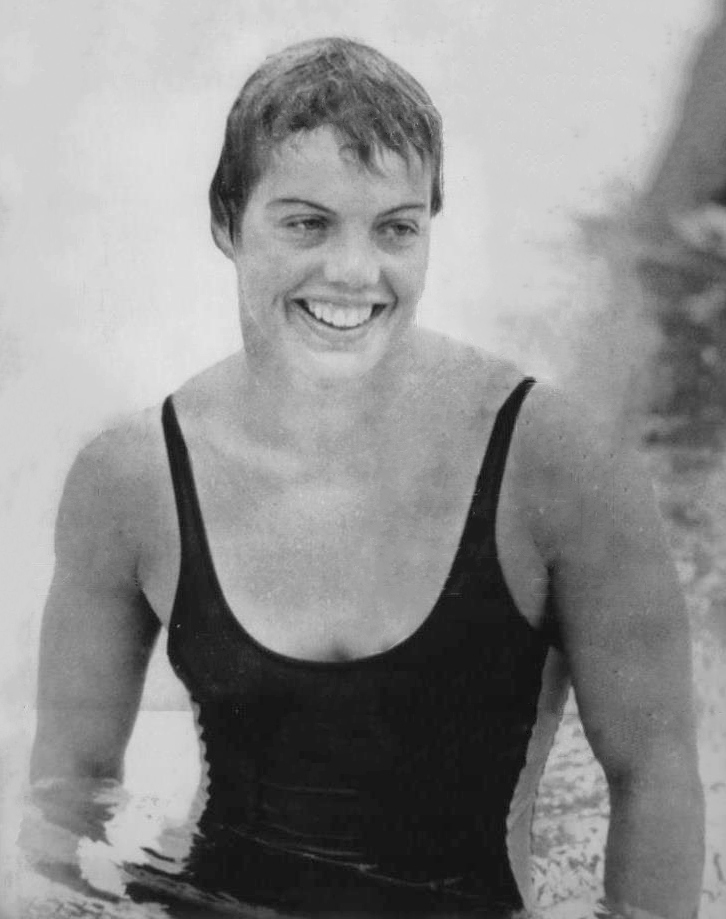
- Colella in 1973

Personal information
- Full name: Lynn Ann Colella
- National team: United States
- Born: June 13, 1950 (age 76) Seattle, Washington, U.S.
- Occupations: Coaching, Computer software
- Height: 5 ft 7 in (1.70 m)
- Weight: 134 lb (61 kg)
- Children: 4

Sport
- Sport: Swimming
- Strokes: Breaststroke, butterfly
- Club: Cascade Swim Club; Totem Lakes Swim Club
- College team: University of Washington
- Coach: Earl Ellis (U. Wash); John Tallman (U. Wash)
Medal record
Representing the United States
Olympic Games
Silver medal – second place	1972 Munich	200 m butterfly
World Championships (LC)
Bronze medal – third place	1973 Belgrade	200 m breaststroke
Bronze medal – third place	1973 Belgrade	200 m butterfly
Pan American Games
Gold medal – first place	1971 Cali	200 m breaststroke
Gold medal – first place	1971 Cali	200 m butterfly
Silver medal – second place	1971 Cali	4x100 m medley
Bronze medal – third place	1971 Cali	100 m breaststroke
Universiade
Gold medal – first place	1970 Turin	100m butterfly
Gold medal – first place	1970 Turin	200m medley
Gold medal – first place	1970 Turin	4x100m medley

Lynn Ann Colella (born June 13, 1950), also known for a period by her married name Lynn Colella-Bell, is an American former swimmer and Olympic medalist who trained at Seattle's Cascade Swim Club and at the University of Washington before the college had a varsity women's team. She represented the United States at the 1972 Summer Olympics in Munich, Germany, where she won a silver medal in the 200-meter butterfly, finishing second behind American team member Karen Moe. In butterfly and breaststroke events during her swimming career, she set six American records. She is the older sister of Rick Colella, a 1976 Montreal Olympic bronze medalist in the 200-meter breaststroke.

== Early life and swimming ==
Colella was born June 13, 1950, in Seattle, Washington. Her talents were first noticed when she was swimming with two of her brothers at Seattle's Sand Point Country Club, where an observer suggested she swim for Seattle's Cascade Swim Club. Lynn attended Seattle's Nathan Hale High School, where she graduated in 1968, and won her first national race at 18 after high school graduation. During her high school years, she was an eight time winner at the city wide Seattle All-City Swim Carnival.

=== Cascade and Totem Lakes swim clubs ===
As early as age 10 on April 8–9, 1961, Colella swam for Seattle's Cascade Swim Club, a strong local program, where she progressed rapidly winning the 100-yard IM in 1:26.8, and the 50-yard backstroke in 40.5 seconds at the Northwest Kiwanis Age Group Meet in Spokane, where she scored the most points in her age group. The Cascade Club, was founded in 1959 by former University of Washington swimmers Bob Regan, Bob Miller, and John Tallman. Tallman would later coach Lynn at the University of Washington in Tacoma. Earl Ellis, who would also coach Colella at Washington, briefly coached at the Cascade Club when Lynn first started in 1961.

By the age of thirteen in August, 1973, she swam for the Totem Lakes Swim Club, recording a meet record time and National Qualifying Time of 2:28.94 in the 200 Individual Medley at the Northwest AAU Swimming Championship in Lake Oswego, Oregon. She swam for Totem Lakes primarily in the mid-1970's.

In 1968, Colella missed a berth on the U.S. Olympic team by only .37 seconds, placing fourth in the 200-meter butterfly trials at Long Beach with a time of 2:23.48. Collela finished one place behind third place Diane Giebel who swam a 2:23.11. Due to her fourth place finish, Colella did not qualify for the U.S. Olympic team.

== University of Washington ==
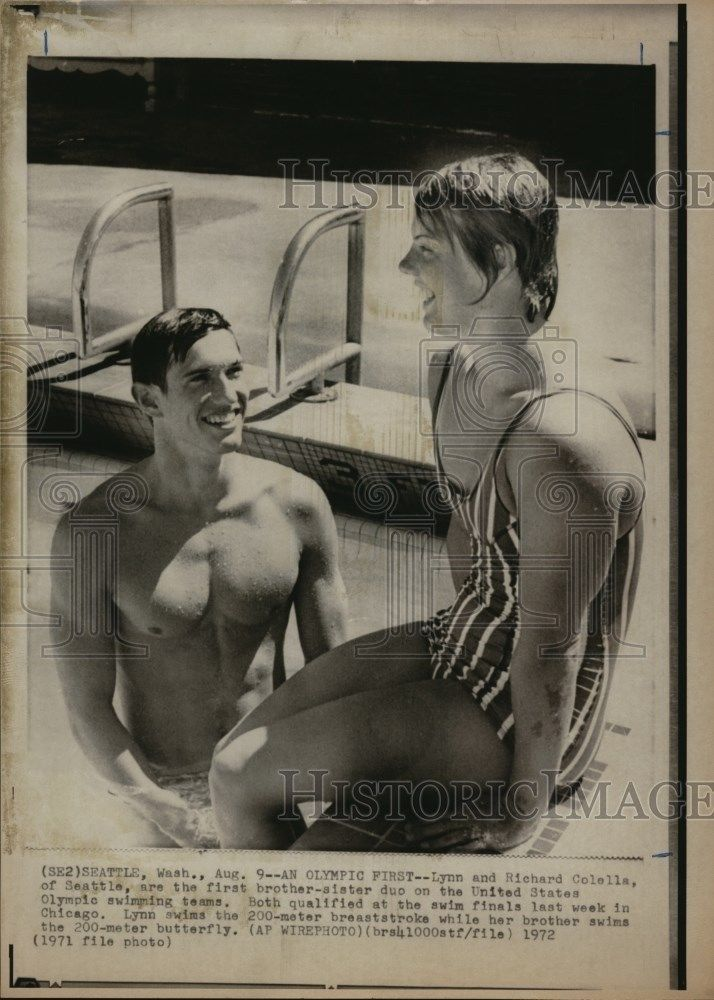
Lynn with brother Rick in 72

Colella attended the University of Washington as an undergraduate roughly from 1968-1972, and completed an undergraduate degree in electrical engineering, while later pursuing post-graduate studies at Washington. Her brother Rick, a 1976 Olympic medalist, attended Washington from 1969-1973 and swam for the team. A solid student, Lynn was a member of the Phi Beta Kappa academic honorary as an undergraduate. She received a scholarship to aid with her tuition from Phillips Petroleum, a company that has also sponsored at least one California age-group swim team. Lynn trained with the men's varsity swim team at Washington as there was no women's varsity team until 1976. In her Freshman year, she was coached by Head Coach John Tallman who served as Washington's Head Coach after 1962. For most of her time training with the Huskies men's varsity, she was managed by the American Swim Coaches Association's Hall of Fame Coach Earl Ellis who was Head Coach of the Husky's swim team from 1969-1998 and would serve as the first coach of Washington's women's team in 1976. As a former swimmer at the University of Iowa, Coach Ellis had trained with David Armbruster who was particularly skilled at teaching Lynn's specialties, breaststroke and butterfly. Though primarily a distance freestyler, Ellis himself had competed in the Individual Medley during his College years, and would have particular success and skills mentoring swimmers, including Colella and her brother Rick, in the butterfly and breaststrokes.

While swimming for the University of Washington, Colella captured three titles in the National Competition of the Association for Intercollegiate Athletics (AIAW) and in 1972 at the AIAW Women's Chamionships, where she established three new records for the meet.

She broke an American record in the 200 meter butterfly with a time of 2:21.6 at the 1969 AAU National Swimming and Diving Championships in mid-August 1969. As a Sophomore at the University of Washington, she swam a new American record time of 2:03.93 for the 200-yard butterfly at the AAU National Short Course Swimming Championship on April 11–12, 1970.

During her college years, Lynn also trained with the University of Washington Club team, and the University of Washington Intramural women's swimming group that competed at the Association for Intercollegiate Athletics for Women (AIAW) national championships. Lynn captured three titles at an AIAW meet, and set three records at the AIAW National Collegiate Championship in 1972.

== 1972 Olympic silver medal ==
Serving as a Co-captain at the 1972 Munich Olympics, Colella received a silver medal in the women's 200 meter butterfly event, finishing with a time of 2:15.57. In the event final, American Ellie Daniel, the 1968 Mexico Olympic bronze medalist in the event, took the lead on the first lap over the 100-meter butterfly champion, Mayumi Aoki of Japan, but Rosemarie Kother of East Germany took a substantial 100 meter lead over both competitors. Kother held her lead through 150 meters, but at the 150-meter turn American Ellie Daniel recaptured the lead, with world record holder American Karen Moe on her heels. Moe took and never relinquished the lead at the 170 meter mark. At roughly the same time, American Karen Moe took the lead at the 170-meter mark, Colella passed both Daniel and Kother. In a highly competitive race and close finish, the Americans swept the finals, with Karen Moe winning the gold, Colella taking the silver only .77 seconds behind Moe, and American teammate Ellie Daniel taking the bronze only .4 seconds behind Collela.

Swimming a 2:41.630 in the 200-meter breaststroke and a 2:18.348 in the 200-meter butterfly at the AAU Nationals in August 1973 in Louisville, Kentucky, she captured National titles in both events, and qualified to swim in the World Championship that September in Belgrade, Yugoslavia.

In international competition at the 1973 World Championships in Belgrade, Lynn won bronze medals in both the 200-meter breaststroke and butterfly events. At the 1971 Pan American Games in Cali, Lynn won golds in both the 200-meter breaststroke and butterfly, a silver in the 4x100-meter medley relay, and a bronze in the 100-meter breaststroke. She won three golds at the Universiade in Turin in the 100-meter butterfly, the 200-meter medley, and the 4x100-meter medley relay.

=== Later life ===
In 1975, as Lynn Colella-Bell, she worked as an Assistant swimming coach at the University of Washington where she had been an outstanding member of the women's swim team.

In 2008, as Lynn Colella, she was living in Redmond, Washington, around eleven miles Northeast of her hometown of Seattle. She had four grown children, and was single. She had taken up soccer as a sport to retain her fitness. A former electrical engineering major at U. Washington, she had owned a software business, and was studying the technology of the world wide web, possibly anticipating a return to the high technology industry.

Continuing to swim for fitness, Colella competed with United States Masters Swimming as a member of the Puget Sound Masters in meets in 2023 at the age of 73, in freestyle, breast, butterfly, and individual events.

=== Honors ===
In 1971 Lynn and her brother Richard won the Seattle Post-Intelligencer Man of the Year award. Colella was admitted to the University of Washington's Husky Hall of Fame in 1980. She was the first women to gain entrance into the honorary, and was awarded four consecutive years of varsity letters for each of her years of attendance. Lynn is also a Seattle Public High School Athletic Hall of Fame inductee, and was admitted to the Pacific Northwest Swimming Hall of Fame in 2004.

== See also ==
- List of Olympic medalists in swimming (women)
- List of University of Washington people
- List of World Aquatics Championships medalists in swimming (women)
