= Jack Horsley =

American swimmer

Personal information
- National team: United States
- Born: Jackson Stewart Horsley; September 25, 1951 (age 74) Salt Lake City, Utah, U.S.
- Occupation: Physician
- Height: 6 ft 0 in (1.83 m)
- Weight: 141 lb (64 kg)

Sport
- Sport: Swimming
- Strokes: Backstroke, Freestyle
- Club: Red Shield Triton Swim Club; Tacoma Swim Club (TSC)
- College team: Indiana University
- Coach: Earl Ellis (Tritons); Dick Hannula (Tacoma SC) "Doc" Counsilman (Indiana)
Medal record
Men's swimming
Representing the United States
Olympic Games
Bronze medal – third place	1968 Mexico City	200 m backstroke

Jackson Stewart Horsley (born September 25, 1951) is an American former competition swimmer, American record holder, and Olympic medalist who swam for Indiana University and represented the United States at the 1968 Summer Olympics in Mexico City, where he won a bronze medal in the 200 meter backstroke. He set an American record in the 200 meter backstroke in 1968. After completing medical school at the University of Cincinnati, he later practiced medicine as a Director of the Student Health Center at Central Washington University.

== Early life and swimming ==
Horsley was born in Salt Lake City, Utah on September 25, 1951. After a family move, he attended Highline High School in Burien, a suburb of Seattle, Washington, where he graduated in the Spring of 1969. His well-educated father held a PHd in Physics which may have influenced Horsley's academic focus in Science. Swimming for Seattle's Red Shield Triton Swim Club, part of the Red Shield Youth Club, on June 27, 1965 in Tacoma, he won the 100 meter backstroke at the Pacific Northwest Junior Olympics in a meet record time of 1:12.6. At the Triton Club he swam under accomplished coach Earl Ellis, a 2011 American Swimming Coaches Association Hall of Fame recipient, who would coach swimming at the University of Washington for 30 years, and train seven Olympians during his career. Swimming again for the Tritons, he placed first in the 200 meter backstroke with a time of 2:27.2 and placed second in the 400 and 800 meter freestyles at the Chronicle Park Meet in greater Spokane. Swimming again for the Tritons at the February 3, 1968 AAU Pacific Northwest Swimming Championships, he helped lead the Tritons to a team championship, winning the 200 freestyle in a time of 1:52.2, the 500 freestyle in 4:54.3, and the 100 backstroke in :55.7, with two of his wins in age group record times. He would also swim for a period in greater Tacoma at the Tacoma Swim Club under Hall of Fame Coach Dick Hannula.

== World and American records ==
At 16, entering his High School Senior year in 1968, he won the U.S. National Swimming Championship in the 200 meter backstroke, setting a new American record.

On July 26, 1968, as one of American swimming's rising stars, he set a world record of 8:51.8 in the 880-yard freestyle at the Seattle Times Swim meet in Seattle, Washington at the Colman Pool.

== 1968 Mexico City Olympics ==
On September 2, 1968 at the 1968 Olympic trials in early September in Long Beach, California, Horsley set a new American record for the 200 meter backstroke finishing first with a time of 2:08.74, and moving ahead of rival Mitch Ivey at the last second of the event trial. Ivey swam a very close 2:08.82. Horsley's first place finish qualified him for the U.S. Olympic team.

After travelling to Mexico with the U.S. team, at 17, prior to his High School Senior year, he competed at the October, 1968 Summer Olympics in Mexico City, where he won a bronze medal in the 200 meter backstroke on October 25, 1968. He swam a 2:10.9 in a close finish behind gold medal winning Roland Matthes of East Germany who swam a 2:09.6, and American Mitch Ivey who swam a 2:10.6. Ivey was a close rival, with whom he had tied for the American record in the 200 meter backstroke at the U.S. trials, though Horsley's time was .08 seconds faster. Horsley had placed ahead of Ivey in several previous meets.

After the Olympics, Horsley swam in the 1970 World University games but did not medal.

=== Indiana University ===
He enrolled in Indiana University for the Fall of 1969, where he swam for Hall of Fame coach Doc Counsilman's Indiana Hoosiers swimming and diving team in National Collegiate Athletic Association (NCAA) and Big Ten Conference competition. As a Freshman, Horsley was anticipating a major in pre-medical studies. A powerful program, the Indiana University swim team won the NCAA Division I championships consecutively from 1971-1974, which included several years of Horsley's tenure with the team. Horsley's teammates included 1972 seven-time Munich Olympic gold medalist Mark Spitz. Horsley began training with Indiana in the summer of 1969, prior to his Indiana Freshman year, with his hand in a cast and plastic bag. The accident occurred earlier at one of Indiana's two a day practices when he smashed his hand into a swimmer in an adjoining lane. Despite the early injury, Horsley would become an All American while at Indiana. By March, 1971, his best times in NCAA competition included a 53.8 in the 100 backstroke, and a 1:56.6 in the 200 backstroke.

=== Professional career ===
He graduated from Indiana University with a bachelor's degree, and later earned his medical degree from the University of Cincinnati Medical School. He completed his internal medicine residency in Stockton, California, and lived in Ellensburg, Washington after 1979. In Ellensburg, Washington, he worked to become board certified in emergency medicine, and served as the medical director of Central Washington University's student health center.

== Honors ==
He was made a member of the Highline High School Hall of Fame in 2000. In 2004, he was admitted to the Pacific Northwest Swimming Hall of Fame.

Horsley is a member of the Church of Jesus Christ of Latter-day Saints.

== See also ==
- List of Indiana University (Bloomington) people
- List of Olympic medalists in swimming (men)
