= Mirjana Šegrt =

Croatian swimmer

Medal record

Women's swimming

Representing Yugoslavia

European Championships
Silver medal – second place	1970 Barcelona	100 m freestyle
Silver medal – second place	1970 Barcelona	200 m freestyle
Silver medal – second place	1970 Barcelona	200 m butterfly

Universiade
Gold medal – first place	1970 Turin	100m freestyle
Gold medal – first place	1970 Turin	100m butterfly
Silver medal – second place	1970 Turin	4x100m freestyle
Bronze medal – third place	1970 Turin	4x100m medley

Mirjana Šegrt (born 13 April 1950, in Dubrovnik) is a retired Croatian freestyle and butterfly swimmer who competed in the 1968 Summer Olympics for Yugoslavia. She was fifth in the 200 m and seventh in 100 m freestyle events. She also won three silver medals at the 1970 European Aquatics Championships.
