= Barbara Mitchell (disambiguation) =

Barbara Mitchell was an actress.

Barbara Mitchell may also refer to:

- Barbara Mitchell (swimmer), American swimmer in 1972 Olympics
- Barbara Mitchell, musician in High Inergy
- Barbara Mitchell, character in 52 Pick-Up
