= Dick Hannula =

American swimming coach

- Around 28 in 1958, accepting Wilson High School position

Biographical details
- Born: circa 1930; Tacoma, Washington, U.S.
- Education: Washington State University (1951 Graduate)

Playing career
- 1944–1947: Aberdeen High School
- 1947–1951: Washington State
- Positions: freestyle, backstroke

Coaching career (HC unless noted)
- 1951–1958: Lincoln High School
- 1958–1983: Wilson High School
- 1953–1993: Tacoma Swim Club
- 73, 75, 76, 78, 85: U.S. National Team
- 1984, 1988: U.S. National Team; Olympic Coach
- 2007–2008: University Puget Sound; Asst. Coach

Accomplishments and honors

Championships
- '53 '55 High School State Championships (Lincoln High School), Tacoma, WA; 24 High School State Championships 1960–83 (Wilson High School), Tacoma, WA

Awards
- '80 National High School Coach of the Year '80 NISCA Nat. Coll. and Schol. Trophy; NISCA Swimming Hall of Fame; International Swimming Hall of Fame

Records
- (1960–83) 323 Consecutive Wins (Woodrow Wilson High School)

Dick Hannula, Sr. (born c. 1930) is an International Hall of Fame swimming coach and former competitive swimmer for Washington State University from Tacoma, Washington best remembered for starting the Tacoma Swim Club in 1953, which he coached through 1993. He coached his Wilson High School boys' teams to 24 consecutive state championships from 1960 to 1983, and a total of 323 winning consecutive swim meets. He received global recognition for coaching Olympic team swimmer and 1969 gold medalist Kaye Hall Greff, and additional recognition for coaching 1979 World University Games Gold medalist Janet Buchan. He coached his sons Dick, David and Dan Hannula, Olympic pentathlete Chuck Richards, and 1976 Olympian and Tacoma Swim Club swimmer Miriam Smith. His top performing swimmers took two World Records, two Olympic Records, thirteen American Records, and two National High School Records.

== Early swimming and education ==
Hannula was born in the Tacoma, Washington area to John Hannula Jr. who owned John Hannula Fish Company in nearby Aberdeen. Hannula worked for a period in High School delivering fish to restaurants before the start of the school day. He attended Aberdeen High School, in Aberdeen, Washington, where he swam for John "Bus" Fairbairn, who coached the school's swim teams from 1944 to 1956, where he developed 16 state swimming champions, and two state championship teams in 1948 and 1949. Hannula enjoyed and excelled in the backstroke. Another Aberdeen High School graduate and swimmer for Fairbairn was Donald A. Duncan, who coached at Puget Sound University from 1957 to 1994 prior to Hannula's time as Assistant Coach. Coach Fairbairn had strong links to the swimming community and served as president of the Washington Interscholastic Swimming Coaches Association (WISCA) in 1952.

Hannula received more extensive swim training at Washington State University where he swam for Coach Doug Gibb, a swim team member and 1941 graduate of Washington State who coached from 1942 to 1974. Hannula majored in Business, graduating in 1951. In his Senior year, he Captained the Washington State team.

== Coaching ==
Coach Hannula started the Tacoma Swim Club around 1953, and served as the head coach for 40 years through 1993, continuing to coach with the club after retiring from his last High School coaching job at Woodrow Wilson in 1983.

=== Lincoln High Coach ===
From 1951 to 1958, immediately after completing his education at Washington State, Hannula coached seven years at Tacoma's Lincoln High School winning state championships in 1953 and 1955. He coached numerous national high school champions and record holders.

=== Woodrow Wilson High Coach ===
Hannula then began working as an high school coach at Tacoma's Woodrow Wilson High School, known as Silas High School since 2020. Hannula was hired when the school first opened in 1958, and within only two years his boys' teams won 24 consecutive state championships from 1960 through 1983, when Wilson retired from High School coaching. His teams at Wilson won a total of 323 swim meets without a loss in relay, dual, state and regional meets.

Coming out of retirement, Hannula became the assistant coach for The University of Puget Sound's men's and women's swim teams in the 2007–2008 season.

=== Swim community work and international coaching ===
A contributor in international swimming, Hannula is renowned for his coaching successes and for his work as an author, mentor, lecturer, writer, and inventor, in the swimming community. In 1990, he was the commissioner of swimming for the Goodwill Games. A four-term president of the National Swimming Association, he coached the US National Swim Team in 1973, 1975 (in the Pan American Games), 1976, 1978, and 1985. He managed the national swim team in 1979, at the 1984 Summer Olympics and the 1988 Summer Olympics.

=== Honors ===
In 1980 Dick Hannula was honored as Coach of the Year by the National Federation of State High School Associations and the National High School Athletic Coaches Association. He is a member of the Washington State University Athletic Hall of Fame. The National Interscholastic Swimming Coaches Association (NISCA) presented him with the National Collegiate and Scholastic Award in 1980 and inducted him in the NISCA Hall of Fame in 1982. Coach Hannula was inducted into the Washington Interscholastic Activities Association (WIAA) Hall of Fame in 2004. He has received the WSU Alumni Achievement Award. In 1980, he was chosen as the National High School Swim Coach of the Year, and in a more distinctive and unique honor, in 1987 was named an Honor Coach in the International Swimming Hall of Fame.

He resides in North Tacoma with his wife, Sylvia. He has four children. Hannula is of Finnish and Austrian origin.

Hannula is the author of Hannula, Dick (2003). Coaching Swimming Successfully. Human Kinetics. ISBN 0-7360-4519-8., and The Swim Coaching Bible, Volume II. He is the inventor of Han's Paddles, the first "holed" paddles worn on the palms of the hands used for strengthening arms and shoulders while focusing on stroke technique.

== See also ==
- List of members of the International Swimming Hall of Fame
