= Miriam Smith (swimmer) =

American former competition swimmer (born 1958)

Personal information
- Full name: Miriam Smith
- National team: United States
- Born: September 25, 1958 (age 68) Mount Holly, New Jersey, U.S.
- Height: 5 ft 7 in (1.70 m)
- Weight: 130 lb (59 kg)

Sport
- Sport: Swimming
- Strokes: Backstroke
- Club: Tacoma Swim Club
- College team: University of Southern California
- Coach: Tacoma Swim Club (Dick Hannula); USC (Peter Dalland)

Miriam Smith (born September 25, 1958) is an American former competition swimmer who represented the United States at the 1976 Summer Olympics in Montreal, Quebec. Smith swam in the preliminary heats of the women's 200-meter backstroke event, and recorded a time of 2:22.05. In the preliminaries, she finished with the 13th fastest time, though in the competitive world of Olympic competition, her time was only 7 seconds behind the finalist who took the bronze medal.

== Early swimming and education ==
She swam with the Tacoma Swim Club and Wilson High School where she was managed by Hall of Fame Head Coach Dick Hannula. While swimming for the Tacoma Swim Club at the PNA Junior Olympics in July of 1974, she swam a 1:12.6 for the 100-meter butterfly, demonstrating her varied stroke skills. While still swimming for Tacoma, at the National AAU Championships in Cupertino in August, 1974, she swam a 2:24.8 in the Women's 200-meter backstroke, receiving national attention in the swim community. She swam with the Tacoma Club from around 1972-1980, continuing into her Olympic and collegiate career. During her High School years, Miriam was an All-American in the 100 backstroke in both 1975 and 1976. At the State Championships, she was a Washington state champion four consecutive years in the 100 backstroke and was a finalist on the national level during high school from 1973-76 in her signature strokes, the 100 and 200 backstroke.

== Swimming for USC ==
Graduating in 1980, she was an outstanding swimmer with the University of Southern California, where she was studied Detal Hygiene and was coached by International Swimming Hall of Fame Coach Peter Daland. During her swimming years at the college, she was an All-American three times, earning the honor in 1977, 1978 and 1980. She earned 1977 AIAW championship honors in the 100 backstroke, and also competed in the 200 backstroke and 200 medley relay to earn her status as an All-American.

In 1977, she swam with the US National Team at a meet in Leningrad. From 1974-77, she was a finalist at US Nationals in the 100 and 200 backstroke events. She became a member of the Pacific Northwest Swimming Hall of Fame in 2005.

After College, she married and became Miriam Greenwood, had three daughters and a son, who all did some swimming, settling near Clovis, California, outside Fresno. Several of her children swam and attended Buchanan High School in Clovis.
