= Rick DeMont =

American swimmer (born 1956)

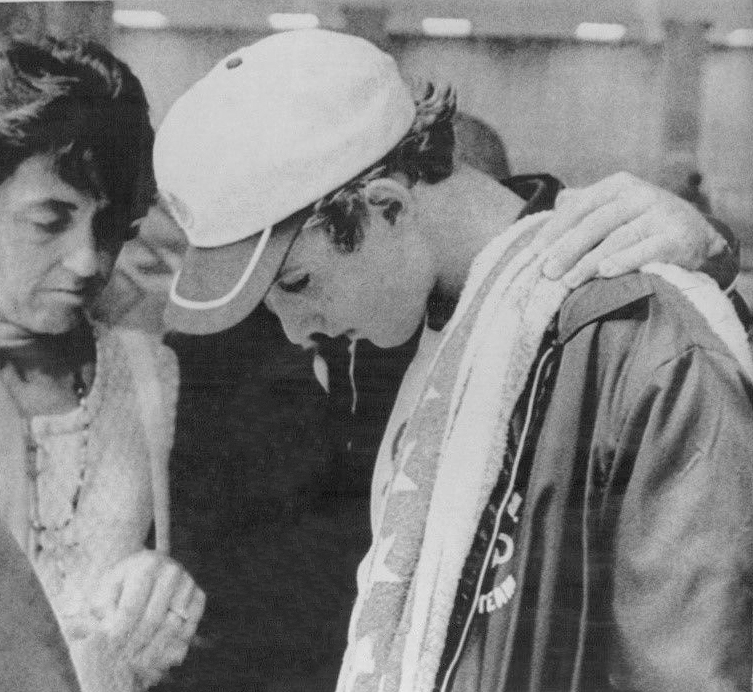
- DeMont at the 1972 Olympics

Biographical details
- Born: April 21, 1956 (age 70); San Francisco, California, U.S.
- Height: 6 ft 2 in (1.88 m)
- Weight: 185 lb (84 kg)
- Education: University of Washington 1973-75; University of Arizona 1977-79.

Playing career
- 1973-1975 1977-1979: University of Washington (Coach Earl Ellis); University of Arizona (Coach Bob Davis)
- Positions: Freestyle; Height: 6 ft 2 in (1.88 m)

Coaching career (HC unless noted)
- 2004, 2008: South African Olympic Team
- 1987-2017: University of Arizona
- 2009-: Rick DeMont Family Swim School

Accomplishments and honors

Awards
- World Swimmer of the Year (1973); International Swimming Hall of Fame (1990)
Medal record
Representing the United States
World Championships (LC)
Gold medal – first place	1973 Belgrade	400 m freestyle
Silver medal – second place	1973 Belgrade	1500 m freestyle
Pan American Games
Gold medal – first place	1975 Mexico City	4×200 m freestyle
Silver medal – second place	1975 Mexico City	200 m freestyle

Richard James DeMont (born April 21, 1956) is an American former competition swimmer, world champion, and former world record-holder in multiple events. Despite placing first in the 400-meter freestyle at the 1972 Summer Olympics, DeMont is remembered for the controversy subsequently arising from his disqualification and being stripped of the 400-meter gold medal after testing positive for a prohibited substance present in his prescription asthma medication. After retiring from his swimming career, where he won gold and silver medals at the World Aquatics and Pan American Championships, DeMont had an accomplished career as a swim team coach with the University of Arizona for thirty years from 1987 to 2017.

DeMont was born in San Francisco, California on April 21, 1956, the oldest of four children to Dr. Willard and Betty DeMont. The family moved to in Mill Valley, California until DeMont was six, when they moved to suburban San Rafael, California, where he attended Terra Linda High School, graduating in 1973. Around the age of seven, he began swimming with two time Olympic medalist Ann Curtis (Cuneo)'s Ann Curtis swim team in Terra Linda, where at ten, he set the AAU National record for the 200-yard freestyle with a time of 2:09.5.

== Marin Aquatic Club ==
As would his three younger siblings, DeMont later competed and worked out with the outstanding swimming program at the Marin Aquatic Club where he was trained by Art Octavio, and Galen Hopkins, and by 1971 with Hall of Fame Coach Don Swartz. Swartz became head coach of the newly formed Marin Aquatic Club in 1971 when Galen Hopkins retired due to a back injury. Swartz's Marin Aquatic Club had many All-Americans from local High Schools and consistently placed in the top 10 at AAU National Championships. Around his senior year at Terra Linda High in 1973, after setting two distance freestyle world records and winning gold and silver medals at the World Aquatic Championships, he was named World Swimmer of the Year by Swimming World magazine. In 1973, DeMont also held a national record in the 200 meter free of 1:55.60. At the Los Angeles Invitational Swim Meet on August 2, 1973, DeMont swam a 16:05.7, the fastest time that year for the 1500-meter freestyle. Don Swartz, his Marin Aquatics Coach, predicted DeMont would soon go under sixteen minutes for the 1500 event.

== World records ==
Before completing High School, Demont became a world record holder with a time of 15.52.91 in the 1500m freestyle in the Olympic Trials in Chicago on August 2, 1972. He became a world record holder in the 400m freestyle, and the first person to go under 4 minutes with a time of 3:58.18 on September 9, 1973 at the World Aquatics Championships in Beograd, Yugoslavia.

At the early August, 1972 U.S. Olympic trials in Chicago, as previously noted, DeMont placed first and set a world record time in the 1500-meter event, and also qualified in the 400-meter freestyle as well placing second behind Tom McBreen.

== 1972 Munich Olympics ==
As a 16-year-old High School student, DeMont represented the United States at the 1972 Summer Olympics in Munich, Germany. On September 1, 1972, he won a gold medal for his first-place finish (4:00.26) in the men's 400-meter freestyle, becoming the youngest male swimmer to ever win the event. A few days after the race, the International Olympic Committee (IOC) stripped DeMont of his gold medal after his post-race urinalysis tested positive for traces of the banned substance ephedrine contained in his prescription asthma medication, Marax.

The positive test following the 400-meter freestyle final also deprived him of a chance at multiple medals, as he was not permitted to swim in any other events at the 1972 Olympics, including the 1,500-meter freestyle for which he was the then-current world record-holder. Before the Olympics, DeMont had properly declared his asthma medications on his medical disclosure forms, but the U.S. Olympic Committee (USOC) had not cleared them with the IOC's medical committee.

== Collegiate swimming ==
After graduating Terra Linda High in 1973, he attended college on a swimming scholarship at the University of Washington from 1973 to 1975 under Head Coach Earl Ellis, but transferred to the University of Arizona when Washington downgraded its swimming program which faced the possibility of elimination in 1975. The program at Washington was facing budget cuts, though it persevered under Coach Ellis, who had an admirable career record in dual meets of 215-45 during his career from 1970 to 1998. At Washington DeMont swam with Olympian Robin Backhaus, one of the outstanding swimmers he had known with the Marin Aquatics Club team.

Both DeMont and fellow University of Washington swimming competitor and fellow Olympian Doug Northway, who had swum with DeMont at Marin Aquatics, transferred to the University of Arizona where DeMont had an accomplished swimming career from 1977 to 1979. After his move to Arizona, DeMont's issues with asthma greatly diminished. As a swimmer, DeMont earned All-American honors all four years of his collegiate career. He earned eight All-America honors during his two years swimming for the Arizona Wildcats where he was coached and trained by Bob Davis. Davis, who was a graduate of the University of Arizona, had led their swim team to several Western Athletic Conference titles by 1975. Davis served as one of the coaches of DeMont's Marin Aquatics Club beginning in May, 1973.

At the 1973 World Aquatics Championships in Belgrade, Yugoslavia, DeMont became the first man to swim the 400-meter freestyle in under four minutes (3:58.18). At the 1975 Pan American Games in Mexico City, Swartz won a gold medal in the 4x200 meter freestyle and a silver in the 200 meter freestyle.

== Honors ==
In 1990 DeMont was inducted into the International Swimming Hall of Fame. He was made a member of the University of Arizona Athletic Hall of Fame in 1999, and the Bay Area Sports Hall of Fame in 2008.

DeMont sued the United States Olympic Committee (USOC) in 1996 for mishandling the issues with his medication at the Munich Olympics. In 2001 the USOC admitted that it had mishandled DeMont's medical information at the 1972 Olympics and appealed to the IOC to reinstate the medal. To date, the IOC has not officially changed the race results nor overturned his ban.

== Coaching career ==
DeMont was an assistant coach for the South African men's swim team at the 2004 Summer Olympics in Athens, Greece, and the 2008 Summer Olympics in Beijing, China. While in Tucson, Arizona, he coached the Tucson Ford Dealers Swim Club for a time.

== University of Arizona coach ==
DeMont served as a coach with the University of Arizona swimming team for thirty years from 1987 to 2017, though he did not become a head coach of both the men's and women's teams until 2014. During his career at Arizona, DeMont coached Olympic gold medalists and world record holders for the 1992, 2000, 2004 and 2008 Olympics. During his time with the University, he coached 27 individual national champions from U.S. Swimming and NCAA tournaments and many championship relay squads. In 2006, DeMont's swimmers in the 400 freestyle, 400 medley and 800 freestyle NCAA Championship relay teams helped lead Arizona to a second-place finish at the NCAA Championships. He was a pioneer of negative split swimming, which is the strategy of swimming a faster second half of a race than the first half.

Outstanding swimmers DeMont has coached include Matt Grevers, and South Africans Roland Schoeman, a three-time 2004 Olympic medalist, Lyndon Ferns, a 2004 gold medalist, Darian Townsend, and Ryk Neethling.

=== Rick DeMont Swim School ===
He founded the Rick Demont Family Swim School in Tucson, Arizona in 2009 which he managed with his wife Carrie. Carrie, who received her masters from the University of Arizona in Special Education, taught swimming with the DeMont Family Swim School beginning around 2005. As another vocation, DeMont has worked as an artist and painter whose works have been shown in both local and national venues.

== See also ==
- List of members of the International Swimming Hall of Fame
- List of World Aquatics Championships medalists in swimming (men)
- World record progression 400 metres freestyle
- World record progression 1500 metres freestyle
- World record progression 4 × 100 metres freestyle relay

Records
Preceded by John Kinsella	Men's 1,500-meter freestyle world record-holder August 6 – September 4, 1972	Succeeded by Mike Burton
Preceded by Kurt Krumpholz	Men's 400-meter freestyle world record-holder September 9, 1973 – August 22, 1974	Succeeded by Tim Shaw
