= Kaye Hall =

American swimmer (born 1951)

- Hall smiling in 1968 being met in Tacoma after returning from the Mexico City Olympics

Personal information
- Full name: Kaye Marie Hall
- National team: United States
- Born: May 15, 1951 (age 75) Tacoma, Washington, U.S.
- Height: 5 ft 7 in (1.70 m)
- Weight: 143 lb (65 kg)

Sport
- Sport: Swimming
- Strokes: Backstroke
- Club: Tacoma Swim Club
- College team: University of Puget Sound
- Coach: Donald A. Duncan (Puget Sound); Dick Hannula (Tacoma Swim Club)
Medal record
Women's swimming
Representing the United States
Olympic Games
Gold medal – first place	1968 Mexico City	100 m backstroke
Gold medal – first place	1968 Mexico City	4x100 m medley
Bronze medal – third place	1968 Mexico City	200 m backstroke
Pan American Games
Silver medal – second place	1967 Winnipeg	100 m backstroke
Summer Universiade
Gold medal – first place	1970 Turin	100 m backstroke
Gold medal – first place	1970 Turin	4x100 m freestyle
Gold medal – first place	1970 Turin	4x100 m medley

Kaye Marie Hall (born May 15, 1951), later known by her married name Kaye Greff, is an American former competition swimmer, two-time Olympic champion, and former world record-holder in two events.

Hall was born in Tacoma, Washington, and attended Woodrow Wilson High School in Tacoma. She trained with the Tacoma Swim Club with Hall of Fame coach Dick Hannula who also coached Wilson High School.

Hall made her international debut at the 1967 Pan American Games in Winnipeg, where she won a silver medal in the 100-meter backstroke behind Canadian gold medalist Elaine Tanner. In December 1967, she became the first woman to swim the 100-yard backstroke in under one minute.

== Early life ==
In Tacoma, Hall was in the YWCA with her sister, and her brothers were in the YMCA where they all took swimming lessons. During this time the YWCA only had swimming lessons that did not accommodate exceptional swimming ability, unlike the YMCA. At 8, Hall was placed in more high-level swimming lessons with the boys because she was too skilled for the YWCA lessons. During this time there were no Title IX, high school, or college swimming teams for women. She could only swim in town clubs, like the Tacoma Swim Club. She traveled with Tacoma Swim Club to Canadian swim meets in Vancouver and Ocean Falls, where she met Elaine Tanner, her greatest rival during her swimming career.

== Olympics 1968 ==
As a 17-year-old, she won two gold medals and a bronze medal at the 1968 Summer Olympics in Mexico City. She won her first gold medal as a member of the winning U.S. team in women's 4×100-meter medley relay. Swimming the lead-off backstroke leg of the relay, she set a new Olympic record of 4:28.3 with American teammates Catie Ball (breaststroke), Ellie Daniel (butterfly), and Susan Pedersen (freestyle). She won a second gold in individual competition, in the women's 100-meter backstroke, recording a new world record (1:06.2) and besting Canadian Elaine Tanner by half a second (1:06.7). She added a bronze medal for her third-place finish in the women's 200-meter backstroke, finishing behind fellow American Pokey Watson (2:24.8) and Canadian Elaine Tanner (2:27.40).

== Later life ==
After the Olympics, she attended the University of Puget Sound under Hall of Fame Coach Donald A. Duncan and continued to swim for the Tacoma Swim Club with Dick Hannula. At the 1970 World University Games in Turin, Italy, she won three golds in the 100-meter backstroke and the 4×100-meter freestyle and 4×100-meter medley relays. In 1967, Hall became the first woman to break the one minute mark in the 100-yard backstroke, a significant milestone for a difficult stroke. She is a member of the International Swimming and the Washington State Sports Hall of Fame. She retired from competitive swimming in 1970.

Hall was inducted into the International Swimming Hall of Fame as an "Honor Swimmer" in 1979. She is also a member of the Puget Sound University Athletic Hall of Fame and the Washington State Sports Hall of Fame.

She is married, and has two kids and six grandchildren. She now works as an art teacher in a suburb of Seattle.

== See also ==
- List of Olympic medalists in swimming (women)
- World record progression 100 metres backstroke
- World record progression 4 × 100 metres medley relay
