= Swimming at the 1970 Summer Universiade =

Swimming at the VI Summer Universiade

The swimming competition at the 1970 Summer Universiade took place in Turin, Italy in August 1970.

== Men's events ==
Event	Gold		Silver		Bronze	
100 m freestyle	Frank Heckl; United States	53.2	Dan Frawley; United States	53.4	Leonid Ilyichov; Soviet Union	53.9
400 m freestyle	Andy Strenk; United States	4:12.1	Steve Genter; United States	4:13.6	Vladimir Bure; Soviet Union	4:17.9
1500 m freestyle	Andy Strenk; United States	16:43.1	Steve Genter; United States	17:01.1	Władysław Wojtakajtis; Poland	17:34.9
100 m backstroke	Mitch Ivey; United States	59.4	Charlie Campbell; United States	59.5	Mike Richards; Great Britain	1:01.7
200 m backstroke	Mitch Ivey; United States	2:09.3	Charlie Campbell; United States	2:09.6	Mike Richards; Great Britain	2:15.0
100 m breaststroke	Nikolai Pankin; Soviet Union	1:07.1	Nobutaka Taguchi; Japan	1:07.5	Mike Dirksen; United States	1:08.6
200 m breaststroke	Rick Colella; United States	2:25.5	Nikolai Pankin; Soviet Union	2:28.4	Nobutaka Taguchi; Japan	2:29.4
100 m butterfly	John Ferris; United States	57.5	Jerry Heidenreich; United States	57.7	Yasuo Takada; Japan	59.2
200 m butterfly	John Ferris; United States	2:07.8	Yasuo Takada; Japan	2:09.2	Ken Weinfeld; United States	2:10.2
400 m individual medley	Steve Power; United States	4:46.1	Rick Colella; United States	4:48.8	Reinhard Merkel; West Germany	4:56.5
4×100 m freestyle relay	United States (USA); Don Havens; Jim McConica; Dave O'Mallay; Frank Heckl	3:33.3	Soviet Union (URS)	3:36.1	Great Britain (GBR)	3:45.8
4×200 m freestyle relay	United States (USA); Andy Strenk; Dave O'Mallay; Jim McConica; Frank Heckl	7:53.7	Soviet Union (URS)	8:08.0	Great Britain (GBR)	8:26.0
4×100 m medley relay	United States (USA); Mitch Ivey; Ken Shilling; John Ferris; Frank Heckl	3:59.9	Soviet Union (URS)	4:03.9	Japan (JPN)	4:05.8

Legend: CR – Championship record; CWR – Commonwealth record; NR – National record

== Women's events ==
Event	Gold		Silver		Bronze	
100 m freestyle	Mirjana Šegrt; Yugoslavia	1:00.9	Marsha McCuen; United States	1:01.1	Laura Fritz; United States	1:02.1
400 m freestyle	Evelyn Kossner; United States	4:43.7	Kathy Thomas; United States	4:49.9	Sandra Smith; Canada	4:53.9
100 m backstroke	Kaye Hall; United States	1:07.3	Lynn Skrifvars; United States	1:11.0	Tinatin Lekveishvili; Soviet Union	1:11.4
100 m breaststroke	Galina Stepanova; Soviet Union	1:16.7	Alla Grebennikova; Soviet Union	1:18.1	Linda Kurtz; United States	1:18.9
200 m breaststroke	Galina Stepanova; Soviet Union	2:45.4	Linda Kurtz; United States	2:49.4	Alla Grebennikova; Soviet Union	2:49.6
100 m butterfly	Lynn Colella; United States; Mirjana Šegrt; Yugoslavia	1:06.0	Not Awarded		Ellie Daniel; United States	1:06.9
200 m individual medley	Lynn Colella; United States	2:31.4	Lidiya Milenina; Soviet Union	2:32.1	Kathy Thomas; United States	2:34.5
4×100 m freestyle relay	United States (USA); Marsha McCuen; Benoit; Kaye Hall; Laura Fritz	4:09.5	Yugoslavia (YUG)	4:20.2	Great Britain (GBR)	4:21.6
4×100 m medley relay	United States (USA); Kaye Hall; Linda Kurtz; Lynn Colella; Marsha McCuen	4:35.1	Soviet Union (URS)	4:41.6	Yugoslavia (YUG)	4:43.3

Legend: CR – Championship record; CWR – Commonwealth record; NR – National record

== Medal table ==
Rank	Nation	Gold	Silver	Bronze	Total
1	United States (USA)	18	11	6	35
2	Soviet Union (URS)	3	7	4	14
3	Yugoslavia (YUG)	2	1	1	4
4	Japan (JPN)	0	2	3	5
5	Great Britain (GBR)	0	0	5	5
6	Canada (CAN)	0	0	1	1
6	Poland (POL)	0	0	1	1
6	West Germany (FRG)	0	0	1	1
Totals (8 entries)		23	21	22	66
