= Mitch Ivey =

American swimmer and coach (born 1949)

Personal information
- Full name: Mitchell Ivey
- Nickname: "Mitch"
- National team: United States
- Born: February 2, 1949 (age 77) San Jose, California, U.S.
- Height: 5 ft 11 in (1.80 m)
- Weight: 159 lb (72 kg)

Sport
- Sport: Swimming
- Strokes: Backstroke
- Club: Santa Clara Swim Club
- College team: California State University, Long Beach
Medal record
Men's swimming
Representing United States
Summer Olympics
Silver medal – second place	1968 Mexico	200 m backstroke
Bronze medal – third place	1972 Munich	200 m backstroke
Universiade
Gold medal – first place	1970 Turin	100 m backstroke
Gold medal – first place	1970 Turin	200 m backstroke
Gold medal – first place	1970 Turin	4x100 m medley

Mitchell Ivey (born February 2, 1949) is an American former international swimmer who was a backstroke specialist and Olympic medalist. Ivey later became a prominent Olympic and college swimming coach.

== Early years ==
He was born in San Jose, California, and trained with the Santa Clara Swim Club under coach George Haines. As a member of the Santa Clara Swim Club, he won three Amateur Athletic Union (AAU) United States national championships. He initially attended Stanford University, but transferred to California State University, Long Beach, where he swam for coach Don Gambril's Long Beach State 49ers swim team in National Collegiate Athletic Association (NCAA) competition. Ivey won the 200-yard backstroke at the NCAA Men's Swimming and Diving Championships with a time of 1:52.77 in 1970, and graduated from Long Beach State in 1972.

== Olympic career ==
Ivey participated in two Olympics as a member of the United States Olympic Team: the 1968 Summer Olympics in Mexico City, and the 1972 Summer Olympics in Munich, Germany, winning two Olympic medals. He won a silver medal by finishing second behind Roland Matthes in the men's 200-meter backstroke in 1968. He also won a bronze medal with a third-place finish in the 200-meter backstroke, and competed in the 100-meter backstroke, placing fourth in the finals at the 1972 Olympics. He swam for the gold medal-winning U.S. relay team in the preliminary heats of the men's 4×100-meter medley, but was ineligible to receive a medal under the 1972 Olympic swimming rules because he did not swim in the event final.

== Coaching career ==
Ivey became a noted Olympic and college swimming coach after his own competition swimming career ended. From 1974 to 1979, he was the head coach of the Santa Clara Swim Club, succeeding George Haines. Three of his Santa Clara swimmers qualified for the 1976 Summer Olympics. In 1981, he became the head coach of the Concord Pleasant Hill Swim Club. From late 1988 to mid-1990, he coached the elite Etobicoke Swim Club in Toronto, Ontario. He served as an assistant coach for the U.S. Olympic Team at the 1988 Summer Olympics. Ivey was chosen to replace Randy Reese as the head coach of the Florida Gators swimming and diving team of the University of Florida, and led the Gators women's team from 1990 to 1993. During his three seasons as Florida's coach, the Lady Gators swimmers won the Southeastern Conference (SEC) championship three consecutive years, and finished third, third and second nationally at the NCAA Women's Swimming and Diving Championships. He was also recognized as the SEC Coach of the Year for three consecutive seasons.

The University of Florida Athletic Association released him in October 1993 following an episode of the ESPN television show Outside the Lines which recounted Ivey's history of romantic involvement with several of his previous swimmers before he became a coach at the University of Florida, and made allegations of sexual harassment against him. Ivey had been previously married three times, including his second wife who was an 18-year-old swimmer at the time he married her. Ivey denied the charges of misconduct, saying "I was told that putting my arm around a girl and using foul language was deemed reason enough [for the University of Florida to fire him]." ESPN did not interview Ivey, nor did he answer on air any of the allegations by ESPN. His Florida women's swimmers issued a unanimous statement supporting him, and stated publicly they did not complain about nor witness any inappropriate behavior.

Ivey later coached the Trinity Prep Saints swimming and diving team of Trinity Preparatory School in Winter Park, Florida, and its affiliated club team, Trinity Prep Aquatics, during the late 1990s. Most recently, from 2003 to 2006, Ivey coached swimming at the Episcopal School of Jacksonville, Florida.

Suzette Moran, who was also coached by King, alleges in a lawsuit she was 16 when U.S. Olympic coach Mitch Ivey first made sexual advances toward her. Ivey, a two-time Olympic medalist who coached at Concord Pleasant Hill Swim Club at the time, allegedly went into her hotel room and had unwanted sex with her during the 1983 U.S. Championships in Indianapolis on a trip chaperoned by King.

On December 24, 2013, USA Swimming, the national governing body for competition swimming in the United States, officially banned Ivey for life based on evidence that he had improper sexual relations with one or more swimmers while he was their coach.

== Personal life ==
Ivey is the father of Jeb Ivey, a former professional basketball player.

== See also ==
- List of California State University, Long Beach people
- List of Olympic medalists in swimming (men)
- Long Beach State 49ers
- Stanford Cardinal
