= Xavier Cooper =

American football player (born 1991)

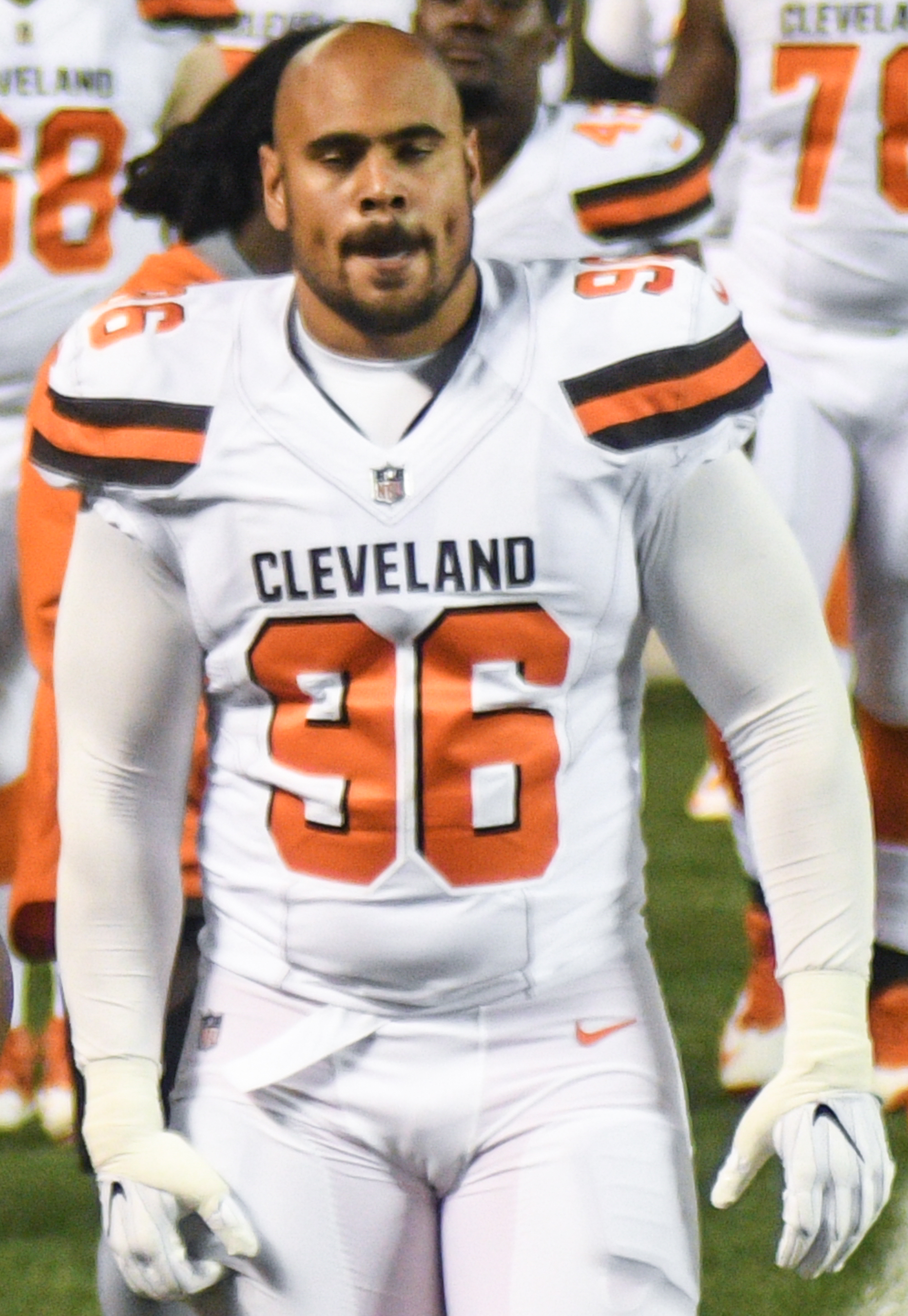
- Cooper with the Cleveland Browns in 2017

No. 75, 96
- Position: Defensive tackle

Personal information
- Born: November 30, 1991 (age 34); Tacoma, Washington, U.S.
- Listed height: 6 ft 4 in (1.93 m)
- Listed weight: 300 lb (136 kg)

Career information
- High school: Woodrow Wilson (Tacoma)
- College: Washington State
- NFL draft: 2015: 3rd round, 96th overall pick

Career history
- Cleveland Browns (2015–2016); San Francisco 49ers (2017); New York Jets (2017)

Career NFL statistics
- Total tackles: 56
- Sacks: 3
- Stats at Pro Football Reference

Xavier Cooper (born November 30, 1991) is an American former professional football player who was a defensive end in the National Football League (NFL). He played college football for the Washington State Cougars, and was selected by the Cleveland Browns in the third round of the 2015 NFL draft.

== Early life ==
Cooper was born in Tacoma, Washington, in 1991 to Louis Cooper, Jr. and his wife, Dawn Cooper. His father works for the Port of Tacoma, and was a former NAIA football All-American at Doane College in Crete, Nebraska. His mother is a social worker, and he has a sister, Keysha.

Cooper was an athletic child, working out and playing sports at the local YMCA. Zachary Smalls, a friend of his father's and a former standout Washington State University football receiver in the 1980s, ran a speed and agility training camp for athletes 12 years old and up. Impressed with Cooper's speed, Smalls admitted the boy to his training camp even though Cooper was only 10 years old.

Cooper's parents, both of whom have master's degrees, realized early on that their son had a moderate learning disability. His reading comprehension was minimal, and he learned best through kinesthetic learning (doing, experiencing, moving, or touching). Although Xavier was excited by sports, he was disinterested in school, so the Coopers allowed him to play sports only if he continued to go to school and study. Initially, he enjoyed AAU basketball and soccer, and was an excellent player due to his size and speed. He did not begin playing football until the ninth grade.

Cooper's secondary education was at Woodrow Wilson High School in Tacoma. He played both basketball and football in high school, but excelled in football. Cooper began taking three special education classes in his freshman year. Nicknamed "X", Cooper was initially embarrassed by having to enroll in these courses, even though he had teammates sitting next to him in class. Although he overcame the embarrassment, he was taunted by his classmates.

Despite his parents' encouragement, Cooper often skipped classes and his grades were poor. College football scouts, impressed with his athleticism, declined to recruit him, concluding that his academic struggles made him a high risk to drop out of college or fail to graduate. Cooper also did poorly on his ACT and SAT college admission exams.

Cooper resolved to attend a junior college, until Mike Levenseller, a neighbor and former football coaching assistant at Washington State University (WSU), suggested "gray-shirting"—a process whereby Cooper would enroll at a Washington community college, taking classes that would enable him to enroll at WSU without passing entrance exams. Cooper subsequently enrolled at Tacoma Community College, which delayed his entry at WSU from September 2010 to January 2011. Cooper was angry that he had to sit out his 2010 season, but became reconciled to it.

== College career ==
Cooper received a football scholarship from Washington State. He was redshirted at Washington State, attending classes, practicing with the football team, and dressing for play but not competing in games. He was strongly mentored by Heather Erwin, an academic advisor at WSU who worked extensively with Cooper to ensure that he went to classes, studied hard, discussed assignments with professors, asked for extra credit, and engaged in study habits that met his particular kinesthetic learning needs. By May 2015, Cooper was just eight credit hours short of a degree in criminal justice. (Cooper has said he intends to finish his college degree after his NFL rookie season, and then obtain a master's degree so that he can become a principal after his career ends.)

As a redshirt freshman during the 2011 season, Cooper so impressed coaches with his dedication to practice that he was named an All-Pac-12 Conference honorable mention. During his sophomore year (2012 season), he started the last nine of the 12 games, and played (but did not start) in two more. During Cooper's junior year, he started all 13 games, helping make WSU the 10th-best defense in the nation. He made 13.5 tackles (3.5 of them against Idaho), and led Washington State in tackles-for-a-loss. Cooper was dominating during the 2014 season. He started all 12 games, made 37 tackles (9.5 of them for loss, best on the team), and had five sacks (second best on the team). During WSU's near-upset of the Oregon Ducks on September 20, 2014, Cooper had 1.5 sacks.

Although Cooper had one more year of college eligibility left, he entered the 2015 NFL draft. He totalled 121 career tackles, 31.5 of them for loss (the eighth highest number of tackles for a loss in WSU football history) and 13 career sacks. He forced three fumbles in three years, recovering two of them and returning one for a touchdown.

== Professional career ==
=== Pre-draft ===
Cooper attended the 2015 NFL Combine, where he helped his stock for the draft by running the 40-yard dash in 4.86 seconds—the fastest for a defensive lineman at the event.

=== Cleveland Browns ===
The Cleveland Browns drafted Cooper in the third round of the 2015 NFL draft. He was the first WSU defensive lineman to be drafted in the NFL since Rien Long in 2003, and was the highest-drafted WSU defensive lineman since Dorian Boose in 1998. On May 11, 2015, Cooper signed a four-year contract worth $2.96 million.

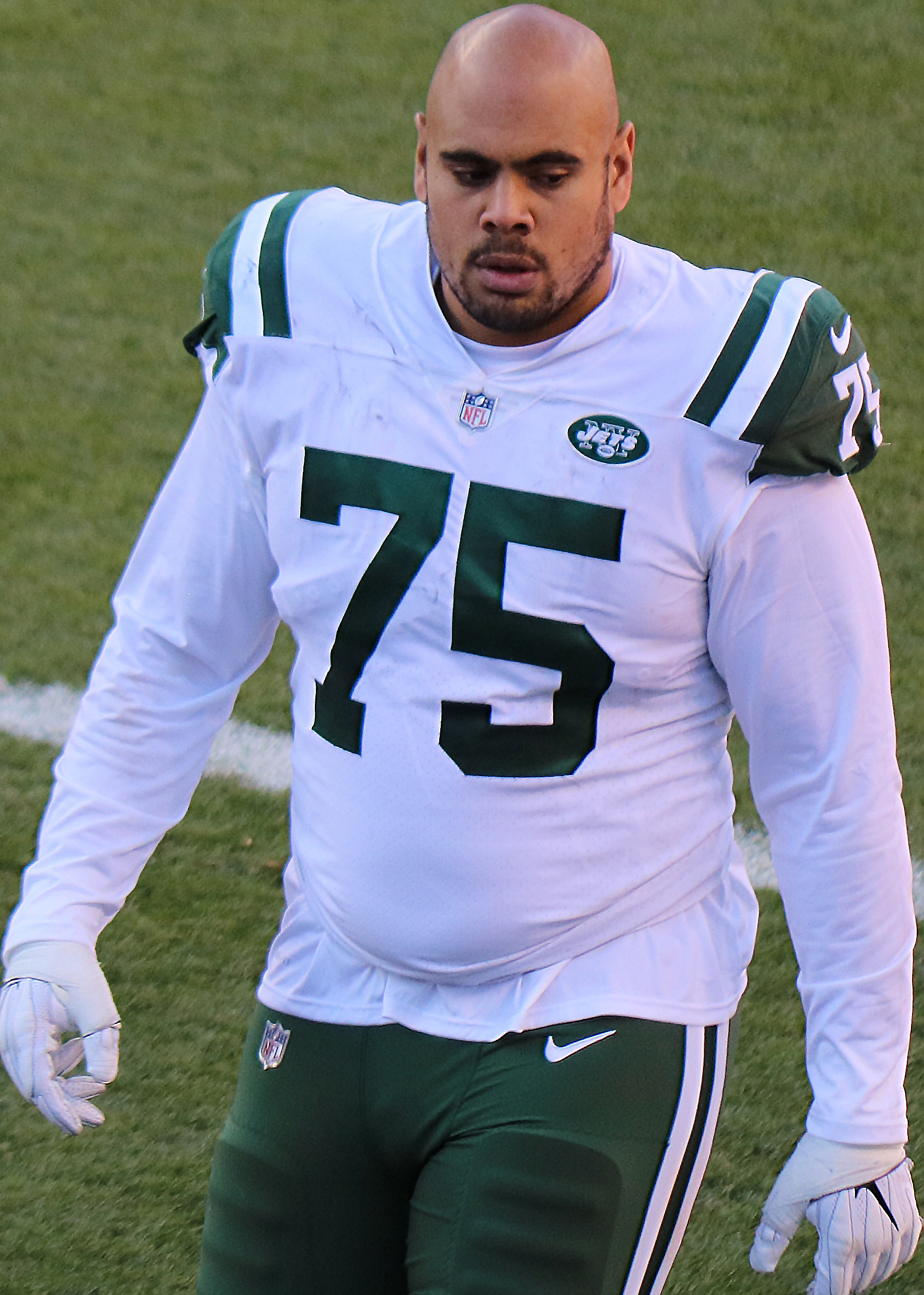
Cooper with the Jets in 2017.

The Browns declared Cooper a healthy inactive several times in the 2016 season. On September 2, 2017, he was waived by the Browns.

=== San Francisco 49ers ===
On September 3, 2017, Cooper was claimed off waivers by the San Francisco 49ers. He was released by the 49ers on October 24, 2017.

=== New York Jets ===
On October 31, 2017, Cooper signed with the New York Jets.

On March 19, 2018, Cooper re-signed with the Jets. He was released on August 31, 2018.
