= Silas High School =

Public high school in Tacoma, Washington, US

Location
- 1202 N. Orchard St. Tacoma, Washington 98406; United States; 47°15′41″N 122°30′26″W

Information
- Type: Public High School Secondary education
- Motto: "Developing Confident, Contributing Citizens"
- Established: 1958
- School district: Tacoma Public Schools
- NCES School ID: 530870001513
- Principal: Bernadette Ray
- Teaching staff: 50.39 (FTE)
- Grades: 9–12
- Enrollment: 1,160 (2024–2025)
- Student to teacher ratio: 23.02
- Colors: Red, White & Blue
- Mascot: Rams
- Nickname: RedSilas
- Yearbook: NOVA
- Website: silas.tacomaschools.org

Silas High School is a four-year public secondary school in Tacoma, Washington. It is one of five traditional high schools in the Tacoma Public Schools and is located at the intersection of Orchard Street and 11th Street. Silas' current principal is Bernadette Ray. The school was formerly named Woodrow Wilson High School from its founding in 1958 until July 2021 after a wave of name changes following the 2020 racial protests that swept the world.

Its attendance boundary includes Ruston.

== HillTop artists ==
Dale Chihuly, a glass artist who graduated from the school, established HillTop Artists, a glass-working program at Silas. For a $20 fee, students can blow glass, make glass beads, and participate in kiln work. This program is run by glass artists who trained with Chihuly at the Pilchuck Glass School.

== Daffodil Festival ==
Every year, Silas participates in the Pierce County Daffodil Festival. A competition is held in-house to select the Silas Princess. The Princess must have at least a 3.5 GPA and must be a senior. She will go on to compete against other regional schools for the Daffodil Festival Queen title. The Queen title is considered the highest honor of the regional festival. In April, the Silas band accompanies the Princesses on a float in the annual parade.

== Name change ==
In 2020, two Tacoma Public Schools principals proposed renaming Woodrow Wilson High School and other schools in response to public outcry due to their association with controversial historic figures. Woodrow Wilson, the school's namesake, was a segregationist who had sympathized with the Ku Klux Klan and held pro-Confederacy views. A public survey circulated to 3,900 respondents in September 2020 was returned with 43 percent in favor of renaming the school and 57 percent in favor of retaining Wilson's name. On February 11, 2021, Tacoma Public Schools Board of Directors approved a plan to rename the school for Dr. Dolores Silas, the first Black woman to serve as a school administrator and city council member in Tacoma. The official renaming to Silas High School took effect on July 1 and is planned to take 18 months to fully transition, at a cost of $400,000 to replace signage and uniforms.

== Sports ==
Silas participates in Cross Country, Girls' Soccer, Football, Girls' Swimming, Boys' Tennis, Girls' Volleyball, Boys' Water Polo, Boys' Basketball Girls' Basketball, Boys' Swimming, Girls' Bowling, Wrestling, Project Unify, Boys' Baseball, Girls' Fastpitch, Boys' Soccer, Girls' Tennis, Golf, Girls' Water Polo, and Track. The Silas Boys Swimming and Diving team has won 29 State titles, with 24 consecutive titles between 1960 and 1983. The Boys Water Polo Team has won 4 state Titles. The Girls Bowling team has won 3 State Titles. The Boys Track And Field Team has won 6 State Titles. The Baseball team won 1 State title in 1977. The Boys Golf Team has won 2 State titles.

== Notable alumni ==
Name	Grad Class	Category	Best Known For
Dale Chihuly	1959	artist	glass artist
Ted Bundy	1965	serial killer	American serial killer (1946–1989)
Kaye Hall		Athletics	1968 Olympic gold and bronze medalist in women's swimming
Leo Randolph,		Athletics	1976 Olympic gold medalist in boxing
Joey Gjertsen	2000	Athletics	midfielder for the San Jose Earthquakes
Xavier Cooper	2010	Athletics	defensive tackle for the Cleveland Browns.
Dick Hannula		Athletics	former swimming coach, won 24 consecutive state swimming titles, 1960–1983
Darrell Robinson		Athletics	holder of the 400-meter national high school track record (44.69 seconds) since July 24, 1982
Geoff Tate			lead singer of the Grammy-nominated band Queensrÿche
Desmond Trufant		Athletics	cornerback for the Chicago Bears, first-round selection in 2013 NFL draft
Isaiah Trufant		Athletics	former cornerback for the Cleveland Browns
Marcus Trufant		Athletics	former cornerback for the Seattle Seahawks
Clyde Werner		Athletics	former linebacker for the Kansas City Chiefs
John Zamberlin		Athletics	former linebacker for the New England Patriots and Kansas City Chiefs; former head coach at Idaho State University
