= Doug Northway =

American swimmer (born 1955)

Personal information
- Full name: Douglas Dale Northway
- Nickname: "Doug"
- National team: United States
- Born: April 28, 1955 (age 71) Ontario, California, U.S.
- Height: 5 ft 11 in (1.80 m) '72; 6 ft 2 in (1.88 m) '76
- Weight: 160 lb (73 kg)

Sport
- Sport: Swimming
- Strokes: Freestyle
- Club: Pima County Dolphins; Oasis Aquatic Club (Tucson)
- College team: University of Washington; University of Arizona
- Coach: Earl Ellis (Washington); Bob Davis (U. Arizona)
Medal record
Men's swimming
Representing the United States
Olympic Games
Bronze medal – third place	1972 Munich	1500 m freestyle
Pan American Games
Gold medal – first place	1975 Mexico City	400 m freestyle

Douglas Dale Northway (born April 28, 1955) is an American former swimmer, who competed for the University of Washington and then the University of Arizona, and represented the United States at the 1972 Munich and 1976 Montreal Olympic Games. He won a bronze in the 1500-meter freestyle in the 1972 Olympics, and swam an Olympic and world record time in the preliminaries of the 4x200 freestyle relays at the 1976 Mexico City Olympics. His qualifying preliminary heat led the American Men's 4x200 freestyle relay team to a gold medal in the 1976 Olympic finals, though he did not swim with the final team. He was a world record holder in the 400-meter freestyle in April, 1976.

== High school era swimming ==
Born on April 28, 1955, in Ontario, California, to Mr. and Mrs. Mervyn Northway, Douglas swam and trained with California's Claremont Crocodiles Swim Club under Coach John Reese from the age of around seven. The exercise improved his breathing and helped him deal with his asthma.

=== Sahuaro high school ===
After a move to Arizona in 1969 at 14, Northway attended Tucson's Sahuaro High School where he was coached by Dick Cooper. Northway helped lead the Suhuaro High swimming team to the 1972 Southern AAA Championships and Class AAA State Championships, and was a High School All American by his Junior year. His National Interscholastic Swimming Coaching Association All American status was a result of his 3:44.1 time in the 400-yard freestyle. With great depth and diversity in the swimming events in which he could compete, Northway entered 7 of a possible 9 events at the AAA Championships. By 17, Northway's best event was likely the 200 freestyle, where in 1972 he was on the honorary first team for the Tucson Daily Citizen. The 200 would remain a primary distance in his Olympic quests.

He did the majority of his focused training with Tucson Arizona's Pima County Dolphins under Head Coach Bob Davis and later swam for Tucson's Oasis Aquatic Club in the mid-70's. Bob Davis started the Dolphins in 1967, and was also an accomplished coach for the University of Arizona beginning in the early 1970s. When Davis moved to the Marin County Athletic Club in May, 1973, Northway followed him for the summer, though soon was busy with collegiate competition in the Fall.

Northway swam a 16:11.62 for the 1500-meter event, placing second at the Los Angeles Invitational after Rick DeMont, a world record holder in the event, who finished a full eight seconds ahead. Northway also swam highly competitive times in the 200 and 400 freestyles. The 1500 win set up Northway as an excellent Olympic trials' candidate.

Northway's pre-Olympic training regiment consisted of swimming 3–4 hours daily, training primarily with his Pima County Dolphin Coach Bob Davis.

== 1972-1976 Olympics ==
Northway represented the United States in the 1972 Munich and 1976 Montreal Olympics.

=== 1972 Munich Olympic bronze ===
At the August, 1972 Olympic trials in Chicago, Northway swam a qualifying 15.57.68 for the 1500-meter event, a career best time. He placed second in the 1500 behind Rick Demont, who broke the world record with a time of 15:52.91. Northway swam the second fastest time in the world for 1972 in the event, and came within 5 tenths of a second of the former world record of 15:57.1. Northway placed fourth in the 400 freestyle at the trials with a time of 4:02.84. Northway trained with the U.S. team at Westpoint, Virginia. The Men's head coach for the U.S. Olympic team that year was Peter Daland.

Northway arrived at the Olympic Village in Munich on August 20, 1972. As a 17-year-old at the 1972 Summer Olympics in Munich, Germany, he received a bronze medal for his third-place performance in the men's 1,500-meter freestyle (16:09.25). Mike Burton, a former Carmichael, California swimmer for Sherm Chavoor's Arden Hills swim team, won the event with a world record time of 15:52.58, and Australian Graham Windeatt took second.

Northway's participation in the 1972 Munich 1500 Olympic final event may have been overshadowed by the disqualification of the world record holder in the event, Rick Demont as a result of doping charges on September 4, 1972. Demont stated that his asthma medication Ephedrine was the reason he failed the drug test, and that he had mentioned taking the medication on his olympic entry forms.

=== 1976 Montreal Olympics ===
At the 1976 Summer Olympics in Montreal, Quebec, he swam for the gold medal-winning U.S. team in the preliminary heats of the men's 4×200-meter freestyle relay. Swimming the leadoff 200-meter leg, Northway's relay team swam a combined world record time of 7:30.33 with Tim Shaw of Long Beach, Mike Bruner, and Bruce Furniss. Northway swam a 1:51.65 for his leg. The time was four seconds better than the Olympic record for the event set in 1972. Northway did not receive a medal for his 1976 relay effort, however, because only relay swimmers who competed in the event final were medal-eligible under the rules then in effect.

Northway qualified for the 4x200 freestyle relay at the 1980 Moscow Olympic trials, but they were cancelled due to an Olympic boycott. After 1980, he had a successful four-year career in professional swimming, first or second-place finishes in the 1984 Traversee Internationale du lac Memphremagagog, Traversee Internationale de Lac St. Jean in July, 1984, and the 1984 Cabo San Lucas Marathon Swim, a 24-mile event.

=== College era swimming ===
==== University of Washington ====
Northway attended and swam for the University of Washington Huskies in the Fall of 1973 through 1975 where he was managed by American Swimming Coaches Association (ASCAA) Hall of Fame Coach Earl Ellis. Rick DeMont, a world champion in the 1500-meter swim, would be on the University of Washington swim team with Northway, and they would become friends. Northway's training was hampered in 1973 by a bout of mononucleosis. Swimming for Washington under Coach Earl Ellis at the 1973 NCAA Swimming and Diving Championships at Long Beach, Northway recorded a 12th place for the 500 freestyle with a time of 4:34.1.

==== University of Arizona ====
In the Fall of 1975, Northway transferred to the University of Arizona where he would swim at least through 1978 for Head Coach Bob Davis, his former coach at the Pima County Dolphins. He decided to leave the University of Washington by April, 1975 due to proposed cutbacks in the swimming program. By 1975, the University of Arizona under Bob Davis had taken 4 consecutive Western Athletic Conference titles. In February 1977, swimming for the University of Arizona, Northway placed second in the 1650 freestyle with a 15:58, first in the 200 free with a time of 1:41.675, and first in the 4x100 freestyle relay with a combined team time of 3:10.585, helping Arizona to take the team title at the Arizona Invitational.

=== International competition ===
At the 1975 Pan-American Games, Northway won the 400-meter freestyle event, taking the gold medal. At the 1976 National AAU indoor swimming championships at Belmont Pool in Long Beach, Northway won the 400-meter event with a time of 3:56.48. Northway held the lead throughout the race.

Northway won the 400-meter freestyle competition at the early April, 1976 U.S. Outdoor Long Course Nationals in Long Beach with a world record time of 3:56.48 and was third in the 200 freestyle. He beat his formal personal best time in the event. He grew from 5'11" at the 1972 Olympics to 6' 2" for the 1976 Olympics, and benefitted from a carefully planned weight training program. In January 1976, Northway won two events and broke two Arizona state state records, with a 47.9 in the 100-yard freestyle and a 1:41 in the 200-yard freestyle at the Deb Secrist Invitational Swimming Meet at the University of Arizona.

In 1981 he competed in the New Zealand Games, taking medals in the 100 and 200 freestyle, and won the 100-freestyle at the Australia Speedo International Event. He swam professionally through around 1985, often focusing on open water and long-distance races. Northway won the Traversée internationale du lac St-Jean on July 19, 1984, having attempted the long distance swim in three prior years, but being unable to finish due to hypothermia. The marathon swim is 32 kilometers, or 19.8 miles long, and swum in Lake St. Jean between Peribonka and Roberval, Quebec, Canada. Northway led the race from start to finish, finishing in 7 hours, 37 minutes.

==== Honors ====
Northway was inducted into the University of Arizona Athletic Hall of Fame.

He was the Arizona Daily Star's Athlete of the Year in 1972. He was Captain of the All Southwest Swimming Team for the Southwest Sports News Service in 1972.

==== Later life ====
In June, 1996, Northway was living in Tucson with his wife Linda and three young children. He coached swimming at Ventana Canyon, was a licensed minister, an associate pastor at a church, and taught Spanish to elementary students at Grace Christian School. He was studying for a master's degree in Bilingual special education at University of Arizona.

Northway plead guilty to molesting a child in 1995. In June, 1997, he was sentenced to four months in jail, four months of home arrest, and a lifetime probation.

Northway has since worked in accounting in Tucson and as an advisor for QuickBooks Professional, a software accounting application. He may have also worked for Phoenix College as an instructor.

=== See also ===
- List of Olympic medalists in swimming (men)
- List of University of Arizona people
- World record progression 4 × 200 metres freestyle relay

=== External links ===
- Evans, Hilary; Gjerde, Arild; Heijmans, Jeroen; Mallon, Bill; et al. "Doug Northway". Olympics at Sports-Reference.com. Sports Reference LLC. Archived from the original on January 27, 2012.
- Pima County Sports Hall of Fame, Northway's Coach Bob Davis
- Munatones, Steven, Open Water Swimming.com, Doug Northway, An Unexpected Triumph In The 1984 Traversée
- Olympics.com biography, Douglas Northway
