= Aberdeen High School (Washington) =

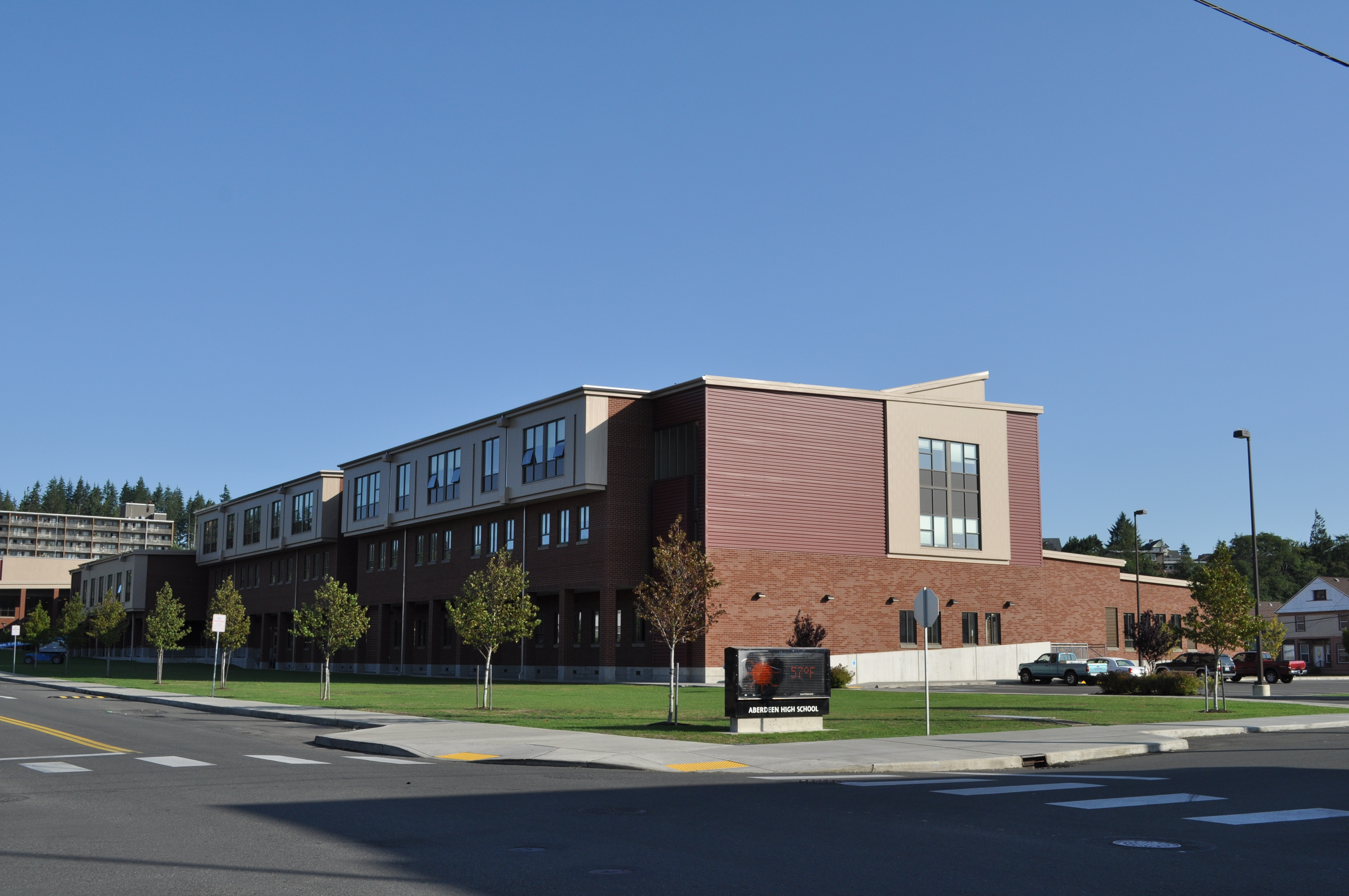

Location
- 410 North G Street; Aberdeen, Washington; United States; 46.98°N 123.818°W

Information
- Type: Public
- Established: 1908; 118 years ago
- School district: Aberdeen School District
- Principal: Aaron Roiko
- Teaching staff: 45.06 (on an FTE basis)
- Grades: 9–12
- Enrollment: 919 (2024–2025)
- Student to teacher ratio: 20.40
- Colors: Blue and gold
- Mascot: Bobcat
- Website: ahs.asd5.org

J. M. Weatherwax High School, commonly referred to as Aberdeen High School, is a four-year public high school located in Aberdeen, Washington, the flagship of the Aberdeen School District. The AHS mascot is the Bobcat.

== Demographics ==
As of the 2012–2013 school year, there were 868-926 students enrolled, 52.3% of which were male, and 47.7% female. 65.2% of the students were White, 22.6% Hispanic/Latino, 3.8% American Indian, 6.2% Asian-American, and 0.8% African American. There were 52 classroom teachers, for an average of 16.7 students per teacher in May 2013.

== Sports ==
Aberdeen competes in WIAA Class 2A, and is a member of the Evergreen Conference in District Four. School sponsored sports include: Football, Baseball, Basketball, Soccer, Wrestling, Tennis, Cross Country, Track and Field, Golf, Swimming, Fastpitch, Volleyball, and girls Bowling.

=== State championships ===
- Boys Basketball: 1982
- Girls Swimming & Diving: 2008, 2009
- Boys Track and Field: 1963, 1964

== Fire ==
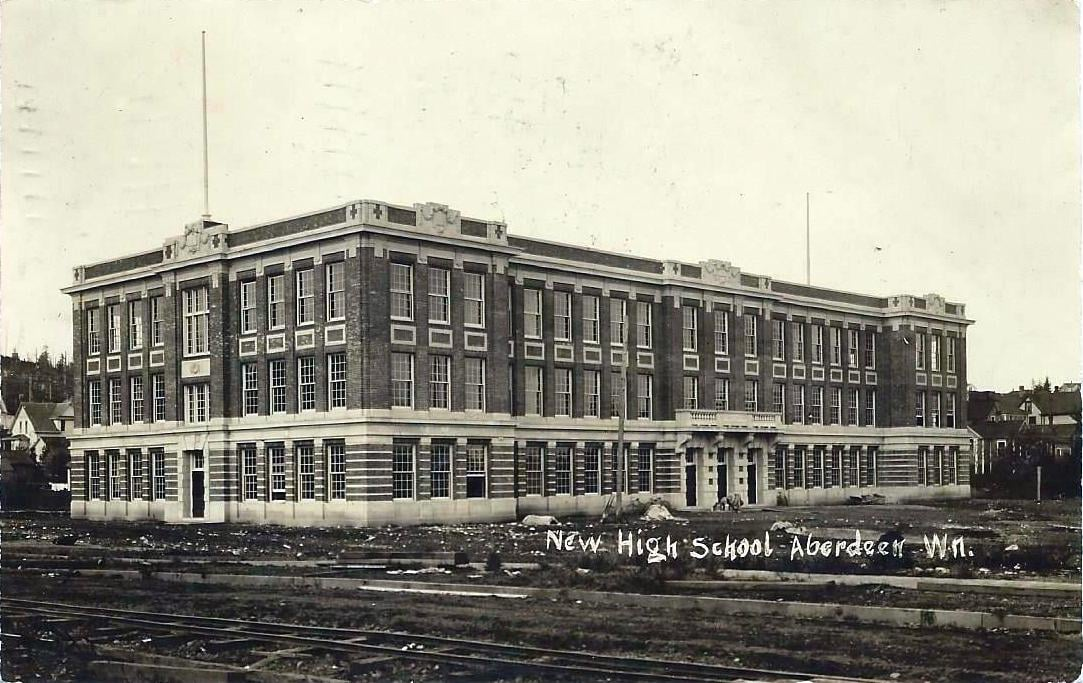
Weatherwax building postcard Nov, 1910.

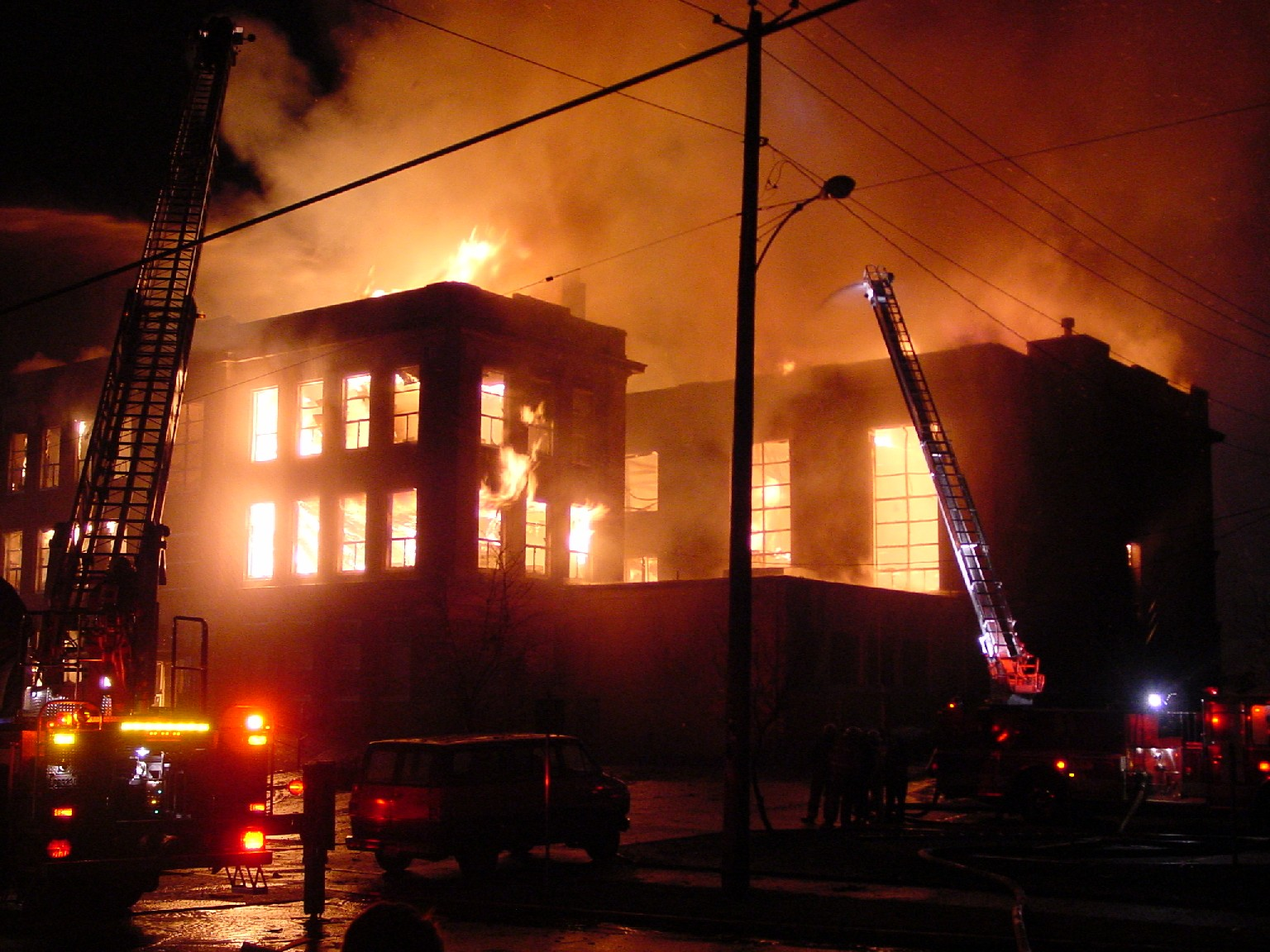
The Weatherwax building of Aberdeen High School burned down in 2002

On Saturday, 5 January 2002, the Weatherwax building of Aberdeen High School, one of Aberdeen's most historic buildings (built in 1909), burned to the ground just after midnight. The Weatherwax building housed the school library, counseling office, and many classrooms. Students were spread out over the remaining campus until the new school was built.

The grand opening of the new building and official dedication ceremony was held on August 25, 2007. The new high school building is now open for the school year, starting 4 September 2007. Parts of the masonry from the original Weatherwax building have been incorporated into the walls of the current one, including an old concrete sign reading "J. M. Weatherwax" inside the main entrance.

== Notable alumni ==
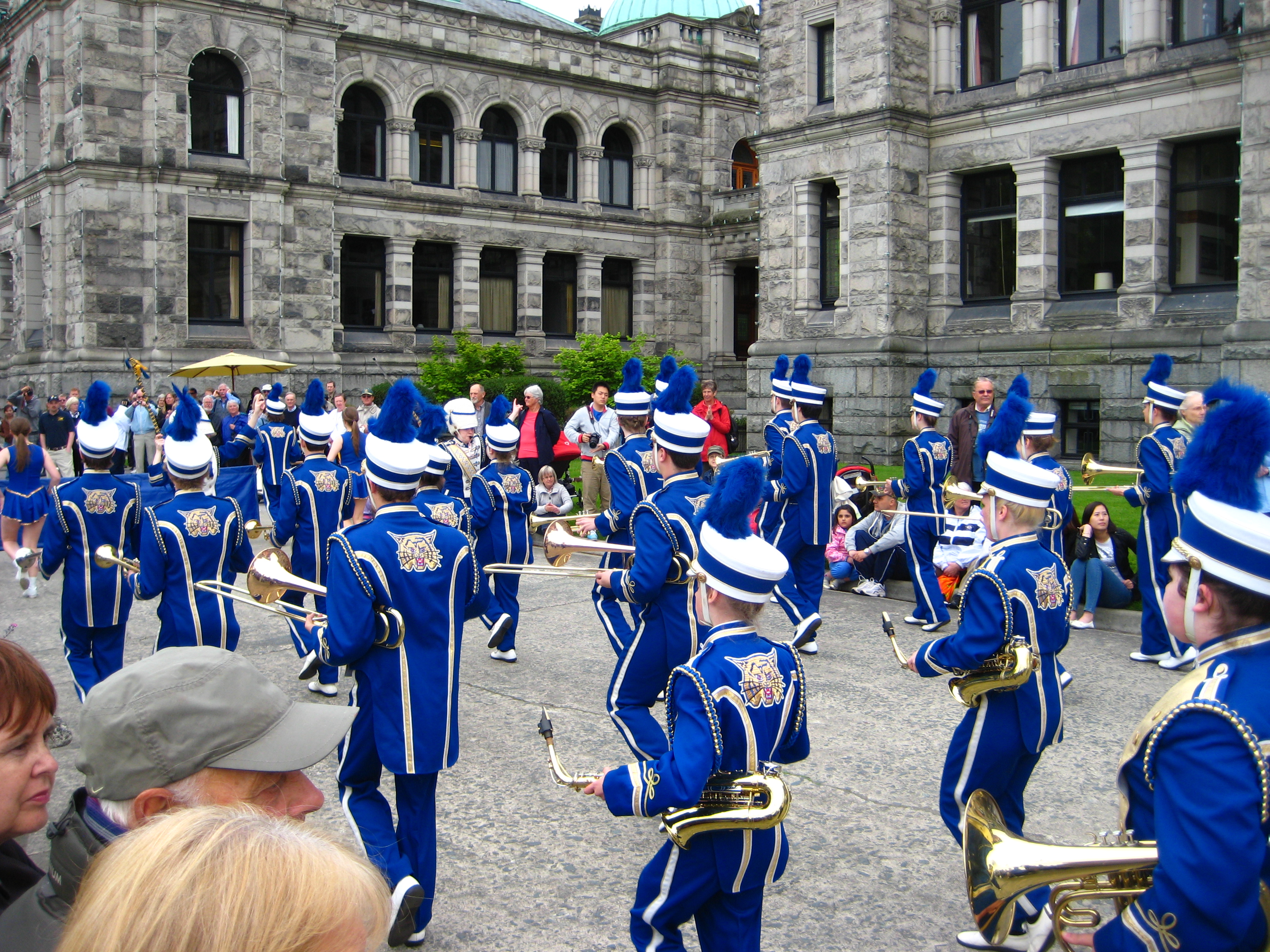
Aberdeen High School marching band at a Victoria Day parade in Victoria, British Columbia

- Harry F. Adams - Former track and field coach of the University of Montana for over 35 years
- Guy Bingham - Former NFL football player
- Mark Bruener - Former NFL football player
- Jeff Burlingame - NAACP Image Awards winner and multi award-winning author
- Kurt Cobain - Nirvana founder, guitarist, Lead vocalist and primary songwriter
- Dale Crover - Melvins drummer
- Bryan Danielson - Professional wrestler, 5-time WWE Champion
- Joel Dublanko - CFL linebacker for the Edmonton Elks
- Donald A. Duncan, swim coach for Puget Sound University from 1957-1994
- Chris Freeman - Pansy Division bass guitarist
- Mel Ingram - Former MLB player (Pittsburgh Pirates)
- J. Elroy McCaw - Businessman, Broadcaster
- Krist Novoselic - Nirvana bass guitarist, Sweet 75, Eyes Adrift
- Douglas D. Osheroff - Nobel Prize in Physics for the discovery of superfluidity in the isotope helium-3
- Lou Stewart - prominent labor leader
- Wesley Carl Uhlman - Mayor of Seattle, 1969–1978; youngest mayor of Seattle
- Hank Woon - Screenwriter, Author, Game Designer
