= Donald A. Duncan =

American swim coach

Donald Allen Duncan

Biographical details
- Born: November 16, 1929; Hoquiam, Washington, US
- Died: May 31, 2019 (aged 89); Tacoma, Washington, US
- Education: Washington State College

Coaching career (HC unless noted)
- 1950: Washington State College; Varsity Swim Team Manager
- 1956: Puget Sound Swim Instructor
- 1957-1994: Puget Sound University; Head Swim Coach

Head coaching record
- Overall: 307 W - 127 L Winning % .77 (Puget Sound)

Accomplishments and honors

Championships
- 15 Top Five Finishes (In National championships in NAIA, NCAA); 5 x Evergreen Conference Championships 1959-64

Awards
- '91 National Assoc. of Intercol. Athletics; Hall of Fame; Puget Sound Athletics Hall of Fame '88, '93 NAIA National Coach of the Year

Donald Allen Duncan was a Hall of Fame Swimming Coach who graduated Washington State University, and was best known for coaching the University of Puget Sound Swim team for thirty-seven years from 1957 to 1994, where he achieved a notable record in Dual Meets of 307 Wins and 127 losses and won five Evergreen Conference Championships from 1959 to 1964. With 307 dual meet swimming wins at Puget Sound, Duncan was credited in 2005 with winning more collegiate competitions than any other swimming coach in the Pacific Northwest. During his years as coach, Duncan led the Puget Sound swimming team to 15 top five finishes at National Championships in NCAA Division II and the National Association of Intercollegiate Athletics.

On November 16, 1929, Duncan was born in Hoquiam, Washington, to Henry Duncan and Zola (Hart Duncan), and grew up in nearby Aberdeen as one of four siblings including a sister Sally and brothers Jim and Robert.

== Education and military service ==
Duncan attended Aberdeen High School, in Aberdeen, Washington, graduating around 1946, where he swam for John "Bus" Fairbairn, who coached Aberdeen High swimming from 1944 to 1956. Fairbairn developed 16 state swimming champions at Aberdeen. While Duncan was attending Washington State, Fairbairn coached Aberdeen High swimming to two state championships in 1948 and 1949. Fairbairn served as president of the Washington Interscholastic Swimming Coaches Association (WISCA) in 1952.

Duncan majored in Education at Washington State University, then known as Washington State College, attending from around 1946-1950. In 1950, around his Senior year, he served as Manager of the Washington State Varsity swim team.

Beginning a military career after college graduation, he was a member of the United States Airforce from 1951 to 1956, where he served as a Communications Officer with the rank of first Lieutenant. He served for the Air Weather Service and worked in a variety of roles in military communications and systems.

== Puget Sound swim coach ==
Beginning as a swim instructor in 1956, from 1957 to 1994, Duncan worked as the Head Swim Coach of the Puget Sound University Loggers, a Division II NCAA competitor, and a member of the National Association of Intercollegiate Athletics. During his time as Head Coach, Puget Sound earned an overall record of 307 Wins and 127 Losses, achieving a winning percentage of .77 %.

Duncan's Pugent Sound University swimming teams had 15 top five finishes at National Championships in NCAA Division II and the former NAIA conference. In addition to coaching swimming, Duncan chaired the Education Department at Puget Sound for eleven years and was an associate professor. In 1964, Puget Sound's swim team won the Evergreen Conference Championship for the fifth consecutive year.

== Top swimmers coached at Puget Sound ==
1968 Olympian and Gold medalist Kaye Hall Greff

Most of Duncan's top swimmers who were the recipients of Puget Sound University Hall of Fame honors are listed in this section. Most notably, while at Puget Sound, Duncan coached 1968 Olympic Backstroke and Medley gold medalist Kaye Hall Greff, one of his most recognized women swimmers. He coached Ronda Blair Smith, who held 11 individual NAIA All-American honors in women's swimming and held the Puget Sound's Women's 200 IM record for 26 years. David Haynes, a Duncan swimmer from 1983-1987, was Puget Sound's 100 and 200 butterfly record holder, and a 1986-7 Ben Cheney Male Athlete of the Year.

Duncan also coached 1990 Puget Sound graduate and freestyler Bob Kabacy, and 1976 NCAA Division II 100- and 200-yard backstroke national champion Dan Seelye. He coached Washington State All American swimmer, and Tacoma area High School Swim Coach Byron Stauffer. Duncan also coached outstanding backstroke specialist and three-time national champion and All-American, Roger Woods. During his time coaching at the University of Puget Sound from 1958–59, Duncan coached Earl Ellis, a future 30-year coach for the University of Washington Huskies.

=== 100 Greatest Swimmers list ===
Several Puget Sound Athletic Hall of Fame swimmers coached by Duncan were voted to the 100 greatest swimmers list by the College Swimming Coaches Association of America. These include swimmers Sue Bendl Gregory, a six-time national champion and an All-American swimmer 29 times, Wendy Hunt Higley, Puget Sound's first women's national champion in swimming in the 50 and 100-yd freestyle in 1979, 1983-1985 NCAA Division II five-time national swimming champion Sarah Rudolph Cole, football and breaststroke swimming All-American Bob Jackson, and the exceptional Victor Swanson, who won five national swimming championships in five different individual events. Also included in the 100 greatest swimmers list was 1996 NAIA Outstanding Swimmer, and 1997 Ben Cheney Award recipient for Most Outstanding Male Athlete, Marc Kincaid. Melissa Loun, Sharie Juckelund, and Jill Rutledge swam for Duncan on the 1988-89 Women's swim team that won the NAIA National Championship that year, and each were voted to the CSCAA 100 greatest swimmers list.

Duncan remained heavily involved in the Puget Sound Alumni Association after his retirement from coaching. For forty years, he lived in a beach house on Puget Sound in Wauna, Washington, East of Tacoma, where he became an ardent boater. He had a particular interest in flying as a hobby.

Duncan died on May 31, 2019, in Tacoma, Washington, and services were held at St. Charles Boromeo, with Vigil services held June 13, at the Gafney Funeral Home Chapel. He was a Korean era veteran and was buried at the Tahoma National Cemetery with partial military honors.

== Honors ==
Duncan was named to the top 100 coaches of all time by the College Swimming & Diving Coaches Association of America. Most significantly, he was inducted into the National Association of Intercollegiate Athletics Hall of Fame in 1991. In 2005, he was inducted into the Pacific Northwest Swimming Hall of Fame, and in the same year was inducted into the Tacoma-Pierce County Sports Hall of Fame. He was fittingly inducted into the University of Puget Sound Athletic Hall of Fame in 1996 for his outstanding achievements as a Coach at the University, and for leading the team to 15 top five finishes at National Championships in NCAA Division II and the NAIA conference.
