= Robin Backhaus =

American swimmer (born 1955)

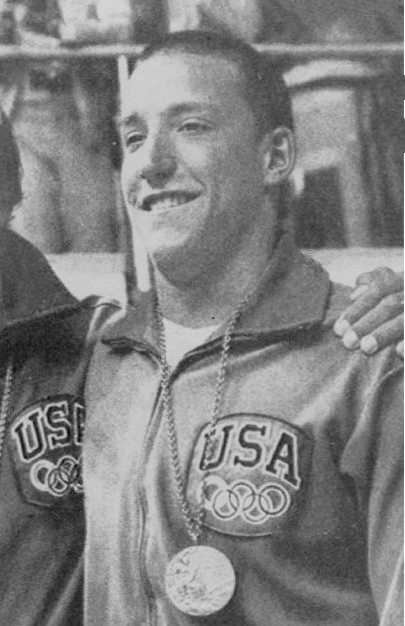
- Backhaus at the 1972 Olympics

Personal information
- Full name: Robin James Backhaus
- National team: United States
- Born: February 12, 1955 (age 71) Lincoln, Nebraska, U.S.
- Height: 6 ft 0 in (1.83 m)
- Weight: 170 lb (77 kg)

Sport
- Sport: Swimming
- Strokes: Butterfly
- Club: Riverside Aquatic Association
- College team: University of Washington; University of Alabama
- Coach: Earl Ellis (U. Washington); Don Gambril (Alabama)
Medal record
Representing the United States
Olympic Games
Bronze medal – third place	1972 Munich	200 m butterfly
World Championships (LC)
Gold medal – first place	1973 Belgrade	200 m butterfly
Gold medal – first place	1973 Belgrade	4×200 m freestyle
Bronze medal – third place	1973 Belgrade	100 m butterfly

Robin James Backhaus (born February 12, 1955) is an American former competition swimmer, Olympic medalist, and former world record-holder.

== High School swimming ==
He attended Cope Junior High School and later swam for both Redlands Senior High School and the Redlands Aquatics Association in Redlands, California. In 1973, in his Senior year in High School, he moved to Northern California from Redlands, near Los Angeles, and swam with and graduated from San Rafael High School near San Francisco while also swimming with the Marin Aquatic Club under Don Swartz.

Swimming for Redlands Swimming Association as a Junior Swimmer at the Pacific Southwest YMCA Swimming and Diving Championships in the summer of 1970, he set an age group record of 57.1 for the 100-yard butterfly, and a 23.2 in the 50-yard freestyle, fractions of a second off the former age group record. In a Marin County Athletic League Meet, swimming as a Senior for San Rafael High School in March 1973, he won the 100 free in 50.9 and the 200 Individual Medley in 2:08.4.

== Collegiate swimming ==
After High School, he swam for the University of Washington where he briefly swam for ASCAA Hall of Fame Coach Earl Ellis, who had a long coaching career with the Huskies. Backhaus transferred to the University of Alabama, where he completed his undergraduate studies and swam for the Crimson Tide Swim Team under Hall of Fame coach Don Gambril who would serve as a U.S. Swim team coach at the 1972 Summer Olympics attended by Backhaus.

In U.S. National competition, Backhaus won three AAU titles, in the 200 yd butterfly indoors in 1973–74, and in the 100 m butterfly in 1973. He also won NCAA titles in the 200 butterfly in 1974–75. He was an AAU All American in 1973 in both the 100-yard and 100-meter butterfly.

== 1972 Munich Olympics ==
Backhaus represented the United States as a 17-year-old at the 1972 Summer Olympics in Munich, Germany. In the first swimming final of the Olympic competition, Backhaus won a bronze medal for his third-place performance in the men's 200-meter butterfly, finishing with a time of 2:03.23 behind Mark Spitz and Gary Hall, and completing an American sweep of the event. Beginning his seven medal sweep, Spitz finished a full 1.6 seconds ahead of silver medalist Gary Hall, and Backhaus was about .6 seconds behind Hall in a close race.

== 1973 World Aquatics Championships ==
At the 1973 World Aquatics Championships in Belgrade, Yugoslavia, he won gold medals for his first-place finish in the 200-meter butterfly, and as a member of the winning U.S. team in the 4×200-meter freestyle relay. He also received a bronze medal for finishing third in the 100-meter butterfly.

After retiring from competition, Backhaus worked as a teacher and coach at Konawaena High School in Hawaii for four years, and then trained swimmers in Texas and California for over 20 years.

== See also ==
- List of Olympic medalists in swimming (men)
- List of University of Alabama people
- List of World Aquatics Championships medalists in swimming (men)
- World record progression 4 × 200 metres freestyle relay
