= 1970 Summer Universiade =

Multi-sport event in Turin, Italy

VI Summer Universiade VI Universiade estiva
- Host city: Turin, Italy
- Nations: 58
- Athletes: 2,084
- Events: 81 in 9 sports
- Opening: August 26, 1970
- Closing: September 6, 1970
- Opened by: Giuseppe Saragat
- Main venue: Stadio Comunale

The 1970 Summer Universiade, also known as the VI Summer Universiade, took place in Turin, Italy.

After the city of Lisbon failed to host the 1969 Summer Universiade, the games were assigned to Turin to be held next year.

== Sports at the 1970 Summer Universiade ==
- Athletics (33)
- Basketball (2)
- Diving (4)
- Fencing (8)
- Gymnastics (4)
- Swimming (22)
- Tennis (5)
- Volleyball (2)
- Water polo (1)

== Medal table ==
* Host nation (Italy)

Rank	Nation	Gold	Silver	Bronze	Total
1	Soviet Union (URS)	26	17	15	58
2	United States (USA)	22	18	11	51
3	East Germany (GDR)	8	3	4	15
4	Italy (ITA)*	4	4	7	15
5	Japan (JPN)	3	7	5	15
6	Hungary (HUN)	3	6	6	15
7	West Germany (FRG)	3	6	3	12
8	Great Britain (GBR)	3	4	7	14
9	Poland (POL)	3	1	5	9
10	Yugoslavia (YUG)	3	1	1	5
11	Netherlands (NED)	1	1	2	4
12	Austria (AUT)	1	1	1	3
12	Bulgaria (BUL)	1	1	1	3
14	France (FRA)	1	0	4	5
15	Romania (ROU)	0	4	2	6
16	Cuba (CUB)	0	2	3	5
17	Australia (AUS)	0	1	0	1
17	Czechoslovakia (TCH)	0	1	0	1
17	Greece (GRE)	0	1	0	1
17	Sweden (SWE)	0	1	0	1
21	Canada (CAN)	0	0	1	1
21	Madagascar (MAD)	0	0	1	1
21	Panama (PAN)	0	0	1	1
21	South Korea (KOR)	0	0	1	1
Totals (24 entries)		82	80	81	243
