= Swimming at the 1968 Summer Olympics – Women's 100 metre breaststroke =

Women's 100 metre breaststroke at the Games of the XIX Olympiad
- Venue: Alberca Olímpica Francisco Márquez
- Date: 18 September 1968 (heats & semifinals); 19 September 1968 (final)
- Competitors: 33 from 20 nations
- Winning time: 1:15.8 OR

Medalists
1st place, gold medalist(s)		Đurđica Bjedov	Yugoslavia
2nd place, silver medalist(s)		Galina Prozumenshchikova	Soviet Union
3rd place, bronze medalist(s)		Sharon Wichman	United States

The women's 100 metre breaststroke event at the 1968 Summer Olympics took place between 18 and 19 October in the Alberca Olímpica Francisco Márquez. This swimming event used the breaststroke. Because an Olympic size swimming pool is 50 metres long, this race consisted of two lengths of the pool. This was the first appearance for this event in the Olympics for the women swimmers.

American Katie Ball was the favorite to win three gold medals at the 1968 Olympics. She was the reigning world record holder in all four breaststroke distances and bettered her own world records in the 100-meter and 200-meter breaststroke at the U.S. Olympic Trials in August 1968. She arrived at the 1968 Summer Olympics in Mexico City, however, with a case of influenza. She won her only Olympic medal, a gold, as a member of the winning U.S. 4×100-meter medley relay team by swimming the breaststroke leg of the four-person relay. Sharing the gold medal honors were her relay teammates Kaye Hall (backstroke), Ellie Daniel (butterfly) and Susan Pedersen (freestyle). In the 100-meter breaststroke final, Ball led close to the finish but physical exhaustion overwhelmed her, and she finished fifth. She was too ill to swim in the subsequent preliminary heats of the 200-meter breaststroke and was scratched from the event.

== Results ==
=== Heats ===
Heat 1

Rank	Athlete	Country	Time	Notes
1	Catie Ball	United States	1:18.8	OR
2	Jo-Anne Barnes	Australia	1:19.1	
3	Sue Jones	United States	1:19.3	
4	Dorothy Harrison	Great Britain	1:19.6	
5	Christine Filippovits	Austria	1:19.9	
6	Tamara Oynick	Mexico	1:22.7	
7	Liana Vicens	Puerto Rico	1:25.2	

Heat 2

Rank	Athlete	Country	Time	Notes
1	Djurdjica Bjedov	Yugoslavia	1:17.7	OR
2	Alla Grebennikova	Soviet Union	1:19.3	
3	Shlomit Nir	Israel	1:20.9	
4	Ann O'Connor	Ireland	1:21.1	
5	Marjan Janus	Netherlands	1:21.9	
6	Tamara Orejuela	Ecuador	1:26.8	
7	Celia Jokisch	El Salvador	1:46.6	

Heat 3

Rank	Athlete	Country	Time	Notes
1	Sharon Wichman	United States	1:18.3	
2	Judy Playfair	Australia	1:19.2	
3	Yvonne Brage	Sweden	1:20.8	
4	Vreni Eberle	West Germany	1:22.6	
5	Víctoria Casas	Mexico	1:24.7	
6	María Moreño	El Salvador	1:27.2	

Heat 4

Rank	Athlete	Country	Time	Notes
1	Uta Frommater	West Germany	1:18.5	
2	Galina Prozumenschikova	Soviet Union	1:18.6	
3	Svetlana Babanina	Soviet Union	1:20.2	
4	Jill Slattery	Great Britain	1:20.7	
5	Sue McKenzie	Australia	1:20.9	
6	Ellen Ingvadóttir	Iceland	1:22.6	

Heat 5

Rank	Athlete	Country	Time	Notes
1	Ana María Norbis	Uruguay	1:17.4	OR
2	Kiyoe Nakagawa	Japan	1:18.2	
3	Diana Harris	Great Britain	1:19.8	
4	Yukari Takemoto	Japan	1:20.7	
5	Márta Egerváry	Hungary	1:22.6	
6	Arlette Wilmes	Luxembourg	1:24.4	
7	María Castro	El Salvador	1:36.9	

=== Semifinals ===
Heat 1

Rank	Athlete	Country	Time	Notes
1	Sharon Wichman	United States	1:16.8	OR
2	Djurdjica Bjedov	Yugoslavia	1:17.1	
3	Galina Prozumenschikova	Soviet Union	1:17.5	
4	Joanne Barnes	Australia	1:18.4	
5	Alla Grebennikova	Soviet Union	1:18.6	
6	Christine Filippovits	Austria	1:18.9	
7	Dorothy Harrison	Great Britain	1:19.6	
8	Jill Slattery	Great Britain	1:19.8	

Heat 2

Rank	Athlete	Country	Time	Notes
1	Ana Norbis	Uruguay	1:16.7	OR
2	Catie Ball	United States	1:16.8	
3	Uta Frommater	West Germany	1:16.9	
4	Kiyoe Nakagawa	Japan	1:17.7	
5	Svetlana Babanina	Soviet Union	1:18.3	
6	Sue Jones	United States	1:18.6	
7	Judy Playfair	Australia	1:19.3	
8	Diana Harris	Great Britain	1:19.3	

=== Final ===
Rank	Athlete	Country	Time	Notes
1	Đurđica Bjedov	Yugoslavia	1:15.8	OR
2	Galina Prozumenshchikova	Soviet Union	1:15.9	
3	Sharon Wichman	United States	1:16.1	
4	Uta Frommater	West Germany	1:16.2	
5	Catie Ball	United States	1:16.7	
6	Kiyoe Nakagawa	Japan	1:17.0	
7	Svetlana Babanina	Soviet Union	1:17.2	
8	Ana María Norbis	Uruguay	1:17.3	

Key: OR = Olympic record
