= Swimming at the 1968 Summer Olympics – Women's 200 metre breaststroke =

Women's 200 metre breaststroke at the Games of the XIX Olympiad
- Venue: Alberca Olímpica Francisco Márquez
- Date: 22 October (heats); 23 October (final)
- Competitors: 31 from 20 nations
- Winning time: 2:44.4 OR

Medalists
1st place, gold medalist(s)		Sharon Wichman	United States
2nd place, silver medalist(s)		Đurđica Bjedov	Yugoslavia
3rd place, bronze medalist(s)		Galina Prozumenshchikova	Soviet Union

The women's 200 metre breaststroke event, included in the swimming competition at the 1968 Summer Olympics, took place on October 22–23, at the Alberca Olímpica Francisco Márquez. In this event, swimmers covered four lengths of the 50-metre (160 ft) Olympic-sized pool employing the breaststroke. It was the tenth appearance of the event, which first appeared at the 1924 Summer Olympics in Paris. A total of 31 competitors from 20 nations participated in the event. American Catie Ball was the large favourite to win the event, as she had broken the world record in this event the last three times. However, she was suffering from a virus infection and was forced to withdraw from the heats. Her 16-year-old teammate Sharon Wichman won the event, breaking bronze medalist Galina Prozumenshchikova's Olympic record in the final.

== Records ==
Prior to this competition, the existing world and Olympic records were:

World record	Catie Ball (USA)	2:38.5 s	Los Angeles, United States	26 August 1968
Olympic record	Galina Prozumenshchikova (URS)	2:46.4 s	Tokyo, Japan	12 October 1964

The following records were established during the competition:

Date	Round	Name	Nationality	Time	OR	WR
23 October	Final	Sharon Wichman	United States	2:44.4	OR	

== Results ==
=== Heats ===
Rank	Heat	Lane	Name	Nationality	Time	Notes
1	2	1	Sharon Wichman	United States	2:46.8	Q
2	4	6	Galina Prozumenshchikova	Soviet Union	2:47.8	Q
3	5	2	Ana María Norbis	Uruguay	2:49.4	Q
4	3	1	Svetlana Babanina	Soviet Union	2:49.8	Q
4	5	4	Alla Grebennikova	Soviet Union	2:49.8	Q
6	3	3	Cathy Jamison	United States	2:50.1	Q
7	3	4	Đurđica Bjedov	Yugoslavia	2:50.2	Q
8	4	3	Chieno Shibata	Japan	2:50.6	Q
9	2	6	Jill Slattery	Great Britain	2:51.2	
10	1	3	Christl Filippovits	Austria	2:51.3	
11	2	4	Tamara Oynick	Mexico	2:52.4	
12	2	3	Vreni Eberle	West Germany	2:52.5	
13	1	2	Judy Playfair	Australia	2:52.9	
14	4	2	Sue McKenzie	Australia	2:53.1	
15	1	4	Dorothy Harrison	Great Britain	2:55.1	
16	5	3	Yoshimi Nishigawa	Japan	2:55.3	
17	3	2	Yvonne Brage	Sweden	2:56.3	
18	5	7	Ann O'Connor	Ireland	2:56.4	
19	4	1	Jo-Anne Barnes	Australia	2:57.4	
20	5	6	Klenie Bimolt	Netherlands	2:57.9	
21	4	4	Yukari Takemoto	Japan	2:57.9	
22	4	5	Ellen Ingvadóttir	Iceland	2:58.2	
23	3	6	Shlomit Nir	Israel	2:58.5	
24	2	2	Víctoria Casas	Mexico	3:01.0	
25	2	5	Diana Harris	Great Britain	3:03.4	
26	3	6	Ana Elena de la Portilla	Mexico	3:03.5	
27	5	5	Arlette Wilmes	Luxembourg	3:06.7	
28	1	5	Hedy García	Philippines	3:08.1	
29	1	1	Tamara Orejuela	Ecuador	3:08.5	
30	4	7	María Moreño	El Salvador	3:15.4	
31	5	1	Liana Vicens	Puerto Rico	3:16.2	

=== Final ===
Rank	Name	Nationality	Time	Notes
1st place, gold medalist(s)	Sharon Wichman	United States	2:44.4	OR
2nd place, silver medalist(s)	Đurđica Bjedov	Yugoslavia	2:46.4	
3rd place, bronze medalist(s)	Galina Prozumenshchikova	Soviet Union	2:47.0	
4	Alla Grebennikova	Soviet Union	2:47.1	
5	Cathy Jamison	United States	2:48.4	
6	Svetlana Babanina	Soviet Union	2:48.4	
7	Chieno Shibata	Japan	2:51.5	
8	Ana María Norbis	Uruguay	2:51.9	

== Sources ==
- "The Games of the XIX Olympiad Mexico 1968: The Official Report of the Organising Committee" (PDF). Volume Three, Part 1. Organizing Committee of the Games of the XIX Olympiad, Mexico 68. 1968.
- Albert Schoenfeld, ed. (November 1968). "Results from the 1968 Olympic Games (Mexico City)" (PDF). Swimming World & Junior Swimmer. Volume 9, Issue 11. Albert Schoenfeld. ISSN 0039-7431.
- "Swimming at the 1968 Ciudad de México Summer Games: Women's 200 metres Breaststroke Final". Olympics at Sports-Reference.com. Sports Reference, LLC. Archived from the original on 17 April 2020.
