= Celia Jokisch =

Salvadoran swimmer (born 1954)

Personal information
- Full name: Celia Jokisch Argüello
- Born: 13 September 1954 (age 71) San Salvador, El Salvador

Sport
- Sport: Swimming

Celia Jokisch Argüello (born 13 September 1954) is a Salvadoran former swimmer. For the 1968 Summer Olympics, she competed for El Salvador in the women's 100 metre breaststroke. After her swimming career, she competed in master's triathlon.

== Biography ==
Celia Jokisch Argüello was born on 13 September 1954 in San Salvador, El Salvador. Her brother is fellow swimmer, Friedrich Jokisch, who competed at the 1968 Summer Olympics. As a swimmer, she competed for El Salvador in international competition.

Jokisch was selected to compete for El Salvador at the 1968 Summer Olympics in Mexico City, Mexico, for the nation's first appearance at an Olympic Games at a sporting capacity. For the 1968 Summer Games, she was entered in the women's 100 metre breaststroke, to be held at the Alberca Olímpica Francisco Márquez. At the time, she had a height of 154 centimetres (5.05 ft) and a weight of 52 kilograms (115 lb). For the event, she competed in the qualifying heats held on 18 September. She competed in the second heat and competed against six other athletes, namely: eventual Olympic champion Đurđica Bjedov, Alla Grebennikova, Marjan Janus, Shlomit Nir, Ann O'Connor, and Tamara Orejuela. There, Jokisch recorded a time of 1:46.6 and placed last in the heat, failing to advance further as only the top three of each heat could qualify further to the semifinals. Her time was the slowest amongst all of the competitors in the event, with the second-slowest being a 1:36.9 set by her teammate María Castro.

After her swimming career, she competed at the 1995 International Triathlon Union Age-Group World Championships held in Cancún, Mexico. There, she competed in the 40–44 age category and placed 34th with a time of 2:49:00.
