= María Castro (swimmer) =

Salvadoran swimmer (born 1953)

Personal information
- Full name: María Elena Castro
- Born: 13 November 1953 (age 72) San Salvador, El Salvador

Sport
- Sport: Swimming

María Elena Castro (born 13 November 1953) is a Salvadoran former swimmer. She was selected to compete for El Salvador at the 1968 Summer Olympics. There, she competed in the women's 100 metre breaststroke but did not advance further past the qualifiers. She was also entered in the women's 200 metre breaststroke.

== Biography ==
María Elena Castro was born on 13 November 1953 in San Salvador, El Salvador. As a swimmer, she competed for El Salvador in international competition.

Castro was selected to compete for El Salvador at the 1968 Summer Olympics in Mexico City, Mexico, for the nation's first appearance at an Olympic Games at a sporting capacity. For the 1968 Summer Games, she was entered in two events, the women's 100 metre breaststroke and women's 200 metre breaststroke, to be held at the Alberca Olímpica Francisco Márquez. At the time of the 1968 Summer Games, she had a height of 161 centimetres (5.28 ft) and a weight of 50 kilograms (110 lb). For the women's 100 metre breaststroke, she competed in the qualifying heats held on 18 September. She competed in the fifth heat, the last heat of the qualifying heats, and competed against six other swimmers, namely: Márta Egerváry, Diana Harris, Kiyoe Nakagawa, Ana María Norbis, Yukari Takemoto, and Arlette Wilmes. There, she recorded a time of 1:36.9 and placed last in her heat, failing to advance further as only the top three of each heat could qualify further to the semifinals. Although she was entered in the women's 200 metre breaststroke, she did not start in the event. Had she competed, she would have competed in the second qualifying heat against six other swimmers.
