= Swimming at the 1967 Pan American Games – Women's 200 metre breaststroke =

Women's 200 metre breaststroke at the 1967 Pan American Games
- Venue: Pan Am Pool
- Dates: July 26 (preliminaries and finals)
- Competitors: from - nations

Medalists
| Gold medal | Catie Ball | United States |
| Silver medal | Claudia Kolb | United States |
| Bronze medal | Ana María Norbis | Uruguay |

The women's 200 metre breaststroke competition of the swimming events at the 1967 Pan American Games took place on 26 July at the Pan Am Pool. The last Pan American Games champion was Alice Driscoll of US.

This race consisted of four lengths of the pool, all in breaststroke.

== Results ==
All times are in minutes and seconds.

| KEY: | q | Fastest non-qualifiers | Q | Qualified | GR | Games record | NR | National record | PB | Personal best | SB | Seasonal best |

=== Final ===
The final was held on July 26.

| Rank | Name | Nationality | Time | Notes |
|---|---|---|---|---|
| 1st place, gold medalist(s) | Catie Ball | United States | 2:42.1 | GR |
| 2nd place, silver medalist(s) | Claudia Kolb | United States | 2:48.9 | |
| 3rd place, bronze medalist(s) | Ana María Norbis | Uruguay | 2:52.1 | |
| 4 | Tamara Oynick | Mexico | 2:58.5 | |
| 5 | Mary Pumfrey | Canada | 2:58.8 | |
| 6 | Tamara Orejuela | Ecuador | 2:59.7 | |
| 7 | Donna Ross | Canada | 2:59.7 | |
| 8 | Victoria Casas | Mexico | 3:07.8 | |
