= Swimming at the 1971 Pan American Games – Women's 200 metre breaststroke =

Women's 200 metre breaststroke at the 1971 Pan American Games
- Venue: -
- Dates: August 9 (preliminaries and finals)
- Competitors: from - nations

Medalists
Gold medal	Lynn Colella	United States
Silver medal	Jane Wright	Canada
Bronze medal	Leonor Urrueta	Mexico

The women's 200 metre breaststroke competition of the swimming events at the 1971 Pan American Games took place on 9 August. The last Pan American Games champion was Catie Ball of US.

This race consisted of four lengths of the pool, all in breaststroke.

== Results ==
All times are in minutes and seconds.

KEY:	q	Fastest non-qualifiers	Q	Qualified	GR	Games record	NR	National record	PB	Personal best	SB	Seasonal best

=== Final ===
The final was held on August 9.

Rank	Name	Nationality	Time	Notes
1st place, gold medalist(s)	Lynn Colella	United States	2:50.0	
2nd place, silver medalist(s)	Jane Wright	Canada	2:50.9	NR
3rd place, bronze medalist(s)	Leonor Urrueta	Mexico	2:52.7	
4	Kimla Brecht	United States	2:55.4	
5	Rose Marie Pepe	Canada	2:55.9	
6	Angela Lopez	Puerto Rico	2:58.3	
7	Cristina Teixeira	Brazil	3:00.4	
8	Eliane Pereira	Brazil	3:07.2	
