= Sue Jones =

Sue or Susan Jones may refer to:

- Susan L. Mann (born 1943), sometimes credited as Susan Mann Jones, American historian and sinologist
- Susan Jones (swimmer) (born 1954), British Olympic swimmer
- Sue Jones (actress) (born 1947), Welsh-born Australian actress
- Susan Henshaw Jones (active 1975–2015), American museum director
- Sue Jones (Ravi Shankar), had relationship with Ravi Shankar, father of Norah Jones
- Sue Jones (priest) (born 1960), Anglican priest
- Sue Jones (computational biologist) (active since 1990), British computational biologist
- Susan Elan Jones (born 1968), British politician
- Sue Maroroa Jones (1991–2023), New Zealand-English chess player
- Suzy Jones (born 1948), American swimmer

== See also ==
- Sue Jones-Davies (born 1949), Welsh actress and singer
- Susie Jones (disambiguation)
- Susannah Jones (disambiguation)
