= Jokisch =

Jokisch is a surname. Notable people with the surname include:

- Celia Jokisch (born 1954), Salvadoran swimmer
- Eric Jokisch (born 1989), American baseball player
- Friedrich Jokisch (1952–?), Salvadoran swimmer
- Rodrigo Jokisch (born 1946), German sociologist
- Walter Jokisch (1914–1984), German actor
