= Sharon Jones (disambiguation) =

Sharon Jones (1956–2016) was an American soul/funk singer.

Sharon Jones may also refer to:

- Sharon Jones (figure skater) (born 1964), British ice dancer
- Sharon Wichman (1952) (also known as Sharon Jones), American swimmer
