= Susie Jones =

Susie Jones may refer to:

- Susie Jones, sister of Indiana Jones
- Susie Jones, presenter on WCCO (AM)
- Susie Jones (filmmaker), see AACTA Award for Best Documentary Under One Hour

== See also ==
- Suzy Jones (born 1948), American swimmer
- Susannah Jones (disambiguation)
- Sue Jones (disambiguation)
