= 100 metres breaststroke =

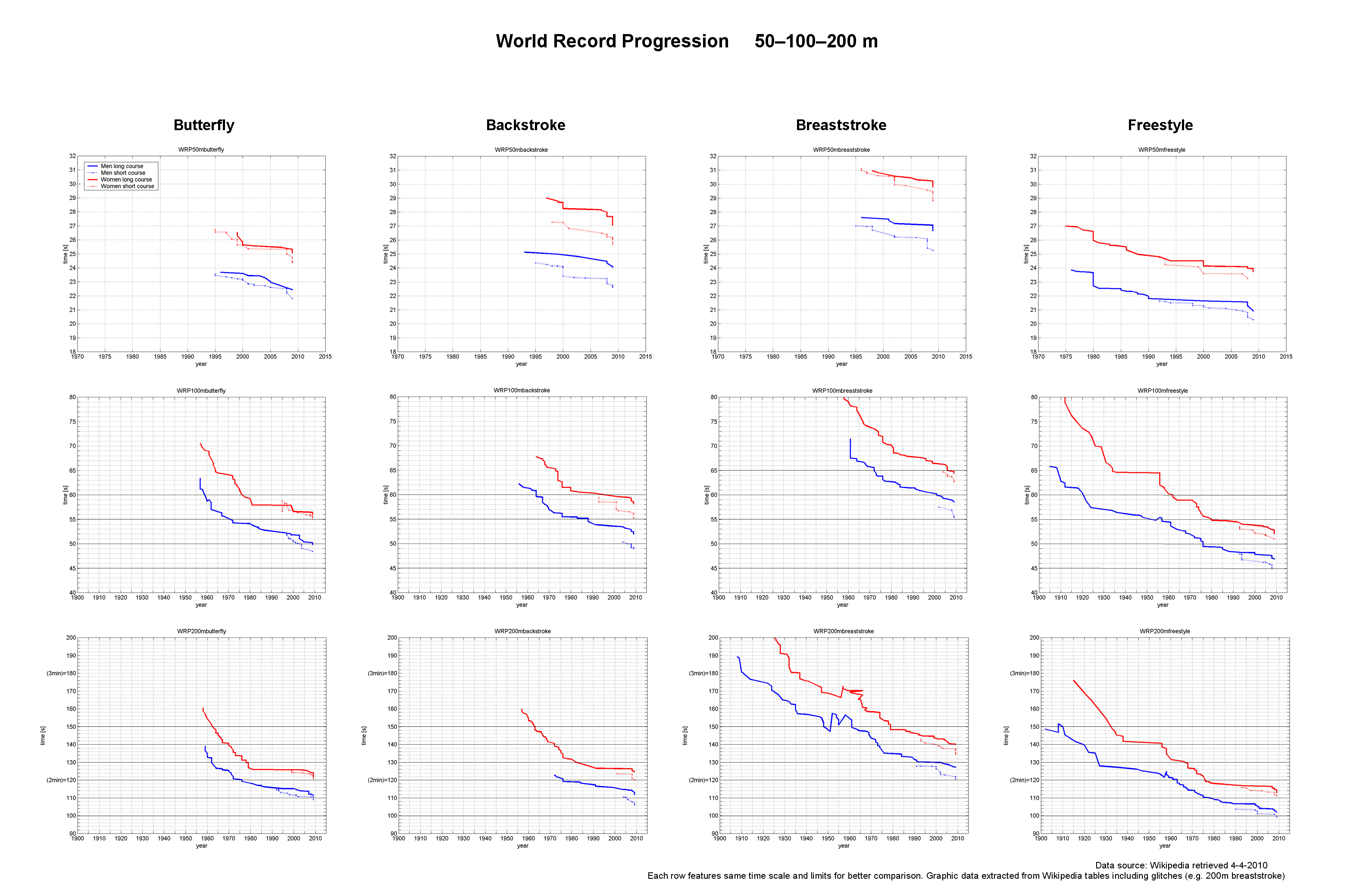
Graphic data for World Record Progression in Men and Women Swimming 50m-100m-200m Long and Short Course Butterfly-Backstroke-Breaststroke-Freestyle

The 100 metres breaststroke is an event in competitive swimming. World records are ratified by World Aquatics (formerly FINA). The current long course world record holders are Great Britain's Adam Peaty and the US' Lilly King, while the current short course world record holders are Belarus' Ilya Shymanovich, Lithuania's Rūta Meilutytė and Jamaica's Alia Atkinson.

The men's and women's events were first contested at the Olympic Games in 1968; the current Olympic champions are Italy's Nicolò Martinenghi and South Africa's Tatjana Smith. The men's and women's events have been contested at the World Aquatics Championships since the inaugural championships in 1973; the current world champions (long course) are China's Qin Haiyang and Germany's Anna Elendt. The men's and women's events have been contested at the World Aquatics Swimming Championships (25m) since the inaugural championships in 1993; the current world champions (short course) are Qin, and China's Tang Qianting.

== World record progression ==
=== Men long course ===
#	Time		Name	Nationality	Date	Meet	Location	Ref
1	1:14.1		Leonid Kolesnikov	Soviet Union	2 May 1961	-	Moscow, Soviet Union	
2	1:11.1		Chet Jastremski	United States	2 July 1961	-	Chicago, United States	
3	1:10.7		Gunter Tittes	East Germany	5 July 1961	-	East Berlin, East Germany	
3	1:10.7	e	Chet Jastremski	United States	28 July 1961	-	Tokyo, Japan	
5	1:10.0		Chet Jastremski	United States	30 July 1961	-	Tokyo, Japan	
6	1:09.5		Chet Jastremski	United States	3 August 1961	-	Osaka, Japan	
7	1:07.8		Chet Jastremski	United States	20 August 1961	Men’s NAAA Championships	Los Angeles, United States	
8	1:07.5		Chet Jastremski	United States	20 August 1961	Men’s NAAA Championships	Los Angeles, United States	
9	1:07.4		Georgy Prokopenko	Soviet Union	26 March 1964	-	Baku, Soviet Union	
10	1:06.9		Georgy Prokopenko	Soviet Union	3 September 1964	-	Moscow, Soviet Union	
11	1:06.7		Vladimir Kosinsky	Soviet Union	8 November 1967	-	Leningrad, Soviet Union	
12	1:06.4		Jose Fiolo	Brazil	19 February 1968	-	Rio de Janeiro, Brazil	
13	1:06.2		Nikolai Pankin	Soviet Union	18 April 1968	-	Moscow, Soviet Union	
14	1:05.8		Nikolai Pankin	Soviet Union	20 April 1969	-	Magdeburg, East Germany	
15	1:05.68	sf	John Hencken	United States	29 August 1972	Olympic Games	Munich, West Germany	
16	1:05.13	sf	Nobutaka Taguchi	Japan	29 August 1972	Olympic Games	Munich, West Germany	
17	1:04.94		Nobutaka Taguchi	Japan	30 August 1972	Olympic Games	Munich, West Germany	
18	1:04.35	h	John Hencken	United States	4 September 1973	World Championships	Belgrade, Yugoslavia	
19	1:04.02		John Hencken	United States	4 September 1973	World Championships	Belgrade, Yugoslavia	
20	1:03.88		John Hencken	United States	31 August 1974	USA vs GDR Dual Meet	Concord, United States	
20	1:03.88	e, h	John Hencken	United States	19 July 1976	Olympic Games	Montreal, Canada	
22	1:03.62	sf	John Hencken	United States	19 July 1976	Olympic Games	Montreal, Canada	
23	1:03.11		John Hencken	United States	20 July 1976	Olympic Games	Montreal, Canada	
24	1:02.86		Gerald Mörken	West Germany	18 August 1977	-	Jönköping, Sweden	
25	1:02.62		Steve Lundquist	United States	19 July 1982	USA World Championship Trials	Mission Viejo, United States	
26	1:02.53		Steve Lundquist	United States	21 August 1982	-	Indianapolis, United States	
27	1:02.34		Steve Lundquist	United States	19 July 1983	US National Championships	Clovis, United States	
28	1:02.28		Steve Lundquist	United States	17 August 1983	Pan American Games	Caracas, Venezuela	
29	1:02.13		John Moffet	United States	25 June 1984	US Olympic Trials	Indianapolis, United States	
30	1:01.65		Steve Lundquist	United States	29 July 1984	Olympic Games	Los Angeles, United States	
31	1:01.49	h	Adrian Moorhouse	Great Britain	15 August 1989	European Championships	Bonn, West Germany	
31	1:01.49	e	Adrian Moorhouse	Great Britain	25 January 1990	Commonwealth Games	Auckland, New Zealand	
31	1:01.49	e	Adrian Moorhouse	Great Britain	26 July 1990	-	London, United Kingdom	
31	1:01.49	e, h	Norbert Rózsa	Hungary	7 January 1991	World Championships	Perth, Australia	
35	1:01.45		Norbert Rózsa	Hungary	7 January 1991	World Championships	Perth, Australia	
35	1:01.45	e	Vasili Ivanov	Soviet Union	11 June 1991	-	Moscow, Soviet Union	
37	1:01.29	h	Norbert Rózsa	Hungary	20 August 1991	European Championships	Athens, Greece	
38	1:00.95	h	Károly Güttler	Hungary	3 August 1993	European Championships	Sheffield, Great Britain	
39	1:00.60	h	Frederik Deburghgraeve	Belgium	20 July 1996	Olympic Games	Atlanta, United States	
40	1:00.36	sf	Roman Sludnov	Russia	15 June 2000	-	Moscow, Russia	
41	1:00.29		Ed Moses	United States	28 March 2001	US National Championships	Austin, United States	
42	1:00.26	sf	Roman Sludnov	Russia	28 June 2001	Russian Championships	Moscow, Russia	
43	59.97		Roman Sludnov	Russia	29 June 2001	Russian Championships	Moscow, Russia	
44	59.94	sf	Roman Sludnov	Russia	23 July 2001	World Championships	Fukuoka, Japan	
45	59.78		Kosuke Kitajima	Japan	21 July 2003	World Championships	Barcelona, Spain	
46	59.30		Brendan Hansen	United States	8 July 2004	US Olympic Trials	Long Beach, United States	
47	59.13		Brendan Hansen	United States	1 August 2006	US National Championships	Irvine, United States	
48	58.91		Kosuke Kitajima	Japan	11 August 2008	Olympic Games	Beijing, China	
-	58.67		Ihor Borysyk	Ukraine	13 June 2009	Ukrainian National Cup	Kharkiv, Ukraine	
49	58.58		Brenton Rickard	Australia	27 July 2009	World Championships	Rome, Italy	
50	58.46		Cameron van der Burgh	South Africa	29 July 2012	Olympic Games	London, United Kingdom	
51	57.92		Adam Peaty	Great Britain	17 April 2015	British Championships	London, United Kingdom	
52	57.55	h	Adam Peaty	Great Britain	6 August 2016	Olympic Games	Rio de Janeiro, Brazil	
53	57.13		Adam Peaty	Great Britain	7 August 2016	Olympic Games	Rio de Janeiro, Brazil	
54	57.10		Adam Peaty	Great Britain	4 August 2018	European Championships	Glasgow, United Kingdom	
55	56.88	sf	Adam Peaty	Great Britain	21 July 2019	World Championships	Gwangju, South Korea	

Legend: # – Record awaiting ratification by World Aquatics; e – equalled existing record;
Records not set in finals: h – heat; sf – semifinal; r – relay 1st leg; rh – relay heat 1st leg; b – B final; † – en route to final mark; so – swim-off; tt – time trial

=== Men short course ===
#	Time		Name	Nationality	Date	Meet	Location	Ref
1	59.30		Dmitry Volkov	Soviet Union	10 February 1990	World Cup	Bonn, West Germany	
2	59.07		Phil Rogers	Australia	27 August 1993	-	Melbourne, Australia	
3	59.02		Frédérik Deburghgraeve	Belgium	17 February 1996	-	Bastogne, Belgium	
4	58.79		Frédérik Deburghgraeve	Belgium	4 December 1998	-	College Station, United States	
5	58.51	sf	Roman Sludnov	Russia	17 March 2000	World Championships	Athens, Greece	
6	58.05	h	Ed Moses	United States	24 March 2000	NCAA Men's Division I Championships	Minneapolis, United States	
7	57.66		Ed Moses	United States	24 March 2000	NCAA Men's Division I Championships	Minneapolis, United States	
8	57.47		Ed Moses	United States	23 January 2003	World Cup	Sweden, Sweden	
9	56.88		Cameron van der Burgh	South Africa	9 November 2008	World Cup	Moscow, Russia	
10	56.39	sf	Cameron van der Burgh	South Africa	8 August 2009	South African Championships	Pietermaritzburg, South Africa	
11	55.99		Cameron van der Burgh	South Africa	9 August 2009	South African Championships	Pietermaritzburg, South Africa	
12	55.61		Cameron van der Burgh	South Africa	15 November 2009	World Cup	Berlin, Germany	
13	55.49		Adam Peaty	Great Britain	15 November 2020	International Swimming League	Budapest, Hungary	
14	55.41		Adam Peaty	Great Britain	22 November 2020	International Swimming League	Budapest, Hungary	
15	55.34		Ilya Shymanovich	Belarus	19 December 2020	Belarusian Championships	Brest, Belarus	
16	55.32		Ilya Shymanovich	Belarus	19 November 2021	International Swimming League	Eindhoven, Netherlands	
17	55.28		Ilya Shymanovich	Belarus	26 November 2021	International Swimming League	Eindhoven, Netherlands	
18	55.14	#	Van Mathias	United States	29 October 2026	US Short Course World Championship Trials	Westmont, United States	

Legend: # – Record awaiting ratification by World Aquatics; e – equalled existing record;
Records not set in finals: h – heat; sf – semifinal; r – relay 1st leg; rh – relay heat 1st leg; b – B final; † – en route to final mark; so – swim-off; tt – time trial

=== Women long course ===
#	Time		Name	Nationality	Date	Meet	Location	Ref
1	1:20.3		Karin Beyer	East Germany	20 July 1958	-	East Berlin, East Germany	
2	1:19.6		Karin Beyer	East Germany	12 September 1958	-	Leipzig, East Germany	
3	1:19.1		Wiltrud Urselmann	West Germany	12 March 1960	-	Zürich, Switzerland	
4	1:19.0		Ursula Küper	East Germany	14 July 1960	-	Leipzig, East Germany	
5	1:18.2		Barbara Göbel	East Germany	1 July 1961	-	Rostock, East Germany	
6	1:17.9		Claudia Kolb	United States	11 July 1964	-	Los Angeles, United States	
7	1:17.2		Svetlana Babanina	Soviet Union	3 September 1964	-	Moscow, Soviet Union	
8	1:16.5		Svetlana Babanina	Soviet Union	11 May 1965	-	Tashkent, Soviet Union	
9	1:16.4		Catie Ball	United States	15 July 1966	-	Winter Park, United States	
10	1:15.7		Galina Prozumenshchikova	Soviet Union	17 July 1966	-	Leningrad, Soviet Union	
11	1:15.6		Catie Ball	United States	28 December 1966	-	Fort Lauderdale, United States	
12	1:14.8		Catie Ball	United States	31 July 1967	Pan American Games	Winnipeg, Canada	
13	1:14.6		Catie Ball	United States	19 August 1967	AAU National Championships	Philadelphia, United States	
14	1:14.2		Catie Ball	United States	25 August 1968	US Olympic Trials	Los Angeles, United States	
15	1:13.58		Cathy Carr	United States	2 September 1972	Olympic Games	Munich, West Germany	
16	1:12.91	h	Renate Vogel	East Germany	22 August 1974	European Championships	Vienna, Austria	
17	1:12.55		Christel Justen	West Germany	23 August 1974	European Championships	Vienna, Austria	
18	1:12.28		Renate Vogel	East Germany	1 September 1974	USA vs. GDR Dual Meet	Concord, United States	
19	1:11.93		Carola Nitschke	East Germany	2 June 1976	GDR National Championships	East Berlin, East Germany	
20	1:11.11	h	Hannelore Anke	East Germany	22 July 1976	Olympic Games	Montreal, Canada	
21	1:10.86	sf	Hannelore Anke	East Germany	22 July 1976	Olympic Games	Montreal, Canada	
22	1:10.31		Yuliya Bogdanova	Soviet Union	22 August 1978	World Championships	West Berlin, West Germany	
23	1:10.20		Ute Geweniger	East Germany	26 May 1980	-	Magdeburg, East Germany	
24	1:10.11	h	Ute Geweniger	East Germany	24 July 1980	Olympic Games	Moscow, Soviet Union	
25	1:09.52		Ute Geweniger	East Germany	9 April 1981	-	Gera, East Germany	
26	1:09.39		Ute Geweniger	East Germany	2 July 1981	-	East Berlin, East Germany	
27	1:08.60		Ute Geweniger	East Germany	9 April 1981	European Championships	Split, Yugoslavia	
28	1:08.51		Ute Geweniger	East Germany	25 August 1983	European Championships	Rome, Italy	
28	1:08.29		Sylvia Gerasch	East Germany	23 August 1984	Friendship Games	Moscow, Soviet Union	
29	1:08.11		Sylvia Gerasch	East Germany	11 August 1986	World Championships	Madrid, Spain	
30	1:07.91		Silke Hörner	East Germany	21 August 1987	European Championships	Strasbourg, France	
31	1:07.69		Samantha Riley	Australia	9 September 1994	World Championships	Rome, Italy	
32	1:07.46		Penelope Heyns	South Africa	2 July 1996	South African National Championships	Durban, South Africa	
33	1:07.02	h	Penelope Heyns	South Africa	21 July 1996	Olympic Games	Atlanta, United States	
34	1:06.99	h	Penelope Heyns	South Africa	18 July 1999	Janet Evans Invitational	Los Angeles, United States	
35	1:06.95		Penelope Heyns	South Africa	18 July 1999	Janet Evans Invitational	Los Angeles, United States	
36	1:06.52	h	Penelope Heyns	South Africa	23 August 1999	Pan Pacific Championships	Sydney, Australia	
37	1:06.37	sf	Leisel Jones	Australia	21 July 2003	World Championships	Barcelona, Spain	
38	1:06.20	sf	Jessica Hardy	United States	25 July 2005	World Championships	Montreal, Canada	
39	1:05.71		Leisel Jones	Australia	3 February 2006	Australian Championships	Melbourne, Australia	
40	1:05.09		Leisel Jones	Australia	20 March 2006	Commonwealth Games	Melbourne, Australia	
41	1:04.84	sf	Rebecca Soni	United States	27 July 2009	World Championships	Rome, Italy	
42	1:04.45		Jessica Hardy	United States	7 August 2009	US Open	Federal Way, United States	
43	1:04.35	sf	Rūta Meilutytė	Lithuania	29 July 2013	World Championships	Barcelona, Spain	
44	1:04.13		Lilly King	United States	25 July 2017	World Championships	Budapest, Hungary	

Legend: # – Record awaiting ratification by World Aquatics; e – equalled existing record;
Records not set in finals: h – heat; sf – semifinal; r – relay 1st leg; rh – relay heat 1st leg; b – B final; † – en route to final mark; so – swim-off; tt – time trial

=== Women short course ===
#	Time		Name	Nationality	Date	Meet	Location	Ref
1	1:06.58		Dai Guohong	China	4 December 1993	World Championships	Palma de Mallorca, Spain	
2	1:05.70		Samantha Riley	Australia	1 December 1995	World Championships	Rio de Janeiro, Brazil	
3	1:05.57		Penelope Heyns	South Africa	5 September 1999	-	Johannesburg, South Africa	
4	1:05.40		Penelope Heyns	South Africa	26 September 1999	South African Championships	Durban, South Africa	
5	1:05.29		Emma Igelström	Sweden	15 March 2003	-	Stockholm, Sweden	
6	1:05.11		Emma Igelström	Sweden	16 March 2003	-	Stockholm, Sweden	
7	1:05.09		Leisel Jones	Australia	28 November 2003	World Cup	Melbourne, Australia	
8	1:04.79		Tara Kirk	United States	18 March 2004	NCAA Women's Division I Championships	Austin, United States	
9	1:04.12	sf	Leisel Jones	Australia	27 August 2006	Australian Championships	Hobart, Australia	
10	1:03.86		Leisel Jones	Australia	28 August 2006	Australian Championships	Hobart, Australia	
11	1:03.72		Leisel Jones	Australia	26 April 2008	Swimming Australia Grand Prix	Canberra, Australia	
12	1:03.00		Leisel Jones	Australia	14 November 2009	World Cup	Berlin, Germany	
13	1:02.70		Rebecca Soni	United States	19 December 2009	Duel in the Pool	Manchester, United Kingdom	
14	1:02.36		Rūta Meilutytė	Lithuania	12 October 2013	World Cup	Moscow, Russia	
14	1:02.36	e	Alia Atkinson	Jamaica	3 December 2014	World Championships	Doha, Qatar	
14	1:02.36	e	Alia Atkinson	Jamaica	26 August 2016	World Cup	Chartres, France	

Legend: # – Record awaiting ratification by World Aquatics; e – equalled existing record;
Records not set in finals: h – heat; sf – semifinal; r – relay 1st leg; rh – relay heat 1st leg; b – B final; † – en route to final mark; so – swim-off; tt – time trial

== All-time top 25 ==
Tables show data for two definitions of "Top 25" - the top 25 100 m breaststroke times and the top 25 athletes:
- denotes top performance for athletes in the top 25 100 m breaststroke times
- denotes lesser performances, still in the top 25 100 m breaststroke times, by repeat athletes
- denotes top performance (only) for other top 25 athletes who fall outside the top 25 100 m breaststroke times

=== Men long course ===
- Correct as of August 2026

Ath.#	Perf.#	Time	Athlete	Nation	Date	Place	Ref.
1	1	56.88	Adam Peaty	Great Britain	21 July 2019	Gwangju	
	2	57.10	Peaty #2		4 August 2018	Glasgow	
	3	57.13	Peaty #3		7 August 2016	Rio de Janeiro	
	4	57.14	Peaty #4		22 July 2019	Gwangju	
	5	57.37	Peaty #5		26 July 2021	Tokyo	
	6	57.39	Peaty #6		14 April 2021	London	
	7	57.47	Peaty #7		24 July 2017	Budapest	
	8	57.55	Peaty #8		6 August 2016	Rio de Janeiro	
	9	57.56	Peaty #9		24 July 2021	Tokyo	
	10	57.59	Peaty #10		21 July 2019	Gwangju	
	11	57.62	Peaty #11		6 August 2016	Rio de Janeiro	
	12	57.63	Peaty #12		25 July 2021	Tokyo	
	13	57.66	Peaty #13		18 May 2021	Budapest	
	14	57.67	Peaty #14		17 May 2021	Budapest	
2	15	57.69	Qin Haiyang	China	24 July 2023	Fukuoka	
2	15	57.69	Qin Haiyang	China	6 October 2023	Berlin	
	17	57.70	Peaty #15		14 April 2021	London	
	18	57.75	Peaty #16		23 July 2017	Budapest	
	19	57.76	Qin #3		25 September 2023	Hangzhou	
	20	57.79	Peaty #17		18 April 2017	Sheffield	
3	21	57.80	Arno Kamminga	Netherlands	24 July 2021	Tokyo	
	22	57.82	Qin #4		23 July 2023	Fukuoka	
	22	57.82	Qin #5		20 October 2023	Budapest	
	24	57.87	Peaty #18		16 April 2019	Glasgow	
	25	57.89	Peaty #19		3 August 2018	Glasgow	
4		58.01	Van Mathias	United States	20 June 2026	Indianapolis	
5		58.14	Michael Andrew	United States	13 June 2021	Omaha	
6		58.26	Nicolò Martinenghi	Italy	19 June 2022	Budapest	
6		58.26	Nicolò Martinenghi	Italy	12 August 2022	Rome	
7		58.29	Ilya Shymanovich	Belarus	24 March 2019	Marseille	
8		58.36	Nic Fink	United States	30 June 2023	Indianapolis	
9		58.46	Cameron van der Burgh	South Africa	29 July 2012	London	
9		58.46	James Wilby	Great Britain	22 July 2019	Gwangju	
11		58.53	Kirill Prigoda	Russia	27 July 2025	Singapore	
12		58.54	Shin Ohashi	Japan	13 August 2026	Irvine	
13		58.57	Dong Zhihao	China	17 June 2026	Hangzhou	
14		58.58	Brenton Rickard	Australia	27 July 2009	Rome	
15		58.63	Yan Zibei	China	22 July 2019	Gwangju	
16		58.64	Hugues Duboscq	France	27 July 2009	Rome	
16		58.64	Kevin Cordes	United States	23 July 2017	Budapest	
17		58.67	Ihor Borysyk	Ukraine	13 June 2009	Kharkiv	
19		58.68	Ivan Kozhakin	Russia	11 August 2026	Paris	
20		58.71	Alexander Dale Oen	Norway	25 July 2011	Shanghai	
21		58.72	Evgenii Somov	Russia	16 May 2024	Atlanta	
22		58.73	Federico Poggio	Italy	14 April 2023	Riccione	
22		58.73	Sun Jiajun	China	20 April 2024	Shenzhen	
24		58.74	Andrew Wilson	United States	14 June 2021	Omaha	
24		58.74	Lucas Matzerath	Germany	23 July 2023	Fukuoka	

=== Men short course ===
- Correct as of October 2026

Ath.#	Perf.#	Time	Athlete	Nation	Date	Place	Ref.
1	1	55.14	Van Mathias	United States	29 October 2026	Westmont	
2	2	55.28	Ilya Shymanovich	Belarus	26 November 2021	Eindhoven	
	3	55.32	Shymanovich #2		19 November 2021	Eindhoven	
	4	55.34	Shymanovich #3		19 December 2020	Brest	
3	5	55.41	Adam Peaty	Great Britain	22 November 2020	Budapest	
	6	55.45	Shymanovich #4		3 November 2021	Kazan	
4	7	55.47	Qin Haiyang	China	12 December 2024	Budapest	
	8	55.48	Mathias #2		29 October 2026	Westmont	
	9	55.49	Peaty #2		15 November 2020	Budapest	
	9	55.49	Shymanovich #5		22 November 2020	Budapest	
5	9	55.49	Kirill Prigoda	Russia	12 December 2024	Budapest	
	12	55.51	Prigoda #2		9 November 2025	Kazan	
6	13	55.54	Caspar Corbeau	Netherlands	2 December 2025	Lublin	
	14	55.55	Corbeau #2		23 October 2025	Toronto	
7	15	55.56	Nic Fink	United States	4 December 2021	Eindhoven	
	16	55.59	Shymanovich #6		4 December 2021	Eindhoven	
	16	55.59	Corbeau #3		7 November 2025	Ghent	
	18	55.60	Shymanovich #7		12 December 2024	Budapest	
8	19	55.61	Cameron van der Burgh	South Africa	15 November 2009	Berlin	
	19	55.61	Qin #2		31 October 2024	Singapore	
	21	55.63	Shymanovich #8		19 September 2021	Naples	
9	21	55.63	Nicolo Martinenghi	Italy	4 November 2021	Kazan	
	23	55.69	Shymanovich #9		15 November 2020	Budapest	
	24	55.70	Shymanovich #10		17 December 2021	Abu Dhabi	
	25	55.72	Shymanovich #11		31 October 2024	Singapore	
10		55.74	Emre Sakçı	Turkey	10 November 2020	Budapest	
11		55.77	Yuya Hinomoto	Japan	16 October 2021	Tokyo	
12		55.79	Arno Kamminga	Netherlands	4 November 2021	Kazan	
13		55.82	Yusei Imaizumi	Japan	10 October 2026	Saga	
14		55.91	Denis Petrashov	Kyrgyzstan	12 December 2024	Budapest	
15		56.11	Yasuhiro Koseki	Japan	26 October 2019	Tokyo	
15		56.11	Yasuhiro Koseki	Japan	31 October 2020	Budapest	
16		56.15	Fabio Scozzoli	Italy	16 December 2017	Copenhagen	
17		56.16	Oleg Kostin	Russia	19 November 2017	Kazan	
17		56.16	Fabian Schwingenschlögl	Germany	28 October 2021	Kazan	
17		56.16	Sun Jiajun	China	18 October 2024	Shanghai	
20		56.21	Simone Cerasuolo	Italy	2 December 2025	Lublin	
21		56.23	Brian Benzing	United States	29 October 2026	Westmont	
22		56.25	Felipe França Silva	Brazil	4 September 2014	Guaratinguetá	
22		56.25	Danil Semianinov	Russia	21 November 2022	Kazan	
24		56.27	Taku Taniguchi	Japan	19 October 2024	Tokyo	
24		56.27	Luka Mladenovic	Austria	3 December 2025	Lublin	

=== Women long course ===
- Correct as of August 2026

Ath.#	Perf.#	Time	Athlete	Nation	Date	Place	Ref.
1	1	1:04.13	Lilly King	United States	25 July 2017	Budapest	
2	2	1:04.35	Rūta Meilutytė	Lithuania	29 July 2013	Barcelona	
3	3	1:04.36	Yulia Yefimova	Russia	24 July 2017	Budapest	
4	4	1:04.39	Tang Qianting	China	21 April 2024	Shenzhen	
	5	1:04.42	Meilutytė #2		30 July 2013	Barcelona	
5	6	1:04.45	Jessica Hardy	United States	7 August 2009	Federal Way	
	7	1:04.52	Meilutytė #3		29 July 2013	Barcelona	
	8	1:04.53	King #2		24 July 2017	Budapest	
	9	1:04.62	Meilutytė #4		25 July 2023	Fukuoka	
	10	1:04.67	Meilutytė #5		24 July 2023	Fukuoka	
	11	1:04.68	Tang #2		20 April 2024	Shenzhen	
	12	1:04.72	King #3		14 June 2021	Omaha	
	13	1:04.75	King #4		30 June 2023	Indianapolis	
	14	1:04.79	King #5		15 June 2021	Omaha	
	15	1:04.82	Yefimova #2		17 June 2017	Canet-en-Roussillon	
6	15	1:04.82	Tatjana Smith	South Africa	25 July 2021	Tokyo	
7	17	1:04.84	Rebecca Soni	United States	27 July 2009	Rome	
8	18	1:04.87	Angharad Evans	Great Britain	12 August 2026	Paris	
	19	1:04.91	Soni #2		25 July 2011	Shanghai	
9	20	1:04.92	Evgeniia Chikunova	Russia	19 April 2023	Kazan	
	21	1:04.93	Soni #3		28 July 2009	Rome	
	21	1:04.93	Soni #4		19 August 2010	Irvine	
	21	1:04.93	King #6		8 August 2016	Rio de Janeiro	
	21	1:04.93	King #7		23 July 2019	Gwangju	
	25	1:04.95	King #8		30 June 2017	Indianapolis	
10	25	1:04.95	Lydia Jacoby	United States	27 July 2021	Tokyo	
11		1:05.03	Katie Meili	United States	25 July 2017	Budapest	
12		1:05.09	Leisel Jones	Australia	20 March 2006	Melbourne	
13		1:05.19	Reona Aoki	Japan	2 March 2022	Tokyo	
13		1:05.19	Anna Elendt	Germany	29 July 2025	Singapore	
15		1:05.27	Kate Douglass	United States	29 July 2025	Singapore	
16		1:05.32	Ji Liping	China	29 August 2009	Beijing	
16		1:05.32	McKenzie Siroky	United States	13 August 2026	Irvine	
18		1:05.35	Katy Freeman	United States	7 August 2009	Federal Way	
19		1:05.37	Annie Lazor	United States	14 June 2021	Omaha	
20		1:05.41	Mona McSharry	Ireland	12 August 2026	Paris	
21		1:05.44	Benedetta Pilato	Italy	21 June 2024	Rome	
22		1:05.47	Qi Hui	China	19 October 2009	Jinan	
22		1:05.47	Lara van Niekerk	South Africa	2 August 2022	Birmingham	
24		1:05.48	Kaitlyn Dobler	United States	30 June 2023	Indianapolis	
25		1:05.53	Satomi Suzuki	Japan	14 September 2025	Kusatsu	

=== Women short course ===
- Correct as of December 2025

Ath.#	Perf.#	Time	Athlete	Nation	Date	Place	Ref.
1	1	1:02.36	Rūta Meilutytė	Lithuania	12 October 2013	Moscow	
1	1	1:02.36	Alia Atkinson	Jamaica	6 December 2014	Doha	
1	1	1:02.36	Alia Atkinson	Jamaica	26 August 2016	Chartres	
3	4	1:02.37	Tang Qianting	China	11 December 2024	Budapest	
	5	1:02.38	Tang #2		12 December 2024	Budapest	
	6	1:02.40	Atkinson #3		21 October 2016	Singapore	
	7	1:02.43	Meilutytė #2		5 December 2014	Doha	
	8	1:02.46	Meilutytė #3		6 December 2014	Doha	
4	9	1:02.50	Lilly King	United States	22 November 2020	Budapest	
	10	1:02.53	Tang #3		19 October 2024	Shanghai	
	11	1:02.54	Atkinson #4		1 November 2014	Singapore	
	12	1:02.66	Atkinson #5		15 November 2020	Budapest	
	12	1:02.66	Tang #4		25 September 2024	Wuhan	
	14	1:02.67	Atkinson #6		11 August 2017	Eindhoven	
	14	1:02.67	King #2		15 December 2022	Melbourne	
	16	1:02.68	Atkinson #7		29 October 2016	Hong Kong	
5	17	1:02.70	Rebecca Soni	United States	19 December 2009	Manchester	
	18	1:02.74	Atkinson #8		16 November 2018	Singapore	
	19	1:02.77	Meilutytė #4		4 November 2022	Indianapolis	
	19	1:02.77	Tang #5		26 September 2024	Wuhan	
	21	1:02.79	Tang #6		25 October 2026	Beijing	
	22	1:02.80	Atkinson #9		5 October 2018	Budapest	
	22	1:02.80	King #3		12 December 2024	Budapest	
	24	1:02.82	Tang #7		25 October 2024	Incheon	
6	24	1:02.82	Eneli Jefimova	Estonia	3 December 2025	Lublin	
7		1:02.90	Kate Douglass	United States	11 October 2025	Carmel	
8		1:02.91	Yulia Yefimova	Russia	3 September 2016	Moscow	
9		1:02.92	Katie Meili	United States	30 August 2016	Berlin	
10		1:03.00	Leisel Jones	Australia	14 November 2009	Berlin	
11		1:03.30	Jessica Hardy	United States	14 November 2009	Berlin	
12		1:03.41	Alina Zmushka	Belarus	12 December 2024	Budapest	
13		1:03.45	Angharad Evans	Great Britain	11 December 2024	Budapest	
14		1:03.50	Sophie Hansson	Sweden	20 December 2021	Abu Dhabi	
15		1:03.53	Evgeniia Chikunova	Russia	24 November 2022	Kazan	
16		1:03.55	Benedetta Pilato	Italy	15 November 2020	Budapest	
17		1:03.57	Molly Hannis	United States	22 November 2020	Budapest	
18		1:03.61	Florine Gaspard	Belgium	2 December 2025	Lublin	
19		1:03.69	Annie Lazor	United States	22 November 2020	Budapest	
20		1:03.71	Nika Godun	Russia	24 November 2022	Kazan	
21		1:03.73	Sarah Katsoulis	Australia	21 November 2009	Singapore	
22		1:03.74	Rikke Møller Pedersen	Denmark	10 August 2013	Berlin	
23		1:03.80	Breeja Larson	United States	20 October 2019	Lewisville	
24		1:03.82	Kotomi Kato	Japan	10 October 2026	Saga	
25		1:03.84	Mona McSharry	Ireland	24 October 2025	Toronto	

== Olympic champions ==
=== Men ===
Edition	Winner	Time	Notes	Ref.
Mexico City 1968	Don McKenzie (USA)	1:07.7	OR	
(West Germany) Munich 1972	Nobutaka Taguchi (JPN)	1:04.94	WR	
(Canada) Montreal 1976	John Hencken (USA)	1:03.11	WR	
(Soviet Union) Moscow 1980	Duncan Goodhew (GBR)	1:03.34		
(United States) Los Angeles 1984	Steve Lundquist (USA)	1:01.65	WR	
(South Korea) Seoul 1988	Adrian Moorhouse (GBR)	1:02.04		
(Spain) Barcelona 1992	Nelson Diebel (USA)	1:01.50	OR	
(United States) Atlanta 1996	Frédérik Deburghgraeve (BEL)	1:00.65	(Note: Frédérik Deburghgraeve set a world record of 1:00.60 in the heats.)	
(Australia) Sydney 2000	Domenico Fioravanti (ITA)	1:00.46	OR	
(Greece) Athens 2004	Kosuke Kitajima (JPN)	1:00.08	(Note: Brendan Hansen set an Olympic record of 1:00.01 in the semifinals.)	
(China) Beijing 2008	Kosuke Kitajima (JPN)	58.91	WR	
(United Kingdom) London 2012	Cameron van der Burgh (RSA)	58.46	WR	
(Brazil) Rio de Janeiro 2016	Adam Peaty (GBR)	57.13	WR	
(Japan) Tokyo 2020	Adam Peaty (GBR)	57.37		
(France) Paris 2024	Nicolò Martinenghi (ITA)	59.01		

=== Women ===
Edition	Winner	Time	Notes	Ref.
Mexico City 1968	Đurđica Bjedov (YUG)	1:15.8	OR	
(West Germany) Munich 1972	Cathy Carr (USA)	1:13.58	WR	
(Canada) Montreal 1976	Hannelore Anke (GDR)	1:11.16	(Note: Hannelore Anke set a world record of 1:10.86 in the semifinals.)	
(Soviet Union) Moscow 1980	Ute Geweniger (GDR)	1:10.22	(Note: Ute Geweniger set a world record of 1:10.11 in the heats.)	
(United States) Los Angeles 1984	Petra van Staveren (NED)	1:09.88	OR	
(South Korea) Seoul 1988	Tanya Dangalakova (BUL)	1:07.95	OR	
(Spain) Barcelona 1992	Yelena Rudkovskaya (EUN)	1:08.00		
(United States) Atlanta 1996	Penelope Heyns (RSA)	1:07.73	(Note: Penelope Heyns set a world record of 1:07.02 in the heats.)	
(Australia) Sydney 2000	Megan Quann (USA)	1:07.05		
(Greece) Athens 2004	Luo Xuejuan (CHN)	1:06.64	OR	
(China) Beijing 2008	Leisel Jones (AUS)	1:05.17	OR	
(United Kingdom) London 2012	Rūta Meilutytė (LTU)	1:05.47		
(Brazil) Rio de Janeiro 2016	Lilly King (USA)	1:04.93	OR	
(Japan) Tokyo 2020	Lydia Jacoby (USA)	1:04.95	(Note: Tatjana Smith set an Olympic record of 1:04.82 in the semifinals.)	
(France) Paris 2024	Tatjana Smith (RSA)	1:05.28		

== World champions (long course) ==
=== Men ===
Edition	Winner	Time	Notes	Ref.
(Socialist Federal Republic of Yugoslavia) Belgrade 1973	John Hencken (USA)	1:04.02	WR	
(Colombia) Cali 1975	David Wilkie (GBR)	1:04.26	CR	
(West Germany) West Berlin 1978	Walter Kusch (FRG)	1:03.56	CR	
(Ecuador) Guayaquil 1982	Steve Lundquist (USA)	1:02.75	CR	
(Spain) Madrid 1986	Victor Davis (CAN)	1:02.71	CR	
(Australia) Perth 1991	Norbert Rózsa (HUN)	1:01.45	WR	
(Italy) Rome 1994	Norbert Rózsa (HUN)	1:01.24	CR	
(Australia) Perth 1998	Frédérik Deburghgraeve (BEL)	1:01.34		
(Japan) Fukuoka 2001	Roman Sludnov (RUS)	1:00.16	(Note: Roman Sludnov set a world record of 59.94 in the semifinals.)	
(Spain) Barcelona 2003	Kosuke Kitajima (JPN)	59.78	WR	
(Canada) Montreal 2005	Brendan Hansen (USA)	59.37	CR	
(Australia) Melbourne 2007	Brendan Hansen (USA)	59.80		
(Italy) Rome 2009	Brenton Rickard (AUS)	58.58	WR	
(China) Shanghai 2011	Alexander Dale Oen (NOR)	58.71		
(Spain) Barcelona 2013	Christian Sprenger (AUS)	58.79		
(Russia) Kazan 2015	Adam Peaty (GBR)	58.52	(Note: Adam Peaty set a championship record of 58.18 in the semifinals.)	
(Hungary) Budapest 2017	Adam Peaty (GBR)	57.47	CR	
(South Korea) Gwangju 2019	Adam Peaty (GBR)	57.14	(Note: Adam Peaty set a world record of 56.88 in the semifinals.)	
(Hungary) Budapest 2022	Nicolò Martinenghi (ITA)	58.26		
(Japan) Fukuoka 2023	Qin Haiyang (CHN)	57.69		
(Qatar) Doha 2024	Nic Fink (USA)	58.57		
Singapore 2025	Qin Haiyang (CHN)	58.23		

=== Women ===
Edition	Winner	Time	Notes	Ref.
(Socialist Federal Republic of Yugoslavia) Belgrade 1973	Renate Vogel (GDR)	1:13.74	CR	
(Colombia) Cali 1975	Hannelore Anke (GDR)	1:12.72	CR	
(West Germany) West Berlin 1978	Yuliya Bogdanova (URS)	1:10.31	WR	
(Ecuador) Guayaquil 1982	Ute Geweniger (GDR)	1:09.14	CR	
(Spain) Madrid 1986	Sylvia Gerasch (GDR)	1:08.11	WR	
(Australia) Perth 1991	Linley Frame (AUS)	1:08.81		
(Italy) Rome 1994	Samantha Riley (AUS)	1:07.69	WR	
(Australia) Perth 1998	Kristy Kowal (USA)	1:08.42	CR	
(Japan) Fukuoka 2001	Luo Xuejuan (CHN)	1:07.18	CR	
(Spain) Barcelona 2003	Luo Xuejuan (CHN)	1:06.80	(Note: Leisel Jones set a world record of 1:06.37 in the semifinals.)	
(Canada) Montreal 2005	Leisel Jones (AUS)	1:06.25	(Note: Jessica Hardy set a world record of 1:06.20 in the semifinals.)	
(Australia) Melbourne 2007	Leisel Jones (AUS)	1:05.72	CR	
(Italy) Rome 2009	Rebecca Soni (USA)	1:04.93	(Note: Rebecca Soni set a world record of 1:04.84 in the semifinals.)	
(China) Shanghai 2011	Rebecca Soni (USA)	1:05.05		
(Spain) Barcelona 2013	Rūta Meilutytė (LTU)	1:04.42	(Note: Rūta Meilutytė set a world record of 1:04.35 in the semifinals.)	
(Russia) Kazan 2015	Yuliya Yefimova (RUS)	1:05.66		
(Hungary) Budapest 2017	Lilly King (USA)	1:04.13	WR	
(South Korea) Gwangju 2019	Lilly King (USA)	1:04.93		
(Hungary) Budapest 2022	Benedetta Pilato (ITA)	1:05.93		
(Japan) Fukuoka 2023	Rūta Meilutytė (LTU)	1:04.62		
(Qatar) Doha 2024	Tang Qianting (CHN)	1:05.27		
Singapore 2025	Anna Elendt (GER)	1:05.19		

== World champions (short course) ==
=== Men ===
Edition	Winner	Time	Notes	Ref.
(Spain) Palma de Mallorca 1993	Phil Rogers (AUS)	59.56	CR	
(Brazil) Rio de Janeiro 1995	Mark Warnecke (GER)	59.89		
(Sweden) Gothenburg 1997	Patrik Isaksson (SWE)	59.99		
Hong Kong 1999	Patrik Isaksson (SWE)	59.69		
(Greece) Athens 2000	Roman Sludnov (RUS)	58.57	(Note: Roman Sludnov set a world record of 58.51 in the semifinals.)	
(Russia) Moscow 2002	Oleh Lisohor (UKR)	58.33	CR	
(United States) Indianapolis 2004	Brendan Hansen (USA)	58.45		
(China) Shanghai 2006	Oleh Lisohor (UKR)	58.14	CR	
(United Kingdom) Manchester 2008	Ihor Borysyk (UKR)	57.74	CR	
(United Arab Emirates) Dubai 2010	Cameron van der Burgh (RSA)	56.80	CR	
(Turkey) Istanbul 2012	Fabio Scozzoli (ITA)	57.10		
(Qatar) Doha 2014	Felipe França Silva (BRA)	56.29	CR	
(Canada) Windsor 2016	Marco Koch (GER)	56.77		
(China) Hangzhou 2018	Cameron van der Burgh (RSA)	56.01	CR	
(United Arab Emirates) Abu Dhabi 2021	Ilya Shymanovich (BLR)	55.70	CR	
(Australia) Melbourne 2022	Nic Fink (USA)	55.88		
(Hungary) Budapest 2024	Qin Haiyang (CHN)	55.47	CR	

=== Women ===
Edition	Winner	Time	Notes	Ref.
(Spain) Palma de Mallorca 1993	Dai Guohong (CHN)	1:06.58	WR	
(Brazil) Rio de Janeiro 1995	Samantha Riley (AUS)	1:05.70	WR	
(Sweden) Gothenburg 1997	Kristy Ellem (AUS)	1:08.27		
Hong Kong 1999	Masami Tanaka (JPN)	1:06.38		
(Greece) Athens 2000	Sarah Poewe (RSA)	1:06.21		
(Russia) Moscow 2002	Emma Igelström (SWE)	1:05.38	WR	
(United States) Indianapolis 2004	Brooke Hanson (AUS)	1:05.36	CR	
(China) Shanghai 2006	Tara Kirk (USA)	1:05.25	CR	
(United Kingdom) Manchester 2008	Jessica Hardy (USA)	1:04.22	CR	
(United Arab Emirates) Dubai 2010	Rebecca Soni (USA)	1:03.98	CR	
(Turkey) Istanbul 2012	Rūta Meilutytė (LTU)	1:03.52	CR	
(Qatar) Doha 2014	Alia Atkinson (JAM)	1:02.36	=WR	
(Canada) Windsor 2016	Alia Atkinson (JAM)	1:03.03		
(China) Hangzhou 2018	Alia Atkinson (JAM)	1:03.51		
(United Arab Emirates) Abu Dhabi 2021	Tang Qianting (CHN)	1:03.47		
(Australia) Melbourne 2022	Lilly King (USA)	1:02.67		
(Hungary) Budapest 2024	Tang Qianting (CHN)	1:02.38		
