= Ellen Ingvadóttir =

Icelandic swimmer

Personal information
- Born: 13 January 1953 (age 73) Reykjavík, Iceland

Sport
- Sport: Swimming

Ellen Ingvadóttir (born 13 January 1953) is an Icelandic former swimmer. She competed in three events at the 1968 Summer Olympics.

Ellen was born in Reykjavík, one of three daughters of Ingvi Þorsteinsson and his wife Liv Þorsteinsson, a Norwegian.

In 1968, when she was 15, she competed in three events at the Summer Olympic Games in Mexico City: women's 100-metre breaststroke, women's 200-metre breaststroke, and women's 200-metre individual medley. She did not advance beyond the first heat in any event.

As of 2002, she was working as an interpreter and translator.
