= Sharon Wichman =

American swimmer (born 1952)

Personal information
- Full name: Sharon Lynn Wichman
- National team: United States
- Born: May 13, 1952 (age 74) Detroit, Michigan, U.S.
- Height: 5 ft 9 in (1.75 m)
- Weight: 132 lb (60 kg)

Sport
- Sport: Swimming
- Strokes: Breaststroke
- Club: Club Olympia; Fort Wayne, In.
- Coach: Steven Hunyadfi
Medal record
Women's swimming
Representing the United States
Olympic Games
Gold medal – first place	1968 Mexico City	200 m breaststroke
Bronze medal – third place	1968 Mexico City	100 m breaststroke

Sharon Lynn Wichman (born May 13, 1952), also known by her married name Sharon Jones, is an American former competition swimmer and 1968 Olympic champion in the breaststroke.

== Early age group swimming ==
Sharon's family left Detroit when she was young, and she swam for a while in Toledo, Ohio. One of her earliest age group coaches was Coach Glen Hummer who coached at the YMCA in Huntington, near Fort Wayne. Besides Sharon, Hummer had also taught swimming technique to Hall of Fame Coach George Haines.

=== Club Olympia ===
At eleven, Sharon started swimming for Fort Wayne's Club Olympia in Fort Wayne, Indiana, coached by Don Carter, and then by her Olympic trainer, and world-renowned Coach Steven Hunyadfi. By 16, prepping for the Olympics, Sharon would practice up to four hours a day, and swim up to 13,000 yards or seven miles a day. Her father, a cost-analyst and tool engineer, was transferred to Mexico in 1966, where the family lived just North of Mexico City and Sharon continued her training, but she could no longer train with her backstroke specialist Hunyadfi and believed she needed better coaching to make the Olympics. She received minimal training in Mexico City, and returning to the United States, she trained with Hunyadfi for the 1967 U.S. Summer National Championship.

Wichman was born in Detroit, Michigan, but after a move attended Chester Lane Junior High School in Fort Wayne, Indiana where, already a swimmer, she began dreaming of competing in the Olympics. A straight "A" student by 16, she graduated in 1970 from Fort Wayne's R. Nelson Snider High School. Though not coached together, five years later in 1975, Snider High would graduate 1976 Montreal Olympic gold medalist Matt Vogel.

== '68 Indiana Junior Olympics ==
Wichman at the 68 Junior Indiana Olympics

Sharon bested a few breaststroke records prepping for the 68 Olympics. In the Spring of '68, she won the 200-yard breaststroke and was second in the 100 at the Pittsburgh Indoor National meet, though she lacked a world record. Under the watchful eye of her coach Steven Hudyadfi, a former Hungarian National and Italian Olympic swim team coach, she broke the National Junior Olympics record at Indianapolis's AAU Indiana Junior Olympics in the 100-meter breaststroke by a substantial 3.5 seconds with a time of 1:19.3. Sharon also broke the 200-meter breastroke record with a time of 2:47.6 in the final round.

== '68 Summer Olympic medals ==
While a Junior at Snider High School, in her most noteworthy performance she represented the United States as a 16-year-old at the 1968 Summer Olympics in Mexico City, having qualified to compete in both breaststroke events.

Sharon benefitted from the training she received at the Olympic training camp in Colorado Springs in preparation for the altitude in Mexico City, and believed she was inspired by Olympic Coach Frank Elm.

=== Gold medal ===
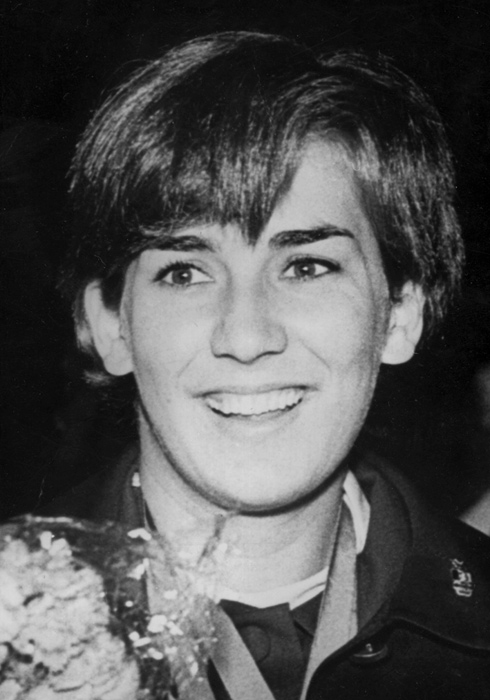
Bjedov at '68 Olympics

Wichman received a gold medal for winning the women's 200-meter breaststroke (2:44.4) on October 23, 1968, beating Đurđica Bjedov of Yugoslavia by two seconds, and breaking the old Olympic record by around the same margin. With her victory, Sharon became the first U.S. breaststroke champion in Olympic history.

=== Bronze medal ===
She also received a bronze medal for her third place in the women's 100-meter breaststroke (1:16.1), finishing less than two seconds behind gold medalist Bjedov (1:15.8) and only two-tenths of a second behind Soviet swimmer Galina Prozumenshchikova (1:15.9).

== Post-Olympic competition ==
Continuing to swim, in July 1969, she competed in the Santa Clara International Invitational, one of the top international meets of the year, at the Santa Clara Swim Center in Santa Clara, California. Continuing successful competition in 1969, she won the 100-meter breaststroke title in the national short course championship and was able to place in the top three in most subsequent national competitions. She later took international titles at Bremen, Germany in both the 100-meter and 200-meter breaststroke.

After college graduation, she coached swimming for the Tippecanoe County Swim team in Lafayette, Indiana while her husband attended Purdue. Sharon attended and swam for Lake Forest College in Illinois, helping the team to finish sixth in the NCAA Swim Championships, though she felt, despite being an Olympic medalist, she was not taken as a serious athlete by the Men's team swimmers. In 1976, she coached

=== Later life ===
She graduated from college, married David Jones in 1973, and lived in nearby Churubusco, Indiana. The couple had two sons. As a result of a strong Baptist faith, after years of disciplined spending and cautious informed investments, Sharon and her husband David Jones started giving generous donations to a number of organizations, particularly her favorite, a Prison Fellowship. She also has worked driving a school bus to serve her community and give her time with children.

== Honors ==
She was inducted into the International Swimming Hall of Fame as an "Honor Swimmer" in 1991.

== See also ==
- List of members of the International Swimming Hall of Fame
- List of Olympic medalists in swimming (women)
