= Günter Tittes =

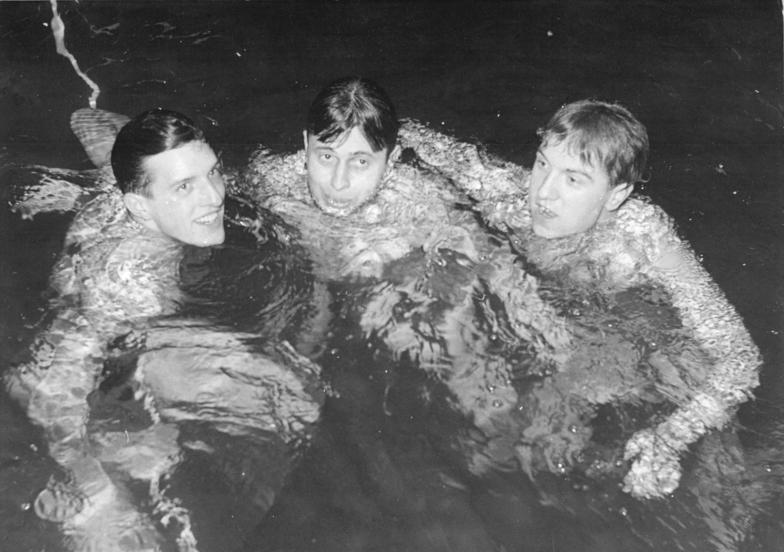
- Günter Tittes (right) in 1957

Personal information
- Born: 23 October 1936 (age 89) Greiz, Germany
- Height: 1.76 m (5 ft 9 in)
- Weight: 73 kg (161 lb)

Sport
- Sport: Swimming
- Club: ASK Vorwärts Rostock

Günter Tittes (born 23 October 1936) is a retired East German breaststroke swimmer. He competed at the 1960 Summer Olympics in the 4 × 100 m medley relay, but his team failed to reach the final. He won two national breaststroke titles in 1960 and 1961 and set a world record in the 100 m breaststroke in 1961.
