= Susannah Jones =

Susanna(h) Jones may refer to:

- Susannah Mushatt Jones (1899–2016), American supercentenarian
- Susannah Makeig-Jones (1881–1945), pottery designer
- Susanna Jones (born 1967), British writer

== See also ==
- Susie Jones (disambiguation)
- Sue Jones (disambiguation)
