= Karin Beyer =

East German swimmer

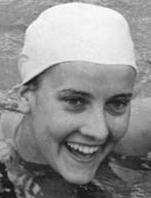
- Karin Beyer in 1962

Personal information
- Born: 30 July 1941 (age 84) Halberstadt, Germany

Sport
- Sport: Swimming
- Club: SC Chemie Halle

Karin Beyer (born 30 July 1941) is a former East German swimmer. She set three world records in the 100 m (1958, 1:20.3 and 1:19.6) and 200 m (1961, 2:48.0) breaststroke events. At the 1958 European Championships she finished fourth in the 4×100 m medley relay. The same year she was selected as East German Sportspersonality of the Year.

Between 1961 and 1965 she studied physiotherapy at a medical institute in Leipzig and later worked as a coach, retiring in 2002. She lives in Halle.
