= Galina Prozumenshchikova =

Soviet swimmer (1948–2015)

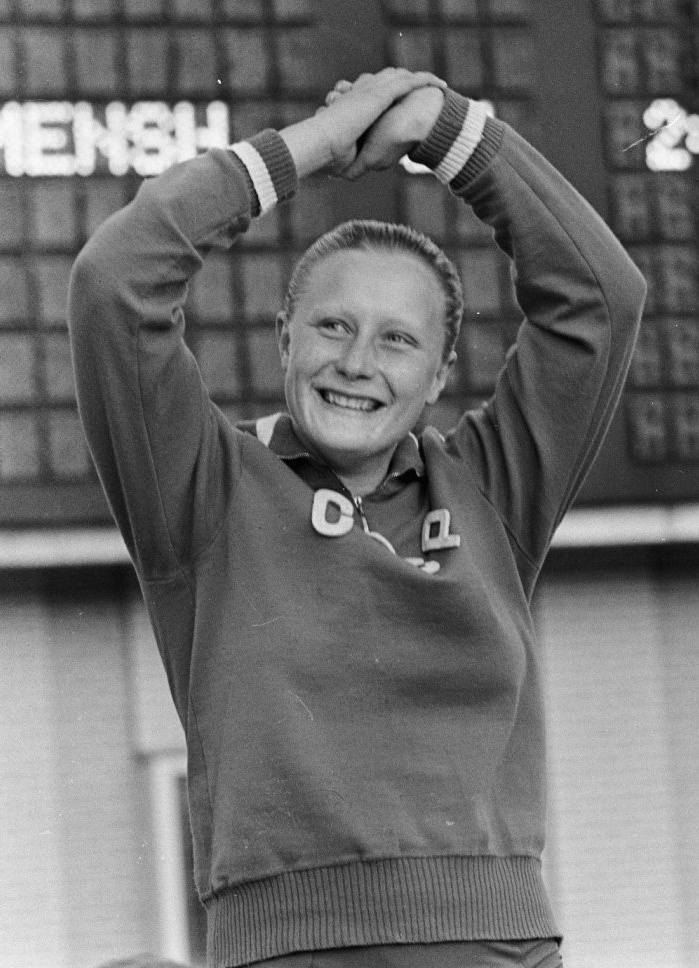
- Prozumenshchikova in 1966

Personal information
- Full name: Galina Nikolayevna Prozumenshchikova
- National team: Soviet Union
- Born: 26 November 1948 Sevastopol, Russian SFSR, Soviet Union
- Died: 19 July 2015 (aged 66) Moscow, Russia
- Height: 1.69 m (5 ft 7 in)
- Weight: 68 kg (150 lb)

Sport
- Sport: Swimming
- Strokes: Breaststroke
- Club: SKF Sevastopol; CSKA Moscow
Medal record
Representing the Soviet Union
Olympic Games
Gold medal – first place	1964 Tokyo	200 m breaststroke
Silver medal – second place	1968 Mexico City	100 m breaststroke
Bronze medal – third place	1968 Mexico City	200 m breaststroke
Silver medal – second place	1972 Munich	100 m breaststroke
Bronze medal – third place	1972 Munich	200 m breaststroke
European Championships
Gold medal – first place	1966 Utrecht	200 m breaststroke
Silver medal – second place	1966 Utrecht	4×100 m medley
Gold medal – first place	1970 Barcelona	100 m breaststroke
Gold medal – first place	1970 Barcelona	200 m breaststroke
Silver medal – second place	1970 Barcelona	4×100 m medley
Summer Universiade
Gold medal – first place	1970 Turin	100 m breaststroke
Gold medal – first place	1970 Turin	200 m breaststroke
Bronze medal – third place	1973 Moscow	100 m breaststroke

Galina Nikolayevna Prozumenshchikova (Russian: Галина Николаевна Прозуменщикова, IPA: [ɡɐˈlʲinə nʲɪkɐˈla(j)ɪvnə prəzʊˈmʲenʲɕːɪkəvə]; 26 November 1948 – 19 July 2015) was a Soviet breaststroke swimmer who also competed in medley relays. She won five Olympic medals in 1964, 1968 and 1972 and five European Championships medals in 1966 and 1970. Her first Olympic medal, the gold in 200 m breaststroke in 1964, was the first Olympic gold in swimming for the Soviet Union. From 1964 to 1966, she set five world records: four in 200 m and one in 100 m breaststroke events. Between 1963 and 1972, she won 15 national titles and set 27 national records.

== Biography ==
Galina was born on 26 November 1948 in Sevastopol, in the Russian SFSR of the Soviet Union. She married twice and therefore changed her last name first to Stepanova (Russian: Степанова, IPA: [sʲtʲɪˈpanəvə]) and then to Ivannikova (Russian: Иванникова, IPA: [ɪˈvanʲːɪkəvə]).

Her father, Nikolai Nikolayevich (1913–1991) was a submarine captain. Her mother, Sofia Petrovna (1922–1987) was a nurse and took part in World War II. Galina started swimming in a club in 1959 and until 1966 competed for SKF Sevastopol. By the time of her first Olympics in 1964, she had won several national and international competitions and set national and world records in the 200 m breaststroke. (Her favorite discipline was 100 m breaststroke, but it became an Olympic event only in 1968.) However, she underwent surgery for appendicitis in July, just before the Games, and was not in her top form. She also had a strong rival, Svetlana Babanina, who set a world record in the 100 m breaststroke before the 1964 Olympics. Nevertheless, Prozumenshchikova won the 200 m event, setting a new Olympic record and winning the first Soviet Olympic gold in swimming. Babanina finished third.

In 1966, Prozumenshchikova enrolled in the faculty of journalism of the Moscow State University (MSU) and moved to Moscow. That year, she set her final and fastest record for the 200 m breaststroke at 2:40.8—nearly seven full seconds lower than her first record of 2:47.7 in 1964—winning a gold medal in the event at the 1966 European Aquatics Championships, as well as taking silver in medley. Two years later, at the 1968 Summer Olympics, she came within one-tenth of a second of taking gold in the 100 m breaststroke. She settled for silver in the 100 m event and bronze in the 200 m breaststroke.

In 1969, Prozumenshchikova gave birth to a daughter, Irina, and was on the verge of retiring. However, she returned to competition in 1970, winning gold in the 100 m and 200 m breaststroke and another medley silver at the European Aquatics Championships that year. She swam for the Soviet Union in the 1972 Summer Olympics, repeating her 1968 performances in both the 100 m and 200 m to add two more Olympic medals to her tally, and retired the following year.

Prozumenshchikova graduated from MSU in 1976 and was writing sports columns for the major newspaper Izvestia. However, she soon left journalism, and between 1976 and 1980 worked as a sports functionary, and after 1980 as a swimming coach for children at CSKA. Along the way, in the 1970s, she remarried to economist Yuri Ivanovich Ivannikov (born 1950) and had a son, Grigory Yurievich, in 1979. In 1991, she competed in swimming again and set at least 35 national records in the "masters" category.

Prozumenshchikova died aged 66 in Moscow on 19 July 2015 after a long illness, according to the Russian Swimming Federation. Her body was cremated.

== Awards and honors ==
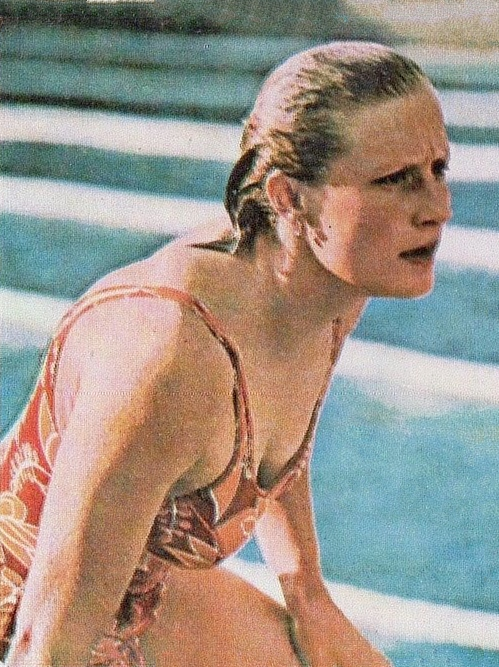
Prozumenshchikova c. 1972

In 2013, two years before her death, Prozumenshchikova was recognized as one of the "100 Greatest Swimmers in History" in a book by swim journalist John Lohn. She ranked at number 60 in the book, which highlighted her Olympic and European medals and prowess in setting new world records.

Prozumenshchikova also received special distinctions from her country, including:

- Order of the Red Banner of Labour (1972)
- Order of Friendship of Peoples (1993)
- Medal "For Distinguished Labour" (twice)

== See also ==
- List of members of the International Swimming Hall of Fame
- World record progression 100 metres breaststroke
- World record progression 200 metres breaststroke
