= Suzy Jones =

American swimmer (born 1948)

Personal information
- Full name: Susan Jean Jones
- Nickname: "Suzy"
- National team: United States
- Born: May 12, 1948 (age 78) Palo Alto, California, U.S.
- Occupation: Swimming coach
- Height: 5 ft 6 in (1.68 m)
- Weight: 128 lb (58 kg)

Sport
- Sport: Swimming
- Strokes: Breaststroke
- Club: Santa Clara Swim Club
- Coach: George Haines (Santa Clara)

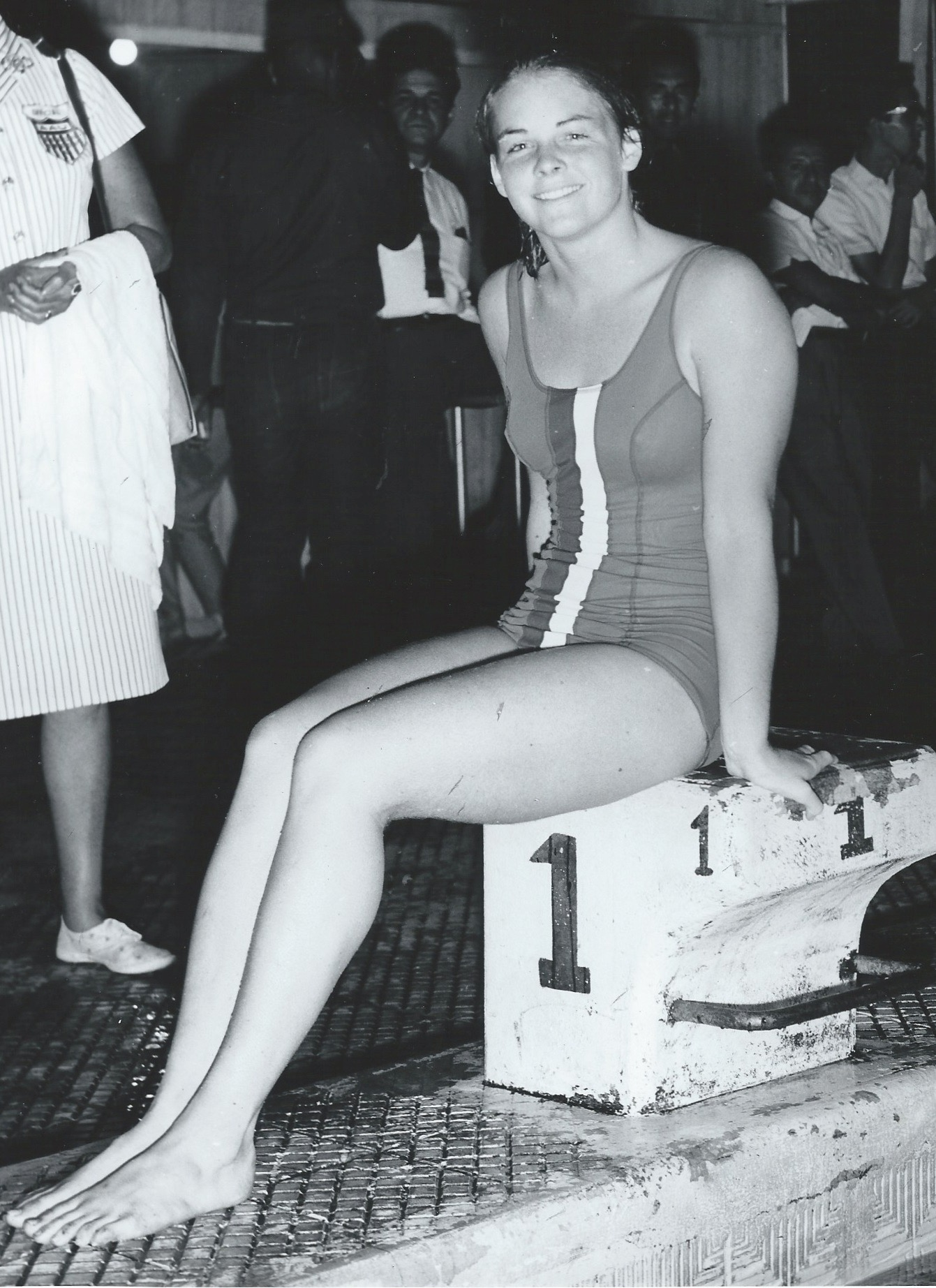

Susan Jean Jones (born May 12, 1948), also known by her married name Suzy Jones Roy, is an American former competitive swimmer, 1968 Mexico City Olympic swimmer, former World Record Holder, and swim coach.

== Mid-career swimming competition ==
Jones first attempted to qualify for the 1964 Olympic Team in the 100-meter breaststroke. She entered the finals with the fastest time in the preliminary heats, but did not succeed in repeating her performance and finished in 8th place.

In 1965, she joined the Santa Clara Swim Club under the coaching of the famed George Haines, where she set a world record in the 110-yard breaststroke and earned national rankings in the 100-meter and 200-meter breaststroke events.

After briefly retiring from swimming in 1966 and subsequently attending the University of Southern California (USC) as a freshman and sophomore, Jones again attempted to qualify for the Olympic Team in 1968.

== Olympic competition ==
At the 1968 U.S. Olympic trials, Jones placed third in the 100-meter breaststroke, qualifying for the Olympic team. She was one of the oldest swimmers on the women’s 1968 squad at the age of 20, and the first women’s swimmer over 19 on the U.S. women’s swimming team since 1948.

Jones represented the United States at the 1968 Summer Olympics in Mexico City. She swam breaststroke for the gold medal-winning U.S. team in the preliminary heats of the women’s 4x100 medley relay, but did not receive a medal under the 1968 Olympic rules because she did not swim in the event final.

She also competed in the semifinals of the women's 100-meter breaststroke, finishing in 10th place overall with a time of 1:18.6.

== Coaching and U.S. Masters competition ==
In 1975, Jones returned to her hometown in Los Altos, CA and took a full-time position as Aquatic Director swim coach of the Alpine Hills Tennis and Swim Club in Portola Valley, CA.

In 1976, Jones resumed swimming competitively in U.S. Masters Swimming. Over 25 years from 1976 to 2001, she set 30 USMS records in the 50, 100 and 200 yds/meters breaststroke events and the 100 yds/meters Individual Medley, along with 7 World Records in breaststroke events.

In 1988, Jones founded the Susan Roy Swim School, her family-owned business in Los Altos, CA, where she coached with her 4 sons through 2010. As of 2025, Jones continues to coach swimmers in the Portola Valley area and currently works at The Ladera Oaks Swim and Tennis Club.

== Personal life ==
Jones married Richard H. Roy III, on September 13, 1975. The couple reside in Mountain View, CA, and have four sons, Sean, Ryan, Kevin and Ricky, and four grandchildren.
