= Shlomit Nir =

Israeli swimmer

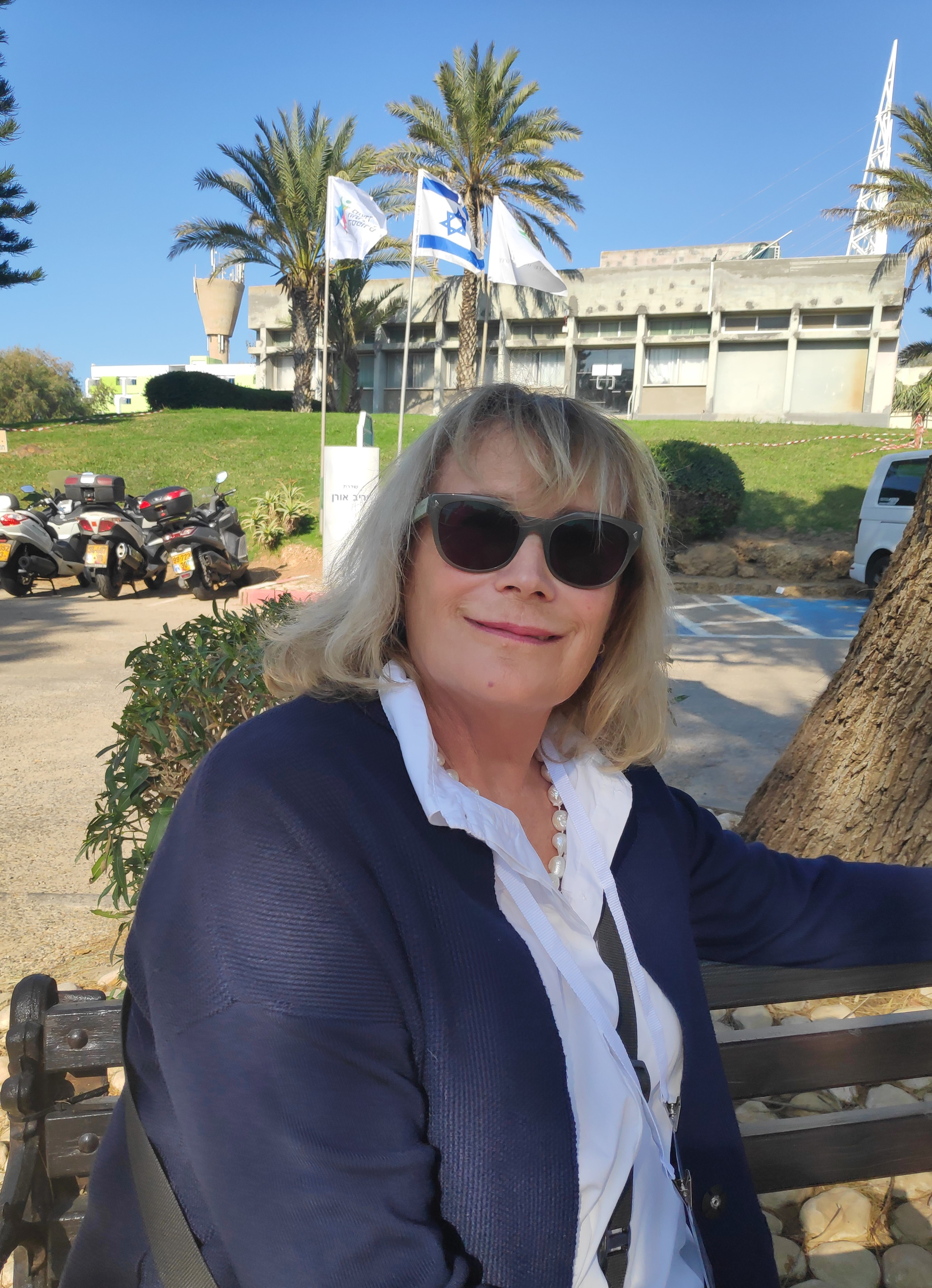
- Nir in 2019

Personal information
- Full name: Shlomit Nir-Toor
- National team: Israel
- Born: שלומית ניר; November 7, 1952 (age 73) Tiberias, HaTzafon, Israel

Sport
- Sport: Swimming
- Strokes: breaststroke
Medal record
Women's swimming
Representing Israel
Asian Games
Bronze medal – third place	1970 Bangkok	100 m breaststroke
Bronze medal – third place	1970 Bangkok	200 m breaststroke

Shlomit Nir (Hebrew: שלומית ניר; also "Nir-Toor"; born November 7, 1952) is an Israeli former Olympic swimmer.

== Early and personal life ==
Nir was born and raised on a kibbutz in Tiberias, HaTzafon, Israel. Her grandparents left Ukraine to start a kibbutz, which is where her father was born. Her brother was killed while fighting as a soldier in the Sinai in 1969. She has three children.

== Swimming career ==
Nir began swimming at age 11, and became the Israeli national champion within six months.

She competed for Israel at the 1965 Maccabiah Games, winning the gold medal in the women's 200 metre breastroke as a young teenager.

=== 1968 Olympics ===
Nir competed for Israel at the 1968 Summer Olympics, at the age of 15, in Mexico City. Swimming in the Women's 100 metre Breaststroke she took 3rd in her heat with a time of 1:20.9. Swimming in the Women's 200 metre Breaststroke she took 5th in her heat, again with a time of 2:58.5.

=== 1972 Olympics ===
Nir competed for Israel at the 1972 Summer Olympics, at the age of 19, in Munich, Germany. Swimming in the Women's 100 metre Breaststroke she took 5th in her heat with a time of 1:20.90. Swimming in the Women's 200 metre Breaststroke she took 6th in her heat with a time of 2:53.60. When she competed in the Olympics, she was 5 ft 6.5 in (169 cm) tall, and weighed 146 lb (66 kg).

She competed for Israel at the 1970 Asian Games in Bangkok, Thailand. In swimming, Nir won bronze medals in the 100 m breaststroke, in 1:20.6, and in the 200 m breaststroke, in 2:54.3.

=== Munich massacre ===
Nir was at the Olympic Village during the Munich massacre at the 1972 Olympics. She had planned to return to Israel soon after swimming her last race, to marry her fiancé. But the Israeli team head asked her to wait, to fly back with an injured fellow Israeli athlete. On September 5, others on the Israeli team were attacked in their dorms by members of the Palestinian terrorist group Black September. Two athletes fought back and were killed, while nine others were taken hostage.

The following day, German authorities took Nir, who had been staying in another building, and the remaining Israeli team members and coaches to the ninth floor of the building. From a window, Nir watched as two helicopters landed on the Olympic Village lawn. The helicopters were supposed to take the terrorists and the Israeli hostages to Fürstenfeldbruck Air Base, and from there they were to fly to Cairo.

Nir said:

We watched from the ninth floor window as the two buses arrived. Four blindfolded athletes with their hands tied together got off the first bus. They were put on the first helicopter. Then, another five hostages got off the second bus and climbed onto the second helicopter. That was the last image we saw. Although we were on the ninth floor, we could still see it well.

All nine hostages were killed in a failed German rescue operation at the airbase. For a year Nir kept having nightmares that she was "running away from the Arabs," underneath the Olympic Village. "I saw this place, the same location all the time, I couldn't run out of it." I would always be running, and terrorists with masks were chasing me."

Since the 1972 Munich Games, Nir has regularly attended commemorations for the killed athletes and met with fellow survivors.

== Later career ==
Nir as of 2012 worked for the Israel Ministry of Sport, and was Director of the Unit for the Advancement of Women in Sports at the Sport Management Division of the Israeli Ministry of Education.
