= Kiyoe Nakagawa =

Japanese swimmer

Personal information
- Born: 14 June 1951 (age 75) Osaka Prefecture, Japan

Sport
- Sport: Swimming
- Strokes: breaststroke

Kiyoe Nakagawa (中川 清江, Nakagawa Kiyoe; born 14 June 1951) is a Japanese former professional breaststroke swimmer. She competed in two events at the 1968 Summer Olympics.
