= Christl Filippovits =

Austrian swimmer (born 1944)

Personal information
- Born: 12 July 1944 (age 82) Schärding, Nazi Germany

Sport
- Sport: Swimming

Christl Filippovits (born 12 July 1944) is an Austrian former breaststroke swimmer. She competed at the 1960, 1964 and the 1968 Summer Olympics.
