= Sue McKenzie =

Australian swimmer

Personal information
- Born: 29 October 1950 (age 75) Melbourne, Australia

Sport
- Sport: Swimming

Sue McKenzie (born 29 October 1950) is an Australian former swimmer. She competed in two events at the 1968 Summer Olympics.
