= Jo-Anne Barnes =

Australian swimmer

Personal information
- Born: 24 December 1954 (age 71) Queensland, Australia

Sport
- Sport: Swimming
- Strokes: breaststroke

Jo-Anne Barnes (born 24 December 1954) is an Australian former breaststroke swimmer. She competed in two events at the 1968 Summer Olympics.
