= Marjan Janus =

Dutch swimmer (born 1952)

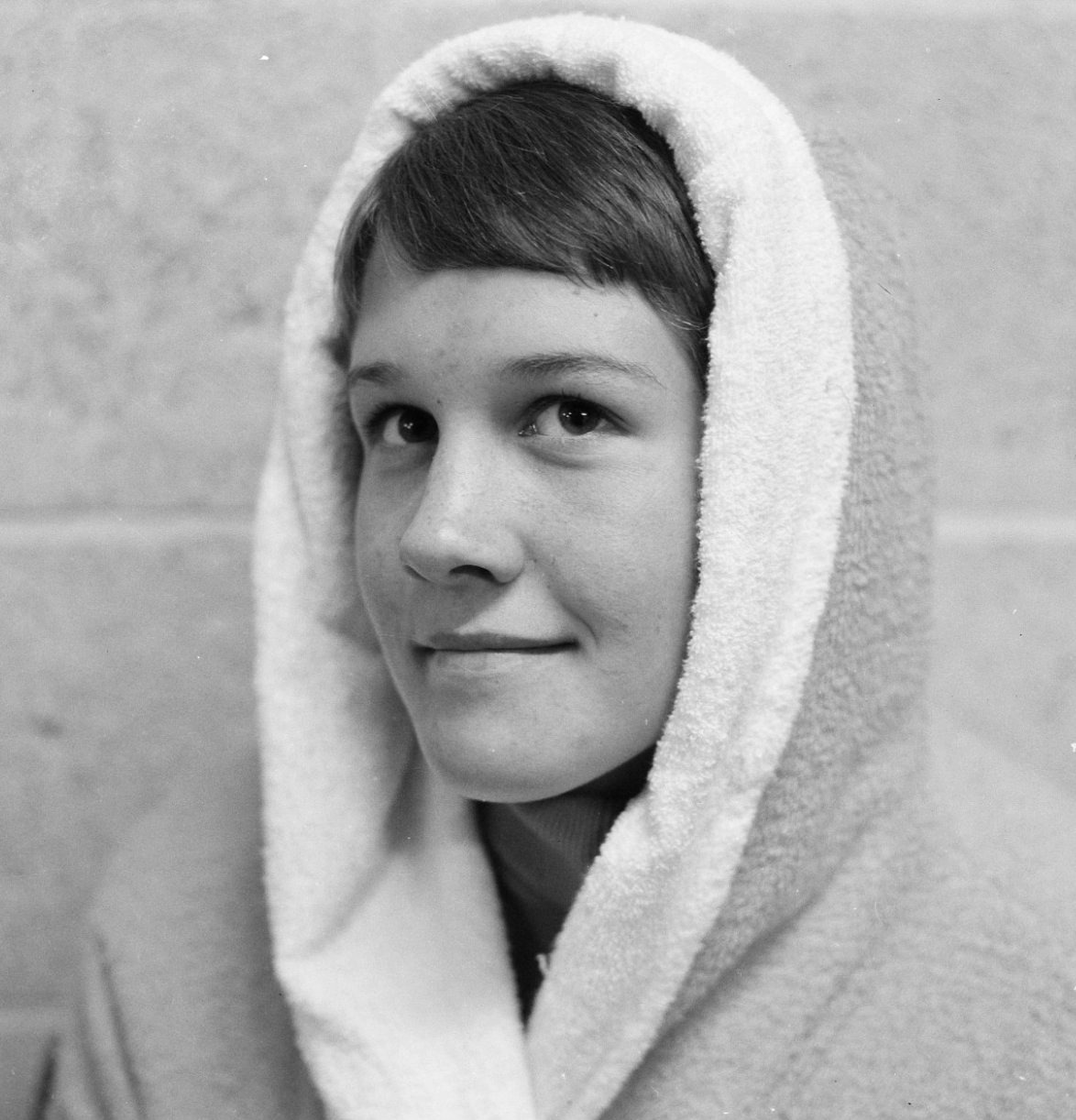
- Marjan Janus in 1966

Personal information
- Born: 31 January 1952 (age 73) Heemstede, Netherlands
- Height: 1.65 m (5 ft 5 in)
- Weight: 60 kg (130 lb)

Sport
- Sport: Swimming
- Club: Heemsteedse Zwem- en Poloclub (HPC)

Maria Alida Catharina "Marjan" Janus (born 31 January 1952) is a former breaststroke swimmer from the Netherlands. In 1968, she won the 100 m breaststroke event at the national championships, beating the long-time favorite Klenie Bimolt. She was therefore selected for the 1968 Summer Olympics, but failed to reach the final.
