= Tamara Oynick =

Mexican swimmer

Tamara Maria Oynick
Personal information
- Born: 28 March 1953 (age 73) Mexico City, Mexico

Sport
- Sport: Swimming
Medal record
Representing Mexico
Central American and Caribbean Games
Gold medal – first place	1966 San Juan	200m breaststroke

Tamara Maria Oynick (born 28 March 1953) is a Mexican former breaststroke and medley swimmer. She competed in four events at the 1968 Summer Olympics.

She competed in the 1965 Maccabiah Games in Israel, winning a silver medal in the 200 m breaststroke behind Israeli Shlomit Nir, a future Olympian.
