= Catie Ball =

American swimmer (born 1951)

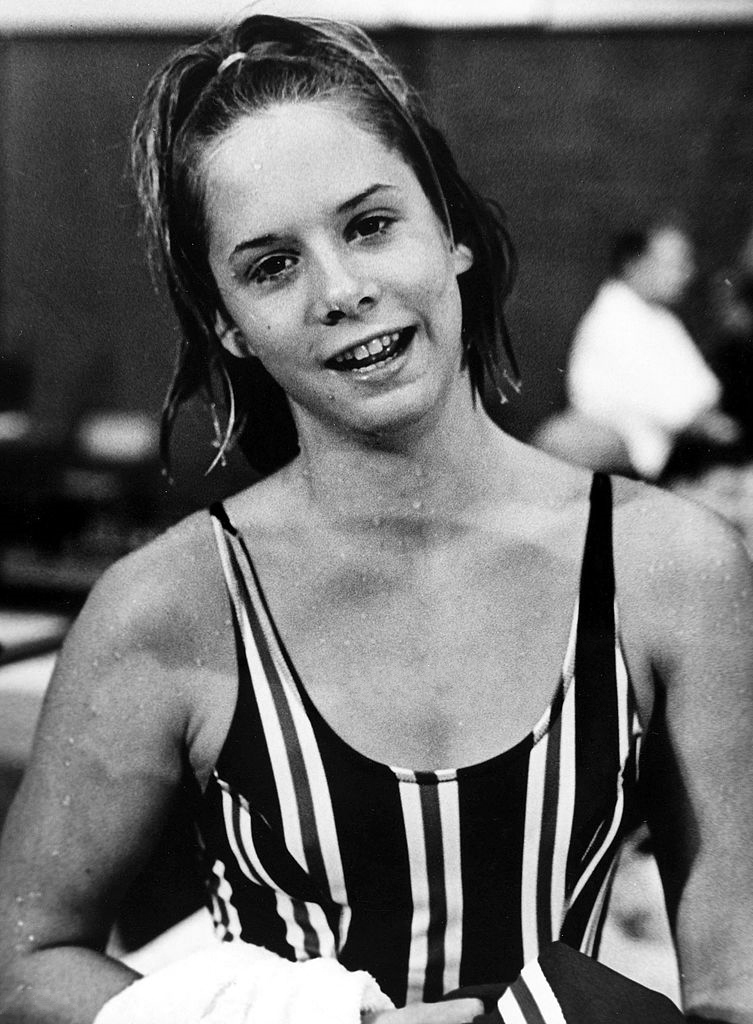
- Ball in 1967

Personal information
- Full name: Catharine Northcutt Ball
- National team: United States
- Born: September 30, 1951 (age 75) Jacksonville, Florida, U.S.
- Height: 5 ft 7 in (1.70 m)
- Weight: 128 lb (58 kg)

Sport
- Sport: Swimming
- Strokes: Breaststroke, medley
- Club: J.E.T.S.
- College team: University of Florida (Head coach)
Medal record
Representing the United States
Olympic Games
Gold medal – first place	1968 Mexico City	4×100 m medley relay
Pan American Games
Gold medal – first place	1967 Winnipeg	100 m breaststroke
Gold medal – first place	1967 Winnipeg	200 m breaststroke
Gold medal – first place	1967 Winnipeg	4×100 m medley relay

Catharine Ball Condon (born Catharine Northcutt Ball on September 30, 1951) is an American former competition swimmer, Olympic champion, and former world record-holder in three events. At the 1968 Summer Olympics, she won a gold medal as a member of the winning U.S. 4×100-meter medley relay team. Ball is a former world record holder in the 100-meter and 200-meter breaststroke events, and is remembered as a teenage star who was the dominant female breaststroke swimmer of her generation.

== Early years ==
Ball was born in Jacksonville, Florida, in 1951. As a teenager, she swam for the J.E.T.S. swim team in Amateur Athletic Union (AAU) competition, the Florida Yacht Club, and attended Robert E. Lee High School in Jacksonville.

In August 1966, she set a new American record of 2:44.8 in the 200-meter breaststroke at the AAU national championships, shattering the previous mark by almost three seconds. In December 1966, she tied the world record of 1:15.7 in the 100-meter breaststroke at the international swim meet at the Hall of Fame pool in Fort Lauderdale, Florida.

While swimming for the Lee High School Generals swim team, she won the 1967 Florida 2A state high school championships in the 200-yard individual medley and the 100-yard breaststroke events, setting Florida state records in both. Her Florida record in the 100-yard breaststroke stood for eleven years.

== International swimming career ==
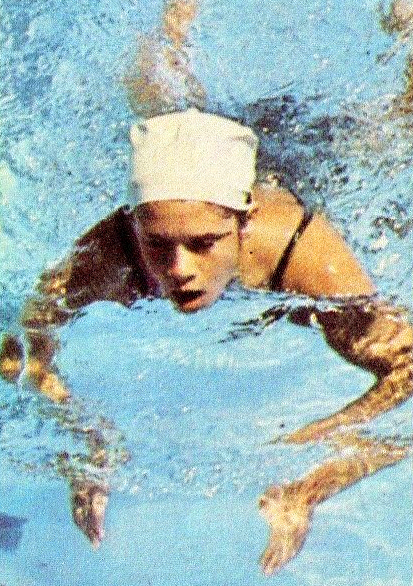
Catie Ball in the 1960s

Ball set a new world record in the 200-meter breaststroke at the Santa Clara invitational swim meet in July 1967. At the 1967 Pan American Games in Winnipeg, Manitoba, Ball won two individual gold medals in the women's 100-meter and 200-meter breaststroke events, and a third in the women's 4×100-meter medley relay in which she swam the breaststroke leg for the winning U.S. team of Kendis Moore, Ball, Ellie Daniel and Wendy Fordyce. In the process, she set new world records in all three events. During 1967, she set world records in all four (two metric, two non-metric) individual breaststroke events as a 15-year-old.

== 1968 Mexico City Olympics ==
Ball was the reigning world record holder in all four breaststroke distances and bettered her own world records in the 100-meter and 200-meter breaststroke at the U.S. Olympic Trials in August 1968.

Despite having to overcome mononucleosis and missing several scheduled meets in early 1968, Ball was the favorite to win three gold medals at the 1968 Olympics. She arrived at the 1968 Summer Olympics in Mexico City, however, with a case of influenza.

She won her only Olympic medal, a gold, as a member of the winning U.S. 4×100-meter medley relay team, alongside Kaye Hall (backstroke), Ellie Daniel (butterfly) and Susan Pedersen (freestyle). In the 100-meter breaststroke final, Ball led close to the finish but physical exhaustion overwhelmed her, and she finished fifth. She was too ill to swim in the subsequent preliminary heats of the 200-meter breaststroke and was scratched from the event.

== College coaching career ==
After the Olympics, Ball received a special scholarship to attend the University of Florida in Gainesville, Florida, but effectively dropped out of competition swimming because there were no women's college swim teams at the time and because of her desire to lead a more "normal" life.

As a senior at the University of Florida, she was hired by athletic director Ray Graves to be the first head coach of the newly organized women's Florida Gators swimming and diving team in Association for Intercollegiate Athletics for Women (AIAW) competition during the 1972–73 school year. In their first year of intercollegiate competition, Ball's Lady Gators swimmers were undefeated in dual meets and placed second at the AIAW national championship during her single-season tenure.

Ball graduated from the University of Florida with a bachelor's degree in education in 1973.

== Life after swimming ==
Ball currently resides in Pensacola, Florida. In the time since retiring from competition swimming at the age of 17, she has been a college swim coach, kindergarten teacher, junior swim coach, housewife and interior decorator. Ball and her business partner have operated a successful interior decorating business, "Beside the Point," for the past decade. She and her husband Tom Condon have three children and two grandchildren.

She was inducted into the International Swimming Hall of Fame in 1976, and the Florida Sports Hall of Fame in 2010.

== World records ==
Women's 100-meter breaststroke

Time	Date	Event	Location
1:16.40	July 15, 1966	Cady Way Pool Summer Invite	Winter Park, Florida
1:15.60	December 28, 1966	ISHOF international swim meet	Fort Lauderdale, Florida
1:14.80	July 31, 1967	Pan American Games	Winnipeg, Manitoba
1:14.60	August 19, 1967	AAU National Outdoor Championships	Philadelphia, Pennsylvania
1:14.20	August 25, 1968	United States Olympic Trials	Los Angeles, California

Women's 200-meter breaststroke

Time	Date	Event	Location
2:40.50	July 9, 1967	Santa Clara Invitational Swim Meet	Santa Clara, California
2:39.50	August 20, 1967	AAU National Outdoor Championships	Philadelphia, Pennsylvania
2:38.50	August 26, 1968	United States Olympic Trials	Los Angeles, California

Women's 4×100-meter medley relay

Time	Date	Event	Location
4:30.00	July 30, 1967	Pan American Games	Winnipeg, Manitoba
4:28.10	September 14, 1968	United States Olympic team exhibition	Colorado Springs, Colorado

Note: All record times and locations are sourced to USA Swimming's list of world records.

== See also ==
- List of Olympic medalists in swimming (women)
- List of University of Florida alumni
- List of University of Florida Olympians
- World record progression 100 metres breaststroke
- World record progression 200 metres breaststroke
- World record progression 4 × 100 metres medley relay

Records
Preceded by Galina Prozumenshchikova	Women's 100-meter breaststroke world record-holder (long course); December 28, 1966 – September 2, 1972	Succeeded by Cathy Carr
Preceded by Galina Prozumenshchikova	Women's 200-meter breaststroke world record-holder (long course); July 9, 1967 – April 7, 1971	Succeeded by Yuliya Bogdanova
