= Víctoria Casas =

Mexican swimmer

Personal information
- Full name: Víctoria Casas

Sport
- Sport: Swimming

Víctoria Casas is a Mexican former swimmer. She competed in two events at the 1968 Summer Olympics.
