= Arlette Wilmes =

Luxembourgish swimmer

Personal information
- Born: 20 May 1950 (age 76) Luxembourg City, Luxembourg

Sport
- Sport: Swimming

Arlette Wilmes (born 20 May 1950) is a Luxembourgish former swimmer. She competed in two events at the 1968 Summer Olympics.
