= Alla Grebennikova =

Russian swimmer (born 1949)

Personal information
- Born: 24 February 1949 (age 77) Moscow, Russia
- Height: 1.78 m (5 ft 10 in)
- Weight: 67 kg (148 lb)

Sport
- Sport: Swimming
- Club: Burevestnik Moscow
Medal record
Women's swimming
Representing Soviet Union
European Championships
Silver medal – second place	1970 Barcelona	200 m breaststroke
Bronze medal – third place	1970 Barcelona	100 m breaststroke
Universiade
Silver medal – second place	1970 Turin	100 m breaststroke
Bronze medal – third place	1970 Turin	200 m breaststroke

Alla Grebennikova (Russian: Алла Гребенникова; born 24 February 1949) is a retired Russian breaststroke swimmer who won two medals at the 1970 European Aquatics Championships. She also competed at the 1968 Summer Olympics and finished fourth in the 4×100 m medley and 200 m breaststroke events.

She married a Bulgarian swimming coach, Georgi Kostadinov (Bulgarian: Георги Костадинов), changed her name to Kostadinova, and moved to Bulgaria. There she worked as a swimming coach and started competing in the masters category. Since around 2000 she returned to Russia (or started sharing time between Russia and Bulgaria) and until 2008 was winning all Russian 200 m breaststroke titles. She finished second at the European (2001) and World championships (2004) in the same event.
