= Svetlana Babanina =

Soviet swimmer (born 1943)

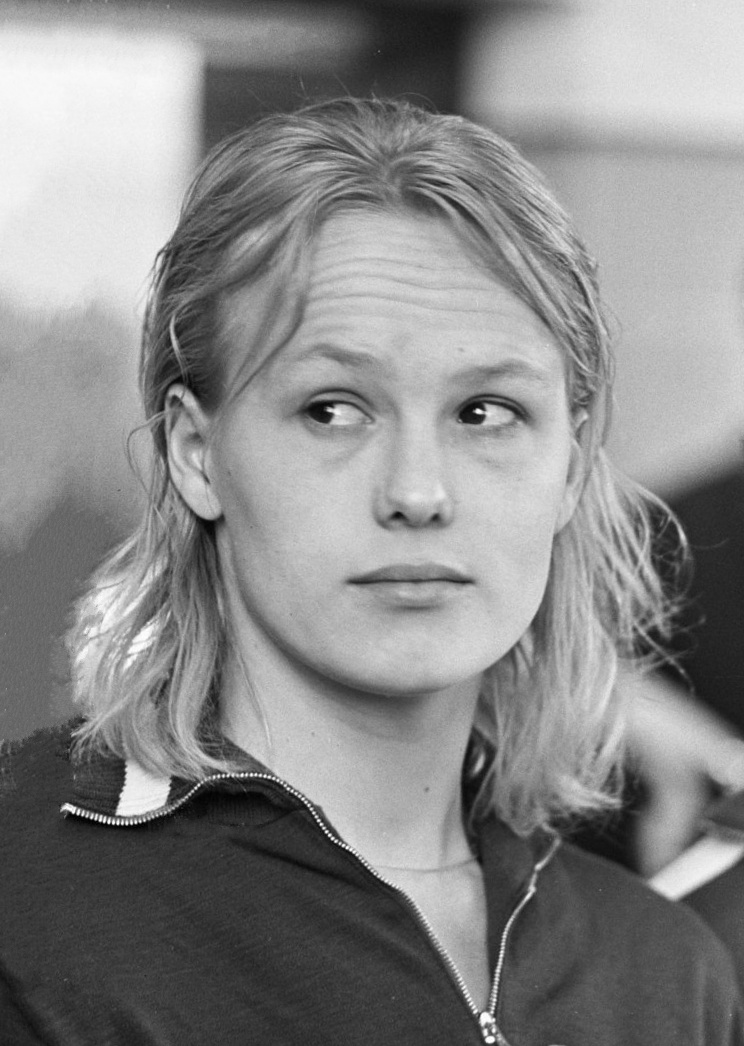
- Svetlana Babanina in 1966

Personal information
- Born: 4 February 1943 (age 83) Tambov, Russian SFSR, Soviet Union
- Height: 1.73 m (5 ft 8 in)
- Weight: 62 kg (137 lb)

Sport
- Sport: Swimming
- Club: Spartak Toshkent
Medal record
Representing the Soviet Union
Olympic Games
Bronze medal – third place	1964 Tokyo	200 m breaststroke
Bronze medal – third place	1964 Tokyo	4×100 m medley
Summer Universiade
Gold medal – first place	1965 Budapest	200 m breaststroke
Bronze medal – third place	1965 Budapest	100 m freestyle

Svetlana Viktorovna Babanina (Russian: Светлана Викторовна Бабанина; born 4 February 1943) is a retired Soviet swimmer who competed at the 1964 and 1968 Summer Olympics. In 1964, she won bronze medals in the 4 × 100 m medley relay and 200 m individual breaststroke, whereas in 1968 she finished in seventh and sixth place in the 100 m and 200 m breaststroke, respectively. Babanina won the 200 m event at the 1965 Universiade; she competed at the European Championships in 1962 and 1966, but did not medal. Domestically she won five titles: in the 400 m individual medley (1962 and 1963), 4 × 100 m freestyle relay (1963) and 100 m and 200 m breaststroke (1964). In 1964–1965 she set two world records in the 100 m breaststroke (1:17.2 in 1964 and 1:16.5 in 1965).

Personal bests:

- 100 m breaststroke – 1:16.5 (1965)
- 200 m breaststroke – 2:47.2 (1964)
- 400 m individual medley – 5:40.5 (1965).
