= Ann O'Connor =

Irish swimmer (born 1952)

Personal information
- Born: 3 June 1952 (age 74) Dublin, Ireland

Sport
- Sport: Swimming

Ann O'Connor (born 3 June 1952) is a female Irish former swimmer.

== Swimming career ==
O'Connor competed at the 1968 Summer Olympics and the 1972 Summer Olympics. At the ASA National British Championships she won the 110 yards breaststroke title in 1969.
