= Tamara Orejuela =

Ecuadorian swimmer

Personal information
- Born: 23 June 1953 (age 73) Guayaquil, Ecuador

Sport
- Sport: Swimming

Tamara Orejuela (born 23 June 1953) is an Ecuadorian former swimmer. She competed in two events at the 1968 Summer Olympics. She was the first woman to represent Ecuador at the Olympics.
