= Alberca Olímpica Francisco Márquez =

Aquatic facility in Mexico City, Mexico

Coordinates: 19°21′33″N 99°9′17″W

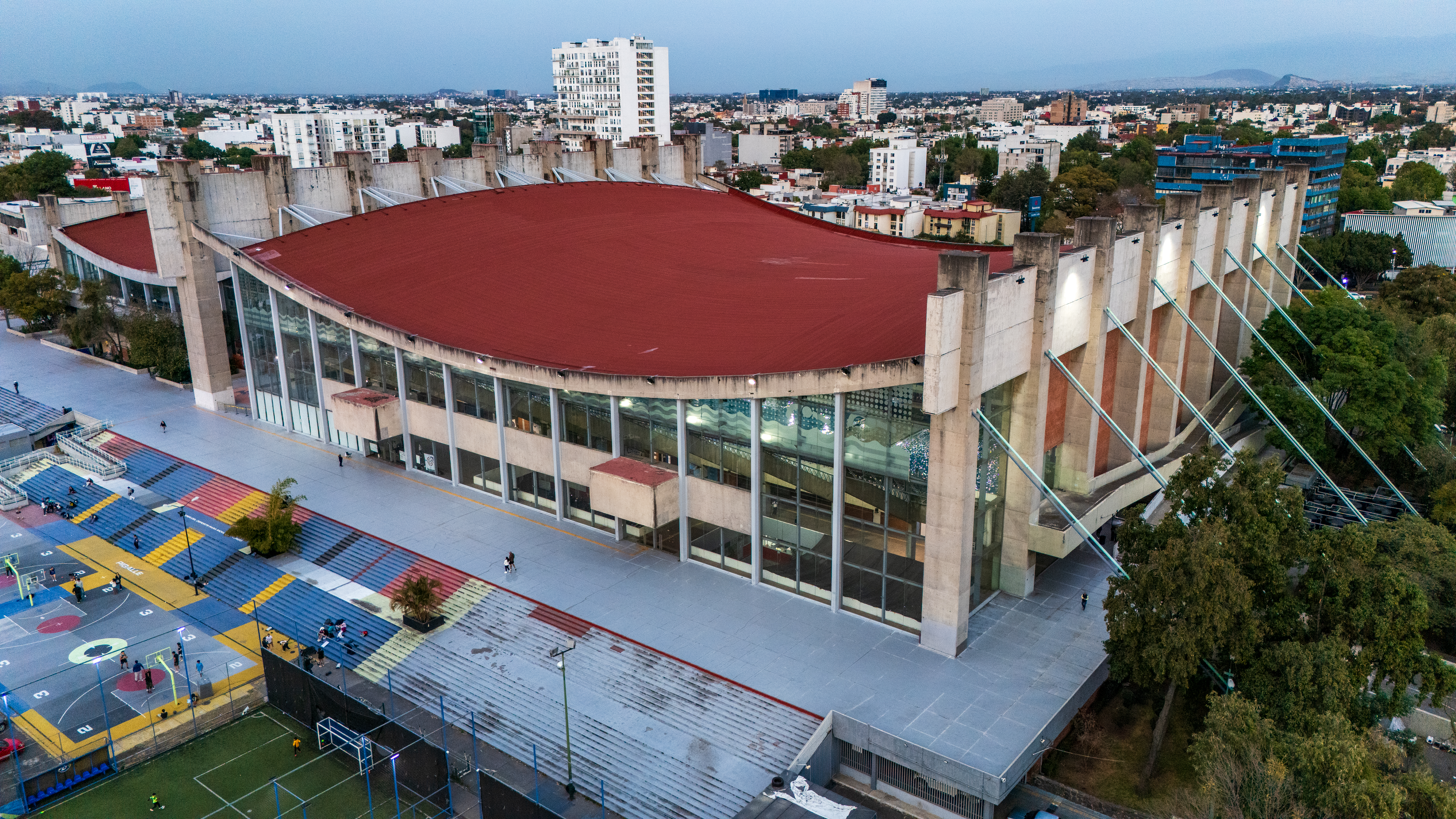
- Interactive map of Alberca Olímpica Francisco Márquez
- Full name: Alberca Olímpica Francisco Márquez
- Address: Mexico City, Mexico
- Capacity: 4,300

The Alberca Olímpica Francisco Márquez is an indoor swimming pool Olympic facility located in Mexico City, Mexico. It has a capacity of 4,300.

It hosted the 1968 Summer Olympics for competitions of swimming, diving, water polo, and the swimming part of modern pentathlon. The only Mexican gold medal in Olympic swimming competitions was won at this site. It was won by Felipe Muñoz in the 200 metres men breast stroke competition.

It also hosted the 2017 World Para Swimming Championships.

== Gallery ==
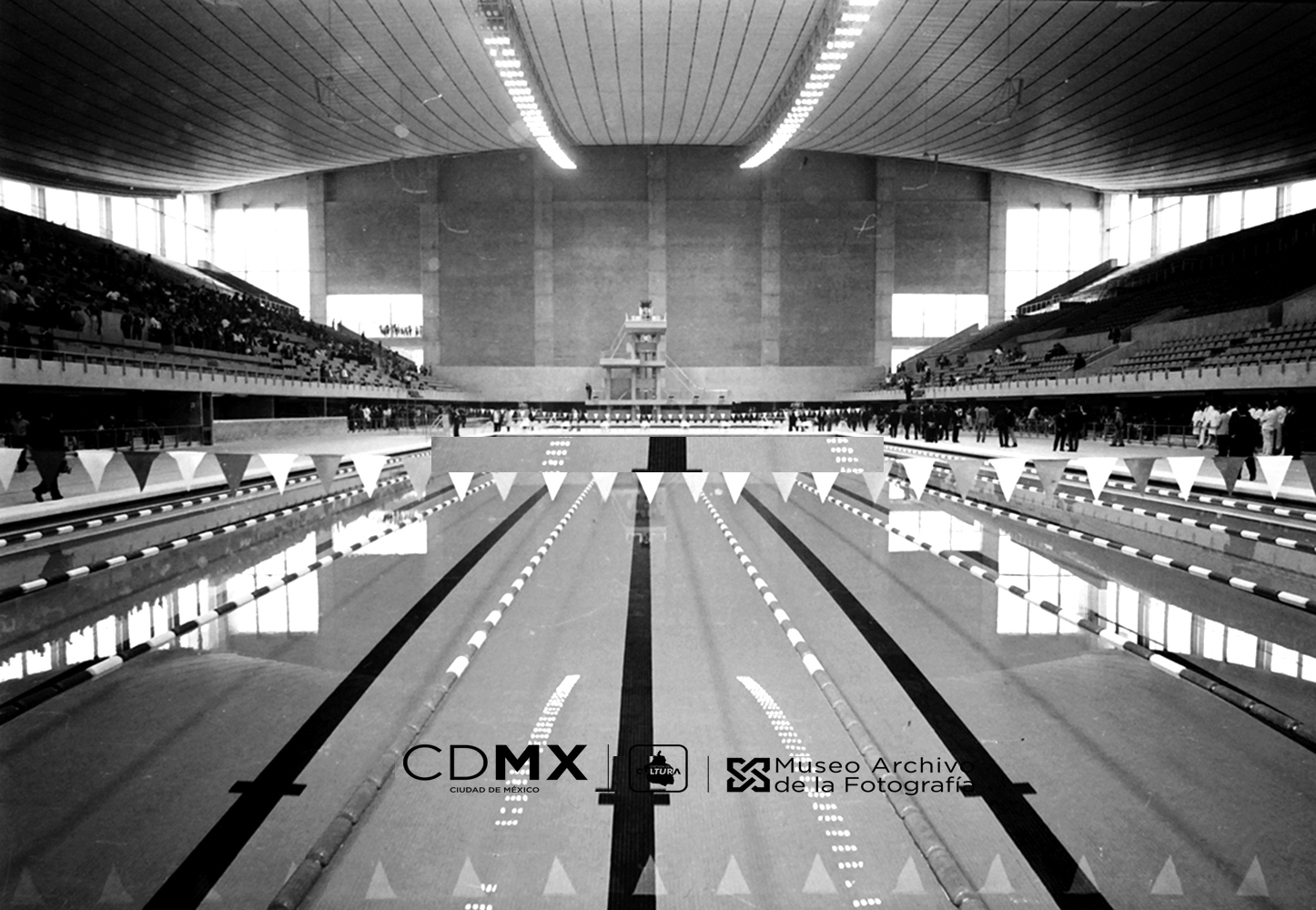
Opening of the pool, September 13, 1968

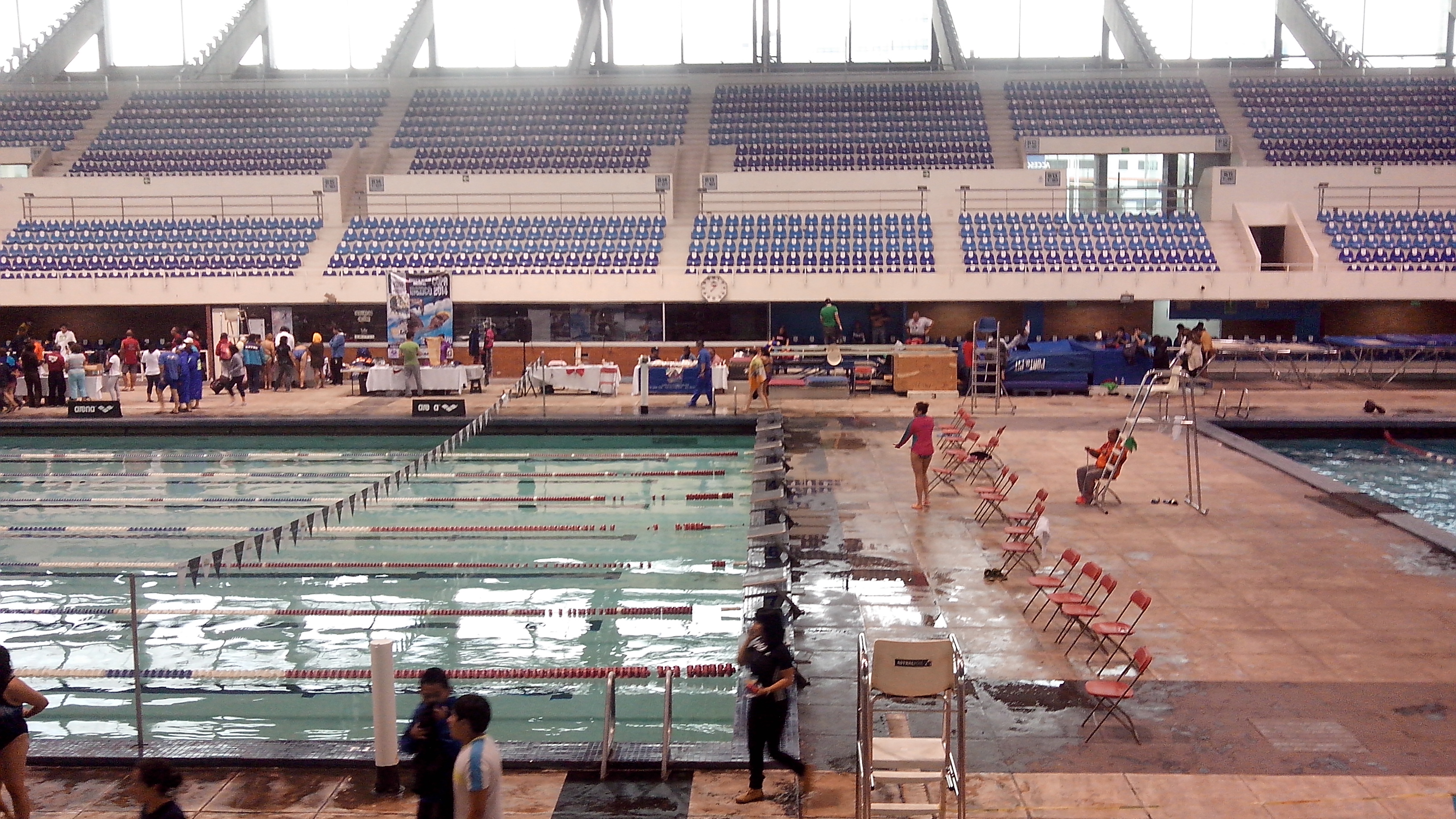
Inside the aquatics center in 2014

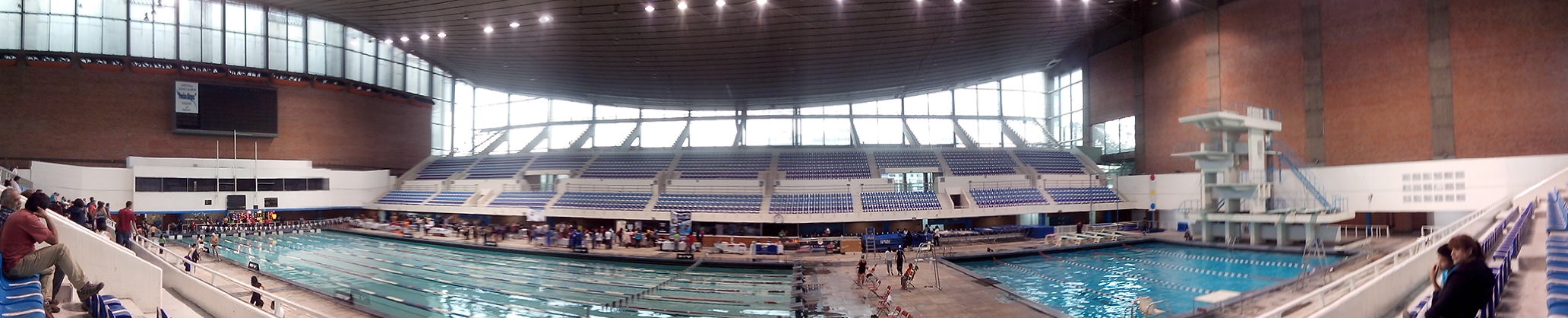
Panorama view of the competition and diving pools

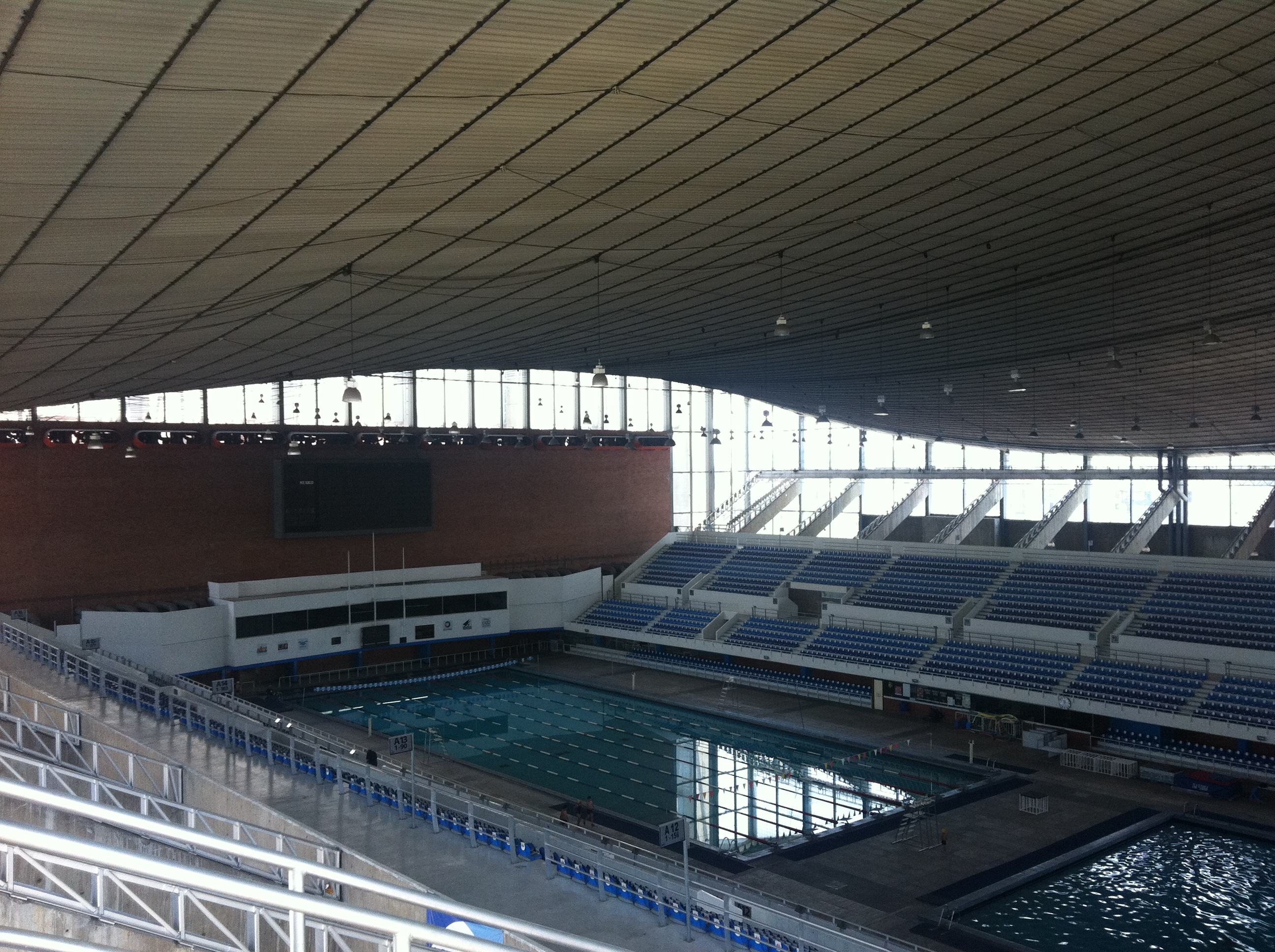
Inside the aquatics center in 2011

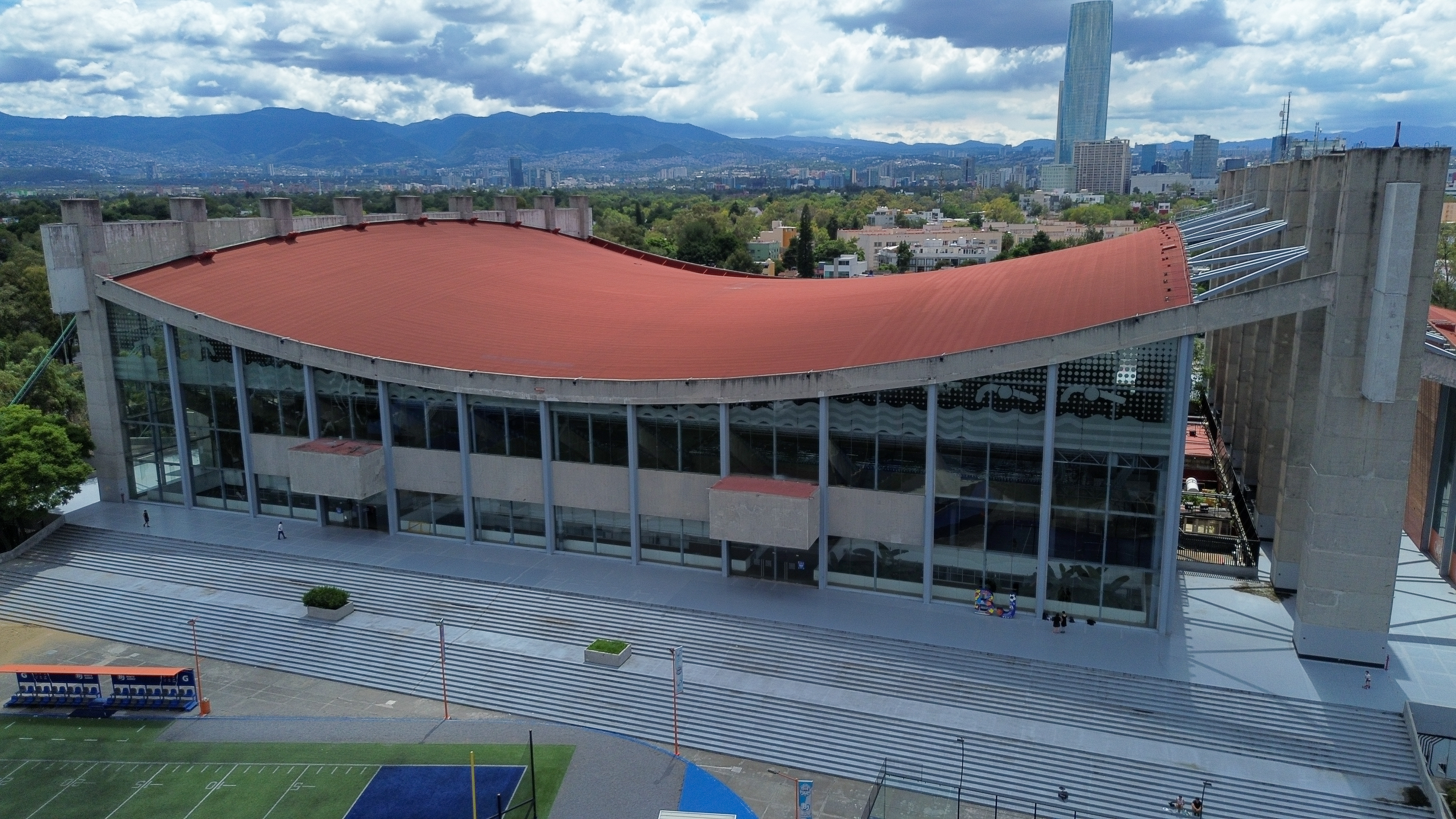
Exterior overview of the aquatics center
