= Ana María Norbis =

Uruguayan swimmer (born 1947)

Personal information
- Born: 15 August 1947 (age 78) Paysandú, Uruguay

Sport
- Sport: Swimming
- Strokes: Breaststroke
Medal record
Representing Uruguay
Pan American Games
Silver medal – second place	1967 Winnipeg	100m breaststroke
Bronze medal – third place	1967 Winnipeg	200m breaststroke
Bronze medal – third place	1967 Winnipeg	4x100m medley relay

Ana María Norbis (born 15 August 1947) is a Uruguayan former swimmer. She competed in three events at the 1968 Summer Olympics.
