= List of Salvadorian Olympians =

El Salvador at the Olympics
- IOC code: ESA
- NOC: El Salvador Olympic Committee
- Website: www.teamesa.org (in Spanish)
- Medals: Gold 0 Silver 0 Bronze 0 Total 0

Summer appearances
- 1968; 1972; 1976–1980; 1984; 1988; 1992; 1996; 2000; 2004; 2008; 2012; 2016; 2020; 2024

El Salvador first competed in the Olympic Games at the 1968 Summer Olympics in Mexico City, Mexico. No athletes were sent to the 1976 Summer Olympics, and the nation took part in the boycott of the 1980 Summer Olympics. Excluding these two Games, El Salvador has participated in every Summer Olympic Games since 1968. It has never competed in the Olympic Winter Games. As of the completion of the 2012 Summer Olympics, 118 Salvadorans (93 male and 25 female) have represented their nation at the Olympics. No Salvadoran has ever won an Olympic medal.

Both the all-time youngest and oldest Olympic participants from El Salvador competed at the 1968 Games. Swimmer Rubén Guerrero (13 years, 351 days) swam in five events: the Men's 400 meters freestyle, 1,500 meters freestyle, 4 × 100 meters freestyle relay, 100 meters butterfly, and 200 meters individual medley. Roberto Soundy (68 years, 229 days) finished 54th in the trap shooting event.

Fourteen athletes have competed in multiple Olympics. Eva Dimas, Evelyn García, and Juan Vargas, are the only Salvadorans to have competed in three Olympic Games. Andrés Amador, Kriscia García, Maureen Kaila Vergara, Luisa Maida, Gustavo Manzur, Golda Marcus, Francisco Suriano, Fredy Torres, Juan Antonio Valencia, Camila Vargas, and Salvador Vilanova have each competed in two Olympic Games.

== Athletes ==
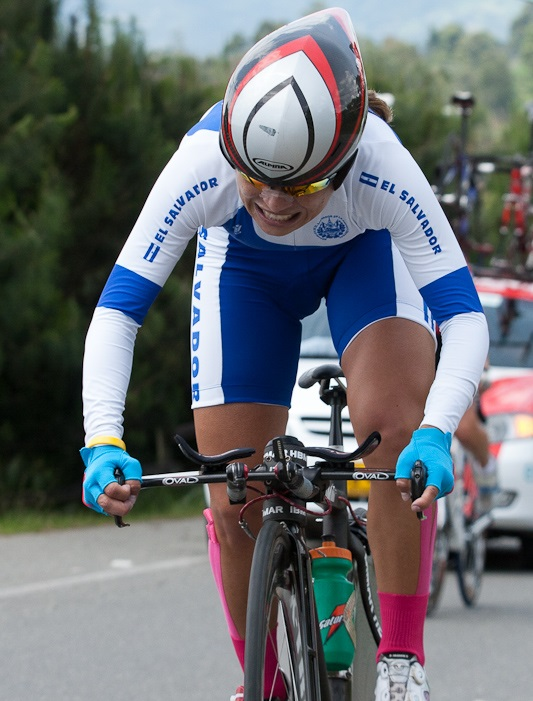
Evelyn García, three-time Olympic cycle racer from El Salvador (2004, 2008, and 2012)

Name	Gender	Olympic Games	Sport	Ref
Ángel Acevedo	Male	1968 Mexico City	Football	
Mario Aguilar	Male	1968 Mexico City	Sailing	
Rafael Alfaro	Male	2012 London	Swimming	
José Alvarado	Male	1968 Mexico City	Swimming	
Andrés Amador	Male	1968 Mexico City, 1972 Munich	Shooting	
José Manuel Angel	Male	1968 Mexico City	Football	
Rafael Arévalo	Male	2008 Beijing	Tennis	
José Astacio	Male	1968 Mexico City	Athletics	
Frank Avelar	Male	1988 Seoul	Boxing	
Víctor Azúcar	Male	1968 Mexico City	Football	
Pamela Benítez	Female	2012 London	Swimming	
Rubén Benítez	Male	1996 Atlanta	Athletics	
Mauricio Bolaños	Male	1968 Mexico City	Cycling	
Alejandro Cabrera	Male	1972 Munich	Swimming	
Francisco Cáceres	Male	1996 Atlanta	Weightlifting	
Luis Campos	Male	1984 Los Angeles	Athletics	
Arturo Carranza	Male	1968 Mexico City	Swimming	
Roberto Castellanos	Male	1968 Mexico City	Athletics	
Tito Castillo	Male	1968 Mexico City	Shooting	
Guillermo Castro	Male	1968 Mexico City	Football	
Helio Castro	Male	1968 Mexico City	Shooting	
María Castro	Female	1968 Mexico City	Swimming	
Franklin Cisneros	Male	2008 Beijing	Judo	
Verónica Colindres	Female	2008 Beijing	Athletics	
Mario Contreras	Male	2008 Beijing	Cycling	
Efraín Cordero	Male	1968 Mexico City	Athletics	
Ricardo Cruz	Male	1968 Mexico City	Athletics	
Alfredo Cubías	Male	1968 Mexico City	Athletics	
Eva Dimas	Female	2000 Sydney, 2004 Athens, 2008 Beijing	Weightlifting	
Ernesto Durón	Male	1968 Mexico City	Swimming	
Manuel Escobar	Male	1968 Mexico City	Sailing	
Juan Fernández	Male	1968 Mexico City	Football	
Antonio Ferracuti	Male	1972 Munich	Swimming	
Carmen Ferracuti	Female	1968 Mexico City	Swimming	
Donatella Ferracuti	Female	1968 Mexico City	Swimming	
Piero Ferracuti	Male	1972 Munich	Swimming	
Carlos Figueroa	Male	2012 London	Judo	
Salvador Flamenco	Male	1968 Mexico City	Football	
Mario Flores	Male	1968 Mexico City	Football	
Valerio Fontanals	Male	1968 Mexico City	Weightlifting	
Arely Franco	Female	1996 Atlanta	Athletics	
Takeshi Fujiwara	Male	2004 Athens	Athletics	
Francisco Funes	Male	1968 Mexico City	Cycling	
Evelyn García	Female	2004 Athens, 2008 Beijing, 2012 London	Cycling	
Kriscia García	Female	1984 Los Angeles, 1988 Seoul	Athletics	
Roberto García	Male	1968 Mexico City	Cycling	
Julio González	Male	1984 Los Angeles	Shooting	
Mauricio González	Male	1968 Mexico City	Football	
Rubén Guerrero	Male	1968 Mexico City	Swimming	
Carlos Hasbún	Male	1968 Mexico City	Athletics	
Rosa Hasbún	Female	1968 Mexico City	Swimming	
Sergio Hasbún	Male	1972 Munich	Swimming	
Emerson Hernández	Male	2012 London	Athletics	
Angelo Iannuzzelli	Male	1992 Barcelona	Athletics	
Celia Jokisch	Female	1968 Mexico City	Swimming	
Friedrich Jokisch	Male	1968 Mexico City	Swimming	
Mauricio Jubis	Male	1968 Mexico City	Athletics	
Gladys Landaverde	Female	2012 London	Athletics	
René López	Male	1984 Los Angeles	Athletics	
Roberto López	Male	2012 London	Rowing	
Luisa Maida	Female	2000 Sydney, 2008 Beijing	Shooting	
Gustavo Manzur	Male	1984 Los Angeles, 1988 Seoul	Wrestling	
Golda Marcus	Female	2004 Athens, 2008 Beijing	Swimming	
María José Marenco	Female	1992 Barcelona	Swimming	
Alex Martínez	Male	1968 Mexico City	Weightlifting	
Donald Martínez	Male	1988 Seoul	Boxing	
Ivis Martínez	Female	2000 Sydney	Athletics	
Juan Ramón Martínez	Male	1968 Mexico City	Football	
Ricardo Martínez	Male	1968 Mexico City	Football	
Rosario Martínez	Female	1968 Mexico City	Athletics	
Íngrid Medrano	Female	2008 Beijing	Wrestling	
Santiago Mellado	Male	1988 Seoul	Athletics	
Sergio Méndez	Male	1968 Mexico City	Football	
Ricardo Menéndez	Male	1968 Mexico City	Shooting	
Cristóbal Merlos	Male	2000 Sydney	Archery	
Ricardo Merlos	Male	2004 Athens	Archery	
Melissa Mikec	Female	2012 London	Shooting	
Salvador Mira	Male	2008 Beijing	Athletics	
David Miranda	Male	1968 Mexico City	Cycling	
Juan Miranda	Male	1984 Los Angeles	Swimming	
Juan Molina	Male	1968 Mexico City	Cycling	
Edgar Morales	Male	1968 Mexico City	Football	
Miguel Angel Moreno	Male	2000 Sydney	Judo	
María Moreño	Female	1968 Mexico City	Swimming	
Abel Muñoz	Male	1968 Mexico City	Swimming	
Reynaldo Patiño	Male	1972 Munich	Swimming	
Rubén Piñeda	Male	1996 Atlanta	Swimming	
José Quintanilla	Male	1968 Mexico City	Football	
Carlos Ramírez	Male	1996 Atlanta	Judo	
Eduardo Ramos	Male	1968 Mexico City	Swimming	
Tomás Rengifo	Male	1972 Munich	Swimming	
Patricia Rivas	Female	2004 Athens	Shooting	
Roberto Rivas	Male	1968 Mexico City	Football	
Herbert Rodríguez	Male	1992 Barcelona	Athletics	
Mauricio Rodríguez	Male	1968 Mexico City	Football	
José Luis Rosales	Male	1972 Munich	Shooting	
José Ruano	Male	1968 Mexico City	Football	
Carlos Ruíz	Male	1968 Mexico City	Sailing	
Julio César Salamanca	Male	2012 London	Weightlifting	
Aldo Salandra	Male	1984 Los Angeles	Athletics	
Salvador Salguero	Male	1984 Los Angeles	Swimming	
Rafael Santos	Male	1968 Mexico City	Athletics	
Tony Serpas	Male	2000 Sydney	Athletics	
Cecilia Sosa	Female	1968 Mexico City	Athletics	
Ricardo Soundy	Male	1968 Mexico City	Shooting	
Roberto Soundy	Male	1968 Mexico City	Shooting	
Francisco Suriano	Male	1996 Atlanta, 2000 Sydney	Swimming	
Fredy Torres	Male	1984 Los Angeles, 1988 Seoul	Judo	
José Mario Váldez	Male	1972 Munich	Shooting	
Juan Antonio Valencia	Male	1968 Mexico City, 1972 Munich	Shooting	
Camila Vargas	Female	2008 Beijing, 2012 London	Rowing	
Juan Vargas	Male	1984 Los Angeles, 1992 Barcelona, 1996 Atlanta	Judo	
Jorge Vásquez	Male	1968 Mexico City	Football	
Maureen Kaila Vergara	Female	1996 Atlanta, 2000 Sydney	Cycling	
Salvador Vilanova	Male	1968 Mexico City, 1972 Munich	Swimming	
Tomás Vilanova	Male	1968 Mexico City	Shooting	
Alberto Villalta	Male	1968 Mexico City	Football	
Elizabeth Zaragoza	Female	2004 Athens	Athletics	

== See also ==
- El Salvador at the Olympics
