= El Salvador at the 1968 Summer Olympics =

- IOC code: ESA (SAL used at these Games)
- NOC: El Salvador Olympic Committee

in Mexico City
- Competitors: 60 (52 men and 8 women) in 7 sports
- Flag bearer: Salvador Vilanova
- Medals: Gold 0 Silver 0 Bronze 0 Total 0

Summer Olympics appearances (overview)
- 1968; 1972; 1976–1980; 1984; 1988; 1992; 1996; 2000; 2004; 2008; 2012; 2016; 2020; 2024

El Salvador competed in the Olympic Games for the first time at the 1968 Summer Olympics in Mexico City, Mexico, from 12 to 27 October 1968.

Comité Olímpico de El Salvador sent a total of 60 athletes to the Games, 52 men and 8 women, to compete in 7 sports. Swimmer Salvador Vilanova was selected to carry his nation's flag during the opening ceremony.

== Competitors ==
Comité Olímpico de El Salvador selected a team of 60 athletes, 52 men and 8 women, to compete in 7 sports. The contingent marks the largest in El Salvador's Olympic participation. Trap shooter Roberto Soundy, at age 68, was the oldest athlete of the team, while swimmer Rubén Guerrero was the youngest at age 13. Each respectively holds the distinction of being the all-time oldest and youngest Olympic participants from El Salvador.

The following is the list of number of competitors participating in the Games.

Sport	Men	Women	Total
Athletics	8	2	10
Cycling	5	0	5
Football	18	0	18
Sailing	3	0	3
Shooting	8	0	8
Swimming	8	6	14
Weightlifting	2	0	2
Total	52	8	60

== Athletics ==
Men
Track & road events

Athlete	Event	Heat		Quarterfinal		Semifinal		Final	
Athlete	Event	Result	Rank	Result	Rank	Result	Rank	Result	Rank
Rafael Santos	100 m	11.22	8	Did not advance					
José Astacio	200 m	23.13	6	Did not advance					
José Astacio	400 m	52.9	7	Did not advance					
Alfredo Cubías	800 m	2:08.7	8	—N/a		Did not advance			
Alfredo Cubías	1500m	4:32.58	10	—N/a		Did not advance			
Efraín Cordero	3000 m steeplechase	11:19.23	13	—N/a				Did not advance	
Roberto Castellanos	20 km walk	—N/a						1:58:48.0	29
Ricardo Cruz	50 km walk	—N/a						5:56:22.0	28

Field events

Athlete	Event	Qualification		Final	
Athlete	Event	Distance	Position	Distance	Position
Mauricio Jubis	Shot put	12.92	19	Did not advance	
Mauricio Jubis	Discus throw	36.18	27	Did not advance	
Carlos Hasbún	Hammer throw	37.46	22	Did not advance	

Women
Track & road events

Athlete	Event	Heat		Quarterfinal		Semifinal		Final	
Athlete	Event	Result	Rank	Result	Rank	Result	Rank	Result	Rank
Cecilia Sosa	100 m	13.7	7	Did not advance					
Cecilia Sosa	80 m hurdles	12.8	6	—N/a		Did not advance			

Field events

Athlete	Event	Qualification		Final	
Athlete	Event	Distance	Position	Distance	Position
Cecilia Sosa	Long jump	NM	—N/a	Did not advance	
Rosario Martínez	Shot put	—N/a		10.18	14

== Cycling ==
=== Road ===
Men

Athlete	Event	Time	Rank
Mauricio Bolaños	Road race	DNF	AC
Francisco Funes	Road race	DNF	AC
David Miranda	Road race	DNF	AC
Juan Molina	Road race	DNF	AC
Mauricio Bolaños	Team time trial	2:39:38.39	24
Francisco Funes	Team time trial	2:39:38.39	24
Roberto García	Team time trial	2:39:38.39	24
Juan Molina	Team time trial	2:39:38.39	24

== Football ==
Men
Team roster

Head coach: Rigoberto Guzmán

No.	Pos.	Player	DoB	Age	Caps	Club	Tournament games	Tournament goals	Minutes played	Sub off	Sub on	Cards yellow/red
1	GK	Ricardo Martínez	Oct 28, 1947	20	?	(El Salvador) Águila	1	0	55	1	0	0
2	DF	Roberto Rivas	Jul 17, 1941	27	?	(El Salvador) Alianza	3	0	270	0	0	0
3	DF	Guillermo Castro	Jun 25, 1940	28	?	(El Salvador) Atlético Marte	2	0	180	0	0	0
4	DF	Edgar Morales	Apr 17, 1940	28	?	(El Salvador) Atlético Marte	1	0	90	0	0	0
5	DF	Jorge Vásquez	Apr 23, 1945	23	?	(El Salvador) Universidad	3	0	270	0	0	0
6	DF	José Ruano	Sep 30, 1945	22	?	(El Salvador) FAS	2	0	155	1	0	0
7	FW	Salvador Cabezas	Feb 28, 1947	21	?	(El Salvador) Adler	2	0	162	1	0	0
8	DF	Alberto Villalta	Nov 19, 1947	20	?	(El Salvador) Atlético Marte	2	0	157	0	0	(red card) 1
9	MD	José Quintanilla	Oct 29, 1947	20	?	(El Salvador) Atlético Marte	3	0	270	0	0	0
10	FW	Mauricio Rodríguez	Dec 12, 1945	22	?	(El Salvador) Universidad	3	1	255	1	0	0
11	FW	Elmer Acevedo	Feb 24, 1946	22	?	(El Salvador) FAS	1	0	90	0	0	0
12	MD	Mario Flores	Sep 12, 1943	24	?	(El Salvador) FAS	1	0	32	1	0	(yellow card) 1
13	FW	Mauricio González	Sep 19, 1945	22	?	(El Salvador) Atlético Marte	3	0	270	0	0	0
14	MF	Juan Ramón Martínez	Apr 20, 1948	20	?	(El Salvador) Águila	3	1	151	1	2	(yellow card) 1
15	FW	Víctor Azucar	Sep 20, 1946	22	?	(El Salvador) Adler	2	0	30	0	2	0
16	MD	Sergio Méndez	Feb 14, 1942	26	?	(El Salvador) Atlético Marte	3	0	270	0	0	0
17	MD	José Manuel Angel	Aug 24, 1948	20	?	(El Salvador) Alianza	1	0	25	0	1	0
18	GK	Joaquin Alabi			?	(El Salvador) FAS	0	0	0	0	0	0
19	GK	Gualberto Fernández	Jul 12, 1941	27	?	(El Salvador) Atlante	3	0	215	0	1	0

Group play

Team	Pld	W	D	L	GF	GA	GD	Pts
Hungary	3	2	1	0	8	2	+6	5
Israel	3	2	0	1	8	6	+2	4
Ghana	3	0	2	1	6	8	−2	2
El Salvador	3	0	1	2	2	8	−6	1

1968-10-13
12:00

Israel	5 – 3	Ghana
Spiegel 11' 75'; Feigenbaum 16' 30' 70'	Report	Jabir 18' 79'; Amosa 35'

Estadio Nou Camp, León
Referee: Michel Kitabdjian (France)

1968-10-13
12:00

Hungary	4 – 0	El Salvador
Menczel 19'; A. Dunai 47'; Fazekas 51'; Sárközi 68'	Report

Estadio Jalisco, Guadalajara
Referee: Diego De Leo (Mexico)

1968-10-15
12:00

Hungary	2 – 2	Ghana
A. Dunai 15'; Menczel 17'	Report	Sunday 12'; Sampene 33'

Estadio Jalisco, Guadalajara
Referee: Yoshiyuki Maruyama (Japan)

1968-10-15
12:00

Israel	3 – 1	El Salvador
Talbi 20'; Spiegler 44'; Bar 85'	Report	Martínez 35'

Estadio Nou Camp, León
Referee: Thompson Shakibudeen Badru (Nigeria)

1968-10-17
12:00

El Salvador	1 – 1	Ghana
Rodríguez 42'	Report	Kofi 55'

Estadio Nou Camp, León
Referee: Mariano Medina Iglesias (Spain)

1968-10-17
12:00

Hungary	2 – 0	Israel
A. Dunai 40' 75'	Report

Estadio Jalisco, Guadalajara
Referee: Arturo Yamasaki (Peru)

El Salvador did not advance to the quarterfinal.

== Sailing ==
Men

Athlete	Event	Race							Net points	Final rank
Athlete	Event	1	2	3	4	5	6	7	Net points	Final rank
Carlos Ruiz	Finn	37	35	36	39	~~42~~	30	35	212	34
Mario Aguilar; Manuel Escobar	Flying Dutchman	31	~~36~~	36	36	35	33	35	206	30

== Shooting ==
Eight shooters represented El Salvador in 1968.

Men

Athlete	Event	Final	
Athlete	Event	Score	Rank
Helio Castro	50 m rifle (3 positions)	1046	59
Juan Antonio Valencia	50 m rifle (3 positions)	1013	62
Ricardo Menéndez	50 m rifle (prone)	578	71
Tomás Vilanova	50 m rifle (prone)	581	74
Tito Castillo	50 m pistol	519	58
Helio Castro	50 m rapid-fire pistol	533	55
Tomás Vilanova	50 m rapid-fire pistol	561	49
Roberto Soundy	Trap	125	54
Andrés Amador	Skeet	175	43
Ricardo Soundy	Skeet	147	50

== Swimming ==
Men

Athlete	Event	Heat		Semifinal		Final	
Athlete	Event	Result	Rank	Result	Rank	Result	Rank
José Alvarado	100 m freestyle	1:02.0	8	Did not advance			
Ernesto Durón	100 m freestyle	1:03.8	8	Did not advance			
Salvador Vilanova	100 m freestyle	59.6	8	Did not advance			
José Alvarado	200 m freestyle	2:20.2	8	—N/a		Did not advance	
Ernesto Durón	200 m freestyle	2:24.1	5	—N/a		Did not advance	
Salvador Vilanova	200 m freestyle	2:14.6	6	—N/a		Did not advance	
Rubén Guerrero	400 m freestyle	4:50.8	6	—N/a		Did not advance	
Friedrich Jokisch	400 m freestyle	5:09.2	5	—N/a		Did not advance	
Rubén Guerrero	1500 m freestyle	19:36.4	6	—N/a		Did not advance	
Arturo Carranza	100 m backstroke	1:17.4	6	Did not advance			
Friedrich Jokisch	100 m backstroke	1:13.7	5	Did not advance			
Arturo Carranza	100 m breaststroke	1:28.0	7	Did not advance			
Abel Muñoz	100 m breaststroke	1:19.4	6	Did not advance			
Eduardo Ramos	100 m breaststroke	1:31.2	6	Did not advance			
Arturo Carranza	200 m breaststroke	3:02.8	8	—N/a		Did not advance	
Rubén Guerrero	100 m butterfly	1:10.1	7	Did not advance			
Friedrich Jokisch	100 m butterfly	1:10.5	7	Did not advance			
Salvador Vilanova	100 m butterfly	59.6	8	Did not advance			
Arturo Carranza	200 m butterfly	2:47.3	6	—N/a		Did not advance	
Rubén Guerrero	200 m individual medley	2:37.5	8	—N/a		Did not advance	
Friedrich Jokisch	200 m individual medley	2:41.6	7	—N/a		Did not advance	
Salvador Vilanova	200 m individual medley	2:33.8	6	—N/a		Did not advance	
José Alvarado; Ernesto Durón; Rubén Guerrero; Salvador Vilanova	4 × 100 m freestyle relay	4:08.3	8	—N/a		Did not advance	

Women

Athlete	Event	Heat		Semifinal		Final	
Athlete	Event	Result	Rank	Result	Rank	Result	Rank
Carmen Ferracuti	100 m freestyle	1:08.5	5	Did not advance			
Rosa Hasbún	100 m freestyle	1:10.0	8	Did not advance			
Donatella Ferracuti	200 m freestyle	2:28.2	6	—N/a		Did not advance	
Carmen Ferracuti	100 m backstroke	1:17.8	6	Did not advance			
Rosa Hasbún	100 m backstroke	1:20.5	7	Did not advance			
Carmen Ferracuti	200 m backstroke	2:52.6	6	—N/a		Did not advance	
Rosa Hasbún	200 m backstroke	2:56.2	8	—N/a		Did not advance	
María Castro	100 m breastroke	1:36.9	7	Did not advance			
Celia Jokisch	100 m breastroke	1:46.6	7	Did not advance			
María Moreño	100 m breastroke	1:27.2	6	Did not advance			
María Castro	200 m breastroke	3:15.4	7	—N/a		Did not advance	
Carmen Ferracuti	200 m individual medley	2:44.7	6	—N/a		Did not advance	
Donatella Ferracuti	200 m individual medley	2:48.6	6	—N/a		Did not advance	
María Moreño	200 m individual medley	2:51.1	7	—N/a		Did not advance	
Carmen Ferracuti; Donatella Ferracuti; Rosa Hasbún; María Moreño	4 × 100 m freestyle relay	4:39.8	5	—N/a		Did not advance	
Carmen Ferracuti; Donatella Ferracuti; Rosa Hasbún; María Moreño	4 × 100 m medley relay	5:12.6	8	—N/a		Did not advance	

== Weightlifting ==
Men

Athlete	Event	Military Press		Snatch		Clean & jerk		Total	Rank
Athlete	Event	Result	Rank	Result	Rank	Result	Rank	Total	Rank
Alex Martínez	56 kg	87.5	14	80.0	14	100.0	13	267.5	13
Valerio Fontanals	67.5 kg	90.0	19	95.0	=18	Did not attempt		185.0	AC
