= Swimming at the 1968 Summer Olympics – Men's 100 metre breaststroke =

Men's 100 metre breaststroke at the Games of the XIX Olympiad
- Venue: Alberca Olímpica Francisco Márquez
- Dates: 18 October 1968 (heats & semifinals); 19 October 1968 (final)
- Competitors: 39 from 24 nations
- Winning time: 1:07.7 OR

Medalists
1st place, gold medalist(s)		Don McKenzie	United States
2nd place, silver medalist(s)		Vladimir Kosinsky	Soviet Union
3rd place, bronze medalist(s)		Nikolai Pankin	Soviet Union

The men's 100 metre breaststroke event at the 1968 Summer Olympics took place between 18 and 19 October in the Alberca Olímpica Francisco Márquez. This swimming event used the breaststroke. Because an Olympic size swimming pool is 50 metres long, this race consisted of two lengths of the pool.

== Results ==
=== Heats ===
Heat 1

Rank	Athlete	Country	Time	Note
1	Nikolay Pankin	Soviet Union	1:08.9	
2	Klaus Katzur	East Germany	1:09.4	
3	Dave Perkowski	United States	1:09.5	
4	Michael Günther	West Germany	1:10.3	
5	Osamu Tsurumine	Japan	1:10.5	
6	Nicolas Gilliard	Switzerland	1:12.8	
7	Eduardo Moreno	Mexico	1:13.7	

Heat 2

Rank	Athlete	Country	Time	Note
1	Nobutaka Taguchi	Japan	1:09.8	
2	Vladimir Kosinsky	Soviet Union	1:10.0	
3	Ken Merten	United States	1:10.6	
4	Liam Ball	Ireland	1:12.1	
5	Leiknir Jónsson	Iceland	1:16.3	
6	Abel Muñoz	El Salvador	1:19.4	

Heat 3

Rank	Athlete	Country	Time	Note
1	Egon Henninger	East Germany	1:09.6	
2	Ladislau Koszta	Romania	1:10.1	
3	Józef Klukowski	Poland	1:11.0	
4	Thomas Aretz	West Germany	1:11.1	
5	Sándor Szabó	Hungary	1:11.3	
6	Stuart Roberts	Great Britain	1:12.7	
7	Ivan Gomina	Colombia	1:15.1	

Heat 4

Rank	Athlete	Country	Time	Note
1	José Sylvio Fiolo	Brazil	1:09.5	
2	Gregor Betz	West Germany	1:10.3	
3	Amman Jalmaani	Philippines	1:10.6	
4	Slavko Kurbanović	Yugoslavia	1:11.6	
5	Roger Roberts	Great Britain	1:11.7	
6	Leroy Goff	Philippines	1:13.7	
7	Arturo Carranza	El Salvador	1:28.0	

Heat 5

Rank	Athlete	Country	Time	Note
1	Don McKenzie	United States	1:08.1	
2	Yevhen Mykhailov	Soviet Union	1:09.3	
3	Bill Mahony	Canada	1:09.7	
4	Osvaldo Boretto	Argentina	1:10.3	
5	Felipe Muñoz	Mexico	1:10.6	
6	Yohan Kende	Israel	1:12.3	

Heat 6

Rank	Athlete	Country	Time	Note
1	Ian O'Brien	Australia	1:08.9	
2	Alberto Forelli	Argentina	1:09.3	
3	Thomas Johnsson	Sweden	1:10.0	
4	José Durán	Spain	1:12.3	
5	Javier Jiménez	Mexico	1:16.3	
6	Eduardo Ramos	El Salvador	1:31.2	

=== Semifinals ===
==== Heat One ====
Rank	Athlete	Country	Time	Notes
1	Egon Henninger	East Germany	1:08.9	
2	Ian O'Brien	Australia	1:09.0	
3	Michael Günther	West Germany	1:09.7	
4	Klaus Katzur	East Germany	1:09.9	
5	Osamu Tsurumine	Japan	1:10.3	
6	Amman Jalmaani	Philippines	1:10.4	
7	Thomas Johnsson	Sweden	1:10.9	
8	Sándor Szabó	Hungary	1:11.1	

==== Heat Two ====
Rank	Athlete	Country	Time	Notes
1	Nikolay Pankin	Soviet Union	1:08.1	
2	Alberto Forelli	Argentina	1:08.9	
3	Dave Perkowski	United States	1:09.0	
4	Felipe Muñoz	Mexico	1:09.4	
5	Ladislau Koszta	Romania	1:09.8	
6	Thomas Aretz	West Germany	1:11.2	
7	Osvaldo Boretto	Argentina	1:11.8	
8	Nobutaka Taguchi	Japan		DQ

==== Heat Three ====
Rank	Athlete	Country	Time	Notes
1	Vladimir Kosinsky	Soviet Union	1:07.9	
2	Don McKenzie	United States	1:08.1	
3	José Sylvio Fiolo	Brazil	1:08.6	
4	Yevhen Mykhailov	Soviet Union	1:08.8	
5	Bill Mahony	Canada	1:09.7	
6	Gregor Betz	West Germany	1:09.8	
7	Józef Klukowski	Poland	1:10.9	
8	Ken Merten	United States	1:11.6	'

=== Final ===
Rank	Athlete	Country	Time	Notes
1	Don McKenzie	United States	1:07.7	OR
2	Vladimir Kosinsky	Soviet Union	1:08.0	
3	Nikolai Pankin	Soviet Union	1:08.0	
4	José Sylvio Fiolo	Brazil	1:08.1	
5	Yevgeny Mikhaylov	Soviet Union	1:08.4	
6	Ian O'Brien	Australia	1:08.6	
7	Alberto Forelli	Argentina	1:08.7	
8	Egon Henninger	East Germany	1:09.7	

Key: OR = Olympic record
