= Swimming at the 1968 Summer Olympics – Men's 200 metre breaststroke =

Men's 200 metre breaststroke at the Games of the XIX Olympiad
- Venue: Alberca Olímpica Francisco Márquez
- Dates: 21 October 1968 (heats); 22 October 1968 (final)
- Competitors: 36 from 23 nations
- Winning time: 2:28.27

Medalists
1st place, gold medalist(s)		Felipe Muñoz	Mexico
2nd place, silver medalist(s)		Vladimir Kosinsky	Soviet Union
3rd place, bronze medalist(s)		Brian Job	United States

The men's 200 metre breaststroke event at the 1968 Summer Olympics was held from 21 to 22 October 1968 at the Alberca Olímpica Francisco Márquez.

== Records ==
Prior to this competition, the existing world and Olympic records were as follows.

World record	Vladimir Kosinsky (URS)	2:27.4	Tallinn, Soviet Union	3 April 1968
Olympic record	Ian O'Brien (AUS)	2:27.8	Tokyo, Japan	15 October 1964

== Competition format ==
The competition consists of two rounds: heats and a final. The swimmers with the best eight times in the heats advance to the final.

== Schedule ==
All times are Central Time Zone (UTC-6)

Date	Time	Round
21 October	10:00	Heats
22 October	17:00	Final

== Results ==
=== Heats ===
Heat 1

Rank	Lane	Swimmer	Nation	Time	Note
1	3	Bill Mahony	Canada	2:36.4	
2	6	Ian O'Brien	Australia	2:36.8	
2	4	Theo Bolkart	West Germany	2:36.8	
4	5	Thomas Aretz	West Germany	2:39.0	
5	8	José Sylvio Fiolo	Brazil	2:42.1	
6	1	Nicolas Gilliard	Switzerland	2:44.0	
7	7	Rafael Hernández Rojas	Mexico	2:44.8	
8	2	Eduardo Moreno	Mexico	2:46.7	

Heat 2

Rank	Lane	Athlete	Country	Time	Note
1	5	Philip Long	United States	2:33.1	Q
2	6	Egon Henninger	East Germany	2:34.2	Q
3	3	Michael Günther	West Germany	2:40.7	
4	7	Alberto Forelli	Argentina	2:41.7	
5	4	Roger Roberts	Great Britain	2:42.2	
6	2	Leiknir Jónsson	Iceland	2:48.8	

Heat 3

Rank	Lane	Athlete	Country	Time	Note
1	2	Vladimir Kosinsky	Soviet Union	2:31.9	Q
2	5	Nobutaka Taguchi	Japan	2:35.5	
3	6	Ken Merten	United States	2:37.0	
4	8	Liam Ball	Ireland	2:39.8	
5	1	José Durán	Spain	2:40.3	
6	3	Józef Klukowski	Poland	2:41.6	
7	4	Gershon Shefa	Israel	2:42.6	
8	7	Abel Muñoz	El Salvador	3:02.8	

Heat 4

Rank	Lane	Athlete	Country	Time	Note
1	2	Brian Job	United States	2:31.5	Q
2	4	Nikolay Pankin	Soviet Union	2:33.1	Q
3	7	Osamu Tsurumine	Japan	2:33.9	
4	6	Ladislau Koszta	Romania	2:36.4	
5	5	Osvaldo Boretto	Argentina	2:38.8	
6	8	Stuart Roberts	Great Britain	2:39.1	
7	1	Slavko Kurbanović	Yugoslavia	2:39.9	
8	3	Yohan Kende	Israel	2:44.3	

Heat 5

Rank	Lane	Athlete	Country	Time	Note
1	3	Felipe Muñoz	Mexico	2:31.1	Q
2	2	Yevhen Mykhailov	Soviet Union	2:32.8	Q
3	5	Klaus Katzur	East Germany	2:36.2	
4	7	Thomas Johnsson	Sweden	2:38.0	
5	6	Amman Jalmaani	Philippines	2:42.6	
6	4	Ivan Gomina	Colombia	2:45.0	

=== Final ===
Rank	Lane	Athlete	Country	Time	Notes
1	4	Felipe Muñoz	Mexico	2:28.7	
2	3	Vladimir Kosinsky	Soviet Union	2:29.2	
3	5	Brian Job	United States	2:29.9	
4	7	Nikolay Pankin	Soviet Union	2:30.3	
5	6	Yevgeny Mikhaylov	Soviet Union	2:32.8	
6	8	Egon Henninger	East Germany	2:33.2	
7	2	Philip Long	United States	2:33.6	
8	1	Osamu Tsurumine	Japan	2:34.9	
