= Hazboun =

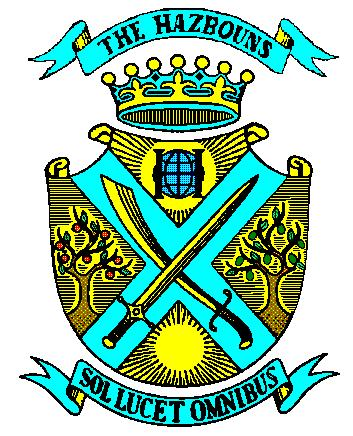
The Hazboun family coat of arms based on a 1958 reproduction attributed to the Hazboun family forebears, who had come from Portugal from the Portuguese Royal Family, as related in Legend 1 of the Hazboun Family History. The coat of arms was attributed to Raphael Hazboun and illustrated by Tatul Sonentz Papzian. The seven branches of the Hazboun family's princely origins are represented by the seven crown jewels, rays, branches, leaves, and fruit on the Olive and Orange trees. Note the Crusader and Saracens swords symbolizing the comingling of European and Arabic bloodlines. The Latin inscription reads “Sol Lucet Omnibus” (The Sun Shines On All Things) to represent that the Hazboun Family is present wherever the sun shines across the world.

Hazboun (Arabic:حزبون) and Hasbun are surnames from the Najajreh Bethlehem clan.

The Hazboun family is a distinguished lineage with origins tracing back to the Ottoman period in Palestine. The earliest documented ancestor of the family, Sulaiman Hazboun, was born in Ottoman Palestine in 1610, marking the establishment of a familial presence in the region.

According to these traditions, It is held that the family descends from noble bloodlines connected to the Portuguese royal family. Historical accounts within the family suggest that members of this royal lineage migrated to the Holy Land during the era of the Crusades, thereby establishing a direct and prestigious connection between the Hazboun family and European aristocracy.

== Etymology ==
The name Hazboun derives from the (Hebrew / Canaanite ) word Heshbon (חֶשְׁבּוֹן) which derives from the root of letters ח־ש־ב (H-Sh-B), meaning "to calculate", or "to plan" or "thinker". Thus, the surname can symbolize qualities such as intelligence, contemplation, and practical wisdom.

== Asbun ==
- Juan Pereda Asbún (1931–2012), Politician and former president of Bolivia. also held ministerial positions under president Hugo Banzer, including Minister of Industry and Commerce and Minister of the Interior, before briefly becoming President of Bolivia in 1978 through a military-backed coup.
- Luis Liendo Asbún (born 1978), Chilean football player
- Javier Asbun (born 1953), Bolivian sports shooter

== Hasbún ==
- Amin Abel Hasbún (born 1942), Political activist killed in police raid in the Dominican Republic
- Jorge Elías Hasbún (born 1990 in Talca, Chile). Prominent political figure recognized for contributions to public policy and governance.
- Carlos Hasbún (born 1949), Salvadoran athlete
- Hato Hasbún (1946–2017), Franzi Hato Hasbún Barake was a prominent Salvadoran sociologist and politician of Palestinian descent. He was widely recognized as a close advisor to former President Mauricio Funes and played a significant role in shaping El Salvador's education and strategic policy.
- Ignacio Hasbún (born 1990), Chilean footballer
- Rodrigo Hasbún (born 1981), Bolivian writer
- Rosa Hasbún (born 1952), Salvadoran swimmer
- Sergio Hasbún (born 1947), Salvadoran swimmer

== Hazboun ==
- Ibrahim Hazboun (born 1947), Palestinian astrologer
- George Hazboun (born 1945), Jordanian lawyer
- Nadya Hazboun (born 1983/1984), Palestinian-Czech jewelry and fashion designer
- Sabine Hazboun (born 1994), Palestinian swimmer
- Samar Hazboun (born 1985), Palestinian photographer
