= Hasbún =

Hasbún is a surname from Bethlehem origin. Notable people with the surname include:

- Carlos Hasbún (born 1949), Salvadoran athlete
- Hato Hasbún (1946–2017), Salvadoran politician
- Ignacio Hasbún (born 1990), Chilean footballer
- Rodrigo Hasbún (born 1981), Bolivian writer
- Rosa Hasbún (born 1952), Salvadoran swimmer
- Sergio Hasbún (born 1947), Salvadoran swimmer
- Amin Abel Hasbún (born 1942-1972), Dominican activist and writer
