= El Salvador at the 1972 Summer Olympics =

- IOC code: ESA (SAL used at these Games)
- NOC: El Salvador Olympic Committee

in Munich
- Competitors: 11 (11 men and 0 women) in 2 sports
- Flag bearer: Salvador Vilanova
- Medals: Gold 0 Silver 0 Bronze 0 Total 0

Summer Olympics appearances (overview)
- 1968; 1972; 1976–1980; 1984; 1988; 1992; 1996; 2000; 2004; 2008; 2012; 2016; 2020; 2024

El Salvador competed at the 1972 Summer Olympics in Munich, West Germany, from 28 July to 12 August 1984. This was the nation's second appearance at the Olympics.

Comité Olímpico de El Salvador sent a total of 11 athletes to the Games, all men, to compete in 2 sports. Swimmer Salvador Vilanova was selected to carry his nation's flag during the opening ceremony.

== Competitors ==
Comité Olímpico de El Salvador selected a team of 11 athletes, all men, to compete in 2 sports. Skeet shooter Andrés Amador, at age 47, was the oldest athlete of the team, while swimmer Salvador Vilanova was the youngest at age 19.

The following is the list of number of competitors participating in the Games.

Sport	Men	Women	Total
Shooting	4	0	4
Swimming	7	0	7
Total	11	0	11

== Shooting ==
Men

Athlete	Event	Final	
Athlete	Event	Score	Rank
José Luis Rosales	25 m rapid fire pistol	543	56
José Mario Váldez	50 m rifle (prone)	569	98
Juan Antonio Valencia	50 m rifle (prone)	576	91
Juan Antonio Valencia	50 m rifle (3 positions)	1053	62
Andrés Amador	Skeet	180	47

== Swimming ==
Men

Athlete	Event	Heat		Semifinal		Final	
Athlete	Event	Result	Rank	Result	Rank	Result	Rank
Antonio Ferracuti	100 m freestyle	56.69	5	Did not advance			
Salvador Vilanova	100 m freestyle	56.57	7	Did not advance			
Tomás Rengifo	200 m freestyle	2:08.67	7	—		Did not advance	
Salvador Vilanova	200 m freestyle	Did not start					
Sergio Hasbún	100 m backstroke	1:06.53	6	Did not advance			
Reynaldo Patiño	100 m backstroke	Did not start					
Sergio Hasbún	200 m backstroke	2:27.93	6	—		Did not advance	
Piero Ferracuti	100 m breaststroke	1:16.74	7	Did not advance			
Alejandro Cabrera	200 m breaststroke	2:56.60	8	—		Did not advance	
Piero Ferracuti	200 m breaststroke	2:45.73	7	—		Did not advance	
Salvador Vilanova	100 m butterfly	1:01.25	6	Did not advance			
Antonio Ferracuti; Reynaldo Patiño; Tomás Rengifo; Salvador Vilanova	4 × 100 m freestyle relay	3:49.14	7	—		Did not advance	
Antonio Ferracuti; Sergio Hasbún; Tomás Rengifo; Salvador Vilanova	4 × 200 m freestyle relay	Did not start					
