= Ernesto Durón =

Salvadoran swimmer (born 1952)

Personal information
- Full name: Ernesto Durón
- Born: 12 September 1952 (age 73) San Salvador, El Salvador

Sport
- Sport: Swimming

Ernesto Durón (born 12 September 1952) is a Salvadoran former swimmer. He competed for El Salvador at the 1968 Summer Olympics at their first appearance at an Olympic Games. There, he competed in the men's 100 metre freestyle, men's 200 metre freestyle, and men's 4 × 100 metre freestyle relay, though did not medal in any event.

== Biography ==
Ernesto Durón was born on 12 September 1952 in San Salvador, El Salvador. As a swimmer, she competed for El Salvador in international competition.

Durón was selected to compete for El Salvador at the 1968 Summer Olympics in Mexico City, Mexico, for the nation's first appearance at an Olympic Games at a sporting capacity. For the 1968 Summer Games, he was entered to compete in three events: the men's 100 metre freestyle, men's 200 metre freestyle, and men's 4 × 100 metre freestyle relay. He first competed in the men's 4 × 100 metre freestyle relay with his teammates: José Alvarado, Rubén Guerrero, and Salvador Vilanova. Together, they competed in the qualifying heats of the event on 17 October in the first heat against seven other relay teams. There, they recorded a time of 4:08.3 and placed last, failing to advance to the finals. Their time was the slowest amongst the 16 relay teams that competed in the event. Durón then competed in the qualifying heats of the men's 100 metre freestyle the following day in the ninth heat, the last heat. He competed against seven other swimmers. There, he recorded a time of 1:03.8 and placed last in his heat, failing to advance further to the semifinals as only the first 24 swimmers who had the fastest times were able to qualify. His last event was the men's 200 metre freestyle, competing in the qualifying heats on 24 October in the ninth heat against four other swimmers. There, he recorded a time of 2:24.1 and placed last, again failing to advance further past the qualifying heats.
