= Juan Molina =

Juan Molina may refer to:

- John John Molina (Juan Molina, born 1965), Puerto Rican former boxer
- Juan Molina (cyclist) (born 1948), Salvadoan cyclist
- Juan Ignacio Molina (1740–1829), Chilean Jesuit priest, naturalist and historian
- Juan Manuel Molina (born 1979), Spanish former race walker
- Juan Ramón Molina (1875–1908), Honduran poet
- Juan Bautista Molina, Argentine military commander and ultranationalist
