= José Alvarado =

José Alvarado may refer to:

- José Alvarado Nieves, real name of Brazo de Plata (1963–2021), Mexican professional wrestler
- José Alvarado (swimmer) (born 1953), Salvadoran former swimmer
- José Alvarado (baseball) (born 1995), Venezuelan MLB pitcher
- Jose Alvarado (basketball) (born 1998), American NBA player
