= Shooting at the 1968 Summer Olympics – Mixed skeet =

Mixed skeet at the Games of the XIX Olympiad
- Date: 21–22 October 1968
- Competitors: 52 from 30 nations

Medalists
1st place, gold medalist(s)		Yevgeny Petrov	Soviet Union
2nd place, silver medalist(s)		Romano Garagnani	Italy
3rd place, bronze medalist(s)		Konrad Wirnhier	West Germany

The mixed skeet was a shooting sports event held as part of the Shooting at the 1968 Summer Olympics programme. The competition was held on 21 and 22 October 1968 at the shooting ranges in Mexico City. 52 shooters from 30 nations competed.

== Final standing ==
Rank	Athlete	Country	Score	Gold shoot-off	Silver shoot-off	Notes
1	Yevgeny Petrov	Soviet Union	198	25		=WR
2	Romano Garagnani	Italy	198	24	25	=WR
3	Konrad Wirnhier	West Germany	198	24	23	=WR
4	Yury Tsuranov	Soviet Union	196			
5	Pedro Gianella	Peru	194			
6	Nicolas Atalah	Chile	194			
7	Jorge Jottar	Chile	194			
8	Panagiotis Xanthakos	Greece	194			
9	Menelaos Mikhailidis	Greece	192			
10	Ernst Pedersen	Denmark	191			
11	Gheorghe Sencovici	Romania	191			
12	Miguel Marina	Spain	191			
13	Nuria Ortíz	Mexico	191			
14	Alec Bonnett	Great Britain	191			
15	Donald Sanderlin	Canada	191			
16	Earl Herring	United States	190			
17	Arne Karlsson	Sweden	190			
18	Alain Plante	France	190			
19	Robert Rodale	United States	189			
20	Arne Orrgård	Sweden	189			
21	Karl Meyer zu Hölsen	West Germany	189			
22	Tuukka Mäkelä	Finland	189			
23	Włodzimierz Danek	Poland	189			
24	Wiesław Gawlikowski	Poland	188			
25	Giancarlo Chiono	Italy	188			
26	Colin Sephton	Great Britain	188			
27	Rafael Batista	Puerto Rico	187			
28	Karni Singh	India	187			
29	Ignacio Huguet	Cuba	187			
30	Delfin Gómez	Cuba	187			
31	Mario Pani	Mexico	187			
32	Paul Vittet	Switzerland	186			
33	Benny Jensen	Denmark	186			
34	Atanas Tasev	Bulgaria	185			
35	Jean-Paul Faber	France	185			
36	José Luis Martínez	Spain	183			
37	Harry Willsie	Canada	181			
38	Gerry Brady	Ireland	180			
39	Spiro Hayek	Lebanon	180			
40	Anton Manolov	Bulgaria	180			
41	Tanios Harb	Lebanon	179			
42	Carlos Pacheco	Costa Rica	176			
43	Andrés Amador	El Salvador	175			
44	Francis Cornet	Belgium	174			
45	Alberto Guerrero	Puerto Rico	174			
46	Joseph Grech	Malta	173			
47	Arthur McMahon	Ireland	170			
48	Riad Yunes	Dominican Republic	170			
49	Boonkua Lourvanij	Thailand	150			
50	Ricardo Soundy	El Salvador	147			
51	Jorge André	Costa Rica	75			
52	Luis Santana	Dominican Republic	57			
