= Luis Santana =

Luis Santana may refer to:

- Luis Santana (sport shooter) (born 1937), Dominican sport shooter
- Luis Santana (boxer) (born 1958), Dominican boxer
- Luis Santana (footballer) (born 1991), Ecuadorian footballer
