= Eduardo Ramos =

Eduardo Ramos may refer to:

- Eduardo Ramos (sailor) (born 1944), Brazilian sailor
- Eduardo Ramos (Mexican footballer) (born 1949), Mexican football defender
- Eduardo Ramos (swimmer) (born 1953), Salvadoran swimmer
- Eduardo Ramos (racing driver) (born 1966), Argentine racing driver
- Eduardo Ramos (Brazilian footballer) (born 1986), Brazilian football attacking midfielder
- Edu Ramos (born 1992), Spanish football midfielder
