= Javier Jiménez =

Javier Jiménez may refer to:

- Javier Jiménez Espriú (born 1937), Mexican academic
- Javier Jiménez (swimmer) (born 1948), Mexican swimmer
- Javier Jiménez (Costa Rican footballer) (born 1952), Costa Rican football winger
- Javier Jiménez (mayor) (born 1952), Puerto Rican politician and mayor of San Sebastián
- Javi Jiménez (footballer, born 1979), Spanish football attacking midfielder
- Javi Jiménez (footballer, born 1987), Spanish football goalkeeper
- Javier Jiménez (volleyball) (born 1989), Cuban volleyball player
- Javi Jiménez (footballer, born 1996), Spanish football leftback
- Javi Jiménez (footballer, born 1997), Spanish football centre-back
- Javier Jiménez (footballer, born 2000), Aruban football midfielder
