= Roger Roberts =

Roger Roberts may refer to:

- Roger Roberts, Baron Roberts of Llandudno (born 1935), Welsh Liberal Democrat politician, Methodist minister, and life peer
- Roger Roberts (swimmer) (born 1948), competed in three events at the 1968 Summer Olympics
