= Klukowski =

Klukowski (feminine: Klukowska; plural: Klukowscy) is a Polish surname. Notable people with the surname include:

- Józef Klukowski (1894–1944), Polish sculptor
- Józef Klukowski (swimmer) (born 1946), Polish swimmer
- Ken Klukowski, American legal counsel
- Michael Klukowski (born 1981), Canadian soccer player
- Yan Klukowski (born 1987), English footballer
- Zygmunt Klukowski (1885–1959), Polish physician
