= Bolkart =

Bolkart is a surname. Notable people with the surname include:

- Max Bolkart (1932–2025), West German ski jumper
- Theo Bolkart (born 1948), German swimmer
