= Ricardo Menéndez =

Ricardo Menéndez can refer to:

- Ricardo Menéndez (sportsman) (1929–?), Salvadoran sports shooter
- Ricardo Menéndez (politician) (born 1969), Venezuelan politician
- Ricardo Menéndez March, Mexican-born New Zealand activist and politician
- Ricardo Menéndez Salmón, Spanish novelist and writer
