= Arne Karlsson (sport shooter) =

Swedish sports shooter

Personal information
- Born: 25 April 1946 (age 80) Linköping, Sweden

Sport
- Sport: Sports shooting

Arne Karlsson (born 25 April 1946) is a Swedish former sports shooter. He competed in the skeet event at the 1968 Summer Olympics.
