= José Luis Martínez (sport shooter) =

Spanish sports shooter

Personal information
- Born: 8 November 1926 San Sebastián, Spain
- Died: 8 January 2014 (aged 87) San Sebastián, Spain

Sport
- Sport: Sports shooting

José Luis Martínez (8 November 1926 – 8 January 2014) was a Spanish sports shooter. He competed in the skeet event at the 1968 Summer Olympics.
