= Nadya Hazboun =

- نادية حزبون
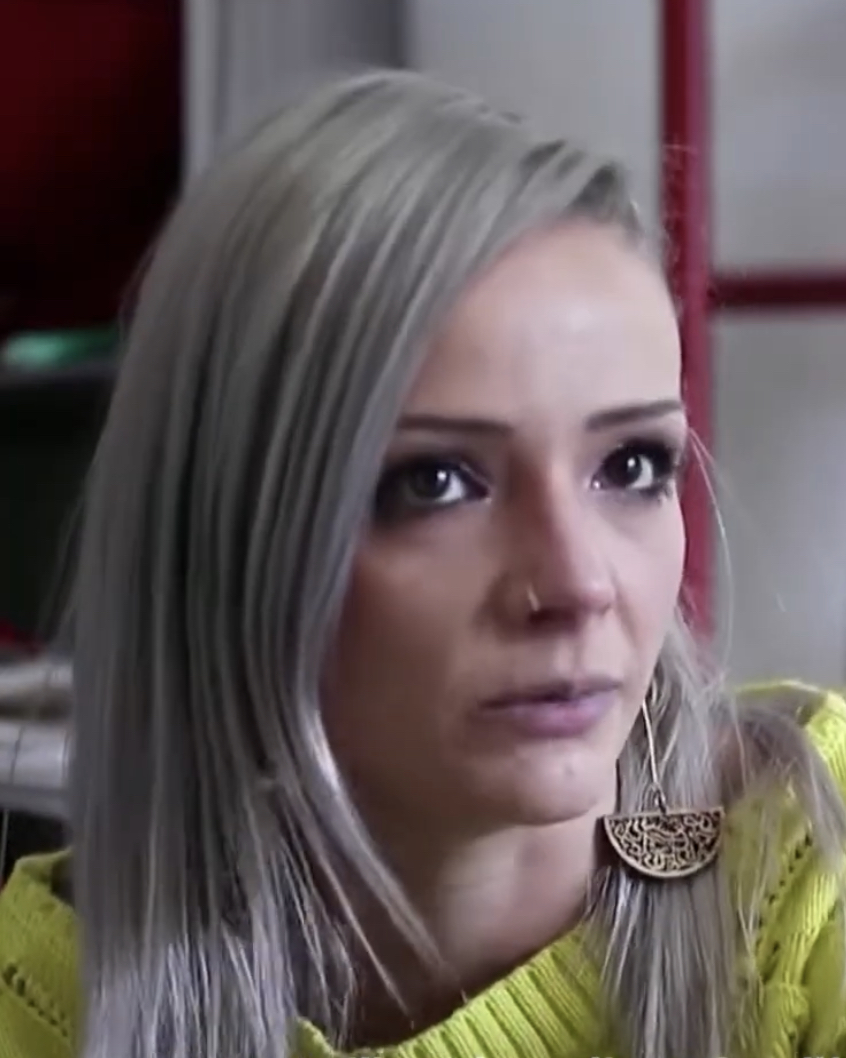
- Hazboun in 2022
- Born: 1983/1984
- Other name: Nadya Hazbunova
- Years active: 2012–present
- Family: Samar Hazboun (sister)
- Website: www.nadyah.com

Nadya Hazboun (Arabic: نادية حزبون; born 1983/1984), also known as Nadya Hazbunova, is a Palestinian-Czech jewellery and fashion designer from Bethlehem. She gained prominence in the 2010s for her jewellery line Olivewood, which incorporates traditional Palestinian olive wood carving, as well as NH Fashion.

== Life and career ==
Born to a Palestinian father and a Czech mother, Hazboun grew up in a Catholic family in Bethlehem. Her sisters include Samar, a photographer and photojournalist, and Christina, who writes and works in music. Hazboun completed a Master of Arts (MA) in Media in Prague and took fashion design and journalism courses at the London College of Fashion.

Hazboun began her career working as a designer in Prague. Hazboun debuted her NH Fashion/Nadya Hazbunova womenswear designs and her jewellery line Olivewood at the 2012 Amman Fashion Week. Hazboun initially had her products manufactured from abroad before moving back to Bethlehem in 2013, where she opened a showroom and atelier near Nativity Square.

Made from Palestinian olive woods from the Bethlehem area and combining modern designs aimed at young people with traditional carving techniques, Hazboun's Olivewood jewellery features Palestine-related calligraphy and imagery. Furthermore, her Identity collection featured fingerprints, which represent Palestinians' hawwiyeh identity cards and checkpoints, inscribed with Mahmoud Darwish's poem "Record I am an Arab" on clothing as well as rings made from local stone and clay. The collection expanded to olive wood sandals.

In March 2015, Nadya Hazbunova featured at the 3rd Ziryab Fashion Show in London. Palestine's Business Women Forum nominated Hazboun to represent Palestine at the 2016 Caspian Fashion Week in Astrakhan. The fashion show was titled Made in Palestine and featured 15 clothing pieces by Hazboun. Arbuz Today wrote that Hazboun's modern Palestinian fashion "stood out". They returned in 2018.

As of 2017, her sister Christina helped run the business. Due to the COVID-19 lockdown, Hazboun closed her in-person operations but continued selling her designs online. In response to lockdown, Hazboun founded a programme called Betwomen that offers training courses for local women and helps them start businesses. The programme is supported by the Holy Land Association. In addition, Hazboun has lectured in Fashion Design at Birzeit University and headed the department at Hebron's Smart University College for Modern Education.
