= Karl Meyer zu Hölsen =

German sports shooter

Personal information
- Born: 28 August 1927 Stemmen, Germany
- Died: 16 May 2013 (aged 85)

Sport
- Sport: Sports shooting

Karl Meyer zu Hölsen (28 August 1927 – 16 May 2013) was a German sports shooter. He competed in the skeet event at the 1968 Summer Olympics for West Germany.
