= Benny Jensen =

Danish sports shooter (1934–1995)

Personal information
- Born: 24 October 1934 Køge, Denmark
- Died: 2 June 1995 (aged 60)

Sport
- Sport: Sports shooting

Benny Jensen (24 October 1934 – 2 June 1995) was a Danish sports shooter. He competed in the skeet event at the 1968 Summer Olympics.
