= Menelaos Mikhailidis =

Greek sports shooter

Personal information
- Born: 1947 (age 78–79)

Sport
- Sport: Sports shooting

Menelaos Mikhailidis (born 1947) is a Greek former sports shooter. He competed in the skeet event at the 1968 Summer Olympics.
