= Alain Plante =

French sports shooter

Personal information
- Born: 4 October 1943 (age 82) Paris, France

Sport
- Sport: Sports shooting

Alain Plante (born 4 October 1943) is a French former sports shooter. He competed in the skeet event at the 1968 Summer Olympics.
