= Pedro Gianella =

Peruvian sports shooter

Personal information
- Born: 3 October 1932 (age 93) San Vicente, Peru

Sport
- Sport: Sports shooting

Pedro Gianella (born 3 October 1932) is a Peruvian former sports shooter. He competed in the skeet event at the 1968 Summer Olympics.
