= Vladimir Kosinsky =

Soviet swimmer (1945–2011)

Personal information
- Born: February 26, 1945 Kotlas, Soviet Union
- Died: July 14, 2011 (aged 66)

Sport
- Sport: Swimming
- Strokes: Breaststroke
Medal record
Representing the Soviet Union
Olympic Games
Silver medal – second place	1968 Mexico City	100 metres breaststroke
Silver medal – second place	1968 Mexico City	200 metres breaststroke
Bronze medal – third place	1968 Mexico City	4×100 metres medley relay

Vladimir Ivanovich Kosinsky (Russian: Владимир Иванович Косинский; 26 February 1945 – 14 July 2011) was a Soviet swimmer. Over his career he won two silver and one bronze Olympic medals for the Soviet Union. He was born in Kotlas, Arkhangelsk Oblast, Russia.

== See also ==
- World record progression 200 metres breaststroke
