= Atanas Tasev =

Bulgarian sports shooter

Personal information
- Born: 24 May 1921 Radomir, Bulgaria

Sport
- Sport: Sports shooting

Atanas Tasev (Bulgarian: Атанас Тасев; born 24 May 1921, date of death unknown) is a Bulgarian former sports shooter. He competed in the skeet event at the 1968 Summer Olympics.
