= Tanios Harb =

Lebanese sports shooter (born 1925)

Personal information
- Born: 1925 Beirut, Lebanon

Sport
- Sport: Sports shooting

Tanios Harb (born 1925) is a Lebanese former sports shooter. He competed in the skeet event at the 1968 Summer Olympics.
