= Earl Herring =

American sports shooter (1931–2025)

Personal information
- Full name: Earl Francis Herring
- Born: December 28, 1931 Emmitsburg, Maryland, U.S.
- Died: June 25, 2025 (aged 93) Helotes, Texas, U.S.

Sport
- Sport: Sports shooting

Earl Herring (December 28, 1931 – June 25, 2025) was an American sports shooter. He competed in the skeet event at the 1968 Summer Olympics. Herring died on June 25, 2025, at the age of 93.
