= Jorge André =

Costa Rican sports shooter

Personal information
- Born: 11 May 1919 San José, Costa Rica
- Died: 23 July 1994 (aged 75)

Sport
- Sport: Sports shooting

Jorge André (11 May 1919 – 23 July 1994) was a Costa Rican sports shooter. He competed in the skeet event at the 1968 Summer Olympics.
