= Nicolas Atalah =

Chilean sports shooter (born 1938)

Personal information
- Born: 11 September 1938 (age 87) Viña del Mar, Chile

Sport
- Sport: Sports shooting

Nicolas Atalah (born 11 September 1938) is a Chilean former sports shooter. He competed in the skeet event at the 1968 Summer Olympics.
