= Alec Bonnett =

British sports shooter

Personal information
- Full name: Eustace Alec Bonnett
- Nationality: British
- Born: 8 September 1922 Watton-at-Stone, Hertfordshire, England
- Died: 20 July 1992 (aged 69)

Sport
- Sport: Sports shooting

Alec Bonnett (8 September 1922 – 20 July 1992) was a British sports shooter. Bonnet competed in the skeet event at the 1968 Summer Olympics. He represented England in the skeet, at the 1974 British Commonwealth Games in Christchurch, New Zealand.
