= Mario Pani (sport shooter) =

Mexican sports shooter

Personal information
- Born: 15 May 1936 (age 90) Mexico City, Mexico

Sport
- Sport: Sports shooting

Mario Pani (born 13 May 1936) is a Mexican former sports shooter. He competed in the skeet event at the 1968 Summer Olympics. He finished 31st in the competition, achieving a score of 187.
