= Jean-Paul Faber =

French sports shooter (1930–2018)

Personal information
- Born: 8 December 1930 Corbeil, France
- Died: 19 February 2018 (aged 87)

Sport
- Sport: Sports shooting

Jean-Paul Faber (8 December 1930 – 19 February 2018) was a French sports shooter. He competed in the skeet event at the 1968 Summer Olympics.
