= Włodzimierz Danek =

Polish sport shooter (1945–2022)

Personal information
- Born: 3 July 1943 Bochnia, Poland
- Died: 30 December 2022 (aged 79)

Sport
- Sport: Sport shooting

Włodzimierz Danek (3 July 1943 – 30 December 2022) was a Polish sport shooter. He competed in the skeet event at the 1968 Summer Olympics.

Danek died on 30 December 2022, at the age of 79.
