= Yohan Kende =

Israeli swimmer

Yoel Kende יואל קנדה
Personal information
- Nationality: Israeli
- Born: March 3, 1949 (age 77) Timișoara, Romania
- Height: 5 ft 10 in (178 cm)
- Weight: 154 lb (70 kg)

Sport
- Sport: Swimming
- Strokes: breastroke
Medal record
Representing Israel
Asian Games
Bronze medal – third place	1970 Bangkok	4x100m medley relay

Yoel Kende (Hebrew: יואל קנדה; born March 3, 1949) is an Israeli former Olympic swimmer. He was born in Timișoara, Romania.

== Swimming career ==
Kende competed for Israel at the 1968 Summer Olympics in Mexico City, Mexico, in swimming at the age of 19. He swam in the Men's 100 metre Breaststroke and came in 6th in Heat 4 with a time of 1:12.3, and in the Men's 200 metre Breaststroke and came in 8th in Heat 4 with a time of 2:44.3. When he competed in the Olympics he was 5 feet 10 inches (178 cm) tall, and weighed 154 pounds (70 kg).
