= Arne Orrgård =

Swedish sport shooter

Personal information
- Born: 21 September 1943 (age 82) Ludvika, Sweden

Sport
- Sport: Sports shooting

Arne Orrgård (born 21 September 1943) is a Swedish former sports shooter. He competed in the skeet event at the 1968 Summer Olympics.
