= David Perkowski =

American swimmer (born 1947)

Personal information
- Nicknames: "Dave," "Perk"
- National team: United States
- Born: July 23, 1947 (age 79) New York, New York, U.S.
- Occupation: Thoracic Surgeon
- Height: 5 ft 10 in (1.78 m)
- Weight: 150 lb (68 kg)

Sport
- Sport: Swimming
- Event: 100 breaststroke
- Strokes: Breaststroke
- Club: Bloomington Swim Club
- College team: Indiana University
- Coach: Joe Della Badia (Westport High); James Counsilman (Indiana U.); George Haines (68 Olympics)

David Perkowski (born July 23, 1947) is an American former competition swimmer, who competed for Indiana University, and participated in the men's 100-meter breaststroke at the 1968 Mexico City Olympics. He later graduated the Indiana University School of Medicine in 1979, and had a career as a thoracic surgeon in California.

== Early life ==
Perkowski was born in Westfield, New Jersey on July 23, 1947, and grew up in the city. He graduated in 1965 from Westfield High School, where he won six individual state titles primarily under Westfield's swim coach Joe Della Badia. As a Westfield Junior, he anticipated defending his New Jersey State title held at Princeton University, having already swam a personal record of 1:03.0 for the 100-yard breaststroke, three seconds faster than his former championship state time. In his Junior year, the Westfield Blue Devils were undefeated in dual meets, capturing first place in the Union County Conference. As a High School Senior, at the YMCA National Swimming Championship in April, 1965 at the Westport YMCA, Perkowski won the 200-yard breaststroke and the 100-yard breaststroke with a time of 1:01.8, sharing top point scorer honors, and helping to lead the Westport YMCA to a National YMCA team championship.

== 1968 Mexico City Olympics ==
Perkowski represented the United States at the 1968 Summer Olympics in Mexico City where he was managed by Hall of Fame Head U.S. Olympic Coach George Haines. He competed in the semifinals of the men's 100-meter breaststroke and finished third in his heat, and ninth overall with a time of 1:09.0. American Don McKenzie took the gold medal with a time of 1:07.7, Vladimir Kosinsky of Russia took the silver with a time of 1:08.0, and Russian Nikolay Pankin took the bronze with a time of 1:08.0.

=== Indiana University ===
Perkowski attended Indiana University in Bloomington, Indiana, where he swam for coach Doc Counsilman's Indiana Hoosiers swimming and diving team in National Collegiate Athletic Association (NCAA) competition from 1967 to 1969. He was a four-time All-American, and was a key contributor to the Hoosiers' NCAA national team championships in 1968 and 1969.

=== Medical career ===
Petrowski had long harbored an ambition to become a physician. After graduating Indiana and attending the Olympics, he entered the Indiana University School of Medicine, and did a cardiothoracic surgical residency in Indiana, completing it in 1979. In California, he served on the staff of Orange County Thoracic and Cardiovascular Surgeons. He then ascended to the role of a Cardiac Surgical Director at Saddleback Memorial Medical. In 1994, Perkowski performed Saddleback Memorial Heart Institute's first replacement of an aortic valve.
