= Tuukka Mäkelä (sport shooter) =

Finnish sport shooter

Personal information
- Full name: Tuukka Tapio Mäkelä
- Born: 5 September 1927 Pori, Finland
- Died: 2 August 2005 (aged 77) Helsinki, Finland

Sport
- Sport: Sports shooting

Tuukka Tapio Mäkelä (5 September 1927 – 2 August 2005) was a Finnish sports shooter. He competed in the skeet event at the 1968 Summer Olympics.
