= Ken Merten =

American swimmer (born 1945)

Personal information
- Full name: Kenneth Owen Merten
- Nickname: "Ken"
- National team: United States
- Born: May 4, 1945 (age 81) Akron, Ohio, U.S.
- Height: 6 ft 1 in (1.85 m)
- Weight: 176 lb (80 kg)

Sport
- Sport: Swimming
- Strokes: Breaststroke
- Club: Los Angeles Athletic Club
- College team: Southern Methodist University
Medal record
Men's swimming
Representing the United States
Pan American Games
Silver medal – second place	1963 São Paulo	200 m breaststroke
Bronze medal – third place	1967 Winnipeg	100 m breaststroke
Bronze medal – third place	1967 Winnipeg	200 m breaststroke
Summer Universiade
Gold medal – first place	1967 Tokyo	4×100 m medley
Gold medal – first place	1967 Tokyo	100 m breaststroke
Gold medal – first place	1967 Tokyo	200 m breaststroke

Kenneth Owen Merten (born May 4, 1945) is an American former competition swimmer, three-time Pan American Games medalist, and former world record-holder.

Merten won three medals in his breaststroke specialty at the Pan American Games. At the 1963 Pan American Games in São Paulo, Brazil, he won a silver medal for his runner-up finish in the 200-meter breaststroke. Four years later at the 1967 Pan American Games in Winnipeg, Manitoba, he received a pair of bronze medals for his third-place performances in the 100-meter and 200-meter breaststroke.

Merten represented the United States at the 1968 Summer Olympics in Mexico City. He competed in the semifinals of the men's 100-meter breaststroke, finishing with a time of 1:11.6. He also swam in the preliminary heats of the men's 200-meter breaststroke, clocking a time of 2:37.0, but did not advance.

Merten was born in Akron, Ohio, but grew up in Los Angeles, California. He attended Southern Methodist University (SMU) in Dallas, Texas, where he swam for the SMU Mustangs swimming and diving team in national Collegiate Athletic Association (NCAA) competition. While he was an SMU swimmer, he won NCAA individual national championships in the 100- and 200-yard breaststroke, the first ever in the history of the SMU swim team, and set new American records in doing so.

Merten helped set a new world record of 3:57.2 in the 4×100-meter medley relay as a member of the winning U.S. relay team at the 1967 World University Games on August 31, 1967. The record was broken by an East German relay team a little over two months later. At the University Games, he also gold medals in the 100- and 200-meter breaststroke events.

He is now retired after a 32-year career as a teacher, school administrator and coach. He actively competes in windsurfing within his age group, and is an active participant in Swim Across America, a non-profit organization that uses Olympic swimmers to raise funds for cancer research. He lives in Dallas, Texas.

== See also ==
- List of Southern Methodist University people
- World record progression 4 × 100 metres medley relay
