= Giancarlo Chiono =

Italian sport shooter

Personal information
- Born: 26 August 1936 Turin, Italy
- Died: 25 July 1974 (aged 37)

Sport
- Sport: Sports shooting

Giancarlo Chiono (26 August 1936 – 25 July 1974) was an Italian sports shooter. He competed in the skeet event at the 1968 Summer Olympics.
