= Samar Hazboun =

- سمر حزبون
- Born: 1985; Jerusalem
- Education: Metropolitan University Prague; University of Westminster
- Years active: 2008–present
- Family: Nadya Hazboun (sister)

Samar Hazboun (Arabic: سمر حزبون; born 1985) is a Palestinian photographer and photojournalist from Bethlehem.

== Early life and education ==
Hazboun was born in Jerusalem and grew up in Bethlehem. Her sisters include Nadya, a jewellery and fashion designer, and Christina, who writes and works in music. During her childhood, Hazboun's father was detained by the IDF for two years.

At age 16, Hazboun left Palestine to study abroad. She graduated with a Bachelor of Arts (BA) in International Relations from Metropolitan University Prague and a Master of Arts (MA) in Photojournalism from the University of Westminster.

== Career ==
In 2008, Hazboun debuted her Obsessive Fantasy exhibition in Amman.

Hazboun started working on her project Hush in 2010, for which she gathered true stories from Palestinian women at a domestic/gender-based violence shelter, hoping to "end the silence". After completing her MA in London in 2011, Hazboun started exhibiting the project, which included a short documentary. She also published it on the platform Firecracker. Hush came second in the I Have Something to Say competition.

This was followed by Hazboun's 2012 photo essay Detained: Confessions of Palestinian children detained by Israel. It became the seventh most read article of 2013 in +972 Magazine.

With support from the Arab Fund for Arts and Culture (AFAC) and the Magnum Foundation under the Arab Documentary Photography Program (ADPP), Hazboun started research for her photography series Beyond Checkpoints in January 2024. The series photographs consist of objects invoking 18 stories from Palestinian women who were forced to give birth at checkpoints in the early 2000s. As part of the ADPP, Hazboun was one of four photographers featured in the 2015 Memory for Forgetfulness exhibition at the Athr Gallery in Jeddah alongside Natalie Naccache, Omar Imam and Reem Falaknaz. The exhibition showcased 11 of Hazboun's pieces.

Over the course of four years, Hazboun worked for Agence France-Presse as a Middle East editor. She shared her documentary photography with publications such as The New York Times and The Intercept. A project of hers titled Past Preserved covered Syrian refugees. Hazboun's Self-Portrait won the 2018 Pollux Award at the Worldwide Photography Gala Awards. She was selected for the 2018 Joop Swart Masterclass. Her photo essay Defining 'Christian' in Palestine for ONE Magazine came in Third Place at the 2019 Catholic Press Association Awards.

In light of the COVID-19 lockdown, Hazboun created the photography series Errant Doves, inspired by the Ocean Vuong poem of the same title, which sought to depict the Palestinian LGBT+ community. For ActionAid UK, Hazboun photographed women business owners in the West Bank. In 2022, Hazboun started the project Ahel El-Ard (People of the land), capturing the relationship between Palestinian people and their land. The project would be presented at the 2024 Image Festival Amman and the 2025 Chennai Photo Biennale. Also in 2022, Hazboun was one of 15 featured in the exhibition More Than Your Eyes Can See: Contemporary Photography from the Arab World at the Middle East Institute.

Since 2023, Hazboun has documented life in the West Bank, particularly Gazan Palestinians seeking medical treatment in West Bank. She spoke of how travel between for assignments has become more difficult and restricted. Hazboun's work was exhibited at the University of Greenwich in May 2024. Later that year, she took part in the Bard College exhibition To Be – Named: Palestine with her photography series Family Archive Project, which deals with her father's detention by the IDF and "the profound impact it had on my childhood and family". Along with other contributors, her credited contributions to ONE Magazine earned First and Third Place Catholic Media Awards.
