= Luis Santana (sport shooter) =

Dominican sports shooter

Personal information
- Born: 15 January 1937 (age 89) Hato Mayor del Rey, Dominican Republic

Sport
- Sport: Sports shooting

Luis Santana (born 15 January 1937) is a Dominican former sports shooter. He competed in the skeet event at the 1968 Summer Olympics.
