= George Hazboun =

Jordanian acadmeic

George Hazboun (born 1951 in Amman, Jordan), has served several posts; as the Dean of the faculty of law at the University of Jordan, Professor Hazboun served as a visiting professor at the school of Law in Damascus and in Houston Texas during the Sabbaticals. He served as a member of the ICC National Committee in Jordan as the President of the American University of Madaba. George served as a member of the Board of the Jordan institute of Judiciary and also served a member of the Higher Education Commission in Jordan.

George founded the law firm Hazboun & Co. in 1979. later the ICLC, specialized in legal issues related to Business law, Banking, Construct Contracts (FIDIC), Energy, Maritime and Shipping, Corporate, Aviation, ADR and Arbitration. George is member of various international professional institution including; the American Arbitration Association (Arbitration Panel), the Canadian Arbitration Center, the ICC Commission on Arbitration and ADR, he is also enlisted as a member of the Jordan Bar Association. George as a sole arbitration, Member and Chairman of (Arbitration Panels) in many international and Domestic arbitration cases.

George also served as attorney before international and domestic arbitration Panels and courts and published various legal articles in several reputable journals and periodic on arbitration multinational and energy topics. He contributed in drafting many Laws and Statutes in Jordan, the GCC Countries and the World Bank.
