= Andrés Amador =

Salvadoran sports shooter (1924–2013)

Personal information
- Full name: Andrés Amador Velásco
- Born: 22 November 1924 Sonsonate, El Salvador
- Died: 12 September 2013 (aged 88) San Salvador, El Salvador

Sport
- Sport: Sports shooting

Andrés Amador Velásco (22 November 1924 – 12 September 2013) was a Salvadoran sports shooter. Born in Sonsonate, he was selected to compete for El Salvador at the 1968 Summer Olympics. There, he placed 43rd overall in the mixed skeet event. He was also selected to compete for the nation at the 1972 Summer Olympics, There, he placed 47th overall in the mixed skeet event.

== Biography ==
Andrés Amador Velásco was born on 22 November 1924 in Sonsonate, El Salvador. As a sports shooter, he represented El Salvador in international competition.

Amador was selected to compete for El Salvador at the 1968 Summer Olympics in Mexico City, Mexico, for the nation's first appearance at an Olympic Games at a sporting capacity. At the 1968 Summer Games, he was entered to compete in the mixed skeet event held at the Vicente Suárez Shooting Range. He competed in the first eight rounds of the event from 21 to 22 October 1968, garnering 175 points out of a possible 200. Overall, he placed 43rd out of the 52 sports shooters that competed. Amador was also selected to compete for El Salvador at the 1972 Summer Olympics held in Munich, Germany.At the 1972 Summer Games, he was again entered to compete in the mixed skeet event held at the Olympia-Schießanlage. He competed in the first eight rounds of the event from 31 August to 2 September 1972, garnering 180 out of a possible 200, Overall, he placed 47th out of the 63 sports shooters that competed.

Amador later died on 12 September 2013 in San Salvador, El Salvador, at the age of 88.
