= Roberto Castellanos =

Salvadoran racewalker (1950–1980)

Personal information
- Full name: Roberto Castellanos Braña
- Nationality: Salvadoran
- Born: 7 October 1950 San Salvador, El Salvador
- Died: February or March 1980 (aged 29)

Sport
- Sport: Athletics
- Event: Racewalking

Roberto Castellanos Braña (7 October 1950 – February or March 1980) was a Salvadoran racewalker, professor, and labor leader. Born in San Salvador to activist parents, he initially had a sporting career and competed at the 1968 Summer Olympics. He later moved to Costa Rica and studied at the University of Costa Rica, later becoming a professor. With his wife, he moved back to El Salvador in 1979 and became the leader of the National Democratic Union. Though, both were later abducted by six policemen, with their bodies being found in an open grave a few days later.

== Biography ==
Roberto Castellanos Braña was born on 7 October 1950 in San Salvador, El Salvador, to Salvadoran father Raúl Castellanos Figueroa and Costa Rican mother Rosa Braña. His father was a journalist, politician, and the leader of the Communist Party of El Salvador while his mother led the Fraternidad de Mujeres Salvadoreñas in the 1950s and 1960s. Roberto Castellanos was an athlete, competing for El Salvador at the 1968 Summer Olympics in racewalking. He competed in the men's 20 kilometres walk and placed 29th out of the 34 athletes that were in the event.

Sometime after the 1968 Summer Games, he resided in Costa Rica and studied at the University of Costa Rica. After he graduated, he became a professor at the National University of Costa Rica. During a trip to the Soviet Union, he met Danish national Annette Mathiessen, who would soon be his wife. The two moved to El Salvador in 1979 during the Salvadoran Civil War and began their activism.

Castellanos became the leader of the National Democratic Union, often considered as a front for the Communist Party of El Salvador that had been outlawed. On 24 February 1980, at 5:00 p.m., Castellanos and Mathiessen were abducted by six members of the National Police of El Salvador, which was witnessed by multiple neighbors. The police had seized Castellanos on the street before raiding his house and arresting Mathiessen. By 2 March, they had disappeared. Then, on 8 March, both of their bodies were found in an open grave in a rural area. According to the Salvadoran Human Rights Commission, Castellanos had a fractured skull from a bullet shot through the forehead and repeated blows, while Mathiessen was shot in the forehead. Their bodies were taken to the University of El Salvador for a vigil.
