= Juan Antonio Valencia =

Salvadoran sports shooter (1929–2005)

Personal information
- Full name: Juan Antonio Valencia
- Born: 11 August 1929 San Salvador, El Salvador
- Died: 7 July 2005 (aged 75) San Salvador, El Salvador

Sport
- Sport: Sports shooting

Juan Antonio Valencia (11 August 1929 – 7 July 2005) was a Salvadoran former sports shooter. During his career, he competed at the 1968 Summer Olympics and the 1972 Summer Olympics for El Salvador, though did not medal in any of the events he entered.

== Biography ==
Juan Antonio Valencia was born on 11 August 1929 in San Salvador, El Salvador. As a sports shooter, he represented El Salvador in international competition.

Valencia was selected to compete for El Salvador at the 1968 Summer Olympics in Mexico City, Mexico, for the nation's first appearance at an Olympic Games at a sporting capacity. At the 1968 Summer Games, he was entered to compete in one event, the mixed 50 metre rifle three positions event. He competed in the event on 21 October 1968 against 61 other competitors. There, he garnered a total amount of 1,013 points out of a possible 1,200 and placed last.

He was also selected to compete for El Salvador at the 1972 Summer Olympics in Munich, Germany. At the 1972 Summer Games, he was entered to compete in two events, the mixed 50 metre rifle prone and mixed 50 metre rifle three positions events. He first competed in the mixed 50 metre rifle prone on 28 August 1972 against 100 other competitors. There, he garnered a total amount of 576 points out of a possible 600 and placed 91st. He then competed in the mixed 50 metre rifle three positions two days later against 68 other competitors. There, he garnered a total amount of 1,053 points out of a possible 1,200 and placed 62nd.

Valencia later died on 7 July 2005 in San Salvador at the age of 75.
