= Theo Bolkart =

German swimmer

Personal information
- Born: 4 April 1948 (age 78) Augsburg, Germany
- Height: 182 cm (5 ft 11 1/2 in)
- Weight: 82 kg (181 lb)

Sport
- Sport: Swimming

Theo Bolkart (born 4 April 1948) is a German former swimmer. He competed in the men's 200 metre breaststroke at the 1968 Summer Olympics.
