= Ricardo Menéndez (sportsman) =

Salvadoran sports shooter

Personal information
- Full name: Ricardo Alfonso Menéndez
- Born: 4 September 1929 San Salvador, El Salvador

Sport
- Sport: Sports shooting
Medal record
Men's shooting
Representing El Salvador
Central American and Caribbean Games
| Silver medal – second place | 1962 Kingston | 50 m small-bore rifle prone English match |

Ricardo Alfonso Menéndez (born 4 September 1929, date of death unknown) was a Salvadoran sports shooter. During his career, he competed at the 1962 Central American and Caribbean Games and won a silver medal in the 50 metre small-bore rifle prone English match event. He also competed for El Salvador at the 1968 Summer Olympics in the 50 metre rifle, prone event, and placed 81st out of 85 competitors.

== Biography ==
Ricardo Alfonso Menéndez was born on 4 September 1929 in San Salvador, El Salvador. As a sports shooter, he represented El Salvador in international competition. Representing El Salvador, he competed at the 1962 Central American and Caribbean Games held in Kingston, Jamaica. There, he won a silver medal in the 50 metre small-bore rifle, prone English match event.

Menéndez was selected to compete for El Salvador at the 1968 Summer Olympics in Mexico City, Mexico, for the nation's first appearance at an Olympic Games at a sporting capacity. At the 1968 Summer Games, he was entered to compete in one event, mixed 50 metre rifle, prone event. At the time, he had a height of 170 centimetres (5.6 ft) and a weight of 76 kilograms (168 lb). The shooting events were held at the Vicente Suárez Shooting Range. Menéndez competed in the mixed 50 metre rifle, prone event, on 19 October 1968 against 85 other sports shooters, including his teammate Tomás Vilanova. There, Menéndez recorded a total amount of 578 points out of a possible 600 points and placed 81st overall.

Menéndez later died on an unknown date.
