= Ibrahim Hazboun =

Palestinian astrologer

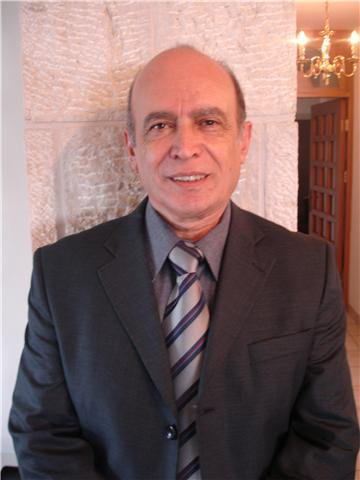
Ibrahim Hazboun

Ibrahim Yousef Ibrahim Hazboun (b. October 18, 1947) is a Palestinian astrologer who was born in Bethlehem city in the West Bank. He is a well-known figure in the Middle East.

== Career ==
He started his career as an announcer with the Israel Broadcasting Authority in 1970. He studied astrology as a hobby till he became a professional and started a live program on Israel Radio.

His first program in October 1993 got 7 calls. The last one before he left for early pension in December 2005 got around 30,000 calls from all over the world. Although he retired, Israel Radio insisted on bringing him back to his listeners due to high public demand. The program currently airs every weekend and has the highest ratings and is one of the longest running shows in the station's history.

Hazboun also has a daily horoscope segment on Radio Monte Carlo Doualiya, broadcast twice a day. He has a weekly column about astrology in Panorama newspaper, one of the leading newspapers for Arabs in Israel, and a daily horoscope forecast on the newspaper's website.

== Achievements ==
Hazboun has received many awards. He was also chosen as "Man of the Year" in the Telecommunications field in Haifa, Israel in 1995. In 1996 he published a book in Arabic explaining the basics of astrology; the book was a big success and was even pirated and translated into other languages such as the Kurdish language in Sulaymaniyah, Iraq.
