= José Astacio =

Salvadoran sprinter

Personal information
- Full name: José Nicolás Astacio
- Born: 17 May 1947 (age 79) San Salvador, El Salvador

Sport
- Sport: Sprinting
- Event: 200 metres

José Nicolás Astacio (born 17 May 1947) is a Salvadoran sprinter. During his career, he was selected to compete for El Salvador at the 1968 Summer Olympics. He competed in the men's 200 metres and men's 400 metres, though did not advance further from the preliminary heats and medal in either event.

== Biography ==
José Nicolás Astacio was born on 17 May 1947 in San Salvador, El Salvador.

As a sprinter, Astacio was selected to compete for El Salvador at the 1968 Summer Olympics in Mexico City, Mexico, for El Salvador's first appearance at an Olympic Games in a sporting context. For his participation, he was entered in the men's 200 metres and men's 400 metres.

Astacio first competed in the preliminary heats of the men's 200 metres on 15 October. He raced in the sixth heat against six other athletes, namely: Roger Bambuck, Juan "Papo" Franceschi, Rajalingam Gunaratnam, Peter Norman, Dick Steane, and Alberto Torres. There, Astacio recorded a time of 23.13 seconds and placed sixth, failing to advance to the semifinals as only the top four of his heat would be able to advance.

He then competed in the preliminary heats of the men's 400 metres held the following day on 16 October. He raced in the fourth heat against six other athletes, namely: Howard Davies, Pedro Grajales, Martin Jellinghaus, Ross MacKenzie, Jacques Pennewaert, and Michael Zerbes. There, he recorded a time of 52.92 seconds and placed last in the heat, again failing to advance to the quarterfinals as only the top four of his heat would be able to advance.
