= Javier Jiménez (swimmer) =

Mexican swimmer

Personal information
- Born: 10 March 1948 (age 78) Mexico City, Mexico

Sport
- Sport: Swimming

Javier Jiménez (born 10 March 1948) is a Mexican former swimmer. He competed in the men's 100 metre breaststroke at the 1968 Summer Olympics.
