= Olive wood carving in Palestine =

Traditional chiseled sculpture technique

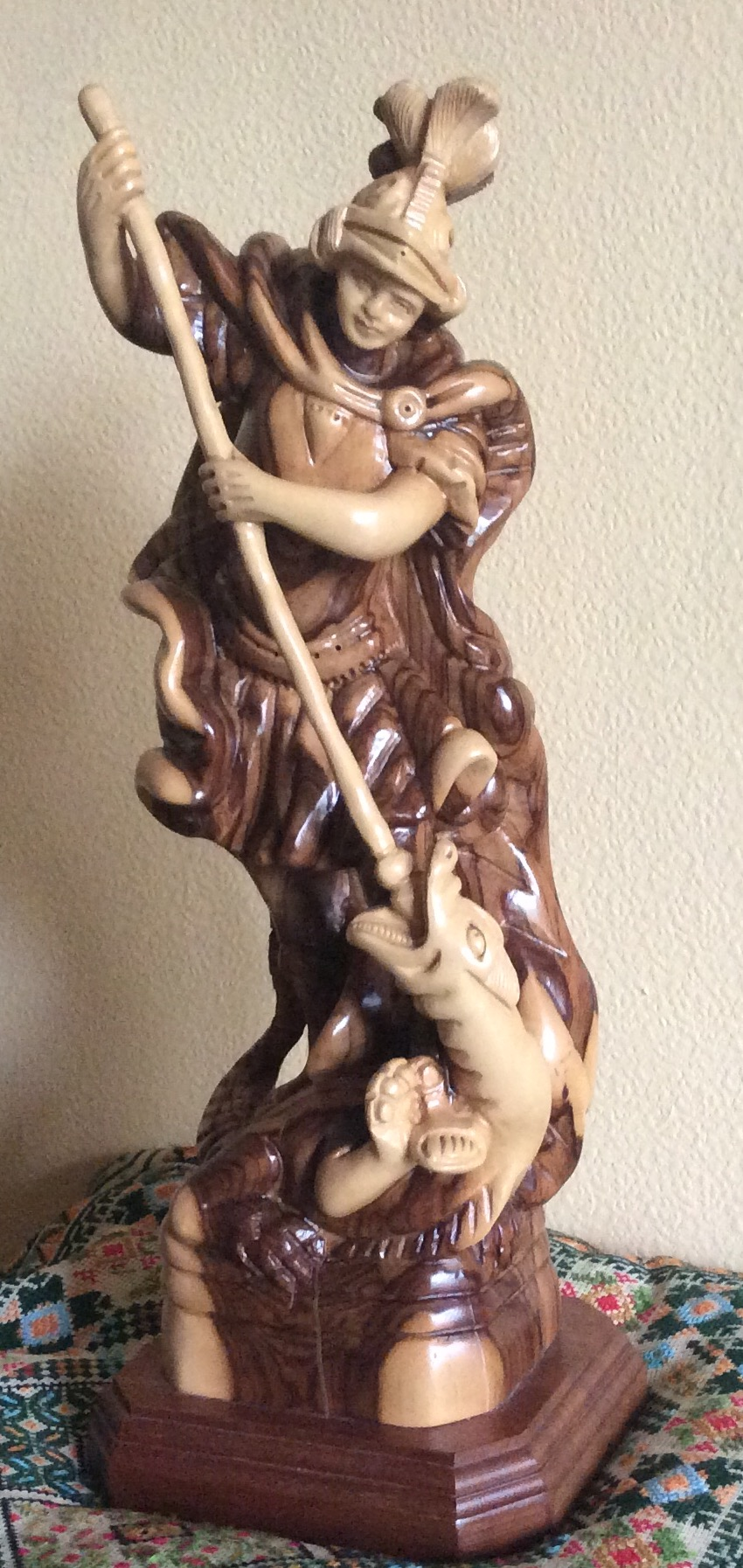
St George. Olive wood 35cm. Beit Sahour 2012

Olive wood carving is an ancient tradition in Palestine that continues to the present day. It involves the precise chiseling of olive wood and is most common in the Bethlehem region.

== History ==
The tradition of making the handicrafts began in the 4th century CE under Byzantine rule in Bethlehem — which continues to be the main city that produces the craft — following the construction of the Church of the Nativity. Greek Orthodox monks taught local residents how to carve olive wood. The art developed and became a major industry in Bethlehem and nearby towns like Beit Sahour and Beit Jala in the 16th and 17th centuries when Italian and Franciscan artisans on pilgrimage to the area — by now under the rule of the Ottomans — taught the residents how to carve. Since then the tradition has been passed on generation by generation and is dominated by the descendants of the original local carvers.

Today, the art continues to be a major source of income for Bethlehem's Palestinian Christian residents and is the most profitable tourist product in the city with the main purchasers being Christian pilgrims visiting in Christmas time. Olive wood is carved into crosses, boxes, picture frames, covers for historical and old books, candle holders, rosaries, urns, vases and Christmas ornaments as well as scenes of the Holy Family. Olive wood branches are supplied by olive groves in nearby villages as well as from the Nablus and Tulkarm region, despite the difficulty of transportation in the West Bank.

== Production process ==
The process of producing an olive wood craft requires labor intensity and consists of many stages, often involving the work of multiple artisans. Drilling machines are used initially to attain the rough outline of the intended craft. It accounts for 15% of the process, although it eliminates some of the most difficult and time-consuming aspects of the carving. Next the piece is passed onto a skilled artisan who transforms the rough outline into a finished product by chiseling the details. Finally, the finished item must be sanded down and polished, then coated with olive wax to give the object a "natural shine" and ensure its longevity. Depending on what the particular product is, the process could take up to 45 days. Most professional artisans go through six to seven years of training.

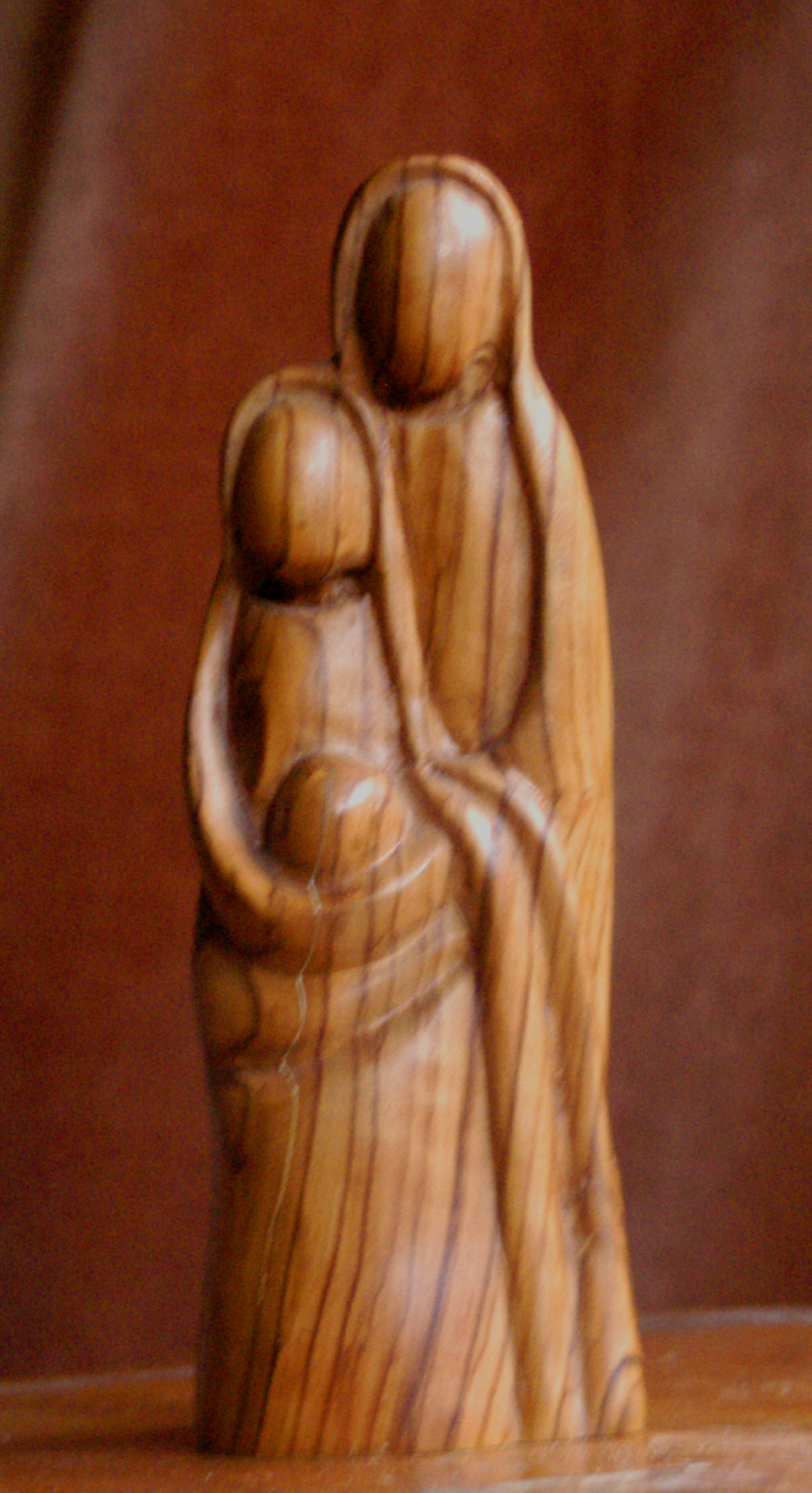
The Holy Family in olive wood. Beit Sahour, 2000

Olive wood is used because it is easier to carve than other woods and could be done accurately with simple hand tools. Also, it has a diverse variety of natural color and tonal depth, due to the annual structure. It is also resistant to decay and receptive to a number of surfacing treatments.

== See also ==
- Mother-of-Pearl carving in Bethlehem
- Palestinian handicrafts
