= Gregor Betz =

German swimmer

Personal information
- Born: 11 February 1948 (age 78) Oberammergau, Germany

Sport
- Sport: Swimming

Gregor Betz (born 11 February 1948) is a German former swimmer. He competed at the 1968 Summer Olympics and the 1972 Summer Olympics.
