= Felipe Muñoz =

Mexican swimmer (born 1951)

Personal information
- Full name: Felipe Muñoz Kapamas
- Nickname: Tibio
- Born: February 3, 1951 (age 75) Mexico City, Mexico
- Height: 1.81 m (5 ft 11 in)
- Weight: 74 kg (163 lb)

Sport
- Sport: Swimming
- Strokes: Breaststroke
Medal record
Representing Mexico
Olympic Games
Gold medal – first place	1968 Mexico City	200 m breaststroke
Pan American Games
Silver medal – second place	1971 Cali	200 m breaststroke
Bronze medal – third place	1971 Cali	200 m medley
Summer Universiade
Bronze medal – third place	1973 Moscow	200 m breaststroke

Felipe Muñoz Kapamas (born February 3, 1951) is a Mexican former breaststroke swimmer. He competed at the 1968 and 1972 Summer Olympics and won a gold medal in the 200 m event in 1968. Since 2008, he is the President of the Mexican Olympic Committee. He served as Deputy of the LV and LXII Legislature of the Mexican Congress.

Muñoz is of Greek descent on his mother's side.

His nickname is "el tibio", which means "lukewarm" in Spanish, a nickname which has multiple possible explanations. According to some sources, it was coined because he had the habit of refusing to swim in an unheated pool. However, other sources, including the International Swimming Hall of Fame, have stated that it was because his mother was from the town of Río Frío (meaning Cold River) and his father was from the town of Aguascalientes (meaning Hot Waters).

== See also ==
- List of members of the International Swimming Hall of Fame
