= Cecilia Sosa =

Salvadoran sprinter (born 1948)

Personal information
- Full name: Cecilia Nohemí Sosa Vargas
- Born: 7 February 1948 (age 78) San Salvador, El Salvador

Sport
- Sport: Sprinting
- Event: 100 metres

Cecilia Nohemí Sosa Vargas (born 7 February 1948) is a Salvadoran sprinter, hurdler, and long jumper. From the 1960s to the 1970s, Sosa was active in sport. For the 1968 Summer Olympics, she competed for El Salvador as the first female to compete for the nation at an Olympic Games. She entered in three events but did not medal in either of them.

== Biography ==
Cecilia Nohemí Sosa Vargas was born on 7 February 1948 in San Salvador, El Salvador. From the 1960s to the 1970s, Sosa was active in international and national athletics. She was selected to compete for El Salvador at the 1968 Summer Olympics in Mexico City, Mexico, for the nation's first appearance at an Olympic Games. There, she became the first female competitor to compete for El Salvador at an Olympic Games.

Sosa first competed in the qualifying round of the women's long jump on 13 October in Group B against 12 other competitors. There, she failed to record a mark and did not qualify for the finals. The following day, she competed in the qualifying heats of the women's 100 metres in the sixth heat against six other competitors. There, she recorded a time of 13.76 seconds and placed last in her heat, failing to advance further into the quarterfinals. Her last event was the women's 80 metres hurdles. She competed in the qualifying heats of the event on 17 October in the fifth heat against five other competitors. There, she recorded a time of 12.90 seconds and placed last, failing to advance further into the semifinals. Although she did not advance further into the semifinals, she set a new personal best time in the event. In 1970, she recorded a personal best mark in the long jump with 4.42 metres.
