= José Mario Váldez =

Salvadoran sports shooter

Personal information
- Born: 19 March 1931

Sport
- Sport: Sports shooting

José Mario Váldez (born 19 March 1931) is a Salvadoran former sports shooter. He competed in the 50 metre rifle, prone event at the 1972 Summer Olympics.
