= Roberto Soundy =

Salvadoran sports shooter (1900–1990)

Personal information
- Born: 4 March 1900 San Salvador, El Salvador

Sport
- Sport: Sports shooting

Roberto Soundy (4 March 1900 – 5 October 1990) was a Salvadoran sports shooter. He competed in the trap event at the 1968 Summer Olympics.
