= María Moreño =

Salvadoran swimmer (born 1952)

Personal information
- Born: 2 December 1952 (age 73) San Salvador, El Salvador

Sport
- Sport: Swimming

María Moreño (born 4 December 1952) is a Salvadoran former swimmer. She competed in five events at the 1968 Summer Olympics.
