= Friedrich Jokisch =

Salvadoran swimmer (born 1952)

Personal information
- Full name: Friedrich W. Jokisch Argüello
- Nationality: Salvadoran
- Born: 17 November 1952 San Salvador, El Salvador
- Died: Unknown
- Height: 167 cm (5 ft 6 in)
- Weight: 67 kg (148 lb)

Sport
- Sport: Swimming
- Strokes: 400 metres Freestyle, Men (Olympic) 100 metres Backstroke, Men (Olympic) 100 metres Butterfly, Men (Olympic) 200 metres Individual Medley, Men (Olympic)

Friedrich Jokisch (born 17 November 1952, date of death unknown) was a Salvadoran swimmer. He competed in four events at the 1968 Summer Olympics.
