= Alberto Forelli =

Argentine swimmer (1946–2025)

Personal information
- Born: 17 July 1946 Córdoba, Argentina
- Died: 27 January 2025 (aged 78)

Sport
- Sport: Swimming

Alberto Forelli (17 July 1946 – 27 January 2025) was an Argentine swimmer. He competed in three events at the 1968 Summer Olympics.
