= Eduardo Moreno (swimmer) =

Mexican swimmer

Personal information
- Born: 28 June 1944 (age 82) Mexico City, Mexico

Sport
- Sport: Swimming

Eduardo Moreno (born 28 June 1944) is a Mexican former swimmer. He competed in two events at the 1968 Summer Olympics.
