= Alex Martínez (weightlifter) =

Salvadoran weightlifter

Personal information
- Born: 9 March 1939 (age 86); La Paz, El Salvador

Sport
- Sport: Weightlifting

Alex Martínez (born 9 March 1939) is a Salvadoran weightlifter. He competed in the men's bantamweight event at the 1968 Summer Olympics.
