= Stuart Roberts (swimmer) =

British swimmer

Personal information
- Born: 22 October 1951 (age 74) Eccles, England

Sport
- Sport: Swimming

John Stuart Roberts (born 22 October 1951) is a male British former swimmer.

== Swimming career ==
Roberts competed in two events at the 1968 Summer Olympics. At the ASA National British Championships he won the 110 yards breaststroke title and the 220 yards breaststroke title in 1968.
