= Valerio Fontanals =

Salvadoran weightlifter

Personal information
- Born: 21 August 1948 (age 77) San Salvador, El Salvador

Sport
- Sport: Weightlifting

Valerio Fontanals (born 21 August 1948) is a Salvadoran weightlifter. He competed in the men's lightweight event at the 1968 Summer Olympics.
