= Roberto García (cyclist) =

Salvadoran cyclist

Personal information
- Full name: Roberto Antonio García
- Born: 8 September 1937 (age 89) San Salvador, El Salvador
- Height: 5 ft 4 in (163 cm)
- Weight: 58 kg (128 lb)

Cycling career
- Sport: Cycling
- Current team: El Salvador (Former)

Roberto García (born 8 September 1937) is a former Salvadoran cyclist. He competed in the team time trial at the 1968 Summer Olympics in Mexico City.
