= Tomás Vilanova =

Salvadoran sports shooter (1925–2007)

Personal information
- Born: 18 January 1925 Santa Ana, El Salvador
- Died: July 2007 (aged 82) San Salvador, El Salvador

Sport
- Sport: Sports shooting
Medal record
Men's shooting
Representing El Salvador
Central American and Caribbean Games
Gold medal – first place	1950 Guatemala City	Pan American Shooting, rapid
Silver medal – second place	1950 Guatemala City	National match

Samuel Tomás Vilanova Mayorga (18 January 1925 – July 2007) was a Salvadoran sports shooter. During his career, he competed at the 1950 Central American and Caribbean Games and won a gold and silver medal. He also competed in the mixed 50 metre rifle prone and mixed 25 metre rapid fire pistol at the 1968 Summer Olympics.

== Biography ==
Samuel Tomás Vilanova Mayorga was born on 18 January 1925 in Santa Ana, El Salvador. As a sports shooter, he represented El Salvador in international competition. Representing El Salvador, he competed at the 1950 Central American and Caribbean Games held in Guatemala City, Guatemala. There, he won the gold medal in the Pan American Shooting (rapid) event and placed second in the national match.

Vilanova was selected to compete for El Salvador at the 1968 Summer Olympics in Mexico City, Mexico, for the nation's first appearance at an Olympic Games at a sporting capacity. At the 1968 Summer Games, he was entered to compete in two events, the mixed 50 metre rifle prone and mixed 25 metre rapid fire pistol. He first competed in the mixed 50 metre rifle prone event on 19 October 1968 against 85 other competitors. There, he garnered a total amount of 581 points out of a possible 600 and placed 74th overall. He then competed in the mixed 25 metre rapid fire pistol, which was held from 22 to 23 October 1968, against 55 other competitors. There, he garnered a total a total amount of 561 out of a possible 600 and placed 49th overall.

Vilanova later died in June 2007 in San Salvador, El Salvador, at the age of 82.
