= Michael Günther =

German swimmer

Personal information
- Born: 27 April 1950 (age 76) Grünheide, East Germany

Sport
- Sport: Swimming

Michael Günther (born 27 April 1950) is a German former swimmer. He competed at the 1968 Summer Olympics and the 1972 Summer Olympics.
