= Carmen Ferracuti =

Salvadoran swimmer (born 1952)

Personal information
- Born: 29 June 1952 (age 74) San Salvador, El Salvador

Sport
- Sport: Swimming

Carmen Ferracuti (born 29 June 1952) is a Salvadoran former swimmer. She competed in six events at the 1968 Summer Olympics.
