= Edgar Morales (footballer) =

Salvadoran footballer (1940–2021)

Personal information
- Date of birth: 17 April 1940
- Date of death: 1 October 2021 (aged 81)
- Position: Defender

Senior career*
Years	Team	Apps	(Gls)
- Alianza

International career
- El Salvador
- * Club domestic league appearances and goals

Edgar Morales (17 April 1940 – 1 October 2021) was a Salvadoran footballer. He competed in the men's tournament at the 1968 Summer Olympics.
