= Osvaldo Boretto =

Argentine swimmer

Personal information
- Born: 10 August 1952 (age 73) Córdoba, Argentina

Sport
- Sport: Swimming

Osvaldo Boretto (born 10 August 1952) is an Argentine former swimmer. He competed at the 1968 Summer Olympics and the 1972 Summer Olympics.
