= Ricardo Cruz (athlete) =

Salvadoran racewalker

Personal information
- Nationality: Salvadoran
- Born: 9 April 1946 (age 80)

Sport
- Sport: Athletics
- Event: Racewalking

Ricardo Cruz (born 9 April 1946) is a Salvadoran racewalker. He competed in the men's 50 kilometres walk at the 1968 Summer Olympics.
