= Donatella Ferracuti =

Salvadoran swimmer (born 1953)

Personal information
- Born: 5 September 1953 (age 72) San Salvador, El Salvador

Sport
- Sport: Swimming

Donatella Ferracuti (born 5 September 1953) is a Salvadoran former swimmer. She competed in four events at the 1968 Summer Olympics.
