= José Ruano =

Salvadoran footballer (born 1945)

Personal information
- Date of birth: 30 September 1945 (age 81)
- Place of birth: Santa Ana, El Salvador
- Position: Defender

International career
Years	Team	Apps	(Gls)
- El Salvador

José Ruano (born 30 September 1945) is a Salvadoran former footballer. He competed in the men's tournament at the 1968 Summer Olympics.
