= Ricardo Soundy =

Salvadoran sports shooter

Personal information
- Born: 3 January 1948 (age 78) San Salvador, El Salvador

Sport
- Sport: Sports shooting

Ricardo Soundy (born 3 January 1948) is a Salvadoran former sports shooter. He competed in the skeet event at the 1968 Summer Olympics.
