= Egon Henninger =

German swimmer (1940–2025)

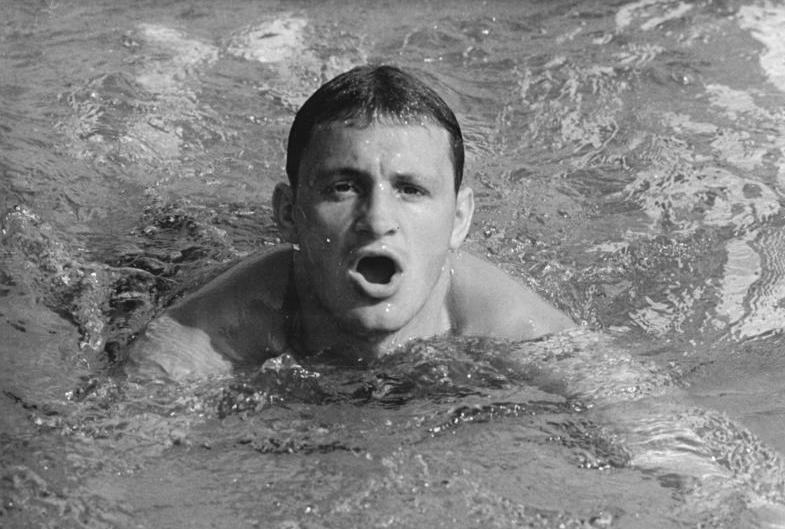
- Henninger in 1967

Personal information
- Born: 22 June 1940 Kühlungsborn, Gau Mecklenburg, Germany
- Died: 10 August 2025 (aged 85)
- Height: 1.74 m (5 ft 9 in)
- Weight: 76 kg (168 lb)

Sport
- Sport: Swimming
- Club: ASK Vorwärts Rostock
Medal record
Representing Germany
Olympic Games
Silver medal – second place	1964 Tokyo	4×100 m medley relay
Representing East Germany
Olympic Games
Silver medal – second place	1968 Mexico City	4×100 m medley relay
European Championships
Gold medal – first place	1962 Leipzig	4×100 m medley relay
Silver medal – second place	1966 Utrecht	4×100 m medley relay
Bronze medal – third place	1966 Utrecht	200 m breaststroke

Egon Henninger (22 June 1940 – 10 August 2025) was a German swimmer. He competed at the 1960, 1964 and 1968 Summer Olympics in the 200 m breaststroke and finished in fourth, fifth and sixth place, respectively. Henninger won silver medals in the 4 × 100 m medley relay in 1964 and 1968. He won three medals in these two swimming events at the European championships in 1962 and 1966. Henninger died on 10 August 2025, at the age of 85.
