= Helio Castro =

Salvadoran sports shooter (born 1917)

Personal information
- Full name: Helio Castro Clará
- Born: 27 October 1917 San Juan Nonualco, El Salvador

Sport
- Sport: Sports shooting

Helio Castro (born 27 October 1917, date of death unknown) was a Salvadoran sports shooter. He competed in two events at the 1968 Summer Olympics. Castro is deceased.
