= Alfredo Cubías =

Salvadoran middle-distance runner

Personal information
- Full name: Alfredo Ernesto Cubías Borges
- Nationality: Salvadoran
- Born: 27 November 1945 (age 80)

Sport
- Sport: Middle-distance running
- Event: 800 metres

Alfredo Ernesto Cubías Borges (born 27 November 1945) is a Salvadoran middle-distance runner. He competed in the men's 800 metres at the 1968 Summer Olympics.
