= Leiknir Jónsson =

Icelandic swimmer

Personal information
- Born: 22 October 1943 (age 82) Patreksfjörður, Iceland

Sport
- Sport: Swimming
- Strokes: breaststroke

Leiknir Jónsson (born 22 October 1943) is an Icelandic former breaststroke swimmer. He competed in two events at the 1968 Summer Olympics.
