= Osamu Tsurumine =

Japanese swimmer (1941–2015)

Personal information
- Born: 21 August 1941 Kagoshima Prefecture, Japan
- Died: 2 February 2015 (aged 73) Toyota, Japan

Sport
- Sport: Swimming
Medal record
Representing Japan
Summer Universiade
Gold medal – first place	1965 Budapest	200m breaststroke
Silver medal – second place	1967 Tokyo	200m breaststroke
Bronze medal – third place	1967 Tokyo	100m breaststroke

Osamu Tsurumine (鶴峯 治, Tsurumine Osamu; 21 August 1941 – 2 February 2015) was a Japanese swimmer. He competed at the 1964 Summer Olympics and the 1968 Summer Olympics.
