= Ricardo Martínez (footballer, born 1947) =

Salvadoran footballer

Personal information
- Date of birth: 28 October 1947 (age 79)
- Place of birth: Sonsonate, El Salvador

Senior career*
Years	Team	Apps	(Gls)
1967	Atletico Marte		
1968	C.D. Aguila		
1970-1975	Alianza		

International career
- El Salvador
- * Club domestic league appearances and goals

Ricardo Martínez (born 28 October 1947) is a Salvadoran former footballer. He competed in the men's tournament at the 1968 Summer Olympics.
