= Slavko Kurbanović =

Serbian swimmer

Personal information
- Born: 3 September 1946 (age 79) Subotica, Yugoslavia

Sport
- Sport: Swimming

Slavko Kurbanović (born 3 September 1946) is a Serbian former swimmer. He competed in two events at the 1968 Summer Olympics for Yugoslavia.
