= Mauricio Bolaños =

Salvadoran cyclist

Personal information
- Born: 16 January 1939 (age 87) San Martin, San Salvador, El Salvador

Cycling career
- Sport: Cycling

Mauricio Bolaños (born 19 February 1939) is a former Salvadoran cyclist. He competed in the individual road race and the team time trial events at the 1968 Summer Olympics.
