= Thomas Aretz =

German swimmer (born 1948)

Personal information
- Born: 5 September 1948 (age 77) Obernburg, Germany

Sport
- Sport: Swimming

Thomas Aretz (born 5 September 1948) is a German former breaststroke and medley swimmer. He competed at the 1968 Summer Olympics and the 1972 Summer Olympics. He later earned a MD from Harvard Medical School.
