= Nicolas Gilliard =

Swiss swimmer

Personal information
- Born: 27 October 1947 (age 78) Davos, Switzerland

Sport
- Sport: Swimming

Nicolas Gilliard (born 27 October 1947) is a Swiss former breaststroke swimmer. He competed in three events at the 1968 Summer Olympics.
