= Ignacio Hasbún =

Chilean footballer (born 1990)

Personal information
- Full name: Ignacio Javier Hasbún Delgado
- Date of birth: 2 January 1990 (age 36)
- Place of birth: Santiago, Chile
- Height: 1.80 m (5 ft 11 in)
- Position: Goalkeeper

Youth career
- Universidad Católica

Senior career*
Years	Team	Apps	(Gls)
2008–2010	Universidad Católica	1	(0)
2010	Deportes Copiapó	6	(0)
2010–2015	Magallanes	28	(0)
Total		35	(0)

International career
2007	Chile U17	4	(0)
- * Club domestic league appearances and goals

Ignacio Javier Hasbún Delgado (born 2 January 1990) is a Chilean former footballer who played as a goalkeeper.

His last club was Magallanes, where he played from 2010 to 2015.

== Honours ==
Magallanes

- Tercera A de Chile (1): 2010
