= Manuel Escobar =

Salvadoran sailor

Personal information
- Born: 6 August 1924 San Salvador, El Salvador
- Died: 8 March 1995 (aged 70)

Sport
- Sport: Sailing

Manuel Escobar Palomo (6 August 1924 – 8 March 1995) was a Salvadoran sailor. He competed in the Flying Dutchman event at the 1968 Summer Olympics.
