= Francisco Funes =

Salvadoran cyclist

Personal information
- Born: 28 March 1950 (age 76) San Juan Nonualco, El Salvador

Cycling career
- Sport: Cycling

Francisco Funes (born 25 March 1950) is a former Salvadoran cyclist. He competed in the individual road race and the team time trial events at the 1968 Summer Olympics.
