= Yevhen Mykhailov =

Russian swimmer

Personal information
- Nationality: Russian
- Born: 24 January 1947 (age 79) Moscow, Soviet Union

Sport
- Sport: Swimming

Yevhen Mykhailov (born 24 January 1947) is a Russian former swimmer. He competed in two events at the 1968 Summer Olympics for the Soviet Union.
