= Ladislau Koszta =

Romanian swimmer

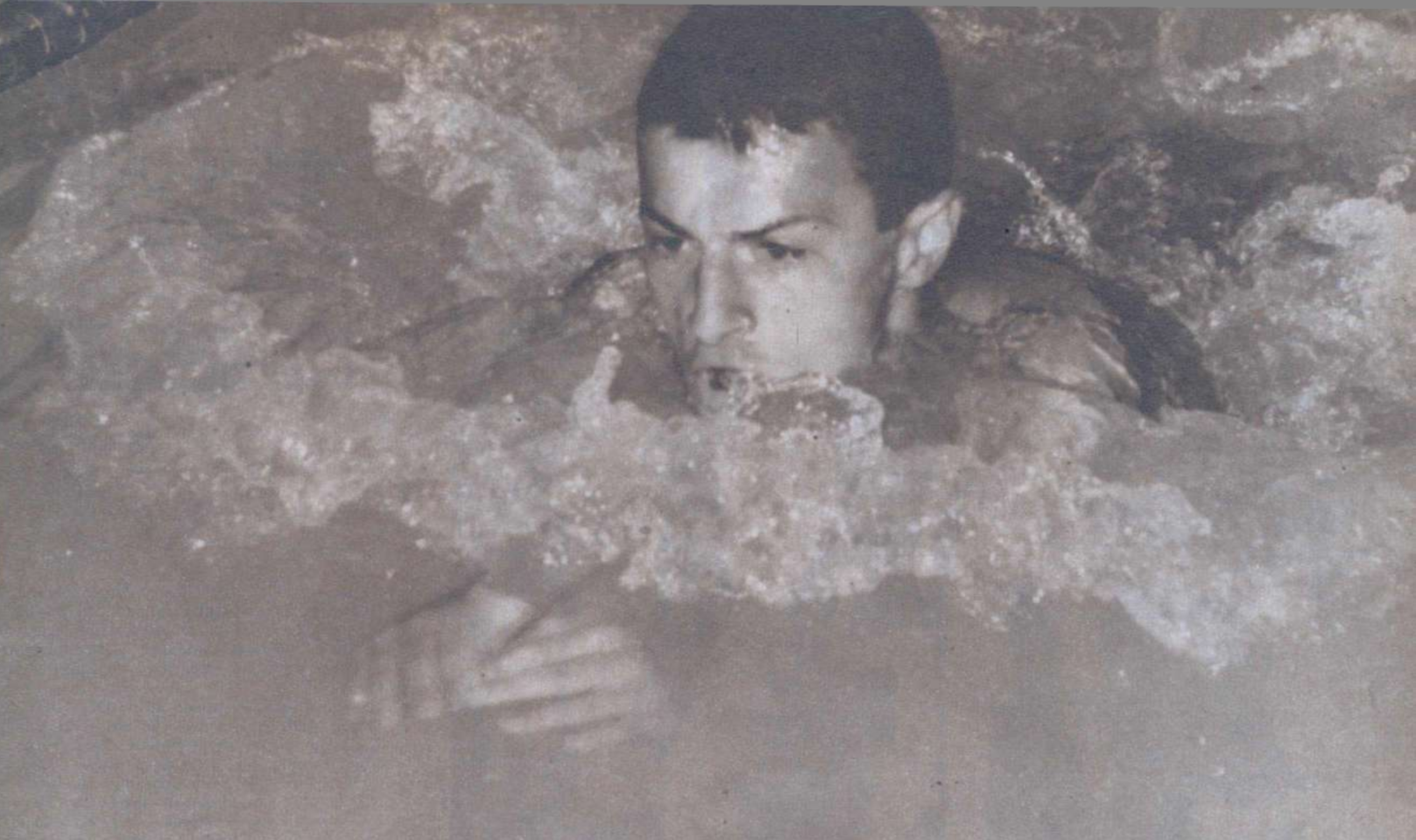

Personal information
- Born: 2 October 1947 (age 78) Timișoara, Romania

Sport
- Sport: Swimming

Ladislau Koszta (born 2 October 1947) is a Romanian former breaststroke swimmer. He competed in two events at the 1968 Summer Olympics.
