= Antonio Ferracuti =

Salvadoran swimmer (born 1954)

Personal information
- Full name: Antonio Ferracuti
- Born: 29 November 1954 (age 71)

Sport
- Sport: Swimming

Antonio Ferracuti (born 29 November 1954) is a Salvadoran former swimmer. He competed in two events at the 1972 Summer Olympics.
