= Juan Molina (cyclist) =

Salvadoran cyclist

Personal information
- Born: 14 June 1948 (age 78) San Salvador, El Salvador

Cycling career
- Sport: Cycling

Juan Molina (born 14 June 1948) is a former Salvadoran cyclist. He competed in the individual road race and the team time trial events at the 1968 Summer Olympics.
