= Arturo Carranza =

Salvadoran swimmer (born 1953)

Personal information
- Born: 17 September 1953 San Salvador, El Salvador

Sport
- Sport: Swimming

Arturo Carranza (born 17 September 1953, date of death unknown) was a Salvadoran swimmer. He competed in three events at the 1968 Summer Olympics. Afterwards, he did not participate in any Olympics.
