= Eduardo Ramos (swimmer) =

Salvadoran swimmer (born 1953)

Personal information
- Born: 11 June 1953 (age 73) San Salvador, El Salvador

Sport
- Sport: Swimming

Eduardo Ramos (born 11 June 1953) is a Salvadoran former swimmer. He competed in the men's 100 metre breaststroke at the 1968 Summer Olympics.
