= Józef Klukowski (swimmer) =

Polish swimmer (born 1846)

Personal information
- Born: 5 February 1946 (age 80) Gdańsk, Poland

Sport
- Sport: Swimming

Józef Klukowski (born 5 February 1946) is a Polish former breaststroke swimmer. He competed in two events at the 1968 Summer Olympics.
