= Roger Roberts (swimmer) =

British swimmer

Personal information
- Born: 2 October 1948 (age 77) London, England

Sport
- Sport: Swimming
- Club: Stoke Newington Swimming Club

Roger P Roberts (born 2 October 1948) is a male British former swimmer. Roberts competed in three events at the 1968 Summer Olympics. At the ASA National British Championships he won the 110 yards breaststroke title in 1966 and 1967 and the 220 yards breaststroke title in 1967.
