= Rubén Guerrero =

Salvadoran swimmer (born 1954)

Personal information
- Born: 1 November 1954 (age 71) San Salvador, El Salvador

Sport
- Sport: Swimming

Rubén Guerrero (born 1 November 1954) is a Salvadoran former swimmer. He competed in five events at the 1968 Summer Olympics.
