= José Alvarado (swimmer) =

Salvadoran swimmer (born 1953)

Personal information
- Born: 20 August 1953 (age 72) San Salvador, El Salvador

Sport
- Sport: Swimming

José Alvarado (born 20 August 1953) is a Salvadoran former swimmer. He competed in three events at the 1968 Summer Olympics.
