= Abel Muñoz =

Salvadoran swimmer (born 1951)

Personal information
- Born: 24 October 1951 (age 74) Usulután, El Salvador

Sport
- Sport: Swimming

Abel Muñoz (born 24 October 1951) is a Salvadoran former swimmer. He competed in two events at the 1968 Summer Olympics.
