= Rosa Hasbún =

Salvadoran swimmer (born 1952)

Personal information
- Born: 21 May 1952 (age 74) Cartago, Colombia

Sport
- Sport: Swimming

Rosa Hasbún (born 21 May 1952) is a Salvadoran former swimmer. Born in Colombia, she competed in five events at the 1968 Summer Olympics.
