= Salvador Vilanova =

Salvadoran swimmer (born 1952)

Personal information
- Born: 30 October 1952 (age 73) San Salvador, El Salvador

Sport
- Sport: Swimming

Salvador Vilanova (born 30 October 1952) is a Salvadoran former swimmer. He competed at the 1968 Summer Olympics and the 1972 Summer Olympics.
