= Sergio Hasbún =

Salvadoran swimmer (born 1947)

Personal information
- Born: 27 September 1947 (age 78)

Sport
- Sport: Swimming

Sergio Hasbún (born 27 September 1947) is a Salvadoran former swimmer. He competed in two events at the 1972 Summer Olympics.
